= Shadow Hearts (video game) =

2001 video game

- North America box art, featuring protagonists Yuri and Alice, and main antagonist Albert Simon.
- Developer: Sacnoth
- Publishers: JP: Aruze; WW: Midway Games
- Director: Matsuzo Machida
- Producer: Jun Mihara
- Designer: Izumi Hamamoto
- Artist: Miyako Kato
- Writer: Matsuzo Machida
- Composers: Yoshitaka Hirota; Masaharu Iwata; Yasunori Mitsuda
- Series: Shadow Hearts
- Platform: PlayStation 2
- Release: JP: June 28, 2001; NA: December 12, 2001; PAL: March 29, 2002
- Genre: Role-playing
- Mode: Single-player

Shadow Hearts (Note: Japanese: シャドウハーツ, Hepburn: Shadōhātsu) is a role-playing video game developed by Sacnoth for the PlayStation 2. Published in Japan by Aruze in 2001, it was published internationally by Midway Games in the same year (North America) and 2002 (Europe). The titular first game in the Shadow Hearts series, it acts as a sequel to the 1999 video game Koudelka, being set in the same world and featuring recurring characters.

The story of Shadow Hearts is set in 1913 and follows Yuri Hyuga, a human with the ability to capture and transform into monsters, as he protects Alice Elliot from the machinations of an evil magician. During gameplay, the player controls Yuri as he explores various locations. During battle, a party of up to three characters can be controlled, with actions in battle relying on a timing-based system dubbed the Judgement Ring. The game's worldview combines alternate history with elements of Lovecraftian horror.

Development began following the completion of Koudelka in 1999. Koudelka art director Matsuzo Machida acted as director and wrote the game's scenario, inspired by the works of H. P. Lovecraft and the manga Devilman by Go Nagai. The Judgement Ring drew inspiration from fighting game mechanics and Aruze's pachinko machines. Composer Yoshitaka Hirota combined multiple genres and described the score as "beautiful yet destructive". Upon release, the game met with low sales and a mixed critical reception. Journalists praised the story and Judgement Ring mechanic, but many found faults with the gameplay balance and criticised the graphics. A sequel, Shadow Hearts: Covenant, was released in 2004.

== Gameplay ==
A battle in Shadow Hearts: everything from basic attacks to special abilities, and some actions outside battle, rely on correct use of the Judgement Ring.

Shadow Hearts is a role-playing video game (RPG) where players take control of main protagonist Yuri Hyuga and a party of companions as they progress through a linear storyline. The players travel through a variety of pre-rendered environments, collecting and buying items and equipment, talking to non-playable characters who act as quests givers and merchants, and completing both story-centered quests and side quests.

The game's turn-based battles are triggered through random encounters and transport the party to a themed battle arena. The party can use standard attacks, magical abilities unique to each character, use items that have different effects (healing, curing status ailments), defend against attacks, or escape from battle. Each character has hit points (health), skill points (magic), and sanity points (SP). SP ordinarily decrease once per turn, and when a character runs out of SP they go berserk and cannot be controlled by the player. Successfully completing each battle rewards experience points which raise character attributes, money to purchase equipment and items, and Soul Energy used in Fusion.

Fusion is a skill unique to Yuri. When enough Soul Energy has been collected, Yuri can fight a monster type in the Graveyard, a metaphysical realm within his soul. By defeating a monster in the Graveyard, Yuri gains control over it, and is able to transform into it during battle. While in Fusion form, Yuri has access to the assigned monster's statistics and abilities. Performing a Fusion drains Yuri of some SP. As he gathers Soul Energy, Yuri also accumulates an energy called Malice, which will eventually summon a powerful enemy if it is not dispelled by battling an avatar of Malice in the Graveyard.

An integral part of gameplay is the Judgement Ring, which is used both in battle and during environmental quick-time events and shopping. Represented as a disc with colored areas on its surface, the player's aim is to hit those areas as a pointer passes over them. In battle, every attack and ability is tied to the Judgement Ring. If the player fails to hit an area, the attack can either be cut short or cancelled altogether. The final portion of each target area is red, and if the player hits it the attack or skill is boosted in power. Items, spells and equipment can modify the Judgement Ring, ranging from slowing the pointer's speed and adjusting the size of hit areas, to shrinking the ring or hiding hit areas.

== Synopsis ==
=== Setting and characters ===
Shadow Hearts is set in an alternate reality, taking place during 1913 and 1914 and mingling historical events and people with supernatural elements including divine beings and cosmic horror. The story takes place across China and Europe, with particular locations including Shanghai and London. A separate supernatural location is the Graveyard, a realm in protagonist Yuri Hyuga's soul tied to his abilities. The narrative of Shadow Hearts connects to the events of Koudelka, taking place after the latter's "Bad" ending.

The leads of Shadow Hearts are Yuri Hyuga, a Harmonixer capable of absorbing the souls of monsters and shapeshifting into them; and Alice Elliot, a young exorcist who helped her father banish harmful spirits. On their journey, they are joined by the sage Zhuzhen Liu, an expert in the magic of Yin and yang; Margarete Gertrude Zelle, an infamous spy and bomb expert; Keith Valentine, a centuries-old vampire who isolates himself from the outside world; and Halley Brancket, a street urchin and gang leader from London who possesses powerful magical abilities.

The main antagonist is initially introduced as "Roger Bacon"; his true identity is Albert Simon, a former Cardinal who achieved immortality and wields dark powers. The secondary antagonist is Dehuai, a powerful sorcerer obsessed with obtaining power over a dark god. Yuri's party are pursued by Japanese Army Lieutenant Colonel Yoshiko Kawashima and her subordinate Kato. Returning characters from Koudelka include its titular protagonist Koudelka Iasant, a Romani medium and mother of Halley; and the true Roger Bacon, a 12th-century philosopher who achieved imperfect immortality.

=== Plot ===
Following her father's murder, Alice is forced to accompany a Japanese escort to Shanghai. While on the train, Alice's escort is slaughtered by Albert Simon, who uses the name "Roger Bacon". Alice is saved by Yuri, who accompanies her due to the voice in his head and the two are joined by Zhuzhen and Margarete. During their journey to Shanghai, they are hunted by the Japanese army and Dehuai, who each want to control both China and the powerful Alice. Albert works in the background, furthering his own agenda. Yuri is secretly aided by Kawashima and Kato, who initially serve Japan but later secretly side with the group. Shortly after their arrival in Shanghai, Alice is kidnapped by Dehuai, who intends to use her powers in a forbidden summoning ritual which will destroy the Japanese occupying China and give him dominance over Eurasia.

The group storms Dehuai's base with help from Kawashima and Kato, an act for which Kawashima is later killed. The group defeats Dehuai, but Albert prevents them from halting the summoning, which brings an apocalyptic being called the Seraphic Radiance. Yuri attempts to Fuse with the Seraphic Radiance, but is consumed by its energy and goes berserk, starting a massive fire in the city. Six months later, the group is still searching for Yuri, who is eventually revealed to be in Keith Valentine's castle. As Yuri had been driven insane by the Seraphic Radiance, Alice goes into his soul to save him; this links her to Yuri's Malice and means the Graveyard will eventually claim her life. Alice then helps Yuri reconcile his fears of his heritage, and the two form a romantic attachment. Keith opts to join the group, and Margarete finds a lead to Albert's location in London. They run into Halley, whose mother Koudelka—the voice in Yuri's mind—is being tortured by Albert in an attempt to use her powers to fulfil his plans after Alice escaped.

The group attempt a rescue, but Albert incapacitates them. To save her son, Koudelka allows Albert to take her, revealing his true identity to the group before they leave. Pursuing them to Nemeton Monastery in Wales, the group meet the real Roger Bacon. Bacon reveals Simon's past as an idealistic disciple who was condemned and imprisoned by the Church for his progressive views; taking the name "Bacon" to spite his former master, Albert seeks to remake the world by summoning an extraterrestrial deity. To summon the deity, Albert needed the powers of either Alice or Koudelka to activate the Float, a stronghold built by a pre-human civilization which acts as a beacon for the deity. Cornering Albert, the group fail to prevent him raising the Float. They are teleported aboard the Float by Bacon, first defeating Albert, then being transported by the dying Albert to defeat the deity before it can reach Earth.

Following the deity's defeat, the group go their separate ways; Zhuzhen returns to China, Keith to his castle, Margarete takes on a new assignment, and Halley and Koudelka go to find his father in America. Alice's fate varies depending on the player's actions following Yuri's return. In the "Good" ending, unlocked by completing a specific side quest before the final battle, Yuri helps Alice defeat the Graveyard's ruling spirit Atman and saves her soul, allowing them to return together to her family in France. In the "Bad" ending, Alice's life is claimed by Atman and she dies as she travels with Yuri to France. Both endings conclude with a narration of the assassination of Archduke Franz Ferdinand of Austria, heralding the opening of World War I.

== Development ==
Shadow Hearts began development at Sacnoth for the PlayStation 2 (PS2) following the completion of Koudelka for the PlayStation in 1999. The game was directed and written by Matsuzo Machida (credited as Matsuzo Itakura), who had acted as art director for Koudelka. The producer was Sacnoth CEO Jun Mihara. The characters were designed by Miyako Kato. The concept behind Shadow Hearts was to create a grand RPG outside the typical fantasy worlds of the genre. According to Kazuo Okada, president and CEO of publisher Aruze, the game was intended to revive the RPG genre. Sacnoth had set out to create a good game more than make a profit. The Judgement Ring was inspired by the button combinations of beat 'em ups, although that genre's complex combinations were replaced by timed presses of a single button. Another source of inspiration was Aruze's pachinko machines. The Fusion system was created after the game's monsters had been designed. Itakura wanted to make more use of them, and designed the Fusion system to make use of the models and distinguish the game further from other RPGs.

For his writing, Machida was influenced by mangaka Go Nagai and screenwriter Keisuke Fujikawa, in addition to unspecified bedtime stories told to him by his mother. The game's scenario was inspired directly by Nagai's manga Devilman, which impressed Machida in his youth due to its dark tone. Similar to the ambiguous tone of Devilman, Machida did not want the scenario's characters to be clearly divided between good and evil, with the villains having understandable or even laudable motives behind their actions. The historic setting was influenced by Machida's love of history and his wish to create a game set apart from the traditional Western fantasy dominating the genre. He spent a long time researching the historic political situations during the game's time period so he could be as authentic as possible, using NPCs to convey the social conditions of the time. Due to time constraints, several planned inclusions ranging from political figures to famous writers had to be dropped. The title "Shadow Hearts" represented the darker aspects of humans often ignored in fiction but useful in accomplishing real-life tasks.

Yuri was directly inspired by Devilman protagonist Akira Fudo, and was meant to contrast with the standard JRPG protagonist of the time; he struck a balance between the androgynous norm of Japan and the more muscular builds found in Western games, and his silly and sometimes stupid attitude both represented his purity and set his personality apart from other genre protagonists. A key scene used by Machida to demonstrate his abnormal elements was the opening movie, where Yuri has his arm severed then reattaches it. Simons was modelled on the character of Hannibal Lecter as portrayed in the movie The Silence of the Lambs. Kato's character designs were guided by Machida's scenario draft. Her design direction for Simons was "an elegant English gentleman".

The CGI cutscenes were created by Digital Media Lab. For character models, the team created two types; a high detail version for CGI cutscenes and a low detail version for gameplay and real-time cutscenes. Yuji Nagano, head of the movie team, decided to give cutscenes an unreal feeling to them. Nagano was a novice at creating models for anything other than stiff or inorganic structures, making elements such as Alice's skirt in the CGI model a real challenge. To achieve the desired realistic effect without clipping, he used 130 bones for the skirt. There was little to no facial animation for real-time models, with emotions instead being expressed through body language. All the character models were animated by hand, with the team observing how people moved in their neighbourhood and doing their best to recreate particular movement patterns for each character. Fighting styles were copied from movies the team watched.

Due to bone count restrictions, the movement range of enemies was limited, prompting the team to deliberately make them stiff and awkward as a way of characterizing them. The monsters drew inspiration from creatures of H. P. Lovecraft's Cthulhu Mythos, putting them in contrast with the enemies of anime and movies of the time which were described by Machida as generic animal or prehistoric designs. The background environment designers made up the largest group within the Shadow Hearts development team, numbering eleven at its height. Research materials were bought at an early stage to ensure the backgrounds for urban areas matched their historical counterparts. Something the team needed to watch was the polygon and color counts, which had low restrictions for field graphics but a strict limit in battle arenas.

=== Music ===
The music of Shadow Hearts was composed by Yoshitaka Hirota, with additional contributions by Masaharu Iwata, Yasunori Mitsuda and Ryo Fukuda. Hirota wanted emulate Hiroki Kikuta's music for Koudelka, creating a score that was "beautiful yet destructive". The music combined elements of punk, new wave, industrial rock, techno, electronic rock and orchestra. The opening theme "Icaro", sung by the game's main vocalist Kyoko Kishikawa, was completed quickly for an internal demo. The theme became symbolic of Yuri and Alice's romance. The ending theme "Shadow Hearts" was composed by Hirota and sung by Hiroko Kasahara, with lyrics in English and Japanese by James H. Woan. Machida and Mihara respectively contributed to and were influenced by Hirota's work during production. A 2CD soundtrack album for the game, Shadow Hearts Original Soundtrack Plus1, was published by music label Scitron Digital Contents on June 18, 2001.

=== Release ===
Shadow Hearts was first announced in January 2001. The game was the first RPG published by Aruze. The game was among several notable PS2 games exhibited at the March 2001 Tokyo Game Show, alongside Final Fantasy X and Devil May Cry. The game was released on June 28, 2001. An official guidebook was published in July of that year by Enterbrain.

For its Western release, Shadow Hearts was published by Midway Games. The game was localized for Western release by Wordbox, with dubbing by TAJ Productions. Unlike Koudelka, which used English voice work across all regions, the original game was dubbed into English from Japanese with subtitles for different regions. The translation was done by Jeremy Blaustein, who had previously worked on the Pokémon anime series, Valkyrie Profile and Metal Gear Solid. During localization, Yuri's first name was changed from "Urmnaf". Blaustein chose "Yuri" as he wanted a name that sounded Russian to reflect the character's origins. Shadow Hearts launched in North America on December 12, 2001. In Europe, the game released on March 29, 2002.

== Reception ==
Reception

Aggregate score
Aggregator	Score
Metacritic	73/100 (24 reviews)

Review scores
Publication	Score
Computer and Video Games	7/10
Famitsu	30/40
GamePro	3.5/5
GameSpot	7.9/10
IGN	5.5/10
PlayStation Official Magazine – UK	7/10
RPGFan	85%

By the end of 2001, Shadow Hearts had sold nearly 104,000 units, being among the top 100 best-selling games of that year in the region. By the end of their 2001-2002 fiscal year, Aruze announced that the game had sold approximately 110,000 units in Japan; its low sales, together with underperformance of other titles, contributed to a loss within its console game division. Third-party retrospective reports indicated the series was not successful overseas, attributed by one source to close competition with Final Fantasy X. A contrasting official statement from Midway described Shadow Hearts as having "a proven audience". According to review aggregate site Metacritic, the game was given a score of 73 out of 100 based on 24 reviews, indicating "mixed or average" reviews.

The gameplay saw a mixed response from critics. Japanese gaming magazine Famitsu called the game an RPG that felt more "complete" than most others in the genre and positively commented on the battle system. Paul Davies of Computer and Video Games enjoyed the gameplay challenge and additional mechanics such as the Fusion system. Gaming magazine GamePro enjoyed the combat system but found the experience overly linear. GameSpot's Gerald Villoria was impressed by both the battle system's mechanics and the integration of character statistic systems such as Malice. Dean Mortlock of Official UK PlayStation 2 Magazine enjoyed the gameplay and its simplicity despite a lack of innovation. RPGFan's Mike Bracken noted that—aside from the Judgement Ring mechanic—Shadow Hearts followed too many traditions of the RPG genre. David Smith of IGN was less pleased, with one of his main complaints being its slow pace. The Judgement Ring was generally praised by critics, although both Villoria and Smith noted both real and potential frustrations with its use.

The story and characters were generally praised. Famitsu praised the "rich" personalities of the cast. Davies lauded the game's tone and style compared to most other RPGs at the time. By contrast, GamePro found the plot "predictable" and saw it as one of the game's only notable faults. Villoria called the plot "at once comical, scary, and most of all, exciting", praising the world design and characters. Smith felt that the story—while generally well-written and enjoyable—was negatively impacted by the game's sluggish pace. Mortlock called the narrative both "brain-crippling" and "interesting". Bracken gave praise to the characters and writing. The English voice acting was faulted by several critics.

Reviewers often found the graphics lacking. While Famitsu praised their quality, the reviewers felt that the character animations lacked polish. GamePro was similarly positive the graphics while feeling they fell short compared to other RPGs of the time. Bracken said the graphic quality was comparable to that of Koudelka when the latter game released, noting that it still fell short compared to other recent games. Davies negatively compared its graphics to the upcoming Final Fantasy X. Both Villoria and Smith praised the art direction and real-time character models; recurring criticisms were the less refined CGI models and low-detailed environment backgrounds. The game's music, by contrast, was met with general praise.

== Sequels ==
Following the release of Shadow Hearts, Sacnoth was rebranded as "Nautilus", continuing to work on both the Shadow Hearts series and Aruze's pachinko business. Their next game, Shadow Hearts: Covenant, was released in 2004 and acted as a direct sequel to the normal ending of Shadow Hearts, continuing Yuri's adventures. Much of the team later worked on the 2005 spin-off title, Shadow Hearts: From the New World. From the New World was the last game produced by the Sacnoth team before their eventual absorption into Aruze and ending of their game development duties.
