= Dive Alert =

1999 video game

- Matt's Version cover showing Matt and Becky
- Developer: Sacnoth
- Publisher: SNK
- Director: Satoru Yoshieda
- Artist: Miyako Kato
- Composers: Yoshitaka Hirota; Kazumi Mitome
- Platform: Neo Geo Pocket Color
- Release: JP: August 19, 1999; NA: April 2000
- Genre: Role-playing
- Modes: Single player, multiplayer

Dive Alert: Becky's Version (Note: Daivu Arāto: Rebecca Hen (ダイヴアラート レベッカ編; lit. Volume Rebecca) in Japan.) and Dive Alert: Matt's Version (Note: Daivu Arāto: Barn Hen (ダイヴアラート バーン編; lit. Volume Burn) in Japan.) are role-playing video games developed by Sacnoth for the Neo Geo Pocket Color. They were published by SNK in 1999 in Japan and 2000 in North America. Following the exploits of protagonists Becky and Matt as they complete missions on a flooded Earth to gain access to the remaining land of Terra, the gameplay involves the protagonist completing missions by fighting monsters and underwater crafts. The Japanese version is compatible with the console's Wireless Link adaptor for online multiplayer matches, while the Western version is limited to use of the console's physical link cable.

Sacnoth, a development partner for the console, produced the Dive Alert games in parallel with Koudelka for the PlayStation. Staff included character designer Miyako Kato, co-composer Yoshitaka Hirota, and Koudelka staff member Satoru Yoshieda as director. Dive Alert was Sacnoth's debut title in Japan. Its North American release was delayed due to difficulties releasing the Wireless Link in the region. It saw generally negative reviews from critics, with many faulting its slow pace and game design.

== Gameplay ==
A mission in Dive Alert, with the protagonist facing off against enemy units

Dive Alert: Becky's Version and Matt's Version are role-playing video games in which players take control of each titular protagonist, the commander of a submarine fleet tasked with exploring the world-covering ocean. The two versions are mostly identical, but feature different ships, enemies and upgrades. Submarine designs can be collected for use in the fleet, and are logged in a compendium for each version. There are multiple gameplay modes, including the main story campaign; a free battle mode for collecting experience points, materials and items; and a shooting minigame used to train players in the game's combat style. The game incorporates a multiplayer mode. If two consoles with the game installed are connected using the link cable, players can fight each other. The Japanese version allowed for online wireless multiplayer using the Wireless Link peripheral.

The game is split into missions interspersed with cutscenes. Battles take place in the ocean, divided into four depth layers and portrayed using a circular radar screen, the player at the centre and enemies or other elements appearing around them. The area is scanned with two types of sonar, one to show accurate surroundings and one focusing on enemy units. The player submarine can be extensively customized, ranging from the engine to armor to weapon types. Players attack enemies using weapons such as torpedoes and anti-submarine missiles, with weapon choice and effectiveness depending on the current depth, in addition to mines and decoys to throw off enemies. The submarine has finite air and battery life, both replenished on the surface. If the player's health is reduced to zero, the game ends and must be restarted from the last save.

== Synopsis ==
Earth was mostly submerged underwater due to an ancient catastrophe. The one remaining area of land is Terra, a supposed paradise managed by the artificial intelligence CDH (Cur Deus Homo) that only admits the worthy, while other humans are artificially born and placed in self-contained ocean vessels around the world. The protagonist, either Matt or Becky, goes on a mission to prove themselves worthy of entry into Terra by defeating the Automan, hostile beings which populate the ocean. Guided by a Navicom connected to CDH, the protagonist fulfils several missions and runs into a group called the Resistance, led by Sally and the rogue captain Arahim. Eventually, CDH is revealed to be the product of an attempt to rectify the flooding, but the human population ended up fighting against itself.

CDH, desperate to control the surviving population, manufactured the myth of Terra to keep humans in line, transforming those who qualified for life in Terra into the Automen to further the cycle. Terra itself is a ruined island with survivors living in fear of CDH. The protagonist, due to their skill, is singled out to destroy the Resistance and brainwashed using subliminal messaging to only believe its Navicom unit. Initially disbelieving, the protagonist defects and allies with the Resistance, prompting CDH to awaken guardians to kill them. Arahim, revealed to be one of CDH's creators, sacrifices himself to destroy it, allowing humanity including the protagonists to rebuild on Terra.

== Development and release ==
The Dive Alert titles were developed by Sacnoth, a video game company founded by Hiroki Kikuta with funding from publisher SNK, acting as one of their development partners for the Neo Geo Pocket Color (NGPC) handheld. Dive Alert was developed in parallel with Koudelka for the PlayStation. Koudelka program director Satoru Yoshieda acted as the game's director. The art was designed by Miyako Kato, while Matsuzo Machida (credited then as Matsuzo Itakura) was art director. The music was co-composed by Yoshitaka Hirota and Kazumi Mitome. Hirota had trouble creating the music as there were only three sound layers−the melody, the countermelody, and the bass line−and an additional sound effect channel used for drum beats.

The titles were Sacnoth's first Japanese release, and formed part of the console's early game library. The game released in Japan on August 19, 1999. Originally scheduled for release the same year in North America, it was delayed due to difficulties certifying the Wireless Link adapter for release outside Japan. Ultimately it was released without access to the Wireless Link, which failed FCC certification. The lead characters' names were changed for North America; Becky was called Rebecca in Japanese, while Matt was originally called Burn. It was released in North America in April 2000. It was one of only two NGPC titles released outside Japan during the spring of 2000, and one of the last NGPC games released in North America.

== Reception ==
Reception

Review scores
Publication	Score
Famitsu	23/40
Game Informer	3.25/10
IGN	4/10
Pocket Gamer	F

In a preview article on the console's current and upcoming games, Gamers' Republic cited Dive Alert as an "interesting" title due to its use of wireless multiplayer. GamePro felt that the multiplayer element was the highlight and would be the main draw for players. The game was covered in the first issue of Mr Dreamcast, where its uniqueness was noted but it was generally faulted for boring gameplay and dialogue.

In Japanese gaming magazine Famitsu, the game was scored 23 out of 40 points. Craig Harris of IGN reviewed both versions, noting their near-identical content. He found it inferior to Sacnoth's later NGPC title Faselei!, faulting the slow pace of gameplay and uninteresting battle UI. The magazine Pocket Gamer, as part of a feature on the console for its first issue, was very negative about the title, saying its premise was wasted on uninteresting gameplay and poor dialogue despite good-looking cutscenes. Kurt Kalata, writing for Hardcore Gaming 101, noted the lack of Dive Alert from the first Neo Geo Pocket Color Collection.
