= Faselei! =

1999 video game

- Developer: Sacnoth
- Publisher: SNK
- Director: Matsuzo Machida
- Producer: Jun Mihara
- Artist: Miyako Kato
- Writer: Matsuzo Machida
- Composers: Yoshitaka Hirota; Kazumi Mitome
- Platform: Neo Geo Pocket Color
- Release: JP: 22 December 1999; UK: June 2000
- Genre: Tactical role-playing
- Modes: Single player Multiplayer

Faselei! (Note: Japanese: ファーゼライ!, Hepburn: Fāzerai!) is a tactical role-playing game developed by Sacnoth for the Neo Geo Pocket Color. It was published by SNK in 1999 in Japan and 2000 in the United Kingdom. A prospective North American release was cancelled when the console was pulled from sale. Following the exploits of the titular mech-piloting mercenary group during a civil war, the gameplay focuses on combat using mechs, with actions determined by commands input using a pool of action points.

The game was the last title developed by Sacnoth under SNK, and their last for the Neo Geo Pocket Color. It was directed and written by Matsuzo Machida, had character designs by Miyako Kato, and music by Yoshitaka Hirota. In contemporary and retrospective reviews, Faselei! saw praise for its gameplay and technical achievements. Several journalists have named it one of the platform's best titles. Machida, Kato and Hirota would later collaborate on Sacnoth's Shadow Hearts series.

== Gameplay ==
A battle in Faselei!; the selected mech is given movement commands.

Faselei! is a tactical role-playing game where players take on the role of Shotaro Kurosawa, member of the titular mercenary group, across thirteen story chapters. The game features three modes; the story campaign, a battle mode used for earning in-game currency and items, and a multiplayer versus mode. In the latter, two consoles with the game installed can be connected via a link cable allowing battles between mechs, with the winner taking a variety of prizes from the loser ranging from items to the defeated mech. Combat is performed using the TS (Toy Soldier) mechs, which can be switched out for new models, upgraded and outfitted with different abilities, weapons and supplies between missions. Completing a mission quickly will award a higher rank, raising Shotaro's standing and granting access to a wider selection of items between missions.

During combat, the player directly controls Shotaro's TS, with him usually assigned one combat partner driven by the game's artificial intelligence. The turn-based battles play from a top-down perspective, with units represented with sprites across a map. Rather than selecting commands from a menu, players use equipped functions called Chips, issuing commands to the TS which it automatically carries out. Commands range from basic movement and attacks to later unlocking more advanced abilities such as examining enemy unit statistics. Depending on the terrain and enemy movements, assigned actions can be interrupted and cancelled. The number of Chip commands is limited by the action bar, though this can be either upgraded between missions or expanded using special Chips to enable more actions per turn.

== Synopsis ==
The game is set during 2099 in the aftermath of World War III. The Middle Eastern nation of Istar attempted to broker peace between the surviving nations, but its king was assassinated and his two sons ended up in conflict. The older son, Aerbel, established himself as dictator of Istar with the backing of the Syrian military, while the younger, Kein, formed the rebel faction. Shotaro Kurosawa works for the 13th Independent Armoured Division, also called Faselei, a mercenary group in the employ of the rebels. Faselei successfully pushes back the Istar army, with Shotaro regularly clashing with leading Istar soldier Alen Zemecks, later revealed to have assassinated Istar's king for personal reasons. Aerbel is eventually deposed and killed, but Zemecks retreats to a base in Syrian territory, planning to unleash a nuclear weapon and trigger another war. Faselei successfully stop the weapon, Zemecks kills himself after his final defeat by Shotaro, and Faselei are rescued from the Syrian army by the intervention of the United Nations Forces.

== Development and release ==
Faselei! was developed by Sacnoth, a company founded by former Square composer Hiroki Kikuta with funding from SNK, creators of the Neo Geo Pocket Color (NGPC) handheld console. It was Sacnoth's final project for SNK, and their final product for the NGPC. It was directed by Matsuzo Machida (credited as Matzuso Itakura), and produced by Jun Mihara, who would become Sacnoth's CEO. The character designs were created by Miyako Kato, who had also worked on Sacnoth's Dive Alert. Additional artwork was contributed by Machida, Takamusa Ohsawa, and mech designer Minoru Saegusa. The music was co-composed by Yoshitaka Hirota and Kazumi Mitome. As with his work on Dive Alert, Hirota had to create music with only three sound layers−the melody, the countermelody, and the bass line−and an additional sound effect channel used for drum beats.

The game was first announced in August 1999, releasing in Japan on 22 December of that year. Its Western release was confirmed in February 2000, originally planned for March of that year. It was featured in advertisements during E3 in May 2000, with its Western release date being announced as June of that year. While Faselei received a limited release in the United Kingdom, the North American release was cancelled in the wake of Aruze acquiring SNK and shutting down its North American offices in 2000 following the NGPC's commercial failure. The UK version had prepared shipments of 10,000 units, an average run for an NGPC title at the time. Unconfirmed estimates placed the number of UK copies in circulation at 5000 as of 2004.

The sudden closure of SNK's American branch and the short notice of the game's regional cancellation meant that preview builds and advertisements had already been sent out to the press. North American cartridges of Faselei! were originally shipped back to Japan for recycling, then were sold to liquidators when SNK was wound up and ended up in circulation through the internet and as part of a later reissue of the console in North America. A complete boxed English release has become a collector's item. Multiple staff members, including Machida, Kato, Hirota and Ohsawa would go on to hold central roles on Sacnoth's Shadow Hearts series.

== Reception ==
Reception

Review scores
Publication	Score
Electronic Gaming Monthly	8/8.5/8/7.5
Famitsu	24/40
Game Informer	8.5/10
Pocket Gamer	C−
RPGFan	85%
Silicon Magazine	82/100

In Japanese gaming magazine Famitsu, the game was scored 24 out of 40 points, a relatively low score for the magazine. The reviewer for Game Informer praised it as one of the best titles released for the console, noting its storyline and praising its gameplay and customisation. Electronic Gaming Monthly noted some cliched dialogue and its interface as negatives, but otherwise praised its narrative and gameplay. The magazine Pocket Gamer, as part of a feature on the console for its first issue, was less positive than other outlets. The writer faulted the storyline as disjointed and its interface as cumbersome, but lauding the gameplay and its multiplayer functions.

In a 2011 article for Hardcore Gaming 101, John Szczepaniak called it "a wonderful little game", citing its gameplay and narrative tone as positives despite balancing issues. In a 2019 review for RPGFan, Pete Leavitt cited it as the best NGPC game released in the West, saying: "This is not a case of mystique masking the flaws of a rare game that isn't actually good. Faselei! is beautifully complete, and wherever possible, it must be played." Nick Thorpe, writing for the Retro Gamer website, called it "one of the most essential games for the [NGPC]", citing its storyline and gameplay compared to other titles on the console.

In a 2004 retrospective article on SNK, GameSpot noted Faselei! as one of the most eagerly anticipated NGPC titles for North America due to its visual and audio achievements. In a retrospective article on rare or overlooked video game titles in 2004, GMR called it a well-loved game, citing its gameplay depth and technical accomplishments on the platform. As part of an article on the console in its August 2005 issue, Retro Gamer listed Faselei! as one of the ten best games for the system, highlighting it as "an incredibly absorbing strategy title" and mentioning its then-high resale value. Faselei! was also included as one of the titles in the 2010 book 1001 Video Games You Must Play Before You Die. In 2014, HobbyConsolas identified Faselei! as one of the twenty best games for the platform. Likewise, Time Extension regarded it as one of the best games for the NGPC.
