= Shadow Hearts: From the New World =

2005 video game

- PAL cover art, featuring the playable cast.
- Developer: Nautilus
- Publishers: JP: Aruze; NA: Xseed Games; EU: Ghostlight
- Director: Takamusa Ohsawa
- Producer: Takamusa Ohsawa
- Designer: Takehiro Ishida
- Programmer: Takaaki Ishikawa
- Artist: Miyako Kato
- Writer: Toshiyuki Suzuki
- Composers: Yoshitaka Hirota; Tomoko Imoto; Ryo Fukuda
- Series: Shadow Hearts
- Platform: PlayStation 2
- Release: JP: July 28, 2005; NA: March 7, 2006; EU: May 25, 2007; AU: June 7, 2007
- Genre: Role-playing
- Mode: Single player

Shadow Hearts: From the New World (Note: Shadōhātsu Furomu za Nyūwārudo (Japanese: シャドウハーツ・フロム・ザ・ニューワールド)) is a role-playing video game developed by Nautilus (Sacnoth) for the PlayStation 2. It was published in Japan by Aruze in 2005, in North America by Xseed Games in 2006, and in Europe by Ghostlight in 2007. From The New World is the third and final game in the Shadow Hearts series, acting as both a continuation of the series narrative and a spin-off featuring new characters.

Set in an alternate version of the Americas during the Prohibition era, the story follows amnesiac private investigator Johnny Garland, who travels with the Native American Shania in pursuit of a malevolent being known as Lady. During gameplay, the player controls a group led by Johnny exploring various locations across the Americas. During battle, a party of up to four characters can be controlled, with actions in battle relying on a timing-based system dubbed the Judgement Ring. The game's worldview combines alternate history with elements of Lovecraftian horror.

From the New World was produced on a tight schedule, with several staff members returning from Shadow Hearts: Covenant; Covenant art director Takamusa Ohsawa acted as director and producer, while Miyako Kato and Yoshitaka Hirota returned respectively as character designer and lead composer. It was treated as a fresh start for the team due to its setting and characters. The development team focused on refining the mechanics introduced in Covenant. Debuting to low sales, the game was generally well received by critics. Despite plans to continue the Shadow Hearts series, From the New World was the last game development by Nautilus before their absorption into Aruze and departure from game development. Some team members including Kato, Hirota and series creator Matsuzo Machida began work on a spiritual successor titled Penny Blood in 2019.

== Gameplay ==
A battle in Shadow Hearts: From the New World; battle actions depend on proper use of the Judgement Ring. Shown is the character Shania, capable of the "Fusion" transformation skill, executing a magical attack.

Shadow Hearts: From the New World is a role-playing video game (RPG) where players take control of a party led by main protagonist Johnny Garland as they progress through the game; progress is split between a linear story-driven first half and a second half which allows greater exploration and access to optional areas. During gameplay, the party explores a number of town and country areas across the Americas from a fixed-camera third-person perspective, collecting and buying items and equipment, talking to non-playable characters who act as quest givers and merchants, solving environmental puzzles, and completing both story-centered quests and side quests.

The turn-based battles are triggered through both random and scripted encounters. Each player character has hit points (health), skill points (magic), and sanity points (SP). SP ordinarily decrease once per turn, and when a character runs out of SP they go berserk and cannot be controlled by the player. Each character has two basic attack types; single attacks which range from normal attacks to powerful "Hard Hit", and double attacks which allow one character to take two actions in a single turn.

Characters, including enemy groups, can use combos with two or more characters. Characters link up to perform a succession of compatible attacks. There are two combo types; standard combos and double combos, which are mechanically similar to double attacks. Double attacks and all combos draw from a "Stock" gauge which is filled by attacking or being attacked. After each battle, the party gains experience points which raise their level, permanently raising health, magic and SP. Greater experience and more valuable items are awarded for good battle performance. New skills are attained by each character through story-driven side quests.

Central to combat is the Judgement Ring. Represented as a disc with colored areas on its surface, the player's aim is to hit those areas as a pointer passes over them. If the player fails to hit an area, the attack can either be shortened or cancelled altogether. Small red-colored "Strike" areas boost the power of an action, while magic attacks have increasingly dark hues near the end of a hit area, with hits in those areas making the spell more powerful. The Judgement Ring is used for every battle action, from standard attacks and special abilities to using items. Players can choose to automate the Judgement Ring, but this removes the Strike option and decreases action power. During combos, missing a hit area on the Judgement Ring breaks the rest of the combo and removes any subsequent character's turns. After a certain point in the game, the Judgement Ring can be customised for each character, potentially easing the difficulty. The Judgement Ring is also used in other gameplay areas, such as gaining discounts from shops and in some mini-games.

A power unique to main heroine Shania is Fusion; during the course of the story, Shania unlocks the ability to transform into different monstrous forms, altering her stats and giving her unique abilities. Each Fusion costs SP, and while in a Fusion form SP decreases with each turn. Fusions are increased in strength using Spirit energy collected after each battle, which is fed into collectable totems associated with each form. For characters other than Shania, magic is unlocked using Stellar Charts. Each character equips compatible Stellar items in slots, which give a character access to different spells. The Stellar Charts can be upgraded and expanded, allowing for new and more powerful abilities to be incorporated.

== Synopsis ==
=== Setting and characters ===
From the New World is set in an alternate reality, taking place in 1929 during the Prohibition era and mingling historical events and people with supernatural elements including divine beings and cosmic horror. The story is set exclusively in the Americas, with locations ranging from North American areas including New York City and Las Vegas, and South American regions such as the Guianas and ruins of the Maya civilization. While taking place in the same reality as and featuring cameos from Shadow Hearts and Shadow Hearts: Covenant, the story is separate from the rest of the canon.

The main protagonist is Johnny Garland, a teenage private detective who is searching for his forgotten past following a car accident that killed the rest of his family. He is saved from death by Shania, a Native American priestess capable of transforming into monstrous forms in battle after forming pacts with powerful spirits. The pair are joined by Natan, Shania's bounty hunter bodyguard; Frank Goldfinger, a self-proclaimed master ninja; Master Mao, an anthropomorphic cat; Ricardo Gomez, a mariachi-playing gunman; and Hildergard "Hilda" Valentine, a member of the recurring Valentine vampire clan.

The main antagonists are Lady, a mute woman who can infect others with Malice; Killer, a serial killer who becomes her companion; and Professor Gilbert, an immoral researcher obsessed with Malice. A key supporting character is Roger Bacon, a 12th century philosopher who achieved imperfect immortality and a recurring character in the Shadow Hearts series.

=== Plot ===
Johnny is hired by Gilbert to track down Marlow Brown. Upon finding him in an abandoned opera house, Brown is terrified of Johnny, and is shortly killed by a monster that appears from a portal. Johnny is saved by Shania, who was hunting the monster. Since the release of the dark energy Malice into the world during the events of Covenant, Shania and her companion Natan help keep monsters spawned from Malice in check, along with hunting for those who destroyed Shania's tribe. Johnny and Shania team up and locate Gilbert at Arkham University, who reveals his true intentions to unleash Malice upon the world before escaping. Meanwhile, in Brooklyn, a wanted criminal codenamed "Killer" escapes police pursuit and is fatally injured. He encounters a mysterious mute woman who kills his pursuers and gives him a "Kiss of Malice", healing his wounds. Grateful, he dubs the woman as "Lady" and stays with her.

As Johnny and Shania investigate—picking up Frank and Mao along the way—Lady makes her way across North America, seeking out concentrations of Malice. Shania identifies Lady as the being responsible for the attack on her tribe. At one point, Lady gives her Kiss of Malice to Gomez's girlfriend Edna, who is corrupted and turned into a monster Gomez is forced to kill; this leads him to join Johnny's party. They also rescue the vampire Hilda and Roger Bacon from Area 51. At the same time, Gilbert teams up with Lady and a reluctant Killer as Lady is drawn to several South American ruins, unlocking the seals on concentrated pockets of Malice. This summons a massive structure known as the Gate, from which Malice and monsters would pour into the world if opened. The group fail to stop them, and during one encounter Lady kisses Shania, infecting her with Malice.

To stop the Gate from opening, Johnny's group travels to Salar de Uyuni to locate an artifact imbued with the power of "Will", a blue light that counterbalances Malice. Killer arrives and attacks them, fatally wounding Johnny. Johnny transforms into a being similar to Lady and attacks the group, forcing Shania to release the Will and return Johnny to normal. This stalls the Gate's opening, but does not stop it due to Lady's presence there. Suspicious of his past, Johnny returns to his family home and discovers that he and his sister Grace died in a car crash. His father teamed up with Brown to steal the mystical Émigré Manuscript from Bacon and perform a resurrection ritual on Johnny and Grace using the combined energies of Malice and Will. The ritual went wrong, and Grace sacrificed her Will to preserve Johnny, turning her into Lady.

Johnny accepts the need for Lady's death and travels to the Gate with his companions. Before the final battle, Shania reveals that she may become a monster due to the Malice inside her. The group storm the Gate, fighting first Killer—whose death causes Lady to show emotion for the first time—then a Malice-mutated Gilbert. The party kill Lady, escaping before the Gate vanishes, and go their separate ways. After this point, two endings are unlocked. In the "Bad" ending, Shania is consumed by the Malice. In the "Good" ending, unlocked by obtaining an optional Fusion and maxing out Shania's powers, Shania is cleansed of Malice and works with Johnny at his agency.

== Development ==
From the New World was developed by Nautilus (formerly known as Sacnoth), featuring the same production team that created Shadow Hearts and its sequel. The game was produced and directed by Takamusa Ohsawa, who previously served as art director for Covenant. The characters were designed by series artist Miyako Kato. The lead game designer was Takehiro Ishida, and the scenario was written by Toshiyuki Suzuki, with the story concept being provided by former director and scenario writer Matsuzo Machida. The game's production was completed on "an extremely tight schedule", presenting challenges to different team members caused by this. It was also stated that the production had a "more controlled system" compared to the previous two titles, leading to a tonal shift from the series earlier darker tone. The director was also replaced midway through production. By March 2005, the game was 60% complete.

While previous Shadow Hearts titles were based on the Eurasian continent, From the New World moved to the Americas, giving the developers a fresh start. The new setting and characters allowed the team to create a beginner-friendly narrative which would attract a larger audience, with the story being a spin-off only loosely connected to the events of Shadow Hearts and Covenant. Rather than portraying a grand mythology, the narrative focused on individuals within the struggle created within the Shadow Hearts series. Despite its spin-off status, the team treated Johnny with the gravity of a mainline Shadow Hearts protagonist. While the series continued to use real locations, the team did not want to be too realistic, so added in anachronistic locations. Ishida, who had worked on the series since Covenant, was in charge of the battle system. It was based on the system used in Covenant, although new elements such as the stock gauge were added to increase strategy. The battle system expansions, which included the ability for enemies to use combo attacks, were done based on a combination of staff wishes and fan feedback.

Kato designed all the characters, with some going through notable redesigns; one was Natan, whose early character design was far leaner than his final appearance. For Shania's Fusion forms, she was given the direction to make them appear like goddesses rather than monsters. The game used a modified version of the Covenant engine. More detailed character expressions were incorporated, and load times were decreased. Unlike Covenant, From the New World used only one PS2 DVD, which caused problems with data storage. The CGI cutscenes were created by computer graphics studio Avant, with motion capture being handled by Dynapix. Avant had previously created the CGI cutscenes for Covenant. Many of the motion capture actors had previously worked on Covenant. The real-time cutscenes were made more cinematic, with more attention paid to camera angles and character movement. Despite the change to a lighter atmosphere, monster designs continued to draw inspiration from H. P. Lovecraft's Cthulhu Mythos, an influence reaching back to the first Shadow Hearts.

=== Music ===
Yoshitaka Hirota, composer for the previous two Shadow Hearts games, returned for From the New World. Hirota was joined by Ryo Fukuda, who collaborated on the first Shadow Hearts, and Tomoko Imoto and Hirotomi Imoto. Imoto also acted as sound director. For the music, Hirota researched Native American music and made heavy use of vocals and ethnic music, fusing ancient instruments with electronic elements. The series theme "Icaro" was reprised in an arranged form. Choral work was led by Akiko Shikata. The main theme "Spread My Wings" was composed by Hirota, and was performed and written by Takehara Tomoaki from the indie funk band Taste of Chocolate. A soundtrack album was released by Team Entertainment on August 24, 2005 in parallel with an arrange album of tracks from across the Shadow Hearts series.

=== Release ===
From the New World was first announced by publisher Aruze in March 2005, with the first trailer being included in the director's cut edition of Covenant. The game was released in the region on July 28, 2005. It came in both standard and limited editions. The latter included a soundtrack CD, and additional merchandise including a themed T-shirt and keyholder. Other separate merchandise was produced, including several guidebooks, and an artbook which included character illustrations and developer commentary.

While previous Shadow Hearts games were localised by Midway Games, From the New World was licensed for a North American release by Xseed Games. At the time, Xseed was a fairly new company, and From the New World was one of its earliest major localizations, having successfully secured Western release rights alongside Wild Arms 4. As with the previous two Shadow Hearts games, the localization was handled by Jeremy Blaustein. Blaustein was brought on board the project by Xseed. The voice acting was an important element for the English release, who cast actors based on the regional accents of characters. According to a later interview, Xseed were under pressure due to most of their resources being tied up with Wild Arms 4, and while they were impressed by the English dub, the written script had a number of issues and needed to be proofed and edited for consistency. The game was released in North America on March 6, 2006. In Europe, the game was licensed for publication by Ghostlight. From the New World was released in Europe on May 25, 2007. An Australasian release followed on June 7.

== Reception ==
Reception

Aggregate score
Aggregator	Score
Metacritic	76/100 (42 reviews)

Review scores
Publication	Score
Eurogamer	7/10
Famitsu	35/40
GamePro	3.5/5
GameSpot	8.2
GameSpy	4/5
IGN	7.8/10
PALGN	8/10
RPGFan	90%

During its debut week, From the New World reached third place in sales charts, reaching nearly 52,000 units. By the end of the year, the game had sold over 82,000 units. Despite general low sales for their game business division, Aruze credited the release of From the New World with that division showing a profit that year. Speaking in 2020, Xseed Games parent company CEO Ken Berry noted that the market demand for From the New World in the West was sufficient alongside that for Wild Arms 4 to keep Xseed Games going.

Japanese gaming magazine Famitsu gave much praise to the narrative and its characters, noting the use of comedy and numerous side stories related to each player character. Rob Fahay of Eurogamer enjoyed the story's pacing, but found the amount of humour off-putting compared to the balance struck in Covenant and took longer to like the cast. GamePro found the varied cast to be the game's strongest element, and GameSpot's Bethany Massimilla said the story "remains compelling (if insane) throughout". GameSpy's Gerald Villoria felt that the storyline lack cohesion, Jeremy Dunham of IGN criticised an imbalance between dungeon exploration and narrative that negatively affected an otherwise-enjoyable story. PALGN's Tristan Kalogeropoulos noted the more absurd storyline and characters compared to earlier Shadow Hearts games, and negatively noted the stereotypes of American culture and history used in the game. RPGFan's Patrick Gann lauded the storytelling and characters, but was disappointed by the game's "good" ending as it ran against the themes of both the game and the series.

Famitsu noted that the game seemed to have solid production values. Massimilla though the environment and dungeon designs were repetitive, but praised the character designs as the strongest aspect of the game's visuals. Villoria similarly praised the character designs, and Dunham cited the graphics and CGI cutscenes as one of the game's strengths despite lacking higher resolution or widescreen support. Kalogeropoulos praised the CGI and real-time cutscenes, while Gann lauded the amount of effort put into the visual and stylistic presentation by Nautilus. The voice acting divided opinion; some gave praise, while others faulted it. In contrast, the music was met with a generally positive response.

The gameplay was described by Famitsu simply as "an orthodox RPG", while Fahay commented that "the battle system remains just as strong and compelling as it was in Covenant". GamePro enjoyed the battle system, but found the Stellar upgrades underdeveloped and was extremely critical of puzzle designs. Massimilla enjoyed the combat options, but disliked both the dungeon design and the reliance of character progression on side quests. Villoria praised the breadth and depth of combat, but found the random encounters underwhelming compared to the scripted boss fights. Dunham enjoyed the additions and tweaks to the battle system, but faulted the dungeon design. Kalogeropoulos praised the battle system for encouraging player interaction in actions normally governed by chance in RPGs in addition to the variety of move types, but noted that the character growth system was geared more towards completionists than casual players. Gann lauded the game design, but noted that there were still weak parts of the overall design inherent to the Shadow Hearts series; like other reviewers, he criticised the dungeon design.

== Legacy ==
Speaking in a later interview, Machida said that From the New World was not the true Shadow Hearts III, which would have continued the story of original protagonist Yuri Hyuga. His plan had been for Shadow Hearts III to follow Jinpachiro Hyuga and Kiheita Inugami, the respective fathers of Yuri and Covenant character Kurando Inugami. Ultimately, From the New World was the last Shadow Hearts title to be released; Nautilus was absorbed into Aruze in 2007 and ended video game production, ultimately ceasing to exist during corporate restructuring in 2009. Machida was approached three times about developing a new Shadow Hearts, but each time the project was cancelled due to "the company’s circumstances". Machida, Kato and Hirota later came together to work on Penny Blood, a spiritual successor to the Shadow Hearts series.
