= Shadow Hearts: Covenant =

2004 role-playing video game

- North American box art, showing protagonist Karin Koenig.
- Developer: Nautilus
- Publishers: JP: Aruze; WW: Midway Games
- Director: Matsuzo Machida
- Producer: Asako Oikawa
- Designer: Takehiro Ishida
- Programmer: Izumi Hamamoto
- Artist: Miyako Kato
- Writer: Matsuzo Machida
- Composers: Yoshitaka Hirota; Yasunori Mitsuda; Kenji Ito
- Series: Shadow Hearts
- Platform: PlayStation 2
- Release: JP: February 19, 2004; NA: September 27, 2004; PAL: March 11, 2005
- Genre: Role-playing
- Mode: Single-player

Shadow Hearts: Covenant (Note: Known in Japan as Shadow Hearts II (Japanese: シャドウハーツII, Hepburn: Shadōhātsu Tsū).) is a role-playing video game developed by Nautilus (Sacnoth) for the PlayStation 2, and is the second entry in the Shadow Hearts series. Published in Japan by Aruze in 2004, the game was released internationally by Midway Games in 2004 (North America) and 2005 (Europe). A director's cut with additional content was released in Japan in 2005.

Covenant takes place in 1915, six months after the events of the first game. At the height of World War I, German Army lieutenant Karin Koenig is drawn into a conflict between original protagonist Yuri Hyuga and the secret society Sapientes Gladio. During gameplay, the player explores various locations through a growing party of characters. Four characters take part in turn-based battles against a variety of enemies, with actions relying on a timing-based system dubbed the Judgment Ring. The game's worldview combines alternate history with elements of Lovecraftian horror.

Covenant began development in the autumn of 2002; returning staff members included writer and director Matsuzo Machida, artist Miyako Kato, and composer Yoshitaka Hirota. The team redesigned the battle system and altered the story's tone based on feedback from the first game's players. The localization was handled by Jeremy Blaustein, who remembered the game as one of his favorite projects. Selling around 240,000 units in Japan and North America, the game was praised by reviewers. It has since been ranked by several journalistic sites as one of the best games of its time. A third Shadow Hearts title, Shadow Hearts: From the New World, was released in 2005.

== Gameplay ==
A battle in Shadow Hearts: Covenant: battle actions depend on the proper use of the Judgment Ring. Shown is one part of a "Combo Trial" between multiple characters.

Shadow Hearts is a role-playing video game (RPG) where players take control of a party led by either Karin Koenig or Yuri Hyuga as they progress through the game; progress is split between a linear story-driven first half and a second-half which allows greater exploration and access to optional areas. During gameplay, the party explores a number of towns and country areas across the Eurasian continent, collecting and buying items and equipment, talking to non-playable characters who act as quests givers and merchants, and completing both story-centered quests and side quests.

The game's turn-based battles are triggered through both random and scripted encounters. Turn order is dependent on a character's "speed" statistic. Each player character has hit points (health), skill points (magic), and sanity points (SP). SP ordinarily decreases once per turn, and when a character runs out of SP they go berserk and cannot be controlled by the player. Actions include a variety of normal attacks, special attacks specific to characters which are earned through side tasks, Crest magic which can be assigned to different characters, Items such as healing and modifiers for character abilities, and defending against attacks. After each battle, characters earn experience points to raise their level and character attributes, and Soul energy from defeated monsters. The higher a character's level, the more Crests can be equipped.

A key element of gameplay is the Judgment Ring. Represented as a disc with colored areas on its surface, the player's aim is to hit those areas as a pointer passes over them. If the player fails to hit an area, the attack can either be shortened or canceled altogether. Magic attacks use green hit areas during the initial stages of an attack. For items, blue hit areas are used with increasing hue; the deeper the hue when the player triggers the action, the more effective that item is on its target. The final portion of each target area is red, and if the player hits it the attack or skill is boosted in power. The Judgment Ring is also used outside battle in shops; when shopping at a merchant, hitting the right areas can discount prices and increase sale values for items.

The Judgment Ring is used with every battle action, from standard attacks and special abilities to item use. Some status ailments impact how the Judgment Rings behave. An individual character's Judgment Ring moves at a different speed, and can be customized; options include adjusting hit zone numbers, increasing hit area size, increasing damage while decreasing hit area size, and activating an auto-battle option at the cost of attack power. Characters, including some enemy types, can use combos with two or more characters. Combos require successful use of the Judgment Ring, in addition to a button trigger to continue and complete the combo. If the button input fails, or a non-compatible ability is used, the combo is broken and all remaining characters lose their turn actions. Each successful hit in a combo increases damage for the next character's action. Using four characters in a successful combo triggers a fifth special magical attack.

A key ability for both Yuri and late-game playable character Kurando Inugami is Fusion, the ability to transform into a monstrous creature with access to unique abilities. Character attributes are also changed depending on the Fusion type. New fusions for Yuri are unlocked in the Graveyard, a realm within his soul accessed either at save points or on the world map. Charging gravestones with Soul energy gathered from defeated enemies unlocks new Fusions within a specific group. Activating a Fusion costs a set amount of SP, with additional SP reduced each turn by an amount dictated by the Fusion form's power.

== Synopsis ==
=== Setting and characters ===
Shadow Hearts is set in an alternate reality, taking place in the year 1915 during World War I, and mingling historical events and people with supernatural elements including divine beings and cosmic horror. The story shifts locations between Europe, Russia, the Near East and Japan. Another key location is the metaphysical Graveyard. The story takes place six months after the events of Shadow Hearts, following on from that game's "bad" ending.

The main protagonists are Karin Koenig, a German Army lieutenant; and Yuri Hyuga, the main protagonist of Shadow Hearts. Following the events of Shadow Hearts which culminated in the death of his lover Alice Elliot, a depressed Yuri buried Alice in Domrémy-la-Pucelle, taking it upon himself to defend the town from the War. During their journey, Karin and Yuri are joined by a large cast including Gepetto, Alice's uncle; Blanca, an intelligent wolf-like dog; Joachim Valentine, a vampire obsessed with wrestling; Lucia, a fortune teller; a fictionalized version of Anastasia Nikolaevna; and Kurando Inugami, a swordsman from Japan.

The main antagonists are members of Sapientes Gladio, a formerly peaceful secret society perverted into a terrorist group; key characters are its current leader Grigori Rasputin, and his right hand man Nicolai Conrad. Additional characters include Roger Bacon, a 12th century philosopher who achieved imperfect immortality; Kato, a former ally of Yuri's; Jeanne, a young girl from Domrémy; Shadow Hearts antagonist Albert Simon, who appears as a vision in Yuri's mind; Jovis Abraham, the original co-founder of Sapientes Gladio; the Japanese foreign minister Kantaro Ishimura; and Ouka, a cloned version of Kato's dead lover Yoshiko Kawashima.

=== Plot ===
During a mission to Domrémy, Karin's unit is attacked by a demon. To combat him, Karin is partnered with Nicolai to retrieve an artifact called the Holy Mistletoe from Apoina Tower in the Vatican City. Returning to Domrémy, the "demon" turns out to be Yuri, and Nicolai reveals his true goal of destroying Yuri before he can threaten Sapientes Gladio while holding the girl Jeanne hostage. Yuri ends up impaled by the Mistletoe, which begins disrupting his powers and releasing trapped Malice, dark energy generated by monsters. During the attacks on Domrémy, Jeanne is killed, and in Yuri's journey, her spirit resides in the Graveyard. Nicolai blackmails Yuri into retrieving the forbidden Émigré Manuscript in exchange for releasing the captured Roger Bacon. The group is double-crossed and ultimately rescues Bacon, although Nicolai takes the Émigré Manuscript. Guided by Bacon, they head to Russia to face Rasputin. Rasputin is fuelling the war through Sapientes Gladio and an alliance with Japanese sympathizers, his ultimate goal being to replace Nicholas II of Russia with Nicolai, the tzar's illegitimate heir. After learning of Rasputin's invulnerability due to his pact with the god Asmodeus, the group flees Russia along with the endangered Anastasia.

To overcome Rasputin's power, the group finds Abraham; he reveals that Albert Simons' actions during the events of Shadow Hearts were an attempt to foil Rasputin. Yuri travels inside his soul with Karin's help, meeting Simons' spirit and taming the god Amon. The group returns to Russia, exposing Rasputin. Defeated by Amon, Rasputin sacrifices his soul to Asmodeus, who takes over his body and summons a magical fortress, aiming to obliterate humanity. Prior to leaving, Nicolai confronts Rasputin, revealing that he has made a pact with the god Astaroth. Yuri's group defeats Rasputin, but before dying he reveals that the Mistletoe's Curse will destroy Yuri's memories and that Nicolai intends to release the Malice from Apoina Tower, increasing the war's barbarity. The group is too late to stop Nicolai from releasing Malice into the world as an act of defiance against Yuri. They are about to kill him when Kato intervenes, sealing Apoina Tower and leaving with both Nicolai and the Émigré Manuscript due to Japan's alliance with Russia.

In Japan, Foreign Minister Ishimura intends to use Nicolai to destabilize the West and protect Japan from its influence. Attempts to extract Astaroth give the demon full control of Nicolai's body. Yuri's group, allied with his cousin Kurando, fails to prevent Astaroth's escape due to the opposition of Kato and his cloned group of soldiers which includes Ouka. After Astaroth's escape, Kato helps Yuri's group defeat the god at its lair in Mount Fuji. The enraged Nicholai tries to kill Yuri, then attacks Kato when he intercedes; Ouka blocks the blow, dying in Kato's arms. Kato kills Nicolai, later giving Yuri the Émigré Manuscript to attempt Alice's resurrection and declaring them now enemies. The group confronts Ishimura, and when his grandson appears and Ishimura begs they spare him, Yuri flies into a rage and beats Ishimura nearly to death before breaking down in tears, having forgotten his reason for fighting. Bacon helps Yuri attempt Alice's resurrection. The ritual briefly works, with Alice assuring her love for Yuri before her new body disintegrates. Bacon deduces that Kato encouraged the ritual to use its side effect of time warping for his own ends; Kato plans to travel back in time and rewrite history, unmaking the current world.

After meeting Alice's spirit and having a final talk with Jeanne, Yuri faces Kato as he summons the magical Asuka Stone Platform to enact his plan. Kato is defeated, and before dying tells Yuri that the group must wish for their heart's desire in order to escape. As the others depart to places they can find happiness, the Mistletoe's Curse manifests, and Yuri bids Karin farewell and remains behind. Depending on his answer to a question from Jeanne, Yuri can allow the Curse to consume him and end up in Roger's care as an amnesiac; or commit suicide, reuniting with Alice's spirit before going back in time to the day they met and getting the chance to save her. The latter has been confirmed as the canon ending. Whatever Yuri's choice, Karin is sent back in time to Tokyo in 1887, there meeting Yuri's father and deciding to move on with her life; Karin uses the name "Anne", and becomes Yuri's mother.

== Development ==
Covenant was developed by Sacnoth, the same studio that had handled both Shadow Hearts and series predecessor Koudelka. During the game's development, Sacnoth was rebranded as Nautilus, with Covenant being the company's first title released under the new branding. Matsuzo Machida returned as director and writer, and Miyako Kato as character designer. The art director was Takamusa Ohsawa. Production of the game began in the autumn of 2002. For the sequel of Shadow Hearts the staff wanted to maintain the serious atmosphere from the prequel, while still containing punchlines as comic relief. This was due to feedback from players who felt the storyline and overall tone of Shadow Hearts was too dark and disturbing.

The theme of the game is "happiness", alluding to how people may find happiness in many different ways, reflected mainly in Yuri's story. Due to Yuri's popularity, the character returned for the sequel. The staff initially had the idea of bringing him back alongside Alice as a happily married couple, but ultimately believed that this did not fit the serious tone of the game. As a result, the plot begins with Alice dead, resulting in a negative response from the fans. Machida, impressed with the fans' backlash regarding Yuri not being Karin's lover due to their preference for the relationship between Yuri and Alice, answered that they should play the game. The final plot twist of Karin being Yuri's mother was not decided until Machida was writing the ending. While the more conventional route would be to have Yuri partner with Karin, he felt that went against the "pure love theme" around Yuri and Alice. He also reasoned that Yuri would not have the impetus to change the past if he accepted Karin's love.

Ohsawa reported that Machida gave his team the "impossible" task of making the 3D character models exactly match their 2D concept illustrations. As with the first game, monster designs drew inspiration from H. P. Lovecraft's Cthulhu Mythos. Incorporating real-time events into the game proved difficult for the staff, although they enjoyed the challenge it provided. Excluding Blanca, who was used for comic relief, real actors were used for all the cast's motion capture. Machida created the storyboards at the beginning of production; initially planning two and a half hours of cutscenes, it eventually extended to over four hours. The game's CGI cutscenes were produced by Avant. A focus for the developers was adjusting the camera angles during real-time scenes.

The combat system of Shadow Hearts was revamped for Covenant, in response to criticism of the first game's mechanics. The Judgment Ring was redesigned, resulting in the addition of multiple ring types and an "auto" mode. The combo system was implemented to make the game feel more rewarding for advanced players. Designer Takehiro Ishida said the reworked battle system would provide a greater sense of speed and action for players, describing its production as a challenge. Machida estimated the gameplay content as being around 40 hours, twice that of the first game. Adjustments and tuning of the mechanics went on until the end of development.

=== Music ===
The music of Covenant was composed by Yoshitaka Hirota, with additional contributions by Yasunori Mitsuda, Kenji Ito and Tomoko Kobayashi; Kobayashi's contributions were limited to story-related pieces. The three composers were asked to examine and deconstruct the sound of the original Shadow Hearts. Due to the shift in tone, Hirota made the soundtrack more dynamic and emotional without surrendering the signature Shadow Hearts sound. The final soundtrack included over sixty pieces. The previous game's main theme "Icaro" returned in arranged forms. The ending theme "Getsurenka" was written by Hirota and performed by Mio Isayama, with lyrics by Kumiko Hasegawa. A 2CD soundtrack album, Shadow Hearts II Original Soundtrack, was published by Team Entertainment on March 24, 2004.

=== Release ===
The existence of a sequel to Shadow Hearts was first revealed in early June 2003 by the Japanese video game website Quiter. It was officially announced under its official Japanese title Shadow Hearts II two weeks later. The game was released on February 19, 2004 by Aruze. It came as both a standard edition and a limited edition featuring a CD with cast interviews and artwork, and themed merchandise. A budget release "Director's Cut" was released on March 10, 2005. It included new and expanded dungeons, new story sequences, new sections where players controlled a group of the main antagonists, and a new CGI cutscene replacing the real-time cutscene of Yuri and Alice's meeting. Four guidebooks were released between February and June 2004. An authorized comic anthology was published by Studio DNA in June 2004. Other merchandise included sheet music and a perfume-themed after the main protagonist. In 2008, Aruze used Covenant as the theme for one of its slot machines.

A Western release in North America and Europe from Midway Games was announced in April 2004 as Shadow Hearts: Covenant. The game was translated into English by ZPang America, and dubbed at the studio of Intersound Post Production. The English script was written by returning translator Jeremy Blaustein, returning from Shadow Hearts. Looking back on his work, Blaustein picked out Covenant as one of his favorite projects and the one he would wish to be remembered for. He was given "a relatively free hand" when translating, and arranged for voice recording to happen at a good studio in Los Angeles. As a voice director, Blaustine brought on Richard Epcar, who was noted for his work in both anime and gaming. In addition to directing voice acting, he took some roles in Covenant. The game was released in North America on September 27, 2004. It released in Europe the following year on March 11.

== Reception ==
Reception

Aggregate score
Aggregator	Score
Metacritic	85/100 (49 reviews)

Review scores
Publication	Score
1Up.com	7/10
Eurogamer	7/10
Famitsu	32/40
Game Informer	8/10
GamePro	4.5/5
GameSpot	8.6
GameSpy	4/5
IGN	9/10
PALGN	8/10
RPGFan	93%

According to Aruze, sales in Japan had reached around 150,000 units by November 2004. A different estimate from an unnamed Nautilus program director said that it sold 120,000 units in Japan by 2005. The game was counted as a success by Aruze and cited as a factor in their gaming division earning a profit during the late 2004 period. Alongside other titles, the game was credited with a rise in sale revenues for Midway Games during the 2004-2005 fiscal year. Sales in North America were similar to that of the Japanese version by 2005 according to Nautilus.

Japanese gaming magazine Famitsu recommended the game to players who enjoyed dark settings and characters. Jeremy Parish, writing for 1UP.com, praised the narrative for its contemporary setting and open association with real-life political and religious organisations. Eurogamer's Rob Fahey criticised the increasing complexity of the plot and need for players to know the original game's story. GamePro focused on the game's comedic elements, which it praised as having translated well from Japanese to English. Bethany Massimilla of GameSpot lauded the blend of serious narrative, mystical elements, and different types of comedy. GameSpy's Steve Steinberg was also positive, warning that those looking for a serious narrative might be turned off by the humour, and also noting some pacing issues. Jeremy Dunham, writing for IGN, praised both the wider narrative and how the characters were written. PALGN's Mark Marrow said that Covenant "produces one of the finest available [stories]" in RPGs. Patrick Gann of RPGFan was positive overall, praising the game's alternate history setting.

Lisa Mason of Game Informer referred to the graphics as "jaggy, but really nicely detailed", sentiments echoed by GamePro. Massimilla called the blend of background art, in-game graphics and CGI cutscenes "very easy on the eye". Dunham cited the general presentation as a step up from that of Shadow Hearts despite console-specific graphical faults. Marrow had similar comments to Dunham, saying the game was "extremely fulfilling and very nice on the eyes." Gann generally lauded the game's graphics as a significant improvement over Shadow Hearts, and praise the character designs. The soundtrack met with general praise, although some felt it was inferior to the first game. Reactions to the English voice work were mixed; some praised it, while others felt it lacked polish.

Famitsu lauded the game's "unique and detailed" battle system, and expanded breadth compared to the first Shadow Hearts. While Parish found the battle system enjoyable, he noted an archaic structure that was at odds with many other RPGs of the time and a sense of the developers including a little of anything to catch attention, which could potentially hold the game back from mainstream appeal. Fahay found the turn-based mechanics refreshing after recent action-oriented titles like Star Ocean: Till the End of Time, and praised the Judgment Ring mechanics despite it feeling old-fashioned compared to the similar turn-based system of Final Fantasy X. Mason again praised the Judgment Ring and combo system, saying they made up for the slow character progression system. GamePro was generally enthusiastic about the gameplay, and Massimilla lauded the various mechanics for the need for player engagement compared to other similar battle systems. Steinberg called Covenant "a nifty twist on the traditional RPG" due to its unconventional battle mechanics. Dunham again called the system superior to the first game, giving praise to the battles and wider customization options available to players. Marrow once more shared these sentiments, saying that players would be pleasantly lost in the breadth of content available beyond the main story. Gann praised the battle mechanics, and enjoyed the game's level scaling system.

Covenant won the 2004 NAVGTR Award for "Costume Design" and nominated for "Sequel RPG Game of the Year". In RPGamer's 2004 staff awards, Covenant won in both the "Best PlayStation 2" and "Best Overall" categories. It was also IGN's RPG Vault PS2 Game of the Year, IGN PS2's The Best of 2004 Editors' Choice Awards for Best PlayStation 2 RPG Game, and Editors' Choice Awards for Best PlayStation 2 Game That No One Played. RPGFan staff, in an episode of their retrospective series "Retro Encounter", fondly remembered Covenant as one of the best RPGs they had played in 2004, despite some aspects not aging well over the years. In the years following its release, websites including IGN, GamesRadar, PlayStation Lifestyle Game Informer, and Polygon ranked it as either one of the best RPGs or one of the best games of all time. GameTrailers called Covenant "the greatest JRPG that no-one talks about" due to its unconventional tone and battle system.

== Sequel ==
According to Machida, plans were made for a Shadow Hearts III which would have continued Yuri's story, but these never materialised. A third game in the series, Shadow Hearts: From the New World, was produced by Nautilus. Many team members returned, and the game's production was completed in a very short time. Released in Japan in Aruze in 2005, it was published in by Xseed Games in North America the following year, and in Europe by Ghostlight in 2007. From The New World was the last game produced by Nautilus before their 2007 absorption into Aruze, when they ceased console game development.
