= Saint Seiya: Sanctuary Battle =

2011 video game

- European cover art
- Developer: Dimps
- Publisher: Namco Bandai Games (Note: Released under the Bandai brand)
- Composer: Yoshitaka Hirota
- Series: Saint Seiya
- Platform: PlayStation 3
- Release: JP: November 23, 2011; AU: March 15, 2012; EU: March 16, 2012; BR: May 18, 2012
- Genres: Beat'em up, action-adventure
- Modes: Single-player, multiplayer

Saint Seiya: Sanctuary Battle, known in Japan as Saint Seiya Senki (聖闘士星矢(セイントセイヤ)戦記), is a video game developed by Dimps and published by Namco Bandai Games for the PlayStation 3, inspired by the characters appearing in Masami Kurumada's Saint Seiya manga and its anime adaptation. The game was released in November 2011 in Japan, followed by a PAL region release in March 2012. The game is inspired by the first season of the original anime, the Sanctuary Battle, in which Seiya and his friends have the task of fighting the 12 Gold Saints to save Saori Kido from dying.

== Reception ==
Reception

Aggregate score
Aggregator	Score
Metacritic	62/100

Review scores
Publication	Score
Famitsu	32/40
GamesMaster	71%
Hyper	6/10
PlayStation Official Magazine – Australia	5/10
PlayStation Official Magazine – UK	5/10
Play	52%

The game received "mixed" reviews according to the review aggregation website Metacritic. In Japan, Famitsu gave it a score of all four eights for a total of 32 out of 40.
