= Yoshitaka Hirota =

- Born: September 1, 1971 (age 54); Kyoto, Japan
- Genres: hard rock, heavy metal
- Occupations: Composer; musician
- Instrument: Bass guitar
- Years active: 1994–present
- Labels: Dog Ear Records

Yoshitaka Hirota (弘田佳孝, Hirota Yoshitaka; born September 1, 1971) is a Japanese video game composer and bass guitarist, whose most notable works include the soundtracks to the Shadow Hearts series. Hirota was previously a sound effects programmer having worked on various Square titles. His first work as a video game composer was for the 1999 Nintendo 64 game Bomberman 64: The Second Attack.

== Biography ==
=== Early works ===
As a teenager, Hirota's older brother would play covers of The Beatles and The Carpenters. Hirota composed his first song at the age of ten. At the age of 20, unsure of his career path, Hirota was invited by composer Yasunori Mitsuda to work at Square, and was hired as a sound designer.

=== Square ===
Hirota has a friendship from childhood with fellow composer Yasunori Mitsuda who he has worked with on Bomberman 64: The Second Attack, Biohazard 2 Drama Albums, Shadow Hearts and Shadow Hearts II. Under the direction of Mitsuda, Street Fighter Alpha 3 was to have a "hard" sound, and Biohazard 2 was to have an "ominous sound".

=== Shadow Hearts ===
Kyoko Kishikawa has worked with Hirota on Shadow Hearts, Shadow Hearts II (although not Shadow Hearts: From the New World) and Rogue Galaxy Premium Arrange, providing eerie female scat vocals for a number of his tracks. Ryo Fukuda has been the sound manipulator for Hirota on the Shadow Hearts games as well as composing and arranging a few tracks for all three games. He also co-composed with Hirota on Sonic Shuffle. Kenji Ito worked with Hirota on the soundtrack of Shadow Hearts II.

=== Live performance ===
Hirota has performed bass guitar for Ito's live performance of Culdcept music during the Extra Live Concert. and for Ito's vocal song for Lux-Pain, Hirota frequently performs bass guitar with Kishikawa's band. He is currently a member of Nobuo Uematsu's band, the Earthbound Papas.

=== Musical style and influences ===
Hirota's Shadow Hearts music is notable for its fusion of cultural music with Hirota's personal Industrial style. Although Hirota is primarily a bass guitarist, he is capable of playing a variety of other instruments: the Biwa, the Syami, the Alter Ego Figaro, the Saw Wo, the Son, the Khene, the Old Drum, the Madaru, the Gong, the Suzu, and the Kalimba.

== Works ==
=== Video games ===
Composition

Title	Year	Notes
Bomberman 64: The Second Attack	1999	With Tomohiko Kira, Yasunori Mitsuda, Hidenobu Otsuki, Tomori Kudo, Hiroyo Yamanaka, and Kenji Hiramatsu
Dive Alert	1999	
Faselei!	1999	
Sonic Shuffle	2000	With Hidenobu Otsuki, Ryo Fukuda, Takeo Suzuki, and Kazumi Mitome
Shadow Hearts	2001	With Yasunori Mitsuda, Masaharu Iwata, and Ryo Fukuda
Shadow Hearts: Covenant	2004	With Yasunori Mitsuda, Kenji Ito, Ryo Fukuda, and Tomoko Kobayashi
Shadow Hearts: From the New World	2005	With Tomoko Imoto, Ryo Fukuda, and Hirotomi Imoto
Fist Groove 2	2006	
Saint Seiya: Meiou Hades Juunikyuu Hen	2007	
Hana Saku DS Gardening Life	2007	
DK: Jungle Climber	2007	With Yuichi Kanno and Takashi Kouga
Start Yoga with Tipness on your DS	2007	
Maji de Manabu: LEC de Ukaru	2008	
Glory of Heracles	2008	With Yuichi Kanno
D.Gray-Man Sousya no Shigaku	2008	
Klonoa	2008	
Half-Minute Hero: The Second Coming	2011	With various others
Saint Seiya: Sanctuary Battle	2011	
Super Monkey Ball: Banana Splitz	2012	With Saori Kobayashi
UnchainBlades EXXIV	2012	With Tsutomu Narita, Nobuo Uematsu, and Michio Okamiya
Kakuriyo no Mon	2015	Only composed "其れでも先へ進む")
Egglia: Legend of the Red Cap	2017	With Yoko Shimomura

Sound design

Title	Year
Final Fantasy VI	1994
Live A Live	1994
Chrono Trigger	1995
Seiken Densetsu 3	1995
Bahamut Lagoon	1996
Final Fantasy VII	1997
Front Mission 2	1997
Parasite Eve	1998
Chrono Cross	1999
Koudelka	1999

=== Other works ===
Title	Year	Notes
Talk While Asleep	1995	Co-remixer with Fumiya Tanaka
We are not alone ~Mou Hitori Ja Nai~	1998	Co-composer with Kazumi Mitome
Biohazard 2 Drama Album: Chiisana Toubousha Sherry	1999	Co-Composer with Yasunori Mitsuda
Biohazard 2 Drama Album: Ikiteita Onna Spy Ada	1999	Co-Composer with Yasunori Mitsuda
Street Fighter Zero 3 Drama Album	1999	Co-Composer with Yasunori Mitsuda
near death experience, SHADOW HEARTS	2005	Arranger of 5 Tracks
Angelic Vale	2005	Arranger of 2 Tracks
Tsuki no Uta	2005	Debut Single of Saki Imozuki. Arranger of all tracks
Yoruoto Hyouhon	2005	Debut Album of Noriko Mitose. Composer and arranger of 1 Track
Rogue Galaxy	2006	Arranger of 1 Track
Kinema in the Hall	2007	Rekka Katakiri Album. Composer and arranger of all tracks
Cotton	2007	Noriko Mitose Album. Arranger of 1 Track
Hareyaka naru Sora no Yukue	2007	Rekka Katakiri Album. Composer and Arranger of 1 Track
Struldbruggs ~Majin Kaikou~	2007	Co-Composer
Istoria ~Musa~	2007	Akiko Shikata album. Composer and Arranger of 1 Track
Umineko no Naku Koro ni	2008	Akiko Shikata Single, Arranger of 1 Track
"message"	2008	Collaboration Album - Composer and Arranger of 1 Track
Griotte no Nemuri Hime	2009	Haruka Shimotsuki Album
SUZUNO=MIYA Ar tonelico III hymmnos concert side. Red	2010	Composer and Arranger of 2 Tracks
Guwange	2010	Arranger of 1 Track
yorlga	2010	Noriko Mitose album, Composer and Arranger of all tracks
