= Koudelka =

1999 role-playing video game

- European cover art, featuring main protagonist Koudelka.
- Developer: Sacnoth
- Publishers: JP: SNK; WW: Infogrames
- Director: Hiroki Kikuta
- Producer: Hiroki Kikuta
- Programmer: Satoru Yoshieda
- Artists: Yūji Iwahara; Matsuzo Machida
- Writer: Hiroki Kikuta
- Composer: Hiroki Kikuta
- Series: Shadow Hearts
- Platform: PlayStation
- Release: JP: December 16, 1999; NA: June 29, 2000; PAL: September 27, 2000
- Genre: Role-playing
- Mode: Single-player

Koudelka (Japanese: クーデルカ, Hepburn: Kūderuka) is a role-playing video game developed by Sacnoth for the PlayStation. The game was published by SNK in Japan in 1999, and by Infogrames internationally in 2000. Set in the haunted Nemeton Monastery in Wales, the plot follows protagonists Koudelka Iasant, Edward Plunkett and Bishop James O'Flaherty as they uncover Nemeton's secrets and confront monsters created from its dark past. Its gameplay blends exploration and puzzle elements with turn-based battles waged on a grid.

Koudelka was created by Hiroki Kikuta, a former employee of Square who formed Sacnoth with other Square staff members in 1997 to develop the game. Kikuta was its director, producer, writer and composer. The staff travelled to Wales for research, and all dialogue was spoken in English. The traditional turn-based battle system was created without Kikuta's involvement, due to staff disputes. The game, which saw moderate commercial success in Japan and received mixed reviews from critics worldwide, was the foundation of Sacnoth's Shadow Hearts series.

== Gameplay ==
The main protagonist, Koudelka, in the game's opening battle.

Koudelka is a role-playing video game (RPG) set in the fictional Nemeton Mansion. Controlling Koudelka Iasant, the main protagonist, the player explores Nemeton. Gameplay is divided between event scenes, in which story sequences play; exploration, incorporating puzzle-solving; and a battle screen where players fight monsters spawned in Nemeton. Exploration is similar to the early Resident Evil games; Koudelka—rendered as a 3D character model—explores environments created with pre-rendered backgrounds shown through fixed camera angles. Items and weapons are found in the environment or gained after a battle, with the number of items which can be carried limited.

Combat is triggered through random encounters, with battles governed by a turn-based system. The three playable characters and the enemy are positioned on a grid, able to move to a new square and perform an action with each turn. Each party has access to physical and magical attacks and other abilities, such as status effects, healing magic and the ability to escape from battle. Each player character can equip any of a variety of weapons, which break after being used a number of times. At the end of each successful battle, the party gains experience points (raising their experience level) and ability points (to increase attributes, such as agility and speed). Depending on usage, weapons and abilities increase in power as their skill level rises with use.

== Synopsis ==
In 1898, near Aberystwyth, Wales, Romani psychic Koudelka Iasant is drawn by a mysterious voice to the isolated Nemeton. A former medieval monastery, Nemeton was converted into a mansion and is now infested with monsters. Koudelka breaks into Nemeton, losing her magic pendant in the process, and saves wayward adventurer Edward Plunkett from a monster attack. They are offered hospitality by the mansion's caretakers, Ogden and Bessy Hartman. Their food is poisoned, and Koudelka—having detected the poison and refused to eat—cures Edward. Exploring Nemeton, they meet Catholic bishop James O'Flaherty; James refuses to believe that the Hartmans are responsible for the deaths, since they did not try to poison him. They also encounter the ghost of Charlotte D'lota, a young girl who was executed in Nemeton, and are attacked by an intruder named Alias. From visions, human remains and confiscated artefacts, Koudelka learns that Nemeton was a prison for dissidents that now haunt the mansion.

They learn from Alias that he survived the Hartmans' attempt to kill him and the mansion's monsters, and saw the Hartmans kill anyone who trespassed in the mansion. Admitting that he tried to kill them to keep Nemeton's treasures for himself, Edward kills Alias because he is a threat. Koudelka discovers a room full of paintings of the destroyed SS Princess Alice and has a vision of Elaine Heyworth, wife of Nemeton's current owner Patrick. The group finds the apparently-dead Roger Bacon, who briefly revives and mentions the Émigré Document, in the library. James says that he was sent by the Vatican to recover the Émigré Document, a book of Celtic rituals to gain immortality and revive the dead. James was asked by the Hartmans to save Patrick, who stole the Émigré Document. Koudelka is separated from the group when a monster attacks them, and finds the room where Ogden killed his victims. Ogden captures her and rants about his guilt for the Princess Alice disaster, but Bessy shoots him before he can kill Koudelka. Before shooting herself, Bessy explains that Ogden killed intruders to avenge Elaine, who was killed by a thief.

After meeting Bacon and rejoining the others, Koudelka decides that something else was driving the Hartmans and spawning the monsters. James says that he and Patrick courted Elaine, but James' social background prevented a marriage and he joined the church to ease his pain. Confronted by Charlotte, Koudelka can use letters written by Charlotte's mother to let her pass on. The group rejoins Bacon, who achieved imperfect immortality after learning the Émigré Document's secrets while copying it for the Vatican. Koudelka summons Elaine's spirit, and they learn that Patrick and Ogden used the Émigré Document to resurrect Elaine; they resurrected her body as a monster, which caused the events at the mansion. Elaine—who summoned Koudelka to aid her—asks them to destroy her body so her spirit can be free. Bacon tells the group how to do this, in a section of Nemeton which has been converted into a temple.

The three enter the temple and find Patrick's body. James destroys the temple, starting a fire which begins consuming the building. Depending on the player's actions, three different endings are unlocked. If Koudelka does not regain her pendant, they are killed when they confront Elaine and the game is over. If she finds the pendant, Koudelka uses it to block Elaine's attack and they are cornered in the mansion's bell tower. If the party defeats Elaine, they contemplate the situation as the sun rises over the ruined mansion. If Elaine defeats them, James sacrifices himself to destroy Elaine, and Koudelka and Edward escape the collapsing tower. After spending the night together they part, although Koudelka believes that they will meet again.

== Development ==
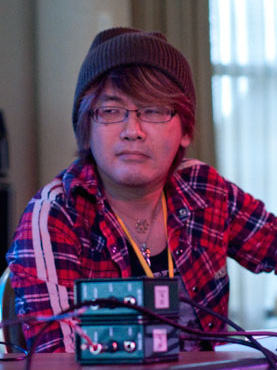
Hiroki Kikuta (pictured in 2011) was heavily involved in the game's development, acting as producer, director, writer and composer.

Koudelka was created by Hiroki Kikuta, who composed the music for Secret of Mana, Seiken Densetsu 3 and Soukaigi at Square. Kikuta wanted to direct his own game, but Square's corporate structure prevented him from moving beyond a composer. Searching for a way to expand his role, Kikuta was introduced to the chairman of SNK; during their talk, he outlined many perceived pitfalls in the role-playing genre. Leaving Square, he formed Sacnoth in 1997 with other Square employees and SNK's funding. As Sacnoth's CEO and the game's main creative lead, Kikuta wanted to create a horror RPG. Koudelka began development after Sacnoth was founded, and Kikuta was its producer, director, writer and composer.

Although Koudelka used turn-based combat on a grid and random encounters (similar to traditional RPGs), this was not Kikuta's original intention. He originally planned a real-time battle system with free movement within the environment, combining mechanics from simulation and adventure games. Interactive environments, such as furniture, were also planned to play a part in combat. Kikuta wanted to break away from RPG conventions, but other Sacnoth staff were reluctant to follow his example and retained traditional ideas from Square. Kikuta later regretted his lack of direct influence on the game design. About the battle-system design, art director Matsuzo Machida (credited as Matsuzo Itakura) said that it was designed to be easy so adults who did not normally play games could see the game's ending; in hindsight, the team could have increased the challenge.

To create an authentic atmosphere, Kikuta used advanced motion capture technology to give realistic physical mannerisms to the character models during real-time cutscenes. Kikuta's decision to use motion capture, which he called "epoch-making", was part of his attempt to move away from RPG conventions by adding drama. The story required the capture of up to four people in each scene, impossible with technology available in Japan. Through the original staff of Soukaigi, Kikuta contacted Santa Monica-based special-effects company FutureLight. Intrigued by Kikuta's concept, FutureLight agreed to help record the cutscenes. In a later interview, he said that the techniques used for the motion-capture sessions were on a par with those used by Hollywood studios at the time. The CGI cutscenes were created by Digital Media Lab. The motion-capture sessions took place in January 1998 at FutureLight's local studios. The motion capture and animation processes were handled by FutureLight and Sacnoth staff, with Kikuta the sessions' executive producer. Rehearsals, supervised by Kikuta, were held in a nearby hotel. The recording sessions were in a converted sound studio; since the studio was not fully soundproofed, recording was sometimes halted due to exterior noises. Equipment around the soundstage was used as props for the actors, so the in-game immersion would not be broken.

=== Scenario and art design ===
According to Kikuta, his research for the narrative and the basic elements of Koudelka took three months; the one-night timescale and singular location were due to the game's limited staff and development time. Aberystwyth was chosen because he wanted a location across the sea from Ireland. Due to a lack of Japanese resources on British architecture, Kikuta and several staff members made a research trip to Pembrokeshire to see local scenery and church architecture. The region's coastal cliffs, ancient ruins and weather conditions influenced Koudelka's setting and design. Kikuta's choice of 1898 was influenced by his wish for a story blending realism and fantasy; the end of the 19th century symbolised, to him, the intermingling of superstition and the next century's technological advances. Kikuta wanted to explore the uneasy coexistence of magic and science in the game. He bought over 100 books on British history during his research, from the medieval to the Victorian eras. His inspirations for the story included Umberto Eco's The Name of the Rose (and its film adaptation), William Hope Hodgson's Carnacki, the Ghost-Finder, H. P. Lovecraft's The Case of Charles Dexter Ward and novels by Lord Dunsany. Koudelka's setting and story were primarily inspired by Carnacki, the Ghost-Finder. Kikuta incorporated a number of historical events and figures, including the sinking of the Princess Alice and fictionalized versions of Lord Dunsany and Roger Bacon. Charlotte's mother was based on Sophia Dorothea of Celle. The story's tone was influenced by the history and folklore of Wales.

Its characters were designed by Yūji Iwahara, who created over 100 character sketches for the game. The visuals were inspired by the work of Bob Carlos Clarke, Jan Saudek and Holly Warburton. Koudelka was among the first elements of the game created by Kikuta, with Iwahara's first character drafts created in March 1998. Koudelka's given name was taken from photographer Josef Koudelka; Kikuta liked its mysterious sound and lack of any specific ethnic origin. Kikuta's wish for a lonely character resulted in Koudelka's background as an exiled gypsy. Her design required several redrafts to be carried over into the game, which had severe polygon and memory restrictions. Machida's design of Nemeton was intended to compress the variety of a typical RPG world map into a limited exploration space and permit detailed backgrounds within the console's hardware limitations. Nemeton used a blend of architectural styles, with elements ranging from its origins as a Gothic monastery (inspired by St Davids) to contemporary additions. Koudelka's CGI model was created by Sacnoth and a company founded by artist Nobuji Watanabe, whom Kikuta chose for his passion for good work. The model went through multiple redrafts, with Kikuta making adjustments.

In creating Koudelka's storyline, Kikuta conceived a potential four-part series following her family through the 20th century with events and themes from the original clash of science and magic. In the first sequel, Koudelka would attend the 1900 Exposition Universelle; the second would move to Chicago in 1973 during the late Vietnam War and follow Koudelka's grandson, Rodmell, through an urban fantasy scenario. In the third, Rodmell would travel to Kyoto in 1984, where magic and modern life were still closely connected. Some backstory elements relating to Koudelka were created by Kikuta, such as her meeting a young Jack the Ripper, but not included in the game.

=== Audio ===
Kikuta found composing the score the easiest part of development, since he primarily worked on his own. His concept for Koudelka's musical elements were created with the setting and narrative. The score was arranged by Kikuta and Nick Ingman. To compose most of the game's tracks, Kikuta used Atari Notator sound software. While he found lack of compression an issue, the better sequencing software was useful in creating the score for the CGI cutscenes. With less music than the average RPG, the score was completed within six months. Instead of the looping tracks of Kikuta's work with Square, Koudelka used ambient sounds and short tracks related to cutscenes outside battle themes, and featured influences from church music. Its opening theme "Requiem" was performed by Catherine Bott. The ending theme "Ubi Caritas et amor"—taken from a larger composition by Maurice Duruflé—was performed by the London Oratory School.

A CD soundtrack album was released in December 1999 by Pony Canyon and Scitron Digital Contents, with over an hour of music and 34 tracks. The album, which included all tracks from the game and live versions of three battle themes (arranged by Naoya Akimoto), received generally-positive reviews from music critics. Its music was praised and criticized by reviewers of the game.

The game had English voice work for all characters, with Japan using native subtitles rather than a Japanese dub. The game's cast provided motion capture and character voices. They were chosen from 100 actors who auditioned for the roles, including the twelve-year-old Sara Paxton as Charlotte. Vivianna Bateman, who played Koudelka, was chosen to give her character a cool, "unique" air. Kikuta called Edward's actor, Mickaël Bradberry, the "mood maker" for recording. The rest of the cast included Gavin Carlton (Ogden), Denise White (Bessy), Scott Larson (James), Rob Brownstein (Alias), Kim Weild (Elaine), Keith Barry (Patrick), and Brian Kojac (Bacon).

== Release ==
Koudelka and its publisher, SNK, were first announced in September 1999. As part of its marketing campaign, a music CD and promotional poster were offered as pre-order bonuses. The game was released in Japan on December 16, 1999, and was scheduled for a Western release by Electronic Arts. It was later announced that Infogrames would publish the title in North America and Europe. It was released overseas in 2000: on June 29 in North America, and September 27 in Europe. In addition to the PlayStation version, Sacnoth were reportedly developing a version for the Neo Geo Pocket Color. Console Classics announced plans in 2015 to port Koudelka to Microsoft Windows via Steam, but nothing further has been announced.

=== Adaptations ===
The first volume of a three-volume manga adaptation originally serialized in Ace Next, written and illustrated by Iwahara, was published in November 1999 by Kadokawa Shoten; the third volume was published in September 2000. The manga was intended to tie into Kikuta's planned sequel and is set after the game. A novelization, Koudelka - The Mansion's Scream by Nahoko Korekata, was published by ASCII Media Works in February 2000 as part of its Famitsu Bunko imprint. An audio drama based on the game, with Japanese actors and excerpts from its score, was released in November 1999 by Scitron Digital Contents.

== Reception ==
Reception

Aggregate score
Aggregator	Score
GameRankings	60%

Review scores
Publication	Score
Electronic Gaming Monthly	6/10
Famitsu	28/40
GamePro	3/5
GameSpot	6.7/10
IGN	6.8/10
Next Generation	3/5
Power Unlimited	6/10
RPGamer	7/10
RPGFan	60%

While no sales figures were reported, Koudelka was said to have been "moderately successful" in Japan. The title was not mentioned by Infogrames during its financial report at the end of the 2000-2001 fiscal year.

The Japanese gaming magazine Famitsu compared Koudelka's atmosphere to Western horror films. The dark atmosphere was one of the points of praise for Electronic Gaming Monthly. GameSpot's Ike Sato called the story "quite entertaining", and David Zdyrko of IGN enjoyed its cinematic tone. RPGamer's Jake Alley praised the game's tone, presentation and localization. According to Ken Chu of RPGFan, the story "fails to inspire more than a passing interest" despite its strong characters and unconventional use of horror. Eric Bratcher of Next Generation cited its atmosphere as a strong point in its narrative.

GamePro found the turn-based battles too slow for enjoyment, a sentiment echoed by the Dutch magazine Power Unlimited. A GamePro reviewer could not follow the game's story, an issue magnified by its slow pace. Electronic Gaming Monthly faulted the weapon durability system, random encounters, and inconsistent difficulty as issues with the game. Sato was generally disappointed by difficulty and balance issues. Zdyrko faulted several mechanics, such as saving and equipment limitations. Alley found the mixture of gameplay styles strange, faulted the game's weapons limitations and praised its innovative take on RPG mechanics. Chu criticized the gameplay, finding several aspects unbalanced or poorly designed. Bratcher called the battles a "welcome change" from standard exploration, but found several other gameplay elements poorly implemented. The game's slow pace was a recurring complaint by reviewers.

Although Famitsu praised Koudelka's CGI movies and art design, one of its reviewers found some areas too dark to navigate easily. GamePro lauded the game's environment and character design, and Sato enjoyed its CGI cutscenes and real-time graphics. Zdyrko praised the graphics (despite their dark tone), and Alley called them "wonderful". Chu disliked the in-game graphics, but enjoyed the CGI segments; Both Electronic Gaming Monthly and Power Unlimited also praised the cutscenes. Bratcher cited a lack of atmosphere in general navigation as a negative, alongside the characters' voices not matching their models despite decent quality.

== Legacy ==
Sacnoth is one of a group of video-game companies—with Monolith Soft, Love-de-Lic and Mistwalker—founded by Square staff who had worked on notable titles produced during the 1990s. After Koudelka's release, Kikuta resigned as the company's CEO and founded a music label; his planned sequels, continuing the story of Koudelka's family, were never produced.

Sacnoth would go on to develop Shadow Hearts, a role-playing game for the PlayStation 2 and the first instalment of the Shadow Hearts series. Shadow Hearts is set in the same reality as Koudelka, taking place after the bad ending of the latter. Sacnoth produced two more Shadow Hearts titles (Covenant and From the New World) before it was merged into company owner Aruze in 2007 and ceased video game production. Iwahara's work on the game and its manga adaptation influenced anime director Tensai Okamura into hiring him for the anime series Darker than Black.
