= Sacnoth =

Japanese video game developer

Aruze Global Trading Corporation
- The original Sacnoth logo
- Native name: アルゼグローバルトレーディング株式会社
- Romanized name: Aruze Gurōbaru Torēdingu Kabushiki gaisha
- Formerly: Sacnoth (1997–2002); Nautilus (2002–2007)
- Type: Subsidiary
- Industry: Video games
- Founded: 30 April 1997; 29 years ago
- Founder: Hiroki Kikuta
- Defunct: 1 February 2009; 17 years ago
- Fate: Merged into Aruze Marketing Japan
- Headquarters: Tokyo, Japan
- Key people: Hiroki Kikuta (CEO, 1997–1999); Matsuzo Machida (game director)
- Products: Shadow Hearts
- Parent: Aruze (2002–2009)

Sacnoth Inc., (Note: Japanese: 株式会社サクノス, Hepburn: Kabushiki gaisha Sakunosu) renamed Nautilus Inc. (Note: Japanese: ノーチラス株式会社, Hepburn: Nōchirasu Kabushiki gaisha) in 2002, was a Japanese video game developer based in Tokyo. The company was founded in April 1997 by Hiroki Kikuta with funding from SNK; its staff, including Kikuta, were veterans of Square. While their first releases were the Dive Alert games for the Neo Geo Pocket Color (NGPC), the company was founded to produce Koudelka, a role-playing video game for the PlayStation. The development of Koudelka was troubled due to creative differences between Kikuta and the rest of the staff, with Kikuta resigning as CEO following the game's release and being replaced by Jun Mihara. The company also released the NGPC game Faselei!.

Following Koudelka, the company went on to develop the first game in the Shadow Hearts series. In 2002, Aruze acquired Sacnoth and renamed it to Nautilus. Under that name, the company developed two more Shadow Hearts games. As part of a larger reorganization within Aruze, Nautilus was renamed Aruze Global Trading Corporation (Note: Japanese: アルゼグローバルトレーディング株式会社, Hepburn: Aruze Gurōbaru Torēdingu Kabushiki gaisha) and exited the video game business in September 2007 before being absorbed into another Aruze subsidiary in February 2009. The work of Sacnoth for the NGPC has been mentioned positively in articles on the console, while the Shadow Hearts series retains a cult status and is remembered for its setting and gameplay. Multiple former employees joined Feelplus.

== History ==
=== 1997–2000: First games, Koudelka ===
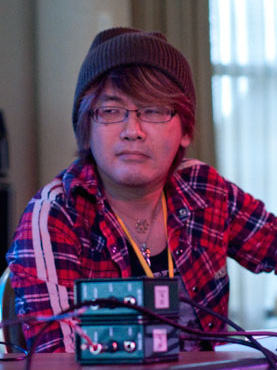
Hiroki Kikuta founded Sacnoth in 1997.

Sacnoth was founded by Hiroki Kikuta, a former composer for Square who worked on Secret of Mana, Trials of Mana and Soukaigi. While at Square, Kikuta wanted to direct his own game but, due to the strict hierarchical structure at the company, could not move beyond his role as a composer. Searching for a means of expanding his role, he was introduced by a business advisor to the chairman of SNK. During their talk, Kikuta outlined many perceived pitfalls he saw emerging in the role-playing game (RPG) genre. The company was founded on 30 April 1997, with Kikuta as its CEO. While SNK provided funding for the company, it had little involvement in its products and creative direction, with SNK's Norimasa Hirano describing Sacnoth as an independent developer. Sacnoth's headquarters were based in Tokyo.

Sacnoth developed their first two projects in parallel: Koudelka for the PlayStation, and the Dive Alert duology for the NGPC. The Dive Alert games were their first releases in Japan and were promoted as part of the portable's early line-up. It was also one of the last NGPC games released in North America. Koudelka was born from Kikuta's wish to create a "horror RPG", beginning development of the title following the company's foundation. Kikuta acted as the game's director, producer, writer and composer. His original plan for the gameplay and combat was to combine mechanics from simulation and adventure games, breaking away from RPG trends. The rest of the staff were reluctant to do this, and they instead created a traditional turn-based battle system without his involvement.

Kikuta resigned as Sacnoth's CEO following the release of Koudelka in 1999, later founding the music label Norstrilia. Kikuta was replaced as CEO by Jun Mihara. The last game developed by Sacnoth under SNK was Faselei!, a tactical RPG released in 1999 for the NGPC. During this period, SNK ran into financial troubles and was bought out by Aruze in January 2000. Faselei! was one of the last games produced for the NGPC, as Aruze pulled the console from sale in June 2000.

=== 2001–2009: Shadow Hearts ===
Following Koudelka, Shadow Hearts began development for the PlayStation 2, directed and written by Koudelka art director Matsuzo Machida (credited as Matsuzo Itakura). Mihara acted as the game's producer. Using the setting of Koudelka, Machida created a traditional RPG that blended Lovecraftian horror with alternative history. Released in 2001, Shadow Hearts was the first RPG published by Aruze. Shadow Hearts was the last game developed by Sacnoth under that name.

In November 2002, Sacnoth was acquired by Aruze and renamed Nautilus, carrying over its original staff. The responsibilities of Nautilus were divided between developing further Shadow Hearts titles and supporting the production of Aruze's pachinko machines. The company's first title under the Nautilus name was Shadow Hearts: Covenant, a sequel to Shadow Hearts featuring many of the same staff. Using feedback from the first Shadow Hearts, Machida added more comedic elements. Covenant was released in Japan in 2004. The team also created a director's cut of the game.

After the release of Covenant, Shadow Hearts: From the New World entered into production. The game was completed on a very tight schedule and focused on refining the battle system of Covenant instead of adding new elements. From the New World is a spin-off featuring new characters to reach a wider audience. The game was released in Japan in 2005, coming to Western countries through third-party publishers over the next two years. Plans to continue the Shadow Hearts series were never realized.

By February 2007, Nautilus had become absent from Aruze's financial statements, prompting rumours that the company had been dissolved. The studio was renamed Aruze Global Trading on 21 September 2007, during large-scale structural changes within Aruze. Under its new name, Aruze Global Trading was not involved in game development. The company was merged into another Aruze subsidiary, Aruze Marketing Japan, on 1 February 2009. Aruze Marketing Japan was itself merged into Aruze in June of that year. Several of Sacnoth's staff eventually joined Feelplus, which helped develop games like Lost Odyssey and Ninety-Nine Nights II.

=== Legacy ===
Sacnoth is noted as being one of a group of video game companies—alongside Monolith Soft, Love-de-Lic and Mistwalker—founded by Square staff who had worked on notable titles produced during the 1990s. Writing in a feature for Anime News Network, Todd Ciolek noted the positive responses to the studio's work on Shadow Hearts, though felt Koudelka was inferior compared to their other work. In an article on the NGPC for USgamer, Jeremy Parish noted Sacnoth as one of the best developers to work with the console due to their work on Dive Alert and Faselei!. Faselei! has been remembered or ranked as one of the best NGPC games of all time, and become a collector's item. The Shadow Hearts series has also seen a positive reception over time and maintained a cult following, with many noting its gameplay design and combination of alternate history and Lovecraftian horror in its setting.

== Games developed ==
Year	Title	Platform(s)	Notes
1999	Dive Alert	Neo Geo Pocket Color	Released in two editions: Becky's Version and Matt's Version
1999	Koudelka	PlayStation	
1999	Faselei!	Neo Geo Pocket Color	
2001	Shadow Hearts	PlayStation 2	Last game developed under the "Sacnoth" title
2004	Shadow Hearts: Covenant	PlayStation 2	
2005	Shadow Hearts: From the New World	PlayStation 2	
