= Scitron Digital Contents =

Japanese record label

Scitron Digital Contents, Inc.
- Native name: サイトロン・デジタルコンテンツ株式会社
- Romanized name: Saitoron Dejitaru Kontentsu Kabushiki gaisha
- Type: KK
- Industry: record label
- Founded: 2001; Japan
- Headquarters: Japan
- Products: List of video game albums released
- Website: Official site (in Japanese)

Scitron Digital Contents, Inc. (サイトロン・デジタルコンテンツ株式会社, Saitoron Dejitaru Kontentsu Kabushiki gaisha) is a Japanese record label that publishes video game music albums.

== List of video game albums released ==
A - B - C - D - E - F - G - H - I - J - K - L - M - N - O - P - Q - R - S - T - U - V - W - X - Y - Z

== # ==
- 3LDK ~Shiawase ni Narou yo~ Original Music Countdown SCDC-00373

== A ==
- ACECOMBAT 04 shattered skies Original Soundtrack SCDC-00146
- Advance Guardian Heroes Original Soundtrack SCDC-00371
- After... Complete Vocal Collection SCDC-00326
- AGNOIA Drama CD Phrase2 SCDC-00054
- Anata ni Todoke! In Aki (Autumn) SCDC-00049
- Anata ni todoke! In Fuyu / Mayuko Omimura SCDC-00008
- Anata ni todoke! In Haru / Mayuko Omimura SCDC-00012
- Anata ni todoke! In Natsu SCDC-00031
- Anata to issho - Yuki (Snow) SCDC-00057
- Anata to Issho Hana SCDC-00078
- Anata to issho Sora SCDC-00133
- Ashita wa hareru SCDC-00065

== B ==
- Backlash Drama CD SCDC-00380
- Bakusou Dekotora Legend Original Soundtrack SCDC-00400
- Barashi SCDC-00105
- Berwick Saga ~Lazberia chronicle chapter 174~ Soundtrack SCDC-00457/9
- Birthday Disc "Virgo" (Otome-za) Yuka Imai SCDC-00129
- Bloody Roar 3 Sound Track SCDC-00082
- Bomberman the Music SCDC-00466
- Bu ni Fu goo SCDC-00316

== C ==
- Capcom Game Music SCDC-00193
- Capcom Game Music VOL.2 SCDC-00195
- Capcom Game Music VOL.3 SCDC-00198
- Castle Fantasia ~Record of Elencia War~ Sound Collection SCDC-00397
- Chaos Seed Soundtrack ~ Game Sound Legend Series SCDC-00522~24
- Choujou Kessen: Saikyou Fighters SNK vs. CAPCOM SCDC-00005
- Close to Inori no Oka [Drama CD] SCDC-00090
- Close to Inori no Oka Sound Collection SCDC-00083
- Cool Cool Toon SCDC-00047

== D ==
- Dark Chronicle Original Sound Tracks SCDC-00243
- Dear Melodies "HEAL" Scitron Discs Girls Vocal Best Selection SCDC-00197
- Dear Melodies "LEAF" Scitron Discs Girls Vocal Best Selection SCDC-00196
- Delete Me SCDC-00486~8
- DoDonPachi II & DoDonPachi Original Soundtracks SCDC-00126
- Dokidoki Pretty League: Lovely Star SCDC-00015
- Dokodemo issho Soundtrack: Koneko mo issho SCDC-00009

== E ==
- Estpolis Biography Sound Track SCDC-00486~89
- Ever 17 Single Collection Action 1 SCDC-00237
- Ever 17 Single Collection Action 2 SCDC-00246
- Ever 17 Single Collection Action 3 SCDC-00256
- Ever 17 Single Collection Action 4 SCDC-00258
- Ever 17 Vocal Collection SCDC-283
- Ever17 ~the out of infinity~ Sound Collection SCDC-00204
- Ever17 ~the out of infinity~ Vocal Collection SCDC-00283

== F ==
- F-Zero GX/AX Original Soundtracks SCDC-00358~9
- Famicom 20th Anniversary Arrange Sound Tracks SCDC-00320
- Famicom 20th Anniversary Original Sound Tracks Vol. 1 SCDC-00317
- Famicom 20th Anniversary Original Sound Tracks Vol. 2 SCDC-00318
- Famicom 20th Anniversary Original Sound Tracks Vol. 3 SCDC-00319
- Famicom MUSIC VOL.2 SCDC-00151
- Famicom Sound History Series "Mario the Music" SCDC-00360
- Fuhai no teio agehacho no rakuin Drama CD SCDC-00074
- Fushigi yugi - Eikou den SCDC-00152
- Futaba Riho First Album SCDC-00379

== G ==
- Gacha Mecha Stadium Saru Battle Sound Tracks!! SCDC-00372
- GALERIANS: Ash Original Soundtrack SCDC-00178
- GALERIANS: Ash Original Soundtrack SCDC-00176
- GALERIANS: The Rion Original Soundtrack SCDC-00177
- Game Music Now & Then SCDC-00292~3
- GAME SOUND LEGEND ~ Famicom Game Music SCDC-00145
- Game Sound Legend Arrange Series - Back In The S.S.T.Band!! ~The Very Best~ SCDC-00312
- Game Sound Legend Arrange Series "G.M.O. Arrange Album" SCDC-00489
- Game Sound Legend Arrange Series "Speed & Wind" SCDC-00375
- Game Sound Legend Series - That's Atari Music SCDC-00313
- Game Sound Legend Series - That's Atari Music Vol.2 SCDC-00314
- Game Sound Legend Series "G.M.O. Christmas Songs" SCDC-00468
- Game Sound Legend Series "Konami Game Music Vol. 4 ~A-JAX~" SCDC-00472
- Game Sound Legend Series "Konamic Game Freaks" SCDC-00465
- Game Sound Legend Series "LEGEND OF GAME MUSIC ~CONSUMER BOX~" SCDC-00497~505
- Game Sound Legend Series -Apollon Game Music Box ~Memorial Sounds of Wizardry~ SCDC-00509~14
- Game Sound Legend Series Box 2 ~Platinum Box~ SCDC-00473
- Game Sound Legend Series CD-BOX (8CDs + DVD) SCDC-00410
- Garasu (Glass) no Mori Sound Collection SCDC-00220
- Garou Densetsu Mark of the Wolves Original Sound Trax SCDC-00006
- Guardian Angel: Sound Collection SCDC-00249
- GUILTY GEAR X Vol.1 (Drama CD) SCDC-00132
- GUILTY GEAR X Vol.2 (Drama CD) SCDC-00137
- Guilty Gear XX Original Soundtrack SCDC-00191~2
- Gunstar Heroes Sound Collection SCDC-00470

== H ==
- HAPPY SALVAGE Audio Drama SCDC-00011
- Happy Salvage Soundtrack. SCDC-00025
- Hard Luck Return of the Heroes Original Soundtrack SCDC-00388
- Hayari Gami Drama CD SCDC-00362
- Hayari Gami Original Soundtrack SCDC-00361

== I ==
- infinity SCDC-00020

== J ==
- Jet Set Radio Future Original Sound Tracks SCDC-00166

== K ==
- Kakutou Chojin: Original Soundtracks SCDC-00253
- Kawaii? Nee, Darlin SCDC-00068
- Killer7 Original Sound Track SCDC-00451~2
- King of Fighters 2000 Arrange Sound Trax, The SCDC-00041
- The King of Fighters 2000 Drama CD SCDC-00042
- The King of Fighters 2000 Original Sound Trax SCDC-00035
- The King of Fighters 2001 Original Sound Trax SCDC-00143
- The King of Fighters 2002: Be The Fighter! Original Sound Trax SCDC-00221
- The King of Fighters 2003 Arrange Tracks - Consumer Version SCDC-00386
- The King of Fighters 2003 Original Sound Tracks SCDC-00337
- The King Of Fighters Best Arrange Collection since 94 to 00 SCDC-00014
- The King of Fighters XI Sound Collection SCDC-00517~8
- King of Fighters Maximum Impact Original Soundtrack SCDC-00363~4
- King of Fighters Neo Wave Arrange Tracks -Consumer Version- SCDC-00455
- KIZUNA ~ Bonds / Fly away SCDC-00377
- Klonoa of the Wind 2 ~Something Forgotten Wished by the World~ Original Soundtrack SCDC-00201~2
- Konami Famicom Super Medley SCDC-00467
- Konami Game Music Vol.1 SCDC-00050
- Konami Game Music Vol.2 SCDC-00060
- Konami Game Music VOL.4 A JAX SCDC-00069
- KONOHANA: True Report Drama CD SCDC-00086
- KONOHANA: True Report Sound Collection SCDC-00076
- Kotasu 006 SCDC-00114
- Koyasu 001 SCDC-00038
- Koyasu 002 SCDC-00044
- Koyasu 003 SCDC-00053
- Koyasu 004 SCDC-00067
- Koyasu 005 SCDC-00077

== L ==
- La Pucelle ~Legend of the Holy Maiden of Light~ Arrange Soundtrack SCDC-00183
- La Pucelle ~Legend of the Holy Maiden of Light~ Drama CD SCDC-190
- Legend Compilation Series: Classics in Game Music SCDC-00463
- Legend Consumer Series: Summer Carnival '92 Recca Original Soundtrack SCDC-00461
- Lilly's Atelier The Alchemist of Zalburg Original Soundtrack SCDC-00118
- LITTLE PRINCESS Puppet Princess of Marl's Kingdom 2: Drama CD SCDC-00030
- Lovely Star SCDC-00013

== M ==
- Majin-kishi Jack Geist Original Soundtrack SCDC-00066
- Makai Senki Disgaea Drama CD SCDC-00278
- MARIO & ZELDA BIG BAND LIVE CD SCDC-00315
- Memories ofF Maxi Single Collection Vol.3 Kaoru Otoha (Yukari Tamura) SCDC-00063
- Memories Off SCDC-00002
- Memories Off - Piano Collection Vol.1 SCDC-00222
- Memories Off - Sound Collection plus alpha SCDC-00157
- Memories Off 1st SCDC-00159
- Memories Off 2nd (Drama series) Vol. Takano no oshaberi & cleaning SCDC-00218
- Memories Off 2nd CD Drama SCDC-00138
- Memories Off 2nd Complete Box SCDC-300
- Memories Off 2nd Drama series Vol.1 Hotaru no oshaberi & cleaning SCDC-00200
- Memories Off 2nd Drama Series Vol.2 Tsubame no oshaberi & cleaning SCDC-00203
- Memories Off 2nd Drama series Vol.3 Tomoe no oshaberi & cleaning SCDC-00207
- Memories Off 2nd Mini Album Collection Vol.2 - Imitation SCDC-00136
- Memories Off 2nd Mini Album Collection Vol.3 SCDC-00141
- Memories Off 2nd Mini Album Collection Vol.4 Tsubame Minami CD Drama SCDC-00144
- Memories Off 2nd Mini Album Collection Vol.5 - Futatsu no Kokoro wa SCDC-00149
- Memories Off 2nd Mini Album Collection Vol.6 SCDC-00150
- Memories Off 2nd Sound Collection SCDC-00127
- Memories Off 3.5 Sound Collection SCDC-00366
- Memories Off Collectors Box [Limited Edition] SCDC-00426~32
- Memories Off Complete Box SCDC-00107
- Memories off maxi single collection Vol.4 SCDC-00070
- Memories Off Orgel Collection SCDC-00394
- Memories Off Piano Collection Vol.2 SCDC-299
- Memories Off Vol 2 Ame no Hi no Omi SCDC-00059
- Memories Off: 2nd Maxi Single Collection Vol.1 Hotaru Shirakawa SCDC-00104
- Memories off: Drama CD SCDC-00016
- Memories Off: Drama CD "Bridge" SCDC-00131
- Memories off: Maxi Single Collection Vol.1 SCDC-00051
- Memories off: Maxi Single Collection Vol.5 Yue Imasaka (Megumi Nasu) SCDC-00075
- Memories off: Maxi Single Collection Vol.6 Minamo Ibuki (Kumi Kawai) with Collection BOX SCDC-00080
- Memories Off: Piano Collection Vol. 2 SCDC-00299
- Metroid Prime & Fusion Original Soundtracks SCDC-00276~7
- Michigan Original Sound Tracks SCDC-00378
- Milky Season - Vocal Collection SCDC-00210
- Milky Season Pair Collection Vol.2 SCDC-00169
- Milky Season Pair Collection Vol.3 SCDC-00175
- Milky Season Pair Collection Vol.6 With Collection Box SCDC-00194
- Milky Season Sound Collection SCDC-00164
- Minna de tsukuru Memo-Off (Memories Off) CD!! SCDC-00174
- Minna de tsukuru Yuukyuu CD!! SCDC-00033
- Missing Blue Drama CD SCDC-00120
- Missing Blue Sound Collection + Alpha SCDC-00101
- Moekan: Original Soundtrack SCDC-00257
- Mr. Driller Soundtracks SCDC-00178~9
- My Merry May Sound Collections SCDC-00184

== N ==
- Namco Arcade 80's SCDC-00272
- Namco Game Music Vol. 1 ~ Game Sound Legend SCDC-217
- Namco Game Music Vol. 2 ~ Game Sound Legend SCDC-00234
- Namco Video Game Music SCDC-00003
- Namcot Super Medley SCDC-00398
- Natsuiro Celebration SCDC-00046
- Natsuiro: Hoshikuzu no Memory - Original Soundtrack SCDC-00433
- Natsukage Original Soundtrack SCDC-00219
- Natsuyume Yawa Sound Collection SCDC-00294
- NEO GEO DJ Station in Gemudora night ! SCDC-00029
- Never7 ~the end of infinity~ Sound Collection SCDC-281
- Night Raid SCDC-00084
- Ninkyouden Toseinin Ichidaiki Original Soundtrack Ohikennasutte! SCDC-00515
- Nintendo Sound History Series "Zelda the Music" SCDC-00395
- Nintendo Sound History Series Disk System Rare Selection SCDC-00421~2

== O ==
- Omoi no Kakera ~Close To~ Sound Collection SCDC-285
- Omoide ni Kawaru Kimi - Memories Off - Sound Collection SCDC-00227
- Omoide ni kawaru kimi - Memories Off: Memory collection Vol.3 - Nayuta Kitahara SCDC-00255
- Omoide ni Kawaru Kimi Memories Off Vocal Collection SCDC-00287
- Omoide ni Kawaru Kimi Memory Collection Vol. 2: Mihu Kashima SCDC-00247
- Oriental Magnetic Yellow ~ The Best Album SCDC-00062

== P ==
- Pachisuro Original Soundtrack SCDC-00071
- Phantasy Star Online Songs of RAGOL Odyssey Soundtrack ~EPISODE 1&2~ SCDC-00215
- Phantom Brave Arrange Soundtracks SCDC-00348
- Phantom Dust - Original Sound Tracks SCDC-00387
- Phantom Kingdom Arrange Album SCDC-00434
- Phantom Kingdom Drama Disc 1 SCDC-00435
- Pia Carrot 2DX SCDC-00072
- Pia Carrot' 2DX - Best Vocal (Song) Collection SCDC-00040
- Pia Carrot 2DX Heroine Collection 1 [Azusa Hinomiri] SCDC-00007
- Pia Carrot 2DX Heroine Collection 3 Mina Hinomori SCDC-00032
- Pia Carrot 2DX Heroine Collection 2 Tsukasa Enomoto SCDC-00021
- Prince of Persia: The Sands of Time Original Sound Tracks SCDC-00383

== R ==
- Radirgy Original Soundtrack SCDC-00508
- Remember 11 Sound Collection SCDC-00340
- Remember 11 Vocal Collection SCDC-00367
- Remember11 Drama CD SCDC-00354
- R-TYPE FINAL ORIGINAL SOUND TRACKS SCDC-288

== S ==
- Samurai Champloo Original Soundtrack [Hip Hop Samurai Action] SCDC-00507
- Samurai Spirits Shinsho (New Chapter) Kenkaku-ibunroku SCDC-00001
- Samurai Spirits Shinsho (New Chapter) Kenkaku-ibunroku Drama CD SCDC-00010
- Samurai Spirits Zero Original Soundtrack (Release Cancelled) SCDC-00338
- Samurai Western: Katsugeki Samurai-dou Soundtrack SCDC-00402
- Scheme Soundtrack / Yuzo Koshiro SCDC-00199
- Sega Arcade '80s Vol. 1 ~ Legend '80s Series SCDC-00245
- Sega Arcade 80's Vol. 2 ~ Legend 80's Series SCDC-252
- Sega Game Music Vol.1 SCDC-00024
- Sega Game Music Vol.2 SCDC-00052
- Sega Game Music Vol.3 ~ After Burner SCDC-00056
- Sega Mega Drive Super Medley SCDC-00450
- Sengoku Basara Drama CD SCDC-00462
- Sengoku Basara Original Soundtrack SCDC-00460
- Sengoku Densho 2001 Original Sound Trax SCDC-00102
- Sentimental Prelude Drama CD Part.1 SCDC-00384
- Sentimental Prelude Drama CD Part.2 SCDC-00385
- Sentimental Prelude Original Soundtrack SCDC-00381
- Separate Blue Original Soundtrack SCDC-00264
- SHADOW HEARTS Original Soundtrack plus1 SCDC-00116
- Shadow Hearts Original Soundtracks plus 1 SCDC-00403
- Shin Sekai gakudan zatsugidan Final ~ The 20th Century Memorial Best ~ SCDC-00061
- Shining Force: Resurrection of the Dark Dragon - Original Soundtrack SCDC-00365
- Silpheed ~PC Sound of Game Arts~ Game Sound Legend Series SCDC-00521
- SNK Game Music SCDC-00106
- SNK Original Best SCDC-00055
- SNK Slot Panic Soundtracks SCDC-00423
- Soseiki DE:VADASY SCDC-00017
- Space Traveller SCDC-00026
- STAR OCEAN BLUE SPHERE Arrange & Sound Trax SCDC-00123
- Street Fighter II GSM Capcom 4 (PCCB-00056)
- Strikers 1999 OST SCDC-00004
- Summer Dream Evening Tale Sound Collection SCDC-294
- SUPER XEVIOUS (GAME SOUND LEGEND) SCDC-00099

== T ==
- Taito Game Music SCDC-00156
- Takahashi Meijin Song Collection - 16 Rensha 20th Anniversary SCDC-464
- Take Off! Soundtrack & Character SCDC-295
- TearRingSaga Original Sound Track SCDC-00091
- TEKKEN 4 Original Sound Tracks SCDC-00181~2
- Tendo + Dokuta Soundtracks SCDC-00424
- Tentama Drama CD SCDC-00079
- Tentama Sound Collection + Alpha SCDC-00073
- The Konamic Game Freaks SCDC-00064
- The Legend of Zelda: Takt of Wind Original Sound Tracks SCDC-00250~1
- THE RETURN OF VIDEO GAME MUSIC SCDC-00122
- The Story of Hero Yoshitsune Original Soundtrack SCDC-00401
- Toshi shita no Otokonoko SCDC-00128
- True Love Story 3 Drama CD term. 1 ~FIRST STEP~ SCDC-00096
- True Love Story 3 Drama CD term. 2 ~HAPPY LUNCH TIME~ SCDC-00103
- True Love Story 3 Drama CD term. 3 ~TAKE YOUR DREAM!~ SCDC-00125
- True Love Story 3 Drama CD term. 4 ~GOING MY WAY~ SCDC-00130
- True Love Story 3 Original Soundtrack SCDC-00089
- True Love Story 3 Vocal Collection SCDC-00135
- True Love Story Special Song Box SCDC-00327
- True Love Story Summer Days, and yet... Drama CD SCDC-291
- True Love Story Summer Days, and yet... Original Soundtrack SCDC-284
- True Love Story Summer days, and yet... Pre Character Series Vol. 1 Hina Kusonese SCDC-00261
- True Love Story Summer days, and yet... Pre Character Series Vol. 2 Satomi Kiriya SCDC-00266
- True Love Story Summer days, and yet... Pre Character Series Vol. 3 Yuiko Shinosaka SCDC-00267
- True Love Story Summer days, and yet... Pre Character Series Vol. 4 Nayu Kamiya SCDC-00268
- True Love Story Summer days, and yet... Pre Character Series Vol. 5 Hitomi Arimori SCDC-00269
- True Love Story Summer days, and yet... Pre Character Series Vol. 6 Yako Mukai SCDC-00270
- True Love Story Summer Days, and yet... Vocal Collection SCDC-296
- True Love Story Summer Days, and yet... Vocal Collection SCDC-00296
- Twinkle Star Sprites: La Petite Princesse Soundtrack SCDC-00453~4

== W ==
- W ~Wish~ Sound Collection SCDC-00374
- Wangan Midnight Soundtrack SCDC-00188

== Y ==
- Yowaki na Bokura/NERVOUS SCDC-00081
- Yukyu final concert Manatsu no sotsugyoshiki (Yukyu Ongakusai) SCDC-00048
- Yukyu Gensoukyoku 3 - Perpetual Blue Drama CD: Part 5 SCDC-00027
- Yukyu Gensoukyoku 3 - Perpetual Blue Drama CD: Part 6 SCDC-00028
- Yukyu Gensoukyoku 3 Perpetual Blue Part.1 SCDC-00018
- Yukyu Gensoukyoku 3 Perpetual Blue Part.2 SCDC-00019
- Yukyu Gensoukyoku 3 Perpetual Blue Vol.3 SCDC-00022
- Yukyu Gensoukyoku 3 Perpetual Blue Vol.4 SCDC-00023
- Yukyu Gensoukyoku All Star Project Soundtrack SCDC-00034
- Yukyu Gensoukyoku Perpetual Blue SCDC-00037
- Yukyu Gensoukyoku Perpetual Blue Part.7 SCDC-00036
- Yukyu Kumikyoku All Star Project Vol.2 SCDC-00043
- Yukyu Kumikyoku: Audio Drama CD Vol.1 SCDC-00039
- Yukyu THE SONGS II SCDC-00085
- Yume no Tsubasa Drama CD SCDC-00058
- Yume no tsubasa Sound Collection SCDC-00045

== See also ==
- List of record labels
