= Shadow Hearts =

- The logo for the first Shadow Hearts; each Shadow Hearts logo uses a similar style.
- Genre: Role-playing
- Developer: Sacnoth (Note: Known from 2002 to 2007 as Nautilus.)
- Publishers: JP: Aruze SNK (Note: Koudelka only.); NA: Midway Games Xseed Games (Note: Shadow Hearts: From the New World only.) Infogrames; EU: Midway Games Ghostlight Infogrames
- Creators: Hiroki Kikuta; Matsuzo Machida
- Platforms: PlayStation, PlayStation 2
- First release: Koudelka; December 16, 1999
- Latest release: Shadow Hearts: From the New World; July 28, 2005

Shadow Hearts (Note: Shadōhātsu (Japanese: シャドウハーツ)) is a series of role-playing video games, consisting of a trilogy of titles for the PlayStation 2 (PS2) and their predecessor Koudelka for the PlayStation. The entire series was developed by Sacnoth (later Nautilus); Koudelka was published by SNK in 1999, while the Shadow Hearts trilogy were published by Aruze from 2001 to 2005. Multiple other publishers handled the titles overseas. The Shadow Hearts chronology extends from the late 1890s to the 1920s, following different casts of characters caught in supernatural mysteries. The setting combines alternate history and Lovecraftian horror, with real-world figures making appearances, and each title has multiple endings.

Production of Koudelka began with the formation of Sacnoth in 1997 by Hiroki Kikuta and a number of other former Square staff. Internal conflict between Kikuta and the developers eventually led to Kikuta resigning, with planned sequels to Koudelka being cancelled. The setting was instead used by Matsuzo Machida for the original Shadow Hearts. While Machida planned to continue the series after 2005's Shadow Hearts: From the New World, these plans never materialized, with Sacnoth being absorbed into Aruze and ceasing game production in 2007.

The series saw limited media expansions, with Koudelka in particular receiving both a novelization and a manga continuation based on the initial story plan. While Koudelka saw mixed reactions from critics, the Shadow Hearts trilogy saw both contemporary and retrospective praise and is Sacnoth's best-known product. Shadow Hearts: Covenant in particular has been praised as one of the PS2's best RPGs, and was a commercial success for its publishers.

== Games ==
Release timeline
1999	Koudelka
2000
2001	Shadow Hearts
2002–2003
2004	Shadow Hearts: Covenant
2005	Shadow Hearts: From the New World

- Koudelka was released for the PlayStation in 1999 in Japan, and 2000 in Western territories. Set in 1898, the story follows Koudelka Iasant as she uncovers a supernatural mystery in a haunted manor. While not bearing the series title, it takes place in the same setting as the later games.
- Shadow Hearts, the first entry in the series proper, was released for the PlayStation 2 in 2001 in Japan and North America, and 2002 in Europe. Set in 1913 and 1914, the plot follows Yuri Hyuga as he protects exorcist Alice Elliot from the attention of a rival magician.
- Shadow Hearts: Covenant, known in Japan as Shadow Hearts II, (Note: Shadōhātsu Tsū (Japanese: シャドウハーツII)) was released for the PS2 in 2004 in North America and Japan, and 2005 in Europe. A Japan-exclusive director's cut with additional content was released in 2005. Set six months after Shadow Hearts, the story follows Karin Koenig as she is drawn into a conflict between Yuri and secret society Sapientes Gladio.
- Shadow Hearts: From the New World was released for the PS2 in 2005 in Japan, 2006 in North America, and 2007 in Europe. Set in the Americas, the story focuses on the journey of private investigator Johnny Garland as he accompanies the Native American Shania on a quest after a woman dubbed Lady.

== Common elements ==
=== Gameplay ===
A battle in Shadow Hearts: Covenant showing elements associated with the series, including monster transformations, and the timing-based Judgement Ring.

The gameplay of the Shadow Hearts series follows a similar formula; they are role-playing video games featuring the exploration of multiple locations across the world, and turn-based battle systems triggered through both random and scripted encounters. Other elements include optional content such as minigames and side quests. The basic system was established in the first Shadow Hearts, with the next two entries adding new battle elements such as combination attacks and versions of actions that allowed a character to act twice in one turn.

A key element of all three entries for both battle and elements outside battle is the Judgement Ring. Represented as a disc with colored areas on its surface, the player's aim is to hit those areas as a pointer passes over them; hit areas are split into different colors, with narrower red areas at the end of each areas increasing the effectiveness of the chosen action. Each entry features at least one character who has the power to either absorb or make pacts with supernatural entities and take on their forms and abilities. Transforming takes sanity points, a resource that when fully depleted causes a character to go berserk and act independently in battle.

Koudelka combines two distinct styles of gameplay; exploration from fixed camera perspectives and puzzle solving similar to earlier entries in the Resident Evil series; and turn-based combat playing out on a grid triggered through a random encounter system. The game's original concept called for real-time combat during exploration using surrounding objects as weapons, but internal staff conflict led to a more traditional RPG combat system, separating it from the rest of the gameplay and narrative.

=== Setting and characters ===
The Shadow Hearts universe is set in an alternate history version of Earth; this version of Earth blends real events and figures from history with supernatural events and Lovecraftian horror. Multiple elements of the series' world and enemy design were drawn from H. P. Lovecraft's Cthulhu Mythos, meant as a deliberate contrast with the enemies of other RPGs at the time. All titles within the series have multiple endings, with a recurring element in Koudelka and Shadow Hearts being that the canon narrative led from their "bad" endings. The original world design drew from several sources, including the writing of Lovecraft, Umberto Eco, William Hope Hodgson and Lord Dunsany. Later narrative design drew from the work of manga creator Go Nagai and screenwriter Keisuke Fujikawa.

Koudelka takes place in the late 1890s, a time chosen as a turning point between an era of superstition and the modern technological age. It is set in Nemeton, a fictional converted priory in Aberystwyth, Wales; the setting was inspired by ruins seen on a research trip taken by the developers to Pembrokeshire. Shadow Hearts, which takes place in 1913-1914, spreads its events across the Eurasian continent. Covenant takes place six months after the first game in 1915 during World War I. From the New World, while taking place in the same universe as earlier entries, is a spin-off set in the Americas in 1929 during the Prohibition era.

The plots of Shadow Hearts and Covenant are linked by the romance between Yuri Hyuga, a "Harmonixer" capable of capturing and shapeshifting into monsters; and Alice Elliot, an exorcist who holds a key power. During the canon series of events, Alice dies saving Yuri's soul, then Yuri uses an opportunity to return to the beginning of Shadow Hearts and redo events so he can save her. Other recurring characters are Koudelka protagonist Koudelka Iasant; Roger Bacon, a 12th-century philosopher who achieved imperfect immortality; and the Valentine family, a clan of friendly vampires. A recurring plot point across the series is the Émigré Manuscript or Document, a text filled with an ancient civilization's magic for reviving the dead; use of the Émigré Manuscript forms the central mystery of Koudelka and acts as a key plot point in each Shadow Hearts entry.

== Production ==
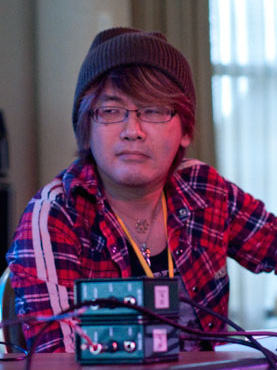
Hiroki Kikuta (pictured 2011), founder of Sacnoth, created the original concept for Koudelka, the origin of the Shadow Hearts series.

The Shadow Hearts series began with the production and release of Koudelka. It was developed at Sacnoth, a game developer founded with funding from SNK by former Square composer Hiroki Kikuta; he acted as the game's producer, director, writer and composer. Production began in 1997 following the company's foundation. His aim was to create an unconventional horror RPG, though he ended up clashing with the game design staff, and following the release of Koudelka resigned from Sacnoth. This led to a series of sequels continuing Koudelka's storyline being scrapped.

Shadow Hearts, which began production following the release of Koudelka, was directed and written by Koudelka art director Matsuzo Machida (originally credited as Matsuzo Itakura). During this period, Sacnoth's parent company SNK was bought out by Aruze (later Universal Interactive), giving Aruze control of the Shadow Hearts intellectual property. Machida wanted to create an RPG with Shadow Hearts that fell outside the typical settings of other RPGs, using the world of Koudelka as a starting point and building upon it with original lore. Shadow Hearts was the last game produced by Sacnoth before its rebranding as Nautilus, with its responsibilities split between production of the Shadow Hearts series and supporting work on Aruze's arcade machine business.

In response to feedback from the first game, Machida shifted the tone of Covenant to incorporate more humor, making its central theme the pursuit of happiness. From the New World was produced on a tight time schedule by the same team as Covenant. The focus was on refining and building upon the gameplay mechanics of Covenant rather than changing anything, with the new setting and characters intended to give series newcomers an easy gateway. While Machida had plans for a true sequel to Covenant, Nautilus was absorbed into Aruze and rebranded in 2007, ceasing game production operations and eventually being absorbed into Aruze in 2009. Also in 2007, Aruze patented with the Judgement Ring battle system. Many of the Shadow Hearts team had by this point moved to feelplus, contributing to the production of several titles including Lost Odyssey. While Universal Interactive maintains the Shadow Hearts trademark, the company stated in 2021 that there were no plans to continue the series or remake any of its entries.

=== Graphic design and localization ===
The characters of Koudelka were designed by manga artist Yūji Iwahara, who created over 100 character sketches for the project. For the three Shadow Hearts titles, the characters were designed by Miyako Kato. Series protagonist Yuri was designed to both appear and behave unlike the typical RPG protagonist of the time. During her work on From the New World, several characters went through extensive redesigns. The CGI cutscenes for Koudelka and Shadow Hearts were created by Digital Media Labs. Kikuta supervised the motion capture of real-time cutscenes for Koudelka, conducted by Santa Monica-based special-effects company FutureLight. The CGI cutscenes for Covenant and From the New World were created by external company Avant. Real-time cutscenes for Covenant were made more realistic, with motion capture being used for most characters.

Koudelka, released overseas by Infogrames, had its voice acting in English across all regions. For Shadow Hearts, the original dialogue was in Japanese and localized into English by Wordbox, with dubbing by TAJ Productions. Covenant was translated into English by ZPang America, with dubbing handled by Intersound Post Production. Both Shadow Hearts and Covenant were released overseas by Midway Games. From the New World was released in North America by Xseed Games, acting as one of its first projects alongside Wild Arms 4. In Europe, the title was released by Ghostlight. The translation of all three Shadow Hearts titles was handled by Jeremy Blaustein, who had previously worked on the Pokémon anime series, Valkyrie Profile and Metal Gear Solid. During localization, Yuri's first name was changed from "Urmnaf". Blaustein chose "Yuri" as he wanted a name that sounded Russian to reflect the character's origins. He later remembered Covenant as one of his favorite projects.

=== Music ===
The music for the Shadow Hearts series was primarily composed by Yoshitaka Hirota, who had earlier worked as a sound designer on Koudelka. Hirota's work on the series music was influenced by his work as a sound designer, incorporating sound effects alongside a wide range of music genres. Hirota collaborated with several different composers on each soundtrack. For Shadow Hearts, the collaborators were Masaharu Iwata, Yasunori Mitsuda and Ryo Fukuda. For Covenant, Mitsuda returned along with series newcomers Kenji Ito and Tomoko Kobayashi. With From the New World, Fukuda returned and was joined by Tomoko Imoto and Hirotomi Imoto. The music of Koudelka was composed by Kikuta, who found the experience of writing it to be the easiest aspect of the game's production. All four games received soundtrack albums released between 1999 and 2005, while Hirota released an arrange album in 2005.

== Reception ==
Aggregate review scores
Game	GameRankings	Metacritic
Koudelka	60%	
Shadow Hearts		73/100
Shadow Hearts: Covenant		85/100
Shadow Hearts: From the New World		76/100

The Japanese release of Koudelka was "moderately successful" according to a Western report. Shadow Hearts had estimated sales of approximately 110,000 units, sales referred to by Aruze as low. By contrast, Covenant was a commercial success for both Aruze and Midway in its respective release regions. Similarly, From the New World was cited as a sales success by its respective Japanese and North American publishers.

Chris Breault of Kill Screen, in an article celebrating the first two Shadow Hearts titles, noted its blend of many conventional elements while being "loyal in the end only to the principle of staying weird". Game Informer's Kimberley Wallace wrote a retrospective article on the series, praising the series as a forgotten classic and citing its combination of dark, emotional and comedic content as the reason for its continued niche appeal. In an article about Covenant for RPGFan, Stephanie Sybydlo cited the series as "cool and atmospheric", praising its blending of history and magic together with its combat system; in the same article Robert Fenner negatively noted the shift towards humor that began with Covenant and was fully expressed in From the New World. Anthony John Agnello of GamesRadar praised the series for its "inky, fast-beating heart" that expressed itself best in Covenant. Anime News Network's Todd Ciolek noted that Shadow Hearts was Sacnoth's best-recognised product and stood out during the PS2 era against other RPGs. Cameron Teague of PlayStation Lifestyle cited the series as a candidate of a possible return on the PlayStation 5, citing its atmosphere and themes.

Contemporary reception of Koudelka was mixed, with many praising its storyline and characters while faulting its gameplay and graphics compared to other titles of the time. Shadow Hearts was praised for its narrative and the Judgement Ring mechanic, but many faulted its graphics as inferior to other titles for the time and disliked other elements of its gameplay. Covenant was praised as a stronger entry than its predecessor overall, with most praise going to its graphics and gameplay improvements. Multiple websites later ranked Covenant as one of the best RPGs, or games in general, from the PS2. GameTrailers called Covenant "the greatest JRPG that no-one talks about" due to its unconventional tone and battle system. From the New World saw a less positive response, with many faulting its change of tone and more complicated gameplay, though it was still seen as a high-quality product.

== Related media and cameos ==
Koudelka was supported by several medial expansions. A CD drama based on the game, with Japanese actors and excerpts from its score, was released in November 1999 by Scitron Digital Contents. The first of a three-volume manga adaptation, written and illustrated by the game's illustrator Yūji Iwahara, was published in November 1999 by Kadokawa Shoten; the third and final volume was published in September 2000. The manga would have bridged the narrative gap between Koudelka and its scrapped sequels. A novelization, Koudelka - The Mansion's Scream by Nahoko Korekata, was published by ASCII Media Works in February 2000 as part of its Famitsu Bunko imprint.

Shadow Hearts was supplemented by a single guidebook published by Enterbrain in July 2001. Covenant was supplemented with three strategy guides between February and May 2004 by SoftBank Publishing, Kadokawa and MediaWorks respectively; and a guidebook featuring behind-the-scenes material published by SoftBank in June 2004. Also in June, a manga anthology featuring both serious and comedic vignettes surrounding the game's cast was produced by Studio DNA. From the New World was supplemented by two strategy guides published in September and October respectively by MediaWorks and Enterbrain, and a behind-the-scenes guidebook published by Softbank in November.

Several characters from Shadow Hearts series cameoed in Chaos Wars, a 2006 crossover video game developed by Idea Factory and featuring cameos from multiple series including Gungrave and Growlanser. In 2008, Aruze used Covenant as a theme for one of its line of slot machines.

In 2022, Machida, Kato, and Hirota later co-launched a Kickstarter campaign for a spiritual successor titled Penny Blood, featuring similar mechanics to the Shadow Hearts series. The campaign launched on August 29 as part of a project to fund both Penny Blood and Armed Fantasia, a spiritual successor to the Wild Arms; the two games had a combined minimum goal of $750,000.
