= Jeremy Blaustein =

American translator and voice director (born 1966)

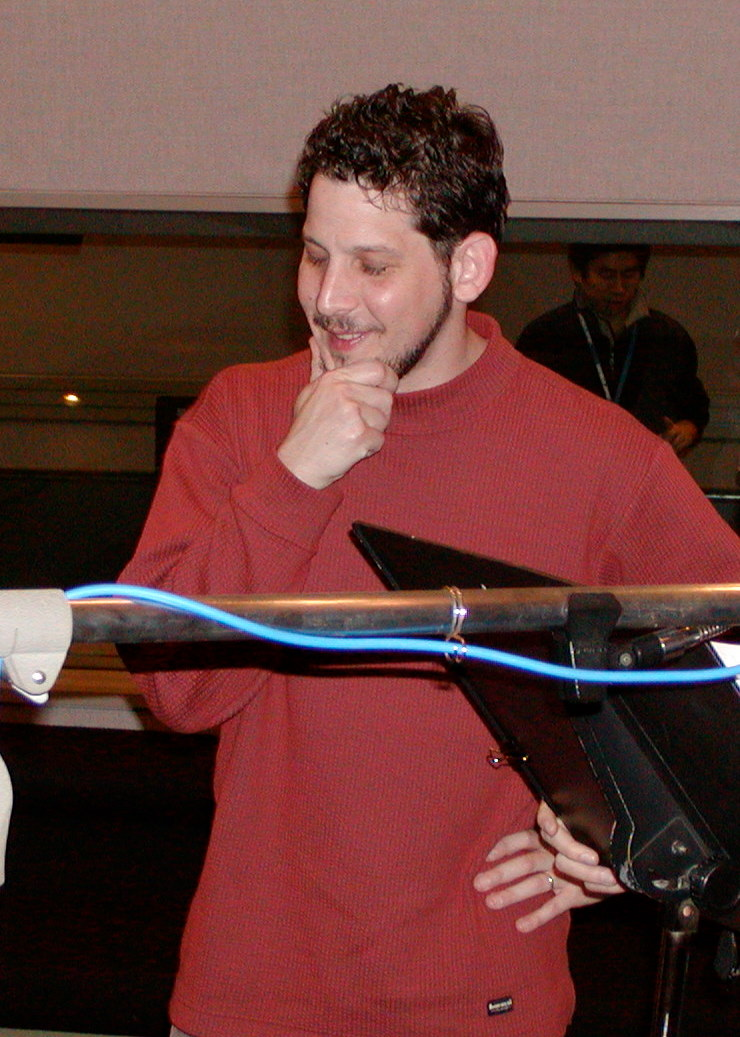
- Blaustein at Silent Hill 3 recording session in 2002
- Born: 1966 (age 59–60)
- Occupations: Translator; voice director; voice actor
- Years active: 1988–present
- Relatives: Maddie Blaustein (sister)

Jeremy Blaustein (born 1966) is an American translator, localizer, voice director and occasional voice actor. He has worked as localizer and translator of Japanese media to western English speaking audiences, most notably in the mid- to late-1990s for Konami video game titles. Blaustein also worked as translator for various anime series.

== Personal background ==
Jeremy Blaustein was born to a Jewish family. He is the younger brother of Maddie Blaustein.

== Career ==
Blaustein is best known for his translation work in video games, though he has also worked as a voice actor and motion caption stand-in. Some of his most notable translation work includes Metal Gear Solid, Castlevania: Symphony of the Night, and Silent Hill 2, as well as the Pokémon anime and movies.

Blaustein currently lives in Japan. He is president of the Japanese-based video game localization agency Dragonbaby.

== Major works ==
=== Video games ===
- Castlevania: Symphony of the Night
- Contra: Hard Corps
- Dark Cloud 2
- Dragon Warrior VII
- Eve of Extinction
- Kamaitachi no Yoru
- Metal Gear Solid
- Shadow Hearts
- Shadow Hearts: Covenant
- Shenmue (casting only)
- Silent Hill 2
- Silent Hill 3
- Silent Hill 4: The Room
- Snatcher
- Suikoden II
- Valkyrie Profile

=== Television ===
- Pokémon (formerly)
- Funky Cops (2003–2004)
- Ninja Warrior (2008–2009)
- Muscle Rankings (2008–2009)
