= Hiroki Kikuta =

Japanese composer and game designer (born 1962)

- 菊田 裕樹
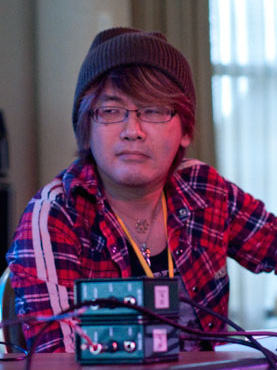
- Kikuta in 2011
- Born: Yūki Kikuta; August 29, 1962 (age 64); Aichi Prefecture, Japan
- Education: Kansai University
- Occupations: Composer; arranger; scenario writer; game designer
- Years active: 1991–present
- Musical career
- Genres: Rock; orchestral; fusion
- Label: Scarlet Moon

Hiroki Kikuta (菊田 裕樹, Kikuta Hiroki; born August 29, 1962, as Yūki Kikuta) is a Japanese composer and game designer. His major works are Secret of Mana, Trials of Mana, Soukaigi, and Koudelka, for which he also acted as producer and concept designer. He has composed music for seven other games, and worked as a concept designer in addition to composer for the unreleased MMORPG Chou Bukyo Taisen. He became interested in music at an early age, but earned a degree in Religious Studies, Philosophy, and Cultural Anthropology from Kansai University. He spent the next few years working first as a manga illustrator, then as a composer for anime series, before coming to work for Square in 1991.

After composing the soundtracks for his first three best-known works, he formed his own video game production company, Sacnoth, for which he was the president and CEO. After producing and composing Koudelka in 1999, he left to become a freelance composer. Since his departure he has formed his own record label, Norstrilia, through which he produces albums of his own compositions and collaborations with other artists, as well as his previous scores. His music has been performed in concerts such as the Symphonic Fantasies concerts in Cologne, Germany in September 2009, and selections of his works have been published as piano arrangements in sheet music books.

== Biography ==
=== Early life ===
As a child, Kikuta was very interested in music, but while growing up in rural Japan had limited access to it. As a result, he would listen to whatever music was on the radio, regardless of genre, and also to the music in films. His first instrument was a classical guitar, which he taught himself without lessons. It was not until he got a synthesizer, however, that he began to feel his potential as a composer. He never received any form of formal musical training, and instead taught himself by reading music theory books and listening to a wide variety of musical genres. Kikuta went on to earn an interdisciplinary degree in Religious Studies, Philosophy, and Cultural Anthropology from Kansai University, which he attended from 1981 to 1984. While in college, Kikuta played arcade video games such as The Tower of Druaga (1984).

After graduating from Kansai, Kikuta worked first as a manga illustrator under the pseudonym and later as an anime composer. The manga he illustrated, including one titled Raven, were done under the pen name Yūki Nijūroku (結城 二十六). As an anime composer, he worked on The Adventure of Robin Hood and The Legend of Snow White.

In 1991, Kikuta was hired by Square (now Square Enix), as a composer. After being rejected by his first choice, Nihon Falcom, he applied to Square without expecting to be hired, as they had many applicants for the job and he had never played any of the company's games. At the interview, however, Nobuo Uematsu was attracted to their shared love of progressive rock, and he was chosen over 100 other applicants. He started off debugging Final Fantasy IV and creating sound effects for Romancing SaGa, as there were not enough game projects in development to open up new jobs for Square's new hires, but Kikuta was soon given game soundtracks to compose.

=== Career ===
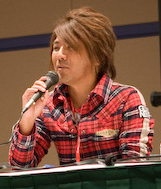
Kikuta in 2008

During his seven years at Square, Kikuta composed the soundtracks to only three games: Secret of Mana and Trials of Mana for the Super Nintendo Entertainment System and Soukaigi for the PlayStation. Kikuta says that he was given complete freedom to compose the soundtracks, in that he was given no direction at all as to how to compose the music; he began working on the music before the design of the game was finalized. This freedom was helped by the fact that Uematsu ran the music group as a separate division in the company from the game developers. Kikuta was chosen for Secret of Mana after Kenji Ito, the composer for the first game in the Mana series, Final Fantasy Adventure, was unable to work on the sequel due to other demands, including the soundtrack to Romancing SaGa. At the time, Square typically had composers dedicated to one game throughout its development, and so Ito could not take on both projects at once.

Rather than create MIDI versions of his compositions, like most game composers of that time did, and hand these over to the sound engineering department, Kikuta made his own samples that matched the hardware capabilities of the Super Nintendo. This way he would know exactly how the pieces would sound on the system's hardware instead of having to deal with audio hardware differences between the original composition and the limited palette of the Super Nintendo. Kikuta spent nearly 24 hours a day in his office working on the soundtrack, alternating between composing and editing. The first track he composed as "The Child of the Fairy Tribe". Secret of Mana led to an arranged album, Secret of Mana+, which is composed of a single 50-minute track made up of "experimental" sounds like waterfalls, bird calls, and cell phone sounds. Kikuta said in 2024 that he made the arranged album as a response to the stress of dealing with the restrictions of creating the original soundtrack, by instead creating something unrestrained and free.

For Trials of Mana, Kikuta was assisted by a sound programmer, Hidenori Suzuki, which allowed him to compose over three times the amount of music he had created for Secret of Mana. Kikuta decided to take the music in a "different direction" than Secret of Mana's, as he did not think he could surpass it with the same concept. The move to the PlayStation for Soukaigi allowed Kikuta to focus on creating live music for the soundtrack, rather than tweaking the synthesizer instruments to make the music files fit in the game cartridge as he had to for the Super Nintendo. He used the added audio processing power to expand his musical creativity, including pieces such as songs in unintelligible Thai and Malaysian by Japanese singers. The game itself, however, was not a success, and Kikuta decided that he wanted more direct control over the next project he worked on.

After Kikuta finished Soukaigi, he left Square and founded the video game development company Sacnoth, assuming the position of the president and CEO from 1998 to 1999. During this time, the company created Koudelka for the PlayStation; Kikuta was credited as the concept designer, game planner, scenario writer, producer and composer. His philosophy in designing video games is that the best projects have a limited number of people designing the overall experience and making key decisions. He tried to follow this philosophy in creating Koudelka, and tried to bring a sense of "obsessive passion" to the project, reading what he claims were over 100 books on British history and taking the design team on a trip to Wales to study the country. The game was released in December 1999 to poor reviews which criticized the game's combat system, though they praised the concept, art direction, and music. Kikuta left Sacnoth soon after; the company changed its name to Nautilus and went on to produce four more games including the Shadow Hearts series before folding in 2007.

In March 2001, Kikuta founded Norstrilia, named after the novel of the same name. The company serves as his private record label, and publishes his albums. For the next few years he worked as concept designer, game planner, and composer for Chou Bukyo Taisen, a Chinese MMORPG, the original design for which he proposed to Enix. Development of the game ceased in 2004 due to disagreements between Enix and the Chinese company that was to maintain the game while it was in progress and it was never released. He spent the next few years composing for video games only released in Japan, including the eroge visual novel Sora no Iro, Mizu no Iro and the MMORPG Concerto Gate. Beginning in 2010 he started working as a composer for projects with several artists, such as Soulcalibur V (2010) and Rise of Mana (2014), which continues to date; his first solo work since 2010 was Indivisible in 2019.

Kikuta released Lost Files, his first album of original music, in 2006. The album includes the demo tapes Kikuta submitted when first applying for the job of game composer at Square, using the sound source of the Nintendo Entertainment System. It was followed in August 2007 by his second original album, Alphabet Planet. He has also composed three other albums and two singles in conjunction with other singers or performers; these albums have been released through his Norstrilia label. He released a third original album in 2011, titled Tiara.

== Legacy ==
A piece from Secret of Mana was performed by the Tokyo Symphony Orchestra for the third Orchestral Game Music Concert in 1993, while one from Trials of Mana was performed for the fifth event in 1996. His music from Secret of Mana was also performed at the fifth Symphonic Game Music Concert in 2007 at the Gewandhaus Leipzig, Germany. Music from Secret of Mana made up one fourth of the music in the Symphonic Fantasies concerts in Cologne in September 2009 which were produced by Thomas Böcker as a part of the Game Concerts series. In 2012, five more performances of Symphonic Fantasies were given in Tokyo, Stockholm, and again in Cologne, with an additional performance in 2016 in London with the London Symphony Orchestra conducted by Eckehard Stier.

Two compilation books of piano sheet music from the Mana series have been published as Seiken Densetsu Best Collection Piano Solo Sheet Music first and second editions; songs from Secret of Mana and Trials of Mana are featured in both. All songs in each book have been rewritten by Asako Niwa as beginning to intermediate level piano solos, though they are meant to sound as much like the originals as possible. Selections of remixes of Kikuta's work appear on Japanese remix albums, called dōjin, and on English remixing websites such as OverClocked ReMix. Kikuta has said that he enjoys listening to these works, mentioning OverClocked ReMix by name.

== Musical style and influences ==
Kikuta finds composing music to be natural, "like breathing". He considers it to be his "vocation", and contrasts it with designing and creating video games, which he calls his "wish" and finds to be very difficult to do in comparison to composition. Kikuta does not worry about the style of music that he composes, considering it to only be a tool or method. As a result, his music is frequently composed of combinations of styles mixed together. He is inspired to create his music by things that he has seen, especially while traveling; he credits much of the musical imagery in Secret of Mana and Trials of Mana as being inspired by several islands in Fiji he has visited. Rather than trying to be a "pure artist" that creates art for art's sake, Kikuta says that his primary goal in composing is to entertain the listeners. He has not been influenced by other video game composers, though he claims to admire Hitoshi Sakimoto, who also worked at Square. He has named Pink Floyd as his single biggest musical influence, and guitarist Allan Holdsworth as the artist he would most like to collaborate with. Kikuta stated that his favorite song he composed was "ouverture" from Concerto Gate.

== Games ==
All works listed below were solely composed by Kikuta unless otherwise noted.

Games
Year	Title	Notes	Ref.
1992	Romancing SaGa	sound effects	
1993	Secret of Mana		
1995	Trials of Mana		
1998	Soukaigi		
1999	Koudelka	Producer, writer and composer	
2004	Sora no Iro, Mizu no Iro		
2005	Sakura Relaxation		
2005	Nidzuma wa Sailor Fuku		
2006	Tennin-So Kitan		
2006	Kaijinki		
2007	Concerto Gate	with Kenji Ito	
2010	Shining Hearts		
2011	Tiara		
2012	Soul Calibur V	with various others	
2012	Demons' Score	"Walpurgis Night Fever"	
2013	Atelier Escha & Logy: Alchemists of the Dusk Sky	with various others	
2014	Rise of Mana	"The Drip Drip Drip of Memory"	
2015	Kakuriyo no Mon	with various others	
2016	Earthlock: Festival of Magic	"Halls of Karba"	
2016	Pankapu	"Eternal Orbis Chronicles"	
2017	Unraveled: Tale of the Shipbreaker's Daughter	with Dale North	
2018	Tangledeep	with Andrew Aversa, Grant Kirkhope, and Norihiko Hibino	
2018	Secret of Mana Remake	with various others	
2019	YIIK: A Postmodern RPG	arrangements	
2019	Pixel Noir	arrangements with Kunal Majmudar	
2019	Indivisible		
2020
2020	Trials of Mana	Music supervisor	
2021	Hunt the Night	guest composer	
2021	Rakugaki Kingdom	"IXTL"	
2022	Trinity Trigger		
2022	Sin Chronicle	"With the Sacred Prism"	
2024	Visions of Mana	with Tsuyoshi Sekito and Ryo Yamazaki	
Upcoming	Orange Island	with Mark Sparkling	
