= Quatre Motets sur des thèmes grégoriens =

1960 motets by Maurice Duruflé

- Motets by Maurice Duruflé
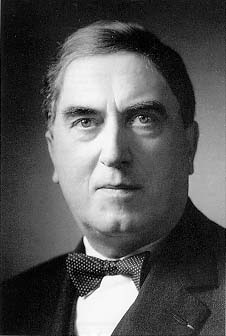
- The composer c. 1962
- English: Four motets on Gregorian themes
- Opus: 10
- Text: liturgical and biblical texts
- Language: Latin
- Composed: 1960
- Dedication: Auguste Le Guennant
- Performed: 4 May 1961: Paris
- Published: 1960
- Scoring: SATB a cappella

Quatre Motets sur des thèmes grégoriens (Four motets on Gregorian themes), Op. 10, are four sacred motets composed by Maurice Duruflé in 1960, based on Gregorian themes. He set Ubi caritas et amor, Tota pulchra es, Tu es Petrus and Tantum ergo.

== History ==
Maurice Duruflé composed the four motets in 1960, based on Gregorian themes, as he had done before in his Requiem of 1948. He set Latin texts, scored for unaccompanied voices: a mixed choir in Nos. 1, 3 and 4, and a women's choir in No. 2. Duruflé dedicated the work to Auguste Le Guennant, the director of the Gregorian Institute of Paris. The motets were published in 1960 by Éditions Durand, Duruflé's primary publisher. The motets were first performed on 4 May 1961 at the church of Saint-Merri in Paris by the Chorale Stéphane Caillat.

== Structure, texts and music ==
The four motets set Latin texts for different liturgical occasions:

1. Ubi caritas et amor
2. Tota pulchra es
3. Tu es Petrus
4. Tantum ergo

The text for the first motet is Ubi caritas et amor ("Where charity and love are"), an antiphon for Maundy Thursday. Tota pulchra es ("Thou art all fair") is a text from Vespers for the Marian Feast of the Immaculate Conception. The text for the third motet, Tu es Petrus ("Thou art Peter"), addressing Simon as Peter the Apostle, is taken from Matthew 16:18. The last motet is based on Tantum ergo, the conclusion of the Pange lingua by St. Thomas Aquinas.

In the four motets, Duruflé based his music on Gregorian chant. He combines the chant lines with a polyphonic setting. The chant is always present in one or more voices. The music has been described as "rich in subtle harmonies, well-written for voices, and reminiscent of impressionism". A reviewer notes: "Here Duruflé shows his particular genius for invoking the spiritual element of plainsong in a polyphonic context, achieving a suppleness of rhythm alongside strong characterization of each text."

== Recordings ==
In recordings, the motets are often combined with Duruflé's Requiem, sharing the same approach of polyphonic music based on Gregorian chant. They have been recorded for example by King's College Choir, conducted by Stephen Cleobury and the Corydon Singers conducted by Matthew Best. On recordings, as in the liturgy, single movements have been performed to match a context. The Cambridge Singers, conducted by John Rutter, performed Ubi caritas in a collection This is the Day of music on royal occasions, while the Westminster Abbey Choir, conducted by James O'Donnell, performed Tu es Petrus for an album The Feast of Saint Peter the Apostle at Westminster Abbey. The Houston Chamber Choir's recording, Duruflé: Complete Choral Works won the award for Best Choral Performance at the 62nd Annual GRAMMY Awards in January 2020.

== Bibliography ==
- Cochard, Alain (2017). "Maurice Duruflé (1902–1986) / Requiem, Op. 9 (1961 version)". Naxos.
- Sutton, Wadham (1989). "Quatre Motets sur des thèmes grégoriens, Op 1". Hyperion Records.
- "Quatre Motets sur des thèmes grégoriens, Op 10" (in French). Association Maurice & Marie-Madeleine Duruflé. 2017.
- "Quatre Motets sur des Thèmes Grégoriens op. 10" (in German). Diocese of Cologne. 2017.
