= Auguste Le Guennant =

French organist and composer (1881–1972)

- Born: 10 January 1881; Auray, France
- Died: 17 May 1972 (aged 91); 14th arrondissement of Paris
- Education: Schola Cantorum de Paris
- Occupations: Organist; Church musician; Composer; Music educator; School director

Auguste Joseph-Marie François Le Guennant (10 January 1881 – 17 May 1972) was a French organist, church musician and composer. He was, after positions as organist and head of the chapel in Paris and Nantes, the director and teacher at the Gregorian Institute of Paris, as a specialist of Gregorian chant.

== Biography ==
Born in 1881 in Auray (Morbihan), Auguste Le Guennant was the son of Auguste Marie Le Guennant and his wife Valentine Joséphine Françoise le Duff. Le Guennant studied at the Schola Cantorum de Paris – the organ with Alexandre Guilmant and composition with Vincent d'Indy. He held for some time the position of organist at the grand organ of Notre-Dame de Clignancourt, and left Paris in 1905 to become head of the chapel at Notre-Dame-de-Bon-Port in Les Sables-d'Olonne, and from 1908 at the Basilica of Saint-Nicolas in Nantes. He founded the mixed group A Capella in this city, in collaboration with A. Mahot.

The Mutual Edition of the Schola Cantorum published his Adagietto for organ, and an O Salutaris for four mixed voices. Biton published an accompanying book on Gregorian chant.

In 1925, Le Guennant arrived at the Gregorian Institute of Paris as director and teacher of Gregorian chant, succeeding Dom Joseph Gajard of the Solesmes Abbey. After World War II, he organized many Gregorian sessions, not only in France but also in Fátima, and even Rio de Janeiro. Still teaching at the Gregorian Institute in Paris, Le Guennant considerably boosted the teaching of Gregorian chant by creating centres of study in several countries. When Maurice Duruflé thought about basing his Requiem on Gregorian chant, he asked Le Guennant for advice, and gratefully acknowledged his understanding. In 1960, Duruflé dedicated a composition to Le Guennant, his Quatre Motets sur des thèmes grégoriens which were also based on chant.

In 1953, Le Guennant was awarded the honorary doctorate of the Pontifical Institute of Sacred Music in Rome.

== Writings ==
- 1947: Notes pour servir à la direction d’une Schola Grégorienne. OCLC 37375284
- 1948: Précis de rythmique grégorienne. OCLC 843569101
- 1988: Vade Mecum Paroissial de l'Accompagnateur Grégorien (posthumous) OL 2175971M
