= Music of the Shadow Hearts series =

Music of the Shadow Hearts video game series

The music of the Shadow Hearts role-playing video game series, developed by Japanese game company Sacnoth (later Nautilus), was primarily composed by Yoshitaka Hirota. Hirota collaborated on the original game with Masaharu Iwata, Yasunori Mitsuda and Ryo Fukuda. For its sequel Shadow Hearts: Covenant, Mitsuda returned and was joined by Kenji Ito and Tomoko Kobayashi. The final game From the New World saw Fukuda and Kobayashi return with newcomer Hirotomi Imoto. The Shadow Hearts series originated in the 1999 role-playing game Koudelka, the music of which was composed by company founder Hiroki Kikuta. Each game has received a soundtrack album, with Hirota also producing an arrange album of Shadow Hearts music.

Hirota's work on the Shadow Hearts series was directly influenced by his work as a sound designer. The first game's music encompassed a wide range of music genres, with Hirota not wanting it to sound like something from a movie. He also sought to emulate his Gothic-style sound design of Koudelka. The score for Covenant increased the dynamic and emotional elements while retaining the original game's musical style. For From the New World, the team incorporated ethnic elements to represent its setting in the Americas. The recurring theme "Icaro" was initially designed to represent the lead characters of Shadow Hearts, and went on to recur in arranged forms in its two sequels. Reception of the music has generally been positive.

== Series overview ==
Shadow Hearts is a series of role-playing video games for the PlayStation 2 (PS2) produced by Japanese studio Sacnoth, which was later rebranded as Nautilus. The Shadow Hearts series originated as a continuation of Koudelka, an RPG for the original PlayStation conceived by former Square staff member Hiroki Kikuta, who founded Sacnoth to develop the game. The tone of Koudelka inspired that game's art director Matsuzo Machida (originally credited as Matsuzo Itakura) to create the titular first game, which was set in the same universe as Koudelka. Machida took on the role of director. Shadow Hearts was followed by two sequels—Shadow Hearts: Covenant and the spin-off title Shadow Hearts: From the New World—before Nautilus was absorbed into Aruze in 2007 and ended video game production, ultimately ceasing to exist during corporate restructuring in 2009.

== Shadow Hearts ==
=== Shadow Hearts Original Soundtrack Plus1 ===
Shadow Hearts Original Soundtrack Plus1

Soundtrack album by Yoshitaka Hirota, Masaharu Iwata, Yasunori Mitsuda, Ryo Fukuda
- Released: June 18, 2001
- Genre: Video game soundtrack
- Length: 2:24:26
- Label: Scitron
- Producer: Yoshitaka Hirota

The music for the original Shadow Hearts was composed by Yoshitaka Hirota, who had worked on the sound design of Koudelka. Hirota worked on the game's music alongside Masaharu Iwata, Yasunori Mitsuda and Ryo Fukuda. Hirota had originally worked as a sound designer on Koudelka. Mitsuda was both an old friend and a frequent collaborator with Hirota on their earlier projects for Square, contributing around ten songs to the soundtrack. Iwata had previously worked on the score of Tactics Ogre, while Fukuda was brought in by Hirota based on their past experience working on the score for Sonic Shuffle. While creating the soundtrack, Hirota wanted to use his background in sound design to make a successor to the "Gothic" style he created for Koudelka's sound effects. He described the inspiration for the soundtrack as coming more from films than games, directly citing the Japanese film Shark Skin Man and Peach Hip Girl. He also attributed possible influence to the games Kowloon's Gate and Baroque, the latter composed by Iwata. Machida gave Hirota's team a basic outline of the game's setting and premise.

Hirota's intent was to make the soundtrack "beautiful yet destructive", not wanting players to think it was like a movie score. The soundtrack included over fifty songs, which was a large project for Hirota at this time. He included elements of punk, new wave industrial rock, techno, electronic rock and orchestra. His aim was to create "personal, future ethnic music". A track he later remembered fondly was the battle theme "near death experience", and the theme "qu" which he described as a mixture of ambient sampling and Asian musical elements. Upon first hearing the result, producer Jun Mihara was shocked, as to him the music sounded like a random jumble of genres somehow being fitted together. Despite the shock, he was impressed with the young team's efforts, which motivated him to make the game itself match these images.

The game's vocal elements had multiple contributors; the main theme "Icaro" and several additional vocals were provided by Kyoko Kishikawa, while the ending theme "Shadow Hearts" was sung by Hiroko Kasahara. "Icaro" was put together quickly for an internal demo. Hirota wanted the theme to be "short yet striking". Its use in the game's opening sequence where the main protagonist saves the main heroine was intended to show the game's focus on these two characters. Later versions of "Icaro" were used to connect back to that scene and its meaning. The lyrics of "Shadow Hearts" were written by James H. Woan, with lyrics in both Japanese and English. Track titles were also created by Woan.

A 2CD soundtrack album for the game, Shadow Hearts Original Soundtrack Plus1, was published by music label Scitron on June 18, 2001. A reprint of the album was released on January 19, 2005. RPGFan called the music "a score of a beauty and quality rarely seen in an OST, that easily stands among the best in recent memory", praising its ambience and unconventional orchestration, although they found some tracks overly dark. The reviewer ended by lauding Hirota's work on the album. Video Game Music Online gave the album a score of 4.5 stars out of 5. The reviewer, while calling the album in general "a mixed bag", praised the emotion and thematic variety displayed by the music. Particular praise went to the battle theme "Near Death Experience", main theme "Icaro", and the vocal theme "Shadow Hearts". His main criticism was towards tracks such as "But-Dad-Dead-Bed" and "Sweet Pillows", which were cited as either uninspired or poorly constructed. He finished by saying "anyone with a taste for adventure and creativity will enjoy this soundtrack significantly".

Reviewers of the game also praised the music. Gerald Villoria, writing for GameSpot, praised the soundtrack the audio's strongest point despite some repetition. David Smith of IGN praised the variety and quality of the soundtrack, though he felt Mitsuda's tracks were weaker than his other works. Patrick Gann of RPGFan described the soundtrack as "nothing short of brilliant", describing it as potentially the best RPG soundtrack of 2001.

=== Shadow Hearts II Original Soundtrack ===
Shadow Hearts II Original Soundtrack

Soundtrack album by Yoshitaka Hirota, Yasunori Mitsuda, Kenji Ito, Tomoko Kobayashi
- Released: March 24, 2004
- Genre: Video game soundtrack
- Length: 2:24:08
- Label: Team Entertainment
- Producer: Taku Kitahara

Composition for Shadow Hearts: Covenant, known in Japan as Shadow Hearts II, was led by Hirota. Mitsuda returned from the original Shadow Hearts, along with series newcomers Kenji Ito and Tomoko Kobayashi; Kobayashi, a staff member at Sacnoth, was responsible for writing some short story-related pieces. The soundtrack includes over sixty songs. Mitsuda contributed between five and six solo pieces, along with working on a few collaborative tracks. The music for the game, as included on the soundtrack album, was composed between June 2002 and the end of 2003.

According to sound director Hirotomi Imoto, he asked the composers to take the original sound for Shadow Hearts, deconstruct it and rebuild it. The composers used different tones for their tracks; Hirota created "dark" tracks, Mitsuda focused on melodies with a "beautiful face", and Ito's themes were "mental". Due to the game's shift in tone compared to the original, Hirota wanted a soundtrack that was more dynamic and emotional without surrendering the signature Shadow Hearts sound. Mitsuda had difficulty during early production as he wanted to adapt his music to better fit the Shadow Hearts universe, but at Hirota's insistence he maintained his own style which was fitted into the game's overall score.

Covenant was Ito's very first project for the PS2, his first time working with Hirota and Mitsuda, and the first time he ever collaborated on a major track, this being the final boss theme "The 3 Karma". "The 3 Karma" was co-composed by Hirota, Mitsuda and Ito. The piece came together after the three composers had a private meeting, and after the speed and tempo were set each was allowed to go in their own direction. Because of the battle's style, a limited number of instruments were used for the theme. During the recording process, there was a combination of scripted music and improvisations from the performers.

The previous game's main theme "Icaro" was included as a part of the soundtrack, with Hirota rearranging it while preserving its core musical notes. The ending theme "Getsurenka" was written by Hirota, with lyrics by Kumiko Hasegawa, and performed by Mio Isayama. "Getsurenka" was described by Machida as the "true feelings" of main heroine Karin. Its tone, according to the producer Asako Oikawa, was decided upon once he and Machida had finalized the game's ending. The lyrics were intended to be the words heroine Karin Koenig wanted to say to Yuri but was unable to before that point. Upon receiving the request, Hasegawa was inspired by their combined effect with a near-full moon outside her home to turn off all the lights and write the lyrics by moonlight; the song was written as a love poem. Isayama was so impressed by the emotion within the lyrics that she "sang from [her] heart".

A 2CD soundtrack album, Shadow Hearts II Original Soundtrack, was published by Team Entertainment on March 24, 2004. Video Game Music Online was very positive, citing the battle themes as one of the album's strengths and giving praise to the environmental and dungeon themes. He enjoyed Mitsuda's contributions despite their low number, but felt Ito's use of electronica made his tracks contrast against the rest of the album. Jesse Jones of RPGFan was generally positive, with tracks such as "Astaroth" and the ending theme receiving particular praise, but he felt that several tracks felt lacking compared to the first game. Some tracks including "Town of Twilight" suffered in Jones's eyes due to their overuse in Covenant.

Jeremy Parish of 1UP.com praised the soundtrack, positively mentioning Mitsuda's contributions. GamePro positively noted that the music "gets dramatic during every battle", and Bethany Massimilla of GameSpot found it enjoyable and praised the battle and main themes. IGN's Jeremy Dunham felt that the soundtrack was not as good as the first game, but still called it a strength of the game. Mark Marrow of PALGN said the score "does a nice job of fitting in with the context of each area", and RPGFan's Mike Bracken echoed Dunham's opinion on the score's weakness compared to Shadow Hearts despite saying that anyone interested in game music should get the soundtrack album.

=== Shadow Hearts: From the New World Original Soundtrack ===
Shadow Hearts: From the New World Original Soundtrack

Soundtrack album by Yoshitaka Hirota, Tomoko Kobayashi, Ryo Fukuda, Hirotomi Imoto
- Released: August 24, 2005
- Genre: Video game soundtrack
- Length: 2:27:17
- Label: Team Entertainment
- Producer: Taku Kitahara

Composition for From the New World was once more led by Hirota, who was joined by Fukuda, Kobayashi (credited as Tomoko Imoto), and newcomer Hirotomi Imoto, the latter also acting as sound director. Due to the game's setting of the Americas, the soundtrack made heavy use of ethnic instruments and vocals, with the overall theme being "thirst"; this was meant to evoke both the desert environment and people's thirst for connections. For the lyrics, the team used both Latin and Italian. The production of the soundtrack, as with the rest of the game, was on a tight schedule and caused trouble for some members.

Before starting on the score, Hirota researched the cultures of Native American tribes, seeing a shared belief in coexistence with the world that informed his concept for the game's music. After his research, he came up with the concept of ancient instruments fusing with modern electronic elements, which would become the main theme of the score. Hirota handled the majority of the tracks, with his first completed piece being the theme "Dream Catcher", which played during a key story sequence. Fukada, who previously played a minor role for the last two Shadow Hearts titles, was invited by Hirota to contribute solo tracks to the score. Fukada acted as both composer and arranger for the game. A number of ethnic instruments were used throughout the score, including a didgeridoo and a cajón. Their use tied into the game's setting of the "new world".

As with Covenant, the series' main theme "Icaro" was used in an arranged form; this time it appeared in the opening theme "Great Ghost Dance". The choral work for the game was led by Akiko Shikata. During her work on the chorus segments, including the spirit sequences, she had to redo several of her tracks so they would come off as primal, with one piece needing to be redone when Imoto rung her up and complained that it sounded like a "men's festival"; she adjusted it so it sounded more ceremonial. For one early segment set inside a theater, Shikata used the aria "D'Oreste, d'Ajace" from the opera Idomeneo by Wolfgang Amadeus Mozart. She picked the area due to its dark tone, consequently working it into the environment. The chorus work included the use of Tuvan throat singing for some tracks including "Dream Catcher" and "Great Ghost Dance". The game's ending theme "Spread My Wings" was composed by Hirota, and written and sung by Takehara Tomoaki of the indie funk band Taste of Chocolate.

A 2CD soundtrack album, Shadow Hearts: From the New World Original Soundtrack, was released by Team Entertainment on August 24, 2005. Video Game Music Online was generally positive about the album, enjoying several tracks including the "Fusion" themes of heroine Shania and different environment themes due to fitting their locations fairly well. The ending theme "Spread My Wings" was criticised as inferior to the previous theme songs. Summarising the album, the reviewer said: "Overall, it's a good album. Not great, since many of the themes have the potential to become very repetitive after repeated listenings." Wilson felt that the soundtrack was much stronger than that of Covenant though still inferior to the first game, and despite an uneven start the album was generally strong.

Massimilla said that the score "remains oddly compelling in the Shadow Hearts style". Dunham was highly positive about the game's soundtrack, giving it high praise in contrast to his opinions on the voice acting. Tristan Kalogeropoulos of PALGN praised the music, saying it matched the game's tone and tied the action together. Gann said that, despite some "redundant" town themes, the soundtrack was one of the game's strongest elements despite disliking "Spread My Wings".

== Other albums ==
=== Koudelka Original Soundtrack ===
Koudelka Original Soundtrack

Soundtrack album by Hiroki Kikuta
- Released: December 1, 1999
- Genre: Video game soundtrack
- Length: 1:03:26
- Label: Pony Canyon & Scitron Digital Contents
- Producer: Yoshihiro Ohno & Takao Noma

The music for Koudelka was composed by Kikuta, who had previously composed the scores of Secret of Mana, Seiken Densetsu 3 and Soukaigi for Square; he wrote the music alongside his roles as the game's director, producer and writer. Kikuta found composing the score the easiest part of development due to mainly working on his own. His concept for the musical elements of Koudelka were created alongside the setting and narrative. The score was arranged by Kikuta and Nick Ingman.

To compose most of the game's tracks, Kikuta used Atari Notator sound software. While he found the lack of compression an issue, the better sequencing compared to the software he used for earlier games was very useful when creating the score for the CGI cutscenes. Due to there being a smaller amount of music than the average RPG, the score was completed within six months. Rather than having looping tracks like his earlier work with Square, the soundtrack of Koudelka used ambient sounds and short tracks related to cutscenes outside of battle themes. The game featured influences from church music. The opening vocal theme "Requiem" was performed by Catherine Bott, while the ending theme "Ubi Caritas et amor"—taken from a larger composition by Maurice Duruflé—was performed by the London Oratory School. Excerpts from the score were used in a CD drama adaptation of the game released in November 1999 by Scitron Digital Contents.

The soundtrack album for the game, Koudelka Original Soundtrack, was published on December 1, 1999, by Pony Canyon and Scitron Digital Contents, featuring over an hour of music across 34 tracks. The album included all tracks from the game, and live versions of three of the battle themes arranged by Naoya Akimoto. Harry Simons of Video Game Music Online gave a mixed opinion of the album, praising several tracks but finding the rest either lacking or poorly written. RPGFan's Patrick Gann was highly positive about the game's music aside from the live tracks, which he referred to as "a bomb".

Reviewers of the games were divided about the soundtrack. GameSpot's Ike Sato called the soundtrack "simply amazing", and Jake Alley of RPGamer enjoyed most aspects of the music while finding the battle themes clashed with the game's tone. David Zdyrko of IGN was unimpressed by the environmental music and called the battle themes "very worst... [that have] ever been used in a console role-playing game." Ken Chu, writing for RPGFan, found the soundtrack disappointing compared to Kikuta's previous work. Dutch magazine Power Unlimited was particularly scathing, calling the music "a disaster".

=== Near Death Experience: Shadow Hearts Arrange Tracks ===
Near Death Experience: Shadow Hearts Arrange Tracks

Soundtrack album by Yoshitaka Hirota, Yasunori Mitsuda, Kenji Ito, Tomoko Imoto
- Released: August 24, 2005
- Genre: Video game soundtrack
- Length: 49:55
- Label: Team Entertainment
- Producer: Hirotomi Imoto

Planning for the arrange album Near Death Experience began as Hirota was producing the soundtrack of From the New World. The album's title derived from his opinion that senses were interconnected. The main wish of Hirota was to rid himself of the practical side of music development, which had previously restrained his creative abilities for the Shadow Hearts series and involved working with multiple composers who stuck to their own styles due to time constraints. For the remixes, Hirota decided to experiment with his own style while retaining the core of each track. The album featured tracks from all three Shadow Hearts games, covering compositions by Hirota, Mitsuda, Ito and Imoto. Each also provided arrangements; Hirota handled five out of the eleven tracks, while the others worked on two each.

The album was published by Team Entertainment on August 24, 2005. These four also arranged the tracks. The two music critics who reviewed the title had split opinions on the album despite generally liking the tracks included. Video Game Music Online's Eduardo Friedman called the album "fantastic", particularly noting arrangements for the titular battle theme from the first game and Hirota's arrangement of "The 3 Karma". Mike Wilson of RPGFan ranked the album as a 6.5 out of 10. While he enjoyed some arrangements, he felt there was a general lack of effort put into the arrangements. A track criticised by both was Mitsuda's arrangement of Covenant boss theme "Astaroth", which they felt was inferior to the original.

No.	Title	Writer(s)	Japanese title	Length
1.	"n.d.e / near death experience - Muddy Water edit"	Yoshitaka Hirota	"n.d.e / near death experience - Muddy Water edit"	3:54
2.	"Astaroth - 8-minute note mix"	Yasunori Mitsuda	"Astaroth - 8-minute note mix"	4:53
3.	"The Wheel Of Fortune - Fortuna"	Tomoko Imoto	"The Wheel Of Fortune - Fortuna"	5:35
4.	"Never Ending Sadness - Pain edit"	Kenji Ito	"Never Ending Sadness - Pain edit"	4:12
5.	"Town of Twilight - Ambient Remix"	Yasunori Mitsuda	"夕暮れの街 - Ambient Remix"	3:53
6.	"Ala Of Sacrum - Spirit of the Air"	Yoshitaka Hirota	"Ala Of Sacrum - Spirit of the Air"	5:08
7.	"Deep In Coma - minimal work"	Yoshitaka Hirota	"Deep In Coma - minimal work"	4:32
8.	"Asian Parfait - Jasmine"	Tomoko Imoto	"Asian Parfait - 茉莉花"	3:50
9.	"Grey Memories - Floating edit"	Kenji Ito	"灰色の記憶 - Floating edit"	4:33
10.	"The 3 Karma - Cogito, ergo sum"	Yoshitaka Hirota	"The 3 Karma - Cogito, ergo sum"	6:04
11.	""Sphere -qu-" - Sacred Shrine edit"	Yoshitaka Hirota	""球-qu-" - Sacred Shrine edit"	3:21
