= Tota pulchra es =

Catholic prayer written in the fourth century

Tota pulchra es is a Catholic prayer written in the fourth century. The title means "You are completely beautiful" (referring to the Virgin Mary). It speaks of her Immaculate Conception. Some of its verses are used as antiphons for the Feast of the Immaculate Conception. It takes some text from the book of Judith, and other text from the Song of Songs, specifically 4:7.

Composers to set the prayer to music include Robert Schumann, Anton Bruckner, Pablo Casals, Maurice Duruflé, Guillaume du Fay, Grzegorz Gerwazy Gorczycki, Heinrich Isaac, James MacMillan., Jose Mauricio Nunes Garcia, and Ola Gjeilo.

== Text ==
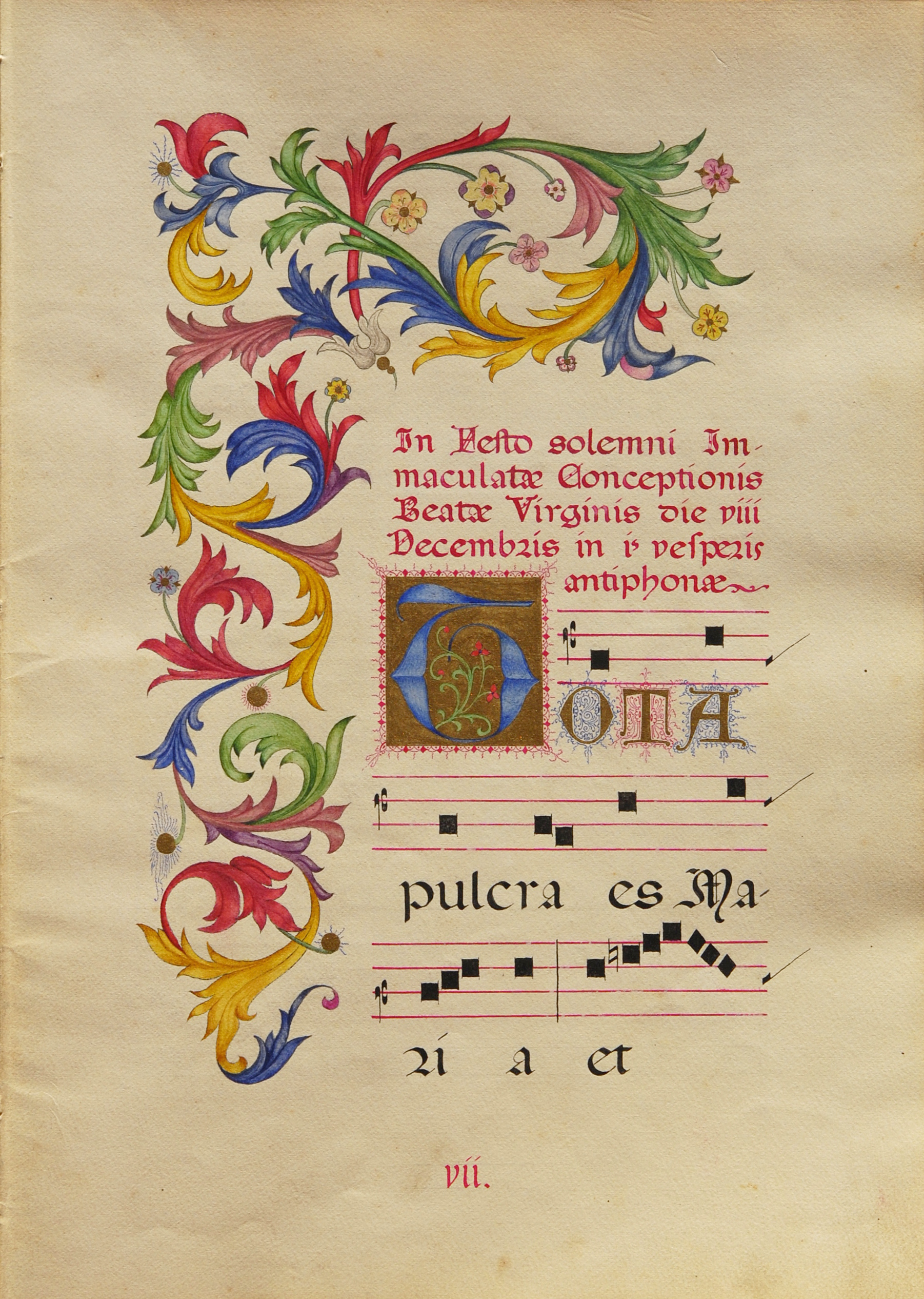

Tota pulchra

Tota pulchra es, Maria.
Et macula originalis non est in Te.
Tu gloria Ierusalem.
Tu laetitia Israel.
Tu honorificentia populi nostri.
Tu advocata peccatorum.
O Maria,
Virgo prudentissima.
Mater clementissima.
Ora pro nobis.
Intercede pro nobis.
Ad Dominum Iesu Christum.

Translation:

You are all beautiful, Mary,
and the original stain [of sin] is not in you.
You are the glory of Jerusalem,
you are the joy of Israel,
you give honour to our people.
You are an advocation of sinners.
O Mary,
Virgin most intelligent,
Mother most merciful.
Pray for us,
Plead for us,
To the Lord Jesus Christ.

== Music ==
Maurice Duruflé set the prayer in Latin as No. 2 of his Quatre Motets sur des thèmes grégoriens.

In 1783, José Mauricio Nunes Garcia wrote the antiphon, "Tota pulchra Es". This was his first surviving work as it dates back the furthest when he was 16 years old.
