= Requiem (Duruflé) =

Piece of music by Maurice Duruflé

- by Maurice Duruflé
- Beginning of the second movement, Kyrie, in the organ version
- Opus: 9
- Text: Requiem
- Language: Latin
- Based on: Gregorian plainchant
- Dedication: To the memory of his father
- Movements: 9

The Requiem, Op. 9, is a 1947 (revised 1961) setting of the Latin Requiem by Maurice Duruflé for a solo baritone, mezzo-soprano, mixed choir, and organ, or orchestra with organ. The thematic material is mostly taken from the Mass for the Dead in Gregorian chant. The Requiem was first published in 1948 by Durand in an organ version.

== History ==
Maurice Duruflé was among French composers commissioned in May 1941 by the collaborationist Vichy regime to write extended works for a monetary award, such as 10,000 francs for a symphonic poem, 20,000 for a symphony, and 30,000 for an opera. Duruflé, commissioned to compose a symphonic poem, decided to compose a Requiem and was still working on it in 1944 when the regime collapsed. He completed it in September 1947.

He set the Latin text of the Requiem Mass, omitting certain parts in the tradition of Gabriel Fauré's Requiem and structuring it in nine movements. At the time of the commission, he was working on an organ suite using themes from Gregorian chants. He incorporated his sketches for that work into the Requiem, which uses numerous themes from the Gregorian "Mass for the Dead". Nearly all the thematic material in the work comes from chant. Duruflé scored the work for a solo voice in the central movement, Pie Jesu, and a mixed choir, accompanied by organ or orchestra. The composer dedicated the Requiem to the memory of his father.

The Requiem was published in 1948 by the French publishing house Durand, first issued in a version for SATB choir and organ. Duruflé demanded payment for the commissioned work and received 30,000 francs, instead of the 10,000 of his commission, because of the complex nature of his work and inflation during that time.

== Structure and scoring ==
Incipit of the Gregorian chant introit for a Requiem Mass, from the Liber Usualis

Duruflé structured the work in nine movements:

1. Introit (Requiem aeternam)
2. Kyrie eleison
3. Offertory (Domine Jesu Christe), choir and baritone solo
4. Sanctus and Benedictus
5. Pie Jesu, mezzo-soprano solo, optional solo cello
6. Agnus Dei
7. Communion (Lux aeterna)
8. Libera me, choir and baritone solo
9. In paradisum

The work is for SATB choir with brief mezzo-soprano and baritone solos. It exists in three versions: one for organ alone (with solo for cello ad libitum); one for organ with string orchestra and optional trumpets, harp, and timpani; and one for organ and full orchestra.

Like Fauré in his Requiem, Duruflé's omits most of the liturgical Dies irae, using only the Pie Jesu. He includes Libera me and In Paradisum, from the burial service, again like Fauré, focused on calmness and a meditative character. The central movement, Pie Jesu, has the only solo for the mezzo-soprano.

== Instrumentation ==
The full-orchestra version is scored for 3 flutes (2nd and 3rd doubling piccolo), 2 oboes (2nd doubling 2nd English horn), English horn, 2 clarinets, bass clarinet, 2 bassoons, 4 French horns, 3 trumpets, 3 trombones, tuba, timpani, cymbals, bass drum, tamtam, celesta, harp, organ, and strings (violins, violas, cellos, and double basses).

The reduced-orchestra version is scored for 3 trumpets, timpani, harp, organ, and strings (violins, violas, cellos, and double basses). The organ part used in the reduced version is different from the organ part used in the version for choir and organ.

== Discography ==
- Guy Janssens, A history of the Requiem – Part III, Laudantes Consort, Benoît Mernier, Organ – CD: Cypres CYP 1654, 2006 (with Bruckner's Requiem)
- Stetson University Concert Choir, Requiem, Alan Raines Conducting, Boyd Jones Organ – CD: Clear Note 74390, 2008. Publisher's store; Album info (archived)
- Requiem Æternam, The Choir of Somerville College, Oxford (David Crown, conductor; Tristan Mitchard, organ), Stone Records 5060192780208, 2012 (with Robin Milford’s Mass for Five Voices)
- Duruflé Requiem & Four Motets; Ann Murray, mezzo-soprano; Thomas Allen, baritone; Thomas Trotter, organ; Corydon Singers; English Chamber Orchestra; Matthew Best, conductor. CD: Hyperion Records Limited CDA66191, recorded October 1985
- Duruflé Requiem * Quatre Motets * Messe Cum Jubilo; Westminster Cathedral Choir / James O'Donnell; Hyperion CDA66757, recorded on 22–24 June, 6–8 July 1994
- Houston Chamber Choir, Duruflé: Complete Choral Works; Robert Simpson, Conductor; Cecilia Duarte, mezzo-soprano; Eduardo Tercero, baritone; Ken Cowan, organ; Norman Fischer, cello. CD: Signum Records, SIGCD571. Released on May 4, 2019. Recipient of the 2020 Grammy Award for Best Choral Performance.
- Duruflé: Requiem; Choir of St. John's College, Cambridge; Organ: Stephen Cleobury; Conducted by George Guest; Baritone: Christopher Keyte, Treble: Robert King.

== Cited sources ==
- Coghlan, Alexandra (2016). "Duruflé Requiem". Gramophone.
- Frazier, James E. (2007). "Chapter Sixteen: The Vichy Commissions / Chapter Seventeen: The Requiem". Maurice Duruflé: The Man and His Music. University of Rochester Press. pp. 156–180. ISBN 978-1-58-046227-3.
