= Frédéric Blanc =

French composer and organist (born 1967)

- Born: 1967 (age 58–59); Bordeaux, France
- Education: Conservatoire de Toulouse; Conservatoire de Bordeaux
- Occupations: Organist; composer; academic teacher
- Organizations: Notre-Dame d'Auteuil; International Altenberg Organ Academy for Improvisation; Association Maurice et Marie-Madeleine Duruflé

Frédéric Blanc (born 1967) is a French composer, organist and improvisor. The last student of Marie-Madeleine Duruflé, he is based as titular organist of Notre-Dame d'Auteuil in Paris. He has played concerts and given masterclasses internationally, especially in the United States. He is focused on the French organ tradition and improvisation.

== Life ==
Born in Bordeaux in 1967, Blanc first studied law for a year, then organ at the conservatories of Toulouse and Bordeaux with André Fleury, Marie-Claire Alain, Pierre Cogen and, from 1991, with Marie-Madeleine Duruflé. He lived in the Duruflés' apartmentment after they died, as custodian of their estate, including manuscripts, documents, correspondence, photographs and their library.

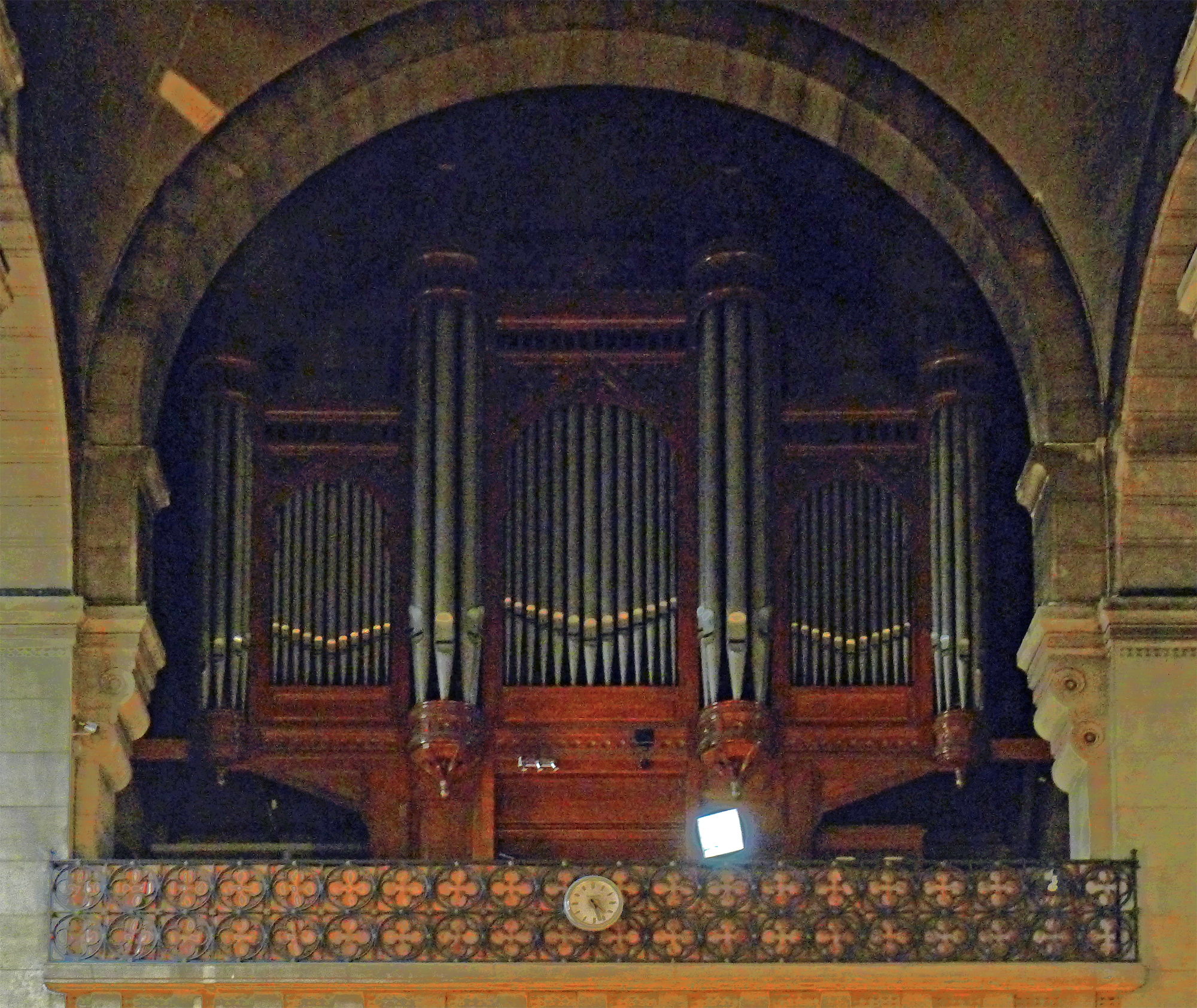
Organ of Notre-Dame d'Auteuil built by Cavaillé-Coll

From 1987 to 1995, he was assistant organist at the Basilica of Saint-Sernin, Toulouse, and from 1993 to 1999 lecturer in organ at the Conservatoire de Bordeaux. He won second prize at the Grand Prix de Chartres in 1996, In 1997, he won the Grand Prix d'improvisation of the international organ competition Concours internationaux de la Ville de Paris. Since 1999, Blanc has been titular organist at Notre-Dame d'Auteuil in Paris which features a Cavaillé-Coll organ. In August 2003, he was a lecturer at the International Altenberg Organ Academy for Improvisation. He is also a member of the organ commission of Paris and a member of the commission for non-historic organs in the music department of the French Ministry of Culture.

Blanc has held organ masterclasses, for example at the Royal Academy of Music in London and increasingly at U.S. universities, such as Valparaiso University, Indiana, Stanford University, California, Hope College in Holland, Michigan, Northwestern University in Evanston, Illinois, Southern Methodist University in Dallas, the Curtis Institute of Music in Philadelphia, University of Michigan and Arizona State University.

== Competitions ==
- 1996: Second prize at the Grand Prix de Chartres
- 1996: Audience prize at the organ competition of the Internationale Orgelwoche Nürnberg
- 1997: Grand Prix d'improvisation, at the international organ competition Concours internationaux de la Ville de Paris

== Publications ==
- Frédéric Blanc, François Sabatier (ed.): André Fleury (1903–1995). In: L'Orgue: Cahiers et memoirs No. 55. Association des Amis de l'Orgue, Paris 1996.
- Maurice Duruflé – Mémoires et écrits 1936–1986. Éditions Séguier, Biarritz 2005, ISBN 2-84049-411-6.
- Berceuse à la mémoire de Louis Vierne. Reconstruction of improvisations by Pierre Cochereau. Éditions Chantraine/Musikverlag Dr. J. Butz, 1997.

== Recordings ==
- Blanc, Frederic (1991), Messe improvisée (in German), Motette-Ursina-Schallplattenverlag, OCLC 724859485
- Blanc, Frederic (1990), Les grandes orgues Cavaillé-Coll de la Basilique Saint-Sernin de Toulouse 1889–1989 (in no linguistic content), Ursina Motette, OCLC 25129560
- Live Improvisations. 1999, Aeolus AE-10091, CD (Organs of Chartres Cathedral, Bonn Minster, Angoulême Cathedral and Saint-Sernin, Toulouse). OCLC 903381662
- Hommage à André Fleury Vol. 2. 2002, Aeolus AE-10151, CD (Église Notre-Dame-d'Auteuil). OCLC 903126822
- Improvisations pour le temps pascal, Improvisations on Easter themes, Baroque Notes 2003, CD (Aeolian Skinner organ of the Perkins Chapel of the Dallas University). OCLC 62748589
- "BLANC, F.: Improvisation sur deux themes donnes". Naxos Digital Services US Inc. OCLC 885057750.
- "BLANC, F.: Improvisation sur le nom de Colette Morillon". Naxos Digital Services US Inc. 2012. OCLC 885053698.
