= Léon Destroismaisons =

Léon Destroismaisons (2 March 1890, Quebec City – 3 February 1980, Saint-Pacôme, Quebec) was a Canadian priest, organist, composer, and music educator.

== Life and career ==
Born in Quebec City, Destroismaisons began his music studies while completing his preparation for ordination as a priest. He was educated as a musician at Collège Ste-Anne-de-la-Pocatière where he later taught organ and harmony from 1914 to 1925 and again from 1929 to 1965. He also studied organ and piano privately with Henri Gagnon.

In 1925 Destroismaisons was awarded a scholarship which enabled him to pursue studies in Paris over a four-year period. His teachers in France included Georges Caussade (harmony and counterpoint), Vincent d'Indy (composition), Marcel Dupré (organ), and Auguste Le Guennant (Gregorian chant). In 1929 he received a diploma from the Gregorian Institute of Paris; and then returned to Canada to resume teaching at the Collège Ste-Anne-de-la-Pocatière. In 1931 he began teaching course at Université Laval as well.

Destroismaisons was a frequent organ recitalist, and notably performed 30 inaugural concerts on newly built organs at churches throughout the provinces of Quebec and New Brunswick. WIth Louis-Philippe Morneau he prepared the hymn and canticle collection Manuel de chants sacrés (1940). His compositional output included a cantata, works for organ, and several sacred songs and hymns.
