= Notre Père =

Sacred motet by Maurice Duruflé

- Sacred motet by Maurice Duruflé
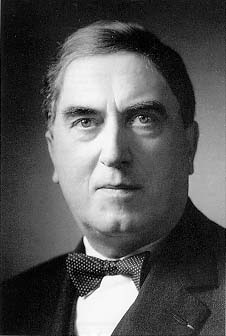
- The composer c. 1962
- English: Our Father
- Opus: 14
- Text: Lord's Prayer
- Language: French
- Composed: 1976
- Dedication: Marie-Madeleine Duruflé
- Published: 1977/78
- Scoring: voice; organ; SATB a cappella

Notre Père (Our Father), Op. 14, is a sacred motet by Maurice Duruflé, setting the Lord's Prayer in French as a sacred motet. It was published for voice and organ in 1977, and for a four-part choir a cappella in 1978, by Éditions Durand. Durufle dedicated the composition to his wife, Marie-Madeleine Duruflé. It is his last published composition, and his only work suitable for congregational singing.

== History ==
Duruflé, who was organist in at Saint-Étienne-du-Mont in Paris and also director of the Gregorian Institute of Paris, set the Lord's Prayer in French as Notre Père for liturgical use. It was a commission from a priest at Saint-Etienne. It is his only work suitable for congregational singing, as requested by the Second Vatican Council. He regretted the decline of Gregorian chant in Latin which had influenced his earlier compositions. He wrote first a version for unison male voices with organ, then a transcription for a four-part choir a cappella. Both versions were published by Éditions Durand, dedicated to his wife, Marie-Madeleine Duruflé, the unison version in 1977 and the choral version in 1978. It became his last published composition, which appeared also with an English translation.

== Music ==
The melody of Notre Père is chant-like, although not original Gregorian chant. Like chant, it is in free motion and with narrow ambitus, and the beginning uses the same notes as the chant melody. It is written in reverential approach to the prayer, with a subtle treatment of harmony used to interpret the significant text in homophony. The composition is in F major, mostly in triple meter but shifting to 2/4 time when the natural flow of the text demands it. The four-part setting is accessible, and the unison version can also be performed by children's choirs.
