= Lisa Shihoten =

American musician

Lisa Shihoten (born in Chicago, Illinois) is an American violin soloist, chamber musician and teacher.

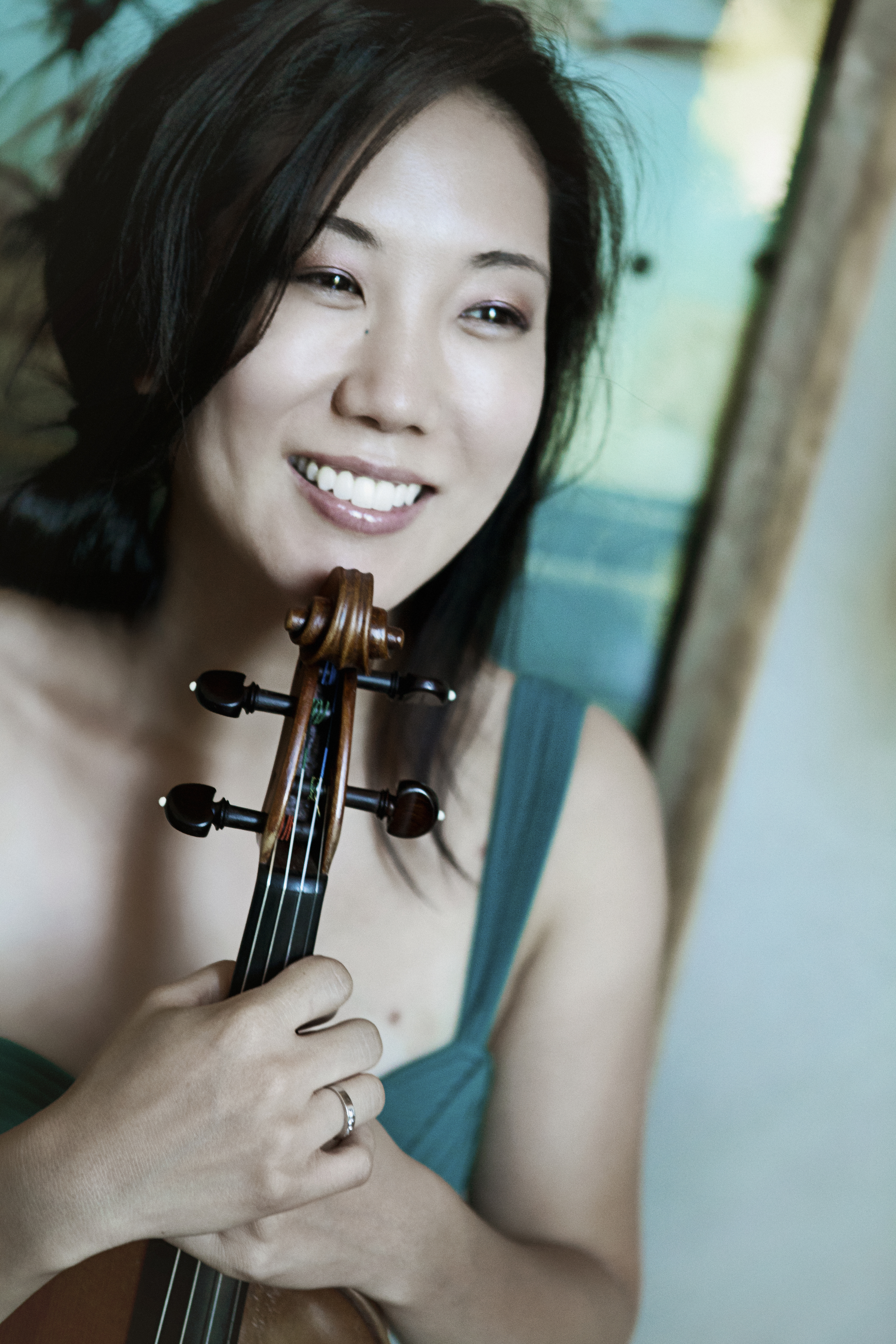
American Violinist – Lisa Shihoten

A member of the critically acclaimed Jupiter Symphony Chamber Players, Shihoten is an active and significant presence in New York City's classical music scene. A graduate of The Juilliard School and Yale University, she made her Avery Fisher Hall debut in 1995 performing Bruch’s Scottish Fantasy with The Juilliard Orchestra under Kurt Masur. As a recitalist and chamber musician, Shihoten has appeared at the Aspen Music Festival, Verbier Festival, Ravinia Festival, and in Caramoor’s Rising Stars series. She has won the Grand Prize at the Marcia Polayes National Violin Competition and the Aspen Music Festival's Nakamichi Competition, as well as top prizes from the National Foundation for Advancement in the Arts and the Seventeen (magazine)/General Motors National Competition. Her former teachers include Dorothy DeLay, Masao Kawasaki and Peter Oundjian.

She is married to organist Ken Cowan and was teaching violin at Princeton University, also a guest instructor at the Betty Haag Academy of Music in Chicago, where she works with her childhood violin teacher, Betty Haag-Kuhnke.

She is currently a faculty violin instructor at the Michael P. Hammond Preparatory Program at Rice University in Houston.
