= Betty Haag =

American music educator

Betty Haag-Kuhnke, commonly referred to as Betty Haag, is an American music educator.

== Life ==
She received Bachelor and Master of Music degrees from Indiana University Bloomington where she was the recipient of the Goodbody Fellowship and the Performer's Certificate. After graduation, she began playing professionally with the Atlanta Symphony. She later taught violin at Earlham College.

Haag introduced the Suzuki method to the Arlington Heights Public Schools in Illinois, and worked directly with Shinichi Suzuki in Matsumoto, Japan. While in Japan, she supervised the recordings for Suzuki in the String Class by Zahitilla (which were completed in Chicago). She has since taught Suzuki Pedagogy at De Paul University, Stanford University, and Northwestern University and presented workshop demonstrations in Germany, China, Portugal, Australia and throughout the United States.

She was named the 1994 Illinois String Teachers Association's Outstanding Studio Teacher of the Year and has been recognized by the National Foundation for Advancement in the Arts. As recipient of the John F. Kennedy Center Award for Programs for Children and Youth, she was honored by having her students appear at the 37th Annual Kennedy Center Achievement Awards presentation.

In addition to her work as director of the Betty Haag Academy of Violin Studies, Haag serves as a faculty member at the Porto International Festival in Portugal and the Music Academy at Schloss Ort-Gmunden, Austria.

== Prominent students ==
- Rachel Barton Pine (Soloist and recording artist)
- Stephanie Jeong (Associate concertmaster of the Chicago Symphony Orchestra)
- Roddy Chong (Touring musician for Shania Twain and Trans-Siberian Orchestra)
- Gina DiBello (First violin in the Chicago Symphony Orchestra)
- Elisa Barston (Principal Second violin of the Seattle Symphony)
- Karen Haley Foster (Retired violinist of the Vancouver Symphony Orchestra)
- Kiju Joh (Second violin in the Houston Symphony)
- Kristine Whitson (Second violin in the Los Angeles Philharmonic)
- Lauren Speeth (First violin in the Peninsula Symphony)
- Jacqueline Fisher (First violin in the Rockford Symphony Orchestra)
- Sang Mee Lee (Violin and viola faculty at Weber State University)
- Naomi Culp (Violin faculty at DePaul University)
- David Perry (Violin faculty at University of Wisconsin–Madison)
- Lisa Shihoten (Violin soloist, member of Jupiter Symphony Chamber Players, and violin faculty at Rice University)
- Karyn Macfarlane (Former Associate Concertmaster of the Charleston Symphony Orchestra)
- Alan Molina (First violin in the New Zealand Symphony Orchestra and former Principal Second Violin in the Charleston Symphony Orchestra)
- Gallia Kastner (Concertmaster of the American Youth Symphony)
