= Notre-Dame d'Auteuil =

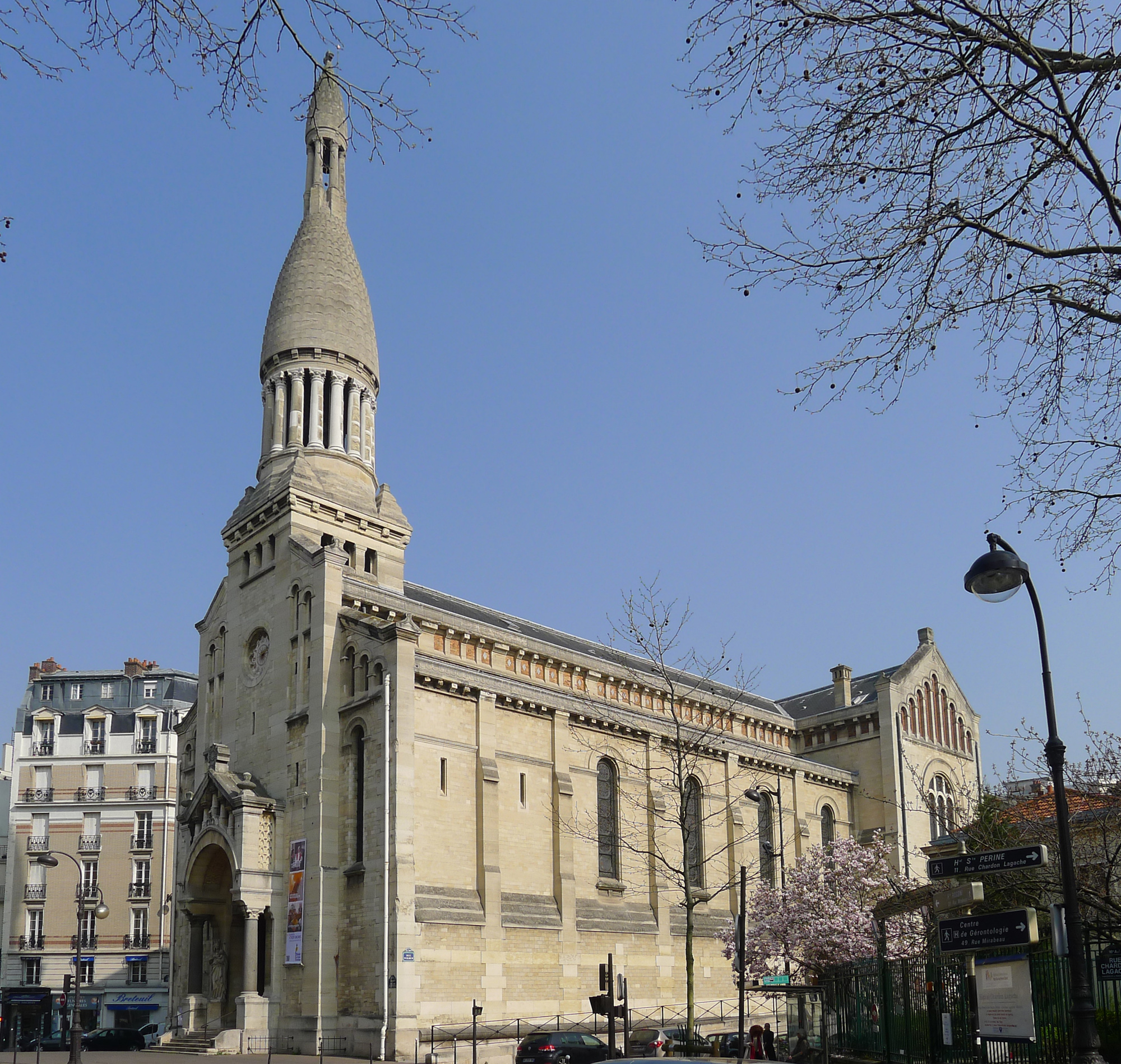
- Notre-Dame d'Auteuil
- 48°50′50″N 2°16′10″E
- Location: 16th arrondissement of Paris
- Country: France
- Denomination: Roman Catholic Church

Notre-Dame d'Auteuil (French pronunciation: [nɔtʁ.dam do.tœj]) is a Roman Catholic parish church on the Auteuil hill in the 16th arrondissement of Paris.

== History ==
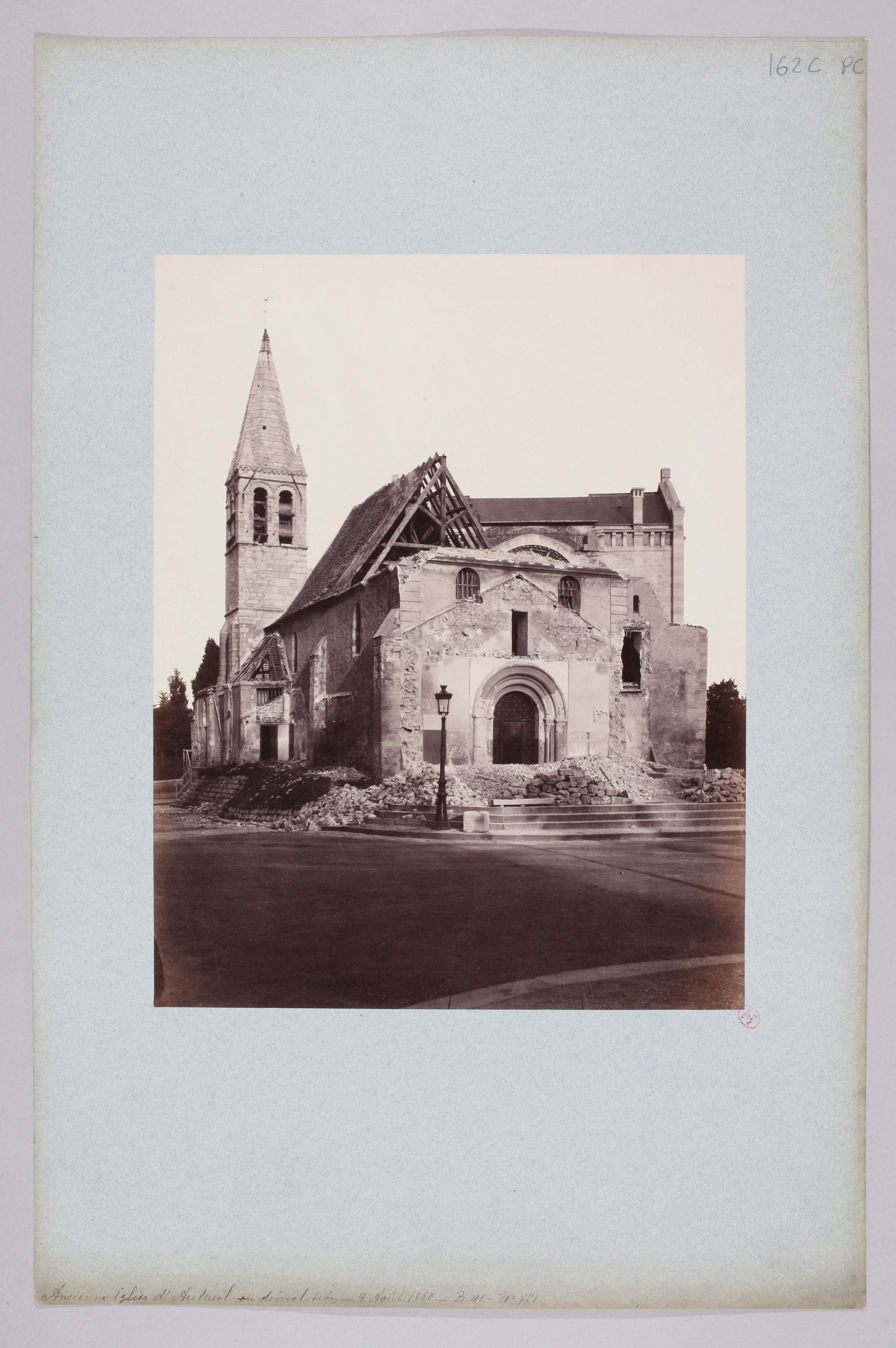
The Old Church in 1880

Before the French Revolution Auteuil was best known for its vineyards, the property of the noble families of the fief of Auteiul. A Romanesque church was built there in the 11th century, and was replaced by a new church in the 14th century. Auteuil was not merged into Paris until 1860.

The present church was built between 1877 and 1892 in a blend of the Romanesque and Byzantine styles, a combination very popular in the period. They architect was Joseph Auguste Émile Vaudremer (1829–1914), the architect of the diocese, whose other projects included the church Saint-Pierre de Montrouge and La Santé Prison.

== Exterior ==
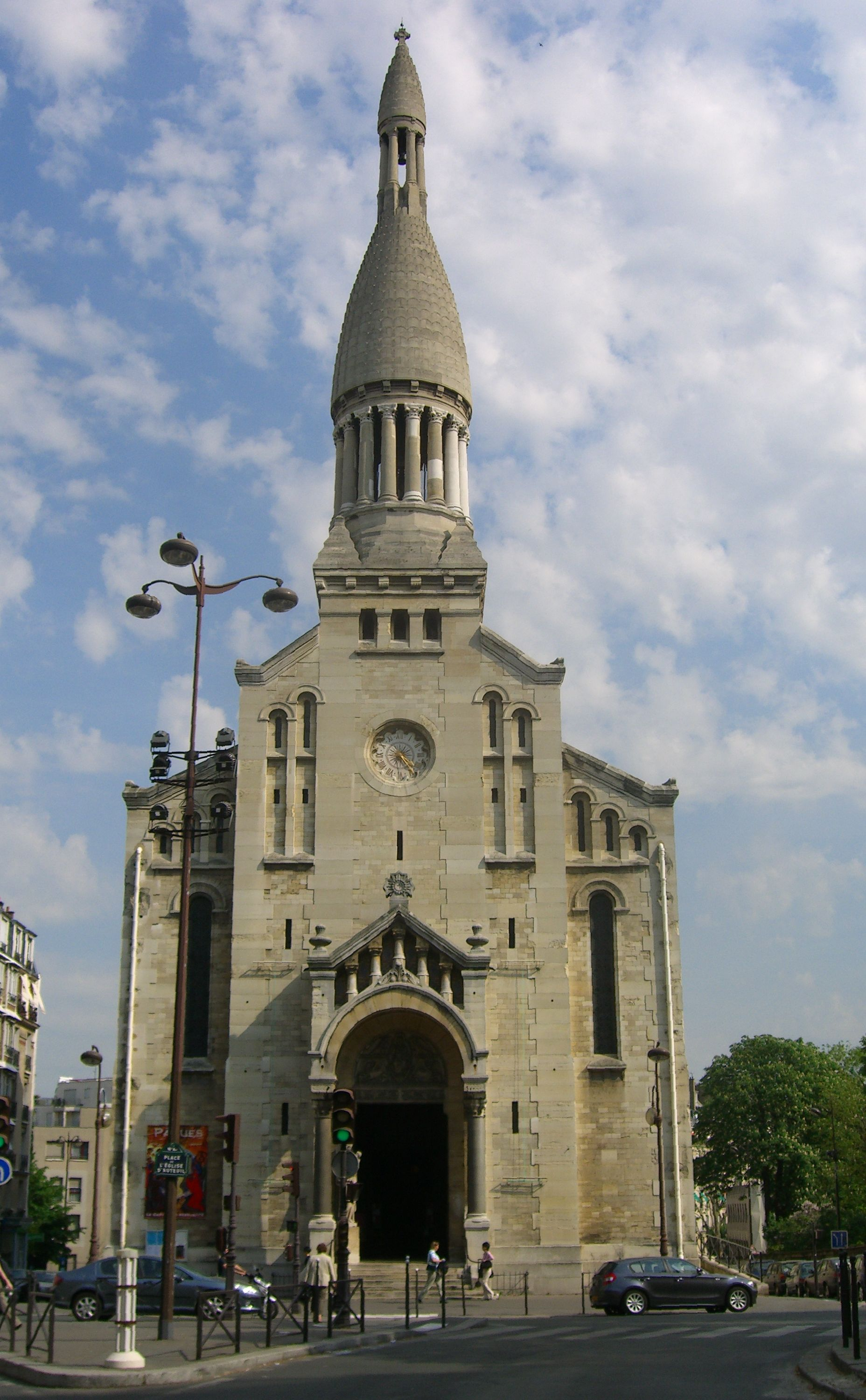
Facade and tower

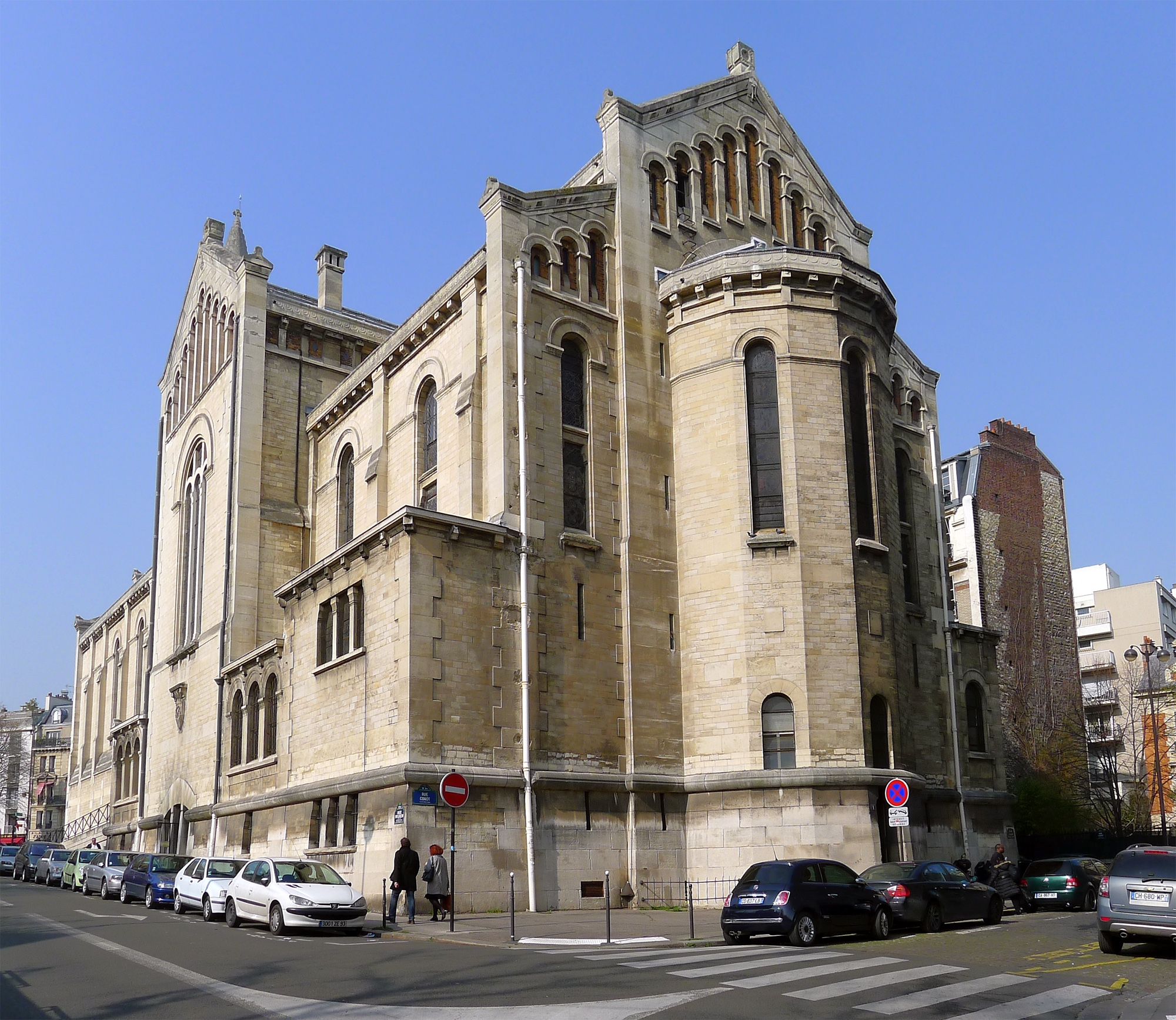
South side

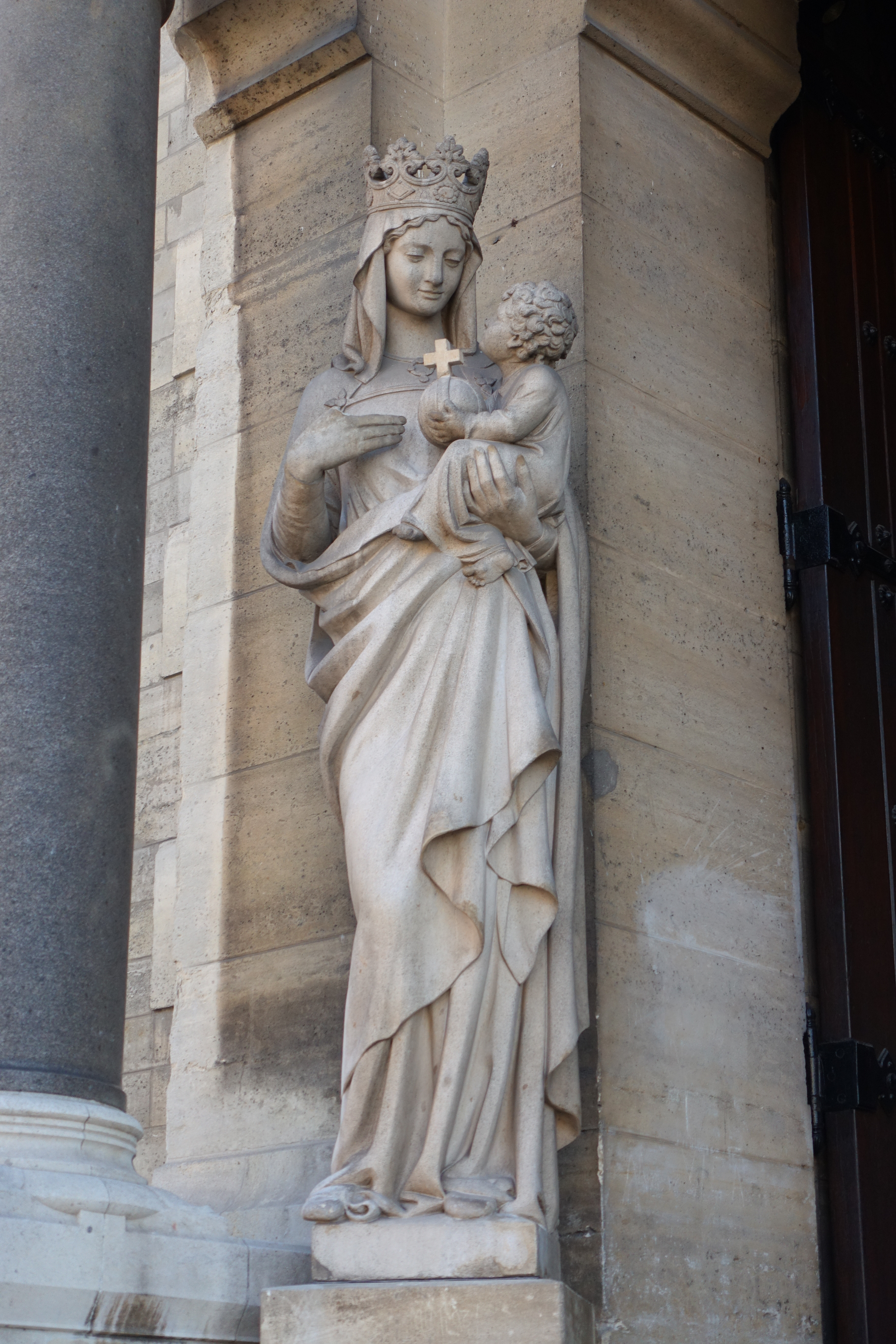
Virgin and child sculpture at portal

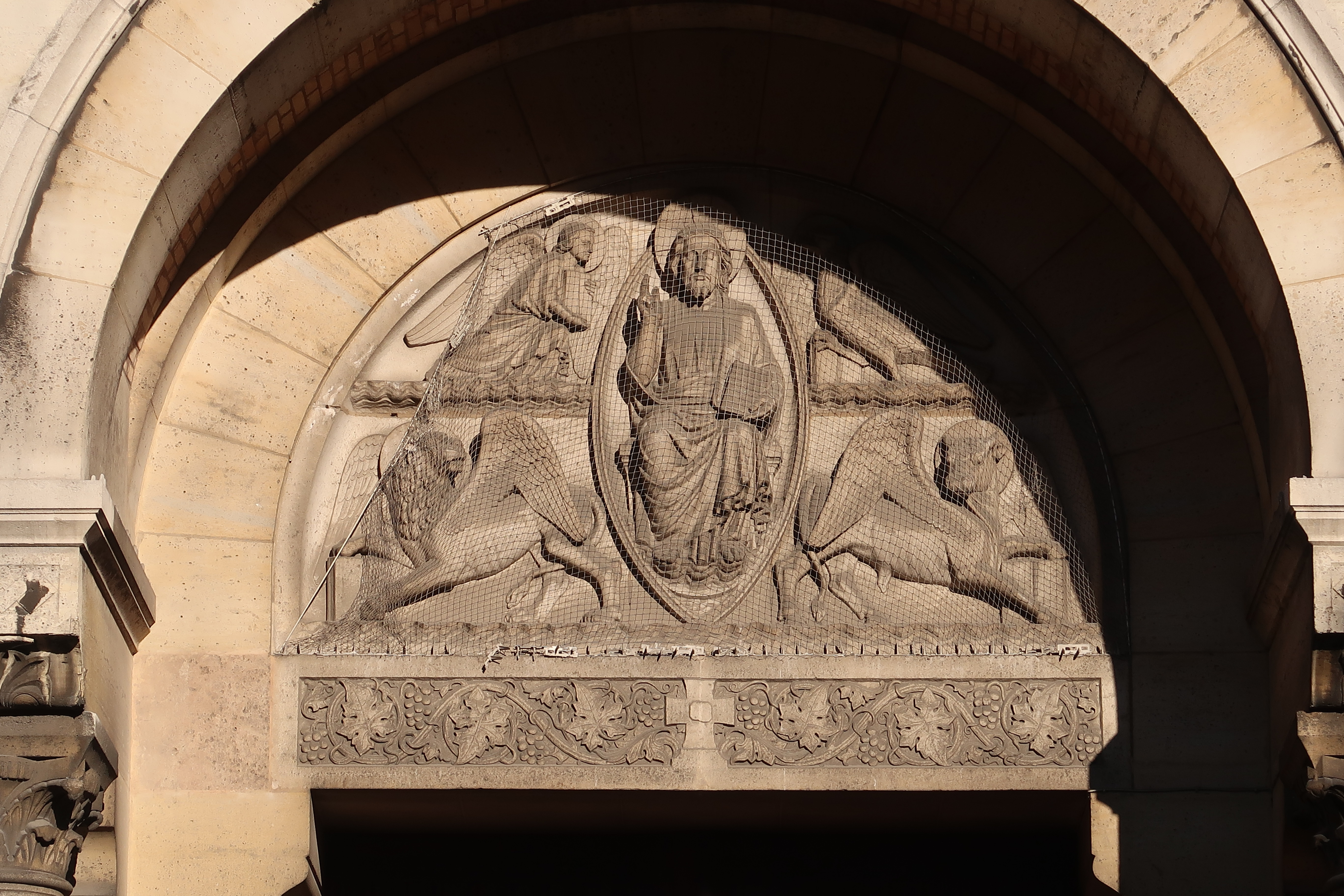
Tympanum over the portal- "Christ and the Apostles"

The church has a height of 63 meters, dominating the Place d'Auteuil. The cown0shated campanile or bell tower is fifty meters high. Its cone-shaped design was inspired by the traditional tiara of the Pope.

The tympanum of the archivolt displays a sculpture by Henri-Charles Maniglier made in 1880, depicting Christ in Glory surrounded by the symbolic animals of the four Evangelists.

== Interior ==
Some traces of the earlier church, destroyed in 1880, are found in the sacristy. The church is 63 meters long and rectangular in plan, and is topped a 50-meter-tall (160 ft) spire. The modern church is modestly decorated with bas-reliefs in bronze and retables. The stained glass windows have geometric designs. The windows are narrow, and as a result the interior light is dim. One unusual feature is the elevation of the choir slightly higher than the nave, since the crypt is placed beneath it. he Chapel of the Virgin in the apse is also placed higher than choir.

The art of the interior includes two notable statues of the Virgin Mary with child; one in the porch, and the other, of marble, on the altar in the Chapel of the Virgin.

Its organ has three manual and pedal keyboards (both electrically powered) and 53 jeux/71 rangs and is characterised by its high quality, best adapted for Romantic music such as that of Widor or Dupré. Its original organ, by Aristide Cavaillé-Coll, has been rebuilt in Trocadéro.

=== Stained Glass and Interior Light ===
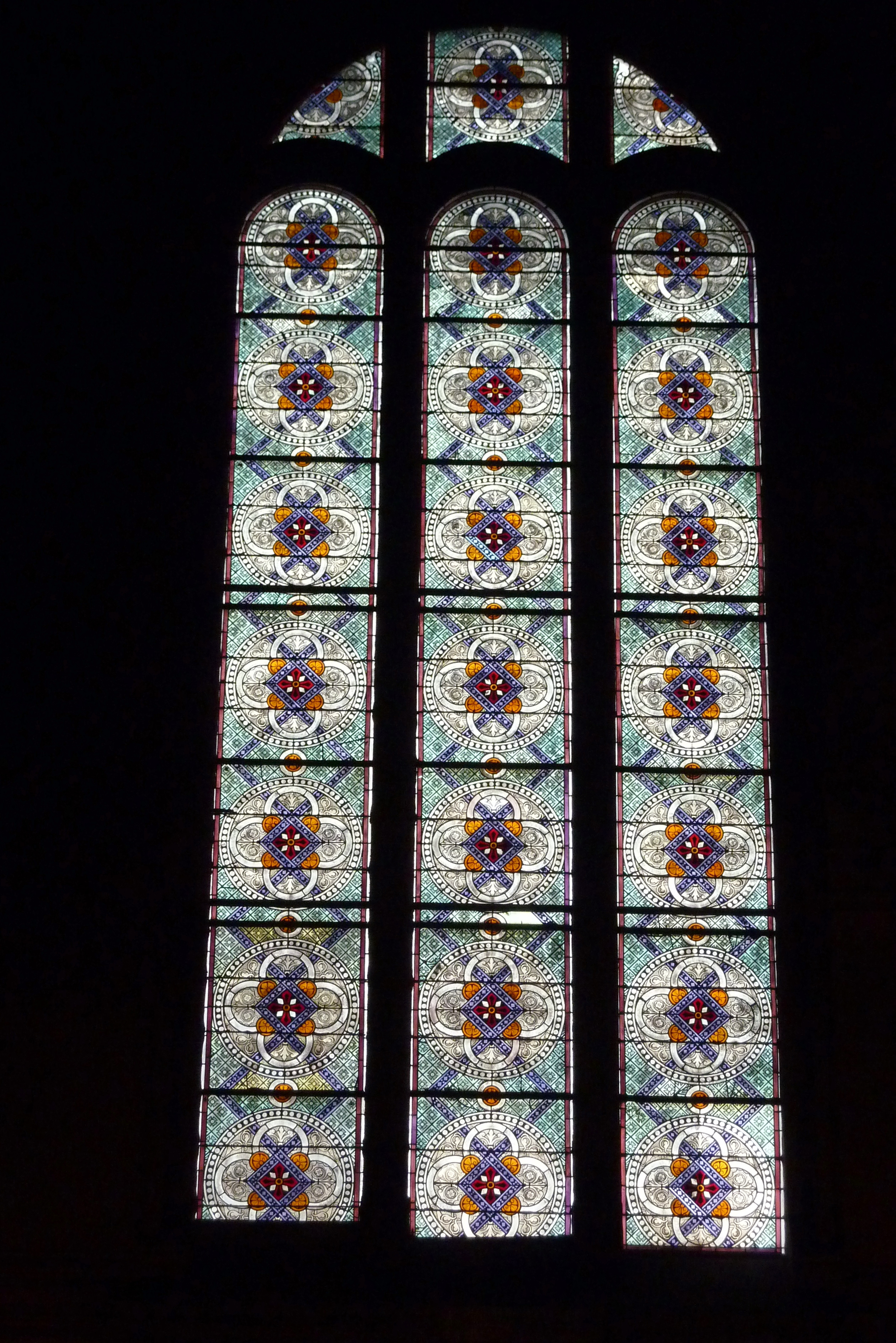
An ornamental window

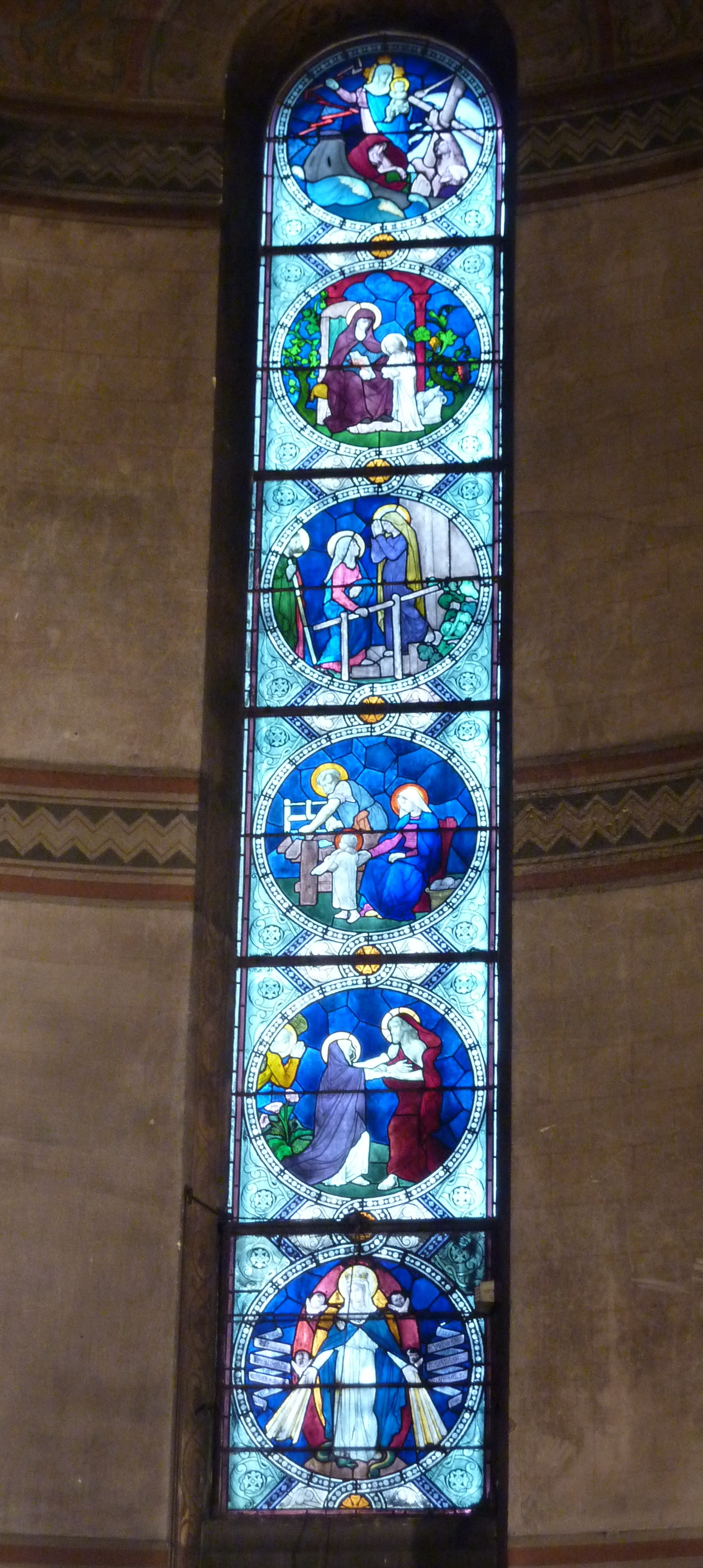
Scenes from the life of Saint Mary

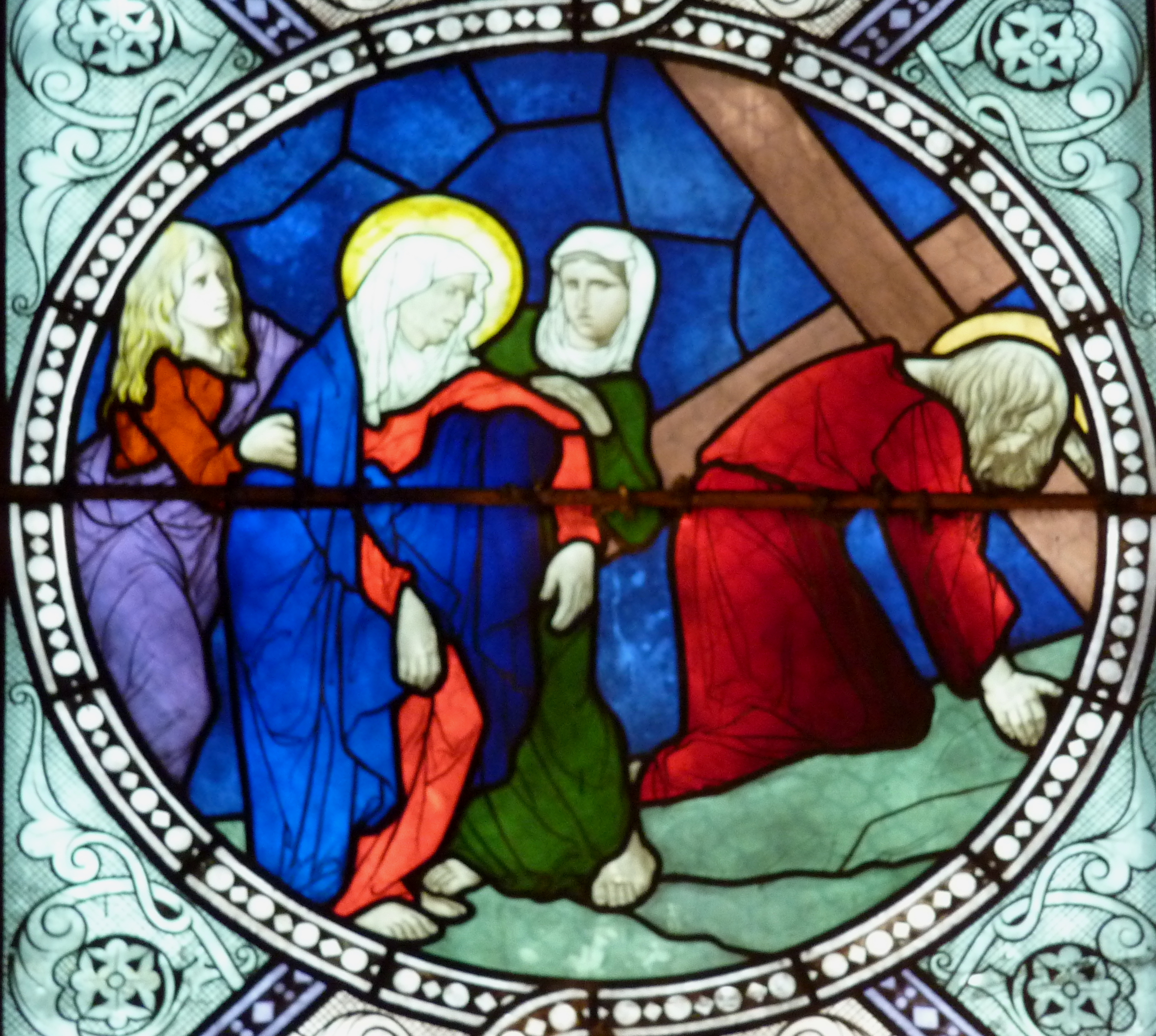
Christ and Saint Mary by G.E. Roussel

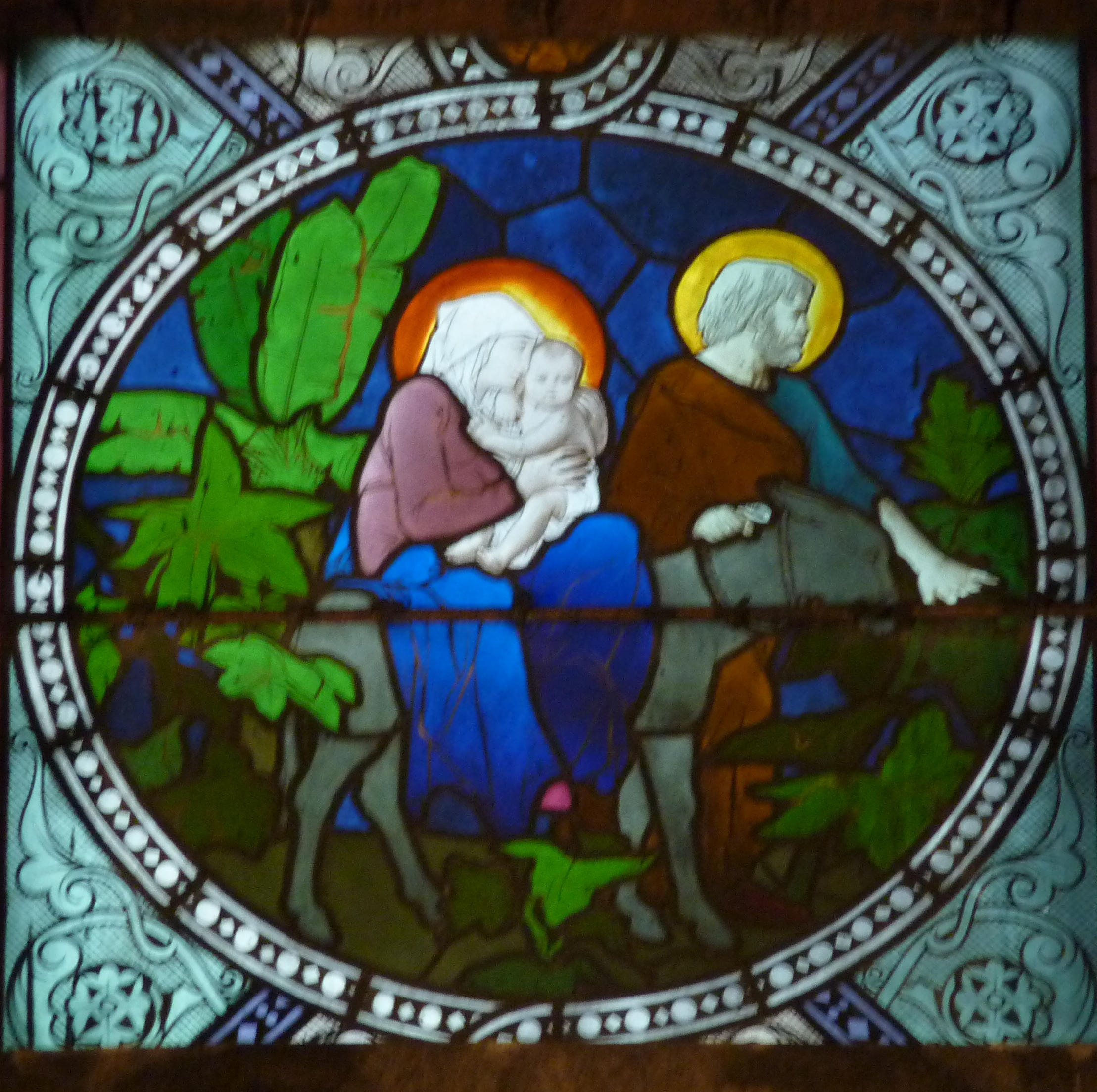
Flight to Egypt

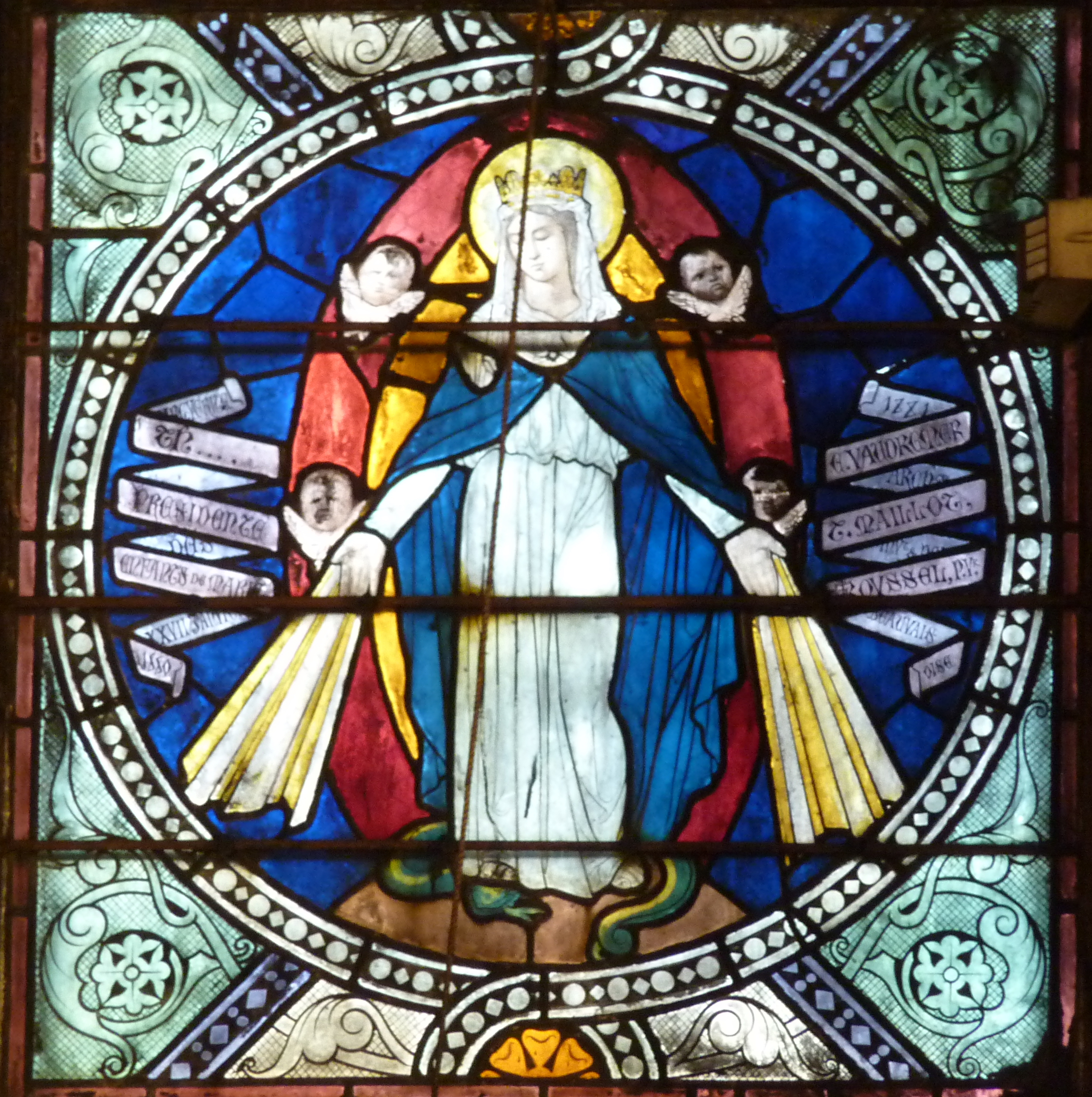
The Madonna

The stained glass windows are narrow and do not bring in much light, but they contain some very fine artistry, particularly the series of windows made to depict the life of the Virgin, made by the master glass craftsman G.E. Roussel. Major modifications were carried out on the windows and architecture from September 2021 through October 2023, to increase the light in the interior. The renovation cost three million Euros, of which one million was raised from private donors. The result was a much brighter church.

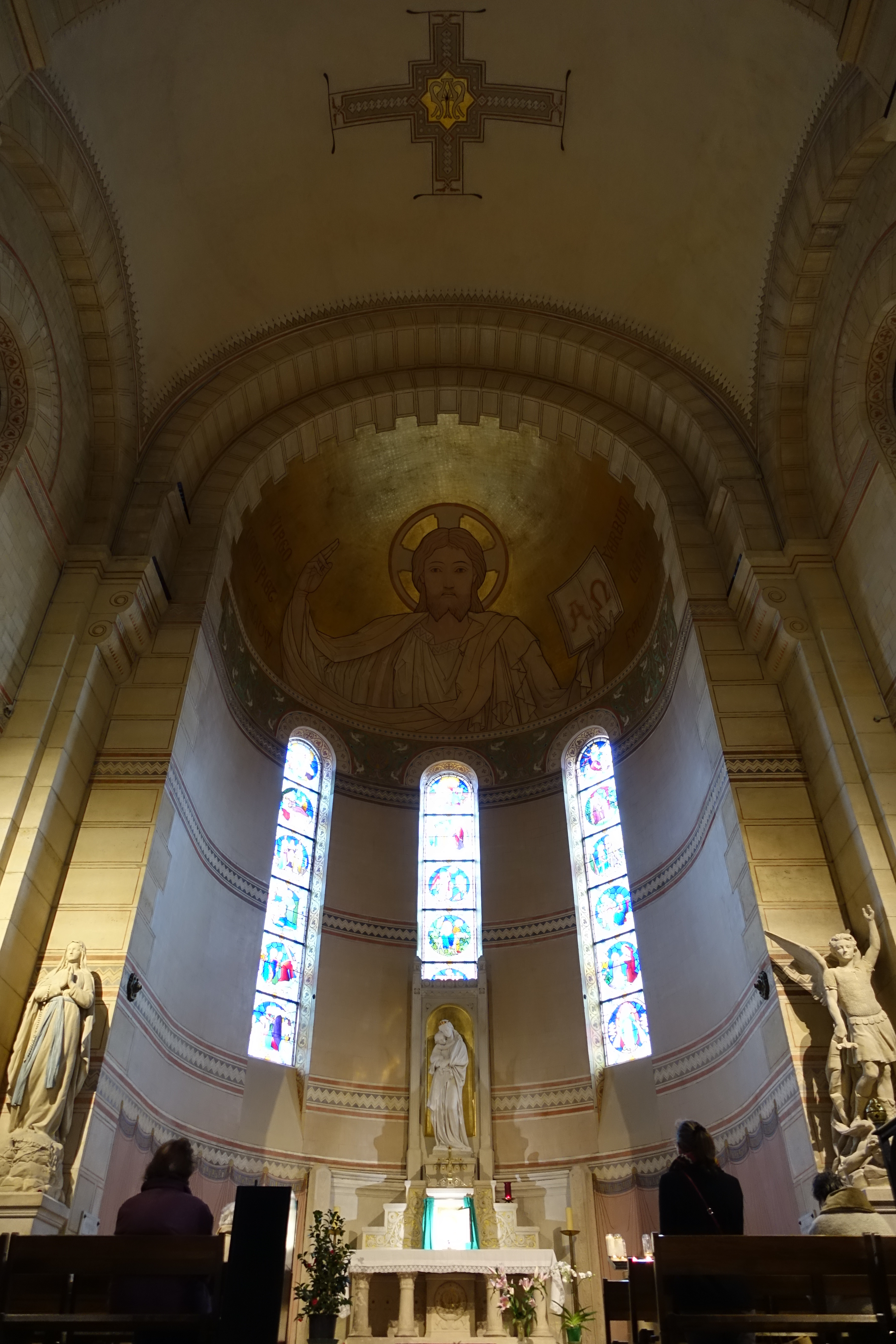
The Choir in 2017, before modification

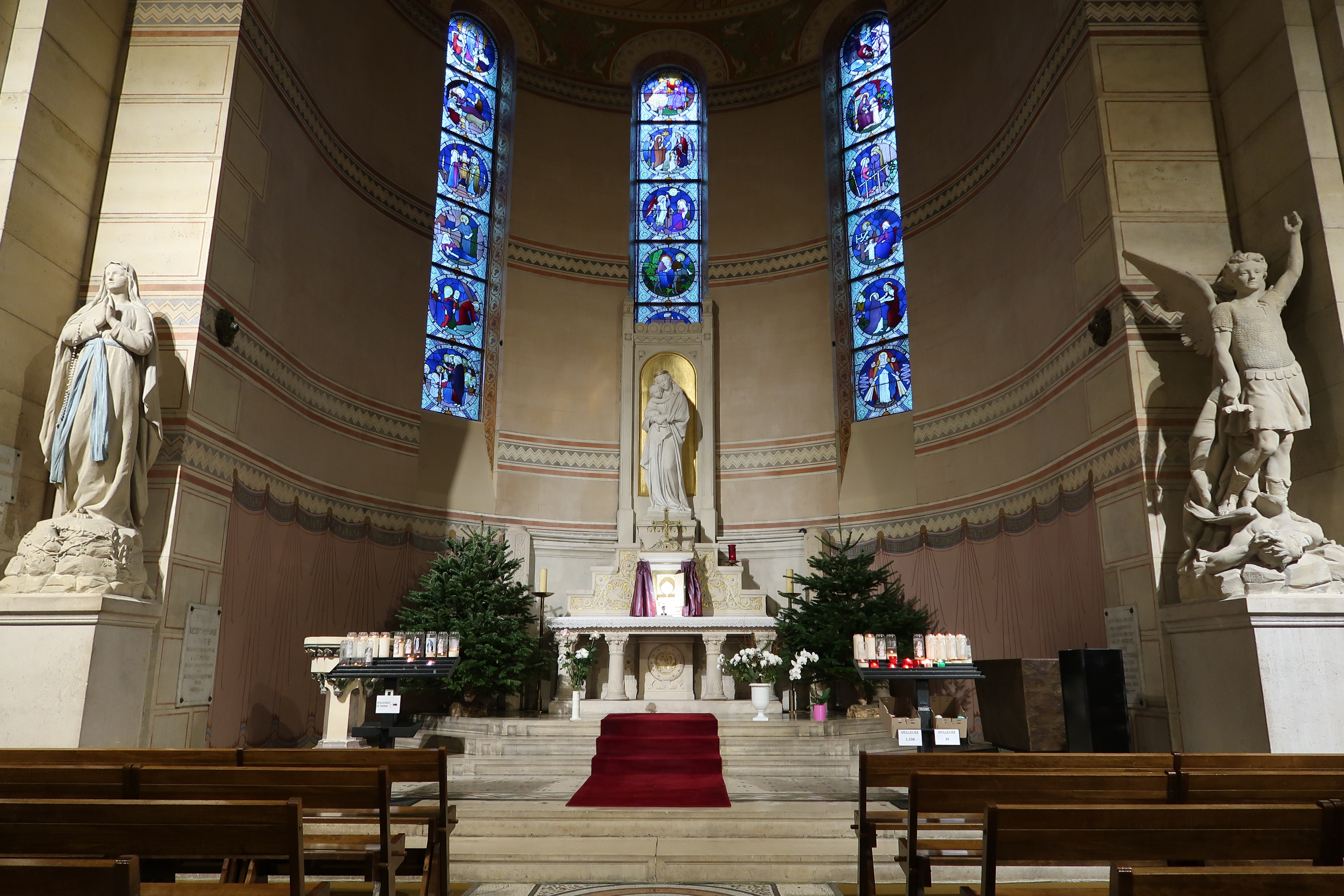
The choir

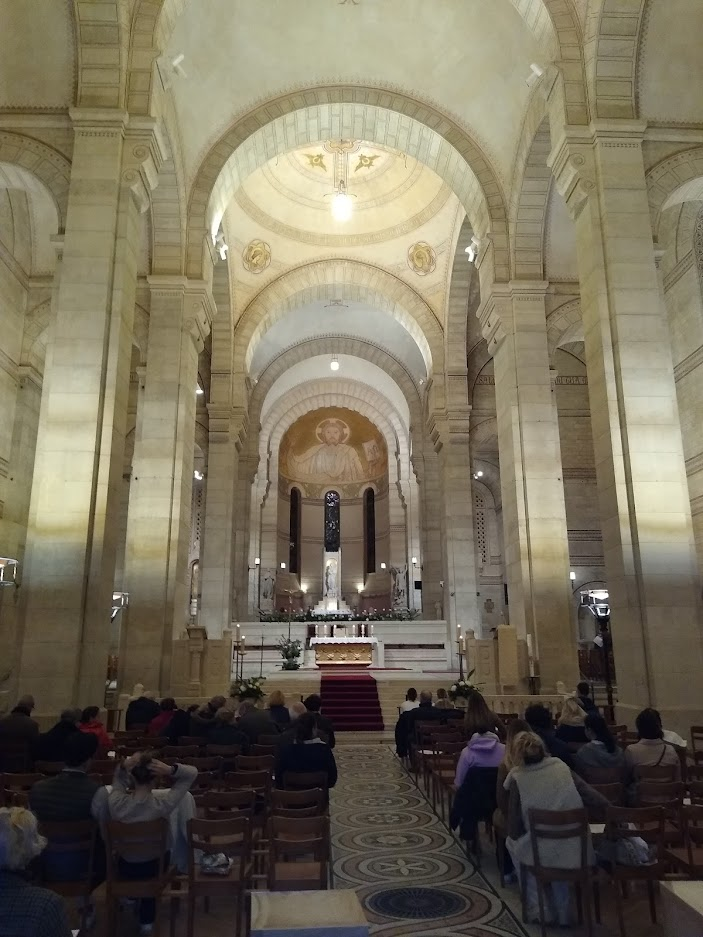
The nave and choir after (2024)

== The Organs ==
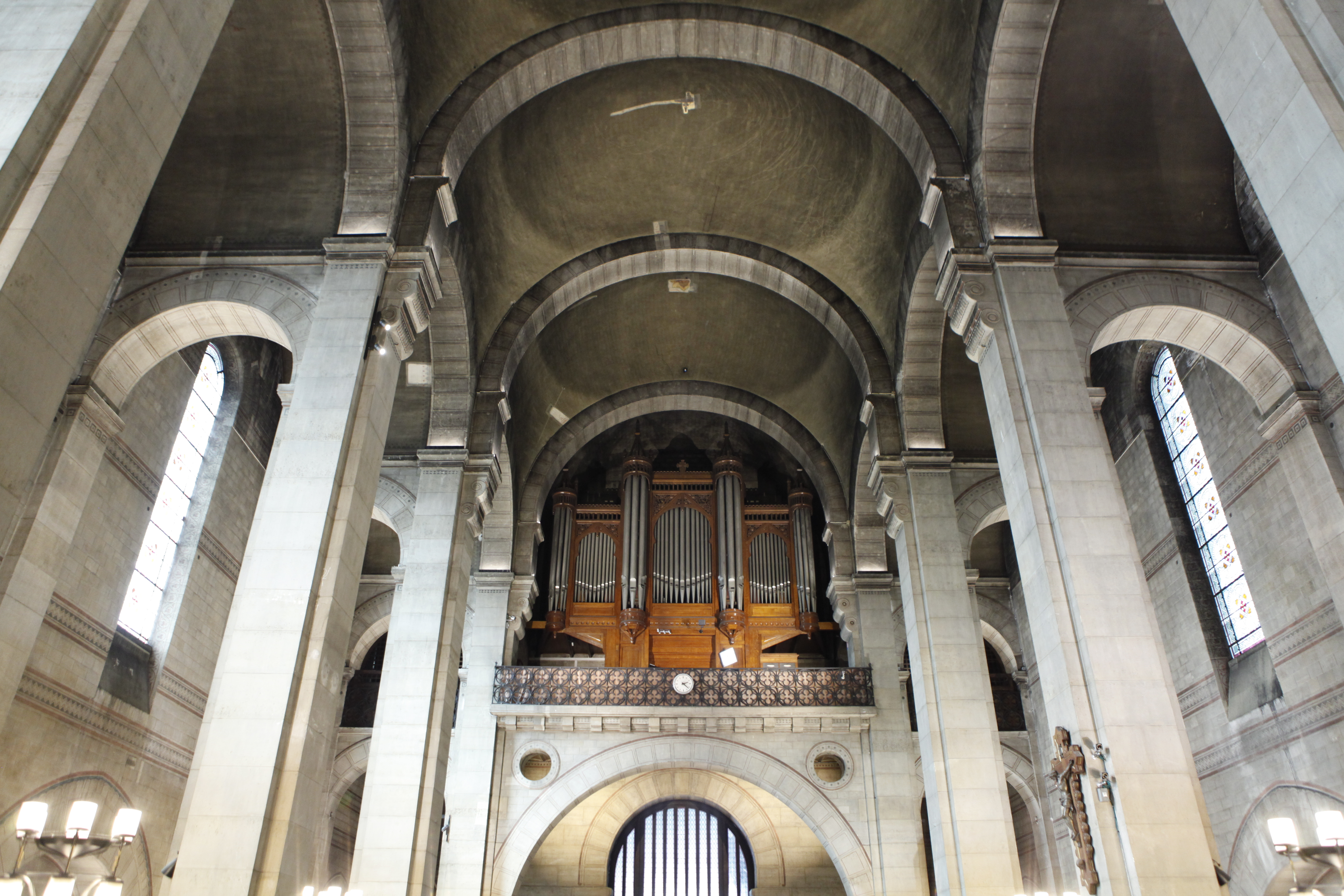
The organ of the tribune

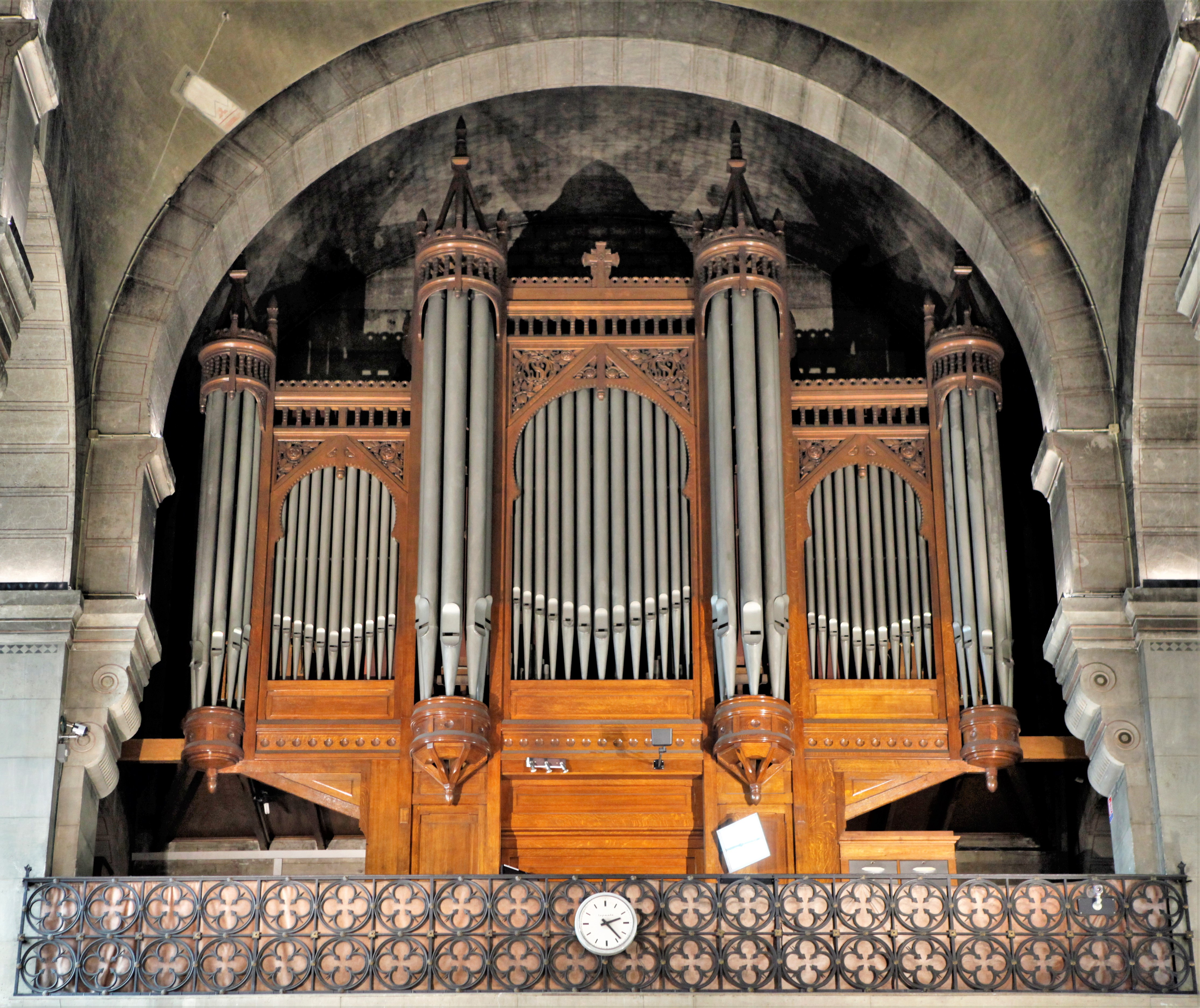
Closer view of the organ in the tribune

The organ on the tribune was built by the firm of Cavaillé-Coll in 1885 and has been restored several times. Its sound has a very high reputation among Paris church organs.

Since 1999, the church organist has been Frédéric Blanc.
