= Duruflé: Complete Choral Works =

Studio album by Houston Chamber Choir, Robert Simpson, Ken Cowan
- Released: April 5, 2019
- Recorded: June 2017
- Venue: Rice University in Houston, Texas
- Studio: Edythe Bates Old Organ Hall, Shepherd School of Music
- Genre: Classical music
- Length: 1:08:42
- Label: Signum Classics SIGCD571
- Producer: Blanton Alspaugh

Duruflé: Complete Choral Works is the seventh release by the choral group Houston Chamber Choir performing the unabridged choral works of composer Maurice Duruflé. Conducted by Artistic Director Robert Simpson and performed by organist Ken Cowan, the project is their first to be released under the Signum Classics label. The album won the 2020 Grammy Award for Best Choral Performance.

== Overview ==
Artistic Director Robert Simpson originally planned to perform the works of Duruflé for the choir's 2016–2017 season opening concert. But as the concert began to take shape, Simpson realized that the program was simply too special to perform for a singular concert, thereby driving the decision to launch a full recording project. He said the whole process was "a labor of love from the very start". The choir and organist Ken Cowan were joined by soloists Eduardo Tercero- Baritone, Cecilia Duarte- Mezzo Soprano and Norman Fischer- Cello for the recording.

== Reception ==
Mark Rochester of Gramophone writes of the 'highly polished, virtually flawless sound of the Houston Chamber Choir' on the project. James Manheim of AllMusic writes 'The album presents all of Duruflé's choral music, which fits conveniently on one CD, and it offers both distinctive performances and really superb recording of an impressive organ.'. In its 2019 Year in Review, AllMusic awarded the project as one of the Favorite Classical Vocal Albums of the year with a rating of 4.5 out of 5 stars.

== Track listing ==
All compositions by Maurice Duruflé

1. Messe "Cum Jubilo" pour choeur de barytons et orgue, Op. 11: I. Kyrie - 3:45
2. Messe "Cum Jubilo" pour choeur de barytons et orgue, Op. 11: II. Gloria - 6:13
3. Messe "Cum Jubilo" pour choeur de barytons et orgue, Op. 11: III. Sanctus - 3:53
4. Messe "Cum Jubilo" pour choeur de barytons et orgue, Op. 11: IV. Benedictus - 2:00
5. Messe "Cum Jubilo" pour choeur de barytons et orgue, Op. 11: V. Agnus Dei - 4:04
6. Quatre Motets sur des thèmes grégoriens pour choeur a cappella, Op. 10: I. Ubi caritas - 2:49
7. Quatre Motets sur des thèmes grégoriens pour choeur a cappella, Op. 10: II. Tota pulchra es - 2:06
8. Quatre Motets sur des thèmes grégoriens pour choeur a cappella, Op. 10: III. Tu es petrus - 1:02
9. Quatre Motets sur des thèmes grégoriens pour choeur a cappella, Op. 10: IV. Tantum ergo - 2:39
10. Notre Père pour choeur a cappella - 1:30
11. Requiem pour soli, choeurs et orgue, Op. 9: I. Introit - 3:32
12. Requiem pour soli, choeurs et orgue, Op. 9: II. Kyrie - 3:47
13. Requiem pour soli, choeurs et orgue, Op. 9: III. Domine Jesu Christe - 8:35
14. Requiem pour soli, choeurs et orgue, Op. 9: IV. Sanctus & Benedictus - 3:06
15. Requiem pour soli, choeurs et orgue, Op. 9: V. Pie Jesu - 3:15
16. Requiem pour soli, choeurs et orgue, Op. 9: VI: Agnus Dei - 3:48
17. Requiem pour soli, choeurs et orgue, Op. 9: VII: Lux aeterna - 4:14
18. Requiem pour soli, choeurs et orgue, Op. 9: VIII: Libera me - 5:34
19. Requiem pour soli, choeurs et orgue, Op. 9: IX: In Paradisum - 2:47

Total Run Time - 68:42

== Personnel ==
Adapted from Discogs.com

Musicians

- Maurice Duruflé - Composer
- Robert Simpson - Conductor
- Ken Cowan - Organist
- Eduardo Tercero - Baritone Soloist (Tracks 2 & 4)
- Cecilia Duarte - Mezzo Soprano Soloist (Track 15)
- Norman Fischer - Cellist (Track 15)

Production

- Blanton Alspaugh - Producer
- John Newton - Engineer
- Carl R. Cunningham - Liner Notes

Chorus Members

- Soprano - Briana Kerner, Daniela D'Ingiullo, Elizabeth Tait, Kammi Estelle, Kelli Lawless, Stacey Franklin, Stephanie Handal
- Alto - Clipper Hamrick, Jennifer Crippen, Lauren Pastorek, Marianna Parnas-Simpson, Monica Isomura, Ryan Stickney
- Tenor - Alphonso Seals, Jack Byrom, Jeffrey Ragsdale, L. Wayne Ashley
- Bass - Casey Carruth, Jeffrey Van Hal, Joshua Wilson, Patrick Schneider, Rameen Chaharbaghi, Randolph Wagner
