= Ken Cowan =

Canadian musician

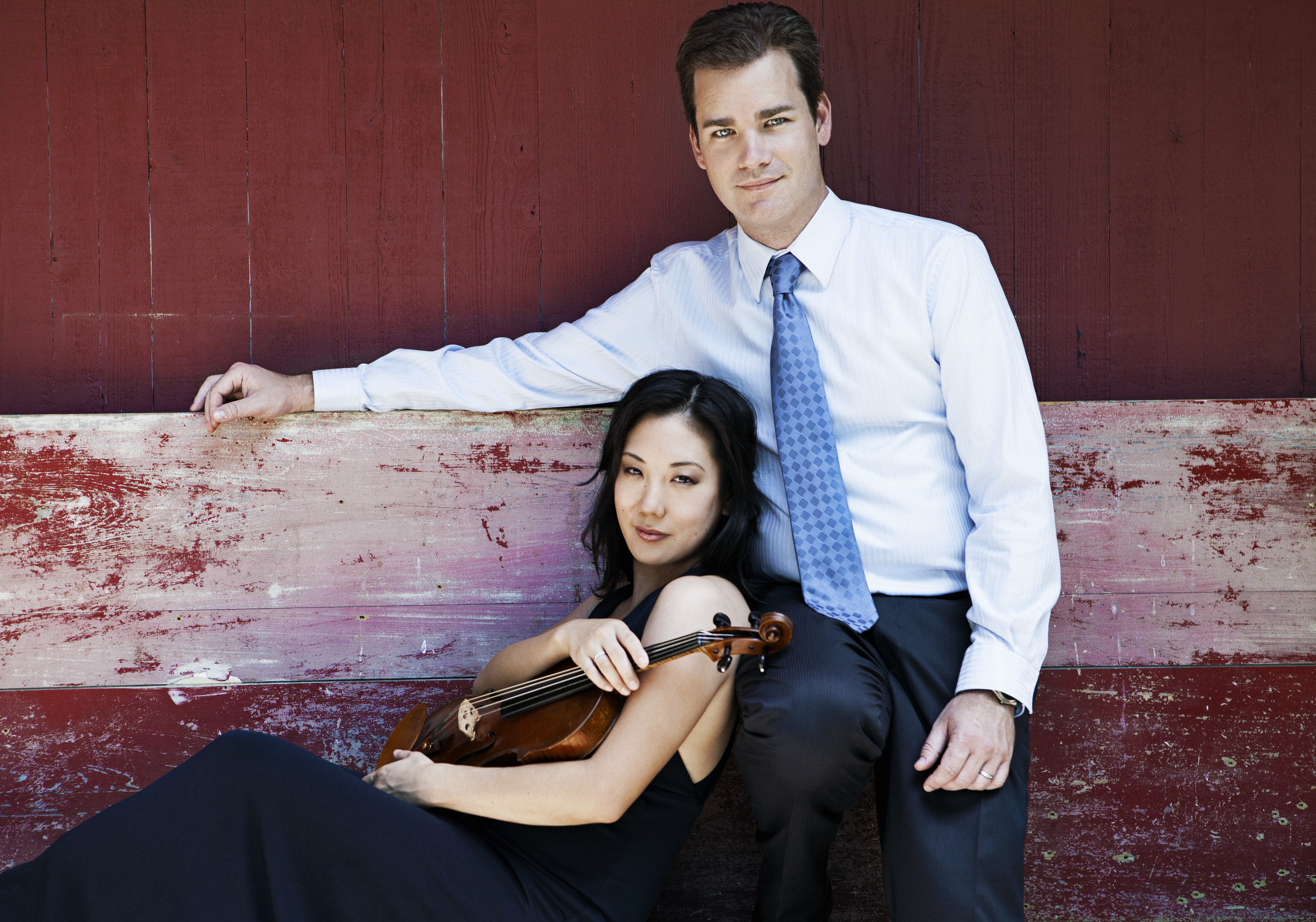
Cowan and his wife Lisa Shihoten (July 12, 2012)

Kenneth Andrew Cowan (born December 19, 1974) is a Canadian church and concert organist who currently serves as professor of organ at the Shepherd School of Music of Rice University in Houston, Texas.

== Biography ==
A native of Thorold, Ontario, he has toured extensively in the United States, Canada, Europe, and Asia, and has made numerous recordings, most on the JAV label. Cowan is a graduate of both the Curtis Institute of Music (Bachelor of Music) and the Yale Institute of Sacred Music (Master of Music and Artist Diploma). He has held positions at Saint Bartholomew's Church, Saint James Episcopal Church, the Church of Saint Mary the Virgin in New York City, Saint Clement's Church, Philadelphia, and Westminster Choir College in Princeton, New Jersey, where he served as Assistant Professor of Organ and Coordinator of Organ and Sacred Music, where he was awarded the 2008 Rider University Distinguished Teaching Award.

He has also been on the roster of Associate Organists for the famous Wanamaker Grand Court Organ in Philadelphia.

Cowan, an acclaimed organist with numerous reviews, has been a featured recitalist at three national conventions of the American Guild of Organists. He lives in Houston, Texas with his wife Lisa Shihoten, where he serves as a faculty member at the Shepherd School of Music at Rice University.

== Awards ==
- 2008 Rider University Distinguished Teaching Award.
- 2020 GRAMMY Award for Best Choral Performance - Duruflé complete Choral works - Houston Chamber Choir, Robert Simpson artist director, and Ken Cowan organ.
