= Marie-Madeleine Duruflé =

French organist (1921–1999)

- Born: Jeanne Marie-Madeleine Chevalier; 8 May 1921; Marseille, France
- Died: 5 October 1999 (aged 78); Paris, France
- Education: Conservatoire d'Avignon; Conservatoire de Paris
- Occupations: Organist; Composer; Music pedagogue
- Organizations: Saint-Étienne-du-Mont
- Spouse: Maurice Duruflé
- Awards: Grand Prix International Charles-Marie Widor; Ordre des Arts et des Lettres

Jeanne Marie-Madeleine Duruflé (née Chevalier; 8 May 1921 – 5 October 1999) was a French organist. Regarded as the last of the French school of organists, she played works by Widor, Vierne, Langlais, Dupré and her husband, Maurice Duruflé. She and her husband were both organists at Saint-Étienne-du-Mont in Paris, and toured internationally, especially in the U.S..

== Life and career ==
Jeanne Marie-Madeleine Chevalier was born in Marseille on 8 May 1921, the daughter of Auguste-Marie Chevalier and Suzanne Chevalier-Rigoir. When she was age six, the family moved to Cavaillon. She grew up with a sister, Elaine, who would become a solfege teacher and a choral conductor in Paris. Marie-Madeleine was soon recognized as very talented. She began piano lessons with her grandmother, and began to compose piano pieces. When she was 11, she was appointed organist of the Cathédrale Saint-Véran. At the age of 12, she began to study at the Conservatoire d'Avignon. She planned to study further in Paris at age 18, but remained in the South due to the outbreak of the Second World War.

In 1946, at the age of 25, she began to study under Marcel Dupré at the Conservatoire de Paris, where she won first prize in organ. She met Maurice Duruflé, her future husband, at the Conservatoire where he was a substitute for Dupré during tours. In 1947, she became assistant-organist at the church of Saint-Étienne-du-Mont in Paris, where her future husband had been organist since 1930. In 1953, she received the Grand Prix International Charles-Marie Widor for organ and improvisation in Lyon.

The couple married in 1953. She composed Six Fables de La Fontaine for unaccompanied choir in 1959 for the children's choir that her sister directed. She and husband toured and gave concerts together, appearing in the U.S. for the first time in 1964. They also toured in Europe and the USSR. During her tours with her husband, she used to play the most impressive works. In an interview for The New York Times in 1989, she admitted it was on purpose: "My husband was a very great virtuose at the organ, but once he became my husband, I worked harder than him. He used to tell me often: 'you will play the most difficult pieces, and I will play the ones of interpretation'".

In 1975 the couple were involved in a car accident in the south of France. She injured her ribs and pelvis; her husband Maurice was more seriously wounded, having broken both legs. He gave up performing, while she continued to play as the organist at Saint-Étienne-du-Mont until 1996.

In 1989, three years after her husband's death, Duruflé took part in a festival "Duruflé" in New York, her first international recital in 15 years. Her last public concert took place at the Ascension Church in New York City in 1993.

Duruflé died at age 78. Anthony Tommasini's obituary in The New York Times summarised:

Mrs. Durufle, a technically formidable organist, was generally considered the last great exponent of the French Romantic school of organ playing, which valued elegant grandeur, textural clarity and rhythmic freedom. She gave incomparable performances of works by the French organ masters, including Charles-Marie Widor, Louis Vierne, Jean Langlais, Marcel Dupre and her husband, who died 13 years ago. She was a tireless champion of his organ works, which were harmonically conservative yet mystical, finely crafted and often brilliant.

== Awards ==
- 1949: First Prize for interpretation and improvisation at the Conservatoire de Paris
- 1953: Grand Prix International Charles-Marie Widor for organ and improvisation
- 5 June 1987: Officier des Arts et Lettres
