= Houston Chamber Choir =

- Choir
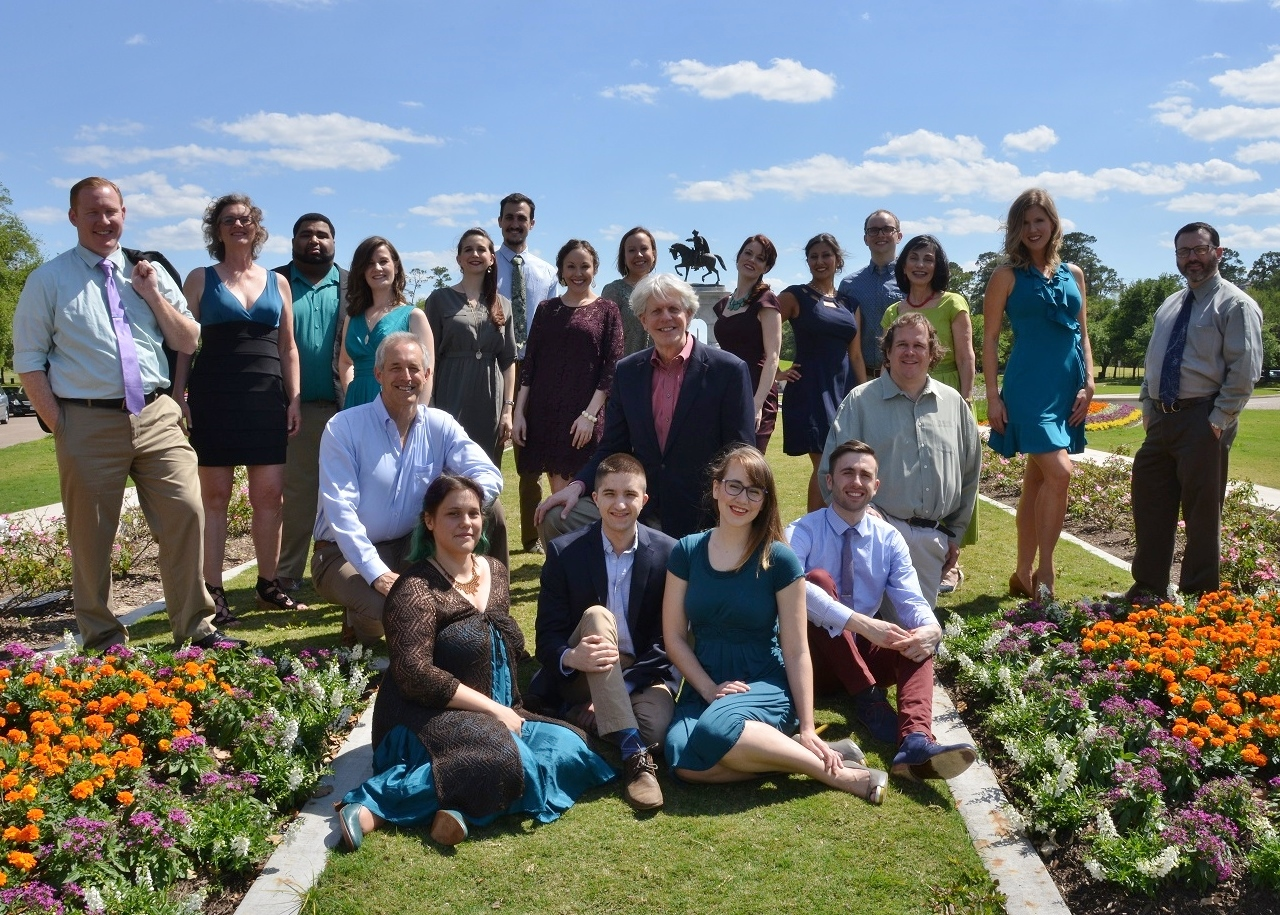
- Houston Chamber Choir, April 2017
- Origin: Houston, Texas, United States
- Founded: 1995 (31 years ago)
- Founder: Robert Simpson
- Genre: Renaissance; Baroque; Classical; Romantic; Modern
- Artistic Director: Betsy Cook Weber
- Awards: List of awards and accolades
- Website: houstonchamberchoir.org

The Houston Chamber Choir is a professional chamber choir based in Houston, Texas. It was founded in 1995 by Artistic Director Robert Simpson. The ensemble annually presents an eight-concert series of diverse, innovative choral programming throughout the Houston region. In 2024, internationally acclaimed conductor Dr. Betsy Cook Weber was appointed Artistic Director Designate, and joined forces with Artistic Director Robert Simpson to lead the choir's landmark 30th season. Weber began her tenure as Artistic Director in 2025.

They have appeared nationally at the American Choral Directors Association convention, the Chorus America convention, Spoleto Festival USA, Trinity Church in Manhattan, and Yale University. The choir also has toured internationally in Mexico and Wales.

== Recordings ==
- The Blue Estuaries: American Choral Music (Zephyr, 2001)
- Ravishingly Russian (MSR Classics, 2009)
- Psalmi ad Vesperas (MSR Classics, 2012)
- Soft Blink of Amber Light (MSR Classics, 2015)
- Rothko Chapel: Morton Feldman, Erik Satie, John Cage (ECM, 2015)
- Behold the Star! Christmas at the Villa (2018)
- Duruflé: Complete Choral Works (Signum Classics, 2019) - Grammy Winner
- Bob Chilcott: Circlesong (Signum Classics, 2022)
- Daniel Knaggs: Two Streams (Capella Romana, 2023)
- The Joyful Mysteries: Choral Symphony and Other Works by Daniel Knaggs (Acis, 2024)

== Collaborations ==
The Houston Chamber Choir has performed and collaborated with some of the world's leading artists, including:

- Anton Armstrong
- Sam Beam (Iron & Wine)
- Jamie Bernstein
- Alex Blachly
- Marguerite Brooks
- Dave Brubeck
- Simon Carrington
- Bob Chilcott
- Cynthia Clawson
- Manfred Cordes
- Ken Cowan
- Joseph Flummerfelt
- María Guinand
- Paul Hillier
- Kim Kashkashian
- Christian McBride
- Bill McGlaughlin
- Kim Nazarian
- Peter Phillips
- Peter Schickele (P.D.Q. Bach)
- Elena Sharkova
- Steven Schick
- Barnaby Smith
- Anthony Trecek-King

== Commissions ==
Beyond the known and celebrated choral works, the Houston Chamber Choir is also a champion of contemporary choral music, having expanded the repertoire with nearly a dozen commissions of new works. All but one of the compositions from Soft Blink of Amber Light are works commissioned and premiered by the ensemble. Composers commissioned by the choir include:

- Mark Buller
- Dominick DiOrio
- Jocelyn Hagen
- Daniel J. Knaggs
- Christian McBride
- Christopher Theofanidis
- David Ashley White

== Awards and accolades ==
In 2015, the choir was the winner of The American Prize for Choral Performance.

Its two 2015 albums, Soft Blink of Amber Light and Rothko Chapel: Morton Feldman, Erik Satie, John Cage have been met with international acclaim. The Rothko Chapel project, recorded in partnership with Da Camera of Houston Artistic Director Sarah Rothenberg, was a US Billboard Top 10 and UK Top 20 Classical Album and was named one of the Best Classical Recordings of 2015 by the Chicago Tribune.

The choir is the recipient of the 2018 Margaret Hillis Award for Choral Excellence given by Chorus America.

The 2019 recording Duruflé: Complete Choral Works was the choir's first Grammy Award Nomination and it won the Grammy for Best Choral Performance.

The Houston Chamber Choir was selected to perform as one of the twenty-four choirs at the World Symposium on Choral Music sponsored by the International Federation for Choral Music in Auckland, New Zealand, in July 2020.
