= Gregorian Institute of Paris =

- Established: 1923
- Focus: Gregorian chant
- Formerly called: Institut de musique liturgique
- Location: Paris, France

The Gregorian Institute of Paris was a pedagogical and religious establishment founded in Paris in 1923 having in view the musicianship of Gregorian chant. (Note: (p. 193)) This institute was created following a Parisian congress devoted to Gregorian chant and sacred music, held in December 1922.

During the Second Vatican Council, this establishment became the Institut de musique liturgique in 1964, and finally was integrated with the Institut catholique de Paris in 1968, after their long collaboration.

== History ==
=== Creation ===
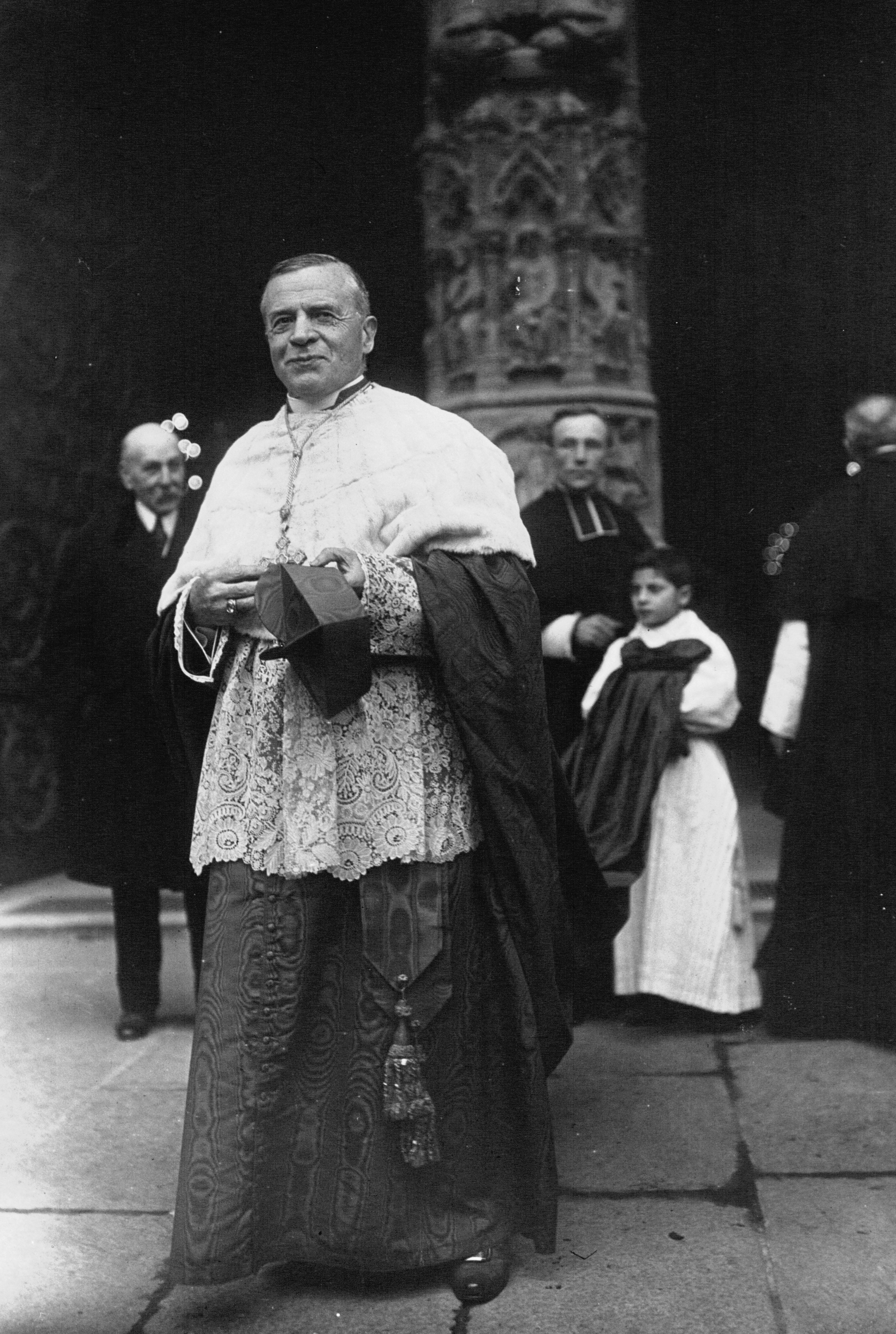
Cardinal Archbishop of Paris Louis-Ernest Dubois, father of the Institut.

In December 1922, a congress of Gregorian chant and sacred music was organized by l'Art Catholique. This conference was a huge success, thanks to the support of the new Archbishop of Paris since 1920, Louis-Ernest Dubois, and above all to the support of the monks of the Solesmes Abbey, who returned to France after their long exile to Quarr Abbey in England.

That is why, taking advantage of this success, the Gregorian Institute in Paris was founded under the protection of the Cardinal. Dom Joseph Gajard of Solesmes was in charge of teaching Gregorian chant there for two years, between Wednesday and Friday. Two years later, a former student of the Schola Cantorum de Paris, Auguste Le Guennant, succeeded him, not only as professor but also as director of the school. Following this creation, Pope Pius XI, a true successor of the liturgical reform of Saint Pope Pius X, expressed his "lively satisfaction" to Cardinal Dubois, sending him a brief message.

=== Conference ===
Just after the Institute was founded, the next congress was held. The Institute's first conference was held on 24 January 1924.

=== Collaborations ===
An independent establishment from 1934 onwards, the Institute maintained its collaboration with the Institut Catholique de Paris with its support. (Note: (p. 301))

Moreover, the Revue grégorienne, founded in 1911, had suspended publication since 1940. In 1946, the Institute supported its recovery by taking advantage of its newsletter, from which some of the elements were taken up by the journal. The director of the magazine was the first teacher of Gregorian chant, Dom Gajard. It was thanks in particular to the dynamism of his teacher Auguste Le Guennant, who helped restore several journals, despite a difficult period after the war. By promoting many Gregorian teachings such as Gregorian sessions, he turned his institute into a true Gregorian pedagogical centre. (Note: (pp. 302))

=== End of the institute and transformation ===
When they arrived in Rome in April 1964, the delegates of the Institute and its schola were congratulated by Pope Pius VI for their contribution to Gregorian chant. .

Presumably because of the Second Vatican Council, this institute became that same year Institut de musique liturgique, which in 1968 was finally attached to the Institut catholique de Paris, like other catholic institutes.

== Publications ==
The Institute also published its newsletter, which distinguished itself by its collaboration in support of the Revue grégorienne.

- Bulletin mensuel de l'Institut grégorien et de l'Association des amis de l'Institut grégorien, ISSN 1760-9437: (1923 - 1940, 1946 - 1951, see also Revue grégorienne)
- Institut grégorien de Paris, Association des amis de l'Institut grégorien : bulletin bimestriel (1951–1952), ISSN 1760-9445

== Alumni ==
- Léon Destroismaisons

== See also ==
- Gregorian Chant
- Institut catholique de Paris

== Bibliography ==
- Institut Catholique de Paris, Le Livre du Centenaire, 1875 - 1975, Beauchesne, Paris 1975 ISBN 978-2-7010-0377-1 412 p. on line (excerpt)
