= Maurice Duruflé =

French classical composer and organist (1902–1986)

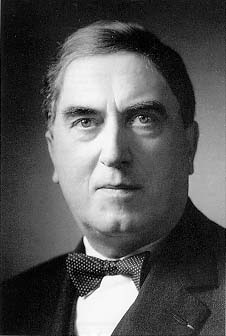
- Duruflé c. 1962
- Born: 11 January 1902; Louviers, Eure, France
- Died: 16 June 1986 (aged 84); Louveciennes, Yvelines, France
- Occupations: Composer; Organist; Academic teacher

Maurice Gustave Duruflé (French: [dyʁyfle]; 11 January 1902 – 16 June 1986) was a French composer, organist, musicologist, and teacher. He is particularly well known for his Requiem (1947).

== Life and career ==
Duruflé was born in Louviers, Eure in 1902. He attended Rouen Cathedral Choir School from 1912 to 1918, where he studied piano and organ with Jules Haelling, a pupil of Alexandre Guilmant. The choral plainsong tradition at Rouen became a strong and lasting influence. At age 17, upon moving to Paris, he took private organ lessons with Charles Tournemire, whom he assisted at Basilique Ste-Clotilde, Paris until 1927. In 1920 Duruflé entered the Conservatoire de Paris, graduating with first prizes in organ with Eugène Gigout (1922), harmony with Jean Gallon (1924), fugue with Georges Caussade (1924), piano accompaniment with César Abel Estyle (1926) and composition with Paul Dukas (1928).

In 1927, Louis Vierne nominated him as his assistant at Notre-Dame. Duruflé and Vierne remained lifelong friends, and Duruflé was at Vierne's side acting as assistant when Vierne died at the console of the Notre-Dame organ on 2 June 1937, even though Duruflé had become titular organist of St-Étienne-du-Mont in Paris in 1929, a position he held for the rest of his life. In 1930 he won a prize for his Prélude, adagio et choral varié sur le "Veni Creator", and in 1936 he won the Prix Blumenthal. In 1939, he premiered Francis Poulenc's Organ Concerto (the Concerto for Organ, Strings and Timpani in G minor); he had advised Poulenc on the registrations of the organ part. In 1943 he became Professor of Harmony at the Conservatoire de Paris, where he worked until 1970; among his pupils were the revered organists Pierre Cochereau, Jean Guillou and Marie-Claire Alain.

In 1947 he completed probably the most famous of his few pieces: the Requiem op. 9, for soloists, choir, organ, and orchestra. He had begun composing the work in 1941, following a commission from the Vichy regime. Also in 1947, Marie-Madeleine Chevalier became his assistant at St-Étienne-du-Mont. They married on 15 September 1953. (Duruflé's first marriage to Lucette Bousquet, in 1932, ended in civil divorce in 1947 and was declared null by the Vatican on 23 June 1953.) The couple became a famous and popular organ duo, going on tour together several times throughout the sixties and early seventies.

He was made Chevalier de la Legion d'honneur in 1954 and was promoted to Officier de la Legion d'honneur in 1966.

== Perfectionism ==
Duruflé was highly critical of his own compositions. He particularly disparaged the third and final movement 'Toccata' from his Suite, op. 5, and never recorded it. He never programmed the Toccata, his Sicilienne or the Prelude or Adagio from Veni Creator.

He published only a handful of works and often continued to edit and change pieces after publication. For instance, the Toccata from Suite has a completely different ending in the first edition than in the more recent version, and the score to the Fugue sur le nom d'Alain originally indicated accelerando throughout. The result of this perfectionism is that his music, especially his organ music, tends to be well polished, and is still frequently performed in concerts by organists around the world.

Duruflé and his wife were musically conservative. In 1969 they attended a "jazz mass" at St-Étienne-du-Mont. Marie-Madeleine was visibly upset by the experience, and Duruflé called it a scandalous travesty.

== Later life and death ==
Duruflé suffered severe injuries in a car crash on 29 May 1975, and as a result he gave up performing; indeed he was largely confined to his apartment, leaving the service at St-Étienne-du-Mont to his wife Marie-Madeleine (who was also injured in the crash). He died in a clinic at Louveciennes (near Paris) on 16 June 1986, aged 84, having never fully recovered from the crash.

== Compositions ==
=== Organ solo ===
- Pastorale (1926, unpublished)
- Pièce sur le thème du Credo (1926, unpublished)
- Méditation (1927, unpublished)
- Pièce (on a theme by Raoul Laparra, 1927, unpublished)
- Scherzo op. 2 (1926)
- Prélude, adagio et choral varié sur le theme du 'Veni Creator' op. 4 (1926/1930)
- Suite op. 5 (1932):
  - Prélude
  - Sicilienne
  - Toccata
- Prélude et fugue sur le nom d'Alain op. 7 (1942)
- Prélude sur l'introït de l'Épiphanie op. 13 (1961)
- Fugue sur le thème du Carillon des Heures de la Cathédrale de Soissons op. 12 (1962)
- Méditation op. posth. (1964, published 2001)
- Lecture à vue (sightreading piece for the organ class at the Conservatoire de Paris, unpublished)
- Lux æterna (unpublished)

=== Chamber music ===
- Prélude, récitatif et variations op. 3 for flute, viola, and piano (1928)

=== Piano solo ===
- Triptyque op. 1: Fantaisie sur des thèmes grégoriens (1927/1943, unpublished)
- Trois danses op. 6 (1932, piano version by the composer):
  - Divertissement
  - Danse lente
  - Tambourin

=== Piano for 4 hands ===
- Trois danses op. 6 (1932, transcribed by the composer):
  - Divertissement
  - Danse lente
  - Tambourin

=== Two pianos ===
- Trois danses op. 6 (1932, transcribed by the composer):
  - Divertissement
  - Danse lente
  - Tambourin

=== Orchestral works ===
- Trois danses op. 6 (1932):
  - Divertissement
  - Danse lente
  - Tambourin
- Andante et scherzo op. 8 (1940)
- Adagio as a central movement for George Frideric Handel's Organ Concerto, Op. 7, No. 2 (ca. 1967, unpublished)

=== Choral works ===
- Requiem Op. 9:
  - For vocal soloists, choir and (large) orchestra (normally including organ, but can be performed without one): commissioned as a symphonic poem in 1941; completed in September 1947; first performed on 2 November 1947; published in 1950
  - For the same vocal forces and organ ("organ reduction" version; cello ad libitum in one movement): published in 1948
  - For the same vocal forces, organ and (reduced) orchestra (several instruments ad libitum, but one or more string instruments in every movement): published in 1961
  - For the same vocal forces and piano (unpublished)
- Quatre Motets sur des thèmes grégoriens op. 10 for choir a cappella (1960):
  - Ubi caritas et amor
  - Tota pulchra es
  - Tu es Petrus
  - Tantum ergo
- Messe "Cum jubilo" op. 11 for baritone solo, male choir, and orchestra (1966):
  - Version with organ (1967)
  - Version with orchestra (1970)
  - Version with small orchestra (1972)
- Notre Père op. 14 for unison male choir and organ (1977)
  - Version for 4-part mixed choir a cappella (1978)

=== Miscellaneous works ===
- Basse donnée on a subject by Joseph Morpain (1924)
- Fugue (1928)
- Chant donné : Hommage à Jean Gallon (1953)
- Sicilienne from Suite op. 5 for small orchestra (flute, oboe, clarinet, bassoon, horn, and string quintet, unpublished)

=== Transcriptions ===
- Johann Sebastian Bach
  - Two chorales from cantatas BWV 22 and 147, arranged for organ solo, 1952
  - 4 chorales preludes for organ, orchestrated 1942-45:
    - Nun komm' der Heiden Heiland (Great Eighteen Chorale Preludes)
    - Nun freut euch, lieben Christen gmein, BWV 734
    - O Lamm Gottes unschuldig, BWV 656 (Great Eighteen Chorale Preludes)
    - In dir ist Freude, BWV 615 (Orgelbüchlein)
- Louis Vierne
  - Soirs étrangers, op. 56, for violoncello and piano, orchestrated 1943:
    - Grenade
    - Sur le Léman
    - Venise
    - Steppe Canadien
    - Poisson chinois
  - Ballade du désespéré, op. 61, lyrical poem for tenor solo and piano, orchestrated 1943
  - Three improvisations for organ (Notre-Dame-de-Paris, November 1928), transcribed 1954:
    - Marche épiscopale
    - Méditation
    - Cortège
- Maurice Duruflé: Requiem, op. 9, for voices and piano (1947)
- Charles Tournemire
  - Five improvisations for organ (Ste Clotilde, Paris, 1930/1931), transcribed 1956–58:
    - Petite rapsodie improvisée
    - Cantilène improvisée
    - Improvisation sur le Te Deum
    - Fantaisie-Improvisation sur l'Ave maris stella
    - Choral-Improvisation sur le Victimae paschali
- Gabriel Fauré: Prelude of Pelléas et Mélisande, transcribed for organ solo
- Robert Schumann: Lamentation, transcribed for organ solo

== Sources ==
- Darasse, Xavier. "Maurice Duruflé", in Guide de la musique d'orgue, edited by Gilles Cantagrel. Paris: Fayard, 1991: 335–337.
- James E. Frazier, Maurice Duruflé: The Man & His Music (The Boydell Press 2007)
- Ronald Ebrecht, ed. Maurice Duruflé (1902–1986): The Last Impressionist. Lanham, MD: Scarecrow Press, 2002. ISBN 0-8108-4351-X.
- Jörg Abbing. Maurice Duruflé. Aspekte zu Leben und Werk. Verlag Peter Ewers, 2002. ISBN 3-928243-07-1.
- Frédéric Blanc. Maurice Duruflé. Souvenirs et autres écrits. Éditions Atlantica-Séguier, 2005. ISBN 2-84049-411-6.
