= Visions of Mana =

2024 video game

- Developer: Ouka Studios
- Publisher: Square Enix
- Directors: Ryosuke Yoshida; Kenji Ozawa; Naoto Miyadera
- Producers: Tetsuya Akatsuka; Masaru Oyamada
- Designers: Takahide Koizumi; Keita Takagi
- Artists: Haccan; Airi Yoshioka; Koichi Ishii
- Writers: Chihiro Ochiai; Tomoko Taniguchi; Kyoko Kitahara
- Composers: Hiroki Kikuta; Tsuyoshi Sekito; Ryo Yamazaki
- Series: Mana
- Engine: Unreal Engine 4
- Platforms: PlayStation 4; PlayStation 5; Windows; Xbox Series X/S
- Release: August 29, 2024
- Genre: Action role-playing
- Mode: Single-player

Visions of Mana (Note: Japanese: 聖剣伝説: ヴィジョンズ オブ マナ, Hepburn: Seiken Densetsu: Vuijonzu obu Mana; lit. The Legend of the Sacred Sword: Visions of Mana) is a 2024 action role-playing game developed by Ouka Studios, and published by Square Enix for PlayStation 4, PlayStation 5, Windows, and Xbox Series X/S. The fifth main title in the Mana series, the story follows young swordsman Val as he travels with a group of companions to renew the flow of Mana in the world. Gameplay combines action-based battles and exploring open areas, with elemental abilities used in both situations.

Development of Visions of Mana began in 2020, being the first mainline Mana game since Dawn of Mana (2006). The staff included multiple series veterans including series creator Koichi Ishii supervising monster designs, producer Masaru Oyamada, artist Haccan, and composers Hiroki Kikuta, Tsuyoshi Sekito, and Ryo Yamazaki. The gameplay and world design were intended to evoke elements from earlier Mana games. Upon release, game journalists praised the characters, combat system, and world design, while the story was seen as unoriginal.

== Gameplay ==
A combat encounter in Visions of Mana

Visions of Mana is an action role-playing game in which players take on the role of Val, a Soul Guard escorting a group to the Mana Tree. Up to three party members are playable while navigating different areas of the world. As the player travels through semi-open areas, they can also freely explore between town locations and dungeon areas. Save points activated during exploration can be used for fast travel. Outdoor environments have collectables and treasure chests, some of which are hidden behind platforming puzzles that can only be unlocked after acquiring the power of the game's eight Elementals. In addition to marked main quests, players can complete side quests given by non-playable characters, which may involve finding an item or person or defeating a designated enemy. Players can travel over land on foot or riding an animal mount, with additional options for riding a seafaring turtle or a flying dragon.

As with earlier Mana games, combat is action-based and triggered upon encountering enemies wandering the environment. Players can assume control of any member of a three-person party, each with their own unique skills and weapons, with the non-controlled characters behaving according to pre-set behaviour patterns. Standard combat involves light and heavy attacks, with items and combat abilities accessible through a ring menu. The controlled party member can also dodge and air dash. Character abilities in combat are unlocked using Element Points earned in combat within the Elemental Plot, which unlocks new moves and element-specific character classes. These classes are unlocked over the course of the game as Elementals ally with the party, with the class being different depending on which character the Elemental is assigned to. Some enemies have weaknesses that can be exploited through using items or specific elemental attacks.

Bonuses may be awarded based on the battle's completion time and whether damage was taken. Towns include vendors which sell items, equipment, and weapons. Party members can equip one weapon and one set of armour. Characters can also equip Ability Seeds, which alter their abilities and attributes, for example by improving one while decreasing another. Each character can unlock up to ten slots to equip Seeds. During combat, each character can accumulate and fill a Class Strike Gauge, allowing them to unleash a class-specific ability for high damage.

== Synopsis ==
=== Setting and characters ===
Visions of Mana takes place in the fantasy world Qi'Diel, where several coexisting species are sustained by the Mana Tree, an incarnation of the Goddess of Mana. Every four years, a being dubbed the Faerie travels to one of the eight villages tied to the eight Elementals, spirits linked to the flow of Mana. The Faerie chooses one villager as an "Alm" who will go on a pilgrimage to restore the flow of Mana through their sacrifice, travelling under the guardianship of a Soul Guard soldier.

The game stars two protagonists from the Fire Village of Tianeea: Hinna, the Alm of Fire on her pilgrimage to the Mana Tree, and her childhood friend Val who joins her as her Soul Guard. Their other companions are Morley, a cat demi-human from Etaern who seeks to overcome a traumatic event from his past; Careena, a spirited dragon demi-human from Longren; Palamena, queen of the water capital Illystana; and the sproutling Julei. Other characters include Eoren, a traveller from the Earth Village Gudju: Aesh, an enthusiastic scholar; and Daelophos, a legendary champion of the Goddess of Mana. The antagonists of the story are the Benevodons, eight elemental monsters from the distant past.

=== Plot ===
A prologue shows Eoren and his lover Lyza, the Alm of Earth, attempting to escape the Earth Village of Gudju; they fail and Lyza is petrified. An unspecified time later, Hinna is chosen as the Alm of Fire, with Val becoming her Soul Guard. As they journey towards the Mana Tree, they meet and are accompanied by Careena and Morley. Together, they aid Queen Palamena in protecting the city of Illystana from an attempted coup by the magistrate Passar. Along the way they gain the aid of the Elementals, who choose Careena, Morley and Palamena as the Alms of Wind, the Moon, and Water respectively. They also meet with Eoren, who tells them the legend of the Mana Sword wielded by the Goddess's chosen hero, from a time when Alms were not needed. After helping Palamena, Eoren tricks Val and Hinna into going with him, then kills Hinna to gain her corestone—a crystallization of life essence—to awaken the Mana Sword and release Lyza from petrification.

Initially in shock, Val decides to continue guarding the other Alms and hoping to find a way to restore Hinna. During this next journey they make contact with Aesh, who eventually is chosen as the Alm of Shadow. Reaching the Sanctuary of Mana, they meet with Julei, whom the Elementals choose as the Alm of Wood. Attempting to reach the Mana Tree, they run into Eoren as he uses Hinna's corestone to awaken the Mana Sword, which releases Daelophos from a stone prison. Daelophos takes the Mana Sword and releases the Benevodons to reclaim parts of his old power, killing Eoren and Lyza in the process. The group begins confronting the Benevodons, during which Val is chosen as the Alm of Light. Wishing to learn Daelophos's goals, the group return to the Mana Tree to meet with Khoda, spirit of the first Soul Guard and Val's ancestor. From Khoda and magical visions in ancient ruins, the group learn that the fragmented realms of Fa'Diel were merged into Qi'Diel when a war depleted the flow of Mana, unleashing the enraged Benevodons. Daelophos became the Goddess's champion and sealed away the Benevodons, but his lover Cerulia was murdered, driving him to seek revenge on humanity by killing the Goddess before Khoda sacrificed himself to seal Daelophos away. The Alms' sacrifices sustained the sleeping Goddess, who lost her strength preserving the merged world and suppressing Daelophos's anger, until someone would come with the will to create a new fate for Qi'Diel.

The party defeats the eight Benevodons, re-awakening their will to better the world. They then unsuccessfully confront Daelophos, who breaks the Mana Sword before leaving for the Sanctuary to kill the Goddess. The group pursues and defeats Daelophos by the Tree of Mana, and Val strikes the final blow with the Mana Sword, repaired by the dead within the Mana Tree including Hinna and Eoren. Daelophos concedes, reuniting with Cerulia's spirit before the two pass on, with the awakened Goddess promising they will reunite in new lives. Val uses the Mana Sword's power to wish for a world where Alms are not needed. Mid-credit scenes show Mana flowing freely through the world and the Alms helping with reconstruction. In the post-credits scene, Val dies of old age and reunites with Hinna as the Goddess of Mana. A post-game scenario follows the group before the final battle as Passar attempts another coup using the dark dragon Aeve Zalaha; Aeve Zalaha awakens, killing Passar, but the party defeats him.

== Development ==
Visions of Mana forms part of Square Enix's action-oriented Mana series, which had released on handheld and home consoles between 1991 and 2007, and continued during the 2010s through mobile titles and remakes. The last mainline title prior to Visions of Mana was Dawn of Mana (2006) for the PlayStation 2. Masaru Oyamada, who became series producer with Rise of Mana (2014), was eager to develop a new mainline title. Oyamada knew there was fan demand for a new entry, though opinion was divided over whether to model it on Secret of Mana (1993) or Trials of Mana (1995). Oyamada used a number of Mana remakes and remasters to gauge player interest and feedback. Oyamada was hesitant about developing Visions of Mana due to the amount of time since Dawn of Mana, but gained confidence following positive reactions to the Trials of Mana remake.

Production of Visions of Mana began in 2020. Lasting four years, there were difficulties both with communication between the Japanese and Chinese parts of the team, and the impact of the COVID-19 pandemic. Production was handled by Ouka Studios, a Japanese-Chinese subdivision of NetEase headed by Tetsuya Akatsuka. Oyamada, who knew Akatsuka, contacted Ouka Studios to develop Visions of Mana. Ouka Studios' Ryosuke Yoshida and Kenji Ozawa were co-directors; Yoshida worked on the gameplay elements, while Ozawa supervised world design and story. The staff included multiple Chinese staff members who had worked on Japanese projects. Unreal Engine 4 was used for the game, as many of the Chinese staff members were familiar with it and it allowed for quick creation of environments and gameplay scenarios.

The gameplay was intended to combine the series' established action role-playing elements, and the use of multiple platforming and elemental puzzle mechanics present in Dawn of Mana. They wanted to give players greater freedom with exploration, something that had been lacking in the Trials of Mana remake. During early testing, when the team decided to include height-based combat mechanics, the use of elemental spirit powers was heavily incorporated. The spirit powers used in the final game were chosen based on how much fun they would be for players to use. At Oyamada's request, the team considered a multiplayer feature, but it was dropped due to the potential impact on player progression through the world and story.

Describing the story, Oyamada said its main theme was a new angle on the themes of nature's laws influencing human lives, along with a series-wide theme of growth through partings and unconditional love. Oyamada was inspired by the game's settings first, then created the characters based on their locations. The characters were designed by Haccan, who had redesigned characters for recent Mana remakes. The monsters were designed by Airi Yoshioka, who had worked on multiple Mana titles including Dawn of Mana. Series creator Koichi Ishii, whose last work on the series was Heroes of Mana (2007), returned to oversee classic monster redesigns. Ishii also created the dog mount Pikul. Describing their approach to the visuals, Oyamada felt they created an artistic style which captured the multiple identities found within the Mana series, which had consciously varied its art and gameplay across multiple games. The design of open areas was intended to evoke the artwork created for earlier entries by Hiroo Isono. Multiple visual and stylistic elements were incorporated from other Mana titles, such as species from Legend of Mana (1999).

=== Music ===
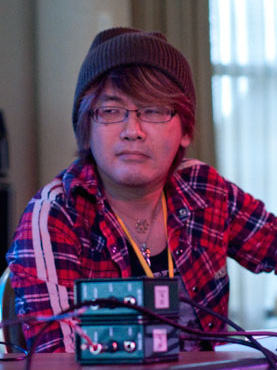
Hiroki Kikuta (pictured in 2011), a series veteran, co-composed the soundtrack for Visions of Mana.

The music of Visions of Mana was co-composed by Hiroki Kikuta, Tsuyoshi Sekito, and Ryo Yamazaki, all of whom had composed or arranged music for previous Mana titles. Kikuta was mostly in charge of cutscene tracks, Sekito handled combat themes, and Yamazaki wrote environmental and exploration music. Composition began in 2020 during early concepts, when Kikuta was contacted by Oyamada about a new title. Kikuta's first track was the game's main theme, "Ties of Fate", which informed the overall musical direction.

Yamazaki drew inspiration from concept art given to the composers early in production, and the overarching theme of a journey across the world. Kikuta described his role as creating music symbolizing the Mana Tree, a significant presence in the game's world. Sekito was conscious that his themes would "break" the musical flow, so wanted to create themes that would energise players and consulted with Yamazaki while creating them. Yamazaki described his work on the game as a continuation of his parallel work on Echoes of Mana (2022), focusing on acoustic elements and creating a consistency by incorporating melodies from that game. His environmental tracks had minimal direction, mostly key words such as "light" and "wind".

A notable vocal theme was "Now and For Always", which Yamazaki composed based on lyrics created by one of the scenario writers. Due to the lyrics not fitting well into the song, Yamazaki asked for them to be rewritten. He also had to keep the English version in mind when creating the music. The music was orchestrated by Sachiko Miyano of Shangri-La Inc., with whom Kikuta had worked on earlier projects. A five-disc album, Seiken Densetsu: Visions of Mana Original Soundtrack, was released by Square Enix on September 11, 2024.

== Release ==
Development of a new mainline Mana title was confirmed during a 30th anniversary livestream for the series hosted by Square Enix. It was officially unveiled at The Game Awards in December 2023. The game's title, suggested by the localization team, was intended to both incorporate the different Japanese and Western name conventions, and reference the different character viewpoints in the story. The "V" letter also coincidentally made reference to the roman numeral five. An expanded look was featured in the January 2024 Xbox Developer Direct.

Visions of Mana had both a standard edition, and a special edition with additional bonuses including in-game costumes and music from earlier Mana games. A demo covering a section of the game was released on July 30, 2024, with players receiving bonus weapons in the full release if they had save data from the demo. It was released for PlayStation 4, PlayStation 5, Windows, and Xbox Series X/S on August 29. On the day of the game's release, it was reported Ouka Studio was being closed down by its parent company NetEase as part of a scaling back by Chinese companies that had invested in Japanese game development.

== Reception ==
Reception

Aggregate scores
Aggregator	Score
Metacritic	PS5: 75/100; PC: 75/100
OpenCritic	71% recommend

Review scores
Publication	Score
Famitsu	8/10, 9/10, 9/10, 8/10
GameSpot	5/10
GamesRadar+	2.5/5
IGN	8/10
PC Gamer (US)	77/100
RPGamer	4.5/5
RPGFan	87%
RPG Site	8/10

In its debut week in Japan, Visions of Mana sold over 40,000 copies on PS5 and PS4, with both versions appearing in the top ten best-selling games for that week. In their end of quarter fiscal report, Square Enix described the game's sales as "weaker-than-expected", attributing it to a fall in sales profits in their HD games division for the second quarter of 2024. Visions of Mana received "generally favorable" reviews for the PS5 and PC versions from critics according to review aggregator website Metacritic.

Luis Mauricio of RPGamer was very positive about the story and cast, praising the references to earlier Mana titles and its approachability for both series veterans and newcomers. IGN's Nick Ransbottom enjoyed the story's simplicity, characters, and ending, while criticizing moments of heavy exposition. Cullen Black of RPG Site was disappointed by the story's conventional approach to its premise, but praised the cast and several emotional scenes. One of the reviewers for Japanese gaming magazine Famitsu commented that the storyline brought them to tears. Izzy Parsons of RPGFan highlighted the game's setting, characters, and themes of sacrifice, while feeling that the plot was sometimes too "safe". Autumn Wright of GamesRadar+ found the overall story unoriginal and felt both the main and supporting cast lacked any standout characters. GameSpot's Imran Khan criticized the story's pacing, depth, and lack of bold ideas, causing the characters to appear as "poorly-written caricatures".

Ransbottom cited the combat as the best part of Visions of Mana due to the customization possible with its classes, and enjoyed exploring the open areas. Black came to greatly enjoy the combat system after an initial learning curve, and found quest design "standard but strong overall." Mauricio enjoyed the game's combat and character classes, and additionally praised the environmental puzzle elements. Parsons similarly praised the customization options available, but found dungeon environments overly simple to navigate. The Famitsu reviewers also felt the combat was enjoyable, if lacking in both innovation and interesting movement options. Khan positively noted the class system's variety, but criticized the controls for their input delay and difficulty. Wright felt combat was too cluttered with independent systems, and described the progression as repetitive and exploration as uninteresting.

The environment and art design was a common point of praise among the Famitsu reviewers, and one further highlighted the music as reinforcing the story's emotional moments. Black described the environments as "true works of art", calling the visuals some of the Mana series' best. Ransbottom lauded the game's artistic design, positively comparing the visuals to those from an old storybook. Parsons described the environment and art design as some of the best available in video games, and gave praise to the soundtrack. Wright praised the game world's design, and the English cast's performances. Mauricio was positive about the art and character design, enjoying both the music and the English cast as helping reinforce the game's atmosphere. While Khan was unimpressed with the music and voice acting, he praised the game's art and world design. Multiple reviewers noted minor and varied graphical or technical issues with their versions of the game.
