= Rise of Mana =

2014 video game

- Official artwork
- Developer: Goshow (Note: Supervision by Square Enix. Additional work by Fixer.)
- Publisher: Square Enix
- Director: Masato Yagi
- Producer: Masaru Oyamada
- Artists: Taiki; Ryota Murayama; Haccan
- Writer: Masato Yagi
- Composer: Tsuyoshi Sekito
- Series: Mana
- Engine: Unity
- Platforms: iOS, Android, PlayStation Vita
- Release: iOS: JP: March 6, 2014; Android: JP: June 26, 2014; PlayStation Vita: JP: May 14, 2015
- Genre: Action role-playing
- Modes: Single-player, multiplayer

Rise of Mana (Note: Known in Japan as Seiken Densetsu: Rise of Mana (聖剣伝説 ライズ·オブ·マナ, Seiken Densetsu: Raizu obu Mana; lit. The Legend of the Sacred Sword: Rise of Mana)) is a Japanese action role-playing video game developed by Goshow for iOS, Android and PlayStation Vita. It was published by series creator Square Enix in 2014 for mobile devices and 2015 for the Vita. It is the eleventh game in the Mana series, featuring a new narrative unconnected to other games in the series. The gameplay uses a similar action-based battle system to earlier Mana titles while using a free-to-play model in common with mobile titles. The story focuses on two characters, an angel and a demon, who are cast down to the mortal world in the midst of a battle and are forced to share a body in order to survive.

The game began development in 2012: the project began when Masaru Oyamada told series producer Koichi Ishii that he could create a legitimate entry in the Mana series for mobile platforms. His idea was for a game true to the series that would reach a wide audience. The game's multiplayer, inspired by that used in Secret of Mana, was developed using the Photon Server middleware. The art director was series newcomer Hiroyuki Suzuki, while the character, monster and others designs were done by Taiki, Ryota Murayama and Haccan respectively. The music was composed by a team led by Tsuyoshi Sekito, while the theme song was written and performed by singer-songwriter Kokia.

First announced in February 2014, it was released the following month on iOS. The Android release followed several months later. The Vita port released the following year. By April 2015, the mobile version had over two million active players, and later the Vita version achieved 150,000 downloads by August 2015. It received generally positive opinions from critics: while many praised its graphics, story and gameplay, there were opinions that it was not a worthy part of the Mana series. The game was discontinued in March 2016.

== Gameplay ==
Gameplay in Rise of Mana: the character in its Angel form tackles common enemies.

Rise of Mana is an action role-playing game where the player takes control of two protagonists inhabiting a single body: the characters' genders and names can be customized prior to beginning the game. During gameplay, the character can switch between angelic and demonic forms: this enables the player to see thoughts in different non-player characters (NPCs), with each form showing different types of thought or prompting a different reaction from NPCs. The game uses a free-to-play gaming model: while the game can be downloaded and played for free, players have the option of spending money on in-game items. The characters' base is a room in a small village: in the room, players can check messages, and set their current equipment and weapons. A message board in the town provides access to social features. In the town, NPC-run shops enable the crafting of new weapons and equipment in exchange for in-game currency, along with the buying and selling of various in-game items.

There are four types of available quests, most of which are accepted from NPCs: main quests which advance the story, quests with a time limit that disappear after a certain period, challenge quests that pit the player against hordes of enemies, and raid battles against bosses. Each quest consumes a part of the player characters' "mental energy", a stamina meter that refills as real-world time passes. Gems can be bought and used to refill it faster. When the characters gain an experience level, the meter is recharged completely. As each scenario and quest is completed or when new quests are available, the game's map is automatically updated. After selecting a quest, a player chooses one of a number of "familiars", creatures that aid the player in battle and grant stat boosts.

Rise of Mana uses an action-based battle system similar to other entries in the Mana series: navigation and actions occur in real time within battlefields rendered to the scale of characters within it. After each battle, treasure chests are unlocked which can contain items or new familiars. During battle, the character can attack, switching forms to deliver different attacks, and dodge enemy attacks when correctly timed. During battle, assigned abilities are displayed in the lower right-hand corner of the screen. After each skill is used in battle, a cooldown meter is activated. The skill cannot be used again until the meter is empty. Three types of weapons are available in-game: swords, spears and bows. Each weapon, when equipped, grants a different skill and elemental attribute. The elemental attributes can be used against monsters aligned with a vulnerable element. Enemies can also be weak to attacks using certain weapons. In addition to single-player battles, raid battles allow up to eight players to participate using an online connection.

== Synopsis ==
=== Setting and characters ===
The story takes place in a variation of the Mana high fantasy setting, and is divided between the human and the spirit realms. In the spirit realm, two opposing factions face each other in eternal battle: the angelic Rasta and the demonic Daruka. The main protagonists are the chosen champions of each of their races. (Note: The protagonists' default names are Rain (male)/Aria(female) and Van (male)/Isis (female).) The two are forced to confront agents sent from the spirit realm by each side to retrieve them: the archangel knight Vibra and the warrior demon Toryu. Another major character is Folon, a being known as the "goddess of time". According to the game's director, Foron is not a goddess in the fullest sense, as the world's true goddess could be said to be "Mana" itself.

=== Plot ===
The game opens with a battle between the respective Champions of Light and Darkness in front of the Mana Tree. While they are fighting near a Mana waterfall, they are swept by it into the mortal world. There, their power is drastically diminished and their existence is threatened. The two decide to make a temporary alliance, sharing a body until they can find their way back to the spirit world. During their journey, they become the protectors of a local village. The pair eventually become the heirs to the mystical Mana Sword. The main campaign was delivered in chapters. The original main campaign, which involved a battle with the hostile Folon, lasted for twenty chapters. Following this, new campaign missions were issued following the characters' mission to confront threats using the Mana Sword. At the end of the game, the Champions confront Folon at the Mana Tree, along with Vibra and Toryu. After their final confrontation, Foron willingly disperses after she and Mana explain why they summoned the Champions: to bring them together through circumstance and pave the way for peace between the Rasta and Daruka. Having become friends through their journey, the Champions agree to bring peace, and return to their own realms.

== Development ==
Rise of Mana was the brainchild of Square Enix producer Masaru Oyamada, who had made a name for himself within the company working in its mobile division on mobile ports of Final Fantasy Adventure and Secret of Mana. Speaking with series producer Koichi Ishii, Oyamada said that he could create an original mobile title that would be a legitimate entry in the series. Instead of a social or card-based game, which were the most prevalent genres in mobile gaming at the time, Oyamada wanted to create an action role-playing game that was accessible to a large number of casual gamers, something which would worry him throughout its production. The main staff were made up of Oyamada, director Masato Yagi, and art director Hiroyuki Suzuki. Hiroyuki had previously only worked on the Final Fantasy series. After the initial release of Rise of Mana, Yagi was responsible for the main scenario alongside Oyamada and post-launch content producer Naofumi Takuma. Oyamada also initially tried to bring Chaos Rings producer Takehiro Ando on board, but Ando would have nothing to do with the project. Development began in July 2012. The game was constructed using the Unity engine. In addition to staff from Square Enix, main development was done by Japanese developer Goshow, and its server security and technical assistance was handled by Fixer. The protagonists and some NPCs were designed by Japanese artist Taiki, while another artist Ryota Murayama handled NPC and monster designs. The game's key art was created by in-house designer Dairaku Masahiko: he was brought in after regular Mana key art illustrator Hiroo Isono died in 2013. Masahiko was asked by Oyamada to create something similar to Isono's previous artwork in creating a representation of pointillism. The game's title was indicative of the title's nature as a new entry in the Mana series; other than a small card-battle mobile game in 2013, Circle of Mana, Rise was the first Mana title since Heroes of Mana in 2007.

Rise of Mana was intended to reach a wide audience, gaining an attention only previously seen by Dawn of Mana in 2006. The concept of the main character switching between angelic and demonic form was suggested by Yagi. The original concept was to keep both characters in separate bodies, with the unoccupied character being controlled by the game's artificial intelligence. The team used the Photon Server middleware to develop the game's multiplayer component. The development team initially thought of creating custom middleware, but the rebuild needed would have taken a whole year, threatening the project's existence. In search of suitable middleware, the team contacted Fixer, who offered them the use of multiple options including Photon Server. Trying out Photon Server, all the problems faced by the developers were resolved within a two-month period, and the middleware's inbuilt security structure and specification match with the game persuaded the project's engineers to greenlight its use. Rise of Mana was the first Japanese game to use Photon Server. The team needed to create two different specifications for iOS and Android, as Android had higher graphical power. During the early development stage, the team thought it would be fun to re-create the multiplayer elements in Secret of Mana. The initial idea was to have multiplayer available in standard quests, but this took up too much operational space to be practical, so they reduced this to raid battles. Due to the use of Photon Server, additional player characters could be fully rendered rather than appearing as ghost-like transparent helpers.

Development of the PlayStation Vita port began shortly before the start of the game's service in 2014. The team formed a partnership with Sony to develop the title, but production ran into difficulties as the team attempted to create an experience of the same quality as the mobile version, along with adjusting the controls from touch-based to the button and joystick controls of the Vita. There was also some resistance from staff surrounding the usage of the Mana franchise and Oyamada's determination to bring Rise of Mana to consoles in the face of suggestions that it would be better to make a completely new game. When the project was proposed to Sony, the Unity technology built into the Vita was fairly new and did not make full use of the platform's processing power. In addition, the staff were unused to the version of Unity for the Vita. The team needed cooperation from both Sony and Unity Technologies to optimize the engine so the game could run on the new platform. By the time of the Vita version's announcement, only the preliminary development work had been completed, but development was proceeding according to plan. Technical troubles related to the game's performance persisted beyond this point, resulting in the release being delayed into the following year.

=== Music ===
Seiken Densetsu: Rise of Mana Original Soundtrack

Soundtrack album by Tsuyoshi Sekito, Kenji Ito, Hiroki Kikuta, Yoko Shimomura, Yasuhiro Yamanaka, and Kokia
- Released: April 24, 2014
- Genre: Video game soundtrack
- Length: 1:07:04
- Label: Square Enix Music

The music of Rise of Mana was composed by a group of different composers: the majority of the music was handled by Tsuyoshi Sekito. In addition to Sekito, the soundtrack was also contributed to by three previous Mana composers: Kenji Ito (Final Fantasy Adventure, Children of Mana, Dawn of Mana), Hiroki Kikuta (Secret of Mana, Trials of Mana) and Yoko Shimomura (Legend of Mana, Heroes of Mana). Also joining the team was sound engineer Yasuhiro Yamanaka. In all, 21 out of the 28 composed pieces were done by Sekito. Ito, Kikuta, Shimomura and Yamanaka each contributed one track. The soundtrack featured an arrangement for piano of "Rising Sun", the series' main theme. Yamanaka acted as sound director, while poro@lier created the piano arrangements for both "Rising Sun" and the game's theme song.

The game's theme song, "Believe in the Spirit", was composed, written and sung by Japanese singer-songwriter Kokia. Prior to coming on board, she had little knowledge of the Mana series. As with her previous compositions for video games, Kokia tried to get a feel for the game's atmosphere before starting, either through playing the game directly or looking at behind-the-scenes material related to the game's world. With "Believe in the Spirit", she worked to create a song that would appeal to both players and the production team. The track was performed using strings, a tin whistle, an acoustic guitar and percussion. The arrangement was done by Mina Kubota.

Seiken Densetsu: Rise of Mana Original Soundtrack was released on April 24, 2014 through Square Enix's music label. Andrew Barker of RPGFan was cautiously positive about the album: he described "Believe in the Spirit" as being "hit-or-miss" for different listeners while evoking memories of earlier Mana games. The rest of the soundtrack was generally praised: the first half's restful melodies were the stand-out tracks and said to be the strongest, while the later upbeat tracks were praised for their various energizing qualities. Some tracks, such as "The Drip Drip Drip of Memory", he called fairly weak and forgettable. Barker generally compared the music to that of Final Fantasy XII, recommending it for fans of the latter and finishing that the album was generally good despite some unmemorable pieces. Chris Greening of Video Game Music Online gave the album a 2.5-star rating out of five: he was most positive about the tracks from the guest composers like Ito and Shimomura. While he praised Sekito for moving away from his traditional musical style, he felt that the result was fairly mixed, with some tracks lacking the proper emotional drive and others "falling flat". "Believe in the Spirit" was praised for avoiding J-pop elements and sticking with its Celtic style, being favorably compared to the theme songs of Xenogears. Overall, Green felt that, while it had good production value and was substantially better than other mobile game soundtracks, but lacked the emotional impact of previous Mana titles in the majority of its tracks. Many reviewers of the game also praised the soundtrack. A second album, subtitled Additional Tracks, was released by Square Enix at selected events on September 17, 2015.

== Release ==
The game's existence was first hinted at when a trademark for the title was registered. Similar trademarks were registered in Europe and North America. The game was officially announced by Square Enix in an issue of Famitsu magazine in February 2014. The game's service began on March 6, 2014 for iOS. The version for Android released nearly three months later on June 25. A version for the Vita was announced later in 2014, originally scheduled for the fourth quarter of that year. Due to technical difficulties, the Vita port needed to be delayed well into the following year, and was eventually released on May 14, 2015. Pre-registration was made available from May 10.

During its lifetime, Rise of Mana entered multiple collaborations with other games both for mobiles and other platforms: these included Final Fantasy Agito, Bravely Default, Final Fantasy Tactics: The War of the Lions, Final Fantasy Adventure and Diffusion Million Arthur. In January 2016, it was announced that Rise of Mana would cease operation on all platforms on March 31. In the release, Square Enix said that a developing imbalance between content quality and revenue, in addition to problems with future content creation, had convinced them that Rise of Mana was no longer a profitable concern. Despite it ending service as a free-to-play title, the company was looking into alternative ways of distributing the title. A final story episode was released prior to the game's closure, and its final cinematic was released online through Square Enix Japan's YouTube channel on March 28.

== Reception ==
Reception

Review scores
Publication	Score
Famitsu	28/40 (Vita)
AppGet	4/5 stars

Within the first few days of operation, Rise of Mana had 500,000 active players. Within a month of its release, that number had increased to one million registered players. In an interview, Oyamada said that sales of the title had increased with the release of more powerful mobile devices. By May 2015, the smartphone versions had over two million registered players. The Vita version was similarly successful: within two months of release, it had been downloaded 100,000 times. That figure rose by an additional 50,000 over the following month.

Japanese reviews of the title have been generally positive. Famitsu generally praised several aspects, but found the item management and weapon structures confusing, saying that it did not live up to the legacy of the Mana series. Reviewing the Vita port, Famitsu praised the game's general ease of play and use of the Mana series, but the button layout was criticized. Kyōsuke Takano of AppGet praised the gameplay and graphics, noting that the game avoided the possible pitfalls of being a mobile game while delivering a strong experience. His one point of reservation was that he would have preferred the game on another platform. 4Gamer.net praised the variety of control options, the feel of gameplay, and the graphics. The writer noted that the game should be played on more advanced mobiles despite recommendations, as the graphics and performance suffered on older smartphone models.

Opinions from western journalists have echoed many of those from Japanese reviewers. Christopher Allison, writing for tech website Tech in Asia, was highly positive about the game, saying his last experience of this kind was when playing the 1998 game The Legend of Zelda: Ocarina of Time: he greatly enjoyed the battle system despite the touch controls sometimes working against the player, and referred to the environments as "wonderfully drawn". Shaun Musgrave of TouchArcade, in a preview of the game, echoed other reviewers' opinions on the graphics and gameplay, and hoped that Square Enix would both handle it wisely and bring it overseas. Kerry Brunskill, in an article for Nintendo Life, referred to the story as "engaging", and again held similar sentiments as other reviewers about the graphics and gameplay. She noted that the game stood out from others of its kind due to its overall quality.
