= Children of Mana =

2006 action role-playing video game for the Nintendo DS

- North American box art
- Developers: Square Enix; Nex Entertainment
- Publishers: JP: Square Enix; WW: Nintendo
- Director: Yoshiki Ito
- Producers: Takashi Orikata; Katsuji Aoyama
- Designer: Koichi Ishii
- Artists: Nao Ikeda; Airi Yoshioka; Ryoma Ito; Hiroo Isono
- Writer: Masato Kato
- Composers: Kenji Ito; Masaharu Iwata; Takayuki Aihara
- Series: Mana
- Platform: Nintendo DS
- Release: JP: March 2, 2006; NA: October 30, 2006; AU: December 7, 2006; EU: January 12, 2007
- Genre: Action role-playing
- Modes: Single-player, multiplayer

Children of Mana (Note: Known in Japan as Seiken Densetsu DS: Children of Mana (聖剣伝説(せいけんでんせつ)DS チルドレンオブマナ, Seiken Densetsu Dī Esu: Chirudoren obu Mana; lit. The Legend of the Sacred Sword DS: Children of Mana).) is a 2006 action role-playing game developed by Square Enix and Nex Entertainment and published by Square Enix and Nintendo for the Nintendo DS. It is a spin-off of the Mana series and the first entry in the World of Mana subseries. Set in a high fantasy universe, Children of Mana follows one of four young heroes as they combat an invasion of monsters and learn about the cataclysmic event that killed their families.

While it reprises the action role-playing elements of previous Mana games, such as real-time battle sequences, Children of Mana features an increased focus on user-friendliness. Unlike earlier Mana titles, Children is a heavily action-oriented dungeon crawler, in which the player progresses by completing randomly generated levels. Both the main plot and side-quests require the player to fight through dungeons and defeat boss monsters before returning to the central Mana Village. Like many of its predecessors, the game features a local cooperative multiplayer component.

Children of Mana was designed by series creator Koichi Ishii, directed by Yoshiki Ito, and produced by Takashi Orikata and Katsuji Aoyama. The game was a moderate commercial success: it sold 100,000 copies in its first week of release, and more than 280,000 in Japan by the end of 2006. While critics praised the graphics and music as beautiful and unique, they found the combat simplistic and repetitive, and the story insubstantial.

== Gameplay ==
A battle featuring four players. The top screen displays the battle and the player's statistics, while the bottom screen shows a map and the current objectives.

Like previous games in the Mana series, Children of Mana features a top-down perspective in which characters navigate terrain and fight off hostile creatures. Each character has ratings: the damage they do with magic, how fast they can attack, and the amount of health and mana they have. The game plays out nearly identically regardless which character is chosen, except for a few quests specific to one character. Unlike previous games in the series, the main character typically has no companions; however, there is a cooperative multiplayer option for up to four (local WiFi; progress saved on only the host's machine).

Unlike previous games in the series, which were more typical action role-playing games, Children of Mana is a dungeon crawler, and the majority of the gameplay takes place in selected locations rather than on an open world map. The player selects these areas on the world map to reach them. The primary objective in each location is to clear the dungeon of monsters. Each dungeon is divided into different randomly generated floors, and to progress between each zone, the player must find an item called a Gleamdrop, then carry it to a pillar of light called a Gleamwell. The player must repeat this process on each floor of the dungeon until the last floor is reached, where a boss monster lies. The player can not return to previous floors unless they die or leave the dungeon; upon returning, they start the dungeon over at the beginning. When not clearing dungeons, the player stays in the Mana Village, which contains shops to purchase equipment. Dungeons can be returned to later by accepting quests from townsfolk in the Dudbear shop. During these quests, the dungeon itself is slightly altered: the player's starting position may be different, the number of floors can change, and the monsters and boss monster contained may change. Like the main quests, Dudbear quests involve clearing the dungeon of monsters, sometimes to acquire an item from the end of the dungeon.

The game retains the real-time battle mechanics of previous games in the Mana series. The game sports four weapons with their own unique abilities: sword, flail, bow and arrow, and hammer. The player can have two weapons ready to attack with at a time, and any of the four character options can use any weapon. The player can change which weapons they have available at any time. Each weapon has standard normal attacks, special attacks, and fury attacks. The fury attacks are the strongest and require a full Fury Gauge to use, which is filled by striking enemies with standard attacks and taking damage from enemies. Different weapons can have different effects on the environment, such as the hammer's ability to smash pots. In addition to weapons, the player can select from one of eight Elementals, which provide different magical attacks and magical enhancements to weapon attacks. The player can switch between Elementals in the Mana Village. Elemental attacks can be made stronger by equipping Gems, which can also boost the player's attributes.

== Plot ==
=== Setting and characters ===
Children of Mana takes place in the world of Fa'diel, split into the five continents of Jadd, Topple, Wendell, Ishe, and Lorimar, as well as the island of Illusia. At the center of that island, the beginning point of the game, stands the Tree of Mana. Several years ago, an event known the "great disaster" took place at the base of the Mana Tree and many people died. During this event, a brave young boy and girl used the Sword of Mana to save the world from disaster. Now, one of a group of orphans sets out to investigate the details of the event that killed their families.

The four main characters of Children of Mana are Ferrik, Tamber, Poppen, and Wanderer. They all live together in the Mana Village, near the Mana Tree.

- Ferrik is a fifteen-year-old boy, a knight who is said to be brave, bright and cheerful. He lost his parents and sister in the great disaster. After his life was saved by a knight, he has been honing his skills with the sword, his weapon of choice.
- Tamber is a sixteen-year-old girl, a dancer with a sense of truth and justice, and an air of maturity about her. She lost her parents and little brother due to the great disaster. Tamber's weapon of choice is the bow.
- Poppen is a stubborn and fearless nine-year-old boy, who lost his mother at birth and his father in the great disaster. Poppen's weapon of choice is the flail.
- Wanderer is a traveling merchant, a tradition kept throughout the series. He is a member of the Niccolo tribe of rabbit/cat people who lost his family due to the king of Lorimar during the great disaster. Wanderer's weapon of choice is the hammer.

=== Story ===
One day, following a flash of light, the stone at the base of the Mana Tree cracks, distorting time and space. The hero recalls that their friend Tess, who is a priestess, went to the Mana Tower to pray, and goes to find her. After reaching the tower with an Elemental in tow, the hero finds the tower is infested with monsters. Upon fighting their way to the top of the tower, the hero finds Tess, frightened but unharmed. Suddenly, a giant flaming bird descends upon the two. The hero attempts to fight it, but finds that the bird is protected by a barrier. A sword then falls from the sky, causing the bird's shield to fade away and allowing the hero to slay the beast. When the bird is defeated, a mysterious man garbed in black appears and attempts to take the Holy Sword, which is still stuck in the ground, but is prevented by the appearance of a barrier when he tries. The man disappears, and the hero attempts to grab the sword. No barrier appears to prevent them, and they take what turns out to be the fabled Sword of Mana.

Upon returning from the Mana Tower, the hero discovers that three mysterious pillars of light have struck in the lands of Topple, Jadd, and Lorimar. After being asked by the leaders of the village, the hero investigates these places and finds dungeons full of monsters with a huge monster at the end. After these three tasks are completed, the mysterious man appears once again, identifying himself as the Mana Lord. He steals the Sword of Mana and causes a large storm in the land of Wendel. The hero journeys there to stop the Mana Storm by confronting the Mana Lord. When the Mana Lord is about to kill the hero, a group of gems appear around the hero to prevent his attack. The Mana Lord then decides to kidnap Tess and vanishes.

After returning to the Mana Village, the hero heads for the Path of Life under the roots of the Mana Tree. At the end of the Path, the hero finds the Mana Lord waiting, and the two fight. Upon his defeat, the Mana Lord reveals that he was one of the two children of Mana who had saved the world during the great disaster, and rather than trying to hurt anyone, he was simply trying to fulfill the reason he was created: "to fill the world with the power of Mana". He tells the hero the other child of Mana is spreading disaster through the world and must be stopped. He proceeds to give the Sword of Mana to the hero, then commits suicide by throwing himself off a cliff. This shift in power causes a rift to open in the sky, where the second child of Mana is waiting. The hero destroys this second child, the Scion of Mana, restoring the world to peace.

In the aftermath, Tess and the Elementals are entrusted with care of Illusia, while everyone else must leave. Moti says Illusia will be protected as a haven and that humans will not return for many more years. They embark to Jadd to start a new life in a new world.

== Development ==
In 2003, Square Enix began a drive to begin developing "polymorphic content", a marketing and sales strategy to "[provide] well-known properties on several platforms, allowing exposure of the products to as wide an audience as possible". The first of these was the Compilation of Final Fantasy VII, and Square Enix intended to have campaigns for other series whereby multiple games in different genres would be developed simultaneously. Although no such project for the Mana series had been announced by this point, it was announced in late 2004 that an unnamed Mana game was in development for the upcoming Nintendo DS platform. In early 2005, Square Enix announced a "World of Mana" project, the application of this "polymorphic content" idea to the Mana franchise, which would include several games across different genres and platforms. These games, as with the rest of the series, would not be direct sequels or prequels to one another, even if appearing so at first glance, but would instead share thematic connections. The first release in this project and the sixth release in the Mana series was announced in September 2005 as Children of Mana for the DS.

Children of Mana was developed by Nex Entertainment, who had previously created dungeon crawl games in the Shining series, in collaboration with Square Enix. It was designed by series creator Koichi Ishii, directed by Yoshiki Ito, and produced by Takashi Orikata and Katsuji Aoyama. The game features an opening cinematic by Production I.G. The game was planned from the start as a "fun-for-all action type game" taking advantage of the DS's capabilities. Ishii was especially focused on creating a truly cooperative multiplayer game, which he had wanted to create since Secret of Mana (1993), the second game in the series. Despite this, he chose not to utilize the DS's Nintendo Wi-Fi functionality in order to effect an experience in which players would interact with people in the near vicinity rather than remotely, in congruence with the local multiplayer found in Secret of Mana. He also designed the multiplayer to create a sense of chaotic excitement, such that players could interact without focusing on the difficulty or competing against each other. Several of the game's design choices were meant to focus more on the action components, such as attacks sending enemies flying across the screen and the use of both the buttons and stylus to keep the controls simple and directly connected to the action. The randomly generated dungeon crawling mechanic was also a means toward this end. Although Ishii has said the games in the series are only thematically connected, he has also asserted in an interview that Children is set ten years after the 2007 game Dawn of Mana, which depicts the events of the cataclysm.

=== Music ===
Seiken Densetsu DS: Children of Mana Original Soundtrack

Soundtrack album by Kenji Ito, Masaharu Iwata, Takayuki Aihara
- Released: May 9, 2006
- Genre: Video game soundtrack
- Length: 1:24:13
- Label: Square Enix

The score for Children of Mana was composed by Kenji Ito, Masaharu Iwata, and Takayuki Aihara. Ito had previously composed the music for the first game in the Mana series, Final Fantasy Adventure (1991), as well as its 2003 remake Sword of Mana, which was the most recent game in the series prior to Children. This was the first soundtrack in the Mana series to feature work by Iwata and Aihara, though Iwata had previously worked for Square Enix on many other titles. The music of the game covers a range of styles, including rock, jazz, and classical. Due to the limitations of the Nintendo DS hardware, Chris Greening of Square Enix Music Online said not all the synthesized instruments are "especially aesthetic or realistic". The album Seiken Densetsu DS: Children of Mana Original Soundtrack collects 33 tracks from Children of Mana on two discs and is nearly an hour and a half in length. It was published by Square Enix on May 9, 2006, on the Japanese iTunes Store, but has not been released as a stand-alone physical album.

== Reception ==
Reception

Aggregate score
Aggregator	Score
Metacritic	65/100 (34 reviews)

Review scores
Publication	Score
1Up.com	60 out of 100
Eurogamer	6 out of 10
Famitsu	36 out of 40
GamePro	4.0 out of 5
GameSpot	58 out of 100
GamesRadar+	3 out of 5
IGN	8.0 out of 10
RPGFan	75%

Children of Mana sold almost 103,000 units in its first three days in Japan—between March 2 and March 5—which was considered below expectations and partially blamed on product shortages of the Nintendo DS. According to Enterbrain, by the end of 2006 Children of Mana had sold just over 281,000 copies in Japan. It received mixed reviews from critics, with numerical scores from 58 to 90 out of a hundred. The game's presentation was praised, especially its graphics; Greg Mueller of GameSpot said "the saving grace of Children of Mana is the appealing visual style of the game." Raymond Padilla of GamesRadar praised the "beautiful and unique art style", and 1UP.com's Jeremy Parish said the graphics are "almost painfully cute". IGN's Mark Bozon and RPGFan's Neal Chandran compared the game to a painting and a storybook. The music was also praised; Bozon called it "pretty stunning", Chandran called it "quite good", and Mueller said it "fits the tone of the game very well".

Critics such as Mueller were generally more negative about the gameplay, finding it repetitive. He claimed there is "no break from the monotony of dungeon clearing", while Rob Fahey of Eurogamer said the game is repetitive and uninspiring. GamePro concluded that "the downfall of Children of Mana is its repetitiveness," and Chandran felt most players would be sick of the gameplay before finishing half of the game. The reviewers from the Japanese Shūkan Famitsū magazine, while giving the game an especially high score, noted that the gameplay could be considered insufficient compared to prior titles in the series. Bozon, while giving the game a more positive review than many others, felt the thinness of the gameplay was bolstered by the multiplayer component, saying that "the game's entertainment value goes up in leaps and bounds during multiplayer," a point with which Fahey agreed to a lesser extent.

In addition to the general dungeon-clearing gameplay, the combat itself was criticized by reviewers like Padilla, who said that "the weapon use is the most disappointing facet of this game." Both Fahey and Mueller felt the combat, while initially fun, quickly became boring due to the simplicity. Chandran added that magic spells were too slow to be useful in combat, further reducing the complexity of the gameplay. Chandran and GamePro both criticized the "sparse and slow" story, while Fahey dismissed it as "a gossamer-thin layer which tries and fails miserably to hold everything together" and nothing more than several role-playing game clichés stuck together. Padilla concluded that while the game had several good elements, it ultimately failed to live up to its potential as a Mana game.
