= Heroes of Mana =

2007 real-time strategy game for the Nintendo DS

- European cover art
- Developers: Square Enix; Brownie Brown
- Publisher: Square Enix
- Director: Takeo Oin
- Producer: Koichi Ishii
- Artist: Ryoma Ito
- Writer: Masato Kato
- Composer: Yoko Shimomura
- Series: Mana
- Platform: Nintendo DS
- Release: JP: March 8, 2007; NA: August 14, 2007; EU: September 14, 2007
- Genre: Real-time strategy
- Modes: Single-player, multiplayer

Heroes of Mana (Note: Known in Japan as Seiken Densetsu DS: Heroes of Mana (聖剣伝説(せいけんでんせつ)DS ヒーローズ·オブ·マナ, Seiken Densetsu Dī Esu: Hīrōzu obu Mana; lit. The Legend of the Sacred Sword DS: Heroes of Mana)) is a 2007 real-time strategy game developed by Brownie Brown and Square Enix and published by Square Enix for the Nintendo DS. It is the ninth game of the Mana series and the fourth entry in the World of Mana subseries, following the release of Dawn of Mana three months prior. Set in a high fantasy universe, Heroes of Mana follows a young soldier, Roget, as he journeys to defend several nations from the ruthless aggression of his own country in a series of battles.

While it contains some small role-playing elements, Heroes of Mana is a real-time strategy game, unlike the prior action role-playing game titles of the series. Composed of a series of strategic battles, the player gathers resources, constructs buildings and units, and fights enemy forces to achieve objectives on fixed isometric grid maps. The Nintendo DS's second screen displays a map of the ongoing battle, and buildings and units are constructed inside of the player's airship and dropped onto the map by the flying base. Players can fight several dozen required and optional battles in the single-player game, as well as local multiplayer matches.

Heroes of Mana was produced by series creator Koichi Ishii and directed by Takeo Oin; it is the final game in the series to involve Ishii. The story was written by Masato Kato, and the music was composed by Yoko Shimomura. The game was not a commercial success, selling around 180,000 copies worldwide by the end of 2007, less than contemporary Mana games. While critics generally praised the graphics, they were dismissive of the plot, mixed on the actual gameplay and sharply negative on what they saw as poor artificial intelligence and pathfinding inhibiting actual play.

== Gameplay ==
A battle in Heroes of Mana. The upper screen shows the game map, including fog of war, while the bottom screen shows a portion of the game field with several units with health bars attacking enemies.

Like previous games in the Mana series, Heroes of Mana features a top-down perspective, in which the player characters navigate the terrain and fight off hostile creatures and enemies. Unlike prior games in the series, which are typically action role-playing games, Heroes is a real-time strategy game (RTS), in which the player controls up to 25 units in battles on fixed maps. Units are controlled via the Nintendo DS touch screen, selected by tapping on them and sent to destinations or to attack by tapping on their target. The game world is divided into an isometric grid, with one unit allowed per space. The Nintendo DS's second screen shows a map of the current mission, including which parts of the map can currently be seen by the player's units and which parts are covered by fog of war. Individual units and enemies are shown on the map in the visible areas.

Some of the units available to the player are characters in the game's storyline, while the rest are monsters which can be summoned by the player. Resources, divided into berries and minerals, are gathered from resource nodes by Rabite units. Minerals are used to create buildings, while berries are used to create units from those buildings. Both buildings and units are built inside of the player's airship, and units are then dropped onto the battlefield by the movable ship. The game features some role-playing elements; characters during the course of the game learn new skills over time, and can be given equipment to increase their attack and defense. New equipment is obtained through completing story and bonus missions and finding hidden treasure. During the course of the game's story the player also acquires new summons and heroes. Missions can have different ending conditions, such as destroying an enemy carrier or defeating all enemies in the area. There are over 20 missions in the game's story, as well as dozens of bonus missions which become available as the player advances through the game which do not advance the plot but can give the player more items and summons.

Heroes of Mana features a local multiplayer option, where players can battle against each other using the progress they have made in the single-player game. There is no multiplayer support on the Nintendo Wi-Fi Connection service, though players can use it to access the Wi-Fi Heroes Ranking system to download additional maps, missions, and items.

== Plot ==
Heroes of Mana opens with a reconnaissance mission by a group of soldiers from Pedda into the beastman kingdom of Ferolia. The group, including the soldier Roget and his captain Yerchael, are on their airship, the Nightswan, when they are shot down by Ferolian ships. After crash-landing in a forest and getting separated, Roget and Yurchael fight their way back to the rest of the group through the Ferolian army before running into the Peddan military. The Peddans claim not to know about the group and attack them; after fleeing Roget and Yurchael discover that Pedda is invading Ferolia, and attacking peaceful villages as they do. Unable to support the invasion, the group rebels against Pedda and joins forces with the Ferolians.

They soon learn that the king of Pedda and Roget's childhood friend, Inath, has been driven mad and is launching Operation Psi with the aim of taking over the world. Roget and Yerchael journey to the other nations in order to help stop the Peddan army. They join forces with the rulers and warriors of several countries, including the defeated Amazons of Laurent, the rebels of Nevarla, which has allied itself with Pedda, and the warriors of Valsena and Altena. As they fight the Peddan army, they discover that Inath is installing Black Mirrors in the conquered kingdoms, which are corrupting those around them. Roget and Yurchael are joined in their quest by the elemental spirits, which are concerned about the mirrors. After confronting Roget's twin brother, the Mirage Bishop, they discover that Inath and the Mirage Bishop have been corrupted by the ancient witch Anise, who is planting the mirrors in order to summon a dark energy for her own power.

Roget and Yerchael join forces with Belgar, the Oracle of Shadows from the holy city of Wendel, who discovers that Anise is hoping to use the dark energy from the mirrors to turn herself into a goddess. Roget and his allies journey to the Mirage Castle to confront Anise, only for her to finish pulling the dark energy from the mirrors before they can stop her. The dark energy kills Inath and the Mirage Bishop, and Anise combines her form with a possessed Peddan general to create the Goddess of Doom. The allied forces fight and defeat the Goddess, ending the threat from Pedda, and return to their home countries.

== Development ==
In 2003, Square Enix began developing "polymorphic content", a marketing and sales strategy to "[provide] well-known properties on several platforms, allowing exposure of the products to as wide an audience as possible". The first of these was the Compilation of Final Fantasy VII, and Square Enix intended to have campaigns for other series whereby multiple games in different genres would be developed simultaneously. In early 2005, Square Enix announced a "World of Mana" project, the application of this "polymorphic content" idea to the Mana franchise, which would include several games across different genres and platforms. These games, as with the rest of the series, would not be direct sequels or prequels to one another, even if appearing so at first glance, but would instead share thematic connections. The fourth release in this project and the ninth release in the Mana series was announced in September 2006 as Heroes of Mana, the second Nintendo DS game in the World of Mana series and the first real-time strategy game in the series. It was first announced in Famitsu magazine and subsequently featured at the Tokyo Game Show.

Heroes of Mana was produced by series creator Koichi Ishii, directed by Takeo Oin, and written by Masato Kato. Ishii had previously produced or directed all of the previous Mana games, while Kato also wrote the stories for Children of Mana (2006) and Dawn of Mana (2006). The game was developed by Brownie Brown, who previously helped develop Sword of Mana (2003). Ishii created the overall design, and Brownie Brown worked directly with him to implement it. As the series creator, Ishii felt it was important to be directly involved in all stages of development. Heroes of Mana was created as an RTS game to complement the other titles in the World of Mana project, which all offer a spin on the original Seiken Densetsu formula. Ishii stated that it was also to help expose Japanese gamers to real-time strategy games, a genre that is relatively obscure in Japan, while simultaneously satisfying players abroad with an RTS for an unconventional console, as most real-time strategy games are released for personal computers. To match this mission, the game was designed for more casual players than the typical fan of the traditionally role-playing game series. The Nintendo DS was chosen as the platform partially due to the system's multiplayer potential as well as giving the sensation of touching the game. The team found developing an RTS for the Nintendo DS to be difficult, and had to start development over at one point. Although prior to the World of Mana project Ishii has said that the games in the series are only thematically connected, Heroes is explicitly set as a prequel to Trials of Mana (1995), depicting battles between the nations present in that game. It is set one generation prior to Trials of Mana, with some characters noted as the parents of characters in the other game.

=== Music ===
Seiken Densetsu: Heroes of Mana Original Soundtrack

Soundtrack album by Yoko Shimomura
- Released: April 18, 2007
- Genre: Video game soundtrack
- Length: 2:24:28
- Label: Square Enix

The score for Heroes of Mana was composed by Yoko Shimomura, who had previously composed the music for Legend of Mana in 1999. The musical style of the soundtrack is primarily orchestral, with the addition of a strong piano and drums that sometimes verge on a more tribal rhythm. The album Seiken Densetsu: Heroes of Mana Original Soundtrack collects 49 tracks from the game on 2 discs and is nearly two and a half hours long. It was published by Square Enix on April 18, 2007. Three of the game's tracks were released as part of Drammatica: The Very Best Works of Yoko Shimomura, a 2008 arranged album highlighting the composer's work: "To the Heroes of Old ~Opening Theme from Heroes of Mana~", "The Way the Heart Is" (as "Tango Appassionata"), and "The Tale Told by the Wind ~Ending Theme from Heroes of Mana~". Shimomura carefully chose the songs to be included on the album based on their apparent popularity among fans and how suitable they are for orchestra.

== Reception ==
Reception

Aggregate scores
Aggregator	Score
GameRankings	65% (33 reviews)
Metacritic	66/100 (32 reviews)

Review scores
Publication	Score
1Up.com	B
Eurogamer	5/10
Famitsu	32/40
Game Informer	5/10
GamePro	3.5/5
GameSpot	5.5/10
IGN	8/10
RPGFan	46/100

Heroes of Mana sold over 98,500 copies in Japan by the end of 2007. It sold 30,000 copies in North America and 50,000 in Europe as of November 2007, a few weeks after release in North America. Initial sales were lower than those for Children of Mana, the other Nintendo DS title in the series released one year earlier. Koichi Ishii attributed this to the overall lack of experience and popularity of the RTS genre in Japan.

Upon its release, Heroes of Mana received generally poor to middling reviews over a wide range, with numerical scores that range from 35 to 85 out of 100. Reviewers praised Heroes of Mana's graphics and visual style; IGN's Mark Bozon praised the "classic character art" and "hand-painted backdrops", GameSpot's Kevin VanOrd noted the colorful graphics and "overflowing" animations, and Eurogamer's Simon Parkin said that the "fantastic presentation and artwork" "sugar-coated" the game. Patrick Gann of RPGFan, on the other hand, said that besides the cinematics and character portraits the graphics were not impressive, with poor sprites and animation. The plot was not as highly received; while Bozon called it a "pretty involving piece of Mana mythos", VanOrd said only that it was not "particularly engaging, but it's pleasant enough", while Parkin called the story "lingering intrusions" and Gann found it well written, but too linear and clichéd. The reviewer for GamePro said that "the overall story doesn't grip players" and that there were too many characters to get attached to any of them. Gann called out the music as beautiful, though it was not mentioned by other reviewers.

The gameplay received very mixed reviews, with the artificial intelligence universally derided and other gameplay elements garnering a range of opinions. Bozon said that "the A.I. can be a real pain, as characters often take extremely odd routes to destinations or show command issues when engaging enemies", Joe Juba of Game Informer called the pathfinding "laughably terrible", a criticism echoed by Jeremy Parish of 1UP.com, and Parkin called it "an unmitigated disaster". VanOrd termed it "the worst, most broken system of unit pathfinding ever devised", and Gann felt it was so bad that it showed that the developers "had no idea what they were doing" in making an RTS. Bozon felt that the overall real-time strategy gameplay, however, was deep, if a bit slow, as did VanOrd. Parkin felt that the gameplay was "easy and intuitive", though slow, while Parish felt that the limitations of the Nintendo DS's small screens made the game too streamlined for an RTS game. Juba and the GamePro reviewer felt that the restrictions necessary to fit an RTS on a system the size of the DS made the game too simple and easy. The Japanese Famitsu review, however, felt that the game worked well as an RTS for the Nintendo DS, and was well-suited to the console. Both Bozon and Parish felt that the local multiplayer was better than the single-player game, though Bozon felt that the lack of online multiplayer was stifling and VanOrd felt that the tie between the multiplayer game and the player's single-player progress imbalanced any game where both players had not fully completed the storyline.
