= Adventures of Mana =

2016 video game

- Promotional artwork
- Developers: Square Enix; MCF
- Publisher: Square Enix
- Producer: Masaru Oyamada
- Composer: Kenji Ito
- Series: Mana
- Platforms: Android; iOS; PlayStation Vita
- Release: Android, iOS: WW: February 4, 2016; PlayStation Vita: JP: February 4, 2016; NA/EU: June 28, 2016
- Genre: Action role-playing
- Mode: Single-player

Adventures of Mana (Note: Known in Japan as Seiken Densetsu: Final Fantasy Gaiden (聖剣伝説 -ファイナルファンタジー外伝-, Seiken Densetsu: Fainaru Fantajī Gaiden; lit. 'The Legend of the Sacred Sword: A Final Fantasy Side Story')) is a 2016 action role-playing game developed by MCF and Square Enix, and published by Square Enix. It is a 3D remake of the 1991 Game Boy game Final Fantasy Adventure, the first game in the Mana series. It was released worldwide for Android and iOS on February 4, 2016; a PlayStation Vita version was also released on the same date in Japan, and in June 2016 in North America, South America and Europe.

The player takes the role of a young hero who, together with a heroine, tries to stop the Dark Lord of Glaive from destroying the Tree of Mana. The gameplay focuses on combat with monsters or other enemies, and is seen from a top-down perspective. The player traverses the game world, which is divided into several areas, and makes their way through dungeons. While fighting monster characters, a gauge is shown on the screen filling up over time and resetting when the player gets hit or attacks; by waiting to attack until the gauge is full, the player can use a stronger attack. The player is accompanied by various non-player characters, who each have different skills the player can use, and who help them defeat enemies.

The idea for the game came from the producer, Masaru Oyamada, who wanted all Mana games to be playable on modern platforms for the series' 25th anniversary in 2016. Initially there was some argument at Square Enix about whether the remake should be done in 2D or 3D; they chose 3D, as it was thought to be easier to control on smartphones and because it could be used as a base for potential future Mana remakes. The game has received positive reviews, with reviewers giving particular praise to the visuals and the music.

== Gameplay ==
The player character fights the very first enemy, Jackal, at the start of the game.

Adventures of Mana is an action role-playing game in which the player controls a young hero who, along with a heroine, tries to stop the Dark Lord of Glaive from destroying the Tree of Mana. The game is a 3D remake of the two-dimensional Game Boy game Final Fantasy Adventure, containing the same content. In the smartphone versions of the game, the player controls the hero by using a customizable virtual joystick and button set.

The game is seen from a top-down perspective, and focuses on sword combat. The player moves the hero through the game world, which is divided into several areas; as the player enters one, enemy characters start to appear there. Among the areas in the game world, there are dungeons that the player needs to get through. These usually consist of a number of rooms divided across three to four floors; in order to navigate their way through a dungeon, the player needs to break walls, unlock doors, and sometimes press down buttons and break pots.

In addition to the regular enemies, the player also needs to defeat several bosses and mini-bosses throughout the game. By defeating enemies, the player gains experience points, which make the hero's level increase; when this happens, the player gets points to spend on four different disciplines, each of which gives the hero access to different abilities and enhances different stats associated with the discipline: Warrior is associated with physical attacks, Monk with defense and health points, Mage with magic attacks and magic points, and Sage with an increase in the weapon limit gauge. Sometimes when enemies are defeated, they drop items; the player can carry items with them, which are grouped into stacks, each taking up one slot in the inventory.

During battles, a weapon limit gauge is shown, filling up over time; by waiting to attack until the gauge is filled up, the player can use a more powerful attack specific to the currently equipped weapon. The gauge resets to zero whenever the player attacks or gets hit by an attack. The player is able to use various different types of weapons, such as swords, axes and flails, each having a different attack pattern: sword attacks, for example, are mid-ranged swings and stabs, while flail attacks are long-ranged and reach out in a straight line from the hero. Most weapons can also be used to affect the environment: the player can cut down trees with axes, for instance. There are also variants of each weapon type with bonus strengths, such as flame variations, which are effective against ice monsters. At various points in the game, the hero is accompanied by non-player characters who help the player defeat enemies. These companions have different abilities that the player can use, such as Fuji's healing spell and Watt's shop.

== Development and release ==
Adventures of Mana is a remake of the 1991 Game Boy game Final Fantasy Adventure, which was the first entry in the Mana series. It is the second remake of Final Fantasy Adventure, the first being the Game Boy Advance game Sword of Mana, which had removed the connections to the Final Fantasy series in favor of being more connected to the rest of the Mana series. According to Adventures of Mana's producer, Masaru Oyamada, the development team focused on not upsetting what had made the original game good, while adding things that had not been possible to do in the original version due to hardware limitations; they also aimed to make the game more comfortable and intuitive to play: for instance, switching armor and weapons and using items and magic was made easier, and shortcut commands were added. The game borrows some elements from the original Game Boy version, and some from Sword of Mana. For example, the first remake introduced the ability to play as the heroine, but Adventures of Mana, like the original, only has a male playable character; conversely Adventures of Mana's battle system, user interface and sword attack are based on Sword of Mana's rather than the original's. Kenji Ito, the composer for Final Fantasy Adventure, returned to create updated and more dramatic rearrangements for the remake.

The idea to develop a remake came when Oyamada, due to the Mana series' 25th anniversary in 2016, thought about how he would like players to be able to play through the series in sequential order on modern game platforms. The platforms – Android, iOS and PlayStation Vita – were decided on from the beginning. Initially, there were some arguments at Square Enix about whether to create the game using 2D or 3D graphics; they settled on 3D, as Oyamada thought that 3D games are easier to control on smartphones. Additionally, the development team thought that a 3D version would be better, as it could be used as a base for potential remakes of other Mana games; depending on the reception of Adventures of Mana, Oyamada said that he would like to develop a remake of Trials of Mana, and would consider one of Secret of Mana depending on demand. The remake was developed by MCF.

When the game was announced in September 2015, development was 50% complete; by late December, development was 90% complete. The game was released worldwide for Android and iOS on February 4, 2016; in Japan, a PlayStation Vita version was also released on the same date. Responding to feedback, Square Enix's European branch said that the game's development team was examining the possibility of a Western release of the PlayStation Vita version; the PlayStation Vita version was later released in North America, South America and Europe on June 28, 2016. Square Enix also said in 2016 that they were considering versions of the game for PlayStation 4 and personal computers, though no such versions were ever released.

== Reception ==
Reception

Aggregate scores
Aggregator	Score	
Aggregator	iOS	PS Vita
GameRankings	83% (4 reviews)	
Metacritic		66/100 (18 reviews)

Review scores
Publication	Score	
Publication	iOS	PS Vita
Destructoid		5/10
Gamezebo	4.5/5	
Hardcore Gamer		2.5/5
Pocket Gamer	3.5/5	
RPGFan		80%
TouchArcade	4.5/5	

Adventures of Mana has been positively received by critics. Shaun Musgrave at TouchArcade felt that the sparse story set-up and lack of "supervision or training", while likely to "rub some people the wrong way", was refreshing; he liked the simplicity and "efficiency" of the game, and said that, as a remake, he was unsure if he could be any happier with it than he was. TouchArcade named Adventures of Mana as their "Game of the Week", calling it a "truly wonderful remake". Nadia Oxford at USgamer said that the game was "a very decent re-construction of Final Fantasy Adventure" and less tedious than Sword of Mana. Jason Schreier of Kotaku thought that the game was excellent; like Oxford, he preferred it over Sword of Mana, which he said felt more like a new game than like a remake. Harry Slater at Pocket Gamer, Musgrave, and Schreier all commented on the price, considering it to be high.

Oxford felt that the touch screen-based controls were not ideal for the fast pace of the gameplay. Schreier found the touch controls to be "just fine", but thought that the game would work better with a D-pad and buttons. He praised the presentation, saying that the music was "superb" and that the game looked great. Slater thought that the game's look was impressive and that the music was excellent. Musgrave called the music "outstanding", and found the monster characters to look fantastic, having benefited greatly from the updated 3D graphics; he was less sure about the art direction for the human characters, but still thought that they looked better than they did in Sword of Mana.
