= Mana (series) =

Video game series

- Genre: Action role-playing: Action-adventure, Real-time strategy, Card battle
- Developer: Square, Square Enix: Brownie Brown, Nex Entertainment, Goshow, MCF, M2, Xeen, WFS, Ouka Studios
- Publishers: Square, Square Enix
- Creator: Koichi Ishii
- Artists: Shinichi Kameoka, Nao Ikeda, Hirō Isono, HACCAN
- Composer: Kenji Ito, Hiroki Kikuta: Yoko Shimomura, Tsuyoshi Sekito, Masayoshi Soken, Ryuichi Sakamoto, Ryo Yamazaki
- Platforms: Game Boy, Super NES, PlayStation, Game Boy Advance, Nintendo DS, PlayStation 2, Android, iOS, PlayStation Vita, PlayStation 4, Windows, Nintendo Switch, PlayStation 5, Xbox Series X/S
- First release: Final Fantasy Adventure; June 28, 1991
- Latest release: Visions of Mana; August 29, 2024
- Parent series: Final Fantasy

The Mana series, known in Japan as Seiken Densetsu (聖剣伝説; lit. The Legend of the Sacred Sword), is an action role-playing game series created by Koichi Ishii, with development formerly from Square, and is currently owned by Square Enix. The series began in 1991 as Final Fantasy Adventure, a Game Boy handheld side story to Square's flagship franchise Final Fantasy. The Final Fantasy elements were subsequently dropped starting with the second installment, Secret of Mana, in order to become its own series. It has grown to include games of various genres within the fictional world of Mana, with recurring stories involving a world tree, its associated holy sword, and the fight against forces that would steal their power. Several character designs, creatures, and musical themes reappear frequently.

Four games were released in the series between 1991 and 1999: the original Seiken Densetsu (1991)—Final Fantasy Adventure in North America and Mystic Quest (no relation to Final Fantasy Mystic Quest) in Europe—for the Game Boy, Secret of Mana (1993) for the Super Nintendo Entertainment System, Trials of Mana (1995) for the Super Famicom, and Legend of Mana for the PlayStation. A remake of the original game, Sword of Mana (2003), was published for the Game Boy Advance. All of the original games were action role-playing games, though they included a wide variety of gameplay mechanics, and the stories of the games were connected only thematically.

In 2006 and 2007, four more games were released as part of the World of Mana subseries, an attempt by Square Enix to release games in a series over a variety of genres and consoles. These were Children of Mana (2006), an action-oriented dungeon crawler game for the Nintendo DS; Friends of Mana (2006), a Japan-only multiplayer role-playing game for mobile phones; Dawn of Mana (2006), a 3D action-adventure game for the PlayStation 2; and Heroes of Mana (2007), a real-time strategy game for the DS. Children was developed by Nex Entertainment and Heroes by Brownie Brown, founded by several developers of Legend, though Ishii oversaw development of all four games.

Three more games have been released since the World of Mana subseries ended: Circle of Mana (2013), a Japan-only card battle game for the GREE mobile platform, Rise of Mana (2014), a Japan-only free-to-play action role-playing game for iOS, Android, and PlayStation Vita, and Adventures of Mana (2016), a 3D remake of Final Fantasy Adventure for the PlayStation Vita, iOS, and Android. In 2024, a new mainline installment in the series, titled Visions of Mana, was released. In addition to the games, four manga series and one novelization have been released in the Mana franchise.

The Mana series reception has been very uneven, with early games rated significantly higher by critics than more recent titles. Secret of Mana has been regarded as one of the best 2D action role-playing games ever made, and its music has inspired several orchestral concerts, while the games from the World of Mana series have been rated considerably lower. By 2021, the series had sold over 8 million copies.

== Development ==
=== History ===
Release timeline
1991	Final Fantasy Adventure
1992
1993	Secret of Mana
1994
1995	Trials of Mana
1996
1997
1998
1999	Legend of Mana
2000
2001
2002
2003	Sword of Mana
2004
2005
2006	Children of Mana
2006	Final Fantasy Adventure (mobile remake)
2006	Friends of Mana
2006	Dawn of Mana
2007	Heroes of Mana
2008
2009
2010
2011
2012
2013	Circle of Mana
2014	Rise of Mana
2015
2016	Adventures of Mana
2017	Collection of Mana
2018	Secret of Mana (remake)
2019
2020	Trials of Mana (remake)
2021
2022	Echoes of Mana
2023
2024	Visions of Mana

Square trademarked Seiken Densetsu in 1989, intending to use it for a game project subtitled The Emergence of Excalibur, and led by Kazuhiko Aoki for the Famicom Disk System. According to early advertisements, the game would consist of an unprecedented five floppy disks, making it one of the largest titles developed for the Famicom up until that point. Although Square solicited pre-orders for the game, Kaoru Moriyama, a former Square employee, affirms that management canceled the ambitious project before it advanced beyond the early planning stages. In October 1987, customers who had placed orders were sent a letter informing them of the cancellation and had their purchases refunded. The letter also suggested to consider placing an order on another upcoming Square role-playing game in a similar vein: Final Fantasy.

In 1991, Square reused the Seiken Densetsu trademark for an unrelated Game Boy action role-playing game directed by Koichi Ishii. Originally developed under the title Gemma Knights, the game was renamed Seiken Densetsu: Final Fantasy Gaiden (published in North America as Final Fantasy Adventure and in Europe as Mystic Quest).

Beginning with the 1993 sequel, Secret of Mana, Seiken Densetsu was subsequently "spun off" into its own series of action role-playing games distinct from Final Fantasy, named the Mana series outside Japan. Four titles in the series were released between 1993 and 2003. Secret of Mana was originally intended to be a launch title for the Super NES CD-ROM Adapter, but when the add-on was cancelled it was cut down into a standard Super NES cartridge, with many of the cut ideas appearing in other Square titles. Hirō Isono provided artwork for the game including forest landscapes. It was followed in 1995 by the then Japan-only Trials of Mana (Seiken Densetsu 3 in Japan); the game was originally planned to be released in English as Secret of Mana 2, but technical issues and localization costs prohibited the release. The final new game in the series' initial run is the 1999 Legend of Mana, developed for the PlayStation. Legend is a 2D game like its predecessors, despite the PlayStation's 3D focus, because the console could not handle the full 3D world Ishii envisioned where one could interact with natural shaped objects. 2003 saw the release of Sword of Mana, a remake of the original Seiken Densetsu for the Game Boy Advance. The remake was outsourced to Brownie Brown, which was composed of many of the Square employees who had worked on Legend.

In 2003, Square, now Square Enix, began a drive to begin developing "polymorphic content", a marketing and sales strategy to "[provide] well-known properties on several platforms, allowing exposure of the products to as wide an audience as possible". The first of these was the Compilation of Final Fantasy VII, and Square Enix intended to have campaigns for other series whereby multiple games in different genres would be developed simultaneously. Although no such project for the Mana series had been announced by this point, it was announced in late 2004 that an unnamed Mana game was in development for the upcoming Nintendo DS platform. In early 2005, Square Enix announced a World of Mana project, the application of this "polymorphic content" idea to the Mana franchise, which would include several games across different genres and platforms. These games, as with the rest of the series, would not be direct sequels or prequels to one another, even if appearing so at first glance, but would instead share thematic connections. The first release in this project and the sixth release in the Mana series was announced in September 2005 as Children of Mana for the DS. Four games were released in 2006 and 2007 in the World of Mana subseries: Children of Mana, Friends of Mana, and Dawn of Mana in 2006, and Heroes of Mana in 2007.

Each game in the World of Mana series was different, both from each other and from the previous games in the series. Children is an action-oriented dungeon crawler game for the DS, developed by Nex Entertainment; Friends is a Japan-only multiplayer role-playing game for mobile phones; Dawn is a 3D action-adventure game for the PlayStation 2; and Heroes is a real-time strategy game for the DS, developed by Brownie Brown. While Ishii was the designer for all four games, he served as the director and producer for Dawn, which was considered the main game of the four and was released as Seiken Densetsu 4 in Japan. The theme of the subseries for Ishii, especially Dawn, was about exploring how to add "the feeling of touch" to a game. He had held off on designing new Mana games after Legend was unable to meet his desires, until he felt that technology had improved enough to let him create what he envisioned. A fifth game for the subseries was considered for the Wii in 2006, but did not enter development. In April 2007, a month after the release of the final game of the World of Mana, Ishii left Square Enix to lead his own development company, named Grezzo.

The Mana series was put on hiatus until 2013, when Square Enix released Circle of Mana, a Japan-only card battle game for the GREE mobile platform. It was followed in 2014 by Rise of Mana, a Japan-only free-to-play action role-playing game for iOS, Android, and PlayStation Vita, and in 2016 by Adventures of Mana, a 3D remake of Final Fantasy Adventure for the PlayStation Vita, iOS, and Android. On August 25, 2017, a 3D remake of Secret of Mana was announced for PlayStation 4, PlayStation Vita and Windows, for release on February 15, 2018. A 3D remake of Trials of Mana and localization of the original game (as part of the Collection of Mana) were announced via Nintendo Direct in 2019.

During the series' 30th anniversary stream, Square Enix announced a new mobile spin-off game, Echoes of Mana, as well as the new console game with involvement from the series creator Koichi Ishii. Titled Visions of Mana, it was formally announced at The Game Awards 2023, and is considered the first mainline installment since Dawn of Mana. The project was headed by producer Masaru Oyamada, while Ishii worked on the updated creature designs.

=== Creation and design ===
The Mana series is the result of Koichi Ishii's desire to create a fictional world. In Ishii's opinion, Mana is not a series of video games, but rather a world which is illustrated by and can be explored through video games. When working on the series, Koichi Ishii draws inspiration from abstract images from his memories of childhood, as well as movies and fantasy books that captivated him as a child. Ishii takes care to avoid set conventions, and his influences are correspondingly very wide and non-specific. Nonetheless, among his literary influences, he acknowledges Tove Jansson's Moomin, Lewis Carroll's Alice's Adventures in Wonderland, and J. R. R. Tolkien's Lord of the Rings.

While some titles of the World of Mana series do share direct connections with other installments, the games of the series have few concrete links. There is no overall explicit in-game chronological order. Further, according to Koichi Ishii in 2006 the games do not take place in exactly the same world, and characters or elements who appear in different titles are best considered alternate versions of each other. Instead, the connections between each title are more abstract than story-based, linked only on the karmic level. Complicating this assertion, Ishii has also said in an interview that Children is set ten years after Dawn, while Heroes is set one generation prior to Trials of Mana.

== Games ==
=== Main series ===
Title	Original release date		
Title	Japan	North America	PAL region
Final Fantasy Adventure	June 28, 1991	November 1991	1993
Notes: Released on Game Boy; Developed by Square; Also available on SoftBank Mobile (2006), i-mode (2006), EZweb (2007); Known in Japan as Seiken Densetsu: Final Fantasy Gaiden; Known in Europe as Mystic Quest; The first game of the Mana series was marketed in Japan and the United States as a Final Fantasy game and drew many stylistic influences from the Final Fantasy series, but deviated in that it presented real-time, action-oriented battles comparable to The Legend of Zelda, rather than traditional turn-based battles.
Secret of Mana	August 6, 1993	October 1993	November 24, 1994
Notes: Released on Super NES; Developed by Square; Also available on FOMA 903i/703i (2009), iOS (2010), Android (2014); Known in Japan as Seiken Densetsu 2; Originally planned for the SNES CD-ROM add-on in development by Nintendo and Sony, the game ended up being altered to fit on a standard cartridge when the add-on project was dropped by Nintendo. The game introduced the Ring Command menu system, which enabled prompt access to features such as items or magic spells. In 2003, the game ranked 78th in IGN's yearly "Top 100 Games of All Time".
Trials of Mana	September 30, 1995	June 11, 2019 (Switch)	June 11, 2019 (Switch)
Notes: Released on Super Famicom; Developed by Square; Known in Japan as Seiken Densetsu 3; Trials of Mana introduced a degree of non-linearity to the series, allowing players to choose at the beginning of the game a party of three members out of a total of six characters. Distinct encounters and endings can be seen depending on the characters selected. The original Super Famicom version was never released outside Japan due to technical bugs and it being too large for Western cartridges.
Dawn of Mana	December 21, 2006	May 22, 2007	none
Notes: Released on PlayStation 2; Developed by Square Enix; Known in Japan as Seiken Densetsu 4; Dawn of Mana is the first fully 3D game in the Mana series, utilizing the Havok physics engine seen in Half-Life 2 that allows a large amount of player interaction with their 3D environment. In the series in-universe timeline, Dawn of Mana is set at the very beginning, while Children of Mana takes place ten years later.
Visions of Mana	August 29, 2024	August 29, 2024	August 29, 2024
Notes: Released on PlayStation 4, PlayStation 5, Xbox Series X/S and Windows; Developed by Ouka Studios and Square Enix; Known in Japan as Seiken Densetsu: Visions of Mana; The fifth mainline installment in the series.

=== Spin-offs ===
Title	Original release date		
Title	Japan	North America	PAL region
Legend of Mana	July 15, 1999	June 6, 2000	June 24, 2021 (Remaster)
Notes: Released on PlayStation; Developed by Square; Also available on Nintendo Switch (2021), PlayStation 4 (2021), Windows (2021), Android (2021), iOS (2021), Xbox Series X/S (2024); Known in Japan as Seiken Densetsu: Legend of Mana; Legend of Mana features different gameplay from its predecessors. The locations of the game's world are represented on a map by artifacts placed by the player, with different artifact placements allowing him or her to obtain different items. The game features temporary sidekick characters that the player can recruit, breed or build, and a weapon and armor creation and tempering system. It also features a story with many diverging subplots. Critical reaction was mixed at the dramatic shift in gameplay and story structure from Secret of Mana.
Children of Mana	March 2, 2006	October 30, 2006	January 12, 2007
Notes: Released on Nintendo DS; Developed by Square Enix and Nex Entertainment; Known in Japan as Seiken Densetsu DS: Children of Mana; Children of Mana is an action role-playing game with randomly generated dungeons which was developed by Next Entertainment. Creator Koichi Ishii was most interested in the further development of multiplayer gaming that was first attempted in a limited way in Secret of Mana.
Friends of Mana	October 18, 2006	none	none
Notes: Released on Mobile; Developed by Square Enix; Known in Japan as Seiken Densetsu: Friends of Mana; Friends of Mana is a multiplayer role-playing game set in a fictional world called Mi'Diel. Friends of Mana forms part of the World of Mana series and was the first original Mana title on mobile devices. The servers for the game were shut down on February 28, 2011.
Heroes of Mana	March 8, 2007	August 14, 2007	September 14, 2007
Notes: Released on Nintendo DS; Developed by Square Enix and Brownie Brown; Known in Japan as Seiken Densetsu DS: Heroes of Mana; Heroes of Mana is a tactical role-playing game and a prequel to Trials of Mana. It was born out of the desire to make a real-time strategy game similar to Age of Empires, StarCraft, and Warcraft: Orcs & Humans.
Circle of Mana	March 5, 2013	none	none
Notes: Released on Android and iOS; Developed by Square Enix; Known in Japan as Seiken Densetsu: Circle of Mana; Circle of Mana was a card battle game released on the GREE platform on March 5, 2013. Players fight to defend the Tree of Mana using cards featuring characters from Secret of Mana, Trials of Mana, and Dawn of Mana. All worlds are connected through the Tree of Mana, and players must recover the Sword of Mana to restore the balance. Cards could be combined to make them evolve and players decided what skills the characters become proficient in, like Trials of Mana. Players can also battle each other for points in coliseum mode. The service was ended on September 30, 2015.
Rise of Mana	March 6, 2014	none	none
Notes: Released on iOS; Developed by Square Enix; Also available on Android (2014), PlayStation Vita (2015); Known in Japan as Seiken Densetsu: Rise of Mana; Rise of Mana returns the series to its Action-RPG roots, however this time as an 8-player co-op, free-to-play game with microtransactions. Set in the new land, Miste, the story revolves around the angelic Lasta and the demonic Darka engaged in an ages-long war for the mortal world. The soundtrack features contributions by composers from previous Mana games, (Tsuyoshi Sekito, Kenji Ito, Hiroki Kikuta, and Yoko Shimomura) and was released on April 23, 2014. The game service ended on March 31, 2016.
Echoes of Mana	April 27, 2022	none	none
Notes: Released on Android and iOS; Developed by Square Enix and Wright Flyer Studios; Echoes of Mana was a free-to-play 2D Action-RPG with microtransactions for mobile devices released on April 27, 2022. The game was a commercial failure and the service was ended on May 15, 2023.

=== Remakes ===
Title	Original release date		
Title	Japan	North America	PAL region
Sword of Mana	August 29, 2003	December 1, 2003	March 18, 2004
Notes: Released on Game Boy Advance; Developed by Square Enix and Brownie Brown; Known in Japan as Shin'yaku: Seiken Densetsu; Sword of Mana is a full remake of Final Fantasy Adventure developed by Brownie Brown. Features of the original game were reworked to be brought more in line with the direction the Mana series had taken with the later games.
Adventures of Mana	February 4, 2016	February 4, 2016	February 4, 2016
Notes: Released on Android, iOS and PlayStation Vita; Developed by Square Enix and MCF; Known in Japan as Seiken Densetsu: Final Fantasy Gaiden; Adventures of Mana is a 3D remake of Final Fantasy Adventure, the first game in the Mana series. The game's original composer Kenji Ito returned to work on the remake, composing new music and making the score even more "dramatic". It also features updated graphics and controls.
Secret of Mana	February 15, 2018	February 15, 2018	February 15, 2018
Notes: Released on PlayStation 4, PlayStation Vita and Windows; Developed by Square Enix and Q Studios; Known in Japan as Seiken Densetsu 2: Secret of Mana; Secret of Mana is a 3D remake of the title of the same name, the second game in the Mana series.
Trials of Mana	April 24, 2020	April 24, 2020	April 24, 2020
Notes: Released on Nintendo Switch, PlayStation 4, Windows, and Xbox Series X/S; Developed by Xeen and Square Enix; Also available on Android (2021), iOS (2021); Known in Japan as Seiken Densetsu 3: Trials of Mana; Trials of Mana is a 3D remake of the title of the same name, the third game in the Mana series.

=== Compilations ===
Title	Original release date		
Title	Japan	North America	PAL region
Collection of Mana	June 1, 2017	June 11, 2019	June 11, 2019
Notes: Released on Nintendo Switch; Developed by M2 and Square Enix; Known in Japan as Seiken Densetsu Collection; Collection of Mana is a compilation that contains the first three games of the Mana series, which are Final Fantasy Adventure, Secret of Mana and Trials of Mana, the latter being made available outside Japan for the first time.

== Common elements ==
The Mana series' Ring Command menu (from Trials of Mana)

A common element of the series is its seamless, real-time battle system. The system was developed by Koichi Ishii and improved upon by Hiromichi Tanaka, out of a desire to create a system different from the one featured in the first few Final Fantasy titles. While action-based, the Mana battle system is intended to be playable even by newcomers as well as veterans. The system is coupled with the distinctive hierarchical "Ring Command" menu system, featured prominently in Secret of Mana and Trials of Mana, and to a lesser extent in later installments. Each ring is a set of icons with a textual infobox explanation which, upon selection, allow the player to use an item, cast a spell, look up in-game statistics, or change the game's settings. Navigation within a menu is achieved by rotating the ring through the cursor left or right, while switching to a different menu is achieved by pressing the up or down buttons. Although not part of the series, the spin-off Secret of Evermore, developed by the North American Square Soft, was also built upon the "Ring Command" system.

The Mana series features several recurring characters and beings, including the Final Fantasy creatures Chocobos in Final Fantasy Adventure and Legend of Mana, and Moogles in Secret of Mana and as a status ailment in Trials of Mana and Sword of Mana. Watts is a dwarf blacksmith wearing a horned helmet who upgrades the player's weaponry. Usually, an anthropomorphic cat merchant is found outside of town areas and allows a player to save the game and buy supplies at high prices. Neko plays this role in Secret of Mana, and Niccolo in Legend of Mana and Sword of Mana. In the Japanese games these merchants share the name Nikita.

Artwork of the Mana Tree, from Children of Mana

The Mana Tree and the Mana Sword, called Excalibur in Final Fantasy Adventure's English version, are recurring plot devices that have been featured in every game of the series. The mystical Mana Tree is a source of magic that sustains the balance and nature of the series' world. The Mana Sword is typically used to restore this balance when it becomes lost in the games. Final Fantasy Adventure explains that if the Mana Tree dies, a member of the Mana Family will become the "seed" of a new Tree. A sprout of the Mana Tree is called a Gemma, while protectors of the Tree, who wield the Mana Sword, are called Gemma Knights. In Trials of Mana, a Goddess is said to have turned into the Mana Tree after creating the world with the Mana Sword. The Mana Tree is destroyed near the game ending in Final Fantasy Adventure and Secret of Mana, but a character becomes the new Mana Tree in the former game.

Elemental Spirits, also called Mana Spirits, are beings who govern the magic elements of the series' world, and are at the core of the games' magic system as they are used to cast magic spells. Eight types of spirits have appeared in the series since Secret of Mana, and each embodies a different element. Their names are homonyms of mythological beings or phenomena. In Secret of Mana and Trials of Mana, usage of their power is enabled upon the main characters' meeting with them. In Legend of Mana, the spirits serve as factors in the Land Creation System. In Legend of Mana and Sword of Mana, multiple spirits of the same elemental type appear. In terms of storyline, in Trials of Mana and Heroes of Mana, the spirits are charged to protect the Mana Stones in which the Mana Goddess sealed eight elemental benevodons (God-Beasts in the fan-translation of SD3). In Dawn of Mana's North American version, each spirit speaks with a particular European accent, such as French or Scottish.

A typical Rabite from Children of Mana

Rabites, known as Rabi (ラビ) in the Japanese versions of the games, are cute, fictional, rabbit-like creatures appearing as a common enemy in the series since its beginning. The Rabite has become a sort of mascot for the Mana series, much the same way as the Chocobo represents Final Fantasy, and is one of its most recognizable icons. The Rabite resembles a bodiless, one-toothed rabbit with large ears that curve upward and form a point at the tip, and a round, puffy pink tail that moves by hopping along the ground. It is most commonly yellow colored, but also pink, lilac, black, and white, and are variously minor enemies, "superboss" characters and even friendly units and pets. Rabites are also mentioned in Final Fantasy X-2 with an accessory comically named "Rabite's Foot", which increases a character's luck statistics. Additionally, they appear in Final Fantasy Tactics Advance in the description of one of the game's optional missions as an endangered species due to being poached for good luck charms. Rabites have appeared prevalently in several pieces of Mana merchandise, including plush dolls, cushions, lighters, mousepads, straps, telephone cards, and T-shirts.

Flammie, sometimes spelled Flammy, is the name of a fictional species of flying dragons, as well as the proper name of some its members, featured in several games of the series. A Flammie's appearance is a mixture of draconian, mammalian, and reptilian features, and its coloring has varied throughout the series. Flammies typically serve as a means of transportation in the game by allowing a player's characters to ride on a Flammie's back to different locations in the game's world. In Secret of Mana and Trials of Mana, the Super NES's Mode 7 graphic capabilities allows the player to control a Flammie from either a "behind the back" third-person or top-down perspective, and fly over the landscape as it scrolls beneath them. In terms of story, the Flammies were created by the Moon Gods, and are part of an endless cycle of destruction and rebirth as the stronger versions of Flammies—becoming part of a category of creature known as Mana Beasts (Benevodons in Trials of Mana), or God Beasts (神獣, Shinjū) in Japanese—destroy the world and the Mana Sword and Tree restore the world.

== Music ==
The Mana series has had several different composers. Final Fantasy Adventure was composed by Kenji Ito; it was his second original score. Ito's music is mainly inspired by images from the game rather than outside influences. The scores for Secret of Mana and Trials of Mana were both composed by Hiroki Kikuta. Despite difficulties in dealing with the hardware limitations, Kikuta tried to express, in the music of Secret of Mana, two "contrasting styles", namely himself and the game. This was to create an original score which would be neither pop music nor standard game music. Kikuta worked on the music for the two games mostly by himself, spending nearly 24 hours a day in his office, alternating between composing and editing to create an immersive three-dimensional sound. Kikuta considers the score for Secret of Mana his favorite creation. His compositions for Secret of Mana and Trials of Mana were partly inspired by natural landscapes. In 1995, Kikuta released an experimental album of arranged music from the two installments, titled Secret of Mana +, which features one 50-minute-long track.

Legend of Mana's score was composed by Yoko Shimomura, and of all her compositions, she considers it the one that best expresses herself. Kenji Ito returned to the series with Sword of Mana. He also composed roughly one third of the Children of Mana soundtrack, while the rest was composed by Masaharu Iwata and Takayuki Aihara. Ito was the main composer for Dawn of Mana, assisted by Tsuyoshi Sekito, Masayoshi Soken, and Junya Nakano, as well as main theme composer Ryuichi Sakamoto. In North America, purchasers of Dawn of Mana from participating retailers were offered a sampler disc, titled Breath of Mana, which features a selection of tracks from the game. Shimomura has returned to the series with Heroes of Mana, while also contributing one song to Rise of Mana.

== Printed adaptations ==
A five-volume manga based on Legend of Mana was drawn by Shiro Amano and published in Japan by Enterbrain between 2000 and 2002. It features a comedic story about the game's main character, here named Toto. A German version was published by Egmont Manga & Anime in 2003. A collection of four-panel comic strips, drawn by various authors and titled Sword of Mana Yonkoma Manga Theatre, was published in Japan by Square Enix on January 16, 2004. It included a questionnaire that, if sent back, allowed participants to win illustrations signed by Koichi Ishii and Shinichi Kameoka, as well as special T-shirts. Enterbrain also published a Sword of Mana manga adaptation in Japan on February 25, 2004, drawn by a collaboration of authors led by Shiro Amano. Two days later, Square Enix published a two-volume novelization of Sword of Mana in Japan written by Matsui Oohama. An original manga, named Seiken Densetsu: Princess of Mana, taking place 300 years after Children of Mana and starring the descendant of Ferrick, was drawn by Satsuki Yoshino and published in the Japanese magazine Gangan Powered from July 22, 2006, to May 27, 2010 and collected into five volumes.

== Reception ==
Aggregate review scores
Game	Metacritic
Final Fantasy Adventure	(GB) 79% (Note: GameRankings score)
Secret of Mana	(SNES) 87% (iOS) 80/100 (PS4) 63/100 (PC) 57/100 (Vita) 51%
Trials of Mana	(NS) 74/100 (PC) 78/100 (PS4) 76/100
Legend of Mana	(PS) 73%
Sword of Mana	(GBA) 72/100
Children of Mana	(NDS) 65/100
Dawn of Mana	(PS2) 57/100
Heroes of Mana	(NDS) 66/100
Adventures of Mana	(Vita) 66/100
Visions of Mana	(PS5) 75/100 (PC) 75/100

The Mana series has been mostly well received, though each title has seen varied levels of success. RPGFan called Final Fantasy Adventure one of the best things to happen to the Game Boy, while IGN considered it the best action RPG on the console after The Legend of Zelda: Link's Awakening. GameSpot referred to Secret of Mana as "one of Square's masterpieces on the SNES". The game has appeared on several list of top games, including ranked number 97 on Famitsu's top 100 games of all time. Trials of Mana was called "easily one of the best RPGs to come out of the 16-bit era" by Nintendo Life. Famitsu rated Legend of Mana at 31/40 and Heroes of Mana at 32/40. The NPD Group ranked Legend of Mana as the top seller the week of its release, and in 2006 was re-released as part of the Ultimate Hits series.

Many of the World of Mana titles have not been as critically successful as the original five games in the series, and though the franchise has been praised for their attempts at trying new ways of experiencing the games' fictional world, there have been various gameplay design flaws that have hindered the later games. 1UP.com commented that despite the game's excellent presentation and storytelling, Dawn of Mana did not match the level of gameplay of the early Mana games. Prior to the World of Mana games, RPGamer called the series a "treasured favorite". After the release of Heroes of Mana, they commented that the World of Mana series is "cursed", and the future of the series looked "bleak".

The music of the Mana series, especially Secret of Mana, has received wide acclaim and fan enthusiasm. The Secret of Mana soundtrack was one of the first official soundtracks of video games music released in the United States and thus before fully mainstream interest in RPGs. The Secret of Mana's opening theme, "Angel's Fear", was rated at number 7 on IGN's Top Ten RPG Title tracks, calling it a "magical title song that captures our hearts". It was also featured in the third Orchestral Game Concert. Secret of Mana is also the number 6 most remixed soundtrack on the popular video game music site OverClocked ReMix, with Trials of Mana tied at 18. The music of the other titles have also been well received. RPGFan called the music to Final Fantasy Adventure "addictive", despite its low, MIDI-like quality. GameSpy called Children of Mana's music some of the best Nintendo DS music yet and referred to it as "beautiful". Game Informer complimented Dawn of Mana's music, calling it good. IGN referred to Legend of Mana's music as "beautiful" and stated the background music brought "intensity", "suspense", and "subtle nuance" to the game. Other reviewers echoed similar praise to GameSpot, calling the music "excellently orchestrated" and RPGFan calling it one of the game's good points.

The Mana series has sold well overall, and as of March 2011, series titles have sold over 6 million units. The original Seiken Densetsu sold over 700,000 units, and its remake Sword of Mana sold over 277,000 copies in Japan. Secret of Mana has shipped over 1.83 million copies worldwide. Legend of Mana sold over 400,000 units in its first week alone as the highest-selling release that week in Japan, and over 700,000 copies in Japan by the end of the year. Children of Mana sold over 281,000 copies in Japan, and Dawn of Mana sold over 410,000 copies worldwide. Heroes of Mana sold over 178,000 copies worldwide. The PlayStation Vita version of Rise of Mana downloaded over 100,000 times. By 2021, the game series had sold over 8 million copies.

== See also ==
- List of Square Enix video game franchises
