= Echoes of Mana =

2022 video game

- Developer: Wright Flyer Studios
- Publisher: Square Enix
- Director: Yusuke Murata
- Producer: Akira Haruta
- Artist: Haccan
- Composers: Tsuyoshi Sekito; Ryo Yamazaki
- Series: Mana
- Platforms: Android iOS
- Release: April 27, 2022
- Genre: Action role-playing
- Modes: Single-player, multiplayer

Echoes of Mana (Note: Japanese: 聖剣伝説 エコーズオブマナ, Hepburn: Seiken Densetsu: Ekōzu obu Mana; lit. The Legend of the Sacred Sword: Echoes of Mana) was a 2022 action role-playing video game developed by Wright Flyer Studios and published by Square Enix for Android and iOS devices as a spin-off within the Mana series. Following the adventures of a warrior chosen by the Mana Tree to travel multiple worlds in pursuit of a great evil, the gameplay featured the protagonist exploring different worlds based on earlier Mana entries. The game was free-to-play, incorporating a gacha-based system for characters and upgrades.

In development for three years, the game was intended as having both combat challenge and be easy to pick up. The characters were illustrated by Haccan, and the music co-composed by Tsuyoshi Sekito and Ryo Yamazaki. Echoes of Mana was announced in 2021 as part of the Mana series' 30th Anniversary celebrations. It launched worldwide on April 27, 2022, and was operational until May 15, 2023. During 2022, it achieved four million downloads worldwide. Reception from journalists was mixed, with praise going to its art design and music while the story and gacha-based gameplay were criticized. The game was also considered a commercial failure.

== Gameplay ==
The protagonists (left) battle enemies in a forest. Player statistics are in the top left corner and battle command buttons are in the right corners.

Echoes of Mana was an action role-playing video game in which players took on the role of a warrior, either the male Quilto or female Quilta, and went on a mission which took them across multiple worlds based on entries across the Mana series. The game could be played either in single-player, or cooperative multiplayer with up to three people. Players could automatically progress through zones, or use manual controls and explore optional areas which contained additional rewards.

The real-time action combat involved engaging enemies found in the environment; the player's party had three active members and three in reserve that could be switched out, with only one character controllable by the player. The party members are equipped with different weapons, and have special skills charged using normal attacks. These skills drained the player's magic meter. Characters also had elemental affinities which influenced their strengths and weaknesses.

The party was made up of both original characters, and characters drawn from other Mana games. New characters and equipment were given to the player as they progressed, or they could be unlocked using microtransactions in a gacha-based system. Characters had a rarity rating dictating how likely they were to be rewarded, and used different currencies and stanima meters for training activities to raise their experience level. Characters and equipment could be boosted using loot found during exploration, or using items bought from the in-game shop.

== Plot ==
The chosen protagonist, either Quilto or Quilta, is given a mission by the Mana Goddess to restore the Mana multiverse, which has been destroyed, being given the Mana Sword for this purpose. They are aided and guided by the familiar Baashear, and the other possible protagonist. It is eventually revealed the player character was being manipulated by Dema, an imposter who was gathering power from the multiverse and created a false Mana Tree. The real Mana Goddess was once Nona, a human priestess chosen as the Mana Tree's personification; Baashear was a stuffed toy of hers given life. Dema was Nona's twin sister, passed over for the role, and was manipulated by the witch Anise into attempting to become the Goddess. Dema's actions disrupt the Goddess's power, allowing her to shape the universe. Dema fools the player's alternate-gender counterpart into becoming a rival. However, the player manages to destroy the roots of Dema's false Mana Tree and convince their rival to stand down. They combine their power to defeat Dema and remove her corruption, allowing her and Nona to reconcile. Quilto and Quilta are returned with Baashear to their world, described as a product of the echoes of other worlds.

== Development and release ==
Echoes of Mana was developed by Wright Flyer Studios, known for multiple mobile titles including Another Eden. The game was produced by Akira Haruta and directed by Yusuke Murata. Production of the game lasted three years, with Haruta commenting that communication during production was impacted by the COVID-19 pandemic, although production overall was unaffected. In a critical feature for Bloomberg News about Square Enix's uneven commercial performance and short-lived mobile projects, Takashi Mochizuki and Kotaro Hara cited anonymous employee interviews citing an attitude of product "fiefdom" causing issues with long-term production.

The game was intended to be both easy for players to get into, and to present similar gameplay challenges to the main series. Haruta described the story as an "all-star" creation drawing inspiration from the whole franchise. The gameplay was directly inspired by the 2D titles Secret of Mana, Trials of Mana, and Legend of Mana. Animating the in-game character models so they were expressive within the 2D artstyle and hardware limitations was challenging, with the team using third-party software to help make up for the lack of 2D animators on their team. The game's character art was created by Haccan, while the music was co-composed by Tsuyoshi Sekito and Ryo Yamazaki. The composers worked on the game in parallel to Visions of Mana (2024). Yamazaki described his work as mostly focusing on acoustic elements.

Echoes of Mana was announced in June 2021 during a livestream forming part of the Mana series' 30th Anniversary celebrations. Pre-registration opened in March 2022, with in-game rewards unlocking based on the number of registrations. The game launched worldwide on April 27, 2022 for Android and iOS mobile devices. An animated release trailer was created by Madhouse, Inc. The opening was directed and storyboarded by Morio Asaka, and featured a vocal theme performed by Remi. The game was shut down on May 15, 2023, with services related to its gems and shop gradually withdrawn in the months prior. Square Enix explained the shutdown as being unable to maintain the desired content quality. A commemorative artbook was released on May 31, which included artwork and story summaries.

== Reception ==
Prior to release, Echoes of Mana reached one million pre-registrations. By September 2022, it had reached four million downloads worldwide. Speaking after the game's shutdown, Mochizuki and Hara posited that saturation of competing mobile projects from Square Enix had contributed to its failure to endure.

In a preview of the game, Neal Ronaghan of Nintendo World Report skipped over the mobile-specific mechanics as non-intrusive and expected, while praising the combat as a simplified version of the traditional Mana battle system. In another preview, Jenni Lada of Siliconera's Jenni Lada noted similarities to earlier Mana titles in its characters and aesthetic elements. After playing the game shortly before its release, Automaton Media praised the graphical design, gameplay and narrative, but found the controls difficult and noted a lack of meaningful progression.

Reviewing the game at release, Scott Clay of RPGFan praised the visuals and sound design, and enjoyed the narrative. Conversely, he heavily criticized the gacha model as unforgiving and highlighted a lack of moderation in the multiplayer mode. John Friscia of The Escapist similarly praised the visuals and music, but summed up the story as "a parade of cute but vapid interactions" and negatively described the gameplay as typical for mobile titles and only interesting to existing fans.
