= Dawn of Mana =

2006 video game

- North American box art
- Developer: Square Enix
- Publisher: Square Enix
- Director: Koichi Ishii
- Producer: Koichi Ishii
- Artists: Nao Ikeda; Airi Yoshioka; Hiroo Isono
- Writers: Ryo Akagi; Masato Kato
- Composers: Kenji Ito; Tsuyoshi Sekito; Masayoshi Soken; Ryuichi Sakamoto
- Series: Mana
- Platform: PlayStation 2
- Release: JP: December 21, 2006; NA: May 22, 2007
- Genre: Action-adventure
- Mode: Single-player

Dawn of Mana (Note: Japanese: 聖剣伝説4, Hepburn: Seiken Densetsu 4; lit. The Legend of the Sacred Sword 4) is a 2006 action-adventure game for the PlayStation 2. It was developed and published by Square Enix. It is the eighth game of the Mana series and the third entry in the World of Mana subseries, following the release of Children of Mana nine months prior and Friends of Mana two months prior. Set in a high fantasy universe, Dawn of Mana follows a young hero, Keldric, as he journeys to close a portal to a land of darkness that has been opened in the base of the Tree of Mana and is corrupting the world.

While it contains some small role-playing elements, Dawn of Mana diverges from the prior two-dimensional action role-playing game titles of the series to focus directly on action-adventure gameplay in a full 3D world. Incorporating the Havok physics engine, the gameplay focuses on the player grabbing and throwing objects and monsters in order to startle enemies before attacking them with a sword and magic. Keldric grows more powerful as the player journeys through an area, only to reset to his base abilities with each new zone unless difficult extra challenges are met. Unlike many of its predecessors, the game does not feature any cooperative multiplayer component.

Dawn of Mana was designed, directed, and produced by series creator Koichi Ishii. The script was written by Ryo Akagi, based on a story created by Masato Kato, and the music was composed by a group led by Kenji Ito. It is the final game in the series to be developed in-house by Square Enix. The game was a moderate commercial success: it sold 229,000 copies in its first ten days of release in Japan, and over 410,000 copies worldwide by the end of 2008. While critics praised the graphics and music as beautiful and lush, they found the leveling system annoying, the combat controls difficult and frustrating, and the story trite.

== Gameplay ==
Keldric using the whip to throw one enemy at another. The lower left corner show his level, health, and items, the lower right shows Faye's level and mana, as well as the equipped spell and number of pebbles, while the upper right shows the map.

Unlike previous games in the Mana series, Dawn of Mana takes place in a full three-dimensional world, in which the player characters navigate the terrain and fight off hostile creatures. The player controls the main character, Keldric, and is followed for almost all of the game by a fairy spirit, Faye. Unlike previous games in the series, Dawn is an action-adventure game, rather than an action role-playing game; as such, gameplay is focused on movement and attacking enemies, rather than leveling-up character statistics. Keldric is able to run, roll, and jump through the game world. Keldric has access to a vine-like plant attached to his arm, which can be used at any time as either a sword, a whip, or a slingshot. The sword can be used to hit enemies and objects, the whip can grab and throw enemies and objects, and the slingshot can throw collectible pebbles as projectiles. Faye can cast magic spells, selectable by the player.

The combat system in Dawn of Mana is called the Mono system, based around the Havok physic engine. Almost all objects in the game, including enemies, are moveable, allowing Keldric to throw objects at enemies, or even throw other monsters. Keldric can either throw objects in the direction he is facing, or can target a specific enemy or object to aim at them. When something is thrown near an enemy, they Panic, resulting in a counter over their head that counts down to zero to end the Panic. While panicked, enemies take more damage from attacks and spells. Defeating enemies when they are panicked gives the player two types of medals, which can either boost the player's health and attack damage, or mana and magic damage. Throwing multiple objects can Panic enemies more; when the Panic meter is greater than 99 the player can receive better medals. Defeating enemies also grants experience points, which raise Keldric and Faye's level up to a maximum of four, granting higher health, mana, and damage, and granting new spells and attacks. In addition to being throwable, many objects in the game are also destructible.

The game is divided into eight chapters and a prologue; at the end of each chapter, the player is graded on their performance, and all of their statistics and medals are reset. The only items which carry over between chapters are emblems, which are given to the player for achieving high scores in a chapter or defeating hidden monsters. High scores are achieved by defeating more enemies, and defeating enemies with high Panic meters. In addition to the main game is a challenge arena, accessible through the main menu, where Keldric can fight timed battles against powerful foes. Keldric can fight alongside AI-controlled pets in these challenges, found in eggs throughout the game. The challenge arena also contains a shop, which contains emblems, eggs, and bonuses like extra music or higher game difficulties, which can be bought with money dropped by enemies throughout the game.

== Plot ==
Dawn of Mana opens on the fictional island of Illusia, a place where the giant Mana Tree lies dormant. Much of the story takes place on Fa'Diel, a continent composed of the five nations of Jadd, Topple, Ishe, Wendell, and Lorimar. At the start of the game Ritzia, a Maiden in charge of tending to the Tree, and Keldric, her knight and the player-controlled character, have left their village to find Ritzia's missing pet. While they are out, Illusia is attacked by King Stroud of Lorimar. The pair rush to the Tree of Mana, thinking that Stroud intends to attack the legendary beast that lies sleeping underneath its roots. While searching for the beast, Keldric finds a seed of the Tree, which attaches to his arm and can transform into a slingshot, a whip, or a sword. They also find Faye, a spirit child, who can cast magic and joins them. When they reach the center of the labyrinth of roots, Stroud's men catch up to them; they had been searching for Ritzia, not the beast. Stroud intends to open a portal to Mavolia, a land of darkness sealed away for centuries, and believes Ritzia is part of the key as a Maiden had been a part of opening the portal before. Stroud leaves with Ritzia to find the rest of the key, and Keldric and Faye chase after them.

Keldric and Faye, with the help of the great beast, Flammie, force the Lorimarian army to leave the village. They chase after Stroud, catching up to him at the coast. There they free Ritzia, only to be attacked by Stroud, wielding the other part of the key—the Sword of Mana. Keldric is thrown off of Stroud's airship, and the Lorimarians invade Illusia again. Stroud opens the portal, and a wave of dark energy is released, transforming the Tree, turning the people of Illusia into monsters called Grimlies, and releasing dark monsters from Mavolia. Keldric and Faye flee, and head for Fa'Diel.

A year of wandering later, the dark energy has begun to affect other countries in Fa'Diel. Keldric discovers in Jadd that Ritzia plans to release the Mavolian energy to cover the whole world. He and Faye journey back to Illusia, only to discover Ritzia seemingly possessed and saying that it is their destiny to rule the world. After she runs away, Keldric meets a masked stranger who tells him that he was the one to close the portal centuries ago, sealing up the Maiden who had opened it, Anise, inside. He also reveals that Stroud is Keldric's older brother. When Keldric and Faye reach the portal, they find Stroud and Ritzia fighting. Stroud is trying to prevent Ritzia, possessed by Anise, from destroying the world, but is being mutated by the dark energy. Keldric defeats the mutated Stroud, and then fights Ritzia. Realizing that the only way to close the portal is to defeat Anise, he is forced to kill Ritzia along with her. The spirits of Ritzia and Faye then merge with the Tree of Mana, the portal is sealed, and Illusia is restored.

== Development ==
In 2003, Square Enix began a drive to begin developing "polymorphic content", a marketing and sales strategy to "[provide] well-known properties on several platforms, allowing exposure of the products to as wide an audience as possible". The first of these was the Compilation of Final Fantasy VII, and Square Enix intended to have campaigns for other series whereby multiple games in different genres would be developed simultaneously. In early 2005, Square Enix announced a "World of Mana" project, the application of this "polymorphic content" idea to the Mana franchise, which would include several games across different genres and platforms. These games, as with the rest of the series, would not be direct sequels or prequels to one another, even if appearing so at first glance, but would instead share thematic connections. The third release in this project and the eighth release in the Mana series was announced in September 2005 as Seiken Densetsu 4, the first 3D game in the series, though no other details were given in favor of promoting the first game, Children of Mana.

Dawn of Mana was designed, directed, and produced by series creator Koichi Ishii. The script was written by Ryo Akagi, based on a story created by Masato Kato. The main objective of the development team was to convert the entire Mana world into a 3D environment, rather than just starting from scratch graphically and adding new elements to the gameplay. Ishii had previously wanted to make the 1999 PlayStation game Legend of Mana a 3D game, but the console had been unable to handle his vision of the player interacting with natural shaped objects in a full 3D world. He wanted to create a Mana title that could explore "the feeling of touch" in a game. After seeing the Havok physics engine in a demo of Half-Life 2 at E3 in 2004, Ishii decided to use the system in Dawn to give players a visual link between environments, objects, and characters. He hoped the physics engine and 3D graphics would allow him "to create a world where players utilize a variety of actions to alter the world and the objects contained within". Although Ishii has said that the games in the series are only thematically connected, he has also asserted in an interview that Dawn is set ten years before Children of Mana, which depicts the aftermath of the "cataclysm" of Dawn.

=== Music ===
Seiken Densetsu 4 Original Soundtrack -Sanctuary-

Soundtrack album by Kenji Ito, Tsuyoshi Sekito, Masayoshi Soken, Ryuichi Sakamoto
- Released: January 24, 2007
- Genre: Video game soundtrack
- Length: 4:19:41
- Label: Square Enix

The score for Dawn of Mana was composed by Kenji Ito, while Tsuyoshi Sekito and Masayoshi Soken contributed numerous tracks and Grammy Award-winning musician and film composer Ryuichi Sakamoto wrote the theme song, "Dawn of Mana". Tracks originally composed for earlier games in the series by Ito, Hiroki Kikuta, and Yoko Shimomura were also arranged for Dawn of Mana by the main three composers in addition to Junya Nakano and Hirosato Noda. Sekito focused on the game's boss themes, while Soken worked on other battle music. Ito had previously composed the music for the first game in the Mana series, Final Fantasy Adventure (1991), as well as its 2003 remake Sword of Mana, and for the 2006 Children of Mana. This was the first soundtrack in the Mana series to feature work by Sekito, Soken, or Sakamoto, though Sekito and Soken had worked for Square Enix previously on other titles. The music of the game covers a range of styles, including rock, classical, and orchestral. Sakamoto drew inspiration for the theme song from the image of the Mana tree shown at the title screen of the game. The album Seiken Densetsu 4 Original Soundtrack -Sanctuary- collects 106 tracks from Children of Mana on four discs and is nearly four and a half hours in length. It was published by Square Enix on January 24, 2007. A promotional album, Breath of Mana, was released along with preorders of the game in Japan on December 21, 2006. The thirteen-minute disc contains five orchestral and piano songs, all composed by Ito, three of which did not appear on the full soundtrack album.

== Reception ==
Reception

Aggregate scores
Aggregator	Score
GameRankings	57% (30 reviews)
Metacritic	57/100 (27 reviews)

Review scores
Publication	Score
1Up.com	C−
Famitsu	30/40
Game Informer	7/10
GameSpot	5.1/10
GameSpy	2/5
GameTrailers	5.5/10
IGN	6.5/10
RPGamer	2.0/5

Dawn of Mana sold over 229,000 copies in Japan by the end of 2006, ten days after release, and was the top-selling PlayStation 2 title in Japan during its release week. As of November 2008 it had sold over 340,000 copies in Japan. The game sold 70,000 copies in North America by November 2007.

Upon its release, Dawn of Mana received generally poor reviews over a wide range, with numerical scores that range from 30 to 80 out of 100. Reviewers praised Dawn of Mana's graphics and character design; GameSpot's Kevin VanOrd called it colorful and "pretty", and praised the particle effects, while a reviewer for GameTrailers noted the "gorgeous in-game cinematics". Gabe Graziani of GameSpy also called out the cinematics in his review, calling them "beautifully rendered and animated" and the highlight of the game. IGN's Jeff Haynes liked the scale and variety of the 3D environments and called out the character models as worthy of praise. Andrew Fitch of 1UP.com, however, described the level design as "chaotic" despite the "charming, candy-coated graphics". Joe Juba and Matt Miller of Game Informer said that the environments are "pretty bland", but praised the rest of the graphics heavily. Michael Beckett of RPGamer said that "Dawn of Mana's visual style is highly impressive" and especially praised the character design and color palette. The music was also praised; VanOrd called it "the highlight of the sound design" and the GameTrailers reviewer claimed that Dawn of Mana had a "lush soundtrack filling every moment of the game". Beckett also praised the music, and noted the callbacks in the largely orchestral score to previous games in the Mana series.

The gameplay was heavily criticized by reviewers such as Fitch of 1UP.com, who disliked both the way the character abilities reset with every new area and the "inane" and "mundane" system for collecting emblems, criticisms echoed by GameSpot's VanOrd. The GameTrailers review added that the way the character's levels and abilities reset in each area "zaps the sense of accomplishment from the game as a whole". Haynes of IGN also found issues with the targeting system for attacking enemies at range, finding it ineffective, and also criticized the leveling system and the game's map. Graziani of GameSpy felt the targeting system was one of the worst parts of Dawn of Mana, along with the camera system—a complaint also raised by Haynes. Both Fitch and VanOrd focused their criticisms of the controls on the Havok physics engine, which they felt was poorly utilized and left the player feeling out of control—unable to aim when throwing objects or easily control the character during the game's jumping sections. Juba of Game Informer felt that the physics engine left the controls "laughably uncooperative".

The game's story was also not seen as a highlight; Graziani called it "trite" and "fan service", while Fitch deemed it "a bit of a Neverending Story rip-off", though a charming one. Beckett of RPGamer called it "a somewhat trite tale of boy chases girl" and noted "a general lack of closure to the story". Juba of Game Informer, however, deemed it an "interesting plot". Both the GameTrailers review and VanOrd praised the "charm" of the characters, though VanOrd noted that they were making up for an unoriginal plot. Overall, several reviewers felt that Dawn of Mana was a divergence from the rest of the series that did not add as much as it took away; even the notably high-scoring Japanese Famitsu review felt that the change in gameplay would confuse fans and other players.
