= Koichi Ishii =

Japanese video game designer (born 1964)

- 石井 浩一
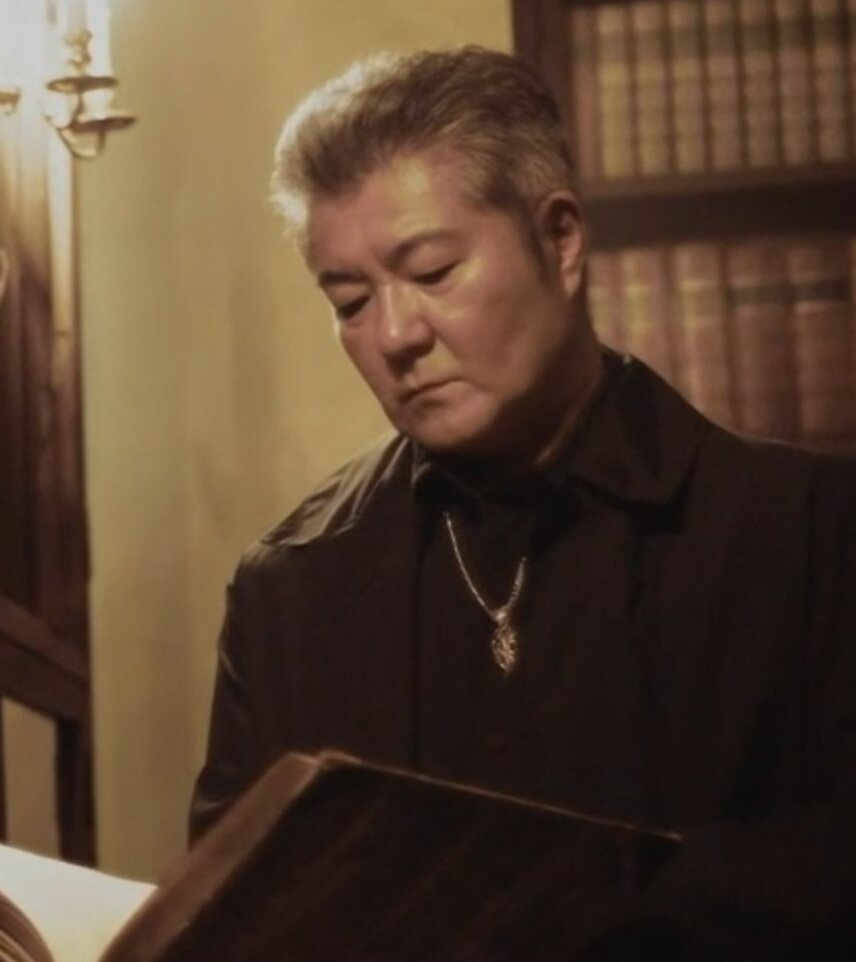
- Ishii in 2024
- Born: July 9, 1964 (age 61); Tokyo, Japan
- Occupations: Video game designer, director, producer, character designer
- Years active: 1986–present
- Employers: Square (1986–2003); Square Enix (2003–2007); Grezzo (2007–present)
- Known for: Mana series Final Fantasy series
- Children: 2

Koichi Ishii (石井 浩一, Ishii Kōichi; born July 9, 1964) is a Japanese video game designer best known for creating the Mana series and founding Grezzo. He joined Square in 1986, where he has directed or produced every game released in the Mana series (up to 2007). He has also contributed to several games in Square Enix's Final Fantasy and SaGa series, and created the well-known chocobo and moogle characters.

== Biography ==
=== Square/Square Enix ===
Koichi Ishii worked on the first three Final Fantasy games, as well as SaGa Frontier. He was invited to work on the original Final Fantasy in 1986, and helped develop the crystal theme that became a recurring motif of the series. Ishii became the head of Square Enix's Product Development Division 8.

=== Mana series ===
He wanted to create a game called Seiken Densetsu in 1987, but Square rejected the idea before he even finished planning it. He was able to develop it in the early 1990s as a Final Fantasy Gaiden. He was involved in the development of the Sword of Mana and all other World of Mana games.

The World of Mana series was conceived to be a way for players to experience the Mana series in many formats and gameplay styles.

On Heroes of Mana, development of a real-time strategy game became so difficult they had to start development all over at one point. Another challenge of game development was due to the Japanese gaming audiences lack of familiarity with an RTS style of gaming. The world of Seiken Densetsu 3 was chosen due to its plot involving warring states, which was thought to be well suited for an RTS game.

He left Square Enix after the release of the World of Mana series. During the series' 30th anniversary livestream it was announced that a new entry in the franchise was in the early stages of development and that Ishii was involved with the project. The game titled Visions of Mana was released in August 2024.

=== Final Fantasy XI ===
Ishii was also the original director for the MMORPG Final Fantasy XI and continued to be a central team member throughout the development of its first expansion, Rise of the Zilart. His guiding principle throughout the initial development cycle, according to a 2016 interview, was to both create compelling world and setting for the game as well as emphasize teamwork among players.

On the topic of creating the game's world, Vana'diel, he stated: "[FFXI is] a sandbox, I suppose. "There's the toy, let's dig holes and build castles," players would think. Creating an atmosphere where that will bring satisfaction was the goal." To support this design pattern, he claims to have deliberately spent time adding small atmospheric touches such as rainbows, hidden areas only reachable through exploration, auroras, flowers, and other "spontaneous events" that would draw the player into the game world. Ishii describes these as being quite important despite his perception of others viewing them as "pointless events."

In a Famitsu interview, he was quite vocal about using game mechanics to attempt to sculpt player behavior toward cooperation and teamwork. Ishii claims credit (alongside Hiroshi Takai, credited as an assistant director of Final Fantasy XIV) for FFXI's skillchain system, by which players cooperate to time weapon skill abilities in concert to achieve bonus damage to an enemy monster. He explains that he created the system because he "thought it was important to create a sense of teamwork even while playing with strangers, and to that end [he] created the skillchain system." Two other areas he designed with teamwork in mind were the game economy and an EXP penalty upon death. The game economy was designed to make the player feel "insignificant" by emphasizing "production, consumption, and distribution," with the end goal of "understanding the importance of community." In a similar fashion, Ishii enforced an EXP penalty upon character death in FFXI because the player would "feel empathy for [his or her] teammates when they got knocked out."

== Personal life ==
He joined game developer Grezzo in April 2007. He has two sons, the first being born in April 1992.

== Style and reception ==
IGN named Ishii as one of the top 100 best game creators ever. Ishii is noted for his use of an active real time battle system, a pioneering move at the time. Some critics felt that the constant switching between a battle screen and the world map made the games feel faster paced and "deeper". He was also praised for his use of cutting-edge technologies such as Mode 7 graphics to create a 3D feel.

== Works ==
Year	Title	Role
1987	Final Fantasy	Character Designer, planner, battle graphics designer
1988	Final Fantasy II	Character Designer, game designer
1989	The Final Fantasy Legend	Scenario staff, card graphics designer
1990	Final Fantasy III	Job character design
1991	Final Fantasy Adventure	Director, character designer, story
1993	Secret of Mana	Director, game designer, monster designer
1995	Trials of Mana	Game designer, character designer
1997	SaGa Frontier	Associate director
1999	Legend of Mana	Director
1999	Chocobo Stallion	Graphics supervisor
2002	Final Fantasy XI	Director
2003	Final Fantasy XI: Rise of the Zilart	Director
2003	Sword of Mana	Producer, game designer, original story, monster designer
2006	Children of Mana	Executive producer, game designer
2006	Dawn of Mana	Director, producer
2006	Mario Hoops 3-on-3	Graphics supervisor
2006	Final Fantasy V Advance	Graphics supervisor
2007	Heroes of Mana	Producer
2007	Final Fantasy Anniversary Edition	Graphics supervisor
2007	Final Fantasy II Anniversary Edition	Graphics supervisor
2007	Final Fantasy Fables: Chocobo's Dungeon	Senior Chocobo wrangler
2007	Final Fantasy Fables: Chocobo Tales	Senior Chocobo wrangler
2010	Line Attack Heroes	Senior producer
2011	The Legend of Zelda: Ocarina of Time 3D	Producer
2011	The Legend of Zelda: Four Swords Anniversary Edition	Producer
2013	Flower Town	Senior producer
2015	The Legend of Zelda: Majora's Mask 3D	Producer
2017	Ever Oasis	Director, producer, art supervisor
2018	Luigi's Mansion	Producer
2019	The Legend of Zelda: Link's Awakening	General manager
2023	Jet Dragon	Director, producer
2024	Visions of Mana	Monster design supervisor
2024	The Legend of Zelda: Echoes of Wisdom	General manager
