= Sword of Mana =

2003 video game

- North American box art
- Developers: Square Enix; Brownie Brown
- Publishers: JP: Square Enix; NA/PAL: Nintendo
- Director: Takeo Oin
- Producer: Koichi Ishii
- Designers: Koichi Ishii; Takeo Oin
- Artists: Shinichi Kameoka; Kouji Tsuda
- Writers: Yoshinori Kitase (original storyline); Miwa Shoda (adaptation)
- Composer: Kenji Ito
- Series: Mana
- Platform: Game Boy Advance
- Release: JP: August 29, 2003; NA: December 1, 2003; EU: March 18, 2004
- Genre: Action role-playing
- Mode: Single-player

Sword of Mana, originally released in Japan as Shin'yaku: Seiken Densetsu (新約(しんやく) 聖剣伝説(せいけんでんせつ); lit. A New Testament: The Legend of the Sacred Sword), is a 2003 action role-playing game developed by Square Enix and Brownie Brown and published by Square Enix and Nintendo for the Game Boy Advance. It is an enhanced remake of the first game in the Mana series, the Game Boy game Seiken Densetsu: Final Fantasy Gaiden, which was released as Final Fantasy Adventure in North America and as Mystic Quest in Europe. Sword of Mana was the fifth release in the series. Set in a high fantasy universe, the game follows an unnamed hero and heroine as they seek to defeat the Dark Lord and defend the Mana Tree from enemies who wish to misuse its power.

While incorporating gameplay elements from the original game and generally following the same plot, Sword of Mana has new gameplay mechanics and a much more involved story. It removes elements of the Final Fantasy series present in the original game as a marketing ploy, while adding in gameplay elements and artistic styles from later games in the series. The plot is modified to allow the player to follow the parallel stories of either the hero or the heroine, and the backstory and dialogue is expanded from the original. Sword of Mana was produced by series creator Koichi Ishii, directed by Takeo Oin, and largely developed by employees of Brownie Brown who had previously worked on the series for Square.

The game received weakly positive reviews from critics. Reviewers praised the graphics of the game, as well as its enhancements to the original version. They were generally dismissive of the plot, even with enhancements, and disliked elements of the gameplay, especially the computer-controlled ally. Critics recommended the game mainly to fans of the genre or the series. Final Fantasy Adventure received a second remake in 2016, Adventures of Mana.

== Gameplay ==
A battle featuring the two protagonists. The hero is the currently selected character, and his health and magic points gauges are shown at the bottom, while the heroine's are shown at the upper right. They are fighting Rabites, a common enemy from the series.

The gameplay of Sword of Mana is an expanded and modified version of the gameplay of the action role-playing game Final Fantasy Adventure, with elements added from later games in the Mana series. Like previous games in the series, Sword of Mana displays a top-down perspective, in which the player characters navigate the terrain and fight off hostile creatures. Unlike the original game, the terrain is in color, is not composed of square tiles, and the player is not restricted to moving only in the cardinal directions. At the beginning of the game the player chooses to follow the story of either the unnamed hero or heroine, and controls them thereafter. The player is often joined by either the unchosen protagonist or by temporary companions, and at any point during battles can choose to take direct control of the other party member instead of their chosen character. The non-selected character is controlled via artificial intelligence. Unlike prior games in the series, Sword of Mana does not have a direct multiplayer component. Instead, players can connect their Game Boy Advances together via a Link Cable to give their characters powerful attacks to be used at a later time, known as the "Amigo" system. The original game featured no multiplayer capabilities.

The two main characters have different capabilities. Both are capable of using weapons and magic, but the hero is stronger with melee weapons and the heroine is stronger with ranged magical attacks. Weapons have three attributes: slash, jab, and bash; and different attributes cause more or less damage to different enemies. Magical spells can cause damage or defend the protagonists, and are affected by the weapon the character is holding. Combat takes place in real-time. Located at the bottom of the screen is an overdrive gauge that increases by one point at each hit given to an enemy. When that gauge is full, the player can release a powerful attack that will deplete the gauge completely if the attack lands. Upon collecting enough experience points in battle, each character increases in level and improves in areas such as strength and evasion.

The player can rest in towns, where they can regain hit points or purchase restorative items and equipment. Options such as changing equipment, casting spells, or checking status are performed by cycling through the game's Ring Commands, a circular menu which hovers over the currently controlled party member. The Ring Command menu, which lets the player pause the game in combat to select different weapons, spells, and items, was not present in the original game, but was present in the sequels Secret of Mana and Trials of Mana. A version of the day-and-night system introduced in Trials of Mana was added to the game, whereby some enemies are only present at different times of day, which changes whenever the player enters a new area. Much like Legend of Mana, players can forge weapons and plant produce in an orchard in the game's "Hot House" feature.

== Plot ==
Sword of Mana has a similar story to Final Fantasy Adventure with additional details and dialogue added. The player has the choice to follow the story of either the hero or the heroine, who are named by the player, instead of only the hero as in the original game. The two stories parallel each other, and the two protagonists are often together.

The hero's story begins with a flashback dream of the death of his parents at the hands of the Dark Lord, the ruler of the nation of Granz. Upon waking, the hero, a gladiator-slave in Granz, attempts to escape before being confronted by the Dark Lord and thrown off of a bridge. After being fished out of a lake, the hero is advised to head to the city of Topple. The heroine's story also begins with a flashback dream of the Dark Lord and his assistant, Julius, killing her stepmother and destroying her village. Upon awaking, she is advised by the knight Bogard to head to Topple, while he journeys to the city of Wendell. The hero and heroine meet in Topple, and agree to journey together. They head toward Wendell, and along the way discover that women of the Mana tribe, which the heroine belongs to, are being kidnapped by vampires. The heroine is kidnapped, and is rescued by the hero and an unnamed man; they discover that the kidnappings are to keep the woman safe from the Dark Lord and Julius, who are killing them all in part because the tribe was unable to save the Dark Lord's mother from a terrible fate.

In Wendell, the two protagonists learn that Bogard and several other knights were instrumental in overthrowing the Vandole Empire twenty years prior, which had been abusing Mana, the source of magic. The hero states his intention to find the legendary Mana Sword in order to avenge his parents and the heroine reveals she has a pendant from her stepmother that is the key to the Mana Tree, the source of Mana. The unnamed man then reveals himself to be Julius and kidnaps the heroine for the pendant; during a failed rescue attempt the hero falls from an airship along with the pendant. After a side story resulting in the hero and heroine killing the Dark Lord's mother, who had been turned into a monster, the pendant is stolen and given to the Dark Lord. The protagonists chase after him. After the two defeat the Dark Lord, Julius reveals himself to be the last survivor of the Vandole Empire. Once gaining the pendant he mind controlled the heroine to use the pendant to give him control of the Mana Tree, which Vandole had attempted to do prior to being overthrown. Julius defeats the hero and heroine, and heads off to the Mana Tree.

The hero and heroine split up to find the Mana Sword. After the hero passes trials to prove himself worthy of the sword, which first appears as a rusty blade, the two join forces to storm the Mana Tree and defeat Julius. They do so, but the tree is killed in the process; prior to death, the tree reveals that she was the heroine's mother, and asks the heroine to replace her as the next Mana Tree. The heroine agrees, and the two protagonists part ways.

== Development ==
=== Origin ===
After the release of the previous game in the Mana series, 1999's Legend of Mana, several members of the development team for the game left Square to form a new development studio, Brownie Brown. These included character designer Kameoka Shinichi and lead artist Kouji Tsuda, as well as several other writers and artists. The crew that stayed was merged with those behind Parasite Eve II, Brave Fencer Musashi and Chrono Cross to make Final Fantasy XI. Square, in turn, outsourced development of the fifth game in the Mana series to Brownie Brown. The producer for the game was Square's Koichi Ishii, who had directed or designed the previous games in the series. Ishii had served as the director for the original game in the series, Final Fantasy Adventure, of which Sword of Mana is a remake.

=== Game design ===
The remake, in addition to adding enhanced graphics to the original Game Boy title, sought to add elements present in later games in the series, such as the Ring Command menu system, and to expand the game's storyline. It also removed elements from the Final Fantasy series, which had been placed in the original game as a part of the marketing for the game before its sequels moved to be a distinct series. The ability to play as the heroine was added, and an element of multiplayer features that the series had become known for was added by allowing two players to link their Game Boy Advances together to trade items.

=== Character design ===
The hero was designed to show a lot of skin in order to convey his slave status. To help the character stand out when converted to pixel art design, cross patterns were added to the back of his gloves and his shoulder pads. For the heroine, her design was guided to make her look both like a warrior and a princess. Bogard, who in Final Fantasy Adventure has a "gentlemanly" look was made to look more like a ruffian or hermit.

The Eight Mana Spirits were designed to look like three-dimensional characters from a storybook. In order to hide the Dark Lord's identity, a mask was designed so that this aspect of the plot could remain hidden until later on in the game. Game illustrator Shinichi Kameoka stated that he was told to design Julius to look like a neutral character. Kameoka stated he also tried to make Julius look “like a girl”.

== Release ==
Square announced in August 2002 that a Mana game for the Game Boy Advance was under development, and in early 2003 announced that the game was a remake of Final Fantasy Adventure and would be released in Japan later that year under the name Shinyaku Seiken Densetsu. On April 24, 2003, Square Enix, formed from the merger of Square and Enix during the game's development, announced that Sword of Mana would have North American and European releases as well. While Legend of Mana had been released worldwide, Trials of Mana had only been released in Japan. In July 2003, IGN listed the game as one of the top ten most anticipated Game Boy Advance games of 2003. Sword of Mana was released in Japan on August 29, 2003, in North America on December 1, and in Europe on March 18, 2004. In Japan, a special edition "Mana Blue"-colored Game Boy Advance SP was released on the same date as the game, packaged with Sword of Mana and a carrying case. Those who purchased the game's soundtrack and strategy guide between August 27 and September 30, 2003, were given the opportunity to win a Cactus character cushion and a cellphone strap.

=== Music ===
Sword of Mana Premium Soundtrack

Soundtrack album by Kenji Ito
- Released: August 27, 2003; October 20, 2004
- Genre: Video game soundtrack
- Length: 1:42:51
- Labels: DigiCube; Square Enix (reprint)

The score for Sword of Mana was composed by Kenji Ito, the composer for the original Final Fantasy Adventure. The music includes reworked tracks from the original game as well as new material. Ito's music is mainly inspired by images from the game rather than outside influences; however, he never played either the original game or the remake. The 2003 Sword of Mana Premium Soundtrack album collects 47 tracks of music from the game. The two-disc album contains over an hour and a half of music and was published by DigiCube, with a 2004 reprint by Square Enix. The first disc contains music directly from the game, while the second disc features seven piano arrangements by Ito of songs from the soundtrack. The first edition of the soundtrack included a bonus disc, containing an orchestral arrangement of "Rising Sun ~ Endless Battlefield". The album reached position #118 on the Japan Oricon charts, and stayed on the charts for only one week. Music from the soundtrack has been arranged for the piano and published by DOREMI Music Publishing. Additionally, KMP Music Publishing has published a book of sheet music for the piano tracks included in the album.

== Reception ==
Reception

Aggregate scores
Aggregator	Score
GameRankings	71% (35 reviews)
Metacritic	72/100 (31 reviews)

Review scores
Publication	Score
1Up.com	6.5 out of 10
Edge	6 out of 10
Electronic Gaming Monthly	6 out of 10
Famitsu	30 out of 40
Game Informer	7.75 out of 10
GamePro	4 out of 5
GameSpot	7.1 out of 10
GameSpy	3 out of 5
IGN	7 out of 10

Sword of Mana sold over 277,000 copies in Japan in 2003. It received positive reviews from critics. The game's presentation was praised, especially its graphics; Brad Shoemaker of GameSpot praised the "lush, colorful backgrounds" and animation quality, which was seconded by the reviewer for GamePro. Game Informer's Justin Leeper also felt that the graphics were beautiful, and Shane Bettenhausen of Electronic Gaming Monthly said it was "one of the most stunning games on [the] GBA". Kevin Gifford of 1UP.com also praised the graphics in relation to other Game Boy Advance games, while Darryl Vassar of GameSpy said that it would have been the best-looking Game Boy Advance game if were not for what he felt was poor animation quality. Reaction to the music was more mixed; while the reviews for Game Informer and GamePro praised it, Shoemaker of GameSpot termed the music "mostly bland" and Craig Harris of IGN and GameSpy's Vassar said it was nice but repetitive. Reviewers also noted technical problems with the presentation: both the GameSpot and IGN reviews noted graphical glitches in the game as marring the presentation.

The game's plot was widely dismissed; IGN's Harris termed it "a little on the basic side" and "borderline silly", which 1UP.com's Gifford amended to just "silly", with "needlessly-long dialogue". Vassar of GameSpy felt that the added dialogue simply unjustly inflated a simple story. Shoemaker of GameSpot called it "quaintly simplistic", while the Electronic Gaming Monthly review said it was one of the biggest problems with the game.

Elements of the gameplay were also poorly received. The computer-controlled companion was almost universally derided: Bettenhausen of Electronic Gaming Monthly said they were "nearly useless", as did Gifford of 1UP.com, Shoemaker of GameSpot called them "just plain dumb", and IGN's Harris said it was "the absolute pits" and "definitely the weakest aspect" of the game. The GamePro, GameSpot, and GameSpy reviews found issues with the combat mechanics, and the GameSpot and IGN reviewers felt the game was too easy. 1UP.com's Gifford felt that the boss battles were too easy, and that the weapon-switching system was needlessly complicated. IGN's Harris and Game Informer's Leeper found the day/night system to be odd and unnecessary, and Harris additionally felt that the multiplayer system was underwhelming. Shoemaker of GameSpot concluded that the game was "pretty good", and recommended it for fans of the genre, while Leeper of Game Informer and Bettenhausen of Electronic Gaming Monthly said that it was "decent" and "worth a look for fans" of the series. The Japanese magazine Famitsu said that it was a good update to Final Fantasy Adventure without innovating the gameplay much beyond the original game.

=== Legacy ===
Sword of Mana was adapted into manga form by author Shiro Amano and published by Enterbrain on February 25, 2004. Two novels based on the game were written by Matsui Oohama with illustrations by Yumiko Murakami and were also published by Enterbrain on February 27, 2004. Square Enix also produced a book of yonkoma comics based on the game on January 16, 2004. Final Fantasy Adventure received a second remake in 2016, Adventures of Mana.
