= Final Fantasy Adventure =

1991 video game

- North American cover art
- Developer: Square
- Publishers: Square; EU: Nintendo
- Director: Koichi Ishii
- Designers: Goro Ohashi; Yoshinori Kitase
- Programmers: Satoru Yoshieda; Masaaki Saito
- Artists: Kazuko Shibuya; Koichi Ishii
- Writers: Koichi Ishii; Yoshinori Kitase
- Composer: Kenji Ito
- Series: Final Fantasy; Mana
- Platforms: Game Boy, mobile phone, Nintendo Switch
- Release: Game Boy: JP: June 28, 1991; NA: November 1991; EU: June 17, 1993; Mobile (Remake): JP: August 16, 2006; Switch (Collection of Mana): JP: June 1, 2017; WW: June 11, 2019
- Genre: Action role-playing
- Mode: Single-player

Final Fantasy Adventure, known in Japan as Seiken Densetsu: Final Fantasy Gaiden (Note: Japanese: 聖剣伝説 〜ファイナルファンタジー外伝〜; lit. The Legend of the Sacred Sword: Final Fantasy Gaiden) or simply Seiken Densetsu, (Note: Japanese: 聖剣伝説; lit. Legend of the Sacred Sword) and later released in Europe as Mystic Quest, is a 1991 action role-playing game developed and published by Square for the Game Boy. It is a spin-off of the Final Fantasy series and the first game in the Mana series.

Originally developed under the name Gemma Knights, it features gameplay roughly similar to that of the original The Legend of Zelda, but with the addition of role-playing statistical elements. A remake, Sword of Mana, was released for the Game Boy Advance in 2003, changing the plot and many gameplay aspects. A second remake was released on mobile phones in Japan which improved the graphics and music of the original version. A third remake, Adventures of Mana, was released for iOS, Android, and PlayStation Vita on February 4, 2016.

The story follows the hero and the heroine as they attempt to thwart the Dark Lord of Glaive and his sorcerer assistant, Julius, from destroying the Tree of Mana and dooming their world. The game was released with many familiar elements of the Final Fantasy series, such as chocobos, but these were later changed to feature common enemies and the gameplay style of the Mana series.

Final Fantasy Adventure was met with generally positive reviews at the time of its release. Over the course of time, reviewers have considered it one of the best action adventure games on the Game Boy. The game also spawned an entirely new game series, called the Mana series, which became a successful video game role-playing franchise. Its sequel, Secret of Mana, was released in 1993. A port for mobile was released on Mobile in Japan in 2006. A port was also released as part of the Collection of Mana on Nintendo Switch in 2017 and 2019.

== Gameplay ==
Hero attacking an enemy with the sickle weapon

The gameplay is similar to the original The Legend of Zelda for the NES: the world is viewed from a top-down camera angle, it is divided up into many different squares that can fit on the screen, and the main character can move up, down, left, and right across the screen. The player can interact with individuals within towns by gathering information and buying or selling items and equipment. A variety of enemies can be battled on a field screen to gain experience, GP, and items. Within dungeon areas, a number of puzzles may be present and required to be solved in order for the player to advance. The player can also save at any point. A number of weapons can be found throughout the game to maneuver through obstacles such as cutting through trees and thorns.

The main character possesses several statistics, including hit points, power, and stamina, which can all increase upon gaining an experience level. Magic spells, which expend the character's MP, can be used to heal oneself or damage enemies. These spells can only be found in certain locations or obtained from other characters at specific plot intervals. In addition, the protagonist has a power gauge that affects his attack strength—the higher the gauge, the stronger his attack will be. The speed at which it fills is directly affected by the character's will level. The gauge will slowly fill up over time, but once the main character attacks, the gauge is emptied. When the gauge is completely filled up and the main character attacks with a weapon, he will perform a special attack.

One additional non-player character may occasionally accompany the main character in the story and can perform different activities to aid the main character in his quest. The game introduced the ability to kill townspeople, something that many role-playing video games of the time lacked.

== Plot ==
The Hero (named by the player, officially called Sumo) is a prisoner of the Dark Lord. One day, the Hero's friend informs him of the Dark Lord's goals, and he urges him to seek a Knight named Bogard. As the Hero escapes imprisonment, he learns that the Dark Lord is seeking a key to the Mana Sanctuary in order to control the Mana Tree, an energy source that sustains life. The Hero is befriended by the Heroine (named by the player, officially called Fuji) who is also seeking Bogard. The two find Bogard, who recommends they seek out a man named Cibba. During their journey to meet him, the Heroine is kidnapped. With the aid of a mysterious man, she is later rescued by the Hero. When they meet Cibba, he plays a message left by the Heroine's mother, who reveals she is a descendant of the guardians of the Mana Tree and her pendant is the key to it. The mysterious man, upon discovering that the heroine holds the pendant, reveals himself to be Julius, the Dark Lord's advisor, and kidnaps her. The Hero then attempts to rescue the Heroine, but he fails and is knocked off of Julius's airship. However, the Heroine gives the Hero the pendant just before he falls.

The Hero is then reunited with Amanda, an escapee from his prison, who steals the pendant in order to win her brother Lester's freedom. The mayor of Jadd, Davias, takes the pendant, but he transforms Lester into a parrot. The Hero and Amanda confront a Medusa for its tear, which will break the spell. They kill it, but Amanda is infected by the Medusa's attack, causing her to transform into one herself. The Hero reluctantly kills her, and uses her tears to break Lester's spell. Lester avenges Amanda's death by killing Davias, who reveals that he gave the pendant to the Dark Lord. The Hero confronts and defeats the Dark Lord; however, Hero discovers that the Heroine is under Julius' mind control and has opened the entrance to the Mana Tree. Julius reveals he is the last survivor of the Vandole Empire, the empire who attempted to control the Mana Tree years ago, and handily defeats the Hero.

Realizing he is powerless to defeat Julius, the Hero learns from Cibba about a powerful sword called Excalibur. Cibba helps him find the Excalibur only to find a rusty sword instead. He explains that the rusty sword is the Excalibur and would reveal its true strength to whoever it finds worthy. The Hero then raises Dime Tower to reach the Mana Sanctuary and meets a robot known as Marcie. After reaching the top, the tower begins to collapse and Marcie sacrifices himself by throwing the Hero across. After obtaining and passing the sword's trials, the Hero confronts and defeats Julius at the cost of the Mana Tree's life. The Mana Tree reveals that she is the Heroine's mother and before dying, asks the Heroine to succeed her current position. The Heroine agrees and bids farewell to the Hero as she becomes the next Mana Tree, and the Hero her guardian.

== Development ==
Square trademarked Seiken Densetsu in 1987 intending to use it for a game project subtitled The Emergence of Excalibur, and led by Kazuhiko Aoki for the Famicom Disk System. According to early advertisements, the game would consist of an unprecedented five floppy disks, making it one of the largest titles developed for the Famicom up until that point. Although Square solicited pre-orders for the game, Kaoru Moriyama, a former Square employee, affirms that management canceled the ambitious project before it advanced beyond the early planning stages. In October 1987, customers who had placed orders were sent a letter informing them of the cancellation and had their purchases refunded. The letter also suggested to consider placing an order on another upcoming Square role-playing game in a similar vein: Final Fantasy.

After the release of the third Final Fantasy title in 1990, Square offered designer Koichi Ishii to direct a spin-off series game. It began development for the Game Boy under the working title Gemma Knights; eventually, Square revived the trademarked name and released the game as Seiken Densetsu: Final Fantasy Gaiden. It was later released in Europe as Mystic Quest. Ishii suggested the basis of the game's story, while scenario writer Yoshinori Kitase helped write the game's script. Ishii designed all of the characters himself, while Goro Ohashi was responsible for the development of the game system.

The Mana series, of which Final Fantasy Adventure was the first game, was the result of Koichi Ishii's desire to create a fictional world. In Ishii's opinion, Mana is not a series of video games, but rather a world which is illustrated by and can be explored through video games. When working on the series, Koichi Ishii drew inspiration from abstract images from his memories of childhood, as well as films and fantasy books that captivated him as a child. Ishii took care to avoid set conventions, and his influences are correspondingly very wide and non-specific. Nonetheless, among his literary influences, he acknowledges Tove Jansson's Moomin, Lewis Carroll's Alice's Adventures in Wonderland, and J. R. R. Tolkien's Lord of the Rings.

=== Music ===
The Seiken Densetsu: Final Fantasy Gaiden Original Soundtrack (Note: 聖剣伝説 ファイナルファンタジー外伝 Original Soundtrack) was released in Japan on July 15, 1991. Most of the tracks were composed by Kenji Ito, while track 16, "Chocobo Tanjou (Chocobo's Birth)", is credited to Square composer Nobuo Uematsu. Seiken Densetsu/Arranged Version Omoi wa Shirabe ni Nosete (Note: 聖剣伝説/アレンジ・ヴァージョン・想いは調べにのせて; "Holy Sword Legend/Arranged Version Let Thoughts Ride On Knowledge"), a set of arranged tracks was also released on September 30 the same year. Both albums were compiled into Seiken Densetsu: Final Fantasy Gaiden Sound Collections, originally released on August 18, 1995. The game's music was included in a 20th anniversary CD compilation of all of the Mana series games' soundtracks. A second arranged album titled Tanoshī Baieru Heiyō Seiken Densetsu (Note: 楽しいバイエル併用 聖剣伝説; "Fun Together with Beyer: Holy Sword Legend") was released on December 10, 1998. The album was compiled by Yu Hong Ishikawa and Kushiro Negishi.

== Versions and merchandise ==
Release years by platforms
Platform	JP	NA	EU
Game Boy	1991	1991	1993
Game Boy Advance	2003	2003	2004
Cellphones	2006	N/A	N/A
PlayStation Vita, iOS, Android	2016		

In 1998, Sunsoft obtained the license for it and re-released it along with the Final Fantasy Legend games. This version was advertised as having Game Boy Color support, although the release was not enhanced in any way. RPGamer reported in July 2004 that Square Enix was polling die-hard customers, testing the feasibility of porting Final Fantasy Adventure to the Nintendo DS. GamesRadar listed Final Fantasy Adventure as one of the titles they wanted in the 3DS Virtual Console.

The game received a remake for the Game Boy Advance called Sword of Mana in 2003. The original version was remade again to mobile phones and released on August 16, 2006, for SoftBank's 3G network. It was later ported onto i-Mode distribution service on November 6 and EZweb distribution service on February 5, 2007. The gameplay of the mobile phone version is closer to the original game's design, but featuring updated graphics and sound, an improved world map, and other minor changes. The characters have been redesigned several times between each remake. A 3D remake, Adventures of Mana, was released in 2016 for PlayStation Vita, Android and iOS. A port of the original game was released with ports of Secret of Mana and Trials of Mana as part of the Seiken Densetsu Collection on June 1, 2017 in Japan and on June 11, 2019 in North America and Europe as Collection of Mana for the Nintendo Switch.

Two guidebooks have been released in Japan: Seiken Densetsu: Final Fantasy Gaiden kiso chishiki-hen (Note: 聖剣伝説 ファイナルファンタジー外伝: 基礎知識編, lit. Holy Sword Legend Final Fantasy Supplementary Story Basic Knowledge) and Seiken Densetsu Final Fantasy Gaiden kanzen kōryaku-hen (Note: 聖剣伝説 ファイナルファンタジー外伝 完全攻略編, lit. Holy Sword Legend Final Fantasy Supplementary Story Advance Knowledge), each of which contains character illustrations and manga. The guidebooks were released in May and August 1991 respectively.

=== Other manga ===
Final Fantasy Adventure is one of the video games featured in the manga titled Rock'n Game Boy, by Shigeto Ikehara and published by Comic BomBom from October 1989 to December 1991.

== Reception ==
Reception

Aggregate score
Aggregator	Score
GameRankings	79%

Review scores
Publication	Score
ACE	820/1000
Famitsu	9/10, 9/10, 9/10, 6/10
GameZone	90%
IGN	9/10
RPGamer	3/5
RPGFan	92%
Nintendojo	8.7/10

According to Square's publicity department, the game sold 700,000 units worldwide, with 500,000 of these sold in Japan.

Final Fantasy Adventure was featured in Nintendo Power when it was re-released in the United States. IGN praised the Game Boy re-release version noting its strong story, graphics, and music. They additionally praised the game's puzzle elements as innovative and drew comparisons to The Legend of Zelda: Link's Awakening, though noted that its role-playing gameplay did not blend well with its action-oriented nature. RPGFan also praised the game and called it one of the best RPG titles for Game Boy. RPGamer praised the game's plot and the characters. Nintendojo also gave similar praise to the game but noting it being vastly different from other Final Fantasy titles.

The game has been perceived very positively in the years following its initial release. GameDaily named it alongside the other Game Boy Final Fantasy titles as definitive games for the system, describing it as providing "hours of role-playing" to play. The sentiment was shared by gaming magazine Pocket Games, which ranked the titles together 8th out of the Top 50 games for the Game Boy, stating that every game in the series is a classic with well-written scripts and solid characters. Kotaku praised the original release of the game as a "really great action-RPG". 1UP.com called the game ambitious for its time, writing that it represented an evolution of the overhead perspective action adventure genre. They also rated the game as "Worth It!" in terms of buying and enjoying the original game in 2007, and noted it as the origins of the Mana series' many unique gameplay features. GamesRadar named it the 13th best Game Boy game ever made, noting that its interesting leveling system and a large number of collectible items made up for a poor English translation. Game Informer also praised the game's leveling system, though it did call it a "simplistic" title in comparison to its sequels.
