= Angela (Trials of Mana) =

Trials of Mana character

- Mana character
- Angela in Trials of Mana (1995)
- First appearance: Trials of Mana (1995)
- Designed by: Koichi Ishii (concept); Nobuteru Yūki (final design); HACCAN (2020)

Angela (Japanese: アンジェラ, Hepburn: Anjera) is a character in the 1995 video game Trials of Mana. She is one of its six protagonists, able to be selected as either the main character or a supporting character to one of the others. She is the princess of the kingdom of Altena, which is in perpetual springtime due to her mother's magic. When she discovers that her mother intends to sacrifice her to maintain this springtime, she flees, traveling to get guidance from the Priest of Light. She is connected to the character Duran, who was intended by the design team to have more romantic elements featured, which were excluded due to a lack of room in the game. Her design was created by Nobuteru Yūki and Koichi Ishii, featuring long purple hair and a red bunny suit. She is voiced in Japanese by Rumi Okubo in the remake.

== Concept and creation ==
Angela was created for Trials of Mana, her design finalized by manga and anime artist Nobuteru Yūki based on concept art by Koichi Ishii. She was designed to be a slightly more adult take on the character Primm from Secret of Mana, though featuring the worries an adult woman might have. When designing her, Ishii wanted to give her a strong princess design, but also wanted to depict her as lonely. To do this, he evoked the character Non Go from Majokko Megu-chan. He felt that a bunny suit suited this kind of character. Her design in the remake was created by the artist HACCAN. Her design was originally contrasted to another female character in the game, Riesz, who was intended to be depicted as a "chubby, healthy girl" while Angela would be depicted as "slender but sexy." However, Riesz was later changed to be similarly sexy and slim. Initially, she was intended to have a "subtle romantic" attraction between Angela and the character Duran, which ultimately had to be left out due to a lack of space. In the remake, scenes between Angela and Duran were added. Trials of Mana producer Masaru Oyamada described Angela as a more mature character, though still having childlike qualities. Ishii noted that she behaves selfishly and teases people to get attention, explaining that her inability to get affection or attention from her mother contributed to this behavior. She is voiced in Japanese by Rumi Okubo in the remake.

== Appearances ==
Angela appears in the video game Trials of Mana for the Super Famicom as one of its six protagonists, appearing alongside characters Duran, Hawkeye, Charlotte, Kevin, and Riesz. Players are able to choose from one of these six characters as their main character; if Angela is not chosen as the main character, she can instead be selected as one of the player's other two party members.

Angela is the princess of the kingdom of Altena, which is covered in ice except for the citadel, which is set in spring due to magic by her mother, Valda. Angela lacked attention and upbringing from her mother growing up, leading to her being lonely. She is also unable to use magic, a rarity among Altenans. Due to the mana supply of the world beginning to fade, winter begins to creep into the citadel, Valda, on the suggestion of the Crimson Wizard, invades other nations to steal their Mana Stones to use a spell to get the mana from these crystals, and eventually, infinite mana from the Sword of Mana. Due to the power of the spell, it requires the user to sacrifice themselves, leading her to have Angela be sacrificed instead. Angela, having overheard this, unintentionally uses magic to teleport out of the kingdom into snowy fields before collapsing due to the cold. She is nursed back to health, and travels to seek the advice of the Priest of Light.

Angela has appeared in other video games in playable and non-playable roles. She is a playable character in Circle of Mana, whereas she makes cameos in Final Fantasy Brave Exvius and Super Smash Bros. Ultimate.

== Reception ==
Angela has generally been a popular character among certain fans, noted by Inside Games writer Shingema as being popular for being sexy. Angela was named the second-best protagonist in Trials of Mana. In an Inside Games poll, readers voted Angela the second-best Trials of Mana female character, losing to the winner, Riesz, by one vote. Another poll asked readers who they chose to play as, and who they chose as a companion. Angela was in fifth place of the six characters for the former, but in third place for the latter. Despite coming short of Riesz's popularity, Inside Games writer Gamachi Gen appreciated the progress Angela made in her popularity. Inside Games writer "Crossing Ryujin Bridge" praised her animations and sex appeal, calling the execution "extremely wonderful" while noting that her costumes were a hot topic among fans. RPGFan staff praised Angela's English voice acting as the best in the remake alongside Hawkeye, also commenting on how fun it was for Angela to be so sassy and rude. They noted how they were amused by how she spent much of her time as a partner character complaining or wanting to sleep. They felt that, while the original game had Angela as one of the worst characters due to magic being weak and being unable to modify her and her opponents' stats, she is one of the strongest in the remake.

Siliconera writer Jenni Lada noted how useful she was as a character due to her versatility in basically any team build. Lada also appreciated the backstory behind Angela and how heartbreaking it is, talking about how, despite coming off like an "attention-seeking brat," her backstory justified it since her mother was emotionally distant and she was unable to learn magic, causing her to seek bad attention since she was unable to get good attention. Despite Inside Games writer Shingema identifying Riesz as his favorite character in Trials of Mana, he ultimately switch to being an Angela fan after playing the Trials of Mana remake. He discussed how she has changed from the Super Famicom version to the remake, comparing her design glowup to one that a female classmate might experience after summer vacation. He felt that her art from the Super Famicom version evoked 90s heroines in anime such as Slayers and Tenchi-Muyo! While discussing her voice actress, Rumi Okubo, he praised her for giving her a cute voice without being overtly sexy, suggesting that she was portraying her as a modern-day girl. He also suggested that her sexy design and personality contributed to her characterization, noting her willingness to touch upon certain sexual topics that Riesz and Charlotte would not.
