= Charlotte (Trials of Mana) =

Trials of Mana character

- Mana character
- Charlotte in Trials of Mana (1995)
- First appearance: Trials of Mana (1995)
- Designed by: Koichi Ishii (concept); Nobuteru Yūki (final design); HACCAN (2020)

Charlotte (Japanese: シャルロット, Hepburn: Sharurotto) is a character in the 1995 video game Trials of Mana. She is one of its six protagonists, able to be selected as either the main character or a supporting character to one of the others. She is connected to the character Kevin, who was intended by the design team to have more romantic scenes featured, but were excluded due to a lack of room in the game. Her design was created by Nobuteru Yūki and Koichi Ishii, and in the Trials of Mana remake, she was designed by HACCAN and voiced by Sumire Morohoshi in Japanese.

Reception to Charlotte was mixed, mainly due to how her dialogue was handled, with critics complaining about her tendency to swap Rs and Ls with Ws. Her voice work in the English version of the remake received particular scrutiny, with multiple critics finding that they were uninterested in having her in their party due to the dialogue.

== Concept and creation ==
Charlotte was created for Trials of Mana, her design finalized by manga and anime artist Nobuteru Yūki based on concept art by Koichi Ishii. Her design in the Trials of Mana remake was created by the artist HACCAN. Discussing her design, Ishii conceived Charlotte as a doll wearing an outfit that combined the concepts of an Italian festival costume and baby clothes, aiming to make a "cheerful and energetic young girl." He aimed for players to have a different impression of her cheerful designs after experiencing her story and the "deep sadness inside her." Her dialogue was written by game producer Hiromichi Tanaka. She was initially conceived as a "dependable, serious, down-to-earth character," but due to the art by Yūki, which producer described as "bright and cheerful," they opted to make give her a cuter character and disposition.

In the Japanese version, her dialogue is mostly written in hiragana. Another aspect of her dialogue in Japanese was that she ends her words with "dechi." Ishii clarified that they considered dechi instead of a more common "dechuu" due to how prominent dechuu was. In English, her dialogue replaces her Ls and Rs with Ws as part of a speech impediment. Ishii described Charlotte as going through the worst of the game's main cast, though still retaining her cheer and optimism, comparing her to the character Popoi from Secret of Mana, who was also made by Tanaka. Initially, she was intended to have a "subtle romantic" attraction between Charlotte and the character Kevin, which ultimately had to be left out due to a lack of space. She is voiced in Japanese by Sumire Morohoshi in the remake, who found her relatable due to her similar age, also discussing their similar timidity. She found her lines cute and fun to read.

== Appearances ==
Charlotte appears in the video game Trials of Mana for the Super Famicom as one of its six protagonists, appearing alongside characters Kevin, Riesz, Duran, Angela, and Hawkeye. Players are able to choose from one of these six characters as their main character; if Charlotte is not chosen as the main character, she can instead be selected as one of the player's other two party members that can be encountered later on. If not selected as one of these three characters, she is not involved in the story. Charlotte was born in Dior, a haven for elves, her grandfather being the Priest of Light, who mentors another priest named Heath. Heath is sent to investigate evil influences, and Charlotte follows him, trying to stop him. However, he is ultimately kidnapped, forcing Charlotte to pursue him so she can save him.

== Reception ==
Charlotte has been met with mixed reception from both fans and critics. In an Inside Games poll, Charlotte was the least likely choice as a main character, receiving only 2.5 percent of the vote. However, when polled about who they picked for their two supporting character slots, Charlotte was number one, chosen by almost half of respondents, with Inside Games writer Shingema expressing appreciation for her popularity. In an Inside Games poll about female characters in Trials of Mana, she ranked third behind Angela and Riesz, with staff noting that respondents felt that her version in the remake made her more appealing than she was in the original.

Charlotte's English voice performance in the 2020 remake was the subject of criticism by multiple critics, with Game Informer writer Daniel Tack suggesting that her "childlike intonations" felt out of place and was akin to "nails on a chalkboard." GameSpot writer Steve Watts regretted featuring her in his party, finding her speech impediment obnoxious. He lamented how valuable a character she was, however, and elected to keep playing with her because she was the only dedicated healer in the game. Meanwhile, Kotaku writer Mike Fahey opted to start over when he encountered her in his game after choosing her, finding her vocal dialogue too unbearable. He noted that this was not the fault of the actress, but rather the localization team. He also found the Japanese version to not be a suitable alternative, as the subtitles still had the Rs and Ls switched out with Ws. Hardcore Gamer writer James Cunningham similarly opted to avoid doing her story due to how her dialogue was executed. Eurogamer writer Martin Robinson, meanwhile, suggested not choosing Charlotte even if the player is using the Japanese dub, as he found her voice annoying regardless of whether the Japanese or English dub was used. Screen Rant writer Zak Wojnar found her annoying in the remake, but felt that this was in keeping with how she was in the original, noting how she became the butt of jokes by Mana fans. VG247 writer Nadia Oxford argued that Charlotte has "always sucked," criticizing the decision to give her a lisp. PC Gamer writer James Davenport noted that Charlotte's voice had turned them off from playing the game.

Inside Games writer "Crossing Ryujin Bridge" noted that they weren't surprised that Charlotte was less popular than the other two female Trials of Mana characters Riesz and Angela due to their sexy designs, they nevertheless enjoyed their design and various aspects of her character. They discussed various other aspects of Charlotte's character that may turn people off, including how her dialogue was written in the Super Famicom version of the game. They suggested that most of her lines were written in hiragana to emphasize her childishness, as well as difficult-to-read lines and aggressive personality, questioning whether she was inspired by the character Popoi from Secret of Mana. They went on to discuss how the remake emphasized certain features that made her more appealing, citing improved animation and expressions, which they found cute. They also felt that the voice acting and font were improved in this game, making her easier to understand, and feeling that voice acting benefited Charlotte the most of the main cast. They felt that the voice also helped make her aggressive personality more endearing due to the cute voice.
