= Riesz (Trials of Mana) =

Trials of Mana character

- Mana character
- Riesz in Trials of Mana (1995)
- First appearance: Trials of Mana (1995)
- Designed by: Koichi Ishii (concept); Nobuteru Yūki (final design); HACCAN (2020)

Riesz (Japanese: リース, Hepburn: Rīsu) is a character in the 1995 video game Trials of Mana. She is one of its six protagonists, able to be selected as either the main character or a supporting character to one of the others. She is the princess of the kingdom of Laurent who seeks to rescue her brother Elliot and the kingdom from those who invaded it. She is connected to the character Hawkeye, who was intended by the design team to have more romantic elements featured, but were excluded due to a lack of room in the game. Her design was created by Nobuteru Yūki and Koichi Ishii, featuring long blonde hair and a green dress, with her different designs inspired by Norse mythology. She is voiced by Mikako Komatsu in the remake.

She has been generally well-received, remaining a popular character 25 years after the game's original release. She was considered a waifu by some male players, with her personality being a significant factor in this according to critics. Her design was also praised, with Inside Games writer Shingema suggesting that her color scheme contributed to her popularity, comparing it to the color scheme of Link from The Legend of Zelda.

== Concept and creation ==
Riesz was created for Trials of Mana, her design finalized by manga and anime artist Nobuteru Yūki based on concept art by Koichi Ishii. She has long blonde hair tied into a pony tail, her default outfit having a green dress and wearing a wreath on her head. Ishii commented that Riesz was originally envisioned to be an Amazonian warrior, noting that he imagined her as being a masculine character. She was also intended to be depicted as a "healthy, chubby girl" to contrast the sexy and slim Angela. However, when game designer Hiromichi Tanaka saw her design, which he described as slender with long legs, he elected to give her a manner of speech he felt fit a princess character. When discussing the different classes she can choose, Mana series producer Masaru Oyamada noted that her classes are based on Norse mythology, including her classes Vanadis, Fenrir Knight, and Valkyrie, the latter given to her because they wanted to give her a "mighty and powerful Valkyrie design."Oyamada noted how Riesz was given dark purple armor for her Valkyrie design in the original Trials of Mana, the remake had the purple limited to the design's shadows, which he felt capture her "prim and proper nature." Her design in the remake was created by the artist HACCAN. Riesz was described by Tanaka as having a brother complex due to the loss of her mother. Initially, she was intended to have a "subtle romantic" attraction between Riesz and the character Hawkeye, which ultimately had to be left out due to a lack of space. She is voiced in Japanese by Mikako Komatsu in the remake.

== Appearances ==
Riesz appears in the video game Trials of Mana for the Super Famicom as one of its six protagonists, appearing alongside characters Hawkeye, Charlotte, Duran, Kevin, and Angela. Players are able to choose from one of these six characters as their main character; if Riesz is not chosen as the main character, she can instead be selected as one of the player's other two party members that can be encountered later on. If not selected as one of these three characters, she is not involved in the main story. Riesz is the princess of the Laurent kingdom, her mother having died, which put her in the role of taking care of her younger brother, Elliot. Elliot is tricked into lowering Laurent's defense by two ninjas from the Nevarl Fortress who proceed to kidnap him and take over the castle. They then kill Riesz's father, the king, causing Riesz to make her escape, with her goal being to reclaim her kingdom and rescue her brother. She has a connection to the character Hawkeye, who hails from Nevarl Fortress, who escaped from Nevarl prior to the invasion.

Riesz has appeared in other video games in playable and non-playable roles. She is a playable character in Circle of Mana and Million Arthur Arcana Blood, whereas she made cameos in Final Fantasy Brave Exvius and Super Smash Bros. Ultimate.

== Reception ==
Riesz has been a popular character in Trials of Mana, with her popularity being maintained over 25 years since its release. In a poll by Square Enix, participants voted Riesz as the most popular of the Trial of Mana protagonists. The Gamer writer Scott Baird felt that fanservice costumes in Trials of Mana influenced her popularity, while multiple other critics have noted how players view her as their waifu. Inside Games staff felt that people view her in this way because, despite her being a strong warrior, she had a fragile, naive, and clumsy side that made people want to protect her. Designer Hiromichi Tanaka believed that her popularity derived from men being attracted to "frail, modest girls." Inside Games staff noted that, since the release of the original version, Trials of Mana seemed to focus on female characters like Riesz and Angela. They also commented that, after opening a poll ranking female Trials of Mana characters, they received multiple comments from people who were familiar with Riesz but not Trials of Mana. In the final results of this poll, Riesz and Angela received approximately the same number of votes, with both of them popular with men and women alike. Riesz's reveal in the Trials of Mana remake caused Automaton Media writer Yoshinori Sato to be particularly interested in her. He commented on how her popularity was similar to that of Tifa Lockhart from Final Fantasy VII, suggesting that fanart of Riesz helped give her a bigger public image.

FunglrGames staff considered her the best of Trials of Mana's female cast, praising various aspects of her personality, such as fighting despite being a princess as well as her spunky attitude and innocence. They discussed the relationship between Riesz and Hawkeye, noting how despite not bothering them as a child, the fact that they didn't further explore it bothered them. Inside Games writer Shingema discussed what made Riesz such a popular character, including to him. He discussed Riesz's color scheme of a green outfit and blonde hair, suggesting it helped contribute to her popularity and comparing it to Link from The Legend of Zelda, who has the same color scheme. He noted her different atmospheres when changing classes, suggesting her design was goddess-like for one of her classes and sexual and dark with another, adding that the blonde and green color helps retain her charm in any class change. He also suggested that the wreath she wears suggests nobility while still conveying an understated grace and purity. Going beyond appearance, Shingema suggested the way her relationship with Hawkeye developed was both a fascinating and bittersweet thing. The affection and care she shows for her younger brother, Elliot, was also an influencing factor for Shingema's interest in her character.
