= Trinity Trigger =

2022 video game

- Developer: Three Rings
- Publishers: JP: FuRyu; NA/EU: Xseed Games
- Director: Takumi Isobe
- Artists: Nobuteru Yuuki, Atsuko Nishida Kaza Maita
- Composer: Hiroki Kikuta
- Engine: Unity
- Platforms: Nintendo Switch, PlayStation 4, PlayStation 5, Windows
- Release: JP: September 15, 2022; NA: April 25, 2023; EU: May 16, 2023
- Genre: Action role-playing
- Modes: Single-player, multiplayer

Trinity Trigger (Note: Japanese: 聖塔神記 トリニティトリガー, Hepburn: Seitō Shinki Toriniti Torigā) is an action role-playing game published by FuRyu and developed by Three Rings for the Nintendo Switch, PlayStation 4, PlayStation 5, and Windows. The game was released in Japan on September 15, 2022, and in English by Xseed Games in mid-2023.

== Gameplay ==
The game plays as an action role-playing game similar to Secret of Mana. The player maneuvers a character to explore environments, purchase equipment and weapons in towns, and battle monsters to progress the game. A core gameplay component is collecting "Triggers", small creatures that transform into usable weapons for party members. The game features local multiplayer, but not online multiplayer.

== Story ==
The story takes places in the fantasy world of Trinitia, in ancient times, there was a battle over the control of the world between the "Gods of Order" and "Gods of Chaos". The gods choose humans to fight as warriors on their behalf, to determine control. The story follows the adventures of three main characters - Cyan, Elise, and Xantice. Cyan, an average person from a small peaceful village, learns that he has been chosen by the "Gods of Chaos" to be the "Warrior of Chaos". Cyan sets off on a journey to learn what this means, and what he has to do, alongside childhood friend Elise.

== Development and release ==
The game's existence was first teased on May 20, 2022, under the codename Project Tritri, with a website that listed development staff and some core themes of the game. The website noted the goal of the game was to create a traditional JRPG that video game players of the 1990s would find nostalgic and fun. Numerous key staff involved in other JRPGs were noted to be recruited for the project. Examples include Nobuteru Yuuki, previously involved with Chrono Cross and Trials of Mana, working on the game's world design, Hiroki Kikuta, previously involved in multiple entries in the Mana series as music composer, and Atsuko Nishida, character designer of Pokémon, as a designer. Multiplayer was included so adults who played similar games in the 1990s could play the game alongside their children or other younger video game players. While the game's official name reveal was scheduled for a week later on May 26, it was instead leaked early on May 23 by Japanese retailer Bic Camera.

The game was revealed to be titled Trinity Trigger, and be scheduled for release in Japan on September 15, 2022, for the Nintendo Switch, PlayStation 4, and PlayStation 5. A free demo of the game was made available on the Japanese Nintendo eShop on the day of its official reveal as well. At the time of Japanese announcement, there was no announcement about an English release. However, shortly before the Japanese release, an English translation was announced, with localization and publishing being done by XSeed Games, and scheduled for release in early 2023. Release dates were later announced as April 25, 2023 in North America, and May 16, 2023 in Europe. A special edition is scheduled to release in North America, featuring an artbook and full 2-disc soundtrack packaged with the game.

== Reception ==
Reception

Aggregate score
| Aggregator | Score |
|---|---|
| Metacritic | NS: 73/100 (Note: Score based on 13 reviews); PS5: 65/100 (Note: Score based on 13 reviews) |

Review scores
| Publication | Score |
|---|---|
| Famitsu | 31/40 |
| Hardcore Gamer | 4/5 |
| Nintendo Life | 8/10 |
| Nintendo World Report | 7.5/10 |
| RPGFan | 72/100 |

Trinity Trigger received "mixed or average reviews" according to review aggregator website Metacritic. Famitsu gave the game a review score an aggregate score of 31 out of 40, stemming from four score of 7, 8, 8, and 8 out of 10. RPGamer's demo review praised the game, comparing it favorably to the Mana series, noting that Trinity Trigger's similarity to Mana is comparable to that of FuRyu's The Alliance Alive to the SaGa series.
