= Secret of Evermore =

1995 video game

- North American box art
- Developer: Square USA
- Publishers: NA: Square Soft; PAL: Nintendo
- Designers: Alan Weiss; George Sinfield
- Programmer: Brian Fehdrau
- Artists: Daniel Dociu; Beau Folsom
- Writers: George Sinfield; Paul Mazurek
- Composer: Jeremy Soule
- Platform: Super Nintendo Entertainment System
- Release: NA: October 17, 1995; AU: February 22, 1996; EU: March 13, 1996
- Genre: Action role-playing
- Mode: Single-player

Secret of Evermore is an action role-playing game developed and published by Squaresoft for the Super Nintendo Entertainment System. It was released in North America on October 17, 1995, in Australia in February 1996, and in Europe in March 1996. A Japanese release was planned to follow the North American release by a few months but was ultimately cancelled.

The story of Secret of Evermore follows a boy and his shapeshifting pet dog as they are inadvertently transported to the fantasy world of Evermore. The player guides both characters through Evermore, a world composed of separate realms, each resembling a different period of real-world history: "Prehistoria" (prehistory), "Antiqua" (classical antiquity), "Gothica" (the Middle Ages), and "Omnitopia" (an imaginative future world). The gameplay shares many similarities with Secret of Mana, such as real-time battles, a ring-shaped menu system, weapons needing to 'charge' in order to attack at full power after making an attack and the ability to switch control between the two characters. Despite similar game mechanics and a similar title, it is not an entry in the Mana series.

Secret of Evermore is unique in that it is the only game developed by Square designers in North America. The game received positive reviews upon its release for its graphics and gameplay but was criticized for not being up to the expectations many reviewers had based upon the developer's previous Japanese role-playing games. The game's North American development, Mana-like game mechanics, and ambient music have since helped it to develop a cult following.

== Gameplay ==
Secret of Evermore takes many of its interface and gameplay aspects from Secret of Mana. The game consists mostly of an aerial view setting, where the boy and his dog negotiate the terrain and fend off hostile creatures. The player may choose to control either the boy or the dog, with the other being controlled by the game's artificial intelligence. Both characters can find refuge in caves or a town, where they can regain their hit points or purchase restorative items and equipment. Upon collecting enough experience points in battle, either character can increase in level with improved stats such as strength and evasion. Options including changing equipment or casting alchemy spells; checking status can be performed quickly by rotating through the game's Action Ring system. Combat takes place in real-time. Located below the player's hit points is a percentage gauge that determines the amount of damage done to an enemy, as well as how far the player can run. Swinging a weapon or running causes the gauge to fall to 0%. It then quickly recharges, allowing the character to attack at full strength or to run at full sprint once it is full. The gauge may also fill up to allowing the player to use charged attacks with equipped weapons.

The protagonist wields four different styles of weapons throughout the game: sword, spear, axe, and toward the end of the game, bazooka. Repeated use of them can increase their skill levels to a maximum of three, unlocking a new charged attack and increased range and power with each level; for instance, spears at a high enough level may be thrown at an enemy across the screen, while the swords and axes can cut swathes of destruction around the boy's vicinity. The sword, axe, and spear get replaced with a more powerful variant in each realm, resetting their skill levels. Most swords, axes, and spears can cut through vegetation, while some weapons are required to break rocks and other barriers.

The protagonist haggles with a merchant in Antiqua.

In the four worlds of Secret of Evermore, the in-game currency changes. The shopkeepers in Prehistoria exchange talons; in Antiqua, gemstones; in Gothica, gold coins; in Omnitopia, credits. There are individuals in each region who offer to convert the player's money to the local currency. In either of the game's two marketplaces (in Antiqua and Gothica, respectively), the storekeepers offer to trade in goods instead of money. Certain goods, such as rice, spices, and tapestries, can be bought using the local currency, but others must be exchanged for other goods. Most vendors only specialize in one type of good, and some rare items require an extensive amount of trading to obtain.

=== Alchemy ===
A unique element of Secret of Evermore is its magic system. To cast magic, the boy must be given an "Alchemic Formula" by one of the many non-playable characters called "Alchemists". Some Alchemists make their home in out-of-the-way areas and will dispense rare formulas if the player manages to seek them out. Unlike some role-playing games, there are no magic points needed to cast spells. Alchemy Formulas require pairs of ingredients to be used; some are available throughout the game, and others are only native to certain environments. In the primitive realms, ingredients appear such as wax, limestone, clay, and ash. In the advanced realms, however, the ingredients become more complex, for example ethanol and dry ice.

A secondary function of the dog is to "sniff out" ingredients by putting his nose to the ground and smelling for items. The player can command the dog to search the ground at any time, including in huts and cities. If all goes well, the dog will lead his human companion to a certain spot on the map where the player can uncover the unseen ingredients. With repeated use, Alchemy Formulas will increase in level, enhancing their curative, offensive, or support effectiveness. Although there are dozens of Formulas available to be found within the game, only nine can be equipped at a time. To overcome this, there are several Alchemists scattered throughout the game who offer to manage the boy's current Alchemy list; any formula that has already been learned can be stored by the Alchemist for later use.

== Plot ==
=== Setting ===
The plot revolves around a teenage boy and his dog whom the player must name. Most of the game takes place in the fictional world of Evermore. The player explores four main areas within this world, corresponding to different historical eras: Prehistoria contains cavemen and dinosaurs; Antiqua boasts a colosseum and pyramid theme; Gothica contains medieval castles and is populated by dragons; Omnitopia is a futuristic space station.

Throughout their travels the boy, in the company of his dog, often quotes or mentions fictional B movies that relate to their current situation. For example, he compares himself to "Dandy" Don Carlisle in the film Sink, Boat, Sink after washing ashore at Crustacia. In addition, the dog's body transforms based on the theme of the area that players are in: in the world of Prehistoria, the dog is transformed into a feral wolf; in the Antiqua region, he becomes a greyhound; in Gothica, he takes the form of a fancy poodle; and in Omnitopia, he becomes a robotic dog that resembles a toaster and is capable of shooting laser beams.

=== Plot ===
The story of Secret of Evermore begins with a black and white flashback to 1965, in a small town called Podunk, USA. In a laboratory situated on the roof of a mansion, a malfunction occurs which causes the area to flood with a white flash of light. Thirty years later, the game's young protagonist is leaving a theater when his pet dog chases after a cat on the street. The boy hurriedly follows him, eventually reaching a large, abandoned mansion. He discovers the hidden laboratory with a large machine built in the center. When the dog begins to chew on some wires, the pair find themselves transported to the surreal world of Evermore, beginning in the space station Omnitopia. A butler dressed in a white tailcoat greets the boy when he appears, only to lock him in a room with several attack robots. The boy manages to escape in a shuttle pod, where he finds his dog holed up in the cockpit.

The shuttle crashlanded in a dense jungle on top of a plateau. When the boy emerges, he finds a ferocious-looking wolf has replaced his dog. He decides to perform a test to see if the wolf is really his pet dog. He tosses a stick for the wolf to fetch, but the wolf retrieves a giant bone instead. The boy shrugs this off and assumes the wolf is his dog.

In each realm, the boy encounters a citizen of Podunk involved in an original experiment gone awry 30 years before. Professor Sidney Ruffleberg and his three companions were transported to Evermore but are unable to leave. The boy quickly learns the regions are manifestations of those citizens' personal utopias. Each of the three companions acts as the ruler of his or her world: Elizabeth, the Professor's niece, is the tribal chief of Prehistoria; Horace Highwater, curator of the Podunk Museum, oversees Antiqua; Camellia Bluegarden, a portly librarian, is the Queen of Gothica; Professor Ruffleberg monitors everything from Omnitopia, with his android butler, Carltron, alongside him. Within Prehistoria, Antiqua, and Gothica, the boy and his canine companion aid Elizabeth, Horace, and Camellia in thwarting attempts by Podunk citizens' robotic clones from ruling their respective areas.

The duo finally returns to Omnitopia and finds Ruffleberg, who explains everything. He and his butler Carltron once engaged in chess matches. Ruffleberg outfitted him with an intelligence chip to make him a more challenging opponent, but the upgrade backfired making Carltron more malevolent. He sabotaged the transporter to Evermore and designed the hostile beasts roaming the game. With Ruffleberg's help, the boy and his canine companion break into Carltron's room. The area is guarded by android clones of the boy and his dog, along with a giant mecha version of Carltron. At the last moment, Ruffleberg appears and deactivates Carltron, who promptly freezes in place.

With Carltron's defeat, the monsters plaguing Evermore disappear, but the world itself grows unstable. The boy returns to each world to collect Ruffleberg's companions, taking them back to the real world. In doing so, Evermore's destruction is averted, and it continues to exist without them. After the credits roll, a final scene shows Professor Ruffleberg returning Carltron to his old task of cleaning the lab. Carltron grins and rubs his hands together, implying he is not as docile as the professor believes.

== Development ==
Concept art of the game's protagonist wielding a bone as a weapon

In early 1994, the development of Secret of Evermore began at SquareSoft, the Redmond, Washington, office of the Japanese parent company Square. The concept of an "American-flavored Secret-of-Mana-like" game was dictated from overseas. Square Soft began work on the detailed storyline focused on a boy traveling with his dog through a world based on cheesy B movies. This led to popular culture references and dialog that are distinctly American for a mainstream console RPG. The game's associate producer and writer, George Sinfield, decided they would be familiar to American players. The game's working title was Vexx and the Mezmers. Producer Alan Weiss's original concept had a group of magic users who "could tell dream stories and transport the listeners into the experience, virtually". During a storytelling session, Vexx is trapped and starts to corrupt the dreams. The game was to have the player find Vexx and defeat him. Sinfield asked for its name to be changed. The studio had a naming competition which resulted in Secret of Evermore; composer Jeremy Soule claims to have been the team member who submitted the name "Evermore".

Many elements of Secret of Evermore were copied from Secret of Mana because they had proven to be effective. The size of the game was an early issue. It was decided that it would be single-player to preserve memory—it was originally planned to be only 12-megabits. However, the game doubled to 24-megabits near the end of development. Daniel Dociu designed various pieces of concept art. Using computer software, including Alias 3D modeling software running on SGI workstations, the game's artwork and design were mapped out by three animators, four background artists, and a 3D rendering artist. It was put together using the company's SAGE (Square's Amazing Graphical Editor) program, led by programmer Brian Fehdrau. Rather than having to hand off their work to the programmers, the artists and designers were able to test their ideas directly using the SAGE program. The final product of Secret of Evermore was produced using another company program, SIGIL (Square Interpreted Game Intelligence Language). One of the worlds that was cut was called Romancia "where 'everything is all flowers and sweet stuff, excessively so'. It was pink and purple".

There is a persistent misconception that the game is, or was released in lieu of, a follow-up to Secret of Mana. Other Square titles such as Final Fantasy VI and Chrono Trigger were being localized simultaneously with the production of Secret of Evermore. Fehdrau explained in an interview that Secret of Evermore was not created in place of Trials of Mana and that the team that developed Secret of Evermore was assembled from newly hired staff and would otherwise never have been assembled. Several of the team members later joined Humongous Entertainment, which spawned Cavedog Entertainment, while the rest of the team spread to other Seattle-area game studios like Electronic Arts, Boss Game Studios, Microsoft Game Studios, and Gas Powered Games, among others.

Secret of Evermore was released on October 17, 1995, in North America. In 1996, it was translated into German, French and Spanish for the non-English-speaking market in some PAL territories, including Australia and New Zealand. Some PAL versions were packaged in a large box and included a strategy guide.

=== Music ===
Jeremy Soule composed and produced the score for Secret of Evermore, his first video game project. In high school Soule was a big fan of video games, but he felt most of their scores "lacked drama and intensity". After completing high school, Soule created an experimental demo showcasing what he felt video game scores should sound like. Soule was hired by Square Soft after they had reviewed the demo to score Secret of Evermore. Soule describes it as a mix of ambient sounds and low-key music. The soundtrack was released on a CD containing 29 tracks, the first eight of which are arranged versions of the original sound. The disc was published by Square and was only available initially to those who pre-ordered Secret of Evermore.

== Reception ==
Reception

Aggregate score
Aggregator	Score
GameRankings	81%

Review scores
Publication	Score
AllGame	4/5
Electronic Gaming Monthly	33.5 out of 40
EP Daily	8 out of 10
Game Players	88 out of 100
GameFan	246 out of 300
GamePro	3.625 out of 5
M! Games	79 out of 100
Mega Fun	87 out of 100
Next Generation	4/5
Nintendo Life	8/10
Nintendo Power	3.8 out of 5
Super Play	81 out of 100
Video Games (DE)	85 out of 100
Nintendo Acción	93 out of 100

Secret of Evermore received positive reviews from most media outlets. They praised its graphics. Scary Larry of GamePro, however, found the spell animations weak compared to those of other Square games, and said the bosses are large but strangely unimpressive. A highlight for some critics was gameplay, particularly the unique alchemy system and aspects also found in Secret of Mana such as the ring menu. Others found the mechanics needlessly hard to get used to. Nintendo Power praised the game for its graphics, sound, play control, story, and variety but criticized it for its awkward battle system and simple A.I. Although the quality of the musical compositions and sound effects were praised, Scary Larry complained of the player character's dog barking "constantly".

Super Play and GamePro both felt the game was not up to the standards of other Square games. Victor Lucas of Electric Playground praised the game saying that while it did not reach the heights of Chrono Trigger or Final Fantasy VI, it was still a highly enjoyable experience. Mega Fun argued it was on par with those games, with graphics that were nearly as good. Others argued that Secret of Evermore was a decent first attempt by the American team. Game Players anticipated another game from the same development team, and a critic for Next Generation said that while the game suffered from a number of amateur mistakes, "as a debut title for a new team of designers, it points to a rosy future". Video Games praised Squaresoft USA's very first title, noting that while the menu and control schemes were taken from previous Square games, its mood, story, and setting were enough to set it apart from the earlier titles.

In a retrospective review, Allgame editor Scott Alan Marriott described the game as "a good, solid RPG, but those expecting memorable characters or a dramatic, involving story will most likely be disappointed".

Three reviewers from GameFan praised the game. Two were skeptical that an American made role playing game could match Square's internally produced titles such as Final Fantasy, but they were impressed with the game. One reviewer, however, noted that he missed the Japanese-style art found in other Square games and although the art in Secret of Evermore was good, it was aimed at an American audience. In 2018, Complex rated Secret of Evermore 41st in their "The Best Super Nintendo Games of All Times" list.

== Sources ==
- Square Soft (1995). Secret of Evermore Instruction Manual (d=U/SNS-AEOE-USA) (PDF). Square Soft. Archived (PDF) from the original on 2019-07-26.
- Authorized Secret of Evermore Strategy Guide. BradyGames. 1995. ISBN 1566863287.
