= Trials of Mana (2020 video game) =

2020 video game

- Developer: Xeen
- Publisher: Square Enix
- Director: Naoki Matsue
- Producer: Shinichi Tatsuke
- Artist: Haccan
- Composer: Hiroki Kikuta
- Series: Mana
- Engine: Unreal Engine 4
- Platforms: Nintendo Switch; PlayStation 4; Windows; Android; iOS; Xbox Series X/S
- Release: Nintendo Switch, PlayStation 4, Windows; April 24, 2020; Android, iOS; July 15, 2021; Xbox Series X/S; September 26, 2024
- Genre: Action role-playing
- Mode: Single-player

Trials of Mana (Note: Known in Japan as Seiken Densetsu 3: Trials of Mana (Japanese: 聖剣伝説3 TRIALS of MANA; lit. The Legend of the Sacred Sword 3: Trials of Mana)) is a 2020 action role-playing game developed by Xeen and published by Square Enix for Nintendo Switch, PlayStation 4 and Windows. A mobile port released the following year. An Xbox Series X/S port released in 2024. It is a 3D remake of the 1995 Super Famicom title of the same name, the third game in the Mana series. (Note: The original game was known prior to 2019 by its native title Seiken Densetsu 3.) The story follows six possible protagonists in their respective quests, which lead them to obtain the Mana Sword and fight a world-ending threat. In gameplay, the player controls three out of six characters, navigating field environments, fighting enemies in real-time combat, and making use of character classes. New to the gameplay and storyline is a post-game chapter with an unlockable class.

The remake was conceived in 2017, during production of a remake for Secret of Mana (1993). Production of Trials of Mana was spurred on by Western demand, as the original game had not been localized. Originally a near-direct remake with plans for multiplayer as in the original, the team instead went for a 3D single-player experience which tweaked some aspects and added content while remaining faithful overall. The soundtrack by Hiroki Kikuta was arranged by a large team, with Kikuta supervising.

The remake was announced at E3 2019, with the localization requiring simultaneous translation into eight languages. Reception of the game on release was generally positive, with praise going to its redesigned combat and soundtrack, though many faulted its English dub and archaic elements. After release in April 2020, it sold beyond Square Enix's expectations, selling over one million copies worldwide by February 2021.

== Gameplay and plot ==
While carrying over the basic gameplay and premise, the Trials of Mana remake (below) adds several elements unseen in the original (above); these include 3D graphics, camera control, and new gameplay mechanics.

Trials of Mana is an action role-playing game in which the player controls a selection of three out of six protagonists, the first considered the primary character and the other two functioning as companions; while each begins with their own narrative, they are drawn into a single quest to defeat the Benevodons and save the Mana Tree. The game is a 3D remake of the 1995 Super Famicom title of the same name. The overall narrative and basic gameplay principles remain the same, but redesigned for a navigable 3D overworld. During exploration, the player can meet with other playable characters both before their recruitment and in various locations if they remain outside the party. Upon meeting a selected playable character, the player has the option of either viewing an explanatory cutscene, or playing through that character's prologue.

The chosen player characters navigate the overworld—split between town and country environments—and fight enemies in real-time combat. During exploration, the player can find items, treasure chests and hidden areas; a common reward is lucre, the in-game currency. The party fights using light and heavy melee attacks when within range, character-specific special skills unlocked through a distinct levelling system, tiered character class skills, and combined attacks between all three characters. Fighting enemies is rewarded with experience points, which raise a character's health (HP) and magic (MP). It also earns Training Points, which are fed into specific attributes to unlock new skills. A new addition is the "Ability" system. Abilities are moves and passive buffs which can be unlocked through the Training system. Chain Abilities are passive abilities which can be used by any character once unlocked, while attack-based Class Abilities are automatically unlocked and applied upon changing class.

During the game, the player finds various items, ranging from healing items to money and items that impact player or enemy statistics. Also found are Item Seeds, which can be planted in special pots in towns. There are different classes of Item Seed which produce better quality items, and a "Planter Level" which impacts the frequency of Item Seed drops and the quality of items. Within the environment, a recurring series character called Li’l Cactus is hidden, with finding them in each location granting rewards to the party. Once the main story is completed, a post-game storyline with its own class is unlocked, and after this is completed players can select New Game+ to carry over their character level, common items, and some collectables into a new campaign.

== Development ==
When originally released, the Super Famicom version of Trials of Mana was not localized outside of Japan, where it was released as Seiken Densetsu 3. Over the years, particularly following the 2017 release of the Collection of Mana compilation of the first three Mana titles in Japan, demand for a Western version increased. During production of the 3D remake of Secret of Mana, series producer Masaru Oyamada decided with the remake's producer Shinichi Tatsuki to bring the game overseas as a remake. Production began in 2017. While the remake for Secret of Mana was fairly faithful to the original, Trials of Mana was designed to be more like a new game due to its previous lack of localization. The remake was primarily developed by Xeen, who had worked with Square Enix in a supplementary role on Final Fantasy XV. Production was supervised by the Mana series staff at Square Enix. A large part of creating the remake was capturing the nostalgia of the original while innovating and adapting to the new design. The game was built using Unreal Engine 4. The English title was decided in consultation with series creator Koichi Ishii; the title both referred to the trials of the protagonists, and the letters "tri" standing for the number 3.

When designing Trials of Mana, the team took fan feedback from the Secret of Mana remake into account. They approached development as if it were a new game. An early prototype of the game was more faithful to the original, featuring a top-down view of environments. Dissatisfied with this, the team opted to redesign the game completely. The battle system was recreated in basics, but the team added new elements such as strong and weak attacks, combos, jumping and dodging, the ability to change weapons, and other elements such as the class system. The prototype battle system was similarly more faithful to the original, but "felt off" in practise. The game's AI system was redesigned compared to the original, which received criticism. While principally in 3D, the team included side-scrolling sections in homage to similar scenes in the original game. Multiplayer, a feature from the original game, was considered for inclusion in the remake. After going through several concepts that incorporated online multiplayer, the team realised they were pulling the project in too many directions. Aiming to make a polished single-player experience, the team discarded their multiplayer plans.

The basic narrative remained the same, new interactions between characters and other elements were introduced to flesh out the narrative. A key goal was fleshing out the protagonists. While the original script was fairly simple and featured sudden jumps in emotional mood, the revised script for the remake introduced more nuances into dialogue. An important element the team had to check was the voice actors. Several checks were made both to the scripts and during the recording process so the performances would not be out of character. The characters were redesigned by artist Haccan, who had acted as character designer for the Secret of Mana remake. Haccan adapted the original designs by Ishii and Nobuteru Yūki, reworking the designs for modern graphics with input from Ishii. The character models were created with the aim of directly translating Haccan's artwork into the game. While the original game used pixel art and allowed for exaggerated expressions using large heads on smaller bodies, the team were uncomfortable replicating it in full 3D and so expressions and interactions had to be completely redone. The character classes were redesigned using the original pixel art as a base, with the colours adjusted to better fit the personalities of the different protagonists.

The soundtrack, composed originally by Hiroki Kikuta, was arranged by Tsuyoshi Sekito, Koji Yamaoka, Ryo Yamazaki, and Sachiko Miyano. Kikuta acted as a supervisor for arrangements, and the original versions of tracks were included as an option for players. A few tracks were recorded with a full orchestra, but most used synthesised instruments. An official soundtrack album was released in Japan on April 22, 2020. The physical version was delayed to June 3 due to the COVID-19 pandemic.

== Release ==
The remake of Trials of Mana was announced in June 2019 at that year's E3 for Nintendo Switch, PlayStation 4 and Windows (via Steam). The game was released worldwide on April 24, 2020. The localization was a challenge for the team, as it required a simultaneous release in eight languages. A game demo was released across all platforms on March 18, 2020. The demo covers the opening section of the game, where the player chooses their characters and reaches the first boss fight, and allows players to transfer save data into the full game. The original Trials of Mana had received a fan translation prior to the remake's development, and the team aimed to both acknowledge and surpass their efforts. In October of that year, a patch was released which included bug fixes and adjustments, new harder difficulty levels, and a level reset option for New Game+. A port to Android and iOS mobile devices was announced in June 2021 during the 30th Anniversary livestream for the Mana series. It includes all the content of the post-patch home console versions, and pre-purchase bonuses that increase experience points and money drops up to Level 17. It was released worldwide on July 15 as a premium app. The game was later ported to Xbox Series X|S and Windows (via the Xbox App) on September 26, 2024. The Windows version later released on GOG.com on May 26, 2026.

== Reception ==
Reception

Aggregate score
| Aggregator | Score |
|---|---|
| Metacritic | NS: 74/100; PC: 78/100; PS4: 76/100 |

Review scores
| Publication | Score |
|---|---|
| Famitsu | 32/40 |
| Game Informer | 7.75/10 |
| GameSpot | 6/10 |
| IGN | 8/10 |
| Nintendo World Report | 8.5/10 |
| RPGamer | 4/5 |
| RPGFan | 88% |

The PlayStation 4 version of Trials of Mana was the second-best-selling retail game during its week of release in Japan, selling 80,383 copies. The Switch version came in third place with 70,114 copies sold. In their quarterly fiscal briefing following the game's release, Square Enix said the remake had sold far beyond expectations, contributing to sales growth during the period. By February 2021, the game had sold over one million copies worldwide. On review aggregate website Metacritic, the PC and PS4 versions were well received, while the Switch version saw mixed reviews.

Japanese magazine Famitsu noted the story's faithfulness to the original, with one reviewer calling the multiple protagonist routes "charming". Kimberley Wallace of Game Informer enjoyed how character stories could intersect, but felt the script was too stilted and cliche due to its faithfulness. GameSpot's Steve Watts enjoyed the "joyful moments of whimsy and weirdness" common to the Mana series, but generally disliked the tone and style of the narrative and faulted its fragmented structure. Seth Macy of IGN had little to say on the story, only noting its highly traditional style. Jordan Rudek of Nintendo World Report felt that the story lacked substance for repeated playthroughs, and RPGamer's Jervon Perkins called it "very traditional" in its delivery and style. Greg Delmage of RPGFan felt the remake was superior in how it portrayed the cast due to its use of voice acting and 3D camera presentation.

Famitsu praised the graphical overhaul, but noted little structural difference from the original. Wallace noted poor AI behavior and technical issues, but generally praised its presentation as a great improvement over the Secret of Mana remake. Macy enjoyed the graphical style, but noted severe frame rate drops on the Switch version. Perkins praised the "shiny, colorful picture book aesthetic", but noted some technical issues with pop-in graphics on PS4. Rudek also noted pop-in, but generally praised the Switch version in both TV and handheld modes. Delmage enjoyed the art style and lauded the reworked score, but felt the limited animations hurt dialogue delivery in cutscenes. The musical score received general praise for its remix of the original tracks, while the English dub was panned as weak at best and poorly directed at worst.

Famitsu generally praised the battle system and boss encounters, but there were mixed opinions on the design of combat and one reviewer found exploring the map dull due to a lack of interesting finds. Wallace found the experience enjoyable despite needing to grind for levels, while Rudek faulted the lack of side content despite engaging battles and customisation. Watts enjoyed the battle system, but found its Class system conditions obtuse and noted several elements such as Elemental affinities tied to particular days as going entirely wasted. Macy lauded the redesigned battle and leveling systems. Perkins found battles engaging, but felt the AI was lackluster. Delmage was positive overall about the battle system and exploration, but found the Class change system more awkward than the original version. Some reviewers negatively cited its linear structure, and both Macy and Famitsu faulted its camera control during battle. The boss battles also met with general praise. Macy and Perkins cited the new post-game content as an enjoyable addition.
