= Battle Royal High School =

Japanese manga

- Majinden
- Cover of the first manga volume

魔神伝
- Manga
- Written by: Shin'ichi Kuruma
- Published by: Tokuma Shoten
- Magazine: Monthly Shōnen Captain
- Original run: May 18, 1986 – August 18, 1989
- Volumes: 4
- Original video animation

Battle Royal High School
- Directed by: Ichirō Itano
- Produced by: Makoto Sakamoto; Kenji Miyashita
- Written by: Ichirō Itano
- Music by: Shirō Sagisu
- Studio: D.A.S.T.
- Licensed by: NA: AnimEigo
- Released: December 10, 1987
- Runtime: 60 minutes
- icon

Majinden (Japanese: 魔神伝; lit. "Legend of the Demons") is a Japanese manga written and illustrated by Shin'ichi Kuruma. It was serialized in the Tokuma Shoten magazine Monthly Shōnen Captain infrequently between the May 1986 and August 1989 issues. Originally released in four tankōbon (bound volumes), Majinden was later re-released in two larger volumes on December 20, 2008.

The manga was adapted into a single-episode anime titled Battle Royal High School (バトルロイヤルハイスクール, Batoru Roiyaru Haisukūru) released direct-to-video on December 10, 1987. It was directed by Ichirō Itano, and features character designs by Nobuteru Yūki and a musical score by Shirō Sagisu. The anime is considerably condensed when compared to its manga source material, making many characters seem out of place. The OVA was localized in English and released in North America by AnimEigo on VHS July 31, 1996, and on DVD September 23, 2003. The anime has been out-of-print in the region since 2011.

== Plot ==
Riki Hyōdo is a high school karate prodigy who enjoys fighting challenges. At the same time, unbeknownst to him, he is the prophesied vessel of Lord Byōdo, demon king of the Dark Realm, who learns his dark energy is empowering Hyōdo through a dimensional gate to produce a legendary warrior. Wanting to investigate this, Byōdo travels to Earth and supernaturally freezes the school to challenge Hyōdo. The boy defeats the demon's spirits, but is easily submitted himself by Byōdo, who reveals they are both the same being and, suspecting the prophecy to be a trap, fuses them together in Hyōdo's body to absorb his power. Hyōdo believes the whole ordeal to be just a dream.

Shortly after, Space-Time Continuum Inspector Zankan arrives to Earth after detecting demonic activity, and he witnesses a young man with spiritual powers, Toshimitsu Yūki, fighting and destroying man-possessing monsters. Next day, Yūki ambushes Hyōdo, feeling the dark energy inside him and wrongly believing him to be the master of the demons, and it takes Byōdo's power to stop him. Byōdo has deduced the culprit is his own demon lieutenant, Fairy Master Kain, who has secretly betrayed him, and proposes Yūki to team up in order to defeat her and her servants. Meanwhile, Kain deceives Megumi Koyama, a girl with an unrequited love for Hyōdo, and uses her emotions to create a demon and attack Hyōdo's close friend Ryōko Takayanagi. Zankan saves Takayanagi and interrogates her about Hyōdo, after which the latter uses his power to make her forget the encounter.

Zankan meets Hyōdo and allies temporally with him after a friendly spar, while Kain visits Yūki in his shrine and possesses him. During a school event, Hyōdo saves Megumi from demon-possessed students, but she is also infected by a demon and he is forced spend a lot of energy to destroy and resurrect her. At the same time, Zankan is attacked by Yūki-Kain, who defeats him and is about to kill him before Hyōdo intervenes. Hyōdo and Kain face off, wrecking the school in the process, and although Kain has the upper hand, Byōdo manages to take over momentarily and destroy her. After the battle, with Zankan's memory of the events erased, everything returns to normal.

== Credits ==
Cast
Character	Japanese	English
Riki Hyōdo	Kazuki Yao	Michael Granberry
Byōdo	Kazuki Yao	Michael Granberry
Toshihiro Yūki	Kazuhiko Inoue	Michael Granberry (as G. Briahn Realmercy)
Zankan	Hideyuki Tanaka	Paul Sincoff
Youko Takayanagi	Sakiko Tamagawa	Susan Grillo
Megumi Koyama	Chieko Hondo	Kristen Graf
Fairy Master Kain	Mari Yokoo	Hadley Eure
Baba	Shin Aomori	Pierre Brulatour
Nakano	Emi Shinohara	Shelby Reynolds
Mr. Toyokura	Hideyuki Umezu	Patt Noday
Byōdo's Servant	Daisuke Gōri	Eric Paisley
Sandy	Michie Tomizawa	Korbi Dean (as Deann Korbutt)
Sakamoto	Tomohiro Nishimura	
Junko	Yoshino Takamori	
Misaka	Satoru Inagaki	
Tōru	Junji Kitajima	
Suguru	Hiroki Nakamura	
Fairy	Natsumi Sasaki	

=== Additional voices ===
- English: J. David Arnold, Scott Simpson, Ralph Brownewell, Noah Shane

=== Crew ===
- Producers: Seiichi Sakamoto (Tokuma Japan) and Kenji Miyashita (D.A.S.T.)
- Director: Ichirō Itano
- Original Story, Screenplay, Storyboards: Ichirō Itano
- Music: Shirō Sagisu
- Character Design, Animation Direction: Nobuteru Yūki
- Assistant Animation Directors: Satoshi Urushihara, Hiromi Niioka, Hiroaki Ōgami, Hideaki Anno

=== Ending Theme: "Medusa" ===
- Lyrics: Yūri Sugimoto
- Music: Tak Matsumoto
- Arrangement: Tetsurō Oda and Takahiro Matsumoto By Tokuma Japan Communications

== Reception ==
The OVA received mixed reviews from anime critics. Reviewers at The Fandom Post noted that the audio presentation was decent, with clean dialogue throughout, while the video transfer preserved the original full-frame format of the 1987 production. Critics generally acknowledged that the OVA attempted to pack too much plot into its 60-minute runtime, with one IMDB reviewer noting that the anime throws plot developments one after another without establishing the previous one, while jumping between humour, ancient prophecy, and ultra-violence. Despite its convoluted story, reviewers noted that the fight sequences and animation were competent for an OVA of its era, with well-animated fight scenes and detailed gore sequences.
