= Trials of Mana =

1995 video game

- Box art
- Developer: Square
- Publisher: Square
- Director: Hiromichi Tanaka
- Producer: Tetsuhisa Tsuruzono
- Designer: Koichi Ishii
- Artists: Koichi Ishii; Nobuteru Yūki; Hiroo Isono
- Composer: Hiroki Kikuta
- Series: Mana
- Platforms: Super Famicom, Nintendo Switch
- Release: Super Famicom: JP: September 30, 1995; Nintendo Switch (Collection of Mana): JP: June 1, 2017; WW: June 11, 2019
- Genre: Action role-playing
- Modes: Single-player, multiplayer

Trials of Mana, also known by its Japanese title Seiken Densetsu 3, (Note: Japanese: 聖剣伝説3; lit. The Legend of the Sacred Sword 3) is a 1995 action role-playing game developed and published by Square for the Super Famicom. It is the sequel to the 1993 game Secret of Mana, and is the third installment in the Mana series. Set in a high fantasy world, the game follows three heroes as they attempt to claim the legendary Mana Sword and prevent the Benevodons from being unleashed and destroying the world. It features three main plotlines and six different possible main characters, each with their own storylines, and allows two players to play simultaneously. Trials of Mana builds on the gameplay of its predecessor with multiple enhancements, including the use of a time progression system with transitions from day to night and weekday to weekday in game time, and a wide range of character classes to choose from, which provides each character with an exclusive set of skills and status progression.

The game was designed by series creator Koichi Ishii, directed by veteran Square designer Hiromichi Tanaka, and produced by Tetsuhisa Tsuruzono. Artwork was produced by manga and anime artist Nobuteru Yūki, while the music was composed by Secret of Mana composer Hiroki Kikuta. Although the game was only released in Japan at the time, English-speaking players had been able to play Trials of Mana due to an unofficial English fan translation released in 1999.

Trials of Mana received critical acclaim from reviewers, who praised the graphics as among the best ever made for the Super Famicom and the gameplay as an improved version of its predecessor's. The plot received mixed reviews by critics, who found the overlapping stories to be interesting and to enhance replayability, but the characters and plotlines themselves to be flat and clichéd. Overall, the game is considered by some critics to be a Super Famicom classic.

In June 2017, the game was included in the Seiken Densetsu Collection release for the Nintendo Switch in Japan; the collection was released in June 2019 in North America and the PAL region as Collection of Mana with Seiken Densetsu 3 titled Trials of Mana. A 3D remake of the same name was announced alongside it, and released worldwide in April 2020 for Microsoft Windows, Nintendo Switch and PlayStation 4. The remake was released for Xbox Series X/S in 2024.

== Gameplay ==
Angela, Duran, and Riesz fighting Land Umber, the Earth Benevodon

Trials of Mana has similar gameplay to its predecessor, Secret of Mana. Like many other role-playing games of the 16-bit era, the game displays a top-down perspective, in which the three player characters navigate the terrain and fight off hostile creatures. Control may be passed between each of the characters at any time; the companions not currently selected are controlled by artificial intelligence. The game may be played simultaneously by two players, as opposed to the three of Secret of Mana. There are six possible player characters. At the beginning of the game, the player chooses which three of them will be playable and which one they will start with; the other two playable characters will join the party when met. The remaining three characters act as non-playable characters (NPCs) when encountered.

Each character can use one type of weapon, in addition to magical spells. The effectiveness of spells depends on the magical ability of the character and the element of the spell in relation to the enemy. When in battle mode, attacking monsters fills a gauge that allows the player to use character-specific special attacks. Upon collecting enough experience points in battle, each character can increase in level to gain improved character statistics such as strength and evasion. Options such as changing equipment, casting spells, or checking status are performed by cycling through the game's Ring Commands—a circular menu which hovers over the controlled party member. The game is paused whenever the Ring Command menu is activated. Within the Ring, the player has nine slots for storing items; additional items can be placed into item storage, which is inaccessible in combat.

Character level progression is coordinated by the player, as a choice is given as to which statistic to raise by a point at every level up. A "class" system is also present. Once a character reaches level 18, the player can visit one of several Mana Stones located throughout the game and choose to upgrade them to one of two classes for each character—either a class aligned to "Light" or a class aligned to "Dark"—which provides a different set of skills and different improvements to character statistics. A second class change may be optionally performed at level 38, again split between a light and a dark choice, if the player has obtained a required rare item for the target class. The class changes do not affect the plot of the game, only gameplay.

Trials of Mana also employs a calendar function into its gameplay. A week cycles much more quickly than an actual one, with a day passing in a matter of minutes. Each day of the week is represented by a different elemental spirit. On that spirit's day, magic of that element will be slightly stronger. An in-game day is also divided into day and night. Certain events only happen during certain times of day, such as a nighttime-only black market selling particularly rare items. Enemies encountered in the field also change during certain time periods, and some may be sleeping if the characters approach them at night. In addition, the character Kevin transforms into a werewolf when he fights at night, greatly increasing his attack power. Using an inn's services allows the player to "skip" the game's clock to that day's evening, or the following morning.

== Story ==
=== Setting ===
The story takes place in a fictional world where Mana represents an ethereal, but finite, energy source. Some time in the past, the Mana Goddess created the game's world by forging the powerful Sword of Mana and defeating eight monsters of destruction, the Benevodons—"God Beasts" in earlier translations—with it, sealing them within eight Mana Stones, before turning herself into the Mana Tree and falling asleep. The game is set at a time when Mana starts to fade and peace has ended, as several people plot to unleash the Benevodons from the stones so as to gain ultimate power. The game is not a direct sequel to the events in Secret of Mana; according to series creator Koichi Ishii in 2006, the Mana games do not take place in exactly the same world, and characters or elements that appear in different games are best considered alternate versions of each other. Instead, the connections between each title are more abstract than story-based. Despite this statement, the 2007 game Heroes of Mana is a direct prequel to Trials of Mana, taking place 19 years before the latter's story.

=== Characters ===
The characters (and their individual stories) are grouped into three main sub-plots. Duran and Angela oppose the Crimson Wizard and the Dragon Lord, Hawkeye and Riesz oppose Belladonna and the Dark Majesty, Kevin and Charlotte oppose Goremand and the Masked Mage. (Note: Character names are taken from the official English release in the Collection of Mana, which differ from the Corlett fansub translation) The main storyline is determined by the first character chosen, though there is significantly more character interaction and dialogue if the other member of the pair is also in the party.

- Duran (Note: Japanese: デュラン, Hepburn: Dyuran) is an orphaned mercenary swordsman of Valsena, Kingdom of the Plains. His father, Loki the Golden Knight, was lost in battle with the Dragon Emperor, and his mother died of sickness soon after. One night, Duran is on guard duty at the castle of Valsena when the Crimson Wizard attacks the castle and murders several soldiers. Duran confronts him, only to be defeated easily and left for dead. After recovering, he vows to become the best swordsman in the world and to exact his revenge upon the Crimson Wizard.
- Angela (Note: Japanese: アンジェラ, Hepburn: Anjera) is the princess of the ice-covered Magic Kingdom of Altena, though she herself has little to no potential in magic unlike everyone else in the kingdom. Her mother, Queen Valda uses her magic to keep the citadel in Altena in a perpetual Spring, but the spell weakens as Mana starts to fade. To power the spell, she and her assistant the Crimson Wizard decide to invade other nations to claim their Mana Stones, though the spell to use the Stone is fatal to the caster. When the Queen tries to force Angela to use it after deeming her useless for her lack of magic, she flees from Altena and strives to become a powerful mage so that her mother would accept her again.
- Kevin (Note: Japanese: ケヴィン, Hepburn: Kevin) is the half-human prince of Ferolia. His father, Gauser the Beast King, is sick of the treatment of his people by "normal" humans. His desired revenge is made possible by the appearance of Goremand, who shows the king his abilities by forcing Kevin to awaken his werewolf abilities by killing Kevin's best friend. When Kevin confronts the Beast King on this act and the King's plans to invade the human Holy City Wendel, Kevin is thrown out of the kingdom and swears revenge. He also seeks to find a way to bring Karl back to life and learn the fate of his human mother.
- Charlotte (Note: Japanese: シャルロット, Hepburn: Sharurotto) is the half-elf granddaughter of the Priest of Light in Wendel. An orphan, she is looked after by a fellow cleric, Heath. Feeling an evil influence in nearby Jadd, the Priest of Light sends Heath to investigate, but Charlotte follows to witness Goremand abduct Heath, so she decides to go out on a journey to save him.
- Hawkeye (Note: Japanese: ホークアイ, Hepburn: Hōkuai) is a member of a guild of noble thieves based in the desert Sand Fortress of Nevarl. The guild's leader, Lord Flamekhan, suddenly and uncharacteristically declares Nevarl to be a kingdom. Hawkeye decides to confront Flamekhan about it, only to discover he is being controlled by the witch Isabella. Isabella kills Eagle, Flamekhan's son and Hawkeye's friend, framing Hawkeye for his death and forcing him to flee.
- Riesz (Note: Japanese: リース, Hepburn: Rīsu) is the princess of the mountainous Wind Kingdom of Laurent and captain of its Amazon army. Two mysterious ninjas from Nevarl trick her younger brother Elliott into turning off Laurent's protective winds and kidnap him. With the winds gone, Nevarl attacks Laurent with a cloud of sleep powder and kills its king. Devastated, Riesz makes her escape and seeks out to find her lost brother.

=== Plot ===
The story begins in a different place for each playable character. With the exception of Charlotte, the main character is soon told (or otherwise decides) to seek the advice of the Priest of Light in the Holy City Wendel. They arrive at the city of Jadd soon after the Beastmen have invaded. Due to the Beastmen's werewolf powers, they are able to make an escape by night. The main character—now including Charlotte—on the way to Wendel stays overnight in Astoria where they are woken by a bright light. Following it, it reveals itself to be a Faerie from the Sanctuary of Mana, exhausted by her journey. Out of desperation, the Faerie chooses the main character to be her host and tells them to get to Wendel. There, while they explain their grievances to the Priest of Light, the Faerie interrupts and explains that the Mana Tree is dying, and that the Sanctuary is in danger. The Priest explains that if the Tree dies, the Benevodons will reawaken and destroy the world. He goes on to explain further that, because the Faerie has chosen the main character as its host, they must travel to the Sanctuary to draw the Sword of Mana from the foot of the Mana Tree. They can then restore peace to the world, and have their wishes granted by the Mana Goddess if the sword is drawn before the Tree dies. A great deal of power is needed to open the gate to the Sanctuary. The Faerie does not have the strength to do it, and the ancient spell which would do so by unlocking the power in the Mana Stones also takes the caster's life. The Stones' guarding elemental spirits, however, will to be able to open the gate if their powers are combined.

After journeying across the world to get the spirits, meeting the other two members of the party, thwarting the invasion attempts of Nevarl and Altena, discovering the powers of the Fire and Water Mana Stones, and learning the disappearance of the Mana Stone of Darkness along the way, the main character tries to open the gate to the Sanctuary of Mana with the spirits' assistance. The first attempt fails, but the second succeeds; the Faerie realizes that it was opened because someone else released the power from all the Mana Stones. The characters travel into the Sanctuary and the main character claims the Mana Sword. It is then discovered that the main character's adversaries—the Crimson Wizard and the Darkshine Knight for Angela and Duran; Malocchio and Isabella for Riesz and Hawkeye; or Goremand and a mind-controlled Heath, for Kevin and Charlotte—have defeated the other two sets of primary enemies. The remaining adversaries capture the Faerie and will only release her in exchange for the Mana Sword. The trade is made, and once the enemy receives the Sword, the Mana Stones shatter and the Benevodons are released.

The characters must then defeat the Benevodons before they can gather and destroy the world. However, after doing this they realize killing the Benevodons has given more power to their main enemy, for whom their own personal enemies were working for—the Dragon Lord for Duran and Angela, the Dark Majesty for Hawkeye and Riesz, and the Masked Mage for Kevin and Charlotte. The already powerful villain absorbs the power of the Sword of Mana and the Benevodons in order to become a god, but is halted by the Mana Goddess blocking some of its power. After defeating the villain's minions, the characters go and defeat their main enemy, but are unable to stop him from destroying the Mana Tree and eliminating all Mana from the world. The Faerie then fuses with what is left of the Mana Tree; she will be reborn as the Mana Goddess in a thousand years, but until then Mana will not exist in the world. As the game ends, the characters go back to their own homelands.

== Development ==
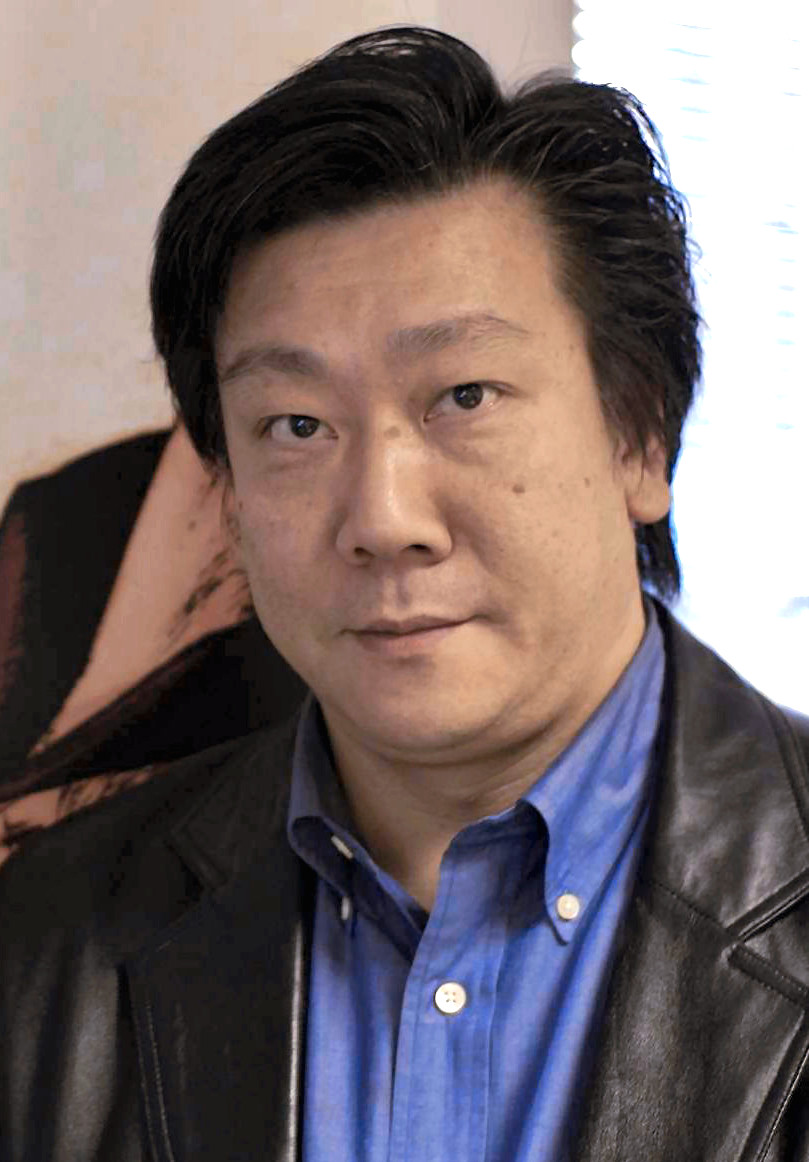
Game director Hiromichi Tanaka in 2007

Seiken Densetsu 3 was designed by series creator Koichi Ishii. The game was directed by Hiromichi Tanaka and produced by Tetsuhisa Tsuruzono. Tanaka had previously worked on several titles for Square, including as a designer on the first three Final Fantasy titles. Manga and anime artist Nobuteru Yūki was responsible for the character concept artwork, based on designs by Ishii. Production began in 1993, beginning with a lengthy period of trial-and-error where several prototype designs were created and scrapped. As the next generation of console hardware was close to release, the team were unable to "prolong" production or keep its existence quiet as they had done with Secret of Mana. The team also had difficulties keeping staff, as many were being brought into the teams of other Super Famicom titles such as Chrono Trigger and Romancing SaGa 3 to get them finished. Programmers in particular were in demand, and Tanaka remembered "fighting" with Hironobu Sakaguchi for staff. A downloadable demo saw a limited release on July 1, 1995, for the Super Famicom's Satellaview broadcast peripheral.

The original intent was for a "continuation" of Secret of Mana, but the team ultimately scrapped all they had produced for the previous game and built Trials of Mana from scratch to become a more action-oriented title. The team wanted to get as close as possible to 3D graphics, with the design and background teams working in tandem to create multiple graphical layers. Some cut content from Secret of Mana, particularly monster designs, was reused for Trials of Mana. The final product was very large, with the team pushing the Super Famicom cartridge to capacity. A part cut from Trials of Mana before release was the end boss in the volcano dungeon; while planned from the outset, the team were short on time and so had to drop it.

The theme of the game is "independence". Ishii explained this as meaning he wanted the characters to have a sense of camaraderie through sharing each other's problems. The story kept a light tone, mostly due to Tanaka's insistence and Yūki's artwork. Each character was designed around both gameplay and narrative archetypes, providing players with variety and having quirks related to how they were raised. Duran was portrayed as a typical serious heroic figure, with Hawkeye being his direct opposite. Kevin was included as the team wanted a transforming character. Charlotte was compared to Popoi from Secret of Mana, as she had a cheerful demeanour despite a dark past. Angela appears selfish and brash due to the neglect from her mother, while Riesz's narrative focuses on her "brother complex" due to losing her own mother at a young age. The artwork was designed to emulate a picture book more than anything realistic, emphasised with the use of soft colors. Much of the basic narrative was conceived by Tanaka, though due to hardware limitations and production time, the amount of variation between individual storylines was limited.

=== Localization ===
During the game's development and after its release in Japan on September 30, 1995, Seiken Densetsu 3 became known abroad as Secret of Mana 2, though a preview in Next Generation in August 1995 called it by its original name, despite still stating it to be a sequel to Secret of Mana. The preview noted the six characters, calendar system, and a game world "three to four times" the size of the previous game, though it also reported that the game would be playable by three players, not two. Square stated in a 1995 issue of its North American newsletter that they planned to release the game during the second half of the year. A second preview in Next Generation in February 1996, calling the game Secret of Mana 2, stated that the game's North American release had been canceled by Square's American branch due to programming bugs that they deemed impossible to fix in a timely manner.

Before 2019, Seiken Densetsu 3 was not released outside Japan. Retro Gamer stated in 2011 that localizing the game for North America or Europe "would have cost a fortune", and that the rise of the competing PlayStation and Sega Saturn consoles diminished the benefits of spending so much on a Super Nintendo Entertainment System (SNES) game. Another proposed reason was lackluster sales of Secret of Mana overseas. Nintendo Power, a few months after Seiken Densetsu 3 was released in Japan, said that the probability of a North American release for the game was low due to issues of "a technical nature" and that it would have been far too costly to produce at the time. This is further supported by Brian Fehdrau, lead programmer for Square's contemporary game Secret of Evermore, who mentioned that Seiken Densetsu 3 had some software bugs, hindering its likelihood of being certified for release by Nintendo of America without extensive work. In 2020, series producer Masaru Oyamada revealed that the size of the game meant there was no spare capacity on the cartridge for localization data.

There was an apparent misconception among video game fans that the SNES title Secret of Evermore was released in lieu of an English language version of Seiken Densetsu 3 in 1995. Secret of Evermore was developed by a new team at Square's office in Redmond, Washington called Square Soft. According to Fehdrau, no one who worked on the Evermore project would have been involved in a translation of Seiken Densetsu 3; the Redmond team was specifically hired to create Evermore. In 1999, a fan translation project for Seiken Densetsu 3 led by Neill Corlett was successfully completed and made available on the internet as an unofficial patch, which could be applied to ROMs of the game when played with an emulator or played on a Super NES console with a development kit or backup device.

Following the Japanese release of the Seiken Densetsu Collection, a compilation of the first three games of the Mana series, for the Nintendo Switch on June 1, 2017, staff at Square Enix became aware of overseas interest for the compilation. During the development for the upcoming remake, members of Square Enix's Western teams suggested that the original title be made available as well. In order to localize the game, a revisiting of the original development environment for the Super Nintendo Entertainment System was done, which required assistance from Nintendo. There was little trouble with localizing the title due to the expanded storage capacities of the Switch. Work on localizing the game to English and other European languages took about a year. Ishii requested that the title include a word with the number "3" in it for the remake. Square Enix decided on "Trials of Mana" because it referred to the trials of the protagonists, only three of six characters could be selected evolving into "triangle stories", and it included the prefix "tri" bearing the number "3" in accordance with Ishii's wishes. The localized game, now titled Trials of Mana, was finally brought overseas as part of the Collection of Mana, which was released on June 11, 2019, in North America and the PAL region.

=== Music ===
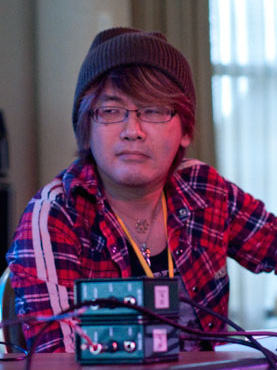
Composer Hiroki Kikuta in 2011

Seiken Densetsu 3 Original Sound Version

Soundtrack album by Hiroki Kikuta
- Released: 1995
- Genre: Video game soundtrack
- Length: 3:19:21
- Label: NTT Publishing/Square

The score for Seiken Densetsu 3 was composed by Hiroki Kikuta, who had previously composed the music for Secret of Mana as his first video game score. Kikuta performed the sound selection, editing, effect design, and data encoding himself. Just as he did for Secret of Mana, Kikuta spent nearly 24 hours a day in his office, alternating between composing and editing to create a soundtrack that would be, according to him, "immersive" and "three-dimensional". Similarly, rather than use premade MIDI samples of instruments like most game music composers of the time, Kikuta made his own MIDI samples that matched the hardware capabilities of the Super Famicom so that he would know exactly how the pieces would sound on the system's hardware instead of having to deal with audio hardware differences between the original MIDI sampler and the SNES. The soundtrack's music has been described by Freddie W. of RPGFan as "bouncy, energetic, flowing, and serene", and is noted for its use of piano and drums. He further called it a "more refined and matured" version of the Secret of Mana soundtrack.

The 1995 soundtrack album Seiken Densetsu 3 Original Sound Version collects 60 tracks of music from Seiken Densetsu 3. It was published by NTT Publishing, and republished by Square Enix in 2004. The main theme from Secret of Mana, "Angel's Fear", is also featured in Seiken Densetsu 3 as a part of "Where Angels Fear to Tread". In addition to the original soundtrack album, an arranged album of music from Secret of Mana and Seiken Densetsu 3 was produced in 1993 as Secret of Mana+. The music in the album was all composed and arranged by Kikuta. Secret of Mana+ contains a single track, titled "Secret of Mana", that incorporates themes from the music of both Secret of Mana and Seiken Densetsu 3, which was still under development at the time. The style of the album has been described by critics as "experimental", using "strange sounds" such as waterfalls, bird calls, cell phone sounds, and "typing" sounds. Secret of Mana+ was originally published by NTT Publishing/Square, and was reprinted by NTT Publishing in 1995 and 2004.

The track "Meridian Child" from the original soundtrack was performed by the Kanagawa Philharmonic Orchestra for the fifth Orchestral Game Concert in 1996. "Meridian Child" was again performed on February 6, 2011, when the Eminence Symphony Orchestra played a concert in Tokyo as part of the Game Music Laboratory concert series as a tribute to the music of Kenji Ito and Hiroki Kikuta. One of the companion books of sheet music for the Mana series, the first edition of Seiken Densetsu Best Collection Piano Solo Sheet Music, included pieces from Seiken Densetsu 3, rewritten by Asako Niwa as beginning to intermediate level piano solos, though intended to sound like the originals.

== Reception ==
Reception

Review scores
Publication	Score
1Up.com	B–
Famitsu	8/10, 8/10, 8/10, 7/10
GameFan	94/100, 95/100, 96/100
Jeuxvideo.com	17/20
Nintendo Life	9/10
RPGamer	8/10
Super Game Power	4.2/5
Cubed3	9/10

Due to its Japanese exclusivity at the time, most of the English-language reviews for Trials of Mana were published years after the initial release. One contemporary English-language review was in 1995 in GameFan, which covered import games and rated the game highly. The Japanese Famitsu review also rated the game highly, though slightly lower than Secret of Mana. The Brazilian SuperGamePower magazine also gave it a positive contemporary review, noting it as having some of the best graphics of any game on the SNES. Critics have also rated the game highly in retrospective reviews, published mostly after the release of the fan translation patch in 2000. The graphics were praised; a review from 1UP.com called the game "absolutely gorgeous", which they attributed to its position towards the end of the era of 2D SNES games, but before developers tried to start working with prerendered 3D graphics. A review by Chris Parsons of RPGamer agreed, terming the graphics "awesome" and positively comparing some of the effects to PlayStation RPGs, which the Cubed3 review by Adam Riley did as well. A preview by Next Generation written after the release of the game in Japan stated that the detailed graphics "puts just about every other recent 32-bit RPG to shame", while the review by Corbie Dillard of Nintendo Life also noted the game as one of the best graphically on the SNES and called out the unique visual styles of each area in the game as of particular note. The game's music was also generally praised; Nintendo Life's Dillard called it "spectacular from start to finish", while Cubed3's Riley said it was "one of the most sonically pleasing out of the whole SNES lifetime" and RPGamer's Parsons said that "a wonderful job was done in the composition of the music". The Next Generation preview praised both the quality of the soundtrack and the musical continuity from the Secret of Mana soundtrack.

The gameplay was highly rated by most reviewers, though the combat system had detractors. Dillard of Nintendo Life felt that the gameplay was as good as that of Secret of Mana and it had "a much more strategic feel to it". The 1UP.com and Cubed3 reviews also brought up the day and time system as interesting additions, though the 1UP.com reviewer felt that the combat was not "quite as tight" as in Secret of Mana. The Next Generation preview, while acknowledging that several flaws in the Secret of Mana combat system had been corrected and praising the boss battles, felt that the computer-controlled characters showed no sense of tactics, resulting in a free-for-all. A review by JeuxVideo.com also noted several improvements in the combat system over the prior game, but felt that battles could turn into a chaotic mass of attacks and numbers. Parsons of RPGamer also called out the Ring system as being flawed, as he found it frustrating that the menu could not be brought up while a character was performing an action, making boss battles hectic and difficult. The JeuxVideo.com reviewer also took issue with this restriction.

The plot received mixed reviews; while several reviewers praised the system of choosing different main characters, especially its effect on replayability, Cubed3's Riley felt that it meant that the story "can be quite confusing". Parsons noted that the interactions with the characters that were not chosen often left plot holes, as their motivations were not explained. The Famitsu review praised the replayability of the branching narrative. The Next Generation preview, while praising the multiple storylines as an innovation in the genre, felt that it had been attached to a "magic-and-monsters fantasy-formula" plot. The 1UP.com reviewer agreed, saying that the plot was not "too terribly engaging", suffering from clichés and flat characters.

Nintendo Life's Dillard stated that it was "easily one of the best RPGs to come out of the 16-bit era", while the 1UP.com reviewer said that if it had been officially translated into English it "very likely would have become a fondly remembered classic".

== Remake ==
A remake of the game, released under the official localized title, was announced at E3 2019 for a worldwide release for the PlayStation 4, Nintendo Switch, and Windows PC in early 2020. It was released worldwide on April 24 of that year, with a version for Xbox Series X/S released in 2024. Beginning production in 2017, the remake was produced with the aim of staying true to the original while reimagining it using 3D graphics and with an expanded, modernized gameplay system. The remake cut the multiplayer feature from the game.
