= Kevin (Trials of Mana) =

Trials of Mana protagonist

- Mana character
- Kevin in Trials of Mana (1995)
- First appearance: Trials of Mana (1995)
- Designed by: Koichi Ishii (concept); Nobuteru Yūki (final design); HACCAN (2020)

Kevin (Japanese: ケヴィン) is a character in the 1995 video game Trials of Mana. He is one of its six protagonists, able to be selected as either the main character or a supporting character to one of the others. He is the prince of the kingdom of Ferolia, leaving after learning the truth of his father's nature. He is connected to the character Charlotte, who was intended by the design team to have romantic elements featured with him, which were excluded due to a lack of room in the game. Her design was created by Nobuteru Yūki and Koichi Ishii, his design inspired by Goku from Dragon Ball.

== Appearances ==
Kevin appears in the video game Trials of Mana for the Super Famicom as one of its six protagonists, appearing alongside characters Duran, Hawkeye, Charlotte, and Riesz. Players are able to choose from one of these six characters as their main character; if Kevin is not chosen as the main character, he can instead be selected as one of the player's other two party members that can be encountered later on. If not selected as one of these three characters, he is not involved in the main story.

Kevin has appeared in other video games in playable and non-playable roles. He is a playable character in Circle of Mana, and he makes cameos in Final Fantasy Brave Exvius and Super Smash Bros. Ultimate.

== Concept and creation ==
Kevin was created for Trials of Mana, his design finalized by manga and anime artist Nobuteru Yūki based on concept art by Koichi Ishii. He was meant to evoke the idea of a "slightly evil version of Son Goku" from Dragon Ball, intentionally made to be the only dark-skinned character in the party. His design combines Arabian clothing and a tanran blazer, "that a young Japanese hooligan would wear." He wears a boa and zebra-stripe pants to convey his Beastman race. His hat was made to look like a Green Beret's. His design in the remake was created by the artist HACCAN. He was included in the game due to the team wanting a transforming character. He was intended to have romantic moments with another playable character, Charlotte, which ultimately had to be left out due to a lack of space. In the remake, scenes between Kevin and Charlotte were added.

== Reception ==
Kevin has received mixed reception. In an Inside Games poll, Kevin ranked fourth as the Trials of Mana character players picked as their main character, getting the same placement in a poll about which characters players picked as a supporting character. Kevin's skin color was the subject of commentary, with Arstechnica writer Jeffrey Rousseau arguing that Trials of Mana does a poor job depicting people of color via Kevin. He felt that Kevin being the only person of color in the team, in conjunction with his race being almost entirely dark-skinned and among the only dark-skinned characters in the game, when combined, reflected this poor depiction. He felt that Trials of Mana typically depicts dark skin as "scary and beast-like," noting how Kevin was the only Beastman who opposed the King's attempts to oppress humanity. He felt disappointed that the remake did not rectify these issues. Futabanet writer Yamaguchi Quest expressed that he had the most empathy for Kevin of the cast, particularly due to the fate that befalls him, as well as the life he led before the beginning of the game.

RPG Site writer George Foster considered Kevin to be his favorite character, considering him a standout of the game's plot. Despite this, he found Kevin's voice acting to be irritating, feeling that they should have done more than use the same intonation in his dialogue to convey his lack of familiarity with the language. USgamer writer Nadia Oxford enjoyed Kevin's character, finding the scene with him hurting the wolf pup and the general gameplay behind Kevin enjoyable. She also commented that she eventually came to like his dialogue. Commenting on Kevin's dialogue, RPGFan writer Greg Delmage found the execution in the Super NES version "okay at best," sounding awkward when spoken, especially thanks to "poor voice direction." RPGFan staff noted how powerful Kevin was, with writer Alana Hagues noting that he was "by far" the most powerful character in the Super NES version. In another podcast, RPGFan staff discussed the remake, commenting that Kevin's affectations translated poorly to voice acting, wishing that he would just lose it. RPGFan writer Michael Sollosi also found it odd that, aside from growling, other Beastmen had normal affectation, and that Kevin's growling made him sound constipated.
