= Angel Cop =

Japanese original video animation series

エンゼルコップ (Enzeru Koppu)
- Created by: Ichirō Itano
- Manga
- Written by: Taku Kitazaki
- Published by: Kadokawa Shoten
- Magazine: Newtype
- Original run: June 1989 – September 1989
- Volumes: 1
- Original video animation
- Directed by: Ichirō Itano
- Produced by: Kazufumi Nomura (eps. 1–3); Yoshio Nakamura (eps. 4–6)
- Written by: Shō Aikawa (eps. 1–3); Ichirō Itano (eps. 4–6)
- Music by: Hiroshi Ogasawara (Note: Also known by the stage names Kan Ogasawara and Utollo Teshikai.)
- Studio: D.A.S.T.; Studio 88 (eps. 1–3)
- Licensed by: NA: Manga Entertainment (former); Discotek Media (current)
- Released: September 1, 1989 – May 20, 1994
- Runtime: 25–37 minutes
- Episodes: 6
- icon

Angel Cop (エンゼルコップ, Enzeru Koppu) is a six-part original video animation created and directed by Ichirō Itano. A manga adaptation written and illustrated by Taku Kitazaki was serialized in Newtype in 1989 and collected into a Newtype 100% collection released in April 1990.

== Synopsis ==
The story initially starts by dealing with terrorism at the end of the 20th century, where Japan is the largest economy in the world. The communist radical group, the Red May, are working to bring down Japan's economy and take over the government. In response, a new state agency dubbed The Special Security Force is formed with the ability to act outside the law. However, when the Red May suddenly find themselves being wiped out, the force discovers that something else is hunting the terrorists.

== Characters ==
Yō "Angel" Mikawa
The main protagonist and title character. A member of the Special Security Force, she initially believes in just getting the job accomplished and not caring who dies. In the end, however, she shows dismay after being forced to kill Raiden. Her story differs in the manga; she becomes cybernetic after being injured in an explosion, in contrast to her anime counterpart who remains human throughout.
Isamu "Raiden" Sakada
Angel's assigned partner in the Special Security Force. Injured during a pursuit of the Red May terrorists, he voluntarily allows himself to receive cybernetic enhancements in the anime. His new powers allow him to fight Lucifer to a standstill. Afterward, he forces Angel to kill him by causing his suit to detonate, destroying Lucifer in the process. Raiden's story differs in the manga, where Angel becomes cybernetic instead of him.
Yuuji "Hacker" Fuse
One of the Special Security agents. As his name implies, he handles hacking duties, but also participates in firefights, being enormously strong and muscled. He is killed when Lucifer takes control of his body and causes him to detonate a grenade in the anime. In the manga, he is killed by Freya.
Reika "Peace" Yogawa
The only other female Special Security agent, Peace handles explosives and is generally paired with Hacker. It is later revealed that she is in love with him. Peace dies when Lucifer drains her mind in the anime. As with Hacker, she is killed by Freya in the manga.
Masumi "Kuwata" Hirakawa
Taki's right-hand man, Kuwata appears to be second in command of the Special Security Agency. He is killed by Lucifer for allowing Tachihara to leave the Special Security's building. He wanted an alliance with the hunters shortly before his death.
Chief Taki
The head of the Special Security Force, he is responsible for giving his subordinates their orders. In the final episode, he arrives at the main police office to kill Maisaka, but is wounded in the attempt and left to bleed to death; however, he manages to plant a bomb in a tape recorder and escape the building.
Ichihara
A scientist for the Ministry of Defense who developed cybernetic technology for the police force. Taki, however, refused to allow Ichihara to test his works on the Special Security agents; nevertheless, Ichihara was able to give Raiden a cybernetic exoskeleton. During the final battle, he was killed when his laboratory exploded by Lucifer's power.
Lucifer
The main antagonist, Lucifer is a Hunter, a psychic sent to destroy anyone unjust in the world. Of the three Hunters, Lucifer is the most powerful and the most fanatical, causing a mass pile-up just to catch Tachihara and killing anyone who attempts to aide the Red May terrorists, the Special Service agents included. Her powers are telekinesis and telepathy, and is able to increase her physical and psychic power by sucking electricity. She is finally killed when Raiden's suit detonates in front of her. In the manga, she is killed by a cybernetic Angel.
Asura
The first Hunter encountered, Asura possesses psychic powers of teleporting and telekinesis, though the latter not on the same level as Lucifer's. He decides to join up with the Special Security agents after realizing Lucifer went too far in her methods. Asura soon becomes targeted by her, but survives the final encounter. In the manga, Asura never allies himself with the Special Security agents and is shot in the head by Angel.
Freya
A young girl Hunter. She possesses pyrokinetic and telepathic powers, and is also capable to create a kinetic shield out of fire. Asura and Freya appear to be very close. She is killed by Lucifer in the anime and Angel in the manga.
Governor Maisaka
The main villain, Maisaka is the Governor of Tokyo, and he is in command of all the police forces. He is responsible for Red May, awakening the hunters, and attempting to wipe out the Special Security Force. He was killed when a bomb Taki planted inside his tape recorder detonated.
Chief Togawa
Tokyo Metropolitan Police Department Public Security Bureau Third Public Security Division Chief and Maisaka's second in command. Togawa was seemingly killed by Angel during an attack on Ichihara's building, but the man killed was revealed to be a decoy. The real Togawa perishes in the explosion that also kills Maisaka.
Tachihara
The new head of the Red May, Tachihara initially manages to escape from the Special Security Force, but is eventually captured and tortured. He was also a pawn of Maisaka. Hacker and Peace attempt to bring him to Ichihara's laboratory for safety, but the three are killed by Lucifer on the highway.

=== Voice cast ===
Character	Actor	
Character	Japanese	English
Narrator	Masaaki Yajima	Bob Sessions
Isamu "Raiden" Sakada	Masashi Ebara	John Hunter
Yō "Angel" Mikawa	Mika Doi	Sharon Holm
Yuji "Hacker" Fuse	Akio Otsuka	John Bull
Reika "Peace" Yogawa	Rei Sakuma	Barbara Barnes
Chief Taki	Kenji Utsumi	Bob Sessions
Chief Togawa	Tessho Genda	Peter Woodward (as Peter Wood)
Tachihara	Toshihiko Seki	Daniel Flynn
Dr. Ichihara	Koichi Kitamura	Peter Marinker
Lucifer	Kumiko Hironaka	Lorelei King
Asura	Nozomu Sasaki	Jay Benedict
Freya	Yuko Mizutani	Barbara Barnes
Masumi "Kuwata" Hirakawa	Mikio Terashima	Garrick Hagon
Governor Maisaka	Osamu Saka	Jesse Vogel
Takeshi Suyama	Hajime Koseki	
Frenchie	Tessho Genda	
Division Leader	Hidenari Ugaki	
Tango Leader	Kiyoyuki Yanada	
Delta One	Toshiharu Sakurai	
Subordinate	Takuma Suzuki	

Additional voices (Japanese): Atsushi Anbe, Emi Shinohara, Hajime Koseki, Hidetoshi Nakamura, Hitoshi Horiki, Kiyonobu Suzuki, Kyousei Tsukui, Shigeru Shiibashi, Takeshi Oba

Additional voices (English): Colin Bruce, John Fitzgerald Jay, William Dufris, William Roberts

== Releases ==
Originally licensed by Manga Entertainment, Discotek Media have announced in May 2018 that they acquired the rights to the OVA and announced a plan to re-release it on DVD and Blu-ray in North America, with a new uncensored subtitle track, essays, an interview, trailers and will include the English dubbed version. Some anti-Semitic content within the original Japanese dialogue were censored from the previous Manga Entertainment English releases. The OVA was later re-released on Blu-ray as limited edition steelbook remastered from 35mm source prints on February 22, 2022.

== Episodes and staff ==
All episodes directed by Ichirō Itano, with character designs by Nobuteru Yūki, and musical score composed by Hiroshi Ogasawara.

#	Episode title	Screenplay by	Storyboards by	Animation director	Art director	Mechanical designer	Editor	Runtime	Original release date
1	"Special Security Force" (特殊公安, Tokushu Kōan)	Shō Aikawa	Ichirō Itano	Yasuomi Umetsu	Hiroshi Sasaki	Yasuhiro Moriki (Note: With mechanical animation direction by Masaharu Tomoda.)	Harutoshi Ogata	27 minutes	September 1, 1989 (Note: Re-released on April 21, 1994)
2	"The Disfigured City" (変貌都市, Henbō Toshi)	Shō Aikawa	Hiroyuki Kitakubo	Satoru Nakamura	Hiroshi Sasaki	Yasuhiro Moriki	Harutoshi Ogata	29 minutes	December 21, 1989
3	"The Death Warrant" (抹殺指令, Massatsu Shirei)	Shō Aikawa	Akihiko Yamashita	Hiroyuki Ochi	Hiroshi Sasaki	Yasuhiro Moriki	Harutoshi Ogata	29 minutes	February 11, 1990
4	"Pain" (痛み, Itami)	Ichirō Itano	Shōichi Masuo	Yasuhiro Seo	Hiroshi Sasaki	Kōichi Ōhata	Yukiko Itō	27 minutes	May 20, 1994
5	"Wrath of the Empire" (逆鱗, Gekirin)	Ichirō Itano	Hideki Takayama	Yasuhiro Seo	Satoru Hirono	Kōichi Ōhata	Yukiko Itō	25 minutes	May 20, 1994
6	"Doomsday" (天使, Tenshi)	Ichirō Itano	Ichirō Itano	Takehiro Nakayama	Hitoshi Nagao	Kōichi Ōhata	Yukiko Itō	37 minutes	May 20, 1994

== Reception ==
The anime entry in The Encyclopedia of Science Fiction notes that the show is a "absurd, action-packed and gore-heavy anime with only one sympathetic character", as well as "a deeply unpleasant mix" of racism, conspiracy theories, anti-Semitism and nationalism.
