= Hiroo Isono =

Japanese painter and illustrator (1945–2013)

- 磯野宏夫
- Born: 1945; Japan
- Died: 28 May 2013 (aged 67–68)
- Known for: Painting, illustration
- Notable work: Forest-themed paintings

Hiroo Isono (磯野宏夫, Isono Hiroo; 1945–2013) was a Japanese painter and illustrator known for his detailed forest landscapes and nature‑themed imagery. Active in the late 20th and early 21st centuries. His work continued to be exhibited posthumously, including a major memorial exhibition in 2023 at the Furukawa Art Museum’s Furusawa Saburō Memorial Hall.

== Artistic style ==
Isono’s paintings are characterized by detailed depictions of forests, natural light, and atmospheric landscapes, themes highlighted in the 2023 memorial exhibition Eternal Forest. The exhibition materials emphasize his focus on nature and his recurring use of forest imagery.

== Video game artwork ==
Isono contributed key visual artwork to several titles in the Mana (聖剣伝説) series, published by Square Enix. He provided the main visual for Final Fantasy Adventure (Seiken Densetsu: Final Fantasy Gaiden) in 1991, and continued illustrating for the series with titles such as Secret of Mana (Seiken Densetsu 2) in 1993 and Heroes of Mana (Seiken Densetsu: Heroes of Mana) in 2007.

== Exhibitions ==
A major memorial exhibition, Isono Hiroo Painting Exhibition – Eternal Forest (特別展「磯野宏夫絵画展 ～ 永遠の森」), was held at the Furukawa Art Museum’s Furusawa Saburō Memorial Hall (爲三郎記念館) in Nagoya from 21 October to 17 December 2023. A secondary listing also documents the exhibition and its thematic focus on forests and natural environments.
