= Ichirō Itano =

Japanese animator, director and producer

- 板野 一郎
- Born: March 11, 1959 (age 67); Yokohama, Kanagawa, Japan
- Occupations: Animator, director, producer
- Employer(s): Studio Musashi (mid/late 1970s); Studio Cockpit (late 1970s); Nippon Sunrise (late 1970s); Bebow (early 1980s); Kugatsusha (early 1980s); Artland (early 1980s); DAST Corporation (CEO, 1986~2011); Graphinica (Advisor, 2011~2019); Konyoshi (Technical adivsor, 2024~)
- Known for: Mechanical animation director on several Macross projects
- Notable work: Angel Cop, Battle Royal High School, Blassreiter

Ichirō Itano (板野 一郎, Itano Ichirō; born March 11, 1959 in Yokohama, Kanagawa) is a Japanese animator, director, and producer. He has worked in a number of science fiction anime series, especially mecha-themed ones. He created several original video animations including Angel Cop, and Battle Royal High School. He directed on Megazone 23. He also directed on a number of episodes and films related to Macross. He also directed Gantz, and worked on series composition and direction for Blassreiter.

Following the dissolution of his own company, DAST Corporation, Itano was affiliated with Graphinica as an advisor to the studio's CG team created by former members of GONZO for around 10 years. He teaches younger generation as an adviser in the company. Since retiring a studio of Crusher Joe and joined Macross, he lost touch with Yoshikazu Yasuhiko, his instructor. However, they reunited again after nearly 30 years in a project relating to artbooks of Gundam, and have worked together on production of Mobile Suit Gundam: The Origin. Since around 2024, Itano has been the technical advisor for studio Konyoshi, founded by former members of Graphinica's CG team.

== Itano Circus ==
Itano is best known among anime fans for a style of action scene that he developed, usually nicknamed "Itano Circus" (板野サーカス, Itano sākasu) or "Macross missile massacre" by fans; it refers to a highly stylized and acrobatic method of depicting aerial combat and dogfights in many anime, particularly the Macross series.

The production in Space Runaway Ideon became a hot topic in the anime industry, and it came to be called this by comparing the brisk movement of mechanics to the air acrobatics of the circus. The name first appeared in the 1982 November issue of My Anime, Kazutaka Miyatake of mechanic designer said "Although we call it Itano Circus, ..." in the interview, and the featured article was published in the next month issue. The circus is named after the acrobatic flight of a 3-plane formation by Minoru Genda, a pilot of Imperial Japanese Navy Air Service at a dedication ceremony, which was called "Genda Circus".

The battle scenes of the conventional mecha animation took the style of "duel" using guns and swords such as Western (genre) and Jidaigeki and there were many staging which emphasized the heaviness and posing (decision pose) of the robot. A good example of this is sword fight in battle scenes such as Gundam. He created new scenes with the acrobatic moves.

The animated action sequence technique became more famous when Itano used it for the "dogfights" depicted in The Super Dimension Fortress Macross anime TV series from 1982. The Itano Circus is characterized by detailed, fluid shading of the mecha, the close-range acrobatic moves the dueling fighters make in combat, as well as twisting contrails left by fighters and missiles. It is also commonly used in specific reference to an attack where a mecha or spaceship launches a large swarm of guided missiles with meticulously animated spiraling smoke trails and erratic trajectories and its target is repeatedly dodging those missiles at a high speed.

The origin is the scene where a rocket is fired from a Saburo/Hakaider's motorcycle in Android Kikaider which he saw in his childhood. When he was a student, he imitated this and played a game in which he attached rocket fireworks to the front fork of his beloved car and shot them all at once while chasing each other on the seashore. He talked "The chase was more interesting than the attack when I played this." Applying the experience of running side by side with the fireworks to the anime expression is the screen composition of the three-dimensional sense. In addition, the speed is emphasized more by the contrivance of the camera work such as the change of the photographing lens and the frame.

=== Characteristic rendition ===
According to "Sci-Fi anime is interesting―from Gundam to Evangelion―", these are mentioned as follows:

==== Firing missiles in unison ====
A synonym for Itano Circus born from rocket fireworks. Focusing on missiles, which have been treated as subweapons in conventional mecha anime, Itano made an appeal of "large number of bullets" and "movement of missiles". The missiles take intricate, intertwined tracks and draw three-dimensional, artistic wakes with white smoke. Because of this, it is also called "Natto missile". Even if they are the same missile, the characters are divided into "honor student type" which flies in a straight line to a target, "bright type" which predicts the target's mobility and makes a forehead, and "inferior grade type" which flies in a zigzag pattern to be conspicuous. Besides the maneuvering of the target aircraft to avoid them in an emergency is also a highlight, and in some cases, missiles passing through the screen without heading toward the target is depicted. According to Itano, "The orbit is the most important for a missile" and "Itano Circus if the flow is clear, even with one or two missiles."

==== Lens effect ====
Depending on the position of the subject in the shooting camera, the picture is drawn so that it switches to a telephoto lens at a long distance, a standard lens in the middle, and a fisheye lens at the front, giving an impression of the depth and speed of the screen. For example, a missile launched at the back of the screen changes to a wider curved image as it approaches the viewer from a telephoto image. Itano calls it "Angle Animation".

==== Moving body perspective ====
It is camera work moving freely like aerial photography of skydiving. It follows the subject from a subjective point of view, and adds frame-in and frame-out to give a sense of reality. To be more extreme, it can also be defined as the concept of tracking an object with minimal camera work. Since the adoption of 3DCG, this trend has been particularly conspicuous, and the movement of the camera, which is delayed for a moment, is the most remarkable. Therefore, Itano's three-dimensional battle scene is more impressive to viewers. In the 3D shooter games of Macross, he supervises a "variable view" that makes the player's fuselage look like it's being shot with a camera.

==== Explosion and collapse effect ====
Considering the structure of the object to be destroyed, processes such as internal detonation by the hit (for example, a scene in which an enemy ship was destroyed in a Daedalus attack.) and collapse by the shock wave are depicted separately. It is also characterized by numerous explosive lights that flicker from circular to crescent-shaped.

==== Cruel description ====
Since his days as an original painter, he has often been depicted as an extreme splatter, such as a character's head flying or head crushing. The scene of Char Aznable shooting Kycilia Zabi at Gundam also obscures what was clearly depicted in the original. Although it was ripped off in TV series, there were quite cruel scenes in movies and OVAs, and in some cases, they were cut entirely in the overseas export version.

=== Impact ===
At the end of the 1970s, young animators called "Kanada followers" appeared among anime fans who were fascinated by Yoshinori Kanada's effects scenes and opening animations. Itano, who was also inspired by Kanada, stated, "Itano Circus was born because I wanted to absorb Mr.Kanada's good points and find a way to express myself. I think he has made Itano Circus what it is". Influenced by dynamic perspective and explosion of "Kanada Action", the acrobatic circus technique was analyzed by frame advance on VCRs, which were becoming popular at that time, and inspired younger animators.

This trend has continued since the 2000s, Makoto Shinkai, produced personally Voices of a Distant Star, said, "I watched Macross Plus and Mobile Suit Gundam 0083: Stardust Memory by frame and referred to the mechanical action." Moreover, as a fan of Itano, Chikashi Kubota, an animator, showed similar works in Magical Shopping Arcade Abenobashi(ep. 3), Gurren Lagann(ep. 14), and Space Dandy(ep. 23).

Action staging such as missile shooting is common, but Shōji Kawamori said, "Although some animators can draw beautiful and speedy missiles, few can draw "a painful missile" like him."

Besides there is also a theory that people involved in Hollywood movies who saw Itano Circus in the video of Macross: Do You Remember Love? used it as a hint for aerial photography in the movie Top Gun. Neill Blomkamp, an avid fan of Macross, included "Natto missile" in the scene in his film District 9 in which a powered suit fired a missile.

As an homage to Itano Circus, digital art collective teamLab Inc. created Crows are chased and the chasing crows are destined to be chased as well, Division in Perspective which is a three-dimensional reproduction of "Deformed Space" drawn in a two-dimensional animation.

=== Fostering the next generation ===
According to Itano, only the three animators who have fully mastered Itano Circus are Hideaki Anno, Masami Gotō and Yasushi Muraki. Anno mentioned his name as the first master in the animation world and said, "I was taught an uncompromising creative attitude." "It's hard to get there though I'm trying. I tried to cross, but I can't." , and Cutie Honey, a live-action film by him, also has a kind of homage. Gotō and Muraki were influenced by Ideon and Macross and drew speedy aerial battles in Cowboy Bebop and Eureka Seven respectively.

Although Itano himself did not participate in the work Macross after the completion of Macross Zero, the creators of Satelight, unknownCASE and Graphinica, who were in charge of Macross Frontier Sayonara no Tsubasa's CG, are disciples who received guidance from him. Regarding Hiroshi Yaghishita (Macross Frontier) and Jō Harada (Basquash!) of Satelight, Itano said, "Harada is conferred first and full mastership of Itano Circus of CG, and Yagishita is the best student among the graduates."

When he was participating from Ultraman Nexus to Ultraman Mebius, he taught the CGI team of Tsuburaya Productions and influenced later tokusatsu productions. In 2011, he announced the dissolution of the D.A.S.T. which he presided over, saying, "All the people I need to grow have already graduated, so I'm going to do what I like."

== Anecdote ==
In terms of practical application, Itano is a distinct physical person in the anime industry. He was nicknamed "battle animator" and left many episodes.

Motorcycle
- He rode his motorcycle through gaps in trucks and buses, claiming to improve his dynamic vision. When he appeared on BS Anime Yawa of NHK, he introduced himself and said, "I think I improved the dynamic eyesight of Japanese children."
- Inspired by Mad Max 2, he ran up the pedestrian bridge on his motorcycle.
- When he was riding a motorbike, he got angry at being pushed to the side of a truck and turned back. He fell down as a result, but continued to abuse the truck driver even though he fell down.
- At the time of production of Megazone 23 he attached photographic equipment to a motorcycle and did location scouting on the Tokyo metropolitan area. His black Honda VT250F was adorned with a skull and crossbones reminiscent of the Roy Focker.
- According to Gen Urobuchi, he retired from painting after a motorcycle accident with a wrist injury and began to concentrate on his job as a director.
Works
- He became an animator because he happened to see a recruitment ad while he was suspended from high school, and also to reassure his parents by getting a job.
- He temporarily worked in a stunt office (didn't stunt work).
- When he produced Gundam, the director complained "This move is too fast." but he was not satisfied and changed the timesheet to move Bit of Elmeth while the director was out. His sense was recognized by Yoshiyuki Tomino who saw this scene in a preview.
- Due to murderous schedule of Macross, he was hospitalized twice for hematemesis and hematuria. Although his doctor told him he would be hospitalized immediately, he participated in an eight-hour endurance race on Honda Super Cub.
- He is also a creator of Perfect Gundam in Plamo-Kyoshiro. As he was participating in Mobile Suit Gundam anime TV series, he thought of it as a fighting equipment against Zeong, and he drew it between the original drawing works. He was so busy that forgot to design it, but he knew it was commercialized when he saw the plastic model at the model store.
- When he created Macross Plus, he went to the United States with Kawamori and experienced a mock air battle. To experience the extreme conditions of the pilot, he pulled the control stick straight up without the instructor's permission and experienced blackouts and G-LOC.
- At the wrap-up party, the president of a finishing company hit him and said, "How many people do you think quit because of you?"

== Filmography ==
Year	Title	Crew role	Notes	Source
1979-80	Mobile Suit Gundam	Animator		
1981–82	Mobile Suit Gundam	Animator	film series	
1982	Space Runaway Ideon: Be Invoked	Animator		
1982–83	The Super Dimension Fortress Macross	Mechanical animation director		
1983	Crusher Joe	Animator		
1984	Urusei Yatsura 2: Beautiful Dreamer	Original picture		
1984	Macross: Do You Remember Love?	Drawing director		
1985–86	Megazone 23	Storyboard, Unit Director, Drawing Director, Action Director	OVAs and films	
1987	Royal Space Force: The Wings of Honnêamise	Key animation		
1987	Battle Royal High School	Director, screenplay, storyboard		
1987	Good Morning Althea	Original draft		
1988	Violence Jack: Evil Town	Director, Composition		
1989	Spirit Warrior	Director	Ova episode 2	
1989-94	Angel Cop	Director		
1992	Star Dust	Original draft, Director		
1994	Macross Plus	Special skills director	Also film version in 1995	
1999	Mito's Great Adventure: The Two Queens	Mecha design, CG Supervisor		
2002	Rayca ja:零花～rayca	3D motion director		
2002	Macross Zero	Special skills director		
2004	Gantz	Director		
2008	Blassreiter	Series composition, Director		
2008	Linebarrels of Iron	Special skills director		
2014	Expelled from Paradise	Motion Advisor		
2015	Mobile Suit Gundam: The Origin Episode 1	Unit director, storyboard artist, and key animator for avant animation	OVA	
2016	SSSS.Gridman	Design of kaiju		

== See also ==
- List of anime stakeholders
- Shirobako - A 2014 anime television series set in the anime industry. An animator named "Saburō Kitano" modeled after Itano appears.
