= Brandish =

Brandish may refer to:

- Brandish (series), a four-game action role-playing video game series
  - Brandish (video game), a 1991 action role-playing video game and the first video game in the Brandish series
- Brandish Corner, a point on the TT Course, on the A18 road in the Isle of Man
- Brandish Street, a hamlet in Selworthy, England
- Myra Brandish, a recurring character in The Venture Bros.

Brandishing may refer to:

- Brandishing or brattishing, decorative cresting in architecture
- Brandishing or menacing, a type of violent crime in American criminal law
