= Nobuteru Yūki =

Japanese manga artist

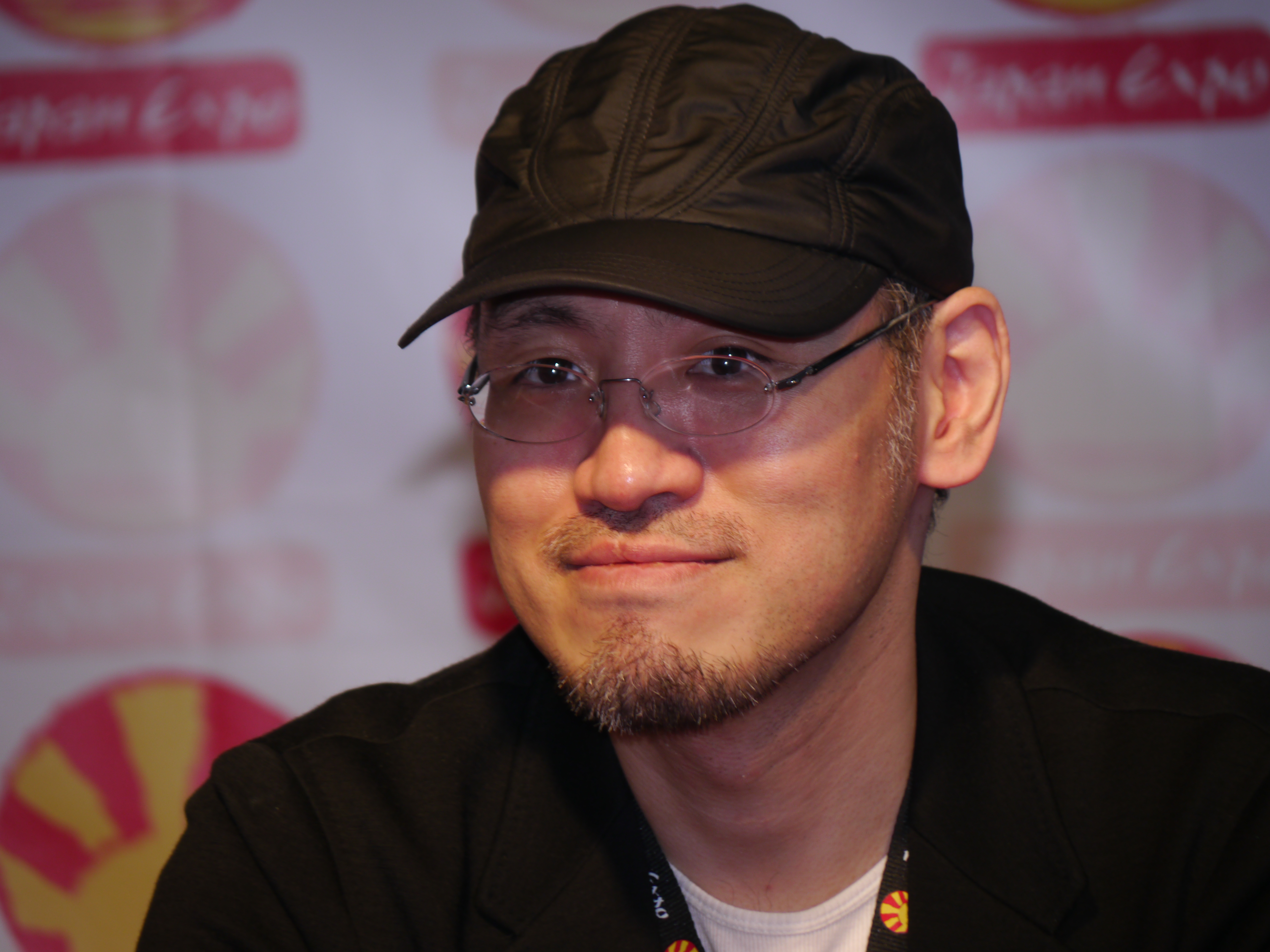
Nobuteru Yūki

Nobuteru Yūki (結城 信輝, Yūki Nobuteru; born December 24, 1962, in Tokyo) is a Japanese manga artist, illustrator, animator and doujinshi artist. He has designed characters for manga, anime and video games, and has frequently collaborated with director Kazuki Akane, including on his most famous work, The Vision of Escaflowne. After working at Artland and D.A.S.T. (Ichirō Itano's animation studio, which he ran after becoming independent from Artland), he is currently working as a freelancer.

== Career ==
Yūki graduated from Saitama Prefectural Toda Shoyo High School and has been active in the school's "Manga and Anime Research Interest Club" (now Manga and Anime Research Club). He found business in the National Health Insurance but couldn't give up on being an animator, so he left and became an animator instead. He is good friends with Mamoru Nagano, Maria Kawamura and Fumio Iida (SUEZEN), and they used to go to Tokyo Disneyland on Christmas Eve, which is also Yūki's birthday.

He works on doujinshi under the circles The Man in the High Castle (高い城の男, Takai shiro no otoko) and Ubik (ユービック, Yūbikku), both references to the works of American science fiction author Philip K. Dick. The published doujinshi include key animation from his body of work and specially drawn manga. On the other hand, since he worked on Ralphilia Saga by Akara Arisato (Dengeki Bunko), he has been involved in several works as a guest member of the doujin circle La Moon.

Yūki has also attended several international animation festivals as a guest of honor, including Anime Expo, Animazement, Polymanga and Otakon.

== Works ==
=== Anime series ===
- Bionic Six (character designer)
- Heat Guy J (character designer, animation director)
- Kids on the Slope (character designer, assistant animation director, ep. 12)
- Maken-ki! (character designer)
- Orange (character designer)
- Paradise Kiss (character designer, chief animation director)
- Rainy Day Serenade (character designer)
- Space Battleship Yamato 2199 (character designer)
- Space Pirate Captain Herlock: The Endless Odyssey (character designer, animation director)
- Toward the Terra (character designer)
- The Vision of Escaflowne (character designer)
- Under Ninja (character designer)
- Xenosaga: The Animation (character designer)

=== Movies ===
- Escaflowne (character designer, animation director)
- The Five Star Stories (character designer, animation director)
- The Weathering Continent (character designer)
- X (character designer, animation director)

=== OVA ===
- Angel Cop (character designer)
- Battle Angel Alita (character designer)
- Battle Royal High School (character designer, animation director, key animator)
- Cleopatra DC (character designer, animation director)
- Clover (character designer, animation director)
- Record of Lodoss War (character designer, animation director)
- Sukeban Deka (character designer)

=== Video games ===
- Azure Dreams (promotional artwork, Japanese cover)
- Blade Arts: Tasogare no Miyako R'lyeh (character designer)
- Brandish (package and manual illustrations)
- Chrono Cross (character designer)
- Dragon Force II (character designer)
- Kaiser Knuckle (known outside Japan as Global Champion; image illustrator)
- Ragnarok Online Opening Movie (character designer, animation director)
- Seiken Densetsu 3 (character designer)
- Solatorobo: Red the Hunter (character designer)
- Fuga: Melodies of Steel (cover artist)
- Tail Concerto (character designer)
- Trinity Trigger (world designer)

== Written works ==
Vaelber Saga, Yūki's 1990 manga.

=== Manga ===
- Vaelber Saga (1990–2003)

=== Art books ===
- 1999 a WORK of CLOVER
- Anvil Rough-Drawings
- Anvil II Rough-Drawings
- Anvil III Rough-Drawing Works
- Chrono Cross - Missing Piece
- Escaflowne Fan Book (for the feature film)
- Escaflowne Fan Book (for the TV series)
- The Five Star Stories
- Heat Guy J
- Heat Guy J Rough-Drawing Works
- Heat Guy J Second II
- Phantasien
- The revise pictures of XX
- Seikendensetsu III Illustration Book
- Senshi Bankō: Phantasien II
- Solatorobo LITTLE TAIL BRONX ARCHIVES VOL 1–3
- Toward the Terra Pilot Film
- Xenosaga: The Animation—Character Design
