= Secret of Mana =

1993 video game

- North American SNES box art
- Developer: Square
- Publishers: Square; Square Enix (mobile)
- Director: Koichi Ishii
- Producer: Hiromichi Tanaka
- Designers: Koichi Ishii; Hiromichi Tanaka
- Programmer: Nasir Gebelli
- Artists: Shinichi Kameoka; Hiroo Isono
- Writer: Hiromichi Tanaka
- Composer: Hiroki Kikuta
- Series: Mana
- Platforms: Super Nintendo Entertainment System, Nintendo Switch (original); Mobile phone, iOS, Android (enhanced); PlayStation 4, PlayStation Vita, Windows (remake)
- Release: August 6, 1993: Super NES; JP: August 6, 1993; NA: October 1993; PAL: November 25, 1994; Mobile (Enhanced); JP: October 26, 2009; iOS (Enhanced); WW: December 21, 2010; Android (Enhanced); WW: October 30, 2014; Switch (Collection of Mana); JP: June 1, 2017; WW: June 11, 2019; PS4, Vita, Windows (Remake); WW: February 15, 2018
- Genre: Action role-playing
- Modes: Single-player, multiplayer

Secret of Mana, originally released in Japan as Seiken Densetsu 2, (Note: Japanese: 聖剣伝説(せいけんでんせつ)2; lit. The Legend of the Sacred Sword 2) is a 1993 action role-playing game developed and published by Square for the Super Nintendo Entertainment System. It is the sequel to the 1991 game Seiken Densetsu, released in North America as Final Fantasy Adventure and in Europe as Mystic Quest. Secret of Mana was the first Seiken Densetsu title to be marketed as part of the Mana series rather than the Final Fantasy series. Set in a high fantasy universe, the game follows three heroes as they attempt to prevent an empire from conquering the world with the power of an ancient flying fortress.

Rather than using a turn-based battle system like contemporaneous role-playing games, Secret of Mana features real-time battles with a power bar mechanic. The game has a unique Ring Command menu system, which pauses the action and allows the player to make decisions in the middle of battle. An innovative cooperative multiplayer system allows a second or third player to drop in and out of the game at any time. Secret of Mana was directed and designed by Koichi Ishii, programmed primarily by Nasir Gebelli, and produced by veteran Square designer Hiromichi Tanaka.

The game received acclaim for its brightly colored graphics, expansive plot, Ring Command menu system, and innovative real-time battle system. Critics also praised Hiroki Kikuta's soundtrack and the customizable artificial intelligence settings for computer-controlled allies. Retrospectively, it has been considered one of the greatest games of all time by critics. It was re-released on Virtual Console on the Wii in 2008 and Wii U in 2013, as an enhanced version on multiple mobile platforms between 2009 and 2019, on Switch as part of Collection of Mana in 2017 and 2019, and was remade in 3D in 2018 for PlayStation 4, Vita and Windows. The remake saw mixed reviews, with many faulting its lack of gameplay improvements and reworked graphics.

== Gameplay ==
The standard overhead view. The party's attack strength and remaining health is shown in the gauges at the bottom.

Flammie flying and demonstrating Mode 7

Like many other role-playing games of the 16-bit era, Secret of Mana displays a top-down perspective, in which the player characters navigate the terrain and fight off hostile creatures. The game features three such characters: the hero, the girl, and the sprite, named Randi, Primm, and Popoi outside the initial North American and European releases. The player can also choose their own names for them. The player can choose to control each of the characters at any time; whichever character is currently selected, the other two companions are controlled via artificial intelligence. The game may be played simultaneously by up to three players, made possible by the Super Multitap accessory for the Super NES console. The Virtual Console version of the game supports three-player gameplay via additional GameCube controllers or Classic Controllers.

Each character possesses individual strengths and weaknesses. The hero, while unable to use magic, masters weapons at a quicker rate; the girl is a healer, able to cast restorative and support spells; and the sprite casts offensive magic to damage and impair enemies. Upon collecting enough experience points in battle, each character increases in level and improves in areas such as strength and evasion. The trio can rest in towns, where they can regain hit points or purchase restorative items and equipment. Options such as changing equipment, casting spells, or checking status are performed by cycling through the game's Ring Commands, a circular menu which hovers over the currently controlled party member. The game is momentarily paused whenever the Ring Commands appear.

Combat takes place in real-time. Located at the bottom of the screen is a power bar, a gauge that determines the amount of damage done to an enemy when attacking. Swinging a weapon causes the gauge to empty and then quickly recharge, allowing that character to attack at full strength. The party wields eight different types of weaponry: sword, spear, bow, axe, boomerang, glove, whip, and javelin. All weapons can be upgraded eight times, and repeated use of a weapon increases its skill level to a maximum of eight, unlocking a new special attack with each level. Weapons are upgraded with Weapon Orbs, which are found in dungeons or earned by defeating certain bosses. The player takes each Orb to a blacksmith, located in most towns, who uses it to reforge one weapon.

In order to learn magic, the party must rescue spirits known as Elementals. The eight Elementals represent different elements—such as water, earth, and life—and each provides the player with specific spells. Magic has skill levels similar to weapons, but each magic spell costs magic points to cast.

At the start of the game, to reach a destination, players must traverse an enemy-infested countryside. Travel may be expedited with Cannon Travel Centers, where the party may be launched to faraway destinations via a giant cannon. Cannon Travel usually requires a fee, but is mandatory to visit other continents later on. Later, the party is given access to Flammie, a miniature dragon which is controlled by the player and able to fly freely across the world, represented by an overworld map. These sequences make use of the SNES's Mode 7 capability to create a rotatable background, giving the illusion that the ground beneath Flammie is rendered in three dimensions. While riding Flammie, the player may access either the "rotated map", which presents the world as a globe, or the "world map", a two-dimensional view of the overworld.

== Plot ==
=== Setting and characters ===
The story takes place in a high fantasy world, which contains an ethereal energy source named "mana". An ancient, technologically advanced civilization exploited mana to construct the "Mana Fortress", a flying warship. This angered the world's gods, who sent giant beasts to war with the civilization. The conflict was globally destructive and nearly exhausted all signs of mana in the world, until a hero used the power of the Mana Sword to destroy the fortress and the civilization. The world began to recover in peace. As the game opens, an empire seeks eight Mana Seeds, which when "unsealed" will restore mana to the world and allow the empire to restore the Mana Fortress.

The three main characters do not have names in the original SNES release, though their names appear in the manual of the Japanese release; their names were added into the game in the mobile ports. In all versions, the player can choose to name the characters whatever they wish. The hero (ランディ, Randi), a young boy, is adopted by the Elder of Potos before the start of the game, after the boy's mother disappears. The girl (プリム, Primm) is in love with a warrior named Dyluck, who was ordered by the king to attack Elinee's Castle. Angered by the king's actions and by her father's attempt to arrange her marriage to a local nobleman, she leaves the castle to save Dyluck and to accompany the hero as well. The hero meets a sprite child (ポポイ, Popoi) at the Dwarf Village. The sprite lives with a dwarf and goes with the characters to learn more about their family. It does not remember anything about its past, so it joins the team to try to recover its memories.

=== Story ===
The game begins as three boys from the small Potos village disobey their Elder's instructions and trespass into a local waterfall, where a treasure is said to be kept. One of the boys stumbles and falls into the lake, where he finds a rusty sword embedded in a stone. Guided by a disembodied voice, he pulls the sword free, inadvertently unleashing monsters in the surrounding countryside of the village. The villagers interpret the sword's removal as a bad omen and banish the boy from Potos forever. A traveling knight named Jema recognizes the blade as the legendary Mana Sword and encourages the hero to re-energize it by visiting the eight Mana Temples.

During his journey, the hero is joined by the girl and the sprite. Throughout their travels, the trio is pursued by the Empire. The Emperor and his subordinates are being manipulated by Thanatos, an ancient sorcerer who hopes to create a "new, peaceful world". Due to his own body's deterioration, Thanatos is in need of a suitable body to possess. After placing the entire kingdom of Pandora under a trance, he abducts two candidates: Dyluck, now enslaved, and a young Pandoran girl named Phanna; he eventually chooses to possess Dyluck.

The Empire succeeds in unsealing all eight Mana Seeds. Thanatos, however, betrays the Emperor and his henchmen, killing them and seizing control of the Mana Fortress for himself. The hero and his party journey to locate the Mana Tree, the focal point of the world's life energy. Anticipating their arrival, Thanatos positions the Mana Fortress over the Tree and destroys it. The charred remains of the Tree speak to the heroes, explaining that a giant dragon called the Mana Beast will soon be summoned to combat the Fortress. The Beast has little control over its rage and will likely destroy the world as well. The Mana Tree also reveals that it was once the human wife of Serin, the original Mana Knight and the hero's father. The voice heard at Potos' waterfall was that of Serin's ghost.

The trio flies to the Mana Fortress and confronts Thanatos, who is preparing to transfer his mind into Dyluck. With the last of his strength, Dyluck warns that Thanatos has sold his soul to the underworld and must not be allowed to have the Fortress. Dyluck kills himself, forcing Thanatos to revert to a skeletal lich form, which the party defeats.

The Mana Beast finally flies in and attacks the Fortress. The hero expresses reluctance to kill the Beast, fearing that with the dispersal of Mana from the world, the sprite will vanish. With the sprite's encouragement, he uses the fully energized Mana Sword to slay the Beast, causing it to explode and transform into snow. At the conclusion of the game, the sprite child vanishes into an astral plane, the girl is returned home, and the hero is seen welcomed back in Potos, returning the Mana Sword to its place beneath the waterfall.

== Development ==
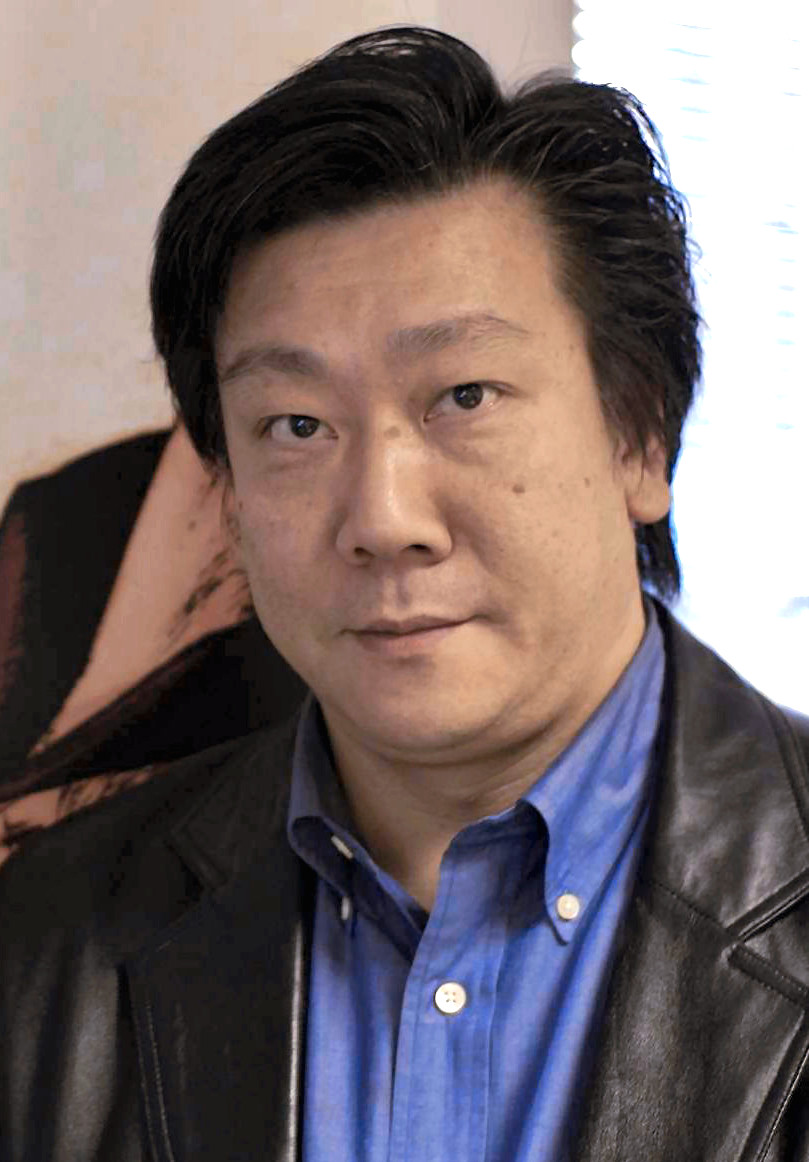
Secret of Mana writer and producer Hiromichi Tanaka

Secret of Mana was directed and designed by Koichi Ishii, the creator of the game's Game Boy predecessor, Final Fantasy Adventure. He has stated that he feels Secret of Mana is more "his game" than other projects he has worked on, such as the Final Fantasy series. The game was programmed primarily by Nasir Gebelli and produced by veteran Square designer Hiromichi Tanaka. The team hoped to build on the foundation of Final Fantasy Adventure, and they included several modified elements from that game and from other popular Square titles in Secret of Mana. In addition to having better graphics and sound quality than its predecessor, the attack power gauge was changed to be more engaging, and the weapon leveling system replaced Final Fantasy Adventure's system of leveling up the speed of the attack gauge. The party system also received an upgrade from the first Mana game: instead of temporary companions who could not be upgraded, party members became permanent protagonists and could be controlled by other players. The multiplayer component was not a part of the original design, but was added when the developers realized that they could easily make all three characters human-controlled.

The real-time battle system used in Secret of Mana has been described by its creators as an extension of the battle system used in the first three flagship Final Fantasy titles. The system for experience points and leveling up was taken from Final Fantasy III. According to Tanaka, the game's battle system features mechanics that had first been considered for Final Fantasy IV. Similarly, unused features in Secret of Mana were appropriated by the Chrono Trigger team, which (like Final Fantasy IV) was in production at the time. According to Tanaka, the project was originally intended to be Final Fantasy IV, with a "more action-based, dynamic overworld". It "wound up not being" Final Fantasy IV anymore, and instead became a separate project codenamed "Chrono Trigger" during development, before finally becoming Seiken Densetsu 2. Tanaka said that it "always felt like a sequel" to Final Fantasy III for him.

Secret of Mana was originally planned to be a launch title for the SNES-CD add-on. After the contract between Nintendo and Sony to produce the add-on failed, and Sony repurposed its work on the SNES-CD into the competing PlayStation console, Square adapted the game for the SNES cartridge format. The game had to be altered to fit the storage space of a SNES game cartridge, which is much smaller than that of a CD-ROM. The developers initially resisted continuing the project without the CD add-on, believing that too much of the game would have to be cut, but they were overruled by company management. As a result of the hardware change, several features had to be cut from the game, and some completed work needed to be redone. One of the most significant changes was the removal of the option to take multiple routes through the game that led to several possible endings, in contrast to the linear journey in the final product. The plot that remained was different from the original conception, and Tanaka has said that the original story had a much darker tone. Ishii has estimated that up to forty percent of the planned game was dropped to meet the space limitations, and critics have suggested that the hardware change led to technical problems when too much happens at once in the game.

=== Music ===
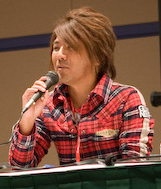
Secret of Mana composer Hiroki Kikuta

The original score for Secret of Mana was composed and produced by Hiroki Kikuta. Kenji Ito, who had composed the soundtrack for Final Fantasy Adventure, was originally slated for the project, but was replaced with Kikuta after he had started on other projects, such as Romancing SaGa. Secret of Mana was Kikuta's first video game score, and he encountered difficulties in dealing with the hardware limitations of the Super NES. Kikuta tried to express in the music two "contrasting styles" to create an original score which would be neither pop music nor standard game music. Kikuta worked on the music mostly by himself, spending nearly 24 hours a day in his office, alternating between composing and editing to create a soundtrack that would be, according to him, "immersive" and "three-dimensional". Rather than having sound engineers create the samples of instruments like most game music composers of the time, Kikuta made his own samples that matched the hardware capabilities of the Super NES. These custom samples allowed him to know exactly how each piece would sound on the system's hardware, so he did not have to worry about differences between the original composition and the Super NES. Kikuta stated in 2001 that he considered the score for Secret of Mana his favorite creation.

The soundtrack's music includes both "ominous" and "light-hearted" tracks, and is noted for its use of bells and "dark, solemn pianos". Kikuta's compositions for the game were partly inspired by natural landscapes, as well as music from Bali. Hardware limitations made the title screen to the game slowly fade in, and Kikuta designed the title track to the game, "Fear of the Heavens", to sync up with the screen. At that time, composers rarely tried to match a game's music to its visuals. Kikuta also started the track off with a "whale noise", rather than a traditional "ping", in order to try to "more deeply connect" the player with the game from the moment it started up. Getting the sound to work with the memory limitations of the Super NES was a difficult technical challenge.

An official soundtrack album, Seiken Densetsu 2 Original Sound Version, was released in Japan in August 1993, containing 44 musical tracks from the game. An English version, identical to the Japanese original aside from its localized packaging and track titles, was later released in North America in December 1994 as Secret of Mana Original Soundtrack, making Secret of Mana one of the first Japanese games to inspire a localized soundtrack release outside of Japan. An album of arranged music from Secret of Mana and its sequel Seiken Densetsu 3 was produced in 1993 as Secret of Mana+. The music in the album was all composed and arranged by Kikuta. Secret of Mana+ contains a single track, titled "Secret of Mana", that incorporates themes from the music of both Secret of Mana and Seiken Densetsu 3, which was still under development at the time. The style of the album has been described by critics as "experimental", using "strange sounds" such as waterfalls, bird calls, cell phone sounds, and "typing" sounds. The music has also been described by critics as covering many different musical styles, such as "Debussian impressionist styles, his own heavy electronic and synth ideas, and even ideas of popular musicians". The latest album of music from the game is a 2012 arranged album titled Secret of Mana Genesis / Seiken Densetsu 2 Arrange Album. The 16 tracks are upgraded versions of the original Super NES tracks, and Kikuta said in the liner notes for the album that they are "how he wanted the music to sound when he wrote it", without the limitations of the Super NES hardware. Critics such as Patrick Gann of RPGFan, however, noted that the differences were minor. A rendition of the soundtrack was commissioned for the first ever BBC Proms gaming music concert in 2022.

== Release ==
Secret of Mana was announced for a release in July 1993, marketed as a "Party Action RPG". It eventually came out on August 6 instead for the Japanese market. It was released later that same month in South Korea. The English translation for Secret of Mana was completed in only 30 days, mere weeks after the Japanese release, and the North American localization was initially advertised as Final Fantasy Adventure 2. Critics have suggested that the translation was done hastily so that the game could be released in North America for the 1993 holiday season. By October, the game was already available to the public. According to translator Ted Woolsey, a large portion of the game's script was cut out in the English localization due to space limitations. To display text on the main gameplay screen, the English translation uses a fixed-width font, which limits the amount of space available to display text. Woolsey was unhappy that he had to trim conversations to their bare essentials and that he had so little time for translation, commenting that it "nearly killed me". The script was difficult to translate as it was presented to Woolsey in disordered groups of text, like "shuffling a novel". Other localizations were done in German and French. The Japanese release only named the three protagonists in the manual, while Western versions omitted the characters' names until the enhanced port for mobile devices. The game released in Europe on November 25, 1994.

In 1999, Square announced they would be porting Secret of Mana to Bandai's handheld system WonderSwan Color as one of nine planned games for the system. No such port was ever released. The game was released on Virtual Console on the Wii in 2008 and on Wii U, only in Japan, in 2013. A mobile phone port of Secret of Mana was released on October 26, 2009. A port of the game for iOS was revealed at E3 2010, and released on Apple's App Store on December 21, 2010. The port fixed several bugs, and the English script was both edited and retranslated from the original Japanese. The enhanced port from the iOS version was released on Android devices in 2014. A port for the Nintendo Switch was released with ports of Final Fantasy Adventure and Trials of Mana as part of the Collection of Mana on June 1, 2017, in Japan, and June 11, 2019 in the rest of the world. The game was released as one of the games included on the Super NES Classic Edition on September 29, 2017.

=== 3D remake ===
In August 2017, a 3D remake of the game was announced for PlayStation 4, PlayStation Vita and Windows and was released on February 15, 2018. The remake was developed by Q Studios for Square Enix. The project began in 2016 following positive feedback from Adventures of Mana, a remake of the original Mana game. The remake's gameplay was described as "basically the same" as the original, although it was redone using 3D graphics and some features were added for convenience such as an area map, increased game save opportunities, improved companion artificial intelligence, and voice acting. The offline multiplayer function was carried over into the different versions. The character art was redesigned by Haccan, an artist who had worked on Adventures of Mana. Kikuta returned to supervise new arrangements of his music, bringing in a number of other composers he knew who were fans of Secret of Mana. He described his approach as composing an "adult" version of the original tracks. At the request of the series producer, the main theme "Angel's Fear" was recorded with a full orchestra. The arranges included as Yuzo Koshiro and Tsuyoshi Sekito. The soundtrack was released as an album, also titled Secret of Mana Original Soundtrack, shortly after the remake's release in February 2018.

== Reception ==
=== Sales ===
The initial shipment of games in Japan sold out within days of the release date. Dengeki Oh magazine ranked it the second best-selling video game of 1993 in Japan, where 1.003 million units were sold that year, just below Street Fighter II Turbo. In South Korea, it was the top-selling game from November to December 1993.

Edge reported in November 1993 that the game was "the most widely covered game of the year in Japan" with a high number of sales, but was initially released in North America "completely un-hyped and mostly unheard of". Despite this, Secret of Mana went on to become the second top-selling Super NES game on the monthly US Babbage's chart in October 1993, below only Mortal Kombat, with Secret of Mana remaining in the US top ten SNES game charts for a year up until October 1994. It was also a success in Europe, where the game introduced many players to console role-playing games. In the United Kingdom, it was the fourth top-selling game in November 1994, and the second top-selling SNES game that month (below Donkey Kong Country).

According to Next Generation magazine, it was surprisingly popular for a role-playing game, contributing to the genre's growing popularity in the West. Next Generation reported in 1996 that the game had sold more than 500,000 copies in the United States alone. According to Square Enix, Secret of Mana had shipped 1.83 million copies worldwide as of 2003, with 1.5 million shipped in Japan and 330,000 abroad.

=== Contemporary reviews ===
Contemporary reception

Review scores
| Publication | Score |
|---|---|
| Dragon | 5/5 |
| Edge | 9/10 |
| Electronic Gaming Monthly | 8/10, 9/10, 9/10, 9/10 |
| Famitsu | 9/10, 9/10, 8/10, 7/10 |
| GameFan | 363/400 |
| Official Nintendo Magazine | 93% |

Electronic Gaming Monthly magazine's reviewers heavily praised the graphics, music, and multiplayer gameplay, saying that it had "some of the best music I've ever heard from a cartridge". They hoped that other companies would take the game's lead in adding multiplayer modes to role-playing games. Diehard GameFan's review of the game named the multiplayer as the game's best component, with reviewer Kelly Rickards saying that while the graphics were nice, the multiplayer "made the game". GamePro's review praised the graphics, plot, "first-rate gameplay" and "positively massive" world "dwarfing even Zelda", while stating the gameplay and multiplayer were "rough around the edges", concluding it to be "one of the finest action/RPGs" on the SNES. Nintendo Power said that it has "beautiful graphics and great depth of play" but criticized the "unnecessarily long" sword powering-up and "awkward" item selection method. SNES Force magazine praised the game's "superb" graphics, "fantastic" sounds and "revolutionary three-player mode".

Secret of Mana was awarded Game of the Month in December 1993 and Best Role-Playing Game of 1993 by Electronic Gaming Monthly. In its annual Megawards, GameFan awarded it Best Action/RPG (SNES). GamePro gave it the award for Role-Playing Game of the Year, ahead of Lufia and Shadowrun as runners-up.

Edge's review said that Secret of Mana was better than contemporary role-playing games Ys I & II, The Legend of Zelda: A Link to the Past, and Landstalker: The Treasures of King Nole. The review stated that Secret of Mana "includes some of the best game design and features ever seen: simultaneous three-player action, the best combat system ever designed, the best player interface ever designed, a superb control system, and yes, some of the most engrossing and rewarding gameplay yet". They concluded that the game was one of the best action RPGs or adventure games. Game designer Sandy Petersen reviewed the game in Dragon, and described the game as much like Zelda but with conventional role-playing game features. He predicted that the game would be regarded as a classic. Peterson concluded that Secret of Mana was one of the best SNES role-playing games and that it was "a much larger game than Zelda, with many more types of monsters, character options, and fortresses to explore". Nintendo Magazine System also compared it favorably with A Link to the Past; one reviewer stated that "even the magnificence of Zelda III seems stale in comparison to the incredible features found within this refreshing, exhilarating adventure" while the other stated that it "comes the closest yet" to surpassing Zelda, concluding that Secret of Mana was "one of the greatest graphical RPGs in the history of the world".

Computer and Video Games said in 1994 that Mana was "doing for adventure games now what Zelda did several years ago" and that Mana is "one of the best games for the SNES this year and more playable than" Donkey Kong Country. Next Generation said in 1996 that many players considered it "the RPG equivalent of Lord of the Rings."

=== Later reviews ===
Retrospective reception

Aggregate scores
| Aggregator | Score |
|---|---|
| GameRankings | 87% (SNES) |
| Metacritic | 80/100 (iOS); 63/100 (PS4) |

Review scores
| Publication | Score |
|---|---|
| Eurogamer | 9/10 (Wii) |
| Game Informer | 9.25/10 (SNES) |
| IGN | 9/10 (Wii) |
| Official Nintendo Magazine | 92% (Wii) |
| RPGFan | 90% (SNES) |
| Slide to Play | 4/4 (iOS) |

In 2008, Lucas Thomas of IGN reviewed the Virtual Console release of Secret of Mana and stated that it was considered one of the best video games ever made. Eurogamer's Dan Whitehead described it as "essential" and as the formative game of the Mana series. The iOS version of the game was praised by Nadia Oxford of Slide to Play for its improved graphics and computer-controlled characters. She also praised the quality of the touch controls relative to other role-playing game phone versions, though she disliked that the multiplayer mode had been removed. In 2014, Edge magazine described Secret of Mana as "one of the high points of the 16bit era". A writer for the magazine noted that, 20 years after Secret of Mana's release, its reputation as a SNES action RPG had been surpassed only by that of The Legend of Zelda: A Link to the Past.

The 2018 remake saw "mixed or average" reviews according to review aggregation website Metacritic, with the PS4 version scoring 63 out of 100 based on 60 reviews, while the PC version was scored 57 out of 100 based on six reviews. RPG Site's Zack Reese positively noted the attempts to modernise the gameplay while remaining faithful to the original, but felt people were better off playing the original due to its 3D presentation and lack of additional gameplay improvements. Meghan Sullvan of IGN described the game as "a charming but clumsy 20ish-hour adventure that both frustrates and delights", praising the artstyle but faulting a lack of improvements over the original. Game Informer's Kimberley Wallace did enjoy her time with the game but felt some of the adjustments did not improve the gameplay, further faulting poor voice acting and uneven musical remixes. Jeremy Parish, writing for Polygon, felt the remake compared poorly to the original's recent ports on Nintendo platforms, finding issues with its 3D redesign and repetitive character conversations. Chris Schilling of PC Gamer was particularly critical, saying the original appeared much smoother by comparison, disliking the new 3D graphics and faulting lack of noticeable adjustments to the pacing and difficulty.

=== Impact ===
Secret of Mana has placed on numerous top game lists since its release, and is the 13th highest-rate SNES game on aggregator website GameRankings. In 1995, Total! rated Secret of Mana 12th on their "Top 100 SNES Games of All Time," with Super Play ranked it eighth on its list of the best 100 SNES games of all time the following year. It has continued to be placed on "best of" lists of SNES games, games for Nintendo consoles, or role-playing ever since, including ones by Nintendo Power, IGN, Famitsu, Official Nintendo Magazine, Game Informer, 1Up.com, Polygon, and Time Extension, as recently as 2023.

In 2006, Level magazine claimed that Secret of Mana's rocky development was Square's main inspiration to move their games, such as the Final Fantasy series, from Nintendo consoles to Sony consoles in 1996. Secret of Mana was an influential game in its time, and its influence continued into the 2010s. Elements such as its radial ring menu system, described by Edge as "oft-mimicked", were borrowed by later games such as The Temple of Elemental Evil. Its cooperative multiplayer gameplay has been mentioned as an influence on Dungeon Siege III.
