= Final Fantasy IV: The Complete Collection =

- North American box art
- Developers: Square Enix; Bullets
- Publisher: Square Enix
- Director: Yoichi Yoshimoto
- Producer: Hiroyuki Miura
- Designer: Takashi Tokita
- Artist: Yoshitaka Amano
- Writer: Takashi Tokita
- Composers: Nobuo Uematsu; Junya Nakano; Masashi Hamauzu
- Series: Final Fantasy
- Platform: PlayStation Portable
- Release: JP: March 24, 2011; NA: April 19, 2011; PAL: April 22, 2011
- Genre: Role-playing
- Mode: Single-player

Final Fantasy IV: The Complete Collection (Note: Japanese: ファイナルファンタジーIV コンプリートコレクション, Hepburn: Fainaru fantajī IV konpurīto korekushon) is a 2011 role-playing video game compilation co-developed by Square Enix and Bullets and published by Square Enix for the PlayStation Portable. The collection consists of enhanced ports of Final Fantasy IV (1991) and Final Fantasy IV: The After Years (2008), as well as a new scenario called Final Fantasy IV Interlude, which is set between the two games. It was released in Japan on March 24, 2011, before being released to other markets in April. It was also released as digital download.

== Content ==
The compilation was supervised by Takashi Tokita. It features 16:9 high-resolution graphics, the same CG opening movie from the Nintendo DS remake of Final Fantasy IV, a new CG opening for Final Fantasy IV: The After Years, a new soundtrack arrangement, and a gallery mode for viewing CG movies and Yoshitaka Amano's artwork.

In Japan, a collector's bundle called the "Ultimate Pack" was also released, featuring a game guide, an art book called Final Fantasy IV Complete Arts, and a seventeen-track CD called Final Fantasy IV: The After Years Sounds Plus, whose final five tracks were selected by polling the members of the Japanese Square Enix community website.

== Plot ==
The compilation features the full versions of Final Fantasy IV Advance and Final Fantasy IV: The After Years, along with a new game titled Final Fantasy IV Interlude, which is set roughly one year after the original game.

A battle from Final Fantasy IV Interlude, a new scenario included with The Complete Collection.

In Interlude, players take control of Cecil. The story begins at Baron Castle after Cecil has a dream about one of the Crystal Chambers, where he sees Rydia and hears a voice saying "Finally, it has a new form". Just as the voice is about to reveal itself, Rosa wakes him. Cecil and Rosa set off on one of the Red Wings airships for Damcyan. Meanwhile, at the Feymarch, Rydia is about to leave when confronted by Asura, Queen of the Feymarch, who asks her where she is going. Rydia tells her she is headed to Damcyan for its reconstruction celebration, and Asura lets her pass.

While at the celebration, a guard enters and tells Yang that some monks have been brutally attacked at Mt. Hobbs. Hearing this, Yang decides to leave, and Cecil and Rosa volunteer to join him. When they reach the summit of Mt. Hobbs, they find two injured monks, whom Rosa heals. Soon after, they are attacked by a Dad Bomb. When they defeat the Dad Bomb they head to Fabul where Yang's wife Sheila is about to give birth to Ursula. Yang asks Cecil to be Ursula's godfather, which he gladly accepts.

As Cecil and Rosa are about to leave they encounter Cid, Luca, Palom and Porom, who tell Cecil a swarm of monsters have emerged from the Sealed Cave. As they are about to take off, Cecil tells Yang to stay with his family. Cid notices Rosa looks pale and Cecil asks Yang to take care of her while he is away. Once they arrive at the Sealed Cave, they see the Tower of Babel pulse with light. Edge notices this from Eblan and sets off to enter the Tower through the underground passageway. Once Cecil and the others reach the Crystal Chamber they are attacked by a Demon Wall and narrowly defeat it. In the Crystal Chamber, they encounter Rydia. However, she can't remember where she was, but she says that "they" were calling her. While everyone wonders exactly who "they" are, the party decides to go to the Tower of Babel and investigate.

While they are scaling the tower, Rydia begins regaining her summons and acting more strangely. As they pass the cannon control room, Rydia enters it and three guards come out to stop Cecil and the others from following her. The three guards merge into a Deus Ex Mechina, at which point Edge arrives to lend a hand in defeating it. After the sentry is destroyed, the party heads into the control room, but Rydia is nowhere to be found. They decide to search for her and keep going up the tower only to learn that she is an impostor, as she attacks them with the Eidolons she has obtained. When the fake Rydia summons Bahamut, the real Rydia appears and dissuades him from attacking the party. Although they defeat the fake Rydia, she escapes and reports to her "creator" residing in the True Moon, that the Eidolon project is complete. Back on earth, in Cecil's bed chamber, Rosa lies in bed and Cecil asks if she is alright. It is then revealed that Rosa is pregnant. Everyone is overjoyed with the news and they tell Cecil that he should start coming up with some names.

Meanwhile, on Mt. Ordeals, Kain, who is still repenting for the wrongs he did during Final Fantasy IV, hears a voice call out to him.

== Reception ==
Reception

Aggregate score
Aggregator	Score
Metacritic	77/100

Review scores
Publication	Score
1Up.com	B−
Famitsu	8/10, 7/10, 7/10, 8/10
Game Informer	8.5 / 10
GameTrailers	8.5 / 10
IGN	9.0 / 10
RPGFan	85%

The collection sold over 198,000 copies in Japan by the end of 2011. It has received mostly positive reviews. Famitsu gave it 30 out of 40 from a panel of four reviewers. IGN gave it 9 out of 10, and recommended to players who have not played the original game. 1UP.com rated the collection a B−, describing the original game as a "masterpiece" but referring to its follow-ups as "a pale imitation".

GameZone was less impressed, giving the collection 4.5 out of 10, stating that "this Complete Collection is a hard one to recommend" as a package, and that its selling point, The After Years, "isn't any great shakes as a story, and the high-res makeover gives it some of the same visual hang-ups as the central quest".

== See also ==
- List of Square Enix video game franchises
