= FF4 =

FF4 may refer to:

- Final Fantasy IV, a console role-playing game originally released in 1991 for the Super NES
- Final Fantasy IV (2007 video game), an enhanced 3D remake of the 1991 role-playing game originally released for the Nintendo DS
- Fatal Frame: Mask of the Lunar Eclipse, a 2008 survival horror game for the Wii
- Fast & Furious 4, a 2009 film
- Mozilla Firefox 4, a web browser
