= Characters of Final Fantasy IV and The After Years =

Illustration by Airi Yoshioka featuring Cecil in the middle alongside Rosa (left), Kain (right) as well as other playable characters featured in Final Fantasy IV.

Final Fantasy IV, a role-playing video game released by Square in 1991, revolves around Cecil Harvey, a knight of Baron who embarks on a quest to defeat Golbez, a man that is controlling the king of Baron. During Cecil's quest, he is joined by his childhood friends Kain Highwind and Rosa Farrell, as well as other warriors from around the world who also seek to stop Golbez. The visuals of the characters were designed by Yoshitaka Amano. After its initial release, Final Fantasy IV was later ported to multiple consoles. In 2007, Square Enix released an enhanced remake for the Nintendo DS that added voice acting to both the Japanese and English versions.

The game's 2008 sequel, Final Fantasy IV: The After Years is set seventeen years after Final Fantasy IV and includes most of the characters from the original game as well as introducing several new characters. The story of The After Years primarily revolves around Ceodore Harvey, the son of Cecil and Rosa. In 2011, a third game in the series was released. Set one year after Final Fantasy IV and sixteen years prior to The After Years, Final Fantasy IV Interlude, was released for the PlayStation Portable, and featured several of the original Final Fantasy IV protagonists.

As Final Fantasy IV was the first game in the series on the Super Famicom, character designer Yoshitaka Amano took advantage of the console's graphical capabilities, designing much more elaborate characters than prior entries. Lead designer Takashi Tokita noted how he and the staff worked in making all of the game's cast fit into the story. The characters were well received by video game publications with several of them finding the cast innovative thanks to their characterization.

== Concept and creation ==
According to Final Fantasy IV lead designer Takashi Tokita, Final Fantasy IV was the first Japanese role-playing game to feature such "deep characters". The graphical capabilities of the Super Famicom allowed character designer Yoshitaka Amano to create more elaborate designs than he had done for previous games released for the Famicom. Tokita stated that although his inexperience may have hurt the story, the characters' personalities and roles made the story more appealing. Tokita also pointed out the variety of characters helped to appeal to a wider demographic, stating that the team worked hard to make all side characters fit into the story, something that, at the time, was difficult to do in Japanese media. For the Nintendo DS remake, the characters were handled by Airi Yoshioka. In Final Fantasy IV: The After Years, the characters were designed by Akira Oguro.

Tokita stated that the inclusion of voice actors in the DS remake was pleasing for him, claiming that the voice-overs "allowed for a much more dramatic localization". The Japanese voice actors reflected Tokita's vision of the characters, but he noted that others did not feel the same way. English translator Tom Slattery had to change various parts of the original script for the voiced scenes in order for the characters' mouth movements to match the words they were speaking.

== Playable characters ==
=== Cecil Harvey ===
Cecil Harvey (セシル・ハーヴィ, Seshiru Hāvi) is the protagonist of Final Fantasy IV and Interlude and a major character in The After Years. He was raised by the King of Baron to become a Dark Knight. Although Cecil is reluctant to master the Dark Sword, he excels as a Dark Knight and is eventually promoted to the command of Baron's airship fleet, the "Red Wings". When the King orders Cecil to rob the magical town of Mysidia of its Water Crystal at the cost of killing innocent people, Cecil begins to question the king's morality. After the King tricks him into bombing the village of Mist, Cecil openly rebels and forms an alliance of warriors to oppose Baron. His first recruit is Rydia, a child he rescues from Mist. During his quest, he becomes a Paladin by climbing Mt. Ordeals and overcoming the darkness in his heart. This represents one of the game's themes; "brute strength alone isn't power", as when he becomes a Paladin, Cecil's power actually decreases, although he gradually becomes more powerful than he ever was as a Dark Knight. Cecil reaches Baron and learns that the new leader of the Red Wings is a man named Golbez, and that Golbez's minion, Cagnazzo, had killed and impersonated the king. With his companions, Cecil is able to defeat Cagnazzo but Golbez continues to hunt for the Crystals and Cecil must continue his quest. He ultimately learns that he is the son of a Lunarian, Kluya, and that Golbez is his brother. Golbez himself is not evil, but is being controlled by Zemus, a Lunarian who wants to wipe out all life on the Blue Planet. Although Cecil initially cannot accept that Golbez is innocent, he later forgives him, acknowledging him as his brother after Zemus' defeat. Cecil then returns to Baron, marries with Rosa, and becomes the new King of Baron.

Interlude depicts Cecil investigating the unexplained appearance of multiple monsters one year after the events of Final Fantasy IV. The game ends with Cecil discovering that Rosa is pregnant. Sixteen years later, in The After Years, Cecil and Rosa have a son named Ceodore. During an invasion of Baron, Cecil is defeated and possessed by the summoner Maenad, and his friends are forced to fight him to free him from the Maenad's control, though Cecil is left weakened afterwards. After he joins them, they travel to the True Moon and encounter the incarnation of Cecil's negative emotions, the Dark Knight, who seeks to become the real Cecil and take revenge against Golbez for abandoning him when they were young. With the help of his family Golbez, Rosa, and Ceodore, Cecil is able to make peace with his dark half and regain his full strength.

Cecil has also been featured in the fighting games Dissidia Final Fantasy, Dissidia 012 and Dissidia NT where he uses both his Dark Knight and Paladin forms. He also appears in the rhythm game Theatrhythm Final Fantasy and its sequel, Curtain Call, as the main character representing Final Fantasy IV. He is voiced by Shizuma Hodoshima in Japanese and Yuri Lowenthal in English. Cecil also appears in Secret of Evermore as a weapons dealer and makes several references to Final Fantasy IV, including being king of Baron Castle, his wife Rosa, his battle with Zeromus, his being a paladin, and his adventures on the moon.

=== Kain Highwind ===
Voiced by (English): Liam O'Brien
Voiced by (Japanese): Kōichi Yamadera

Kain Highwind (カイン・ハイウィンド, Kain Haiwindo; "Cain Highwind" in the Japanese version) is the leader of the Dragoon Knights of Baron as well as childhood friend of both Cecil and Rosa. He claims that being a dragoon makes him feel closer to his father, who died when he was very young. Although best friends with Cecil, Kain is in love with Rosa and must deal with his jealousy throughout the story. Like Cecil, Kain notices the King of Baron's unusually harsh behavior, but he is under the mind-control of Golbez, and thus becomes Cecil's enemy. Kain eventually breaks free of Golbez's control after Tellah weakens Golbez. At this point, Kain joins Cecil's group in their efforts to defeat Golbez. However, after Cecil claims the last Dark Crystal, Golbez resumes his control of Kain. When Zemus' mind-control of Golbez breaks, Kain is released and helps Cecil's group destroy Zemus. After the final battle Kain is overcome with remorse for his actions, and decides that he must atone on Mt. Ordeals before he can rejoin his friends permanently.

At the end of Interlude, Kain, who is still living on Mt. Ordeals hears a mysterious voice calling to him. He reappears in The After Years as the "Hooded Man" (謎の男, Nazo no Otoko), assisting Ceodore while hiding his real identity. He is impersonated by the incarnation of his negative emotions, Dark Kain (ダークカイン, Dāku Kain), who wishes to kill Cecil and have Rosa for himself. Kain defeats his dark alter-ego and merges with him, causing Kain to become a Holy Dragoon. After helping his friends to destroy the True Moon, Kain returns to Baron to assume command of the Red Wings.

Kain has also been featured in Dissidia 012 Final Fantasy and Dissidia Final Fantasy NT as a playable character, as producer Tetsuya Nomura wished to add him to the fighting game.

=== Rosa Farrell ===
Voiced by (English): Karen Strassman
Voiced by (Japanese): Yuhko Kaida

In Final Fantasy IV, Rosa Farrell (ローザ・ファレル, Rōza Fareru) is the childhood friend of and love interest for Cecil. She is a white mage and archer. Experienced in healing magic, Rosa is often busy attending to Baronian soldiers who have been wounded in battle. When Rosa learns that Cecil was sent to Mist with a bomb ring, she immediately leaves Baron in search of him, but contracts desert fever. Cecil cures her, and she joins his party. During the battle of Fabul, she attempts to save Cecil from Kain, but Golbez kidnaps her and demands the Earth Crystal for her safe return. Cecil brings the Crystal but when the party meets Golbez a fight erupts. Tellah wounds Golbez with the forbidden spell Meteor, but dies in the process and the party is left at the mercy of a wounded Golbez. He is about to slay Cecil but stops and flees. Afterwards, Cecil saves Rosa, and she helps them defeat the Lord of Wind, Barbariccia. Immediately after this, Rosa uses her magic to teleport them out of the unstable tower and she remains in the party for the rest of the game. At the end of the game, she marries Cecil and becomes the Queen of Baron.

After marrying Cecil, Rosa has a son named Ceodore; her pregnancy causes her absence from most of Interlude. In The After Years, she is kidnapped by Kain's dark self. Once back to safety, Rosa joins her old friends as they fight to save their world from the threat of the True Moon. During the encounter with the Dark Knight, Rosa intervenes when he attempts to murder Golbez, and the two of them battle the Dark Knight by themselves and later with Ceodore until Cecil is able to end the battle himself.

=== Rydia ===
Rydia of Mist (ミストのリディア, Misuto no Ridia) is a powerful summoner. When Cecil and Kain travel through the Mist Cave to reach Mist, they kill the Mist Dragon that was summoned to protect the village. As Eidolons are directly linked to their Summoner, Cecil and Kain inadvertently kill Rydia's mother in the process. They also set the entire village on fire by inadvertently releasing a Bomb Ring. Rydia becomes enraged when she learns of their actions, using Titan to cause an earthquake that separates them, but injuring herself in the process. Cecil takes her to Kaipo, and when she regains her senses, she initially cannot forgive him, although she does agree to join him after he defends her from some Baron soldiers. Later, Rydia is swallowed by the Eidolon Leviathan and taken to the Feymarch, the Land of the Eidolons which Leviathan rules alongside his Queen, Ashura. Due to the different flow of time in the Feymarch, she physically matures during her stay despite being gone only a short time in the real world. Having mastered summoning and black magic at the expense of white magic, she saves Cecil from Golbez's Shadow Dragon in the Dwarven Castle's Crystal Room and rejoins the party for the rest of the story. At the end of the game, she returns to the Land of Eidolons.

During Interlude, Rydia is impersonated by a mysterious summoner that attacks Cecil and his friends. The real Rydia appears near the end of the game, saving their lives. At the beginning of The After Years, Ashura teleports Rydia to the real world moments before the Maenad appears and turns Ashura and Leviathan into stone. After helping her old friends save the planet, Rydia decides to rebuild Mist with the cooperation of Cecil and others, and also becomes the adoptive mother of the child Maenad Cuore.

Rydia also appears in the rhythm game Theatrhythm Final Fantasy as a character representing Final Fantasy IV. She is voiced by Noriko Shitaya in Japanese and Caroline Macey in English.

=== Tellah ===
Voiced by (English): Doug Lee
Voiced by (Japanese): Gorō Naya

Tellah, known in the Japanese version of the game as Tella (テラ, Tera), was once the wisest sage in Mysidia and master of all spells. However, after a serious accident involving his magic, he retired to Kaipo, where he gave up sorcery and forgot most of his spells. He had a wife and daughter. When his wife died, and he learned of his daughter's secret engagement to Edward of Damcyan, he became furious. He left his home and traveled to Damcyan to confront Edward. Along the way, he meets and befriends Cecil and Rydia. Upon reaching Damcyan, he learns Anna, his daughter, has sacrificed her life to save Edward from Golbez. When Tellah learns how deeply Edward had cared for Anna, his anger towards him lessens and he vows to kill Golbez, leaving Cecil's group. During his quest, he realizes that his current powers are not enough to accomplish this goal, so he travels to Mt. Ordeals where his memories return and he regains his mastery over magic. He also learns the forbidden spell, Meteor. Rejoining Cecil to confront Golbez, Tellah casts Meteor. Doing so weakens Golbez, but it kills Tellah. In the final moments of his life, Tellah admits to Cecil that his thirst for vengeance had consumed him.

He briefly reappears as a spirit in The After Years, alongside Anna, advising Edward to not let his heart be weighed down by their deaths and encouraging him to come to Harley's aid.

=== Edward Chris von Muir ===
Voiced by (English): Sam Riegel
Voiced by (Japanese): Ryō Horikawa

Edward Chris von Muir, known in the Japanese version of the game as Gilbart Chris von Muir (ギルバート・クリス・フォン・ミューア, Girubāto Kurisu fon Myūa), is the prince of Damcyan, soon to become the seventh king of the region. Edward grew up very mild-mannered. Although expected to become an expert in business, Edward showed much more interest in music and became a bard. When Golbez's Red Wings attack Damcyan and kill his beloved Anna, Edward joins Cecil's group in their fight against Golbez. He falls overboard when Leviathan attacks Cecil's ship on the way to Baron, and is tended to in Troia. From his room, he plays the Twin Harp, sending out a melody which aids Cecil's group in defeating the Dark Elf. He joins the airship fleet against the Giant of Babel, and helps to rebuild Damcyan after Zemus' defeat, ultimately becoming its king.

In The After Years, he is an active member of the group who attempts to maintain the peace, but is able to recognize that all is not right in the world due to the Maenad. He is still plagued by the deaths of Anna and Tellah, but is able to move on when their spirits encourage him to find someone else to love as he did Anna.

=== Yang Fang Leiden ===
Voiced by (English): Dan Woren
Voiced by (Japanese): Tesshō Genda

The composed leader of the monks of Fabul, Yang Fang Leiden (ヤン・ファン・ライデン, Yan Fan Raiden) is an undisputed expert in martial arts. When training on Mt. Hobs, he and his fellow monks are attacked by a group of monsters. Yang emerges as the only survivor, and returns to Fabul with Cecil's group, who help him to defend the city from Golbez's attack. He finds his way to Baron after Leviathan attacks the party's ship, losing his memories and attacking Cecil before coming to his senses. In the Tower of Babel's cannon room, he sacrifices himself to prevent the cannon from destroying the dwarven tanks, but resurfaces in the Sylvan cave, unconscious. He wakes up when the party strikes him with a frying pan (given to them by his wife Sheila). After the ultimate victory over Zemus, Yang becomes king of Fabul.

In Interlude, Yang investigates incidents caused by monsters one year after becoming the king of Fabul. In The After Years, he spends much of his time arguing with his daughter, Ursula, but is still a valued ally and friend.

=== Palom and Porom ===
Voiced by (English): (Palom) Megan Harvey (Porom) Hunter MacKenzie Austin.
Voiced by (Japanese): Rie Kugimiya

Palom (パロム, Paromu) and Porom (ポロム, Poromu) are twin mages from Mysidia. Palom is a rowdy, immature and rude young boy who is a Black Mage, while Porom is his sweet, polite, and mature older sister who is a White Mage. Though the twins are only five years old, they are experts in their respective magic skills and are sent by the Elder of Mysidia to help Cecil on his journey to the top of Mt. Ordeals. However, they are really acting as spies for the Elder, who does not yet trust Cecil. Following Cecil's trial and his transformation into a Paladin, Porom and Palom decide to join his group. They turn themselves to stone to save Cecil and his friends from being crushed in Cagnazzo's trap. The Elder later releases them, and they assist the efforts against the Giant of Babel and ultimately help in the defeat of Zemus. They later resume their studies in Mysidia, with Porom working to rein in Palom, who aspires to become as great as Tellah.

Palom and Porom are major characters in Interlude: they join Cecil's party at Mount Hobs along with Cid and stay there until the end of the story. In The After Years, Palom is sent on a mission to Troia to train a replacement Epopt, Leonora. However, with Porom now helping the elders preserving Mysidia's laws, a wedge is driven between them. Over the course of the game, they come to realize that despite the fact they dislike and get on one another's nerves, they need each other, and are at their best when together.

=== Cid Pollendina ===
Voiced by (English): John Snyder
Voiced by (Japanese): Ichirō Nagai

The chief engineer of Baron, Cid Pollendina (シド・ポレンディーナ, Shido Porendīna) is friend of Cecil, Kain, and Rosa. He lives in the town of Baron with his daughter, who often scolds him for his workaholic behavior. Since the loss of his wife, Cid has treated Cecil like his own son. Having discovered the ancient skill of levitation, Cid is credited with inventing the airship. After discovering that Cecil has been relieved of his position in Baron's fleet, Cid is locked away in the dungeon by Cagnazzo. After Cagnazzo is defeated, Cid escapes and gives Cecil access to his special airship, the Enterprise. When the Enterprise crashes in the Underworld, Cid takes it back to the surface to outfit it with Mythril, which enables it to fly over magma. He rescues Cecil from the collapsing bridge to the Tower of Babel, and attempts to escape a pursuing Red Wings airship. He ultimately jumps off the ship and detonates explosives to seal the Underworld. He is thought to have been killed, but he returns to add Mythril and a drill to the newly acquired airship, the Falcon, which he deploys against the Giant of Babel.

In The After Years, Cid is still Baron's airship engineer, having refused to retire. He has taken on Luca, daughter of the King of Dwarves, as his apprentice. He eagerly joins the battle for the Blue Planet, his age not slowing down his enthusiasm.

=== Edge ===
Voiced by (English): Taliesin Jaffe
Voiced by (Japanese): Hiroya Ishimaru

Edward Geraldine (エドワード・ジェラルダイン, Edowādo Jerarudain), primarily called by his nickname Edge (エッジ, Ejji), is the royal prince of Eblan, only heir to the throne and a skilled ninja. Though often cocky, impulsive and overconfident, he is a righteous young man who is not easily manipulated or led astray. Cecil's group first meets Edge in Eblan Cave, after he has been defeated in battle by the Lord of Fire, Rubicante. Because Cecil and the rest are after Rubicante as well, Edge joins the party and leads them into the Tower of Babel. However, he is made to watch helplessly as his parents, whom Dr. Lugae has abducted and turned into demons, sacrifice themselves rather than be forced to kill him. He stays with the party throughout the game. Following Zemus' defeat, Edge returns to Eblan.

By the time of The After Years, Edge has proven to be a kind-hearted and popular king, making efforts to aid in the reconstruction of Eblan and Mist and to defend the Blue Planet from the invasion of the True Moon.

=== Fusoya ===
Voiced by (English): Michael McConnohie
Voiced by (Japanese): Banjō Ginga

Fusoya, known in the Japanese version of the game as Fusuya (フースーヤ, Fūsūya) and FuSoYa in earlier versions of the game, is a Lunarian, and a resident of the moon. He watches over the other Lunarians in their long sleep and knows the true origins of Cecil, Golbez, the Crystals, and the real nature of the threat to the Blue Planet. Once Fusoya explains Golbez's innocence to Cecil, he joins the party to help defeat Zemus, returning to the planet just in time to fight the Giant of Babel. Inside the huge android, Fusoya dispels Zemus' mind control over Golbez, and the pair set off to fight Zemus at the core of the moon. While Fusoya and Golbez defeat Zemus' physical form easily, just as Cecil's group arrives Zemus transforms into Zeromus, a being formed from Zemus' intense hatred. Zeromus defeats Fusoya and Golbez, but is then vanquished by Cecil's group. Fusoya then returns to his sleep with Golbez and the rest of the Lunarians.

In The After Years, Fusoya works with Golbez to investigate the arrival of the Maenads, but he is forced to send Golbez away to the Blue Planet while he defends the moon from the revived Zeromus. His fate is left unrevealed.

== Antagonists ==
=== Golbez ===
Voiced by (English): Peter Beckman (3D remake), Joseph Capp (Final Fantasy XIV)
Voiced by (Japanese): Takeshi Kaga (3D remake), Takanori Hoshino (Final Fantasy XIV)

Golbez (ゴルベーザ, Gorubēza) is a sorcerer who pursues the Crystals around the world using Baron's forces, attacking multiple innocent people in the process. In reality, he is Cecil's older brother Theodor (セオドール, Seodōru) who has been under the control of Zemus from the day his parents died; his father beaten by the people he tried to help and his mother dying after giving birth to Cecil. Taking Cecil's place as the captain of the Red Wings, Golbez is a powerful opponent who serves as the main antagonist for the majority of the game. Seemingly affiliated with King Baron, Golbez brainwashes Kain to assist him. Upon recovering his true self while fighting Fusoya, he attempts to defeat Zemus, but fails. Once Cecil's group defeats Zemus, lacking the heart to return to the Blue Planet with the others, Golbez decides to remain on the moon with the Lunarians.

Golbez returns in The After Years. In his own storyline, he and Fusoya investigate the arrival of the Maenads, who shatter the moon's crystals and in doing so revive Zeromus. Fusoya sends Golbez down to the Blue Planet as he continues to fight Zeromus alone, and Golbez, under the identity of the "Man in Black" (黒衣の男, Kokui no Otoko), joins Rydia to help her save her friends. Later in the True Moon, Golbez comes face-to-face with Cecil's alter ego the Dark Knight, who desires Golbez killed for both nearly destroying the world and abandoning his brother. With help from Rosa and Ceodore, Golbez stands up to his past sins and begs for forgiveness, allowing Cecil to regain his own strength and banish his dark half. Should Golbez survive, he remains with the party until the end of the game, at which point he returns to the moon in hopes that Fusoya or anybody else is still alive.

He has also been featured in all three Dissidia Final Fantasy titles as a playable character. According to Takashi Tokita, one of the writers for Final Fantasy IV, Golbez was created as an homage to the Star Wars saga villain Darth Vader.

Golbez appears as the main antagonist of the patches storyline of Final Fantasy XIV: Endwalker, first appearing in Endwalker's 6.1 patch Newfound Adventure. This version of Golbez is designed similar to Final Fantasy IV and is depicted as a resident of the Thirteenth shard, now a desolate wasteland known as the Void thanks to the machinations of the Ascians. Originally a memoriate named Durante, he and his companion Golbez hailed from the kingdom of Baron seeking to end the Contramemoria. At some point, they meet Zero who declines their offer of working towards a common goal. Golbez became corrupted by Darkness and Durante was forced to kill and seal him in a memoria crystal, with Durante taking his name and armor, promising that the denizens of his world would sing of his heroism. In his despair, the Ascian Igeyorhm approached Golbez, manipulating him into killing the Watcher on the Thirteenth's moon and unleashing the Flood of Darkness.

Having abducted the great wyrm Azdaja, his four archfiends were given part of her aether in exchange for serving Golbez. They agonized in the wasteland of their homeworld, as the overabundance of darkness prevents them dying and then resting in the aetherial sea. Tired of the deathless life on the Thirteenth, Golbez plotted to invade the Source with his voidsent, which would allow them to perish at the cost of triggering an Umbral Calamity, meaning the Thirteenth would be absorbed into the Source, and all life on the latter would perish.

Golbez's plans are interrupted by the emergence of the Scions of the Seventh Dawn, who had come with Azdaja's brother Vrtra to search for his sister. After the deaths of Scarmiglione and Barbariccia at the hands of the Warrior of Light, Golbez sends his remaining two archfiends after the Scions to prevent them from returning to the Thirteenth. At the cost of their lives, Rubicante and Cagnazzo succeeded destroying the Scions' route to the Thirteenth. After finding an alternate route to the Thirteenth's moon, Vrtra and the Scions confronted Golbez, who proceeded to transform her in a voidsent. The Warrior of Light battled Golbez and Azdaja, defeating them, but could not stop Golbez from fusing Azdaja with Zodiark's aether on the moon. This created an extremely powerful voidsent named "Zeromus", forcing the Scions to flee. Golbez waited for Zeromus to gather its full strength, ready to set the final stages of his plan in motion. With Light from the First to reach Golbez's domain, the Scions return and learn of his past as Durante, with Zero convincing him to help stop Zeromus and save Azdaja by rekindling his trust in others. In the aftermath, Zero remains with Golbez to help restore balance to the Thirteenth.

Golbez returns in the final story patch cycle for Dawntrail, where he and Zero assist the Warrior of Light in stopping an invasion of the Source by another voidsent, Enuo. In the aftermath, he shares concerns with the Warrior that the barriers between the shards and the Source are weakening which allowed Enuo to invade the Source, while Zero reveals that since they last saw the Warrior, they have recruited other like-minded voidsent to their cause while continuing to use the excess Light from the First to restore the Thirteenth's balance, though Golbez keeps his distance from others out of guilt for his actions in Endwalker.

=== Zemus ===
Zemus (ゼムス, Zemusu) is the mastermind behind Golbez's actions in Final Fantasy IV. Wishing to destroy the planet, he manipulates Golbez into carrying out his will in hunting down the Crystals. Fusoya reveals that Zemus is the only Lunarian who refused to go into stasis until the time when Lunarians and Earthlings could live in harmony. Even though Golbez and Fusoya seemingly vanquish him, Zemus comes back to life as Zeromus (ゼロムス, Zeromusu), the monstrous embodiment of his hatred and evil. Cecil and his friends use a Crystal to reveal the true shape of Zeromus, and manage to slay him.

Zeromus returns in The After Years as Zeromus' Malice, which the Maenads unleash on the Lunarian's Moon by shattering the Crystals there. Fusoya and Golbez attempt to stop Zeromus, but he proves too strong and Fusoya is forced to send Golbez to the Blue Planet alone in order to protect it from the Maenads. The final fate of Fusoya and Zeromus is left unrevealed.

A different version of Zeromus is fought in the Easytype version of Final Fantasy IV, with a different graphics and attacks. It later appears in the Game Boy Advance and PlayStation Portable versions as the final boss of the new Lunar Ruins dungeon, named Zeromus EG. Zeromus is also an optional esper in Final Fantasy XII, combining the Zeromus and Zeromus EG designs. He is voiced by Ryō Horikawa.

Another version of Zeromus appears in the patches storyline of Final Fantasy XIV: Endwalker. Golbez, seeking to break the barrier between the Thirteenth and the Source, fused the Great Wyrm Azdaja with the remnants of the primal Zodiark's aether. This created an extremely powerful voidsent that Golbez named "Zeromus", after an ancient hero of the Thirteenth, and intended to use to fulfill his plans once Zeromus had finished gathering its full strength. Fueled by Azdaja's longing for home, Zeromus nearly shatters the barrier between the worlds, but is stopped by the Scions and a repentant Golbez, with Zero separating it from Azdaja and sealing it in a memoria crystal. In the aftermath, its crystal is given to Ryne in hopes that its Darkness can be used to restore the First.

=== Rubicante ===
Rubicante (ルビカンテ, Rubikante) (Rubicant in the original SNES release and PlayStation re-release) is the leader and strongest member of the Four Elemental Lords. The Lord of Fire, he is working with Dr. Lugae to raise the Giant of Babel, and is the archenemy of Edge. Cecil and Edge defeat Rubicante in the Tower of Babel and the Giant of Babel. Unlike the other Lords, he is very honorable, going so far as to heal Cecil's party before fighting them. He later advises Edge not to let his anger get the best of him, as it will merely blind him. He did not authorize Lugae's transformation of Edge's parents into monsters, and he apologizes to Edge for the deed before they fight. The party faces him again within the Giant of Babel.

Rubicante also appears in Final Fantasy: Dawn of Souls, in the final level of Hellfire Chasm. In The After Years, Rubicante is revived by the True Moons, in which he once again proves his honor to Cecil and his party. He is voiced by Norio Wakamoto.

He also appears in Final Fantasy XIV: Endwalker, appearing in Endwalker's 6.2 patch Buried Memory. As Golbez's archfiend, he witnesses the defeat of Scarmiglione and Barbariccia at the hands of the Warrior of Light, then promises to enact revenge alongside Cagnazzo. In patch 6.3 Gods Revel, Lands Tremble, Rubicante destroys the path the Warrior of Light had been using to enter the Void; the Warrior then battles and defeats Rubicante. His backstory in Endwalker was that he was a powerful mage who trained alongside another mage daily. One day while out hunting fiends attacking their village, a girl's mother that had become a fiend attacks the pair. The girl pleads for them not to kill her, and while distracted, the mage's partner is killed. The mage vanquishes the fiend using powerful fire magic and the girl dubs him Rubicante due to the red glow. The girl forgives him and he sets off to use his powers for good. He eventually meets and joins Golbez, vying to use his powers to restore his world, even if it means destroying the neighbouring one.

=== Barbariccia ===
Barbariccia (バルバリシア, Barubarishia) (Valvalis in the original SNES release and PlayStation re-release) is the only female member of the Four Elemental Lords. The Lord of Wind, Barbariccia can transform herself into an almost indestructible tornado. Cecil's party first defeat Barbariccia in the Tower of Zot, and again inside the Giant of Babel.

She also appears as an optional boss in Final Fantasy: Dawn of Souls on the final level of Hellfire Chasm, and is one of the revived Lords in The After Years. She is voiced by Yūko Kaida.

She also appears in Final Fantasy XIV: Endwalker, primarily appearing in Endwalker's 6.2 patch Buried Memory. She is dispatched by Golbez to defeat the Warrior of Light and their companions after he senses the death of Scarmiglione, but she too is defeated by the Warrior of Light in battle. Her backstory in Endwalker was that she was daughter to a nobleman who was kept her from seeing people she had interest in. On a night she snuck out to see those people, she instead found her father who revealed he had killed them all. Enraged, she bludgeoned him to death with a hatchet and embraced her new freedom becoming Barbariccia, where she would eventually meet and join Golbez.

=== Cagnazzo ===
Voiced by (English): Michael McConnohie
Voiced by (Japanese): Takeshi Aono

Cagnazzo (カイナッツォ, Kainattso) (Kainazzo in the original SNES release) is the Lord of Water. He is a large turtle demon with a humanoid face, hired by Golbez and Zemus. Cagnazzo killed King Baron and impersonated him. It was in fact Cagnazzo that ordered Cecil to steal the Water Crystal from Mysidia and bomb the village of Mist. He was also responsible for imprisoning Cid after he would not divulge the location of his hidden airship. The initial battle with Cagnazzo is fought in the throne room of Baron. His battle tactics primarily consists of drawing water around him to unleash a powerful tsunami, although when struck by lightning, Cagnazzo will retreat into his shell and attempt to restore his lost health. Upon his defeat, he attempts one final attempt at killing the party by crushing them between the walls of the antechamber to the King's throne room, but this is foiled by the sacrifice of Palom and Porom. He later joins the other Lords in a final battle against Cecil and his friends in the Giant of Babel.

He also appears in Dawn of Souls on the fifth level of Hellfire Chasm. In The After Years, he is revived inside the True Moon.

He also appears in Final Fantasy XIV: Endwalker, appearing in Endwalker's 6.2 patch Buried Memory. As Golbez's archfiend, he witnesses the defeat of Scarmiglione and Barbariccia at the hands of the Warrior of Light, then promises to enact revenge alongside Rubicante. In patch 6.3 Gods Revel, Lands Tremble, Cagnazzo is fought at the end of the Lapis Manalis dungeon where it is revealed he was a decoy to allow Rubicante to destroy the gate to The Void. His backstory in Endwalker is that he was once a fisherman that grew bored of living a dull life and threw himself into battle so he had purpose. Realising the battle made him feel more alive, he would become a feared warrior known as Cagnazzo, where he would eventually meet and join Golbez.

=== Scarmiglione ===
Voiced by (English): Dameon Clarke
Voiced by (Japanese): Konishi Ōnishi

Scarmiglione (スカルミリョーネ, Sukarumiryōne) (Milon in the original SNES release and PlayStation re-release) is the Lord of Earth who first meets Cecil's group on Mt. Ordeals. Scarmiglione first appears as a small cloaked figure. Though Cecil thinks that he has defeated Scarmiglione and his zombie minions, the Earth Lord soon transforms into a hunched, zombie-like beast, attacking the group from behind. Even though Cecil and his allies believe that Scarmiglione had been destroyed as he fell off a bridge at the summit of Mt. Ordeals, he faces the Lord once again in the Giant of Babel.

Both of his forms appear in Dawn of Souls on the fifth level of Hellfire Chasm and in The After Years as a revived guardian of the True Moon.

He also appears in Final Fantasy XIV: Endwalker, primarily appearing in Endwalker's 6.2 patch Buried Memory. Scarmiglione is battled by the Warrior of Light at the end of the Fell Court of Troia dungeon. Despite being seemingly vanquished, Scarmiglione later returns and again battles the Warrior of Light and their companions. This time however, using the power of their new ally Zero, Scarmiglione is vanquished for good. His backstory in Endwalker was that he once was Commander of a Garrison in the Contramemoria. But in a battle, rather than fight, he played dead and hid under rubble while his soldiers were slaughtered. Two other soldiers find him and furious at his cowardice, knock him unconscious. They bury him alive alongside the rest of the dead but during funeral rites for the fallen, the commander would rise from the ground and leave, being dubbed Scarmiglione, where he would eventually meet and join Golbez.

=== Dr. Lugae ===
Dr. Lugae is a mad scientist working for Rubicante. He is the self-proclaimed "brains behind Golbez's operation" and he turns Edge's parents into monsters even though Rubicante never gave him permission to do so. His bodyguard and master creation is Barnabas (バルナバ, Barunaba) (Balnab in the original SNES release). Should Barnabas become damaged enough to warrant the concern of Dr. Lugae, he will apply oil, and eventually mount the monster as a last resort, combining their powers. If Lugae is defeated before the player destroys Barnabas, then Barnabas will explode, damaging the party. Lugae later transforms into a cyborg-like creature with advanced weaponry.

He reappears in The After Years as a revived guardian of the True Moon.

Lugae appears in Final Fantasy XIV: Endwalker as a boss in the Tower of Babil. Like his original incarnation, Barnabas initially attacks him before warping away, and appears later as a cyborg. He later appears in the Hildibrand Manderville questline. Having survived his initial defeat, he sought to continue his work on artificial lifeforms, eventually taking interest in Hildibrand's near-invulnerability. He arranges a deal with a Hannish representative to bring the inspector's comatose body to him, but are stopped by his assistant Nashu and the player's Warrior of Light. After a dramatic awakening of Hildibrand's body, he destroys the scientist with his own shoulder-mounted missile, leaving only his head remaining.

Later, his head is stolen by a thief in Radz-at-Han. He kidnaps Nashu and demands the Warrior to come to the Tower of Babil in exchange for her freedom, only to be confronted by Hildibrand and his father Godbert in the Warrior's place. The doctor is then defeated by the father-son duo, freeing Nashu. Afterwards, his head is recovered and later taken to a secret meeting in Thavnair where he plotted with someone against the Warrior, later attacking them, but is defeated by Hildibrand and his friends and is sent flying.

=== Baigan ===
Baigan (ベイガン, Beigan) is a knight of Baron. He is a good friend of Cecil — although like Kain, he joins Golbez and the King in their army of evil. When the party sneaks into the seemingly vacant castle through the Watery Passage, he is the first apparently friendly face to greet them. However, the twins Palom and Porom smell "something fishy", and Baigan reveals his true self, telling the party that he was given the gift of his alternate form by Golbez. He is subsequently killed by Cecil's group.

He reappears in The After Years as a revived guardian of the True Moon.

== Other characters ==
=== Anna ===
Voiced by (English): Zarah Little
Voiced by (Japanese): Hitomi Akino

Anna (アンナ) is the daughter of Tellah and is engaged to Prince Edward of Damcyan. After the death of Anna's mother, Tellah became overly protective of Anna, in the hopes of never losing her. When he learns of Anna's elopement with Edward, Tellah becomes furious and sets out after her. In Baron's raid on Damcyan, Anna is killed saving Edward's life. Edward later meets Anna's spirit in Kaipo, where she assuages his fears.

=== Elder of Mysidia ===
The Elder of Mysidia is the trainer of Palom, Porom, and the other mages of the town. A friend of Tellah, the Elder orders Palom and Porom to spy on Cecil when he heads to Mt. Ordeals. When Cecil becomes a paladin, the Elder realizes he is trustworthy, and becomes his ally. Later, the Elder, along with Palom and Porom, directs the prayers of the world to Cecil before the final battle against Zeromus.

In The After Years, the Elder offers much advice to Porom before she leaves to join the fight for the Blue Planet.

=== King Baron ===
As both Cecil and Kain were orphaned at very young ages, King Baron took them in and raised them as his own. While he wished for both to become Dark Knights, Kain wanted to train as a Dragoon, like his father. King Baron is killed by Cagnazzo though his spirit remained trapped in a secret second throne room of Baron Castle. When it is released, he is reincarnated as the Eidolon, Odin.

=== King Giott ===
King Giott (ジオット王, Jiotto Ō), or King Giotto in the Japanese version, is the King of the Dwarves. Though the Enterprise gets caught in the crossfire between the Red Wings and Giott's tanks, the dwarves soon befriend Cecil and the rest of the party. King Giott provides much of the insight on the Dark Crystals of the Underworld. In all his kingdom, Giott's most prized treasure is his only child, his daughter Luca. After his wife's death, he gave his wife's necklace to Luca. The necklace is needed to open the Sealed Cavern, so Cecil and his party can stop Golbez from obtaining the final Dark Crystal.

He is voiced by Takeshi Aono.

A character who shares the same name as Giott appears in Final Fantasy XIV: Shadowbringers as a dwarven bounty hunter aiming to slay the sin eater Sophrosyne, who was created from the body of one of the First's Warriors of Light, Lamitt. Unlike his original appearance, this incarnation of Giott is female.

=== Luca ===
Luca is the daughter of King Giott and princess of the Dwarves. She created two mechanical dolls, Calca and Brina, which Golbez turns into a monster called Calcabrina that attacks the party. At first Luca seems untrusting of Cecil, but like the other dwarves, she learns to accept them. Under the rule of Luca and her father, the Dwarves help assist the party in their battles in the Underworld.

Luca is a playable character in The After Years. She is Cid's apprentice, mastering the skills of airship steering and maintenance, and joins the party in Rydia's chapter along with her two dolls.

She is voiced by Naomi Orikasa.

== Characters introduced in The After Years ==
=== Ceodore Harvey ===
Ceodore Harvey (セオドア・ハーヴィ, Seodoa Hāvi) is the protagonist of The After Years, the son of Cecil and Rosa, and the prince of Baron. He is an apprentice knight who has no confidence in himself, as he fears he will never be able to step out from the shadow of his parents. When his family disappears, Ceodore goes on a quest to find them and eventually joins forces with others to fight against the Maenad. He is trained in swords and lances, and can also tap into his inner energy to temporarily enhance his strength.

=== Ursula Fang Leiden ===
Ursula Fang Leiden is a supporting character in The After Years. She is Yang's daughter, a childhood friend of Ceodore, and his godsister. Unlike Ceodore, she takes great pride in being Yang's daughter and the princess of Fabul, and knows no better way of expressing this than by training as a monk herself, which frustrates her father greatly: the two often quarrel since Yang does not want her to be a monk. However, when he sees how she has developed, and that she understands what it means to be a monk, he gives in. Ursula continues to aid her friends as the battle for the Blue Planet leads them to the True Moon.

=== Leonora ===
Leonora is a supporting character in The After Years. She is an Epopt from the kingdom of Troia who is sent to be trained as a Sage. Palom is chosen as her teacher in Black Magic, and though Palom's brashness conflicts with Leonora's shyness, the two slowly begin to open up to each other. It is later revealed that Leonora had always looked up to Palom since she was a little girl listening to his stories about his adventures with Cecil, and their friendship grows stronger as they travel to the True Moon. Like Tellah in the previous game, Leonora can use both White and Black Magic, though she does not have the same strengths as those who specialize in one or the other.

=== The Eblan Four ===
The Eblan Four are a group of ninjas who serve under Edge: Gekkou, Izayoi, Tsukinowa, and Zangetsu. During the events of The After Years, Edge sends each of the four on a reconnaissance mission around the world before meeting up with them later in the storyline. Should any of the four die during their mission, they will not rejoin Edge and thus will not become party members during the final assault on the True Moon.

=== Harley ===
Harley is Edward's personal secretary and an aspiring scholar. In The After Years, Harley is first found investigating a meteor landing and is helped by Edward. Later, Harley is stricken by desert fever while she and Edward are traveling to Baron to meet with Cecil, and Edward is disheartened at his inability to protect anybody until the spirits of Anna and Tellah tell him to not grieve for his losses and to find what his heart truly wants. Encouraged, Edward retrieves a Sand Pearl to cure Harley, and she continues to aid Edward as they journey to the True Moon with the rest of the party.

Harley is briefly seen in Interlude as Edward's secretary-in-training.

=== Maenad ===
The Maenad, initially only known as the Mysterious Girl, is a strange being with summoner powers encountered in Interlude and The After Years. In the first of the two, she impersonates Rydia and causes trouble for Cecil and his friends. She is defeated by Cecil, Edge, Cid, Palom and Porom with the real Rydia's assistance but she escapes from them. In the second game, she first appears in Baron Castle where she defeats Cecil and brainwashes him. She later plays a cruel trick on Ceodore, forcing Cecil to fight him for her own amusement. She regards humans as lower life forms than herself and therefore has no qualms about hurting them physically or psychologically.

It is later revealed inside the True Moon that the Maenad is not a singular entity. There are many Maenads brought into being by the true antagonist of The After Years: The Creator. These beings were born to retrieve the Crystals for their father. It is implied that they also receive their summoning abilities from him, as their powers are not how a summoner's powers usually work: the Maenads overwrite the Code of the Eidolons by trapping them in another dimension and forcing them to serve their will, and by extension, The Creator's.

Before meeting the Creator, the party encounters a child Maenad who opens the passage to his chambers. When the Creator begins to destroy the True Moon after being defeated, the party rescues the child as they escape, and the other Maenads protect them from the Creator by stating "that child is our future". In the ending, it is revealed that Rydia has adopted the child Maenad and named her Cuore, and she is raising her with help from Edge and the Mist villagers.

=== The Creator ===
The Creator is the name given to the primary antagonist of The After Years. The driving force behind the Maenads, he is the last survivor of a mysterious race that prospered too greatly, causing them to destroy their own planet. He has embarked upon a lifetime's experimentation using the Crystals to learn where his kind went wrong, but somewhere along the way, he decided that the universe should not be overrun with inferior races, and programmed his ship, the True Moon, to consume the planets of races that do not live up to his expectations.

He has the ability to create Crystals, which he uses to record data on various races, and later on the True Moon to summon demons from Cecil's past and from other worlds (the worlds of Final Fantasy I, II, III, V, and VI) to attack the party. He ends up inadvertently showing the party what laid his kind low: as they prospered, so too did the evil within them, but while the people of the Blue Planet worked to contain the damage done by their inner demons, the Creator's race did not do anything like this. Using their planet's Crystals, the party draws out and destroys the darkness within him, causing him to become unstable and destroy the True Moon. He is then killed by the Maenads as the party flees from his lair with a child Maenad in tow, his last words being an expression of gratitude towards them for what they have done.

== Reception ==
The cast of Final Fantasy IV has been well received by video game publications. GameTrailers stated that by the time the game was first released, the characters surpassed common RPG stereotypes, and that the relationships between the main cast would still entertain gamers a decade later. Dragon reviewer Sandy Petersen added that the cast was notable for each having their motives in the plot which attached him to the game. The diverse number of characters has been praised for their distinctive traits by RPGFan's Matt Rickert. Greg Kasavin from GameSpot had similar comments, and appreciated that unlike other RPG protagonists, Cecil was already an experienced warrior at the start of the game and had strong relationships already established. Similarly, Micky Gunn from GamePlanet stated that thanks to the characters' expertise, the player had access to a wide variety of moves from the game's beginning.

Cecil was listed as the best hero in the Final Fantasy franchise by GamesRadar as well as one of the top 10 franchise characters by GameZone, owing to his heroic traits and character arc. Both GameSpot and IGN stated that the cast was interesting and avoided common cliches. On the other hand, while RPGamer's Michael Beckett found the main characters likable, he felt that some of the most important ones "have been copied by so many other titles in the genre that they have been rendered cliche", specifically pointing to Cecil and Rosa's personalities.

The designs from the Nintendo DS remake were praised by Elisa Di Fiore from GameSpy as making the characters appealing. The inclusion of English voice actors in the Nintendo DS remake resulted in positive reactions from RPGamer's Glenn Wilson, who stated that the actors "emote well and add to the believability of the characters", while Elisa Di Fiore stated it made the characters more enjoyable. Lark Anderson from GameSpot instead said the acting was "weak", stating that it made some scenes overdramatic.

Manga author Masashi Kishimoto cited the cast as likable and expressed a preference for both Palom and Porom and their scenes.
