= Shizuma =

Shizuma may refer to:

== People ==
- Shizuma Hodoshima, a Japanese voice actor

== Fictional characters ==
- Shizuma Hanazono, one of the main characters in Strawberry Panic
- Eiku Shizuma, a character in Blade of the Immortal
- Hasekura Shizuma, a character in Nursery Rhyme
- Shizuma Kusunagi, a character in Samurai Girl: Real Bout High School
- Shizuma, the protagonist of Brave Saga 2

== Place ==
- Shizuma Station, a train station
