= Final Fantasy IV: The After Years =

- Game logo designed by Yoshitaka Amano
- Developer: Matrix Software
- Publisher: Square Enix
- Director: Toshio Akiyama
- Producer: Takashi Tokita
- Designer: Takashi Tokita
- Artist: Akira Oguro
- Writers: Takashi Tokita; Ichiro Tezuka
- Composer: Junya Nakano
- Series: Final Fantasy
- Platforms: Mobile phone, Wii, PlayStation Portable, iOS, Android, Microsoft Windows
- Release: 2008: Original FOMA 903i / 703i; JP: February 18, 2008 – December 24, 2008 au Win Brew; JP: May 15, 2008 – February 12, 2009 SoftBank 3G; JP: November 4, 2008 – June 24, 2009 Wii; NA: June 1, 2009 – September 7, 2009; EU: June 5, 2009 – September 11, 2009; JP: July 21, 2009 – September 29, 2009 PlayStation Portable; JP: March 24, 2011; NA: April 19, 2011; EU: April 21, 2011; AU: April 28, 2011 Remake iOS/Android November 25, 2013 Microsoft Windows May 11, 2015
- Genre: Role-playing
- Modes: Single-player, multiplayer

Final Fantasy IV: The After Years is an episodic role-playing video game co-developed by Matrix Software and Square Enix, as the sequel to the 1991 title Final Fantasy IV. Set 17 years after Final Fantasy IV, The After Years follows the original cast and their descendants in episodic tales as a new villain appears, setting into action a mysterious chain of events that threatens the fate of the Blue Planet. Largely utilizing assets, locations, and mechanics from its predecessor, the title incorporates higher quality character graphics and several new gameplay systems.

The game was originally released in 2008 in Japan for mobile phones and was released worldwide as a port for WiiWare in 2009. The game was bundled with Final Fantasy IV as the PlayStation Portable compilation Final Fantasy IV: The Complete Collection, which also included a new game; Final Fantasy IV: Interlude, which served as a bridge between the original game and The After Years. In Japan, the mobile phone version was initially titled Final Fantasy IV the After: Tsuki no Kikan (Note: ファイナルファンタジーIV ジ・アフター -月の帰還-, Fainaru Fantajī Fō Ji Afutā -Tsuki no Kikan- lit. Final Fantasy IV the After: Return of the Moon) but later releases have since adopted the Western title, renaming the game to Final Fantasy IV The After Years: Tsuki no Kikan. (Note: ファイナルファンタジーIV ジ・アフターイヤーズ -月の帰還-; Fainaru Fantajī Fō Ji Afutā Iyāzu -Tsuki no Kikan-) The game was remade in 3D for the Android and iOS platforms using the same style as the Nintendo DS version of Final Fantasy IV, and was later released for Microsoft Windows.

The game received mixed or average reviews from critics, with praise towards its gameplay and its additions upon its predecessor, and divided reactions towards its plot and the game's visuals and music being derivative from Final Fantasy IV.

== Gameplay ==
A battle from the WiiWare version of the game, showcasing the "Age of the Moon" system with four party members. The text colors of the abilities shown in the lower part of the screenshot indicate their effectiveness: white abilities remain unchanged, red abilities are weaker and green abilities are stronger than normal.

Final Fantasy IV: The After Years uses most of the gameplay features of Final Fantasy IV, including random encounters and the Active Time Battle (ATB) system, which originated with IV. It also retains a number of the graphical enhancements from the WonderSwan Color and Game Boy Advance versions of Final Fantasy IV, while further improving the quality of character sprites to a level comparable with those of VI.

The battle system uses a new feature called the "Age of the Moon", reflecting the game's lunar phases changing with each rest at an inn, or over a set period of in-game time. The altering phases change physical and magical attack powers for both player characters and enemies. Certain rare monsters also only appear during certain lunar phases. The game also introduces a new type of combination attack known as a "Band" ability. Similar to the Double and Triple Techs of Chrono Trigger, these allow two or more characters to coordinate separate commands into a single new attack at the cost of MP from all involved. Band abilities are extremely powerful, and there are over 70 different combinations in all.

== Plot ==
=== Setting ===
Following the events of the original Final Fantasy IV, the second moon leaves the Blue Planet's orbit, and a period of peace begins as Damcyan, Eblan, and the Village of Mist are rebuilt, while the Kingdom of Baron comes under the rule of Cecil and his wife, Rosa. However, seventeen years later, the second moon reappears, much closer to the planet than it was the first time, and the unchanging Crystals begin to emit a soft light. The meaning behind these events remains unknown.

Most of the cast from the original game return, with many of Final Fantasy IV's NPCs now playable. A number of entirely new characters are also introduced. Among these new additions are Ceodore Harvey, Prince of Baron and son to Cecil and Rosa; the "Hooded Man", a wandering swordsman enshrouded in purple robes who seems strangely familiar with Cecil's previous adventure; the "Mysterious Woman", a female antagonist able to summon Eidolons, who attacks the kingdoms in search of the Crystals, and the "Man in Black", a man with powerful black magic who refuses to reveal his past. The storyline of the game unfolds through episodic chapters, released roughly once a month, each primarily focused on a specific character. These chapters utilize foreshadowing, cliffhangers, flashbacks, and a nonlinear narrative structure to build the world setting and both explore and expand upon the mysterious events befalling the Blue Planet. The final chapter, which is considerably longer than all others, draws all of the chapters together, linking them up into one unifying narrative.

=== Synopsis ===
The story begins as characters from the original game begin to notice the reappearance of the second moon. This is of great concern to Cecil and Rosa who remember their previous ordeal. Meanwhile, Ceodore sets out with Biggs and Wedge, members of the Red Wings, as part of his initiation into the famous air force. Ceodore is a nervous young man who is afraid he will never step out of the shadow of his famous parents. As his test begins, he descends into a cave to obtain the Knight's Emblem, which turns out to be a rat's tail. Wedge and Biggs explain that the purpose of the test was to show him that he already had what it takes to be a Red Wing, he just needed to prove it to himself. As the Red Wings set off, the game cuts to Baron, where Cecil, Rosa, and Cid are defending the city from an onslaught of monsters. After surviving several waves of attacks they meet the Mysterious Woman. Cecil asks Cid to take Rosa to safety as he confronts the intruder. The woman summons Bahamut and defeats Cecil.

Meanwhile, the airship carrying Ceodore also encounters monsters. The airship crashes killing everyone but Ceodore. Realizing he is now the last of the Red Wings, he sets out on the long journey home. However, he is attacked by a group of monsters and is about to be killed when he is rescued by a Hooded Man. As the two head toward Mysidia, the game intercuts to Mt. Ordeals, where Kain is heading out toward Baron. Along the way, he gathers the Crystals of Air, Earth, Fire and Water at the request of the Mysterious Woman. Eventually, he kidnaps Rosa as well, stating that he is planning to kill Cecil so he can have Rosa for himself. Meanwhile, Ceodore, the Hooded Man, and Edward intercept Kain in front of Cecil's throneroom. At this point, it is revealed that the Hooded Man is in fact the real Kain, and the Kain that has taken the crystals and Rosa is Kain's "dark half". After their duel, the true Kain wins and becomes a Holy Dragoon. Kain, Ceodore, Rosa, and Edward continue on their way to meet Cecil as the first episode ends.

The second episode begins with Rydia, Luca and Edge on board an airship in the subterranean world. The Man in Black mysteriously appears from nowhere and takes control of the airship, directing it toward Baron. As the party approaches the castle, they witness meteors from the second moon bombarding the world. They return to Baron Castle to find it sealed by a magical force field. The four travel the world searching for their lost friends, encountering the Mysterious Woman again, and helping Rydia search for her missing Eidolons. After breaking the Mysterious Woman's control over Titan, Shiva, Ramuh, and Ifrit, the party is able to enter Baron Castle and find Cecil threatening Ceodore, Rosa, and Kain. After freeing Cecil from the Mysterious Woman's control, the Man in Black reveals himself to be Golbez, Cecil's brother. By this stage, the second moon is getting closer to the Blue Planet and the party realizes they have to find a way to stop it. Boarding the Lunar Whale they land on the second moon and descend into its depths. During the descent, the party encounters several bosses from the other Final Fantasy games. Eventually, they encounter Cecil's evil side, the Dark Knight. Once the Dark Knight is defeated, Cecil returns to the Light.

Once the party reaches the lowermost depths of the second moon, they discover that the Mysterious Woman is not a single individual, but an entire race of identical women called "Maenads". Each Maenad was part of a group of beings created to retrieve the crystals. Venturing further, they encounter an entity known as The Creator. He reveals that his race died out due to a failure to evolve. The Creator decided that the universe should not be allowed to be overrun with inferior species, so he created the crystals and sent them to various life-sustaining worlds as a way to monitor the progress of life on each planet. He determined if the world did not evolve to its fullest potential it must be destroyed, which is what is currently happening to the Blue Planet. After the party defeats the Creator, the moon starts to break apart. As they escape, the party pauses to rescue a child Maenad, and the other Maenads turn on their "father" and defeat the Creator so the party can escape with her. As the Creator dies, he thanks the party for defeating him, indicating he may have felt some regret for his actions. Once the party returns to the Planet, they return to their various homes to resume their lives. Rydia adopts the child Maenad and names her Cuore, and Cecil informs Ceodore that he shall serve in the Red Wings under the command of Kain. Cecil also orders all of Baron's airships to be disarmed and instead be used to help the other kingdoms rebuild after the devastation caused by the second moon.

== Development ==
Final Fantasy IV: The After Years was developed by Matrix Software with Takashi Tokita as producer. The game was in development in 2007. During the development of the enhanced remake of Final Fantasy IV for the Nintendo DS, Tokita was approached by Square Enix's mobile team to collaborate on a Final Fantasy game for Japanese mobile phones. Tokita proposed the idea of a sequel to Final Fantasy IV based on the idea that it would be entertaining for players to complete the remake and be able to play the sequel afterward. The choice to keep the 2D sprites was to allow as many chapters to be made as possible while also invoking the feeling of nostalgia for its predecessor. Tokita, who had grown attached to the characters, having also previously worked as scenario writer for the original game, decided that releasing the sequel in mobile format would be a good idea, as it would allow players to access the game for only a short while after completing the DS remake. By releasing it in episodic format, he also hoped that players would anticipate future chapters in much the same way as an anime or manga series, rather than tiring of the game after completing it all at once.

Tokita was particular about wanting to develop "not just a proper sequel with graphics like the original SNES titles, but an episodic game similar to a serialized manga" and knew that "account planning, software implementation, and debugging for weekly releases would be a challenge" so he prioritized the game's quality with the release a new chapter every three weeks instead of weekly. Reflecting on the game's release format and structure after release, he considered it "a revolutionary experiment in an era before DLC, especially on flip phones" and highlighted "the final chapter where one can freely choose the number of party characters".

Although the look and feel of the game have remained largely unchanged from that of the original Final Fantasy IV, new gameplay elements were incorporated, and Kazuko Shibuya, 2D sprite artist for the first six Final Fantasy games, returned to create new, higher quality character graphics. Yoshitaka Amano also returned as an image illustrator, with character designs by Akira Oguro, a previous colleague of Tokita's and storyboard artist for Square Enix. Much of Nobuo Uematsu's original music for Final Fantasy IV is also included, although new compositions are also used.

After the mobile release, there were rumors about the title getting a release outside of Japan. A rating by the ESRB for a Wii game titled Final Fantasy IV: The After Years was discovered in late February 2009, leading to speculation regarding a North American localization of the game distributed via WiiWare, which was officially confirmed at the Game Developers Conference. Square Enix also trademarked The After Years in Europe, hinting at a release in that territory as well. It was later confirmed with the opening of the official site, which provided a PEGI rating for the title.

The WiiWare port of the game features several graphical enhancements over the mobile version, including larger screen resolution, clearer menu screens and fonts, and improved character portraits. The English localization follows the precedents set by the DS remake of Final Fantasy IV, featuring similar writing and making use of the same translations of names and terminology. A few edits have been made to the English version, including the modification of Ceodore's official character artwork to Westernize his face, as well as alterations to several female characters in order to make their clothing less revealing.

Following a serialized worldwide release of the game on WiiWare like the original version, the game was released in its entirety bundled together with Final Fantasy IV and a chapter bridging the events from both games in Final Fantasy IV: The Complete Collection for the PlayStation Portable. Afterwards, a 3D remake of the game similar to the one given to Final Fantasy IV including all chapters of the game was first released on iOS and Android smartphones, and would be released on PC via Steam as well.

== Releases ==
Originally released to the Japanese mobile phone market as Final Fantasy IV the After: Tsuki no Kikan, the first two installments of the episodic game, "Prologue" and "Ceodore's Tale", were published simultaneously for each individual platform. A series of eight supplemental tales were then released in intervals of about four weeks. These were followed by a semifinal installment, "Shūketsu Hen 'Tsuki no Inryoku'" (lit. "Gathering Tale: Gravitation of the Moon"), which required that the player has completed the supplemental "Kain's Tale". The game's finale was released in two parts as "Shūshō Zenpen 'Shingetsu'" (lit. "Last Chapter Part One 'The True Moon'") and "Shūshō Kōhen 'Hoshikui'" (lit. "Last Chapter Part Two 'The Planet Eater'").

An enhanced port of the game was published through the WiiWare service in 2009. Although it retained the episodic format used in the mobile version, the release structure was modified. The player purchases the main story consisting of the "Prologue", "Ceodore's Tale" and "Kain's Tale", while the additional supplemental installments were subsequently released as add-ons. The penultimate episode and the two-part finale were combined into a single final installment called "The Crystals: The Planet Eater". In both versions, the player is able to save their settings as well as their characters' status and equipment at the end of gameplay, and can also further explore each tale to discover new items and complete special tasks. The complete game was bundled with Final Fantasy IV and a new scenario (Final Fantasy IV: Interlude) as the PlayStation Portable compilation Final Fantasy IV: The Complete Collection, released in 2011. A 3D remake in the same vein as the 3D remake of Final Fantasy IV was released for iOS and Android on November 24, 2013. This version was ported onto Steam for Windows and was released on May 12, 2015.

Main story
Tale		Release date			
Tale		FOMA 903i / 703i	au Win Brew	SoftBank 3G	WiiWare
"Prologue: Return of the Moon"; Joshō "Tsuki no Kikan" (序章 『月の帰還』)		JP: February 18, 2008	JP: May 15, 2008	JP: November 4, 2008	NA: June 1, 2009; EU: June 5, 2009; JP: July 21, 2009
"Ceodore's Tale: The Last of the Red Wings"; Seodoa Hen "Saigo no Akaki Tsubasa" (セオドア編 『最後の赤き翼』)		JP: February 18, 2008	JP: May 15, 2008	JP: November 4, 2008	NA: June 1, 2009; EU: June 5, 2009; JP: July 21, 2009
"Kain's Tale: Return of the Dragoon"; Kain Hen "Ryūkishi no Kikan" (カイン編 『竜騎士の帰還』)		JP: August 20, 2008	JP: October 9, 2008	JP: April 1, 2009	NA: June 1, 2009; EU: June 5, 2009; JP: July 21, 2009
Optional scenarios
Tale		Release date			
Tale		FOMA 903i / 703i	au Win Brew	SoftBank 3G	WiiWare
"Rydia's Tale: The Eidolons Shackled"; Ridia Hen "Tozasareta Genjū-tachi" (リディア編 『閉ざされた幻獣たち』)		JP: March 17, 2008	JP: June 5, 2008	JP: December 1, 2008	NA: June 1, 2009; EU: June 5, 2009; JP: July 28, 2009
"Yang's Tale: The Master of Fabul"; Yan Hen "Fabūru no Shifu" (ヤン編 『ファブールの師父』)		JP: April 9, 2008	JP: June 26, 2008	JP: December 17, 2008	NA: July 6, 2009; EU: July 10, 2009; JP: August 4, 2009
"Palom's Tale: The Mage's Voyage"; Paromu Hen "Madōshi, Mori to Mizu no Miyako e" (パロム編 『魔道士、森と水の都へ』)		JP: May 1, 2008	JP: July 17, 2008	JP: January 7, 2009	NA: July 6, 2009; EU: July 10, 2009; JP: August 18, 2009
"Edge's Tale: The Pulse of Babil"; Ejji Hen "Babuiru no Kodō" (エッジ編 『バブイルの鼓動』)		JP: May 28, 2008	JP: August 7, 2008	JP: January 28, 2009	NA: July 6, 2009; EU: July 10, 2009; JP: August 25, 2009
"Porom's Tale: The Vanished Lunar Whale"; Poromu Hen "Tsuki e Kieta Madōsen" (ポロム編 『月へ消えた魔導船』)		JP: June 23, 2008	JP: August 28, 2008	JP: February 18, 2009	NA: August 3, 2009; EU: August 7, 2009; JP: September 1, 2009
"Edward's Tale: Star-Crossed Damcyan"; Girubāto Hen "Hoshi Otsuru Damushian" (ギルバート編 『星落つるダムシアン』)		JP: July 22, 2008	JP: September 18, 2008	JP: March 11, 2009	NA: August 3, 2009; EU: August 7, 2009; JP: September 8, 2009
"The Lunarians' Tale: The Blue Planet That Was"; Tsuki no Tami Hen "Tsuioku no Aoki Hoshi" (月の民編 『追憶の青き星』)		JP: September 16, 2008	JP: November 6, 2008	JP: April 22, 2009	NA: August 3, 2009; EU: August 7, 2009; JP: September 15, 2009
Final episode
Tale		Release date			
Mobile phones	WiiWare	FOMA 903i / 703i	au Win Brew	SoftBank 3G	WiiWare
Shūketsu Hen "Tsuki no Inryoku" (集結編 『月の引力』)	"The Crystals: The Planet Eater"; Shingetsu Hen: Hoshikui (真月編 『星喰』)	JP: October 15, 2008	JP: December 11, 2008	JP: May 13, 2009	NA: September 7, 2009; EU: September 11, 2009; JP: September 29, 2009
Shūshō Zenpen "Shingetsu" (終章・前編 『真月』)	"The Crystals: The Planet Eater"; Shingetsu Hen: Hoshikui (真月編 『星喰』)	JP: November 19, 2008	JP: January 15, 2009	JP: June 3, 2009	NA: September 7, 2009; EU: September 11, 2009; JP: September 29, 2009
Shūshō Kōhen "Hoshikui" (終章・後編 『星喰』)	"The Crystals: The Planet Eater"; Shingetsu Hen: Hoshikui (真月編 『星喰』)	JP: December 24, 2008	JP: February 12, 2009	JP: June 24, 2009	NA: September 7, 2009; EU: September 11, 2009; JP: September 29, 2009

== Reception ==
Reception

Aggregate score
Aggregator	Score
Metacritic	WII: 69/100 iOS: 62/100

Review scores
Publication	Score
Eurogamer	7/10
GamePro	3/5
GameRevolution	3/10
GameSpot	5.5/10
IGN	8/10
Nintendo Life	7/10
RPGamer	4/5
RPGFan	9/10
TouchArcade	iOS: 3/5

In August 2008, Final Fantasy IV: The After Years reached a benchmark of one million downloads (not including downloads of the free prologue chapter) in the first five months following its initial release. As of December 2010, it has exceeded 4.5 million paid downloads.

Reviews of the WiiWare port of the game have been mixed, with an overall score of 69/100 at Metacritic. IGN gave the game an 8 out of 10, calling the story "engrossing but mysterious" and stating that the gameplay, graphics, and presentation, while "dated", are "part of the charm". However, GameSpot gave the game a score of only 5.5 out of 10, saying that it had a "disjointed, poorly constructed narrative" and an excessively high encounter rate, and criticized "recycled" content such as the music, graphics, environments, and story. Jason Schreier of Kotaku also gave the game an extremely negative review. The After Years was nominated for Game of the Year by Nintendo Power, as well as WiiWare Game of the Year.

== See also ==
- Before Crisis: Final Fantasy VII
- Final Fantasy Dimensions
