= Final Fantasy Dimensions =

2010 video game

- Game artwork by Yoshitaka Amano depicting Vata (left) and The Mask (right)
- Developers: Matrix Software; Square Enix
- Publisher: Square Enix
- Director: Toshio Akiyama
- Producer: Takashi Tokita
- Artist: Akira Oguro
- Composer: Naoshi Mizuta
- Series: Final Fantasy
- Platforms: FOMA 903i, iOS, Android
- Release: FOMA 903i: JP: September 6, 2010; au: JP: December 9, 2010; iOS: WW: August 31, 2012; Android: JP: August 31, 2012; WW: December 21, 2012
- Genre: Role-playing
- Mode: Single-player

Final Fantasy Dimensions (Note: Known in Japan as Final Fantasy Legends: Hikari to Yami no Senshi (Japanese: ファイナルファンタジー レジェンズ 光と闇の戦士, Hepburn: Fainaru Fantajī Rejenzu: Hikari to Yami no Senshi; lit. "Final Fantasy Legends: Warriors of Light and Darkness")) is a role-playing video game developed by Matrix Software and published by Square Enix for mobile devices. Similar to Final Fantasy IV: The After Years, it was initially released as an episodic game, with the first two installments released in September 2010 on the Japanese i-mode distribution service, and in December 2010 for the EZweb distribution service. The game was remade for the iOS and Android platforms and released internationally in August 2012.

Final Fantasy Dimensions features 2D graphics and a Job Change System similar to that of Final Fantasy V. Its battle system is a variation of the Final Fantasy series's Active Time Battle system. The game follows two parties, the Warriors of Light and the Warriors of Darkness, with players controlling up to five party members at a time in battle, on their quest to reform their shattered world and foil the dark plans of the Avalon Empire. In 2015, a sequel was released, titled Final Fantasy Dimensions II.

== Gameplay ==
A Fusion Ability being unlocked mid-battle.

Final Fantasy Dimensions is a role-playing video game, developed in the style of previous 16-bit Final Fantasy games. The game uses the Active Time Battle system in which a character's turn are determined by a gauge that fills over time during battle. Once the gauge fills completely from one character, players can choose a command from that specific character. After choosing a command, the gauge fills over again to execute the command. Once the gauge fills again and the command is executed, the gauge empties and repeats the cycle. Similar to Final Fantasy IV: The After Years, the game was released in an episodic format, but players must play through each episode in sequence. Players command a party of five with the party members changing in each episode.

The game uses a Job System similar to Final Fantasy V as a base of its battles. The game allows players to change job while still retaining skills that have already been acquired. Job-specific abilities can be learned after crossing a certain amount of AP for the current job given. That learned ability can be set even if the player changes to a different job. Players are limited in how many abilities they can set at a given time. This limit rises as the job's level rises. The game also has "Fusion Abilities" which players can form by setting combinations of certain abilities.

The Jobs available from the beginning for all the eight main characters are Freelancer, Warrior, Monk, Thief, Red Mage, White Mage, Black Mage, and Summoner. Each episode introduces a new Job, which is unlocked after completing the episode. The unlockable jobs for the Warriors of Light are Dragoon, Bard, Memorist, Paladin, and Seer, while the jobs unlocked for the Warriors of Darkness are Ranger, Dark Knight, Dancer, Ninja, and Magus.

== Plot ==
Long ago, there was a great world war ended by the efforts of the Avalon Empire, which became the dominant power in the land. The story begins with Sol, Diana, Glaive and Aigis being sent by the King of Lux to investigate a powerful crystal linked to the balance of the world. Simultaneously, Nacht, Alba, Dusk and Sarah are sent by the Avalon Empire to break their treaty with Lux by stealing the same crystal. On the way to the crystal's shrine, Sol's party aids a mysterious man called Elgo, who agrees to accompany them to the temple. When the two groups meet within the crystal shrine, the crystal's guardian spirit attacks them. Upon its guardian's defeat, the crystal shatters and splits the world into two halves: the "World of Light", ever in daylight, and the "World of Darkness" in which day never rises. Sol, Aigis, Dusk, and Sarah remain in the first half of the world and become the "Warriors of Light", with Elgo accompanying them. Nacht, Alba, Diana and Glaive find themselves in the other half and become the "Warriors of Darkness". Both groups of Warriors travel the split world in search of each other. As they travel, they retrieve the fragments of the crystal, which grant them new abilities and gradually cause the world to reform. They also encounter the Avalon Empire and their four Generals: Vata, Baugauven, Asmodai, and Styx. All four generals are defeated except for Vata, who decides to aid the Warriors for reasons unknown. In the battle between the Warriors of Light and Baugauven aboard an Avalon ship, Elgo seemingly sacrifices himself to save the Warriors of Light.

As the two worlds begin to merge, Dusk and Alba reveal their plans to go to the ancient floating city known as Mysidia. Once the Warriors of Light arrive and meet the Elder of Mysidia, Sophia, the Avalon Empire attempt to strike Mysidia with their airship superweapon Heliogabalus. The warriors destroy the ship with the aid of Dr. Lugae, the living doll Argy, and Barbara and her dragons. Sophia then helps the warriors gain the last remaining crystal in the World of Light within the caves of Mysidia. After gaining the crystal's ability, Mysidia falls to the ground while simultaneously the Warriors of Darkness are aided by a mysterious man known as The Mask in gaining the last crystal fragment remaining in the World of Darkness. They succeed in gaining the fragment, but The Mask dies. Before his death, he reveals himself to be Elgo's other half that formed when the world split in two and asks the Warriors of Darkness to take care of his other Half as he dies. After both parties gain the fragments, the split world merges and both parties are reunited, but most of the people in the world have disappeared. Attempting to make a frontal attack to the Avalon Empire, the warriors discover a barrier protecting Avalon and eight gates across the world, linking to a realm called the Rift. Upon entering one of the gates, the warriors encounter a dark sphere in which Sophia explains it is a substance found only in the Rift known as Dark Matter, and that Avalon's goal is to harvest it for their evil purposes. Vata explains the Avalon Empire is guarding the dark matter across the world with their generals, who have been revived in undead forms. After collecting all eight pieces of the dark matter and defeating the undead generals, the dark matter fuses together, creating a new crystal and revealing that the crystal split the world to protect itself from the Empire's plans. The crystal then breaks the barrier that was protecting Avalon, allowing the warriors to enter.

Upon entering Avalon, they defeat all of the Divine Generals. Once the Warriors attack the Emperor, it is revealed that they were battling with his armor, and that he was never there. After this revelation, a new gate to the Rift opens within Avalon. When the warriors enter the Rift, they encounter Vata, who explains that they are in the void and warns them that, in order for them to proceed, someone must make a sacrifice. As they traverse the void, they encounter the armies of Nil, having to fight the four magical blades of Nil. After defeating the four blades, another gate appears in the Void. Dr. Lugae reports to the warriors that the gates are what is known as "Dark Flow", and that it is draining the life of the world into Nil, a dark dimension of shadows. Vata attempts to aid the warriors in destroying the Dark Flow by being engulfed by it and attempting to control it. As he is being engulfed by Dark Flow, he reveals he originally was part of a village that Avalon destroyed. He trained to be in the ranks of the generals of Avalon, but when he discovered he could never be a match for them, he gave up on his plans until he discovered the Warriors. Vata fails at the cost of his life, and the Dark Flow remains. The Warriors then enter Dark Flow, leading them to the World of Nil.

Coming to the palace at the center of Nil, they encounter the Emperor himself, who is revealed to be Elgo. Elgo explains to the party that he wished to use the crystals to achieve immortality, and predicted that the crystals, sensing his purpose, would split the world hoping to halt his plans. Elgo then utilized the power of Nil to move between the worlds and ensured that the Warriors collect the crystals in effort to restore the world so that he could achieve his goals. The Warriors and Elgo battle, with Elgo using the power of Nil against them. When he is defeated, Elgo loses control of Nil and it mutates him into a dark monster. The Warriors, seeing that Nil will ravage their world unchecked, fight the transformed Elgo and win. As Nil reverses its flow and life is returned to the world, all the Warriors flee, apart from Dusk and Alba, who are presumed dead. Soon however, they are revealed to be alive, saved by the spirits of Vata and the Mask. The game ends with the Warriors reunited, and the world and its crystal restored.

== Development ==
The game was developed by the same internal Square Enix team that made Final Fantasy IV: The After Years, which was also initially a game for Japanese cell phones. The game was directed by Toshio Akiyama and produced by Takashi Tokita. Character designs were provided by Akira Oguro while the in-game 2D dot versions were created by Kazuko Shibuya. Takashi Tokita explained the game was meant to transcend the expectations of RPGs in cellphones. The team set the theme of a scenario of creating another game for the SNES. The team also added several references to previous games such as Sarah and Matoya being references to the original Final Fantasy game and Dusk and Alba being reminiscent of Palom and Porom from Final Fantasy IV. When asked about the high pricing for the game, the team explained their reasons: "This title offers about 50 hours of gameplay, and we feel that our community can enjoy the contents of this game as much as they would a console title. Also, we have set the price where it is because this title was developed specifically for the mobile platform, as opposed to just being a port of an older console or handheld game". When developing the smartphone version, Takashi Tokita changed the structure of selling a group of episodes rather than individually. Tokita noted that the episodic format of the game allowed them to focus on different origins to protagonist and tell two stories that intertwine together. Player feedback between episodes was vital factor in the story progress, as the fate of the characters was undetermined.

=== Music ===
Naoshi Mizuta composed the music of Final Fantasy Dimensions with the exception of a number of songs previously composed by Nobuo Uematsu. Naoshi intended to compose the music closer to previous Final Fantasy games such as a solid melody that can be hummed or whistled. Naoshi also made it so that the Light chapters would have different music from the Dark chapters in order to have variation of music between them. A soundtrack for the game titled Final Fantasy Legends: Hikari to Yami no Senshi Original Soundtrack (Note: ファイナルファンタジー レジェンズ 光と闇の戦士 オリジナル・サウンドトラック) was released digitally in Japan on August 8, 2011 to celebrate the completion of the game. An EP soundtrack titled Sekai no yukue from Final Fantasy Legends (Note: セカイノユクエ from FINAL FANTASY LEGENDS, lit. "The World's Future from Final Fantasy Legends") was also released digitally in Japan on iTunes and mora music store on August 31, 2012. The EP contains the arranged ending song with added lyrics featured in the iOS/Android version and being renamed using Katakana. The song was arranged by Hajime Kikuchi with added lyrics performed by Riya of Eufonius.

Final Fantasy Legends: Hikari to Yami no Senshi Original Soundtrack
No.	Title	Length
1.	"Prelude LEGENDS EDITION" (プレリュード LEGENDS EDITION)	4:26
2.	"Senshi no Gaisen" (戦士の凱旋)	2:37
3.	"Furusato no Fuzukaze" (故郷に吹く風)	4:50
4.	"Hikaro no Tabiji" (光の旅路)	3:13
5.	"Hikari hanatsu ha" (光放つ刃)	1:21
6.	"Ken o osamete" (剣をおさめて)	0:53
7.	"Funk de Chocobo" (ファンク de チョコボ)	2:31
8.	"Ma no hisomu hora" (魔の潜む洞)	2:56
9.	"Yami no hōkō" (闇の彷徨)	2:24
10.	"Yami o saku ken" (闇を裂く剣)	1:37
11.	"Itadaki o koete" (頂きを越えて)	2:15
12.	"Komorebi no shinden" (木漏れ日の神殿)	3:23
13.	"Kyōi ni tachimukau" (脅威に立ち向かう)	1:42
14.	"Isshokusokuhatsu!" (一触即発!)	0:58
15.	"Teikoku avaron" (帝国アヴァロン)	2:24
16.	"Teikoku shitennō" (帝国四天王)	2:29
17.	"Kanashimi o kokoro ni himete" (悲しみを心に秘めて)	3:07
18.	"Ima wa tōi kimi ni" (今は遠い君に)	1:59
19.	"Kamen no Otoko" (仮面の男)	1:35
20.	"Ōinaru tabidachi" (大いなる旅立ち)	1:44
21.	"Arufuheimu" (アルフヘイム)	2:56
22.	"Oyasumi, ima wa" (おやすみ、今は)	0:10
23.	"Gin'yūshijin no koi" (吟遊詩人の恋)	0:18
24.	"Dowāfu no tani" (ドワーフの谷)	1:49
25.	"Kurisutaru no kakera" (クリスタルの欠片)	0:07
26.	"Harukanaru furusato" (遥かなる故郷)	3:23
27.	"Odoriko matōya" (踊り子マトーヤ)	0:19
28.	"Yukaina machikado" (愉快な街角)	1:36
29.	"Shock!!" (衝撃!!)	0:04
30.	"Mukuro-tachi no sumika" (骸たちの住処)	3:03
31.	"Kakurezato" (隠れ里)	3:44
32.	"Nuke shinobu" (抜け忍)	0:16
33.	"Jigen hendō" (次元変動)	3:47
34.	"Tasogareta sekai" (黄昏た世界)	3:03
35.	"Sora kakeru fune ni nori" (空駆ける船に乗り)	1:54
36.	"Dark Flow" (ダークフロー)	1:09
37.	"Kessen e" (決戦へ)	2:39
38.	"Opening LEGENDS EDITION" (オープニング LEGENDS EDITION)	2:13
39.	"Yogen no shinsō" (予言の真相)	1:19
40.	"IMPERATOR"	2:38
41.	"Konton no uzu no naka de" (混沌の渦の中で)	3:03
42.	"Epilogue" (エピローグ)	3:35
43.	"Sekai no yukue" (世界の行方)	4:33

Sekai no yukue from Final Fantasy Legends
No.	Title	Length
1.	"Sekai no yukue" (セカイノユクエ)	4:52
2.	"Sekai no yukue (instrumental)" (セカイノユクエ (instrumental))	4:52
3.	"Hikari no tabiji" (光の旅路)	3:19
4.	"Yami o saku ken" (闇を裂く剣)	1:45
5.	"Teikoku shitennō" (帝国四天王)	2:36

=== Release history ===
The game was initially hinted when Square Enix trademarked Hikari to Yami no Senshi which was initially believed to be related to Tactics Ogre: Let Us Cling Together. The game was revealed in Japan as Final Fantasy Legends: Hikari to Yami no Senshi in July 2010. The first chapters of the game were first released for iMode phones on September 6, and for EZweb phones on December 9 the same year. The rest of the chapters were released approximately once a month since then till August 8, 2011 for iMode and November 10 for EZweb. An iOS and Android versions, with improved graphics and sound, and support for slide-pad controls over the feature phone version, were later announced and iOS version was released internationally as Final Fantasy Dimensions on August 31, 2012. Due to technical difficulties, only "Prologue" was released first for the iOS version. All other chapters were purchasable at the in-app shop after upgrading from 1.0.0 to 1.0.1 which was available later in the same day. The Android version was released on December 21 in its complete form.

Chapters
Tale		Release date			
Feature phone	Smart phone	i-mode	EZweb	iOS	Android
Prologue; Joshō (序章)	Prologue; Joshō (序章)	JP: September 6, 2010	JP: December 9, 2010	WW: August 31, 2012	JP: August 31, 2012; WW: Dec, 21, 2012
Tome of Dawn; Akatsuki no Shō (暁の章)	Ch.1 Reckoning; Akatsuki no Tabidachi (暁の旅立ち)	JP: September 6, 2010	JP: December 9, 2010	WW: August 31, 2012	Dec, 21, 2012
Tome of Light, the Dragoon's Tale: The Last of the Dragoons; Hikari no Shō Ryūkishi Hen "Saigo no Ryūkishi" (光の章 竜騎士編 『最後の竜騎士』)	Ch.2 The Generals Approach; Teikoku Yonshōgun no Kyōi (帝国四将軍の脅威)	JP: October 4, 2010	JP: January 6, 2011	WW: August 31, 2012	Dec, 21, 2012
Tome of Darkness, the Ranger's Tale: The Ranger Whose Light was Stolen; Yami no Shō Renjā Hen "Hikari Ubawareshi Renjā" (闇の章 レンジャー編 『光奪われしレンジャー』)	Ch.2 The Generals Approach; Teikoku Yonshōgun no Kyōi (帝国四将軍の脅威)	JP: November 1, 2010	JP: February 10, 2011	WW: August 31, 2012	Dec, 21, 2012
Tome of Light, the Bard's Tale: A Bard's Love; Hikari no Shō Gin'yūshijin Hen "Gin'yūshijin no Koi" (光の章 吟遊詩人編 『吟遊詩人の恋』)	Ch.2 The Generals Approach; Teikoku Yonshōgun no Kyōi (帝国四将軍の脅威)	JP: December 6, 2010	JP: March 10, 2011	WW: August 31, 2012	Dec, 21, 2012
Tome of Darkness, the Dark Knight's Tale: The Knight Wandering in Darkness; Yami no Shō Ankokukishi Hen "Samayō Ankoku no Kishi" (闇の章 暗黒騎士編 『さまよう暗黒の騎士』)	Ch.2 The Generals Approach; Teikoku Yonshōgun no Kyōi (帝国四将軍の脅威)	JP: January 4, 2011	JP: April 7, 2011	WW: August 31, 2012	Dec, 21, 2012
Tome of Light, the Memorist's Tale: The Memorist's Sorrow; Hikari no Shō Memorisuto Hen "Kanashimi no Memorisuto" (光の章 メモリスト編 『哀しみのメモリスト』)	Ch.3 Warriors of Light and Darkness; Hikari to Yami no Senshitachi (光と闇の戦士たち)	JP: February 7, 2011	JP: June 9, 2011	WW: August 31, 2012	Dec, 21, 2012
Tome of Darkness, the Dancer's Tale: Dancer of the Battlefield; Yami no Shō Odoriko Hen "Senjō no Odoriko" (闇の章 踊り子編 『戦場の踊り子』)	Ch.3 Warriors of Light and Darkness; Hikari to Yami no Senshitachi (光と闇の戦士たち)	JP: March 7, 2011	JP: May 19, 2011	WW: August 31, 2012	Dec, 21, 2012
Tome of Light, the Knight's Tale: Revival of a Knight; Hikari no Shō Naito Hen "Kishi no Fukkatsu" (光の章 ナイト編 『騎士の復活』)	Ch.3 Warriors of Light and Darkness; Hikari to Yami no Senshitachi (光と闇の戦士たち)	JP: April 11, 2011	JP: July 7, 2011	WW: August 31, 2012	Dec, 21, 2012
Tome of Darkness, the Ninja's Tale: A Shinobi's Fate; Yami no Shō Ninja Hen "Shinobi no Unmē" (闇の章 忍者編 『忍びの運命』)	Ch.3 Warriors of Light and Darkness; Hikari to Yami no Senshitachi (光と闇の戦士たち)	JP: May 9, 2011	JP: August 4, 2011	WW: August 31, 2012	Dec, 21, 2012
Tome of Twilight; Tasogare no Shō (黄昏の章)	Ch.4 Twilight; Tasogare no Sekai (黄昏る世界)	JP: June 13, 2011	JP: September 8, 2011	WW: August 31, 2012	Dec, 21, 2012
Finale Part One: Decisive Battle! The Avalon Empire; Shūshō Zenpen "Kessen! Avaron Teikoku" (終章・前編 『決戦！アヴァロン帝国』)	Ch.4 Twilight; Tasogare no Sekai (黄昏る世界)	JP: July 11, 2011	JP: October 6, 2011	WW: August 31, 2012	Dec, 21, 2012
Finale Part Two: Fate of the World; Shūshō Kōhen "Sekai no Yukue" (終章・後編 『世界の行方』)	Ch.4 Twilight; Tasogare no Sekai (黄昏る世界)	JP: August 8, 2011	JP: November 10, 2011	WW: August 31, 2012	Dec, 21, 2012

== Reception ==
Reception

Aggregate scores
Aggregator	Score
GameRankings	74%
Metacritic	78/100

Review scores
Publication	Score
Game Informer	7.50
GamesTM	7.6/10
IGN	8.0 of 10
Pocket Gamer	4/5
RPGFan	80%
TouchArcade	4/5
Slide to Play	4 of 4
Touchgen	2.5 of 5

The game had received mainly positive reviews. Final Fantasy Dimensions received an aggregated score of 78 out of 100 on Metacritic based on 10 critics and 74% on GameRankings based on 7 reviews. Slide to Play praised the game and commented: "Square Enix has made a truly masterful game here. The story is huge, the characters enjoyable and fun to play, and other than the iffy controls, the game works fantastically well on the touchscreen. The menus in particular are elegantly designed. The music and graphics are even great in creating a world that reminds us that the old and new can coexist, and do so with aplomb". Justin Davis of IGN criticized the episodic structure of the game, saying that the "players can't fully explore the game world until they're almost at the end – over 30 hours in!", but also praised the gameplay stating: "What Dimensions lacks in scenario & story flexibility it makes up for with sheer depth and flexibility in its job system. Players can assign any party member to any available job on-the-fly, with more opening up as the story progresses". Joe Juba of Game Informer praised the gameplay but criticized the lack of fanfare: "Despite the fun job system and classic vibe to the combat, Dimensions seems like it was set up to fail. It released to little fanfare at a prohibitive price point for mobile games". Tof Eklund of TouchArcade praised the games features: "There's an epic, high fantasy plot with lots of twists, a large cast of characters whose appearance and abilities vary wildly, tons of random combat, lots of leveling-up and abilities to unlock, a gradual opening up of the world, secret items, bonus dungeons, and a lot of looking inside pots and barrels in order to pilfer the worldly goods of the townspeople you run across". GamesTM praised the game for resembling previous Final Fantasy games.

Derek Heemsbergen of RPGFan gave it a mixed review: "I'm grateful that the game was released in English, and while it isn't everything I hoped it would be, Final Fantasy: Dimensions does enough right to be worth playing". Nathan Mustafa of Touchgen however, criticized the dialogue structure, the lack of animation, and sound of the game: "In the end, I cannot reconcile these cheapened portions of the game. I understand it is a port of a 'mobile' game from Japan, but the quality of the port could have been much better. Had my three key issues with how the game presents itself not been present, I would probably have walked away feeling quite positive about Final Fantasy Dimensions. In its current form, though, I can only give it a middling score".
