= Final Fantasy Dimensions II =

2015 video game

- Developer: Matrix Software
- Publisher: Square Enix
- Directors: Takashi Tokita; Toshio Akiyama
- Producer: Kei Hirono
- Designer: Takashi Tokita
- Artist: CyDesignation
- Writer: Takashi Tokita
- Composer: Naoshi Mizuta
- Series: Final Fantasy
- Platforms: iOS, Android
- Release: JP: February 12, 2015; WW: October 31, 2017
- Genre: Role-playing
- Mode: Single-player

Final Fantasy Dimensions II, known in Japan as Final Fantasy Legends II: Toki no Suishō (Japanese: ファイナルファンタジーII レジェンズ 時空ノ水晶, Hepburn: Fainaru Fantajī Rejenzu Tsū: Toki no Suishō; lit. "Crystal of Space-Time"), is a role-playing video game developed by Matrix Software and published by Square Enix for Android and iOS devices. It is the second game released in Japan with the "Final Fantasy Legends" title after Final Fantasy Legends: Hikari to Yami no Senshi (which was localized worldwide under the name Final Fantasy Dimensions). It revolves around traveling through time in order to save the world from a god.

The game was initially released as a free-to-play title on February 15, 2015, under the name Final Fantasy Legends: Toki no Suishō. Following a massive update, it was re-branded on November 2, 2016, as Final Fantasy Legends II in Japan. On October 31, 2017, the old free-to-play version of the game was shut down and a paid one was re-launched under the name Final Fantasy Legends II: Toki no Suishō in Japan, which was released worldwide as Final Fantasy Dimensions II.

== Gameplay ==
The game uses a turn-based battle system, similar to the one used in Final Fantasy X. Only a maximum of three party members can fight in battle, with the character Mootie taking up a support role. In battle, party member commands are present on a dual-sided command ring, one side with the character's normal battle abilities and the other for summon special attacks. This allows the three members to have up to five actions on each side; a regular physical attack in the ring's middle and four abilities from summon stones equipped to the party members before entering a battle zone. In addition, each character has three consumption meters that can be filled in battle. Characters receive 20%-60% of a consumption meter point for each action they make and can use consumption meter points to summon their equipped summons. Battles run on a chain meter to determine the amount of rewards the player can select from chests after completing a battle zone. The meter loses points for taking actions from both the party and enemies, but the player can raise the meter with crystals that drop in battle by defeating enemies or by using a summon's special attack. This chain meter can reach a maximum of 4.

Energy is required to complete quests and go for any run in any area. A point of energy will regenerate every 3 minutes, and about 5-10 energy is required to challenge an area or complete a quest. Upon leveling up, the player's max energy may increase by one, and the energy bar is completely recovered. Energy is not required when fighting through the story's events that are newly released every 2–3 weeks. Recovering AP is achieved by waiting about 3 hours or so or by spending 100 Space Time Stones.

Summons play a pivotal role in a character's stats and abilities. Abilities may only be used when equipped with a certain phantom stone. In addition, character stats can only be increased by equipping weapons or accessories, or obtaining memory fragments and upgrading summon phantom stones. Space-Time Stones (STS) are the main in-game currency used. It is given to the player for free in events, storyline quests, daily rewards, broadcast sessions. It can be used to open treasure chests, or the player can invest in the cash shop itself. Beginning in 2016, the cash shop has been split into two or more unique cash-shops that require different amounts of STS to use them. For example, the event cash shop follows the standard method of summon. The player may access different cash shops by swapping left and right while in the cash shop main menu. Summons can be leveled and upgraded in rank after their phantom stone has reached the max level. Upgrading phantom stones require the player to have the summon fully leveled on its current rank. However, once a summon's phantom stone is upgraded in rank, they revert to level 1 again and must be leveled up once more. All phantom stones have a maximum rank of various stars, with a maximum at eight.

Battle encounters are presented in rounds that start once the player enters a battle zone on the world map. Once the player enters a zone, they will have to fight a barrage of enemies until they reach the end. Entering a battle zone can cost either stamina points or CP hourglasses. The player can choose to escape a battle, if they find themselves overwhelmed by the enemies, but any loot obtained during the battle will be forfeit. The loot will also be forfeit if they lose the battle.

After every battle, the player is rewarded with treasure chests. The player is able to open a certain number of chests depending on their crystal value when the battle ends. Depending on the crystal value, the player is able to open more treasure boxes at the end and a secret reward is unlocked when they reach over 4 crystals in a battle. Most battles contain seven treasure chests including the secret chest. "CHAIN" will be displayed if the player defeats two monsters without interruption. Under "CHAIN", all monsters will reel in 0.2 crystals when defeated, but "CHAIN" will disappear if the player lets monsters use any skills or attacks.

It is possible to add other people in the friend list. This enables them to use their specific phantom stone while in battle via the pet. Mootie and different types of phantom stone may be used from time to time, depending on what was equipped by Morrow in the first slot. A maximum of 30 friends can be added at any time. Friends can give a percentage of their earned Yellow Vouchers and Keys for use in the Tower of Babil from time to time, which makes it easy for them to stack if they did not spend them in the Tower over a period of time. Mootie will become stronger as the party level increases. It will also grow stronger with the party's buffs, and weaker with the party's debuffs.

By completing quests, the player will obtain an Hourglass item. Hourglasses are called "CP" and are needed to do event battles, the "Tower of Babil", or the hourglass station that can be found in almost every dimension. The hourglass station contains memory fragments of characters that permanently increase their stats. Upon receiving the memory fragment, the player must go to the memory keeper at the space dimension to exchange them for additional stat boosts. By completing quests, the player may obtain weapons, rings, phantom stones, and tails to upgrade their phantom stones.

== Plot ==
A boy named Morrow meets a girl named Aemo who work together to save time and space, making friends from all time periods as they time travel. Along the way, they find Signet Crystals which allow them to summon monsters to their aid.

== Development ==
=== Concept and creation ===
The game was originally announced in 2014 as Final Fantasy Legends: The Space-Time Crystal, and its two protagonists went by the names Tomorrow and Emo instead of Morrow and Aemo in the Dimensions II version. The game was directed, written, and designed by Takashi Tokita, based in part on his original plans for the cancelled Chrono Break, a proposed sequel to Chrono Trigger. Tokita noted that the balance between the three characters and Aemo's character settings were among the elements from his original plans. The game also took inspiration from classic Super NES titles such as Final Fantasy V and VI to bring players a sense of nostalgia.

=== Visuals and music ===
The game's character designs and image illustrations were handled by CyDesignation, an art design firm founded and directed by former Square Enix artists. The soundtrack was composed and produced by Naoshi Mizuta with over fifty tracks. The game's main theme is Timeless Tomorrow performed by the singer Lia. Mizuta crafted the music to make players feel that when they travel, they have entered a new time, this made sure that all the music was fresh and new.

=== Release ===
The game was initially released in downloadable segments over time, and was free with in app purchases available. Those who pre-registered got a white chocobo signet within the game. The game also features cameos of characters and props from other games, such as Oersted the knight from the video game Live A Live, and a spell book from The Irregular at Magic High School.

== Reception ==
Reception

Review score
Publication	Score
TouchArcade	4/5

Touch Arcade praised the games large amount of content, but noted that the game can drag because it was originally a "free to play" game and is best to play in small doses. Kotaku called the game's story about time travel as boring, also noting that the stamina system that was part of when the game was in its free form causes the game to become too easy.

By May 2015, the game had 1.5 million downloads since release.
