= Shizuma Hodoshima =

Japanese voice actor

Shizuma Hodoshima (程嶋しづマ, Hodoshima Shizuma; born 程島鎮磨, born March 28, 1973, in Chiba Prefecture) is a Japanese voice actor affiliated with MT Project. He has performed in a Shakesperean theater group since 1997 in addition to anime and video game roles.

== Notable roles ==
=== Stage ===
- A Midsummer Night's Dream
- Henry VIII
- King John
- La historia de los Tarantos
- Macbeth
- The Comedy of Errors
- The Taming of the Shrew
- The Winter's Tale
- Timon of Athens
- Twelfth Night

=== Animation ===
- Boogiepop Phantom (2000) - Hisashi Jonouchi
- Mahōjin Guru Guru: Doki Doki Legend (2000) - Kuroku, Ziman
- Dear Boys (2003) - Mitsuru Ohara
- Baku Tech! Bakugan (2012) - Master Odore

=== Video games ===
- Clock Tower 3 (2002) - Dennis Owen
- Final Fantasy IV (2007) - Cecil Harvey
- Dissidia: Final Fantasy (2008) - Cecil Harvey
- Xenoblade Chronicles (2010) - Alvis
- Final Fantasy Explorers (2014) - Cecil Harvey
- World of Final Fantasy Maxima (2018) - Cecil Harvey
- Oninaki (2019) - Treize
- Live A Live (2022) - Streibough
- Xenoblade Chronicles 3: Future Redeemed (2023) - Alpha
