= Takashi Tokita =

Japanese video game designer

- 時田 貴司
- Born: January 24, 1965 (age 61); Japan
- Occupations: Video game designer, director, producer
- Years active: 1984–present
- Employers: Zap (1984–1986); Square (1986–2003); Square Enix (2003–present)
- Known for: Final Fantasy series; Live A Live; Chrono Trigger
- Spouse: Naomi Orikasa

Takashi Tokita (時田 貴司, Tokita Takashi) (born 24 January 1965) is a Japanese video game developer working for Square Enix. He has worked there since 1986 and has worked as the lead designer for Final Fantasy IV as well as the director of Live A Live, Parasite Eve and Chrono Trigger.

== Career ==
Tokita joined Square in 1986 as a part-time employee, not becoming full-time until the development of Final Fantasy IV. For the first three Final Fantasy games, he worked on graphic art, testing, and sound effects, respectively, before becoming lead designer of Final Fantasy IV in 1991.

Tokita wanted to make a career as a theater actor, but working on Final Fantasy IV made him decide to become a "great creator" of video games. He was one of only 14 people working on the game. Tokita feels that Final Fantasy IV is the first game in the series to really pick up on drama, and the first Japanese RPG to feature "such deep characters and plot". He also felt that Final Fantasy IV was so good because it was the culmination of the best parts of the first three games.

Chrono Trigger is a role-playing video game developed and published by Square for the Super Nintendo Entertainment System in 1995. Director credits were attributed to Akihiko Matsui, Yoshinori Kitase and Takashi Tokita. Tetsuya Takahashi had the role of graphic director. Additionally, Takashi Tokita, along with Yoshinori Kitase wrote the various subplots to the game.

Following that title, he was also involved in the production of Final Fantasy VII.

He handled the game design for Parasite Eve and wrote the game's story. He considers the later games in the series as having been "handed off" to others.

After the successful remakes of Final Fantasy III and Final Fantasy IV, there was a desire by the team to make a new game in the same style.

He was the lead developer on Final Fantasy IV: The After Years.

His greatest inspiration was Dragon Quest II, since it emotionally engaged him like no game he had played before.

Between 2003 and 2007, Tokita was the head of Square's Product Development Division 7.

Currently, Tokita is a senior manager and producer in Square Enix's Business Division 8.

== Works ==
Year	Title	Role(s)
1985	Fairy	Graphic artist
1987	Aliens: Alien 2	Graphic artist
1987	Cleopatra no Mahō	Graphic artist
1987	Nakayama Miho no Tokimeki High School	Graphic artist
1987	Final Fantasy	Graphic artist
1988	Hanjuku Hero	Graphic artist
1989	Square's Tom Sawyer	Graphic artist
1989	The Final Fantasy Legend	Graphic artist, scenario, sound effects
1990	Final Fantasy III	Sound effects
1990	Rad Racer II	Sound effects
1991	Final Fantasy IV	Lead game designer, scenario
1992	Hanjuku Hero: Aa, Sekaiyo Hanjukunare...!	Battle director, scenario
1994	Live A Live	Director, event design, scenario
1995	Chrono Trigger	Director, scenario
1996	DynamiTracer	Producer
1998	Parasite Eve	Director, planner, scenario
1999	Chocobo Racing	Director, scenario, lyricist
1999	Parasite Eve II	Special advisor
2000	The Bouncer	Director, dramatisation, lyricist
2003	Hanjuku Hero Tai 3D	Director, producer
2004	Egg Monster Hero	Producer
2004	Final Fantasy I & II: Dawn of Souls	Producer, game design
2005	Hanjuku Hero 4: 7-Jin no Hanjuku Hero	Director, producer
2005	Final Fantasy IV Advance	Supervisor
2005	Musashi: Samurai Legend	Producer
2006	Mario Hoops 3-on-3	Senior producer
2007	Final Fantasy IV DS	Director, executive producer
2008	Final Fantasy IV: The After Years	Producer, game design, scenario
2008	Nanashi no Game	Executive producer
2009	Final Fantasy: The 4 Heroes of Light	Director, scenario
2011	Ikenie no Yoru	Co-director
2011	Final Fantasy IV: The Complete Collection	Supervisor
2012	Final Fantasy Dimensions	Producer, game design, scenario
2012	Demons' Score	Producer
2015	Final Fantasy Dimensions II	General director, game design, scenario
2015	Holy Dungeon	Writer
2017	Itadaki Street: Dragon Quest and Final Fantasy 30th Anniversary	Final Fantasy character supervisor
2019	Oninaki	Creative producer
2022	Live A Live (Remake)	Producer, scenario, lyricist
