= Rydia =

Fictional character

- Final Fantasy character
- Rydia concept art by Yoshitaka Amano
- First game: Final Fantasy IV (1991)
- Designed by: Yoshitaka Amano
- Voiced by: EN: Caroline Macey; JA: Noriko Shitaya

Rydia of Mist (ミストのリディア, Misuto no Ridia) is a fictional character in the Final Fantasy series. She appears in Final Fantasy IV (Note: The original English release of Final Fantasy IV is called Final Fantasy II.) as one of its protagonists. She is able to summon entities, as can others from her village. She was created by Yoshitaka Amano. Her design in Final Fantasy IV: The After Years was controversial, resulting in it being censored for an international release.

She is the daughter of a summoner from the village of Mist. Her mother summons the Mist Dragon, who protagonist Cecil Harvey and his ally Kain Highwind killed in self defense. Upon the death of the Mist Dragon, Rydia’s mother also perishes. Rydia joins Cecil after he inadvertently destroys her village, not knowing that a package he was delivering was meant to destroy it. She is originally cold towards Cecil, although he would apologize and promises to protect her from harm. Rydia has received generally positive reception and is considered a fan favorite. She is considered one of the best Final Fantasy characters, and her outfit and hair design is considered iconic.

== Concept and creation ==
Rydia's design was created by Final Fantasy artist Yoshitaka Amano. Her outfit design in Final Fantasy IV: The After Years was changed for international releases in order to be less revealing. She is a powerful summoner. She is voiced by Noriko Shitaya in Japanese and Caroline Macey in English.

== Appearances ==
Rydia is one of the protagonists in Final Fantasy IV. When Cecil and Kain travel through the Mist Cave to reach Mist, they kill the Mist Dragon that was summoned to protect the village. As Eidolons are directly linked to their Summoner, Cecil and Kain inadvertently kill Rydia's mother in the process. They also set the entire village on fire by inadvertently releasing a Bomb Ring. Rydia becomes enraged when she learns of their actions, using Titan to cause an earthquake that separates them but injuring herself in the process. Cecil takes her to Kaipo, and when she regains her senses, she initially cannot forgive him, although she does agree to join him after he defends her from some Baron soldiers. Later, Rydia is swallowed by the Eidolon Leviathan and taken to the Feymarch, the Land of the Eidolons which Leviathan rules alongside his Queen, Ashura. Due to the different flow of time in the Feymarch, she physically matures during her stay despite being gone only a short time in the real world. Having mastered summoning and black magic at the expense of white magic, she saves Cecil from Golbez's Shadow Dragon in the Dwarven Castle's Crystal Room and rejoins the party for the rest of the story. At the end of the game, she returns to the Land of Eidolons.

During Interlude, Rydia is impersonated by a mysterious summoner that attacks Cecil and his friends. The real Rydia appears near the end of the game, saving their lives. At the beginning of The After Years, Ashura teleports Rydia to the real world moments before the Maenad appears and turns Ashura and Leviathan into stone. After helping her old friends save the planet, Rydia decides to rebuild Mist with the cooperation of Cecil and others and also becomes the adoptive mother of the child Maenad Cuore.

Rydia also appears in the rhythm game Theatrhythm Final Fantasy as a character representing Final Fantasy IV.

== Reception ==
Rydia has received generally positive reception and has been recognized as a fan favorite by GamesRadar. Ali Rapp of Game Informer praised her design, calling it beautiful and iconic; she cited Rydia's outfit and hair as part of why she is so recognizable. Her outfit has received positive reception, though it was controversial back around release in North America. Maddy Myers for Paste magazine was not sure whether she liked her outfit, but still found it memorable. She called her green hair beautiful. Marc Nix of IGN ranked her the 15th best Final Fantasy character. He discussed her sprite, which he felt was a particularly striking design in comparison to earlier Final Fantasy sprites, as well as how "surprisingly tragic" her story was for a game of its era. IGN readers ranked her the 10th best Final Fantasy character.

Andy Corrigan of IGN praised a moment where she struggles with the trauma of fire due to her home being destroyed by it and being needed to use fire magic to melt a wall of ice. He found this believable, and a moment that stuck with him. Sophia Tong of GamesRadar+ regarded her as her favorite role-playing game party member due to her personality and power. Jedediah H. identified her as one of his favorite characters from his youth, holding her so highly due to her maturity in spite of her age. Chad Concelmo for Destructoid regarded Rydia's return as an adult as one of the "best surprises" in the game and one of his favorites in video games. He notes that it "never really happened" that a character ages in a game and praises the appearance of the Mist Dragon as contributing to the significance of Rydia's return.
