= Final Fantasy IV =

1991 video game

- Box art of the original Super Famicom (Japanese) release
- Developer: Square
- Publishers: Square: Super NES; Square; PlayStation; JP: Square; NA: Square Electronic Arts; PAL: Sony Computer Entertainment; Game Boy Advance; JP: Square Enix; WW: Nintendo
- Director: Hironobu Sakaguchi
- Producer: Masafumi Miyamoto
- Designer: Takashi Tokita
- Programmer: Ken Narita
- Artist: Yoshitaka Amano
- Writers: Takashi Tokita; Hironobu Sakaguchi
- Composer: Nobuo Uematsu
- Series: Final Fantasy
- Platform: Super Nintendo Entertainment System: PlayStation; WonderSwan Color; Game Boy Advance; FOMA 903i / 703i; PlayStation Portable; iOS; Android; Windows; Nintendo Switch; PlayStation 4; Xbox Series X/S
- Release: July 19, 1991: Super NES; JP: July 19, 1991; JP: October 29, 1991 (Easy Type); NA: November 23, 1991; PlayStation; JP: March 21, 1997; NA: June 28, 2001; EU: February 27, 2002; WonderSwan Color; JP: March 29, 2002; Game Boy Advance; NA: December 12, 2005; JP: December 15, 2005; EU: June 2, 2006; i-mode; JP: October 5, 2009; EZweb; JP: December 10, 2009; Yahoo!; JP: January 13, 2010; Final Fantasy IV: The Complete Collection; PlayStation Portable; JP: March 24, 2011; NA: April 19, 2011; EU: April 21, 2011; AU: April 28, 2011; Pixel Remaster; Android, iOS, Windows; WW: September 8, 2021; Nintendo Switch, PlayStation 4; WW: April 19, 2023 Xbox Series X/S; WW: September 26, 2024
- Genre: Role-playing
- Modes: Single-player, multiplayer

Final Fantasy IV, (Note: Japanese: ファイナルファンタジーIV, Hepburn: Fainaru Fantajī Fō) titled Final Fantasy II in its initial North American release, is a 1991 role-playing video game developed and published by Square for the Super Nintendo Entertainment System. It is the fourth main installment of the Final Fantasy series.

The game's story follows Cecil Harvey, a dark knight, as he tries to prevent the sorcerer Golbez from seizing powerful crystals and destroying the world. Cecil is joined on this quest by a frequently changing group of allies. Final Fantasy IV introduced innovations that became staples of the Final Fantasy series and role-playing games in general. Its "Active Time Battle" system was used in five subsequent Final Fantasy games and, unlike prior games in the series, Final Fantasy IV gave each character their own unchangeable character class—although at a few points in the story, members of the cast change or evolve their vocation to suit the narrative.

Final Fantasy IV has been ported to several other platforms with varying differences. A 3D remake of the same name was released for the Nintendo DS in 2007. The game was re-titled Final Fantasy II during its initial release outside Japan as the actual Final Fantasy II and Final Fantasy III had not been released outside Japan at the time. All later localizations of Final Fantasy IV (aside from the Wii Virtual Console), which began to appear after Final Fantasy VII (released worldwide under that title), used the original title.

The various incarnations of the game have sold more than four million copies worldwide. A sequel, Final Fantasy IV: The After Years, was released for Japanese mobile phones in 2008, and worldwide via the Wii Shop Channel on June 1, 2009. In 2011, both Final Fantasy IV and The After Years were released for the PlayStation Portable as part of the compilation Final Fantasy IV: The Complete Collection, which also included a new game, set between the two; Final Fantasy IV: Interlude. Ports of the Nintendo DS remake were released for iOS in 2012, for Android in 2013 and for Windows in 2014. Another enhanced port of Final Fantasy IV was released as part of the Final Fantasy Pixel Remaster compilation series for iOS, Android and Windows in 2021, for Nintendo Switch and PlayStation 4 in 2023, and for Xbox Series X/S in 2024.

Final Fantasy IV was well received and was praised for its graphics, story, characters, and soundtrack. It is often regarded as one of the greatest video games of all time. Many critics have noted that it pioneered many now common console role-playing game features, including the concept of dramatic storytelling in an RPG.

== Gameplay ==
A battle scene from the Super NES version of the game: the party engages a Blue Dragon.

In Final Fantasy IV, the player controls a large cast of characters and completes quests to advance the story. Characters move and interact with people and objects on a field map, which may represent a variety of settings, such as towers, caves, and forests. Travel between areas occurs on the overworld. The player can use towns to replenish strength, buy equipment, and discover clues about their next destination. Conversely, the player fights monsters at random intervals on the overworld and in dungeons. In battle, the player has the option to fight, use magic or an item, retreat, change character positions, parry, or pause. Certain characters have special abilities. The game was the first in the series to allow the player to control up to five characters in their party; previous games had limited the party to four.

Player characters and monsters have hit points (HP), with the characters' HP captioned below the main battle screen. Attacks reduce remaining HP until none are left, at which point the character faints or the monster dies. If all characters are defeated, the game must be restored from a saved game file. The player can restore the characters' hit points by having them sleep in an inn or use items in the party's inventory, such as potions, as well as using healing magic spells. Equipment (such as swords and armor) bought in towns or found in dungeons can be used to increase damage inflicted on monsters or minimize damage received. The player can choose whether characters appear on the front line of a battle or in the back. A character's placement impacts damage received and inflicted depending on the type of attack.

Final Fantasy IV introduced Square's Active Time Battle (ATB) system, which differed from the turn-based designs of previous RPGs. The ATB system centers on the player inputting orders for the characters in real time during battles. The system was used in many subsequent Square games.

Each character has certain strengths and weaknesses; for instance, a strong magic user may have low defense, while a physical fighter may have low agility. Like other Final Fantasy games, characters gain new, more powerful abilities with battle experience. Magic is classified as either "White" for healing and support; "Black" for offense; or "Summon" (or "call") for summoning monsters to attack or carry out specialized tasks. A fourth type, "Ninjutsu", consists of support and offensive magic and is available to only one character. Magic users, who account for eight of the twelve playable characters, gain magic spells at preprogrammed experience levels or fixed story events. The game includes balanced point gains, items, and rewards to eliminate long sessions of grinding. Due to the Super NES' greater processing power, Final Fantasy IV contains improved graphics when compared to previous Final Fantasy titles, all of which were released on the NES. The game employs the Super NES' Mode 7 technology to give enhanced magic spell visuals and to make airship travel more dramatic by scaling and tilting the ground for a bird's eye view.

== Plot ==
=== Setting ===
Most of Final Fantasy IV takes place on Earth, also known as the Blue Planet, which consists of a surface world (or Overworld), inhabited by humans, and an underground world (or Underworld), inhabited by the Dwarves. An artificial moon orbits the planet, upon which the Lunarians live. The Lunarians are a race of beings originally from a world which was destroyed, becoming the asteroid belt surrounding the Blue Planet, and are identified by a moon-shape crest on their foreheads. They created the artificial moon, resting until a time when they believe their kind can co-exist with humans. A second, natural moon orbits the Blue Planet as well, although it is never visited in the game.

=== Characters ===
Final Fantasy IV offers twelve playable characters, each with a unique, unchangeable character class. During the game, the player can have a total of five, or fewer, characters in the party at any given time. The main character, Cecil Harvey, is a dark knight and the captain of the Red Wings, an elite air force unit of the kingdom of Baron. He serves the king alongside his childhood friend Kain Highwind, the commander of the Dragoons. Rosa Farrell is a white mage and archer, as well as Cecil's love interest. The Red Wings' airships were constructed by Cecil's friend, the engineer Cid Pollendina.

During his quest, Cecil is joined by others, including Rydia, a young summoner from the village of Mist; Tellah, a legendary sage; Edward Chris von Muir, the prince of Damcyan who is a bard as well as the husband of Tellah's daughter Anna; Yang Fang Leiden, the head of the monks of Fabul; Palom and Porom, a black mage and a white mage, twin apprentices from the magical village of Mysidia; Edward "Edge" Geraldine, the ninja prince of Eblan; and Fusoya, the guardian of the Lunarians during their long sleep.

Zemus is the main antagonist of the game. He is a Lunarian who wishes to destroy the human race so that his people can populate the earth. He uses evil wizard Golbez to do this by controlling him and Kain with his psychic powers to activate the Giant of Babil, a huge machine created to carry out the genocide and take over the world.

=== Story ===
The Red Wings attack the city of Mysidia to steal its Water Crystal and return to the Kingdom of Baron. Afterward, when Cecil, Captain of the Red Wings, questions the king's motives, the king strips him of his rank and sends him with Kain, his friend and Captain of the Dragoons, to deliver a ring to the Village of Mist. There, Kain and Cecil watch in horror as monsters burst forth from inside the ring and lay waste to the village. A young girl, Rydia, is the only survivor and, in anger, summons a monster named Titan. This monster causes an earthquake, separating Cecil and Kain. Cecil awakens afterward and takes the wounded Rydia to a nearby inn. Baron soldiers come for Rydia, but Cecil defends her, and she joins him on his journey.

It is revealed that Rosa, Cecil's love interest, had followed him and is extremely ill with a fever. Soon after this, Cecil and Rydia meet Tellah, who is going to Damcyan Castle to retrieve his eloping daughter, Anna. However, Anna is killed when the Red Wings bomb the castle. Edward, Anna's lover and the prince of Damcyan, explains that the Red Wings' new commander, Golbez, did this to steal the Fire Crystal for Baron, as they had stolen the Water Crystal from Mysidia. Tellah leaves the party to exact revenge on Golbez for Anna's death. After finding a cure for Rosa, the party decides to go to Fabul to protect the Wind Crystal. On the way there, they meet Master Yang, a warrior monk serving the kingdom and protecting the crystal. The Red Wings attack Fabul, and Kain reappears as one of Golbez's servants. He attacks and defeats Cecil; when Rosa intervenes, Golbez kidnaps her and Kain takes the crystal. On the way back to Baron, the party is attacked by Leviathan and separated.

Cecil awakes alone near Mysidia. When he enters the town, he finds its residents deeply resentful of him for the earlier attack on their town. Through the Elder of Mysidia, he learns that to defeat Golbez, he must climb Mt. Ordeals and become a Paladin. Before embarking on his journey, he is joined by the twin mages, Palom and Porom. On the mountain, he encounters Tellah, who is searching for the forbidden spell Meteor to defeat Golbez. After defeating the fiend Scarmiglione and casting aside the darkness within himself, Cecil becomes a Paladin, while Tellah learns the secret of Meteor. Upon reaching Baron, the party discovers an amnesiac Yang and returns him to his senses. The party then confronts the King, only to discover that he is an imposter and one of Golbez's minions, Cagnazzo. After defeating him, Cid arrives and takes them to one of his airships, the Enterprise. On the way, the party enters a room booby-trapped by Cagnazzo, where Palom and Porom sacrifice themselves to save Cecil, Tellah, Cid, and Yang.

On the airship, Kain appears and demands Cecil retrieve the final crystal in exchange for Rosa's life, which the party obtains with assistance from a bedridden Edward. Kain then leads the party to the Tower of Zot, where Rosa is imprisoned. At the tower's summit, Golbez takes the crystal and attempts to flee. Tellah casts Meteor to stop Golbez, sacrificing his life in the process, but the spell only weakens Golbez and ends his mind control of Kain. Kain helps Cecil rescue Rosa and defeat Barbariccia, another fiend, before Rosa teleports the party out of the collapsing tower to Baron.

In Baron, Kain reveals that Golbez must also obtain four subterranean "Dark Crystals" to reach the Moon. The party travels to the underworld and encounters the Dwarves, who are currently fighting the Red Wings. They defeat Golbez thanks to Rydia's sudden appearance; she is now a young woman after her time in Feymarch, the home of the Eidolons. However, the party ultimately fails to prevent Golbez from stealing the Dwarves' crystal. With the Dwarves' help, they enter the Tower of Babil to retrieve the crystals Golbez has stored there, only to find they have been moved to a surface portion of the tower. Yang later sacrifices himself in order to stop the tower's cannons from firing on the Dwarves (though he's later revealed to have survived). After escaping a trap set by Golbez, the party flees the underworld aboard the Enterprise, with Cid sacrificing himself to reseal the passage between the two worlds and to prevent the Red Wings from continuing their pursuit. The party, now joined by Edge, the prince of Eblan, travels back to the Tower of Babil in order to take back the stolen crystals and battle Rubicante, the last of the fiends. Upon reaching the crystal room, however, the party falls through a trapdoor into the underworld. After meeting the dwarves again and finding Cid alive, the party sets out to retrieve the eighth crystal before Golbez can. After obtaining the crystal, Golbez appears and reveals he still controls Kain, then takes the crystal for himself. After learning of the Lunar Whale, a ship designed to take travelers to and from the moon, the party returns to Mysidia where the town's Elder and mages summon the ship.

Arriving on the Moon, the party meets the sage Fusoya, who explains that Cecil's father was a Lunarian. Fusoya also explains that a Lunarian named Zemus plans to destroy life on the Blue Planet so that the Lunarians can take over, using Golbez to summon the Giant of Babil, a colossal robot. The party returns to Earth and the forces of the two worlds attack the Giant, including Palom and Porom, who have been revived. After the party breaks the robot, Golbez and Kain confront them, but Fusoya breaks Zemus' control over Golbez, releasing Kain. Cecil learns that Golbez is his older brother. Golbez and Fusoya head to the Moon's core to defeat Zemus, and Cecil's party follows. In the Moon's core, the party witnesses Golbez and Fusoya kill Zemus, but then quickly fall to an evil spirit named Zeromus, the embodiment of all of Zemus' hatred and rage. Back on Earth, the Elder of Mysidia entreats all of Cecil's allies and friends to pray for the party, which gives Cecil and his allies the strength to fight and destroy Zeromus. Following the battle, Fusoya and Golbez opt to leave Earth with the moon. Cecil, having accepted the truth, acknowledges Golbez as his brother and bids him farewell.

During the epilogue, most of the cast reunites to celebrate Cecil and Rosa's wedding and their coronation as Baron's new king and queen, while Kain is seen atop Mount Ordeals, having vowed to atone for his misdeeds.

== Development ==
After completing Final Fantasy III in 1990, Square planned to develop two Final Fantasy games—one for the Famicom and the other for the forthcoming Super Famicom, to be known as Final Fantasy IV and V respectively. Due to financial and scheduling constraints, Square dropped plans for the Famicom game and continued development of the Super Famicom version, retitled Final Fantasy IV. A mock-up screenshot of the cancelled title was produced for a Japanese magazine, but little other information exists about it. Kaoru Moriyama, a former public relations publicist and translator for Squaresoft, affirms that no actual coding for the game was done and that "It was only on paperwork". Series creator and director Hironobu Sakaguchi also concurred at the time. However, Clyde Mandelin has noted that some Japanese blogs claims that Sakaguchi later said in an interview that the Famicom version was actually approximately 80% complete and certain ideas were reused for the Super Famicom version; the interview remains unverified.

Final Fantasy IV was lead designer Takashi Tokita's first project at Square as a full-time employee. Before this, Tokita wanted a career as a theater actor, but working on the game made him decide to become a "great creator" of video games. Initially Hiromichi Tanaka, the main designer of Final Fantasy III, was also involved in the development of the game. However, Tanaka wanted to create a seamless battle system that had no separate battle screen and was not menu-driven, and since Final Fantasy IV was not going in that direction, he changed development teams to work on the action RPG Secret of Mana instead. According to Tanaka, he originally wanted the title to have a "more action-based, dynamic overworld" but it "wound up not being" Final Fantasy IV anymore, instead becoming a separate project that eventually became Seiken Densetsu 2 (Secret of Mana), which was codenamed "Chrono Trigger" during development. The development team of Final Fantasy IV contained 14 people in total, and the game was completed in roughly one year.

Initial ideas were contributed by Sakaguchi, including the entire story and the name of Baron's royal air force, the "Red Wings". The Active Time Battle (ATB) system was conceived and designed by Hiroyuki Ito when he was inspired while watching a Formula One race and seeing racers pass each other at different speeds. This gave him the idea of different speed values for the individual characters. The system was developed by Kazuhiko Aoki, Ito and Akihiko Matsui. As the game's lead designer, Tokita wrote the scenario and contributed pixel art. He said that there was a lot of pressure and that the project would not have been completed if he did not work diligently on it. According to Tokita, Final Fantasy IV was designed with the best parts of the previous three installments in mind: the job system of Final Fantasy III, the focus on story of the second game, and the four elemental bosses acting as "symbols for the game" as in the first installment. Other influences include Dragon Quest II. The themes of the game were to go "from darkness to light" with Cecil, a focus on family and friendship among the large and diverse cast, and the idea that "brute strength alone isn't power". Tokita feels that Final Fantasy IV is the first game in the series to really pick up on drama, and the first Japanese RPG to feature deep characters and plot.

The game's script had to be reduced to one fourth of its original length due to cartridge storage limits, but Tokita made sure only "unnecessary dialogue" was cut, rather than actual story elements. As the graphical capacities of the Super Famicom allowed regular series character designer Yoshitaka Amano to make more elaborate character designs than in the previous installments, with the characters' personalities already evident from the images, Tokita felt the reduced script length improved the pacing of the game. Still, he acknowledges that some parts of the story were "unclear" or were not "looked at in depth" until later ports and remakes. One of the ideas not included, due to time and space constraints, was a dungeon near the end of the game where each character would have to progress on their own—this dungeon would only be included in the Game Boy Advance version of the game, as the Lunar Ruins.

=== Music ===
The score of Final Fantasy IV was written by longtime series composer Nobuo Uematsu. Uematsu has noted that the process of composing was excruciating, involving trial and error and requiring the sound staff to spend several nights in sleeping bags at Square's headquarters. His liner notes were humorously signed as being written at 1:30 AM "in the office, naturally". Additionally, the release of ActRaiser and its soundtrack by Yuzo Koshiro heavily inspired the team to completely reassess and rework the game's sound design at the eleventh hour of development to give a more orchestral feel. The score was well received; reviewers have praised the quality of the composition despite the limited medium. The track "Theme of Love" has even been taught to Japanese school children as part of the music curriculum. Uematsu continues to perform certain pieces in his Final Fantasy concert series.

Three albums of music from Final Fantasy IV have been released in Japan. The first album, Final Fantasy IV: Original Sound Version, was released on June 14, 1991, and contains 44 tracks from the game. The second album, Final Fantasy IV: Celtic Moon, was released on October 24 the same year, and contains a selection of tracks from the game, arranged and performed by Celtic musician Máire Breatnach. Lastly, Final Fantasy IV Piano Collections, an arrangement of tracks for solo piano performed by Toshiyuki Mori, was released on April 21, 1992, and began the Piano Collections trend for each successive Final Fantasy game. Several tracks have appeared on Final Fantasy compilation albums produced by Square, including The Black Mages and Final Fantasy: Pray. Independent but officially licensed releases of Final Fantasy IV music have been orchestrated by such groups as Project Majestic Mix, which focuses on arranging video game music. Selections also appear on Japanese remix albums, called dōjin music, and on English remixing websites such as OverClocked ReMix.

=== North American localization ===
Because the previous two installments of the Final Fantasy series had not been localized and released in North America at the time, Final Fantasy IV was distributed as Final Fantasy II to maintain naming continuity. This remained the norm until the release of Final Fantasy VII in North America (after the release of Final Fantasy VI under the title of Final Fantasy III) and subsequent releases of the original Final Fantasy II and III on various platforms. The game has since gone under the title Final Fantasy IV in all subsequent ports (sans the Wii Virtual Console).

The English localization of Final Fantasy IV retains the storyline, graphics, and sound of the original, but the developers significantly reduced the difficulty for beginning gamers. Square was worried that western fans would find it difficult to adjust to the game's complexity due to not having played the previous two entries, so decreased the overall depth considerably. Other changes include the removal of overt Judeo-Christian religious references and certain potentially objectionable graphics. For example, the magic spell "Holy" was renamed "White", and all references to prayer were eliminated; the Tower of Prayers in Mysidia was renamed the Tower of Wishes. Direct references to death were also omitted, although several characters clearly die during the course of the game. The translation was changed in accordance with Nintendo of America's censorship policies (at a time before the formation of the ESRB and its rating system).

== Re-releases ==
In addition to its original release, Final Fantasy IV has been remade into many different versions. The first of these was Final Fantasy IV Easy Type, a modified version of the game which was released for the Super Famicom in Japan. In this version, the attack powers of weapons have been enhanced, while the protective abilities of certain spells and pieces of armor are amplified. The American release is partially based on Easy Type.

A PlayStation port debuted in Japan on March 21, 1997. Ported by Tose and published by Square, it was designed and directed by Kazuhiko Aoki, supervised by Fumiaki Fukaya, and produced by Akihiro Imai. This version is nearly identical to the original game, although minor tweaks introduced in the Easy Type are present. The most notable changes in the PlayStation release are the inclusion of a full motion video opening and ending sequence, the ability to move quickly in dungeons and towns by holding the Cancel button, and the option of performing a "memo" save anywhere on the world map. This version was released a second time in Japan in March 1999 as part of the Final Fantasy Collection package, which also included the PlayStation versions of Final Fantasy V and VI. Fifty-thousand limited edition copies of the collection were also released and included a Final Fantasy-themed alarm clock.

The PlayStation port was later released with Chrono Trigger in North America as part of Final Fantasy Chronicles in 2001 and with Final Fantasy V in Europe and Australia as part of Final Fantasy Anthology in 2002. The English localizations feature a new translation, although certain translated lines from the previous localization by Kaoru Moriyama, such as "You spoony bard!", were kept, as they had become fan favorites. A remake for the WonderSwan Color, with few changes from the PlayStation version, was released in Japan on March 28, 2002. Character sprites and backgrounds were graphically enhanced through heightened details and color shading.

Final Fantasy IV was ported again by Tose for the Game Boy Advance and published as Final Fantasy IV Advance (ファイナルファンタジーIVアドバンス, Fainaru Fantajī Fō Adobansu). It was released in North America by Nintendo of America on December 12, 2005; in Japan by Square Enix on December 15; in Australia on February 23, 2006; and in Europe on June 2. In Japan, a special version was available which included a limited edition Game Boy Micro with a themed face plate featuring artwork of Cecil and Kain. The enhanced graphics from the WonderSwan Color port were further improved, and minor changes were made to the music. The localization team revised the English translation, improving the flow of the story, and restoring plot details absent from the original. The abilities that were removed from the original North American release were re-added, while spells were renamed to follow the naming conventions of the Japanese version, changing "Bolt2" to "Thundara" for example. A new cave at Mt. Ordeals was added featuring powerful armor and stronger weapons for five additional characters, as was the Lunar Ruins, a dungeon accessible only at the end of the game.

The game was remade with 3D graphics for the Nintendo DS as part of the Final Fantasy series' 20th anniversary, and was released as Final Fantasy IV in Japan on December 20, 2007, in North America on July 22, 2008, and in Europe on September 5. The remake adds a number of features not present in the original, such as voice acting, minigames, and some changes to the basic gameplay. The game was developed by Matrix Software, the same team responsible for the Final Fantasy III DS remake, and was supervised by members of the original development team: Takashi Tokita served as executive producer and director, Tomoya Asano as producer and Hiroyuki Ito as battle designer. Animator Yoshinori Kanada storyboarded the new cutscenes.

The original version of the game was released on the Wii Virtual Console in Japan on August 4, 2009, and in PAL regions on June 11, 2010. An enhanced port for i-mode compatible phones was released in Japan on October 5, 2009. It retains features introduced in the WonderSwan Color and Game Boy Advance ports, while incorporating enhanced character graphics on par with those found in The After Years, as well as an exclusive "extra dungeon" available after completing the game.

Along with Final Fantasy IV: The After Years, the game was released for the PlayStation Portable as part of the compilation Final Fantasy IV: The Complete Collection. This version used updated 2D graphics, as opposed to the 3D graphics seen in the DS remake. The collection also includes a new episode called Final Fantasy IV: Interlude, which takes place between the original game and The After Years. Masashi Hamauzu arranged the main theme for the game. It was released worldwide in April 2011, with the exception of Japan in March. The PlayStation port was re-released as part of the Final Fantasy 25th Anniversary Ultimate Box Japanese package in December 2012.

In December 2012, the Nintendo DS version of Final Fantasy IV was released for the iOS and Android (June 2013) mobile platforms, introducing an optional easier difficulty level. Final Fantasy IV was also released for Windows in September 2014, with no prior advertisement.

The PlayStation version was released as a PSOne Classic in Japan on June 27, 2012, compatible with PlayStation 3, PlayStation Vita and PlayStation Portable.

The Super Famicom version was released on the Wii U Virtual Console in Japan on February 19, 2014, while the Game Boy Advance version was released on April 13, 2016.

== Reception ==
Reception

Aggregate scores
Aggregator	Score
GameRankings	SNES: 89% GBA: 83%
Metacritic	GBA: 85/100; PC: 83/100

Review scores
Publication	Score
1Up.com	GBA: A−
Dragon	SNES: 4/5
Electronic Gaming Monthly	SNES: 8/10, 9/10, 7/10, 8/10
Famitsu	SNES: 8/10, 7/10, 9/10, 7/10 (Note: This rating refers to the "Easy Type" release of the game.)
GameSpot	GBA: 8.3/10
GameSpy	GBA: 4.5/5
IGN	GBA: 8.6/10; WII: 8/10
NGC Magazine	GBA: 87%
PALGN	GBA: 8.5/10
RPGFan	SNES: 91%
TouchArcade	iOS: 4.5/5
Nintendojo	SNES: 10/10

Awards
Publication	Award
Electronic Gaming Monthly	Best RPG Video Game
Famitsu Best Hit Game Awards	'91 Best Hit Game Awards

The game received positive reviews upon release. Famitsu's panel of four reviewers gave it ratings of 9, 9, 10, and 8, adding up to an overall score of 36 out of 40, one of the highest scores it awarded to any game in 1991, second only to The Legend of Zelda: A Link to the Past. In its November 1991 issue, Nintendo Power proclaimed it set a "new standard of excellence" for role-playing games. They praised the battles as being "more interesting than in previous RPGs" because the player "must make snap decisions" and the "enemies don't wait for you to make up your mind" and concluded that the "story, graphics, play and sound will keep fans riveted". Electronic Gaming Monthly' panel of four reviewers gave it ratings of 8, 9, 7, and 8, out of 10. In its December 1991 issue, Ed Semrad, who gave it a 9, wrote that "Square has just redefined what the ultimate RPG should be like", noting the "spectacular Mode 7 effects, outstanding graphics and a quest unequalled in a video game", concluding that it "makes use of all the Super NES has to offer" and is "the best made to date!" Ken Williams (as Sushi-X), who gave it an 8, said that it is "a totally awesome RPG", the "storyline is actually coherent and the plot moves along with a combination of speaking sequences and battles". On the other hand, Martin Alessi, who disliked role-playing games, gave it a 7. They gave the game an award for 1991's Best RPG Video Game, stating that the "Mode 7 is great here and Square does a spectacular job in using it to zoom in and away from the planet" and that the "quest is huge and also one of the most difficult ever attempted in a video game".

GamePro rated it a perfect 5.0 out of 5 in all five categories (graphics, sound, control, fun factor, and challenge) in its March 1992 issue. The reviewer Monty Haul stated that it "truly redefines the standards for fantasy adventure games", proclaiming that "one-dimensional characters, needless hack 'em combat, and linear gameplay will be things of the past if other RPGs learn a lesson or two from this cart", concluding that it "is one small step for Square Soft, and one giant leap for SNES role-playing games". In the November 1993 issue of Dragon, Sandy Petersen gave it an "Excellent" rating. He criticized the "stylized" combat system and the graphics as "inferior" to Zelda, but praised how every "spell has a different on-screen effect" and the difficulty for being "just about right" where bosses "nearly beat you every time" unlike other RPGs such as Ultima where enough "adventuring" makes it possible to "trash" enemies "with ease". He praised the "great" music, preferring it over Zelda, stating what it "lacks in graphics, it more than makes up for in sound". He praised the story in particular, noting that, in a departure from other RPGs where the party always "sticks together through thick and thin", the characters have their own motives for joining and leaving the group, with one that "even betrays" them. He said that it is like "following the storyline of a fantasy novel", comparing it to The Lord of the Rings and Man in the Iron Mask, concluding that, because "the characters often spoke up for themselves", he "got much more attached" to the party "than in any other computer game".

Retrospectively, major reviewers have called Final Fantasy IV one of the greatest video games of all time, noting that it pioneered many now common console role-playing game features, including the concept of dramatic storytelling in an RPG. In a 1997 retrospective, GamePro credited it as "the first game where a turn-based combat system allowed you to change weapons, cast spells, and use items during a battle, and it featured some of the most exciting villains to date". Reviewers have praised the game for its graphics, gameplay and score, and have noted that Final Fantasy IV was one of the first role-playing games to feature a complex, involving plot. However, some retrospective reviews have criticized the game's original English-language translation.

It has been included in various lists of the best games of all time. Nintendo Power included it in the "100 Greatest Nintendo Games" lists, placing it ninth in 1997's issue 100, and twenty-eighth in 2005's issue 200. IGN included it in its top 100 lists of the greatest games of all time, ranking it #9 in 2003, as the highest-ranking RPG, and at #26 in 2005, as the highest rated Final Fantasy title on the list. In 2007, it was ranked at #55, behind Final Fantasy VI and Final Fantasy Tactics. Famitsu released a reader poll in 2006 ranking it as the sixth best game ever made. It was also listed among the best games of all time by Electronic Gaming Monthly in 2001 and 2006, Game Informer in 2001 and 2009, GameSpot in 2005, and GameFAQs in 2005, 2009 and 2014.

Weekly Famitsu gave Final Fantasy Collection a score of 54 out of 60 points, scored by a panel of six reviewers. The Game Boy Advance version, Final Fantasy IV Advance, was met with praise from reviewers, although a few noted the game's graphics do not hold up well to current games, especially when compared to Final Fantasy VI. Reviewers noted that some fans may still nitpick certain errors in the new translation. The Nintendo DS version of the game was praised for its visuals, gameplay changes and new cutscenes. It was a nominee for Best RPG on the Nintendo DS in IGN's 2008 video game awards.

=== Sales ===
Upon release in Japan, Final Fantasy IV sold about 200,000 cartridges on its first day, about 4.5 times less than what Final Fantasy V sold on its first day a year later, no doubt because audiences were hoping for more of the same. The Super Famicom version of Final Fantasy IV went on to sell 1.44 million copies in Japan.

The PlayStation version sold an additional 261,000 copies in Japan in 1997. By March 2003, the game, including the PlayStation and WonderSwan Color remakes, had shipped 2.16 million copies worldwide, with 1.82 million of those copies being shipped in Japan and 340,000 abroad. The Game Boy Advance version of the game sold over 219,000 copies in Japan by the end of 2006. As of 2007, just before the release of the Nintendo DS version, nearly 3 million copies of the game had been sold around the world. By May 2009, the DS version of the game had sold 1.1 million copies worldwide. According to Steam Spy, another 190,000 copies of the PC version were sold by April 2018.

In addition, Final Fantasy Collection, which includes Final Fantasy IV, sold over 400,000 copies in 1999. This makes it the 31st best selling release of that year in Japan.

== Legacy ==
Final Fantasy IV: The After Years, the sequel to Final Fantasy IV, is set seventeen years after the events of the original. The first two chapters of the game were released in Japan in February 2008 for NTT DoCoMo FOMA 903i series phones, and for au WIN BREW series phones in spring. The game revolves around Ceodore, the son of Cecil and Rosa, with most of the original cast members returning, some of whom are featured in more prominent roles than before, among other new characters. After the mobile release, The After Years was released outside Japan, for Wii's WiiWare service. The first two chapters were released in June 2009, in North America and PAL territories, with the additional chapters being released in the following months.

A two-volume novelization of Final Fantasy IV was released in Japan on December 25, 2008.

== See also ==
- List of Square Enix video game franchises
