= Final Fantasy IV (2007 video game) =

2007 role-playing game remake

- North American box art for Nintendo DS release
- Developer: Matrix Software
- Publisher: Square Enix
- Director: Takashi Tokita
- Producer: Tomoya Asano
- Designers: Takashi Tokita; Hiroyuki Ito
- Artist: Akira Oguro
- Composers: Junya Nakano; Kenichiro Fukui
- Series: Final Fantasy
- Platforms: Nintendo DS, iOS, Android, Windows
- Release: DS: JP: December 20, 2007; NA: July 22, 2008; AU: September 4, 2008; EU: September 5, 2008; iOS: WW: December 20, 2012; Android: WW: June 4, 2013; Windows: NA/EU: September 17, 2014; JP: November 6, 2020
- Genre: Role-playing
- Modes: Single-player, multiplayer

Final Fantasy IV (Note: Japanese: ファイナルファンタジーIV, Hepburn: Fainaru Fantajī Fō) is a 2007 role-playing video game developed by Matrix Software and published by Square Enix for the Nintendo DS. It is a remake of Final Fantasy IV, originally known as Final Fantasy II in North America for the SNES. It was released as part of the Final Fantasy series 20th anniversary celebrations on December 20, 2007 in Japan, on July 22, 2008 in North America, and on September 5 in Europe.

The game was developed by Matrix Software, the same team responsible for the 3D Final Fantasy III remake, and was supervised by members of the original development team: Takashi Tokita served as executive producer and director, Tomoya Asano as producer, and Hiroyuki Ito as battle designer. Animator Yoshinori Kanada wrote the new cutscenes.

The game was well received by critics and fans alike; it was praised for being sufficiently faithful to the original while expanding on many gameplay and story elements.

The game was released for iOS on the App Store in 2012, for Android in 2013 and for Windows via Steam in 2014 in the west and in 2020 in Japan with further updates. This port was later released to GOG.com on January 29, 2026.

== Gameplay ==
Cecil walking through Kaipo.

Final Fantasy IV is a turn-based role-playing video game retains the original Active Time Battle System from the initial Super Nintendo release. Similar to the previous remake of Final Fantasy III on the Nintendo DS, the control of stylus is limited and optional in order to retain the same control input while allowing other players to use the Nintendo DS's unique touch control scheme. However, the remake features a new ability system known as the "Augment System", or the "Decant Ability System" (デカントアビリティシステム, Dekanto Abiriti Shisutemu) in the Japanese version. The system allows for certain character-only abilities to be transferred to other characters who did not have them in the original and previous re-releases of Final Fantasy IV. Up to three abilities can be transferred to temporary party members. When leaving the party, temporary characters will yield abilities of their own, the number of which is dependent on how many abilities they were given. There are also other abilities; some scattered around the world, and some that become available after certain story events. This new system entails another new feature: command menu customization. All commands in a character's battle menu, except the "Items" command, can be replaced with augments. This includes individual abilities that are ordinarily contained in a group (e.g. "Curaga" can be added directly to Rosa's command list, rather than only being accessible through the White Magic sub-list). The Augment System was devised to replace the system in Final Fantasy IV Advance where the characters that were temporary in the original version became playable again at a certain point, as the developers felt that this system changed the game too much.

Other exclusive enhancements to the DS version of the game include minigames. Unlike the main game, minigames are stylus-control only. Their function is to increase the power of Rydia's personal Eidolon, Whyt (ポーチカ, Pōchika; Pochika in the Japanese version), who takes her place in the battle line-up, and acts under computer control according to abilities assigned to him by the player. The minigames can be played in either single-player or wireless (not online) multiplayer modes. The game also features a New Game Plus. This allows players to start a new game with certain enhancements, such as rare or secret items and equipment, carried over from a previously completed game. Certain other new features are only available in a New Game Plus, such as hidden bosses on the face of the moon and the summit of Mt. Ordeals. Because of the voice-acted scenes, Namingway cannot change any character's name as he did in the original game. After realizing this, he travels the world, changing his own name to fit each occupation he takes up. Examples of his name changes include "Mappingway" (charting the maps on the lower screen), "Campingway", and "Weddingway". Following Namingway around the world and engaging in his sidequest yields numerous rewards. With the removal of the limit on items that the player can carry, Fat Chocobo no longer stores items, and instead can be called on in order to access the new bestiary and the video and music player, as well as the Whyt minigames.

== Plot ==
The original storyline of Final Fantasy IV is retained, and some of the previously missing script has been worked into the DS version in the form of flashbacks, including Golbez becoming Zemus's pawn and the childhoods of Cecil, Kain, and Rosa.

== Development ==
Similar to Final Fantasy III for the DS, Final Fantasy IV features an opening full motion video sequence with an orchestrated theme song.

The remake was pitched to director and scenario writer of the original version Takashi Tokita by producer Tomoya Asano, who also produced the Final Fantasy III Nintendo DS remake, after its development concluded. Asano wanted to give IV the same remake treatment that III received. Tokita was concerned about remaking the game after the somewhat recent release of IV on the Game Boy Advance but considered the III remake was "impressive" and decided that he wanted IV to receive the same remake treatment while highlighting its enduring appeal and importance in the series.

The official developer blog (maintained by Tomoya Asano) outlined several key features of the remake. As in the original, players can reform their party with whomever they choose as party leader. When the player enters the menu, the party leader will now appear on the bottom screen where the player can read their thoughts about what is happening in the story at that time (the development team suggests players to check this feature often for humorous anecdotes).

Other developer blog entries focused on the art and programming of the game. According to the art director, Matrix tried to make each location of the game feel unique. For example, the desert kingdom of Damcyan has taken on a Middle-Eastern flair, Fabul has been given a Chinese feeling, and Eblan has been given the feeling of a Ninja residence, which was not possible in the Super Famicom edition due to limited data capacity. The game displays more characters and enemies on screen during battle compared to Final Fantasy III, which required the modeling team to reduce the number of polygons per character. The main programmer also suggests that the game is much larger than Final Fantasy III from a data standpoint, and compressing all the data to fit on a 1GB ROM was difficult, largely due to the voice data.

According to director Takashi Tokita, the scenario writer and lead game designer of the original release, three quarters of the original script had been left out of the original Super Famicom version. In a Q&A feature on the official Square Enix Members page, Tokita corrected this by saying that the original story script was never cut, but during the development of the original release, the game's text could not fit and had to be revised to a quarter of its intended size.

The remake features a much higher difficulty level compared to the original version, Tokita highlighted how the game features much more difficult boss attacks and counterattacks and mentioned that the difficulty was increased to make the remake challenging and appealing to veterans of the original game. When the game was ported to smartphones and PCs, it was given a lowered difficulty level named "Normal", with the much harder difficulty of the original Nintendo DS version being renamed "Hard".

=== Music ===
Square Enix held a casting for a vocalist to sing a rendition of Final Fantasy IV's "Theme of Love" composed by Nobuo Uematsu. Megumi Ida was selected from approximately 800 applicants to perform the song "Tsuki no Akari" (月の明り; literally "moonlight"). The song was arranged by Kenichiro Fukui, with the lyrics penned by scenario writer Takashi Tokita. It only appears in the Japanese release of the game, over the ending credits - international versions cut the song in its entirety and replace it with a music track from the game itself.

== Reception ==
Reception

Aggregate scores
Aggregator	Score
GameRankings	DS: 85%
Metacritic	DS: 85/100 iOS: 89/100

Review scores
Publication	Score
Famitsu	35 / 40
GamePro	5/5
GameSpot	9 / 10
GameSpy	4.5/5
GameTrailers	9.2 / 10
GameZone	9 / 10
IGN	8.7 / 10
Nintendo World Report	9.5 / 10
TouchArcade	iOS: 4/5

As of July 2008, the game has sold 612,044 copies in Japan. Worldwide it has sold 1.1 million copies.

Final Fantasy IV was well received by critics. Review aggregator Metacritic reports the game having an average rating of 85/100 for the DS version based on 52 reviews, and the iOS version and average rating of 89/100 based on 6 reviews, both indicating 'generally favorable' reviews. It was a nominee for Best RPG on the Nintendo DS in IGN's 2008 video game awards.

Writing for TechRadar, Christian de Looper and Emma Boyle called the remake one of the best Nintendo DS games they played. Dorkly's Tristan Cooper placed the game at #20 on a list of the best Nintendo DS games and said the remake made Final Fantasy IV feel even more epic. Lifewire's Alex Williams called the game one of the best role-playing games on the Nintendo DS and highlighted its complex, character-driven plot. GameSpot called Final Fantasy IV "easily among the best-looking 3D games on the Nintendo DS", lauding the game as sometimes "in many ways more poignant and impressive than it was all those years ago", ultimately giving the game a 9/10.

== Legacy ==
The remake led to the development of Final Fantasy IV: The After Years as a new direct sequel to Final Fantasy IV featuring 2D sprites like the original version of the game, which Director Takashi Tokita wanted players to play after the remake. Producer Tomoya Asano stated that the experience he obtained by developing the series of Nintendo DS titles started by the remakes of Final Fantasy III and IV culminated in the creation of his original Nintendo 3DS title Bravely Default, which he called the "pinnacle of DS gaming". Additionally, he also mentioned that parts of the experiences served as "the foundation for [his] later HD-2D works".

== See also ==
- List of Square Enix video game franchises
