= Cecil Harvey =

Final Fantasy IV protagonist

- Final Fantasy character
- Promotional art of Cecil Harvey as a Paladin (above) and Dark Knight (below) by Yoshitaka Amano
- First game: Final Fantasy IV (1991)
- Designed by: Kazuko Shibuya (sprites and original character design for the Super Famicom version); Yoshitaka Amano (promotional artworks and character designs for other versions)
- Voiced by: EN: Yuri Lowenthal; JA: Shizuma Hidoshima

Cecil Harvey (Japanese: セシル・ハーヴィ, Hepburn: Seshiru Hāvi) is the protagonist of the 1991 video game Final Fantasy IV. He is a Dark Knight, and spends much of the game grappling with the actions he committed while serving the kingdom of Baron. He eventually overcomes his demons, abandoning his role as a Dark Knight and becoming a Paladin. He has been recognized as a standout protagonist in the Final Fantasy series, with his transformation into a Paladin receiving commentary, particularly as a representation of abandoning violence.

== Appearances ==
Cecil Harvey first appears in 1991's Final Fantasy IV as its protagonist. The game opens with him having successfully stolen the Water Crystal from the town of Mysidia as part of the Red Wings militia, though he expresses doubt about the morality of his mission. He and his friend Kain Highwind are ordered to deliver a package to the village of Mist; they inadvertently kill the mother of a girl named Rydia and discover that the package was a bomb. Rydia attacks them, separating him and Kain, and he and Rydia go together, the latter growing comfortable with him after he protects her.

== Concept and creation ==
Cecil was created for Final Fantasy IV, the first character created for the game. He starts the game as a Dark Knight, but eventually becomes a Paladin over the course of the game. The concept of a Dark Knight changing into a Paladin was a concept implemented at the start of the game's development. When designing Final Fantasy IV, the development team tied the growth of characters to their in-battle abilities, Cecil included.

Cecil is voiced in Japanese in the Nintendo DS remake by Shizuma Hidoshima. He is voiced by Yuri Lowenthal in English in PlayStation Portable video game Dissidia Final Fantasy (2008), with Lowenthal and Hidoshima reprising the role in several subsequent games.

== Reception ==
Cecil has received generally positive reception. In a poll of Japanese players, he ranked ninth among male Final Fantasy characters. Engadget writer Kat Bailey discussed how Cecil defied stereotypes of Japanese role-playing game protagonists, being that he is an established warrior with a wife instead of a teenager. This aspect of his character appealed to Bailey, who noted that she likely would not have cared when she was younger, but because she's thinking of starting a family of her own, him fighting alongside his wife resonates with her.

Cecil's pursuit of redemption, alongside him becoming a Paladin, was Game Informer writer Joe Juba's favorite moment from Final Fantasy IV. He compared this to an earlier scene in the series where the player has to earn class changes for their characters, but noted that the search for atonement helped make it stand out. Game Developer writer Christian Nutt stated that Cecil was one of the first characters to have a "real character arc," which "set the stage for the kind of characters we would see from RPGs from that point forward." GamesRadar+ writer Heidi Kemps agreed with this, saying that Cecil's arc felt real and brought the series to new heights. GamesRadar+ staff felt he was a standout of protagonists, believing that "few heroes have made a journey as personal and stricken with loss" as Cecil went through. They felt that he was one of the most "unquestionably good-hearted characters in the history of Final Fantasy," while also being one of the most mature. They also discussed his relationship with the rest of the cast, feeling that it makes the story more personable.

In the book Queerness in Play, the authors discuss androgyny and masculinity in the series, noting how, in his Dark Knight armor, his strength is built around aggression and self-injury, while his armor emphasizes his "stoicism, loyalty, and emotional reservation." Meanwhile, they argued that his Paladin form emphasized protecting his allies, claiming that by abandoning the "strict, obedient, violent masculinity," he becomes a more complete character.
