= Music of the Parasite Eve series =

Music of the Parasite Eve video game series

The music of the 1998 role-playing video game Parasite Eve, based on the novel of the same name by Hideaki Sena, was composed by Yoko Shimomura, and was one of her early popular successes. The music for its 1999 sequel Parasite Eve II was composed by Naoshi Mizuta. The 2010 spin-off title The 3rd Birthday was composed for by Shimomura, Mitsuto Suzuki and Tsuyoshi Sekito. Shimomura's work was described by herself as experimental, and incorporated multiple musical genres including opera music. The score for Parasite Eve was recorded at the Andora Studios in Los Angeles. For Parasite Eve II, Mizuta spent a year and a half on the project, using the game's scenario and visuals as references and taking inspiration from multiple film genres. It was Mizuta's first project after transferring from Capcom to Square Enix (then Square). For The 3rd Birthday, Shimomura worked with Suzuki and Sekito to create a score reminiscent of Parasite Eve, while Japanese rock band Superfly provided the theme song "Eyes on Me".

The original Parasite Eve Original Soundtrack album was released in May 1998 through DigiCube. Shimomura also produced an arrange album, Parasite Eve Remixes, which was released through DigiCube in July 1998. The soundtrack album for the second game, Parasite Eve II Original Soundtrack, was released through DigiCube in December 1999. It also released in North America through Tokyopop Soundtrax in September 2000. The third game's soundtrack album, The 3rd Birthday Original Soundtrack, released in December 2010 through Square Enix's music label. The first two game's original soundtracks were reissued through Square Enix in January 2010 due to popular demand, and a limited edition combined album titled Parasite Eve I & II Original Soundtrack Box was released alongside them. While some albums have received mixed responses from critics, the music of the Parasite Eve series has generally received positive reviews, with the score for the first game bringing Shimomura international acclaim.

== Series overview ==
The Parasite Eve video game series is based on the 1995 science fiction novel of the same name by Japanese author Hideaki Sena. The role-playing video game Parasite Eve, was released in 1998 for the PlayStation. Billed as a "cinematic RPG", it was developed by a team of Japanese and North American staff with a western release in mind. Its 1999 sequel, the action role-playing game Parasite Eve II, was designed to be similar to games from the Resident Evil survival horror series. While Parasite Eve II did not leave potential for a sequel, the series was brought back in the form of The 3rd Birthday, a 2010 spin-off for the PlayStation Portable. Initially designed for mobile devices, it was shifted onto the PSP and designed as a disconnected game focusing on the series' main protagonist Aya Brea. All three games were primarily developed by Square Enix.

== Parasite Eve ==
=== Parasite Eve Original Soundtrack ===
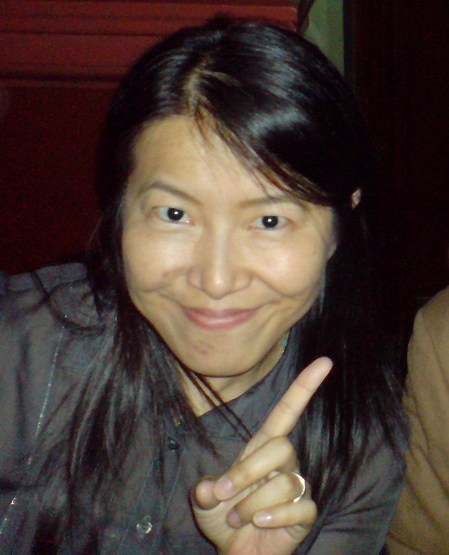
A 2007 photograph of Yoko Shimomura, composer for Parasite Eve and later The 3rd Birthday.

Parasite Eve Original Soundtrack

Soundtrack album by Yoko Shimomura
- Released: May 21, 1998; January 26, 2011 (Reprint)
- Recorded: Andora Studios, Los Angeles
- Length: 1:46:55
- Labels: DigiCube; Square Enix (Reprint)
- Producer: Square Enix

The music for Parasite Eve was composed by Yoko Shimomura, who would later become a well-established video game composer through her work on the Kingdom Hearts series. Additional arrangements were done by Shigeo Tamaru. Despite her previous work as lead composer on Super Mario RPG, Parasite Eve became Shimomura's breakout project and garnered her international fame. During her work on Parasite Eve, Shimomura spent time in the United States, which was where much of the game's staff came from. Because of this, Shimomura remembered the game as her most challenging project. She wanted the music to be experimental, not falling into ambient or techno classifications. One of her main goals was to create something "inorganic" and recognizable as a product of Square Enix (then Square). Until Parasite Eve, Shimomura had written music in a straightforward manner that reflected her then-current state of mind, but this time she restrained herself and took a more "emotionless" approach. She felt that this would best represent the game's atmosphere and Aya's stoic attitude. Ultimately, she felt that Parasite Eve was an experimental work in many ways. Due to its prevalence in the story, Shimomura used opera music, but as typical opera music did not translate well into battle themes, Shimomura added different rhythms: these rhythms were inspired when some of the game's American staff took her to a nightclub and she heard the background music there. The music recording took place at the Andora Studios in Los Angeles.

Parasite Eve was the first of her projects to include a vocal theme, the ending theme "Somnia Memorias". This was because the PlayStation system was the first to have sufficient processing power for this to be possible. For the vocalist, Shimomura avoided using someone well known. "Somnia Memorias" was sung by Shani Rigsbee, while the vocals for the orchestrated versions of "Influence of Deep" and "Se il Mio Amore Sta Vincino" were provided by Judith Siirila. "Somnia Memorias" was translated and adapted from Japanese into Latin by Raul Ferrando, while "Se il Mio Amore Sta Vincino" was translated by Daniella Spagnolo. The lyrics for all vocal pieces were written by Shimomura. The track "I Hear a Voice Asking Me to Awaken" was an arrangement of Wachet auf, ruft uns die Stimme, BWV 140 by Johann Sebastian Bach.

The two-disc album Parasite Eve Original Soundtrack was released through DigiCube on May 21, 1998 under the catalog number SSCX-10020. Due to popular demand from fans, a reprint was issued through the Square Enix label on January 26, 2011 under the catalog number SQEX-10222/3. The music received generally positive reviews from music critics, and helped establish Shimomura as a popular composer with western video game fans.

Disc One
No.	Title	Length
1.	"Primal Eyes"	2:21
2.	"Waiting for Something to Awaken"	1:12
3.	"Overture (from Opera "La Mia Verita")"	2:16
4.	"Se il mio Amore Sta Vincino (Vocalise) – Eva's Aria"	2:06
5.	"Memory I"	0:35
6.	"Gloom and Doom"	2:41
7.	"Theme of Mitochondria"	1:39
8.	"Sotto Voce"	2:07
9.	"Arise Within You"	2:05
10.	"Main Theme (Piano Solo Version)"	2:07
11.	"The Surface of the Water"	2:02
12.	"Memorize of "Aya and Eve""	1:37
13.	"Out of Phase"	4:02
14.	"Urban Noise"	1:52
15.	"Mystery Notes"	1:01
16.	"Influence of Deep"	3:03
17.	"Phrase of Aya"	1:14
18.	"Phrase of Mitochondria"	0:42
19.	"Theme of Aya"	1:34
20.	"Under the Progress"	3:07
21.	"Plosive Attack"	2:19
22.	"Missing Perspective"	3:40
23.	"Memory II"	1:09
24.	"Force Trail"	1:42
25.	"Phrase of Eve"	3:07
26.	"Memory III"	1:14

Disc Two
No.	Title	Length
1.	"Matrix"	2:44
2.	"The Omission of the World"	2:32
3.	"Wheel of Fortune"	3:31
4.	"Kyrie"	2:43
5.	"Across the View"	1:51
6.	"Femmes Fatales"	4:42
7.	"A Piece of Remain"	1:20
8.	"Musica Mundana"	2:13
9.	"U.B."	4:52
10.	"Escape from U.B."	0:54
11.	"Main Theme"	1:49
12.	"Theme of Aya (Reprise)"	1:14
13.	"I Hear a Voice Asking Me to Awaken"	1:54
14.	"Somnia Memorias"	5:58
15.	"Consensus"	1:56
16.	"Someone Calls Me...., Someone Looks for Me......"	1:46
17.	"Main Theme (Orchestral Version)"	7:53
18.	"Influence of Deep – CM Version"	2:43
19.	"Se il mio Amore Sta Vincino – CM Version"	2:05

=== Parasite Eve Remixes ===
Parasite Eve Remixes is a ten-track album, featuring remixed versions of themes from Parasite Eve. The remixes were done by Shimomura, Tamaru, Hidenori Iwasaki and Keichi Takahashi. Multiple DJs also contributed, including Tomo, QUADRA, Dan K, Tribal Masters, Kay Nakayama, and Dummy Run. According to Shimomura, the album came about when someone suggested to her creating full remixes of themes rather than making simple rearrangements. Shimomura was in charge of extending and remixing "Aya's Theme", which was the main theme for Parasite Eve. The album was released through DigiCube on July 30, 1998 under the catalog number SSCX-10023. Reviews of the album were mixed, with critics saying that it would not appeal to many and finding some of the remixes odd, repetitive or overly chaotic.

== Parasite Eve II ==
=== Parasite Eve II Original Soundtrack ===
Parasite Eve II Original Soundtrack

Soundtrack album by Naoshi Mizuta
- Released: December 18, 1999 (Japan); September 12, 2000 (North America); January 26, 2011 (Japanese reprint)
- Length: 2:29:01
- Labels: DigiCube (Japan); Tokyopop Soundtrax (North America); Square Enix (Japanese reprint)
- Producer: Naoshi Mizuta

The music of Parasite Eve II was written, arranged and produced by Naoshi Mizuta. Parasite Eve II was Mizuta's first project as lead composer at Square after transferring from Capcom. He spent a year and a half working on the soundtrack, frequently referencing the game's scenario and visuals. He was also influenced by multiple unspecified films from multiple genres including action films. He matched his music to the scenario, characters and environments, since he desired to stir the players emotions without distracting from the game. Many of his tracks were created on request, but he otherwise had a high amount of creative freedom. Multiple tracks were remixes and rearrangements of Shimomura's original music for Parasite Eve: according to Mizuta, the arrangements were easy due to the original tracks' strength. In a later interview, Mizuta called his work on Parasite Eve II very different from his later work on Final Fantasy XI and The 4 Heroes of Light. Guitar elements for the tracks "Forbidden Power" and "Douglas' Blues" were performed by Tsuyoshi Sekito and Yuji Isogawa respectively. The soundtrack also includes two bonus remixes by Mizuta and Hiroshi Nakajima respectively; Nakajima felt that he intentionally "betrayed" Mizuta's work while creating his remix. Mixing on the game's streamed tracks was done by Kenji Nagashima. Sound samples used in some tracks were taken from the Q Ups Art Sonic Images Library CD release.

Parasite Eve II Original Soundtrack was released through DigiCube on December 18, 1999 under the catalog number SSCX-10038. The soundtrack was released in North America through Tokyopop Soundtrax. This edition was released on September 12, 2000 under the catalog number TPCD-0200-2. Due to popular demand from fans, a reprint was issued through the Square Enix label on January 26, 2011 under the catalog number SQEX-10224/5. Reception of the music was far less positive than for Parasite Eve, with reviewers generally citing Mizuta's work as weaker than Shimomura's.

Disc One
No.	Title	Length
1.	"Forbidden Power (Theme for Aya)"	2:05
2.	"Mist"	3:52
3.	"Aya Again"	2:29
4.	"Don't Move!"	0:40
5.	"Nightmare in the Battlefield"	1:19
6.	"Deadly Calm"	1:03
7.	"The First Encounter"	1:43
8.	"Tower Rendezvous"	1:51
9.	"Metamorphosis"	2:19
10.	"Watch Out!"	3:47
11.	"Ambush!"	2:07
12.	"What the Hell Happened?"	3:03
13.	"Do Something!"	1:27
14.	"Weird Man"	2:31
15.	"Return to the Base"	1:42
16.	"Ghost Town"	3:08
17.	"Hunt in Dryfield"	2:15
18.	"Don't Shoot"	0:34
19.	"Douglas Blues"	3:19
20.	"Water Tower"	1:56
21.	"Hiding Place"	4:54
22.	"Dryfield"	1:13
23.	"The Bottom of the Well"	2:17
24.	"Stealth Assault"	2:18
25.	"Heaven-Sent Killer"	2:22
26.	"The Depth of Aya's Memory"	0:54
27.	"From Dusk Till Dawn"	1:49
28.	"Vagrants"	1:56
29.	"Dark Field"	4:46
30.	"Gigantic Burner"	2:13
31.	"Douglas' Grief"	4:06

Disc Two
No.	Title	Length
1.	"Voice of Mitochondria"	2:30
2.	"Pick Up the Gauntlet"	2:53
3.	"Abandoned Mine"	3:56
4.	"Into the Shelter"	1:54
5.	"Wipe Out the Creatures"	2:33
6.	"Hold Your Breath"	1:48
7.	"Crawling Waste Emperor"	3:33
8.	"Chase"	1:29
9.	"Sigh of Relief"	0:51
10.	"Passing Through the Sewer, You'll Find..."	1:48
11.	"Battle on the Waterside"	1:13
12.	"Inner Part of the Shelter"	2:07
13.	"Innermost Part of the Shelter"	2:03
14.	"Negative Heritage"	1:10
15.	"Man Made Nature"	0:57
16.	"Ark"	1:42
17.	"Fool's Paradise"	1:31
18.	"Mitochondria Reactor"	1:10
19.	"Mental Deranger"	0:51
20.	"Stalker"	1:23
21.	"Cruelty of Eve's Fate"	1:16
22.	"Killing Field"	1:06
23.	"Golem Soldiers"	2:57
24.	"Prestige of a Nation"	1:37
25.	"Intrusion"	5:10
26.	"Brace Yourself"	2:38
27.	"Brahman"	3:20
28.	"Distorted Evolution"	3:12
29.	"Logic of the Superpower"	1:15
30.	"Aya's Diary"	1:37
31.	"Epilogue"	1:03
32.	"Gentle Rays"	3:51
33.	"Weird Man (Deleted Core Mix)"	5:10
34.	"Hiding Place (Comfortable Mix)"	5:10
35.	"OMAKE"	0:04

=== Parasite Eve I & II Original Soundtrack Box ===
Parasite Eve I & II Original Soundtrack Box is a combined album featuring the re-releases of the first two Parasite Eve soundtracks. It was released on January 26, 2011. Reviews of the boxset were mixed: while some considered both soundtracks to be good and contrast each other, others considered Parasite Eve II to be weaker and a detriment to the experience.

== The 3rd Birthday ==
=== The 3rd Birthday Original Soundtrack ===
The 3rd Birthday Original Soundtrack

Soundtrack album by Mitsuto Suzuki, Tsuyoshi Sekito, Yoko Shimomura
- Released: December 22, 2010
- Recorded: STRIP Garden
- Length: 2:29:01
- Label: Square Enix
- Producer: Square Enix

The music for The 3rd Birthday was composed by Mitsuto Suzuki and Tsuyoshi Sekito, with additional work by Yoko Shimomura. Shimomura was involved from an early stage, when The 3rd Birthday was still a mobile game. When she was originally asked to compose for the title, she was involved with a number of other projects which made handling the entire score difficult. When asked whether she wanted to work with anyone on the composition, she suggested Suzuki and Sekito. The general instruction was to follow the pattern used by the music for Parasite Eve, with Suzuki and Sekito handling the majority of tracks, going so far as referring to the songs from the original Parasite Eve when handling remixes of old themes. In keeping with the game's other development goals, Shimomura wanted to alter some of the established music, although she asked the team to include familiar themes from earlier games for fans. When she started out, she knew nothing about the game's story, but became familiar with it later in development and also found the project less challenging than she initially anticipated. Suzuki was responsible for a large amount of track mixing. Sekito was mostly involved with choosing and helping with instrumentation, in particular whether to include symphonic music. The composers had a relatively high degree of freedom, but they also had problems when composing some tracks that did not fit into selected scenes.

Re-orchestrations of two pieces of classical music, "Sleepers Wake" by Johann Sebastian Bach and popular Christmas song "Joy to the World", were used by Suzuki and Shimomura respectively to represent key moments and motifs within the game. The order of songs in the game was created to reflect the situation in a level. These variations were emphasized during mixing, while they also needed to adjust the mixing and track length based on the game as a whole. For the game's theme song, Square Enix collaborated with Japanese rock band Superfly. The resultant theme song "Eyes on Me", described as a "standard love song", was specially composed by the band for the game. It was the band's first video game theme song.

The 3rd Birthday Original Soundtrack was released on December 22, 2010 through Square Enix's music label, under the catalog number SQEX-10217~19. "Eyes on Me" was released as a separate single alongside another of Superfly's songs. Upon release, it peaked at #5 in the Oricon music charts, and remained in the charts for eleven weeks. The album received positive reviews from music journalists, with critics generally calling it a high quality album with strong music overall. Reviews of "Eyes on Me" were negative, with reviewers faulting both the quality of the song and its appropriateness within the game's context.

Disc One
No.	Title	Length
1.	"From the End – The 3rd Birthday"	3:39
2.	"The Babel: Genesis"	2:52
3.	"Investigation of the Past"	5:04
4.	"Beginning of Breeding"	3:51
5.	"Joy to the World – For The 3rd Birthday"	2:50
6.	"Flashback"	0:31
7.	"Dive into Myself"	3:15
8.	"Wait for the Combustion"	2:02
9.	"Brave New World"	1:31
10.	"Contact, Freeze, Explode"	2:28
11.	"Unknown Unknown"	2:12
12.	"Equinox of Insanity"	2:20
13.	"Insanity of the Enraged"	3:11
14.	"Reaper"	2:33
15.	"Moment of Humanity"	2:18
16.	"Bloody Black"	3:29
17.	"Frozen Time"	1:22
18.	"The Boss"	2:42
19.	"Arriving Home"	2:07
20.	"Angel's Time"	1:57
21.	"Dive into Myself – Deep Inside"	2:24
22.	"DayDreamer"	2:34
23.	"Light of Time"	2:01

Disc Two
No.	Title	Length
1.	"Memory II – For The 3rd Birthday"	2:02
2.	"Ruin"	2:12
3.	"Arise Within You – For The 3rd Birthday"	3:20
4.	"Moment of Silence"	2:04
5.	"Time of Insanity"	2:16
6.	"Queen"	3:45
7.	"Cloud of Aureolin"	4:16
8.	"Girl in the Dream"	1:19
9.	"Unforgettable Man"	2:14
10.	"Out of Phase – For The 3rd Birthday"	2:06
11.	"Dive into the Cause"	2:33
12.	"Pain of Assault"	2:42
13.	"Human Seeker"	2:02
14.	"Human Seeker – Battle Side"	2:34
15.	"Uncontrol"	2:46
16.	"Monodrama"	2:55
17.	"Crossing Time, Crossing Mind"	2:51
18.	"Dr. Maeda (Or How I Learned to Start Loving DNA)"	2:43
19.	"End of the Investigation"	0:28
20.	"Worm"	2:23
21.	"Fright Night"	2:40
22.	"Desperation"	2:29
23.	"Ray of Hope"	2:13
24.	"Triumph of Wing"	2:20
25.	"Cityscapes"	2:41
26.	"Crimson Eyes"	2:46
27.	"Unforgettable Man – Return to Me"	1:39

Disc Three
No.	Title	Length
1.	"King of Closing Time"	2:39
2.	"A Piece of Remain – For The 3rd Birthday"	2:29
3.	"The Way Things Are"	2:09
4.	"Into the Babel"	6:31
5.	"Escape from UB – For The 3rd Birthday"	2:42
6.	"Terminus Zero"	4:27
7.	"Immortality of Time"	3:46
8.	"Blue of the End"	3:02
9.	"Dive into Myself – Changing To..."	3:10
10.	"Wachet Auf, Ruft Uns Der Zeitpunkt Null" (Based on Cantata BWV 140 by J. S. Bach)	1:11
11.	"The End – Back to the Beginning"	9:43
12.	"Come Again to Christmas"	2:39
13.	"Screaming"	0:12
14.	"Primal Eyes – For The 3rd Birthday"	2:24
15.	"Brea the Brave"	3:02
16.	"Theme of Aya – The 3rd Birthday Early Essence Arrange"	1:14
