= Parasite Eve =

Parasite Eve may refer to:

- Parasite Eve (novel), a 1995 Japanese science fiction horror novel by Hideaki Sena
- Parasite Eve (film), a 1997 Japanese science fiction film based on the novel
- Parasite Eve (video game), a 1998 role-playing video game which serves as a sequel to the novel
- "Parasite Eve" (song), a 2020 single by British rock band Bring Me the Horizon from their project Post Human
