= Isamu Kamikokuryo =

Japanese video game artist (born 1976)

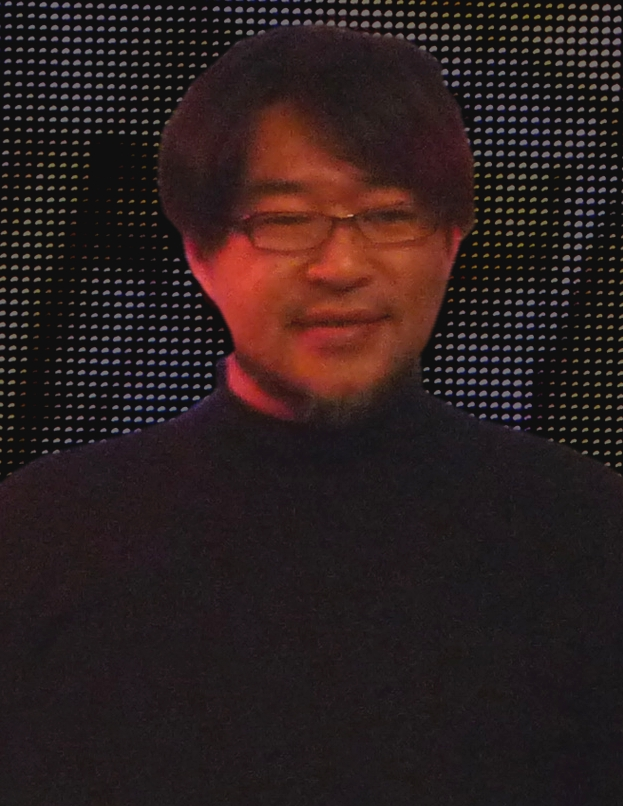
- Kamikokuryo in 2010
- Born: July 31, 1970 (age 56); Kagoshima Prefecture, Japan
- Occupation: Video game artist
- Years active: 1999–present

Isamu Kamikokuryo (上国料 勇, Kamikokuryō Isamu; born July 31, 1970) is a Japanese video game artist who worked at Square Enix until his resignation on March 31, 2017. He is known for his work on the company's role-playing video game series Final Fantasy, for which he designed locations and characters. Among others, he was involved in the Ivalice Alliance and Fabula Nova Crystallis franchises.

Kamikokuryo had initially planned to become an oil painter and illustrator but was inspired to join the video game industry by the release of Final Fantasy VII. His influences as an artist include realist painter Andrew Wyeth and photojournalist Steve McCurry. Kamikokuryo draws inspiration from his photography hobby and world travels.

== Biography and career ==
Kamikokuryo was born on July 31, 1970. He originally aspired to become an oil painter and illustrator, but his hobby of playing video games had him interested in their emerging industry early on. With the increasing use of 3D computer graphics and the release of Final Fantasy VII for the PlayStation console, Kamikokuryo began to study design. After about three years, he applied at Square with a resume containing a photographed oil painting of his and was hired by the company in 1999.

Kamikokuryo started working at the company back in 1999, beginning with concept art for Final Fantasy X. Kamikokuryo's first assignment was directing the background art for Final Fantasy X. In July 2001, he joined the Final Fantasy XII project team and took a high fantasy approach to creating the game's fictional world. Kamikokuryo designed large cities with varied architectural styles as he wanted to convey the feeling of walking through a real-life metropolis. His early illustrations for the game were based heavily on the concept of floating continents but could not be fully realized during development. However, they eventually wound up as the principal setting for the Nintendo DS sequel Final Fantasy XII: Revenant Wings whose art was also supervised by Kamikokuryo.

For Final Fantasy XIII, he again assumed the role of art director. Kamikokuryo and his team spent almost one year on pre-production for the game. While he was still working on Final Fantasy XIII, he was asked to create illustrations for The 3rd Birthday. He accepted the offer because Aya Brea was one of his favorite characters and he wished to participate in the revival of the Parasite Eve series. Kamikokuryo eventually became the game's art director and went through a long period of trial and error while trying to conceive a unique graphical style. The visuals started to come together once he had drawn an illustration of a monster hive centered around the concepts of "fear" and "sensuality". While Kamikokuryo did not personally design the characters' costumes, he gave specific instructions to the artist in charge of them.

Afterwards, Kamikokuryo worked as art director on Final Fantasy XIII-2. As he felt that the tone of the story was much darker than that of its predecessor, he decided on surrealism as the main theme for the visuals. The works of Salvador Dalí and Giorgio de Chirico were used as references and helped Kamikokuryo strike a balance between photorealism and fantasy-like surrealism. Unlike Final Fantasy XIII, the game had a much tighter schedule allowing for little pre-production. Kamikokuryo hence used photographs instead of self-drawn pictures to explain his setting ideas to the other staff members. For example, a photograph of ruined buildings in the Cuban capital Havana inspired the look of Valhalla, the afterlife of Final Fantasy XIII-2. Kamikokuryo gave his artists more freedom to include their own ideas in the game's locations, intending to rectify the shortcomings of the more artificial seeming settings in Final Fantasy XIII. In addition to adjusting models, camera angles and lighting effects, he also drew the final version of the character Lightning based on a silhouette sketch by Tetsuya Nomura. Kamikokuryo's first character design, he received suggestions from Nomura and finished Lightning's costume in one to two months.

For Lightning Returns: Final Fantasy XIII, the conclusion of the trilogy started with Final Fantasy XIII, Kamikokuryo again was the art director. For the game's art style, he suggested a blend between mechanical designs, fantasy elements and gothic art. As such, he and his team used 19th century gadgets and London at the time of the Industrial Revolution as visual references. Kamikokuryo designed two of Lightning's costumes, among them the "Nocturne" garb.

Kamikokuryo resigned from Square Enix on March 31, 2017. His last game at the company was Final Fantasy XV, on which he served as art director. He thanked Square Enix for giving him so many opportunities to both work with great people, as well as deploy his skills. Kamikokuryo now aims to start writing again in addition to doing freelance art and diction work. In 2019 Kamikokuryo joined the development team making the PlayStation 4 game Gungrave G.O.R.E.

== Style and personal life ==
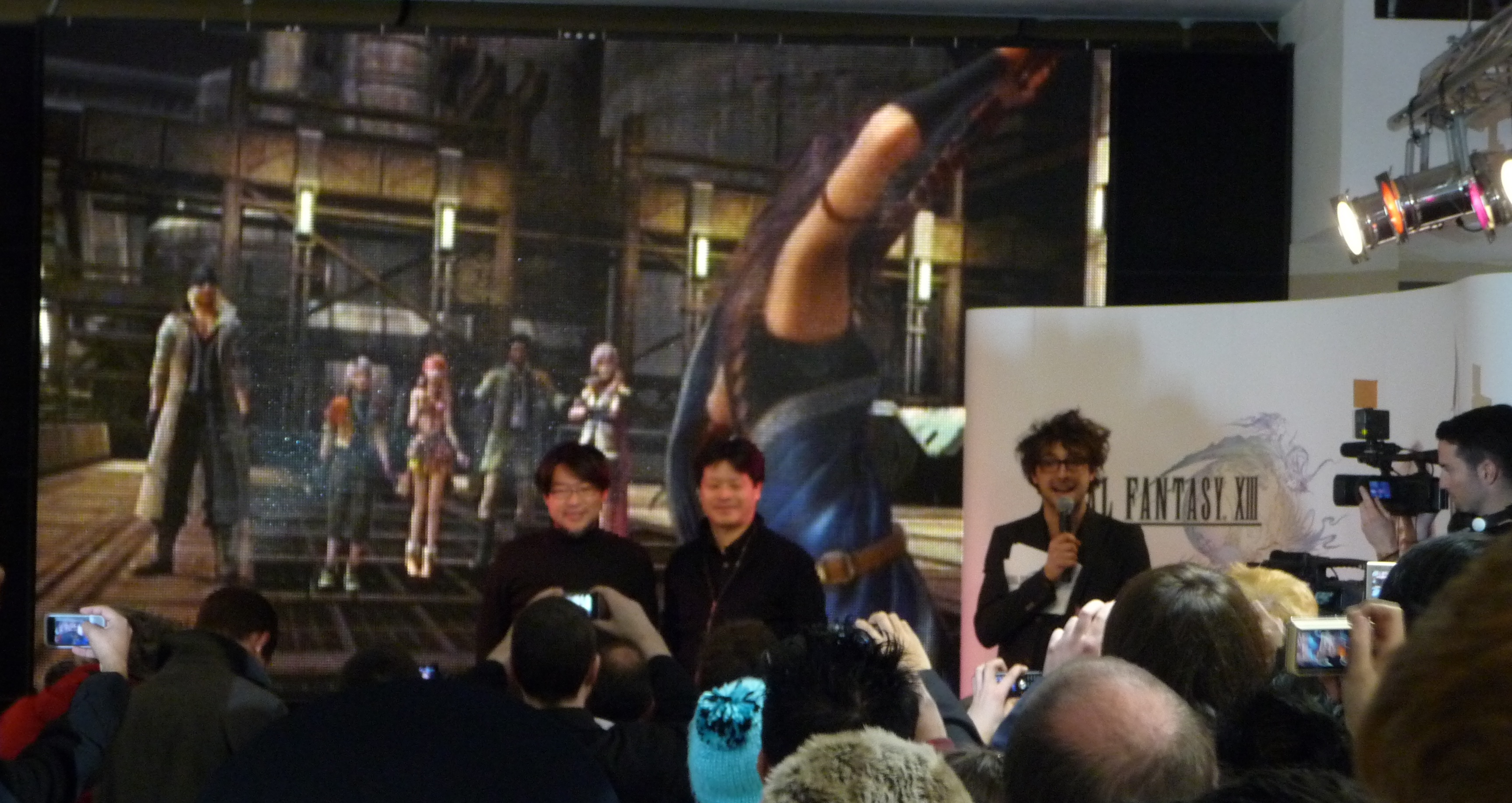
Isamu Kamikokuryo (left) and Yoshinori Kitase (middle) at a Final Fantasy XIII launch event in London hosted by Alex Zane (right)

Before he joined the game industry, Kamikokuryo had created figurative art of people and landscapes. His primary influences are realist painter Andrew Wyeth, industrial designer Luigi Colani, comics artists Alex Ross and Frank Frazetta as well as photojournalist Steve McCurry. Kamikokuryo also gives Hajime Sorayama, Katsuya Terada, Range Murata, Akira Yasuda, Ryuichiro Kutsuzawa and Alphonse Mucha as his favorite artists. Some of the tools and programs used by Kamikokuryo are a Vaio computer, an Intuos graphics tablet and the applications Adobe Photoshop and MetaCreations Painter. He explained how his style differs depending on the teams he works with: Yoshinori Kitase's staff would normally ask for "catchy and original" designs while Yasumi Matsuno's would request something "highly artistic in nature" and "faithful to [the] sound foundation" of the team.

Kamikokuryo lives in Tokyo. He is an avid hobby photographer and world traveler, taking pictures of scenery and buildings for future reference. For example, he had visited New York City, the Grand Canyon and ancient ruins in Italy before he started working on Final Fantasy XIII. He likes playing video games that demand deliberate judgments, such as those in the simulation and real-time strategy genre. Kamikokuryo's preferred titles include Grand Theft Auto, The Elder Scrolls IV: Oblivion, Red Dead Redemption, Dragon Warrior III and Final Fantasy VII. His favorite musicians are Japanese singers Ringo Sheena and Lisa.

== Works ==
Year	Game	Role(s)	Ref.
2001	Final Fantasy X	Gadget art designer, background art director	
2006	Final Fantasy XII	Art director	
2007	Final Fantasy XII: Revenant Wings	Art supervisor	
2009	Final Fantasy XIII	Art director	
2010	The 3rd Birthday	Art director	
2011	Final Fantasy XIII-2	Art director, character designer	
2013	Lightning Returns: Final Fantasy XIII	Art director	
2016	Final Fantasy XV	Art director	
2017	Final Fantasy XII: The Zodiac Age	Promotional illustrator	
2020	Paper Mario: The Origami King	Art director	
2022	The Diofield Chronicle	Character designer, concept art	
2022	Harvestella	Concept art	
2024	Paper Mario: The Thousand-Year Door	Art director (HD remake)	
