= List of fictional police detectives =

Below is an alphabetical list of fictional police detectives and their creators (with, in many cases, the actor/actress most known for playing the character in a dramatisation).

== A ==
- Detective Butch Ada – Saving Grace (played by Bailey Chase)
- Detective Tohru Adachi – Persona 4 (voiced by Johnny Yong Bosch)
- Commissaire Jean-Baptiste Adamsberg – Fred Vargas
- Detective Goro Akechi – Persona 5 (voiced by Robbie Daymond)
- DCI Roderick Alleyn (later DCS) – Ngaio Marsh (played by Simon Williams and Patrick Malahide in The Inspector Alleyn Mysteries)
- Chief Inspector W. R. Allison – The Brighton Strangler (played by Miles Mander)
- Detective John Anthony – Kingston's Finest (played by himself)
- Inspector Arnz – House of Frankenstein (played by Lionel Atwill)
- Detective Nick Armstrong— The Rookie (played by Harold Perrineau)

== B ==
- Detective Sergeant (later Detective Inspector) John Bacchus – Alan Hunter (played by Lee Ingleby in Inspector George Gently )
- Detective (later Detective Sergeant, then Lieutenant, then Captain, then retired) Angel Batista — Dexter (played by David Zayas in the tv show and James Martinez in Dexter: Original Sin)
- Kriminalhauptkommissar Balko – Balko (German, played by Jochen Horst and Bruno Eyron)
- Detective Chief Inspector Alan Banks – Peter Robinson (played by Stephen Tompkinson in DCI Banks)
- Detective Carolyn Barek – Law & Order: Criminal Intent (played by Annabella Sciorra)
- Detective Anthony Vincenzo "Tony" Baretta – (played by Robert Blake) created by Stephen J Connell
- Detective Inspector Charlie Barlow – Troy Kennedy Martin and Allan Prior (played by Stratford Johns in Z-Cars and Softly, Softly)
- Detective Chief Inspector John Barnaby – Caroline Graham (played by Neil Dudgeon in Midsomer Murders)
- Detective Chief Inspector Thomas "Tom" Barnaby – Caroline Graham ( played by John Nettles in Midsomer Murders)
- Detective Kate Beckett – Castle, Andrew W. Marlowe (played by Stana Katic)
- Detective Cal Beecher – Person of Interest (played by Sterling K. Brown)
- Detective Mick Belker – Hill Street Blues (played by Bruce Weitz)
- Detective Olivia Benson (later, Sergeant, then Lieutenant, then Captain) - played by Mariska Hargitay on Law & Order: SVU
- Detective Sergeant Jim Bergerac – Robert Banks Stewart (played by John Nettles in Bergerac)
- Detective Chief Inspector David Bilborough – Jimmy McGovern (played by Christopher Eccleston in Cracker)
- Inspector Bird – (played by Harry Stubbs in The Invisible Man)
- Detective G. Lynn Bishop – Law & Order: Criminal Intent (played by Samantha Buck)
- Detective Captain John Book – Pamela Wallace, Earl W. Wallace and William Kelley (played by Harrison Ford in Witness)
- Detective Inspector Mike Bolt – Simon Kernick
- Detective Inspector Napoleon Bonaparte – Arthur Upfield (played by James Laurenson in Boney)
- Detective Stella Bonasera – CSI: NY (played by Melina Kanakaredes)
- DS Camille Bordey – Death in Paradise
- Detective Harry Bosch – Michael Connelly (played by Titus Welliver)
- Detective Constable Gary Boyle – Ben Elton (played by Mark Addy in The Thin Blue Line)
- Detective Braenders – The Light in the Dark (played by Charles Mussett)
- Detective Aya Brea – Parasite Eve
- Inspector William Brent – Alfred Hitchcock Presents episode Banquo's Chair (played by John Williams)
- Detective Lennie Briscoe – Law & Order (played by Jerry Orbach)
- Detective Inspector Nash Bridges – Carlton Cuse (played by Don Johnson in Nash Bridges)
- Detective Constable David Briggs – Jasper Carrott (played by Robert Powell in The Detectives)
- Inspector Bristol – The Adventures of Sherlock Holmes (played by E.E. Clive)
- Detective Sergeant Ronnie Brooks – Dick Wolf (played by Bradley Walsh in Law & Order: UK)
- Inspector Bucket – Charles Dickens (played by Stephen Rea in Dickensian) (played by Alun Armstrong in Bleak House)
- Detective Lieutenant Frank Bullitt – Robert L. Fish (played by Steve McQueen in Bullitt)
- Detective Sergeant George Bulman - Created by Murray Smith and played by Don Henderson in the TV series Strangers
- Inspector Edward C. Burke – (played by Lon Chaney in London After Midnight)
- Special Agent Peter Burke – (played by Tim DeKay in White Collar)
- Detective Harvey Bullock – Batman comics, Archie Goodwin, Howard Chaykin, Doug Moench and Don Newton (played by Robert Costanzo in Batman: The Animated Series) (played by Donal Logue in Gotham)
- Detective Aiden Burn – CSI: NY (played by Vanessa Ferlito)
- Detective Sergeant Marcus Burnett – George Gallo (played by Martin Lawrence in Bad Boys, Bad Boys II and Bad Boys for Life)
- Detective Inspector (later Detective Chief Inspector) Frank Burnside – Geoff McQueen (played by Christopher Ellison in The Bill)

== C ==
- Max Carrados – a blind detective in a series of mystery stories by Ernest Bramah
- Detective Inspector Jack Caffery – Mo Hayder
- Detective Christine Cagney – Barbara Avedon and Barbara Corday (played by Loretta Swit 1981, Meg Foster 1982 and Sharon Gless 1983 to 1988 in Cagney and Lacey)
- Lieutenant Horatio Caine – (played by David Caruso in CSI: Miami )
- Inspector Harry Callahan – Harry Julian Fink and Rita M. Fink (played by Clint Eastwood in the Dirty Harry film series)
- Chief Inspector Chen Cao – Qiu Xiaolong
- Detective 2nd Grade Stephen Louis ("Steve") Carella – Ed McBain
- Detective Sergeant Ray Carling – Life on Mars/Ashes to Ashes (played by Dean Andrews)
- Detective Chief Inspector (Retired) Ted Case – Nigel McCrery and Roy Mitchell (played by Larry Lamb in New Tricks )
- Lieutenant Gabriel Cash – Randy Feldman and Jeffrey Boam (played by Kurt Russell in Tango & Cash )
- Detective Sergeant George Carter – Ian Kennedy Martin (played by Dennis Waterman 1975 to 1978 and Ben Drew 2012 in The Sweeney)
- Detective Jocelyn "Joss" Carter – Person of Interest (played by Taraji P. Henson)
- Detective Constable (later Detective Sergeant) Jim Carver – Geoff McQueen (played by Mark Wingett in The Bill )
- Detective Sergeant Sam Casey – Dick Wolf (played by Paul Nicholls in Law & Order: UK )
- Commissaire Henri Castang – Nicholas Freeling
- Detective Phil Cerreta – Law & Order (played by Paul Sorvino)
- Inspector Raoul de Chagny – Phantom of the Opera (played by Edgar Barrier)
- Detective Inspector Hal Challis – Garry Disher
- Charlie Chan – Earl Derr Biggers
- Detective Elizabeth Childs – Orphan Black (played by Tatiana Maslany)
- Detective John Clark, Jr. – NYPD Blue (played by Mark-Paul Gosselaar)
- Detective John Clark, Sr. – NYPD Blue (played by Joe Spano)
- Police Sergeant Barry Clive – Thirteen Women (played by Ricardo Cortez)
- Inspector Jacques Clouseau – Blake Edwards' The Pink Panther (played by Peter Sellers 1963 and 1964, Alan Arkin 1968, Peter Sellers 1975 to 1982, Steve Martin 2006 and 2009 )
- Detective Rust Cohle – True Detective (played by Matthew McConaughey)
- Lieutenant Frank Columbo – William Link (played by Peter Falk in Columbo)
- Lieutenant Marion "Cobra" Cobretti – Paula Gosling (played by Sylvester Stallone in Cobra )
- Detective Chief Inspector Roisin Connor – Lynda la Plante (played by Victoria Smurfit in Trial & Retribution )
- Sergeant Cork (played by John Barrie)
- Detective Inspector Henry Crabbe – Pie in the Sky (played by Richard Griffiths)
- DI Vincent Crane – Shaun Hutson
- DI Andy Crawford in Dixon – Dock Green
- Sergeant Cribb – Peter Lovesey
- Detective Sergeant James "Sonny" Crockett – Anthony Yerkovich (played by Don Johnson 1984 to 1990 and Colin Farrell 2006 in Miami Vice)
- Detective Alex Cross – James Patterson
- Sergeant Cuff – Wilkie Collins's The Moonstone
- Commissioner Cummings – Alfred Hitchcock Presents episode Safety for the Witness (played by James Westerfield)
- Detective Jackie Curatola – Blue Bloods played by Jennifer Esposito
- Detective Nick Curran – Joe Eszterhas (played by Michael Douglas in Basic Instinct )
- Detective Rey Curtis – Law & Order (played by Benjamin Bratt)
- Special Agent Clara Seger ((Criminal Minds - Beyond Borders) - (Alana de la Garza))
- Detective Lieutenant Frank Cioffi – Curtains (musical) (played by David Hyde Pierce)

== D ==
- Commander Adam Dalgliesh – P. D. James (played by Roy Marsden)
- Lieutenant Eve Dallas – J. D. Robb
- Detective Jack Cloth – A Touch of Cloth (BBC TV series)
- Detective Jake Peralta – “Brooklyn Nine-Nine” (played by Andy Samberg)
- Detective Jo Danville – CSI: NY (played by Sela Ward)
- Assistant Commissioner Shabor Dasgupta – Shirshendu Mukhopadhyay
- Detective Sergeant Deke DaSilva – David Shaber and Paul Sylbert (played by Sylvester Stallone in Nighthawks)
- Detective Constable "Dangerous" Davies – Leslie Thomas (played by Peter Davison in The Last Detective)
- Senior Detective Antonio Dawson - Chicago P.D. (Played by Jon Seda)
- Lieutenant Rick Deckard – Philip K. Dick (played by Harrison Ford in Blade Runner and Blade Runner 2049)
- DI De Cock – A. C. Baantjer
- Detective Inspector Vivenne Deering – Paul Abbott (played by Joanna Scanlan in No Offence)
- Detective Sergeant Dan "Bean" Delgardo – Robert Kaufman and Floyd Mutrux (played by Alan Arkin in "Freebie and the Bean")
- Detective Lieutenant James Dempsey – Ranald Graham (played by Michael Brandon in Dempsey and Makepeace)
- Detective Sergeant Matt Devlin – Dick Wolf (played by Jamie Bamber in Law & Order: UK)
- Detective Superintendent Peter Diamond – Peter Lovesey
- Detective Ryotaro Dojima – Persona 4 (voiced by JB Blanc)
- Detective Inspector Alex Drake – Matthew Graham and Ashley Pharoah (played by Keeley HawesAshes to Ashes)
- Lt. Frank Drebin – Police Squad! (played by Leslie Nielsen)
- DCP Durai Singam – Singam (played by Suriya)
- Inspector Doyle – The Great Ziegfeld (played by Raymond Brown)
- Chief Inspector Charles Dreyfus – Blake Edwards' The Pink Panther (played by Herbert Lom 1964 to 1993, Kevin Kline 2006, John Cleese 2009)
- Lieutenant Double-Yefreitor Harrier "Harry" DuBois – Disco Elysium
- Detective Lieutenant Dundy – (played by Robert Elliott and Barton MacLane)
- Detective Rosa Diaz – ”Brooklyn Nine-Nine” (portrayed by Stephanie Beatriz)
- Detective Sergeant James Doakes — Dexter (Played by Erik King in the tv show)

== E ==
- Detective Alexandra Eames (later Lieutenant) – Law & Order: Criminal Intent (played by Kathryn Erbe)
- Detective Daniel Espinoza – Lucifer (played by Kevin Alejandro)
- Detective Javier Esposito – Andrew W. Marlowe (played by Jon Huertas in Castle)

== F ==
- Inspector Jefe Javier Falcón – Robert Wilson
- Detective Nola Falacci – Law & Order: Criminal Intent (played by Alicia Witt)
- Inspector John "Scottie" Ferguson – (played by James Stewart in Vertigo)
- Inspector Fix – Around the World in Eighty Days (played by Robert Newton and Ewen Bremner)
- Detective Don Flack – CSI: NY (played by Eddie Cahill)
- Lieutenant Flannery – Alfred Hitchcock Presents episode Safety for the Witness (played by Robert Bray)
- Police Inspector Jim Flower – (played by Jay C. Flippen in A Woman's Secret)
- Detective Joe Fontana - Law & Order (played by Dennis Farina)
- Detective Inspector Maggie Forbes – Terence Feely (played by Jill Gascoine in The Gentle Touch)
- Detective Chief Superintendent Christopher Foyle – (played by Michael Kitchen in Foyle's War)
- DI Stuart Fraser – Taggart
- Inspector Joseph French – Freeman Wills Crofts
- Detective Sergeant Joe Friday – Jack Webb (played by Jack Webb 1951 to 1970 Dan Aykroyd 1987 in Dragnet)
- Detective Inspector Jack Frost – R. D. Wingfield (played by David Jason in A Touch of Frost)
- Detective Sergeant Matthew Fox – David Shaber and Paul Sylbert (played by Billy Dee Williams in Nighthawks )
- Detective Lionel Fusco – Person of Interest (played by Kevin Chapman)

== G ==
- Inspector Gadget – Inspector Gadget
- Chief Inspector Armand Gamache – Louise Penny
- Detective Harry Garibaldi – Hill Street Blues (played by Ken Olin)
- Detective Chief Inspector George Gently – Alan Hunter (played by Martin Shaw in Inspector George Gently)
- Inspector Ganesh V. Ghote – H. R. F. Keating (played by Naseeruddin Shah in The Perfect Murder)
- DSI Stella Gibson – The Fall (played by Gillian Anderson)
- Commander George Gideon – John Creasey (played by John Gregson in Gideon's Way)
- Inspector Good – Hook (played by Phil Collins)
- Detective James Gordon – Gotham (played by Benjamin McKenzie)
- Detective Robert Goren – Law & Order: Criminal Intent (Played by Vincent D'Onofrio)
- Detective Sergeant Rinus de Gier – Janwillem van de Wetering
- Inspector Gina Gold – The Bill (played by Roberta Taylor)
- Harry Goodman – Pokémon Detective Pikachu(portrayed by Ryan Reynolds)
- Detective Inspector Humphrey Goodman – Robert Thorogood (played by Kris Marshall in Death in Paradise )
- Inspector Goole – J. B. Priestley (An Inspector Calls; first played onstage by Ralph Richardson)
- Detective Robert Goren – Law & Order: Criminal Intent (played by Vincent D'Onofrio)
- Detective Superintendent Roy Grace – Peter James
- Detective Jack Graham – Shadow of a Doubt (played by Macdonald Carey)
- Detective Kima Greggs – The Wire (played by Sonja Sohn)
- Inspector Gregson – Arthur Conan Doyle (played by Matthew Boulton)
- Detective Ed Green – Law & Order (played by Jesse L. Martin)
- Detective Chief Inspector (Retired) Dan Griffin – Nigel McCrery and Roy Mitchell (played by Nicholas Lyndhurst in New Tricks )
- Adjutant Henk Grijpstra – Janwillem van de Wetering
- Detective Inspector Derek Grim – Ben Elton (played by David Haig in The Thin Blue Line)
- Joseph Grimstone - Aurora Floyd by Mary Elizabeth Braddon
- Marshal Guarnaccia – Magdalen Nabb
- Detective Dick Gumshoe – Ace Attorney
- DI Gunnarstranda – Kjell Ola Dahl
- Officer Marge Gunderson – Fargo (played by Frances McDormand)

== H ==
- Detective Chief Superintendent (Retired) Jack Halford – Nigel McCrery and Roy Mitchell (played by James Bolam in New Tricks )
- Detective Grace Hanadarko – Saving Grace (played by Holly Hunter)
- Inspector Hanaud – A. E. W. Mason
- Lieutenant Vincent Hanna – Michael Mann (played by Al Pacino in Heat )
- Detective Harding – The Return of Dr. Fu Manchu (played by Shayle Gardner)
- Detective Inspector Alec Hardy – Broadchurch (played by David Tennant)
- Detective Martin Hart – True Detective (played by Woody Harrelson)
- Detective Sergeant James Hathaway – (played by Laurence Fox in Lewis)
- Detective Sergeant Barbara Havers – Elizabeth George (played by Sharon Small in The Inspector Lynley Mysteries)
- Detective Sergeant John Ho – Ian Kennedy Martin (played by David Yip in The Chinese Detective
- Harry Hole – Jo Nesbø
- Police Inspector Holtz – House of Dracula (played by Lionel Atwill)
- Detective Mike Hoolihan – Martin Amis (played by Patricia Clarkson in Out of Blue )
- Inspector Hopkins – Arthur Conan Doyle (played by Carl Harbord)
- Commissioner Sir Basil Humphrey – Dracula's Daughter (played by Gilbert Emery)
- Detective Chief Inspector Gene Hunt – Matthew Graham, Tony Jordan and Ashley Pharoah (played by Philip Glenister in Life on Mars and Ashes to Ashes)
- Detective Kenneth "Hutch" Hutchinson – William Blinn and Ryan Blinn (played by David Soul 1975 to 1979, Owen Wilson 2004 in Starsky & Hutch)
- Inspector Huxley – The Suspect (played by Stanley Ridges)
- Detective chief Jim Hopper – “Stranger Things” (played by David Harbour)
- Detective Nyla Harper — The Rookie (played by Mekia Cox)

== I ==
- CBI Officer Sethurama Iyer – (played by Mammooty in the Indian CBI film series)
- SAC Isobel Castille ((FBI) - (Alana de la Garza))

== J ==
- Superintendent Jack Meadows (formerly Detective Chief Inspector) – The Bill (played by Simon Rouse)
- Inspector Jacobson – Iain McDowall
- Inspector Jackson – (played by Thomas E. Jackson in The Woman in the Window)
- Detective Chief Inspector James Japp (later Assistant Commissioner) – Agatha Christie (played by Melville Cooper 1931, John Turnbull 1934, Maurice Denham 1965, David Suchet 1985, Philip Jackson in the British TV series Agatha Christie's Poirot 1989 to 2013 and Kevin McNally 2018)
- Inspector Javert – Victor Hugo (played by Geoffrey Rush 1998, Russell Crowe 2012, David Oyelowo 2018 in Les Misérables
- Detective Baldwin Jones – NYPD Blue (played by Henry Simmons)
- Detective Chief Inspector Richard Jury (later Superintendent) – Martha Grimes
- Detective Jacob Peralta – Andy Samberg
- Detective Jo Martinez ((Forever) - (Alana de la Garza))

== K ==
- Detective Kane – Person of Interest (played by Anthony Mangano)
- Detective Eddie Kane – The Stolen Jools (played by Eddie Kane)
- Detective J.Z. Kane – Walter Hill (played by Kim Basinger in Dog and Cat )
- Detective Assistant Inspector Steven Keller – Carolyn Weston (played by Michael Douglas in The Streets of San Francisco )
- Detective John Kelly – NYPD Blue (played by David Caruso)
- Detective Kelly – Down to Earth (played by James Burke)
- Inspector Kemp – Young Frankenstein (played by Kenneth Mars)
- Sergeant John Kennedy – The Tall Target (played by Dick Powell)
- Detective Jill Kirkendall – NYPD Blue (played by Andrea Thompson)
- Detective Bert Kling – Ed McBain
- Detective Lieutenant Theo Kojak – Abby Mann (played by Telly Savalas in Kojak)
- Detective Kreps – Steve Martin & John Hoffman (played by Michael Rapaport in Only Murders in the Building)
- Inspector Krogh – Son of Frankenstein (played by Lionel Atwill)

== L ==
- Detective Mary Beth Lacey – Barbara Avedon and Barbara Corday (played by Tyne Daly in Cagney and Lacey)
- Detective Angela Lopez — The Rookie (played by Alyssa Diaz)
- Detective Meyer Landsman – Michael Chabon's The Yiddish Policeman's Union
- Detective Inspector (Retired) Brian Lane – Nigel McCrery and Roy Mitchell (played by Alun Armstrong in New Tricks )
- Detective Chief Inspector James Langton – Lynda La Plante (played by Ciarán Hinds in Above Suspicion)
- Drury Lane (character) – a deaf detective created by Ellery Queen
- Detective J.D. LaRue – Hill Street Blues (played by Kiel Martin)
- Detective Carlton Lassiter – Psych (played by Timothy Omundson)
- Commissaire Claude Lebel – Frederick Forsyth (played by Michael Lonsdale in The Day of the Jackal)
- Inspector Ledoux – (played by Arthur Edmund Carewe in The Phantom of the Opera)
- Inspector Charles LeDuque – (played by Lloyd Nolan in the Bonanza episode The Stranger)
- Inspector Jacques Lefevre – (played by Nils Asther in Bluebeard)
- Inspector Lestrade – Arthur Conan Doyle (played by Dennis Hoey 1939 to 1946, Colin Jeavons 1984 to 1994, Danny Webb 2002 and Rupert Graves 2010 to 2017 in adaptations of Sherlock Holmes stories)
- Detective Inspector Mike Lewis – Lynda La Plante (played by Shaun Dingwall in Above Suspicion)
- Detective Sergeant Robert Lewis (later Detective Inspector) – Colin Dexter (played by Kevin Whately in Inspector Morse and Lewis)
- Detective Erin Lindsay - Chicago P.D. (Played by Sophia Bush)
- Detective Constable Alfred "Tosh" Lines – Geoff McQueen (played by Kevin Lloyd in The Bill )
- Detective Superintendent Joona Linna – Lars Kepler (played by Tobias Zilliacus in The Hypnotist)
- Vicequestore Lolita Lobosco – Gabriella Genisi (played by Luisa Ranieri in Lolita Lobosco)
- Detective Superintendent Tom Lockhart (later Detective Chief Superintendent) – (played by Raymond Francis in No Hiding Place)
- Detective Mike Logan – Law & Order and Law & Order: Criminal Intent (played by Chris Noth)
- Detective Sergeant Michael Lowrey – George Gallo (played by Will Smith in Bad Boys, Bad Boys II and Bad Boys for Life )
- Detective Constable Bob Louis – Jasper Carrott (played by Jasper Carrott in The Detectives )
- Detective Inspector Sarah Lund – Søren Sveistrup (played by Sofie Gråbøl in The Killing)
- Detective Chief Inspector John Luther – Neil Cross (played by Idris Elba in Luther )
- Detective Inspector Thomas Lynley – Elizabeth George (played by Nathaniel Parker in The Inspector Lynley Mysteries)
- Detective (later Lieutenant, then Captain) Maria Laguerta — Dexter (played by Lauren Vélez in the tv series, Christina Milian in Dexter: original sin)

== M ==
- Detective Inspector (Retired) Steve McAndrew – Nigel McCrery and Roy Mitchell (played by Denis Lawson in New Tricks )
- Detective Lieutenant John McClane – (played by Bruce Willis in the Die Hard film series)
- Captain Mark McCluskey – (played by Sterling Hayden in The Godfather)
- Chief Inspector Robert Macdonald of Scotland Yard – E.C.R. Lorac
- Detective Connie McDowell – NYPD Blue (played by Charlotte Ross)
- Detective Lieutenant Steve McGarrett – Leonard Freeman (played by Jack Lord in Hawaii Five-O)
- Detective James "Jimmy" McNulty – The Wire (played by Dominic West)
- Inspector Mackenzie – Doctor Who episode Ghost Light (played by Frank Windsor)
- Detective Vic Mackey – Shawn Ryan (played by Michael Chiklis in The Shield)
- Detective Garda Cassie Maddox – Sarah Phelps (played by Sarah Greene in Dublin Murders)
- Sergeant Ivor Maddox – Elizabeth Linington
- Commissaire Jules Maigret – Georges Simenon (played by Charles Laughton 1949, Jean Gabin 1957 to 1963, Basil Sydney 1959, Rupert Davies 1960 to 1963, Gino Cervi 1966, Richard Harris 1985, Michael Gambon 1992 to 1993, Bruno Cremer 1991 to 2005 and Rowan Atkinson 2016 to 2017)
- Detective Sergeant Harriet "Harry" Makepeace – Ranald Graham (played by Glynis Barber in Dempsey and Makepeace)
- Detective Patsy Mayo – Hill Street Blues (played by Mimi Kuzyk)
- Detective Chief Inspector Jack Meadows – The Bill (played by Simon Rouse)
- Lieutenant Luis Mendoza – Elizabeth Linington writing as Dell Shannon
- Detective Danny Messer – CSI: NY (played by Carmine Giovinazzo)
- Detective Meyer Meyer – Ed McBain
- Detective Sergeant Ellie Miller – Chris Chibnall (played by Olivia Colman in Broadchurch)
- Detective Chief Inspector Sasha Miller – Nigel McCrery and Roy Mitchell (played by Tamzin Outhwaite in New Tricks)
- Detective Mills – Se7en (played by Brad Pitt)
- Detective Inspector Tomoe Minai - Higurashi When They Cry (played by Nana Inoue)
- Detective Robert Monday – Premium Rush
- Detective Lindsay Monroe – CSI: NY (played by Anna Belknap)
- Inspector Angus Montague – (played by Randolph Scott in Susannah of the Mounties)
- Commisario Salvo Montalbano – Andrea Camilleri (played by Luca Zingaretti in Inspector Montalbano)
- Detective Inspector Jack Mooney – Robert Thorogood (played by Ardal O'Hanlon in Death in Paradise)
- Detective William "Bunk" Moreland – The Wire (played by Wendell Pierce)
- Detective (later Lieutenant, then private investigator, then Detective again) Debra Morgan - Dexter (played by Jennifer Carpenter in the tv show and Molly Brown in Dexter: Original sin)
- Detective Inspector Helen Morton - (Played by Caroline Catz in DCI Banks)
- Detective Chief Inspector Endeavour Morse – Colin Dexter (played by John Thaw in Inspector Morse, and Shaun Evans in the prequel stories Endeavour devised by Russell Lewis, based on the characters created by Colin Dexter)
- Detective William Murdoch – Murdoch Mysteries (played by Yannick Bisson)
- Detective Roger Murtaugh – Shane Black (played by Danny Glover in Lethal Weapon, Lethal Weapon 2, Lethal Weapon 3 and Lethal Weapon 4 and Damon Wayans in Lethal Weapon)
- Detective (Later Sergeant) Angie Miller — Dexter (Played by Dana L. Wilson in the tv series)
- Captain (later Deputy Chief) Thomas Matthews — Dexter (played by Geoff Pierson in the tv series)

== N ==
- Detective Zack Nichols – Law & Order: Criminal Intent (played by Jeff Goldblum)
- Detective Inspector Saga Norén – Hans Rosenfeldt (played by Sofia Helin in The Bridge)
- Detective Inspector Patricia "Pat" North – Lynda la Plante (played by Kate Buffery in Trial & Retribution)

== O ==
- Detective Juliet O'Hara – Psych (played by Maggie Lawson)
- Police Inspector Mike O'Hara – The Falcon Takes Over (played by James Gleason)
- Chief O'Hara – Batman (played by Stafford Repp)
- Brigid O'Reilly / Mayhem – Cloak & Dagger (TV series) (played by Emma Lahana)
- Detective Rita Ortiz – NYPD Blue (played by Jacqueline Obradors)
- Superintendent Otani – James Melville (pseudonym of Roy Peter Martin)
- Sergeant Ottermole – Alfred Hitchcock Presents episode The Hands of Mr. Ottermole (played by Theodore Bikel)
- Inspector Owen – Frankenstein Meets the Wolf Man (played by Dennis Hoey)

== P ==
- Inspector Frans J. Palmu – (played by Joel Rinne in Inspector Palmu's Mistake)
- Detective Manny Pardo – Hotline Miami 2: Wrong Number
- Detective Inspector Charles Parker – Dorothy L. Sayers
- Detective Inspector Peter Pascoe – Reginald Hill (played by Colin Buchanan in Dalziel and Pascoe)
- Detective Inspector Charlie Peace – Robert Barnard
- Inspector Peterson – (played by Moroni Olsen in Mildred Pierce)
- Commisario Achille Peroni – Timothy Holme
- Detective Lucky Piquel – Disney Television Animation production Bonkers
- Detective Hercule Poirot - Agatha Christie
- Detective Sergeant Tom Polhaus – (played by J. Farrell MacDonald and Ward Bond)
- Detective Inspector Richard Poole – Robert Thorogood (played by Ben Miller in Death in Paradise )
- Officer Powers – (played by Purnell Pratt in The Public Enemy)
- Detective Superintendent Sandra Pullman – Nigel McCrery and Roy Mitchell (played by Amanda Redman in New Tricks)
- Detective Inspector Walter Purbright – Colin Watson
- Assistant Commissioner of Police Pradyuman – Shivaji Satam
- Detective Jacob "Jake" Peralta – Brooklyn Nine-Nine (played by Andy Samberg)

== Q ==
- Detective (later Lieutenant) Joey Quinn — Dexter (played by Desmond Harrington in the tv show)

== R ==
- Detective Inspector John Rebus – Ian Rankin (played by John Hannah and Ken Stott in Rebus)
- Detective Danny Reagan – Mitchell Burgess & Robin Green (played by Donnie Wahlberg in Blue Bloods)
- Inspector Redding – (played by Robert Edeson in The Ten Commandments)
- Detective Inspector Jack Regan – Ian Kennedy Martin (played by John Thaw 1975 to 1978 and Ray Winstone 2012 in The Sweeney)
- Inspector Renard – (played by George Pembroke in Bluebeard)
- Chief Investigator Arkady Renko – Martin Cruz Smith (played by William Hurt in Gorky Park)
- Detective Inspector Rob Reilly – Sarah Phelps (played by Killian Scott in Dublin Murders )
- Detective Oskar Rheinhardt – Frank Tallis (played by Jürgen Maurer in Vienna Blood )
- Inspector (Commissario) Luigi Alfredo Ricciardi – Maurizio De Giovanni (played by Lino Guanciale in "Il Commissario Ricciardi")
- Detective Martin Riggs – Shane Black (played by Mel Gibson in Lethal Weapon, Lethal Weapon 2, Lethal Weapon 3 and Lethal Weapon 4 and Clayne Crawford 2016 to 2018 Seann William Scott 2019 Lethal Weapon )
- Detective Inspector John River – Abi Morgan (played by Stellan Skarsgård in River )
- Detective Jane Rizzoli – Tess Gerritsen (played by Angie Harmon in Rizzoli & Isles)
- Commissioner Mihai Roman (played by Ilarion Ciobanu in five Romanian films)
- Detective Inspector Daniel Robbins – Carolyn Weston (played by Richard Hatch in The Streets of San Francisco )
- Detective Lilly Rush – Meredith Stiehm (played by Kathryn Morris in Cold Case)
- Detective Diane Russell – NYPD Blue (played by Kim Delaney)
- Detective Kevin Ryan – Andrew W. Marlowe (played by Seamus Dever in Castle)

== S ==
- Detective Frank Serpico – Frank Serpico (played by Al Pacino in Serpico)
- Detective Gloria Shepherd – The Protector (played by Ally Walker)
- Detective Bobby Simone – NYPD Blue (played by Jimmy Smits)
- Detective Andy Sipowicz (later Detective Sergeant) – NYPD Blue (played by Dennis Franz)
- Detective Constable Chris Skelton – Life on Mars/Ashes to Ashes (played by Marshall Lancaster)
- Detective Ema Skye – Ace Attorney (voiced by Erica Lindbeck)
- Detective Inspector (later Detective Superintendent) Slack – Agatha Christie (played by David Horovitch in Miss Marple)
- Detective Danny Sorenson – NYPD Blue (played by Rick Schroder)
- Detective Elliot Stabler - Law & Order: SVU and Law & Order: Organized Crime (played by Christopher Meloni)
- Detective Sergeant (Retired) Gerry Standing – Nigel McCrery and Roy Mitchell (played by Dennis Waterman in New Tricks)
- Detective Chief Inspector Vera Stanhope – Ann Cleeves (played by Brenda Blethyn in Vera)
- Lieutenant Norman Stansfield – Luc Besson (played by Gary Oldman in Léon: The Professional)
- Detective David Starsky – William Blinn and Ryan Blinn (played by Paul Michael Glaser 1975 to 1979, Ben Stiller 2004 in Starsky & Hutch)
- Detective Serena Stevens – Law & Order: Criminal Intent (played by Saffron Burrows)
- Inspector Nayland Smith – Sax Rohmer (played by O.P. Heggie and Lewis Stone)
- Police Chief Jesse Stone – Robert B. Parker (played by Tom Selleck)
- Detective Lieutenant Michael Stone – Carolyn Weston (played by Karl Malden in The Streets of San Francisco)
- Detective Milo Sturgis (later Lieutenant) – Jonathan Kellerman
- Chief Inspector Ukyō Sugishita – Aibō (played by Yutaka Mizutani)
- Detective Sunday – American Gigolo
- Sergeant Katsuya Suou - Persona 2: Eternal Punishment
- Superintendent Sutherland – (played by Aubrey Mather in The Lodger)
- Detective Bill Szymanski – Person of Interest (played by Mike McGlone)

== T ==
- Detective Chief Inspector Jim Taggart – Glenn Chandler (played by Mark McManus in Taggart)
- Lieutenant Raymond Tango – Randy Feldman and Jeffrey Boam (played by Sylvester Stallone in Tango & Cash )
- Inspector Charles Tarran – Alfred Hitchcock Presents episode The Impromptu Murder (played by Robert Douglas)
- Detective Mac Taylor – CSI: NY (played by Gary Sinise)
- Detective Chief Inspector Jane Tennison – Lynda La Plante (played by Helen Mirren in Prime Suspect)
- Detective Raymond Terney – Person of Interest (played by Al Sapienza)
- Detective Inspectors Thomson and Thompson (original French: Dupont et Dupond) – Hergé (played by Simon Pegg and Nick Frost in The Adventures of Tintin: The Secret of the Unicorn)
- Detective Inspector Tom Thorne – Mark Billingham (played by David Morrissey in the Sky One series Thorne)
- Detective Inspector Fred Thursday – Russell Lewis, based on the characters created by Colin Dexter (played by Roger Allam in Endeavour)
- Lieutenant Moe Tilden – James Mangold (played by Robert De Niro in Cop Land )
- Detective Inspector Anna Travis – Lynda La Plante (played by Kelly Reilly in Above Suspicion)
- Detective Sergeant Ricardo "Rico" Tubbs – Anthony Yerkovich (played by Philip Michael Thomas 1984 to 1990 and Jamie Foxx 2006 in Miami Vice)
- Detective Sergeant Fin Tutuola - Law & Order: Special Victims Unit (Played by Ice-T)
- Detective Inspector Sam Tyler – Matthew Graham, Tony Jordan and Ashley Pharoah (played by John Simm in Life on Mars)

== V ==
- Commissaris Simon 'Piet' Van der Valk – Nicolas Freeling (played by Wolfgang Kieling 1968 TV Movie, Barry Foster from 1972 to 1992 in Van der Valk, and by Marc Warren 2020 to present in the reboot Van der Valk)
- DCI Van Veeteren – Håkan Nesser
- Detective Van Zwam from the comics series The Adventures of Nero
- Detective Ray Vecchio - Due South (played by David Marciano)
- Detective Vic Varallo – Elizabeth Linington writing as Leslie Egan
- His Grace Commander Sir Samuel Vimes, Duke of Ankh – Terry Pratchett, Discworld

== W ==
- Detective Chief Superintendent Michael "Mike" Walker – Lynda la Plante (played by David Hayman in Trial & Retribution )
- Detective Sergeant Tim "Freebie" Walker – Robert Kaufman and Floyd Mutrux (played by James Caan in "Freebie and the Bean" )
- Kriminalkommissarie Kurt Wallander – Henning Mankell (played by Rolf Lassgård 1994 to 2007, Krister Henriksson 2005 to 2006 and Kenneth Branagh 2008 to 2016)
- Detective Inspector Eric Wardle – Robert Galbraith (played by Killian Scott in Strike )
- Inspector John Warwick – (played by George Sanders in The Lodger)
- Detective Neal Washington – Hill Street Blues (played by Taurean Blacque)
- Detective Sergeant John Watt – Troy Kennedy Martin and Allan Prior (played by Frank Windsor in Z-Cars and Softly, Softly )
- Detective Joe West – Greg Berlanti, Andrew Kreisberg, and Geoff Johns (played by Jesse L. Martin in The Flash)
- Detective Chief Inspector Reginald Wexford – Ruth Rendell (played by George Baker in The Ruth Rendell Mysteries)
- Detective Megan Wheeler – Law & Order: Criminal Intent (played by Julianne Nicholson)
- Inspector Wilcox – (played by John Fraser in Scarlett)
- Sergeant Wilkes – (played by E. E. Clive in Dracula's Daughter)
- Detective Williams – Steve Martin & John Hoffman (played by Da'Vine Joy Randolph in Only Murders in the Building)
- Inspector Williams – (played by Donald MacBride in Here Comes Mr. Jordan)
- Detective Chief Inspector Charlie Wise – Jimmy McGovern (played by Ricky Tomlinson in Cracker )
- Detective Superintendent Charles Wycliffe – W. J. Burley (played by Jack Shepherd in Wycliffe)
- Detective Claudette Wallace — Dexter: Resurrection (Played by Kadia Saraf)

== Z ==
- Commisario Aurelio Zen – Michael Dibdin (played by Rufus Sewell in Zen)
- Inspector Koichi Zenigata – Lupin the Third
