= Imaginary Man =

Imaginary man

Studio album by NaNa
- Released: June 26, 2002 (Japan); March 15, 2007 (U.S.)
- Genre: Downtempo, trip hop, experimental rock, alternative rock
- Label: Warner Music Japan
- Producer: Shigeo Tamaru

Imaginary man is NaNa's second album, released on June 26, 2002, by Warner Music Japan. As with their last album "VOID", the recording, mix-down and mastering on the new album has taken place in Tokyo, London and New York. It is composed of the 12 songs. The very NaNa songs are listed from the start of this album. These all have a strong individuality, catchy and high quality. If the "VOID" had been made using a lot of experimental approach, this "Imaginary man" with considering of the same flow has moreover came to the article that bring maturity. The album was released in the United States in 2007.

== Credits ==
- Chikako Watanabe – vocals and keyboard on track
- Shigeo Tamaru – producer, arrangement, guitars and all other instruments
- Recorded by Shigeo Tamaru and Kenji Nagashima at Sidekick Studio, Yokohama, Japan, and at Kangaroo Studio, Idea Sound, Onkio Haus, Tokyo, Japan.
- Mixed by Clive Goddard at Strongroom, London.
- Assisted by Myles Clarke, Tom Paterson at Strongroom, London.
- Mastered by Ted Jensen at Sterling Sound, New York.

== Track listing ==
1. "The Blue Bird"
2. "Anonymous Letter"
3. "Primrose Path"
4. "IV silence"
5. "C-357"
6. "Cyberface Run"
7. "Child's Play"
8. "Mother"
9. "The cry of the wondering spirit"
10. "JUDY"
11. "Iris"
12. "Acacia"
