= The 3rd Birthday =

2010 video game

- North American cover art
- Developer: HexaDrive
- Publisher: Square Enix
- Director: Hajime Tabata
- Producer: Yoshinori Kitase
- Programmer: Kogi Sugimoto
- Artist: Isamu Kamikokuryo
- Writers: Toshimitsu Takeuchi; Motomu Toriyama
- Composers: Mitsuto Suzuki; Tsuyoshi Sekito; Yoko Shimomura
- Series: Parasite Eve
- Platform: PlayStation Portable
- Release: JP: December 22, 2010; NA: March 29, 2011; EU: April 1, 2011
- Genres: Action role-playing, third-person shooter
- Mode: Single-player

The 3rd Birthday (Japanese: ザ・サード バースデイ, Hepburn: Za Sādo Bāsudei) is a 2010 action role-playing game developed by HexaDrive and published by Square Enix for the PlayStation Portable. It was released in Japan in 2010 and in North America and Europe in 2011. The game is the third entry in the Parasite Eve video game series, based on the titular Japanese novel, and a spin-off, having only a loose connection to events from past games. The game features a third-person shooter-based combat system with role-playing mechanics. A key mechanic is the Overdive ability, which allows the player to possess pre-positioned human allies and inflict damage upon enemies.

The game takes place in 2013, a year after creatures known as the Twisted have appeared from beneath Manhattan and decimated the city. To fight back against the Twisted, an investigatory team called the Counter Twisted Investigation (CTI) is formed. Among their number is series protagonist Aya Brea, who was found unconscious and suffering amnesia two years before the game's events. Using her Overdive ability, Aya travels into the past to alter the outcome of battles against the Twisted. At the same time, Aya attempts to find out the origin of the Twisted and regain her memories.

The 3rd Birthday was created as a conceptual rebirth for Aya's character, as well as a means of re-introducing her to the gaming community, with it being over a decade since the last game in the series. Among the staff were Hajime Tabata, Yoshinori Kitase, Motomu Toriyama, Isamu Kamikokuryo, and Aya's original designer Tetsuya Nomura. Originally announced as an episodic title for mobile phones, the game was later changed into a PSP exclusive. Upon release, the game reached sixth place in Japanese sales charts, and was among the top five games in North American and UK sales charts during its opening months.

Reviews have been mixed; critics praised the presentation and several parts of the gameplay, while opinions were mixed about the story, and many cited difficulties with camera control and some of the shooter mechanics.

It is currently the last title in the Parasite Eve series. Executive producer and Square Enix executive Shinji Hashimoto said in 2017 that it was up to Nomura if the series would return.

== Gameplay ==
Combat in The 3rd Birthday. Shown is Aya in battle with a Twisted, along with the health of selectable human units, her ammo count, and other HUD displays.

The 3rd Birthday is a third-person role-playing shooter. The player controls series protagonist Aya Brea through rendered-to-scale environments in from a third-person perspective. The game plays out as a series of missions, between which Aya rests at the Counter Twisted Investigation headquarters, which acts as the game's main hub. In the hub, Aya can receive briefings for missions, view additional documents, buy and customize new weapons. She also has the option to transport back there should she die during a mission. The game can be saved both at the hub and in safe zones within missions. At the end of each mission, Aya is given a grade based on performance, enemies killed, and the number of times she died. Depending on her score, she will earn differing amounts of Bounty Points, a currency used to customize weapons and repair protective gear in the hub area.

During missions, players navigate a series of linear linked areas fighting off multiple enemies. Items can be picked up during missions, such as grenades and medical kits. Aya has access to multiple guns for use in combat, including handguns, assault rifles and shotguns. By holding down a button on the controller, Aya automatically aims at an enemy and can fire at will. Taking cover behind objects or shields, or standing idle outside of battle, allows Aya to regenerate health. While in combat, an energy meter is charged and can be activated when full. When activated, Aya enters "Liberation Mode", a state enabling her to move around the battlefield at high speed for a short period of time.

In most battle situations, Aya is accompanied by a group of allied NPC (non-playable character) soldiers that the player can direct around the battle area. Available commands include offering supporting fire, directly attacking enemies, or staying behind cover. They can also all fire at the same enemy in certain situations, dealing high damage. Each NPC has a separate health meter, and is permanently removed from battle upon defeat. Central to combat is Overdive, an ability which enables Aya to transmit herself between bodies. If her health is low, Aya can transport herself into the body of an allied NPC, taking on their health level, position and current weapon in the process. NPCs not controlled by Aya are controlled by the game's AI. Aya can remain in a body for the duration of a level, or until the unit has died. If Aya cannot jump to another body, she dies and the level must either be restarted or exited. Overdive can be activated at any time, enabling Aya to transport around the battlefield to avoid enemy attacks or save herself when her current unit's health is low. Overdive can also be used to attack enemies if Aya maintains a sustained assault. After a time, a triangle icon appears on enemies, allowing her to perform an Overdive attack, dealing high damage to the targeted enemy.

During combat, Aya gains experience points and gains experience levels when a certain quantity is achieved. Gaining a level both restores her health and raises her maximum health and energy levels. Weapons also gain levels the more they are used. In addition to leveling up, Aya's stats can be customized using Over Energy (OE) clips found during missions or acquired during Overdive attacks. Using a 3x3 grid accessed in the hub area, certain OE clips grant different stat boosts and abilities. Creating a new grid automatically deletes the effects of the original.

== Plot ==
The game's story plays out in episodes, similar to a television series, with many events told out of sequence. On Christmas Eve of 2012, monstrous creatures dubbed as "Babels" appear in New York City. Along with lifeforms spawned by them called the Twisted, they lay waste to the city and consume any human in their path. By the following year, an investigatory team known as the CTI (Counter Twisted Investigation) has been formed. One of the CTI members is Aya Brea, who was found outside St. Thomson's Cathedral in 2010, just before the Babels and Twisted began appearing. Dr. Hyde Bohr, Chief of the CTI, finds that Aya is suffering from amnesia, and that her personality has changed. After taking Aya in, the CTI discovered that she was capable of transferring her soul from body to body independent of time, an ability dubbed "Overdive", which enables her to fight the Twisted.

Bohr and the others planned to use this unique ability to travel back through time and prevent the disaster, developing a machine called "Overdive System" to allow Aya to travel into the past and change events. As she embarks on each mission, she is confronted by powerful, sentient Twisted born from corrupted humans, later dubbed High Ones. One such High One is Kyle Madigan, a man she met and fell in love with during Parasite Eve II. As she defeats each High One, she regains pieces of her memory, most prominently her memories of being engaged to Kyle, and the existence of Eve Brea, her adopted sister. After an incident that saw the CTI HQ and the Overdive device destroyed by the Kyle High One, Aya reunites with Kunihiko Maeda, a man who aided her in Parasite Eve to resolve the entire mystery behind the appearance of the Babel, Twisted and High Ones. Aya eventually discovers that Bohr is himself a High One. Bohr masterminded the death of other High Ones in order to form the Grand Babel, which functions like a giant Overdive system. Bohr seeks to dive back in the past to Time Zero, the point where events were set in motion, to fulfill his plan for the survival of his own species from a time war cycle between humans, the Twisted, and the High Ones. Aya battles Bohr and is pulled with him into Time Zero, where she discovers the truth.

In 2010 at St. Thomson's Cathedral, Aya and Kyle were going to be married. The Cathedral was attacked by a SWAT team and Aya was killed. Eve attempted to save Aya by sending her consciousness into Aya's body, creating the Overdive ability. The event caused Aya's consciousness to separate from her body and fragment through time to create the Twisted, Eve's consciousness became trapped in Aya's body while parts of Eve's body were transplanted into the people close to them creating the High Ones. The "Aya" of the main story is in fact Eve in Aya's body. After these revelations, Eve returns to her body and is asked by Bohr to assimilate him and trigger the birth of a new species. Eve refuses, and when Bohr tries to force the process, a reborn Aya shoots him to death. Aya then reveals that to avert the birth of the Twisted and High Ones, the sources (Aya and Eve) must be removed. Expressing her regret of not being able to marry Kyle, she tells Eve to shoot her. In a fit of emotion, Eve switches bodies with Aya before shooting her, creating a new timeline where Eve's body and Aya's consciousness do not exist, erasing the game's events. Though Eve offers to marry Kyle, he refuses and hints that he is going to find Aya. In a post-credits sequence four years after the game's events, Eve is walking the streets of New York and is wished a "Happy Fourth Birthday" by a woman resembling Aya.

== Development ==
Concepts for a third installment in the Parasite Eve video game series had been around for some time. As work was being finished on Crisis Core: Final Fantasy VII, Nomura voiced his wish to create a new game for the character Aya Brea, and this time it was taken up. Despite the story of Parasite Eve II not leaving many avenues for a sequel, the development team wanted to take advantage of advancing gaming technology and popularity by creating a mature gaming experience that would re-introduce Aya to players around the world. The main staff consisted of director Hajime Tabata, producer Yoshinori Kitase, creative producer and character designer Tetsuya Nomura, art director Isamu Kamikokuryo, scenario director Motomu Toriyama, and main writer Toshimitsu Takeuchi. Nomura requested Tabata as the two had worked well together on previous projects, and Nomura was busy with other projects despite his strong interest. The 3rd Birthday was originally announced in May 2007 as an episodic mobile game developed by Square Enix for Japan's FOMA mobile service. In 2008, during a special Square Enix event, the game was announced to have changed to a game for the PlayStation Portable. Part of the reason, as stated by Nomura, was that the desired level of realism was not possible on mobile phones. The game became exclusive to PSP as Tabata wanted to make full usage of the platform's hardware capabilities, along with it being a gaming platform available worldwide. Tabata and his team worked on The 3rd Birthday at the same time as fellow mobile-turned-PSP title Final Fantasy Type-0. Square Enix requested Tabata to concentrate on finishing The 3rd Birthday, leading to Type-0 almost being cancelled.

The final version of the game was co-developed by Square Enix and HexaDrive, a company created by former Capcom staff members. As the new form of The 3rd Birthday had transformed into a third-person shooter, Square Enix wanted staff members with experience at developing such games, and then-company CEO Yoichi Wada recommended HexaDrive to Tabata. As multiple HexaDrive staff members had also worked on fellow shooter Lost Planet: Extreme Condition, Tabata agreed to the collaboration. While aiming for a high quality product, the team designed the game as if for the PlayStation 3 home console, then worked to fit it onto the PSP. During development, the team sought creative help from the team developing Final Fantasy XIII for the visual design. The team had previously experimented with shooters with Dirge of Cerberus: Final Fantasy VII, but this time they wanted to create something closer to a third-person shooter. The team was assembled by Tabata based on their development experience with action games. While working inside the control and hardware limitations of the title, the team created firearms and the lock-on mechanic as the fundamental attack action, instead of the free-roaming style of a standard third-person shooter. While designing levels to function with the game's Overdive system, the team considered what the level would hold, how often players would utilize the function, the difficulty of levels, and the positioning and strength of enemies. During development, a questionnaire was circulated around company staff concerning the character Aya, to find out which of the planned features were popular. One of those that survived in the final game was Aya's clothes being damaged when she was hit by an enemy. Nomura was among the first to suggest this feature originally, tying it with increased enemy difficulty to present a dilemma to players who "might purposely make her take damage just to see more of her body".

Nomura worked on the character designs for the main cast. He was originally only going to work on Aya and Eve, but after seeing the settings for the other characters, he offered to design them too. The team wanted to emphasize the character's sexuality. As part of this, the team included a scene where Aya takes a shower. This was inspired by a similar scene in Parasite Eve II. When the title was being developed for PSP, the team's main challenge with the character was to make her look as realistic as possible while retaining her established physical traits. Using this new realism, the team wanted to portray the fear felt by humans when faced with such threats through Aya. Achieving this realism proved one of the most difficult aspects of development. Her alternate costumes were not a high priority for the team, so their artists had high creative freedom.

While many of the concepts for the final version were present in the original mobile version, such as Overdive and the Twisted, the original story was scrapped when the game came to upgraded platforms. In creating the story for The 3rd Birthday, the team took inspiration from the 10-year gap in the character's in-game and real-time history. This meant that it would be difficult to create a straightforward sequel, so the team instead decided to make the game about Aya's return. Toriyama imagined story concepts such as the snowy New York setting and the image of a bloodstained wedding dress. These two concepts survived the platform upgrade. Over the course of the development, he adjusted the plot numerous times to be more adult-oriented and to include complex narrative twists. The original concept was to make the game feel like a television drama, with multiple cliffhangers and moments of high drama. The game was designed from the outset as having no direct connection to the previous Parasite Eve games. The game's title came from it being Aya's third video game appearance, as well as it being a noticeable change in setting. The game's logo was designed to both look like the letter "B" and the number "3". It was originally only going to represent the number, but Nomura added the extra lines to display the game's "multi-faceted" nature. A notable addition was the option to skip cutscenes, a feature the team regretted leaving out of Crisis Core.

== Music ==
The music for The 3rd Birthday was composed by Mitsuto Suzuki and Tsuyoshi Sekito, with additional work by original Parasite Eve composer Yoko Shimomura. Shimomura was involved from an early stage, when The 3rd Birthday was still a mobile game. When she was originally asked to compose for the title, she was involved with a number of other projects which made handling the entire score difficult. When asked whether she wanted to work with anyone on the composition, she suggested Suzuki and Sekito. The general instruction was to follow the pattern used by the music for Parasite Eve, with Suzuki and Sekito handling the majority of tracks, going so far as referring to the songs from the original Parasite Eve when handling remixes of old themes. In keeping with the game's other development goals, Shimomura wanted to alter some of the established music, although she asked the team to include familiar themes from earlier games for fans. Suzuki was responsible for a large amount of track mixing. Sekito was mostly involved with choosing and helping with instrumentation, in particular whether to include symphonic music. The composers had a relatively high degree of freedom, but they also had problems when composing some tracks that did not fit into selected scenes. Re-orchestrations of two pieces of classical music, "Sleepers Wake" by Johann Sebastian Bach, and "Joy to the World", a popular Christmas song, were used by Suzuki and Shimomura respectively to represent key moments and motifs within the game. The order of songs in the game was created to reflect the situation in a level. These variations were emphasized during mixing, while they also needed to adjust the mixing and track length based on the game as a whole. For the game's theme song, the company collaborated with Japanese rock band Superfly. The game's theme song Eyes on Me, described as a "standard love song", was specially composed by the band for the game. It was the band's first video game theme song. The game's soundtrack was released as an album by Square Enix on December 22, 2010. The 3rd Birthday Original Soundtrack contains 66 tracks across 3 discs and has a total length of 2:56:52.

== Reception ==
Reception

Aggregate score
Aggregator	Score
Metacritic	71/100

Review scores
Publication	Score
1Up.com	B−
Eurogamer	6/10
Famitsu	9/10, 10/10, 8/10, 9/10
Game Informer	6.7/10
GameSpot	6/10
IGN	8.5/10
VideoGamer.com	8/10

During production, Nomura and Tabata stated that the team were aiming to sell 500,000 copies of the game, a sales-goal based strategy they had previously used for Crisis Core. During its first week, The 3rd Birthday debuted at #6 in Japanese gaming charts, selling 140,000 units. By the end of 2011, the game had sold 353,747 units in Japan. The game reached the top of the charts for PSP games in North America by the beginning of April 2011, overtaking fellow Square Enix title Dissidia 012: Final Fantasy and the PSP port of The Legend of Heroes: Trails in the Sky. Later that month, it had fallen to #3 in US charts, remaining there into June of that year. In the UK during the same initial period, it reached #3, tailing behind Dissidia 012 and Lego Star Wars III: The Clone Wars.

Japanese gaming magazine Famitsu praised the title's gameplay, calling Aya "deeply customizable", finding the Overdive system and its strategic elements exhilarating and saying that those undaunted by the high difficulty would find much enjoyment in repeated playthroughs. Jeremy Parish of 1UP.com called it "an interesting blend of RPG and shooter", praising the working of Overdive. Eurogamer's Kristan Reed was less enthusiastic, referring to the conflicts with the Twisted as "relentless and ultimately repetitive", finding the high difficulty off-putting and Aya's movement speed unsuited for battle. Game Informer's Annette Gonzalez enjoyed the control layout and gameplay, but cited difficulties with the camera. Carolyn Petit of GameSpot said that the game sometimes succeeded in creating tension, but that other battles were frustrating and the camera was difficult. IGN's Patrick Kolan was pleased with the effort put into the game, and generally praised the battle and later levels, despite several cases of repetition during the main campaign. Emily Gera of VideoGamer.com found the basic shooter gameplay repetitive, but felt that the gameplay was saved by the Overdive ability and the quality of fights.

Parish said the game looked "gorgeous" and the soundtrack "exceptional". Petit praised the CGI cutscenes and varied level environments, and said the score "shifts adeptly between haunting and thrilling to suit the action." Kolan generally called the game one of the best-looking entries on the platform, and praised the soundtrack, despite it being "a little ho-hum". Gonzalez also praised the cutscenes, while citing the environments as "[ranging] from detailed to drab".

Famitsu was less positive about the story, saying that the mix of different elements made it "a bit hard to follow." Parish positively noted connections to the second game, but found the later story developments either confusing or weak, and disliked the way returning supporting characters had been changed. Petit said that those who wanted a straightforward story would be disappointed, and positively noted its exploration of existence, identity, and memory. Her main criticism was with the dialogue, which she referred to as "stilted". Kolan also faulted the voice acting and localization, especially when compared to games such as Tactics Ogre: Let Us Cling Together. Gonzalez cited the story as intriguing, with "plenty of plot twists". Parish and Petit were both highly critical of Aya's portrayal: Parish disliked both her outfit, which seemed to conform too much female stereotypes in video games, and the clothes-tearing mechanic, which seemed to be included merely to flaunt her sexuality. Petit shared many points of criticism with Parish, also noting that Aya's portrayal of "one-part action hero, one-part submissive sex object" was wrong for a lead character, and that Aya's in-combat vocals were not suited to the game's situations. Reed referred to Aya as "[a] sighing, whimpering lead character".
