= Parasite Eve (novel) =

1995 novel by Hideaki Sena

- First edition
- Author: Hideaki Sena
- Original title: Parasaito Ibu
- Translator: Tyran Grillo
- Cover artist: Chip Kidd
- Language: Japanese
- Genre: Science fiction, Horror novel
- Publisher: Vertical, Inc., (New York)
- Publication date: 1995
- Publication place: Japan
- English publication date: 2005
- Media type: Print (Hardback & Paperback)
- Pages: 320
- ISBN: 978-1-932234-19-0
- OCLC: 63042620

Parasite Eve (パラサイト・イヴ, Parasaito Ivu) is a Japanese science fiction horror novel by Hideaki Sena, first published by Kadokawa in 1995. The book was published in North America by Vertical, Inc. in 2005.

Parasite Eve was adapted into a film and manga series. It was later expanded into three video games which is centered on a different character named Aya Brea; two that serve as sequels to the novel, along with a spin-off third game. The video games have also been adapted into a manga series.

== Plot ==
Mitochondria are the "power house" of biological cells. It is thought that they were originally separate organisms, and a symbiotic relationship between them and early cellular life has evolved into their present position as cell organelles with no independent existence (see endosymbiotic theory).

The novel's plot supposes that mitochondria, which are inherited through the female line of descent, form the dispersed body of an intelligent conscious life-form, dubbed Eve, which has been waiting throughout history and evolution for the right conditions when mitochondrial life can achieve its true potential and take over from eukaryotic life-forms (i.e. humans and similar life) by causing a child to be born that can control its own genetic code.

Eve is able to control people's minds and bodies by signaling to the mitochondria in their bodies. She can cause thoughts to occur to them to the point of mind control and also make them undergo spontaneous combustion by signaling all of the mitochondria in their body to produce energy all at once.

The conditions Eve has waited for have arrived; she has found the perfect host in the body of Kiyomi Nagishima. At the start of the book, Eve is the mitochondria in Kiyomi's body. She causes Kiyomi to crash her car; Kiyomi survives but is brain dead. Kiyomi's husband is Toshiaki, a research assistant teaching and researching biological science. Eve manipulates Toshiaki to ensure that one of Kiyomi's kidneys is transplanted into the teenage girl Mariko Anzai as an organ donation. As part of Kiyomi's body, the kidney is also a part of Eve; this prepares Mariko to be a suitable host for giving birth to mitochondrial life, as her immune system would otherwise rebel.

Eve influences Toshiaki to grow some of Kiyomi's liver cells in his lab in sufficient quantities to provide Eve with an independent body, he thinks that he is doing this as an experiment using different cultures of the liver cells. Forming some of the cells into a body, Eve possesses Toshiaki's assistant Sachiko Asakura and intermittently takes control of Asakura to work upon the cultures. Eventually, she takes control of Asakura during a conference presentation speech and announces her presence. Leaving Asakura's body, she returns to the lab. Toshiaki pursues her, and she rapes him in the form of Kiyomi to capture some of his sperm, which she uses to fertilize an egg of her own production. Moving to the hospital, she implants this egg in Mariko's womb. The egg develops into a child that is born almost immediately and grows into an adult form seconds after birth.

Eve anticipates that her child will be able to consciously change its genetic code, thus being an infinitely adaptable "perfect life form" capable of replacing humanity and similar life-forms. Mariko's body will be host to a new race of these life-forms.

The experiment fails, since Toshiaki's sperm carry a separate line of "male" mitochondria inherited through sperm that will be wiped out in the new order; these resist the change by fighting for control of the child's body, causing it to switch between male and female forms. Toshiaki sacrifices himself by merging his body with the child's causing them both to die and to control the bursts of psychokinetic-like power it gives out in its death throes that threaten to kill many people.

In the novel's epilogue, it is revealed that some samples of the Eve cells in Toshiaki's lab survived. However, they are destroyed shortly after being found.

== Development and inspiration ==
Sena had a background in pharmacology and his day job consisted of testing mitochondria with various drugs for their ability to convert fatty acids into energy. A television documentary he viewed got him thinking about the idea that mitochondria had a will of their own and did not feel like keeping up their end of the symbiotic relationship.

== Release and reception ==
The original book, Parasite Eve by Hideaki Sena, became the first winner of the Japan Horror Novel Award. It was later translated into English by Tyran Grillo for Vertical Inc. and released in December 2005.

Library Journal noted that "Sena's work in pharmacology and microbiology lends this Japanese import a sense of discovery and fear that resonates when new science is not fully understood", and recommended the book to science fiction and horror fans who had enjoyed Suzuki Koji's The Ring and films like White Noise.

== Franchise ==
=== Popular culture and merchandise ===
Parasite Eve was popular in Japan, and was a part of the "J-horror" phenomena along with other fiction such as The Ring. The book led to three video game adaptations, a book-based manga comic and another manga adaptation based upon the video game universe called "Parasite Eve DIVA". The Parasite Eve film was so popular in Japan that a scientific study asking citizens what color mitochondria are stated that they are colored green, similar to what was presented in the movie.

=== Film ===
In 1997, a film adaptation of the Parasite Eve novel was released in Japan. Parasite Eve was directed by Masayuki Ochiai and written by Ryoichi Kimizuka. The film was produced by Fuji TV and distributed to the United States by ADV Films and by Fuji in Europe. ADV premiered the film on June 18, 2000, for a limited theatrical run. It was later released on DVD on August 14, 2001. The film does not contain an English dub track and is subtitled in hardsubs. The adaptation follows the storyline of the book but has a different ending. Variety projected the film take in 100 million yen ($826, 446) during its five-week run in about 150 Japanese theaters.

=== Print adaptations ===
Two manga series were released in the Parasite Eve series. The first series was a manga under the same name of the novel. The story follows the same events of the original novel and was written by Shikaku, illustrated by Fujiki Noriko and published in Asuka Comics DX. It was released in March 1998.

The second series is two volumes in total and is titled Parasite Eve Diva ― N. Y. Shi no utahime (パラサイト・イヴDIVA―N.Y.死の歌姫, lit. Parasite Eve Diva: N.Y. Diva of Death). The manga serves as an adaptation for the video game with some altered events. It was written by Fuji Takashi Toshiko and was also published by Asuka Comics DX. A total of two volumes were released: the first volume was released on September 25, 1998, and the second volume was released in July 1999.

=== Video games ===
Parasite Eve is the first video game in the series, produced by Squaresoft and centered on a New York City police officer named Aya Brea. It was released in 1998 for the Sony PlayStation. Sena approved of the game, stating that he was "actually impressed how well the game makers translated the novel." The game was developed in both America and Japan. It serves as a sequel to the novel. Parasite Eve II is the sequel to the original game, released for the PlayStation, for Japan in 1999 and worldwide in 2000. The 3rd Birthday is the third game of the Parasite Eve series and was released in 2010 for the PlayStation Portable. The game was originally announced for DoCoMo cell phones, but was later confirmed exclusive for the PSP at the Tokyo Game Show 2008 presskits. The nature of the game was more of a spin-off of the previous games. It serves as a spiritual successor to the Parasite Eve series, containing little of the content about the endosymbiotic theory. The first two games, Parasite Eve and Parasite Eve II, had shipped over 3 million copies worldwide by 2010.
