= Aya Brea =

Video game character

- Parasite Eve character
- Aya Brea from Parasite Eve
- First appearance: Parasite Eve (1998)
- Created by: Hironobu Sakaguchi
- Designed by: Tetsuya Nomura
- Voiced by: English: Kathy Sokol (Parasite Eve II) Yvonne Strahovski (The 3rd Birthday); Japanese: Yumiko Shaku (Parasite Eve II) Maaya Sakamoto (The 3rd Birthday)

Aya Brea (Japanese: アヤ・ブレア, Hepburn: Aya Burea) is the main protagonist of the video game adaptations of the 1995 novel Parasite Eve by Square Enix (formerly Square or SquareSoft). An original character created by producer Hironobu Sakaguchi for the 1998 role-playing video game Parasite Eve, she is an NYPD detective who faces off against Eve, a being created by sentient mitochondria wishing to conquer life on Earth. In the 1999 sequel Parasite Eve II, Aya, now working for the FBI, is investigating further activities involving mitochondria. In the 2010 game The 3rd Birthday, an amnesiac Aya is found by the Counter Twisted Investigation (CTI) unit to fight against the "Twisted", mitochondria-spawned creatures that have gradually taken over the world.

Tetsuya Nomura was largely responsible for Aya's design after her original artist failed to realize Sakaguchi's vision for the character. Nomura ended up blending two different character designs to create her final appearance. He also returned to design her in subsequent sequels of Parasite Eve. Aya's depiction in The 3rd Birthday was meant to make her likeable for both men and women while retaining her sex appeal.

Aya Brea is an early example of a prominent female lead character in the video game industry who was notable for her down-to-earth qualities. However, The 3rd Birthday's destructible clothing mechanism and unlockable scene which shows the character showering nude had received some criticism for the gratuitous depiction of her sex appeal.

== Creation and development ==
Aya Brea was created by Hironobu Sakaguchi, the producer for Parasite Eve, and designed by Tetsuya Nomura. Aya was originally being designed by another artist, but the sketches did not satisfy Sakaguchi, who had wanted a long-haired character like Aerith Gainsborough, a central character from Final Fantasy VII. At the time, Nomura was creating another unspecified character for a different project who sported short hair: he got confused while designing them and accidentally combined the two designs, creating the then-current Aya. The original concept for her was to have her as strong, sexy and "bewitching". Her design in Parasite Eve II was to have been handled by a different artist, using her original design as a template. Although most of the design was finalized, the designer quit halfway through the game's development. As the in-game model had already been created, Nomura had to step in to finalize the design and preserve what had already been done while adding touches of his own.

Nomura returned to design both Aya and Eve Brea for the 2010 spin-off game The 3rd Birthday. Although he had originally only meant to design those two characters, he ended up designing the entire main cast. A challenge for the game's developers was to make her seem realistic when compared to her previous appearances, while retaining her established physical traits. Using this new realism, the team wanted to portray the fear felt by humans when faced with such threats through Aya. Another change introduced by Nomura was to make her less stocky than the original design, which Nomura was always uncomfortable about. Aya's alternate costumes include a knight, a maid, and an office worker. Her alternate costumes were not a high priority for the team, so their artists had high creative freedom. One of her outfits from The 3rd Birthday serves as an alternate outfit for Lightning in the fighting game Dissidia 012 Final Fantasy, who is also portrayed by Aya's Japanese voice actress Maaya Sakamoto; in turn, one of Aya's own alternate costumes in The 3rd Birthday is Lightning's. Nomura indicate that some of Aya's alternate costumes is incorporated with different voice acting as a feature in order to showcase Aya's Japanese voice actress.

Aya's sex appeal became a central element to The 3rd Birthday. In terms of gameplay, Aya's clothes provides defensive value but will gradually degrade as she takes damage, ultimately reduced into rags that barely cover her body if not consistently repaired. Like Parasite Eve 2, The 3rd Birthday includes a scene which depicts Aya showering nude. Square Enix kept track of the number of views received by the scene, which is incorporated into the game as an unlockable feature. Commenting on the notion that the game portrays Aya to be "erotic and sexy", director Hajime Tabata and producer Yoshinori Kitase claimed that it was not intentional but rather incidental. Tabata explained in an interview that Aya's redesign is meant to make her appealing to both men and women while keeping her "sexiness" at the same time, and that the team had not anticipated that it would attract a lot of attention. Tabata emphasized that through the clothing destruction mechanic, the team wanted to "communicate the feeling of a fierce battleground". Kitase claimed that Aya Brea's clothes being gradually destroyed as she fights is "plausible and realistic", and was unconcerned if people were sexually aroused by it. Tabata provided conflicted responses in response to questions about Aya's destructible clothing mechanism for the playable demo of The 3rd Birthday at the Tokyo Game Show: he disclosed insight on how to reduce the amount of clothing on Aya's character model, but also implored players to "please play normally" and not linger at her state of undress.

Australian actress Yvonne Strahovski voiced Aya in the English localization of The 3rd Birthday. Strahovski was "immediately interested" when approached to play Aya Brea, as she considers herself to be a fan of the character. Having grown used to playing strong and confident female characters, Strahovski liked Aya's initial vulnerability and the emotional growth she had during the story. As she needed to convey these feelings during her performance, Strahovski found voicing Aya "fun and challenging". She also felt that people could relate to Aya as she was "normal" in most respects.

By the late 2010s, Square had expressed an interest in revisiting the Parasite Eve video game series in some form. Kitase said in a 2020 interview with professional wrestler Kenny Omega that the series' characters "are very deep and rich, especially Aya Brea," and that it would be a waste if their story arcs are not continued.

== Appearances ==
According to the games' backstory, Aya Brea was born in Boston, Massachusetts on November 20, 1972. She is of mixed ethnicity, as her father was of European descent and her mother, Mariko, was Japanese. Due to this, she has Asian facial features, such as the shape of her face and eyes, while possessing blue eyes and fair blonde hair. Aya had a sister named Maya who, along with her mother, died in a car accident in December 1977. At a very young age, she and Maya were subjects of the evil experiments of Dr. Hans Klamp. After Maya's death, her organs were preserved, which allowed for one of her corneas to be transplanted into Aya in 1986. At the same time, one of Maya's kidneys was transplanted into a young girl named Melissa Pearce, who was also an experimental subject of Klamp, and Maya's malevolent mitochondria began changing Aya and Melissa's genetic structures. As a young woman, Aya studied criminology at the University of Virginia, and was involved in their ROTC program. She later became a detective with the NYPD's 17th Precinct., forming a sort of father/daughter relationship with her partner and mentor, a veteran NYPD detective Daniel "Bo" Dollis.

Within the first six months of working at the precinct, Aya becomes deeply involved in a catastrophic event later known as the New York Blockade Incident. It begins on December 24, 1997, when she goes on a date to an opera performance at Carnegie Hall, which stars Melissa Pearce as the lead. During the performance, Maya's advanced mitochondria, which had lain dormant in Melissa for 11 years, awaken and transform her into Mitochondria Eve. As her first act against humankind, Eve kills everyone in Carnegie Hall via spontaneous human combustion, except for Aya who is immune to the effect. Over the next six days, Aya battles Eve and the creatures she spawned, known as Neo-Mitochondrial Creatures (NMCs), all across Manhattan, greatly assisted by the strange powers that she starts to exhibit. Aya later discovers that she also possesses Maya's mitochondria, transferred to her body during the corneal transplantation, but it is unable to take control of her as it did of Melissa because of Aya's evolved cell nuclei. Aya joins forces with the U.S. Navy to destroy a strain of rapidly evolving mitochondria that threatens to enslave all humanity. Eventually, she engages and defeats Eve in a showdown on Liberty Island, and, with help from Daniel and Kunihiko Maeda, a Japanese scientist assisting them with advice in these matters, also manages to destroy the Ultimate Being that Eve gave birth to, becoming a hero among the government ranks. During the game's ending, Aya and her friends try to make up for a lost Christmas by going to the opera at Carnegie Hall once again. There, Aya communicates with the entire audience's mitochondria and their eyes begin to glow red, leaving the ending ambiguous. However, if the player goes through the Chrysler Building in EX mode and defeats the Purebred Eve, there is an alternate ending where Aya loses her mitochondrial powers.

Parasite Eve 2 reveals that a few months after Eve's rampage in New York, Aya leaves left the NYPD and joined a newly formed branch of the FBI known as MIST (Mitochondrion Investigation and Suppression Team), based out of Los Angeles with a purpose to hunt down and destroy any remaining NMCs. During her time as a MIST agent, Aya always works alone due to the abnormality of her powers. However, though she chooses not to use them, she cannot truly hide them; she is never sick and appears younger than her biological age because of her awakened mitochondria that find a young, healthy host advantageous. These psychological factors have acted as a mental block on her abilities, rendering them much weaker as compared to the first game. In early September 2000, Aya is following a lead to a tiny town of Dryfield in the Mojave Desert, where she meets and forms a partnership with Kyle Madigan, a private investigator from Texas. With Kyle's co-operation, Aya soon discovers a shadow government facility called Neo-Ark, where scientists are using her DNA to breed Artificial Neo-Mitochondrial Creatures (ANMCs). To control the ANMCs, the Neo-Ark brainwashes a young girl named Eve, a clone of Aya. After discovering that Eve and the ANMCs were all made from her, Aya feels obligated to once again save humanity from an ominous fate which was ultimately the cause of her own physical existence. Following the destruction of the Neo-Ark facility, she leaves MIST and takes the young Eve in, forming a motherly/sisterly bond with her while her friend and the new director of MIST (the former boss, Eric Baldwin, was discovered to be a mole for the shadow government and arrested for treason), Rupert Broderick, pulls some strings and creates a profile for Eve, saying that she is Aya's sister. Kyle Madigan, who disappeared after the Neo Ark events, meets with Aya and Eve in New York.

During The 3rd Birthday, despite being in her late thirties, Aya still appears to be much younger, due to the awakened mitochondria in her cells. Because of this, she is also the only applicable candidate viable for the Overdive System. Aya has lost her memories as a result of unknown circumstances, which has led to a drastic change in personality since the first two Parasite Eve games: she is shown to be more vulnerable, and fights for unknown reasons. With the ability to travel through time via the Overdive System, and also having gained the new ability to body swap, Aya is the secret weapon for the human race in the fight against the new life forms called Twisted. Using a machine built by the Counter Twisted Investigation (CTI) team, Aya returns to two years in the past, when the Twisted first appeared. At the end of the game, it is revealed that the real Aya was destroyed by her own sister Eve at Time Zero, which took place during Aya's wedding to Kyle Madigan in 2010. It transpired that Eve had tried to save her but accidentally developed Overdive into Aya's body, causing Aya's soul to create the Twisted. Aya and Eve swap bodies, Eve then shoots Aya in order to prevent the twisted from being created. The game's ending shows Eve in Aya's body, meeting a mysterious woman with similar voice to Aya whose identity is left ambiguous. Kyle is also shown saying he is going to search to try and find Aya.

=== Others ===
Aya appeared in Final Fantasy Brave Exvius.

== Promotion and merchandise ==
To promote the release of Parasite Eve II, SquareSoft partnered with a website called FirstLook.com to organize an Aya Brea look-alike contest, where visitors to the website are encouraged to submit a photo of themselves or a friend. Voters were automatically entered to win a trip for two to a private launch party in Los Angeles, where they will be part of the judging panel. Five finalists were to be selected and flown to the party, where they would compete for the title and other prizes. Aya makes a cameo appearance in the 1999 racing game Chocobo Racing as a hidden character, using a police car as her vehicle, and has a promotional card in the Final Fantasy Trading Card Game.

Action figures of Aya and Melissa from the original Parasite Eve game were released together in one set by Takara. An Aya-themed wallscroll from The 3rd Birthday was released by Square Enix.

== Reception and cultural impact ==
"Parasite Eve’s Aya Brea stuck with me far more than any of her other contemporaries. In the opening opera scene, she takes control of the situation, pushing her date out of the way and seeking the source of the trouble. I didn’t really see many take-charge female characters when I was young, so this was inspiring. It helped to see a woman who was not only confident in her abilities, but who was also willing to stand up for herself and what she believed in. I look at her as a turning point for female characters in video games, representing a push for leaders who’d never been considered damsels in distress. Not only was Aya strong, she was relatable. She didn’t initially have superpowers and did her job as a New York City detective well, something any woman could do."

— Kimberley Wallace on her favorite female character.

Aya Brea's introduction in the original Parasite Eve marked the continuation of a trend during the 1990s that saw numerous video games led by strong female characters come to prominence, which in turn was partly responsible for spurring the increase in number of women who habitually play video games. Aya's blonde hair and struggle against the supernatural was suggested by GamesRadar staff as an inspiration behind American director J.J. Abrams's development of the Olivia Dunham character for the TV series Fringe. In a Turkish empirical study of player reception to the visual elements of video game characters, where respondents are asked to choose a character based on their personality and characteristics, Aya Brea came in at fourth place out of a selection of notable female characters, ahead of Jill Valentine and behind Black Widow, Lara Croft and Harley Quinn respectively.

Kimberley Wallace and Elise Favis of Game Informer praised Aya's original iteration as a "breath of fresh air for female heroines," and for having made an impact on them by instilling their interest in the video game industry. Wallace in particular praised Aya as one of the best female RPG characters for her "passion, courage, [and] dedication" in another article published by RPGFan. Nicholas Gatewood from PlayStation Lifestyle explained that Aya in the original Parasite Eve is an exemplar of a strong female protagonist without "any hint of nonsensical “girl power” silliness or out-of-place roughness forced by the writers to try to make her look strong", and compared her favorably in this regard to Lightning from the Fabula Nova Crystallis Final Fantasy series. Michael Rougeau of Complex ranked her 35th in a list of the best video game heroines in video game history, and emphasized that she was "one of the most loved" female PlayStation characters.

Commentators also noted that Aya's police background, personality and comparatively mundane attire in the first Parasite Eve make her feel more realistic in contrast to many other female protagonist characters in video games, and thus a relatable figure for women gamers. Lisa Foiles from The Escapist compared her design to an out-of-costume Samus Aran and praised her for being relatable. Ashley Oh from Polygon liked that this iteration of Aya has a "quiet, laser-focused purpose" to her mission and does not conform to typical female video game character tropes, such as being hypersexualized, a damsel in distress, or being overly eager to “be one of the guys” to overcompensate for her status as a female police officer. Kevin Schaller from GameRevolution opined that Aya was better executed as a strong and realistic protagonist compared to Lara Croft's original iteration, and paved the way for the likes of Alyx Vance and Jade from Beyond Good & Evil. Wallace considered the manner in which Parasite Eve portrayed the isolation and uncertainty Aya experienced at times as helping make her more relatable. In an article published by Vice, Kaitlin Tremblay discussed the character design for Aya as well as a number of her contemporaries; Tremblay noted her effortless transition from the glamorous black dress she wears for the opera scene in the opening of Parasite Eve, to her down-to-earth ripped jeans and tank top which represented a subversion of the notion that physical attractiveness is something women like her should strive to achieve and maintain at all times. Carolyn Gudmundson from GamesRadar noted that she held the first Parasite Eve in very high regard due to its down-to-earth depiction of Aya, as it made sense to her that Aya changed from her formal dress into a more practical attire of jeans, T-shirt and jacket for combat situations as soon as she was able to.

Aya's role and function as a player character had been the subject of discussion by academic publications. Chris Alton observed that since the video games starring Aya are played from a third person perspective, it visually reinforces the fact that the player controls Aya's actions and yet is unambiguously separate from her. There is in this case, a synthesis of player and player-character due to the unity of action, which facilitates the player's entrance into the game world of the Parasite Eve and its recreations of real-world locations in New York City, which combines and reconciles fictional elements with a significant amount of accurate real-world information, rendering the aforementioned fictional details "acceptable in the same way that the player both is and is not Aya Brea" and help establish immersion in the game's space. In her 2002 book reload. rethinking women + cyberculture, Mary Flanagan analyzed the role of video game characters like Aya as "important sites for exploring concepts of gender, knowledge and subjectivity" through their purpose as avatars and virtual bodies for players. Flanagan noted that like her contemporary Lara Croft, Aya was a character created primarily for men, and when game content is both produced and consumed by culturally dominant demographics, she believed that this leaves little space for critical questions or meaningful change. Flanagan used the sounds made by Aya's high heels as she pursues a monster at the opera as an example; it may be perceived as the game's approach to "culturally locating the majority of male players within these female limitations", and it may also be interpreted as gratification for some male players who like to watch a female character and control her moves. As a result, Aya's agency remains limited and most gameplay is tailored to the player's desire even if she is represented as a powerful female figure in Flanagan's view.

=== Sex symbol ===
Contemporary video game publications like Brazilian magazine SuperGamePower approved of Aya as a prominent example of a physical attractive female character from the 1990s. While Aya's appearance in the first Parasite Eve was lauded as a tasteful depiction of a female video game character by GamesRadar staff, the publication also highlighted the character's "inevitable objectification" in a 2009 article: they found that a majority of the official promotional art for the series portrayed her in sensual positions and with "increasingly less clothing". In Parasite Eve 2, Aya wears a miniskirt as opposed to a pair of jeans she wore in the first game, even during combat scenarios. Gudmundson expressed displeasure at the change and claimed that Aya had been reduced into a "machine-gun toting over-sexualized stereotypical caricature of a woman, complete with shower scene" for the sequel.

Aya Brea's character design and destructible clothing mechanic in The 3rd Birthday has received criticism for gratuitous erotica.

Aya's looks and sexuality became the focus of discussion during the marketing campaign of The 3rd Birthday and following its subsequent release. Multiple sources such as Destructoid, UGO, Gadżetomania, FHM and Tom's Guide have published articles which approved of her redesign and more sexualized portrayal compared to previous appearances. Complex published multiple articles which discuss the character's physically attractive qualities. In 2012, Polish console gaming magazine PSX Extreme conferred Aya the title of "Miss of Video Games".

Conversely, Aya's clothing and its associated destruction mechanic in The 3rd Birthday confounded many video game journalists in the West. Gudmundson objected to the implementation of Aya's destructible clothing which may expose of one of her butt cheeks, which she called "cringe-worthy", as well as her apparent change in personality into a "mindless yes-woman taking orders without question". Gudmundson emphasized that gratuitous fan service has its place if that is the foundation on which the series is built on, whereas Aya is a pre-established character who had undergone drastic change into a portrayal she considered to be "disrespectful and crass". Anthony John Agnello from The A.V. Club said Aya looks like she bought a "slutty" costume, patterned after Chrissie Hynde, which is repeatedly ripped off her body for no other reason than to show off more skin. In an otherwise positive review of The 3rd Birthday, 1Up's Jeremy Parish remarked that while Aya's redesigned presentation was an industry standard for female video game characters at the time it was released, the clothing mechanism is one aspect that he felt "panders shamelessly to the base corners of its audience" and agreed that her overall presentation was disrespectful to longtime fans of the Parasite Eve series. Brian Ashcraft from Kotaku and feminist media critic Anita Sarkeesian are also in agreement that Aya's alternate costumes are embarrassing and hypersexualized.

Aya's shower scene in The 3rd Birthday, which was not originally planned for inclusion, was also noted for its fan service nature. Critics said its inclusion was the direct result of the developers giving into demand from fans. Conrad Zimmerman from Destructoid mocked its inclusion and suggested that the pressure came from the internet blogging community in Japan, while Logan Westbrook from The Escapist described the shower scene to be "shoehorned" for the sole purpose of pandering to adult erotica enthusiasts, indicated by the game being pushed into a stricter rating bracket in Japan.

== See also ==
- List of fictional police detectives
