= Parasite Eve II =

1999 video game

- North American cover art
- Developer: Square
- Publishers: JP: Square; NA: Square Electronic Arts; EU: Square Europe
- Director: Kenichi Iwao
- Producer: Yusuke Hirata
- Artists: Tetsuya Nomura; Fumi Nakashima
- Writer: Kenichi Iwao
- Composer: Naoshi Mizuta
- Series: Parasite Eve
- Platform: PlayStation
- Release: JP: December 16, 1999; EU: August 25, 2000; NA: September 12, 2000
- Genres: Action role-playing, survival horror
- Mode: Single-player

Parasite Eve II (Note: Japanese: パラサイト・イヴ2, Hepburn: Parasaito Ivu Tsū) is a 1999 action role-playing game released for the PlayStation. The game was developed and published by Square, published in Japan in 1999 and in both North America and, unlike the previous game, in PAL regions in 2000. It is the sequel to Parasite Eve and the second game in the series of the same name.

Parasite Eve II is set three years after the events in the original game. The protagonist from the first game, Aya Brea, also features in this game as the playable character. She becomes involved with another outbreak of Neo-Mitochondrial creatures. Gameplay diverges from the previous game: battles take place in real time and the area of action is less restrictive. The approach is more typical of traditional survival horror games, although some role-playing elements are retained. The title was written and directed by Kenichi Iwao, who wrote Resident Evil (1996).

The game was well received by critics, although it was criticized for using a control system that was seen as being outdated.

== Gameplay ==
Parasite Eve II is an action role-playing survival horror video game. It uses tank controls: Aya is able to move forwards, backwards, and pivot left and right. Camera movement is limited, generally being confined to a single view of a room or area, and cannot be altered by the player.

Unlike Parasite Eve, there is no Active Time Bar that governs the order of actions during a battle. Battles take place in real time, so the player is free to act as they see fit. Another contrast is the absence of the 'range dome' seen in the first game, allowing the player to shoot at off-screen targets and engage targets from a safe distance. There are also no random battles; enemies will be found wandering in plain view, hence allowing the player to avoid confrontations and plan strategies. Aiming, as with most other games of this genre, is accomplished by cycling through the various 'lockable' targets within Aya's range.

Having locked her abilities gained in the original game, players have to "rediscover" abilities available with Aya's parasite energy (PE). This is done by using EXP gained from defeating enemies. However, whereas the first game used a levelling up system, in which abilities are unlocked at certain levels, the sequel allows players to choose freely which abilities they want to prioritise. These are categorised into 4 elements and can be summarised as follows: fire for offensive abilities, water for health-related abilities, wind for status-related abilities, earth for abilities that affect damage stats (given or taken). There are 3 abilities in each element category, and each ability has three tiers (level 1, 2 and 3), with level 3 being the most powerful and costing the least MP.

There are 48 enemy variations in Parasite Eve II’s ‘bounty roster’, each having their own unique attacks, strengths, and weaknesses. Thirteen of these enemies are bosses, dealing more damage and having higher health totals than the rest of the roster.

Equipment can be obtained through various methods, including finding, purchasing and 'creating' items such as body armor, weapons, ammunition and tools. Many items fulfill two roles. The player has the option to either utilize them directly from their inventory or attach them to Aya's armor. To figure out both of the effects these items can have, players are advised to consult the game’s ‘items’ page for a detailed overview. Unlike most other survival horror games, ammunition is almost never in short supply. While Aya can only carry limited amounts of equipment with her, inexhaustible ammunition boxes exist in most areas and can be revisited as often as required for a top-up. This encourages the player to fight rather than run, which is essential to the gameplay as it is the only way to gain experience and thus for Aya to become powerful enough to succeed. While equipment follows the original game's concept of being customizable, in general the weapons and armor are quite limited in the alterations available. Armor, which not only reduces damage but also affects the amount Aya can carry, has the option of adding extra item slots up to a limit of ten.

Once the game has been completed, bonus items become available for the player should they choose to redo the game in Replay mode. After playing through the game, players are awarded a ranking based on the total amount of EXP they've accumulated. The ranking received will add 3 new items to the shop list available in Replay mode, the items depend on the ranking, with higher ranks yielding better items. Other modes also become available, such as Bounty Hunter and Scavenger which are more difficult for the player to complete. The most difficult mode "Nightmare" only becomes available after completing the game in Scavenger Mode.

== Plot ==
In September 2000, nearly three years after the events of the first game, Aya Brea, now an FBI operative working in the clandestine Mitochondrial Investigation and Suppression Team (MIST) department; is dispatched to the Akropolis Tower shopping mall in Los Angeles as back up the LAPD SWAT team in response to reports of Neo-Mitochondrial Creatures (NMC) sightings. As Aya and her partner Rupert Broderick investigate the tower they discover a new form of NMC with the power to pass as human which was able to slaughter the first SWAT team responders. As Aya works to exterminate the NMCs she discovers the building is wired to explode and encounters No. 9, a psychopathic NMC / GOLEM who injures Rupert. Aya fends off No. 9 but barely escapes with Rupert when No. 9 triggers the detonators on the building.

Following the raid Aya is sent by MIST director Eric "Hal" Baldwin to investigate the desert town of Dryfield, Nevada, over reports of unusual animals. While initially displeased with the assignment, Aya learns from MIST's technical expert Pierce Carradine that an implant recovered from one of the new NMCs has desert sand unique to that area of Nevada near Dryfield. Aya arrives to find the tiny town overrun with NMCs and makes contact with Gary Douglas, a survivalist and gun enthusiast who is the sole remaining inhabitant of the town, his dog, Flint, and Kyle Madigan, a private investigator who claims he is on a mission similar to Aya's. He tells her about "The Shelter", a nearby underground facility that may hold the answers to the recent outbreak of NMCs.

After spending some time in Dryfield and having another run-in with No. 9, Aya and Kyle are able to reach an entrance into the Shelter within an abandoned mine. As Aya explores the Shelter which has become overrun with NMCs she discovers numerous scientific facilities and learns that the Shelter was created to enact the "Second Neoteny Plan", a project to deliberately create Artificial Neo-Mitochondrial Creatures (ANMCs, the new humanoid creatures) in the belief that they are superior to humanity. Aya also learns that the mutant mitochondria the ANMCs were created with is actually her own, and with the aid of Pierce learns that the Shelter acquired her genetic material directly from Baldwin and MIST, which has secret ties to the conspiracy that founded the Shelter. She also learns that the Second Neoteny Plan is nearing its culmination with a massive cocoon containing an ANMC that, when fully grown, will be able to generate a vector virus that will transform the entire human race into ANMCs.

Haunted by visions of a mysterious girl and seeking to put an end to the threat from the Shelter, Aya progresses into the Neo Ark (Note: Japanese: シャンバラ, "Shambala"), a zoo-like artificial construction hidden deep in the Shelter. Originally intended to be a showcase of ANMCs with multiple different habitats and viewing platforms, Neo Ark was ground zero for the outbreak of creatures and has also been overrun by various kinds of NMCs. Aya is able to disable the two organic power generators to reach the depths of the Shelter, and finds the mystery girl. After defeating her ANMC guardian, Aya is able to discover that the girl, Eve, was cloned from Aya's genetic material to be the final key to the Second Neoteny Plan. As Aya, Eve, and Kyle make their way to escape from the Shelter they're ambushed by No. 9 who is able to kidnap Eve.

Chasing No. 9, Aya encounters a small army of his mindless GOLEMs, the Shelter's force of genetically enhanced cyborg "hunters", but is rescued by the US Marines, who have been alerted by Aya's contacts at MIST and learns that Douglas has been evacuated and that Dryfield has been sealed off. Aya fights her way back into the Shelter to rescue Eve and finds her at the ANMC cocoon along with No. 9 and Kyle, who seems to be working with him. No. 9 attempts to use Eve to hatch the monstrous ANMC when Kyle betrays him, revealing he was a double agent sent to infiltrate the Shelter's conspiracy, and allows No. 9 to be eaten by the ANMC cocoon. At the same time, to contain the threat of the NMCs, the US President orders the use of a Satellite Weapon to destroy Dryfield and the Shelter, prematurely hatching the ANMC. Aya fatally injures the final ANMC, but it is able to devour Eve creating a new form of the monstrous Mitochondria Eve. Aya is able to destroy this new incarnation of Mitochondria Eve and manages to rescue Eve, putting an end to the Second Neoteny Plan for good. However, Kyle vanishes after the battle.

In the aftermath Aya adopts Eve as her younger sister, Rupert takes over as leader of MIST after purging the corrupt elements of the organization, and Pierce begins work on a plan to reveal the existence of Neo-Mitochondria to the public. One year later, Aya and Eve travel to the Natural History Museum in New York where she reunites with Kyle.

== Development ==
Development of Parasite Eve II was handled by Square, developers of the original Parasite Eve. The game was directed and written by Kenichi Iwao, who had previously worked in those roles for the 1996 survival horror game Resident Evil. Due to its popularity at the time, Square decided to design a new Parasite Eve game which emulated that style. The game was originally intended to be a spin-off of the first game with Kyle as the main protagonist; this was the main reason for the shift in genre and gameplay. During development, it was decided to turn the game into an official sequel to Parasite Eve, making Aya the main protagonist and removing Kyle as a playable character. Production was handled by an entirely new development team based in Osaka. The staff included several former Resident Evil staff members. Using feedback from the original game, the team decreased and smoothed the transition between exploration and battle, and adjusted the controls to be more user-friendly. The character of Aya had been created for Parasite Eve by the producer Hironobu Sakaguchi, and designed by artist Tetsuya Nomura. Her design in Parasite Eve II was handled by a different artist, using her original design as a template. While most of the design was finalized, the new designer had quit halfway through the game's development, and Nomura was called in again. As the in-game model had already been created, he preserved what had already been done while adding touches of his own.

After the game was done, the team was merged with those behind Brave Fencer Musashi, Mana and Chrono Cross to make Final Fantasy XI.

=== Music ===
The score for Parasite Eve II was composed by Naoshi Mizuta, serving as his first work at Square after leaving Capcom in 1998. It took Mizuta a year and a half to compose the soundtrack. He states he was given quite a bit of freedom in his composition, and drew most of his influence from watching the game's already completed scenario. The game's music is depicted as being much more ambient than its predecessor. The sound effects of Parasite Eve II were influenced by futuristic and sci-fi themes. The 66-track two-disc Parasite Eve II Original Soundtrack was released by DigiCube on December 20, 1999, in Japan. The soundtrack was released in North America by Tokyopop on September 12, 2000.

== Release ==
Parasite Eve II was released in Japan on December 16, 1999. It was released in North America on September 12, 2000, and in Europe on August 25, 2000. The game sold over 220,000 copies in Japan during 1999. It shipped 1.09 million copies by February 2004, with 0.43 million sold in Japan and 0.66 million sold in the rest of the world. In late 2000, the game was re-released as part of the Square Millennium Collection along with a figure of Aya and a portrait of her character model, Yumiko Shaku. The game was re-released as part of the PSone Books best-seller line by Sony in Japan in 2002.

In early September 2010, posts made on Twitter in relation to the spin-off title The 3rd Birthday suggested that Parasite Eve 1 and 2 would be added to the PlayStation Network's game download service. On October 28 these rumors were proven to be correct, with Parasite Eve being given a November 4 release date and Parasite Eve 2 arriving on the PlayStation Network in Japan on November 24. Parasite Eve II was released on the North American PlayStation Network on August 23, 2011.

== Reception ==
Reception

Aggregate scores
Aggregator	Score
GameRankings	78%
Metacritic	79/100

Review scores
Publication	Score
AllGame	2.5/5
Edge	4/10
Famitsu	30/40
GamePro	4/5
GameRevolution	B−
GameSpot	7.3/10
IGN	6.9/10
Next Generation	4/5
Official U.S. PlayStation Magazine	4.5/5
Play	89%

Parasite Eve II received "generally favorable" reviews, according to review aggregator website Metacritic.

Greg Orlando reviewed the PlayStation version of the game for Next Generation, rating it four stars out of five, and stated that "Square seems to have taken to heart most of the criticism from the original. Eve II is scary good fun."
