= Parasite Eve (video game) =

1998 video game

- North American packaging artwork
- Developer: Square
- Publishers: JP: Square; NA: Square Electronic Arts
- Director: Takashi Tokita
- Producer: Hironobu Sakaguchi
- Designer: Yoshihiko Maekawa
- Programmer: Hiroshi Kawai
- Artist: Tetsuya Nomura
- Writers: Hideaki Sena; Takashi Tokita
- Composer: Yoko Shimomura
- Series: Parasite Eve
- Platform: PlayStation
- Release: JP: March 29, 1998; NA: September 10, 1998
- Genre: Role-playing
- Mode: Single-player

Parasite Eve is a 1998 role-playing video game developed and published by Square. The game is a sequel to the novel Parasite Eve, written by Hideaki Sena; it is the first game in the Parasite Eve video game series. The story follows New York City police officer Aya Brea over a six-day span in 1997 as she attempts to stop Eve, a woman who plans to destroy the human race through spontaneous human combustion. Players explore levels set in areas of New York while utilizing a pausable real-time combat system along with several role-playing elements.

Parasite Eve was SquareSoft's first M-rated game, and the first major American and Japanese game development collaboration for the company. It was produced by Hironobu Sakaguchi and directed by Takashi Tokita. Music for the title was composed by Yoko Shimomura who was widely acclaimed for her work to create an "inorganic" and "emotionless" soundtrack that saw two album releases. Parasite Eve received positive reviews; critics praised the graphics and gameplay, but found the overall game too linear and with little replay potential.

The video game adaptation was part of a resurgence of popularity in Japanese horror sparked by the original book, and was released alongside a film adaptation and two manga comics; one based on the book, the other on the video game. The original title was followed by two video game sequels: Parasite Eve II in 1999 and The 3rd Birthday in 2010, and was re-released on the PlayStation Network in 2010. The first two games, Parasite Eve and Parasite Eve II, had shipped over 3 million copies worldwide by 2010.

== Gameplay ==
Like other role-playing video games made by Square for the PlayStation, Parasite Eve was made during a period that Peter Tieryas of Kotaku described as an "experimental period" where nearly every role-playing video game from the company had unique combat mechanics. Contemporary reviews from GameSpot and Official U.S. PlayStation Magazine described the game as a hybrid of Final Fantasy VII and Resident Evil. Parasite Eve's game's director, Takashi Tokita, described the game's style as a "cinematic RPG", with its look and feel strongly alluding to an interactive movie-like experience.

Movement in the "world map" (which is a map of Manhattan) is limited to specific destinations. Upon the player walking over a "hot spot", there's a chance of a random encounter. Enemies materialize and attack players on the same screen that they move Aya around on, with no battle mode or screen being used. In battle, the game uses a pausable real-time combat system with an Active Time Bar (ATB) that sets the amount of time that has to elapse until the player can take their next action. While waiting for her turn, the player character Aya can be moved around to dodge enemy attacks. Upon each turn, the player may choose between attacking with their equipped weapon by pressing the attack button, using Parasite Energy (PE) for defense, assistance, or attack, using items, changing a weapon or armor, or escaping the battle. If the player chooses to attack, the battle briefly pauses and a dome/sphere symbolizing the range of the weapon appears, allowing the player to target an enemy within range. PE recharges during battle but the more players use it, the slower it refills.

When not in battle, the player has the option of altering the weapon and armor attributes and effects with tools and super-tools, which are limited in number. The player selects the "tune-up" option, choosing the weapon that will be altered and the weapon from which the attributes or effect will be taken. Weapons have many different properties, including special effects like "acid", which causes enemies to continuously take damage. One of the principal role-playing elements of the game is that experience-based levels are present. Each time the player's level increases, their attributes go up and Bonus Points (BP) are given. These points can be distributed to the ATB, item capacity, or attributes of a weapon or armor.

Once the game is completed, a new game plus mode is available called "EX game". It is different from normal play in various aspects; the player has access to every item stored in the police station, the game begins with the final weapon and armor the player chose before ending the first game but returns to level one experience, and the bonus points (BP) given to the player at the end of the game are now available to use. The items, weapons and power-ups are more powerful, as are the enemies the player encounters. However, the biggest difference from the normal game is the addition of the Chrysler Building, a new location with 77 floors (containing mostly randomized content), leading to a final boss battle with Aya's older sister, Maya.

== Plot ==
Critics highlighted the shocking opening scene where people in the audience spontaneously combust.

Aya Brea, an NYPD rookie, attends an opera at Carnegie Hall with a date in New York City on December 24th, 1997. During the performance, a catastrophic incident occurs in which many audience members spontaneously combust, while others panic and flee the building. Aya, her date, and the lead actress on stage, Melissa Pearce, are among the survivors. Aya confronts Melissa onstage, and Melissa says that Aya's mitochondria need more time to develop. She flees backstage, with Aya giving chase. Backstage, Melissa then mutates into a beast and flees into the sewers, declaring that her name is now Eve.

The next day, on December 25th, Aya and her partner, Daniel Dollis, go to see a scientist at the Museum of Natural History named Dr. Hans Klamp. He teaches them about mitochondria, but they do not find his information useful since it does not explain the previous night's events. Later that day, they hear that Eve is in Central Park, and to make matters worse, an audience has gathered at the park's theater intending to see a performance that Melissa Pearce was to give. Aya enters Central Park alone as Daniel is unable to pass through the entrance without spontaneously combusting. She makes it to the theater, but is too late to stop Eve, who causes the theater audience's mitochondria to rebel against their hosts and turns the crowd into a slimy orange mass. Aya chases after Eve and is knocked unconscious after a fight with her aboard a horse-drawn carriage. Daniel discovers that his son, Ben, was at the park, but had left the audience at the Central Park theater when he began to feel ill and when his mother began to act strange. He also learns that Manhattan is being evacuated due to the threat that Eve poses.

While Manhattan is being evacuated, a Japanese scientist named Kunihiko Maeda manages to sneak into the city, witnessing a police officer combust into flames in the process. Aya awakens in an apartment in SoHo, with Daniel and Maeda at her side. Maeda reveals the origins of Eve: A scientist tried to culture the cells of his wife after she was involved in a car accident, and the mitochondria in her cells took over her body. Maeda believes that Eve may be trying to give birth to an "Ultimate Being". The next day, the three go to see Dr. Klamp again. After examining cell samples from that of Eve and Aya's, Maeda concludes that based on selfish gene theory, Aya and Eve's mitochondria are in an evolutionary race for survival. Dr. Klamp suddenly appears and asks a few questions of Aya in a hostile manner. The three leave and head for the St. Francis Hospital, where Maeda thinks Eve may try to get sperm for the Ultimate Being. When they arrive, they find that Eve is already there. Eve takes the sperm and escapes.

The next day, Aya sees the orange mass of people from the park enter the city water supply. She goes to Dr. Klamp one more time, and discovers that Dr. Klamp has engineered special sperm for Eve so that she can create the Ultimate Being. He then spontaneously combusts. Aya finds Eve in another part of the museum, where the orange mass has surrounded her, forming an impermeable shield to protect her while the Ultimate Being gestates within her. After several failed attempts to attack Eve, the military asks Aya to attack her from a chopper, as she is the only one who can get close without combusting. The plan works, but Aya has to personally finish the fight on a now-wrecked Statue of Liberty, where Eve finally succumbs to necrosis due to her unstable cells. As Aya rests on a naval vessel, the Ultimate Being is born and attacks the surrounding ships. Aya does battle with the Ultimate Being, but its mitochondria cause it to evolve at an alarming rate. Aya sets the vessel's boiler pressure dangerously high, so as to destroy it with the Ultimate Being on board. Aya, Daniel, his son Ben, and Maeda attend Carnegie Hall, where Aya's mitochondrial powers allow her to resonate with the audience members, their eyes ominously glowing.

=== "EX game" ===
Aya notices an odd glow coming from the Chrysler Building, leading her to find the original Eve, who takes the form of Aya's sister, Maya. She explains that after a car crash injured Aya and killed Maya and their mother, Klamp gave Maya's cornea and kidneys to Aya and Melissa respectively, giving them both mitochondria, and he cultivated the liver cells of the original Eve to analyze. When Melissa was giving birth to the Ultimate Being, she created a nest there. In case Melissa and the Ultimate Being failed, the purebred would remain. Aya speaks with her sister for a while but Eve soon takes over and they both engage in battle. After the purebred is defeated, the mitochondria inside Aya's body begin to rebel against her. It is explained that Aya's mitochondria have now reached a higher evolutionary stage than Maya's, but Maya's personality has suddenly become dominant and begun to fight off the Eve persona. Maya eventually wins, purging the Eve persona from herself, and protects Aya by preventing the original Eve from taking over her. Aya leaves the building after telling Maya to return home together.

== Development ==
The video game Parasite Eve is based on the Japanese novel Parasite Eve released in 1995. Plot-wise, the video game serves as a sequel to the book, referencing various events therein while also stating that Mariko Anzai, the girl whom Eve had chosen to become her host in the novel, is Aya's biological mother. The game was produced by Hironobu Sakaguchi and directed by Takashi Tokita of Square. Development lasted roughly two years, including the pre-planning phase. Sakaguchi created the story outline, not watching any movies so he would not be influenced by them. During the first six months of production, the game was to be set in Tokyo and act as a more direct sequel to the novel, but Sakaguchi suggested setting the game in New York City.

The game was built on a modified version of the Final Fantasy VII game engine. In contrast to previous Square titles, the development team for Parasite Eve consisted of both Japanese and American staff members, with a large part of the production taking place in the United States. An additional team of thirty were based in Square's Hawaii studio. U.S. artists Steve Gray and Darnell Williams were in charge of most of the CG work. Different concepts for the game's opening were considered, including different designs for Aya and Melissa transforming into Eve on stage during the opera. Book author Hideaki Sena did not know the title's plot until it was completed, since the game was a collaboration between Square and his publisher.

Aya Brea was created by Hironobu Sakaguchi and designed by Tetsuya Nomura. Aya was originally being designed by someone else, but the original sketches did not satisfy Sakaguchi, who had wanted a long-haired character like Aerith Gainsborough, a central character from Final Fantasy VII. At the time, he was creating another unspecified character for a different project who sported short hair: he got confused while designing them and accidentally combined the two designs, creating the then-current Aya. The original concept for her was to have her as strong, sexy and "bewitching". Her name was taken from Sakaguchi's daughter Aya. The names "Daniel" and "Maeda" were taken from members of staff.

A video demo of Parasite Eve was displayed at the September 1997 Tokyo Game Show, consisting of full motion video with no gameplay footage.

== Release ==
Parasite Eve was released on March 29, 1998 in Japan for the PlayStation. Television ads featuring the full motion video present in the game were aired in the United States in the run-up to the game's 1998 release. In a shipping mixup, over two hundred copies of the game were shipped to Best Buy retailers a week before release. Parasite Eve was Square's first game to be rated Mature by the ESRB and the first to be released under the Square Electronic Arts joint-venture. The game was released in North America on September 10, 1998.

Before The 3rd Birthday's release in 2010, both Yoshinori Kitase and Tetsuya Nomura discussed the re-release of Parasite Eve and Parasite Eve II. The release was being held up partly due to the series rights being co-owned with Hideaki Sena. The game was later released in both Japan and North America on the PlayStation Network in 2010 and 2011, respectively. In 2018, the game was included in the Japanese lineup of the PlayStation Classic.

== Music ==
Parasite Eve Original Soundtrack

Soundtrack album by Yoko Shimomura
- Released: May 21, 1998
- Recorded: Andora Studios, Los Angeles
- Length: 1:46:55
- Label: DigiCube
- Producer: Square Enix

Yoko Shimomura composed the game's soundtrack including the main theme, "Primal Eyes". The ending vocal song, "Somnia Memorias", is performed by Shani Rigsbee. The score met with great critical acclaim, using influences from both opera and electronica. Shimomura stated that she tried to compose "inorganic" music for the game, what she described as "something unique" for the game. A separate Parasite Eve Remixes album was also released, containing 10 tracks remixed from the original game by various artists. The idea for the work came from a simple suggestion to Shimomura that the game's music be remixed rather than rearranged. "Somnia Memorias" was also included on the Square Vocal Collection in 2001.

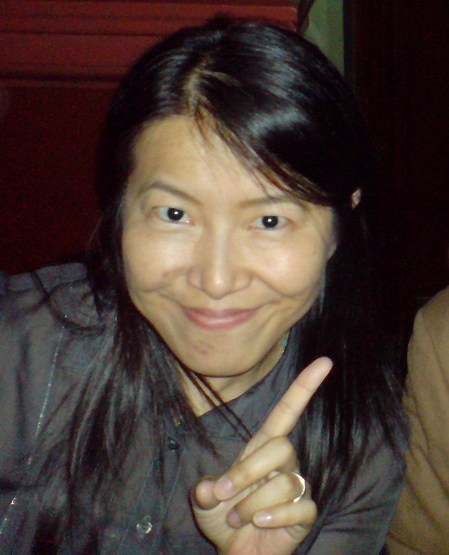
Yoko Shimomura, composer for Parasite Eve, in 2007

Yoko Shimomura would later become a well-established video game composer through her work on the Kingdom Hearts series. Additional arrangements were done by Shigeo Tamaru. Despite her previous work as lead composer on Super Mario RPG, Parasite Eve became her breakout project and garnered her international fame. During her work on Parasite Eve, Shimomura spent time in America, which was where much of the game's staff came from. Because of this, Shimomura remembered the game as her most challenging project. She wanted the music to be experimental, not falling into ambient or techno classifications. One of her main goals was to create something "inorganic" and recognizable as a product of Square. Until Parasite Eve, Shimomura had written music in a straightforward manner that reflected her then-current state of mind, but this time she restrained herself and took a more "emotionless" approach. She felt that this would best represent the game's atmosphere and Aya's stoic attitude. Ultimately, she felt that Parasite Eve was an experimental work in many ways. Due to its prevalence in the story, Shimomura used opera music, but as typical opera music did not translate well into battle themes, Shimomura added different rhythms: these rhythms were inspired when some of the game's American staff took her to a nightclub and she heard the background music there. The music recording took place at the Andora Studios in Los Angeles.

Parasite Eve was the first of her projects to include a vocal theme, the ending theme "Somnia Memorias". This was because the PlayStation system was the first to have sufficient processing power for this to be possible. For the vocalist, Shimomura avoided using someone well known. "Somnia Memorias" was sung by Shani Rigsbee, while the vocals for the orchestrated versions of "Influence of Deep" and "Se il Mio Amore Sta Vincino" were provided by Judith Siirila. "Somnia Memorias" was translated and adapted from Japanese into Latin by Raul Ferrando, while "Se il Mio Amore Sta Vincino" was translated by Daniella Spagnolo. The lyrics for all vocal pieces were written by Shimomura. The track "I Hear a Voice Asking Me to Awaken" was an arrangement of Wachet auf, ruft uns die Stimme, BWV 140 by Johann Sebastian Bach.

The two-disc album Parasite Eve Original Soundtrack was released through DigiCube on May 21, 1998 under the catalog number SSCX-10020. Later, due to popular demand from fans, a reprint was issued through the Square Enix label on January 26, 2011 under the catalog number SQEX-10222/3. The music received generally positive reviews from music critics, and helped establish Shimomura as a popular composer with western video game fans.

Parasite Eve Remixes is a ten-track album, featuring remixed versions of themes from Parasite Eve. The remixes were done by Shimomura, Tamaru, Hidenori Iwasaki and Keichi Takahashi. Multiple DJs also contributed, including Tomo, QUADRA, Dan K, Tribal Masters, Kay Nakayama, and Dummy Run. According to Shimomura, the album came about when someone suggested to her creating full remixes of themes rather than making simple rearrangements. Shimomura was in charge of extending and remixing "Aya's Theme", which was the main theme for Parasite Eve. The album was released through DigiCube on July 30, 1998 under the catalog number SSCX-10023. Reviews of the album were mixed, with critics saying that it would not appeal to many and finding some of the remixes odd, repetitive or overly chaotic.

== Reception ==
Reception

Aggregate scores
| Aggregator | Score |
|---|---|
| GameRankings | 77% |
| Metacritic | 81/100 |

Review scores
| Publication | Score |
|---|---|
| Computer and Video Games | 3/5 |
| Edge | 6/10 |
| Electronic Gaming Monthly | 7.83/10 |
| Famitsu | 33/40 |
| Game Informer | 7.75/10 |
| GamePro | 4.5/5 |
| GameRevolution | B |
| GameSpot | 7.2/10 |
| IGN | 7.4/10 |
| Next Generation | 3/5 |
| Official U.S. PlayStation Magazine | 4/5 |
| PlayStation: The Official Magazine | 3/5 |
| RPGamer | 6/10 (Jake Alley); 8/10 (Stewart Bishop) |
| RPGFan | 88% |

According to Weekly Famitsu, 956,461 units of Parasite Eve were sold in Japan during the first half of 1998, which made it the country's third-best-selling game for the period. The game had shipped 1.94 million copies as of February 2004, with 1.05 million in Japan and 0.89 million in the rest of the world. In Japan, it was the 6th-top-selling game of 1998 with 994,000 copies sold. In its first month of release in the United States, it was the third best-selling home console game (behind Madden NFL 99 and NFL GameDay 99). The game was re-released in North America under Sony's Greatest Hits label.

Parasite Eve received "generally favorable" reviews, according to review aggregator Metacritic. IGN praised the game for its beautiful graphics and cinematic sequences, as well as its mature tone, but noted, along with other reviewers, the game's linear plot structure. Game Informer cited the games "exquisite" backdrops but bemoaned its long load times each time players enter a new environment or engage an enemy. GameSpot said the game had a cinematic look, and had an "astounding" level of detail for real-life locations in New York City. The lack of any voice acting or singing, however, hindered dramatic scenes such as the opera and subsequent mass combustion of the entire audience at the game's start.

The game was sometimes compared to the Resident Evil series, though GamePro said that Parasite Eve had deeper gameplay with multiple weapon upgrades and hidden areas to discover. Reviewers also cited that though the game broke many RPG gaming conventions, it suffered from having little replay value and being a relatively short game. The combat was compared unfavorably to Final Fantasy VII by Game Revolution, which featured a dynamic camera instead of fixed one. The novel's original author Hideaki Sena approved of the game, stating that he was "actually impressed how well the game makers translated the novel."

The Academy of Interactive Arts & Sciences named Parasite Eve as a finalist for the "Console Game of the Year", "Console Action Game of the Year" and "Console Role-Playing Game of the Year" categories during the 2nd Annual Interactive Achievement Awards.

In 2000, the game was ranked number 16 by the readers of Famitsu magazine in its top 100 PlayStation games of all time. In 2010, GamesRadar chose it as one of the "Top 7... '90s games that need HD remakes". In February 2011, Parasite Eve was announced to arrive on the North American PlayStation Network. It was released on March 15, 2011.

== Legacy ==
The Parasite Eve video game was inspired by a popular Japanese original book, and was a part of the "J-horror" phenomena along with other fiction such as Ring, and led to two video game sequels and a manga adaptation based upon the video game universe called Parasite Eve DIVA.

== Future ==
The 3rd Birthday executive producer and Square Enix executive Shinji Hashimoto revealed in 2017 that it was up to Tetsuya Nomura if the series would return.

In an interview conducted by the pro wrestler Kenny Omega with The 3rd Birthday producer and Square Enix executive Yoshinori Kitase in March 2020, Kenny asked if there's a potential for another PE game. Kitase replied by saying "I don't know of any plans right now, but it would be a waste not to use these characters".

== See also ==
- List of fictional portrayals of the NYPD
- List of Square Enix video game franchises
