= NaNa (band) =

Japanese musical duo

- Origin: Tokyo, Japan
- Genres: Downtempo, trip hop, alternative rock, experimental rock
- Years active: 1996–present
- Labels: Gutbounce, Gut/For Life Records, Warner Music Japan, One Dot Records
- Members: Chikako Watanabe; Shigeo Tamaru
- Website: www.song5.com

NaNa (Japanese ナナ) is a Japanese musical duo from Tokyo, Japan, consisting of Chikako Watanabe and Shigeo Tamaru . Their music draws on several influences including alternative rock, experimental rock, trip hop and downtempo.

== History ==
Watanabe (vocal) and Tamaru (guitar/producer) came together to form NaNa in 1996. NaNa's chief goal was to create high quality demo tapes that would showcase their music to the world market. In the summer of 1997, NaNa got an offer from Ryuichi Sakamoto to be on his Radio show, and they appeared on the program. This led NaNa into their debut from Sakamoto's label. NaNa's first EP topped the Indies chart including Tower Records in Tokyo. Afterward they released two albums and four EP from Gut/Forlife label and Warner Music Japan. In 2007, they started digital distribution on iTunes and Amazon. Then they have since increased the number of the listeners little by little in different countries. Starting in 2007, NaNa's tracks have gradually received air-play primarily in the UK and the US. As of 2010, their music came to be listened to all over the world via local and Satellite Radio, and BBC regardless of the type of Radio station.

== Discography ==
=== Albums ===
- Void (1999, Gut)
- Imaginary Man (2002, Warner Music Japan)
- "Imaginary Man (Bonus Track Version)" (2013, Warner Music Japan)

=== EPs ===
- Red (1998, Gutbounce)
- "S" (2000, Dream Machine/Warner Music Japan)
- "Remember Me" (2016, Warner Music Japan)

=== Singles ===
- "Super Star" (1998, Gut)
- "Snake Girl" (1999, Gut)
- "Ride" (2012, One Dot Records)
- "Unbelievable World" (2013, Warner Music Japan)

== Chart performance ==
In 2011, NaNa was ranked on Billboard's Uncharted, peaking to 12th place. In December 2011, they ranked No. 41 place on the Billboard's "The Best of 2011" (Year-End Chart, USA).
