= Hideaki Sena =

Japanese pharmacologist and novelist

- 瀬名 秀明
- Born: January 17, 1968 (age 58); Shizuoka City, Shizuoka Prefecture, Japan
- Occupations: Pharmacologist, novelist
- Known for: Parasite Eve

Hideaki Sena, Ph.D. (瀬名 秀明, Sena Hideaki; born January 17, 1968 in Shizuoka City) is a Japanese pharmacologist and novelist. Sena was a graduate student at Tohoku University when he wrote his prizewinning debut novel, Parasite Eve.

== Writing career ==
His most famous novel, Parasite Eve, was adapted into a film directed by Masayuki Ochiai in 1997 and a popular horror role-playing video game by Square. When Parasite Eve was adapted as a video game, Hideaki Sena did not learn the title's plot until it was completed, since the game was a collaboration between Square and his publisher. He is also the author of Brain Valley, for which he won the Nihon SF Taisho Award, and Tomorrow's Robots.

== Personal life ==
Dr. Sena currently lives in Sendai, Japan where he lectures on microbiology and genre fiction. Sena is a pen name, while the author's real name is Suzuki.

== Works ==
=== Novels ===
- パラサイト・イヴ Parasite Eve (Kadokawa Shoten, 1995 / Kadokawa Horror Bunko, 1996 / Shincho Bunko, 2007)
- BRAIN VALLEY (Kadokawa Shoten, 1997 / Kadokawa Bunko, 2000 / Shincho Bunko, 2005)
- 八月の博物館 Hachigatsu no Hakubutsukan (August Museum) (Kadokawa Shoten, 2000 / Kadokawa Bunko, 2003 / Shincho Bunko, 2006)
- デカルトの密室 Dekaruto no Misshitsu (Descartes's Locked Room) (Shinchosha, 2005)
- エヴリブレス Every Breath (Tokyo FM, 2008)
- 小説版ドラえもん のび太と鉄人兵団 Shōsetsuban Doraemon - Nobita to Tetsujin Heidan (Doraemon: Nobita and the Steel Troops) (Shogakukan, 2011)
- 大空のドロテ Ōzora no Dorote (Dorothée's Sky) (Futabasha, 2012). Published in 3 volumes between October and December 2012; further publication in 2 volumes in November 2015 by the same publisher.
- この青い空で君をつつもう Kono Aoi Sora de Kimi wo Tsutsumō (Let's Wrap You in This Blue Sky) (Futabasha, 2016)
- 魔法を召し上がれ Mahō wo Meshiagare (Enjoy My Magic) (Kodansha, 2019)
- 小説 ブラック・ジャック Shōsetsu Burakku Jakku (Black Jack) (Seibundo Seikosha, 2019). Original novel based on the manga series.

=== Novellas ===
- 虹の天象儀 Niji no Tenshōgi (The Rainbow Planetarium) (Shodensha, 2001) (Astronomic Museum, Goto Planetarium) Set in Tonichi Tenmonkan Astronomic Museum
- ゴッサマー・スカイ Gossamer Sky (e-novels, 2007)

=== Collections ===
- あしたのロボット Ashita no Robotto (Tomorrow's Robots) (Bungeishunju, 2002).
  - Re-published under the title ハル Hal (Bungeishunju, 2005).
- 第九の日 The Tragedy of Joy Daiku no Hi - The Tragedy of Joy (The 9th Day - The Tragedy of Joy) (Kobunsha, 2006)
- 希望 Kibō (Hope) (Hayakawa Shobo, 2011)
- 月と太陽 Tsuki to Taiyō (The Moon and The Sun) (Kodansha, 2013)
- 夜の虹彩 Yoru no Kōsai (The Iris of The Night) (Shuppan Geijutsusha, 2014)
- 新生 Shinsei (New Life) (Kawade Shobo Shinsha, 2014)

=== Anthologies edited ===
- ロボット・オペラ Robot Opera: An Anthology of Robot Fiction and Robot Culture (Kobunsha, 2004)

=== Nonfiction ===
- 小説と科学 文理を超えて創造する Shōsetsu to Kagaku - Bunri wo Koete Sōzō Suru (Novels & Science - Creation Surpassing the Science/Literature Boundary) (Iwanami Shoten, 1999).
  - Extended under the title ハートのタイムマシン！ 瀬名秀明の小説 / 理科倶楽部 Hāto no Taimu Mashin! Sena Hideaki no Shōsetsu / Rika Kurabu (The Heart's Time Machine! - A Novel by Hideaki Sena / Science Club) (Kadokawa Shoten, 2002)
- ロボット21世紀 Robotto Nijūisseiki (21st Century Robot) (Bungeishunju Bunshun New Works, 2001)
- おとぎの国の科学 Otogi no Kuni no Kagaku (Science in Wonderland) (Shobunsha, 2006)
- 瀬名秀明ロボット学論集 Sena Hideaki Robotto Gakuronshū (Hideaki Sena's Essays on Robots) (Keiso Shobo, 2008)
- 瀬名秀明解説全集+α Sena Hideaki Kaisetsu Zenshū Purasu Arufa (Hideaki Sena's Complete Commentaries + α) (e-novels, 2008)
- Computer Kakumei: Saikyou × Saisoku no Zunou Tanjou (2012)
