= Final Fantasy Grandmasters =

2015 video game

- App icon of iOS version
- Developer: CROOZ
- Publisher: Square Enix
- Series: Final Fantasy
- Platforms: iOS, Android
- Release: September 30, 2015
- Genre: MMORPG
- Modes: Single-player, multiplayer

Final Fantasy Grandmasters was a mobile MMORPG spin-off of Final Fantasy XI, developed by CROOZ and published by Square Enix. It saw a Japan-only release on September 30, 2015 for iOS and Android following a closed beta that summer. Part of the "Vana'diel Project", it was initially meant to be a tie-in with Rhapsodies of Vana'diel, at the time meant to be the final major scenario pack for FFXI, and a separate mobile remake of the original MMO called Final Fantasy XI R in development from Nexon, then scheduled for release in 2016. However, the remake became vaporware, with Grandmasters the only additional game to be released. It was shut down on April 25, 2019.

Taking place in the same fictional world of Vana'diel, the game involved players creating a character as a Hume (human) or one of four other fantasy races, Elvaan, Tarutaru, Mithra, and Galka, all depicted with chibi character models. The player traveled the world by airship in a quest to become the strongest "Grandmaster" adventurer. Meant to give a similar experience as the original game, players could select from a variety of jobs for their character, and engage in cooperative multiplayer battles against enemies, while communicating with other players using an in-game chat.

== Gameplay ==
The game allowed the player to create and customize a unique player character from one of five races, assigning them a job and equipment. From their home base, the player took quests to hunt monsters in dungeons, gaining experience points. Combat was turn-based, using an Active Time Battle (ATB) system that gradually recharged a player's action points and allowed them to trigger moves. Up to four players could join a battle in progress without affecting the experience gained. Text chat and emoticons could be used to communicate with other players and organize raids.

== Release ==
By January 2016, the game had surpassed two million downloads. In the same month, Square Enix planned an item giveaway for the subsequent week.

== Reception ==
In a preview, Romendil of Jeuxvideo.com rated the game 3/5 points, or "Average". They called one of the game's primary strengths and weaknesses its MMO-style design, causing players to be dependent on the goodwill of others to help them. They criticized a lack of variety with quests, noting they all revolved around hunting down specific monsters, and the "relatively deserted" environments. They summed up their judgement of the game as containing interesting ideas, but also being worryingly repetitive with its missions, stating that it would nevertheless be of interest to fans of the original game.

In a separate preview, Seiichiro Kawasaki of 4Gamer.net stated that he was not completely satisfied with the game compared to its original incarnation, but that it had a different form of fun. Saying that the game was easily accessible even for those who were not familiar with FFXI, he also praised how easy its party system was to use, the lack of an energy system to impede play, and its soundtrack. Chris Priestman of Pocket Gamer described Grandmasters as "cute" and expressed the hope that it would be released in the West, but Heath Hindman of GameRevolution had a less positive impression of the game, stating that it looked "stupid".
