= List of Final Fantasy media =

Franchise of video games and media

Final Fantasy is a series of role-playing video games developed and published by Square Enix (formerly Square). Its first game premiered in Japan in 1987, and Final Fantasy games have subsequently been localized for markets in North America, Europe and Australia, on nearly every video game console since its debut on the Nintendo Entertainment System. Final Fantasy is Square Enix's most successful franchise, having sold over 97 million units worldwide to date. In addition to traditional role-playing games, the series includes tactical role-playing games, portable games, massively multiplayer online role-playing games, and games for mobile phones. Its popularity has placed it as the tenth-best-selling video game franchise, and the series has won multiple awards over the years.

In addition to the 16 games released as part of the main (numbered) series and their many spin-offs and related titles, the Final Fantasy series has spawned many works in other media including anime, films, novels and manga, and radio dramas. Final Fantasy: Unlimited, originally a stand-alone anime series, now has its own sub-franchise which includes video games. Many games, particularly the main series, have soundtrack album releases featuring their music in different arrangements. Square Enix has also consistently released companion books for its games which provide additional backstory and plot information, as well as detailed walkthroughs for the game. Since the announcement of Compilation of Final Fantasy VII, Square Enix has focused on "polymorphic content", expanding each game world with material on many video game platforms, as well as other forms of media.

== Video games ==
Each game in the main series takes place in a different fictional universe, although beginning with Final Fantasy X-2, additional video games set in the main series games' worlds have been released. Compilation of Final Fantasy VII and Fabula Nova Crystallis Final Fantasy are cross-platform multimedia projects consisting of games, films, books, and other media centered on their respective main series game, Final Fantasy VII and XIII. Final Fantasy Tactics, although originally envisioned as a spin-off game, became its own series as part of Ivalice Alliance, which counts Final Fantasy XII in its membership.

A large number of spin-off video games have also been made for the Final Fantasy series. These spin-off games vary in their relation to the main series; the first, The Final Fantasy Legend games, were marketed as related in North America but were considered to be the first three games of the SaGa series in their native Japan, and later SaGa games released outside Japan bear no Final Fantasy branding. Dissidia Final Fantasy, on the other hand, is a fighting game using characters from the main series exclusively. Overall, more than 30 games have been released as spin-offs of the main Final Fantasy series, many within their own sub-series.

== Film and television ==
Square's initial forays into film and television were critical and commercial failures. Final Fantasy: Legend of the Crystals was poorly received and the box office failure of Final Fantasy: The Spirits Within lead to the merger between Square and Enix. The series did not have success in film until Final Fantasy VII: Advent Children, which ultimately won several awards for "best anime feature" and sold over 2.4 million copies within a year.

Title	Original release date		
Title	Japan	North America	PAL region
Final Fantasy: Legend of the Crystals	March 21, 1994	November 24, 1998	none
Notes: Four episode original video animation (OVA) by Madhouse.; Sequel to Final Fantasy V.
Final Fantasy: The Spirits Within	September 15, 2001	July 11, 2001	August 3, 2001
Notes: Feature-length, theatrically released computer-generated film released under the Final Fantasy brand.
Final Fantasy: Unlimited	October 2, 2001	October 28, 2003	March 15, 2004
Notes: Original 25 episode animated television series by GONZO featuring concepts and themes from the Final Fantasy games.
Final Fantasy VII: Advent Children	September 14, 2005	April 25, 2006	April 24, 2006
Notes: Feature-length, theatrically released computer-generated film serving as a sequel to Final Fantasy VII.; Part of the Compilation of Final Fantasy VII.; Last Order: Final Fantasy VII, a traditionally animated OVA by Madhouse that serves as a prequel to Final Fantasy VII, is included as a bonus feature on the North American Limited Edition Collector's Set of Advent Children.; A director's cut version of the film was released in 2009 on Blu-ray disc as Final Fantasy VII: Advent Children Complete. It includes On The Way To A Smile – Episode: Denzel, a traditionally animated OVA adaption of "Case of Denzel", the first story in the On the Way to a Smile short story collection.
Brotherhood: Final Fantasy XV	March 30, 2016	March 30, 2016	March 30, 2016
Notes: Original 5 episode animated television series by A-1 Pictures, that was released for free on the internet.; Focuses on the four main characters of Final Fantasy XV - Prince Noctis, Gladiolus, Prompto and Ignis - and establishes their backstory and how the latter three each met Prince Noctis.; Blu-ray version with a 6th bonus episode, focusing on Lunafreya, was included with the Ultimate Collector's Edition of Final Fantasy XV and with the Limited Edition of Kingsglaive: Final Fantasy XV.
Kingsglaive: Final Fantasy XV	July 9, 2016	August 17, 2016	October 4, 2016
Notes: Kingsglaive is based on the setting and story of the video game Final Fantasy XV, which is thematically connected to the Fabula Nova Crystallis subseries.; A prequel that focuses on Noctis' father and the Niflheim Invasion, leading directly into the events of the game.

== Radio drama ==
Despite its decline in the United States, radio drama has remained popular in Japan. The series features a small number of radio drama releases.

Title	Original release date		
Title	Japan	North America	PAL region
Final Fantasy Tactics Advance	February 26, 2003	none	none
Notes: Radio drama adaptation of Final Fantasy Tactics Advance.; Aired between January and February 2003.; Released in Japan by DigiCube on four CDs.
Final Fantasy: Unlimited Before	June 30, 2003	none	none
Notes: Radio drama detailing events prior to Final Fantasy: Unlimited.
Final Fantasy: Unlimited After 2	December 26, 2002	none	none
Notes: Radio drama that continues the story of the anime.

== Soundtracks ==
The primary composer of music for the main series was Nobuo Uematsu, who single-handedly composed the soundtracks for the first nine games, as well as directed the production of many of the albums. Music for the spin-off series and main series games beginning with Final Fantasy X was created by a variety of composers including Masashi Hamauzu, Naoshi Mizuta, Hitoshi Sakimoto, and Kumi Tanioka, as well as many others. In addition to the original soundtracks, listed below, many games have inspired orchestral, vocal, or piano arrangement albums, as well as compilation albums featuring music from several Final Fantasy games.

Title	Original release date		
Title	Japan	North America	PAL region
All Sounds of Final Fantasy I & II	December 21, 1988	none	none
Notes: One CD (62:33) with 49 tracks.; Released in Japan by DataM/Polystar.
Final Fantasy III Original Sound Version	July 15, 1991	none	none
Notes: One CD (54:24) with 44 tracks.; Released in Japan by Square and NTT Publishing.
Final Fantasy IV Original Sound Version	June 14, 1991	August 21, 2001	none
Notes: One CD (58:23) with 44 tracks.; Released in Japan by Square Co. and NTT Publishing.
Final Fantasy V Original Sound Version	December 7, 1992	none	none
Notes: Two CDs (2:08:30) with 67 tracks.; Released in Japan by Square Co. and NTT Publishing.
Final Fantasy VI Original Sound Version	March 25, 1994	July 1, 1994	none
Notes: Three CDs (3:07:21) with 61 tracks.; Released in Japan by NTT Publishing.
Final Fantasy VII Original Soundtrack	February 10, 1997	none	none
Notes: Four CDs (4:39:53) with 85 tracks.; Released in Japan by DigiCube.
Final Fantasy VIII Original Soundtrack	March 1, 1999	January 2000	none
Notes: Four CDs (4:09:30) with 74 tracks.; Released in Japan by DigiCube.
Final Fantasy IX Original Soundtrack	August 30, 2000	none	none
Notes: Four CDs (4:46:31) with 110 tracks.; Released in Japan by DigiCube.
Final Fantasy X Original Soundtrack	August 1, 2001	none	none
Notes: Four CDs (4:32:26) with 91 tracks.; Released in Japan by DigiCube.
Final Fantasy XI Original Soundtrack	June 5, 2002	none	none
Notes: Two CDs (1:51:57) with 51 tracks.; Released in Japan by DigiCube.
Final Fantasy XII Original Soundtrack	May 31, 2006	January 31, 2012	none
Notes: Four CDs (4:54:34) with 100 tracks.; Released in Japan by Aniplex.
Final Fantasy XIII Original Soundtrack	January 27, 2010	none	none
Notes: Four CDs (4:04:06) with 85 tracks.; Released in Japan by Square Enix.

== Companion books ==
Starting with Final Fantasy III, Square began publishing guide books for its games which traditionally include additional content such as developer interviews and expanded plot and setting information. Studio BentStuff wrote the first Ultimania book for Final Fantasy VIII in 1999, though the company had been contracted to write Final Fantasy VII True Script Dissection for the previous game. Since then, Ultimania books have been written for every major Final Fantasy title, including Battle Ultimania, Scenario Ultimania, and Ultimania Omega editions for some games. Square experimented with online content delivery with Final Fantasy IX Online Ultimania, but the move was criticized for forcing customers to buy a print guide while releasing most of the information online. Another online Ultimania was planned for Final Fantasy XI, but was dropped during development. Square Enix has produced expanded editions to some books, such as Final Fantasy VII 10th Anniversary Ultimania Revised Edition. In addition to the Ultimania series, Square Enix also publishes an Official Complete Guide series of guide books.

A set of three artbooks have also been produced under the title The Sky: The Art of Final Fantasy. The set was first released in Japan in May 2002 by Digicube, then released in North America as a boxed set a decade later on October 17, 2012, by Dark Horse Books with additional postcards, prints, and booklets. A third edition was released in a slipcase by Dark Horse Books on July 17, 2013, without the additional pieces. Each book features concept art by Yoshitaka Amano, with the first book covering Final Fantasy I through III, the second IV through VI, and the third VII through X.

== Novels and manga ==
Many Final Fantasy games have been adapted as novels and manga series. With the advent of the Internet, web novels and digital publishing have also become common. These stories act as companion pieces, offering an interpretation of the game's events or expanding the plot of the games by depicting additional scenarios.

Title	Original release date		
Title	Japan	North America	PAL region
Final Fantasy II Muma no Meikyū	March 20, 1989	none	none
Notes: Novelization of Final Fantasy II written by Kenji Terada.; Roughly translates to "Labyrinth of Nightmare".; (JP) ISBN 978-4-04-410604-1
Final Fantasy	December 30, 1989	none	none
Notes: Unauthorized manga adaptation of Final Fantasy written and illustrated by Yuu Kaimeiji.
Yūkyū no Kaze Densetsu Final Fantasy III	September 1992	none	none
Notes: Manga adaptation of Final Fantasy III by Yū Kinutani (art) and Kenji Terada (story).; Roughly translates to "Eternal Legend of the Wind".; (JP) ISBN 978-4-04-926037-3
Final Fantasy: The Spirits Within	none	June 26, 2001	none
Notes: Novelization of Final Fantasy: The Spirits Within by John Vornholt (YA version) and Dean Wesley Smith.; (NA) ISBN 978-0-7434-2419-6
Sō no Kizuna	March 2002	none	none
Notes: A side story to Final Fantasy: Unlimited.; Roughly translates to "The Bonds of Two".; (JP) ISBN 978-4-04-427701-7
Final Fantasy: Unlimited After	May 2002	none	none
Notes: A series of web novels published on the official Japanese Final Fantasy: Unlimited website, which continue the story of the anime.; Later published in a single anthology by DigiCube.; (JP) ISBN 4-88787-035-3
Final Fantasy XI ~The Out of Orders~	April 19, 2003	none	none
Notes: Manhwa set in the Final Fantasy XI continuity, by Kim Byung Jin (art) and Kim Sungjae (story).; (JP) ISBN 978-4-7577-1424-3
Final Fantasy XI	May 2003	none	none
Notes: Series of novels set in the Final Fantasy XI continuity, written by Miyabi Hasegawa.; Released in Japanese, German, and French.; (JP) ISBN 978-4-7577-1424-3
Final Fantasy Crystal Chronicles ~Hatenaki Sora no Mukō ni~	January 10, 2004	none	none
Notes: Manga adaptation of Final Fantasy Crystal Chronicles by Ryunosuke Ichikawa (three volumes).; Roughly translates to "Beyond the Endless Sky".; (JP) ISBN 4-7575-1455-7
On the Way to a Smile	September 14, 2005	February 20, 2007	February 20, 2007
Notes: Collection of two novellas, "Case of Denzel" and "Case of Tifa", set in Final Fantasy VII's continuity, written by Kazushige Nojima and published in the book Final Fantasy VII: Advent Children Prologue.; Released in English in the Advent Children Limited Edition Collector's Set along with "Case of Barret" written specifically for that release.; Four more stories, "Case of Yuffie", "Case of Red XIII", "Case of Shinra", and "Case of the Lifestream", and the previous three were published in a single anthology in Japan by Square Enix, on April 16, 2009.; (JP) ISBN 978-4-7575-2462-0
Final Fantasy XII	December 22, 2006	none	none
Notes: Manga adaptation of Final Fantasy XII by Gin Amou.; Five volumes published from 2006 to 2009.; (JP) ISBN 4-7575-1830-7 (Vol. 1), ISBN 978-4-7575-2082-0 (Vol. 2), ISBN 978-4-7575-2263-3 (Vol. 3), ISBN 978-4-7575-2442-2 (Vol. 4), ISBN 978-4-7575-2650-1 (Vol. 5)
Adventure Log	none	March 20, 2007	none
Notes: Official Final Fantasy XI webcomic.; Written and drawn by Scott Ramsoomair.
Final Fantasy Crystal Chronicles Ring of Fates 4 Komaansoroji Komikku	March 1, 2008	none	none
Notes: Manga adaptation of Final Fantasy Crystal Chronicles: Ring of Fates (2 volumes).; Translates to "Ring of Fates 4-Panel Anthology Comic".; (JP) ISBN 978-4-7577-4103-4
Final Fantasy IV	December 25, 2008	none	none
Notes: Two-volume novelization of Final Fantasy IV.; (JP) ISBN 4-7575-2458-7 (Vol. 1) ISBN 4-7575-2459-5 (Vol. 2)
Final Fantasy IV: The After	March 26, 2009	none	none
Notes: Novelization of Final Fantasy IV: The After Years.; (JP) ISBN 978-4-7575-2536-8
Final Fantasy XIII Episode Zero: Promise	September 28, 2009	April 30, 2019	February 15, 2011
Notes: Series of web novels written by Jun Eishima and first published on the official Japanese Final Fantasy XIII website, depicting the thirteen days leading up to the events of the game.; Later published in a single anthology by Square Enix on December 24, 2009.; (JP) ISBN 978-4-7575-2770-6
Final Fantasy: Memory of Heroes	October 31, 2012	August 18, 2020	none
Notes: Novel containing three short stories, each covering the story of Final Fantasy I, II, or III, written by Umemura Takashi.; (JP) ISBN 978-4-7575-3775-0
Final Fantasy Lost Stranger	July 12, 2017	August 28, 2018	none
Notes: Manga series set in a Final Fantasy style world; not an adaptation of any existing game; 13 volumes published from 2017 to present

== See also ==
- List of Kingdom Hearts media
