= Final Fantasy XI =

2002 video game

- Game logo
- Developer: Square
- Publishers: PlayStation 2; JP: Square; NA: Sony Computer Entertainment; Microsoft Windows, Xbox 360; Square Enix
- Directors: Koichi Ishii (1999–2003); Nobuaki Komoto (2003–2008); Koichi Ogawa (2008–2010); Akihiko Matsui (2010); Mizuki Ito (2010–2016); Yoji Fujito (2016–)
- Producers: Hiromichi Tanaka (1999–2012); Akihiko Matsui (2012–2023); Yoji Fujito (2023–)
- Designer: Hiromichi Tanaka
- Programmer: Ken Narita
- Artist: Ryosuke Aiba
- Writers: Nobuaki Komoto; Masato Kato
- Composers: Naoshi Mizuta; Kumi Tanioka; Nobuo Uematsu
- Series: Final Fantasy
- Platforms: PlayStation 2 (Note: Until March 31, 2016); Microsoft Windows; Xbox 360
- Release: May 16, 2002: PlayStation 2; JP: May 16, 2002; NA: March 23, 2004; Microsoft Windows; JP: November 7, 2002; NA: October 28, 2003; EU: September 17, 2004; Xbox 360; NA: April 18, 2006; JP: April 20, 2006; EU: April 21, 2006
- Genre: MMORPG
- Mode: Multiplayer

Final Fantasy XI, (Note: Japanese: ファイナルファンタジーXI, Hepburn: Fainaru Fantajī Irebun) also known as Final Fantasy XI Online, is a massively multiplayer online role-playing game (MMORPG), originally developed and published by Square and then published by Square Enix as the eleventh main installment of the Final Fantasy series. Designed and produced by Hiromichi Tanaka, it was released in Japan on May 16, 2002, for PlayStation 2 and Microsoft Windows-based personal computers in November of that year. The game was the first MMORPG to offer cross-platform play between PlayStation 2 and Windows. It was later released for the Xbox 360 in April 2006. All versions of the game require a monthly subscription to play.

The story is set in the fantasy world of Vana'diel, where player-created avatars can both compete and cooperate in a variety of objectives to develop an assortment of job & skills, and earn in-game item rewards. Players can undertake an array of quests and progress through the in-game hierarchy and through the major plot of the game. Since its debut in 2002, five expansion packs have been released along with eight add-on scenarios. Each expansion pack and add-on brings a new major storyline to the Final Fantasy XI world, along with numerous areas, quests, events and item rewards.

In 2015, Square Enix released the final main scenario for Final Fantasy XI, titled Rhapsodies of Vana'diel. Final Fantasy XI became the final active server on the PlayStation 2 online service. Support for the PlayStation 2 and Xbox 360 versions ended on March 31, 2016, leaving only the PC platform playable. A mobile client for the game was under development by Square Enix in collaboration with Korean developer Nexon, using Unreal Engine 4, but was cancelled in late 2020. A spin-off mobile game, Final Fantasy Grandmasters was released on September 30, 2015. A new, episodic story series titled The Voracious Resurgence was added to the game in 2020. In May 2022 rumors circulated that FFXI might soon shut down, but Yoji Fujito released a statement noting that this was not the case and users should not worry about the services being shut down any time soon.

In 2025, a surge in new players, roughly coinciding with the release of the Echoes of Vana'diel raids within Final Fantasy XIV: Dawntrail, has resulted in overpopulation in several game servers ("worlds"). As a result, the server Asura was closed off for new characters on July 29, 2025, followed by Bahamut on October 9, 2025, Odin on March 10, 2026, and Phoenix on June 10, 2026. As of June 2026, those servers remain closed off. New characters cannot be created on these servers, except for secondary characters on accounts that already have a character on the same server, and existing characters cannot be transferred to those servers using the world transfer service.

== Gameplay ==
Final Fantasy XI is a massively multiplayer online role-playing game (MMORPG), and differs from previous titles in the series in several ways. Unlike the predefined main characters of previous Final Fantasy titles, players are able to customize their characters in limited ways, including selecting from one of five races and choosing their gender, facial style, hair color, body size, job, and nation allegiance. Also diverging from previous games in the series, the game takes place in a fully three-dimensional landscape with enemies freely roaming in it, allowing battles to occur in real time as opposed to the random encounters used in previous games — a trend continued in every numbered Final Fantasy title since.

There are currently 16 public game worlds available for play, down from 32 at the game's height, with approximately 15,000 to 20,000 players in each. A private Test Server was opened to eligible players to provide feedback on updates in development for the game in mid-2011. The servers are named after summoned monsters from previous Final Fantasy titles, such as Ifrit and Diabolos. Players have the ability to move between servers, though Square Enix charges a "world transfer" fee to do so. There are no region-specific or system-specific servers, and unlike most online games, players of different languages play in the same world and can interact through automatic language translation from a library of translated phrases.

=== Interface ===
A player engages in a dialog sequence to advance the story.

Players have the option of using any combination of a keyboard, mouse, and controller to play Final Fantasy XI. While, by default, a player using a PlayStation 2 or an Xbox 360 uses a virtual/in-game keyboard option, the player is able to use an external keyboard that is USB compatible for communication within the game. The heads-up display in Final Fantasy XI consists of a log window, menus, and several game information elements. The log window at the bottom of the screen displays system messages, battle messages, and text input by other players. Players may choose to filter what appears in the log window. Menus allow the player to access different commands, status windows, and configuration options. The "action command" menu appears just above the log window and gives the player several options to interact with the game world. Several menu options are available through the use of keyboard shortcuts as well.

=== Basic gameplay ===
Story related gameplay in Final Fantasy XI consists of two major components: missions, through which the main storyline of the game is told, and quests, which do not advance the main storyline, but fill out the game's fantasy world. Completing missions allows a player to advance in rank, which grants access to new areas, several privileges, and various other storylines. At first, a player may only complete missions for their home nation, though they are able to change allegiances later on, allowing access to other nations' storylines. Quests may be undertaken for their various rewards, or to acquire "fame", which allows a character to become well-known and respected by NPCs; a higher fame rating will open up new interactions and quests with NPCs. At release, over one hundred quests were available to play and each expansion pack has added its own set of missions and quests. Players obtain in-game money known as gil by completing missions or quests and defeating Beastmen, though unlike previous Final Fantasy games, these monsters drop only small amounts. Gil can then be exchanged amongst players for goods through the Auction House, or be used to purchase items and rewards from NPCs.

Unlike some MMORPGs, there is very little focus on player versus player (PvP) combat; the game instead revolves around player versus environment (PvE). There are numerous PvE activities and events for players to partake in, including instanced activities and shared spaces activities. Some instanced events include Dynamis, Salvage, Assault and Nyzul Isle, which involve anywhere between 6 and 64 players. These battle grounds give players a series of objectives to overcome or complete and enemies to defeat, generally within a certain time frame. Popular shared spaces activities include hunting Notorious Monsters, fiends that rarely appear and drop precious loot.

The only way to attack other players in PvP is to enter one on one competition activities known as "Conflict". The first form of competition, called Ballista, involves players competing to score points by throwing petras into a castle-like structure known as a Rook. The second form is known as "Brenner", and resembles capture the flag.

From time to time special seasonal festivals and events are held. They last only for a set period of time and offer a variety of fun or useful rewards. Many events have changed over time, adding new features and eliminating old ones. These events are geared towards any level, often restricting players to level 1, so that veterans and novice players alike can join in together. Events celebrated are often thematically based on real life equivalents, such as Valentione's Day in place of Valentine's Day, the Egg Hunt Egg-stravaganza in place of Easter, and the Starlight Celebration in place of Christmas.

=== Battle and party system ===
Battles in Final Fantasy XI take place in the world in which players move around, a first in the series, where battle had previously taken place in a separate screen via random encounters. The surprise of the random encounter system is achieved via aggressive monsters, who will attack players based on different factors such as sight and sound. This format would continue in future Final Fantasy games. Monsters within the game operate under a system of "claim" and "enmity". A monster is claimed the moment a player performs any offensive action upon it, whether physical, magical or ability related. With some exceptions, once a monster is claimed it can only be attacked by players in the party or alliance of the player that claimed it. A monster will focus its attention on whoever has built up the most enmity. Players have several means at their disposal, including spells, abilities and items, to build up enmity or shed it to their advantage in battle - a factor that features heavily in group, or "party" play.

To defeat more powerful monsters and gain experience points efficiently, players can join a party. A regular party has room for six members. Like in many other games, a well-balanced party will consist of several archetypes- namely a healer, a tank (the party member with high defense that will be the main target of the monster), and the damage dealer. The enmity system comes into play heavily in parties, as players try to keep the monsters attention off fragile jobs and on the tanks. One of the key aspects of the battle system lies in the extreme flexibility of the party composition: unlike many other games, there are no constraints on the role (or "job" class) of the party members. This feature allows to tackle every fight with a wide array of different strategies, while encouraging the community to share new, creative ways of handling a certain type of enemy.

A party can expand into an alliance, with up to three parties combined, with a total of 18 players. Alliances are necessary to complete more difficult challenges: including missions, quests, nation or territory driven events, and defeating notorious monsters. Much of end-game play consists of alliance forces overcoming these higher level challenges and can even allow several alliances to enter into specific instances owned by a group of players (e.g. Dynamis instances entry is controlled by an hourglass item).

Final Fantasy XI's incarnation of Limit Breaks are "Weapon Skills". Physical damage given and received fills a Tactical Points (TP) bar, to a maximum of 3000. Any amount above 1000 is able to be used up by being channelled into a weapon skill. These skills vary in effect depending on job class, what weapon is equipped, how full the TP bar is, and how proficient the player is with the weapon. If partying with other players, one may use these weapon skills in succession in order to create a "skillchain". A skillchain creates additional damage after a series of weapon skills are used, and magic used on a skillchain at the right time will receive a boost to its damage; this is called a "Magic Burst". In order to create the best possible skillchains and magic bursts, players must work together, focusing on each other's actions and timing.

=== Job system ===
Final Fantasy XI uses the concept of changing Jobs in a similar fashion to Final Fantasy III. The unique system of Final Fantasy XI's job system is the "Support Job". This system allows a player to augment their character with abilities, traits, and spells from another chosen job, at half the level of their current job. For instance, a Level 20 Warrior setting Ninja as their support job would allow them to use all Ninja abilities, traits, and spells up to that of a level 10 Ninja, while still primarily being a Level 20 Warrior. The support job system allows for job-merges never before seen in the Final Fantasy series.

=== Crafting and hobbies ===
The raising, breeding, and racing of Chocobos was a much requested addition to the game.

In addition to completing quests and missions, players can participate in several side-minigames and other activities. One such minigame is fishing, where players can measure their strength against the fish they attempt to catch. Another is clamming, where players collect as many fish or sea creatures as possible without going over their bucket's size limit. Gardening allows players to raise plants in their residence, or "Mog House" as it is known in the game. The raising and breeding of Chocobos was a long-requested activity enabled in the summer 2006 update. Chocobo racing began in March 2007, which allowed for the racing of player-raised Chocobos against non-player characters (NPCs). Winning racers can earn "Chocobucks", which can be used to buy, for example, items that assist Chocobo breeding.

An important part of the game is the accumulation of items, especially rare ones, which allow players to create powerful weapons, armour and food. There are many ways to obtain items, such as harvesting, excavating, logging, mining, defeating monsters, and digging by using Chocobos. Square Enix attempted to increase the opportunity for players to find rare items in order to equalize the game and stop the practice of "gil selling", or exchanging real money for in-game items. The item auction system was shut down temporarily once due to some players exploiting the system. Items can be created by consuming elemental crystals (obtained by fighting monsters) with other ingredients in a process called "synthesis". Recipe results can vary widely based on the player's skill, the quality of the player's equipment worn, and the ingredients used. There is large speculation (though nothing evidently documented yet) about the moon phase, direction the player is facing, in-game day (every day of the week is assigned an element), and even time of day the synthesis is performed to either increase or reduce the results of the recipe.

=== Game economy ===
Final Fantasy XI has a largely player-based economy, with a heavy reliance on auction houses in each of the major cities of Vana'diel. There are certain economic controls in place mainly in the form of fees for putting items up for auction. Transportation, auction house, item storage, and fees do not go to players; these gil sinks effectively remove money from the economy to prevent inflation. The city of Jeuno used to levy a tax on bazaar purchases inside the city, but was removed in a patch in the December 2008 version update.

Square Enix has stated that the trade of items for real currency is officially a violation of the Terms of Service for Final Fantasy XI. In early 2006, Square Enix discovered that a group of players had found a way to generate game currency and exchange it for real currency, which, in turn, drove up prices for all items across the game. In response, 700 accounts were permanently banned and 300 billion gil was removed from circulation. That July, Square Enix banned or suspended over 8,000 other accounts for similar manipulation and commerce.

== Plot ==
=== Setting ===
The setting of Final Fantasy XI is the world of Vana'diel, a rich world with diverse climates, ranging from northern glaciers and southern deserts, to ethereal realms and sky landmasses. Vana'diel is divided into a number of regions, which are subdivided into areas known as "zones". These zones are available for exploration and consist of outdoor areas, dungeons, cities, and towns. Players are able to explore a portion of Vana'diel, including the Middle Lands, Near East, and with the release of Seekers of Adoulin, the near west. Six city-states exist in the available lands: the Republic of Bastok, the Kingdom of San d'Oria, the Federation of Windurst, the Grand Duchy of Jeuno, the Empire of Aht Urhgan and the Sacred City of Adoulin. While most areas are accessible by walking, various modes of transportation, ranging from the classic Final Fantasy Chocobo and airships to special spells, facilitate movement across the game world.

Ancient lore states that Vana'diel was created as a playground for the Gods and their children, who themselves were spawned from an enormous and sentient Crystal. Eventually wishing to be one with the Gods, the children constructed a pathway to paradise. They were smote down for their insolence and their cities cast to the bottom of the sea. After seeing the destruction of her children and filled with sadness, the Goddess Altana wept five tears that gave life to the five Enlightened Races of Vana'diel. The God of Twilight, Promathia, condemned her weakness and the life that arose from it. Promathia cursed the five races with eternal conflict amongst themselves by bringing forth their darkest attributes: the apathy of the Humes, the arrogance of the Elvaan, the rage of the Galka, the cowardice of the Tarutaru, and the envy of the Mithra. He created the Beastmen, commanding them to forever fight the people of Vana'diel and occupy their minds, so these children would never have time to group together and construct a pathway like the ones before them. The creation lore's sentient Crystal, Gods, Children, and the truths behind them feature as major plot points in several Final Fantasy XI expansion packs, while the Beastmen are some of the game's main antagonists.

The events of the game are set 20 years after the Crystal War, a devastating war where the Middle Land nations of Bastok, San d'Oria and Windurst fought and defeated the Shadow Lord and his army of Beastmen. Players deal with the aftermath of this conflict in the original story, and may travel back in time to aid in the war effort with the expansion pack Wings of the Goddess. Several parallel worlds are available, such as Dynamis and Abyssea, in which the beastmen won the Crystal War and conquered the land.

=== Characters ===
Final Fantasy XI features five playable races known as the "Enlightened Races":

The playable races in Final Fantasy XI. From left to right: Galka, Mithra, Hume, Elvaan, and Tarutaru.

Elvaan
A race of proud warriors, the Elvaan's home city is the Kingdom of San d'Oria. Elvaan have an unshakable pride and faith in their beliefs, and many eschew the business world, preferring an austere lifestyle as skilled sword fighters. The Elvaan race possesses high strength and mind, but low MP and intelligence. Elvaan are said to be cursed with the sin of arrogance.

Hume
Originating from the city of Bastok, Humes are the most common race in Vana'diel and are known for their intelligence and high level of skill in numerous areas. Humes have equally balanced abilities, and are said to be cursed with the sin of apathy. They serve as the game's human race.

Galka
A hulking race of powerful warriors, the Galka's capital city was destroyed by war 600 years ago. Many of the surviving Galka settled in Bastok, and are currently used by the city as cheap underclass labour. The Galka do not have a female counterpart, but reproduce through reincarnation. They possess the highest HP and vitality in the game, but also the lowest MP. The Galka are cursed with rage.

Mithra
The Mithra are a race of hunters who live alongside the Tarutaru in Windurst. They are known for their energy, curiosity, and their penchant for causing playful mischief. Due to a gender imbalance in their race males are a rarity, and so only female mithra leave the home, making females the only playable gender. Mithra possess high dexterity and agility, but lower HP and charisma. Mithra are cursed with envy.

Tarutaru
A race of skilled magic users from the Federation of Windurst, the Tarutaru physically resemble children, however their size does not reflect their age. Tarutaru are playful yet cunning. They possess the highest MP and intelligence of all the races, but the lowest HP and strength. Tarutaru are said to be cursed with cowardice.

In addition to the playable races, there are two other non-playable Enlightened Races, known as the Zilart and the Kuluu. These ancient races were thought to be extinct, and are the focus of the first two-game expansions. There is also a large supporting cast of NPCs involved in quests, missions and the game's storylines. The game features several typical Final Fantasy fiends, including Goblins, Sahagins and Tonberries. Several of these races are known as Beastmen, a distinction made between fiends who possess higher than average intelligence, exhibiting self-awareness, emotions, culture, and religion. The complex relationship, bigoted views, and reasons of conflict between the Enlightened Races and Beastmen is a plot point throughout the game.

Final Fantasy XI is represented in the Dissidia game series by Shantotto, a female Tarutaru Black Mage from the Windurst storyline, voiced by famed voice actress Megumi Hayashibara in the Japanese version and Candi Milo in the English version. The game's prequel adds Prishe, a female Elvaan from Tavnazia, who is the main character in the Chains of Promathia expansion pack.

=== Story ===
The storyline is primarily followed with missions through the governing nations that exist in the base game as well as each expansion that the player is affiliated with. Nation or governing body affiliation is relatively simple, sometimes requiring prerequisite quests being completed and have several stages of progression to achieve higher recognition and reward throughout each story. Some missions are even required to be completed to further progress into the start of the additional storylines of each expansion or specific areas.

Players begin the game as residents of one of the three main countries: San d'Oria, Bastok, and Windurst, and must help band the nations together against the resurrected Shadow Lord.

The expansion Rise of the Zilart reveals that the Crystal War and the resurrection of the Shadow Lord had been masterminded by the Zilart princes Eald'Narche and Kam'lanaut, who survived the extinction of their race. The two Zilarts plan to become Gods by opening the path to paradise, and the player is charged with thwarting their plans.

Chains of Promathia revolves around an Elvaan girl named Prishe and the dead Twilight God Promathia, who had originally cursed the Zilart race, and the attempts of various factions to either complete or stop his resurrection. The wyrmking Bahamut is involved in these events, and intends to destroy Vana'diel to prevent Promathia from absorbing the life of the world.

Treasures of Aht Urhgan concerns the Empire of Aht Urhgan which opens up to the nations of midlands after years of self-imposed isolation. As a new and powerful nation, it is of concern to the nation of the player, who is sent as a representative. The player then becomes embroiled in the intrigues of the Empress's court and the growing fears of war and darkness coming to Aht Urhgan.

Wings of the Goddess primarily occurs in the era of the Crystal War, 20 years in the past from the main Final Fantasy XI setting. The player discovers and crosses mysterious time portals alongside the Hume/Elvaan mix Lilisette, and are led to help the Regal Feline Cait Sith reduce the suffering of the era. However, Lilisette and her partner encounter Lilith, an alternate timeline version of herself who wishes to keep the war going to maintain her time while negating Lilisette's.

Seekers of Adoulin concerns the western continent archipelago of Adoulin, and the Sacred City of Adoulin. The city was a focal point for colonization 200 years before the present game, but when colonization efforts failed in the main continent of Ulbuka, the nation fell in population and shifted to trade as a focus. Now colonization has begun once again, and players are free to explore the region.

Rhapsodies of Vana'diel concerns the conclusion of the previous Final Fantasy XI storylines with the threat posed by the Cloud of Darkness and an alternate timeline version of the player.

The Voracious Resurgence, the follow-up story to Rhapsodies of Vana'diel, concerns the mysterious "world eater eggs" appearing all throughout the land of Vana'diel.

== Development ==
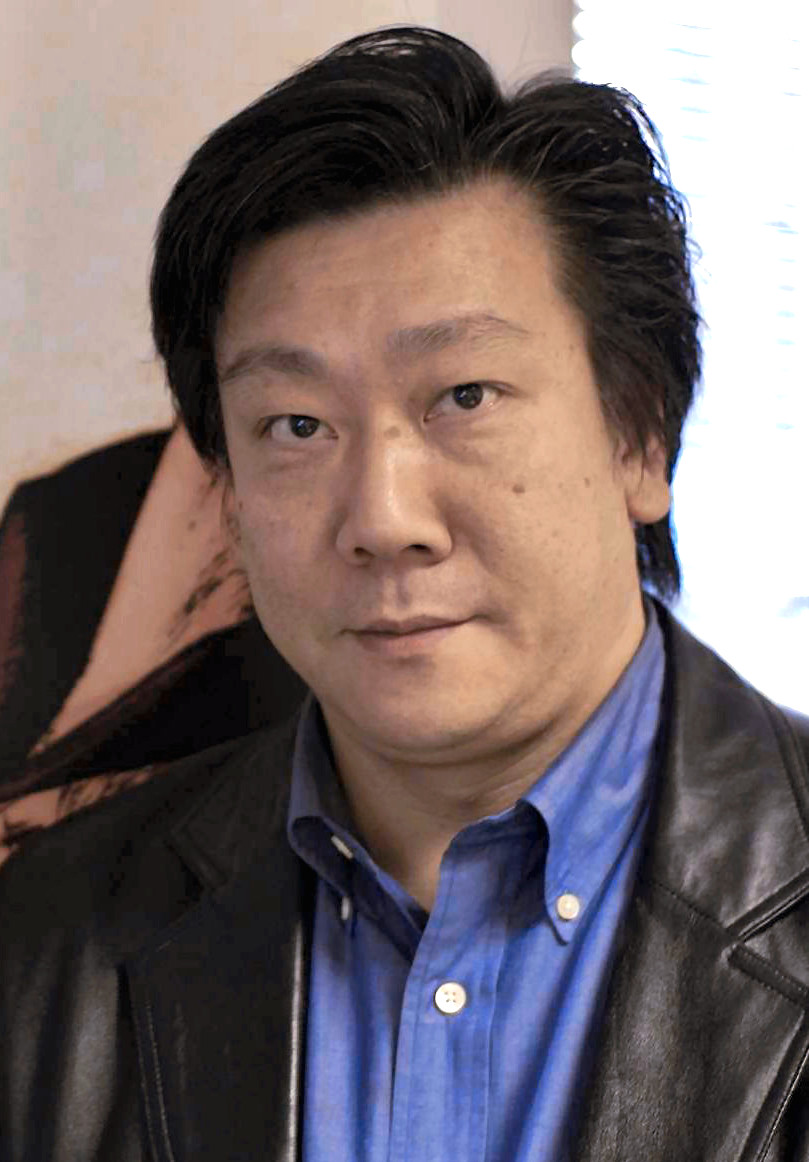
Final Fantasy XI is the most representative title of the Final Fantasy series, according to producer Hiromichi Tanaka.

The idea to develop Final Fantasy XI as an online game was conceived by Hironobu Sakaguchi when establishing Square Pictures' headquarters in Hawaii. Impressed by western MMORPGs that he discovered there, such as EverQuest, Sakaguchi convinced Square to begin the development of their own MMORPG and suggested that it be based on the Final Fantasy series. Since MMORPG creation was seen as a "greater cause", Final Fantasy XI was made by a merger of four crews: the Parasite Eve II and Brave Fencer Musashi teams from Osaka, and the Mana and Chrono Cross teams from Tokyo. Development began in November 1999. The game was the first developed under Square's new philosophy to develop for "all platforms and media". Hiromichi Tanaka, the producer of the game, said that the title is heavily influenced by Final Fantasy III, especially in its battle and magic systems. According to Tanaka, Square put in Final Fantasy XI what they could not put in the first Final Fantasy titles due to technical limitations, thus making XI the "most [representative] Final Fantasy of all the episodes". The game was developed and ran on the Nvidia GeForce 4 Ti GPU, which the President of Square Yoichi Wada described as the most powerful graphics processor available at the time. The game cost two to three billion yen (~$17–25 million) to create along with the PlayOnline Network Service and was assumed to become profitable over a five-year timespan. By creating a unified game world instead of different ones balkanized by language, development costs were cut 66%. Since recurring monsters of the series are known by different names in the Japanese and English versions of the other installments, it was decided for Final Fantasy XI to use both Japanese and English names for different varieties of the same monsters.

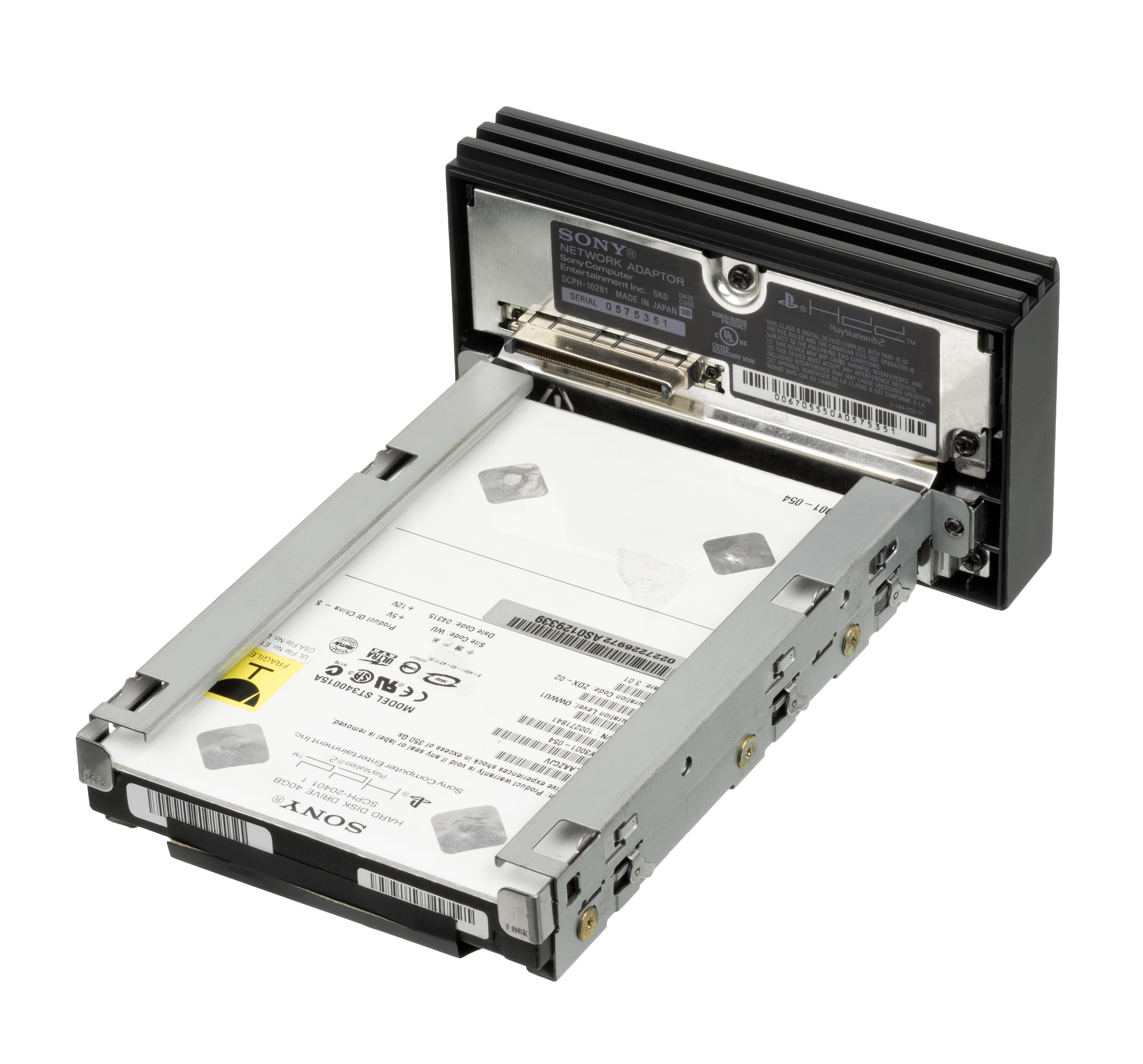
The PlayStation 2 version of the game came with a 40GB hard drive that required the Network Adaptor to connect to the system.

A simultaneous release on the PlayStation 2 and Microsoft Windows as well as concurrent Japanese and American release was originally considered, but this was later changed. There was also discussion of an Xbox release, but was abandoned mainly because of its small 8 GB hard drive. Originally announced on January 29, 2000, at the Square Millennium Conference in Yokohama, there was a great deal of negative press. There were questions raised about naming the game the eleventh in the series, since it was not clear whether the game would have a structured story, which it ended up having, and the title of Final Fantasy Online was suggested. Following an August 2001 beta test in Japan, a public Japanese beta test was done four months later in December.

Following its PC release, Final Fantasy XI was listed as one of IGN's most anticipated PlayStation 2 games of 2004. Sony launched a multimillion-dollar ad campaign to promote the game along with the PlayStation 2 hard drive add-on which the game required. Having been released on the PlayStation 2 as well as the personal computer, it became the first cross-platform MMORPG ever created. On June 14, 2002, the game server was down for four hours for maintenance to the database servers, bug fixes on the text interface, and a new patch for the game client. This is thought to be the first patch ever released for a console game. Other early issues included complaints by American players that experienced Japanese players had already completed all the quests. Square Enix responded by adding new servers in order to have game worlds with fewer expert players.

Final Fantasy XI is one of the first cross-console video games, and has continued to update its software to allow the game to run on new consoles. In March 2007, a patch was released to enable gameplay in French and German. Square Enix noted that Nintendo's use of "Friend Codes" was the primary reason XI was not brought to the Wii. In December 2006, the PlayStation 2 versions of PlayOnline and Final Fantasy XI were able to install and run on the PlayStation 3. The Vana'diel Collection 2008 discs for the PlayStation 2 had installation issues on the PlayStation 3, causing them to be unusable at first since they were not on Sony's list of HDD compatible titles in the firmware the PlayStation 3 had at the time. This problem was fixed in December 2007 when Sony released firmware update 2.10 for the PlayStation 3. This allowed all backwards compatible models—20GB model #CECHB01, 60GB model #CECHA01 and 80GB model #CECHE01—to play XI. After working with Microsoft to resolve the game's incompatibility issues with Windows Vista, Square Enix released a downloadable version of the PlayOnline client which is compatible with the operating system, although small bugs have appeared.

In September 2010, Akihiko Matsui became the director of Final Fantasy XI. Only three months later, on December 10, Matsui left the team to work as "Lead Combat System Designer" on Square Enix's new MMO, Final Fantasy XIV. His replacement as director of XI is Mizuki Ito. At one point in 2011, Square Enix considered to port Final Fantasy XI for Sony PlayStation Vita. On June 24, at the end of VanaFest 2012, a festival in Yokohama, Japan to celebrate the tenth anniversary of the Japanese launch of Final Fantasy XI, Hiromichi Tanaka, for health reasons, decided to step down as producer of the game and leave Square-Enix. Akihiko Matsui was selected to replace him. In March 2023, Yoji Fujito replaced Matsui as the producer, while Matsui would in some form continue supporting Final Fantasy XI.

In 2006, between 200,000 and 300,000 active players logged in per day, with 500,000 total active players and around 150,000 online at any one time. By April 2009, the total number of active characters exceeded 2 million for the first time. By June 2012, Final Fantasy XI became the most profitable title in the Final Fantasy series.

=== Music ===
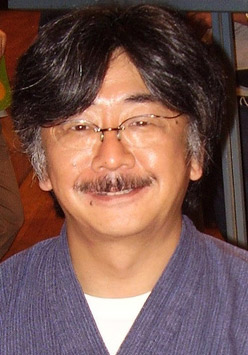
Uematsu emphasized cross-cultural communication in his compositions.

The music of Final Fantasy XI was composed by Naoshi Mizuta, Kumi Tanioka, and Nobuo Uematsu. Composer Yasunori Mitsuda was also asked to contribute, but at the time he was unable to do so, as he was busy scoring Xenosaga. The game's five expansion packs since were scored by Mizuta alone, after Tanioka left to pursue other projects and Uematsu left Square Enix. The opening of the game features choral music with lyrics in Esperanto. According to Uematsu, the choice of language was meant to symbolize the developers' hope that their online game could contribute to cross-cultural communication and cooperation. He also noted the increased difficulty of scoring a game for which there was no linear plotline, a major change from the previous Final Fantasy games. It was the first game in the series for which he composed while he was no longer a Square Enix employee.

The game's music has been released in CD form several times and has been featured in Final Fantasy concerts. Some of the game's music has been released on iTunes, such as the vocal "Distant Worlds", which was released on the Japanese iTunes store on September 13, 2005, having been put in the game in a July 2005 patch. A compilation CD box was released on March 28, 2007, titled Final Fantasy XI Original Soundtrack Premium Box, which included the four original soundtracks from Final Fantasy XI and its three expansion sets, as well as the previously unreleased tracks from the game and the unreleased Final Fantasy XI Piano Collections. Dear Friends -Music from Final Fantasy-, a 2004–05 concert series, featured "Ronfaure" from Final Fantasy XI. A ten-track album of music inspired by Final Fantasy XI entitled Music from the Other Side of Vana'diel was released by The Star Onions on August 24, 2005.

== Expansions and add-ons ==
Final Fantasy XI has additions released every few years. Expansion packs add new story, jobs, zones, quests, and content to the game, while add-ons are smaller in scale, adding a smaller selection of the aforementioned items. Until the discontinuation of the Xbox 360 and PS2 versions, all of the expansions and add-ons had been released on PlayStation 2, Microsoft Windows, and Xbox 360, with the exception of Seekers of Adoulin, which did not see a PlayStation 2 release outside Japan.

Title	Type	Year	Notes
Rise of the Zilart (ジラートの幻影, Jirāto no Gen'ei; lit. "Phantoms of the Zilart")	Expansion pack	JP: 2003; NA: 2003; PAL: 2004	When news was first circulated about an expansion to Final Fantasy XI, it was thought that the game's title would be Final Fantasy XI: Vision of Girade and was unclear whether it would be a free upgrade or not. The Xbox Live version was also beta tested to see how their online playing system supported Final Fantasy XI. A demo version of the Xbox 360 release of the game was the first game on the Xbox 360 to require the use of its hard drive addition. The game introduced the Dragoon as well as the Samurai and Ninja.
Chains of Promathia (プロマシアの呪縛, Puromashia no Jubaku; lit. "Curse of Promathia")	Expansion pack	JP: 2004; NA: 2004; PAL: 2004	On November 7, 2006, a new version of "Vana'diel Collection" for 2007 was released including the original game and both expansions. Forty new areas were made available to explore, as well as new quests and missions, but no new jobs for characters to learn or new game mechanics.
Treasures of Aht Urhgan (アトルガンの秘宝, Atorugan no Hihō; lit. "Hidden Treasure of Aht Urhgan")	Expansion pack	JP: 2006; NA: 2006; PAL: 2006	The game was also released on the Xbox 360 bundled with all three of the expansions released to date, and on the PC as "Vana'diel Collection 2007". The expansion included three new jobs; Puppetmaster, Corsair, and Blue Mage. The expansion's final update in fall 2007 finally allowed the player to advance to the rank of "Captain".
Wings of the Goddess (アルタナの神兵, Arutana no Shinpei; lit. "Divine Soldiers of Altana")	Expansion pack	JP: 2007; NA: 2007; PAL: 2007	The fourth expansion of Final Fantasy XI was released in 2007. The expansion shipped for PlayStation 2 and Xbox 360 on November 20; the PC version was delayed until November 21 due to manufacturing issues. The expansion went live and became playable on November 22, 2007. On November 20, Square Enix updated Final Fantasy XI in preparation for the expansion. This update included a new large-scale battle known as "Campaign" and various new spells and job abilities. The Dancer and Scholar jobs were introduced in the expansion, and their equipment known as "artifact armor" was released in the March 10, 2008, update.
A Crystalline Prophecy: Ode of Life Bestowing	Add-on scenario	2009	Masato Kato, the original scenario writer of Final Fantasy XI and the expansion pack Rise of the Zilart returned to work on these features. Unlike traditional expansion packs, these chapters, conceived as interactive "novelettes", focused on deepening the storylines of existing locations rather than introducing new areas. Moogle Kupo d'Etat was originally conceived to be a scary story, but became comical as it was developed. The series of add-ons was made to tie up several storylines that developers such as Masato Kato had wanted to see well concluded. Some experienced players criticized the add-ons simple "fetch quest" beginning, which later Kato explained was made for beginner players.
A Moogle Kupo d'Etat: Evil in Small Doses	Add-on scenario	2009	
A Shantotto Ascension: The Legend Torn, Her Empire Born	Add-on scenario	2009	
Vision of Abyssea	Add-on battlefield	2010	Abyssea is a realm composed of battle areas created with characters level 75 and above in mind. There, players partake in activities such as leveling, engaging battles against foes, and collecting powerful equipment. It was the first paid for addition to Final Fantasy XI that did not have a focus on adding new storylines.
Scars of Abyssea	Add-on battlefield	2010	Abyssea is a realm composed of battle areas created with characters level 75 and above in mind. There, players partake in activities such as leveling, engaging battles against foes, and collecting powerful equipment. It was the first paid for addition to Final Fantasy XI that did not have a focus on adding new storylines.
Heroes of Abyssea	Add-on battlefield	2010	Abyssea is a realm composed of battle areas created with characters level 75 and above in mind. There, players partake in activities such as leveling, engaging battles against foes, and collecting powerful equipment. It was the first paid for addition to Final Fantasy XI that did not have a focus on adding new storylines.
Seekers of Adoulin (アドゥリンの魔境, Adourin no Makyō?; lit. "Illusions of Adoulin")	Expansion pack	2013	The fifth expansion for Final Fantasy XI, Seekers of Adoulin, was announced at VanaFest 2012, a celebration of the tenth anniversary of the Japanese launch of the game, in Yokohama, Japan. Two new jobs are featured in the new expansion, Geomancer and Rune Fencer. The expansion also contains seven powerful bosses, and a new western continent called Adoulin. Seekers of Adoulin was then the last game released on the PlayStation 2 in Asia.
Rhapsodies of Vana'diel	Main scenario	NA: 2015; JP: 2015; PAL: 2015	Rhapsodies of Vana'diel was released as the final main scenario, and serves to tie together all storylines and characters across fourteen years of Final Fantasy XI. The scenario consists of three separate chapters released for free, debuting in the May, August, and November 2015 version updates, respectively.
The Voracious Resurgence	Add-on scenario	NA: 2020; JP: 2020; PAL: 2020	The Voracious Resurgence is an additional add-on scenario, requiring completion of Rhapsodies of Vana'diel before being able to play through its content. The scenario has been released in episodic installments as part of regular version updates at no additional cost like its predecessor. It is the first story expansion after Rhapsodies of Vana'diel, which had been designed as a conclusion to the game's content. The final chapter of The Voracious Resurgence was released in May 2023.

== Reception ==
=== Critical reception ===
Reception

Aggregate scores
Aggregator	Score
GameRankings	PS2: 85% PC: 82% X360: 69%
Metacritic	PS2: 85/100; PC: 85/100; X360: 66/100

Review scores
Publication	Score
Famitsu	10/10, 9/10, 10/10, 9/10
GameSpot	8.2/10
GameSpy	4/5
IGN	8.8/10

Final Fantasy XI received positive reviews from critics. Aggregating review websites GameRankings and Metacritic gave the PlayStation 2 version 85% based on 57 reviews and 85/100 based on 49 reviews, the PC version 82% based on 44 reviews and 85/100 based on 25 reviews the Xbox 360 version 69% based on 32 reviews and 66/100 based on 25 reviews. Computer and Video Games Magazine noted that it was one of the most welcoming MMORPGs despite the cumbersome initial registration and setup. IGN called it a well done but unoriginal game and also noted that North American players were forced to play with already much more experienced Japanese players who had already completed the game's various quests. GameSpot criticized it at release for having an unconventional control system, a lengthy installation, and having no player versus player (PvP) aspects. Other elements receiving criticism include the EXP grind, which involves constant battles to access different parts of the game, and overcrowded camp sites. The expansions have been mostly positively received, with praise for the amount of content added, but increasing signs that the graphics of the game are becoming outdated. The IGN review of the Xbox 360 release was similar, noting that it was a large amount of game content, but had a protracted setup process and elements of the game design that require a large time investment.

=== Sales and subscriptions ===
The user base for the PlayStation 2 version was truncated initially because of limited sales of the PlayStation 2's hard drive and network adapters that were needed for the game. The Japanese release of Rise of the Zilart was the number one selling game when it debuted in 2003 with 90,000 copies sold in the first week. The Treasures of Aht Urhgan, released three years later, sold over 103,000 copies for the PlayStation 2 in Japan during 2006. In the United States, Final Fantasy XI's computer version sold 340,000 copies ($15.5 million) by August 2006, after its release in October 2003. It was the country's 51st best-selling computer game between January 2000 and August 2006. The Final Fantasy XI All-in-One Pack was number 36 and Wings of the Goddess was number 40 on the top 50 best-selling Xbox 360 games in Japan as of December 2007. For the April–September 2004 financial period, Square Enix saw online gaming, particularly Final Fantasy XI, sales increase by 101 percent and operating profit increase by 230.9 percent. Revenues held steady from subscription services in the summer of 2006; in the fall, however, Square acknowledged that online subscription revenues were "unsatisfactory", despite the steady performance of Final Fantasy XI. By December 2003, there were over 200,000 subscribers to Final Fantasy XI, allowing the company to break even and start making a profit. There were between 200,000 and 300,000 active players daily in 2006. As of August 2006, the Xbox 360 version was the sixth most played game on Xbox Live. As of 2008, the game had 500,000 subscribers. By June 2012, Final Fantasy XI became the most profitable title in the Final Fantasy series. While many MMOs have switched to some form of free-to-play model, the base monthly subscription price point for Final Fantasy XI has remained the same at $11.95 since its debut in 2002.

=== Awards and legacy ===
Final Fantasy XI was awarded the grand prize from the Japan's Consumer Entertainment Software Association (CESA) for 2002–2003 along with Taiko no Tatsujin. It has also received GameSpy's 2003 PC MMORPG Game of the Year Award and IGN's Game of the Month for March 2004, citing the game's huge customization and its successful cross-platform and cross-language game world. It received a runner-up position in GameSpot's 2004 "Best Massively Multiplayer Online Game" award category, losing to World of Warcraft. During the 8th Annual Interactive Achievement Awards, the expansion Chains of Promathia received a nomination for "Massively Multiplayer/Persistent World Game of the Year", ultimately losing out to World of Warcraft. During the following year's awards ceremony, The Vana'diel Collection received a nomination for "Massively Multiplayer Game of the Year". Final Fantasy XI was referenced in the online game Minna no Golf Online in the form of a Final Fantasy XI-themed lobby.

Square Enix released the second MMORPG in the series in 2010, titled Final Fantasy XIV Online. The original version received generally unfavorable reviews, and the new version, Final Fantasy XIV: A Realm Reborn, was released in 2013. Dawntrail, the fifth expansion pack for Final Fantasy XIV, released in 2024, introduced a crossover raid series with Final Fantasy XI titled Echoes of Vana'diel.

The game has spawned several written adaptations and related merchandise. Starting in 2003, a series of Final Fantasy XI novels was written by Miyabi Hasegawa and released in Japanese, German, and French. Additionally, in 2004, Adventure Log, a webcomic by Scott Ramsoomair, was commissioned by Square Enix starting in 2007. Final Fantasy XI PlayOnline Visa and MasterCard credit cards were available in Japan, with features including no annual fees as long as cardholders remain PlayOnline subscribers and various other rewards. There have also been posters with limited edition phone cards and keychains released, also exclusively in Japan. Several T-shirts have been made available for order in North America, and various stuffed animals and gashapon figurines have also been made available to order of different races from the series. A Vana'diel clock which displayed the in-game time was also marketed, as well as CDs of the game's music.

== See also ==
- List of Square Enix video game franchises
