= Final Fantasy: Unlimited =

2001–2002 Japanese anime series

- Title card of the series

ファイナルファンタジー:アンリミテッド (Fainaru Fantajī: Anrimiteddo)
- Genre: Adventure, fantasy, romance
- Created by: Square; Akitoshi Kawazu (series concept)
- Anime television series
- Directed by: Mahiro Maeda; Kenichi Takeuchi (assistant)
- Produced by: Makiko Iwata; Takeshi Sasamura; Shinji Nakashima; Yuma Sakata
- Written by: Atsuhiro Tomioka
- Music by: Akifumi Tada; Shirō Hamaguchi
- Studio: Gonzo
- Licensed by: AUS: Madman Entertainment; NA: ADV Films; UK: ADV Films UK
- Original network: TV Tokyo
- English network: NA: Anime Network; SEA: Animax Asia; US: Syfy; ZA: Animax
- Original run: 2 October 2001 – 26 March 2002
- Episodes: 25

Final Fantasy: Unlimited (Note: Japanese: FF:U ～ファイナルファンタジー:アンリミテッド ～, Hepburn: FF:U ~Fainaru Fantajī: Anrimiteddo~) (FF:U) is an anime television series based on Square Enix's popular Final Fantasy role-playing video game franchise. Produced by Gonzo, avex mode, TV Tokyo, Dentsu and GDH, the series was directed by Mahiro Maeda, with Atsuhiro Tomioka writing the scripts, Kazuto Nakazawa and Camel 7 designing the characters and Shirō Hamaguchi and Akifumi Tada composing the music. The TV series incorporates both 2D animation and 3D graphics, and takes elements from the Final Fantasy games. It was licensed for North America and the United Kingdom by ADV Films were released on DVD. Square Enix game designer Akitoshi Kawazu served as base concept planning and was intended to be the director for the planned video game series.

Due to a combination of low ratings and the financial failure of Final Fantasy: The Spirits Within, the anime series's planned 52-episode run was cut to 25, leaving the story unfinished. The continuation of the story has been released in a variety of other media including printed and web novel series, manga, radio dramas, and video games.

== Plot ==
FF:U follows the story of Ai and Yu Hayakawa, 12-year-old twins who travel into Wonderland, a mysterious parallel dimension, in search of their missing parents. Other main characters include Lisa Pacifist, a 22-year-old woman whom Ai and Yu encounter in the Subway as she becomes their protector while helping them search for their parents in Wonderland. The series is divided into two major sections, defined by the main method of transport the protagonists are utilizing. The first section of the series sees the group using the Ghost Train to reach a part of Wonderland, crossing paths with Kaze as he has no memory of his past save Makenshi, who aids the Lords of Gaudium who attack them. The group also encounter fragments of a destructive being named Omega, which is after the Ghost Train's power source to become whole. Meanwhile, the story from the antagonist's view is periodically revealed with Earl Tyrant's discussion with his lords. Earl is the embodiment of Chaos and is seeking the fragments of Omega to possess a power equal to the Unlimited, beings of immense power like Kaze and Makenshi who could destroy him.

The second section of the series sees the protagonists join up with the rebel faction, the Comodeen, and board the submarine, Jane, which is bound for Telos, the only place in Wonderland that has a natural deposit of the gravity-defying Flying Water. Both parties sought the substance: the Comodeen to power their airship Silvia to reach Earl's flying fortress Gaudium and the Earl's forces using the substance to contain Omega's power. The series climaxes when the Earl himself makes a move on the Comodeen, destroying Jane and capturing the protagonists in his true form: Chaos Tyrant. It was then that the Earl's right-hand man, Oscha, reveals that Ai and Yu were spawned from Chaos in the aftermath of Kaze and Makenshi's sending their adoptive parents to Wonderland. With only Omega's heart, Clear, remaining and fused with his Flying Water suit into a crystal, the Earl intended to absorb the Hayakawa twins as well to increase Chaos's power from their experiences. Luckily, Lou Lupus and Moogle come to their friends' aid as the Earl killed the former. Confronted with Chaos Tyrant, Kaze and Makenshi sacrifice themselves to destroy the Earl, thus ending his reign of terror over Wonderland while Lisa and the Hayakawa family were found by the Comodeen. They are also two mysterious figures that the group encounter, "Black Wind" (黒き風, Kuroki Kaze) and Makenshi (魔剣士), beings of incredible power who each lost their world before coming to Wonderland.

== Characters ==
Character	Japanese voice actor	English dubbing actor
Ai Hayakawa (アイ・ハヤカワ)	Haruko Momoi	Jessica Schwartz
Yu Hayakawa (ユウ・ハヤカワ)	Yuka Imai	Evan Slack
Lisa Pacifist (リサ・パツィフィースト)	Kyoko Hikami	Shawn Sides
Kaze (風; lit. Wind)	Nobutoshi Canna	James Brownlee
Chobi (チョビ)	Akiko Yajima	Samantha Inoue-Harte
Cactuar	Etsuko Kozakura	Samantha Inoue-Harte
Chocobo	Ako Mayama	Samantha Inoue-Harte
Crux (クルクス)	Kikuko Inoue	Samantha Inoue-Harte
Fabula (ファーブラ)	Kikuko Inoue	Claire Hamilton
Oscha (オスカー)	Kōji Ishii	Brian Jepson
Moogle Kupo	Tomoe Hanba	Bill Wise
Cid (シド)	Toshihiko Seki	Robert Newell
Fungus (フングス)	Daisuke Gōri	Grant James
Kumo (雲; lit.Cloud)	Akira Ishida	J. Shannon Weaver
Madoushi (魔道士)	Hideyuki Tanaka	David Stokey
Pist (ピスト)	Takehito Koyasu	Edwin Neal

== Production and release ==
FF:U was directed by Mahiro Maeda of GONZO and produced by TV Tokyo's Keisuke Iwata, and Square Enix's Kensuke Tanaka. Square Enix game designer Akitoshi Kawazu served as base concept planning. A series of video games were intended with Kawazu as director. Due to a combination of low ratings and the financial failure of Final Fantasy: The Spirits Within, the anime series's planned 52-episode run was cut to 25, leaving the story unfinished. FF:U aired on TV Tokyo's Network 6 on weekly on Tuesday 6:30 pm starting on October 2, 2001. Japan released the series for home media via DVD and divided it into nine separate releases, known as "Phases". ADV Films picked up the series for North America and United Kingdom on May 1, 2003. The North American complete boxset re-arranges the series into five discs of five episodes each, titled "Phase 1" through "Phase 5". A European complete boxset retains the seven discs as released singularly. Both were released by A.D.V. Films. A promotional DVD titled Final Fantasy: Unlimited Prologue Phase.0 was released containing the history of Final Fantasy, the production history of FF:U and interviews with the cast. It was released on January 30, 2002.

No.	Title	Directed by	Written by	Original release date	Ref.
1	"Wonderland: Journey into the Darkness"; Transliteration: "Ikai: Yami e no Tabidachi" (Japanese: 異界 -やみへのたびだち-)	Kenichi Takeuchi	Atsuhiro Tomioka	October 2, 2001	
2	"Magun: Man of the Black Wind"; Transliteration: "Magan: Kuroki Kaze no Otoko" (Japanese: 魔銃 -くろきかぜのおとこ-)	Ryūtarō Nakamura	Atsuhiro Tomioka	October 9, 2001	
3	"Fruit: The Town of Sweet Scent"; Transliteration: "Kajitsu: Amai Kaori no Machi" (Japanese: 果実 -あまいかおりのまち-)	Yūzō Wada	Atsuhiro Tomioka	October 16, 2001	
4	"Makenshi: The White Etude"; Transliteration: "Makenshi: Shiroki Echūdo" (Japanese: 魔剣士 -しろきエチュード-)	Minoru Ōhara	Atsuhiro Tomioka	October 23, 2001	
5	"Cid: The Adventure of the Underground Waterway"; Transliteration: "Shido: Chikasuimyaku no Bousen" (Japanese: シド -ちかすいみゃくのぼうけん-)	Junichi Watanabe	Kiyoko Yoshimura	October 30, 2001	
6	"Kigen Arts: The Saviour of Souls"; Transliteration: "Kigenjutsu: Inochi Mamorumono" (Japanese: 氣現術 -いのちまもるもの-)	Tōru Yoshida	Kazuhiro Satō	November 5, 2001	
7	"Subway: Enemy of the Dimensional Tunnel"; Transliteration: "Chikatetsu: Jigen Tonneru no Teki" (Japanese: 地下鉄 -じげんトンネルのてき-)	Makoto Kimura	Atsuhiro Tomioka	November 12, 2001	
8	"Soil: The Heart of the Magun"; Transliteration: "Soiru: Magan no Shinzō" (Japanese: ソイル -マガンのしんぞう-)	Yoshikazu Miyao	Kiyoko Yoshimura	November 19, 2001	
9	"Oscha: The Endless Project"; Transliteration: "Osukā: Owarinaki Shigoto" (Japanese: オスカー -おわりなきしごと-)	Yūzō Wada	Atsuhiro Tomioka	November 26, 2001	
10	"Mansion: The Memory of Sagiso"; Transliteration: "Yashiki: Sagisō no Omoide" (Japanese: 屋敷 -サギソウのおもいで-)	Tōru Yoshida	Kazuhiro Satō	December 8, 2001	
11	"Ciel: The Departure of Chocobo"; Transliteration: "Shieru: Chokobo to no Wakare" (Japanese: シエル -チョコボとのわかれ-)	Hirokazu Yamada	Kiyoko Yoshimura	December 15, 2001	
12	"Fungus: Eternal Life"; Transliteration: "Fungusu: Eien no Inochi" (Japanese: フングス -えいえんのいのち-)	Kōbun Shizuno	Atsuhiro Tomioka	December 22, 2001	
13	"Meteor: Abominable Memory"; Transliteration: "Meteo: Imawashiki Kioku" (Japanese: メテオ -いまわしききおく-)	Kenichi Takeuchi	Atsuhiro Tomioka	December 29, 2001	
14	"Omega: Reunion and Departure"; Transliteration: "Omega: Saikai to Tabidachi" (Japanese: オメガ -さいかいとたびだち-)	Makoto Kimura	Atsuhiro Tomioka	January 8, 2002	
15	"Jane: The Moving Ocean Puzzle"; Transliteration: "Jēn: Ugokidasu Umi Pazuru" (Japanese: ジェーン -うごきだすうみパズル-)	Tomio Yamauchi	Shūichi Kōyama	January 15, 2002	
16	"Kigen Dragon: Behind the Smile"; Transliteration: "Kigenjū: Egao no Mukō ni" (Japanese: 氣現獣 -えがおのむこうに-)	Azumi Matsumura	Atsuhiro Tomioka	January 22, 2002	
17	"Frog: The Smallest Great Adventure"; Transliteration: "Kaeru: Chicchana Daibōken" (Japanese: カエル -ちっちゃなだいぼうけん-)	Kiyoko Sayama	Kiyoko Yoshimura	January 29, 2002	
18	"Madoushi: The Battle of Kiri and Kumo"; Transliteration: "Madōshi: Kiri to Kumo no Taiketsu" (Japanese: 魔道士 -きりとくものたいけつ-)	Tomohiro Hirata	Kazuhiro Satō	February 5, 2002	
19	"Ai: Meeting with Clear"; Transliteration: "Ai: Kuria to no Deai" (Japanese: アイ -クリアとのであい-)	Yū Kō	Atsuhiro Tomioka	February 12, 2002	
20	"Yu: The Secret of Gaudium"; Transliteration: "Yū: Gaudiumu no Himitsu" (Japanese: ユウ -ガウディウムのひみつ-)	Tōru Yoshida	Atsuhiro Tomioka	February 19, 2002	
21	"Cactus: The Wandering Sea"; Transliteration: "Saboten: Samayoeru Umi" (Japanese: サボテン -さまよえるうみ-)	Makoto Kimura	Kiyoko Yoshimura	February 26, 2002	
22	"Moogle: Long Lost Memories"; Transliteration: "Mōguri: Natsukashī Omoide" (Japanese: モーグリ -なつかしいおもいで-)	Junichi Watanabe	Shūichi Kōyama	March 5, 2002	
23	"Teros: In Search of Flying Water"; Transliteration: "Terosu: Tobimizu o Mezashite" (Japanese: テロス -とびみずをめざして-)	Hiroshi Haraguchi	Atsuhiro Tomioka	March 12, 2002	
24	"Chaos: The Earl Unveiled"; Transliteration: "Konton: Hakushaku no Shōtai" (Japanese: 混沌 -はくしゃくのしょうたい-)	Kunihiro Mori	Atsuhiro Tomioka	March 19, 2002	
25	"Kaze: The Glory of Life"; Transliteration: "Kaze: Inochi Kagayaku Toki" (Japanese: 風 -いのちかがやくとき-)	Yoshimasa Hiraike	Atsuhiro Tomioka	March 26, 2002	

== Music ==
FF:U was composed by Nobuo Uematsu, Shirō Hamaguchi, and Akifumi Tada. The series has an opening theme and three ending themes. The opening theme for the series is "Over the FANTASY" (Composed by Nobuo Uematsu, Arranged by Takahiro Ando, Lyrics by Yuko Ebine) performed by Kana Ueda. The first theme is "VIVID" (Lyrics and Composition by Takashi Genouzono, Arrangements by Fairy Fore and Masao Akashi) performed by Fairy Fore and was used for episodes 1-13. For episodes 14-24 the ending theme was "Romancing Train" (Composition and arrangements by t-kimura, lyrics by motsu) performed by move. The third ending theme was "Over the FANTASY" and was used on the final episode of the series.

Avex mode released the singles for the opening and endings. The "VIVID" single was released on November 7, 2001. The "Over the FANTASY" single was released on December 5, 2001. The single for "Romance Train" was released on February 6, 2002. Two soundtracks were produced by Avex mode. The first is Final Fantasy: Unlimited Music Adventure Verse.1 (Note: FF:U ～ファイナルファンタジー：アンリミテッド～ MUSIC ADVENTURE Verse. 1) and was released December 19, 2001. The second titled Final Fantasy: Unlimited Music Adventure Verse.2 (Note: FF:U ～ファイナルファンタジー：アンリミテッド～ MUSIC ADVENTURE Verse. 2) was released on April 17, 2002.

Final Fantasy: Unlimited Music Adventure Verse 1
No.	Title	Music	Arrangement	Length
1.	"Top Title" (トップタイトル)	Nobuo Uematsu		0:15
2.	"Ai's Theme" (アイのテーマ)			2:02
3.	"Mysterious Boy, Fungo" (謎の少年ファンゴ)			1:16
4.	"Yu's Theme" (ユウのテーマ)			1:58
5.	"A little courage" (少しの勇気)			1:21
6.	"The endless road..." (道はどこまでも…)			1:43
7.	"Subtitle" (サブタイトル)			0:11
8.	"Enter, Kaze." (風、登場。)			1:12
9.	"Difficult battle" (苦戦)			1:28
10.	"Silent wind" (沈黙の風)	Nobuo Uematsu		1:19
11.	"Departing wind" (去りゆく風)	Nobuo Uematsu		1:21
12.	"The Magun has Thawed" (魔銃解凍)			1:25
13.	"Firing of the Magun" (魔銃発射)			1:10
14.	"Preview" (予告)	Nobuo Uematsu		0:35
15.	"Enter monster" (モンスター登場)	Akifumi Tada	Akifumi Tada	1:27
16.	"Trampled by the monster" (モンスター蹂躙)	Akifumi Tada	Akifumi Tada	1:23
17.	"Colossal Fortress Gaudium" (巨大要塞ガウディウム)			1:09
18.	"Tyrant's dinner table" (タイラントの食卓)			1:52
19.	"Unseen anxiety" (見えない不安)			1:35
20.	"Strange feeling" (ふしぎな気分)			1:12
21.	"Subway" (地下鉄)			1:52
22.	"Fabula's mansion" (ファーブラの館)			1:13
23.	"The absurd world" (不条理な世界)			1:08
24.	"Chocobo will walk, no matter how far" (チョコボは歩くよ、どこまでも)	Kazuhiko Sawaguchi	Kazuhiko Sawaguchi	1:12
25.	"Get out of here ~" (逃げろ～)	Kazuhiko Sawaguchi	Kazuhiko Sawaguchi	1:12
26.	"Emergence of an alternate world" (異界出現)			1:10
27.	"Summoning the beast's return" (召還獣降臨)			1:56
28.	"City of fruit" (果実の街)	Akifumi Tada	Akifumi Tada	2:07
29.	"Nihilistic world" (虚無の世界)	Akifumi Tada	Akifumi Tada	1:35
30.	"Cid the genius scientist" (天才科学者シド)	Akifumi Tada	Akifumi Tada	1:39
31.	"The hearts that touch" (ふれあう心)	Nobuo Uematsu		1:33
32.	"Recollections of Lisa" (追憶のリサ)	Nobuo Uematsu		1:20
Total length:				44:08

Final Fantasy: Unlimited Music Adventure Verse 2
No.	Title	Lyrics	Music	Arrangement	Length
1.	"Prayer: Lisa" (祈り－リサ)		Nobuo Uematsu		1:17
2.	"Home Town: Kaze" (故郷－風)		Nobuo Uematsu	Akifumi Tada	0:55
3.	"Recollection: Kaze" (記憶－風)		Nobuo Uematsu		0:58
4.	"Over the FANTASY (TV Size)" (「Over the FANTASY」TVサイズ)	Yuko Mantenne	Nobuo Uematsu	Takahiro Ando	1:38
5.	"Underwater Voyage" (潜航艇)				1:21
6.	"The Ocean Puzzle" (海パズル)		Akifumi Tada	Akifumi Tada	2:42
7.	"Reminiscence: Ai and Yu" (追憶－アイとユウ)				1:38
8.	"Peace~Hard Fight: Ai and Yu" (平和～苦戦－アイとユウ)				3:02
9.	"Hard Fight: Lisa" (苦戦－リサ)				2:03
10.	"Kigen Dragon" (氣現獣)		Akifumi Tada	Akifumi Tada	1:09
11.	"Comodeen" (コモディーン)				2:11
12.	"Miles" (ミィレス)				1:32
13.	"Cid" (シド)		Akifumi Tada	Akifumi Tada	3:35
14.	"Cactuar" (サボテンダー)		Akifumi Tada	Akifumi Tada	2:30
15.	"Lou" (ルー)				1:20
16.	"Transformation: Lou" (変身－ルー)				2:25
17.	"Moogle" (モーグリ)		Akifumi Tada	Akifumi Tada	1:07
18.	"Chocobo" (チョコボ)		Nobuo Uematsu	Kazuhiko Sawaguchi	2:58
19.	"Ciel Chocobo" (シエルチョコボ)		Nobuo Uematsu	Akifumi Tada	1:34
20.	"VIVID (TV Size)" (「VIVID」TVサイズ)	Takashi Ozono	Takashi Ozono	FAIRY FORE & Masao Akiishi	1:31
21.	"Fungus" (フングス)				1:23
22.	"Herba" (ヘルバ)				1:38
23.	"Pist" (ピスト)				1:47
24.	"Oscha" (オスカー)				1:52
25.	"Formidable Enemy" (強敵)				3:51
26.	"Run!" (逃げろ！)		Akifumi Tada	Akifumi Tada	1:15
27.	"Omega" (オメガ)				1:30
28.	"Shotgun Kaze" (ショットガン－風)		Akifumi Tada	Akifumi Tada	1:38
29.	"Makenshi" (魔剣士)				1:52
30.	"Sword Dragon" (一刀獣)		Akifumi Tada	Akifumi Tada	1:57
31.	"Demon Sword" (魔剣)		Akifumi Tada	Akifumi Tada	1:22
32.	"Death" (死)		Akifumi Tada	Akifumi Tada	2:35
33.	"Battle to the Death" (死闘)				2:10
34.	"Phoenix" (フェニックス)				0:42
35.	"Victory" (勝利)		Nobuo Uematsu		0:13
36.	"Airborne Assault" (勝利)				1:31
37.	"Romancing Train (TV Size)" (「Romancing Train」TVサイズ)	motsu	t-kimura	t-kimura	1:43
Total length:					1:06:41

== Related media ==
=== Printed ===
A novel titled, Final Fantasy: Unlimited – Sou no Kizuna (Note: ファイナルファンタジー:アンリミテッド―双の絆; lit. "Final Fantasy Unlimited – The Bond of Two Souls") was released on March 28, 2002, by Kadokawa Shoten. The novel was written by Sho Katigiri, illustrated by Kazuto Nakazawa, and supervised by Squaresoft. It explores a side story that is set in the time of the television series. A 96-page artbook titled Final Fantasy: Unlimited – Kaze to Kumo Noita Sekai (Note: ファイナル ファンタジー・アンリミテッド －風と雲のいた世界－; lit. "Final Fantasy: Unlimited – The World with Wind and Clouds") was published by Kadokawa Shoten and released on April 22, 2002. A book titled FF:U After – Gakai no Sho (Note: FF:U After ~外界の章~; lit."FF:U After – Chapters of the Outside World") was released on May 15, 2002, by DigiCube. The book contains a 32-page manga drawn by Hiroyuki Yamashita and a 120-page script written by Atsuhiro Tomioka. It covers the twins' return to their own world, the revelation of Lisa's past, and introduces a new villain under Gaudium: Soljashy. A serial web novel titled FF:U After Spiral was written by Sho Katigiri, supervised by Atsuhiro Tomioka, and was published on the official Japanese FF:U website. The series has a total of seven chapters and one spin-off chapter were released and take place after the events of FF:U After.

=== Audio ===
A serial audio drama titled FF:U Voice Theater – fābura no ikai e no sasoi (Note: FF:U ヴォイスシアター「ファーブラの異界への誘い」; lit."FF:U Voice Theater – Fabula's Invitation to the Other World") was available for those who subscribed to TV Tokyo's Anime-X service via mobile phones on i-mode's distribution service. A total of 10 episodes were released monthly beginning on January 15, 2002. It was conducted by Yoshitomo Yonetani with Kikuko Inoue returning as Fabula's voice actress. The series was compiled and released on September 30 the same year in CD-ROM for Windows 95, 98, Me, 2000, XP, and iMac G3. Two drama CDs were released by Avex mode. The first drama CD titled FF:U Before - Aura Inochi Tsugu Mono (Note: FF:U Before ～アウラ いのちつぐもの～; lit. "FF:U Before – The Life of Aura") was given to customers for a limited time as a gift for those who purchased the DVD Boxset. It tells a story in the form of a flashback of the destruction of Kaze and Makenshi's worlds. A radio drama titled FF:U After 2 – Risa tachi kira reta kusari (Note: FF:U After 2-リサ た ちきられたクサリ-; lit. "Lisa bests Kusari") was released on December 26, 2002, and deals with Comodeen's final attack on Gaudium and brings a conclusion to the conflict between Lisa and Soljashy.

=== Video games ===
Two video games have been released. The first, titled FF:U with U, is an RPG video game adaptation for Japanese mobile phones on i-mode's distribution service developed by Index was released on August 20, 2002. The game contains the same plot as the anime. Points were accumulated by playing through the game's scenarios and used to purchase more characters. Ringtones based on the music of FF:U could be purchased through the game as microtransactions. The second game, titled FF:U on PC Meikyū – Kuroki Yume Noki Oku (Note: FF:U on PC 迷宮 くろきゆめのきおく, lit.FF:U on PC Labyrinth - Black Dream Memories), is a visual novel and card game set in the FF:U universe. Published by Amada Printing, it was released May 16, 2003. Unlimited Saga was in production around the same time as the anime and originally connected to the setting of the anime series, but these plans were shelved during production. Kawazu later said that many of the similarities were coincidental due to his work on both projects.

== Reception ==
Reviewer	Score
Anime News Network	B(DVD 1, Phase 1); D+(DVD 2, Phase 2)
Mania.com	D(complete collection)
Play	C+
T.H.E.M.	3/5 stars

The series was ranked 18 by popular vote for Top 20 Anime in Japan for November 2001. Outside Japan, the series had received mixed reviews. Play magazine reviewer David Halverson was disappointed that the series was aimed at a younger audience. Allen Divers of Anime News Network ranked the series an overall score "B"; although he considered the plot "somewhat" formulaic, he felt that the series has an ambition and that manages to be visually engaging. Sandra Scholes of Active Anime praised the series, saying that the characters were created with care and consideration for the fans who have followed Final Fantasy series from the start. Ken Hargon of Anime News Network criticized the series for being unappealing and not living up to the Final Fantasy series nor any other anime. Carlos Ross of T.H.E.M. ranked the series three stars stating that "the style is firmly entrenched in Saturday morning", but considered better than Final Fantasy: Legend of the Crystals. Paul Gaudette of Mania.com gave the series a "D" rating, saying that despite not having to do with its namesake, he called Final Fantasy Unlimited somewhat enjoyable in the beginning while noticing that the show was written for a younger audience.
