= Final Fantasy =

Japanese media franchise

- Wordmark used in the individual logos since 1991
- Created by: Hironobu Sakaguchi
- Original work: Final Fantasy
- Owner: Square Enix
- Years: 1987-present

Print publications
- Books: See List of Final Fantasy media § Novels and manga

Films and television
- Films: See List of Final Fantasy media § Film and television
- Animated series: See List of Final Fantasy media § Film and television

Games
- Traditional: Final Fantasy Trading Card Game
- Video games: See List of Final Fantasy video games

Audio
- Original music: See List of Final Fantasy media § Soundtracks

Final Fantasy (Note: Japanese: ファイナルファンタジー, Hepburn: Fainaru Fantajī) is a Japanese science fantasy media franchise created by Hironobu Sakaguchi which is owned, developed, and published by Square Enix (formerly Square). The franchise centers on a series of fantasy role-playing video games; however, it has branched into other video game genres, such as action role-playing, massively multiplayer online role-playing, third-person shooter, and rhythm. The first game in the series was released in 1987 and was followed by a sequel with thematic similarities the next year. The franchise has since expanded to sixteen main games with several spin-offs and direct sequels, as well as related stories in other media: films, anime, manga, and novels.

Final Fantasy is mostly an anthology series with primary installments being standalone role-playing games, each with different settings, plots and main characters, but the franchise is linked by several recurring elements, including game mechanics and recurring character names. Each plot centers on a particular group of heroes who are battling a great evil, but also explores the characters' internal struggles and relationships. Character names are frequently derived from the history, languages, pop culture, and mythologies of cultures worldwide. The mechanics of each game involve similar battle systems and maps.

Final Fantasy has been both critically and commercially successful. Several entries are regarded as some of the greatest video games of all time, with the series selling more than 200 million copies worldwide, making it one of the best-selling video game franchises of all time. The series is well known for its innovation, cutting-edge visuals such as the inclusion of full-motion videos and photorealistic character models, and music by the likes of Nobuo Uematsu. It has popularized many features now common in role-playing games, also popularizing the genre as a whole in markets outside Japan.

== Media ==
=== Games ===
The first installment of the series was released in Japan on December 18, 1987. Successive games are numbered as volumes rather than sequels; subsequent games have stories unrelated to previous ones. Many Final Fantasy games have been localized for markets in North America, Europe, and Australia on numerous video game consoles, personal computers (PC), and mobile phones. As of June 2023, the series includes the main installments from Final Fantasy to Final Fantasy XVI, as well as direct sequels and spin-offs, both released and confirmed as being in development. Many of the early games have been remade or re-released on multiple platforms.

==== Main series ====
Main series release timeline
1987	Final Fantasy
1988	Final Fantasy II
1989
1990	Final Fantasy III
1991	Final Fantasy IV
1992	Final Fantasy V
1993
1994	Final Fantasy VI
1995–1996
1997	Final Fantasy VII
1998
1999	Final Fantasy VIII
2000	Final Fantasy IX
2001	Final Fantasy X
2002	Final Fantasy XI
2003–2005
2006	Final Fantasy XII
2007–2008
2009	Final Fantasy XIII
2010	Final Fantasy XIV (original)
2011–2012
2013	Final Fantasy XIV (reboot)
2014–2015
2016	Final Fantasy XV
2017–2022
2023	Final Fantasy XVI

Three Final Fantasy installments were released on the Nintendo Entertainment System (NES). Final Fantasy was released in Japan in 1987 and in North America in 1990. It introduced many concepts to the console RPG genre, and has since been remade on several platforms. Final Fantasy II, released in 1988 in Japan, has been bundled with Final Fantasy in several re-releases. The last of the NES installments, Final Fantasy III, was released in Japan in 1990; it remained exclusive to the country until a Nintendo DS remake was published worldwide starting in 2006.

The Super Nintendo Entertainment System (SNES) also featured three installments of the main series, all of which have been re-released on several platforms. Final Fantasy IV was released in 1991; it was published in North America as Final Fantasy II. It introduced the "Active Time Battle" system. Final Fantasy V, released in 1992 in Japan, was the first game in the series to spawn a sequel: a short anime series, Final Fantasy: Legend of the Crystals. Final Fantasy VI was released in Japan in 1994, titled Final Fantasy III in North America.

The PlayStation console saw the release of three main Final Fantasy games. In 1997, Final Fantasy VII moved away from the two-dimensional (2D) graphics used in previous games to three-dimensional (3D) computer graphics; it features polygonal characters on pre-rendered backgrounds. Final Fantasy VII also introduced a more modern setting, a style that was carried over to the next game. It was also the second in the series to be released in Europe, with the first being Final Fantasy Mystic Quest. Final Fantasy VIII was published in 1999 and was the first to consistently use realistically proportioned characters and feature a vocal piece as its theme music. Final Fantasy IX, released in 2000, returned to the series' roots, by revisiting a more traditional Final Fantasy setting, rather than the more modern worlds of VII and VIII.

Three main installments were published for the PlayStation 2 (PS2). Final Fantasy X (2001) introduced full 3D areas and voice acting to the series, and was the first to spawn a sub-sequel (Final Fantasy X-2, published in 2003). The first massively multiplayer online role-playing game (MMORPG) in the series, Final Fantasy XI, was released on the PS2 and PC in 2002, and later on the Xbox 360. It introduced real-time battles instead of random encounters. Final Fantasy XII, published in 2006, also includes real-time battles in large, interconnected playfields. The game is also the first in the main series to utilize a world used in a previous game, namely the land of Ivalice, which was previously featured in Final Fantasy Tactics and Vagrant Story.

In 2009, Final Fantasy XIII was released in Japan, and in North America and Europe the following year, for PlayStation 3 and Xbox 360. It is the flagship installment of the Fabula Nova Crystallis Final Fantasy series and became the first mainline game to spawn two sub-sequels (XIII-2 and Lightning Returns). It was also the first game released in Chinese and high definition along with being released on two consoles at once. Final Fantasy XIV, a MMORPG, was released worldwide on Microsoft Windows in 2010, but it received heavy criticism when it was launched, prompting Square Enix to rerelease the game as Final Fantasy XIV: A Realm Reborn, this time to the PlayStation 3 as well, in 2013. Final Fantasy XV is an action role-playing game that was released for PlayStation 4 and Xbox One in 2016. Originally a XIII spin-off titled Versus XIII, XV uses the mythos of the Fabula Nova Crystallis series, although in many other respects the game stands on its own and has since been distanced from the series by its developers. (Note: Citations:) The sixteenth mainline entry, Final Fantasy XVI, was released in 2023 for PlayStation 5.

==== Remakes, sequels and spin-offs ====
Final Fantasy has spawned numerous spin-offs and metaseries. Several are, in fact, not Final Fantasy games, but were rebranded for North American release. Examples include the SaGa series, rebranded The Final Fantasy Legend, and its two sequels, Final Fantasy Legend II and III. Final Fantasy Mystic Quest was specifically developed for a United States audience, and Final Fantasy Tactics is a tactical RPG that features many references and themes found in the series.

The spin-off Chocobo series, Crystal Chronicles series, and Kingdom Hearts series also include multiple Final Fantasy elements. Dissidia Final Fantasy was released in 2009, a fighting game that features heroes and villains from the first ten games of the main series. It was followed by a prequel in 2011, a sequel in 2015 and a mobile spin-off in 2017.

In 2003, the Final Fantasy series' first sub-sequel, Final Fantasy X-2, was released. Final Fantasy XIII was originally intended to stand on its own, but the team wanted to explore the world, characters and mythos more, resulting in the development and release of two sequels in 2011 and 2013 respectively, creating the series' first official trilogy. Other spin-offs have taken the form of subseries—Compilation of Final Fantasy VII, Ivalice Alliance, and Fabula Nova Crystallis Final Fantasy.

In 2022, Square Enix released an action-role playing game, Stranger of Paradise: Final Fantasy Origin, that was developed in collaboration with Team Ninja. It takes place in an alternate, reimagined reality based on the original Final Fantasy game, depicting a prequel story that explores the origins of the antagonist Chaos and the emergence of the four Warriors of Light. Enhanced 3D remakes of Final Fantasy III and IV were released in 2006 and 2007 respectively. The first installment of the Final Fantasy VII Remake project was released on the PlayStation 4 in 2020. The second and latest installment of the remake trilogy, Final Fantasy VII Rebirth, was released on the PlayStation 5 in 2024.

=== Film and television ===
Final Fantasy in film and television
1994	Final Fantasy: Legend of the Crystals
1995–2000
2001	Final Fantasy: The Spirits Within
2001	Final Fantasy: Unlimited
2002–2004
2005	Final Fantasy VII: Advent Children
2005	Last Order: Final Fantasy VII
2006–2015
2016	Kingsglaive: Final Fantasy XV
2016	Brotherhood: Final Fantasy XV
2017	Final Fantasy XIV: Dad of Light
2018
2019	Final Fantasy XV: Episode Ardyn – Prologue

Square Enix has expanded the Final Fantasy series into various media. Multiple anime and computer-generated imagery (CGI) films have been produced that are based either on individual Final Fantasy games or on the series as a whole. The first was an original video animation (OVA), Final Fantasy: Legend of the Crystals, a sequel to Final Fantasy V set 200 years after the events of the game. The four 30-minute episodes were released in Japan in 1994 and later in the United States by Urban Vision in 1998. In 2001, Square Pictures released its first feature film, Final Fantasy: The Spirits Within, which is set on a future Earth invaded by alien life forms. The Spirits Within was the first animated feature to attempt to portray photorealistic CGI humans but was considered a box office bomb and garnered mixed reviews.

A 25-episode anime television series, Final Fantasy: Unlimited, was released in 2001 based on the common elements of the franchise. It was broadcast in Japan by TV Tokyo and released in North America by ADV Films. In 2005, Final Fantasy VII: Advent Children, a feature length direct-to-DVD CGI film, and Last Order: Final Fantasy VII, a non-canon OVA, were released as part of the Compilation of Final Fantasy VII. Advent Children was animated by Visual Works, which helped the company create CG sequences for the games. The film, unlike The Spirits Within, became a commercial success. Last Order, on the other hand, was released in Japan in a special DVD bundle package with Advent Children. Last Order sold out quickly and was positively received by Western critics, though fan reaction was mixed over changes to established story scenes.

Two animated tie-ins for Final Fantasy XV were released as part of a larger multimedia project dubbed the Final Fantasy XV Universe. Brotherhood is a series of five 10-to-20-minute-long episodes developed by A-1 Pictures and Square Enix detailing the backstories of the main cast. Kingsglaive, a CGI film released prior to the game in Summer 2016, is set during the game's opening and follows new and secondary characters. Square Enix released a short anime in 2019 called Final Fantasy XV: Episode Ardyn – Prologue on YouTube. Produced by Satelight Inc, it provides insight into the antagonist's past and background story for Final Fantasy XV's final DLC.

Square Enix released Final Fantasy XIV: Dad of Light in 2017, an 8-episode Japanese soap opera based, featuring a mix of live-action scenes and Final Fantasy XIV gameplay footage. Sony Pictures Television was working on a live-action adaptation of the series in June 2019 with Hivemind and Square Enix. Jason Brown, Sean Daniel, and Dinesh Shamdasani from Hivemind were producing while Ben Lustig and Jake Thornton were attached as writers and executive producers.

=== Other media ===
Several video games in the series have either been adapted into or had spin-offs in other media. The first was the novelization of Final Fantasy II in 1989, which was followed by a manga adaptation of Final Fantasy III in 1992. Later years have seen an increase in the number of adaptations and spin-offs outside video games. Final Fantasy: The Spirits Within has been adapted into a novel, Crystal Chronicles has been adapted into a manga, and Final Fantasy XI has a novel and manga set in its continuity. Square Enix released seven novellas based on the Final Fantasy VII universe. The Final Fantasy: Unlimited story was partially continued in novels and a manga after the anime series ended. The Final Fantasy XIII series has also been expanded with novellas. Final Fantasy Tactics Advance has been adapted into a radio drama, and Final Fantasy: Unlimited has received a radio drama sequel.

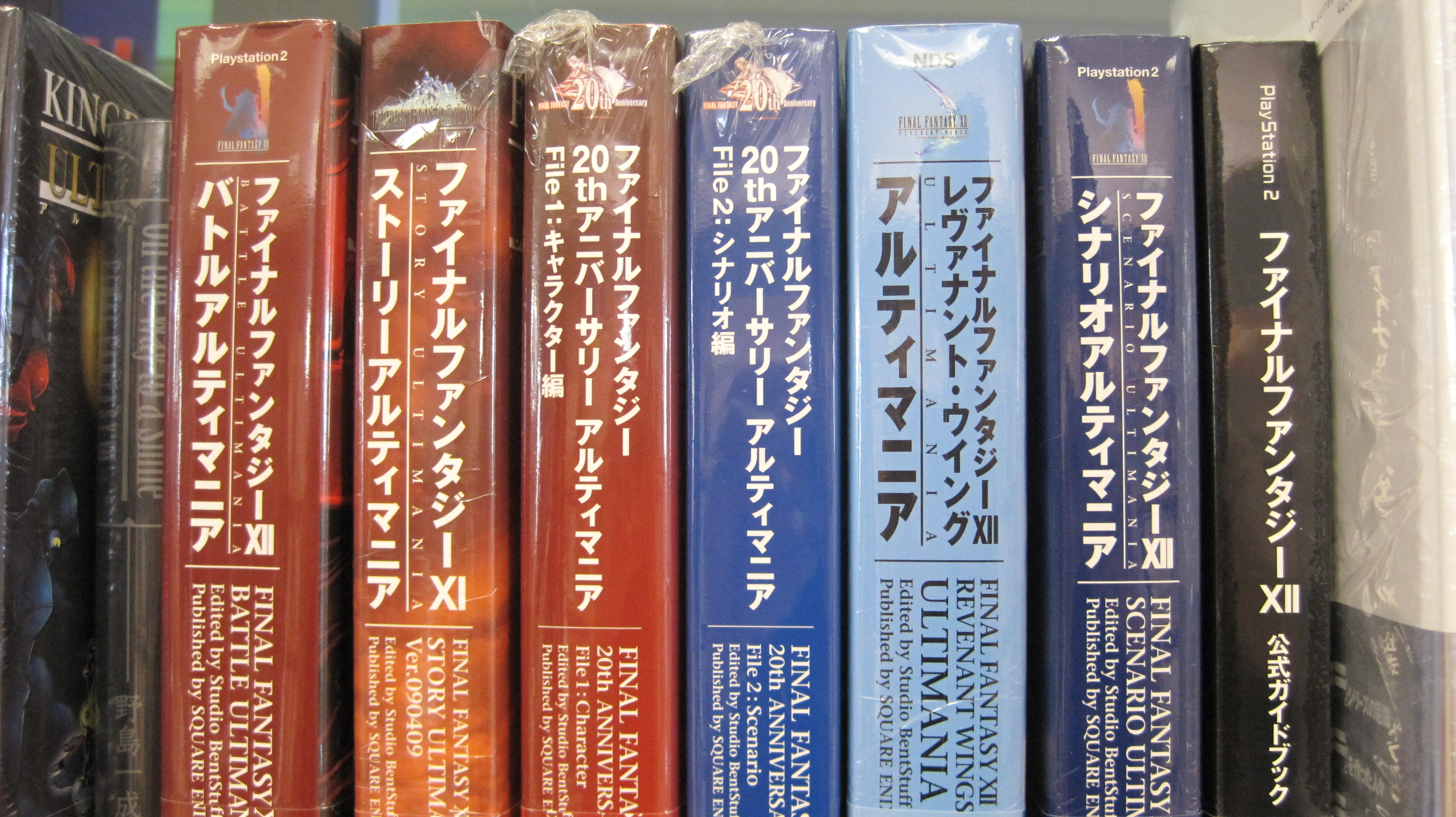
Square Enix has published companion books, known as Ultimania in Japan, for the individual games.

Many of the soundtracks have been released for sale. Numerous companion books, which often provide in-depth game information, have been published. Square published them in Japan as Ultimania books. A trading card game named Final Fantasy Trading Card Game is produced by Square Enix and Hobby Japan, first released Japan in 2012 with an English version in 2016. The game has been compared to Magic: the Gathering, and a tournament circuit for the game also takes place. In 2025, Wizards of the Coast released sets based on Final Fantasy—encompassing every mainline entry at the time—for Magic: The Gathering as part of its Universes Beyond collaborations.

== Common elements ==
Although most Final Fantasy installments are independent, many gameplay elements recur throughout the series. Most games contain elements of fantasy and science fiction and feature recycled names often inspired from various cultures' history, languages and mythology, including Asian, European, and Middle-Eastern. Examples include weapon names like Excalibur and Masamune—derived from Arthurian legend and the Japanese swordsmith Masamune, respectively—as well as the spell names Holy, Meteor, and Ultima. Beginning with Final Fantasy IV, the main series adopted its current logo style that features the same typeface and an emblem designed by Japanese artist Yoshitaka Amano. The emblem relates to a game's plot and typically portrays a character or object in the story. Subsequent remakes of the first three games have replaced the original logos with ones in the current style.

=== Plot and themes ===
The central conflict in many Final Fantasy games focuses on a group of characters battling an evil, and sometimes ancient, antagonist that dominates the world. Stories frequently involve a sovereign state in rebellion, with the protagonists taking part in the rebellion. The heroes are often destined to defeat the evil and occasionally gather as a direct result of the antagonist's malicious actions. Another series staple is the existence of two villains, with the main villain subservient to another character or entity that is introduced later. The main antagonist introduced at the beginning of the game is not always the final enemy, and the characters must continue their quest beyond what appears to be the final fight.

Stories in the series frequently emphasize the internal struggles, passions, and tragedies of the characters, and the main plot often recedes into the background as the focus shifts to their personal lives. Games also explore relationships between characters, ranging from love to rivalry. Recurring plot devices include amnesia, a hero corrupted by an evil force, mistaken identity, and self-sacrifice. Magical orbs and crystals are recurring in-game items that are frequently connected to the themes of the games' plots. Crystals often play a central role in the creation of the world, and a majority of the Final Fantasy games link crystals and orbs to the planet's life force. As such, control over these crystals drives the main conflict. The classical elements are also a recurring theme in the series related to the heroes, villains, and items. Other common plot and setting themes include the Gaia hypothesis, an apocalypse, and conflicts between advanced technology and nature.

=== Characters ===
The series has a number of recurring character archetypes. Most famously, every game since Final Fantasy II, including remakes of the first Final Fantasy, features a character named Cid. While Cid's appearance, personality, goals, and role in the game vary (non-playable ally, party member, villain, etc.), many versions are either a scientist or engineer and are tied in some way to an airship the party eventually acquires. Biggs and Wedge, inspired by two Star Wars characters, appear in numerous games as minor characters, sometimes as comic relief. The later games in the series feature several males with effeminate characteristics.

Recurring creatures include Chocobos, Moogles, and Cactuars. Chocobos are large, often flightless birds that appear in several installments as a means of long-distance travel for characters. Moogles are white, stout creatures resembling teddy bears with wings and a single antenna. They serve different roles in games including mail delivery, weaponsmiths, party members, and saving the game. Cactuars are anthropomorphic cacti with haniwa-like faces presented in a running or dashing pose. They usually appear as recurring enemy units, and also as summoned allies or friendly non-player characters in certain titles. Chocobo and Moogle appearances are often accompanied by specific musical themes that have been arranged differently for separate games.

=== Gameplay ===
In Final Fantasy games, players command a party of characters as they progress through the game's story by exploring the game world and defeating enemies. Enemies are typically encountered randomly through exploring, a trend which changed in Final Fantasy XI and XII. The player issues combat orders—like "Fight", "Magic", and "Item"—to individual characters via a menu-driven interface while engaging in battles. Throughout the series, the games have used different battle systems. Prior to Final Fantasy XI, battles were turn-based with the protagonists and antagonists on different sides of the battlefield. Final Fantasy IV introduced the "Active Time Battle" (ATB) system that augmented the turn-based nature with a perpetual time-keeping system. Designed by Hiroyuki Ito, it injected urgency and excitement into combat by requiring the player to act before an enemy attacks, and was used until Final Fantasy X, which implemented the "Conditional Turn-Based" (CTB) system. This new system returned to the previous turn-based system, but added nuances to offer players more challenge.

Final Fantasy XI adopted a real-time battle system where characters continuously act depending on the issued command. Final Fantasy XII continued this gameplay with the "Active Dimension Battle" system. Final Fantasy XIII's combat system, designed by the same man who worked on X, was meant to have an action-oriented feel, emulating the cinematic battles in Final Fantasy VII: Advent Children. Final Fantasy XV introduces a new "Open Combat" system (OCS). Unlike previous battle systems in the franchise, it provides a more fluid battle scenario that allows free range attacks and movement. This system also incorporates a "Tactical" Option during battle, which pauses active battle to allow use of items.

Like most RPGs, the Final Fantasy installments use an experience level system for character advancement, in which experience points are accumulated by killing enemies. Character classes, specific jobs that enable unique abilities for characters, are another recurring theme. Introduced in the first game, character classes have been used differently in each game. Some restrict a character to a single job to integrate it into the story, while others feature dynamic job systems that allow the player to choose from multiple classes and switch throughout the game. Though used heavily in many games, such systems have become less prevalent in favor of characters that are more versatile; characters still match an archetype but are able to learn skills outside their class.

Magic is another common RPG element in the series. While the method by which characters gain magic varies between installments, it is generally divided into classes organized by color: "White magic", which focuses on spells that assist teammates; "Black magic", which focuses on harming enemies; "Red magic", which is a combination of white and black magics, "Blue magic", which mimics enemy attacks; and "Green magic" which focuses on applying status effects to characters. Other types of magic frequently appear such as "Time magic", focusing on the themes of time, space, and gravity; and "Summoning magic", which evokes legendary creatures to aid in battle, a feature that has persisted since Final Fantasy III. Summoned creatures are often referred to by names like "Espers" or "Eidolons" and have been inspired by mythologies from Arabic, Hindu, Norse, and Greek cultures.

Different means of transportation have appeared through the series. The most common is the airship for long range travel and chocobos for traveling short distances. Various sea and land vessels have also appeared. Following Final Fantasy VII, vehicle designs became more modern and futuristic.

== Development and history ==
=== Origin ===
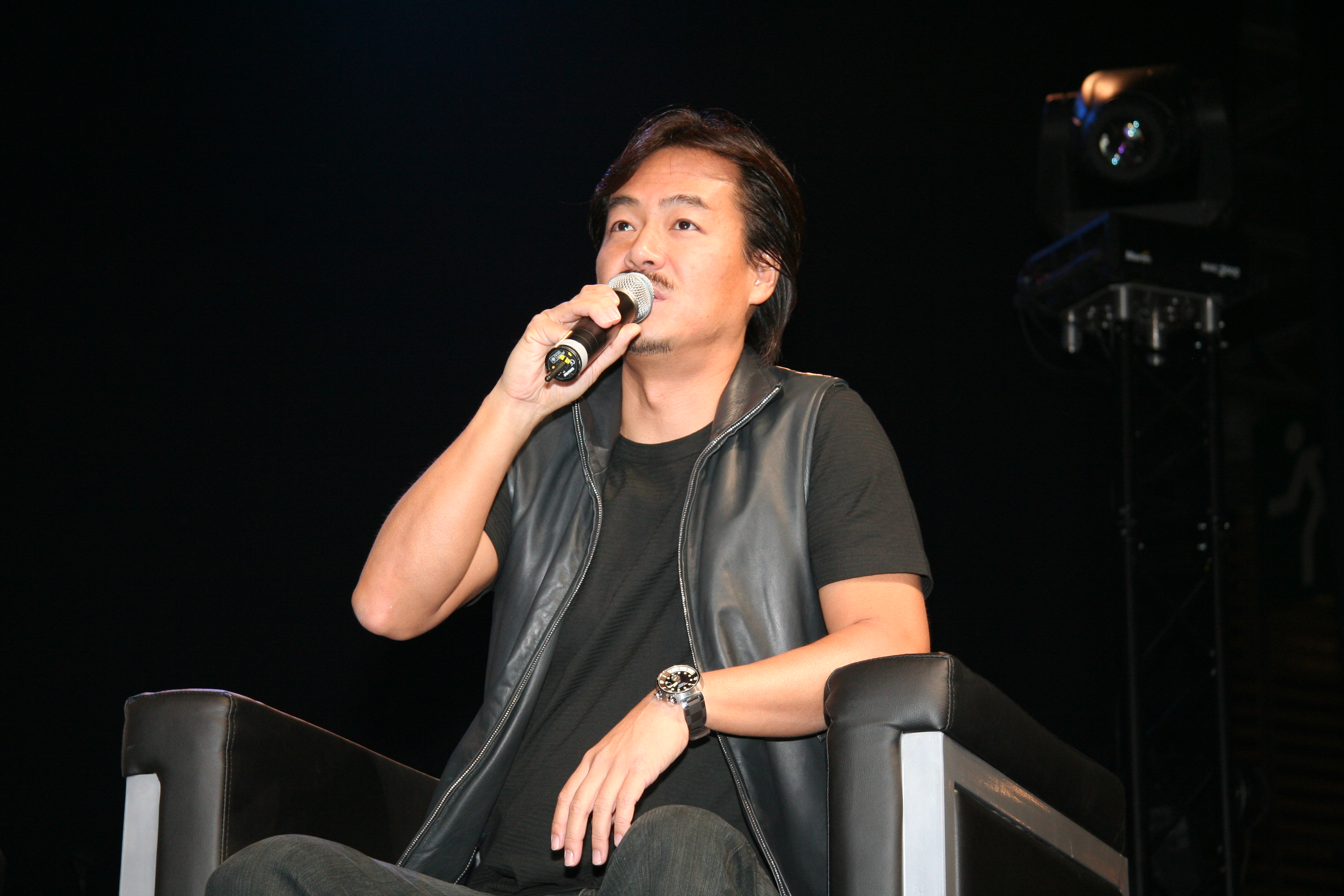
Hironobu Sakaguchi (shown in 2007) created the first Final Fantasy game in 1987 and oversaw the expansion of the franchise through 2001.

In the mid-1980s, Square entered the Japanese video game industry with simple RPGs, racing games, and platformers for Nintendo's Famicom Disk System. In 1987, Square designer Hironobu Sakaguchi chose to create a new fantasy role-playing game for the cartridge-based NES, and drew inspiration from popular fantasy games: Enix's Dragon Quest, Nintendo's The Legend of Zelda, and Origin Systems's Ultima series. Though often attributed to the company allegedly facing bankruptcy, Sakaguchi explained that the game was his personal last-ditch effort in the game industry and that its title, Final Fantasy, stemmed from his feelings at the time; had the game not sold well, he would have quit the business and gone back to college. Despite his explanation, publications have also attributed the name to the company's hopes that the project would solve its financial troubles. In 2015, Sakaguchi explained the name's origin: the team wanted a title that would abbreviate to "FF", which would sound good in Japanese. The name was originally going to be Fighting Fantasy, but due to concerns over trademark conflicts with the roleplaying gamebook series of the same name, they needed to settle for something else. As the English word "Final" was well known in Japan, Sakaguchi settled on that. According to Sakaguchi, any title that created the "FF" abbreviation would have done.

The game reversed Square's lagging fortunes, and it became the company's flagship franchise. Following the success, Square immediately developed a follow up. Because Sakaguchi assumed Final Fantasy would be a stand-alone game, its story was not designed to be expanded by a sequel. The developers instead chose to carry over only thematic similarities from its predecessor, while some of the gameplay elements, such as the character advancement system, were overhauled. This approach has continued throughout the series; each major Final Fantasy game features a new setting, a new cast of characters, and an upgraded battle system. Video game writer John Harris attributed the concept of reworking the game system of each installment to Nihon Falcom's Dragon Slayer series, with which Square was previously involved as a publisher. The company regularly released new games in the main series, but the time between the releases of XI (2002), XII (2006), and XIII (2009) were much longer than previous games. Following Final Fantasy XIV (2010), Square Enix aimed to release Final Fantasy games either annually or biennially. This switch was to mimic the development cycles of Western games in the Call of Duty, Assassin's Creed and Battlefield series, as well as maintain fan-interest. Final Fantasy XIV was later relaunched in 2013 with Final Fantasy XV following in 2016 and Final Fantasy XVI in 2023.

=== Design ===
For the original Final Fantasy, Sakaguchi required a larger production team than Square's previous games. He began crafting the game's story while experimenting with gameplay ideas. Once the gameplay system and game world size were established, Sakaguchi integrated his story ideas into the available resources. A different approach has been taken for subsequent games; the story is completed first and the game built around it. Designers have never been restricted by consistency, though most feel each game should have a minimum number of common elements. The development teams strive to create completely new worlds for each game, and avoid making new games too similar to previous ones. Game locations are conceptualized early in development and design details like building parts are fleshed out as a base for entire structures.

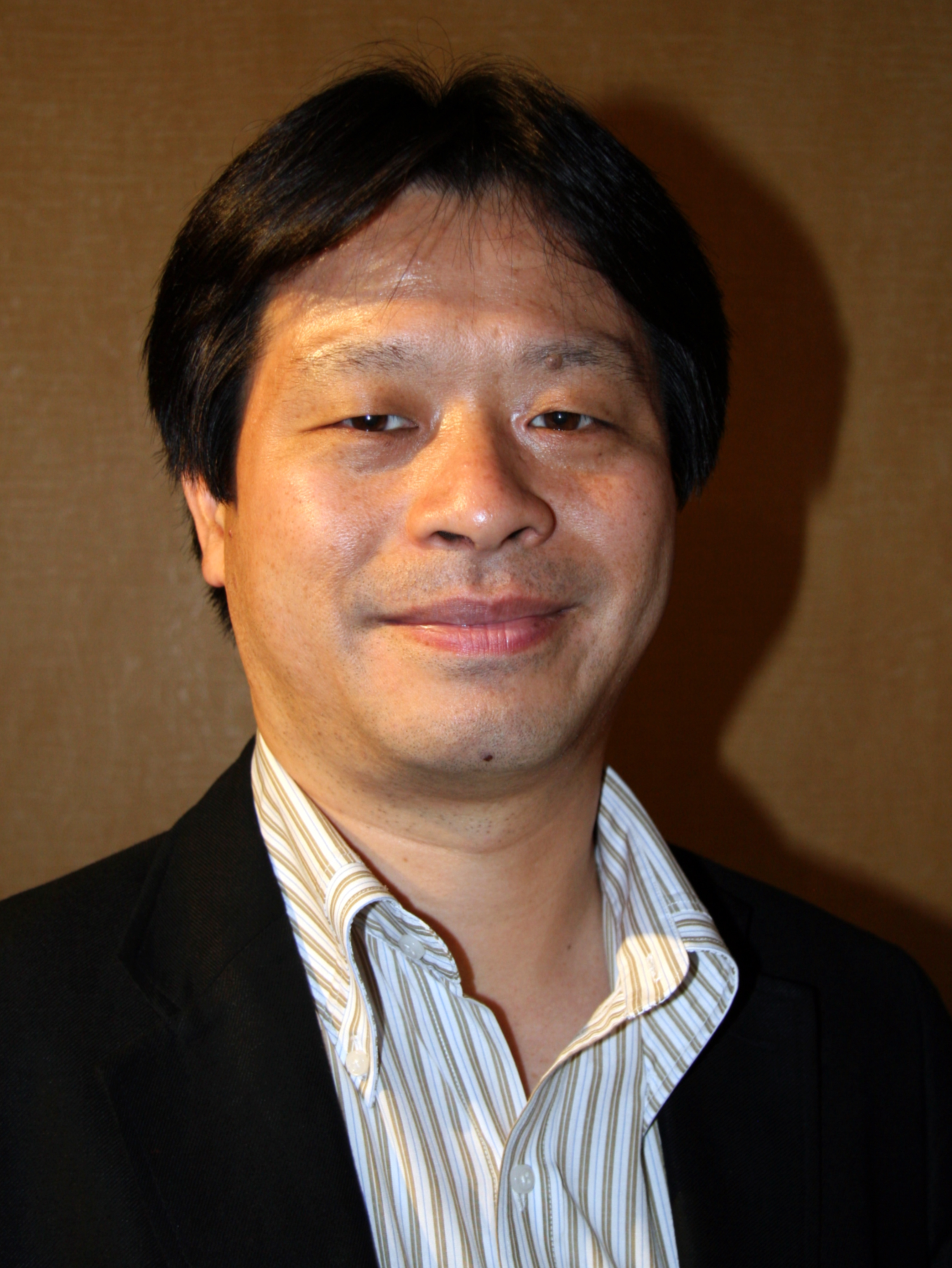
Yoshinori Kitase (shown in 2009) wrote Final Fantasy V's scenario and then shifted to directing later games.

The first five games were directed by Sakaguchi, who also provided the original concepts. He drew inspiration for game elements from anime films by Hayao Miyazaki; series staples like the airships and chocobos are inspired by elements in Castle in the Sky and Nausicaä of the Valley of the Wind, respectively. Sakaguchi served as a producer for subsequent games until he left Square in 2001. Yoshinori Kitase took over directing the games until Final Fantasy VIII, and has been followed by a new director for each new game. Hiroyuki Ito designed several gameplay systems, including Final Fantasy V's "Job System", Final Fantasy VIII's "Junction System" and the Active Time Battle concept, which was used from Final Fantasy IV until IX. In designing the Active Time Battle system, Ito drew inspiration from Formula One racing; he thought it would be interesting if character types had different speeds after watching race cars pass each other. Ito also co-directed Final Fantasy VI with Kitase. Kenji Terada was the scenario writer for the first three games; Kitase took over as scenario writer for Final Fantasy V through VII. Kazushige Nojima became the series' primary scenario writer from Final Fantasy VII until his resignation in October 2003; he has since formed his own company, Stellavista. Nojima partially or completely wrote the stories for Final Fantasy VII, VIII, X, and its sequel X-2. He also worked as the scenario writer for the spin-off series, Kingdom Hearts. Daisuke Watanabe co-wrote the scenarios for Final Fantasy X and XII, and was the main writer for the XIII games.

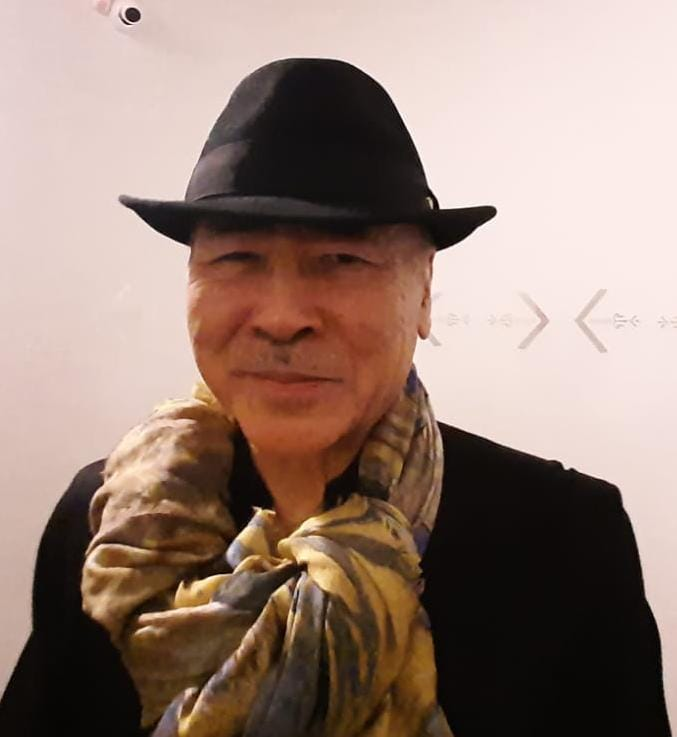
Final Fantasy VI artwork (left) by Yoshitaka Amano (right), who provided designs for the early games and promotional artwork for much of the series.

Artistic design, including conceptual artworks and monster creations, was handled by Japanese artist Yoshitaka Amano from Final Fantasy through Final Fantasy VI. Amano also handled title logo designs for all of the main series and the image illustrations from Final Fantasy VII onward. Koichi Ishii, who served as a graphic designer, created the character designs from Final Fantasy I to III while Kazuko Shibuya was responsible for adapting both the characters and monsters designs into pixel art. Shibuya went on to become the main pixel artist throughout the series while also doing the character designs for IV, V and most of the cast of VI. Tetsuya Nomura was chosen to replace Amano because Nomura's designs were more adaptable to 3D graphics. He worked with the series from Final Fantasy VII through X, then came back for XIII, and for the basic design of XV. For Final Fantasy IX character designs were handled by Shukō Murase, Toshiyuki Itahana, and Shin Nagasawa. For Final Fantasy XV, Roberto Ferrari was responsible for the character design. Nomura is also the character designer of the Kingdom Hearts series, Compilation of Final Fantasy VII, and Fabula Nova Crystallis: Final Fantasy. Other designers include Nobuyoshi Mihara and Akihiko Yoshida. Mihara was the character designer for Final Fantasy XI, and Yoshida served as character designer for Final Fantasy Tactics, the Square-produced Vagrant Story, and Final Fantasy XII. For Final Fantasy XVI, the character designs were handled by Kazuya Takahashi and Hiroshi Minagawa.

=== Graphics and technology ===
Because of graphical limitations, the NES games feature small sprite representations of the leading party members on the main world screen. Battle screens use more detailed, full versions of characters in a side-view perspective. This practice was used until Final Fantasy VI, which uses detailed sprites for both screens. The NES sprites are 26 pixels high and use a color palette of four colors. The games swap btween six frames of animation to depict character statuses like "healthy" and "fatigued". The SNES installments use updated graphics and effects, as well as higher quality audio than previous games, but are otherwise similar to their predecessors in basic design. The SNES sprites are 2 pixels shorter and have larger palettes and feature more animation frames: 11 colors and 40 frames, respectively. The upgrade allowed designers to portray characters with more detailed appearances and more emotions. The first game includes non-player characters (NPCs) the player could interact with, but they are mostly static in-game objects. Beginning with the second game, Square used predetermined pathways for NPCs to create more dynamic scenes that include comedy and drama.

In 1995, Square showed an interactive SGI technical demonstration of Final Fantasy VI for the then next generation of consoles. The demonstration used Silicon Graphics's prototype Nintendo 64 workstations to create 3D graphics. Fans believed the demo was of a new Final Fantasy game for the Nintendo 64 console. 1997 saw the release of Final Fantasy VII for the Sony PlayStation. The switch was due to a dispute with Nintendo over its use of expensive cartridge media with that access data quickly, as opposed to the compact discs, which are slower but less costly and have a higher storage capacity, used on rival systems. VII introduced 3D graphics with fully pre-rendered backgrounds. It was because of this switch to 3D that a CD-ROM format was chosen over a cartridge format. The switch also led to increased production costs and a greater subdivision of the creative staff for VII and subsequent 3D games in the series.

The developers switched to 3D graphics using pre-rendered backgrounds for Final Fantasy VII and continued the trend with Final Fantasy VIII (pictured) and Final Fantasy IX.

Starting with Final Fantasy VIII, the series adopted a more photo-realistic look. Like VII, full motion video (FMV) sequences would play video in the background, with the polygonal characters composited on top. Final Fantasy IX returned to the more stylized design of earlier games in the series, although it maintained most of the graphical techniques used in the previous two games with slight upgrades. Final Fantasy X was released on the PlayStation 2, which was powerful enough to render graphics in real-time in order to obtain a more dynamic look; the game features full 3D environments, rather than having 3D character models superimposed on pre-rendered backgrounds. It is also the first Final Fantasy game to feature voice acting, occurring throughout the majority of the game, even with many minor characters; this allowed the developers to portray more depth in characters' reactions, emotions, and development.

Taking a temporary divergence, Final Fantasy XI used the PlayStation 2's online capabilities as an MMORPG. Initially released for the PlayStation 2 with a PC port arriving six months later, XI was also released on the Xbox 360 nearly four years after its original release in Japan. This was the first Final Fantasy game to use a free rotating camera. Final Fantasy XII was released in 2006 for the PlayStation 2 and uses half as many polygons as Final Fantasy X, in exchange for more advanced textures and lighting. It also retains the freely rotating camera from XI. Final Fantasy XIII and XIV both make use of Crystal Tools, a middleware engine developed by Square Enix.

=== Music ===
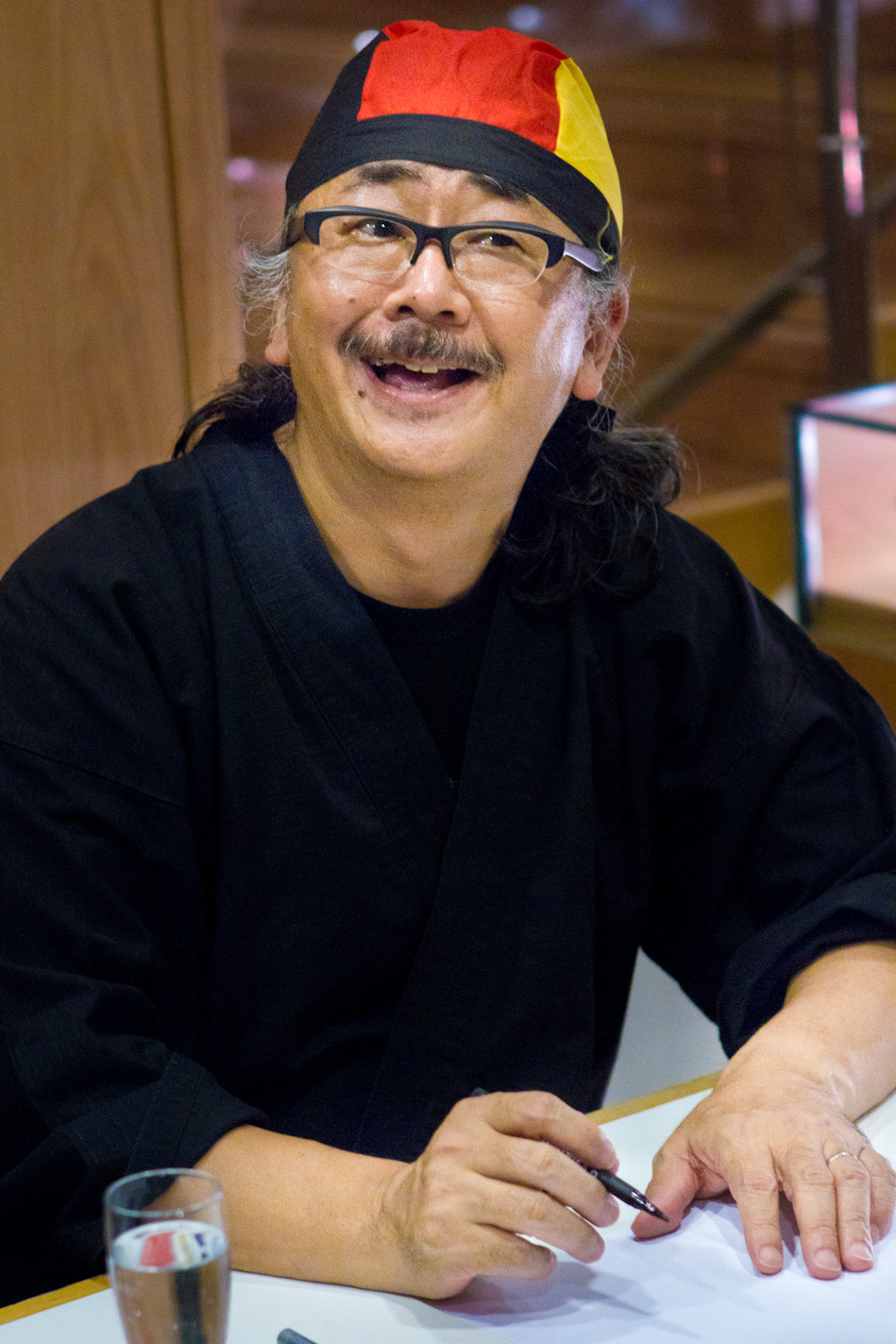
Nobuo Uematsu (shown in 2011)

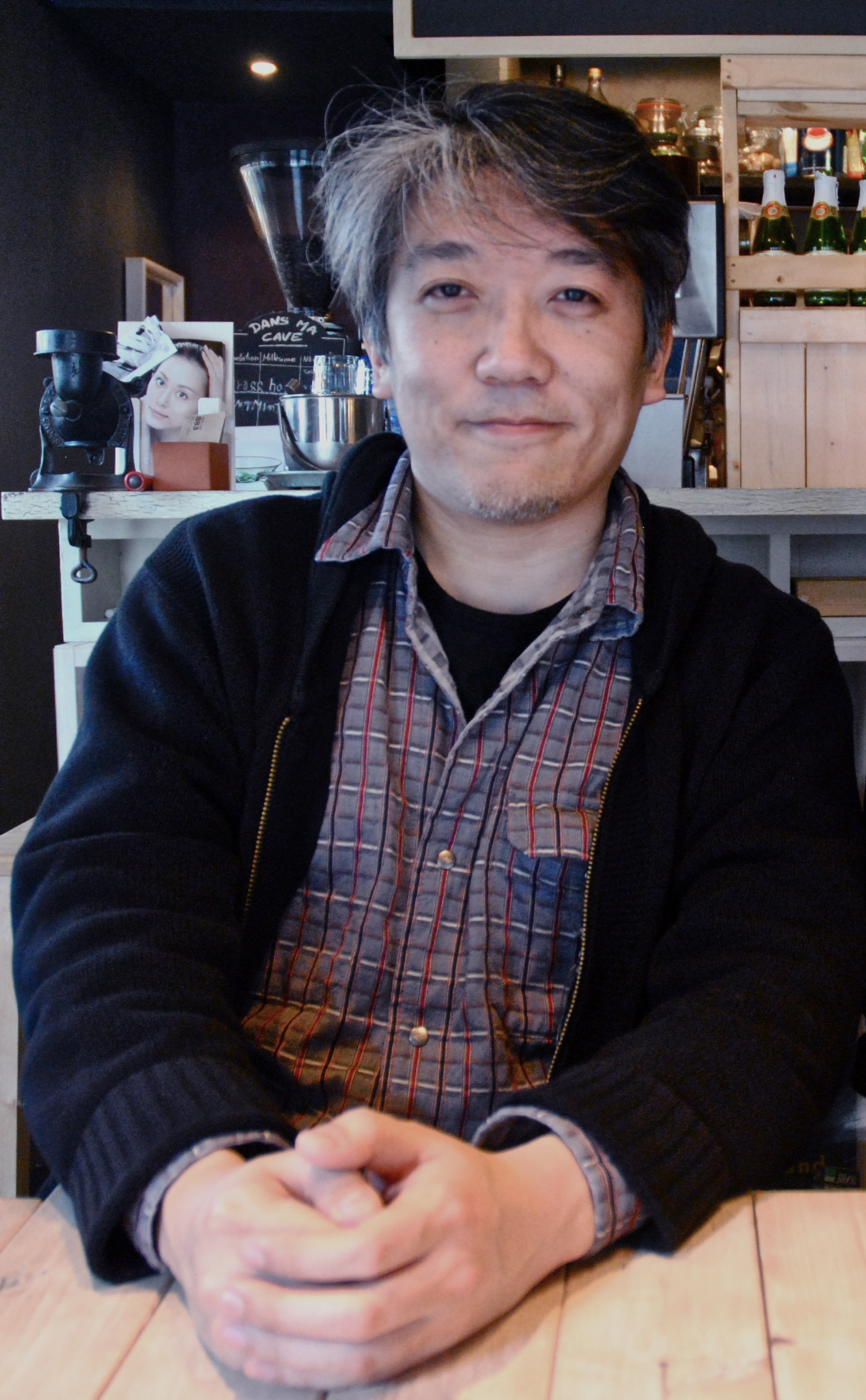
Masashi Hamauzu (shown in 2012)

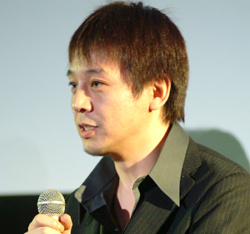
Hitoshi Sakimoto (shown in 2004)

As the series' primary composer for over a decade, Nobuo Uematsu created many of its musical themes. Following Uematsu's departure, other composers, like Masashi Hamauzu and Hitoshi Sakimoto, have handled the music for various games.

Final Fantasy games feature a variety of music and frequently reuse themes. Most games open with a piece called "Prelude", which has evolved from a simple, 2-voice arpeggio in the early games to a complex, melodic arrangement in later installments. Victories in combat are often accompanied by a victory fanfare, a theme that has become one of the most recognized pieces of music in the series. The basic theme that accompanies Chocobo appearances has been rearranged in a different musical style for most installments. Recurring secret bosses such as Gilgamesh are also used as opportunities to revive their musical themes.

A theme known as the "Final Fantasy Main Theme" or "March", originally featured in the first game, often accompanies the ending credits. Although leitmotifs are common in the more character-driven installments, theme music is typically reserved for main characters and recurring plot elements.

Nobuo Uematsu was the primary composer of the Final Fantasy series until his resignation from Square Enix in November 2004. Other notable composers who have worked on main entries in the series include Masashi Hamauzu, Hitoshi Sakimoto, and Yoko Shimomura. Uematsu was allowed to create much of the music with little direction from the production staff. Sakaguchi, however, would request pieces to fit specific game scenes including battles and exploring different areas of the game world. Once a game's major scenarios were completed, Uematsu would begin writing the music based on the story, characters, and accompanying artwork. He started with a game's main theme, and developed other pieces to match its style. In creating character themes, Uematsu read the game's scenario to determine the characters' personality. He would also ask the scenario writer for more details to scenes he was unsure about. Technical limitations were prevalent in earlier games; Sakaguchi would sometimes instruct Uematsu to only use specific notes. It was not until Final Fantasy IV on the SNES that Uematsu was able to add more subtlety to the music.

== Reception ==
Overall, the Final Fantasy series has been critically acclaimed and commercially successful, though each installment has seen different levels of success. The series has seen a steady increase in total sales; it sold 25 million units by 2000, and reached 100 million units in 2011. By March 2025, the series surpassed cumulative global physical and digital sales of 200 million units.

The series has received critical acclaim for the quality of its visuals and soundtracks. In 1996, Next Generation staff ranked the series collectively as the 17th best game of all time, speaking very highly of its audiovisuals and stories. Two years later, they listed the Final Fantasy series number 16 on their "Top 50 Games of All Time", commenting that "by pairing state-of-the-art technology with memorable, sometimes shamelessly melodramatic storylines, the series has successfully outlasted its competitors [...] and improved with each new installation". It was awarded a star on the Walk of Game in 2006, making it the first franchise to win a star on the event (other winners were individual games, not franchises). WalkOfGame.com commented that the series has sought perfection as well as having been a risk taker in innovation. As of 2025, the Final Fantasy series has won 10 awards at The Game Awards, more than for any other video game franchise.

However, the series has garnered criticism. IGN has commented that the menu system used by the games is a major detractor for many and is a "significant reason why they haven't touched the series". The editors has heavily criticized the use of random encounters in the series' battle systems. IGN further stated that the various attempts to bring the series into film and animation have either been unsuccessful, unremarkable, or did not live up to the standards of the games. Edge magazine writers were critical of the series' expansion in 2007, questioning how many of the related games with "Final Fantasy" in their titles lived up to the franchise's reputation of quality. They feared that Hironobu Sakaguchi's departure would result in the series growing stale.

Several individual Final Fantasy games have garnered focused attention; some for widespread positive reception and others for a negative reception. Final Fantasy VII topped GamePro's "26 Best RPGs of All Time" list, as well as GameFAQs' "Best Game Ever" audience polls in 2004 and 2005. It was inducted into the World Video Game Hall of Fame in 2018. Despite Final Fantasy VII's success, some critics have labeled it as overrated. In 2003, GameSpy listed it as the seventh most overrated game of all time, while IGN presented views from both sides. Dirge of Cerberus: Final Fantasy VII shipped 392,000 units in its first week of release, but received review scores that were much lower than other Final Fantasy games. A delayed, negative review after the Japanese release of Dirge of Cerberus from Japanese gaming magazine Famitsu hinted at a controversy between the magazine and Square Enix. Though Final Fantasy: The Spirits Within was praised for its visuals, the plot was criticized and the film was considered a box office bomb. Final Fantasy Crystal Chronicles for the GameCube received overall positive review scores, but reviews stated that the use of Game Boy Advances as controllers was a big detractor. The predominantly negative reception of the original version of Final Fantasy XIV caused then-president Yoichi Wada to issue an official apology during a Tokyo press conference, stating that the brand had been "greatly damaged" by the game's reception.

Many of the main series titles have become best-selling games. At the end of 2007, the seventh, eighth, and ninth best-selling RPGs were Final Fantasy VII, VIII, and X, respectively. Final Fantasy VII, the best-selling game in the franchise, has sold over 14.4 million copies worldwide, Within two days of its North American release on September 9, 1999, Final Fantasy VIII became the top-selling video game in the United States and held the position for more than three weeks. Final Fantasy X sold over 1.4 million units in Japanese pre-orders alone, setting a record for the fastest-selling console RPG. The Final Fantasy XI MMORPG reached over 200,000 active daily players in March 2006 and over half a million subscribers by July 2007. Final Fantasy XII sold more than 1.7 million copies in its first week in Japan. By November 6, 2006—one week after its release—XII had shipped approximately 1.5 million copies in North America. Final Fantasy XIII became the fastest-selling game in the franchise, and sold one million units on its first day of sale in Japan. Final Fantasy XIV: A Realm Reborn, in comparison to its predecessor, was a runaway success, originally suffering from servers being overcrowded, and eventually gaining over one million subscribers within two months of its launch.

=== Rankings and aggregators ===
Numerous publications have created rankings of the mainline Final Fantasy games. The main titles have frequently appeared in top lists of games; for example, IGN has included them in multiple "Top Games" lists. Twelve games appeared in Famitsu's 2006 "Top 100 Favorite Games of All Time", four of which were in the top ten. In 2006, GameFAQs held a contest for the best video game series ever, with Final Fantasy finishing as the runner-up to The Legend of Zelda. In a 2008 public poll held by The Game Group plc, Final Fantasy was voted the best game series, with five games appearing in their "Greatest Games of All Time" list. The 2009 release of Guinness World Records Gamer's Edition listed two games from the series among the top 50 consoles games: Final Fantasy XII at number 8 and VII at number 20.

In the tables below, the lower numbers in top lists and series rankings mean a higher distinction of quality given by the respective publications. By way of comparison, the ratings provided by Famitsu magazine and the review aggregator Metacritic are also given; in these rows, higher numbers indicate better reviews. Note that Metacritic ratings up until Final Fantasy VII largely represent retrospective reviews from online websites years after their initial release, rather than contemporary reviews from video game magazines at the time of their initial release.

Appearance in Top Lists
Publication	Year	I	II	III	IV	V	VI	VII	VIII	IX	X	XI	XII	XIII	XIV	XV	Notes
Empire	2023							6		18							100 Best Video Games
Famitsu	2006	63	60	8	6	15	25	2	22	24	1						Top 100 Reader Poll
Game Informer	2017	33			23		2	18			35						Top 100 RPGs
GamePro	2008							1					13				26 Best RPGs
Jeuxvideo	2011				82		53	8									100 Best Games
Popular Mechanics	2022						33	4									100 Greatest Video Games
Retro Gamer	2004	93						4									Top 100 Reader Poll
Slant Magazine	2014						39	16		46	23						100 Greatest Video Games
Stuff	2008						2	1									100 Greatest Games
TV Asahi	2021			63	51	34	33	3	90	37	9	84			47		Top 100 Viewer Poll

Series Rankings
Publication	Year	I	II	III	IV	V	VI	VII	VIII	IX	X	XI	XII	XIII	XIV	XV	Notes
Den of Geek	2016	14	17	6	5	9	1	3	10	4	2	8	7	15	11		
Digital Spy	2019	12	13	10	6	7	4	3	11	2	1		5	8		9	
Digital Trends	2019	13	15	11	6	9	1	7	2	5	3	10	4	12	8	14	
GamesRadar+	2017			17	5	13	1	3	9	7	14	18	2	23	11	15	Compared the entire video game series, including non-mainline games.
IGN	2016	7	12	8	4	5	1	6	11	3	9		2	10			Ranking of single-player, mainline entries
Kotaku	2013	10	11	8	3	5	1	4	6	2	7		9	12			
NHK	2020	24	18	12	8	6	3	2	7	4	1	9	15	14	5	10	Viewer poll of 468,654 votes
Polygon	2017	14	15	12	4	3	1	8	5	6	10	11	2	13	7	9	Both versions of Final Fantasy XIV appear on the list. The ranking for the re-release is shown.
Rock Paper Shotgun	2024					9	5	2	1	4	3		6	10	8	7	10 best Final Fantasy games on PC
VentureBeat	2016	12	14	13	10	3	2	5	9	1	7	15	4	11	8	6	
VG247	2019				9	4	3	2	5	1	8		6	10		7	10 best main games in series

Review Scores
Publication	I	II	III	IV	V	VI	VII	VIII	IX	X	XI	XII	XIII	XIV	XV	Notes
Famitsu rating (out of 40)	34	35	36	36	34	37	38	37	38	39	38	40	39	39	38	Four reviewers each provided a score ranging from 0–10 that are combined into a total score.
Metacritic rating (out of 100)	79	79	77	85	83	92	92	90	94	92	85	92	83	83	85	

== Legacy ==
=== Industry impact ===
Final Fantasy has been influential in the history of video games and game mechanics. Final Fantasy IV is considered a milestone for the genre, introducing a dramatic storyline with a strong emphasis on character development and personal relationships. In 1992, Nintendo's Shigeru Miyamoto noted the impact of Final Fantasy on Japanese role-playing games, stating Final Fantasy's "interactive cinematic approach" with an emphasis on "presentation and graphics" was gradually becoming "the most common style" of Japanese RPG at the time. Final Fantasy VII, the first of the series officially released in the PAL territories of Europe and Oceania, is credited with having the largest industry impact of the series, and with allowing console role-playing games to gain global mass-market appeal. VII is considered to be one of the most important and influential video games in the series.

The series affected Square's business on several levels. The commercial failure of Final Fantasy: The Spirits Within resulted in hesitation and delays from Enix during merger discussions with Square. Square's decision to produce games exclusively for the Sony PlayStation—a move followed by Enix's decision with the Dragon Quest series—severed their relationship with Nintendo. Final Fantasy games were absent from Nintendo consoles, specifically the Nintendo 64, for seven years. Critics attribute the switch of strong third-party games like the Final Fantasy and Dragon Quest games to Sony's PlayStation, and away from the Nintendo 64, as one of the reasons behind PlayStation being the more successful of the two consoles. The release of the Nintendo GameCube, which used optical disc media, in 2001 caught the attention of Square. To produce games for the system, Square created the shell company The Game Designers Studio and released Final Fantasy Crystal Chronicles, which spawned its own series within the franchise. Final Fantasy XI's lack of an online method to cancel subscriptions led to the creation of legislation in the US state Illinois that requires internet gaming services to provide such a method to the state's residents. Guinness World Records recognized the game as the first RPG to prompt a change in State law.

The series has inspired numerous game developers. Fable creator Peter Molyneux considers Final Fantasy VII to be the RPG that "defined the genre" for him. BioWare founder Greg Zeschuk described Final Fantasy VII as "the first really emotionally engaging game" he played and said it had "a big impact" on BioWare's work. The Witcher 3 senior environmental artist Jonas Mattsson cited Final Fantasy as "a huge influence" and said it was "the first RPG" he played through. Mass Effect art director Derek Watts cited Final Fantasy: The Spirits Within as a major influence on the visual design and art direction of the series. BioWare senior product manager David Silverman cited Final Fantasy XII's gambit system as an influence on the gameplay of Dragon Age: Origins. Ubisoft Toronto creative director Maxime Beland cited the original Final Fantasy as a major influence on him. Media Molecule's Constantin Jupp credited Final Fantasy VII with getting him into game design. Tim Schafer also cited Final Fantasy VII as one of his favourite games.

=== Cultural impact ===
The series' popularity has resulted in its appearance and reference in numerous facets of popular culture like anime, TV series, and webcomics. Music from the series has permeated different areas of culture. Final Fantasy IV's "Theme of Love" was integrated into the curriculum of Japanese school children and has been performed live by orchestras and metal bands. In 2003, Uematsu co-founded The Black Mages, an instrumental rock group independent of Square that has released albums of arranged Final Fantasy tunes. Bronze medalists Alison Bartosik and Anna Kozlova performed their synchronized swimming routine at the 2004 Summer Olympics to music from Final Fantasy VIII. Monty Oum released a fan-made web series of CG action films called Dead Fantasy in 2007 that feature Final Fantasy and Dead or Alive characters fighting in battle royale-style brawls. The series holds seven Guinness World Records, which include the "Most Games in an RPG Series" (13 main games, seven enhanced games, and 32 spin-off games), the "Longest Development Period" (the production of Final Fantasy XII took five years), and the "Fastest-Selling Console RPG in a Single Day" (Final Fantasy X).

== See also ==
- Granblue Fantasy – a 2013 video game featuring key staff from Final Fantasy.
- The Last Story – a 2012 video game featuring key staff from Final Fantasy.
- Bravely Default – a 2012 spiritual successor to Final Fantasy released on the 3DS.
- List of Square Enix video game franchises
