= List of role-playing video games: 2010 to 2011 =

This is a comprehensive index of commercial role-playing video games (RPGs), sorted chronologically by year. Information regarding release platform, release type, RPG subgenre, game setting, developers, publishers, and country of origin is provided where available. The table can be sorted by clicking on the small boxes next to the column headings.

This list includes all RPG subgenres, including MMORPGs, Action RPGs and Tactical RPGs. This list does not include MUDs and Roguelikes by default, unless they have an additional RPG subgenre. For standalone lists on these subgenres, see List of MUDs and List of roguelikes

== Legend ==
Video game platforms
| 3DS | Nintendo 3DS, 3DS Virtual Console, iQue 3DS | DROID | Android | DC | Dreamcast |
| DS | Nintendo DS, DSiWare, iQue DS | GEN | Genesis / Mega Drive | iOS | iOS, iPhone, iPod, iPadOS, iPad, visionOS, Apple Vision Pro |
| LIN | Linux, SteamOS | MOBI | Mobile phone | OSX | macOS |
| OUYA | Ouya | NX | (replace with NS) | PS3 | PlayStation 3 |
| PS4 | PlayStation 4 | PSP | PlayStation Portable | PSV | PlayStation Vita |
| SNG | social network game | Steam | Steam | VC | Term not found |
| WEB | Browser game | Wii | Wii, WiiWare, Wii Virtual Console | WiiU | Wii U, WiiU Virtual Console |
| WIN | Windows, all versions Windows 95 and up | X360 | (replace with XB360) | XOne | (replace with XBO) |

Types of releases
| Compilation | A compilation, anthology or collection of several titles, usually (but not always) belonging to the same series |
| Early access | A game launched in early access is unfinished and thus might contain bugs and glitches or have some of the content missing |
| Episodic | An episodic video game that is released in batches over a period of time |
| Expansion | A large-scale DLC to an already existing game that adds new story, areas and additions and/or changes to the game's mechanics |
| Full release | A full release of a game that launched in early access first |
| Limited | A special release (often called "Limited" or "Collector's Edition") with bonus collector's material. Often provided to people who pre-order a game |
| Port | The game first appeared on a different platform and a port was made. The game is like the original, with few or no differences |
| Remake | The game is an enhanced remake of an original, made using a new engine and/or assets and thus containing completely new sound, graphics and possibly changes to the story and/or gameplay |
| Remaster | The game is a remaster of an original, released on the same or different platform, with (usually minor) changes to graphics, sound and/or gameplay |
| Rerelease | The game was re-released on the same platform with no or only minor changes |

Video game genres
| Action RPG | Action role-playing game | Dungeon crawl | Dungeon crawl | JRPG | Japanese-style role-playing game |
| MMORPG | Massively multiplayer online RPG | Monster tamer | Monster-taming game | MUD | Multi-user dungeon |
| Real-time | Real-time game | Roguelike | Roguelike, Roguelite | Sandbox | Sandbox game |
| Soulslike | Soulslike | Tactical RPG | Tactical role-playing game | Turn-based | Turn-based game |

== List ==
| Year | Title | Developer | Publisher | Theme | Platform | Genre | Series/Notes | COO |
|---|---|---|---|---|---|---|---|---|
| 2010 | .hack//Link (EN) | CyberConnect2 | Bandai Namco Entertainment | | PSP | | | JP |
| 2010 | 100 Rogues (EN) | Fusion Reactions | Fusion Reactions | | Ouya, iOS | Roguelike | | US |
| 2010 (JP); 2011 (NA/EU) | The 3rd Birthday (EN) ザ・サード バースデイ (JA) | HexaDrive, Square Enix | Square Enix | Post-apocalyptic | PSP | Action RPG | Part of Parasite Eve series | JP |
| 2010 | A Farewell to Dragons (EN) | | Excalibur Publishing | | WIN | | | |
| 2010 (NA/PAL) | Alpha Protocol (EN) | Obsidian Entertainment | Sega Games | Modern | WIN, PS3, X360 | Action RPG | | US |
| 2010 | Ar tonelico Qoga: Knell of Ar Ciel (EN) アルトネリコ3 世界終焉の引鉄は少女の詩が弾く (JA) | Gust Co. Ltd. | Bandai Namco Holdings | | PS3 | | Ar tonelico | |
| 2010 | Arcania: Gothic 4 (EN) | Spellbound Entertainment | JoWooD Entertainment | Fantasy | WIN, PS3, X360 | Action RPG | Gothic | |
| 2010 | Ash (EN) | SRRN Games | SRRN Games | Fantasy | iOS, DROID, 3DS | Turn-based | | US |
| 2010 | Atelier Totori: The Adventurer of Arland (EN) トトリのアトリエ 〜アーランドの錬金術士2〜 (JA) | Gust Co. Ltd. | Nippon Ichi Software | | PS3, PSV | | Atelier | |
| 2010 | Blaze Union: Story to Reach the Future (EN) ブレイズ・ユニオン (JA) | Sting Entertainment | Atlus | | PSP | Tactical RPG | Dept. Heaven | |
| 2010 | Braveheart (EN) | Gaijin Entertainment | Gaijin Entertainment | Fantasy | iOS | Action RPG | | |
| 2010 | Chaos Rings (EN) | Media.Vision | Square Enix | | DROID, iOS, PSV | | | |
| 2010 | Cladun: This is an RPG (EN) クラシックダンジョン 〜扶翼の魔装陣〜 (JA) | | Nippon Ichi Software | | PSP | Action RPG | | |
| 2010 | Combat of Giants: Dinosaur Strike (EN) | Ubisoft Quebec | | | Wii | | | |
| 2010 | Costume Quest (EN) | Double Fine Productions | THQ | Fantasy | DROID, LIN, WIN, PS3, MAC, iOS | Adventure | | |
| 2010 | Cow Clicker (EN) | Ian Bogost | | | | Simulation | | |
| 2010 | Crystal Monsters (EN) | Gameloft | | | | | | |
| 2010 (JP) | Digimon Story Lost Evolution | BEC | Bandai Namco Games | Fantasy | DS | Turn-based | Digimon | JP |
| 2010 (??) | Din's Curse | Soldak Entertainment | Masque Publishing | Fantasy | WIN, OSX | Action RPG | Depths of Peril | |
| 2010 (??) | Divinity II: Ego Draconis | Larian Studios | cdv Software Entertainment | Fantasy | WIN | | Divine Divinity | |
| 2010 | Dragon Age: Origins – Awakening (EN) | BioWare | Electronic Arts | Fantasy | WIN, PS3, MAC, X360 | | Dragon Age | |
| 2010 | Dragon Quest Monsters: Joker 2 (EN) ドラゴンクエストモンスターズ ジョーカー2 (JA) | Tose Co. | Square Enix | | DS | | Dragon Quest Monsters | |
| 2010 | Drakensang: The River of Time (EN) | Nebula Device | dtp entertainment | Fantasy | WIN | | | |
| 2010 (??) | Eschalon: Book II (EN) | Basilisk | Basilisk | Fantasy | WIN, OSX, LIN | Action RPG | Eschalon | US |
| 2010 | Etrian Odyssey III: The Drowned City (EN) 世界樹の迷宮III 星海の来訪者 (JA) | Atlus | | | DS | | | |
| 2010 | Fable III (EN) | Lionhead Studios | Microsoft Studios | Fantasy | WIN, X360 | Action RPG, Open world | Fable | |
| 2010 | Faery: Legends of Avalon (EN) | Spiders | Focus Home Interactive | | WIN | | | |
| 2010 | Fallout: New Vegas (EN) | Obsidian Entertainment | Bethesda Softworks | Post-apocalyptic | WIN, PS3, X360 | Action RPG, Open world | Fallout | US |
| 2010 | Final Fantasy Dimensions (EN) ファイナルファンタジー レジェンズ 光と闇の戦士 (JA) | Matrix Software | Square Enix | | DROID, iOS | | Final Fantasy | |
| 2010 | Fire Emblem: Shin Monshō no Nazo: Hikari to Kage no Eiyū (EN) ファイアーエムブレム 新・紋章の謎 〜光と影の英雄〜 (JA); Faiā Emuburemu: Shin Monshō no Nazo ~Hikari to Kage no Eiyū~ (JA) | Intelligent Systems | Nintendo | | DS | Tactical RPG | Fire Emblem | JP |
| 2010 | Fossil Fighters: Champions (EN) スーパーカセキホリダー (JA) | Nintendo Software Planning & Development | Nintendo | | DS | | | |
| 2010 | Gladiator Begins (EN) | | Acquire | | PSP | Action RPG | | |
| 2010 | Golden Sun: Dark Dawn (EN) | Camelot Software Planning | Nintendo | Fantasy | DS | Turn-based | Golden Sun | JP |
| 2010 | Gujian Qitan (EN) | Q10867971 | | | WIN, XOne | | | |
| 2010 | Hand of Greed - Dodge the Blade! (EN) | Appular | Appular | | iOS | | | |
| 2010 | Hyperdimension Neptunia (EN) ネプテューヌシリーズ (JA) | Idea Factory | Compile Heart | Magical girl | PS3, STE, PS4 | | | JP |
| 2010 | Inazuma Eleven 3 (EN) イナズマイレブン3 世界への挑戦!! (JA) | Level-5 | Nintendo | | DS | | | |
| 2010 | Infinity Blade (EN) | Chair Entertainment | Epic Games | Fantasy | iOS | Action RPG | | |
| 2010 | Jikandia: The Timeless Land (EN) | | Idea Factory | | PSP | Action RPG | | |
| 2010 | Keroro RPG: Kishi to Musha to Densetsu no Kaizoku (EN) ケロロRPG 騎士と武者と伝説の海賊 (JA) | Namco Tales Studio | Bandai Namco Entertainment | | DS | | Tales | |
| 2010 | King's Bounty: Crossworlds (EN) | Q4042099 | 1C Company | Fantasy | WIN | Tactical RPG | King's Bounty | |
| 2010 | The Kings' Crusade (EN) | NeocoreGames | Paradox Interactive | | WIN | RTS | | |
| 2010 (JP/NA/PAL) | Kingdom Hearts Birth by Sleep (EN) キングダムハーツ バース バイ スリープ | Square Enix | Square Enix | Fantasy, Fictional crossover | PSP, PS3 | Action RPG | Kingdom Hearts | JP |
| 2010 | Last Ranker (EN) ラストランカー (JA) | Imageepoch | Capcom | | PSP | | | |
| 2010 | Last Rebellion (EN) ラストリベリオン (JA) | Nippon Ichi Software | Nippon Ichi Software | | PS3 | | | |
| 2010 | Lufia: Curse of the Sinistrals (EN) エストポリス (JA) | Neverland | Natsume | | DS | | Lufia | |
| 2010 (NA/PAL) | Mass Effect 2 (EN) | BioWare | Electronic Arts | Sci-Fi | WIN, X360, PS3 | Action RPG, Third-person shooter | Mass Effect | CA |
| 2010 | Mass Effect 2: Kasumi - Stolen Memory (EN) | BioWare | Electronic Arts | Sci-Fi | WIN | Action RPG | Mass Effect | |
| 2010 | Mass Effect 2: Lair of the Shadow Broker (EN) | BioWare | Electronic Arts | Sci-Fi | WIN, X360 | Action RPG | Mass Effect | |
| 2010 | Mass Effect 2: Overlord (EN) | BioWare | Electronic Arts | Sci-Fi | WIN | Action RPG | Mass Effect | |
| 2010 | Metal Max 3 (EN) メタルマックス3 (JA) | Cattle Call | Kadokawa Shoten | | DS | | Metal Max | |
| 2010 | Monster Hunter Portable 3rd (EN) モンスターハンターポータブル3rd (JA) | Capcom | Capcom | | PS3, PSP | Action RPG | Monster Hunter | |
| 2010 | Mount & Blade: Warband (EN) | TaleWorlds | Paradox Interactive | | WIN | Action RPG, Open world | Mount & Blade | |
| 2010 | NEStalgia (EN) | Silk Games | | | WIN | | | |
| 2010 (JP) | Ni no Kuni: Dominion of the Dark Djinn (EN) | Level-5, Studio Ghibli | Level-5 | Fantasy | DS | | | JP |
| 2010 | Nier (EN) ニーア ゲシュタルト/レプリカント (JA) | Cavia | Square Enix | | PS3, X360 | Action RPG | Drakengard | |
| 2010 | Pier Solar and the Great Architects (EN) ピアソーラーと偉大なる建築家 (JA) | WaterMelon | | | GEN, PS3, PS4, WIN, OSX, LIN, OUYA, WiiU, XOne, DC | | | |
| 2010 | The Pioneer Trail (EN) | | Zynga | | | Simulation | | |
| 2010 | Pokémon Black and White (EN) ポケットモンスター ブラック・ホワイト (JA) | Game Freak | Nintendo | | DS | | Pokémon main series | |
| 2010 | Pokémon Ranger: Guardian Signs (EN) ポケモンレンジャー 光の軌跡 (JA) | Creatures | Nintendo | | DS | Action RPG | Pokémon Ranger series | JP |
| 2010 | Puzzle Quest 2 (EN) | Infinite Interactive | D3 Publisher | | DROID, WIN, X360, iOS, DS | Puzzle video game | Puzzle Quest: Challenge of the Warlords | |
| 2010 | Ravenwood Fair (EN) | | | | SNG | Business sim | | |
| 2010 | Real Madrid Fantasy Manager (EN) | From The Bench Digital Entertainment | Real Madrid FC | | SNG | | | |
| 2010 | Recettear: An Item Shop's Tale (EN) ルセッティア 〜アイテム屋さんのはじめ方〜 (JA) | EasyGameStation | Carpe Fulgur | | WIN | | | |
| 2010 | Record of Agarest War 2 (EN) アガレスト戦記2 (JA) | Idea Factory | Compile Heart | | WIN, PS3 | | | |
| 2010 | Resonance of Fate (EN) エンド オブ エタニティ (JA) | Tri-Ace | Sega Games | | PS3, X360 | | | JP |
| 2010 | The Room (EN) | Newgrounds | Newgrounds | | WEB | | | |
| 2010 | Shenmue City (EN) シェンムー街 (JA); Shenmū Mach (JA) | | Sunsoft | | MOBI | Social network game | Shenmue | JP |
| 2010 | Shining Hearts (EN) シャイニング・ハーツ (JA) | Sega Games | Sega Games | | PSP | | Shining | |
| 2010 | Shiren the Wanderer 4: The Eye of God and the Devil's Navel (EN) 不思議のダンジョン 風来のシレン4 神の眼と悪魔のヘソ (JA); Fushigi no Dungeon: Fūrai no Shiren 4: Kami no Hitomi to Akuma no Heso (JA) | Chunsoft | Spike | | DS, PSP | | Mystery Dungeon | JP |
| 2010 | Shiren the Wanderer: The Tower of Fortune and the Dice of Fate (EN) 不思議のダンジョン 風来のシレン5 フォーチュンタワーと運命のダイス (JA); Fushigi no Dungeon: Fūrai no Shiren 5: Fortune Tower to Unmei no Dice (JA) | Chunsoft | Chunsoft, Aksys Games | | DS, PSV | Roguelike | Mystery Dungeon | JP |
| 2010 | Solatorobo: Red the Hunter (EN); Solatorobo それからCODAへ (JA) | CyberConnect2 | Bandai Namco Entertainment | | DS | Action RPG | | |
| 2010 (JP/NA/PAL) | Star Ocean: The Last Hope International | Tri-Ace | Square Enix | Sci-Fi | PS3 | Action RPG | Star Ocean | JP |
| 2010 | Tales of Phantasia: Narikiri Dungeon X (EN) テイルズ オブ ファンタジア なりきりダンジョンX (JA) | Namco Tales Studio | Bandai Namco Holdings | | PSP | | Tales | |
| 2010 | Tokyo Mono Hara Shi: Karasu no Mori Gakuen Kitan (EN) 東京鬼祓師 鴉乃杜學園奇譚 (JA) | Atlus | Atlus | | PSP | Adventure | Tokyo Majin Gakuen | |
| 2010 | Treasure Isle (EN) | Zynga | | | SNG | Simulation | | |
| 2010 | Trinity: Souls of Zill O’ll (EN) トリニティ ジルオール ゼロ (JA) | Koei Tecmo Holdings | Koei Tecmo Holdings | | PS3 | | Zill O'll | |
| 2010 | Two Worlds II (EN) | Reality Pump Studios | TopWare Interactive | | WIN, PS3, MAC, X360 | Action RPG, Open world | Two Worlds | |
| 2010 | Vandal Hearts: Flames of Judgment (EN) | | Konami | | X360 | Tactical RPG | | |
| 2010 | Voice Fantasy (EN) | Square Enix | | | iOS | | | |
| 2010 | We Farm (EN) | Zynga Dallas | ngmoco | | iOS | Simulation | | US |
| 2010 | We Rule (EN) | Zynga with Friends | ngmoco | | DROID, iOS | Simulation | | |
| 2010 | White Knight Chronicles II (EN) | Level-5 | Sony Interactive Entertainment | | PS3 | | White Knight Chronicles | |
| 2010 (JP); 2012 (NA); 2011 (PAL) | Xenoblade Chronicles (EN) ゼノブレイド (JA) | Monolith Soft | Nintendo | Sci-Fi | Wii, 3DS | Action RPG, Open world | | JP |
| 2010 | Z.H.P. Unlosing Ranger VS Darkdeath Evilman (EN) 絶対ヒーロー改造計画 (JA) | Nippon Ichi Software | | | PSP | Tactical RPG | | |
| 2010 | Zenonia 2 (EN) | Gamevil | | | DROID, iOS | Action RPG | | |
| 2011 | Alpha Kimori Episode One (EN) | Sherman3D | Sherman3D | | WIN | | | |
| 2011 | ArcaniA: Fall of Setarrif (EN) | Spellbound Entertainment | THQ Nordic | | WIN, PS3, X360 | | Gothic | |
| 2011 (JP); 2012 (NA/PAL) | Atelier Meruru: The Apprentice of Arland (EN) メルルのアトリエ 〜アーランドの錬金術士3〜 (JA); Meruru no Atorie: Ārando no Renkinjutsushi 3 (JA) | Gust Co. Ltd. | Nippon Ichi Software | Fantasy | PS3, PSV | | Atelier | JP |
| 2011 | Avadon: The Black Fortress (EN) | Spiderweb | Spiderweb | Fantasy | MAC, WIN, LIN, iOS, DROID | | | US |
| 2011 | Avernum: Escape from the Pit (EN) | Spiderweb | Spiderweb | Fantasy | MAC, WIN, iOS | | Ground-up remake of Exile: Escape From the Pit. | US |
| 2011 | Bastion (EN) バスティオン (コンピュータゲーム) (JA) | Supergiant Games | Warner Bros. Interactive Entertainment | | LIN, WEB, WIN, MAC, X360, iOS, PSV, PS4 | Action RPG | | |
| 2011 | Battleheart (EN) | | | | iOS | | | |
| 2011 | The Binding of Isaac (EN) | | Edmund McMillen | | LIN, WIN, MAC | Roguelike, Action-adventure | | |
| 2011 | Black Rock Shooter: The Game (EN) | Imageepoch | Imageepoch | | PSP | Action RPG | Black Rock Shooter | |
| 2011 | Chantelise – A Tale of Two Sisters (EN) | EasyGameStation | Carpe Fulgur | | WIN | Action RPG | | |
| 2011 | Chaos Rings Omega (EN) | Media.Vision | Square Enix | | DROID, iOS | | | |
| 2011 | Combat of Giants: Dinosaurs 3D (EN) コンバット オブ ジャイアント ダイナソー3D (JA) | Ubisoft Quebec | Ubisoft | | 3DS | Adventure | Combat of Giants | |
| 2011 | Crimson Alliance (EN) | Certain Affinity | Microsoft Studios | | X360 | Action RPG | | |
| 2011 | Dark Souls (EN) | FromSoftware | Namco Bandai Games | Fantasy | PS3, X360, WIN | Action RPG | Dark Souls | JP |
| 2011 | Darkspore (EN) | Maxis | Electronic Arts | | WIN | Action | | |
| 2011 | Dead Island (EN) | Techland | Deep Silver | | WIN, PS3, X360 | Action RPG, Open world | Dead Island | |
| 2011 | Deus Ex: Human Revolution (EN) デウスエクス (JA) | Eidos Montreal | Square Enix, Feral Interactive | | WIN, PS3, MAC, X360, WiiU | Action RPG | Deus Ex | |
| 2011 (JP) | Digimon Story: Super Xros Wars Red; Digimon Story: Super Xros Wars Blue | B.B. Studio | Bandai Namco Games | Fantasy | DS | Turn-based | Digimon | JP |
| 2011 | Disgaea 4: A Promise Unforgotten (EN) 魔界戦記ディスガイア4 (JA) | Nippon Ichi Software | Nippon Ichi Software | | PS3, PSV | Tactical RPG | Disgaea | |
| 2011 | Dragon Age II | BioWare | EA | Fantasy | WIN, PS3, MAC, X360 | Action RPG | Dragon Age | CA |
| 2011 | Dragon Fantasy (EN) | | | | DROID, iOS, PSV | | | |
| 2011 (NA/EU); 2012 (AU) | Dungeon Hunter: Alliance | Gameloft Montreal | Gameloft; Ubisoft | Fantasy | PS3, PSV, MAC | Action RPG | Dungeon Hunter | CA |
| 2011 | Dungeon Siege III (EN) ダンジョン・シージIII (JA) | Obsidian Entertainment | Square Enix | | WIN, PS3, X360 | Action RPG | Dungeon Siege | |
| 2011 | Dungeons & Dragons: Daggerdale (EN) | | Atari | | WIN, PS3 | Action RPG | | |
| 2011 | Dungeons of Dredmor (EN) | Gaslamp Games | | | LIN, WIN, MAC | Roguelike | | |
| 2011 | E.Y.E.: Divine Cybermancy (EN) | Streum On Studio | Streum On Studio | | WIN | FPS | | |
| 2011 | Earth Seeker (EN) アースシーカー (JA) | Crafts & Meister | Enterbrain | | Wii | | | |
| 2011 | The Elder Scrolls V: Skyrim (EN) | Bethesda Game Studios | Bethesda Softworks | Fantasy | WIN, PS3, X360, PS4, XOne, NX | Action RPG, Open world | The Elder Scrolls | US |
| 2011 | Fable III | Lionhead Studios | Microsoft Game Studios | Fantasy | WIN (port) | Action RPG | Fable | UK |
| 2011 | Family Farm (EN) | FunPlus | FunPlus | | WEB | Simulation | | |
| 2011 | Fate: The Cursed King (EN) | | | | WIN | Action RPG | | |
| 2011 | Final Fantasy IV: The Complete Collection (EN) | Square Enix | | | PSP | | Final Fantasy | |
| 2011 | Final Fantasy Type-0 (EN) ファイナルファンタジー零式 (JA) | Square Enix | Square Enix | | WIN, PSP, PS4, XOne | Action RPG | Fabula Nova Crystallis Final Fantasy | |
| 2011 | Final Fantasy XIII-2 (EN) ファイナルファンタジーXIII-2 (JA) | Square Enix | Square Enix | | WIN, PS3, X360 | | Final Fantasy, Fabula Nova Crystallis Final Fantasy | |
| 2011 | Gloria Union (EN) グロリア・ユニオン (JA) | Sting Entertainment | Atlus | | PSP | Tactical RPG | Dept. Heaven | |
| 2011 | Grand Knights History (EN) グランナイツヒストリー (JA) | Vanillaware | Marvelous Entertainment | | PSP | | | |
| 2011 | Green Farm (EN) | Gameloft | | | iOS, DROID | Simulation | | |
| 2011 | Gungnir (EN) グングニル -魔槍の軍神と英雄戦争- (JA) | Sting Entertainment | Atlus | | PSP | Tactical RPG | Dept. Heaven | |
| 2011 | Half-Minute Hero: The Second Coming (EN) 勇者30 SECOND (JA); Yūsha Sanjū II (JA) | | Marvelous Entertainment | | WIN, PSP | Action RPG | | JP |
| 2011 | Hyperdimension Neptunia Mk2 (EN) 超次元ゲイム ネプテューヌmk2 (JA) | Idea Factory | Compile Heart | | PS3 | | Hyperdimension Neptunia | |
| 2011 | Inazuma Eleven GO (EN) イナズマイレブンGO (JA) | Level-5 | Level-5 | | 3DS | | Inazuma Eleven | |
| 2011 | Inazuma Eleven Strikers (EN) イナズマイレブン ストライカーズ (JA) | Level-5 | Nintendo | | Wii | | Inazuma Eleven | |
| 2011 | Inazuma Eleven Strikers 2012 Xtreme (EN) | Level-5 | Level-5 | | Wii | | Inazuma Eleven | |
| 2011 | Infinity Blade II (EN) | Chair Entertainment | | | iOS | Action RPG | | |
| 2011 | Jurassic Park: The Game (EN) | Telltale Games | Telltale Games | | WIN, PS3, MAC, X360, iOS | Adventure | Jurassic Park video games | |
| 2011 | King of Dragon Pass (EN) | A Sharp, LLC | HeroCraft | | DROID, WIN, iOS | | | |
| 2011 (JP); 2012 (NA/PAL) | The Last Story (EN) ラストストーリー (JA) | Mistwalker | Nintendo | Fantasy | Wii | Action RPG | | JP |
| 2011 | Legend of Fae (EN) | | | | WIN | Action RPG | | |
| 2011 | The Legend of Sword and Fairy 5 (EN) | | | | WIN | | | |
| 2011 | The Lord of the Rings: War in the North (EN) | Snowblind Studios | Warner Bros. Interactive Entertainment | | WIN, PS3, MAC, X360 | | The Lord of the Rings | |
| 2011 | Mark Leung (EN) | | | | WIN | | | |
| 2011 (NA/PAL) | Mass Effect 2: Arrival (EN) | BioWare | Electronic Arts | Sci-Fi | WIN, PS3, X360 | Action RPG | Mass Effect | CA |
| 2011 | Mega Man Legends 3 (EN) ロックマンDASH3 PROJECT (JA) | Capcom | Capcom | | 3DS | Action RPG | Mega Man Legends; Cancelled | |
| 2011 (JP); 2013 (NA/PAL) | Monster Hunter 3 Ultimate (EN) モンスターハンター3(トライ) G (JA) | | Capcom | | 3DS, WiiU | Action RPG | Port and remake version of Monster Hunter Tri for Wii. | |
| 2011 | Mount & Blade: With Fire & Sword (EN) | TaleWorlds | Paradox Interactive | | WIN | Action RPG, Open world | Mount & Blade | |
| 2011 | Nadirim (EN) | | | | | MMOG | | |
| 2011 | Ni no Kuni: Wrath of the White Witch | Level-5; Studio Ghibli | Namco Bandai | Fantasy | PS3 (port) | | Port of Ni no Kuni for the DS. | JP |
| 2011 | Nora to Toki no Kōbō: Kiri no Mori no Majo (EN) ノーラと刻の工房 霧の森の魔女 (JA) | | Atlus | | DS | | | |
| 2011 (JP); 2012 (NA/PAL) | Pandora's Tower (EN) パンドラの塔 君のもとへ帰るまで (JA) | Ganbarion | Xseed Games | Fantasy | Wii | Action RPG | | JP |
| 2011 | Pokémon Rumble Blast (EN) スーパーポケモンスクランブル (JA) | Ambrella | Nintendo | | 3DS | Action RPG | | |
| 2011 | Ragnarok Tactics (EN) ラグナロク 〜光と闇の皇女〜 (JA) | GungHo Online Entertainment | Aksys Games | | PSP | Tactical RPG | Ragnarok Online | |
| 2011 | Rudra no Hihō (EN) ルドラの秘宝 (JA) | Square | Square | | VC | | | |
| 2011 | Rusty Hearts (EN) ラスティハーツ (JA) | | Perfect World | | WIN | | | |
| 2011 | Serious Sam: The Random Encounter (EN) | Vlambeer | Devolver Digital | | WIN | Action RPG | Serious Sam | NL |
| 2011 | Shin Megami Tensei: Devil Survivor 2 (EN) デビルサバイバー2 (JA); Debiru Sabaibā Tsū (JA) | Career Soft | Atlus, Ghostlight | | DS | Tactical RPG | Megami Tensei | JP |
| 2011 | Skylanders: Spyro's Adventure (EN) スカイランダーズ スパイロの大冒険 (JA) | Toys For Bob | Activision Publishing, Inc. | | WIN, Wii, PS3, MAC, X360, 3DS | | Skylanders | |
| 2011 | Slime MoriMori Dragon Quest 3: Taikaizoku to Shippo Dan (EN) スライムもりもりドラゴンクエスト3 大海賊としっぽ団 (JA); Suraimu Morimori Doragon Kuesuto 3: Daikaizoku to Shippo Dan (JA) | Square Enix | Square Enix | | 3DS | Action RPG | Slime | JP |
| 2011 | Squids (EN) | The Game Bakers | | | iOS | Tactical RPG | | |
| 2011 | StreetPass Mii Plaza (EN) すれちがいMii広場 (JA) | Nintendo Software Planning & Development | Nintendo | | 3DS | Puzzle video game | | |
| 2011 | Tales of the World: Radiant Mythology 3 (EN) テイルズ オブ ザ ワールド レディアント マイソロジー3 (JA) | Alfa System | Namco | | PSP | Action RPG | Tales | |
| 2011 | Tales of Xillia (EN) テイルズ オブ エクシリア (JA) | Namco Tales Studio | Bandai Namco Entertainment | | PS3 | | Tales | |
| 2011 | Top Eleven Football Manager (EN) | | | | iOS, DROID | Simulation | | |
| 2011 | Tsukumonogatari (EN) つくものがたり (JA) | | | | PSP | Adventure | | |
| 2011 | Unchained Blades (EN) アンチェインブレイズ レクス (JA) | | Xseed Games | | 3DS | | | |
| 2011 | Unepic (EN) | | | | WIN, MAC, WiiU, PS4, XOne | Metroidvania, Platformer | | |
| 2011 | Valkyria Chronicles III (EN) 戦場のヴァルキュリア3 (JA) | Media.Vision | Sega Games | | PSP | Tactical RPG | Valkyria Chronicles | |
| 2011 | Warhammer 40,000: Dawn of War II – Retribution (EN) | Relic Entertainment | THQ | | WIN | RTT, Tactical RPG, RTS | | |
| 2011 | White Knight Chronicles: Origins (EN) | SIE Japan Studio | Sony Interactive Entertainment | | PSP | | White Knight Chronicles | |
| 2011 | The Witcher 2: Assassins of Kings (EN) | CD Projekt Red | CD Projekt | Fantasy | WIN, MAC, X360 | Action RPG | Sequel to The Witcher. Based on the novels of the same name. | Poland |
| 2011 | Zenonia 3 (EN) | Gamevil | Gamevil | | DROID, iOS | Action RPG | | |
| 2011 | Zombie Lane (EN) | Digital Chocolate | | | SNG | Simulation | | |
| 2011 | Zoobles! Spring to Life! (EN) | Now Production | Activision Publishing, Inc. | | DS | Puzzle video game | | |
