= Square Enix Image Studio Division =

Japanese CGI animation studio

- Native name: 株式会社スクウェア・エニックス イメージ・スタジオ部
- Romanized name: Kabushiki-gaisha Sukuwea Enikkusu imēji Sutajio Bu
- Formerly: Visual Works; Image Arts
- Type: Division
- Industry: CGI animation for film, CGI animation for video games, performance capture, Visual effects
- Founded: July 1999; April 1, 2021 (merger)
- Number of locations: Tokyo, Japan
- Key people: Takeshi Nozue (general manager)
- Products: Final Fantasy VII: Advent Children; Kingsglaive: Final Fantasy XV; CG for Square Enix games
- Parent: Square Enix
- Website: jp.square-enix.com/imagestudio/

Square Enix Image Studio Division (Japanese: 株式会社スクウェア・エニックス イメージ・スタジオ部, Hepburn: Kabushiki-gaisha Sukuwea Enikkusu imēji Sutajio Bu) (formerly Visual Works and Image Arts), is a Japan-based CGI animation studio dedicated towards creating video game cut scenes and full-length feature films for Square Enix. Square Enix Image Studio Division was founded as Visual Works, the CGI department for Square that was responsible for creating the pre-rendered CG sequences for the company, starting with Final Fantasy VII in 1997.

Beginning with Final Fantasy VII: Advent Children (2005) the company began to work on stand-alone CGI films, continuing with Kingsglaive: Final Fantasy XV (2016). After the acquisition of Taito and Eidos Interactive by Square Enix, Visual Works branched out their functionality to create cinematic scenes for Square Enix's acquired publishing brands, whilst continuing to primarily work on Square Enix's in-house properties. Visual Works are assisting Square Enix with the lighting and cinematic direction of the Kingdom Hearts franchise for the high definition entries.

In April 2021, Square Enix merged its Visual Works division with its Image Arts Division to create Square Enix Image Studio Division. The Image Arts Division, whose core staff includes members from the team that created the Kingsglaive: Final Fantasy XV, has meanwhile engaged in research and development into high-end visual expression with a focus on real-time graphics.

== History ==
In July 1999, Japanese video game developer and publisher Square founded multiple subsidiaries dedicated to different aspects of production related to its game development. One of these was Square Visual Works, dedicated to computer graphics productions. The staff forming Square Visual Works had previously worked on the company's in-house CGI cutscenes starting with Final Fantasy VII (1997). Among Square Visual Works's first projects under the name were Final Fantasy IX and Parasite Eve II. They have continued to produce video game scenes for the company, remaining a subsidiary under the name Visual Works after the merger of Square and Enix into Square Enix in 2003, and expanded to create cinematic's for more video game franchises after Square Enix acquired Taito and Eidos Interactive. Working at Visual Works is considered to be among the elite of Square Enix technical jobs.

In 2005, Visual Works produced their first stand-alone project, the feature-length CGI film Final Fantasy VII: Advent Children. They produced a second stand-alone film, Kingsglaive: Final Fantasy XV, in 2016.

== Process ==
The studio's creative freedom in creating cutscenes varies from project to project. Director Kazuyuki Ikumori explained in 2015 that some projects allow them complete freedom to decide the direction of the scenes and where they best fit, while others more narrowly define for the studio the length and location of the scene and how it begins and ends. Some projects also consult with the studio on which scenes work better as interactive scenes than passive cutscenes. Visual Works does not try to have different styles based on if a game originates in Japan or Western countries, such as for former Eidos properties, but instead try to match the style of the game series or development studio. Ikumori noted that for some series, such as those by Crystal Dynamics or IO Interactive, they receive a lot of detail about the feeling of the scenes, which they take as a starting point, but for others such as Final Fantasy they know the series so well that they can easily match the developers' intent. Ikumori credits this last to his previous work as a map and character designer for the Final Fantasy series.

Visual Works uses motion capture to design the movements of their CGI characters; Ikumori has described the process as being "really about the center of balance and that transition of balance" than about the exact motions. Especially for more fantasy-oriented series, they use the motion capture data as a basis to overlay with more exaggerated, "flashy" movements that still reflect the way the characters normally move.

=== Demonstration work ===
In 2019, a four and a half-minute trailer titled "Visual Works Character Prototype" was developed of a woman with an eyepatch fighting a doll. Previous demonstrations had been done with Visual Works employees ideas, but Square Enix president Yosuke Matsuda suggested making a demo based on this female character. Starting only with the concept of "a woman with an eyepatch", Visual Works then expanded the world around her to give the character a lot of detail, the kind that would impress prospective game developers. While acknowledging that such projects are time intensive, Kazuyuki Ikumori, the general manager and chief creative director of Visual Works has noted that such projects are already very difficult and expensive, and that such projects get game developers and those making CGI visuals on the same page early on. The video was based on "oriental dark fantasy" as seen by those who do not know Japanese culture, and has elements of Noh such as a Noh mask.

== Works ==
=== Feature films ===
- Final Fantasy VII: Advent Children (2005)
- Kingsglaive: Final Fantasy XV (2016)

=== Video game cutscenes ===
- Final Fantasy VII (1997)
- Parasite Eve (1998)
- Final Fantasy VIII (1999)
- Final Fantasy Collection (Final Fantasy & Final Fantasy II) (1999)
- Final Fantasy Anthology (Final Fantasy V & Final Fantasy VI) (1999)
- Chrono Cross (1999)
- Parasite Eve II (1999)
- Vagrant Story (2000)
- Final Fantasy IX (2000)
- The Bouncer (2000)
- Final Fantasy Chronicles (Final Fantasy IV) (2001)
- Final Fantasy X (2001)
- Final Fantasy XI (2002)
- Kingdom Hearts (2002)
- Final Fantasy X-2 (2003)
- Final Fantasy Origins (2003)
- Final Fantasy XI Online: Rise of Zilart (2007)
- Final Fantasy XI Online: Chains of Promathia (2007)
- Kingdom Hearts II (2005)
- Final Fantasy XI Online: Treasures of Aht Urhgan (2006)
- Dirge of Cerberus: Final Fantasy VII (2006)
- Final Fantasy III (2006)
- Final Fantasy XII (2006)
- Crisis Core: Final Fantasy VII (2007)
- Final Fantasy IV (2007)
- Final Fantasy XIII (2009)
- Kingdom Hearts Birth by Sleep (2010)
- Final Fantasy XIV (2010)
- The 3rd Birthday (2010)
- Final Fantasy IV: The Complete Collection (2011)
- Deus Ex: Human Revolution (2011)
- Final Fantasy Type-0 (2011)
- Final Fantasy XIII-2 (2011)
- Gunslinger Stratos (2012)
- Hitman: Absolution (2012)
- Kingdom Hearts 3D: Dream Drop Distance (2012)
- Tomb Raider (2013)
- Gunslinger Stratos 2 (2013)
- Lightning Returns: Final Fantasy XIII (2013)
- Drakengard 3 (2013)
- Thief (2014)
- Rise of the Tomb Raider (2015)
- Final Fantasy Brave Exvius (2015)
- Densha de Go! (2016)
- Deus Ex: Mankind Divided (2016)
- Final Fantasy XV (2016)
- Valkyrie Anatomia: The Origin (2016)
- Dragon Quest XI: Echoes of an Elusive Age (2017)
- Kingdom Hearts HD 2.8 Final Chapter Prologue (2017)
- Just Cause 4 (2018)
- Dissidia Final Fantasy NT (2018)
- Shadow of the Tomb Raider (2018)
- Kingdom Hearts III (2019)
- Final Fantasy VII Remake (2020)
- Balan Wonderworld (2021)
- Final Fantasy XVI (2023)
- Final Fantasy VII Rebirth (2024)

=== Prototypes ===
- Hatsune Miku x Tetsuya Nomura (2014)
- Visual Works Character Prototype (2018)

== See also ==
- Final Fantasy: The Spirits Within
- Square Pictures
