= List of Final Fantasy video games =

Series of video games

Final Fantasy
- Wordmark used in the individual logos since Final Fantasy IV
- Genre: Role-playing
- Developers: Square; Square Enix
- Publishers: Square; Square Enix
- Creator: Hironobu Sakaguchi
- Producers: Various: Hironobu Sakaguchi; Shinji Hashimoto; Yoshinori Kitase; Tetsuya Nomura; Naoki Yoshida
- Artists: Various: Yoshitaka Amano; Koichi Ishii; Kazuko Shibuya; Yusuke Naora; Tetsuya Nomura; Shūkō Murase; Hiroshi Minagawa; Akihiko Yoshida; Roberto Ferrari
- Composers: Various: Nobuo Uematsu; Masashi Hamauzu; Junya Nakano; Hitoshi Sakimoto; Naoshi Mizuta; Kumi Tanioka; Mitsuto Suzuki; Masayoshi Soken; Yoko Shimomura; Masaharu Iwata; Hidenori Iwasaki; Ryo Yamazaki
- Platform: Various: Arcade; Android; BlackBerry OS; Game Boy; Game Boy Advance; GameCube; Google Stadia; iOS; Java ME; macOS; Microsoft Windows; MSX; Nintendo Entertainment System; Nintendo DS; Nintendo 3DS; Nintendo Switch; Nintendo Switch 2; Ouya; PlayStation; PlayStation 2; PlayStation 3; PlayStation 4; PlayStation 5; PlayStation Portable; PlayStation Vita; Super Nintendo Entertainment System; Wii; Windows Phone; WonderSwan; Xbox 360; Xbox One; Xbox Series X/S
- First release: Final Fantasy; December 18, 1987
- Latest release: Final Fantasy Resonance; October 22, 2026
- Spin-offs: Mana; Kingdom Hearts; Bravely Default

Final Fantasy is a video game series developed and published by Square Enix (formerly Square). The first installment in the series, the eponymous Final Fantasy, premiered in Japan in 1987, and Final Fantasy games have been released almost every single year since. Sixteen games have been released as part of the main (numbered) series. Sequels, prequels, spin-offs, and related video games have been published, as well as numerous installments in other media forms. Each game in the main series takes place in a different fictional universe rather than serving as direct sequels to prior games, although some games have received sequels, or prequels, set in the same universe.

Most of the games have been re-released for several different platforms, many of which have been included in bundled releases. The series as a whole is primarily composed of role-playing video games, but also includes massively multiplayer online role-playing games, third-person shooters, tower defense games, and tactical role-playing games. Final Fantasy games have been released on over a dozen video game consoles beginning with the Nintendo Entertainment System, as well as for personal computers and mobile phones. The series is Square Enix's most successful franchise, having sold over 203 million units worldwide as of July 2025, across both the main series and its spin-offs. Final Fantasy's popularity has placed it as one of the best-selling video game franchises.

== Main series ==
Main series release timeline
1987	Final Fantasy
1988	Final Fantasy II
1989
1990	Final Fantasy III
1991	Final Fantasy IV
1992	Final Fantasy V
1993
1994	Final Fantasy VI
1995–1996
1997	Final Fantasy VII
1998
1999	Final Fantasy VIII
2000	Final Fantasy IX
2001	Final Fantasy X
2002	Final Fantasy XI
2003–2005
2006	Final Fantasy XII
2007–2008
2009	Final Fantasy XIII
2010	Final Fantasy XIV (original)
2011–2012
2013	Final Fantasy XIV (reboot)
2014–2015
2016	Final Fantasy XV
2017–2022
2023	Final Fantasy XVI

Main series games
Game	Details
Final Fantasy Original release dates: JP: December 18, 1987; NA: July 12, 1990; PAL: March 14, 2003 (PlayStation version)	Release years by system: 1987 – Family Computer; 1989 – MSX2; 1990 – Nintendo Entertainment System; 2000 – WonderSwan Color; 2002 – PlayStation; 2004 – Game Boy Advance; 2004 – Mobile phones 2007 – PlayStation Portable (Final Fantasy Anniversary Edition); 2010 – iOS; 2012 – Windows Phone; 2012 – Android; 2021 – Android, iOS, Steam (Final Fantasy Pixel Remaster); 2023 – Nintendo Switch, PlayStation 4 (Final Fantasy Pixel Remaster); 2024 – Xbox Series X/S (Final Fantasy Pixel Remaster)
Final Fantasy Original release dates: JP: December 18, 1987; NA: July 12, 1990; PAL: March 14, 2003 (PlayStation version)	Notes: Included in the Final Fantasy I-II (Family Computer, 1994), Final Fantasy Origins (PlayStation, 2002), and Final Fantasy I & II: Dawn of Souls (Game Boy Advance, 2004) bundles, and the Final Fantasy Mobile (Mobile phones, 2004) subseries.; NES version available on the Wii Virtual Console in Japan, North America, & Europe/Australia; also available on the Wii U & Nintendo 3DS Virtual Consoles in Japan.; PS1 Classic available on the PlayStation Store to download for the PlayStation 3, PlayStation Vita, and PlayStation Portable in Japan and North America.; Game Boy Advance version available on the Wii U Virtual Console in Japan.; Included in the Nintendo Classic Mini.
Final Fantasy II Original release dates: JP: December 17, 1988; NA: April 8, 2003 (PlayStation version); PAL: March 14, 2003 (PlayStation version)	Release years by system: 1988 – Family Computer; 2001 – WonderSwan Color; 2002 – PlayStation; 2004 – Game Boy Advance; 2005 – Mobile phones 2007 – PlayStation Portable (Final Fantasy II Anniversary Edition); 2010 – iOS; 2012 – Android; 2021 – Android, iOS, Steam (Final Fantasy II Pixel Remaster); 2023 – Nintendo Switch, PlayStation 4 (Final Fantasy II Pixel Remaster); 2024 – Xbox Series X/S (Final Fantasy II Pixel Remaster)
Final Fantasy II Original release dates: JP: December 17, 1988; NA: April 8, 2003 (PlayStation version); PAL: March 14, 2003 (PlayStation version)	Notes: Included in the Final Fantasy I-II (Family Computer, 1994), Final Fantasy Origins (PlayStation, 2002), and Final Fantasy I & II: Dawn of Souls (Game Boy Advance, 2004) bundles, and the Final Fantasy Mobile (Mobile phones, 2005) subseries.; Famicom version available on the Wii, Wii U, and Nintendo 3DS Virtual Consoles in Japan.; PS1 Classic available on the PlayStation Store to download for the PlayStation 3, PlayStation Vita, and PlayStation Portable in Japan and North America.; Game Boy Advance version available on the Wii U Virtual Console in Japan.
Final Fantasy III Original release dates: JP: April 27, 1990; NA: November 14, 2006 (Nintendo DS version); PAL: May 4, 2007 (Nintendo DS version)	Release years by system: 1990 – Family Computer; 2006 – Nintendo DS; 2011 – iOS; 2012 – PlayStation Portable; 2012 – Android; 2013 – Ouya; 2013 – Windows Phone; 2014 – Microsoft Windows, Steam (Final Fantasy III 3D Remake); 2021 – Android, iOS, Steam (Final Fantasy III Pixel Remaster); 2023 – Nintendo Switch, PlayStation 4 (Final Fantasy III Pixel Remaster); 2024 – Xbox Series X/S (Final Fantasy III Pixel Remaster)
Final Fantasy III Original release dates: JP: April 27, 1990; NA: November 14, 2006 (Nintendo DS version); PAL: May 4, 2007 (Nintendo DS version)	Notes: Nintendo DS, iOS, PSP, Android, Ouya, Windows Phone, PC versions and one of the Steam versions are a full remake of the game with 3D graphics and additional content.; Famicom version available on the Wii, Wii U, and Nintendo 3DS Virtual Consoles in Japan.
Final Fantasy IV Original release dates: JP: July 19, 1991; NA: November 23, 1991; PAL: February 27, 2002 (PlayStation version)	Release years by system: 1991 – Super NES; 1991 – Super Famicom (Final Fantasy IV Easy Type); 1997 – PlayStation; 2002 – WonderSwan Color; 2005 – Game Boy Advance (Final Fantasy IV Advance); 2007 – Nintendo DS; 2009 – Mobile phones 2011 – PlayStation Portable (Final Fantasy IV: The Complete Collection); 2012 – iOS; 2013 – Android; 2014 – Microsoft Windows; 2021 – Android, iOS, Steam (Final Fantasy IV Pixel Remaster); 2023 – Nintendo Switch, PlayStation 4 (Final Fantasy IV Pixel Remaster); 2024 – Xbox Series X/S (Final Fantasy IV Pixel Remaster)
Final Fantasy IV Original release dates: JP: July 19, 1991; NA: November 23, 1991; PAL: February 27, 2002 (PlayStation version)	Notes: First released in North America under the name Final Fantasy II on the Super NES; later releases of the game were under the Final Fantasy IV title.; Re-released on the Super Famicom in Japan under the title Final Fantasy IV Easy Type with an easier difficulty setting.; Included in the Final Fantasy Collection (1999, PlayStation) and Final Fantasy Chronicles (2001, PlayStation) bundles, and the European release of the Final Fantasy Anthology (2002, PlayStation) bundle, as well as the Finest Fantasy for Advance subseries (2005, Game Boy Advance).; Nintendo DS, Android, iOS and PC versions are a full remake of the game with 3D graphics and additional content.; PSP version of the game is a bundle of the original game, its sequel Final Fantasy IV: The After Years, and Final Fantasy IV Interlude, an all-new story that is a tie-in between the other two games.; Super NES version available on the Wii Virtual Console in Japan, North America, and Europe/Australia; Super NES and Game Boy Advance versions also available on the Wii U Virtual Console in Japan.; PS1 Classic available on the PlayStation Store to download for the PlayStation 3, PlayStation Vita, and PlayStation Portable in Japan only.
Final Fantasy V Original release dates: JP: December 6, 1992; NA: October 5, 1999 (PlayStation version); PAL: February 27, 2002 (PlayStation version)	Release years by system: 1992 – Super Famicom; 1998 – PlayStation; 2006 – Game Boy Advance (Final Fantasy V Advance); 2013 – iOS; 2013 – Android; 2015 – Microsoft Windows; 2021 – Android, iOS, Steam (Final Fantasy V Pixel Remaster); 2023 – Nintendo Switch, PlayStation 4 (Final Fantasy V Pixel Remaster); 2024 – Xbox Series X/S (Final Fantasy V Pixel Remaster)
Final Fantasy V Original release dates: JP: December 6, 1992; NA: October 5, 1999 (PlayStation version); PAL: February 27, 2002 (PlayStation version)	Notes: Included in the Final Fantasy Collection (1999, PlayStation) and the Final Fantasy Anthology (1999, PlayStation) bundles, as well as the Finest Fantasy for Advance subseries (2006, Game Boy Advance).; Super Famicom version available on the Wii and Wii U Virtual Consoles in Japan, and Game Boy Advance version available on the Wii U Virtual Console in Japan.; PS1 Classic available on the PlayStation Store to download for the PlayStation 3, PlayStation Vita, and PlayStation Portable.; Anime OVA Final Fantasy: Legend of the Crystals takes place 200 years after the events of Final Fantasy V.
Final Fantasy VI Original release dates: JP: April 2, 1994; NA: October 11, 1994; PAL: March 1, 2002 (PlayStation version)	Release years by system: 1994 – Super NES; 1999 – PlayStation; 2006 – Game Boy Advance (Final Fantasy VI Advance); 2014 – Android; 2014 – iOS; 2015 – Microsoft Windows; 2022 – Android, iOS, Steam (Final Fantasy VI Pixel Remaster); 2023 – Nintendo Switch, PlayStation 4 (Final Fantasy VI Pixel Remaster); 2024 – Xbox Series X/S (Final Fantasy VI Pixel Remaster)
Final Fantasy VI Original release dates: JP: April 2, 1994; NA: October 11, 1994; PAL: March 1, 2002 (PlayStation version)	Notes: First released in North America under the name Final Fantasy III on the Super NES; later releases of the game were under the Final Fantasy VI title.; Included in the Final Fantasy Collection (1999, PlayStation) and the North American release of the Final Fantasy Anthology (1999, PlayStation) bundles, as well as the Finest Fantasy for Advance subseries (2006, Game Boy Advance).; Super NES version available on the Wii Virtual Console in Japan, North America and Europe/Australia; Super NES and Game Boy Advance versions also available on the Wii U Virtual Console in Japan.; PS1 Classic available on the PlayStation Store to download for the PlayStation 3, PlayStation Vita and PlayStation Portable.; Included in the Super NES Classic Edition under the name Final Fantasy III.
Final Fantasy VII Original release dates: JP: January 31, 1997; NA: September 7, 1997; PAL: November 1, 1997	Release years by system: 1997 – PlayStation; 1997 – PlayStation (Final Fantasy VII International); 1998 – Microsoft Windows; 2012 – Microsoft Windows; 2015 – iOS; 2015 – PlayStation 4; 2016 – Android; 2019 – Nintendo Switch, Xbox One
Final Fantasy VII Original release dates: JP: January 31, 1997; NA: September 7, 1997; PAL: November 1, 1997	Notes: International version released in Japan for the PlayStation (1997, titled Final Fantasy VII International).; PS1 Classic available on the PlayStation Store to download for the PlayStation 3, PlayStation Vita and PlayStation Portable.; Microsoft Windows version re-released in 2012 with upscaled graphics and additional features.; Japanese release of Microsoft Windows version in 2013 includes features that were later included in the iOS, PS4 and Android ports but remain exclusive to Japan for the PC version.
Final Fantasy VIII Original release dates: JP: February 11, 1999; NA: September 9, 1999; PAL: October 27, 1999	Release years by system: 1999 – PlayStation; 2000 – Microsoft Windows; 2013 – Microsoft Windows; 2019 – Microsoft Windows, Nintendo Switch, PlayStation 4, Xbox One (Final Fantasy VIII Remastered); 2021 – Android, iOS (Final Fantasy VIII Remastered)
Final Fantasy VIII Original release dates: JP: February 11, 1999; NA: September 9, 1999; PAL: October 27, 1999	Notes: PS1 Classic available on the PlayStation Store to download for the PlayStation 3, PlayStation Vita and PlayStation Portable.
Final Fantasy IX Original release dates: JP: July 7, 2000; NA: November 13, 2000; PAL: February 16, 2001	Release years by system: 2000 – PlayStation; 2016 – Microsoft Windows, Android, iOS; 2017 – PlayStation 4; 2019 – Nintendo Switch, Xbox One
Final Fantasy IX Original release dates: JP: July 7, 2000; NA: November 13, 2000; PAL: February 16, 2001	Notes: Card minigame from Final Fantasy IX, "Tetra Master", was available on Square Enix's PlayOnline network service until December 31, 2010, featuring player versus player games.; PS1 Classic available on the PlayStation Store to download for the PlayStation 3, PlayStation Vita and PlayStation Portable.
Final Fantasy X Original release dates: JP: July 19, 2001; NA: December 17, 2001; PAL: May 24, 2002	Release years by system: 2001 – PlayStation 2; 2002 – PlayStation 2 (Final Fantasy X International); 2013 – PlayStation 3, PlayStation Vita (Final Fantasy X/X-2 HD Remaster); 2015 – PlayStation 4 (Final Fantasy X/X-2 HD Remaster); 2016 – Microsoft Windows (Final Fantasy X/X-2 HD Remaster); 2019 – Nintendo Switch, Xbox One (Final Fantasy X/X-2 HD Remaster); 2026 – Nintendo Switch 2 (Final Fantasy X/X-2 HD Remaster)
Final Fantasy X Original release dates: JP: July 19, 2001; NA: December 17, 2001; PAL: May 24, 2002	Notes: International version released in Japan for the PlayStation 2 (2002, titled Final Fantasy X International), containing a short film that bridges the story of Final Fantasy X with that of its sequel, Final Fantasy X-2.; Included in the Final Fantasy X/X-2 Ultimate Box bundle (2005).
Final Fantasy XI: Online Original release dates: JP: May 16, 2002; NA: October 28, 2003 (PC version); PAL: September 16, 2004 (PC version)	Release years by system: 2002 – PlayStation 2, Microsoft Windows; 2006 – Xbox 360
Final Fantasy XI: Online Original release dates: JP: May 16, 2002; NA: October 28, 2003 (PC version); PAL: September 16, 2004 (PC version)	Notes: First massively multiplayer online role-playing game in the series.; Five expansion packs have been released: Rise of the Zilart (2003), Chains of Promathia (2004), Treasures of Aht Urhgan (2006), Wings of the Goddess (2007), and Seekers of Adoulin (2013).; Six add-ons, or small expansions, have been released: A Crystalline Prophecy (March 2009), A Moogle Kupo d'Etat (July 2009), A Shantotto Ascension (October 2009), Vision of Abyssea (June 2010), Scars of Abyssea (August 2010), and Heroes of Abyssea (November 2010).; Two main scenario packs have been released: Rhapsodies of Vana'diel (2015), and The Voracious Resurgence (2020).; First expansion was included in the North American release (2003).; First two expansions were included in the European release (2004).; First three expansions were included in the Xbox 360 release (2006).; Final Fantasy XI: The Vana'diel Collection includes the game and the first two expansions.; Final Fantasy XI: The Vana'diel Collection 2007 includes the game and the first three expansions.; Final Fantasy XI: The Vana'diel Collection 2008 includes the game and the first four expansions.; Final Fantasy XI: Ultimate Collection (2010) includes the game, the first four expansions, and the first three add-ons.; Final Fantasy XI: Ultimate Collection Abyssea Edition (2011) includes the game, the first four expansions, and all six add-ons.; Final Fantasy XI: Ultimate Collection Seeker's Edition (2013) includes the game, all five expansions, and all six add-ons.; Final Fantasy XI terminated for the Xbox 360 and PlayStation 2 on March 31, 2016.
Final Fantasy XII Original release dates: JP: March 16, 2006; NA: October 31, 2006; PAL: February 23, 2007	Release years by system: 2006 – PlayStation 2; 2007 – PlayStation 2 (Final Fantasy XII International Zodiac Job System); 2017 – PlayStation 4 (Final Fantasy XII: The Zodiac Age); 2018 – Microsoft Windows (Final Fantasy XII: The Zodiac Age); 2019 – Nintendo Switch, Xbox One (Final Fantasy XII: The Zodiac Age)
Final Fantasy XII Original release dates: JP: March 16, 2006; NA: October 31, 2006; PAL: February 23, 2007	Notes: International version released in Japan for the PlayStation 2 (2007, titled Final Fantasy XII International Zodiac Job System).; International version is part of the Ivalice Alliance subseries.
Final Fantasy XIII Original release dates: JP: December 17, 2009; NA: March 9, 2010; PAL: March 9, 2010	Release years by system: 2009 – PlayStation 3, Xbox 360; 2010 – Xbox 360 (Final Fantasy XIII Ultimate Hits International); 2014 – PC
Final Fantasy XIII Original release dates: JP: December 17, 2009; NA: March 9, 2010; PAL: March 9, 2010	Notes: Part of the Fabula Nova Crystallis Final Fantasy subseries.; International version released in Japan for the Xbox 360 (2010, titled Final Fantasy XIII Ultimate Hits International).; Only Final Fantasy game on the PlayStation 3 not available on the PlayStation Store.
Final Fantasy XIV: Online Original release date: WW: September 30, 2010	Release years by system: 2010 – Microsoft Windows
Final Fantasy XIV: Online Original release date: WW: September 30, 2010	Notes: Second massively multiplayer online role-playing game in the series.; Original version terminated on November 11, 2012; relaunched as Final Fantasy XIV: A Realm Reborn on August 27, 2013.
Final Fantasy XIV: A Realm Reborn Original release date: WW: August 27, 2013	Release years by system: 2013 – Microsoft Windows, PlayStation 3; 2014 – PlayStation 4; 2015 – macOS; 2021 – PlayStation 5; 2024 – Xbox Series X/S; 2026 – Nintendo Switch 2
Final Fantasy XIV: A Realm Reborn Original release date: WW: August 27, 2013	Notes: Relaunch of Final Fantasy XIV, rebuilt with a new engine, gameplay and server after the negative reception of the original version.; Five expansion packs have been released: Heavensward (2015), Stormblood (2017), Shadowbringers (2019), Endwalker (2021) and Dawntrail (2024). A sixth expansion pack, Evercold, was announced for a 2027 release.; Final Fantasy XIV terminated on PlayStation 3 in June 2017.
Final Fantasy XV Original release date: WW: November 29, 2016	Release years by system: 2016 – PlayStation 4, Xbox One; 2018 – Microsoft Windows (Final Fantasy XV: Windows Edition); 2019 – Stadia
Final Fantasy XV Original release date: WW: November 29, 2016	Notes: Announced at E3 2006 as Final Fantasy Versus XIII.; Originally part of the Fabula Nova Crystallis Final Fantasy subseries.; First mainline single-player Final Fantasy to have a global release date.; DLC expansions titled Episode Gladiolus, Episode Prompto and Episode Ignis released in 2017.; Online cooperative multiplayer expansion titled Final Fantasy XV: Comrades released in 2017, and later released as a standalone game in 2018.; Royal Edition with all previous updates, DLC and new contents released in 2018 for the PlayStation 4 and Xbox One.; DLC expansions titled Episode Aranea, Episode Luna and Episode Noctis cancelled in 2018.; DLC expansion titled Episode Ardyn released in 2019 together with short animated prologue Final Fantasy XV: Episode Ardyn – Prologue.
Final Fantasy XVI Original release date: WW: June 22, 2023	Release years by system: 2023 – PlayStation 5; 2024 – Microsoft Windows; 2025 – Xbox Series X/S
Final Fantasy XVI Original release date: WW: June 22, 2023	Notes: Announced during the PlayStation 5 showcase event in 2020.; DLC expansion titled Echoes of the Fallen released in 2023.; DLC expansion titled The Rising Tide released in 2024.

== Main series-related games ==
Main series-related games
Game	Details
Final Fantasy X-2 Original release dates: JP: March 13, 2003; NA: November 18, 2003; PAL: February 20, 2004	Release years by system: 2003 – PlayStation 2; 2004 – PlayStation 2 (Final Fantasy X-2 International + Last Mission); 2013 – PlayStation 3, PlayStation Vita (Final Fantasy X/X-2 HD Remaster); 2015 – PlayStation 4 (Final Fantasy X/X-2 HD Remaster); 2016 – PC (Steam) (Final Fantasy X/X-2 HD Remaster); 2019 – Nintendo Switch, Xbox One (Final Fantasy X/X-2 HD Remaster)
Final Fantasy X-2 Original release dates: JP: March 13, 2003; NA: November 18, 2003; PAL: February 20, 2004	Notes: Sequel to Final Fantasy X.; First direct video game sequel in the series.; Included in the Final Fantasy X/X-2 Ultimate Box bundle (2005).
Final Fantasy X-2: Last Mission Original release date: JP: February 9th, 2004; NA: March 18, 2014; PAL: March 21, 2014	Release years by system: 2004 – PlayStation 2 (Final Fantasy X-2 International + Last Mission); 2013 – PlayStation 3, PlayStation Vita (Final Fantasy X/X-2 HD Remaster); 2015 – PlayStation 4 (Final Fantasy X/X-2 HD Remaster); 2016 – PC (Steam) (Final Fantasy X/X-2 HD Remaster); 2019 – Nintendo Switch, Xbox One (Final Fantasy X/X-2 HD Remaster)
Final Fantasy X-2: Last Mission Original release date: JP: February 9th, 2004; NA: March 18, 2014; PAL: March 21, 2014	Notes: Additional mission at a new location.; Originally released exclusively in Japan in 2004 as a bonus for Final Fantasy X-2: International + Last Mission.; Included in Final Fantasy X/X-2 HD Remaster, making it available for English speakers for the first time in 2014.
Final Fantasy IV: The After Years Original release dates: JP: February 18, 2008; NA: June 1, 2009 (WiiWare version); PAL: June 5, 2009 (WiiWare version)	Release years by system: 2008 – Mobile phones 2009 – WiiWare; 2011 – PlayStation Portable (Final Fantasy IV: The Complete Collection); 2013 – Android, iOS; 2015 – PC (Steam)
Final Fantasy IV: The After Years Original release dates: JP: February 18, 2008; NA: June 1, 2009 (WiiWare version); PAL: June 5, 2009 (WiiWare version)	Notes: Sequel to Final Fantasy IV.; Released in episodic format.; PSP version of the game is a bundle of the original game, its sequel Final Fantasy IV: The After Years, and Final Fantasy IV Interlude, an all-new story that is a tie-in between the other two games.; iOS, Android and PC versions are a full remake of the game in the style of the remakes of Final Fantasy III and IV.
Final Fantasy Grandmasters Original release date: JP: September 30, 2015	Release years by system: 2015 – Android, iOS
Final Fantasy Grandmasters Original release date: JP: September 30, 2015	Notes: Spin-off of Final Fantasy XI.; Terminated on April 25, 2019.
Stranger of Paradise: Final Fantasy Origin Original release date: WW: March 18, 2022	Release years by system: 2022 – PlayStation 4, PlayStation 5, Microsoft Windows, Xbox One, Xbox Series X/S
Stranger of Paradise: Final Fantasy Origin Original release date: WW: March 18, 2022	Notes: Alternate universe prequel of the original Final Fantasy.

=== Ivalice Alliance ===
Final Fantasy Tactics games
Game	Details
Final Fantasy Tactics Original release dates: JP: June 20, 1997; NA: January 28, 1998; WW: September 30, 2025	Release years by system: 1997 – PlayStation; 2025 – Nintendo Switch, Nintendo Switch 2, PlayStation 4, PlayStation 5, Microsoft Windows, Xbox Series X/S (Final Fantasy Tactics: The Ivalice Chronicles)
Final Fantasy Tactics Original release dates: JP: June 20, 1997; NA: January 28, 1998; WW: September 30, 2025	Notes: Tactical role-playing game featuring concepts and themes from the Final Fantasy series.; Set in the world of Ivalice, which was later reused in main series game Final Fantasy XII.; PS1 Classic available on the PlayStation Store to download for the PlayStation 3, PlayStation Vita and PlayStation Portable in Japan and North America.; Remastered version released as Final Fantasy Tactics: The Ivalice Chronicles, making it available outside of Japan and North America for the first time in 2025
Final Fantasy Tactics Advance Original release dates: JP: February 14, 2003; NA: September 8, 2003; PAL: October 24, 2003	Release years by system: 2003 – Game Boy Advance; 2016 – Wii U Virtual Console
Final Fantasy Tactics Advance Original release dates: JP: February 14, 2003; NA: September 8, 2003; PAL: October 24, 2003	Notes: Tactical role-playing game featuring concepts and themes from the Final Fantasy series.; Not a sequel to Final Fantasy Tactics.; Set in a dream version of Ivalice, which features places, characters, and races later to be seen in main series game Final Fantasy XII.; Available on the Wii U Virtual Console in North America, Europe/Australia and Japan.
Final Fantasy Tactics: The War of the Lions Original release dates: JP: May 10, 2007; PAL: October 5, 2007; NA: October 9, 2007	Release years by system: 2007 – PlayStation Portable; 2011 – iOS; 2015 – Android
Final Fantasy Tactics: The War of the Lions Original release dates: JP: May 10, 2007; PAL: October 5, 2007; NA: October 9, 2007	Notes: Updated version of Final Fantasy Tactics.; Tactical role-playing game featuring concepts and themes from the Final Fantasy series.; Set in the world of Ivalice, which was used in main series game Final Fantasy XII.
Final Fantasy Tactics A2: Grimoire of the Rift Original release dates: JP: October 25, 2007; NA: June 24, 2008; PAL: June 27, 2008	Release years by system: 2007 – Nintendo DS
Final Fantasy Tactics A2: Grimoire of the Rift Original release dates: JP: October 25, 2007; NA: June 24, 2008; PAL: June 27, 2008	Notes: Tactical role-playing game featuring concepts and themes from the Final Fantasy series.; Sequel to Final Fantasy Tactics Advance, though set in the real version of Ivalice.; Part of the Ivalice Alliance subseries.
Final Fantasy XII: Revenant Wings Original release dates: JP: April 26, 2007; NA: November 20, 2007; PAL: February 15, 2008	Release years by system: 2007 – Nintendo DS
Final Fantasy XII: Revenant Wings Original release dates: JP: April 26, 2007; NA: November 20, 2007; PAL: February 15, 2008	Notes: Sequel to Final Fantasy XII.; Part of the Ivalice Alliance subseries.
Fortress Cancellation date: 2011	Proposed system release:
Fortress Cancellation date: 2011	Notes: Spin-off sequel of Final Fantasy XII initially developed by GRIN before being handed over to another, undisclosed studio and subsequently cancelled.
Final Fantasy Tactics S Original release dates: JP: May 28, 2013	Release years by system: 2013 – iOS, Android
Final Fantasy Tactics S Original release dates: JP: May 28, 2013	Notes: Tactical role-playing game with social features and multiplayer battles.; Terminated on July 31, 2014.

=== Compilation of Final Fantasy VII ===
Compilation of Final Fantasy VII
Game	Details
Before Crisis: Final Fantasy VII Original release date: JP: September 29, 2004	Release years by system: 2004 – Mobile phones
Before Crisis: Final Fantasy VII Original release date: JP: September 29, 2004	Notes: Released on NTT DoCoMo FOMA iMode mobile phones, SoftBank Yahoo! mobile phones, and au EZweb mobile phones in Japan.; Prequel to Final Fantasy VII, detailing the dealings between the original AVALANCHE organization and the Turks.; Part of the Compilation of Final Fantasy VII subseries.; No longer available to download, with Final Fantasy Mobile ending on March 31, 2018.
Final Fantasy VII Snowboarding Original release dates: NA/JP: March 29, 2005	Release years by system: 2005 – Mobile phones
Final Fantasy VII Snowboarding Original release dates: NA/JP: March 29, 2005	Notes: Port of the snowboarding minigame featured in Final Fantasy VII to mobile phones.; No longer available to download, with Final Fantasy Mobile ending on March 31, 2018.
Dirge of Cerberus: Final Fantasy VII Original release dates: JP: January 26, 2006; NA: August 15, 2006; PAL: November 17, 2006	Release years by system: 2006 – PlayStation 2; 2008 – PlayStation 2 (Dirge of Cerberus: Final Fantasy VII International)
Dirge of Cerberus: Final Fantasy VII Original release dates: JP: January 26, 2006; NA: August 15, 2006; PAL: November 17, 2006	Notes: Third-person shooter with role-playing game elements.; Sequel to Final Fantasy VII, taking place three years after the game.; International version released in Japan (2008, PlayStation 2).; Part of the Compilation of Final Fantasy VII subseries.
Dirge of Cerberus Lost Episode: Final Fantasy VII Original release dates: JP: August 18, 2006; NA: August 22, 2006	Release years by system: 2006 – Mobile phones
Dirge of Cerberus Lost Episode: Final Fantasy VII Original release dates: JP: August 18, 2006; NA: August 22, 2006	Notes: Released for Japanese mobile phones on August 18, 2006, taking place midway through Dirge of Cerberus: Final Fantasy VII.; Part of the Compilation of Final Fantasy VII subseries.; No longer available to download, with Final Fantasy Mobile ending on March 31, 2018.
Crisis Core: Final Fantasy VII Original release dates: JP: September 13, 2007; NA: March 25, 2008; PAL: June 26, 2008	Release years by system: 2007 – PlayStation Portable
Crisis Core: Final Fantasy VII Original release dates: JP: September 13, 2007; NA: March 25, 2008; PAL: June 26, 2008	Notes: Prequel to Final Fantasy VII, chronicling the events leading up to the game.; Part of the Compilation of Final Fantasy VII subseries.; Only Final Fantasy game on the PlayStation Portable not available on the PlayStation Store.
Final Fantasy VII G-Bike Original release date: JP: October 30, 2014	Release years by system: 2014 – Android, iOS
Final Fantasy VII G-Bike Original release date: JP: October 30, 2014	Notes: International release cancelled.; Terminated on December 15, 2015.
Final Fantasy VII Remake Original release date: WW: April 10, 2020	Release years by system: 2020 – PlayStation 4; 2021 – PlayStation 5, Microsoft Windows (Final Fantasy VII Remake Intergrade); 2026 – Nintendo Switch 2, Xbox Series X/S (Final Fantasy VII Remake Intergrade)
Final Fantasy VII Remake Original release date: WW: April 10, 2020	Notes: First in a planned trilogy of games remaking the 1997 PlayStation game Final Fantasy VII.; Upgraded version titled Final Fantasy VII Remake Intergrade with Episode Intermission DLC expansion and all previous updates released in 2021 for the PlayStation 5.
Final Fantasy VII: The First Soldier Original release date: WW: November 17, 2021	Release years by system: 2021 – Android, iOS
Final Fantasy VII: The First Soldier Original release date: WW: November 17, 2021	Notes: Battle Royale prequel.; Terminated on January 11, 2023.
Crisis Core: Final Fantasy VII Reunion Original release date: WW: December 13, 2022	Release years by system: 2022 – Microsoft Windows, Nintendo Switch, PlayStation 4, PlayStation 5, Xbox One, Xbox Series X/S
Crisis Core: Final Fantasy VII Reunion Original release date: WW: December 13, 2022	Notes: Full remaster of the 2007 PlayStation Portable game Crisis Core: Final Fantasy VII.
Final Fantasy VII: Ever Crisis Original release dates: WW: September 7, 2023	Release years by system: 2023 – Android, iOS, Microsoft Windows
Final Fantasy VII: Ever Crisis Original release dates: WW: September 7, 2023	Notes: Planned to be released in monthly episodic installments.; Retells the events from Final Fantasy VII and all other titles in the Compilation of Final Fantasy VII.
Final Fantasy VII Rebirth Original release dates: WW: February 29, 2024	Release years by system: 2024 – PlayStation 5; 2025 – Microsoft Windows; 2026 – Nintendo Switch 2, Xbox Series X/S
Final Fantasy VII Rebirth Original release dates: WW: February 29, 2024	Notes: Announced at the Final Fantasy VII 25th anniversary celebration in 2022.; Second in a planned trilogy of games remaking the 1997 PlayStation game Final Fantasy VII.
Final Fantasy VII Revelation Original release dates: 2027	Release years by system: 2027 – Nintendo Switch 2, PlayStation 5, Microsoft Windows, Xbox Series X/S
Final Fantasy VII Revelation Original release dates: 2027	Notes: Announced at the 2026 Summer Game Fest.; Third in a planned trilogy of games remaking the 1997 PlayStation game Final Fantasy VII.; First main Final Fantasy game to launch on a Nintendo console since Final Fantasy VI, which launched on the Super NES in 1994.

=== Fabula Nova Crystallis Final Fantasy ===
Fabula Nova Crystallis Final Fantasy
Game	Details
Final Fantasy Type-0 Original release dates: JP: October 27, 2011; WW: March 17, 2015 (HD only)	Release years by system: 2011 – PlayStation Portable; 2015 – PlayStation 4, Xbox One, PC (Steam) (Final Fantasy Type-0 HD)
Final Fantasy Type-0 Original release dates: JP: October 27, 2011; WW: March 17, 2015 (HD only)	Notes: Originally titled Final Fantasy Agito XIII.; Square Enix describes it as an online RPG, but not a massively multiplayer online role-playing game.; Takes place in different universe from Final Fantasy XIII, but features a similar mythology.; Part of the Fabula Nova Crystallis Final Fantasy subseries.
Final Fantasy XIII-2 Original release dates: JP: December 15, 2011; NA: January 31, 2012; PAL: February 3, 2012	Release years by system: 2011 – PlayStation 3, Xbox 360; 2014 – PC (Steam); 2015 – iOS, Android
Final Fantasy XIII-2 Original release dates: JP: December 15, 2011; NA: January 31, 2012; PAL: February 3, 2012	Notes: Direct sequel to Final Fantasy XIII.; Part of the Fabula Nova Crystallis Final Fantasy subseries.
Lightning Returns: Final Fantasy XIII Original release dates: JP: November 21, 2013; NA: February 11, 2014; AU: February 13, 2014; PAL: February 14, 2014	Release years by system: 2013 – PlayStation 3, Xbox 360; 2015 – PC (Steam); 2016 – Android, iOS
Lightning Returns: Final Fantasy XIII Original release dates: JP: November 21, 2013; NA: February 11, 2014; AU: February 13, 2014; PAL: February 14, 2014	Notes: Direct sequel to Final Fantasy XIII and Final Fantasy XIII-2.; Part of the Fabula Nova Crystallis Final Fantasy subseries.
Final Fantasy Agito Original release date: JP: May 14, 2014	Release years by system: 2014 – Android, iOS
Final Fantasy Agito Original release date: JP: May 14, 2014	Notes: Mobile spin-off of Final Fantasy Type-0.; Part of the Fabula Nova Crystallis Final Fantasy subseries.; Terminated in November 2015.; International release cancelled.
Final Fantasy Awakening Original release date: CHN: December 14, 2016; WW: August 15, 2017	Release years by system: 2016 – Android, iOS
Final Fantasy Awakening Original release date: CHN: December 14, 2016; WW: August 15, 2017	Notes: Part of the Fabula Nova Crystallis Final Fantasy subseries.; Announced under the provisional title Final Fantasy Type-0 Online.; Terminated, English version closed in 2019 and all other versions shut down in May 2020.

=== Final Fantasy XV Universe ===
Final Fantasy XV Universe
Game	Details
Platinum Demo – Final Fantasy XV Original release date: WW: March 30, 2016	Release years by system: 2016 – PlayStation 4 (PlayStation Store), Xbox One (Microsoft Store)
Platinum Demo – Final Fantasy XV Original release date: WW: March 30, 2016	Notes: Free-to-play prologue to Final Fantasy XV.; Delisted from the PlayStation Store and Microsoft Store on March 31, 2017.
Justice Monsters Five Original release date: WW: August 30, 2016	Release years by system: 2016 – iOS, Android
Justice Monsters Five Original release date: WW: August 30, 2016	Notes: Mobile pinball game based on a minigame from Final Fantasy XV.; Ended its service on March 27, 2017.
A King's Tale: Final Fantasy XV Original release date: WW: November 29, 2016	Release years by system: 2016 – PlayStation 4 (PlayStation Store), Xbox One (Microsoft Store)
A King's Tale: Final Fantasy XV Original release date: WW: November 29, 2016	Notes: Arcade beat'em up spin-off set 30 years prior to Final Fantasy XV.
Final Fantasy XV: A New Empire Original release date: WW: June 29, 2017	Release years by system: 2017 – iOS, Android
Final Fantasy XV: A New Empire Original release date: WW: June 29, 2017	Notes: Based on Final Fantasy XV, features its characters and soundtrack.
King's Knight: Wrath of the Dark Dragon Original release date: WW: September 13, 2017	Release years by system: 2017 – iOS, Android
King's Knight: Wrath of the Dark Dragon Original release date: WW: September 13, 2017	Notes: Mobile remake of 1986 King's Knight and a tie-in to Final Fantasy XV.; Referenced in XV as a game enjoyed by Noctis Lucis Caelum and his friends.; Ended its service on June 26, 2018.
Monster of the Deep: Final Fantasy XV Original release date: WW: November 21, 2017	Release years by system: 2017 – PlayStation 4 (PlayStation Store)
Monster of the Deep: Final Fantasy XV Original release date: WW: November 21, 2017	Notes: Downloadable virtual reality video game for the PlayStation VR.
Final Fantasy XV: Pocket Edition Original release date: WW: February 8, 2018	Release years by system: 2018 – Android, iOS, Microsoft Windows (Microsoft Store); 2018 – Nintendo Switch (Nintendo eShop), PlayStation 4 (PlayStation Store), Xbox One (Microsoft Store) (Final Fantasy XV: Pocket Edition HD)
Final Fantasy XV: Pocket Edition Original release date: WW: February 8, 2018	Notes: Abridged version of Final Fantasy XV, remaking its storyline, graphics, and gameplay for mobile devices.
Final Fantasy XV: War for Eos Original release date: INA/MYS/PHI: March 21, 2022; WW: February 16, 2023	Release years by system: 2022 – Android; 2023 – iOS
Final Fantasy XV: War for Eos Original release date: INA/MYS/PHI: March 21, 2022; WW: February 16, 2023	Notes: Free-to-play mobile strategy game based on Final Fantasy XV.; First released on Android in Indonesia, Malaysia and the Philippines.

== Subseries ==
=== Artniks ===
Spin off games
Game	Details
Final Fantasy Artniks Original release date: JP: November 30, 2012	Release years by system: 2012 – iOS, Android
Final Fantasy Artniks Original release date: JP: November 30, 2012	Notes: Free-to-play social multiplayer role-playing game.; Players had to have a Gree mobile gaming platform account in order to play.; The game was terminated in August 2014.
Final Fantasy Artniks Dive Original release date: JP: June 30, 2014	Release years by system: 2014 – Android, iOS
Final Fantasy Artniks Dive Original release date: JP: June 30, 2014	Notes: Dungeon-crawling free-to-play multiplayer mobile game for Android and iOS.; Players had to have a Gree mobile gaming platform account in order to play.; The game was terminated in March 2016.

=== Brave Exvius ===
Spin off games
Game	Details
Final Fantasy Brave Exvius Original release date: JP: October 22, 2015; WW: June 29, 2016	Release years by system: 2015 – Android, iOS
Final Fantasy Brave Exvius Original release date: JP: October 22, 2015; WW: June 29, 2016	Notes: Free-to-play mobile role-playing game and side story to the Final Fantasy series.; Features characters from the Final Fantasy series.; Terminated
Final Fantasy Brave Exvius Tap! Original release date: WW: September 8, 2017	Release years by system: 2017 – Messenger
Final Fantasy Brave Exvius Tap! Original release date: WW: September 8, 2017	Notes: Free-to-play endless clicker game published through Facebook by Square Enix for Facebook's Messenger platform.; Spin-off of Final Fantasy Brave Exvius.; Terminated
War of the Visions: Final Fantasy Brave Exvius Original release date: JP: November 14, 2019; WW: March 25, 2020	Release years by system: 2019 – Android, iOS
War of the Visions: Final Fantasy Brave Exvius Original release date: JP: November 14, 2019; WW: March 25, 2020	Notes: Spin-off of Final Fantasy Brave Exvius.; Terminated
Final Fantasy Resonance Original release date: WW: October 22, 2026	Release years by system: 2026 – Nintendo Switch, Nintendo Switch 2, PlayStation 5, Xbox Series X/S, Microsoft Windows
Final Fantasy Resonance Original release date: WW: October 22, 2026	Notes: An adaptation of the plot and setting of the first season of the mobile game Final Fantasy Brave Exvius.

=== Chocobo ===
Spin off games
Game	Details
Chocobo series	Release years by system: 1997 – PlayStation (Chocobo no Fushigina Dungeon (Chocobo's Mysterious Dungeon)); 1998 – PlayStation (Chocobo's Dungeon 2); 1999 – WonderSwan (Chocobo no Fushigi Dungeon for WonderSwan (Chocobo's Mysterious Dungeon for WonderSwan)); 1999 – PlayStation (Chocobo Racing); 1999 – PlayStation (Chocobo Collection, includes Chocobo Racing, Chocobo Stallion and Dice de Chocobo); 2000 – WonderSwan (Hataraku Chocobo (Chocobo on the Job)); 2002 – Mobile phones (Dokodemo Chocobo (Chocobo Anywhere)); 2002 – Game Boy Advance (Chocobo Land: A Game of Dice); 2003 – Mobile phones (Dokodemo Chocobo 2: Dasshutsu! Yūreisen (Chocobo Anywhere 2: Escape! Ghost Ship)); 2003 – Mobile phones (Choco-Mate); 2004 – Mobile phones (Dokodemo Chocobo 2.5: Sennyū! Kodai Iseki (Chocobo Anywhere 2.5: Infiltrate! Ancient Ruins)); 2004 – Mobile phones (Dokodemo Chocobo 3: Taose! Niji Iro Daimaō (Chocobo Anywhere 3: Defeat! The Great Rainbow-Colored Demon)); 2006 – Mobile phones (Chocobo de Mobile); 2006 – Nintendo DS (Final Fantasy Fables: Chocobo Tales); 2007 – Wii (Final Fantasy Fables: Chocobo's Dungeon); 2008 – Nintendo DS (Cid to Chocobo no Fushigi na Dungeon: Toki Wasure no Meikyū DS+ (Cid and Chocobo's Mysterious Dungeon: The Labyrinth of Forgotten Time DS+)); 2008 – Nintendo DS (Chocobo to Mahō no Ehon: Majō to Shōjo to Gonin no Yūsha (Chocobo and the Magic Picture Book: The Witch, the Girl, and the Five Heroes)); 2010 – iOS (Chocobo Panic); 2010 – Mobile phones, Facebook (Chocobo's Crystal Tower); 2012 – iOS, Android (Chocobo No Chocotto Nouen (Chocobo's Chocotto Farm)); Cancelled – Nintendo 3DS (Chocobo Racing 3D); 2019 – Nintendo Switch, PlayStation 4 (Chocobo's Mystery Dungeon: Every Buddy!); 2022 – Nintendo Switch, iOS, Android (Chocobo GP)
Chocobo series	Notes: Series of games of different genres featuring a Chocobo, a creature from the Final Fantasy games, as the main character, with environments based on the Final Fantasy series.; Only Chocobo's Dungeon 2, Chocobo Racing, Final Fantasy Fables: Chocobo Tales, Final Fantasy Fables: Chocobo's Dungeon, Chocobo Panic, Chocobo's Crystal Tower, Chocobo's Mystery Dungeon: Every Buddy!, Chocobo GP' and Chocobo GP have been released outside Japan.

=== Crystal Chronicles ===
Spin off games
Game	Details
Final Fantasy Crystal Chronicles Original release date(s): JP: August 8, 2003; NA: February 9, 2004; EU: March 12, 2004	Release years by system: 2003 – GameCube; 2020 – Android, iOS, Nintendo Switch (Nintendo eShop), PlayStation 4 (PlayStation Store) (Final Fantasy Crystal Chronicles Remastered Edition)
Final Fantasy Crystal Chronicles Original release date(s): JP: August 8, 2003; NA: February 9, 2004; EU: March 12, 2004	Notes: Action role-playing game featuring concepts from the Final Fantasy series.; Physical version of Final Fantasy Crystal Chronicles Remastered Edition released only in Japan.
Final Fantasy Crystal Chronicles: Ring of Fates Original release date: JP: August 23, 2007; NA: March 11, 2008; EU: March 21, 2008	Release years by system: 2007 – Nintendo DS
Final Fantasy Crystal Chronicles: Ring of Fates Original release date: JP: August 23, 2007; NA: March 11, 2008; EU: March 21, 2008	Notes: Action role-playing game featuring concepts from the Final Fantasy series.
Final Fantasy Crystal Chronicles: My Life as a King Original release date: JP: March 25, 2008; NA: May 12, 2008; EU: May 20, 2008	Release years by system: 2008 – Wii (WiiWare)
Final Fantasy Crystal Chronicles: My Life as a King Original release date: JP: March 25, 2008; NA: May 12, 2008; EU: May 20, 2008	Notes: Simulation featuring concepts from the Final Fantasy series.
Final Fantasy Crystal Chronicles: Echoes of Time Original release date: JP: January 29, 2009; NA: March 24, 2009; EU: March 27, 2009	Release years by system: 2009 – Nintendo DS, Wii
Final Fantasy Crystal Chronicles: Echoes of Time Original release date: JP: January 29, 2009; NA: March 24, 2009; EU: March 27, 2009	Notes: Action role-playing game featuring concepts from the Final Fantasy series.
Final Fantasy Crystal Chronicles: My Life as a Darklord Original release date: JP: June 30, 2009; EU: July 17, 2009; NA: July 20, 2009	Release years by system: 2009 – Wii (WiiWare)
Final Fantasy Crystal Chronicles: My Life as a Darklord Original release date: JP: June 30, 2009; EU: July 17, 2009; NA: July 20, 2009	Notes: Tower Defense featuring concepts from the Final Fantasy series.
Final Fantasy Crystal Chronicles: The Crystal Bearers Original release date: JP: November 12, 2009; NA: December 26, 2009; EU: February 5, 2010	Release years by system: 2009 – Wii
Final Fantasy Crystal Chronicles: The Crystal Bearers Original release date: JP: November 12, 2009; NA: December 26, 2009; EU: February 5, 2010	Notes: Action role-playing game featuring concepts from the Final Fantasy series.

=== Crystal Defenders ===
Spin off games
Game	Details
Crystal Guardians Original release date(s): JP: January 28, 2008; WW: December 23, 2008	Release years by system: 2008 – Mobile phones 2008 – iOS, Wiiware, Xbox Live Arcade, PlayStation Network (Crystal Defenders); 2011 – Android (Crystal Defenders)
Crystal Guardians Original release date(s): JP: January 28, 2008; WW: December 23, 2008	Notes: Originally released in Japan as Crystal Guardians, later rebranded as Crystal Defenders.; Turn-based strategy game using concepts from Final Fantasy Tactics A2: Grimoire of the Rift.; Terminated in May 2016.
Crystal Defenders: Vanguard Storm Original release date: WW: May 13, 2009	Release years by system: 2009 – iOS
Crystal Defenders: Vanguard Storm Original release date: WW: May 13, 2009	Notes: Turn-based strategy game using concepts from Final Fantasy Tactics A2: Grimoire of the Rift.; Terminated on August 31, 2017.

=== Dimensions ===
Spin off games
Game	Details
Final Fantasy Dimensions Original release dates: JP: September 6, 2010; NA: August 31, 2012 (smartphone version); EU: August 31, 2012 (smartphone version)	Release years by system: 2010 – Mobile phones 2012 – iOS, Android
Final Fantasy Dimensions Original release dates: JP: September 6, 2010; NA: August 31, 2012 (smartphone version); EU: August 31, 2012 (smartphone version)	Notes: Released in Japan as Final Fantasy Legends: Hikari to Yami no Senshi (ファイナルファンタジー レジェンズ 光と闇の戦士, Fainaru Fantajī Rejenzu: Hikari to Yami no Senshi; lit. "Final Fantasy Legends: Warriors of Light and Darkness").; Side story of the Final Fantasy series.
Final Fantasy Dimensions II Original release date: JP: February 12, 2015; WW: November 1, 2017	Release years by system: 2015 – Android, iOS
Final Fantasy Dimensions II Original release date: JP: February 12, 2015; WW: November 1, 2017	Notes: Released in Japan as Final Fantasy Legends: Toki no Suishō (ファイナルファンタジー レジェンズ 時空ノ水晶, Fainaru Fantajī Rejenzu: Toki no Suishō; lit. "Final Fantasy Legends: Crystal of Space-Time").; Free-to-play mobile role-playing game and side story to the Final Fantasy series.; In 2016, after a massive update, rebranded as Final Fantasy Legends II in Japan.; In 2017, the old free-to-play version of the game was shut down and a paid one was re-launched under the name Final Fantasy Legends II: Toki no Suishō in Japan, which was released worldwide as Final Fantasy Dimensions II.

=== Dissidia ===
Spin off games
Game	Details
Dissidia Final Fantasy Original release dates: JP: December 18, 2008; NA: August 25, 2009; EU: September 4, 2009	Release years by system: 2008 – PlayStation Portable
Dissidia Final Fantasy Original release dates: JP: December 18, 2008; NA: August 25, 2009; EU: September 4, 2009	Notes: 3D fighting game featuring characters from the main series.
Dissidia 012 Final Fantasy Original release date: JP: March 3, 2011; NA: March 22, 2011; EU: March 25, 2011	Release years by system: 2011 – PlayStation Portable
Dissidia 012 Final Fantasy Original release date: JP: March 3, 2011; NA: March 22, 2011; EU: March 25, 2011	Notes: 3D fighting game featuring characters from the main series.
Dissidia Final Fantasy Original release date: JP: November 26, 2015; WW: January 30, 2018	Release years by system: 2015 – Arcade; 2018 – PlayStation 4 (Dissidia Final Fantasy NT); 2019 – PC (Steam) (Dissidia Final Fantasy NT)
Dissidia Final Fantasy Original release date: JP: November 26, 2015; WW: January 30, 2018	Notes: Originally released as Dissidia Final Fantasy in Japan for arcades.; 3D fighting game featuring characters from the main series.; Released as Dissidia Final Fantasy NT in 2018 for the PlayStation 4.
Dissidia Final Fantasy Opera Omnia Original release date: JP: February 1, 2017; WW: January 30, 2018	Release years by system: 2017 – iOS, Android
Dissidia Final Fantasy Opera Omnia Original release date: JP: February 1, 2017; WW: January 30, 2018	Notes: Mobile Turn-based RPG, featuring characters from the main series.
Dissidia Duellum Final Fantasy Original release date: WW: March 24, 2026	Release years by system: 2026 – iOS, Android

=== Explorers ===
Spin off games
Game	Details
Final Fantasy Explorers Original release date: JP: December 18, 2014; NA: January 26, 2016; EU: January 29, 2016	Release years by system: 2014 – Nintendo 3DS
Final Fantasy Explorers Original release date: JP: December 18, 2014; NA: January 26, 2016; EU: January 29, 2016	Notes: Multiplayer action role-playing game.; Features up to four-person co-op gameplay.
Final Fantasy Explorers-Force Original release date: JP: March 15, 2018	Release years by system: 2018 – iOS, Android
Final Fantasy Explorers-Force Original release date: JP: March 15, 2018	Notes: Online multiplayer game based on Final Fantasy Explorers.; Terminated on February 19, 2019.

=== SaGa ===
Spin off games
Game	Details
SaGa series	Release years by system: 1989 JP – 1990 NA – Game Boy (The Final Fantasy Legend); 1990 JP – 1991 NA – Game Boy (Final Fantasy Legend II); 1991 JP – 1993 NA – Game Boy (Final Fantasy Legend III)
SaGa series	Notes: Though these three games were marketed in North America with "Final Fantasy" in the title, they were originally created as entries in the SaGa series of games. The Final Fantasy name was dropped for later SaGa games brought to North America.; None of the three games bore any Final Fantasy branding in their original Japanese versions, where they were titled: Makai Toushi Sa・Ga (魔界塔士 Sa・Ga, lit. Warrior in the Tower of the Spirit World ~ Sa・Ga); Sa・Ga2: Hihō Densetsu (Sa・Ga2: 秘宝伝説, lit. Sa・Ga2: The Treasure Legend); Jikuu no Hasha ~ Sa・Ga3 [Kanketsu Hen] (時空の覇者 Sa・Ga3 [完結編], lit. The Ruler of Time and Space ~ Sa・Ga3 [Final Chapter]); The three games were republished by Sunsoft (again under the Final Fantasy Legend name) in 1998.; Not to be confused with the Final Fantasy Legends mobile games released in Japan.

=== Theatrhythm ===
Spin off games
Game	Details
Theatrhythm Final Fantasy Original release dates: JP: February 16, 2012; NA: July 3, 2012; EU: July 6, 2012	Release years by system: 2012 – Nintendo 3DS, iOS
Theatrhythm Final Fantasy Original release dates: JP: February 16, 2012; NA: July 3, 2012; EU: July 6, 2012	Notes: Rhythm game of the Final Fantasy series.; Only Final Fantasy game on the Nintendo 3DS not available on the Nintendo eShop.
Theatrhythm Final Fantasy: Curtain Call Original release dates: JP: April 24, 2014; NA: September 16, 2014; EU: September 19, 2014	Release years by system: 2014 – Nintendo 3DS
Theatrhythm Final Fantasy: Curtain Call Original release dates: JP: April 24, 2014; NA: September 16, 2014; EU: September 19, 2014	Notes: Rhythm game of the Final Fantasy series.
Theatrhythm Final Fantasy All-Star Carnival Original release date: JP: September 27, 2016	Release years by system: 2016 – Arcade
Theatrhythm Final Fantasy All-Star Carnival Original release date: JP: September 27, 2016	Notes: Rhythm game of the Final Fantasy series.
Theatrhythm Final Bar Line Original release date: WW: February 16, 2023	Release years by system: 2023 – Nintendo Switch, PlayStation 4
Theatrhythm Final Bar Line Original release date: WW: February 16, 2023	Notes: Rhythm game of various Square Enix franchises, including the Final Fantasy series.

=== Unlimited ===
Spin off games
Game	Details
Final Fantasy: Unlimited with U Original release date: JP: August 20, 2002	Release years by system: 2002 – Mobile phones
Final Fantasy: Unlimited with U Original release date: JP: August 20, 2002	Notes: Mobile phone game set in the Final Fantasy: Unlimited universe.; Turn-based role-playing game.
Final Fantasy: Unlimited on PC – Meikyū ~ Kuroki Yume no Kioku ~ Original release date: JP: May 16, 2003	Release years by system: 2003 – Microsoft Windows
Final Fantasy: Unlimited on PC – Meikyū ~ Kuroki Yume no Kioku ~ Original release date: JP: May 16, 2003	Notes: Personal computer game set in the Final Fantasy: Unlimited universe, published by Amada Printing.; Card battle game.

=== World ===
Spin off games
Game	Details
World of Final Fantasy Original release date: NA: October 25, 2016; JP: October 27, 2016; EU: October 28, 2016	Release years by system: 2016 – PlayStation Vita, PlayStation 4; 2017 – PC (Steam); 2018 – PlayStation 4 (PlayStation Store), Xbox One, Nintendo Switch, PC (Steam) (World of Final Fantasy Maxima)
World of Final Fantasy Original release date: NA: October 25, 2016; JP: October 27, 2016; EU: October 28, 2016	Notes: Features characters from the Final Fantasy series.; Physical version of World of Final Fantasy Maxima released only for the Xbox One and Nintendo Switch.
World of Final Fantasy: Meli-Melo Original release date(s): JP: December 12, 2017	Release years by system: 2017 – iOS, Android
World of Final Fantasy: Meli-Melo Original release date(s): JP: December 12, 2017	Notes: Online multiplayer video game based on World of Final Fantasy.; Terminated on December 13, 2018.

== Other games ==
Spin off games
Game	Details
Final Fantasy Adventure Original release dates: JP: June 8, 1991; NA: November 1, 1991; PAL: June 17, 1993	Release years by system: 1991 – Game Boy; 2019 – Nintendo Switch (as part of the Collection of Mana compilation)
Final Fantasy Adventure Original release dates: JP: June 8, 1991; NA: November 1, 1991; PAL: June 17, 1993	Notes: Released in Japan as Seiken Densetsu: Final Fantasy Gaiden (聖剣伝説 ～ファイナルファンタジー外伝～, Legend of the Holy Sword: Final Fantasy Gaiden) and in Europe as Mystic Quest.; First released as a side story for the Final Fantasy series, it has generated its own game series, called Mana.; Features some elements from the Final Fantasy series which did not reappear in later titles or in its remakes, Sword of Mana (2003) and Adventures of Mana (2016).
Final Fantasy Mystic Quest Original release dates: NA: October 5, 1992; JP: September 10, 1993; PAL: 1993	Release years by system: 1993 – Super NES
Final Fantasy Mystic Quest Original release dates: NA: October 5, 1992; JP: September 10, 1993; PAL: 1993	Notes: First Final Fantasy game developed specifically for an American audience.; Role-playing game with action-adventure elements.; Released in Japan as Final Fantasy USA: Mystic Quest and in Europe as Mystic Quest Legend.
Final Fantasy: The 4 Heroes of Light Original release dates: JP: October 29, 2009; NA: October 5, 2010; PAL: October 8, 2010	Release years by system: 2009 – Nintendo DS
Final Fantasy: The 4 Heroes of Light Original release dates: JP: October 29, 2009; NA: October 5, 2010; PAL: October 8, 2010	Notes: Released in Japan as Hikari no 4 Senshi: Final Fantasy Gaiden (光の4戦士 -ファイナルファンタジー外伝-, Hikari no 4 Senshi Fainaru Fantajī Gaiden; lit. "4 Heroes of Light: Final Fantasy Gaiden").; Side story of the Final Fantasy series.
Voice Fantasy Original release dates: JP: November 1, 2010	Release years by system: 2010 – iOS
Voice Fantasy Original release dates: JP: November 1, 2010	Notes: Voice-controlled RPG game.; Terminated, the game was delisted from the iOS App Store on May 31, 2016.
Final Fantasy Airborne Brigade Original release dates: JP: January 6, 2012; NA: December 14, 2012	Release years by system: 2012 – Android, iOS
Final Fantasy Airborne Brigade Original release dates: JP: January 6, 2012; NA: December 14, 2012	Notes: Online social game of the Final Fantasy series.; Terminated
Final Fantasy All the Bravest Original release dates: NA: January 17, 2013; JP: January 17, 2013; EU: January 17, 2013	Release years by system: 2013 – Android, iOS
Final Fantasy All the Bravest Original release dates: NA: January 17, 2013; JP: January 17, 2013; EU: January 17, 2013	Notes: Free-to-play mobile game featuring characters and settings from the Final Fantasy series.; Terminated, Android and iOS versions shut down and removed in November 2022 and July 2023, respectively.
Pictlogica Final Fantasy Original release date: JP: October 28, 2013	Release years by system: 2013 – Android, iOS; 2017 – Nintendo 3DS
Pictlogica Final Fantasy Original release date: JP: October 28, 2013	Notes: Free-to-play action puzzle game.; Terminated, delisted from all app stores in spring 2019.
Final Fantasy: World Wide Words Original release date: JP: September 16, 2014	Release years by system: 2014 – Android, iOS
Final Fantasy: World Wide Words Original release date: JP: September 16, 2014	Notes: Typing game featuring characters from the Final Fantasy series.; Terminated
Final Fantasy Record Keeper Original release dates: JP: September 24, 2014; NA: March 26, 2015; EU: March 26, 2015	Release years by system: 2014 – Android, iOS
Final Fantasy Record Keeper Original release dates: JP: September 24, 2014; NA: March 26, 2015; EU: March 26, 2015	Notes: Free-to-play mobile role-playing game featuring characters, scenarios and major battles from the Final Fantasy series.; Ended its service outside Japan on September 29, 2022.
Heavenstrike Rivals Original release date(s): WW: November 14, 2014	Release years by system: 2014 – Android, iOS, PC (Steam)
Heavenstrike Rivals Original release date(s): WW: November 14, 2014	Notes: Square Enix franchise characters, including those from the worlds of Final Fantasy, appeared as playable units.; Terminated
Final Fantasy Portal App Original release date: JP: February 4, 2015; WW: August 19, 2015	Release years by system: 2015 – Android, iOS
Final Fantasy Portal App Original release date: JP: February 4, 2015; WW: August 19, 2015	Notes: Contains the "Triple Triad" card game from Final Fantasy VIII.
Mobius Final Fantasy Original release date: JP: June 4, 2015; WW: August 3, 2016	Release years by system: 2015 – Android, iOS; 2017 – PC (Steam)
Mobius Final Fantasy Original release date: JP: June 4, 2015; WW: August 3, 2016	Notes: Free-to-play mobile role-playing game.; Terminated, the game concluded service in 2020 in Japan on March 31 and then globally on June 30.
Final Fantasy Digital Card Game Original release date: JP: July 9, 2019	Release years by system: 2019 – Android, iOS, PC
Final Fantasy Digital Card Game Original release date: JP: July 9, 2019	Notes: Online browser game launched for Yahoo! Japan Game+ service in Japan.; Free-to-play game with micro-transaction services.; Terminated on July 9, 2020.

== Bundled releases ==
Bundled releases
Game	Details
Final Fantasy I•II Original release date: JP: February 27, 1994	Release years by system: 1994 – Family Computer
Final Fantasy I•II Original release date: JP: February 27, 1994	Notes: Bundle release of Final Fantasy and Final Fantasy II.
Final Fantasy Collection Original release date: JP: March 11, 1999	Release years by system: 1999 – PlayStation
Final Fantasy Collection Original release date: JP: March 11, 1999	Notes: Japan-exclusive bundle of the PlayStation ports of Final Fantasy IV, V and VI in special edition packaging with omake extras.
Final Fantasy Anthology Original release dates: NA: October 5, 1999; PAL: February 27, 2002	Release years by system: 1999 – PlayStation
Final Fantasy Anthology Original release dates: NA: October 5, 1999; PAL: February 27, 2002	Notes: North American release includes PlayStation ports of Final Fantasy V and VI with a special edition soundtrack CD.; PAL release includes PlayStation ports of Final Fantasy IV and V.
Final Fantasy Chronicles Original release date: NA: June 29, 2001	Release years by system: 2001 – PlayStation
Final Fantasy Chronicles Original release date: NA: June 29, 2001	Notes: North America-exclusive bundle of the PlayStation ports of Final Fantasy IV and Chrono Trigger.
Final Fantasy Origins Original release dates: JP: October 31, 2002; NA: April 8, 2003; PAL: March 14, 2003	Release years by system: 2002 – PlayStation
Final Fantasy Origins Original release dates: JP: October 31, 2002; NA: April 8, 2003; PAL: March 14, 2003	Notes: Bundle of the PlayStation ports of Final Fantasy and Final Fantasy II.; Titled Final Fantasy I+II Premium Package in Japan.
Final Fantasy I & II: Dawn of Souls Original release dates: JP: July 29, 2004; NA: November 29, 2004; PAL: December 3, 2004	Release years by system: 2004 – Game Boy Advance
Final Fantasy I & II: Dawn of Souls Original release dates: JP: July 29, 2004; NA: November 29, 2004; PAL: December 3, 2004	Notes: Bundle of the Game Boy Advance ports of Final Fantasy and Final Fantasy II, with bonus quests and dungeons.
Final Fantasy X/X-2 Ultimate Box Original release date: JP: September 9, 2005	Release years by system: 2005 – PlayStation 2
Final Fantasy X/X-2 Ultimate Box Original release date: JP: September 9, 2005	Notes: Boxed set of Final Fantasy X and Final Fantasy X-2, with a bonus disc containing a short film that bridges the story of Final Fantasy X with X-2.
Final Fantasy IV: The Complete Collection Original release dates: JP: March 24, 2011; NA: April 19, 2011; EU: April 21, 2011; AU: April 28, 2011	Release years by system: 2011 – PlayStation Portable
Final Fantasy IV: The Complete Collection Original release dates: JP: March 24, 2011; NA: April 19, 2011; EU: April 21, 2011; AU: April 28, 2011	Notes: Bundle consisting of enhanced ports of Final Fantasy IV and Final Fantasy IV: The After Years, as well as a new scenario called Final Fantasy IV Interlude that links them together.
Final Fantasy XIII/XIII-2 Dual Pack Original release date: AS: September 13, 2012	Release years by system: 2012 – PlayStation 3
Final Fantasy XIII/XIII-2 Dual Pack Original release date: AS: September 13, 2012	Notes: Boxed set of Final Fantasy XIII and XIII-2 sold in Asia, with the voices in Japanese and the text in both Chinese and English.
Final Fantasy 25th Anniversary Ultimate Box Original release date: JP: December 18, 2012	Release years by system: 2012 – Various
Final Fantasy 25th Anniversary Ultimate Box Original release date: JP: December 18, 2012	Notes: Japan-exclusive boxed set of the first thirteen Final Fantasy games on PlayStation consoles.; Includes Final Fantasy through Final Fantasy IX on PlayStation (except Final Fantasy III on PlayStation Portable), Final Fantasy X through Final Fantasy XII on PlayStation 2, and Final Fantasy XIII on PlayStation 3.; Includes a code redeemable for in-game Moogle Earrings in Final Fantasy XIV.
Final Fantasy XIII Ultimate Collection Original release date: JP: November 21, 2013	Release years by system: 2013 – PlayStation 3
Final Fantasy XIII Ultimate Collection Original release date: JP: November 21, 2013	Notes: Boxed set of Final Fantasy XIII, Final Fantasy XIII-2 and Lightning Returns: Final Fantasy XIII, exclusive to Japan. Also included are a special art book, selected tracks from the games' soundtracks, and a Play Arts Kai figurine of Lightning.
Final Fantasy XIV Complete Edition Original release date: WW: June 23, 2015	Release years by system: 2015 – PlayStation 3, PlayStation 4, PC, macOS; 2021 – PlayStation 5; 2024 – Xbox Series X/S; 2026 – Nintendo Switch 2
Final Fantasy XIV Complete Edition Original release date: WW: June 23, 2015	Notes: Bundle containing Final Fantasy XIV and all expansions up to the latest one. Updated upon official service launch of a new expansion pack.

== Branded subseries ==
These are groups of games or system-specific releases of games that are branded or marketed together. Unlike bundles, they were made available as individual products.

Branded subseries
Game	Details
Compilation of Final Fantasy VII series	Release years by system: 2004 – Mobile phones (Before Crisis: Final Fantasy VII); 2006 – PlayStation 2 (Dirge of Cerberus: Final Fantasy VII); 2006 – Mobile phones (Dirge of Cerberus Lost Episode: Final Fantasy VII); 2007 – PlayStation Portable (Crisis Core: Final Fantasy VII); 2008 – PlayStation 2 (Dirge of Cerberus: Final Fantasy VII International)
Compilation of Final Fantasy VII series	Notes: Brand name for a series of games and animated features based in the world and continuity of Final Fantasy VII, though it does not include Final Fantasy VII itself.
Final Fantasy Mobile series	Release years by system: 2004 – Mobile phones (Final Fantasy); 2005 – Mobile phones (Final Fantasy II)
Final Fantasy Mobile series	Notes: Brand name for mobile phone ports of Final Fantasy and Final Fantasy II, which were released separately for two different mobile phone models.; Final Fantasy port is also called Final Fantasy i and Final Fantasy EZ, depending on the phone.
Finest Fantasy for Advance series	Release years by system: 2005 – Game Boy Advance (Final Fantasy IV Advance); 2006 – Game Boy Advance (Final Fantasy V Advance); 2006 – Game Boy Advance (Final Fantasy VI Advance)
Finest Fantasy for Advance series	Notes: Brand name for the Game Boy Advance ports of Final Fantasy IV, V and VI, with bonus quests and dungeons.; Brand name only used in Japan.
Ivalice Alliance series	Release years by system: 2007 – Nintendo DS (Final Fantasy XII: Revenant Wings); 2007 – PlayStation Portable (Final Fantasy Tactics: The War of the Lions); 2007 – PlayStation 2 (Final Fantasy XII International Zodiac Job System); 2007 – Nintendo DS (Final Fantasy Tactics A2: Grimoire of the Rift)
Ivalice Alliance series	Notes: Brand name for games set in the world of Ivalice.; Includes Final Fantasy XII: Revenant Wings, Final Fantasy Tactics: The War of the Lions, Final Fantasy XII International Zodiac Job System, and Final Fantasy Tactics A2: Grimoire of the Rift.; Does not include games set in Ivalice released prior to 2007, when the subseries was announced, which are Final Fantasy Tactics, Vagrant Story, Final Fantasy Tactics Advance, and Final Fantasy XII.
Fabula Nova Crystallis Final Fantasy series	Release years by system: 2009 – PlayStation 3, Xbox 360 (Final Fantasy XIII); 2011 – PlayStation Portable (Final Fantasy Type-0); 2011 – PlayStation 3, Xbox 360 (Final Fantasy XIII-2); 2013 – Android, iOS (Final Fantasy Agito); 2014 – PlayStation 3, Xbox 360 (Lightning Returns: Final Fantasy XIII); 2016 – PlayStation 4, Xbox One (Final Fantasy XV); 2016 – Android, iOS, PC (Final Fantasy Awakening)
Fabula Nova Crystallis Final Fantasy series	Notes: Brand name for games thematically connected to Final Fantasy XIII.; Includes Final Fantasy XIII, Final Fantasy XIII-2, Lightning Returns: Final Fantasy XIII, Final Fantasy Type-0, Final Fantasy Agito, Final Fantasy XV and Final Fantasy Awakening.
Final Fantasy Pixel Remaster series	Release years by system: 2021 – Steam, iOS, Android (Final Fantasy, II, III, IV, and V); 2022 – Steam, iOS, Android (Final Fantasy VI); 2023 – Nintendo Switch, PlayStation 4; 2024 – Xbox Series X/S
Final Fantasy Pixel Remaster series	Notes: Brand name for remakes of the first six mainline Final Fantasy titles.; Games are similar in content to their original releases, except for a remastered soundtrack.

== See also ==
- List of Final Fantasy media
- Final Fantasy Trading Card Game
- List of Kingdom Hearts media
