= Real Madrid (disambiguation) =

Real Madrid CF is a Spanish football club.

Real Madrid may also refer to:

- Real Madrid Baloncesto
- Real Madrid Femenino, the women's football section of Real Madrid
- Real Madrid Castilla, the reserve team of Real Madrid CF
- Real Madrid Baloncesto B, the reserve team of Real Madrid Baloncesto
- Real Madrid C, the second reserve team of Real Madrid CF
- Real Madrid CF (youth), the under-19 team of Real Madrid CF
- Real Madrid Voleibol, former volleyball team of Real Madrid CF
- Real Madrid Balonmano, former handball team of Real Madrid CF
- Real Madrid Rugby, the rugby union section of the club, closed in 1948
- Real Madrid City, Real Madrid's training facilities located outside Madrid in Valdebebas
- Real Madrid TV, an encrypted Digital television channel, operated by Real Madrid, for the Real Madrid football club
- Real Madrid Fantasy Manager, a football club management game developed by From The Bench. The game has been designed according to the theme of Real Madrid CF
- Real Madrid Resort Island, proposed sports and amusement park planned by Real Madrid on Marjan Island
