= Final Fantasy Origins =

2002 video game compilation

- Cover art by Yoshitaka Amano
- Developer: Square
- Publishers: JP: Square; EU: Infogrames; NA: Square Enix
- Directors: Hideshi Kyonen; Katsuyoshi Kawahara; Kazuhiko Yoshioka
- Producer: Yusuke Hirata
- Composer: Tsuyoshi Sekito
- Series: Final Fantasy
- Platform: PlayStation
- Release: JP: October 31, 2002; EU: March 14, 2003; NA: April 8, 2003
- Genre: Role-playing
- Mode: Single player

Final Fantasy Origins (Note: Known in Japan as Final Fantasy I & II Premium Package (Japanese: ファイナルファンタジーI・II プレミアムパッケージ, Hepburn: Fainaru Fantaji I・II Puremiamu Pakkeji)) is a 2002 video game compilation developed and published by Square for the PlayStation. The compilation features remakes of Final Fantasy (1987) and Final Fantasy II (1988), the first two games in the Final Fantasy series, originally released for the Nintendo Entertainment System. The compilation marks the latter game's first official release outside Japan. Enhancements include remade graphics and audio, computer-generated opening movies, quality-of-life improvements to the game mechanics, and unlockable artwork by series character designer Yoshitaka Amano.

The remakes included in Final Fantasy Origins were originally developed for the WonderSwan Color and initially sold separately in Japan, with a limited-edition package including both games. In western territories, Final Fantasy Origins received generally favorable reviews for its visual and audio enhancements to the two games and its price value, though opinions were divided on how well their designs held up against concurrent standards, and the narratives and characterizations were regarded as products of their time.

== Overview ==
A comparison between the original version of Final Fantasy (top) and the remake in Final Fantasy Origins (bottom)

Final Fantasy Origins consists of remade versions of the first two games in the Final Fantasy series: the original Final Fantasy and Final Fantasy II released for the Nintendo Entertainment System (NES). Both titles are derived from earlier WonderSwan Color remakes of the original games, which preserve their designs while featuring substantial updates. The collection's presentation enhances the games' graphics to 16-bit standards, with redrawn sprites and backgrounds as well as new computer-generated opening movies. The audio features rearrangements of the soundtracks' original compositions by series composer Nobuo Uematsu. Quality-of-life improvements common to both games include a dash function for faster movement, a temporary "Memo" save feature that allows the player to save at any time, a permanent save that can be made at inns, and adjustable difficulty settings. The remake of Final Fantasy II features an expanded inventory and easier enemy encounters compared to the original, though the higher difficulty can be unlocked after completing the game once. Extras include bestiaries that record encountered monsters and their statistics, listings of collected items, and unlockable galleries of artwork by series character designer Yoshitaka Amano.

== Development and release ==
In July 2002, Square was reported to be planning a fall release of Final Fantasy and Final Fantasy II remakes for the PlayStation in Japan. The titles would be sold separately alongside a limited-edition package including both games and three action figures. The remakes were developed with Yusuke Hirata as producer and Katsuyoshi Kawahara and Kazuhiko Yoshioka as directors, with Hideshi Kyonen serving as an additional director on the Final Fantasy remake. The cinematics were directed by Koji Wakasono and feature a score by Tsuyoshi Sekito. The cinematic for the Final Fantasy II remake features voice acting by Yukimasa Obi (as Firion), Takayuki Yamaguchi (as Leon), Kenta Miyake (as Gus), and Noriko Shitaya (as Maria). The compilation was exhibited at the 2002 Tokyo Game Show, confirming an October release in Japan and that individual releases were still planned. The compilation was released in Japan on October 31; the planned individual releases were never published.

In January 2003, Square announced that the remakes would be released in North America titled Final Fantasy Origins, with a release scheduled for April. A European release date of March 12 was announced later that month. The compilation was released in Europe by Infogrames on March 14 as a two-disc set, and in the United States by Square Enix on April 8 as a single-disc compilation.

== Reception ==
Reception

Aggregate score
| Aggregator | Score |
|---|---|
| Metacritic | 79/100 |

Review scores
| Publication | Score |
|---|---|
| Consoles + | 80% |
| Electronic Gaming Monthly | 8/10, 7/10, 7/10 |
| Game Informer | 9.25/10 |
| GamesMaster | 83% |
| GameSpot | 7/10 |
| IGN | 9/10 |
| Jeuxvideo.com | 15/20 |
| Official U.S. PlayStation Magazine | 3.5/5 |
| X-Play | 4/5 |

Final Fantasy Origins was met with "generally favorable" reviews according to the review aggregator website Metacritic, and in its first month of release in the United States, it was the eleventh best-selling home console video game. Reviewers consistently highlighted its historical significance and value as a package. Chet Barber of Game Informer noted that the release brought Final Fantasy II to American players after having previously been Japan-exclusive, and he as well as others praised the strong price value for two full-length games; Brad Shoemaker of GameSpot added that the PlayStation 2's backward compatibility makes accessing the games more convenient. Romendil of Jeuxvideo.com and a reviewer for Consoles + positioned the set as essential for fans and nostalgists, with Tom Mayo of GamesMaster and Chris Hudak of X-Play respectively likening the experience to a remastered classic film and carefully restored museum pieces that honor the foundations of the genre. Shane Bettenhausen of Electronic Gaming Monthly (EGM) labeled it "a nostalgic must-buy", and Jeremy Dunham of IGN described it as possibly the best Square remake collection to date because of the extensive reworking of both titles into fully competitive 16-bit RPGs rather than "quick package jobs". Gary Steinman of Official U.S. PlayStation Magazine described it as an opportunity for newer players to examine the series' roots, though he suggested observing the first game as a historical glimpse rather than a compelling experience. However, Justin Leeper of Game Informer argued the games would have been better suited to a Game Boy Advance compilation and that prior Square collections (such as Final Fantasy Anthology (1999) and Chronicles (2001)) already surpassed them, while Fennec Fox of GamePro concluded that only hardcore Final Fantasy fanatics would find the set worthwhile.

The presentation upgrades were approved of for elevating the original games without fully modernizing them. The graphics were frequently compared to early Super NES standards, with Hudak deeming the redrawn sprites on par with the mid-series sequels. The CG sequences were also praised for adding polish, though Hudak found the shifts between the antiquated gameplay and impressive cinematics strange. While Romendil and Steinman considered the production values short of the PlayStation's best-looking titles, such as SaGa Frontier 2 (1999), Steinman regarded the upgrade as sufficient to remove the games' "old-school ugliness" while retaining their "old-school charm". Shoemaker admired the smoother technical performance compared to earlier Square collections. The music reproductions were praised, with Dunham singling out the remixed versions of the first game's tracks as "awesome". The bestiaries, item listings, and art galleries were widely cited as an enticing incentive for dedicated fans.

The gameplay received more mixed assessments. Barber reported that the gameplay was largely intact with only slight combat tweaks and added button maps, though he was annoyed at having to use the d-pad. Dunham regarded the factors determined by the first game's adjustable difficulty level as a "nice touch", and appreciated the Memo save function and dash ability; for Final Fantasy II, he highlighted the expanded inventory and easier enemy encounters, while assuring traditionalists that the original difficulty setting is unlockable. He proclaimed the second game's skill proficiency system as "proof that Square was always looking to improve," and described the "World Memory System" of memorizing keywords for later conversations as innovative for its time. Greg Sewart of EGM and Steinman also praised the second game's performance-based experience system as strategically engaging. Both titles were described as extremely difficult, with Shoemaker observing that they demand extensive leveling through random encounters, and Sewart cautioning that they may frustrate players accustomed to modern RPGs. Sewart and Steinman respectively labeled the first game's battles as basic and labor-intensive, and Leeper criticized the second game's opaque experience system and easy deaths. Shoemaker said the overall gameplay would be vexing to newer players but will satisfy veterans of the genre.

The narratives and characterizations were viewed as products of their time, with Final Fantasy II being generally preferred for its greater sense of development. The first game's story was characterized as simple, limited in dialogue and character development, and focused on fetch quests. The second game was said to offer stronger characterization and plot focus, with Sewart noting that particular characters would come and go as the narrative dictates, and Steinman saw early signs of the dramatic storytelling that would define later titles. Romendil regarded the first game's high fantasy setting as "Tolkien-esque", and said that while the text of the European release was entirely in English, the lack of translation was only a minor issue due to the relatively modest storylines. Hudak appreciated the remakes' refined translations for improving the dramatic writing. Shoemaker considered neither game to have the narrative depth of Final Fantasy X (2001), but deemed them fine for their time.

== See also ==
- Final Fantasy I & II: Dawn of Souls, a 2004 Game Boy Advance compilation
