= Battleheart Legacy =

2014 video game

- App icon
- Developer: Mika Mobile
- Platforms: iOS, Android
- Release: May 28, 2014
- Genre: Role-playing video game
- Mode: Single-player

Battleheart Legacy is an action RPG developed by Mika Mobile, Inc. and released on May 28, 2014. It is the follow-up to the 2011 game Battleheart. In 2018, a sequel to Battleheart was released: Battleheart 2.

== Reception ==
Reception

Aggregate score
Aggregator	Score
Metacritic	88/100

Review scores
Publication	Score
Game Informer	7.75/10
Gamezebo	4.5/5
IGN	9,2/10 (Italy)
PC Gamer (UK)	8/10
Pocket Gamer	4/5
TouchArcade	5/5
Gamereactor	9/10 (Denmark)

Battleheart Legacy received "generally favorable reviews" according to the review aggregator Metacritic, with a score of 88 out of 100 based on 12 critic reviews.
