= Kazuhiko Aoki =

Kazuhiko Aoki may refer to:

- Kazuhiko Aoki (politician) (born 1961), Japanese politician
- Kazuhiko Aoki (video game designer) (born 1961), Japanese video game designer
