= Legend of Fae =

2011 puzzle video game

- Developer: Endless Fluff Games
- Publisher: Endless Fluff Games
- Engine: GameMaker
- Platform: Windows
- Release: July 28, 2011
- Genres: Action RPG, puzzle
- Mode: Single-player

Legend of Fae is an action role-playing puzzle video game developed and published by Endless Fluff Games for the Windows in 2011.

== Reception ==
In a positive review, Nathan Meunier from GamePro opined Legend of Fae "packs a surprising level of gameplay depth to round out its accessible nature and lighthearted vibe," with a "dynamic, fun" and "deep" combat system and an "endearing" story. Andrew Barker from RPGFan gave this "charming, yet deceptively deep, indie puzzle title supported by some top-notch RPG features" an overall score of 87%, opining it is "a game you should absolutely find time to play."
