= Battleheart =

2011 video game

- Developer: Mika Mobile
- Platforms: iOS, Android
- Release: iOS: WW: January 31, 2011; Android: WW: May 13, 2011
- Genre: Role-playing
- Mode: Single-player

Battleheart is a role-playing video game developed by Mika Mobile and released on January 31, 2011, for iOS, and May 13, 2011, for Android.

It was followed by Battleheart Legacy released in 2014 and the sequel Battleheart 2 released in 2018.

== Reception ==
Reception

Aggregate score
Aggregator	Score
Metacritic	81/100

Review score
Publication	Score
TouchArcade	5/5

The game received generally positive reviews. On Metacritic, the game has a rating of 81 out of 100 based on 18 critic reviews. Wired said, "The fighting stays fast-paced and engaging because you must constantly issue new orders." Eurogamer wrote, "Battleheart's ... far deeper than you might give it credit for, and horribly addictive. It truly is the Pringles of gaming."

== Related Games ==
=== Battleheart Legacy ===
A follow-up game to Battleheart, titled Battleheart Legacy was released in 2014.

=== Battleheart 2 ===
The sequel to Battleheart, Battleheart 2, was released in 2018. TouchArcade considers it "basically an expanded take on the first game with all the lovely pleasantries that come from being built for today's hardware".
