= Treasure Isle (video game) =

2010 video game

- Developer: Zynga
- Platform: Facebook Platform
- Release: April 4, 2010
- Genres: Simulation, RPG
- Mode: Single-player with multiplayer interaction

Treasure Isle is a defunct browser-based video game by Zynga for Facebook, launched in April 2010. It allowed users to dig for treasure on various islands. The game was discontinued on December 5, 2012.

== Game Play ==
The main goal of Treasure Isle is to travel to several islands to discover lost jewels and treasures. At the beginning of the game, the player first creates a customizable avatar. This avatar is much like that of FarmVille’s avatar series. The players are provided with an island, a round hut, a Treasure Chest which can be upgraded, and a specific color of a gem tree that they can harvest everyday. Players can customize their islands by purchasing items such as furniture and tropical huts, plants, and artifacts. The players can increase their level by certain number of experience points. They can also choose to expand their islands by buying from the Store.

As the mantra goes, "No man is an island", adding "Neighbors" can help the players level up through sending gifts, sharing gems, fruits, or building items and granting requests. Players can visit their neighbors to collect coins or treasures from their neighbor's Treasure Chest, to collect gems, and even to help in certain tasks. When a player is in the neighbor's island, a pop up message normally appears indicating the need of the neighbor. A player can collect gems and coins simply by clicking the gem tree and the treasure chest respectively.

In their home islands, players have access to maps, backpacks, tools, and store. Maps provide several islands and each islands have treasures that make up a collection. Finding those treasures and completing them offers rewards which are experience points, fruits, and coins.

== Energy ==
When players explore islands and dig for treasure, their energy meter will decrease. For example, players lose five energy every time they dig ground; 10 energy when mining a rock, and seven energy when cutting a plant or a tree. Players can refill their energy meter by waiting for five minutes, or by consuming fruits which can be acquired either as gifts from friends or rewards while digging. Both options result in the gain of one energy point. Players can also send fruits as gifts to their neighbors. Fruits have different energy levels: pineapple has the biggest amount, supplying 25 energy; coconut has 20; mango has 15; banana has 10; and kiwi has 5. Players can also grow their own fruit, which takes a varied amount of time (from one hour to one day). Another way to get energy is by asking friends for an energy pack which will refill the energy meter. The request for energy packs is available daily. Additionally, players may purchase energy packs from the store for 10 island cash. Players can easily level up by completely digging an island as it rewards additional points. Each increase on the level gains one additional energy in a player's total energy meter. Additionally, players can get one energy added in their energy and energy meter each time they use an Energy Capsule.

== Neighbors ==
As with most Zynga games, players can add neighbors which will provide added benefits. Some islands require a set amount of neighbors for the player to access it, although the alternative is to pay cash to unlock the island.

One benefit of adding neighbors is that players can visit neighbors daily and collect gems from their gem tree. They can also collect a treasure chest which is usually floating near the coast of their island. Treasure chests generate a random amount of money.

Another benefit is that players can send and receive gifts from their neighbors. Whether it's an energy pack, a fruit, or a free gift, the player can assist others by sending them necessary treasures.

== Home Island ==
The player also has the option to build up their own paradise on an island given to them when they started the game. This island can be customized by various items, like trees, plants, huts, or statues.

The player can gain money or cash by digging on islands, in which case the player can find coins ranging in value from 100 to 150. The player can use the money to buy an expansion to their home island, or buy furniture in order to make the island more appealing. The decorations include items like plants, huts, and animals.

One of the default items are the Gem trees. This tree grows on the island and every day, the player can pick one gem off their own tree and share the others with friends. These gems can be used to unlock Gem gates on other islands. Another default item is the treasure chest which is usually seen floating offshore and can be collected daily to gain coins. The treasure chest can be upgraded for better rewards.

== Discontinuation ==
In October 2012, it was announced that Treasure Isle game would be discontinued on December 5, 2012.
