= Mark Leung =

2011 video game

- Developer: Uglysoft
- Engine: Torque Engine
- Platform: Windows
- Release: January 2011
- Genre: Role-playing game
- Mode: Single-player

Mark Leung: Revenge of the Bitch is a parody role-playing game developed by Uglysoft. The game released in January 2011 and is the first installment in an episodic series.

Mark Leung was written, produced and directed by creator Mark Leung. As a spiritual successor to the film, cutscenes in the game are presented with live action video clips with actors cosplaying the characters. The game frequently makes references to the popular culture such as the Double Rainbow, flaming trolls and the Kanye West interruption at the VMAs. Many characters and monsters are bizarre hybrids of public figures and well-known characters, such as Jhompson, a summonable character inspired by Jack Thompson and Illidan Stormrage of World of Warcraft, and McFunny, a boss character inspired by Joker and Ronald McDonald. Recent events such as the subprime mortgage crisis also inspired a bank-themed dungeon and a cleric named Brother Lehman.

== Gameplay ==
As with traditional plot-driven JRPGs, the player is guided by main objectives, but is free to explore Untitled (the game's world) to do side quests or fight special monsters, such as Giants, for additional rewards. Over the course of the game, players gain navigation aids such as the Return spell and Crocobo Riding.

Monsters appearing in the field represent groups of monsters. If the player makes a preemptive attack against the monster, the player will be able to deal damage and enter a battle with turn priority. If the monster comes into contact with the player before an attack is made, the monsters will have turn priority in the battle.

Battle encounters are made under a turn-based system, where turns are distributed to the player and enemies' parties. Emerging victorious from a battle yields experience points, skill points and money (the game uses 'dollar' as its currency).

As different character setups vary in effectiveness in different battle encounters, players are encouraged to experiment with different character builds and setups. Aside from a general leveling system, a character may learn skills by accumulating skill points and further improve them by using them frequently.

=== Classes ===
Each character has a constant Main Class and a switchable Support Class, and has access to Action Abilities of both active Classes and Passive Abilities of all Classes at the same time.

Fighting - A melee class covering basic combat skills that deal single-target damage and perform various crowd control abilities.

Healing - Focuses on HP recovery, status recovery and damage prevention spells for single targets.

Sorcery - Focuses on dealing elemental spell damage on single targets. Advanced spells may also trigger additional effects.

Combat Skating - An Icelandic martial art that focuses on kicking techniques with ice skates. The nature of the weapon allows for physical damage on multiple, often random targets.

Dreamcalling - A class available only to Ines, who is gifted with the ability to call forth Dreamolons from the Dreamscape to fight for her, dealing spell damage on multiple targets.

== Plot ==
=== Setting ===
The game world is set in a pseudo-Medieval fantasy world named Untitled. It is a retention of the real world map with country names and borders randomly rearranged. For example, the player starts off at the Kingdom of Hong Kong, which is where Australia is in the real world map, whereas Australia of Untitled is located mainly in the Middle East. Each country's climate and culture also bear no resemblance to their real life counterparts. Iceland, for example, is covered in snow. This arrangement is meant to be a mockery of general ignorance in geography.

=== Story ===
The population of Untitled has long been dominated by the Church of Noobism. Until recently, the world saw the rise of a rival religion, the Church of Vegetology, which gained much influence under an aggressive marketing campaign. Vegetology also used unethical measures to compel the population into joining their religion. Two commoners from the Kingdom of Hong Kong, Mark and Dick, unwittingly uncover their secret plot and trigger a preemptive invasion campaign against Canada, a country suspected to be the origin of Vegetology.

Mark and Dick were sent on a mission to Ireland to retrieve Hong Kong's lost pirate navy. Upon arrival however, they are forced by Hong Kong's escaped princess to abort the mission and seek help from the United Nation in an effort to stop the impending war.

== Development ==
Leung first approached Hong Kong Polytechnic University's School of Design seeking incubation services to form a game development team. As a result, the Uglysoft team was formed. Several months were spent on preproduction and experimenting with game engines before the team settled with Torque Game Engine Advanced. Mark Leung was originally planned as a full game, but a decision was made to split it into an episodic series, each carrying its own theme and sub-plot.

== Audio ==
The in-game music of Mark Leung is scored by Leonard To and Matthew Myers. Background music for live action cut scenes mainly use stock music.

Sound effects are arranged by various members of the staff. Mark Leung himself voiced many creatures that do not resemble common animals, such as the Bitchkraken and Goldman Sex. He also arranged the ambience and voiced some of the creatures where necessary.

== Reception ==
Mark Leung received generally positive reviews.

Mark Leung

Aggregate score
Aggregator	Score
Metacritic	79%

Review scores
Publication	Score
RPGFan	75%
Gamer.nl	7/10
