= Final Fantasy Chronicles =

Video game compilation released in 2001

- Developers: Square; Tose
- Publishers: Square Electronic Arts; Square Enix (Greatest Hits re-release)
- Series: Final Fantasy; Chrono
- Platform: PlayStation
- Release: NA: July 2, 2001
- Genre: Role-playing
- Modes: Single-player, multiplayer

Final Fantasy Chronicles is a compilation of Square's role-playing video games Final Fantasy IV (1991) and Chrono Trigger (1995), released for the North American Sony PlayStation on July 2, 2001. TOSE ported both titles from the Super Nintendo Entertainment System; each had been previously released as individual Japanese PlayStation ports in 1997 (Final Fantasy IV) and 1999 (Chrono Trigger). Several bonus features were added to each game, such as art galleries, bestiaries, and cutscenes—including computer-generated imagery full motion video used at the beginning of Final Fantasy IV and anime scenes used throughout Chrono Trigger.

Final Fantasy Chronicles was received well by players and critics, who praised the peripheral features and the fact that Square was offering RPG classics to a new generation of gamers. Conversely, reviewers sharply criticized "long and frequent loading" between areas and battles due to poor emulation. Enough copies of Chronicles were sold to warrant a second release as part of Sony's Greatest Hits in June 2003.

== Gameplay ==
In Final Fantasy IV and Chrono Trigger, the player controls a set of characters, closely following the role-playing video game genre. The methods of viewing and controlling the characters are separated by three different "screens": the overworld, where the characters traverse to different locations; the field map, where the characters explore locations such as towns and dungeons; and the battle screen, where the characters fight with monsters or other enemies.

=== Final Fantasy IV ===
Final Fantasy IV introduced the Active Time Battle, a system designed by Hiroyuki Ito. It centers around the player inputting orders for the characters in "real time" during battles. Each character is balanced through certain strengths and weaknesses; for instance, a strong magic user may have low defense, while a physical fighter may have low agility.

=== Chrono Trigger ===
Chrono Trigger's gameplay deviates from traditional role-playing games in that, rather than random encounters, most enemies are openly visible on field maps or lie in wait to ambush the party. Contact with enemies on a field map initiates a battle that occurs directly on the field map itself rather than on a separate battle screen. Chrono Trigger uses an updated form of the Active Time Battle introduced in Final Fantasy IV, with additions such as "Techs" that rely on enemy positioning and abilities of characters. Other features are the employment of time travel and a "New Game Plus" option.

== Development ==
Final Fantasy Chronicles features two previously released ports by TOSE; Final Fantasy IV and Chrono Trigger were released separately, and IV was re-released as a part of Final Fantasy Collection, all published in Japan. Chronicles was designed and directed by Kazuhiko Aoki, supervised by Fumiaki Fukaya, and produced by Akihiro Imai. It was created as a follow-up to Final Fantasy Anthology, a compilation of Final Fantasy V and VI.

The original Final Fantasy IV was released in North America as Final Fantasy II in 1991, with various "Easytype" modifications. These were removed in the Final Fantasy Chronicles version, and the game was re-localized, achieving a script closer Takashi Tokita's original scenario. Chrono Trigger, released in 1995, was already localized by Ted Woolsey, but the Final Fantasy Chronicles version has additional modifications.

A primary addition to both games is full-motion video. Final Fantasy IV features computer animated cutscene sequences by Visual Works, while Chrono Trigger features anime-style sequences designed by Akira Toriyama and animated by Toei Animation that "help further tell the story of Chrono Trigger". Final Fantasy IV was given gameplay features such as a two-player mode, a "Sprint Feature" to "enhance and quicken gameplay", and the "Memo File" system to "reduce saving time". Chrono Trigger, instead of added gameplay features, has an "Extras Mode". This features databases such as a bestiary and a gallery of artwork created in development.

=== Promotion and merchandising ===
A compilation of Final Fantasy IV and Chrono Trigger was in consideration in December 2000, with Final Fantasy Anthology's success a key decision factor. Final Fantasy Chronicles was announced by Square Electronic Arts in April 2001. President Jun Iwasaki mentioned an "overwhelming number" of requests to re-release Chrono Trigger, and believed the compilation of it and Final Fantasy IV would "appeal to fans of the original games and introduce a new generation of gamers to some of our classic titles". An event was held on July 10 in San Francisco, primarily to celebrate the film Final Fantasy: The Spirits Within and release of Final Fantasy Chronicles. It featured a cosplay contest, a memorabilia raffle, and booths to play Final Fantasy Chronicles and Final Fantasy X.

Music from Final Fantasy Chronicles is a set of two separately released compact discs published by TokyoPop. Final Fantasy IV Official Soundtrack and Chrono Trigger Original Soundtrack were both released on August 21, 2001. Final Fantasy IV Official Soundtrack is nearly the same release as Final Fantasy IV: Original Sound Version, the soundtrack album for the original game, except that the songs were rerecorded by TOSE, resulting in minor differences, some song titles were slightly changed, and a 45th track was added, "Theme of Love (Arranged)", which had previously only been released as a piano version on the second track of Piano Collections Final Fantasy IV. This release has the catalog number TPCD 0210–2, and its 45 tracks had a length of 62 minutes. Chrono Trigger Original Soundtrack was the corresponding album for Chrono Trigger. The album was heavily based on Chrono Trigger Original Soundtrack, the soundtrack album for the PlayStation release of Chrono Trigger; the first 21 tracks of the album out of 25 were identical to Chrono Trigger Original Soundtrack, while the next three tracks corresponded to tracks 22, 23, and 29 of the Original Soundtrack and the final track was the same as the first track of Brink of Time, an arranged album of Chrono Trigger music. The album is 1:13:03 long, and has a catalog number of TPCD 0209–2. In addition to the albums, a strategy guide for Final Fantasy Chronicles written by Dan Birlew and was published by BradyGames on July 2, 2001.

== Reception ==
Reception

Aggregate scores
Aggregator	Score
GameRankings	87%
Metacritic	89/100

Review scores
Publication	Score
Electronic Gaming Monthly	8.33/10
GamePro	5/5
GameSpot	8.5/10
IGN	9.4/10
Official U.S. PlayStation Magazine	4/5

Awards
Publication	Award
IGN	Editors' Choice
GamePro	Editors' Choice
Electronic Gaming Monthly	Silver Award

Final Fantasy Chronicles was commercially and critically successful, becoming the top selling PlayStation title for two weeks, and scoring an average of 89 out of 100 in Metacritic's aggregate, a review tallying website. Gaming website IGN rated it 9.4/10 and awarded an "Editor's Choice Award", calling the game a "must buy" for RPG fans. It was a runner-up for GameSpot's annual "Best PlayStation Game" award, which went to Tony Hawk's Pro Skater 3.

GameSpot reviewer Brad Shoemaker gave the game an 8.5, but cited "muffled sound effects" in Final Fantasy IV, and was displeased with frequent loading in Chrono Trigger. He added that the visuals were "stupendous" when the games were originally released, but they now look dated and will "turn off those looking for a bigger thrill for their gaming dollar". Marcus Lai of Gaming Age was disappointed with a lack of additions, calling the ports "barebone games" and claiming that the full motion videos are "nice touches to both games but don't add much".

== See also ==
- List of Square Enix video game franchises
