= Voice Fantasy =

2010 video game

- Developers: Square Enix; Koto Laboratories
- Platform: iOS
- Release: November 1, 2010
- Genre: Action game
- Mode: Single-player

Voice Fantasy was a 2010 action game developed and published by Square Enix and released for the Apple iOS platforms. The game centered on battles between the player's army and enemy monsters or computer-controlled players. The characters in the army were generated using the sounds of the player's own voice, and then engaged in side-scrolling combat with the enemy. The game was created in concert with Koto Laboratories, and was announced on Facebook one week prior to release. It was critically panned by reviewers, who praised for its novel concept but dismissed the title as a short-lived gimmick with very little gameplay or replayability. The game was delisted from the iOS App Store in May 2016.

== Gameplay ==
A battle against the demon king, with two characters currently attacking, named "Square" and "Enix".

Voice Fantasy consisted of fighting an enemy by sending an army of customized characters to fight against them. The game contained three modes of play; "Single Match", where the players could battle other players, "Tag Match" where they could battle in groups of two, and the primary "Demon King" mode, where monsters were battled instead. Once battle commenced, all battle actions and commands were automated. The game was single-player only; matches against other "players" were held against computer-controlled heroes.

The players could start the game by creating characters to fight for them, by speaking any word into the microphone to build the character on. Based on the pitch of the player's voice, rather than the word said, a character was created with different levels of eight different combat attributes such as abilities, personality, and jobs such as a warrior or a mage. As the characters players had created attacked, they repeated the sound or words the player used to create them, sometimes using a different pitch level. The game held up to 50 characters, and characters could be saved or deleted after each round of combat. Battles took place in a side-on view. Other than creating the initial characters, the players had no control over their actions or the rest of the game.

== Development ==
Developer studios Koto Laboratories contributed to the software development and sound implementation. Square Enix registered a trademark for Voice Fantasy in February 2010. Some excitement and discussion preceded the release of the game, when a week before its release, Square Enix posted on their Facebook page that they were releasing a game allowing players to create characters with their voices, and some speculated it was related to a previously released game called Song Summoners. The game was released on iOS on November 1 the same year. Voice Fantasy was updated in February 2011 so that players could play as any of the three main characters from the highly acclaimed video game Secret of Mana.

== Reception ==
Reception

Aggregate score
Aggregator	Score
Metacritic	46/100

Review scores
Publication	Score
IGN	5/10
Pocket Gamer	4/10
148Apps	3/5
Slide to Play	2.5/10

Two major concerns of reviewers were the lack of ability by the player to participate in combat, and prevent any mistakes by the in game AI, and the inability of the characters to gain a higher level through experience points like other role playing games, making any weak skilled characters not worth playing with at all. IGN referred to the game as a tech demo, citing its lack of extensive gameplay or story, and rated the game 5/10, or "Mediocre". Reviewers cited that other than brief laughter with friends at the strange or obscene things they got their characters to say, the length of gameplay could be measured in minutes. TouchArcade classified it as on the border between a game and an entertainment app because of its brevity and its lack of interactivity, but recommended it for playing in the presence of friends to show the iPhones unique gaming capabilities. Pocket Gamer, on the other hand, said that it "can be described as more a microphone tech demo than serious game", and felt that there was so little gameplay involved in the app that "it's questionable it even deserves to be called a game".

The game was praised for its novelty by The Escapist, who approved of Square Enix's attempt to create a game specifically using the strengths of the game system it was making games for, and also trying something new instead of more efforts at porting older games. The graphics were also praised for their retro and colorful graphics style, and was named "App of the Day" by The Unofficial Apple Blog. It has also been noted that the spells, monsters, names and music of the game do not come from any established Final Fantasy game, making the "Fantasy" title feel "tacked on". Both the TouchArcade and 148Apps reviews stated that the game was better as an app to show the player's friends the interesting concept than as a game to play.
