= Real Madrid Fantasy Manager =

2010 video game

- Developer: From The Bench
- Publisher: Real Madrid CF
- Platforms: Facebook, iPhone, Android
- Release: Facebook; 20 September 2010 iPhone; 17 September 2010 Android; 25 November 2011
- Genres: Role-Playing, Business Simulation
- Mode: Single-player with multiplayer interaction

Real Madrid Fantasy Manager is a football club management game developed by From The Bench. The game is available on Facebook, iPhone and Android platforms.

The game has been designed according to the theme of Real Madrid CF. There are 2011, 2012, 2013, and 2014 editions.

== Gameplay ==
=== Start of the game ===
At the start of the game, the players has three options — to create a squad, to play with the whole squad of Real Madrid, or to play with the team, which the system prepares.

If the player wants to make a squad, they have €90 million as their budget, and can choose from various teams and available players. The assembled squad must contain at least two goalkeepers, five defenders, five midfielders and three strikers. To play with the whole squad of Real Madrid, more shields have to be brought. If the player chooses to go for the team which the system chooses, they get a random team with one Real Madrid Player, 15 shields & €7 million as a budget.

=== Game currency ===
Shields are the main virtual currency of the game, which can be used to increase budget, shop items, signing players, etc. in the game. Shields can be obtained in the shop, where players can buy more shields using Facebook credits.

The other major currency is the money or total budget available with the team, which used to be counted in Euros.

=== Facilities ===
Facilities are the main source of income for a team. A player can unlock more facilities by leveling up or by gaining more partners. There are many facilities players can build like offices, shops, bars, and hotels. As a player progresses and levels up, upgrades to the current facilities unlock, which have higher yield and are better than the older one.

In the middle of all the facilities is the Estadio Santiago Bernabéu, which is the highest yielding facility, and the only facility that a player does not have to buy. Also, money is never used for the maintenance of the stadium.

=== Matches ===
A player can play matches with teams of other users, and wins for having the stronger and fitter team. After winning, the player gains experience and some money from the budget of the opponent. For winning a match, a team must have a good score, which is decided by the performance criteria of the real-life player. For getting better scores, signing new players is important. New players can be signed via both shields or the money.

The players from all teams of La Liga, Primeira Liga, Premier League, Serie A, Süper Lig & Bundesliga are available to sign.

As the season progresses, matches against users or the managers of others fantasy managers are introduced. Also, at a point of time the daily sprints are also introduced.

On 1 December 2011, just a few days before El Clásico, matches against the users of FC Barcelona Fantasy Manager, representing FC Barcelona were introduced. Also, different prizes by winning matches and different limited-edition equipment were announced.

==== Performance criteria of players ====
Every time a real life player is involved in a Premier League or European match, their skills will be updated in the game according to their performance and statistics from that match.

Play the match:
Play the match	+20
Play as first team player	+20
Win the match	+60
Draw the match	+20

For goals scored:
Forward	+30
Midfielder	+50
Defender	+80
Goalkeeper	+200
Own Goal (Any Position)	-80

For 0 goals conceded:
Goalkeeper	+80
Defender	+40
Midfielder	+20
Forward	+10

+ 3 goals conceded:
Goalkeeper	-40
Defender	-20
Midfielder	-10
Forward	-5

For player sent off:
Player sent off	-40

A player who does not play in a match will have a score of 0, irrespective of the final result.

=== Partners ===
Partners, or Socios are the users that are connected and play the game. On Facebook, a player can invite friends to the game, and they unlock as partners when they reach level 5. On iPhone, a player can invite partners by giving them a code. Partners help players to get more profit from facilities, and also help to win matches.

A partner can also be obtained in the shop, which consumes 5 shields per 1 Socio. Sometimes even a partner is gained when the app is visited daily and while getting its daily reward.

There are 130,000 monthly active users of the game, making it the most popular game in the fantasy manager series.

=== Jobs ===
Other than playing matches, there are many other jobs that are useful to gain money and experience. Purchasing better facilities will allow better jobs. Jobs are categorised in various categories like the jobs through which whether only money is gained, only experience is gained or those which give money and experience.

As facilities are upgraded, more better jobs are unlocked, that give more benefits while consuming much less energy.

=== Bank ===
The bank is the place where players can safeguard their money. It is important to deposit money in the bank in order to reduce losses if a player loses a challenge from another user. A 10% commission charge is cut from the money while being deposited. No charge is applied while withdrawing the savings from the bank.

== See also ==
- Real Madrid CF
- Fantasy Football
