= Asellus (disambiguation) =

Asellus may refer to:

- Asellus (genus), a genus of crustaceans
- Gamma Cancri, a star also known as "Asellus Borealis"
- Delta Cancri, a star also known as "Asellus Australis"
- Asellus (SaGa Frontier), one of multiple protagonists from SaGa Frontier
- Several men of Ancient Rome with this name:
  - Tiberius Claudius Asellus (praetor 206 BCE)
  - Tiberius Claudius Asellus (tribune of the plebs 139 BCE)
  - Publius Annius Asellus
