= Imperial SaGa =

2015 video game

Imperial SaGa Imperial SaGa Eclipse
- Logo for Imperial SaGa
- Developers: Think & Feel
- Publisher: Square Enix
- Directors: Tomotaka Shiroichi; Kazuma Oshu (Note: Imperial SaGa Eclipse only)
- Producers: Kei Hirono; Hirohiro Hiroko; Hiroaki Kotake
- Artists: Kurahana Chinatsu; Tomomi Kobayashi; Yusuke Naora; Satoshi Kuramochi
- Writers: Moku Tochibori; Benny Matsuyama
- Composer: Kenji Ito
- Series: SaGa
- Platform: Web browser
- Release: Original: JP: June 18, 2015; Eclipse: JP: October 31, 2019
- Genre: Role-playing
- Mode: Single-player

Imperial SaGa (Note: Inperiaru Saga (Japanese: インペリアル サガ)) was a 2015 role-playing browser game developed by Think & Feel for web browsers. A spin-off within the SaGa series, the game was published by Square Enix. A direct sequel, Imperial SaGa Eclipse, (Note: Inperiaru Saga Ekuripusu (Japanese: インペリアル サガ エクリプス)) was released in 2019 as a replacement for the original game for both browsers and mobile platforms. Set in original worlds and forming a continuous narrative, the story of Imperial SaGa and Eclipse followed different characters as they fought against forces threatening to destroy their world, gaining aid from the characters of earlier SaGa games. Gameplay for both titles revolved around exploring a world map and successfully completing battles, strengthening characters which could be acquired through a gacha system. The turn-based mechanics and usage-based growth system of earlier SaGa games was also carried over.

Designed as part of the series' 25th anniversary celebrations, Imperial SaGa was developed with the supervision of series creator Akitoshi Kawazu. The game was developed as a browser-based equivalent to Emperors SaGa (2012). The original scenario was created by Emperors Saga writer Moku Tochibori, while additional work and later scenarios by Benny Matsuyama. Kurahana Chinatsu and Tomomi Kobayashi handled character designs. Eclipse was developed as a direct follow-up, continuing the story and carrying over its gameplay with some altered elements. Matsuyama returned as lead writer, while the characters were designed by veteran artists Yusuke Naora and Satoshi Kuramochi. Regular series composer Kenji Ito created original music for both titles.

The original Imperial SaGa operated until 2019 when it closed down due to the discontinuation of Adobe Flash, and saw positive feedback from players. The limited commentary from journalists focusing on its nostalgic elements and high initial difficulty. Eclipse, which operated until 2024, was praised by Japanese journalists for its narrative and reworked gameplay.

== Premise and gameplay ==
A battle in Imperial SaGa; while adjusted for browsers, the basic gameplay is carried over from the mainline SaGa series.

Imperial SaGa and its sequel Imperial SaGa Eclipse were a duology role-playing browser games in which players took the role of leader for a group of warriors; their goal was to defeat enemies, expanding their territory and defending their people while completing episodic scenarios. The story of Imperial SaGa followed the actions of the Emperor and his followers in a fight against demonic forces threatening their home of Dysnomia, a composite realm created by the gods to shelter humanity that has drawn in people from other SaGa worlds. Eclipse focuses on protagonist Liber, an agent of the sun god Barral, saves Dysnomia's people from the realm's destruction in a climactic battle, ultimately facing a new threat to their current home of Dimirheim. Navigation took place on a world map, with battles or story events triggering when the player reached nodes on the map.

In Imperial SaGa, the aim was to defeat enemies and boss opponents on the world map to advance the story and raise a character's experience level; players could fight manually, or enable Auto-battle. Combat used a turn-based combat system, with each side using group configurations called Formations to attack, which could unlock differing attack strategies or activate passive abilities. In addition, using a special item during a boss battle with all five party members active would trigger a special attack where the entire recruited army performed a single attack, resulting in high damage. The game incorporated a gacha system, where players could roll for different characters, and pay via microtransactions for additional gacha currency.

Rather than a traditional leveling system, Imperial SaGa featured the usage-based system of earlier SaGa games; actions performed in battle randomly raised a character's statistics, using a skill regularly enough raised the strength of that skill, and new skills were unlocked upon using a similar skill enough times. Each unit had health (HP) and Life Points (LP). LP decreased each time a character was defeated, with LP needing to recharge outside battle. If a character lost all LP, they were unable to take part in combat until their LP was replenished. The Emperor was the only character with unlimited LP.

For Imperial SaGa Eclipse, most of the gameplay was carried over from Imperial SaGa including the presentation, basic combat system, and gacha mechanics for characters and equipment. The scenario was split between the main one, and "Chronicles", an alternate story retelling the narrative of Imperial SaGa using the new lead character. A new combat mechanic was a Timeline displaying turn order, allowing for further move planning and manipulation of events in battle. Additional modes such as new difficulty options and replaying powerful boss battles were added after launch.

== Development ==
=== Imperial SaGa ===
Imperial SaGa was developed by Japanese studio Think & Feel, who had previously worked with Square Enix on the Nintendo DS titles Final Fantasy XII: Revenant Wings and Blood of Bahamut. Imperial SaGa was the first SaGa game developed for PC browser platforms. Development began in 2012 after Square Enix producer Kei Hirono saw the strong positive reception of the mobile game Emperors SaGa; his aim was to create an equivalent experience for browsers and begin a series of similar expansions for the SaGa franchise. Hirono acted as the game's producer, and directed by Tomotaka Shiroichi. Series creator Akitoshi Kawazu acted as executive producer and general supervisor for the project. Work on Imperial SaGa ran parallel to both the continued support for Emperors SaGa and the upcoming SaGa: Scarlet Grace. While Emperors SaGa had been a card-based battle game, Imperial SaGa was designed with gameplay similar to the rest of the SaGa series.

The original scenario was written by Moku Tochibori, who had previously worked on Emperors SaGa, in addition to game titles including Metal Gear Acid and Final Fantasy Type-0. Tochibori was helped in writing the scenario by Benny Matsuyama, who had created supplementary material related to Square Enix's games for publisher Studio BentStuff. Matsuyama continued to contribute to later scenarios. Commenting on his work, Matsuyama said that the characters' set personalities made the scenarios easy to write. The scenario was generally supervised by Kawazu. The succession of rulers which played a part in the narrative was directly inspired by Romancing SaGa 2. During his work on the game, Tochibori's writing ended up influencing a quest for Emperors SaGa based on Romancing SaGa 2 after his scenario impressed Kawazu. The dark tone was intended to reflect both Romancing SaGa and SaGa Frontier.

The promotional and original character artwork was created by series artist Tomomi Kobayashi, who was brought in to appeal to long-time fans of the SaGa series. Other new characters and redesigns of earlier protagonists being handled by Kurahana Chinatsu, noted for her work on Uta no Prince-sama. Chinatsu was brought on board the project to bring in players new to the series. Despite the contrasting styles of Kobayashi and Chinatsu, Hirono did not want to force Chinatsu to mimic the older art style, and Kawazu was pleased that her designs remained original while fitting into the SaGa series. The character sprites were created using a modern form of the "dot graphic" pixel art used in early SaGa titles.

Imperial SaGa was first announced during a special livestream alongside SaGa: Scarlet Grace; the two games were announced as part of the series' 25th anniversary celebrations. Pre-registration for the game opened in May 2015, offering rewards of characters themed after Romancing SaGa 2. The game released on multiple browser platforms on June 18, 2015, with later versions launching for new browser servers in 2016. Following its initial release, the developers focused on addressing player feedback regarding the game's balance and difficulty, and added additional story routes to the campaign. Later updates also added new difficulty settings and gameplay adjustments, and an official guidebook was released on December 17, 2017. Square announced that it would end support for Imperial Saga on December 26, 2019 due to waning support for Adobe Flash. It was explained by the team that supporting game would become difficult beyond 2020.

=== Imperial SaGa: Eclipse ===
Alongside the shutdown of Eclipse. Square Enix confirmed that a replacement game project was in development using HTML5. The sequel, eventually titled Imperial SaGa Eclipse, was developed for both PC and mobile; Think & Feel returned as developer. The staff included Kawazu as executive producer, producer Kazuma Oshu, director Hiroaki Kotake, and Matsuyama as lead writer. The art team included Masahiko Dairaku, and character designers Yusuke Naora and Satoshi Kuramochi. Work on Eclipse began while Imperial SaGa was still in production as the team had heard of Adobe Flash's discontinuation, but wanted to continue the Imperial SaGa brand due to its popularity. While restructuring Imperial SaGa to work with the HTML5 architecture, this was abandoned due to technical difficulties with porting between platforms.

Due to the two games being worked on in parallel, the transition between games could be planned in advance, with Matsuyama enjoying having enough time to write his scenarios compared to how rushed he was with Imperial SaGa. The Chronicles mode also allowed Matsuyama to tie the events of the previous game into Eclipse in a natural way. He described the core theme of Eclipse as questioning how characters would react when knowing their eventual fate, something informed by Eclipse being a successor to Imperial SaGa. Naora, who had worked on Unlimited SaGa and Romancing SaGa: Minstrel Song was pleased to be returning to the series. He designed main protagonist Liber, wanting them to be an approachable character for new players. His art was done in a watercolor style, emulating Kobayashi's earlier work on the series. Kuramochi, who had worked on Scarlet Grace, designed some characters and bosses alongside key art.

Eclipse was announced in June 2019, and released on October 31 of that year for Yahoo and Exonia browser platforms. It was subsequently released for Niconico's mobile platform on November 26, 2020, and for Docomo's dGame service on July 29, 2021. The Niconico and dGame versions closed down in 2023 with the end of their respective platforms, with data being transferrable to the remaining version. In May 2024, Square Enix announced that Eclipse would shut down on December 26 of that year. The reason given was increasing difficulty providing a satisfactory experience for players. Over the next few months following the announcement, the gacha mechanics were wound down, and the story was preserved on the game's website for players to access after shutdown.

=== Music ===
The music was composed by Kenji Ito, who first co-composed the music for Final Fantasy Legend II and was sole composer for the Romancing SaGa games and SaGa Frontier. Ito worked on the project in parallel to creating the soundtrack for Scarlet Grace. When Hirono first contacted Ito, his request was for an original soundtrack which would also honor the series' musical legacy. The original tracks were recorded using a live orchestra. Arrangements were created for the various original and earlier tracks for different story routes, handled primarily by Noriyuki Kamikura and Noritoshi Narita. The lyrics for vocal tracks were written by Kawazu. A soundtrack album was released physically and digitally on September 16, 2015.

Ito returned as composer for Eclipse. For Eclipse, Ito was able to experiment with creating tracks with piano as the main instrument. Ito composed over twenty additional tracks for the game, commenting that he "immersed himself" in the game's worldview, which was different from his work on the mobile title Romancing SaGa Re;univerSe. The soundtrack was recorded in a studio in Hokkaido, and featured both original tracks and arrangements of earlier SaGa titles. A digitial soundtrack album was released on April 28, 2020.

== Reception ==
Commenting on USGamer about an early trailer, Jeremy Parish noted that game's platform, combined with the series' then-niche status outside Japan, would prevent Imperial SaGa from releasing in English. He compared its focus on nostalgia to Final Fantasy Record Keeper, noting it as part of a trend with Square Enix's long-standing series. In a review covering an early access version, Dengeki Online noted several mechanical callbacks to earlier SaGa titles, and praised the presentation and faithfulness to SaGa gameplay including high initial difficulty. Following its initial release, general feedback was positive, although many players criticised the high difficulty which developers decided to correct in future updates.

Reviewing Eclipse in 2019, Japanese website AppGet noted praised the art design and combat, but noted the high difficulty of many battles and described the gacha as "a chaotic mix of characters and equipment". Dengeki Online praised both the new storyline and the reworked gameplay mechanics, and found the gacha system easy to understand and generous for players trying to get high-ranking characters. The writer ultimately summed up the initial experience as "solid" when compared to the early days of Imperial SaGa.
