= Asellus (SaGa Frontier) =

Protagonist in SaGa Frontier

- SaGa character
- Asellus in SaGa Frontier
- First appearance: SaGa Frontier (1997)
- Created by: Miwa Shoda
- Designed by: Tomomi Kobayashi

In-universe information
- Species: Half-human half-Mystic

Asellus (Japanese: アセルス, Hepburn: Aserusu) is a character in the 1997 video game SaGa Frontier, and one of its seven main characters. She is a human who became half-Mystic, a vampire-like race, after nearly dying after being struck by a carriage and saved by being given blood from a Mystic named Orlouge. Her design was created by character artist Tomomi Kobayashi, and her scenario was written by Miwa Shoda. Shoda was inspired to write a maiden game in a world of demons by multiple sources, including Takarazuka Revue, Otome games, and Shōjo manga, with Asellus' Mystic origins inspired by a dream with the same premise as Asellus'. Asellus speaks masculine when talking to women and feminine when talking to men.

She was intended to be a character who was able to thrive without men and whom women would fall for, though some of these aspects were not able to get past the planning stages, so Shoda instead made it a coming-of-age story. Asellus associates with two women in particular, namely Gina, a tailor, and White Rose, a princess, both having romantic tension with her. Asellus has been generally well received, particularly praised as an early example of an LGBTQ+ character in video games. Her relationship with other characters, such as White Rose and Orlouge, has also been discussed, and she has been recognized as a standout character in SaGa Frontier.

== Concept and creation ==
Asellus was created for the video game SaGa Frontier; a version of her character was present in the game's early production, when it was the fourth Romancing SaGa title for the Super Famicom. Her story was written by Miwa Shoda, who was given freedom to do what she wanted. The scenario had multiple influences, including Takarazuka Revue, Otome games, Shōjo manga, and others, though Shoda noted that she wanted to avoid copying a specific manga. She stated that she wanted to make a maiden game in a world of demons.

Asellus's introductory story was inspired by a similar dream Shoda had years before, with her character being expanded from that point. Describing how she wrote Asellus, she used her as a vessel for her frustrations surrounding women needing men to save them in fiction, instead wanting Asellus to be an independent woman whom other women would become attracted to. These finer details did not get beyond initial planning, so Shoda changed the premise to a simpler coming-of-age story. A notable element of Asellus is how she speaks in Japanese, sounding masculine or feminine when talking to women or men respectively; Shoda described this an expression of Asellus's "masculine personality", but also noted it could be interpreted as an expression of her Mystic abilities. She also encouraged players to freely interpret Asellus's relationships with different characters.

Asellus was designed by recurring artist Tomomi Kobayashi. When designing her concept and promotional art, Kobayashi imagined her as a "genderless" figure, having a "masculine air" despite being a woman while expressing her status as trapped between human and Mystic existences. Originally Asellus was to have been a redhead, but due to graphical limitations in-game her hair color was changed to green. One prominent piece of art featured Asellus on a couch with the antagonist Orlouge, inspired by Kobayashi's interpretation of the story material that Orlouge was both cruel and obsessed with Asellus. Kobayashi designed her "chibi" form based around the idea of a doll, including her holding an owl as a reference to her artwork featuring Orlouge. Asellus left an impression on Kobayashi due to her not usually designing characters like her.

There were some branching story paths intended to be implemented beyond what made it into the game, but these had to be cut due to time constraints. Some of this content was restored in the 2021 remaster. SaGa Frontier's original director Akitoshi Kawazu identified Asellus' scenario as his favorite part of the series, particularly a scene where Asellus orders the gate to Chateau Aiguille open.

== Appearances ==
Asellus first appeared in 1997's SaGa Frontier as one of the seven main playable characters. She later appeared in the gacha game Romancing SaGa Re;univerSe.

Outside of video games, the character has appeared on multiple bits of merchandise to promote SaGa Frontier, including a long coat, wristwatch, bag, and wallet.

== Critical reception ==
Asellus has been generally well-received by critics and fans. RPGamer's David McBurney praised her as one of the game's more fleshed-out protagonists, finding her story compelling and one of the game's "standout sections", adding that her Half-Mystic status helped set her apart from the other characters. Gamer writer Crazy Kawachi also preferred her to the other protagonists, attributing such to their enjoyment of monsters and half-demons in stories, and enjoyed both of her character routes. He further attributed some of her appeal to her manner of speech changing between masculine and feminine depending on who she was talking to, something they felt gave Asellus a broad appeal with both male and female players. Dengeki Online writer Go identified her as their favorite character in SaGa Frontier, having beaten the game with her multiple times, though lamented that unlike other protagonists she could not be recruited in most other routes for the title. A fan of her character artist Tomomi Kobayashi, they felt she was a perfect example of his work. While Inside Games staff felt that her character's half-human, half-demon setting had universal appeal, and that her interactions with demon characters enhanced this aspect further, they cited that players had been moved by her dignified appearance, and that her gender-defying strength and beauty helped elevate her above other popular SaGa series characters. RPGFan writer Audra Bowling felt that her story was a standout of SaGa Frontier, finding her "self-discovery" of whether she is human, Mystic, or both interesting, and felt that even though some of the narrative was cut from the final game her quest represented a "standout examples of the potential" of the game's approach to storytelling.

She has been recognized as a popular character both as queer representation and as appealing to the LGBTQ+ community, and described as one of the first examples of a lesbian character in video games by journalist Jason Schreier. Gamer writer Crazy Kawachi appreciated that her story could be seen as an introduction to the yuri genre, though felt even those that didn't recognize it as such still enjoyed those aspects of her character. Dengeki Online's staff compared her relationship with White Rose to that of a knight and a princess respectively, while TechRadar writer Georgina Young called the relationship "touching", both outlets attributing some of the game's enduring success to how well players took to the character. RPGFan writer Kyle Seeley noted Asellus as an LGBT character created before such representation became common in video games, feeling that she had more "care and purpose" put into her story, character development, and identity than others. Seeley discussed how Asellus' rejection of her half-Mystic status mirrored that of a "young queer woman coming to terms with her sexuality," and how her later accepting she can't change who she is is a "meaningful message" for anyone. Wired writer Laine Yuhas identified Asellus as her childhood "bisexual video game crush," discussing how she felt like an escape in a world where queer representation was actively fought against, and appreciating that Asellus' story revolves around self-acceptance. She appreciated that characters in SaGa Frontier rather than disliking that she was in love with another woman, disliked that she wouldn't admit it.

While SaGa series director Akitoshi Kawazu did not consider Asellus' story "was a LGBTQ+ one", he expected that it would be interpreted that way, appreciating that those in and out of the LGBTQ+ community enjoyed it, giving validity to such interpretations of the character. He further stated he was grateful for how well the character's story was received, including by the LGBTQ+ community.
