= Emperors SaGa =

2012 video game

- Developers: Square Enix; AltPlus
- Publisher: Square Enix
- Producers: Takehiro Ando; Masato Ichikawa; Tomoya Saishu
- Artist: Tomomi Kobayashi
- Writers: Moku Tochibori; Akitoshi Kawazu
- Series: SaGa
- Platforms: Android; Feature phone iOS
- Release: GREE: JP: September 18, 2012; Docomo: JP: November 25, 2013; Mobage: JP: November 28, 2013
- Genre: Role-playing
- Modes: Single-player, multiplayer

Emperors SaGa (Note: Enperāzu Saga (Japanese: エンペラーズ サガ)) was a 2012 role-playing video game co-developed by Square Enix and AltPlus, and published by Square Enix across multiple mobile networks for both Android and iOS smartphones, and feature phones. A spin-off within the SaGa series, the game is the first non-console entry in the series. The story followed different characters defending their world from hostile divine forces, drawing inspiration from the Romancing SaGa subseries. Its turn-based combat system was based around character cards which could be gained through a gacha system, with skill acquisition and party formation carried over from the SaGa series.

Production began in 2009 as an internal Square Enix project, but quality concerns and the wish to have it playable on smartphone devices prompted the game to be restarted in 2011 with AltPlus as co-developer. The two companies' different design approaches led to some friction during production. Series creator Akitoshi Kawazu supervised the project and contributed scenarios, and recurring illustrator Tomomi Kobayashi provided character designs alongside a number of other artists.

Emperors SaGa was a commercial success for the developers, with one million registered players by 2013. Japanese journalists praised the gameplay and character art, while Western reactions were more varied. Remaining exclusive to Japan, the game was shut down in 2017. The game's success inspired the production of Imperial SaGa (2015), a web browser game with a similar premise, and was credited by Kawazu with reviving interest in the series.

== Premise and gameplay ==
Screenshot of combat in Emperors SaGa

Emperors SaGa was a role-playing social game set in a fantasy world inspired by the Romancing SaGa games, part of the wider SaGa series and featuring characters from different entries. The setting was Chaospolis, a land where multiple worlds overlap, and followed different characters confronting divine threats. The initial player character, the Silver Emperor, fought a being dubbed the Destroyer that was unleashed on his kingdom. Later chapters followed different leads and storylines, including fighting the Silver Emperor of another dimension who was corrupted by dark powers, and the time goddess Ang Lugh who was resurrected and froze all of time. The game was progressed through story-based missions, requiring players to fight enemies. During quests rare Abyss Gates could also appear, featuring a boss that awarded rare in-game items if defeated under a time limit.

The game used a turn-based combat system where characters, represented with cards, auto-battled enemies until one side was defeated. The combat featured multiple recurring mechanics from the SaGa series. During combat, the player characters could randomly learn new moves dubbed "Secret Techniques", while new skills were unlocked for characters by combining duplicate character cards. Some attacks had additional properties, such as guaranteed hits or stunning the enemy. Combining cards could also raise a character card's statistics, a version of the "Inspiration" mechanics from the SaGa series, randomly unlocking new moves during combat. Cards could be arranged in a "formation", another recurring mechanic, which granted boons to the party.

Emperors SaGa used a gacha system, with event completion awarding gacha tickets that could be used to pull new character cards based on the current event. While the core game was free to play, character-specific gacha could be paid for through microtransactions. Completing events raised the player's experience level, awarding three points to distribute between different types of stamina. Healing items were limited in number, gained through the gacha system. Players could also compare event completion scores on a ranking board, and could summon help from players during more difficult event quests. The game's three versions across its providers had small differences ranging from story progression to gameplay mechanics and gacha rarity, and additional elements such as equipping weapons and accessories to characters were added in post-launch updates.

== Development ==
Following the release of Unlimited Saga in 2002, the SaGa series had been mostly dormant beyond remakes of earlier titles. Series creator Akitoshi Kawazu attributed this to both being busy with other gaming projects, and a shift in series owner Square Enix towards an international approach which did not fit with the niche appeal of SaGa. Production on Emperor SaGa began in 2009, with a design and premise based solely on the world of Romancing SaGa 2. It was the first non-console SaGa game to be developed. The initial version ran into production difficulties due to both quality concerns and uncertainty at Square Enix over how to develop mobile games for the emerging smartphone market. The original version of Emperors SaGa, initially an in-house project, was scrapped in 2011. Developer AltPlus had approached Square Enix to develop an original title, but were brought on to help restart production on Emperors SaGa due to their commercial successes in the mobile market.

The game was co-produced by Takehiro Ando and Masato Ichikawa. Ando had previously worked on the Chaos Rings series before being put in charge of mobile titles for both Final Fantasy and SaGa. He described the adaptation process between platforms as difficult since he grew up with the original games and did not want to upset longtime fans with too many changes. Ichikawa also had great respect for the series, and insisted on weekly meetings with Kawazu to make sure the game was faithful to as many SaGa elements as possible. Kawazu had previous experiences working on both mobile games and MMORPG projects, with the team citing his experience as vital for the project. Kawazu also had Ichikawa brought on board to help guide the project under its new direction.

During production of the final version, the Square Enix staff handled the story and art assets, while AltPlus created the game design and architecture. Under Ichikawa's direction, the game changed into being a grander crossover title, taking inspiration from his work on Dragon Quest & Final Fantasy in Itadaki Street Special. Due to differing design philosophies, there was often friction between the two companies. While Ichikawa wanted to make something new for the mobile market, AltPlus wanted to stick to established trends; conflicts ranged from Square Enix's insistence that old art not be recycled, to AltPlus criticising the initial tutorial length. Implementing SaGa mechanics into the card-based combat also proved challenging, with the Formation system added in just weeks before the game's release. Due to a combination of its game design and platforms, Emperors SaGa featured no sound.

Following the project restart, Ichikawa brought on writer Moku Tochibori, who had just completed work on Final Fantasy Type-0 (2011). While the basic worldview and original characters were carried over from the earlier version, the story was completely rewritten. It was Tochibori who suggested a setting which blended all of the Romancing SaGa titles, and the team created a story bible to maintain consistency going forward. AltPlus initially advised against a scenario as it might put off casual players, but Ichikawa insisted on it due to the series' story-driven legacy. Kawazu provided oversight for the scenario, and occasionally contributed narrative events during the game's life. While Ichikawa was unable to implement the "Free Scenario System" seen in mainline SaGa titles, he and the team did adjust the story going forward based on player feedback, keeping the story fluid.

Ichikawa remembered one point of disagreement between Square Enix and AltPlus was AltPlus's insistence on including moe character designs, which Square Enix rejected. Kawazu insisted they bring in Tomomi Kobayashi, who had worked on multiple entries. Kobayashi initially designed the leading Emperor and an alternate Empress, along with eight character jobs. Her design for the Emperor and Empress was inspired by their "commoner" background and ability to charm anyone they meet. Kobayashi also created designs for characters mentioned but not seen in the SaGa series, basing them on story summaries provided by Kawazu. Additional character artists also worked on the game, including members of Taiwanese artist group Friendly Land. For the game's fourth chapter, the lead characters were designed by Gen Kobayashi. The background art was designed by external company Meteorise.

== Release ==
Square Enix registered the "Emperors SaGa" trademark in September 2010, and was officially announced on September 16, 2011 during the Tokyo Game Show as part of Square Enix's expansion of its properties across then-current and upcoming platforms; pre-registration for this version opened the same day. While initially announced for an autumn closed beta in 2011, the pivot towards smartphones prompted Square Enix to cancel its pre-registration and move its prospective release into the summer of 2012. Pre-registration for its release version opened in August 2012, offering a powerful card with original artwork by Kobayashi as a reward.

Emperors SaGa first released on the GREE platform on September 18, 2012. It later released on the NTT DoCoMo platform on November 25, 2013, and for Mobage on November 28 that year. It was following the additional platform releases that Tomoya Saishu joined as a producer. The game could be played on Android and iOS smartphones, and older feature phones. While advertised by GREE as one of the titles intended for their new global network, no version of the game released outside Japan.

The story was released in five chapters between 2012 and 2016. The game had multiple crossover collaborations with other games including Fantasy Earth Zero and Final Fantasy Tactics S in 2013; Brave Frontier, Million Arthur and Rise of Mana in 2014; and Guardian Cross in 2015. Emperors SaGa ultimately ended its service on April 28, 2017, with the decision prompted by increasing difficulty providing a satisfactory service for all players.

== Reception ==
At release Emperors SaGa became AltPlus's highest selling title for two consecutive months, and by October 2013 had over one million registered players. At the GREE Platform Awards 2012, Emperors SaGa was given the "Best RPG Award".

In a preview of the game at the 2012 Tokyo Game Show, 4Gamer.net noted that casual players unfamiliar with the SaGa series would find enjoyment in collecting cards and viewing their artwork. Dengeki Online noted that the gameplay had unexpected depth in how SaGa mechanics were incorporated into the card-based combat, additionally praising the storyline and character artwork.

Michael Baker of RPGamer heavily disliked the game when he played a demo of it, calling it overly derivative of the Romancing SaGa games and finding its controls unresponsive. 1UP.com's Chris Pereira included it on a list of five notable Japanese mobile games unlikely to come to North America, highlighting the workload in localizing a role-playing game while pleased that the SaGa series was getting a new entry after its prolonged hiatus. Anthony John Agnello, writing for Digital Trends, highlighted Emperors SaGa as part of the Japanese gaming industry's wider move towards casual social and mobile games as major sources of revenue.

== Legacy ==
Prior to the release of Emperors SaGa, the SaGa series had been exclusive to home consoles, but afterwards the series would expand onto mobile and browser platforms. Kawazu also attributed Emperors SaGa with revitalising interest in the SaGa series following its prolonged inactivity. Ichikawa would go onto to become a recurring producer for the SaGa series alongside Kawazu.

Inspired by the popularity of Emperors SaGa, Square Enix producer Kei Hirono wanted to create an equivalent title for PC browsers and expand the SaGa series further. The game, Imperial SaGa, was released developed by Think & Feel and released in 2015 as part of the series' 25 Anniversary celebrations; it ran until 2019, when it shut down due to the discontinuation of Adobe Flash. A sequel, Imperial SaGa Eclipse was developed as a replacement and operated between 2019 and 2024.
