= Romancing SaGa Re;univerSe =

2018 role-playing video game

- Developers: Akatsuki Games; Square Enix
- Publisher: Square Enix
- Director: Riki Nakata
- Producer: Shuhei Yamaguchi
- Artists: Satoshi Kuramochi; Sara Takahashi
- Writers: Moku Tochibori; Nagi Chiyoko; Seishun Kyakuhon; Akitoshi Kawazu
- Composer: Kenji Ito
- Series: SaGa
- Platforms: iOS, Android
- Release: JP: December 6, 2018; WW: June 3, 2020
- Genre: Role-playing
- Modes: Single-player, multiplayer

Romancing SaGa Re;univerSe (Note: Romanshingu Sa Ga Ri:Yunibāsu (Japanese: ロマンシング サガ リ・ユニバース)) is a 2018 role-playing video game co-developed by Akatsuki Games and Square Enix, and published by Square Enix in Japan for iOS and Android. A global version was run by Akatsuki Taiwan between 2020 and 2024. A spin-off within the SaGa series, the story follows different characters as they confront magical threats with the aid of warriors from other SaGa games. The first three arcs are set three centuries after Romancing SaGa 3 (1995), while later arcs take place in alternate realms. The gameplay carries combat mechanics from the SaGa series while incorporating additional gameplay mechanics and a gacha system for characters and weapons.

Production on Re;univerSe began in 2016, with series creator Akitoshi Kawazu serving as executive producer and contributing to the writing. Other recurring SaGa staff included writer Moku Tochibori, artists Satoshi Kuramochi and Sara Takahashi, and composer Kenji Ito. The team's goal was a game that replicated the experience of a SaGa title for smartphone platforms, along with being friendly to series newcomers and free players. Re;univerSe saw ten million downloads within its first month, and as of September 2023 has achieved thirty million downloads. The game saw praise from Japanese and Western journalists at launch for its game design, graphics, original music and generous gacha system. Related merchandise includes four soundtrack albums, a manga adaptation, and a stage play.

== Gameplay ==
Screenshot of combat in Romancing SaGa Re;univerSe

Romancing SaGa Re;univerSe is a role-playing video game in which the player takes on the role of different characters across multiple scenarios exploring a threat to their world; among the available playable cast are characters from multiple entries in the SaGa series. The game is progressed through a chapter-based episodic narrative, with combat and boss-related stages which players complete to progress the story, accessed through a main hub; characters can also be sent on "Expeditions" and for "Training" to strengthen them so story content can be cleared. The game features multiple difficulty levels, with clearing missions on higher difficulties granting greater loot rewards.

The combat uses a turn-based combat system where players control a party of five characters from their current stock; actions are selected at the beginning of each turn and play out alongside the enemy side's turn, defeating at least three waves of enemies to win. Players can control each battle manually, or use an auto-battle mode which has party members use either just normal attacks or skills based on their chosen behaviour pre-set. Each side has elemental strengths and weaknesses which can be exploited, and different damage types dictated by their weapon. During combat the party is arranged in Formations, which grant different effects upon the party based on character positions.

Each character has access to both normal attacks, and skills which use Battle Points (BP). BP is awarded both at the beginning of each turn and from performing normal attacks. Some skills include additional effects such as stunning enemies or inflicting status effects. By attacking and receiving damage, each character builds up an Overdrive meter, which when full can be used to enhance a chosen skill and ensure the character moves before the enemy. Skills active during Overdrive can also form combination attacks, which successively multiply their damage. Overdrive cannot be activated during auto-battle.

After completing a battle, party members gain experience points to raise their level and can randomly learn new skills. If the chosen party runs out of health, the battle ends and the player has the option to retry and reorganise their party. Characters can also be trained in a separate "Dojo" area, and sent on training missions while leaving the game idle for limited statistic gains. Repeatedly fighting weaker enemies does not generate stat growth, requiring the party to fight stronger enemies as their own power level rises. After completing available single-player content, a multiplayer mode is unlocked where players cooperate in gaining control of a designated territory during "Conquest" events.

Most characters and their variants, dubbed "Styles", are unlocked through a gacha system, with character rarity using three letter codes; "A", "S" and "SS", the latter being the rarest. Gacha pulls can be rerolled for free a limited number of times, then further rolls can be purchased with microtransactions. In addition to being gacha rewards, high rank characters are awarded for free upon completing quests. Having multiple duplicates of the same character Style increases their stats and allows for abilities to be shared between them. The gacha also includes materials which can be used to raise a character's level cap. Different currencies are awarded to players who are active regularly, along with limited time events that grant additional rewards.

== Synopsis ==
The story of Re;univerSe is told in episodic narrative arcs; the first three arcs take place in the same world as Romancing SaGa 3 (1995), following a continuous narrative covering a large period of time as different threats appear. The initial arc is set on the eve of a new Eclipse, an event of catastrophe in the world, during a time when the original game's events are considered a legend. Acrobat-turned-soldier Polka searches for his sister Liz, who becomes key to a scheme to revive the Archfiend. While one of the Archfiend's loyal followers is defeated, the Archfiend briefly manifests and makes Liz pregnant with twin Children of Fate, who can reshape the world. Fifteen years later, Liz's children Josephine and Bertrand rejoin their family to prevent the Archfiend's true revival. Confronting the Archfiend's new vessel, an ancient power-hungry emperor, Josephine sacrifices herself to defeat it.

The next two arcs—one full-length and one described as a "short story"—are set twenty-five years later. The Clavis group, including new member Liam, investigate an outbreak of comas which is traced to a group dubbed the Five Divine Beasts, who seek to revive their master the Aberrant God. They successfully defeat the Aberrant God when it is summoned, awakening the coma victims. Following this, the wandering poet Shirei hires Liam to recover his magical biwa from remnants of the Divine Beasts' human cult. Shiren successfully recovers his biwa, preventing further hostilities between Clavis and the cult, which had attempted to use the biwa to create a new reality for themselves.

Following the third arc's conclusion, the story shifted to a different world with a new running narrative. In the "Cloud Realm" arc, set in a skybound magical university, a group of students led by Lilac pursue a school friend who is revealed to have a hidden magical power tied to the existence of their world. In the ongoing "Koyomi" arc, set in the realm of Bardolia as a newly-formed national alliance confronts distortions in their reality, Koyomi Iizuna awakens to magical powers that can fight the monsters appearing from the rifts.

== Development ==
Production on Romancing SaGa Re;univerSe began in 2016, after mobile game developer Akatsuki Games was approached by series owner and publisher Square Enix with the project proposal. Smartphones were chosen by Square Enix for a new SaGa title as an accessible and widespread platform, with the design goal being to capture the essence of SaGa on a modern mobile platform while also distinguishing itself from both other SaGa entries and other mobile games. Series creator Akitoshi Kawazu served as executive producer, and contributed to the world building and scenario. SaGa series producer Masato Ichikawa co-produced the game with Akatsuki's Shuhei Yamaguchi, with Akatsuki's Riki Nakata serving as director. A number of staff who had worked on SaGa: Scarlet Grace (2016) also joined the project. Production required weekly meetings between Square Enix and Akatsuki, with team members from both sides closely collaborating to ensure the game's mechanical and visual design matched the rest of the SaGa series. Re;univerSe was described by Ichikawa as "both a sequel and a spin-off" to the Romancing SaGa games, with Kawazu saying its status as the SaGa series' first direct sequel presented unspecified challenges for the staff.

Yamaguchi described the incremental progression he noticed in many SaGa titles as ideally suited for a mobile game, with the development team wanting to carry over as many SaGa mechanics as could be managed. During its early production the game followed the pattern of other popular social games at the time, with a focus on nostalgia and standard gacha mechanics, but Square Enix objected to this approach. The team refocused on creating a mobile version of SaGa, which required developmental restructuring for the Akatsuki team, with multiple team members played through the SaGa titles to gather knowledge of its gameplay structure and mechanics. Due to the game's monthly instalment structure, the "Free Scenario System" associated with the Romancing SaGa titles was not included. Describing the gacha mechanics, Ichikawa described their design goal as a system where players could progress the game with whatever characters they had rather than gating progress behind specified character requirements. This required careful balancing of the game's difficulty and gacha mechanics so both free and paying players could have a positive playing experience. Character abilities being tied to the gacha was considered early in development, but this was scrapped due to deviating from the SaGa formula too much. As part of the gacha balancing, healer characters were scarce, with available characters instead focusing on healing high damage. Ichikawa described the game's design fairly complex for a mobile gacha title, feeling this would keep it unique within the market.

As Re;univerSe was going to be based on Romancing SaGa 3, it was decided to make the initial storyline a sequel to it. The initial storyline was written by Imperial SaGa's Moku Tochibori, who described the scenario has informed by the game's contrasting design goals of being both faithful to SaGa and accessible for newcomers. Kawazu described initial protagonist Polka as an active protagonist compared to the usual passive characters he created for earlier SaGa games. Kawazu contributed to the premise and world design, supervised the overall narrative design, created flavor text for all the characters. Beginning with Liam's scenario, Nagi Chiyoko was brought in to help with writing. Shirei and his story were co-created by Tochibori and Chiyoko, based on Chiyoko wanting a more upbeat continuation and to the ending of Liam's scenario. It also filled in a gap in story production, as the team wanted to do something entirely new for the next arc and needed extra development time. For the "Cloud Realm" arc, the storyline was rebooted and Seishun Kyakuhon took over as lead writer. He had previously worked on Emperors SaGa (2012), and due to his work having no relation to earlier story content, he felt a lot of pressure to create something that would stand out. As the scenario was set within a school, Kyakuhon wrote the story inspired by dramas with ensemble casts, switching lead character with each instalment.

Characters for the first three arcs were designed by Satoshi Kuramochi, who had worked on Scarlet Grace. Taiwanese illustrator Pump also contributed character designs. Beginning with the "Cloud Realm" arc, main character designs were done by Sara Takahashi, who had worked on SaGa: Emerald Beyond (2024) and contributed clothing and enemy designs for earlier Re;univerSe arcs. Kyakuhon provided a design guideline of being similar yet distinct in design, with each wearing their school dress differently to reflect their personalities. For the in-game graphics, the team used a pixel art style based on Romancing SaGa 3, wanting to appeal to both series veterans and newcomers. Akatsuki directly imported graphical assets from the remasters of Romancing SaGa 2 (1992) and Romancing SaGa 3 into Re;univerSe. For characters from other titles that did not use pixel art for their sprites, their designs were modified to work within the pixel art style. While human characters were easy to transfer into pixel style, monsters and bosses were difficult due to their increased size.

=== Music ===
The new music was composed by Kenji Ito, a recurring composer for the SaGa series, with Hidenori Iwazaki as music director. In addition to original music, the game featured arrangements of earlier SaGa tracks created by Ito, Masashi Hamauzu and Nobuo Uematsu. Ito described his musical direction for Re;univerSe as emulating the style of the original Romancing SaGa titles; he primarily focused on orchestra, with the new battle theme using rock music as a contrast. "Beneath the Banner", used for the game's hub, was the first track Ito created. Iwasaki took on the role of managing studio recordings and instrument choice, working with Ito and allowing him the final say on musical direction during recording.

Musical arrangements were primarily handled by a team that included Noriyuki Kamikura, Minako Seki, Yohei Kobayashi, and Tsutomu Narita. Kamikura described the arranging process as difficult due to Ito providing no guidance, only offering feedback when an initial draft was created. To recreate elements of the earlier games' sound design, he used original sampler hardware from the time. Additional guest arrangers included Ryo Yamazaki, Chiemi Takano, Yoshitaka Hirota, Sorao Mori, and Kohei Tanaka. Vocals across the game's soundtrack have been provided by Ayano Nonomura, Kyoko Kishikawa and Kocho.

The game's music has seen four soundtrack album releases so far. The first album, Romancing SaGa Re;univerSe Original Soundtrack, was published by Square Enix's music label on April 10, 2019. The second, subtitled Vol.2, was released on May 25, 2022 and covered music from the first arc's second part not included in the initial release. Vol.3 was released on September 25, 2024, featuring music from the "Liam" and "Shirei" arcs, and the anniversary track "Entrance: Celestial Fulcrum". A fourth volume was released on August 19, 2026, covering music from the "Cloud Realm" and "Koyomi" arcs.

== Release ==
Re;univerSe was announced in September 2018 at the Tokyo Game Show alongside a remaster of Romancing SaGa 3, with pre-registration opening in October with associated rewards and a social media campaign with a book of Tomomi Kobayashi artwork. The game released in Japan on December 6, 2018. The initial arc, which was split into two parts, ran from 2018 to 2021. The second arc, which focused on Leon and Shirei, ran from 2021 to 2024. The "Cloud Realm" arc began in 2024, and the current "Koyomi" arc began in 2026. Alongside the main story, the team released smaller events introducing characters from across the series; during the game's early phase some intended events could not be added due to the COVID-19 pandemic impacting development.

A global release for Re;univerSe was announced in November 2019, with pre-registration opening in May 2020. Servers for the global version of the game were handled by Akatsuki Taiwan, with its development being a collaborative effort between Akatsuki and Square Enix's Japanese and Western branches. It released globally on June 24, 2020. In an interview, Ichikawa noted that the team wanted the global release to have more frequent content updates and have new characters releasing overseas first to appeal to Western SaGa fans. He described the global version as "an extremely powered-up version" of the Japanese release. The international version operated until December 2, 2024 when it was closed down. The announcement gave no specific reason, but cited "challenges" with operating the global version of the game.

=== Merchandise ===
Re;univerSe has seen supplementary material released, beginning with an artbook released on March 18, 2020 to commemorate the game's first anniversary. A second artbook, covering the rest of the first arc, released on March 3, 2022. A stage play based on the game was performed during February and March 2023; Kawazu, Tochibori and Ito returned to handle world design, scriptwriting, and music. A manga adaptation covering the initial story arc was serialised through Manga Up! and published in two tankōbon volumes on June 7, 2022 and February 7, 2024. In 2025, Onkyo collaborated with the game by releasing a themed version of its CP-TWS01E wireless headphones.

== Reception ==
Reception

Review scores
Publication	Score
RPGFan	85%
AppGet	4.5/5

Within its first month of release, Re;univerSe achieved ten million downloads in Japan. In their 2019 fiscal report, Square Enix noted the game as a profitable entry during a period when their other mobile projects had been underperforming. By August 2020 the game reached 25 million downloads, and continued to contribute positively to Square Enix's income during that year. As of September 2023, Re;univerSe had reached thirty million downloads worldwide.

While limited, reactions to the story were generally positive. Shohei Yoshida of AppGet highlighted the original storyline and its characters as one of the game's selling points. In his review, Patrick Gann of RPGFan found the story compelling after an uninspired start, highlighting the mystery surrounding the original cast of Romancing SaGa 3. RPG Site's James Galizio was less impressed, but felt players familiar with the Romancing SaGa games would enjoy it. Trent Gleason of RPGamer felt the story was lacking in compelling substance for casual players.

Commenting on the game's graphics, Galizio praised the pixel design of the sprites, and the quality of both classic and new character portraits. Gleason praised the combination of classic and modern graphical elements in the presentation, and called the soundtrack "a stellar combination of rearranged and classic music". Gann positively compared the game's character and environment sprites to the Romancing SaGa 3 remaster, and enjoyed the original music despite finding it overused across his playtime. Yoshida, while not giving much commentary, positively noted the inclusion of classic character art in the game's loading screens.

The game's combat was the main focus of praise for most writers. In a review after completing the first storyline that primarily focused on gameplay, Famitsu writer Nishikawa praised the more traditional character growth and combat balance compared to similar mobile games. GameBiz.jp's Yoshito Taniyama praised the overall combat design and traditional design, finding the incorporation of SaGa-specific mechanics a "breath of fresh air" in the mobile gaming genre. Gann found the combat and mechanical incentives to use multiple characters to be one of the game's strengths; his main complaint was the grinding necessary for later content. Gleason, while faulting convolution in its character growth systems and noting the mobile-specific elements still present in-game, praised the incorporation of SaGa mechanics into combat. Galizio called combat "a ton of fun", feeling like he was playing a console SaGa title more than a typical mobile game, although he was unsure about the game's continued viability and quality. The Japanese reviewers noted the higher difficulty options available, citing it as a draw for series fans. The gacha mechanics were also praised as both generous and unintrusive, making a free to play approach viable.
