= Romancing SaGa 3 =

1995 video game

- Super Famicom cover art by Tomomi Kobayashi
- Developer: Square (Note: Remaster developed by ArtePiazza.)
- Publishers: Square (1995); Square Enix
- Director: Akitoshi Kawazu
- Producer: Michio Okamiya
- Designers: Akitoshi Kawazu; Kyoji Koizumi
- Artist: Tomomi Kobayashi
- Writer: Akitoshi Kawazu
- Composer: Kenji Ito
- Series: SaGa
- Platforms: Super Famicom, Android, iOS, Nintendo Switch, PlayStation 4, PlayStation Vita, Windows, Xbox One
- Release: Super Famicom: JP: November 11, 1995; Android, iOS, Switch, PS4, PS Vita, Windows, Xbox One: WW: November 11, 2019
- Genre: Role-playing
- Mode: Single-player

Romancing SaGa 3 (Note: Romanshingu Sa Ga Surī (Japanese: ロマンシング サ・ガ3)) is a 1995 role-playing video game developed and published by Square for the Super Famicom (Super Nintendo Entertainment System) as a Japanese exclusive. A remaster was released worldwide in 2019 by Square Enix for mobile platforms, consoles and Windows. The sixth entry in the SaGa series, it follows eight characters who are drawn into the search for the Child of Destiny, a figure who could bring either salvation or ruin to the world. Gameplay has the chosen character exploring the world, completing a variety of quests and with some characters engaging in campaign-specific mini-games. The turn-based combat carries over established SaGa mechanics including usage-based statistic growth and learning new moves based on a character's weapons and combat actions.

Production began in 1993 shortly after the completion of Romancing SaGa 2. series creator Akitoshi Kawazu returned as director, writer and co-designer. Other returning staff included battle designer Kyoji Koizumi, character designer Tomomi Kobayashi, and composer Kenji Ito. Kawazu returned to the world structure of the original Romancing SaGa, and took in staff suggestions when creating its character-specific mini-games. The remaster began development during 2017, with the goal being to replicate the original game on modern hardware. Due to loss of the original assets, parts of the game had to be reconstructed.

Romancing SaGa 3 sold over one million copies in Japan, and saw generally positive reviews. Journalists mainly praised its open-ended gameplay design, music and graphics. Criticism focused on its storyline, and a lack of explanation of its mechanics. The remaster was further praised for its faithful graphical upgrade. The staff began developing a fourth Romancing SaGa, but it was moved to the PlayStation and renamed SaGa Frontier (1997). The setting of Romancing SaGa 3 was later used for the initial storylines of Romancing SaGa Re;univerSe (2018). A 3D remake of the game, Romancing SaGa 3: Destinies United, is set for release in February 2027 for PlayStation 5, Nintendo Switch, Nintendo Switch 2, Xbox Series X and Series S and Windows.

== Gameplay ==
A battle in the 2019 remaster of Romancing SaGa 3 against an early-game boss.

Romancing SaGa 3 is a role-playing video game in which the player takes control of one of eight playable characters with dedicated opening campaigns. Additional characters, including the other potential protagonists, can be found and recruited to the party throughout the game. After the initial storyline, the game follows a version of the recurring "Free Scenario System", giving the player complete freedom to complete both main objectives and side quests in any order. How the player chooses to complete a quest influences the character's "Karma", which can open or lock potential quests. The player unlocks new locations by talking to non-playable characters, or travelling there either with vehicles or by opening a quest. While in towns, the player can rest at inns and shop using the in-game currency for weapons and equipment. Party members can be recruited across the game, while some will force their way into the party.

While exploring dungeon environments beyond towns, enemies are represented using sprites, with the party engaging in battle when they touch an enemy. Battles use a turn-based combat system, with a party of up to five characters arranged in a Formation, with different Formations providing different boosts to the party such as speed and attack power. The player selects the party's actions and then the turn plays out, with the party and allies performing actions including attacking, healing, and defending. Each character has an initial preferred weapon, but can be equipped with any weapon by the player, with certain attack abilities locked to weapon types.

As with other SaGa titles, there is no experience point system, with characters instead raising their health or stat attributes at the end of a battle. What stats are raised is determined by actions taken in battle, and a character's innate attributes. Depending on actions taken in battle and a character's weapon proficiency, new abilities can also be unlocked through the "Glimmer" system. Characters have a limit of eight skill slots, with the player needing to replace skills when slots are full and a new skill is Glimmered, but once a skill is mastered through repeated use it can be taught to any of the characters.

Each party member has health (HP) which regenerates after a successful battle, SP and MP to use for physical and magical abilities respectively, and Life Points (LP) which has a limit for each character. When knocked out in battle, a character loses one LP, and if attacked while unconscious they continue to lose LP. If most characters lose all LP they are subject to permanent death, with the main character's death or a party defeat resulting in a game over. These different health and magic metres are restored by resting in towns at an inn or using items.

There are additional modes and minigames available, some dependant on the selected playable character. "Commander Mode" has the player character controlling the rest of the party from the reserve slot, issuing general commands that they act upon. While playing as Mikhail, the player must manage a nation and participate in a war minigame, which has two sides fighting each other with command-based attack or defence actions with strength determined by a Morale meter. In Thomas's route, the player can engage in a trading system, completing merchandise deals to earn in-game currency. The 2019 remaster includes a New Game Plus option, allowing the player to start a new playthrough using data from another save file, and an autosave after each combat encounter.

== Synopsis ==
In the game's backstory, an event called the Rise of Morastrum occurs once every three centuries; a solar eclipse occurs, with every newborn of that year except one destined to die; this survivor is called the Child of Destiny and receives great power. 600 years prior, the Child of Destiny became an evil ruler called the Archfiend, while 300 years prior the Child of Destiny was a hero called the Matriarch who toppled the Archfiend. Prior to the game's opening, the Rise of Morastrum occurs again, and people begin seeking the Child of Destiny to discover their eventual fate. The eight main characters, all known or acquainted with each other, set out on their own quests and end up involved in the hunt for the Child of Destiny. The eight are Julian Nord, a reckless and just swordsman; the tomboyish Ellen Carson; Sarah Carson, Ellen's shy younger sister; Thomas Bent, a fledgling businessman; Mikhail Ausbach von Loanne, the current Marquis of Loanne; Monika Ausbach, Mikhail's sister; Katarina Lauran, Monika's attendant and guardian of a relic of the Matriarch; and Khalid, a wandering mercenary exiled from his homeland.

During their journey, the chosen protagonist learns that the Rise of Morastrum is tied to a realm called the Abyss and its ruling Four Sinistrals, which creates the heralding eclipse to manifest their power through the Child of Destiny. The Matriarch's birth and rise to heroism prompted the Sinistrals' fall, but with the latest Rise of Morastrum the Abyss Gates linking their realm to the world open again. It is also revealed that this time, two Children of Destiny have been born; Sarah and a man referred to as the "Young Boy". The chosen protagonist and their party close the Abyss Gates and defeat the Sinistral clones sent through to wreak havoc in the world. Depending on the chosen character, one of the Children will attempt to sacrifice themselves to the Abyss to maintain peace until the next Rise of Morastrum, but the party and the other Child follow through a surviving Abyss Gate. In the Abyss, Sarah and the Young Boy combine their powers, awakening Oblivion, a being embodying the Abyss's power. Oblivion's death decimates reality, but Sarah and the Young Boy use their power to restore the world.

== Development ==
Early work on Romancing SaGa 3 began at series developer and publisher Square in December 1993 shortly after the release of Romancing SaGa 2, with full production beginning in the summer of 1994. Series creator Akitoshi Kawazu returned as director, designer and writer. Other returning staff included Kyoji Koizumi as battle designer, and sound designer Minoru Akao. The game was produced by Michio Okamiya, who was chosen by Kawazu after previously working in the company's advertising division. Kawazu described production as "troublesome".

While Kawazu wanted to return to the narrative and gameplay style of the original Romancing SaGa, he was unsure how to do it while innovating on the design. An early suggestion was to make the game a direct sequel to Romancing SaGa, but Kawazu wanted it to be an entirely original work. With this game, Kawazu became "more proactive" in designing side quests that players could enjoy and get lost in. Kawazu gathered ideas from the development team, which led to the character-specific mechanics such as Mikhail's war campaign and Thomas's trading mini-games. They were originally grander than the final versions, with Kawazu intending players to clear the whole game using these character-specific mechanics. Ultimately the battle system was the strongest element out of the implemented mechanics, so it became the dominant gameplay feature. Kawazu never intended players to play through the game as all the characters, so there were no completion bonuses.

The scenario was designed to combine the freedom of choice of earlier titles with the overarching narrative, with all the protagonists being part of a shared world and crossing paths during the adventure. The original story began with the concept that humans worldwide have superstitions regarding eclipses. Kawazu built on that the premise that there is something to fear, and that eclipses meant death to many people, so any survivors would be special. When writing the story, Kawazu decided that the heroic Matriarch should be a woman as traditionally the demonic antagonists of games at the time were male. This naturally led into the plot twist of there being two Children of Destiny, a man and a woman. Kawazu did not communicate this clearly to the development team, so when graphic designer Hiroshi Takai created the opening cinematic, he wrote the Matriarch as a "Hero King". A feature Kawazu had to drop was the characters realistically changing clothes during their adventure, which would have been prohibitively complicated.

The characters were designed by returning artist Tomomi Kobayashi. She wanted to achieve a "classic [and] cool" look for her characters, aiming for an elegant style. One of the designs she remembered as a challenge were the non-human characters such as a lobster and a snowman. Speaking of the snowman specifically, Kawasu originally wanted a European stereotypical snowman, which she created after an early draft design based on the Michelin Man was rejected. Kobayashi's favorite characters to design were Leonid and Mikhail. Kazuyuki Ikumori returned as graphical designer, with Romancing SaGa 3 being his last work on the SaGa series. Kazuko Shibuya returned to as sprite artist for the game after being abscent for Romancing SaGa 2 due to her work on the Final Fantasy series. She was invited onto the project by Kawazu after finishing her work on Final Fantasy VI (1994), and later felt "lucky" to have worked on Square's last two major Super Famicom releases.

=== Music ===
Kenji Ito returned from previous games as both composer and arranger. He later described the work schedule as "crazy", with him collapsing once he had finished his work. Rather than approach the game with a specific theme in mind, Ito allowed his music to evolve; while the opening theme evoked dread, he also wanted the score to represent hope. As Kobayashi's art was complete by the time Ito began work, he used them as inspiration for each character's theme. He later described the track "Four Demon Lords Battle" as a turning point in his music, as he refrained from using a guitar sound for the music. His favourite piece from the score was the character Robin's theme, which was written to parody an unspecified anime opening theme.

Two music albums were published by NTT Publishing; a soundtrack album in November 1995, and an arrangement album in January 1996. A remastered album was released in 2014 by Square Enix, with Ito handling the arrangement. Several of the game's music tracks were featured in Theatrhythm Final Fantasy: Curtain Call (2014) as downloadable content.

== Release ==
Romancing SaGa 3 was released on November 11, 1995. It was the last game in the SaGa series developed for the Super Famicom (Super Nintendo Entertainment System). A notable part of the game's promotion was a live action television commercial directed by Yoshihiko Dai, who worked on multiple commercials for both Square and Enix during the 1990s. Filming for the commercial took place over two weeks in the United Kingdom. Dai chose this as the setting to convey the European medieval atmosphere common to Japanese RPGs at the time. Three guidebooks were published by NTT Publishing between December 1995 and March 1996. The game received Virtual Console re-releases on the Wii in 2010, and the Wii U in 2014. Both versions are now unavailable due to the shutdown of the Virtual Console platform. The Super Famicom version of Romancing SaGa 3 went unreleased outside Japan, due to a combination of its potentially off-putting complexity and the amount of text needing translation.

=== Remaster ===
Kawazu and series co-producer Masanori Ichikawa both wanted to bring earlier SaGa titles to modern platforms, with discussions for a Romancing SaGa 3 remaster during 2016 and 2017 alongside the release of Romancing SaGa 2 on modern platforms. By 2017, Kawazu and Ichikawa were getting into contact with the original programmers, and recovering the game's source code. Kawazu noted that while the Romancing SaGa 2 remaster was based on a mobile port, Romancing SaGa 3 needed developing from scratch. The team added in new content including the New Game Plus and Adventure Log features, a new dungeon, and some new story events created by Kawazu. This new content was made optional so players could have a gameplay experience closer to the original. The remaster was developed by ArtePiazza, who had also worked on the Romancing SaGa 2 remaster and remakes of the Dragon Quest series.

While a popular title, Romancing SaGa 3 had never seen any releases after its Super Famicom version, which was part of the reason the team chose to remaster it for worldwide release. The design goal was to present the game as it would have been on the Super Famicom, adjusted to work in widescreen and with modern high-definition monitors. The backgrounds were redrawn, while the characters and bosses remained as pixel designs, although the bosses were given extra movement. Compared to the Romancing SaGa 2 remaster, the team were missing a lot of original assets, so they needed to rebuild parts of the game, comparing their reconstructed elements to the original game so they could remain as faithful as possible. Kawazu described porting over the war and trading mini-games as "a real challenge". While orchestrating or re-recording the soundtrack was considered, it was instead decided to reproduce the original soundtrack in high quality.

The remaster was announced in March 2017, with Kawazu and Ichikawa noting that full production had not begun. A Western release for both Romancing SaGa 3 and SaGa: Scarlet Grace was announced in June 2019 at E3. Ichikawa said that positive feedback from the Western release of the Romancing SaGa 2 remaster prompted them to localize the next two SaGa projects. It launched worldwide on November 11 that year for Android, iOS, Nintendo Switch, PlayStation 4, PlayStation Vita, Windows and Xbox One. The various versions had different platform-specific features, with the PlayStation versions featuring cross-save functions, the mobile versions supporting cloud saves, and the Xbox version compatible with the platform's Play Anywhere feature.

=== Destinies United ===
A 3D remake of the game, titled Romancing SaGa 3: Destinies United was announced in September 2026, and will be released on February 4, 2027 for PlayStation 5, Nintendo Switch, Nintendo Switch 2, Xbox Series X and Series S and Windows. It was originally hinted at in August by a game rating from Brazil's Ministry of Justice and Public Security. The remake includes expanded gameplay mechanics and difficulty options, character designs by Yoshiro Ambe based on the original designs, and an arranged soundtrack from Ito.

== Reception ==
Reception

Aggregate score
Aggregator	Score
Metacritic	73/100 (NS); 74/100 (PS4)

Review scores
Publication	Score
Famitsu	9/10, 9/10, 9/10, 7/10
Hardcore Gamer	3.5/5
Nintendo Life	6/10
Nintendo World Report	8.5/10
RPGamer	3/5
RPGFan	68%
TouchArcade	4/5
RPG Site	8/10

The Super Famicom original sold 1.3 million units in Japan by 2002, making it the second best-selling Romancing Saga title and at that time third best-selling entry in the SaGa franchise. The remaster's Windows version was among the best-selling new releases of its release month on Steam. (Note: Based on total revenue for the first two weeks on sale.) According to review aggregate website Metacritic, the game saw generally positive reviews, with the PS4 version scoring 74 points out of 100 and the Switch version scoring 73.

Japanese gaming magazine Famitsu praised the gameplay variety through the different characters and customization options, while Jordan Rudek enjoyed both the core combat system and finding the hidden mechanics despite a need to grind and some lack of explanation relating to side quest triggers. Shaun Musgrave of Touch Arcade similarly enjoyed the opaque game design, calling its gameplay the main appeal. RPG Site's Chao Min Wu described the combat as the game's "most interesting [and] unique" feature, citing the need for in-depth knowledge to survive more difficult encounters. RPGFan's Jonathan Logan positively noted the amount of replay value due to the number of characters and New Game Plus feature, but found the combat system and exploration frustrating due to the limitations and randomness of its move and stat mechanics. RPGamer's Pascal Tekaia, while noting an unpleasant difficulty spike during the late game section, enjoyed the combat and its layered character growth systems. Mitch Vogel, writing for Nintendo Life, felt the combat was good but criticised the game as punishing players for lack of mechanical knowledge it had not communicated. Chris Shive of Hardcore Gamer noted the varied combat options given to the player, but felt several of the mechanics had aged poorly compared to later RPG titles.

A lack of explanation for its different mechanics was a recurring criticism, though when mentioned the New Game Plus and Adventure Log features in the remaster were praised. The difficulty divided opinion, with some critics finding it very difficult, and others noting that it was easier than other SaGa titles. Both Tekaia and Logan disliked that some characters forced their way into the party, disrupting established combat dynamics.

While having no specific comments, both Shive and Tekaia praised the translation of the game's sprite work into high definition. Logan described the remaster's updated graphics as "easily the best part of the game", praising both their quality and faithful rendition in HD. Vogel singled out the character sprites for praise, positively noting the work done to keep them faithful to the game's time period. Wu, who had played the original release, felt that the graphical upgrade was good and significantly higher quality than then-recent modern releases of early Final Fantasy titles. Musgrave also noted the high definition upgrade as better than then-recent Final Fantasy ports, leaving much of the original sprite work intact. Reactions to the music were positive, with Tekaia and Logan calling it one of the best of its era. When mentioned, the localization was seen as unremarkable.

Musgrave enjoyed both the initial premise, and the variations provided by the different potential lead characters. Logan positively noted the premise, but the lack of character development or interesting story events left him disappointed. Shive described the story as interesting, but let down by the lack of information given to the player. Rudek compared the multiple character choice to Dragon Age Origins and enjoyed searching for side quests, but called the NPC writing "fairly plain". One reviewer for Famitsu felt abrupt beginnings and endings of narrative sections and high use of proper nouns made the story difficult to follow. Vogel disliked the lack of direction in the narrative, and similar to Famitsu felt the abrupt nature of story sequences made finding the next objective difficult. Wu described the story as "very minimalistic" and not the main draw for potential players, and Tekaia described the characters as lacking any real development.

== Legacy ==
A fourth Romancing SaGa title began development for the Super Famicom in 1995 after Romancing SaGa 3 released. During this period, Square broke from Nintendo hardware to develop for Sony Computer Entertainment's new and more powerful PlayStation console. The game switched to the PlayStation, and consequently Kawazu renamed the project SaGa Frontier. Releasing in 1997 in Japan and 1998 in North America, SaGa Frontier carried over multiple staff from Romancing SaGa 3 including Kawazu, Kobayashi, Koizumi, Shibuya, and Ito.

In 2016, Square Enix approached mobile game developer Atatsuki Games to develop a new Romancing SaGa mobile title, which would use the world of Romancing SaGa 3 for its initial setting and carry over several combat mechanics. The game, Romancing SaGa Re;univerSe, was released in Japan in 2019; Ichikawa described it as "both a sequel and a spin-off" to the Romancing SaGa games. A global version of Re;univerSe was available from 2020 to 2024.

=== Stage play ===
A stage play based on Romancing SaGa 3 was announced in December 2016. Titled Romancing SaGa The Stage: The Day Loanne Burn, the story focused on the tragic backstory of Khalid. The play was performed by the 30-DELUX theatre trope in different Japanese cities between April and May 2017. The story was written by Kawazu, with the script handled by Moku Tochibori, and the play directed by Junji Shimizu, who also portrayed Khalid. Kawazu decided to create a SaGa stage play in 2012, when considering what to do for the series following its 25th Anniversary celebrations. Due to being busy with game production and not finding a theatre group willing to perform it, the project stalled until Tochibori proposed the concept to Shimizu. Khalid was chosen as the focus for audience appeal, and to portray elements of his backstory not shown in-game. Ito also returned to provide new and arranged music, including the vocal theme "Child of Destiny" which tied into the storyline.
