= Tiberius Claudius Asellus =

Tiberius Claudius Asellus is the name of several ancient Roman men:

- Tiberius Claudius Asellus (praetor 206 BCE)
- Tiberius Claudius Asellus (tribune of the plebs 139 BCE)
