= Wild Card (video game) =

2001 video game

- Developer(s): Square
- Publisher(s): Square
- Producer(s): Shinji Hashimoto; Hiroshi Yamaji
- Designer(s): Akitoshi Kawazu
- Programmer(s): Kazuhisa Murakami
- Artist(s): Akihiko Yoshida
- Composer(s): Kenji Ito
- Platform(s): WonderSwan Color
- Release: JP: March 29, 2001
- Genre(s): Role-playing
- Mode(s): Single-player

Wild Card (Note: Wairudo Kādo (Japanese: ワイルド カード)) is a 2001 role-playing video game developed and published by Square for the WonderSwan Color. It was Square's first original title for the platform. The player takes on the role of a protagonist going through a series of freely-available scenarios, building the world based on character interactions. The world, characters and turn-based battle system are represented using cards.

Production, which lasted one year, was led by SaGa creator Akitoshi Kawazu. The main artist was Akihiko Yoshida, while the music was scored by Kenji Ito in one of his last projects before going freelance. Selling 40,000 copies, the game met with a mixed reaction from critics, noting its experimental nature while praising the artwork. Kawazu would revisit the game's card-based style with Unlimited Saga (2002).

== Premise and gameplay ==
Wild Card is a single-player role-playing video game in which players take on the role of a character exploring the game's world. Everything in-game, from locations and characters to items, are represented through cards and static artwork. Set in a world built on stories and belief, the story opens with a narrator recording the oral traditions of their ancestors, which are under threat of extinction. One of these stories tells of a mysterious bright light flew across the sky towards the edge of the world, with the narrator deciding to retell the story and guide the narrative based on how the people might have acted. From that point, the player is tasked with guiding the narrative based on a selection of up to one hundred "scenario cards", progressing the game in a non-linear style.

All gameplay in Wild Card is presented using static artwork and cards.

Upon starting the game, the player is asked a series of questions which determines their starting character from nine possibles; the other eight are then met during the campaign as potential party members. Scenarios are split into three types; finding a destination, fighting an enemy, and discovering and item or person. Progress through scenarios is entirely dependent on the types of cards players have equipped: "swim" cards allow them to cross water, and some cards can make travel through the scenario easier or harder. There is no overworld map or traditional dungeons, with the player instead selecting cards to choose their route through a scenario, sometimes encountering either obstacles that must be overcome using a skill card, or battles.

Combat uses a turn-based system, with the player party having up to five members who can be commanded to attack or be the one to receive enemy attacks. Combat revolves around using cards which outmatch an enemy's attack or defense card values, with battles ending when one side is defeated. The goal is to reduce enemy health to nothing, which is done with standard attacks, skills, and magic abilities. Cards are limited in number and can only be regained upon completing the current scenario, with the player increasing the number of cards they can hold by completing scenarios and using "Card Get" point rewards to purchase new cards. The game ends if all party members are knocked out during battle.

== Development ==
In 1999, Final Fantasy developer and publisher Square partnered with Bandai to produce games for the WonderSwan portable console. Wild Card was handled by a team led by Akitoshi Kawazu, known for creating the SaGa series. Kawazu's team had transferred to working on titles for the WonderSwan console in 1999 following the cancellation of a PlayOnline-focused numbered Final Fantasy title. Kawazu later noted that he handled much of the game's development outside programming and art. He acted as the game's designer, Kazuhisa Murakami was programmer, while Shinji Hashimoto and Hiroshi Yamaji co-produced. According to staff member Kyoji Koizumi, development lasted roughly a year. Akihiko Yoshida created the cover and main art. The in-game illustrations and graphics were handled by a large team including Nobuyuki Ikeda, Kiyofumi Kato, Tonny Waiman Koo, and Toshiaki Matsumoto. The music was composed and arranged by SaGa composer Kenji Ito. It was one of Ito's last projects before leaving Square to become a freelance composer.

Wild Card was released on March 29, 2001, and was only compatible with the WonderSwan Color. The title was Square's first original WonderSwan game. Two guidebooks were published alongside the game; one by DigiCube, and one by Shueisha. Due to the console not releasing outside Japan, Wild Card was not localized. Kawazu later revisited the mechanics and presentation of Wild Card in the PlayStation 2 title Unlimited Saga (2002).

== Reception ==
During 2001, Wild Card ranked among the top three hundred best-selling games, selling over 25,500 units. Square's fiscal report for that year reported the game sold 40,000 copies. In a preview for The Gaming Intelligence Agency, Clifford Chao positively compared Wild Card to the earlier Arcana (1992), noting its unusual card-based presentation and art style. Japanese magazine Famitsu gave the game a score of 23 points out of 40, with several critics noting its unique style but finding its mechanics and progression difficult to adjust to compared to other games on the market. Retro Gamer noted the game's experimental gameplay and praised Yoshida's artwork.
