= The Last Remnant =

2008 video game

- Xbox 360 version cover art of the game, depicting Rush Sykes
- Developer: Square Enix
- Publisher: Square Enix
- Director: Hiroshi Takai
- Producer: Nobuyuki Ueda
- Artist: Yusuke Naora
- Writers: Masato Yagi; Miwa Shoda; Akitoshi Kawazu
- Composers: Tsuyoshi Sekito; Yasuhiro Yamanaka
- Engine: Unreal Engine 3 (original); Unreal Engine 4 (Remastered)
- Platforms: Microsoft Windows; Xbox 360; Remastered; PlayStation 4 Nintendo Switch iOS; Android
- Release: Xbox 360: WW: November 20, 2008; Microsoft Windows: EU: March 20, 2009; NA: March 24, 2009; JP: April 9, 2009; Remastered; PlayStation 4: WW: December 6, 2018; Nintendo Switch: WW: June 10, 2019; iOS, Android: WW: December 12, 2019
- Genres: Adventure, role-playing
- Mode: Single-player

The Last Remnant (ラストレムナント, Rasuto Remunanto) is a role-playing video game developed and published by Square Enix. It was released worldwide for Xbox 360 in November 2008 and for Microsoft Windows in March 2009. A PlayStation 3 version was originally announced as well, but this version was cancelled. A remastered version titled The Last Remnant Remastered was released on PlayStation 4 in December 2018 and for Nintendo Switch in June 2019. The game follows a teenage warrior on a quest to end the war, in a fictional world divided into multiple city-states and inhabited by four different species. Their past includes a conflict over "Remnants", magical artifacts of varying forms. The game features a unique battle system in which the player commands multiple groups, or "unions", of characters rather than individual units.

The Last Remnant is the first Square Enix game to use the Unreal Engine. It was intended by Square Enix president Yoichi Wada to "become a cornerstone for [their] worldwide strategy". The game's soundtrack was released as a three-disc album, composed by Tsuyoshi Sekito and Yasuhiro Yamanaka. The design and dialogue of the game were created to appeal to players worldwide, and motion capture for every character with the English-speaking dialogue.

The game received a weak reception, though it was received more positively by Japanese reviewers than other ones. A common complaint, especially for Xbox 360, was of graphical problems including low framerates and "texture pop-in" where higher resolution textures would suddenly replace lower ones several seconds after a scene had started. Other issues included complaints about the game's storyline and battle system, though these were not as universal. The game received praise for art direction and music.

== Gameplay ==
The battle screen, showing the morale bar at the top, a compass showing the relative positions for each group, the status of the current fighting union, and the order in which each unit in the two fighting unions will take their turn

The game is split between a world area, a battle area and a world map. The player controls Rush Sykes, as he travels around the world screen within an area, with the camera floating behind and slightly above him. Within the world screen, the player can talk to anyone, enter buildings and other areas, or exit to the map screen. The map allows instant travel between different cities and areas, or between different areas within the city. On the battle screen, the game has a three-dimensional area like the world screen with a setting reminiscent of the location, where every character and enemy appear. Instead of random encounters, players enter the separated battle when they touch an enemy on the main world screen. The player can enter a battle with multiple enemies at once, by using a "time-shift" system, which slows the time for Rush to provoke them.

The game features a battle system labeled by Hiroshi Takai as a "turn-based, command-based system using symbol encounters". During a battle, each enemy from the world screen is represented by a group, or "union", of enemies ranging from one to five individual units; similarly the player's forces are composed of multiple unions of three to five units each. The skills of the units in the player's unions, which include both story characters and hireable units not appearing outside of battle, vary according to different parameters. One such parameter is the "morale" bar, which is affected by the events in battle and can have positive or negative effects on the battle forces. Each unit can also learn different attacks, which are divided into categories such as blade attacks and healing magic. At the beginning of each turn the player selects from a group of choices what attack types each union will perform; the player is unable to select the individual attack of each unit. Special attacks require "action points", which continually accrue during each battle. The player selects at the beginning of each turn which enemy union each of their unions will attack. As the enemy makes their selections at the same time, it is possible for a union to be "deadlocked", or forced to fight a different union than the player or enemy had selected. When multiple unions are deadlocked onto the same enemy, some unions can flank the enemy or attack from the rear for more damage.

In addition to battles, the player can take on quests. Many of these take the player to an area immediately after accepting and returning them once completed, while "guild quests" do not require acceptance and may be turned in by the player whenever the accomplishments listed on each completed quests. The units may equip any weapons and accessories. Rush's equipment can be upgraded to many different options, while other units request materials, which can be purchased at stores, acquired in battles or found in areas using a creature called Mr. Diggs. He can upgrade abilities and find types of materials.

== Plot ==
=== Setting and characters ===
The game is set in a fictional world featuring a number of distinct humanoid races: the Mitras, human in appearance, the Yamas, strong fish-like people, the Qsitis, small reptilians, and the Sovanis, feline people with four arms. The world itself is broken up into multiple city-states, each with their own unique culture. The story of the game revolves around "Remnants", ancient and powerful magical artifacts, which have been the cause of several wars. Each Remnant is "bound" to a specific person who can use the power. Powerful ones which remain unbound for too long have the potential to cause a "collapse" and spawn monsters. As Remnants come in varying forms, all cities throughout the world have at least one that their ruler is bound to that assist in governing and bring peace to their assigned realm.

The protagonist is Rush Sykes, a young warrior from a small island. His sister, Irina, is kidnapped at the start of the game. He meets and joins David Nassau, the young ruler of the city-state of Athlum, and his generals: Emma Honeywell, Yama Blocter, Qsiti Pagus, and Torgal. More than a hundred other characters can be recruited, found through quests and at guilds. They have different status and skills. The main villain is the Conqueror, a man invading many cities in the world. He is assisted by Wilfred Hermeien, the leader of the city-state of Nagapur and the ruling council of all of the city-states, and Wagram, a powerful sorcerer.

=== Story ===
The game opens with Rush finding David's army fighting monsters; after he and his Remnant pendant help defeat the monsters, David and his generals decide to help him find Irina. While investigating a Remnant that is about to collapse, Rush and company come across Wagram and Irina, who escape. After chasing Wagram and Irina for several missions, the group attends the Congress meeting of the leaders of the city-states in Elysion, home to the Ark Remnant, which can transport users to the Sacred Lands. The Conqueror arrives at the Congress, binds the Ark, and demands to be given a massive Remnant of the type that each city-state has. His demands are rejected, and he declares war with the support of the "God-Emperor", a 1000-year-old legendary figure.

David takes the lead in opposing the Conqueror in hopes of earning independence for Athlum, which is currently a vassal state to Celapaleis. They successfully defend Celapaleis, but the Conqueror himself attacks Athlum in their absence, killing Emma and somehow taking Athlum's bound Remnant. Rush and company return to Elysion to rescue Irina from Wagram. Irina is revealed to have a special power, that of unbinding bound Remnants, which is why she was kidnapped. They discover that Hermeien is trying to use the Conqueror and Wagram's war to prop himself up as supreme ruler. The party rescues Irina and kills Hermeien, but Wagram escapes. Irina uses Nagapur's Remnant to protect her brother from the Conqueror, destroying half of the city in the process.

Four months later, Rush learns that the council city-states are now trying to find Remnants to fight the Conqueror, who is in turn binding the Remnants of the city-states using tablets based on Irina's power that can unbind Remnants. When the party travels to the God-Emperor's city, Undelwalt, they find Wagram, who tells them that the Conqueror is a Remnant himself. Wagram and the God-Emperor are supporting him in his quest to destroy civilization for misusing Remnants and destroying the balance of the world. The Conqueror attacks Elysion and ascends the Ark, binding it so that no one can follow him; the protagonists search and find a second Ark, the first duplicate Remnant ever found. The party chases the Conqueror through the Sacred Lands, which are revealed to be the birthplace of Remnants. He informs them that he is trying to release Remnants from being controlled, a task was originally supposed to be Rush's, as he is also a Remnant. He believes that their purpose is to take back the Remnants from the world that is misusing them for warfare and destruction. Rush defeats him and sacrifices himself to destroy the source of the Remnants. The game ends, as the Remnants all around the world disappear. After the credits, Rush is heard talking with the Conqueror about returning.

== Development and release ==
The game was created by developers who had previously worked on the SaGa and Final Fantasy game series. It was directed by Hiroshi Takai and produced by Nobuyuki Ueda. The game was written by Masato Yagi and Miwa Shoda, whose work was based on a scenario concept by Akitoshi Kawazu. Kimihiko Miyamae served as the chief artist, and Yusuke Naora served as both art producer and character designer. The Last Remnant marked the first Square Enix game to use Unreal Engine 3. Because they used a licensed engine rather than making their own, the production time needed to display graphical resources onscreen was cut significantly, allowing the team to begin illustrating and experimenting at an early stage. The decision to use a licensed engine, rather than develop their own as was traditional at Square Enix at the time, was made due to concerns in the company of the rising production costs of making a game, and the direct development time savings possible from using an existing engine. Square-Enix's chief technology officer, Julien Merceron, claimed in an interview from February 2010 that most of the completed game's perceived technical shortcomings were caused by a decision to use the Unreal Engine to not only cut development time but also to reduce the number of skilled programmers that would otherwise be on the project.

The development team planned to distinguish the game from Final Fantasy and other role-playing games, through its focus on the battle system. The art direction of the game was focused on making all of the characters stand out on the battlefield, and in making the Remnants stand out in the world screens. The cities were designed to not look very fantastical, so as to make the Remnants more prominent, and were designed early on in the development process to give the impression that the people of the city were living both literally and figuratively under the power of giant Remnants. The game marked several firsts for Square Enix, as it was their first game to be released on the same day in both Japan and internationally, as well as the first to use motion capture of Western voice actors. This resulted in the characters' lips speaking English synced to the spoken dialogue, rather than Japanese. The game was planned from the beginning of development to be released simultaneously worldwide and to be targeted to players worldwide, which impacted the character design and art direction. The design and dialogue were created to appeal to international and Japanese players, rather than being focused on the norms of the Japanese video game market alone.

The game was revealed at a press conference at Shinjuku, Tokyo in May 2007. It was shown as a playable demo at the Tokyo Game Show in September 2008. It was then released on the Xbox 360 in November 2008, and released in late March 2009 for PC. The PC version of the game featured numerous improvements and changes from the original, including the integration of the downloadable content from the 360 version into the main game, enhanced graphical settings, a "Turbo Mode" increasing battle speed, and a New Game Plus option allowing the player to start a new game with the gold and unique items from their first play-through. A PlayStation 3 version was also announced, but never released. Square Enix has not released any official reason for the absence, though Takai said that he found developing for the 360 "a lot easier" than for the PlayStation 3. In December 2019, the game was released on iOS and Android.

=== Music ===
The game was composed by Tsuyoshi Sekito, with assistance from Yasuhiro Yamanaka, who composed 10 of the 97 total tracks and co-composed 2. Prior to the game, Sekito had spent the previous decade primarily arranging the work of other composers for remakes and re-releases of various Square Enix games such as the Final Fantasy series and the Mana series. The soundtrack features the heavy use of orchestral elements, arranged for orchestration by Natsumi Kameoka, and guitar playing by Sekito. The orchestrated pieces were played by musicians from several different orchestras, rather than by a single group. Unlike most role-playing games, the battle music was designed by Sekito to switch between three songs depending on how well the player was doing in the battle. A soundtrack album was released on December 10, 2008, through Sony Music Distribution. It contains 97 tracks across three discs, and has a total length of 3:10:21.

== Reception ==
Reception

Aggregate score
| Aggregator | Score | | | | |
| Aggregator | iOS | NS | PC | PS4 | Xbox 360 |
|---|---|---|---|---|---|
| Metacritic | N/A | 62/100 | 66/100 | 70/100 | 66/100 |

Review scores
| Publication | Score | | | | |
| Publication | iOS | NS | PC | PS4 | Xbox 360 |
|---|---|---|---|---|---|
| 1Up.com | N/A | N/A | B− | N/A | D |
| Famitsu | N/A | N/A | N/A | N/A | 9/10, 10/10, 10/10, 9/10 |
| Game Informer | N/A | N/A | N/A | N/A | 7/10 |
| GameSpot | N/A | N/A | 8.0/10 | N/A | 6.5/10 |
| GameTrailers | N/A | N/A | N/A | N/A | 8.0/10 |
| IGN | N/A | N/A | 6.8/10 | N/A | 5.3/10 |
| TouchArcade | 3.5/5 | N/A | N/A | N/A | N/A |

Square Enix reported that the game had sold 580,000 copies across all versions on March 31, 2009, less than two weeks after the game was released on PC. By January 2016, the PC version of the game had over 800,000 copies linked to Steam accounts, according to Steam Spy. The Last Remnant received a largely mixed reception. It received a more positive reception in Japan than elsewhere, something which the developers credited to different styles of reviewing between cultures. They also felt that the Japanese reviewers scored the game too high. It received a 38/40 from Famitsu magazine; the review praised the battle system for its unique, massive-scale battles reminiscent of Romancing SaGa but refined to a wholly new class. They, however, criticized the learning curve as well, the length of battles, and the inability to choose specific skills for individual units. Famitsu later gave the game their 2008 "Rookie Title Grand-Prize" award.

A common complaint from reviewers was about graphical issues. IGN stated in its review of the Xbox 360 version that the game suffered from extreme technical problems, while GameTrailers named the "persistent graphical issues" as one of the Xbox 360 version's weakest points. GameSpot, IGN, and 1UP.com cited in their Xbox 360 version reviews severe frame-rate problems and "texture pop-in", where the textures were displayed as low resolution for several seconds before being replaced with higher-resolution ones, as some of its main failings. All three review sites, however, gave a higher score for the PC version, citing drastically improved graphical performance, but still with texture pop-in and slow loading times when moving between areas and when entering or exiting a battle as well as unskippable cut scenes. Other issues raised by reviewers included "cluttered screens and annoying 'quests'" noted by GamePro, "over the top" and stereotypical characters opined by Game Informer, a poor and generic story according to IGN and 1UP, and long loading screens and cutscenes which were criticisms brought by G4, 1UP, and the Australian Official Xbox Magazine.

Another common point of complaint among reviewers was the battle system, which was described as "repetitive" by GamePro, frustrating by IGN in their Xbox review, and "boring" and the worst part of the game by 1UP. G4 also criticized the battle system, saying that the game played itself. This criticism was not universal, as GameTrailers cited its "unique battle system" as providing "a lot to enjoy", IGN called it "the most interesting part of The Last Remnant" in their PC review, and GameSpot called it "intriguing" and especially fun in the larger-scale battles. The game's visual style was praised across many reviews, such as those by GameTrailers, 1UP, and GamePro, who described the style as "an innovative 'East-meets-West'", while GameSpot called it a "distinctive fantasy world" that is "beautifully constructed". The music was also a source of praise, and was noted as such in the IGN reviews and the GameSpot reviews, which called it an "excellent symphonic soundtrack" with terrific melodies. GameSpot, in their review, also praised the game's story as "epic", in contrast to many of the other reviews, though they noted that Rush was not "the most interesting leading man" and preferred when the story focused on the Conqueror.

== Remaster ==
A remastered version of the game, titled The Last Remnant Remastered, was released for PlayStation 4 in December 2018, and for Nintendo Switch in June 2019. The remaster features a game engine upgrade from Unreal Engine 3 to Unreal Engine 4, with improved graphics and features. Simultaneously with the release of the remaster the PC and Xbox 360 versions were delisted from Steam and other online retailers. As of 2025, the game is still unavailable for those platforms.
