= SaGa: Scarlet Grace =

2016 role-playing video game

- Japanese PlayStation Vita cover art featuring main antagonist the Firebringer
- Developers: Square Enix Business Division 3 Studio Reel
- Publisher: Square Enix
- Director: Masahiro Kataoka
- Producer: Masanori Ichikawa
- Designers: Yoshimitsu Inagaki; Akitoshi Kawazu
- Artist: Tomomi Kobayashi
- Writer: Akitoshi Kawazu
- Composer: Kenji Ito
- Series: SaGa
- Engine: Unity
- Platforms: PlayStation Vita, Android, iOS, Nintendo Switch, PlayStation 4, Windows
- Release: PlayStation Vita: JP: December 15, 2016; Android, iOS, Nintendo Switch, PlayStation 4, Windows: JP: August 2, 2018; WW: December 3, 2019
- Genre: Role-playing
- Mode: Single-player

SaGa: Scarlet Grace (Note: Saga: Sukāretto Gureisu (Japanese: サガ スカーレット グレイス)) is a 2016 role-playing video game developed by Square Enix and Studio Reel and published by Square Enix for the PlayStation Vita. It is the tenth entry in the SaGa series. An expanded port subtitled Ambitions (Note: Hiiro no Yabou (緋色の野望; lit. "Scarlet Ambition")) was released in 2018 in Japan and in 2019 worldwide for Android, iOS, Nintendo Switch, PlayStation 4 and Windows. The story follows four characters pursuing separate missions across the splintered remains of a dissolved Empire; central to the plot is the Firebringer, a rebellious deity defeated during the Empire's height. Gameplay focuses on the protagonists exploring the nonlinear world, taking part in turn-based battles where skill growth depends on chosen actions.

The game was the series' first original console title since 2002's Unlimited Saga, with development beginning in 2013 to celebrate the series' 25th anniversary. Returning staff included series creator Akitoshi Kawazu as co-designer and scenario writer, artist Tomomi Kobayashi, and composer Kenji Ito. The team designed several aspects of the game based on player feedback from Unlimited SaGa, and incorporated features from both SaGa Frontier and the Romancing SaGa games. Ambitions began development following Scarlet Grace, with improvements based on feedback from the original. The Western version was localised by 8-4. Reception of the game was generally positive, with critics praising its gameplay and design.

== Gameplay ==
SaGa: Scarlet Grace is a role-playing video game in which players take control of four different protagonists through separate scenarios; each character can pick up a group of followers, with up to four joining them in battle. Prior to starting the game, the player is asked a series of questions; the answers allow the game to recommend which character to start with and impact their statistics. The core narrative is advanced by completing events on the game's world map; these events range from battles to story-based interactions with non-playable characters (NPCs). Due to the nonlinear gameplay of Scarlet Grace, events can be completed in any order or ignored entirely, with which events are completed impacting the narrative and later events.

The world map—divided into provinces—is represented using two-dimensional (2D) artwork, while the chosen protagonist is represented using a three-dimensional (3D) model. The types of events present are towns which house story events and vendors such as merchants and blacksmiths, transport points to different areas of the world, and battles of varying difficulty. The protagonist can also engage in "Production", a side activity where the player can initiate trade between the worlds' different regions. Taking part in Production rewards the player with materials to use in crafting. Prior to triggering a battle, the enemy's strength and loot are displayed.

=== Battle system ===
The battle system of SaGa: Scarlet Grace uses a turn-based model, with turn order influencing elements of battle.

Once a battle is triggered on the world map, the player and enemy parties face each other in a themed arena. Battles use a turn-based combat system, with each side able to perform an action per turn. The player's party is arranged in different formations which impact their abilities and tactics. Their actions are dictated by Battle Points (BP), displayed as a line of stars; depending on the amount of available BP, different actions can be taken, and those characters who cannot be assigned a move skip that turn. There are eight weapon types, each with different attributes which impact both how a character fights, how they attack different enemies, and the effectiveness of attacks against enemy types.

Each character has access to battle abilities called Techniques which cost BP to execute. During battle, player and enemy actions are displayed along the bottom of the screen as a "Timeline". Some Techniques can alter the flow of the Timeline, and some attacks can knock an enemy back, pushing their action further down the Timeline. If all characters are adjacent on the Timeline following the end of a turn, a United Attack is triggered, allowing all characters to attack. A United Attack allows actions for the next turn to cost less BP, with the amount of BP reducing further if stronger characters took part and dealt higher damage.

Each party member has health points (HP) and Life Points (LP). HP can be replenished in battle using items and varieties of healing magic, but LP cannot be replenished unless a party member is not in battle. Once a character's LP is depleted, they cannot be used in battle, with LP recovering at the rate of one LP every two completed battles. LP can also be restored in towns in exchange for materials. If the party loses all HP during a battle, the game ends. The player party can also be granted "Benison", boons gifted by the world's deities that can remove status effects, heal the party, or aid them with attacks. Activating a Benison cancels all the party's moves for one turn.

As with previous SaGa titles, raising a character's statistics and acquiring new or more powerful skills is not tied to an experience point-based leveling system. After each battle, a particular statistic is raised based both on the battle's events and which weapons and abilities were used by any particular party member. Using a Technique enough upgrades it to become more powerful, while new Techniques are unlocked by using similar Techniques. Techniques have five levels, with each level yielding more powerful effects. Weapons have a similar system, where Weapon Skills—battle actions tied to weapons—can raise their rank through usage to become more effective and cost less BP to execute, or unlock new Skills. Many Skills and ranks are tied to specific weapons. After completing each battle, players are awarded with weapons, armor, accessories and materials. Weapons and armor can be strengthened using specific materials, with the rank of blacksmiths increasing the quality of the upgrade.

== Synopsis ==
Scarlet Grace is set in an unnamed land. The world worships the Celestials, a pantheon represented by the stars who gave wisdom and culture to humanity; each Celestial governs a different aspect of human life, receiving the worship of particular groups such as farmers or magicians. In ancient times, one Celestial later dubbed the Firebringer betrayed his brethren and was banished from their realm; in addition to granting humanity the gift of fire, he waged war on the other Celestials. Every 150 years, the Firebringer would appear and cause monsters to spawn across the world. Humanity united under the Empire to defend against the Firebringer. After seven battles over a thousand years of fighting, the Firebringer was destroyed. Celebrations gave way to fragmentation as the Empire turned on itself; the last Emperor was assassinated, the Empire divided by his warring sons, and seventy years prior to the game's opening it completely collapsed.

In the world following the Empire's collapse, the remaining forces have created new nations out of the Empire's provinces. They have settled into an uneasy coexistence, although attacks from magical monsters persist. The main narrative is divided between four protagonists; Urpina, Leonard, Taria and Balmaint. Urpina is a princess whose peaceful existence is torn apart when her family home comes under attack, forcing her to take up arms to rescue her brother. Leonard is a farmer seeking the legendary city of Ei-Hanum. Taria senses dangerous disturbances through her pottery and goes in pursuit of phoenixes appearing in the world. The state executioner Balmaint travels to behead his former master Sigfrei after he vows to be reborn seven times following his first execution. Each protagonist is accompanied by a variety of companions recruited along their journey.

The plot of Scarlet Grace is non-linear, with most events being missable by the player or changing depending on previously-activated events. In routes involving Sigfrei, he is revealed to be the human incarnation of the Firebringer, determined to create an age controlled by humanity. Key items across the game are the Scarlet Shards, fragments of the Firebringer's power which grant his titular "Scarlet Grace". Two significant characters are the Celestials Marigan and Macha; the respective patrons of warriors and mages, they are veterans of the battle against the Firebringer and once shared a close sibling bond. Each has some involvement with a protagonist's story, with Marigan in particular wanting to steal the Firebringer's power and set himself up as the supreme ruler of all. Each route eventually ends in a battle with the Firebringer in Ei-Hanum. In the wake of his defeat, the protagonists return to their former lives and their companions go on to different fates in a war that engulfs the land.

== Development ==
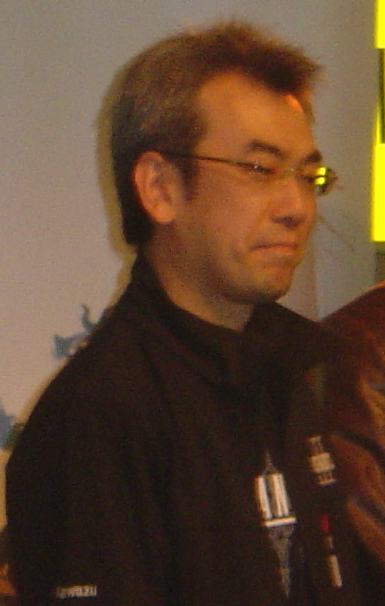
Series creator Akitoshi Kawazu (pictured 2007) acted as game designer and scenario writer for SaGa: Scarlet Grace.

The SaGa series had been dormant since the releases of 2002's Unlimited Saga and the remake of Romancing SaGa in 2005, both for the PlayStation 2 (PS2). Series creator and executive producer Akitoshi Kawazu's commitment to other projects within Square Enix, including the Crystal Chronicles series, prevented him from pursuing further SaGa projects. Kawazu had created a concept for Scarlet Grace some time before, but no-one in the company was willing to develop the game with him. At the same time, Square Enix staff member Yoshimitsu Inagaki noted the surge of casual mobile titles and felt challenged about what kind of game he should make next. With this in mind and following the completion of another project, Inagaki decided to revive the SaGa series, which he had worked on during production of the PS2 games. Inagaki approached Kawazu, and the two agreed to create a new SaGa game. The game was co-developed by Square Enix Business Division 3—the division then in charge of the SaGa series—and Studio Reel. Further development assistance was offered by Opus.

The game's director was Studio Reel's Masahiro Kataoka, a former Square Enix employee who worked on the Final Fantasy and Dragon Quest series. The producer was Square Enix's Masanori Ichikawa, a self-professed fan of the SaGa series. Production began mid-2013, with Kawazu describing development as "turbulent". It was built using the Unity engine. Scarlet Grace was first announced in December 2014 under the title "SaGa 2015" as part of the series' 25th anniversary celebrations. Its official title was revealed at the Sony press conference at the 2015 Tokyo Game Show. Instead of releasing a game demo, Square Enix restricted the game's public pre-release appearances to trade shows. The game was released in Japan on December 15, 2016, as both a standard edition and as a limited edition, which included a soundtrack album and artbook. Unlike many PlayStation Vita titles, Scarlet Grace did not support PlayStation TV as Kawazu decided to focus on optimizing performance for Vita alone. Sony and Square Enix collaborated on special edition Vita consoles themed after Scarlet Grace.

=== Design ===
Inagaki acted as the game's lead designer, while Kawazu was both game designer and scenario writer. Prior to being joined by battle designer Ikuta Yasuhiro, Kawazu deliberately avoided creating anything but rough battle design concepts, instead focusing on other aspects of the game to Inagaki's frustration. Yasuhiro was responsible for creating most of the battle system, including the data related to what enemies would appear in encounters, which was difficult as random encounters were removed from the game entirely. Many of the mechanics related to skills, weapons and enemies were inspired by Yasuhiro's love of card and board games, and his dislike of characters starting out with unfavorable weapons and abilities. The Timeline mechanic was implemented to give players greater freedom of choice during battle, while also giving them battle and turn information in a streamlined way. Developing the Timeline mechanic was challenging for the team due to the necessity of incorporating both the player party and enemies into the system. The lack of 3D dungeon environments was due to budgetary constraints, as they would have required a sizeable dedicated team.

LP and skill names were also carried over from earlier SaGa titles, although LP was changed to remove its earlier implementation of permadeath. Kawazu had pushed to change the names of returning battle moves, but the rest of the staff opposed this. During early development, navigating the world map was just a question of selecting a town or dungeon location, but it was changed to a free roaming world map to increase players' enjoyment at exploring the world and finding new locations. It was also a reaction to player complaints about a lack of character control in Unlimited Saga. Dungeons were also cut from the game entirely, with their equivalents being player-triggered events and battles on the world map. United Attack, while similar to the Collaboration attack mechanic from earlier SaGa titles, was a new creation meant to keep battles from becoming repetitive. The balance of battles and some of their stylistic elements were influenced by the long loading times, something Kawazu accepted as part of developing for the Vita. Prior to release, based on feedback from fans and players, the team worked to improve aspects of the game including shortening load times.

Similar to the Romancing SaGa series, Scarlet Grace was set in a pure fantasy setting. The concept of a scenario and game design offering maximum freedom to players was in place from the start of production. The team incorporated an expanded version of the recurring "Free Scenario" system, allowing players to follow various scenarios through multiple characters. While the Empire which originally dominated the world of Scarlet Grace was based on the Roman Empire, the setting for each scenario was drawn from both Asia and Europe, the latter influence being similar to that of Romancing SaGa 2 and its sequel. Kawazu initially planned eight main characters, but during development four were cut. Urpina was designed to be an orthodox protagonist with a background typical of the series, with Kawazu comparing her to the character Albert from Romancing SaGa. Leonard was designed as a "straightforward" character, something Kawazu had never done before. Taria's artistic skills were added as such features were rare in RPG protagonists. Balmaint was intended as an unorthodox protagonist due to his profession as a headsman; although the theme of a villain reviving was fairly standard, it was rare for the protagonist to be prepared for the event. Each character's narrative was designed to be very different from one another, echoing the style of SaGa Frontier.

The characters were designed by Tomomi Kobayashi, who had designed characters for the series since Romancing SaGa and had last worked in that role for SaGa Frontier. Rather than a rough sketch idea she had worked from for earlier SaGa games, Kobayashi was given a detailed setting document by Kawazu prior to beginning work, with further input if she did not understand what she was supposed to do. The cast was restricted to human designs due to budgetary limitations. Due to the varied origins of characters, Kobayashi designed their clothing based on different real-world cultures. Due to the large number of male characters, she was very forceful in her illustration to convey their strength, exhausting herself due to feeling deeply connected to each character during its creation. Kobayashi's illustrations were completed in March 2016, with her then moving on to promotional artwork. While the character models for exploration and battle were rendered in 3D, the rest of the world was designed to appear 2D, with all the artwork emulating Kobayashi's concept and character art as closely as possible. While the setting generally incorporated Western elements in its characters and architecture, the world map and many other elements were inspired by traditional Japanese paintings. The differing clothing styles of characters were Kobayashi's response to Kawazu's wish for variety rather than a conscious choice related to the game's world. The team went through an extended trial and error phase before finding a style and balance they were satisfied with. The world map design was meant to emulate the pop-up artwork from picture books.

=== SaGa: Scarlet Grace – Ambitions ===
An expanded port of the game was developed for Nintendo Switch, PlayStation 4, Windows via Steam, Android and iOS. Titled SaGa: Scarlet Grace – Ambitions, the port features voice acting, expanded story content, additional characters and music. There were also several mechanical alterations, including reducing load times, increasing movement speed, screen resolution options and customisation for the game's graphics and gameplay. The port was released in Japan on August 2, 2018. Kawazu returned as designer, writer and lyricist. Original battle designer Yasuhiro Ikuta took on the role of director.

Production of Ambitions began in December 2016 following the original game's release. Porting to other platforms proved relatively easy due to use of the Unity engine. Kawazu said the success of Scarlet Grace was why he was able to create Ambitions. The new difficulty modifiers were inspired by similar systems Kawazu designed for Romancing SaGa: Minstral Song, while the multiple battle cry options were inspired by the voice actor options from the Dragon Age series. Kawazu was involved in how the voice acting was directed, as earlier SaGa titles had made little to no use of it. One of the biggest challenges was adapting the mobile version for touchscreen controls. As the team had not used the Vita's touch functions for the original, they had no frame of reference.

Up until 2018, all versions of Scarlet Grace were exclusive to Japan with no confirmed localization. Kawazu had expressed his wish to localize the title, with a Western release depending on the performance of the mobile port of Romancing SaGa 2 outside Japan. Kawazu later announced that a Western version was in development, although it was too early to give it a release window. The Western port was officially announced at the 2019 Electronic Entertainment Expo alongside an enhanced port of Romancing SaGa 3. Ambitions was released internationally on December 3, 2019. The localization was handled by 8-4, a small production house dedicated to video game localization who had previously worked on the Tales series and Nier. 8-4 began working on the game in mid-2018, with translation lasting just over a year.

While the SaGa series was known in the West for its non-linear gameplay, in Japan it was mainly popular due to Kawazu's narratives. 8-4's localization aimed to bring out the "unique mixture of drama and dry wit" in the script. Due to its relatable themes, the team could preserve what was already present rather than reinterpreting it for a Western audience. Each lead character was given a different accent and style of speaking to represent coming from different regions of the world. They also gave different mannerisms to the leads based on how they were written; Urpina's archaic speech in Japanese was interpreted into "low fantasy" touches for their dialogue, while Leonard was written with more modern dialogue and thus made a more straightforward personality. The workload was compared to four small-scale RPGs, with its greatest challenge being the non-linear design. Another major challenge was how the main campaign was presented, as it revealed story details in a fairly cryptic manner through NPC conversation and minstrel ballads found through the world. Urpina's story arc was described as the hardest to translate due to the variety of ways she can change. In contrast, the side quests were easy to localize as they were self-contained and well explained.

=== Music ===
The music for Scarlet Grace was composed by Kenji Ito, who first co-composed the music for Final Fantasy Legend II and was sole composer for the Romancing SaGa games and SaGa Frontier. Arrangements were done by Ito, Yoshitaka Hirota, Noriyuki Kamikura and Tsutomu Narita. Orchestral arrangements were done by Kousuke Yamashita and Natsumi Kameoka. Ito produced the soundtrack, while Hidenori Iwasaki was music director. Several tracks were performed live by the Kanagawa Philharmonic Orchestra.

Kawazu wanted the soundtrack to be different from earlier entries in the SaGa series. Ito found finalizing the game's musical image a challenge during the early stages of production. Several themes needed to be rewritten as Kawazu was dissatisfied with them. Each of the main character themes were written to reflect both their personalities and their stories. Music production had not begun in 2015, with Ito still waiting for materials from Kawazu. In total, Ito composed over forty tracks for Scarlet Grace, working in parallel with his contributions to the browser game Imperial SaGa.

The theme song, "Mune ni Kizande", (Note: (胸に刻んで; lit. "Engraved On Our Hearts")) was performed by Japanese soprano Ayano Nonomura. Kawazu wanted a Classical-style main theme performed with a live orchestra. Kawazu also wanted music that sounded "feminine", focusing on strings rather than brass instruments. The original theme song melody was different prior to Nonomura's involvement, but after the first demo Ito rewrote the song as the original version was wrong for Nonomura's voice. The lyrics were written by Final Fantasy XI scenario writer Yeako Sato, then fine-tuned by Kataoka, who had previously written music lyrics for Final Fantasy Crystal Chronicles. Additional contributions to the lyrics were made by Kawazu.

Ito returned to provide new music for Ambitions. While he did not create many new tracks, Ito worked at it as if he were composing for a new game. He was also very eager to create a new theme song which would play during an opening segment so all players could hear it. As the original game's music and the main visuals involving the Firebringer were present, Ito's new tracks expanded on the Fire Bringer's character theme. The new theme song for the opening movie was titled "Kudaka Reshi Hoshi". (Note: (砕かれし星; lit. "Crushed Star")) It was performed by Nonomura, with lyrics by Kawazu.

The themes "Scarlet Spider" and "Mune ni Kizande" were first performed at a concert celebrating the series' 25th anniversary. Nonomura's performance of "Mune ni Kizande" was her first time performing video game music live on stage. A two-disc soundtrack album was released in Japan on December 21, 2017.

== Reception ==
Reception

Aggregate score
Aggregator	Score
Metacritic	NS: 79/100; PS4: 76/100

Review scores
Publication	Score
Famitsu	32/40
Game Informer	7.75/10
Nintendo World Report	8.5/10
RPGFan	85%
TouchArcade	5/5
RPG Site	10/10

On its release, Scarlet Grace reached fourth place in Media Create's gaming charts, selling nearly 65,000 units; while low, it was noted as being a solid performance for the game. The following week, the game had dropped to fourteenth place with further sales of over 14,000 units, bringing total sales to nearly 80,000. By late January the following year, the game had sold nearly 94,000 units. The Ambitions port debuted in Japan with sales approaching 20,000 units combined for PS4 and Switch.

The Western PS4 release was positively reviewed, receiving a score of 76 points out of 100 based on eleven reviews for PS4 on review aggregator Metacritic. The Switch version received a score of 79 out of 100 based on five reviews on Metacritic. Websites TouchArcade and RPG Site both gave the game perfect scores.

Japanese gaming magazine Famitsu cited the characters and open-ended scenario structure as points of praise for the title. Game Informer's Kimberley Wallace was unimpressed by the narrative, finding the characters boring and the story lacking. David Lloyd of Nintendo World Report called the story "engaging and captivating" and praised the strength of the character interactions. TouchArcade's Shaun Musgrave found the stories serviceable if not original, but gave high praise to the localization. Alana Hagues, writing for RPGFan, found the story derivative and stated that it gave her little reason to carry on playing.

Lloyd enjoyed the music at first, but due to its repetition found it grew stale during his playtime. Hagues liked the character designs and praised the localization for holding up the weak narratives, but criticized the presentation for asset recycling. Wallace found the graphics subpar, but praised the storybook aesthetic. James Galizio of RPG Site called the music "consistently fantastic", but had mixed feelings about the visuals, due to their unconventional style. In their review of the Ambitions port, Famitsu noted the original's long loading times as an issue the new version addressed.

Famitsu enjoyed the gameplay, positively comparing it to earlier SaGa titles. In their Ambitions review, they praised the additions as promoting ease of play compared to the original, despite lacking clear tutorials. Lloyd was very positive about the battle system and its flexibility, but thought there was too little exploration for some players due to the overworld structure. Wallace gave much of her praise to the gameplay, but noted a lack of balance and unfair bosses. Musgrave said that he "could gush about the mechanics all day", saying that the game had managed to learn lessons from the release of Unlimited Saga. Hagues found the title to be far more inviting than earlier entries in the SaGa series, despite some difficulty spikes and the unconventional structure. Galizio was likewise highly positive, praising both the battle system and its additional systems and overworld design.
