= Unlimited Saga =

2002 role-playing video game

- North American cover art
- Developer: Square
- Publishers: JP: Square; NA: Square Enix; EU: Atari Europe
- Director: Akitoshi Kawazu
- Producer: Akitoshi Kawazu
- Designer: Kyouji Koizumi
- Programmer: Takaaki Tonooka
- Artists: Yusuke Naora; Tomomi Kobayashi
- Writer: Jyunichi Shinomiya
- Composer: Masashi Hamauzu
- Series: SaGa
- Platform: PlayStation 2
- Release: JP: December 19, 2002; NA: June 17, 2003; EU: November 7, 2003
- Genre: Role-playing
- Mode: Single-player

Unlimited Saga (Note: Anrimiteddo: Saga (Japanese: アンリミテッド:サガ)) is a 2002 role-playing video game developed and published by Square (rebranded as Square Enix in 2003) for the PlayStation 2 as the ninth game in the SaGa series. It was released in 2002 in Japan and 2003 in North America and Europe; its European version was published by Atari Europe. The story follows seven characters as they explore mysteries connected to the Seven Wonders, artifacts left by an ancient civilization said to be capable of triggering a golden age. Battles carry over the skill-based levelling systems and nonlinear structure of earlier SaGa titles, with an exploration structure similar to a board game.

Production at Square's Product Development Division 2 lasted two years, involving a staff of fifty people. Several staff members returned from earlier entries including series creator Akitoshi Kawazu as producer and director, designer Kyouji Koizumi, and composer Masashi Hamauzu. The characters were designed by newcomer Yusuke Naora, with veteran artist Tomomi Kobayashi contributing promotional art. Kawazu wanted to get back to the basics of game design and evoke the style of the earliest SaGa games, placing focus on the battle system and having several elements mimic tabletop role-playing games. The graphics were designed in partnership with Adobe Systems to create a combination of 3D models and 2D artwork.

Unlimited Saga was first announced in 2002, and was supplemented with several guidebooks that detailed its systems and explored the game world's lore. It sold over half a million units in Japan and a further 130,000 in the West. It saw a polarized response between Japan, where it was met with praise, and the West. In English reviews, the music was met with general praise, while its graphics and unorthodox gameplay saw mixed to negative reactions. Feedback from the title influenced the production of both Romancing SaGa: Minstrel Song and SaGa: Scarlet Grace.

== Gameplay ==
The gameplay in Unlimited Saga is split into two distinct parts; exploration in the style of a board game (above), and combat encounters carrying over gameplay elements of the Saga series (below).

Unlimited Saga is a role-playing video game where players take on the role of seven different protagonists, playing through the narratives in a nonlinear style. Gameplay is split between two modes; town exploration that includes story sections and interacting with facilities, and exploring environments while encountering enemies and environmental hazards. Town facilities are represented with icons on an illustrated background, with selecting an icon opening the facility and potentially triggering a story section delivered in a comic book style. During the game, players will explore towns which can be used to gather information and purchase goods to aid them on their journey before exploring outside environments and dungeons. Specific services in towns include the Blacksmith, which sells and forges weapons and accessories. A scenario-specific Carrier's Guild has a ranking system, raised by performing delivery missions. The party can either save at a town, or perform a quick save while exploring. Upon exiting town, the party is either transported to the area of a quest, or can select previously explored areas on a world map.

Dungeon and environmental exploration plays out in a style similar to a board game; the player character is represented as a static sprite on a map that is revealed as the player explores, with unexplored areas being named with a series of question marks. Each move or action being equivalent to a turn. While exploring, an illustration in the top right hand corner of the screen shows the environment the party is in. The goal of missions in these areas is to reach a goal, either a story event, another town, or some other location within the map. The amount of turns taken by the player is recorded. Some missions have turn limits, with the player being returned to a town if they reach that limit. Moving into a new part of the map can trigger an event such as a battle or trap, or hold an item the party can search for and retrieve. While unlocking chests or avoiding traps, the player triggers the Reel, an options wheel that spins until the player halts it, triggering an action. Enemies shift position with each turn, and some spaces have hiding areas allowing the party to avoid battle if they choose.

When a battle is triggered, the party is unable to flee, either having to defeat the enemy or be defeated in battle. During battles, a player party of up to five on-screen characters fight enemies in a themed arena. The player is given five turns per round, with actions selected for up to that many characters per turn. Characters have two types of health: Health Points (HP), which is used for skills and special abilities, and Life Points (LP), which is their underlying health and is lowered if their HP bar drops to zero. If the scenario protagonist runs out of LP, the game ends and must be restarted from the last save. Both HP and LP are fully recovered when the party reaches a town, and can be recovered to varying degrees outside battle by resting for a turn. While HP level can rise, each character's LP level is set from the game's beginning. As in exploration, the Reel system plays a part, with the player's chosen icon on the Reel impacting the type and power of a character's move. The player can choose to have five individual actions, or "Hold" the action so they are chained together to create combination attacks. Combination attacks can be triggered by a single character using multiple skills or attacks in one turn, or multiple characters chaining their attacks together. An attack chain can be broken by enemies if their attack phase comes in the middle of the party's turn.

While characters do not earn experience points in battle, completing missions can increase a character's maximum HP, weapons have unique abilities, and skills are unlocked by equipping different types of items to a character's growth tree at the end of a mission. New weapon techniques can also be learned during battle at random. Weapons have a limited durability, and after a set number of uses will break and become unusable. Durability can be raised by using certain items, or reworking the weapon at the Blacksmith. Magical abilities called Arts are learned by characters with tablet items. If an Art is used in battle, players will be invited to invest points into raising the power of that Art, unlocking an Art's use with a weapon. Withdrawing points from the Art will cause the character to lose their higher abilities. Some character types can use spirits called Familiars, which are element-themed spirits equipped to characters who can perform specific skills.

== Synopsis ==
Unlimited Saga takes place in an unnamed fantasy world. Scattered across the world are the Seven Wonders, giant structures from a time called the "Golden Age" linked to an ancient battle against chaotic forces. Key to the world's backstory is Iskander, a warrior king who conquered half the known world and founded a capital bearing his name near one of the Seven Wonders. In the game's backstory, the Seven Wonders were created as research devices by the Arcanians, a race created as the original humanity by the world's Creator. Their experiments in the Seven Wonders were with Chaos, a dangerous energy force. Chaos's influence prompted the Creator to destroy the Arcanian's civilization, banishing Chaos and causing the Creator to vanish. In the present, the Seven Wonders are attributed the power to bestow a new Golden Age.

The storylines follow seven different characters—Laura, Judy, Ventus, Ruby, Mythe, Kurt and Armic—who each face a person using the power of the Seven Wonders. Laura is a former pirate who after the death of her husband finds new meaning protecting a wandering prince. Judy is a young witch-in-training who goes on a quest to save her grandfather after he is trapped in a mirror by an old rival. Ventus is a courier looking for the man who killed his brother years before. Ruby is the powerless sister of a fortune teller who ends up caught in her affairs. Mythe is a lady's man who becomes smitten with the picture of a mysterious woman. Kurt is a former noble knight who defies his family to find adventure and discover the truth behind a curse gauntlet he wears. Armic is a laid-back, slow-witted member of the Chapa people sent to find the items necessary for a rain-making ritual as his people are suffering from a prolonged drought.

In Ruby's scenario, the party includes the now-immortal Iskander, who became an omnipotent being through learning the Creator's secrets from Arcanian survivors. A key event in the game is the Festival, a celebration in memory of Iskander and his immediate successors Lord Dixon and his wife Regina. All the characters come together and can interact during this period. Each scenario reveals the antagonists to have been tempted, directly manipulated by, or be intent on using the manifested Chaos, which the chosen protagonist defeats and banishes once again.

== Development ==
Unlimited Saga was developed by Square, which handled development for multiple role-playing series including SaGa and Final Fantasy. Development lasted two years, and involved a staff of around fifty people from Square's Product Development Division 2. Many of the staff were veterans of the SaGa series. Series creator Akitoshi Kawazu produced and directed, Kyouji Koizumi returned as battle designer from the Romancing SaGa games, and recurring staff member Jyunichi Shinomiya acted as lead writer. As with other games in the series, Kawazu chose a non-traditional way of designing the game. He stated, "As far as Unlimited Saga is concerned, we said let's tackle the basics of game design once again. We didn't try to emphasize the realistic details, but rather symbolize, and cut out the parts we didn't need. We thought, let's dare to do a 'not express' thing and we calmly [stuck] to that route." Despite the non-traditional approach, the team built on their previous game development structures when creating Unlimited Saga. During its early production, it was planned for an unnamed handheld console. When production of that console was cancelled, production was moved to the PlayStation 2. Unlimited Saga saw the series' debut on that platform.

The game's art director was Yusuke Naora, who had just finished work on Final Fantasy X. After completing his work there, Naora was considering leaving Square and going overseas to study art to keep up with other artists coming into the industry, but was unable to for unspecified reasons. At this point, Kawazu invited Naora onto the production team. Naora accepted, as he "wanted to try new things" within the SaGa series. The character designs were created by Naora, with additional character and monster artwork by Yuichi Shiota and Toshiaki Matsumoto. Naora was originally only assigned as background designer, but Kawazu wanted a "challenging" design for the characters, so requested Naora to design them. Regular series artist Tomomi Kobayashi created character art for the game based on Naora's design. While working from another artist's work, Kobayashi put her own spin on the designs, creating the illustrations around the primary color of each character. The visual theme for the cast was "flowers", with each character being given a key colour based on a flower.

For the graphics, Square partnered with Adobe Systems to create "Sketch Motion" during battles. Using programs such as Photoshop and After Effects, hand-drawn 2D designs were combined with 3D models to create a unique hybrid look. The style of the opening movie, which featured the lead characters depicted using cel-shaded graphics like a "moving watercolor", was suggested by Naora. The CGI opening, a first for the SaGa series, was animated by Square's dedicated studio Visual Works. The animation lead was Takeshi Nozue, who would later work on several notable Visual Works projects including Final Fantasy VII: Advent Children. The use of Adobe tools managed to cut down on production time for the visuals and opening, as the layers and effect filters made previously labour-intensive aspects of animation easy.

When designing Unlimited Saga, Kawazu wanted to go back to the mechanical roots of the early portable titles, deciding to create a game that focused almost entirely on its battle system. The "Reel" system was based on rolling a dice in a tabletop role-playing game. The board game-like gameplay and progression was intended by Kawazu as an evolution of his work on Wild Card, a role-playing game for the WonderSwan. The decision made Unlimited Saga stand out from the rest of the SaGa franchise, which were traditional role-playing games. While there were internal worries about the gameplay's unconventional tone and abstruse nature, Kawazu used his seniority within Square to produce the project. The basic narrative structure of seven major threats facing the world was created by Kawazu early in production, with the finer details being included later. Iskandar was to have been an eighth main character, confronting all the threats and joining the narrative together, but Kawazu scrapped the eighth narrative and incorporated existing concepts into Ruby's narrative. Kawazu thought up Ventus's narrative after seeing the narrative and gameplay concepts for The Bouncer.

=== Music ===
The music was composed by Masashi Hamauzu, while synthesizer programming was done by Ryo Yamazaki. The two previously collaborated on the soundtrack for SaGa Frontier 2 after the departure of previous series composer Kenji Ito. Because the game uses streaming audio, it was possible for the sound team to use real acoustic instrument sounds in place of a synthesizer. Three pieces, including "March in C", were written for full orchestra. Live recording of ensembles of tracks such as "Feel Uneasy About the Wonders" and "Battle Theme IV" pitted solo instruments against one another to create what Hamauzu considered a Latin sound. The ending vocal piece "Soaring Wings" was written specifically for singer Mio Kashiwabara. Unlimited Saga features five-channel surround sound support from Dolby's Pro Logic II. The game's soundtrack consists of 58 songs spanning two discs. It was released on January 22, 2003. Due to fan demand, the album went through two reprints.

== Release ==
Unlimited SaGa was announced by Square in July 2002. The game was one of five selected to form part of a promotional lottery campaign by Sony, where two random players of each title would go on journeys to areas of the world similar to settings in the games. For Unlimited Saga, the reward would have been a trip to Rome due to the shared presence of ancient city ruins. Due to tensions between the United States and Iraq at the time and the consequent risks of a terrorist attack, the campaign was cancelled. It was a prominent and popular addition to the 2002 Tokyo Game Show. The game released in Japan on December 19, 2002, by Square. It launched in a standard edition and a Limited Edition with unique artwork, which included a special booklet about the game's world and a soundtrack CD. Shortly after the game's release, Square finalized its merger with Enix to become Square Enix.

Unlimited SaGa was Square Enix's first release in South Korea, published on June 19, 2003, by the local branch of Electronic Arts. The game was fully localized with native text and voice acting. The ending theme "Soaring Wings" was also localized under the name "Nalgae", performed by Yonshin Pak. The new song was supervised by Hamauzu and Yamazaki. Hamauzu did not have Pak imitate or emulate the original song, but worked with her to adapt it into Korean, changing its tone and allowing her to sing at a comfortable pitch. Recording for "Nalgae" took place in April 2003.

A Western release was announced in February 2003. The game was among those shown by Square Enix at the 2003 Electronic Entertainment Expo, alongside a number of other titles including Final Fantasy XI, Final Fantasy Crystal Chronicles, and Drakengard. In North America, the game was published on June 17, 2003. To promote Unlimited Saga in North America, Square Enix held the "Hall of Valor" contest beginning on the game's release date and ending on July 27. It consisted of three challenges where players would have to send in answers to difficult questions related to the game. Prizes included products by electronics manufacturer Denon. The European version was released on November 7, 2003, by Atari Europe. Unlimited Saga Collector's Edition was released in Europe and included a bonus DVD titled Eternal Calm Final Fantasy X-2: Prologue. The English dub was recorded by A.D. Vision. Actress Tiffany Grant, who voiced one of the protagonists, said it was unusual for video games to be voiced in the Houston area where A.D. Vision was based, and it only happened because Square Enix hired A.D. Vision for the dubbing. The dub was directed by Kawazu and Kyle C. Jones.

=== Related media ===
A number of books were published by DigiCube. Unlimited Saga Material Collection: Lead to the Destiny, an artbook containing illustrations from Kobayashi, was released on December 12 prior to the game's release. Unlimited Saga: The First Guide Book for Beginners released parallel to the game, covering the opening of each scenario. Unlimited Saga: Visual Arts Collection released on February 14, 2003, containing reproduced in-game artwork and designs. A full guidebook containing gameplay tips and staff interviews, Unlimited: Saga - Book of Disassembly, was released by Studio BentStuff on March 28. It was a highly extensive book, and included additional backstory and a novella written by Benny Matsumaya. Its comprehensiveness was due to fan feedback in Japan about the abstruse elements of the game and its world.

A two-volume comic anthology based on the game was published by Enterbrain's Bros Comics between April and March 2003. Also during 2003, a two-volume novelization written by Sunami Shinozaki was released through the Famitsu Bunko imprint: Blue Lazuria in April and Erose of the Red in May. A set of postcards and posters was released by Square via DigiCube's distribution service. Unlimited Saga was originally connected to the setting of the anime series Final Fantasy: Unlimited, but these plans were shelved during production. Kawazu later said that many of the similarities were coincidental due to his work on both projects.

== Reception ==
Reception

Aggregate score
Aggregator	Score
Metacritic	45/100

Review scores
Publication	Score
1Up.com	D
Electronic Gaming Monthly	2/4/4
Famitsu	31/40
GamePro	2.5/5
GameSpot	4.3/10
GameSpy	1/5
IGN	6.6/10
PlayStation Official Magazine – UK	7/10
GMR	3/10

Unlimited Saga entered the Japanese sales charts at number 3 behind Pokémon Ruby and Sapphire, selling 196,471 copies, and ended the year with over 270,000 copies sold in Japan. By the end of Square Enix's fiscal year in May 2003, the game had sold 560,000 copies in Japan. This made it the second best-selling title from their 2002 library behind Final Fantasy X-2. For selling over half a million copies, Sony Computer Entertainment awarded the game a Gold Award during the 9th Annual PlayStation Awards on June 29, 2003. In the West, the game sold a further 100,000 units in North America, and 30,000 in Europe.

The game has seen a polarised response in Japan and the West; while Japanese press gave it high scores and praise, many Western critics gave it middling to low scores compared to earlier SaGa titles. Review aggregate website Metacritic showed a negative reaction from Western reviewers. The battle system saw opinions ranging from mixed at its implementation, to frustrated with its complex nature. Several critics noted the game's experimental nature. The graphics also met with a mixed response due to their implementation, though several lauded their quality. By contrast, the soundtrack and visuals met with general acclaim.

Famitsu lauded the title for its new mechanics, which challenged the role-playing player base, and awarded it the publication's Silver Award. 1Up.com felt the game was too unforgiving for beginners due to a lack of in-game tutorials and steep learning curve. Electronic Gaming Monthly was very negative, with the three reviewers all faulting the gameplay, with one citing it as unfair for players. GamePro disliked both its non-linear structure and control scheme, which made exploration harder for the reviewer. Brad Shoemaker of GameSpot summed up the game as "the flawed sum of its disparate parts", citing a lack of cohesion and polish in its gameplay and presentation, and finding the story lacking.

Christian Nutt of GameSpy was extremely negative about the game, calling it one of the worst RPGs he had played in many years, faulting almost every element of the title. IGN's Jeremy Dunham said that the title was not for everybody due to its gameplay experimentation. Martin Kitts of PlayStation Official Magazine – UK was more forgiving of the game as he felt it was aimed at an audience who enjoyed a challenging experience, but still felt it was too abstruse and difficult for casual gamers, saying it would have worked better on the original PlayStation. Nich Maragos, writing for GMR, felt that the game had promise, but was undermined by poor execution on several of its mechanics and concepts.

Prior to its release, Unlimited Saga was recognized by the Computer Entertainment Supplier's Association in its Game Awards Future category at the organization's annual event. RPGamer called Unlimited Saga the "biggest letdown" of 2003 in their annual RPGamer Awards. GamesRadar called it the 25th Worst Game Of All Time. In 2012, 1Up.com would include Unlimited Saga on its list of "Underwhelming RPGs with Overwhelming Soundtracks", with writer Bob Mackey calling it "a shame" that the music was likely neglected due to the game's divisive mechanics. In a 2015 article on the SaGa series for USGamer, Jeremy Parish cited Unlimited Saga as the game where Kawazu took his board game influences and unconventional style to an extreme.

== Legacy ==
Speaking about the game's mixed reaction in the West, Kawazu attributed it to expectations for a more traditional role-playing experience. The mixed reactions and internal wishes from staff would also lead to Kawazu developing Romancing SaGa: Minstrel Song, a remake of Romancing SaGa for the PS2, with Naora returning to redesign the cast for the remake. Due to Kawazu's commitments to other projects within the company including the Final Fantasy Crystal Chronicles subseries, Unlimited Saga was the last original SaGa title for twelve years. That next title, SaGa: Scarlet Grace, was partially built by Kawazu using feedback from Unlimited Saga. Following the remastered release of SaGa Frontier, Kawazu stated that a remaster of Unlimited Saga was being considered.
