= Akitoshi Kawazu =

Japanese video game producer and designer (born 1963)

- 河津 秋敏
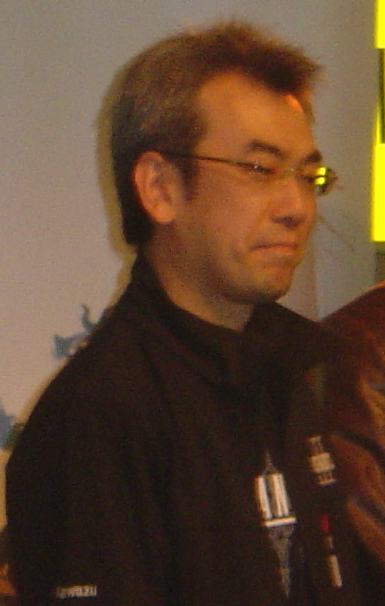
- Kawazu in 2007
- Born: November 5, 1962 (age 64); Aso District, Kumamoto, Japan
- Education: Tokyo Institute of Technology
- Occupation: Video game designer
- Years active: 1986–present
- Employer: Square Enix
- Known for: SaGa series; Final Fantasy series; The Last Remnant

Akitoshi Kawazu (河津 秋敏, Kawazu Akitoshi; born November 5, 1962) is a Japanese game designer, director, producer and writer. After joining Square (later Square Enix) in 1986, he went on to become a central developer for the first two Final Fantasy titles, then acted as creator and lead developer for the SaGa series.

Interested in games since his high school days, his first project at Square was a graphic designer for Rad Racer; he then acted as battle designer for Final Fantasy and Final Fantasy II. He has since worked on nearly every SaGa title, in addition to creating the Final Fantasy Crystal Chronicles subseries, smaller projects including The Last Remnant, and serving in an executive role on many Square Enix projects.

Kawazu was inspired by role-playing titles such as Dungeons & Dragons, Wizardry and Dragon Quest, with a preference for sword and sorcery settings in his scenarios. A characteristic of his games is a non-linear design for storylines and exploration, and systems that are not actively explained to players. He also has a deep involvement in each project beyond his credited roles, and tries something new with each game he develops.

== Biography ==
=== Early life ===
Kawazu was born on November 5, 1962, in Oguni, a town in Aso District, Kumamoto Prefecture. Talking about his early life in Oguni, Kawazu said that he was a "rowdy" type who wanted to be in the limelight and did not hesitate to voice his opinion to adults. He studied and graduated from Kumamoto Prefectural High School, then later studied at the Science School of the Tokyo Institute of Technology. During high school and college, he was deeply interested in games; he first became a dedicated player of Space Invaders, then later developed a love of tabletop role-playing and tabletop strategy games. He was originally scheduled to enter a job with Sony from the Science School, but due to unspecified circumstances in his private life he was forced to drop out.

His first game-related job was as a part-time journalist for Beep, a general gaming magazine published by SoftBank, at the invitation of a school friend. He started out writing product reviews, and during his time with the magazine he gained exposure to games and the video games industry. While he had never heard of the company Square, he became interested in working for them upon seeing an advertisement for Suishō no Dragon, featuring artwork by the game's illustrator Gen Sato. Despite his lack of video game development experience, he applied for a job there. Originally he was told the deadline for applicants had passed, but he was asked in for an interview anyway. He was interviewed first by Hiromichi Tanaka, then by Hironobu Sakaguchi, and Kawazu was taken on as a part-time employee in 1986.

=== Career ===
Kawazu's first job at Square (later Square Enix) was as a graphic designer for Rad Racer. Following that, he was asked by Sakaguchi to work on the company's new role-playing game (RPG) project Final Fantasy, begun by Sakaguchi after the genre was proven as commercial viable by Enix's Dragon Quest. At the time, Kawazu had no idea how popular the title would become; his role was designing the battle system. He returned as battle designer for its sequel Final Fantasy II. As part of a drive to create something different from the original, he created a notorious system of use-based statistic gains. In the wake of internal discussions and a lack of outside understanding of Kawazu's systems for Final Fantasy II, future titles beginning with Final Fantasy III went back to the basic systems of the first game.

Following the success of Tetris for the Game Boy, Square president Masafumi Miyamoto wanted to make their own version of it for the console, but the staff instead designed an RPG, the first for the platform; Kawazu acted as director and designer. The game was Makai Toushi SaGa, released in the West as The Final Fantasy Legend. It proved hugely popular and was Square's first title to sell a million copies. Kawazu subsequently worked on Final Fantasy Legend II, then upon request from Nintendo started production on Romancing SaGa for the Super Famicom; another production team in Osaka designed a third Game Boy title without his involvement. He would continue working on SaGa titles for the Super Famicom, and multiple PlayStation titles for the next several years. After the troubled production of Legend of Mana, where he took on a supervisory role in keeping the project from cancellation, Kawazu decided that his main talent lay as a producer overseeing projects.

Following SaGa Frontier 2 in 1999, Kawazu's team were originally employed on a numbered Final Fantasy project. When production was halted due to internal issues surrounding PlayOnline, Kawazu's team switched to supporting production for The Bouncer and developing multiple WonderSwan Color titles including original titles and ports. The 2002 SaGa title Unlimited Saga was designed based solely around Kawazu's tastes, using his position within the company to get his way. The title was divisive, and was the last original SaGa title until the release of SaGa: Scarlet Grace in 2016. He also created the concept for the anime series Final Fantasy: Unlimited during this period, which originally had a narrative link to Unlimited Saga.

From 2004 to 2007, Kawazu served as one of Square Enix's board of directors alongside Yoichi Wada and Yosuke Matsuda. He was the only game developer among them, and returned to development following his resignation from the board. During this time, Kawazu acted as executive producer for both the Ivalice Alliance, a series of titles set within the fictional world of Ivalice; and Final Fantasy Crystal Chronicles, a subseries he created through the partially owned shell company The Game Developer Studio, acting as producer for the first game and executive producer for subsequent entries. For the fifth entry The Crystal Bearers, he acted as a producer and writer. In 2005 he took over as executive producer of Final Fantasy XII after Yasumi Matsuno withdrew. He played a key creative role in The Last Remnant, a standalone RPG designed by veterans of the SaGa series. He also acted as concept creator for It's New Frontier, a life simulator for mobile devices which ran from 2009 to the close of Square Enix's old mobile services in 2018. He currently works as general producer for the SaGa series, serving in an executive role on projects including the mobile spin-offs Imperial SaGa (2015) and Romancing SaGa Re;univerSe (2018).

== Design philosophy and influences ==
Kawazu is noted in his game design for using mechanics seen as unconventional in the RPG genre, such as usage-based ability leveling, non-linear storytelling, and open worlds or similar freely-explorable environments. Speaking specifically about the SaGa series, Kawazu described his philosophy for it as always trying something new with each entry and pushing at the perceived limitations of RPGs. His games are also noted for obscured mechanics and higher-than-average difficulty, something Kawazu ascribes to his love of challenging gameplay. His design sensibilities and game tastes were influenced by titles such as the Dungeons & Dragons tabletop game, the video games Wizardry and Dragon Quest, and the wargames of Avalon Hill. Unlimited Saga was his most literal expression of this, with mechanics and presentation directly emulating tabletop games. Its divisive reception caused Kawazu to create more conventional titles in the future, though they continued to use his gameplay philosophies.

Throughout his career, regardless of the reception, Kawazu has striven for originality in his game design, drawing from unconventional sources compared to other video games. He played with Western tabletop games in his youth, and also manually translated them as they were frequently in English rather than Japanese. His favourite video game is Ultima IV: Quest of the Avatar. For the visual and narrative style of his games, he drew influence from the sword and sorcery subgenre of fantasy, which he greatly enjoyed in his youth. The SaGa series has consciously moved away from the typical storylines of other series such as Final Fantasy. When working on games, Kawazu often has duties and input beyond his credited role; an instance of this was SaGa Frontier II, where he was credited as producer and co-writer but ended up writing almost all the scenarios himself, but he ensures staff were given proper credit.

== Works ==
credits
Year	Title	Role(s)	Ref.
1987	Rad Racer	Graphic designer	
1987	Final Fantasy	Game designer	
1988	Final Fantasy II	Game designer	
1989	The Final Fantasy Legend	Director, game designer, scenario	
1990	Final Fantasy Legend II	Director, scenario	
1992	Romancing SaGa	Director, game designer, scenario	
1993	Romancing SaGa 2	Director, game designer, scenario	
1995	Romancing SaGa 3	Director, game designer, scenario	
1997	SaGa Frontier	Director, producer, scenario	
1999	SaGa Frontier 2	Producer, scenario	
1999	Legend of Mana	Producer	
1999	Racing Lagoon	Producer	
2000	Hataraku Chocobo	Producer	
2000	The Bouncer	Dramatization	
2001	Wild Card	Game designer	
2001	Blue Wing Blitz	Producer	
2002	Unlimited Saga	Director, producer	
2003	Final Fantasy Crystal Chronicles	Producer	
2005	Code Age Commanders	Executive producer	
2006	Final Fantasy XII	Executive producer	
2006	Dawn of Mana	Supervisor	
2007	Final Fantasy XII: Revenant Wings	Executive producer	
2007	Final Fantasy Crystal Chronicles: Ring of Fates	Executive producer, executive director	
2007	Final Fantasy Tactics: The War of the Lions	Executive producer	
2007	Final Fantasy Tactics A2: Grimoire of the Rift	Executive producer	
2008	Final Fantasy Crystal Chronicles: My Life as a King	Executive producer	
2008	The Last Remnant	Executive producer, scenario	
2009	Final Fantasy Crystal Chronicles: Echoes of Time	Executive producer	
2009	Final Fantasy Crystal Chronicles: My Life as a Darklord	Executive producer	
2009	SaGa 2: Goddess of Destiny	Executive producer	
2009	Final Fantasy Crystal Chronicles: The Crystal Bearers	Executive producer, scenario	
2009	It's New Frontier	Concept design	
2012	Emperors SaGa	Supervisor, scenario	
2015	Imperial SaGa	Executive producer	
2016	SaGa: Scarlet Grace	Writer, co-designer	
2018	Romancing SaGa Re;univerSe	Executive producer, concept	
2019	Imperial SaGa Eclipse	Executive producer	
2024	SaGa: Emerald Beyond	Director, lead writer	
