= Tiberius Claudius Asellus (praetor 206 BCE) =

Ancient Roman senator

Tiberius Claudius Asellus was a tribunus militum in the army of the consul Gaius Claudius Nero in 207 BCE, praetor in 206 BCE, when he obtained Sardinia as his province, and plebeian aedile in 204 BCE.

The historian Appian relates an extraordinary adventure of this Claudius Asellus in 212 BCE.
