= Tomomi Kobayashi =

Japanese illustrator

- Occupations: Video game illustrator and character designer
- Known for: Her illustration in the SaGa series

Tomomi Kobayashi (小林智美, Kobayashi Tomomi) is a Japanese illustrator. She is best known for her character design and illustration work in the SaGa series of video games by Square Enix. Kobayashi has been termed an "iconic" artist for Japanese role-playing games, and has had multiple artbooks published.

== Biography ==
Kobayashi's game playing was limited, noting her shock at seeing how advanced the Famicom game Final Fantasy III appeared. She was approached to work on the Japanese role-playing game Romancing SaGa by a representative from Square Co. (now Square Enix) following the release of a book for her illustration collection. Development of Romancing SaGa had Kobayashi create concept art for characters before the in-game character designs were made, due to the game having stories and concepts for its characters created in advance. She was given only a profile for each character that was about two paragraphs in length and told to use her imagination. Sprite designer Kazuko Shibuya came to visit Kobayashi to look at and talk about Kobayashi's art with her before bringing it back to the team to show them. The camaraderie the two had made caused Shibuya to feel more attached to Kobayashi's work. This method of illustration differs from her work illustrating concepts for characters in novels, where she reads the text of the novel first. Kobayashi described this method as "half-terrifying and half-exhilarating." The work proved more difficult for Kobayashi than expected due to the larger volume of characters she was expected to design for the project. She approximated 5 to 6 main characters and "at most" 10 minor characters to draw for a novel, whereas the number in Romancing SaGa was "triple or quadruple" that, with the sequel Romancing SaGa 2 having even more characters for her to design. When designing for Romancing SaGa 2, Kobayashi aimed to change things with her approach, but felt that the outcome was largely the same. For Romancing SaGa 3, she designed the characters to come from different parts of the world based on the characters' names rather than any design description.

Kobayashi has done work to promote the SaGa series, such as during an event celebrating the series' 25th anniversary in the Saga Prefecture where her designs were on display in an art gallery. These designs were featured on porcelain plates (a process called "Arita-yaki") among other things, which were either used as presentation for the event or sold. Multiple artbooks of her art have been published, including both for the SaGa series, and for her own personal art.

== Artistic style and philosophy ==
When designing a character, Kobayashi tries to keep her design "preferences" at the root of the character design, but not let it get in the way of trying new ideas or work against the character design, even if she doesn't typically work in that style. When working on different games in the SaGa series, she has tried to change up details and the "feel" of the illustrations in order to keep a difference between games.

== Legacy ==
She has been regarded as an iconic video game artist by multiple sources, including Shack News and Hobby Consolas.

== Works ==
- Romancing SaGa (1992)
- Romancing SaGa 2 (1993)
- Romancing SaGa 3 (1995)
- SaGa Frontier (1997)
- SaGa Frontier 2 (1999)
- Aquarian Age TCG (2000)
- Unlimited SaGa (2002)
- Romancing SaGa: Minstrel Song (2005)
- Granado Espada (2006)
- Sangokushi Taisen DS
- Eternal Wheel (2008)
- Sonic Unleashed (2008)
- Disgaea 4 (2011) (Story Opening Valvatorez Portrait)
- Dimension Zero
- Shin Megami Tensei IV (2013)
- Imperial SaGa (2015)
- Legend of Legacy (2015)
- SaGa: Scarlet Grace (2016)
