= SaGa Frontier =

1997 video game

- North American cover art depicting the character Blue
- Developer: Square Product Development Division 2
- Publishers: JP: Square; NA: Sony Computer Entertainment; WW: Square Enix (Remaster)
- Director: Akitoshi Kawazu
- Producer: Akitoshi Kawazu
- Designer: Kyoji Koizumi
- Programmer: Takaaki Tonooka
- Artists: Kouji Tsuda; Tomomi Kobayashi
- Writers: Miwa Shoda; Akitoshi Kawazu
- Composer: Kenji Ito
- Series: SaGa
- Platforms: PlayStation; Android; iOS; Nintendo Switch; PlayStation 4; Windows
- Release: PlayStation: JP: July 11, 1997; NA: March 24, 1998; Android, iOS, Switch, PS4, Windows: WW: April 15, 2021
- Genre: Role-playing
- Mode: Single-player

SaGa Frontier (Note: Japanese: サガ フロンティア) is a 1997 role-playing video game developed by Square for the PlayStation. It is the seventh game in the SaGa series, and the first to be released on the PlayStation. It is also the first in the series to be released under the SaGa brand outside Japan; previous overseas releases had used the Final Fantasy brand instead. A remastered version featuring additional characters, events and features was released on April 15, 2021, for Android, iOS, Nintendo Switch, PlayStation 4 and Windows.

SaGa Frontier was developed by Square Production Team 2 with Akitoshi Kawazu as director and producer, Koichi Ishii as planning chief, Kenji Ito as composer, and Tomomi Kobayashi as illustrator. Square Production Team 2 included Kyoji Koizumi, Miwa Shoda, Kazuko Shibuya, and Minoru Akao. The musical score for SaGa Frontier was composed and arranged by Kenji Ito, who provided music for many previous entries in the SaGa franchise. When development began, the game's title was intended to be Romancing SaGa 4. The focus shifted from the traditional SaGa style and began to focus on several different characters on their own journeys. Nine stories were crafted, but one of them was dropped during early development because of it being too comedic.

SaGa Frontier takes place in a science fantasy universe called "The Regions", a group of worlds with varying degrees of culture, unique races, technology, and magic. The game allows the player to follow the exploits of one of seven protagonists. The game's "Free Scenario System" offers a large amount of non-linear gameplay, allowing the player to freely travel between many of the Regions, interact with other characters, and take part in turn-based combat. SaGa Frontier enjoyed commercial success, having sold over one million copies. The game was generally well received in Japan and has been re-released under a few best-seller labels, as well as the PlayStation Store. However, it received largely mixed and average reviews in North America, mostly due to its Free Scenario System.

== Gameplay ==
Playable characters fighting enemies while the player chooses one of battle skills (on the left)

The basic concept of SaGa Frontier is based on its Free Scenario System, in which one can play as any of seven different protagonists, all of whom exist in the same setting, a solar system known as The Regions: a group of planets, each with its own culture, game-level of technology, and form of magic. The game is considered non-linear, in that from the beginning many of the characters are free to go almost anywhere and interact with almost anyone. Travel through most of the Regions is easy due to inter-regional ships traveling regularly between them. The player controls the protagonist on the field screen, a set of interconnecting pre-rendered backgrounds, and is able to speak with a slew of other characters in order to gather information, recruit party members, and initiate quests. Each character has a storyline and a main quest to fulfill, but there are also several optional quests that any of the characters can participate in. Some of the main characters encounter each other during their quests. The storyline of each character also changes depending on who is chosen, what is said in conversation, what events have already occurred, and who is in the adventuring party, a concept first introduced in Romancing SaGa 2.

Players encounter groups of enemies on the field screen, upon which they switch to the battle screen. The battle screen depicts 2D-animated sprites amidst a 3D-rotating background. Battles are turn-based; the player chooses the characters' actions and must allow them, along with those of the enemies, to play out. A variety of weapons, special skills, and magic spells are at the player's disposal. Most skills are learned mid-battle, while many spells are purchased in the game's shops. If certain conditions are met within the battle, party members on either side can create combination attacks for added damage. Winning battles increases player character statistics such as hit points (HP), life points (LP), strength, and quickness. Outside of combat, players can equip and unequip (or "seal") weapons, armor, skills, spells, and items. First introduced in the Game Boy incarnations of the SaGa series, the game contains different races that exist within the Regions: the Humans, the Mystics, the Half-Mystics (half Human and half Mystic), Monsters, and the Mecs (robots).

The player is encouraged to complete each of the seven scenarios one after the other. For added incentive, beating a character's game and saving its completion to the system data adds some bonuses. After beating one character's game, essentially every character in the following game starts off stronger and with better gear than before, and may depend on how many battles players fought in their previous quest that they saved on the system data. Fulfilling all seven main quests allows the player access to the "2nd Division" room, in which the player can fight all final bosses and talk to the game's programmers.

== Plot ==
At the outset, the player can choose any one of seven main characters to play as, each with their own storyline:

- Asellus (アセルス), formerly a human girl, was run over by a carriage and given a blood transfusion by the Mystic Lord Orlouge. Chosen as the Charm Lord's heir, she is despised by human and mystic alike due to her status as the only half-Mystic in existence. She escapes Orlouge's castle with the help of the Princess White Rose. Asellus and White Rose remain on the run from Orlouge's many servants, but after White Rose sacrifices herself to save Asellus's life and freedom, Asellus decides to return and defeat Orlouge, to end the struggle once and for all.
- Blue (ブルー) is a young mage fresh out of magic school. His quest is to collect the "Gift" for as many magics as possible. After that he is destined to fight his twin Rouge who has gained the opposite magics. Whichever brother survives obtains the other's magic and receives the sacred "Life" magic.
- Emilia (エミリア) is a blond ex-con and secret agent formerly working as a model. Her story began when her fiancé Ren was murdered by a mysterious villain known as the "Joker". Wrongfully accused of the crime, she was sentenced to imprisonment in Despair, where she met Annie and Liza. With their help, they complete a competition the warden created to receive a full pardon for their crimes. After their escape, Emilia was recruited by the two to join the secret organization Gradius, which was also hunting for the "Joker".
- Lute (リュート) is a carefree bard whose mother kicked him out of the house until Lute found a decent job. He stumbles face-first into a plot involving Trinity general Mondo and resistance leader Captain Hamilton, and the legacy of Lute's deceased father, who was betrayed and killed by Mondo.
- Red (レッド) is a teenage boy whose family is destroyed by the criminal syndicate called Black X. After being rescued from the same fate by the masked superhero named Alkarl, he is granted the identity of the superhero Alkaiser. After destroying several Black X bases and their main stronghold, Red stands at his father's grave, and Alkarl appears to take Red's powers away, making him a normal man again.
- Riki (リキ) (Known as Kuhn (クーン) in the Japanese release) is a Lummox, a fox-like creature, and one of the last remaining inhabitants of the mysterious world, Margmel. Determined to save his homeworld, he seeks the Rings of Margmel. In his search, he starts out in Scrap, where he finds the researcher Mei-ling. Riki's quest takes him around the regions to gather the Rings until he comes face to face with Virgil, a Mystic Lord. Following the battle, Riki returns home to attempt to restore Margmel.
- T260 is an ancient Mec, a model constructed from junk parts, awakened in modern times. Originally part of a combat ship with a secret mission against the RB3 (Region Buster 3), it lost its memory when it crashed into Junk. With help of Leonard, a human who transferred his memories into a Mec, and Gen, a master swordsman, it recovers its memory and finishes the job.

The Remastered Edition adds an eighth character whose scenario was cut from the original due to time and storage constraints:

- Fuse (ヒューズ) (short for Crazy Fuse (クレイジーヒューズ)) is a patrolman for InterRegional Police Organization (IRPO).

== Development ==
SaGa Frontier was developed by the Square Production Team 2 (referred to as 2nd Division in the game) with Akitoshi Kawazu as director and producer, Koichi Ishii as planning chief, Kenji Ito as composer, and Tomomi Kobayashi as illustrator. Square Production Team 2 included Kyoji Koizumi, Miwa Shoda, Kazuko Shibuya, and Minoru Akao. The musical score for SaGa Frontier was composed and arranged by Kenji Ito, who provided music for many previous entries in the SaGa franchise. Production began in December 1995. The title of this game was "Romancing SaGa 4" during early development. Due to a change in hardware from Super Famicom to PlayStation, Kawazu changed the title. The team did not use 3D graphics, as they were unaware of the hardware capacities at the time.

Pre-release screenshot of the game's title screen showing Fuse (bottom left) as a main scenario

In the earliest stages of development, two more heroes' quests were also being planned in addition to the existing seven lead characters. One of them was Fuse, the IRPO agent who may be enlisted as a playable character in the actual release. In his quest, Fuse was supposed to be able to take part in other characters' scenarios, and the ultimate goal of his quest might be determined by what the player did in the course of gameplay. The "ninth" protagonist was to be the daughter of a channellers family who is engaging in a controversy as to who of them shall inherit the property of their former patriarch. This scenario seems to be dropped during early development because it was viewed as too comedic.

Due to time constraints, some plot points of Asellus story were removed. During those events, Asellus was supposed to visit Dr. Nusakan's clinic, Bio Research Lab, Lambda Base, and Furdo's Workshop so that she would find her true identity so that she would decide to live as a human being or as a mystic. These quests were also intended to affect her scenario's ending. Kawazu later noted both time constraints and disc space issues as the main reasons for cut content, although the notorious ending of Blue's scenario in the middle of his final boss was always planned.

== Release ==
Due to its popularity in Japan, the game has been re-released a number of times at a budget price: in 2000 as part of the Square Millennium Collection, in 2002 as part of the PSone Books best-seller range, and again in 2004 as a part of Square Enix's Ultimate Hits line. In 2008, the game was released on the PlayStation Store in Japan.

=== Soundtracks ===
SaGa Frontier Original Sound Track comprises 75 tracks spanning three compact discs. It was released in Japan on April 21, 1999, by DigiCube and was later reprinted by Square Enix on February 1, 2006. On disc 3 of the soundtrack, there is a hidden track, in the pregap, which can only be heard when rewinding the CD from the beginning; this was originally supposed to be Riki's theme. There also are alternate titles for those pieces of music which can be seen in the songlist in the in-game "2nd Division". Itō states that he wanted to create an arranged album for the game as well, although one has yet to be released.

=== Merchandise ===
Two guidebooks for SaGa Frontier have been published in Japan by ASCII: The Essence of SaGa Frontier and The Complete of SaGa Frontier. Another companion book titled SaGa Frontier How To Walk In Regions was published by Kodansha. BradyGames released its own Saga Frontier: Official Strategy Guide in North America in 1998. When the game was re-issued in Japan in 2000 as part of the Square Millennium Collection, it included a collectible teacup set and a tee-shirt depicting the character Blue.

== Reception ==
Reception

Aggregate scores
| Aggregator | Score |
|---|---|
| GameRankings | PS: 71% |
| Metacritic | NS: 71/100; PC: 77/100; PS4: 77/100 |

Review scores
| Publication | Score |
|---|---|
| Electronic Gaming Monthly | 8/10 |
| Famitsu | 31/40 |
| Game Informer | 7.25/10 |
| GameRevolution | 8.5/10 |
| GameSpot | 6.9/10 |
| HobbyConsolas | 80% |
| IGN | 7/10 |
| Jeuxvideo.com | 15/20 |
| Next Generation | 1/5 |
| RPGamer | PS: 7/10; NS: 4/5 |
| RPGFan | PS: 75% NS: 86% |
| TouchArcade | 3.5/5 |
| Dengeki PlayStation | 80/100, 60/100, 75/100, 75/100 |

Saga Frontier sold over 1.05 million copies in Japan by the end of 1997, and 1.1 million as of 2008. It was the 5th top-selling game in Japan in 1997 and is currently the 15th top-selling PlayStation game for the region.

SaGa Frontier for the PlayStation received mostly mixed or average reviews, and held a 71% on GameRankings. Much criticism arose from its Free Scenario System; critics generally remarked that while the non-linearity of this system is conceptually impressive, it leads to the individual scenarios being shorter and weaker than most contemporary RPGs and to players wasting time exploring dungeons intended for a different protagonist or otherwise wandering around the vast game world without direction. Three of the four critics in Electronic Gaming Monthly's review team saw no problem with the Free Scenario System, praising the storyline and combat, though Shawn Smith said battles are too frequent. The fourth critic, Crispin Boyer, disliked both the non-linearity and the varying difficulty between protagonists, but dismissed these as "minor gripes" and gave the game an 8/10, particularly remarking that the combat system is innovative. In his later review for GameSpot, (Note: The issue of Electronic Gaming Monthly in which Boyer reviewed the game is cover dated May 1998, meaning it was released in March 1998 and the review itself was written in February 1998 at the latest. Boyer's GameSpot review is dated April 27, 1998.) Boyer made much the same comments but emphasized the problems with the non-linearity more and gave it a 6.9/10. He called the game a "solid, if not exactly stellar, RPG that'll certainly keep you busy for a while—or at least until you tire of its occasional lack of focus" and concluded that the many promising upcoming role-playing games like Breath of Fire III made it a holdover title at best. IGN proclaimed SaGa Frontier "the only bruised apple in Square's current collection of role-playing games", similarly stating that the Free Scenario System can become confusing and easily cause the player to become lost. It labelled the story and sprite-based graphics its strong points.

GamePro took a more positive stance, saying that the uniqueness of the Free Scenario System and the ability of certain characters to transform into their opponents set it apart from other RPGs despite the frustration which at times results from the lack of direction. They gave it a 4.5/5 for both sound and control and a perfect 5.0 for both graphics and fun factor. Game Informer found that the plot of SaGa Frontier is more of an outline than a descriptive formula as seen in other Square titles such as Final Fantasy VII and Chrono Trigger. The publication also criticized the game's graphics, but praised its length and gameplay. Staff reviewers at RPGFan and RPGamer agreeably noted the game's battle system to be its highlight; both websites mention that discovering combinations attacks is "fun" and "exciting". Next Generation stated that "With the potential for a deep and involving adventure, SaGa Frontier is a depressing misfire from a company praised for its innovation and high-end titles."

Reviews disagreed on the graphics. Boyer, his three co-reviewers with Electronic Gaming Monthly, and Next Generation all said that the sprites are dated and poorly animated, and that the prerendered backgrounds are flat and non-interactive, and at times make it difficult to see where an area's exit is. Dissenting from this view, GamePro pointed out that the use of prerendered backgrounds was a trick adopted from the critically acclaimed Final Fantasy VII, and IGN argued that with sprite-based graphics being phased out from modern games, their usage in Saga Frontier actually gives the game a look which stands out from other RPGs, enhanced by the inclusion of attractive polygonal effects.

In 2000, SaGa Frontier was voted the 18th best PlayStation game of all time by the editors of Famitsu magazine.

SaGa Frontier Remastered for the PlayStation 4 received generally favorable reviews. The Nintendo Switch version of Remastered received mostly mixed or average reviews.
