= Murata (surname) =

Murata (written: 村田) is a Japanese surname. Notable people with the surname include:

- Akihiro Murata (村田 顕弘; born 1986), Japanese shogi player
- Chiho Murata (村田 智穂; born 1984) Japanese shogi player
- Daishi Murata (村田 大志; born 1988), Japanese rugby union player
- Hideo Murata (村田 英雄; 1929–2002), Japanese singer
- Kanako Murata (村田 夏南子; born 1993), Japanese mixed martial artist
- Kazuma Murata (村田 和麻; born 1991), Japanese field hockey player
- Kiyoko Murata (村田 喜代子; born 1945), Japanese writer
- Koichi Murata (村田 航一; born 1996), Japanese footballer
- Minoru Murata (村田 實; 1894–1937), Japanese movie director, screenwriter and actor
- Naoki Murata (村田 直樹; 1949–2020), 8th dan Japanese judoka and author
- Range Murata (村田 蓮爾; born 1968), Japanese artist and designer
- Ryōta Murata (村田 諒太; born 1986), Japanese boxer
- Sachiko Murata (村田 幸子; born 1943), Japanese scholar of comparative philosophy and mysticism
- Sayaka Murata (村田 沙耶香; born 1979), Japanese writer
- Shigeharu Murata (村田 重治; 1909–1942), Imperial Japanese Navy officer
- Murata Jukō (村田 珠光; 1423–1502), Japanese tea ceremony practicer in the Muromachi period
- Taku Murata (村田 琢; born 1965), Japanese video game programmer
- Toma Murata (村田 透馬; born 2000), Japanese footballer
- Tomohiro Murata (村田 智弘; born 1981), Japanese shogi player
- Yasuji Murata (村田 安司; 1896–1966), Japanese animator
- Yoshitaka Murata (村田 吉隆; born 1944), Japanese politician, chairman of the National Public Safety Commission
- Yukari Murata (村田 由香里; born 1981), Japanese individual rhythmic gymnast
- Yusuke Murata (村田 雄介; born 1978), Japanese manga artist and animator

== See also ==
- Murata Himeko (無量塔 姫子), a character in the Honkai series of video games
