= Forspoken =

2023 action role-playing video game

- Developer: Luminous Productions
- Publisher: Square Enix
- Director: Takeshi Aramaki
- Producer: Akio Ofuji
- Programmers: Hiroshi Iwasaki; Masaki Kobayashi
- Artists: Yoshiaki Yamaguchi; Akihiko Kishi; Yuki Matsuzawa
- Writers: Allison Rymer; Todd Stashwick; Amy Hennig; Gary Whitta
- Composers: Bear McCreary; Garry Schyman
- Engine: Luminous Engine
- Platforms: PlayStation 5; Windows
- Release: January 24, 2023
- Genre: Action role-playing
- Mode: Single-player

Forspoken is a 2023 action role-playing game developed by Luminous Productions and published by Square Enix. The game focuses on fast and fluid terrain traversal, with an open world that allows free exploration. Players control Frey, a young woman transported from New York City to the fantasy world of Athia, where she uses magic to survive and find a way home. Athia is ruled by the tyrannical Tantas.

Forspoken is the debut game from Luminous Productions, created by former Final Fantasy XV staff. Originally called Project Athia, it was developed to showcase the PlayStation 5's power with features such as ray tracing and procedural generation. The writing team includes Gary Whitta and Amy Hennig, while Black Girl Gamers provided consultation on the characterization of Frey. The music was composed by Bear McCreary and Garry Schyman.

The game was released for PlayStation 5 and Windows on January 24, 2023. It received mixed reviews from critics.

== Gameplay ==
According to director Takeshi Aramaki, the gameplay was designed to be focused on terrain traversal speed and fluidity. Square Enix also described the game as a "narrative-driven adventure". The character exists in an open world game format where players are able to travel anywhere at any time.

The player character, Frey, has access to a variety of magical spells. Following each combat encounter, the player earns experience points. Frey's cloaks and necklaces can be swapped and upgraded in order to improve her combat efficiency and stats while applying nail polish unlocks special abilities. The player can also craft new items, or rest at a safe location in order to restore health. While the player is exploring the game world, they may encounter a "breakstorm", a scenario similar to a horde mode in which waves of demonic creatures spawn and attack Frey. The storm ends with the appearance of a named boss character.

== Synopsis ==
=== Setting and characters ===
The protagonist, Alfre "Frey" Holland (Ella Balinska / Umeka Shōji) is a young woman who is transported from New York City to the fantasy world of Athia. She uses magical powers to journey through it and survive in order to find her way home. Athia is under the tyrannical rule of the Tantas, which include Tanta Sila (Janina Gavankar / Yū Sugimoto), Tanta Prav (Pollyanna McIntosh / Rika Fukami), Tanta Olas (Claudia Black / Mie Sonozaki) and Tanta Cinta (Kendal Rae / Kikuko Inoue). Other characters include Frey's sentient bracelet Cuff (Jonathan Cake / Satoshi Mikami), the archivist Johedy (Keala Settle / Kyo Yaoya), and Auden (Monica Barbaro / Sanae Kobayashi).

=== Plot ===
Frey, a young woman abandoned near the Holland Tunnel as a newborn, appears in court for theft and is sentenced to community service. She is ambushed by the gang who forced her to steal but escapes to her house and her cat, Homer. The gang sets the building ablaze, but Frey and Homer escape. Now homeless, Frey entrusts Homer to her sentencing judge and visits Holland Tunnel on her birthday. She is drawn to a strange bangle, which activates a portal that draws her in.

Frey is transported to the world of Athia. The bangle, bonded to her, reveals that it is sentient and can only be heard by her. Frey names him "Cuff" and finds that he has awakened magical abilities within her. She discovers Athia is overrun by a miasma called the Break, which corrupts all life, but she is unaffected by it. Frey reaches the city of Cipal, humanity's refuge from the Break. Its ruling council captures Frey, and distrusting her resistance to the Break, imprisons her, but a citizen named Auden helps her escape to the slums.

Frey learns that Athia was once ruled by the Tantas, four benevolent sorceresses, but they began exuding the Break and oppressing the city's inhabitants. Auden's father, Robian, researched the Break but was lost in it twenty years ago. Frey flees the city and locates Robian, who has suffered partial insanity. They return to Cipal and find Tanta Sila terrorizing the populace in search of Frey. Frey repels Sila and leaves to confront Sila at her domain. After mortally wounding her in battle, Frey absorbs her powers.

Frey receives a hero's welcome at Cipal, but the Break engulfs much of the city. Archivist Johedy explains that the Break's surge was the result of Sila's death; only by killing the remaining Tantas can it be eradicated. A traumatized Frey refuses and decides to use Robian to return to Earth, but his mental state has rapidly deteriorated. While Frey searches for a medicinal sap, Cuff persuades her to negotiate with Tanta Prav. Frey surrenders to Prav and is put on trial for the murder of Sila. Despite Frey passing a trial by water, she is attacked by Prav. Frey defeats her and as she dies, Prav claims that Tanta Cinta is Frey's mother. At Cipal, Frey finds Robian near death. Having worked under Cinta, he confirms that Frey is her daughter before dying. Frey resolves to confront Cinta, but as she leaves, a light consumes her.

Frey wakes up on Earth in an idealized version of her former life with no memory of Athia. Several of her Athian friends live nearby, including Cinta, whom Frey enjoys a relationship with. Cuff contacts Frey, which restores her memories. She discovers Tanta Olas created the illusion and escapes, appearing near Tanta's castle; inside, she finds Olas dead. Cuff takes a humanoid form and identifies himself as Susurrus, an ancient demon awakened by the Rheddig, whom the Tantas waged war against; he was using Frey to steal the Tantas' powers. Cinta arrives and helps Frey escape through another portal.

Frey appears in Svargana, the final resting place for all Tantas, and meets the now-sane Sila, Prav, and Olas. They tell Frey how the Rheddig sent Susurrus to oppress Athia. Though the Tantas defeated him, he split into four and bonded to them, causing their insanity. Frey reunites with Cinta, who reveals that years prior, Robian discovered the portal and Cinta used it to travel to New York, where she became pregnant; the other Tantas then sealed the baby's powers away. After fighting Susurrus, Cinta staved off madness before giving birth to Frey. Fearing she would attempt to harm her child, Cinta sent her to Earth, but the piece of Susurrus sealed to Cinta followed Frey. In the present, Frey's powers return to her and Cinta offers Frey a choice: return to New York, or stay and battle Susurrus.

- If Frey returns to New York, she retrieves Homer and contemplates her uncertain future.
- If Frey remains in Athia, she and Cinta confront Susurrus, during which Cinta is killed. Frey defeats Susurrus, imprisoning him in his cuff form, bonded to her arm permanently. A memorial is held in Cipal for the deceased. In a mid-credits scene, Frey promises to come back for Homer. In the postgame, Frey—now a Tanta—and her allies begin rebuilding Cipal and clearing the Break from Athia, while Cuff begrudgingly cooperates.

== Development ==
Forspoken is the debut project for Luminous Productions; the company was originally assembled from employees working on Final Fantasy XV. Earlier in development, the game was known under the title Project Athia. It was developed to take advantage of the graphical capabilities of the PlayStation 5 and will also release for Windows. Technologies featured in the game include ray tracing for greatly enhanced lighting effects, and procedural generation for the creation of large-scale locations. Initially set to be released on May 24, 2022, Square Enix delayed its release to October 11, 2022, and then to January 24, 2023. The game was set as a PlayStation 5 console exclusive, alongside the PC version for two years following its initial launch. However as of September 2026, more than a year after the game's PlayStation 5 console exclusivity was set to expire, it is yet to be released on other consoles such as the Xbox Series X/S.

The game's writing team includes Gary Whitta, Amy Hennig, Allison Rymer, and Todd Stashwick. Bear McCreary and Garry Schyman composed music for the game. The team approached Brandon Sanderson for the project, but he declined the offer as he was working on another video game project (later revealed to be Moonbreaker) at that time. Consulting company Black Girl Gamers provided feedback for main character Frey.

A month after the game's release, Square Enix announced that Luminous Productions would be absorbed back into Square Enix in May 2023 to "further bolster the competitive prowess of the Group's development studios". Luminous Productions said that they would remain committed to Forspoken in the meantime, with patch updates and releasing downloadable content. On May 26, 2023, the DLC In Tanta We Trust was released, with a three-day early access period for owners of the Digital Deluxe Edition.

== Reception ==
=== Critical response ===
Reception

Aggregate scores
Aggregator	Score
Metacritic	(PC) 59/100 (PS5) 64/100
OpenCritic	30% recommend

Review scores
Publication	Score
Destructoid	7/10
Digital Trends	3.5/5 stars
Easy Allies	8/10
Famitsu	35/40
Game Informer	7.5/10
GameSpot	5/10
GamesRadar+	2.5/5 stars
Hardcore Gamer	2/5
IGN	6/10
NME	3/5 stars
PC Gamer (US)	65/100
Push Square	6/10 stars
RPGFan	80/100
Shacknews	6/10
The Guardian	2/5 stars
VG247	3/5 stars

Forspoken received "mixed or average" reviews from critics, according to review aggregator website Metacritic, and 30% of critics recommended the game according to OpenCritic.

Ash Parrish of The Verge praised the game's parkour system, saying it made the game's otherwise empty world "enthralling" to traverse, although they felt the combat was "one-note" and "kinda useless" in comparison. Kyle Hilliard, for Game Informer, stated it was unfortunate that the game "makes a bad first impression", noting "Athia's environments look great" and the "story and dialogue improve the deeper you get". Chris Moyse of Destructoid highlighted an "inescapable" comparison between Forspoken's "open-world adventure" to "Ubisoft titles such as Assassin's Creed, Watch Dogs, and Far Cry" since its framework is very similar "to the veteran Ubisoft mold". While he felt it was "undoubtedly fun to traverse" the world, he also felt the "design methodology" was "out-of-step with the possibilities provided by the title's story, characters, themes, and combat". Tomas Franzese of Digital Trends opined that "Forspoken's earliest hours are its worst"; however, he thought the game eventually had a "rewarding open-world design". He also commented that the "narrative's broad strokes generally work, as it has fun showing players its world through the eyes of a woman who constantly refuses the call to adventure". Grayson Morley of Polygon criticized Forspoken's slow start and noted that the game ended by the time it had presented the player with a full range of abilities. Moyse also similarly noted the delay in unlocking magical styles and that it takes a while before the player "can build a bespoke combat style that brings the battle to life". Hilliard viewed the game's combat as "consistently mediocre" and while an action game, commented that it has similarities to a third-person shooter "as most of Frey's abilities function like magical guns".

The game's style of dialogue received criticism from players for its perceived awkwardness and poor quality, and became the subject of internet memes. Moyse viewed the game's leads as "uniformly on point", noting that Frey is "a great protagonist" who is "also funny as fuck" with a "comedic self-defense nature and even 'That Line' perfectly apt when delivered in given context". Franzese commented that it was "heartening to see a non-white protagonist in a major video game" and noted that while Forspoken hints at deeper racial themes, its engagement treats them as "little more than backstory and narrative window dressing". Franzese opined that despite the game's narrative flaws, Ella Balinska delivers "a strong performance", with her "passion for Frey" shining through even in jargon-heavy monologues. By the end, Hilliard "liked Frey's overly vulgar and combative nature" and her dynamic with Cuff; he enjoyed the unsurprising but "well executed" story twists which gave meaningful context to Frey's reluctance to be a hero and was satisfied with where the game leaves her.

=== Sales ===
In Japan, the PlayStation 5 version of Forspoken sold 29,055 physical units during its first week of release, making it the third best-selling retail game in the country. In the UK, Forspoken debuted at number four on the physical sales chart. In Europe, the game debuted at number 11 on the European Monthly Charts. In the US it was the seventh best-selling game in the country in January 2023.

In February 2023, during a financial results briefing, Square Enix president Yosuke Matsuda said sales of the game had been "lacklustre" and it along with the rest of the Square Enix portfolio that month posed a "considerable downside risk to [their] FY2023/3 earnings", attributing this to "challenging" reviews, however he also noted that it received some positive feedback.
