= Chiho =

- Language: Japanese

Origin
- Meaning: Various, including: 千穂: "a thousand ears of grain"; 千帆: "a thousand sails"; 千歩: "a thousand paces"; 知保: "knowledge and protection"

Chiho is a feminine Japanese given name. The meaning differs based on the kanji used to write it; it may also be written solely in hiragana. Notable people with this name include:

- Chiho Aoshima (青島 千穂, born 1974), Japanese pop artist and member of Takashi Murakami's Kaikai Kiki Collective
- Chiho Arai (荒井 千歩, born 1991), Japanese child actress
- Chiho Hamada (浜田 千穂, born 1992), Japanese freestyle wrestler
- Chiho Ishida (石田 千穂; born 2002), Japanese idol and singer
- Chiho Murata, women's professional shogi player
- Chiho Osawa (大澤 ちほ; born 1992), Japanese ice hockey player
- Chiho Saito (斉藤 千穂, born 1967), Japanese manga artist, most noted for the manga Revolutionary Girl Utena
- Chiho Takao (高尾 千穂, born 1984), Japanese freestyle skier
- Chiho Torii (鳥居 千穂, born 1970), Japanese volleyball player
- Chiho Watanabe (渡辺 千穂; born 1972), Japanese screenwriter
