= BGG =

BGG may refer to:

- Before Green Gables, a novel by Budge Wilson, as a prequel to Anne of Green Gables
- Big Green Gathering, an annual festival in Somerset, England
- Bingöl Airport, Turkey (IATA code: BGG)
- Black Girl Gamers, a gaming community
- BoardGameGeek, a board gaming website
- Brigg railway station, Lincolnshire, England (station code: BGG)
- Briggs & Stratton, an American engine manufacturer (NYSE stock code: BGG)
- Bugun language of Arunachal Pradesh, India (ISO 639-3 code: bgg)
