= Dragon Quest X =

2012 video game

- Cover art for the score book
- Developer: Square Enix (Note: Additional development support by Orca. Mobile port co-developed with NTT DoCoMo and Ubitus. 3DS version assistance by Toylogic)
- Publisher: Square Enix (Note: Chinese version published by Shanda)
- Directors: Jin Fujisawa (2012–2013); Chikara Saito (2013–2017); Takashi Anzai (2017–)
- Producers: Yosuke Saito (2012–2018); Koji Aoyama (2018–2024); Kazuya Ozono (2024–)
- Designer: Yuji Horii
- Programmer: Nobutaka Nishioka
- Artists: Akira Toriyama; Eiichiro Nakatsu
- Writers: Yuji Horii; Jin Fujisawa; Atsushi Narita
- Composer: Koichi Sugiyama
- Series: Dragon Quest
- Engine: Crystal Tools
- Platforms: Wii, Wii U, Windows, Android, iOS, Nintendo 3DS, PlayStation 4, Nintendo Switch
- Release: August 2, 2012: Version 1; Wii; JP: August 2, 2012 Wii U; JP: March 30, 2013 Windows; JP: September 26, 2013 Android, iOS; JP: December 16, 2013 3DS; JP: September 4, 2014; Version 2; Wii, Wii U, Windows; JP: December 5, 2013; Version 3; Wii, Wii U, Windows; JP: April 30, 2015; Version 4; Wii U, Windows, PS4, Switch; JP: November 16, 2017; Version 5; Wii U, Windows, PS4, Switch; JP: October 24, 2019; Version 6; Wii U, Windows, PS4, Switch; JP: November 12, 2021; Version 7; Windows, PS4, Switch; JP: March 21, 2024; Version 8; Windows, PS4, Switch; JP: June 25, 2026; Browser Version; Windows, Mobile; JP: February 25, 2020
- Genre: Massively multiplayer online role-playing
- Mode: Multiplayer

Dragon Quest X: Awakening of the Five Tribes Online, (Note: Known in Japan in Version 1 as Dragon Quest X: Mezameshi Itsutsu no Shuzoku Online (Japanese: ドラゴンクエストX 目覚めし五つの種族 オンライン).) also known as Dragon Quest X Online, (Note: Japanese: ドラゴンクエストX オンライン) is a 2012 massively multiplayer online role-playing game (MMORPG) by Square Enix. It is the tenth mainline entry in the Dragon Quest series. It was originally released for the Wii and was later ported to the Wii U, Windows, PlayStation 4, Nintendo Switch, Android, iOS, and Nintendo 3DS. Other than a discontinued Windows version in China, the game was not released outside of Japan. A single-player remake, Dragon Quest X Offline, was released in Japan in 2022 and later throughout Asia.

Dragon Quest X is set in the world of Astoltia, with the player character being initially human before an attack by Nelgel the Netherlord, after which their soul is forced into the body of another race and their sibling is accidentally transported to the past by the player character in an attempt to protect them from Nelgel. Following this, they must travel the world on a quest to seal Nelgel away. Gameplay follows a combination of elements from the Dragon Quest and other contemporary MMORPGs, such as real-time combat in an open world environment and a job system tied to skills and abilities.

Concepts for an MMORPG within the Dragon Quest series began among a small team during the later development of Dragon Quest VIII. Development progressed alongside that of Dragon Quest IX. The aim was to make it accessible to series fans and newcomers alike, along with creating a long-term content plan. The development team featured multiple series veterans, including series creator and designer Yuji Horii, artist Akira Toriyama, and composer Koichi Sugiyama. New staff members included producer Yosuke Saito, who had previously worked on the Drakengard series and whose company Orca helped with development; and Chikara Saito, who took over as director in 2013.

Critical reception to the game have been generally positive, with praise going to its integrating of Dragon Quest features into an MMORPG structure. The game has since received several expansion packs and other updates. By 2014, the game had sold over one million copies.

== Gameplay ==
Dragon Quest X is a massively multiplayer online role-playing game (MMORPG), where a customized player character travels the world of Astoltia completing quests and fighting monsters. While starting out as a human character, the player character is later transferred into the body of one of five available tribes: the powerful Ogre, the inquisitive Poppet, the aquatic Weddie, the forest-dwelling Elves, and the mining Dwarfs. Humans populate multiple settlements across Astoltia. Later versions added an additional Dragon race, although it is unavailable as an option for player characters. The game utilizes cloud storage for save files and other game data. As with most MMORPGs, Dragon Quest X requires a subscription fee to access; however, there is a daily two-hour window dubbed "Kid's Time" where players can access and play the game free of charge.

Combat in Dragon Quest X, with the player character and current partners fighting an enemy in the battle arena

Battles are triggered when the player encounters an enemy in the overworld. Battles take place in a themed arena, using a version of the Active Time Battle system: each side is given a turn in which to perform an action such as attacking. Each side can also interrupt an opponent's action, prolonging their waiting time. At the end of battle, players are granted experience points, which raise their experience level and boost their maximum health and statistics, in addition to in-game currency. Players can form a three-strong party to fight monsters, explore and battle alone, or loan non-active player characters of a similar or lower experience level for a fee, which are then controlled in battle by the game's artificial intelligence. Any character can be loaned to three different people, and the loaned character keeps the experience points and gold that they have earned.

Player characters' combat abilities and skills are dictated by a character class-based job system. The jobs in the initial launch were Warrior, Priest, Mage, Martial Artist, Thief, and Minstrel. Later updates added further jobs, such as the Beast Tamer and Dancer. Each job has a separate skill point system that allows customization, and jobs can be changed at dedicated temples found in each major town. Player characters can also adopt Trades, skills that include woodwork, weapon and armor forging among others. Each Trade skill requires materials gathered from the overworld, which are then used to create a specific type of equipment unique to the gathered materials and Trade. Weapons and items are acquired either in battle alongside in-game currency or through Guilds scattered through Bazaars located in major towns. Guilds will forge new gear, weapons and items for a combined fee of money and materials salvaged from the game world. Also found in towns are vendors where excess items can be stored, merchants which buy and sell various items, and tailor's establishments where the player character can gain new outfits.

== Synopsis ==
The story begins in the village of Tenton, focusing on the protagonist living with their sibling. The peace is shattered when Nelgel, the Lord of Hell, attacks the village. The protagonist's soul is transported to a shrine and placed within the body of a member of the five non-human tribes, while their sibling is accidentally transported to the past by the protagonist in an attempt to protect them from Nelgel. Under the guidance of a sage, the protagonist travels the main five continents of Astoltia searching for sacred emblems with which to reach Nelgel's lair. After collecting six out of ten emblems, the sage attempts to form a bridge to Nelgel's lair. This fails, and he decides to separate the protagonist's soul from their body in a desperate attempt to try another method. This proves to be successful, as the protagonist then meets their body's original owner.

The protagonist's mission is made clear when they realize that a sacred vessel called the Ark of the Heavens is the only thing that can penetrate Nelgel's defenses. The protagonist then travels 500 years into the past, where the Ark of the Heavens was last used in recorded history. After fighting Razerburn, a demon bent on bringing Nelgel to life, the protagonist forges a friendship with a young boy who knew the secret to using the Ark of the Heavens. Returning to the present, the protagonist enters Nelgel's lair to confront him, and emerges successful after a long battle. During the end credits, the protagonist is greeted by the sage from before, who informs them that despite Nelgel's defeat, the seal he had created to block access to the central continent is still active.

In the first expansion, the protagonist travels to Rendacia, the central continent of Astoltia sealed off by Nelgel, only to discover an ominous atmosphere hanging over the land. The protagonist investigates the truth behind recent happenings in Rendacia while continuing to work towards stopping Nelgel's legacy for good. In the second expansion, the protagonist becomes embroiled in trying to prevent a series of kidnappings seemingly orchestrated by their sibling and a mysterious hooded man. They eventually journey to the world of Nadragand to rescue the kidnapping victims and assist an enigmatic race of draconic people defeat an ancient evil plaguing their world. The third expansion has the protagonist travel across several periods of time in the distant past and future, hoping to stop a future where Astoltia is completely destroyed while learning of their own origins. In the fourth expansion, the protagonist travels to the world of the demons themselves, and fights to stop an evil that has plagued Astoltia since the time of its creation. In the fifth expansion, the protagonist's heroic deeds in the world of the demons attracts the attention of the heavens themselves, and the protagonist is summoned there as one of ten candidates for the creation of new deities. In the sixth expansion, the protagonist travels to another world in an attempt to save Astoltia from a curse that erases people from reality, making it seem like they never existed at all, while learning about the origins of Astoltia itself.

== Development ==
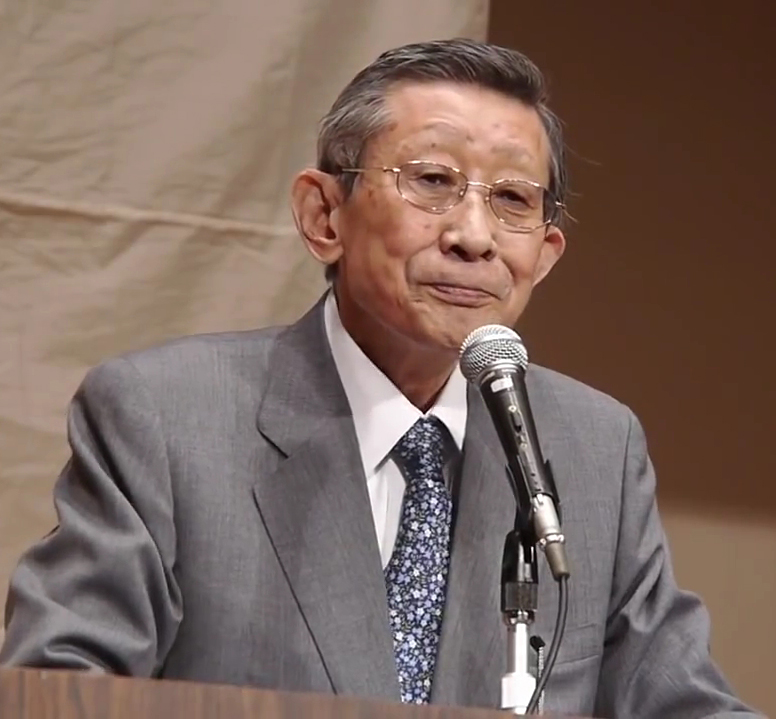
Series veteran developers such as artist Akira Toriyama and composer Koichi Sugiyama (pictured) returned for Dragon Quest X.

Dragon Quest X was developed by Square Enix. This was the first modern Dragon Quest title to be developed by Square Enix, as earlier mainline entries had been handled by external companies. The CGI opening was handled by Square Enix's CGI department Visual Works. The game was directed by Jin Fujisawa, who also directed Dragon Quest IX. The scenario was written by Fujisawa, with later scenario support by Atsushi Narita. Horii served as game designer and general project director. Series art designer Akira Toriyama returned to design the characters, while the music was composed by series veteran Koichi Sugiyama. One of the chief planners was Naoki Yoshida, who had worked on earlier Dragon Quest spin-offs, and was later assigned as the director of Final Fantasy XIV and its reboot A Realm Reborn. A newcomer to the series was producer Yosuke Saito, who worked as an executive producer on the Drakengard series before producing its spin-off game Nier. After Cavia closed in 2010, Saito formed his own company Orca, which was chosen by Square Enix to support the development of Dragon Quest X. Due to this, work had to be scrapped on a PlayStation Vita version of Nier. Saito had earlier worked with MMORPGs when he was involved with the development of Cross Gate (2001). A second newcomer was Chikara Saito who, after working on Dragon Quest X during its development alongside Cross Treasures, would take over as the game's director in 2013.

When speaking about why an online game was chosen as the next step in the series, Fujisawa cited the intuitive character AI in Dragon Quest IV and party member communication in Dragon Quest VII. Solid ideas for an online game set within the Dragon Quest series were first suggested in 2005, when development was wrapping up on Dragon Quest VIII. It was initially worked on by a very small team, who worked together on the groundwork for some time. A core part of the initial plan was that the game would have a pre-planned ten-year lifespan with continual content updates. Once work had finished on Dragon Quest IX, Dragon Quest X took full priority. During these earlier phases, it was still undecided whether to make the game a mainline title, and there was even doubt as to whether it could be an MMORPG rather than just an online multiplayer game. These doubts, held by Saito, were assuaged by Fujisawa's confidence in the project. Despite this, Fujisawa was a novice at both developing and playing MMORPGs, putting him in stark contrast with other staff members such as Saito, Yoshida and second chief planner Takashi Anzai.

The change to a new genre presented multiple challenges to the team: while standard RPGs were designed around a scripted experience, MMORPGs were more reliant on a true sense of unscripted adventure. A major disadvantage was that Fujisawa was inexperienced with working on MMORPGs. The first major developmental issue was the need in an MMORPG to have a full customizable character. Another related problem was the initial premise of an unseen force as the threat, which was unusual within the form. Fujisawa rationalized it into a kind of "common sense" related to the interaction between player community and necessary events within the game world that worked against accepted principles of MMORPG gameplay, which resulted in multiple staff members raising doubts as to whether the game could work. The second major issue was what types of environments to include or discard, and for this Fujisawa was prepared due to his long experience with the franchise. On top of this, the staff needed to evaluate what would work for an MMORPG in the unpredictable Japanese gaming market, which unlike other parts of the world was not a major consumer of MMORPGs. Their main object for comparison was World of Warcraft, which by that time had 12 million players worldwide but only had a small holding in Japan. While this appeared discouraging, there had not been many titles of similar scale and success within the country, so there was both space for and detractions against an equivalent MMORPG experience.

During this evaluation process, three key constraints were pinned down for the developers to face. The first was hardware related, as the Wii had a limited lifespan as a viable console; the second was the requirement of a subscription, a necessity to make the game profitable; and the third was a natural reticence against playing an online-only title. The Wii had been chosen as the game's platform due to its large install base and popularity in Japan, but it would inevitably be left behind for newer consoles, so it was decided to create future versions of Dragon Quest X for other viable platforms. To combat the monetary concerns, the team looked at the typical flat rate subscription, which at the time was between ¥1200 (US$12) and ¥2000 (US$20), then set it at ¥1000 (US$10) so it would be attractive to more casual gamers while still being profitable. Despite the low fee, Fujisawa felt that this might turn away long-term fans who were not hardcore gamers. The solution was "Kid's Time", which despite the name was intended as a means for people of all ages to have free access to the game. Regardless of its online approach, the opening of the game was designed as an offline introductory experience. This caused technical issues for the developers: online game processing was divided between online servers and the hardware, while the opening relied entirely on the hardware, resulting in slowdown issues that needed addressing. "Kid's Time" offered a solution to the third constraint. The game made use of Square Enix's Crystal Tools game engine, making it the only Square Enix game outside the Final Fantasy series to make use of it. Cloud saves were used in place of USB storage as that would have taken up too much space on the Wii hardware and made it potentially impossible for players to store either saves or other downloaded games.

The gameplay was intended to stay true to the Dragon Quest formula within the design necessities and limitations of an MMORPG. During an earlier development phase, the UI featured a large amount of information showing the various player statuses, but seeking to streamline and simplify the game, they removed most of the display. A different gameplay challenge was presented by the move from turn-based to real-time battles, which went against the traditions of the Dragon Quest series. Fujisawa wanted to implement the classic battle system, but was opposed by Horii and other staff members, who successfully pushed for a real-time combat system. Elements of that battle system, such as the ability to halt enemy momentum as a battle mechanic, proved extremely challenging for the developers. Speaking about the difference between Dragon Quest X and Final Fantasy XIV: A Realm Reborn, Yoshida said that they needed to preserve the atmosphere of a normal Dragon Quest title despite MMORPGs not being designed for solo playing. It was for this reason that the loaning of player characters as NPC party members was incorporated. During later development, and following the game's release, the main focus was on balancing the various elements, items and weapons so as to create a level playing field, in addition to keeping the in-game economy balanced. Several features featured in earlier entries, such as the Casino and Coliseum, needed to be kept back for a later time.

The scenario was based around the concept of five different races, and the interaction with a human character. The story premise of a human character becoming a member of one of the five playable races was born out of a compromise about who and what the player character should be. The concept of a non-human character was introduced by Horii as he saw an inherent contradiction in the idea of a human saving the other tribes. This raised some contention among the staff including Fujisawa due to the Dragon Quest series' established convention of a human as the main protagonist, but Fujisawa and Horii decided to have the player character be a human first and later become one of the five tribes. Part of the story's initial drama came from the player character growing accustomed to their new form. Once the basic scenario concept had been finalized, the team commissioned the various character designs from Toriyama. In contrast to the greater majority of MMORPGs, which did not seem to have a solid ending, the team wanted to create a definitive ending with a final boss as featured in normal RPGs.

On 23 March, 2026, Square Enix announced a collaboration with Google Gemini for use in the game. The Chatty Slimey AI is used to have conversations with the player and provide tips on playing the game.

== Release ==
Dragon Quest X was first hinted at during a Square Enix press conference in December 2008 when Horii revealed that the game was being developed for the Wii. The game's year of release, status as an MMORPG, and its eventual release on Wii U were announced in September 2011. Applications for the beta test opened in November 2011, with the beta beginning on February 23 the following year. Beta testers received a beta disk, USB memory stick and gameplay manual. The beta environment gave players access to multiple bosses and a limited amount of the early story. The original version was released on August 2, 2012, for Wii. In addition to the standard release, a Wii bundle was released. A supplementary app for the Nintendo 3DS, with functions connected to both the 3DS functions in in-game messaging, was released for free on August 22. Following the initial release, Square Enix doubled the amount of active servers to cope with crowding issues, while they worked on creating a larger permanent server increase. Support for the Wii version ended in 2017.

The Wii U version was released on March 30, 2013, and it replaced the synthesized MIDI soundtrack with the orchestrated soundtrack performed by the Tokyo Metropolitan Symphony Orchestra. The beta test began on March 5. A port for Windows was released on September 26. Ports to both the PlayStation 4 (PS4) and Nintendo Switch were announced as being in development in August 2016. These ports were released in 2017; the PS4 version was released on August 17, and the Switch version on September 21, 2017. With the announcement of the Switch version, Square Enix offered players the option of switching their characters and progress to the Switch version. In addition to the standard home console releases, versions for portable and mobile platforms have been released that rely on cloud streaming, needing an internet connection to function. A version for Android and iOS was co-developed by Square Enix with NTT DoCoMo and Ubitus: NTT DoCoMo's dGame service was used as the release platform, while Ubitus' cloud technology was used for the streaming. It was released on December 16, 2013. A second version was developed for the 3DS, using a similar streaming function to the mobile versions. This version was released on September 4, 2014. On release, the 3DS version suffered from multiple technical problems, including issues with logging in, frequent maintenance periods, disconnection issues, poor sound quality, and the game's native text font being too small for the 3DS screen. The negative feedback caused Square Enix to temporarily stop shipments so they could fix the issues.

The game receives regular story and gameplay updates, spaced out at ten-week intervals. Two physical expansion packs have been released, adding to the main story campaign: Nemureru Yūsha to Michibiki no Meiyū Online (Note: Known in Japanese as (眠れる勇者と導きの盟友 オンライン; lit. The Sleeping Hero and the Guided Allies Online).) on December 5, 2013; and Inishie no Ryuu no Denshou Online (Note: Known in Japanese as (いにしえの竜の伝承 オンライン; lit. Lore of the Ancient Dragon Online).) on April 30, 2015. Both expansions require the original release to function. The second expansion was the last to be released for the Wii prior to the end of service for the console. A bundle containing the original game and its two expansion packs, Dragon Quest X All-In-One Package, was released for Wii, Wii U, and Windows on August 7, 2014. The PS4 and Switch ports are both being released as the All-In-One Package. A third expansion is planned for release in 2017. The game is region locked to Japan and the United States (which was granted unofficial access in 2019), as Square Enix implements IP blocking software to prevent external access. These restrictions were temporary removed for a few weeks in 2014, but returned. The game also received a manga adaptation, titled Dragon Quest: Souten no Soura. It is written by Yuuki Nakashima with supervision by Horii, and published by Shueisha.

Dragon Quest X is one of the few Dragon Quest games that has not received a release in the West as well as the only mainline entry not to be released in the West in any form, despite fan demand. When asked in 2014 whether they would like to localize the game, the lead staff said they would "love to". In multiple interviews, staff have outlined the problems with localizing the title: the two main issues are the amount of text, and technical issues related to the servers and other elements involved in operating an MMORPG over multiple regions. A later interview at the 2016 Electronic Entertainment Expo revealed that Square Enix was testing the waters for the possible localization of Dragon Quest X and Dragon Quest XI with the recent Western 3DS releases of Dragon Quest VII and Dragon Quest VIII, in addition to new releases such as Dragon Quest Heroes and Dragon Quest Builders. In 2016, Square Enix stated that if enough fans demanded it, they would make efforts to bring Dragon Quest X overseas. That same year, a Chinese language version for Windows was localized for China. The Chinese language version was shut down in May 2019.

== Versions and expansions ==
Dragon Quest X Online is structured around a series of major content releases named "versions". The first version serves as the base game, while subsequent versions function as expansion packs, which are released every few years. Each expansion continues the main scenario while introducing new characters, locations, monsters, quests, vocations, and gameplay features.

Version	Title	Release Date	Notes
1	Awakening of the Five Tribes (目覚めし五つの種族, Mezameshi Itsutsu no Shuzoku)	August 2, 2012	The base game.
2	The Sleeping Hero and the Guiding Ally (眠れる勇者と導きの盟友, Nemureru Yūsha to Michibiki no Meiyū)	December 5, 2013	
3	Lore of the Ancient Dragon (いにしえの竜の伝承, Inishie no Ryū no Denshō)	April 30, 2015	
4	The 5000 Year Voyage to a Faraway Hometown (5000年の旅路 遥かなる故郷へ, 5000-nen no Tabiji Harukanaru Furusato e)	November 16, 2017	
5	The Priestess of Thorns and the God of Destruction (いばらの巫女と滅びの神, Ibara no Miko to Horobi no Kami)	October 24, 2019	
6	Heroes of the Heavenly Stars (天星の英雄たち, Tenhoshi no Eiyū-tachi)	November 11, 2021	
7	The Slumbering Girl and the Door to the Future (未来への扉とまどろみの少女, Mirai e no Tobira to Madoromi no Shōjo)	March 21, 2024	
8	The Lost Children of Time and Space (時空の迷い子たち, Jikuu no Mayoigo-tachi)	June 25, 2026	The final expansion pack.

== Single-player remake ==
Dragon Quest X Offline
- Developer: B.B. Studio
- Publisher: Square Enix
- Director: Daisuke Iizuka
- Producer: Takuma Shiraishi
- Designer: Yuji Horii
- Programmer: Tomoki Ueno
- Artists: Akira Toriyama; Yasuyuki Takahashi
- Writer: Yuji Horii
- Composer: Koichi Sugiyama
- Engine: Unreal Engine 4
- Platforms: Android, iOS, Nintendo Switch, PlayStation 4, PlayStation 5, Windows
- Release: JP: September 15, 2022; AS: May 28, 2024
- Genre: Role-playing
- Mode: Single-player

A single-player remake of Dragon Quest X was announced at the Dragon Quest 35th Anniversary Special livestream in 2021, along with the Version 6 update for the online game. Titled Dragon Quest X: Awakening of the Five Tribes Offline, (Note: Dragon Quest X: Mezameshi Itsutsu no Shuzoku Offline (ドラゴンクエストX 目覚めし五つの種族 オフライン)) the remake features the same story as Volume 1 of the original but reworks it into a more traditional JRPG experience. It was developed by Bandai Namco Entertainment's B.B. Studio using Unreal Engine 4 instead of Crystal Tools.

The active-time battle system was removed in favor of classic Dragon Quest turn-based combat, and the customizable player character is joined by five party members of different races: Maille (ogre), Ragus (poppet), Fuura (elf), Fuser (wetling), and Dasuton (dwarf); all previously appeared as non-player characters in the original game. The visuals were heavily reworked, with characters appearing in super-deformed style and locations similarly redesigned to fit the smaller scale. The games feature limited cross-connectivity: beating the main story of Offline grants the player an option to start from level 70 in Online, transfer the names of the protagonist and their sibling, and skip to the second expansion.

The game was first announced for release in Japan on February 26, 2022, but was later delayed to September 15, 2022. It was released in other Asian regions on May 28, 2024. The downloadable content based on Version 2, titled The Sleeping Hero and the Guiding Ally, was released in Japan on May 26, 2023. Equal in size to the base game, it introduces a new map, Rendashia, and adds a new party member, Anlucia.

== Reception ==
Japanese gaming magazine Famitsu gave Dragon Quest X a score of 36 points out of 40, who delayed their review until they had sufficient experience with the game after launch. One reviewer praised the presentation "from the warmly familiar world to the story that has a tendency to wrap you up in it". They also praised the gameplay and its openness to accept novice players, despite the reviewer noting that it seemed to take longer to level up a character compared to offline Dragon Quest entries. Two of the other reviewers pointed out issues with messaging, and a lack of guidance about which enemies were too strong for a player character's current level.

In an import preview, Kotaku's Richard Eisenbeis shared Famitsu's praise of how the game was welcoming to players without experience of MMORPGs. An issue he pointed out with exploration and battle was that early sections required either a high level or a party for easy progression, but this eased up later into the game, in addition to enjoying the story and battle system. His main criticisms were the Chat systems, which were clumsy and difficult to use even with the right hardware peripheral, and the overly high amount of experience grinding he needed to do. He finished the preview by calling Dragon Quest X "surprisingly backwards in its execution despite its sometimes inspired ideas and low entry bar".

Matt Walker of Nintendo World Report mainly focused on the gameplay, noting like Eisenbeis that the game required a lot of experience grinding, placed an emphasis on forming a party over playing alone, and made messaging other players a laborious process, despite the overall gameplay being enjoyable and absorbing. As to the graphics, which suffered a slowdown in areas with multiple players, he was impressed by the amount of textures and environmental effects when compared to other Wii titles. He concluded his preview by calling the game "a solid, enjoyable JRPG experience that has promise to be enjoyable for years to come".

An ongoing English fan translation was released in December 2024.

=== Sales and subscriptions ===
During its debut week, Dragon Quest X topped Japanese gaming charts, selling 367,000 copies. By November 2012, the game had shipped over 700,000 copies. The 3DS version also sold well, selling 52,375 units in its first 10 days. As of 2014, the game had sold over one million copies and had a daily user count of 300,000 players.
