= Luminous Productions =

Video game developer, part of Square Enix

Luminous Productions Co., Ltd.
- Native name: 株式会社ルミナス・プロダクション
- Romanized name: Kabushiki gaisha Ruminasu Purodakushon
- Type: Subsidiary
- Industry: Video games
- Predecessor: Square Enix Business Division 2
- Founded: March 27, 2018
- Founder: Hajime Tabata
- Defunct: May 1, 2023
- Fate: Merged into Square Enix
- Headquarters: Japan
- Key people: Yosuke Matsuda (Studio Head); Takeshi Aramaki (Vice President)
- Products: Final Fantasy XV; Forspoken
- Number of employees: 150
- Parent: Square Enix
- Website: www.luminous-productions.com

Luminous Productions Co., Ltd. (株式会社ルミナス・プロダクション, Kabushiki gaisha Ruminasu Purodakushon) was a Japanese video game development studio and a subsidiary of Square Enix. Originally known as Business Division 2, Luminous Productions was the development team responsible for Final Fantasy XV and was one of 12 Business Divisions (internal development and production divisions) that Square Enix had at the time before the company consolidated its development divisions in 2020. The current name and development structure of the studio was formed on 27 March 2018 as an external company.

The aim of the company was to create AAA video games for a global audience using Square Enix's proprietary Luminous Engine.

On 28 February 2023, Square Enix Holdings announced that on 1 May 2023, Luminous Productions would reorganize and merge with Square Enix Co. Ltd internally, citing the merging of the two would "enhance the Group's ability to develop HD games".

In June 2023, it was noticed in CEDEC Awards that Luminous Productions was listed as Creative Business Unit II, the division at Square Enix responsible for the development and production of Dragon Quest, Nier, Bravely Default and Octopath Traveler franchises, showing that the studio was merged under this specific division at the company.

== History ==
=== Formation ===
Luminous Productions was originally assembled from employees working on Final Fantasy XV. While forming a new internal studio from existing ones is common worldwide, it is uncommon in Japan. Since the studio pulled in so many who were working on Final Fantasy XV, Luminous Productions helped with the game alongside their new project. So many were taken from the internal development division Business Division 2 that created Final Fantasy XV that Square Enix stated that it functionally "no longer exists".

=== Focus ===
Its initial goal was to work on video games and "other entertainment content [sic]", but later that year the studio was refocused on just making games, causing to report a thirty-three million dollar loss for the half-year ending on 30 September 2018. The new studio's leader and Final Fantasy XV director Hajime Tabata left Luminous Productions and Square Enix around the same time, and planned future content for Final Fantasy XV was also cancelled. President of Square Enix Yosuke Matsuda clarified that the studio would be a "fusion of cutting-edge technology and art".

Resources shifted to the then-unannounced Forspoken (initially dubbed Project Athia), with the studio continuing to use the Luminous Engine. The game's protagonist, Alfre "Frey" Holland (Ella Balinska), is a young woman who uses magical powers to survive in a fantasy world. According to director Takeshi Aramaki, the gameplay is focused on terrain traversal speed and fluidity. Square Enix also described the game as a "narrative-driven adventure". It was released in 2023 for Microsoft Windows and PlayStation 5.

=== Research and development ===
In 2018, preparations were made to launch a new game, and active development began in 2019. In September 2019, the team released a video called Back Stage on their website to demonstrate the work they were doing with an advanced form of ray tracing they call path tracing. Several projects are in production, including research and engine development. In terms of the number of projects, we have several production lines in motion, including engine development and R&D. Of the 130 employees, approximately 20 are not Japanese, and the studio uses an in-house translator so that the studio can operate globally. A focus of the studio technologically is to not have in-game development and 3D cinematic teams working separately, but making a game that is entirely created in a cinematic mode.

== Video games ==
Year	Title	Platform(s)	Ref.
2016	Final Fantasy XV	PlayStation 4, Xbox One, Windows, Stadia	
2023	Forspoken	PlayStation 5, Windows	
