= Luminous Engine =

Multi-platform game engine by Square Enix

- Developers: Square Enix (2012-2018); Luminous Productions (2018-2023)
- Initial release: June 2012; 13 years ago
- Platform: PlayStation 4, PlayStation 5, Xbox One, Stadia, Microsoft Windows
- Type: Game engine
- License: Proprietary

Luminous Engine (ルミナス・エンジン, Ruminasu Enjin), originally called Luminous Studio (ルミナス・スタジオ, Ruminasu Sutajio), is a multi-platform game engine developed and used internally by Square Enix and later on by Luminous Productions. The engine was developed for and targeted at eighth-generation hardware and DirectX 11-compatible platforms, such as Xbox One, the PlayStation 4, and versions of Microsoft Windows. It was conceived during the development of Final Fantasy XIII-2 to be compatible with next generation consoles that their existing platform, Crystal Tools, could not handle.

The engine powered the tech demos Agni's Philosophy and Witch Chapter 0 initially, and has since been used in two of company's titles—Final Fantasy XV, an entry in their Final Fantasy franchise, and an original IP titled Forspoken. In early 2018, the development team of Final Fantasy XV was established by Square Enix as a new subsidiary studio dubbed Luminous Productions. The aim was to create new AAA video games for a global audience using the Luminous Engine.

== History ==
=== Origins ===
According to Julien Merceron, the Worldwide Technology Director for Square Enix in the early 2010s, the concept for the new engine was born in 2011 while he was in the final stages of working on Final Fantasy XIII-2. This was a difficult period for Square Enix: the project then known as Final Fantasy Versus XIII was hitting technical barriers as it transitioned to open-world environments its original Crystal Tools engine could not handle, and Final Fantasy XIV had met with a disastrous launch due to development and technical problems. Faced with these issues, Square Enix decided to bring in former developers from Sega to create new engines for their products, including Luminous Studio. Talking about sharing the engine, Merceron said that he advised the company to avoid sharing between companies or internally between games until the engine had been finalized with the released game: this resulted in Luminous Studio being restricted to what would become Final Fantasy XV during development, while other major next-generation titles would use other outsourced engines.

The construction of Luminous was similar in concept to Epic Games' Unreal Engine or the Unity engine from Unity Technologies in that it incorporated all the development tools needed from asset editing onward, as well as being "high quality, easy to use, flexible, high speed, compact, and supporting both manual and automatic [game development methods]". The development team drew inspiration for this concept and approach from Unreal Engine and Crytek's CryEngine. The name "Luminous" was chosen to reflect the crystal theme of the Final Fantasy series. There were many major factors that the team considered while building the engine, as they wanted to ensure the highest possible quality for high-end games. Some of the environmental factors included lighting, shading and modeling. A core feature of the gameplay was the artificial intelligence (AI), which had previously been liable to become unstable or poor under certain conditions or with poor programming due to the large number of individual codes needed. For Luminous, the team created a single unifying flexible framework to control the scale of the AI while also making it intuitive. It was intended to be used in-house rather than licensed out to other developers, but that western subsidiaries of the company would have access to it. In addition, they also built in the ability to blend graphical assets designed for CG scenery with highly advanced real-time animation, making the two graphically similar. Luminous Studio was publicly revealed in 2011.

The head of the project was Yoshihisa Hashimoto, Square Enix's Chief Technology Officer, who had moved over to the company from Sonic Team in 2009 and became involved with development in 2011. Other key Square Enix staff members working on Luminous Studio include Takeshi Nozue, Akira Iwata and Hiroshi Iwasaki. While ground work was being laid for Luminous, members of the team traveled to look at engine technology being developed by IO Interactive, Crystal Dynamics and Eidos Montréal, western video game developers who became subsidiaries after the company bought out Eidos Interactive. Square Enix's western subsidiaries shared information about game engine development from their experience developing the CDC and Glacier 2 game engines and shared their source code with the Luminous Studio team. During 2012, one third of the final development team was from western subsidiaries of the company. Luminous was developed based on high-end DirectX 11 technology. While designed for eighth-generation video games, it was said to also be compatible with any console and hardware that could handle shaders, such as PlayStation 3 and Xbox 360. Its compatibility with Nintendo's seventh-gen hardware such as the Wii and Nintendo 3DS was doubted, as those consoles did not support shaders. During this early stage, they were looking into the possibility of adjusting the engine for use on Wii U. The company were hoping to promote Luminous as a kind of brand, showing off the logo and tech demo when they were ready.

=== Agni's Philosophy ===
Preview of the gaming engine while editing after a showing of "Agni's Philosophy" at E3 in 2012

Agni's Philosophy is a tech demo created by Square Enix to show off the capacities of Luminous Studio. The demo was a collaboration between the cinematic Visual Works division—a section of the company generally associated with CGI movie production for the company's video games—and Square Enix's R&D department, Advanced Technology Division, with a goal to create a real-time graphics tech demo that has a quality coming as close as possible to pre-rendered CGI. Development of the demo took approximately half a year. Unlike previous technology demos created by the company, which were based on pre-existing games, Square Enix decided to create something completely original. The demo was themed around the Final Fantasy series: during discussions, the team asked the question "What is Final Fantasy?", broke down its basic components and used them, along with added unusual elements, in the demo. A focus during the demo's development was the creation of Agni, the central character. For the demo, as it was a work-in-progress, they optimized it for graphical performance. While the story and themes were created by the Japanese staff, many of the character designs were done by staff from their western subsidiaries. The technology to create the demo was all sourced from then-existing high-end PCs. An initial mock up of Agni's hair was created using a mannequin and wig styled by a professional make-up artist. Each character's face was constructed around mo-capped footage of live actors, then tweaked and expanded in post-production. The entire development process, from conception through development, took approximately a year. Agni's Philosophy was first shown at E3 2012 as part of a special presentation by Square Enix. As part of the presentation, guest speakers paused the demo and adjusted elements of the characters on the fly to show off the engine's customization features. It was also shown at SIGGRAPH 2012.

The Agni's Philosophy tech demo was running at 60 frames per second, used 1.8 GB of texture data per frame, and pushed ten million polygons per frame, with approximately 300,000 to 400,000 polygons for each character model. There is a scene where 100,000 illuminated firefly-like insects appear on screen, each one a full polygon mesh model with body and wings, which proceed to merge to generate a summoned monster. Production for the demo began in June 2011, and was initially produced as pre-rendered CGI animation by Visual Works before Square Enix attempted to reproduce it entirely in real-time with the Luminous Studio engine, using the same assets as the CGI version.

=== Final Fantasy XV ===
Prior to its rebranding from Final Fantasy Versus XIII and full move onto eighth-generation consoles, Final Fantasy XV used lighting technology from Luminous along with a purpose-built proprietary gameplay engine. For its E3 2013 re-reveal under its new title, the company used a specially-created engine environment named Ebony. In July 2014, Hashimoto left the company, citing personal reasons. While still working as an advisor for Luminous Studio, his position as project leader was filled by Remi Driancourt, a senior engineer who had worked with games featuring Luminous technology. The version of XV shown off at Tokyo Game Show and Jump Festa that year ran on Luminous 1.4, which combined Luminous with components created for Ebony. The Episode Duscae game demo ran on version 1.5, and the developers plan for the final game to run on version 2.0.

With Luminous Studio, real-time scenes in XV have five million polygons per frame, with character models made up of about 100,000 polygons each. Character models for XV were constructed with 600 bones, estimated as roughly 10-12 times more than seventh generation hardware. About 150 bones are used for the face, 300 for the hair and clothes, and 150 for the body. For the characters' hair, the team used the same technique as with the characters in Agni's Philosophy. The inner hair for each character uses about 20,000 polygons, five times more than seventh generation hardware. The data capacity for textures is also much greater than before. Each character uses 30 MB of texture data, and ten levels of detail. While seventh-generation games used 50 to 100 MB of texture data for a scene, Final Fantasy XV can use about sixteen times this amount on the PlayStation 4 console. 2048×2048 and 4096×4096 texels are used for the HD textures. For the Microsoft Windows port, Luminous Studio was upgraded using technology from Nvidia.

=== Witch Chapter 0 ===
In April 2015, Square Enix announced that the engine would support DirectX 12, and Nvidia revealed a new real-time tech demo developed by Square Enix for the engine, called Witch Chapter 0 [cry], featuring the character Agni from the earlier Agni's Philosophy demo. The demo renders over 63 million polygons per frame, uses "8K by 8K" resolution textures, and her hair is rendered with over 50 shaders, with each strand of hair rendered as a polygon. It also portrays human crying with a high level of detail, and the quality of the real-time graphics have been compared to pre-rendered CGI animation. The tech demo took a year to produce, and was running on a PC with four GeForce GTX Titan X graphics cards. In October 2016, Square Enix registered for the trademark "Luminous Studio Pro" before the release of Final Fantasy XV.

== Features ==
- Ambient occlusion, including shadows, spherical harmonics and screen space ambient occlusion
- Animation system, including character bone animation, animation AI routines, full body IK (inverse kinematics), procedural animation, and muscle based facial animation
- Anti-aliasing, including MSAA, FXAA, and Yebis 2 image-based anti-aliasing
- Artificial intelligence, including reactive AI, animation AI, and GPGPU support
- Deferred rendering, including deferred lighting (light pre-pass rendering)
- Depth buffering
- Development tools, modules and software for level editing, animation, game editing and shader authoring
- DirectX 11 and DirectX 12 support
- Dynamic day-night cycle, including time of day cycling
  - Dynamic cloud system, including full cloud simulation
- Environment mapping, including cube mapping
- Eye shader, including specular reflection, highlighting, refraction, tears, and eyeball shader, including eye depth and transparency layer
- Global illumination, including real-time global illumination, indirect illumination and real-time glossy indirect illumination
  - Fast global illumination baking via ray-bundle tracing, including radiance exchange via rasterisation, ray direction sampling, fast lightmap baking via tessellation, and ray-bundle tracing, with performance of 200 million rays per second on GTX 580
  - Adaptive ray-bundle tracing, using adaptive tiling technique with memory usage prediction, an acceleration technique to efficiently generate lightmaps for fast global illumination in large scenes
  - Path tracing, including real-time bidirectional path tracing via rasterisation, bidirectional sampling, and artifact suppression technique for glossy surfaces
  - Ray tracing solutions, including ray tracing approximation and fake ray tracing shader
- GPGPU and multi-core support, including GPGPU acceleration and GPGPU support for AI and physical simulation
- GPU computation, for particles, hair, cloth and visual effects
- Hair simulation, for hair and beard, including hair simulation shader, GPU accelerated hair simulation, software to render hair using mannequin technique, hair shading, hair lighting, scattering, specular reflection, hair physics, tessellation, strand smoothing, spline interpolation, and real-time adjustment of color, frizz, volume, style length and physics
  - Geometry shader for hair volume
  - NURBS based geometry for hair and beard, including NURB curves, B-splines and T-splines
  - 50 hair shaders
- High-dynamic-range rendering, including HDR lighting
- Lighting, including refraction, reflection, diffuse reflection, specular reflection, volumetric lighting, per-pixel lighting, and per-pixel order-independent transparency
  - Subsurface scattering, such as for skin and clothing
- Levels of detail (LOD)
- Maya software support
- Materials system, including glass rendering
- Motion capture, including facial motion capture
- Occlusion culling, including point cloud culling for imperfect shadow maps
- Particle system, including GPU accelerated particle system, particle effects, independent particles, collision handling, alpha blending, particle buffering, parallel particle updating, and individual particle adjustment of position, velocity and other properties
- Physically based rendering
- Physics simulation, including cloth simulation with real-time adjustment, water effects such as ripples, adjustable wind simulation affecting environment (such as grass) and characters (such as clothes), and GPGPU support
- Shadow generation, including shadow mapping and percentage closer filtering (PCF)
- Skin shader, including texture coordinate system, shadows, and skin lighting, including diffuse reflection, specular reflection and subsurface scattering
- Tessellation, including isoline tessellation and B-spline smoothing tessellation
- Water reflection, including screen-space reflection and cube mapping
- Texture resolutions: 2048x2048, 4096x4096, 8K by 8K
- Yebis 2 middleware for post-processing, including HDR based exposure simulation, color temperature adjustment, depth of field, bokeh, chromatic aberration, and motion blur

== Games ==
Games developed using Luminous Engine
Year	Title	Platform(s)	Ref.
2016	Final Fantasy XV	Microsoft Windows, PlayStation 4, Xbox One, Google Stadia	
2023	Forspoken	Microsoft Windows, PlayStation 5	

== Reception ==
The existence of the gaming engine surprised many critics when it was unveiled in E3 2012. Kotaku described the graphics of the game engine preview as "jaw dropping" and "stunning", and called it a real competitor to Unreal Engine 4. VG24/7 called the graphics "drop dead gorgeous". IGN cited the technology as a "hurdling leap into the future", and other reviews emphasised realistic 3D modeling of the human eye and real time rendering of graphics.

== See also ==
- List of game engines
- CryEngine
- Dunia Engine
- Fox Engine
- Panta Rhei (game engine)
- Serious Engine
- Frostbite
