= Crystal Tools =

Game engine created and used internally by Square Enix

- Developer: Square Enix
- Release: September 2007; 19 years ago
- Platform: Microsoft Windows, Nintendo Switch, PlayStation 3, PlayStation 4, Xbox 360, Wii, Wii U
- Type: Game engine
- License: Proprietary
- Website: www.square-enix.com/jpn/index.html

Crystal Tools is the game engine developed and used in-house by the Japanese company Square Enix. It combines standard libraries for elements such as graphics, sound and artificial intelligence while providing game developers with various authoring tools. The target systems of Crystal Tools are the PlayStation 3, the Xbox 360, Microsoft Windows and the Wii. This was decided with the intention of making cross-platform production more feasible. The idea for the engine sprang from Square Enix's desire to have a unified game development environment in order to effectively share the technology and know-how of the company's individual teams.

Crystal Tools entered development in August 2005 under the code name White Engine. It was intended for the PlayStation 3-exclusive role-playing game Final Fantasy XIII, while it was first showcased in the Final Fantasy VII technical demo for the PlayStation 3. The decision to expand Crystal Tools' compatibility to other game projects and systems marked the official project start for a company-wide engine. Development was carried out by the Research and Development Division headed by Taku Murata, which was specifically established for this purpose. As Square Enix's biggest project to date, the creation of Crystal Tools caused substantial problems in the simultaneous production of several flagship titles; various critics cited the engine as the primary cause of significant delays in the release of Final Fantasy XIII.

== Features ==
Crystal Tools is a unified game engine by Japanese developer and publisher Square Enix that combines standard libraries for graphics rendering, physics processing, motion control, cinematics, visual effects, sound, artificial intelligence and networking. Its target systems are the PlayStation 3, the Xbox 360, Microsoft Windows and the Wii. On the development side, the engine takes the form of various authoring tools focused on large-scale game projects. It encompasses a character viewer for 3D models, an effects and a cutscene editor, a previsualization tool, and a sound maker. Usage of the third-party programs Autodesk Maya, Autodesk Softimage and Adobe Photoshop is supported via plug-ins. The individual authoring tools are connected over a communications server called GRAPE2 which reads all the different data formats, processes them and gives an instant preview of the final game. The engine is highly customizable and can be expanded with new functions and tools should the need for them arise. Although Crystal Tools allows for easier cross-platform development, the differences in the target systems' video memory and microarchitecture still necessitate fine-tuning adjustments in the games, for example concerning texture sizes.

== Development ==
=== Origins ===
As a video game company with different production teams, Square had wished for its employees to efficiently share their know-how and technology even before the merger with its competitor Enix. The desire for a common development infrastructure and engine dates back to the 1997 role-playing video game Final Fantasy Tactics, which was created in the transitional period from 2D to 3D game production. Back then, the artists working on the game asked programmer Taku Murata for a fast way to check how their work would look in the final game. As the development was carried out on personal computers, the graphics were displayed on computer monitors. This looked very different from the PlayStation console's actual graphics displayed on a television screen. Initially, a faithful preview of the game's visuals was too time-consuming because all data had to be transferred from PC to console first. To evade this step, Murata created an instant preview tool. With this, he soon witnessed a boost in the artists' productivity and in the quality of their work. For 2000's Vagrant Story, the developers opted to reuse this instant preview tool rather than programming a new one from scratch. Murata and his colleagues added new functions to create a unified preview and cutscene tool tailored to the game's fully polygonal 3D graphics. With 2001's PlayOnline service, the company then made its first foray into introducing a common software for all its divisions.

After the Square Enix merger, however, the individual teams still continued to program and customize their own tools for each game, which would eventually go to waste as only their respective creators knew how to use them. With the amount of assets and tools required by the in-development Final Fantasy XII and the impending advent of the seventh console generation, a common data format for the company was proposed in 2004. It was to be developed in-house and replace general-purpose formats such as FBX and COLLADA. Realizing the goal of an engine with a common set of tools proved to be difficult, as many production teams wanted to further their own interests rather than those of the company as a whole. Select staff members from different company divisions teamed up to work on the project on a voluntary basis, but their loose organizational structure failed to yield results. Nevertheless, Murata considered this group effort a first step in the right direction. In 2005, he was appointed general manager of the newly formed Technology Division. Although this enabled Murata and his subordinates to talk about a company-wide engine more extensively, the lack of manpower again prevented any significant achievements.

=== Version 1.0 ===
Following the public's positive reaction to the graphics of the Final Fantasy VII Technical Demo for PS3 presented at the Electronic Entertainment Expo in 2005, it was decided to release the role-playing video game Final Fantasy XIII on the PlayStation 3 rather than the PlayStation 2 as originally planned. That August, the Technology Division began working on the White Engine, a PlayStation 3 engine that was supposed to be exclusively used for XIII. Eight months later, however, it was decided to repurpose the engine to further make it compatible with other projects such as the action RPG Final Fantasy Versus XIII (later rebranded and repurposed into Final Fantasy XV) and the massively multiplayer online role-playing game (MMORPG) Final Fantasy XIV. In order for the company to stay competitive in a multi-platform environment, support of the engine was extended from the PlayStation 3 to the Xbox 360 and Microsoft Windows, both of which were successful in Western markets. This marked the official development start of a company-wide engine for whose purpose the Technology Division was expanded into the Research and Development Division in September 2006. Murata remained the division's general manager with a full-time staff at his disposal.

During development of Crystal Tools, the Research and Development Division continually surveyed what types of tools were needed to create Square Enix's flagship titles. Among the most frequently requested features was an extensive use of character close-ups. This made the staff realize that the Final Fantasy series put great emphasis on the "anime-like coolness" of its characters. Consequently, the engine's developers focused on attractive visuals rather than on accurate physics. To achieve a stylized look, a post-processing filter for additional lighting, blur, and visual effects was implemented. Square Enix's large teams were typically composed of a mix of industry veterans and rookie game developers. To accommodate this, the graphical user interface of the engine became another main feature and was designed to be as intuitive as possible. The large investments into technology and human resources quickly made the White Engine the company's biggest project to date. After one year of work, version 1.0 of the engine was completed in September 2007.

=== Version 1.1 and later ===
Crystal Tools in 2009

After version 1.0 had been finished, the engine's code name White Engine was changed to the official title Crystal Tools. This was not only done to represent the company and its works better, but also due to the refractive effects of real-life crystals that were meant to symbolize the flexibility of the engine. Over the next few months, the programmers advanced the engine to version 1.1 and added preliminary support for the Wii. In September 2011, Final Fantasy Versus XIII director Tetsuya Nomura and his team replaced Crystal Tools with a proprietary action game engine that was supplemented by the lighting technology of the company's new Luminous Studio engine. Other teams, such as the staff behind Final Fantasy XIII-2, kept using and refining Crystal Tools. For Lightning Returns: Final Fantasy XIII, the engine was adjusted to make it more suitable to games with an open world design.

=== Problems ===
While Final Fantasy XIII was in production, the development of Crystal Tools caused significant problems and delays. The programmers spent much time on taking all demands from staff into account. Based on this feedback, Murata's team tried to adapt the engine to the needs of several game projects, which proved to be virtually impossible and prevented the engine's specifications from being finalized. Furthermore, as separate groups were working on the individual tools of the engine, there was no comprehensive software documentation to ensure usability and compliance. Unable to wait any longer, the Final Fantasy XIII team had no choice but to begin creating assets to keep to the game's production schedule. However, the lack of specifications resulted in these assets being incompatible with the engine. In the end, it was decided that XIII was to be the principal focus of Crystal Tools and the game's team began cooperating with the Research and Development Division more closely to receive the required tools and specifications. While preliminary support of Crystal Tools was developed for the Wii, the console did not fully support all components. In 2008, Murata said that Square Enix might license the engine out to other companies at some point in the future, although the limited documentation and the impracticality of supporting licensees posed great problems in doing so. Two years later, the game's producer Yoshinori Kitase stated that developing an engine from scratch to go with a new game may have been a mistake and a likely cause for the long period between the title's announcement and release.

== Reception ==
At the time of Final Fantasy XIII's release, Crystal Tools was met with praise from critics. Eurogamer's Richard Leadbetter described it as an "excellent 3D engine". Nate Lanxon of Wired UK felt that it produced "some of the most breath taking cutscenes and 3D graphics" seen on the Xbox 360 and that it made "lengthy cutscenes more movie-like than ever". Writing for RPGFan, Stephen Harris called Crystal Tools an "impressive software" that "powered the jaw dropping visuals in Final Fantasy XIII". As time passed on, however, various media outlets criticized Square Enix for building their own engine. GameZone's James Wynne saw Crystal Tools as a means of "combusting money" during its development, and said it was "fairly out of date" by the time it had matured enough to be used for the company's projects. GamesRadar's Ashley Reed faulted Crystal Tools for leading to extended delays in the company's release schedule and even lowering the quality of some games. She blamed the engine for having caused a "catastrophic meltdown" for Final Fantasy XIV. Reed also noted that because Final Fantasy XIII had been prioritized in Crystal Tools' development, the engine struggled with the open-world environments of Versus XIII. Harris said that people had come to expect "pretty" graphics from Crystal Tools and that Final Fantasy XIV simultaneously "met and completely shattered" those expectations. He felt that the game was "the most visually astounding MMORPG ever created on the PC platform". However, he called certain graphical features "resource hogs" and was disappointed with the "steep" hardware requirements recommended by Square Enix to run the game. RPGFan's staff writer Derek Heemsbergen said that Lightning Returns: Final Fantasy XIII could be seen as "a desperate attempt to squeeze one last game out of the aging graphical engine". Wynne equally panned Square Enix's alleged decision to drop Crystal Tools in favor of the newly developed Luminous Studio engine.

== Games using Crystal Tools ==
Title	Year	Platform
Final Fantasy XIII	2009	PlayStation 3, Xbox 360, Microsoft Windows
Final Fantasy XIV	2010	Microsoft Windows
Final Fantasy XIII-2	2011	PlayStation 3, Xbox 360, Microsoft Windows
Dragon Quest X	2012	Wii, Wii U, Microsoft Windows, PlayStation 4, Nintendo Switch
Lightning Returns: Final Fantasy XIII	2013	PlayStation 3, Xbox 360, Microsoft Windows
