= Taku Murata =

Video game programmer

Taku Murata (村田 琢, Murata Taku) is a video game programmer working for Square Enix (formerly Square), as well as the general manager of the research and development division of the company. He was born in 1965 and joined Square in 1991. He is most notable as the main programmer for Final Fantasy Tactics and Vagrant Story. He also worked on the development of the PlayOnline service. Murata also helped promote a new proprietary cross platform game development tool called Crystal Tools. His latest work was on Final Fantasy XII as the programming supervisor of the game.

== Biography ==
=== Games ===
During the creation of Vagrant Story, Murata and other team members decided that a "real time 3D" was the way to go, though the scale of the game and the heightened expectations that came with it made him feel "uneasy".

Later, while supervising development on Final Fantasy XII, he stated that development and innovation became such a protracted affair that the game was in danger of being technically obsolete upon release, so 70% of their staff was assigned to improve the quality of the game's art assets. In this way, each of the three development priorities (innovation, quality and volume) were all held together, though innovation remained top priority.

=== Crystal Tools ===
Beginning in 2004, Square Enix decided there was a need to create a common 3D data format, and as a result a Research and Development Division was established in September 2006. At the 2007 Game Developers Conference, Murata noted that the development team was using proprietary software to allow "real time display" of PlayStation 2 output to a television to see immediately and precisely how a game would look. At the Game Developers Conference 2008, Murata did a presentation called "The Technology of Final Fantasy" during which he revealed that they had been working on a PlayStation 3 exclusive game development engine called "White Engine", and it had already reached Version 1.0. He also announced that Version 1.1, or Crystal Tools, was finished in September 2007. Murata later said in an interview that White Engine was meant to be a code name, and they wanted to have an official name that had something to do with Square Enix, and Crystal both sounded right and reflected "many different colors". Finishing his 2008 speech, he stated that the technology would be used on Xbox 360, PlayStation 3, PC and a "scaled down" version for the Wii, and that Final Fantasy XIII, Final Fantasy Versus XIII, and a new MMORPG would both make use of the technology. The developers working with the engine, in keeping with the Final Fantasy style, requested many closeups and stylization of characters. When asked if Square might license the engine to other companies to develop games with, he stated that Squares focus was elsewhere, and that there was not yet enough documentation to do that.

== Games ==
- Secret of Mana: Boss character algorithms
- Seiken Densetsu 3: Boss character algorithms, maps, world maps
- Final Fantasy Tactics: Main programmer
- Vagrant Story: Main programmer
- Final Fantasy XII: Technical supervisor
- Final Fantasy III (Nintendo DS version): Special thanks
