= Chiho Torii =

Japanese volleyball player (born 1970)

Personal information
- Born: 29 July 1970 (age 56); Nagaokakyo, Kyoto, Japan
- Height: 1.80 m (5 ft 11 in)

Volleyball information
- Position: Middle blocker
- Number: 6

National team
1996	Japan

Chiho Torii (鳥居 千穂, Torii Chiho) (born 29 July 1970) is a Japanese former volleyball player who competed in the 1996 Summer Olympics in Atlanta.

In 1996, Torii was eliminated with the Japanese team in the preliminary round of the Olympic tournament.
