= Square Enix =

Japanese entertainment company

Square Enix Holdings Co., Ltd.

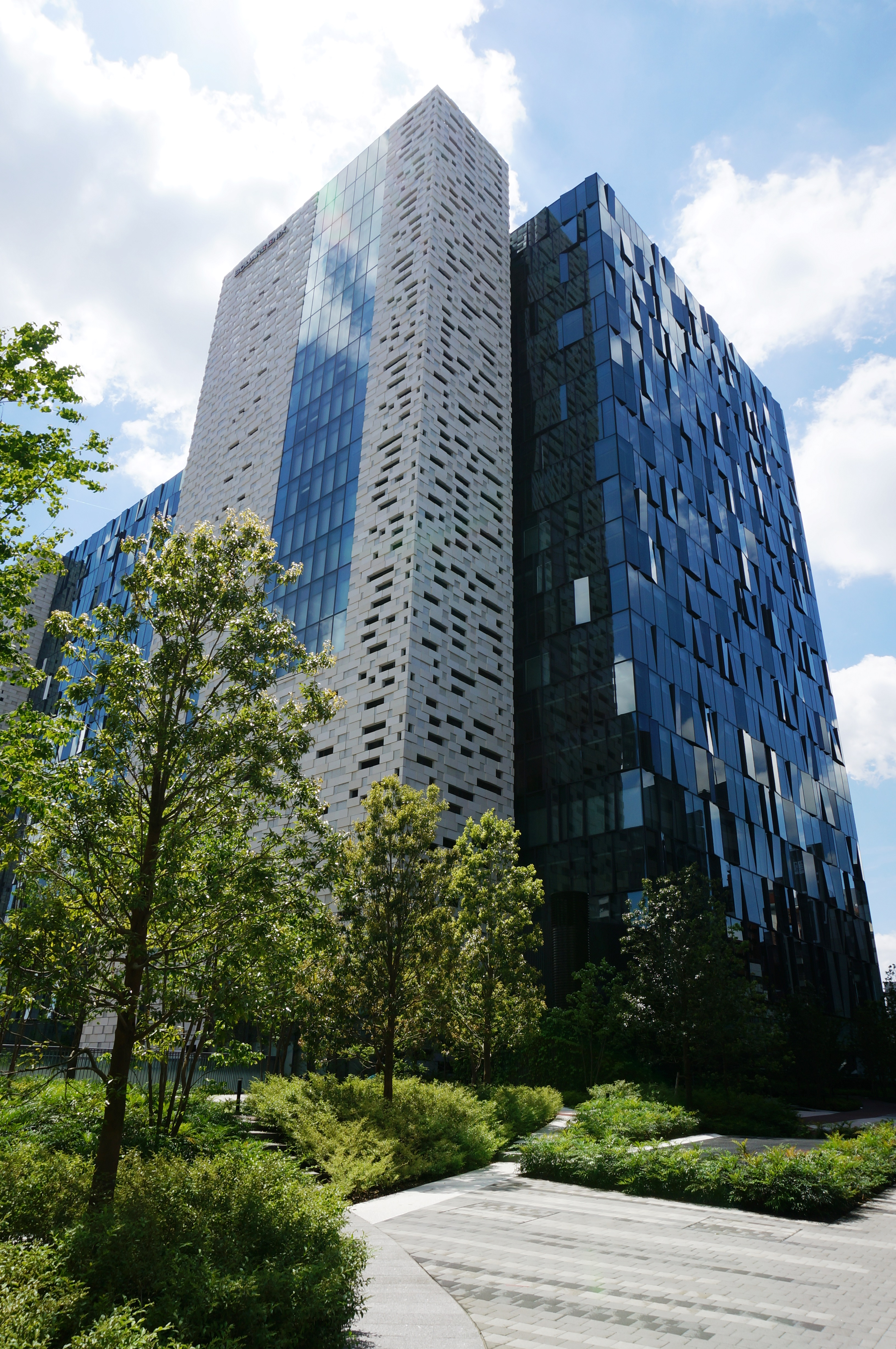
- Global headquarters in Shinjuku, Tokyo
- Native name: 株式会社スクウェア・エニックス・ホールディングス
- Romanized name: Kabushiki-gaisha Sukuwea Enikkusu Hōrudingusu (K.K. Square Enix Holdings)
- Formerly: Square Enix Co., Ltd. (2003–2008)
- Type: Public
- Traded as: TYO: 9684
- Industry: Entertainment
- Predecessors: Enix Corporation; Square Co., Ltd.
- Founded: April 1, 2003; 23 years ago (Note: Date of merger and emergence of Square Enix. Date of founding on website backdated to foundation of Enix on September 22, 1975 (the surviving company of the 2003 merger).)
- Headquarters: Shinjuku Eastside Square; Shinjuku, Tokyo, Japan
- Key people: Yasuhiro Fukushima (honorary chairman); Takashi Kiryu (president); Yoshinori Kitase (director); Yu Miyake (director)
- Products: Arcade facilities; Manga; Merchandise; Video games; Publishing
- Revenue: ▲¥365,3 billion (2022)
- Operating income: 32,759,000,000 yen (2020)
- Net income: ▲¥26.94 billion (2021)
- Total assets: 302,634,000,000 yen (2020)
- Owner: Yasuhiro Fukushima (19.80%)
- Number of employees: 4,290 (2026/03)
- Subsidiaries: § Subsidiaries
- Website: hd.square-enix.com/eng/; square-enix.com

Square Enix Holdings Co., Ltd. (Note: Japanese: 株式会社スクウェア・エニックス・ホールディングス, Hepburn: Kabushiki gaisha Sukuwea Enikkusu Hōrudingusu) is a Japanese multinational holding company, video game developer, publisher, and entertainment conglomerate. It releases role-playing game franchises, such as Final Fantasy, Kingdom Hearts, and Dragon Quest among numerous others. Outside of video game publishing and development, it is also in the business of merchandise, arcade facilities, and manga publication under its Gangan Comics brand.

The original Square Enix Co., Ltd. was formed in April 2003 from a merger between Square and Enix, with the latter as the surviving company. Each share of Square's common stock was exchanged for 0.85 shares of Enix's common stock. At the time, 80% of Square Enix staff were made up of former Square employees. As part of the merger, former Square president Yoichi Wada was appointed the president of the new corporation, while former Enix president Keiji Honda was named vice president. Yasuhiro Fukushima, the largest shareholder of the combined corporation and founder of Enix, became chairman. In October 2008, Square Enix conducted a company split between its corporate business and video game operations, reorganizing itself as the holding company Square Enix Holdings Co., Ltd., while its internally domestic video game operations were formed under the subsidiary Square Enix Co., Ltd. The group operates American, Chinese and European branches, based in Los Angeles, Beijing, Paris, Hamburg, and London respectively.

Several of Square Enix's franchises have sold over 10 million copies worldwide after 2020, with Final Fantasy selling 212 million, Dragon Quest selling 97 million, and Kingdom Hearts shipping 36 million. In 2005, Square Enix acquired arcade corporation Taito. In 2009, Square Enix acquired Eidos plc, the parent company of British game publisher Eidos Interactive, which was then absorbed into its European branch. Square Enix is headquartered at the Shinjuku Eastside Square Building in Shinjuku, Tokyo, along with offices at Shibuya and Osaka. It has over 5,000 employees worldwide through its base operations and subsidiaries.

== Corporate history ==
=== Origins and pre-merger (1975–2003) ===
==== Enix (1975–2003) ====
Enix was founded on September 22, 1975, as Eidansha Boshu Service Center by Japanese architect-turned-entrepreneur Yasuhiro Fukushima. Enix focused on publishing games, often by companies who exclusively partnered with the company. In the 1980s, in a partnership with developers Chunsoft, the company began publishing the Dragon Quest series of console games.

Key members of the developer's staff consisted of director Koichi Nakamura, writer Yuji Horii, artist Akira Toriyama, and composer Koichi Sugiyama, among others. The first game, Dragon Quest, in the Famicom-based RPG series, was released in 1986 and would eventually sell 1.5 million copies in Japan, establishing Dragon Quest as the company's most profitable franchise. Despite the announcement that Enix's long-time competitor Square would develop exclusively for PlayStation, Enix announced in January 1997 that it would release games for both Nintendo and Sony consoles. This caused a significant rise in stock for both Enix and Sony. By November 1999, Enix was listed in the Tokyo Stock Exchange's first section, indicating it as a "large company".

==== Square (1983–2003) ====
Square was started in October 1983 by Masafumi Miyamoto as a computer game software division of Den-Yu-Sha, a power line construction company owned by his father. While at the time, game development was usually conducted by only one programmer, Miyamoto believed that it would be more efficient to have graphic designers, programmers and professional story writers working together.

In September 1986, the division was spun off into an independent company led by Miyamoto, officially named Square Co., Ltd. After releasing several unsuccessful games for the Famicom, Square relocated to Ueno, Tokyo in 1987 and developed Final Fantasy, a role-playing video game inspired by Enix's success in the genre with the 1986 Dragon Quest. Final Fantasy was a success with over 400,000 copies sold, and it became Square's leading franchise, spawning dozens of games in a series that continues to the present.

Buoyed by the success of their Final Fantasy franchise, Square developed notable games and franchises such as SaGa, Mana, Front Mission, Chrono, Kingdom Hearts (in collaboration with The Walt Disney Company), and Super Mario RPG (in collaboration with Nintendo). By late 1994 they had developed a reputation as a producer of high-quality role-playing video games. Square was one of the many companies that had planned to develop and publish its games for the Nintendo 64, but with the cheaper costs associated with developing games on CD-based consoles such as the Sega Saturn and the PlayStation, Square decided to develop titles for the latter system. Final Fantasy VII was one of these games, and it sold 9.8 million copies, making it the second-best-selling game for the PlayStation.

=== Merger (2003) ===
A merger between Square and Enix had been considered since at least 2000; the financial failure in 2001 of Square's first film, Final Fantasy: The Spirits Within, made Enix reluctant to proceed while Square suffered record losses. With the company facing its second year of financial losses, Square approached Sony for a capital injection, and on October 8, 2001, Sony purchased an 18.6% stake in Square. Following the success of both Final Fantasy X and Kingdom Hearts, the company's finances stabilized, and it recorded the highest operating margin in its history in the fiscal year 2002. It was announced on November 25, 2002, that Square and Enix's previous plans to merge were to officially proceed, intending to decrease development costs and to compete with foreign developers. As described by Square's president and CEO Yoichi Wada: "Square has also fully recovered, meaning this merger is occurring at a time when both companies are at their height."

Some shareholders expressed concerns about the merger, notably Miyamoto (the founder and largest shareholder of Square), who would find himself holding a significantly smaller percentage of the combined companies. Other criticism came from Takashi Oya of Deutsche Securities, who expressed doubts about the benefits of such a merger: "Enix outsources game development and has few in-house creators, while Square does everything by itself. The combination of the two provides no negative factors but would bring little in the way of operational synergies." Miyamoto's concerns were eventually resolved by altering the exchange ratio of the merger so that each Square share would be exchanged for 0.85 Enix shares rather than 0.81 shares, and the merger was greenlit. The merger was set for April 1, 2003, on which date the newly merged entity Square Enix came into being. At the time of the merger, 80% of Square Enix staff were made up of former Square employees. As part of the merger, former Square president Yoichi Wada was appointed the president of the new corporation, while former Enix president Keiji Honda became its vice president. The founder of Enix and the largest shareholder of the newly combined corporation, Yasuhiro Fukushima, was made its honorary chairman.

As a result of the merger, Enix was the surviving company and Square Co., Ltd. was dissolved. In July of that year, the Square Enix headquarters were moved to Yoyogi, Shibuya, Tokyo, to help combine the two companies.

=== Post-merger and acquisitions (2003–2013) ===
To strengthen its wireless market, Square Enix acquired mobile application developer UIEvolution in March 2004, which was sold in December 2007, and the company instead founded its own Square Enix MobileStudio in January 2008 to focus on mobile products. In January 2005, Square Enix founded Square Enix China, expanding its interests in the People's Republic of China.

In September 2005, Square Enix bought the gaming developer and publisher Taito, renowned for their arcade hits such as Space Invaders and the Bubble Bobble series; Taito's home and portable console games divisions were merged into Square Enix itself by March 2010. In August 2008, Square Enix made plans for a similar expansion by way of a friendly takeover of video game developer Tecmo by purchasing shares at a 30 percent premium, but Tecmo rejected the proposed takeover. Tecmo would later merge with Koei in April 2009 to form Koei Tecmo. In April 2007, Square Enix Ltd. CEO John Yamamoto also became CEO of Square Enix, Inc. In 2008–2009, Square Enix was reportedly working with Grin on a Final Fantasy spin-off codenamed Fortress. The project was allegedly canceled by Square Enix after introducing seemingly impossible milestones and without payments made, resulting in Grin declaring bankruptcy and its co-founders blaming Square Enix for being "betrayed". On January 8, 2009, Square Enix signed an agreement with Ubisoft where the former would work to assist the latter in distributing its video games in Japan.

In February 2009, Square Enix announced a takeover deal for Eidos (formerly SCi Entertainment), the holding company for Eidos Interactive. The UK-based publisher's assets include Tomb Raider, Hitman, Deus Ex, Thief, and Legacy of Kain franchises, along with subsidiary development studios Crystal Dynamics, Eidos-Montréal and IO Interactive that developed the games. The acquisition of Eidos was completed in April 2009, and in November it was merged with Square Enix's European publishing organization, business unit Square Enix Europe. Eidos' US operations were merged with Square Enix Incorporated. In April 2010, a new Japanese label for Western games bearing CERO restrictions called Square Enix Extreme Edges was announced. In July 2010, Mike Fischer was appointed CEO of Square Enix, Inc. Square Enix founded the mobile development studio Hippos Lab in March 2011 and Square Enix Montréal in 2012. In May 2011, VG24/7 reported Stainless Games had purchased the rights to Carmageddon from Square Enix. In July 2011, it was reported that Square Enix closed its Los Angeles Studio. In January 2012, Square Enix North American office could pursue smaller niche, mobile and social media games due to its existing revenue streams. In October 2012, Square Enix was perceived as a "force in mobile" games by Kotaku. The price of Final Fantasy Dimensions and Demons' Score, $30 and $44 respectively, was criticized.

=== Restructuring (2013) ===
On March 26, 2013, citing sluggish sales of major Western games, Square Enix announced major restructuring, expected loss of ¥10 billion and resignation of President Yoichi Wada, whom Yosuke Matsuda replaced. Phil Rogers was elected as a new director, among others. With the restructuring, Square Enix of America CEO Mike Fischer left the company in May, with former Square Enix Europe CEO Phil Rogers becoming CEO of Americas and Europe. Further executive changes at Square Enix Western studios were mentioned in a statement. Square Enix Europe was hit with layoffs and Life President Ian Livingstone departed from the company in September 2013.

It said with the fiscal year report in March 2013, sales of Tomb Raider (2013) and Hitman: Absolution were weak, despite critical acclaim. The North American sales force was said to be ineffective and price pressure was intense. Matsuda noted the long development time of its important games and said it needs to shift to a business model with frequent customer interactions, noting Kickstarter as an example.

=== Post-restructuring and RPG development (2013–2021) ===
In March 2013, Square Enix India opened in Mumbai; however the office was closed in April 2014 and reopened five years later. As well as Square Enix Latin America in Mexico, which was closed in 2015. A mobile studio called Smileworks was founded in Indonesia in June 2013; however it was closed in January 2015. In 2014, Square Enix Collective launched, an indie developer service provider headed by Phil Elliot. Also in 2014, Square Enix signed a strategic alliance and cooperation with Japanese and French video game companies, Bandai Namco Entertainment and Ubisoft; it has served as the Japanese publisher of video games and crossover productions since 2009.

In March 2014, following the success of Bravely Default, Square Enix said it will "go back to their roots" and focus on creating content that will appeal to its core audience. Karl Stewart, vice president of strategic marketing at Square Enix for North America and Europe, left the company that month. In 2015, Square created a new studio known as Tokyo RPG Factory to develop what was then dubbed Project Setsuna. Around 2015, Square Enix's Western divisions began "officially working across LA and London".

In January 2017, Norwegian studio Artplant purchased former Eidos franchise Project I.G.I. On February 21, 2017, the formation of a new studio Studio Istolia was announced. The studio, headed by Hideo Baba, would be working on the new RPG Project Prelude Rune. In November 2017, IO Interactive conducted a management buyout from Square Enix and the Hitman IP was transferred to the studio. In September 2018, COO Mike Sherlock died, with Square Enix's executive team assuming his immediate responsibilities. In 2018, Square Enix branded its third party publishing division Square Enix External Studios, which is headed by Jon Brooke and Lee Singleton. John Heinecke was appointed as CMO for Americas and Europe in October 2018.

Baba departed the studio in early 2019, and shortly after this, Studio Istolia was closed, and Project Prelude Rune cancelled following an assessment of the project, with its staff being reassigned to different projects within the company. In 2019, Square Enix opened an Indian office again, now in Bangalore, which expanded into publishing mobile games for the Indian market in 2021. In June 2020, Square Enix donated $2.4 million to charities around its Western studios and offices for the Black Lives Matter cause and COVID-19, which were partially raised from sales of its discounted Square Enix Eidos Anthology bundle. In March 2021, Forever Entertainment, a Polish studio, was reported to be working to bring several of Square Enix's properties to modern systems. A new mobile studio called Square Enix London Mobile, working on Tomb Raider Reloaded and an unannounced title based on Avatar: The Last Airbender with Navigator Games, was announced on October 20, 2021.

=== Divestment of studios and business changes (2022–present) ===
In March 2022, Square Enix announced that it would donate $500,000 to the United Nations fund for Ukrainian refugees in the Russian invasion of Ukraine.

On May 1, 2022, Square Enix announced that it would sell several assets of subsidiary Square Enix Limited to Swedish games holding company Embracer Group for $300 million. This included studios Crystal Dynamics, Eidos-Montréal, and Square Enix Montreal, IPs Deus Ex, Legacy of Kain, Thief, and Tomb Raider and rights to "over 50 games". Square Enix stated that the sale will further help it in investment into blockchain and other technologies, and to "assist the company in adapting to the changes underway in the global business environment by establishing a more efficient allocation of resources". Square Enix also stated that it would retain the Life Is Strange, Outriders, and Just Cause franchises. However, during the Japanese publisher's full-year financial results briefing on May 13, president Yosuke Matsuda clarified the past statement and said the money from the sale will be used to strengthen the company's core games business. On July 25, 2022, Square Enix launched the English version of Manga Up!. The acquisition was closed by August 26, 2022, with the assets being held under CDE Entertainment which is headed from London by Phil Rogers, former CEO of Square Enix Americas and Europe.

In the company's financial statement for the following quarter, released in September 2022, Matsuda said it was moving away from outright owning studios due to rising costs of development, but were looking at means to invest in studios such as joint ventures or investment opportunities. In 2022, Square Enix invested in seven business strategic cooperations in the blockchain and cloud services such as Zebedee (United States), Blocklords (Estonia), Cross The Ages (France), Blacknut (France), Animoca Brands-owned The Sandbox (Australia and Hong Kong), and Ubitus (Japan).

On February 28, 2023, Square Enix Holdings announced that on May 1, Luminous Productions would reorganize and merge with Square Enix internally, citing the merging of the two would "enhance the group's abilities to develop HD games" for the 20th anniversary. On March 3, Square Enix issued a statement announcing a proposed change to the position of its president and representative director that, if implemented, would result in Yosuke Matsuda stepping down and being succeeded by Takashi Kiryu, who is presently the company's director. The change will become effective upon approval at the company's 43rd annual shareholders' meeting, which is planned for June 2023, and the board meeting which will follow ahead on the 20th anniversary of the merger. Kiryu succeeded on May 18 and was seen as part of the Final Fantasy XVI launch event as one of his first appearances in public.

In March 2024, Square Enix announced it would be more selective with the games it develops, resulting in numerous unannounced titles being cancelled. The company lost ¥22.1 billion (approximately $140 million) due to "content abandonment", it is now making the third installment of the Final Fantasy VII Remake its full focus after the release of Rebirth.

On July 10, 2026, Square Enix announced that the Extreme Edges label for Japan would be shut down, citing that western titles are now accepted in Japan, thus negating the necessity of a separate label for such titles.

== Corporate structure ==
On October 1, 2008, Square Enix transformed into a holding company and was renamed Square Enix Holdings. At the same time, the development and publishing businesses were transferred to a spin-off company named Square Enix, sharing the same corporate leadership and offices with the holding company. The primary offices for Square Enix and Square Enix Holdings are in the Shinjuku Eastside Square Building in Shinjuku, Tokyo.

Currently, focusing in different industries, the company is divided as the following: Five Creative Business Units for game development and production in Square Enix Co., Ltd; a dedicated publishing business unit for manga and books publishing; a digital storefront business division for its e-Store and merchandise production; its media and arts business unit for music production, concert and live performance coordination, and visual contents production (live action, animation, and CG for TV, movies, and games); and a blockchain business division.

=== Development organization ===
After the merger in 2003, Square Enix's development department was organized into eight Square and two Enix Product Development Divisions (開発事業部, kaihatsu jigyōbu), each focused on different groupings of games. The divisions were spread around different offices; for example, Product Development Division 5 had offices both in Osaka and Tokyo.

According to Yoichi Wada, the development department was reorganized away from the Product Development Division System by March 2007 into a project-based system. Until 2013, the teams in charge of the Final Fantasy and Kingdom Hearts series were still collectively referred to as the 1st Production Department (第1制作部, dai-ichi seisakubu). The 1st Production Department was formed from the fall 2010 combination of Square Enix's Tokyo and Osaka development studios, with Shinji Hashimoto as its corporate executive.

In December 2013, Square Enix's development was restructured into 12 Business Divisions. In 2017, Business Division 9 was merged into Business Division 8, while Business Divisions 11 and 12 merged to become the new Business Division 9, while a new Business Division 11 was created with some staff from Business Division 6.

In 2019, Square Enix announced that all of its Business Divisions would be consolidated into four Creative Business Units. Creative Business Unit 1 was led by Yoshinori Kitase, Creative Business Unit 2 was led by Yu Miyake, Creative Business Unit 3 was led by Naoki Yoshida and Creative Business Unit 4 was led by Kei Hirono.

In April 2024, Square Enix restructured its development operations moving away from the Creative Business Unit structure into a new Creative Studio structure where it develops, produces and oversees projects. They also sometimes collaborate with each other on projects such as Creative Studios 4 and 5 regularly working together on Dragon Quest projects.

- Creative Studio 1 is led by executive officer Yoshinori Kitase and studio head Naoki Hamaguchi. They are responsible for various projects including the Final Fantasy VII Remake series and the Kingdom Hearts series.
- Creative Studio 2 is led by executive officer and studio head Yoshinori Kitase and deputy studio heads Motomu Toriyama and Shinpei Yashima. They are responsible for various projects including Final Fantasy and SaGa titles. All 3 studio heads also have lead roles on the Final Fantasy VII Remake series.
- Creative Studio 3 is led by executive officer and studio head Naoki Yoshida. They are responsible for the Final Fantasy MMORPGs Final Fantasy XI and Final Fantasy XIV and titles such as Final Fantasy XVI and Final Fantasy Tactics: The Ivalice Chronicles.
- Creative Studio 4 is led by executive officer Yosuke Saito and studio head Takeshi Nozue. They are responsible for mainline Dragon Quest games including Dragon Quest X Online and Dragon Quest XII.
- Creative Studio 5 is led by executive officer Yosuke Saito, studio head Tomoya Asano and deputy studio head Masashi Takahashi. They are responsible for various series and projects including Bravely Default, Octopath Traveler, Nier, Mana, Star Ocean, Romancing SaGa and Paranormasight as well as Dragon Quest remakes and spin-offs, focusing primarily on smaller and medium sized console titles, with heavy reliance on external development handled by contracted studios.
- Creative Studio 7 is led by studio head Yu Miyake, dedicated to producing mobile games developed by external studios contracted by the company, such as Dissidia Duellum Final Fantasy and Dragon Quest Smash/Grow.

=== Business model ===
The business model of post-merger Square Enix is centered on the idea of "polymorphic content", which consists of developing franchises on multiple potential media rather than being restricted by a single gaming platform. An early example of this strategy is Enix's Fullmetal Alchemist manga series, which has been adapted into two anime television series, five movies (two animated, three live-action), and several novels and video games. Other polymorphic projects include the Compilation of Final Fantasy VII, Code Age, World of Mana, Ivalice Alliance, and Fabula Nova Crystallis Final Fantasy subseries. According to Yoichi Wada, "It's very difficult to hit the jackpot, as it were. Once we've hit it, we have to get all the juice possible out of it". Similar to Sony's Greatest Hits program, Square Enix also re-releases its best-selling games at a reduced price under a label designated "Ultimate Hits".

The standard game design model Square Enix employs is to establish the plot, characters, and art of the game first. Battle systems, field maps, and cutscenes are created next. According to Taku Murata, this process became the company's model for development after the success of Square's Final Fantasy VII in 1997. The team size for Final Fantasy XIII peaked at 180 artists, 30 programmers, and 36 game designers, but analysis and restructuring were done to outsource large-scale development in the future.

== Business ==
=== Video games and franchises ===
Square Enix's primary concentration is on video gaming, and it is primarily known for its role-playing video game franchises. Of its properties, the Final Fantasy franchise, begun in 1987, is the best-selling, with worldwide sales exceeding 173 million units as of March 2022. The Dragon Quest franchise, whose first title was introduced in 1986, is also a best-seller; it is considered one of the most popular game series in Japan and has sold over 85 million units globally. More recently, the Kingdom Hearts series (developed in collaboration with Disney beginning in 2002) has become popular, with 36 million units shipped as of March 2022. Other popular series developed by Square Enix include the SaGa series with nearly 10 million copies sold since 1989, the Mana series with over 6 million sales since 1991, and the Chrono series with over 5 million sold since 1995. In addition to its sales numbers, many Square Enix games have been highly acclaimed by critics; 27 Square Enix games were included in Famitsu magazine's 2006 "Top 100 Games Ever", with 7 of them making the top 10 and Final Fantasy X claiming the number 1 position. The company also won IGN's award for Best Developer of 2006 for the PlayStation 2.

Square and Enix initially targeted Nintendo home consoles with its games, but Square Enix currently develops games for a wide variety of systems. In the seventh generation of video game consoles, Square Enix released new installments from its major series across all three major systems, including Final Fantasy XIII on both the PlayStation 3 and Xbox 360 and Dragon Quest X on the Wii. Square Enix has also developed titles for handheld game consoles, including the Game Boy Advance, Nintendo DS, PlayStation Portable, Nintendo 3DS, and PlayStation Vita. Also, it has published games for Microsoft Windows-based personal computers and various models of mobile phones and modern smartphones. Square Enix mobile phone games became available in 2004 on the Vodafone network in some European countries, including Germany, the United Kingdom, Spain, and Italy.

Before its launch, Michihiro Sasaki, senior vice president of Square Enix, spoke about the PlayStation 3, saying, "We don't want the PlayStation 3 to be the overwhelming loser, so we want to support them, but we don't want them to be the overwhelming winner either, so we can't support them too much." Square Enix continued to reiterate its devotion to multi-platform publishing in 2007, promising more support for the North American and European gaming markets where console pluralism is generally more prevalent than in Japan. Their interest in multi-platform development was made evident in 2008 when the previously PlayStation 3-exclusive game Final Fantasy XIII was announced for release on the Xbox 360.

In 2008, Square Enix released its first game for the iPod, Song Summoner: The Unsung Heroes. Square Enix made a new brand for younger children gaming that same year, known as Pure Dreams. Pure Dreams' first two games, Snoopy DS: Let's Go Meet Snoopy and His Friends! and Pingu's Wonderful Carnival, were released that year. After acquiring Eidos in 2009, Square Enix combined it with its European publishing wing to create Square Enix Europe, which continues to publish Eidos franchises such as Tomb Raider (88 million sales), Deus Ex (4 million), Thief and Legacy of Kain (3.5 million). Square Enix were served as the Japanese publisher for Activision Blizzard and Ubisoft from 2009 to 2024 (followed by the Microsoft acquisition and Ubisoft's partnership with Tencent and Sega Sammy Holdings). In May 2022, Square Enix sold several assets of Square Enix Europe $300 million to Embracer Group, including former Eidos Interactive franchises such as Tomb Raider, Deus Ex, Thief, Legacy of Kain and more than 50 others.

Square Enix owned franchises and games include:

- former Square franchises, such as Mana;
- former Enix franchises, such as Star Ocean;
- Square Enix created franchises, such as Drakengard;
- Quest franchises, such as Ogre;
- Taito franchises, such as Space Invaders;
- Retained former Crystal Dynamics franchise, such as Gex;
- Retained former Eidos Interactive franchise, such as Just Cause;
- Square Enix America created games, such as Quantum Conundrum;
- Square Enix Europe created franchises, such as Life Is Strange.

=== Game technology ===
In 2004, Square Enix began to work on a "common 3D format" that would allow the entire company to develop titles without being restricted to a specific platform: this led to the creation of a game engine named Crystal Tools, which is compatible with the PlayStation 3, the Xbox 360, Windows-based PCs, and to some extent the Wii. It was first shown off at a tech demo shown off at E3 2005 and was later used for Final Fantasy XIII based on the demo's reception. Crystal Tools was also used for Final Fantasy Versus XIII before its re-branding as Final Fantasy XV and its shift onto next-gen platforms. Refinement of the engine continued through the development of Final Fantasy XIII-2, and it underwent a major overhaul for Lightning Returns: Final Fantasy XIII. Since that release, no new titles have been announced using Crystal Tools, and it is believed that the development of the engine has halted permanently.

Luminous Engine was originally intended for eighth-generation consoles and unveiled at E3 2012 through a tech demo titled Agni's Philosophy. The first major console title to be developed with Luminous Engine was Final Fantasy XV; the engine's development was done in tandem with the game, and the game's development helped the programming team optimize the engine.

In addition, Square Enix uses commercial engines, including Epic Games' Unreal Engine 3 (such as The Last Remnant), Unreal Engine 4 (such as Dragon Quest XI, Kingdom Hearts III, Final Fantasy VII Remake) and Unity (such as I Am Setsuna, Lost Sphear, SaGa: Scarlet Grace).

=== Online gaming ===
Before the merger, Enix published its first online game Cross Gate in Japan, mainland China, and Taiwan in 2001, and Square released Final Fantasy XI in Japan in 2002 for the PlayStation 2 and later the personal computer. With the huge success of Final Fantasy XI, the game was ported to the Xbox 360 two years later and was the first MMORPG on the console. All versions of the game used PlayOnline, a cross-platform internet gaming platform and internet service developed by Square Enix. The platform was used as the online service for many games Square Enix developed and published throughout the decade. Due to the success of its MMORPG, Square Enix began a new project called Fantasy Earth: The Ring of Dominion. GamePot, a Japanese game portal, received the license to publish Fantasy Earth in Japan, and it was released in Japan as "Fantasy Earth ZERO". In 2006, however, Square Enix dropped the Fantasy Earth Zero project and sold it to GamePot. Square Enix released Concerto Gate, the sequel to Cross Gate, in 2007.

A next-gen MMORPG code named Rapture was developed by the Final Fantasy XI team using the company's Crystal Tools engine. It was unveiled at E3 2009 as Final Fantasy XIV for PlayStation 3 and Microsoft Windows and would be released on September 30, 2010. Dragon Quest X was announced in September 2011 as an MMORPG being developed for Nintendo's Wii and Wii U consoles, which released on August 2, 2012, and March 30, 2013, respectively. Like XIV, it used Crystal Tools.

Square Enix also made browser games and Facebook games, like Legend World, Chocobo's Crystal Tower and Knights of the Crystals, and online games for Yahoo! Japan, such as Monster x Dragon, Sengoku Ixa, Bravely Default: Praying Brage, Star Galaxy, and Crystal Conquest.

=== Cloud gaming ===
In 2013, Dragon Quest X was brought to iOS and Android in Japan using NTT DoCoMo as the release platform and Ubitus for the streaming technology. In 2014, it was also brought to 3DS in Japan using Ubitus.

On May 8, 2012, Square Enix announced a collaboration with Bigpoint Games to create a free-to-play Cloud gaming platform that "throws players into 'limitless game worlds' directly through their web browser". The service was launched under the name CoreOnline in August 2012. Stating "limited commercial take-up", the service was cancelled on November 29, 2013.

In September 2014, a cloud gaming company called Shinra Technologies (previously Project Flare) was created; however, it was closed in January 2016. On October 9, 2014, Square Enix launched another online game service in Japan called Dive In, which allowed players to stream console games to their iOS or Android devices. The service was monetized by the amount of time the players spent playing, with each game offered for free for thirty minutes. The service was cancelled on September 13, 2015. Some Square Enix games are available in Japan on the G-cluster streaming service.

=== Arcade facilities ===
With the merger of Taito businesses into Square Enix, the company gained possession of Taito's arcade infrastructure and facilities and entered the arcade market in 2005. In 2010 Taito revealed NESiCAxLive, a cloud-based system of storing games and changing them through the internet instead of acquiring physical copies. This system was added to its many arcade gaming locations. The company continues to cater to the arcade audience in Japan with arcade-only titles, with game producers in 2015 stating that Square Enix has a loyal fan base that values the arcade gaming experience. In November 2019, Square Enix announced a "Ninja Tower Tokyo" theme park by its newly established Live Interactive Works division.

=== Film ===
The company has made three forays into the film industry. The first, Final Fantasy: The Spirits Within (2001), was produced by Square subsidiary Square Pictures before the Enix merger; Square Pictures is now a consolidated subsidiary of Square Enix. Its box-office failure caused Enix to delay the merger, which was already under consideration before the creation of the film until Square became profitable once again. In 2005, Square Enix released Final Fantasy VII Advent Children, a CGI-animation film based on the PlayStation game Final Fantasy VII, set two years after the events of the game. A Deus Ex film was in pre-production in 2012 and, as of 2014, was undergoing rewrites. In 2016 Square Enix revealed a film Kingsglaive: Final Fantasy XV based in the world of Final Fantasy XV and Brotherhood: Final Fantasy XV, a new web series released on YouTube and Crunchyroll.

=== Publishing ===
The company has a manga publishing division in Japan (originally from Enix) called Gangan Comics, which publishes content for the Japanese market only. In 2010, however, Square Enix launched a digital manga store for North American audiences via its Members services, which contains several notable series published in Gangan anthologies. Titles published by Gangan Comics include Fullmetal Alchemist, Soul Eater, and many others. Other titles include manga adaptations of various Square Enix games, like Dragon Quest, Kingdom Hearts, and Star Ocean. Some of these titles have also been adapted into anime series. Fullmetal Alchemist is the most successful title of Square Enix's manga branch, with more than 64 million volumes sold worldwide. It is licensed in North America by Viz Media, while its two anime adaptations were licensed by Funimation (now known as Crunchyroll) in North America. Starting in Q4 2019, Square Enix began publishing some of its manga series in English.

=== Merchandise ===
Square Enix has created merchandise for virtually all of its video game franchises. Starting in 2000, Square Enix's former online gaming portal PlayOnline sold merchandise from game franchises including Parasite Eve, Vagrant Story, Chocobo Racing, Front Mission, Chrono Cross, and Final Fantasy. Mascots from game franchises are a popular focus for merchandise, such as the Chocobo from Final Fantasy, which has been seen as a rubber duck, a plush baby Chocobo, and on coffee mugs. Square Enix also designed a Chocobo character costume for the release of Chocobo Tales. The Slime character from Dragon Quest has also been frequently used in Square Enix merchandise, especially in Japan. On the Japanese language Square Enix shopping website, there is also a Slime-focused section called "Smile Slime". Slime merchandise includes plush toys, game controllers, figurines, and several board games, including one titled Dragon Quest Slime Racing. In Japan, pork-filled steam buns shaped like slimes have been sold in 2010. For Dragon Quest's 25th anniversary, special items were sold, including business cards, tote bags, and crystal figurines. Rabites from the Mana series have appeared in several pieces of Square Enix merchandise, including plush dolls, cushions, lighters, mousepads, straps, telephone cards, and T-shirts. Square Enix has also made merchandise for third party series, including figures Mass Effect and Halo in 2012. Beginning in 2012, it operates shops called "Square Enix Cafe" in Tokyo, Osaka and Shanghai, which display and sell merchandise, as well as serve café food.

== Subsidiaries ==
Name	Became subsidiary	Location	Purpose	Ref.
Domestic
Taito Corporation	September 28, 2005	Shinjuku, Tokyo, Japan	Square Enix Holdings arcade gaming subsidiary, Space Invaders series, Bubble Bobble series, Groove Coaster series.	
Square Enix Co., Ltd.	October 1, 2008	Shinjuku, Tokyo, Japan; Osaka, Japan	Game development and publishing company, Final Fantasy series, Dragon Quest series, Kingdom Hearts series. Also referred to as Square Enix Japan.	
Square Enix Business Support, Co., Ltd.	April 1, 2010	Shinjuku, Tokyo, Japan	Operational support of group company businesses including office services, information-processing and development of arcade game machines	
Square Enix AI & Arts Alchemy Co., Ltd.	March 2, 2020	Shinjuku, Tokyo, Japan	R&D/business involving products that combine AI, computer graphics, and art.	
Hojosen Co. Ltd.	January 30, 2026	Kobe, Hyōgo, Japan	Operational support for strategic planning and execution, centered on the marketing activities of group companies.	
I-tsu-tsu Co. Ltd.	January 30, 2026	Kobe, Hyōgo, Japan	Planning, consulting, and promotion of traditional Japanese culture, including the production of shogi classes for children.	
International
Square Enix, Inc. (originally Square Soft Inc.)	March 1989	El Segundo, California, United States	American publishing and Japanese Intellectual Property localization. Founded as Square Soft, Inc. and merged in 2003 with sister subsidiaries Square USA and Electronic Arts Square to become Square Enix USA, renamed Square Enix Inc the following year. Also referred to as Square Enix America.	
Square Enix Ltd. (originally Square Europe Ltd.)	December 1998	Blackfriars, London, United Kingdom	European publishing. Contains divisions Square Enix External Studios and Square Enix Collective, and offices in Paris, France and Hamburg, Germany. Founded as Square Europe Ltd. and absorbed Eidos Interactive in 2009. Also referred to as Square Enix Europe.	
Square Enix (China) Co., Ltd.	February 28, 2005	Haidian District, Beijing, China	Chinese publishing. The successor to Square Enix Webstar Network Technology (Beijing) Co., Ltd.	
Huang Long Co., Ltd.	August 2005	China	Sale and management of online games in Asia-Pacific.	
Square Enix Pvt. Ltd. (originally Square Enix India Pvt. Ltd.)	2019	Bangalore, Karnataka, India	Mobile games publishing subsidiary for the Indian market. Also referred to as Square Enix India.	

=== Former subsidiaries ===
Name	Became subsidiary	Closed or sold	Location	Purpose/Fate	Ref.
Enix America Corporation Inc.	1990	November 1995	Redmond, Washington, United States	Enix's first American subsidiary.	
Square USA, Inc (previously Square L.A., Inc.)	August 1995	April 1, 2003	Costa Mesa, California, United States	Square Co. Ltd's American research and development studio.	
DigiCube	February 6, 1996	November 26, 2003	Tokyo, Japan	Square Co. Ltd. marketing and distribution subsidiary in Japan.	
Square Electronic Arts LLC	April 27, 1998	April 1, 2003	Costa Mesa, California, United States	A 70/30 joint venture with Electronic Arts for North American publication of Square's titles. It was folded into Square Enix's US operations after Square purchased EA's stake in the venture.	
Electronic Arts Square KK	May 1, 1998	April 1, 2003	Japan	A similar 30/70 joint-venture with Electronic Arts for Japanese publication of EA's titles. After the Square Enix merger, EA purchased Square's stake in the business and renamed it Electronic Arts Co., Ltd.	
Taito Soft Corporation (previously The Game Designers Studio)	June 22, 1999	March 11, 2010	Hirakawa-cho, 2-chome, Chiyoda-ku, Tokyo, Japan	Square Enix Co., Ltd. game development brand.	
Enix America Inc.	1999	April 1, 2003	Seattle, King County, Washington, United States	A joint venture between Enix and Eidos Interactive to publish Enix games for Western markets.	
Square Enix Webstar Network Technology (Beijing) Co., Ltd. (previously Enix Webstar Network Technology (Beijing) Co., Ltd.)	2001	February 28, 2005	Beijing, China	Enix Chinese publishing division.	
UIEvolution	March 2004	December 17, 2007	Bellevue, Washington, United States	Square Enix mobile software development division.	
Taito Art Corporation	September 28, 2005	July 28, 2008	Tokyo, Japan	Taito travel and insurance agency subsidiary.	
Taito Tech Co., Ltd.	September 28, 2005	July 28, 2008	Tokyo, Japan	Taito subsidiary for maintenance and transportation of amusement equipment.	
Smile-Lab Co., Ltd.	February 29, 2008	May 2017	Tokyo, Japan	Development and operation studio for social games and community services. Sold to the management of the studio.	
Square Enix of Europe Holdings	December 4, 2008	April 26, 2016	London, England	Holding company for the group's operations in Europe.	
Beautiful Game Studios	April 22, 2009	2013	London, United Kingdom	Square Enix Europe game development subsidiary, Championship Manager series.	
Eidos Hungary (previously Mithis Entertainment)	April 22, 2009	April 19, 2010	Budapest, Hungary	Square Enix Europe game development subsidiary.	
Eidos Interactive	April 22, 2009	November 10, 2009	Wimbledon, London, United Kingdom	Western intellectual properties publishing subsidiary. Merged with Square Enix Europe.	
IO Interactive	April 22, 2009	June 16, 2017	Copenhagen, Denmark	Square Enix Europe game development subsidiary. Sold to the management of the studio.	
Crystal Dynamics	April 22, 2009	August 26, 2022	Redwood City, California, United States	Square Enix Europe game development subsidiary. Sold to Embracer Group	
Eidos Montréal	April 22, 2009	August 26, 2022	Montréal, Quebec, Canada	Square Enix Europe game development subsidiary. Sold to Embracer Group	
Studio Onoma (previously Square Enix Montréal)	November 21, 2011	August 26, 2022	Montréal, Quebec, Canada	Square Enix Europe game development subsidiary. Sold to Embracer Group	
Hippos Lab Co., Ltd.	March 7, 2011	May 1, 2015	Tokyo, Japan	Original content mainly focusing on smartphones social games. Sold to United, Inc.	
Smileworks	June 17, 2013	January 14, 2015	Jakarta, Indonesia	iOS, Android, Windows Phone and Nokia smartphones.	
Tokyo RPG Factory	August 2014	January 31, 2024	Shinjuku, Tokyo, Japan	Square Enix Holdings Co., Ltd. game development subsidiary. Merged with Square Enix Co. Ltd.	
Shinra Technologies	September 18, 2014	January 2016	New York City, United States	Cloud services.	
Studio Istolia	February 21, 2017	May 15, 2019	Shinjuku, Tokyo, Japan	Square Enix Co., Ltd. game development subsidiary. Shut down.	
Luminous Productions	March 27, 2018	May 1, 2023	Shinjuku, Tokyo, Japan	Square Enix Holdings Co., Ltd. game development subsidiary. Merged with Square Enix Co. Ltd.	
Square Enix London Mobile	October 2021	2022	London, United Kingdom	Square Enix Europe game development subsidiary. Merged with Square Enix Montréal	
