= Black Girl Gamers =

Company and online community

Black Girl Gamers is a company and online community founded by Jay-Ann Lopez. It started as a closed Facebook group in 2015 and aims to provide a community for black women gamers. Black Girl Gamers later became a company, run by Lopez, with part-time staff.

== History ==
Black Girl Gamers was founded by Jay-Ann Lopez, a British author and blogger, in 2015. Lopez had enjoyed playing video games since she was young, but struggled to find other black women who were interested in gaming, and faced sexist and racist comments playing video games online. Aiming to create a space and community for black women to support each other while gaming, Lopez created a Facebook group called Black Girl Gamers. The Facebook group has a strict process for joining, including a questionnaire and a requirement for the member to have profile pictures of their face.

Over time, the community grew in size, hosted panels at PAX East and the Victoria and Albert Museum, and started running in-person events. Lopez received the MCV Women in Games Campaigner of the Year award in 2019. By 2020 the community had more than 6,000 members, with 20,000 followers on Twitter and 10,000 on Twitch. More than 184 team members stream on the organization's Twitch channel, which continued to grow to 35,000 followers by 2021.

In June 2020 the community organised a Wellness Week to raise funds for Color of Change and The Bail Project, and an online gaming summit in partnership with Twitch. In mid 2020, the world's rising interest in police brutality and the Black Lives Matter movement led to a surge in Twitch viewers, which received mixed reactions from the community, who tweeted "As much as we're grateful to receive new support, BGG is not a proxy for doing the work regarding police brutality."

By 2022, the company Black Girl Gamers had part-time staff, with Lopez as its CEO.

During Forspoken's development, the company provided feedback for main character Frey.

== Activities ==
Members of the Black Girl Gamers community support and play games with each other, communicating through forums such as the Facebook group. In addition, Lopez hopes that the community will improve connections between gamers and the video game industry while highlighting issues important to them.

Lopez and other members of the community stream on the group's Twitch channel. As a result of their activity on Twitch, Lopez was invited to speak at TwitchCon, though she initially struggled to gain Partner status on the website. Black Girl Gamers have also run in-person events such as a women-only gaming event called Gamer Girls Night In.

Black Girl Gamers has partnered with technology organisations including Intel to support inclusivity initiatives, run workshops, provided consulting services, and facilitated brand opportunities for streamers.
