= Chiho Murata =

Japanese shogi player (born 1984)

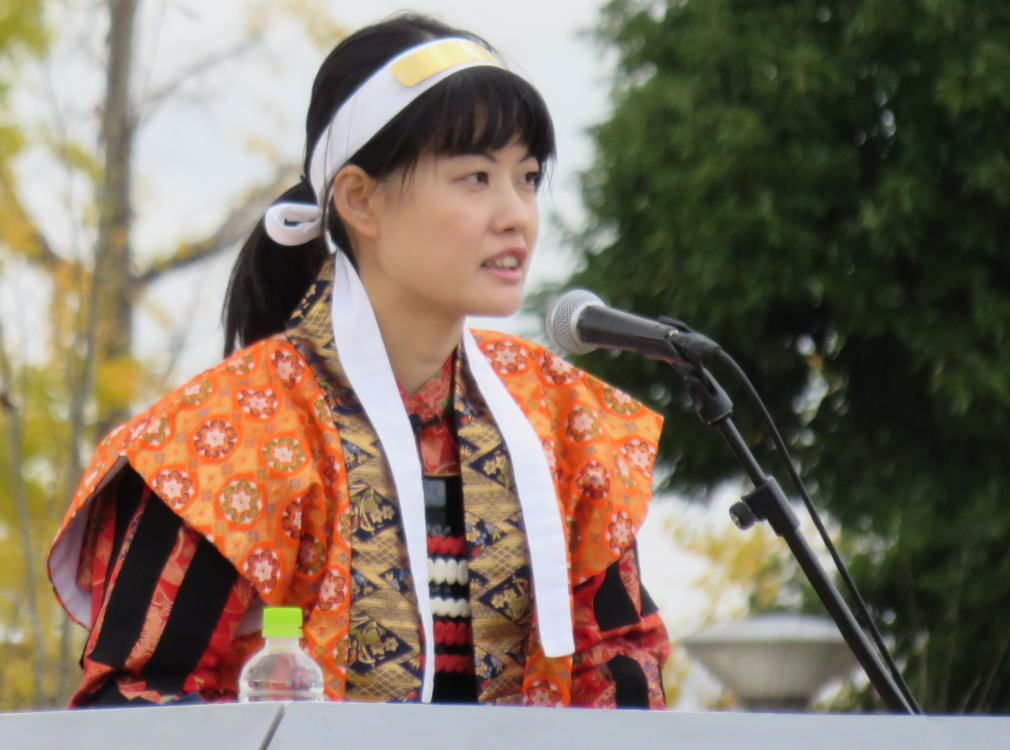
- Murata in 2015
- Native name: 村田智穂
- Born: May 1, 1984 (age 41)
- Hometown: Takasago, Hyōgo

Career
- Achieved professional status: April 1, 2002 (aged 17)
- Badge Number: W-28
- Rank: Women's 3-dan
- Teacher: Hitoshige Awaji (9-dan)

Websites
- JSA profile page

Chiho Murata (村田 智穂, Murata Chiho; born May 1, 1984) is a Japanese women's professional shogi player ranked 3-dan.

== Women's shogi professional ==
=== Promotion history ===
Murata's promotion history is as follows:

- 2-kyū: April 1, 2002
- 1-kyū: April 1, 2003
- 1-dan: April 1, 2004
- 2-dan: February 10, 2011
- 3-dan: September 13, 2024

Note: All ranks are women's professional ranks.

== Personal life ==
Murata's older brother Tomohiro is also a shogi professional. The two were the first brother and sister pair to become shogi professionals.
