= Tomohiro Murata =

Japanese shogi player

- Native name: 村田智弘
- Born: April 2, 1981 (age 44)
- Hometown: Takasago, Hyōgo

Career
- Achieved professional status: October 1, 2001 (aged 20)
- Badge Number: 242
- Rank: 7-dan
- Teacher: Hitoshige Awaji (9-dan)
- Meijin class: Free
- Ryūō class: 5

Websites
- JSA profile page

Tomohiro Murata (村田 智弘, Murata Tomohiro; born April 2, 1981) is a Japanese professional shogi player ranked 7-dan.

== Shogi professional ==
=== Promotion history ===
The promotion history for Murata is as follows:

- 6-kyū: 1993
- 1-dan: 1996
- 4-dan: October 1, 2001
- 5-dan: June 19. 2007
- 6-dan: October 23, 2008
- 7-dan: December 18, 2019
