= Final Fantasy XV =

2016 video game

- Developer: Square Enix Business Division 2 (Note: Later known as Luminous Productions)
- Publisher: Square Enix
- Director: Hajime Tabata
- Producer: Shinji Hashimoto
- Designer: Takatsugu Nakazawa
- Artists: Tetsuya Nomura; Roberto Ferrari; Yusuke Naora; Isamu Kamikokuryo
- Writers: Saori Itamuro; Akiko Ishibashi; Takumi Nishida
- Composer: Yoko Shimomura
- Series: Final Fantasy; Fabula Nova Crystallis
- Engine: Luminous Engine
- Platforms: PlayStation 4; Xbox One; Windows; Google Stadia
- Release: PlayStation 4, Xbox One; November 29, 2016; Windows; March 6, 2018; Google Stadia; November 19, 2019
- Genre: Action role-playing
- Modes: Single-player, multiplayer

Final Fantasy XV (Note: Japanese: ファイナルファンタジーXV, Hepburn: Fainaru Fantajī Fifutīn) is a 2016 action role-playing game developed and published by Square Enix. The fifteenth main installment of the Final Fantasy series, it was released for the PlayStation 4 and Xbox One in November 2016, Windows in March 2018, and as a launch title for Stadia in November 2019. The game features an open world environment and action-based battle system, incorporating quick-switching weapons, elemental magic, and other features such as vehicle travel and camping. The base campaign was later expanded with downloadable content (DLC), adding stand alone story content and further gameplay options such as additional playable characters and multiplayer.

Final Fantasy XV takes place on the fictional world of Eos; aside from Insomnia, the capital of Lucis, all the world is dominated by the empire of Niflheim, who seek control of the magical Crystal protected by the Lucian royal family. On the eve of peace negotiations, Niflheim attacks the capital and steals the Crystal. Noctis Lucis Caelum, heir to the Lucian throne, goes on a quest to rescue the Crystal and defeat Niflheim. He later learns his full role as the "True King", destined to use the Crystal's powers to save Eos from eternal darkness. The game shares a thematic connection with Fabula Nova Crystallis Final Fantasy, a subseries of games linked by a common mythos which includes Final Fantasy XIII and Final Fantasy Type-0.

The game's development began in 2006 as a PlayStation 3 spin-off titled Final Fantasy Versus XIII. (Note: ファイナルファンタジーヴェルサスXIII, Fainaru Fantajī Verusasu Sātīn) Tetsuya Nomura served as the original director and character designer. After a development period of six years, it was changed to the next mainline title in the series in 2012; Nomura was replaced as director by Hajime Tabata, and the game shifted to eighth generation platforms. Due to the changes, the story needed to be rewritten and some scenes and characters were repurposed or removed. The setting of Final Fantasy XV was "a fantasy based on reality", with locations and creatures based on elements from the real world.

To supplement the game, Square Enix created a multimedia project called the "Final Fantasy XV Universe", which includes a few spin-off games, as well as an anime series and a feature film. Gameplay and story-based DLC was released between 2017 and 2019. Upon release, Final Fantasy XV was well received by critics. Widespread praise was given for its gameplay, visuals and soundtrack, while reception towards its story and presentation was mixed. As of May 2022, the game has sold ten million units worldwide, making it one of the best-selling Final Fantasy games of all time.

== Gameplay ==
Final Fantasy XV is an open world action role-playing game where players take control of protagonist Noctis Lucis Caelum during his journey across the world of Eos. While accompanied by his three companions Gladiolus, Ignis and Prompto, Noctis is the only character directly controlled by the player: he can navigate through movement, jump over small obstacles, sprint for a limited time, and perform context-based actions such as taking cover behind objects. The kingdom of Lucis is a large connected landmass that can be explored on foot, by using the party's car "Regalia", or chocobos, recurring galliform birds in the Final Fantasy series. Both the Regalia and chosen Chocobos can be customised by the player, and Chocobos can join in battles if their connection to the characters is strong enough. While Chocobos are controlled manually, the Regalia can be either manually or automatically controlled. The party can also fast-travel to areas unlocked on the world map. The Regalia must be refueled periodically at petrol stations. In towns the party can visit, there are inns and hotels where they can stay, shops where items and equipment can be purchased with the in-game currency gil, and local tipsters, non-playable characters (NPCs) who provide information on quests, from main story missions to side quests. Side quests are also available from individual NPCs found in towns. During some story sequences, dialogue choices appear for Noctis, with the selected option altering the response from NPCs. The game also contains two difficulty modes, with players being able to freely switch between the two.

=== Battle system ===
The Active Cross Battle system in action, showing Noctis attacking a hostile soldier in one of the game's environments

The game uses an action-based real-time battle system, called the Active Cross Battle system. Instead of using a menu interface, the player selects commands directly mapped to buttons on the controller, such as "Attack", "Defend", and "Item". Battles take place within the current environment rather than transitioning to a separate arena, and can range from open plains to enclosed building interiors. When approaching enemies, a threat meter appears on the top of the screen, growing in intensity the closer the party gets to the enemy. When the party gets close and attacks or is detected, the battle begins. Running away from enemies and out of the combat zone in normal battles ends combat. During battle, each character has health points (HP), and Noctis also has magic points (MP). HP is depleted whenever a character is attacked, while Noctis's MP recovers over time when not in combat or when not using associated abilities such as warping or special weapon skills. If a character's current HP reaches zero, they enter Danger Mode, during which the maximum HP cap steadily decreases; the character is defeated when all of their maximum HP is lost. Some enemies, such as Daemons, are able to lower the HP cap with their attacks. If Noctis is defeated, there is a brief period where a revival item must be used. Should the player fail to do so, the game ends.

Noctis can perform four actions in battle: the standard attack; defending, which blocks and parries attacks; warping, which takes Noctis to a targeted area such as another enemy or an out-of-the-way warp point, and using items. There is a "Wait Mode" option available, where if all player input stops the battle pauses, and players are able to select new enemies to attack or actions to take within a time limit. An option available for both Noctis and Ignis in Wait Mode is Libra, an ability which displays an enemy's health, strengths and weaknesses. Noctis can find and equip a wide range of weapons, including single and double-handed swords, polearms, axes, shields, firearms, daggers and Royal Arms. The weapons manifest from thin air as Noctis fights, and can be manually shifted by the player. The type of weapon equipped determines the attack speed and the amount of damage on normal attacks. In addition to normal attacks, there are attacks that deal more damage based on Noctis' position such as "Side Strike" or "Blindside", in addition to the Warp Strike attack. Attacks from enemies can be parried, and depending on the quality of the parry Noctis can counterattack. If wielding a shield-type weapon, a successful block staggers an enemy, leaving them vulnerable to attack. Noctis can launch a special attack with the Royal Arms dubbed "Armiger", when the meter fills during combat: while more powerful than standard weapons, Royal Arms consume HP with each use. Noctis can also use two classes of firearms—Guns, which range from handguns like pistols to rifles; and Machinery, powerful weapons that have varying effects depending on the type used, from generating a powerful shockwave to dealing high melee damage.

Noctis's companions, controlled by the game's artificial intelligence (AI), can perform contextual commands. When Noctis successfully parries an enemy attack, or performs a Side Strike or Blindside, cooperative attacks between him and his companions called Link-strikes can be triggered. During battle, a meter called the Tech Bar fills. When full, Noctis can command his companions to perform special moves called Techniques: Gladiolus performs a sweeping attack with his sword, Ignis uses his daggers to mark enemies so Noctis can perform a warp strike attack, and Prompto uses his firearm to fire a powerful shot that pierces through tough opponents. After each of these, Noctis can initiate a follow-up attack. Noctis can also trigger an Armiger Chain, where he splits his Royal Arms between his companions before launching a single attack.

Magic is separated into two types: Elemancy and Arcana. Elemancy is separated into three types: Fire, Ice and Lightning. Elemental energy is drawn from points across the world map, being absorbed into special flasks and used to craft magical bombs that can be used on enemies. Elemancy can also be combined with specific items to add new effects, such as healing party members while damaging enemies. Both Noctis and his companions are able to use Elemancy. Arcana, accessed when Noctis has acquired and equipped a story-related item called the Ring of the Lucii, has access to more powerful magical abilities such as "Death", which drains an enemy's health. After a certain point in the game, Noctis can call upon summoned monsters called Astrals, which aid the party by launching a devastating attack. The summons featured are series regulars including Titan, Ramuh, Leviathan and Shiva. Their types of attack, and even whether they assist at all, is dependent on the environment: for instance, Leviathan can only be summoned in the open when there is a body of water nearby. At certain points in the story, Noctis is joined by guest characters who have their own Link-strikes and Techniques.

=== Character progression ===
After each battle, characters earn experience points (EXP), but they do not automatically level up when a certain amount of EXP has been gathered. Instead, the party must go to safe zones called "Havens", namely rest sites like inns or campsites. When the party rests at night, each character gains levels depending on the amount of EXP earned. If defeated in battle, all EXP gained up to that point since the last level up is permanently lost. Activities in the overworld earn the party Ability Points (AP). AP is spent on the Ascension Grid, the game's leveling system, which is divided into skill trees called "Astralspheres". Each Astralsphere is sorted by type, being associated with magic, combat or passive abilities. Spending AP opens up nodes within the Astralsphere, which in turn grants access to further nodes which require higher amounts of AP to unlock.

Noctis' companions each have their own skills which themselves level up based on usage, and affect equipment. Noctis' fishing ability improves the more times he fishes and the better items he uses, which in turn spreads to his equipment. Gladiolus' Survival skills increase based on the distance the party has travelled in a day, which improves the quality of their equipment and items. Ignis' cooking can be improved based on ingredients either purchased at shops or found in the wild, and his meals grant stat boosts to the party. Prompto takes photos during the party's journey, and the quality of his own skills increase over time. A post-release update enables control of all four characters during battle after unlocking a dedicated node in the Ascension Grid; each character uses specific weapon types and abilities tied to them.

=== Multiplayer ===
A multiplayer mode called Comrades was released as an expansion, with gameplay and combat lifted from the main game and tailored for multiplayer; rather than a pre-set character, players take the role of a customizable avatar who takes part in a portion of the story skipped over by the main narrative. The game begins with players choosing their gender, hairstyle, clothing and other aspects. Using the in-game city of Lestallum as their base, the player is assigned missions with three other characters—either other players or AI-controlled. During missions, the player fights monsters either on sorties or to defend transports; at the end of each mission, the player is awarded Gil, materials used for crafting and enhancing weapons, and "Meteorshards" which can power up settlements around Lestallum and open up new quests. Some areas unlock Royal Tombs which grant the player a Royal Sigil; these Sigils both increase specific statistics and grant new themed abilities such as healing or increasing combat moves. The player has access to a variety of weapon types from normal swords to maces and shurikens, which are enhanced using materials to increase passive abilities such as their damage capacity. The multiplayer mode was shut down for Origin and Microsoft Store copies of the game in June 2020, though the Comrades campaign can still be played with NPC party members.

== Plot ==
=== Setting ===
Final Fantasy XV takes place on the Earth-like world of Eos, which is divided between four nations: Lucis, Accordo, Tenebrae and Niflheim. Lucis, occupying a whole landmass, possesses a magical artifact known as the Crystal, gifted to the reigning Caelum dynasty by the world's deities in antiquity and accessed through the hereditary Ring of the Lucii. Accordo, located in the southern part of Eos, is an island nation formed through a union of free trading cities. The western continent is home to the technologically advanced empire of Niflheim and the nation of Tenebrae, which is ruled by the Oracle—a priestess who can commune with the gods. The Oracle's main task is curing the Starscourge, a plague that absorbs all natural light and turns those infected into nocturnal monsters known as Daemons.

Central to the lore of Eos are the Astrals, six divine beings who serve as the guardians of the natural world and are based on summoned monsters from the Final Fantasy series; and the True King, a legendary figure prophesied to appear when the Starscourge threatens to plunge Eos into eternal night. A key part of Eos's backstory is the Great War of Old, a conflict born when the ancient human civilization of Solheim turned on the Astrals, one of whom was Solheim's patron Ifrit. Ifrit's subsequent attempt to destroy humanity defied the Astrals' duty to protect Eos, forcing their leader Bahamut to kill him. This conflict is implied to have caused the spread of the Starscourge across the planet, hastening the fall of Solheim.

For centuries, Lucis has been at war with the militaristic Niflheim, who seek to emulate Solheim's glory. To that end Niflheim has subjugated most of Eos, including Accordo and Tenebrae; Tenebrae retains limited political autonomy due to the Oracle's influence. Only Lucis's capital city of Insomnia remains unconquered due to the use of the Crystal's power, which is slowly draining the current king's life force. At the game's beginning an armistice is declared between the two nations due to the king's failing health; as part of the peace agreements, Niflheim will gain control of all Lucian territories outside Insomnia, and a marriage is arranged between the heirs apparent of the royal families of Lucis and Tenebrae.

=== Characters ===
Promotional artwork featuring the core and supporting cast of Final Fantasy XV and its expanded media

The game's protagonist is Noctis Lucis Caelum (Ray Chase/Tatsuhisa Suzuki), the Crown Prince of the Kingdom of Lucis, who loses his father in the Niflheim invasion. Noctis is accompanied on his journey throughout the world of Eos by his three friends: Gladiolus Amicitia (Chris Parson/Kenta Miyake), the scion of a family sworn to protect Noctis's family; Ignis Scientia (Adam Croasdell/Mamoru Miyano), a prodigy military tactician and Noctis's aide; and Prompto Argentum (Robbie Daymond/Tetsuya Kakihara), a childhood friend of Noctis from a lower social class. Guest characters include Cor Leonis (Matthew Mercer/Hiroki Tōchi), a legendary warrior of Lucis and the leader of the Crownsguard who acts as an early guide to Noctis's party; Iris Amicitia (Eden Riegel/Megumi Han), the younger sister of Gladiolus; and Aranea Highwind (Kari Wahlgren/Miyuki Sawashiro), a mercenary dragoon in service to Niflheim. Other key characters are Lunafreya Nox Fleuret (Amy Shiels/Rina Kitagawa), the current Oracle and former Princess of Tenebrae who is betrothed to Noctis; Regis Lucis Caelum CXIII (Jim Pirri/Tsutomu Isobe), king of Lucis and the father of Noctis; and Gentiana (Renee Faia/Sayaka Kinoshita), Lunafreya's attendant. The empire of Niflheim is ruled by Emperor Iedolas Aldercapt (Bob Joles/Shōzō Iizuka). Aldercapt's notable subordinates include Ardyn Izunia (Darin De Paul/Keiji Fujiwara), the imperial chancellor and the game's main antagonist; Ravus Nox Fleuret (Trevor Devall/Yuichi Nakamura), Lunafreya's brother and the high commander of Niflheim; and Verstael Besithia (Steve Blum/Jin Urayama), the empire's head researcher.

=== Story ===
Noctis and his three friends begin their journey to Altissia, the capital of Accordo, where Noctis's wedding to Lunafreya will take place. Finding the local boat services stopped, they receive news of Niflheim's attack on the city of Insomnia and theft of the Crystal; King Regis has been assassinated, and both Noctis and Lunafreya are declared dead. Meeting up with Cor, Noctis is tasked with retrieving the Royal Arms—the magical weapons of past Lucian kings—to rescue the Crystal and reclaim his throne. While staying in the city of Lestallum with Iris, Noctis is contacted by the Astral Titan; encouraged by Ardyn, Noctis endures Titan's trial and earns his power, learning that Lunafreya is traveling ahead of Noctis to awaken the Astrals from their slumber. The group continues to travel across Lucis, retrieving the Royal Arms and meeting the Astral Ramuh with assistance from Gentiana. He is also confronted by a hostile Ravus, spars with the mercenary Aranea, and receives further aid from Ardyn. The group eventually recover parts to repair Regis's old yacht, using it to travel to Altissia.

The party arrives in Altissia, where Lunafreya has taken sanctuary. Lunafreya awakens the Astral Leviathan so Noctis can obtain her power, only for Leviathan to go on a rampage when Niflheim attacks. Ardyn appears and mortally wounds Lunafreya, disrupting the ritual, but she succeeds in awakening Noctis's powers, allowing him to defeat Leviathan. While unconscious, he is visited in a dream by Lunafreya's spirit, who gives him the Ring of the Lucii. Noctis wakes to find Lunafreya dead, Altissia in chaos and that Ignis was blinded during the battle. The party continues towards Niflheim's capital of Gralea by train. Ignis' blindness and Noctis's mourning of Lunafreya cause friction with Gladiolus until Ignis forces a reconciliation. It is also revealed that the nights are growing longer, causing more Daemons to appear. Ardyn tricks Noctis into pushing Prompto off the train, and holds Prompto and the Crystal captive in Gralea's military fortress Zegnautus Keep, the primary laboratory where Niflheim creates its military infantry, cybernetic robots which use daemonic energy. Noctis discovers that the Crystal's power can destroy Daemons. Noctis continues to Tenebrae, where Aranea is aiding refugees from across Eos. There, Noctis learns that Lunafreya was dying from waking the Astrals, and that Ravus now supports him. On the final journey to Gralea, the train is ambushed by Daemons. After defeating them, Noctis receives the Astral Shiva's blessing from Gentiana, revealed as Shiva's human form.

Arriving to find Gralea overrun by Daemons, Noctis is separated from his friends and forced to use the Ring of the Lucii and survive Zegnautus Keep. After reuniting and rescuing Prompto, the party continues through Zegnautus Keep, defeating Ravus and Emperor Aldercapt, who have been transformed into Daemons. Forcefully leaving his friends behind, Noctis reaches the Crystal, only to be pulled into it. Ardyn appears and reveals himself as Ardyn Lucis Caelum, a healer ostracized with support from the Astrals and the Crystal, after being infected by the Starscourge. He sought revenge on the family bloodline and the Crystal, spreading the Starscourge while waiting for the True King to appear so he could destroy them both. Within the Crystal, Noctis meets Bahamut, and learns that he is the True King of prophecy, who will cleanse the Starscourge and restore light to Eos at the cost of his life. Noctis returns to Eos after ten years, finding the world engulfed in darkness. Reuniting with his friends, Noctis heads for Insomnia, fighting Ifrit—revived and corrupted by the Starscourge—before facing Ardyn. After killing Ardyn in single combat, Noctis ascends the throne and sacrifices himself, using the Crystal and Ring of the Lucii to purge the Starscourge from Eos. In the afterlife, with the help from Lunafreya, Noctis destroys Ardyn's spirit. In mid-credits and post-credits scenes, it is revealed that Noctis opened up to his companions before the final battle, and finds rest with Lunafreya in the afterlife.

== Development ==
Final Fantasy XV was primarily developed by Square Enix's Business Division 2. Additional studios that helped with development included HexaDrive, XPEC Entertainment, Plusmile, and Streamline Studios. Staff included director Hajime Tabata; producer Shinji Hashimoto; main writer Saori Itamuro, who wrote the scenario based on the original draft by Kazushige Nojima; and art directors Tomohiro Hasegawa, Yusuke Naora and Isamu Kamikokuryo. Character designs were by Tetsuya Nomura and Roberto Ferrari, with later revisions by Naora. The main characters' clothing was designed by Hiromu Takahara, lead designer for Japanese fashion house Roen. The soundtrack was composed primarily by Yoko Shimomura, while both real-time and CGI cutscenes were directed by Takeshi Nozue of Visual Works, Square Enix's in-house CGI production studio. Logo illustration was by regular series artist Yoshitaka Amano.

Development began in 2006 as a spin-off for the PlayStation 3 called Final Fantasy Versus XIII, as part of the Fabula Nova Crystallis Final Fantasy, a subseries of games linked by a common mythos, and ran in Square Enix's proprietary Crystal Tools engine. Developed by the team behind the Kingdom Hearts series, it was intended to be a darker entry in the Final Fantasy series than allowed in the main series. Nomura was the original director, designer, and created the initial concept and scenario. The project suffered from a prolonged and troubled development, only making fragmentary appearances over the following six years. As early as 2007, the project's scale prompted talks of rebranding it as the next mainline entry. With the internal unveiling of the PlayStation 4 and Xbox One, it was decided to change it into a mainline entry, with a proposed PS3 version being scrapped due to technical troubles. The game's engine also changed, shifting to the company's new proprietary Luminous Engine. At the time of its rebranding and shift to next-generation consoles in 2012, Versus XIII was described as being on 20-25% complete, with Tabata saying it never took shape.

When Tabata took over from Nomura, the entire development team was reshuffled and development started over again, although he worked as a co-director with Nomura until late 2013 to ensure the project remained as true as possible to its original vision. Among the changes were the removal of the original story's opening, and the replacement of the original heroine Stella Nox Fleuret with the similarly named Lunafreya. The connection to Fabula Nova Crystallis was also reduced, with branding and mythos-specific terminology removed to aid in the game's marketing. Thematic, aesthetic and design elements were retained due to their core place in the world and backstory. The main concept behind Final Fantasy XV was "a fantasy based on reality", with the world being very similar to Earth and having fantasy elements gradually intruding into an otherwise normal setting. In pursuit of this, locations in Eos were based on real-world locations such as Tokyo, Venice and the Bahamas.

=== Final Fantasy XV Universe ===
Due to the scale of the game's narrative and Tabata's wish to release a single game rather than a series of games similar to Final Fantasy XIII, aspects of the planned narrative were refashioned into supplementary media projects. Known as the "Final Fantasy XV Universe", the projects were split into two parts; media designed to reach a wider audience than the game might manage alone, and additional game-related content such as ports to other hardware and DLC. The project was first revealed at a March 2016 press event called "Uncovered: Final Fantasy XV". Tabata later stated that those who just played the game would miss context for story events shown in other related media.

The two central parts of the "Final Fantasy XV Universe" are the feature film Kingsglaive: Final Fantasy XV and the original net animation Brotherhood: Final Fantasy XV. Brotherhood was produced by anime studio A-1 Pictures under supervision from Square Enix; the narrative focused on the backstories of Noctis and his companions. The series was released online between March and September 2016. Kingsglaive, which received a limited theatrical release in 2016, was a collaboration between Visual Works and Western studios including Digic Pictures and Image Engine; the story, which mainly focused on original characters, recycled story elements cut from the opening narrative of Final Fantasy XV.

Also forming part of the project were Platinum Demo: Final Fantasy XV, a game demo detailing an incident in Noctis's childhood which tied into the events of Brotherhood; Justice Monsters Five, a mobile game based on a minigame from Final Fantasy XV which was active from August 2016 to March 2017; A King's Tale: Final Fantasy XV, a promotional beat 'em up featuring Regis as the playable character; Monster of the Deep: Final Fantasy XV, a virtual reality simulation game released in 2017 for PlayStation VR; and Final Fantasy XV: A New Empire, a massively multiplayer online strategy game published by Machine Zone in 2017 and developed by their Epic Action subsidiary.

=== Release ===
Initially announced in 2006 alongside XIII and Type-0, the game was publicly rebranded at E3 2013, with regular updates on the title beginning the following year. A demo titled Final Fantasy XV: Episode Duscae was released in March 2015 as a limited addition to Final Fantasy Type-0 HD. The game's localization was handled by Dan Inoue, who used different accents for characters to denote their origins on different parts of Eos. In addition to English, Japanese and European languages, the game was localized for Latin America with Latin American Spanish and Brazilian Portuguese text: this was the first time a Final Fantasy title was localized into these languages.

Its initial worldwide release, September 30, was announced at the "Uncovered" event. Despite this intended date, further polishing work resulted in the date being pushed back to November 29. Further fixes were applied to the game through a Day One patch released concurrent with the game. The game was published in multiple editions, called "Day One", "Deluxe", and "Ultimate Collector's Edition". The "Deluxe" edition included a Blu-ray edition of Kingsglaive, while the "Ultimate Collector's Edition" included both Kingsglaive and a version of Brotherhood with additional footage related to Luna. In 2018, a version of the game called Royal Edition was released, which contained both all DLC published to that point in addition to further story and gameplay additions alongside technical improvements.

A version for Windows was released on March 6, 2018. Square Enix developed the port with Nvidia using an upgraded version of the Luminous Studio engine, featuring graphical enhancements and all DLC. These improvements and additions were also released as part of the console-exclusive Royal Edition. The game was also ported to the streaming-based Stadia platform, releasing on November 19, 2019, as a launch title. Another version, titled Final Fantasy XV: Pocket Edition, was released in February 2018 for iOS and Android. The game was co-developed by Square Enix, SummerTimeStudio, and XPEC Entertainment. Development began in 2015 following the release of Episode Duscae; the game was produced by Kosei Ito, who was producer on Tabata's first major Square Enix title Before Crisis: Final Fantasy VII.

==== Downloadable content ====
Multiple pieces of downloadable content (DLC) were created for the game by a smaller development team from the core Final Fantasy XV staff. The team was supervised by Tabata and headed by new producer Haruyoshi Sawatari. Among the DLC were additional story elements intended to address player criticisms of the game's narrative structure and missing details. The journeys of Noctis' friends during their absence in the main story are expanded through the character-driven DLC episodes—Episode Gladiolus, Episode Prompto and Episode Ignis—which were released respectively in March, June and December 2017. A story-driven multiplayer mode called Comrades was released in November 2017, with Final Fantasy XV becoming the first mainline single-player Final Fantasy to include multiplayer content. A standalone version of Comrades was released for PS4 and Xbox One in December 2018 to replace the DLC version of Comrades.

Episode Ignis was intended to be the last story-based DLC, but positive player feedback resulted in Square Enix wanting to develop further content focusing on other main characters, such as Ardyn. Episode Ardyn was released in March 2019, and was the final post-release update for Final Fantasy XV. Originally part of a tetralogy of story-based DLC episodes dubbed The Dawn of the Future, the other episodes were cancelled due to structural changes within Square Enix. Story material for The Dawn of the Future DLC has been turned into a novel of the same name. It was first released in Japan in April 2019, and worldwide in June 2020.

== Reception ==
Reception

Aggregate scores
Aggregator	Score
Metacritic	PC: 85/100; XONE: 83/100; PS4: 81/100 (Royal Edition) PS4: 77/100
OpenCritic	94% recommend(Windows Edition) (Note: Based on 18 reviews); 38% recommend(Episode Ardyn) (Note: Based on 9 reviews)

Review scores
Publication	Score
Destructoid	9/10
Electronic Gaming Monthly	7.5/10
Famitsu	38/40
Game Informer	8.5/10
GameRevolution	4/5
GameSpot	8/10
GamesRadar+	4.5/5
Hardcore Gamer	3.5/5
IGN	8.2/10
Polygon	9/10
Digital Spy	3.5/5

Final Fantasy XV has received "generally favorable" reviews from critics for all versions, according to review aggregator Metacritic. Japanese gaming magazine Famitsu gave both versions of the game a score of 38 points out of 40. Various game designers stated Final Fantasy XV was their favorite game of 2016, including Final Fantasy series creator Hironobu Sakaguchi, Atlus' Shigeo Komori, Koei Tecmo's Takashi Morinaka, and Sony Interactive Entertainment's Teruyuki Toriyama and Shuhei Yoshida.

Opinions on the story of Final Fantasy XV were mixed, although the main cast was praised for its chemistry. Game Informer's Andrew Reiner praised the change to a simple straightforward plot after the complex lore of Final Fantasy XIII. Peter Brown of GameSpot and Philip Kollar of Polygon praised the mundane activities and character interactions, with Kollar calling Noctis's companions the game's "beating heart". In contrast, Jonathan Leack of Game Revolution found the characters lacked interest during the early parts of the campaign, and Hardcore Gamer's Adam Beck called the main story a "monumental disappointment" despite enjoying the lead cast. The minimal representation of supporting characters was also frequently faulted. David Roberts of GamesRadar, Electronic Gaming Monthly's Mollie L. Patterson and Destructoid's Chris Carter also noted the crucial part played by the game's expanded media in grounding or fleshing out the main story.

The visuals and realistic style were positively received, with IGN's Vince Ingenito enjoying the unusual use of realistic aesthetic details for the towns and environment. Roberts, Brown, Leack, Beck and Kollar praised the open world design and depth of detail, in addition to its scale and similarity to open worlds from recent Western games. Beck also noted the setpiece moments as beautiful in appearance despite weak narrative elements and confusing or convoluted gameplay. Leack positively noted the main cast's eye-catching design, which he felt helped maintain a connection during the early sections of the game. Shimomura's score was also positively received by critics.

The gameplay was praised for its fast pace and engaging mechanics despite a lack of depth compared with other action games, with several reviewers comparing it to Kingdom Hearts; Patterson positively compared normal battles to the CGI cutscene-exclusive battles of earlier Square Enix titles, while Leack called the combat system "Kingdom Hearts meets Dissidia" and praised its depth and accessibility. Digital Spy's Kirk McKeand praised the behaviour of Noctis's companions in battle, saying they were effective supporting units. The linear second half drew criticism, with Roberts predicting that it would be one of the game's most divisive elements. The summons were seen as spectacular, but either lacking meaning in gameplay or being too difficult to activate. Several reviewers noted the in-game camera's occasionally erratic behaviour.

=== Sales ===
In Japan, the PS4 version topped Japanese gaming charts, selling 690,471 units. The Xbox One version sold nearly 3,800 units. Total sales of both versions came to 694,262 units, with the game's release boosting console sales for the PS4 over the previous week by over 42,000 units. Second week sales in the region were 79,792 units, down 88% from launch week and causing the game to drop to fifth place. Different rankings in January the following year placed the Japanese sales of Final Fantasy XV as between 900,000 and one million copies. In the United Kingdom's all-format gaming charts ending December 3, Final Fantasy XV was the second biggest launch for the series after Final Fantasy XIII. According to the December data released by the NPD Group, Final Fantasy XV was the second best-selling title of the month behind Call of Duty: Infinite Warfare. The game also became the month's best-selling PS4 title, and saw the best console launch month in the franchise's history.

Within the first twenty-four hours, Square Enix reported that Final Fantasy XV had shipped five million units worldwide in both physical shipments and digital sales—a figure which allowed the game to "break even" on development costs. This gave Final Fantasy XV the biggest launch in the franchise to date, the most first day digital sales in Japan for a game up to that point, and set records for physical shipments and downloads in mainland Asia. Commenting on the large numbers, Tabata revealed that the strong sales saved the Final Fantasy franchise as a whole, which had seen declining commercial success in recent years. According to Square Enix, shipments had reached over six million worldwide by January 2017. In May of the same year, the game and Rise of the Tomb Raider helped to increase sales and profits for the 2016-2017 fiscal year. By May 2022, Final Fantasy XV had sold ten million units worldwide across all versions, making it one of the best-selling Final Fantasy games of all time.

=== Awards ===
Final Fantasy XV won numerous awards from various gaming publications, including "Game of the Year" from RPG Site and RPGFan, and "Best RPG (People's Choice)" from IGN, PlayStation Blog awarded Final Fantasy XV awards in the categories of "Best PS4 Game", "Best Use of Pro", "Best Soundtrack", and "Best Visuals"; and in Game Informer's 2017 RPG of the Year Awards awarded the game for "Best Post-Launch Support". At the 2017 National Academy of Video Game Trade Reviewers Awards the game won Game, Franchise Role Playing and Song, Original or Adapted. It was also nominated for "Best Original Soundtrack Album" and for "Best Original Instrumental" ("Valse di Fantastica") at the 15th Annual Game Audio Network Guild Awards. In 2017, the game was nominated for "Best Visual Design" at the Golden Joystick Awards, and for "Best Role-Playing Game" at The Game Awards 2017, but lost to Cuphead and Persona 5, respectively. The Comrades DLC was nominated for "Best Add-on" at the Gamescom 2017 Awards. The game was also nominated for "Evolving Game" at the 14th British Academy Games Awards. At the 2017 Japan Game Awards, Final Fantasy XV was one of eleven recipients of the "Award for Excellence".

In 2019, NHK conducted a Final Fantasy poll in Japan with over 468,000 voters, including 51% male and 49% female voters. Final Fantasy XV was voted the tenth best game in the series, with over 71% of its votes coming from female audiences, a higher proportion than any other Final Fantasy title.
