= List of SaGa video games =

Series of video games

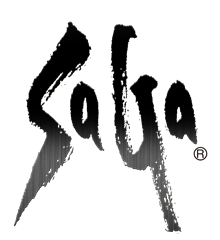

SaGa is a series of role-playing video games developed and published by Square Enix (formerly Square). Its first game premiered in Japan in 1989, and SaGa games have subsequently been localized for markets in North America and Europe across multiple video game consoles since the series debut on the Game Boy with The Final Fantasy Legend. The original Game Boy trilogy was released outside of Japan under the Final Fantasy brand for marketing purposes but was otherwise unrelated to the franchise. Several titles remained exclusive to Japan in their original forms, only coming to other territories with ports or remakes on later platforms. Most games have their own settings and gameplay mechanics. Series creator Akitoshi Kawazu led or advised the development of most of the games.

New SaGa games were released for home and handheld consoles until Unlimited Saga in 2002, after which Square Enix only developed ports and remakes of already released SaGa games until SaGa: Scarlet Grace in 2016. Beginning in 2012 with Emperors SaGa, the series expanded onto mobile and web browsers. Square Enix published one collection of SaGa games, the 2020 Collection of SaGa: Final Fantasy Legend for the Nintendo Switch, containing ports of the original three SaGa games. The series has reached cumulative sales and downloads of over ten million units worldwide as of 2020. The Romancing SaGa trilogy is the best-selling part of the series, with four million copies sold worldwide.

== Games ==
=== Console games ===
Console games
Game	Details
The Final Fantasy Legend Original release dates: JP: December 15, 1989; NA: September 1990; EU: December 19, 2020 (Collection of Saga)	Release years by system: 1989 – Game Boy; 2002 – WonderSwan Color; 2007 – Mobile phones (i-mode, EZweb); 2008 – Mobile phones (SoftBank Mobile); 2020 – Nintendo Switch (Collection of SaGa); 2021 – Android, iOS, Microsoft Windows (Collection of SaGa)
The Final Fantasy Legend Original release dates: JP: December 15, 1989; NA: September 1990; EU: December 19, 2020 (Collection of Saga)	Notes: Released in Japan under the title Makai Toushi SaGa (魔界塔士 サ・ガ, Warrior in the Tower of the Spirit World ~ Sa·Ga); First role-playing video game released for the Game Boy; Re-released in North America by Sunsoft in 1998; Remake with enhanced graphics and gameplay released for the WonderSwan Color; Mobile versions based on the WonderSwan Color version; Mobile versions shut down in 2018 with the end of services for older mobile titles; Port of original version included in Collection of SaGa: Final Fantasy Legend (2020)
Final Fantasy Legend II Original release dates: JP: December 14, 1990; NA: November 1991; EU: December 19, 2020 (Collection of Saga)	Release years by system: 1990 – Game Boy; 2009 – Nintendo DS (3D remake); 2020 – Nintendo Switch (Collection of SaGa); 2021 – Android, iOS, Microsoft Windows (Collection of SaGa)
Final Fantasy Legend II Original release dates: JP: December 14, 1990; NA: November 1991; EU: December 19, 2020 (Collection of Saga)	Notes: Released in Japan under the title Sa・Ga2: Hihō Densetsu (サ・ガ2 秘宝伝説, SaGa 2: Legend of the Secret Treasure); Re-released in North America by Sunsoft in 1998; 3D remake developed by Racjin released for the Nintendo DS in Japan in 2009 as SaGa 2 Hihō Densetsu: Goddess of Destiny; Port of original version included in Collection of SaGa: Final Fantasy Legend (2020)
Final Fantasy Legend III Original release dates: JP: December 13, 1991; NA: August 1993; EU: December 19, 2020 (Collection of Saga)	Release years by system: 1991 – Game Boy; 2011 – Nintendo DS (3D remake); 2020 – Nintendo Switch (Collection of SaGa); 2021 – Android, iOS, Microsoft Windows (Collection of SaGa)
Final Fantasy Legend III Original release dates: JP: December 13, 1991; NA: August 1993; EU: December 19, 2020 (Collection of Saga)	Notes: Released in Japan under the title SaGa 3: Jikuu no Hasha [Kanketsu Hen] (時空の覇者 サ・ガ3 [完結編], The Ruler of Time and Space ~ SaGa3 [Final Chapter]); Re-released in North America by Sunsoft in 1998; 3D remake developed by Racjin released for the Nintendo DS in Japan in 2011 as SaGa 3 Jiku no Hasha: Shadow or Light; Port of original version included in Collection of SaGa: Final Fantasy Legend (2020)
Romancing SaGa Original release dates: JP: January 28, 1992; NA: October 11, 2005 (remake); EU: December 01, 2022 (remaster)	Release years by system: 1992 – Super Famicom; 2001 – WonderSwan Color; 2005 – PlayStation 2; 2009 – Mobile phone (i-mode, EZweb, SoftBank Mobile); 2022 - Android, iOS, Microsoft Windows, Nintendo Switch, PlayStation 4, PlayStation 5
Romancing SaGa Original release dates: JP: January 28, 1992; NA: October 11, 2005 (remake); EU: December 01, 2022 (remaster)	Notes: Second Super Famicom release from Square; Original version exclusive to Japan; Expanded version released for the WonderSwan Color in 2001; Remake of Romancing SaGa released for the PlayStation 2 in 2005, using 3D graphics and redone soundtrack; Remake known as Romancing SaGa: Minstrel Song in Japan; Mobile versions based on the WonderSwan Color version; Mobile versions shut down in 2018 with the end of services for older mobile titles
Romancing SaGa 2 Original release date: JP: December 10, 1993; NA: December 15, 2017 (remaster); EU: December 15, 2017 (remaster)	Release years by system: 1993 – Super Famicom; 2010 – Mobile phone (i-mode); 2011 – Mobile phone (EZweb); 2016 – Android, iOS, PlayStation Vita; 2017 – Microsoft Windows, Nintendo Switch, PlayStation 4, Xbox One; 2024 – PlayStation 5; 2025 – Nintendo Switch 2, Xbox Series X/S
Romancing SaGa 2 Original release date: JP: December 10, 1993; NA: December 15, 2017 (remaster); EU: December 15, 2017 (remaster)	Notes: Original version exclusive to Japan; Remastered version released worldwide in 2017; Remake known as Romancing SaGa 2: Revenge of the Seven released worldwide for Windows, Nintendo Switch, PlayStation 4, and PlayStation 5 in 2024 and Nintendo Switch 2 and Xbox Series S/X in 2025
Romancing SaGa 3 Original release dates: JP: November 11, 1995; NA: November 11, 2019 (remaster); EU: November 11, 2019 (remaster)	Release years by system: 1995 – Super Famicom; 2019 – Android, iOS, Microsoft Windows, Nintendo Switch, PlayStation 4, PlayStation Vita, Xbox One
Romancing SaGa 3 Original release dates: JP: November 11, 1995; NA: November 11, 2019 (remaster); EU: November 11, 2019 (remaster)	Notes: Original version exclusive to Japan; Remastered version released worldwide with additional content in 2019
SaGa Frontier Original release dates: JP: July 11, 1997; NA: March 25, 1998; EU: April 15, 2021 (remaster)	Release years by system: 1997 – PlayStation; 2021 – Android, iOS, Microsoft Windows, Nintendo Switch, PlayStation 4
SaGa Frontier Original release dates: JP: July 11, 1997; NA: March 25, 1998; EU: April 15, 2021 (remaster)	Notes: First SaGa title released under its original name outside of Japan; Original North American release published by Sony Computer Entertainment; Remastered version with restored cut content released worldwide by Square Enix in 2021
SaGa Frontier 2 Original release dates: JP: April 1, 1999; NA: February 15, 2000; EU: March 22, 2000	Release years by system: 1999 – PlayStation; 2025 – Android, iOS, Microsoft Windows, Nintendo Switch, PlayStation 4, PlayStation 5
SaGa Frontier 2 Original release dates: JP: April 1, 1999; NA: February 15, 2000; EU: March 22, 2000	Notes: Series debut in Europe; Remastered version released worldwide by in 2025
Unlimited Saga Original release dates: JP: December 19, 2002; NA: June 17, 2003; EU: October 31, 2003	Release years by system: 2002 – PlayStation 2
Unlimited Saga Original release dates: JP: December 19, 2002; NA: June 17, 2003; EU: October 31, 2003	Notes: European version published by Atari; Published in South Korea by Electronic Arts in June 2003
SaGa: Scarlet Grace Original release dates: JP: December 15, 2016; NA: December 3, 2019; EU: December 3, 2019	Release years by system: 2016 – PlayStation Vita; 2018 – Android, iOS, Microsoft Windows, Nintendo Switch, PlayStation 4 (Ambitions)
SaGa: Scarlet Grace Original release dates: JP: December 15, 2016; NA: December 3, 2019; EU: December 3, 2019	Notes: PlayStation Vita version exclusive to Japan; Expanded version, subtitled Ambitions, released in 2018 in Japan and 2019 worldwide
SaGa: Emerald Beyond Original release dates: JP: April 25, 2024; NA: April 25, 2024; EU: April 25, 2024	Release years by system: 2024 - Android, iOS, Nintendo Switch, PlayStation 4, PlayStation 5, Windows

=== Mobile and browser games ===
Mobile and browser games
Game	Details
Emperors SaGa Original release date: JP: September 18, 2012	Release years by system: 2012 – Mobile phones (GREE); 2013 – Mobile phones (Mobage, NTT Docomo)
Emperors SaGa Original release date: JP: September 18, 2012	Notes: First title in the series originally developed for mobile devices; Developed by Altplus; Shut down on April 28, 2017
Imperial SaGa Original release date: JP: June 18, 2015	Release years by system: 2015 – Web browser
Imperial SaGa Original release date: JP: June 18, 2015	Notes: Developed by Think & Feel; Shut down on December 26, 2019
Romancing SaGa Re;univerSe Original release dates: JP: December 6, 2018; NA: June 25, 2020; EU: June 25, 2020	Release years by system: 2019 – Android, iOS
Romancing SaGa Re;univerSe Original release dates: JP: December 6, 2018; NA: June 25, 2020; EU: June 25, 2020	Notes: Developed by Akatsuki; Set in the world of Romancing SaGa 3
Imperial SaGa Eclipse Original release date: JP: October 31, 2019	Release years by system: 2019 – Web browser
Imperial SaGa Eclipse Original release date: JP: October 31, 2019	Notes: Sequel to Imperial SaGa; Developed by Think & Feel

== Collections ==
Remakes and collections
Game	Details
Collection of SaGa: Final Fantasy Legend Original release date: WW: December 19, 2020	Release years by system: 2020 – Nintendo Switch; 2021 – Android, iOS, Microsoft Windows
Collection of SaGa: Final Fantasy Legend Original release date: WW: December 19, 2020	Notes: Port of the original Final Fantasy Legend trilogy; Named The Saga Collection in Japan; Debut of the original Final Fantasy Legend trilogy in Europe
