= Romancing SaGa 2 =

1993 role-playing video game

- Original cover art by Tomomi Kobayashi featuring early character Gerard.
- Developer: Square (Note: Mobile versions developed by Square Enix. Remaster developed by ArtePiazza.)
- Publishers: Square (1993); Square Enix (2011–present)
- Director: Akitoshi Kawazu
- Producer: Tetsuo Mizuno
- Designers: Akitoshi Kawazu; Kyoji Koizumi
- Programmers: Yuki Anasawa; Hiroshi Takai
- Artist: Tomomi Kobayashi
- Writer: Akitoshi Kawazu
- Composer: Kenji Ito
- Series: SaGa
- Platform: Super Famicom: EZweb, i-mode, Android, iOS, PlayStation Vita, Nintendo Switch, PlayStation 4, Windows, Xbox One
- Release: December 10, 1993: Super Famicom; JP: December 10, 1993 Mobile phones; JP: November 1, 2010 (i-mode); JP: March 3, 2011 (EZweb) Android, iOS; JP: March 24, 2016; WW: May 26, 2016 PlayStation Vita; JP: March 24, 2016; WW: December 15, 2017 Switch, PlayStation 4, Windows, Xbox One; WW: December 15, 2017
- Genre: Role-playing
- Mode: Single-player

Romancing SaGa 2 (Note: Romanshingu Sa Ga Tsū (Japanese: ロマンシング サ・ガ2)) is a 1993 role-playing video game developed and published by Square for the Super Famicom (Super Nintendo Entertainment System). Originally exclusive to Japan, a remaster was released worldwide on home consoles, mobile devices, and Windows from 2016 to 2017. The fifth entry in the SaGa series and second in the Romancing SaGa trilogy, the story follows the fate of Avalon, a nation that must fight against a group dubbed the Seven Heroes. Gameplay features nonlinear exploration and expansion of the game world and narrative, with the turn-based battles featuring group formations. As with other SaGa titles, there are no experience points; character attributes and skills are dependent on actions taken in battle. A key mechanic is choosing the next ruler of Avalon, who will inherit the abilities of the previous ruler.

Production began in 1992 after a prolonged concept period during which staff were working on the Final Fantasy series. Returning staff members included series creator Akitoshi Kawazu as director, lead designer, and writer; illustrator Tomomi Kobayashi; and composer Kenji Ito. The delayed start allowed Kawazu to rethink the game design, changing the focus from the multiple protagonists of Romancing SaGa to a single dynastic line. The remaster's production, which was initiated by Kawazu, focused on removing bugs and preserving the sprite artwork.

Romancing SaGa 2 is the best-selling of the three Romancing SaGa titles, having sold over 1.5 million copies in Japan. Reviews of the original praised its gameplay systems but found its characters lacking in depth. The remaster also saw praise from critics for its battle system and inheritance mechanic while faulting its story and difficulty. The original Japanese release was supplemented by multiple guidebooks and a manga adaptation.

A 3D remake, Romancing SaGa 2: Revenge of the Seven, (Note: Romanshingu Sa Ga Tsū: Ribenji Obu Za Sebun (Japanese: ロマンシング サガ2 リベンジオブザセブン)) was developed by Xeen and released by Square Enix for Nintendo Switch, PlayStation 4, PlayStation 5, and Windows in 2024. Ports to the Nintendo Switch 2 and Xbox Series S and X followed in 2025. Developed by the staff who created the Trials of Mana remake, the team wanted to create a modernised version of Romancing SaGa 2 that would be both faithful to the original and accessible for series newcomers. Ito returned to arrange and expand the soundtrack, while Yoshiro Ambe reworked the character designs. The remake was praised by journalists for its expanded gameplay, graphical, and audio design.

== Gameplay ==
A boss encounter in the original (top), and a standard combat encounter in the 2024 remake (bottom). While having different presentation, the two versions share similar mechanics and structure.

Romancing SaGa 2 is a role-playing video game in which the player take on the role of rulers for Avalon, an expanding empire fighting the corrupted Seven Heroes across a nonlinear narrative; this is dubbed Free Scenario System. Rather than a central cast, the player takes on the role of successive rulers of Avalon−with only the first and last playable characters pre-determined−who must face the Seven Heroes across several centuries. The campaign has a non-linear narrative structure that is based on quests taken by the player, which expand Avalon's influence. The story progresses by completing available quests, such as exploring different territories or defeating main story bosses, and once enough quests are complete the story skips forward, which results in either new quests becoming available or previous ones unavailable based on past activities. Alongside excursions to dungeon areas, the current Emperor manages the territory and capital of Avalon. Based on the current territories their available funds, the Emperor can initiate projects that can be used to develop or enhance weapons and equipment.

While exploring dungeon environments, enemies are represented by sprites on the field; touching a enemy initiates a battle whereas dashing causes them to vanish so they become hard to avoid. Combat uses a turn-based system, and the player assigns all character actions at beginning of a turn; the actions' order are dictated by each unit's speed. The party's proficiency in battle is adjusted through Formations, different configurations of the five party members can grant advantages, such as increased defence or attack power; dashing into an enemy or being attacked from behind breaks the party's formation, removing these advantages. Characters have different innate character classes and access to six different weapon types; light and heavy swords, axes, maces, rapiers, and bows. Continued usage will increase a character's weapon proficiency and increase the likelihood of learning new techniques related to them. There is no experience point-based leveling system, with character statistics raising based on skill points that are accumulated in battle by using specific weapons or abilities. New abilities are unlocked by using weapons enough times in battle or by triggering different situations, such as parrying an enemy attack. Depending on a character's proficiencies, they may focus on melee attacks or have access to magic, such as healing or inflicting status effects.

Characters not only have health and Battle Points, which fuel abilities and spells, but Life Points (LP) which are depleted when their health is depleted, they are attacked while knocked out, or by attacks which target LP. If they still have LP, a character is restored to full health after combat is finished. If a character's LP runs out, they are subject to permanent death, with the current Emperor's death or a full party defeat forcing a new Emperor to be chosen from available candidates. A central mechanic for the chosen Emperor is "Inheritance", which allows the player to transfer abilities and statistics from the previous Emperor to the next. The only traditional Game Over comes if the final playable Emperor runs out of LP. The 2016 remaster includes a New Game Plus option allowing the player to carry money and unlocked abilities into a new game.

The 2024 remake Revenge of the Seven carries over the gameplay and combat elements with some additions and alterations. During combat, the turn order for the player and enemy parties is displayed on a timeline, which can be influenced by actions taken during combat, and actions taken by characters play out immediately. Hitting enemy weaknesses fills up a bar that is used to power United Attacks. When selected, United Attacks have two or more characters perform more powerful versions of linked abilities, dealing increased damage without moving them on the timeline. The player can have a current Emperor willingly abdicate the throne rather than falling in battle. The remake includes a post-game scenario ending in a secret boss fight. Completing this fight unlocks New Game Plus, which allows character stats, abilities, and learned Formations to be carried over into a new game. The remake also features a "Casual" difficulty setting as well as higher "Expert" and "Romancing" difficulties that are unlocked after completing the game.

== Synopsis ==
In the Romancing SaGa 2's backstory, a group of warriors, dubbed the Seven Heroes, saved the world from monster invasions but vanished immediately afterwards. After a millennium, the Seven Heroes have returned but are now corrupted by dark powers and begin attacking the continent. Leon, ruler of the land of Avalon, begins a campaign against the Seven Heroes, which is passed down to his younger son Gerard after he is mortally wounded in battle. Over subsequent generations, the Emperor's power is passed down using the Inheritance spell, with each Emperor expanding and defending Avalon. Over time, Avalon expands into an empire, with its ruler and a chosen group of warriors killing each of the Seven Heroes. When six of the seven are defeated and the final Emperor or Empress takes power, it is revealed that the Seven Heroes faced up to this point were copies and the seventh copy has gone to protect the Heroes' original bodies.

The final Emperor or Empress, whose inheritance magic has worn off, defeats first the final copy, then the true Seven Heroes. The story is bookended by a minstrel retelling the game's events and concluding that the Empire of Avalon was turned into a commonwealth after the Seven Heroes' defeat; the still-living ruler listens to the minstrel. Later versions of Romancing SaGa 2 include optional story content revealing that the Seven Heroes were betrayed by their people, the Ancients, who feared the power the heroes gained by absorbing monsters with an earlier version of the Inheritance spell. The Seven Heroes returned from the realm of monsters to exact revenge.

== Development ==
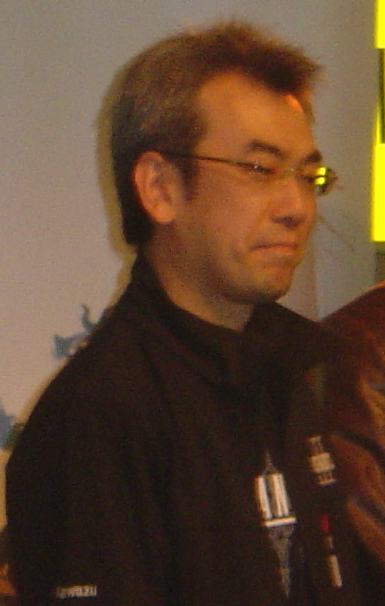
Series creator Akitoshi Kawazu (pictured 2007) returned to Romancing SaGa 2 as director, writer, and designer.

Following the completion and release of Romancing SaGa in early 1992, almost the whole development team was recruited to work on the latest Final Fantasy title, which halted production on SaGa sequels. Ultimately series creator Akitoshi Kawazu was pleased, as he would otherwise would not have had time to rework game mechanics, which would have left Romancing SaGa 2 overly similar to its predecessor. Production began in April for the Super Famicom (Super Nintendo Entertainment System) when new employees had joined the company and Kawazu could create a production team. Kawazu acted as director, lead designer, and scenario writer. Other returning staff included programmers Yuki Anasawa and Hiroshi Takai, illustrator Tomomi Kobayashi, and the sound team of composer Kenji Ito and sound designer Minoru Akao. The mostly-new staff meant that Kawazu's sometimes-drastic changes to the game mechanics were easily accepted. Production lasted one year and had a staff of around twenty people. The staff included planner Akihiko Matsui, who joined the project following work on Final Fantasy V and would go on to co-direct Chrono Trigger; and future composer Yasunori Mitsuda as a sound designer. It was produced by Tetsuo Mizuno, then-president of Square who would go on to found AlphaDream.

As with other SaGa titles, the gameplay mechanics were laid out before the storyline and worldview, with the leading mechanic this time being the inheritance of skills through a lineage. Kawazu compared the in-game role of Emperor to a corporate CEO; his original pitch for the game compared its management elements to SimCity (1989). The inheritance mechanic was part of a scrapped concept for the original SaGa. The central concept was that while the game's ending was set, what happened during the intervening millennium of history was up to the player. As with other entries, the gameplay was designed to be open-ended and influenced a great deal by player choices. The battle system was principally designed by Kyoji Koizumi, who chose to work on it when Kawazu offered him the choice between gameplay and story. Koizumi had aspects of each enemy's design reflect how they appeared in battle; for example, enemies with a lot of health also have large sprites. Kawazu attributed the ability growth and unlock system to Koizumi. Kawazu saw it as an improvement over the original Romancing SaGa.

Kawazu wrote the scenario in parallel to the gameplay system development, with some planned story elements needing to be dropped due to cartridge limitations. Written as a traditional fantasy, the narrative was designed to advance based on the number and order of bosses defeated, with almost all other elements being a wide selection that player could choose from freely. The Seven Heroes were added late into development as a clear end goal for the Inheritence mechanic to be built around. Their concept and number drew inspiration from the Seven Lucky Gods. Kawazu described them as former allies who had drifted apart to pursue their own goals. The leader Subier was the first of the Seven Heroes created, with his name being a double meaning pun on the Japanese god Ebisu and the Ebisu neighbourhood where Square was based. The names of male members in the Japanese versions were anagrams of station names along the Yamanote Line. The one female member Rocbouquet was a challenge, with Kawazu eventually making her name an anagram of Ikebukuro, a commercial center in Tokyo.

In addition to being surprised a Romancing SaGa sequel was being produced, Kobayashi was surprised she was asked to design the cast once again. Kawazu began working with Kobayashi on designing the characters six months into the game's production, with some draft designs already turned into pixel art. Gerard's design was one the earliest to be completed, with his pixel art version influencing Kobayashi's artwork. Compared to her book illustrations, which had at most six characters, Romancing SaGa 2 had dozens of characters to design. She began with characters from the Avalon Empire, particularly the first two rulers: Leon and Gerard. Leon was originally designed with dark skin and a dour look. This design was scrapped in favor of the current version designed around a long-haired flamboyant type. Gerard's role and personality resulted in a more youthful and "boyish" design; although she had hoped to design a more unconventional protagonist after her work on Romancing SaGa. Her favorite character designs were the more challenging ones, such as the android character Coppelia. Kazuyuki Ikumori acted as graphic designer, with his work focusing on background environments as well as the opening and ending sequences.

=== Music ===
Ito felt completely burned out after his work on Romancing SaGa. Recalling his work on the game, Ito said he had worked through feelings of suffering from that creative exhaustion. He worked as both composer and arranger on the title. As with Romancing SaGa, Ito differentiated the soundtrack from the music of Final Fantasy by adding more percussion instruments. The soundtrack includes arrangements of tracks by Nobuo Uematsu; for example, "Heartful Tears" from The Final Fantasy Legend and "The Legend Begins" from its sequel.

Two music albums were published by NTT Publishing: an original soundtrack released in 1993 and reprinted in 1995, and an arranged album in 1995. Square Enix (the entity born from the merged Square and Enix) released a remastered album in 2014, which included the original main battle theme that had been omitted from the original album release. The remaster was supervised by Ito. A reissue, which included an interview with Kawazu and Ito, was released in 2020. Several of the game's music tracks were featured in Theatrhythm Final Fantasy: Curtain Call (2014) as downloadable content.

== Release ==
Romancing SaGa 2 was released on December 10, 1993. Three guidebooks were published by NTT Publishing in association with Square; two in December 1993, and a complete guide in February 1994. Like the other Super Famicom SaGa titles, Romancing SaGa 2 was originally exclusive to Japan. Square localization staff member Ted Woolsey attributed this to a lack of manpower and the wish to keep staff focused on the production of Final Fantasy VII and Trials of Mana. Kawazu attributed the lack of localization both to its unconventional gameplay and the large amount of text in need of translation.

The game received Virtual Console re-releases on the Wii in 2010, the Wii U in 2014, and the New Nintendo 3DS in 2017. The Wii version became unavailable after the shutdown of Wii's online services. CERO rated these versions a higher-than-expected rating due to references alcohol and drugs. The game was ported to mobile phones. It originally released for i-mode on November 1, 2010; an EZweb version followed on March 3, 2011. The port included a new dungeon called the Maze of Memories, featuring the background lore for the Seven Heroes. Several bugs and exploits from the original were fixed, with a new area included to replace a popular exploit to increase in-game funds. New character classes were distributed as paid downloadable content. This version shut down in 2018, when the services for older mobile titles ceased.

=== Remaster ===
Kawazu had been considering remaking or remastering Romancing SaGa 2 for smartphones since 2012. It was chosen due to its popularity and the fact that Kawazu had already remade Romancing SaGa for the PlayStation 2. The remaster's producer, Masanori Ichikawa, who was working with Kawazu on Emperors SaGa at the time, was encouraged to approach multiple companies worldwide to work on a port. Due to phone technology at the time, Ichikawa doubted a port that preserved its art style was possible. The remaster was produced by ArtePiazza, who had previously worked on ports of the Dragon Quest series. Ichikawa was introduced by ArtePiazza based on this work. He was initially concerned about too many changes; however, ArtePiazza's enthusiasm for the project and its wish to remain faithful to the original assuaged Ichikawa's doubts. While generally faithful, the remaster included animated sprites for the Seven Heroes boss characters as well as a redesigned and adjustable UI that allowed for touchscreen operation and player customization.

The remaster was designed using the Unity game engine, chosen for its convenience when porting to other platforms and user-friendly technology. Similarly, the pixel art resolution was left unaltered, with the team instead enlarging and multiplying the pixels in order to bring the Super Famicom sprites to modern graphical standards. One of the most frequent issues with updating the graphics was creating sharper background designs while preserving the pixel art of players and enemies, while also accounting for the gameplay display and mechanics around enemy encounters. This was done in parts for budgetary reasons and fan love of the original. While the team considered adjusting the game balance to make the game easier, they instead directly ported the earlier mobile re-release. The only adjustments made were further bug fixes. Through all these adjustments, the remaster includes all the code from the Super Famicom original.

Square Enix first released the game in Japan on March 24, 2016 for Android, iOS, and PlayStation Vita. Following the Japanese release, popular demand prompted a Western release of the port. Part of the wish behind the localization were requests from fans worldwide to revive the SaGa series following a prolonged period of dormancy. Ichikawa noted that releasing the game across so many platforms was a new challenge to Square Enix, as Xbox and Steam are popular worldwide but not as popular in Japan. The Western version released first on iOS and Android on May 26, 2016. The Western Vita version was initially delayed due to unspecified issues. On December 15, 2017, it released on Vita, Nintendo Switch, PlayStation 4, Windows, and Xbox One. These later versions included auto save and an option to turn off the remaster's additional content; the ports to Microsoft platforms have Xbox Play Anywhere support whereas the Sony ones feature cross save between Vita and PS4.

=== Remake ===
Romancing SaGa 2: Revenge of the Seven
- Developer: Xeen
- Publisher: Square Enix
- Director: Tadayuki Akiyama
- Producer: Shinichi Tatsuke
- Artist: Yoshiro Ambe
- Composer: Kenji Ito
- Series: SaGa
- Engine: Unreal Engine 4
- Platforms: Nintendo Switch, Nintendo Switch 2, PlayStation 4, PlayStation 5, Windows, Xbox Series S and X
- Release: Switch, PS4, PS5, Windows; October 24, 2024; Switch 2 July 31, 2025; Xbox Series X/S; September 25, 2025
- Genre: Role-playing
- Mode: Single-player

A 3D remake of the game, titled Romancing SaGa 2: Revenge of the Seven, was developed by Xeen and published by Square Enix. Producer Shinichi Tatsuke, who had worked on the 2020 remake of Trials of Mana, was approached by Kawazu and Ichikawa about working on a SaGa remake, with the aim of making the series more accessible worldwide. Romancing SaGa 2 was the first full remake of a SaGa title since Romancing SaGa: Minstrel Song (2006). Full production began near the end of 2021, using feedback from the Trials of Mana remake as guidance for designing Revenge of the Seven. The subtitle is a reference to the expanded story elements showing the main antagonists' motivation through flashbacks. Ito was asked to return to both arrange the soundtrack for the remake and create new tracks. Tatsuke felt the original was severely limited due to hardware limitations and asked Ito to create a "richer, more modern arrangement" for Revenge of the Seven.

While Kawazu gave input on what mechanics to include, Tatsuke was given substantial creative freedom when creating the remake, though he needed to reassure Kawazu after a rumor spread that he was changing the game into an action-based title. For the expansions to the Seven Heroes' narrative, Kawazu's story work for Emperors SaGa and Lord of Vermilion was used as a basis. He remembered there were discussions between Xeen staff and Kawazu over what a SaGa game should be like, with Tatsuke acting as an intermediary; these ranged from gameplay mechanics to the 3D designs for monsters. The team included multiple difficulty options to make the game more accessible to players, since the SaGa series' high difficulty had been a barrier for some potential players, and tutorials to explain unusual mechanics such as Inheritance. They also made enemy weaknesses visible to players during combat, something absent in the original, and adjusted enemy scaling to reflect later SaGa titles.

Speaking about the technical aspects of developing the remake, director Tadayuki Akiyama described the essential components of the game they wished to carry over−the free scenario system, the rotating cast and level-scaling based on combat encounters−while updating systems for modern platforms. While free-form quest designs had become established in other games, the non-linear style and scope of Romancing SaGa 2 required the team to implement quest flags based on areas rather than tying them to specific isolated quest chains. The team faced a number of technical issues such as the amount of save data required, which was much larger due to the number and structure of quests, and how enemies would behave and scale in a 3D environment. The gameplay and world design issues required consultation with Square Enix before any changes were made, as the team wanted to be faithful to the original. The game was developed using Unreal Engine 4, which also proved challenging due to the number of distinct characters needing to be animated and held in memory.

When choosing the graphical style, the team opted for a stylised anime-based aesthetic to match earlier SaGa titles. Compared to the Trials of Mana remake, the team injected more realism to the design in order to reflect the game's tone. Environments have shadow effects and characters are taller with more realistic proportions. Yoshiro Anbe, who had designed character classes for the Trials of Mana remake, reworked Kobayashi's character designs for the game. Anbe was already a fan of the series and its character designs, and after seeing a draft design in the new style, Tatsuke felt Anbe was "a perfect fit". To ensure consistent art direction, Anbe designed all the in-game characters, including non-playable ones. The designs of Kobayashi's that did not translate well to 3D graphics were adjusted, such as changing outfit colors to look better in 3D. The Seven Heroes kept their original battle poses from their 2D sprite form, something the game's design director insisted on.

Revenge of the Seven was released on October 24, 2024 for Nintendo Switch, PlayStation 4, PlayStation 5, and Windows through Steam. Those who pre-ordered the game were given access to cat-themed accessories that granted gameplay boosts. A Nintendo Switch 2 version was released on July 31, 2025, both as a standalone release and a paid upgrade option for owners of the Switch version. Alongside this version, the game was patched to address gameplay issues, adjust balancing, expand New Game Plus options, and fix bugs. It was released on Xbox Series X and Series S consoles and a new Windows version through the Microsoft store on September 25, 2025, with support for the Xbox Play Anywhere function.

== Reception ==
Reviews (Original)

Aggregate score
Aggregator	Score
Metacritic	70/100 (NS); 71/100 (PS4); 62/100 (XONE)

Review scores
Publication	Score
Famitsu	8/10, 5/10, 7/10, 6/10
GameRevolution	4/5
Nintendo Life	7/10
Nintendo World Report	7/10
Push Square	6/10
RPGamer	4/5
RPGFan	75%
TouchArcade	4.5/5

Prior to release, Romancing SaGa 2 was highly antipicated in Japan. It was consistently the most wanted title on Famitsu's list of expected releases from September 27, 1993 through November 14, 1993. The original release topped the Famitsu sales chart in December 1993. Romancing SaGa 2 went on to sell nearly 1.5 million copies as of March 2003. It is the best-selling entry in the original Romancing SaGa trilogy, followed by the original game and Romancing SaGa 3. Reception of the remaster was varied; according to review aggregate website Metacritic, the PS4 and Switch versions saw generally positive reviews, while the Xbox version saw a mixed response. Nintendo World Report's Bryan Rose summed up the game as having "a certain old school charm that invites any old school RPG fan to give it a shot", while Alana Hagues of RPGFan described the game as "equal parts fascinating and frustrating".

The original's gameplay design was generally praised. The reviewers for Famitsu praised the gameplay as addictive and entertaining once they got a grasp of the systems, and TouchArcade's Shaun Musgrave positively highlighted the game as different from other Square Enix mobile titles at the time while faulting its balancing and lack of tutorials. Michael Baker of RPGamer lauded its mechanics but felt the difficulty could be off-putting, while Hagues—despite enjoying the combat—criticised its lack of guidance and difficulty spikes. Rose positively noted the amount options players had to experiment with, Liam Dolan of Nintendo Life highlighted the character customisation and combat system as a major reason he kept on playing, while Cody Perez of GameRevolution negatively noted the high number of enemy encounters despite enjoying the game's overall design. Robert Ramsey of Push Square felt that the game was undermined by poor balancing and the lack of a conventional leveling system.

The presentation was generally well received. Hagues positively noted the music in her review, and Baker called the final boss theme "one of the best of its generation". When mentioned, the remaster's graphical upgrade was praised, but its controls and menu design were often faulted. By contrast Perez described both the sound and art design as "repetitive and forgettable". Commenting on the localization, Musgrave noted grammar and spelling mistakes, negatively comparing it to early localizations from Square.

In contrast, the story saw less favourable responses. Ramsey felt the game's "rather unique approach to storytelling" set it apart from other titles of its time, Perez praised the free scenario system as setting the game apart from others of its time, but Rose felt lacked interesting stories or characters to hook her. Dolan felt the story and dialogue lacking despite the original premise, Baker felt there were no characters he could become attached to beyond its opening and ending sections, and two reviewers from Famitsu highlighted the characters as difficult to connect with compared to the fate of Avalon as a whole.

=== Revenge of the Seven ===
Reviews (Revenge of the Seven)

Aggregate score
Aggregator	Score
Metacritic	82/100 (NS/PC); 79/100 (PS5/NS2)

Review scores
Publication	Score
Famitsu	8/10, 9/10, 10/10, 9/10
GameSpot	8/10
Nintendo Life	6/10
Nintendo World Report	9/10
RPGamer	4.5/5
RPGFan	95%
RPG Site	8/10

During its first week on sale in Japan, Revenge of the Seven sold over 114,000 physical units across Switch, PS4, and PS5, with all three versions appearing in the top ten best-selling titles for that week. As of October 2026, Revenge of the Seven had sold over one million copies worldwide physically and digitally. According to Metacritic, the game saw generally positive reviews, with the Switch and PC versions seeing higher overall scores compared to the PS5 and Switch 2 releases.

The storyline and characters were described as weak due to how the game was structured, although other critics praised the original premise of focusing on the world over a central cast. Several critics described the added timeline and United Attack mechanics as sound additions to the combat system, but its quest design and some gameplay elements were often described as lacking explanation. Both Kemps and Yang found late-game battles became protracted or overly difficult. The arranged soundtrack and addition of voice acting met with general praise. Performance issues were noted for the Switch version.

Jordan Rudek of Nintendo World Report was very positive about the game, citing it as one of his favourite games of 2024 and highlighting its gameplay design and amount of player freedom. RPGFan's Ben Love summed up the game as "the ideal RPG remake", praising its gameplay variety across its storyline and feeling that the transition to 3D gave increased grandeur and depth to its world and systems. Famitsu lauded the game's 3D transition and the accommodations made for new players, though one reviewer felt the game was slower to play compared to the original version. RPG Site's Scott White noted that the game would not be for everyone due to its unconventional systems, he described it as a comfort game for him due to enjoying its gameplay depth and variety.

Heidi Kemps, writing for GameSpot, praised the game's reworked presentation and accessibility options as making the game more enjoyable while preserving the original mechanics, while echoing sentiments surrounding its obtuse mechanics. Michael Apps of RPGamer focused much of his praise on the gameplay and world design, finding them the strongest aspects of the game, while finding its Inheritance mechanic undermined the story potential for the cast after the opening. George Yang of Nintendo Life felt that the gameplay was interesting and unique, but summed up the game as an "underwhelming RPG" due to lacking strong characters, finding its new mechanics underused, and disliking its graphical upgrade and technical issues.

== Legacy ==
Romancing SaGa 2 has become a fan favorite within the SaGa series and introduced a number of gameplay elements that would continue to be used going forward, such as formations and maneuvers like parrying. Western journalists have noted its gameplay design and narrative structure in relation to later role-playing games. Within the SaGa series, the game served as the model for two spin-off projects: Emperors SaGa in 2012, and Imperial SaGa in 2015.

=== Related media ===
Tokuma Shoten published three volumes of a manga adaptation between August 1994 and April 1995. The first volume was written by Hiroshi Morimoto, while the rest was written by Mayumi Hazuki. Kazuki Mendo illustrated all volumes. A stage play based on the game's setting that focused on the Seven Heroes was produced between September to October 2018. Kawazu created the initial premise, and the script was written by Moku Tochibori. It was directed by Atsuhiro Sato, who also played the lead role. Ito produced both new music and new arrangements from the game's soundtrack for the play.
