= SaGa =

Video game series

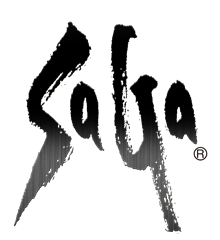
- Recurring version of the SaGa logo
- Genre: Role-playing
- Developers: Square; Square Enix
- Publishers: Square; Square Enix
- Creator: Akitoshi Kawazu
- Platforms: Game Boy, Super NES, PlayStation, WonderSwan Color, PlayStation 2, Mobile, Nintendo DS, Android, iOS, PlayStation Vita, Windows, Nintendo Switch, PlayStation 4, Xbox One, PlayStation 5, Nintendo Switch 2, Xbox Series X/S
- First release: The Final Fantasy Legend; December 15, 1989
- Latest release: Romancing SaGa 2: Revenge of the Seven; October 24, 2024

SaGa (サガ) is a series of science fantasy role-playing video games by Square Enix. The series originated on the Game Boy in 1989 as the creation of Akitoshi Kawazu at Square. It has since continued across multiple platforms, including the Super NES, PlayStation 2, mobile phones, PCs, and modern consoles. The series is notable for its emphasis on open world exploration, non-linear branching plots, and occasionally unconventional gameplay.

== Development ==
Release timeline
1989	The Final Fantasy Legend
1990	Final Fantasy Legend II
1991	Final Fantasy Legend III
1992	Romancing SaGa
1993	Romancing SaGa 2
1994
1995	Romancing SaGa 3
1996
1997	SaGa Frontier
1998
1999	SaGa Frontier 2
2000–2001
2002	Unlimited Saga
2003–2004
2005	Romancing SaGa: Minstrel Song (remake)
2006–2008
2009	SaGa 2 Hihō Densetsu: Goddess of Destiny (remake)
2010
2011	SaGa 3 Jikū no Hasha: Shadow or Light (remake)
2012	Emperors SaGa
2013–2014
2015	Imperial SaGa
2016	SaGa: Scarlet Grace
2017
2018	Romancing SaGa Re;univerSe
2019	Imperial SaGa Eclipse
2020–2023
2024	SaGa: Emerald Beyond
2024	Romancing SaGa 2: Revenge of the Seven (remake)
2025–2026
2027	Romancing SaGa 3: Destinies United (remake)

The SaGa series was created by game designer Akitoshi Kawazu, whose contributions prior to the franchise's introduction include Final Fantasy and Final Fantasy II. At a time when Nintendo's Game Boy was becoming popular worldwide due to the puzzle game Tetris, then-Square president Masafumi Miyamoto requested that a development team create a game for the handheld console. Kawazu and fellow designer Koichi Ishii suggested that the company develop a role-playing video game, thus making Makai Toushi Sa·Ga, later released in North America as The Final Fantasy Legend, the company's first handheld title. The gameplay was designed to be difficult, described by Kawazu as the main difference between the SaGa and Final Fantasy series. Tomomi Kobayashi created character illustrations for the franchise.

== Common elements ==
The SaGa series emphasizes nonlinear gameplay and open world exploration, with its open-ended branching plot and free style of character development separating it from the more linear Final Fantasy series. Except for Romancing SaGa Re;univerSe (the sequel to Romancing SaGa 3), the story in each SaGa game is independent of its counterpart games.

The SaGa series is also considered a successor to Final Fantasy II, which introduced a more open-ended activity-based progression system that was abandoned by later Final Fantasy games but embraced by Makai Toushi SaGa (The Final Fantasy Legend), which expanded it with weapons that shatter with repeated use and added new ideas such as a race of monsters that mutate depending on which fallen foes they consume.

The early games in the series also feature some common gameplay elements and themes first established in Final Fantasy, such as random enemy encounters, but most of these disappear with the Romancing SaGa games, providing a unique gameplay experience. It also features a similar turn-based battle system, where a character's prowess is driven by numerical values called "statistics" which, in turn, increase with combat experience. Given the open-ended aspect of gameplay and the ability to play through multiple character scenarios, heavy emphasis is placed upon the replay value of SaGa games.

Since the original Makai Toushi SaGa, much of the series has relied on loosely connected stories and sidequests rather than an epic narrative. Makai Toushi SaGa allowed players to travel through different worlds. Romancing SaGa expanded the open-endedness by offering many choices and allowing players to complete quests in any order, with the decision of whether or not to participate in any particular quest affecting the outcome of the storyline. The game also allowed players to choose from eight different characters, each with their own stories that start in different places and offer different outcomes. Romancing SaGa thus succeeded in providing a very different experience during each run through the game, something that later non-linear RPGs such as SaGa Frontier and Fable had promised but were unable to live up to. It also introduced a combo system where up to five party members can perform a combined special attack, and required characters to pay mentors to teach them abilities, whether it is using certain weapons or certain proficiencies like opening a chest or dismantling a trap.

While in the original Romancing SaGa, scenarios were changed according to dialogue choices during conversations, Romancing SaGa 2 further expanded the open-endedness by having unique storylines for each character that can change depending on the player's actions, including who is chosen, what is said in conversation, what events have occurred, and who is present in the party. Romancing SaGa 3 featured a storyline that could be told differently from the perspectives of up to eight different characters and introduced a level-scaling system where the enemies get stronger as the characters do, a mechanic that was later used in Final Fantasy VIII, The Elder Scrolls IV: Oblivion, Silverfall, Dragon Age: Origins, Fallout 3, and The Elder Scrolls V: Skyrim. SaGa Frontier further expanded on the non-linear gameplay of its Romancing SaGa predecessors, with a setting that spans multiple planets and an overarching plot that becomes apparent after playing through each of the different characters' quests that tie together at certain places.

== Games ==
=== Mainline ===
Title	Original release date		
Title	Japan	North America	PAL region
The Final Fantasy Legend	December 15, 1989	September 30, 1990	December 19, 2020 (Collection)
Notes: Released on Game Boy; Developed by Square; Also available on Wonderswan Color (2002), i-mode (2007), EZweb (2007), SoftBank Mobile (2008), Nintendo Switch (2020), Android (2021), iOS (2021), Windows (2021); Known in Japan as Makai Toushi Sa・Ga; The first RPG on a handheld video game console, and the first handheld game with a battery save feature. The game introduces new systems of developing characters. The game was released in North America less than a year later as The Final Fantasy Legend to boost sales on the strength of Final Fantasy's name, something also done with the Mana series. An enhanced remake of the game was released exclusively in Japan in 2002 for the WonderSwan Color and 2007 for mobile phones, sporting more advanced graphics than those displayed by the Game Boy's four-color set. In 2020, it was included in the Collection of SaGa: Final Fantasy Legend.
Final Fantasy Legend II	December 14, 1990	November 1991	December 19, 2020 (Collection)
Notes: Released on Game Boy; Developed by Square; Also available on Nintendo Switch (2020), Android (2021), iOS (2021), Windows (2021); Known in Japan as Sa・Ga 2: Hihō Densetsu; The game retains the same character classes used in its predecessor, but introduces a fifth ally that often helps the player's party in combat. The game's story is more developed than the first SaGa game, with a journey that spans across more than a dozen worlds. GameSpot's "History of Console RPGs" touts Final Fantasy Legend II as the best of the Game Boy SaGa games, calling it a "portable gaming classic". An enhanced remake of the game was released in Japan in 2009 for the Nintendo DS. In 2020, it was included in the Collection of SaGa: Final Fantasy Legend.
Final Fantasy Legend III	December 13, 1991	August 1993	December 19, 2020 (Collection)
Notes: Released on Game Boy; Developed by Square; Also available on Nintendo Switch (2020), Android (2021), iOS (2021), Windows (2021); Known in Japan as Sa・Ga 3: Jikū no Hasha; The game eliminates the non-level-based individualized growth system of the previous two installments; instead, the title introduces "experience points" and across-the-board stat leveling in the style of Final Fantasy, introducing two human and two mutant characters with predetermined backgrounds. An enhanced remake of the game was released in Japan on January in 2011 for the Nintendo DS. In 2020, it was included in the Collection of SaGa: Final Fantasy Legend.
Romancing SaGa	January 28, 1992	none	none
Notes: Released on Super Famicom; Developed by Square; Also available on Wonderswan Color (2001), i-mode (2009), SoftBank Mobile (2009), EZweb (2009); The first of three Japan-exclusive Super Famicom titles, the game allows the player to choose from one of eight character scenarios to follow. The game was ported to the WonderSwan Color in 2001. An enhanced remake of the game was released in 2005 for the PlayStation 2, which was released outside Japan. A mobile phone version was released in 2009.
Romancing SaGa 2	December 10, 1993	December 15, 2017 (Remaster)	December 15, 2017 (Remaster)
Notes: Released on Super Famicom; Developed by Square, remastered by ArtePiazza; Also available on EZweb (2011), i-mode (2011), Android (2016), iOS (2016), PlayStation Vita (2016), Nintendo Switch (2017), PlayStation 4 (2017), Windows (2017), Xbox One (2017); The second installment in the Romancing SaGa series and the fifth in the SaGa series in general, the game places a greater emphasis on storyline than its predecessors. The story plays out across generations, so the player cannot keep one party of warriors throughout the game. A remastered version, released between 2016 and 2017, marks the first release of the game outside Japan.
Romancing SaGa 3	November 11, 1995	November 11, 2019 (Remaster)	November 11, 2019 (Remaster)
Notes: Released on Super Famicom; Developed by Square, remastered by ArtePiazza; Also available on Android (2019), iOS (2019), Nintendo Switch (2019), PlayStation 4 (2019), PlayStation Vita (2019), Windows (2019), Xbox One (2019); The third Romancing SaGa game features a battle system similar to that of Final Fantasy II and the first two SaGa games, where character development is determined by the player's commands in battle. If the player commands a character to cast magic spells frequently, for example, then that character will grow in magical power. A remastered version, released in 2019, marks the first release of the game outside Japan.
SaGa Frontier	July 11, 1997	March 31, 1998	April 15, 2021 (Remaster)
Notes: Released on PlayStation; Developed by Square, remastered by Bullets; Also available on Android (2021), iOS (2021), Nintendo Switch (2021), PlayStation 4 (2021), Windows (2021); This installment was both the first SaGa game to be released in North America since Final Fantasy Legend III in 1993 and the first of the series to be released in North America as a SaGa game. Similar in style to the earlier games in the series, SaGa Frontier allows the player to choose from multiple characters, each with his or her own unique storyline and scenario. A remastered version was released in 2021.
SaGa Frontier 2	April 1, 1999	January 31, 2000	March 22, 2000
Notes: Released on PlayStation; Developed by Square, remastered by Bullets; Also available on Android (2025), iOS (2025), Nintendo Switch (2025), PlayStation 4 (2025), PlayStation 5 (2025), Windows (2025); The game was the first SaGa title to reach PAL territories and was one of Square's last RPGs produced for the PlayStation. The game shuns 3D graphics in favor of traditional 2D hand-painted watercolor sprites. The game features two separate storylines spanning three generations. A remastered version was released in 2025.
Unlimited Saga	December 19, 2002	June 17, 2003	October 31, 2003
Notes: Released on PlayStation 2; Developed by Square; The game features a combination of 2D and 3D graphics known as "Sketch Motion" and a complicated battle mechanic called the "Reel System". It greatly resembles a board game. It was praised highly in Japan, but garnered heavy criticism elsewhere.
SaGa: Scarlet Grace	December 15, 2016	December 3, 2019 (Ambitions)	December 3, 2019 (Ambitions)
Notes: Released on PlayStation Vita; Developed by Square Enix; Also available on Android (2018), iOS (2018), Windows (2018), Nintendo Switch (2019), PlayStation 4 (2019); The game was announced in December 2014 and released in Japan in 2016. An enhanced version, titled SaGa Scarlet Grace: Ambitions, was released in Japan in 2018, and for the first time in the West in 2019.
SaGa: Emerald Beyond	April 25, 2024	April 25, 2024	April 25, 2024
Notes: Released on Android, iOS, Nintendo Switch, PlayStation 4, PlayStation 5, Windows; Developed by Square Enix; A standalone title featuring a cast of six protagonists in 17 interconnected worlds with initially separate stories (note: two of the six main characters are a pair working together). These characters possess the ability to see "emerald waves" that connect the 17 worlds through the "Beyond," a hub of the emerald waves. The game features a freeform scenario system with branching story possibilities based on player choices and actions and a turn-based combat system.

=== Remakes ===
Title	Original release date		
Title	Japan	North America	PAL region
Romancing SaGa: Minstrel Song	April 21, 2005	October 11, 2005	December 1, 2022 (Remaster)
Notes: Released on PlayStation 2; Also available on Android (2022), iOS (2022), Nintendo Switch (2022), PlayStation 4 (2022), PlayStation 5 (2022), Windows (2022); Developed by Square Enix, remastered by Bullets; A full 3D remake of Romancing SaGa (Super Famicom), it was released as simply Romancing SaGa in North America. A remastered version, titled Romancing SaGa: Minstrel Song Remastered was released in 2022, with an updated release, Romancing SaGa: Minstrel Song Remastered International, launched for consoles in 2025.
SaGa 2 Hihō Densetsu: Goddess of Destiny	September 17, 2009	none	none
Notes: Released on Nintendo DS; Developed by Racjin; A full 3D remake of Final Fantasy Legend II (Game Boy). It added multiplayer, new events, and new gameplay elements, such as team-up attacks, defined growth bonuses for characters and no random encounters.
SaGa 3 Jikū no Hasha: Shadow or Light	January 6, 2011	none	none
Notes: Released on Nintendo DS; Developed by Racjin; A full 3D remake of Final Fantasy Legend III (Game Boy). To align the game closer with the rest of the series, the story and gameplay were more substantially changed than the previous remake. The experience points were removed in favor of a growth system like other SaGa titles.
Romancing SaGa 2: Revenge of the Seven	October 24, 2024	October 24, 2024	October 24, 2024
Notes: Released on Nintendo Switch, PlayStation 4, PlayStation 5, Windows; Also available on Nintendo Switch 2 (2025), Xbox Series X/S (2025); Developed by Xeen; A full 3D remake of Romancing SaGa 2 (Super Famicom).

=== Others ===
Title	Original release date		
Title	Japan	North America	PAL region
Emperors SaGa	September 18, 2012	none	none
Notes: Released on GREE, Mobage, NTT DoCoMo; Developed by Square Enix; Announced in September 2011, the game features a combat system utilizing digital playing cards. As of April 2017, the game is no longer available.
Imperial SaGa	June 18, 2015	none	none
Notes: Released on Web browser; Developed by Think & Feel; Announced in December 2014 for release in 2015. A single-player game played in the user's web browser, it features a new story within the SaGa setting. The service ceased in 2019.
Romancing SaGa Re;univerSe	December 6, 2018	June 24, 2020	June 24, 2020
Notes: Released on Android, iOS; Developed by Square Enix; Smartphone title released in 2018 in Japan and released in the rest of the world in 2020. It features a new story set 300 years after Romancing SaGa 3, characters from previous games and some of the characteristic elements from the series. As of November 2019, the game has been downloaded more than 15 million times.
Imperial SaGa Eclipse	October 31, 2019	none	none
Notes: Released in Japan for Android, iOS, Windows; Developed by DMM GAMES
Vampire Survivors: Emerald Diorama	April 10, 2025	April 10, 2025	April 10, 2025
Notes: Released on macOS, Windows, Xbox One, Xbox Series X/S, Nintendo Switch, Android, iOS, PlayStation 4, PlayStation 5; Developed by Poncle; Downloadable content pack for the 2022 video game Vampire Survivors. It adds 16 characters, 16 weapons, and a new stage all based on SaGa: Emerald Beyond. The "glimmer" mechanic from the SaGa series is adapted in the DLC, allowing SaGa weapons to perform special attacks.

== Music ==
Music in the SaGa series have been composed by a number of people, the most prominent of which is Kenji Ito, who also composed some soundtracks for the Mana series. Nobuo Uematsu, responsible for a large portion of the music of the Final Fantasy series, solely composed The Final Fantasy Legend and co-composed Final Fantasy Legend II with Ito. Ryuji Sasai and Chihiro Fujioka worked on Final Fantasy Legend III together. SaGa Frontier 2 and Unlimited Saga are credited to Masashi Hamauzu.

== Reception ==
Review scores and sales
Game	Platform	Units sold (millions)	Famitsu score	GameRankings score
The Final Fantasy Legend	Game Boy	1.3	35/40	51% (4 reviews)
Final Fantasy Legend II	Game Boy	—	33/40	90% (2 reviews)
Final Fantasy Legend III	Game Boy	—	29/40	75% (3 reviews)
Romancing SaGa	Super Famicom	1.32	31/40	—
Romancing SaGa 2	Super Famicom	1.5	26/40	—
Romancing SaGa 3	Super Famicom	1.3	34/40	—
SaGa Frontier	PlayStation	1.1	31/40	71% (11 reviews)
SaGa Frontier 2	PlayStation	0.68	35/40	74% (27 reviews)
Unlimited Saga	PlayStation 2	0.44	31/40	52% (43 reviews)
Romancing SaGa: Minstrel Song	PlayStation 2	0.45	32/40	63% (30 reviews)

Games in the SaGa series have been popular in Japan, with many of them selling over 1 million units. As of March 2011, the series has sold over 9.9 million units. In 2006, Famitsu readers voted Romancing SaGa as the 53rd best game of all time, and SaGa 2 as the 94th best game of all time. Games in the series also received generally positive reviews from Japanese publications such as Famitsu and Dengeki. As of 2019, the series has sold over 10 million units.

However, the series has remained decidedly less popular in North America, many of the games receiving mixed reviews from printed and online publications. It has been suggested that this is due to the series' seemingly experimental gameplay and allowing the player to freely roam with little direction or narrative, atypical of what many North American gamers usually expect from Japanese role-playing games. In their September 2004 "Overrated/Underrated" article, Official U.S. PlayStation Magazine cited the SaGa series as one ruined in the transition to the PlayStation 2, citing primarily Unlimited SaGa.

== See also ==
- The Legend of Legacy - a spiritual sequel made by some of the past SaGa staff.
  - The Alliance Alive - a second game made by some of the past SaGa staff.
- List of Square Enix video game franchises
