= Romancing SaGa =

1992 video game

- Super Famicom box art
- Developer: Square (Note: WonderSwan Color port developed by Kai Navi. PlayStation 2 remake developed by Square Enix.)
- Publishers: Square (1992–2001); Square Enix
- Director: Akitoshi Kawazu
- Producer: Masafumi Miyamoto
- Designer: Akitoshi Kawazu
- Artist: Tomomi Kobayashi
- Writer: Akitoshi Kawazu
- Composer: Kenji Ito
- Series: SaGa
- Platforms: Super Famicom: WonderSwan Color; PlayStation 2; i-mode; SoftBank Mobile; EZweb; Android; iOS; Nintendo Switch; PlayStation 4; PlayStation 5; Windows
- Release: January 28, 1992: Super Famicom; JP: January 28, 1992 WonderSwan Color; JP: December 20, 2001 PlayStation 2; JP: April 21, 2005; NA: October 11, 2005 i-Mode; JP: March 5, 2009 SoftBank 3G; JP: March 18, 2009 EZweb; JP: July 9, 2009 Android, iOS, Nintendo Switch, PlayStation 4, PlayStation 5, Windows; WW: December 1, 2022
- Genre: Role-playing
- Mode: Single-player

Romancing SaGa (Note: Romanshingu Sa・Ga (Japanese: ロマンシング サ・ガ)) is a 1992 role-playing video game developed and published by Square for the Super Famicom. It is the fourth entry in the SaGa series. It was subsequently released for the WonderSwan Color in 2001 and mobile phones in 2009. A remake for the PlayStation 2, subtitled Minstrel Song in Japan, was released in both Japan and North America in 2005 by Square Enix. A remaster of Minstrel Song was released worldwide in 2022 for Android, iOS, Nintendo Switch, PlayStation 4, PlayStation 5 and Windows.

The storyline follows eight different protagonists on quests through the world of Mardias, all culminating in a fight against the dark god Saruin. Gameplay features nonlinear exploration of the game world, with the turn-based battles featuring group formations. As with other SaGa titles, there are no experience points and character attributes and skills are dependent on actions taken in battle.

Production began in 1990, with Nintendo requesting Square develop a new SaGa entry for the in-production Super Famicom after the success of SaGa titles on the Game Boy. Series creator Akitoshi Kawazu acted as director, designer and scenario writer. The character designers were created by Tomomi Kobayashi in her first work for the series. The music was solely composed and arranged by Kenji Ito, who had previously co-composed music for Final Fantasy Legend II.

Later versions included cut content and features from later SaGa titles. The PS2 remake included redrawn artwork by Yusuke Naora and a redone soundtrack from Ito. The Super Famicom version sold over one million copies, and met with positive reception in the region. The PS2 remake sold 500,000 units across Japan and North America, seeing mixed reviews in the West due to its difficulty and art style. The remaster saw some praise for its updates, but several found it unwelcoming for series newcomers. Two more Romancing SaGa titles were developed, and gameplay elements from Romancing SaGa would be used in subsequent SaGa titles.

== Gameplay ==
A battle in the original Romancing SaGa

Romancing SaGa is a role-playing video game where the player takes on the role of eight different protagonists, playing through their narratives and an overarching story in a nonlinear style. After choosing a protagonist, the player explores the game's overworld freely, triggering narrative events, engaging in battles, and performing side activities. Over the course of the game a party of characters is built up, with some recruitable members being the unchosen protagonists. Progression of the main narrative is based on the number of events the player completes, their current strength, and speaking to certain characters. This free exploration is dubbed the Free Scenario System.

Battles trigger when the player encounters enemy sprites in field and dungeon environments. The party engages the enemy in a preset formation arranged on a 3x3 grid, which impacts both attack range and defence from enemies. Equipment for playable characters includes their current weapon and armour. Abilities use a pool of Battle Points (BP). There are no experience points, with character statistics raising at random based on actions in battle. New abilities are unlocked by using weapons enough times in battle. Winning the battle also grants the player money, used to buy items and equipment. If a party member falls, they will return to low health at the end of battle. If the entire party falls, the game ends.

The PlayStation 2 (PS2) remake Minstrel Song retains the original narrative and many gameplay concepts including non-linear exploration, but all environments are rendered in 3D and elements from later SaGa titles are incorporated. As with the original, once the protagonist is chosen, they can progress as they like through the scenario. The game uses a quick save function, creating a temporary save when the party is in field or dungeon environments. Hard saves can only be done in towns, where merchants selling new weapons and equipment can be utilised.

The player can customise their party through which characters they recruit, and character classes that impact abilities and statistics, magical schools that allow the blending of different elemental magic types, and weapon forging. In addition to statistics rising depending on battle actions, a character learns or upgrades their skills by using it multiple times in battle. If several party members focus on one enemy, they unlock a Combination attack. Character health is two-layered, with standard health and Life Points. LP are limited in number and only renewed by resting at an inn. A character loses LP by being knocked out enough times or through attacks which target LP; if the player character loses all LP, the game ends.

== Synopsis ==
Romancing SaGa is set in the fictional world of Mardias. One thousand years before the game's opening, a war raged between three evil gods—Death, Saruin, and Schirach—and the benevolent deity Elore. By the end, Death and Schirach are stripped of their powers, while Saruin is imprisoned through the combined effort of ten Fatestones and the sacrifice of the hero Mirsa. The Fatestones become scattered through the world, and the powers of darkness gather themselves to free Saruin from his imprisonment.

The game focuses on eight characters, each with their own narrative who are drawn into the quest to recover the Fatestones and defeat Saruin once more. They are Albert, heir to a noble lord in the region of Rosalia; Aisha, a peace-loving member of the nomadic Taralians; Jamil, a thief operating in the city of Estamir; Claudia, a woman raised by a witch in the land of Mazewood; Hawk, a notorious pirate; Sif, a warrior from the snow-covered region of Valhalland; Gray, a treasure-seeking adventurer; and Barbara, member of a travelling band of entertainers.

While each character has their own personal quest, they are drawn into the quest for the Fatestones. In Minstrel Song, the characters are overseen in their quest by the Minstrel, a figure who is secretly an avatar of Elore. Once enough Fatestones are collected, the chosen protagonist faces the reawakened Saruin, defeating him for good. If Minstrel Song is cleared with all eight characters, a final scene shows them talking together, then setting out as a group watched over by the Minstrel.

== Development ==
Production of Romancing SaGa began in 1990, when Nintendo approached series developer Square about developing a new SaGa title for their in-development Super Famicom. The request was due to the success of the previous SaGa titles on the Game Boy. Series creator Akitoshi Kawazu was pleased at Nintendo's request, as he could make substantial improvements to his gameplay design on better hardware. There was also demand for a third Game Boy SaGa, so two projects began in parallel; Kawazu led a team on Romancing SaGa, while Square's new Osaka studio developed Final Fantasy Legend III (known in Japan as SaGa 3: Jikuu no Hasha). During early production, Kawazu wanted to break away from the SaGa brand and call the game something different, but ultimately it retained the SaGa name. The game's "Romancing" title was suggested by Nobuyuki Inoue, inspired by the adventure movie Romancing the Stone. Kawazu was a little mixed on the impression given by the title, but the illustrations and music helped make the game more in line with the "romantic" style implied by the title. Kawazu acted as director, lead designer, and scenario writer. The producer was Masafumi Miyamoto, founder and former president of Square.

Production was difficult, as while Kawazu had a larger team to work with, they also faced new technical and design issues. Kawazu's aim was to change the gameplay style of having a single path players had to travel, instead creating multiple stories for players to experience at their own pace, giving birth to the Free Scenario System. The Free Scenario System was designed as a direct contrast to the linear story structure of Square's Final Fantasy series. The eight protagonists, with their own stories within the same world, drew inspiration from taiga dramas, with the number referencing the Japanese novel Nansō Satomi Hakkenden. Albert's scenario was the first to be written. The number of characters was also due to Kawazu's wish for the formation system. The narrative was difficult for Kawazu, as he needed to create a central plotline while crafting eight independent narratives. Due to Nintendo's strict cart size limitations, several planned elements had to be cut from the final product.

The characters were designed by artist Tomomi Kobayashi. Kawazu had been looking for a suitable illustrator for some time, and when he saw samples of Kobayashi's work contacted her about working with him. Romancing SaGa was Kobayashi's first video game work, so she had to get used to the large amount of creative freedom she had compared to her previous projects. She was only ever sent a name and some elements from Kawazu, but otherwise left to her own devices. Kawazu had a lot of input on what the characters were like, such as Albert being the only left-handed character, but could not have as much influence as he wanted due to other development needs. Hawk's design was inspired by the character Blood from Princess Knight. Kobayashi's favorite characters were Hawk and main antagonist Saruin. Kobayashi designed 40 unique characters, and at the height of her work was designing six per day.

The sprites were designed by Kazuko Shibuya, who had worked for the company since the 1980s and designed character sprites for the Final Fantasy series. She created the character sprites based on Kobayashi's designs. Due to their deep narrative connections, Kawazu asked Kobayashi to design the characters before any sprite work was done. An important part of the sprite design was keeping the "delicate" colours within the limited pixel art style of the game. The game made extensive use of kanji characters, as hiragana writing would take up too much space, but Kawazu needed to make sure the kanji was legible, making them extra-large and going against standard 8x8 pixel limit for writing. Yoshinori Kitase acted as the game's field map designer, creating the world map. The graphic design staff included Inoue, Tetsuya Takahashi and Hiroshi Takai, the latter of whom would work as a designer on future SaGa titles.

== Release and versions ==
Romancing SaGa released on January 28, 1992. It was the second Super Famicom title released by Square, following Final Fantasy IV in 1991. Three guidebooks for the game were published by NTT Publishing under Square's supervision between February and May 1992. A further guidebook, Romancing SaGa Destiny Guide, was published on December 20, 2001, by DigiCube. The game received Virtual Console re-releases on the Wii in 2009, the Wii U in 2015, and the Nintendo 3DS in 2016. Gaming magazine GamePro reported that Romancing SaGa was going to be localised in 1993, releasing under a different title. Ultimately the Super Famicom version of Romancing SaGa went unreleased outside Japan, due to a combination of its potentially off-putting complexity and the amount of text needing translation. An English fan translation patch was released in 2015.

In September 2000, Square announced it had begun development on an enhanced version of Romancing SaGa for the Bandai WonderSwan Color handheld system. The game was ported to the platform by Kan Navi. Square was one of the major supporters for the WonderSwan platform during its tenure. Its non-appearance on the equivalent Game Boy Advance was due to Square and Nintendo's long-standing enmity over Square's break from them to develop for Sony's PlayStation. According to the company, some of the original Super Famicom version's planned material was unable to be added during its original release due to memory restrictions, and that the new hardware would allow for a more "complete" version of the game. The gameplay balance was identical, but they added the ability to dash, avoiding enemy encounters. The newly added material includes an additional story scenario, as well as a side-quest that allows the player to gather all ten "Destiny Stone" items where previously only a few were accessible. The game was released in Japan on December 20, 2001. It formed part of a series dubbed "Square Masterpiece", a series of their classic titles for the WonderSwan platform.

Romancing SaGa was also ported to mobile platforms by Square Enix. This version was based on the WonderSwan port, with some of the graphics adjusted for mobile platforms. It released on March 5, 2009, for i-mode models, March 18 for SoftBank, and July 9, 2009, for EZweb. The mobile version closed in 2018, when the services for older mobile titles were shut down.

=== Romancing SaGa: Minstrel Song ===
A remake for the PlayStation 2, titled Romancing SaGa: Minstrel Song (Note: Romanshingu Sa Ga -Minsutoreru Songu- (ロマンシング サガ -ミンストレルソング-)) in Japan, was developed by Square Enix. Kawazu decided to produce the remake following the release of Unlimited Saga, which had received much feedback due to its experimental gameplay. The remake was developed by Square Enix's Product Development Division 2, carrying over the original staff while aiming to make the game more approachable than the original version. After the approach used in Unlimited Saga, Kawazu designed the game to be a more traditional role-playing experience. Kawazu added in many elements for the remake that he originally planned for Romancing SaGa. The remake featured a number of aesthetic and mechanical changes, originating after Kawazu told the team they could make as many changes as they pleased. Adjustments were made so that players could easily experience all eight character narratives. There were also additional tutorials to explain game mechanics. Kawazu described the purpose of the remake as "a functional compilation of the whole SaGa series" that would combine elements from previous SaGa titles into one definitive game. Kawazu acted as producer and director. Takai returned to help with the game's design.

The art style referenced the sprite design of the original game, which Kawazu called more original than the prevalent realistic style of series like Final Fantasy. It also emerged as an expression of the team's taste, without intending to appeal to the Japanese or international market. It was also described as more "explosive" and expressive than the graphical style of Unlimited Saga. The characters were redrawn by Yusuke Naora, lead artist of Unlimited Saga. A notable added character was the assassin Darque; Kawazu originally meant him as a new protagonist, but he ultimately became a new recruitable character. The graphical style made use of the "sketch motion" techniques used in Unlimited Saga, with the original artwork mapped onto 3D models. Kobayashi returned to create new art, including character sketches based on Naora's redesigns. The game's logo made reference to the Minstrel, a recurring figure in the game.

The game was announced in September 2004 via an issue of Jump, and released in Japan on April 21, 2005. A dedicated guidebook in Square Enix's Ultimania was released on July 17, containing gameplay explanations, a strategy guide, interviews with the production team, and a gallery of promotional and concept art. The Ultimania also included a novella written by Benny Matsumaya, a long-standing contributor to the SaGa series' additional media. The game later re-released through PlayStation Network for PlayStation 3 on April 9, 2015, as a PS2 Classic. Its release, together with a special edition which included a download code and a jigsaw with an artwork by Kobayashi, formed part of the company's 25th anniversary celebrations of the SaGa series.

A North American release was announced at E3 2005, featuring alongside other major titles from the company including Dragon Quest VIII, Final Fantasy XII and Kingdom Hearts II. The game released in North America on October 11. For its Western release, the "Minstrel Song" subtitle was dropped as the original had never released outside Japan. The English dub was handled by New Generation Pictures, who had collaborated with Square Enix on several titles within the Final Fantasy and Valkyrie Profile series. The localized version received no European release. Due to the existence of Minstrel Song and its Western release, the original title was not remastered as later Romancing SaGa titles were. A remaster of Minstrel Song was announced in May 2022 for Android, iOS, Nintendo Switch, PlayStation 4, PlayStation 5 and Windows. The remaster includes upscaled graphics, improved gameplay and additional elements. The game was released on December 1, 2022.

== Music ==
The music of Romancing SaGa was composed and arranged by Kenji Ito, who had previously worked as co-composer for Final Fantasy Legend II (known in Japan as SaGa 2: Hihō Densetsu) alongside Nobuo Uematsu. Ito had helped with the sound design of Final Fantasy IV, and knew that much of the cartridge space had been taken up with the graphics, impacting the music's quality. Kawazu gave no specific instructions about songs, but often requested rewrites. Ito delivered most of the score before the final four months of production, and then had more rewrite requests. When creating the score, Ito broke away from the musical style of Final Fantasy IV, which had emulated fingerstyle playing, instead emulating slapping with help from sound designer Minoru Akao. Compared to the "smooth" sound of Final Fantasy, Ito described the score of Romancing SaGa as "rough", using different instruments to Uematsu's work. Ito was left completely burnt out after his work on the game. Two soundtrack albums were released in by NTT Publishing; the original soundtrack, and an arrange album. A remaster of the original album was reissued in 2019.

Ito returned as composer and arranger for the PS2 remake. Ito found returning to Romancing SaGa both enjoyable and painful due to the fan expectations and love surrounding the title. A part he enjoyed was allowing tracks to sound as they were intended outside the hardware limitations of the Super Famicom. Ito worked on the revised score for two years, joined in his work by Tsuyoshi Sekito and Kenichiro Fukui. The battle theme "Passionate Rhythm" featured vocal contributions from Kyoko Kishikawa, who had previously worked with Ito and other composers including Yasunori Mitsuda and Yoshitaka Hirota. Square Enix hired singer-songwriter Masayoshi Yamazaki to perform the remake's theme song "Minuet".

== Reception ==
=== Original ===
Reviews (Original)

Review score
Publication	Score
Famitsu	9/10, 8/10, 8/10, 6/10 (SFC)

Upon release, the game topped the Famitsu sales charts from February 1992 to March 1992. By 2002, Romancing SaGa had sold 970,000 copies in Japan, ranking as the fifth best-selling SaGa title at the time. As of 2004, the Super Famicom original has sold over 1.3 million copies worldwide; over 1.1 million were sold in Japan, with further overseas sales adding 150,000.

Famitsu magazine's panel of four reviewers faulted the game's graphics as inferior to those of Final Fantasy, but lauded the freedom of choice given to players through its narrative and gameplay progression. Super Famicom Magazine praised the game's Free Scenario System, which allowed players to repeatedly enjoy the game however they wished. In March 2006, readers of Famitsu voted it the 53rd best video game of all time as part of the magazine's "All Time Top 100" poll. Writing in a 2017 retrospective on the original game, Tristan Ettleman of Vice praised the game's ambitious open-ended structure compared to other titles of the time, but faulted its execution and confusing battle mechanics.

=== Remake ===
Reviews (Minstrel Song)

Aggregate score
Aggregator	Score
Metacritic	58/100

Review scores
Publication	Score
1Up.com	C+
Electronic Gaming Monthly	7/10, 6.5/10, 5/10
Famitsu	32/40
Game Informer	5/10
GamePro	3/5
GameSpot	6/10
Hardcore Gamer	3/5
IGN	6.5/10
Nintendo World Report	7/10
RPGamer	3.5/5
RPGFan	87%

Minstrel Song was the top-selling game in that country between the weeks of May 2 and May 26, 2005. During the first week, it sold around 217,000, coming in ahead of Fire Emblem: Path of Radiance and Nintendogs, and completely selling out in some stores. The game sold enough copies to qualify for Sony's Ultimate Hits label, and was re-released in May 2006 at a budget price. As of January 2006, the game had sold 500,000 units; 450,000 were sold in Japan, and 50,000 in North America.

Famitsu was generally positive, noting the battle system's unconventional mechanics compared to other RPGs and enjoying the remake's faith to the original. While Minstrel Song met with positive reviews in Japan, in the West it saw a mixed response. The game holds a score of 58 out of 100 on review aggregate website Metacritic based on 23 reviews. The gameplay met with a mixed response, with praise going to the world's open-ended nature and battle system, but faulting many design elements and battle mechanics. The reworked character designs were often questioned, with a few critics calling them unsettling or ugly. The music and voice acting divided opinion, with some critics enjoying it, and others faulting it as poor quality.

Jane Pinckard 1Up.com praised the environments, but faulted many other elements from art to mechanics as poorly or confusingly designed, feeling it did little to improve on the mixed reputation of Unlimited Saga. The three reviewers for Electronic Gaming Monthly saw potential in its battle system and world design, but generally faulted it as a poorly constructed RPG. Game Informer's Joe Juba was highly critical, saying there were too many faults and unusual design choices to make the game worth playing. Andrew Reiner, in a second opinion, was still less positive and called the game "a measureless disaster". GamePro praised the art design, but faulted the soundtrack, and found the progression system and design confusing and difficult to enjoy. GameSpot's Greg Mueller called Romancing SaGa "a role-playing game without any substance", faulting its lack of narrative and confusing mechanics. Meghan Sullivan of IGN said the game would appeal to fans of the series, but thought that its unorthodox style and design would likely put off many gamers. By contrast with many reviews, RPGFan's Patrick Gann called it a refreshingly original RPG compared to the majority of titles on the market at the time.

Reviewing the remaster, Chris Shive of Hardcore Gamer noted that several elements of its design once innovative now appeared dated, additionally noting some outdated features such as the fixed camera angle that had not been addressed; he called the game a good offering for SaGa fans but a hard sell for many modern genre gamers. Nintendo World Rerport's Neal Ronaghan disliked the visuals and found some of its mechanics confusing, but praised the soundtrack and battle gameplay, calling it a good entry point into the SaGa series. Murillo Zerbinatto of RPGamer praised its replayability and updates for the remaster, but noted that some of its progression and mechanics would be offputting for casual gamers, summing Minstrel Song Remastered up as "a title packed with nuances and peculiarities that still stand the test of time."

== Legacy ==
Romancing SaGa proved to be a popular and influential title within the series, popularising the SaGa series and introducing mechanics and a scenario structure which would be repeated by later entries. Following the success of Romancing SaGa, two further titles were released for the Super Famicom: Romancing SaGa 2 in 1993, and Romancing SaGa 3 in 1995. A manga series based on Romancing SaGa was released in two volumes by Tokuma Shoten in 1994 and 1995, written and illustrated by Saki Kaori.
