= SaGa: Emerald Beyond =

2024 role-playing video game

- Developer: Square Enix
- Publisher: Square Enix
- Director: Akitoshi Kawazu
- Producer: Masanori Ichikawa
- Programmer: Takashi Isowaki
- Artists: Satoshi Kuramochi; Sara Takahashi
- Writer: Akitoshi Kawazu
- Composer: Kenji Ito
- Series: SaGa
- Platforms: Android; iOS; Nintendo Switch; PlayStation 4; PlayStation 5; Windows
- Release: April 25, 2024
- Genre: Role-playing
- Mode: Single-player

SaGa: Emerald Beyond (Note: Saga: Emerarudo Biyondo (Japanese: サガ エメラルド ビヨンド)) is a 2024 role-playing video game developed and published by Square Enix. An entry in the SaGa series, it was released for Android, iOS, Nintendo Switch, PlayStation 4, PlayStation 5, and Windows. The story follows six protagonists as they traverse multiple worlds connected to a realm called the Beyond. The player explores these worlds in a non-linear order, with each protagonist's storyline progressing by completing quests; depending on a chosen path through the game, the quests or available worlds will change for subsequent playthroughs. Combat uses a turn-based system focusing on timeline manipulation and skill growth dependant on in-game actions.

Planning work for Emerald Beyond began in 2016 after completion of SaGa: Scarlet Grace, with full production beginning in 2018. The development team included series creator Akitoshi Kawazu as director and lead writer, lead artist Satoshi Kuramochi, and Kenji Ito returning as composer. Kawazu's aim was to build on the mechanics of Scarlet Grace, expanding the narrative and gameplay elements. It debuted to low sales, and contributed to Square Enix experiencing a fall in revenue. Journalists mostly praised the combat and soundtrack, but comments were mixed about the presentation and story.

== Gameplay ==
Combat in SaGa: Emerald Beyond is turn-based, with turn order and character positions on the combat timeline influencing elements of battle.

SaGa: Emerald Beyond is a role-playing video game in which players take on the role of a protagonist, one of six split between five campaigns set across a selection of seventeen worlds. Characters explore the worlds, with which ones visited triggering different events and influencing the path forward. Navigating worlds, players can follow different glowing lines dubbed Emerald Waves, which lead to different quests. Worlds are navigated from a top-down perspective, with events and battles represented by cutout symbols; cutscenes play out as conversations between characters represented by static art. The choice of worlds with one protagonist will impact the storyline in that world when revisited in another playthrough either as a new character or replaying as the same character. The player can also choose to leave a world without completing its quest, allowing the player to move onto another world. There is no money in-game, with new equipment being gained through exploration, quest completion, or trading materials. A character dubbed Mr. S also grants rewards for completing in-game challenges.

Once a battle is triggered during world exploration, the player and enemy parties face each other in a themed arena. Battles use a turn-based combat system, with each side able to perform an action per turn. The player's party is arranged in different formations which impact their abilities and tactics. Their actions, which include standard attacks and special abilities such as spells, are dictated by Battle Points (BP), displayed as a line of stars. Depending on the amount of available BP, different actions can be taken, and those characters who cannot be assigned a move skip that turn while guarding. All characters are placed on a timeline, with their position influencing their fighting abilities. Adjacent characters can combine certain attack strings into a combo, with its damage percentage represented by a bar; reaching 150% or more on the bar allows participants to perform another free attack. Successful combos also reduce BP costs on the next turn for participants. If a character is isolated on the timeline, they can perform a Showstopper, a chain of attacks at a lower cost. Some abilities, such as move-specific counters, only activate when the right conditions are met. Party members can use different weapons, such as guns, bladed weapons and fists, with the equipped weapon affecting their character growth and how they can guard against enemies. Depending on the character, armor can be equipped, with both armor and weapons upgradable using materials gained through trading.

Similar to earlier SaGa titles, there is no traditional experience point system, with new abilities being learned in battle through a random Glimmer system; upon being learned, the character uses that ability at no extra cost. Characters have health, and Life Points (LP) which deplete each time they are defeated in battle. If a character runs out of LP, they can no longer participate, but will regenerate LP while in the reserves. LP is also a resource consumed with some abilities, and is fully restored to all party members upon completing a world's quest. There are five different races that have different growth mechanics. Humans have access to most weapon techniques and the ability to learn unique skills. Monsters cannot have armour equipped, but can randomly learn enemy skills upon victory. Mechs have stats and abilities based on their model and attached parts. Vampires have similar growth to humans, but can also learn techniques from party members by sucking their blood. Kugutsu gain new abilities by copying attacks they see in battle. Ephemerals, while able to gain stats, will continuously lose LP over time. When they lose all LP, they die and are reborn, resetting their stats but passing on learned abilities. If the party is defeated in battle, the player has the option to retry the battle, with the party gaining a boost to their power level to make the encounter easier.

== Synopsis ==
Emerald Beyond takes place across multiple worlds connected by an interdimensional space called the Beyond, through which each of the six protagonists travel on their quests guided by an energy dubbed the Emerald Waves. The six protagonists are Tsunanori Mido, a magically gifted man tasked with restoring balance between worlds when his own is threatened; Ameya Aisling, a witch-in-training who has her magic taken away and goes to gain it back while aware of an approaching Calamity; Siugnas, a vampire king seeking to reclaim his realm from a usurper; Diva No.5, a songstress robot who loses her voice and original body after singing a forbidden song, becoming roped into an interdimensional task force; and Bonnie Blair and Formina Franklyn, a pair of rookie police officers investigating an assassination attempt on their world's president.

To complete their missions, each protagonist must journey through the Beyond, following the Emerald Waves to different worlds beset by troubles and with varying levels of awareness of worlds beyond their own. Across each campaign to varying degrees, the protagonists encounter agents of Quisstatium, a group of identical human-like beings who seek to merge the worlds into a single unified whole by force; they include Diva No.5's commander Constantine, and the "Man from the Heavens" who attacked the president of Bonnie and Formina's world. Quisstatium is in some degree responsible for the inciting events in protagonist's story, as they have been given the power to influence events via the Emerald Waves. Each route, including Mido and Aisling's true endings, ends with a fight against the Living Anguish, a being Quisstatium summon as part of their plan to merge the worlds.

== Development ==
Planning for Emerald Beyond began in 2016, after the completion of SaGa: Scarlet Grace. Multiple SaGa veterans returned to work on the game, including series creator Akitoshi Kawazu as director and lead writer, and Masanori Ichikawa as producer. Production was assisted by Opus Studio and Cattle Call. After taking a minimalist design approach with Scarlet Grace, Kawazu wanted to build upon that foundation with more explicit story elements and refinements to the gameplay. These adjustments included greater exploration, and the removal of in-combat healing. After finalizing the game's design, full production began in 2018 after work finished on Scarlet Grace's expanded version Ambitions. Production was slowed both due to other parallel SaGa projects, and the impact of the COVID-19 pandemic.

The team's aim was to take the basic structure of Scarlet Grace, which was well received, and expand and refine it for Emerald Beyond. The combat designer was Tomokazu Shibata, who had worked on Unlimited Saga (2002) and acted as battle director for Kingdom Hearts III (2019). He described the combat system as having been completely redesigned despite carrying over its basic structure from Scarlet Grace, wanting to evolve the combat system rather than replicate it. The team also wanted to incorporate elements from earlier SaGa titles, such as the combination attacks first featured in SaGa Frontier (1997). The "Showstopper" attacks were implemented based on feedback from Scarlet Grace, taking inspiration from times in basketball where an "ace player" changes the outcome of a match. While Kawazu often gave specific instructions on mechanics to include or remove, the battle design was otherwise left to Shibata's team. For the combat adjustment and final debugging during the last stages of development, the team used artificial intelligence to assist them as it would have taken equivalent human workers many times longer due to the game's many scripted battles. The team found the AI useful, though Shibata noted there were difficulties getting the AI to prioritise which game mechanics to check.

Kawazu wanted to create a storyline that would never be the same twice for players. While he wrote the main scenario, other writers were assigned to the substories of different worlds. This was to avoid the chaotic story design problems caused during the production of SaGa Frontier, which featured a similar multiple world and protagonist approach. In contrast to the more hands-off approach with combat design, Kawazu was deeply involved in the storyline and checking over the writing team's work for consistency. Each world's story was created after the gameplay was finalised. The lead characters were decided early on, with some dropped concepts including other vampire characters, a character bound to a motorcycle, and a rival character for Diva No.5. The character Tsunanori was inspired by Kawazu's long-standing wish to write a character with a Kansai accent. Commenting on characters such as Constantine, Kawazu described them as part of the game's "meta structure", having no deeper meaning or overarching implications.

The key visuals and most main characters were designed by Satoshi Kuramochi, who had previously worked on SaGa projects including Scarlet Grace and mobile spin-offs. The characters were designed based on Kawazu's instructions. A notable lead character not designed by Kuramochi was Siugnas, who was instead designed by Sara Takahashi. Additional character designs were handled by Sachi Hiruta and Eri Fujisawa. While Scarlet Grace was limited to human characters due to budget limitations, it was decided early on to feature a more diverse cast. In contrast to earlier SaGa titles, the character designs were created with their 3D models in mind, using digital drawing techniques over analogue. Several in-game locations were based on real-world locations in Japan, the United States and Great Britain.

=== Music ===
Kenji Ito, an established composer for the SaGa series, returned to score the game. The score was arranged by Yohei Kobayashi, and produced by Square Enix's Hidenori Iwasaki. Additional arrangements were done by Ito, Noriyuki Kamikura, Tsutomu Narita, Minako Seki, Hidenori Iwasaki, Chiemi Takano, Ayame, and Koji Yamaoka. Ito was first approached in 2021 to create music demos for the project, recalling that he wanted to take a "completely new approach" to the score while paying homage to earlier SaGa titles. Iwasaki recalled that Ito began creating the score without much information about the game itself. The composition process for the game was described by Ito as "just going by feel".

Ito created the basic score on piano first, then chose a main instrument for each character theme. Ito was given instructions on how to composer several of the character themes. Ameya's music drew inspiration from the themes of earlier witch characters from the series, while Siugnas's themes were designed with his status as a dark king in mind. Diva No. 5's themes were written based on her job rather than being a robot. Tsunanori's themes used jazz elements, Diva No. 5 featured techno, and the theme for Bonnie and Formina was described as having "a detective drama car chase vibe". The score was recorded in a concert hall, something Ito considered a major challenge due to managing a large group of musicians. Early plans to record with an overseas orchestra had to be scrapped.

For vocal pieces, the original lyrics were written by Kawazu. Vocals were performed by Ayano Nonomura, Kyoko Kishikawa, Kocho, Sarah Àlainn and Ceitlin Lilidh. The soundtrack included arrangements of two pre-existing pieces: an arrangement of "Un bel dì, vedremo" from Giacomo Puccini's Madama Butterfly, and a new version of "Auld Lang Syne" for the game's English version. Kawazu that both songs had no deeper meaning to their narrative use, with the only commonality being songs between a man and a woman, but was amused at fan efforts to find deeper meaning after release. One song, "Crazy for Who", was written by Ito with lyrics and vocals by Àlainn. It was not included in-game, instead releasing as an online music video featuring Diva No.5. A soundtrack album was released on May 1, 2024.

== Release ==
A new SaGa title was confirmed in late 2021 during a livestream on the series, with Kawazu stating a hope that it would be revealed the following year. The Emerald Beyond title was trademarked by Square Enix in October 2022. The game was officially announced in September 2023, initially through a Nintendo Direct broadcast and later for wider release: it was announced for Android, iOS, Nintendo Switch, PlayStation 4, PlayStation 5 and Windows. A demo was released on April 4 across Windows and consoles. Different versions of the demo covered the opening of different characters; the PlayStation versions focused on Tsunanori, the Switch version covered Ameya, while the Windows version followed Diva No. 5. Progress from the demo could be transferred into the main game.

Emerald Beyond was released on April 25, 2024. The game was the first simultaneous worldwide release for the SaGa series. Commenting on the localization, its director Neil Broadley said that he wanted the team to "let loose" with modern or silly dialogue as the original script was far less serious and used more colloquial language than was expected from RPGs. A notable element Kawazu highlighted was Diva No.5's English voice having a Scottish accent, which combined with the forbidden nature of "Auld Lang Syne" was intended as part of her home world's backstory. He later voiced disappointment that this connection had not been noticed. The localization was handled by 8-4, who had previously worked on Scarlet Grace. The game's text language was region-locked based on player location, and the international release did not include a Japanese voice track.

== Reception ==
Reception

Aggregate score
Aggregator	Score
Metacritic	NS: 68/100; PC: 67/100; PS5: 76/100

Review scores
Publication	Score
Famitsu	33/40
Nintendo Life	7/10
Nintendo World Report	5/10
RPGFan	81%
TouchArcade	4.5/5
RPG Site	9/10

During its debut week in Japan, Emerald Beyond sold 15,079 units on Switch, and 2,854 units on PS4. Low sales of Emerald Beyond were attributed by Square Enix as contributing to a fall in revenue for the fiscal period in which it released. The game received mixed reviews according to aggregator Metacritic, with the PlayStation 5 version scoring more positively than the PC and Switch releases.

Reviewers for Japanese gaming magazine Famitsu enjoyed the science fiction tone of the narrative. RPG Site's James Galizio positively noted the amount of options presented to players and how much story in some character routes was left unexplained after a single playthrough. Shaun Musgrave of Touch Arcade enjoyed the writing, but felt there was not enough substance for repeated playthroughs. RPGFan's Izzy Parsons felt that the dialogue and story were disjointed due to how the game was structured. Ken Talbot of Nintendo Life enjoyed the multiple characters and worlds, but disliked the writing and found some of the character narratives unevenly paced. Nintendo World Report's Neal Ronaghan had similar opinions to Talbot, and described the localization as inferior to that of Scarlet Grace.

Famitsu described the cutscene and environment design as "very simple" and tailored for combat, Ronaghan positively noted the character variety while faulting the barren world design, and Parsons disliked the minimalist design of the overworlds. Talbot found the world design boring and faulted the lack of a Japanese language track as he disliked some of the English voices. Parsons and Galizio both praised the soundtrack.

Famitsu generally praised the gameplay's design, highlighting the combat system's depth, but one reviewer criticised the lack of tutorials. Musgrave described the combat as enjoyable and challenging, but disliked the game's "safe" structure following that of Scarlet Grace compared to the great variety of earlier entries. Galizio, while disliking the linear exploration style, lauded the additional elements added to the combat system and varied character playstyles. Parsons gave praise to the combat's depth and design while noting a lack of gameplay elements outside it, and faulted the more linear progression compared to other series entries. Talbot lauded the combat design for its refinement of SaGa staples and new mechanics, but like Parsons found little outside combat to enjoy. Ronaghan positively noted the combat loop and stated it salvaged his experience with the game, but found overworld exploration repetitive and boring. The off-putting complexity of the game was a recurring comment among reviewers, with both Musgrave and Galizio finding it difficult to recommend to players outside SaGa fans. By contrast, Ronaghan felt the series' trademark complexity had been stripped down too much.
