= Final Fantasy Legend II =

1990 video game

- North American Game Boy box art
- Developer: Square (Note: Nintendo DS remake developed by Racjin. Nintendo Switch port developed by Square Enix.)
- Publishers: Game Boy; Square; Nintendo DS, Switch; Square Enix
- Director: Akitoshi Kawazu
- Designers: Akitoshi Kawazu; Hiromichi Tanaka; Toshiyuki Inoue
- Programmers: Naoki Okabe; Tomoki Anazawa
- Artist: Katsutoshi Fujioka
- Writer: Akitoshi Kawazu
- Composers: Nobuo Uematsu; Kenji Ito
- Series: SaGa (Note: Rebranded in the West under the Final Fantasy moniker.)
- Platforms: Game Boy, Nintendo DS, Nintendo Switch, Android, iOS, Windows
- Release: December 14, 1990: Game Boy; JP: December 14, 1990; NA: November 1991 Nintendo DS; JP: September 17, 2009 (Remake) Switch; WW: December 19, 2020 Android, iOS; WW: September 22, 2021 Windows; WW: October 21, 2021
- Genre: Role-playing
- Mode: Single-player

Final Fantasy Legend II, known in Japan as SaGa 2: Hihou Densetsu, (Note: Sa・Ga2: Hihō Densetsu (Japanese: サ・ガ2 秘宝伝説; lit. SaGa 2: Legend of the Secret Treasure)) is a role-playing video game developed and published by Square for the Game Boy. The second entry in the SaGa series, it was released in 1990 in Japan, and in 1991 in North America. A remake for the Nintendo DS was released in 2009 by Square Enix, remaining exclusive to Japan. The Game Boy version was later ported to the Nintendo Switch and released worldwide by Square Enix in 2020, with later ports to Android, iOS and Microsoft Windows in 2021.

The game's narrative follows the protagonist as they search for their father, who left them one of the seventy-seven magical MAGI stones, going on to explore the worlds connected by the Pillar of Sky. During gameplay, players explore and fight in turn-based battles, with character attributes randomly increased upon victory. The DS remake uses a system of ability and statistical increases based on battle actions, and incorporates a multiplayer boss arena.

Production began in 1989 after the success of The Final Fantasy Legend. Series creator Akitoshi Kawazu returned as director, and artist Katsutoshi Fujioka returned to design the cover and help with level design. The music was co-composed by Nobuo Uematsu and newcomer Kenji Ito. Final Fantasy Legend II was largely well-received worldwide during its original release, with many calling it better than the first SaGa, and it sold 850,000 units by 2002. Following the game's release, Kawazu led development on Romancing SaGa (1992) for the Super Famicom, while another team based on Osaka developed Final Fantasy Legend III (1991) for the Game Boy.

== Gameplay ==
Battles from the Game Boy original (top) and the Nintendo DS remake (bottom).

Final Fantasy Legend II, known in Japan as SaGa 2: Hihou Densetsu, is a role-playing video game. Set in a science fiction-based world, players take on the role of a four-person party with both humans and monsters able to be recruited. Most of the gameplay is carried over from the first game. The player navigates a party of four character through the game world, exploring areas and interacting with non-player characters (NPCs). Most of the game occurs in towns, castles, caves, and similar areas, all viewed from a top-down perspective.

The party slowly unlocks new worlds to explore, starting with the First World, and are able to save anywhere outside combat. Players can journey between locations via the world map, a downsized representation of the different worlds. Players can freely navigate around the world map screen unless restricted by terrain, such as water or mountains. During exploration, the party can talk with NPCs to gather information about how to progress the narrative, with notes being collected in a journal.

Like The Final Fantasy Legend, travel is occasionally interrupted by random enemy encounters. The game uses a turn-based battle system, where party members take turns using abilities such as attacks, spells, and items. At the end of battles, character statistics (stats) are raised randomly, with different upgrades between character types. Downed units are restored to one health at the end of a battle. If all characters fall in battle, they can be revived by the character Odin in exchange for needing to fight him in the future. The party will find magical stones called MAGI that can be equipped for new abilities and upgrades.

== Synopsis ==
In a search for their missing father, the player-created protagonist seeks out the 77 MAGI stones formed when the statue of the goddess Isis was smashed. Teaming up with three other adventurers, the protagonist collects the MAGI from across a series of worlds connected by the Pillar of Sky. The protagonist's father is revealed to have belonged to a group called the Guardians, who fear bringing together all the MAGI will bring about catastrophe. When the protagonist finds all but one of the MAGI, the god Apollo extorts the gathered MAGI from the party by threatening their allies. As one MAGI is missing, Apollo's attempt to use them goes wrong and all the worlds connected to the Pillar of Sky are struck by earthquakes. Descending the Pillar of Sky, the party restores Isis and with her help defeats the mechanical Arsenals acting as the Pillar of Sky's security system so Isis can restore the worlds unimpeded. The game ends with the protagonist going on a new adventure with their parents.

== Development ==
Production on Final Fantasy Legend II began following the release and success of The Final Fantasy Legend (Makai Toushi SaGa) in 1989, also for the Game Boy. Kawazu had not anticipated a sequel, so the game initially refined the mechanics of the previous title. The staff included planner Hiromichi Tanaka, who Kawazu attributed with pushing forward production and polishing the final game. Kawazu had to wait for Tanaka to finish his work on Final Fantasy III, among other staff members who joined the project. Production was further delayed as developer and publisher Square moved to new headquarters in Akasaka, Tokyo. After these delays, development moved faster than the first game, as all systems beside the world setting were identical. The game was developed by a team of ten staff, including Kawazu and Tanaka. Kawazu acted as director, writer, and a co-designer with Tanaka and Toshiyuki Inoue. The "Teacher" character was based on Minwu, a player character from Final Fantasy II. Odin's role of reviving the player in exchange for a battle was implemented by Kawazu as a surprise for players. The Japanese cover art and character designs were created by Katsutoshi Fujioka, cover artist for the original SaGa. Fujioka also handled level design layout. In a later interview, Kawazu felt the game was truly "complete" compared to the first game.

=== Music ===
The music was co-composed by Nobuo Uematsu and Kenji Ito. While Uematsu had previously worked on the first SaGa, Ito had only just joined the company and this was his first title for Square. At the time, Uematsu was busy working on music for Final Fantasy IV, so Ito was brought in to create half the tracks. Composing for the game was a challenge for Ito as he had no experience with programming, needing to learn on the job. His first completed piece was the track "The Land of Peace"; as he had no experience with the short looping tracks common at the time, the theme was notably long. Kawazu asked for tracks based on particular scenes and moods, keeping the console's memory limitations in mind. Despite precautions, the number of planned parallel sounds was reduced, and several tracks needed to be cut.

A compilation album featuring music from the three Game Boy SaGa titles, All Sounds of SaGa, was published in 1991 by NTT Publishing. The music was released in a soundtrack album in 2018 alongside music from the original SaGa and SaGa 3.

== Release ==
Square published the game in Japan as SaGa 2, on December 14, 1990. The game box and manual were larger than its peers, as the team wanted the product to stand-out. Two guidebooks were published by NTT Publishing in December 1990 and February 1991. During its first print run, the game contained a bug where a button press in a particular situation caused a crash. In North America, the game was released by Square in November 1991. The translation was handled by Kaoru Moriyama. Square rebranded the game under the Final Fantasy moniker in English territories, capitalizing on the recognized brand to grow its regional presence. Sunsoft later licensed the game for a reprint in April 1998 alongside the other three Square titles for the Game Boy.

In 2020, the Game Boy original was re-released alongside the other Game Boy SaGa titles for the Nintendo Switch to celebrate the 30th anniversary of the SaGa series. The collection was published worldwide by Square Enix on December 19 under the title Collection of SaGa: Final Fantasy Legend. (Note: Known in Japan as The Saga Collection (サ・ガ コレクション, Saga Korekushon).) It was a digital exclusive release, and included English and Japanese text options worldwide. Production began at Square Enix so players could enjoy the original SaGa trilogy on modern hardware. While Kawazu had earlier plans to bring the originals onto newer hardware, the series' 30th anniversary provided a good opportunity to fulfil his wish. The port included color and resolution options, higher speed options during gameplay, control options that emulated the Game Boy console, a commemorative track created by Ito, and new artwork by Fujioka. The minor adjustments were done to reflect modern gaming tastes, but otherwise the games were unaltered. While the titles were rebranded as part of the SaGa series, they kept the Final Fantasy branding in their subtitle to avoid confusion for original players. This edition was the first time the Game Boy titles released in Europe. This version was released for Android and iOS on September 22, 2021, and later for Microsoft Windows through Steam on October 21.

=== Nintendo DS remake ===
SaGa 2 Hihō Densetsu: Goddess of Destiny
- Developer: Racjin
- Publisher: Square Enix
- Director: Hiroyuki Miura
- Producer: Hiroyuki Miura
- Artist: Gen Kobayashi
- Composer: Kenji Ito
- Series: SaGa
- Platform: Nintendo DS
- Release: JP: September 17, 2009
- Genre: Role-playing
- Modes: Single-player, multiplayer

A remake for the DS titled SaGa 2 Hihō Densetsu: Goddess of Destiny (Note: (サガ2秘宝伝説 GODDESS OF DESTINY; SaGa 2: Legend of the Secret Treasure: Goddess of Destiny)) was announced in January 2009. Production of the remake began in 2007. Directed by Kawazu, the remake used fully three-dimensional cel-shaded graphics. Kawazu said that he and his team had been planning a remake of the game ever since they remade the first SaGa for the WonderSwan Color in 2002, and went ahead with the project now that they felt "the time was right". Youichi Yoshimoto, who had previously worked on Unlimited Saga, was appointed project supervisor. Gen Kobayashi, character designer for Square Enix's The World Ends with You, provided the game's new promotional and character artwork. Ito returned as composer, both arranging his own and Uematsu's music, and adding new tracks.

Development was handled by Racjin. While Kawazu kept the original story and short playtime, new gameplay features were added. Goddess of Destiny was released on September 17, 2009. The date coincided with the 20th anniversary of the SaGa series, and the remake was made available as part of a limited-edition Nintendo DSi bundle. The SaGa 2 remake remains exclusive to Japan, though a fan translation was developed. Kawazu attributed the lack of localization to uncertainty within Square Enix as to whether the West would accept such an unconventional title.

Goddess of Destiny changed the camera perspective from top-down to an angled 3D view. Battles here are triggered by engaging enemy sprites during exploration similar to later SaGa titles. The remake also changes level-up bonuses from a random system to a defined growth table for each character type. Other new additions are the ability to chain more than one encounter for a boost in experience and items, and the new "Thread of Fate" mechanic which allows for combining two or more party members' attacks. Using the Thread of Fate also grows character affinity, unlocking additional storyline events. A new multiplayer arena allows up to four players to battle the game's bosses to win various rare items.

== Reception ==
Reception

Review scores
| Publication | Score |
|---|---|
| Famitsu | 8/10, 9/10, 9/10, 7/10 (GB); 31/40 (DS) |
| IGN | 8/10 |
| RPGamer | 4/5 (DS); 3/5 (Switch) |
| RPGFan | 90% (GB) |
| Go! | 88/100 (GB) |

Awards
| Publication | Award |
|---|---|
| Nintendo Power | Most Challenging Game Boy Game of 1991 |
| Pocket Games | 8th Best Game Boy Game |

As of 2002, the game had sold 850,000 copies, making it the second best-selling title of the Game Boy SaGa releases. During its first two weeks on sale, the DS remake entered the top ten best-selling games, and sold 124,000 units. By the end of the year, the remake had sold nearly 156,000 units, becoming the 84th best-selling game of 2009 in Japan.

Japanese gaming magazine Famitsu found it easier and more enjoyable than its predecessor, but did not enjoy the removal of its experience point system. Reviewing the 1998 re-release, Dexter Sy of IGN found that the game had aged when compared to more modern role-playing titles, but cited it as the best of the series' Game Boy titles. RPGFan's Patrick Gann, writing in a 2000 review, lauded the title as the best of the Legend games, improving on the first game's systems and offering players greater variety in gameplay and exploration. Two reviewers in Go! complimented the game for humorous graphics and plot while saying it was "vey much like all the other RPGs."

Reviewing the DS remake, Famitsu approved of the redone graphics and gameplay elements, with one reviewer positively noting how easy it was to play. RPGamer's Michael Baker praised the changes to the game's progression system and graphics while remaining faithful to the original game overall. In their own review of the Collection of SaGa compilation, Jordan Rudek of Nintendo World Report praised the second game as better than the original game in terms of its mechanics. Nintendo Life's Mitch Vogel felt that all three titles in Collection of SaGa were very simplistic by modern standards, with none of them having aged well compared to other titles of their time. RPGamer's Elmon Dean Todd, in a standalone review of the game's Switch port, referred to it as one of the Game Boy's best RPGs, though he also felt that the game had aged poorly for modern tastes.

== Legacy ==
During Nintendo Power's annual awards, Final Fantasy Legend II was nominated for "Most Challenging Game Boy Game" of 1991. GameDaily named it alongside the related Game Boy Final Fantasy titles as definitive games for the system. The sentiment was shared by gaming magazines Electronic Gaming Monthly and Pocket Games, the latter of which ranked the titles together 8th out of the Top 50 games for the Game Boy. In March 2006, the title was voted the 94th best game of all time by the readers of Famitsu magazine as part of its "All Time Top 100" poll.

Following the release of Final Fantasy Legend II, Nintendo asked Square to produce a new SaGa game for their in-development Super Famicom. The resultant game, Romancing SaGa, was released in 1992 under Kawazu, with Ito returning as sole composer. Due to continued demand for a new entry on the Game Boy, Square's newly-established Osaka studio produced Final Fantasy Legend III in parallel, releasing it in Japan in 1991 and in North America in 1993. Final Fantasy Legend III was the only SaGa game produced without Kawazu's involvement.
