= The Final Fantasy Legend =

1989 video game

- North American Game Boy box art
- Developer: Square
- Publisher: Game Boy; Square; WonderSwan: JP: Square; Mobile, Switch, Windows; Square Enix
- Director: Akitoshi Kawazu
- Designer: Akitoshi Kawazu
- Programmers: Takashi Oki; Naoki Okabe
- Artists: Ryoko Tanaka; Takashi Tokita
- Writer: Akitoshi Kawazu
- Composer: Nobuo Uematsu
- Series: SaGa (Note: Rebranded in the West under the Final Fantasy moniker.)
- Platforms: Game Boy, WonderSwan Color, i-mode, EZweb, SoftBank Mobile, Nintendo Switch, Android, iOS, Windows
- Release: December 15, 1989: Game Boy; JP: December 15, 1989; NA: September 30, 1990 WonderSwan Color; JP: March 20, 2002 (Remake) i-Mode; JP: July 2, 2007 (Remake) EZweb; JP: December 13, 2007 (Remake) SoftBank 3G; JP: March 12, 2008 (Remake) Switch; WW: December 19, 2020 Android, iOS; WW: September 22, 2021 Windows; WW: October 21, 2021
- Genre: Role-playing
- Mode: Single-player

The Final Fantasy Legend, originally released in Japan as Makai Toushi Sa・Ga, (Note: Japanese: 魔界塔士 サガ; lit. Warrior in the Tower of the Spirit World ~ Sa·Ga) is a 1989 role-playing video game developed and published by Square for the Game Boy. It was originally released in Japan in December 1989 and North America in September 1990. It is the first game in the SaGa series and the first role-playing game for the system. Square translated the game into English for worldwide release and renamed it, linking it with the Final Fantasy series to improve marketing. Sunsoft re-released it in North America during 1998; Square followed with a Japan-exclusive remake released for the WonderSwan Color and mobile phones in 2002 and 2007 respectively, it was also ported to the Nintendo Switch in 2020 and later ported to Android, iOS and Microsoft Windows in 2021.

The Final Fantasy Legend operates on a turn-based system similar to that of Final Fantasy II. The game's characters battle monsters and fiends using a variety of weapons, armor, and skills that develop through the player's actions. The game follows the story of four heroes who attempt to scale a tower at the center of the world that supposedly leads to paradise. The four heroes may belong to one of three character classes, each housing a unique customization path.

The Final Fantasy Legend was conceived by Nobuyuki Hoshino and developed under director Akitoshi Kawazu; renowned composer Nobuo Uematsu wrote its score. The game is Square's first million seller with 1.37 million units shipped. Though released to mixed reception, it has since been described as one of the Game Boy's greatest games and cited as an influence for series such as the Pokémon franchise.

== Gameplay ==
The protagonist in a town, standing in front of an inn and guild hall

In The Final Fantasy Legend, the player navigates a character throughout the game world with a party of up to four characters, exploring areas and interacting with non-player characters. Most of the game occurs in towns, castles, caves, and similar areas. To aid exploration on the field screen, the game makes use of various signs within towns. The player is initially limited to the World of Continent to explore, and given access to later worlds as his or her party climbs the Tower. Players can save their game anytime and anywhere when not in combat to a save slot for later play.

Players can journey between field screen locations via the world map, a downsized representation of Final Fantasy Legend's various worlds. Players can freely navigate around the world map screen unless restricted by terrain, such as water or mountains. The goal in each world is to find the entrance to the next level of the Tower. Random enemy encounters occasionally interrupt travel across the world map screen and hostile areas, as in other Final Fantasy related games.

=== Classes ===
At the beginning of the game, the player must choose a character class, gender, and name for the group's "party leader". There are three available classes: humans, mutants (espers in the Japanese version), and monsters, each with its own strengths and weaknesses. Character classes cannot be changed once the game has begun. The player may recruit up to three additional party members through a similar process via "Member Guilds" in various towns. Characters may also be recruited to replace fallen party members, though the party leader is irreplaceable. Higher-level party members may be recruited at later towns in the game.

A character's performance in battle is determined by numerical values ("statistics") for four categories. Each statistic has a range of 1 to 99. The categories are strength, the effectiveness of physical attacks; defense, the ability to reduce damage received; agility, the effectiveness of ranged weapons or skills and at avoiding attacks; and mana, the effectiveness of magical attacks. A character's health is measured in hit points (HP), consisting of a current HP statistic and a maximum HP statistic, ranging from 0 to 999. Character statistics are relative to their class—humans have higher HP levels, strength, and defense, and mutants are physically weaker but enjoy a higher mana statistic. Human and mutant statistics can be amplified by worn equipment of different types. Monster-class characters are dependent on their sub-class, and their statistics vary greatly.

Humans raise their statistics through items that grant permanent bonuses, such as "STRENGTH" or "HP200". Mutant attributes simply increase by random increments after battles, and new abilities may be gained (or lost) in the process. Monsters change in power by consuming "meat" dropped in battles; depending on the monster's current sub-class and the meat's origin, the monster may transform into a stronger or weaker sub-class or fully recover health. Later versions of the game released upon the WonderSwan and mobile phones removed the latter effect entirely.

=== Equipment and abilities ===
The basic function of equipment in SaGa games is to increase character attributes. Arming a character with a gold helmet increases his or her base defense statistic, for example. The amount of equipment that can be placed on any one character at any time depends on the character's class. Humans can hold eight, mutants four, and monsters none. There are five types of armor: shields, helmets, breastplates, gauntlets, and shoes. Only one of each at a time may be added to one character and cannot be added to monsters. Weapons, consisting of swords, hammers, whips, spell books, and guns, utilize either the strength, agility or mana attribute of a character, and can be used only a certain number of times before breaking and being removed from the player's inventory. Shields can be used as items in combat, most with a limited number of uses, and allow the user to evade enemy attacks.

Mutants and monsters have different spells and abilities depending on their battle experience and sub-class. These come in one of four categories: attack, non-combative, healing, and resistances/weaknesses. When used in combat, attack spells and abilities will damage a target by an elemental type, while non-combative spells and abilities inflict various status ailments (such as "blindness") or grant benefits upon a target. Healing spells and abilities restore a target's HP and can be used outside of combat. Certain spells and abilities have added traits, like affecting a group of enemies or draining HP from a target. Each spell and ability has a finite number of uses, and once depleted the party must visit an inn to recharge them. Resistances and weaknesses are abilities that are active throughout combat. Represented by an "O" or "X" next to the related element or status ailment, they respectively give the user either resistance or weakness to one or more types of attack; status ailments grant immunity against a particular ailment.

Curative items can be found or purchased in the game through various means, each with a limited number of uses and able to be activated from a character's inventory or the items sub-menu to restore HP or remove a status ailment in or out of combat from a single target. Like other inventory items, in order to be used during combat these must be placed in a party member's equipment slot prior to battle.

=== Combat ===
Combat is initiated when the player encounters an enemy, which changes the map to the "battle screen". The enemy appears at the top, above the current party characters; each battle uses a menu-driven turn-based system. At the beginning of each turn, the player selects whether to fight or attempt to run. If the fight option is selected, the player selects an action for each party member from his or her equipment or skills to attack, defend, use magic, or use equipped items. Once the player has chosen actions for each player character, the player characters and enemy begin battle. Participants move one at a time determined by their agility statistic. If the player tries the "attempt to run" option and it fails, the party skip their turn and the enemy attacks. Combat ends if the party successfully flees, all enemies are defeated, or all player characters are defeated; in the last case, the game ends and must be reloaded from the last save.

Winning battles may award the player money (GP) and items. Enemy monsters occasionally drop meat, which can be consumed by monster-class characters. Mutant classes may "evolve" at this point, randomly gaining either increased statistics or a new random magic spell or ability, possibly overwriting an existing one. Party members that lose HP during combat can have them restored via curative items, spells, inns, or elements of the world such as healing fountains. If a party member other than the starting character is defeated in battle, he or she loses a "heart" and must be resurrected in a town via the building with a large heart-shaped symbol on it. Defeated characters with no remaining hearts cannot be revived. An item can be bought at significant expense to restore a heart to a character. Alternatively, a fallen party member can also be replaced completely with a new character recruited from a town guild, regardless of the number of hearts they have remaining.

== Story ==
=== Setting ===
The Final Fantasy Legend takes place on several worlds centered around a large tower, built by the Creator in ancient times (God in the Japanese version) to link worlds. There are four unique major worlds that make up different layers of the tower: the World of Continent at the base, the World of Ocean on the 5th floor, the World of Sky on the 10th, and the World of Ruins on the 16th. Time does not flow at a constant pace between levels of the tower, rendering some worlds more technologically advanced than others. Various monsters come forth from the tower into each world; many are hostile, but some of them are friendly to humans and willing to coexist. An offshoot of the human race (named mutants, espers in the Japanese version) also exists in each world; they are the magic-attuned descendants of a union between humans and the World of Continent's older races.

The World of Continent is a large land mass ruled by three kings in constant war for control of their world. They each carry an object needed to open the tower's entrance. The World of Ocean consists of various small islands surrounded by water, each connected by small caves. Pirates roam the sea of this world, forbidding travel by ship. The World of Sky contains large land masses suspended in clouds, and is ruled by a powerful dictator from his flying castle. The World of Ruins is a technologically advanced cityscape, reduced to a post-apocalyptic wasteland by constant monster attacks.

=== Plot ===
Standing in front of the tower, the hero and party learn that they cannot climb it to paradise without first unsealing its base door. In the base world, three kings named Armor, Sword, and Shield fight for dominance using pieces of legendary equipment corresponding to their names. Visiting King Armor, the party learns that he is in love with a girl who returns his feelings, but cannot marry him, as a bandit holds her village hostage in return for her love. They defeat the bandit, and the king gives them his armor in gratitude. King Sword attacks the heroes, who vanquish him and take the sword. Lastly, King Shield is murdered by his own steward, and after a fight, the party recovers his shield. Restoring the items to a statue of a great hero, they receive the Black Sphere, but are attacked by Gen-bu, one of four fiends controlled by Ashura. They defeat him and use the power of the Sphere to enter the tower.

They climb the tower and come to another door; inside lies a world surrounded by large bodies of water. By navigating caves, they find a floating island which allows them to travel around the world by air. They locate an old man, Ryu-O, and solve his riddle to obtain the Airseed, allowing them to breathe underwater and enter the undersea palace. They defeat the second fiend, Sei-ryu, and recover half of the second sphere. Upon returning to Ryu-O, he reveals himself to be the guardian of the other half of the sphere, and the two halves form the Blue Sphere.

Using the Blue Sphere to continue up the tower, the party comes to a world of clouds, dominated by Byak-ko and an army of thugs. They learn that Byak-ko recently wiped out an underground resistance movement, except for Millie and Jeanne, the two daughters of its leader. The party temporarily joins Byak-ko's gang to find the girls, and attempt to defend them, but Millie betrays Jeanne and the party is captured. Breaking free, they confront the fiend, who tries to kill Millie; Jeanne takes the blow and dies in her stead. The party defeats the fiend, recovers the White Sphere, and continues their journey.

The fourth world is a post-apocalyptic wasteland; Su-Zaku roams the surface defended by an impenetrable forcefield. The party retreats to an abandoned subway for refuge and meets Sayaka, who directs them to the nearest town. There the party is confronted by the leader of a biker gang, So-Cho, but his sister Sayaka intervenes and the two groups agree to work together to defeat Su-Zaku. As they gather the needed parts for a device to deactivate the forcefield, So-Cho sacrifices his life to guide the party through an atomic power plant. Beasts then ambush the town, and Su-Zaku kidnaps Sayaka. The party defeats Su-Zaku, earns the Red Sphere and travels on.

Climbing the tower, the party discovers the remains of a family that attempted to reach Paradise but failed, and a library suggesting Ashura is controlled by someone else. They encounter him at the top, guarding the final door; he offers each of them control of one of the worlds, but they refuse and defeat him. Before they can pass through the door, a trap drops them to the bottom floor. Encountering the allies they made along their journey, they decide to rescale the tower. As they climb stairs that wrap outside of the tower, they engage each of the fiends revived and defeat them. They find the Creator at the summit, and learn that the fiends and the tower itself are actually part of a game created by him to see heroes defeat evil; for succeeding they would be granted a wish as a reward. Angry at his manipulation, they reject the reward and challenge the Creator, who insists that because he created everything he was allowed to use them as he saw fit. They then attack and defeat the Creator. The heroes then discover a door leading to an unknown location; they consider entering, but decide to return to their own world.

== Development ==
The Final Fantasy Legend was the first installment of the SaGa series in Japan and the first Game Boy game produced by Square. Square president Masafumi Miyamoto requested developers create a Game Boy game after he noticed the success of Tetris and the popularity of the handheld system. Akitoshi Kawazu and Koichi Ishii decided that instead of creating a game similar to Tetris, they would produce what they felt customers desired most: a role-playing game. At that time, Kawazu was creating concepts for a potential Final Fantasy III, but due to the switch from home console to a portable device, the mechanics needed to be adjusted for the less powerful hardware. Square's concept for the game was a title that could be completed in six to eight hours, based on the duration of an airplane flight between Narita, Japan and Honolulu, Hawaii. Describing his design goal for the game in later interviews, Kawazu stated he wanted to distance it from the Final Fantasy series in tone and design. The "SaGa" title was chosen to stand out from other game series with long titles, with Kawazu remembering "Doga" and "Zuba" as other proposed names. Kawazu chose the subtitle Makai Toushi both based on a discarded early scenario, and as a joking reference to an unauthorised Asian version of Phantasie (1985), wanting something that "evoke an Asian feel".

Developers sought to optimize the game for short bursts of gameplay, as if played by a train passenger between stations. The combat system carried over similar usage-based statistic growth to Final Fantasy II (1988), with Kawazu using feedback to fine tune it while having the same design philosophy of experimentation. To avoid characters becoming too similar to each other, he introduced the different races with distinct mechanics. The random encounter frequency was raised relative to its other role playing games, ensuring players would have at least one enemy encounter during short playtime to maintain an interesting experience. The Final Fantasy Legend was designed to be difficult and feature advanced gameplay, described by Kawazu as the main difference between SaGa and Final Fantasy. Square implemented several other ideas to distance the games, notably the "meat" system to allow players to collect enemy abilities, though these proved difficult to portray at first.

Kawazu took a direct hand in shaping the game's scenario development, working alongside Ishii, Takashi Tokita, and Hiroyuki Ito, who were involved in other Square projects at the time. Ishii and Ito developed the game's world layout and geography as well; Ryōko Tanaka designed the background graphics. Tokita developed character concept art and handled the in-game sprites. Due to the monochrome limitations of the Game Boy, the art design needed to be tailored so nothing required color to be expressive. The Japanese cover artwork was designed by Katsutoshi Fujioka. The monochrome screen of the Game Boy proved an obstacle, as some graphics such as fire were more difficult to portray without color. As a result, they had to develop a world that "works in black and white". Tanaka later revealed that the 2-megabit capacity of contemporary Game Boy cartridges severely limited their designs; the team removed some elements from the finished game to ensure peak performance.

=== Audio ===
The Final Fantasy Legend's soundtrack was composed by Nobuo Uematsu and consists of sixteen tracks. Uematsu struggled with composition at first, as the Game Boy's sound hardware was different from the Famicom's, featuring a new stereo option, unique waveforms, and only three musical notes. Kawazu wanted the game's music to resemble that of Square's two preceding Final Fantasy titles, but Uematsu chose to develop new waveforms. The music was severely limited by the Game Boy's technical specifications, having only three note types available.

Square has reused several songs from the game (notably the "Battle" theme) in later titles and released them on compilation soundtracks. The introductory music, titled "Prologue", appeared remixed as the opening for the next two SaGa games. "Heartful Tears" (also known as "Wipe Your Tears Away") became a staple for later SaGa titles, used in five of the games and arranged differently each time. Fifteen tracks were later included in the 1991 two-disc All Sounds of SaGa soundtrack, encompassing the Game Boy SaGa series and re-released by Square Enix in December 2004 as SaGa Zenkyoku Shu. The final track of the set, "Journey's End", is a synthesizer-arranged version of six of the game's tracks combined into one by Uematsu. In the liner notes for All Sounds of SaGa, Uematsu states he enjoys listening to the track while remembering scenes from the game. The Kanagawa Philharmonic Orchestra played the song in the Press Start 2008 -Symphony of Games- concert as part of the "When Nobuo Uematsu Was Young" medley, while the "Main Theme" was played alongside "Save the World" from Final Fantasy Legend II on July 9, 2011, at the Symphonic Odysseys concert.

=== Merchandise ===
Several items of merchandise have been released for the game, including books and telephone cards. Futabasha Publishers Ltd. released a book in February 1990 titled Makai Toushi Sa·Ga—Boukenshatachi no Rekuiemu (冒険者たちのレクイエム^{?}, Requiem of the Adventurers). Written by Misa Ikeda, the 287-page book was part of Futabasha's Game Boy Adventure series for children, and detailed a hero's trek to the top of the tower to reach Paradise. In August, Square featured the game in Final Fantasy Ryūkishi Dan - Knights (=ファイナルファンタジー竜騎士団^{?}, Final Fantasy Dragon Knights), a fan book which consisting of reactions and artworks to the series. The game was one of four titles featured in October 1992 by Game Players magazine on a video tape named Game Player's Gametape for Game Boy Games, which demonstrated the game and offered a gameplay tutorial.

== Versions and re-releases ==
The WonderSwan version features different graphics and new prompts for aiding in party maintenance.

Square released the game December 1989 in Japan as Makai Toushi Sa·Ga and included a map for the four major worlds in the game; a revised version followed shortly after. Square translated it to English in March 1990, and planned to release it in North America with new artwork as The Great Warrior Saga. Its final Western title was The Final Fantasy Legend. At different times Kawazu has attributed the change to Square and its Western publisher Nintendo, with the intent being to capitalise on the success of the original Final Fantasy.

Developers made slight modifications for this version, such as removing the game's credits and adjusting the longevity of certain weapons. Changes to the text were also made, including the omission of some of Ryu-O's riddles, removal of mention about self-sacrifice and a hint of the Tower's true purpose. Notably, the exchange between the player's party and the Creator, where the latter reveals that he created Asura simply out of boredom, is altered. In 1998, Sunsoft acquired the license to the Game Boy "Final Fantasy" games, re-releasing them in North America the same year. Despite advertising compatibility with Nintendo's Game Boy Color handheld, the re-released version featured no enhancements.

Square re-released of The Final Fantasy Legend for Bandai's WonderSwan Color unit; the Japan-exclusive port debuted in March 2002 under the Japanese title. Toshiyuki Itahana redrew the character designs, and Square added animated cutscenes. Developers also enabled players to see in advance what a monster would transform into before eating meat left behind after battle. The port allowed playthrough of the intact original Game Boy version. Among other changes and additions were gameplay tweaks, a bestiary, and an added feature that allowed players to automatically target an enemy for attack in combat.

As of January 2007, Square Enix had renewed their trademark on the Japanese name for the game, and at Square Enix's 2007 Tokyo Game Show in September made a mobile phone port of the WonderSwan version available for play. Square released the game for download in 2007 and 2008 for Japanese i-mode, EZweb and SoftBank Mobile compatible phones. The port removed the bestiary mode and the original Game Boy version of the game, and condensed some of the in-game cutscenes. It added Japanese kanji support and extra shops with new equipment throughout the quest.

In 2020, the original version was re-released alongside the other two Game Boy SaGa titles for the Nintendo Switch. The collection was published worldwide by Square Enix on December 19 under the title Collection of SaGa: Final Fantasy Legend. (Note: Known in Japan as The Saga Collection (サ・ガ コレクション, Saga Korekushon).) It was a digital exclusive release, and included English and Japanese text options worldwide. Production began at Square Enix so players could enjoy the original SaGa trilogy on modern hardware. While Kawazu had earlier plans to bring the originals onto newer hardware, the series' 30th anniversary provided a good opportunity to fulfil his wish.

The port included color and resolution options, higher speed options during gameplay, control options that emulated the Game Boy console, a commemorative track created by later composer Kenji Ito, and new artwork by Fujioka. The minor adjustments were done to reflect modern gaming tastes, but otherwise the games were unaltered. The WonderSwan port of the first SaGa was considered for release, but it was decided to leave it out to focus on the originals. While the titles were rebranded as part of the SaGa series, their original Final Fantasy branding was retained as a subtitle to avoid undue confusion for original players. This edition was the first time the Game Boy titles officially released in Europe.

== Reception and legacy ==
Reception

Aggregate score
Aggregator	Score
GameRankings	49% (retrospective)

Review scores
Publication	Score
AllGame	3.5/5
Famitsu	9/10, 9/10, 9/10, 8/10
Génération 4	10/10
IGN	6/10
Chicago Tribune	15/20
Power Play	78%

Awards
Publication	Award
Nintendo Power	3rd Best Game Boy Game of 1990, 70th Best Nintendo Game
Pocket Games	8th Best Game Boy Game

The Final Fantasy Legend is Square's first game to sell over a million copies; the Game Boy version alone shipped 1.37 million copies worldwide (1.15 million in Japan) as of March 2003. Square quickly released two sequels for the Game Boy, and marketed subsequent SaGa games on other video game consoles. The one-eyed monster featured on the Japanese box art later became the series' mascot, appearing in the sequel as a character named "Mr. S". Game Freak founder Satoshi Tajiri cited the game's influence behind the Game Boy Pokémon series, stating it gave him the idea that the system could handle more than action games.

Upon release, Makai Toushi Sa·Ga was acclaimed by Japanese critics. In Famitsu, two reviewers complimented that the game really suited the Game Boy, while two wished it was expanded upon and released for the Famicom. It was one of their two highest-rated games of 1989, along with Ys I & II. It entered the Famitsu Platinum Hall of Fame, being one only seven games up until 1989 to have received a score of at least 35 or above from Famitsu.

Western critics gave mostly positive reviews upon its initial release. Author Jeff Rovin heavily praised the title in the book How to Win at Game Boy Games, citing the thorough manual and considering the game a "masterful achievement for the Game Boy unit, and a superlative game of [its] kind", though not as complex as The Legend of Zelda. In May 1991, Nintendo Power named the game the third all-around best Game Boy game of the previous year, and in September 1997 they ranked it 70th on their list of the "Top 100" games to appear on a Nintendo system, stating that it had "stayed true to the Square Soft tradition". The Chicago Tribune in 1991 called the game "a little slow in spots, but, like Final Fantasy, worth your patience", and a "good quest". The newspaper gave the game ratings of 8 out of 10 and 7 out of 10. German gaming magazine Power Play wrote that they had been waiting for a portable role-playing game and found it unbelievable that the programmers managed to get so much in a game style that was normally only found on large home computers. He found that the combat system did not have the depth of an Advanced Dungeons & Dragons game, but hardly found that to be a serious problem.

The Game Boy version of the game received mixed reviews in retrospective. IGN called The Final Fantasy Legend a "compelling RPG with a complex gameplay system and a solid soundtrack", but complained about the game's difficulty and "dated" graphics. Allgame praised the title on its merits as a role-playing game, but criticized its high difficulty and lack of a sense of direction. 1UP's Retronauts described its gameplay as a successor to Final Fantasy II's, though added that the systems involved were not properly refined until its sequel; they further stated that the randomness of the mutant and monster character classes made the game very difficult. Spencer Yip of Siliconera named it as a game he was thankful for playing, citing it as opening his mind to story-based games more so than titles like Dragon Quest, and in part led to the creation of the website.

TechnoBuffalo's Ron Duwell said that, while it was regarded less favorably than its sequels, its flaws could be worked around and added that there was no such other title to compete like The Final Fantasy Legend. 1UP.com's Jeremy Parish called it one of the "essential" games for the Game Boy as well as one of the best of 1989, noting its introduction of new ideas that contrasted the Final Fantasy series and calling it "a pretty decent portable RPG in its own right". GameDaily named it a definite game for Game Boy alongside the related Final Fantasy titles, describing it as providing "hours of role-playing excitement". Andrew Vanden Bossche described the game as "unusual" amongst Japanese roleplaying games, describing its narrative as "loosely connected experiences rather than the sort of epic narrative the RPG genre is commonly thought of". As a result, the off-screen deaths of non-player characters felt more "poignant" and an example of memento mori. However, he also felt the monster class system as counter-intuitive, as frequently said classes emphasized the point of enemies as "designed to pose challenges, not overcome them". Electronic Gaming Monthly, Pocket Games, and GameSpot shared this sentiment; the latter three named it one of the top fifty games for the Game Boy. Along with Final Fantasy Adventure and the other two Final Fantasy Legend games, Game Informer placed as the sixth in their list of the "Top 25 Game Boy Games of All-Time" in 1997.

The difficulty and significance of the game's final boss, the Creator, has elicited several mentions. GamePro named him one of the "47 Most Diabolical Video-Game Villains of All Time", placing him 37th on the list and adding "You gotta wonder... how many hit points did the developers give God?" 1UP.com described the battle as "epic", considering it part of a recurring theme of Japanese role-playing games in which characters band together to kill God. Comedian Jackie Kashian referenced the Creator on Comedy Central Presents, describing the game's final battle as "the worst premise ever of any video game", and recalling how she still tried for eight months to defeat the boss. Despite the final boss' difficulty, it can be killed easily by the instant-death "chainsaw" weapon. In 2009, Square Enix battle planner Nobuyuki Matsuoka paid homage to the fact in the game Final Fantasy XIII, by deliberately giving the title's final boss a similar vulnerability. Square brought back the character as a boss in later SaGa games Imperial SaGa Eclipse and Romancing SaGa Re;univerSe, the former of which included a line referencing his weakness to the chainsaw.
