= Au (mobile phone company) =

Japanese telecommunication brand

au

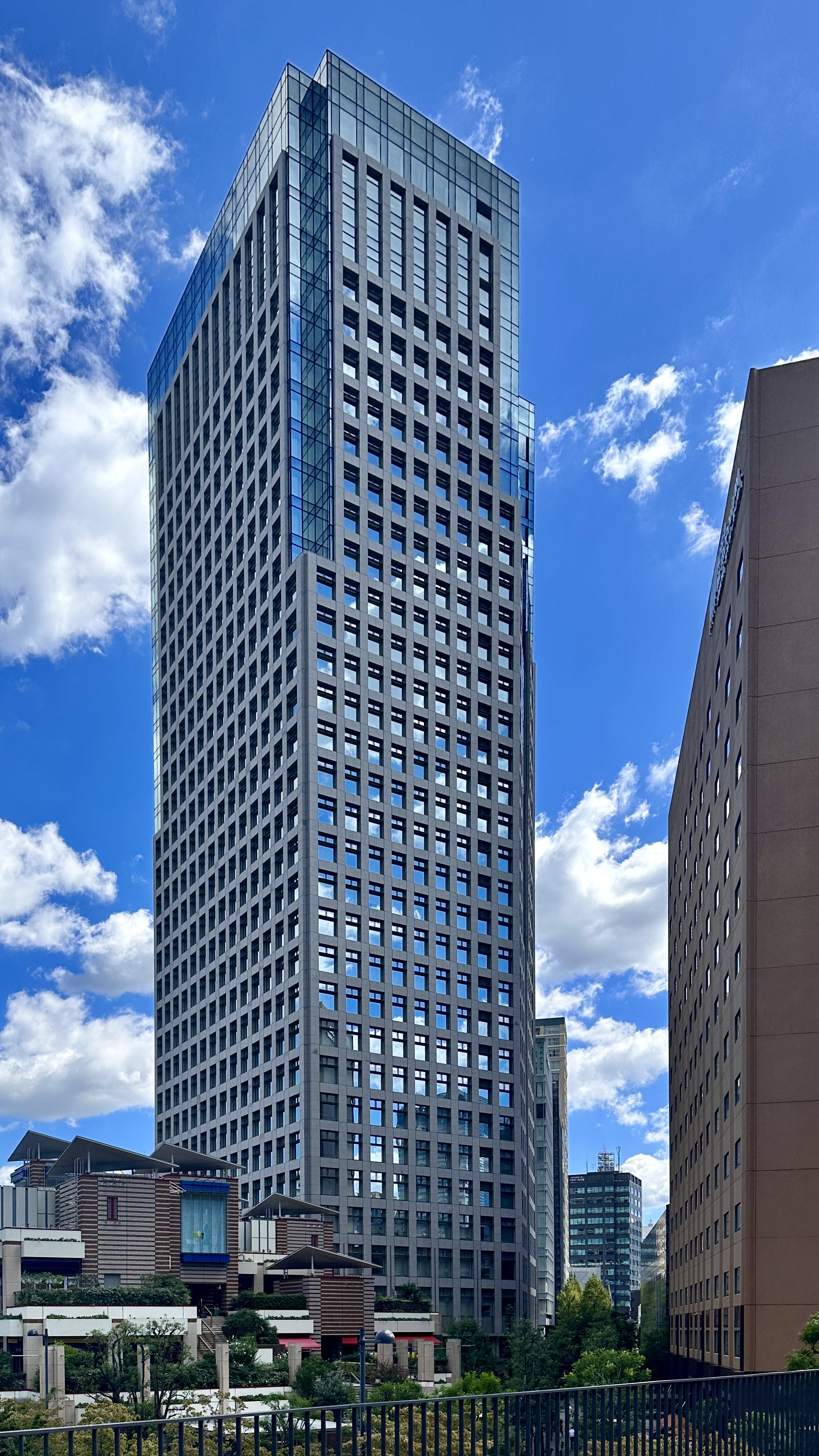
- Industry: Telecommunications
- Founded: 1 November 2000; 25 years ago
- Headquarters: Japan
- Products: Chaku-Uta-Full, LISMO
- Parent: KDDI
- Website: au.com

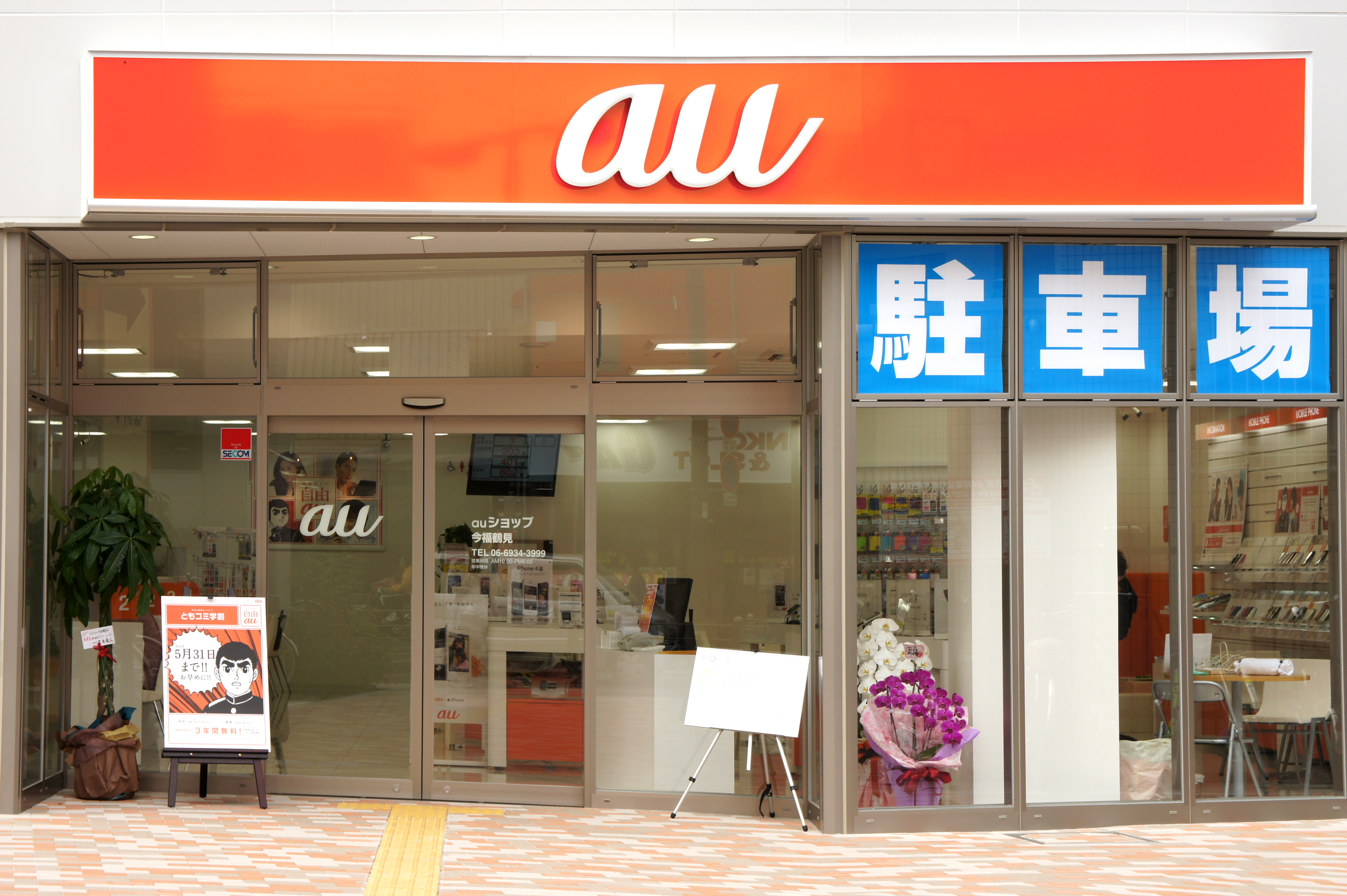
An au store in Osaka

au, or au by KDDI, is a Japanese mobile phone operator. au is a brand marketed by KDDI in the main islands of Japan and by Okinawa Cellular in Okinawa for their mobile cellular services. au is the second-largest wireless carrier in Japan, with 60.398 million subscribers as of March 2021.

== Naming ==
According to the brand creator, the name 'au' is based on the Japanese verbs for 'meet' (会う) and 'unite' (合う) (both pronounced 'au'). However, KDDI explains that au comes from two letters which stand for few words. 'A' is for access, always and amenity, and 'U' is for unique, universal and user. There is also a phrase, 'access to u(you)' that goes along the brand name.

== History ==
The network that would eventually become au was originally set up as two networks: DDI and IDO. IDO's network was based upon the NTT Hi-cap analog cellular system, and began operations in December 1988 in the Kanto and Tokai regions. DDI's network was run by independent phone companies, and began service in 1989 using the TACS system elsewhere in Japan. Nippon Idou Tsushin (IDO) was owned by Toyota, whereas DDI was owned by Kyocera Corporation.

au K.K. (株式会社エーユー) was established in November 2000 by Kyocera as part of the DDI Cellular network. In 2001, the company was merged into KDDI (which had been formed in 2000 by the merger of DDI, KDD, and IDO), but its brand name was retained and applied to all mobile phone service under KDDI group.

au established a nationwide 3G network in 2003, replacing its previous cdmaOne service with CDMA 1X WIN (1xEV-DO Rev A) service. It started selling the iPhone 4S from 14 October 2011. The company launched LTE service as 'au 4G LTE' in September 2012. It launched 5G service as 'UNLIMITED WORLD au 5G' on 26 March 2020.

== Marketing ==
au sponsored the Cerumo team in Japan Grand Touring Championship between 2001 and 2004, and has gone on to become the title sponsor of the #36 TOM'S entry in its successor Super GT from 2016 to present.
