= List of United Kingdom locations: Croe-Cros =

The United Kingdom

This is part of the list of United Kingdom locations: a gazetteer of place names in the United Kingdom showing each place's locality and geographical coordinates.

== Cro (continued) ==
=== Croe-Crom ===
Location	Locality	Coordinates (links to map & photo sources)	OS grid reference
Croesau Bach	Shropshire	52.84°N 03.12°W	SJ2428
Croeserw	Bridgend	51.64°N 03.64°W	SS8695
Croes-goch	Pembrokeshire	51.92°N 05.17°W	SM8230
Croes-Hywel	Monmouthshire	51.82°N 02.97°W	SO3314
Croes-lan	Ceredigion	52.07°N 04.36°W	SN3844
Croes Llanfair	Monmouthshire	51.75°N 02.97°W	SO3307
Croesor	Gwynedd	52.97°N 04.04°W	SH6344
Croespenmaen	Caerphilly	51.67°N 03.17°W	ST1998
Croeswallt	Shropshire	52.85°N 03.05°W	SJ2929
Croes-wian	Flintshire	53.24°N 03.32°W	SJ1273
Croesyceiliog	Torfaen	51.65°N 03.01°W	ST3096
Croesyceiliog	Carmarthenshire	51.81°N 04.32°W	SN4016
Croes-y-mwyalch	Torfaen	51.62°N 03.01°W	ST3092
Croes y pant	Monmouthshire	51.73°N 03.00°W	SO3104
Croesywaun	Gwynedd	53.10°N 04.21°W	SH5259
Croft	Cheshire	53.43°N 02.55°W	SJ6393
Croft	Herefordshire	52.28°N 02.80°W	SO4565
Croft	Leicestershire	52.55°N 01.24°W	SP5195
Croft	Lincolnshire	53.12°N 00.24°E	TF5061
Croftamie	Stirling	56.04°N 04.45°W	NS4786
Croftfoot	City of Glasgow	55.81°N 04.23°W	NS6060
Crofthandy	Cornwall	50.23°N 05.18°W	SW7342
Croftlands	Cumbria	54.17°N 03.10°W	SD2876
Croftmalloch	West Lothian	55.85°N 03.69°W	NS9464
Croft Mitchell	Cornwall	50.18°N 05.27°W	SW6637
Croftnacriech	Highland	57.51°N 04.28°W	NH6349
Crofton	Bromley	51.37°N 00.06°E	TQ4466
Crofton	Cumbria	54.84°N 03.09°W	NY3050
Crofton	West Yorkshire	53.64°N 01.42°W	SE3817
Crofton	Wiltshire	51.35°N 01.62°W	SU2662
Crofton Park	Lewisham	51.45°N 00.03°W	TQ367744
Croft-on-Tees	North Yorkshire	54.47°N 01.56°W	NZ2809
Croft Outerly	Fife	56.19°N 03.22°W	NO2401
Crofts Bank	Trafford	53.45°N 02.37°W	SJ7595
Crofts of Dipple	Moray	57.61°N 03.14°W	NJ3259
Crofts of Haddo	Aberdeenshire	57.42°N 02.28°W	NJ8337
Crofts of Kingscauseway	Highland	57.78°N 04.07°W	NH7779
Crofty	Swansea	51.63°N 04.14°W	SS5295
Croggan	Argyll and Bute	56.37°N 05.72°W	NM7027
Croglin	Cumbria	54.81°N 02.67°W	NY5747
Croich or Croick (Ross and Cromarty)	Highland	57.88°N 04.61°W	NH4591
Croick (Sutherland)	Highland	58.46°N 03.90°W	NC8954
Croir	Western Isles	58.24°N 06.85°W	NB1539
Cromarty	Highland	57.67°N 04.04°W	NH7867
Crombie	Fife	56.04°N 03.54°W	NT0485
Cromdale	Highland	57.33°N 03.54°W	NJ0728
Cromer	Hertfordshire	51.93°N 00.12°W	TL2928
Cromer	Norfolk	52.93°N 01.28°E	TG2142
Cromer Hyde	Hertfordshire	51.79°N 00.26°W	TL2012
Cromford	Derbyshire	53.10°N 01.56°W	SK2956
Cromhall	South Gloucestershire	51.60°N 02.44°W	ST6990
Cromhall Common	South Gloucestershire	51.59°N 02.44°W	ST6989
Cromor	Western Isles	58.10°N 06.41°W	NB4021
Crompton Fold	Oldham	53.57°N 02.09°W	SD9409
Cromwell	Nottinghamshire	53.14°N 00.82°W	SK7961
Cromwell Bottom	Calderdale	53.69°N 01.81°W	SE1222

=== Cron-Crop ===
Location	Locality	Coordinates (links to map & photo sources)	OS grid reference
Cronberry	East Ayrshire	55.47°N 04.21°W	NS6022
Crondall	Hampshire	51.22°N 00.86°W	SU7948
Cronton	Knowsley	53.38°N 02.76°W	SJ4988
Crook	Devon	50.81°N 03.19°W	ST1602
Crook	Durham	54.71°N 01.75°W	NZ1635
Crook	Cumbria	54.34°N 02.83°W	SD4695
Crookdake	Cumbria	54.77°N 03.26°W	NY1943
Crooke	Wigan	53.55°N 02.68°W	SD5507
Crooked Billet	Merton	51.41°N 00.23°W	TQ2370
Crookedholm	East Ayrshire	55.60°N 04.46°W	NS4537
Crooked Soley	Wiltshire	51.44°N 01.55°W	SU3172
Crooked Withies	Dorset	50.84°N 01.93°W	SU0505
Crookes	Sheffield	53.37°N 01.52°W	SK3287
Crookesmoor	Sheffield	53.37°N 01.50°W	SK3387
Crookfur	East Renfrewshire	55.77°N 04.34°W	NS5356
Crookgate Bank	Durham	54.89°N 01.72°W	NZ1856
Crookhall	Durham	54.84°N 01.83°W	NZ1150
Crookham	Berkshire	51.37°N 01.22°W	SU5464
Crookham	Northumberland	55.63°N 02.14°W	NT9138
Crookham Village	Hampshire	51.26°N 00.86°W	SU7952
Crookhill	Gateshead	54.96°N 01.76°W	NZ1563
Crooklands	Cumbria	54.24°N 02.72°W	SD5383
Crook Log	Bexley	51.459°N 00.128°E	TQ478755
Crook of Devon	Perth and Kinross	56.18°N 03.56°W	NO0300
Crookston	City of Glasgow	55.83°N 04.36°W	NS5263
Croome	East Riding of Yorkshire	54.08°N 00.57°W	SE9365
Cropredy	Oxfordshire	52.11°N 01.32°W	SP4646
Cropston	Leicestershire	52.69°N 01.18°W	SK5511
Cropthorne	Worcestershire	52.09°N 02.01°W	SO9944
Cropton	North Yorkshire	54.29°N 00.84°W	SE7589
Cropwell Bishop	Nottinghamshire	52.90°N 00.99°W	SK6835
Cropwell Butler	Nottinghamshire	52.92°N 00.98°W	SK6837

=== Cros ===
Location	Locality	Coordinates (links to map & photo sources)	OS grid reference
Cros	Western Isles	58.46°N 06.28°W	NB5061
Crosbost	Western Isles	58.12°N 06.43°W	NB3924
Crosby	Cumbria	54.72°N 03.44°W	NY0738
Crosby	Isle of Man	54.17°N 04.57°W	SC3279
Crosby	North Lincolnshire	53.58°N 00.68°W	SE8711
Crosby	Sefton	53.47°N 03.04°W	SJ3198
Crosby Court	North Yorkshire	54.31°N 01.40°W	SE3991
Crosby Garrett	Cumbria	54.47°N 02.43°W	NY7209
Crosby-on-Eden	Cumbria	54.92°N 02.84°W	NY4659
Crosby Ravensworth	Cumbria	54.52°N 02.58°W	NY6214
Crosby Villa	Cumbria	54.72°N 03.41°W	NY0938
Croscombe	Somerset	51.19°N 02.58°W	ST5944
Crosemere	Shropshire	52.85°N 02.84°W	SJ4329
Crosland Edge	Kirklees	53.59°N 01.85°W	SE1011
Crosland Hill	Kirklees	53.62°N 01.83°W	SE1114
Crosland Moor	Kirklees	53.63°N 01.83°W	SE1115
Croslands Park	Cumbria	54.12°N 03.21°W	SD2171
Cross (Croyde)	Devon	51.12°N 04.21°W	SS4539
Cross (Goodleigh)	Devon	51.08°N 04.00°W	SS6034
Cross	Somerset	51.28°N 02.84°W	ST4154
Cross	Shropshire	52.91°N 02.90°W	SJ3936
Crossapol	Argyll and Bute	56.48°N 06.89°W	NL9943
Cross Ash	Monmouthshire	51.86°N 02.87°W	SO4019
Cross-at-Hand	Kent	51.18°N 00.54°E	TQ7846
Cross Bank	Worcestershire	52.35°N 02.38°W	SO7473
Crossbrae	Aberdeenshire	57.55°N 02.51°W	NJ6952
Crossburn	Falkirk	55.92°N 03.82°W	NS8672
Crossbush	West Sussex	50.84°N 00.53°W	TQ0306
Crosscanonby	Cumbria	54.73°N 03.44°W	NY0739
Cross Coombe	Cornwall	50.31°N 05.20°W	SW7251
Crosscrake	Cumbria	54.26°N 02.73°W	SD5286
Crossdale Street	Norfolk	52.90°N 01.29°E	TG2239
Cross End	Bedfordshire	52.21°N 00.44°W	TL0658
Cross End	Milton Keynes	52.02°N 00.67°W	SP9137
Cross End	Essex	51.96°N 00.69°E	TL8533
Crossens	Sefton	53.66°N 02.95°W	SD3719
Crossflatts	Bradford	53.85°N 01.84°W	SE1040
Crossford	South Lanarkshire	55.69°N 03.87°W	NS8246
Crossford	Fife	56.05°N 03.51°W	NT0686
Crossgate	Cornwall	50.66°N 04.35°W	SX3488
Cross Gate	West Sussex	50.90°N 00.52°W	TQ0413
Crossgate	Staffordshire	52.93°N 02.09°W	SJ9437
Crossgate	Lincolnshire	52.81°N 00.16°W	TF2426
Crossgates	Powys	52.26°N 03.34°W	SO0864
Crossgates	Cumbria	54.57°N 03.44°W	NY0721
Crossgates	North Yorkshire	54.24°N 00.42°W	TA0384
Cross Gates	Bradford	53.84°N 01.86°W	SE0939
Cross Gates	Leeds	53.80°N 01.47°W	SE3534
Crossgates	Fife	56.07°N 03.38°W	NT1488
Crossgill	Cumbria	54.75°N 02.40°W	NY7440
Crossgill	Lancashire	54.05°N 02.68°W	SD5562
Cross Green	Devon	50.66°N 04.29°W	SX3888
Cross Green (Hitcham)	Suffolk	52.13°N 00.89°E	TL9852
Cross Green (Cockfield)	Suffolk	52.16°N 00.76°E	TL8955
Cross Green (Hartest)	Suffolk	52.14°N 00.67°E	TL8353
Cross Green	Leeds	53.78°N 01.51°W	SE3232
Crossgreen	Shropshire	52.73°N 02.78°W	SJ4716
Cross Green	Shropshire	52.70°N 02.57°W	SJ6112
Cross Green	Staffordshire	52.64°N 02.13°W	SJ9105
Cross Hands	Pembrokeshire	51.77°N 04.79°W	SN0712
Crosshands	Carmarthenshire	51.86°N 04.63°W	SN1922
Cross Hands	Carmarthenshire	51.78°N 04.08°W	SN5612
Cross Heath	Staffordshire	53.02°N 02.23°W	SJ8447
Cross Hill	Cornwall	50.53°N 04.76°W	SX0474
Cross Hill	Gloucestershire	51.66°N 02.65°W	ST5596
Crosshill	East Ayrshire	55.48°N 04.42°W	NS4724
Crosshill	South Ayrshire	55.31°N 04.64°W	NS3206
Cross Hill	Derbyshire	53.02°N 01.39°W	SK4148
Crosshill	Fife	56.15°N 03.33°W	NT1796
Cross Hills	North Yorkshire	53.89°N 02.00°W	SE0044
Cross Holme	North Yorkshire	54.35°N 01.13°W	SE5696
Crosshouse	East Ayrshire	55.60°N 04.55°W	NS3938
Cross Houses (Bridgnorth)	Shropshire	52.51°N 02.45°W	SO6991
Cross Houses (Berrington)	Shropshire	52.65°N 02.68°W	SJ5407
Cross in Hand	East Sussex	50.96°N 00.20°E	TQ5521
Cross Inn (Dyffryn Arth)	Ceredigion	52.25°N 04.14°W	SN5464
Cross Inn (Llanllwchaiarn)	Ceredigion	52.18°N 04.37°W	SN3857
Cross Inn	Carmarthenshire	51.78°N 04.48°W	SN2912
Cross Inn	Rhondda, Cynon, Taff	51.53°N 03.37°W	ST0583
Crosskeys	Caerphilly	51.61°N 03.12°W	ST2291
Cross Keys	Kent	51.25°N 00.16°E	TQ5153
Cross Keys	Wiltshire	51.43°N 02.18°W	ST8771
Crosskirk	Highland	58.59°N 03.67°W	ND0369
Crosslands	Cumbria	54.29°N 03.01°W	SD3489
Cross Lane	Cheshire	53.13°N 02.49°W	SJ6760
Cross Lane Head	Shropshire	52.55°N 02.44°W	SO7095
Cross Lanes	Dorset	50.81°N 02.34°W	ST7602
Cross Lanes	Cornwall	50.04°N 05.22°W	SW6921
Cross Lanes	Oxfordshire	51.49°N 01.03°W	SU6778
Cross Lanes	North Yorkshire	54.07°N 01.20°W	SE5265
Cross Lanes	Wrexham	53.01°N 02.94°W	SJ3747
Crosslanes	Shropshire	52.75°N 03.00°W	SJ3218
Crosslee	Renfrewshire	55.86°N 04.55°W	NS4066
Crossley Hall	Bradford	53.79°N 01.80°W	SE1333
Cross Llyde	Herefordshire	51.93°N 02.84°W	SO4227
Crossmichael	Dumfries and Galloway	54.97°N 03.98°W	NX7366
Crossmill	East Renfrewshire	55.80°N 04.39°W	NS5059
Crossmoor	Lancashire	53.83°N 02.85°W	SD4438
Crossmyloof	City of Glasgow	55.83°N 04.28°W	NS5762
Crossness	Bexley	51.508°N 0.138°W	TQ484810
Cross Oak	Powys	51.89°N 03.30°W	SO1023
Cross of Jackston	Aberdeenshire	57.37°N 02.43°W	NJ7432
Cross o'th hands	Derbyshire	53.01°N 01.58°W	SK2846
Cross o' th' Hill	Cheshire	53.01°N 02.76°W	SJ4947
Crosspost	West Sussex	50.98°N 00.22°W	TQ2522
Crossroads	Aberdeenshire	57.03°N 02.41°W	NO7594
Cross Roads	Bradford	53.82°N 01.94°W	SE0437
Cross Roads	Devon	50.65°N 04.19°W	SX4586
Crossroads	East Ayrshire	55.57°N 04.42°W	NS4734
Crossroads	Fife	56.17°N 03.03°W	NT3699
Cross Street	Suffolk	52.33°N 01.19°E	TM1876
Crosston	Angus	56.69°N 02.78°W	NO5256
Crosstown	Cornwall	50.90°N 04.56°W	SS2015
Crosstown	The Vale Of Glamorgan	51.41°N 03.38°W	ST0469
Cross Town	Cheshire	53.29°N 02.37°W	SJ7578
Crosswater	Surrey	51.14°N 00.78°W	SU8539
Crossway	Powys	52.21°N 03.39°W	SO0558
Crossway	Monmouthshire	51.86°N 02.81°W	SO4419
Crossway	Herefordshire	51.97°N 02.56°W	SO6131
Crossway Green	Worcestershire	52.31°N 02.23°W	SO8468
Crossway Green	Monmouthshire	51.64°N 02.69°W	ST5294
Crossways	Dorset	50.69°N 02.32°W	SY7788
Crossways	Monmouthshire	51.87°N 02.98°W	SO3220
Crossways	South Gloucestershire	51.60°N 02.50°W	ST6590
Crossways	Surrey	51.13°N 00.78°W	SU8538
Crosswell	Pembrokeshire	51.99°N 04.73°W	SN1236
Crosswood	Ceredigion	52.32°N 03.96°W	SN6672
Crosthwaite	Cumbria	54.31°N 02.86°W	SD4491
Croston	Lancashire	53.66°N 02.78°W	SD4819
Crostwick	Norfolk	52.69°N 01.32°E	TG2516
