= Crossgate =

Crossgate or Cross Gate may refer to:

- Crossgate, County Durham, England
- Crossgate, Kentucky, United States
- Crossgate, Lincolnshire, England
- Cross Gate, an online role-playing game
- Crossgate AG, International B2B Company
- A railroad crossing gate, see Level crossing
- Crossgate Farmhouse, Cornwall, England

== See also ==
- Crossgates (disambiguation)
