= Cross Hill =

Cross Hill or Crosshill may refer to:

== Places ==
- Cross Hill, Cornwall, England
- Cross Hill, Derbyshire, England
- Cross Hill, Gloucestershire, England
- Cross Hill, South Carolina, USA
- Crosshill, East Ayrshire, Scotland
- Crosshill, Fife, Scotland
- Crosshill, Glasgow, Scotland
- Crosshill, an area of Baillieston, Scotland
- Crosshill, South Ayrshire, Scotland
- Crosshill, Wellesley, Regional Municipality of Waterloo, Ontario, Canada

== See also ==
- Cross Hills
- Hill of Crosses
