= Crossgates =

Crossgates may refer to:

- Cross Gates, Leeds, an area in the east of the city
- Crossgates, Cumbria, England
- Crossgates, North Yorkshire, England
- Crossgates, Fife, a village in Scotland
- Crossgates, Powys, a village in Wales
- Crossgates Commons, a shopping plaza in New York, United States
- Crossgates Mall, a shopping mall in New York, United States

== See also ==
- Crossgate (disambiguation)
