= Hero Must Die =

2007 video game

- Artwork for the Vita remake.
- Developer(s): Pyramid
- Publisher(s): G-Mode (Mobile); Nippon Ichi Software (Vita)
- Director(s): Hiroki Sonoda
- Producer(s): Kyoko Kawakami; Jun Meishi; Moto Suganuma (Vita)
- Designer(s): Shoji Masuda
- Artist(s): Shunya Yamashita; Tetsu Kurosawa (Vita)
- Writer(s): Shoji Masuda
- Composer(s): Kenji Ito
- Platform(s): Mobile; PlayStation Vita; PlayStation 4 Nintendo Switch; Microsoft Windows
- Release: DoCoMO: JP: December 25, 2007; SoftBank: JP: May 1, 2008; EZweb: JP: September 18, 2008; Nintendo Switch: JP: October 1, 2020; Remake; PlayStation Vita: JP: February 25, 2016; PlayStation 4 Microsoft Windows: WW: February 26, 2020; Nintendo Switch: WW: February 27, 2020
- Genre(s): Role-playing

Hero Must Die (Japanese: 勇者死す。, Hepburn: Yūsha Shisu.) is a role-playing video game developed by Pyramid and originally released for the DoCoMO mobile service in December 2007. It was later released for SoftBank and EZweb in 2008, and a "Director's Cut" version was released for DoCoMO in May 2009. A full remake for the PlayStation Vita was released in February 2016. In all versions, players navigate both an overworld and localized environments, with fights using a turn-based battle system. Hero Must Die takes place over five days, and features the last exploits of an unnamed hero after he defeats the Dark Lord Guille at the cost of his life and is given a last chance to explore the world he saved and potentially solve some lingering problems.

The concept of Hero Must Die was developed by its scenario writer and designer Shoji Masuda based on his experiences of watching his father deteriorate from cirrhosis. The characters were designed by Shunya Yamashita, who both had creative freedom and was asked to adjust many of his designs. The music was composed by Kenji Ito, and was his first time working on a mobile game. The mobile version of the game stopped network distribution in 2012. The remake was announced in 2015, and included expanded content, new characters, and redone environments. Reception of both versions of the game has been positive.

== Gameplay ==
Battle gameplay for the original version (above) and its remake (below). The two versions share design elements, and have several differences in graphical quality and other mechanics.

Hero Must Die is a role-playing video game which puts players into the role of an unnamed hero. The game world is navigated through both an overworld map, and town and dungeon environments seen from a side-scrolling perspective. Set within a five-day time limit, which equates to eight to ten hours in realtime, the hero travels through the world after defeating the "final boss", completing quests for various people and races within the world. Battles are initiated upon touching an enemy icon, and battles take place from an angled, third-person view. The battle system uses a turn-based system, where each member of the party is given set commands: they can attack with their weapon, use magic, defend against attacks, or flee the battle.

As time progresses in-game, the hero's stats gradually decrease until he "dies" at the end of the game, and some effects include forgetting abilities. Companions met by the hero during the game aid him in battle during this period. Actions taken by the player, such as the amount of time the hero is active, can cause his stats to decrease faster than normal. The remake carries over the same basic elements as the original, except with some additional elements. All environments and characters are rendered in 3D, and at the end of each five day cycle, the player can save their progress and transfer data across to a new game.

== Synopsis ==
The story of Hero Must Die takes place after the unnamed hero defeats the dark beast Satan. While victorious, the hero is killed in battle. A benevolent angel takes pity on him and decides to grant him five more days of life, during which time he can explore the land he helped liberate and help sort out the problems of others that still linger in the aftermath of Satan's defeat: these include former companions and others who helped him on his quest. At the end of the five days, the hero dies and his soul is taken by the angel to heaven. Depending on the players actions, differing numbers of people attend the hero's funeral, offering varying elegies. A different heroine with which the hero was intimate also attends to mourn his passing.

== Development ==
Hero Must Die was developed by game developer Pyramid. The staff included designer and story writer Shoji Masuda, producers Kyoko Kawakami and Jun Meishi, the latter of whom worked on Patapon and a video game based on Record of Lodoss War; and production manager Junichi Kashiwagi, who worked on Chaos Seed. The game's production was handled and augmented by G-Mode. The earliest concept for Hero Must Die was created in 1999, while he was working on Ore no Shikabane wo Koete Yuke. Masuda drew from own experiences of living through his father's deterioration after receiving surgery for cirrhosis in 1995: despite the surgery being successful, Masuda's father was given ten years to live. During this period, Masuda watched his father slowly become weaker, and at the funeral in 2005 he realized that he had not had the time he wanted with his father due to various circumstances. These experiences formed the core concepts for Hero Must Die: its main theme was choosing what to do within a limited amount of time. According to Masuda, while this setup had been done in film and television, he had yet to see it done in video games. The playtime was intended to be short, approximately six to eight hours, so people could play it during commutes across a week. Another element was the hero giving gifts to people in need to his own detriment, a theme compared by Masuda to "The Happy Prince" by Oscar Wilde. Incorporating this theme into the entire work proved taxing for him. His proposal was initially rejected by multiple developers, but after putting it up on his web page as a kind of joke, his proposal was seen and accepted by Meishi and began production. Mobile phones were chosen as the platform due to budgetary issues and the projected production period. According to Masuda, many of the game's more distinguished staff were suggested by Pyramid.

The characters were designed by Shunya Yamashita, whose previous work included character designs for Final Fantasy X and Valkyrie Profile 2: Silmeria. With some exceptions, Yamashita was not given specific guidelines for his character designs. During his work, he received numerous requests for "corrections" to his designs, increasing his workload. The main protagonists took the longest to design, as Yamashita wanted players to empathize with his situation. The logo was designed by Yuji Ogikubo. The music was composed by Kenji Ito, whose previous work included scoring for games in the Mana and SaGa series. While he had arranged some of his previous pieces for mobile devices as ringtones, the majority of his recent work to that point was for the PlayStation 2 and Nintendo DS. Hero Must Die was the first time he had written an original score for a mobile title. A priority was keeping the music of high quality while taking the differing specifications of mobile phones into account. He received a considerable amount of help from G-Mode staff in this respect.

== Releases ==
Hero Must Die was first released on December 25, 2007 for the NTT DoCoMo service. It was later released for SoftBank Mobile on May 1, 2008 and for EZweb on September 18, 2008. A "Director's Cut" was released for DoCoMo on May 25, 2009. According to Masuda, the "Director's Cut" added more content and better balanced aspects of the gameplay and story, while being available for a lower price than earlier versions. The original three versions required a monthly fee of ¥525. The "Director's Cut" had a lower monthly fee of ¥315. The original version of the game ceased distribution in 2012.

A full remake for the PlayStation Vita was announced in July 2015. Developed by Pyramid and published by Nippon Ichi Software, Masuda returned to design and write the game, along with handling general planning. The characters were redesigned by Tetsu Kurosawa. Ito returned to both rearrange original tracks and composer new music for the remake. When creating the remake, Masuda set himself the goals of rebuilding the game from the ground up, making the game in full 3D using modern technology, expanding the original playtime from under ten hours to 50–60 hours, including voices for the main characters, and adding new characters. Some elements included in the remake were intended for the original but cut due to hardware limitations. A downloadable demo, which allowed players to go through one five-day cycle, was released on February 10. The remake was originally scheduled for release on February 15, 2016. It eventually released on February 25.

A version for the PlayStation 4, Nintendo Switch and PC titled Hero Must Die. Again was released in February 2020.

The original version release of Hero Must Die was rereleased by G-Mode Corp for the Nintendo Switch on October 1, 2020.

== Reception ==
Reception

Review score
Publication	Score
Famitsu	34/40 (Vita)

In a review of the original mobile version, Japanese gaming site Game Watch Impress was overall impressed: the reviewer praised its unique premise, its gameplay, and the variety of events present. Criticism was laid towards elements of its time system and the fact that there was no impact on future playthroughs based on players' actions. RPGamer, in a piece about the remake's announcement, said that the game had "incredible" replay value and positively said Hero Must Die was an "odd enough duck". In its review of the Vita version, Famitsu praised the game's mechanics, favorably comparing it to Masuda's work on Linda Cube and Oreshika, and generally enjoyed the replay value. Ito's music was also cited as a "pleasant" addition. Criticism was given to the inability to speed up dialogue and battle times, elements of trial and error in early stages, and some of the choices given to the player being too harsh.
