= Kenji Ito =

Japanese music composer (born 1968)

- 伊藤 賢治
- Born: July 5, 1968 (age 58); Tokyo, Japan
- Other name: Itoken
- Occupations: Composer, musician
- Years active: 1990–present
- Employer: Square (1990–2001)
- Musical career
- Instruments: Piano, clarinet, alto saxophone

Kenji Ito (伊藤 賢治, Itō Kenji; born July 5, 1968), also known by the nickname Itoken (イトケン), (Note: Not to be confused with the multi-instrumentalist Itoken of Harpy, zuppa di pesce, Itoken Trio, Kuricorder Pops Orchestra, and others.) is a Japanese video game composer and musician. He is best known for his work on the Mana and SaGa series, though he has worked on over 30 video games throughout his career as well as composed or arranged music for over 15 other albums, concerts, and plays. He learned to play several instruments at a young age, and joined Square directly out of college as a composer in 1990 at the advice of a professor. He worked there for over a decade, composing many of his best-known scores. In 2001, he left Square to become a freelance composer, but has since continued to collaborate with the company.

Since leaving Square, Ito has composed soundtracks to over a dozen games, and has branched out into composition and production of music for plays and albums for other performers. Ito's work has been performed in a concert dedicated to his pieces as well as general video game music events, and he has played the piano in additional concerts. Pieces of his from the SaGa and Mana series have been arranged as piano solos and published in sheet music books.

== Biography ==
=== Early life ===
Born in Tokyo, Japan, on July 5, 1968, Ito became interested in music at the age of four. He began to learn to play the piano, becoming interested in it after hearing piano music coming from a classroom he passed by daily with his mother. He was also interested in Electone music, but was discouraged from learning it by a piano teacher. By the time he began composing at the age of ten, he had learned to play alto saxophone, clarinet, and piano, and was interested in becoming a singer/songwriter. When he was close to graduating from college, he decided to pursue a career in composing music; when he asked a professor for advice, the professor recommended becoming a video game music composer, given the recent success in Japan of Dragon Quest III. During March 1990, after applying to several video game companies including HAL Laboratory, Ito began working at Square.

=== Career ===
His first project was a co-effort that same year between himself and Nobuo Uematsu for the Game Boy title Final Fantasy Legend II (SaGa 2). It led the following year to the first album release of his music, All Sounds of SaGa, which was a combination album of The Final Fantasy Legend, Final Fantasy Legend II, and Final Fantasy Legend III; all of Ito's work on Legend II appeared on the album. Shortly after in 1991, he composed his first solo work, the soundtrack for Final Fantasy Adventure (Seiken Densetsu), another Game Boy title. He then returned to the SaGa series for the next few years, composing the soundtracks to the Super Famicom's Romancing SaGa, Romancing SaGa 2, and Romancing SaGa 3. These soundtracks sparked Ito's first arranged albums; the first game was arranged in a French musical style by Masaaki Mizuguchi, while the other two were arranged by Ryou Fukui and Taro Iwashiro, respectively, into orchestral pieces. Ito was originally scheduled to continue on with the Mana series and compose the soundtrack to Seiken Densetsu 2 (Secret of Mana), but was forced to hand the project off to Hiroki Kikuta as his first score due to the demand on his time for scoring Romancing SaGa.

1995 marked the first time since he started composing that he worked on a title outside the Mana or SaGa series; he composed the music for Koi wa Balance and was a member of an eight-person team for Tobal No. 1. He returned to the SaGa series in 1997 with SaGa Frontier, and finished out the decade with Chocobo Racing and Chocobo's Dungeon 2; for Chocobo Racing he only arranged previous works from the Chocobo and Final Fantasy series, and contributed only a few tracks to Chocobo's Dungeon 2. He left Square in 2001 to become a freelance composer. He has said that this move was in order to give him the flexibility to work on more than just video game music.

The first work that Ito composed after leaving Square was the soundtrack to Culdcept II, which he regards as his best work. He attributes this feeling both to the fact that it was his first freelance piece and that he handled all aspects of the music production, from composition through arrangement and sound production. From there he returned to working with Square and the Mana series with the remake of his second soundtrack, Final Fantasy Adventure, into the soundtrack of Sword of Mana. It was an act he would repeat two years later for Square, now Square Enix, with the remake of Romancing SaGa, Romancing SaGa: Minstrel Song. He has since returned to the Mana series twice, with the soundtracks to Children of Mana and Dawn of Mana. All of the video game soundtracks that he has composed since the third expansion pack for Cross Gate in 2004 have been with the assistance of other composers except for 2007's Hero Must Die, though during those years he has branched out from video games into composing and producing albums and singles for performers as well as composing music for plays and concerts. He has also released an album of piano pieces that he has composed; only two of the eight tracks are from his video game works.

== Legacy ==
Ito performed piano live during September 22, 2006 Press Start 2006 -Symphony of Games- live concert, at which several of his pieces were performed by an orchestra. This concert followed a concert of August 26, 2006 Manami Kiyota x Kenji Ito Collaboration Live in which he played the piano for songs composed by him for the event and sung by Manami Kiyota; he has also played the piano at concerts given by The Black Mages, a band composed of current or former Square musicians, before they expanded to include a full-time pianist. Music composed by Ito has also been performed at the Extra -Hyper Game Music Event 2007 and Christmas Live 2008 "gentleecho -prelude-" concerts.

Music composed by Ito was performed at a concert devoted to his music on February 21, 2009 titled "gentle echo meeting" at the Uchisaiwaicho Hall in Chiyoda, Tokyo. A group of five musicians performed eight of his songs, interspersed with performances by Ito and discussions about his music between himself and Masahiro Sakurai. The event began as a concert due to Ito's wish to host one based on his music, but after the space the organizing company, Harmonics International, rented turned out to be run by a high school classmate of Ito, at the classmate's insistence the discussions of Ito's music were added to the program.

Music from the original soundtracks of Dawn of Mana and Sword of Mana has been arranged for the piano and published by DOREMI Music Publishing. Two compilation books of music from the series as a whole have also been published as Seiken Densetsu Best Collection Piano Solo Sheet Music first and second editions, with the first edition including tracks by Ito from Final Fantasy Adventure while the second added tracks he composed from Dawn of Mana. All songs in each book have been rewritten by Asako Niwa as beginning to intermediate level piano solos, though they are meant to sound as much like the originals as possible. Additionally, KMP Music Publishing has published a book of the piano music included in the Sword of Mana soundtrack album, which Ito arranged from his original compositions. DOREMI Music Publishing also published music from the original soundtracks of some of the SaGa games that Ito composed as piano sheet music book; music from Romancing SaGa 3, Romancing SaGa Minstrel Song, and SaGa Frontier were written by Asako Niwa for piano solos of beginning to intermediate difficulty.

== Musical style and influences ==
Ito's music is mainly inspired by images from the game rather than outside influences; however, he never played the games themselves. The only video games that he plays are sports games; he has only seen up to the introductory movie for most of the role-playing games that he has written music for. While many of his pieces are orchestral, he enjoys working in a recording studio and enjoys composing "normal songs" as much as his orchestral works. His favorite video game music from other composers include the music from Star Fox, Dragon Quest, Final Fantasy, Wizardry and Nobunaga's Ambition. Non-video game music that has inspired him includes Japanese popular music and soundtracks to anime works, as well as easy listening music such as Paul Mauriat or Richard Clayderman, especially string music. These influences have led him to wish to create music "that you can listen to while you relax". He also wishes to expand his compositions outside video game music and into ballads.

== Works ==
=== Video games ===
Video games scores composed by Kenji Ito
Year	Game	Notes	Ref.
1990	Final Fantasy Legend II	Music with Nobuo Uematsu	
1991	Final Fantasy Adventure	Music	
1991	Final Fantasy IV	Sound effects	
1992	Romancing SaGa	Music	
1992	Final Fantasy V	Sound effects	
1993	Secret of Mana	Sound effects	
1993	Romancing SaGa 2	Music	
1995	Romancing SaGa 3	Music	
1996	Koi wa Balance: Battle of Lovers	Music	
1996	Tobal No. 1	Music with various others	
1997	SaGa Frontier	Music	
1998	Chocobo's Dungeon 2	Music with Tsuyoshi Sekito, Yasuhiro Kawakami, and Kumi Tanioka	
1999	Chocobo Racing	Music	
2000	Gekikuukan Pro Baseball: The End of the Century 1999	Music	
2001	Wild Card	Music	
2001	Culdcept Second	Music	
2001	Cross Gate	Music	
2003	Sword of Mana	Music	
2004	Shadow Hearts: Covenant	Music with Yoshitaka Hirota, Yasunori Mitsuda, and Tomoko Kobayashi	
2005	Romancing SaGa: Minstrel Song	Music with Tsuyoshi Sekito	
2005	Hanjuku Hero 4: 7-Jin no Hanjuku Hero	Music with many others	
2006	Monster Kingdom: Jewel Summoner	Music with many others	
2006	Children of Mana	Music with Masaharu Iwata and Takayuki Aihara	
2006	Pop'n Music 13 Carnival	"Battle XIII"	
2006	Dawn of Mana	Music with Tsuyoshi Sekito, Masayoshi Soken, and Ryuichi Sakamoto	
2007	Concerto Gate	Music with Hiroki Kikuta	
2007	Hero Must Die	Music	
2008	Mabinogi	Arrangements	
2008	Super Smash Bros. Brawl	Arrangements (Note: "Space Armada", "Attack", and "Title (Kid Icarus)")	
2008	Lux-Pain	Music with Yasuyuki Suzuki	
2008	Pop'n Music 16 Party	"Dance to Blue"	
2008	Culdcept Saga	Music	
2009	Pokémon Mystery Dungeon: Adventure Team	Music with several others	
2009	SaGa 2: Goddess of Destiny	Arrangements	
2009	GuitarFreaks & DrumMania V6 Blazing	Music with many others	
2011	Shin Megami Tensei: Devil Survivor 2	Music with Atlus sound team	
2011	Half-Minute Hero: The Second Coming	"One Winged Hero ~ Theme of Yusha"	
2012	Puzzle & Dragons	Music with Yukio Nakajima	
2012	Culdcept (3DS)	Music	
2012	Hyperdimension Neptunia Victory	Music with Kenji Kaneko and Nobuo Uematsu	
2012	Demons' Score	"Requiem from Lilith"	
2013	Oceanhorn: Monster of Uncharted Seas	Music with Kalle Ylitalo and Nobuo Uematsu	
2013	Getsuei Gakuen	Music with Daisuke Ishiwatari	
2013	Puzzle & Dragons Z	Music with Yukio Nakajima	
2014	Rise of Mana	"Fear the Messenger"	
2014	Puzzle & Dragons Battle Tournament	Music	
2014	Terra Battle	Music with several others	
2014	Super Smash Bros. for Nintendo 3DS and Wii U	Arrangements (Note: "Mute City Ver. 3", "Super Hoop", and "Culdcept")	
2015	Chronos Ring	Music with Yoko Shimomura and Evan Call	
2015	Chunithm: Seelisch Tact	"Gustav Battle"	
2015	Shinyaku Arcana Slayer	Music	
2016	Hero Must Die. Again	Music	
2016	Culdcept Revolt	Music	
2016	Puzzle & Dragons X	Music with Yuzo Koshiro, Akira Yamaoka, and Keigo Ozaki	
2016	SaGa: Scarlet Grace	Music	
2016	Adventures of Mana	Music	
2018	Super Smash Bros. Ultimate	Arrangements (Note: "Beginning")	
2018	Romancing SaGa Re;univerSe	Music	
2019	Rakugaki Kingdom	"Indomitable Soul"	
2022	Sin Chronicle	"Last Determination"	
2024	SaGa: Emerald Beyond	Music	
2024	Romancing SaGa 2: Revenge of the Seven	Music	

=== Other ===
Composition

- Kokoro no Takarabako (1999) – single by Hiromi Ōta
- Seishun no Fu / Midarete Atsuki Wagami niwa (2002) – concert
- ~Canaria~ (2002) – single by Muneyuki Satoh
- Touson Dairoku Shishu (2002) – album by Ikuyo Ueda
- Muneyuki Sato All Songs Collection (2003) – album by Muneyuki Satoh
- Hajimari no Daichi (2006) – album by Manami Kiyota
- Our Endless Night -The spring time of life (2006) – concert by Manami Kiyota; with many others
- Manami Kiyota x Kenji Ito Collaboration Live (2006) – concert by Manami Kiyota
- Maou Kourin 'Live SIDE & Evil SIDE' (2006) – play with many others
- Kenji Ito Piano Works Collection ~Everlasting Melodies~ (2006) – includes one piece from Romancing SaGa 2, and one from Chocobo Racing
- Kono Aozora ni Yakusoku o (2007) – anime
- Boku wa Tomodachi ga Sukunai (2011) – anime ep 5
- The Girl in Twilight (2018) – anime; main theme
- Braverthday (2018) – album by Nobuhiko Okamoto; "Tsugi wa Kimi ga Shuyaku no Ban da"
- Arad Senki: The Wheel of Reversal (2020) – anime

Arrangement

- "Ai no Sumika"~"Hyouhaku no Toki /Komoro Nikki -Touson no Fuyuko" Stage Music Collection~ (1999) – album by Kyoko Fujimoto
- Hyouhaku no Toki/ Touson to Fuyuko (2001) – concert
- Katakoi (2002) – single by Muneyuki Satoh
- Soredemo Kisetsu wa (2002) – single by Muneyuki Satoh
- Tougenkyo -Masashi Sada Chromatic Harmonica Music Collection- (2002) – album by Etsuko Kitani
- Mirai (2003) – album by Yusuke Matsumoto

== See also ==
- Music of the Mana series
- Music of the SaGa series
- Music of the Chocobo series
