= Music of the SaGa series =

Music of the video game series SaGa

SaGa is a series of science fiction role-playing video games produced by Square, now Square Enix. The series originated on the Game Boy in 1989 as the creation of Akitoshi Kawazu. It has since continued across multiple platforms, from the Super Nintendo Entertainment System to the PlayStation 2, and like the Final Fantasy series, the story in each SaGa game is independent of its counterparts. The music of the SaGa series consists of musical scores and arranged albums from various composers. Some of these composers have created soundtracks and pieces for other Square Enix franchises including the Final Fantasy series and Mana series. The SaGa series is divided up between the original series, released as the Final Fantasy Legend series in North America, the Romancing SaGa series, the SaGa Frontier series, and Unlimited SaGa.

The music of the original series was composed by Nobuo Uematsu, Kenji Ito, Ryuji Sasai, and Chihiro Fujioka. Ito went on to be the composer for the Romancing SaGa series, with each arranged album from the series arranged by a different artist off of Ito's work. Ito composed the soundtrack for the first game of the SaGa Frontier series, but was replaced by Masashi Hamauzu for the second game of the series and Unlimited SaGa. Music from the original soundtracks of the SaGa games has been arranged as sheet music for the piano and published by DOREMI Music Publishing, while tracks from Romancing SaGa Minstrel Song were played at the Press Start -Symphony of Games- 2006 concert and Extra: Hyper Game Music Event 2007 concert in Tokyo and a piece from SaGa Frontier 2 was played at the fifth Symphonic Game Music Concert, held in Leipzig, Germany on August 22, 2007.

== SaGa ==
The original SaGa series consists of Makai Toushi Sa·Ga (lit. "Warrior in the Tower of the Spirit World ~ Sa·Ga"), released for the Game Boy in 1989, Sa·Ga2: Hihō Densetsu ("Sa·Ga2 ~ The Treasure Legend"), and Jikuu no Hasha ~ Sa·Ga 3 [Kanketsu Hen] ("The Ruler of Time and Space ~ Sa·Ga3 [Final Chapter]"), both of which were released for the Game Boy in 1990. The three games were published in North America as The Final Fantasy Legend, Final Fantasy Legend II, and Final Fantasy Legend III. The original releases spawned only one album to date, a combined soundtrack album for all three games. Another album was released in Japan on September 9, 2009, SaGa 2 Hihou Densetsu Goddess of Destiny Original Soundtrack, which is the soundtrack album for the Nintendo DS remake of SaGa 2, SaGa 2 Hihou Densetsu Goddess of Destiny. The soundtrack for the DS remake of SaGa 3, SaGa 3 Jikuu no Hasha Shadow or Light Original Soundtrack, was released on January 12, 2011.

The music of SaGa 1 was composed by Nobuo Uematsu, and that of SaGa 2 by Uematsu and Kenji Ito, while the music of SaGa 3 was composed by Ryuji Sasai and Chihiro Fujioka. Uematsu has stated that while SaGa 1's music could be made of better quality, the emphasis was on enjoying the game, and not solely its appearance or sound. The Game Boy's sound hardware was different from that of the Famicom, which Uematsu was used to composing for at the time, with new stereo and waveforms and only three notes; as a result, Uematsu struggled with deciding how to work with these, developing new themes for the music in the process despite SaGa 1's director Akitoshi Kawazu's desire to have the music be in the same vein as Square's preceding Final Fantasy titles. Uematsu has stated that the Game Boy was a system he would like to compose for again. SaGa 2 was the first soundtrack or album that Kenji Ito worked on.

=== All Sounds of SaGa ===
All Sounds of SaGa

Soundtrack album by Nobuo Uematsu, Kenji Ito, Ryuji Sasai, Chihiro Fujioka
- Released: December 21, 1991; December 15, 2004
- Genre: Video game soundtrack
- Length: 1:28:18
- Labels: NTT Publishing/Square; NTT Publishing (re-release)

All Sounds of SaGa is a compilation album of the soundtracks for The Final Fantasy Legend, Final Fantasy Legend II, and Final Fantasy Legend III. The first album of the two-disc set is split between 15 tracks from SaGa 1 and 19 tracks from SaGa 2, while the second disc holds 20 SaGa 3 tracks and an arranged medley of SaGa 1 tracks by Uematsu. The album was published on December 21, 1991, by NTT Publishing/Square with a catalog number of N32D-007/8 and re-released on December 15, 2004, by NTT Publishing with a catalog number of NTCP-1004/5. The album has a total length of 1:28:18 and 55 tracks.

The soundtrack was well received by reviewers such as Patrick Gann of RPGFan, who held that it contained some of the "best composition[s]" in any video game soundtrack. He credited the excellence of the soundtrack to the limited audio resources the composers had to work with on the Game Boy, which in his opinion forced them to be more creative in their compositions. He did note, however, that he felt that the extra arranged medley, while good, was not "anything special". Kero Hazel from Square Enix Music Online had similar comments on the album, praising the composition of the album and its ability to "push the Game Boy sound hardware to its limit", and also felt the arranged medley was lacking. Hazel added that in their opinion the sound quality of the recording equipment used was not as high-quality as would be expected.

Track list

Disc 1
No.	Title	Japanese title	Length
1.	"Prologue"	プロローグ	2:11
2.	"Main Theme"	メインテーマ	1:38
3.	"Town Theme"	街のテーマ	1:46
4.	"Fight"	戦闘	1:35
5.	"Eat the Meat"	Eat the meat	0:40
6.	"Demon Cave"	魔窟	1:46
7.	"Hurry Up!"	Hurry up!	1:20
8.	"Fierce Battle"	激闘	1:25
9.	"Requiem"	レクイエム	1:02
10.	"Forbidden Tower"	禁断の塔	1:22
11.	"Heartful Tears"	涙を拭いて	2:27
12.	"Knights of the Demon World Tower"	魔界塔士	1:17
13.	"The Highest Floor"	最上階	0:57
14.	"Furious Battle"	怒闘	1:47
15.	"Epilogue"	エピローグ	2:31
16.	"The Legend Begins"	伝説は始まる	1:52
17.	"Searching for the Secret Treasure"	秘宝を求めて	1:08
18.	"Lethal Strike"	必殺の一撃	1:33
19.	"Eat the Meat"	Eat the meat	0:41
20.	"Peaceful World"	安らぎの大地	2:26
21.	"Adventurer's Theme"	勇者のテーマ	1:04
22.	"Pillar of Heaven"	天の柱	1:12
23.	"Through the Cramped Darkness"	闇の狭間で	1:13
24.	"Wandering Spirit"	さまよえる魂	1:23
25.	"Theme of the New God"	新しき神のテーマ	0:57
26.	"Ah!!"	あっ!!	0:18
27.	"Decisive Battle"	死闘の果てに	1:15
28.	"Mystery of the Secret Treasure"	秘宝の謎	2:10
29.	"Never Give Up"	Never give up	1:32
30.	"Heartful Tears"	涙を拭いて	2:23
31.	"Burning Blood"	燃える血潮	1:46
32.	"Save the World"	Save the world	1:41
33.	"Ending Theme 1"	エンディングテーマ1	2:31
34.	"Ending Theme 2"	エンディングテーマ2	0:38

Disc 2
No.	Title	Japanese title	Length
1.	"Opening"	オープニング	1:25
2.	"Setting off into the Future"	未来への旅立ち	0:57
3.	"Deep"	オアシス	1:22
4.	"Oasis"	ディープ	1:02
5.	"Fight!"	戦!	1:01
6.	"Holy Ruins"	聖なる遺跡	2:02
7.	"Stronghold"	要塞	1:30
8.	"Gods of Another Dimension"	異次元の神々	1:21
9.	"Eat the Meat"	Eat the meat	0:49
10.	"Warrior's Rest"	戦士の休息	1:30
11.	"Theme of Another Dimension"	異次元のテーマ	1:00
12.	"Village in a Strange Land"	異郷の町	1:47
13.	"Dungeon"	ダンジョン	0:58
14.	"Steslos"	ステスロス	1:08
15.	"Insanity"	狂気	0:45
16.	"Heartful Tears"	涙をこらえて	1:17
17.	"Dark Zone"	ダークゾーン	1:05
18.	"Laguna's Palace"	ラグナの宮殿	1:09
19.	"Spiritual Battle"	神戦	1:05
20.	"Supreme Ruler of Time and Space"	時空の覇者	1:24
21.	"SaGa Arranged Version: Journey's End (Prologue ~ Town ~ Main ~ Heartful Tears ~ Epilogue)"	Sa·Gaアレンジバージョン[Journey's End]	12:14

=== SaGa 2 Hihou Densetsu Goddess of Destiny Original Soundtrack ===
SaGa 2 Hihou Densetsu Goddess of Destiny Original Soundtrack

Soundtrack album by Nobuo Uematsu, Kenji Ito
- Released: September 9, 2009
- Genre: Video game soundtrack
- Length: 1:02:10
- Label: Square Enix

SaGa 2 Hihou Densetsu Goddess of Destiny Original Soundtrack is an album of music from the Nintendo DS remake of SaGa 2, SaGa 2 Hihou Densetsu Goddess of Destiny. The album was released by Square Enix on September 9, 2009, with the catalog number of SQEX-10171. It includes music from the original game remixed for the DS by Kenji Ito as well as eight new tracks composed for the remake by Ito. The new tracks are "Future Quest", "Muse's Paradise", "To the Lands of Another World", "Thrill! Surrounded By Enemies", "The Whereabouts of the Fierce Battles", "The Goddess of Destiny", "Twilight Courtesan Journey", and "Militant Meat". The album contains 27 tracks and has a total duration of 1:02:10.

The album was poorly received by Patrick Gann, who described it as, instead of an homage to the original sounds or a full remake with live instruments, a "half-assed synth upgrade" which left the pieces sounding neither new nor classic, but instead just dated. He concluded that the "compositions are far more interesting in their original Game Boy format than on this new arrangement".

Track list
No.	Title	Japanese title	Length
1.	"Future Quest"	フューチャー・クエスト	1:52
2.	"The Legend Begins"	伝説は始まる	4:30
3.	"Searching for the Secret Treasure"	秘宝を求めて	1:31
4.	"Muse's Paradise"	ミューズの楽園	2:56
5.	"To the Lands of Another World"	異世界の地へ	1:51
6.	"Lethal Strike"	必殺の一撃	1:48
7.	"Eat the Meat"	Eat the meat	0:48
8.	"Peaceful Land"	安らぎの大地	2:56
9.	"Thrill! Surrounded By Enemies"	ドキッ! 丸ごと敵だらけ	2:08
10.	"Hero's Theme"	勇者のテーマ	2:24
11.	"Pillar to Heaven"	天の柱	2:08
12.	"The Whereabouts of the Fierce Battles"	激闘のゆくえ	2:55
13.	"Through the Cramped Darkness"	闇の狭間で	1:55
14.	"Wandering Soul"	さまよえる魂	2:15
15.	"Theme of the New God"	新しき神のテーマ	2:01
16.	"Ah!!"	あっ!!	0:31
17.	"At the End of the Decisive Battle"	死闘の果てに	2:41
18.	"Mystery of the Secret Treasure"	秘宝の謎	4:22
19.	"Never Give Up"	Never give up	1:58
20.	"Wipe Your Tears Away"	涙を拭いて	2:58
21.	"The Goddess of Destiny"	運命の女神	3:48
22.	"Burning Blood"	燃える血潮	2:00
23.	"Save the World"	Save the world	3:36
24.	"Ending Theme 1"	エンディングテーマ1	3:16
25.	"Ending Theme 2"	エンディングテーマ2	0:44
26.	"Twilight Courtesan Journey"	たそがれ花魁道中	0:20
27.	"Militant Meat"	戦闘的肉	1:58

=== SaGa 3 Jikuu no Hasha Shadow or Light Original Soundtrack ===
SaGa 3 Jikuu no Hasha Shadow or Light Original Soundtrack

Soundtrack album by Ryuji Sasai, Kenji Ito
- Released: January 12, 2011
- Genre: Video game soundtrack
- Length: 1:12:03
- Label: Square Enix

SaGa 3 Jikuu no Hasha Shadow or Light Original Soundtrack is an album of music from the Nintendo DS remake of SaGa 3, SaGa 3 Jikuu no Hasha Shadow or Light. Square Enix released the album on January 12, 2011, with the catalog number of SQEX-10221. It includes music from the original game remixed for the DS by Ryuji Sasai and Kenji Ito, as well as new tracks composed by the two. The album contains 27 tracks and has a total duration of 1:12:03.

The album was well received by Jayson Napolitano of Original Sound Version, who described it as a rock reinterpretation of the originals. He claimed that Ito "does a stellar job throughout", and that Sasai, while not as consistent, also generally does a good job. He felt that there were only a few pieces that did not do a good job presenting their original works.

== Romancing SaGa ==
The Romancing SaGa subseries of games consists of Romancing SaGa, released in 1992 for the Super Famicom, Romancing SaGa 2, released on the Super Famicom in 1993, and Romancing SaGa 3, released on the Super Famicom in 1995. An enhanced remake of the first game was made for the PlayStation 2 in 2005 called Romancing SaGa Minstrel Song; this version was the only Romancing SaGa game to be published in North America. The series has sparked nine albums: a soundtrack album for each of the three games, an album of arrangements of Romancing SaGa 1 music in a French musical style, three albums of orchestral arrangements of music from Romancing SaGa 2, 3, and Minstrel Song, a promotional soundtrack album for Romancing SaGa 3, and a single for "Minuet", the theme song of Minstrel Song. The music for all of the Romancing SaGa series was composed by Kenji Ito, while each arranged album was arranged by a different artist and Minuet was written, composed and sung by Masayoshi Yamazaki. Ito created the music of each soundtrack based on images from the games, though he never played the games themselves.

=== Romancing SaGa Original Sound Version ===
Romancing SaGa Original Sound Version

Soundtrack album by Kenji Ito
- Released: February 21, 1992; November 25, 1995; October 1, 2004
- Genre: Video game soundtrack
- Length: 1:02:50
- Labels: Square; NTT Publishing (re-releases)

Romancing SaGa Original Sound Version is a soundtrack album for Romancing SaGa. It was composed by Kenji Ito, with the exception of one track, "Heartful Tears", which had been composed for SaGa 1 by Nobuo Uematsu and was arranged by Ito. The album covers 38 tracks and has a duration of 1:02:50. It was first published by Square on February 21, 1992, with the catalog number N25D-009, and reprinted by NTT Publishing on November 25, 1995, with the number PSCN-5036 and on October 1, 2004, with the number NTCP-5036. The first 34 tracks come from the game, while the last four tracks are bonus tracks from other games.

The soundtrack was well received by Patrick Gann, who noted Ito's ability to push the audio hardware of the Super Nintendo to its limit, with various sound effects that were beyond what other similar games were using.

Track list
No.	Title	Japanese title (literal translation)	Length
1.	"Opening - Overture...Dawn of the Romance"	オーバーチュア〜オープニングタイトル ("Overture~Opening Title")	3:27
2.	"Theme of Albert...The Young Nobleman"	アルベルト ("Albert")	1:23
3.	"Theme of Sif...Warrior of the Iced Land"	シフ ("Sif")	1:41
4.	"Theme of Claudia...Song of the Nature"	クローディア ("Claudia")	1:38
5.	"Theme of Gray...Adventurous Spirit"	グレイ ("Gray")	1:26
6.	"Theme of Jamil...Hello, My Friends!"	ジャミル ("Jamil")	2:05
7.	"Theme of Aisha...Out in the Steppe"	アイシャ ("Aisha")	2:00
8.	"Theme of Barbara...Dance Through the Road"	バーバラ ("Barbara")	1:16
9.	"Theme of Captain Hawk...Ladyluck"	キャプテンホーク ("Captain Hawk")	1:12
10.	"Step Into the Unknown"	ダンジョン1 ("Dungeon 1")	1:20
11.	"The Conflict"	バトル1 ("Battle 1")	1:57
12.	"Victory!"	勝利! ("Victory!")	0:35
13.	"Glory of the Knight"	騎士の誇り ("Glory of the Knight")	1:34
14.	"The Salute"	称号獲得 ("Title Acquisition")	0:17
15.	"Sailing the Ocean"	船旅 ("Voyage by Boat")	0:58
16.	"Palace of the Dream"	宮殿のテーマ ("Palace Theme")	1:02
17.	"Crystal City"	クリスタルシティ ("Crystal City")	1:37
18.	"Lost in the Forest"	迷いの森 ("Forest of Doubt")	1:53
19.	"The Conspiracy"	ダンジョン2 ("Dungeon 2")	0:51
20.	"Hurry Out!"	脱出! ("Escape!")	0:46
21.	"Shop Around the Town!"	南エスタミル ("South Estermil")	1:24
22.	"Horrible Shadow"	下水道 ("Sewers")	1:35
23.	"Dim Gleam of Emerald"	魔の島 ("Demon Island")	1:30
24.	"The Four Wills"	四天王ダンジョン ("Four King's Dungeon")	1:50
25.	"Beat Them Up!"	バトル2 ("Battle 2")	2:16
26.	"A Requiem"	レクイエム ("Requiem")	1:16
27.	"Deserted Village"	傷心のアイシャ ("Brokenhearted Aisha")	1:21
28.	"Theme of Solitude"	孤独のテーマ ("Theme of Solitude")	1:12
29.	"Destined Fate"	試練 ("Ordeal")	1:40
30.	"Heartful Tears"	涙を拭いて ("Wiping Ones Tears")	1:26
31.	"The Forbidden Realm"	ラストダンジョン ("Last Dungeon")	1:26
32.	"Beat of the Evil"	邪神復活 ("Revival of the Evil God")	1:15
33.	"Coup de Grace"	決戦! サルーイン ("Decisive Battle with Saluin!")	3:17
34.	"Ending Theme...The SaGa"	エンディングテーマ ("Ending Theme")	7:57
35.	"Tango Frontier"	Barbara's Tango ("Barbara's Tango")	0:19
36.	"Bard's Tale - Once Upon a Time"	冒険者のテーマ ("Adventurer's Theme")	1:24
37.	"Night of the Shooting Star"	孤独のテーマ2 ("Theme of Solitude 2")	1:13
38.	"Walking Down the Street"	エスタミル ("Estermil")	0:53

=== La Romance ===
Romancing SaGa La Romance

Soundtrack album by Masaaki Mizuguchi, Kenji Ito
- Released: July 20, 1992; November 25, 1995; October 1, 2004
- Genre: Video game soundtrack
- Length: 42:05
- Labels: Square/NTT Publishing; NTT Publishing (re-releases)

Romancing SaGa La Romance is an album of music from Romancing SaGa arranged in a French musical style by Masaaki Mizuguchi. The original tracks were composed by Kenji Ito. The 11-track album has a length of 42:05. It was first released on July 20, 1992, by Square/NTT Publishing with a catalog number of N30D-025. It was reprinted by NTT Publishing on November 25, 1995, and October 1, 2004, with the catalog numbers PSCN-5037 and NTCP-5037.

The album received mixed reviews from critics. Eve C. of RPGFan disliked the album, calling it a "disappointment" and citing that in her opinion it did not sound French, that many of the tracks were "boring", and that the arrangements were "mediocre". Patrick Gann, however, said that he was impressed with the album, applauding the instrumentation and calling it "quite the CD". Dave of Square Enix Music Online mostly agreed with Gann, calling it "extremely diverse" and full of "inspired arrangements", marred only by a couple of disappointing tracks.

Track list
No.	Title	Original track	Length
1.	"Thème d'Ouverture" ("Opening Theme")	"Overture ~ Opening Title"	3:26
2.	"Pot-pourri des Héros" ("Medley of the Heroes")	"Character Medley"	4:23
3.	"Le Palais du Rêve ~ La Ville de Cristal" ("The Palace of Dream - The Crystal City")	"Palace Theme ~ Crystal City"	4:39
4.	"Marche Vers l'Inconnu" ("Walking to the Unknown")	"Dungeon"	3:38
5.	"Echoppes Autour de la Ville" ("Stalls Around the City")	"South Estermil"	2:09
6.	"Perdu Dans la Forêt" ("Lost in the Forest")	"Forest of Doubt"	3:41
7.	"La Gloire du Chevalier" ("Glory of the Knight")	"Glory of the Knight"	4:07
8.	"Tango du Pays des Frontières" ("Tango from the Border Land")	"Barbara's Tango"	2:52
9.	"Le Village Désert ~ Thème de la Solitude" ("The Abandoned Village - Theme of Solitude")	"Brokenhearted Aisha ~ Theme of Solitude"	5:33
10.	"Il Etait une Fois : l'Histoire d'un Barde" ("Once Upon a Time: The Story of a Bard")	"Adventurer's Theme"	3:34
11.	"Thème Final... La SaGa" ("Ending Theme... The SaGa")	"Ending Theme"	4:03

=== Romancing SaGa 2 Original Sound Version ===
Romancing SaGa 2 Original Sound Version

Soundtrack album by Kenji Ito
- Released: December 3, 1993; November 25, 1995; October 1, 2004
- Genre: Video game soundtrack
- Length: 1:12:29
- Labels: Square; NTT Publishing (re-releases)

Romancing SaGa 2 Original Sound Version is a soundtrack album for Romancing SaGa 2. It was composed by Kenji Ito, with the exception of two tracks, "The Legend Begins" and "Heartful Tears", which were composed by Nobuo Uematsu and arranged by Ito. The album covers 35 tracks and has a duration of 1:12:29. It was first published by Square on December 3, 1993, with the catalog number N25D-022, and reprinted by NTT Publishing on November 25, 1995, with the number PSCN-5038 and on October 1, 2004, with the number NTCP-5038. The first 30 tracks come from the game, while the next four tracks are bonus dance music tracks and the final track is a different version of the game's prologue theme.

The soundtrack was warmly received by reviewers such as Patrick Gann, who said that "while no track on here is amazing, [...] they are all at least fairly good". He also enjoyed the "medieval/renaissance" feeling of the tracks, as well as the relative scarcity of "character themes" compared to the soundtracks of Romancing SaGa 1 and 3.

Track list
No.	Title	Japanese title	Length
1.	"Prologue -Legend of the Seven Heroes-"	プロローグ-七英雄の伝説-	6:38
2.	"Opening Title"	オープニングタイトル	2:26
3.	"Poem of a Battle Long Ago"	遥かなる戦いの詩	0:53
4.	"Imperial Capital Avalon"	帝都アバロン	1:35
5.	"Dungeon 1"	ダンジョン1	2:06
6.	"Disaster -The Death of Victor-"	異変-ヴィクトールの死-	2:18
7.	"The Emperor Goes to War"	皇帝出陣	2:31
8.	"Battle With Kujinshi"	クジンシーとの戦い	1:45
9.	"Victory!"	勝利!	0:46
10.	"Canal Fort"	運河要塞	1:49
11.	"Village 1"	村1	1:22
12.	"Pit of the Dragon"	竜の穴	1:46
13.	"Town in a Foreign Country"	異国の街	2:17
14.	"Voyage"	船旅	1:21
15.	"Legend of the Mermaid"	人魚の伝説	1:23
16.	"Sunken Ship"	沈没船	1:54
17.	"Dungeon 2"	ダンジョン2	1:10
18.	"Village 2"	村2	2:10
19.	"Escape!"	脱出!	0:48
20.	"Ancient Ruins"	古代遺跡	2:05
21.	"The Legend Begins"	伝説は始まる	1:28
22.	"Dungeon 3"	ダンジョン3	2:06
23.	"Seven Heroes Battle"	七英雄バトル	2:53
24.	"Annihilation Theme"	全滅のテーマ	1:45
25.	"Wipe Your Tears Away"	涙を拭いて	2:53
26.	"Last Dungeon"	ラストダンジョン	2:03
27.	"Last Battle"	ラストバトル	3:22
28.	"Ending Theme"	エンディングテーマ	8:13
29.	"Successive Emperors"	歴代皇帝	1:31
30.	"Epilogue"	エピローグ	3:19
31.	"#1"	#1	0:12
32.	"#2"	#2	0:18
33.	"#3"	#3	0:37
34.	"#4"	#4	0:21
35.	"Prologue -Legend of the Seven Heroes- (Original Version)"	〈ボーナストラック〉 プロローグ-七英雄の伝説-	2:28

=== Eternal Romance ===
Romancing SaGa 2 Eternal Romance

Soundtrack album by Ryou Fukui, Kenji Ito
- Released: February 21, 1994; November 25, 1995; October 1, 2004
- Genre: Video game soundtrack
- Length: 58:17
- Label: NTT Publishing

Romancing SaGa 2 Eternal Romance is an album of arrangements of music from the Romancing SaGa 2 soundtrack. The album's 10 tracks were arranged by Ryou Fukui, and were originally composed by Kenji Ito. The soundtrack has a length of 58:17 and was published by NTT Publishing three times: on February 21, 1994, with a catalog number of N30D-025, on November 25, 1995, with the number PSCN-5039, and on October 1, 2004, as NTCP-5039.

The album was appreciated by reviewers such as Dave of Square Enix Music Online, who called it "definitely worth listening to" and applauded the wide variety of instruments as well as the "thought" that went into the tracks. Patrick Gann, on the other hand, said that he felt confused while listening to the album, saying that while it was "interesting, even entertaining", he felt that he was "on the outside of an inside joke" and that only fans of Ito's music would appreciate the album.

Track list
No.	Title	Original track	Length
1.	"Preface to the Saga ~Prologue~" (プレフェス・トゥ・ザ・サガ〜プロローグ)	"Opening Title"	6:40
2.	"Colors" (カラーズ)	"Village 2"	5:27
3.	"Aspirants" (アスパイレンツ)	"Pit of the Dragon"	5:26
4.	"Mermaid Tears" (マーメイド・ティアーズ)	"Legend of the Mermaid"	6:21
5.	"Nereid Song" (ネレイド・ソング)	"Voyage"	5:26
6.	"Myriad Mystique" (ミリアド・ミスティーク)	"Ancient Ruins"	6:37
7.	"Exotic Dusk" (エキゾティック・ダスク)	"Town in a Foreign Country"	6:01
8.	"Bitter Prophecy" (ビター・プロフェシー)	"Disaster -The Death of Victor-"	6:00
9.	"Embracing You in My Arms" (インブレイシング・ユー・イン・マイ・アームズ)	"Dungeon 3"	4:00
10.	"Preciousness ~Epilogue~" (プレシャスネス〜エピローグ)	"Epilogue"	6:19

=== Romancing SaGa 3 Original Sound Version ===
Romancing SaGa 3 Original Sound Version

Soundtrack album by Kenji Ito
- Released: November 25, 1995; October 1, 2004
- Genre: Video game soundtrack
- Length: 2:29:19
- Label: NTT Publishing

Romancing SaGa 3 Original Sound Version is a soundtrack album for Romancing SaGa 3. It was entirely composed by Kenji Ito. The album covers 70 tracks over three discs and has a duration of 2:29:19. It was first published by NTT Publishing on November 25, 1995, with the catalog numbers PSCN-5033~5, and reprinted by NTT Publishing on October 1, 2004, with the numbers NTCP-5033~5.

The album was well received by Patrick Gann, who termed it "above expectations" and "some of Ito's finest work". He highlighted the third disc and the character themes as the best tracks on the album.

Track list

Disc 1
No.	Title	Japanese title	Length
1.	"Prologue ~Threat of the Death Eclipse~"	プロローグ〜死食の脅威	1:41
2.	"Opening Title"	オープニングタイトル	2:10
3.	"Julian's Theme"	ユリアンのテーマ	2:15
4.	"Ellen's Theme"	エレンのテーマ	2:07
5.	"Sara's Theme"	サラのテーマ	2:57
6.	"Thomas' Theme"	トーマスのテーマ	3:00
7.	"Harrid's Theme"	ハリードのテーマ	2:30
8.	"Michael's Theme"	ミカエルのテーマ	2:03
9.	"Monica's Theme"	モニカのテーマ	2:53
10.	"Katarina's Theme"	カタリナのテーマ	1:48
11.	"Field"	フィールド	3:15
12.	"Battle 1"	バトル1	3:46
13.	"Victory!"	勝利!	0:48
14.	"Podorui"	ボドールイ	2:30
15.	"Dungeon 1"	ダンジョン1	1:54
16.	"Battle 2"	バトル2	1:53
17.	"Congratulatory March"	祝福マーチ	1:53
18.	"Departure"	出航	1:28
19.	"Muse's Theme"	ミューズのテーマ	2:55
20.	"Dungeon 2"	ダンジョン2	1:48
21.	"The Professor's Love Theme"	きょ・う・じゅ・のテーマ	0:41
22.	"Pet-capture Epic Battle"	ペット捕獲大作戦	1:27
23.	"Voyage"	船旅	2:13

Disc 2
No.	Title	Japanese title	Length
1.	"Town of the Holy King, Lance"	聖王の町ランス	2:36
2.	"Holy King Temple"	聖王廟	2:04
3.	"Magical Tank Battle"	術戦車バトル	2:51
4.	"Great Arch"	グレートアーチ	1:45
5.	"Jungle"	ジャングル	1:02
6.	"Fairy Village"	妖精の村	1:55
7.	"Nightmare"	夢魔	2:35
8.	"Dophore's Evil Deeds"	ドフォーレの悪行	0:34
9.	"Superhero Robin's Theme ~Evil Never Prevails!~"	怪傑ロビンのテーマ〜この世に悪はさかえない!	2:50
10.	"Awakening"	目覚め	1:25
11.	"Vanguard Take Off!"	バンガード発進!	2:07
12.	"Island at the Edge of the World"	最果ての島	1:18
13.	"Desert"	砂漠	2:05
14.	"Crystal Ruins"	水晶の廃墟	2:53
15.	"Eastern Country"	東の国	1:59
16.	"Capital of Kings"	諸王の都	1:51
17.	"Rashkuta"	ラシュクータ	2:24
18.	"Holy King Tower"	神王の塔	2:47
19.	"Trade"	トレード	2:10
20.	"Aurora"	オーロラ	1:43
21.	"Snowman Town"	雪だるまの町	1:53
22.	"Ice Lake"	氷湖	1:48
23.	"Gwen's Den"	グゥエインの巣	2:02
24.	"Leonid's Castle"	レオニード城	2:40

Disc 3
No.	Title	Japanese title	Length
1.	"Demon King Palace"	魔王殿	2:07
2.	"Demon King Palace Underground"	魔王殿地下	2:12
3.	"Byunei's Den"	ビューネイの巣	2:26
4.	"Fire Fortress"	火術要塞	1:31
5.	"Underwater Palace"	海底宮	2:43
6.	"Imminent Crisis"	迫り来る危機	1:11
7.	"Four-aristocrat Demons Battle 1"	四魔貴族バトル1	3:01
8.	"Theme of Annihilation"	全滅のテーマ	1:45
9.	"Theme of Sadness 1"	悲しみのテーマ1	1:47
10.	"Theme of Sadness 2"	同2	2:58
11.	"To the Battlefield..."	いざ戦場へ...	2:02
12.	"Occult Castle Battle"	玄城バトル	2:19
13.	"Last Dungeon"	ラストダンジョン	2:19
14.	"Four-aristocrat Demons Battle 2"	四魔貴族バトル2	3:41
15.	"Abyss Gate"	アビスゲート	2:07
16.	"Last Battle"	ラストバトル	4:50
17.	"Epilogue ~To a New Journey~"	エピローグ〜新たな旅へ	5:40
18.	"End Title"	エンドタイトル	4:08
19.	"Fanfare"	ファンファーレ	0:10
20.	"Putting Up for the Night"	宿屋で一泊	0:13
21.	"Trade ~Counterattack~"	トレード〜逆襲	0:05
22.	"Trade ~Defeat~"	同〜敗北	0:06
23.	"The Professor's Love Theme (Original Version)"	きょ・う・じゅ・のテーマ(オリジナル・ヴァージョン)	0:40

=== Windy Tale ===
Romancing SaGa 3 Windy Tale

Soundtrack album by Taro Iwashiro, Kenji Ito
- Released: January 25, 1996; October 1, 2004
- Genre: Video game soundtrack
- Length: 45:47
- Label: NTT Publishing

Romancing SaGa 3 Windy Tale is an arranged album of music from Romancing SaGa 3. The pieces were arranged by Taro Iwashiro from tracks composed by Kenji Ito. The album's 10 tracks cover a duration of 45:47. It was first published by NTT Publishing on January 25, 1996, with the catalog number PSCN-5043, and reprinted by NTT Publishing on October 1, 2004, with the number NTCP-5043.

The album was well received by critics such as Eric Farand of RPGFan, who appreciated the slower feel of the album which in his opinion allowed it to focus on "delivering beautiful melodies" and made it "a pleasure to listen to". Dave of Square Enix Music Online agreed, saying it took the original soundtrack and "improve[d] an already good album". In his opinion, each track was "masterfully composed" and the album was "diverse" in genres.

Track list
No.	Title	Original track	Length
1.	"Overture"	Overture	2:41
2.	"Start of Dream"	夢のはじまり	6:06
3.	"In the Gentle Rocking Breeze"	そよ風にゆられて	4:53
4.	"Lost Memories"	Lost Memories	4:57
5.	"A Shy Smile"	微笑みにつつまれて	3:14
6.	"Two Hearts"	Two Hearts	4:21
7.	"Fairy's Whisper"	Fairy's Whisper	3:26
8.	"Tears"	Tears	5:07
9.	"Stardust Waltz"	Stardust Waltz	3:37
10.	"Windy Tale ~Teaching Wind~"	Windy Tale 〜風が教えてくれたこと〜	7:25

=== Prologue ===
Romancing SaGa 3 Prologue

Soundtrack album by Kenji Ito
- Released: November 11, 1995
- Genre: Video game soundtrack
- Length: 18:40
- Label: NTT Publishing

Romancing SaGa 3 Prologue is a promotional album of music from Romancing SaGa 3. The tunes were composed by Kenji Ito. The album contains the character themes from the game, and was included in an identically titled book detailing the game's story, characters and artwork. The album's eight tracks cover a duration of 18:40. It was published by NTT Publishing on November 11, 1995, with the catalog number RSS-0001.

Track list
No.	Title	Length
1.	"Theme of Julian"	2:06
2.	"Theme of Elen"	2:02
3.	"Theme of Sarah"	2:51
4.	"Theme of Thomas"	2:56
5.	"Theme of Harid"	2:22
6.	"Theme of Michael"	1:56
7.	"Theme of Monica"	2:46
8.	"Theme of Katharina"	1:41

=== Romancing SaGa Minstrel Song Original Soundtrack ===
Romancing SaGa Minstrel Song Original Soundtrack

Soundtrack album by Kenji Ito, Tsuyoshi Sekito
- Released: April 27, 2005
- Genre: Video game soundtrack
- Length: 3:47:32
- Label: Universal Music

Romancing SaGa Minstrel Song Original Soundtrack is an arranged album of music from Romancing SaGa Minstrel Song, the 2005 enhanced remake of Romancing SaGa. The tracks were primarily composed by Kenji Ito, with one track contributed by Tsuyoshi Sekito and one track contributed by Nobuo Uematsu, and were arranged from those compositions by Ito and Sekito. When Ito arranged the music of Romancing SaGa 1 for Minstrel Song, he felt that because of all of the fans who had played the original game and the change in audio hardware from the Super Famicom to the PlayStation 2 he did not want to simply re-arrange the pieces, but instead tried to "re-make" the soundtrack into something which could stand on its own from the original soundtrack and the game. He spent two years completing the remake. The game's theme song, "Minuet", is sung by Masayoshi Yamazaki. The album's 103 tracks cover a duration of 3:47:32 across four discs. It was published by Universal Music on April 27, 2005, with the catalog numbers UPCH-1411~4. The release of the Romancing SaGa Minstrel Song Remastered Original Soundtrack on December 07, 2022 includes three additional songs on Disc 4.

The album was well received by critics such as Derek Strange of RPGFan, who described it as a "must-have soundtrack" and complimented Ito in both arranging tracks from Romancing SaGa "to both sterling and awesome heights" and in composing new tracks that blended well with the older ones. Chris Greening of Square Enix Music Online agreed, saying that it exceeded expectations and was Ito's "finest work to date". Both reviewers cited the fourth disc as the weakest, with Chris referring to it as "mostly filler tracks".

Track list

Disc 1
No.	Title	Japanese title	Length
1.	"Minuet (Minstrel Song Edit)"	メヌエット(Minstrel Song Edit)	3:20
2.	"Overture"	オーバーチュア	1:48
3.	"Title Screen"	オープニングタイトル	2:17
4.	"Albert - Wings of Justice"	正義の希望 -Albert-	2:09
5.	"Aisha - The Wind's Kiss"	風を感じて -Aisha-	2:22
6.	"Jamil - All the World is an Oyster"	お宝はすべてイタダキさ! -Jamil-	2:05
7.	"Claudia - Innocent Warden"	無垢なる守り人 -Claudia-	3:09
8.	"Hawk - Leaning on Lady Luck"	我が戦友、レイディラック -Hawk-	2:10
9.	"Sif - Valor Unyielding"	果断なる勇 -Sif-	2:46
10.	"Gray - Arrant Freedom"	絶対自由 -Gray-	2:59
11.	"Barbara - Passion in a Glance, Passion in a Dance"	情熱の瞳、魅惑の舞 -Barbara-	2:20
12.	"Neidhart's Theme"	ナイトハルトのテーマ	2:53
13.	"Halls of Illusion"	幻想迷宮	2:57
14.	"A Prelude to Bloodshed"	戦いの序曲	2:22
15.	"Victory!"	勝利!	0:51
16.	"Assault on Isthmus Keep"	イスマス城襲撃	0:47
17.	"Shuttered Heart"	閉じられた心	2:18
18.	"Palace Theme"	宮殿のテーマ	2:32
19.	"The Soul of Fire"	The Soul Of Fire	2:30
20.	"A Knight's Pride"	騎士の誇り	4:00
21.	"Nameday"	称号獲得	0:20
22.	"The Crystal City"	クリスタルシティ	2:49
23.	"Feeling Jazzy"	Jazzyな気分で	2:31

Disc 2
No.	Title	Japanese title	Length
1.	"Minstrel Song"	Minstrel Song	1:56
2.	"Sleep Tight"	おやすみなさい	0:09
3.	"Darkness Beckons"	闇への誘い	2:27
4.	"Ardent Rhythm"	熱情の律動	2:49
5.	"Mazewood"	迷いの森	4:33
6.	"Sea Voyage"	船旅	2:35
7.	"Enough!"	おまえらカンベンしてください!	2:00
8.	"Pirates"	俺たちゃ海賊	1:41
9.	"The Sewers"	下水道	2:54
10.	"Isle of Evil"	魔の島	2:36
11.	"Chaos Labyrinth"	Chaos Labyrinth	2:36
12.	"Escape!"	脱出!	0:51
13.	"Impenetrable Domain"	不可侵領域 -四天王ダンジョン-	3:38
14.	"Divine Provocation"	神々への挑戦 -四天王バトル-	3:47
15.	"Requiem"	レクイエム	0:14
16.	"Crestfallen Maiden"	傷心のアイシャ	2:45
17.	"Solitude"	孤独のテーマ	2:57
18.	"Undying Pain"	消せない痛み	2:27
19.	"A Piece of Courage"	A Piece Of Courage	2:43
20.	"Happiness Tears"	Tears of Happiness	2:54
21.	"The Land of Giants"	巨人の里	2:53
22.	"Melodies of Good and Evil"	邪聖の旋律	3:20
23.	"Wipe Away Your Tears"	涙を拭いて	2:29
24.	"More Pirates!"	おれたちゃ海賊	1:45

Disc 3
No.	Title	Japanese title	Length
1.	"The Ultimate Trial"	最終試練	3:19
2.	"Believing My Justice"	Believing My Justice	3:43
3.	"Mysterious Glitter"	Mysterious Glitter	4:26
4.	"Memories Stirred - The Battle with Sherah"	呼び醒まされた記憶 -The Battle With Sherah-	5:21
5.	"Inferno"	冥府	3:06
6.	"Oblivion Calling - The Battle with Death"	死への招待状 -The Battle With Death-	4:05
7.	"The Last Dungeon"	ラストダンジョン	2:09
8.	"Advent Darkness"	邪神復活	1:39
9.	"Resurrection"	復活の舞台へ	3:28
10.	"Saruin Unchained - The Final Battle"	決戦! サルーイン -Final Battle With Saruin-	6:27
11.	"A Single Plea"	たったひとつの願い	4:47
12.	"Everlasting Emotion"	永久なる想い	2:49
13.	"Ending Theme"	エンドタイトル	4:38
14.	"Minuet (Ending Edit)"	メヌエット(Ending Edit)	2:55

Disc 4
No.	Title	Japanese title	Length
1.	"A Window to Rosaria"	ローザリアの窓辺から	2:40
2.	"A Window to the Knights' Dominion"	騎士団領の窓辺から	2:43
3.	"A Window to the Frontier"	フロンティアの窓辺から	2:14
4.	"A Window to Walon Isle"	ワロン島の窓辺から	1:53
5.	"A Window to Ligau Isle"	リガウ島の窓辺から	2:39
6.	"A Window to the Steppes of Galessa"	ガレサステップの窓辺から	2:26
7.	"A Window to Valhalland"	バルハラントの窓辺から	1:57
8.	"A Window to Kjaraht"	クジャラートの窓辺から	1:37
9.	"A Window to the Mines"	鉱山の窓辺から	1:48
10.	"A Window to the Sea"	海の見える窓辺から	1:50
11.	"A Window to the Bafal Empire"	バファル帝国の窓辺から	2:29
12.	"A Window to an Oasis"	オアシスの窓辺から	2:10
13.	"A Window to a Fishing Village"	漁村の窓辺から	1:57
14.	"Disquiet"	不安	1:12
15.	"Shock & Awe"	衝撃	1:18
16.	"Pathos"	悲愴	1:19
17.	"No Problem"	無問題	0:42
18.	"Do the Charleston!?"	いきなりチャールストン!?	0:42
19.	"A Sign"	予兆	1:11
20.	"Pressure"	プレッシャー	1:25
21.	"Scuttering and Scampering"	疾走	1:14
22.	"Invisible"	不可視	0:46
23.	"A Fair Amount of Romancing"	それなりにロマンシング	1:16
24.	"Lazy Days"	退屈な日々	1:05
25.	"Human Nature"	生けるものの性	1:43
26.	"Terminus"	終焉	1:34
27.	"Single A"	ジングルA	0:09
28.	"Single B"	ジングルB	0:11
29.	"Wisdom"	深遠	1:18
30.	"Shivers"	悪寒	1:26
31.	"Anticipation"	期待	1:08
32.	"Strange Bedfellows"	おかしな二人	0:23
33.	"Confusion"	困惑	1:03
34.	"Crisis"	危機	0:34
35.	"Jeopardy"	進撃	1:00
36.	"Resolve"	決意	1:22
37.	"Final Parting"	永遠の別れ	1:05
38.	"Fateful Encounter"	運命の出会い	0:52
39.	"Silent Footfalls"	抜足! 差足!! 忍足!!!	0:42
40.	"Lure of the Flamenco"	フラメンコに誘われて	0:41
41.	"Across the Deep"	大海原を駆けろ!	1:09
42.	"Everlasting Emotion (Piano Solo Version)"	永久なる想い(Piano Solo Version)	3:42
43.	"Pirates! (Inst ver.)" (Remastered Soundtrack Addition)	俺たちゃ海賊(Inst ver.)	0:58
44.	"Pirates! (Sudden ver.)" (Remastered Soundtrack Addition)	俺たちゃ海賊(Sudden ver.)	0:35
45.	"Melodies of Good and Evil (More Wicked!)" (Remastered Soundtrack Addition)	邪聖の旋律(More Wicked!)	4:06

=== Minuet ===
Romancing SaGa Minstrel Song: Minuet is the single for "Minuet", the theme song of Romancing SaGa Minstrel Song. The song was written, composed, and sung by Masayoshi Yamazaki. The album contains the original song, an acoustic version, and a karaoke version, all performed by Yamazaki. The album's 3 tracks cover a duration of 14:18. It was published by Universal Music on April 13, 2005, with the catalog number UPCH-5303, and also as a limited-edition version with the catalog number of UPCH-9176, and included a screensaver and wallpapers for a computer.

Like the soundtrack it was featured on, Minuet was well received by critics. Patrick Gann called it "strangely beautiful", and described the genre as either "pop or neo-renaissance". He said that the acoustic version was his favorite version of the song on the album. Totz of Square Enix Music Online called it "a CD with one incredibly wonderful song", but stated that he wished there were more works by Yamazaki on the album than just the one song. He concluded that while the album was definitely "worth it" from a "musical perspective", but might not be from a "buyer's perspective".

Track list
No.	Title	Length
1.	"Minuet"	4:46
2.	"Minuet (acoustic version)"	4:46
3.	"Minuet (original karaoke)"	4:46

== SaGa Frontier ==
The SaGa Frontier subseries consists of SaGa Frontier, a 1997 PlayStation game, and SaGa Frontier 2, released on the PlayStation in 1999. SaGa Frontier was composed by Kenji Ito, the last SaGa game he has worked on besides the remake of Romancing SaGa 1, while SaGa Frontier 2 saw the first work in the series by Masashi Hamauzu. The series has sparked three albums, which are the soundtrack albums to the two games and a collection of piano and orchestral arrangements of music from SaGa Frontier 2. SaGa Frontier 2 was the first soundtrack from the SaGa series that Ito was not a composer for since SaGa 3 nine years prior and the second solo project by Hamauzu after Chocobo's Mysterious Dungeon. Hamauzu has stated that his intention for the soundtrack was to "compose outside the field of conventional 'game music'," and that to do this he "took a lot of chances in every possible way". In the liner notes for the soundtrack album, Hamauzu explained that when he began the project he felt pressured to compose music in the same vein as the previous soundtracks in the series, but in the final months before finishing he decided to abandon any preconceived notions of what the music should sound like and instead to "express [his] own unique character".

=== SaGa Frontier Original Soundtrack ===
SaGa Frontier Original Soundtrack

Soundtrack album by Kenji Ito
- Released: July 21, 1997; February 1, 2006
- Recorded: Sunrise Studio
- Genre: Video game soundtrack
- Length: 3:33:41
- Labels: DigiCube; Square Enix (re-release)

SaGa Frontier Original Soundtrack is an album of music from SaGa Frontier, composed by Kenji Ito. The album's 75 tracks cover a duration of 3:33:41 across three discs. The third disc contains a hidden track, track 0, which can be found be rewinding the album back from track 1. The album was published by DigiCube on July 21, 1997, with the catalog number SSCX-10009, and re-released by Square Enix on February 1, 2006, with the catalog numbers SQEX-10058~60.

The album reached #69 on the Japan Oricon charts. It was well received by critics such as RPGFan, which said that almost every track was "excellent" and complimented Ito on combining melodies and styles from his Romancing SaGa soundtracks with new styles to form a unique Frontier sound. Ashley Winchester of Square Enix Music Online was more hesitant, saying that while the score had a "lighthearted and easy listening quality" that made it "easy to digest", it was also lacking any "real innovation" and its arrangements were "somewhat simpler" than expected.

Track list

Disc 1
No.	Title	Japanese title	Length
1.	"The Opening of a Journey"	旅の幕あけ	1:54
2.	"Opening Title"	オープニングタイトル	2:26
3.	"Theme of Blue"	ブルーのテーマ	2:13
4.	"Margmel in Ruin"	滅びゆくマーグメル	2:25
5.	"Standard Yorkland Song"	正調・ヨークランド節	2:34
6.	"Junk"	ボロ	2:41
7.	"Fight! Alkaiser"	戦え! アルカイザー	2:47
8.	"Theme of Emelia"	エミリアのテーマ	2:36
9.	"Theme of Asellus"	アセルスのテーマ	3:14
10.	"Trick"	まよい	2:16
11.	"Dungeon #1"	Dungeon #1	2:48
12.	"Battle #1"	Battle #1	2:26
13.	"Victory!"	勝利!	0:46
14.	"To the New Land"	新天地へ	1:19
15.	"Sunset Town"	Sunset Town	2:17
16.	"Let's Swing!"	Let's Swing!	1:46
17.	"Zap! Caballero Family"	対決! カバレロー家	1:53
18.	"Ancient Tomb of Sei"	済王陵古墳	2:10
19.	"Ancient Tomb of Mu"	武王古墳	2:50
20.	"Battle #2"	Battle #2	2:01
21.	"Nakajima Manufacturer"	中島製作所	1:41
22.	"Fighting Machine Arena"	闘機場	2:54
23.	"Leonard's Laboratory"	レオナルド・ラボラトリー	2:35
24.	"Theme of the Cygnus"	キグナスのテーマ	3:09
25.	"Baccarat"	バカラ	2:07
26.	"Devin"	ドゥヴァン	1:50
27.	"Koorong"	九龍	2:17
28.	"Battle #3"	Battle #3	2:49
29.	"Wipeout"	全滅...	0:25
30.	"N·E·X·T"	N·E·X·T	0:12

Disc 2
No.	Title	Japanese title	Length
1.	"A Blue Town"	碧い街	2:26
2.	"Omble"	オーンブル	1:54
3.	"The Ancient Ship"	古代シップ	2:12
4.	"Despair"	ディスペア	2:51
5.	"HQ"	HQ	2:44
6.	"Booby Trap"	Booby Trap	2:14
7.	"Hey! FUSE"	Hey! FUSE	2:08
8.	"Shudder"	戦慄	3:51
9.	"Owmi"	オウミ	3:40
10.	"Shingrow"	シンロウ	3:03
11.	"Theme of Kylin"	麒麟のテーマ	2:43
12.	"Shuzer"	シュウザー	2:41
13.	"Danger!"	危険!	1:04
14.	"Battle #4"	Battle #4	3:27
15.	"Back Street of Koorong"	Back Street of 九龍	2:47
16.	"ALONE"	ALONE	5:05
17.	"Melody of Time"	時の調べ	3:10
18.	"With Orlouge"	オルロワージュのもとに	3:03
19.	"Castle of Needles"	針の城	2:55
20.	"Labyrinth of Darkness"	闇の迷宮	2:21
21.	"Magic Kingdom"	マジックキングダム	4:08
22.	"Battle #5"	Battle #5	3:21
23.	"Melody -A Tune-"	旋律 -調べ-	4:05
24.	"Resolution"	Resolution	3:01

Disc 3
No.	Title	Japanese title	Length
0.	"Theme of Coon (Hidden Track)"	Theme of Coon (Hidden Track)	2:12
1.	"Mosperiburg"	ムスペルニブル	3:11
2.	"Wakatu"	ワカツ	3:27
3.	"Black X Base"	ブラッククロス基地	2:14
4.	"Hell"	地獄	4:05
5.	"The Ultimate Weapon"	最終兵器	3:21
6.	"Never..."	絶対...	3:30
7.	"Last Battle -Asellus-"	Last Battle -Asellus-	3:20
8.	"Last Battle -Blue-"	Last Battle -Blue-	3:35
9.	"Last Battle -Coon-"	Last Battle -Coon-	4:15
10.	"Last Battle -Red-"	Last Battle -Red-	3:50
11.	"Last Battle -T260G-"	Last Battle -T260G-	4:29
12.	"Last Battle -Lute-"	Last Battle -Lute-	5:47
13.	"Last Battle -Emelia-"	Last Battle -Emelia-	4:55
14.	"Lamox Beat (Ending -Coon-)"	ラモックス・ビート (Ending -Coon-)	1:48
15.	"Destiny -A Law- (Ending -Blue-)"	運命 -さだめ- (Ending -Blue-)	3:35
16.	"Dear My Country (Ending -Lute-)"	Dear My Country (Ending -Lute-)	2:04
17.	"Fight! R3X!! (Ending -Red-)"	FIGHT! R3X!! (Ending -Red-)	1:04
18.	"Like a Revolving Lantern... (Ending -Asellus-)"	走馬灯のごとく... (Ending -Asellus-)	5:17
19.	"Contented (Ending -Emelia-)"	みちみたりて (Ending -Emelia-)	3:13
20.	"A Memory of Childhood (Ending -T260G-)"	少年の日の想い出 (Ending -T260G-)	8:15

=== SaGa Frontier II Original Soundtrack ===
SaGa Frontier II Original Soundtrack

Soundtrack album by Masashi Hamauzu
- Released: April 21, 1999; February 1, 2006
- Recorded: Sunrise Studio
- Genre: Video game soundtrack
- Length: 3:05:14
- Labels: DigiCube; Square Enix (re-release)

SaGa Frontier II Original Soundtrack is an album of music from SaGa Frontier. The tracks were composed by Masashi Hamauzu. The album's 76 tracks cover a duration of 3:05:14 across three discs. The album was published by DigiCube on April 21, 1999, with the catalog number SSCX-10031, and re-released by Square Enix on February 1, 2006, with the catalog numbers SQEX-10061~3.

The album reached #88 on the Japan Oricon charts. It was well received by critics such as Patrick Gann, who described Hamauzu's inaugural work on the series as "different, but also extremely well-done". He said that the individual tracks were "darn good" and applauded the innovative synthesizer techniques used. Nathan Black of Square Enix Music Online also highly praised the album, calling it "excellent" and saying that it "amazed him". Terming the soundtrack Hamauzu's "first major work", he ascribed the album's quality to Hamauzu wanting to "take chances" and make a name for himself. He concluded that because of this there was nothing "bland", "boring" or "predictable" about the soundtrack.

Track list

Disc 1
No.	Title	Original title	Length
1.	"Overture"	"Vorspiel"	1:23
2.	"Prelude"	"Präludium"	1:35
3.	"Outside World"	"Außenwelt"	1:59
4.	"Novel"	"Roman"	1:43
5.	"Majesty"	"Majestät"	2:40
6.	"Rose Wreath"	"Rosenkranz"	1:56
7.	"Marvel"	"Wunderding"	1:58
8.	"Field Battle I"	"Feldschlacht I"	2:59
9.	"Showing Joy I"	"Freudenbezeigung I"	1:17
10.	"Nature Folk"	"Naturvolk"	2:01
11.	"Captain"	"Hauptmann"	2:24
12.	"Siren"	"Wasserjungfer"	1:59
13.	"Affliction"	"Trübsal"	1:51
14.	"Deviation"	"Abweichung"	1:56
15.	"Defiant Child"	"Trotzkopf"	2:19
16.	"Elven King"	"Erlkönig"	2:10
17.	"Homeless One"	"Heimatlose"	1:57
18.	"Secrecy"	"Verborgenheit"	1:59
19.	"Meditation"	"Vergeistigung"	1:44
20.	"Gathering"	"Zusammentreffen"	2:05
21.	"Disorder"	"Durcheinander"	1:59
22.	"Underground"	"Untergrund"	1:57
23.	"Luck of the Battle"	"Schlachtenglück"	2:03
24.	"Obsession"	"Besessenheit"	2:29
25.	"Theme"	"Thema"	2:42
26.	"Disgrace"	"Schmach"	3:10
27.	"Manifesto"	"Manifest"	1:48
28.	"The Sacred"	"Weihaltor"	1:55

Disc 2
No.	Title	Original title	Length
1.	"Variation"	"Variation"	3:00
2.	"Magic Fairy Tale"	"Zaubermärchen"	2:49
3.	"Depth"	"Tiefe"	2:20
4.	"Dithyrambus"	"Dithyrambus"	2:53
5.	"Magic Realm"	"Zauberreich"	2:09
6.	"Relevation"	"Relevation"	1:49
7.	"Open Air Music"	"Freiluftmusik"	2:46
8.	"Reminiscence"	"Reminiszenz"	2:41
9.	"Directive"	"Weisung"	1:54
10.	"Deadly Enemy"	"Todfeind"	2:16
11.	"Tobel"	"Tobel"	2:25
12.	"Room Composition"	"Raumkomposition"	1:40
13.	"Cure of Souls"	"Seelsorge"	2:19
14.	"Field Battle II"	"Feldschlacht II"	2:34
15.	"Showing Joy II"	"Freudenbezeigung II"	1:18
16.	"Panacea"	"Wundermittel"	2:43
17.	"Flashback"	"Rückerinnerung"	3:06
18.	"Stranger"	"Fremdling"	2:01
19.	"Conscious"	"Unmacht"	1:57
20.	"Message"	"Botshaft"	3:26
21.	"National Dance"	"Nationaltanz"	3:03
22.	"Success"	"Erfolg"	3:22
23.	"Question"	"Frage"	2:22
24.	"Disharmony"	"Disharmonie"	2:26
25.	"Elven Queen"	"Elfenkönigin"	2:49
26.	"Magic Power"	"Zauberkraft"	2:14
27.	"Nightingale"	"Nachtigall"	1:25

Disc 3
No.	Title	Original title	Length
1.	"Interlude"	"Interludium"	3:30
2.	"Blaze"	"Flamme"	2:33
3.	"Twisted Thinking"	"Andächtelei"	2:41
4.	"Field Battle III"	"Feldschlacht III"	3:43
5.	"Showing Joy III"	"Freudenbezeigung III"	1:16
6.	"Ice Chunks"	"Eisklumpen"	3:08
7.	"Arranger"	"Arrangeur"	2:52
8.	"Point"	"Pointe"	3:17
9.	"Fortress"	"Festung"	3:40
10.	"Ovation"	"Ovation"	2:34
11.	"Loneliness"	"Einsamkeit"	2:03
12.	"Universe"	"Weltall"	4:18
13.	"Coincidence"	"Zufall"	3:45
14.	"Field Battle IV"	"Feldschlacht IV"	3:28
15.	"Showing Joy IV"	"Freudenbezeigung IV"	1:19
16.	"Mania"	"Manie"	2:30
17.	"Leader of Battle"	"Schlachtenlenker"	4:05
18.	"Devotion"	"Andacht"	2:35
19.	"Abnormity"	"Mißgestalt"	2:31
20.	"Angel of Death"	"Todesengel"	5:46
21.	"Postlude"	"Postludium"	1:25

=== Piano Pieces "SF2" ~ Rhapsody on a Theme of SaGa Frontier 2 ===
Piano Pieces SF2 ~ Rhapsody on a Theme of SaGa Frontier 2

Soundtrack album by Masashi Hamauzu
- Released: July 7, 1999; July 21, 2010
- Recorded: Sound Inn Studio, Crescente Studio
- Genre: Video game soundtrack
- Length: 50:44/52:52
- Labels: DigiCube; Square Enix

Piano Pieces "SF2" ~ Rhapsody on a Theme of SaGa Frontier 2 is an arranged album of music from SaGa Frontier 2. The tracks were composed and arranged by Masashi Hamauzu and performed by Naoko Endo, Daisuke Hara, Mikiko Saiki, Daisuke Karasuda, and Michiko Minakata. The album's 24 tracks are broken up into groupings of tracks with the same name, with each group of tracks performed by a different person or group of people. Every grouping but the last consists of piano arrangements, while the last grouping, "Rhapsody on a Theme of SaGa Frontier 2", is a full orchestral arrangement. The album has a length of 50:44. It was published by DigiCube on July 7, 1999, with the catalog number SSCX-10033. The album included a booklet with the full score to all of the piano arrangements in the album. It was reprinted by Square Enix on July 21, 2010, with the catalog number SQEX-10197. This version of the album included an extra track number 25, a new version of "'β' 1", which extended the length of the album to 52:52.

The album was well received by critics such as Patrick Gann, who called it "amazing" and a "must-have". He felt that the "Rhapsody on a Theme" tracks were the best on the album. Aevloss of Square Enix Music Online said that each track was "of a consistently high standard" and that the album as a whole was better than the original soundtrack, which he held to be "very impressive". He singled out the variety of styles used in the album as particularly worthy of praise.

Track list
No.	Title	Music	Original track	Length
1.	""α" 1"	Mikiko Saiki	"Isolation"	2:12
2.	""α" 2"	Mikiko Saiki	"Tobel"	2:34
3.	""α" 3"	Naoko Endo	"Gathering"	1:53
4.	""α" 4"	Naoko Endo	"Underground"	1:46
5.	""β" 1"	Michiko Minakata	"Rosary"	2:24
6.	""β" 2"	Michiko Minakata	"Siren"	1:57
7.	""β" 3"	Michiko Minakata	"Reminiscence"	1:23
8.	""β" 4"	Michiko Minakata	"Variation"	2:53
9.	""β" 5"	Michiko Minakata	"Arranger"	2:26
10.	""γ" 1"	Naoko Endo, Mikiko Saiki	"Outside World"	2:44
11.	""γ" 2"	Naoko Endo, Mikiko Saiki	"Intermission"	1:39
12.	""γ +" 1"	Daisuke Hara, Daisuke Karasuda	"Coincidence"	2:02
13.	""γ +" 2"	Daisuke Hara, Daisuke Karasuda	"Homeless"	1:36
14.	""γ +" 3"	Daisuke Hara, Daisuke Karasuda	"Flashback"	2:22
15.	""+4" 1"	Daisuke Hara	"Ivory Queen"	1:36
16.	""+4" 2"	Daisuke Karasuda	"Depth"	2:18
17.	""+4" 3"	Daisuke Karasuda	"The Sacred"	3:25
18.	""+4" 4"	Daisuke Karasuda	"Ending"	1:35
19.	""Rhapsody on a Theme of SaGa FRONTIER 2" 1"		"Romance"	2:32
20.	""Rhapsody on a Theme of SaGa FRONTIER 2" 2"		"Outside World"	1:33
21.	""Rhapsody on a Theme of SaGa FRONTIER 2" 3"		(Original piece)	1:58
22.	""Rhapsody on a Theme of SaGa FRONTIER 2" 4"		"Leader of Battle"	2:11
23.	""Rhapsody on a Theme of SaGa FRONTIER 2" 5"		"Prelude"	1:52
24.	""Rhapsody on a Theme of SaGa FRONTIER 2" 6"		"Prologue"	1:42
25.	""β" 1: Botschaft"		"Rosary"	2:03

== Unlimited Saga ==
Unlimited Saga is the newest SaGa game, first published on the PlayStation 2 in 2002 and was composed for by Masashi Hamauzu; it has not yet received any sequels. Unlimited Saga has sparked two albums, a soundtrack album and a promotional single. In the liner notes for the soundtrack album, Hamauzu estimated that he had completed the tunes for the soundtrack at a rate of one per day. He also noted that the game was Square Enix's first "all streaming audio RPG", which meant that the composer and synthesizer operator could use live recordings of each instrument in the final composition rather than using approximations created in a synthesizer. Despite this, some tracks, including "Judy's Theme", use only synthesized sounds as the synthesizer demo created prior to recording a live version sounded so real as to not need to be re-recorded. Hamauzu said that the tracks that used live instruments almost exclusively were the ones that were "Latin" in style, such as "Anxiety towards a Wonder" and "Battle Theme IV". Hamauzu also stated that for the soundtrack he reused several older pieces, with the oldest being "Mysterious Plan" which had been composed 10 years prior, though he said that amount of work that needed to be done to update the pieces required more effort than if he had composed a new piece instead.

=== Unlimited Saga Original Soundtrack ===
Unlimited Saga Original Soundtrack

Soundtrack album by Masashi Hamauzu
- Released: January 22, 2003
- Recorded: Sound Inn Studio, Onkio Haus
- Genre: Video game soundtrack
- Length: 2:07:03
- Label: DigiCube

Unlimited Saga Original Soundtrack is an arranged album of music from Unlimited Saga. The tracks were composed by Masashi Hamauzu, with some tracks arranged for orchestral performance by Shiro Hamaguchi. Hamauzu described the major differences between this soundtrack and his previous works as being the result of changes in technology, which allowed him to include a wider variety of musical genres as well as "ample" acoustic instruments. He has said that his favorite tune from the soundtrack is "Soaring Wings", the theme song for the game, particularly given the short amount of time he had to compose the soundtrack. When Hamauzu thought to use a song in the soundtrack, he decided to cast Mio Kashiwabara as the singer, despite having only met her once at the Tokyo University of Art festival two years before and never working with her. Despite her having never sung a non-classical work before, he was very satisfied with how the song came out. The album's 58 tracks cover a duration of 2:07:03 across two discs. The final four tracks of the album are arrangements of other pieces on the soundtrack. It was published by DigiCube on January 22, 2003, with the catalog numbers SSCX-10078~9.

The album reached #115 on the Japan Oricon charts. It was well received by critics such as Jeff Tittsworth of RPGFan, who applauded its variety, saying that each track had a "distinct feel" even as the album as a whole felt "cohesive". He also noted that each disc had its own feel, with the first disc containing more mellow and emotional pieces, while the second held "harder" rock, techno and jazz pieces, a dichotomy that he felt strengthened the album as a whole. James McCawley of RPGFan agreed; while he preferred the sound of the second disc, he felt that together they created a stronger album which reflected "the split sides of Hamauzu's musical character". Chris Greening of Square Enix Music Online also enjoyed the album, calling it "an accomplished piece of experimentation that is also often satisfying on an emotional and melodic level", though he added a caveat that if the listener did not enjoy electronic music, they would find the album "often wonderful but also hugely inconsistent".

Track list

Disc 1
No.	Title	Original title	Length
1.	"UNLIMITED : SaGa Overture"	アンリミテッド:サガ序曲 ANRIMITEDDO:SAGA jokyoku	2:24
2.	"The Seven Travelers"	旅の七人 Tabi no shichinin	3:25
3.	"March in C"	March in C	2:32
4.	"Anxiety Towards a Wonder"	驚異への不安 Kyōi e no fuan	2:16
5.	"Judy's Theme"	ジュディのテーマ JUDI no TEEMA	1:40
6.	"Battle Theme I"	バトルテーマ I BATORU TEEMA I	2:07
7.	"Victory"	勝利 Shōri	1:17
8.	"Vent's Theme"	ヴェントのテーマ VENTO no TEEMA	1:44
9.	"Battle Theme II"	バトルテーマ II BATORU TEEMA II	2:33
10.	"Cash's Theme"	キャッシュのテーマ KYASSHU no TEEMA	2:08
11.	"Perpetual Motion"	恒久の動作 Kōkyū no dōsa	2:27
12.	"Battle Theme III"	バトルテーマ III BATORU TEEMA III	1:44
13.	"Armic's Theme"	アーミックのテーマ AAMIKKU no TEEMA	2:00
14.	"Enigmatic Scheme"	謎の計画 Nazo no keikaku	3:30
15.	"A Certain Story on a Hilltop"	ある丘の上のお話 Aru tsukasa no ue no ohanashi	0:39
16.	"Invasion"	襲来 Shūrai	0:57
17.	"Laura's Theme"	ローラのテーマ ROOSA no TEEMA	1:52
18.	"Battle Theme IV"	バトルテーマ IV BATORU TEEMA IV	1:37
19.	"Ruby's Theme"	ルビィのテーマ RUBII no TEEMA	2:22
20.	"The Sacred Starry Skies"	聖なる星空 Seinaru hoshizora	2:03
21.	"Shocking Space"	驚愕の空間 Kyōgaku no kūkan	2:06
22.	"Instant Relief"	ほっとする瞬間 Hotto suru shunkan	1:15
23.	"Solitude"	孤独 Kodoku	2:34
24.	"Myth's Theme"	マイスのテーマ MAISU no TEEMA	2:22
25.	"To the Great Aim"	大いなる目的へ Ooinaru mokuteki e	0:52
26.	"Pathetic"	悲愴 Hisō	2:04
27.	"Broken Desire"	打ち砕かれた希望 Uchikudakareta kibō	1:10
28.	"Iscandar"	イスカンダール ISUKANDAARU	1:02
29.	"J & A"	J&A	1:03
30.	"A & J"	A&J	1:02
31.	"Mysterious Flame"	神秘の炎 Shinpi no honoo	1:05
32.	"A Certain Story's End"	ある物語の終わり Aru monogatari no owari	0:18

Disc 2
No.	Title	Original title	Length
1.	"Space-Time Travels"	時空の旅 Jikū no tabi	3:55
2.	"DG "sine""	DG "sine"	2:21
3.	"Battle Theme EX"	バトルテーマ EX BATORU TEEMA EX	2:00
4.	"DG "listless""	DG "listless"	2:55
5.	"BT Ver.1"	BT Ver.1	1:49
6.	"BT Ver.2"	BT Ver.2	1:45
7.	"BT Ver.3"	BT Ver.3	1:49
8.	"DG "mixture""	DG "mixture"	3:34
9.	"BT Ver.4"	BT Ver.4	2:38
10.	"BT Ver.5"	BT Ver.5	1:35
11.	"BT Ver.AG"	BT Ver.AG	2:37
12.	"DG "comfort""	DG "comfort"	2:23
13.	"BT Ver.6"	BT Ver.6	2:20
14.	"DG "sadness""	DG "sadness"	3:32
15.	"BT Ver.7"	BT Ver.7	1:51
16.	"BT Ver.8"	BT Ver.8	1:51
17.	"A Challenge to the Seven Great Wonders"	七大驚異への挑戦 Shichinin kyōi e no chōsen	3:03
18.	"BT "ultimate""	BT "ultimate"	3:34
19.	"Release"	解放 Kaihō	2:03
20.	"FINALE"	フィナーレ FINAARE	2:04
21.	"Soaring Wings"	天翔ける翼 Amakakeru tsubasa	4:58
22.	"Return to the Main Subject!"	閑話休題 Kanwakyūdai	1:49
23.	"UNLIMITED : SaGa Overture 2ch Mix Ver."	アンリミテッド:サガ序曲 2ch Mix Ver. ANRIMITEDDO:SAGA jokyoku 2ch Mix Ver.	2:23
24.	"March in C 2ch Mix Ver."	March in C 2ch Mix Ver.	2:33
25.	"FINALE 2ch Mix Ver."	フィナーレ 2ch Mix Ver. FINAARE 2ch Mix. Ver.	2:04
26.	"Soaring Wings 2ch Mix Ver."	天翔ける翼 2ch Mix Ver. Amakakeru tsubasa 2ch Mix. Ver.	5:02

=== Unlimited Saga Maxi Single CD ===
Unlimited Saga Maxi Single CD is a promotional album of music from Unlimited Saga. All three tracks on the album were composed by Masashi Hamauzu, while "Unlimited SaGa Overture" was arranged for orchestra by Shiro Hamaguchi and "Soaring Wings" was sung by Mio Kashiwabara. The album contains a sampling of the tracks from the game. The album's three tracks cover a duration of 9:29. It was published by Square on December 12, 2002, with the catalog number SQCD-30001, and was included with the limited-edition version of the game in Japan.

The single was poorly received by Chris Greening of Square Enix Music Online, who said that while it worked well as a promotional album, it did not work as a stand-alone single after the release of the full soundtrack. He described it as "very limited" and "a pointless and thankfully obsolete album".

Track list
No.	Title	Japanese title	Length
1.	"UNLIMITED : SaGa Overture"	アンリミテッド:サガ序曲	2:24
2.	"Battle Theme I"	バトルテーマ I	2:07
3.	"Soaring Wings"	天翔ける翼	4:58

== Multiple series ==
Two albums have been or are planned to be produced that cover more than one SaGa series. The first, SaGa Battle Music Collection, is an album of battle music, while the second, the SaGa Series 20th Anniversary Original Soundtrack -Premium Box- is a box set of every soundtrack album produced to date from the SaGa series as a whole.

=== SaGa Battle Music Collection ===
SaGa Battle Music Collection

Compilation album by Kenji Ito
- Released: April 21, 2005
- Genre: Video game soundtrack
- Length: 46:39
- Label: Square Enix

SaGa Battle Music Collection is an album of battle music from across the SaGa series. The pieces were all composed by Kenji Ito; the album does not include any tracks originally composed by other series composers such as Hamauzu or Uematsu. The album's 14 tracks cover a duration of 46:39 and cover battle music from SaGa 2, Romancing SaGa 1, 2, and 3, SaGa Frontier, and Romancing SaGa Minstrel Song. The final two tracks of the album are piano solos by Ito, and are arrangements of themes common to the series as a whole. The album was produced as a promotional album for the release of Romancing SaGa Minstrel Song to be included with pre-orders of the Japanese release of the game, and was published by Square Enix on April 21, 2005, with the catalog number ROMA-0001. The album was well received by Patrick Gann, who said that it included some of Ito's most memorable tracks. He called it a "great idea" and said that it was "worth hunting down".

Track list
No.	Title	Japanese title	Length
1.	"Lethal Strike (Final Fantasy Legend II)"	必殺の一撃 (サ・ガ2秘宝伝説)	1:33
2.	"Battle 1 (Romancing SaGa)"	バトル1 (ロマンシング サ・ガ)	1:58
3.	"Battle 2 (Romancing SaGa)"	バトル2 (ロマンシング サ・ガ)	2:16
4.	"The Seven Heroes' Battle (Romancing SaGa 2)"	七英雄バトル (ロマンシング サ・ガ2)	2:53
5.	"Last Battle (Romancing SaGa 2)"	ラストバトル (ロマンシング サ・ガ2)	3:21
6.	"Four Demon Nobles Battle 1 (Romancing SaGa 3)"	四魔貴族バトル1 (ロマンシング サ・ガ3)	3:00
7.	"Four Demon Nobles Battle 2 (Romancing SaGa 3)"	四魔貴族バトル2 (ロマンシング サ・ガ3)	3:40
8.	"Last Battle (Romancing SaGa 3)"	ラストバトル (ロマンシング サ・ガ3)	4:49
9.	"Battle #4 (SaGa Frontier)"	Battle#4 (サガ フロンティア)	3:26
10.	"Battle #5 (SaGa Frontier)"	Battle#5 (サガ フロンティア)	3:19
11.	"A Challenge to God (Romancing SaGa Minstrel Song)"	神々への挑戦 (ミンストレルソング)	2:24
12.	"Awakening Memories (Romancing SaGa Minstrel Song)"	呼び醒まされた記憶 (ミンストレルソング)	3:17
13.	"Overture ~Opening Title~ (Piano Ver.) (Romancing SaGa Minstrel Song)"	オーバーチュア 〜オープニングタイトル〜 (ピアノVer ミンストレルソング)	6:05
14.	"Podorui (Piano Ver.) (Romancing SaGa 3)"	ポドールイ (ピアノVer ロマンシング サ・ガ3)	4:34

=== SaGa Series 20th Anniversary Original Soundtrack -Premium Box- ===
SaGa Series 20th Anniversary Original Soundtrack -Premium Box-

Box set by Various artists
- Released: August 26, 2009
- Genre: Video game soundtrack
- Label: Square Enix

The SaGa Series 20th Anniversary Original Soundtrack -Premium Box- is a soundtrack album collection of music from every released SaGa game. The compilation features 515 tracks on 20 CDs with a total length of 19:02:45, and includes a DVD of developer interviews, a stand display showing an illustration painted by Tomomi Kobayashi, and materials to build a display box for the CDs. The set consists of all of the soundtrack albums from the SaGa series, with All Sounds of SaGa broken up into one disc per game, rather than the original two discs. The set was published on August 26, 2009, to coincide with the 20th anniversary of the release of the first SaGa video game with the catalog numbers SQEX-10145~65. Patrick Gann described it as an excellent collection that was worth the purchase for anyone who wanted to own the entire set and did not already have most of the albums, though he noted that as it included multiple composers and styles the compilation box would not be justified for everyone who liked just some of the music of the SaGa series.

== Legacy ==
"Overture" from Romancing SaGa Minstrel Song was performed at the "Press Start -Symphony of Games- 2006" concert in Tokyo on September 22, 2006. Kenji Ito performed "Passionate Rhythm" from Romancing SaGa Minstrel Song at the "Extra: Hyper Game Music Event 2007" concert in Tokyo on July 7, 2007, along with other performers. Music from SaGa Frontier 2 was played at the fifth Symphonic Game Music Concert, held in Leipzig, Germany on August 22, 2007. The FILMharmonic Orchestra and Choir was conducted by Andy Brick and featured Jaromir Klepac as the pianist; they performed "Feldschlacht V", or "Field Battle 1". Selections from Piano Pieces "SF2" ~ Rhapsody on a Theme of SaGa Frontier 2 were played in a concert in Paris of Hamauzu's work on May 22, 2011. An arrangement of "Main Theme" from SaGa I and "Save the World" from SaGa 2 was performed on July 9, 2011, at the Symphonic Odysseys concert, which commemorated the music of Uematsu.

In addition to the albums produced, music from the original soundtracks of the SaGa games has been arranged for the piano and published by DOREMI Music Publishing. Books are available for Romancing SaGa 3, Romancing SaGa Minstrel Song, SaGa Frontier, SaGa Frontier II, and Unlimited SaGa. The compositions from Unlimited SaGa were rewritten by Tadaomi Idogawa as beginning to intermediate level piano solos, though they are meant to sound as much like the originals as possible. The music for the other books was written by Asako Niwa for piano solos of similar difficulty.

== See also ==
- Music of the Final Fantasy series
