= Lux-Pain =

2008 video game

- North American box art
- Developer: Killaware
- Publishers: JP: Marvelous Entertainment; NA: Ignition Entertainment; PAL: Rising Star Games
- Composers: Kenji Ito; Yasuyuki Suzuki
- Platform: Nintendo DS
- Release: JP: March 27, 2008; NA: March 24, 2009; EU: March 27, 2009; AU: 2009
- Genres: Adventure, visual novel
- Mode: Single-player

Lux-Pain (Note: Lux-Pain (ルクス・ペイン, Rukusu・Pein)) is a visual novel adventure video game developed by Killaware and published by Marvelous Entertainment for the Nintendo DS video game console. The game was released in Japan on March 27, 2008. It was published in North America by Ignition Entertainment on March 24, 2009, and in Europe by Rising Star Games on March 27, 2009.

== Gameplay ==
This game is mostly a visual novel, but there are a few new techniques specific for the DS. When using Lux-Pain, the player 'digs' into their surroundings using the stylus and touch screen. The player can 'dig' into people's feelings and emotions to find worms, or deep emotions. However, if the player digs in too long and is unable to erase the worms that surround the person, the person's mind becomes corrupt and it becomes game over for the player. The game ends if a battle against one of the Silent is lost. However, in some cases, if the player loses against a Silent (mainly in boss battles) they are able to retry.

== Plot ==
Lux-Pain is set in the historical Kisaragi City, a town plagued by mysteries from small mishaps to murders - with no logical explanation as to why these events occur. It seems "Silent", a worm born through hate and sadness, has infected humans and forced them to commit atrocious crimes. Atsuki's parents are the victim of such crimes. To avenge his parents, Atsuki goes through a dangerous operation to acquire Lux-Pain in his left arm, a power so strong that it turns his right eye golden when using it to seek and destroy Silent for good. In this game, however, there is a strong difference between Silent and worms. Worms are a sort of offspring created by Silent that are transferred to anyone who comes in contact with the host of the specific Silent. Worms are much weaker than Silent and are eliminated after simply finding them with the stylus and pressing on them for several seconds. Silent are considered the bosses of the game and though the player faces many smaller Silent they slowly show the larger Silent who is much stronger. After the first 10 "episodes" the player faces the first true Silent. This Silent is caused by the emotions of a deceased 12-year-old girl whose parents left for dead in her room. Though not mentioned specifically there are over 685 known Silent and the player starts with the 683rd.

== Development ==
Lux-Pain was developed by a team of ten people at Killaware, which was founded by former Atlus members Takeo Higashino and Kazuhiro Yamao. The game took a full 14 months to develop from start to finish. Higashino described the plot as being "dark," and stated that social problems such as truancy, group suicide, mental abuse on the internet, and cruelty to animals inspired him to create the game. He stated, "I think this game is a kind of 'antithesis' against the distortion of the current education or the recent crimes that occur amongst young people." Lux-Pain was translated internally at Killaware, but the Japanese voice acting was replaced for its localizations.

The soundtrack for Lux-Pain was composed by Kenji Ito and Yasuyuki Suzuki. It was released in Japan April 23, 2008. A CD featuring two vocal songs from the game ("Holding the Holy Pain" and "On/Off") sung by Yoko Takahashi was released on March 12, 2008. Two pre-order bonuses were included with the game with its release in Japan. They include Lux-Sound, a set of pre-arranged songs from the game's soundtrack along with a drama track; and Lux-Paint, an artbook.

== Reception ==
Reception

Aggregate score
Aggregator	Score
Metacritic	48 of 100

Review scores
Publication	Score
Destructoid	5 of 10
Famitsu	29 of 40
GamePro	1.5/5
GameSpot	3.5 of 10
GameZone	5 of 10
IGN	4.2 of 10
NGamer	81%
Nintendo Life	7/10
Nintendo Power	4 of 10
Official Nintendo Magazine	76%
411Mania	4.5 of 10
The Daily Telegraph	7 of 10

Lux-Pain received "generally unfavorable reviews" from video game critics according to the review aggregation website Metacritic. In Japan, however, Famitsu gave it a score of one seven, one eight, and two sevens for a total of 29 out of 40. Its localization was almost universally mentioned as being poor, with Austin Shau's GameSpot review noting that it "makes the story harder to follow than it should be," and "results in too much unintentional humor to take any of Lux-Pain's commentary seriously." The review expressed disappointment over the notion that what could have been a "poignant experience" is ruined by its failure "to deliver on the most basic element of a novel-style adventure," referring to its apparent poor writing. Daemon Hatfield of IGN remarked, "This graphic adventure doesn't make any sense, and all players are allowed to do is clumsily poke at static scenes and wade through endless pages of poorly-translated dialogue." Modojo's Robert Falcon panned the game entirely, calling the characters "useless."

The Daily Telegraph gave a more favorable review, though writer Chris Schilling also mentioned the game's "wonky localisation, with grammatical oddities ranging from female characters being referred to as 'he' to confusion over whether the setting is Japan or America." He opined that while "you'd presume those issues would be difficult to overlook (...) developer Killaware has crafted a world you'll find (...) difficult to pull yourself out of" and praised its "genuinely interesting themes – the kind most gamers are afraid to approach."
