= Concerto Gate =

- Developers: Square Enix, Ponsbic
- Publishers: JP: Gamepot; NA: OnNet USA
- Director: Kazutoshi Nakashima
- Producer: Noriaki Watanabe
- Composers: Hiroki Kikuta; Kenji Ito
- Platform: Microsoft Windows
- Release: JP: April 2007 (open beta); NA: July 2008 (closed beta)
- Genre: MMORPG
- Mode: Multiplayer

Concerto Gate (コンチェルトゲート, Koncheruto Gēto) is a massively multiplayer online role-playing game developed by Ponsbic and Square Enix. The game was released in Japan in 2007, and a planned North American release was cancelled after a beta release in July 2008.

== Gameplay ==
The battle style is a mixture of a turn-based and real-time, similar to the Final Fantasy series' ATB system, and enemies are found as random encounters. Combat takes place on a ten square grid, choosing a combination of physical attacks and ranged spells.

The game allows players to shape the landscape of the world, creating mountains and forests over a timespan of weeks, letting players uncover dungeons and exploring the world using the "terra-generating" system. The world is persistent, and consequences of mining and deforestation have to be managed.

== Plot ==
Set in the kingdom of Fahren, legend states that a hero will save the world.

== Development ==
It is the sequel to Cross Gate, a Japanese MMORPG from 2001. The game was developed by Square Enix and Ponsbic, published by Gamescampus, and run by Nexon and OnNet USA. Yousuke Saito was the executive producer, having previously worked on Star Ocean: Till the End of Time. Freelance illustrator Sunaho Tobe worked on the character designs. The game shares the "super deformed" character style common in manga comics.

The game was released in Japan in 2007 after a January beta test with 10,000 people, ending in April and launching in May. In October 2007, Square Enix announced that Nexon would publish the game in North America, doing a public beta in the first half of 2008, with release in December 2008 by OnNet. It was beta tested through North American publisher OnNet with 5,000 people from July 1 to the July 14th of 2008. In 2007 a release for China was in development, and it launched on November 10, 2008 by Shanghai Everstar. A server for Taiwan was launched on April 10, 2009 by UserJoy Technology, and another for Hong Kong on 22nd of the same month. The game service ended on April 17, 2012 in Taiwan. In 2013, the service ended in China on February 20, in Japan on March 27, and in Hong Kong on March 28. The game service relaunched for Hong Kong & Taiwan on May 28, 2014.

== Music ==
The music for the game was composed by Hiroki Kikuta, and the theme song by Kenji Ito. It is made up of orchestral music with Italian names for all the tracks, reminiscent of the traditional use of Italian words to describe a musical pieces mood. Since it was made in conjunction with Ito, Kikuta found it difficult to write the last two songs to complete the album and tie it together musically. One song that required a lot of effort, "Overture", became one of Kikuta's favorites. The soundtrack was released as an album through Kikuta's Nostrilia label with the title Concerto: The Extraordinary World of Concerto Gate in 2008. Drawing from the word "Concerto" in the title, the theme of the game's music was to be "harmony among many people". The album cover used was a painting called "Spring" by Lawrence Alma-Tadema.

== Reception ==
Joystiq praised Concerto Gate for attempting to bring the excitement and frustration of the random battle system to an MMORPG. In 2009, Game Campus announced that Concerto Gate and five other games would be compatible with the ONE Power-Up Game Card for video game related micro transactions.
