= Cross Gate =

2001 video game

- Cross Gate All in One edition Cover
- Developer: Dwango
- Publishers: Enix; Square Enix
- Composer: Kenji Ito
- Platform: Microsoft Windows
- Release: JP: July 26, 2001
- Genre: MMORPG

Cross Gate (Note: Japanese: クロスゲート, Hepburn: Kurosu Gēto) is a 2001 massively multiplayer online role-playing game, developed by Dwango and published by Square Enix (formerly Enix). It has been released in Japan, Taiwan, and mainland China since 2001.

On June 27, 2007, Square Enix announced that service of Cross Gate in Japan will be terminated on September 30, 2007. This will not affect the servers in China, Taiwan and Korea.

The sequel to the game, Concerto Gate, has finished its testing phase in Japan, but as of 2025 was not officially released.

While a modest success in Japan, the game had endured great popularity and a consistent following in Greater China. Square Enix of China licensed numerous mobile versions to Chinese and Taiwanese developers, including Cross Gate M in 2019, Cross Gate: New World in 2022 and Cross Gate: Rebirth in 2025. The former ceased operations in 2022, causing an outraged player to unsuccessfully sue publisher Gamania.

== Gameplay ==
Cross Gate uses a traditional Japanese anime style and 2D graphics system with player characters pre-rendered in 3D. The battle style is turn-based, resembling the Dragon Quest series, and players may choose to team up to a maximum of five players. There are 56 possible character choices, including 14 unique characters with four color variations. The game includes over 60 jobs and 80 unique skills.

One of the distinctive features of this game is its "Creature System." Slightly similar to the Pokémon series, this game allows players to carry five creatures with them while traveling and place one creature fighting with them while battling. There is a character class specialized in catching those creatures and trading them in an open marketplace where players bid for the strongest, rarest, or cutest creatures. By assigning ability points to five different dimensions when the creature levels up, players may grow their unique creatures. There are around 200 creatures to collect.

== Expansions ==
There has been three official expansion packs released for this game, involving two additional developers in this MMORPG.

- Cross Gate: Power-Up Kit Tatsu no Sunadokei, released December 13, 2002
- Cross Gate: Power-Up Kit 2 Rakuen no Tamago, released December 18, 2003
- Cross Gate: Power-Up Kit 3 Tenkai no Kishi to Hoshiei no Utahime, released December 22, 2004
