= Crossgate AG =

- Type: Aktiengesellschaft
- Industry: B2B integration, B2B transaction network, automation of business process, supply chain management, e-Invoicing, Industry-specific knowledge (automotive, trade, consumer products, technology, pharmaceutical, chemical, process industry)
- Founded: Starnberg, Germany (2001)
- Fate: Acquired by SAP, September 20, 2011
- Headquarters: Munich, Germany
- Key people: Stefan Tittel, Founder and CEO
- Number of employees: 200 (Estimated, October 2009)
- Website: www.crossgate.com

Crossgate AG was a multinational company which had developed a network approach to B2B transactions allowing for data to be transferred regardless of EDI system or EDI map. Crossgate's network approach attracted a partnership and investment from SAP SE.

On September 20, 2011, SAP acquired Crossgate.

The company was headquartered in Munich, Germany with field offices in Berlin, Frankfurt am Main, Waldbronn, Cologne, and Walldorf. As well as the four sites in Germany, Crossgate is represented with subsidiary branches in Atlanta (Crossgate, Inc.), London (Crossgate UK Ltd), Milan (Crossgate Italia S.p.A.) and Paris (Crossgate s.a.r.l.). Crossgate AG operated as a subsidiary of Otto Wolff von Amerongen Group.

== History ==
Crossgate AG was founded as Indatex SCI GmbH in 2001 by Stefan Tittel. In 2006 Indatex SCI GmbH changed its name to Crossgate AG. That same year Daniel Hopp whose father is Dietmar Hopp, founder and major shareholder of SAP SE became financially involved and Crossgate's operations were expanded.

On 14 October 2008, SAP SE announced at SAP TechED 2008 Berlin. that it has made a strategic investment by taking a minority stake in Crossgate, a business-to-business (B2B) integration service provider. This follows several deployments of Crossgate's B2B 360° Services, which utilizes SAP to enable mulltienterprise B2B integration (which SAP calls "business network transformation"), one of the fundamental points of SAP's future strategy. Financial details have not been disclosed but a SAP Executive Board Member has joined the Crossgate Supervisory Board.

On September 20, 2011, SAP acquired Crossgate for a three-digit million amount.

== Shareholders ==
The main shareholders of Crossgate AG were the SAP founder's family Dietmar Hopp's son, Otto Wolff von Amerongen and the Al-Jomaih Investment Group.

== Acquisitions ==
March 2, 2010 SAP Finally Makes a Decisive Move in the B2B Market

On 7 November 2006, Crossgate announced that it has acquired a majority interest in B&N Software, a developer of software components to support multienterprise process integration including M@gic EDDY.
