= Cross Coombe =

Coordinates: 50.3223°N 5.1890°W

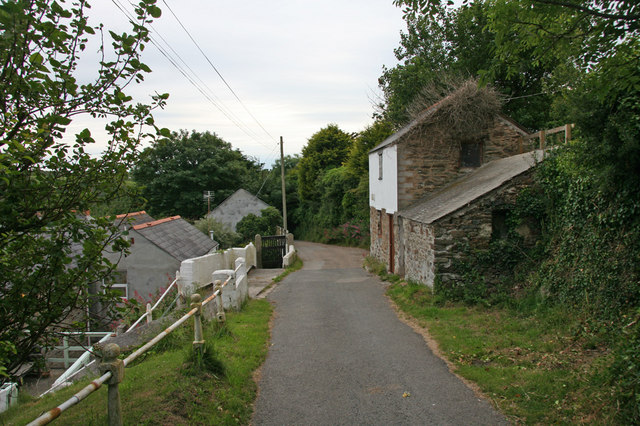
- The lane through Cross Coombe

- Location within Cornwall
- OS grid reference: SW731518
- Civil parish: St Agnes
- Unitary authority: Cornwall
- Ceremonial county: Cornwall
- Region: South West
- Country: England
- Sovereign state: United Kingdom
- Post town: St Agnes
- Postcode district: TR5

Cross Coombe is a hamlet in the parish of St Agnes (where the 2011 census population is included), Cornwall, England, UK.
