= Croft Mitchell =

Hamlet in Cornwall, England

Coordinates: 50°11′15″N 5°16′15″W

- Location within Cornwall
- OS grid reference: SW666370
- Civil parish: Camborne
- Unitary authority: Cornwall
- Ceremonial county: Cornwall
- Region: South West
- Country: England
- Sovereign state: United Kingdom
- Post town: Camborne
- Postcode district: TR14
- Police: Devon and Cornwall
- Fire: Cornwall
- Ambulance: South Western

Croft Mitchell is a hamlet in the parish of Camborne, Cornwall, England.
