= Croes-lan =

Village in Ceredigion, Wales

Coordinates: 52.074476°N 4.360269°W

- Location within Ceredigion
- OS grid reference: SN 3834 4442
  - Cardiff: 65.2 mi (104.9 km)
  - London: 185.1 mi (297.9 km)
- Community: Troedyraur
- Principal area: Ceredigion
- Country: Wales
- Sovereign state: United Kingdom
- Post town: Llandysul
- Postcode district: SA44
- Police: Dyfed-Powys
- Fire: Mid and West Wales
- Ambulance: Welsh
- UK Parliament: Ceredigion Preseli
- Senedd Cymru – Welsh Parliament: Ceredigion

Croes-lan is a small village in the community of Troedyraur, Ceredigion, Wales, which is 65.2 miles (104.9 km) from Cardiff and 185.1 miles (297.8 km) from London. Croes-lan is represented in the Senedd by Elin Jones (Plaid Cymru) and the Member of Parliament is Ben Lake (Plaid Cymru).

== See also ==
- List of localities in Wales by population
