= Cross Hill, Cornwall =

Hamlet in Cornwall, England

Coordinates: 50.537°N 4.761°W

Cross Hill
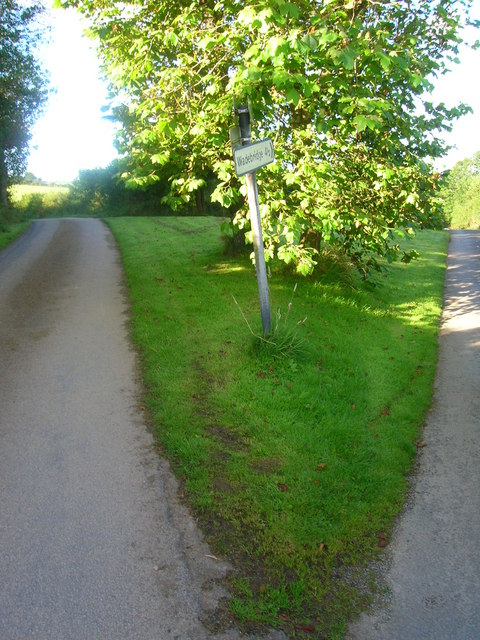
- Cross Hill

- Location within Cornwall
- OS grid reference: SX04477446
- Unitary authority: Cornwall
- Ceremonial county: Cornwall
- Region: South West
- Country: England
- Sovereign state: United Kingdom

Cross Hill is a hamlet and road junction near St Mabyn in Cornwall, England.
