= Crossgate Farmhouse =

Farmhouse in Werrington, Cornwall, England

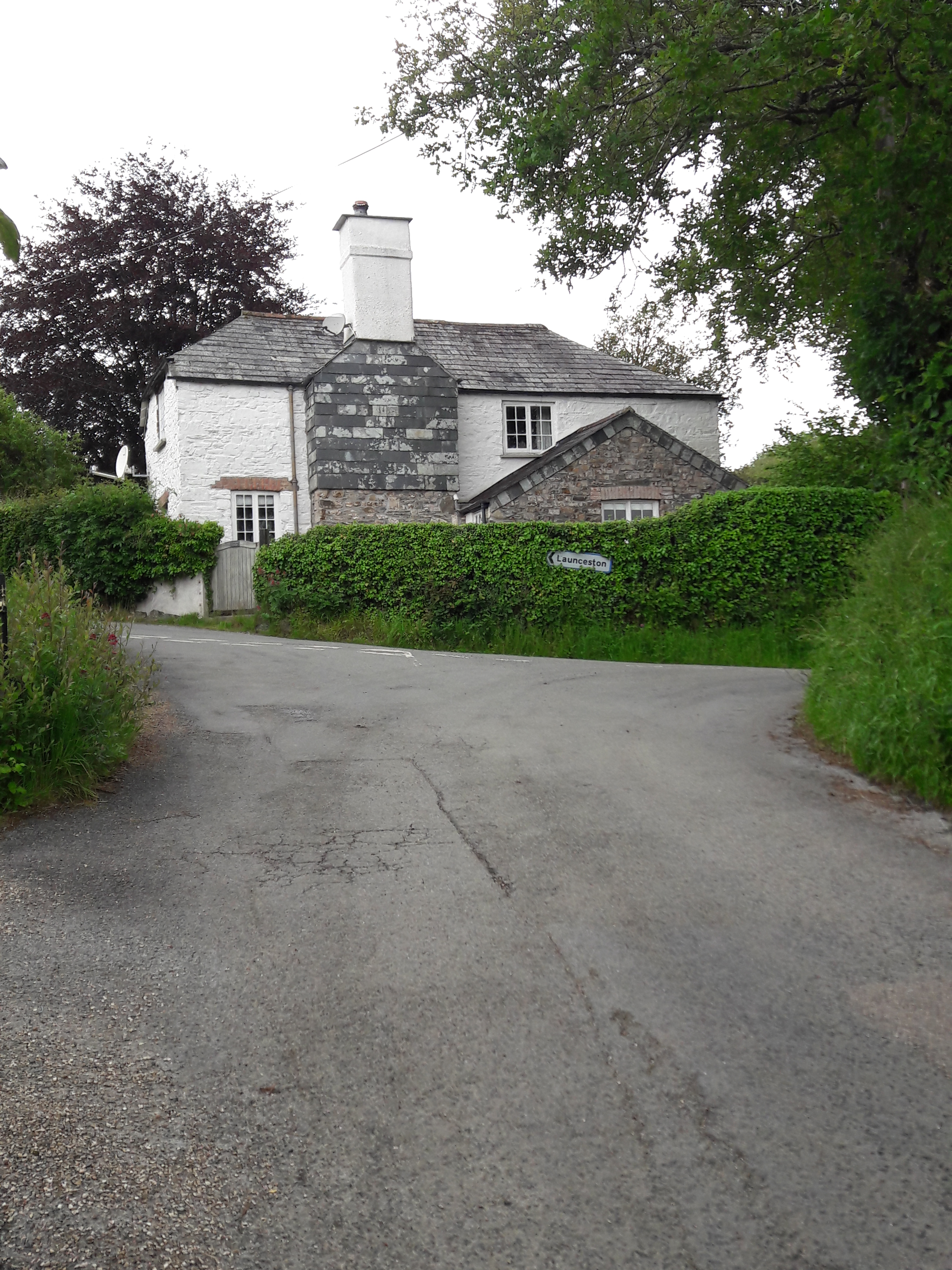

- Location within Cornwall
- 50.67098°N 4.34775°W
- Location: Werrington, Cornwall, England

Listed Building – Grade II
- Official name: Crossgate Farmhouse
- Designated: 11 January 1989
- Reference no.: 1142853

Crossgate Farmhouse is a Grade II listed farmhouse in the civil parish of Werrington, Cornwall, England, UK. It was perhaps built in the 18th century and was remodelled in the early 19th century.
