= Crossgates, Cumbria =

Hamlet in Cumbria, England

Coordinates: 54.576°N 3.430°W

Crossgates
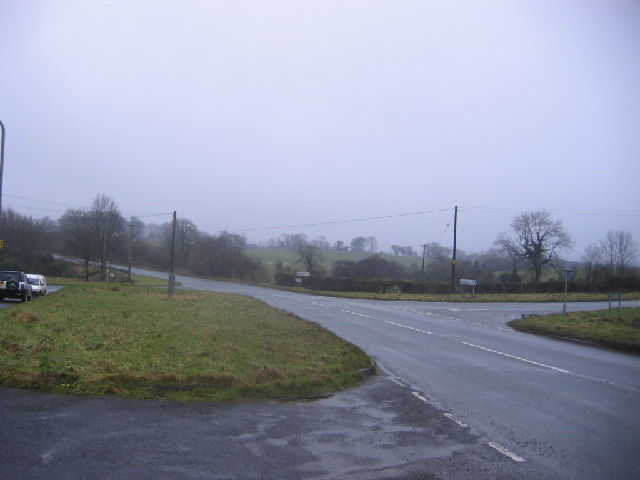
- Crossgates

- Location in Copeland Borough Location within Cumbria
- OS grid reference: NY075210
- Civil parish: Lamplugh
- Unitary authority: Cumberland
- Ceremonial county: Cumbria
- Region: North West
- Country: England
- Sovereign state: United Kingdom
- Post town: WORKINGTON
- Postcode district: CA14
- Dialling code: 01946
- Police: Cumbria
- Fire: Cumbria
- Ambulance: North West
- UK Parliament: Whitehaven and Workington

Crossgates is a hamlet in Cumbria, England. It is located just to the northeast of Asby.
