= Cry On =

Cancelled video game

- Developers: Mistwalker; Cavia
- Publisher: AQ Interactive
- Producers: Hironobu Sakaguchi; Takuya Iwasaki
- Artists: Kimihiko Fujisaka (2005-2007); Manabu Kusunoki (2007-2008)
- Writer: Hironobu Sakaguchi
- Composer: Nobuo Uematsu
- Platform: Xbox 360
- Release: Cancelled
- Genre: Action role-playing

Cry On (Note: Japanese: クライオン, Hepburn: Kurai On) was a cancelled action role-playing game in development by Mistwalker and Cavia for Xbox 360. Mistwalker founder Hironobu Sakaguchi acted as co-producer and writer, Drakengard artist Kimihiko Fujisaka was designing the characters, and composer Nobuo Uematsu was attached to the project. From 2007 onwards, artwork was redesigned by Manabu Kusunoki.

The storyline was based in a fantasy world equivalent to the Middle Ages, where humans begin using a race called the Bogles for war. The plot would have followed lead protagonist Sally and her companion Bogle that could speak human language. The gameplay and narrative would have been designed to evoke emotion, and Sakaguchi was experimenting with different control schemes for each playstyle.

Cry On was announced in 2005, shortly after the creation of publisher AQ Interactive as one of several next-generation titles. It had a budget of ¥1 billion and projected production time of up to two years. Following a prolonged media silence, AQ Interactive announced its cancellation in 2008, attributing it to current and projected market conditions. Reactions to its cancellation were generally negative. Sakaguchi reused designs in his later title Terra Battle, and shared a concept trailer in 2014. Sakaguchi, Fujisaka and Uematsu later collaborated on The Last Story.

== Concept and premise ==
Cry On was an action role-playing game set in a fantasy world themed after the Middle Ages. The narrative would have centered around the relationship between humans and small stone creatures called Bogles, which acted as protective charms. Some humans seek to use Bogles as weapons by restoring their ability to become giants. Players would take on the role of Sally, a girl with the power to restore Bogles to giant size, and she would be accompanied by a Bogle who spoke human languages. Gameplay would have been divided between longer areas controlling Sally, and shorter sections using the Bogle. Each section would have had a different gameplay focus, and planned but undefined puzzle elements were featured.

== Production ==
Cry On was being co-developed for the Xbox 360 by Mistwalker and Cavia, and set to be published by AQ Interactive. Mistwalker was a new studio working on multiple 360 projects including Blue Dragon and Lost Odyssey, while Cavia was known for the Drakengard series. Mistwalker founder Hironobu Sakaguchi, known for his work on the Final Fantasy series, was co-producer and scenario writer. The second producer was Takuya Iwasaki, who had worked on the original Drakengard as line producer. The characters were being designed by Drakengard artist Kimihiko Fujisaka, and the music was being composed by Sakaguchi's recurring collaborator Nobuo Uematsu. Uematsu, inspired by the game's themes, said that he would create an emotional and melancholy score.

The game was Sakaguchi's first time creating an action RPG. He estimated that production would require between 1.5 and two years of development time. AQ Interactive allotted a budget of ¥1 billion (equivalent at the time to US$8.5 million). According to a later statement from an artist who worked on the game, a version was also being developed for PlayStation 3. Development ran parallel to that of Blue Dragon and Lost Odyssey, which Sakaguchi described as difficult for the team due to work pressure of producing multiple large-scale projects at once.

Commenting on the gameplay, Iwasaki said he aimed to combine Sakaguchi's knowledge of RPGs with Cavia's previous experience developing action titles. During production, Sakaguchi was experimenting with multiple control schemes, including the possibility of using both controller sticks to manipulate the Bogle's actions. It was planned to have a playtime of between thirty and forty hours. As with his other projects, Sakaguchi wanted the game to prompt emotion from players. When announced, Sakaguchi said the scenario was roughly half-finished. The central theme was the evocation of tears, in the context of both sadness and joy.

The visuals made use of cel-shading, with Sakaguchi describing it as not the typical cel-shading used in video games of the time. While it looked like 2D animation, all graphics were 3D and made use of a special visual filter dubbed "Fujisaka shader" which produced the effect of drawn sketches in motion. Commenting on Fujisaka's designs, Sakaguchi praised them as bringing dignity alongside the theme of sadness. By 2007, Fujisaka had been replaced by Manabu Kusunoki, an artist from Artoon who had done concept work for Blue Dragon. Sakaguchi brought in Kusunoki after discussing the project with him and hearing his artistic suggestions. While Kusunoki was in charge of the artwork, Cavia remained as co-developer. Manabu became character and concept designer, resulting in an artistic shift for the game, with Sakaguchi wanting the art to be more realistic.

Cry On was announced to the public in December 2005. It was shown off using a concept trailer, detailing its animation style, and gameplay and theme concepts. It was one of several next-generation game titles announced by AQ Interactive following its formation earlier that year, alongside Cavia's Bullet Witch and Vampire Rain from Artoon. It was Mistwalker's fourth announced project within 2005 following Blue Dragon, Lost Odyssey and the Nintendo DS title ASH: Archaic Sealed Heat. The game's release was planned to follow ASH: Archaic Sealed Heat and Lost Odyssey.

== Cancellation and legacy ==
In December 2008, AQ Interactive announced that Cry On had been cancelled. The company made the decision after analyzing the current and projected video game market. Several websites reacted to the cancellation with disappointment. Between its announcement in 2005 and its cancellation in 2008, little was heard of the title, and IGN's John Tanaka referred to it as vaporware. Kyle Hilliard of Game Informer compared the game's scenario, and general situation of development hell, to The Last Guardian. In a 2014 interview, Sakaguchi said he has no plans to revive or revisit Cry On. Also that year, Sakaguchi released the original concept trailer through his YouTube channel.

In a 2009 post on the Mistwalker website, Sakaguchi said that regretted being unable to tell the game's story. Fujisaka, who joined Mistwalker as an in-house artist, posted his concept art for Cry On on Mistwalker's website, both apologizing for its lack of release and feeling a lack of polish in the artwork. When Cry On was mentioned in a 2009 interview, Uematsu felt glad it was cancelled as he was overworked during that period. Sakaguchi, Fujisaka and Uematsu would all collaborate on Mistwalker's next project, The Last Story for the Wii. Some enemy designs from Cry On were reused by Sakaguchi in the 2014 mobile game Terra Battle.
