= Operation Rainfall =

Organization campaigning for the global release of Japan-exclusive video games

- Logo
- Formation: June 22, 2011; 15 years ago
- Type: Fan campaign (2011–2015); News blog (2015–present)
- Purpose: To publicize Japanese video games
- Website: operationrainfall.com

Operation Rainfall, commonly known as oprainfall, was a video game-oriented fan campaign founded to promote the release of games not available in North America. Initially aimed at promoting the North American release of three games on the aging Wii only released in Japan and Europe, it later transitioned into a community blog dedicated to niche Japanese games and further fan campaigns aimed at the localization of Japan-exclusive games. From inception, its stated intention was to show publisher Nintendo the demand for the three chosen games.

Beginning in 2011, it was designed as a push for the release of Xenoblade Chronicles, The Last Story, and Pandora's Tower, three games released late in the lifespan of the Wii. The campaign was acknowledged by Nintendo, and though they initially announced that they had no plans, all three games were eventually released in North America, the former by Nintendo itself and the latter two by Xseed Games. Reception of the campaign has been favorable overall, and its perceived success when compared to similar earlier campaigns was also noted.

== History ==
=== Origins ===
The campaign focused on three role-playing games created for Nintendo's Wii home video game console during the last years of its life: Xenoblade Chronicles, The Last Story, and Pandora's Tower. Xenoblade Chronicles, developed by Monolith Soft, was an entry in the Xeno series, initially announced as an original project dubbed Monado: Beginning of the World. The game was announced under this title at the 2009 Electronic Entertainment Expo (E3), but its title was changed to honor earlier Xeno games created by the game's writer Tetsuya Takahashi. The Last Story was developed by Mistwalker, a company created by Hironobu Sakaguchi and intended to be a game that ran contrary to typical elements of the genre based on feedback from the company's previous games Blue Dragon and Lost Odyssey. Pandora's Tower was developed by Ganbarion, who had previously worked primarily on licensed games and pitched the concept to Nintendo after favorably impressing them with their work on Jump Ultimate Stars. Despite hopes from fans and journalists that the games would be released in North America, Nintendo gave no comment on the matter. The only explanation for the lack of localization was related to The Last Story: Nintendo stated that due to their work on Kirby's Epic Yarn and games for the new Nintendo 3DS, The Last Story was too much effort. Nintendo of Europe did want to feature Xenoblade Chronicles at E3 2011, but Nintendo's American branch prevented it without explanation. In response to this and continued silence on both The Last Story and Pandora's Tower, Operation Rainfall was born.

=== Concept and later development ===
Following the announcements concerning the three games, Operation Rainfall came into existence in an effort to persuade Nintendo to bring the games to North America. Xenoblade Chronicles and The Last Story were chosen for their genealogy, while Pandora's Tower was selected due to its unique mechanics and the fact that it was also published by Nintendo for the Wii. The team also decided on the games as they were already confirmed for an English release in Europe and had received critical acclaim in Japan, so they avoided trying to push for the release of critically and commercially unsuccessful games such as Earth Seeker. The campaign's name stemmed from the group's wish to reach out to Nintendo of America with requests. Beginning in June 2011 on the message boards of gaming site IGN, it was met with support from the gaming community. Its campaign was spread across letters and emails to Nintendo of America president Reggie Fils-Aimé, in addition to campaigns on Facebook and Twitter. Both physical and digital media were chosen for the campaign to make them more obvious and less able to be deleted, as a purely digital campaign would have been. To this end, letters and objects inspired by the games were sent to Nintendo of America.

Operation Rainfall gave itself an eighteen-month deadline, with the conclusion of their campaign planned to coincide with the release of Nintendo's new Wii U home console in November 2012. The first phase of the campaign focused on Xenoblade Chronicles, with a part of their campaign resulting in large numbers of pre-orders being placed for the game on Amazon.com under its placeholder name: the game reached #1 in the site's pre-order list, beating both The Legend of Zelda: Ocarina of Time 3D and the PlayStation 3 bundle for Call of Duty: Black Ops. The second phase of the campaign coincided with the European release of Xenoblade Chronicles, with the aim being for fans to make Wii purchases on its release date of August 19, 2011, in addition to further letters to Nintendo of America. Following the announcement of the game's North American release, the group refocused their efforts on The Last Story. For Pandora's Tower, the campaign expanded to pitching to recognized publishers of niche Japanese games, including Atlus, Xseed Games, Aksys Games, and NIS America. To fund the campaign, they asked for donations, offering a special wallpaper in return, and for larger contributions a special slip case for all three games.

While Xenoblade Chronicles was published in North America by Nintendo, The Last Story was taken up by Xseed Games. With the announcement of the North American release of The Last Story, the fan community launched their own site. Dubbed "Oprainfall", it continued news coverage of the original three games, in addition to extending to other similar niche games and hosting fan petitions. Pandora's Tower was also eventually released in North America, once again by Xseed Games. As of 2015, the site has transitioned from a fan campaign hub to a blog and news site focusing on Japanese games considered niche in the West, in addition to continuing support for similar fan campaigns.

== Public reaction ==
When it first appeared and gained popular support, Operation Rainfall drew considerable media attention, being covered by Kotaku, IGN, Eurogamer, GamesRadar, Joystiq, Game Informer, Destructoid, and Japanese gaming sites Inside Games and ITMedia. In addition to popular and press support, it received favorable responses from Soraya Saga, the writer for Xenogears and Xenosaga, and Mistwalker.

More extensive coverage has been given by some sites. VentureBeat noted that, while comparable with other similar campaigns, Operation Rainfall was notable for maintaining an identity during its efforts. Zach Kaplan of Nintendo Life said that the campaign needed to make a clear mark, showing that the success of the then-announced Xenoblade Chronicles was not a fluke. In a later feature for the same website, Thomas Whitehead said that the otherwise niche and slightly unremarkable Pandora's Tower had been granted a level of mystery and anticipation among fans through its inclusion in the Operation Rainfall campaign. In an interview feature conducted after the announcement of a North American release for Pandora's Tower, PC World noted that Operation Rainfall was going against the trend with its complete success in pushing to bring all three games to North America. In particular, it compared them to the unsuccessful efforts by fans to bring Japan-exclusive installments of the Mother series to the West.

The campaign was also noted by the game's publishers. Nintendo acknowledged the campaign and its effort in the same month it began, but said that there were no plans to release the three games in North America. Three months into the campaign, several Nintendo employees were asking the group to stop their campaign. In 2013, speaking about Xenoblade Chronicles, Fils-Aimé said that while the campaign had not been a decisive factor in their ultimate decision to release the game in North America, they did take it into consideration. In an interview concerning their role in localizing The Last Story, Xseed stated that Nintendo had long been open to partnering with another company for a North American release, and that Operation Rainfall had not influenced Nintendo. Later, in their press announcement concerning Pandora's Tower, they acknowledged that it was a game with a "vocal" fan base, but did not mention Operation Rainfall by name. They also stated that it was the positive sales and fan efforts for The Last Story that prompted them to release the game in North America.
