= ASH: Archaic Sealed Heat =

2007 video game

- Developers: Mistwalker; Racjin
- Publisher: Nintendo
- Directors: Yoshimori Aisaka; Shigeru Maekawa
- Producers: Kensuke Tanaka; Hitoshi Yamagami
- Designer: Hironobu Sakaguchi
- Artists: Hideo Minaba; Takao Watanabe
- Writer: Hironobu Sakaguchi
- Composers: Hitoshi Sakimoto; Masaharu Iwata; Isao Kasai
- Platform: Nintendo DS
- Release: JP: October 4, 2007
- Genre: Tactical role-playing
- Mode: Single-player

ASH: Archaic Sealed Heat (Note: In Japanese, the title is Archaic Sealed Heat (Japanese: アルカイック シールド ヒート, Hepburn: Arukaikku Shīrudo Hīto), with ASH used as an acronym.) is a 2007 tactical role-playing game developed by Mistwalker and Racjin and published by Nintendo for the Nintendo DS exclusively in Japan. The storyline follows Aisya, princess of Millinear, after a fire monster burns the kingdom to ashes on her coronation day. She gains the ability to revive the dead as ash-formed bodies and sets out to investigate the cause behind the disaster. The gameplay combines tactical grid-based movement of 2D characters in the field with traditional turn-based battles, in which party members are represented by CGI models.

The game was designed by Mistwalker founder and Final Fantasy creator Hironobu Sakaguchi, who acted as executive producer, writer and designer. Production lasted roughly two years, with Sakaguchi using his love for the genre when creating the design concept. The game was among the first projects conceived and announced for Mistwalker. Sakaguchi collaborated with artist Hideo Minaba and composers Hitoshi Sakimoto and Masaharu Iwata, who had worked with Sakaguchi during their time at Square. Due to its heavy use of CGI graphics, it was the first DS title to ship on a two-gigabit cartridge. The title debuted to low sales in Japan and received mixed reception from critics; it was praised for its narrative and gameplay, but its graphics and pacing saw mixed responses.

== Gameplay ==
A battle sequence in ASH: Archaic Sealed Heat; main character Aisya and her party (bottom screen) fight a monster (top screen) in the battle mode.

ASH: Archaic Sealed Heat is a tactical role-playing game where players take on the role of protagonist Aisya and her army in battles against enemy forces, progressing through a series of battles across a chapter-based narrative. The game is controlled using the Nintendo DS stylus, with the display split between its two screens; the top screen is used for displaying cutscenes and the battle party, while the bottom screen is used for party control and shows the enemy party in battle. Battles are split into three sections; story with battle objectives, field gameplay, and battles. The game features New Game Plus, with players carrying over money earned into the next playthrough.

Levels play out as turn-based battles in a system dubbed "Team Tactics"; the player has a set number of three-character parties, with these parties represented on the field as a sprite of the party's current leader. In-game, only a living person can be a team leader, with the other two members being ash warriors. During the field section of battles, players move their assigned units on a square grid, with units represented using 2D character sprites. Movement and attacking consume a shared pool of Action Points. Once depleted, the player's turn ends, and the bar is replenished by a set amount at the start of the player's next turn. Once in position, depending on the proximity of enemies, a unit can be given different commands, such as attacking or performing an ability. Chests and non-playable characters can be found during field sections, with chests yielding items, equipment. or in-game currency.

In battle, the gameplay switches to a turn-based combat system. with characters represented using CGI models. The player team fights the enemy team until one side is defeated or the player party flees battle. If an enemy initiates combat, each member of an enemy unit performs one action, with the battle ending once these are completed. During player-initiated battles, actions are selected for each character from a menu, including a standard attack; a magic spell or attack if possible; using an item; defending from attacks; a standby in which a unit does not act during a turn; special skills dubbed Arts; cinematic attacks dubbed EX Arts; and fleeing battle. Within the party, a character can be positioned close or at a distance from the enemy, which impacts how they attack and what skills and abilities can be used. Upon raising their experience level, a character's health and magic meters are restored. If a party member is not revived during battle, they are inaccessible in the next battle, while a party leader's defeat removes the entire party from battle. Even if other parties are active, the game ends and must be restarted from an earlier save point if Aisya is defeated.

Alongside unique characters with special skills and abilities are generic units assigned a character class. The classes are the Long Sword, a basic melee fighter; Black Magic users, who can perform powerful damaging elemental spells; White Magic users, who can use healing spells and raise defence; the Butler, which specializes in close-range melee combat and has higher defence than the Long Sword; the Ittemer, which can send items at a distance; the Steeler, a thief-like character with high agility who can attract enemy units away from more vulnerable targets; and Monster Magic users, who specialize in support abilities and summoning creatures to fight in their place. These generic units die permanently if they fall in battle. Between battles, the player outfits and customizes their party and individual units, in addition to buying replacement genetic units. At the end of each chapter, the player is graded on their performance, with higher grades granting better rewards of experience and items. Earlier chapters can be repeated to earn additional experience points and currency for buying equipment and items between chapters.

== Synopsis ==
=== Setting and characters ===
ASH is set in an unnamed fantasy world divided between three kingdoms, Millinear, Sumnelthia and Aceshin. Samnersia and Acesin are in a state of war with each other, with mechanical soldiers dubbed the Mechanics said to be from Acesin inflaming the conflict. In ancient times, a magical flame that burned all to magical ash was sealed away. It is released in the game's opening and begins wreaking havoc across the world in the form of creatures called Salamanders and the greater Flame Serpent.

The main protagonist is Aisya, whose coronation as princess of Millinear takes place during the game's opening. In her journey, she is accompanied by her regent Bullnequ, a loyal figure who supported her through her childhood. She is also joined by Dan, a soldier of Sumnelthia; Cootrolan, a sentient Mechanic; Emu, a member of the reclusive Forest People; Maritie, Acesin's princess who likewise chases the Flame Serpent; and Jeekwawen, a mercenary swordsman. They end up clashing with Bamyganant, a soldier from the planet's future who leads a Mechanic faction.

=== Plot ===
At Aisya's coronation, a Salamander appears and burns everyone except her into ashes. She retrieves her hereditary bracelet, and when creatures born of the Flame Serpent attack, Bullnequ is reanimated from the ashes and defends her. Wanting to restore her kingdom, Aisya sets out in pursuit of the Flame Serpent, who subsequently attacks and destroys the other kingdoms. Using her power to revive others from ash to build her army, she meets and partners with Dan, rescues Emu from the destruction of her people, and Bamyganant nearly kills her. Although Jeekwawen saves her and the party, Bullnequ is destroyed. They later salvage Cootrolan from a group of attacking Mechanics, who reveals the Mechanics are from a future where Mechanics and humans are locked in conflict in a world dying from an imbalance of energy. After finding Sumnelthia's capital under attack from the Flame Serpent, Aisya rescues Maritie from the city's dungeons, who believes Sumnelthia is behind the Flame Serpent. Dan likewise thinks Aceshin is responsible, and leaves when Aisya prevents him from killing Maritie.

They discover evidence of Sumnelthia collecting energy from the Salamanders, which is produced when new Mechanics are crafted, then escape through a cave system while fighting through monsters born of human fear and rage. They also learn the Salamanders are manifestations of the planet's will that human conflict summons, and that they must restore the balance between the benevolent white and malevolent black energy. Cootrolan ends up resetting to a hostile position after encountering Mechanics, forcing the party to leave him behind. The party confront the Sumnelthian King, who created the Mechanics in a bid to conquer the world, and he sends Jeekwawen and a conflicted Dan to attack the group. Dan rejoins them, and upon learning their mission to restore the world's balance, Jeekwawen allows them to proceed. They confront the Sumnelthian King, but when he summons more Mechanics, a powerful Fire Dragon is born and begins destroying the world. The King escapes, and the group seek answers in Aceshin, with Jeekwawen eventually joining them. Bamyganant nearly ambushes and kills them, but Maritie's mother Aceshin XV saves them and they reunite with a restored Cootrolan. The Fire Dragon soon attacks Aceshin and turns its people to ash.

Aceshin XV sacrifices herself to hold back Bamyganant so the party can escape on airship back to Sumnelthia to stop the King. The Fire Dragon unexpectedly shields the ship from Sumnelthia's defence guns, and they learn Bamyganant allied with the King to secure the Mechanics' future domination of the world. Bamyganant and the King respectively place Cootrolan and Dan under their control, turning them against the party. Dan briefly recovers when Bamyganant kills the King after activating the Mechanic army and generating a giant Fire Dragon. The party sacrifices itself to save Aisya from its attack, and Cootrolan is left to guard the present-day core of Bamyganant. Aceshin XV returns in ash form along with Aisya's companions, who reveal the Fire Dragon's purpose is to test human worth and reset the planet if they fail. With the world's balance between black and white energy destroyed, Aisya fights and defeats Bamyganant, first by Cootrolan sacrificing itself to destroy Bamyganant's present-day core, then when the party defeats him when the world's black energy preserves him. The Mechanic future is erased and the world restored, and the last Fire Dragon asks Aisya her wish; Aisya wishes for a "future", and the Fire Dragon resurrects those turned to ashes, including Bullnequ.

== Development ==
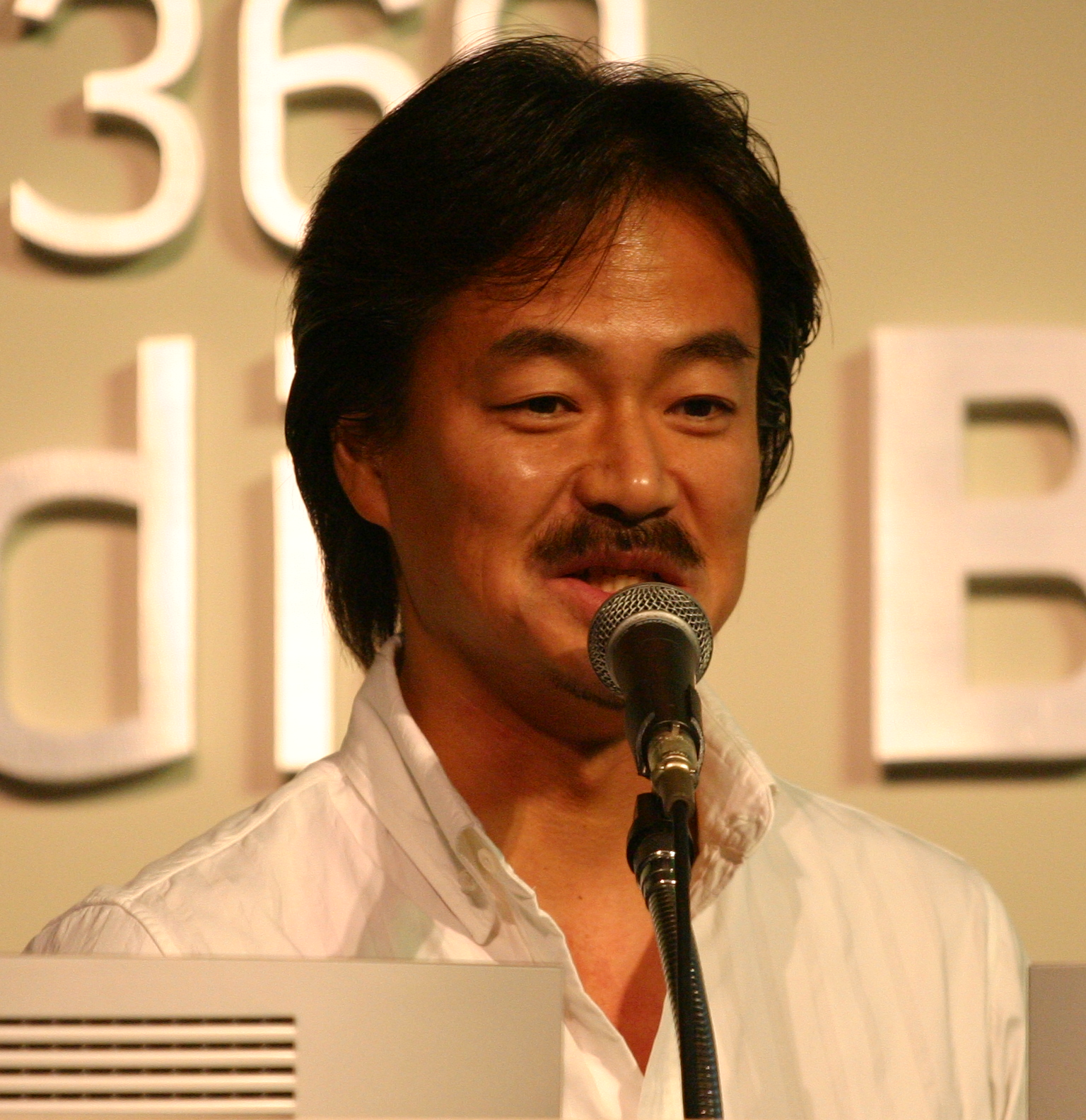
Executive producer, writer and designer Hironobu Sakaguchi pictured in 2006

Mistwalker founder Hironobu Sakaguchi was fond of the tactical role-playing genre and had wanted to develop one himself. While he had created design concepts for them, such as Final Fantasy Tactics while working at Square, he had never been directly involved. He used ASH to express genre ideas he had been storing for twenty years by that point. The game was in its concept stages during early 2005, with production lasting approximately two years. It was one of three projects being created by Sakaguchi and Mistwalker at the time alongside Blue Dragon and Lost Odyssey. The game was co-developed with Racjin, who would later work with Square Enix on remakes of early SaGa titles. Sakaguchi acted as the game's executive producer, writer and designer. Mistwalker vice president Kensuke Tanaka acted as the producer. It was co-directed by Yoshimori Aisaka and Shigeru Maekawa.

Sakaguchi was attracted to the DS, as it felt like a PDA-style device he used to play games during flights between Hawaii and Japan, and he was fascinated by the idea of creating a world conveyed using two screens. This wish led to battle information and action being equally divided between the top and bottom screens rather than one being subordinate to the other. He created an early prototype build which proved to be more successful than he expected. For the gameplay, he wanted to pay homage to early influences on his liking for the genre, including Fire Emblem and Famicom Wars alongside Tactics, but make the gameplay stand out. The gameplay design drew inspiration from the Daisenryaku series. Sakaguchi's wish was to create a hybrid system between tactical RPGs and traditional RPGs. Game balance was an important factor for him, as he wanted the title to be approachable for genre newcomers, leading to some unspecified design changes and a careful incorporation of tutorials to explain its battle system.

The storyline was created after the gameplay and world design was completed. The concept of people being reborn from magical ashes was present from the outset, though his initial plan for them to remain ash-colored rather than returning to their normal states was vetoed by the other staff. Tanaka, despite being part of discussions about the main plot, described the story and concept as Sakaguchi's alone. Sakaguchi described the game's tone as very different from that of Blue Dragon. He wanted to create a "thick" story covering the mysteries of the game's world. As with much of his narrative work, the central theme was how it felt to die and disappear, both for a person and those close to them. The heaviness of these themes were offset by him by making the central narrative a character-driven story about friendship and connections. The name of lead character Aisya was taken from the heroine of one of Sakaguchi's early games, Will: The Death Trap II (1985). The game also made limited use of voice acting, to keep with the more serious tone. The plot writing was finished by October 2005.

The art director and character designer was Hideo Minaba, an illustrator who had worked with Sakaguchi on Final Fantasy XI and had also contributed to the art design of Final Fantasy XII. By 2004, Minaba had recently founded his own art studio Designation. Although he was also working on Sakaguchi's other Mistwalker projects in various capacities, ASH was Minaba's first role as character designer. Sakaguchi attributed Minaba's designs with inspiring him to rewrite planned story dialogue, something that he normally did not do on a project. He also described the art as not being typical of DS titles at the time. The game's illustrations were handled by Minaba and Mistwalker's Takao Watanabe. Sakaguchi wanted high-quality CGI elements, aiming for a more realistic appearance than other titles on the platform. Because of the high amount of CGI graphics in-game, it was the first DS title to use a two-gigabit cartridge. The CGI elements and cutscenes were created collaboratively by Robot Inc., Shirogumi and Ufotable.

=== Music ===
The game's music was composed and arranged by Hitoshi Sakimoto and Masaharu Iwata through Sakimoto's studio Basiscape. Sakimoto also acted as music producer. An additional track was composed by Isao Kasai of Racjin. Basiscape was invited onto the project by Sakaguchi, who was a longtime fan of Sakimoto's work. Sakaguchi provided Sakimoto and Iwata with story materials and art assets as inspiration for the music. It was Sakimoto's first work for the DS, and necessitated compressing his tracks to fit into the hardware. Iwata described the project as a challenging one, with his primary concern being to match the game's setting and create an "organic" feeling in the music. Due to the DS's sound limitations, he compared the work on the soundtrack to his time composing for the Super Famicom. The main theme, which formed a leitmotif in several tracks including the main battle theme, was written to represent Aisya.

A two-disc soundtrack album, ASH (Archaic Sealed Heat) Original Soundtrack, was published by Aniplex on October 25, 2007. The album included all the original uncompressed tracks across the first and second discs, then the second disc included the shortened MIDI versions of tracks used in-game.

== Release ==
Sakaguchi confirmed that Mistwalker was working on a DS title in February 2005, with its official title being announced in October of that year. It was the third of four projects announced by the company during 2005 alongside Blue Dragon, Lost Odyssey and Cry On. It was planned as Mistwalker's second released project, coming between Blue Dragon and Lost Odyssey. The title referenced the magical flames sealed away in ancient times. When referring to the game, Sakaguchi asked that it be referred to by its acronym ASH rather than its full title. During its promotion, Sakaguchi revealed that he and the game's publisher Nintendo had discussed the game being the first in a "Team Tactics" series for the DS.

ASH was released in Japan on October 4, 2007. An audio drama by the game's voice cast was published by Aniplex on CD on November 21 of that year. It was also supplemented by two companion books; a Complete Guide published by Enterbrain on December 6, and Setting & Art Book published by SoftBank Creative and featuring character illustrations and developer interviews.

While an ESRB rating for the game was found, and English voice actors were apparently being hired by Nintendo of America, ASH: Archaic Sealed Heat remains exclusive to Japan. Posited reasons include a lack of success in Japan, and the large size of its DS cartridge. In an interview about the Nintendo DSi, associate public relations manager David Young said that the decision not to release ASH outside Japan lay with Nintendo. A fan translation exists, but is noted for its flawed writing. Aisya was later included as a Spirit in Super Smash Bros. Ultimate.

== Reception ==
Reception

Review scores
| Publication | Score |
|---|---|
| Famitsu | 33/40 |
| Hardcore Gamer | 3/5 |
| RPGamer | 2/5 |
| Play Magazine | 7/10 |
| Cubed3 | 6/10 |

During its opening week, ASH reached third place in sales charts, selling 50,000 units. Sales figures were seen as fairly slow given the staff's reputation, in addition to its release on a popular platform during a slow period in the Japanese game release calendar. By the next week, it had dropped to eighth place, selling a further 17,000 units. The low sales apparently led to stores selling the game at half price. By the end of the year, it had sold over 92,800 units, placing it as the 172nd best-selling title of the year according to Media Create.

Torrey Walker of 1Up.com called the game "a memorable DS title for any RPG-lover's library", though noting a lack of accessibility for English speakers. RPGamer's Bryan Boulette noted that the game had its rough edges, but also stood as one of the best tactical RPGs he had played in recent years. The title was later included by 1Up.com on a list of top ten most wanted DS titles in 2008.

Iaian Ross of Hardcore Gamer magazine enjoyed the narrative's dark tone, comparing it positively Final Fantasy narratives from the PlayStation era, but faulted Aisya as a protagonist and the low amount of voice work. Casey Loe of Play Magazine positively noted the narrative's tone, comparing it stories from the era of Final Fantasy IV. Mike Moehnke of RPGamer noted the plot as covering familiar ground for the genre, but said there was enough complexity and interesting twists to keep it from becoming boring. Cubed3's Andy Lavaux enjoyed the narrative for its mixture of different plot elements. Rolando Ochoa of Siliconera gave minimal reference to the plot, but noted its voice acting and CGI elements helped "branch out" the narrative.

Famitsu enjoyed the gameplay due to its depth and amount of player customization, and praised the interface as user-friendly. Ross enjoyed the battle system, but faulted the heavy use of menus and a lack of activities outside the main campaign. Loe enjoyed the battle system, describing it as "quite clever", but faulted the slow and padded feel of battles and disliked the touch-only control scheme. Moehnke enjoyed the basic battle system design, but faulted most of the gameplay's other element as either repetitive or too slow. Ochoa praised the battle system and overall gameplay as the title's strongest element, but found some elements of its controls cumbersome to use. Lavaux enjoyed the battle system concept, but noted a combined lack of challenge and multiple frustrating mechanics caused the game to suffer from pacing issues.

Ross praised the CGI graphics and 3D models, but found the field models and sprites below standards compared to the rest of the graphics. Loe was mixed on the graphics, praising the cutscenes and CGI models in battle, but panning the overworld map and icon design as letting the game down. Moehnke noted the use of CGI and praised the graphics as some of the system's best, but felt the soundtrack was not as memorable as others from the composers. While praising the CGI elements, Ochoa was highly critical of the 2D graphical elements. Lavaux was fairly negative about the graphics, faulting the graphics as blurry and the CGI elements poor compared to other titles within the system's lifetime.
