= Fantasian =

2021 video game

- Fantasian: Neo Dimension artwork featuring the game's cast
- Developer: Mistwalker (Note: Additional work by Arzest. Neo Dimension co-developed with Square Enix Creative Studio III.)
- Publishers: Mistwalker; Square Enix (Neo Dimension)
- Director: Takuto Nakamura
- Producers: Hironobu Sakaguchi; Saho Nishikawa
- Designers: Shunsuke Kobayashi; Masahito Inoue
- Programmer: Takuto Nakamura
- Artists: Jun Ikeda; Takatoshi Goto; Manabu Kusunoki
- Writers: Hironobu Sakaguchi; Atsuhiro Tomioka; Masaru Hatano
- Composer: Nobuo Uematsu
- Engine: Unity
- Platforms: iOS; macOS; tvOS; Neo Dimension; Nintendo Switch; PlayStation 4; PlayStation 5; Windows; Xbox Series X/S
- Release: Part 1; April 1, 2021; Part 2; August 13, 2021; Neo Dimension; December 5, 2024
- Genre: Role-playing
- Mode: Single-player

Fantasian (Note: Japanese: ファンタジアン, Hepburn: Fantajian) is a 2021 role-playing video game developed and published by Mistwalker for Apple devices via the Apple Arcade platform. The game was released in two parts on April 1 and August 13. The story follows Leo, an amnesiac who ends up traveling multiple worlds becoming involved in a conflict between the forces of Order and Chaos. Gameplay has Leo and his party exploring different environments from an overhead perspective, engaging in turn-based combat. A unique mechanic is the "Dimengeon" system, which allows players to temporarily skip fights with some enemies.

Fantasian began development in 2018 after its producer and writer Hironobu Sakaguchi replayed Final Fantasy VI and was reinvigorated to create an emotional role-playing narrative. The staff featured recurring collaborators including artist Manabu Kusunoki, and composer Nobuo Uematsu. Both Sakaguchi and Uematsu approached the game thinking it might be their last large-scale project due to age and health concerns. The environments were created using real-world dioramas, including designs by veterans of the tokusatsu industry. Upon release the game was praised by critics for its combat and environmental design, though several faulted the second part's difficulty.

A version for home consoles and Windows, Fantasian: Neo Dimension, was released on December 5, 2024 by Square Enix. This version comes with high-definition graphics, gameplay adjustments, and voice acting in English and Japanese. Sakaguchi worked with Square Enix on Neo Dimension at the invitation of producer Naoki Yoshida, whose Creative Studio 3 co-developed the port with Mistwalker. Neo Dimension saw positive reviews from critics; praise continued to be given to its presentation and gameplay, opinions varied on its story and difficulty, while the Switch port was noted for technical issues.

== Gameplay ==
Screenshot showing the diorama style used in Fantasian and the HUD that appears during a battle

Fantasian is a role-playing video game in which players take on the role of protagonist Leo and a growing party as they explore multiple locations across several worlds including the land of Vibra. Players can travel between different locations using a world map, while explorable locations include a minimap showing important locations and routes; markers on the minimap can be used to automatically take the party to that point. During the story, visual novel-style sequences called Memories are unlocked, showing parts of character backstories.

Battles, triggered through random encounters, use a turn-based battle system with up to three player party members facing either standard enemies or more powerful boss battles. Attacks and skills have different areas of effect depending on character positioning and weapon type, and can be aimed to strike multiple enemies. After facing an enemy type once, the player has the option of deferring random encounters with using the Dimengeon, a space capable of holding up to thirty enemies. Once the Dimengeon is full, the party must fight the housed enemies, with special bonuses available on the Dimengon battlefield for party members to acquire such as additional turns or damage boosts. Winning battles rewards experience points allowing characters to level up, earning Skill Points which unlock new passive and active abilities.

New mechanics are added in the second half of the game, including a character growth system based around a grid used to unlock abilities using Skill Points; the ability to upgrade weapons and equipment with new skills and attributes; a "Tension" gauge which rises by dealing and taking damage, and unlocks special moves; and the ability to swap one character for another during a turn. The original version supported both touchscreen-based controls, and controller peripherals.

== Synopsis ==
Leo, a young man suffering from amnesia, escapes from a place called the Machine Realm with the help of two robots, Clicker and Prickle. Arriving in the Human Realm Leo begins retracing his steps, recovering pieces of his memories, and seeking a way to repair his travel device. On the way he joins up with Kina, a girl with magical powers, the adventurous princess Cheryl, airship captain Zinikr, and the child inventor Ez. They also encounter Tan, a solitary fugitive. The human world is being infected with "Mechteria", which is associated with a god-like being of chaos called Vam the Malevolent. Vam takes an interest in Leo, whose father was collecting objects of power dubbed Divine Artefacts after Leo's mother was killed by one. Vam created the artifacts to absorb human emotions to counteract "Order", a force opposed to his "Chaos" that threatens to erase all of existence. During their journey, a voice contacts the group insisting they defeat Vam.

Vam captures Kina and Cheryl, who are bound to two Divine Artifacts, and Leo defeats Vam to save them. The voice, a rival god called Jas, reveals his manipulation of Leo's group to defeat Vam and allow order to spread unchecked, triggering the universe's rebirth. Leo, Clicker and Prickle awaken in the near-dead Chaos Realm, and are saved by its sole survivor Valrika. After she reveals Jas's nature, Valrika joins Leo in his quest to reunite his allies and defeat Jas, who is accelerating Mechteria spread across the Human Realm. He saves Ez, Kira and Cheryl from creatures of the Machine Realm, and finds Zinikr trapped in a coma; waking him, he reveals his recovered memories as the god Taros, a former companion of Vam, Jas and the goddess Yim; Yim's death caused Jas to become fatalistic, determined to restart the universe.

Leo helps his companions gather Divine Artifacts to empower their fight against Jas, including reawakening life in the Chaos Realm for Valrika, and recruiting Tan after he fulfils his mission of helping a spirit animal family who saved him from death. The group confront and defeat Jas, who ultimately welcomes death. His death stops the flow of Mechteria and allows the multiverse to find a new balance between Order and Chaos. After returning to the Human Realm, Leo finds evidence that his father traveled to another unknown realm, and he is joined by the rest of the group on his new mission.

== Development ==
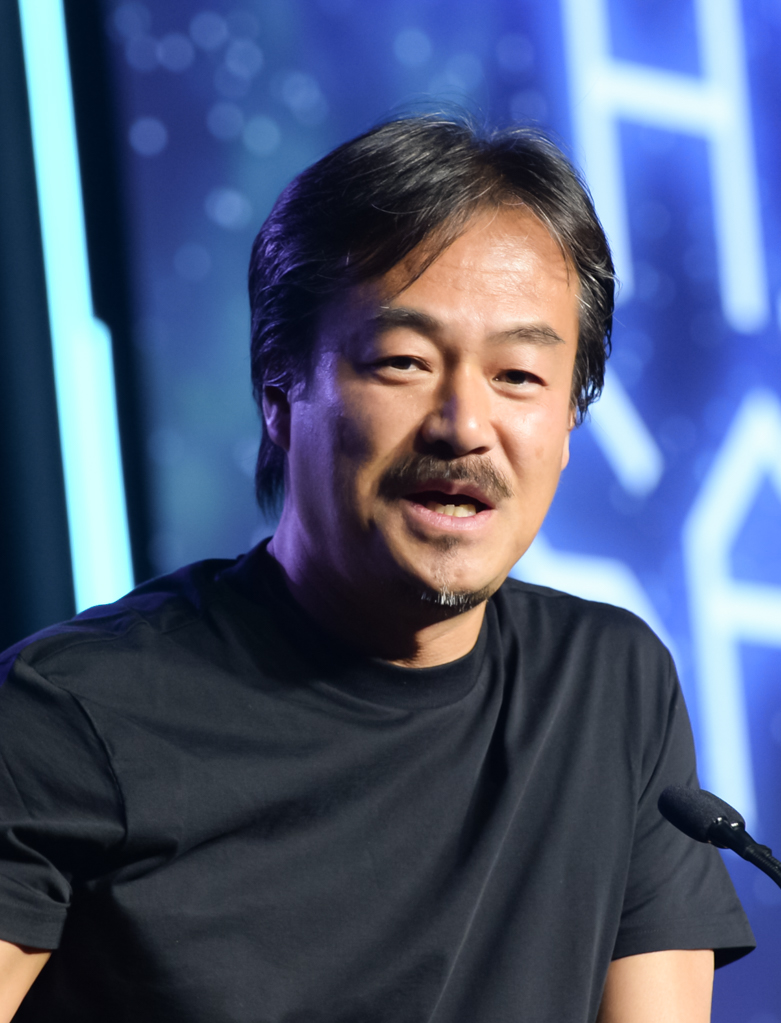
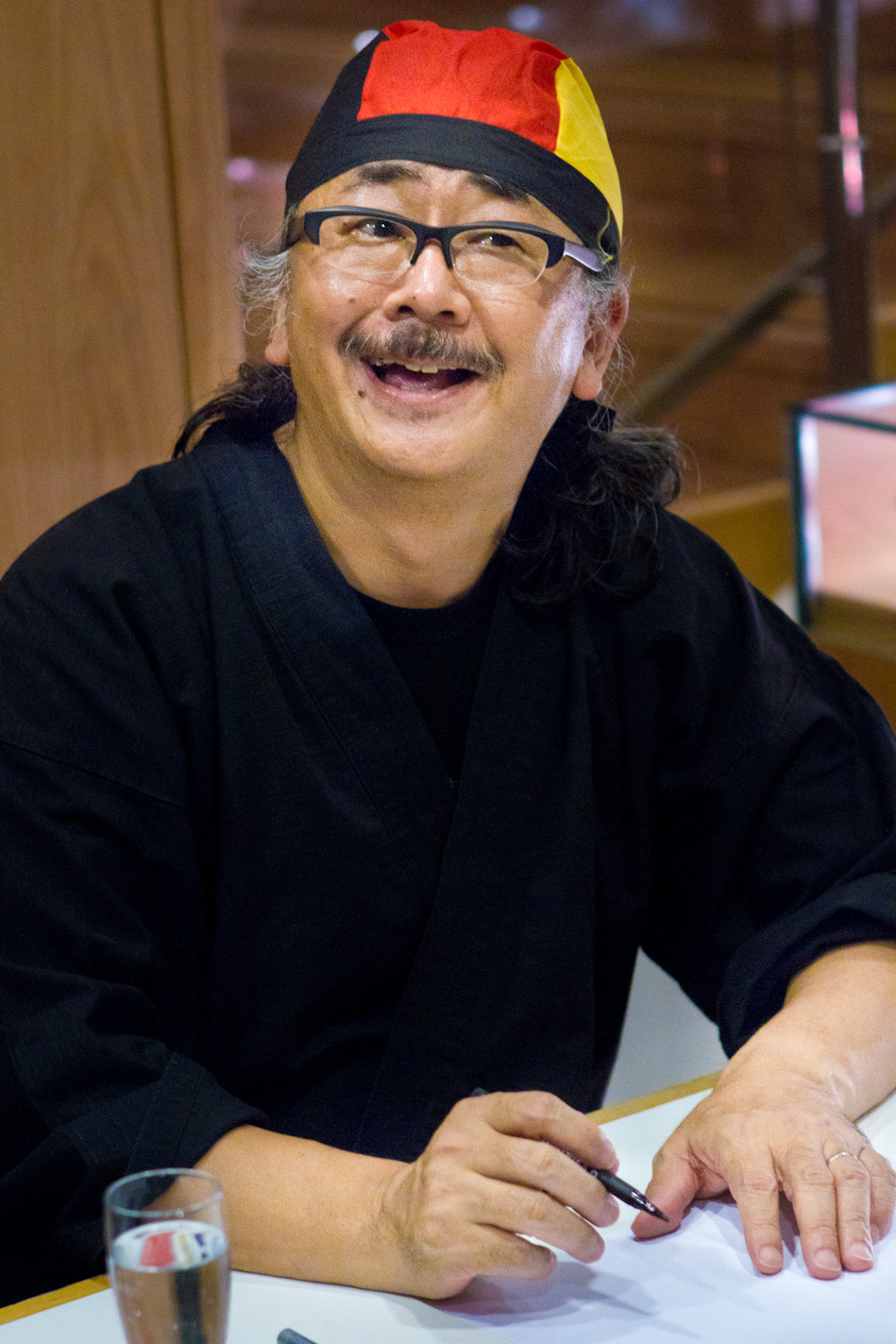
Fantasian was produced and written by Hironobu Sakaguchi (left), with an original score by Nobuo Uematsu (right): both approached the game feeling it would be their last large-scale project due to age and health concerns.

Fantasian was developed by Mistwalker, a Japanese-American video game company founded by Hironobu Sakaguchi, known for his work at Square (later Square Enix) on multiple properties including the Final Fantasy series. In March 2018, Sakaguchi participated in a livestream with fellow developers playing Final Fantasy VI (1994). Reliving those memories, Sakaguchi became inspired to create a traditional RPG modeled on Final Fantasy VI. He was also inspired by Final Fantasy XIV, describing the game as "[honoring] the legacy of earlier Final Fantasy games while also enhancing them". The project was greenlit following meetings with Apple representatives, who were fans of Sakaguchi's work and wanted him to create a title for their upcoming Apple Arcade platform. Production began in June 2018 with Sakaguchi as producer. Other staff included Takuto Nakamura as director and lead programmer, and assistant producer Saho Nishikawa. Arzest assisted development with concept art and character modeling. Due to his advancing age, Sakaguchi approached the game with the mindset that it might be his last large-scale project before retiring from the industry. Outside the game needing to run on Apple operating systems and platforms, Mistwalker was given complete creative freedom.

Production lasted three years with a staff of thirty people, with the team using the Unity game engine. The final year's work was complicated by the COVID-19 pandemic, which required all staff to work remotely. Sakaguchi described it as stressful as they were needing to scale models to environments, but felt there would have been a worst impact if the pandemic had struck during pre-production. The team transitioned to working remotely for the rest of development. The structure, narrative-focused for the first part and quest-driven in the second part, was directly inspired by Final Fantasy VI. This structural shift made it a natural breaking point for the two parts. Apple were also keen to release the game on their platform as soon as possible, encouraging the team to release Fantasian in two parts. The second part, originally planned as a series of short stories for the characters, turned out much larger than planned due to added gameplay content.

The proposal included environments created using real-world diorama models scanned into the game with 3D characters exploring them. This caused difficulties, as while computer environments could be changed quickly, the dioramas could not and so needed to be planned in advance. Battle director Masahito Inoue was left in charge of designing and programming the combat. The gameplay was designed to be traditional, incorporating several elements comparable to Sakaguchi's work on Final Fantasy. He attributed this traditional design to its planned Apple Arcade platform, which hosted games more similar to home consoles than mobile platforms. In the spirit of innovation he remembered from early Final Fantasy titles, Sakaguchi created the Dimengeon system as both a convenience for mobile players, allowing for prolonged exploration and incorporating an innovative battle mechanic. The attack aiming was also designed with touchscreen controls in mind. The denser structure of the second part, with new gameplay elements and an expanded skill system, was attributed to a strong commitment to providing a polished experience inspired by the need to work remotely. Sakaguchi approached the game's design as he did with earlier projects, and described the combat as "skewed heavier on the more difficult and challenging side". In hindsight, he felt that it was too difficult.

=== Scenario and art design ===
Sakaguchi created the story and co-wrote the script with Atsuhiro Tomioka and Masaru Hatano. Sakaguchi drew inspiration for the worldview from Hayakawa Bunko-published science fiction and fantasy he had read during high school. During the early stages, the story was to have focused on dragons. The final story focused on the theme of order versus chaos, with Sakaguchi making Leo an amnesiac — a much-used story device outside Sakaguchi's work — to better introduce players to these abstract themes. He wanted to portray the characters as human at the mercy of universal powers greater than themselves in a world where will and emotion have power, with in-game conflicts reflecting real-world situations. The number of characters was decided during a rewrite after Sakaguchi received feedback from the team on the first draft. The character Valrika was created in response to art director Jun Ikeda's criticism of a lack of female characters. For the Memory sections, Sakaguchi used a similar approach of combining text with illustrations and sound as "A Thousand Years of Dreams", a series of short stories within Lost Odyssey (2007). Shunsuke Kobayashi acted as event designer.

The characters were designed by Takatoshi Goto. Sakaguchi described Goto's designs as doing a good job expression the multiple worlds featured, noting that each lead was given a key color and tied into the story themes. The in-game character models were designed to fit in with the diorama environments, having realistic proportions and a soft doll-like texture. Character animations were done by hand to reinforce this style. The concept art and Memory illustrations were created by Manabu Kusunoki, who had worked with Sakaguchi on multiple projects. Ikeda described working with real-world dioramas as a refreshing change from his usual design work. During pre-production, concept dioramas were created by Walnuts Claywork Studio's Tomohiro Yatsubo, who had worked on similar environments for Terra Wars. A Terra Wars diorama kept in the studio was used for early testing. Due to the design approach, environments were fixed early on, as any changes such as new roads or zone exits would need a lot of work. Due to limitations with camera size and angles, some environment redesigns were needed. Nishikawa was in charge of coordinating the dioramas. The original plan to 3D scan the dioramas into the game proved unworkable, with Nakamura creating an alternate method of extracting 3D information from photographs, with flat environments being more difficult to scan in.

Not counting smaller variations, over 150 dioramas were created by ten companies across Japan, many being veterans of the tokusatsu industry. Several of the modellers had never worked on a video game project before, encountering some difficulties creating objects and environments from the illustrations provided. Yatsubo remembered them modeling their environment "down to the millimeter" to properly reflect Sakaguchi's plan. The Quail airship was created by Marbling Fine Arts's Hiroshi Ihara based on the concept of "a boat with beautiful curves". LED lights were used in the models as light sources, such as interior lights and fires in the Quail. A notable contributor was Akira Toriyama, with whom Sakaguchi had worked on a number of projects, who submitted a diorama under a pseudonym. As the dioramas took shape, Sakaguchi used them to inform his work on the game's design.

=== Music ===
The music for Fantasian was composed by Nobuo Uematsu, who had worked on the Final Fantasy series and a number of Sakaguchi's projects at Mistwalker. Uematsu composed the entire soundtrack himself. The tracks were arranged by Uematsu, Hiroyuki Nakayama, Tsutomu Narita, Kazuhira Degawa, Michio Okamiya, and Yuria Miyazono. At the time he was approached, Uematsu was having health difficulties, and Sakaguchi feared he would not be able to take on the commission. Uematsu described Sakaguchi's approach wooing him into work again. Uematsu eventually accepted, though hinting to Sakaguchi that Fantasian might be his final full game score. He later confirmed this in 2024, calling Fantasian "[his] final project as a composer of video game music", later clarifying he was "cutting back" on his video game work to focus on other types of music.

Sakaguchi originally requested fifty songs, with Uematsu ending up creating nearly sixty, with the main theme taking the longest time to create. While many of his scores had a melancholy tone, Uematsu wrote the score of Fantasian around the theme of hope, inspired by Sakaguchi's scenario. The entire score was completed before the game's first part released, with around thirty songs being exclusive to the second part. The soundtrack had no set genre, allowing Uematsu freedom with his compositions. Rather than a purely orchestral soundtrack, Uematsu composed most of the score for a synthesiser, feeling he could get a broader range of sounds and effects out of that than a standard orchestral. It also gave him greater control over different parts of the music. Wanting to break free of conventional music found in the JRPG genre, Uematsu experimented with elements like dissonance and ethnic instruments. He also incorporated improvised music in the form of a jazz track, something he had never done before.

Choosing battle themes was a struggle as Sakaguchi and other team members liked each one equally. For the final boss, Uematsu decided to write it like a "four-part opera", making Sakaguchi fear they would need to add an extra phase to accommodate the music. The main ending theme "Kina (Destiny)" was performed by Miyazono, with lyrics written by Sakaguchi. One combat song featured vocals by Yasuo Sasai, a veteran of Uematsu 's Earthbound Papas band, and he wrote the song with Sasai's broad vocal range in mind. Additional vocals were performed by the choral group Barzz. Uematsu felt that Fantasian contained some of his personal favorite melodies, while Sakaguchi admitted to crying upon hearing some of the finished tracks.

A physical CD album, Nobuo Uematsu × Hironobu Sakaguchi Works - Music from Fantasian, was released by Dog Ear Records on July 28, 2021. The song titles were kept deliberately simple so people would have an easy time finding them for listening. This release included an additional CD and booklet script for the bonus sound drama "The Tale of Blik-o". Uematsu had previously written "The Tale of Blik-o" for a fan event, and included it in commercial form at Sakaguchi's suggestion. The soundtrack album was released digitally worldwide on August 2, 2021.

== Release ==
Fantasian was announced in March 2019 during a showcase of in-development titles for the Apple Arcade platform. The team were originally aiming for a 2020 release, something Sakaguchi described as naive, and ended up releasing it six months later than planned. Explaining the title Fantasian, Sakaguchi described it as a clear statement of the game's fantasy worldview and portrayal of travel between worlds. The localization was handled by a five-person team spread across Japan and North America including Jessica Chavez, who worked on The Legend of Heroes: Trails in the Sky. Chavez, who had previously worked on Mistwalker's The Last Story (2011), was contacted by a former coworker about the project after starting freelance work and joined the project in 2020. Localization happened parallel to the game's development, with Chavez coordinating with Nishikawa over the details.

The first part was released on April 1, 2021. The game is compatible with iOS, macOS, and tvOS, being playable on associated devices. It was self-published by Mistwalker. The second part was released on August 13. An update in September 2021 to the original release added a post-game superboss, and a New Game Plus option unlocked at a certain point late game, carrying over levels, unlocked skills and equipment into a new playthrough. Following this, Sakaguchi described Fantasian as being complete. Sakaguchi later voiced his wish to both bring the game to other platforms, and develop a sequel.

=== Fantasian: Neo Dimension ===
A high definition port of the game, Fantasian: Neo Dimension, was released in December 2024 for Nintendo Switch, PlayStation 4, PlayStation 5, Xbox Series X/S and Windows, with physical editions made available for PlayStation 5 and Switch. The port was co-developed by Mistwalker and Square Enix, which also acted as publisher worldwide. It was Mistwalker's first title to be released on PlayStation hardware, and its first home console release since The Last Story. It was also the first time Sakaguchi had worked with Square Enix since leaving the company in 2003. Neo Dimension includes enhanced graphics, an easier difficulty option, gameplay balances, and voice acting in English and Japanese. Balancing updates added to the original version post-release were incorporated. It also includes a feature where the battle theme can be changed to ones from selected Final Fantasy titles. A patch released in January 2025 added customisable difficulty options, adjustments to movement, and bug fixes.

While Sakaguchi had previously left Square Enix on poor terms, and had wanted to make a name for himself away from its properties, the situation had softened and he had become a fan and regular player of Final Fantasy XIV. During a dinner with Final Fantasy XIV producer Naoki Yoshida in 2021, Sakaguchi voiced his wish to bring the game to other platforms, and Yoshida offered to have Square Enix publish the title. Yoshida successfully persuaded Square Enix's upper management to greenlight the collaboration, a process Sakaguchi remembered took a long time. Creative Studio 3, which had worked on Final Fantasy XIV and XVI, helped with development. Yoshida did not want to make "unnecessary changes", but both he and Sakaguchi wanted to make it the definitive version of Fantasian. Nakamura was happy at the plan to release the game across a large number of platforms, and worked with Square Enix to adjust the game to work on each platform.

While the original release featured no voice acting, a common feature in Sakaguchi's games, Yoshida pushed for its inclusion in Neo Fantasian due to both fan demand and a wish to increase the story's impact. While major story sequences and important conversations were voiced, smaller exchanges were left silent to conserve the game's pacing. The full-motion cutscenes had to be adjusted to incorporate the voices. For the environments, the team were able to use the original image and scanning data, which was originally compressed so the game could run on mobile devices. Responding to feedback on the game's later sections being too hard, adjustments were made and the new easier difficulty added. The original version's difficulty was retained as a Hard mode. Discussing the difficulty adjustments, Sakaguchi and Yoshida described the new "normal" difficulty as the game's intended balance.

== Reception ==
Original

Aggregate scores
Aggregator	Score
Metacritic	80/100
OpenCritic	81% recommend(Neo Dimension)

Review scores
Publication	Score
Destructoid	8/10
Jeuxvideo.com	17/20
Pocket Gamer	5/5 (Part 1)
RPGFan	92% (Part 1); 82% (Part 2)
TouchArcade	4/5
RPG Site	9/10

Neo Dimension

Aggregate score
Aggregator	Score
Metacritic	(NS) 80/100 (PC) 83/100 (PS5) 81/100 (XSXS) 83/100

Review scores
Publication	Score
Destructoid	8.5/10
Eurogamer	4/5
Famitsu	34/40
Nintendo Life	7/10
PC Gamer (US)	84/100
RPGFan	81%
RPG Site	10/10

Fantasian received "generally favorable reviews" according to review aggregate website Metacritic, earning a score of 80 out of 100 based on 20 journalist reviews. During the 25th Annual D.I.C.E. Awards, the Academy of Interactive Arts & Sciences nominated Fantasian for Mobile Game of the Year. At The Game Awards 2021, Fantasian was nominated in the Best Mobile Game category.

Reviewing the first part of Fantasian, Pocket Gamer's Bryan Taylor positively noted that the game "delivers the classic feel of the RPGs beloved the world-over", praising the elements introduced and looking forward to the second part. Jeuxvideo.com lauded the Dimengon feature as one of the most innovative RPG elements in recent memory, but faulted some parts as slow paced and a lack of language options beyond English and Japanese. Caitlin Argyros of RPGFan gave strong praise to the story, combat and soundtrack, though while lauding the environments found the graphics occasionally blurry. RPGamer's James McFaddon positively compared Fantasian to earlier Final Fantasy games, lauding its presentation and addictive gameplay mechanics. Destructoid's C. J. Anderson called the game one of the best on the Apple Arcade platform, praising most aspects of its design while finding fault in the non-diorama character models and linear progression. Both Anderson and Argyros noted issues during screen transitions when using a standard controller as opposed to touch controls.

Reviewing the second part, Jeuxvideo.com praised the expanded gameplay mechanics and non-linear progression despite repetitive side quests, calling the completed game an essential title for Apple Arcade players. Anderson enjoyed the expanded gameplay elements, including the ability to free rework characters in response to the heightened difficulty, and expanded story elements. McFadden summed up the game as "a fun and engaging game that raises the bar for mobile JRPGs" with the release of the second part, praising its expansion and less linear progression. Argyros was less enthusiastic than other reviewers, enjoying the gameplay expansions but finding the non-linear progression and heightened difficulty detrimental to the story.

Recurring praise was given to the diorama-based environments, combat system and music. The second part was further praised for its expanded mechanics, though its high difficulty was faulted as off-putting after the first half. Reviewing the full release, James Galizio of RPG Site praised the gameplay and art design, and found the story engaging despite the disconnect caused by the difficulty, with his main complaint being recurring technical issues such as freezes and crashes. TouchArcade praised the art design and game mechanics, but felt the story and later difficulty spikes undermined what was otherwise an enjoyable experience.

Neo Dimension has similarly received "generally favorable reviews" according to Metacritic. In an addendum to his review, Galizio lauded the port for fixing the technical and balancing issues present in the original, further praising the added voice acting and awarding the port a perfect score. Steven Mills of Destructoid lauded the game's presentation, narrative and gameplay, with his only notable complaint being elements of its UI showing its origins as a mobile title. Kerry Brunskill of PC Gamer enjoyed the narrative and world design, but felt the gameplay became overly hard and complicated during the second part of the campaign. Ed Nightingale of Eurogamer noted late-game difficulty spikes and found the narrative too conventional, but praised the game as a strong return for Sakaguchi and appreciated having it an accessible form.

Japanese gaming magazine Famitsu praised the gameplay elements and diorama environments, but there were complaints about its traditional structure and longer story segments. RPGFan's Sean Cabot was positive about the Dimengion system and its visuals, but found the story too simple and again noted later difficulty spikes. Nintendo Life's Alana Hagues noted hangover issues with its story and difficulty progression due to the original version's two part structure, but praised the overall gameplay design and presentation. Reviews of the Switch version noted technical issues during exploration.
