= Terra Battle =

2014 video game

- Developer: Mistwalker
- Publisher: Mistwalker
- Director: Koji Ohno
- Producer: Hironobu Sakaguchi
- Designer: Yuki Nishimura
- Programmer: Takuto Nakamura
- Artist: Kimihiko Fujisaka
- Writer: Masaru Hatano
- Composer: Nobuo Uematsu
- Platforms: iOS, Android
- Release: October 9, 2014
- Genre: Role-playing video game
- Modes: Single-player, multiplayer

Terra Battle was a role-playing video game developed by Hawaii-based studio Mistwalker. It was released for iOS and Android devices on October 9, 2014. It was produced by Hironobu Sakaguchi, the creator of the Final Fantasy series, with music by Nobuo Uematsu of the same series. The game also featured artwork by Kimihiko Fujisaka, who has contributed to works such as The Last Story and Drakengard. Service for Terra Battle was discontinued in June 2020.

== Gameplay ==
The game plays as a tile-based tactical role-playing game, with elements of collectible card games and puzzle video games as well.

== Development ==
The earliest reports from the game come from June 2014, when Mistwalker trademarked the name Terra Battle. The game was officially revealed through Famitsu on July 1, 2014. The game was released on iOS and Android on October 9, 2014.

To promote the game, Sakaguchi chose to create a new model of releasing content. Inspired by Kickstarter, he created a means called "Download Starter", where new content would be created based on the number of downloads the game would receive. He enjoyed the fan involvement that came with KickStarter campaigns, but did not like the idea of fans directly financing development. Instead, he chose the "Download Starter" model, which was aimed to create interest in the game after it was already created. At 100,000 downloads, more music from Nobuo Uematsu was created for the game. After the game had been downloaded 1.6 million times, composer Kenji Ito joined the project, with Kingdom Hearts series composer Yoko Shimomura joining him after the game had been downloaded 1.7 million times. To commemorate the milestone of 1,800,000 downloads, a new musical track by famed Chrono series composer Yasunori Mitsuda was added to the game. The final milestone, at two million downloads, would have been releasing a version of the game on consoles. The game's servers were shut down on June 30, 2020.

== Reception ==
Reception

Aggregate score
Aggregator	Score
Metacritic	84/100

Review scores
Publication	Score
Game Informer	8/10
Gamezebo	4.5/5
GameZone	9/10
Jeuxvideo.com	18/20
Pocket Gamer	4/5
TouchArcade	4.5/5

The iOS version received "favorable" reviews according to the review aggregation website Metacritic.

Pocket Gamer described their reaction to the preview build of the game as "cautiously optimistic", stating that the game was "an RPG stripped down to its barest bones, and...it works surprisingly well." while citing concern with the minimal graphics and free to play payment model. Joystiq played a version available to play at PAX Prime 2014, and stated that, while the game was overwhelmingly frantic at first, "the slide-and-move-on action was innate and enjoyable enough to encourage continued play." Game Informer praised the core gameplay, but expressed concern over the long-term effects of the game's imposed waiting time periods.

== Follow-ups ==
In June 2017, Mistwalker announced a sequel and spinoff to the game, respectively titled Terra Battle 2 and Terra Wars, both for Android and for iOS. Terra Battle 2 was released on September 21, 2017, but its lack of success led to it being discontinued, with it being removed from storefronts on June 3, 2018, and its servers shutdown in September 2018.
