= Blue Dragon Plus =

2008 video game

- Developers: feelplus Brownie Brown (Note: Production by Mistwalker.)
- Publishers: JP: AQ Interactive; NA/PAL: UTV Ignition Entertainment
- Director: Takeo Ōin
- Producer: Shinichi Kameoka
- Designer: Makoto Suzuki
- Programmer: Masaki Aikyo
- Artist: Akira Toriyama
- Writer: Hironobu Sakaguchi
- Composer: Nobuo Uematsu
- Series: Blue Dragon
- Platform: Nintendo DS
- Release: JP: September 4, 2008; ITA: February 3, 2009; NA: February 24, 2009; FRA: March 26, 2009; AU: March 27, 2009; UK: April 3, 2009; GER: September 11, 2009
- Genre: Role-playing video game

Blue Dragon Plus (Japanese: ブルードラゴンプラス, Hepburn: Burū Doragon Purasu) is a role-playing video game designed by Mistwalker and developed by feelplus and Brownie Brown. It was published by AQ Interactive in Japan on September 4, 2008, and by UTV Ignition Entertainment on February 24, 2009 in North America under license by Microsoft Game Studios, the intellectual property owners. It is the second of three games in the Blue Dragon series, and the first of two for the Nintendo DS.

== Plot ==
One year after the events of the original game, the world continues to embrace and explore the cube worlds that resulted from the opening of the planet's core. One day King Jibral and Zola encounter a mysterious evil three-headed dragon shadow called Balaur emerging from one of the cubes. Zola has a bad feeling about it and after informing Shu and the party, they find themselves on another adventure to discover this new threat.

== Gameplay ==
Blue Dragon Plus is a real time strategy game. It can be played entirely with the Nintendo DS stylus. Battles initiate once the party comes in contact with the enemy, and the characters can attack automatically. Characters can also engage in Shadow Battles when an enemy with a shadow is encountered. Magic can be used when characters use their skills by summoning their shadows.

== Reception ==
Reception

Aggregate score
Aggregator	Score
Metacritic	69 of 100

Review scores
Publication	Score
Destructoid	6.5 of 10
Famitsu	30 of 40
Game Informer	5.5 of 10
GamePro	4 of 5
GameRevolution	C−
GameSpot	6 of 10
GameZone	8 of 10
IGN	(AU) 8.1 of 10 (US) 8 of 10
Nintendo Life	8 of 10
Nintendo Power	8 of 10
Pocket Gamer	3 of 5
RPGamer	3 of 5
RPGFan	78%
Teletext GameCentral	6 of 10

Blue Dragon Plus received "average" reviews according to the review aggregation website Metacritic. In Japan, Famitsu gave it a score of one eight, two sevens, and one eight for a total of 30 out of 40. IGN Australia gave it a favorable review over a month-and-a-half before its Australian release date.

Blue Dragon Plus entered the Japanese sales charts at number 3, selling about 21,000 units during its debut week. Sales of the game in Japan reached 58,848 units by the end of 2008.
