= Party Wave =

2012 video game

- Developer: Mistwalker
- Publisher: Mistwalker
- Platforms: iOS, Android
- Release: July 20, 2012
- Genre: Puzzle
- Mode: Single-player

Party Wave is a puzzle video game developed and published by Mistwalker for Android and iOS in 2012.

== Reception ==
Reception

Aggregate score
Aggregator	Score
Metacritic	56/100

Review scores
Publication	Score
GamesMaster	81%
Pocket Gamer	2/5
TouchArcade	3/5
Digital Spy	2/5
Metro	3/10

The iOS version received "mixed" reviews according to the review aggregation website Metacritic.
