= The Last Story =

2011 action role-playing game

- European cover art
- Developers: Mistwalker; AQ Interactive
- Publisher: Nintendo: NA: Xseed Games
- Director: Hironobu Sakaguchi
- Producers: Yutaka Takehisa; Hitoshi Yamagami; Takao Nakano
- Designers: Takuya Matsumoto; Tsukasa Tanaka
- Artist: Kimihiko Fujisaka
- Writers: Masaru Hatano; Takatoshi Aoki; Hironobu Sakaguchi
- Composer: Nobuo Uematsu
- Platform: Wii
- Release: JP: January 27, 2011; AU: February 23, 2012; EU: February 24, 2012; NA: August 14, 2012
- Genre: Action role-playing
- Modes: Single-player, multiplayer

The Last Story (Note: Japanese: ラストストーリー, Hepburn: Rasuto Sutōrī) is an action role-playing game developed by Mistwalker and AQ Interactive and published by Nintendo for the Wii. It was released in Japan in January 2011, Europe in February 2012 and North America by Xseed Games in August 2012. The Last Story takes place upon the island fortress of Lazulis, in a world that is slowly being drained of life by an unknown force. The story focuses on a group of mercenaries looking for work on Lazulis; one of their number, Zael, dreams of becoming a knight. After receiving the mystical "Mark of the Outsider", Zael becomes involved with a noblewoman named Calista in an ongoing war between humans and the beast-like Gurak. During gameplay, the player controls Zael as he and the mercenary group to which he belongs undertake missions on Lazulis. Zael can command the rest of the mercenary squad during missions, and fights in battles that involve action, tactical and stealth elements. Multiple online multiplayer modes were also present.

The game was directed and co-written by Hironobu Sakaguchi, the original creator of Final Fantasy, who had the initial idea for the title after seeing the mixed responses to Blue Dragon and Lost Odyssey. Together with designer Takuya Matsumoto, Sakaguchi decided to make a game that would be different from his previous work and most other role-playing games. Development took between three and four years according to different sources. Its story was originally based in science fiction, but at Nintendo's insistence it was changed to be primarily based around fantasy. Among the staff were regular Final Fantasy composer Nobuo Uematsu, and illustrator Kimihiko Fujisaka. It was originally going to be exclusive to Japan, and later its North American release was in doubt after being announced for release in Europe and Australia. During this time, a fan campaign called Operation Rainfall drew considerable attention to the title. The title was a commercial success, and received generally positive reviews worldwide: while the gameplay generally met with praise, opinions varied on the story and graphics.

== Gameplay ==
Player character Zael and his party facing one of the game's bosses

The Last Story is an action role-playing game (ARPG) incorporating elements of tactical and stealth gameplay. The player controls main protagonist Zael for the majority of the game. Zael is primarily controlled using the Wii Remote from a fixed third-person view. The game can be controlled using the Wii Remote and Nunchuk, or the Classic Controller, but does not utilize motion controls. The game's main hub is a public house on Lazulis Island, which also houses a save point for players. Lazulis City is the main setting for most of the game, which provides the player with access to side quests, shops, and areas to collect items when not engaged in the main story. In addition to environments within missions such as ruins and forests where enemies are encountered and fought, there is an arena where the player can improve the party and their combat abilities. If the party is victorious, the party can pick up money and items from non-playable characters betting on the fight.

In battle, the player controls Zael alone, with the rest of the party being controlled by the game's artificial intelligence (AI) and directed by player commands. Parties are composed of up to six characters, each with five "lives", with them automatically reviving after a certain time if Zael cannot revive them manually. The attack directions of both party characters and enemies are represented by lines connecting the different characters. Combat plays out in real-time, with attacks either happening automatically when a character is within range or manually. Actions such as dodging and movement are done manually. Blocking and actions such as vaulting over low obstacles are performed by holding the B button. Zael can also move to take cover behind objects, which allows them to break an enemy's line of sight on them or creep along walls. During combat, a character's Tension gauge will fill, enabling the performance of special moves: these can vary from dealing damage to enemies across a wide area to reviving unconscious allies.

A skill unique to Zael is Gathering: when activated, all enemies within an area will focus their attention on him, allowing other team members to act without interruption. As the game progresses, Zael can issue commands to the other team members, with the perspective switching to a top-down view for this action. In addition to standard combat, players can switch to a behind-the-shoulder perspective for manually firing Zael's crossbow, which can launch a variety of ammunition at enemies and objects. Enemies in Zael's sights will have their weaknesses and abilities revealed. In battle, destructible objects in the environment can be used by the party to defeat enemies; these objects regenerate after a time rather than remaining destroyed. Magic cast by certain characters with that ability leave the casting area temporarily imbued with a spell's elemental properties creating a magic circle. These circles can cause elemental damage or effects to enemies within the area, or they can imbue the weapons of characters who walk into the circle with said element. Eventually, Zael will learn the ability to "diffuse" magic circles which will spread the spell's effect which varies depending on the element.

In addition to the single-player campaign, players could access to online multiplayer through the game's main menu. The multiplayer featured two modes: a competitive mode where players could face each other in various stages, and a co-op mode where a team of players could face bosses from the single-player campaign. For the competitive match, the player had to choose from multiple allied and enemy characters, and all boons granted by equipment or experience levels were removed to level the playing field. Teams of up to six players could be formed for team matches. Players could gain or lose points when they defeated or were defeated by an opponent, and defeated enemies respawned in the battlefield. When all opponents have been defeated, all players were awarded with items and equipment that carried over into the single-player campaign: those who performed the best received higher-quality equipment and "titles" to distinguish them from other players. The co-op battles allowed players to carry over their equipment and character levels from single-player, with the available characters being restricted to Zael's mercenary group. Defeating a boss earned players items themed around it. In both modes, players could communicate using a stock of scripted responses both taken from the single-player campaign and specially created for multiplayer.

== Synopsis ==
The Last Story is set on Lazulis Island, a vast seaborne fortress ruled by Count Arganan and allied to an unnamed human empire in the midst of crisis as the land decays and dies. Dagran, a mercenary, travels to Lazulis in search of employment with the mercenary band he leads: Zael, Syrenne, Yurick, Lowell and Mirania. During the journey, Zael, who dreams of becoming a knight, encounters a mysterious force and is branded on the hand, granting him magical power. While on an errand in town, Zael runs into a woman named Lisa and helps her escape from city guards. Employed as guards to Count Arganan for the wedding of his niece, Lady Calista, to Lord Jirall, Zael encounters Calista and recognizes her as "Lisa". The group also meet General Asthar and his protegee Therius when Syrenne picks a fight with Therius. After Calista explains to Zael in private that hers is an arranged marriage, Lazulis is attacked by the Gurak, a race once banished from Lazulis by humans and now united under their ruler Zangurak. To avoid being killed by the ensuing cannon fire, Zael, Dagran, and Calista stow away on a Gurak ship and eventually take it over. The group are returned to Lazulis by the island's knights. On Lazulis, the mercenaries are accused of aiding the Gurak by the knight Jirall, who is trying to cover up his cowardly behavior during the attack by having anyone who witnessed it imprisoned. Dagran persuades Arganan to release them after showing him Zael's mark, which is revealed to be a mystical "Mark of the Outsider" given to one destined to save Lazulis.

Arganan attempts to get Zael onto his side, offering him knighthood and Calista's hand in marriage. Zael swears allegiance to Arganan, who orders Zael to direct Lazulis towards the Gurak lands. During this time, Asthar accepts Zael as a new pupil and gives him a medal following a successful sparring. Shortly after this, Gurak assassins kill Asthar, who tells Zael the medal is a key before dying. Zael is accused of Asthar's murder by Jirall and imprisoned, but Calista frees him. Dagran suggests Jirall is the real killer, and prompts Zael to search Jirall's room, where he finds the murder weapon and a letter revealing dealings with the Gurak. Jirall is imprisoned, though Dagran admits that the evidence was false despite Jirall's guilt. Lazulis arrives in Gurak lands and takes their keep with minimal resistance. Zael learns there that the Gurak are suffering the same degradation of the land as humans are, which motivated their invasion. Seeing the cruelty of Lazulis's soldiers to Gurak civilians, Zael questions his allegiance to Lazulis. While being comforted by Calista, Zael's brand reacts with Calista's blood and Asthar's medal to reveal a secret location on Lazulis. Joined by Therius, they find a Sorceress's ghost who reveals that the "Outsider" is an extraterrestrial being. At the bidding of her lover, Arganan's ancestor, she summoned the Outsider to the planet in an attempt to end conflict. After realizing that it was draining energy from the land, they split it into two halves in order to slow the land's death. If the two halves, now respectively controlled by humans and the Gurak, are reunited and released, the land's decay will halt and the war will end.

Realizing Arganan's complicity, Zael refuses his knighthood and sets out with Calista to destroy Lazulis' cannon, which is powered by Lazulis' half of the Outsider. When the Gurak attack Lazulis, they are forced to instead help Arganan use the cannon to drive off the attack. The cannon proves insufficient, and Arganan is killed by the Outsider's power. Zael and the mercenaries aid the people while Therius holds off the attacking Gurak. Zael then heads out with Calista and the mercenaries to retrieve Zangurak's half of the Outsider. Zael defeats Jirall, and then Zangurak; during the latter battle, Lowell suffers fatal injuries. The group then find Dagran with the Outsider, claiming he used the mercenaries in his own quest for revenge against the Lazulis knights who killed his family. After absorbing the Outsider's power, Dagran is defeated; he reconciles with the group before dying, then his spirit uses the Outsider's energy to resurrect Lowell. Zael and Calista reunite the two halves of the Outsider, which leaves the planet. Through Zael and Calista's efforts, humans and Gurak manage to begin coexisting, sharing their technology and using Lazulis as a neutral land. In the epilogue, Therius decides to train new knights in the empire while leaving Lazulis in Zael's care; Zael and Calista are married in her ancient family home; the mercenaries hold a wake for Dagran; and Zael is finally made a knight by Calista.

== Development ==
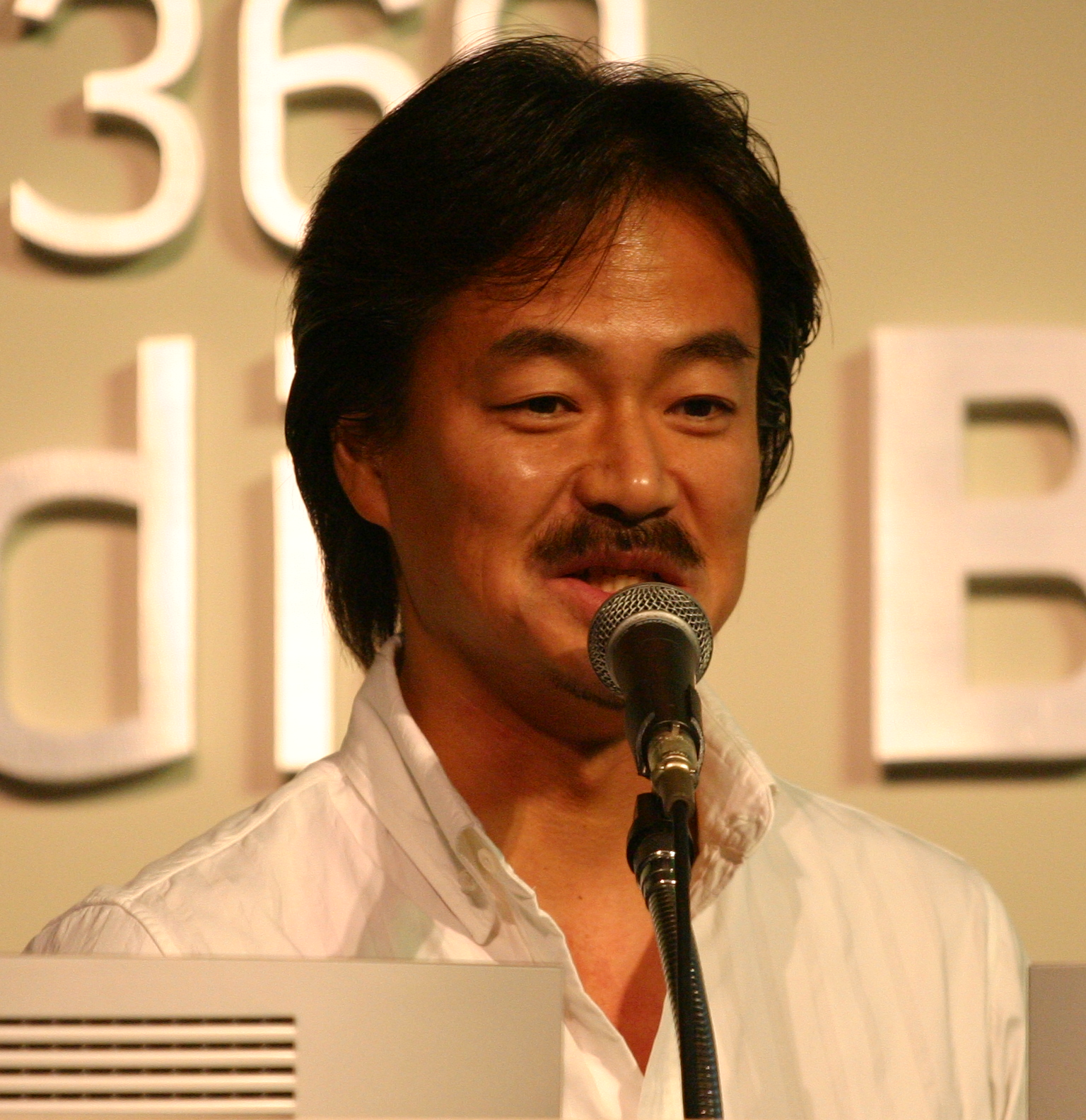
Director, scenario co-designer and co-writer Hironobu Sakaguchi at the 2006 Tokyo Game Show

The initial concepts for The Last Story came to Hironobu Sakaguchi after his departure from Square (now Square Enix) in 2003. After a period working on games at his new studio Mistwalker, Sakaguchi realized that his style of game were not in tune with current gaming trends. Later, he elaborated that The Last Story was primarily born from reflecting on the design mistakes he made during the development of Blue Dragon (2006) and Lost Odyssey (2007): while they tried to innovate with the story, they kept the gameplay very traditional. Sakaguchi drew up a design document for the game, and around that time met up with Takuya Matsumoto, a designer from AQ Interactive who had worked with Sakaguchi on Blue Dragon. They both realized that they held the same views on what was holding their games back in the current market, and decided to collaborate on the game with the goal of creating something new. In an interview with IGN, Sakaguchi said that development took three years: the first year was devoted to a trial-and-error development process devoted to the battle system. A longer development time of four years was reported by Matsumoto in a different interview with Gamasutra. According to Matsumoto, the team leads went to the Electronic Entertainment Expo (E3) each year and were assured that their game was in-step with current gameplay trends. Production of The Last Story was a collaboration between Mistwalker, AQ Interactive and Nintendo, and was Sakaguchi's first work as a director since Final Fantasy V (1992). The game was going through its final development stages by April 2010, and according to Sakaguchi was "complete" by December that year.

Although Sakaguchi's previous RPGs from Mistwalker had been released for the Xbox 360, The Last Story was created exclusively for the Wii. According to Sakaguchi, this was because Nintendo's Shinji Hatano shared their vision of a role-playing game that did not follow genre conversions, and so Sakaguchi accepted his offer of collaboration. After being contacted regarding both The Last Story and fellow Wii ARPG Xenoblade Chronicles, Hatano said that the games should be made for a wide audience and using a "romanticist approach". When explaining why The Last Story was exclusive to the Wii, Sakaguchi said that it was because a large proportion of the late development staff, including the testers, came from Nintendo. In a later interview, he said that working with the Wii, which did not use high-definition graphics, presented challenges as some of his ideas could not be implemented due to technical restrictions. Despite this, the team aimed to create a game that would look good when compared to games on high-definition consoles. Matsumoto stated that Nintendo had a strong influence on the game, which did not always sit well with him despite their suggestions ultimately improving the game. He also said that Nintendo's creative and development aid in fine-tuning the game was the reason for its extended development.

The basic story was conceived by Sakaguchi and Matsumoto, while the script was written by Sakaguchi, Masaru Hatano and Takatoshi Aoki. The story was contributed to by multiple staff members, which sometimes annoyed Sakaguchi when they suggested something that would be out of character for one of the cast. According to Sakaguchi, the initial version featuring a science fiction storyline was "shot down" by Nintendo, forcing the team to begin all over again with a new setting and characters. Despite the story still using science fiction elements, the team worked to distance the setting from those elements by focusing on bright, natural colors for the environments. The biographies of the main cast were put together during the story's creation. Originally, according to Hatano, the game's theme was to have been the "all-important drama that takes place between a man and a woman", but as development progressed it was changed to a theme of general companionship, although the original story remained the same. Hatano suggested incorporating dialogue into the gameplay rather than restricting it to cutscenes. This approach was inspired by both Uncharted and television series The West Wing. The concept was initially put forward as a joke about Zael's habit of kicking doors open, and how his companions would comment on how he always did this. After receiving positive feedback, they implemented it and kept in Zael's behavior. Sakaguchi used this in-game dialogue to help convey the characters' personalities: as part of this, adlibs from the actors were included, and continual adjustments were made to the script. The characters' artwork also prompted Sakaguchi to make changes so the characters better fitted their presentation. The game's voiced dialogue was estimated at 12,000 lines. The option for players to skip through dialogue was a feature that Sakaguchi did not like, but he knew that some players would not like necessary long cutscenes, so gave them the option of going through them while still following the story. This meant that all the cutscenes needed to be done using the in-game engine rather than pre-rendered graphics.

The characters were designed by Kimihiko Fujisaka. Fujisaka, who was acquainted with Sakaguchi, was brought on board the project at the beginning. At that point, only a simple plot outline had been created, and Sakaguchi showed this to Fujisaka and asked what he visualized from it. Due to this, Fujisaka had a lot of leeway in his designs. Due to Sakaguchi living in Hawaii while the game was being developed, Fujisaka was initially nervous about working with him on the project, but ultimately he found their working relationship to be a positive one. An aspect that worried Fujisaka during the early stages was the decision to have the characters able to change their clothing: their original appearances had been designed in relation to their lines, and while designing extra outfits proved difficult, he ultimately enjoyed the experience. Fujisaka also worked as a world designer, initially feeling restricted by the console's limited graphics. Fujisaka said that the city hub began taking shape in 2009, relatively early in development. The world design he initially created was fairly bleak, but after Nintendo insisted on the scenario being changed, he redesigned it around a brighter fantasy aesthetic.

Developing the gameplay began at the start of development, with a test environment being built to develop and refine the basics of the battle system. Work within the test build spanned approximately one and a half years. While creating the battle system, the staff decided that the key words should be "order" and "chaos": whoever gained order on the battlefield would be the victor. One of the concepts that emerged from this was Gathering, Zael's ability to direct all enemies' attention towards him. At first, Gathering ended up generating an unwanted amount of chaos on the battlefield, and this resulted in the trial-and-error period for it running on for a long time. The biggest challenge, once the concept had been finalized, was adjusting its effectiveness on the battlefield depending on the situation and enemy types. A concept that did not make it into the final game was "Replay": after an enemy successfully cast a spell, players could rewatch the last few seconds of battle from an overhead view to see what type it was and take that into their strategy. This slowed the pace of combat down too much, so the concept was entirely removed. Hangovers of it include the ability to freeze time during certain actions, and the overhead perspective when commanding party members. The cover system was designed around the limitations of the camera control born from the Wii Remote's control scheme.

Matsumoto was responsible for the level design. While preparing destructible elements within the environment, the staff took care that they could be easily recognized by the player. So as to create a more direct experience than other Japanese RPGs, the camera view was deliberately restricted around Zael, so the player would be kept within his point of view. A difficult part of development was balancing story and gameplay, which sometimes caused clashes between Sakaguchi and Matsumoto, as Matsumoto would upset the balance and necessitate Sakaguchi re-balancing it. The battle system and AI was refined by what Matsumoto described as "chaotic battles royal between over 20 people wielding swords, magic and guns or ally command systems". The ability to fire projectiles had a big impact on the battle system's design. This concept was a hangover from the game's origins as a science fiction story. For the multiplayer, Sakaguchi avoided the potential for players to be rude to one-another by restricting their dialogue to segments from the single-player campaign. This was possible given the large amount of ambient dialogue in the game.

The game's music was composed by Nobuo Uematsu, a long-time collaborator with Sakaguchi who had worked on the Final Fantasy series, Blue Dragon and Lost Odyssey. Uematsu initially had a rough time: the first three pieces of music he sent were rejected, and then Uematsu did not respond for some time. Sakaguchi worried that Uematsu might quit the project altogether. In fact, Uematsu realized Sakaguchi's wishes for the title and had to rethink his approach entirely. With the second submission, Uematsu stated that he might leave if his music still did not fit, but it did and he remained as composer. In contrast to the majority of his earlier works, which made heavy use of purely melodic pieces and "jogging music", Uematsu concentrated on a mixture between video game and film music to emphasize emotion and ambient sounds. He also worked to avoid creating signature jingles and fanfares. The most difficult pieces for him were battle tracks: the main battle theme was seven minutes long, but broken into small pieces that varied depending on situations and could be cued in depending on what was happening on the battlefield. The game's theme song, "Toberu Mono" (翔べるもの; lit. "The Flying One"), was composed by Uematsu with lyrics by Sakaguchi. Its lyrics are about the world someone is in not being where they are meant to be, with the phrase "going home" being used progressively through the song. According to Sakaguchi, the theme was quite personal for him, and also displays the "foreignness" of the game.

== Release ==
Hironobu Sakaguchi revealed that he was working on a new game in July 2009. Initially targeted for a revealing that year, this was delayed for unknown reasons into 2010. The game was announced by Nintendo in January 2010, alongside its platform and logo. It was released on January 27, 2011. Despite prompting interest from genre fans in the west since its official announcement, shortly before its Japanese release, Nintendo revealed that The Last Story would remain exclusive to Japan. Nintendo explained that the effort involved in bringing The Last Story overseas would be too much work on top of other important releases such as Kirby's Epic Yarn and titles for the Nintendo 3DS. Despite this, Nintendo stated that there was a strong possibility of it releasing in the United Kingdom due to its growing RPG market. The game was officially announced for Europe in June 2011. The European localization was handled by Nintendo of Europe, using the same team that had done Xenoblade Chronicles. British voice actors were used for the dubbing, making use of various accents for the different characters. Some of the original programmers helped with the implementation of the localization, and it underwent unspecified adjustments. The game was released in Europe on February 24, 2012. It received a limited edition, featuring a CD with seven music tracks and an artbook. It was also released in Australia on February 23.

After a continued lack of confirmation of a North American release, including it not being included in Nintendo's 2011 release schedule, a fan-based movement called Operation Rainfall started a campaign to raise awareness for The Last Story, Xenoblade Chronicles, and another Wii RPG titled Pandora's Tower. This campaign included letter writing to Nintendo and petitions for its overseas release. Despite acknowledging the effort, Nintendo stated that there were no plans for a North American release. Matsumoto was severely disappointed by this decision and thought The Last Story would never make it to North America. At this point, Xseed Games, who had developed a reputation for publishing niche Japanese games, took an interest in publishing the title. Initially approaching Nintendo in 2011, Nintendo confirmed that they had no plans to publish the title themselves. After playing through a Japanese copy of the game, the staff were favorably impressed and decided to pitch to Nintendo for the game's North American publishing rights. They were helped by the connections between parent company AQ Interactive and Mistwalker. Xseed Games was the first publisher to ask Nintendo about The Last Story, and after being favorably impressed by their proposal, Nintendo granted Xseed Games publishing rights. While a new localization for North America was considered, it was decided to use Nintendo of Europe's localization as it better fitted the game's atmosphere and aesthetic. It was officially released in North America on August 14, but problems with stock caused Amazon and GameStop to put orders on hold and push their release dates forward.

== Reception ==
=== Critical response ===
Reception

Aggregate scores
Aggregator	Score
GameRankings	78.18% (Note: Based on 38 reviews)
Metacritic	80/100 (61 reviews)

Review scores
Publication	Score
1Up.com	A−
Computer and Video Games	8.5/10
Edge	8/10
Electronic Gaming Monthly	7/10
Eurogamer	7/10
Famitsu	38/40
G4	3/5
Game Informer	6/10
GameSpot	9/10
GameTrailers	8.4/10
IGN	8.5/10
Official Nintendo Magazine	86%
RPGamer	4/5
Nintendo Gamer	85%

The game's story received generally positive reactions from critics, although some criticized it for a lack of originality in the RPG genre. While they did not comment much on the story, Famitsu called The Last Story "very classical RPG". Eurogamer's Martin Robinson found the characters the most appealing part of the game, an opinion shared by Francesco Dagostino of 1UP.com, who particularly cited Syrenne's portrayal. GameSpot's Mark Walton shared this opinion while also praising the story's epic scale. IGN's Keza MacDonald said that it presented a good story and characters within familiar themes and settings. Edge magazine found the story fairly traditional despite a strong cast and emotional power, while Matthew Castle of Computer and Video Games praised the effort made to flesh out the party members in side-missions despite referring to the main narrative as "tedious". GameTrailers, while noting the familiar plotlines the game explored, said that The Last Story handled its plot better than others of its kind, praising its character development. Game Informer's Joe Juba was fairly critical, finding the story overly predictable and the characters shallow. Jason Wishnov of G4 was also critical of the characters and plot, calling the former "one-note" despite convincing camaraderie and well-written in-game dialogue, and the latter impeded by problems with formulaic writing despite some late-game twists. Simon Parkin, writing for Official Nintendo Magazine, found the characters likable despite a predictable story; Nintendo Power shared points of praise with other reviewers, in addition to praising Zael and Calista's romance, saying that it held the game together during some mid-game stumbles. RPGamer's Alex Fuller said that the story was great despite it using well-worn cliches. Multiple critics gave high praise to the British-voiced localization.

The gameplay was generally well received. Famitsu praised the battle system, saying that it was friendly towards casual gamers. MacDonald likewise praised the battle system as "one of the best combat systems I've played with in any RPG, Japanese or otherwise". Walton found the battle system fun and enjoyed the amount of side quests, while Dagostino was highly positive about the game's successful efforts in moving away from genre tradition. Juba enjoyed the multiplayer and praised the game for moving away from the genre's traditional battle systems despite faults with their overall implementation, while Robinson found the gameplay suffered from the design goals that had fueled its creation. Castle was positive about the variety of gameplay and tactical elements despite some stiff combat mechanics, but noted the inability to alter difficulty being a point against the game. Wishnov praised the fast pace and variety of the combat, but found that more cumbersome RPG elements and a lack of overall control negatively impacted the experience. GameTrailers generally praised about the way gameplay and combat was handled despite some "clunky" moments, but was less positive the multiplayer option's balance and variety. Edge, while noting multiple core similarities with other games within the genre, found that other elements came together to make it a more fast-paced cinematic experience than other traditional RPGs; Fuller enjoyed the battle system, but thought that it lacked challenge and had difficulties with the camera. Parkin was generally positive about combat, particularly about the blending and gradual growth of character abilities, while Nintendo Power called the battle system "satisfying" and the multiplayer "surprisingly worthwhile". Multiple reviewers commented on the game's linear structure, with opinions ranging from indifferent to negative.

Opinions on the game's visual style varied. Walton called the game's visuals "some of the best ever seen on the Wii", which was echoed to a degree by MacDonald. Castle was generally positive about the game's aesthetics, citing the water effects as particularly good. Edge was fairly mixed, saying that well-done environmental effects or the world-building through character banter were spoiled by low-quality textures and stilted character animations. Juba praised the character models, but found environments to be "ugly and muddy in comparison"; Fuller, while not actively criticizing them, said that players used to high-definition consoles would be disappointed. GameTrailers found the amount of detail put into environments "remarkable" for the Wii hardware despite a lack of scale, while Parkin found the visuals generally unimpressive despite a few stand-out moments. Nintendo Power said that the graphics gave the game's setting an "authentic" appearance despite some low-resolution textures, while Eurogamer praised them for their "sepia tone". Frame rate drops during moments of high activity were generally noted by reviewers. Uematsu's incidental scoring also received praise from multiple critics.

=== Sales and accolades ===
Upon release, The Last Story topped Japanese gaming charts, selling 114,722 units. Assessments by Media Create stated that while the game had achieved higher sales than Xenoblade Chronicles due to higher interest in the title, Wii hardware sales remained low, indicating that the title was mostly bought by gamers who already owned a Wii console. By the end of 2011, the game sold just over 157,000 units. Upon its release in the UK, it debuted at #15. After the release of The Last Story in North America, Xseed Games released a statement saying that The Last Story was their most successful title to date, with its Premium Edition selling out quickly and needing to be replaced with a different special edition.

Upon its release, the game received critical acclaim, earning an aggregate score of 80/100 on Metacritic based on 61 critic reviews. It was cited by GamesRadar and Forbes as one of the best games of the year. Similarly, 1UP.com named it as one of the top ten best RPGs on the Wii. In addition it was nominated for "Best Wii/Wii U Game" at the 2012 Spike Video Game Awards, and "RPG of the Year" in GameSpot's RPG of the Year award category. In IGN's "Best of 2012" awards, it was awarded as "Best Wii U/Wii Sound".
