= Mistwalker =

American-Japanese video game company

Mistwalker Corporation
- Native name: ミストウォーカーコーポレーション
- Romanized name: Misutowōkā Kōporēshon
- Type: Private
- Industry: Video games
- Genre: Video game developer
- Founded: June 2004; 22 years ago
- Founders: Hironobu Sakaguchi
- Headquarters: 2222 Kalakaua Avenue Suite 1007, Honolulu, Hawaii, United States
- Additional offices: Tokyo Midtown Residences 1307, 9-7-2 Akasaka, Minato-ku, Tokyo, Japan
- Key people: Hironobu Sakaguchi (CEO); Kimihiko Fujisaka
- Products: Blue Dragon; Terra Battle; Lost Odyssey; The Last Story
- Number of employees: 15 (2017)
- Website: www.mistwalkercorp.com

Mistwalker Corporation (Note: Japanese: ミストウォーカー, Hepburn: Misutowōkā) is an American and Japanese video game development studio. The company was founded in 2004 by Hironobu Sakaguchi, best known for creating the Final Fantasy series. The company has created both game franchises such as Blue Dragon and Terra Battle, and standalone titles including Lost Odyssey (2007) and The Last Story (2011). With the financial problems caused by Final Fantasy: The Spirits Within, and his growing dissatisfaction with management, Sakaguchi decided that he wanted to make games outside Square. Mistwalker's first two titles were Xbox 360 RPGs; Blue Dragon (2006) and Lost Odyssey. Following The Last Story for Wii, Sakaguchi and Mistwalker changed to focus on in-house mobile titles. The original Terra Battle saw widespread success and acclaim, leading to further mobile projects.

Mistwalker has been described by Sakaguchi as a collective of artists that oversee projects, with its independent small-scale structure setting it apart from most other Japanese game studios. Sakaguchi has commented that his aim with Mistwalker was to create innovative game titles regardless of platform, rather than staying with home consoles or mobile platforms alone. During its first years, Mistwalker co-developed console titles with other developers including Artoon, Feelplus, and tri-Crescendo. They would also work with Cavia on the cancelled Cry On. Recurring individual collaborators include composer Nobuo Uematsu, and artists Kimihiko Fujisaka and Manabu Kusunoki.

== Origins ==
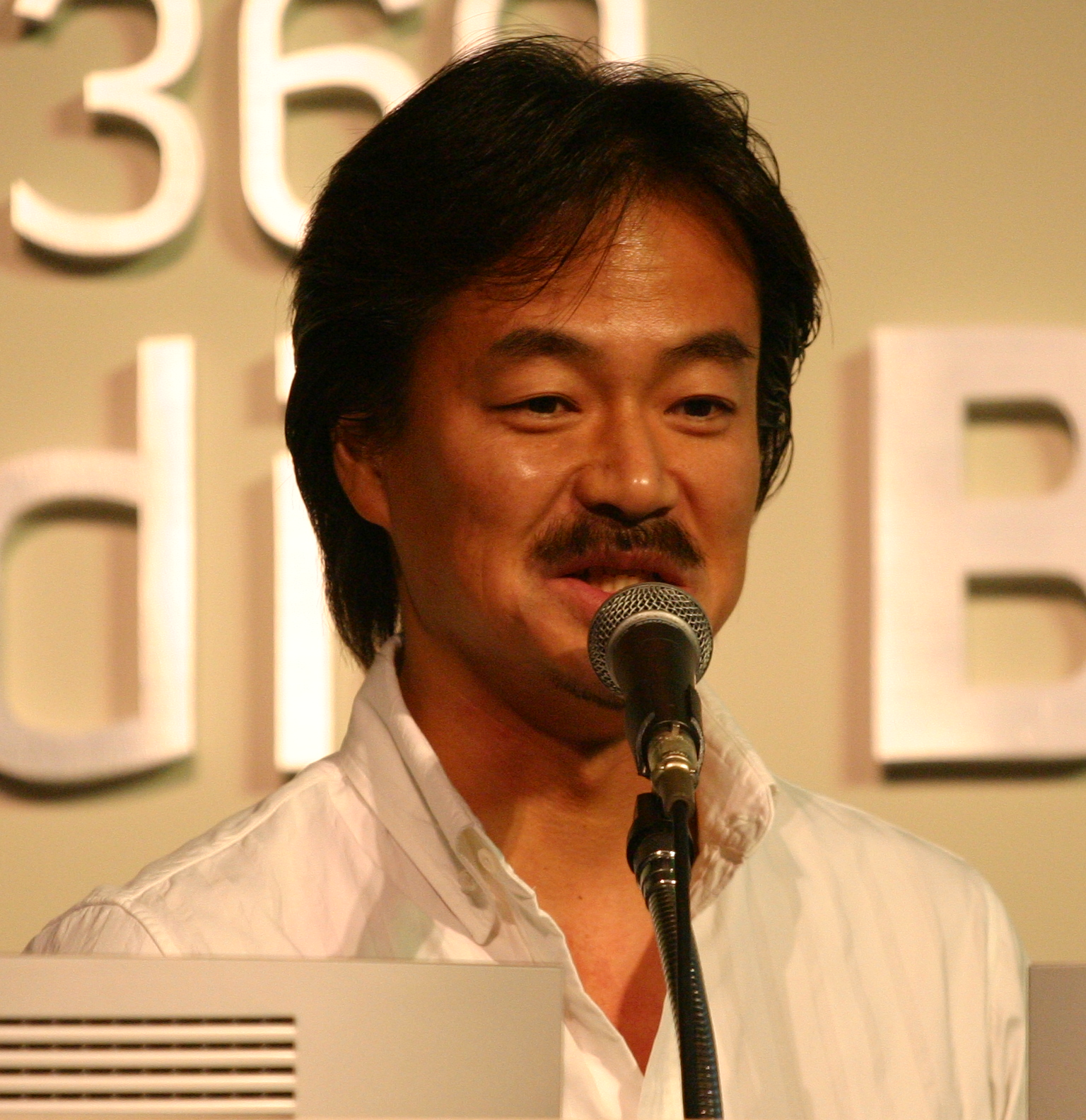
Studio founder Hironobu Sakaguchi at the 2006 Tokyo Game Show

Mistwalker was founded in Honolulu, Hawaii by Hironobu Sakaguchi, who had worked at Square since its formation in 1983. He notably conceived and helped develop the role-playing video game Final Fantasy, which saved the company's finances at the time and began a franchise of the same name. Sakaguchi lost prominence within Square with Final Fantasy: The Spirits Within, a CGI film based on the Final Fantasy property that he directed. A highly ambitious title, it greatly exceeded its budget and was a box office bomb, which damaged Square's finances, delayed their planned merger with Enix, and prompted Sakaguchi to step away from direct involvement with future Square productions. In 2001, with Square in the red for the first time since inception, Sakaguchi resigned from his position at Square along with two other senior executives. His main reason for this was the growing administrative duties he was having to handle in his senior position, something that kept him away from game production. He signed an agreement with Square to act as executive producer for Final Fantasy games.

While Sakaguchi continued to receive credits as executive producer, he described himself as "doing nothing" in Hawaii over the following three years, having been demoralized by the movie's failure. At one point, he felt guilty about his lack of contributions to the industry. Motivated to return to the game industry and create his own original properties, Sakaguchi got into contact with his friends artists Akira Toriyama and Takehiko Inoue about possibly collaborating on game projects. He left Square in 2003, with his last credit with the company being Final Fantasy X-2. Mistwalker was officially formed in July 2004, although its trademark existed as early as 2001. Mistwalker is noted as being one of a group of video game companies—alongside Sacnoth, Love-de-Lic and Monolith Soft—founded by Square staff who had worked on notable games produced during the 1990s. Some of the funds for its foundation came from Microsoft through its Japanese game division. The studio offices are based in Honolulu, Hawaii, and Tokyo, Japan.

== History ==
=== 2004–2011 ===
The concept work for Mistwalker's first two projects, Blue Dragon and Lost Odyssey, began prior to the formation of the company, with Sakaguchi enlisting both Toriyama and Inoue, and contacts within Microsoft Game Studios Japan (MGSJ). Microsoft's Xbox 360 was chosen over the PlayStation 3 due to both difficulties with third-party production and personal disagreements between Sakaguchi and Sony Computer Entertainment leader Ken Kutaragi. Mistwalker's early games for the 360 were notable due to the console's niche status in Japan. Blue Dragon, on which Toriyama collaborated, was a highly traditional RPG intended for genre fans rather than trying anything experimental on the 360, which was a niche console in Japan. For Lost Odyssey, which featured character designs by Inoue, Sakaguchi created a narrative focused on emotion and the impact of conflict through the eyes of an immortal protagonist, collaborating with novelist Kiyoshi Shigematsu on a series of visual novel stories within the game. Also announced in 2005 were two other titles being handled by Mistwalker. They were the Nintendo DS tactical RPG ASH: Archaic Sealed Heat, co-developed with Racjin and drawing from Sakaguchi's work on Final Fantasy Tactics; and the 360 action RPG Cry On co-developed with Cavia, which aimed to evoke strong emotions from players through the connection between its two leads.

Blue Dragon was released in 2006. It went on to spawn a media franchise that included multiple sequels, manga adaptations, and an anime television series. ASH: Archaic Sealed Heat and Lost Odyssey were released in 2007. Cry On was ultimately cancelled by publisher AQ Interactive in 2008, a decision attributed to then-current market conditions. Mistwalker led production on Away: Shuffle Dungeon for the DS, which was released in 2008; Sakaguchi wrote the scenario, while the character designs were handled by Sega veteran Naoto Ohshima. Following his work on Lost Odyssey, Sakaguchi took feedback from both that game and Blue Dragon and decided to create more atypical action-based gameplay alongside continuing storyline innovation. The Last Story for Wii was originally a science fiction-themed game with a dedicated romantic plot, but through Nintendo's input, it shifted to being a fantasy-based storyline with a general theme of companionship. Releasing in 2011, The Last Story was Sakaguchi's first work as a director since Final Fantasy V (1992).

=== 2012–present ===
Following its console collaborations and large-scale RPGs, Sakaguchi wanted to focus on smaller-scale mobile titles it could produce mostly on its own. The choice to shift away from larger console projects was also motivated by Sakaguchi wanting to work with a small hand-picked team. Mistwalker's first solo project was Party Wave, a surfing simulation. The second released mobile title was Blade Guardian, a tower defence title created with several former Square co-workers; Sakaguchi created the game based on his liking for the genre. Party Wave was unsuccessful and prompted Sakaguchi to reevaluate his approach to mobile game development. This led to the production of Terra Battle, a small-scale RPG. Terra Battle was one of several proposals created by Sakaguchi, with one such proposal being a game featuring a ballet dancer.

Terra Battle proved to be a worldwide success, prompting Sakaguchi to expand it into a larger franchise that included a direct sequel Terra Battle 2 co-developed with Silicon Studio, and a spin-off titled Terra Wars, which made use of claymation incorporated into the game. As of 2017, he was also planning out a third mainline Terra Battle title. By 2020, all three Terra Battle titles had been shut down; Terra Battle 2 and Terra Wars were closed due to mixed reactions and trouble updating them based on feedback, while Terra Battle shut down after nearly six years due to growing difficulties keeping the game's quality high. After replaying Final Fantasy VI, Sakaguchi rediscovered an earlier passion for creating emotional narratives. Production began in 2018 on Fantasian, an RPG inspired by Final Fantasy VI and developed for the Apple Arcade service. A notable element was the use of real-life dioramas scanned into the game and used for its environments. An enhanced version, Fantasian: Neo Dimension, was released for consoles and PC by Square Enix in December 2024, making it the first collaboration between Sakaguchi and Square Enix in 21 years.

== Games ==
List of video games developed by Mistwalker
Year	Title	Platform	Co-developer
2006	Blue Dragon	Xbox 360	Artoon
2007	ASH: Archaic Sealed Heat	Nintendo DS	Racjin
2007	Lost Odyssey	Xbox 360	feelplus
2008	Blue Dragon Plus	Nintendo DS	feelplus, Brownie Brown
2008	Away: Shuffle Dungeon	Nintendo DS	Artoon
2009	Blue Dragon: Awakened Shadow	Nintendo DS	tri-Crescendo
2011	The Last Story	Wii	AQ Interactive
2012	Party Wave	Android, iOS	
2012	Blade Guardian	iOS	
2014	Terra Battle	Android, iOS	
2017	Terra Battle 2	Android, iOS	Silicon Studio
2019	Terra Wars	Android, iOS	Arzest
2021	Fantasian	iOS, macOS, tvOS, Nintendo Switch, PlayStation 4, PlayStation 5, Xbox Series X/S, Windows	

== Structure and staff ==
During its early days, rather than developing titles themselves, Mistwalker would oversee production. It would act as a concept studio with a staff of at most twenty people, outsourcing most of development to chosen production partners. The studio was described by Sakaguchi as a collective of elite developers similar to a Hollywood studio. This approach of a concept studio that moves freely between development partners is rare in Japan, where larger corporations and studios with sizeable teams is the norm. Many of the companies Mistwalker worked with would eventually become first subsidiaries of and then be absorbed into AQ Interactive, including Artoon, Feelplus and Cavia.

A notable team member at Mistwalker from 2009 onwards was artist Kimihiko Fujisaka, known for his work on the Drakengard series. In later years, a second artist named Takatoshi Goto would contribute to titles, being described as Fujisaka's protegee. Another recurring artist is Manabu Kusunoki, known for his work on the Panzer Dragoon series. Under Artoon and later Arzest, Kusunoki contributed concept art and in-game illustrations to multiple projects. A recurring musical collaborator is composer Nobuo Uematsu, who also worked on the Final Fantasy series.
