= Lost Odyssey =

2007 video game

- North American cover art
- Developers: Mistwalker; Feelplus (Note: Development support and supervision by Microsoft Game Studios Japan)
- Publisher: Microsoft Game Studios
- Director: Daisuke Fukugawa
- Producer: Takehiro Kaminagayoshi
- Artists: Takamasa Ohsawa; Takehiko Inoue; Hideo Minaba
- Writers: Hironobu Sakaguchi; Kiyoshi Shigematsu
- Composer: Nobuo Uematsu
- Engine: Unreal Engine 3
- Platform: Xbox 360
- Release: JP: December 6, 2007; AU: February 8, 2008; NA: February 12, 2008; EU: February 29, 2008
- Genres: Role-playing, turn-based tactics
- Mode: Single-player

Lost Odyssey (Note: ロストオデッセイ (Japanese: Rosuto Odessei)) is a role-playing video game developed by Mistwalker and Feelplus and published by Microsoft Game Studios for the Xbox 360. Additionally, the game can be purchased from the Xbox digital store and played on Xbox One and Xbox Series consoles through the Xbox backwards compatibility program.

It was released in 2007 in Japan and 2008 in western territories. The story follows Kaim, one of a select group of "immortals" who have lost their memories: while confronting threats generated by the world's approaching magical industrial revolution, he must also face the pain brought by his returning memories. The gameplay features many staples of the genre, such as navigation using a world map, random encounters, and a turn-based battle system.

First discussions surrounding Lost Odyssey began in 2003, with development beginning the following year as an internal Microsoft Game Studios Japan project. After running into difficulties, Feelplus was established as a dedicated studio to work on the game. The story was written by Hironobu Sakaguchi and Japanese author Kiyoshi Shigematsu: Sakaguchi wanted to create a story focusing on evoking human emotions, and kept the gameplay within genre traditions so he could experiment with the story. The game went through a difficult development, with problems stemming from the chosen engine technology and the arrangement of development teams. The music was composed by Nobuo Uematsu, a veteran composer for the Final Fantasy series.

First hinted at in 2005, the game was officially revealed shortly before that year's Electronic Entertainment Expo. At the time it was released, it was Microsoft's largest console game, spanning four dual-layer DVDs. Upon its debut in Japan, it sold favourably, eventually selling nearly 110,000 units by April 2010. It also received strong sales overseas. Its critical reception has been generally positive: while praise has focused on its story, many journalists were critical of its traditional design and loading times.

== Gameplay ==
A standard battle from Lost Odyssey, showing main protagonist Kaim performing an attack with the "Aim Ring System" active

Lost Odyssey uses a traditional turn-based battle system seen in most Japanese role-playing games, similar to early Final Fantasy iterations. A world map allows the player to move the party between adjacent towns or fields on the map, while later in the game the player is given more freedom to explore the world through the use of ocean-going ships. Towns and cities provide inns for the player to read the thousand years of dreams, Mana/HP recovery orb for health and mana, stores for buying and selling of equipment, and save points for the game. While exploring certain areas, the player will randomly encounter monsters to fight.

The combat system incorporates aspects of battle initiative and length of actions to determine how events resolve each turn. Item usage is instantaneous, regular melee attacks are executed on the same turn, while casting spells or using special abilities may delay the player's action for one or more turns, depending on their speed. Actions can be delayed if the user is hit by an attack. The player has the option to cancel an action on a subsequent turn if necessary.

Melee attacks include an "Aim Ring System" using equippable rings with added effects. As the character launches the attack, two concentric targeting rings appear on screen. The player must time their button release in order to make the rings intersect. An accuracy rank ("Perfect", "Good" or "Bad") indicates the potency of the effect. These include additional damage specific to certain types of monsters or their magic element, hit point or mana absorption, status ailments, or being able to steal items. Even if awarded a "Perfect", the character can still miss the attack altogether. These rings are created by synthesizing "components", and can be upgraded into more accurate, or more potent versions; advanced rings can be made by combining two or more rings at a special vendor.

In combat, both the player's party and enemies are arranged in two lines, front or back. Up to five party members can participate in battle at once. At the start of battle, the back line is protected by a special defensive "wall" which is based on the combined hit points of the front line. This wall reduces damage that the characters in the back experience, but as the front line takes damage, the wall weakens, and can only be recovered through the use of certain spells or skills.

There are two types of characters that the player controls. "Mortals" gain skills by leveling up, but can benefit from additional skills by equipping accessories. "Immortals" do not know any skills initially, but instead gain skills by "linking" with a mortal character that is currently part of the battle formation, earning skill points in battle towards complete learning of the skill. Immortals can also learn skills from accessories by equipping them in the same manner, much like the ability point system of Final Fantasy IX. Once a skill is learned, the player can then assign these skills to a limited number of skill slots, initially starting at three but able to be expanded via "Slot Seed" items or certain skills. Immortals also have the ability to automatically revive in battle should they lose all their hit points; if the entire party is downed, including the immortals, the game will be over.

The game's magic system is based on four classes of magic: Black, consisting primarily of elemental attacks and negative status effects; White, mainly for healing and protection; Spirit, for stat changes, status ailments and non-elemental magic; and Composite, which can combine two spells, once learned, into multi-target or multi-function spells. To cast spells, the player must first find spells to fill the spell book, and then must have characters that have learned the appropriate magic skill of the right level to cast that spell.

== Synopsis ==
=== Setting ===
Lost Odyssey is set in a world in which a "Magic-Industrial Revolution" is taking place. While magic energy existed in all living creatures beforehand, it suddenly became far more powerful thirty years before the beginning of the game. Because of this, it has affected society greatly, with devices called "Magic Engines" harnessing this power for lighting, automobiles, communication, and robots, among other uses. While previously only a select few could wield magic, many magicians gained the ability, but such progress has also caused two nations to develop new and more powerful weapons of mass destruction: the kingdom of Gohtza and the Republic of Uhra (which recently converted from a monarchy). Uhra is building Grand Staff, a gigantic magic engine, while the heavily industrialized Gohtza actively pursues magic research of their own. A third nation, the Free Ocean State of Numara, remains isolated and neutral, though it is falling into disarray due to a general attempting to stage a coup d'etat. Uhra, at war with Khent, a nation of beastmen, sends its forces to the Highlands of Wohl for a decisive battle at the start of the game.

=== Plot ===
After a meteor wipes out the majority of forces from the nations of Uhra and Khent, Kaim joins Seth and Jansen to investigate the Grand Staff at the behest of the council of Uhra. At the Staff, the three are captured by hostile scouts who take them to Numara, where they meet with Queen Ming, another immortal who has lost her memory. The queen allows the group to go free in Numara, where Kaim meets Cooke and Mack, his grandchildren, who join the group after the death of their mother.

News eventually arrives in Numara that Gongora has encouraged Tolten to reestablish the monarchy in Uhra and prepare for war. The general of Numara, Kakanas, uses the opportunity to usurp control of the country from Ming, forcing her to flee with Kaim and others as enemies of the state. The group travels towards the nation of Gohtza, hoping to seek help from its King. On the way, Sarah Sisulart, Kaim's wife, joins the party after she is recovered from the Old Sorceress Mansion.

Arriving in Gohtza, Kaim and Sarah arrange for a peace negotiation between the Gohtzan King, Queen Ming, and Tolten to take place on a train. However, Kaim and Sarah are forced to go after Cooke and Mack, who steal a train to again try to find the spirit of their departed mother, leaving Jansen and Seth to participate in the negotiation alone. During the meeting, Gongora activates Grand Staff and flash freezes the entire country. Kaim and Sarah locate Cooke and Mack but are forced to separate due to a vicious magic attack by Gongora. Kaim and Sarah's train crashes, while Cooke and Mack are stranded on the train tracks in the freezing cold. The children are later saved by Ming and Jansen. The four unite and rescue Kaim and Sarah. In Uhra, Tolten learns that Gongora has announced Tolten's death and has usurped the throne, thus he joins with Seth to help free her son Sed, who joins the party, and his pirate hydrofoil submarine, the Nautilus. The entire party reconvenes in Gohtza.

The immortals talk and begin to recover their memories, realizing that they are actually observers from a parallel universe. In Gongora's diary, he explains the difference in space-time, where 1000 years is equivalent to 1 year in the parallel universe. The diary also explains that the immortals' world has been affected by the emotions of people in the mortal realm.

After regaining their memories, the party heads for Grand Staff. They recognize that Gongora is attempting to use the Grand Staff to destroy the portal between the two worlds, killing the other immortals and making himself effectively invincible. The group confronts Gongora in the Hall of Mirrors, the only place where they are vulnerable to death. The mortals help to block the mirror's power while the immortals fight Gongora, but their powers are equally matched. When the mortals become trapped in their own barrier after absorbing too much power, Seth drags Gongora through the mirror, allowing Kaim to break it and prevent him from ever returning.

In the epilogue, the nations led by Ming and Tolten come together to rebuild society, and the monarchy is restored in Uhra. Ming and Jansen get married, while Kaim and Sarah settle down to help raise Cooke and Mack, all aware that Seth is able to observe their happy endings.

== Development ==
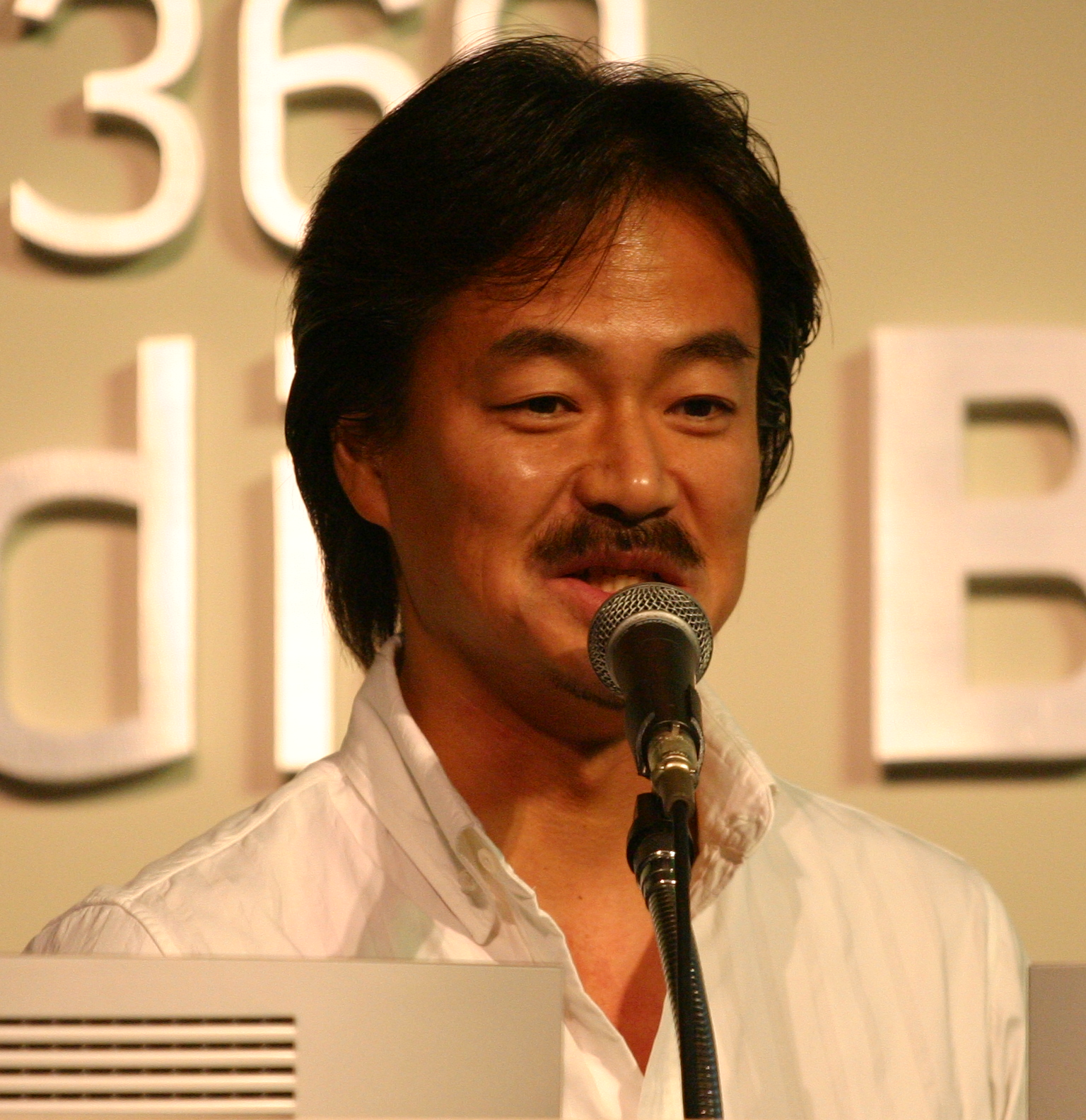
Scenario writer and project supervisor Hironobu Sakaguchi at the 2006 Tokyo Game Show

The development of Lost Odyssey was first proposed to Microsoft Game Studios by Final Fantasy creator Hironobu Sakaguchi. The first discussions began in 2003. It was a collaboration between Mistwalker, an independent game studio set up by Sakaguchi in 2004, and Microsoft. It was initially an internal project by Microsoft's Japanese studio with Sakaguchi, but development ran into difficulties. The video game company Feelplus, which formed one part of AQ Interactive was brought in to assist with the game's development. The staff of Feelplus included a large number of developers from the defunct Shadow Hearts developer Nautilus, and staff members from The Legend of Dragoon and Phantom Dust. Among the shared staff were art director Takamasa Ohsawa. They also included developers from Microsoft Game Studios Japan and Sega. Further freelance staff were also brought in. Development started in 2004 and lasted three and a half years. Mistwalker handled the story, world building and character design, Feelplus developed the actual product, while Microsoft Japan provided funding, project management, production and testing. While development started with ten people, at development's peak it was at 150. The game's respective director and technical director, Daisuke Fukugawa and Katsuhisa Higuchi, had previously worked at Square Enix. Sakaguchi was fairly closely involved during the initial development, but during later phases he took a more hands-off supervisory approach.

The game's story was written by Sakaguchi, whose main aim was to create a highly emotional experience that explored the human psyche. According to him, the game's setting revolved around conflict and its effects. In addition to Sakaguchi's work, Japanese novelist Kiyoshi Shigematsu created over thirty stories detailing Kaim's life as an immortal, titled "A Thousand Years of Dreams". According to Shigematsu, it was the first time he had ever worked on a video game, and was unsure about whether he could evoke emotion as he did in his books. In the end, he found that the interactive medium gave his work a new impact that moved him to tears upon seeing it in place. These story segments were presented in the game in a similar style to a visual novel, as the stories were intended to evoke emotion. The gameplay, such as the battle system, was kept deliberately traditional so that Sakaguchi had freedom to experiment with the story. Despite this, he wanted to introduce new real-time elements into the system. One of the elements Sakaguchi checked was how story and gameplay were balanced: sometimes, he would ask for a cutscene to be removed or for a boss battle to be lengthened if the balance seemed off.

The music was composed and produced by Nobuo Uematsu at his studio Smile Please, who worked with Sakaguchi on the Final Fantasy series. Arrangements were done by Satoshi Henmi and Hiroyuki Nakayama. Uematsu was contracted to Mistwalker to work on three of their games, with the first being Blue Dragon. He was highly excited for the title as it was Sakaguchi's first "serious" game since leaving Square Enix in 2003. As he was involved with Lost Odyssey from the early stages, receiving information on the characters and setting, he was able to create his first musical pieces while the game was in early stages. Most of the two hours worth of music was recorded with a live orchestra, as Uematsu felt that the emotion evoked by the game could only be communicated through live instruments. As with his previous work, Uematsu's music covered a lot of ground: the musical style varied from grand orchestral pieces, to hardcore rock, to ambient electronic music. In addition, he used unusual ethnic instruments to introduce unconventional sounds, including a sitar and a shakuhachi. The main theme was written in a minor key to express the burden of living for over a millennium: it was incorporated into the score in various forms. Two of the songs in the game, "What You Are" and "Eclipse of Time", were sung by award-winning vocalist Sheena Easton. The vocal track "Kaette Kuru, Kitto..." was sung by Japanese band Flip Flap. The lyrics for all the songs were written by Sakaguchi.

=== Design ===
For the development, the staff split up into multiple teams that handled different segments of game development: one group was responsible for the game's build, another was responsible for the database system and AI, while another was in charge of level design. The game design went smoothly as the game's staff were used to the genre, but other aspects did not: development began without access to the Xbox 360 hardware, and starting development with a large staff caused aspects to be changed upon the console's release. The three separate teams that created battle, adventure, and cutscene components ran into "various issues" while combining their work, causing company president Ray Nakazato to consider "seamless" development for any later projects. Little-used parts of the environment were given an extensive level of detail, resulting in a waste of money and time, and concept art was given the same extensive level of attention. Microsoft's milestone-based development schedule was seen as a boon to the development, as every three months the team needed to produce acceptable results for Microsoft. Conversely, the high number of staff led to a prolonged feeling of disconnection between developers. According to Sakaguchi, the team was on the point of collapse by the middle of development, but they pulled through.

The game used Unreal Engine 3 as middleware due to it being at the forefront of engine technology at the time. It also allowed development to start before the console's release. Conversely, the design philosophy behind Unreal Engine clashed with the philosophies most often used in JRPG engines, resulting in difficulties with integration that repeated themselves four times during development. In addition, the team had trouble keeping up with the engine's regular updates and reading the requisite manuals. This in turn caused technical setbacks such as long loading times. Four different types of cutscenes were created, from lower-quality real-time cutscenes to pre-rendered cinematics. In hindsight, it was felt that the pre-rendered cinematics were not needed as they used the same models as the high-quality real-time cutscenes, although during development pre-rendered cutscenes were chosen due to their improved lighting and visual effects. The different grades of cutscenes were created differently: higher-quality real-time cutscenes were first shot and then tailored motion capture animations were included with hand-manipulated facial expressions, while the lower-quality cutscenes used "off-the-shelf" motion capture. Due to a lack of a clear transition point, players later felt that cutscene quality was inconsistent. The amount of higher-quality cutscenes was much higher in earlier builds of the game, and the team needed to reduce their number and replace them with standard real-time cutscenes. The final length of cutscenes was estimated at around seven hours: one hour used pre-rendered graphics despite real-time high-quality character models being used, while six hours were purely real-time. The game's visual director was Roy Sato, who had a previous background in film and television and had worked with Sakaguchi on Final Fantasy: The Spirits Within. Working on the game was initially difficult, as he needed to adjust to a new format and get used to a company that was still fairly new.

The main characters were designed by Takehiko Inoue, a noted manga artist who had developed a reputation for designing "people". Inoue made the initial character designs based on the material provided by Sakaguchi, then submitted them and adjusted them based on Sakaguchi's feedback. Characters sometimes needed to be completely redesigned, such as Tolten. The main characters' clothing was designed by Final Fantasy artist Hideo Minaba: the clothing was designed not to reflect any nationality or historical era. While they tried not to limit the designers' creative abilities within the game's hardware, Minaba was asked to limit fluffy or swinging clothing. The character models were hard to create, especially considering the surrounding environments. In contrast, the use of Unreal Engine 3 lessened the technical restrictions on the team. Inoue ran frequent checks on the character models as they went through multiple revisions, even down to their eyebrows. It was estimated that three hundred unique characters were created for the game. The game's concept artwork was worked on by Christian Lorenz Scheurer, who had previously worked on Final Fantasy IX, along with film projects such as The Fifth Element.

== Release ==
Mistwalker confirmed in February 2005 that it was working on two RPGs for the then-untitled Xbox 360. Lost Odyssey was officially revealed during a pre-Electronic Entertainment Expo (E3) conference. The game's content was large enough that it was shipped on four dual-layer DVD discs: this was one more than Mistwalker's other Xbox 360 RPG Blue Dragon, and at the time made it Microsoft's largest console game. A demo for Japan was released in 2006, featuring a basic build of its battle system. In hindsight, a demo release this early was seen as a mistake as it gave players a negative impression of the battle system. Microsoft initially had high hopes for the title and so had high sales forecasts, but after the Xbox 360 met with poor sales in Japan, they significantly reduced their forecast.

Lost Odyssey was added to the Xbox One backwards compatibility list in September 2016. The game was made available digitally on December 14 and was a free download to all Xbox Live members until December 31.

=== Localization ===
The game was localized into multiple languages, but all the lip syncing was for the English dialogue: this was done partly to show western audiences appreciation for their support of the title, and also because Japanese audiences had grown used to out-of-sync dialogue with dubbed Western films. English voice recording was done in Los Angeles. Localization was handled by Microsoft: initially, different departments in each region handled localization for their region. The need to translate and then include the material at long distance proved problematic, so the main development team brought the localization team into the main production, introducing them to easy-to-use development tools so changes could be made easily without direct consultation with Feelplus. The story segments written by Shigematsu were translated by Jay Rubin, a noted American academic and translator from Harvard University noted for translating the works of Haruki Murakami. Microsoft chose Rubin as they wanted Shigematsu's material treated and translated with the utmost respect possible. When first approached, Rubin was skeptical, as he did not want to work in a medium that generally seemed to glorify violence, but eventually agreed to have a look at the material, and was shocked by the anti-violence message present throughout all the stories while remaining family-friendly. He referred to the messages within Shigematsu's stories as "essentially Buddhistic", and was surprised that Microsoft had contacted him in the first place given the stories' visual novel medium within the context of Lost Odyssey.

=== Downloadable content ===
Downloadable content (DLC) for the game began release in Japan in January 2010: the content consisted of multiple additional chapters in "A Thousand Years of Dreams", powerful accessories, and an option to view cutscenes. The final DLC package included a late-game underwater dungeon. The DLC content received overseas releases between April and May 2008, but the first one was limited to a pre-order exclusive in North America.

=== Novel ===
On November 21, 2007 a book of short stories based on the main character of Kaim was released in Japan called He Who Journeys Eternity: Lost Odyssey: A Thousand Years of Dreams (永遠を旅する者 ロストオデッセイ 千年の夢, Towa o tabisuru mono Rosuto Odessei sennen no yume). It is penned by Kiyoshi Shigematsu and features 31 out of the 33 stories found in the "A Thousand Years of Dreams" sequences throughout the game itself.

== Reception ==
Reception

Aggregate score
Aggregator	Score
Metacritic	78/100

Review scores
Publication	Score
1Up.com	B+
Destructoid	9/10
Edge	7/10
Eurogamer	8/10
Famitsu	36/40
Game Informer	8.5/10
GameRevolution	B
GameSpot	7.5/10
GameSpy	2.5/5
GameTrailers	8.8/10
GameZone	8.5/10
IGN	8.2/10
PALGN	8/10
TeamXbox	8.3/10
X-Play	3/5

=== Sales ===
Lost Odyssey reportedly sold 40,000 copies in Japan on its first day at retail, around 50% of the shipment. As of February 2008, the game has sold 104,417 copies in Japan according to Famitsu numbers. Its sales figures impressed Microsoft enough that they were considering turning Lost Odyssey into a series. As of April 2010, the game has sold 109,517 units in Japan, becoming the ninth best-selling game for the platform. The game has done much better in the West; according to NPD numbers Lost Odyssey debuted at #7, selling 203,000 in its debut month of February in North America. At its UK debut, it debuted at #6 in the gaming charts.

=== Reviews ===
Famitsu awarded the game a score of 36/40, with all four critics each giving the game a 9.

On Metacritic, the game received a score of 78/100, indicating "generally favorable reviews".

The issue many took with Lost Odyssey was its deliberately old-school gameplay mechanics, particularly the traditional combat system, which several critics found to be dull and dated, as well as the game's use of random battles, which were further deemed an issue by their purportedly lengthy load times. Xbox Focus gave the game a 4/5 rating, declaring its story as profound, but taking an issue with the camera control and the odd character design. Unlike other critics, however, Xbox Focus's Alex Yusupov deemed the combat and random battles as exhilarating, and that "it's better to take a tried and true technique and make it better than introduce a completely new idea that could possibly screw up an entire game". IGN found that the ring-building system, immortals, and skill system added a fresh feel to the game's otherwise traditional combat, and 1UP.com praised the "timed button press" aspect of the battles, saying it makes them more engaging than the players would think.

While the visual novel flashback sequences, penned by Kiyoshi Shigematsu, were widely acclaimed, critics were divided on the main story itself. RPGFan stated that the story and gameplay were both "overused, uninspired, and stilted", but that the memory sequences penned by Shigematsu were "some of the richest, most emotionally charged storytelling seen in any RPG to date". GameSpot praised Lost Odyssey's "fascinating cast", character development, and "great plot", and also called the combat system "solid". The reviewer also described the flashbacks as "well written and emotionally gripping". GameSpy called the main plot and characters as "shamelessly derivative". GamePro magazine agreed, declaring that the main story was not particularly compelling, although it noted that many subplots carried plenty of emotional weight. On the other hand, Game Informer magazine deemed the story line as being "one of the most compelling tales ever told on the Xbox 360", and praised the "cool combat system". GameTrailers said, "what sets Lost Odyssey apart is a deeply moving story that places an emotional focal point on its characters".

Despite critics' differing opinions in other areas, the game's graphics and high production values have received acclaim, although load times and framerate issues were also pointed out. However, it transpired that the copy that some reviewers received apparently had longer loading times than those of the retail version. GameSpot amended their review on February 19, 2008 to reflect this, but did not change their original score.
