= Blue Dragon (video game) =

2006 video game

- Developers: Mistwalker; Artoon (Note: Development support and supervision by Microsoft Game Studios Japan.)
- Publisher: Microsoft Game Studios
- Director: Takuya Matsumoto
- Programmer: Shinji Iseki
- Artists: Akira Toriyama; Yoshihito Takahashi
- Writers: Hironobu Sakaguchi; Atsuhiro Tomioka
- Composer: Nobuo Uematsu
- Series: Blue Dragon
- Platform: Xbox 360
- Release: JP: December 7, 2006; EU: August 24, 2007; NA: August 28, 2007; AU: August 30, 2007
- Genre: Role-playing
- Mode: Single-player

Blue Dragon (Note: Japanese: ブルードラゴン, Hepburn: Burū Doragon) is a role-playing video game developed by Mistwalker and Artoon in collaboration with Microsoft Game Studios Japan and published by Microsoft Game Studios for the Xbox 360. It is based on a design by Final Fantasy series creator Hironobu Sakaguchi, who also supervised development and wrote the plot. It is both Mistwalker's debut title and the first title to be helmed by Sakaguchi outside of Square Enix. Taking place in a fictional open-world environment, the story focuses on five friends empowered by mysterious shadow creatures as they travel across the world to confront an evil king who seeks global conquest. The game follows a traditional role-playing design, based around exploration and turn-based combat.

Blue Dragon was the first Xbox 360 title to make use of multiple discs, spanning three discs in total. The game was released in Japan in December 2006, where it was sold both as a standalone title and as part of a bundle with the Xbox 360. Other regions received only the game itself, with a release in August 2007. Overall, the game received a generally positive reception, being both applauded and criticized for its adaptation of the traditional elements of role-playing games.

The game later received separate animation and comic adaptations, as well as two sequels for the Nintendo DS.

== Gameplay ==
The gameplay of Blue Dragon uses turn-based gameplay elements seen in older Japanese role-playing video games. The game world contains two major types of areas: towns, in which the player can rest and purchase items, and dungeon-like areas, with numerous foes to be defeated.

=== Exploration ===
Players are initially able to walk between locations on the overworld, and later gain the ability to teleport to previously visited locations. The player controls a party of characters, but only one is shown when exploring the overworld. The player is able to cast magic outside of combat situations based on each character's respective abilities. When combat begins, the entire party appears for battle. Enemies are visible to the player while exploring the game world, and can be avoided. At the same time, players can choose to engage enemies by luring them close and them activating a circle which will allow players to fight multiple monsters at a time. In some cases, specific foes will block a path or desired treasure chest and must be defeated to proceed. Other foes will pursue the player's character once the player is spotted, but players can elude them if they flee far enough. Frequently, a single enemy or monster displayed on the screen actually represents a number of different foes of potentially different types.

Combat begins differently depending on how the player avatar makes contact with the monster. If the avatar strikes an enemy from behind, they take the advantage in battle with a "Back Attack". Similarly, if the avatar is struck from behind, the enemy takes the advantage in a "Surprise Attack". Players can also choose to fight several groups of monsters at once, with each combat taking place immediately after the previous one. A player who successfully employs this tactic is rewarded with bonuses. Players may use "field skills" to aid in controlling enemy encounters, such as using bombs to paralyze enemies. In rare cases, two groups of monsters may be of rival species, in which case a "Monster Fight" will occur, with both monster groups appearing at once and focusing on each other before attacking the player.

=== Shadows ===
Each of the main characters' shadows

The core mechanic in Blue Dragon is the use of magical "shadows", with each playable character having a distinct shadow modeled after either a dragon, a phoenix, a bat, a minotaur, or a saber-toothed tiger. Each shadow can be assigned to a single character class (from a number of such classes) at a time, taking on the attributes and abilities of that class. Only the active class may earn Class levels or "ranks", but players are free to change classes at any time except in combat, allowing the group's shadows to be customized in order to achieve the desired combination of skills.

As shadows increase in rank in a given class, they learn new skills, which can then be assigned to a limited number of skill slots to be used in combat. Shadows can be assigned previously learned skills regardless of their current class. For example, if a shadow is currently set to be a "Generalist", but has previously learned the ability to cast "Barrier Magic" while acting as a member of the Barrier Magic class, the Barrier Magic skill can be set as an active skill. This allows mixing or hybridization, with the player able to pick and choose from among the skills learned by a given shadow.

=== Combat ===
Although combat in the game follows a strictly turn-based formula, the turn sequence of the characters you have are calculated based on the speed statistic of the character, and in some cases characters are allowed to strike before enemies can act if they possess sufficient speed. Different attacks can take varied periods of time to execute.

Another combat timing mechanic featured in the game is the "Charge Meter", which allows players to increase the power of spells or attacks by spending additional time preparing them. This meter is always used for spell casting, as well as when using the "Charge Attack" skill used by the "Monk" class. Although players can choose to act immediately, an ability will become more powerful the longer that the player charges the attack. However, the greater the amount of time one charges attacks, the longer the charging character must wait before the next turn. As a result of this, players can choose to charge up an ability so that the ability triggers shortly before an enemy acts, or can instead aim for the "sweet spot", a special red area on the charging bar, indicating a charge that allows for less time until the next attack, as well as a smaller mana cost. Overall, deciding on the correct amount of charge and letting go of the button at precisely that time can greatly influence the effectiveness of each character's attacks during combat.

== Plot ==
=== Setting ===
Blue Dragon takes place in a fictional open-world environment where every year for the past ten years, purple clouds have mysteriously appeared in the sky, signaling misfortune and disaster for people across the world. For years, a terrifying beast dubbed the "Land Shark", and other lost technologies, such as the "sea cube" came with the purple clouds, killing thousands of people and destroying a number of villages. The world is split up into climate regions, each containing multiple kingdoms and villages, a few of which are not on the main path, but hold small stories, such as the giants, and the sheep, as well as hidden dungeons. Around the environment are multiple sources of treasure.

=== Story ===
On an unnamed world, the legendary purple clouds arrive in Talta Village which is the home of Shu, Kluke, and Jiro. While the other villagers seek shelter, Shu and Jiro slow down the Land Shark. After encountering troubles, Kluke saves them. Together, the three trap the Land Shark in a net, but the Land Shark breaks free and rushes away, with Shu, Jiro, and Kluke dangling from its back. The Land Shark stops in an ancient ruin that the three friends explore. They discover the Land Shark is really a machine—a "Mechat". Without warning, the mechat comes to life, only this time sailing into the sky, again carrying the three with it.

The party arrives at a giant Mechat base in the clouds and are tossed into the throne room of Nene, the apparent leader. Nene explains to them how he enjoys hearing the screams of the dying victims of the Land Shark. The party battles Nene, but are easily defeated. They are thrown out of the base and start to fall to their deaths, but a beam of light from the base catches them, and brings them back to the base. The party find three small floating spheres in the middle of the room; a mysterious voice commands them to swallow the spheres. The party refuses, and instead hold onto the spheres for safekeeping. As they try to reach another Mechat to escape the base, they are forced to fight a large army of Nene's robots. When the battle seems it will never end, and with the unseen voice promising them knowledge of how to pilot the Mechat, the party members eat the spheres. As they consume the spheres, a strange transformation occurs to each, changing the forms of their shadows into powerful beings that are able to destroy the robot army. The party escapes the base and crash in a desert.

After becoming familiar with their new shadows, the party travels to Talta village, befriending Marumaro on the way, who also possesses a magical shadow. Finding that the villagers from Talta have started to head towards the capital city of Jibral, the party takes off after them. Just outside Jibral, the party finds the villagers attacked by Steel-Eating Tigers. They are saved by the arrival of King Jibral and his forces, including Zola. Once the villagers are brought to Jibral, the King decides to implement a plan to destroy one of Nene's bases near Jibral using Shu and his friends along with Zola. Together, the party works with the warriors of Talta Village the Jibral Kingdom to besiege Nene's Mechat base. After the base is destroyed, the party heads north in search of Nene. Nene captures Kluke, and places a collar around her neck which Nene alleges will explode. After reaching Nene, Zola separates from the party to buy them time to attack Nene. When the party attempts to remove Kluke's collar, Nene absorbs the party's shadows by placing collars on all of them. After taking their powers and placing them in himself, he removes their collars and attempts to kill them before they recover. Shu, despite being drained of magical ability, unconsciously teleports the party to the distant Devour village.

In Devour Village, they find themselves unable to escape the village without their magic, because the community is surrounded by evil trees. Shu has an epiphany and finds himself able to summon his dragon shadow without his sphere. Shu destroys the Eat Yeet in Devour Village, and the party is finally able to leave. Eventually all the party are able to summon their shadows again.

At that point, the party reunites with Zola, who supplies a Mechat for them to pursue Nene. As the party goes after Nene in the Mechat, Nene initiates an ancient machine that splits the world into two hemispheres, with thousands of isolated cubes floating between the halves. The party follows Nene to the Primitive Cube at the core of the transformation. The party journeys through the cube eventually defeating General Szabo and ultimately engaging Nene. As the party weakens Nene, it is revealed that Zola was working for Nene all along, and she was the voice that told the others to swallow the spheres. When Zola was too weak to defend herself, Nene had given her a shadow and sent her to Jibral as a spy. Zola betrays and kills Nene choosing her friends over him.

Deathroy, the small creature that has been on Nene's shoulder removes himself from his master's body and absorbs Nene's remaining life force. Deathroy is revealed to be Destroy, the biomechanical weapon that destroyed the legendary ancients that once tried to bring peace to the world. The party defeats Destroy, melting him in lava. The party then quickly escapes from the melting cube to rejoin their families.

== Development ==
Hironobu Sakaguchi giving a presentation on Blue Dragon at the 2006 Tokyo Game Show convention.

Blue Dragon was first revealed in February 2005, as one of two unnamed role-playing games in development by Hawaii-based studio Mistwalker for the console which later came to be known as the Xbox 360. In an IGN interview following the unveiling, Peter Moore stressed the importance to Microsoft of having Japanese games available on the system, commenting "... It's a main priority for me in the next 12–18 months to ensure Japanese developers are our partners". Contributors to Blue Dragon include Microsoft Game Studios Japan and a number of well known Japanese figures in the gaming industry. The title's original story was written by Hironobu Sakaguchi, the game director of the first five Final Fantasy video games. It also features art from Akira Toriyama, the creator of Dragon Ball and visual character and monster designer and illustrator of both the Dragon Quest series and Chrono Trigger. In 2014, Sakaguchi recalled that it was initially a challenge to work with Toriyama because he was not in tune with the latest technology. For example, the Photoshop software Toriyama had on his computer was version 1 or 2, making it difficult to convey ideas. Despite the minor setback, Sakaguchi praised his creativity, saying he had great ideas constantly popping in his head.

Much of the actual software development work on the game was done at Artoon, with Takuya Matsumoto serving as director and Manabu Kusonoki responsible for the game's world view. Matsumoto previously worked at MGSJ as a designer on Blinx 2: Masters of Time and Space, while Kusonoki is known for his work at Sega, including the world of Panzer Dragoon. Near the end of November 2005, roughly a year before the title was released in Japan, Artoon's Naoto Ohshima indicated that the game was around 40% complete. He also pointed out that Artoon had previously been known primarily for action titles, so that responsibility for Blue Dragon was originally somewhat frightening. Following this, a relative lack of media information for most of 2006 resulted in speculation that the title would be delayed until 2007, but Microsoft Japan's Takashi Sensui confirmed in August 2006 that the game would indeed see a year-end 2006 release. Blue Dragon was eventually released on three full DVD discs, making it the first Xbox 360 game to span multiple discs.

=== Music ===
Blue Dragon's score was composed and produced by Nobuo Uematsu, who is better known for composing much of the music in the popular Final Fantasy series. One of the boss themes, "Eternity", was composed by Uematsu, with lyrics by Hironobu Sakaguchi himself, and includes vocals by English singer Ian Gillan. Blue Dragon Original Soundtrack was released on December 13, 2006, and was arranged by Satoshi Henmi and Hiroyuki Nakayama. Music from Blue Dragon was performed live at the Play! A Video Game Symphony concerts in 2006. IGN praised the track "Cave" as one of the "Top 10 Nobuo Uematsu Musical Moments". Enter Shikari also made an instrumental song, "Enter Shikari vs. Blue Dragon". Although the song is present in the game's files, it was exclusively used in a few trailers for the game.

== Reception ==
Reception

Aggregate score
Aggregator	Score
Metacritic	79/100

Review scores
Publication	Score
Edge	6/10
Electronic Gaming Monthly	6.83/10
Eurogamer	5/10
Famitsu	37/40
Game Informer	9/10
GamePro	4.75/5
GameSpot	6/10
GameSpy	4/5
GameTrailers	7.5/10
GameZone	8.8/10
IGN	(US) 7.9/10 (AU) 7/10
Official Xbox Magazine (US)	7.5/10
RPGFan	(Lewis) 84% (Miller) 77%
411Mania	8.8/10

Pre-orders of the game bundled with a limited edition Xbox 360 Core system were sold out in Japan well before the December 7, 2006, release date. Famitsu gave the game a score of three nines and one ten. Microsoft and Mistwalker initially hoped to sell over 200,000 units, which would break their record for sales of an Xbox 360 game in Japan. The game did manage the goal, with almost exactly 200,000 units sold as of December 2007. Creator Hironobu Sakaguchi was pleased the game sold as well as it did.

The game received "generally favorable reviews" according to the review aggregation website Metacritic. While many reviewers praised the game for its traditional approach, a few reviewers criticized it for that very reason, with one reviewer remarking: "In fact, there is very little you can point to in Blue Dragon that hasn't been done multiple times over before". The story also came under scrutiny from some reviewers for being too generic and too similar to existing Japanese RPGs, with slow pacing during the beginning of the game. Eurogamer commented that the apparent lack of effort put into the facial animations for each character resulted in a limited ability to express emotion. They also noted that the mouth movements are well timed, but that the rest of the characters' facial movements are "static".

Game Informer said that Blue Dragon lacked "jaw dropping" moments and that there was a "hard-to-define spark" missing from the story and events. 1Up.com also picked up on this, adding that Blue Dragon was missing "strong characters, gripping storytelling, and excellent pacing". X-Play said that the game was very visually pleasing, but indicated that it was like any other role-playing game. Though most of the reviewers criticized the game in one way or another, they all complimented it for its excellent graphics and music. Specifically, Game Informer remarked that "the characters look like sculpted figurines wandering around a world built to scale". GameSpy complimented the title's music and graphics saying the game had "phenomenal music and magnificently rendered cutscenes".

== Legacy ==
In a November 2006 interview with IGN, Sakaguchi confirmed that the sequel, Blue Dragon 2, was in the planning stages, and would presumably start development shortly thereafter. Later in an issue of Weekly Shōnen Jump, Blue Dragon Plus was in the works for the Nintendo DS. It is a real-time simulation RPG, featuring 2D sprite graphics, and was released in September 2008 in Japan and in February 2009 in North America. In 2009, a second Blue Dragon title was released for the DS, Blue Dragon: Awakened Shadow. The latter is more action oriented, and follows a player-created character, rather than Shu.

On November 1, 2019, Blue Dragon was made available on Xbox One (and later Xbox Series) via the Xbox backwards compatibility program. An unofficial port of the game for Windows, macOS, and Linux, re:Blue, was released on August 28, 2026. The port contains numerous enhancements, including support for high resolutions and framerates, as well as mod support.

=== In other media ===
A manga adaptation loosely based on the game, Ral Grad, ran in Weekly Shōnen Jump from December 2006 to July 2007. The artwork was done by Takeshi Obata. A second manga adaptation, Blue Dragon - Secret Trick (a.k.a. Blue Dragon ST), was created by Ami Shibata. It was translated into Brazilian Portuguese by Editora JBC.

An anime adaptation of the same name was produced by Studio Pierrot and ran on TV Tokyo for 102 episodes from April 2007 to March 2009. The series was dubbed into english by Viz Media, and briefly aired on Cartoon Network in the United States.
