= List of Square video games =

Video games by developer/publisher

Square's logo before its merger with Enix

Square was a Japanese video game development and publishing company founded in September 1986 by Masafumi Miyamoto. It began as a computer game software division of Den-Yu-Sha, a power line construction company owned by Miyamoto's father. Square's first releases were The Death Trap and its sequel Will: The Death Trap II; they sold over 100,000 copies, a major success for the time. In September 1986, Square spun off from Den-Yu-Sha and became Square Co., Ltd. While its next few games sold poorly, 1987's Final Fantasy sold over 500,000 copies, sparking the company's flagship series.

Square was best known for its role-playing video game franchises, which include the Final Fantasy series. Of its properties, this franchise is the best-selling, with total worldwide sales of over 173 million units. During its existence, the company developed or published dozens of titles in various video game franchises on numerous gaming systems. On April 1, 2003, Square merged with video game publisher Enix to form Square Enix. This list includes retail games developed or published by Square during its existence.

== Games ==
List of games
Title	System	Release date	Developer(s)	JP	NA	EU	AUS	Ref(s)
The Death Trap	PC-8801; PC-9801; FM-7	October 31, 1984	Square	Yes				
Will: The Death Trap II	PC-8801; PC-9801; FM-7; X1	June 1985	Square	Yes				
Thexder	X1; Nintendo Entertainment System	July 20, 1985; December 19, 1985	Game Arts	Yes				
Genesis	PC-8801	September 28, 1985	Square	Yes				
Cruise Chaser Blassty	PC-8801; PC-9801; X1	April 30, 1986	Square	Yes				
Alpha	PC-8801; PC-9801; X1; FM-7	July 8, 1986	Square	Yes				
King's Knight	Nintendo Entertainment System; MSX	September 18, 1986; November 1986	Square / Workss	Yes	Yes			
Suishō no Dragon	Family Computer Disk System	December 15, 1986	Square	Yes				
Deep Dungeon: Madō Senki	Family Computer Disk System	December 19, 1986	HummingBirdSoft	Yes				
The 3-D Battles of WorldRunner	Nintendo Entertainment System	March 12, 1987	Square	Yes	Yes			
Apple Town Story	Family Computer Disk System	April 3, 1987	Square	Yes				
Mystery Quest	Family Computer Disk System	May 11, 1987	Carry Lab	Yes				
Yūshi no Monshō: Deep Dungeon	Family Computer Disk System	May 30, 1987	HummingBirdSoft	Yes				
King's Knight Special	PC-8801; X1	June 1987	Square / Workss	Yes				
Aliens: Alien 2	PC-8801; PC-9801; MSX; Family Computer Disk System (unreleased)	June 10, 1987	Square	Yes				
Jikai Shounen Met Mag	Family Computer Disk System	July 3, 1987	Thinking Rabbit	Yes				
Cleopatra no Mahō	Family Computer Disk System	July 24, 1987	Square	Yes				
Rad Racer	Nintendo Entertainment System	August 7, 1987	Square	Yes	Yes	Yes		
Kalin no Tsurugi	Family Computer Disk System	October 2, 1987	Xtalsoft	Yes				
Nakayama Miho no Tokimeki High School	Family Computer Disk System	December 1, 1987	Square / Nintendo	Yes				
JJ: Tobidase Daisakusen Part II	Nintendo Entertainment System	December 7, 1987	Square	Yes				
Final Fantasy	Nintendo Entertainment System	December 18, 1987	Square	Yes	Yes			
Deep Dungeon III: Yūshi heno Tabi	Nintendo Entertainment System	May 13, 1988	HummingBirdSoft	Yes				
Akuusenki Raijin	Family Computer Disk System	July 12, 1988	Micro Cabin	Yes				
Moon Ball Magic	Family Computer Disk System	July 12, 1988	System Sacom	Yes				
Hanjuku Hero	Nintendo Entertainment System	December 2, 1988	Square	Yes				
Final Fantasy II	Nintendo Entertainment System	December 17, 1988	Square	Yes				
Square's Tom Sawyer	Nintendo Entertainment System	November 30, 1989	Square	Yes				
The Final Fantasy Legend	Game Boy	December 15, 1989	Square	Yes	Yes			
Final Fantasy III	Nintendo Entertainment System; WonderSwan Color (unreleased)	April 27, 1990	Square	Yes				
Rad Racer II	Nintendo Entertainment System	June 1990	Square		Yes			
Final Fantasy Legend II	Game Boy	December 14, 1990	Square	Yes	Yes			
NA: Final Fantasy Adventure; EU: Mystic Quest	Game Boy	June 28, 1991	Square	Yes	Yes	Yes		
Final Fantasy IV	Super Nintendo Entertainment System	July 19, 1991	Square	Yes	Yes			
Final Fantasy IV Easytype	Super Nintendo Entertainment System	November 29, 1991	Square	Yes				
Final Fantasy Legend III	Game Boy	December 13, 1991	Square	Yes	Yes			
Romancing SaGa	Super Nintendo Entertainment System	January 28, 1992	Square	Yes				
NA: Final Fantasy Mystic Quest; EU: Mystic Quest Legend	Super Nintendo Entertainment System	October 5, 1992	Square	Yes	Yes	Yes	Yes	
Final Fantasy V	Super Nintendo Entertainment System	December 6, 1992	Square	Yes				
Hanjuku Hero: Aa, Sekaiyo Hanjukunare...!	Super Nintendo Entertainment System	December 19, 1992	Square	Yes				
Secret of Mana	Super Nintendo Entertainment System	August 6, 1993	Square	Yes	Yes	Yes	Yes	
Romancing SaGa 2	Super Nintendo Entertainment System	December 10, 1993	Square	Yes				
Alcahest	Super Nintendo Entertainment System	December 17, 1993	HAL Laboratory	Yes				
Breath of Fire (Note: Capcom game whose North American version was published by Square.)	Super Nintendo Entertainment System	February 24, 1994	Capcom	Yes	Yes			
Final Fantasy I•II	Nintendo Entertainment System	February 27, 1994	Square	Yes				
Final Fantasy VI	Super Nintendo Entertainment System	April 2, 1994	Square	Yes	Yes			
Live A Live	Super Nintendo Entertainment System	September 2, 1994	Square	Yes				
Front Mission	Super Nintendo Entertainment System	February 24, 1995	G-Craft	Yes				
Chrono Trigger	Super Nintendo Entertainment System	March 11, 1995	Square	Yes	Yes			
Trials of Mana	Super Nintendo Entertainment System	September 30, 1995	Square	Yes				
Secret of Evermore	Super Nintendo Entertainment System	October 1995	Square		Yes	Yes	Yes	
Romancing SaGa 3	Super Nintendo Entertainment System	November 11, 1995	Square	Yes				
Dynami Tracer	Satellaview	January 27, 1996	Square	Yes				
Koi wa Balance	Satellaview	January 27, 1996	Square	Yes				
Radical Dreamers: Nusumenai Hōseki	Satellaview	February 3, 1996	Square	Yes				
Bahamut Lagoon	Super Nintendo Entertainment System	February 9, 1996	Square	Yes				
Treasure Conflix	Satellaview	February 10, 1996	Square	Yes				
Front Mission Series: Gun Hazard	Super Nintendo Entertainment System	February 23, 1996	Omiya Soft	Yes				
Super Mario RPG	Super Nintendo Entertainment System	March 9, 1996	Square / Nintendo	Yes	Yes			
Treasure of the Rudras	Super Nintendo Entertainment System	April 5, 1996	Square	Yes				
Treasure Hunter G	Super Nintendo Entertainment System	May 24, 1996	Sting Entertainment	Yes				
Tobal No. 1	PlayStation	August 2, 1996	DreamFactory	Yes	Yes	Yes		
Final Fantasy VII	PlayStation	January 31, 1997	Square	Yes	Yes	Yes	Yes	
Pro-Logic Mah-Jong Hai-Shin	PlayStation	January 31, 1997	Aques	Yes				
Bushido Blade	PlayStation	March 14, 1997	Lightweight	Yes	Yes	Yes		
Final Fantasy IV	PlayStation	March 21, 1997	Tose	Yes	Yes			
Power Stakes	PlayStation	April 11, 1997	Aques	Yes				
Tobal 2	PlayStation	April 25, 1997	DreamFactory	Yes				
Digical League	PlayStation	June 20, 1997	Aques	Yes				
Final Fantasy Tactics	PlayStation	June 20, 1997	Square	Yes	Yes			
SaGa Frontier	PlayStation	July 11, 1997	Square	Yes	Yes			
Front Mission 2	PlayStation	September 25, 1997	G-Craft	Yes				
Final Fantasy VII International	PlayStation	October 1997	Square	Yes				
Power Stakes Grade 1	PlayStation	October 9, 1997	Aques	Yes				
Einhänder	PlayStation	November 20, 1997	Square	Yes	Yes			
Front Mission Alternative	PlayStation	December 18, 1997	Square	Yes				
Chocobo's Mysterious Dungeon	PlayStation	December 23, 1997	Square	Yes				
Super Live Stadium	PlayStation	January 1, 1998	Aques	Yes				
Xenogears	PlayStation	February 11, 1998	Square	Yes	Yes			
Bushido Blade 2	PlayStation	February 28, 1998	Lightweight	Yes	Yes			
Final Fantasy V	PlayStation	March 13, 1998	Tose	Yes	Yes	Yes	Yes	
Hai-Shin 2	PlayStation	March 26, 1998	Aques	Yes				
Parasite Eve	PlayStation	March 29, 1998	Square	Yes	Yes			
Power Stakes 2	PlayStation	April 9, 1998	Aques	Yes				
Sōkaigi	PlayStation	May 28, 1998	Yuke's	Yes				
Final Fantasy VII	Microsoft Windows	June 24, 1998	Square	Yes	Yes	Yes		
Brave Fencer Musashi	PlayStation	July 26, 1998	Square	Yes	Yes			
Another Mind	PlayStation	November 12, 1998	Square	Yes				
Ehrgeiz	PlayStation	December 17, 1998	DreamFactory	Yes	Yes	Yes		
Chocobo's Dungeon 2	PlayStation	December 23, 1998	Square	Yes	Yes			
iS – internal section	PlayStation	January 28, 1999	Positron	Yes				
Final Fantasy VIII	PlayStation	February 11, 1999	Square	Yes	Yes	Yes	Yes	
Chocobo World (included with Final Fantasy VIII)	PocketStation	February 11, 1999	Square	Yes				
Final Fantasy Collection	PlayStation	March 11, 1999	Tose	Yes				
Final Fantasy VI	PlayStation	March 11, 1999	Tose	Yes	Yes	Yes	Yes	
Chocobo Racing	PlayStation	March 18, 1999	Square	Yes	Yes	Yes		
SaGa Frontier 2	PlayStation	April 1, 1999	Square	Yes	Yes	Yes	Yes	
Go Go Digger (included with SaGa Frontier 2)	PocketStation	April 1, 1999	Square	Yes				
Cyber Org	PlayStation	April 22, 1999	FuzzBox	Yes				
Racing Lagoon	PlayStation	June 10, 1999	Square	Yes				
Legend of Mana	PlayStation	July 15, 1999	Square	Yes	Yes			
Ring Ring Land (included with Legend of Mana)	PocketStation	July 15, 1999	Square	Yes				
Front Mission 3	PlayStation	September 2, 1999	Square	Yes	Yes	Yes	Yes	
Final Fantasy Anthology	PlayStation	September 30, 1999	Square		Yes	Yes		
Threads of Fate	PlayStation	October 14, 1999	Square	Yes	Yes			
Chrono Trigger	PlayStation	November 2, 1999	Tose	Yes				
Chrono Cross	PlayStation	November 18, 1999	Square	Yes	Yes			
Parasite Eve II	PlayStation	December 16, 1999	Square	Yes	Yes	Yes		
Chocobo Collection	PlayStation	December 22, 1999	Square / ParityBit / Denyusha	Yes				
Final Fantasy VIII	Microsoft Windows	January 25, 2000	Square	Yes	Yes	Yes		
Vagrant Story	PlayStation	February 10, 2000	Square	Yes	Yes	Yes	Yes	
Driving Emotion Type-S	PlayStation 2	March 30, 2000	Escape	Yes	Yes	Yes		
All Star Pro-Wrestling	PlayStation 2	June 8, 2000	Square	Yes				
Final Fantasy IX	PlayStation	July 7, 2000	Square	Yes	Yes	Yes		
Gekikuukan Pro Baseball: At the End of the Century 1999	PlayStation 2	September 7, 2000	Square	Yes				
Hataraku Chocobo	WonderSwan	September 21, 2000	Square	Yes				
Final Fantasy	WonderSwan Color	December 9, 2000	Square	Yes				
The Bouncer	PlayStation 2	December 23, 2000	DreamFactory	Yes	Yes	Yes		
Wild Card	WonderSwan Color	March 29, 2001	Square	Yes				
Final Fantasy II	WonderSwan Color	May 3, 2001	Square	Yes				
Final Fantasy Chronicles	PlayStation	June 29, 2001	Tose		Yes			
Blue Wing Blitz	WonderSwan Color	July 5, 2001	Square	Yes				
Final Fantasy X	PlayStation 2	July 19, 2001	Square	Yes	Yes	Yes	Yes	
All Star Pro-Wrestling II	PlayStation 2	November 22, 2001	Square	Yes				
Romancing SaGa	WonderSwan Color	December 20, 2001	Square	Yes				
Final Fantasy X International	PlayStation 2	January 31, 2002	Square	Yes				
Hanjuku Hero: Aa, Sekaiyo Hanjukunare...!	WonderSwan Color	February 14, 2002	Sting Entertainment	Yes				
The Final Fantasy Legend	WonderSwan Color	March 20, 2002	Aspect	Yes				
Final Fantasy IV	WonderSwan Color	March 29, 2002	Sting Entertainment	Yes				
Kingdom Hearts	PlayStation 2	March 28, 2002	Square	Yes	Yes	Yes	Yes	
Neichibeikan Professional Baseball Final League	PlayStation 2	April 25, 2002	Square	Yes				
Final Fantasy XI	PlayStation 2	May 16, 2002	Square	Yes	Yes	Yes		
World Fantasista	PlayStation 2	June 6, 2002	Square	Yes				
Front Mission	WonderSwan Color	July 12, 2002	G-Craft	Yes				
Final Fantasy	PlayStation	October 31, 2002	Square	Yes	Yes	Yes		
Final Fantasy II	PlayStation	October 31, 2002	Square	Yes	Yes	Yes		
Final Fantasy XI	Microsoft Windows	November 7, 2002	Square	Yes	Yes	Yes	Yes	
Chocobo Land: A Game of Dice	Game Boy Advance; WonderSwan Color (unreleased)	December 13, 2002	Square	Yes				
Unlimited Saga	PlayStation 2	December 19, 2002	Square	Yes	Yes	Yes		
Final Fantasy Tactics Advance	Game Boy Advance	February 14, 2003	Square	Yes	Yes	Yes	Yes	
Final Fantasy X-2	PlayStation 2	March 13, 2003	Square	Yes	Yes	Yes	Yes	
