= Hiromichi Tanaka =

Japanese video game producer (born 1962)

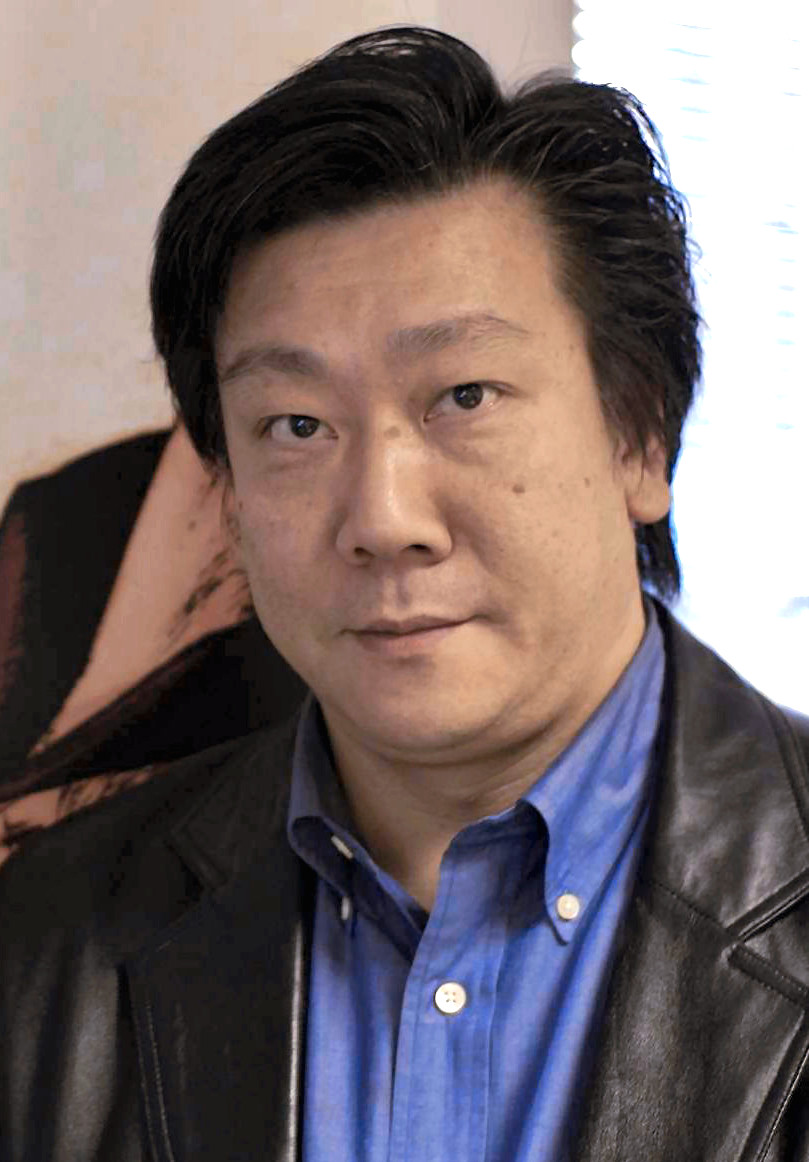
- Tanaka in London, England, January 2007
- Born: January 7, 1962 (age 64); Ichikawa, Chiba, Japan
- Occupations: Video game producer and director
- Years active: 1983–present
- Employers: Square (1983–2003); Square Enix (2003–2012); GungHo Online Entertainment (2012–present)
- Known for: Final Fantasy series; Mana series

Hiromichi Tanaka (田中 弘道, Tanaka Hiromichi; born January 7, 1962) is a Japanese video game developer, game producer, game director and game designer. He was Senior Vice President of Software Development at Square Enix (formerly Square) and the head of the company's Product Development Division-3.

== Biography ==
In 1983, Tanaka dropped out of Yokohama National University along with Hironobu Sakaguchi to join Square, a newly formed software branch of the Denyuusha Electric Company. Along with Sakaguchi and Kazuhiko Aoki, Tanaka was part of Square's original Planning and Development department.

He is best known as the former lead developer of Final Fantasy XI, Square's first massively multiplayer online role playing game (MMORPG). He oversaw development of Final Fantasy XI and Final Fantasy XIV until late 2010. He also worked in a prominent role for earlier single-player games including Secret of Mana, Trials of Mana, Xenogears, Threads of Fate, Chrono Cross, and the Nintendo DS version of Final Fantasy III. Tanaka also worked on the original Famicom version of Final Fantasy III in 1990.

Final Fantasy XIV received negative reception from critics and players, and was considered a financial loss for Square Enix. Three months after its release in 2010, Tanaka was removed from the Final Fantasy XIV team and replaced by Naoki Yoshida. At the Vana'diel Fan Festival 2012, an event celebrating Final Fantasy XI's 10th anniversary, Tanaka announced his departure from Square Enix for health reasons. In 2012, Tanaka joined GungHo Online Entertainment as a freelance advisor to the company.

== Works ==
Year	Title	Credit(s)	Ref.
1984	The Death Trap	Game design	
1985	Genesis	Director, game design, scenario	
1986	Alpha	Game design, scenario	
1986	Suishō no Dragon	Game design	
1987	Aliens: Alien 2	Director, game design	
1987	Cleopatra no Mahō	Director, game design	
1987	Nakayama Miho no Tokimeki High School	Staff	
1987	Final Fantasy	Game design	
1988	Final Fantasy II	Game design	
1989	Square's Tom Sawyer	Cooperation	
1990	Final Fantasy III	Game design	
1990	Final Fantasy Legend II	Main data	
1993	Secret of Mana	Producer, system design, scenario message data	
1995	Trials of Mana	Director	
1998	Xenogears	Producer, battle planner	
1999	Threads of Fate	Producer	
1999	Chrono Cross	Producer, battle system design	
2002	Final Fantasy XI	Producer (until 2012)	
2003	Final Fantasy XI: Rise of the Zilart	Producer	
2003	Sword of Mana	Executive producer	
2004	Final Fantasy XI: Chains of Promathia	Producer	
2006	Final Fantasy III (Nintendo DS)	Director, executive producer	
2006	Final Fantasy XI: Treasures of Aht Urhgan	Producer	
2007	Final Fantasy XI: Wings of the Goddess	Producer	
2009	SaGa 2: Goddess of Destiny	Co-executive producer	
2010	Final Fantasy XIV	Producer (until December 2010)	
2011	Final Fantasy III	Supervisor	
2015	MOJI-POP'N	Producer	
2016	Seventh Rebirth	Producer	
2023	JET DRAGON	Special Thanks	
