= Disk Original Group =

Japanese video game software brand

- Disuku Orijinaru Grūpu
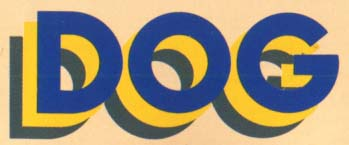
- Disk Original Group logo
- Formation: July 1986
- Type: Video game development collective
- Legal status: Defunct
- Headquarters: Japan
- Products: Video games
- Official language: Japanese
- Affiliations: Square; Carry Lab; Xtalsoft; System Sacom; Thinking Rabbit; HummingBirdSoft; Microcabin

Disk Original Group (ディスク・オリジナル・グループ, Disuku Orijinaru Grūpu), usually abbreviated to DOG, was a video game development collective of seven companies led by Square. Together with six other companies that developed primarily for personal computers, they released several games for the Famicom Disk System in the mid-to-late 1980s.

== History ==
DOG was established in July 1986 to pool financial resources for the seven then-fledgling companies to develop independently for the Famicom. At the time of its formation, the only member with any prior involvement in the Famicom market was Square. DOG was unusual in that its other six members, active since the early days of PC gaming, were primarily developers of computer role-playing video games and adventure games.

Square was responsible for all sales and marketing under the DOG label, and the other six companies handled development and managed intellectual property rights. In-game copyright notices retain the name of the original developer. DOG and Square shared a Famicom licensee code.

All except Square and Carry Lab had previously worked together on Gall Force: Eternal Story under the name Session 61, in addition to founding another collective known as ScapTrust. The other three companies involved in the ScapTrust venture — Bothtec, BPS, and SystemSoft — did not join DOG as they were already active in the Famicom market.

In 1988, when all seven companies had developed at least one game, the DOG brand came to a natural end. Factors contributing to the end of DOG include higher-capacity cartridges and battery backup saves beginning to take hold in the industry, thus obsoleting some core advantages of the floppy disk, and Disk System development generally falling out of favor.

=== Members ===
The seven constituent companies of DOG were:

- Square (leader)
- Carry Lab
- Xtalsoft
- System Sacom
- Thinking Rabbit
- HummingBirdSoft (Apple Mac division)
- Microcabin

All seven withdrew from video game development, most do not exist as they originally did, and Square merged with Enix to form Square Enix.

== Games ==
A total of eleven games were released under the DOG brand.

Square

- Suishō no Dragon
- The 3-D Battles of WorldRunner
- Apple Town Monogatari
- Cleopatra no Mahō

Carry Lab

- Mystery Quest

XTALSOFT

- Kalin no Tsurugi

System Sacom

- Moon Ball Magic

Thinking Rabbit

- Jikai Shōnen Mettomag

HummingBirdSoft

- Deep Dungeon series
  - Deep Dungeon: Madō Senki
  - Yūki no Monshō: Deep Dungeon II

Microcabin

- Akū Senki Raijin

=== Canceled games ===
Square

- Seiken Densetsu: The Emergence of Excalibur

This was intended for release in 1987 as the first of a pentalogy, but ultimately cancelled. The Seiken Densetsu name and trademark were later reused for the entirely unrelated 1991 Game Boy game Seiken Densetsu: Final Fantasy Gaiden (known in North America as Final Fantasy Adventure and in Europe as Mystic Quest), the first entry in what would come to be known as the Mana series.
