= Cruise Chaser Blassty =

1986 video game

- Developer: Square
- Publisher: Square
- Designers: Hironobu Sakaguchi; Kazuhiko Aoki
- Composers: Takashi Uno; Nobuo Uematsu
- Platforms: PC-8801; PC-9801; Sharp X1
- Release: JP: April 30, 1986
- Genre: Role-playing game
- Mode: Single player

Cruise Chaser Blassty (Note: Japanese: クルーズチェイサー ブラスティー, Hepburn: Kurūzu Cheisā Burasutī) is a 1986 role-playing video game developed by Square for various Japanese computers, including the NEC PC-8801, PC-9801, and Sharp X1. The game had an unusual battle system, which involved the player controlling a customizable mecha robot from a first-person view. It followed a group of young people from Earth caught up in a war between a solar-system spanning government and a group of rebels. After release, the game's story was adapted to a manga and serialized, then released as a pair of standalone books. Cruise Chaser Blassty was the first video game worked on by composer Nobuo Uematsu.

== Gameplay ==
The game is played through a first-person perspective, with a role-playing battle system and the ability to customize the player's mecha. The bottom of the screen shows various gauges and power levels of the mecha's systems, while the majority of the screen shows the current view of the mecha. The player flies the mecha through space, coming across groups of enemy spaceships. Battle in these cases is handled through a series of text boxes, in which the player decides how much of their available power to spend on an attack, and then the results of the attack are displayed. When the player encounters an enemy mecha instead, the main screen is split into two, with each half showing either the player or enemy mecha. The player selects their attack type via a menu, and simple animations play out on each half of the screen, one at a time, to show the attack and the results.

== Plot ==
The game's story focuses on a group of young people from Earth caught up in a war between a group of rebels and a government controlling the Solar System. The game is set in the future, where the majority of humanity is ruled by a group, called the Commune, that lives in a giant space station named Ondina orbiting the Earth, which oversees the development and expansion of humanity throughout the Solar System. A group of rebels called the Inverse, based on Mars, are rebelling against what they see as an oppressive government. The primary weapons in the fight are space fighters called Cruise Chasers, which can transform into giant robots using the "Blassty" system; other types of space fighters are also used. The player may choose whether the Inverse or the Commune win, giving the game two different endings.

== Development ==
The game was designed and written by Hironobu Sakaguchi and Kazuhiko Aoki. The graphics were made by Hiromi Nakata and Bruno Miki, and the original designs for the mecha were done by Mika Akitaka. The programming for the game was done by Shun Saigusa for the PC-8801 version, Makoto Wakamatsu for the PC-9801 version, and Takashi Koyama for the X1 version. Project EGG, a licensed emulator for home computer games, included Cruise Chaser Blassty in its limited edition "Classic PC-Game Collection" on September 8, 2013, alongside The Death Trap, Will: The Death Trap II, Alpha, and Genesis—other Square games released between 1984 and 1987. They released the game to their web-based emulator as well on May 2, 2014.

The soundtrack to Cruise Chaser Blassty was Nobuo Uematsu's debut project, which he composed with Takashi Uno. A vinyl album was included with the release, containing three tracks from the game.

== Reception and legacy ==
The game was the fifth game published by Square, and their third developed internally. In 1987, the game's story was adapted into a novel and was serialized in Hobby Japan magazine from 1986 to 1987. The chapters were collected into two tankōbon volumes labeled "Part I" and "Part II" released in December 1990 and April 1991 respectively. A sequel to the novel, titled Cruise Chaser Blassty 2, was released in April 1992.
