= List of Xtalsoft games =

The following is a list of games developed or published by the defunct Japanese computer and video game company, Xtalsoft.

== Sharp MZ-700 ==
- 1983
  - Holy Sword

== Hitachi S1 ==
- 1985
  - Lizard
- 1986
  - Heart of Phantasm II (夢幻の心臓II)

== NEC PC-6001 ==
- Dates Unknown
  - Holy Sword
  - Great Detective Appearance!
  - Lizard
  - Vandal
  - Earthbound
  - Aspic
  - UFO Attack
  - U-boat S.O.S.
  - Newton's Power
  - Green Beam
  - Red Zone Killer
  - Rush Hour Game
  - ドッグファイター
  - Wルービック パネル
  - レーザーワープ ゲーム
  - バイキン・ウォーズ

== PC-6001mkII ==
- 1986
  - Aspic

== NEC PC-8801 ==
- 1983
  - Holy Sword
  - 高速機動部隊
- 1984
  - Great Detective Appearance!
  - Ninja Residence
  - Grand Cross
  - 白伝説
  - Lizard
- 1985
  - Fantasian
  - Heart of Phantasm II (夢幻の心臓II)
- 1986
  - Heart of Phantasm II (夢幻の心臓II)
  - Babylon

== NEC PC-8801mkIISR ==
- 1987
  - Babylon
  - Crimson
  - Jehard
  - Mr. Professional Baseball
- 1988
  - Battle Gorilla
  - Advanced Fantasian
- 1989
  - Crimson II
- 1990
  - Heart of Phantasm III (夢幻の心臓III)
  - Crimson III
- Dates Unknown
  - Fantasian
  - Lizard (computer game)
  - 白伝説
  - Heart of Phantasm (夢幻の心臓)
  - Heart of Phantasm II (夢幻の心臓II)

== NEC PC-98 ==
- 1984
  - Heart of Phantasm (夢幻の心臓)
- 1986
  - Heart of Phantasm II (夢幻の心臓II)

== Fujitsu FM-7 ==
- 1983
  - Holy Sword
- 1984
  - Earthbound
  - Ninja Residence
  - Grand Cross
- 1986
  - Heart of Phantasm II (夢幻の心臓II)

== Fujitsu FM-77AV ==
- 1986
  - Aspic
- 1987
  - Babylon

== Fujitsu FM-8 ==
- 1984
  - Ninja Residence

== Sharp X1 ==
- 1987
  - Aspic Special
- Dates Unknown
  - Heart of Phantasm II (夢幻の心臓II)

== MSX ==
- 1987
  - Bolu Fez and 5 Evil Spirits

== MSX2 ==
- 1989
  - Crimson II
- 1990
  - Crimson III

== Famicom Disk System ==
- 1987
  - Sword of Kalin
- 1988
  - Aspic

== Commodore 64 ==
- 1989
  - Curse of Babylon
