= Nobuo Uematsu =

Japanese composer (born 1959)

- 植松 伸夫
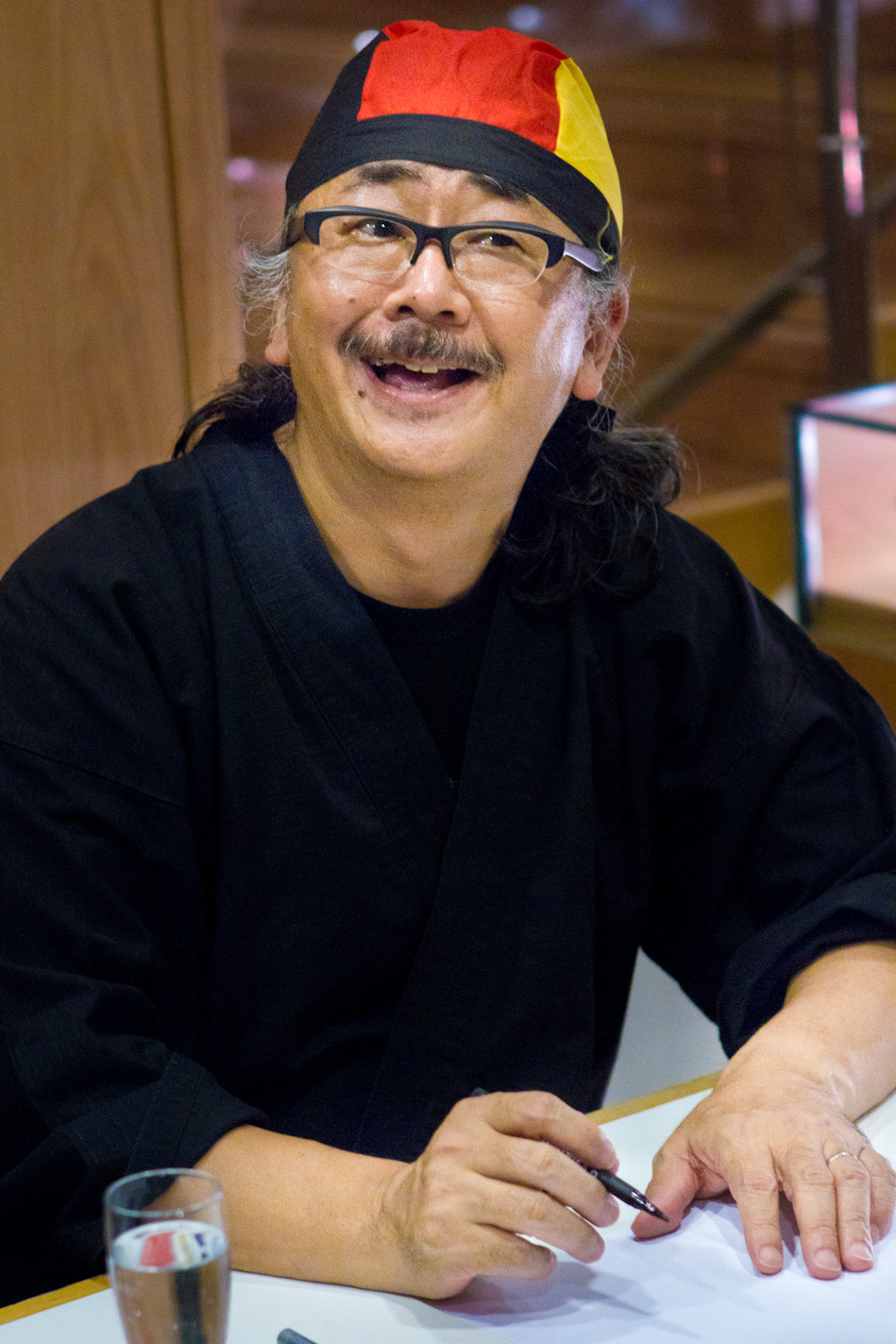
- Uematsu in 2011
- Born: March 21, 1959 (age 67); Kōchi, Kōchi, Japan
- Education: Kanagawa University
- Occupations: Composer; keyboardist
- Years active: 1986–present
- Employer: Square (1986–2004)
- Musical career
- Genres: Video game music; symphonic rock; progressive rock
- Instruments: Piano; keyboards
- Label: Dog Ear Records
- Website: dogearrecords.com

Nobuo Uematsu (植松 伸夫, Uematsu Nobuo; born March 21, 1959) is a Japanese composer and keyboardist best known for his contributions to the Final Fantasy video game series by Square Enix. A self-taught musician, he began playing the piano at the age of twelve. Uematsu joined Square in 1986, where he first met Final Fantasy creator Hironobu Sakaguchi. The two later worked together on many games at the company, most notably in the Final Fantasy series. After nearly two decades with Square, Uematsu left in 2004 to create his own production company and music label, Dog Ear Records. He has since composed music as a freelancer for other games, including ones developed by Square Enix and Sakaguchi's studio Mistwalker.

Many soundtracks and arranged albums of Uematsu's game scores have been released. Pieces from his video game works have been performed in various Final Fantasy concerts, where he has worked with conductor Arnie Roth and Game Concerts producer Thomas Böcker on several of these performances. Uematsu was also the keyboardist in The Black Mages in the 2000s, which played various hard rock versions of his Final Fantasy compositions. He has since performed with the Earthbound Papas, which he formed as the successor to The Black Mages in 2011. Uematsu has made several listings in Britain's Classic FM Hall of Fame, with the station referring to him as the Beethoven of game music.

== Biography ==
=== Early life ===
Uematsu was born on March 21, 1959, in Kōchi, the capital city of Kōchi Prefecture, Japan. A self-taught musician, he began to play the piano when he was twelve years old, and did not take any formal piano lessons. He has an older sister who also played the piano. After graduating from Kanagawa University with a degree in English, Uematsu played the keyboard in several amateur bands and composed music for television commercials. When Uematsu was working at a music rental shop in Tokyo, a Square employee asked if he would be interested in creating music for some of the titles they were working on. Although he agreed, Uematsu at the time considered it a side job, and he did not think it would become a full-time career. He said it was a way to make some money on the side, while also keeping his part-time job at the music rental shop.

=== Square (1986–2004) ===
Uematsu joined Square in 1986, with his first work being a few tracks for Cruise Chaser Blassty. He met game designer Hironobu Sakaguchi shortly after, who asked him if he wanted to create music for some of his games, to which Uematsu agreed. For the next year, he created music for a number of games which did not achieve widespread success, such as King's Knight, 3-D WorldRunner, and Rad Racer. In 1987, Uematsu and Sakaguchi collaborated on what was originally to be Sakaguchi's last contribution for Square, Final Fantasy. Final Fantasy's popularity sparked Uematsu's career in video game music, and he would go on to compose music for over 30 titles, most prominently the subsequent games in the Final Fantasy series. He scored the first installment in the SaGa series, The Final Fantasy Legend, in 1989. For the second game in the series, Final Fantasy Legend II he was assisted by Kenji Ito. In late 1994, Uematsu was asked to finish the soundtrack for Chrono Trigger after Yasunori Mitsuda contracted peptic ulcers. In 1996, he co-composed the soundtrack to Front Mission: Gun Hazard, and created the entire score for Dynami Tracer. He also created music for three of the games in the Hanjuku Hero series.

Outside of video games, he has composed the main theme for the 2000 animated film Ah! My Goddess: The Movie and co-composed the 2001 anime Final Fantasy: Unlimited with Shirō Hamaguchi. He also inspired the Ten Plants concept albums, and released a solo album in 1994, titled Phantasmagoria. Feeling gradually more dissatisfied and uninspired, Uematsu requested the assistance of composers Masashi Hamauzu and Junya Nakano for the score to Final Fantasy X in 2001. This marked the first time that Uematsu did not compose an entire main-series Final Fantasy soundtrack. For Final Fantasy XI from 2002, he was joined by Naoshi Mizuta, who composed the majority of the soundtrack, and Kumi Tanioka; Uematsu was responsible for only eleven tracks. In 2002, fellow Square colleagues Kenichiro Fukui and Tsuyoshi Sekito asked Uematsu to join them in forming a rock band that focused on reinterpreting and expanding on Uematsu's compositions. He declined their offer at first because he was too busy with work; however, after agreeing to perform with Fukui and Sekito in a live performance as a keyboardist, he decided to join them in making a band. Another employee at Square, Mr. Matsushita, chose the name The Black Mages for their band. In 2003, Keiji Kawamori, Arata Hanyuda, and Michio Okamiya also joined the band. The Black Mages released three studio albums and performed at several concerts.

=== Freelancer (2004–present) ===
Uematsu left Square Enix in 2004 and formed his own production company, Smile Please. He later founded the music production company and record label Dog Ear Records in 2006. The reason for Uematsu's departure was that the company moved their office from Meguro to Shinjuku, Tokyo and he was not comfortable with the new location. He also stated that he had reached an age where he should gradually take his life into his own hands. He does, however, continue to compose music as a freelancer for Square Enix. In 2005, Uematsu and several members of The Black Mages created the score for the CGI film Final Fantasy VII Advent Children. Uematsu composed only the main theme for Final Fantasy XII (2006); he was originally offered the job of creating the full score, but Hitoshi Sakimoto was eventually assigned as the main composer instead. Uematsu was also initially going to create the theme song for Final Fantasy XIII (2010). However, after being assigned the task of creating the entire score of Final Fantasy XIV, Uematsu decided to hand the job over to Hamauzu.

Uematsu also works closely with Sakaguchi's development studio Mistwalker, and has composed for Blue Dragon (2006), Lost Odyssey (2007), Away: Shuffle Dungeon (2008); The Last Story (2011); and Terra Battle (2014). He also wrote music for the cancelled game Cry On. Uematsu created the main theme for Super Smash Bros. Brawl in 2008. He then composed the music for the 2009 anime Guin Saga; this marked the first time he provided a full score for an animated series. Uematsu has contributed music and story to e-books, such as "Blik-0 1946".

Uematsu appeared five times in the top 20 of the annual Classic FM Hall of Fame. In 2012, "Aerith's Theme", written by Uematsu for Final Fantasy VII, was voted into the number 16 position in the annual Classic FM (UK) "Hall of Fame" top 300 chart. This was accompanied by "Dancing Mad" and "To Zanarkand". It was the first time that a piece of music written for a video game had appeared in the chart. In 2013, music from the Final Fantasy series received even greater support and was voted into the third position on the Classic FM Hall of Fame. Uematsu and his Final Fantasy music subsequently appeared at number seven in 2014, number nine in 2015, and number 17 in 2016.

In September 2018, Uematsu announced that he would take a hiatus in order to recover from work fatigue, which led to him being hospitalized. He composed the main theme for 2020's Final Fantasy VII Remake, "Hollow". Sakaguchi said that Uematsu's work on 2021's Fantasian could be his last major game score due to health issues. In a video posted to the Fantasian Twitter account on October 15, 2024, Uematsu announced that this was his last project as a video game composer. This was later clarified on his Twitter account that he was not retiring from video game music entirely, but rather scaling back his involvement. He explained that while he would no longer take on full game soundtracks due to the time commitment, he would still be open to composing individual pieces, such as theme songs. Merregnon: Heart of Ice, a symphonic fairy tale scored by Uematsu and recorded by the London Symphony Orchestra, was released by Decca Records on June 19, 2026.

== Concerts ==
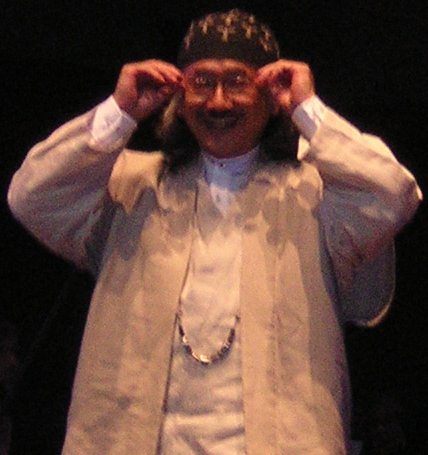
Uematsu at a Distant Worlds concert in 2009

Uematsu's video game compositions have been performed in numerous concerts, and various Final Fantasy concerts have also been held. Outside Japan, Uematsu's Final Fantasy music was performed live for the first time at the first event of the 2003 Symphonic Game Music Concert in Leipzig, Germany. Other events of the Symphonic Game Music Concerts featuring Final Fantasy music were held in 2004, 2006, and 2007. The concert in 2004 featured a world premiere of Those Who Fight from Final Fantasy VII. Japanese pianist Seiji Honda was invited to perform the arrangement together with the orchestra. Another world premiere was "Dancing Mad" from Final Fantasy VI, performed by orchestra, choir, and pipe organ. The event in 2007 included "Distant Worlds" from Final Fantasy XI, performed by Japanese opera soprano Izumi Masuda.

A series of successful concert performances were held in Japan, including a Final Fantasy concert series titled Tour de Japon. The first stateside concert, Dear Friends – Music from Final Fantasy, took place on May 10, 2004, at the Walt Disney Concert Hall in Los Angeles, California, and was performed by the Los Angeles Philharmonic orchestra and the Los Angeles Master Chorale. It was conducted by Fort Worth Symphony Orchestra director Miguel Harth-Bedoya. Due to a positive reception, a concert series for North America followed. On May 16, 2005, a follow-up concert called More Friends: Music from Final Fantasy was performed in Los Angeles at the Gibson Amphitheatre; the concert was conducted by Arnie Roth.

Uematsu's Final Fantasy music was presented in the concert Voices – Music from Final Fantasy, which took place on February 18, 2006, at the Pacifico Yokohama convention center. Star guests included Emiko Shiratori, Rikki, Izumi Masuda, and Angela Aki. The concert focused on the songs from the Final Fantasy series and was conducted by Arnie Roth. Uematsu and several of his fellow composers were in attendance at the world premiere of Play! A Video Game Symphony in Chicago in May 2006; he composed the opening fanfare for the concert.

== Works ==
Video games
Year	Title	Role(s)	Ref.
1986	Cruise Chaser Blassty	Music with Takashi Uno	
1986	Alpha	Music	
1986	King's Knight	Music	
1986	Suishō no Dragon	Music	
1987	3-D WorldRunner	Music	
1987	Apple Town Story	Music	
1987	Genesis	Music	
1987	Aliens: Alien 2	Music	
1987	Cleopatra no Mahō	Music	
1987	Rad Racer	Music	
1987	Nakayama Miho no Tokimeki High School	Music with Toshiaki Imai	
1987	JJ: Tobidase Daisakusen Part II	Music	
1987	Final Fantasy	Music	
1988	Hanjuku Hero	Music	
1988	Final Fantasy II	Music	
1989	Square's Tom Sawyer	Music	
1989	The Final Fantasy Legend	Music	
1990	Final Fantasy III	Music	
1990	Rad Racer II	Music	
1990	Final Fantasy Legend II	Music with Kenji Ito	
1991	Final Fantasy IV	Music	
1992	Romancing SaGa	Arrangement of "Wipe Your Tears"	
1992	Final Fantasy V	Music	
1994	Final Fantasy VI	Music	
1995	Chrono Trigger	Music with Yasunori Mitsuda	
1996	Dynami Tracer	Music	
1996	Front Mission: Gun Hazard	Music with Yasunori Mitsuda, Masashi Hamauzu, and Junya Nakano	
1997	Final Fantasy VII	Music	
1999	Final Fantasy VIII	Music	
2000	Final Fantasy IX	Music	
2001	Final Fantasy X	Music with Masashi Hamauzu and Junya Nakano	
2002	Final Fantasy XI	Music with Naoshi Mizuta and Kumi Tanioka	
2003	Final Fantasy Tactics Advance	Main theme	
2003	Hanjuku Hero Tai 3D	Music	
2005	Hanjuku Hero 4: 7-Jin no Hanjuku Hero	Music with several others	
2005	Egg Monster Hero	Music	
2006	Final Fantasy XII	Ending theme "Kiss Me Good-Bye"	
2006	Blue Dragon	Music	
2007	Anata o Yurusanai	Music with several others	
2007	Lost Odyssey	Music	
2008	Super Smash Bros. Brawl	Main theme	
2008	Lord of Vermilion	Music	
2008	Blue Dragon Plus	Music	
2008	Away: Shuffle Dungeon	Main theme	
2009	Blue Dragon: Awakened Shadow	Music	
2009	Sakura Note	Music	
2009	Kurulin Fusion	Music director	
2010	Lord of Vermilion II	Opening theme "Dawn of Vermilion 2"	
2010	Final Fantasy XIV	Music	
2010	Lord of Arcana	Music with Kenichiro Fukui and Satoshi Henmi	
2011	The Last Story	Music	
2011	Unchained Blades	Main theme	
2012	Jyuzaengi: Engetsu Sangokuden	Music with Kevin Penkin	
2012	Hyperdimension Neptunia Victory	Music with Kenji Kaneko and Kenji Ito	
2012	Unchained Blades EXXiV	Music with Tsutomu Narita, Michio Okamiya, and Yoshitaka Hirota	
2012	Fantasy Life	Music	
2013	Norn9	"Ark of Destiny - World in the Norn"	
2013	Lord of Vermilion III	Main theme "Code : Vermilion"	
2013	Ragnarok Odyssey Ace	"Roar of the Black Dragon"	
2013	Fairy Fencer F	Music with several others	
2013	Hometown Story	Music with Tsutomu Narita	
2013	Oceanhorn: Monster of Uncharted Seas	Music with Kalle Ylitalo and Kenji Ito	
2013	Wonder Flick	Music	
2014	Granblue Fantasy	Music with Tsutomu Narita	
2014	Tokyo Twilight Ghost Hunters	Opening theme "Shoot That Crimson Sky"	
2014	Terra Battle	Music	
2015	Megadimension Neptunia VII	Main theme	
2015	Chunithm: Seelisch Tact	"Theme of Seelish Tact"	
2015	Final Fantasy XIV: Heavensward	Main theme "Dragonsong"	
2015	Fairy Fencer F: Advent Dark Force	Music with several others	
2016	Super Senso	Music	
2017	Terra Battle 2	Music	
2017	Final Fantasy XIV: Stormblood	Main theme "Revolutions"	
2017	Final Fantasy XV: Comrades	"Choosing Hope"	
2019	Terra Wars	Music	
2020	Final Fantasy VII Remake	Main theme "Hollow"	
2021	Fantasian	Music	
2021	Dungeon Encounters	Music director	
2022	Fairy Fencer F: Refrain Chord	Main theme	
2024	Final Fantasy VII Rebirth	Main theme "No Promises to Keep"	
2025	Fantasy Life i: The Girl Who Steals Time	Music with Haruno Ito	

Film/anime
Year	Title	Role(s)	Ref.
2000	Ah! My Goddess: The Movie	Main theme	
2005	Final Fantasy VII: Advent Children	Music with Keiji Kawamori, Kenichiro Fukui, and Tsuyoshi Sekito	
2007	Blue Dragon	Main theme	
2009	Guin Saga	Music	
2012	Fairy Tail the Movie: The Phoenix Priestess	Ending theme "Surely Forever"	
2017	Granblue Fantasy The Animation	Music with Tsutomu Narita and Yasunori Nishiki	

Other
Year	Title	Role(s)	Ref.
1993	Final Fantasy V Dear Friends	Music	
1994	Final Fantasy VI Special Tracks	Music	
1994	Phantasmagoria	Music	
1998	Ten Plants	"Forget the Dream of Tomorrow"	
1999	Ten Plants 2: Children Songs	"Tomorrow's Weather"	
2003	The Black Mages	Music, keyboards	
2004	Dark Chronicle Premium Arrange	Arrangement of "Flame Demon Monster Gaspard"	
2004	The Black Mages II: The Skies Above	Music, keyboards	
2008	The Black Mages III: Darkness and Starlight	Music, keyboards	
2010	Nobuo Uematsu's 10 Short Stories	Music, story	
2011	Earthbound Papas: Octave Theory	Music with Earthbound Papas	
2011	Play for Japan: The Album	"Every New Morning"	
2012	Reiki Japan	Music	
2013	Blik-0 1946	Music, story	
2013	Earthbound Papas: Dancing Dad	Music with Earthbound Papas	
2022	Modulation - Final Fantasy Arrangement Album	Music	
2024	Merregnon: Heart of Ice	Music	

== Musical style and influences ==
The style of Uematsu's compositions is diverse, ranging from stately classical symphonic pieces and heavy metal to new-age and hyper-percussive techno-electronica. For example, in Lost Odyssey, the score ranges from classical orchestral arrangements to contemporary jazz and techno tracks. Uematsu has stated that he is a big fan of Celtic and Irish music, and some of his work contains elements from these musical styles. Uematsu's Final Fantasy scores vary from upbeat, to dark and angry, to melancholic in nature. For instance, the music of Final Fantasy VIII is dark and gloomy, while the soundtrack to Final Fantasy IX is more carefree and upbeat. His Final Fantasy music has been described as being able to convey the true emotion of a scene; an example is "Aerith's Theme" from Final Fantasy VII. In an interview with the Nichi Bei Times, Uematsu said "I don't really self-consciously compose music for Japan or for the world, but I do think there is something in my more melancholy pieces that has a distinctly Japanese quality." He has been named one of the "Innovators" in Time's "Time 100: The Next Wave — Music" feature. He has also been called the "John Williams of the video game world" and been credited for "increasing the appreciation and awareness" of video game music.

Many of Uematsu's musical influences come from the United Kingdom and the United States. He cites Elton John as his biggest musical influence, and he has stated that he wanted to be like him. Other major inspirations include the Beatles, Emerson, Lake & Palmer, Simon & Garfunkel, and progressive rock bands. In the classical genre, he cites Pyotr Ilyich Tchaikovsky as a great influence. Uematsu has said that 1970s bands, such as Pink Floyd and King Crimson, influenced his Final Fantasy compositions. The lyrics for the piece "One-Winged Angel" from Final Fantasy VII were taken from the medieval poetry on which Carl Orff based his cantata Carmina Burana, specifically the songs "Estuans Interius", "O Fortuna", "Veni, Veni, Venias" and "Ave Formosissima". In turn, Uematsu has had a major influence on video game music and beyond the video game industry as well. For example, "Liberi Fatali" from Final Fantasy VIII was played during the 2004 Summer Olympics in Athens during the women's synchronized swimming event. From the same game, "Eyes on Me", featuring Chinese pop singer Faye Wong, sold a record 400,000 copies and was the first song from a video game to win an award at the Japan Gold Disc Awards, where it won "Song of the Year (International)" in 2000. Uematsu said that he gets more inspiration from walking his dog than from listening to other music.

== Personal life ==
Uematsu resides in Tokyo with his wife, Reiko, whom he met during college. They have a summer cabin in Yamanakako, Yamanashi. In his spare time, he enjoys watching professional wrestling, drinking beer, and bicycling. Uematsu has said he originally wanted to become a professional wrestler, mentioning it was a career dream when he was younger. He became a fan of the Chicago Bears after meeting Mike Ditka.
