= Alpha (video game) =

1986 video game

- Developer: Square
- Publisher: Square
- Writer: Hiromichi Tanaka
- Composer: Nobuo Uematsu
- Platforms: PC-88, PC-98, FM-7, Sharp X1
- Release: JP: July 8, 1986
- Genres: Visual novel, adventure
- Mode: Single-player

Alpha is an adventure game developed and published by Square. It was released for the PC-88, PC-98, FM-7, and Sharp X1 systems in 1986. Alpha uses a text parser to interpret the player's instructions and displays the results on screen.

== Gameplay ==
Academics have described the game as a visual novel and as a adventure game.

A screenshot of Alpha from the NEC PC-8801 version of the game. The game allows for text-input at the bottom of the screen to control gameplay.

The storyline of Alpha progresses as the player inputs short commands carried out by the game's heroine. Similarly to another interactive fiction game by Square, The Death Trap, but contrary to most games in the genre, the situations confronted by the main character are presented in still pictures. The text is displayed within a white-bordered blue background, also present in message windows of the early Final Fantasy installments. Hidden characters appear in the background of most scenes, and such as a ninja appearing outside a car window.

== Plot ==
Alpha is set in the future after the Earth's natural resources have been completely drained. Humanity is forced to embark on a centuries-long trip to the titular planet on the space ship Daedalus. Because technology for suspended animation does not exist, only the distant descendants of the original passengers and crew are alive by the time the game takes place. The main character, Chris, begins the game with amnesia and a terrorist attack quickly draws her into a revolution which aims to overthrow the dictatorial Daedalus computer system. As Chris interacts with the revolutionary group, she uncovers the true nature of Alpha, the Daedalus, and herself.

== Development ==
Alpha development began in January 1986. The game features animation techniques. Artist Kazuko Shibuya did illustrations for the Alpha game manual. Nobuo Uematsu was in charge of background music.

Alpha is one of Nobuo Uematsu's earliest video game soundtracks. A promotional soundtrack was released on flexi disc on August 7, 1986. It contains the tracks "Prologue ~Theme from Alpha~" and "CHRIS". The game was praised at its release for its animation quality and the rich facial expressions of its characters. A prison sequence that is repeated multiple times throughout the game became notorious among fans for depicting Chris naked.

== Reception ==
Alpha was unique in that it was an eroge, or erotic, title from game developer Square. The game is noted for its difficulty, in that there are points where if the player loses an important item, they may not be able to retrieve it again, and if players make a mistake at crucial scenes, there is no opportunity to do it over. The game does not end if these things happen, but players can progress no further in the game either. In 2014, the game was released on a retro gaming distribution service called "Project EGG".

== See also ==
- List of Square video games
