= The Death Trap =

1984 video game

- Promotional art
- Developer: Square
- Publisher: Square
- Designers: Hironobu Sakaguchi; Hiromichi Tanaka
- Platforms: PC-8801, PC-9801, FM-7
- Release: JP: October 1984
- Genre: Interactive fiction
- Mode: Single-player

The Death Trap (Note: Japanese: ザ・デストラップ) is a text adventure developed and published by Square for the PC-8801, PC-9801, and FM-7 in 1984. The game and its supporting computer platforms were only released in Japan. The Death Trap is the first game developed by Square, created before they were even an independent company. At the time, Square was a software branch of Den-Yu-Sha, a Japanese power line manufacturing firm; it was not until 1986 that Square was independently established.

Square released a sequel in 1985 called Will: The Death Trap II. Square's third and final text adventure game was called Alpha, released in 1986, and tells a science fiction story in the same style as The Death Trap.

== Gameplay ==
The Death Trap is a silent (no sound) text parser adventure game, which relies on simple command lines from the user's input to progress through the game. As opposed to most "text adventures", with only text as output, The Death Trap provides graphical feedback using full screen still images.

== Plot ==
The game's plot revolves around a spy in an African country during a civil war. The story also involves biological warfare.

The game's plot is set during the 1980s. In the game, the Cold War has become tense, and many countries have begun to prepare for a global-scale war, working on new weapons. One of such countries is the mysterious "B country" in Eastern Africa, which in an attempt to create biological weapons kidnaps the famous scientist Dr. Gitanes. An agent named Benson is sent to B country in order to rescue the doctor and avert the new threat to world peace.

== Development ==
The Death Trap was the first game developed by Square, a computer game software branch of Den-Yū-Sha Electric Company. Masashi Miyamoto, who founded Square in September 1983, believed that it would be more efficient to have graphic designers, programmers and writers work together on common projects. Upon Square's inception, Miyamoto initially hired as their first developers university students Hironobu Sakaguchi and Hiromichi Tanaka, and a few others. They shortly began work on Square's first game, The Death Trap. Sakaguchi noted in 1985 that he had expected to only do clerical work, not develop video games, yet was appointed a producer for the game. Sakaguchi was also a scenario writer for The Death Trap even though he too was a part time employee who had just left university. Harunobu Kato and Tanaka served as programmers. Other scenario writers were Miki Yukinoura, Akihiro Hayashi and Takashi Suzuki. The graphics team consisted of Hiromi Nakada, Miki Yukinoura, Miho Imaizumi and Tomoko Saito, while Yasuyo Ide held the position of data editing. During the creation of The Death Trap all of Squares' staff were part time.

Halfway through development, Sakaguchi reached out to a part time cassette rental store employee named Nobuo Uematsu that Sakaguchi had previously met and received a demo tape from. The game was published in Japan for the NEC PC-8801 in October 1984 and later released for the Fujitsu FM-7 in December. The game was the first game released in Japan that allowed both Japanese and English text entry during gameplay, as all previous Japanese games were done in English to be like games released on the Apple II. During this period, The Death Trap was one of three games that made within two years, which was a fast pace of development.

There were two editions of the game with two different cover arts, the first of which is now super rare. The game was unique among titles of the time for introducing full-screen images.

== Reception ==
The Death Trap received little attention at the time of release, though it was successful enough for Square to immediately go on to create a sequel: Will: The Death Trap II. Hironobu Sakaguchi, Hiromichi Tanaka, Harunobu Kato and Hiromi Nakada continued developing games for Square, while the rest of those credited left.

Retrospective examination from PC Gamer called the game's art "rudimentary". USGamer described the plot as a Cold War era spy thriller.

Project EGG, a licensed emulator for home computer games, included The Death Trap, Will, and Alpha together in its limited edition "Classic PC-Game Collection" on September 8, 2013, alongside Cruise Chaser Blassty and Genesis—other Square games released between 1984 and 1987.

== Will: The Death Trap II ==
Will: The Death Trap II
- Developer: Square
- Publisher: Square
- Designer: Hironobu Sakaguchi
- Platform: NEC PC-8801, NEC PC-9801, Fujitsu FM-7, Sharp X1
- Release: JP: June 1985
- Genres: Interactive fiction, adventure game
- Mode: Single-player

Will: The Death Trap II (Note: Japanese: ウィル デス・トラップII) was a sequel to the original The Death Trap, developed and published by Square for the NEC PC-8801, NEC PC-9801, Fujitsu FM-7, and Sharp X1 in 1985. The game and its supporting computer platforms were released exclusively in Japan, and it was the second video game developed by Square.

Sakaguchi once again wrote the game's scenario, and has explained that he used The Death Trap as the basis of the game and "beefed up the story, the universe, and the game system" for the sequel. Sakaguchi, the returning Harunobu Kato, and programmer Shun Saigusa developed the code for the game; additionally they brought in 16-year-old game developer Akihiro Yoshida to help push the envelope of the more complex bitmap graphics used in Will. As a result of these efforts, one of the game's advertising slogans was "Instant screen display in 0.5 seconds!" communicating the speed at which it could render its animations in comparison to its peers. Upon release, the game was remarked at the time for the "cel animation style" quality of scenes like the character blinking animation on the title screen, something the new graphic rendering speed and sophistication allowed the game's art to achieve.

Much like its predecessor, Will is an interactive fiction game, which relies on simple command lines from the user's input to progress through the game. Players are given a map of the island that is the game's setting and visual depictions of each location they visit, and interact with various objects & characters to progress the story.

The player takes on the role of Agent Benson from the original game, now deployed to Torinia Island to respond to a mysterious threat from computer scientist Dr Howard to destroy the world with nuclear weapons. Benson investigates the island to disable the weapons with the help of Aisha, a female android created by Dr Howard, and the story features themes of artificial intelligence and "what separates man from machines"; common tropes in science fiction in this era.

Will sold 100,000 copies in Japan, which was a major commercial success at the time of its release. The game is also considered to be Square's first hit.
