= Kalin no Tsurugi =

1987 video game

- Developer: Xtalsoft
- Publisher: Square
- Platform: Famicom Disk System
- Release: JP: October 2, 1987
- Genre: Action role-playing
- Mode: Single-player

Kalin no Tsurugi (カリーンの剣; "The Sword of Kalin") is an action-RPG developed by Xtalsoft and published by Square's publishing label Disk Original Group (DOG) for the Family Computer Disk System in Japan in 1987.

== The story ==
Kalin no Tsurugi takes place in the peaceful Altenia Kingdom. Recently, however, monsters have been appearing. To help combat these monsters, the King calls forth his best knight: the player, who must find the mage Gladrif and defeat the monsters terrorizing the townspeople.

== Reception ==
Reception

Review score
Publication	Score
Famitsu	25/40
