= Xtalsoft =

Japanese video game company

Xtalsoft Co., Ltd.
- Company type: Public (defunct)
- Industry: Video game industry
- Founded: 1982
- Defunct: 1990
- Headquarters: Japan
- Products: See complete products listing

Xtalsoft (クリスタルソフト) was a Japanese software house established in 1982 to develop games for Japanese computers. Most of Xtalsoft's games are traditional role-playing games, with gameplay similar to that of Eye of the Beholder.

In July 1986, Xtalsoft was among six other companies to form the Disk Original Group, a collective publishing house for Famicom Disk System games headed by Square For their part, Xtalsoft developed Sword of Kalin under the Disk Original Group.

At the dawn of the 90s, Xtalsoft was experiencing management difficulties, and on October 1, 1990, they combined with T&E Soft to form T&E Soft's Osaka development department.

Xtalsoft's name is a blend of "crystal software," where "crystal" is abbreviated with the letter X, a common jargon abbreviation in written English. Originally, their name was written with an apostrophe as "X'TAL SOFT."

Currently, all Xtalsoft IPs are owned by D4 Enterprise.

== Games ==
Only Babylon (Curse of Babylon in the US) was ever released outside Japan, although some, such as Sword of Kalin, have been unofficially translated by fans.

In 2023, a fan translation of Aspic: Curse of the Snakelord was released.
