= Hanjuku Hero =

Video game series

Hanjuku Hero (半熟英雄, Hanjuku Hīrō; "Soft-Boiled Hero") (Note: The kanji would normally be read eiyū, but furigana (not displayed) indicate the intended reading.) is a Japan-exclusive series of real-time strategy video games. It is directed by Takashi Tokita and published by Square Enix (formerly Square). The series contains four main titles and a spin-off game. The main titles are Hanjuku Hero (1988), Hanjuku Hero: Aa, Sekaiyo Hanjukunare...! (1992), Hanjuku Hero Tai 3D (2003), and Hanjuku Hero 4: 7-Nin no Hanjuku Hero (2005). The spin-off is a Nintendo DS game called Egg Monster Hero (2005), which is a role-playing game with an emphasis on touch-based gameplay. The series is known for its humor and is centered on Lord Almamoon, the protagonist who must save his country from danger in each game.

== Games ==
=== Hanjuku Hero ===
Hanjuku Hero
- Developer: Square
- Publisher: Square
- Director: Kazuhiko Aoki
- Producer: Masafumi Miyamoto
- Designer: Kazuhiko Aoki
- Artists: Hiromi Nakada; Takashi Tokita; Masanori Hoshino
- Composer: Nobuo Uematsu
- Platform: Famicom
- Release: JP: December 2, 1988
- Genre: Real-time strategy
- Mode: Single-player

Hanjuku Hero (半熟英雄, Hanjuku Hīrō; "Soft-Boiled Hero") is the first game in the series, released in 1988 for Famicom. It was re-released on the Virtual Console in 2007 for the Wii, in 2013 for the Nintendo 3DS and in April 2014 for the Wii U.

Although the game did not receive a stand-alone soundtrack album release, a bonus disc of 17 tracks from the game was included in the soundtrack album to Hanjuku Hero VS 3D, featuring some of the earliest work by Nobuo Uematsu of later Final Fantasy fame.

=== Hanjuku Hero: Aa, Sekaiyo Hanjukunare...! ===
Hanjuku Hero: Aa, Sekaiyo Hanjukunare...!
- Developer: Square
- Publisher: Square
- Producer: Kazuhiko Aoki
- Designer: Yasuyuki Hasabe
- Artist: Kazuyuki Kurashima
- Writer: Takashi Tokita
- Composer: Koichi Sugiyama
- Platforms: Super Famicom, WonderSwan Color, iOS, Android
- Release: Super Famicom: JP: December 19, 1992; WonderSwan Color: JP: February 14, 2002; iOS, Android: JP: October 19, 2017
- Genre: Real-time strategy
- Mode: Single-player

Hanjuku Hero: Aa, Sekaiyo Hanjukunare...! (半熟英雄 ああ、世界よ半熟なれ…!! "Let the world become soft-boiled!") is the second game in the series. The Egg Monsters featured in the game are parodies of Final Fantasy IV characters. The game was re-released on the WonderSwan Color in 2002. This version features a graphical overhaul and twelve new summons. The game was re-released once again for iOS and Android in 2017.

A soundtrack album for the game, titled Divertimento Hanjuku Hero, was released by NTT Publishing on January 21, 1993. It features four orchestral renderings of songs from the soundtrack, and 42 tracks from the original soundtrack, composed by Dragon Quest series composer, Koichi Sugiyama.

=== Hanjuku Hero Tai 3D ===
Hanjuku Hero Tai 3D
- Developer: Square Enix PDD 7
- Publisher: Square Enix
- Director: Takashi Tokita
- Producer: Takashi Tokita
- Designers: Takashi Tokita; Kazuyuki Kurashima
- Composer: Nobuo Uematsu
- Platform: PlayStation 2
- Release: JP: June 26, 2003
- Genre: Real-time strategy
- Mode: Single-player

Hanjuku Hero Tai 3D (半熟英雄 対 3D; "Soft-Boiled Hero vs. 3D") is the first title in the series to be in 3D. Lord Almamoon and his kingdom are sucked into an alternate 3-dimensional world and must fight off polygonal Egg Monsters. A limited edition of the game was released alongside the standard edition, and included merchandise such as playing cards, an egg monster sheet, and a sketchbook. The game sold 151,000 copies the week of its release.

A soundtrack album for the game, titled Hanjuku Hero VS 3D OST, was released by DigiCube on June 25, 2003. It features two discs of tracks from this game, totaling 58 tracks and 1:50:27, and a bonus disc of tracks from the original Hanjuku Hero game, 17:57 long and with 17 tracks. Patrick Gann of RPGFan praised the quirky and referential album, which features humorous vocal songs, musical allusions to Final Fantasy tracks, and numerous puns in the track titles. Additionally, a single for the game's theme song was released by DigiCube on April 23 the same year, with the theme song "Fight! Hanjuku Hero", the song "Without Yolk...", and instrumental versions of the two, totaling 16:02 in duration.

=== Egg Monster Hero ===
Egg Monster Hero
- Developer: Neverland
- Publisher: Square Enix
- Director: Masahide Miyata
- Producer: Takashi Tokita
- Designer: Takashi Tokita
- Composer: Nobuo Uematsu
- Platforms: Nintendo DS, mobile phone
- Release: Nintendo DS: JP: March 24, 2005; Mobile: JP: June 6, 2005
- Genre: Action
- Mode: Single-player

Egg Monster Hero (エッグモンスターHERO) is a role playing game spin-off of the Hanjuku Hero. Between Egg Monster invasions, Lord Almamoon has begun slacking off. In order to counteract this, his minister Sebastian sends him to an island to train, which kicks off the story. Egg Monster Hero was released on the Nintendo DS in Japan on March 24, 2005, and was the first game Square Enix published for that console. Players primarily interact using the stylus to drag Egg Monsters towards the enemy and perform special attacks. A mobile phone version of the game became available in Japan on June 6. The game was intended for a North American release but ultimately canceled due to poor reception by focus groups. It was the 141st best-selling game of 2005 in Japan, selling 92,096 copies.

=== Hanjuku Hero 4: 7-Nin no Hanjuku Hero ===
Hanjuku Hero 4: 7-Nin no Hanjuku Hero
- Developer: Square Enix PDD 7
- Publisher: Square Enix
- Director: Takashi Tokita
- Producer: Takashi Tokita
- Designer: Takashi Tokita
- Composers: Nobuo Uematsu; Kenji Ito; Tsuyoshi Sekito; Hirosato Noda; Naoshi Mizuta; Ai Yamashita; Kenichiro Fukui
- Platform: PlayStation 2
- Release: JP: April 26, 2005
- Genre: Real-time strategy
- Mode: Single-player

Hanjuku Hero 4: 7-Nin no Hanjuku Hero (半熟英雄4 ～7人の半熟英雄～; "Hanjuku Hero 4: The 7 Hanjuku Heroes") was released for the PlayStation 2 in Japan on April 26, 2005. It was released in a normal edition as well as a limited edition titled Hanjuku Ginga Bentō (半熟銀河弁当; Hanjuku Galaxy Lunch) which contained a lunch box and promotional items. In this game, Lord Almamoon discovers that he has been tricked into marrying the princess of the Katri Kingdom, who is considered to be the ugliest woman in the world. The game contains two types of battles: 100 on 100 battle using a mix of 2D and 3D, and three-on-three party-based Egg Monster vs. Egg Monster battles.

Composers Nobuo Uematsu, Kenji Ito, Tsuyoshi Sekito, Hirosato Noda, Naoshi Mizuta, and Ai Yamashita did the soundtrack of the game. Uematsu has a cameo appearance within the game, along with Sekito and Kenichiro Fukui, both of whom were members of his former band, The Black Mages. The limited edition of the game came with a two-disc soundtrack album for the game, titled Hanjuku Hero 4 - The 7 Heroes- ~Sound Collection~. The album contains 43 tracks and covers a duration of 1:51:42.

== Reception ==
Review scores of the Hanjuku Hero series have been fairly good. The Japanese magazine Famitsu has scored the WonderSwan version of Hanjuku Hero: Aa, Sekaiyo Hanjukunare...! a 30.

By February 1994, sales of the first two Hanjuku Hero games had totaled 400,000 units in Japan.

Hanjuku Hero Tai 3D was the second best-selling game on the day of its release at 49,904 copies. The game sold over 169,000 copies during 2003. Egg Monster Hero debuted on the Japanese Dengeki sales charts at number 6 during the week of its release and stayed in the top 50 until the week of May 31, 2005. The game has managed to sell approximately 92,096 copies as of November 2008. Media Create sales data suggests that Hanjuku Hero 4 sold around 42,819 copies by the week ending on June 5, 2005.
