= Square's Tom Sawyer =

1989 video game

Square no Tom Sawyer
- Developer: Square
- Publisher: Square
- Designers: Nobuyuki Hoshino; Hiroyuki Ito
- Programmers: Keitarou Adachi; Kiyoshi Yoshii; Hiroshi Nakamura
- Artists: Masaaki Miura; Masanori Hoshino; Takashi Tokita
- Writer: Goujin Komori
- Composer: Nobuo Uematsu
- Platform: Family Computer
- Release: JP: November 30, 1989
- Genre: Role-playing
- Mode: Single-player

Square's Tom Sawyer (スクウェアのトム・ソーヤ, Sukuwea no Tomu Sōya) is a role-playing video game produced by Square that was released exclusively in Japan in 1989 for the Family Computer. The game is directly based on Mark Twain's renowned 1876 novel, The Adventures of Tom Sawyer, and was developed in the role-playing video game niche that made Square famous with its acclaimed Final Fantasy series of video games.

== Gameplay ==
In this battle sequence, Tom and Jim fight a snake.

Players control Tom Sawyer and his friends as they join the party, such as Jim and Huck, and they each have RPG game statistics such as health, power, and speed. Characters can choose to equip no weapons, and fight with their fists, but there are a large number of collectible items. Key cards and black magic are also present in the game. The game features an enemy that triggers the reset button on a players controller bringing them back to the title screen.

== Plot and setting ==
Square's Tom Sawyer is based on Mark Twain's 19th century book "The Adventures of Tom Sawyer" and features many characters from that book. The plot takes place in 1855 on the Mississippi River in the fictional town of St. Petersburg, Missouri. The game begins with Tom Sawyer having a dream saying that in a southern location a pirate treasure is buried. Aunt Polly wakes Tom the next morning, and Tom sets out to find the treasure.

== Development ==
Square's Tom Sawyer was scored by famed Final Fantasy composer Nobuo Uematsu, who is described as taking a more "scenic" approach to the game than his previous works. Artist Katsutoshi Fujioka worked on the game title as well. Around the time that Sakaguchi was writing scenarios for what would become the original Final Fantasy, Hiromichi Tanaka decided to make a game based on "Tom Sawyer" at the same time and formed a team to make it. Takashi Tokita developed some of the graphics, and designed Tom Sawyer as well, but working on the game was difficult for Square to do as teams struggled to finish both games at once, and help was given by the different teams to complete the titles.

Being released between Final Fantasy II and III, the game was similar to the former in that there was no experience point system. Many of the gameplay systems were later seen in an evolved form in the SaGa series. Goto Komori, a detective writer, created the games scenarios. The game had the name "Square" added to the front as another video game about Tom Sawyer came out earlier the same year. Tom hunting for buried treasure is a plot point taken from the original story. According to Nobuo Uematsu, the game was not immediately released after it was completed, and came out a long time after in order to avoid big game releases by Square or their rivals.

== Reception and legacy ==
Speaking to Tom, Jim displays a typical blackface caricature.

The game was never localized outside Japan, and was noted by IGN as an example of racism in video games. In 2010, UGO ranked it as the #4 most racist video game in history.

The portrayal of black people as blackfaced caricatures with huge lips has been noted about the game. In GameSpy's retrospective overview of the Famicom, Benjamin Turner and Christian Nutt's Square column concludes that "one of the most amusing Square games that didn't come [to the U.S.] was Square's Tom Sawyer, an RPG starring the happy-go-lucky boy wonder that featured a...racially insensitive...character". Artist Takashi Tokita explained in 2018 that when the game was made, there was not a "standards and practices" department to ensure that games did not contain materials that would be offensive in other cultures.
