= Cleopatra no Mahō =

1987 video game

- Developer: Square
- Publisher: Square
- Director: Hiromichi Tanaka
- Artist: Takashi Tokita
- Composer: Nobuo Uematsu
- Platform: Family Computer Disk System
- Release: JP: 24 July 1987
- Genre: Role-playing
- Mode: Single-player

Cleopatra no Mahō (クレオパトラの魔宝, Kureopatora no Mahō; lit. "Cursed Treasure of Cleopatra") is a role-playing video game developed and published by Square for the Family Computer Disk System, and released in Japan on 24 July 1987. The game's music was composed by Nobuo Uematsu.

== Gameplay ==
Players explore an Egyptian town and ruins from a first-person perspective. The game combines role-playing game elements with an adventure game-like interface. Players may purchase items from shops, though some shopkeepers must be defeated in battle before trading. Battles are turn-based, with options to fight, use items, or flee. Players accumulate experience points by succeeding in battle and "level up" after gaining enough experience, which increases their stamina. Randomly encountered battles with enemies may happen at any time, including when paused to examine the inventory.

== Plot ==
The player character, Daisuke Kusano, is the son of an archaeologist who disappeared while searching for the Tears of Isis, artifacts once owned by Cleopatra. During the man's excavation for the Tears, demons appeared and abducted him. The boy soon learns that he must find the Tears in order to save his father. Over the course of the adventure, Daisuke visits the Great Sphinx of Giza, the Temple of Kom Ombo, a tower of sand, and an underground labyrinth. At the end of the game, he discovers that the demons had been disguised as the kindly shopkeeper. Daisuke receives the last Tear of Isis upon defeating the demons, which summons the ghost of Cleopatra, who releases Daisuke's father from imprisonment.

== Development ==
Nobuo Uematsu composed the music for the game. When developing the game for both the Famicom and the Famicom Disk System (FDS), there were technical differences such as a smaller amount of memory on the FDS which led to a more difficult process creating the same graphics.

== Reception ==
Reception

Review score
Publication	Score
Famitsu	26/40

Famitsu appreciated the game's graphics and animations, and called the characters "cute". ITmedia Gamez also complimented the game's animations, though felt that too much of the disk's capacity was devoted to these animations at the cost of game length. However, the reviewer thought it was not a bad game, even though it was short, and compared it favorably to The Warlock of Firetop Mountain, an adventure gamebook.
