= Hironobu Sakaguchi =

Japanese video game designer (born 1962)

- 坂口 博信
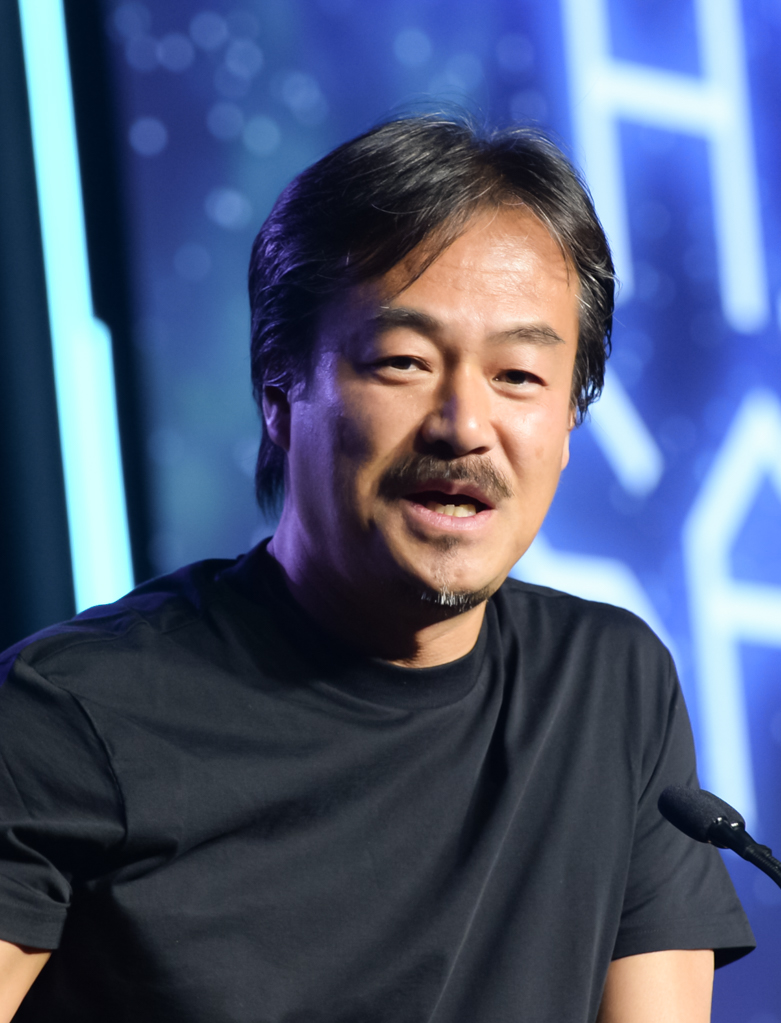
- Sakaguchi at the 2015 Game Developers Choice Awards
- Born: November 25, 1962 (age 63); Hitachi, Ibaraki, Japan
- Occupations: CEO of Mistwalker, game designer
- Employer(s): Square (1983–2003); Mistwalker (2004–present)
- Known for: Final Fantasy series Chrono Trigger; Blue Dragon; Terra Battle

Hironobu Sakaguchi (坂口 博信, Sakaguchi Hironobu; born November 25, 1962) is a Japanese game designer, director, producer, and writer. Originally working for Square (later Square Enix) from 1983 to 2003, he departed the company and founded independent studio Mistwalker in 2004. He is known as the creator of the Final Fantasy franchise, in addition to other titles during his time at Square. At Mistwalker, he is known for creating the Blue Dragon and Terra Battle series among several standalone titles like Lost Odyssey, as well as later moving away from home consoles and creating titles for mobile platforms.

Originally intending to become a musician, he briefly studied electronics and programming, joining Square as a part-time employee, then later a full-time employee when Square became an independent company in 1986. He led the development of several titles before helping to create the original Final Fantasy, which proved highly successful and cemented his status within the company. Following the financial failure of Final Fantasy: The Spirits Within, his debut as a film director, Sakaguchi withdrew from Square's management and eventually resigned in 2003. He continued his game career through Mistwalker, first co-developing projects through external partners and then smaller in-studio mobile projects.

Born in Hitachi, Ibaraki Prefecture, Sakaguchi now lives in Hawaii where one of Mistwalker's offices is based. He has also influenced the creation of several other Square Enix projects, such as Kingdom Hearts. Sakaguchi has received several industry awards.

== Early life ==
Hironobu Sakaguchi was born on November 25, 1962, in Hitachi, a city in Ibaraki Prefecture. His parents were from Kyushu, and he would visit there frequently with his family in his childhood. Notable elements of his youth were finding rock samples in a local quarry and gathering a collection of polished stones from an interested geologist and reading through his mother's large library. He enjoyed playing piano in elementary school, and during high school played the folk guitar and formed an amateur band with some friends and classmates, almost getting himself expelled by selling homemade concert tickets. Having little to no interest in gaming at the time, his aim was to become a musician. He was a computer science major at Yokohama National University, becoming friends with fellow student Hiromichi Tanaka. Through Tanaka, Sakaguchi got access to an Apple II computer on which he played and fell in love with Wizardry, frequently skipping classes to play it.

Sakaguchi's programming studies led him to desire an Apple II of his own. Since he could not afford one, he instead purchased a knockoff in the Akihabara district, which, although cheaper than an actual Apple II, was still expensive. Realizing that he needed funds to buy software for his computer, he began to seek a part-time job to earn the necessary income. In 1983 towards the end of their third university year, Sakaguchi and Tanaka were both looking for part-time work in the electronics sector. They found work with Square, a newly formed subsidiary of electric power conglomerate Den-Yu-Sha, formed by Masafumi Miyamoto to tap into the emerging video game market. Sakaguchi applied as Square was a new company and not as exacting as other larger companies such as Namco and Konami. The interview was quite informal, and Sakaguchi was hired. At this point, Sakaguchi still dreamed of becoming a professional musician but felt that working for a company like Square would provide him with needed programming experience in the meantime.

== Career ==
=== Square (1983–2003) ===
During his time at Square, he was first involved in an unlicensed adaptation of the television game show Torin-ingen, then later became part of the team for The Death Trap. There was no formal reassignment, only an informal restructure that led Sakaguchi to take on a more senior role. Following the success of The Death Trap, he took a leave of absence from university work to continue his work with Square. His first few titles including The Death Trap were for PCs, with his first Nintendo Entertainment System title being King's Knight (1986). Many of these projects, while keeping the company afloat, were not hugely successful and focused on action titles that Sakaguchi disliked. He also earned the reputation of being a hard person to work under. When Square became an independent company in 1986, Sakaguchi was appointed as a full-time employee as Director of Planning and Development. That year, following the release and success of Enix's role-playing video game (RPG) Dragon Quest for the NES, he persuaded Miyamoto to allow production of an RPG by Square. This RPG drew inspiration from multiple fantasy titles of the time including The Legend of Zelda, and Origin Systems's Ultima series.

Sakaguchi described the production as happening in "fits and starts" with a small staff as most of the company did not believe in his project. Production gained momentum during its second half and getting help from Tanaka's team. Initially titled Fighting Fantasy, he changed it to Final Fantasy to both avoid trademark conflicts with the roleplaying gamebook series of the same name and to represent his feelings at the time. Had the title failed commercially, he would have quit Square and completed his university education. In fact, Final Fantasy was an impressive commercial success, selling 400,000 units in Japan, and kickstarting the Final Fantasy series as Square's leading series. Sakaguchi acted as director for the four subsequent entries between 1988 and 1992. He was promoted in 1991 to the position of Executive Vice President, which eventually lessened his creative role in titles, with Final Fantasy V (1992) being his final directorial role with the Final Fantasy series. He notably spearheaded the creation of Chrono Trigger (1995), forming one third of the core "Dream Team" staff alongside Dragon Quest creator Yuji Horii, and Dragon Ball and Dragon Quest artist Akira Toriyama.

He acted as the producer for the company's PlayStation debut Final Fantasy VII (1997), which proved to be a massive financial and critical success. The greater production requirements of the PlayStation meant Sakaguchi became less involved in the creative process, giving greater creative control to Yoshinori Kitase, who had worked with Sakaguchi beginning with Final Fantasy V. For Final Fantasy VIII (1999), he took on the role of executive producer. He acted as producer for some projects including Final Fantasy Tactics (1997) and Parasite Eve (1998). He attempted to outsource development of a Tactics sequel, but the project was cancelled. For Final Fantasy IX (2000), a nostalgic entry which was mainly produced by a team in Honolulu, Hawaii where Sakaguchi was based at the time, he took a greater creative role including producing the title and writing the scenario.

Through this period, Sakaguchi was creating a CGI feature film based on the Final Fantasy franchise called Final Fantasy: The Spirits Within, establishing the in-house studio Square Pictures in 1997 to produce it and other CGI projects. Sakaguchi intended The Spirits Within, his debut as a film director, to be the first of multiple film projects, with lead Aki Ross becoming a virtual actress whose model would be reused in other CGI movies. Due to cost overruns towards the end of production to ensure staff payments amid rising production costs, The Spirits Within cost Square and co-producer Columbia Pictures $137 million. Sakaguchi himself made a cameo appearance in the film. The commitment to The Spirits Within contributed to his less involved role in the main Final Fantasy series. He also planned to create an interactive movie, further bridging the gap between films and video games.

Upon its release in cinemas The Spirits Within grossed just over $85 million, being labelled a box office bomb. The film's failure damaged Square financially, delayed a planned merger between Square and Enix, and prompted the closure of Square Pictures. Following the failure of The Spirits Within, Sakaguchi was left in a state of low morale, and he decided to step away from active involvement in Square's projects. He was also growing tired of his administrative role within Square. In 2001, Sakaguchi resigned from his position at Square along with two other senior executives, signing an agreement to be credited as executive producer on future Final Fantasy projects. While still receiving credits on Final Fantasy, Sakaguchi spent the next three years at his home in Hawaii in a demoralized state, describing himself as "doing nothing" and feeling guilty over his lack of contributions to the industry. He eventually found the motivation to make a return to game production after talking with Toriyama and fellow artist Takehiko Inoue. Sakaguchi officially left Square in 2003, with his last major credited role being on Final Fantasy X-2.

=== Mistwalker (2004–present) ===
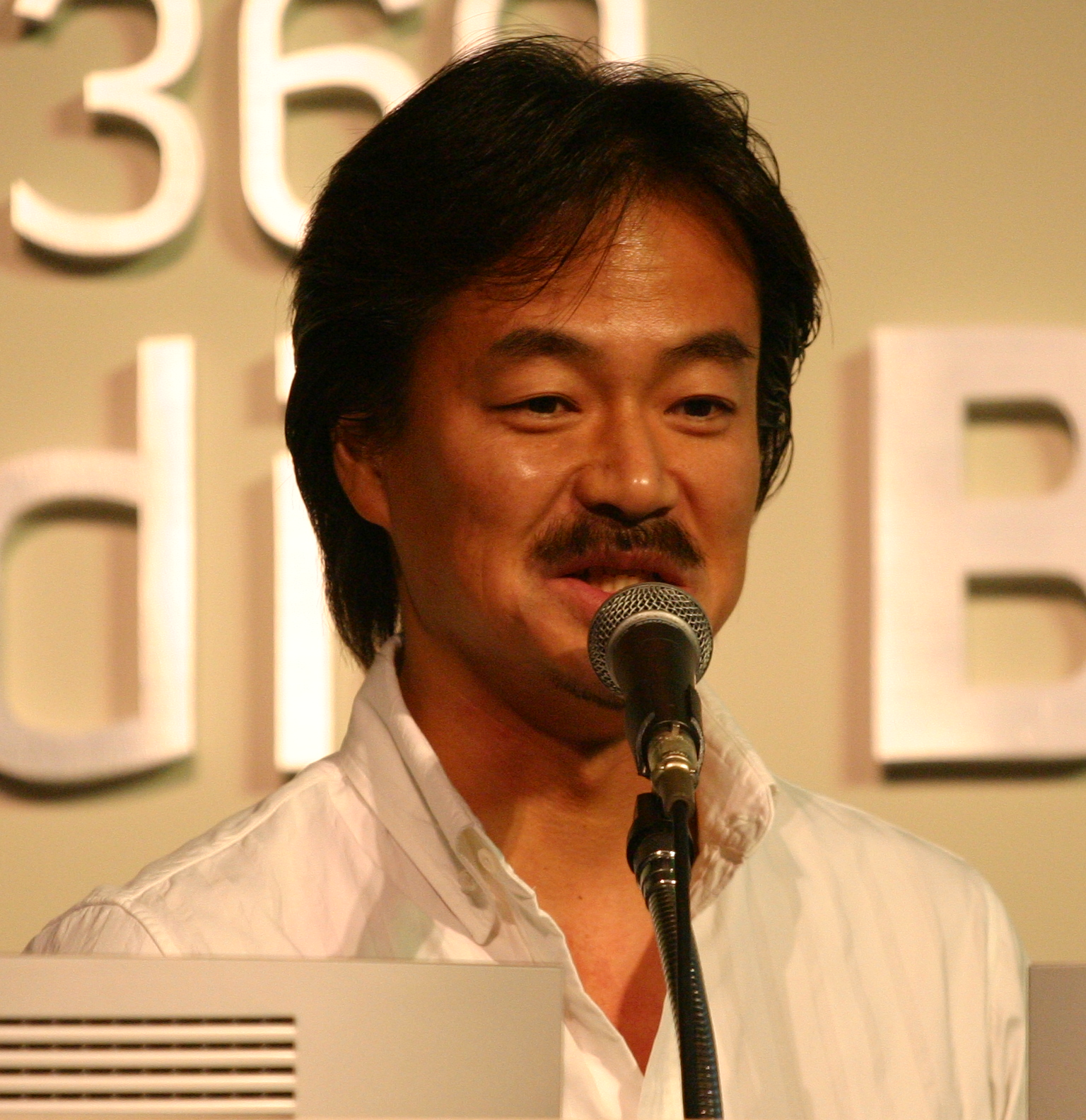
Sakaguchi at the 2006 Tokyo Game Show

Sakaguchi became reinvested in making games again after his talks with Toriyama and Inoue, deciding to create his own studio. His independent studio Mistwalker was established in 2004 with funding help from Microsoft, although the Mistwalker trademark had existed since 2001. Mistwalker is based between Honolulu, Hawaii, and Tokyo, Japan. By this point, Sakaguchi had settled in Honolulu, travelling between there and Japan for game production. Many early Mistwalker titles were for the Xbox 360, a console struggling to find commercial success in Japan. He did not choose the PlayStation 3 due to its difficult production architecture and earlier disagreements with Sony president Ken Kutaragi.

Four titles were announced in 2005. These were Blue Dragon (2006), on which he collaborated with Toriyama and spawned sequels and media spin-offs; ASH: Archaic Sealed Heat (2007), a tactical RPG on which he worked with staff from Final Fantasy XII; Lost Odyssey (2007), which featured artwork from Inoue and narrative elements by Japanese novelist Kiyoshi Shigematsu; and Cry On, a title intended to evoke emotion that was ultimately cancelled in 2008. Sakaguchi returned to a directorial role for The Last Story (2011), which he took as an opportunity to adjust his gameplay approach based on feedback from his earlier titles and to keep up with gaming trends of the time.

Following The Last Story, Sakaguchi wanted Mistwalker to focus on smaller mobile projects they could produce in-house on a small intimate team. His first project was Party Wave, a surfing simulator inspired by Sakaguchi's love of surfing, though this ended up being a commercial disappointment. Inspired by this failure, Sakaguchi re-evaluated the mobile market and began production on Terra Battle, a card-based RPG with a storyline inspired by western television. Terra Battle was a commercial success for the company, prompting Sakaguchi to make plans to release eight games over six years, leading up to his possible retirement age. He created a sequel and spin-off for Terra Battle, and had been planning a third entry and a console version. Eventually all three Terra Battle entries were shut down for various reasons by 2019. During this period, Sakaguchi replayed Final Fantasy VI (1994), rediscovering his love of creating compelling worlds and narratives. With this in mind, he began development of Fantasian (2021), a two-part RPG modelled on Final Fantasy VI with Sakaguchi producing and writing the title for the Apple Arcade service. He created Fantasian on the principle that it might be his last major game project due to his advancing age.

== Design philosophy and themes ==
Sakaguchi liked the design of the original Dragon Quest, attributing his admiration to its scale and ability to create a long adventure with progress saving on hardware other than PCs. This admiration directly inspired his wish to create Final Fantasy. His favorite game genre is tactical role-playing, though he was unable to lead development on one until Mistwalker's ASH: Archaic Sealed Heat (2007). His favorite non-RPG title is Ogre Battle: The March of the Black Queen, which shocked him at the time due to its narrative achievements while being graphically unimpressive compared to Final Fantasy. Speaking about his design approach in 1994, Sakaguchi said he preferred to break away from established conventions rather than working to a pre-existing plan. He also stated a wish to have games surpass the visual and narrative impact of films, citing their interactive elements as an advantage.

During his tenure with the Final Fantasy series, Sakaguchi pushed never to create sequels, which he dislikes as he thinks games should be complete experiences on their own. He also has mixed opinions on remakes, seeing the positive aspect of giving new players access to older titles, but preferring that developers focus on new projects. During his early projects, he needed to be careful about hardware limitations when thinking how many characters to include on-screen, but as consoles became more powerful he was able to create what he imagined. In 2004, he stated some of his best ideas for storyline or game design came while he was taking showers. Later he described his surfing hobby as a key influence, citing a mechanic in The Last Story as being inspired by waiting for a good wave.

Sakaguchi compared creating a new game with watching the birth of a child. For the early Final Fantasy titles, Sakaguchi placed little focus on the narrative, with his early failures in the gaming market making him feel he was not suited for scenario writing. His perspective changed during production of Final Fantasy III. A fire started at his family home and his mother Aki was killed, and by the time he reached home the fire had consumed the house. His deep emotions, combined with criticism of the series for its lack of narrative, caused him to reflect on what happened to people after death and prompted a greater focus on narrative. Sakaguchi's reflections on life and death would directly inspire elements within Final Fantasy VII, and The Spirits Within. Sakaguchi named the film's lead Aki Ross after his mother. This focus on themes of life and death continued into his work at Mistwalker.

=== Influence and legacy ===
Within Square, Sakaguchi helped support the careers of several notable staff members including SaGa creator Akitoshi Kawazu, artist Tetsuya Nomura, Xeno creator Tetsuya Takahashi and Tactics creator Yasumi Matsuno. In an interview, Nomura credited a suggestion by Sakaguchi with the complex narrative direction taken by the Kingdom Hearts series, as Nomura's original plan was for a simple narrative to fit with the demographics of development partner Walt Disney. He also proposed the concept for what would become Final Fantasy XI (2002), which was led by Mana creator Koichi Ishii.

Following his departure and the merger with Enix, the upper management of Square Enix apparently instructed its staff not to communicate with Sakaguchi (according to a Japanese game reporter), severing ties with him and ostracising staff within the company who were identified as protegees including Matsuno. Sakaguchi disliked the creative direction Final Fantasy took under its new management, particularly citing Final Fantasy XIII as indicative of this change. In later years, the position softened on both sides, though Sakaguchi did not describe it as a true reconciliation. Kitase and Nomura described the aftermath, saying that Sakaguchi provided a singular creative voice for the company which was never reclaimed after he left.

In May 2000, Sakaguchi received the Hall of Fame Award from the Academy of Interactive Arts & Sciences. At the 2015 Game Developers Choice Awards, Sakaguchi was given the Lifetime Achievement award. The event's general manager Meggan Scavio spoke positively of Sakaguchi's contribution to narratives in gaming, saying his work on Final Fantasy "helped pave the way for game stories that dealt with death, regret, and character development in a mature and significant way". At the 2017 CEDEC Awards, Sakaguchi was given the Special Award, with his extensive contributions to the gaming industry and strong following in Japan and overseas being cited as reasons.

== Works ==
=== Video games ===
Year	Title	Credit(s)
1984	The Death Trap	Director, game design, story
1985	Will: The Death Trap II	Director, game design, story
1986	Cruise Chaser Blassty	Director, game design, story
1986	King's Knight	Director, game design
1987	The 3-D Battles of WorldRunner	Director, game design
1987	Rad Racer	Director, game design
1987	Nakayama Miho no Tokimeki High School	Game design
1987	JJ: Tobidase Daisakusen Part II	Game design
1987	Final Fantasy	Director, story
1988	Final Fantasy II	Director, story
1990	Final Fantasy III	Director, story
1991	Final Fantasy IV	Director, story
1992	Final Fantasy V	Director, story
1993	Romancing SaGa 2	Executive producer
1994	Final Fantasy VI	Producer, original story
1995	Front Mission	Supervisor
1995	Chrono Trigger	Supervisor
1995	Romancing SaGa 3	Executive producer
1996	Bahamut Lagoon	Supervisor
1996	Front Mission: Gun Hazard	Supervisor
1996	Super Mario RPG	Production supervisor
1996	Treasure Hunter G	General producer
1996	Tobal No. 1	Supervisor
1997	Final Fantasy VII	Producer, original story (with Tetsuya Nomura)
1997	Bushido Blade	Executive producer
1997	Tobal 2	Supervisor
1997	Final Fantasy Tactics	Producer
1997	Front Mission 2	Supervisor
1997	Chocobo's Mysterious Dungeon	Executive producer
1997	Einhänder	Supervisor
1998	Xenogears	Executive producer
1998	Bushido Blade 2	Executive producer
1998	Parasite Eve	Producer, concept
1998	Soukaigi	Supervisor
1998	Brave Fencer Musashi	Executive producer
1998	Ehrgeiz	Supervisor
1998	Chocobo's Dungeon 2	Producer
1999	Final Fantasy VIII	Executive producer
1999	Chocobo Racing	Executive producer
1999	SaGa Frontier 2	Executive producer
1999	Cyber Org	Executive producer
1999	Legend of Mana	Executive producer
1999	Front Mission 3	Executive producer
1999	Chrono Cross	Executive producer
1999	Parasite Eve II	Executive producer
1999	Chocobo Stallion	Executive producer
2000	Vagrant Story	Executive producer
2000	Driving Emotion Type-S	Executive producer
2000	Final Fantasy IX	Producer, story
2000	The Bouncer	Executive producer
2001	Final Fantasy X	Executive producer
2002	Kingdom Hearts	Executive producer
2002	Final Fantasy XI	Executive producer
2003	Final Fantasy Tactics Advance	Executive producer
2003	Final Fantasy X-2	Executive producer
2006	Final Fantasy XII	Executive producer, special thanks
2006	Blue Dragon	Producer, Scenario, lyricist
2007	ASH: Archaic Sealed Heat	Executive producer, scenario
2007	Lost Odyssey	Scenario, lyricist
2008	Blue Dragon Plus	Scenario
2008	Away: Shuffle Dungeon	Scenario
2009	Blue Dragon: Awakened Shadow	Executive director
2011	The Last Story	Director, scenario, lyricist
2012	Party Wave	Director, music, surfing
2014	Terra Battle	Producer
2017	Terra Battle 2	Producer
2019	Terra Wars	Producer
2021	Fantasian	Producer, scenario, lyricist

=== Films ===
Year	Title	Credit(s)
2001	Final Fantasy: The Spirits Within	Director, producer, original story
