= Nakayama Miho no Tokimeki High School =

1987 video game

- Developers: Square; Nintendo R&D1
- Publisher: Nintendo
- Director: Yoshio Sakamoto
- Producer: Gunpei Yokoi
- Designers: Hironobu Sakaguchi; Yoshio Sakamoto
- Programmers: Hiroshi Nakamura; Hiroto Yamamoto
- Artist: Takashi Tokita
- Writer: Yoshio Sakamoto
- Composers: Nobuo Uematsu; Toshiaki Imai
- Platform: Family Computer Disk System
- Release: JP: December 1, 1987
- Genres: Adventure, Dating sim
- Mode: Single-player

Nakayama Miho no Tokimeki High School (Note: Japanese: 中山美穂のトキメキハイスクール, Hepburn: Nakayama Miho no Tokimeki Hai Sukūru; "Miho Nakayama's Heartbeat High School") is a 1987 adventure game developed by Square and Nintendo R&D1, and published by Nintendo exclusively in Japan for the Family Computer Disk System. The game was released on December 1, 1987, and is one of the first dating sim video games. It was designed by Hironobu Sakaguchi, who also created the Final Fantasy series, and Yoshio Sakamoto, who co-created Metroid. The music for the game was composed by Nobuo Uematsu and Toshiaki Imai. Pop idol Miho Nakayama contributed her name and likeness and voice-acted tie-in segments that could be accessed by calling toll-free phone numbers revealed during the progress of gameplay.

== Gameplay ==
The game's protagonist enters Tokimeki High School and runs into a girl wearing glasses who looks identical to Miho Nakayama. Though the game is a standard text command-style adventure game similar to the later Famicom Detective Club series, in important scenes, the player is required to select a facial expression in addition to a verbal response. The four expressions (straight face, laughter, sadness, anger) must match the content of the response being given, and any incorrect responses immediately lead to the "game over" screen. This increased the game's difficulty considerably in comparison to other text adventure games where there were fewer incorrect choices. Some scenes specifically require that the dialogue not match with the expression. For instance, choosing a dialogue expressing joy with a straight face may be the correct choice in a certain situation because it represents a deeper level of emotion and thought on the part of the protagonist. This system allowed the game to simulate a level of complexity resembling actual love relationships, leading to its classification as a dating sim. The game has two different endings, depending on the choices made during the game, and the prizes receivable via the Disk Fax network differed for each ending.

== Development ==
The intricate decision making required for success made the game's level of realism notable for its time.

Nakayama Miho no Tokimeki High School was the first bishōjo game featuring a Japanese idol. Miho Nakayama, a popular actress and singer in Japan during the 1980s, is featured on the game's cover and makes a cameo appearance in the game itself. It was created through a collaboration between Nintendo and Square Co., the later of which had just finished Final Fantasy. The game was developed by Hironobu Sakaguchi (creator of Final Fantasy), and Yoshio Sakamoto (producer of Metroid). Sakamoto, then in his fifth year at Nintendo, was excited at the prospect of making an adventure game, but came up with an idea of using a real life celebrity instead of creating a new character, to make the game feel like an "event" or a "kind of festival". The game was developed over the course of three months, with Sakaguchi and several others from Square travelling from Tokyo down to the Nintendo offices in Kyoto for a two-week crunch period at the end to finish off the project.

It was the third game compatible with the Disk Fax network of the Disk System, and uses a blue floppy disk instead of the regular yellow disk. In 1987 Square wanted to make a Disk Fax adventure game, and Nintendo suggested that the game includes an idol, as it would interest players. Though most compatible games used the Disk Fax network to upload high scores or time trials onto the official rankings system, Nakayama Miho no Tokimeki High School was the only game where players used the network to register that they had completed the game to receive prizes. The game also contained a phone number which players could call to hear hints concerning the gameplay or listen to a personal message voiced by Miho Nakayama herself. This phone service ended shortly after the release of the game, and the messages and hints are displayed in text form in subsequent versions of the game. The Disk Fax service was used for a contest from December 19, 1987, to February 29, 1988, in which 8000 winners received an autographed phonecard (for those who finished the game with the "normal" ending) and 8000 received a special VHS tape (for those who finished with the "best" ending).

== Reception ==
The game topped the bi-weekly Japanese Famitsu sales chart in December 1987.

In reader votes of Japanese Family Computer Magazine, the game received a 17.40 out of 25.

1UP.com called it the 10th "Sorta Significant Famicom Games", citing it status as a forerunner of the dating simulation game that would later become popular in Japan. GamesRadar listed the Japanese television commercial as one of the best and strangest Nintendo Entertainment System commercials.
