= King's Knight =

1986 video game

- North American NES box art
- Developer: Square (Note: Workss assisted on programming.)
- Publisher: Square
- Director: Hironobu Sakaguchi
- Composer: Nobuo Uematsu
- Platforms: Nintendo Entertainment System, MSX, NEC PC-8801mkII SR, Sharp X1
- Release: NES: JP: September 18, 1986; NA: September 1989; MSX: JP: November 1986; NEC PC-8801mkII SR and Sharp X1 (as King's Knight Special): JP: June 1987
- Genre: Scrolling shooter
- Mode: Single-player

King's Knight (Note: Japanese: キングスナイト, Hepburn: Kingusu Naito) is a scrolling shooter video game developed and published by Square for the Nintendo Entertainment System and MSX. The game was released in Japan on September 18, 1986 and in North America in 1989. It was later re-released for the Wii's Virtual Console in Japan on November 27, 2007 and in North America on March 24, 2008. This would be followed by a release on the Virtual Console in Japan on February 4, 2015, for 3DS and July 6, 2016, for Wii U.

The game became Square's first North American release under their Redmond subsidiary Squaresoft, and their first release as an independent company. The 1986 release's title screen credits Workss for programming. King's Knight saw a second release in 1987 on the NEC PC-8801mkII SR and the Sharp X1. These versions of the game were retitled King's Knight Special and released exclusively in Japan. It was the first game designed by Hironobu Sakaguchi for the Famicom. Nobuo Uematsu provided the musical score for King's Knight. It was Uematsu's third work of video game music composition.

== Plot ==
King's Knight follows a basic storyline similar to many NES-era role-playing video games: Princess Claire of Olthea has been kidnapped in the Kingdom of Izander, and the player must choose one of the four heroes (the knight/warrior "Ray Jack", the wizard "Kaliva", the monster/gigant "Barusa" and the (kid) thief "Toby") to train and set forth to attack Gargatua Castle, defeat the evil dragon Tolfida and rescue the princess.

== Gameplay ==
The player battles enemies in the first stage using Ray Jack.

King's Knight is a vertically scrolling shooter, where the main objective is to dodge or destroy all onscreen enemies and obstacles. Various items, however, add depth to the game. As any character, the player can collect various power-ups to increase a character's level (maximum of twenty levels per character): as many as seven Jump Increases, seven Speed Increases, three Weapon Increases, and three Shield Increases. There are also Life Ups, which are collected to increase the character's life meter. There are also Life Downs which should be avoided. Other onscreen icons can affect the stage, such as hidden cave entrances/exits and a "secret revealer", which reveals hidden stones that block progress. Finally, there are four types of elements to be collected in each level, which are vital to the completion of the last stage. These elements are simply elements A, B, C, and D.

Each stage has various power-ups, an element of each type, and a cave. Because caves in any given level always house at least one element type (not to mention various power-ups), it is vital that the player finds these. Caves are always hidden and are generally found in the middle of a stage. Caves also have statues that shoot fireballs, and at the end of each cave is a dragon to fight. Once the dragon is defeated, the player can exit the cave and continue with the level.

== Development and release ==
=== Differences between versions ===
The MSX version of King's Knight included a sidebar displaying the player's allocated items.

Differences were present not only in the Famicom and MSX versions of King's Knight, but in the Japanese and North American versions as well.

The Japanese (Famicom) version and the American (NES) version of King's Knight differed little, with the title screen being the only disparity. Each title screen reflected the copyright and publisher.

The MSX version of King's Knight differed from the Famicom version in a variety of ways. The opening was modified so that prior to the intro screen, players could specify what type of controller they would like to use (either a keyboard or a joystick). The in-game dynamics were very similar, although some differences exist. In the MSX version, the flanks of the screen were "closed off", while the stage maps have moved slightly, and so some of the items appear to be out of their original locations. Finally, the MSX version may seem easier, because the characters can sustain more damage from attacks.

The developers also took advantage of technological capabilities available on the MSX. As an upgrade, the MSX port featured more sound channels than the Famicom, and as such many music tracks and sound effects were altered or improved. The MSX version also boasts a wider range of colors, updated graphics, new monster and boss designs (dragons at the end of caves, for example, were replaced with reptilian monsters), and a new sidebar, which displayed the player's life meter, allocated power-ups, and allocated elements. The MSX could not smoothly render vertical scrolling though – unlike the Famicom – so the movement of the graphics is very "choppy" in comparison. Some of these changes are very similar to the changes that took place when Square's Final Fantasy was ported to the MSX2.

== Remake ==
King's Knight: Wrath of the Dark Dragon
- Developer: Flame Hearts
- Publisher: Square Enix
- Director: Michio Takahashi
- Producer: Daisuke Motohashi
- Platforms: Android, iOS
- Release: September 13, 2017
- Genres: Action role-playing, scrolling shooter
- Modes: Single-player, multiplayer

In 2017, Square Enix released a remake titled King's Knight: Wrath of the Dark Dragon for iOS and Android. It was produced by Daisuke Motohashi and developed by Flame Hearts. Developed as a mobile spin-off associated with Final Fantasy XV, the game borrows the original version's scrolling, action role-playing game style and adds a new camera perspective and an orchestral version of the former's chiptune soundtrack. The game is free-to-play with a four-player multiplayer mode.

Square Enix announced the game at the September 2016 Tokyo Game Show. Its promotional material placed the game in the Final Fantasy XV universe alongside Justice Monsters Five, another mobile companion game to the series that Square Enix announced earlier in 2016. King's Knight: Wrath of the Dark Dragon was planned for release on Android and iOS platforms in Japan in 2016, with no announcement for a North American release. The game's release was then postponed to 2017. It was released worldwide on September 13, but was shut down on June 26, 2018 - less than a year after its worldwide release.

== Other media ==
King's Knight is one of the video games to be adapted into a manga titled Susume!! Seigaku Dennou Kenkyuubu (進め！！静学電脳研究部, Shiawase no katachi), published in the Gamest Comics collection from April 1999, and drawn by Kouta Hirano.

== Reception ==
Reception

Review scores
Publication	Score
AllGame	1.5/5
Mega	29%

In a retrospective review AllGame editor Skyler Miller was critical of the game. Miller noted that "the underlying gameplay is decent" but described the graphics as "elementary" and "the structure of switching characters is awkward and frustrating". Miller noted that the game showed "none of the creativity or innovation that Square would later be known for".

King's Knight was given a 3/10 on IGN and 3/10 as well on Nintendo Life.
