= Suishō no Dragon =

1986 video game

- Developer: Square
- Publisher: Square
- Composer: Nobuo Uematsu
- Platform: Family Computer Disk System
- Release: JP: December 15, 1986
- Genre: Adventure
- Mode: Single-player

Suishō no Dragon (水晶の龍, suishō no doragon; lit. "The Quartz Dragon" or "Crystal Dragon") is an adventure video game developed and published by Square for the Family Computer Disk System in Japan in 1986.

== Gameplay ==
The game plays as a command-style adventure game. The game's interface resembles that of a point-and-click graphic adventure interface for a console. The game made use of visual icons rather than text-based ones to represent various actions, and it featured a cursor that could be moved around the screen using the D-pad to click on the icons and examine parts of the scenery.

== Plot ==
The game is set in a science fiction setting, where the main character, Hugh, and his girlfriend Cynthia are traveling in space, but are attacked by a crystal dragon: Hugh escapes with the help of a mysterious woman, but Cynthia is kidnapped. Hugh must find the dragon and save his girlfriend.

== Development ==
Many of the game's scenes involve animation, which was a specialty of Square, at the time, and Suishō no Dragon features a variety of drawings, particularly those of girls. Anime artist Gen Sato served as the character designer and illustrator on the staff, and Nippon Sunrise (currently Bandai Namco Filmworks) contributed to the animated parts of the game and also provided animated footage for the games commercial. The year the game came out, 1986, saw the release of Famicom Disk System with cartridges three times the capacity of a ROM cassette and a storage equaling 1 megabyte, which many software developers including Square waited for and then took advantage of, causing the game to come out at the end of the year.

== Reception ==
In Famicom Hisshoubon, one reviewer said the game was too difficult and that the quality of its graphics were unbalanced throughout the game. A second reviewer said that the game failed as adventure games require the story to be engaging and the games narrative had too many absurdities occur.

The fake scene, detailed below, reportedly caused a spike in sales for the game. The most iconic scene in the game is the frame where one of the heroines, Cynthia, is depicted standing with her arms spread outwards. This drawing inspired a famous fake game scene created by Family Computer Magazine (Famimaga); a prominent video game magazine published by Tokuma Shoten. The magazine explained that it was possible to start a game of yakyuken (野球拳; strip rock-paper-scissors) with Cynthia using a cheat, though this is not actually possible in the game. An altered screenshot showing the heroine losing her clothes was included alongside the article. This was not done to fool readers, but to test whether the magazine's content was being copied by other game magazines. This fake scene developed popularity on its own, and many users were made aware of this scene even if they had never played the game before.

This phenomenon is described in Kouta Hirano's gag manga, Susume!! Seigaku Dennou Kenkyūbu (進め!!聖学電脳研究部), which was serialized in the Famitsu game magazine. The game's fake sequence was also referenced in the credits of Hyperdimension Neptunia V. Suishō no Dragon was adapted into a manga titled Susume!! Seigaku Dennou Kenkyuubu (進め！！静学電脳研究部, Shiawase no katachi), published in the Gamest Comics collection from April 1999, and drawn by Kouta Hirano.
