= Square (video game company) =

Japanese video game company

Square Co., Ltd.
- Native name: 株式会社スクウェア
- Romanized name: Kabushiki Gaisha Sukuwea
- Type: Kabushiki gaisha
- Industry: Video games
- Founded: September 1986; 40 years ago (Note: On April 24, 1991, Square was merged into another company established on July 11, 1966, that became the new Square Co., Ltd.)
- Founder: Masafumi Miyamoto
- Defunct: April 1, 2003; 23 years ago
- Fate: Merged with Enix
- Successor: Square Enix
- Headquarters: Meguro, Tokyo, Japan
- Key people: Tomoyuki Takechi (chairman); Hironobu Sakaguchi (EVP, 1991–2001); Hisashi Suzuki (president and CEO, 1995–2001); Yoichi Wada (CFO, 2000–2001, president, 2001–2003)
- Products: See complete products listing
- Number of employees: 888 (September 2002)
- Subsidiaries: See subsidiaries
- Website: www.square.co.jp

Square Co., Ltd., (Note: Japanese: 株式会社スクウェア, Hepburn: Kabushiki-gaisha Sukuwea) also known under its international brand name SquareSoft, was a Japanese video game developer and publisher. It was founded in 1986 by Masafumi Miyamoto, who spun off the computer game software division of Den-Yu-Sha, a power line construction company owned by his father. Among its early employees were designers Hironobu Sakaguchi, Hiromichi Tanaka, Akitoshi Kawazu, Koichi Ishii, artist Kazuko Shibuya, programmer Nasir Gebelli, and composer Nobuo Uematsu. Initially focusing on action games, the team saw popular success with the role-playing video game Final Fantasy in 1987, which would lead to the franchise of the same name being one of its flagship franchises. Later notable staff included directors Yoshinori Kitase and Takashi Tokita, designer and writer Yasumi Matsuno, artists Tetsuya Nomura and Yusuke Naora, and composers Yoko Shimomura and Masashi Hamauzu.

Initially developing for PCs, then exclusively for Nintendo systems, Square cut ties with Nintendo in the 1990s to develop for Sony Computer Entertainment's upcoming console PlayStation. Their first major project for the console, Final Fantasy VII, was a worldwide critical and commercial success and was credited with boosting the popularity of role-playing video games and the PlayStation outside Japan. Alongside the Final Fantasy series, the company developed and published several other notable series, including SaGa, Mana, Front Mission, Chrono and Kingdom Hearts. Over the years, many staff left to found studios such as the still active Monolith Soft and Mistwalker, and the now defunct Sacnoth and AlphaDream.

In 2001, the company saw financial troubles due to the commercial failure of the feature film Final Fantasy: The Spirits Within, which ultimately led Sakaguchi to leave the company in 2003. The film's failure disrupted merger discussions with Enix, publisher of the Dragon Quest series. Following the success of Final Fantasy X and Kingdom Hearts, negotiations resumed and the merger went ahead on April 1, 2003, forming Square Enix.

== History ==
=== Origins ===
Square was initially established in September 1983 as a software subsidiary of Den-Yu-Sha, an electric power conglomerate led by Kuniichi Miyamoto. His son Masafumi Miyamoto, then a part-time employee of the Science and Technology Department at Keio University, had little interest in following his father into the electricity business. Miyamoto instead became a software developer at the Yokohama branch of Den-Yu-Sha in Hiyoshi, with a focus on the emerging video game market. Their original offices were based in a former hairdresser's salon. The company's name referred to a golfing term, and represented its aim to face challenges head-on. It also referenced a town square, emphasizing a production environment based on cooperation.

At the time, video games in Japan were usually created by a single programmer. Miyamoto, on the other hand, believed that graphic designers, programmers, and professional story writers would be needed to keep up with advances in computing and video game development. During these early years, the group was compared to a family business; one of the early hires, Shinichiro Kajitani, joined because he was a friend of Miyamoto, and later compared the company at that time to a "college club". To recruit for this new organizational structure, Miyamoto organized a salon in Yokohama and offered jobs to those who demonstrated exceptional programming skills. This led to the part-time hiring of university students Hironobu Sakaguchi and Hiromichi Tanaka, as well as Hisashi Suzuki, who would go on to become Square's CEO. Miyamoto's initial plan was to recruit from Keio University, but this never materialized.

=== 1985–1987: First games, Final Fantasy ===
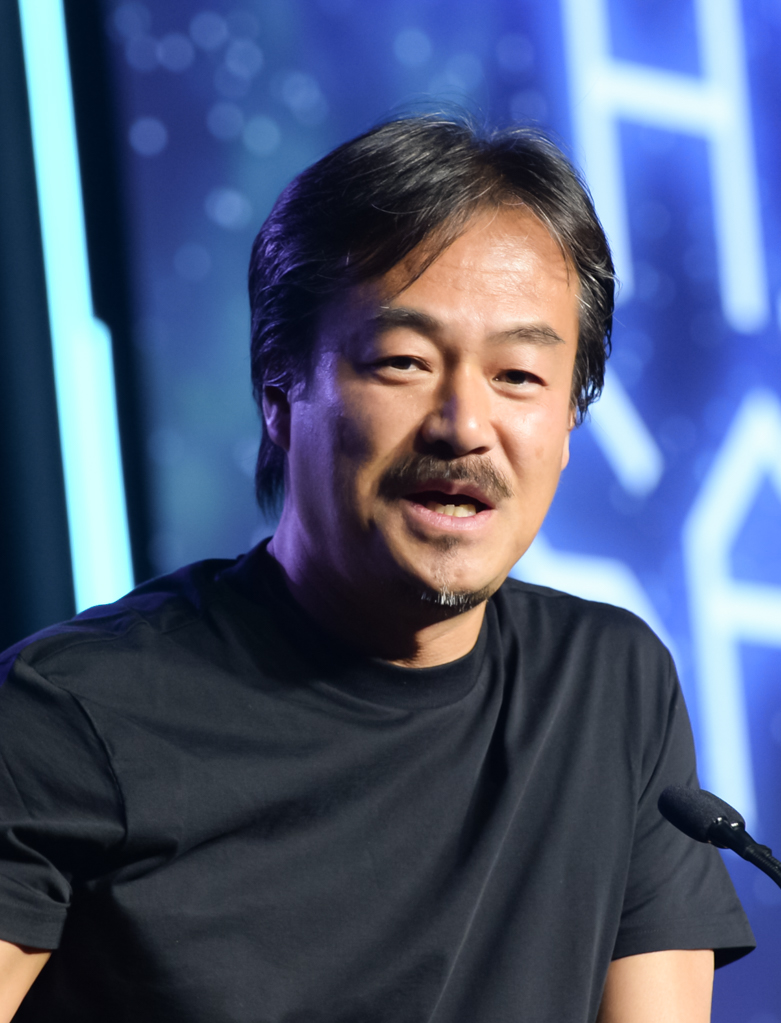
Hironobu Sakaguchi (pictured in 2015) was an early employee of Square and created its popular Final Fantasy franchise.

Square's first attempt at a game was an adaptation of the television game show Torin-ingen. As Miyamoto had not secured the license to adapt it, the show's producers forced Square to cancel the game, prompting its team to be reshuffled. Square's first completed game was The Death Trap (1984) for NEC PC-8801, a text adventure set in a war-torn African nation. The Death Trap was the first game published under the Square brand. Its sequel, Will: The Death Trap II, was released the following year to commercial success. Many of Square's early titles were produced for PC devices, and focused on the action genre.

In 1985, the company negotiated a licensing agreement with Nintendo to develop titles for the Family Computer. The company shifted to developing for the Famicom to benefit from its stable hardware, compared to the constantly changing components of PCs. Square's first Famicom release was a port of the run and gun game Thexder (1985), and its first original game was the scrolling shooter King's Knight (1986). During this period, the team also hired new developers Akitoshi Kawazu and Koichi Ishii, artist Kazuko Shibuya, Iranian-American programmer Nasir Gebelli, and composer Nobuo Uematsu. Yusuke Hirata joined that year as sales manager, and later became the company's publicity manager.

In April 1986, Square moved into new offices based in Ginza, noted as one of the most expensive areas for companies to operate; Sakaguchi later speculated Miyamoto was hoping to attract business by appearing affluent. Square was re-established as an independent developer in September of that year with capital of ¥10 million, buying the original Square gaming division from Den-Yu-Sha in December. Sakaguchi was appointed as a Director of Planning and Development, and Hisashi Suzuki became one of the company's directors. Due to the high cost of Ginza rents, the company was forced to move into smaller offices in Okachimachi, Taitō. Square began struggling financially following multiple commercial failures for Nintendo's Famicom Disk System peripheral. Miyamoto asked the company's four directors for game proposals, with plans to have their staff vote on the best idea. Sakaguchi proposed making a role-playing video game (RPG), believing it to be a viable project after the success of Enix's Dragon Quest (1986).

While skeptical, Miyamoto allowed production of the RPG on the condition it only had a five-person team. Sakaguchi led development, bringing in Gebelli, Kawazu, Ishii, and Uematsu. Production of the game, eventually called Final Fantasy, proceeded in "fits and starts". Sakaguchi eventually received help from the other team at Square led by Tanaka, which included Shibuya and newcomer debugger Hiroyuki Ito. Production on the game lasted roughly ten months. While shipments of 200,000 units were planned, Sakaguchi persuaded Square to double that number. Final Fantasy was released in 1987 to commercial success, selling over 400,000 copies in Japan. It saw greater sales success in North America when it was released in 1990, selling 700,000 copies. Two other Japanese successes from 1987 were Rad Racer and The 3-D Battles of WorldRunner.

=== 1987–1995: Expansion and notable staff ===
The success of Final Fantasy prompted development of Final Fantasy II (1988), which established many of the series recurring elements. This and four more Final Fantasy titles would appear on the Famicom and Super Nintendo Entertainment System (Super Famicom), culminating in Final Fantasy VI (1994). These were among a string of projects that Square produced exclusively for Nintendo consoles, including the portable Game Boy. In 1990, Square moved its offices to the Akasaka district, and then to Ebisu, Shibuya in 1992. In April 1991, Square merged with an identically named dormant company in order to change its share prices. As a result of the merger, Square's foundation was backdated to the other company's July 1966 founding date.

At that time, Square drew some of its development funding from loans from Shikoku Bank. Due to increasing development costs, the bank sent Tomoyuki Takechi on secondment to be their office manager in 1990. Takechi's secondment lasted until 1994, by which time Square had annual sales worth ¥16 million per year. In August of that year, Square registered with the Japan Securities Dealers Association to offer shares for public purchase. Sakaguchi was by now a prominent figure within the company, and was promoted to Executive President in 1991. His increasing corporate involvement lessened his creative input, prompting him to give greater influence to other staff. Gebelli left Square in 1993, retiring on royalties from the Final Fantasy series. Miyamoto stepped down as Square's President in 1991 while remaining a major shareholder, and was replaced by Tetsuo Mizuno. In 1991, Suzuki became Vice President.

As Final Fantasy became a featured property for the company, Square produced additional projects that became successful series of their own. The Japan-exclusive real-time strategy series Hanjuku Hero, which began in 1988, parodied conventions of the RPG genre. Kawazu helmed an RPG project for the Game Boy. Released in 1989, Makai Toushi SaGa (The Final Fantasy Legend) spawned the SaGa series, which Kawazu would continue to be involved over the years. After the release of Final Fantasy III (1990), Ishii was offered the chance to create his own game, leading to the production of Seiken Densetsu: Final Fantasy Gaiden (Final Fantasy Adventure) for the Game Boy in 1991. Ishii went on to develop additional Seiken Densetsu titles, released outside of Japan as the Mana series. A famous game from the period was Chrono Trigger, born from a collaboration between Sakaguchi, Dragon Quest creator Yuji Horii, and Dragon Ball artist Akira Toriyama. Among other standalone titles were the Western-exclusive Secret of Evermore, and the Mario-themed Super Mario RPG co-produced with Nintendo. Reflecting on this period, Sakaguchi noted that Final Fantasy was the company's most recognized property, while celebrating the fact that the company would still be profitable on the merits of their other successful game series.

Additional staff joined Square by the early 1990s, inspired by the successful Final Fantasy series, with several first working on Final Fantasy IV (1991), Yoshinori Kitase acted as a writer and later director, artist Tetsuya Nomura began as a graphic designer, and Tetsuya Takahashi and Kaori Tanaka were both artists and writers. Takashi Tokita became a full-time employee at the company, and Hiroyuki Ito began his work as a game designer. Chihiro Fujioka worked on several projects including co-directing Super Mario RPG. Kenichi Nishi worked in minor roles on Chrono Trigger and Super Mario RPG. Masato Kato, who joined in 1993, became scenario writer for Chrono Trigger. Artist Yusuke Naora first worked on Final Fantasy VI. Kazushige Nojima, known for his work on the Glory of Heracles series, joined as a scenario writer. Future director Motomu Toriyama, who had no experience with game development, began as a scenario writer.

Square also hired additional music staff. Kenji Ito contributed to both the SaGa and Mana series. Hiroki Kikuta worked on the Mana series and standalone projects. Yasunori Mitsuda started as a sound designer and was lauded for his work on the Chrono series. Yoko Shimomura, formerly a Capcom composer, did her first work on Live A Live (1994). In 1995, Square moved its headquarters to the Shimomeguro district in Meguro.

=== 1995–1999: Move to PlayStation ===
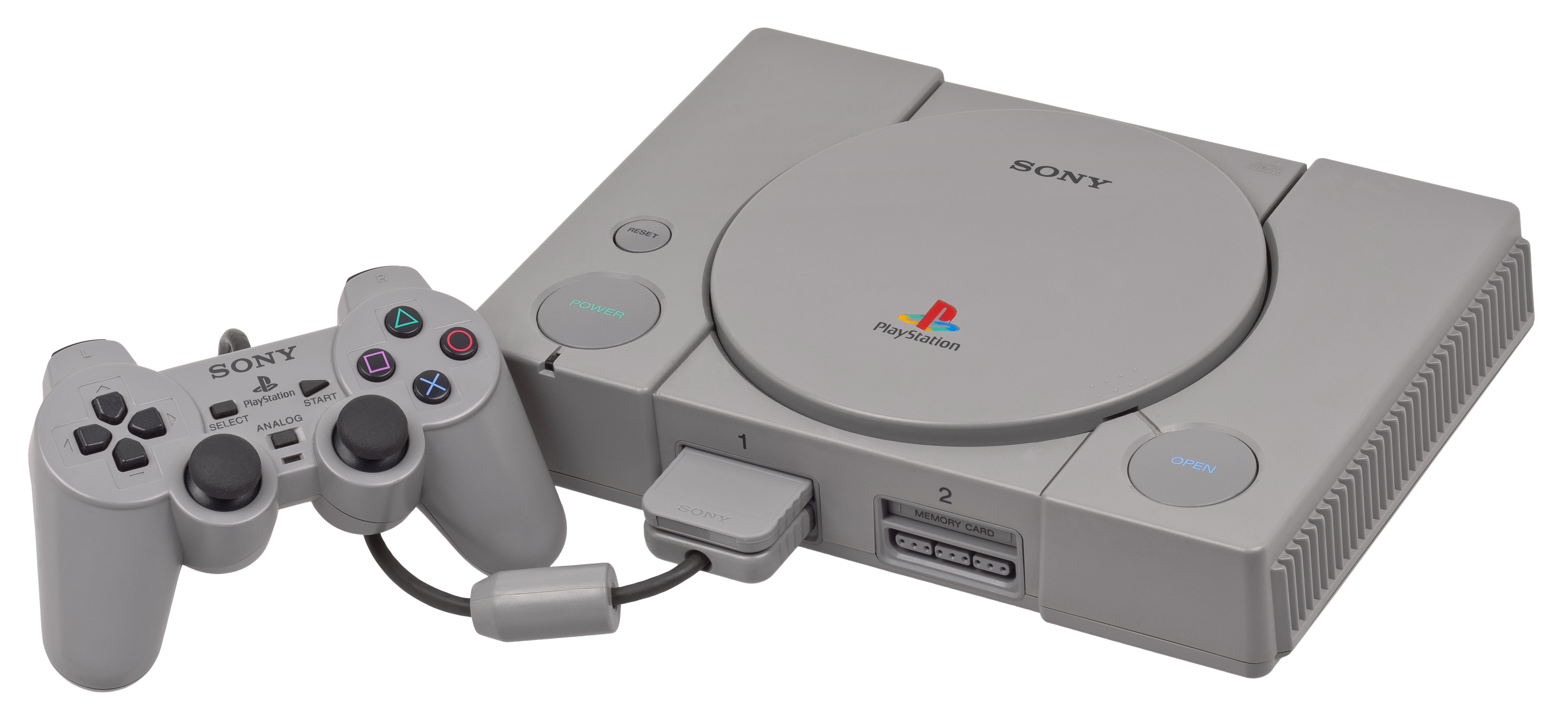
Due to Nintendo's continued use of cartridges with the Nintendo 64, Square moved game production over to the PlayStation which used CD-ROMs.

Following the release of Final Fantasy VI and Chrono Trigger, Square staff began planning the next entry in the Final Fantasy series, and entered the emerging 3D gaming market. With the production of Final Fantasy VII, Square decided to shift their projects to Sony Computer Entertainment's new PlayStation console, prompted by the affordability of CD-ROM distribution, compared to Nintendo's continued use of expensive cartridges. This shift caused a long-standing rift between Square and Nintendo; one Square employee recalled Nintendo telling the company to "never come back". In 1996, Square's final project with Nintendo was Sting Entertainment's Treasure Hunter G for the Super Famicom, while the company debuted DreamFactory's Tobal No. 1 for the PlayStation that same year. Soon after, the company signed a licensing agreement with Sony, who gained the exclusive right to publish Square's next six games in the West.

Square continued work on Final Fantasy VII, with Kitase as director, Naora as art director, Nomura as lead artist, and Nojima as scenario writer. Released worldwide in 1997, Final Fantasy VII was a worldwide commercial and critical success, bringing Square international fame. Also in 1997, at Square's invitation, Takechi returned and took Mizuno's place as President. Three new hires during the period were Shinji Hashimoto, Yasumi Matsuno, and Masashi Hamauzu. Hashimoto joined in 1995 as promotions producer for Final Fantasy VII. Matsuno, along with a number of other developers, had left Quest Corporation following the release of Tactics Ogre (1995), and worked with Sakaguchi on Final Fantasy Tactics (1997). Hamauzu joined in 1996, and worked on Final Fantasy spin-off titles and the SaGa series. Sakaguchi, working on other projects, took on the role of executive producer for the series beginning with Final Fantasy VIII, and Hashimoto stepped in as producer. Hirata went from an administrative position to lead producer, focusing on diversifying Square's library into new game genres.

Several properties were introduced during this period. These included Parasite Eve, based on a novel of the same name by Hideaki Sena; Front Mission, which began on the Super Famicom but was transferred to the PlayStation beginning with its second entry; and the Final Fantasy spin-off series Chocobo, starring an incarnation of the titular mascot character. As Square was estranged from Nintendo at the time, the company supported other platforms including the WonderSwan and Windows. Late in the PlayStation's lifecycle, Square continued to support the console with multiple releases, such as Threads of Fate (1999) and Vagrant Story (2000). The company also began work on PlayOnline, a digital storefront and a platform for online game services and web content.

During the late 1990s, Square launched an initiative to give teams of younger staff members a chance to create experimental titles on smaller budgets. Among such titles were Xenogears, Soukaigi, and Another Mind. Around this time, several staff members departed Square due to creative differences or a desire to work on their own projects. These included Takahashi and Tanaka, Fujioka, Nishi, Kikuta, Mitsuda, and Mana artist Shinichi Kameoka. In April 2000, Suzuki was appointed Square's new President, while Takechi became a company chairman. Also at this time, two outside directors were appointed, Kenichi Ohmae of Ohmae & Associates and Makoto Naruke of Microsoft. The corporate reshuffle was intended to strengthen Square's overseas connections and bring in technical and administrative support for future digital and online content. Alongside this, Yoichi Wada joined the company as a company director and eventually COO. In August 2000, Square was listed on Tokyo Stock Exchange's first section, which includes the largest companies on the exchange.

=== 2000–2003: The Spirits Within, final years ===
In addition to leading production on Final Fantasy IX (2000), Sakaguchi also worked at the 1997-established Square Pictures studio on a Final Fantasy feature film. Titled Final Fantasy: The Spirits Within, it was planned as Sakaguchi's first push towards cross-media storytelling; however, the project ran over budget and ended up costing Square and co-producer Columbia Pictures US$137 million. Upon its release in 2001, The Spirits Within was met with mixed critical reception, and grossed only $85 million. Labeled as a box-office bomb, the film damaged Square's finances, and led to the closure of Square Pictures.

Following both the failure of The Spirits Within and a delay of Final Fantasy X (2001) for the PlayStation 2, Square suffered a financial loss for the first time, prompting Sakaguchi, Takechi, and director Masatsugu Hiramatsu to resign from their positions. Sakaguchi was kept on as executive producer for Final Fantasy, while Takechi and Hiramatsu were retained as external consultants. This period left Sakaguchi in a state of low morale. In late 2001, Suzuki stepped down as President, and was replaced by Wada. Yosuke Matsuda became Senior Vice President. Kenji Ito also left during this period to work as a freelance composer. Prior to the film's release, rival company Enix was proposing merging with another game company to alleviate development costs, opening serious discussions with Square in 2000. Square's financial losses with The Spirits Within prompted Enix to halt discussions.

Under Wada, the company underwent restructuring with the intent of streamlining production and resources, and cutting development costs to increase profits. After evaluation of its financial position, and with changes to the console war due to Microsoft's Xbox, Square opened talks with Nintendo for the first time since their breakup in the 1990s. The talks were successful, with Final Fantasy Crystal Chronicles beginning development for the GameCube in late 2001. Square also began production on Final Fantasy X-2, the first direct sequel to a Final Fantasy game. Final Fantasy X-2 was Sakaguchi's last credited project at Square, and he left the company in 2003. Around this time, Square also began development on Kingdom Hearts (2002), with Nomura making his directorial debut. The game was a collaboration between Square and The Walt Disney Company, blending Disney characters with Final Fantasy elements in an original story. Kingdom Hearts was Shimomura's last project as an in-house composer before going freelance in 2002. Also released in 2002 was the Japanese version of Final Fantasy XI, the company's first MMORPG. Conceived by Sakaguchi, it was developed by the Chrono team and led by Ishii. Final Fantasy XI and its first expansion was Kato's last work for Square before leaving in 2002 to go freelance.

Following the commercial success of Final Fantasy X and Kingdom Hearts, Square and Enix resumed talks and agreed to merge their two companies. Wada described it as a merger of two companies "at their height". Despite this, the merger had its skeptics, particularly Miyamoto who did not want to see his controlling stake diluted in a merged company. Miyamoto's issue was resolved by altering the exchange ratio to one Square share for 0.85 Enix shares, and the merger was greenlit. Square Enix was formed on April 1, 2003, with Enix as the surviving corporate entity and Square dissolving its departments and subsidiaries into the new company. Around 80% of Square's staff transitioned into Square Enix. Square's final release was the Japanese version of X-2.

== Structure ==
=== Development structure ===
During reports on the merger with Enix, Takashi Oya of Deutsche Securities contrasted Enix's tradition of outsourcing development versus Square's approach to developing "everything by itself". When Square was founded in the early 1980s, there was no set development structure, with the ten-person staff freely shifting between roles and projects. This eventually evolved into two loosely defined production groups, led by Sakaguchi and Tanaka, respectively. Following the release of Final Fantasy IV, Sakaguchi divided the production team, assigning different staff members to the Final Fantasy, SaGa and Mana series. A secondary studio was founded in Osaka in 1990, with Final Fantasy Legend III (1991) as their first project.

By 1997, the company was divided into eight development divisions, with two based in Osaka. In 1998, the old development divisions were restructured into Production Departments, and the Osaka branch was closed down. The system was reshuffled again in 2002 to promote "greater understanding", and allow for reassignment between divisions. Among the heads of divisions at this time were Kitase, Kawazu, Tanaka, Matsuno and Hirata. Following the merger with Enix, the eight divisions were incorporated into the new company, with two additional divisions brought in from Enix.

=== Publishing and localization ===
Square self-published the majority of its games in Japan, and sporadically acted as a publisher for third-party developers. By contrast, their Western presence during the 80s and early 90s was small. RPGs were not popular in the North American market at that time, and Square's presence in Europe was limited. The original Final Fantasy was published in North America in 1990 by Nintendo of America close to the launch of the Super Nintendo, resulting in its two sequels being passed over for localization at that time. One of their third-party North American releases was the original Breath of Fire by Capcom, who were busy enough to outsource publishing and localization to Square. The Redmond office later closed, with some localization staff choosing not to relocate to California.

Square initially did not have an internal localization department, instead outsourcing to a number of translators. Following the release of Final Fantasy VII, which saw criticism for its localization, Square created a new internal department to encourage higher quality. Initially having only two employees, it grew steadily over the years. Individual games still ran into difficulties due to their large text sizes, difficulties translating some culture-specific elements, potential censorship, and the introduction of voice acting with games including Final Fantasy X. Notable localization staff included Kaoru Moriyama, Ted Woolsey, Michael Basket, Richard Honeywood, and Alexander O. Smith.

Many Square titles remained exclusive to Japan, for reasons including design complexities, low graphical quality, and technical difficulties. In the 1990s, Square's first six PlayStation releases were published by Sony as part of a contract between the two companies. Eidos Interactive notably handled the Windows ports of Final Fantasy VII and Final Fantasy VIII. In Europe, Square's local branch self-published a number of games including mainline Final Fantasy titles. It also partnered with third-party companies including Eidos, Crave Entertainment, and Infogrames for either publishing or distribution of different titles.

=== Subsidiaries ===
The logo of SquareSoft

In 1989, Square established Square Soft in Redmond, Washington, to provide development and publishing support in the West. After opening their North American offices, Square began publishing selected titles under the "SquareSoft" brand. As Square moved its projects to PlayStation in 1994, a second Western R&D subsidiary called Square LA was founded in August 1995 in Marina del Rey, California, renamed Square USA in October 1996. Square Soft itself would notably develop Secret of Evermore in 1995 for the Super Nintendo and later moved to Costa Mesa, California near Square USA. In 1997, a second Square USA branch was opened in Honolulu, Hawaii to focus on new interactive entertainment research, going on to help with CGI development on Parasite Eve and Final Fantasy IX. Square Europe was founded in 1998 in London, England, focusing on publishing in Europe.

A publishing brand called Aques was established by Square in 1996. The name was an anagram of Square's name, as well as an acronym for "Advanced QUality Entertainment and Sports", representing the company's diversification outside of role-playing games. That same year, Square established a distribution company called DigiCube, with convenience stores as their main strategy. The subdidiary expanded into book publishing, stocked games from other companies, and at one point published games under its own brand. DigiCube survived the Square Enix merger, though it declared bankruptcy in 2004 after years of declining sales.

In 1999, Square created a number of subsidiaries with dedicated roles: Square Visual Works to focus on producing CGI animation, Square Sounds for music and sound effects, Squartz for quality control and user support, and Square Next to support smaller game projects. Following the success of Final Fantasy VII in 1997, Sakaguchi founded a dedicated CGI film studio called Square Pictures in Hawaii; his aim was to both develop The Spirits Within and help with further development of Square's CGI technology. By the end of 2001, Square Pictures was dissolved and merged into Visual Works. Square USA's Hawaiian branch developed the CGI short "Final Flight of the Osiris" that later formed part of the 2003 anthology film The Animatrix. The branch was shut down in 2002 following a failed attempt to find a film studio partner.

In 2002, Square Next was rebranded as The Game Designer Studio, with ownership between Square's Product Development Division 2 and Kawazu. The aim was to allow for development of games for Nintendo consoles without impacting production on Sony platform games. The Game Designers Studio was absorbed back into Square Enix after the completion of Crystal Chronicles, first renamed to SQEX Corporation and eventually dissolved entirely in 2010. Square Sounds was dissolved into the main company in March 2002 as an internal division, a move attributed to cost cutting. The Square Soft subsidiary established in 1989 was rebranded as Square Enix Inc. when its parent company merged with Enix in 2003. All the other subsidiaries were folded into Square Enix during the merger, with Visual Works becoming its own dedicated department.

On May 1, 1998, Square formed a joint-venture partnership with Electronic Arts; Square Electronic Arts published Square titles in North America, while Electronic Arts Square published Electronic Arts titles in Japan. The partnership emerged the year following Electronic Arts winding down a similar partnership with Victor in December 1997. Shares were distributed between the two on a 70/30 basis relating to their role; Square Electronic Arts had Square owning 70%, while Electronic Arts owned 30%. Electronic Arts Square would also develop the PlayStation 2 launch title X-Squad. In March 31, 2003, coinciding with the Square Enix merger, both ventures were dissolved, with each partner buying the other's shares. In its February press release, Square described the joint-venture as a success.

=== Affiliates and acquisitions ===
Between 1986 and 1988, Square led a collective of game developers dedicated to the production of games for the Famicom Disk System. The Square-owned label, called Disk Original Group (DOG), included Square, HummingBirdSoft, System Sacom, Microcabin, Carry Lab, Thinking Rabbit, and Xtalsoft. This coalition was able to pool financial resources, allowing them to overcome the prohibitive costs of acting individually. The Famicom Disk System was rendered defunct by 1988 due to increased storage capacity in standard Famicom ROM cartridges. In January 1994, Square acquired developer Cobra Team, turning it into a subsidiary called Solid and focusing their work on cooperating with external developers. In 1995, Square established DreamFactory as an affiliate studio, which developed fighting-based titles for the PlayStation and PS2. DreamFactory became an independent company in 2001 after Square transferred their shares. Square later founded subsidiary Escape in March 1998 with DreamFactory staff. It only produced Driving Emotion Type-S (2000) before being liquidated in 2003.

The company held a stake in Bushido Blade developer Lightweight, founded in 1995. It sold that stake to software company Forside in 1999. Front Mission developers G-Craft were initially independent, developing the original Front Mission with Square collaborating through their Solid subsidiary and acting as publisher. Square bought out G-Craft and incorporated it in 1997 during production of Front Mission 2. Other affiliates associated with Square between the early 1990s to 2000 were font company Kusanagi, and developers Positron and Luciola. In 2002, Ogre Battle developer Quest Corporation withdrew from game development and was bought by Square. Absorbed and repurposed into a production division, their first project was Final Fantasy Tactics Advance (2003).

== Related studios ==
Many Square employees went on to found notable development studios and other ventures. Nishi founded Love-de-Lic in 1995, producing three games including Moon: Remix RPG Adventure. Love-de-Lic staff went on to found other small studios including Skip Ltd. (Chibi-Robo!), and Punchline (Rule of Rose). Frustrated with Square's rigid hierarchy, Kikuta founded Sacnoth in 1997, which would become known for the Shadow Hearts series; he left Sacnoth in 1999 following the release of his project Koudelka and founded the music label Nostrilia. Several Xenogears developers, including Takahashi and Tanaka, founded Monolith Soft in 1999 in order to pursue projects outside the Final Fantasy series, developing more games using the Xeno prefix.

Kameoka and other developers who worked on Legend of Mana (1999) founded Brownie Brown in 2000. Brownie Brown later worked with Square Enix on Sword of Mana (2003), a remake of Final Fantasy Adventure. Also in 2000, Mizuno founded AlphaDream, engaging Fujioka and going on to develop the Mario & Luigi series. Staff members from Square Pictures, including The Spirits Within co-director Motonori Sakakibara, established Sprite Animation Studios in 2002. After his resignation from Square, Takechi founded music label Dreamusic in 2001 with Kazunaga Nitta. Mitsuda founded the music studio Procyon in 2001 so he could work while maintaining his health. After stepping down as president in 2001, Sakaguchi experienced a period of low morale before returning to game development, founding Mistwalker in 2004. The studio became known for the Blue Dragon and Terra Wars series, as well as multiple stand-alone projects.

== See also ==
- List of Square video games
