= Rad Racer =

1987 video game

- North American NES box art
- Developer: Square
- Publishers: JP: Square; WW: Nintendo
- Director: Hironobu Sakaguchi
- Programmer: Nasir Gebelli
- Artist: Kazuko Shibuya
- Composer: Nobuo Uematsu
- Platforms: NES, arcade
- Release: JP: August 7, 1987; NA: October 1987; EU: January 15, 1988
- Genre: Racing
- Mode: Single-player
- Arcade system: PlayChoice-10

Rad Racer, known as Highway Star (Note: Japanese: ハイウェイスター, Hepburn: Haiwei Sutā) in Japan, is a racing video game developed and published by Square for the Nintendo Entertainment System (NES) in 1987. In this game, players drive a Ferrari 328 or a generic Formula One racing machine through a racecourse. The game was released in North America and Europe months after its debut. The title became well known for being one of two titles from Square that made use of stereoscopic 3D, which was made possible by wearing a pair of anaglyph glasses. Square president Masafumi Miyamoto initially conceived the game as an opportunity for developer Nasir Gebelli to demonstrate his 3D programming skills. Gebelli developed, and often drew by hand, the graphics for the game's 3D mode.

The game sold 1.96 million copies and is considered one of the best racing games on the NES, but was criticized as being derivative of other racing games from the period. Reviewers widely compared the game to Out Run, though opined that Rad Racer was different in some ways, and they praised the sense of speed. The game appeared in the 1989 film The Wizard and was one of three games to feature a unique competition course in the 1990 Nintendo World Championship.

== Gameplay ==
Players can engage a stereoscopic 3D mode by pressing the select button while wearing included anaglyph 3D glasses. 3D red blue glasses are recommended to view this image correctly.

Rad Racer is a racing game in which the player races in a "Transamerica" race from the West Coast to the East Coast. The gameplay is sprite-based, and the player controls the car from a "behind the vehicle" perspective. At the start of the game, the player chooses between two types of car to race, either a 328 Twin Turbo or an F1 Machine, though both cars perform exactly the same. The objective is to complete eight driving stages of varying skylines, environments, and locations, including Los Angeles, San Francisco, and Athens. Competitors' vehicles get faster as the stages progress and include Volkswagen Beetles to Ferrari Testarossas. The player's car can accelerate to 100 km/h, which turbo can then be activated to accelerate to a maximum of 255 km/h. The player can brake, steer, and change the background music while driving. Hitting any obstacles or other cars may cause the player's vehicle to flip and crash. Players have a limited amount of time to reach the next "checkpoint" in the course, which is indicated by a checkered flag; passing the flag adds additional time or may signal the end of the course. Players have a simulated dashboard that contains a progress bar, speedometer, tachometer, score, and time remaining. Unlike in Out Run where the game ends immediately, when time runs out, the player's vehicle coasts and decelerates down to 0 km/h before the game ends, giving the player an extra five to ten seconds to possibly reach the next checkpoint.

Players can activate a 3D mode during play by pressing the "Select" button and wearing 3D glasses. Players could also use the Power Glove to control their vehicle. The game was also compatible with the Famicom 3D, an accessory to the original Famicom released in Japan that utilized LCD "shutter glasses" to simulate 3D.

== Development and release ==
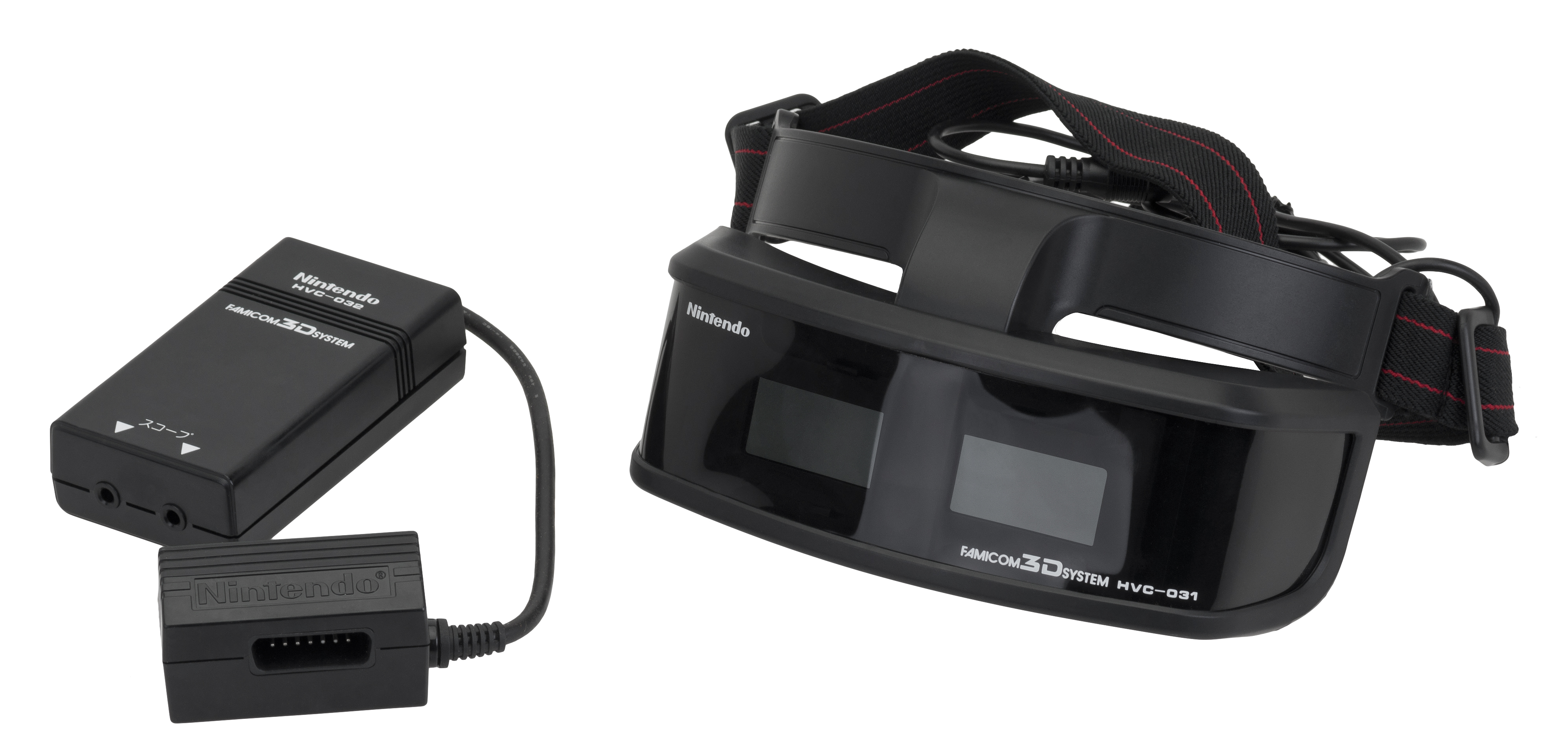
Rad Racer was developed with the Famicom 3D System in mind.

The root cause for the game's development was the then-President of Square Masafumi Miyamoto wanting to implement newly hired programmer Nasir Gebelli's skills with 3D programming previously used to develop games for the Apple II. Rad Racer was the second title by Square to use anaglyph-based 3D: Gebelli worked on both titles and was influenced by his work on the first 3D game titled The 3-D Battles of WorldRunner. Two game programmers had left Square as Gebelli was hired, resulting in Gebelli to begin programming the game by himself. Gebelli remained in Japan to figure out how to create realistic background movement of the game's scenery while the rest of Square was on vacation in Hawaii.

Game developer Takashi Tokita worked on Rad Racer with Gebelli, alongside developer Hiromichi Tanaka and artist Kazuko Shibuya who had previously worked on The 3-D Battles of WorldRunner with Gebelli. Akitoshi Kawazu also contributed to the development as his first game under Square. Hironobu Sakaguchi and Akitoshi Kawazu both worked on Rad Racer, causing developer Koichi Ishii to plan for the original Final Fantasy by himself briefly.

Though Gebelli found the work challenging, he was able to simulate the moving road in what Tokita described as a "tricky" bit of programming. To make the roads look like they were turning in 3D on a typical television, most of which at the time used cathode-ray tubes, the developers integrated scrolling by individual scanlines. Final Fantasy III used this method to create game effects for the enemy Odin. Since the game was not programmed to display single sprites but was drawn line by line, Gebelli came several times a week memorizing Shibuya's instructions on how the courses should be drawn. Shibuya would point out how many pixels and what color the lines had to be to create roads to Gebelli. Square produced six different versions of Rad Racer for different regions to accommodate the different 3D viewing systems needed if players were using either a typical television or the Famicom 3D System and a different version required for the PAL region. At the time, programmers usually worked on games individually, which Tokita described having someone to work with as an asset. Tokita designed and wrote the program for the billboards that appear in the game. Tokita also made all four levels and during the process, he learned that the middle two levels shared assets, which saved time and memory. Shibuya worked on the character sprites in which Final Fantasy developer Koichi Ishii stated that the sprites of 3-D Battles of WorldRunner and Rad Racer typify Kazuko Shibuya’s pixel art style. Akitoshi Kawazu’s designed the Rad Racer's ending that indicated with dots how far the player's progress.

Rad Racer was announced at CES in May 1987 as 3-D Racer and was released in Japan as Highway Star on August 7, 1987. In August 1987, Nintendo released an arcade machine called Playchoice-10 that contained up to ten popular NES titles. Amongst the eligible NES games, Rad Racer was also available on the arcade machine. Finally, the game was later released for the NES as Rad Racer in October 1987 in North America and on January 15, 1988 in Europe.

== Reception ==
Reception

Review scores
Publication	Score
Computer and Video Games	80%
Famitsu	32/40
Family Computer Magazine	20.89 of 30

Rad Racer was met with favorable reviews, enjoyed commercial success, and sold 1.96 million copies. It also ranked 8th on Nintendo Power's player's poll Top 30. Famitsu praised the sense of speed but felt the game was slightly monotonous. Japanese publication Family Computer Magazine applauded the variety of game landscapes found in different levels. British magazine Computer and Video Games called it an "extremely playable racing game" and said "things get very fast and competitive as you get further into the game."

Retrospective reviews gave the title a more mixed reception. Skyler Miller of GameSpot, in his article The History of Square, commented that the game bears more than a passing resemblance to Out Run," but went on to say that "it's more than just a clone" and credited the game with "effectively convey[ing] the proper sense of speed." He continued to criticize the 3D effect, stating it created some sense of depth to the gameplay but was hindered by a pronounced screen flickering. He concluded that the game does not require 3D features and that it stands on its own as a "fine racing game". Craig Harris of IGN stated in his retrospective that the game's simplicity and "race or die" focus make it one of the best racing games of its time. He also mentioned how the power glove does not improve player control, though felt the experience was still fun. Hardcore Gaming 101’s Jeremy Peeples and Neil Foster praised the game's sense of speed and arcade levels of difficulty, but criticized the lack of personality and faulty collision physics.

Rad Racer was ranked number 57 on IGN's Top 100 Nintendo Entertainment System games and was called "iconic" and one of the NES's premier racing games. Maxim included the game amongst thirteen others in their greatest 8-bit video games of all time list.

=== Legacy ===
Due to most of Rad Racer's sales being from the United States, Rad Racer II was developed and released only in North America for the NES and the arcade. The sequel featured eight new tracks and new music but similar gameplay. Hardcore Gamer 101 said that steering was looser than the first game and rival cars more aggressive, leading to a less enjoyable playing experience. Despite the efforts of Square to make unique games with 3D features such as Rad Racer and 3-D Worldrunner, and high sales, the company was in financial trouble. These events are what led to a final attempt at a breakout hit, Final Fantasy. Rad Racer appeared in a scene in the movie The Wizard. It was also one of three games, including Super Mario Bros. and Tetris, featured at the 1990 Nintendo World Championship with an exclusive racing level to complete as one of the rounds of competition. The limited-edition release of the game's cartridge used in the tournament is now one of the rarest and most valuable Nintendo games available.
