= Nasir Gebelli =

American video game designer (born 1957)

Nasir Gebelli ناصر جبلی
- Born: 1957 (age 68–69); Iran
- Occupations: Programmer, video game designer
- Years active: 1978–1993
- Known for: Gebelli Software founder; Apple II video games; Famicom 3D System games; RPGs
- Notable work: Space Eggs; Final Fantasy I–III; Rad Racer; Secret of Mana

Nasir Gebelli (Persian: ناصر جبلی, also Nasser Gebelli, born 1957) is an Iranian-American programmer and video game designer usually credited in his games as simply Nasir. He became known in the early 1980s for programming action games for Apple II, such as Gorgon and Space Eggs (a clone of Moon Cresta). These were initially published by Sirius Software, then he started his own company, Gebelli Software. Several of the games he wrote for Gebelli Software were 3D space combat simulators for the Apple II.

From the late 1980s to the early 1990s, Gebelli developed home console games for Square. He programmed the first three Final Fantasy games, the Famicom 3D System titles Rad Racer and 3-D WorldRunner, and Secret of Mana.

== Early life and career (1957–1985) ==
Gebelli was born in Iran in 1957. Because of his family relationship with the Iranian royal family of the Pahlavi dynasty, he migrated to the United States to avoid the 1979 Iranian Revolution and study computer science. He was inspired by golden-age arcade video games, such as Space Invaders. Gebelli's first project for the Apple II was EasyDraw, a logo and character creation program he used for his later games. He then began programming video games in either 1978 or 1979.

=== Sirius software ===
As a college student, he demonstrated a slideshow program he wrote at a computer store to the store's owner Jerry Jewell. In 1980, he joined a new company founded by Jewell and Terry Bradley, Sirius Software. Gebelli's first game was Both Barrels.

Within a year, Gebelli programmed twelve games. He claimed to have written the code in his head and then quickly entered it before forgetting the details. His action games were well-received, and three of his games, Phantoms Five, Cyber Strike, and Star Cruiser, appeared on Softalk's Top Thirty software list in March 1981. Six of his games later appeared on Softalk's Top Thirty list in August 1981, with the highest at number three. His best-selling titles were Space Eggs and Gorgon, which were clones of Moon Cresta and Defender, respectively. Electronic Games referred to Gebelli as "ace designer Nasir" and gave Gorgon a positive review. BYTE assured readers that Gorgon would not disappoint "Nasir Gabelli fans". Gorgon sold at least 23,000 copies in a year, making it one of the best-selling computer games through June 1982. Gebelli's games used page flipping, which eliminated the flickering that early Apple II games experienced.

=== Gebelli software ===
He left Sirius in 1982 to establish his own software company, Gebelli Software, which released its first game that same year. Entitled Horizon V, the game was a first-person shooter with a radar mechanic. Sirius released the Apple II game Zenith later in 1982, which added the ability for players to rotate their ships. In October 1982, Arcade Express reviewed Zenith and scored it 9 out of 10, stating "celebrated Nasir proves his reputation" with "this visually striking first-person space piloting and shooting" game. In March 1983, however, Andromeda (fourth place for Atari 8-bit), Russki Duck (tied for sixth for Apple) and Horizon V (tenth place for Apple) received Softline's Dog of the Year awards "for badness in computer games" based on reader submissions. Horizon V sold 5,000 copies during its first few months on sale in 1982.

IBM arranged for Gebelli to produce launch titles for the IBM PCjr, announced in late 1983. Gebelli's company was not successful, and the video game crash of 1983 caused Gebelli Software to close. Afterward, Gebelli went on an extended vacation traveling the world. When he retired from Apple II development, Gebelli had eight games on Softalk's Apple II best-seller lists, more than any other game designer.

== Square (1986–1993) ==
In 1986, Gebelli became interested in developing games again and met with Doug Carlston, his friend and owner of video game developer Broderbund. Carlston told him about the rise of the Nintendo Entertainment System and how he should start creating games for the console. Gebelli was interested, and so Doug offered to fly to Japan with Gebelli and introduce him to his contacts at Square. Gebelli had the opportunity to meet with Masafumi Miyamoto, founder and president of Square, who decided to hire him. The programmers, especially Hironobu Sakaguchi (a long-time fan of Gebelli's work), were aware of his reputation and were excited to have him join.

=== Famicom 3D System ===
While at Square, Gebelli programmed the game Tobidase Daisakusen for the Famicom Disk System, released in the United States in early 1987 as 3-D WorldRunner on the NES. 3-D WorldRunner was a pseudo-3D third-person platform game where players move in any forward-scrolling direction and leap over obstacles and chasms. It was also notable for being one of the first stereoscopic video games. His second Square project was Highway Star (Rad Racer in the U.S.), a stereoscopic 3-D racing game also designed for the Famicom 3D System in 1987. According to Sakaguchi, Square initially hired Gebelli for his 3D programming techniques, as seen in 3-D WorldRunner and Rad Racer. At the time, Gebelli did not know any Japanese and had no translator, so it was initially difficult to communicate with Sakaguchi. There were only three staff members working on both games, Gebelli, Sakaguchi, and graphic designer Kazuko Shibuya. Both games were commercially successful, selling about 500,000 copies each.

=== Final Fantasy ===
Gebelli then teamed up with Sakaguchi, Nobuo Uematsu and Yoshitaka Amano as part of Square's A-Team to produce Final Fantasy, the first entry in the popular Final Fantasy series. A role-playing video game released for the NES in 1987 in Japan, it featured several unique features, a character creation system, the concept of time travel, side-view battles and transportation by canoe, boat and airship. It also had the first RPG minigame, a sliding puzzle added by Gebelli into the game despite its not being part of Square's original game design.

He went on to program Final Fantasy II, released in 1988, introducing an "emotional storyline, morally ambiguous characters, tragic events". He also made the story "emotionally experienced rather than concluded from gameplay and conversations". The game replaced traditional levels and experience points with a new activity-based progression system that required "gradual development of individual statistics through continuous actions of the same kind". Final Fantasy II also featured open-ended exploration and an innovative dialogue system where players use keywords or phrases during conversations with non-player characters.

Gebelli went on to program Final Fantasy III in 1990, which introduced the job system, a character progression engine allowing the changing and combination of character classes. Midway through the development of both Final Fantasy II and III, Gebelli returned to Sacramento, California from Japan due to an expired work visa. The rest of the development staff followed him to Sacramento with materials and equipment needed to finish game production.

=== Secret of Mana ===
After completing Final Fantasy III, Gebelli took another long vacation and later returned to work on Seiken Densetsu II (released as Secret of Mana in the U.S.), the second entry in the Mana series, released in 1993. The game made advances to the action role-playing game genre, including its unique cooperative multiplayer gameplay. The team who created the game had worked on the first three Final Fantasy titles: Gebelli, Koichi Ishii, and Hiromichi Tanaka. The team developed Secret of Mana to be a launch title for Super NES's CD-ROM add-on. After Sony and Nintendo backed out of making the console, the game was changed to fit in a standard Super NES game pak.

The game received considerable acclaim for its innovative pausable real-time battle system, stamina bar, the "Ring Command" menu system, its innovative cooperative multiplayer gameplay, and the customizable AI settings for computer-controlled allies.

== Later life (1994–present) ==
Following Secret of Mana's completion, Gebelli retired with income from Square royalties and travelled the world. In August 1998, he attended an Apple II Reunion in Dallas, Texas, at video game developer Ion Storm offices. There, he met developer and fan John Romero, who interviewed him. Gebelli lives in Sacramento, California, where he has lived most of his life.

== Legacy ==
John Romero (Wolfenstein 3D, Doom, Quake) credited Gebelli as a significant influence on his career as a game designer. He also cited Gebelli as his favorite programmer and a notable inspiration, mentioning his fast action and 3D programming work on games such as Horizon V and Zenith. Gebelli also inspired the careers of other developers, such as Mark Turmell (NBA Jam, Smash TV). Jordan Mechner has also credited Gebelli's work on the Apple II as inspiration and as a major influence on the creation of Karateka and Prince of Persia. Richard Garriott (Ultima) also praised Gebelli's ability to craft games that "were really playable and fun!"

Final Fantasy went on to become a major franchise, and Hironobu Sakaguchi went on to become a well-known figure in the game industry. Final Fantasy's side-view battles became the norm for numerous console RPGs. Developers used Final Fantasy II's activity-based progression system in several later RPG series, such as the SaGa, Grandia, and The Elder Scrolls. Final Fantasy III's job system became a recurring element in the Final Fantasy series. Secret of Mana has also influenced later action RPGs, including modern titles such as The Temple of Elemental Evil and Dungeon Siege III.

Rad Racer and Final Fantasy both contain anti-piracy checks that look for "NASIR" and "PROGRAMMED BY NASIR" respectively in memory.

== List of games ==
=== Sirius software ===
- Both Barrels (1980, Apple II)
- Star Cruiser (1980, Apple II)
- Phantoms Five (1980, Apple II)
- Cyber Strike (1980, Apple II)
- Gorgon (1981, Apple II)
- Space Eggs (1981, Apple II)
- Pulsar II (1981, Apple II)
- Autobahn (1981, Apple II)

=== Gebelli software ===
- Firebird (1981, Apple II)
- Horizon V (1982, Apple II)
- Zenith (1982, Apple II)
- Neptune (1982, Apple II)
- ScubaVenture (1983, IBM PCjr)
- Mouser (1983, IBM PCjr)

=== Square ===
- 3-D WorldRunner (1987, FDS/NES)
- Rad Racer (1987, NES)
- JJ: Tobidase Daisakusen Part 2 (1987, NES)
- Final Fantasy (1987, NES)
- Final Fantasy II (1988, NES)
- Final Fantasy III (1990, NES)
- Secret of Mana (1993, SNES)
