= The 3-D Battles of WorldRunner =

1987 video game

- North American cover art
- Developer: Square
- Publishers: JP: Disc Original Group (Square); NA: Acclaim Entertainment
- Director: Hironobu Sakaguchi
- Programmer: Nasir Gebelli
- Artist: Kazuko Shibuya
- Composer: Nobuo Uematsu
- Platforms: Family Computer Disk System, Nintendo Entertainment System
- Release: Famicom Disk System: JP: March 12, 1987; NES: NA: September 1987
- Genres: Rail shooter, platform
- Mode: Single-player

The 3-D Battles of WorldRunner (shortened to 3-D WorldRunner on the North American box art), originally released in Japan as Tobidase Daisakusen (Note: Japanese: とびだせ大作戦; lit. 'Operation: Jump Out'), is a 1987 third-person rail shooter platform video game developed and published by Square for the Family Computer Disk System. It was later ported to cartridge format and published by Acclaim for the Nintendo Entertainment System.

For its time, the game was technically advanced; the game's three-dimensional scrolling effect is very similar to the linescroll effects used by Pole Position and many racing games of the day as well as the forward-scrolling effect of Sega's 1985 third-person rail shooter Space Harrier. 3-D WorldRunner was an early forward-scrolling pseudo-3D third-person platform-action game where players were free to move in any forward-scrolling direction and had to leap over obstacles and chasms. It was also one of the first stereoscopic 3-D games. WorldRunner was designed by Hironobu Sakaguchi and Nasir Gebelli, with music composed by Nobuo Uematsu. All were later core members of the team behind the Final Fantasy role-playing video game series.

== Gameplay ==
WorldRunner battles Menacing Meanies in the first world.

WorldRunner features many sprite-based elements that are typical of a forward-scrolling rail shooter game, where the player focuses on destroying or dodging onscreen enemies against a scrolling background. 3-D WorldRunner incorporates a distinct third-person view, where the camera angle is positioned behind the main character.

As Jack, players make their way through eight worlds, battling hostile alien creatures such as blob monsters and leaping over bottomless canyons. Each world is divided into different quadrants, and the player must pass through each quadrant before the time counter on the bottom of the game screen reaches zero. In each quadrant, the player can find pillar-like columns that house power-ups, objects that are beneficial or add extra abilities to the game character such as temporary invincibility or laser missiles. At the end of each world's last quadrant is a serpentine creature which must be defeated to advance. A status bar at the bottom of the screen displays the player's score, the time counter, the world number, the world quadrant, the number of bonus stars (items that increase the player's score count) collected by the player, and the number of lives remaining.

Because the game is set against a constantly scrolling screen, Jack's movement cannot be stopped, but the player can speed up or slow down Jack's pace. The player is also allowed a degree of limited horizontal movement. When fighting Serpentbeasts at the end of each world, the player is capable of moving Jack freely in all directions. Jack's basic actions consist of jumping, used to dodge canyons and enemies, and firing collectible missiles of various types to destroy enemies.

In this screenshot, the "3D mode" has been activated. 3D red cyan glasses are recommended to view this image correctly.

Part of the appeal and selling point of WorldRunner was its "3D mode". It was the first of three games by Square to feature such an option. To enter or exit 3D mode, players would press the select button. When the 3D mode is enabled, the game uses computer image processing techniques to combine images from two slightly different viewpoints into a single image in a process known as anaglyph 3D. While North American copies of the game included a pair of 3D glasses for players to view the effect, such glasses were sold separately from Japanese copies.

== Plot ==
Players assume the role of Jack the WorldRunner, a wild "space cowboy" on a mission to save various planets overrun by serpentine beasts. The game takes place in Solar System #517, which is being overrun by a race of aliens known as Serpentbeasts, who are led by the evil Grax. As WorldRunner, the player must battle through eight planets to find and destroy Grax with fireballs.

== Development ==
In a 1999 interview with NextGeneration magazine, Sakaguchi admitted that he "liked Space Harrier", but said that his main reason for the development of the game was that Square owner Masafumi Miyamoto wanted to demonstrate Nasir Gebelli's 3D programming techniques for which he had been hired.

== Reception ==
Commercially, the game was met with modest success, selling roughly 500,000 copies worldwide. In North America, the game sold over 200,000 units. The sales of this game title and other titles from Square at this time were not enough for Square to stay in business, and the company's fortunes only turned around with the release of the first Final Fantasy.

At the time of release, Cash Box magazine praised the game's visual effects and the variety of enemies and obstacles.

In retrospective reviews, the game had a mixed reception. Game Informer praises the surrealistic landscape and behind the character running capability, but noted that they were not capable of seeing the 3D effect even with the 3D glasses on. Retro Gamer criticized for being a seeming ripoff of Sega's Space Harrier, noting that even the bosses of both games look similar. They did applaud the soundtrack and the bright visuals, comparing the color palette to Fantasy Zone. Vito Gesualdi of Destructoid named it among the "five most notorious videogame ripoffs of all time" in 2013.

== Legacy ==
JJ: Tobidase Daisakusen Part II (ジェイ ジェイ, Jei Jei) is a Japan-only follow-up to the game released on December 7, 1987, developed by the same team who did the original, but as a regular cart instead of for the Disk System. JJ was one of the few games to utilize the Famicom 3D System, and was Square's last work before the inception of the popular Final Fantasy franchise.

JJ moves at a much faster pace with increased difficulty, plus a more "sinister" art style and use of color. The soundtrack was again composed by Nobuo Uematsu, and each track was made to match the respective track from the first game.

== See also ==
- Rad Racer
- Space Harrier 3-D
