= Unne =

Unne or UNNE can refer to:

- Dr. Unne, a minor character in Final Fantasy
- Unei, also known as Unne, a character in Final Fantasy III
- National University of the Northeast, an Argentine university
