= Opera House (disambiguation) =

An opera house is a theatre building used primarily for opera performances.

As a specific venue, Opera House may refer to:

- Central City Opera House in Colorado, United States
- Manchester Opera House, in Manchester, England
- John F. Kennedy Center for the Performing Arts's Opera House
- Opera House, Royal Tunbridge Wells, a former opera house in England
- Opera House, Wellington, in New Zealand
- Opera House at Boothbay Harbor, in Maine, United States
- Royal Opera House (Mumbai), in India
- Sydney Opera House, New South Wales, Australia
- The Opera House (nightclub), a former name of O2 Academy Bournemouth in Dorset, England
- The Opera House (Toronto), in Canada
- Baker's Opera House, in New Jersey, United States

Opera House may also refer to:

- Opera House (film), a 1961 Indian film by P. L. Santoshi
- The Opera House (film), a 2017 documentary by Susan Froemke
- Operahouse, a five-piece rock band based in the UK
- Opera House (horse), a British Thoroughbred racehorse
- Opera House (Final Fantasy VI), a level in the video game Final Fantasy VI
- Opera House Theatre, Blackpool, in Blackpool, England
- "The Opera House" (song), a 1987 song by Arthur Baker, under the alias Jack E Makossa
- "Opera House", a song by Cigarettes After Sex from their self-titled album
- Small-town opera house, a type of theater built in the rural United States in the late 19th century
