= Final Fantasy II =

1988 video game

- Cover art featuring main protagonist Firion
- Developer: Square
- Publisher: Square
- Director: Hironobu Sakaguchi
- Producer: Masafumi Miyamoto
- Designers: Hiromichi Tanaka; Akitoshi Kawazu; Koichi Ishii
- Programmer: Nasir Gebelli
- Artist: Yoshitaka Amano
- Writer: Kenji Terada
- Composer: Nobuo Uematsu
- Series: Final Fantasy
- Platform: Family Computer: WonderSwan Color; PlayStation; i-mode; EZweb; PlayStation Portable; iOS; Android; Windows; Nintendo Switch; PlayStation 4; Xbox Series X/S
- Release: December 17, 1988: Famicom; JP: December 17, 1988; WonderSwan Color; JP: May 3, 2001; PlayStation; JP: October 31, 2002; i-mode; JP: February 4, 2005; EZweb; JP: December 15, 2005; Yahoo!; JP: December 1, 2006; PlayStation Portable; JP: June 7, 2007; NA: July 24, 2007; EU: February 8, 2008; iOS; WW: February 25, 2010; Android; WW: December 21, 2012; Pixel Remaster; Android, iOS, Windows; WW: July 28, 2021; Nintendo Switch, PlayStation 4; WW: April 19, 2023 Xbox Series X/S; WW: September 26, 2024
- Genre: Role-playing
- Mode: Single-player

Final Fantasy II (Note: Japanese: ファイナルファンタジーII, Hepburn: Fainaru Fantajī Tsū) is a 1988 role-playing video game developed and published by Square for the Family Computer as the second installment of the Final Fantasy series. It was ported to and remade for WonderSwan Color, PlayStation, Game Boy Advance, PlayStation Portable, and mobile phones. Originally exclusive to Japan, later versions were released internationally, including the 2021 Final Fantasy Pixel Remaster version. The story follows the warrior Firion and his allies as they join a rebellion against the expanding Palamecian Empire. The gameplay is similar to the original game with an overworld and dungeon exploration, but its combat design is changed to a usage-based growth system where characters' statistics increase according to how they are used or acquired.

The game began development after the success of Final Fantasy, with the team using a new setting to make the game accessible to players. Returning staff included series creator Hironobu Sakaguchi as director, designer Akitoshi Kawazu, programmer Nasir Gebelli, artist Yoshitaka Amano, writer Kenji Terada, and composer Nobuo Uematsu. The team wanted to create a game that was different from the first Final Fantasy, including creating a narrative that drew inspiration from The Empire Strikes Back (1980), and redesigning the combat system. The stat growth system was created by Kawazu, and he later felt the team went too far in making the game different from the original.

Upon its release, Final Fantasy II received highly positive reviews in Japan; retrospective reviews have noted the game as having a stronger story than Final Fantasy, but have described it as among the most divisive entries in the series due to its progression system. As of 2003, the game sold over one million copies worldwide. Final Fantasy II saw the introduction of multiple series staples including chocobos and the recurring character Cid. Due to negative feedback, the next title Final Fantasy III (1990) reverted to the original combat system. Kawazu would continue using his system in the SaGa series, beginning with 1989's Makai Toushi Sa・Ga (The Final Fantasy Legend) for the Game Boy.

== Gameplay ==
The ill-fated opening battle in the Famicom version

Final Fantasy II features gameplay similar to that of its predecessor, Final Fantasy. The player can freely roam an overworld containing several towns and dungeons. A menu-based system allows the player to outfit each character with equipment and up to two—often disposable—items for battle. Magic spells are assigned to the character from the item menu, and certain spells, such as "Cure" can be used outside of battle. The player can also save their progress on the overworld. Weapons, armor, items, and magic spells can be purchased at shops, and townspeople provide useful information for the player's progression through the game. One new feature is the "Word Memory" system: when in conversation with non-player characters (NPCs), the player can "ask" about and "memorize" special keywords or phrases, which can later be repeated to other NPCs to gain more information or unlock new actions. Similarly, there exist a handful of special items that can be shown to NPCs during conversation or used on certain objects, which have the same effect. Characters and monsters are no longer separated into separate windows in the battle screen as they were in the first Final Fantasy, and players can see their current and total hit points below the battle. Players can also fight with less than four characters in their party, which was not possible in the first game. Final Fantasy II introduced the chocobo, the signature Final Fantasy mascot, which lets characters ride to a location at great speed without being attacked by enemies. The recurring character Cid was also introduced, and a character of the same name has appeared in every main-series game since.

On the overworld and within dungeons, random encounters with enemies can be fought to improve each character's attributes. Unlike the original Final Fantasy, players cannot upgrade their characters' classes. The game is also one of the few games in the series to not use experience-based levels. Instead, each character participating in battle develops depending on what actions they take. For instance, characters who frequently use a particular type of weapon will become more adept at wielding a weapon of that type, and will also increase in physical strength and accuracy. Attributes include hit points, magic points, magic power, stamina, strength, spirit, agility, intelligence, and evasion. Hit points (HP) and magic points (MP) increase with their use; a character who takes a heavy amount of damage in a battle might earn an increase in maximum HP, while a character who uses a lot of MP during battle might increase their maximum MP. This experience system had several unintended consequences that allowed characters to gain much more experience than intended, such as players having their characters attack each other and repeatedly cast spells, thus causing their HP and abilities to grow extensively. Final Fantasy II uses the same turn-based battle system seen in the original Final Fantasy, with battle parties consisting of up to four characters at a time. The game introduces a "back row" in battle, within which characters or enemies are immune to most physical attacks, but can be harmed with bows and magical attacks.

== Plot ==
=== Setting and characters ===
Yoshitaka Amano's artwork of the main characters Leon, Firion, Maria, and Guy

Final Fantasy II is set in a fantasy world divided between multiple nations, including the Palamecian Empire and the kingdom of Fynn. During the game's events, the Palamecian Empire has begun a ruthless expansion, conquering or destroying its neighbours including the kingdom of Kashuan and the dragoon homeland of Deist. A rebellion is formed to fight against the Empire's expansion, headquartered at Fynn Castle. The game's inciting incident is an attack by the Empire that destroys Fynn Castle and the surrounding town.

Final Fantasy II features four playable characters as well as several secondary characters who are only briefly controlled by the player. The four main characters are Firion ("Frioniel" in the Japanese release), a young man skilled in fighting; his childhood friend Maria; Guy, a man formally raised by wolves before becoming friends with Firion and Maria; and Leon, Maria's brother and temporary ally of the Empire. Other notable characters are Hilda, leader of the rebel army; Minwu, a mage serving Hilda's family; Gordon, heir to the throne of Kashuan; Josef, a villager in the town of Salamand; Leila, a pirate who joins the rebellion later; and Ricard Highwind, last of the dragoons. The main antagonist is the Emperor of Palamecia, a powerful mage who seeks to conquer the world and summons monsters from Hell to achieve this.

=== Story ===
Firion, Maria, Guy, and Leon are attacked by Palamecian Black Knight soldiers and left for dead. Firion, Maria, and Guy are rescued by Princess Hilda, who has established a rebel base in the town of Altair after her kingdom of Fynn was invaded by the Emperor. Hilda denies their request to join the rebel army because they are too young and inexperienced. The three set off for Fynn in search of Leon; there, they find a dying Prince Scott of Kashuan, Hilda's fiancé, who informs them that a former nobleman of Kashuan, Borghen, betrayed the rebellion and became a general in the Imperial army. The party returns to Altair to notify Hilda. She allows the group to join the rebellion and asks them to journey north to find mythril, a metal that could be used to create powerful weapons. The party makes its way north to the occupied village of Salamand, where they save the villagers forced to work in the nearby mines, kill Borghen, and retrieve the Mythril.

For their next mission, the party is sent to the city of Bafsk to prevent the construction of a large airship known as the Dreadnought; however, it takes off just as they arrive. After retrieving the Sunfire, a weapon that can blow up the Dreadnought, they watch helplessly as an airship with Hilda on board is captured by the Dreadnought. When the Dreadnought lands to stock up on supplies, the party rescues Hilda and throws the Sunfire into the airship's engine. Before escaping the explosion, the party encounters a dark knight Maria recognizes as Leon.

On his deathbed, the king of Fynn tasks the party to seek the help of the seemingly extinct dragoons of Deist. There, the party finds only a mother with her son, learning that all but one of the dragoons are dead, partly as a result of imperial poison. After placing an egg of the last wyvern in a cavern, the party returns to Altair and finds the Hilda they rescued is a lamia in disguise. The party slays the imposter and rescues the real Hilda before successfully reclaiming Fynn from the imperial forces. They then travel west, searching for a powerful magic item, joining forces with Ricard, the last surviving dragoon. The party returns to Fynn and sees that many towns have been destroyed by a cyclone summoned by the Emperor. The party calls upon the newly born last wyvern to take them to a castle inside the cyclone, where they confront and kill the Emperor. Everyone celebrates the Empire's defeat until a mortally wounded Fynn soldier arrives and reveals that Leon has taken the throne and plans to destroy the rebels with the Imperial army.

The party enters the castle of Palamecia and confronts Leon. The Emperor reappears in the throne room in a new demonic form, revealing he has become the ruler of Hell and returned to destroy the entire world. Ricard sacrifices himself to allow the party to escape with Leon and the wyvern. Palamecia Castle transforms into Pandaemonium, the capital of Hell. Leon agrees to help the group battle the Emperor. The party travels to the Jade Passage, an underground passage to the underworld, and finds the portal to Pandaemonium, where they finally defeat the Emperor. Afterward, Leon chooses to leave in response to the trouble he caused, though Firion assures him that he will be welcomed back if and when he returns.

In the epilogue featured in Final Fantasy I & II: Dawn of Souls, an extra story follows the spirits of Minwu, Josef, Scott and Ricard as they arrive in Arubboth, the palace of Heaven and twin to Pandaemonium where the group encounter the spirits of those the Empire killed. They eventually reach the top of Arubboth and find the Emperor's "light side" which split from his dark counterpart in Pandaemonium when Firion killed him. He offers them eternal life in return for their forgiveness, but visions of their loved ones convince them that the Light Emperor is just as evil as the Emperor of Hell. The party defeat the Light Emperor, and their spirits visit the living world one last time to watch the celebrations before fading away.

== Development ==
Production of Final Fantasy II began after the success of the original Final Fantasy, with its developer and publisher Square having increased the number of copies manufactured to fund a sequel. According to Akitoshi Kawazu, after the first game's release there was a wish to do something different. The game's staff expanded a little compared to the first game, but it was still a relatively small team of around ten people. Series creator Hironobu Sakaguchi was director, and Kawazu co-designed with Hiromichi Tanaka and Koichi Ishii, The producer was Masafumi Miyamoto, founder and former president of Square. Programmer Nasir Gebelli returned from the first game. Due to his work visa expiring, Gebelli needed to return to Sacramento, California, so the team followed with the appropriate equipment so production could be finished with him.

Yoshitaka Amano returned to create character, monster and promotional art; as with the previous game, Amano created the monster design concepts using black and white ink drawings. Kazuko Shibuya was in charge of designing all the sprite art, although multiple artists helped create the game's monster designs. A notable addition was the Chocobo, designed by Ishii based on a chicken he had kept as a childhood pet. When he presented the Chocobo concept as a constant companion for the party, Sakaguchi rejected it and instead incorporated it as a mount. Another creature designed by Ishii for the game, the Moogle, was ultimately left out due to there being no place in the story for them. Their sprite work was redesigned into a different enemy. During production, there were arguments between staff members as the constant addition of monsters to the game prevented a master build being completed.

Kenji Terada returned as scenario writer, and he recalled there being resistance within Square to making the game a numbered sequel due to not continuing the original's world and story. The team decided to carry over some elements from the first, such as crystals, while creating a new story so players could buy the game without issue. Sakaguchi recalled creating the initial premise after watching The Empire Strikes Back (1980), carrying over the concept of a rebel faction facing an evil empire. Terada wrote his script inspired by the request of a young staff member for a story that would bring tears to his eyes, so wrote it to focus on tangled human relationships. One character created who would be a recurring figure was the engineer Cid, who was created to be an intelligent and wise figure "like Yoda from the Star Wars series".

Using the experience gained from the first installment, which focused more on fitting story ideas into their new gameplay system and game world, the developers fully crafted the story of Final Fantasy II first. The gameplay was then built around the narrative. Sakaguchi remembered that the combat system was Kawazu's original idea. The usage-based growth mechanic was originally created to tie into the story-driven style being used, with players naturally evolving into certain classes rather than having it chosen at the outset. He also expressed his frustration with the abstract nature of experience point systems, wanting something unpredictable for players. The goal for a game that was different from the original, with Kawazu later feeling they had become so invested in that goal that they strayed too far and corrected back to a traditional model for later titles. He also remembered being the only one who understood it among the staff.

=== Music ===
The music for Final Fantasy II was originally composed by Nobuo Uematsu, who worked on the original game. As with the first Final Fantasy, Uematsu had a limited number of sound channels to work with on the Famicom, and also had to work round space limitations with the amount of songs he could include. He remembered the restriction to three-note cords on the Famicom sparked his creativity when composing the score. A notable theme created for the game was for when the characters rode a Chocobo, which would be carried forward with different musical styles in later entries.

The music was later arranged by Tsuyoshi Sekito for the WonderSwan Color, PlayStation, and Game Boy Advance remakes. Although the two soundtracks were composed separately, the soundtrack to II has only been released as a combined album with the soundtrack to Final Fantasy I. They were first released as All Sounds of Final Fantasy I•II in 1989, which was then republished in 1994. An arranged album of music from the two soundtracks titled Symphonic Suite Final Fantasy was also released in 1989, while Final Fantasy & Final Fantasy II Original Soundtrack, a combined soundtrack album for the PlayStation versions of the games, was released in 2002 and re-released in 2004. The music of Final Fantasy II has also appeared in various official concerts and live albums, such as 20020220 music from Final Fantasy, a live recording of an orchestra performing music from the series including several pieces from the games. Additionally, several songs from the game were performed as part of a medley by the Royal Stockholm Philharmonic Orchestra for the Distant Worlds – Music from Final Fantasy concert tour, while a different medley of songs from the game were performed by the New Japan Philharmonic Orchestra in the Tour de Japon: Music from Final Fantasy concert series.

== Release ==
Final Fantasy II was released on December 17, 1988, noted as being close to the same date as the original game the previous year. The original version was ported in Japan onto a number of systems including onto Nintendo's Virtual Console platform for Wii (June 16, 2009) and the Wii U (December 11, 2013).

Following the successful North American release of the original Final Fantasy by Nintendo in 1990, Square's North American subsidiary began work on an English localization, to be called Final Fantasy II: Dark Shadow Over Palakia. Assigned to the project was Kaoru Moriyama, whose later work included script translations for Final Fantasy IV and Secret of Mana (known as Seiken Densetsu 2 in Japan). Although a beta version was produced, and the game was advertised in several Square Soft trade publications, the long development time, the age of the original Japanese game and the arrival of the Super Nintendo Entertainment System, the NES's successor console, led Square Soft to cancel work on the Final Fantasy II localization in favor of the recently released Final Fantasy IV (which, to avoid confusing North American players, was retitled Final Fantasy II).

Although a prototype cartridge of the English NES Final Fantasy II was produced, the project was, by Moriyama's own admission, still far from complete: "We had so very limited memory capacity we could use for each game, and it was never really "translating" but chopping up the information and cramming them back in... [Additionally] our boss had no understanding in putting in extra work for the English version at that time". A fan translation of the original game was created using an original translation as the existence of the prototype cartridge was not common knowledge at the time. The first international release of its original version came as part of the Final Fantasy Pixel Remaster series, initially releasing on Windows and mobile platforms on July 28, 2021.

=== Remakes ===
Final Fantasy II was ported to the WonderSwan Color as part of a deal with Bandai to bring the first three Final Fantasy titles to the console; Square was one of the major supporters for the WonderSwan platform during its tenure. The port was released on May 3, 2001. Its visuals were updated for the platform, and it was included as a bundle with a special themed edition of the console. A PlayStation version released as a standalone by Square in Japan on October 31, 2002. It was bundled together with the original game and released as Final Fantasy Origins on March 14, 2003 in Europe by Infogrames, and on April 8 in North America by the newly-formed Square Enix. The PlayStation version was the first time the game releases in English and came with reworked graphics, a new CGI opening cutscene, a monster database, and art gallery. The port was re-released as part of the Final Fantasy 25th Anniversary Ultimate Box package in December 2012. Both the WonderSwan Color and PlayStation ports were handled by Kan Navi.

An expanded remake of the game was released for the Game Boy Advance (GBA) bundled with the original game under the title Final Fantasy I & II: Dawn of Souls in 2004. It was published by Square Enix in Japan on July 29, then by Nintendo on November 29 in North America and December 10 in Europe. The port was produced by Takashi Tokita, and developed by Square Enix's Development Division 7 and Tose. The remake included redrawn sprite artwork and adjustments to bring in-game terminology in line with the rest of the series. The gameplay was left unchanged, as Tokita considered it a hallmark of Kawazu's design. The new storyline was intended by Tokita to shine a spotlight on characters that had relatively little presence in the main narrative such as Minwu, who was made the new scenario's lead character. The character art was redrawn by Gen Kobayashi. The redrawn characters were made cuter compared to their original versions to be more appealing to children.

In 2005 and 2006, Square Enix released a version of Final Fantasy II for three Japanese mobile phone networks. To celebrate the Final Fantasy series' 20th anniversary, the game was released in Japan for the PlayStation Portable in 2007. The remake features improved graphics, the cutscenes and soundtrack from Final Fantasy Origins, and the bonus quest and dungeons from the GBA release. It additionally includes four new dungeons in which more character-specific equipment can be found, alongside powerful enemies and two new bosses. On February 25, 2010, Square Enix released a port of the PSP version modified with touchscreen controls for the iOS platform.

== Reception ==
Reception

Aggregate scores
Aggregator	Score
GameRankings	PSP: 65%
Metacritic	PSP: 63/100 iOS: 73/100; Pixel Remaster: 77/100
OpenCritic	Pixel Remaster: 81%

Review scores
Publication	Score
Famitsu	Famicom: 9/10, 9/10, 9/10, 8/10; WonderSwan: 8/10, 7/10, 8/10, 7/10; PS: 8/10, 7/10, 6/10, 6/10
GameSpot	PSP: 6/10
GameSpy	PSP: 3.5/5
IGN	PSP: 6.1/10 iOS: 6.8/10
Nintendo World Report	Pixel Remaster: 6.5/10
Push Square	Pixel Remaster: 6/10
RPGFan	Pixel Remaster: 72/100
TouchArcade	iOS: 4/5; Pixel Remaster: 3.5/5

Award
Publication	Award
Famicom Tsūshin (1989)	Best Scenario

According to Square, the original Famicom release sold 800,000 copies. As of March 2003, the game, including all re-releases at the time, had shipped 1.28 million copies worldwide, with 1.08 million of those copies being shipped in Japan and 200,000 abroad. As of September 2007 the PlayStation Portable version had shipped 90,000 copies in Japan and 70,000 in North America.

Upon release, Famicom Tsūshin (now Famitsu) gave the original Famicom version a score of 35 out of 40, based on a panel of four reviewers giving it ratings of 9, 9, 9 and 8 out of 10. This made it one of their three highest-rated games of 1988, along with Dragon Quest III (which scored 38/40) and Super Mario Bros. 3 (which scored 35/40). It was also one of the magazine's five highest-rated games up until 1988, along with Dragon Quest II (which scored 38/40) and Zelda II: The Adventure of Link (which scored 36/40). The 1989 "All Soft Catalog" issue of Famicom Tsūshin included Final Fantasy II in its list of the best games of all time, giving it the Best Scenario award. Retrospectively, G4 described the stat-building system as an "Innovation", noting that "computer RPGs took the "level" system wholesale from tabletop role-playing games and made it a genre staple, but FF2 eliminated levels altogether", but that what "sounds novel at first wound up being a huge mess". Famitsu magazine scored the WonderSwan version of the game a 30 out of 40. The game's leveling system was re-used in the SaGa series.

The PSP version was met with generally average reviews. GameSpot described the "more intriguing" story and "key words" system as "notable" in "the evolution of the series and genre" but called the level up system "chaotic" and noted that unlike previous versions, this was shipped without a version of Final Fantasy I. IGN described the "dialogue and story" as "much more interesting than" its predecessor and the "proficiency system not unlike what's found in The Elder Scrolls" as a "semi-innovation" for its time, but also complained about the gameplay. Both sources praised the graphics, however. GameSpy, while echoing similar complaints about the "quirky and sometimes confusing" leveling system and praises for the graphics, also applauded the supposed decrease in difficulty of the game, which in the reviewers' opinion eliminated the necessity to abuse the leveling system in order to progress in the game as the player had to do in the original game.

The Pixel Remaster of Final Fantasy II received mostly positive reviews. It received a score of 77/100 on Metacritic, and on OpenCritic, 81% of critics recommended the game. Jenni Lada of Siliconera gave the release a 7 out of 10, and felt it had aged the best out of the first three Final Fantasy games, citing it as "an entry that dared to be different" while praising its leveling system and story. Conversely, Chris Shive of Hardcore Gamer described it as "one of the weaker titles in the franchise" and felt it "[suffered] from a bit of middle child syndrome", but praised the story as being "vastly expanded on from the first game". Audra Bowling of RPGFan gave the release a score of 72 out of 100. She described the game as "divisive" and "the eccentric cousin" of the Final Fantasy series, and bemoaned the dungeons as "extremely poor" and "nightmarish affairs", but praised the story as being "strong for the era". Robert Ramsay of Push Square gave the fame a score of six out of ten, describing it as the "best version of a divisive Final Fantasy".

Nintendo World Report writer Donald Theriault gave the game a score of 6.5 out of 10, and praised the release for including quality-of-life features that "make the game something I could finish without cursing the whole way". Shaun Musgrave of TouchArcade gave the game 3.5 stars out of 5, calling it a "lovely remake of a game that people tend to either love or hate". He praised the game's story, but felt the Game Boy Advance version was superior due to the exclusion of the Dawn of Souls story from the Pixel Remaster.

== Legacy ==
A novelization Final Fantasy II: The Labyrinth of Nightmares was written by Terada and illustrated by Amano. It was published in Japan by Kadokawa Sneaker Bunko on March 20, 1989. A second novelization written by Takashi Umemura, which novelised the events of the first three Final Fantasy games, was published in Japan by Square Enix in 2019 and by Yen Press worldwide in 2020.

Multiple elements introduced in Final Fantasy II, including the character Cid and the chocobo, would become recurring staples of later Final Fantasy titles. Firion and the Emperor were the respective hero and villain representing Final Fantasy II in the fighting game spin-off Dissidia Final Fantasy (2009) and its sequels. The Emperor also featured as a character in the Different Future downloadable content expansion for Stranger of Paradise: Final Fantasy Origin (2022).

Due to both negative feedback and a lack of understanding within Square's staff outside Kawazu himself, the following game Final Fantasy III (1990) reverted to the more traditional role-playing systems of the original Final Fantasy. Kawazu would continue working with usage-based stat increases in his next project, Makai Tosho SaGa (The Final Fantasy Legend), released in 1989 for the Game Boy. This would become the first entry in the SaGa series, with Kawazu being heavily involved in most entries.

== See also ==
- SaGa, which continued the leveling system used in Final Fantasy II
- List of Square Enix video game franchises
