= Final Fantasy III =

1990 video game

- Developer: Square
- Publisher: Square
- Director: Hironobu Sakaguchi
- Producer: Masafumi Miyamoto
- Designers: Hiromichi Tanaka; Kazuhiko Aoki
- Programmer: Nasir Gebelli
- Artists: Koichi Ishii; Kazuko Shibuya; Yoshitaka Amano
- Writer: Kenji Terada
- Composer: Nobuo Uematsu
- Series: Final Fantasy
- Platform: Family Computer: iOS; Android; Windows; Nintendo Switch; PlayStation 4; Xbox Series X/S
- Release: April 27, 1990: Nintendo Family Computer; JP: April 27, 1990; Pixel Remaster; Android, iOS, Windows; WW: July 28, 2021; Nintendo Switch, PlayStation 4; WW: April 19, 2023; Xbox Series X/S; WW: September 26, 2024
- Genre: Role-playing
- Mode: Single-player

Final Fantasy III (Note: Japanese: ファイナルファンタジーIII, Hepburn: Fainaru Fantajī Surī) is a 1990 role-playing video game developed and published by Square for the Family Computer. The third installment in the Final Fantasy series, it follows four orphans from the village of Ur who are chosen by the world's crystals to defeat a great evil and return balance to the world. The gameplay returns to the traditional combat system of the original game, and adds a job system allowing players to switch between character classes with unique abilities.

Development of Final Fantasy III was handled by multiple series veterans including director Hironobu Sakaguchi, designers Hiromichi Tanaka and Kazuhiko Aoki, writer Kenji Terada, composer Nobuo Uematsu, and programmer Nasir Gebelli in his final contribution to the series. Production was a struggle due to data management, and new elements were added to encourage player experimentation. The artwork was a collaborative effort between Koichi Ishii as character and job designer, Yoshitaka Amano as monster designer, and Kazuko Shibuya as main sprite artist. When it completed development, it was described as one of the largest games on the system.

Upon its release in Japan, the game sold 1.4 million copies, and saw generally positive reviews, with most of the praise going to its job system. While ported to multiple platforms in later years, the original was not released outside Japan until 2021. A remake for the WonderSwan Color was planned but ultimately cancelled, while a 3D remake for the Nintendo DS was released internationally in 2006. The game saw the introduction of several recurring elements including a job system, summoned monsters and the Moogle. Terada also adapted it into a manga, and its characters and settings made appearances in later Final Fantasy titles.

== Gameplay ==
A battle encounter in Final Fantasy III. The four playable characters can equip character class-based jobs to access different abilities.

Final Fantasy III is a role-playing video game in which the player takes on the role of four unnamed warriors embarking on a mission to save their world from darkness. The party explores the world on foot, using a chocobo, by boat, and eventually by airship. Towns are visited to progress the main quest through interactions with characters, resting at inns to recover health, and buy weapons, items and equipment from dedicated shops using gil, the in-game currency. The overworld map opens up based on the player's progress through the story.

While exploring the overworld and dungeon environments, the player is pulled into random encounters with enemies; the display is split between the players on one side of the battle field and enemies on the other. The combat system uses a turn-based design carried over from earlier games; the party members can attack, defend, perform a special action, or use an item which can heal or remove negative status effects. Once all characters' actions have been selected, combat plays out between them and the enemy. If the same enemy is targeted with two attacks and the first kills it, the next attack defaults to the next living enemy. The party gains currency and experience points, which adds to a character's experience level and raises their health and attack power. If the party is defeated, the game must be reloaded from a previous save point.

A notable part of combat is a character class-based job system, which unlock dedicated abilities when equipped. The party starts out with the default Onion Knight job, but can gain and change jobs. Jobs include warriors, monks, black and white mages, ninjas, dragoon and summoners. Each job has a specific actions; summoners can call summoned monsters into battle to deal heavy damage, ninjas can steal, and dragoons can perform a jump attack. What job a character has equipped also changes what weapons and equipment they can use, and how the character levels up. Both changing jobs and unlocking job abilities are controlled with "capacity points" which are awarded to the party after battle, allowing the player to switch jobs at any time outside combat.

== Synopsis ==
=== Setting and characters ===
Final Fantasy III is set in an unnamed fantasy world protected by four elemental crystals. A millennium in the world's past, an ancient civilization based on a network of floating continents overused the power of light and triggered a disaster by upsetting the balance between light and darkness. This imbalance summoned the Cloud of Darkness, an entity which would return the world to nothingness. This threat was ended by two groups; the Warriors of Light and Warriors of Darkness. Balance was restored to the world, and the ancient civilization was destroyed. In the present, darkness is overtaking the world and spawning monsters, disrupting the balance again. The story opens in a region dubbed the Floating Continent, a land hovering above the rest of the planet.

The main characters of Final Fantasy III are four orphans from the village of Ur, chosen by the dying crystals to restore balance to the world as Warriors of Light; they begin using a default class dubbed the "Onion Knight", but can switch to any job role. The Warriors of Light meet several characters on their journey including Sara, a strong-willed princess; Desch, the last survivor of the ancient civilization; the elderly engineer Cid; Alus, prince of the surface kingdom of Saronia; and Doga and Unei, students of the ancient Magus Noah. The main antagonist is Xande, another student of Magus Noah who is creating the flood of darkness to achieve immortality. The Cloud of Darkness makes a brief appearance during the game's ending.

=== Plot ===
An earthquake opens up a previously hidden cavern in Altar Cave near the village of Ur on the Floating Continent. Four young orphans explore the new cave, fighting a monster which turns out to be a test of strength from the dying Wind Crystal. Dubbing them the Warriors of Light, the crystal grants them the last of its power and instructs them to restore balance to the world. The Warriors set out to explore the Floating Continent, which has seen increased attacks from monsters. On their journey they aid the princess Sara in pacifying a rogue djinn, find Desch during a quest to destroy a tower threatening the region, and gain access to the airship Invincible from Cid. The Warriors also receive power from the Fire Crystal, which is under attack from servants of the mage Xande.

After gaining the Invincible, they go beyond the Floating Continent for the first time in their lives, finding the surface world almost entirely flooded. On the surface, they complete further trials, receive the blessing of the Water Crystal, and help Alus reclaim his kingdom from his possessed father. The warriors then meet with Doga and Unei, who reveal Xande resents the gift of mortality their master gave and attacked the Crystals to halt time's flow, an attack which caused the Wind Crystal to raise the Floating Continent to safety. Gaining the final blessing from the Earth Crystal, and taking keys from Xande's most powerful servants, the Warriors and their allies break into his stronghold the Crystal Tower.

The Warriors of Light defeat Xande, but are too late to stop the imbalance he started, which summons the Cloud of Darkness who absorbs Xande and states its intent to return existence to the void. The Cloud of Darkness kills the Warriors, but Doga and Unei sacrifice themselves to revive them, allowing the Warriors to enter the world of darkness where the Dark Crystals reside and ally with the original Warriors of Darkness. The Warriors of Darkness sacrifice themselves to weaken the Cloud of Darkness, allowing the Warriors of Light to defeat and drive it back. The Crystals are revived and the world's balance restored, and the Warriors and their allies return to their old lives.

== Development ==
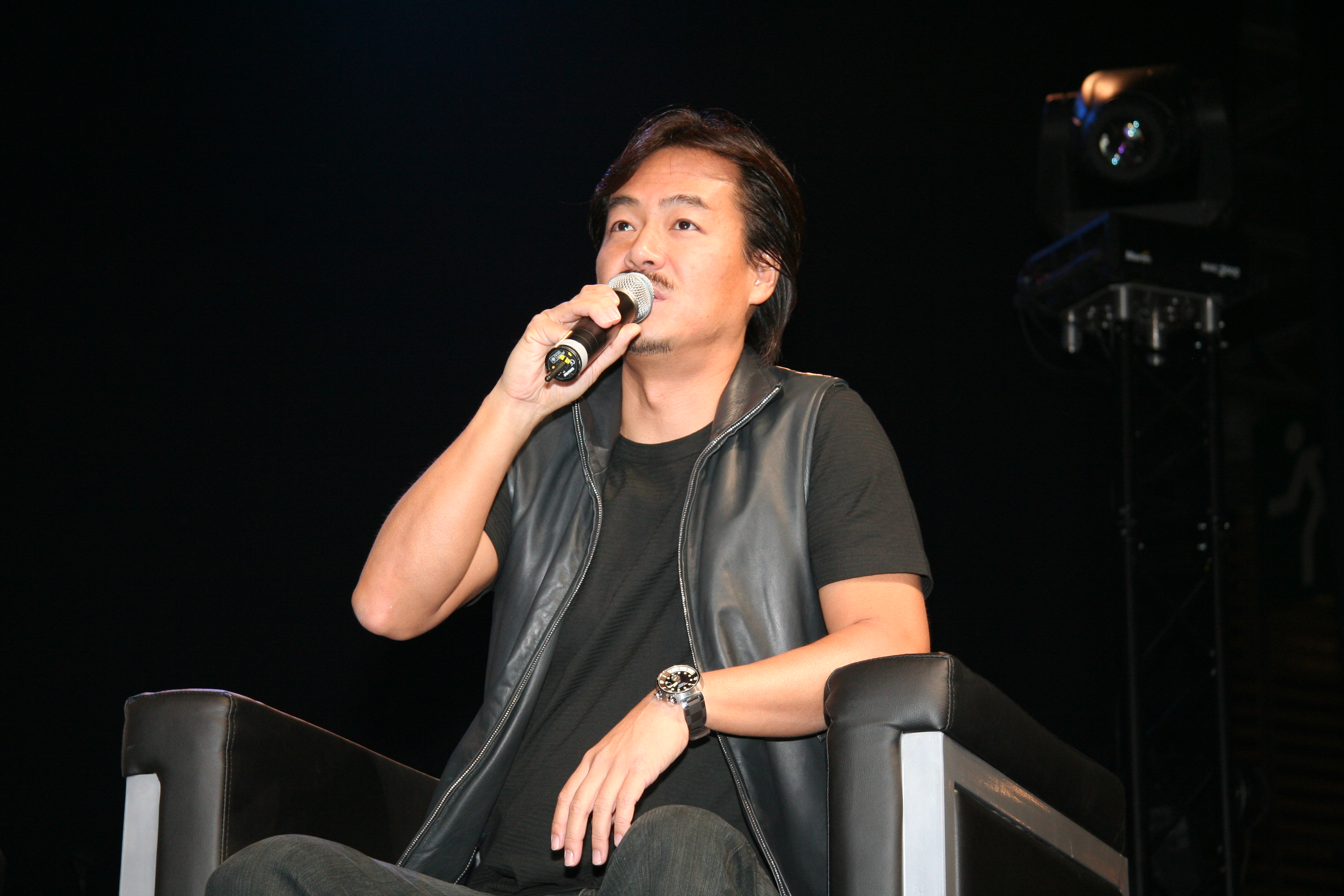
Series creator Hironobu Sakaguchi acted as director for Final Fantasy III.

Final Fantasy III was developed and published by series creator Square. Returning staff included series creator Hironobu Sakaguchi as director, and designers Hiromichi Tanaka and Kazuhiko Aoki. The producer was Masafumi Miyamoto, founder and former president of Square. It was the last Final Fantasy produced for Nintendo's Family Computer (Famicom) console, and was reportedly one of the largest games released for the platform as it required a 512 KB cartridge, the console's second-highest capacity. Tanaka described the game's development as "a struggle" due to how to properly use the game's limited data. The project was also the last original Final Fantasy to be programmed by Iranian-American programmer Nasir Gebelli, who had worked on the series since the first game. Midway through the development of the game, Gebelli was forced to return to Sacramento, California from Japan due to an expired work visa. The rest of the development staff followed him to Sacramento with necessary materials and equipment and finished production of the game there.

The battle system reverted to the traditional turn-based design of the original game following negative player feedback of Final Fantasy II's design being difficult to understand. The character class-based job system was suggested by Sakaguchi, who wanted to give players freedom to customize the party members; early in production it was dubbed the "Crystal" system. To differentiate character jobs within the game's limited combat options, each job was given a unique action such as the Dragoon's Jump ability. For Final Fantasy III, the team developed a dedicated script engine to manage character movements within environments later dubbed "Ether", which would be carried forward into future titles. The final dungeon was notably difficult due to the lack of save points, which was attributed to Sakaguchi removing them in annoyance when a play tester complained that the final area was too easy. Several concepts originally planned for Final Fantasy II were implemented, including summoned monsters, and the Moogle creatures that were originally designed for Final Fantasy II. Some of the technical aspects of handling battle animations, such as with the first completed summon Odin's signature attack, drew from the team's experience with creating scrolling environments in Rad Racer (1987).

Tanaka commented later that the story was given less focus due to the absence of Akitoshi Kawazu, and cited the world building as a collaborative process across the whole team. The scenario was written by Kenji Terada, who had worked on the previous two Final Fantasy titles; it would be his last contribution to the series, and he later felt it had disproportionately impacted his public image. As with previous titles due to hardware limits, the story was described by Sakaguchi as a series of connected events without strong characters. While Sakaguchi had previously not seen narrative as important, the death of his mother Aki in an accident during production of Final Fantasy III changed his outlook for future titles. As part of his feelings at the time, he incorporated a number of character death scenes into Final Fantasy III.

The monsters and summons were designed by Yoshitaka Amano, while the characters were designed by Koichi Ishii. Amano described the work schedule for the game as "tight". While designs for earlier games used black and white line art, for Final Fantasy III he drew in color first. The jobs were also were designed by Ishii, who was brought on by Sakaguchi after finishing work on Makai Toushi SaGa (1989). Ishii remembered feeling dissatisfied with the in-game character sprites he created due to the Famicom's limited color palette, but was intrigued that aspects of those limited designs were carried forward into later games such as the White Mage's robe design. The in-game sprite art was handled by Kazuko Shibuya, who remembered that the design team expanded for the first time for Final Fantasy III. She had trouble translating Amano's monster designs into the game and needed to make some compromises, such as changing the Cloud of Darkness's originally-upright pose into a horizontal one to fit the battle arena. The in-game airship Invincible was the largest asset in the game, taking up sixteen blocks of sprite art.

=== Music ===
The music for Final Fantasy III was created by regular series composer Nobuo Uematsu. Speaking in a 2025 interview, he remembered the composition for Final Fantasy III being different to the previous two titles due to input from Hiroshi Nakamura, a new sound programmer. It was during Final Fantasy III that Uematsu decided to make what became the "Prelude" and "Main Theme" recurring musical staples of the series, and also began creating dedicated pieces for comedic moments. The dungeon themes were written using minor chords to create a "sense of eeriness". One of the most notable themes, "Eternal Wind" was difficult for Uematsu to create as he wanted to create an echo effect that was not easy to accomplish within the hardware. During composition, Nakamura found a little-used fifth sound track on the Famicom that triggered when bugs occurred, which they used its sound to create a rolling drum beat for the battle theme's opening sting. Final Fantasy III was the last game Uematsu worked on to use the PSG sound chip, which he remembered as being "inconvenient, but strangely charming".

Final Fantasy III Original Sound Version, a compilation album of almost all of the music in the game, was released by Square/NTT Publishing in 1991, and subsequently re-released by NTT Publishing in 1994 and 2004. A vocal arrangement album entitled Final Fantasy III Yūkyū no Kaze Densetsu, or literally Final Fantasy III Legend of the Eternal Wind, contains a selection of musical tracks from the game, performed by Nobuo Uematsu and Dido, a duo composed of Michiaki Kato and Sizzle Ohtaka. The album was released by Data M in 1990 and by Polystar in 1994.

Selected tracks the game were featured in various Final Fantasy arranged music compilation albums, including Final Fantasy: Pray and Final Fantasy: Love Will Grow (with lyrical renditions performed by singer Risa Ohki), and the second and third albums from Uematsu's progressive metal group, The Black Mages. Several tracks from the game were subsequently remixed and featured in later Square or Square Enix titles, including Chocobo Racing and Final Fantasy Fables: Chocobo's Dungeon. Several pieces from the soundtrack remain popular today, and have been performed numerous times in Final Fantasy orchestral concert series such as the Tour de Japon: Music from Final Fantasy concert series and the Distant Worlds - Music from Final Fantasy series.

== Release ==
Final Fantasy III was published by Square for the Famicom on April 27, 1990. Multiple staff members including Ishii created promotional art for magazines during production. Amano created the cover art, working from the design instruction of a design featuring two swords. While there were plans for a localization outside Japan, Tanaka said this plan was scrapped so the team could focus on development for the upcoming Super Famicom. Ports of the game would be released through Nintendo's Virtual Console service in 2011 (Wii) and 2014 (Wii U and Nintendo 3DS); these versions became unavailable when the service shut down in 2019. It was also ported to iOS in 2011, Android in 2012, and Windows Phone in 2013. The first international release of its original version came as part of the Final Fantasy Pixel Remaster series, initially releasing on Windows and mobile platforms on July 28, 2021.

=== Cancelled WonderSwan Color remake ===
Bandai unveiled their WonderSwan Color handheld system in 2000 and had immediately headed up a deal with Square to release enhanced remakes of their first three Final Fantasy titles on the new console. Although Final Fantasy and Final Fantasy II were both released within a year of the announcement, Final Fantasy III was ultimately delayed from its late 2001 release date, even after Bandai picked up the game's publishing rights. While a port of Final Fantasy IV was eventually released for the WonderSwan Color, Square remained silent regarding Final Fantasy III. Although the game was never formally cancelled, the official website was taken offline once production of the WonderSwan Color consoles ceased in 2002. In 2007, Hiromichi Tanaka explained in an interview that the WonderSwan Color remake had been abandoned because the size and structure of the coding of the original Famicom game was too difficult to recreate on the WonderSwan Color.

=== 3D Remake ===
Following the WonderSwan's failure and the merger of Square with Enix in 2003, the newly-formed Square Enix sought to expand its game library onto more platforms, with the company promising to deliver a Final Fantasy III remake. Final Fantasy III was eventually remade by Square Enix and Matrix Software for the Nintendo DS, which had seen worldwide commercial success, with Tanaka returning as director and executive producer. The game was a complete 3D remake with an expanded story and CGI opening, while carrying over gameplay elements. The characters and jobs were redesigned by Akihiko Yoshida. The remake was released in 2006, and saw ports to other platforms in later years.

== Reception ==
Reception

Aggregate score
Aggregator	Score
Metacritic	79/100 (PC)

Review scores
Publication	Score
Famitsu	9/10, 9/10, 10/10, 8/10 (FC)
Hardcore Gamer	8/10 (Pixel Remaster)
Nintendo World Report	7/10 (Pixel Remaster)
RPGFan	8/10 (Pixel Remaster)
TouchArcade	4.5/5 (Pixel Remaster)
RPGSite	7/10 (Pixel Remaster)
Family Computer Magazine	26.60/30 (FC)

Within its first week on sale, Final Fantasy III reportedly sold 500,000 copies. As of March 2003, the original Famicom game had shipped 1.4 million copies in Japan, outselling the domestic releases of the previous two Final Fantasy games.

The four reviewers of Famicom Tsūshin (now Famitsu) were generally positive, giving praise to the job system and combat design, with one reviewer feeling that it surpassed the design of Dragon Quest IV (1990) in some parts. One of the reviewers mentioned the story moved too quickly for comfort, leaving them confused about events, while two others criticized the lack of save points in dungeons. Family Computer Magazine enjoyed the return to the first game's traditional combat system while noting its new additions, and found the job system entertaining to experiment with. In 2006, readers of the Japanese gaming magazine Famitsu voted the original Final Fantasy III the eighth best video game of all-time, above Dragon Quest IV.

The Windows release of the Pixel Remaster version earned a score of 79 points out of 100 on review aggregate website Metacritic. In his review of the first three Pixel Remaster titles, RPG Site's Scott White called Final Fantasy III "the easiest one to recommend to long-time fans" due to the replayability lent by its job system and the differences from its later 3D remake. Shaun Musgrave of Touch Arcade was very positive about the Pixel Remaster release compared to the 3D remake, enjoying its scale and implementation of the job system while noting that it might be difficult for series newcomers.

Zach Wilkerson of RPGFan positively noted its experimental design for its time and enjoyed the narrative despite its simplicity, but also noted a lack of depth with its mechanics and the need to grind for progression. Hardcore Gamer's Chris Shive praised the game as a welcome refinement of mechanics introduced in the first two Final Fantasy games, but admitted some of its elements would appear archaic to modern players. Nintendo World Report's Jordan Rudek noted the storytelling as saying within series conventions, and while positively noting the job system he felt it lacked depth compared to later iterations. His main praise went to the Pixel Remaster version's updated visuals and updates to help players. The Pixel Remaster's reworked score met with general praise.

== Legacy ==
A manga adaptation of the game titled Legend of the Eternal Wind, from Final Fantasy III was written by Terada and illustrated by Yu Kinutani. Originally serialized in Kadokawa Shoten's Maru Katsu Famicom magazine between 1990 and 1992, it was collected into three tankōbon under Kadokawa Shoten's Dragon Comics imprint. A novelization written by Takashi Umemura, which novelised the events of the first three Final Fantasy games, was published in Japan by Square Enix in 2019 and by Yen Press worldwide in 2020.

The Onion Knight and Cloud of Darkness were the respective hero and villainess representing Final Fantasy III in the fighting game spin-off Dissidia Final Fantasy (2009) and its sequels. Several aspects of Final Fantasy III, including characters such as the Cloud of Darkness and locations like the Crystal Tower, were incorporated into the world and lore of Final Fantasy XIV (2013).

== See also ==
- List of Square Enix video game franchises
