= Final Fantasy Pixel Remaster =

Series of Final Fantasy video game remasters

- Promotional header for the Final Fantasy Pixel Remaster
- Developers: Tose, Square Enix
- Publisher: Square Enix
- Artist: Kazuko Shibuya
- Composer: Nobuo Uematsu
- Series: Final Fantasy
- Engine: Unity
- Platforms: iOS; Android; Windows; PlayStation 4; Nintendo Switch; Xbox Series X/S
- Release: July 28, 2021: Final Fantasy I, II, III; iOS, Android, Windows; WW: July 28, 2021; PS4, NS; WW: April 19, 2023; Xbox Series X/S; WW: September 26, 2024; Final Fantasy IV; iOS, Android, Windows; WW: September 8, 2021; PS4, NS; WW: April 19, 2023; Xbox Series X/S; WW: September 26, 2024; Final Fantasy V; iOS, Android, Windows; WW: November 10, 2021; PS4, NS; WW: April 19, 2023; Xbox Series X/S; WW: September 26, 2024; Final Fantasy VI; iOS, Android, Windows; WW: February 23, 2022; PS4, NS; WW: April 19, 2023; Xbox Series X/S; WW: September 26, 2024
- Genre: Role-playing
- Mode: Single-player

Final Fantasy Pixel Remaster (Note: Japanese: ファイナルファンタジー ピクセルリマスター, Hepburn: Fainaru Fantajī Pikuseru Rimasutā) is a series of video game remasters of the first six installments in the Final Fantasy role-playing video game series developed by Tose and Square Enix and published by Square Enix. The series includes remasters of the original versions of Final Fantasy (1987), Final Fantasy II (1988), Final Fantasy III (1990), Final Fantasy IV (Note: Initially titled Final Fantasy II in North America.) (1991), Final Fantasy V (1992), and Final Fantasy VI (Note: Initially titled Final Fantasy III in North America.) (1994), available standalone or in the Final Fantasy I–VI Collection (Note: Also known as Final Fantasy I–VI Pixel Remaster Collection digitally.) compilation. It is notably the first release of the original Final Fantasy III outside of Japan, as only the 2006 3D remake had released internationally prior to the Pixel Remaster.

The Pixel Remasters feature rearranged music supervised by original composer Nobuo Uematsu, redrawn sprite art by original artist Kazuko Shibuya, an updated user interface, additional content such as an illustration gallery and bestiary, and other enhancements. Initially released on iOS, Android, and Windows, the games had a staggered release date between July 2021 and February 2022 before all six games released together on PlayStation 4 and Nintendo Switch in April 2023 in commemoration of the franchise's 35th anniversary. The games released on Xbox Series X and Series S in September 2024. The Pixel Remaster series marks the first time the original Final Fantasy and Final Fantasy II were released for PC, as well as the debut of the first six numbered entries on Xbox consoles.

The series received generally positive reviews, with critics praising the upgraded presentation, rescored music, quality-of-life enhancements, included extras, and balancing, while criticizing its technical issues at launch, English font, and the lack of additional content featured in earlier versions. The series has sold over six million units worldwide.

== Content ==
Included titles
1987	Final Fantasy
1988	Final Fantasy II
1989
1990	Final Fantasy III
1991	Final Fantasy IV
1992	Final Fantasy V
1993
1994	Final Fantasy VI

The Pixel Remaster series remasters the first six installments of the Final Fantasy series originally released between 1987 and 1994 on the Nintendo Entertainment System and Super Nintendo Entertainment System. It marks the first international release of the original Final Fantasy III, the first release of I and II on PC, the first widescreen release of V and VI, and the first release of I through VI on Xbox.

Visual comparison of Final Fantasy (1987) (top) and the Pixel Remaster version (bottom). The player character is in the overworld visiting the city Cornelia.

An illustration gallery featuring character, monster, and concept art done by long-time series artist Yoshitaka Amano, a music player, and a bestiary of enemies encountered by players throughout the games have been implemented. The subsequent Nintendo Switch and PlayStation 4 releases added additional gameplay enhancers such as a newly swappable classic pixel typeface for the user interface, CRT filters, the ability to toggle between the remastered soundtrack and the original compositions for each game, multipliers for the amount of experience points and gil earned after battles, a toggle for disabling random encounters, as well as a Quick Save function also able to be used within dungeons. These features were eventually patched into the Windows and mobile releases in 2024.

The Pixel Remasters lack the changes and additional content implemented in other versions of the games, most notably the dungeons, superbosses, jobs, and other bonus content featured in the Game Boy Advance versions (Note: Also known as the Final Fantasy Advance project in Japan.) and later iterations based upon them, such as Final Fantasy IV: The Complete Collection.

== Development and release ==
The Final Fantasy Pixel Remaster series was announced at E3 2021 with games to be published on iOS, Android, and Microsoft Windows via Steam.

Preceding the launch of the Pixel Remaster series, the prior 2010 mobile releases of Final Fantasy and II, 2014 mobile releases of V and VI, as well as their 2015 Steam iteration, were delisted from digital platforms as of July 28, 2021. The 3D Nintendo DS remakes of Final Fantasy III and IV were retitled and remain available on digital platforms.

On December 18, 2022, the 35th anniversary of the Final Fantasy franchise, Square Enix announced the Pixel Remaster series would release on Nintendo Switch and PlayStation 4 in spring 2023. The console versions released on April 19, 2023, alongside the Final Fantasy I-VI Pixel Remaster -FF35th Anniversary Edition- physical collector's edition including all six games, and introduced new quality-of-life enhancements; the selection of a pixel-based font, modifiers for the encounter rate and amount of EXP, "gil", and Ability Points gained, rebalanced difficulty, and the selection between the original NES (for the former three games) and SNES (for the latter three games) or remastered soundtracks. Furthermore, the remastered soundtrack of Final Fantasy VI featured vocals from the Opera House scene in Japanese, English, French, German, Italian, Spanish and Korean.

On January 30, 2024, the Steam and mobile versions were updated to include the quality-of-life features introduced in the console release with version 1.1.0. On September 26, 2024, at Tokyo Game Show, all six games were released on Xbox Series X and Series S. In March 2025, the game was updated to version 1.2.0, which mostly included UI and control improvements, as well as bug fixes.

== Reception ==
Aggregate review scores
Game	Year	Metacritic	OpenCritic
Final Fantasy Pixel Remaster	2021	PC: 80 (Note: Based on 12 reviews.)	87%
Final Fantasy II Pixel Remaster	2021	PC: 77 (Note: Based on 10 reviews.)	68%
Final Fantasy III Pixel Remaster	2021	PC: 79 (Note: Based on 10 reviews.)	77%
Final Fantasy IV Pixel Remaster	2021	PC: 83 (Note: Based on 9 reviews.)	88%
Final Fantasy V Pixel Remaster	2021	PC: 82 (Note: Based on 14 reviews.)	95%
Final Fantasy VI Pixel Remaster	2022	PC: 87 (Note: Based on 14 reviews.)	91%
Final Fantasy Pixel Remaster: FF35th Anniversary Edition	2023	PS4: 87 (Note: Based on 15 reviews.); NS: 84 (Note: Based on 17 reviews.)	

The Final Fantasy Pixel Remaster series received generally positive reception. According to review aggregator Metacritic, all six remasters, as well as the compiled collection featured in the -FF35th Anniversary Edition- collectors edition, received "generally favorable" reviews for Windows, PlayStation 4, and Nintendo Switch.

Critics lauded the updated presentation for the Pixel Remasters, particularly the rearranged soundtracks.

The lack of content available in prior versions was criticized. Criticism was also pointed at the original English language font.

Following the success of the Pixel Remaster series, Square Enix has considered potential re-releases of other legacy games.

=== Sales ===
The series has sold over three million units worldwide as of September 2023. An additional three million sales have been reported as of December 2025, bringing total sales to six million units worldwide.

== See also ==
- List of Final Fantasy video games
