= Final Fantasy I & II: Dawn of Souls =

- Developers: Square Enix; Tose
- Publisher: Nintendo
- Director: Kosuke Miyamoto
- Producer: Takashi Tokita
- Designer: Hiromine Ōkura
- Programmer: Kazuhito Narita
- Artist: Gen Kobayashi
- Composer: Ryoue Takagi
- Series: Final Fantasy
- Platform: Game Boy Advance
- Release: JP: July 29, 2004; NA: November 29, 2004; EU: December 10, 2004
- Genre: Role-playing
- Mode: Single player

Final Fantasy I & II: Dawn of Souls (Note: Known in Japan as Final Fantasy I & II Advance (Japanese: ファイナルファンタジーI・II アドバンス, Hepburn: Fainaru Fantaji I・II Adobansu)) is a 2004 video game compilation developed by Square Enix and Tose and published by Nintendo for the Game Boy Advance. The package features the WonderSwan Color remakes of Final Fantasy (1987) and Final Fantasy II (1988), the first two games in the Final Fantasy series originally released for the Nintendo Entertainment System, which were previously featured in the 2002 PlayStation compilation Final Fantasy Origins. Apart from an enhanced presentation and quality-of-life improvements, the collection features new dungeons for the first game and a playable epilogue for the second game.

Producer Takashi Tokita was inspired to develop the collection by the complexity of modern handheld titles, hoping to provide an alternative made with children in mind. The systems and balance of the games were adjusted to be more appealing to children, and new content was added for older players familiar with the originals. The collection was announced and released in 2004 in Japan following a brief delay, and released in Western territories the same year. It received generally favorable reviews, with critics praising the retention and increased accessibility of its gameplay mechanics, long playtime, and visual and audio enhancements. However, some noted the relatively simple narratives and limited appeal to players more accustomed to the later, more cinematic Final Fantasy titles.

== Overview ==
A typical battle scene from the remake of Final Fantasy II

Final Fantasy I & II: Dawn of Souls packages remade versions of the first two games in the Final Fantasy series: the original Final Fantasy and Final Fantasy II released for the Nintendo Entertainment System. The remakes were originally developed for the WonderSwan Color and previously ported to the PlayStation in the compilation Final Fantasy Origins (2002). The games' presentation has been updated toward 16-bit standards, with redrawn sprites and backgrounds as well as rearranged versions of the soundtracks. Dawn of Souls carries over the dash function and bestiary feature included in Origins but lacks the art galleries and full-motion cinematic sequences, instead adding new in-game cutscenes, an improved translation, and other quality-of-life improvements, such as the ability to save at any time. Changes to the first Final Fantasy include a raised level cap and a magic system that uses a conventional pool of magic points rather than the original's level-based casting limits. Defeating one of the Four Fiends unlocks a corresponding randomly generated dungeon that contains powerful equipment as well as bosses drawn from later Final Fantasy titles. The battle system of Final Fantasy II has been adjusted to allow character statistics to rise through normal combat rather than requiring characters to attack one another. A new playable epilogue in Final Fantasy II details the fate of characters Scott, Josef, Ricard, and Minwu.

== Development and release ==
Final Fantasy I & II: Dawn of Souls was produced by Takashi Tokita and directed by Kosuke Miyamoto. Tokita was inspired by recent handheld games, which he felt were often too complex for children; in revamping the original Final Fantasy titles, he hoped to recapture the sensibility and craft of systems made with children in mind. The conversion was handled by Tose, with Kazuhito Narita as the lead programmer and Hiromine Ōkura as the lead designer. The games' systems and balance were adjusted to ensure that the target audience of elementary school-aged children would find them enjoyable, and new elements were added to grant those who completed the originals a new experience. The Japanese version features the option to switch between kanji and hiragana text, as Tokita observed that children tend to skip over kanji they cannot read. The remake of the first Final Fantasy was given the same magic system as Final Fantasy II to unify the game systems and make gameplay easier, though the second game's proficiency system was retained as a unique mechanic. Familiar recovery items in the series were added to the original Final Fantasy, with the names standardized to avoid confusion. The characters, illustrated by Gen Kobayashi, were made cuter compared to their original versions to be more appealing to children. The music was arranged by a team led by Ryoue Takagi under the supervision of series composer Nobuo Uematsu.

In April 2004, Square Enix announced the collection, titled Final Fantasy I & II Advance, for a July 2004 release in Japan. Originally scheduled for release on July 15, the game was delayed to address unexpected bugs found at the last minute. The delay came after television commercials had already begun airing promoting the original date. The game would subsequently be released on July 29. The collection was given the subtitle Dawn of Souls in Western territories; it was released in North America by Nintendo of America on November 29, and in Europe on December 10.

== Reception ==
Reception

Aggregate score
Aggregator	Score
Metacritic	79/100

Review scores
Publication	Score
1Up.com	7/10
Electronic Gaming Monthly	9/10, 8.5/10, 8/10
Eurogamer	5/10
Game Informer	9/10
GameSpot	7.2/10
GameSpy	4/5
GamesRadar+	78%
GameZone	9/10
IGN	8.5/10
Nintendo Power	4/5, 4.5/5, 4/5, 4/5, 4.5/5
Nintendo World Report	9/10

Final Fantasy I & II: Dawn of Souls was met with "generally favorable" reviews according to the review aggregator website Metacritic. The package was named GBA Game of the Month for November 2004 by IGN, and was rated 76th in Nintendo Power's Top 200 Games list in 2006. Eduardo Zacarias of GameZone called it "the most perfectly packaged Game Boy Advance game" and "a dream come true for fans of the genre". Jonathan Metts of Planet Gamecube characterized the package as "simply irresistible" and "a must-have for any handheld RPG fan", describing the games as "unbelievably addictive and solid" despite their "old-school" design and remaining roughness. Jeremy Dunham of IGN found it "definitely worth a look," particularly for those who never experienced the games originally, though he noted that those who own Origins would have less incentive. Shane Bettenhausen of Electronic Gaming Monthly (EGM) labelled it "the best RPG value on GBA, no contest," while John Ricciardi of the same publication stated that nostalgic fans and curious newcomers "really can't go wrong". Christopher Shepperd of Nintendo Power described the value of two classic RPGs in one cartridge as "astronomical", estimating the combined games to provide 80 hours of playtime. Daryl Vassar of GameSpy concluded that role-playing fans who had not already purchased Origins "owe it to themselves to pick this one up," citing the roughly 80 to 100 hours of content and the convenience of saving anywhere within the game. Bethany Massimilla of GameSpot judged the combined package "worthwhile for old-school RPG fans and patient neophytes."

The gameplay was praised for retaining the original games' exploration and turn-based combat while adding practical adjustments for modern players. Zacarias highlighted the freedom to assemble parties from six classes in the first game and the second game's system of upgrading abilities that are used more extensively. Vassar noted that experimenting with more difficult class combinations lent significant replay value to the first game. Metts and Dunham detailed the package's modifications, such as the first game's increased level cap and conventional magic point set-up, the ability to save at any time, and a more forgiving proficiency progression in the second game that reduced the need to attack one's own party. Metts observed that the first game's changes would increase accessibility for newcomers while potentially annoying purists, and doubted the second game's changes would raise much complaints due to the previously "stupid" method of increasing hit points. Dunham admired the first game's new dungeons and the second game's extended post-game storyline for lengthening the experience. Bettenhausen observed that while simple button-mashing suffices for ordinary battles, the complex dungeons, strong bosses, and hidden secrets still demand thought. Kevin Gifford of EGM found the remakes "way easy," having finished the first game's main story in seventeen hours without a single death, yet viewed the reduced difficulty as beneficial for both novices and veterans seeking the extra scenarios. Massimilla confirmed that the battles progress quickly, and Nich Maragos of 1Up.com deemed the rebalanced systems more accessible than the originals, though he still found the second game's proficiency system somewhat vague.

The narratives were characterized as functional but limited by modern standards, with Zacarias, Bettenhausen, and Eurogamer's Rob Fahey observing that the plots lack the dramatic depth, memorable personalities, and cinematic presentation of later Final Fantasy titles. Zacarias warned newer fans not to expect "a dramatic plot with an assortment of characters you'll come to love," noting the absence of cutscenes and meaningful character development. Vassar described the first entry as "practically story-free" and the second as the series' "first story- and character-centric" outing. Dunham praised the improved English translation for clarifying loose plot threads and adding new conclusions, while Andrew Reiner of Game Informer valued the second game's extended story for outlining the fates of its supporting characters. Nintendo Power likewise noted the second game's more sophisticated storytelling relative to the first. Metts said the fresh translations rendered the "threadbare" storylines clean, well-written, and closer to the original Japanese text. He found further appeal in the second game's new playable epilogue for meaningfully expanding its comparatively more complex, character-driven plot.

The presentation was frequently considered to have been successfully updated within the hardware's limits. Zacarias found the graphics "downright pleasing to the eye," citing the detailed monsters and colorful backgrounds as impressive for the Game Boy Advance's capabilities. Dunham commended the "Super NES-quality" graphics and sound for giving the games a sharper presentation compared to the original NES versions. Massimilla described the environments and sprites as clean and distinct, though noted the latter were small and simply detailed, and said the richness of the score allowed it to hold up. Metts deemed the visuals on par with the Super NES series entries, praising the sprites while calling the animations simple. Zacarias, Metts, and EGM's John Ricciardi recommended that players use headphones to experience the score and sound effects, with Zacarias ranking the soundtrack among the best on the system, and Ricciardi singling out the first game's music as "awesome".

A few reviewers stressed the games' age and limited appeal beyond hardcore fans. The Games Radar reviewer argued that fans of modern series like Golden Sun would likely be bored by the basic battle systems, repetitive environments, and clichéd stories. Fahey contended the package remains a "weary slog along a levelling-up treadmill" that fails to compete with stronger GBA RPGs and "fall[s] between two stools", being excessively altered for a pure historical curiosity yet insufficiently modernized for general players. Maragos similarly concluded that the games, while historically significant and polished to their best form, are "not really the best RPGs on the system." Joe Juba of Game Informer appreciated the retained "fun factor" yet regretted that the ability to save anywhere and the magic point system had extinguished much of the originals' "relentless" difficulty and the gravity of key encounters. Metts cautioned that players whose first experience was Final Fantasy VII (1997) or a later game may find the compilation unsuitable due to the absence of puzzles, mini-games, and substantial cinematic storytelling.
