= Kazuko Shibuya =

Japanese video game artist

- 渋谷 員子
- Born: September 4, 1965 (age 61); Japan
- Occupation: Video game artist
- Years active: 1986–present
- Employer: Square Enix
- Notable work: Final Fantasy series; SaGa series

Kazuko Shibuya (Japanese: 渋谷 員子, Hepburn: Shibuya Kazuko; born September 4, 1965) is a Japanese video game artist. She is best known for her work with Square (now Square Enix), in particular with the Final Fantasy series.

== Biography ==
Shibuya was born in 1965. While in middle school, she began creating illustrations and animations inspired by anime series including Space Battleship Yamato and Galaxy Express 999. As a high schooler she enrolled in a technical school to study animation and worked part-time for animation studios on popular anime including Transformers, Area 88, and Obake no Q-taro. In 1986, as she was losing interest in animation work, she was recruited by video game company Square.

Shibuya's first work for Square was providing illustrations for Alpha's game manual and graphics for several games in development. In 1987, prompted by the success of Enix's Dragon Quest the previous year, Square released Final Fantasy. Shibuya created graphics including characters, spells, monsters, fonts, menus, and the game's opening bridge scene. By Final Fantasy II, she was one of two designers creating all the pixel art for the game.

Shibuya went on to design graphics for other Final Fantasy games, most notably the iconic chibi versions of characters, monsters, fonts, and menus. She was the primary pixel artist for many well-known games including entries in the SaGa series and Mana series (of which she created all the graphics for the first game).

In 2019, during a lecture at Japan Expo Paris, Shibuya was invited by Women in Games to be a member of honour.

== Works ==
credits
Year	Title	Role(s)
1986	Alpha	Manual illustration
1986	King's Knight	Graphic design
1986	Suishō no Dragon	Graphic design
1987	Rad Racer	Graphic design
1987	The 3D Battles of WorldRunner	Graphic design
1987	Final Fantasy	Graphic design, monster design
1988	Final Fantasy II	Graphic design, monster design
1990	Final Fantasy III	Graphic design, monster design
1991	Final Fantasy Adventure	Graphic design
1991	Final Fantasy IV	Package design
1992	Romancing SaGa	Character pixel art
1992	Final Fantasy V	Character pixel art, package design
1994	Final Fantasy VI	Graphic director, character pixel art
1995	Romancing SaGa 3	Character pixel art
1997	SaGa Frontier	Character pixel art
1999	SaGa Frontier 2	Character pixel art
2000	Final Fantasy IX	Sub character graphic design
2001	Blue Wing Blitz	Graphic director
2003	Final Fantasy Crystal Chronicles	Menu graphic design, user interface
2005	Code Age Commanders	Menu design
2007	Yosumin!	Design director
2008	Nanashi no Game	Character graphic design
2008	Final Fantasy IV: The After Years	Character pixel art
2009	Season of Mystery: The Cherry Blossom Murders	Art director
2010	Final Fantasy Dimensions	2D pixel art
2010	Dragon Quest Monsters: Wanted!	monster and background graphic design
2014	Terra Battle	Monster graphic design
2015	Final Fantasy Dimensions II	Chief designer, character pixel art, menu design
2015	Final Fantasy: Brave Exvius	Character supervisor, Katy Perry’s character design
2020	Final Fantasy Pixel Remaster	Lead pixel artist
