= Space Eggs =

1981 video game

- Publisher: Sirius Software
- Programmers: Apple II; Nasir Gebelli; Atari 8-bit Dan Thompson
- Platforms: Apple II, Atari 8-bit
- Release: 1981
- Genre: Fixed shooter
- Mode: Single-player

Space Eggs is a fixed shooter video game for the Apple II computer programmed by Nasir Gebelli and published by Sirius Software in 1981. A port to Atari 8-bit computers by Dan Thompson was released the same year. Space Eggs is an unofficial version of the arcade video game Moon Cresta.

== Gameplay ==
The player moves a ship from side to side across the bottom of the screen while trying to avoid colliding with or being shot by the aliens attacking above. Each level pits the player against multiple aliens of a particular class, which become more difficult to destroy as the levels progress.

The game begins with a view of the player's three ships docked together. The first ship, which is the smallest and has only one cannon, splits off from the others and gameplay begins. If an alien touches the ship or successfully hits it with a bomb, the ship is destroyed and replaced by the next one in the set. The second and third ships have progressively wider wingspans and two cannons each. The game ends when all ships are lost.

Aliens begin as harmless, multi-colored "eggs" bobbing randomly above the ship, and must be shot to release the creatures within. There are four classes of aliens:

- Spiders, insectoid creatures that move randomly around the screen and are worth 15 points.
- Lips, which move a bit more aggressively. They are worth 30 points.
- Wolves, which move randomly and often descend to the level of the spaceship. They are worth 45 points.
- Fuzzballs, which bounce up and down rapidly if they are to the left of the ship, or move to the bottom of the playfield and slide horizontally toward the ship if they are to the right (guaranteeing destruction; this appears to be a bug). They are worth 80 points.

In the first four waves, all eggs hatch to the same creature. In subsequent waves, eggs hatch random creatures. The wave resets to 1 when the player dies.

If the ship is in the second stage (medium width), and the player has scored at least 1,000 points, an opportunity to dock with the first stage will be given. The ship descends from the top of the screen and must be caught by lining up with the ship precisely. If successful, the merged ship will have 3 cannons.

== Reception ==
Space Eggs reached the top spot on Softalk's best-selling software list.

The Addison-Wesley Book of Atari Software 1983 gave it a "B" rating, calling it "cute and challenging."
