= Gorgon (video game) =

1981 video game

- Developer: Sirius Software
- Publisher: Sirius Software
- Designer: Nasir Gebelli
- Platform: Apple II
- Release: June 1981
- Genre: Scrolling shooter
- Mode: Single-player

Gorgon is a clone of the arcade video game Defender, a horizontally scrolling shooter, for the Apple II. It was programmed by Nasir Gebelli and published by Sirius Software in June 1981.

== Gameplay ==
Flying over the landscape without any visible enemies. The radar view at the top shows the whole level.

In Gorgon, the player flies a spaceship across a side-scrolling landscape while protecting civilians on the ground from aliens that drop down from the top of the screen to try to carry them off.

The game uses keyboard controls, with the A, Z, and left/right arrow keys for movement and the space bar for firing.

== Development ==
The graphics were drawn with Sirius's own E-Z Draw software (1980).

== Reception ==
By June 1982, Gorgon had sold 23,000 copies, making it one of the best-selling computer games at the time. Bill Kunkel of Electronic Games called the game "another winner from ace designer Nasir" and "fine home version" of Defender, only criticizing the Apple II's lack of joystick support at the time. BYTE stated that Gorgon "is well programmed and much more enjoyable than the arcade version [and] should provide many hours of enjoyment ... Rest assured that you Nasir Gebelli fans will not be disappointed by this one!"
