= Opera House (Final Fantasy VI) =

Video game level

- Celes sings during the opera segment of the level in Final Fantasy VI Advance, with lyrics shown on screen.
- Created by: Square
- Genre: Fantasy

In-universe information
- Type: Opera house
- Location: Jidoor

The Opera House is a level in the 1994 role-playing video game Final Fantasy VI developed by Square. Taking place partway through the game, it occurs when the game's characters require an airship, the only one of its kind, owned by the adventurer and gambler Setzer. The character Celes, a former Imperial general, is a near-double of a famous opera diva named Maria, who Setzer is planning to kidnap during a performance. The characters plan for Celes to switch places with Maria, causing her to be kidnapped in Maria's place and allowing the others to sneak aboard the airship and convince Setzer to let them use it. During the opera, "Maria and Draco", Celes "sings" the song "Aria di Mezzo Carattere" in a cutscene, before the opera is attacked by the recurring antagonist and monster Ultros, forcing the other characters to stage a rescue.

The Opera House level is considered by critics to be an early example of "games as art", praised for its gameplay, sprite artwork and music, and Celes' performance is seen as one of the most iconic and memorable cutscenes in gaming history, noted for the strong emotions evoked in players despite hardware limitations.

== Level content ==
The level itself starts after the game's former protagonist, Terra Branford, has fled the party, upon the realization that she is an Esper, a form of magical creature sought after by the game's main villains to that point, the Gestahl Empire. The remaining party must travel to the Empire's Magitek Research Facility, where other Espers are imprisoned, in order to understand what the Empire means to do. To reach the facility, located on a remote island, the party decides to gain the assistance of Setzer, a gambler who owns the world's only functional airship.

As Setzer is difficult to contact, the party, realizing that General Celes looks similar to the opera diva Maria, formulates a plan. Knowing that Setzer plans to kidnap Maria, they seek to have him kidnap Celes instead, allowing them to convince him to lend them the airship. Though nervous, Celes heads backstage to prepare, before emerging onstage dressed as Maria. A cutscene initiates in which Celes sings the opera, the player given choices about which lyrics are the correct ones. Post-performance, the perspective completely shifts to the rest of the party, who notice that the villain Ultros is planning to drop a 4-ton stage weight on Celes, realizing that she is in mortal danger. In a timed segment, the party rushes across the rafters in order to stop him. The party eventually tumbles to the stage, initiating a battle with Ultros. While the audience is initially shocked, they believe it is part of the show and applaud upon Ultros' defeat.

Setzer kidnaps Celes at the close of the show, the curtain closing and ending the segment. The rest of the party stows away on Setzer's ship in order to confront him in the subsequent scene.

== Development ==
When the opera scene was originally conceived, it was summed up as only a single sentence by Hironobu Sakaguchi - "an event to be held at the opera". It was inspired by The Man Who Knew Too Much by Alfred Hitchcock, which also included a suspenseful back-and-forth between events on stage and behind the scenes. Nobuo Uematsu worked on the musical composition of the scene, including "Aria Di Mezzo Carattere", while Hideo Minaba worked on the graphics. While Sakaguchi recommended that Yoshinori Kitase watch an opera as reference for the scene, he ultimately did not see one and supervised creation of the scene entirely from imagination. The lyrics were written by Kitase as a "love letter" to his future wife, who he was dating at the time. Much later, Kitase ended up watching one of Uematsu's orchestral concerts in the Royal Albert Hall, where The Man Who Knew Too Much was filmed.

In Final Fantasy VI's Pixel Remaster version, the opera scene was modified, receiving 3D backgrounds for a HD-2D feel and sung vocals in Japanese, English, French, German, Italian, Spanish and Korean. This was explained as a "half-joking" suggestion from Uematsu, who believed it would be impossible or too difficult. Upon being consulted, Kitase told the producer of the remaster to do anything Uematsu said, causing the change to be implemented. The singer was purposely chosen to sound more like a musical singer than an opera one, on account of Celes having been caught up in the performance. Uematsu stated that he was "overflowed with tears" upon hearing the final versions of the vocals, regardless of the language.

== Reception ==
Kirk Hamilton of Kotaku described the Opera House level as "awkward but charming", relying heavily on the player's imagination to fill in the gaps. Calling the level's narrative setup "far-fetched", he stated that it was nevertheless sold when the screen faded to black and a character began "singing" in MIDI. Despite having the immediate reaction to "crack up laughing", he nevertheless said that "when Celes walked to the edge of the tower and threw the flowers off the edge, I can't pretend I didn't feel something". Comparing the opera scene to similar musical interludes in Dragon Age: Inquisition and The Witcher 3, he noted that the Opera House's level of abstraction avoided the uncanny valley, causing him to never be "distracted by whether or not this was believable". However, he criticized the timed section in the level's latter portion as one of its worst aspects, as it would send the player back to the last save point if done incorrectly.

Chad Concelmo of Destructoid called the opera scene "a testament to the game's longevity and lasting impact", calling the background music during the Opera House sequence, as well as the cutscene, the "shining masterpiece" of Nobuo Uematsu. He described the level as a "perfect combination of video game music, unique gameplay, and exquisitely drawn sprites", though he said that it was hard to describe what made it great to those who did not play Final Fantasy VI. Claiming it was "easily one of the greatest video game moments of all time", he said that it would be remembered for years to come.

Zachary Ryan of IGN called the opera scene one of the most unforgettable moments in gaming, noting its importance to the narrative and unconventional usage of the game's mechanics, but ultimately calling it so important because it made the player feel. Stating that it was "one of the most believable and gut-punchingly real moments the medium had yet delivered", he described the scene as "love, loss and song all compressed into a 16-bit cartridge and relayed through your TV's crummy speakers". Joe Juba of Game Informer said that the industry still remembers the Opera House with "clarity and fondness", describing it as having laid the groundwork for more cinematic future Final Fantasy games. He noted that the scene eclipsed other parts of the game due to its sheer popularity. David Lozada of GameRevolution called the music during the scene "simplified musical notes", but expressed his opinion that the lines sung by Celes demonstrate a pivotal moment of character development, from being a "soulless weapon" to being able to express emotion and be truly human.

The 2015 video game Undertale parodies the opera scene with a performance from the robotic character Mettaton, during which the lyrics threaten the protagonist with impending death.
