= Stage weight =

Object used to stabilize items in a theater

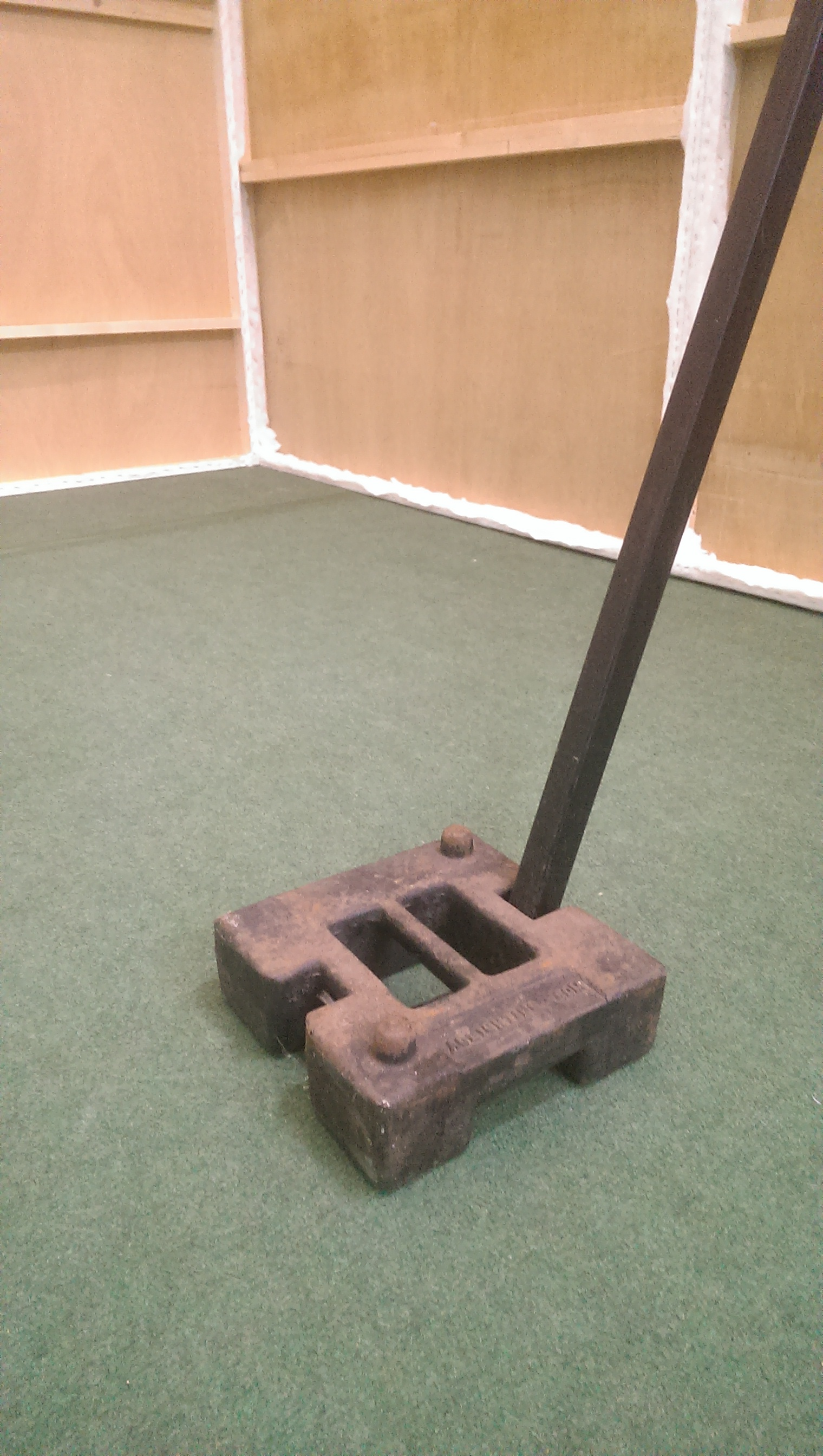
A 12.6-kilogram (28 lb) stage weight supporting a scenery brace.

A stage weight or brace weight is a heavy object used in a theater to provide stability to a brace supporting objects such as scenery or to stabilize items such as lighting stands. Ingot shaped stackable cast iron or cut steel weights are also used as counterweights of fly systems meant to hoist scenery away vertically when not in use. Such metal stage weights have largely replaced the older practice of using sandbag counterweights.
