= Yosumin! =

2007 video game

- Box art of the Japanese Nintendo DS release
- Developer: Square Enix
- Publisher: Square Enix
- Composer: Ryo Yamazaki
- Platforms: Microsoft Windows, Nintendo DS, Xbox Live Arcade
- Release: Nintendo DS: JP: November 8, 2007; Microsoft Windows: WW: May 26, 2009; Xbox 360: WW: May 27, 2009
- Genre: Puzzle video game
- Modes: Single-player, multiplayer

Yosumin! (よすみん。) is a puzzle video game released as a flash game for the personal computer. Later, it was ported to the Nintendo DS console and the Xbox 360. The game involves players manipulating a grid of "yosumin", or tiles to make color matches and eliminate a certain number before time runs out. Developed and published in Japan by Square Enix, the game was created to and brought to other platforms in an effort to expand their game portfolio and attract more casual players. The game has received mixed reviews, with some noting its originality and addictive gameplay, and others noting the game's limited nature.

== Gameplay ==
In Yosumin!, the player tries to select rectangular regions in a grid of tiles that have the same type of yosumin at all four corners. The player has a target goal of the number of rectangles with yosumin of specific types that must be removed, and has a time limit. The larger the rectangle selected, the greater the number of points the player receives. Special yosumin are sometimes included, which when removed can give extra time or points. Later in the game another type of yosumin is added which can be moved, allowing the player to create rectangles of larger size. In multiplayer mode, two players face off in a larger grid. Creating rectangles can remove time from the opponent's timer, and specific yosumin which are selected before the game begins perform other moves such as stunning the opposing player. Wireless two-player competitive mode is playable through game sharing on the Nintendo DS with a single cartridge. Enhancements included new block types such as a block that rearranges the boards layout.

== Development ==
Yosumin! was originally a free browser-based game. The game was showcased in playable form at the Tokyo Game Show 2007. It was shown to be an enhanced port of the original Yosumin browser game released by Square Enix on the @nifty network. This was confirmed to be part of publisher Square Enix's effort to expand their fan base internationally and across more types of players and genres, including more casual games. The game was available at Japanese Nintendo DS demo stations in November 2007. In November 2008 Square Enix trademarked Yosumin! In the United States. On January 26, 2009 Square Enix announced plans to release Yosumin! on the Xbox Live Arcade as part of an initiative to put more games on Xbox's games service. On May 26, 2009, Yosumin! was released over the digital distribution service Steam, and the following day was released on Xbox Live Arcade as Yosumin! Live.

== Reception ==
Reception

Aggregate score
Aggregator	Score
Metacritic	X360: 64/100

Review scores
Publication	Score
Famitsu	30 of 40
IGN	7.1 of 10

The Xbox Live Arcade version had minimal popularity, with fewer than 4,500 players on the game's leader-board. Gamasutra cited the Japanese name and a high price as reasons for the game's low popularity. IGN liked the PC version of the game, noting the loss of the Xbox Live Arcade multi-player but complimenting the expanded single player mode. UGO called the game its top sixth "Casual Games for Real Gamers", calling it fun and easy to learn.
