= Final Fantasy (video game) =

1987 video game

- North American cover art
- Developer: Square
- Publishers: Square; Nintendo (NES & GBA)
- Director: Hironobu Sakaguchi
- Producer: Masafumi Miyamoto
- Designers: Hiromichi Tanaka; Akitoshi Kawazu; Koichi Ishii
- Programmer: Nasir Gebelli
- Artists: Yoshitaka Amano; Kazuko Shibuya
- Writers: Hironobu Sakaguchi; Kenji Terada
- Composer: Nobuo Uematsu
- Series: Final Fantasy
- Platform: Nintendo Entertainment System: MSX2; WonderSwan Color; PlayStation; i-mode; EZweb; PlayStation Portable; iOS; J2ME; Windows Phone; Android; Nintendo 3DS; Windows; Nintendo Switch; PlayStation 4; Xbox Series X/S
- Release: December 18, 1987: Famicom/NES; JP: December 18, 1987; NA: July 1990; MSX2; JP: December, 1989; WonderSwan Color; JP: December 9, 2000; PlayStation; JP: October 31, 2002; i-mode; JP: March 1, 2004; EZweb; JP: August 19, 2004; Yahoo!; JP: July 3, 2006; PlayStation Portable; JP: April 19, 2007; NA: June 26, 2007; EU: February 8, 2008; AU: February 28, 2008; iOS; WW: February 25, 2010; J2ME; NA: March 15, 2010; UK: July 19, 2010; Windows Phone; WW: June 13, 2012; Android; WW: July 27, 2012; Nintendo 3DS; JP: January 21, 2015; Pixel Remaster; Android, iOS, Windows; WW: July 28, 2021; Nintendo Switch, PlayStation 4; WW: April 19, 2023 Xbox Series X/S; WW: September 26, 2024
- Genre: Role-playing
- Mode: Single-player

Final Fantasy (Note: Japanese: ファイナルファンタジー, Hepburn: Fainaru Fantajī) is a 1987 role-playing video game developed and published by Square for the Nintendo Entertainment System. It is the first game in Square's Final Fantasy series, created by Hironobu Sakaguchi. The story follows four youths called the Warriors of Light, who each carry one of their world's four elemental crystals which have been darkened by the four Elemental Fiends. Together, they quest to defeat these evil forces, restore light to the crystals, and save their world.

Final Fantasy was originally conceived under the working title Fighting Fantasy, but trademark issues and dire circumstances surrounding Square as well as Sakaguchi himself prompted the name to be changed. The game was a great commercial success, received generally positive reviews, and spawned many successful sequels and supplementary titles in the form of the Final Fantasy series.

Final Fantasy is now regarded as one of the most influential and successful role-playing games on the Nintendo Entertainment System, playing a major role in popularizing the genre. Critical praise focused on the game's graphics, while criticism targeted the amount of grinding. By March 2003, all versions of Final Fantasy had sold a combined two million copies worldwide.

== Gameplay ==
Final Fantasy has four basic game modes: an overworld map, town and dungeon maps, a battle screen, and a menu screen. The overworld map is a scaled-down version of the game's fictional world, which the player uses to direct characters to various locations. The primary means of travel across the overworld is by foot; a ship, a canoe, and an airship become available as the player progresses. With the exception of some battles in preset locations or with bosses, enemies are randomly encountered on field maps and on the overworld map when traveling by foot, canoe, or ship, and must either be fought or fled from.

The Light Warriors (dead) battle Lich, Fiend of Earth

The game's plot develops as the player progresses through towns and dungeons. Some town citizens offer helpful information, while others own shops that sell items or equipment. Dungeons appear in areas that include forests, caves, mountains, swamps, underwater caverns, and buildings. Dungeons often have treasure chests containing rare items that are not available in most stores. The game's menu screen allows the player to keep track of their experience points and levels, to choose which equipment their characters wield, and to use items and magic. A character's most basic attribute is their level, which can range from one to fifty, and is determined by the character's amount of experience. Gaining a level increases the character's attributes, such as their maximum hit points (HP), which represents a character's remaining health; a character dies when they reach zero HP. Characters gain experience points by winning battles.

Combat in Final Fantasy is menu-based: the player selects an action from a list of options such as Attack, Magic, and Item. Battles are turn-based and continue until either side flees or is defeated. If the player's party wins, each character will gain not only experience but also money, which is known as Gil in the Final Fantasy universe; if it flees, it will be returned to the map screen; and if every character in the party dies, the game will be over and all unsaved progress will be lost. Final Fantasy was the first game to show the player's characters on the right side of the screen and the enemies on the left side of the screen, as opposed to a first-person view.

The player begins the game by choosing four characters to form a party and is locked into that choice for the duration of the game. Each character has an "occupation", or character class, with different attributes and abilities that are either innate or can be acquired. There are six classes: Fighter, Thief, Black Belt, Red Mage, White Mage, and Black Mage. Later in the game, the player has the option to have each character undergo a "class upgrade"; whereby their sprite portraits mature, and some classes gain the ability to use weapons and magic that they previously could not use. The game contains a variety of weapons, armor, and items that can be bought or found to make the characters more powerful in combat. Each character has eight inventory slots, with four to hold weapons and four to hold armor. Each character class has restrictions on what weapons and armor it may use. Some weapons and armor are magical; if used during combat, they will cast spells. Other magical artifacts provide protection, such as from certain spells. At shops, the characters can buy items to help themselves recover while they are traveling. Items available include potions, which heal the characters or remove ailments like poison or petrification; Tents and Cabins, which can be used on the world map to heal the player and optionally save the game; and Houses, which also recover the party's magic after saving. Special items may be gained by doing quests.

Magic is a common ability in the game, and several character classes use it. Spells are divided into two groups: White, which is defensive and healing, and Black, which is debilitating and destructive. Magic can be bought from White and Black magic shops and assigned to characters whose occupation allows them to use it. Spells are classified by a level between one and eight, with four White and four Black spells per level. Each character may learn only three spells per level. White and Black Mages can potentially learn any of their respective spells, while Red Mages, the Ninja, and the Knight cannot use most high-level magic.

== Plot ==
=== Setting ===
Final Fantasy takes place in a fantasy world with three large continents. The elemental powers of this world are determined by the state of four crystals, each governing one of the four classical elements: earth, fire, water, and wind. The world of Final Fantasy is inhabited by numerous races, including humans, elves, dwarves, mermaids, dragons, and robots. Most non-human races have only one "town" in the game, although non-human individuals are sometimes found in human towns or other areas as well. Four hundred years prior to the start of the game, the Lefeinish people, who used the Power of Wind to craft airships and a giant space station (called the Floating Castle in the game), watched their country decline as the Wind crystal went dark. Two hundred years later, violent storms sank a massive shrine that served as the center of an ocean-based civilization, and the Water crystal went dark. The Earth crystal and the Fire crystal followed, plaguing the earth with raging wildfires, and devastating the agricultural town of Melmond as the plains and vegetation decayed. Some time later, the sage Lukahn tells of a prophecy that four Light Warriors will come to save the world in a time of darkness.

=== Story ===
The game begins with the appearance of the four youthful Warriors of Light, the heroes of the story, who each carry one of the darkened crystals. Initially, the Warriors of Light have access to the Kingdom of Coneria and the ruined Temple of Chaos. After the Warriors rescue Princess Sarah from the evil knight Garland, the King of Coneria builds a bridge that enables the Warriors of Light passage east to the town of Pravoka.

There the Warriors of Light liberate the town from Bikke and his band of pirates and acquire the pirates' ship for their own use. The Warriors now embark on a chain of delivery quests on the shores of the Aldi Sea. First, they retrieve a stolen crown from the Marsh Cave for a king in a ruined castle, who turns out to be the dark elf Astos. Defeating him gains them the Crystal Eye, which they return to the blind witch Matoya in exchange for a herb needed to awaken the elf prince cursed by Astos.

The elf prince gives the Warriors of Light the Mystic Key, which is capable of unlocking any door. The key unlocks a storage room in Coneria Castle which holds TNT. Nerrick, one of the dwarves of the Cave of Dwarf/Dwarf Village, destroys a small isthmus using the TNT, connecting the Aldi Sea to the outside world. After visiting the near-ruined town of Melmond, the Warriors of Light go to the Earth Cave to defeat a vampire and retrieve the Star Ruby, which gains passage to Sage Sarda's cave. With Sarda's Rod, the Warriors venture deeper into the Earth Cave and destroy the Earth Fiend, Lich. The Warriors of Light then obtain a canoe and enter Gurgu Volcano and defeat the Fire Fiend, Kary. The Levistone from the nearby Ice Cave allows them to raise an airship to reach the northern continents.

A kind gesture is repaid by a fairy, receiving special liquid that produces oxygen, and the Warriors use it to help defeat the Water Fiend, Kraken, in the Sunken Shrine. They also recover a Slab, which allows a linguist named Dr. Unne to teach them the Lefeinish language. The Lefeinish give the Warriors of Light access to the Floating Castle that Tiamat, the Wind Fiend, has taken over. With the Four Fiends defeated and the crystals restored, the Warriors open a portal in the Temple of Chaos, which takes them 2000 years into the past, to confront the creator of the Fiends. There the Warriors discover that the Four Fiends sent Garland—now the archdemon Chaos—back in time and he sent the Fiends to the future to do so, creating a time loop by which he could live forever. The Warriors of Light defeat Chaos, thus ending the loop, and return to present, but their heroic deeds remain unknown outside of legend.

== Development ==
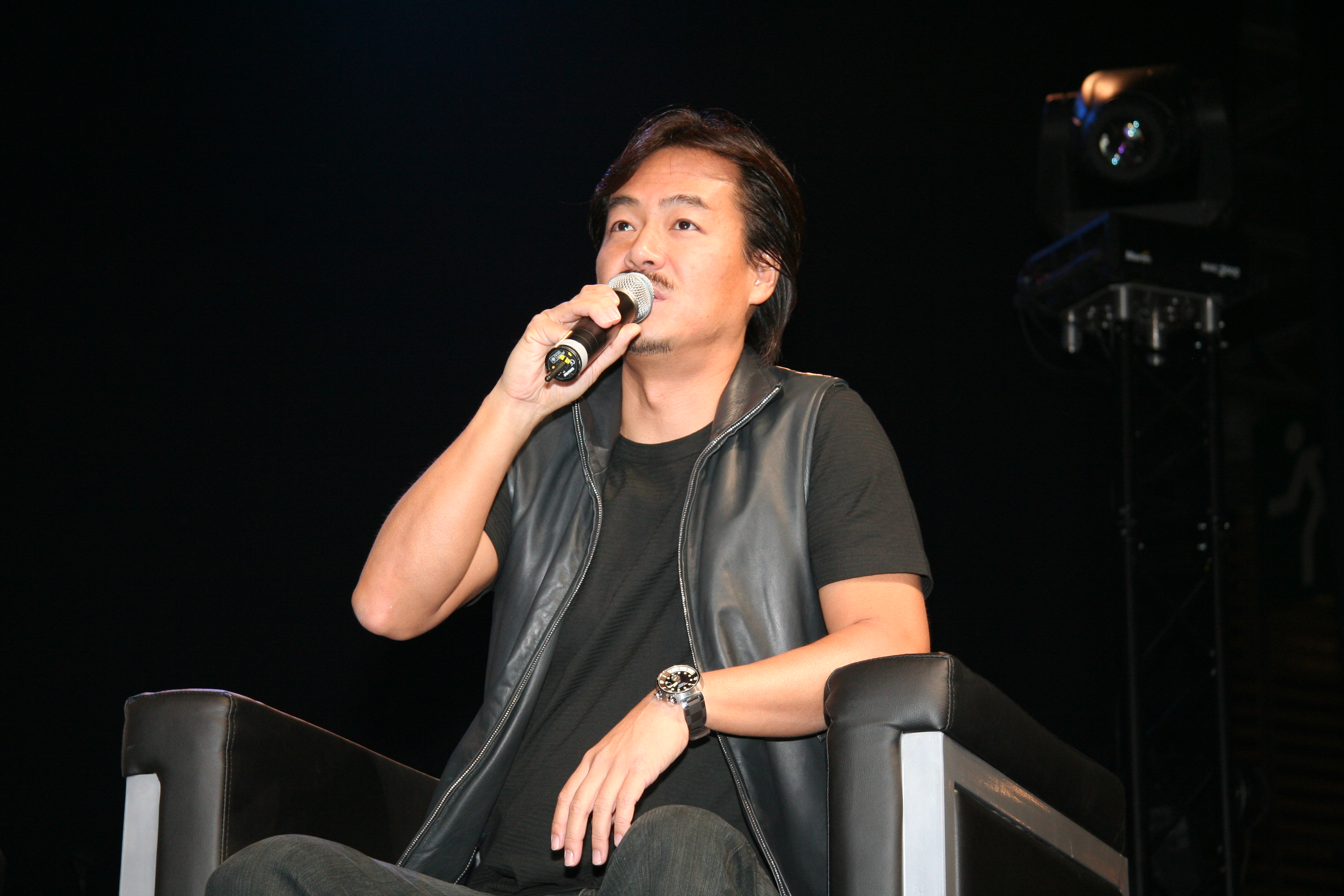
Hironobu Sakaguchi at Japan Expo Paris in 2007

=== Creation ===
Hironobu Sakaguchi had intended to make a role-playing game (RPG) for a long time, but his employer Square refused to give him permission as it expected low sales of such a product. However, when the RPG Dragon Quest was released and proved to be a hit in Japan, the company reconsidered its stance on the genre and approved Sakaguchi's vision of an RPG inspired by Ultima and Wizardry. Only three of his colleagues volunteered to join this project headed by him because he was thought of as a "rough boss" in spite of his unsuccessful creations. Eventually, Final Fantasy was developed by a team of seven core staff members within Square referred to as the "A-Team". Sakaguchi convinced fellow game designers Koichi Ishii and Akitoshi Kawazu to join the project. Kawazu was mainly responsible for the battle system and sequences, which he based heavily on the tabletop game Dungeons & Dragons and the RPG Wizardry. For example, enemies' weaknesses to elements such as fire and ice had not been included in Japanese RPGs up until that point. Kawazu had grown fond of such aspects of Western RPGs and decided to incorporate them into Final Fantasy. He also advocated the player's option to freely choose their own party member classes at the beginning of the game as he felt that the fun in an RPG began when the players created their character.

The scenario was written by freelance writer Kenji Terada, based on a story by Sakaguchi. Ishii heavily influenced the game's setting with his idea of the crystals. He also suggested illustrator Yoshitaka Amano as character designer, but Sakaguchi declined at first as he had never heard the artist's name before. When Sakaguchi showed Ishii some drawings on magazine clippings and told him that this was the art style he was looking for, Ishii revealed to him that these were actually created by Amano, hence leading to his involvement in the game. The music for Final Fantasy was composed by Nobuo Uematsu and marked his 16th video game music composition. Iranian-American programmer Nasir Gebelli was hired to code the game. He initially tried to understand all aspects of the gameplay but was soon advised by Sakaguchi to just program the design concepts so he did not have to explain everything to Gebelli in detail. Gebelli was also responsible for creating what is considered to be the first RPG minigame, a sliding puzzle, which he added into the game despite it not being part of the original game design. Among the other developers were graphic designer Kazuko Shibuya, programmers Kiyoshi Yoshii and Ken Narita, as well as debugger Hiroyuki Ito. When the project started to show promise, designer Hiromichi Tanaka and his "B-Team" joined to aid development. The lack of faith in Sakaguchi's team, as well as its unpopularity within the company, motivated the staff members to give their best.

=== Release ===
Sakaguchi took an in-development ROM of the game to Japanese magazine Famicom Tsushin, but it would not review it. However, Famitsu gave the game extensive coverage. Initially, only 200,000 copies were to be shipped, but Sakaguchi pleaded with the company to make 400,000 to help spawn a sequel, and the management agreed, then the original Famicom (NES) version successfully shipped 520,000 copies in Japan. Following the successful North American localization of Dragon Quest (titled as Dragon Warrior when localized there), Nintendo of America translated Final Fantasy into English and published it in North America in 1990. No version of the game was marketed in the PAL region until Final Fantasy Origins in 2003.

=== Title ===
Over the years, several theories emerged as to why the game was called Final Fantasy. In 2015, Sakaguchi revealed that, from the beginning, the team had wished for a name that could be shortened to FF (エフエフ, efu efu); that way, the game's title could be abbreviated in the Latin script and pronounced in four syllables in the Japanese language. The original working title for Sakaguchi's RPG concept was Fighting Fantasy, but was changed to avoid issues with a gamebook series of the same name that had already been released. The reason for choosing the word "final" to form the eventual title of Final Fantasy was explained as twofold by Uematsu: for one thing, it stemmed from Sakaguchi's personal situation, as he would have quit the game industry and gone back to university had the game not sold well, and for another, Square was under the threat of bankruptcy at the time, which meant the game could have been the company's last. Although Sakaguchi confirmed some of the theories, he later downplayed the rationale for choosing the word "final", saying that "it was definitely a back-to-the-wall type situation back then, but any word that starts with an 'F' would have been fine".

== Versions and re-releases ==
Final Fantasy has been remade several times for different platforms and has frequently been packaged with Final Fantasy II in various collections. While all of these remakes retain the same story and battle mechanics, various changes have been made in different areas, including graphics, sound, and specific game elements.

Chronology of Final Fantasy versions and remakes
Title	Release	Country	System	Developer	Publisher	Notes
Final Fantasy	1987; 1990	Japan; USA	Family Computer / Nintendo Entertainment System	Square	Square; Nintendo (NES)	The original version. Technical limitations and the censorship policies of Nintendo of America resulted in a few minor changes to certain elements of the American version.
Final Fantasy	1989	Japan	MSX2	Square	Microcabin	Minor graphical upgrades, expanded music and sound effects, and shorter loading times.
Final Fantasy I・II	1994	Japan	Family Computer	Square	Square	Minor graphical updates, as well as a single type fix.
Final Fantasy	2000	Japan	WonderSwan Color	Square	Square	All-new, more detailed graphics, background images in battle scenes, re-drawn sprites, and parity with later games.
Final Fantasy Origins	2002; 2003; 2003	Japan; USA; EUR	PlayStation	Tose	Square; Square Enix (re-releases); Infogrames (Europe)	Includes the same graphics from the WonderSwan Color version, remixed soundtrack, FMV sequences, art galleries, and memo save function.
Final Fantasy I & II: Dawn of Souls	2004	Japan; USA; EUR	Game Boy Advance	Tose	Nintendo	Four additional dungeons, updated bestiary, and a few minor changes.
Final Fantasy	2004; 2006; 2010	Japan; Japan; USA	Mobile phone		Square Enix; Bandai Namco Games	
Final Fantasy	2007; 2007; 2008	Japan; USA; EUR	PlayStation Portable	Tose	Square Enix	Higher-resolution 2D graphics, FMV sequences, remixed soundtrack, bonus dungeon, and additional content from Dawn of Souls.
Final Fantasy	2009; 2009; 2010	Japan; USA; EUR	Wii Virtual Console		Square Enix	Virtual Console release of the original FC / NES version.
Final Fantasy	2009; 2012	Japan; USA	PlayStation Store PSOne Classics	Square		Release of the PlayStation version as a PSOne Classic.
Final Fantasy	2010	worldwide	iOS	Square Enix	Square Enix	Based on the PSP version.
Final Fantasy	2011	Japan; EUR	PlayStation Store downloadable PSP games	Square Enix		PlayStation Portable version released as downloadable PSP game.
Final Fantasy	2012	worldwide	Windows Phone		Square Enix	Based on the iOS version.
Final Fantasy	2012	worldwide	Android	Square Enix	Square Enix	Based on the iOS version, but without the bonus dungeons, bestiary, and music player.
Final Fantasy	2013	Japan	Nintendo 3DS Virtual Console	Square	Square Enix	Virtual Console release of the original FC version.
Final Fantasy	2013	Japan	Wii U Virtual Console	Square	Square Enix	Virtual Console release of the original FC version.
Final Fantasy	2015	Japan	Nintendo 3DS	Square Enix	Square Enix	Based on the PSP version with updated 3D stereoscopic graphics.
Final Fantasy I & II Advance	2016	Japan	Wii U Virtual Console	Square	Square Enix	Virtual Console release of the GBA version.
Final Fantasy	2016	USA; EUR	NES Classic Edition	Square	Square Enix; Nintendo	The original version emulated as an in-built title for the system.
Final Fantasy Pixel Remaster	2021, 2023, 2024	worldwide	Android iOS; Windows (via Steam); Nintendo Switch; PlayStation 4, Xbox Series X/S	Square Enix	Square Enix	2D remaster based on the original game.

Final Fantasy was first re-released for the MSX2 system and was published by Microcabin in Japan in December 1989. It had access to almost three times as much storage space as the Famicom version but suffered from problems not present in Nintendo's cartridge media, including noticeable loading times. There were also minor graphical upgrades, improved music tracks, and sound effects.

In 1994, Final Fantasy I・II, a compilation of Final Fantasy and Final Fantasy II, was launched for the Famicom. This version was only released in Japan and had very few graphical updates.

The WonderSwan Color remake was released in Japan on December 9, 2000, and featured many new graphical changes. The 8-bit graphics of the original Famicom game were updated, battle scenes incorporated full background images, and character and enemy sprites were redrawn to look more like the ones from the Super Famicom Final Fantasy games.

In Japan, Final Fantasy and Final Fantasy II were re-released both separately and as a combined game for the PlayStation. The collection was released in Japan in 2002 as Final Fantasy I & II Premium Package and in Europe and North America in 2003 as Final Fantasy Origins. This version was similar to the WonderSwan Color remake and featured several changes such as more detailed graphics, a remixed soundtrack, added full motion video sequences, art galleries of Yoshitaka Amano's illustrations, and a memo save function. The port was re-released as part of the Final Fantasy 25th Anniversary Ultimate Box package in December 2012.

Final Fantasy I & II: Dawn of Souls is, like Final Fantasy Origins, a port of the first two games in the series and was released for the Game Boy Advance in 2004. The Dawn of Souls version incorporates various new elements, including four additional dungeons, an updated bestiary, and a few minor changes.

Square Enix released a version of Final Fantasy for two Japanese mobile phone networks in 2004; a version for NTT DoCoMo FOMA 900i series was launched in March under the title Final Fantasy i and a subsequent release for CDMA 1X WIN-compatible phones was launched in August. Another version was released for SoftBank Yahoo! Keitai phones on July 3, 2006. The games have more refined graphics compared to the original 8-bit game, but not as advanced as many of the later console and handheld ports.

Square Enix planned to release this version for North American mobile phones in 2006, but it was delayed to 2010 and released in collaboration with Namco. It retains the game difficulty and "spell level"-based magic system from the original Famicom version. Other elements such as updated graphics, spell names, and monster names are borrowed from the Game Boy Advance / WonderSwan Color versions, not including the additional dungeons, monsters and items present in the GBA version. Game data is saved as in the original Famicom version (by using Tent, Sleeping Bag, and Cottage or by going into an inn), but there are now three save game slots and a "Temporary Save" option available in the game.

For the 20th anniversary of Final Fantasy, Square Enix remade Final Fantasy and Final Fantasy II for the PlayStation Portable. The games were released in Japan and North America in 2007, and in European territories in 2008. The PSP version features higher-resolution 2D graphics, full motion video sequences, a remixed soundtrack, and a new dungeon as well as the bonus dungeons from Dawn of Souls. The script is the same as in the Dawn of Souls version, aside from the new dungeon. This version was later released for the Nintendo 3DS (on the Japanese eShop only) with the addition of stereoscopic 3D.

Square Enix released the original NES version of the game on the Wii's Virtual Console service in Japan on May 26, 2009, in North America on October 5 and in the PAL region as an import on May 7, 2010.

Square Enix released the iOS version of Final Fantasy on February 25, 2010, based on the PSP port with touch controls, worldwide. A Windows Phone version was released on June 13, 2012, which is based on the iOS version. Square Enix released Android port on July 27, 2012, largely based on the iOS version though lacking the new dungeons of the 20th-anniversary edition.

The game (alongside 29 other games) was included in the NES Classic Edition / Nintendo Classic Mini: Nintendo Entertainment System released by Nintendo in November 2016.

The first game in the Pixel Remaster series, Final Fantasy, alongside Final Fantasy II and III, was released on iOS, Android, and Windows PC through Steam on July 28, 2021. This enhanced version was released as part of the Final Fantasy Pixel Remaster compilation series for Nintendo Switch and PlayStation 4 in 2023, and for Xbox Series X/S in 2024.

== Reception ==
Reception

Aggregate scores
Aggregator	Score
GameRankings	NES (retrospective): 81% PSP: 68%
Metacritic	PSP: 67/100 iOS: 74/100; PC: 80/100

Review scores
Publication	Score
Famitsu	Famicom: 34/40; WonderSwan: 30/40
GameSpot	PSP: 6.5/10
IGN	WonderSwan: 8.6/10; PSP: 6.9/10 iOS: 7 / 10
TouchArcade	iOS: 4/5 iOS (Pixel Remaster): 4/5
GamePlay RPG	WonderSwan: 96%

Final Fantasy has been well received by critics and commercially successful; the original Famicom (NES) version shipped 520,000 copies in Japan, grossing more than ¥3 billion or $21,000,000 (equivalent to $60,000,000 in 2025) at retail. By 1994, the game had sold 600,000 copies in Japan according to Square. The NES release was more successful in North America, where it sold 700,000 copies, adding up to 1.3 million copies sold worldwide by 1994. As of March 2003, the game, including all re-releases and remakes at the time, had shipped 1.99 million copies worldwide, with 1.21 million of those copies being shipped in Japan and 780,000 abroad. As of November 2007, another PlayStation Portable version shipped 140,000 copies.

Editors at IGN ranked Final Fantasy the 11th best game on the NES, calling the game's class system diverse, and praising its convenient use of vehicles as a means of traveling across the world map. GamesRadar ranked it the eighth best NES game ever made. The staff felt that while Dragon Warrior introduced gamers to the genre, Final Fantasy popularized it. In 2004, readers of Retro Gamer voted Final Fantasy 93rd top retro game, with the staff noting that "despite poor visuals and a relatively simple quest, many still consider the original to be the best (with the exception of FFVII)". In 2006, Final Fantasy appeared in the Japanese magazine Famitsu's Top 100 games list, where readers voted it the 63rd best game of all time. GameFAQs users made a similar list in 2005, which ranked Final Fantasy at 76th. It was rated the 49th best game made on a Nintendo system in Nintendo Power's Top 200 Games list. In 2008, Nintendo Power ranked it the 19th best Nintendo Entertainment System video game, praising it for setting up the basics of console role-playing games, along with Dragon Warrior, and citing examples such as epic stories, leveling up, random battles, and character classes. In 2023, Time Extension included the game on their "Best JRPGs of All Time" list, also noting it as one of the best and influential NES games.

Final Fantasy was one of the most influential early console role-playing games and played a major role in legitimizing and popularizing the genre. According to IGN's Matt Casamassina, Final Fantasy's storyline had a deeper and more engaging story than the original Dragon Quest (known as Dragon Warrior in North America). Modern critics have criticized the game for being poorly paced by contemporary standards, as it involves much more time wandering in search of random battle encounters to raise their experience levels and money than it does exploring and solving puzzles. Other reviewers find the level-building and exploration portions of the game as the most entertaining. In 1987, Famitsu initially described the original Final Fantasy as "one of many" that imitated the Dragon Quest formula. Roe R. Adams, III reviewed the game for Computer Gaming World, and stated that gamers should "put Final Fantasy high on your list of games to recommend to people who have no idea what a CRPG is or how to play one". The game is considered by some to be the weakest and most difficult installment of the series.

The subsequent versions of Final Fantasy have garnered mostly favorable reviews from the media. Peer Schneider of IGN enjoyed the WonderSwan Color version, praising its graphical improvements, especially the environments, characters, and monsters. Famitsu scored this version a 30 out of 40. The PlayStation Portable version was not as critically successful as the previous releases; GameSpot's Kevin VanOrd cited the visuals as its strongest enhancement but stated that the additional random enemy encounters and updated graphics did not add much value.

== Legacy ==
A soundtrack album was released together with the score of Final Fantasy II in 1989. Some of the game's tracks became mainstays to the Final Fantasy series: the "Prelude", the arpeggio played on the title screen; the "Opening Theme", which is played when the party crosses the bridge early in the game and later referred to as the Final Fantasy theme; and the "Victory Fanfare", which is played after every victorious battle. The opening motif of the battle theme has also been reused a number of times in the series. Final Fantasy was also the basis for the series finale of a video game-themed cartoon series Captain N: The Game Master entitled "The Fractured Fantasy of Captain N". 8-Bit Theater, a sprite-based webcomic created by Brian Clevinger, parodies the game, and has become very popular in the gaming community since it started in March 2001.

Elements from the video game have also appeared in a series of fighting games: Dissidia Final Fantasy, Dissidia 012 and Dissidia NT. Warrior of Light, based on Yoshitaka Amano's design of the lead character, and Garland are the respective hero and villain representing Final Fantasy. Warrior of Light is voiced by Toshihiko Seki in the Japanese version and Grant George in the English version, while Garland is voiced by Kenji Utsumi (Dissidia Final Fantasy and Dissidia 012) and Kōji Ishii (Dissidia NT) in the Japanese versions and Christopher Sabat in the English versions. All the games add background information to the world of Final Fantasy. For instance, Dissidia 012 Final Fantasy names the world of Final Fantasy "World A" in order to distinguish it from World B, the world of Dissidia. Characters and music from Final Fantasy have also appeared in the Theatrhythm Final Fantasy series. Chaos and the Amano Warrior of Light make appearances as bosses in the Stormblood and Shadowbringers expansions of Final Fantasy XIV, respectively.

Stranger of Paradise: Final Fantasy Origin, an alternate universe prequel to the original Final Fantasy, contains numerous references and allusions to the original game, in addition acting as an "origin story" of the antagonist Chaos and the four Warriors of Light.

== See also ==
- List of Square Enix video game franchises
