= Masafumi Miyamoto =

Japanese businessman (born 1957)

- Born: 1957 (age 68–69); Japan
- Education: Waseda University
- Occupations: Investor, businessman

Masafumi Miyamoto (宮本 雅史, Miyamoto Masafumi, born 1957) is a Japanese investor and businessman who founded the video game company Square. Miyamoto served as president of Square until 1991.

== Biography ==
Miyamoto graduated from Waseda University in 1983, and began his professional career in the software division of Den-Yu-Sha, a company owned by his father, where he developed computer games. Miyamoto had teams of graphic designers, programmers, and professional writers working on game projects together. Miyamoto recruited game developers demonstrated sufficient programming skills in a building similar to what would be known as internet cafes. In 1986, Miyamoto spun Square out from Den-Yu-Sha to become an independent company with a focus on making games for the Famicom video game system. He stepped down as president of Square in 1991.

== Square Enix merger ==
During the discussion of the merger of Square and Enix in 2002, his approval of the merger was essential because of his major stake in Square. Initially, the proposed share ratio was 1 Square share to 0.81 Enix shares, a proposal that Miyamoto opposed. When the merger went through, 1 share of Square resulted in 0.85 shares of Enix. Miyamoto made 5 million shares, or 9% of the company, available for purchase in the summer of 2002 but still retained 31.04% ownership. As of March 31, 2018, he is the tenth-largest shareholder of Square Enix. Since the beginning of 2025, Square Enix has been targeted, which has led to an increase in the company's share price.
