= Microsoft Game Studios Japan =

Japanese video game developer

Microsoft Development Japan Co., Ltd.

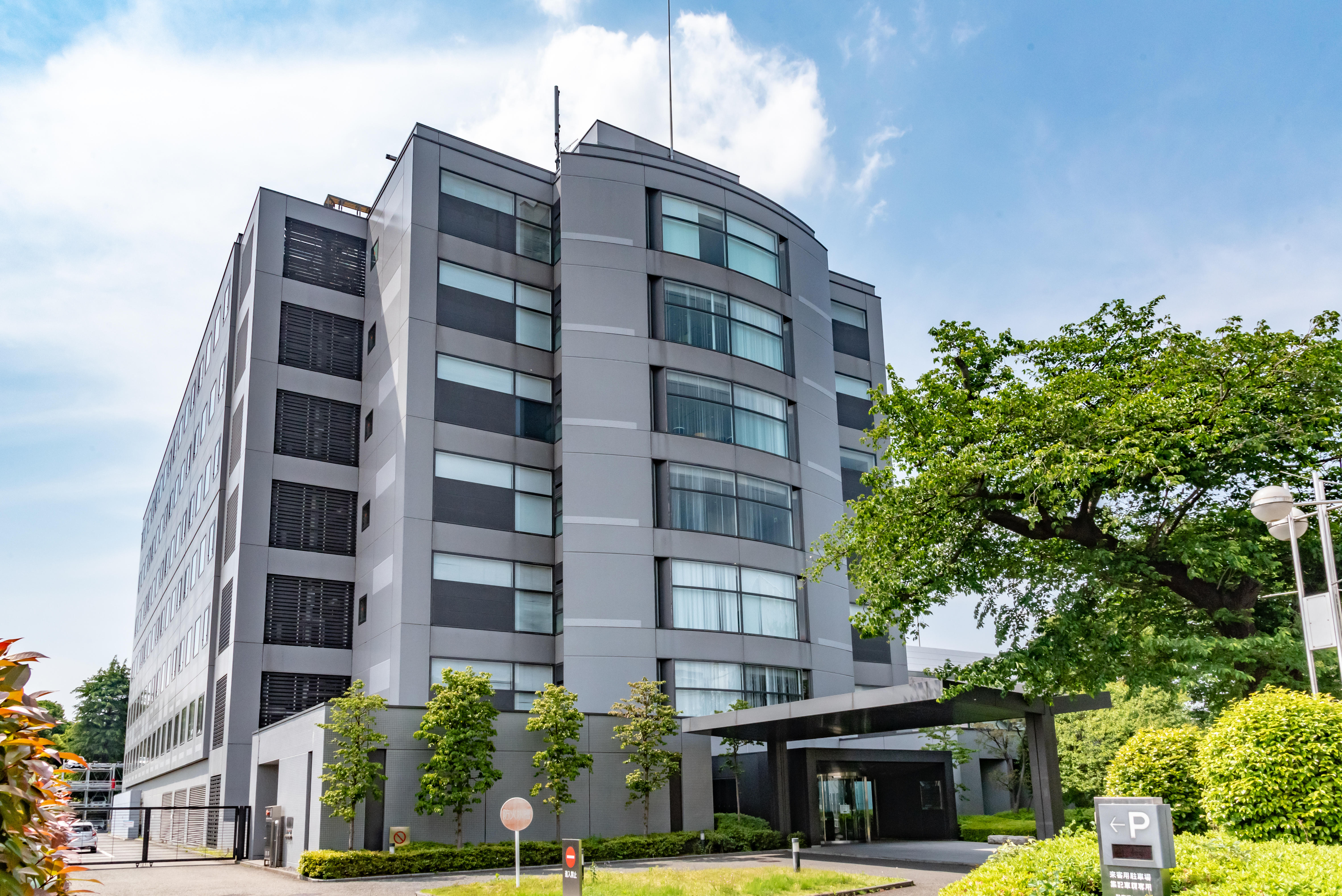
- Former headquarters in Chōfu, Tokyo
- Trade name: Microsoft Game Studios Japan
- Native name: マイクロソフト開発ジャパン株式会社
- Romanized name: Kabushiki-gaisha Maikurosofuto kaihatsu Japan (K.K. Microsoft Development)
- Formerly: Microsoft Development Company Co., Ltd. (2005–2012)
- Type: Division
- Industry: Video games
- Predecessors: Xbox Japan Division; Xbox Games Production Group
- Founded: November 16, 2005; 21 years ago
- Founders: Hirohisa Oura; Toshiyuki Miyata
- Defunct: November 28, 2014; 11 years ago
- Fate: Merged and folded into Xbox Japan headquarters in Minato and other studios
- Successor: Xbox Japan
- Headquarters: Chōfu, Tokyo, Japan
- Key people: Takashi Sensui (general manager)
- Number of employees: 220 (2011)
- Parent: Microsoft Studios

Microsoft Development Japan Co., Ltd., (Note: Japanese: マイクロソフト開発ジャパン株式会社, Hepburn: Maikurosofuto kaihatsu Japan kabushiki-gaisha) trading as Microsoft Game Studios Japan, (Note: Japanese: マイクロソフトゲームスタジオジャパン, Hepburn: Maikurosofutogēmusutajiojapan) (MGSJ) was a Japanese video game developer based in Chōfu, Tokyo. It was established in November 2005 following the merger between Microsoft Game Studios' Xbox Japanese division and research and development division Xbox Games Production Group. The division focused on developing and producing video games, apps, and other related entertainment software for the Xbox consoles. After Microsoft's layoffs in July 2014, the division was slowly reduced before its closure in November 2014 after general manager Takashi Sensui moves to the US-based Microsoft Studios headquarters.

== History ==
=== Xbox Japan Division and Xbox Games Production Group founding, and first projects (2001–2004) ===
Following the unveiling of the Xbox by Microsoft at the Consumer Electronics Show (CES) in Las Vegas in January 2001 and the establishment of the American division Microsoft Game Studios, Bill Gates announced the formation of Xbox's Japanese division at the Tokyo Game Show (TGS) 2001 on March 30, 2001, responsible for managing second-party and third-party developers relationships with Japanese game companies, and for managing supervision, operations, development support, and research and development for Xbox in Japan. The division is headed by Hirohisa Ousa, who reported to Microsoft's president of Entertainment & Devices Division engineering group Robbie Bach. Additionally, Gates announced that Xbox Japan division will houses the Xbox Games Production Group (XGPG), Microsoft's newly formed game developer focused in create video games for the Xbox console. The Games Production Group was established by former Sony Computer Entertainment Inc. (SCEI) Development Department manager Toshiyuki Miyata, and during TGS, Miyata unveiled a long-term, strategic partnership between MGSJ with Sega, who premiered Jet Set Radio Future, Panzer Dragoon Orta, Gunvalkyrie, and Sega GT 2002. The games will have supervision and development support by Xbox Games Production Group and will feature exclusively for the Xbox console.

The first project developed by Xbox Games Production Group was the Xbox port of Shenmue II, announced in October 2001 to be in development in partnership with Sega and its newly founded SEGA-AM2 division. The game was released for North America and Europe in October 2002, where Microsoft Game Studios secured console exclusivity for marketing and distribution and it was the first Xbox Games Production Group title to have the Microsoft Game Studios Japan brand in it. Shortly after, Microsoft Game Studios released its second project in November 2002, the fighting game Kakuto Chojin: Back Alley Brutal, previously announced as Project K-X at TGS. The game was co-developed with Dream Publishing, a studio created by members of DreamFactory and MGSJ. To help the launch of Xbox in Japan, the Japan Division increased its size and partnered with studios around Japan to bring exclusive content for the platform, including co-develop Sneakers with Media.Vision and Blinx: The Time Sweeper with Artoon, both projects created with the mascot-title appeal for the Japanese public. Xbox Japan also partnered with Tomonobu Itagaki and Tecmo's Team Ninja and brought Dead or Alive 3 for the launch of Xbox console. Sega and its Hitmaker division released Crazy Taxi 3: High Roller on the window launch of the console after Crazy Taxi Next project with MGSJ was rebooted.

By the end of 2002, Microsoft Game Studios Japan in partnership with FromSoftware and Sega released Otogi: Myth of Demons. The game received position reception and sales and was followed by a sequel, Otogi 2: Immortal Warriors, in December 2003. In January 2003, Hirohisa Oura was transferred from Xbox Japan Division to the US Microsoft Game Studios headquarters and by March 2003, Microsoft laid off 34 employees in the Xbox Japan division, which included the Xbox Games Production Group head Toshiyuki Miyata. At the time, Microsoft Game Studios Japan staff consisted of approximately 200 employees. The internal restructuring of the division was completed in June, with Par Singh taking over the leadership of both the Xbox Japan division and MGSJ, reporting to Microsoft Japan's vice president, Michael Rawding. Microsoft Game Studios Japan collaborated with Red Entertainment and released N.U.D.E.@ Natural Ultimate Digital Experiment in April 2003 exclusively in Japan. In September, Microsoft Japan unveiled Magatama, an action game developed by Team Breakout, a small team within Microsoft Game Studios Japan, released exclusively in Japan in November 2003. Yoshihiro Maruyama, then COO of SquareSoft, was named President of Xbox Japan & Games Production Group at the end of 2003, reporting directly to the newly Corporate Vice-president & Head of Marketing and Worldwide Sales at MGS, Peter Moore, while Singh will take as Director of Advanced Planning in Europe and Japan at MGS.

=== Microsoft Development Japan establishment and transition to Xbox 360 (2004–2009) ===
Aspiring to work with big Japanese creators and studios, Microsoft Game Studios Japan approached video game producers Akihiro Hino, Yukio Futatsugi, and Hironobu Sakaguchi to draw concepts for future Xbox games. Hino and MGSJ discussed concept ideas that resulted in the development of True Fantasy Live Online, an MMORPG developed in partnership with Level-5 and aiming to rival PlayStation 2's Final Fantasy XI. The game was officially announced at E3 2003, with an initial release date planned for late that year. Futatsugi joined Microsoft shortly after left Japan Studio, and internally formed a team within MGSJ who contributed to the development of Magatama, before successfully pitching the idea for Phantom Dust, revealed at 2003's Tokyo Game Show. After leaving Square in 2003, Sakaguchi and Microsoft discussed a number of ideas, which quickly became the first drafts of Lost Odyssey. Following the success of Dead or Alive 3, which revitalized the series, Itagaki and Tecmo's Team Ninja decided to continue its strategic partnership with Microsoft Game Studios Japan, resulting in the reboot of the Ninja Gaiden series released in 2004, who achieved critical acclaim and spawned multiple sequels. Dead or Alive Ultimate, a remastered compilation of Dead or Alive 1 and 2, was also released in 2004.

MGSJ decided to postpone True Fantasy Live Online until late 2004 due to further restructuring within the division and recentralization of internal projects, including Level-5's inexperience with online network coding, ultimately leading to its cancellation in June 2004. This also led to several delays in the development of Lost Odyssey, which went from being an internal project of Microsoft Game Studios Japan, with Sakaguchi leaving Xbox Japan to establish Mistwalker to continue development of the game, which had foundation funding and a minority stake from MGSJ. During its transition, Artoon and Microsoft Japan released Blinx 2: Masters of Time and Space in November 2004, a sequel to the original game released in 2002, aiming to build a Japanese-mascot for the Xbox brand.

In 2005, Microsoft Japan and its divisions searched publishers and studios to support its new console, the Xbox 360. At the time, MGSJ was already working in multiple projects, both internally and externally development support, including Every Party with Game Republic for the console launch in Japan, and Ninety-Nine Nights with Q Entertainment and Phantagram in the console's launch window. MGSJ and Tecmo also released Dead or Alive 4 ahead of the launch of Xbox 360.

In February 2005, Microsoft Game Studios Japan announced Sakaguchi was joining the company to work on multiple games for the new Xbox 360. Around the same time in May 2005, Microsoft established Microsoft Development Japan in Chōfu, Tokyo, merging the Xbox's Japan division and the Microsoft Game Studios Japan unit in it, with Yukio Futatsugi being point as General Manager of Design and Head of the Games Unit of the new division, overseeing projects for the Xbox 360 and judging whether certain titles were suitable for release in Japan. The Microsoft Development shortly grow, by expading to 342 employees in 2006. During Xbox Summit in Japan, Microsoft revealed Blue Dragon, one of the two role-playing games in development by Mistwalker, a partnership between Microsoft Game Studios Japan with Sakaguchi, Akira Toriyama, and Nobuo Uematsu. The game was directed by Takuya Matsumoto, who previsouly worked in Blinx 2 at MGSJ, and was released in December 2006 on Japan, and in August 2007 on other regions. In February 2006, Maruyama ressigned as the Head of Xbox Japan at Microsoft Development to an estrategic position within Microsoft's Entertainment and Devices division at MGS. Microsoft Japan's veteran Takashi Sensui replaced Maruyama as the new general manager of Xbox Japan.

Famitsu announced Microsoft Game Studios Japan's new game, Infinite Undiscovery, in their weekly magazine in September 2006. Hajime Kojima and tri-Ace will provide development support, and the game stated to release in 2007. At the TGS 2007, tri-Ace revealed Square Enix as the new publisher of the game because of their "know-how" with role-playing games, and Microsoft Japan would maintain its work on the project and serves as the copyright owners of the game. Also at that year' TGS, Microsoft Japan unveiled Ninja Gaiden II for the Xbox 360, following the successful reboot and its re-release Ninja Gaiden Black in 2005. Microsoft will publish the game worldwide apart from Tecmo, and shares co-development and supervision with its Microsoft Game Studios Japan. FromSoftware and Microsoft returned to collaborate on the Xbox 360 with Ninja Blade being announced in 2008. Producer Masanori Takeuchi draw a concept of an Hollywood action film-inspired game and worked closely with Microsoft Game Studios Japan to create the game's protagonist, Ken Ogawa. Followed by a demo released in Japan in December 2008, the game was released worldwide in 2009.

After a number of delays, MGSJ and Mistwalker released Lost Odyssey in 2007. Alongside Microsoft Game Studios Japan, Feelplus was brought in to assist with the game's development, and the game transitioned from the original Xbox to Xbox 360, adopting the Unreal Engine 3. A number of MGSJ developers were recruited to Feelplus to work on the game, including most staff who worked on Phantom Dust, Ninja Gaiden, and Infinite Undiscovery. Cry On, another Mistwalker role-playing game in development for the Xbox 360, was ultimately cancelled in December 2008. The game draws inspirations from The Last Guardian, and after its announcement in 2005 alongside Blue Dragon and Lost Odyssey, it went silent until its cancellation by AQ Interactive after revaluing current market and Microsoft's Japanese divisions slowly less interest in the internal development of role-playing games. Pursuing third-party publishers, MGSJ partnered with Namco Tales Studio to develop the next entry of Tales series exclusively for the Xbox 360. During 2007's Jump Festa, Namco announced the game as Tales of Vesperia, for a 2008 release in Japan. Namco Tales Studio received communication and support from Microsoft Game Studios Japan team to optimize and best utilize the platform, including the Xbox Live. In the same fashion, Microsoft and Square Enix pitch the idea that conceived in The Last Remnant, developed by the SaGa and Final Fantasy teams alongside MGSJ. It was intended by Square Enix president Yoichi Wada to "become a cornerstone" for their worldwide strategy and partnership with Microsoft.

=== Kinect focus and closure (2009–2014) ===
In early 2009, Microsoft reassessed its position in the Japanese gaming market and the impact of the Xbox 360 in Asia and Japan, noting how the console had not achieved the company's expected results in those regions, compared to North America and Europe. Along with layoffs during the Great Recession, MGSJ was also affected, with employees remaining to focus on supporting the future Project Natal, later revealed as the Kinect for Xbox 360. During 2010's TGS, Sensui and CVP for Microsoft Games Studios Phil Spencer announced multiple Japanese projects in development for the Kinect, with MGSJ collaborating to help the studios with consult and assistance, which included Diabolical Pitch by Grasshopper Manufacture, previously known as Codename D, horror-themed adventure game Haunt by NanaOn-Sha, Fire Pro Wrestling by Spike Chunsoft, and Crimson Dragon by Grounding Inc. and Yukio Futatsugi. By 2011, MGSJ staff consisted in 220 employees, and after Xbox One release in 2013 and the studio collaboration in D4: Dark Dreams Don't Die, Sensui was moved from Xbox Japan's headquarters to the US-based Microsoft Studios in November 2014, and since then the studio was silently closed among other layoffs at Microsoft.

== Games developed ==
Year	Title	Platform(s)	Notes
2002	Shenmue II	Xbox	Support development
2002	Blinx: The Time Sweeper	Xbox	Lead development
2002	Kakuto Chojin: Back Alley Brutal	Xbox	Lead development
2002	Sneakers	Xbox	Lead development
2003	Magatama	Xbox	Lead development
2003	N.U.D.E.@ Natural Ultimate Digital Experiment	Xbox	Lead development
2004	Phantom Dust	Xbox	Lead development
2004	Kingdom Under Fire: The Crusaders	Xbox	Lead development
2004	Blinx 2: Masters of Time and Space	Xbox	Supervision and development support
2005	Kingdom Under Fire: Heroes	Xbox	Supervision and development support
2005	Every Party	Xbox 360	Lead development
2006	Ninety-Nine Nights	Xbox 360	Lead development
2006	Blue Dragon	Xbox 360	Supervision and development support
2007	Lost Odyssey	Xbox 360	Supervision and development support
2007	Kingdom Under Fire: Circle of Doom	Xbox 360	Supervision and development support
2008	Ninja Gaiden II	Xbox 360	Supervision and development support
2008	Infinite Undiscovery	Xbox 360	Lead development
2009	Ninja Blade	Xbox 360	Supervision and development support
2012	Diabolical Pitch	Xbox 360	Consult assistance and supervision
2012	Fire Pro Wrestling	Xbox 360	Lead development
2012	Haunt	Xbox 360	Lead development
2013	Crimson Dragon	Xbox One	Consult assistance and supervision
2014	D4: Dark Dreams Don't Die	Xbox One	Consult assistance and supervision
