= Naoto Ohshima =

Japanese video game designer and artist (born 1964)

- 大島 直人
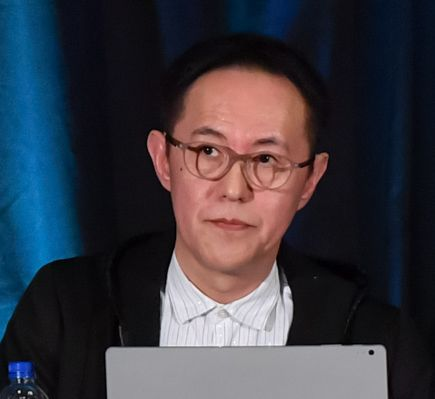
- Ohshima in 2018
- Born: February 26, 1964 (age 62); Osaka, Japan
- Other name: Big Island
- Education: Kyoto Seika University
- Occupations: Character designer, game producer
- Employers: Sega (1987–1999); Artoon (1999–2010); Arzest (2010–present)
- Known for: Sonic the Hedgehog series; Nights into Dreams

Naoto Ohshima (大島 直人, Ōshima Naoto) (born February 26, 1964) is a Japanese video game designer and artist. With Yuji Naka and Hirokazu Yasuhara, he is the co-creator of the Sonic the Hedgehog franchise by Sega and designed the characters Sonic and Dr. Eggman.

== Career ==
Oshima designed Sonic the Hedgehog and Dr. Eggman from Sega's Sonic the Hedgehog franchise. Although Yuji Naka made a tech demo around which Sonic's gameplay was based, the character in his prototype was a ball that lacked any specific features and was based on Ohshima's game proposal. Sonic Team considered numerous potential animal mascots before deciding on Ohshima's design, with an armadillo or hedgehog being the top choices because their spikes worked well with the concept of rolling into enemies. Early in his career, he was credited under the nickname "Big Island" in a number of games, which is a literal translation of his family name.

After leaving Sonic Team, Ohshima formed an independent company, Artoon in 1999. There, he worked on games such as Pinobee (2001), Blinx: The Time Sweeper (2002), and Blinx 2: Masters of Time & Space (2004). In 2010, Artoon was absorbed into AQ Interactive, and Ohshima and other key members of Artoon left to form Arzest.

Oshima reunited with Naka to develop Balan Wonderworld (2021), co-developed with Arzest. It received generally negative reviews and underperformed commercially.

== Works ==
| Year | Game | Role |
|---|---|---|
| 1987 | Phantasy Star | Enemy artist |
| 1988 | Space Harrier 3-D | Artist |
| 1988 | SpellCaster | Artist |
| 1989 | Phantasy Star II | Artist |
| 1989 | Tommy Lasorda Baseball | Artist |
| 1989 | Last Battle | Art director |
| 1990 | Fatal Labyrinth | Artist |
| 1991 | Sonic the Hedgehog | Character artist |
| 1993 | Sonic CD | Director |
| 1995 | Knuckles' Chaotix | Original character concept |
| 1996 | Nights into Dreams | Director, character artist |
| 1996 | Sonic 3D Blast | Advisor |
| 1997 | Sonic Jam | Supervisor |
| 1997 | Sonic R | Graphic advisor |
| 1998 | Burning Rangers | Director, character artist, graphic artist |
| 1998 | Sonic Adventure | Event motion designer, story event coordinator |
| 2001 | Pinobee: Wings of Adventure | Director, character artist |
| 2002 | The King of Fighters EX: Neo Blood | Art director |
| 2002 | Ghost Vibration | Game designer |
| 2002 | Blinx: The Time Sweeper | Director, game designer |
| 2004 | Blinx 2: Masters of Time and Space | Director, game designer |
| 2004 | Yoshi's Universal Gravitation | Producer |
| 2006 | Yoshi's Island DS | Senior producer |
| 2006 | Blue Dragon | Executive producer |
| 2007 | Vampire Rain | Producer |
| 2008 | Away: Shuffle Dungeon | Producer, character artist |
| 2009 | Ju-On: The Grudge | Chief producer |
| 2010 | FlingSmash | Senior producer |
| 2010 | Echoshift | Producer |
| 2011 | Wii Play: Motion | Director |
| 2014 | Yoshi's New Island | Development producer |
| 2015 | Terra Battle | Special character illustration |
| 2016 | Mario & Sonic at the Rio 2016 Olympic Games | Supervisor |
| 2017 | Hey! Pikmin | Development producer |
| 2021 | Balan Wonderworld | Development producer, character artist |
| 2023 | Sonic Superstars | Development producer, character artist |
| TBA | Monkey Quest | Writer |
