= Echochrome II =

2010 video game

- Developer(s): Japan Studio
- Publisher(s): Sony Computer Entertainment
- Composer(s): Hideki Sakamoto
- Series: Echochrome
- Platform(s): PlayStation 3
- Release: NA: December 21, 2010; EU: December 22, 2010; JP: December 23, 2010
- Genre(s): Puzzle, Action
- Mode(s): Single-player

Echochrome II (Note: Japanese: 無限回廊 光と影の箱, Hepburn: Mugen Kairō: Hikari to Kage no Hako; Infinite Corridor: Light and shadow box) (stylised as echochrome ii) is a 2010 puzzle action game developed by Japan Studio and published by Sony Computer Entertainment for the PlayStation 3. It utilizes the PlayStation Move. The game is the sequel to the 2008 video game, Echochrome, and was released on December 21, 2010. The game's soundtrack holds the record for the longest piece of music ever composed for a video game, at one hour, fifteen minutes, and seven seconds.

== Gameplay ==
The main character is a mannequin made of shadows, which players must lead across a path made of shadows in each level. Players use the PlayStation Move motion controller and the PlayStation Eye camera to rotate levels and control light and shadows. The PlayStation Move controller functions as a light source in the game, and by pointing the light source at different angles to the objects in each level, players can manipulate the shadows of the objects to give the mannequin a path to the goal.

== See also ==
- Echoshift
