= Battle Monsters =

1995 video game

- Japanese cover art
- Developer: Scarab
- Publishers: JP: Naxat Soft; NA/EU: Acclaim Entertainment
- Platform: Sega Saturn
- Release: JP: June 2, 1995; NA: September 30, 1996; EU: 1996
- Genre: Fighting
- Modes: Single-player, multiplayer

Battle Monsters (Note: Battle Monsters (バトルモンスターズ)) is a fighting game developed by Scarab for the Sega Saturn. It was originally published by Naxat Soft in Japan and later published in North America and Europe by Acclaim Entertainment.

== Gameplay ==
Similar to Atari's Pit-Fighter, the game makes heavy use of digitized human actors as the characters, plus some blood influenced by Midway's Mortal Kombat series. The game features 12 playable fighters, and plays out on multi-tiered stages.

== Reception ==
Reception

Review scores
Publication	Score
AllGame	1/5
Electronic Gaming Monthly	3.5/10
GameSpot	4.5/10
Next Generation	2/5

Battle Monsters was panned by most critics, who found that the scaling graphics, complex controls, interactive backgrounds, and multi-tiered arenas do not work together well. They also razed the choppy animation and pixelization on the digitized sprites, and likened the game to a second-rate Way of the Warrior clone. Crispin Boyer of Electronic Gaming Monthly called it "one sorry mess of a fighting game", GamePro said it "doesn't even deserve coverage", and Jeff Gerstmann summarized in GameSpot, "While Battle Monsters does have some good ideas and twists on the standard fighting game, the whole package is poorly executed". However, GameFan defended Battle Monsters, assessing that "The gameplay, though not conventional, can be entertaining, with 12 moves plus a super for each ghoul. And while the digitized graphics don't impress me as much as they did a year ago [when the game was released in Japan], they are still representative of the monsters they surround." Reviewing the Japanese version as an import, Next Generation stated that "the characters are never quite enveloped within the background. Instead, what's left is a nice background with characters which seem to be cut and pasted on to the television screen."

== See also ==
- Killing Zone, sequel
- List of fighting games
