= Object locative environment coordinate system =

The object locative environment coordinate system, known as OLE coordinate system, is a coordinate system used for virtual environments in which movement constraints are not only defined by the 3D coordinates of objects but by the position of the camera, as well. This technology was created by Jun Fujiki.

The system projects screen objects to 2D coordinates using the camera position (using a projection matrix) and uses these coordinates to impart movement constraints to the objects of the system. Echochrome, a game for the PS3 and PSP, uses this technique as an entertainment factor.

== See also ==
- Coordinate system
