= Fire Pro Wrestling (2012 video game) =

- Developers: Spike Chunsoft; Microsoft Game Studios Japan
- Publisher: Microsoft Game Studios
- Series: Fire Pro Wrestling
- Platform: Xbox 360 (XBLA)
- Release: September 21, 2012
- Genre: Sports
- Modes: Single-player, multiplayer

Fire Pro Wrestling is a professional wrestling video game in the Fire Pro Wrestling series, developed by Spike Chunsoft with assistance from Microsoft Game Studios Japan and published by Microsoft Game Studios for the Xbox Live Arcade in 2012.

== Reception ==
Reception

Aggregate score
Aggregator	Score
Metacritic	48/100

Review scores
Publication	Score
Destructoid	2/10
Electronic Gaming Monthly	4/10
GamesMaster	71%
GameZone	4.5/10
Giant Bomb	2/5
Official Xbox Magazine (UK)	4/10
Official Xbox Magazine (US)	6.5/10
Polygon	5/10
411Mania	3.5/10

The game received "generally unfavorable reviews" according to the review aggregation website Metacritic.
