= Diabolical Pitch =

2012 video game

- Developer: Grasshopper Manufacture (Note: Consult and assistance by Microsoft Game Studios Japan)
- Publisher: Microsoft Studios
- Producer: Goichi Suda
- Engine: Unreal Engine 3
- Platform: Xbox 360
- Release: April 4, 2012
- Genres: Action; Sports
- Modes: Single-player; Multiplayer

Diabolical Pitch (Note: Japanese: ディアボリカル・ピッチ, Hepburn: Diaborikaru Pitchi) is a 2012 baseball action video game from Grasshopper Manufacture and Suda51 for the Xbox 360 Kinect.

== Development and release ==
Diabolical Pitch was developed by Grasshopper Manufacture with consulting and assistance by Microsoft's Japanese game studio. The company's founder, Goichi Suda ("Suda51"), conceived the game and served as its executive producer, offering feedback to a dedicated team during its production. With the announcement of Kinect by Microsoft, Grasshopper was initially unsure of how to utilize the technology to create a simple, intuitive, and enjoyable experience for consumers. Voice input was briefly proposed before it was decided that body motion sensing was more appropriate.

Suda believed that pitching matched the body leverage mechanics required by the motion sensor and considered whether or not it would be fun for a player to mimic throwing an object using the device. Grasshopper's chief creative officer Akira Yamaoka elaborated that they based the project on baseball, or more simply throwing and catching a ball, because it was recognizable to most people around the world. Sports are a common element found in the developer's games as Suda recognized the physical abilities of high-profile athletes as "thematically and visually" significant. Baseball had been especially important to the producer since he was child, though he idolized certain players like Sadaharu Oh and Choji Murata rather than entire teams.

Suda claimed he formulated a game prototype involving a pitcher in a fantasy amusement park prior to the announcement of Kinect and that the device's debut was ample opportunity to implement it. In addition to this concept was the "diabolical pitch", which is a term that stems from the familiar Japanese word makyū (魔球), meaning "magic ball". Grasshopper would add its own unique flavor to set it apart from simple baseball simulators, such as giving the player character a bionic arm to hurl balls at waves of bizarre enemies. These enemies were inspired by stuffed animals that could be won from certain carnival games. The game's premise was influenced by baseball manga including Star of the Giants, Astro Kyudan, Samurai Giants, and Yakyū-kyō no Uta. Yamaoka described the "bite-sized" gameplay, and the Kinect experience as a whole, as similar to the brief moments spent with an arcade or amusement park game. Pinball and Extreme Baseball were also referenced for some of the game's mechanics.

Suda had long desired to work with publisher Microsoft, who had asked Grasshopper to make a game for Kinect that would be suitable for both casual and hardcore gamers. Yamaoka stated that the designers wished to "meet halfway" to appeal to both demographics and that adding a fantasy element to the baseball premise of Diabolical Pitch "would ease them into a Kinect experience". The team wanted to maintain the same "punk ethos" present in all of their games whether aimed at casual or hardcore players. Yamaoka believed the Grasshopper's penchant for creativity would be enough to successfully market the game in Japan, where the Xbox 360 was already struggling financially and a region in which the physical space required to use Kinect may be incompatible with the small size of many houses.

The game was first showcased with a teaser trailer at the 2010 Tokyo Game Show (TGS) under the moniker "Codename D". Grasshopper Manufacture registered the trademark for the title Diabolical Pitch in January 2011. It was revealed at TGS 2011 that the two titles were one and the same. Diabolical Pitch was released worldwide on Xbox LIVE Arcade on April 4, 2012 to coincide with the start of the Major League Baseball season. The game sold poorly. According to leaderboard data from Gamasutra, it had the least number of downloads among all Xbox Live Arcade releases in April 2012 with only new 573 players in its first week and 1,103 new players by the end of the month.

== Reception ==
Reception

Aggregate score
Aggregator	Score
Metacritic	56/100

Review scores
Publication	Score
Eurogamer	6/10
GameSpot	3/10
GamesRadar+	2.5/5
IGN	5.5/10
Joystiq	2.5/5
Polygon	4/10

Diabolical Pitch received mixed reviews from critics upon release. On Metacritic, the game holds a score of 56/100 based on 24 reviews.
