= MindJack =

2011 video game

- Developer: feelplus
- Publisher: Square Enix
- Composer: Tsuyoshi Sekito
- Platforms: PlayStation 3, Xbox 360
- Release: NA: January 18, 2011; EU: January 21, 2011; JP: January 27, 2011; AU: February 10, 2011
- Genre: Third-person shooter
- Modes: Single-player, multiplayer

MindJack (マインドジャック, MaindoJakku) is a third-person shooter video game developed by feelplus and published by Square Enix. The game was released for PlayStation 3 and Xbox 360 on January 18, 2011, in North America, January 21, 2011, in Europe, January 27, 2011, in Japan and February 10, 2011, in Australia. The game was originally planned to be released in October 2010 for North America and Europe, but it was pushed back to January 2011. MindJack takes place in 2031, when the world's governments are in decline and new corrupt organizations are arising. The player can "hack" into and control enemies, vehicles, robots, or civilians. In the campaign story mode, the game is single-player but "transitions seamlessly" into co-op. The game received negative reviews from critics.

== Gameplay ==
MindJack is a third-person shooter incorporating a cover system. The player character can carry two weapons and grenades. The player can mind hack civilians and weakened enemies, controlling them as the player character while the main character is controlled by artificial intelligence. Weakened enemies can also be turned to the player's side, becoming allies. Online players can "hack" into a person's single-player campaign and take control of the AI enemies while Player 1 plays the game's story campaign. The online players may help the solo player by attacking other enemies or they can attack Player 1 themselves.

== Development ==
The writing of MindJack's story and script was outsourced to an unnamed company in the United Kingdom as the game was thought to have a greater appeal to Western players than with a scenario created by a Japanese author.

== Story ==
The game's story focuses on agent Jim Corbijin, and a human rights activist, Rebecca Weiss. Agent Corbijin is sent to district 7 to investigate reports of a shootout. When he arrives, the government agents attack him. He then meets up with Ms. Weiss. Agent Mind and Ms. Weiss then go to investigate the rumors of "Project Mindjack".

== Reception ==
Reception

Aggregate score
| Aggregator | Score | |
| Aggregator | PS3 | Xbox 360 |
|---|---|---|
| Metacritic | 44/100 | 43/100 |

Review scores
| Publication | Score | |
| Publication | PS3 | Xbox 360 |
|---|---|---|
| Destructoid | N/A | 5/10 |
| Edge | N/A | 3/10 |
| Eurogamer | 6/10 | 6/10 |
| Famitsu | 26/40 | 26/40 |
| Game Informer | 5/10 | 5/10 |
| GamePro | N/A | 2.5/5 |
| GameSpot | 5/10 | 5/10 |
| GameTrailers | N/A | 4.6/10 |
| IGN | 4/10 | 4/10 |
| Official Xbox Magazine (US) | N/A | 4/10 |
| PlayStation: The Official Magazine | 3/10 | N/A |
| The A.V. Club | N/A | C− |
| Metro | N/A | 3/10 |

The game received "generally unfavorable reviews" on both platforms according to the review aggregation website Metacritic.

Eurogamer called it "a strange blend of Resident Evil 5, Uncharted and Minority Report," stating "If you can look past the lack of polish and horrible graphics, there's a compelling and unique take on cover-based shooters here, along with an interesting lesson on how games deal with plot. It's a rewarding little game, if you can hack it." GameSpot praised MindJack's concept and online multiplayer, but concluded "Mindjack does have a few bright spots, but they are smothered beneath the weight of the awkward controls and squandered potential." IGN summed up their review with "Mindjack is ultimately a frustrating and forgettable shooter with horrible presentation, clumsy controls and a plodding campaign. It serves up a next-gen idea with its unique multiplayer design yet delivers it in a horribly last-gen package." Official Xbox Magazine UK's verdict was that "Nobody in their right mind should buy this." In Japan, Famitsu gave it a score of two sevens and two sixes for a total of 26 out of 40.

Ben "Yahtzee" Croshaw of Zero Punctuation ranked the game fifth on his list of the Worst Games of 2011; he called the game "A succession of square rooms populated by characters who couldn't have reached any level of decent characterization if they had a rocket-powered stepladder. Its sole innovation was the ability to possess other people in the battlefield, a feature which only served to illustrate that absolutely no one was having fun."
