= Ninety-Nine Nights II =

2010 video game

N3II: Ninety-Nine Nights
- Developer: feelplus
- Publisher: Konami
- Director: Kenichiro Tsukuda
- Producer: Tak Fujii
- Writer: Matsuzo Machida
- Platform: Xbox 360
- Release: NA: June 29, 2010; JP: July 22, 2010; EU: September 10, 2010; AU: September 21, 2010
- Genres: Hack and slash, action role-playing
- Modes: Single-player, multiplayer

Ninety-Nine Nights II (ナインティナイン・ナイツII, NaintiNain Naitsu II), stylized as N3II: Ninety-Nine Nights, is a role-playing video game with hack and slash game mechanics set in a high fantasy game universe, where a demon army is rising with one million troops. It is a sequel to Ninety-Nine Nights and was published by Konami. The game was released between June and September 2010 in North America, Japan, and European regions.

== Development ==
The game was unveiled at Microsoft Game Studios's TGS 2008 press conference, for Xbox 360.

Developed by feelplus, the game's art style is noticeably darker than its predecessor.

At the Konami E3 2010 press conference, the lead producer of the series, Tak Fujii noted that the sequel has been vastly improved technically, allowing hundreds of enemies to be present on screen in one shot. Some of the main changes the sequel introduces include an online co-op mode, leaderboards and brand new difficulty levels which make the game harder.

After the press conference Tak Fujii was also interviewed by G4TV and GameSpot.

== Reception ==
Reception

Aggregate score
Aggregator	Score
Metacritic	45/100

Review scores
Publication	Score
The A.V. Club	D
Edge	4/10
Eurogamer	4/10
Famitsu	(X360) 34/40; 30/40
Game Informer	6/10
GamePro	2.5/5
GameRevolution	C+
GameSpot	3.5/10
GamesRadar+	3/5
GameTrailers	4.8/10
GameZone	4/10
IGN	4/10
Joystiq	2/5
Official Xbox Magazine (US)	6/10
The Escapist	2/5
Metro	2/10

The game received "unfavorable" reviews according to the review aggregation website Metacritic. Both IGN and GameSpot criticized the gameplay and plot, as well as poor lip-syncing, noting an absence of challenge in core gameplay as well as frustrating boss fights. In Japan, however, Famitsu gave it a score of two eights and two sevens, while Famitsu X360 gave it a score of two nines and two eights.

Steve Butts of The Escapist gave the game two stars out of five, saying that Ninety-Nine Nights II has the fast combat, a large amount of enemies to fight and fantasy setting that the players can expect from this genre, but said that the fighting is tedious and the enemies are unchallenging. David Wolinsky of The A.V. Club gave it a D and was critical to its "monotonous" gameplay. Roger Hargreaves of Metro gave it two out of ten, calling it a "tedious" Dynasty Warriors clone.
