= Blinx: The Time Sweeper =

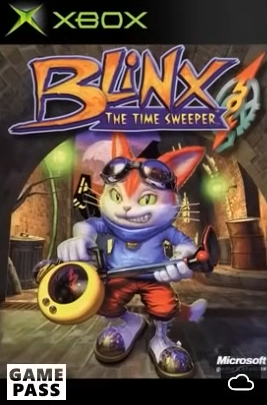
- Cover art for Xbox Game Pass
- Developers: Artoon; Microsoft Game Studios Japan (Note: Supervision and development support)
- Publisher: Microsoft Game Studios
- Director: Naoto Ohshima
- Producers: Katsunori Yamaji; Earnest Yuen
- Programmer: Takuya Matsumoto
- Artist: Masamichi Harada
- Writer: Soshi Kawasaki
- Composers: Mariko Nanba; Keiichi Sugiyama
- Platform: Xbox
- Release: NA: October 8, 2002; AU: October 16, 2002; EU: November 8, 2002; JP: December 12, 2002
- Genre: Platform
- Mode: Single-player

Blinx: The Time Sweeper is a 2002 platform game developed by Artoon in partnership with Microsoft Game Studios Japan and published by Microsoft Game Studios for the Xbox. Advertised as "The World's First 4-D Action Game", the game focuses on the titular character, an anthropomorphic cat called Blinx, who is on a mission to prevent the end of World B1Q64 and rescue its princess from the evil Tom-Tom Gang. Blinx is outfitted with the TS-1000 Vacuum Cleaner, with which he can slow, speed up, record, reverse, and stop time. Blinx was positioned by the gaming press as a mascot character for Microsoft to use to compete against Nintendo's Mario, Sega's Sonic the Hedgehog, and Sony's Crash Bandicoot, though the character was never used as such officially by Microsoft.

The game received mixed reviews. A sequel, Blinx 2: Masters of Time and Space, was released in 2004.

The game was made available for Xbox Backwards Compatibility for PC on July 22, 2026; it subsequently became available across all tiers of Xbox Game Pass.

== Gameplay ==
Blinx: The Time Sweeper is an action-platformer, with the player controlling the titular character of Blinx. The player is initially equipped with the TS-1000 Vacuum Cleaner, which can sweep up parts of the environment (referred to in-game as trash), gold crystals, cat medals, and time crystals; they are also able to shoot out collected trash. The player can purchase better vacuums with their collected gold to sweep larger objects. By collecting at least three of the same time crystals, the player gains one time control related to the crystals collected, receiving two if four are collected. The player can also receive up to three retries by collecting red hearts in the same manner.

Using time controls, the player can affect the level in one of five ways: reversing time (REW), speeding up time (FF), slowing down time (SLOW), pausing time (PAUSE), and recording their movements for a period of time to create a clone of themselves (REC). The time controls do not affect the player, allowing them to maneuver through the stage as the control is being used. If the player is defeated and has a retry, a process similar to the REW time control occurs, although the player is also reversed to a prior state before they were defeated. Each stage must be completed within a 10-minute timer by defeating all enemies in a stage and entering the goal gate.

== Plot ==
When a gang of evil pigs known as the Tom-Tom Gang begin stealing time from World B1Q64, it becomes temporally unstable to the extent that the Time Sweepers decide that it is safer for all worlds if the supply of time to World B1Q64 be halted, suspending it and its inhabitants indefinitely. When Blinx receives a message from a young princess, trapped within the doomed world, Blinx proceeds to the room in which the portal leading to World B1Q64 is kept. Although the rest of the Time Factory staff are against it, Blinx dives into the portal moments before it closes. He then travels to several parts of the world, fighting the time monsters, and recovering the resulting crystals in a desperate attempt to save World B1Q64.

After a long journey, he manages to catch up with the Tom-Toms and the princess in Momentopolis. He follows them towards the stadium, which is surrounded by a large number of time crystals. Suddenly, light emerges in the center of the stadium's platform, causing the Tom-Tom Gang and the Princess to freeze, and circle the light, along with the rest of the time crystals. The combination of time crystals, Princess, and Tom-Toms creates the final time monster: the Chronohorn, which can use Time Controls as well. Before Blinx can fight it, the Chronohorn rewinds time, and forces Blinx to fight four previous bosses. After he defeats them all again, he fights the Chronohorn, wins and saves the sleeping princess while letting the Tom-Toms escape.

With the Tom-Toms gone, and time beginning to flow in World B1Q64 again, Blinx is content that his mission is complete. As the princess Lena wakes up on the bench she was placed on, Blinx reluctantly says goodbye and leaves. The princess tries to follow him, but he jumps into a portal and ends up back in the Time Factory to be welcomed by applause from the other Time Sweepers. An announcement from the Mother Computer explains that World B1Q64 will not be cut off from the Time Factory, and Blinx is congratulated by the CEO of the Time Factory. After the credits roll, the player sees a message written by the princess (her real name, Princess Lena, is revealed at this point). The message says that Lena has the time crystals that Blinx collected, and that she will use them for the most important thing of all. Using the time crystals, she rewinds time to when Blinx is about to leave. Before he jumps in the portal again, she wakes up, gives Blinx a hug, and thanks him.

== Development ==
In February 2002, the Xbox was released in Japan. Microsoft, aiming to gain a foothold in the market, began partnering with Japanese developers to create games that would appeal to Japanese gamers. One of the companies they would approach was Artoon, founded three years prior in 1999 by Sonic the Hedgehog designer Naoto Ohshima alongside various Sega developers. The team loved the idea of a cat that could control time, especially in combination with the processing power of the Xbox, and formed a partnership between them and Microsoft's Japanese-based Microsoft Game Studios Japan to work on the idea.

Development of Blinx began under the codename Pelon, with it quickly progressing along as the two teams communicated. Ed Fries, the vice president of publishing at Microsoft and executive producer of Blinx, would later state that the game was "the most promising game [they] were developing" for Japan, and that the focus was more on how the game played, rather than the creation of a mascot for the Xbox. The idea of the titular character Blinx serving as a mascot came later in development as the game took shape, at one point even being suggested to CEO of Microsoft, Bill Gates, but the team would quickly refocus the mascot concept as being for Japan only. Microsoft and the game's developers would claim that the game's main time mechanic was only possible on the Xbox, stating that the console's large internal hard drive was necessary for such a game to work. The game's soundtrack was composed by Mariko Nanba and Keiichi Sugiyama, credited as WaveMaster Inc., a subsidiary of Sega.

== Reception and legacy ==
=== Reviews ===
Reception

Aggregate score
Aggregator	Score
Metacritic	71/100

Review scores
Publication	Score
AllGame	2.5/5
Edge	5/10
Electronic Gaming Monthly	7/10
Eurogamer	6/10
Famitsu	31/40
Game Informer	7.75/10
GamePro	3.5/5
GameRevolution	C+
GameSpot	6.3/10
GameSpy	2/5
GameZone	8/10
IGN	8.8/10
Official Xbox Magazine (US)	7.4/10
Entertainment Weekly	C
Maxim	8/10

Blinx: The Time Sweeper received "mixed or average" reviews, according to review aggregator Metacritic. GameSpy placed the game at 6th in its "Most Overrated Games Ever" feature in 2004. Although the graphics were generally praised, the game's execution, notably the control method, was considered to have resulted in the game being too difficult.

GameSpot editor Greg Kasavin gave it a score of 6.3 out of 10, noting that players get a sense of relief from completing a level, rather than enjoyment or satisfaction. It was a runner-up for GameSpot's annual "Most Disappointing Game on Xbox" award, which went to ToeJam & Earl III. Electronic Gaming Monthly gave it 7.5/5.5/8: the second reviewer found the game to be tedious and repetitive, but the third believed that "issues aside, the unique style and play mechanics make [it] stand out". In Japan, Famitsu gave it a score of 31 out of 40.

GameSpy suggested that Blinx was proposed as a possible mascot for the Xbox system, rivaling Nintendo's Mario and Sega's Sonic the Hedgehog, and since the main character of Halo: Combat Evolved (Master Chief) was considered too violent (and also lacking an identity behind a visor), the officials wanted a "friendly, furry face" to lead the sales among the younger clientele. Due to the game's unpopularity, it never achieved the suggested goal and Master Chief is unofficially seen as the mascot, though Blinx was at one point proposed as the mascot for the Xbox in Japan.

=== Sales ===
Saleswise, by 2003, 156,000 copies were sold. That same year, Blinx also entered the Platinum Hits range with minor gameplay updates that were intended to reduce the difficulty of the game (as part of the all-age Platinum Family Hits). As of 2004, the game sold over 600,000 copies worldwide, despite not selling as well as Microsoft had hoped in Japan.
