= The World of Golden Eggs =

Japanese animated series

- Cover art for the DVD The World of Golden Eggs Vol. 1 featuring Rebecca and Lisa.
- Genre: Surreal comedy, parody
- Anime television series
- Studio: PLUS heads inc. (production); Studio Crocodile (animation)
- Original network: CS Kids Station
- Original run: 2005 – 2006
- Episodes: 26
- Video game

The World of Golden Eggs: Nori Nori Rhythm-kei
- Developer: Artoon
- Publisher: AQ Interactive
- Genre: Music, action
- Platform: Wii
- Released: June 26, 2008
- Video game

The World of Golden Eggs: Nori Nori Uta Dekichatte Kei
- Developer: Artoon
- Publisher: AQ Interactive
- Genre: Music, action
- Platform: Nintendo DS
- Released: February 17, 2009

The World of Golden Eggs is an anime series made by PLUS heads inc. and Studio Crocodile. The World of Golden Eggs #1 was ranked 9th out of the top 20 anime DVDs sold in Japan in 2007, with 59,000 copies sold. The World of Golden Eggs Season 2 DVD-Box was ranked 12th with 49,000 sold and The World of Golden Eggs #2 was ranked 15th with 47,000 copies sold.

The World of Golden Eggs Vol. 01 was voted top selling anime/special effects DVD in Japan in 2008 with 97,292 copies.

The anime was adapted into a Wii game and a Nintendo DS game called The World of Golden Eggs: Nori Nori Rhythm-kei and The World of Golden Eggs: Nori Nori Uta Dekichatte Kei respectively.

== Structure ==
The World Of Golden Eggs is a collection of non-linear sketches, set in the American-style, fictional town of Turkey's Hill. Each episode is about 15 minutes in length and is broken down into the "main story" as broadcast by the town's fictional TV station, "THBC" (Turkey's Hill Broad Casting) and broken up by fictitious adverts and concluded with an English lesson based on content from the episode's main story line. The main story is usually subtitled in English. The subtitles try to reflect the tone of the dialogue which can lead to strange or grammatically incorrect subtitles due to its comedic nature and the use of non-conventional Japanese.

Each story is loosely linked to a main story, but is presented from the different perspectives of the vast cast of characters.

The show has a musical influence, with many of the characters involved in music in some way. Some of the music from the show has even appeared on MTV and has been the basis for the video games based on the show.

== Broadcast ==
It has been broadcast on CS Kids Station, MUSIC ON!TV, and MTV Japan. It was also streamed online through BIGLOBE. Other broadcasters include: tvk, TOKYO MX, KBS Kyoto, USEN Internet Programs and GyaO.

In February 2006, "Larry", one of the voicecast members, launched a podcast on iTunes entitled "Larry's Show".

Following the broadcast in 2005, Season 1 was released in 2006 on DVD. Season 2 was broadcast in 2006 and was released in 2007 on DVD.

== Characters ==
The World Of Golden Eggs features a wide cast of characters who usually re-appear in various sketches. The cast of characters include:

- Amura (voiced by Namie Amuro)
- Rose and Mary - a pair of exercise loving chefs. They host the segment entitled "Nori-Nori Cooking".
- Coach - coach of Turkey Hill High School's American football team. He likes to use the word "necessary".
- Mark - a player in the Turkey Hill High School's American football team. His catch phrase is "Just do it!".
- Paul - a somewhat shy quarterback for Turkey Hill High School's American football team.
- Robert - a teacher at Turkey Hill High School, he is often the victim of the vice-principal's over-enthusiastic chatter.
- Vice principal - the talkative vice principal of Turkey Hill High School.
- Michael - a member of Turkey Hill High School's bodybuilding club.
- Max - host of "Trend Hunting".
- Turkey Ranger - an action hero and local celebrity. His real name is Ryan.
- Kevin & Paul - a pair of turkeys who have escaped from a farm and are looking to pick up some female turkeys.
- Norman & Bob - fans of the cheerleaders at Turkey Hill High School. They are usually seen with large-lensed cameras.
- Rebecca - Lisa's best friend.
- Lisa - Rebecca's best friend.
- Tengu-chan - host of "Trend Hunting".
- Michelle - Rebecca's French teacher. Her nickname is Michael.
- Emilio - Antonio's bedridden grandfather, voiced by Shun Oguri.

== Media ==
=== Anime ===
The first anime DVD, The World of Golden Eggs Vol. 01, and the second anime DVD were released on August 3, 2005. The third anime DVD, The World of Golden Eggs "Season 2" Vol. 03, and fourth anime DVD, The World of Golden Eggs "Season 2" Vol. 04, were released on August 24, 2007. All releases were handled by Warner Home Video.

The series was legally available on the AnimeLog YouTube channel until 2024.

=== Games ===
Cover of the Nintendo DS game, The World of Golden Eggs: Nori Nori Uta Dekichatte Kei

The anime was adapted into an action and music Wii game, called The World of Golden Eggs: Nori Nori Rhythm-kei, which was developed by Artoon and published by AQ Interactive and was released in Japan on June 26, 2008.

AQ Interactive released a puzzle Nintendo DS game, called The World of Golden Eggs: Nori Nori Uta Dekichatte Kei, on February 17, 2009, in Japan.

=== Music ===
On September 22, 2005, wint released an animation soundtrack for The World of Golden Eggs.

On March 22, 2008, wint released an animation soundtrack for season two of The World of Golden Eggs anime.

On March 11, 2009, wint released a The World of Golden Eggs DVD for the Japan tour in Tokyo called The World of Golden Eggs "Music Complete".

=== Commercial ads ===
Nissan released a series of commercial ads in 2008 featuring characters from the series in collaboration with its newest Note model (marketing). It also released a DVD in 2 versions: "Nissan Note x The World of Golden Eggs" and "Nissan Note x The World of Golden Eggs: Vol. 2".

== Reception ==
The World of Golden Eggs #1 was ranked 9th out of the top 20 anime DVDs sold in Japan in 2007, with 59,000 copies sold. The first volume of The World of Golden Eggs was ranked 26th best selling DVD in Japan for the first half of 2008 at 88,707 copies, The World of Golden Eggs Vol. 01 was voted top selling anime/special effects DVD in Japan in 2008 with 97,292 copies. The World of Golden Eggs Season 2 DVD-Box was ranked 12th with 49,000 sold and The World of Golden Eggs #2 was ranked 15th with 47,000 copies sold. The second volume of The World of Golden Eggs was ranked 39th best selling DVD in Japan for the first half of 2008 at 67,731 copies.
