= True Fantasy Live Online =

Cancelled video game

- Developer(s): Level-5; Microsoft Game Studios Japan
- Publisher(s): Microsoft Game Studios
- Producer(s): Akihiro Hino
- Writer(s): Akihiro Hino
- Platform(s): Xbox
- Release: Cancelled
- Genre(s): MMORPG
- Mode(s): Multiplayer

True Fantasy Live Online was an MMORPG in development by Level-5 and Microsoft Game Studios Japan and set to be published by Microsoft Game Studios for the Xbox. Initially proposed as a standard RPG, it was re-imagined as an MMO, reflecting Level-5 CEO Akihiro Hino's interest in online games. If released, it would have been one of the first console-exclusive MMORPGs, following the Square-developed Final Fantasy XI for the PlayStation 2. It was planned to be set in a large fantasy world, where users could choose a character from one of five races and almost thirty unique classes, including many non-combat roles.

True Fantasy Live Online would have attempted to appeal to both hardcore and casual players at the same time, with proficiency-based skills rather than an overall player level. While it was well-received and anticipated by critics as the Xbox's "great hope" for the MMO genre, Microsoft ultimately cancelled the game on June 2, 2004 following development delays, despite Level-5's desire to see the game completed. The cause was speculated by Hino to be the Xbox platform's failure to gain a large Japanese userbase, given that True Fantasy Live Online was to be a Japan-centric game.

== Gameplay ==
Several player characters of various fantasy races in a town area.

True Fantasy Live Online was planned to have different features than most MMOs of the time. Akihiro Hino, the CEO of Level-5, expressed the belief that while MMOs were fun for the first 20 or 30 hours, he became distressed when he realized that he was on a "level treadmill" of equipment, items, enemies and player characters advancing at the same rate. Instead, he planned for real human gamemasters to constantly monitor the world. A "life timeline" for each character class was created, in an attempt to make each class interesting to play for hundreds of hours. The game would have supported five active characters per account, with nearly thirty unique classes. The concept of "leveling up" would have been abolished, and instead characters would have gained skill proficiencies through repeated use, and by combining ones already learned. This was designed so that casual and hardcore players would not be stratified into different groups depending on their level.

Combat in the game was real-time, allowing players to target enemies for attacks. Some classes were designed as non-combat roles, such as being a chef, blacksmith, or entrepreneur. For example, a player could not only catch fish, but also make it into sushi. The game would have contained a fully-featured character creation system that allowed for a choice of five available races: elf, dwarf, human, chilto, and vogul, and customization of every aspect of the player character's face. Depending on the player's class and race, the game would have filtered players' voice chat to match their character, in an effort to boost immersion - such as making a fairy character speak in a high-pitched tone, or an ogre in a deep and powerful one. Spoken macros would also have existed to supplement the voice chat.

The game's environments were varied, and would have allowed for traversal using different types of mounts - horses, camels, and horned, raptor-like draconic creatures resembling chocobos were prominently depicted in screenshots. Besides content, various side content and activities were planned to make the game world feel like a real city or town, such as casinos or coliseums. Players would gain their own apartments that could be customized at will, and could ally themselves with one of multiple countries, such as the Kingdom of Cleria or the Magic City.

== Development ==
True Fantasy Live Online was originally proposed by Microsoft Game Studios Japan as a role-playing video game for Xbox. Hino counter-offered by proposing to develop an MMORPG, believing it was the "future of gaming" compared to traditional RPGs, though he did not believe that single-player games would be supplanted, calling them "fundamentally different". He had been an avid player of Ultima Online, one of the first MMO-style games, and thought that with the resources of Microsoft, they would be able to create a large game world. The two companies had an unusually close relationship, with Level-5 being one of the hottest independent developers at the time. The game was planned to be structured around players being able to choose their character and community.

True Fantasy Live Online was one of the first planned console MMORPGs in video game history, after Final Fantasy XI in 2002. It would also have been the first MMORPG for Xbox.

=== Cancellation ===
Despite being "fully playable" and near completion according to Microsoft around the time of its cancellation, the title's development was littered with complications from the beginning. One such problem was Level-5's inexperience with online network coding and their inability to properly implement voice chat compatibility into the game, a feature never before implemented on such a large scale in an MMORPG. However, Microsoft was very adamant on its inclusion, as it was a key feature to their Xbox Live service.

Relations between the two companies began to spiral out of control as Level-5 struggled to meet the demands required by Microsoft, who in turn grew frustrated at the lack of progress being made on the game. After a short showing at the Tokyo Game Show in 2003, True Fantasy Live Online was delayed from its initial Fall 2003 release into 2004. From then, little was seen or heard about the title, and after being absent from E3's 2004 convention, it was officially cancelled by Microsoft on June 3.

Hino stated that the cancellation was "terribly disappointing", noting that Level-5 wanted to see the game's development through to the end. He called it entirely Microsoft's decision, saying it was likely due to the Xbox's unpopularity in Japan. While saying he wanted to continue development, he said it would not be feasible under current market conditions.

In a 2008 interview with Edge magazine, Shane Kim, former general manager of Microsoft Game Studios spoke in regard to failed Microsoft MMORPG projects, including True Fantasy Live Online. While acknowledging that the cancellations were the right thing to do at the time, Kim also felt that such games could have been successful on the Xbox 360 platform.

== Reception ==
In an E3 2003 preview, Hilary Goldstein of IGN wrote that character creation was "relatively painless", and praised the fact that players could not run out of things to enjoy even if they simply remained in town and never went out adventuring. Remarking that every item had value, and players could set up their own street market anywhere, she also called the battles "smooth" and "fairly easy to perform", noting that the combat system was more fun than EverQuest. She called the visual style one of the best she had seen in a video game, saying it was filled with "awesome visual touches" like leaves in trees blown by the wind, despite falling short of games in the Zelda series.

Koji Aizawa of GMR visited Level-5 offices to see the game, calling it "incredibly beautiful", with a "detailed" and "immense" world. Noting the depth of character creation, he said that making duplicates of various anime characters was possible. XBM also complimented the graphics, calling it an "amazing-looking game".
