= Survival Arts =

1993 video game

- North American arcade flyer
- Developer: Scarab
- Publisher: Sammy
- Director: Mutsuo Kaneko
- Programmer: Yoshio Asai
- Composer: Shigeyuki Shinbo
- Platform: Arcade
- Release: October 1993
- Genre: Fighting
- Modes: Single-player, multiplayer

Survival Arts (Note: Japanese: サバイバルアーツ, Hepburn: Sabaibaru Ātsu) is a 1993 fighting video game developed by Scarab and published by Sammy for arcades. It uses digitized images of real actors with blood and gore, similar to Midway's arcade hit Mortal Kombat.

Ports for the Super NES and Sega Genesis were announced in early 1994, but quietly cancelled the following year. The monks from Viper's stage later appeared in Dyna Gear, another arcade game developed by Scarab and published by Sammy.

== Gameplay ==
Survival Arts is quite similar to Midway's Mortal Kombat franchise in terms of presentation, but with gameplay inspired by Capcom's Street Fighter II. The player's character fights against their opponent in best two-out-of-three matches in a single player tournament mode with the computer or against another human player. Players have a character roster of eight fighters to choose from the start, each with their own fighting style and special techniques. One unique feature is that players can pick up multiple weapons (from swords to guns) that are dropped on stage and use against the opponent. Depending on what move or weapon the player uses as the last hit against the opponent while it knocks them out, the defeated opponent will either be burned, disassembled, sliced in half in two different ways, decapitated or electrocuted, which is as simple as performing deaths in Barbarian: The Ultimate Warrior. While combos can be performed in the game, they can end with a death, which makes it a precursor to the "Brutalities" in Mortal Kombat 3 and some of its successors.

== Plot ==
The birthplace of the powerful physical martial arts called "Survival Arts" and how they were earned became mysterious for quite some time. However, eight warriors spreading over different countries have learned some of the most important skills of the Survival Arts, while they continue learning more about them. Each one qualified for the Survival Arts tournament to see which survivor will win and obtain all the secrets of the Arts.

There are nine characters in the game.

== Reception ==
Play Meter listed Survival Arts to be the fifty-eighth most-popular arcade game at the time.
