= Boing! Docomodake DS =

2007 video game

- North American box art
- Developer(s): Suzak; AQ Interactive
- Publisher(s): Ignition Entertainment: JP: AQ Interactive
- Designer(s): Yoshikazu Harada
- Platform(s): Nintendo DS
- Release: JP: December 6, 2007; PAL: February 27, 2009; NA: March 10, 2009
- Genre(s): Puzzle-platform
- Mode(s): Single-player, Multiplayer

Boing! Docomodake DS (ぽろろんっ! ドコモダケDS, Pororon! Docomodake DS) is a puzzle-platform game starring NTT DoCoMo's mascot, Docomodake. Their rival is NHK's mascot, Domo-Kun who has been in games of his own. It was developed by Suzak and AQ Interactive.

== Reception ==
Boing! Docomodake DS received "mixed or average" reviews from critics, according to the review aggregation website Metacritic.
