= Patchwork Heroes =

2010 video game

- Developer(s): Acquire; Japan Studio
- Publisher(s): Sony Computer Entertainment
- Director(s): Yuki Ikeda
- Producer(s): Yuki Ikeda
- Artist(s): Seiichi Terashima
- Composer(s): Hideki Sakamoto
- Platform(s): PlayStation Portable
- Release: JP: February 18, 2010; NA/EU: March 18, 2010
- Genre(s): Action
- Mode(s): Single-player

Patchwork Heroes, released in Japan as 100 Man-Ton no BaraBara (Note: Japanese: 100万トンのバラバラ, Hepburn: 100 Man-Ton no BaraBara, lit. "A Million Tons of Pieces"), is a 2010 action video game developed by Acquire and Japan Studio and published by Sony Computer Entertainment for the PlayStation Portable.

== Gameplay ==
Similar in genre to Taito's Qix, the goal is to cut the warship into pieces within the time limit displayed on the top part of the screen. Players can cut the warship by holding the circle button while moving. When a warship is cut from one side to the other, the smaller side of the cut falls off of it. This action is repeated until the warship becomes unable to move. (The percentage remaining is displayed in the upper left of the screen).

The timer temporarily stops according to the percentage of the warship that has been cut away. On the warship, there is a gray portion; this can only be destroyed using "mojo", which is gained by cutting off parts of the warship or by using items, to perform a mojo attack (which drains mojo), or by using a bomb in exchange for allies. Mojo attacks cause speed of movement to slow down, but once they are activated, they continue until the gauge runs out. Depending on the bomb item used, the direction of the blast changes. The R button is used to defend against enemy attacks. Sometimes allies are on the warship; touching the prison that the allies are trapped in rescues them. However, if the prison is cut away from the warship without the allies being rescued first, they cannot be saved.The game ends if allies are lost to enemy attacks, if the player is hit by the enemy when there are no allies, or when the player mistakenly enters the range of a bomb blast.

== Plot ==
The story takes place in a world brimming with trees, where civilizations have been replaced time and time again, yet in an age where people have finally begun to live peacefully. People who dug up an ancient civilization's power plant settled near it and created a small town. At the same time, giant warships suddenly began to take movement in various places around the world. Although there is nobody on these warships, they fly as they wish, violently dropping missiles to the ground. One day, one of these warships came to a town in which people lived. Lacking strong weaponry, the townspeople got onto the warships in order to fight. And so, the fight between the town and the warship continued for an outrageously long time.

In the midst of that fight, a single child was rescued from inside of the warship. This child was given the name Titori and raised by the townspeople. The story begins as Titori becomes the leader of the group.
