= Blinx 2: Masters of Time and Space =

2004 video game

- North American cover art
- Developer: Artoon (Note: Supervision and development support provided by Microsoft Game Studios Japan)
- Publisher: Microsoft Game Studios
- Directors: Takuya Matsumoto; Naoto Ohshima
- Producer: Yoji Ishii
- Programmer: Takuya Matsumoto
- Artists: Masamichi Harada; Noriko Omizo
- Writer: Soshi Kawasaki
- Composers: Tomonori Sawada; Keiichi Sugiyama
- Platform: Xbox
- Release: NA: November 16, 2004; JP: November 18, 2004; PAL: December 3, 2004
- Genre: Platform
- Modes: Single-player, multiplayer

Blinx 2: Masters of Time and Space (released in Japan as Blinx 2: Battle of Time and Space) is a platform video game developed by Artoon and published by Microsoft Game Studios for the Xbox. Released in 2004, it is the sequel to Blinx: The Time Sweeper and was the second and final installment of the series. It received mixed reviews from critics. Like the previous installment, it is playable on an Xbox 360 using backwards compatibility.

== Gameplay ==
In Blinx 2, the player switches between playing as the Time Sweepers and the Tom Toms. Much of the core gameplay is retained from the first game for the Time Sweepers, with each Time Sweeper equipped with a vacuum that can collect debris, time crystals, and gold crystals. When shooting debris, the player can now lock onto enemies, a feature planned for the original game. The player no longer needs to collect the crystals in any order to receive a time control, but rather just collect three of a particular crystal. Some of these controls can also be combined, allowing the player to use certain effects with each other, such as speeding themselves up with the fast forward while slowing the world down at the same time. Each Time Sweeper level has multiple missions that the player can choose to do, although only one needs to be completed to progress. The Tom Tom segments are stealth-focused, with the player aiming to collect loot and avoid Time Sweepers. In this mode, the player wields several gadgets that control space, such as decoys and wormholes. They also have guns, which can take out Time Sweepers at risk of attracting attention to themselves. If the player is caught, they must hide, as the Time Sweepers will otherwise quickly defeat them. The story mode can be played in both single-player and in co-op.

Despite being the game titled after Blinx, he only appears during cutscenes. The game instead revolved around two teams of four customizable characters, with a team for the Time Sweepers and a team for the Tom Toms. The player can customize these characters at any time in the hub world for the respective team, with an in-depth set of sliders to alter the character's appearance and various outfits, accessories, emblems, styles and colors to choose from. Versus mode, a new addition to the game, pits the Tom Toms against the Time Sweepers, with up to four players able to join. The time and space controls from the main game are carried over but serve different functions, such as the rewind control now turning the targeted character into an "infant state", making them smaller and weaker. The last team standing wins the match.

A screenshot of the in-game character creator, showing a Time Sweeper and some of the options available to be altered with the sliders.

== Plot ==
The player can choose to play as either members of the Time Sweepers (anthropomorphic cat) or the Tom Toms (pig) on their mission to prevent a threat which will result in a global catastrophe by finding the eight fragments of the all-powerful Big Crystal. Some Tom Tom pigs accidentally destroy the legendary Big Crystal upon discovering it. As a result, the Time Sweepers and the Tom Toms then fight past many time glitch monsters and with each other. Upon completing levels when playing as the Time Sweepers, a short cinematic plays of the mysterious Time Angel, who wants her crystal repaired. At the end of the game, the player's Time Sweepers join with a team which must go to a mysterious part of an alternate universe to defeat the Scissor Demon, a mission from which they cannot return. The team is easily defeated by the demon until a squad of Tom Toms, including the player's custom Tom Toms, arrive. The Tom Toms' leader gives the player's Time Sweeper the other half of the big crystal which enables the player to hurt the Demon. Once the Scissor Demon is defeated, it dissolves. The screen then fades to white, at which point the Angel thanks the Time Sweepers and the Tom-Toms for their efforts.

== Development ==
Blinx: The Time Sweeper was released in 2002 for the Xbox. Microsoft Game Studios Japan had aimed to create a game that appealed to Japanese gamers and even potentially create a mascot for Japan out of titular character Blinx, but they found the game receiving only mixed-to-positive reviews, with it not selling as well as they had hoped in Japan. Despite this, the game sold over 600,000 copies worldwide as of 2004, causing Microsoft to green light a sequel in hopes of releasing a significantly improved product that would make much more of an impact.

Takuya Matsumoto was brought on to co-direct with Naoto Ohshima, director of the original game, due to his significant contributions as main programmer of Blinx and the increased scale of the sequel. Due to the increased workload of creating two individual stories with unique gameplay styles, the development team was split into two for Blinx 2, with one half working on the Time Sweepers and the other half working on the Tom Toms. Directors Matsumoto and Ohshima aimed to create a game with many new features setting it apart from its predecessor; in an interview with Xbox Japan, Matsumoto joked that they had skipped from the second entry of the series to the third as a result of making so many changes. Oshima, in a developer diary for IGN, stated that the game was an answer to critics of the first game, with it doubling in scope from the original. Microsoft had compiled every review, user comment and piece of feedback on the original Blinx, something the developers constantly referenced while developing the sequel. They increased the movement of the Time Sweepers by 1.6 times, and added lock-on when shooting with the vacuum, something planned for the original game but not completed in time for release. The developers also added customisable characters and multiplayer, two things that were not present in the original game. The character of Blinx was redesigned to give him a more "grown-up" appearance, with Blinx's signature sweeper being redesigned to look more like a guitar due to a conversation about guitars between art designer Masamichi Harada and art director Noriko Omizo; the game's overall art style was changed to accommodate this and as a response to complaints the original game's levels were bland in design.

Artoon found difficulty in balancing Blinx 2 so that there was an even amount of attention given to the Tom Toms and the Time Sweepers, and moreso in balancing the two so that there was an even playing field for both sides during competitive multiplayer. The developers continued to test the game even after the bug-fixing stage, in order to help adjust this balance for the final game.

=== Release ===
Blinx 2: Masters of Time and Space was announced in June 2004, with a press announcement calling it "the world's first 5-D game", a play on the previous game's tagline, although this was dropped before release. The game gone gold by November 4, and was released in North America that same month on November 16.

== Reception ==
Reception

Aggregate score
| Aggregator | Score |
|---|---|
| Metacritic | 68/100 |

Review scores
| Publication | Score |
|---|---|
| Edge | 5/10 |
| Electronic Gaming Monthly | 6.67/10 |
| Eurogamer | 6/10 |
| Famitsu | 33/40 |
| Game Informer | 7/10 |
| GamePro | 4.5/5 |
| GameRevolution | C |
| GameSpot | 6.3/10 |
| GameSpy | 2.5/5 |
| GameZone | 8.2/10 |
| IGN | 7.9/10 |
| Official Xbox Magazine (US) | 7.6/10 |
| Detroit Free Press | 2/4 |
| The Sydney Morning Herald | 2.5/5 |

Blinx 2: Masters of Time and Space received "mixed or average" reviews according to the review aggregation website Metacritic. In Japan, Famitsu gave the game a total score of 33 out of 40. In a review of Blinx 2 for IGN, Douglass Perry called it "a solid, if slightly above ordinary, platform game", but said that nothing in the game had a "must-buy" quality to it. Nick Margos, reviewing for GameSpy, said of the game that "for every improvement it's made over its prequel, Blinx 2 introduces an element that seems designed to frustrate and impede your progress". Duke Ferris of GameRevolution explained that poor implementation of new features, designs and music counteract what should have been some interesting additions to an old genre.

Many reviewers complained that Blinx 2 carried over issues from the first game. GameSpot's Alex Navarro stated that the game was much less restrictive and significantly deeper than its predecessor, praising the addition of competitive and co-operative multiplayer, but lamented that it still lacked "captivating" gameplay, or characters that the players could care about. Jason Hill for The Sydney Morning Herald said that while the Time Sweeper sections were improved from the previous game, the Blinx series had failed to capitalise on its potential and the sequel was "another disappointment"; Eurogamer's Ronan Jennings echoed a similar sentiment, stating that while the sequel had improved on the design and controls, the overall game was "just as underwhelming" as the first.

Reviewers noted that, despite the game being titled Blinx 2 and being featured on the box art cover, Blinx himself was only featured on the cover art and in a few cutscenes; custom characters modified through the in-game character creator were playable instead. Gamespot in its review called this the "weirdest thing" about the game. Other reviewers, however, saw this as a positive, with GameZone calling it a "nifty feature", and Eurogamer noting it as "one of a few clever additions" to the game.
