= Feelplus =

Japanese video game developer

Feelplus Inc.
- Native name: 株式会社フィールプラス
- Formerly: Scarab (1992–2005)
- Company type: Subsidiary of AQ Interactive
- Industry: Video games
- Founded: May 1, 1992
- Defunct: 2010
- Fate: Absorbed into AQ Interactive (parent company)
- Headquarters: Tokyo, Japan
- Key people: Nakazato Eiichiro (CEO)
- Products: Games for video game consoles
- Number of employees: 71
- Parent: AQ Interactive

Feelplus Inc. (株式会社フィールプラス Kabushiki gaisha Fiirupurasu) was a Japanese video game developer and a subsidiary of AQ Interactive. The studio was conceived by Microsoft Game Studios specifically to aid Mistwalker in video game development. It was founded by former UPL employees including Tsutomu Fujisawa as Scarab (スカラベ) on May 1, 1992. Former employees of Nautilus and Square Enix later joined in. By September 2002, Cavia (later to become AQ Interactive) bought the company. In May 2005, it became a fully owned subsidiary and Scarab changed its name to Feelplus Inc.

In August 2010, Feelplus Inc., Artoon and Cavia were absorbed into AQ Interactive.

== Games ==
As Scarab

- Survival Arts (1993)
- Dyna Gear (1994)
- Battle Monsters (1995)
- Killing Zone (1996)
- Zen-Nihon Pro Wrestling Featuring Virtua (1997)
- Macross: Do You Remember Love? (1997)
- Fighting Vipers 2 (2001, Dreamcast port)

As Feelplus

- Lost Odyssey (2007), co-developed with Mistwalker
- Infinite Undiscovery (2008) - visual production
- Star Ocean: The Last Hope (2009) - visual production
- Ju-On: The Grudge (2009)
- No More Heroes: Heroes' Paradise (2010)
- Ninety-Nine Nights II (2010), co-developed with Q Entertainment
- MindJack (2011)
- Moon Diver (2011)

== See also ==
- AQ Interactive
- Mistwalker
- Nautilus
