= Echochrome =

2008 video game

echochrome
- Promotional artwork
- Developers: Will; Japan Studio
- Publisher: Sony Computer Entertainment
- Director: Tatsuya Suzuki
- Producer: Masami Yamamoto
- Designers: Satoru Immamura; Kashin Hodotsuka; Ken-ichirou Hatada; Tomokazu Ohki
- Programmers: Takashi Noshiro; Takanori Kikuchi; Kenichiro Obara; Hironori Tsuruya
- Composer: Hideki Sakamoto
- Platforms: PlayStation Portable, PlayStation 3, PlayStation 4
- Release: PlayStation Portable: JP: March 19, 2008; NA: May 1, 2008; AU: July 17, 2008; EU: July 4, 2008; PlayStation 3: NA: May 1, 2008; EU: July 10, 2008; PlayStation 4: JP: June 1, 2022; NA: June 13, 2022
- Genre: Puzzle
- Mode: Single-player

Echochrome (Note: Japanese: 無限回廊, Hepburn: Mugen Kairō; Infinite Corridor) (stylized as echochrome) is a 2008 puzzle video game developed by Will and Japan Studio and published by Sony Computer Entertainment for the PlayStation Portable (PSP). A PlayStation 3 version was released the same year in North America and Europe. The gameplay involves a mannequin figure traversing a rotatable world where physics and reality depend on perspective. The world is occupied by Oscar Reutersvärd's impossible constructions. This concept is inspired by M. C. Escher's artwork, such as "Relativity". The game is based on the Object Locative Environment Coordinate System developed by Jun Fujiki—an engine that determines what is occurring based on the camera's perspective.

Echochrome received a spin-off in 2009 titled Echoshift and a sequel, Echochrome II for the PlayStation 3 utilizing the PlayStation Move in December 2010.

== Gameplay ==
Echochrome requires the player to control a moving character—which resembles an articulated wooden artist's mannequin—to visit, in any order, particular locations on the surfaces of collections of three-dimensional shapes. The objectives are marked by shadows ("echoes") of the moving character. When the last marked position has been visited, one last echo appears, which the player must reach to finish the level: scoring is simply a matter of timing completion of each level (or a course containing several levels).

However, the character cannot be directly controlled by the player: it moves autonomously, following a path along the surface of each shape in a manner that keeps the path's boundary on the character's left (that is, in order of preference, turning left, proceeding straight ahead, turning right, or turning back on itself).

The unique aspect of the game is that the path can be altered merely by rotating the shapes and viewing them from a different perspective: for instance, if a gap or obstacle is obscured, the character will behave as if the path continues behind the object which currently, obscures the gap or obstacle from view. Similarly, if discontinuous shapes or parts of the same shape appear, from the chosen camera angle, to form a continuous path, the character will traverse from one to the other.

Although the character cannot step off the surface of a shape, there are certain points where it may hop off or fall. It then falls downwards to whatever appears to be below it, or off the bottom of the screen to be rematerialized at a previous position. This behavior forms one of the most compelling aspects of the game because the player must deliberately interpret the three-dimensional world as if it were two-dimensional to determine where the character will land.

== Development and release ==
The game was developed primarily by Will, a company located in Saitama. It was produced under Sony's Game Yaroze program, which had previously launched Devil Dice and the Doko Demo Issyo series. The game was first announced at E3 2007. It was released in Japan on March 19, 2008, on UMD and for download on the PlayStation Store, with a demo released on the Japanese PlayStation Network on March 6, 2008. The North American release of Echochrome is only available on the PlayStation Network. A demo was released in North America on April 24, 2008. It was followed by the full version on May 1, 2008. Updates that rotate the set of user-created levels occur periodically.

The game was released as a UMD in Europe on July 4, 2008, with a PlayStation Network version following on July 10. There was an Echochrome inspired arcade mini-game in the Bowling Alley/Game Space of PlayStation Home.

The PlayStation 3 version of the game was released in Japan, North America, and Europe, through the PlayStation Network. All regions feature the basic gameplay with 56 levels. A later update added 1000 user-created levels. PlayStation 3 Trophies were made available for the console version in North America via a patch on December 11, 2008, which features 10 trophies. It includes two gold trophies, one silver trophy, and seven bronze trophies. Europe and Japan have now received the trophy patch.

The PlayStation Portable versions feature different levels from the PlayStation 3 version, with some regions having additional gameplay modes or levels:

- In Japan, the game was released on UMD only. There are 96 levels and three gameplay modes: "solo" (same as the PlayStation three gameplay), "pair", and "others".
- In Europe, a version with identical levels and gameplay was released both on UMD and via the PlayStation Network.
- A different European version called Echochrome Micro was also released on the PlayStation Network. It has the same 96 levels as the full Echochrome game, but only "solo" mode is available.
- In North America, a downloadable PlayStation Network title was released, with no UMD version. This version has only the first 56 levels of Echochrome Micro, with "solo" as the only gameplay mode.
- A DLC pack was released for the North American version, which includes the remaining 40 levels, making it effectively identical to Echochrome Micro.

=== Audio ===
The music of Echochrome was composed by Hideki Sakamoto at the Tokyo-based sound design company Noisycroak. Most songs on the game score consist of a string quartet, including two violins, a viola, and a cello. However, three tracks include operatic vocals by singer Rumiko Kitazono. These are the opening themes to the PlayStation Portable and PlayStation 3 versions of the game, plus an additional theme that is unique to the soundtrack album.

Team Entertainment published the original soundtrack to Echochrome (Note: 無限回廊 オリジナルサウンドトラック, Mugen Kairō Orijinaru Saundotorakku) on May 21, 2008. The performers included Hitoshi Konno (1st violin), Nagisa Kiriyama (2nd violin), Kazuo Watanabe (viola), and Ayano Kasahara (cello). The composer had originally considered naming the game's tracks after philosophical terminology to match the title's abstract qualities, but later decided to use prime numbers so as not to color the songs with subjective interpretations.

== Reception ==
Reception

Aggregate score
Aggregator	Score	
Aggregator	PS3	PSP
Metacritic	81/100	79/100

Review scores
Publication	Score	
Publication	PS3	PSP
The A.V. Club	B+	B+
GameDaily	8/10	8/10
GamePro	4.75	N/A
GameSpot	8/10	7.5/10
GameZone	8/10	8.9/10
IGN	8.6/10	N/A
PALGN	N/A	8/10
Pocket Gamer	N/A	9/10

Echochrome received "generally favorable" reviews according to review aggregator platform Metacritic. The game's minimalistic presentation, originality, and level design were cited as its strongest aspects. In 2008, IGN awarded the game for Best Innovative Design, and nominated it for Best Artistic Design, Best New IP, Best Puzzle.GameSpot nominated the game for Best Original Game Mechanic in their Best of 2008.

== See also ==
- Monument Valley
- The Bridge
