= Away: Shuffle Dungeon =

2008 video game

- North American cover art
- Developers: Artoon; Mistwalker
- Publishers: JP: AQ Interactive; NA: Majesco; EU: V.2 Play
- Director: Masahide Kobayashi
- Producer: Naoto Ohshima
- Artist: Naoto Ohshima
- Writer: Hironobu Sakaguchi
- Composers: Nobuo Uematsu; Yutaka Minobe
- Platform: Nintendo DS
- Release: JP: October 16, 2008; NA: October 29, 2008; EU: April 10, 2009; UK: June 3, 2009
- Genre: Action role-playing
- Modes: Single-player, multiplayer

Away: Shuffle Dungeon (Away(アウェイ) シャッフルダンジョン, Awei Shaffuru Danjon) is an action role-playing game developed by Artoon and Mistwalker for the Nintendo DS. The story involves a curse called "Away", which causes a person to mysteriously vanish from a village each year.

== Gameplay ==
The main gameplay focus of Away is its "shuffle dungeons", where both DS screens show a part of the dungeon for the player to explore in. When a player enters a dungeon, they are given a few seconds to move Sword around both screens before a part of the dungeon starts to shift and reveal a different area for the player to battle monsters and open treasure chests. If a player spends too much time in one of the dungeon's areas, they will be caught in the shuffle and will lose a portion of their HP and start over in the dungeon before the previous one where they got shifted. After reaching the final floor of a dungeon, they will either face a boss or collect gold or items from treasure chests and access a save point. Once the player exits through the way they came from the dungeon, they will be able to use that dungeon again to raise their stats and open chests.

== Development ==
Away: Shuffle Dungeon was co-developed by Artoon and Mistwalker and published in Japan by AQ Interactive. Instead of handing off the western localization to AQ's subsidiary Xseed Games as earlier reported, the game was published in North America by Majesco. AQ Interactive and Virgin Play entered into a partnership for its European release, translating the game into German, English, Spanish, French and Italian.

== Reception ==
Reception

Aggregate score
Aggregator	Score
Metacritic	65/100

Review scores
Publication	Score
1Up.com	B−
Edge	5/10
Famitsu	31/40
Game Informer	7.5/10
GamePro	3/5
GameSpot	5.5/10
GameZone	7.2/10
IGN	6.1/10
Nintendo Power	7/10
RPGamer	2/5
RPGFan	76%
Teletext GameCentral	4/10

The game received "mixed or average" reviews according to the review aggregation website Metacritic. Game Informer gave it a favorable review nearly two months before it was released Stateside. GameSpot said the gameplay was too simple and easy. In Japan, Famitsu gave it a score of two eights, one seven, and one eight for a total of 31 out of 40.
