= Pinobee: Wings of Adventure =

2001 video game

- North American GBA cover art
- Developer: Artoon
- Publisher: Hudson Soft: NA/EU: Activision (GBA)
- Directors: Naoto Ohshima; Yutaka Sugano
- Producer: Yoji Ishii
- Designers: Toshihiko Machita; Yutaka Sugano
- Artist: Masamichi Harada
- Composer: Chikako Kamatani
- Platforms: Game Boy Advance, PlayStation
- Release: Game Boy Advance: JP: March 21, 2001; NA: June 11, 2001; EU: June 22, 2001; PlayStation: JP: September 5, 2002; NA: April 17, 2003; EU: October 10, 2003
- Genre: Platform
- Mode: Single-player

Pinobee: Wings of Adventure, known in Japan as Pinobee no Daibōken (ピノビィーの大冒険, Pinobī no Daibōken; lit. "Pinobee's Great Adventure") or Pinobee: Quest of Heart, is a 2D platformer for the Game Boy Advance, developed by Artoon and published by Hudson Soft. The game was released as a launch title for the system, on March 21, 2001 in Japan and June 11, 2001 in North America. A version was developed for PlayStation in 2002, simply titled Pinobee outside Japan.

A sequel, Pinobee & Phoebee, was released only in Japan in 2002.

== Development ==
Pinobee: Wings of Adventure was developed by Artoon, which was founded by former Sega senior director Yoji Ishii in August 1999 with other ex-Sega staffers such as Yutaka Sugano, Naoto Ohshima, Manabu Kusunoki, and Hidetoshi Takeshita. Sugano, who co-directed and co-designed the game, stated that Ohshima conceived the game as a story that expressed the growth of the human heart. The story about a robotic bee brought to life by a grandfatherly scientist was inspired by the fantasy novel The Adventures of Pinocchio. The game's original main theme was that of the love between a parent and child, but this was eventually toned down. Ishii claimed that the transition from Sega platforms to the GBA and the game's development were smooth due to the handheld's 32-bit CPU and C-based programming. The new GBA hardware presented a unique challenge for the project team and was chosen as the best fit to represent the game's art style. The characters were created using pre-rendered CG models while the backgrounds were hand-drawn. The CG models differed little from their initial concepts, although the antagonists changed from living insects to robots. The game's world map was modeled after the Vincent van Gogh oil painting series Langlois Bridge at Arles.

Leading up to the release of Pinobee, it was shown at Nintendo Space World, the European Computer Trade Show, Jump Festa, and the Tokyo Game Show.

== Release ==
The game was published by Hudson Soft as a launch title for the GBA in Japan on March 21, 2001. A software bug that softlocks the game in two instances was found by consumers shortly thereafter. A workaround for the bug and an apology was posted by Hudson on its official Japanese website on April 11, 2001. Activision struck an overseas distribution deal with Hudson to release Pinobee alongside the GBA in North America and Europe on June 11 and June 22, 2001 respectively. Artoon and Hudson collaborated on a sequel titled Pinobee & Phoebee, released in Japan for the GBA on July 18, 2002. The game gives players the ability to switch between the titular brother-sister duo, each with unique abilities, in search of 20 heart pieces in every stage. Ohshima said Hudson suggested Pinobee could be enjoyable as a PlayStation game and a port of the original game was developed for it. Hudson began advertising both the port of Pinobee and the GBA release of Pinobee & Phoebee (including English language promotional artwork for the sequel) on its North American website in 2002. Konami acquired the distribution rights to the Pinobee series and displayed both games at its E3 booth in May 2002. Hudson released the PlayStation port of Pinobee in Japan in September 2002 while Konami handled distribution for North America and Europe in 2003. Pinobee & Phoebee remained exclusive to Japan.

== Reception ==
Reception

Aggregate scores
| Aggregator | Score | |
| Aggregator | GBA | PS |
|---|---|---|
| GameRankings | 67% | 50% |
| Metacritic | 61/100 | N/A |

Review scores
| Publication | Score | |
| Publication | GBA | PS |
|---|---|---|
| AllGame | 3.5/5 | N/A |
| Edge | 5/10 | N/A |
| Electronic Gaming Monthly | 6.5/10 | N/A |
| Famitsu | 7/10, 6/10, 6/10, 6/10 | 27/40 |
| Game Informer | 8/10 | N/A |
| GameSpot | 5.4/10 | N/A |
| GameSpy | 65% | N/A |
| IGN | 6/10 | N/A |
| Next Generation | 3/5 | N/A |
| Nintendo Power | 4/5 | N/A |
| Nintendo World Report | 6/10 | N/A |
| Official U.S. PlayStation Magazine | N/A | 2/5 |

The Game Boy Advance version received "mixed" reviews according to the review aggregation website Metacritic. NextGen called it "A cute but ultimately underachieving entry in an already crowded market." In Japan, Famitsu gave it a score of 25 out of 40 for the GBA original, and 27 out of 40 for the PlayStation version.
