= Sneakers (2002 video game) =

- North American Xbox cover art
- Developers: Media.Vision; Microsoft Game Studios Japan
- Publisher: Microsoft Game Studios
- Platform: Xbox
- Release: JP: February 22, 2002; NA: October 22, 2002
- Genres: Action, Puzzle
- Mode: Single-player

Sneakers, released in Japan as Nezmix: Have A Mice Day! (Japanese: ねずみくす, Hepburn: Nezumikusu), is a video game developed by Media.Vision in partnership with Microsoft Game Studios Japan exclusively for the Xbox in 2002. Sneakers is an action-puzzle game in which the player leads a group of mice to explore a house and its surroundings to detect enemy rats and protect their group in beat 'em up fights. Marketed as making use of 'fur shading' graphics, the design of the mice in Sneakers was intended to showcase the technical capabilities of the Xbox. The game was developed as one of two Japan-exclusive launch titles for the Xbox, and was later released in North America in an exclusive distribution with Toys R Us retail stores. Upon release in Japan, Nezmix sold poorly, with critics attributing the release to contributing to the poor launch of the console in the country. The North American version of Sneakers received generally unfavorable reviews, with criticism directed at the game's linear and repetitive gameplay.

== Gameplay ==
A screenshot of gameplay in Sneakers.

In Sneakers, the player leads a group of mice to locate and battle with four squads of enemies in a stage. Gameplay in Sneakers takes place across two phases. In the 'search phase', the player moves in a linear direction around various areas to hunt for enemies within a time limit. Players are able to choose a direction at certain points where their path splits, and can climb and jump across certain gaps. Navigation is assisted by the game's stage map, which allows players to identify visited and unvisited areas and the location and number of enemy squads. When the player identifies an enemy scout is nearby, the player can press a button to enter the 'check mode' to move a cursor with the thumbstick to select a scout or interact with items a scout is hiding in to reveal them. The player may encounter obstacles that prevent them from moving, requiring them to interact with items or solve puzzles to progress.

Once the player has located all the scouts from an enemy squad in an area, the player can navigate to a battlefield area to enter the 'battle phase'. In this phase, the player leads a squad of mice to defeat the enemy squad in beat 'em up combat, using a series of skills including punches, kicks and blocks. Players have a limited amount of lives and health that can be replenished by food. Players can issue commands to friendly mice using 'command mode' to task them to collect food or other items. When a player defeats the squad in a stage, they then face a boss. Upon completing the stage, the player receives a 'stage grade' for their performance from A to E, with factors such as the time limit, number of enemies defeated, items collected and surviving friendly mice influencing the grade.

== Plot ==
In Sneakers, the player takes on the role of a mouse named Apollo, a mouse living in the attic of a small house on a river in Paris. Apollo and his friends, Bonnie, Brutus, Watt, Pete and Tiki are planning a celebration alongside the humans living in the house, who are having a party in a local park. After collecting scraps of food for the festivities, the mice discover that the local rats have stolen their food. Unlike the mice, the rats are hostile and unfriendly. Bosses of rats have organised and amassed the other rats, known as bully rats, into packs. In the midst of the chaos, Bonnie discovers that her brother Tiki is missing, and disappears to search for her. Aided by his friends, the player's goal is to find and eliminate the squads rats across five levels, spanning a house, alley, park, cellar and bridge, and rescue the missing mice.

== Development and release ==
Sneakers, initially released in Japan as Nezmix, was developed by Japanese studio Media Vision, who had previously released titles under the Wild Arms and Crime Crackers series of video games. The developers originally conceived the game to depict a cartoon or picture book theme, but pursued experimentation with a realistic visual style after attending a demonstration of 'fur shading' techniques at SIGGRAPH, and intended to showcase the graphical capabilities of the Xbox. Nezmix was announced at the Tokyo Game Show in partnership with Microsoft's Japanese division in October 2001 in anticipation of the Japanese launch of the Xbox. The game was published by Microsoft Game Studios as a launch title for the console, at the time being one of two releases exclusive to Japan alongside Nobunaga's Ambition: Chronicles of Turbulent Times. Upon its initial release in Japan, Nezmix performed poorly, selling over 8,000 units at launch. Critics noted that the commercial failure of the game was reflective of the poor performance of the launch of the Xbox in Japan. Describing the launch as a "disappointment", Game Developer Magazine noted that "none of the games designed specifically for Japanese gamers, such as Sneakers, have made a big impact. Edge attributed the dismal launch to the decision by Microsoft to select Sneakers as a launch title over the more successful Halo: Combat Evolved, citing the game's failure as due to its "lacklustre animation" and departure from the kawaii design preferred by Japanese audiences.

Microsoft Game Studios announced that Nezmix would be released as Sneakers in North America, and showcased the game at E3 in May 2002. Pre-release reception of the game was mixed. IGN described the game's demo as "wretchedly boring" and "animated poorly", writing the game "doesn't even attempt to flex the Xbox muscle." In a more positive preview, GameSpot praised the title as a "nice-looking game" due to its fur rendering system and "exquisite" environmental textures, although hoped future development would "transcend the limitations placed on it by the lack of wholly free movement". Sneakers was released in North America as an exclusive distribution deal with Toys R Us stores, with the method of distribution viewed as an ominous portent of the game's quality. Xbox Magazine described the game as a "risky release" and noted that "the fact Microsoft was cautious about releasing this over here warrants some concern." Similarly, Electronic Gaming Monthly remarked "if you were Microsoft, would you release a game you thought was any good to one chain of stores? Didn't think so."

== Reception ==
Reception

Aggregate score
Aggregator	Score
Metacritic	28/100

Review scores
Publication	Score
AllGame	1/5
Edge	2/10
Famitsu	22/40
GameSpot	3/10
GameSpy	1.5/5
IGN	2/10
Official Xbox Magazine (US)	4.9/10
TeamXbox	3.1/10
Xbox Nation (XBN)	3/10

The game received "generally unfavorable" to negative reviews according to the review aggregation website Metacritic. Many critics noted the game's easy and simplistic mechanics and limited variety. GameSpot reflected that the modes of gameplay were "neither challenging or compelling", with the game "beaten in two hours or less". Xbox Nation wrote "the specific challenges...are easy enough to accomplish; individual rats can be targeted and dispatched simply by shifting to a first-person view, putting a cursor over the foe and pressing a button". Describing the game as "limited and simplistic", Allgame noted that the "objectives remain the same in each of the five areas".

Several reviewers also critiqued the game's linearity and limited level of exploration and interaction. Describing the gameplay as "an interesting concept but limited in practice", Official Xbox Magazine found the game's movement to be "restrictive in exploration" due to the game's "rigid track". Edge noted the game contained "no freedom", writing that whilst "junctions afford a choice of route...the implied non-linearity is utterly superficial" due to the requirement to explore all areas. Finding the game to be "poorly designed" and "irritating", Allgame wrote that the game's navigation was "confusing to the point where players are in relation to the door leading to the next room", noting that "interacting with the environment is non-existent".

Reviewers also expressed disappointment in the game's graphics and touted use of 'fur shading'. IGN described the shading as "a poor example of what (the) Xbox can do visually" and critiqued the game's low frame rate. GameSpot remarked that the shading "looks cheap and inconsistent, and draws attention to the simplicity of the character models". Allgame critiqued the game's animations, writing that "walking is funny looking, as each rodent moves with approximately two frames of animation." However, GameSpy praised the game's "clear and colourful" environments and found the fur shading to make the mice "fuzzy and pet-able". Xbox Nation found the game's puzzles to be "not so puzzling" and "add little depth to an otherwise very shallow children's game."
