= Hideki Sakamoto =

Japanese composer

- 坂本 英城
- Born: Japan
- Education: Waseda University
- Occupation: Composer
- Years active: 1998–present
- Organization: Noisycroak
- Musical career
- Genre: Video game music
- Website: hideki-sakamoto.com

Hideki Sakamoto (坂本 英城, Sakamoto Hideki) is a Japanese music composer, best known for his contributions in video games. He serves as the representative director of Noisycroak, a Tokyo-based sound design company focused on game soundtracks. Echochrome II holds the Guinness World Record for the longest single musical track in a video game, lasting 75 minutes and 7 seconds.

== Early life and education ==
Sakamoto started playing classical piano at the age of 4. He graduated from Waseda University in 2004.

== Works ==
Year	Game	Notes	Ref.
2005	Shinobido: Way of the Ninja	with Keisuke Ito	
2006	Bomberman	with Keisuke Ito	
2006	Yakuza 2	with several others	
2007	Pokémon Mystery Dungeon: Explorers of Time and Explorers of Darkness	with several others	
2008	Ryū ga Gotoku Kenzan!	with several others	
2008	Echochrome		
2008	Aquanaut's Holiday: Hidden Memories		
2008	Castlevania Judgment	music director	
2009	428: Shibuya Scramble	with Naoki Satō and Shingo Yasumoto	
2009	Yakuza 3	with several others	
2009	Pokémon Mystery Dungeon: Explorers of Sky		
2010	Echochrome II		
2010	Patchwork Heroes		
2012	Time Travelers		
2013	Attack of the Friday Monsters! A Tokyo Tale		
2013	Toukiden		
2014	Super Smash Bros. for Nintendo 3DS and Wii U	arrangements	
2015	Kakuriyo no Mon	with several others	
2015	Hakuōki: Shinkai - Furi no Shou		
2015	Monster Strike		
2016	Fortune Tellers Academy		
2016	TumeTume Lord		
2016	Kumapara		
2018	Super Smash Bros. Ultimate	main theme "Lifelight"	
2020	Project Dreams: How to Build Mazinger Z's Hangar		
2021	Neptunia x Senran Kagura: Ninja Wars		
2022	Altair Breaker		
2023	Takt Op. Symphony		
2024	Mario & Luigi: Brothership		
