= N.U.D.E.@ Natural Ultimate Digital Experiment =

2003 video game

- Developers: Microsoft Game Studios Japan; Red Entertainment
- Publisher: Microsoft Game Studios
- Platform: Xbox
- Release: JP: 24 April 2003
- Genre: Life simulation
- Mode: Single-player

N.U.D.E.@ Natural Ultimate Digital Experiment is a life simulation video game developed by Microsoft Game Studios Japan and Red Entertainment, released exclusively for the Xbox in Japan by Microsoft Game Studios. In this simulation-style game, the player assumes the role of tester for a new product: a female humanoid robot called P.A.S.S. (Personal Assist Secretary System). The robot starts with minimal functionality and must be taught language and tasks by the player. This is achieved through voice commands issued using the included headset, the Xbox Communicator.

The game incorporates the Xbox's internal clock to track time, which influences gameplay in various ways. Its concept is similar to the Sega Dreamcast game Seaman, where the player interacts with an avatar via voice.

N.U.D.E.@ Natural Ultimate Digital Experiment was announced on 19 September, 2002, and a promotional video was showcased at the 2002 Tokyo Game Show.

== Critical reception ==
Anoop Gantayat in an article for IGN criticized the game, finding it often hard to navigate, and stating that while bad games could often be fun, he found no enjoyment in the title, suggesting it would have been better if it had actual nudity instead. He further stated that while P.A.S.S. was a cute and well designed robot, she was slightly scary in how she would at times just stare at the player when interacting with them, and felt she was not nearly as memorable as the protagonist of the game Seaman, citing by comparison how Japanese audiences recognized that character from the voice alone.

Character designer and freelance artist Tomoharu Saito in an article for Japanese magazine Game Hihyou stated that while he was disappointed in the progress humanity had made with robotics in the 21st century, particularly humanoid robotics, he recognized that eroticism often played a role in creativity and science, and mused that "automatic sex dolls" would likely be the first true innovation in that regard for it to progress. He observed P.A.S.S. in this regard, and saw her situation as akin to the plot of My Fair Lady, in how the player finds happiness by shaping her personality with their input, and the mythological Pygmalion while acknowledging the pitfalls in falling in love with an artificial intelligence.
