= Vampire Rain =

2007 video game

- Developer: Artoon
- Publishers: AQ Interactive (Xbox 360); Ignition Entertainment (PS3)
- Director: Shigeru Okada
- Producer: Naoto Ohshima
- Writer: Soshi Kawasaki
- Composers: Hideaki Miyamoto; Masatoshi Moriwaki
- Platforms: Xbox 360, PlayStation 3
- Release: Xbox 360: JP: January 25, 2007; EU: June 29, 2007; NA: July 3, 2007; PlayStation 3: JP: August 21, 2008; NA: September 2, 2008; EU: September 26, 2008; AU: October 6, 2008
- Genres: Survival horror, stealth
- Modes: Single-player, multiplayer

Vampire Rain (ヴァンパイアレイン, Vanpaia Rein) is a survival horror stealth video game developed by Artoon. It was released for the Xbox 360 in Japan on January 25, 2007, and in North America on July 3, 2007. The game was later ported to the PlayStation 3 in 2008 under the title Vampire Rain: Altered Species (ヴァンパイアレイン：アルタードスピーシーズ, Vanpaia Rein: Arutādo Supīshīzu). It received negative reviews for its difficulty, poor artificial intelligence, and controls.

== Plot ==
Vampires, known as "nightwalkers", were found to be responsible for the disappearances of civilians in the United States and in other countries. The American Information Bureau (AIB) raises a black ops special forces unit, which is deployed to the streets of Los Angeles.

Throughout the game, John Lloyd is haunted by the vision of a young girl, whom he saved in a previous mission when nightwalkers launched a raid on the Office of Disease Control (ODC). Their attack killed almost all the ODC personnel and special forces operators sent to secure/retake the ODC building. Eventually he finds out that his team leader has also seen her.

Later on it is revealed that the AIB, acting of their own accord, plan for America to enter full-scale war against the Nightwalkers. They send their own human/nightwalker hybrids to kill Lloyd's group to get rid of the evidence, and send the rest of their forces against the Nightwalkers' headquarters in the city. Lloyd defeats all the hybrids and vampires in his way, eventually meeting with the leader of the vampires in an attempt to keep the peace. Unfortunately, the leader also wants full-scale war against the humans, and plans to change the whole city into nightwalkers. Lloyd is forced to fight and defeat him.

It turns out the head vampire wasn't really the true leader of nightwalkers in the city, as he was advised by two nightwalkers who were naturally born as vampires and can survive in the daytime. Lloyd fights and kills the first. The second doesn't resist and offers Lloyd the choice to kill him or not, claiming that the future of the nightwalker race will soon be revealed.

After Lloyd has left the final battle, if he chose to end him the haunting young girl appears. She pours blood onto the ashes of the leader, and he is resurrected. If Lloyd chose not to kill him the lamenting leader vacates the premises only for the little girl to appear beside him and they walk off together.

== Gameplay ==
John Lloyd uses a ultraviolet-based combat knife to kill a nightwalker from the back.

Vampire Rain is a stealth game similar in nature to the Splinter Cell or Metal Gear series. Players are tasked with navigating their character through city streets, while avoiding the vampire enemies that patrol the streets disguised as ordinary human citizens. Players often have to take alternate routes, such as climbing onto rooftops or through alleys, to avoid enemy encounters. The only way to effectively fight them is through situations where the players can fight a nightwalker in a 1:1 scenario.

Unlike most stealth-action games, Vampire Rain places heavy emphasis on pure stealth. Enemies are extremely fast and can kill the player in two hits; the first hit usually immobilizes the player, giving the vampire sufficient time to land a second, killing blow. Additionally, for the first third of the game, players lack any weaponry that can kill vampires effectively without spending a large amount of ammunition. In effect, most attempts to initiate combat generally result in the player's death. Also, unlike most stealth games, there is usually no effective means to hide or escape once an enemy has spotted the player, which results in the player dying soon after being spotted. Successful completion of many missions thus generally requires total avoidance of enemies by figuring out the correct route to pass through the mission area without being detected.

Later in the game, players are given high-powered weapons which prove more effective against the game's vampire enemies. Also, there are a few pre-scripted action sequences that involve fighting against multiple enemies, generally with the assistance of teammates or special environmental hazards. The player's arsenal includes a handgun, submachine gun, assault rifle, shotgun, sniper rifle, anti-armor rifle and a UV Knife used to stab an enemy from behind for an instant kill. Necrovision gear is used to tell nightwalkers from ordinary humans. Killing a human by mistake will result in a game over.

If the player collects enough "Medals" that are either placed in hidden or difficult to reach spots throughout the game as well as passing certain missions under certain conditions such as within a time-limit, without needing to retry from a checkpoint or without killing any Nightwalkers will reward the player with extra side-missions and challenges.

Online multiplayer involves up to eight players in standard modes such as deathmatch, team deathmatch and capture the flag (named "Capture the Flame" in-game), as well as the unique mode which allows one to become a nightwalker and fight opponents with extreme speed and power. All the firearms are available online and the gameplay is handled like in single-player.

== Development ==
In November 2006, AQ Interactive announced an early purchase bonus of a clip for anyone who preorders the game. AQ Interactive held a promotional event on January 2007 in Nihonbashi, Akihabara and Osaka where participants are given game-based clear file folders for free.

In February 2007, AQ Interactive reported the launch of two demo stages through Xbox Live Marketplace for free.

In an IGN interview in May 2012, Naoto Ohshima, President of Artoon and game producer, says that rain serves as the motif. It also serves as the weakness for nightwalkers, allowing players to sneak around or kill them effectively.

== Reception ==
Reception

Aggregate score
Aggregator	Score	
Aggregator	PS3	Xbox 360
Metacritic	30/100	38/100

Review scores
Publication	Score	
Publication	PS3	Xbox 360
The A.V. Club	N/A	C
Edge	N/A	5/10
Eurogamer	N/A	3/10
Famitsu	N/A	30/40
Game Informer	N/A	3/10
GameDaily	2/10	N/A
GamePro	N/A	1.75/5
GameRevolution	N/A	D+
GameSpot	3.5/10	3.5/10
GameTrailers	N/A	3.6/10
GameZone	2.5/10	4/10
Hardcore Gamer	N/A	1/5
IGN	3/10	2.9/10
Official Xbox Magazine (US)	N/A	3.5/10
411Mania	N/A	1.5/10

The game received "generally unfavorable" reviews on both platforms according to the review aggregation website Metacritic.

The reviews criticized Vampire Rain's enemy AI, controls, health meters for both the protagonist and enemies, and multiplayer modes. The game was also criticized for having elements derived from Metal Gear Solid and Splinter Cell but with much less appeal. The game was criticized for being too hard and for the linear level design. However, the game was complimented for its eerie music. Vampire Rain: Altered Species was also poorly received. A GameSpot review admonished the updated PS3 version for not undergoing major changes from the Xbox 360 version. IGN called the Altered Species game "a trainwreck".

In Japan, however, the Xbox 360 version was better received, with Famitsu and Famitsu X360 each granting it a score of 30 out of 40.
