= Killing Zone =

1996 video game

- US cover art
- Developer: Scarab
- Publishers: JP: Naxat Soft; NA/PAL: Acclaim Entertainment
- Director: Norio Yamazaki
- Producers: Hiroshi Shimoji; Tsutomu Fuzisawa
- Platform: PlayStation
- Release: JP: March 29, 1996; NA: July 1996; PAL: September 1996
- Genre: Fighting
- Modes: Single-player, Multiplayer

Killing Zone is a fighting video game developed by Scarab and published by Naxat Soft in March 1996 in Japan and by Acclaim in both July 1996 in North America, and September 1996 in Europe and Oceania, for the PlayStation. The game was met with a poor critical reception.

== Gameplay ==
In this videogame, there are a total of 14 characters in the game, and two modes: Normal Mode which is a standard fighting game mode, and Auto Mode. In Auto mode the player selects a type of monster, making their own version of one of the seven playable characters. Auto mode comprises three tournaments, during which the player can upgrade their monster by winning battles. Unlike the 2D digitized actors and platforms of its predecessor, the gameplay is more like Virtua Fighter in terms of 3D characters, move sets and ring outs.

== Development ==
The development team's more ambitious unrealized plans for the game included allowing characters to dismember their opponents during fights.

== Critical reception ==
Reception

Review scores
Publication	Score
AllGame	1.5/5
IGN	2/10
Next Generation	1/5

Killing Zone received mostly negative reviews. Next Generation panned it, citing animation "among the worst we've seen", counter-intuitive controls, disorienting camera movements, poor enemy AI, and overpowered enemies. They remarked that "To call this game frustrating is to give the most unbearably frustrating games a bad name." The game was deemed "awful" by IGN, who repeated nearly all of Next Generation's points.

== Legacy ==
In October 2018, the game's rights were acquired by Canadian production company Liquid Media Group along with other titles originally owned by Acclaim Entertainment.

== See also ==
- List of fighting games
