= FlingSmash =

2010 video game for the Nintendo Wii

- Developer: Artoon
- Publisher: Nintendo
- Director: Hidetoshi Takeshita
- Producers: Yutaka Sugano; Toyokazu Nonaka
- Artist: Manabu Kusunoki
- Composers: Mariko Nanba; Yutaka Minobe
- Platform: Wii
- Release: NA: November 7, 2010; JP: November 18, 2010; EU: November 19, 2010
- Genre: Action
- Modes: Single-player, multiplayer

FlingSmash (Note: Known in Japan as Striking Bounce: Super Smash Ball Plus (Japanese: たたいて弾む スーパースマッシュボール・プラス, Hepburn: Tataite Hazumu Sūpā Sumasshu Bōru Purasu)) is an action video game developed by Artoon and published by Nintendo for the Wii. The game requires the use of the Wii MotionPlus peripheral. Nintendo introduced the Wii Remote Plus, a variation of the Wii Remote with features of the MotionPlus, which is bundled with the game. It was revealed in June 2009 as Span Smasher and was released in November 2010 as FlingSmash in North America, Europe, and Japan. The game borrows heavily from the paddleball concept and consists of players using the Wii Remote to hit the character, Zip, towards obstacles and collectable items.

== Plot ==
The game is set on the fictional Suthon Island. It is said to hold the power to protect the world from harm, which was protected by a large palm tree and watched over by the nature spirits in the island. Before the game, the antagonist, Omminus, takes over the island in order to rule the world. As a result, the palm tree begins to wither and the princess becomes ill. The leader of the nature spirits recalls an old legend about a hero using sacred pearls to restore the peace. He finds the treasure chest where the hero, Zip, resides. Zip, and a friend from the neighboring Eesturn Island, Pip, set out to retrieve the pearls and defeat Omminus.

== Gameplay ==
=== Worlds and stages ===
The game consists of eight worlds, each of which consists of three levels, plus a boss fight. In each level, the screen will scroll constantly in one direction. The direction depends on the stage and Wii Remote Hand. Players must collect a pearl to complete the level. To collect a pearl, players will need to find three medals. Medals are hidden within each stage, and are sometimes carried by enemies that the player must hit. If the player falls back to the edge of the screen for too long, he/she will get eaten by Hydracoil, and will lose a life. If the player loses all of his/her lives, the game is over. If the players collects a pearl in all three levels, a boss stage is unlocked in each world. The world is cleared after the player beats the boss.

=== Mini-games ===
If the player gets an A ranking in all three stages of a specific world, a mini-game option will appear on the world's selection screen. Each mini-game shows instructions on how to play it. If playing with a friend, players will see a gold icon for a competitive game and a blue icon for cooperative play.

== Reception ==
Reception

Aggregate scores
Aggregator	Score
GameRankings	55%
Metacritic	48/100

Review scores
Publication	Score
G4	4/5
Game Informer	7/10
GamesRadar+	6/10
IGN	4/10

FlingSmash received "generally unfavorable" reviews, according to Metacritic, receiving a score of 48/100.
