= Artoon =

Japanese video game developer

Artoon Co., Ltd. 株式会社アートゥーン
- Company type: Subsidiary
- Industry: Video games
- Founded: August 27, 1999
- Founder: Naoto Ohshima; Yoji Ishii
- Defunct: c. 2010
- Fate: Absorbed into AQ Interactive
- Successor: Arzest
- Headquarters: Yokohama, Japan
- Key people: Naoto Ohshima (president and CEO); Yoji Ishii (chairman)
- Number of employees: 85
- Parent: AQ Interactive

Artoon Co., Ltd. (株式会社アートゥーン Kabushiki-Gaisha Ātūn) was a Japanese video game developer established in 1999 by former Sega members, namely Naoto Ohshima and Yoji Ishii. The studio was primarily affiliated in the United States with projects on Microsoft's Xbox and Xbox 360, although they had also worked with Hudson Soft and Nintendo on other platforms.

Artoon was situated in Yokohama, Kanagawa, with a secondary office in Naha, Okinawa. It became a subsidiary of AQ Interactive in May 2004, and was fully acquired in June 2005. Around 2010, Artoon, along with AQ's other development studios Feelplus and Cavia, were absorbed into AQ.

== Overview ==
=== Early years (1999-2004) ===
Artoon was founded on August 27, 1999 by Yoji Ishii, along with Naoto Ohshima, both of whom had left Sega the previous year. Additional ex-Sega staff joining Artoon included Manabu Kusunoki, Hidetoshi Takeshita, Yutaka Sugano, Masamichi Harada, and Takuya Matsumoto. Most of the Sega members hailed from Sonic Team, but a few (like Kusunoki) also worked on the Panzer Dragoon series at Team Andromeda. The studio's name was taken from the word "cartoon". Throughout its life, Artoon employed approximately 85 people. Artoon's first game was Pinobee: Wings of Adventure, released by Hudson Soft in 2001.

When the Xbox launched in Japan in February 2002, Artoon was one of the developers chosen by Microsoft, who began seeking Japanese developers in an attempt to gain a foothold in the market by creating games to appeal to the Japanese market. The end result was Blinx: The Time Sweeper, released in Japan on December 12, 2002.

=== AQ Interactive and later projects (2004-2010) ===
Artoon was acquired by publisher AQ Interactive in May 2004 and became a subsidiary. Artoon was fully acquired by AQ in June 2005 and became a wholly-owned subsidiary alongside developers Feelplus and Cavia. In the process, Artoon co-founder Ishii moved to AQ to become its President and CEO. Some of Artoon's later games would be published in Japan by AQ.

Artoon collaborated with Hironobu Sakaguchi's Mistwalker to develop Blue Dragon, an Xbox 360 title on which Artoon did much of the work. Around the same time, it collaborated with Nintendo again to develop Yoshi's Island DS.

In its final years, the studio collaborated with Sony Computer Entertainment on Echoshift, and Disney Interactive Studios on Club Penguin: Game Day!

In June 2010, Yoji Ishii stepped down from AQ Interactive. Around the same time, Artoon, along with Feelplus and Cavia, were all absorbed into AQ. Artoon's final game was FlingSmash, released in 2010.

Around the same time as Artoon's dissolution, Ohshima, Ishii, and the remaining staff formed a new studio, Arzest, based in Artoon's former offices.

== Games developed ==
Year	Title	Publisher(s)	Platform(s)
2001	Pinobee: Wings of Adventure	Hudson Soft	Game Boy Advance, PlayStation
2002	The King of Fighters EX: Neo-Blood	Hudson Soft	Game Boy Advance
2002	Ghost Vibration	Eidos Japan; Infogrames Europe	PlayStation 2
2002	Pinobee and Phoebee	Hudson Soft	Game Boy Advance
2002	Ghost Trap	Eidos Interactive	Game Boy Advance
2002	Blinx: The Time Sweeper	Microsoft Game Studios	Xbox
2004	Blinx 2: Masters of Time and Space	Microsoft Game Studios	Xbox
2004	Yoshi Topsy-Turvy	Nintendo	Game Boy Advance
2005	Swords of Destiny	Marvelous Entertainment	PlayStation 2
2006	Blue Dragon	Microsoft Game Studios	Xbox 360
2007	Vampire Rain	AQ Interactive	Xbox 360, PlayStation 3
2007	Yoshi's Island DS	Nintendo	Nintendo DS
2008	The World of Golden Eggs: Nori Nori Rhythm-kei	AQ Interactive	Wii
2008	Away: Shuffle Dungeon	AQ Interactive	Nintendo DS
2009	The World of Golden Eggs: Nori Nori Uta Dekichatte Kei	AQ Interactive	Nintendo DS
2009	Echoshift	Sony Computer Entertainment	PlayStation Portable
2010	Club Penguin: Game Day!	Disney Interactive Studios	Wii
2010	FlingSmash	Nintendo	Wii
2011	The Last Story	Nintendo	Wii

== See also ==
- Arzest
