= Echoshift =

2009 video game

- Promotional artwork
- Developers: Artoon; Japan Studio
- Publisher: Sony Computer Entertainment
- Director: Takamichi Niita
- Producer: Naoto Ohshima
- Designer: Ryo Sato
- Artist: Koki Mogi
- Composer: Yutaka Minobe
- Platform: PlayStation Portable
- Release: JP: November 1, 2009; WW: February 25, 2010
- Genre: Puzzle
- Mode: Single-player

Echoshift (Note: Japanese: 時限回廊, Hepburn: Jigen Kairō; Timed Corridor) (stylised as echoshift) is a 2009 puzzle video game developed by Artoon and Japan Studio and published by Sony Computer Entertainment for the PlayStation Portable. The game uses events known as "Time Bounces" in which a small section of time repeats itself over and over again. By exploiting time bounces, the player can overcome various obstacles that would have been otherwise impossible to navigate. The game is a spinoff of the Echochrome series.

This game was re-released on the PlayStation Store for the PlayStation 4 and PlayStation 5's Classics Catalog on July 19, 2022.

== Gameplay ==
The player controls a small stick-like figure who can walk, go up and down stairs, and press switches. The object of each level in the game is to move this stick figure from the entrance door to the exit door. There are multiple obstacles that the player must overcome to get to the exit door, including moving platforms, spiked blocks, and pressure-sensitive bridges. The player is given a set amount of time to traverse the level, but each level is set up to be impossible to complete in just one playthrough. This is how time bounces come into play. Each time the player moves through the level a recording of their actions is created. When time bounces, the player plays through the same level again, but alongside the recording of what they did in the previous playthrough. This recording is known as an "echo" and appears as a shadow of the player. By cooperating with these echoes of the players past actions, the player can successfully get to the end of the level. A series of additional levels were released as downloadable content.

== Reception ==
Reception

Aggregate score
| Aggregator | Score |
|---|---|
| Metacritic | (PSP) 75/100 |

The game received positive reviews. It has a combined Metacritic score of 75% for the PlayStation Portable.

IGN gave it an 8.5 out of 10 saying that it "improved in nearly every way over its predecessor".
