= AQ Interactive =

Defunct Japanese video game developer

AQ Interactive, Inc.
- Native name: 株式会社AQインタラクティブ
- Type: Kabushiki gaisha
- Industry: Video games
- Founded: October 1, 2005; 20 years ago
- Defunct: October 5, 2011; 14 years ago
- Fate: Merged with Marvelous Entertainment and Liveware
- Successor: Marvelous AQL
- Headquarters: Tokyo, Japan
- Key people: Shuichi Motoda, CEO
- Number of employees: 393 (as of March 2010)
- Subsidiaries: Refer to subsidiary
- Website: www.aqi.co.jp

AQ Interactive, Inc. was a Japanese video game developer and publisher. AQ stands for Artistic Quality. It was the parent company of the developers Artoon, Cavia and feelplus, and most recently the U.S. publisher Xseed Games. AQ Interactive and its subsidiaries produced games both under the AQ Interactive name, as well as developing for other publishers such as Microsoft Studios (now Xbox Game Studios) and Nintendo.

== History ==
AQ Interactive was founded on October 1, 2005, when Cavia, established on March 1, 2000, changed its name and became a holding company responsible for the management of subsidiary companies as well as sales and promotion of video game software. The old company's game planning & development business became Cavia Inc. which remained a subsidiary of AQI, until July 2010, when Cavia was re-absorbed as a part of AQI.

It published its first game in November 2005, the Xbox 360 launch title Tetris: The Grand Master ACE.

On March 12, 2009, AQ Interactive, Inc. announced relocating its headquarters to Shinagawa, Tokyo, between June and August 2009.

On March 26, 2009, AQ Interactive, Inc. announced the establishment of its mobile contents and overseas business divisions, effective on April 1, 2009.

In August 2010, AQ Interactive merged and relocated the Artoon, feelplus, Cavia web sites into a single AQI Development product page.

On March 31, 2011, AQ Interactive, Inc. announced merging its software and amusement business departments into consumer business department.

On June 23, 2011, AQ Interactive, Inc. announced its merger with Marvelous Entertainment and Liveware, effective on October 1, 2011.

== Subsidiaries ==
- XSEED JKS, Inc.: On May 15, 2007, AQ Interactive, Inc. announced the acquisition of XSEED JKS, Inc., with share transfer before June 2007. On May 1, 2009, AQ Interactive, Inc. announced increasing its stake of XSEED JKS, Inc. from 55.0% (486636 shares) to 90.0% (766859 shares) on the day of announcement.
- LINKTHINK Inc. (株式会社リンクシンク): On April 16, 2009, AQ Interactive, Inc. announced the acquisition of LINKTHINK Inc., effective on April 16, 2009. AQ Interactive, Inc. would own 66.8% stake (1030 shares) of the subsidiary. On November 6, 2009, AQ Interactive, Inc. announced increasing its stake of LINKTHINK Inc. to 100% (1540 shares).

=== Former subsidiaries ===
- Microcabin Corporation (株式会社マイクロキャビン): On 2008-05-09, AQ Interactive, Inc. announced the acquisition of Microcabin Corporation via share purchase, with trade on May 16, 2008. On January 14, 2011, AQ Interactive, Inc. announced selling its 85% stake (312704 shares) of Microcabin Corporation to Fields Corporation (フィールズ株式会社), and Microcabin Corporation became a consolidated subsidiary of Fields Corporation.
- feelplus Inc. (株式会社フィールプラス): A carryover subsidiary of cavia inc. On April 28, 2011, AQ Interactive, Inc. announced merging feelplus Inc. into AQ Interactive, Inc., effective on August 1, 2011.
- Cavia Inc. (株式会社キャビア): On April 28, 2011, AQ Interactive, Inc. announced merging Cavia Inc. into AQ Interactive, Inc., effective on August 1, 2011.
- Artoon (株式会社アートゥーン): On April 28, 2011, AQ Interactive, Inc. announced merging Artoon into AQ Interactive, Inc., effective on August 1, 2011.

== Released games ==
The following are games developed and/or published by AQ Interactive.

=== Arcade ===
- Pokémon Battrio (2007): Fighting
- Higurashi no Naku Koro ni Jong (Higurashi When They Cry characters mahjong video game) (2009) : Mahjong
- Touch the Numbers (TBA)
- Cubemall: UFO catcher
- Minna de Derby: Horse racing

=== PlayStation 2 ===
- Love Com (2006): Adventure
- Driver: Parallel Lines (Japanese version) (2006): Action
- Arcana Heart (2007): Fighting
- Suggoi! Arcana Heart 2 (2009): Fighting

=== PlayStation 3 ===
- Vampire Rain: Altered Species (2008): Action-adventure/Stealth

=== PlayStation Portable ===
- Jitsuroku Oniyome Nikki (2006): Action
- Anata wo Yurusanai (2007): Sound novel
- Higurashi no Naku Koro ni Jan (2009): Mahjong
- CR Hana no Keiji Zan (Cancelled): Pachinko simulator

=== Wii ===
- Victorious Boxers: Revolution (2007): Fighting
- The World of Golden Eggs: Nori Nori Rhythm-kei (2008): Rhythm action
- Ju-on: The Grudge (2009): Survival horror/Graphic adventure
- Club Penguin: Game Day! (2010): Minigame collection

=== Nintendo DS ===
- Boing! Docomodake DS (2007): Puzzle
- Korg DS-10 (2008): Music synthesizer software
- Blue Dragon Plus (2008): Tactical role-playing
- Away: Shuffle Dungeon (2008): Role-playing
- Korg DS-10 Plus (2009): Music synthesizer software
- Korg M01 (2010): Music synthesizer software

=== Nintendo 3DS ===
- Cubic Ninja (2011): Action puzzle

=== Xbox 360 ===
- Tetris: The Grand Master ACE (2005): Puzzle
- Tsuushin Taisen Mahjong Touryuumon (2006): Mahjong
- Bullet Witch (2006): Action-adventure
- Vampire Rain (2007): Action-adventure/Stealth

=== Browser game ===
- Browser Sangokushi (2009): Strategy/Simulation
- Baka to Test to Shōkanjū for Mixi (2010): Quiz/Simulation
- Derby Master (2010): Horse racing/Simulation
- Browser Baseball (2010): Sports/Simulation

=== iPhone ===
- Glandarius Wing Strike (2009): Shoot 'em up

== Developed games ==
=== Wii ===
- The Last Story (2011) – co-developed with Mistwalker / published by Nintendo

=== Nintendo 3DS ===
- Animal Resort (2011) – published by Marvelous Entertainment

=== PlayStation 3 ===
- No More Heroes: Heroes' Paradise (2010) – published by Marvelous Entertainment and Konami
