= List of Crayon Shin-chan episodes (1992–2001) =

This is a list of Crayon Shin-chan episodes that aired from 1992 to 2001.

== 1992 ==
| No. | Title | Original release date |
|---|---|---|
| 1 | "Running an Errand"; Transliteration: "Otsukai ni Iku zo" (Japanese: おつかいに行くゾ) | April 13, 1992 |
| 1 | "Mom's Mornings are Busy"; Transliteration: "Mama no Asa wa Isogashii zo" (Japanese: ママの朝は忙しいゾ) | April 13, 1992 |
| 1 | "Drawing"; Transliteration: "Oekakisuru zo" (Japanese: お絵かきするゾ) | April 13, 1992 |
Misae forgets to buy some ingredients for dinner that she is cooking for a client of Hiroshi, so she asks Shin to go get them for her. But Shin makes this task more complicated than it should. It was later revealed that Hiroshi's client had to cancel the dinner. Misae tries to get Shin-chan to board the school bus as he's been missing it a lot, but Shin-chan ends up missing the bus due to the need to use the toilet at the last second. Shin-chan and his friends learn how to draw in school. Shin-chan finds faults in others, even though fails in it himself. His teacher Yoshinaga helps him draw a plane.
| 2 | "Tricycles are Fun"; Transliteration: "Sanrinsha wa Tanoshii zo" (Japanese: 三輪車は楽しいゾ) | April 20, 1992 |
| 2 | "My Stomach Is Going to Burst"; Transliteration: "Onaka ga panpan Itai zo" (Japanese: お腹がパンパン痛いゾ) | April 20, 1992 |
| 2 | "A Nightmare for Dad"; Transliteration: "Touchan datte Taihen dazo" (Japanese: 父ちゃんだって大変だゾ) | April 20, 1992 |
After much hesitation, Misae gives Shin a tricycle to play with. When he accidentally drops it into a dirty lake, Misae tries to find it. While this is happening, Shin runs off, making Misae think that she's been a bad parent, but it is revealed that Shin ran off because "Action Mask" was starting. Shin-chan has an upset stomach as he has not gone to the toilet for three days. The teachers give him medicine and he gets well. Shin-chan goes to a restaurant with Hiroshi as Misae is not home, but Hiroshi finds it tedious being with Shin-chan and is relieved when Misae returns.
| 3 | "Watching Action Mask"; Transliteration: "Akushon kamen wo miru zo" (Japanese: アクション仮面を見るゾ) | April 27, 1992 |
| 3 | "School Lunch is Fun"; Transliteration: "Kyuushoku wa tanoshii zo" (Japanese: 給食は楽しいゾ) | April 27, 1992 |
| 3 | "Going to the Dentist"; Transliteration: "Haisha ni iku zo" (Japanese: 歯医者に行くゾ) | April 27, 1992 |
When he fails to reach home by his curfew, Misae punishes Shin by making him sit out on the porch, causing him to miss out on "Action Mask". Shin tries all sorts of ways to get into the house, until he finds a loophole and goes to watch it at Nene's house instead. All the food containers fall on the ground because of Shin-chan, so Kazama makes an excuse, but later realizes there is more food. Misae takes Shin-chan to the dentist to get his cavities treated. After coming home, he continues eating junk food in the hope to meet the attractive dentist again, which annoys Misae.
| 4 | "The Sunflower Class"; Transliteration: "Ninkyō himawari-gumi dazo" (Japanese: 任侠ひまわり組だゾ) | May 4, 1992 |
| 4 | "Going on a Picnic"; Transliteration: "Pikunikku ni iku zo" (Japanese: ピクニックに行くゾ) | May 4, 1992 |
The principal visits the students. Shin-chan asks the principal to sing a song. He kicks an empty can on a car, but the principal saves him. In this two part segment, Shin-chan helps Misae prepare food for the picnic. Shin-chan keeps some snacks with him and the lunch box on the boot of the car. After Shin-chan and his parents reach the picnic spot, Misae finds out that the lunch box was kept on the back of the car.
| 5 | "Going to the Movies"; Transliteration: "Eiga ni iku zo" (Japanese: 映画に行くゾ) | May 11, 1992 |
| 5 | "A Good Boy`s Present"; Transliteration: "Yoi ko no purezento dazo" (Japanese: よい子のプレゼントだゾ) | May 11, 1992 |
| 5 | "Lending a Hand"; Transliteration: "Otetsudai suru zo" (Japanese: お手伝いするゾ) | May 11, 1992 |
Misae and Shin-chan go to see a movie, but Shin-chan bothers her and everyone watching the film. As a result, she is forced to leave. Yoshinaga asks Shin-chan to keep the surrounding area clean and behave like a good boy as part of her birthday present. Everyone gets amazed with Shin-chan's behaviour. However, the next day Shin-chan resumes being naughty. Shin-chan wakes his father for food and acts stubborn with him.
| 6 | "Tidying Up"; Transliteration: "Seiri shi chau zo" (Japanese: 整理しちゃうゾ) | May 18, 1992 |
| 6 | "Raising Tadpoles"; Transliteration: "O mata ja kushi wo kau zo" (Japanese: おまたじゃくしを飼うゾ) | May 18, 1992 |
| 6 | "Bathing with Mom"; Transliteration: "Kāchan to o furo dazo" (Japanese: 母ちゃんとお風呂だゾ) | May 18, 1992 |
Shin-chan helps Misae with the house work, but draws pictures on the walls and on his and Misae's face with the permanent marker when Misae falls asleep. Hiroshi fails to control his laughter. Shin-chan and other students learn about tadpoles in school. Masao and Kazama bring tadpoles to school. Yoshinaga puts the tadpoles into the pond after knowing about their life when they grow up. Shin takes a bath with Misae because Hiroshi had to work late. In the process, Misae has to refill the bath tub multiple times because Shin kept putting things in it (e.g. a beer that Hiroshi most likely left for his bath, mud or dirt). In the end, Shin pees in the tub and Misae forces Shin to take a shower, who knocks down Misae's new expensive "SAKIO" shampoo, spilling in the drain.
| 7 | "Disaster Drills Are a Nightmare"; Transliteration: "Hina n kunren wa taihen dazo" (Japanese: ひなん訓練は大変だゾ) | May 25, 1992 |
| 7 | "I Found a Puppy"; Transliteration: "Koinu wo hirotta zo" (Japanese: 小犬を拾ったゾ) | May 25, 1992 |
| 7 | "His Name is Shiro"; Transliteration: "Namae wa shiro dazo" (Japanese: 名前はシロだゾ) | May 25, 1992 |
Yoshinaga trains the students about the evacuation process. Shin-chan uses the extinguisher and blows out the fire. Everyone feels proud of him, except for the teachers and the principal, who he humiliated. Shin-chan finds an unknown puppy and takes him home. He hides it from his mother, but she finds out and scolds him. Misae doesn't let the puppy stay in the house, but as Shin-chan gets attached to it, they keep it and name it Shiro.
| 8 | "Going for a Walk with Shiro"; Transliteration: "Shiro to sanpo ni iku zo" (Japanese: シロと散歩に行くゾ) | June 1, 1992 |
| 8 | "Building Shiro's House"; Transliteration: "Shiro no ie wo tsukuru zo" (Japanese: シロの家を作るゾ) | June 1, 1992 |
| 8 | "I Hate Green Peppers"; Transliteration: "Pīman wa kirai dazo" (Japanese: ピーマンは嫌いだゾ) | June 1, 1992 |
Shin-chan plays with Shiro and takes him for a walk. Shiro eats all the meat that was kept for dinner, leaving Misae and Shin-chan with nothing to eat. Hiroshi creates a dog house for Shiro, but Misae spoils it, so they buy a readymade dog house. Shin-chan becomes so engrossed in watching TV that he hardly eats his food. Misae tries to get Shin-chan to eat green peppers, but he refuses and gives them to Shiro instead.
| 9 | "Not Getting in Dad's Way"; Transliteration: "Tōchan no jama wa shinai zo" (Japanese: 父ちゃんのジャマはしないゾ) | June 8, 1992 |
| 9 | "Playing with Clay"; Transliteration: "Nendo de ason jau zo" (Japanese: 粘土で遊んじゃうゾ) | June 8, 1992 |
| 9 | "Standing and Reading in the Bookstore"; Transliteration: "Hon'ya de tachiyomi dazo" (Japanese: 本屋で立ち読みだゾ) | June 8, 1992 |
Misae manages to stop Shin-chan from disturbing Hiroshi while he is working. After finishing his work, Hiroshi plays with Shin-chan, but Shin-chan unknowingly ruins Hiroshi's work. Yoshinaga teaches the children how to create stuff with clay. Shin-chan borrows clay from Yoshinaga and creates a giraffe. Shin-chan goes to a book shop and reads manga without buying it.
| 10 | "A College Girl Is My Friend"; Transliteration: "Joshidai-sei wa o tomodachi dazo" (Japanese: 女子大生はお友達だゾ) | June 15, 1992 |
| 10 | "I Want a High-Fleg Swimsuit"; Transliteration: "Haigure mizugi ga hoshī zo" (Japanese: ハイグレ水着が欲しいゾ) | June 15, 1992 |
| 10 | "It's Pool Time"; Transliteration: "Pūru no jikan dazo" (Japanese: プールの時間だゾ) | June 15, 1992 |
Shin-chan takes shelter in an apartment of a college girl named Shinobu. She tries to kick Shin-chan out but to no avail./ Shin-chan and Misae go to the department store to buy new swim trunks because his old ones have gotten too small. /During pool time at kindergarten, Shin-chan competes in a swimming contest with Kazama.
| 11 | "Feeding Shiro"; Transliteration: "Shiro ni esa wo ageru zo" (Japanese: シロにエサをあげるゾ) | June 29, 1992 |
| 11 | "Marital Disputes Are a Nightmare"; Transliteration: "Fūfu genka wa taihen dazo" (Japanese: 夫婦ゲンカは大変だゾ) | June 29, 1992 |
| 11 | "Dragnet Fishing with Our Parents"; Transliteration: "Oyako de jibikiami dazo" (Japanese: 親子で地引き網だゾ) | June 29, 1992 |
Misae gets dog food for Shiro and tells Shin-chan to feed it to Shiro, but Shin-chan forgets to feed him, and Shiro ends up eating Misae's dress out of hunger. Misae scolds Shin-chan for watching TV for too long and not doing his homework, but Hiroshi pampers Shin-chan. Hence, Misae gets angry at him, too. The students and their parents go on a family picnic organized by the school. They fish and have a great time.
| 12 | "Going to the Barbershop"; Transliteration: "Tokoya-san he iku zo" (Japanese: 床屋さんへ行くゾ) | July 6, 1992 |
| 12 | "Protecting My Treasure"; Transliteration: "Takaramono wa ora ga mamoru zo" (Japanese: 宝物はオラが守るゾ) | July 6, 1992 |
| 12 | "Filming a Video"; Transliteration: "Bideo de satsuei suru zo" (Japanese: ビデオで撮影するゾ) | July 6, 1992 |
Hiroshi and Shin-chan go to the salon for a haircut. The hair stylist quits her job because of Shin-chan's mischief. Hiroshi and Shin-chan get kicked out. All the students talk about the treasures they have. Shin-chan appoints himself as Masao's bodyguard and protects him wherever he goes. Hiroshi and Misae purchase a camera. Hiroshi creates a realistic video of Misae and Shin-chan together.
| 13 | "Swimming in the Sea Is Fun"; Transliteration: "Kaisuiyoku wa tanoshī zo" (Japanese: 海水浴は楽しいゾ) | July 13, 1992 |
| 13 | "Staying at a Luxury Hotel"; Transliteration: "Gōka hoteru ni tomaru zo" (Japanese: 豪華ホテルに泊まるゾ) | July 13, 1992 |
| 13 | "The Long Road Home"; Transliteration: "Kaerimichi wa tōi zo" (Japanese: 帰り道は遠いゾ) | July 13, 1992 |
Hiroshi, Misae and Shin-chan go to the Sea Side Beach for a holiday, where Shin-chan helps a female swimmer who lost her bikini bra by taking off Misae's bikini bra while she's sleeping and giving it to her. Misae later beats up Hiroshi and Shin-chan for their mischief. While spending the night at the Sea Side Hotel, Shin-chan eats too much ice cream after dinner and catches a cold. Hiroshi, Misae and Shin-chan leave the Sea Side Hotel to go home and get stuck in traffic. After being stranded for so long and reaching home at 3 am, Misae and Hiroshi become tired, but Shin-chan remains energetic.
| 14 | "Mom's Afternoon Nap"; Transliteration: "Kāchan no hirune dazo" (Japanese: 母ちゃんの昼寝だゾ) | July 20, 1992 |
| 14 | "Attending English Class"; Transliteration: "Ēgo shi chau zo" (Japanese: エーゴしちゃうゾ) | July 20, 1992 |
| 14 | "Tonight, We're Lighting Fireworks"; Transliteration: "Kon'ya wa hanabi wo yaru zo" (Japanese: 今夜は花火をやるゾ) | July 20, 1992 |
Shin-chan plays with Shiro so that his mother can get some sleep. When Misae wakes up, she finds Shin-chan fast asleep in Shiro's house. Shin-chan goes for English tuition. The teacher gets annoyed with Shin-chan and sends him home with the frog puppet. Shin-chan goes shopping with his mom and purchases firecrackers. He burns the sparklers on the gas stove, but Hiroshi quickly extinguishes the fire.
| 15 | "Riding the Train"; Transliteration: "Denshaninoru zo" (Japanese: 電車に乗るゾ) | July 27, 1992 |
| 15 | "We Rode the Train"; Transliteration: "Densha ni notta zo" (Japanese: 電車に乗ったゾ) | July 27, 1992 |
| 15 | "Choosing a Sentō"; Transliteration: "Sentō de ason jau zo" (Japanese: 銭湯で遊んじゃうゾ) | July 27, 1992 |
Shin-chan and his mother go to the station. While waiting for the train to arrive, Shin-chan forces his mother to take him to the washroom but doesn't go. Finally, they go home in a taxi. / Misae and Shin-chan board the train to go to the departmental store but forget their shoes in the train. They arrive too late to reach the store. / ??
| 16 | "Take Care of Mom"; Transliteration: "Kāchan no kanbyō dazo" (Japanese: 母ちゃんの看病だゾ) | August 10, 1992 |
| 16 | "Playing with a Bully"; Transliteration: "Ijime-kko to asobu zo" (Japanese: いじめっ子と遊ぶゾ) | August 10, 1992 |
| 16 | "Going to the Summer Festival"; Transliteration: "En'nichi ni iku zo" (Japanese: 縁日に行くゾ) | August 10, 1992 |
Shin-chan helps his mother get well by filling the ice bag with water, but because he forgets to close it, the room gets flooded. Shin-chan and Masao go into the park to play. Shin-chan bravely chases away Takeshi, who snatches food from other children. Shin-chan spends his parents' money on food and games at the Summer Festival. They end their day by watching fireworks.
| 17 | "Meeting Action Mask"; Transliteration: "Akushon kamen ni au zo" (Japanese: アクション仮面に会うゾ) | August 17, 1992 |
| 17 | "Yoshinaga-sensei's Date"; Transliteration: "Yoshinaga-sensei no dēto dazo" (Japanese: よしなが先生のデートだゾ) | August 17, 1992 |
| 17 | "The Forgotten Shiro"; Transliteration: "Wasure rareta shiro dazo" (Japanese: 忘れられたシロだゾ) | August 17, 1992 |
Shin-chan is glad to meet Action Mask and get an autograph from him. Yoshinaga arrives quite early to meet her date. While waiting, Shin-chan comes and annoys her. When her date fails to show up, Hiroshi invites her for tea and snacks. Misae prepares a variety of food, as Shin-chan fulfils his responsibility of giving Shiro a bath.
| 18 | "Playing Baseball with Daddy"; Transliteration: "Tōchan to yakyū suru zo" (Japanese: 父ちゃんと野球するゾ) | August 31, 1992 |
| 18 | "Nene-chan's Mom Is Kind"; Transliteration: "Nene-chan no mama wa yūshī zo" (Japanese: ネネちゃんのママは優しいゾ) | August 31, 1992 |
| 18 | "Grandfather Has Come"; Transliteration: "Jīchan ga kita zo" (Japanese: じいちゃんが来たゾ) | August 31, 1992 |
Hiroshi decides to train Shin-chan to be a baseball player. He begins his training, but takes Shiro along with him instead of Shin-chan. Shin-chan meets Nene-chan's mother Moeko and frustrates her. Nene-chan cries upon seeing her mother yell at Shin-chan, but Shin-chan doesn't care. Upon Shin-chan's grandparents' arrival, Misae prepares a variety of food. Shin-chan enjoys the company of his grandfather.
| 19 | "A Typhoon Came Around"; Transliteration: "Taifū ga yattekuru zo" (Japanese: 台風がやってくるゾ) | September 7, 1992 |
| 19 | "Duelling"; Transliteration: "Kettō shi chau zo" (Japanese: 決闘しちゃうゾ) | September 7, 1992 |
| 19 | "Writing a Letter"; Transliteration: "O tegami wo dasu zo" (Japanese: お手紙を出すゾ) | September 7, 1992 |
Misae and Shin-chan stay indoors due to bad weather. Hiroshi returns from work and stays out, as they all fall asleep. Some Rose Class students urge Shin-chan to come after school with his class to fight, but Shin-chan acts lazy, angering the students. Shin-chan writes a letter to Misae, which states that Shin-chan loves his mother a lot. Misae gets emotional upon reading it.
| 20 | "Brushing My Teeth After Eating" (Japanese: 食後のハミガキだゾ) | September 14, 1992 |
| 20 | "Wetting The Bed 3 Times" (Japanese: おねしょ3連発だゾ) | September 14, 1992 |
| 20 | "Dancing the Blues" (Japanese: ブルースでおどるゾ) | September 14, 1992 |
After finishing his dinner, Shin-chan brushes his teeth with new toothpaste. His mother beats him for eating junk food after brushing and makes him brush his teeth again. While sleeping, Shin-chan accidentally wets his bed 3 times. He tries to cover it up each time with his parents and Shiro, but Misae finds out about what he did the next morning and scolds him. Yoshinaga-sensei trains the students to dance for sports day. As Matsuzaka and Yoshinaga go to meet the principal, Kazama takes lead, but Shin-chan does his own dance steps.
| 21 | "Doing My Best At Sports Day" (Japanese: 運動会でがんばるゾ) | September 21, 1992 |
| 21 | "Running With Mommy" (Japanese: 母ちゃんと走るゾ) | September 21, 1992 |
| 21 | "Winning a Relay" (Japanese: リレーで勝負だゾ) | September 21, 1992 |
At the Sports Day event, Shin-chan begins marching well, but forgets his steps. All the students get confused and follow Shin-chan. During the Sports Day event, the children take a break before the parent-child race. Misae and Shin-chan begin their race but Shin-chan ruins it. In an interclass relay race, Shin-chan races Kawamura and wins, to the joy of the Sunflower Class.
| 22 | "Fighting with Mommy" (Japanese: 母ちゃんと格闘だゾ) | October 12, 1992 |
| 22 | "Playing with Soap Bubbles" (Japanese: シャボン玉で遊ぶゾ) | October 12, 1992 |
| 22 | "The Bookstore Once Again" (Japanese: またまた本屋さんだゾ) | October 12, 1992 |
Misae doesn't let Shin-chan in, but he enters anyhow and watches Action Mask. Later, he hides in the washroom to escape Misae's scolding. Shin-chan challenges Kazama to make a big bubble out of the soap water that his mother made for him and wins. Shin-chan buys 2 magazines and forgets the change at the counter. The cashier runs after him to return it, but Shin-chan fails to understand.
| 23 | "The Password is Misae" (Japanese: 合言葉はみさえだゾ) | October 19, 1992 |
| 23 | "Competing with Stilts" (Japanese: 竹馬で競争するゾ) | October 19, 1992 |
| 23 | "Dad’s Picking Up" (Japanese: とーちゃんのオムカエだゾ) | October 19, 1992 |
Shin-chan decides a code for him and his mother as she goes out. Shin-chan makes the courier man utter the code and pesters him. Yoshinaga brings stilts for the kids to play with. Kawamura and Kazama give up, but Shin-chan continues performing stunts on the stilts. Shin-chan and Misae go to the station to pick up Hiroshi as he doesn't have an umbrella. They decide to get drenched and enjoy the showers.
| 24 | "A Female College Student's Work is Hard" (Japanese: 女子大生バイトはつらいゾ) | October 26, 1992 |
| 24 | "I’m in a Play" (Japanese: オラがお芝居するゾ) | October 26, 1992 |
| 24 | "My parents are fighting" (Japanese: 夫婦ゲンカのチューサイだゾ) | October 26, 1992 |
Shin-chan gives a hand-written note to purchase a burger at the restruant where Shinobu is working at. The manager yells at Shinobu and makes her pay for it. Shin-chan brings his friends along to eat burgers with the hand-written notes. / Shin-chan is acting in a school play. His role is a kind man who helps a bird and gets a gift in return. He gets confused with the gifts and says what he is not supposed to say, but the audience enjoys the act. / ???
| 25 | "Duel with the Cockroach" (Japanese: ゴキブリさんと決闘だゾ) | November 2, 1992 |
| 25 | "Bodycheck time!" (Japanese: 身体測定の時間だゾ) | November 2, 1992 |
| 25 | "Cleaning Daddy's Car" (Japanese: とーちゃんと車のお掃除だゾ) | November 2, 1992 |
Misae seeks help from Shin-chan to look out for a cockroach and chase it away. After a long struggle, they fail to get hold of the cockroach. / ??? / Shin-chan helps Hiroshi wash the car and scrapes the paint in the process. After they finish with the wash, Misae ends up scratching the car with her bicycle.
| 26 | "Lost at the Department Store" (Japanese: デパートで迷子だゾ) | November 9, 1992 |
| 26 | "Cleaning the hen-house" (Japanese: ニワトリ小屋のソージだゾ) | November 9, 1992 |
| 26 | "My Shichi-Go-San" (Japanese: オラの七五三だゾ) | November 9, 1992 |
Shin-chan accompanies his mother at the department store and realises that he is lost. He seeks help from the staff. Shin-chan and his friends clean the poultry farm. When Shin-chan arrives home, he sits on the eggs to get chicks to come out of them. Shin-chan visits the temple with his parents and prays that Misae give him Chocobi instead of green peppers.
| 27 | "Preventing a Cold" (Japanese: カゼの予防はウガイだゾ) | November 16, 1992 |
| 27 | "Helping Out Yoshinaga-sensei" (Japanese: よしなが先生のお手伝いだゾ) | November 16, 1992 |
| 27 | "Buying Yakiimo" (Japanese: ヤキイモを買うゾ) | November 16, 1992 |
Shin-chan falls ill. So, his mother gets him some medicine and teaches him how to gargle his mouth, but he acts mischievous. Shin-chan and Nene-chan meet Yoshinaga. Shin-chan troubles her by taking her belongings and later asks for her forgiveness. Shin-chan purchases sweet potatoes for his mother from a vendor and decides to purchase them every time.
| 28 | "A Hospital Visit" (Japanese: 病院へお見舞いだゾ) | November 23, 1992 |
| 28 | "Hide-and-Seek" (Japanese: かくれんぼするゾ) | November 23, 1992 |
| 28 | "Going to the Zoo" (Japanese: 動物園に行くゾ) | November 23, 1992 |
Shin-chan goes to the hospital with Misae to visit Keiko-san and troubles the nurse. He gets scolded by his mother, who feels sorry for not recognizing Keiko-san. When Shin-chan plays hide-and-seek with his friends, he hides and falls asleep. Later, his friends and Misae go looking for him. Shin-chan gets interviewed when he goes to the zoo with his family. He feels excited to see himself on the TV.
| 29 | "The Zoo is Fun" (Japanese: 動物園は楽しいゾ) | November 30, 1992 |
| 29 | "Mom and the Beauty Salon" (Japanese: 母ちゃんと美容院だゾ) | November 30, 1992 |
| 29 | "I Want My Year-End Gift" (Japanese: おせーぼが欲しいゾ) | November 30, 1992 |
Shin-chan goes out for a school trip to the zoo and annoys the animals and his teacher there. Shin-chan goes to the beauty parlour with his mother and troubles her and the daycare worker to play Action Mask games with him. Shin-chan goes shopping with his parents and demands gifts from them. He later opens up all the gifts his parents bought for their neighbours while they're away.
| 30 | "Mom and the Bank" (Japanese: 母ちゃんと銀行だゾ) | December 7, 1992 |
| 30 | "Together with a Policewoman" (Japanese: 婦警さんと一緒だゾ) | December 7, 1992 |
| 30 | "Going into the Bath with Daddy" (Japanese: 父ちゃんと風呂に入るゾ) | December 7, 1992 |
Shin-chan follows Misae on her way to the bank to withdraw money and harasses her by not letting her withdraw cash. / The traffic cops visit Shin-chan's school to teach the students about traffic safety rules. They complain to the teacher about Shin-chan being the naughtiest child in the class. / ??
| 31 | "Staying at home with Shiro" (Japanese: シロとお留守番だゾ) | December 14, 1992 |
| 31 | "Matsuzaka-sensei's Secret" (Japanese: まつざか先生のヒミツだゾ) | December 14, 1992 |
| 31 | "Grandfather Came Again" (Japanese: じいちゃんがまた来たゾ) | December 14, 1992 |
Misae asks Shin-chan to be at home with Shiro and take care of the house so that she can go out to buy groceries. After Misae returns from the market, she gets furious upon seeing the mess in the house. / Shin-chan keeps a watch on his school teacher and later tells everyone about Matsuzaka eating free food at the market and gets her embarrassed. / ??
| 32 | "My First Ski" (Japanese: オラの初スキーだゾ) | December 21, 1992 |
| 32 | "It's fun being at Kazama-kun's house" (Japanese: 風間くんちは楽しいゾ) | December 21, 1992 |
| 32 | "Action Mask and Xmas" (Japanese: アクション仮面とXマスだゾ) | December 21, 1992 |
Shin-chan and Hiroshi experience a snow storm while skiing, so they return home. Shin-chan visits Kazama's house and gets amazed to see such a beautiful house. Later, he acts mischievous and ends up messing the entire house. Shin-chan meets Action Mask on Christmas Day, but later, he finds out that it is Hiroshi dressed up as Action Mask and feels sad.
| SPECIAL–1 | "Prologue" (Japanese: プロローグ) | December 28, 1992 |
| SPECIAL–1 | "So Many Promises" (Japanese: お約束がいっぱいだゾ) | December 28, 1992 |
| SPECIAL–1 | "Making Mochi at the Kindergarten" (Japanese: 幼稚園でおもちつきだゾ) | December 28, 1992 |
| SPECIAL–1 | "The Kotatsu is So Warm" (Japanese: コタツはあったかいゾ) | December 28, 1992 |
| SPECIAL–1 | "Buriburizaemon’s Adventures" (Japanese: ブリブリざえもんのボーケンだゾ) | December 28, 1992 |
| SPECIAL–1 | "The Big Clean is a Big Endeavor" (Japanese: 大ソージは大騒動だゾ) | December 28, 1992 |
| SPECIAL–1 | "Going Shopping on New Year’s" (Japanese: お正月の買い出しに行くゾ) | December 28, 1992 |
| SPECIAL–1 | "The Action Mask Special" (Japanese: アクション仮面スペシャルだゾ) | December 28, 1992 |
| SPECIAL–1 | "Memories from the Past Year" (Japanese: 今年の思い出だゾ) | December 28, 1992 |
| SPECIAL–1 | "A Bonus" (Japanese: おまけだゾ) | December 28, 1992 |

== 1993 ==
| No. | Title | Original release date |
|---|---|---|
| 33 | "Eating O-zōni" (Japanese: おゾウニを食べるゾ) | January 11, 1993 |
| 33 | "Kiteflying Is Fun" (Japanese: たこあげは楽しいゾ) | January 11, 1993 |
| 33 | "Let's Make a Snowman" (Japanese: 雪だるまを作るゾ) | January 11, 1993 |
Misae prepares o-zōni, but while eating it, Shin-chan begins to play with the food and ends up causing trouble for his mother. Shin-chan and his friends fly kites, but as the strings get tangled, they ask for Hiroshi's help to sort it out. Shin-chan goes out with his father and makes a huge snowman. Later, Shin-chan dresses the snowman with Misae's clothes.
| 34 | "Making a Lunch Box Is Tough" (Japanese: お弁当作りは大変だゾ) | January 18, 1993 |
| 34 | "Playing House" (Japanese: おままごとするゾ) | January 18, 1993 |
| 34 | "Helping Out at the Bookstore" (Japanese: 本屋さんを手伝うゾ) | January 18, 1993 |
Shin helps Misae cook for dinner, but makes things way more complicated than they should be. Using the skills Misae just showed him, Shin 'plays house'. Shinchan tries to help out at the book store, but ends up making a mess in the process.
| 35 | "I’m a Photo Model" (Japanese: オラが写真のモデルだゾ) | January 25, 1993 |
| 35 | "Trips to the Hot Springs Are Fun" (Japanese: 温泉旅行は楽しいゾ) | January 25, 1993 |
| 35 | "Bathing Together in the Hot Springs" (Japanese: 温泉で混浴だゾ) | January 25, 1993 |
Shin-chan gets the opportunity to become a model for a magazine ad. After the shoot, Keiko's camera is accidentally broken by Shin-chan. A person comes to Shin-chan to learn to swim, and his parents are worried and run to save Shin-chan, only to find out that the unknown person was a good man.
| 36 | "Bean Throwing during Setsubun" (Japanese: 節分で豆まきだゾ) | February 1, 1993 |
| 36 | "Mommy Goes shopping" (Japanese: 網にかかったみさえだゾ) | February 1, 1993 |
| 36 | "I Love Hotpot in Winter" (Japanese: 冬のナベはサイコーだゾ) | February 1, 1993 |
The students and Yoshinaga throw beans out in the air as a celebration to bring peace and harmony at the end of winter. While Shin-chan and Misae go shopping, a sales executive tries hard to make a sale, but Shin-chan troubles Misae and they leave. Shin-chan, Misae and Hiroshi prepare a hotpot meal together. They have dinner and fun at the same time.
| 37 | "I Caught a Cold" (Japanese: カゼをひいちゃったゾ) | February 8, 1993 |
| 37 | "Being a Policeman Is Tough" (Japanese: おまわりさんは大変だゾ) | February 8, 1993 |
| 37 | "Karaoke Session" (Japanese: カラオケで歌うゾ) | February 8, 1993 |
Shin-chan visits the doctor with his mother to treat his fever and causes trouble for him. The doctor regrets being a child specialist. Shin-chan gets lost and meets a policeman. He troubles the policeman with his questions. Misae finds Shin-chan in the police station and is overjoyed. Hiroshi, Misae, Shin-chan and Keiko go out for karaoke. They all sing and have a great time.
| 38 | "Buying Taiyaki" (Japanese: たい焼きを買いに行くゾ) | February 15, 1993 |
| 38 | "Sleepover at School" (Japanese: おとまり保育だゾ) | February 15, 1993 |
| 38 | "Spending the Night at School" (Japanese: おとまり保育の夜だゾ) | February 15, 1993 |
Shin-chan goes to buy taiyaki for his mother, but pesters the shopkeeper with his questions. The students have a sleepover at school, during which Yoshinaga plays an animated movie for them. In the night, after listening to a horror story, Shin-chan gets restless and wakes Kazama up to play with him. Shin-chan falls asleep in the toilet when he goes with Masao.
| 39 | "Quiet in the Library" (Japanese: 図書館では静かにするゾ) | February 22, 1993 |
| 39 | "Practicing for the Marathon" (Japanese: マラソンの練習だゾ) | February 22, 1993 |
| 39 | "The School Marathon" (Japanese: マラソン大会だゾ) | February 22, 1993 |
Shin-chan and Misae visit a library to purchase books for Shin-chan, but he causes trouble for his mother and the librarian by making noise. Shin-chan, Hiroshi and Misae go out to practise for the marathon, but they find it difficult due to the cold weather. The Rose Class and the Sunflower Class compete in a marathon race. The principal declares Shin-chan the winner as he helps Masao in his injury.
| 40 | "Doll Festival" (Japanese: おひなまつりだゾ) | March 1, 1993 |
| 40 | "Go to Swimming School" (Japanese: スイミングスクールへ行くゾ) | March 1, 1993 |
| 40 | "Training Shiro" (Japanese: シロに芸を仕込むゾ) | March 1, 1993 |
Shin-chan and his friends go to Nene-chan's house. Nene-chan's mother prepares cake for the kids, but Shin-chan ruins it. Misae sends Shin-chan to swim school to learn how to swim and feels happy to see Shin-chan swim by himself. Shin-chan trains Shiro to be a circus star, but Shiro flops during the show. Shin-chan gets upset, but he tries again.
| 41 | "Playing Badminton" (Japanese: バトミントンするゾ) | March 8, 1993 |
| 41 | "Going on a Field Trip" (Japanese: 社会見学に行くゾ) | March 8, 1993 |
| 41 | "Going for a Walk with Shiro" (Japanese: 名犬シロと散歩だゾ) | March 8, 1993 |
Shin-chan plays badminton with Hiroshi and Misae, but during the game, Misae and Hiroshi end up fighting with each other. The students go on a field trip to the bread factory. Shin-chan ends up causing trouble for Yoshinaga during their journey. Shin-chan causes trouble for Misae by messing up the house. Later, when Shiro and Shin-chan go for a walk, they meet Kawamura and compare his dog to Shiro.
| 42 | "Ordering Pizza" (Japanese: 出前ピザをたのむゾ) | March 15, 1993 |
| 42 | "Masao-kun's Hamster" (Japanese: マサオ君のハムスターだゾ) | March 15, 1993 |
| 42 | "Drying the Bedsheets" (Japanese: おフトンをほすゾ) | March 15, 1993 |
Shin-chan drops the pizza that Misae orders and does not tell her about it. While enjoying the pizza, she realises later that it was the same pizza. Masao brings a hamster to school. Shin-chan frightens Yoshinaga with it, so she asks Matsuzaka's help to get rid of it. Shin-chan has a nightmare about a monster and wets his bed. The next morning, Shin-chan is made to dry his mattress.
| 43 | "Soccer Practice" (Japanese: サッカーの練習だゾ) | March 22, 1993 |
| 43 | "Soccer Match" (Japanese: サッカー大会だゾ) | March 22, 1993 |
| 43 | "Earthquake" (Japanese: 地震が来たゾ) | March 22, 1993 |
While playing soccer, Kawamura underestimates Shin-chan and his friends but fails to score a goal. He cries and leaves the field. The Rose and Sunflower Classes compete in a soccer match. The Sunflower Team wins the match by scoring during the penalty shootouts. Misae, Shin-chan and Hiroshi prepare for an earthquake, but fall asleep when it actually takes place.
| 44 | "A Place for Cherry Blossom Viewing" (Japanese: お花見の場所とりだゾ) | March 29, 1993 |
| 44 | "Cherry Blossom Viewing Is Fun" (Japanese: お花見は楽しいゾ) | March 29, 1993 |
| 44 | "A Visit to Daddy's Office" (Japanese: 父ちゃんの会社へ行くゾ) | March 29, 1993 |
A man reserves a place for cherry blossom viewing and does not let Shin-chan and his friends in that area. While he is away, the children take over. So he convinces the kids by giving them ice cream to get his place back. Misae and Shin-chan go to Hiroshi's office to deliver some papers. Upon arrival, Shin-chan and Misae are greeted by Hiroshi's colleagues. Shin-chan feels happy to see his dad work so hard.
| SPECIAL–2 | "Shiro is Also Hard All Day" (Japanese: シロも一日大変だゾ) | April 5, 1993 |
| SPECIAL–2 | "Great Adventures in Dreamworld" (Japanese: 夢の世界の大ボーケンだゾ) | April 5, 1993 |
| SPECIAL–2 | "Watch CC Girls" (Japanese: CCガールズを見るゾ) | April 5, 1993 |
| SPECIAL–2 | "Action Mask is the Final Episode!" (Japanese: アクション仮面が最終回!だゾ) | April 5, 1993 |
| SPECIAL–2 | "Traveling with Mom" (Japanese: 母ちゃんと二人旅だゾ) | April 5, 1993 |
| SPECIAL–2 | "Bonus" (Japanese: おまけだゾ) | April 5, 1993 |
| 45 | "Sowing Seeds" (Japanese: たねまきをするゾ) | April 12, 1993 |
| 45 | "Going to the Grocery Store" (Japanese: 八百屋さんへおつかいだゾ) | April 12, 1993 |
| 45 | "A Face Without Eyebrows" (Japanese: マユゲなしの顔だゾ) | April 12, 1993 |
Yoshinaga teaches the students how to sow seeds. Shin-chan gets the water pipe and waters the seeds that are sown. Misae sends Shin-chan with a list of grocery items, but loses it. He returns home with vegetables of his choice and gets a scolding from his mother. Shin-chan observes his dad shaving and accidentally shaves off one of his eyebrows. He goes out to escape his mother's scolding.
| 46 | "Daddy is Drunk" (Japanese: よっぱらい父ちゃんだゾ) | April 19, 1993 |
| 46 | "I Am a Detective" (Japanese: オラは名探偵だゾ) | April 19, 1993 |
| 46 | "Going Shopping with Mummy" (Japanese: 母ちゃんと買物だゾ) | April 19, 1993 |
?? / Shin-chan decides to help Masao search for his crayon. After a long investigation, Shin-chan remembers Masao lending him the crayon and he gives it back to Masao. / Shin-chan is excited to go shopping with his mother. Later, he has trouble picking a snack for himself and ends up picking an expensive one.
| 47 | "Carp banner festival" (Japanese: 鯉のぼりをあげるゾ) | April 26, 1993 |
| 47 | "Kicking tin cans" (Japanese: カンケリをするゾ) | April 26, 1993 |
| 47 | "Elevator girl" (Japanese: エレベーターガールと一緒だゾ) | April 26, 1993 |
Hiroshi purchases a carp banner for his son and gives Shin-chan a surprise. Shin-chan borrows a can from his principal to play kick the can with his friends. They get Yoshinaga involved in the game, and she gets furious. Shin-chan gets stuck in the elevator when he goes shopping with his parents. After a long wait, they finally get their son back.
| 48 | "Mother's Strained Back!" (Japanese: ぎっくり腰の母ちゃんだゾ) | May 3, 1993 |
| 48 | "The Saleslady from Hell" (Japanese: 地獄のセールスレディだゾ) | May 3, 1993 |
| 48 | "Mother's Day" (Japanese: きょうは母の日だゾ) | May 3, 1993 |
Shin-chan goes along with his mother to the doctor as she has a backache, but troubles the doctor there. While playing, Shin-chan meets a lady he has seen before on TV. Shin-chan annoys the sales woman and gets her arrested. Shin-chan makes a Mother's Day card for his mother and also helps her make a cake. Hiroshi is amazed to see Shin-chan taking care of Misae.
| 49 | "Going Out for an Excursion" (Japanese: 遠足へ出発だゾ) | May 10, 1993 |
| 49 | "An Incident During the Excursion" (Japanese: 遠足でソーナンだゾ) | May 10, 1993 |
| 49 | "Do Not Play with Fire!" (Japanese: 火遊びはこわいゾ) | May 10, 1993 |
Shin-chan annoys Yoshinaga during a school trip. Later, when Kazama and Shin-chan go to the washroom, Shin-chan drops Kazama's handkerchief and makes him cry. During the trip, Shin-chan and his friends walk towards the jungle and get lost. They eventually find Yoshinaga and feel safe. While Misae is away, Shin-chan plays with some matches while impersonating the Little Match Girl and accidentally burns a hole on Misae's skirt.
| 50 | "I Hate Cleaning Up" (Japanese: おかたづけは苦手だゾ) | May 17, 1993 |
| 50 | "Night Time Is Adult Time" (Japanese: 夜は大人の時間だゾ) | May 17, 1993 |
| 50 | "My Book Is a Bestseller" (Japanese: オラの本はベストセラーだゾ) | May 17, 1993 |
Misae decides to throw Shin-chan's toys away. So, Shin-chan takes his toys and hides them at Shinobu's place. Shin-chan wakes up from his sleep and finds his parents having chocolate chips without him. Misae tries to put Shin-chan to sleep, but he doesn't fall asleep again. Shin-chan visits the bookstore to sell his book and takes the money from the customer who purchases his book.
| 51 | "Cutting Grass" (Japanese: 草むしりを手伝うゾ) | May 24, 1993 |
| 51 | "Yoshinaga-sensei is Sick" (Japanese: よしなが先生が急病だゾ) | May 24, 1993 |
| 51 | "Visiting My Teacher" (Japanese: よしなが先生のお見舞いだゾ) | May 24, 1993 |
?? / While Shin-chan waits for his mother to come to pick him up, Yoshinaga falls ill. Shin-Chan seeks help from Matsuzaka. The Principal takes a few students to meet Yoshinaga at the hospital. After they arrive at the hospital, they greet her and give her best wishes to get well soon.
| 52 | "I Hate Throwing Trash Away" (Japanese: ゴミ捨ても大変だゾ) | May 31, 1993 |
| 52 | "The Saleslady from Hell Returns" (Japanese: 帰ってきた地獄のセールスレディだゾ) | May 31, 1993 |
| 52 | "Revolving Sushi" (Japanese: 回転ずしを食べるゾ) | May 31, 1993 |
While searching for a garbage van, Shin-chan tears up the garbage bag and messes up the entire place. A saleslady follows Shin-chan around to force him to buy a book, but Shin-chan manages to escape. Hiroshi takes his family out for lunch, but Shin-chan ends up messing up the entire place and embarrasses his parents.
| 53 | "Helping Someone in Trouble" (Japanese: こまってる人を助けるゾ) | June 7, 1993 |
| 53 | "Being a Carpenter Is Tough" (Japanese: 大工仕事は大変だゾ) | June 7, 1993 |
| 53 | "Shiro is Missing" (Japanese: シロが行方不明だゾ) | June 7, 1993 |
Shin-chan decides to help people. He meets a man who asks him how to get to Kazama's house. But Shin-chan pesters him. Matsuzaka and Yoshinaga build a wooden house for the kids to play. But Shin-chan kicks the football and knocks down the new house. Shiro leaves the house as Shin-chan annoys him. Shin-chan worries about Shiro. However, Shiro returns home later that night.
| 54 | "Asking a Politician Questions" (Japanese: 政治家に質問だゾ) | June 14, 1993 |
| 54 | "Listening to Big Sister" (Japanese: おねえ様に服従だゾ) | June 14, 1993 |
| 54 | "Today is Father's Day" (Japanese: きょうは父の日だゾ) | June 14, 1993 |
Shin-chan meets a politician at a retirement home and gets him in trouble with the media by asking him embarrassing questions. Keiko's niece Fumie visits Shin-chan to take care of him while Misae is out. Fumie lies to Shin-chan that she is his sister and makes him do what she says. Misae and Shin-chan forget that it is Father's Day and make Hiroshi do their work. But later, they get gifts for him and make him happy.
| 55 | "A Man Can Cook" (Japanese: 男の料理を作るゾ) | June 21, 1993 |
| 55 | "Mummy Has a Toothache" (Japanese: 母ちゃんの歯痛だゾ) | June 21, 1993 |
| 55 | "Going to Look at Wedding Dresses" (Japanese: 結婚衣装を見に行くゾ) | June 21, 1993 |
Hiroshi and Shin-chan prepare food together. Shin-chan adds some orange juice in the food for fun, which enhances the flavor of the meal. Misae suffers from a toothache and hides it from Shin-chan. Upon finding out about it, Shin-chan takes Misae to the dentist. Keiko, Shin-chan, and Misae visit a store to purchase a wedding gown. Keiko meets her neighbor and invites him to her wedding party.
| 56 | "Playing with a Bully Again" (Japanese: いじめっ子と又遊ぶゾ) | June 28, 1993 |
| 56 | "Attending a Wedding Ceremony" (Japanese: 結婚式に出席するゾ) | June 28, 1993 |
| 56 | "A Wedding Party" (Japanese: 結婚パーティーだゾ) | June 28, 1993 |
Takeshi asks Shin-chan and Masao to take him to Masao's house, but Shin-chan takes him to his house where Takeshi's mother scolds Takeshi. Hiroshi and his family arrive at the wedding ceremony before the bride and the groom do.
| 57 | "I Can't Sleep" (Japanese: こわくて眠れないゾ) | July 5, 1993 |
| 57 | "Pool Cleaning Is Fun" (Japanese: プール掃除で遊んじゃうゾ) | July 5, 1993 |
| 57 | "We Won a Trip to Guam" (Japanese: グァム旅行が当たったゾ) | July 5, 1993 |
Shin-chan watches a horror movie before going to bed and gets scared at night. In the end, Shin-chan sleeps with Hiroshi. The principal, Matsuzaka, and Yoshinaga decide to clean the swimming pool. Shin-chan also joins them in cleaning. Misae, Hiroshi, and Shin-chan win a vacation as a prize for playing a quiz. The family practice speaking English to prepare.
| SPECIAL–3 | "Travel to Guam with My Family" (Japanese: オラ達家族でグアム旅行だゾ) | July 12, 1993 |
| SPECIAL–3 | "First Time on an Airplane" (Japanese: 初めて飛行機に乗ったゾ) | July 12, 1993 |
| SPECIAL–3 | "Come to Guam" (Japanese: グアムに来ちゃったゾ) | July 12, 1993 |
| SPECIAL–3 | "Guam is Awesome" (Japanese: グアムはサイコーだゾ) | July 12, 1993 |
Shin-chan, Hiroshi, and Misae arrive at the airport to board the flight to Guam. However, Shin-chan's antics cause them to nearly miss their flight. While on the flight, Shin-chan, Hiroshi and Misae eat too many meals and get sick. Shin-chan and family finally arrive to Guam and enjoy the beach and sunset. Shin-chan and family continue their sightseeing in Guam and purchase some affordable souvenirs before heading back home.
| 58 | "Balloons, Balloons" (Japanese: 風船をふくらますゾ) | July 19, 1993 |
| 58 | "I Found a Wallet" (Japanese: おサイフを拾ったゾ) | July 19, 1993 |
| 58 | "I Go Sightseeing with Granddad in Tokyo!" (Japanese: じいちゃんと東京見物だゾ) | July 19, 1993 |
Shin-chan insists that his mother blow balloons for him and doesn't let her relax. So, Misae blows all the balloons and plays with Shin-chan. Shin-chan and Nene-chan find a wallet on the ground. Shin-chan gets a reward for returning his mother's wallet. Shin-chan's grandparents take Shin-chan on a sightseeing trip in Tokyo. They all enjoy themselves and return home in the evening.
| 59 | "Eating Shaved Ice" (Japanese: かき氷を食べるゾ) | July 26, 1993 |
| 59 | "Injection for Shiro" (Japanese: シロのお注射だゾ) | July 26, 1993 |
| 59 | "Family Camping" (Japanese: 家族でキャンプだゾ) | July 26, 1993 |
As it is hot, Shin-chan forces Misae to buy an ice crusher. He eats too much shaved ice and gets a stomachache. Shin-chan and Kawamura take their dogs for a vaccination. Shiro, courageously, steps forward and gets himself injected. Shin-chan and his family go camping. They set up a tent, cook food and stay awake at night as it rains. And in the morning, they all fall asleep.
| 60 | "The Next Bigtime Singer" (Japanese: 将来は人気歌手だゾ) | August 2, 1993 |
| 60 | "Continue Drawing Train Tracks" (Japanese: 線路は続いちゃうゾ) | August 2, 1993 |
| 60 | "What a Hot Night" (Japanese: 暑い暑い熱帯夜だゾ) | August 2, 1993 |
Misae takes Shin-chan to a music school to train him, but she gets angry with the teacher, and they return home. Shin-chan and his friends decide to play the train game and draw tracks on the road. Kazama returns home while the rest enjoy the game. As it is hot, the family resolves to sleep under one fan. But in the night, the fan stops working, and a mosquito disturbs them.
| 61 | "Miss Yoshinaga's Private Life" (Japanese: よしなが先生の私生活だゾ) | August 9, 1993 |
| 61 | "Final Encounter with the Saleslady" (Japanese: 最後のセールスレディだゾ) | August 9, 1993 |
| 61 | "Buying an Air Conditioner" (Japanese: エアコンを買うゾ) | August 9, 1993 |
Shin-chan stays at Yoshinaga's house and snoops in her room to find something different, but Yoshinaga stops him. A sales girl, Urima, follows Shin-chan around to try and sell a set of books and CDs to Misae. She loses track of Shin-chan and gives up. Misae, Hiroshi, and Shin-chan decide to buy an A/C. But Misae finds out that the price of the A/C will drop after a year. So, she drops the idea of buying it.
| 62 | "To the Petrol Station" (Japanese: ガソリンスタンドへ行くゾ) | August 16, 1993 |
| 62 | "Full of Watermelons" (Japanese: スイカがいっぱいだゾ) | August 16, 1993 |
| 62 | "How to Cut a Watermelon" (Japanese: スイカ割りをやるゾ) | August 16, 1993 |
Hiroshi and Shin-chan go to a petrol pump to refuel. Shin-chan troubles Shinobu who happened to be working there and gets her fired. While Shin-chan's grandfather sends watermelons for Shin-chan, Misae and Hiroshi also bring watermelons home. They all have watermelon for dinner. The family plays the 'break the watermelon' game. Shin-chan succeeds in breaking the watermelon and wins the game.
| 63 | "Matsuzaka-sensei's Date" (Japanese: まつざか先生のデートだゾ) | August 23, 1993 |
| 63 | "Practicing sumo!" (Japanese: お相撲のけいこだゾ) | August 23, 1993 |
| 63 | "I Do My Best at Sumo!" (Japanese: 相撲大会でガンバるゾ) | August 23, 1993 |
Shin-chan interrupts Matsuzaka and her boyfriend's date. So, Matsuzaka takes Shin-chan along with her and returns home. Hiroshi trains Shin-chan for a sumo wrestling match held for the kids. Shin-chan drops the washed clothes rack on the ground, for which Hiroshi gets a beating. Shin-chan gets into a competition with a strong trained child wrestler, Taro, and wins the match.
| 64 | "I go to the police station!" (Japanese: ケーサツへ行くゾ) | August 30, 1993 |
| 64 | "I go to collect insects!" (Japanese: 昆虫採集に行くゾ) | August 30, 1993 |
| 64 | "Cleaning up with Mom!" (Japanese: 母ちゃんとおソージだゾ) | August 30, 1993 |
Hiroshi and Shin-chan go to the police station to renew Hiroshi's driving license, but Shin-chan annoys the lady officer in charge with his mischief. Shin-chan, Masao, and Bo-chan go on a trek to find insects. Shin-chan kicks a tree and, fortunately, finds an insect. Hiroshi complains about the mess in the house. So, the next day, Misae and Shin-chan clean the house and surprise Hiroshi.
| 65 | "Damaged by a typhoon!" (Japanese: 台風で水害だゾ) | September 6, 1993 |
| 65 | "I confront a leader of a group of bad girls!" (Japanese: スケバンと対決だゾ) | September 6, 1993 |
| 65 | "I beat you at dodge ball!" (Japanese: ドッジボールで勝負だゾ) | September 6, 1993 |
Due to heavy rain, Misae moves the clothes from the ground floor to the first floor. But she forgets to close the tap, which results in a flood. Shin-chan plays with the girls from the Saitama Crimson Scorpions. The rivals of the Crimson Scorpions find the girls immature and go home. Shin-chan and his friends have a dodgeball competition with the senior students. Shin-chan and his friends win the match.
| 66 | "I am a detective!" (Japanese: オラは刑事さんだゾ) | September 13, 1993 |
| 66 | "An ambulance at the hospital!" (Japanese: 救急車で入院だゾ) | September 13, 1993 |
| 66 | "I'm popular at the hospital!" (Japanese: 病院でも人気者だゾ) | September 13, 1993 |
Shin-chan and his friends play detective and help Yoshinaga find her lost sandal that was stolen by a dog. Shin-chan eats too many snacks at night and complains of abdominal pain. So, Hiroshi and Misae take him to the hospital in an ambulance. The other patients give Shin-chan sweets as a farewell gift. Shin-chan eats the sweets and falls sick again.
| 67 | "Welcome newlyweds!" (Japanese: 新婚さんいらっしゃいだゾ) | September 20, 1993 |
| 67 | "Training for a race!" (Japanese: かけっこの特訓だゾ) | September 20, 1993 |
| 67 | "I shoot an athletic meet on video!" (Japanese: 運動会のビデオ撮影だゾ) | September 20, 1993 |
Keiko meets Shin-chan while Misae is out and spends time with Shin-chan while waiting for Misae. On a Sunday, Hiroshi and Misae train Shin-chan for a race. But Shin-chan does not pay attention. During Shin-chan's sports event, Hiroshi shoots a video of Shin-chan to show Shin-chan's grandparents. But Misae accidentally tapes Action Mask over Hiroshi's recording, destroying Hiroshi's efforts.
| SPECIAL–4 | "Invincible Kuntam Robo" (Japanese: 無敵のカンタムロボだゾ) | September 27, 1993 |
| SPECIAL–4 | "Preparing for a Play" (Japanese: お芝居のおケイコだゾ) | September 27, 1993 |
| SPECIAL–4 | "Getting Rid of Demons" (Japanese: オラの鬼退治だゾ) | September 27, 1993 |
| SPECIAL–4 | "Shiro’s First Love" (Japanese: シロの初恋物語だゾ) | September 27, 1993 |
| SPECIAL–4 | "Ōedo Land: Heaven Chapter" (Japanese: 大江戸ランド 天の巻だゾ) | September 27, 1993 |
| SPECIAL–4 | "Ōedo Land: Earth Chapter" (Japanese: 大江戸ランド 地の巻だゾ) | September 27, 1993 |
| SPECIAL–4 | "A Bonus" (Japanese: おまけだゾ) | September 27, 1993 |
As the Midnight Gang once again threatens to destroy Planet Earth, Kuntam Robo and his friend combine their powers and defeat the Midnight Gang. / The Sunflower Class rehearse the story of Momotaro to perform at the Spring Games. Yoshinaga chooses Kazama for the role of Momotaro, while Shin-chan is chosen as a tree. / Shin-chan plays the role of a tree who saves Momotaro from a demon’s trap. Kazama wakes Shin-chan from his dream. / ?? / The Nohara family go on a trip to Edo Land. A ninja welcomes them to his castle as part of their package. While searching for the lobby, Misae and Hiroshi get trapped. / Shin-chan and Hiroshi go look for Misae. They learn that the villains have trapped Misae as part of their trip package. Some villagers help Hiroshi and Shin-chan fight the villains and rescue Misae. /
| 68 | "Mom is on a diet!" (Japanese: 母ちゃんのダイエットだゾ) | October 4, 1993 |
| 68 | "I go to the sports club!" (Japanese: アスレチックするゾ) | October 4, 1993 |
| 68 | "Dad lost his eyebrows!" (Japanese: 父ちゃんのマユゲがないゾ) | October 4, 1993 |
Misae tries hard to lose weight and plans a diet. But she fails to resist her food cravings and eats herself full. The school organizes an athletic event for its students. At the end, all the students get a pack of snacks as a reward for completing the given task. While Hiroshi sleeps, Shin-chan trims Hiroshi's eyebrows. Later, Misae and Shin-chan come up with ideas to rectify the problem.
| 69 | "I carry a portable shrine!" (Japanese: おみこしをかつぐゾ) | October 11, 1993 |
| 69 | "I take part in a flea market!" (Japanese: フリーマーケットに参加だゾ) | October 11, 1993 |
| 69 | "I do business at the flea market!" (Japanese: フリーマーケットで商売だゾ) | October 11, 1993 |
Shin-chan and his group create a portable shrine and decorate it with flowers, animal pictures, and Shin-chan's Kuntam Robot for a competition. Misae, Shin-chan, and Hiroshi gather the unwanted things present in the house that can be sold in a flea market and find Shin-chan's baby toys. Misae, Keiko, and Shin-chan put up a stall to sell their things. Shin-chan barters his old toys for better ones.
| 70 | "I fix the drain spout!" (Japanese: 雨どいの修理だゾ) | October 18, 1993 |
| 70 | "I love sushi!" (Japanese: 特上寿司は好みだゾ) | October 18, 1993 |
| 70 | "My brother, the chickee!" (Japanese: オラの弟はヒヨコだゾ) | October 18, 1993 |
Hiroshi climbs the roof to repair the broken pipe, but loses his balance because of Shin-chan's mischief and hangs on the pipe for dear life. Shin-chan goes to Nene-chan's house for lunch and eats half the food prepared. Moeko consoles herself by singing and dancing. Shin-chan finds a left out chick and takes it home. He goes to return the chick back, but the vendor gives it to him.
| 71 | "I find a chicken!" (Japanese: ニワトリさんを探すゾ) | October 25, 1993 |
| 71 | "I help with the washing!" (Japanese: お洗濯を手伝うゾ) | October 25, 1993 |
| 71 | "I go to the newlyweds' home!" (Japanese: 新婚さんちへ行くゾ) | October 25, 1993 |
Shin-chan takes his chick to school and leaves it in the poultry farm. The chicks and the hen go out from the farm and return on their own. Misae dries the clothes in the house, as it is raining. Later, when it gets sunny, she washes all the dirty clothes with Shin-chan's help. Keiko invites Misae and her family to her new house. Shin-chan finds a room with toys and has fun playing with Satoshi.
| 72 | "Let's play school!" (Japanese: 学校ごっこをするゾ) | November 1, 1993 |
| 72 | "Let's have a BBQ!" (Japanese: バーベキューするゾ) | November 1, 1993 |
| 72 | "Dad is tired!" (Japanese: 父ちゃんはお疲れだゾ) | November 1, 1993 |
As Misae goes out, Fumie takes care of Shin-chan and teaches him maths while playing school. Shin-chan eats Masao's steak and annoys him while preparing barbecue. So, he gives Masao his share of corn and also entertains him. Hiroshi returns home tired and is worried about his work, so he decides to quit his job. But on seeing Shin-chan, he realizes that he should continue with his job.
| 73 | "Mom in her schoolgirl outfit!" (Japanese: セーラー服母ちゃんだゾ) | November 8, 1993 |
| 73 | "I play with the model house!" (Japanese: モデルハウスで遊ぶゾ) | November 8, 1993 |
| 73 | "I select a family photo!" (Japanese: 家族写真をとるゾ) | November 8, 1993 |
Misae finds her school uniform and wears it. The principal notices Misae and embarrasses her. Sumitakunaru sets up her model house with the latest technology in the hope of getting a good customer. But Shin-chan and his friends chase the customer away. Misae and Hiroshi visit the photo studio to take a family picture. But Shin-chan ruins the pictures with his mischievous poses.
| 74 | "I try my hand at sewing!" (Japanese: ぬい物をするゾ) | November 15, 1993 |
| 74 | "I hate getting shots!" (Japanese: お注射はキライだゾ) | November 15, 1993 |
| 74 | "Taking care of the guest!" (Japanese: お客様をもてなすゾ) | November 15, 1993 |
Shin-chan learns the art of stitching. And when Misae falls asleep, Shin-chan stitches the clothes from the house. At school, the doctor diverts children's attention so as to vaccinate them. But Shin-chan builds a conversation with the doctor to avoid the injection. Misae prepares food for Kawaguchi on his sudden visit. After having food, Kawaguchi and Shin-chan play together and have fun.
| 75 | "Don't praise me so much!" (Japanese: ほめ殺しはつらいゾ) | November 22, 1993 |
| 75 | "Dad really hates cats!" (Japanese: 父ちゃんは猫ギライだゾ) | November 22, 1993 |
| 75 | "I play at the bookstore again today!" (Japanese: 今日も本屋さんで遊ぶゾ) | November 22, 1993 |
Misae appreciates Shin-chan mistakes instead of correcting him so that he changes his behavior. A cat hurts Hiroshi several times and disturbs him while working. In the night, Hiroshi envies the cat's life as he finds it difficult to complete his work. The bookstore owner and Nakamura prepare to welcome the bookstore inspection officer. But a confusion leads them to not getting their bonus.
| 76 | "I eat ramen" (Japanese: ラーメンを食べるゾ) | November 29, 1993 |
| 76 | "I'm a very talented skater!" (Japanese: スケートの天才だゾ) | November 29, 1993 |
| 76 | "The newlyweds fight!" (Japanese: 新婚さんのケンカだゾ) | November 29, 1993 |
When Misae and Shin-chan go to a restaurant to eat noodles, Shin-chan drops the bowl of noodles on the table while pouring it in his bowl. Hiroshi, Misae, and Shin-chan go for ice skating to get some winter exercise. Shin-chan skates with great ease and impresses an ice skating champion. Keiko runs away to the home of her friend Misae for comfort and advice because Satoshi scolds her for a silly quarrel over cooking. Later, Satoshi apologizes to Keiko and takes her back home.
| 77 | "I Make Some Cookies" (Japanese: クッキーを作るゾ) | December 6, 1993 |
| 77 | "Miss Matsuzaka's Marriage Meeting" (Japanese: まつざか先生のお見合いだゾ) | December 6, 1993 |
| 77 | "Elections Are Sure Rough" (Japanese: 選挙って大変だゾ) | December 6, 1993 |
Misae has long dreamed of being a mother who bakes cookies with her child, but things don't go smoothly when Shin-chan is involved. Shin-chan prepares cookies shaped with Misae, Hiroshi and his face. Shin-chan and his family visit the same fancy restaurant that Matsuzaka and her date are at. Matsuzaka tries hard to hide from Shin-chan, but her behavior annoys her date. A politician is giving a speech on the street, asking passersby for their support in the upcoming election, when Shin-chan interrupts him.
| 78 | "Knitting a Sweater" (Japanese: セーターを編むゾ) | December 13, 1993 |
| 78 | "Riding a Packed Train" (Japanese: 満員電車に乗るゾ) | December 13, 1993 |
| 78 | "Playing at Dad's Office" (Japanese: 父ちゃんの会社で遊ぶゾ) | December 13, 1993 |
Misae unknits Hiroshi's old sweater to make a new one for him but ends up knitting a sweater for Shiro with the same wool. Hiroshi is on his way to work when he encounters Shin-chan, who is playing detective and has followed him to the train station. Shin-chan pesters the passengers in the train with his mischief and his talks. Hiroshi brings Shin-chan to his office. Arriving at the office, Hiroshi tells Shin-chan to wait patiently in the lobby until his mother can come and get him. Shin-chan escapes from the recreational room and meets the president of the company and has fun with him.
| SPECIAL–5 | "A promise to Mom" (Japanese: ママとのお約束条項だゾ) | December 20, 1993 |
| SPECIAL–5 | "Watching an Action Mask Movie" (Japanese: アクション仮面の映画を見るゾ) | December 20, 1993 |
| SPECIAL–5 | "I also like Kuntam Robo" (Japanese: カンタムロボも好きだゾ) | December 20, 1993 |
| SPECIAL–5 | "A Kindergarten Christmas party" (Japanese: 幼稚園のクリスマス会だゾ) | December 20, 1993 |
| SPECIAL–5 | "I want an Xmas gift" (Japanese: X'マスプレゼントが欲しいゾ) | December 20, 1993 |
| SPECIAL–5 | "A winter country adventure" (Japanese: 冬の国の冒険だゾ) | December 20, 1993 |
| 79 | "Fashion Show Adventure" (Japanese: ファッションショーに出るゾ) | December 27, 1993 |
| 79 | "Kindergarten Spring Cleaning" (Japanese: 幼稚園の大そうじだゾ) | December 27, 1993 |
| 79 | "The Sound of New Year's Eve" (Japanese: 除夜のカネを聞くゾ) | December 27, 1993 |
Kei invites Misae and Shin-chan to a fashion show, where Shin-chan is chosen by a fashion designer as a last-minute substitute for a child model who is ill. However, Shin-chan gets nervous and ruins the fashion show. As the year comes to an end, Shin-chan’s class is supposed to clean the school today, but Shin-chan has his own unique approach. Shin-chan has a conversation with his friends in the park about the ringing of the New Year's Eve bells. He stays awake until 12 am to hear the bells and then falls asleep.

== 1994 ==
| No. | Title | Original release date |
|---|---|---|
| 80 | "Receiving Red Packets" (Japanese: おとし玉をもらったゾ) | January 10, 1994 |
| 80 | "Shopping With Red Packet Money" (Japanese: おとし玉で買物だゾ) | January 10, 1994 |
| 80 | "Here come the Grandparents" (Japanese: じいちゃん達が来たゾ) | January 10, 1994 |
Misae gives Shin-chan a ball instead of a coin on New Year's day. Later, as Misae breaks the ball, she gives him a real coin. Shin-chan goes shopping but doesn't spend his New Year coin. He saves the coin and admires it even in his sleep. Shin-chan’s grandparents arrive for a visit without warning determined to enjoy their grandson, even if it makes Misae’s life more difficult. Shin-chan and his grandfather agree to help Misae in cleaning but add to the mess.
| 81 | "Going for a Ski Trip" (Japanese: スキーバス旅行だゾ) | January 17, 1994 |
| 81 | "Après-Ski" (Japanese: アフタースキーだゾ) | January 17, 1994 |
| 81 | "My whole family is Skiing" (Japanese: 家族でスキーだゾ) | January 17, 1994 |
The school takes the students and their families for skiing. Matsuzaka doesn't know how to ski but she tries her best. The principal sends everyone back to the hotel to get some rest. Shin-chan and his friends see Matsuzaka performing in a nightclub and join her. The Nohara family is at a ski resort, but Shin-chan causes problems that interfere with his parents’ attempts to ski.
| 82 | "Ways to avoid being late" (Japanese: チコク防止作戦だゾ) | January 24, 1994 |
| 82 | "Masao's love" (Japanese: マサオくんの恋だゾ) | January 24, 1994 |
| 82 | "Let's make natto and rice!" (Japanese: 納豆ゴハンを作るゾ) | January 24, 1994 |
Shin-chan often oversleeps and misses the school bus. Misae resents having to take him to kindergarten on her bicycle, so she devises a plan and wakes him up. But she receives a call from Yoshinaga telling her that the bus has broken down. Masao has a crush on Megumi, a girl from the other kindergarten class, but he’s too shy to speak to her. Shin-chan is hungry after playing outside, but Misae is entertaining guests and can’t make anything for him. Shin-chan finds it difficult to control his hunger and prepares a meal for himself.
| 83 | "Playing at a girls' school!" (Japanese: 女子校で遊ぶゾ) | January 31, 1994 |
| 83 | "Call me Pencil Shin-chan" (Japanese: オラはエンピツしんちゃんだゾ) | January 31, 1994 |
| 83 | "Mimicking the Television" (Japanese: テレビの口まねだゾ) | January 31, 1994 |
Shin-chan goes to the girls school where the Saitama Crimson Scorpions study without informing Misae. So, he gets scolding from her. Shin-chan and Shiro enter a random house and spends their day there. Later, Misae tells Shin-chan about the new show Pencil Shin-chan. Misae tries to keep Shin-chan away from the craze of the Pencil Shin-chan program but Shin-chan gets busy watching Action Mask.
| 84 | "The lottery!" (Japanese: 宝クジを当てるゾ) | February 7, 1994 |
| 84 | "Let's go to a funeral!" (Japanese: おそうしきに行くゾ) | February 7, 1994 |
| 84 | "A snowball fight" (Japanese: 雪合戦で勝負だゾ) | February 7, 1994 |
After reading a magazine horoscope, Misae decides to buy a lottery ticket. Misae, Hiroshi and Shin-chan each dream of what they would do if they won. But Shin-chan receives a jumbo Chocobi packet along with a t-shirt, whereas Misae and Hiroshi do not win anything. The Nohara family has to attend a funeral, and Shin-chan is warned to behave himself. However, he is not quite sure what behavior is required as Shin-chan disturbs everyone by playing the instruments. The two kindergarten classes start a snowball fight, which brings out the personal animosity between Ms. Yoshinaga and Ms. Matsuzaka.
| 85 | "I'm changing my hairstyle!" (Japanese: オラ髪形を変えるゾ) | February 14, 1994 |
| 85 | "Visiting Kazama-kun at his illness!" (Japanese: 風間くんをお見舞いするゾ) | February 14, 1994 |
| 85 | "The chairman's house is a villa!" (Japanese: 課長の家は新築だゾ) | February 14, 1994 |
Misae decides to cut Shin-chan’s hair. She sets up a chair in his room and tells him that they are going to play barbershop. While cutting Shin-chan's hair, Misae shaves a portion of his head bald. So, Misae draws a black spot with the marker to cover it. Shin-chan and Nene go to visit Kazama, who is home sick with a cold. However, Kazama is irritated by Shin-chan’s presence. Shin-chan troubles Kazama and makes him run. As a result, Kazama's body temperature drops down and he feels good. Hiroshi’s boss has just built a new house and holds a housewarming party. The Nohara family attends, but Shin-chan can’t help disrupting the event.
| 86 | "Hatena is a mysterious cat!" (Japanese: ハテナは謎の猫だゾ) | February 21, 1994 |
| 86 | "Cleaning your ears feels good!" (Japanese: 耳ソージは気持ちいいゾ) | February 21, 1994 |
| 86 | "Misae's class reunion" (Japanese: みさえの同窓会だゾ) | February 21, 1994 |
Hatena the cat is stealing Shiro’s food. Bo and Shin-chan follow her, trying to figure out where she lives. When Hiroshi doesn’t respond to Misae’s voice, it seems that he needs to have wax removed from his ears. Shin-chan wants his ears cleaned, too. Shin-chan follows Misae to Tokyo for her class reunion, where she get a surprise when she meets her old crush, Mogi.
| 87 | "The softball tournament part 1" (Japanese: ソフトボール大会だゾその1) | February 28, 1994 |
| 87 | "The softball tournament part 2" (Japanese: ソフトボール大会だゾその2!) | February 28, 1994 |
| 87 | "A divorce at the Nohara house" (Japanese: 野原家のリコンだゾ) | February 28, 1994 |
The principal of the kindergarten proposes an inter-class softball game, but things start to go wrong during practice when a teacher breaks a window. Shin-chan begins the baseball match by batting first. And later, he does a good fielding and gets Kawamura out of the game. A televised debate program prompts a quarrel between Misae and Hiroshi, one that escalates quickly. Can this marriage be saved? What can Shin-chan do? Later, they patch up.
| 88 | "Taking a bath by myself" (Japanese: ひとりでお風呂だゾ) | March 7, 1994 |
| 88 | "It's a tricycle race!" (Japanese: 三輪車でレースだゾ) | March 7, 1994 |
| 88 | "Eating at a 'baikingu'!" (Japanese: バイキングを食べるゾ) | March 7, 1994 |
In preparation for bath time, Misae asks Shin-chan to check the temperature of the water, but Shin-chan has trouble accomplishing this all by himself. Bullies called the Black Thunders try to chase Shin-chan and his friends out of the park. Their leader, Wolf, challenges Shin-chan to a tricycle race. Although the group leader wins the challenge, Shin-chan rides the cycle like a bike and impresses everyone. At a posh hotel buffet dinner, the Noharas are ecstatic over the fancy food. Seeing caviar for the first time, Shin-chan makes a unique comment.
| 89 | "I enjoy the art in a museum!" (Japanese: 美術館でゲージツだゾ) | March 14, 1994 |
| 89 | "I'm Kazama-kun!" (Japanese: オラは風間くんだゾ) | March 14, 1994 |
| 89 | "I entertain the director!" (Japanese: 部長さんを接待するゾ) | March 14, 1994 |
When the Noharas visit an art museum, they voice their opinions on the art loudly and frankly, not realizing that the artist is right next to them. Hence, the artist gets frustrated and leaves the museum. Shin-chan and friends decide to play "kindergarten," with Shin-chan playing Kazama’s role, Nene as the teacher Ms. Yoshinaga, and Kazama as Shin-chan. Hiroshi brings his boss home after work. Unlike the nervous Misae, Shin-chan seems quite relaxed. Will Shin-chan be rude to the boss? Hiroshi and his boss along with Shin-chan have fun together.
| 90 | "Dad is sick!" (Japanese: 父ちゃんが病気だゾ / /) | March 21, 1994 |
| 90 | "Putting on makeup is fun!" (Japanese: お化粧は楽しいゾ) | March 21, 1994 |
| 90 | "I get a brother!" (Japanese: オラの弟ができたゾ) | March 21, 1994 |
Taking over for Misae who is out buying cold medicine, Shin-chan "takes care of" his sick father, as if Hiroshi isn’t miserable enough already. Shin-chan and Misae show up at the cosmetics counter where Shinobu works part time. Shinobu’s patience wears thin with Shin-chan’s antics. Misae feels ill during dinner. Could Shin-chan soon become a big brother? Hiroshi and Misae ponder this. The next day, Misae goes to the hospital. But she gets to know that it was because of overeating.
| 91 | "Ooedo Land - Tale of Fire!" (Japanese: 大江戸ランド火の巻だゾ) | April 4, 1994 |
| 91 | "Ooedo Land - Tale of Water!" (Japanese: 大江戸ランド水の巻だゾ) | April 4, 1994 |
| 91 | "I go out even though it is windy!" (Japanese: 強風でも出かけるゾ) | April 4, 1994 |
The Noharas win a ticket to Oedo Land, a samurai theme park where they can pretend to be feudal lords. Shin-chan enacts a king, Hiroshi a servant and Misae a normal mother. Shin-chan and his family enact common people of the olden times. Hiroshi and Shin-chan fight the goons and save Misae. Shin-chan ignores Misae’s warnings and heads to Masao's house on a windy day. Shin-chan, caught in a gust of wind, is unable to get anywhere.
| 92 | "Flower viewing is dangerous!" (Japanese: お花見はアブナいゾ) | April 11, 1994 |
| 92 | "A long, tedious conversation is annoying!" (Japanese: 長話はメイワクだゾ) | April 11, 1994 |
| 92 | "I have a craving for ramen" (Japanese: ラーメンが急に食べたいゾ) | April 11, 1994 |
Shin-chan and his family go for a picnic and spend time with a gangster and his bodyguards. Yoshinaga goes to change her clothes at Misae's place and forgets about the children in the bus. Shin-chan watches a noodles advertisement and feels the urge of eating noodles. He takes help from a neighbor and prepares noodles.
| 93 | "Putting my heart into calligraphy!" (Japanese: 書道で心をのにするゾ) | April 18, 1994 |
| 93 | "Cleaning up the Kotatsu!" (Japanese: こたつを片づけるゾ) | April 18, 1994 |
| 93 | "It's the introduction to the Buri Buri Movie!" (Japanese: ブリブリ映画紹介だゾ) | April 18, 1994 |
?? / ?? / It is the introduction to the Buri Buri Movie!, an introduction to one of the Crayon Shin-chan movies starring Shinnosuke Nohara and Buriburizaemon.
| 94 | "I beat you at gathering shellfish!" (Japanese: 潮干狩で勝負だゾ) | April 25, 1994 |
| 94 | "Dreadful payday!" (Japanese: ひさんな給料日だゾ) | April 25, 1994 |
| 94 | "Great stingy plan!" (Japanese: ケチケチ大作戦だゾ) | April 25, 1994 |
The kindergarten class goes shell hunting at the beach. Ms. Yoshinaga’s Sunflower class and Ms. Matsuzaka’s Rose class battle to find the most shells. / On payday, Misae joyfully withdraws their monthly salary from the bank and returns home, only to find that the envelope she put the money in is gone. Hiroshi consoles her but feels sad from within. / Misae plans her monthly expenses and cuts down on food, electricity, water, and other expenses and promises to be careful with money.
| 95 | "I play house with the leader of the gang!" (Japanese: 組長とままごとだゾ) | May 2, 1994 |
| 95 | "Mom has no driver's license!" (Japanese: 母ちゃんは運転免許がないゾ) | May 2, 1994 |
| 95 | "Let's learn how to drive!" (Japanese: 運転免許の教習だゾ) | May 2, 1994 |
The kids play a restaurant game in school and make the principal a child. The principal joins them with the intention of learning something new. / Misae decides to learn driving and gets herself enrolled in a motor driving school. She fails the first test. / Misae goes for her driving class along with Shin-chan. Shin-Chan hangs out in a children's room with toy cars. Shin renders these cars as 'lame'. Shin-Chan then drives out of the room and on to the actual course distracting Misae and crashing the car into a sign by the curb. The instructor flunks and refuses to give Misae license because of Shin-chan's mischief.
| 96 | "I want to eat expensive sweets!" (Japanese: 高級お菓子が食べたいゾ) | May 9, 1994 |
| 96 | "Miss Matsuzaka is tired!" (Japanese: まつざか先生はお疲れだゾ) | May 9, 1994 |
| 96 | "Mom ran away from home!" (Japanese: 母ちゃんの家出だゾ) | May 9, 1994 |
Misae hides the fancy cookies she bought for guests where Shin-chan can’t find them, but he soon hunts them down. A battle to grab the cookies begins! Later, they eat the cookies together. / After school, Ms. Matsuzaka runs into Shin-chan, who asks to see her home. She says that it’s a luxury apartment, when in fact it’s old and run-down! / Hiroshi and Misae get into a fight about money. Suddenly, Misae is missing. Could she have run away? Worried, Hiroshi and Shin-chan search for her. But, Misae sleeps in the cabinet.
| 97 | "Special lessons in traffic rules!" (Japanese: 交通ルールの特訓だゾ) | May 16, 1994 |
| 97 | "I want to see an alien!" (Japanese: 宇宙人に会いたいゾ) | May 16, 1994 |
| 97 | "My autograph book!" (Japanese: オラのサイン本だゾ) | May 16, 1994 |
Misae takes driving training from Shin-chan as he is knowledgeable of it. Shin-chan puts traffic signs all over the house as part of the training. / Shin-chan and his friends assume a UFO to be in the sky. But they realize that it is a balloon created to advertise Action Mask. A famous writer visits the bookstore. Shin-chan befriends the writer and impresses him.
| 98 | "Changing wardrobes at the change of seasons!" (Japanese: 衣がえをするゾ) | May 23, 1994 |
| 98 | "Lunch is barbecued beef!" (Japanese: ランチは焼き肉だゾ) | May 23, 1994 |
| 98 | "The racetrack is fun!" (Japanese: 競馬場はおもしろいゾ) | May 23, 1994 |
Shin-chan watches Misae cutting a long pant short. And later, after Misae goes out to attend a call, Shin-chan cuts all the clothes short. / Misae and Shin-chan go to a restaurant and share the table with Moeko and Nene-chan. They end up eating the dish ordered by Moeko. / Hiroshi and his family go to a race course to watch a horse race. The horse that Misae bets on, wins the race.
| 99 | "Riding my bicycle to kindergarten is fun!" (Japanese: 自転車通園楽しいゾ) | May 30, 1994 |
| 99 | "Mom will get her driver's license!" (Japanese: 運転免許がとれるゾ) | May 30, 1994 |
| 99 | "I go for a drive with Mom!" (Japanese: 母ちゃんとドライブだゾ) | May 30, 1994 |
Shin-chan misses the kindergarten bus, so Misae has to take him by bike. While waiting at a red light, a beautiful woman pulls up alongside them. / Misae is nervous before her driving test. When she finds out the childcare center is closed, Shin-chan must also come along. Will Misae pass her test? She drives well, keeping the traffic rules in mind. Hence, she passes the test. / Misae gets her driving license and decides to drop Shin-chan to school in the car. However, she reaches the expressway and returns home in the night.
| 100 | "Good boy, Shin-chan!" (Japanese: 良い子のしんちゃんだゾ) | June 6, 1994 |
| 100 | "I go bowling!" (Japanese: ボウリングをするゾ) | June 6, 1994 |
| 100 | "I take care of Sabu-chan!" (Japanese: サブちゃんのお世話だゾ) | June 6, 1994 |
Shin-chan gets yelled at by Misae for being a bad boy. He opens the fridge and drinks alcohol by mistake, which transforms him into a good boy. Misae and Hiroshi feel happy on seeing Shin-chan's changed behavior. / Hiroshi and his family go bowling. Shin-chan scores a strike. Misae gets angry as Hiroshi and Shin-chan do not watch her play. / Neighbor Mrs. Ujuin keeps her dog at Misae's place and goes to France for a holiday. Shin-chan gives a changes look to the dog by cutting her hair.
| 101 | "I go to Tokyo Dome!" (Japanese: 東京ドームへ行くゾ) | June 13, 1994 |
| 101 | "Strict rules of the girl leader of the group of bad kids!" (Japanese: スケバンの掟は厳しいゾ) | June 13, 1994 |
| 101 | "A love letter from the girl leader of a group of bad kids!" (Japanese: スケバンのラブレターだゾ) | June 13, 1994 |
Hiroshi and his family go to Tokyo Dome to watch a baseball match. They, unknowingly, sit with the opposite team fans. / A local girl gang meets at the park where Shin-chan is playing. The leader takes off in order to chase her crush despite love being against the rules. / The Saitama group girls discuss their weekly routine. Ryuko decides to take help from a boy. But when she sees the boy hurt an old lady, she changes her mind.
| 102 | "I play with Dad!" (Japanese: 父ちゃんと遊んでやるゾ) | June 20, 1994 |
| 102 | "Mountain climbing is tough!" (Japanese: 山のぼりはつらいゾ) | June 20, 1994 |
| 102 | "The food section at the department store is fun!" (Japanese: 食品売り場は楽しいゾ) | June 20, 1994 |
Hiroshi has to play golf with work associates instead of going on a hiking trip with the family. He does his best to slip past Shin-chan unnoticed But Shin-chan gets to know. So, Hiroshi plays with him. / Hiroshi and his family go hiking. They choose the difficult road and click a picture together. The next morning, they suffer from body pain. / Shin-chan visits a supermarket with Misae. He sticks 100 percent discount stickers on the things.
| 103 | "Going to the zoo!" (Japanese: 動物園で遊んじゃうゾ) | June 27, 1994 |
| 103 | "I'm going to be on a live broadcast!" (Japanese: 生中継に出演するゾ) | June 27, 1994 |
| 103 | "Being a carpenter is tough!" (Japanese: 大工さんは大変だゾ) | June 27, 1994 |
Hiroshi, Misae, and Shin-chan visit the zoo and click pictures. Shin-chan and Hiroshi are more interested in the pretty girls around them than the zoo animals. Shin-chan plays with the lemur and gets a beating from Misae. / A TV channel asks the Futaba Kindergarten students to create a formation that spells Kasukabe. But when the show goes live, Shin-chan moves from his place and spoils the show. / A contractor and his assistant visit Misae's house to repair the roof. In the night, Shiro's house leaks.
| 104 | "I run away from home" (Japanese: オラ家出しちゃうゾ) | July 4, 1994 |
| 104 | "I do my best at the swim meet" (Japanese: 水泳大会がんばるゾ) | July 4, 1994 |
| 104 | "I'm good at Pachinko" (Japanese: オラはパチンコの名人だゾ) | July 4, 1994 |
Shin-chan leaves the house because he gets angry on Misae. But he returns home to eat the cakes brought by Misae. / The school organizes a swimming competition. Masao gets scared to swim. But due to the fear in his mind, he swims at a good speed and wins the race. / Hiroshi, Misae, and Shin-chan go to a video game parlour. While Hiroshi and Misae lose all their money, Shin-chan wins the game.
| 105 | "Easy Going Mom!" (Japanese: お気楽母ちゃんだゾ) | July 11, 1994 |
| 105 | "The lost kitten!" (Japanese: 迷子の子ネコちゃんだゾ) | July 11, 1994 |
| 105 | "I go see a new car!" (Japanese: 新車を見に行くゾ) | July 11, 1994 |
Misae drops Shin-chan to school by cycle and returns home. She wastes her day with the intention of completing her work later. / Shin-chan helps Nene-chan find her lost cat. They go to different places to find the cat. But ultimately, they find her at the fish market. / Hiroshi, Misae, and Shin-chan go to a car showroom to check the new cars. They pester the sales executive and return home.
| 106 | "We will not fear the bullies" (Japanese: いじめっ子には負けないゾ) | July 18, 1994 |
| 106 | "Going to the Beach during Summer is Fun" (Japanese: 夏の海辺は楽しいゾ) | July 18, 1994 |
| 106 | "Going for a boat ride" (Japanese: ボートで遊んじゃうゾ) | July 18, 1994 |
Two goons trouble Masao and snatch his video game. As Masao starts crying, Shin-chan, Kazama and all other friends fight together against the goons and get Masao's game back. / ?? / Shin-chan and Misae go for a boat ride on the beach. They fall asleep in the boat and later realize that they are quite far away from the shore. After a long wait, the boat reaches the shore.
| 107 | "Time for Summer Camp" (Japanese: 夏休みキャンプだゾ) | July 25, 1994 |
| 107 | "A Test of Courage at Camp!" (Japanese: キャンプで肝だめしだゾ) | July 25, 1994 |
| 107 | "Distressed about the melon" (Japanese: メロンで悩んじゃうゾ) | July 25, 1994 |
Shin-chan and his friends go on summer camp. They form a group and make their own tent and also help Yoshinaga in preparing a meal. / The principal asks the students to prove their courage and sends them to stamp a paper in the forest, but Kazama is frightened. / Misae keeps the watermelon for dinner, but Shin-chan eats it. Later, he puts the blame on Shiro, but gets caught by his mother.
| 108 | "Hiroshi struggles to sleep" (Japanese: 父ちゃんは眠れないゾ) | August 1, 1994 |
| 108 | "Escape from the Rain with Big Sister" (Japanese: お姉さんと雨やどりだゾ) | August 1, 1994 |
| 108 | "Watching the sea lion show" (Japanese: アシカのショーだゾ) | August 1, 1994 |
Hiroshi decides to sleep early as he needs to wake up early, but Shin-chan gives Hiroshi an energy drink and keeps him awake. Hiroshi leaves for his office trip and dozes off during his journey. / While taking shelter from the rain, Shin-chan flirts with a young woman named Himeko, much to her annoyance. Later, they take a ride from her mom and run into Misae./ Hiroshi and Misae take Shin-chan to watch the sea lion show. Shin-chan gets excited and also participates in the show. Shin-chan returns home with a sea lion toy.
| 109 | "Outdoor bathtub on a summer day" (Japanese: 暑い日は行水だゾ) | August 8, 1994 |
| 109 | "Making cartoons" (Japanese: マンガ家の助手だゾ) | August 8, 1994 |
| 109 | "An encounter with Action Mask" (Japanese: アクション仮面に再会だゾ) | August 8, 1994 |
On a summer day, Misae pumps air in an outdoor bath tub and fills it with water. Misae, Shin-chan and Hiroshi enjoy in the bath tub. / Misae and Shin-chan help Yoshiko in drawing cartoons. As promised, Yoshiko takes Misae and Shin-chan for a meal to the 5-star hotel. / Yoshiko, Misae and Shin-chan go to an event. Shin-chan sees Action Mask performing live and feels happy and honoured.
| 110 | "Summer vacation picture diary!" (Japanese: 夏休みの絵日記だゾ) | August 15, 1994 |
| 110 | "Public swimming pool is fun!" (Japanese: 市民プールは楽しいゾ) | August 15, 1994 |
| 110 | "Helping Keiko and Satoshi in moving to a new house" (Japanese: お引っ越しを手伝うゾ) | August 15, 1994 |
Misae, Shin-Chan, and Hiroshi go to public indoor pool to swim, Shin beats Hiroshi in a swimming contest.
| 111 | "I go to the post office on an errand" (Japanese: 郵便局におつかいだゾ) | August 22, 1994 |
| 111 | "I go to the Haunted House" (Japanese: おばけ屋敷に入るゾ) | August 22, 1994 |
| 111 | "Shin-chan and Hiroshi do the cooking" (Japanese: 母ちゃんのストライキだゾ) | August 22, 1994 |
Shin-chan goes to the post office and gets diverted. He forgets what he was asked to do and confuses everyone at the post office. / Shin-chan and his family visit a haunted house and get scared when a mummy runs behind them to get rid of his band-aid from their hand. During the chaos, Shin-chan wets his shorts./ Misae gets annoyed due to the house work, so Hiroshi and Shin-chan do the cooking. They realise Misae's situation and thank her.
| 112 | "Growing green peppers" (Japanese: ピーマンを育てるゾ) | August 29, 1994 |
| 112 | "Dad stops smoking" (Japanese: 父ちゃんの禁煙だゾ) | August 29, 1994 |
| 112 | "I go along with Miss Matsuzaka" (Japanese: まつざか先生とご一緒するゾ) | August 29, 1994 |
Misae brings green pepper seeds and asks Shin-chan to plant them. When the green peppers have finished growing, Misae uses them to prepare lunch. / ??? / Matsuzaka goes out in the hope of finding a life partner and meets Shin-chan. They spend an entire day together. Matsuzaka gets upset for not finding a life partner, so Shin-chan consoles her.
| 113 | "I clean my lunch set" (Japanese: 給食セットを洗うゾ) | September 5, 1994 |
| 113 | "I try many kinds of baths" (Japanese: 色んなお風呂に入るゾ) | September 5, 1994 |
| 113 | "I play at Health Land" (Japanese: 健康ランドで遊ぶゾ) | September 5, 1994 |
Shin-chan hides his lunch box in Shiro's house. So, Misae makes him wash the vessels but he ends up messing the entire kitchen. / Hiroshi goes for a sauna bath and leaves the room in just a towel. Misae refuses to recognize him in front of others. / Hiroshi takes Shin-chan and Misae to the health land for a meal. Later, Hiroshi and Misae go for a massage and send Shin-chan to a game parlour.
| 114 | "I look after the lost child" (Japanese: 迷子の世話をするゾ) | September 12, 1994 |
| 114 | "Perfume is evidence of an affair" (Japanese: 香水は浮気のショーコだゾ) | September 12, 1994 |
| 114 | "Asking for forgiveness" (Japanese: 子供のケンカに親が出るゾ) | September 12, 1994 |
Shin-chan gets lost in the crowd and gets reported to the lost kid's department. Shin-chan unites a girl with her mother by announcing on the mic. Later, as Shin-chan feels hungry, he goes to his mother. / ?? / As Mashimaro troubles Nene and her friends, Shin-chan troubles him and makes him cry. After Shin-chan feels sorry, Mashimaro confesses that he was at fault, and they go out to play.
| 115 | "I go fishing on the ship" (Japanese: お船でつりをするゾ) | September 19, 1994 |
| 115 | "I confront a girl prodigy" (Japanese: 天才少女と対決だゾ) | September 19, 1994 |
| 115 | "I go to pick up someone by car" (Japanese: お車でお迎えするゾ) | September 19, 1994 |
Hiroshi takes his family for fishing. Hiroshi experiences motion sickness and vomits, but later, helps Shin-chan catch a big fish. / Shizuka, the trump game genius girl challenges the students to play the trump game with her. Shin-chan and Bo-chan play and win. / Misae and Shin-chan go to pick Hiroshi from his office. Misae manages to reach safely and pick Hiroshi after all the hurdles.
| SPECIAL–6 | "Buriburizaemon’s Adventure (Thunder)" (Japanese: ぶりぶりざえもんの冒険 (雷鳴編)) | September 26, 1994 |
| SPECIAL–6 | "Yoshinaga-sensei in love" (Japanese: 恋するよしなが先生だゾ) | September 26, 1994 |
| SPECIAL–6 | "Mom’s yoga is dangerous" (Japanese: 母ちゃんのヨガは危険だゾ) | September 26, 1994 |
Shin-chan helps a pig and receives two magic sticks in return. Shin-chan shakes the sticks and invites Buriburizaemon to help a family from the money lenders. / ?? / ?? / ?? / ?? / Hiroshi and Shin-chan ride to Ginnosuke’s house. They give a lift to a young girl who turns out to be Ginnosuke’s friend. / Ogin, a secret agent, and Shin-chan help an old man rescue his granddaughter from a criminal, Mayatsube.
| 116 | "Tasting the famous curry" (Japanese: 本格カレーを食べるゾ) | October 3, 1994 |
| 116 | "Taking Shiro for a walk!" (Japanese: シロの散歩は大変だゾ) | October 3, 1994 |
| 116 | "Competition with borrowed items" (Japanese: 借り物競争をするゾ) | October 3, 1994 |
Misae and Shin-chan tastes the curry of the famous chef, but dislike it and criticize the food and leave the restaurant. / Shiro goes around wandering alone. Shin-chan begins to train Shiro but Shiro shows no interest, as he has walked much already. / Shin-chan participates in the race with Yoshinaga, and Kawamura participates with Matsuzaka. Both teachers run the race alone.
| 117 | "Playing a tennis match" (Japanese: テニスで珍プレーだゾ) | October 10, 1994 |
| 117 | "Going for a long picnic" (Japanese: みんなで家出するゾ) | October 10, 1994 |
| 117 | "Talking to a baby" (Japanese: 赤ちゃんとお話しするゾ) | October 10, 1994 |
Hiroshi's client challenges Misae and Hiroshi to win a match for a contract. As Misae gets injured, Shin-chan plays and wins the match. / Masao's parents don't keep their promise to take him to the amusement park. Shin-chan and his friends go out together for a long picnic. As time passes, everyone returns home and leaves Masao all alone. / Okei comes over to visit while Shin-chan is home alone and shows him a tool that can be used to talk to the baby inside her tummy. Shin-chan talks to Keiko's baby and sings songs for it. Later, Keiko and Shin-chan go to a nearby store and find Misae there.
| 118 | "Playing with the fax machine" (Japanese: FAXはおもちゃだゾ) | October 17, 1994 |
| 118 | "I am a gifted painter" (Japanese: オラは天才画家だゾ) | October 17, 1994 |
| 118 | "My leg is broken" (Japanese: オラの足がこわれたゾ) | October 17, 1994 |
Hiroshi comes home with a box that contains his coworker's old fax machine. Shin-chan faxes a letter to the news channel and his drawings to Hiroshi. When Misae gets to know, she runs behind him and breaks the fax machine. / The school takes the students to a forest garden to draw sceneries. A painting artist, Picasso Kogawa copies Shin-chan and makes a beautiful painting. / Shin-chan trips and sprains his ankle while pretending to be a ballerina during Misae's naptime. Misae gives him a piggyback ride to see the doctor. As Misae takes good care of Shin-chan, he thanks his mother.
| 119 | "Being troubled by a crow" (Japanese: いたずらカラスが来たゾ) | October 24, 1994 |
| 119 | "Fighting with Kazama!" (Japanese: 風間君とケンカだゾ) | October 24, 1994 |
| 119 | "I still hate green peppers" (Japanese: ピーマン嫌いはなおらないゾ) | October 24, 1994 |
After Misae gets to know that the crow is scattering the waste, she begins chasing it. Shin-chan hunts the crow away by using dynamite. / Shin-chan starts bothering Kazama while he's trying to study for an English test. Pretty soon, they both get angry at one another and start fighting. / Shin-chan dislikes green peppers, so he goes to Masao's house. After Misae and Hiroshi bring him home, Misae makes him eat the green peas.
| 120 | "Going out for a boat ride" (Japanese: ボート遊びをするゾ) | October 31, 1994 |
| 120 | "Cleaning up is a hassle" (Japanese: おかたづけはメンドーだゾ) | October 31, 1994 |
| 120 | "Eating a jumbo ramen bowl" (Japanese: ジャンボラーメンを食べるゾ) | October 31, 1994 |
Hiroshi and Shin-chan go out by themselves while Misae is out bargain shopping on a Sunday. When Hiroshi and Shin-chan go boating, Hiroshi falls asleep and Shin-chan rows the boat to reach the land and meet his mother. / As Shin-chan feels hungry, he orders Masao to complete his work. Misae gets angry, and unknowingly, beats Masao instead of Shin-chan. / Hiroshi and his family visit a restaurant without money. So, the Noharas decide to take on the ultra super jumbo ramen challenge to eat for free at a ramen shop after borrowing their bathroom.
| 121 | "The ice-cream incident" (Japanese: アイスクリームで事件だゾ) | November 7, 1994 |
| 121 | "Farewell to Kazama-kun" (Japanese: 風間君とお別れだゾ) | November 7, 1994 |
| 121 | "I'm forgotten" (Japanese: 忘れられたオラだゾ) | November 7, 1994 |
Misae gets ready for her class reunion the next day by ironing her expensive suit, but Shin-chan accidentally spills ice cream on top of it. He finds ways to hide the stain, but messes it up even more. / For Kazama's farewell, Shin-chan sings a song and makes Kazama emotional. Next day, Kazama's plans to move to New York get cancelled. / Misae falls asleep while riding the train. After getting off at her stop in a hurry, she realizes she accidentally left Shin-chan behind on the train. After a long wait, Misae finds Shin-chan, but forgets her shopping bags in the metro.
| 122 | "Napping can be rough" (Japanese: お昼寝するのもたいへんだゾ) | November 14, 1994 |
| 122 | "Lunch at a restaurant" (Japanese: ゴーカにしゃぶしゃぶだゾ) | November 14, 1994 |
| 122 | "Getting a haircut with dad!" (Japanese: 父ちゃんと散髪だゾ) | November 14, 1994 |
The house is oddly quiet. Misae finds Shin-chan taking a rare nap and decides to join him, but she keeps getting interrupted and can't fall asleep. / Nene and her mom visit a shabu-shabu restaurant after skipping breakfast to prepare for the feast. Shin-chan slips in to join them. Shin-chan finishes the meal and leaves nothing for Nene's mother. / Hiroshi takes Shin-chan to the salon for a haircut. When Hiroshi sits for a shave, he gets injured due to Shin-chan's mistake.
| 123 | "Playing hide and seek" (Japanese: かくれんぼで遊ぶゾ) | November 21, 1994 |
| 123 | "Learning to bathe a baby" (Japanese: 赤ん坊しんちゃんだゾ) | November 21, 1994 |
| 123 | "Mom's part-time job" (Japanese: 母ちゃんのアルバイトだゾ) | November 21, 1994 |
Shin-chan pesters Hiroshi into playing hide-and-seek at home on a rainy day. Hiroshi is "it" and looks for Shin-chan, but he is nowhere to be found. /Shin-chan bumps into Okei on the street. Okei is headed to the health center to learn how to bathe a baby, but Shin-chan decides to tag along. Shin-chan draws on all the toy babies, so the instructors use Shin-chan to give a demo to the ladies. / Misae starts working part-time at the bookstore in order to buy a coat without her husband knowing, but Hiroshi shows up at the store as a customer. But she loses her job due to Shin-chan's mischief.
| 124 | "Miss Matsuzaka's holiday" (Japanese: 松坂先生の休日だゾ) | November 28, 1994 |
| 124 | "I'm a child in Nene-chan's family" (Japanese: ネネちゃんちの子になるゾ) | November 28, 1994 |
| 124 | "Unable to enter the house" (Japanese: おうちに入れないゾ) | November 28, 1994 |
Ms. Matsuzaka spots Shin-chan at the department store when she goes there to blow off steam and to take advantage of their various offerings. / Nene comes over to play with Shin-chan while her mother is out shopping, but neither of them are interested in the things the other wants to do. They decide to switch places in the family. However things get chaotic when Moeko returns and Shin-chan treats her as his mom, much to her ire. / Misae rushes home after shopping to be there before Shin-chan's bus arrives, but she notices she doesn't have her keys and can't get inside the house. Shin-chan and Misae spend an entire day outside. In the night, when Hiroshi returns, they feel relieved.
| 125 | "Returning a handkerchief" (Japanese: 女の人を追いかけるゾ) | December 5, 1994 |
| 125 | "Mom's drunk" (Japanese: 酔っぱらい母ちゃんだゾ) | December 5, 1994 |
| 125 | "I love Nijikai" (Japanese: 二次会は大好きだゾ) | December 5, 1994 |
Shin-chan and his friends play the detective game. While playing, they notice a handkerchief fallen from a lady's hand, so they follow her to return the handkerchief. Suddenly, Bo-chan remembers the lady speaking about going to a bank. So, they all go to the bank and find the lady. On seeing the children chase her, the lady panics and runs to escape from there. / Hiroshi has to work on his wedding anniversary even though he had promised to go celebrate with his family, so Misae goes out to eat with Shin-chan. / ???
| 126 | "Darkness is fun" (Japanese: 真っ暗けは楽しいゾ) | December 12, 1994 |
| 126 | "An apprentice teacher" (Japanese: 見習い先生が来たゾ) | December 12, 1994 |
| 126 | "Poor sparrow" (Japanese: かわいそうなスズメだゾ) | December 12, 1994 |
As the lights go off due to a power cut, the family sits together and have a candle light dinner. / A substitute teacher, Yumeo Takai spends time with the children and handles the kids with determination, while Matsuzaka and Yoshinaga argue over silly things. / After Hiroshi treats an injured sparrow, Shin-chan gets happy to see the sparrow fly again, but gets upset as the sparrow loses its life.
| 127 | "An early New Year's card" (Japanese: 早めのお年賀状だゾ) | December 19, 1994 |
| 127 | "The home delivery business is tough" (Japanese: 宅配便さんはご苦労だゾ) | December 19, 1994 |
| 127 | "Miss Yoshinaga's Eve" (Japanese: よしなが先生のイブだゾ) | December 19, 1994 |
Shin-chan stamps the seal on all the New Year greeting cards. He posts Misae's greeting cards, but in the wrong post box. / As Shin-chan and Shiro feel hungry, they open a neighbour's parcel and eat it. After knowing about it, Misae spanks Shin-chan. / Shin-chan and his friends celebrate Christmas party at Yoshinaga's place. Yoshinaga enjoys herself with the kids and doesn't let them go home.
| SPECIAL–7 | "A baby is born" (Japanese: 赤ちゃんが生まれるゾ) | December 26, 1994 |
| SPECIAL–7 | "The last battle of Quantum" (Japanese: カンタム最後の戦いだゾ) | December 26, 1994 |
| SPECIAL–7 | "A big cleaning at the end of the year" (Japanese: 年末の大そうじだゾ) | December 26, 1994 |
| SPECIAL–7 | "Match selling me" (Japanese: マッチ売リのオラだゾ) | December 26, 1994 |
| SPECIAL–7 | "Get excited at the year-end party" (Japanese: 忘年会で盛りあがるゾ) | December 26, 1994 |
While visiting Misae, Keiko experiences labour pain and Misae and Shin-chan rush her to the hospital where she gives birth to a baby boy. / In Kuntam Robo’s TV show, Kuntam Robo and his friend merge their powers and tear the midnight gang into pieces. Kuntam Robo and his wife combine their skills and fight Goragora robot, the president of the midnight gang. / ??

== 1995 ==
| No. | Title | Original release date |
|---|---|---|
| Rebroadcasting–Special | "None" | January 2, 1995 |
rebroadcasting
| 128 | "New Year’s Day is Busy" (Japanese: お正月はにぎやかだゾ) | January 9, 1995 |
| 128 | "Going skiing" (Japanese: スキーにでかけるゾ) | January 9, 1995 |
| 128 | "The ski slope is a fuss" (Japanese: ゲレンデは大騒ぎだゾ) | January 9, 1995 |
Shin-chan's grandparents join Shin-chan and his parents for the New Year celebration. The family eats lunch and spend their day together. / Shin-chan has a hard time getting up for the family ski trip. Hiroshi wakes him up by telling him about all the beautiful ladies that will be there. After Hiroshi and his family reach the skiing location, Hiroshi and Misae get to know that Shin-chan has left the skiing material at home. / When Hiroshi, Misae and Shin-chan go skiing, Shin-chan loses his track. They later find him with a group of men.
| 129 | "Time for Fire Safety" (Japanese: 火の用心するゾ) | January 16, 1995 |
| 129 | "Masao! Our hero" (Japanese: マサオ君はモテモテだゾ) | January 16, 1995 |
| 129 | "Hiroshi remains hungry" (Japanese: おモチはおいしいゾ) | January 16, 1995 |
As Shin-chan notices the fire during his patrolling duty and calls the fire brigade, his and Misae's picture get printed on the newspaper. / Shin-chan and his friends call Masao a hero for getting his appendix operated. Next day, Masao feels bad on not getting any importance. / Shin-chan and Misae prepare rice cakes and fill their stomach. When Hiroshi returns home, he finds no food for himself.
| 130 | "Auntie Masae comes to town!" (Japanese: まさえおばさんが来たゾ) | January 23, 1995 |
| 130 | "Suffering from cold" (Japanese: 子供はカゼの子だゾ) | January 23, 1995 |
| 130 | "I caught a cold!" (Japanese: やっぱりカゼをひいたゾ) | January 23, 1995 |
Masae scares Misae with a mask. Later, Masae tries to scare Shin-chan but gets a start after Shin-chan scares her with a mask. / The kindergarten principal talks about staying healthy during cold season. While the kids huddle together, he shows them how to warm up with a towel. / Misae goes to buy some medicines for Shin-chan's cold and cough. After returning, she feels sick and Shin-chan gets well.
| 131 | "Dating (My dating)" (Japanese: おデートするゾ) | January 30, 1995 |
| 131 | "Women's wrestling fans!" (Japanese: 女子プロレスのファンだゾ) | January 30, 1995 |
| 131 | "Shifting the snow is fun" (Japanese: 雪かきは楽しいゾ) | January 30, 1995 |
?? / ?? / After hearing about the heavy snowfall forecast, Hiroshi decides to stay at home. Next morning, on seeing Hiroshi shifting the snow gathered in front of the house, Shin-chan uses the vessels from the house to shift the snow. Later, Shin-chan makes a heap of snow and slides down through it. Hiroshi too enjoys the slide and later realises that his car has been frozen under the heap of snow.
| 132 | "This baby is cute" (Japanese: 赤ちゃんは可愛いゾ) | February 6, 1995 |
| 132 | "Kazama bunks a lecture" (Japanese: 風間くんの息抜きだゾ) | February 6, 1995 |
| 132 | "Driving is dangerous!" (Japanese: 車の運転は危険だゾ) | February 6, 1995 |
Shin-chan and his mother visit Keiko and her new born baby, Hitoshi. Shin-chan is excited to see such a small child and plays with him. / Kazama bunks his English lecture and goes to Shin-chan's place. Misae gets to know about Kazama and takes him back to his mother. Kazama and his mother get emotional and cry. / ???
| 133 | "Drawing on a wall" (Japanese: 落書きしちゃったゾ) | February 13, 1995 |
| 133 | "Lucky draw" (Japanese: 福ぶくろを買うゾ) | February 13, 1995 |
| 133 | "Chiroku clears her exam" (Japanese: 受験生に気をつかうゾ) | February 13, 1995 |
Shin-chan draws on a wall and gets caught by a security lady, Higashi. She tries to get hold of him but he escapes. / Misae gets a pamphlet of a lucky draw and goes to the store with Shin-chan. She enters the store and wins a Kuntam Robo. / Chiroku comes to Shin-chan's house to study. Later, Misae gets a letter from Chiroku stating that she passed because Shin-chan kept her mind relaxed.
| 134 | "Playing with Tissues" (Japanese: ティッシュで遊ぶゾ) | February 20, 1995 |
| 134 | "Time for a nap" (Japanese: 幼稚園でお昼寝だゾ) | February 20, 1995 |
| 134 | "Watching the beautiful stars" (Japanese: 冬の星座を見るゾ) | February 20, 1995 |
Misae gets 5 boxes of tissues from the market. Shin-chan dumps the waste tissues in the dustbin along with the fresh ones. / Yoshinaga tells the children to sleep. Shin-chan and Kazama stay awake, and when the school bus arrives, all the children fall asleep. / Shin-chan and his family go to Mount Kashigabu to watch the stars. On seeing a shooting star, Shin-chan wishes to be a pirate man.
| 135 | "Learning calligraphy" (Japanese: お習字をするゾ) | February 27, 1995 |
| 135 | "Visit to a TV station" (Japanese: テレビ局の見学だゾ) | February 27, 1995 |
| 135 | "Fixing the TV problem" (Japanese: テレビがこわれたゾ) | February 27, 1995 |
The principal teaches the students how to write their name in calligraphy, but Shin-chan troubles everyone. / Misae takes Shin-chan to a TV station to watch a live telecast of an exercise program. Shin-chan troubles the instructor and creates a hassle for her. / When Shin-chan watches Action Mask, the TV goes off. So, Hiroshi climbs on the roof and fixes the issue.
| 136 | "Learning how to eat" (Japanese: 食事のマナーは厳しいゾ) | March 6, 1995 |
| 136 | "Visiting a neighbour" (Japanese: 回らん板をまわすゾ) | March 6, 1995 |
| 136 | "Reading at a library" (Japanese: 親子で立ち読みだゾ) | March 6, 1995 |
Shin-chan eats the cream from the bun that was kept for a guest, Narita. So, Misae teaches Shin-chan how to eat his food. / Misae sends Shin-chan to deliver a circular to a neighbour. Shin-chan forgets about it and gets into a conversation with the neighbour. / The librarian uses her techniques to get rid of people, but it fails on Shin-chan and Misae, as they get engrossed in the books.
| 137 | "Shin-chan and Shiro take a bath" (Japanese: シロとお風呂だゾ) | March 13, 1995 |
| 137 | "A lesson in love!" (Japanese: 恋の応援をするゾ) | March 13, 1995 |
| 137 | "A lesson in love! 2" (Japanese: 恋の道はきびしいゾ) | March 13, 1995 |
While taking a bath, Shin-chan plays with the shampoo and the soap and finishes all of Misae's expensive body washes. / A boy waits for Ryuko outside high school to propose to her but gets nervous. Shin-chan, Nene-chan and Bo-chan encourage him. / The boy speaks out his feelings to Riyoko but she refuses his proposal. Later, the boy falls in love with another girl.
| 138 | "Cute Shiro snake (It's cute shirohebi!)" (Japanese: かわいい白へびだゾ) | March 20, 1995 |
| 138 | "Stay at a hotel" (Japanese: 一流ホテルの夜だゾ) | March 20, 1995 |
| 138 | "Visit to Action Land" (Japanese: アクションランドで遊ぶゾ) | March 20, 1995 |
??? / When Shin-chan and his family go to a hotel, the door gets locked and Misae remains out of the room in a towel. She tries to escape from people's eyes, but gets caught. / Hiroshi takes the tickets of a roller coaster and stands in the line, while Misae and Shin-chan watch the parade. Later, when Hiroshi's turn arrives, he fails to get entry as Misae keeps the ticket with her.
| 139 | "Ah, spring is here...!" (Japanese: 春の朝はのどかだゾ) | March 27, 1995 |
| 139 | "Shiro is unwell" (Japanese: シロがお病気だゾ) | March 27, 1995 |
| 139 | "Fun with cherry blossoms!" (Japanese: お花見で盛りあがるゾ) | March 27, 1995 |
After Hiroshi leaves, Misae and Shin-chan spend their day at home. Shin-chan catches her dress and tears it when a neighbour visits them. / As Shiro falls ill, the doctor keeps him under observation for few days. Later, Shiro returns home fit and fine. / Shin-chan and his friends meet Nene-chan and her parents at a picnic. Nene-chan's mother gets angry as Misae joins them.
| 140 | "A promise" (Japanese: チリ紙交換するゾ) | April 3, 1995 |
| 140 | "TV stops working" (Japanese: テレビをこわしたゾ) | April 3, 1995 |
| 140 | "Shiro's favourite toy" (Japanese: シロとぬいぐるみだゾ) | April 3, 1995 |
Misae gives away Shin-chan's books in exchange for tissue papers, but Shin-chan brings it back and promises to take care of it. / As the TV stops working, Shin-chan gets upset, so Misae prepares some delicious dessert for him. / When Shiro goes out alone for a stroll, he finds a stuffed toy and brings it home. The next day, he sees a girl searching for her toy, and returns it.
| SPECIAL–8 | "Primitive era Shin-chan" (Japanese: 原始時代のしんちゃんだゾ) | April 10, 1995 |
| SPECIAL–8 | "A fight with natto" (Japanese: ナットウでケンカだゾ) | April 10, 1995 |
| SPECIAL–8 | "Bo-chan’s proposal" (Japanese: ボーちゃんのプロポーズだゾ) | April 10, 1995 |
| SPECIAL–8 | "A drunken Shiro" (Japanese: 酔っぱらいシロだゾ) | April 10, 1995 |
| 141 | "I wanna go for a drive!" (Japanese: ドライブに行きたいゾ) | April 17, 1995 |
| 141 | "Shin-chan's own room" (Japanese: オラの部屋が欲しいゾ) | April 17, 1995 |
| 141 | "Could it be... love??" (Japanese: 恋の予感がするゾ) | April 17, 1995 |
Due to a golf match with the clients, Hiroshi cancels the plan of going on a drive. Later, he gives him an excuse and goes on a drive with his family. / Shin-chan acts stubborn and makes his mother clean a room for him but he creates a mess in the room. / Kawaguchi goes to Shin-chan's school to give him his lunch box. There Kawaguchi meets Matsuzaka and spends some time with her.
| 142 | "Misae meets with an accident" (Japanese: 名運転手みさえだゾ) | April 24, 1995 |
| 142 | "Misae calls the cops" (Japanese: 母ちゃんの交通事故だゾ) | April 24, 1995 |
| 142 | "Matsuzaka and Kawaguchi express their feelings" (Japanese: まつざか先生の春だゾ) | April 24, 1995 |
Misae takes Shin-chan to the store in her car. She gets distracted and bumps into traffic police's statue. / Misae calls up the cops to inform them about the accident and decides to reimburse extra money from the insurance company. / Matsuzaka and Kawaguchi meet on a baseball ground and express their feelings for one another with the help of Shin-chan.
| 143 | "Movie time" (Japanese: アイドルと握手だゾ) | May 1, 1995 |
| 143 | "Kasukabe Defence Force" (Japanese: かすかべ防衛隊だゾ) | May 1, 1995 |
| 143 | "Kawaguchi and Matsuzaka-sensei's date" (Japanese: デートの見物だゾ) | May 1, 1995 |
Shin-chan and his family go to watch a movie of Kizakora. Shin-chan wins a chance of meeting her personally. / Shin-chan and his friends create the base of Kasukabe Defence Force at Yoshinaga's residence. They go out in search of goons but get diverted. / Misae and Shin-chan follow Kawaguchi and Matsuzaka on their date. Matsuzaka gets to know that Kawaguchi is not interested in her.
| 144 | "Watching Sumo wrestling live" (Japanese: 大相撲を見に行くゾ) | May 8, 1995 |
| 144 | "Yoshinaga is a drunk teacher" (Japanese: よしなが先生は酒乱だゾ) | May 8, 1995 |
| 144 | "Working overtime with Dad (Dad and the overtime!)" (Japanese: 父ちゃんと残業だゾ) | May 8, 1995 |
Shin-chan and his parents go to watch sumo wrestling live. Misae cheers for Mainoumi, while Shin-chan cheers for Onishiki. Eventually, Mynomimi wins, but Shin-chan objects the decision and goes inside the ring. When Misae goes to get Shin-chan, Yokozuna lifts her up on his shoulder, and Shin-chan also climbs. Hiroshi clicks pictures of them. At the end, they get kicked out of the stadium. / When Yoshinaga visits Shin-chan's house to talk to his parents, Shin-chan gives some juice to accompany her. However, the juice that Yoshinaga drank contained alcohol, causing her to become drunk and cause chaos in the house./ Shin-chan accidentally wakes up in the middle of the night while Hiroshi is working overtime. After his work is done, they both watch some TV that shows some adult content. Shin-chan starts making horny noises upon seeing the content, which wakes up Misae and she beats him and Hiroshi up.
| 145 | "Hiroshi's business trip" (Japanese: 父ちゃんが出張だゾ) | May 15, 1995 |
| 145 | "Shin-chan will miss his father" (Japanese: 父ちゃんが出ていくゾ) | May 15, 1995 |
| 145 | "Bidding goodbye to Hiroshi" (Japanese: 父ちゃんとお別れだゾ) | May 15, 1995 |
Hiroshi tells Shin-chan and Misae that he will be out for a month due to a business trip. Misae gets shocked, but later agrees and wishes Hiroshi good luck. / Shin-chan feels sad and realizes that he will miss his father, so he and Misae go to pick Hiroshi from his office. / Shin-chan acts stubborn, but Hiroshi makes him understand. Next day, Shin-chan and Misae go to reach Hiroshi to the station.
| 146 | "A night without daddy" (Japanese: 父ちゃんがいない夜だゾ) | May 22, 1995 |
| 146 | "Playing baseball is a problem" (Japanese: 野球するのも大変だゾ) | May 22, 1995 |
| 146 | "Doing some cleaning" (Japanese: プッツンしちゃうゾ) | May 22, 1995 |
While Hiroshi gets worried about Misae and Shin-chan, Misae, Keiko, Satoshi and Shin-chan enjoy a great time together. / When Shin-chan goes to take the bat back from a neighbour's house, a pet dog tries to harm Shin-chan, but he manages to escape. / Shin-chan goes home and decides to clean the house in order to get a gift from Misae, but messes the house even more.
| 147 | "Shin-chan drinks coffee" (Japanese: おとなの味を飲むゾ) | June 5, 1995 |
| 147 | "Shin-chan visits Nene-chan" (Japanese: ネネちゃんをお見舞だゾ) | June 5, 1995 |
| 147 | "Grandfather's visit" (Japanese: 助っ人じいちゃんだゾ) | June 5, 1995 |
Shin-chan makes coffee for himself and drinks it. In the night, he finds it difficult to sleep, and stays awake. / Nene-chan's mother opens the sweet potato jelly beans puri to eat, but Shin-chan takes a big piece of it. Nene-chan's mother feels bad. / Shin-chan's grandfather, Ginnosuke visits Shin-chan and Misae, to help them in Hiroshi's absence. Instead of repairing, he messes up things.
| 148 | "Boarding the bullet train" (Japanese: 組長先生はこわいゾ) | June 12, 1995 |
| 148 | "Dad’s misfortune (Misadventures of father?)" (Japanese: 父ちゃんの災難だゾ) | June 12, 1995 |
| 148 | "A day in Osaka" (Japanese: 大阪で食いだおれるゾ) | June 12, 1995 |
Misae and Shin-chan board the bullet train to reach Osaka. On their journey, they meet the principal of the school, who teaches a passenger a lesson. / ?? / Hiroshi takes Misae and Shin-chan to a restaurant, where they meet the principal sitting with his other friends. As one of the customers misbehave with Shin-chan and his family, the principal and his friends give him a scary stare.
| 149 | "Heavy shopping" (Japanese: たくさん買い物をするゾ) | June 19, 1995 |
| 149 | "Saving a sparrow" (Japanese: バードウォッチングだゾ) | June 19, 1995 |
| 149 | "A video for Hiroshi" (Japanese: ビデオレター出すゾ) | June 19, 1995 |
Misae and Shin-chan go shopping. While returning, Shin-chan gifts the owner of a small shop they visited before, a packet of chips. / On a bird sanctuary trip, Shin-chan and his friends save a baby sparrow and place it in its nest. / Misae misses Hiroshi, so she films Shin-chan, Shiro and herself, to show Hiroshi. On seeing the video, Hiroshi gets emotional.
| 150 | "Hiroshi's return" (Japanese: 父ちゃんが帰ってくるゾ) | June 26, 1995 |
| 150 | "Shin-chan blackmails Ryuko" (Japanese: 紅さそり隊の師匠だゾ) | June 26, 1995 |
| 150 | "Shin-chan cooks food" (Japanese: タコ焼きを作るゾ) | June 26, 1995 |
Misae and Shin-chan go to the station to pick Hiroshi, but miss out on him. They get angry on one another but feel happy on seeing each other. / Shin-chan blackmails Ryuko and makes her treat him like a king after knowing about her different side. / After Hiroshi orders a cookware to prepare a dish, Shin-chan learns how to make the dish and prepares it for everyone.
| 151 | "Shin-chan plays with Hitoshi" (Japanese: 赤ちゃんと遊ぶゾ) | July 3, 1995 |
| 151 | "Fishing competition" (Japanese: つり堀は大さわぎだゾ) | July 3, 1995 |
| 151 | "Misae and the mouse" (Japanese: ヤネウラの散歩だゾ) | July 3, 1995 |
Shin-chan goes to visit Hitoshi. They play together and draw on each other's faces with permanent colours. / Hiroshi, Misae and Shin-chan take part in a fishing competition, and instead of fishing, Shin-chan pulls out the wig of the man sitting beside him. / After Misae locks Shin-chan in the wardrobe as punishment for not feeding Shiro, Shin-chan climbs on the roof and chases a mouse, and scares Misae with a toy mouse.
| 152 | "Heavy rains forecasted" (Japanese: 雨ふりザーザーだゾ) | July 10, 1995 |
| 152 | "Watching TV at midnight" (Japanese: 真夜中の楽しみだゾ) | July 10, 1995 |
| 152 | "The Tanabata festival" (Japanese: 愛の七夕祭りだゾ) | July 10, 1995 |
As Misae goes out, Shin-chan uses the umbrellas to protect the clothes from getting wet in the rain. / Shin-chan wakes up at 12am to watch his favourite TV program, but gets saved from his mother due to a fire in the kitchen. / Matsuzaka and Yoshinaga try to please the principal, but the principal selects Koisumi madam as the eye goddess for the Tanabata festival.
| 153 | "The road of Nampa is strict" (Japanese: ナンパの道はきびしいゾ) | July 17, 1995 |
| 153 | "Food poisoning is hard" (Japanese: 食あたりはつらいゾ) | July 17, 1995 |
| 153 | "Staying at the hospital" (Japanese: 病院にお泊まりだゾ) | July 17, 1995 |
Misae and Hiroshi eat fish eggs that were kept in the fridge. At first, they enjoy the taste but later, they feel sick and experience vomiting and diarrhoea. So, they call up the ambulance. / Shin-chan follows Misae and Hiroshi in the ambulance and reaches the hospital. At night, he gets scared, but feels happy after meeting his parents. Next morning, the nurse gifts Misae and Hiroshi fish eggs.
| 154 | "Grandfather leaving house" (Japanese: じいちゃんの家出だゾ) | August 7, 1995 |
| 154 | "Let's go to girls college" (Japanese: 女子大は楽しいゾ) | August 7, 1995 |
| 154 | "Grandpa is making a noise (Poppy-chan is alarmist?)" (Japanese: じいちゃんは人騒がせだゾ) | August 7, 1995 |
As Ginnosuke gets into an argument with his wife, he leaves his house and comes to Hiroshi's place. Misae and Shin-chan console him and ask him to stay as long as he wishes to. / Ginnosuke and Shin-chan decide to visit a bird sanctuary. They leave the house to go to the sanctuary but take the wrong bus and reach the girls university. / ??
| 155 | "Playing with Kazama-kun!" (Japanese: 風間くんとお遊びだゾ) | August 14, 1995 |
| 155 | "Playing in the pool!" (Japanese: プールで遊ぶゾ) | August 14, 1995 |
| 155 | "Still playing in the pool!" (Japanese: まだまだプールで遊ぶゾ) | August 14, 1995 |
As Nene-chan and Masao are busy, Kazama and Shin-chan decide to play together. Kazama comes up with an idea of playing wrestling. They create a pitch to play by drawing a circle and two lines. While wrestling, Shin-chan blows air in Kazama's ears and gets a foul. They end their game at 5.30 pm, as Kazama needed to rush for his tuitions. / ?? / ??
| 156 | "Choosing this year’s swimsuit" (Japanese: 今年の水着を選ぶゾ) | August 21, 1995 |
| 156 | "Taken care of by the guest house" (Japanese: 民宿にお世話になるゾ) | August 21, 1995 |
| 156 | "Matsuzaka-sensei’s crisis" (Japanese: まつざか先生の危機だゾ) | August 21, 1995 |
The school organizes a visit to the summer school for 3 days. After the students reach the island, the principal takes the boys for a swim. While swimming in the water, the principal comes up with a competition of staying in the water for a longer time. Most of the children give up and leave, but Shin-chan and the principal stay back and later, fall sick.
| 157 | "Misae suffers from constipation" (Japanese: トイレに閉じこめられたゾ) | August 28, 1995 |
| 157 | "Miss Matsuzaka is tensed" (Japanese: まつざか先生のリヤカーだゾ) | August 28, 1995 |
| 157 | "Fireworks in the sky" (Japanese: 花火大会に行くゾ) | August 28, 1995 |
Misae goes to the washroom and gets locked. She sends Shin-chan to seek help but Shin-chan forgets about her. / Matsuzaka takes a loan by keeping her unwanted things with the broker to buy a necklace but still falls short of money. / Hiroshi and his family go to see the fireworks in the sky. They sit in a private boat and enjoy the view of the fireworks.
| 158 | "I'm a baby-sitter!" (Japanese: オラはベビーシッターだゾ) | September 4, 1995 |
| 158 | "I chase Dad!" (Japanese: 父ちゃんを追跡だゾ) | September 4, 1995 |
| 158 | "I fulfill my delivery mission!" (Japanese: 配達の使命をはたすゾ) | September 4, 1995 |
When Shin-chan and Fumie take care of Hitoshi, Shin-chan eats the baby food. So, Fumie spends her pocket money to buy more food. / Hiroshi completes his office project on time but takes the wrong papers along. So Misae sends Shin-chan to deliver the papers to Hiroshi. / Shin-chan gets lost while searching for Hiroshi. But reaches just in time and delivers the right project papers to him.
| 159 | "Dreaming Dad!" (Japanese: 夢見る父ちゃんだゾ) | September 11, 1995 |
| 159 | "Nene-chan gets mad!" (Japanese: ネネちゃんがおこったゾ) | September 11, 1995 |
| 159 | "Proposal anniversary!" (Japanese: プロポーズ記念日だゾ) | September 11, 1995 |
Hiroshi falls asleep and gets a dream. He speaks out few names in his sleep that triggers questions in Misae’s mind. / As Shin-chan hurts Nene-chan's toy, Nene-chan gets angry on him but forgives him later. The next day, she gets angry on the same toy. / As Hiroshi forgets their proposal anniversary day, Misae beats him and takes him shopping to make him compensate for his mistake.
| 160 | "My treasure pants!" (Japanese: 宝物のおパンツだゾ) | September 18, 1995 |
| 160 | "My pants fly!" (Japanese: おパンツが飛んだゾ) | September 18, 1995 |
| 160 | "Showing off my pants!" (Japanese: おパンツの自まんだゾ) | September 18, 1995 |
Misae returns home and brings Action Mask jet pant for Shin-chan. Shin-chan gets excited and clicks photographs of it. / As the wind blows, Shin-chan’s Action Mask jet pants fly in the air. Shin-chan goes in search of it and finds it in a boy's house. / Shin-chan spreads the news about his Action Mask jet pants in school. He watches Action Mask and decides to change his clothes every day.
| SPECIAL–9 | "Playing a taxi" (Japanese: タクシーごっこするゾ) | September 25, 1995 |
| SPECIAL–9 | "Onishi drama Nohara bouncer" (Japanese: 大西部劇 野原の用心棒) | September 25, 1995 |
| SPECIAL–9 | "Playing on the roof of a department store" (Japanese: デパートの屋上で遊ぶゾ) | September 25, 1995 |
| SPECIAL–9 | "I’m the cameraman of the group leader" (Japanese: 組長先生のカメラマンだゾ) | September 25, 1995 |
| SPECIAL–9 | "Action Mask is Very Strong" (Japanese: アクション仮面パワーアップだゾ) | September 25, 1995 |
| SPECIAL–9 | "A mother who has fallen sheep" (Japanese: 寝ちがえた母ちゃんだゾ) | September 25, 1995 |
| SPECIAL–9 | "Onishi drama sequel, Nohara bouncer" (Japanese: 大西部劇 続・野原の用心棒) | September 25, 1995 |
?? / ?? / ?? / Action Mask fights Eagle Head and his army as they fidget with the time. After being defeated by Eagle Head, Action Mask emerges as a stronger person. / ??
| 161 | "I have a lively time at the athletic meet!" (Japanese: 運動会で活やくだゾ) | October 9, 1995 |
| 161 | "I'm exhausted after staying out overnight!" (Japanese: 朝帰りでボロボロだゾ) | October 9, 1995 |
| 161 | "Mom tries to play golf!" (Japanese: 母ちゃんのゴルフ体験だゾ) | October 9, 1995 |
The rose group and sunflower group have a competition during a sports event. Shin-chan uses a strategy and wins the game. / Hiroshi returns home in the morning. He plays the unconscious game with Shin-chan and goes to sleep. / Misae takes Shin-chan along and goes to a golf academy to take free golf training. Due to Shin-chan's mischief, the instructor regrets training for free.
| 162 | "It is I, captain Shin-chan!" (Japanese: キャプテンしんちゃんだゾ) | October 16, 1995 |
| 162 | "Dad's reunion!" (Japanese: 父ちゃんの同窓会だゾ) | October 16, 1995 |
| 162 | "The reunion is fun!" (Japanese: 同窓会は楽しいゾ) | October 16, 1995 |
Captain Shin-chan along with Misae, Shiro and the principal succeed in their mission to save the universe against the universe pirate, Hiroshi. / Hiroshi and his family travel to Akita. They meet Hiroshi’s school friend, Yoshio, who takes Hiroshi and his family to Hiroshi’s school. / Hiroshi meets his friends at a school reunion. As a girl named Masako flirts with Hiroshi, Misae beats Hiroshi.
| 163 | "Penguin repays a kindness!" (Japanese: ペンギンの恩返しだゾ) | October 23, 1995 |
| 163 | "The fried noodles blow up!" (Japanese: 焼きそばが爆発だゾ) | October 23, 1995 |
| 163 | "What a rainy day!" (Japanese: 雨の日のおむかえだゾ) | October 23, 1995 |
The narrator tells a story about Kazama, who helps a crane and a penguin, Shin-chan. Instead of repaying Kazama’s favor, Shin-chan adds on to his problems. / Shin-chan opens a noodle packet. But he gets confused between the noodle powder and the gunpowder and remains hungry. / Misae leaves Shin-chan home and goes shopping. As it starts raining, Shin-chan goes to the mall with an umbrella for her.
| 164 | "Dad's rear end hurts!" (Japanese: 父ちゃんのお尻がビョーキだゾ) | October 30, 1995 |
| 164 | "A ninja of justice" (Japanese: オラは正義の忍者だゾ) | October 30, 1995 |
| 164 | "Dad goes to the hospital" (Japanese: 父ちゃんの入院だゾ) | October 30, 1995 |
| 165 | "Dad’s surgery" (Japanese: 父ちゃんの手術だゾ) | November 6, 1995 |
| 165 | "Dad’s hospitalized life" (Japanese: 父ちゃんの入院生活だゾ) | November 6, 1995 |
| 165 | "Buying Expensive Steaks" (Japanese: 高級ステーキ肉を買うゾ) | November 6, 1995 |
?? / ?? / When Misae and Shin-chan go shopping, Nene-chan reaches there with her mother for shopping. Nene-chan and Shin-chan wish to eat steaks for dinner. But as Misae and Moeko have less money in their wallets, they choose to not buy the steaks. As a matter of pride, Misae and Moeko add the steaks into their shopping baskets. But when they get a chance, they keep it back on the shelf.
| 166 | "Three thieves and me!" (Japanese: オラと3人の盗賊だゾ) | November 13, 1995 |
| 166 | "The Action Mask Man Spider Robot of Fear!" (Japanese: アクション仮面 恐怖の蜘蛛ロボット) | November 13, 1995 |
| 166 | "I refurbish Shiro's house!" (Japanese: シロの家を改築だゾ) | November 13, 1995 |
The narrator tells a story about Shin-chan and the 3 thieves. Shin-chan finds a magical box with gold but loses it in a fight with the three thieves. / In the Action Mask program, the Eagle head sends spider robots to take revenge from Action Mask. But the Eagle head loses. / Shin-chan decides to reconstruct Shiro's house. But instead of making it look better, Shin-chan makes Shiro homeless.
| 167 | "Cleaning up dead leaves!" (Japanese: 枯れ葉のソージだゾ) | November 20, 1995 |
| 167 | "I prepare for winter!" (Japanese: 冬じたくをするゾ) | November 20, 1995 |
| 167 | "The story of the beloved Shiro!" (Japanese: シロの愛情物語だゾ) | November 20, 1995 |
Misae makes Shin-chan gather the dried leaves from the garden. Then, she burns it and roasts sweet potatoes. / Hiroshi checks the store room and finds his previous year birthday gifts. Shin-chan learns about it and makes Hiroshi open the gifts. / Shin-chan meets a girl, who feeds Shiro food every day. The next day, Shin-chan and Shiro wish good luck to the girl before she leaves for America.
| 168 | "I play tag with Bo-chan!" (Japanese: ボーちゃんと鬼ごっこだゾ) | November 27, 1995 |
| 168 | "I follow a date!" (Japanese: デートについてくゾ) | November 27, 1995 |
| 168 | "I jazz up the date!" (Japanese: デートをもりあげるゾ) | November 27, 1995 |
Misae plays the big devil game with Shin-chan and Bo-chan. Later, the family goes out for dinner and leave Bo-chan in the house itself. / Yoshinaga leaves the house to go on a date with Ishizaka, but Shin-chan follows her and goes along with her. / Yoshinaga and Shin-chan spend a day with Ishizaka. At the end, Yoshinaga thanks Shin-chan for a wonderful day.
| 169 | "Angry Red Scorpion Group!" (Japanese: 怒りの紅さそり隊だゾ) | December 4, 1995 |
| 169 | "No reading in the bookstore" (Japanese: 立ち読みは許さないゾ) | December 4, 1995 |
| 169 | "Secret savings!" (Japanese: ヘソクリは秘密だゾ) | December 4, 1995 |
The principal gives the Saitama Crimson Scorpions a job of gathering dried leaves and pays them. / The librarian appoints Shin-chan as the bookseller. Shin-chan stops Misae from reading a book. But as he would have to risk a hamburger for that, he sells it for free. / Shin-chan sees Misae hide her monthly savings, and blackmails her with the word savings. Misae scolds him for that.
| 170 | "A fever attacks the whole family!" (Japanese: 一家そろって発熱だゾ) | December 11, 1995 |
| 170 | "The defence force plays hero!" (Japanese: 防衛隊の活やくだゾ) | December 11, 1995 |
| 170 | "A bath on cold night" (Japanese: 寒い夜はお風呂だゾ) | December 11, 1995 |
Shin-chan, Misae, and Hiroshi suffer from fever due to bad weather. However, the family makes the necessary arrangements. The next morning, their body temperatures return to normal. / The Kasukabe Defence Force prepares an agenda for the day and set themselves out to bring peace in the city. Shin-chan saves a boy from two other boys and teaches them a lesson. / ??
| 171 | "Miss Matsuzaka is asked out!" (Japanese: 誘われたまつざか先生だゾ) | December 18, 1995 |
| 171 | "The Action Mask Man Big Wave Plan!" (Japanese: アクション仮面 ビッグウェーブ作戦) | December 18, 1995 |
| 171 | "Year-end party can be used" (Japanese: 忘年会はつかれるゾ) | December 18, 1995 |
The owner of the elegance kindergarten offers Matsuzaka a teacher's job in his kindergarten. The principal gets worried but feels relieved when Matsuzaka refuses to resign from her job. / The Eagle Head makes a plan to attack the world using a gigantic wave inducer. But Action Mask arrives at the right time and saves the world. The program teaches Shin-chan to be careful with water. / ??
| SPECIAL–10 | "The Adventures of Buriburizaemon: The Soaring Chapter" (Japanese: ぶりぶりざえもんの冒険（飛翔編）) | December 25, 1995 |
| SPECIAL–10 | "The Adventures of Buriburizaemon: The Lightning Chapter" (Japanese: ぶりぶりざえもんの冒険（電光編）) | December 25, 1995 |
| SPECIAL–10 | "Dramatic Crayon Shin-chan" (Japanese: 劇画クレヨンしんちゃん) | December 25, 1995 |
| SPECIAL–10 | "Shiro is Also a Lot of Work" (Japanese: シロもけっこう大変だゾ) | December 25, 1995 |
| SPECIAL–10 | "The Monkey-Crab Battle" (Japanese: さるかに合戦だゾ) | December 25, 1995 |
| SPECIAL–10 | "Dramatic Crayon Shin-chan 2" (Japanese: 劇画クレヨンしんちゃん2) | December 25, 1995 |
Shinnosuke and Oryu infiltrate the Shiranui family's hideout to save Princess Kaede. They call for the hero rescuer Buriburizaemon but... / Shinnosuke and co attempt to beat the Shiranui family with their haphazard tactics. Will he be able to save the princess? / ?? / ??

== 1996 ==
| No. | Title | Original release date |
|---|---|---|
| 172 | "I'm tired of rice cakes!" (Japanese: おモチはあきたゾ) | January 8, 1996 |
| 172 | "I have rice gruel!" (Japanese: 七草ガユを食べるゾ) | January 8, 1996 |
| 172 | "Dad's missing pocket money!" (Japanese: 父ちゃんのこづかいがないゾ) | January 8, 1996 |
Misae forces Shin-chan to eat rice cakes every day. So Shin-chan hides the box of rice cakes in different places in the house. / Hiroshi, Shin-chan, and Shiro go in search of 7 different leaves to cook a traditional dish. In the night, the family sits together and relishes it. / As Hiroshi finishes his pocket money, he finds ways to get money from Misae but fails at it and gives up.
| 173 | "Mom's coming-of-age celebration!" (Japanese: 母ちゃんの成人式だゾ) | January 15, 1996 |
| 173 | "I won't get out of the kotatsu!" (Japanese: こたつから出ないゾ) | January 15, 1996 |
| 173 | "I go to the department store with Dad!" (Japanese: 父ちゃんとデパートだゾ) | January 15, 1996 |
Misae and Shin-chan go for the coming of age day ceremony. Later, they enjoy themselves at a karaoke party. / As it is cold, Hiroshi and Misae refuse to get up from their comfortable zone. But, Shin-chan sends Hiroshi to the kitchen to bring tea for them. / Hiroshi and Shin-chan visit a supermarket to purchase a suit for Hiroshi. The suit section head embarrasses Hiroshi while taking the measurements.
| 174 | "Mom is trying to lose weight!" (Japanese: 母ちゃんの減量だゾ) | January 22, 1996 |
| 174 | "The Action Mask Man Evil genius!" (Japanese: アクション仮面 悪の天才!ツバインバッハ) | January 22, 1996 |
| 174 | "Mom had an accident!" (Japanese: 母ちゃんが事故ったゾ) | January 22, 1996 |
As Misae puts on weight, she tries hard to stop eating snacks. She reaches the sports club with Shin-chan, but finds out that they are closed. / As Tsubahinbaha brainwashes Eagle Head, Action Mask promises Mimiko to bring him back. Shin-chan learns that every person has a weakness. / Misae meets with an accident while driving. But the driver confesses the truth of watching TV while driving.
| 175 | "My true love" (Japanese: オラの本気の恋だゾ) | January 29, 1996 |
| 175 | "My confession of love" (Japanese: オラの恋の告白だゾ) | January 29, 1996 |
| 175 | "Hide-and-Seek with Shiro" (Japanese: シロとかくれんぼだゾ) | January 29, 1996 |
| 176 | "Just me and dad!" (Japanese: 父ちゃんと二人だゾ) | February 5, 1996 |
| 176 | "I play with a ball alone!" (Japanese: 一人でボール遊びだゾ) | February 5, 1996 |
| 176 | "It's the panty thief!" (Japanese: おパンツ泥棒が出たゾ) | February 5, 1996 |
As Misae goes out, Hiroshi takes Shin-chan's responsibility. Hiroshi takes care of Shin-chan and spends time with him. / Misae sends Shin-chan out to play with the ball. As the ball gets into a truck, Shin-chan also enters the truck and goes with the driver. / Misae and Shin-chan prepare a trap to get hold of a thief. But, Hiroshi falls into the trap. Later, Misae and Shin-chan realize their mistake.
| 177 | "Inviting over Miss Nanako" (Japanese: おねいさんをご招待だゾ) | February 12, 1996 |
| 177 | "First Time on Rollerblades" (Japanese: ローラー初すべりだゾ) | February 12, 1996 |
| 177 | "A Showdown on Rollerblades" (Japanese: ローラーで対決だゾ) | February 12, 1996 |
Misae and Shin-chan meet Nanako and invite her for lunch on Sunday. Shin-chan is excited to meet Nanako and wakes up at 5 am. He bathes, gets ready and cleans the house. Misae and Hiroshi are surprised to see Shin-chan do things on his own. Nanako reaches at 12pm and finds Shin-chan sleeping. After Nanako leaves, Shin-chan wakes up and gets angry at his parents. / ?? / ??
| 178 | "I go to the young lady's house" (Japanese: おねいさんちへ行くゾ) | February 19, 1996 |
| 178 | "The Action Mask Man Biggest crisis! His weak point revealed!" (Japanese: アクション仮面 最大の危機!あばかれた弱点) | February 19, 1996 |
| 178 | "I find a lost dog" (Japanese: たずね犬をさがすゾ) | February 19, 1996 |
Nanako invites Shin-chan to her place. Shin-chan falls asleep in the morning and loses the chance of meeting her. / In Action Mask series, Action Mask tries to save the world from Tsubahinbaha. Just then, Misae requests Shin-chan to help her, but he refuses. / Misae, Shin-chan, and Hiroshi go in search of a missing dog to earn a reward. Unfortunately, Patricia returns to her home.
| 179 | "The Inch-High Samurai Shin-chan is Here" (Japanese: 一寸ぼうしんちゃんだゾ) | February 26, 1996 |
| 179 | "I Broke the Glass" (Japanese: ガラスを割ったゾ) | February 26, 1996 |
| 179 | "We Don't Have Money for Dinner" (Japanese: 夕食のお金がないゾ) | February 26, 1996 |
| 180 | "I don't want to go home" (Japanese: オラ帰りたくないゾ) | March 4, 1996 |
| 180 | "A thrilling sleepover" (Japanese: ドキドキの外泊だゾ) | March 4, 1996 |
| 180 | "Cassette Radio Surgery" (Japanese: ラジカセ君のシジツだゾ) | March 4, 1996 |
Shin-chan and Misae meet Nanako. As Shin-chan doesn't wish to go home, Nanako asks Misae to let him stay with her for a night. / Shin-chan stays back at Nanako's house for a night. He gets scared in the night, but acts strong and pretends to be fine. / Shin-chan notices Misae’s music player and assembles it. Later, when Misae returns home and sees the music player, Shin-chan escapes from there.
| 181 | "The monkey's intrusion!" (Japanese: おサルが乱入したゾ) | March 11, 1996 |
| 181 | "My hair's getting long!" (Japanese: オラの髪が伸びたゾ) | March 11, 1996 |
| 181 | "Action Mask Man risks his life! The final battle!" (Japanese: アクション仮面 命をかけて!最後の決戦) | March 11, 1996 |
A monkey enters Misae's house and scares everyone. Shin-chan and the monkey get attached to each other. But the owner of the monkey takes him back. / Shin-chan pours Hiroshi's hair oil on his head. Then, when Shin-chan goes to sleep, Misae puts a wig over his head and fools him for tampering Hiroshi's hair oil and lying. / Action Mask and Mimiko's brother fight Tsubahinbaha. Shin-chan feels happy to see Action Mask alive after the fight.
| 182 | "I shine shoes!" (Japanese: クツみがきをするゾ) | March 18, 1996 |
| 182 | "I'm a cute shoeshine boy!" (Japanese: かわいいくつみがき屋さんだゾ) | March 18, 1996 |
| 182 | "Kazama-kun's secret note!" (Japanese: 風間君の秘密ノートだゾ) | March 18, 1996 |
Shin-chan polishes Hiroshi's and Misae's shoes to earn pocket money but ruins them. Later, he applies polish on Misae's and his face. / Shin-chan opens a shoe polish shop and polishes Ryuko's shoes. Later, Shin-chan hands over the shop to Ryuko and goes away. / Shin-chan finds Kazama's diary with many flower circles drawn on it. Later, he gets to know that it is normal to have an upset stomach.
| SPECIAL–11 | "Momotaro’s companion" (Japanese: 桃太郎のお供だゾ) | April 12, 1996 |
| SPECIAL–11 | "A burst of laughter gag" (Japanese: 爆笑連発ギャグだゾ) | April 12, 1996 |
| SPECIAL–11 | "A peaceful day in Shiro" (Japanese: シロののどかな一日だゾ) | April 12, 1996 |
| SPECIAL–11 | "Resurrection! Hell’s sales lady" (Japanese: 復活! 地獄のセールスレディだゾ) | April 12, 1996 |
| 183 | "A new record for being late to kindergarten!" (Japanese: チコクの新記録だゾ) | April 19, 1996 |
| 183 | "Addictive mail-order shopping!" (Japanese: 通販はクセになるゾ) | April 19, 1996 |
| 183 | "A peaceful sleep" (Japanese: 平和な眠りだゾ) | April 19, 1996 |
Shin-chan refuses to wake up to go to school, but Misae stays determined on sending him and hands over Shin-chan to Yoshinaga in his night clothes. Even after reaching school, Shin-chan finds it difficult to open his eyes. / Misae takes a catalog from Kitamoto. However, the order list menu gets into Shin-chan's hands, and he orders his favorite things without letting Misae know about it. / ??
| 184 | "Miss Yoshinaga's spring is just around the corner!" (Japanese: よしなが先生の春は近いゾ) | April 26, 1996 |
| 184 | "Shopping by taxi!" (Japanese: タクシーで買い物だゾ) | April 26, 1996 |
| 184 | "I'm an elder in a wake!" (Japanese: オラはおやつ長者だゾ) | April 26, 1996 |
Shin-chan and his friends go to Yoshinaga's house. Ishigawa comes there and tells Yoshinaga that he will introduce her to his parents. / In spite of rushing in a taxi, Misae and Shin-chan miss on the discount held for the first 100 customers in a supermarket. / Shin-chan feels sad as Misae refuses to give him sweets. He goes out and helps a small child and gets a royal treatment in return.
| 185 | "I go to Hokkaido with my family!" (Japanese: オラ達家族で北海道へ行くゾ) | May 3, 1996 |
| 185 | "I eat Hokkaido!" (Japanese: 北海道を食べちゃうゾ) | May 3, 1996 |
| 185 | "A broken-down rental car!" (Japanese: レンタカーがこわれたゾ) | May 3, 1996 |
Hiroshi and his family plan a trip to Hokkaido. They come across many obstacles on their way. But somehow, they board the flight. / After reaching Hokkaido, the family eats plenty of food to satisfy their desires. As a result, they land up in the hospital. / Hiroshi and his family rent a car, but the car breaks down on the way. So, they stay with a family in their farmhouse for the night.
| 186 | "I go and see the bear's farm!" (Japanese: クマさんの牧場を見物するゾ) | May 10, 1996 |
| 186 | "Relax in the open-air bath" (Japanese: 露天風呂でくつろぐゾ) | May 10, 1996 |
| 186 | "Saying good-bye to Hokkaido!" (Japanese: 北海道とサヨナラだゾ) | May 10, 1996 |
After getting another car, Hiroshi and his family visit a bear farm and feed the bears. Shin-chan acts stubborn and asks the instructor to give him bear food as given to the bears. / ??? / Hiroshi and his family watch the seals through binoculars. Misae fulfills her wish of driving a car in Hokkaido. On the flight, while Misae calculates the expenses, Shin-chan eats bear food and bids goodbye to Hokkaido.
| 187 | "Masterpiece? "A hula-dancing dog!"" (Japanese: 世界迷作?フラダンスの犬だゾ) | May 17, 1996 |
| 187 | "Cultural festival at a girls' high school!" (Japanese: 女子高の文化祭だゾ) | May 17, 1996 |
| 187 | "Only looking at new cars!" (Japanese: 新車は見るだけだゾ) | May 17, 1996 |
The narrator tells us a story about Oshiro, his grandfather, and his dog, Shin-chan, who wins cash and pays off the family's debt. / At a culture fest held in a girls' school, Kazama fails to control his movements while Shin-chan promotes noodles at a counter. / Hiroshi and his family visit a showroom to check on a new car. Hiroshi shows interest in buying a new car, but Misae refuses.
| 188 | "Deciding to buy a new car!" (Japanese: 新車を買う気になったゾ) | May 24, 1996 |
| 188 | "Rice planting is fun!" (Japanese: 田植えは楽しいゾ) | May 24, 1996 |
| 188 | "It is hard to pee correctly!" (Japanese: おしっこの作法はむずかしいゾ) | May 24, 1996 |
A car sales representative takes Hiroshi, Misae, and Shin-chan on a test drive to convince them to buy a car. / The school takes the students to a rice farm. Matsuzaka plants the weeds in a different way as she belongs to a farmer's family. / Misae tells Shin-chan to clean the toilet. Shin-chan uses Misae's expensive bath towel and gets scolding from her.
| 189 | "We finally bought a new car!" (Japanese: ついに新車を買ったゾ) | June 7, 1996 |
| 189 | "I go into action to save the pet!" (Japanese: ペットをお助けに出動するゾ) | June 7, 1996 |
| 189 | "Eating out at the noodle shop!" (Japanese: おそば屋さんで外食だゾ) | June 7, 1996 |
Hiroshi, Misae, and Shin-chan purchase a new car. But Misae puts the car into the bushes while parking the car. / The Kasukabe Defence Force gets on a mission to save animals and birds. Kazama brings few cats, which Shin-chan sells for free. / Misae, Shin-chan, and Hiroshi go out for lunch to a random restaurant they find empty. At first, they hesitate. But, when the food arrives, they all relish it.
| 190 | "Big Crisis for Mom & Dad" (Japanese: 父ちゃん母ちゃん最大の危機だゾ) | June 14, 1996 |
Shin-chan plays with Misae's lipstick and leaves a kiss mark on Hiroshi's shirt which causes Misae to suspect he's cheating on her and kicks him out of the house. Later when Misae realizes the kiss mark was Shin-chan's doing, she searches for Hiroshi only to find a drunk Rie embracing him.
| 191 | "The ballet of Mom and me!" (Japanese: オラと母ちゃんのバレエだゾ) | June 21, 1996 |
| 191 | "Playing tag with a young lady!" (Japanese: おねいさんと鬼ごっこだゾ) | June 21, 1996 |
| 191 | "Is Mom Gonna Die?" (Japanese: 母ちゃんが死んじゃうゾ?) | June 21, 1996 |
Misae takes up Ballerina classes to get rid of her weight. But, the assistant breaks his back bone after lifting Misae. / Hiroshi and Shin-chan go to a park and play the hide-and-seek game with Nanako and Shinobu. Just then, Misae reaches there and beats him up. / Shin-chan assumes that Misae will be dying soon and feels sad about it. However, Misae tells Hiroshi that she is pregnant.
| 192 | "I'm Songoku" (Japanese: オラは孫悟空だゾ) | June 28, 1996 |
| 192 | "I want an autograph from the famous manga artist" (Japanese: 有名まんが家のサインが欲しいゾ) | June 28, 1996 |
| 192 | "Following artificial respiration" (Japanese: 人工呼吸をならうゾ) | June 28, 1996 |
The narrator tells a story of Shin-chan and his family, who meet a man with magical powers but is trapped in a lady devil's house. Shin-chan uses the magical wand against the lady devil and saves the man. / Shin-chan and Masao go to Yoshi's house to get an autograph from him. However, Yoshi tries to escape from Shin-chan and Masao. He gets irritated on the kids and decides to go on a leave. / ???
| 193 | "Mom is three-month's pregnant!" (Japanese: 母ちゃんはにんしん3カ月だゾ) | July 5, 1996 |
| 193 | "My collection!" (Japanese: オラのコレクションだゾ) | July 5, 1996 |
| 193 | "I can't stop reading at the bookstore!" (Japanese: 立ち読みはやめられないゾ) | July 5, 1996 |
As Misae is pregnant, she feels like vomiting with the smell of food. She tries to stay away from food. But finally, she pukes. / Shin-chan collects cardboard toilet rolls from the entire neighborhood as a hobby. / A sales person tries to stop Shin-chan from reading books, but he fails. Instead, Shin-chan teaches the sales person a trick of reading books.
| 194 | "I follow along with antenatal training!" (Japanese: 胎教にご協力するゾ) | July 12, 1996 |
| 194 | "Kazama's in love" (Japanese: 風間君が恋しちゃったゾ) | July 12, 1996 |
| 194 | "Saving Kazama's love!" (Japanese: 恋する風間君をお助けするゾ) | July 12, 1996 |
Misae scolds Shin-chan for disturbing her. But later, she realizes her mistake and makes him read a book for her. / A girl shouts at Kazama for fighting with Shin-chan on the road. Kazama feels bad when he remembers the girl's words. / Kazama stays upset in school on remembering the girl who scolded him. However, Kazama feels relieved when the same girl smiles at him for helping an old man.
| 195 | "Kaiden / Yuki Onna is terrifying" (Japanese: 怪談・雪女はおそろしいゾ) | July 19, 1996 |
| 195 | "Yoshinaga-sensei is happy and crying" (Japanese: よしなが先生うれし泣きだゾ) | July 19, 1996 |
| 195 | "The dentist is not scared" (Japanese: 歯医者さんはこわくないゾ) | July 19, 1996 |
| 196 | "I got a new mom!" (Japanese: 新しいママを作ったゾ) | July 26, 1996 |
| 196 | "Looking for a ball in the pool" (Japanese: プールで玉さがしだゾ) | July 26, 1996 |
| 196 | "I take care of pregnant Mom!" (Japanese: 妊しん母ちゃんを大切にするゾ) | July 26, 1996 |
Misae refuses to give Shin-chan any food to eat as he wastes the vegetables. In the night, as Shin-chan feels hungry, he begs for food from Misae and promises to not waste any vegetables in future. / ??? / Misae sets rules for Hiroshi and Shin-chan to follow during her pregnancy. She blackmails Hiroshi to do the housework and goes to sleep. The next day, she gets to know that she has put on weight.
| 197 | "Hiking Up the Mountain" (Japanese: 遠足で山に登るゾ) | August 2, 1996 |
| 197 | "Lost in the Mountains" (Japanese: 山でソーナンしちゃったゾ) | August 2, 1996 |
| 197 | "We Survive Together" (Japanese: みんなでサバイバルするゾ) | August 2, 1996 |
The school takes the students on a mountain trek. But Shin-chan, Masao, Bo-chan and Kazama get lost during the trek. / Shin-chan and his friends take shelter in a cave for the night. Yoshinaga gets worried about the kids but Matsuzaka calms her down. / In the morning, the kids try to find a way out. They eat mushrooms to calm their hunger and use fire to help the teachers find their location.
| 198 | "Being elegant is uncomfortable!" (Japanese: お上品はキュークツだゾ) | August 9, 1996 |
| 198 | "Race between a rabbit and Shin-chan's turtle!" (Japanese: ウサギとしんちゃん亀の競争だゾ) | August 9, 1996 |
| 198 | "Red Scorpion Group doing part-time work at the pool!" (Japanese: プールでバイトの紅さそり隊だゾ) | August 9, 1996 |
Misae instructs Hiroshi and Shin-chan about creating a happy environment in the house. But she refuses to keep up with the instructions. / The narrator tells a story of two tortoises, Shin-chan and Masao. Shin-chan wins the race against a rabbit and saves Masao. / The Saitama Crimson Scorpions take up a job of pool watching the children. But, Shin-chan irritates them and gets them out of their job.
| SPECIAL–12 | "Buriburizaemon’s Adventure Fengyun Yokai Castle" | August 16, 1996 |
| 199 | "The baby is either a boy or a girl!" (Japanese: 赤ちゃんは男か女だゾ) | August 23, 1996 |
| 199 | "I'm an assistant to a famous manga artist!" (Japanese: 有名マンガ家のアシスタントだゾ) | August 23, 1996 |
| 199 | "I play with Dad in the park!" (Japanese: 父ちゃんと公園で遊ぶゾ) | August 23, 1996 |
Misae goes to the hospital with Shin-chan for a checkup and finds out that her baby is healthy. Both, Hiroshi and Misae get excited. / Masao and Shin-chan visit Yoshi for the job of an assistant. While cutting a paper, Yoshi cuts his finger. Then, he is taken to the hospital. / When Hiroshi and Shin-chan go to a park, few ladies create a wrong perception about Hiroshi because of Shin-chan's habits.
| 200 | "Dad got a love letter" (Japanese: 父ちゃんがラブレターもらったゾ) | August 30, 1996 |
| 200 | "A disaster with a love letter" (Japanese: ラブレターで災難だゾ) | August 30, 1996 |
| 200 | "I go along with Mom's debut in the park!" (Japanese: 公園デビューにつきあうゾ) | August 30, 1996 |
Keiko and Misae take their kids to the park to make friends with the other parents. Keiko tries to talk to a group of ladies but creates a bad impression among them. Later, when Shin-chan plays the 'action rangers' game with few other children, Keiko asks Shin-chan to involve Hitoshi as well in the game. Then, the other parents confront Keiko and Misae and talk to them.
| 201 | "Aunt Masae is back!" (Japanese: マサエおばさんがまた来たゾ) | September 6, 1996 |
| 201 | "Miho-chan, the man in love" (Japanese: 恋するオトメのミホちゃんだゾ) | September 6, 1996 |
| 201 | "Rehearsing delivery!" (Japanese: 出産のリハーサルをするゾ) | September 6, 1996 |
Masae and Ginnosuke visit Misae to help her in the household work. They take up the responsibility of cleaning the house and Shin-chan also joins them. But at the end, they mess the house again. / ??? / Kitamoto trains Shin-chan and Misae for an emergency and makes them rehearse the steps to be followed during labor pain. Shin-chan plays his role well by calling the necessary numbers.
| 202 | "Kio, the world’s mischief" (Japanese: 世界迷作しんのキオだゾ) | September 13, 1996 |
| 202 | "I get my ball back!" (Japanese: ボールをとりもどすゾ) | September 13, 1996 |
| 202 | "I be Mom's bodyguard!" (Japanese: 母ちゃんのボディーガードをするゾ) | September 13, 1996 |
??? / Masao loses the ball in a neighbor's property. As Shin-chan and Masao get afraid of the pet dog, they use a piece of meat to divert the dog's mind and take the ball back. / Shin-chan joins Misae to the hospital for a regular checkup as her bodyguard. Shin-chan promises the doctor that he will take care of Misae. But on the way home, Shin-chan sleeps and Misae carries Shin-chan on her back.
| SPECIAL–13 | "The Super Hero, Iron Shin-chan!" (Japanese: 超ヒーロー 鉄骨しんちゃんだゾ) | September 27, 1996 |
| SPECIAL–13 | "Dad's Working Hard Too!" (Japanese: 父ちゃんもがんばってるゾ) | September 27, 1996 |
| SPECIAL–13 | "It Looks Like the Baby's Coming!" (Japanese: 赤ちゃんが生まれそうだゾ) | September 27, 1996 |
| SPECIAL–13 | "The Baby is Coming!" (Japanese: 赤ちゃんが生まれるゾ) | September 27, 1996 |
| SPECIAL–13 | "The Baby is Here!" (Japanese: 赤ちゃんが生まれたゾ) | September 27, 1996 |
| SPECIAL–13 | "The All-Star, Dream Skit Festival!" (Japanese: オールスター夢のコント祭だゾ) | September 27, 1996 |
| 203 | "The baby's back!" (Japanese: 赤ちゃんのお帰りだゾ) | October 11, 1996 |
| 203 | "Soothing your baby" (Japanese: 赤ちゃんをあやすゾ) | October 11, 1996 |
| 203 | "I'm sooooo sleepy!" (Japanese: 眠くて眠くて眠たい一日だゾ) | October 11, 1996 |
Hiroshi hands over the cleaning responsibility to Shin-chan and goes to the hospital to bring Misae home. Shin-chan cleans the house by hiding the mess in the lawn and welcomes the newborn baby. / ??? / Shin-chan feels sleepy throughout the day. He tries hard to sleep but gets disturbed every time. In the night, Shin-chan stays awake and watches a TV program with his sister.
| 204 | "Taking a photo of a family of four!" (Japanese: 家族4人の記念写真だゾ) | October 18, 1996 |
| 204 | "Thinking up the baby's name!" (Japanese: 赤ちゃんの名前を考えるゾ) | October 18, 1996 |
| 204 | "Deciding on the baby's name!" (Japanese: 赤ちゃんの名前が決まったゾ) | October 18, 1996 |
| 204 | "(Baby Name Announcement)" (Japanese: （赤ちゃんの名前発表）) | October 18, 1996 |
Hiroshi uses his new camera to click a family picture. But Shin-chan drops the camera and breaks it. / Hiroshi, Misae, and Shin-chan think of names for the baby. Hiroshi thinks of his female colleague's name and gets scolding from Misae. / All the family members play a game and choose a name decided by Shin-chan. They name the baby Himawari.
| 205 | "I'm a sweet brother!" (Japanese: オラはやさしいお兄ちゃんだゾ) | October 25, 1996 |
| 205 | "Combat! The Red Scorpion Group!" (Japanese: 決闘! 紅さそり隊だゾ) | October 25, 1996 |
| 205 | "I go to buy diapers in the middle of the night!" (Japanese: 夜中におむつを買いに行くゾ) | October 25, 1996 |
Misae leaves the baby with Hiroshi and Shin-chan and goes shopping. The baby starts crying for milk. But Misae returns and feeds the baby. / Shin-chan and his school friends follow the Saitama Crimson Scorpions and their enemies and get lost. But the girls help find them. / Shin-chan and Hiroshi go out to get baby diapers. As they reach home late, Misae gets angry on Hiroshi and beats him up.
| 206 | "I introduce Himawari!" (Japanese: ひまわりをご紹介するゾ) | November 1, 1996 |
| 206 | "Going for a picnic!" (Japanese: おねいさんとピクニックだゾ) | November 1, 1996 |
| 206 | "Home visit by the director of the kindergarten!" (Japanese: 園長先生の家庭訪問だゾ) | November 1, 1996 |
Shin-chan's friends meet Himawari. The kids carry Himawari one by one. And Kazama shares his knowledge about babies. / Nanako goes for a picnic with Mashiro and Shin-chan. But Shin-chan's habits lead Nanako and Mashiro into an argument. / The neighbors misunderstand the principal's tone of speaking to Shin-chan and call the cops. But, Shin-chan doesn't favour the principal.
| 207 | "I run away with Shiro!" (Japanese: シロと一緒にカケオチするゾ) | November 8, 1996 |
| 207 | "I try pottery!" (Japanese: とーげいに挑戦するゾ) | November 8, 1996 |
| 207 | "Mom likes to collect points!" (Japanese: 母ちゃんはポイント好きだゾ) | November 8, 1996 |
Shin-chan and Shiro feel ignored and leave the house. But Hiroshi brings them home. Then, Misae expresses her concern towards Shin-chan. / The principal takes the students to a pottery farm. The children create potteries using their imagination. / Misae gets to know that the more stamps she collects, the more gifts she will receive. Thereafter, she gets obsessed with stamps.
| 208 | "I'm a good baby-sitter!" (Japanese: オラは子守上手だゾ) | November 15, 1996 |
| 208 | "I run a bookstore with a famous manga artist!" (Japanese: 有名マンガ家と本屋さんだゾ) | November 15, 1996 |
| 208 | "Opening a Bank Account" (Japanese: オラだけの銀行口座を作ったゾ) | November 15, 1996 |
Misae gives Shin-chan a toy doll and goes out with Himawari. But Shin-chan messes the house while taking care of the doll. / Shin-chan meets Yoshi at a bookstore and asks him to sign a poster pasted on the ceiling. While signing, Yoshi slips and injures himself. / Misae opens a bank account for Shin-chan and Himawari. Shin-chan thinks that the bank has fooled him when the amount doesn't increase.
| 209 | "The Kyushu Grandparents Visit" (Japanese: 九州のじいちゃん達が来たゾ) | November 22, 1996 |
| 209 | "Out with Two Grandpas" (Japanese: 二人のじいちゃんと出かけるゾ) | November 22, 1996 |
| 209 | "I'm Shinnosuke, the Businessman" (Japanese: オラはサラリーマンしんのすけだゾ) | November 22, 1996 |
Misae's parents and Hiroshi's parents come to meet the baby. But Ginnosuke and Yoshiji don't agree with each other and have an argument. / Yoshiji and Ginnosuke take Shin-chan to the National museum. Later, Ginnosuke and Shin-chan confess that Yoshiji is strict but a nice man. / Shin-chan pretends to be a salaried man and goes to Hiroshi's office. And when Shin-chan reaches home late, Misae spanks him.
| 210 | "The Grandpas Face Off" (Japanese: 二人のじいちゃんの対決だゾ) | November 29, 1996 |
| 210 | ""Playing House" Gets Real" (Japanese: 実録おままごとだゾ) | November 29, 1996 |
| 210 | "Miss Matsuzaka is stuck at an arranged introduction" (Japanese: お見合いに燃えるまつざか先生だゾ) | November 29, 1996 |
Yoshiji and Ginnosuke have an argument on a petty issue. The next day, as Ginnosuke's flight gets canceled, Yoshiji too refuses to go back home and continues arguing with Ginnosuke. / In the family game, Shin-chan enacts the exact reaction of Misae when Hiroshi returns home. / Matsuzaka goes to an arranged marriage party and meets a man named Noda, but her sister, Take spoils her meeting.
| 211 | "Office worker Shinnosuke entertainment is fun" (Japanese: サラリーマンしんのすけ接待は楽しいゾ) | December 6, 1996 |
| 211 | "Himawari's vaccination!" (Japanese: ひまわりの初めての注射だゾ) | December 6, 1996 |
| 211 | "A day at the departmental store!" (Japanese: デパートで子守だゾ) | December 6, 1996 |
??? / Misae takes Himawari to the doctor for a vaccination dose. On seeing a handsome doctor, Himawari cries aloud so that the handsome doctor carries her. / Misae leaves Himawari and Shin-chan with Hiroshi and goes shopping alone. While Hiroshi goes to the washroom, a housekeeping staff takes Shin-chan and Himawari to the lost and found department. Shin-chan and Himawari trouble the staff there.
| 212 | "Both Grandpas Visit Again" (Japanese: 二人のじいちゃんがまた来たゾ) | December 13, 1996 |
| 212 | "Kasukabe prevention team" (Japanese: 和菓子強盗をふせぐゾ) | December 13, 1996 |
| 212 | "Miss Matsuzaka's Doomed Marriage Meeting" (Japanese: まつざか先生のこりないお見合いだゾ) | December 13, 1996 |
Yoshiji and Ginnosuke meet at the station and argue with each other. They continue arguing even after reaching Hiroshi’s house. / Shin-chan and his friends team up as part of the Kasukabe prevention force. But, they suspect the wrong people. / The principal and his wife arrange a meeting for Matsuzaka with a possible suitor for her. But Matsuzaka’s elder sisters ruin the meeting.
| 213 | "Christmas Party with Schoolchildren" (Japanese: 小学生とクリスマス会だゾ) | December 20, 1996 |
| 213 | "Selling Christmas Cakes" (Japanese: クリスマスにはケーキだゾ) | December 20, 1996 |
| 213 | "Looking Forward to My Present from Santa" (Japanese: サンタのプレゼントが楽しみだゾ) | December 20, 1996 |
A group of volunteers entertain the school children and put up an act on account of Christmas. / Ryuko, Ogin and Mary put up a stall to sell Christmas cakes. Shin-chan helps them in marketing the cakes. / Hiroshi forgets Shin-chan’s Christmas gift. But he makes an effort to buy a Christmas gift for Shin-chan on Christmas Eve.
| SPECIAL–14 | "Detective Nohara’s Case Files" (Japanese: 野原刑事の事件簿だゾ) | December 27, 1996 |
| SPECIAL–14 | "Cooking Confrontation With the Young Strongman" (Japanese: 少年鉄人と料理対決だゾ) | December 27, 1996 |
| SPECIAL–14 | "Detective Nohara’s Case Files 2" (Japanese: 野原刑事の事件簿2だゾ) | December 27, 1996 |
| SPECIAL–14 | "Major Cleanup With Everyone" (Japanese: みんなで大そうじだゾ) | December 27, 1996 |
| SPECIAL–14 | "Detective Nohara’s Case Files 3" (Japanese: 野原刑事の事件簿3だゾ) | December 27, 1996 |
| SPECIAL–14 | "Looking Back at the Past Year" (Japanese: 今年一年のふりかえりだゾ) | December 27, 1996 |

== 1997 ==
| No. | Title | Original release date |
|---|---|---|
| SPECIAL–15 | "Sci-fi murder cyborg" (Japanese: SF殺人サイボーグだゾ) | January 3, 1997 |
| SPECIAL–15 | "New Year’s Day for everyone" (Japanese: 全員集合のお正月だゾ) | January 3, 1997 |
| SPECIAL–15 | "A great game and exciting" (Japanese: すごろく勝負で盛り上がるゾ) | January 3, 1997 |
| SPECIAL–15 | "Going to buy a lucky bag" (Japanese: 福袋を買いに行くゾ) | January 3, 1997 |
| SPECIAL–15 | "The New Year of the 3 Matsuzaka sisters" (Japanese: まつざか3姉妹のお正月だゾ) | January 3, 1997 |
| 214 | "The Baby Crawl Race" (Japanese: ひまわりのハイハイ特訓だゾ) | January 10, 1997 |
| 214 | "Saving a Lost Child" (Japanese: 迷子のめんどうを見るゾ) | January 10, 1997 |
| 214 | "Spying on Ishizaka" (Japanese: よしなが先生の恋の危機だゾ) | January 10, 1997 |
Misae and Shin-chan decide to get Himawari into a baby crawl race for a reward. / Shin-chan takes the responsibility of uniting a lost child and his mother. Misae feels proud of Shin-chan. / Yoshinaga joins the Kasukabe Defence Force and spies on Ishizaka, her male friend, to know about his affairs.
| 215 | "Burdened with Housework" (Japanese: おねいさんの一日母ちゃんだゾ) | January 17, 1997 |
| 215 | "I Don't Like Cold Days" (Japanese: 寒い日はにがてだゾ) | January 17, 1997 |
| 215 | "A Baby Car or a Ferrari" (Japanese: ベビーカーで競争だゾ) | January 17, 1997 |
As Misae gets a fever, Hiroshi and Shin-chan take Nanako’s help in cooking. Misae gets angry as they praise Nanako’s food and assigns them more work. / Shin-chan and the other school children refuse to play due to the cold weather. Yoshinaga teaches them exercises to feel warm and catches a cold. / Misae services an old baby car for Himawari. But Shin-chan breaks down the baby car while playing.
| 216 | "The protagonist of the video" (Japanese: ビデオの主役はオラだゾ) | January 24, 1997 |
| 216 | "Brothers Need Love, Too" (Japanese: お兄ちゃんだって甘えたいゾ) | January 24, 1997 |
| 216 | "Salaryman Shinnosuke Goes on a Business Trip" (Japanese: サラリーマンしんのすけ出張に行くゾ) | January 24, 1997 |
Hiroshi decides to film some home videos of their children. However, he and Misae pay more attention to Himawari causing Shin-chan to feel left out. / Shin-chan feels hurt as Hiroshi and Misae pay more attention towards Himawari and runs away after an argument with them. But Hiroshi and Misae realise their mistake and express their love towards Shin-chan. / Shin-chan travels for a business trip with Misae and Kawaguchi. Shin-chan's ideas fail, but Misae’s thoughts help her bag the project from the client.
| 217 | "Dad Gives Himawari a Bath" (Japanese: お風呂の係は父ちゃんだゾ) | January 31, 1997 |
| 217 | "A Day with Miss Marilyn" (Japanese: セクシーマリリン台風だゾ) | January 31, 1997 |
| 217 | "Escape from school" (Japanese: 幼稚園から脱出するゾ) | January 31, 1997 |
Hiroshi, unwillingly, gives Himawari a bath. Next day, Misae emotionally blackmails Hiroshi to give Shin-chan and Himawari a bath. / A sales executive named Marilyn Mayoshi visits Shin-chan’s school for her magazine evaluation and spends time with the children. / Shin-chan refuses to go to school assuming Himawari is sick. He wreaks havoc by running around in the school.
| 218 | "Dad is Suffering from a Back Pain" (Japanese: スキー場でリゾートするゾ) | February 7, 1997 |
| 218 | "Duplicate of Matsuzaka" (Japanese: 謎の美女とスキー教室だゾ) | February 7, 1997 |
| 218 | "A Day at the Gaming Center" (Japanese: スキーの後でも遊んじゃうゾ) | February 7, 1997 |
Hiroshi takes his family to a resort apartment, where he injures his back while locking the tyre of the car. / Matsuzaka and Shin-chan take skiing lessons from an instructor at the skiing resort. Shin-chan ruins Matsuzaka’s efforts to impress the instructor. / Shin-chan and his family play the shooting game and claw crane game at a gaming centre. Matsuzaka tries her luck in the arm wrestling game.
| 219 | "Something is Fishy" (Japanese: 野原一家のバレンタインだゾ) | February 14, 1997 |
| 219 | "Assistant Manager Plays Golf" (Japanese: サラリーマンしんのすけゴルフで遊んじゃうゾ) | February 14, 1997 |
| 219 | "Matsuzaka's Gift for a Special Person" (Japanese: まつざか先生のバレンタイン勝負だゾ) | February 14, 1997 |
Misae brings chocolates to surprise Hiroshi on Valentine’s Day. But Shin-chan and Himawari disturb Hiroshi and Misae’s moment together. / Shin-chan and Kazama play golf as the assistant manager and manager. Shin-chan plays golf shots by fluke and impresses everyone. / Matsuzaka prepares chocolates for a special person on account of Valentine’s Day. But she expresses her love to the principal.
| 220 | "Buying Dolls for Himawari" (Japanese: ひな人形を買いに行くゾ) | February 21, 1997 |
| 220 | "Will the Kitten Find a Home" (Japanese: マリリンがまた来たゾ) | February 21, 1997 |
| 220 | "It's cold in the city (Going to School During a Snowstorm)" (Japanese: 雪の降る街は寒くてつらいゾ) | February 21, 1997 |
A sales executive blackmails Misae to buy dolls on the occasion of the Doll’s Day. Misses gets emotional and buys many dolls. / Marilyn visits the school with a stray cat. She forcefully hands over the cat’s responsibility to Matsuzaka. / As Shin-chan misses his school bus, Misae takes Shin-chan on the cycle. After facing the heavy snowstorm, she learns that the school has been shut.
| 221 | "Dad Forgot Something" (Japanese: 父ちゃんの忘れ物をお届けするゾ) | March 7, 1997 |
| 221 | "Delivery by Train" (Japanese: 電車に乗ってお届けするゾ) | March 7, 1997 |
| 221 | "Getting Lost on the Way" (Japanese: お届け途中で迷子になったゾ) | March 7, 1997 |
Hiroshi requests Misae to deliver his important documents to his office. Shin-chan forcefully tags along with Misae. / Misae boards the train with Shin-chan and Himawari. In the course of getting her bag back from the train, she gets separated from her children. / Shin-chan and Himawari get separated from Misae. Shin-chan favours the chairman of Hiroshi’s company and saves Hiroshi’s job.
| 222 | "Has Himawari been Kidnapped?" (Japanese: ひまわりが消えちゃったゾ) | March 14, 1997 |
| 222 | "We're Looking for Marilyn" (Japanese: ネコのお世話も大変だゾ) | March 14, 1997 |
| 222 | "Are Principal's Spectacles Magical?" (Japanese: 勇気の出るサングラスだゾ) | March 14, 1997 |
Misae and Shin-chan do not find Himawari in the house and assume she has been kidnapped. But in fact, Himawari plays with a keychain in the house. / Matsuzaka’s cat Marilyn goes away from the house and hides in a pipe. Matsuzaka gets worried for her and brings her back home. / Masao wears the principal’s glasses and displays strength and confidence. He saves a girl named Megumi Yamura from the senior students from Rose Class, Hitoshi and Terunobu.
| 223 | "New Clothes for Himawari" (Japanese: ひまわりの洋服を買いまくるゾ) | March 21, 1997 |
| 223 | "Marilyn Has a New Friend" (Japanese: まつざか先生ネコの縁結びだゾ) | March 21, 1997 |
| 223 | "Sleepless Nights with Himawari" (Japanese: ひまわりの夜泣きは大迷惑だゾ) | March 21, 1997 |
Misae gets excited with the children’s clothes and brings a bag full of new and expensive clothes without letting Hiroshi know about it. / Matsuzaka gets a marriage proposal for her cat Marilyn. She agrees and leaves Marilyn with her new owner. / Himawari disturbs Misae and Hiroshi’s sleep. Hence, Misae wakes Shin-chan in the night to keep Himawari entertained.
| 224 | "Leave My Hand, Himawari" (Japanese: ひまわりにつかまれちゃったゾ) | April 4, 1997 |
| 224 | "I Want to Play in the Wet Cement" (Japanese: 生コンクリートにさわりたいゾ) | April 4, 1997 |
| 224 | "The future of Himawari is a sympathy" (Japanese: ひまわりの将来がシンパイだゾ) | April 4, 1997 |
Shin-chan touches Himawari’s cheeks continuously. Himawari holds Shin-chan’s finger and refuses to let go of him. But as Shin-chan fails to control his bowel movements, he excretes in his underwear. / Shin-chan’s neighbour builds a concrete entrance and asks her maid to keep an eye on it. Shin-chan plays in the cement and troubles the neighbour and her maid. / ??
| 225 | "I Need to Take a Bath for Nanako" (Japanese: ひまわりとお風呂は大変だゾ) | April 11, 1997 |
| 225 | "Nanako Pampers Himawari" (Japanese: ひまわりはオラより人気者だゾ) | April 11, 1997 |
| 225 | "Matsuzaka-sensei and a younger boy" (Japanese: まつざか先生と年下の男の子だゾ) | April 11, 1997 |
Shin-chan refuses to take a bath. But when he gets the news that Nanako has prepared cookies for him and will be visiting him soon, he rushes to the bathroom and takes a bath. / Nanako visits Shin-chan and his family. Shin-chan gets jealous of Himawari as Nanako pays more attention towards her. So, Nanako pampers Shin-chan as well and makes him realise the responsibilities of a brother. / ??
| SPECIAL–16 | "Happy Prince and Swallow Shin-chan" (Japanese: 幸せ王子とツバメのしんちゃんだゾ) | April 18, 1997 |
| SPECIAL–16 | "Going out to see the cherry blossoms" (Japanese: お花見に出かけるゾ) | April 18, 1997 |
| SPECIAL–16 | "Naughty Himarin" (Japanese: いたずらヒマリンだゾ) | April 18, 1997 |
| 226 | "Himawari Loves Glitter" (Japanese: ひまわりは光り物が大好きだゾ) | April 25, 1997 |
| 226 | "A Fraud Sales Representative" (Japanese: ひまわりと地獄のセールスレディだゾ) | April 25, 1997 |
| 226 | "The Three Baby-sitters" (Japanese: ベビーシッター紅さそり隊だゾ) | April 25, 1997 |
Himawari gets attracted towards Misae, Shin-chan and Hiroshi’s sparkling belongings and hides them. / A sales representative named Kurio tries to trap Misae into buying an expensive set of books. But the neighbour gets him caught by the police. / Ryuko, Ogin and Mary do a part-time job of babysitting Shin-chan and Himawari. They manage to take care of Himawari and Shin-chan’s mischief.
| 227 | "Children's Day" (Japanese: 今日は男の子の日だゾ) | May 2, 1997 |
| 227 | "A Tea Ceremony at Nene-chan's Place" (Japanese: お茶会におよばれしちゃったゾ) | May 2, 1997 |
| 227 | "Fish Ceremony" (Japanese: こいのぼりの修理だゾ) | May 2, 1997 |
Hiroshi, Shin-chan and Ko-chan play a game on Children’s Day. Ko-chan teaches a man and his dog a lesson for ill-treating others. / Shin-chan spoils Nene-chan’s mood at the tea ceremony. But, he enjoys a delicious ice cream made out of the tea with his friends. / Shin-chan and his friends tear the paper fish crafted for the fish ceremony. They fix the problem, but the fish opens up in the air.
| 228 | "Late for the bus again (Mom Faces Trouble)" (Japanese: きょうもバスに乗りおくれたゾ) | May 9, 1997 |
| 228 | "We're All Late" (Japanese: なかなかお出かけできないゾ) | May 9, 1997 |
| 228 | "Himawari Pesters Mom" (Japanese: 母ちゃんの苦労はたえないゾ) | May 9, 1997 |
Misae takes Shin-chan to school on her cycle. After facing challenges and reaching, she realises that Shin-chan has a half day at school. / The Nohara family wakes up late in the morning. Misae tries hard to get Shin-chan on the bus. But yet, Shin-chan misses the bus. / Himawari hides Misae’s necklace in the toilet and troubles her during the day. Shin-chan returns home and flushes the necklace.
| 229 | "Dad's Workout Plan" (Japanese: 父ちゃんのジョギングだゾ) | May 16, 1997 |
| 229 | "Kazama Loves Cleaning" (Japanese: セイケツ好きの風間くんだゾ) | May 16, 1997 |
| 229 | "A Visit to Yoshi" (Japanese: 有名マンガ家のタントーだゾ) | May 16, 1997 |
Hiroshi begins jogging to reduce his weight. He decides a 10 km target and manages to reach it. But he returns home in a taxi. / Kazama gets obsessed with cleaning. But as he feels hungry, he hesitantly eats a rice cake from Shin-chan’s hands. / Masao and Shin-chan visit Yoshi’s house to show him Masao’s story. But they end up showing it to a publisher, who appreciates it.
| 230 | "I Want a Kuntam Robo" (Japanese: ひまわりと一緒にお買物だゾ) | May 23, 1997 |
| 230 | "Being with Himawari is tiring (Himawari is Troublesome)" (Japanese: ひまわりの相手はつかれるゾ) | May 23, 1997 |
| 230 | "A Ruckus at the Hotel" (Japanese: ファミリーレストランに行くゾ) | May 23, 1997 |
Shin-chan pleads Misae and praises her to get him a Kuntam Robo space game. But Misae clearly denies him the game. / Shin-chan gets angry on Himawari as Misae scolds him for her mistakes. Hiroshi makes Shin-chan happy by bringing a Kuntam Robo space toy. / Himawari raises a ruckus at the hotel. Shin-chan moves on to a different table and relishes his meal. But Hiroshi and Misae remain hungry.
| 231 | "Dad Prepares a House Model" (Japanese: 父ちゃんのフロク作りだゾ) | May 30, 1997 |
| 231 | "Kazama is Embarrassed" (Japanese: 風間君はオラを信じてるゾ) | May 30, 1997 |
| 231 | "I can sell anything (Selling Pet Care Products)" (Japanese: 実演販売はオラにおまかせだゾ) | May 30, 1997 |
Hiroshi builds a house model for Shin-chan’s school project with great difficulty. But Himawari breaks the model. / Shin-chan drinks a can of juice at a store but forgets to carry money along. He keeps Kazama waiting and returns with an Action Mask book. / Shin-chan turns into a sales executive at a departmental store. He advertises pet care products and manages to sell them.
| 232 | "Himawari is a Menace" (Japanese: ひまわりの一人遊びだゾ) | June 6, 1997 |
| 232 | "Masao's Tragedies" (Japanese: マサオくんの悩みはつきないゾ) | June 6, 1997 |
| 232 | "Mom Learns to Use a Computer" (Japanese: 母ちゃんがパソコンを始めたゾ) | June 6, 1997 |
Himawari messes the whole house while Misae sleeps. Shin-chan returns from school and gets scolding for the mess. / Masao forgets his umbrella on a rainy day. Shin-chan offers Kazama’s umbrella to Masao and leaves Kazama stranded at school. / Misae learns to use a computer. She takes Hiroshi’s help in it but fails to remember the keys. But, Shin-chan and Himawari learn to use the computer.
| 233 | "Playing with an Electric Massager" (Japanese: 電気マッサージ機で遊ぶゾ) | June 13, 1997 |
| 233 | "Will Yoshinaga be Lucky?" (Japanese: よしなが先生の恋の破局?だゾ) | June 13, 1997 |
| 233 | "Yoshinaga and Ishizaka's Love Proposal" (Japanese: 落ちこんだよしなが先生だゾ) | June 13, 1997 |
Shin-chan plays with an electric massager. He turns the machine on under the food table and drops the food on the ground. / Yoshinaga meets Ishizaka and expects him to express his feelings. However, Ishizaka fails to speak his intentions due to Shin-chan. / Matsuzaka helps Yoshinaga and Ishizaka unite. Ishizaka expresses his feelings to Yoshinaga while playing a game at school.
| 234 | "Red Riding Hood and Purple Riding Hood" (Japanese: 赤ズキンと紫ズキンだゾ) | June 20, 1997 |
| 234 | "Baseball Practice" (Japanese: 草野球のトックンだゾ) | June 20, 1997 |
| 234 | "Baseball Match" (Japanese: プリティーギャルと草野球だゾ) | June 20, 1997 |
Nene-chan and Shin-chan enact red riding hood and the purple riding hood. Bo-chan, Masao, Kazama and Okita Soji chase Shin-chan for a secret letter. / Hiroshi trains himself for a baseball match. Shin-chan also takes training. Misae and Shin-chan visit the stadium to watch Hiroshi play. / Hiroshi and his team play a baseball match against a women’s team. Misae joins Hiroshi's team and wins the match.
| 235 | "Shiro, the Real Hero" (Japanese: シロもひまわりを見守ってるゾ) | June 27, 1997 |
| 235 | "Even on Rainy Days I Play Outside" (Japanese: 雨の日でもお外で遊ぶゾ) | June 27, 1997 |
| 235 | "Matsuzaka Gets Fooled" (Japanese: まつざか先生とひょーきんおじいさんだゾ) | June 27, 1997 |
Himawari notices Misae’s lipstick and chases it. Shiro saves Himawari from the tiny accidents in the house and turns to be the real hero. / Shin-chan and his friends go in search of snails. Shin-chan offers Kazama an insect to make him happy, but not a snail. / An old man lies to Matsuzaka of having a grandson, in order to spend time with her. Matsuzaka gets fooled by the old man.
| 236 | "I will take care of Himawari" (Japanese: ひまわりとお留守番で疲れたゾ) | July 4, 1997 |
| 236 | "Yoshinaga-sensei is practicing newlywed life" (Japanese: よしなが先生新婚生活の練習だゾ) | July 4, 1997 |
| 236 | "Who is Following Nanako?" (Japanese: ストーカーは許さないゾ) | July 4, 1997 |
Misae hands over Himawari’s responsibility to Shin-chan and goes out. Shin-chan gets tired of Himawari’s mischief and falls asleep. Misae returns home and finds Himawari taking care of Shin-chan. / ?? / A man follows Nanako. Hiroshi, Shin-chan and Nanako’s ninja friend, Shinobu catch hold of the man who turns out to be Nanako’s father.
| 237 | "The Grandpas Have Changed" (Japanese: 人が変わったじいちゃん達だゾ) | July 11, 1997 |
| 237 | "Honeybees in the School" (Japanese: 組長先生のハチの巣とりだゾ) | July 11, 1997 |
| 237 | "Blowing Balloons for Himawari is a Task" (Japanese: ひまわりの風船遊びだゾ) | July 11, 1997 |
?? / Matsuzaka wears an expensive French perfume to show off in school. However, the honeybees get attracted towards her. Shin-chan gives the expensive perfume to the principal assuming it to be an insect repellent. / Misae goes out of breath in blowing a packet of balloons on Himawari's insistence. To add to Misae’s plight, a doctor offers Himawari more balloons as a gift.
| 238 | "Where is Himawari?" (Japanese: ひまわりがどこにもいないゾ) | July 18, 1997 |
| 238 | "Take out the inflatable pool!" (Japanese: ビニールプールを出すゾ) | July 18, 1997 |
| 238 | "Greedy for Crabs" (Japanese: カニを食べると無口になるゾ) | July 18, 1997 |
Himawari hides in an empty bag. While Hiroshi and Shin-chan search for Himawari downstairs, Shiro takes her upstairs in the room. / Misae requests Shin-chan to let her sleep. But Shin-chan invites his friends to take a dip in the plastic pool, leading to a commotion. / Hiroshi, Misae and Shin-chan get greedy for the crabs sent by Kawaguchi. Shin-chan wins a game and relishes a chunk of crab meat.
| 239 | "Is mom fooling around?" (Japanese: 母ちゃんがフリンした?ゾ) | July 25, 1997 |
| 239 | "Spending a Holiday With the Principal" (Japanese: 幼稚園で水まきだゾ) | July 25, 1997 |
| 239 | "Mosquitoes bug me at night (Mosquitoes, You Can't Escape)" (Japanese: 夜中の蚊にはなやまされるゾ) | July 25, 1997 |
?? / Shin-chan, Masao, Bo-chan and Kazama spend time with the principal during their holidays. They enjoy ice cream and have fun on a rainy day. / Shin-chan gets annoyed with the mosquitoes. He opens the door in order to chase them out, but a swarm of mosquitoes enter the house and disturbs the family’s sleep.
| 240 | "We're Looking for Stack Beetles" (Japanese: オオクワガタを採りに行くゾ) | August 1, 1997 |
| 240 | "A yo-yo fishing for the Red Scorpion Corps" (Japanese: 紅さそり隊のヨーヨー釣りだゾ) | August 1, 1997 |
| 240 | "Himawari Takes a Dip in the Pool" (Japanese: ひまわりの行水だゾ) | August 1, 1997 |
Hiroshi, Misae and Shin-chan get on a mission to find stack beetles for a reward. They set a trap for it. But on not finding any, they give up and start admiring butterflies. / ?? / Misae blows air into the plastic pool for Shin-chan and Himawari. Shin-chan tears the plastic of the pool with his toy and dirties the house while fixing the damage.
| 241 | "The French Cursed Doll" (Japanese: クレヨンホラー劇場・呪いのフランス人形だゾ) | August 8, 1997 |
| 241 | "Is it a School or a Haunted House?" (Japanese: クレヨンホラー劇場・恐怖の幼稚園だゾ) | August 8, 1997 |
| 241 | "We Will Visit a Haunted House" (Japanese: クレヨンホラー劇場・ユーレイにさそわれちゃったゾ) | August 8, 1997 |
Hiroshi brings home a doll as a gift for Himawari. The cursed doll possesses Shin-chan's toys and attacks Misae and Shin-chan for treating them badly. Misae wakes up, and it all appears to have been a nightmare. / Kazama and his friends return to school after their holidays. Kazama encounters evil incidents and gets petrified by Matsuzaka. He wakes up and realises that it was a nightmare. / In the ancient era, Kazama helps Nene-chan and her mother. Shin-chan invites himself for dinner at Nene-chan’s place and relishes a king’s meal. Kazama hesitates to join Nene-chan’s mother considering her to be an evil.
| 242 | "Standing in a Queue for the Train Tickets" (Japanese: 切符を買うのも行列だゾ) | August 15, 1997 |
| 242 | "Travelling on a Crowded Train" (Japanese: 満員こまちで秋田へ行くゾ) | August 15, 1997 |
| 242 | "We Will Have Fun at Grandpa's Place" (Japanese: じいちゃんの家で遊ぶゾ) | August 15, 1997 |
Hiroshi and Shin-chan stand in a long queue to book a reserved ticket. On reaching the counter, the tickets get full. / Misae, Shin-chan, Hiroshi and Himawari travel in a crowded train. And despite having reserved seats, they do not make use of them. / Shin-chan’s grandfather welcomes his family home. The Nohara family visit a place located in the middle of the fields and have fun together.
| 243 | "I Will Draw a Map" (Japanese: オラの作った宝の地図だゾ) | August 22, 1997 |
| 243 | "A repayment of the Kasukabe Defense Force" (Japanese: かすかべ防衛隊の恩返しだゾ) | August 22, 1997 |
| 243 | "A New AC in Our House" (Japanese: オラの家にクーラーが付いたゾ) | August 22, 1997 |
Shin-chan hides his toys and the household things in different places of the house. He draws a map to know about its whereabouts. Misae leaves the car key on the table and searches for it in the whole house. / ?? / As it gets too hot, Misae buys an AC from Hiroshi’s pocket money and fits it in the bedroom. But as the TV is in the living room, Hiroshi makes an adjustment to watch his baseball match.
| 244 | "What is the Mystery Behind an Egg?" (Japanese: にわとりを拾って大さわぎだゾ) | August 29, 1997 |
| 244 | "Taking Care of the Principal" (Japanese: 園長先生を看病するゾ) | August 29, 1997 |
| 244 | "Dad and I Will Clean the Garden" (Japanese: 父ちゃんと庭の草むしりだゾ) | August 29, 1997 |
Shin-chan brings a hen home for the love of eggs and names it Sharon. The hen lays an egg and returns to the place she belongs. / Shin-chan and his friends treat the principal and help him recover from his sickness. The principal cooks food for the children. / Shin-chan and Hiroshi take up the task of cleaning the lawn in exchange for ice cream and juice. The father and son have fun while they work.
| 245 | "A Battle of the Cowboys" (Japanese: 埼玉でウエスタンだゾ) | September 5, 1997 |
| 245 | "Mom's Fat Test (Mom Will Burn Her Fat)" (Japanese: 母ちゃんの体脂肪率だゾ) | September 5, 1997 |
| 245 | "I Got the Onions Effortlessly" (Japanese: 帰ってきた子供ガンマンだゾ) | September 5, 1997 |
| 246 | "I Invited Trouble" (Japanese: シップ薬はキョーレツだゾ) | September 12, 1997 |
| 246 | "Mom Takes a Leave From the Housework" (Japanese: 一人になりたい母ちゃんだゾ) | September 12, 1997 |
| 246 | "Providing the Tofu With Security" (Japanese: おトーフはこわさないゾ) | September 12, 1997 |
Shin-chan puts the pain relief tapes on his whole body. He feels the urge to use the washroom, but the tapes make it difficult for him. / Misae goes out to relieve her stress. She returns home and finds the mess created by Hiroshi and the children. / Shin-chan goes far away to purchase tofu. He carefully brings the tofu home. But he flips the tofu on Misae while saving it from Himawari.
| 247 | "Micchi and Yoshirin Meet at the Amusement Park" (Japanese: ミッチーとヨシリンだゾ) | September 19, 1997 |
| 247 | "I Will Modify Yoshi's Comic" (Japanese: 有名マンガ家の原稿を拾ったゾ) | September 19, 1997 |
| 247 | "Himawari at the Missing Centre" (Japanese: デパートでひまわりの面倒を見るゾ) | September 19, 1997 |
Hiroshi and his family visit an amusement park. They meet Micchi and Yoshirin, a couple, who asks Hiroshi to click photographs. / Shin-chan modifies Yoshi’s comic assignment. Yoshi gets shocked when he sees the comic, as Shin-chan spoils it. / Misae hands over Himawari’s responsibility to Shin-chan. Himawari gets attracted to a customer service executive and goes with him to the missing department.
| 248 | "Dad is Not Scared of a Typhoon" (Japanese: 台風の中でも出勤だゾ) | September 26, 1997 |
| 248 | "I Will Answer the Questions" (Japanese: アンケートにご協力するゾ) | September 26, 1997 |
| 248 | "We have New Neighbours" (Japanese: ミッチーとヨシリンが来たゾ) | September 26, 1997 |
As the train lines get blocked due to a typhoon, Misae drives to a far-off station to help Hiroshi reach his office. / A marketing research analyst questions Shin-chan about frozen foods. Shin-chan gives appropriate answers and leaves Himawari with him. / Micchi and Yoshirin book an apartment next to the Nohara family. Hiroshi tries to scare the young couple with stories, but it doesn’t affect them.
| SPECIAL–17 | "Crayon Wars" (Japanese: クレヨンウォーズ) | October 10, 1997 |
| SPECIAL–17 | "The location corps of the TV drama came" (Japanese: テレビドラマのロケ隊が来たゾ) | October 10, 1997 |
| SPECIAL–17 | "Will Puffy come out? It’s Princess Kaguya of Himawari" (Japanese: パフィーも出るゾ！ひまわりのかぐや姫だゾ) | October 10, 1997 |
| SPECIAL–17 | "I found a shiraga in my mother" (Japanese: 母ちゃんにシラガ発見だゾ) | October 10, 1997 |
| SPECIAL–17 | "Crayon Wars 2" (Japanese: クレヨンウォーズ2) | October 10, 1997 |
| SPECIAL–17 | "Micchi and Yoshirin is moving" (Japanese: ミッチーヨシリンの引越しだゾ) | October 10, 1997 |
| SPECIAL–17 | "A relay of friendship" (Japanese: 友情のリレーだゾ) | October 10, 1997 |
| SPECIAL–17 | "Crayon Wars 3" (Japanese: クレヨンウォーズ3) | October 10, 1997 |
Star Wars parody, part one / ?? / Himawari is Princess Thumbeline and, if they want to marry her, her suitors must bring one of the jewels of the terrible White Snake. / Shin-chan finds a gray hair on Misae’s head and she becomes upset. / Star Wars parody, part two / One Sunday morning, a removal truck fills the Nohara’s garden with boxes. They belong to Micchi and Yoshirin, who have just moved to their street. / ?? / Star Wars parody, part three
| 249 | "I Invited Trouble by Helping" (Japanese: 遠足のおやつを買うゾ) | October 17, 1997 |
| 249 | "Enjoying at a Picnic" (Japanese: きょうは楽しい遠足だゾ) | October 17, 1997 |
| 249 | "No One Can Find Me" (Japanese: 遠足でまたまた迷子になったゾ) | October 17, 1997 |
Shin-chan and Masao take money from their mothers to buy snacks for a picnic. Shin-chan helps Masao with some money. / The school takes the children for a picnic. Shin-chan leaves the principal’s hand and gets on his own, away from his school members. / While everyone at the picnic spot gets worried for Shin-chan and assume he has drowned, Shin-chan enjoys a boat ride with the tourist.
| 250 | "Micchi and Yoshirin Fight" (Japanese: ミッチーヨシリンのケンカだゾ) | October 24, 1997 |
| 250 | "Relaxin' While Home Alone" (Japanese: ひとりでのんびりお留守番だゾ) | October 24, 1997 |
| 250 | "Even Hallway Life is Comfortable" (Japanese: 玄関ぐらしも快適だゾ) | October 24, 1997 |
Micchi and Yoshirin, a young couple, have an argument. On seeing Misae and Hiroshi have a heated argument, Micchi and Yoshirin reconcile. / Shin-chan stays home alone. He builds an Action Mask territory with the wooden blocks. But the blocks fall and he gets a scolding from Misae. / As Himawari gets sleep only in the corridor, the whole family shifts their things into the corridor.
| 251 | "Himawari Gets Drunk" (Japanese: 酔っぱらった?ひまわりだゾ) | October 31, 1997 |
| 251 | "The Three-Eyed Dog" (Japanese: キョーフの三つ目犬だゾ) | October 31, 1997 |
| 251 | "Dad Fights Sleep" (Japanese: ネムケと戦う父ちゃんだゾ) | October 31, 1997 |
Himawari sees a shining can of juice in the fridge and gets attracted to it. She scatters the food all over and walks up to the fridge. / The Kasukabe Defence Force enters the forest in search of the three-eyed dog. They find Shiro with the third eye that was drawn by Shin-chan. / Hiroshi stays awake whole night to make it in time for a meeting. But at the time of leaving to work, he falls asleep.
| 252 | "A present for Miss Nanako (I'll Make a Gift for Nanako)" (Japanese: おねいさんにプレゼントだゾ) | November 7, 1997 |
| 252 | "Miss Yoshinaga's model room (Is Yoshinaga Mam Purchasing an Apartment)" (Japanese: よしなが先生とモデルルームだゾ) | November 7, 1997 |
| 252 | "Playing with a flashlight (We Will Play With a Torch)" (Japanese: かいちゅう電灯で遊ぶゾ) | November 7, 1997 |
Nanako invites Shin-chan to a party. Shin-chan stays awake the whole night and makes a gift for Nanako out of clay. / Yoshinaga and Ishizaka take a tour of the sample apartment before buying a new one. The Kasukabe Defence Force suggests about the décor. / Shin-chan plays games with the new torch. He scares Micchi and Yoshirin and gathers people in the middle of the night with the siren.
| 253 | "I can make curry (I'm an Expert at Curries!)" (Japanese: オラだってカレーを作れるゾ) | November 14, 1997 |
| 253 | "Heroine of justice: Nene!" (Japanese: 正義のヒロインネネちゃんだゾ) | November 14, 1997 |
| 253 | "Locked inside the car (Himawari is Locked in the Car)" (Japanese: 車のドアをロックしちゃったゾ) | November 14, 1997 |
Shin-chan prepares meatball curry by himself. In an attempt to make it taste good, he adds many ingredients and spoils it completely. / Nene-chan appreciates Mimiko’s bravery and enacts her while playing the Action Mask game. Nene-chan’s friends support her. / Himawari remains in the car and locks the door of it. Misae calls a mechanic and opens it, but Himawari locks it again.
| 254 | "Himawari is a model (Himawari's Photo Shoot)" (Japanese: ひまわりがモデルになるゾ) | November 21, 1997 |
| 254 | "Digging up buried treasure (We Are Young Adventurers)" (Japanese: まいぞう金を掘り当てるゾ) | November 21, 1997 |
| 254 | "Mom's hidden past! (I Will Find Mom's Friend)" (Japanese: 母ちゃんのかくされた過去だゾ) | November 21, 1997 |
The editors of a magazine click Himawari’s pictures. Misae pretends to be rich. But Shin-chan drops ink on her dress. / Shin-chan and his friends use Ryuko’s map to find treasure. They find Ryuko’s diary in a box and a piggy bank hidden underground. / Shin-chan takes help from a postman and finds Misae’s pen friend. He gets amazed by Misae’s letters to her friend.
| 255 | "A little bonus goes a long way (We Will Eat Blowfish)" (Japanese: ボーナスで少しゼイタクするゾ) | November 28, 1997 |
| 255 | "My first fugu (Everyone Wants Blowfish)" (Japanese: 初めてフグを食べちゃうゾ) | November 28, 1997 |
| 255 | "The wandering dragon!" (Japanese: さすらいのドラゴンと対決だゾ) | November 28, 1997 |
Hiroshi gets a bonus and decides to spend it at a restaurant, to eat blowfish with his family. However, Hiroshi and Misae's waste time looking for each other. / Hiroshi and his family visit an expensive restaurant to eat blowfish. As the blowfish turns out to be tasty, everyone pounces on it and relish their meal. / ??
| 256 | "Mom takes out the garbage (Mom and I Will Collect Garbage)" (Japanese: 母ちゃんのゴミ当番だゾ) | December 5, 1997 |
| 256 | "Let's play pretend sword fight! (We are Young Samurais)" (Japanese: ちゃんばらごっこをするゾ) | December 5, 1997 |
| 256 | "Three's a crowd in a tub!" (Japanese: 三人でお風呂は騒々しいゾ) | December 5, 1997 |
Misae and Micchi collect the dry garbage and segregate it to be recycled. Shin-chan segregates the cola drink cans and the lemon drink cans. / On a cold day, Hiroshi encourages the children to play the sword fighting game outside the house. He joins the children and teaches them the game. / ??
| 257 | "My date with Miss Nanako!" (Japanese: おねいさんとデートだゾ) | December 12, 1997 |
| 257 | "Escorting Miss Nanako!" (Japanese: おねいさんをエスコートするゾ) | December 12, 1997 |
| 257 | "Flying Paper Airplanes! (We Will Fly Planes)" (Japanese: 紙飛行機を飛ばすゾ) | December 12, 1997 |
?? / ?? / Shin-chan and his friends fly their planes on an open ground. Bo-chan’s rubber band plane goes up in the sky. A young boy threatens Shin-chan and his friends to leave the place and also breaks Bo-chan’s plane with his Cobra helicopter. Shin-chan shoots his paper plane at the helicopter and crashes the helicopter. After that, the young boy repent on his behaviour and Shin-chan and his friends vow to make new planes.
| 258 | "Dad Needs Money Badly" (Japanese: 宅配便のお金がないゾ) | December 19, 1997 |
| 258 | "I Will Keep the House Tidy" (Japanese: オラはソージ機の達人だゾ) | December 19, 1997 |
| 258 | "Miss Matsuzaka is Not Alone on Christmas" (Japanese: まつざか先生のデートは近いゾ) | December 19, 1997 |
Hiroshi receives a courier containing his golf kit. He requests Misae to pay for it, but Misae spends the money on shopping. / Misae bribes Shin-chan to do the cleaning for a reward. Shin-chan begins cleaning but ends up messing the house. / Matsuzaka meets a boy and decides to celebrate Christmas happily. Shin-chan and his friends follow Matsuzaka to know about the boy and chase the boy away.
| SPECIAL–18 | "A trip to Hawaii with the whole family Chapter 1 Big hit" (Japanese: 家族みんなでハワイ旅行だゾ 第一章 大当たり) | December 26, 1997 |
| SPECIAL–18 | "A trip to Hawaii with the whole family Chapter 2 Departure" (Japanese: 家族みんなでハワイ旅行だゾ 第二章 出発) | December 26, 1997 |
| SPECIAL–18 | "A trip to Hawaii with the whole family" (Japanese: 家族みんなでハワイ旅行だゾ 第三章 巡り合い) | December 26, 1997 |
| SPECIAL–18 | "A trip to Hawaii with the whole family Chapter 4 Hula Dance" (Japanese: 家族みんなでハワイ旅行だゾ 第四章 フラダンス) | December 26, 1997 |
| SPECIAL–18 | "A trip to Hawaii with the whole family Chapter 5 Love" (Japanese: 家族みんなでハワイ旅行だゾ 第五章 恋心) | December 26, 1997 |
| SPECIAL–18 | "A trip to Hawaii with the whole family Chapter 6 Sa-yo-na-ra" (Japanese: 家族みんなでハワイ旅行だゾ 第六章 さ・よ・な・ら) | December 26, 1997 |
The Noharas win a trip to Hawaii in a lottery at a department store. / The Noharas fly with Micchi and Yoshirin, and give the security and flight attendants a hard time. / While Hiroshi, Misae and Himawari enjoy themselves at the beach, Shin-chan finds the mermaid he was looking for. / ?? / ?? / ??

== 1998 ==
| No. | Title | Original release date |
|---|---|---|
| 259 | "Mom bought a sewing machine! (Mom Will Do the Stitching)" (Japanese: 母ちゃんがミシンを買ったゾ) | January 9, 1998 |
| 259 | "The Kasukabe Scorpions and their loose socks! (A Battle Between Two Groups)" (Japanese: 紅さそり隊VSルーズソックス隊だゾ) | January 9, 1998 |
| 259 | "A baby boy or a baby girl? (Will it be a Boy or a Girl?)" (Japanese: 赤ちゃんは男か女かで大モメだゾ) | January 9, 1998 |
| 260 | "Himawari's dream and reality! (Himawari's Dream Comes True)" (Japanese: ひまわりの夢と現実だゾ) | January 16, 1998 |
| 260 | "Young ninja's challenge! (A Fight of the Ninjas)" (Japanese: 少年忍者からのはたし状だゾ) | January 16, 1998 |
| 260 | "Dad wants to be the company president (Dad Wants to Change His Jo)" (Japanese: 社長になりたい父ちゃんだゾ) | January 16, 1998 |
Himawari sees a dream of a catalogue of jewels. She wakes up and gets furious at Shin-chan for playing with the catalogue. / Nene-chan and her friends play against the Saitama Ninja Trio. Kazama and Masao remain tied to the rope even after the game. / Hiroshi takes a decision of quitting his job. Misae and Shin-chan bring juice for Hiroshi to change his mind. But, Misae gets drunk.
| 261 | "Running errands is a pain! (My Memory is Weak)" (Japanese: オラのおつかいは大メーワクだゾ) | January 23, 1998 |
| 261 | "Micchi and Yoshi at the bookstore! (Micchi and Yoshirin at a Bookstore)" (Japanese: ミッチーヨシリンと本屋さんだゾ) | January 23, 1998 |
| 261 | "Even when I'm sick, I want my snacks! (I Will Eat Doughnuts Despite the Fever)" (Japanese: お風邪をひいてもおつやは欲しいゾ) | January 23, 1998 |
A man drops his wallet on the road. Shin-chan picks the wallet but forgets to deposit it at the police station. And the man loses on his promotion. / The owner of the bookstall and Nakamura make plans to chase Yoshirin and Micchi out of the bookstall. But their efforts fail. / Shin-chan gets a fever but refuses to go home for the sake of doughnuts, which turn out to be clay.
| 262 | "A Haircut for Me and Himawari" (Japanese: ひまわりの髪を切るゾ) | January 30, 1998 |
| 262 | "We're Going to a Recycle Store" (Japanese: リサイクルショップに行くゾ) | January 30, 1998 |
| 262 | "Party at the Nohara Home" (Japanese: 野原家のパーティーを開くゾ) | January 30, 1998 |
Misae uses tricks to cut Himawari’s hair, including cutting Shin-chan’s hair. But, Himawari gets her hair cut only from a handsome hair stylist. / Misae sells her clothes at the recycle store using Shin-chan and her marketing skills. She uses the money to buy more things. / Misae organises a home party. As Misae gets angry at Hiroshi and leaves, Hiroshi prepares oden with Shin-chan’s help.
| 263 | "We Will Eat an Expensive Meat" (Japanese: 今夜のおかずは高級ステーキだゾ) | February 6, 1998 |
| 263 | "A Rabbit in the School" (Japanese: ウサギが幼稚園に来たゾ) | February 6, 1998 |
| 263 | "Looking for Himawari" (Japanese: ひまわりを追跡するゾ) | February 6, 1998 |
Himawari plays with an expensive meat and spoils it. So, Misae prepares the cheapest meat available to keep Shin-chan and Hiroshi happy. / Ryuko leaves her rabbit in Shin-chan’s school. But, the rabbit refuses to stay without Ryuko and returns to her. / Himawari gets attracted to a man because of his gold chain and enters his car. Shiro, Shin-chan and the principal help bring Himawari back home.
| 264 | "Himawari like bags" (Japanese: ひまわりはカバンがお好きだゾ) | February 13, 1998 |
| 264 | "There are lots of vegetables" (Japanese: 野菜がいっぱいだゾ) | February 13, 1998 |
| 264 | "Farewell Micchi and Yoshirin" (Japanese: 別れ別れのミッチーヨシリンだゾ) | February 13, 1998 |
| 265 | "Selling an Insurance is Difficult" (Japanese: 保険のセールスも大変だゾ) | February 20, 1998 |
| 265 | "Playing Trump Cards at Nene-chan's Place" (Japanese: きょうはネネちゃんが主役だゾ) | February 20, 1998 |
| 265 | "Building an Ice House" (Japanese: お庭にカマクラをつくるゾ) | February 20, 1998 |
Misae guides a lady in selling insurance policies. The lady offers an insurance policy to Hiroshi and convinces him to buy it. / Shin-chan and his friends play the trump card game at Nene-chan’s house. Nene-chan loses all the matches. / Hiroshi and Shin-chan build an ice house on a snowy day. Micchi and Yoshirin spend their time in the ice house, which melts in the night.
| 266 | "Look! We're Girls! (Me and My Friends Wear Himawari's Clothes)" (Japanese: オラたち女の子だゾ) | March 6, 1998 |
| 266 | "Shiro Eats a Cake" (Japanese: シロはおなかがペコペコだゾ) | March 6, 1998 |
| 266 | "Dad Plays a Contest on TV" (Japanese: 父ちゃんの宝さがしだゾ) | March 6, 1998 |
Shin-chan, Kazama, Bo-chan and Masao wear Himawari’s new clothes and visit the supermarket. Misae gets shocked to see them. / Shin-chan forgets to feed Shiro his food. As Shiro feels hungry, he eats the cake that was gifted by Micchi and Yoshirin. / Hiroshi decides to participate in a contest for a reward of 1 million. He searches for his old sweatsuit but finds it turned into a tablecloth.
| 267 | "Mommy's Gone! (Mom and Himawari Have Left the House)" (Japanese: 母ちゃんが出ていったゾ) | March 13, 1998 |
| 267 | "Making a Second Secret Defence Base" (Japanese: 防衛隊第二のひみつ基地だゾ) | March 13, 1998 |
| 267 | "Playing Hide-and-seek with Miss Matsuzaka" (Japanese: まつざか先生はお金がないゾ) | March 13, 1998 |
Misae leaves the house to attend her friend’s wedding. But the neighbour assumes that Misae has left the house forever. / The Kasukabe Defence Force creates a second secret base in the forest. As Nene-chan break the base in anger, they return to Yoshinaga's balcony. / Matsuzaka falls short of money. Hence, she plays the hide-and-seek game with Shin-chan to avoid paying Yoshinaga the meeting fees.
| 268 | "Become Himawari’s younger brother" (Japanese: オラ、ひまわりの弟になるゾ) | March 20, 1998 |
| 268 | "Shopping With Masao" (Japanese: マサオくんのお買い物だゾ) | March 20, 1998 |
| 268 | "I Will Play a New Game Today" (Japanese: オラと師匠の家出だゾ) | March 20, 1998 |
?? / Masao’s friends help Masao in purchasing groceries from the supermarket. At the time of the bill, Masao realises that he lost his wallet. But Masao’s mother returns Masao the wallet which was left at home. / Ryuko leaves her house in order to search a new one. Shin-chan teaches Ryuko a lesson about life while playing a game.
| 269 | "Dad Only Loves Himawari" (Japanese: 父ちゃんはひまわりが大好きだゾ) | April 10, 1998 |
| 269 | "We're Going on a Picnic" (Japanese: お花見でごキゲンだゾ) | April 10, 1998 |
| 269 | "Defence Force Rivals" (Japanese: 防衛隊のライバル登場だゾ) | April 10, 1998 |
Hiroshi expresses fatherly love towards Himawari. But Himawari refuses his love. Hiroshi feels happy when Himawari addresses him as daddy. / The Nohara family goes on a picnic. Hiroshi gets together with a few young ladies and gets a beating from Misae in return. / A new group of social workers named Kasukabe Guardian Force works for the welfare of Kasukabe. But they get scared of the principal and cry.
| SPECIAL–19 | "The 3 Little Pigs" (Japanese: オラたち三匹の子豚だゾ) | April 17, 1998 |
| SPECIAL–19 | "Youth Dad and Mom" (Japanese: 青春時代の父ちゃん母ちゃんだゾ) | April 17, 1998 |
Shinnosuke, Kazama and Buriburizaemon are three brother pigs who are always fighting one another, and their mother sends them away on a trip so they can learn to live on their own. The three little pigs continue their trip, in search for the pearl their mother has asked them to bring her.
| 270 | "My Grandfathers Pay a Surprise Visit Together" (Japanese: ごますりダブルじいちゃんだゾ) | April 24, 1998 |
| 270 | "Dad Has a New Cellphone" (Japanese: ケータイ電話はおもしろいゾ) | April 24, 1998 |
| 270 | "I Get Chocobi for My Efforts" (Japanese: 冬物のおかたづけだゾ) | April 24, 1998 |
Shin-chan’s grandfathers pay a surprise visit together. After they return home, Shin-chan’s grandmothers arrive. / Hiroshi gets a new cell phone. He feeds in important contact numbers. Shin-chan deletes the client’s number and feeds in Masao’s number. / Misae gives Hiroshi’s winter clothes for dry cleaning to avail the discounts and free gifts. Misae bribes Shin-chan with Chocobi for hiding it.
| 271 | "Today is Our Photoshoot" (Japanese: 写真館でコスプレだゾ) | May 1, 1998 |
| 271 | "Our Rivals' Kindergarten (Visiting a New School)" (Japanese: ライバル幼稚園に行くゾ) | May 1, 1998 |
| 271 | "Mommy's Got Hay Fever" (Japanese: 母ちゃんが花粉症になったゾ) | May 1, 1998 |
Misae, Shin-chan and Himawari photo shoot themselves at a discounted rate. Himawari sneezes in the photograph due to a cold. / Shin-chan and his friends visit the school that the Kasukabe Guardian Force attends. Kazama impresses the principal and shows interest in the school. / Misae assumes she has a pollen allergy and takes precautions. But the doctor confirms she has a cold.
| 272 | "Himawari the Copycat (Himawari Imitates Everyone)" (Japanese: まねっこひまわりだゾ) | May 8, 1998 |
| 272 | "Dad is Troubled by the Neighbours" (Japanese: ミッチーヨシリン出張騒動だゾ) | May 8, 1998 |
| 272 | "Finding the Lost Envelope" (Japanese: ヘソクリの場所がわからないゾ) | May 8, 1998 |
Himawari imitates Misae, Shin-chan and Hiroshi’s actions. Shin-chan and Himawari imitate Hiroshi even in sleep. / While Yoshirin goes on a business trip, Hiroshi takes Micchi’s responsibility. Micchi annoys Hiroshi with false alarms. / Misae searches for an envelope that contains her hidden money. As Hiroshi gets the envelope, Misae lies to Hiroshi that the money is for his new socks.
| 273 | "Stop Global Warming Like Us" (Japanese: ケチケチで温暖化防止だゾ) | May 15, 1998 |
| 273 | "I Will Make Kazama Babysit" (Japanese: 風間くんがひまわりをあやすゾ) | May 15, 1998 |
| 273 | "I Will Take Care of Nanako" (Japanese: ななこおねいさんを看病するゾ) | May 15, 1998 |
Misae saves electricity and fuel in order to avoid global warming and save some money. But, as it rains, she hires a taxi to travel back home. / Kazama babysits Himawari for a while. As he finds her cute, he requests his mother to bring him a sister like Himawari. / Nanako’s father and Shin-chan rush to meet Nanako as she has a cold. But they are shocked to see Shinobu there.
| 274 | "He is Miss Nanako’s Father" (Japanese: ななこおねいさんのお父さんだゾ) | May 22, 1998 |
| 274 | "A rival kindergarten child came to scout" (Japanese: ライバル園児が偵察に来たゾ) | May 22, 1998 |
| 274 | "Confronting rival kindergarten children" (Japanese: ライバル園児と対決するゾ) | May 22, 1998 |
| 275 | "Bandages Are Bliss (I Hurt Myself)" (Japanese: ホータイでしあわせ気分だゾ) | May 29, 1998 |
| 275 | "Mom's New Job Starts Today" (Japanese: 母ちゃんがパートに出るゾ) | May 29, 1998 |
| 275 | "Mom's New Job is Difficult" (Japanese: 母ちゃんのパートは大変だゾ) | May 29, 1998 |
Shin-chan cuts his finger while opening a food can for Shiro. he ties the bandage all over his body and scares Misae. / Misae decides to take up a new job to purchase an expensive dress. She convinces her family and keeps Himawari at a daycare centre. / Misae begins a new job at a store. However, the boss and the supervisor misbehave with Misae. She loses her patience and resigns from her job.
| 276 | "Jan Ken Po Shinnosuke Vesus Mommy (I Play Stone-Paper-Scissors With Mom)" (Japanese: 母ちゃんとジャンケン勝負だゾ) | June 5, 1998 |
| 276 | "Taking an Insurance is a Good Habit" (Japanese: 幼稚園で保険のセールスだゾ) | June 5, 1998 |
| 276 | "Keeping Daddy Healthy" (Japanese: 父ちゃんの病気予防だゾ) | June 5, 1998 |
Shin-chan and Misae play the stone-paper-scissors game. While Misae plays smart to win, Shin-chan’s luck helps him win a round. / Jinko fails in convincing the school staff in taking an insurance policy. But Matsuzaka and Jinko’s school connection helps her sell a policy. / While Hiroshi goes vegetarian after being diagnosed with diabetes, Shin-chan and Misae relish a box of meat.
| 277 | "A New Baby at Nene-chan's House" (Japanese: ネネちゃんのママが妊娠したゾ) | June 12, 1998 |
| 277 | "Cupid Calls on Miss Matsuzaka (Miss Matsuzaka and I have been Hurt)" (Japanese: まつざか先生に春の予感だゾ) | June 12, 1998 |
| 277 | "Miss Matsuzaka is Hurt, Once Again" (Japanese: ひとめぼれしたまつざか先生だゾ) | June 12, 1998 |
Misae assumes Nene-chan’s mother is expecting a baby. But Nene-chan’s mother discloses the truth that she has put on weight and is not pregnant. / Matsuzaka has a terrible fall. She visits Dr Tokurou and develops a crush on him. But Shin-chan also reaches there to treat his sprain. / Dr Tokurou personally returns Matsuzaka her medical card. In excitement, Matsuzaka misses her step and falls again.
| 278 | "Miss Matsuzaka's Joyful Hospital Stay (Miss Matsuzaka is Admitted in the Hospital)" (Japanese: まつざか先生の明るい入院だゾ) | June 19, 1998 |
| 278 | "The Kasukabe Defence Training Comes Useful" (Japanese: ひまわりを救出するゾ) | June 19, 1998 |
| 278 | "Miss Matsuzaka and I Are Admitted in the Hospital" (Japanese: まつざか先生と一緒に入院だゾ) | June 19, 1998 |
Yoshinaga and the school principal visit Matsuzaka in the hospital. Matsuzaka gets angry on her sisters as they flirt with Dr Tokurou. / Shin-chan suffers a bone fracture while saving Himawari. Coincidentally, he gets admitted in the same hospital room as that of Matsuzaka. / Matsuzaka requests Shin-chan to spy on Dr Tokurou. She gets angry with Shin-chan’s findings of the doctor.
| 279 | "Miss Matsuzaka and the Doctor are Now Friends" (Japanese: 恋にゆれるまつざか先生だゾ) | June 26, 1998 |
| 279 | "I Ran From the Hospital" (Japanese: 病院をぬけだすゾ) | June 26, 1998 |
| 279 | "One More Day at the Hospital" (Japanese: 病院でお昼寝だゾ) | June 26, 1998 |
Matsuzaka gets a suspicion that Dr Tokurou is interested in men. Dr Tokurou proves Matsuzaka’s suspicion wrong. / Shin-chan gets angry as Nanako doesn’t meet him. So, he escapes from the hospital. He visits his school and returns to the hospital. / Misae leaves Himawari with Matsuzaka and goes shopping. Himawari mischievously roams the hospital and leaves the doctor and the nurse worried.
| 280 | "I'm Discharged from the Hospital" (Japanese: 久しぶりの我が家はいいゾ) | July 3, 1998 |
| 280 | "I'm Trying to Walk" (Japanese: オラはリハビリ中だゾ) | July 3, 1998 |
| 280 | "My Leg Still Hurts" (Japanese: まだまだギブスは取りたくないゾ) | July 3, 1998 |
Shin-chan gets discharged from the hospital and returns home with Misae. He troubles Misae for all his work. / Misae forces Shin-chan to practice walking. Himawari removes the plaster and makes Shin-chan realise that he can walk. But he hides it from Misae. / Misae gets a doubt that Shin-chan is lying about the pain in his leg. So, Misae plays a trick and discloses Shin-chan’s lie.
| 281 | "Shin-chan Rejoins School" (Japanese: 久しぶりの幼稚園だゾ) | July 10, 1998 |
| 281 | "The New Teacher Acts Weird (Miss Masumi Shows Her Different Side)" (Japanese: 新しい先生は変わっているゾ) | July 10, 1998 |
| 281 | "What is in the Gift Box?" (Japanese: お中元が届いたゾ) | July 10, 1998 |
Shin-chan rejoins school and expresses happiness. Masumi joins as a substitute to Matsuzaka and gets nervous when she sees children. / Masumi hesitates to interact with the children and displays nervousness. But she drops her spectacles and displays rage. / Misae, Shin-chan and Himawari get upset when they do not get their desired gift. But gift vouchers make them happy.
| SPECIAL–20 | "Buriburizaemon’s Adventure (Thunder) (1994) <R>" (Japanese: ぶりぶりざえもんの冒険（雷鳴編）（1994年）〈再〉) | July 12, 1998 |
| SPECIAL–20 | "The Adventures of Buriburizaemon: The Storm Chapter (1994) <R>" (Japanese: ぶりぶりざえもんの冒険（風雲編）（1994年）〈再〉) | July 12, 1998 |
| SPECIAL–20 | "Going to the piano recital" (Japanese: ピアノ発表会に行くゾ) | July 12, 1998 |
| SPECIAL–20 | "Going to the villa" (Japanese: 別荘に行くゾ) | July 12, 1998 |
| SPECIAL–20 | "The Adventures of Buriburizaemon: The Soaring Chapter (1995) <R>" (Japanese: ぶりぶりざえもんの冒険（飛翔編）（1995年）〈再〉) | July 12, 1998 |
| SPECIAL–20 | "The Adventures of Buriburizaemon: The Lightning Chapter (1995) <R>" (Japanese: ぶりぶりざえもんの冒険（電光編）（1995年）〈再〉) | July 12, 1998 |
?? / ?? / Shinnosuke goes with Kazama to a piano recital, where Honoka, the girl Kazama likes, will be playing. / ?? / ?? / ??
| 282 | "Miss Masumi Secret Behind her Spectacles" (Japanese: メガネを外すと本音が出るゾ) | July 17, 1998 |
| 282 | "A War in the Nohara House" (Japanese: 怪獣ひまわりと戦うゾ) | July 17, 1998 |
| 282 | "Mom is Upset with Dad" (Japanese: ビアガーデンで盛りあがるゾ) | July 17, 1998 |
Masumi shares her secret with Yoshinaga about her spectacles. Shin-chan gives a demonstration of Masumi by taking off her glasses. / Shin-chan sets up borders to keep Himawari away from the dressing table. But Himawari overcomes every barrier and plays with the cosmetics. / Misae leaves the house with Himawari after an argument with Hiroshi. She enjoys juice and food at a restaurant with Micchi.
| 283 | "I want to enter the pool with my sister" (Japanese: おねいさんとプールに入りたいゾ) | July 24, 1998 |
| 283 | "Camping in School" (Japanese: 風間くんはオネショが心配だゾ) | July 24, 1998 |
| 283 | "We're Going to Micchi and Yoshirin's House" (Japanese: ミッチーヨシリンの育児だゾ) | July 24, 1998 |
?? / Kazama carries a diaper for his school camping, as he wets the bed. Shin-chan throws the diaper in the dustbin and leaves Kazama helpless. / Micchi and Yoshirin take up a task of babysitting Himawari and Shin-chan. But, they fail to manage Himawari.
| 284 | "Go to the pool with waves" (Japanese: 波の出るプールに行くゾ) | July 31, 1998 |
| 284 | "Eating Ice Candies" (Japanese: 夏はやっぱりかき氷が食べたいゾ) | July 31, 1998 |
| 284 | "A Failure in the AC" (Japanese: エアコンがこわれちゃったゾ) | July 31, 1998 |
?? / Shin-chan and his friend’s prepare ice candies in Misae’s absence. They mess the house by making a variety of ice candies. Misae returns from the market and gets angry at Shin-chan for messing the house. / Hiroshi wakes up annoyed as the AC vents out hot air. On checking the AC, the mechanic informs Hiroshi that it will take 2-3 days to repair the AC.
| 285 | "Playing the House Game" (Japanese: ネネちゃんのリアルおままごとだゾ) | August 7, 1998 |
| 285 | "Mom Has a Forgetting Habit" (Japanese: つぎからつぎへと忘れちゃうゾ) | August 7, 1998 |
| 285 | "Hiccups Won't Stop" (Japanese: しゃっくりが止まらないゾ) | August 7, 1998 |
Nene-chan plays the house game with Masao and Shin-chan. Nene-chan takes the game seriously and continues it even the next day. / Misae searches for the detergent in the house. She gets distracted by the other things and forgets about the detergent. / Himawari and Misae get hiccups. Hiroshi tries methods to treat their hiccups. After they get rid of their hiccups, Hiroshi gets hiccups.
| 286 | "Which Toy Should I Purchase?" (Japanese: おもちゃ選びでなやんじゃうゾ) | August 14, 1998 |
| 286 | "I Will Exact Revenge on Himawari" (Japanese: ケーキのうらみはこわいゾ) | August 14, 1998 |
| 286 | "Himawari Has Locked the Door" (Japanese: ベランダにしめ出された母ちゃんだゾ) | August 14, 1998 |
A lady takes Shin-chan and his friend’s help in purchasing a toy from a small toy store. Nene-chan’s suggestions change the lady’s mind. / Himawari eats Shin-chan’s favourite strawberry cake. Shin-chan takes his revenge. Eventually, he gets a big cake from Misae. / Himawari locks the balcony door and leaves Misae outside. Misae breaks the glass to enter the house.
| 287 | "Will Himawari be a Pianist?" (Japanese: ひまわりの将来に期待するゾ) | August 21, 1998 |
| 287 | "Micchi Will Tell Our Future" (Japanese: ミッチーの呪われた一日だゾ) | August 21, 1998 |
| 287 | "Bursting Crackers" (Japanese: オラ達一家の花火大会を楽しむゾ) | August 21, 1998 |
Misae convinces Hiroshi to buy a grand piano for Himawari with the hope that she would get famous. The thought of hard work changes their mind. / Micchi follows the tarot cards and stays with the Nohara family, as she expects danger. Her tarot card reading about Hiroshi comes true. / The Nohara family burns crackers. After burning the rocket, the family trips and falls in the water.
| 288 | "I'll Be a Silent Child Today" (Japanese: オラは静かなる男だゾ) | August 28, 1998 |
| 288 | "We're Going to Visit Miss Matsuzaka" (Japanese: まつざか先生のお見舞いだゾ) | August 28, 1998 |
| 288 | "Playing with the Cleaning Roller" (Japanese: おそうじ道具で遊んじゃうゾ) | August 28, 1998 |
Hiroshi strictly requests his family to maintain silence while he works. Hence, Shin-chan vows to remain silent and enacts through actions. / Shin-chan and his friends visit Matsuzaka in the hospital. They express happiness when they meet her. / Shin-chan plays with the cleaning roller. Himawari snatches the roller from Shin-chan and rolls it over Misae’s body. Misae flies into a rage at Shin-chan.
| 289 | "An embarrassing photo of Mom" (Japanese: 母ちゃんの恥ずかしい写真だゾ) | September 11, 1998 |
| 289 | "We Will Encourage Miss Masumi" (Japanese: 上尾先生をはげますゾ) | September 11, 1998 |
| 289 | "The Video Player Isn't Working" (Japanese: 父ちゃんのないしょのビデオだゾ) | September 11, 1998 |
While messing around with Misae's camera, Shin-chan and Himawari accidentally snap a nude photo of their mom. / Masumi faces an inferiority complex due to her tanned skin. But Yoshinaga and the children bring enthusiasm in her life. / Hiroshi brings home an adult video and switches it on after Misae and Himawari go out shopping. But unfortunately, the video player stops working.
| 290 | "Fighting the Mosquitoes" (Japanese: 母ちゃんは一晩中戦うゾ) | September 18, 1998 |
| 290 | "Visiting an Old Aunt" (Japanese: 大正生まれは元気だゾ) | September 18, 1998 |
| 290 | "Mom and Me Are Looking For Shiro" (Japanese: シロの散歩コースをたどるゾ) | September 18, 1998 |
Misae, to get rid of the mosquitoes, travels to various stores in the night to purchase mats for the mosquito repellent machine. / Shin-chan and his friends meet an old lady, named Sakurako, who claims to be young. Sakurako makes the children do the house cleaning. / Shin-chan forgets Shiro at some place. Misae and Shin-chan take an adventurous ride and find Shiro at a neighbour’s house.
| 291 | "Dad and Me Will Play the Airplane Game" (Japanese: 父ちゃんとヒコーキごっこだゾ) | September 25, 1998 |
| 291 | "Planet Earth is in Danger" (Japanese: 地下シェルターを作るゾ) | September 25, 1998 |
| 291 | "Miss Matsuzaka Will Be Discharged Today" (Japanese: まつざか先生の退院だゾ) | September 25, 1998 |
Shin-chan forces Hiroshi to play the aeroplane game as part of the promise he made to him. / Kazama and the children get afraid of meteoroids and dig the ground to create a bunker to save food for future. The principal suggests them to grow plants. / Matsuzaka’s sisters envy Matsuzaka. But Shin-chan unites Matsuzaka and Tokurou before Matsuzaka discharges from the hospital.
| SPECIAL–21 | "I’ve been messed up with Mom" (Japanese: 母ちゃんといれかわちゃったゾ) | October 2, 1998 |
| SPECIAL–21 | "Help foreigners" (Japanese: 外国人をお助けするゾ) | October 2, 1998 |
| SPECIAL–21 | "Kasukabe Boy Detective Agency" (Japanese: カスカベ少年探偵社だゾ) | October 2, 1998 |
| 292 | "Miss Matsuzaka Rejoins School" (Japanese: まつざか先生の復帰だゾ) | October 16, 1998 |
| 292 | "Misae Tells Himawari a Story" (Japanese: ひまわりだって読書の秋だゾ) | October 16, 1998 |
| 292 | "We're Going to the Park Today" (Japanese: 近くの公園に遊びに行くゾ) | October 16, 1998 |
Matsuzaka rejoins school with a changed behaviour. But Shin-chan’s mischief brings out Matsuzaka’s angry nature. / Misae reads a story to Himawari. As Himawari enjoys the story, she forces Misae to read the same story again and again. / Misae takes Shin-chan and Himawari to a park to enjoy the pleasant weather. She falls asleep and refuses to wake up in the evening.
| 293 | "Helping Miss Matsuzaka" (Japanese: まつざか先生のデートを守るゾ) | October 23, 1998 |
| 293 | "A Robber in Our House" (Japanese: 空き巣にご用心だゾ) | October 23, 1998 |
| 293 | "We Will Dig Out Potatoes" (Japanese: おイモ掘りに行くゾ) | October 23, 1998 |
Matsuzaka goes on a date with Dr Tokurou. Shin-chan and his friends follow Matsuzaka to help her succeed in her date. / Shin-chan meets a man in his house and plays a game with him without realising that he is the robber. / The Nohara family goes to a sweet potato farm and dig out many sweet potatoes. Nene-chan’s mother digs out a sweet potato but loses it thanks to Himawari.
| 294 | "A New Dishwasher in the House" (Japanese: 食器洗い機でらくちんだゾ) | October 30, 1998 |
| 294 | "Searching for Kazama's Lost Item" (Japanese: 風間君の好きなアニメキャラだゾ) | October 30, 1998 |
| 294 | "Can't sleep for some reason tonight (I Will Stay Awake in the Night)" (Japanese: 今夜は何だか眠れないゾ) | October 30, 1998 |
Hiroshi, on Misae’s insistence and requirement, buys a dishwasher. But Shin-chan puts his Kuntam Robo toy and spoils it. / Kazama loses his Mary-chan keychain on the road and denies that it belongs to him when Shin-chan finds it. / Shin-chan cannot sleep since he drinks coffee. He keeps Misae awake to accompany him. But he falls asleep and keeps Misae awake.
| 295 | "Bo-chan Gets the First Prize in Painting" (Japanese: ボーちゃんは埼玉一の園児だゾ) | November 6, 1998 |
| 295 | "Dad on a Morning Walk? Something is Fishy" (Japanese: 父ちゃんの朝の散歩は怪しいゾ) | November 6, 1998 |
| 295 | "I Will Spy on Dad" (Japanese: 父ちゃんの散歩の秘密を探るゾ) | November 6, 1998 |
Shin-chan, Masao, Kazama and Nene-chan organise a success party for Bo-chan as he wins the first prize in painting. / Hiroshi acts lazy to go for a walk early morning. But his meet with a young girl motivates him to visit the park daily. / Shin-chan spies on Hiroshi and clicks pictures of his meet with the young girl. Misae feels betrayed but finds relief when she learns about the girl.
| 296 | "I Found a Magical Thermos" (Japanese: オラと魔法の魔法ビンだゾ) | November 13, 1998 |
| 296 | "What are Nene-chan and Masao Hiding?" (Japanese: 怒るとこわいネネちゃんだゾ) | November 13, 1998 |
| 296 | "A New Cat in Our House" (Japanese: あずかった猫で大さわぎだゾ) | November 13, 1998 |
Shin-chan finds a magical thermos and invites a genie to grant him his wishes. Shin-chan asks the Genie to grant Himawari good health. / Nene-chan eats sweets potatoes and farts. She threatens Masao to keep mum about it. But Masao blurts out the truth about Nene-chan. / Hiroshi brings home an expensive cat from his boss. The cat hides in Shiro’s house and leaves the Nohara family worried for him.
| 297 | "We Will Eat Sweet Potatoes" (Japanese: 風間くんと焼きイモするゾ) | November 20, 1998 |
| 297 | "Yoshirin Has Left the House" (Japanese: ヨシリンが家出してきたゾ) | November 20, 1998 |
| 297 | "Yoshirin is Back With Micchi" (Japanese: 夫婦ゲンカのまきぞえだゾ) | November 20, 1998 |
Shin-chan and Kazama do a part-time job at a vegetable store. They earn sweet potatoes and relish it with Nene-chan and her mother. / Yoshirin shifts into Hiroshi’s house after an argument with Micchi. Shin-chan creates a misunderstanding between Yoshirin and Micchi. / Shin-chan’s misunderstanding brings Micchi and Yoshirin together. But it triggers an argument between Hiroshi and Misae.
| 298 | "Rocky and boxing showdown" (Japanese: ロッキーとボクシング対決だゾ) | November 27, 1998 |
| 298 | "I can’t allow the city to get dirty" (Japanese: 街を汚すのは許さないゾ) | November 27, 1998 |
| 298 | "Ageo-sensei’s training" (Japanese: 上尾先生のトレーニングだゾ) | November 27, 1998 |
| 299 | "Will I be Gifted the Action Mask Present?" (Japanese: アクション仮面のプレゼントだゾ) | December 4, 1998 |
| 299 | "We Will Follow Miss Matsuzaka" (Japanese: まつざか先生のデートを追跡だゾ) | December 4, 1998 |
| 299 | "Going for a Car Wash" (Japanese: コイン洗車場に行くゾ) | December 4, 1998 |
Shin-chan inserts a videotape into the player to record the details regarding Action Mask’s diamond beam, but the program ends. / The Kasukabe follow Matsuzaka and Dr Tokorou and attempt to bring them closer using water and leaves. / Shin-chan tags along with Hiroshi to the car washing centre and creates trouble for Hiroshi with his mischief.
| 300 | "Himawari Troubles Me Again" (Japanese: ひまわりとレターセットだゾ) | December 11, 1998 |
| 300 | "Mom Will Drop Me to School" (Japanese: 母ちゃんたちのおしゃべりだゾ) | December 11, 1998 |
| 300 | "Miss Yoshinaga is Going on a Date" (Japanese: デートに行けないよしなが先生だゾ) | December 11, 1998 |
Shin-chan and Himawari get into a fight as Himawari refuses to return Shin-chan the pen which was important to Misae. / Misae drops Shin-chan to school and meets Kazama, Nene-chan and Masao’s mother. They spend time at a coffee shop together. / Ishizaka calls Yoshinaga on the school landline. The children and teachers get inquisitive about Yoshinaga’s plans and trouble her.
| SPECIAL–22 | "A gratitude for the stone statue" (Japanese: 石像の恩返しだゾ) | December 25, 1998 |
| SPECIAL–22 | "Beer is an adult taste" (Japanese: ビールは大人の味だゾ) | December 25, 1998 |
| SPECIAL–22 | "Caught in a traffic jam" (Japanese: 交通渋滞にまきこまれたゾ) | December 25, 1998 |
| SPECIAL–22 | "Crayon Daichushingara (Sakura no Maki)" (Japanese: クレヨン大忠臣蔵（桜の巻）) | December 25, 1998 |
| SPECIAL–22 | "Crayon Daichushingura (Snow Roll)" (Japanese: クレヨン大忠臣蔵（雪の巻）) | December 25, 1998 |

== 1999 ==
| No. | Title | Original release date |
|---|---|---|
| 301 | "Flying a kite is difficult" (Japanese: たこ上げはむずかしいゾ) | January 8, 1999 |
| 301 | "Protecting Kazama" (Japanese: 風間くんの不幸なジンクスだゾ) | January 8, 1999 |
| 301 | "Dad Stays Out Whole Night" (Japanese: 父ちゃんのヒサンな一夜だゾ) | January 8, 1999 |
Shinnosuke makes a kite and flies it away all over town, causing trouble for students taking exams, A college guy who is trying to pick up girls, and Nene's mom / Kazama considers it to be a jinx when someone blows air into his ears. So, Shin-chan and the others turn into bodyguards to protect Kazama. / Misae leaves the door unchained for Hiroshi as he would return home late. But Shin-chan puts the door chain and causes inconvenience for Hiroshi.
| 302 | "A Brother-sister Love Between Me and Himawari" (Japanese: オラとひまわりの兄妹愛だゾ) | January 15, 1999 |
| 302 | "We Will Find Interesting Stones Today" (Japanese: おもしろ石を探すゾ) | January 15, 1999 |
| 302 | "I Will Save Nanako Today" (Japanese: ななこお父さんと再会だゾ) | January 15, 1999 |
| 303 | "Today's Day is Weird" (Japanese: デートに燃えるまつざか先生だゾ) | January 22, 1999 |
| 303 | "A female professional wrestling of the Red Scorpion Corps" (Japanese: 紅さそり隊の女子プロレスだゾ) | January 22, 1999 |
| 303 | "Going to the Market to Purchase Organic Eggs" (Japanese: 先着サービスはのがさないゾ) | January 22, 1999 |
Matsuzaka meets Dr Tokorou in the park. But Dr Tokorou finds bones more interesting and negotiates with Shiro for it. / ?? / Misae reads about organic eggs being sold at a supermarket. She stands in a long queue but returns with broken eggs.
| 304 | "Visiting a Bumper Sale" (Japanese: バーゲンの朝は忙しいゾ) | January 29, 1999 |
| 304 | "I'm Kazama's Best Friend" (Japanese: オラと風間くんは大親友だゾ) | January 29, 1999 |
| 304 | "We've Realised That Pencil Cells Are Very Important" (Japanese: 乾電池でパニックだゾ) | January 29, 1999 |
Misae gets excited to grab the bumper sale opportunity. However, obstacles come her way and she doesn’t reach on time. / Izumi-chan, Kazama’s tuition classmate, meets Kazama's friends and finds them weird. Hence, she breaks her friendship with Kazama. / The Nohara family struggles for the pencil cells. Shin-chan uses a pencil cell from the alarm clock and delays the daily routine.
| 305 | "Mom will Fix the Kuntam Robo" (Japanese: カンタムロボが壊れたゾ) | February 5, 1999 |
| 305 | "Playing in the Ice" (Japanese: 寒い朝は氷で遊んじゃうゾ) | February 5, 1999 |
| 305 | "Visiting the Hot Spring" (Japanese: 冬はやっぱり温泉がいいゾ) | February 5, 1999 |
Shin-chan breaks his Kuntam Robo. Misae stamps the robot and assumes she has broken it and tries hard to fix the damage. / Shin-chan plays in the ice with Masao. Shin-chan drops a man and his dog in the ice water as they threaten him. / The Nohara family visits a hotel with Micchi and Yoshirin to enjoy hot spring bath. Hiroshi competes with Micchi and Yoshirin in a table tennis match and loses it.
| 306 | "A translation of the director’s tears" (Japanese: 園長先生の涙の訳だゾ) | February 12, 1999 |
| 306 | "It Will be Fun in the Mall Today" (Japanese: 紅さそり隊の着ぐるみバイトだゾ) | February 12, 1999 |
| 306 | "Patrolling the City" (Japanese: 父ちゃんと夜まわりだゾ) | February 12, 1999 |
?? / The Saitama Crimson Scorpions do a part-time job at a departmental store. Shin-chan’s intervention leads to damage of the store property. / Hiroshi and Shin-chan go patrolling in the city. They visit Nanako and picks apples from her on their way back home.
| 307 | "Mom and Micchi Will Collect Money Today" (Japanese: 取りたて屋の母ちゃんだゾ) | February 19, 1999 |
| 307 | "Nene-chan is the Tragedy Heroine" (Japanese: 不幸のヒロイン? ネネちゃんだゾ) | February 19, 1999 |
| 307 | "I Went to School on a Holiday" (Japanese: オラ一人だけの幼稚園だゾ) | February 19, 1999 |
Misae and Micchi go house to house to collect the society maintenance fee. A man offers Misae the money basis her hard work. / Shin-chan, Kazama, Bo-chan and Masao visit Nene-chan and play the Cinderella game. The boys eat the pastries that Nene-chan’s mother brings. / Misae drops Shin-chan to school on a declared holiday. While she returns to take him back, Shin-chan plays in the school.
| 308 | "Mom is Working on the Savings" (Japanese: 倹約でビンボー生活だゾ) | March 5, 1999 |
| 308 | "Nene-chan Does Fortune Telling" (Japanese: ネネちゃんの恋占いは当たるゾ) | March 5, 1999 |
| 308 | "Going to a Poetry Class" (Japanese: 俳句は五七五の文学だゾ) | March 5, 1999 |
Misae, with the hope of saving money, cuts down on the family expenses. But after a while, she refuses to follow her own rules. / Nene-chan predicts people’s future and tells them about their lucky charm. It works for Masao, but not for Kawamura. / Misae and Shin-chan visit a poetry class to take poetry lessons. But Shin-chan’s mischief troubles the teacher and makes him regret.
| 309 | "I Will Collect Used Cans" (Japanese: あき缶のアクション仮面だゾ) | March 5, 1999 |
| 309 | "Only I am Himawari's Elder Brother" (Japanese: オラのお兄ちゃんの立場が危ないゾ) | March 5, 1999 |
| 309 | "A Toy House in Our House" (Japanese: おもちゃのおうちで遊ぶゾ) | March 5, 1999 |
Shin-chan collects a bag full of used cans to make an Action Mask statue. But, a group of trash cleaning volunteers takes it from him. / Bo-chan plays with Himawari as an elder brother. Shin-chan gets jealous and tries to make his place in Himawari’s heart. / Misae wins a toy house in a contest. She enters the small house somehow but finds it difficult to come out of it and gets stuck inside.
| 310 | "Himawari's Secret Collection" (Japanese: ひまわりの（秘）コレクションだゾ) | March 19, 1999 |
| 310 | "Masao-kun’s tough test" (Japanese: マサオくんのきびしい試練だゾ) | March 19, 1999 |
| 310 | "What is Wrong With Our Memory?" (Japanese: 忘れ物一家の日曜日だゾ) | March 19, 1999 |
Himawari searches Shin-chan’s Action Mask book as it has a picture of a handsome man. But she doesn’t realise that the book was under a cushion. / ?? / Misae scolds Hiroshi for forgetting the meat. But the next day, she forgets to wear her skirt and take Himawari along.
| 311 | "Mom and I Will Eat at an Expensive Restaurant" (Japanese: 外食で楽しいランチタイムだゾ) | April 9, 1999 |
| 311 | "What Will We Be When We Grow Up?" (Japanese: 将来に悩むマサオくんだゾ) | April 9, 1999 |
| 311 | "Dad gets an Increase in Pocket Money" (Japanese: 父ちゃんが家出したゾ) | April 9, 1999 |
Shin-chan orders two large meals at an expensive restaurant and fails to finish it. So, Misae forces Shin-chan’s share of the meal down her throat. / Masao gets worried about his future. But on hearing about the principal and the teacher’s dreams, Masao feels optimistic. / Hiroshi leaves the house as Misae refuses to increase his pocket money. But he returns home in the night as he feels hungry.
| SPECIAL–23 | "I like Hanasaka Jiisan" (Japanese: オラ的な花さかじいさんだゾ) | April 16, 1999 |
| SPECIAL–23 | "Life doesn’t go according to plan" (Japanese: 人生は計画どおりにいかないゾ) | April 16, 1999 |
| SPECIAL–23 | "I want to go to a hot spring in Fukubiki" (Japanese: 福引きで温泉に行きたいゾ) | April 16, 1999 |
| SPECIAL–23 | "Dad who is particular about hot springs" (Japanese: 温泉にこだわる父ちゃんだゾ) | April 16, 1999 |
| 312 | "Mom and I Will Take English Lessons" (Japanese: 母ちゃんと一緒に英会話を習うゾ) | April 23, 1999 |
| 312 | "We're Being Recorded on the Handycam" (Japanese: ビデオはすべてを見ていたゾ) | April 23, 1999 |
| 312 | "Dad Cooks Kusaya" (Japanese: クサヤの匂いはキョーレツだゾ) | April 23, 1999 |
Misae and Shin-chan take English tutorials from Kitamoto. However, instead of learning English, they talk about family serials. / Nene-chan's mother hides a Handycam to record Nene's candid video. But, Shin-chan's mischief gets caught on the camera. / Hiroshi cooks a stinking fish. Misae and Shin-chan refuse to eat it due to the strong smell. After tasting it, they empty the bowl.
| 313 | "Himawari is subordinate" (Japanese: ひまわりはオラの子分だゾ) | April 30, 1999 |
| 313 | "We Will Eat Principal's Strawberry Cake" (Japanese: 組長先生のイチゴケーキだゾ) | April 30, 1999 |
| 313 | "How Can I Sleep in So Much of Noise?" (Japanese: うるさくて眠れない夜だゾ) | April 30, 1999 |
?? / The principal brings a strawberry cake for himself. But Shin-chan and his friends eat almost 3/4th of the cake and leave a pastry for the principal. / Shin-chan doesn’t get sleep in the night. The sounds around him disturb him. Eventually, he sleeps and wakes the family with his fart smell.
| 314 | "My Skin Will Be Silky Smooth" (Japanese: オラもお化粧できれいになるゾ) | May 7, 1999 |
| 314 | "I Will Be a Lucky Boy Today" (Japanese: オラは幸せを呼ぶ園児だゾ) | May 7, 1999 |
| 314 | "Will I get to Play Football Today?" (Japanese: お手伝いから逃げ出すゾ) | May 7, 1999 |
Shin-chan applies Misae’s face mask on his face and body to make his skin silky smooth. As a result, Misae gets furious at Shin-chan. / Shin-chan meets a lonely man and turns his unlucky day into a lucky one. The man meets a young girl and goes on a lunch with her. / Misae refuses Shin-chan to play football and assigns him a work. Shin-chan completes Misae’s work as well and gets a chance to play.
| 315 | "Mom is Himawari's Role Model" (Japanese: 母ちゃんはひまわりのお手本だゾ) | May 14, 1999 |
| 315 | "Principal Will Tell Us a Story" (Japanese: 通園バスは眠くなるゾ) | May 14, 1999 |
| 315 | "Who Do I Resemble" (Japanese: オラは誰にも似てないゾ) | May 14, 1999 |
Himawari imitates Misae’s gestures. Hence, Misae turns into a role model for Himawari so that she incorporates the good habits. / The principal tells the children his real-life story to keep them awake. But only Shin-chan shows interest in the story. / Yoshinaga asks the students to draw pictures of their parents. Shin-chan gets suspicious about his identity in the Nohara family.
| 316 | "Watching my Childhood Video" (Japanese: オラの赤ちゃん時代のビデオだゾ) | May 21, 1999 |
| 316 | "Today Kazama Will be Shin-chan Nohara" (Japanese: 風間くんといれかわるゾ) | May 21, 1999 |
| 316 | "Seeing a New Flat" (Japanese: アパート探しをするゾ) | May 21, 1999 |
Misae searches for an old plate. While watching a video of Shin-chan’s infanthood at Kei’s place, she recollects that the plate is with Kei. / Kazama exchanges his life with Shin-chan for a day so as to be free from the stress of the classes. / Misae goes house hunting for Kawaguchi and finalises a flat for him. Next day, Kawaguchi shifts into Nohara family’s neighbourhood.
| 317 | "Going to Buy a Gift" (Japanese: 母ちゃんのこだわり記念品だゾ) | May 28, 1999 |
| 317 | "Matsuzaka and Dr Tokurou's Relationship is in Danger" (Japanese: 別れる運命のまつざか先生だゾ) | May 28, 1999 |
| 317 | "Watching Action Mask at a TV Store" (Japanese: テレビ売り場から離れられないゾ) | May 28, 1999 |
Misae forces Hiroshi to drive her to the bakery to buy a cake and win a gift in return. But all the cakes get sold off. / The Kasukabe Defence Force tries hard to maintain Dr Tokurou and Matsuzaka’s relationship despite the rumours. / Shin-chan watches Action Mask complete episode and a two-hour special broadcast at an electronics store.
| 318 | "Grandfather Will Visit Us Today" (Japanese: じいちゃんは恋のライバルだゾ) | June 4, 1999 |
| 318 | "I Will Exercise With Grandfather" (Japanese: じいちゃんは早起きだゾ) | June 4, 1999 |
| 318 | "We're Going to See a Picnic Spot" (Japanese: 遠足の下見に行くゾ) | June 4, 1999 |
Hiroshi’s father pays a surprise visit and tags along with Nanako and Shin-chan to the shopping mall. / Hiroshi’s father and Shin-chan wake up at 4 am and exercise. Hiroshi and Misae experience sleepless nights and mornings. / Shin-chan and Nene-chan follow the principal and Masumi to a picnic spot. But the rains interrupt them.
| 319 | "Mom Will Read a Story Book" (Japanese: 本を読むのは楽しいゾ) | June 11, 1999 |
| 319 | "Me and Kazama are Going to the Salon" (Japanese: 風間くんのオシャレにつきあうゾ) | June 11, 1999 |
| 319 | "Going on a Space Trip" (Japanese: スペースシャトルに乗るゾ) | June 11, 1999 |
Misae reads a storybook to both her children and puts them to sleep. She thinks of taking a nap but Himawari ruins her plans. / Kazama visits a salon to get a haircut. Shin-chan also walks into the salon and attracts all the attention of the hairstylists. / Shin-chan collects stamps to win a trip to space. He and Hiroshi practice the space scenes to fulfil their dream of travelling to space.
| 320 | "The Clothes Are Not Getting Dry" (Japanese: 洗たく物がかわかないゾ) | June 18, 1999 |
| 320 | "Finding a New Home for Shiro" (Japanese: 口紅はわざわいのもとだゾ) | June 18, 1999 |
| 320 | "Hiding a Gift is Not Easy" (Japanese: シロがひまわりをかんだゾ) | June 18, 1999 |
Misae dries the clothes with much effort. In order to save the clothes from burning, Hiroshi throws water on all the clothes again. / Shin-chan follows his intuition that Misae will remove Shiro out of the house. So, he hands over Shiro to the principal. / Hiroshi buys a gift for Misae. Himawari and Shin-chan find the lipstick and use it. Misae gets angry at Hiroshi due to a misunderstanding.
| 321 | "The whole family is sick" | June 25, 1999 |
| 322 | "Enjoy Japanese summer with edamame" (Japanese: 枝豆で日本の夏を味わうゾ) | July 2, 1999 |
| 322 | "I Will Wear a Traditional Dress" (Japanese: オラはユカタもお似合いだゾ) | July 2, 1999 |
| 322 | "We're Making Pasta" (Japanese: 手作りパスタを作るゾ) | July 2, 1999 |
Shin-chan wears the kimono gifted by his grandmother. He goes out with his friends and returns home in a distressed kimono. / Himawari drops Misae's necklace in the pasta dough. Misae turns on the new pasta machine and breaks her necklace.
| 323 | "A Fight Between Himawari and the Fan" (Japanese: ひまわりと扇風機の戦いだゾ) | July 9, 1999 |
| 323 | "Miss Ageo Hates Heights" (Japanese: 上尾先生は高いところがこわいゾ) | July 9, 1999 |
| 323 | "Cleaning My House" (Japanese: 野原一家は秘密がいっぱいだゾ) | July 9, 1999 |
Himawari gets angry as the fan doesn't blow air towards her. Shin-chan repairs the fan and makes it convenient for Himawari. / As Masumi is afraid of heights, Shin-chan removes Masumi's glasses and encourages her to climb up the tree and help the kitten. / The Nohara family hides their personal belongings in different places. Their secrets are unveiled while cleaning the house.
| 324 | "The Kasukabe Defence Force Will Be Separated" (Japanese: カスカベ防衛隊をやめちゃうゾ) | July 16, 1999 |
| 324 | "The Kasukabe Defence Force Unites" (Japanese: 防衛隊の陣とり争いだゾ) | July 16, 1999 |
| 324 | "Dad Will Write a Speech" (Japanese: スピーチで悩む父ちゃんだゾ) | July 16, 1999 |
Shin-chan and his friends quit the Kasukabe Defence Force and begin working individually. / The partition between the Kasukabe Defence Force widens. But Bo-chan's thoughts helps keep the team united. / Hiroshi pens a father's feelings for a daughter on a piece of paper so as to read it at a wedding. But Himawari tears the paper into pieces.
| 325 | "Misae Gets a New Hair Style" (Japanese: 母ちゃんが髪形を変えたゾ) | July 23, 1999 |
| 325 | "Misae Cuts Her Hair, Once Again" (Japanese: だんだん変になる髪形だゾ) | July 23, 1999 |
| 325 | "A New Side of Masao" (Japanese: 物まね上手のマサオくんだゾ) | July 23, 1999 |
Misae gets a new hairstyle. Shin-chan assumes the hairstyle to be imperfect and shaves a part of Misae's head. / Misae gets shocked when she sees a bald patch on her head. She goes to a nearby parlour and changes her hairstyle to fix the patch. / Masao surprises his friends with his acting talent. He imitates Nene-chan and makes her angry.
| 326 | "Cutting the Grass of the Lawn" (Japanese: 真夏の草むしりだゾ) | July 30, 1999 |
| 326 | "Nene-chan Turns Into a Cook" (Japanese: ネネちゃんのままごとを改善するゾ) | July 30, 1999 |
| 326 | "Who Will Win Today's Competition?" (Japanese: ゆとりをもって生活するゾ) | July 30, 1999 |
In order to fulfil Misae's dream of having a beautiful lawn, Shin-chan and Hiroshi clean the garden and grow plants. / Nene-chan prepares Masao's favourite dishes while playing the house game. Shin-chan disturbs them and forces Nene-chan to leave. / Hiroshi and Misae realise that their habit of doing things in a hurry could affect their children. So, they get into a competition of staying calm.
| 327 | "Guests at My Place" (Japanese: 野原家の知り合い全員集合だゾ) | August 6, 1999 |
| 327 | "More Guest and More Talks" (Japanese: 大家族はそうぞうしいゾ) | August 6, 1999 |
| 327 | "A Big Family is So Much Fun" (Japanese: 家族はやっぱりいいもんだゾ) | August 6, 1999 |
Misae and Hiroshi's parents pay a surprise visit to Misae and her family. Kei, Micchi, Yoshirin and Masae also join in as guests. / Misae gets busy catering to the needs of the guests. The family and friends spend time together and have a big conversation. / Misae's father treats everyone with ice cream parlour as he wins a lottery. After everyone leaves, Shin-chan's friends arrive as guests.
| 328 | "Dad Tells Us a Story" (Japanese: 父ちゃんの怖い話だゾ) | August 13, 1999 |
| 328 | "Dad Brings a Doll for Himawari" (Japanese: 本当に怖い呪いの人形の話だゾ) | August 13, 1999 |
| 328 | "I'm Going Out With Nanako" (Japanese: なな子おねいさんとおばけ屋敷だゾ) | August 13, 1999 |
Hiroshi tells Shin-chan and Hiroshi a story of a farmer and a witch and the way the two doughs defeat the witch with 'laddoos'. / Hiroshi brings a doll for Himawari. The doll seeks to take revenge from the family. But, Shin-chan puts an end to the doll's story. / Shin-chan visits an Amusement Park with Nanako and Shinobu. He faces a real ghost fearlessly and drops her into the water.
| 329 | "What Do I Want From the Market?" (Japanese: おつかいは疲れるゾ) | August 20, 1999 |
| 329 | "We Will Click Many Pictures Today" (Japanese: 写真を撮って10万円ゲットだゾ) | August 20, 1999 |
| 329 | "What Will Dr Tokurou Say?" (Japanese: まつざか先生プロポーズを待つゾ) | August 20, 1999 |
Misae sends Shin-chan to the market to buy chicken. But he gets distracted and forgets what he actually wanted. / Hiroshi and Misae participate in a contest of clicking pictures for a reward of 100,000 yen. But Shin-chan drops a camera worth 100,000 yen into the water. / Dr Tokurou invites Matsuzaka to the park. The children anticipate Dr Tokurou's words. Matsuzaka gets stunned at Dr Tokurou.
| 330 | "We Have a lot of Coupons" (Japanese: 期限ギリギリ地域振興券を使うゾ) | August 27, 1999 |
| 330 | "Famous Comic Writer Arrested" (Japanese: 有名マンガ家のサイナンだゾ) | August 27, 1999 |
| 330 | "We Will Help Miss Matsuzaka" (Japanese: まつざか先生愛のゴールは遠いゾ) | August 27, 1999 |
The Nohara family rush to the supermarket to avail the coupons that expire on the present day. But they get nothing. / Yoshi writes a robbery story for his assignment. Shin-chan deposits the diary to the police, who arrest Yoshi assuming him to a robber. / Matsuzaka gets excited to cook lunch for Dr Tokurou. The children try helping her. But Dr Tokurou cancels the lunch.
| 331 | "What Will Happen to Dr Tokurou? / Miss Matsuzaka is in a Bad Mood / We Are Going to the Airport" | September 3, 1999 |
Matsuzaka gets angry at Dr Tokurou and they part ways. Dr Tokurou gets an opportunity to go to South America for a research. / Shin-chan and his friends bring Matsuzaka and Dr Tokurou together. Dr Tokurou asks Matsuzaka to come along with him to South America. / Matsuzaka refuses Dr Tokurou's proposal. But, she realises her mistake and heads to the airport to express her love.
| 332 | "Mom and Dad's Past(母ちゃんと父ちゃんの過去だゾ)" | September 10, 1999 |
The Nohara family and the Honda family visit the memory museum. Kei begins telling Shin-chan about Hiroshi and Misae's story. / Kei continues with the story of how Misae's father meets Hiroshi and his father. She shares their conversations and reactions. / Hiroshi refuses to marry Misae. But Hiroshi soon realises his love for Misae and convinces her father to agree to their marriage.
| 333 | "Himawari Troubles Me a Lot" (Japanese: ひまわりと絶交だゾ) | September 17, 1999 |
| 333 | "A Special Training for Shiro" (Japanese: 名犬シロの入隊訓練をするゾ) | September 17, 1999 |
| 333 | "Mom is Troubled by the Rains" (Japanese: 台風みさえは大荒れだゾ) | September 17, 1999 |
Himawari troubles Shin-chan by scattering his Action Mask toy. Shin-chan leaves the house in anger but returns with ice creams. / The Kasukabe Defence Force trains Shiro to be a part of the team. Shiro proves his worth by helping the team. / Misae gets troubled by the heavy rainfall, as it adds to the housework. Hiroshi boasts about going to work and gets a beating from Misae.
| 334 | "Dad Will Work on a Holiday" (Japanese: 父ちゃんの休日はくつろがないゾ) | September 24, 1999 |
| 334 | "Himawari Visits My School" (Japanese: ひまわりの一日幼稚園だゾ) | September 24, 1999 |
| 334 | "Listening to the Crickets Chirp" (Japanese: 鈴虫の音で風流するゾ) | September 24, 1999 |
Hiroshi decides to have fun on his paid leave. But Misae leaves the children with Hiroshi and goes out for shopping and lunch. / Misae leaves Himawari with the principal and goes to the doctor. Himawari troubles the school staff and the children with her mischief. / The Nohara family brings 3 boxes of crickets. The chirping sounds of the crickets bring excitement to the family.
| 335 | "I Won't Give My Hippo Clip to Anyone" (Japanese: カバさんクリップがブームだゾ) | October 1, 1999 |
| 335 | "Nene-chan's Special Skill" (Japanese: 魔女っ子マリーちゃんに挑戦だゾ) | October 1, 1999 |
| 335 | "Himawari Leads Me in a Trouble Always" (Japanese: おひるねの時間だゾ) | October 1, 1999 |
Shin-chan and Himawari get into a fight for a hippo clip as they consider it to be lucky for them. / Kazama uses Nene-chan's special skill and wins a chain in the machine game. / Himawari messes the house and puts Shin-chan in trouble for the sake of a magazine that has a handsome man's picture on it.
| SPECIAL–24 | "Mysterious Magical Girl Mari-chan☆" (Japanese: ふしぎ魔女っ子マリーちゃん☆) | October 8, 1999 |
| SPECIAL–24 | "Mysterious witch Mari-chan" (Japanese: ふしぎ魔女っ子マリーちゃんだゾ) | October 8, 1999 |
| SPECIAL–24 | "Get a gold metal" (Japanese: 金メダルをもらうゾ) | October 8, 1999 |
| SPECIAL–24 | "Detective Nohara’s Casebook Idol Assassination Plan" (Japanese: 野原刑事の事件簿 アイドル暗殺計画) | October 8, 1999 |
| SPECIAL–24 | "Detective Nohara’s casebook assassination group undercover investigation" (Japanese: 野原刑事の事件簿 暗殺団潜入捜査) | October 8, 1999 |
| 336 | "Driving a Car is Risky" (Japanese: おもちゃの車で大暴れだゾ) | October 22, 1999 |
| 336 | "Dad Is Suffering From Severe Toothache" (Japanese: 父ちゃんは虫歯がいたいゾ) | October 22, 1999 |
| 336 | "I Will Cook Tasty Food" (Japanese: ロベルト君とおナベを作るゾ) | October 22, 1999 |
Shin-chan gets stuck into his old toy car. Robert, a neighbour helps Shin-chan get out of it. / Hiroshi suffers a toothache. Shin-chan hurts Hiroshi's tooth even more and makes it worse. As a result, he fails to enjoy meat for dinner. / Shin-chan prepares lunch at home in Misae and Himawari's absence. Robert, a neighbour, gets excited with the Japanese vessels.
| 337 | "The Summers Have Ended and the Winters Have Begun" (Japanese: 扇風機をかたづけるゾ) | October 29, 1999 |
| 337 | "Visiting a College Festival With Nanako" (Japanese: 女子大生の学園祭は楽しいゾ) | October 29, 1999 |
| 337 | "Playing a Unique Game With Dad" (Japanese: 父ちゃんと靴磨き屋さんだゾ) | October 29, 1999 |
As the winters have begun, Shin-chan packs the fan and places it in the cabinet. / Hiroshi and Shin-chan visit a college festival with Nanako. Hiroshi takes part in a pro wrestling match against Shinobu. / Shin-chan and Hiroshi play the shoe polish game. Shin-chan ruins Misae's shoe and makes her furious.
| 338 | "Mom Drinks a Bitter Medicine" (Japanese: 母ちゃんのバリウム体験だゾ) | November 5, 1999 |
| 338 | "Watching a Film Shooting" (Japanese: マリーちゃんの撮影を見学だゾ) | November 5, 1999 |
| 338 | "Mom Will Make Momos" (Japanese: オラ流本格ギョーザの作り方だゾ) | November 5, 1999 |
Misae goes to the clinic to get an X-ray done. Shin-chan pesters Misae during the tests. However, Misae's reports reflect good health. / Kazama gets excited to meet his favourite actress, Mary-chan. But Shin-chan's presence at the shoot gives away Kazama's opportunity. / Misae prepares momos after watching a recipe on TV. Shin-chan also tries his hands on momos and prepares tasty momos.
| 339 | "A Storm Called: New Kindergartener Ai Suotome Appears" (Japanese: 嵐を呼ぶ園児・酢乙女あい登場だゾ) | November 12, 1999 |
| 339 | "Masao-kun, Prisoner of Love" (Japanese: 恋のとりこのマサオくんだゾ) | November 12, 1999 |
| 339 | "Mom is Making a Variety of Vegetables These Days" (Japanese: 母ちゃんがモテモテだゾ) | November 12, 1999 |
Ai-chan, a new student, joins Futaba Kindergarten. She introduces herself to her classmates and befriends Masao. / ?? / Misae gets attracted to Yasushi, a vegetable vendor, and buys a variety of vegetables every day from his shop.
| 340 | "What is Wrong With Mom?" (Japanese: 恋に落ちた母ちゃんだゾ) | November 19, 1999 |
| 340 | "What is the Competition Between Kazama and Masao?" (Japanese: あいちゃんのミリョクには逆らえないゾ) | November 19, 1999 |
| 340 | "Himawari is Angry at Mom" (Japanese: ひまわりが母ちゃんと決闘だゾ) | November 19, 1999 |
Misae visits the vegetable store to meet Yasushi. Yasushi gives Misae a letter which states 'every problem has an end'. / Ai-chan turns Kazama and Masao into opponents. Nene-chan gets angry at Ai-chan as she breaks her team. / Himawari gets angry at Misae as she throws away handsome men's photographs. She takes revenge by harassing Misae and Shin-chan.
| 341 | "Another Day of Commotion in the School" (Japanese: あいちゃんの人気はすさまじいゾ) | November 26, 1999 |
| 341 | "Playing Dodgeball in School" (Japanese: あいちゃんとネネちゃんの対決だゾ) | November 26, 1999 |
| 341 | "Handling Himawari is a Task" (Japanese: ひまわりはウチの箱入り娘だゾ) | November 26, 1999 |
Nene-chan makes plans to divert Kazama, Masao and Bo-chan's attention towards her. As her plan fails, she vents her anger at the school property. / Nene-chan challenges Ai-chan in dodgeball. Shin-chan's strike at Ai-chan helps Nene-chan win the match. / Misae leaves Himawari with Shin-chan and goes out. Himawari messes the folded clothes and harasses Shin-chan.
| 342 | "Ai-chan Falls For Me" (Japanese: あいちゃんはオラに夢中だゾ) | December 3, 1999 |
| 342 | "Sumo Wrestling Between Me and Kazama" (Japanese: 風間くんと恋の決闘だゾ) | December 3, 1999 |
| 342 | "Himawari, a Fortune Teller" (Japanese: ひまわりの大予言だゾ) | December 3, 1999 |
Ai-chan develops an interest in Shin-chan and forces him to accompany her for shopping. But, Shin-chan refuses as he hates shopping. / Kazama challenges Shin-chan in a Sumo wrestling match. Although Kazama wins the match, Ai-chan supports Shin-chan. / Misae tries her luck on a game on the basis of Himawari fortune telling. However, she returns home with tissue papers.
| 343 | "A Five Year Old Troubles the Elders" (Japanese: 父ちゃんと母ちゃんの秘密は美味しいゾ) | December 10, 1999 |
| 343 | "Masao Learns Special Defence Technique" (Japanese: 男の必殺技をマスターするゾ) | December 10, 1999 |
| 343 | "We Are Going to Meet Yasushi Uncle" (Japanese: みさえの恋の終着駅だゾ) | December 10, 1999 |
Misae and Hiroshi break each other's favourite things. Shin-chan blackmails his parents to fulfil his wishes to keep mum about it. / Masao's friends train Masao to be strong and confident. While all fails, Shin-chan's technique works in favour of Masao. / Yasushi takes Misae and her children to an old age home that he usually visits. Misae gets angry at Shin-chan for revealing her shopping habits.

== 2000 ==
| No. | Title | Original release date |
|---|---|---|
| 344 | "I will Sell Yakiimo" (Japanese: オラは焼きイモの達人だゾ) | January 14, 2000 |
| 344 | "We Will Trouble Kazama" (Japanese: マリーちゃんがカスカベで戦うゾ) | January 14, 2000 |
| 344 | "A New Fridge in Our House" (Japanese: オラんちの冷蔵庫を取りかえるゾ) | January 14, 2000 |
Shin-chan invites Misae and the neighbours to purchase sweet potatoes and helps the Saitama Crimson Scorpions. / Shin-chan and his friends watch Magical Mari and play pranks on Kazama. / Misae purchases a new fridge for the sake of coupons. But she's disappointed when she finds out that the coupons are expired.
| 345 | "I'm a Brilliant Dancer" (Japanese: オラは天才バレリーナだゾ) | January 21, 2000 |
| 345 | "I Want Internet" (Japanese: インターネットをのぞいちゃうゾ) | January 21, 2000 |
| 345 | "Me and Dad at a Coffee Shop" (Japanese: 父ちゃんと二人でお茶するゾ) | January 21, 2000 |
Misae admits Shin-chan in a dance institute to learn ballet. Shin-chan annoys the dance trainer with his impressive dance moves. / The principal brings a computer to school to use the internet. Masumi stuns everyone with her knowledge of the internet. / In Misae's absence, Hiroshi, Shin-chan and Himawari visit a coffee shop. The owner serves a number of dishes and gives a bill of 7000 yen.
| 346 | "Savings is My Responsibility" (Japanese: オラは野原家一のセツヤク家だゾ) | January 28, 2000 |
| 346 | "Going to a Video Store" (Japanese: 憧れのマリーちゃんをレンタルするゾ) | January 28, 2000 |
| 346 | "I'm a Doctor Today" (Japanese: 風邪引き父ちゃんを元気にするゾ) | January 28, 2000 |
Shin-chan takes up the responsibility of savings. But he quits it the same day for a new Action Mask set. / Kazama visits the video store to return the Magical Mari's video. But he hesitates to return it due to his friends. / Hiroshi scolds the children as they trouble him while he suffers from fever. But he gets sick worried for them.
| 347 | "I Will Show Ai-chan My Talent" (Japanese: オラに燃えてるあいちゃんだゾ) | February 4, 2000 |
| 347 | "Me and Dad are Going to the Supermarket" (Japanese: スーパーマーケットは男の戦場だゾ) | February 4, 2000 |
| 347 | "Shiro Has a New Friend" (Japanese: 誰も知らないシロの秘密だゾ) | February 4, 2000 |
Ai-chan puts on makeup to impress Shin-chan. But Shin-chan proves to be a better makeup artist. / A young girl urges Hiroshi to buy a knife at the supermarket. Hiroshi spends all the money on the knife and returns home without any food items. / Shiro, in the Nohara family's absence, makes a new friend. He visits her daily to relish dog food and enjoy a good treatment.
| 348 | "Watching TV Will Lead Me and Dad into Trouble" (Japanese: 魔女っ子マリーちゃん 最大の危機だゾ) | February 11, 2000 |
| 348 | "Will I Get to Eat the Yakiimo Brought By Mom?" (Japanese: ストーブから目をはなすなだゾ) | February 11, 2000 |
| 348 | "We Will Follow Kazama" (Japanese: 怪しい風間君を大追跡だゾ) | February 11, 2000 |
Shin-chan and Hiroshi watch Magical Mari's show on TV and get inspired to draw on Misae's face. Misae gets angry at Hiroshi and Shin-chan. / Shin-chan, in spite of Misae's warning, touches the sweet potatoes and creates a mess in the house. / Ryuko and Kazama visit a bookstore to get Magical Mari's magazine. Nene-chan, Shin-chan and Ryuko's team members follow them.
| 349 | "A Child Climbed the Tree" (Japanese: 上尾先生の嫌いなアイツだゾ) | February 18, 2000 |
| 349 | "Putting a Lot of Efforts for Action Mask Chewing Gum" (Japanese: フーセンガムがどうしても食べたいゾ) | February 18, 2000 |
| 349 | "Dad Gives Us a Surprise" (Japanese: 父ちゃんのキケンな秘密だゾ) | February 18, 2000 |
Masumi gets afraid of Ai-chan's bodyguard, Kuroiso. She helps him with first aid. In return, Kuroiso promises to help her. / Misae brings Action Mask's chewing gum for herself. But Shin-chan pleads and convinces Misae to let him eat it. / Hiroshi gives Misae and Hiroshi a shock by wearing a women's attire. And Himawari fails to recognise Hiroshi.
| 350 | "Me and Dad are Going to a Barber" (Japanese: オラも美容院に行きたいゾ) | March 3, 2000 |
| 350 | "Himawari is Daydreaming" (Japanese: ひまわりの様子がヘン!?だゾ) | March 3, 2000 |
| 350 | "Me and Dad are Going Out for Dinner" (Japanese: 男だけのゴーカな夕食だゾ) | March 3, 2000 |
Hiroshi and Shin-chan visit a salon. Hiroshi gets a different haircut from Karizma, a hairstylist. / Himawari begins daydreaming after seeing a young boy and goes into depression. But on visiting a handsome doctor, she feels better. / Hiroshi takes Shin-chan for dinner to spend the lottery money. But he realises that Misae has withdrawn the money from his wallet.
| 351 | "A Party in My House" (Japanese: オラんちで大人のパーティーだゾ) | March 10, 2000 |
| 351 | "I Will Give an Audition Today" (Japanese: オラもオーディションを受けるゾ) | March 10, 2000 |
| 351 | "Dad Wins a Lottery" (Japanese: 宝くじが当たったゾ) | March 10, 2000 |
Shin-chan organises a party at his place for all his friends. Shin-chan's friends come well dressed and enjoy the celebration. / Shin-chan and his friends give an audition for show. Masao gets selected for the role. He freezes at the time of the shoot. / Hiroshi wins a lottery. After much discussion, Misae and Hiroshi decide to invest in Shin-chan and Himawari's name.
| 352 | "I'm Coming Action Mask" (Japanese: ファミレスにアクション仮面参上だゾ) | March 17, 2000 |
| 352 | "Mom is Preparing for My School Function / Mom Will Visit My School" (Japanese: オラもドキドキの保育参観だゾ) | March 17, 2000 |
Shin-chan forgets about Action Mask show on TV. He visits the restaurant with his family and feels sorry for missing the show. / Misae gets busy in preparing for the Parents Visitation Day at Shin-chan's school. She buys expensive clothes for herself and cooks a meal for Shin-chan. / Misae and all other student's moms visit the school for a Parents Visitation Day. Shin-chan taunts at Misae regarding the food. But Misae keeps calm.
| 353 | "I Will Eat Out Today" (Japanese: お昼ごはんはお弁当に限るゾ) | April 14, 2000 |
| 353 | "I will Watch Action Mask Movie" (Japanese: アクション仮面の映画が来るゾ) | April 14, 2000 |
| 353 | "We are Going on a Trip" (Japanese: 会社の保養所は楽しいゾ) | April 14, 2000 |
Shin-chan relishes the chicken lunch box at a local eatery. He recommends a customer and increases the eatery's business. / Shin-chan gets excited to watch Action Mask movie. He makes the arrangements and convinces Misae to take him to the movie hall. / Hiroshi and his family visit the company's health club. Shin-chan has a frank conversation with Hiroshi's boss and changes his mood.
| SPECIAL–25 | "Buriburizaemon’s Adventure Gold Finger Gin-chan" (Japanese: ぶりぶりざえもんの冒険 ゴールドフィンガー銀ちゃん) | April 21, 2000 |
| SPECIAL–25 | "An Action Mask gift (1998) <R>" (Japanese: アクション仮面のプレゼントだゾ（1998年）〈再〉) | April 21, 2000 |
| 354 | "We Are Planning to Build a House" (Japanese: お家を建てる準備だゾ) | April 28, 2000 |
| 354 | "Daddy is Very Unlucky" (Japanese: 父ちゃん大ピンチだゾ) | April 28, 2000 |
| 354 | "The jungle that calls the storm is open to the public" (Japanese: 嵐を呼ぶジャングル公開中だゾ) | April 28, 2000 |
| 355 | "Eating Snacks Secretly" (Japanese: おやつはナイショがおいしいゾ) | May 5, 2000 |
| 355 | "Dad and I Will Play Action Mask" (Japanese: アクション仮面対父ちゃんだゾ) | May 5, 2000 |
| 355 | "I Found a Cell Phone in the Park" (Japanese: ケータイ電話を拾ったゾ) | May 5, 2000 |
Himawari, Misae and Shin-chan secretly target the snacks. But amongst them, only Misae gets a chance to eat a cake. / Shin-chan wakes Hiroshi and plays the Action Mask game with him. Shin-chan and Hiroshi do Action Mask's stunts. / Shin-chan finds a cell phone in the park and creates a misunderstanding between the hairstylist and his two female customers.
| 356 | "Ai-chan Pays a Visit" (Japanese: あいちゃんが来る!!だゾ) | May 12, 2000 |
| 356 | "A Samurai's Story" (Japanese: 大型時代劇スペシャル!春日部黄門) | May 12, 2000 |
| 356 | "Dad and I Will Do the Housework" (Japanese: 母ちゃんの手になって働くゾ) | May 12, 2000 |
Ai-chan comes to Shin-chan's house to play with him. She brings flowers for Misae and invites a chef to prepare snacks. / Few goons trouble Nene-chan and her father, the principal. But Nanako and Shinobu fight the goons with their strength. / Misae gets pain in her hands. So, she hands over the housework to Hiroshi and Shin-chan.
| 357 | "What is Masao so Afraid of?" (Japanese: 真昼のホラー体験だゾ) | May 19, 2000 |
| 357 | "A Samurai's Story" (Japanese: 大河時代劇スペシャル!春日部黄門2) | May 19, 2000 |
| 357 | "I Want Action Mask Shoes" (Japanese: アクション仮面シューズがほしいゾ) | May 19, 2000 |
Masao and his friends watch a horror show on TV. And when they see a blanket shaped like a scary face, Masao get petrified. / Shin-chan, Kazama and Masao get on a mission to save the community from two leaders and their partner Buriburizaemon. / Shin-chan walks miles to wear off his old shoes and buy new Action Mask shoes. And much to his surprise, Misae brings new shoes for him.
| 358 | "I will return to my Parents’ house" | May 26, 2000 |
| 359 | "I shall Stay Alone" (Japanese: 一人暮らしするゾ) | June 2, 2000 |
| 359 | "I Will Teach Everyone Good Habits" (Japanese: 正義のヒーローお利口マン登場だゾ) | June 2, 2000 |
| 359 | "I Want a Hamster" (Japanese: ハムスターはオラが飼うゾ) | June 2, 2000 |
Shin-chan moves to the second floor to stay alone. But he apologises to Misae and returns to use the washroom. / Shin-chan observes some women in the train and raises his voice against their habits. But he fails to practice what he preaches. / Shin-chan brings home a hamster. As Misae refuses to let him keep it. In the end, Micchi and Yoshirin adopt it.
| 360 | "Why is Mom Angry?" (Japanese: おしおきから脱出するゾ) | June 9, 2000 |
| 360 | "A Burglar in Our House / A Detective in Our House" (Japanese: 空き巣に入られたゾ) | June 9, 2000 |
Misae gets angry at Shin-chan for eating Himawari's candies. But in fact, Hiroshi is the one who eats the candies. / Hiroshi and Misae get staggered when they find their things scattered and belongings missing from the house. The thief(?) tries to escape, but he faces Shin-chan. / The Nohara family invites the thief for investigation. The thief helps the family find their personal belongings and savings.
| 361 | "Will a New Member Join Kasukabe Defence Force" (Japanese: かすかべ防衛隊にあいちゃんが入ったゾ) | June 16, 2000 |
| 361 | "Uncle, You Should Not Do This" (Japanese: 再びお利口マンだゾ) | June 16, 2000 |
| 361 | "Dad Has No Rest Even On a Sunday" (Japanese: 父ちゃんは日曜も大変だゾ) | June 16, 2000 |
Ai-chan introduces her customised van and costumes to the Kasukabe Defence Force. But the group returns to their secret base. / Shin-chan brings out the hero within him and confronts the man causing inconvenience. But Shin-chan fails to follow his own words. / Hiroshi pretends to have back pain to escape the housework. Shin-chan's mischief makes Hiroshi sick for real.
| 362 | "Miss Yoshinaga is Sick" (Japanese: よしなが先生のお見舞いにいくゾ) | June 23, 2000 |
| 362 | "I Will Meet the Saint" (Japanese: お利口マン仙人登場だゾ) | June 23, 2000 |
| 362 | "Miss Yoshinaga is Leaving Us" (Japanese: よしなが先生辞めちゃダメだゾ) | June 23, 2000 |
Shin-chan and Masumi visit Yoshinaga as she is sick. Shin-chan stresses Yoshinaga to the extent of admitting her in the hospital. / Shin-chan reveals his special powers to a group of children. But the Saint descends to earth and erases the children's memory. / Shin-chan misunderstands Yoshinaga and Ishizaka's conversation. He and his friends travel to another city to meet Ishizaka.
| 363 | "Arguments About the Wedding Day" (Japanese: よしなが先生の結婚式が決まったゾ) | July 7, 2000 |
| 363 | "Preparations for Miss Yoshinaga's Wedding Day" (Japanese: 結婚式の出し物を決めるゾ) | July 7, 2000 |
| 363 | "Nanako and Me Will Participate in a Fancy Dress" (Japanese: オラのおよめさんはどんな人?だゾ) | July 7, 2000 |
Shin-chan and Misae intrude into Yoshinaga and Ishizaka's argument about the wedding preparations and bring them to a conclusion. / The principal, teachers and the school children begin with Yoshinaga's wedding preparation. The children practice an act. / Shin-chan dreams about Nanako and himself participating in the fancy dress competition.
| 364 | "Miss Yoshinaga Has Doubts About the Wedding" (Japanese: よしなが先生結婚を迷うゾ) | July 14, 2000 |
| 364 | "Today is the Wedding" (Japanese: 今日は結婚式だゾ) | July 14, 2000 |
| 364 | "Miss Yoshinaga Lives Like a Married Woman" (Japanese: よしなが先生の新婚家庭だゾ) | July 14, 2000 |
Yoshinaga starts stressing about getting married, as Shin-chan annoys her, she refuses to marry Ishizaka in anger. Later they make up / It begins raining on the day of Yoshinaga and Ishizaka's wedding. Ishizaka kisses Yoshinaga and declares her his wife. / Yoshinaga expresses happiness towards her new life. But, Shin-chan and his friends search for her new house and annoy her.
| 365 | "Will Dad and Me Record a Video of Yoshirin?" (Japanese: おもしろビデオを作るゾ) | July 21, 2000 |
| 365 | "Will Our Dreams Come True?" (Japanese: 幸せのクサヤの干物だゾ) | July 21, 2000 |
| 365 | "Where Did Miss Yoshinaga's Post Card Disappear?" (Japanese: 大事な書類がなくなったゾ) | July 21, 2000 |
Hiroshi and Shin-chan set a trap for Micchi and Yoshirin to record a video of them. But Misae falls into the trap. / Shin-chan and his parents sell dry fish to survive. The people praise the family's fish business and carve their statue in the centre of the street. / Yoshinaga fails to find her postcard concerning her passport. But, the postcard turned into a paper plane lands in the staff room.
| 366 | "I Will Learn to Surf / Norio's Surfing Story / Overcome Your Fears" | July 28, 2000 |
The Nohara family goes on a beach for a holiday. Shin-chan takes surfing lessons from a young lady. / A man named Norio shares his story related to surfing. Hiroshi, on the other hand, takes surfing lessons from a man. / Shin-chan's trainer and Norio, a surfer, meet after ten years. Norio fights his fear of huge waves and saves Himawari from drowning.
| 367 | "I Saw a Weird Dream" (Japanese: 縮みゆくしんのすけ) | August 4, 2000 |
| 367 | "I Will Meet My Twin" (Japanese: オラとオラの対決だゾ) | August 4, 2000 |
| 367 | "Who is This New Person?" (Japanese: 知らない誰かがいるゾ) | August 4, 2000 |
In his dream, Shin-chan finds himself small as a bee. Himawari swallows Shin-chan. Shin-chan wakes up and realises that he is safe. / Misae requests Shin-chan to complete the housework. Shin-chan's twin from the mirror completes the task and enjoys a reward. / A young boy, who is a ghost, joins Shin-chan and his friends in games and also eats Masao's share of the pudding.
| 368 | "I Will Play Sugoroku" (Japanese: 双六やるゾ) | August 11, 2000 |
| 368 | "Dinner Smells Good" (Japanese: 晩ご飯のおいしい匂いだゾ) | August 11, 2000 |
| 368 | "Who Will Win? Mom Or Me" (Japanese: 母ちゃんの手抜きには負けないゾ) | August 11, 2000 |
Shin-chan feels bored. So, he plays sugoroku with his toys and Himawari. As he loses, he tries his luck against Shiro. / Shin-chan and his friends get attracted by the smell of the food made in Nene-chan's house. But they refuse to eat the unusual dish. / In Hiroshi's absence, Misae focuses on savings. But, Shin-chan compels Misae to take him to a sushi restaurant.
| 369 | "Getting Over the Hot Summer" (Japanese: 暑さを忘れちゃうゾ) | August 18, 2000 |
| 369 | "Who Amongst Mom and Dad Will Win?" (Japanese: 父ちゃん母ちゃん真夏日の勝負だゾ) | August 18, 2000 |
| 369 | "Micchi is Unwell" (Japanese: 暑い夏をのりきるゾ) | August 18, 2000 |
On a hot day, Shin-chan and Shiro enjoy the cooling of the fridge. Misae gives Shin-chan a beating for keeping the refrigerator open. / As the temperatures rise and the electricity bills increase, Hiroshi and Misae get into a competition of staying without the AC. / Yoshirin gets worried about Micchi's health and rushes to Hiroshi for help. Later, Micchi rushes to Hiroshi when Yoshirin feels unwell.
| 370 | "If I Was Shiro" (Japanese: シロがオラだっただゾ) | August 25, 2000 |
| 370 | "Nanako At My Place" (Japanese: なな子おねいさんと二人きりだゾ) | August 25, 2000 |
| 370 | "What is Wrong With Nene-chan?" (Japanese: ネネちゃんが恋をしたゾ) | August 25, 2000 |
Shiro imagines being Shin-chan and Shin-chan as Shiro. But Shiro regrets being Shin-chan and stops his imagination. / Nanako visits Shin-chan and Himawari as their babysitter in Misae's absence. Both the children fight to stay close to Nanako. / Nene-chan collides with a young boy. She gets impressed by the boy's caring nature and gives the boy flowers.
| 371 | "The Jailhouse Story" (Japanese: 監獄しんちゃんだゾ) | September 1, 2000 |
| 371 | "My Onigiri is Delicious" (Japanese: オラのおにぎりはおいしいゾ) | September 1, 2000 |
| 371 | "Being Patient is Fruitful" (Japanese: 行列の先にはいいことあるゾ) | September 1, 2000 |
In a jailhouse story, prisoners Shin-chan and Hiroshi make an escape plan. But they stay back to eat dinner. / Shin-chan prepares a rice ball in Misae's absence. Misae returns home and eats the rice ball and leaves Shin-chan stunned. / The Nohara family waits for three days in a long queue to enter the aquarium. On entering, they win a trip to Australia.
| 372 | "On a Flight to Australia / I Gave Miss Yoshinaga a Surprise / We Are On an Australia Tour" (Japanese: オーストラリアは盛り上がるゾ) | September 8, 2000 |
While Yoshinaga gets excited about her honeymoon, the Nohara family also board the same flight and make Yoshinaga nervous. / Yoshinaga tries hard to avoid Ishizaka's meet with the Nohara family, who coincidentally stay in the same hotel. But, Shin-chan meets Ishizaka. / Ishizaka assures Yoshinaga of maintaining distance with the Nohara family.
| 373 | "Snorkelling is Fun / Mountain Climbing With Risk" (Japanese: オラ達もオーストラリアだゾ) | September 15, 2000 |
The Nohara family joins Ishizaka and Yoshinaga in snorkelling. The instructor gets annoyed and tired due to Shin-chan's mischief. / The Nohara family also joins Ishizaka and Yoshinaga in mountain climbing. The family barely avoids a falling into a cliff.
| SPECIAL–26 | "Treasure hunter Misae" (Japanese: トレジャーハンターみさえ) | September 29, 2000 |
| SPECIAL–26 | "Delivering Dad’s forgotten things (1997) <R>" (Japanese: 父ちゃんの忘れ物をお届けするゾ（1997年）〈再〉) | September 29, 2000 |
| SPECIAL–26 | "Delivered on the train" (Japanese: 電車に乗ってお届けするゾ（1997年）〈再〉) | September 29, 2000 |
| SPECIAL–26 | "I got lost in the middle of delivery" (Japanese: お届け途中で迷子になったゾ（1997年）〈再〉) | September 29, 2000 |
| 374 | "The Futaba Angels" (Japanese: フタバエンジェル) | October 20, 2000 |
| 374 | "I Want to Get an Allowance" (Japanese: おこづかいをもらいたいゾ) | October 20, 2000 |
| 374 | "Dad Wants an Allowance Too" (Japanese: 父ちゃんもおこづかいが欲しいゾ) | October 20, 2000 |
The principal introduces his Futaba Angels, Masumi, Yoshinaga and Matsuzaka, who protect the children from danger. / Shin-chan protests against Misae and even blackmails her to give him his allowance. As Misae refuses, Shin-chan gives up and mourns his defeat. / Hiroshi and Shin-chan join forces to get allowance from Misae. Hiroshi forgets Shin-chan after Misae increases his allowance.
| 375 | "Dad’s Golf Plans / Picnic on the Golf Course" (Japanese: 素敵なピクニックにお出かけだゾ) | October 27, 2000 |
Hiroshi decides to attend a golf match instead of a picnic with his family. Misae gets angry and adds 10 kilos of weight in the golf kit. / Misae takes the children to a picnic and unknowingly lands at the golf course. But, Hiroshi's boss allows Hiroshi to join his family for the picnic.
| 376 | "Kazama’s Nightmare" (Japanese: オラ達ナマケモノだゾ) | November 3, 2000 |
| 376 | "Mom Wants a New Cycle" (Japanese: 電動自転車が欲しいゾ) | November 3, 2000 |
| 376 | "Our Bicycle Has Been Stolen" (Japanese: 泥棒にはご用心だゾ) | November 3, 2000 |
Kazama and his friends laze on a branch of a tree. Kazama gets frustrated and realises that it was a dream. / Misae requests Hiroshi to get her a new electric cycle. Hiroshi realises Misae's need and buys a new cycle. / Hiroshi and his family think that someone has stolen their bicycle. But, in fact, the municipal officer tows the bicycle.
| 377 | "Fight Principal-Man! Act 1" (Japanese: 戦えエンチョーマン! ACT1) | November 10, 2000 |
| 377 | "Teacher Yoshinaga's Married Life" (Japanese: よしなが先生の新婚生活だゾ) | November 10, 2000 |
| 377 | "Making a Lovely Album" (Japanese: 素敵なアルバムの作り方だゾ) | November 10, 2000 |
Encho-man, who is none other than the principal, works towards the welfare of humanity. Shin-chan also joins the principal as Shincho-man whereas Matsuzaka turns into Tiger-woman and joins the force. / Yoshinaga gets upset at the children and the teachers as they enact her married life. She decides that she will not invite anyone to her house as she wants to spend her time with her husband. / Misae, Hiroshi and Shin-chan find the old photographs to create a photo album. Shin-chan opens the door and the wind blows away all the pictures, ruining their efforts.
| 378 | "Fight Principal-Man! Act 2" (Japanese: 戦えエンチョーマン! ACT2) | November 17, 2000 |
| 378 | "Mom is Forced to Return the Things" (Japanese: 借りたら返すはジョーシキだゾ) | November 17, 2000 |
| 378 | "What are Mom and Dad Secretly Talking?" (Japanese: 父ちゃん母ちゃんのナイショ話だゾ) | November 17, 2000 |
??? / Okei tells Misae to return all the belongings that she had borrowed earlier. Later, Okei borrows Misae's cycle. / Misae gets upset by a supermarket salesman's gesture. She secretly tries to tell Hiroshi about it so that the complaint doesn't hamper her children's mind.
| 379 | "Petit Petit Himawari" (Japanese: プッチプチひまわり) | November 24, 2000 |
| 379 | "My Friendship With Masao" (Japanese: マサオくん結婚を申し込むゾ) | November 24, 2000 |
| 379 | "Mom has a Good Mood Today" (Japanese: いいことありそうな一日だゾ) | November 24, 2000 |
?? / Masao misunderstands Shin-chan and Ai-chan’s conversation and challenges Shin-chan for a fight. But, Shin-chan refuses to fight Masao and befriends him. / Misae, in a good mood, pampers her family. But, Shin-chan and Himawari’s mischief changes Misae’s mood once again.
| 380 | "Fight Principal-Man! Act 3" (Japanese: 戦えエンチョーマン! ACT3) | December 1, 2000 |
| 380 | "The Quest For a Kappa" (Japanese: カッパ探しに出動だゾ) | December 1, 2000 |
| 380 | "Mom's Medical Checkup" (Japanese: 母ちゃんの健康が心配だゾ) | December 1, 2000 |
?? / The Kasukabe Defence Force begin the quest for a Kappa, a tortoise-shaped creature. Ai-chan and her bodyguard also join them. / Shin-chan and Himawari accompany Misae for a free medical checkup. As the doctor is new, he gets nervous and pokes the syringe into the wrong place.
| 381 | "Fight Principal-Man! Act 4" (Japanese: 戦えエンチョーマン! ACT4) | December 8, 2000 |
| 381 | "Mom and I Will Play Cards" (Japanese: ババ抜きだゾ) | December 8, 2000 |
| 381 | "I Will Drink a Lot of Milk" (Japanese: 牛乳10本を飲むゾ) | December 8, 2000 |
?? / Misae and Shin-chan play the card game. Shin-chan attempts the riffle card shuffle and tears the joker. / Misae brings home boxes of milk that were given by the principal for free. The family utilises the milk in every possible manner.
| 382 | "Petit Petit Himawari 2" (Japanese: プッチプチひまわり2) | December 15, 2000 |
| 382 | "Who Met Miss Matsuzaka?" (Japanese: 恋のベテランまつざか先生だゾ) | December 15, 2000 |
| 382 | "A Competition Between Mom and Dad" (Japanese: 吹き矢で真剣勝負だゾ) | December 15, 2000 |
?? / Matsuzaka assumes Ai-chan’s bodyguard to be her old friend and tries talking to him. She meets him and realises that he is not the one. / In a dart game competition between Misae and Hiroshi, Misae wins. Hiroshi imagines his life as a monkey after retirement.

== 2001 ==
| No. | Title | Original release date |
|---|---|---|
| SPECIAL–27 | "Large era special! Kasukabe advisor (2000) <R>" (Japanese: 大型時代劇スペシャル!春日部黄門（2000年）〈再〉) | January 5, 2001 |
| SPECIAL–27 | "Octopus is difficult to raise (1999) <R>" (Japanese: たこ上げはむずかしいゾ（1999年）〈再〉) | January 5, 2001 |
| SPECIAL–27 | "Action Mask Special (1992) <R>" (Japanese: アクション仮面スペシャルだゾ（1992年）〈再〉) | January 5, 2001 |
| SPECIAL–27 | "Esper brothers and sisters The first decisive battle of this century!" (Japanese: エスパー兄妹 今世紀最初の決戦!) | January 5, 2001 |
| 383 | "One night on Monkey Mountain" (Japanese: 猿山の一夜) | January 12, 2001 |
| 383 | "I'm Going to Yoshinaga's House" (Japanese: 新婚家庭に潜入だゾ) | January 12, 2001 |
| 383 | "I Will Wash the Utensils Today" (Japanese: 皿洗いならまかせとけだゾ) | January 12, 2001 |
?? / Shin-chan barges into Ishizaka and Yoshinaga’s house. After Yoshinaga convinces Shin-chan to leave, Masao, Nene-chan and Bo-chan enter. / Shin-chan washes the utensils on Misae’s insistence. However, he doesn’t let his family use those utensils.
| 384 | "Petit Petit Himawari 3" (Japanese: プッチプチひまわり3) | January 19, 2001 |
| 384 | "Dad’s Secret Shopping" (Japanese: 父ちゃんのナイショの買い物だゾ) | January 19, 2001 |
| 384 | "Mom’s life" (Japanese: 母ちゃんのナイショの生活だゾ) | January 19, 2001 |
?? / Hiroshi secretly goes to the store to buy a golf club. Misae finds out about Hiroshi's savings and utilises the money at a restaurant. / ??
| 385 | "Tonight is Sukiyaki night!" (Japanese: 今夜はすき焼きだゾ) | January 26, 2001 |
| 385 | "A Lot of Money in Our House" (Japanese: 節約はオラにおまかせだゾ) | January 26, 2001 |
| 385 | "You’ll Repent If You Get Late" (Japanese: 遅刻は許さないゾ) | January 26, 2001 |
?? / Misae doesn't find her wallet. Shin-chan checks the kitchen cabinet and finds Misae's wallet and an envelope full of money. / The children decide that whosoever gets late will be restricted from talking. Shin-chan gets late and is forced to keep quiet.
| 386 | "I play volleyball" (Japanese: バレーボールやるゾ) | February 2, 2001 |
| 387 | "The sign is “he”" (Japanese: サインは「ヘ」だゾ) | February 9, 2001 |
| 388 | "Grandpa is Coming Home" (Japanese: じいちゃんと暮らすゾ) | February 23, 2001 |
| 388 | "A Debate With Grandpa" | February 23, 2001 |
| 388 | "Mom and Dad Wants Grandpa to Return" | February 23, 2001 |
Ginnosuke informs Misae of his coming. And the next moment, he scares Misae and Shin-chan with a mask. / Shin-chan and Ginnosuke have a debate in regards to eating beans with a raw egg. But, Hiroshi teaches changes everyone’s mindset. / Ginnosuke refuses to return home and makes an excuse to avoid the housework. Hence, Misae assigns him the responsibility of the children.
| 389 | "Spending Time with Grandpa" (Japanese: じいちゃんと一緒だゾ) | March 2, 2001 |
Shin-chan and his grandfather play the hide-and-seek game. But, Shin-chan gets distracted from the game. Meanwhile, Shin-chan's grandfather writes a letter expecting Misae, Shin-chan and Himawari to miss him. But, his expectations don't turn real.
| 390 | "A New Rabbit in Nene-chan's House" (Japanese: しあわせウサギ物語) | March 9, 2001 |
| 390 | "Nene-chan and her Mother's Promise" (Japanese: ネネちゃん家のウサギはかわいそうだゾ) | March 9, 2001 |
| 390 | "What is Miss Ageo Making?" (Japanese: 上尾先生のひみつをさぐるゾ) | March 9, 2001 |
Nene-chan and her mother bring a new rabbit soft toy. Nene-chan’s mother beats up the rabbit when Shin-chan eats their jelly. / Nene-chan and her mother promise that they will not vent their anger on the rabbit. But, Shin-chan and Ai-chan induce them to beat up the rabbit. / Masumi knits a muffler for Kuroiso as the weather is cold. But, as Kuroiso speaks about summers, Masumi keeps the muffler to herself.
| 391 | "Who Will Eat These Radishes?" (Japanese: 大根がいっぱいだゾ) | March 16, 2001 |
| 391 | "Ai-chan is Coming to Meet Dad" (Japanese: 風間くんはひまわりにモテモテだゾ) | March 16, 2001 |
| 391 | "Where Did Kazama Lose his Bag?" (Japanese: 頭はつかうとよくなるゾ) | March 16, 2001 |
After Hiroshi and Shin-chan distribute radishes in the neighbourhood, Nanako and Shinobu bring a basket of radishes./ ?? / Where Did Kazama Lose his Bag?
| 392 | "Ai-chan is Coming to Meet Dad" (Japanese: あいの大作戦だゾ（父ちゃん編）) | April 13, 2001 |
| 392 | "I Have to Collect Stickers" (Japanese: シール集めでがんばるゾ) | April 13, 2001 |
Ai-chan blackmails her bodyguard and goes to meet Hiroshi. She sweet talks with Hiroshi and impresses him. / Shin-chan, to earn Action Mask’s electric belt, convinces the customers to purchase the spinach bread rolls and give him the stickers.
| SPECIAL–28 | "Pencil Shin-chan" (Japanese: エンピツしんちゃん) | April 20, 2001 |
| SPECIAL–28 | "History of the Nohara family" (Japanese: 野原家の歴史) | April 20, 2001 |
| 393 | "Ai-chan Will Visit Himawari" (Japanese: あいの大作戦だゾ（ひまわり編）) | April 27, 2001 |
| 393 | "Dad Visits My School" (Japanese: 父ちゃんが幼稚園に来たゾ) | April 27, 2001 |
Ai-chan, once again, blackmails her bodyguard and goes to meet Himawari. She gives Himawari her diamond and ruby bracelet and impresses her. / Hiroshi visits Shin-chan's school and impresses Yoshinaga and the students with his enthusiasm. However, Hiroshi returns home with a sprain in his back.
| 394 | "Bo-chan, a Great Detective" (Japanese: 名探偵ボーちゃんだゾ) | May 4, 2001 |
| 394 | "Nothing Can Be Found in the House" (Japanese: 探していると見つからないゾ) | May 4, 2001 |
Shin-chan and his friends start a detective agency and help Kawamura get in contact with a girl named Kara-chan. / On finding their lost things, the family blackmails each other. But eventually, they return the things to whom it belongs.
| 395 | "Investigate the behavior" (Japanese: オラの素行を調査だゾ) | May 11, 2001 |
| 395 | "The House is Suddenly in Trouble" (Japanese: 突然家が大変だゾ) | May 11, 2001 |
| 396 | "The house is gone" (Japanese: オラの家がなくなったゾ) | May 18, 2001 |
| 396 | "Looking for a New House" (Japanese: 新しい家を探すゾ) | May 18, 2001 |
?? / A gas explosion turns the Nohara family homeless. After a long hunt, Hiroshi decides to shift into a small house.
| 397 | "We're Moving Away" (Japanese: 引っ越しだゾ) | May 25, 2001 |
| 397 | "We Start a New Life" (Japanese: これから新しい生活だゾ) | May 25, 2001 |
The Nohara family shift into their new house. As the things are scattered, they have an argument in regards to the location of the things. / The family members spend the first night in their new house. Hiroshi tells Shin-chan a story, while Himawari sings a song to express happiness.
| 398 | "Waking Up in the New Apartment" (Japanese: アパートの朝だゾ) | June 1, 2001 |
| 398 | "Greeting the New Neighbors" (Japanese: 引っ越しの挨拶だゾ) | June 1, 2001 |
Shin-chan takes a leave from school. Instead of making things easy for Misae, Shin-chan scatters the boxes and plays. / Misae and Shin-chan meet their neighbour and give him a gift. The neighbour and the owner of the building get angry at Shin-chan for making noise.
| 399 | "Kazama is an Expert in Apologizing" (Japanese: 謝り上手な風間君だゾ) | June 8, 2001 |
| 399 | "How many People Live in Our Neighbourhood?" (Japanese: 隣は何をする人...ゾ) | June 8, 2001 |
Shin-chan's friends visit Shin-chan's new house. Kazama apologises to the owner and the neighbours for Shin-chan's mischief. / Hiroshi, Misae, and Shin-chan discuss their confusion related to their neighbour. They get shocked to see a lady dressed in different attires.
| 400 | "Prologue" (Japanese: プロローグ) | June 15, 2001 |
| 400 | "This Shortcut is Longer" (Japanese: 近道は遠い道だゾ) | June 15, 2001 |
Misae takes Shin-chan to school on the cycle. After facing challenges, Misae learns that the school had declared a half day. / While rushing to get the eggs on sale, a lady falls. And her baby slides. But, Misae saves the baby and also takes the eggs.
| 401 | "Our Dream House!" (Japanese: 夢の豪邸だゾ) | June 22, 2001 |
| 401 | "Do You Have a Part-time Job?" (Japanese: 内職はおいしいゾ) | June 22, 2001 |
Misae and Hiroshi draw their dream house. Misae sees a crockery rack on TV and purchases crockery set beforehand. / Misae takes up a job of packaging chocolates. However, due to the heat, the chocolates melt, and Misae loses her job.
| 402 | "We Have a Hotline to Our Neighbor" (Japanese: お隣りとつつぬけだゾ) | June 29, 2001 |
| 402 | "My Poor Dad" (Japanese: ギャルママみさえだゾ) | June 29, 2001 |
Yonro, the neighbour, gets angry at Shin-chan and gives a hard blow on the wall. Shin-chan forces himself into the wall and makes the hole big. / Misae doubts Hiroshi's intentions when she hears him talk to the neighbour. Later, Misae wears the Atsuko’s fancy stuff and changes her look.
| 403 | "I Love the Star Festival" (Japanese: 七夕飾りを作るゾ) | July 6, 2001 |
| 403 | "Why is the Rain Not Stopping?" (Japanese: 雨の日はイライラだゾ) | July 6, 2001 |
The children at school create decorative articles to put up on the tree for the Star Festival. / Misae gets angry at Hiroshi, Shin-chan and Misae for ruining her work. Due to the rains, the three of them go to the neighbour's house and play cards.
| 404 | "This Time It's a Fire" (Japanese: 今度は火事だゾ) | July 13, 2001 |
| 404 | "Masao Catches an Insect" (Japanese: クワガタ採りは大変だゾ) | July 13, 2001 |
Misae takes Himawari to the clinic for her vaccination. She hurriedly returns home to turn the gas knob off. / Two boys snatch Masao's rare insect. So, Bo-chan and the others work up a plan and take back the insect. But, Masao offers the insect to Ai-chan.
| 405 | "Playing the Hide-and-seek Game" (Japanese: おにごっこは女の勝負だゾ) | August 3, 2001 |
| 405 | "What Does Our Neighbour Want to Learn from Mom?" (Japanese: 母ちゃんは子育ての見本だゾ) | August 3, 2001 |
Shin-chan and his friends play the hide-and-seek game. Masao intentionally gets out so that Ai-chan doesn't play the denner. / Atsuko requests Misae to help her teach good values in her daughter, Atsumi. Misae agrees to help Atsuko.
| 406 | "Micchi and Yoshirin Visit Us" (Japanese: めいわく夫婦が来たゾ) | August 10, 2001 |
| 406 | "Cleaning the Webs" (Japanese: クモの巣を取るゾ) | August 10, 2001 |
Yoshirin and Micchi visit Hiroshi's house to resolve their fight regarding a doll and refuse to return home. / Misae becomes afraid of spiders and their webs. While cleaning them, she slips from the railing. The neighbour, dressed as a spider, saves Misae.
| 407 | "What Did Masao See?" (Japanese: マサオ君だけが見ていたゾ) | August 17, 2001 |
| 407 | "Doing a Lot of Shopping" (Japanese: ショッピングセンターで買い物だゾ) | August 17, 2001 |
Masao sees an injured lady outside Shin-chan's neighbour's apartment. He visits the same neighbour's house and gets unconscious. / Misae enters the supermarket with Himawari. Shin-chan and his friends also join her. Misae does goes shopping, but the children leave without helping her.
| 408 | "Meeting Nanako" (Japanese: 銭湯でさっぱりだゾ) | August 24, 2001 |
| 408 | "We’re Exchanging Diaries" (Japanese: 恐怖の交換日記だゾ) | August 24, 2001 |
Hiroshi and Shin-chan visit a public bathroom to take a bath. They meet Nanako and spend some more time there. / Shin-chan writes his diary and exchanges it with his friends. Misae prepares a lavish meal to create a good impression.
| 409 | "Shiro Comes Home" (Japanese: シロを連れてきちゃったゾ) | August 31, 2001 |
| 409 | "My Summer Holidays Have Ended" (Japanese: 夏の海に行きたいゾ) | August 31, 2001 |
Shin-chan brings Shiro home. As pets are not allowed, Shin-chan, Misae and Yonro make an excuse to keep Shiro in the apartment. / Hiroshi takes Shin-chan to the beach for a picnic. Shin-chan feels sad due to the offseason. But, Hiroshi makes him happy with fireworks.
| 410 | "Will These Two Be Sisters" (Japanese: 2人は最強の姉妹だゾ) | September 7, 2001 |
| 410 | "When Will the Rain Stop?" (Japanese: 雨漏りで大変だゾ) | September 7, 2001 |
Ai-chan sweet talks with Nene-chan and bonds with her as her sister. Shin-chan, Kazama, Bo-chan and Masao get surprised. / The heavy rain leads to leakages in the roof and power outage. Hence, the Nohara family spend their night at Yonro's house.
| 411 | "My Eyes Are Red" (Japanese: おメメが赤くなっちゃったゾ) | September 14, 2001 |
| 411 | "Exams Are Not Easy" (Japanese: 受験生は悩みが多いゾ) | September 14, 2001 |
Shin-chan’s eye turns red as he sleeps late in the night. Hiroshi takes Shin-chan to a female doctor, who pours eye drops in Shin-chan’s eye. / The Nohara family offers Yonro food and encourage him to decide about his life. Yonro brings a DVD of the people who achieved success in their life.
| 412 | "Speaking the Truth Isn't Tough" (Japanese: 食べちゃったので言えないゾ) | September 21, 2001 |
| 412 | "Whom Should I Play With?" (Japanese: ママゴトはトラブルのモトだゾ) | September 21, 2001 |
Shin-chan eats a packet of Action Mask chips in spite of Misae’s warning. Shin-chan gathers courage and speaks the truth to Misae. / Ai-chan and Nene-chan bribe Shin-chan to play with them. Eventually, the two girls get along and play together.
| SPECIAL–29 | "Shin-chan's a Wizard!" (Japanese: 魔法使いしんちゃんだゾ) | October 5, 2001 |
| SPECIAL–29 | "It’s hard to build a house" (Japanese: お家がなかなか建たないゾ) | October 5, 2001 |
| 413 | "A New Guest in Our House" (Japanese: アツミのプチ家出だゾ) | October 12, 2001 |
| 413 | "I'm Not Scared of Transforming" (Japanese: 変身すると怖くないゾ) | October 12, 2001 |
Atsumi moves into Misae's house as she is angry with her mother. But, Atsuko brings a new t-shirt for Atsumi and cheers her up. / In Misae's absence, Reyo looks after Himawari. Reyo enacts a criminal and scares Shin-chan.
| 414 | "Practising for Reyo’s Auditions" (Japanese: オーディションを応援するゾ) | October 19, 2001 |
| 414 | "Mom Suffers a Sprain in Her Back" (Japanese: ギックリ腰母ちゃんだゾ) | October 19, 2001 |
The Nohara family and Yonro help Reyo in practising the dialogues for her auditions. They console Reyo when she doesn't get through her auditions. / As Misae suffers a sprain in her back, Atsuko offers Misae help in the household chores.
| 415 | "How Do We Stop the leaves From Withering?" (Japanese: 園長先生が心配だゾ) | October 26, 2001 |
| 415 | "Mom is Suffering From Fever" (Japanese: 熱出し母ちゃんだゾ) | October 26, 2001 |
The principal feels disappointed to see his favourite tree withering. Shin-chan and his friends stick the leaves with gum to make the teacher happy. / Misae suffers from high fever. Hence, Shin-chan takes up the responsibility of the house. He completes the work and makes Misae proud.
| 416 | "Yoshinaga-sensei is the secret of the teacher" (Japanese: よしなが先生のヒミツだゾ) | November 2, 2001 |
| 416 | "Everyone loves natto" (Japanese: みんな納豆が大好きだゾ) | November 2, 2001 |
| 417 | "Looking for a little kindness" (Japanese: 小さな親切をお探しするゾ) | November 9, 2001 |
| 417 | "Dad isn’t attached" (Japanese: 父ちゃんはついてないゾ) | November 9, 2001 |
| 418 | "Ai-chan’s recital" (Japanese: あいちゃんの発表会だゾ) | November 16, 2001 |
| 418 | "A disappeared Shiro" (Japanese: 消えたシロだゾ) | November 16, 2001 |
| 419 | "Oh! The ranch is wide" (Japanese: オー!牧場は広いゾ) | November 23, 2001 |
| 420 | "Kazama-kun is in a big pinch" (Japanese: 風間くんが大ピンチだゾ) | November 30, 2001 |
| 420 | "Do-it-yourself carpenter" (Japanese: 日曜大工はとくいだゾ) | November 30, 2001 |
| 421 | "I don’t want to get out of the kotatsu" (Japanese: こたつから出たくないゾ) | December 7, 2001 |
| 421 | "I’m jogging even on a cold morning" (Japanese: 寒い朝でもジョギングだゾ) | December 7, 2001 |
| 422 | "Kazama-kun is an Adult!" (Japanese: 風間くんはオトナだゾ) | December 14, 2001 |
| 422 | "I also wears a kimono" (Japanese: オラも着物を着るゾ) | December 14, 2001 |
| SPECIAL–30 | "Crayon Wars (1997) <R>" (Japanese: クレヨンウォーズ（1997年）〈再〉) | December 21, 2001 |
| SPECIAL–30 | "The 5th family" (Japanese: 5人目の家族だゾ) | December 21, 2001 |
| SPECIAL–30 | "A big cleaning in the town" (Japanese: 町内の大掃除だゾ) | December 21, 2001 |
