= Amazon (Dragon's Crown) =

Fictional character in Dragon's Crown

- Dragon's Crown character
- The Amazon from Dragon's Crown
- First game: Dragon's Crown (2013)
- Created by: George Kamitani
- Designed by: George Kamitani "Shigatake" (animation)
- Voiced by: JA: Atsuko Tanaka

The Amazon (Japanese: アマゾン) is a character introduced in the 2013 side-scrolling beat 'em up roleplaying game Dragon's Crown, developed by Vanillaware. A tall blonde muscular woman specializing in melee attacks, she is intended to have low defense, but able to deal large amounts of damage. Created by George Kamitani, her animations for the game were done by illustrator Shigatake. She additionally appears in a manga novelization of the game, and in a comic series published in Famitsu. In Japanese the character is voiced by Atsuko Tanaka, while her English voice actress is uncredited.

Since her debut she has received mixed reception. Some felt her design was unnecessarily sexualized, and moreso that it hurt the game's presentation and felt at odds with attempts to address gender issues in the gaming industry. Others however praised her appearance, describing her as one of the most striking characters visually in the title and feeling that a depiction of a physically strong woman was a breath of fresh air. She has also been cited as an example of media attempts at creating an "Alpha Female" counterpart to the Alpha Male archetype, and the shortcomings in such a portrayal.

== Conception and design ==
Concept art from the 2008 Wii design document

Created by George Kamitani for the beat 'em up Dragon's Crown, influences for the Amazon and other characters came from basic design motifs of fantasy literature and gaming, such as his past work on Dungeons & Dragons: Tower of Doom, other games such as Sega's Golden Axe, and the literary works of J. R. R. Tolkien. He started with orthodox designs, feeling they were popular with Japanese audiences, but in order to stand out amongst other fantasy media in the market at the time he exaggerated the designs, to this end focusing on masculine or feminine traits to emphasize amongst the cast. Part of his aim was to "cartoonify" the character silhouettes, while also keeping them neutral enough for a Japanese market. While the game went through multiple iterations through its long development, the Amazon was included in the 2008 proposal document for developing the game on the Nintendo Wii.

The Amazon is a tall, muscular woman with long blonde hair. While in early concept art the character is shown to be in full armor with the exception of a thong covering her buttocks and exposed thighs, in the final it was simplified to black boots, black gloves, and a chainmail bikini. Her headdress was similarly changed from a feather arrangement on each side of her head to a just a pair of feathers sticking out of the right side of her hair. In addition, she has a bracelet on each bicep and a circlet across her brow, while her thighs are covered in a tattoo pattern. When designing the characters, Kamitani based the art style off of Western paintings, but this caused some complications when it came time to apply color palettes as the sprites were not designed for such. As a result, only the color of her hair and feathers change noticeably in game depending on selected palette.

While Kamitani designed the character's poses, she was animated by illustrator Shigatake. When developing them Shigatake wanted to emphasize her buttocks, particularly in her standing animation. He was also particular that her rear should sway during her walking animation, though a colleague on the team criticized the detail and argued "No one would notice that!"

== Appearances ==
As introduced in Vanillaware's 2013 video game Dragon's Crown, the Amazon is a playable character that acts as one of the game's character classes, allowing players to customize their name and choose one of several color palettes at the start of the game. An orphan adopted by a tribe of Amazons, she is one of several warriors attempting to save the country of Hydeland, and at the game's conclusion a noble family recognize her as their long-lost granddaughter. Additional downloadable content for the game added an option to change the game's narrator to one of the playable characters', including the Amazon's. In Japanese the character is voiced by Atsuko Tanaka, while her English voice actress is uncredited.

In terms of gameplay, the developers wanted her to be a low defense character that rewarded players for not getting hit, inspired by Muhammad Ali's "fight like a butterfly, sting like a bee" catchphrase. Focused on melee attacks and high movement speed, the character fights using either punches and kicks or two-handed weapons such as polearms. In addition the character can parry some melee attacks, giving them temporary invincibility, while if they hit enough enemies in succession without being struck they will enter a "Berserk" state. While Berserk, movement speed and attack speed will be increased as long as the player continuously attacks. Several individual abilities can also be activated separately, such as "Stun Wave", which is an area of effect attack that can hit multiple enemies, and "Lunatic", which allows her to instantly enter the Berserk state at the cost of some health.

In print media, the character is featured in a manga novelization of the game, written by Hironori Kato and overseen by Vanillaware's staff. In it, an Amazon named Sara partners with a wizard, Kreutz, and the events of the novel are intended as a side story to the game's narrative. The magazine Famitsu meanwhile featured her in a gag comic series to promote the game titled Dragon's Crown Play Comic: Deplorable! Amazon-chan. Written by Kohaku Sumeragi, it was originally showcased in issues of Weekly Famitsu, and later compiled into a book published by Kadokawa Corporation and Enterbrain.

== Promotion and merchandise ==
Several bits of merchandise featuring the Amazon have been released, including tapestries, cleaning cloths, card sleeves, and t-shirts. The character was also used to represent Dragon's Crown in promotional media for Vanillaware's celebration of their 20th anniversary, as well as a promotion between game publisher Atlus and cafe Rabbit Kitchen. Several figures of the Amazon have also been released, such as a 1/7th scale figure by Excellent Model, another figure by XPLUS, and another by Goodsmile as part of their Parfom line.

One figure in particular drew notable criticism, a 1/6th scale figure produced by model maker Beat. Featuring emphasized muscles and sharp angles, Jordan Devore stated that while it was over the top in a similar manner to the game, her in-game appearance "now looks respectable compared to what's happening here", and Steven Hansen of the same publication felt that more "fanservice-y models" were better by comparison. Others such as Chris Priestman of Siliconera felt it raised questions about how well the character's design translated to a 3D portrayal, a sentiment repeated by Casey Baseel of SoraNews24 who added that while she already felt the original in-game presentation was "awkward", the 3D model "hammers home how ridiculously ripped" she is.

== Critical reception ==
Upon her debut, the Amazon received mixed reception, with several outlets criticizing her design alongside that of the game's Sorceress character. Rus McLaughlin of VentureBeat stated that at the E3 presentation of the game, he felt their designs negatively impacted the title's appeal. Describing them as causing "great offense with their (to put it mildly) overtly sexualized designs", he further felt they represented at minimum a disconnect with attempts to address gender equality issues in the gaming industry. Jeremy Parish for USGamer offered similar sentiment, stating that while the design took inspiration from characters like Marvel Comics' Red Sonja and noting she was just as strong as the male characters, he felt it exaggerated "female sexuality to a nearly comical degree" and that her "over-the-top appearance and stark contrast" to the male cast led him to question why and if genre conventions justified that sort of treatment. Matt Sainsbury of DigitallyDownloaded.net stated that while the game drew from fantasy tropes and made the male characters "equally problematic", he felt the genre had evolved past such and further the designs of some of the other playable characters felt like "proof within Dragon's Crown itself that the Amazon didn't actually need to be near-naked".

Other outlets however viewed the subject differently. Kotaku's Luke Plunkett, upon noticing the North American Dragon's Crown website censored her legs, expressed confusion, stating that she was not "particularly sexual", and added that while she had a "bit of cleavage on show [...] if her cleavage is the first thing you notice, well, you're a perv. Because her cleavage is the smallest thing in that image". Chris Moyse of Destructoid praised her as one of the most striking and unique characters in the game, describing her as having "watermelon-popping thighs" and her appearance as combining "the awe-inspiring beauty of an fantasy princess with the body of 1999 Scott Steiner". Lauren Schumacher of Blast Magazine described her as a "revolutionary depiction of a physically strong female", feeling that while many depictions of strong women existed in media at the time, their strength by comparison was often portrayed as magical. Physically strong women by comparison were often depicted as "grotesque, freakish, and terrifying", and she felt a character that was strong while having "flowing hair, glowing skin, amble breasts and hips" was something that only "comes around only once in a great while, and she lingers in the public consciousness for many years afterwards".

Still others provided a neutral response. Damien McFerran of Push Square stated that while Kamitani's previous games had featured over-sexualized designs, he felt the Amazon's design was a "new level of absurdity", describing her as being "blessed with trunk-like thighs and a derrière so massive it presumably requires her to book two seats instead of one whenever she takes a horse-drawn carriage ride", but also argued that such designs were not presented as an ideal, but the developers instead having fun in referencing previous fantasy works. Jeff Grub for VentureBeat meanwhile said that while the character was a "travesty of mashed together body parts" particularly due to her "rippling abdomen muscles and tree-trunk-sized thighs" and "forearms like Popeye", after his initial reaction subsided he found the design "refreshing and interesting" and the antithesis of how women were typically portrayed in video games. Describing her as representing a typically male warrior class as a woman, he called her "strong and capable and frightening" in a positive manner and further expressed exhilaration at something that defied his expectations in video games at the time.

In broader study of character design, Luis de-Leon of Game Developer described the Amazon as a prominent example of the "Alpha Female" archetype game developers try to achieve when applying the Alpha Male archetype directly to a female character. He stated that such designs tend to focus on being "scientifically cool" and are often well received by male audiences, but felt due to being built around male emotional needs solely they were often seen poorly by female audiences for ignoring theirs.
