= Dragon's Crown =

2013 video game

- Developer: Vanillaware
- Publishers: JP: Atlus; NA: Atlus USA; PAL: NIS America
- Director: George Kamitani
- Producers: Katsura Hashino; Yousuke Uda
- Designer: Takehiro Shiga
- Programmer: Kentaro Ohnishi
- Artists: George Kamitani; Emika Kida
- Writers: George Kamitani; Wataru Nakanishi; Asahi Matsui
- Composer: Hitoshi Sakimoto
- Platforms: PlayStation 3 PlayStation Vita; PlayStation 4
- Release: PS3, Vita: JP: July 25, 2013; NA: August 6, 2013; AU: October 10, 2013; EU: October 11, 2013; PS4: JP: February 8, 2018; WW: May 15, 2018
- Genres: Action role-playing, beat 'em up
- Modes: Single-player, multiplayer

Dragon's Crown (Note: Doragonzu Kuraun (Japanese: ドラゴンズクラウン)) is a 2013 action role-playing game developed by Vanillaware for the PlayStation 3 and PlayStation Vita. The game was published in Japan and North America by Atlus and in PAL regions by NIS America. A high-definition port for PlayStation 4, Dragon's Crown Pro, was released by Atlus in 2018. Players navigate environments from a side-scrolling perspective, choosing from six character classes to fight in the style of a beat 'em up and acquiring loot through repeated dungeon exploration. The storyline follows adventurers as they journey across Hydeland and become involved in the search for the magical Dragon's Crown.

Director and lead artist George Kamitani originally planned Dragon's Crown as a Dreamcast sequel to the 1997 Sega Saturn title Princess Crown. Following Vanillaware's successes with Odin Sphere and Muramasa: The Demon Blade, Kamitani restarted the project. Originally set to be published by UTV Ignition Entertainment, that company's withdrawal from the gaming market led to Atlus taking up the project. Upon release, Dragon's Crown received positive reviews from critics, who praised its gameplay and art style, while the story and repetitive elements drew criticism. The game also generated controversy for its exaggerated character designs and sexualized female characters. It had sold over one million units by September 2017.

== Gameplay ==
A boss encounter from Dragon's Crown; a four-player party fight against a dragon.

Dragon's Crown is a two-dimensional (2D) side-scrolling action role-playing game in which players take on the role of an adventurer exploring dungeons in the kingdom of Hydeland. The adventurer's base is a town at the kingdom's heart. There players interact with different establishments populated by friendly non-player characters (NPCs); the Adventurers' Guild where quests are accepted and the player can unlock new Skills; Morgan's Magic Shop where equipment can be repaired and upgraded; Canaan Temple, where players can pay to resurrect bone piles found in dungeons and receive boons for dungeon runs; and Lucain's Tower, which documents rune magic unlocked by the player.

Outside of town, players can explore nine dungeon environments in the surrounding lands; each dungeon has two paths, one unlocked after the first run, and hidden areas. Dungeons are reached either through a magical portal called the Gate, or after a certain point using the stables for a fee. Players are always accompanied in dungeons by two NPCs; the thief Rannie who unlocks treasure chests and doors, and the fairy Tiki who helps point out hidden treasure. While exploring dungeons, players move constantly from left to right, battling both standard enemies and boss monsters at the end of each stage. All characters have the same basic moveset of attacking, dodging and jumping similar to classic beat 'em up games. During single-player, players can find bone piles in dungeons and pay to resurrect them in town, recruiting them as AI-controlled fighting companions. During exploration of some dungeons, players can pacify and mount larger animals with their own health and attacks.

After the first half of the game, players can continue onto a random dungeon after finishing a run, which triggers a cooking minigame where the player uses ingredients and seasoning to produce meals which increase a character's statistics. After completing each dungeon for the first time, a side quest is unlocked for that region. Some of these are key to reaching the final boss, with later boss battles including time limits players must beat to get the item needed to progress. Loot in the form of equipment and weapons is found in chests within the dungeons, and given a letter grading; gradings range from the highest "S" and then from "A" to the lowest "E". After returning to the town hub, players can spend gold to appraise the item, which gives it an altered selling value compared to its unappraised state. During dungeon runs, players can activate runes, magical abilities triggered using sequences of three symbols, up to two of which can be hidden in the local environment.

The adventurer is chosen from one of six character classes, separated by the skill level needed from players. The Knight for all players, the Amazon and Dwarf for players of average skill level, and the Elf, Wizard and Sorceress for players of high skill. The Knight is an armored melee fighter based around sword attacks. The Dwarf is similar, but with greater strength and more unarmed attack options. The Amazon is a complex melee class with low health, but strikes grow stronger and faster as she continues attacking. All melee-based classes can launch a powerful area of effect attack, losing their weapon for a short time. The high-speed Elf uses a mixture of archery and close-range melee attacks, replenishing her arrows by defeating enemies. The Wizard and Sorceress are both classes based around magical attacks powered by Mana, needing to replenish Mana by either using normal attacks or charging their Mana meter while stationary. All female classes (the Amazon, Elf and Sorceress) have a high luck statistic, giving players the chance of finding more valuable loot. Each character can unlock additional skills, divided into two skill tree types; general improvements, and class-specific skills.

Dragon's Crown supports co-op multiplayer; all versions have online multiplayer, but local co-op is exclusive to the home console versions. The online multiplayer is unlocked after players have completed the first half of the story campaign when the harder alternate dungeon routes are unlocked in-game. In addition to class-based difficulty modifiers, there are three difficulty settings. The player begins the game on normal difficulty, and after completing the main campaign the difficulty can be raised to "Hard". After a second run, the difficulty can be raised again to "Inferno". Each difficulty has a level cap, with Inferno difficulty maxing out at level 99, and the higher "Ultimate" difficulty maxing at level 255. After completing the game, a tenth procedurally generated dungeon called the Labyrinth of Chaos is unlocked. A player-versus-player battle arena can be unlocked, accommodating up to four players. An eleventh dungeon dubbed the Tower of Mirage is unlocked on the Ultimate difficulty setting, featuring a larger number of randomly generated areas and bosses.

== Synopsis ==
The adventurer arrives in Hydeland and gets involved with fights against surging monster attacks from ancient sites across the land, and a political coup attempted by the Prime Minister against the next heirs, siblings Vivian and Dean, following the disappearance of the king. The king killed himself to thwart a ritual by the malevolent Morneon religion to summon a powerful ancient dragon, sealed in the Illusionary Lands by the world's goddesses. Key to their plot is the Dragon's Crown, an artifact that was imbued with the power to control dragons. Following his ascension to the throne, Dean is sacrificed by Morneon, though the adventurer has already destroyed the existing magic to reach the Illusionary Lands. The adventurer finds nine talismans to enter the Illusionary Lands and slays the ancient dragon before it can break free. Vivian is made queen and inherits the now-powerless Dragon's Crown.

The goddesses, one of which was restored by the ancient dragon's defeat, then tasks the Adventurer with defeating two progressively stronger dragons which stole their power. Upon accomplishing these tasks, the restored goddesses declare the adventurer as the "Gate Guardian" for the Illusionary Lands, their name recorded in their mythology. Each character class also has a specific ending; the Sorceress briefly entertains the nobility before returning to an adventuring life, the Knight lives a long life full of adventure, the Elf returns to her homeland and is made Crown Regent for felling the dragon, the Dwarf leads his people into a new golden age, the Amazon is hailed by the people and recognised by a Hydeland noble family as their lost granddaughter, and the Wizard returns to undo a failed magic ritual he performed on his sister.

== Development ==
Dragon's Crown was originally designed by George Kamitani as a Dreamcast sequel to Princess Crown, a 1997 video game for the Sega Saturn which he directed. Due to its platform and publisher pressure, Dragon's Crown would have used 3D graphics. This earliest version was inspired by the Wizardry and Sorcerian series. Kamitani's aim was to recreate the gameplay experience of Capcom's Dungeons & Dragons: Tower of Doom, which he worked on. Due to the closure of the studio he was working at following the commercial failure of Princess Crown, the concept was scrapped. Kamitani later reused the female warrior concept art for his work on Fantasy Earth: The Ring of Dominion. Over the next decade, he pitched to several different publishers but was always turned down.

In 2009, after finishing Muramasa: The Demon Blade, Kamitani returned to the concept. As the original version had been a hard sell to publishers, he rewrote the pitch. Originally planned for the Wii, Kamitani presented it to Capcom. While initially well-received, Capcom's executives decided to pass on it as it would not sell the same numbers as Monster Hunter. The project was next pitched and eagerly picked up by UTV Ignition Entertainment. The original target platform for the game by this point was the Xbox platform, hoping for an international audience. It eventually settled onto PS3 and Vita. The Vita, with its PS3 crossplay functions, was chosen due to the success of the multiplayer-focused Monster Hunter series as UTV Ignition wanted a multiplayer experience. The original producer was UTV Ignition's Kashow Oda.

During 2011, UTV Ignition ran into financial trouble, pulling first from game development and then publishing. This meant funding for Dragon's Crown dried up, threatening its existence. Not wanting the game to be cancelled, Kamitani went to Atlus, who had previously published Vanillaware's first title Odin Sphere. As the project was well into development and had promise, Atlus agreed to take it, both becoming its publisher and lending development aid from its Persona series team. The game's new producers were Katsura Hashino and Yousuke Uda. This did not end the game's production troubles, as it was further threatened in 2013 with the bankruptcy of Atlus's parent company Index Corporation. Dragon's Crown had Vanillaware's longest development cycle at the time of four years, and was its most expensive with a budget of over ¥100 million (over US$1,000,000). It was also their first title designed for high-definition consoles. The team put a large amount of effort into development, which left them no resources to aid in the localization of their previous title Grand Knights History. This led to its planned Western release being cancelled. Kamitani described the production as being "full of twists and turns".

Kamitani credited programmer Kentaro Ohnishi for steering the game into becoming a beat 'em up, something Vanillaware had never done before. He also asked veterans of those days the games they best remembered for inspiration, and typically they recalled Capcom and Sega's arcade titles of the time with fondness. Ohnishi created the skill system design. Kamitani included elements from games that he enjoyed. He drew direct inspiration from Dungeons & Dragons: Tower of Doom, Golden Axe and The King of Dragons. He also cited Dungeon Master, the Wizardry and Sorcerian series. The loot system and its surrounding mechanics were suggested by Ohnishi, based on those in Diablo. Random dungeon generation similar to Diablo was dropped early in development so players could enjoy memorising and mastering each dungeon. The increased difficulty options were incorporated based on Ignition's request for elements that would appeal to the Western market. Ohnishi described getting the online components to work as his biggest challenge.

=== Scenario and art design ===
While the framework of the game survived from its days as a Dreamcast title, almost everything else was changed. Unlike previous Vanillaware titles, emphasis was placed on gameplay rather than story. As opposed to the multiple interwoven narratives of Odin Sphere and Muramasa, while there were several ancillary story threads, they all served a single narrative. Nevertheless, the total story content was greater than that of Muramasa. Kamitani put in everything he possibly could into the game rather than leaving anything for a potential sequel, as he was averse to sequels on principle. The earliest plan was for only a town and dungeon environments like the Wizardry series, but the background art team created exterior landscape designs and thus expanded the game's visual scope. This also resulted in the initial design plan being changed to reflect the new environments. Early plans for expansion packs themed after ancient Egypt and the Sengoku period were abandoned due to the extra workload.

Kamitani was in charge of character designs, and also drew most of the background art and full-motion illustrations. Additional artwork was created by Emika Kida. During Kamitani's earliest role-playing concept, he drew on Western art for inspiration. His first experiment with this style was a 2010 New Year illustration of the game's goddesses. After positive responses, he went with this style. Kamitani's artwork for Dragon's Crown drew heavy inspiration from the work of Frank Frazetta. While he incorporated standard fantasy visual elements found in Dungeons & Dragons and The Lord of the Rings, he wanted to give them a unique spin. To do this, he created exaggerated body designs for men, women and monsters; each had their defining characteristics magnified "from different angles", with Kamitani noting that the designs were not intended to be taken seriously.

As with Vanillaware's other titles, the game used 2D artwork. Kamitani continued to be influenced in his art design work by Akira Yasuda, a Capcom artist who worked on several of the company's most iconic fighting games. While the art style mimicked classic 2D arcade titles from Capcom, Vanillaware's style of animated illustrations was more difficult to manage, particularly with different movement sets for weapon types and palette swaps for each character class. As he was tied up with illustration work for the Vita remake of Muramasa, Kamitani was often late delivering his artwork. This meant that other staff members at Vanillaware, including fellow artist Shigetake, stepped in to create artworks. While using the basic design of their earlier titles, the team added a pixel shader which Ohnishi compared to a gamma corrector, allowing water effects in the 2D plane.

=== Release ===
Dragon's Crown was announced in June 2011. In an interview, Oda said that overseas responses to the game were strong, pointing out the positive reputation of Odin Sphere and Muramasa as reasons for this. The publisher was changed from UTV Ignition to Atlus in April 2012, with statements from both publishers on the matter. The game was released in Japan on July 25, 2013. It was localised for the West by Atlus USA, who released it close to the Japanese version's release date. This meant localization had to start while the game was in production. The English voice recording was handled by PCB Productions, a frequent collaborator with Atlus USA, and overseen by Valerie Arem. Dragon's Crown was released in North America on August 6. In Europe and Australia, the game was published by NIS America, with pre-orders from selected European stores coming with a small artbook; it was released in Australia on October 10 and in Europe on October 11. The PAL digital PlayStation Network (PSN) version was taken down when NIS America and Atlus ended their publishing partnership in 2016. It was later republished on PSN by Atlus.

Dragon's Crown received downloadable content (DLC) post-launch, which allowed the narration to be changed to one of the six character class voice actors. Five patches, which fixed issues and added new content, were released between August and December 2013. The patches included cross-platform play not available at launch, additional difficulty settings, and new gameplay elements.

A manga adaptation began serialisation in the December 2013 issue of Comptiq, a magazine published by Kadokawa Shoten. The manga was written and illustrated by Yuztan, an artist then new to manga who later worked on Valkyrie Drive. To properly interpret the game's story into manga form, Yuztan played the game himself. He incorporated all the classes as characters and crafted their personalities based on his impression of them. The manga ran from 2013 to 2014. It was published in two tankōbon in June and December 2014 by Kadokawa Shoten. In North America, the manga volumes were published by Udon Entertainment. The two volumes were released in the region in November 2017 and October 2018. A novelization was written by Hironori Kato, featuring a cover illustration by Kamitani, was published by Fujimi Shobo. An artbook was published by Atlus in January 2016. The book featured concept and character art, interviews with staff, and guest illustrations. Udon Entertainment published the artbook in September 2019. Figurines based on the Sorceress and Amazon characters have been released in Japan.

=== Dragon's Crown Pro ===
Dragon's Crown Pro is a remastered port for the PS4. It features enhancements for the PS4's Pro model, replace/redraw hi-res sprites to support 4K resolution, English and Japanese voicetracks, a rerecorded soundtrack, cross-platform play, and all previous patches and DLC. Originally scheduled for January 15, 2018 in Japan, it was delayed by a couple of weeks to February 8. In the West, Pro was released on May 15 of the same year. A limited Battle Hardened Edition was released exclusively in the West alongside its standard physical and digital editions. The Battle Hardened Edition includes a steel case for the game, and seven cards themed after the in-game skill trees.

Dragon's Crown Pro was the first time Vanillaware had sought to update an existing title in this way, which proved a challenge as they needed to do bug fixes and balance adjustment based on the latest patch version of the game. Kamitani acted as a producer for the game, running parallel with his work on 13 Sentinels: Aegis Rim. One of the biggest issues faced in development was getting all assets to show in 4K without jagged edges or distracting graphical glitches, a process which took six months. So jagged edges would not be too visible in-game, planner Wataru Nakanishi worked to put in extra graphical fuzzing to smooth the edges of colour transitions in illustrations and art assets. The final patch which enabled crossplay was the most difficult to date, as they needed to adjust for the changes made since the game's release. While they needed to reduce some in-game storage space to make room for some of the patch features, they considered it a fair trade as they included elements originally cut from the base game.

=== Music ===
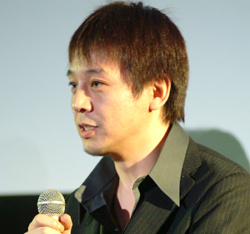
Hitoshi Sakimoto composed and co-arranged the soundtrack of Dragon's Crown.

The music was composed by long-term Vanillaware collaborator Hitoshi Sakimoto and his company Basiscape. It was Sakimoto's first solo soundtrack in many years. Sakimoto wanted to explore how humans confronted the forces of nature and monsters. His chosen overall focus of the music was defined by him as "affection". The musical tracks were divided into three categories accompanying this theme; humans, nature and monsters. Within his score, humans lived life to the full regardless of their morals, nature was impersonal and could provide support, and monsters were supernatural things divorced from everything else. While many of his previous scores had been set in worlds of either dominant hope or despair, with Dragon's Crown he wanted to balance the two. He also shifted his style to incorporate more ethnic percussion. The score was arranged by Sakimoto and Azusa Chiba. For the game's vocals, Sakimoto chose singer Eumyth to evoke its fantasy elements.

A 3CD soundtrack album was released on November 30, 2015 through Basiscape Records. The album, which featured a jacket illustration from Vanillaware staff, included exclusive piano arrangements of the themes "World Map" and "City Street". The arrangements were created by Yu Kanai. The album was later released digitally worldwide through iTunes on April 1, 2016. The album received positive reviews from music journalists.

For Pro, the music was re-recorded for a live orchestra. Chiba arranged the music, incorporating folk instruments and extensive percussion into the new versions. Recording took place in Tokyo, Hyogo and Australia. A 3-disc soundtrack originally released exclusively through the limited edition of Pro. The album included an extra track dubbed "Dragon's Crown Percussion Remix", a new remix of the main theme. A standalone soundtrack album was released on February 27, 2020, exclusively through Atlus's online store. The album features three discs, and has a cover art drawn by Kida. The soundtrack includes the same selection as the limited-edition version. The album was also released digitally worldwide through iTunes. Both albums were released for streaming services worldwide in June 2025.

== Reception ==
Reception

Aggregate score
Aggregator	Score
Metacritic	(PS3) 82/100 (Vita) 77/100 (PS4) 80/100

Review scores
Publication	Score
Destructoid	9.5/10 (Original); 8/10 (Pro)
Electronic Gaming Monthly	4/5 (Original); 4/5 (Pro)
Eurogamer	6/10
Famitsu	34/40
GameSpot	8/10
GameTrailers	9/10
IGN	8.5/10
Joystiq	4.5/5
Polygon	6.5/10
RPGFan	85% (Original); 80% (Pro)

=== Critical reception ===
Dragon's Crown received "generally favorable" reviews from critics, according to the review aggregator website Metacritic. At the 2013 National Academy of Video Game Trade Reviewers awards, Dragon's Crown won in the "Game, Original Role-Playing" category.

Japanese gaming magazine Famitsu gave a positive review to both the PS3 and Vita versions, praising the gameplay and nostalgic style. Destructoid's Chris Carter was highly positive, praising the game for reviving the beat 'em up genre. Andrew Fitch, writing for Electronic Gaming Monthly, praised the game as "a love letter to the classic side-scrolling arcade brawler". Martin Robinson of Eurogamer was less positive than other reviewers, praising some elements but disliking the artstyle and finding it overly long and archaic. GameSpot's Peter Brown found many elements of the visuals either distracting or offensive, but praised the gameplay design and skill system.

Justin Speer of GameTrailers praised the game for breathing life into its genre, saying players who were willing to push through its repetitive aspects would find a lot to enjoy. Writing for Joystiq, Danny Cowan was worried about repeating content in the late game, but praised the game's mechanics and style. IGN's Colin Moriarty was also highly positive, with his only main criticism being the narrative. Danielle Riendeau of Polygon noted the repetitive nature of level design and disliked much of its art design, but said that it was an enjoyable experience. RPGFan's Robert Steinman, reviewing the PS3 version, praised the game but faulted its UI design and the "obfuscation" of its multiplayer.

The narrative was seen by many as either unnecessary or forced at players, though it was also praised for evoking nostalgia. Moriarty called the story "its greatest weakness", while Famitsu praised the story's nostalgic style and compared it to playing a tabletop RPG. The gameplay was praised or at least noted for evoking the design and experience of classic beat 'em up titles from the 1980s to 1990s. (Note: Famitsu, Destructoid, Electronic Gaming Monthly, Eurogamer, GameTrailers, Joystiq, GameSpot, IGN.) The multiplayer was lauded by reviewers as superior to AI-controlled companions despite its unlocking requirements, although many complained that the number of on-screen effects obscured their characters. The original lack of cross-platform multiplayer was criticized by some journalists. The searching and commanding mechanic was also faulted in the PS3 version as cumbersome. The artwork in general was praised by reviewers, with Cowan calling it "unique and eye-catching".

Reviewing Dragon's Crown Pro, Chris Moyse of Destructoid echoed many of Carter's comments, calling Pro the game's "definitive edition" while noting that there was little to justify buying it a second time. Mollie L Patterson, writing for Electronic Gaming Monthly, admitted that the only improvements were to the graphics and audio, but felt that the gameplay and art still made it a worthwhile purchase. RPGFan's Alana Hagues praised the existing upgrades and enjoyed the game, but was disappointed by the lack of additional features and content as seen in other Vanillaware re-releases.

=== Sales ===
Upon its debut in Japan, Dragon's Crown sold 175,000 physical units. Due to the strong demand, a stock shortage emerged at its release. Dragon's Crown had sold more than 300,000 physical retail units in Japan within the first week of release across both PS3 and Vita platforms. The Vita and PS3 versions were respectively the first and second best-selling digital games on PSN in Japan during 2013. By December 2013, the game had shipped 800,000 units worldwide, 100,000 units more than Atlus's Persona 4 Golden. The original Dragon's Crown sold over one million units worldwide by September 2017. The game's international success took Vanillaware by surprise, with it becoming much bigger than Kamitani expected.

=== Controversy ===
Dragon's Crown drew significant controversy in pre-release coverage during April 2013 for its exaggerated character design, particularly the Sorceress' breasts and Amazon's buttocks. Game journalist Jason Schreier of Kotaku strongly criticized the design, calling it symptomatic of the video game industry's treatment of women. While many critics lauded the game's artistic achievements and Kamitani's skill, they also felt uncomfortable with his perceived over-sexualization of women. Kamitani responded with artwork of three bathing dwarfs in loincloths that was interpreted as a homophobic attack on Schreier, escalating the controversy. Kamitani later explained both his design choices in the game and the Dwarf artwork. The latter was described as not being aimed at Schreier, but being a piece of artwork he created on his own as a "cynical" response to Japanese retailers requesting the female characters in swimwear for store artwork. Atlus defended the game's artistic design.

Several reviewers commented on the artstyle when the game was released. Brown described the Sorceress and Amazon designs as akin to softcore pornography. Speer compared these elements to the inclusion of bodybuilding and "dirty" magazines. Riendeau noted that the Amazon and Sorceress, while sexualized, were empowered and had agency compared to other in-game women being shown as damsels in distress. Robinson found the sexualized female artwork one of the elements that put him off the game, also being critical of counterarguments about the male characters being equally sexualized. Fitch, while noting the Amazon and Sorceress designs, felt that the controversy was overblown, as the entire cast was exaggerated and "grotesque".
