= Princess Crown =

1997 action role-playing game

- Sega Saturn cover art
- Developer: Atlus (Note: An unnamed developer handled production for the first year.)
- Publisher: Atlus
- Director: George Kamitani
- Producer: Hiroyuki Tanaka
- Programmers: Tetsuya Ikawa; Takashi Nishii
- Artist: Kawazuine Shioya
- Writers: Hitomi Fukaumi; Shigeo Komori
- Composers: Atlus Sound Team; Toshikazu Tanaka
- Platforms: Sega Saturn; PlayStation Portable; PlayStation 4
- Release: Sega Saturn: JP: December 11, 1997; PlayStation Portable: JP: September 22, 2005; PlayStation 4: JP: January 31, 2020
- Genre: Action role-playing
- Mode: Single-player

Princess Crown (Note: Purinsesu Kuraun (Japanese: プリンセスクラウン)) is an action role-playing game developed and published by Atlus in collaboration with Sega that was released only in Japan. Originally released in 1997 for the Sega Saturn, it was ported to the PlayStation Portable in 2005. Using a two-dimensional side-scrolling perspective, gameplay focuses on a beat 'em up-style fighting system, incorporating role-playing elements. Set in the fantasy kingdom of Valendia, the player controls queen Gradriel De Valendia, as her wish to aid the people in person leads into a quest to prevent the resurrection of the demon lord Lalva. Additional character scenarios are unlocked by completing Gradriel's quest, with completion of all story routes leading to the true ending.

The game began development in 1995 at an unnamed company, with Capcom veteran George Kamitani as director. After the company went bankrupt the following year, the team were absorbed into Atlus' Osaka studio to complete development. Initially planned as a life simulation game similar to Princess Maker 2, it was redesigned as an action role-playing game to compete with similar titles on the PlayStation. While a commercial failure, it was positively reviewed, and later lauded for its art design. Princess Crown continued to influence Kamitani's career, leading to the founding of his company Vanillaware and the development of the spiritual successor Odin Sphere. A planned Dreamcast sequel was cancelled, but later revived by Vanillaware as Dragon's Crown.

== Gameplay ==
A battle in Princess Crown; central protagonist Gradriel fights a common enemy during an early battle.

Princess Crown is a two-dimensional (2D) side-scrolling action role-playing game where the player takes control of four different characters across multiple scenarios. The game world is navigated using linear paths connecting towns and dungeons. During exploration in towns, characters can purchase items using gold attained from battles. Among the items present are seeds which can be planted to yield ingredients which can be used to restore character health. Ingredients can also be cooked and turned into meals which offer a greater health boost to characters.

Combat—which uses a beat 'em up-style battle system—is divided into normal battles triggered by random encounters while navigating the roads and dungeon environments, and boss battles tied to story events. While many normal battles are against a single enemy, sometimes multiple enemies appear in a single battle. The player attacks using a single button, creating combination attacks depending on both the number of button presses and other actions such as jumping and dodging. Each character has a main weapon and subweapons which can be thrown at enemies from a distance, and a shield which can be raised to block attacks. All combat actions are tied to the Power gauge; every action consumes Power, with full depletion leaving the character vulnerable to attack. Standing idle or walking allows the Power gauge to replenish.

Armor and accessories can be equipped which increase character statistics, ranging from raising attack power to healing the player character. Consumable items are stored in an inventory, which can be accessed during battle to use both healing items and expendable attack items such as elemental jewels. At the end of each successful battle, the player is awarded experience points which may raise their experience level, increasing the character's health and attack power.

== Synopsis ==
Princess Crown opens with the warrior queen Elfaran De Valendia defeating an evil demon who sought royal blood to resurrect its master Lalva. Twenty-five years later, Elfaran's thirteen-year-old daughter Gradriel ascends to the throne. After hearing of problems across Valendia, she sneaks out of her castle to help her people in person. During her journey, she is confronted by multiple demons and runs into three other characters on her journey; the knight Edward Glowstar, the noble pirate Portgus, and the mischievous witch-in-training Proserpina. The demon attacks are being caused by Lalva, who—through humans controlled by a sentient grimoire—seeks to use both the magical crowns of Valendia and neighbouring kingdom Volga to break his seal. During one encounter, Edward dies protecting Gradriel. He is saved when Gradriel travels back in time to save him on advice from Heindel, a dragon who helps her in exchange for a magical jewel. After Volga's crown is stolen by the sorcerer Leon, the latest person possessed by the grimoire, Gradriel gathers her forces at Valendia's castle for a final stand. She defeats Leon, but seal is broken. Entering the demon world, Gradriel defeats Lalva and seals away the grimoire.

Following the completion of Gradriel's quest, three more scenarios are unlocked, following the characters Edward, Proserpina and Portgus. Edward's scenario shows his journey and fight with a corrupted dragon; Portgus' scenario reveals his actions surrounding Gradriel's aid during his quest to reclaim his name from an imposter; and Proserpina's scenario follows her antics around other events. It is later revealed that the corrupted dragon killed by Edward was one of four dragons created by the goddess Gaia a thousand years before to hold her power for when she could be resurrected; the other two dragons died during the wait, leaving Heindel the only survivor. Heindel used Gradriel, Edward and Portgus to reclaim the lost jewels. After completing all four scenarios, a fifth scenario is unlocked where Heindel, now possessing all the jewels but unwilling to die himself, forces Gradriel to kill him as humanity's representative. After Heindel's defeat, Gaia is resurrected and swears to protect the world. The final scenes show the people recounting Gradriel's story and the other characters continuing with their lives.

== Development ==
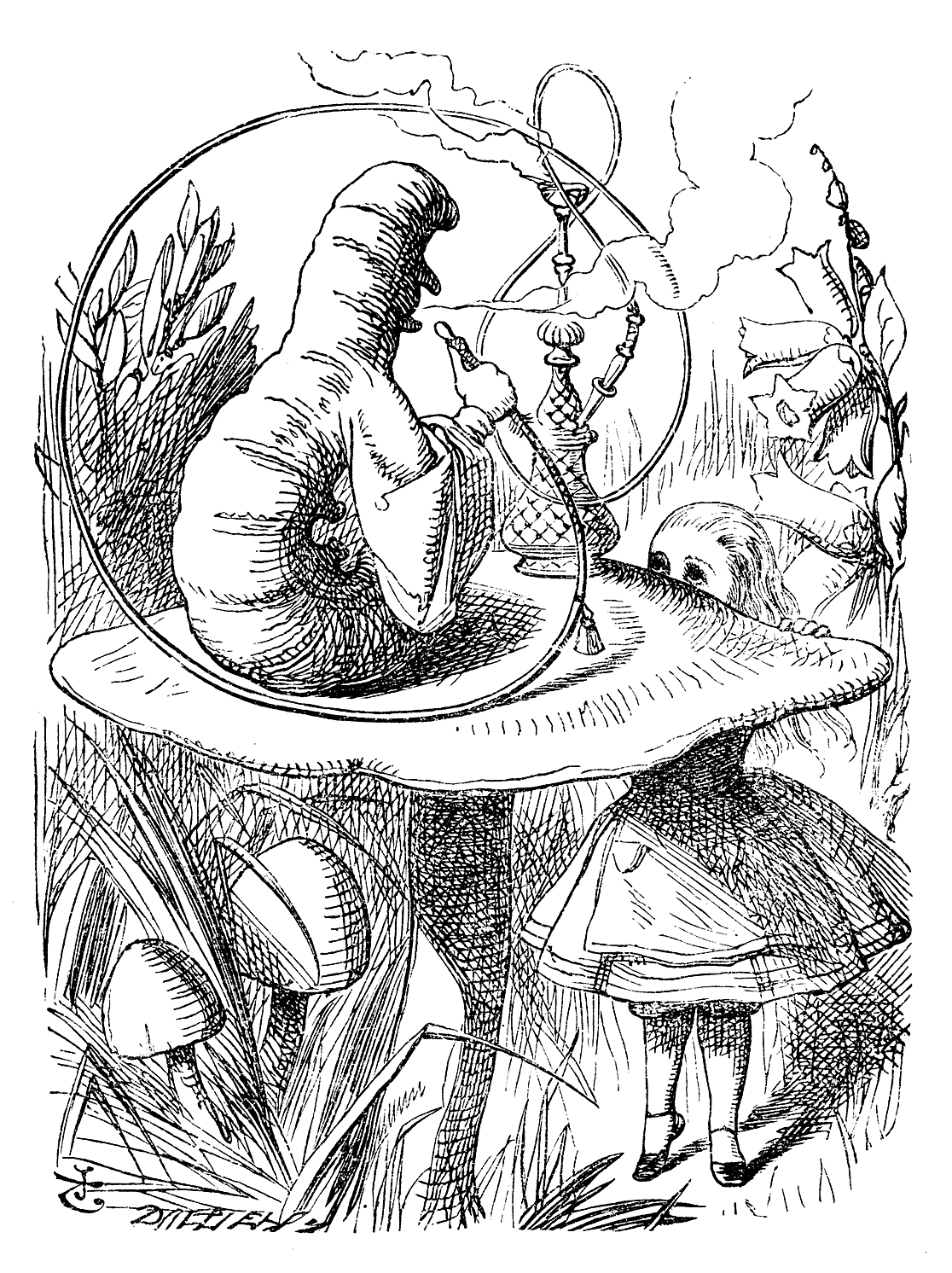
The illustrations of John Tenniel influenced the game's director George Kamitani; he aimed to create a role-playing video game with "a visual style influenced by Alice in Wonderland".

Princess Crown was the creation of George Kamitani, a developer who worked at Capcom on Saturday Night Slam Masters and Dungeons & Dragons: Tower of Doom before leaving to become a freelancer and direct his own project. He joined a friend at an unnamed development company based in Osaka; initially focused on adult video games, the company was branching out into other genres. Princess Crown was originally envisioned as a life simulation game similar to Princess Maker 2, with players raising a female character and multiple possible endings stemming from their choices. This was changed abruptly when the game was being pitched to Sega; they asked if it was a lengthy role-playing game, a genre they wanted for the Saturn due to ongoing competition with the PlayStation. To prevent the game being rejected, Kamitani said it was a role-playing game, and quickly redid his designs to replace the simulation aspects with action role-playing gameplay.

Development began in late 1995 based on this revised concept, but the project ran into difficulties the following year when the company went bankrupt. While Kamitani tried going to Sega for direct funding, they were in the middle of negotiations for a possible merger with Bandai and declined to fund the project. Through a friend at Sega, Kamitani next pitched the project to Atlus, who agreed to hire the game's staff and complete the project. Princess Crown was developed at Atlus Kansai, with additional help from Sega as publisher. Kamitani acted as director and designer, Atlus staff member Hiroyuki Tanaka was producer, the programmers were Tetsuya Ikawa and Takashi Nishii, while the scenario was written by Hitomi Fukaumi and Shigeo Komori. The music was mostly handled by the in-house Atlus Sound Team, with additional work by Metal Slug composer Toshikazu Tanaka, who was brought on board the project partway through development to compose a few new tracks and complete any unfinished work; he was mistakenly credited as the game's sole composer in later years. Kamitani later felt surprised that development finished on the game, as the production period was "chaos".

For a time, the game was developed under the working title Book of Sorcery. This was because the intended title's abbreviation of PuriKura was being easily mixed up with "purikura", special photo booths that Atlus were helping produce. Atlus tried to have the game's title change to avoid confusion, but Kamitani's team successfully retained the title Princess Crown due to its relevance to the story. According to Kamitani, he wanted to create "a game like Dragon Quest with a visual style influenced by Alice in Wonderland", the latter referring to the illustrations of John Tenniel. This tied into why he made the lead character a young girl, a decision in line with the tastes of the game's original developer. Princess Crown saw the beginning of a style used in his later games of women taking the lead role. The choice of side-scrolling 2D graphics over 3D graphics was made based on the console's hardware limitations, which included little RAM and both presented problems for the team and left others surprised that they succeeded. The sprite animations were created using what was dubbed the "Character Morphing System", allowing fluid and varied movement sets for sprite models. Kamitani later noted that developing the game for the Saturn was easier than it would have been for the PlayStation, as the Saturn hardware produced smoother 2D graphical animations.

== Release ==
Princess Crown was revealed in May 1997. The beginning of promotion for the title came after the agreement between Atlus and Sega to co-develop the title. The game was released on December 11 the same year. It was re-released on December 10, 1998, as part of the budget Saturn Collection.

Atlus later ported the game to the PlayStation Portable (PSP). The port was managed by Hiroki Toyama, an Atlus staff member who would go on to direct Tokyo Mono Hara Shi: Karasu no Mori Gakuen Kitan. Initially unaware of the title, Toyama was favorably impressed by it when he played the Saturn original. His main goal when porting was to preserve the original experience as far as possible. He and the programmers paid particular attention to debugging the game. The PSP port was released on September 22, 2005. A port of the PSP version to PlayStation 4 was created, being released as both a pre-order bonus and paid downloadable content for 13 Sentinels: Aegis Rim. It was provided to buyers of the game's Digital Artbook. The port's screen resolution was based on the PSP version.

No version of Princess Crown has received an international release. In a preview of the game, 1UP.com noted that while Atlus was looking into bringing the game overseas, Sony's content approval policy appeared like it would make localization efforts problematic. Kamitani later stated in 2009 that the game's age impeded any localization efforts. Another reason, cited in a feature for 1UP.com, was the loss of the game's original source code. Video game journalist Anoop Gantayat notably created a translation guide for the game, while other online guides covered missing sections such as side quests and the true ending. An English fan translation of the Sega Saturn version was released in April 2025.

== Reception ==
Reception

Review scores
Publication	Score
Consoles +	91%
Famitsu	29/40
Hardcore Gamer	4/5
Joypad	85%
RPGFan	95%
GamerTell	8/10
Weekly TV Gamer	7.75/10

According to Kamitani, the release of Princess Crown near the end of the Saturn's commercial life resulted in poor sales. Financial losses were compounded by the bankruptcy of its previous developer. In the years following its release, the Saturn version became rare, becoming known as a cult classic. The PSP port sold 22,000 units during 2005.

Japanese gaming magazine Famitsu gave the game a positive review, with its four reviewers giving it a score of 29 points out of 40. It received a 7.75 out of 10 average from Japanese Weekly TV Gamer magazine, based on individual scores of 7, 7, and 8 from its three reviewers. Following its release, the game has received praise for its smooth 2D animation and artstyle. Anoop Gantayat of IGN and the reviewer for 1UP.com ranked Princess Crown as being among the greatest 2D video games in existence. Damien McFerran of Nintendo Life and Richard Eisenbeis of Kotaku felt that the game was a historical curiosity from the Saturn era due to its design.

Jenni Lada, reviewing the PSP version for GamerTell, ranked the game alongside other titles for the platform including Crisis Core: Final Fantasy VII and LocoRoco. Eisenbeis enjoyed the combat system, but faulted the repetitive backtracking, occasional imbalances due to difficulty spikes and enemy behaviour, and the restrictive nature of the Power meter. GameSpot's Ricardo Torres had similar praise for the blend of styles. In an article for Hardcore Gaming 101, Kurt Kalata positively noted the blend of gameplay styles while noting several mechanics which lacked balance, causing problems for players.

While RPGFan did not comment much on the story, the reviewer liked the reversal of role-playing tradition by having players control a female lead for much of the game. Eisenbeis cited both the main narrative and later additional storylines as high points of the game. The game's art design was universally praised by critics, with praise focusing on its character and background designs, in addition to the smooth animation of sprites. The PSP port was criticized by multiple outlets for the lack of effort put into the process, mainly citing the lack of 16:9 screen support.

== Legacy ==
Due to the commercial failure of Princess Crown, Kamitani's team was blacklisted in the game industry, which hampered Kamitani's future career for some time. Shortly after the game's release, Atlus Kansai was dissolved and several staff members went on to found Noise Factory. Atlus and Sega would go on to collaborate on multiple projects following Princess Crown.

Kamitani founded Vanillaware with former Atlus staff members and produced Odin Sphere for the PlayStation 2; Odin Sphere was a critical and commercial success, establishing both Vanillaware and Kamitani in the gaming industry. Both Odin Sphere and Vanillaware's next game Muramasa: The Demon Blade were designed as spiritual successors to Princess Crown, with the former evolving its narrative and the latter its gameplay.

A sequel to Princess Crown was being drafted by Kamitani during the later development phase and into 1998. Intended as a 3D title for Sega's Dreamcast, the project was cancelled following the commercial failure of Princess Crown and dispersal of Atlus Kansai. Early artwork created by Kamitani for the game was later repurposed for Fantasy Earth: The Ring of Dominion, on which Kamitani served as art director. The sequel was eventually redesigned by Kamitani as the 2D action role-playing game Dragon's Crown, and was released in 2013 to critical and commercial success.
