= Dungeons & Dragons: Chronicles of Mystara =

2013 video game compilation

- Cover art of the English version
- Developer(s): Iron Galaxy Studios
- Publisher(s): Capcom
- Series: Dungeons & Dragons
- Platform(s): PlayStation 3 Windows; Xbox 360; Wii U
- Release: PlayStation 3, Windows, Xbox 360: WW: August 22, 2013; Wii U: NA: September 5, 2013; PAL: September 12, 2013
- Genre(s): Beat 'em up, action role-playing
- Mode(s): Single-player, multiplayer

Dungeons & Dragons: Chronicles of Mystara (Note: Japanese: ダンジョンズ＆ドラゴンズ ―ミスタラ英雄戦記―) is a 2013 video game compilation by Capcom released as a digital download for the PlayStation 3, Wii U, Windows (via Steam), and Xbox 360. It includes two arcade games based on the Dungeons & Dragons franchise: Dungeons & Dragons: Tower of Doom (1994) and Dungeons & Dragons: Shadow over Mystara (1996).

== Release ==
The game was released on August 22, 2013. The Japanese version of the game, exclusive to the PlayStation 3 and having a retail release, was developed internally at Capcom by the original team, and features more accurate emulation than the worldwide release plus exclusive content.

== Reception ==
Reception

Aggregate score
Aggregator	Score
Metacritic	PC: 80/100; PS3: 83/100; Wii U: 77/100; X360: 77/100

Dungeons & Dragons: Chronicles of Mystara was positively received by critics. Review aggregating website Metacritic gave the PC version 80/100, the PlayStation 3 version 83/100, and the Xbox 360 version 77/100. Reviewing the Xbox 360 version, Rob Kershaw at The Digital Fix gave the game 8/10 noting that while the graphics and music have become dated since the original arcade releases in the 1990s, the port was faithful to the source and the development team had added plenty of extras to increase the game's longevity. Erik Kain of Forbes gave a favorable review and opined that it plays a bit like Double Dragon, Ninja Turtles games, and other classic NES/SEGA side-scrolling brawlers.

== See also ==
- Dungeons & Dragons Collection
