= Fantasy Earth Zero =

2006 video game

- Cover art for the original release as Fantasy Earth: The Ring of Dominion.
- Developer: SoftGear (Note: Original version developed by Puraguru (Vanillaware) and Multiterm. Development from 2018 to 2020 handled by Ocean Frontier.)
- Publisher: Square Enix (Note: Original published by Square Enix. Zero originally published by Gamepot. Taiwanese release published by Gamania.)
- Director: Tetsuya Fujimoto
- Designer: Akashi Yamaguchi
- Artist: George Kamitani
- Composers: Hitoshi Sakimoto; Masaharu Iwata; Manabu Namiki; Kenichi Koyano
- Platform: Microsoft Windows
- Release: JP: February 23, 2006; NA: May 18, 2010
- Genre: MMORPG
- Mode: Multiplayer

Fantasy Earth Zero (Note: Fantajī Āsu Zero (Japanese: ファンタジーアースゼロ)) was a 2006 massively multiplayer online role-playing game developed for Microsoft Windows. Originally developed by Puraguru (now known as Vanillaware) and Multiterm under the title Fantasy Earth: The Ring of Dominion, (Note: Fantajī Āsu: Za Ringu Obu Dominion (ファンタジーアース ザ リング オブ ドミニオン)) it was released by Square Enix as a paid product through its PlayOnline service. It relaunched under Gamepot as a free game, and was later handled by developers SoftGear and Ocean Frontier and was transferred back to Square Enix. Under the premise of a world where rival kingdoms engage in frequent conflicts, players choose an allied kingdom and fight against each other in groups of up to fifty players. The game closed down in September 2022.

Fantasy Earth began in 2001 as a project under Enix, with Puraguru founder George Kamitani steering the project away from its initial concept of humans fighting vampires to its current kingdom-based aesthetic. Kamitani and Puraguru left the project in 2004 due to differences with Square Enix, with Multiterm taking over production duties. Production met with several challenges including logistic issues, the technology required for large-scape online battles, and the merger of Enix with Square in 2003. The original music was composed by Basiscape, a company founded by composer Hitoshi Sakimoto.

The original release was unsuccessful, but following its re-release under Gamepot, it became successful and profitable; it gained one million players by 2011. Reviews have praised its aesthetic and gameplay. Over the years, Fantasy Earth featured collaborations with several other video game series, and spawned two spin-off mobile titles. Kamitani and Basiscape would collaborate on all future Vanillaware titles.

== Gameplay ==
A large-scale battle between player factions.

Fantasy Earth Zero was a massively multiplayer online role-playing game (MMORPG) in which the player controls a customizable avatar and chooses one of the five nations to ally with and fight for. There was no storyline beyond the setting and premise, with the intended narrative being created by the battles of player factions. In the game's setting of Melpharia, a long era of peace causes ancient petty differences between the nations to erupt into full-scale wars for control over magical crystals that gave birth to all things. During the character creation stage, the player chose a gender, character class, weapon type and starting nation. The main emphasis of gameplay was player-versus-player battles, carried out on the same server; starting with a minimum of seven versus seven, it went up to large-scale battles between two armies of fifty players. Alongside this, there was a player versus environment element, with players able to fight hordes of monsters for lower rewards.

Player-versus-player battles were balanced by forcing each side to have a similar number of participants, placing "overflow" players into a queue waiting to enter the battle. Players from the two warring kingdoms received preference in this queue. A maximum of fifty players were allowed on each sides of the battle. Kingdom-versus-kingdom battles were all held on the same server. During battles, players needed to manually aim attacks at their opponent, and were allowed free movement through the map. Victory for either side was determined by territory controlled and individual enemy players defeated. Experience points were distributed across the victorious player army based on overall performance.

Another element of these battles was a building and fortification aspect similar to tower defense games. Players could use resources taken from crystals scattered across the battle map and construct different types of fortification and buildings, ranging from defensive structures to buildings which offered player advantages or could be used to directly attack the enemy. During battles, players could also use special structures to summon allied monsters into the battlefield, granting advantages in battles. Later updates added new building types, weather effects, and additional levels of factions for players to interact with. In-game items could be earned, or bought for real money at a dedicated shop.

== Development ==
=== The Ring of Dominion ===
Fantasy Earth Zero began production in 2001 as Fantasy Earth: The Ring of Dominion, a small-scale online game project led by Enix. During this period, it was headed by George Kamitani, a developer whose previous work included fighting games for Capcom and the Sega Saturn game Princess Crown. The project ballooned in scale, and to facilitate its development Kamitani created a small development studio dubbed Puraguru (later known as Vanillaware) in 2002. The project was originally planned as a battle scenario between humans and vampires, but under Kamitani's guidance the scenario changed to a battle between princess-themed kingdoms. It was Kamitani's first time developing a 3D game, and he recycled artwork and assets from Dragon's Crown, a cancelled Dreamcast sequel to Princess Crown. Production was originally placed in a small section of the Enix company building nicknamed the "submarine". By 2003, Enix had merged with Square to become Square Enix, and Kamitani stated that the newly merged company took the project away from him. Kamitani and Puraguru left production in 2004, and development was taken over by Multiterm. By this point, Tetsuya Fujimoto acted as the game's director, while Akashi Yamaguchi was lead designer.

The overall theme of the gameplay was emulating the entertainment of both player battles and normal player-versus-environment combat. Production of Fantasy Earth began when asymmetric digital subscriber lines (a high bandwidth connection technology allowing multiple people to access the same website) were becoming common, but the idea of a hundred players fighting each other was highly ambitious for its time and caused several problems. The game design was intended to be fast and action-based similar to first-person shooters, putting it in contrast with the command-based character control of most MMOs at the time. Several planned elements, such as stamina in battles and item or currency-based loss penalties, were dropped from the final release based on player feedback. Other issues included the lead staff changing multiple times, with Kamitani's departure being one of the more notable; enabling voice chat without crashing the system; and the merger of Square and Enix during the game's production. The music was composed primarily by a team from Basiscape, a company founded by former Square composer Hitoshi Sakimoto, who came on board when Kamitani still led development. The music was co-composed by Sakimoto, Masaharu Iwata and Manabu Namiki. Iwata composed the title theme, while Sakimoto contributed three tracks, and Namiki contributed one track. Another contributor to the original version was Kenichi Koyano, an independent composer who has worked on a variety of titles, including other projects Basiscape worked on.

The Ring of Dominion was announced in September 2004, scheduled for a release late in 2005. It was a notable game in Square Enix's business plan for its use of PlayOnline, a subscription-based online service platform for its titles at the time. It was the second announced game to use it after Final Fantasy XI, and formed part of the company's expanding corporate strategy at the time. It was promoted through Chains of Promathia, an expansion to Final Fantasy XI. Its first beta test began in October the following year. Due to its unusual network design, the team partnered with a local vocational school and installed the game client on their computers, enrolling its students in the beta test. For the different beta tests, they chose different kingdoms to represent, allowing them to adjust the balance so each would be able to have a chance in battles. The full game was released in Japan on February 23, 2006. It was originally released with the release model of an initial purchase fee followed by a monthly subscription. In November of that year, Square Enix transferred ownership and management of Fantasy Earth to Gamepot; the move came with a shift to item-based billing, with the base game being a free download.

=== Zero ===
With the transition from Square Enix to Gamepot, the game was renamed Fantasy Earth Zero. The game's title referred to its setting of Earth, the fantasy aesthetic, and the need to work together to win battles. It relaunched under its new title and model on December 7, 2006. Developer Multiterm changed its development structure to release regular updates and the change to item-based purchases positively altered both developer income and the general flow of gameplay compared to The Ring of Dominion. An issue with the item purchases was to make them both tempting for players and not mandatory, along with giving options for customisation. Due to this, several mechanics from The Ring of Dominion were adjusted and rebalanced for the systems of Zero. The next few years, the title underwent multiple updates to its gameplay systems, adding character classes and balance adjustments. Multiterm was merged with NHN Japan Corporation in 2007, and continued development in this capacity until 2008. The game also saw numerous collaborations with other video game series such as Trails.

As a result of discussions concerning the game's future between NHN Japan and Gamepot, staff members from Multiterm founded FenixSoft, which took over production of Fantasy Earth from NHN Japan. The game production and development was restructured; Square Enix maintained oversight of the game as supervisor and the original rights holder, Gamepot remained as publisher and server operator, and FenixSoft–later renamed SoftGear–handled actual game development. While some of the original staff remained, several new staff came on board to replace members who remained with NHN Japan. On March 30, 2012, a major update dubbed Chronicles was released for the game, featuring some gameplay adjustments, added environmental effects, and new characters with associated narratives. For the update, new battle themes were introduced. The themes were composed by Ryo Yamazaki, Hidenori Iwasaki and Tsuyoshi Sekito. In November 2015, Gamepot transferred all operations back to Square Enix. Between 2018 and 2020, production responsibilities were handed to Ocean Frontier.

Fantasy Earth Zero was released in mainland China during April 2007 by Square Enix's local branch. For its release in Taiwan, Square Enix and Gamepot partnered with Gamania. It was released on July 25 that year under the title Fantasy Wars. (Note: Chinese: 幻想戰記; pinyin: Huànxiǎng Zhànjì) Due to the end of the licensing agreement, the Taiwanese version was shut down on July 1, 2013. A North American release through Gamepot's local branch was announced in January 2010, supported by Square Enix. The title went through several beta tests, refining the game balance and stability before its final release. Square Enix handled the game's localization, which was described as an easy process. It was released in North America on May 18 the same year. Its North American servers were shut down on March 24, 2011, less than a year after the game's debut in the region. Square Enix closed Fantasy Earth Zero on September 28, 2022.

== Reception ==
The release of The Ring of Dominion was a commercial failure, with low subscription rates contributing to it being sold to Gamepot. By contrast, Fantasy Earth Zero rapidly became very popular and one of Japan's most active online games of 2007. Between 2007 and 2009, registered active users increased from 200,000 to 700,000. By July 2011, the game was supporting one million concurrent players.

The original release met with a generally positive reception from Japanese critics, who praised its fast pace and addicting gameplay loops. Game Watch Impress, reviewing the version from the final beta test, called it one of the most innovative online experiences available at the time, praising its networking and gameplay loop, and looking forward to both its future game modes and its possible influence on the Japanese MMO market going forward. 4Gamer.net, again reviewing the last beta version, enjoyed the combat loop and movement, but noted that its interface and item management might be confusing for players.

Contemporary and retrospective of Fantasy Earth Zero were also positive, praising similar elements to its original release, but also noting mechanical improvements and positively mentioning the item billing system. Game Watch Impress, reviewing one year after its service started, again praised the gameplay and cited the changes implemented after The Ring of Dominion as an improvement both new and returning players would appreciate. 4Gamer.net, writing a gameplay report on a 2007 update, noted continued mechanical additions and improvements which helped keep the game alive and interesting. Famitsu, writing in 2020, noted its continuity and cited it as a good experience for casual players, praising its weapon variety and variety of battle modes.

Writing about a preview build for the press, MMORPG.com's Carolyn Koh had little commentary about the gameplay but noted "the graphics and animation look good and the music is superb". Christophor Rick of Gamers Daily News, also writing a preview based on the pre-release build, felt there was a lack of explanation for elements such as shops and tutorials for quick movement. Michael Sagoe of OnRPG, reviewing the North American release, found himself enjoying the gameplay despite not being a fan of battle-focused titles. PC Gamer noted its "surprising" success in Japan given its convoluted development history.

== Legacy ==
Following their departure from production, Kamitani and Puraguru relocated to Kansai and renamed themselves Vanillaware, going on to develop multiple titles including Odin Sphere and a reimagined version of Dragon's Crown. Kamitani's parting with Square Enix was on poor terms, and he disliked the idea of working with the company again. Due to their earlier positive relationship, Kamitani has exclusively involved Basiscape and Sakimoto in his projects' music and sound design. The indie title Fantasy Versus, developed and published by Animu Games, was influenced by the gameplay of Fantasy Earth Zero.

A spin-off title set in the original game's universe, Melpharia March, (Note: Merufaria Māchi (メルファリア マーチ)) was released on September 19, 2013, for iOS. An Android version was released on August 12 the following year. The gameplay used a field-based tower defense style similar to the Plants vs. Zombies series. Developed by Square Enix, the title was first proposed in 2012 by current staff as an expansion to the Fantasy Earth universe which could be taken by players on the go. Both versions were shut down on December 15, 2015.

A mobile sequel, Fantasy Earth Genesis, (Note: Fantajī Āsu Jeneshisu (ファンタジーアースジェネシス)) was developed by Asobimo under supervision from Square Enix for Android and iOS. It was originally scheduled for a Western release in partnership with Quantum Games, and made available for pre-registration. Its gameplay was a multiplayer online battle arena-style title sharing the parent game's 50-versus-50 player battles and summoned monsters. The title was proposed by Asobimo to Square Enix in 2015 as a mobile MMO using the Fantasy Earth intellectual property. The title was aimed both at newcomers to the game and veteran players of Fantasy Earth. The biggest challenge presented to the developers was adapting a PC-focused gameplay loop into the limited control options of a mobile title, in addition to the technical difficulties of replicating the original's large-scale battles. The team used assets from Fantasy Earth Zero to create the character models and environments. At release, it saw a mixed popular reception. Despite extensive support, Square Enix felt that it was becoming difficult to provide a satisfactory experience. Genesis ended service on March 31, 2020.
