= Sorceress (Dragon's Crown) =

Fictional character in Dragon's Crown

- Dragon's Crown character
- The Sorceress from Dragon's Crown
- First game: Dragon's Crown (2013)
- Created by: George Kamitani
- Designed by: George Kamitani "Shigatake" (animation)
- Voiced by: EN: Erin Fitzgerald; JA: Kikuko Inoue

The Sorceress (Japanese: ソーサレス) is a character introduced in the 2013 side-scrolling beat 'em up roleplaying game Dragon's Crown, developed by Vanillaware. A tall redheaded woman specializing in magical attacks, she is a support character for the game, having low defense but able to conjure allies to fight on her behalf. Created by George Kamitani, her animations for the game were done by illustrator Shigatake. In English, the character is voiced by Erin Fitzgerald, while in Japanese she is voiced by Kikuko Inoue. Outside of video games, she was additionally featured in a manga novelization of Dragon's Crown.

Upon debut the character received particularly mixed response, in part becoming controversial due to Jason Schreier voicing several negative opinions about her design for the website Kotaku. Other outlets agreed with Schreier's assessment to varying degrees, citing the character as an example of the male gaze and a detriment in portraying gaming as inclusive for women. Contrary views also arose, arguing that some women appreciated such designs, and characters like the Sorceress would not exist without an active demand for them. Others appreciated the character after playing her, and argued she was not defined solely by her appearance.

== Concept and creation ==
The Sorceress' design changed significantly during development.

Created by George Kamitani for the beat 'em up Dragon's Crown, influences for the Sorceress and other characters came from basic design motifs of fantasy literature and gaming, such as his past work on Dungeons & Dragons: Tower of Doom, other games such as Sega's Golden Axe, and the literary works of J. R. R. Tolkien. He started with orthodox designs, feeling they were popular with Japanese audiences, but in order to stand out amongst other fantasy media in the market at the time he exaggerated the designs, to this end focusing on masculine or feminine traits to emphasize amongst the cast. Part of his aim was to "cartoonify" the character silhouettes, while also keeping them neutral enough for a Japanese market. While the game went through multiple iterations through its long development, the Sorceress was included in the concept art for the game's initially intended 1998 Sega Dreamcast release.

Early versions of the Sorceress's design featured her wearing a short skirt purple dress with long sleeves and gloves, a cloak, and a witch's hat, while her legs and cleavage were exposed and she carried a broom. The finalized design was significantly different however, making her a tall, slender red-haired woman with long hair. Her dress now exposes her shoulders and cleavage, with a white frilled section cupping her breasts. Sleeves extend from the sides of the dress to her wrists, ending at similar white frills just below her shoulders. The lower portion consists of simple shoes, a long purple skirt with a slit going up to her pelvis, and a brown sash around her waist. While the hat was retained, her broom was replaced with a wooden staff.

The character's most prominent feature are her large breasts, which protrude significantly from her chest and remain in motion during most of her animations. While Kamitani designed the character's poses, she was animated by illustrator Shigatake. Shigatake noted that while her large breasts were due to Kamitani's physical preferences, the emphasized jiggle was due to his own tastes, though at the same time admitted he may have gone too far with it. When designing the characters, Kamitani based the art style off of Western paintings, but this caused some complications when it came time to apply color palettes as the sprites were not designed for such. As a result, only the color of her hair and outfit change noticeably in game depending on selected palette.

== Appearances ==
As introduced in Vanillaware's 2013 video game Dragon's Crown, the Sorceress is a playable character that acts as one of the game's character classes, allowing players to customize their name and choose one of several color palettes at the start of the game. One of several warriors attempting to save the country of Hydeland, at the game's conclusion she retires to be a fortune teller for nobility, though eventually chooses to return to an adventurer's life. Additional downloadable content for the game added an option to change the game's narrator to one of the playable characters', including the Sorceress's. In English the character is voiced by Erin Fitzgerald, while in Japanese she is voiced by Kikuko Inoue. Outside of video games, the Sorceress also appears in the manga adaptation of Dragon's Crown, written by Hironori Kato and overseen by Vanillaware's staff.

In terms of gameplay, the Sorceress is a support-type character, meant to increase the overall strength of the group and provide both healing and offensive attacks as needed. As a result, she has low defense, and is better suited to attack at range. Her skills include various projectiles meant to hit enemies in their or on the ground, while her main physical skill is to dash into enemies hip first, doing a low amount of damage but pushing enemies farther back to give herself some distance. All of her magical attacks rely on a resource called "MP", which is replenished by defeating enemies or by a special attack that locks the Sorceress in place while it recharges. In addition to her projectiles, she can also transform enemies into frogs, petrify them, conjure food items to help heal herself and the party, and reanimate bone piles as living skeletons that assist the party.

== Promotion and reception ==
Several bits of merchandise featuring the Sorceress have been released, including tapestries, cleaning cloths, card sleeves, and t-shirts. Several figures of the character were also released by companies such as Good Smile, Union Creative, MegaHouse, and Max Factory. Two 1/7th scale figures by OrchidSeed in her primary and "Darkness Claw" color palettes were also produced, featuring a removable hat. The regular version of this figure saw a re-release in 2025. AlphaMax meanwhile released a 1/8 scale figure, though it was temporarily pulled from the market due to issues with the figure's face.

The Sorceress's sexualized appearance, specifically her breasts and their motion in regards to in-game animation, resulted in significant discussion targeting the character, the game, and Kamitani himself.

Upon debut, the character received polarizing reactions. Jason Schreier of Kotaku was particularly vocal about the sorceress, arguing that she appeared to be designed by "a 14-year-old boy" and that "perhaps game development studios should stop hiring teenagers". After the article received backlash, Schreier explained further and stated while he intended the previous article to be mere sarcasm, he described the character's design as "embarrassing", and in his eyes helped perpetuate a negative stereotype of Japanese video games that they were mainly a "boys' club", a mindset he felt pervaded the gaming industry for decades. He further felt that similarly sexualized male characters were not comparable, as to him they represented a "power fantasy", while he saw the sorceress's design as "juvenile". He further stated that while he had no intention to call for the character to be censored, in regards to her design he felt it repelled players more than it attracted, and furthermore in his view it "doesn't challenge viewers in interesting ways" nor did he "consider it beautiful".

Others shared similar sentiments. Rus McLaughlin of VentureBeat stated that at the E3 presentation of the game, he felt designs like the Sorceress's negatively impacted the title's appeal. Describing her as causing "great offense" due to her "overtly sexualized" design, he further felt it represented at minimum a disconnect with attempts to address gender equality issues in the gaming industry. Jeremy Parish for USGamer stated that while the design appeared to be an exaggeration of Final Fantasy X's black mage Lulu, the comical sexualization as well as the "over-the-top appearance and stark contrast" to the male cast led him to question why and if genre conventions justified that sort of treatment. Gearbox Software artist Shaylyn Hamm meanwhile attacked Kamitani's artistic skill upon seeing the character, comparing it to the work of "some juvenile delinquent" and added that the character "only serves to further cement the idea that you’re stepping into a male hobby rather than something that is more inclusive".

Josh Bycer in an article for Game Design felt that the character represented a problem of the male gaze in game design, stating while he was in "no position to tear apart someone's art", her animations "just put it too over the top". Danielle Riendeau in an article for Polygon expanded on the notion, expressing that she felt more comfortable discussing sexually attractive male characters than female characters like the Sorceress because to her the latter was designed to feel "attractive" but appeared instead to pander solely to heterosexual male players. She further compared such moments to the concept of a narrator explaining to a viewer they should be aroused, and the sense of unease that such would generate.

Others however offered a different insight on the character. Jenni Lada in an article for TechnologyTell said while initially she held disdain for the Sorceress' design that put her off wanting to play the character, when she did she instead found herself enjoying the character for her gameplay and abilities. She added that the Sorceress was "too useful and intriguing a character [...] to let a little thing like character art ruin a potentially awesome experience", and that her design when in comparison to other characters in the game fit well. Lauren Schumacher of Blast Magazine shared a similar reaction, stating that from the screenshots she had initially felt "such achingly beautiful artwork wasted on big, big, big titties" that "defied the laws of physics", but later came to appreciate the design, though not to the same extent as the game's other female characters, and questioned in some of the backlash against her was an attempt at "boob shaming".

=== Responses to criticism regarding sexualization ===
Bob Chipman in an article for The Escapist described her as "grounded in manga-flavored exaggerations of Frazetta/Vallejo-style High Fantasy art", and said while he understood the controversy he also felt she was unremarkable in the context of characters from games such as Soulcalibur or Tomb Raider. He also argued in favor of such character designs in games, admitting that what one may find aesthetically pleasing another may not. Chipman further noted that part of the discussion reflected how prevalent sexualized designs like the Sorceress' were in "geek media" media as a whole, and while he sympathized with those that saw her design as off-putting towards women with an interest in the video game industry he also understood the "aesthetic wellspring from whence the Sorceress seems to have leaped", adding that he found the design "rather pretty—as cartoons go, at least". Chipman further stated he recognized the demand for such designs, and expressed that liking such a character did not automatically equate to a misogynistic view nor should it diminish one's character in the eyes of others.

Jeff Grubb for VentureBeat commented that while he agreed with Schreier's characterization of Kamitani on the surface, he observed that many were claiming her design was "perverted", something he did not particularly perceive as a negative in that context. He elaborated by acknowledging directly that he found the character sexually arousing, and while he understood that art could be seen as "problematic" and off putting to others, at the same time he had no desire to be shamed for appreciating such a character. Though he agreed the Sorceress' design was not one he would show family members, he emphasized that characters like her should be able to exist alongside alternatives to help facilitate the notion that gaming was for everyone. Furthermore, while he felt more games should be made for a broader range of tastes, he stated answer to exclusion "was not more exclusion" to appease those that argued such designs should not exist. He also responded to Hamm's criticism of the character, feeling the developer's comments regarding the Sorceress' design impeding inclusivity "was weird" in light of Gearbox's portrayal of women in its Borderlands and Duke Nukem titles, particularly the latter.

Meanwhile, the character's voice actress Erin Fitzgerald also criticized what she saw as the "ridiculousness" of the implication that the character's large breasts made her design inherently sexist, arguing that such relied more on a character's action than their physique and attire. Recalling similar complaints were raised against another character she voiced, Parasoul from the fighting game Skullgirls, she described both as "2 of the strongest female characters I have ever voiced". She further added that if a female character was strong, powerful and had large breasts, "well that's just awesome" and she felt empowered to voice them.

In a retrospective, Claire Bolton in an article for Game Developer felt the controversy around the character was one of several around that time that represented "both a newfound mindfulness of possibly sexist design trends in games as well as an unwillingness among some gamers" to recognize what she saw as a growing female demographic in gaming. Meanwhile, the discussion around the Sorceress and her design was a factor cited in the creation of "Boob Jam", a game jam created by 1UP.com writer Jenn Frank that aimed to illustrate to men issues with women's breasts and help women themselves be more comfortable with their own bodies.
