= Odin Sphere =

2007 video game

- North American box art for Odin Sphere, showing the main cast and key supporting characters
- Developer: Vanillaware
- Publishers: JP/NA: Atlus; PAL: Square Enix; PAL: NIS America (Leifthrasir)
- Directors: George Kamitani; Kentaro Ohnishi (Leifthrasir)
- Producers: Akiyasu Yamamoto; George Kamitani (Leifthrasir)
- Programmer: Kentaro Ohnishi
- Artist: George Kamitani
- Writer: George Kamitani
- Composers: Masaharu Iwata; Hitoshi Sakimoto; Mitsuhiro Kaneda; Kimihiro Abe; Manabu Namiki
- Platforms: Odin Sphere; PlayStation 2; Leifthrasir; PlayStation 3; PlayStation 4; PlayStation Vita
- Release: May 17, 2007: Odin Sphere; JP: May 17, 2007; NA: May 22, 2007; AU: March 13, 2008; EU: March 14, 2008 Leifthrasir; JP: January 14, 2016; NA: June 7, 2016; PAL: June 24, 2016
- Genre: Action role-playing
- Mode: Single-player

Odin Sphere (Note: Ōdin Sufia (Japanese: オーディンスフィア)) is an action role-playing game developed by Vanillaware for the PlayStation 2. It was published by Atlus (Japan and North America) in 2007, and by Square Enix (Australia and Europe) in 2008. A remake, titled Odin Sphere Leifthrasir, was released on PlayStation 3, PlayStation 4, and PlayStation Vita in 2016: Atlus handled publishing duties in Japan and North America, while NIS America published the title in PAL territories.

Using a two-dimensional side-scrolling perspective, gameplay focuses on a beat em up-style fighting system while incorporating role-playing elements — Leifthrasir expands upon and refines these elements. The story, shared between both versions, follows five characters on the fantasy continent of Erion during a war between the nations of Ragnanival and Ringford over a weapon called the Crystallization Cauldron, and their roles in the Armageddon, a catastrophe which will destroy Erion.

The game was conceived by George Kamitani as first a sequel and then a spiritual successor to the 1997 Sega Saturn title Princess Crown. Development began in 2004 after the official formation of Vanillaware. The story was based around the concept of a Valkyrie princess. The scenario and world design incorporated Norse mythology, the works of William Shakespeare, fairy tales and early video games. 2D graphics were chosen over 3D graphics as Kamitani felt the style was stagnating, which necessitated presenting cutscenes as if on a stage rather than using traditional cinematography. Leifthrasir began development in 2013 as a means of addressing the issues both players and staff had with the original game while keeping the story intact. The music for both versions was composed by a team from Basiscape, led by company founder Hitoshi Sakimoto.

Prior to Atlus picking up the title, Vanillaware had encountered difficulties finding a publisher due to Kamitani's sparse record as a developer. Completed in 2006, Odin Sphere was delayed into the following year so it would not compete with Atlus' own titles. The localization was handled by Atlus USA, and proved challenging in multiple areas. Upon release, it garnered a positive reception from video game journalists: praise was given to its story, visuals and old-school gameplay, with criticism focused on its inventory system and framerate issues. Leifthrasir was praised for its improved performance and reworked mechanics. The game was a commercial success, contributing to the rise of Vanillaware as a developer.

== Gameplay ==
Screenshots from Odin Sphere (above) and its remake Leifthrasir (below), featuring player character Velvet. While basic gameplay is similar, Leifthrasir has multiple additional elements in addition to visual upgrades.

Odin Sphere is a two-dimensional (2D) side-scrolling action role-playing game where the player takes control of five different characters across six playable scenarios. Areas within levels are circular stages allowing movement left or right with exits leading to other areas; the main goal in each area is to eliminate all enemies and proceed to the next area. Combat—which uses a beat em up-style battle system—takes place within these areas, and revolves around the player character using a combination of physical attacks and Psypher skills, skills tied to each character's magical weapon. Combination attacks are triggered by attacking enemies continuously. Jumping can be used to reach airborne enemies within stages. At the end of each battle, grades are awarded based on the battle time, damage taken from enemies, and the amount of damage dealt. The amount of in-game currency the player receives as a reward after each battle depends on the battle grade.

Rather than the typical experience point-driven character growth of most role-playing games, each characters' abilities is linked to their Psyphers, and the amount of damage characters can inflict depends upon the strength of their Psypher. These two elements are upgraded by collecting Phozons, spirit energy released from defeated enemies. Phozons fill a magic meter, which is used to trigger special skills. All physical attacks drain a character's POW (power) gauge, and if depleted entirely the character must rest until the gauge refills. Tied to Phozons and leveling is a farming system, where seeds planted and fueled with Phozons provide meals which raise a character's level, boosting their health and abilities. Food can be grown in the wild using seeds, but later two restaurants are available where prepared meals can be eaten. Various elements, such as food and material, can be used together using an Alchemy system which allows for the creation of potions with various effects, from dealing damage to healing the main character.

Leifthrasir adds to and augments the existing features. These include new battle arenas, and new vertical areas within environments to create platforming segments. Characters now have exclusive abilities and elemental affinities, such as Gwendolyn having access to ice attacks. Battle rankings now depend upon skills used and time taken rather than a quick clearing of arenas, with items as well as money being awarded for high scores. The POW system is redesigned so that only special attacks consume POW with the exception of one character. Some special attacks also consume a portion of phozons collected in battle. Each character also possesses skill and ability trees, which are unlocked with Phozons stored during and after battles. While skill trees are unlocked with Phozons, abilities are upgraded with Ability Points. The food and growing systems remain roughly similar, while the Alchemy system is streamlined. Leifthrasir also includes a "Classic" mode, which switches from the redesigned look of Leifthrasir to the original version.

== Synopsis ==
=== Setting and characters ===
Odin Sphere is set on the fictional continent of Erion, which is divided into multiple nations scattered across the land. The two main nations are the warrior land of Ragnanival, and the forest-bound Fairy Kingdom of Ringford, separated by a wasteland that was once the kingdom of Valentine. At the game's opening, Ragnanival is ruled by the Demon Lord Odin (オーダイン, Ōdain), and Ringford is ruled by the Fairy Queen Elfaria (エルファリア, Erufaria) with help from her nephew Melvin (メルヴィン, Meruvuin). The other nations include the neutral land of Titania; the volcano-bound Fire Kingdom ruled by the one male resident King Onyx (オニキス, Onikisu); and the Netherworld, the land of the dead where natural crystals grow, ruled by the undead Queen Odette (オデット, Odetto). Two key elements in the game are psyphers, weapons incorporating crystals made from phozon life energy; and the Crystallization Cauldron, a weapon created by Valentine that crafts crystals by absorbing phozons from the land. A driving force of the plot is the tale of the Armageddon, a foretold catastrophe in which Erion is destroyed and the survivors rule the new world.

Many years prior to the game's events, the world was controlled by King Valentine (バレンタイン, Barentain), who ruled the kingdom bearing his name. Originally a kind man, a spell to bring his people prosperity drained his goodness, causing him to turn into a vicious dictator who declared war on the rest of Erion. During his conquests, the Cauldron went wild and destroyed the kingdom in a single night — everyone was cursed and transformed into Pookas, while Valentine's kingdom was reduced to a wasteland. In the aftermath of Valentine's fall, Ragnanival and Ringford had become Erion's most powerful nations, while the other nations have become weak in comparison. At the game's opening, Ragnanival and Ringford are at war over possession of the Cauldron in the wasteland of Valentine, as each see the Cauldron as too dangerous for the other to possess.

The story is told from the perspective of a young girl named Alice reading a series of books in her attic, with five initial storylines or "books" playing out between the five main characters and overlapping at multiple points. The five main protagonists are Gwyndolyn (グウェンドリン, Guwendorin), a Valkyrie and daughter to the Demon Lord Odin who has lived for years in the shadow of her sister Griselda (グリゼルダ, Gurizeruda); Cornelius (コルネリウス, Koruneriusu), the prince of Titania turned into a Pooka; Mercedes (メルセデス, Merusedesu), daughter of Elfaria and later the reluctant queen of Ringford; the "Shadow Knight" Oswald (オズワルド, Ozuwarudo), a dark knight in service to Ringford who was found abandoned as a baby and adopted by Melvin; and Velvet (ベルベット, Berubetto), a survivor from the Kingdom of Valentine who hides her identity as Odin's illegitimate daughter and has been dubbed the "Forest Witch". Other key characters outside the royalty of Erion's surviving nations include the Three Wise Men, a group manipulating Erion's nations to fulfill the ancient prophecies surrounding the Armageddon; Ingway (イングヴェイ, Inguvuei), Velvet's brother who like Velvet retained his humanity and was key to the disaster that consumed his kingdom; and King Valentine, having escaped the Netherworld as an insane revenant bent on destroying Erion.

=== Plot ===
The game's opening sees Ringford holding the Cauldron and its controlling ring Titrel, having been given Titrel by Ingway as part of his vengeance against Odin. Elfaria is ultimately killed by Odin, who takes Titrel from her. Velvet steals it in turn and gives it to the dragon Wagner, hoping that this would prevent the Cauldron being used. Her lover Cornelius is meanwhile changed into a Pooka by Ingway and thrown into the Netherworld, escaping with the aid of his grandfather Gallon. He learns that the people of Valentine share his curse, and is embroiled in both the Pookas' efforts to collect wish-granting coins to reverse their condition and his attempts to save Velvet from danger. The Three Wise Men are attempting to fulfill the prophecies of the Armageddon — all but one Wise Man are killed during the course of the story, while the third Beldor is afflicted with the Pooka's curse and gains subsequent immortality. Cornelius rescues Velvet from their clutches, and despite his fears she reaffirms her love for him in his new form. Several characters also encounter King Valentine, who continues to be tormented by memories of murdering Velvet's mother in a rage — as part of his scheme to trigger the Armageddon, he hatches the dragon Leventhan.

Gwyndolyn's story focuses on the time after her sister Griselda is killed in battle — having always come second in her father's eyes, Gwyndolyn tries hard to impress him, but must ultimately defy him when his general Brigan attempts to undermine him. Gwyndolyn is placed in an enchanted sleep for her defiance, to be woken and fall in love with the first man who kisses her. After being spirited to the lands of Onyx by the Three Wise Men, Gwyndolyn's story becomes intertwined with Oswald's. Oswald is involved in an attempted coup against Mercedes by Melvin and is taken by Odette as payment for the power Melvin infused into Oswald's psypher. He is then used by Odin to take Titrel from Wagner by force, but ultimately rebels and rescues Gwyndolyn from Onyx after learning that Odin did not enchant her, giving Titrel to the awoken Gwyndolyn as a gift. Gwyndolyn, initially defiant, begins to fall in love, but is tricked into giving Titrel to Odin. Broken hearted and believing Gwyndolyn despises him due to her love being solely due to Odins spell, Oswald allows Odette to take him. Mercedes' story runs parallel to the others, chronicling her efforts to become queen in the wake of her mother's death and Melvin's attempted coup, aided by Ingway after he is turned into a frog by the Three Wise Men. With the help of the dwarf smith Brom, she refashions her psypher into a weapon powerful enough to destroy Odin's psypher, winning a battle against him and taking Titrel. She also breaks Ingway's curse, and the two grow attached to each other. Titrel is subsequently stolen by Gwyndolyn, who uses it as a bargaining chip to rescue Oswald from Odette, who is killed by Gwyndolyn. Initially torn between love for Oswald and duty to Odin, Gwyndolyn defies her father and leaves with Oswald and Titrel, which now acts as a symbol of their love. Odin is then accosted by Ingway and Velvet; Ingway transforms into a monster in an unsuccessful attempt to kill Odin, then Velvet and Ingway are rescued by Cornelius.

The sixth book shows the advent of Armageddon — King Valentine activates the Cauldron and uses it to absorb phozons from the land to feed the growth of Leventhan. Ingway attempts to destroy the Cauldron using his cursed form, but he falls under the control of Beldor, who has also led the monstrous Gallon and the Netherworld army into Erion. In the ensuing chaos, Odin is killed, and Onyx decides to destroy Ringford to avert a prophecy of his death at the "World Tree". The story then divides between the main characters' battles in the wake of these events, with different endings playing out depending on who is matched with which battle; Erion's rebirth or absolute destruction depending on whether or not the choices are correct. In the canon series of events, Cornelius defeats Ingway and Beldor and is rescued by Velvet, who learns from the dying Ingway that the Cauldron can be used to reverse the destruction; Oswald defeats Gallon, learning that he is Gallon's grandson by his banished son Edgar and thus Titanian royalty; Mercedes, whose true name is "Yggdrasil" (World Tree), finds Ingway's corpse and dies in battle after fatally wounding Onyx; Velvet stops the Cauldron without destroying its core, but King Valentine curses the Cauldron before waking Leventhan and killing himself by jumping into its path; and Gwyndolyn kills Leventhan before it can destroy Erion, losing her wings in the process.

Having finished the books, Alice finds a magical coin on the front cover of the sixth book. Called downstairs by her mother, she misses seeing Cornelius and Velvet, both in Pooka form, take the coin and leave a seventh book. In this book, Gwyndolyn is rescued by Oswald, who carries her to the Cauldron before collapsing. Velvet and Cornelius are there, and Velvet finds Titrel on Gwyndolyn's hand. Using Titrel, Velvet turns their psyphers back into phozons to power the Cauldron and revives the land, turning into a Pooka due to Valentine's curse. Oswald and Gwyndolyn bear witness to the rebirth of the land, and become the ancestors to the new humanity; Mercedes is reincarnated as its World Tree. In a special ending set thousands of years after the events of Odin Sphere, Cornelius and Velvet have successfully gathered all the coins and use their combined power to break their curse. A post-credits scene shows an unseen author, who is writing a book called "Odin Sphere", talking with a merchant while the main characters pass by. A new scene in Leifthrasir shows Ingway's spirit resting within the World Tree's roots, reunited with the reincarnated Mercedes.

== Development ==
Odin Sphere was the brainchild of George Kamitani, a video game designer who had worked on Princess Crown, a 1997 Japan-exclusive side-scrolling action RPG developed by Atlus for the Sega Saturn. The game was developed by Vanillaware, a studio created by former Atlus staff including Kamitani to create successor projects to Princess Crown. Initially founded as "Puraguru" in 2002 when it worked on Fantasy Earth Zero, the company changed its name in 2004 when the staff moved to Kansai. It was during his time working on Fantasy Earth Zero that Kamitani met the founding members of Vanillaware. Odin Sphere, which began development in 2004, was designed as a spiritual successor to Princess Crown, specifically evolving the multi-layered narrative style of the original game. The game's programmer was Kentaro Ohnishi, one of the founding members of Vanillaware. The producer was Atlus staff member Akiyasu Yamamoto. According to Ohnishi, the project started as a direct sequel to Princess Crown, but later became a spiritual successor which incorporated multiple nods to the original game. The reason it changed was that the initial plan for the Princess Crown sequel was to have used 3D visuals, which would have looked wrong with Kamitani's character designs and artwork.

Development was difficult for the team due to its small size and hardware difficulties when trying to fit high-quality artwork onto the PlayStation 2 (PS2), resulting in compromises in the visual quality the team had initially planned for the project. This pressure lasted right up to release, as Ohnishi needed to do emergency work to fix game-breaking bugs. Development was completed in 2006. Vanillaware had great difficulty securing a publisher and the necessary funding for the project, as Kamitani's last project had been the unsuccessful Princess Crown over seven years before. They made unsuccessful pitches to multiple publishers before the title was finally accepted by Atlus, although there was some doubt as to whether it would prove a success. While the game was completed in 2006, Atlus delayed its release into 2007 as they did not want it to cannibalize the market for their other titles, particularly Persona 3. Odin Sphere was first revealed in February 2007, three months prior to release. Odin Sphere was eventually released on May 17.

=== Scenario and design ===
The initial concept for Odin Sphere was of a story revolving around a Valkyrie princess, inspired by Kamitani's wish to emulate the protagonist of Princess Crown and hearing at second hand about planning at tri-Ace for Valkyrie Profile 2: Silmeria, which involved Norse mythology and featured a princess as its main protagonist. Kamitani's Valkyrie protagonist, who would become Gwyndolin, was created before the rest of the game's world and story were finalized. Working from this initial idea and its roots in Norse mythology, Kamitani began writing a romantic storyline for Gwyndolin and Oswald as the central narrative, basing it on Der Ring des Nibelungen by Richard Wagner. He then added further elements inspired by the works of William Shakespeare and traditional European fairy tales. The other narratives focused on different themes: Mercedes' storyline focused on her maturation into a queen, Velvet's story focused on resolving a mystery, while Cornelius' story narrative modeled after traditional fairy tales as a homage to the early PC game Marchen Veil. Oswald was based directly on Siegfried, the protagonist of Der Ring des Nibelungen.

Odin Sphere was Kamitani's first time writing a large scenario mostly by himself. He began writing the scenario in July 2005, and while he was intended to be done by August, the writing lasted until February 2006. His original plan was something like a straight adaptation of Der Ring des Nibelungen and its associated Norse myths, but he reworked it to have more original features to incorporate more action while using its loose chronology to maintain a myth-like atmosphere. As with his other projects, Kamitani included strong female characters, as he felt a woman pushed into summoning the courage to fight deserved victory. There were plans to create backstory elements for characters like Odin and an extra book focusing on Ingway, but the negative impact those elements would have resulted in them being cut. Originally planned to have just an hour and a half of voiced dialogue, the final total was over five hours. Due to the large volume of story, dividing the narrative and dialogue into cutscenes took six months rather than the planned three.

Kamitani acted as art and character designer for the game, with additional art for elements such as food provided by Takehiro "Shigatake" Shiga. So as to distance the appearance of Gwyndolin and other Valkyries in Odin Sphere from the Valkyries of the Valkyrie Profile series, Kamitani modeled their outfits after ballet tutus. The character Mercedes was a fairy version of Gradriel De Valendia, the main protagonist of Princess Crown. Velvet's design was described as an "Arabic Little Red Riding Hood". More sensual elements of his female character designs came about through chance rather than deliberate design. A few monster designs were recycled from Princess Crown. The artwork was created at full scale, then shrunk down to fit within the PS2 hardware specifications.

Despite the general move to 3D graphics in the gaming industry, the team decided to use 2D graphics, as Kamitani felt the style was stagnating. The use of 2D graphics meant that traditional cinematographic camera work for cutscenes was impossible to achieve, so the team instead modeled them after scenes from a stage production. This style was also chosen due to the story's Shakespearean atmosphere. The character graphics were hand-drawn in a process Kamitani dubbed "tebineri", or hand-shaping. The toolset used to create the graphic animations was heavily inspired by the similar animation style used for Adobe Flash products. An element that proved troublesome was character movement, which was hard to make behave within the limited hardware specifications of the PS2. A cited example was how Velvet's breasts jiggle slightly when she stops moving. This was intended for more female characters, but due to the hardware limitations it was restricted to Velvet.

=== Localization ===
The game was localized for the West by Atlus USA. The project leader was Bill Alexander, the lead translator was Sammy Matsushima, while dialogue editing was handled by Mike Meeker. As with their other localizations such as for the Persona series, the team tried to stay faithful to the original text. This proved easier than for the Persona series as its fictional setting meant there were no cultural in-jokes that would not be understood outside Japan. The localization took place from 2006 to 2007: the project was an unusual one for Atlus, as it was an entirely new intellectual property from a studio that was still little known in the West. When tasked with localizing the game for Western markets, the team were told that the game had a Shakespearean feel, so Matsushima created a script that reflected that: with the concept of a play in mind, the dialogue was written to give a noble feel to the characters, in addition to fairy tale elements fitting in with its frame story of a girl reading books. For his part, Meeker read King Lear and A Midsummer Night's Dream to find the correct style for his writing, in addition to reading Beowulf to properly capture the narrative's darker elements.

The localization proved more challenging than other Atlus projects for multiple reasons. As the characters' text bubbles were designed to use Japanese kanji characters—which compress a lot of information into a single symbol in a way impossible in the English alphabet—each text bubble had to be individually resized and sometimes shifted so they would not intrude on other elements within scenes. The sheer amount of voice acting in the game meant that dubbing took far longer than other similar projects, running past its projected time and requiring Atlus staff members to voice very minor characters to save time. The main characters were a major focus due to the storytelling style of multiple interlinked narratives, with each character's personal growth needing to be reflected in their voice performance. This was particularly true of Mercedes. The auto-scrolling nature of dialogue, which moved along at a set pace rather than through the player's button prompts, meant that performances needed to be correctly timed and balanced to the varying paces at which the actors read their lines. This led to lines being modified during recording to keep within schedule. During the last stages, the team needed to rerecord some lines of dialogue, but to keep the localization in budget and on schedule it was done outside a professional recording studio, resulting in an audible drop in quality.

Odin Sphere was released in North America on May 22, 2007, less than a week after the game's Japanese release. In Europe, it was released on March 14, 2008, by Square Enix. Available with in-game text in English, French, German, Spanish and Italian, it was the first non-Square Enix title the company released in Europe. The European version also included technical improvements that allowed the game to run better than the North American version. It was also published in Australia on March 13. The Japanese voice track was included in the game as a special extra feature for fans of anime. The localization process was timed so that the Japanese and North American releases were days apart rather than months, which put extra pressure due to some promotional assets still being in development in Japan.

=== Odin Sphere Leifthrasir ===
Odin Sphere Leifthrasir, (Note: Ōdin Sufia Reivusurashiru (オーディンスフィア レイヴスラシル; stylized as Odin Sphere Leifþrasir)) a remake of Odin Sphere for PlayStation 3, PlayStation 4 and PlayStation Vita, began development in late 2013 alongside publisher Atlus changing ownership from Index Corporation to Sega. Ohnishi acted as the remake's director, while Kamitani produced. Atlus initially wanted to create a followup to Vanillaware's recent successful title Dragon's Crown, but when Odin Sphere came up in conversations, it was decided to work on that as it was both Vanillaware's first project and their first Atlus-published title. Initially planned to be an upgraded port, the availability of development resources allowed for the development of a full remake. The aim by Vanillaware was to keep the well-received story and visual design intact, while improving the RPG elements and ironing out technical issues that were criticized at the time. The game's title Leifthrasir was in reference to Líf and Lífþrasir, the two humans in Norse mythology who survive Ragnarok and repopulate the new world. The "Leifthrasir" spelling was chosen over the more common "Lifthrasir" as the former sounded better. It was also written with the Old Norse letter "þ" incorporated into the title.

There were a large number of changes made to the game. Additional stages and divisions between battle and exploration were created; defense and dodge actions were added for characters; extensive vertical plains were added to environments; enemy and boss AI was redesigned and refined; additional enemies and subbosses were included; a new difficulty level was added; and the POW gauge, inventory and Psypher systems were redesigned. At the time Odin Sphere was made, it was fully intended to be a successor to Princess Crown, but Vanillaware had since become better known for fast-paced action over simple side-scrolling combat. The gameplay was thus adjusted so that it would be familiar to players of the later and more refined Muramasa: The Demon Blade and Dragon's Crown. Kamitani later commented that he would have made extensive changes such as removing the alchemy system, but other staff members—who were fans of Odin Sphere and were employed after the game's release—successfully pushed to retain and improve rather than remove the original features. According to Ohnishi, how to adjust the gameplay was difficult for the team to decide: elements included the way health and magic energies were raised separately, and how the alchemy system worked. With this in mind, these systems were adjusted so they would be more accessible for people with varied playing styles. The revamped system drew from the team's work on Dragon's Crown. There was no original story content created, although additional text archives were created and the existing text was rewritten in places. The ability to skip story sequences, unavailable in the original release, was included. It was also decided not to have the different sections be playable out of order, as that would negatively impact the story.

The high-definition upgrade was not as difficult as it might have been as all the art assets had been created in high definition and reduced for the PS2 hardware. Other aspects of the visuals, such as character faces, needed to be redrawn by Kamitani as they remained in low definition. There were also graphic elements remade as the team considered them to be rather poor quality when compared to their current work. Added shadow effects were created, but special parameters needed to be set as there were no 3D environments to use as reference. The 2D perspective also meant that the way enemies behaved needed to be adjusted, so they would not attack the player character while still off screen. In general, the overall graphical quality was improved, the resolution was increased, and the aspect ratio was changed from the original 4:3 to 16:9. The shift to 16:9 meant that character models needed to be re-positioned so as not to leave blank spaces on either side of the central scene. As they needed to analyse the original software to make such changes but had lost the original software used to create the cutscenes, they needed to hurriedly create alternate editing software that ran on a PC. In addition to changes to scenery and model positioning, the text font was resized to match the larger screen and the text bubbles were smoothed out.

Leifthrasir was first announced in July 2015, along with its planned release platforms. The game was published in Japan on January 14, 2016. In North America, it was released on June 7. While minimal work was done by Atlus' localization team for the remake, the amateur voice acting was replaced with professional performances. In Europe, it was published on June 24 by NIS America. NIS America also published Leifthrasir on June 24 in Australia and New Zealand. Leifthrasir ended up being the last title published during the partnership between Atlus and NIS America, with the two parting following NIS America's growing dissatisfaction with Atlus' behavior with publishing partners since being purchased by Sega.

=== Music ===
The music of Odin Sphere was composed by a team from music company Basiscape. The team was led by company founder Hitoshi Sakimoto, and included Masaharu Iwata, Mitsuhiro Kaneda, Kimihiro Abe and Manabu Namiki. Sakimoto and Iwata created the majority of the soundtrack. Kamitani brought Basiscape and Sakimoto aboard as they had struck up an acquaintance while working on Fantasy Earth Zero. He supported Kamitani's team during the more troubling periods of production and was apparently retained for what Kamitani considered a too-small fee when compared to the final music quality. When Odin Sphere began development, Kamitani contacted Basiscape at once. The team worked from the concept of Norse mythology interpreted by Japanese, aiming for musical impact rather than cultural accuracy. The aim was to emulate the game's Shakespearean inspiration and evoke the feeling of opening a Harry Potter novel for the first time. The music production took two to three years overall.

When creating the music, particularly the main theme, Sakimoto tried to capture the feelings of the characters struggling to determine their futures and face the truth of their situations. The Celtic-styled "Shanachie" version, which played during the end credits, was performed by Kansai-based band Shanachie. Kaneda created the boss track "A Hard Fight and then Hope", wanting a theme that was indicative of the main characters fighting beings larger than them. Commenting on his track "The Hero's Triumphant Return", Iwata aimed at creating a hopeful and triumphant song for key story segments. The main theme's lyrics were written by Nami Uehara, who arranged the main theme's "Shanachie" version. It was translated into French by Maryvonne Nagel Okamoto. All versions of the main theme were sung by Noriko Kawahara.

Odin Sphere Original Soundtrack was released on October 14, 2007, by Five Records. Additional orchestral arrangements included on the disk were performed by Eminence Symphony Orchestra. A reprint was issued by Basiscape Records on April 18, 2012. Upon release, it reached #171 in the Oricon charts, remaining in the charts for one week. The album received positive reviews from music critics.

Leifthrasir made use of rearranged pieces, in addition to new tracks. These new tracks, 25 in all, were created for the new battle arenas. The music was composed by Sakimoto, Kaneda, Iwata, Abe, Namiki, Kazuki Higashihara, Azusa Chiba and Yoshimi Kudo. Uehara returned as arranger alongside Sakimoto, Kaneda, Iwata, Kudo, Higashihara and Chiba. During his work on the project, Sakimoto felt that the score needed minimal adjustment despite it being ten years since it was created. Shanachie returned to perform a rearranged version of the theme song. Vocals this time were performed by Rena and Miwa Horio. Odin Sphere Leifthrasir Original Soundtrack was released on January 14, 2016. In addition to the songs included in Leifthrasir, the soundtrack included five additional remixes of existing themes. The albums for both Odin Sphere and Leifthrasir were released worldwide through streaming services in June 2025.

== Reception ==
Reception

Aggregate score
Aggregator	Score		
Aggregator	PS Vita	PS2	PS4
Metacritic	93/100	83/100	87/100

Review scores
Publication	Score		
Publication	PS Vita	PS2	PS4
1Up.com	N/A	A-	N/A
Destructoid	N/A	N/A	9.5/10
Eurogamer	N/A	7/10	N/A
Famitsu	36/40	32/40	36/40
Game Informer	N/A	8.5/10	8/10
GameSpot	N/A	7.6/10	8/10
IGN	9.5/10	8.8/10	9.5/10
Play	N/A	10/10	N/A

Odin Sphere scored 83/100 on the aggregate site Metacritic based on 49 reviews, denoting a generally positive reception and being the 7th best-reviewed PS2 game of the year. Editors of Famitsu Weekly magazine gave the Japanese version a 32 out of 40 cumulative score, earning it the publication's Silver Award, with critics praising the title's graphics and "intuitive" controls, but also remarked that its difficulty was high and many areas of the game looked too similar. Play Magazine awarded it a perfect score, stating that "in the case of Odin Sphere, [we are] confident that this is a perfect game, and that anyone who comes to it will derive the same", praising its 2D graphics, detailed storyline, and unique combat system as high points. Western reviewers generally praised the game highly: the story was cited as both compelling and well-told, with it being compared to the works of Shakespeare and the A Song of Ice and Fire book series. The gameplay systems and controls were generally praised, but the criticism was laid upon elements of repetition in its combat and progression, and its inventory system. The graphics were unanimously praised, with many comparing it to classic storybooks. A recurring criticism was slow-down during crowded battle sequences. (Note: 1UP.com, Eurogamer, Game Informer, GameSpot, IGN.)

The PS4 version of Leifthrasir received an aggregate score of 87/100 based on 49 reviews, becoming the 15th best-reviewed title of 2016. The Vita version received a score of 93/100 based on five reviews. Reviewing Leifthrasir, Famitsu praised the increased smoothness and battle frequency, noting that the title still felt fresh despite being the remake of a 2007 title. They also praised the graphical upgrade and its effect on the artwork. Critics generally agreed that Leifthrasir was an improvement on the original game, praising its technical performance, lack of the original's framerate problems, graphical upgrade, and redesigned gameplay systems. Despite this, reviewers noted that the game could get repetitive, with a few noting incumbent issues with its story presentation. (Note: Destructoid, Game Informer, GameSpot, IGN.)

=== Sales ===
In its debut week in Japan, Odin Sphere sold 59,248 units, reaching #3 in the charts. It went up to second place in the charts the following week. Sales capped out at 96,280 units in the region by the end of 2007. Upon release in North America, the game reached the top of sales charts and remained there into the following week. It was among the top 20 best-selling titles in North America during its debut month, and was the only title in that ranking not to be a sequel or belong to an established brand. Atlus kept their traditionally convervative sales expectations for the game, but critical and fan reception prompted it to quickly sell out. According to a later statement by Atlus' parent company, Odin Sphere had sold 350,000 units worldwide during the 2007 to 2008 period, placing it among the PS2's "Greatest Hits" line. Upon its release as a PS2 Classic on the PlayStation Network in October 2011, the game was the best-selling out of five concurrent releases including God Hand, and reached #15 in the PSN charts for that month. As of 2015, the game has sold over 500,000 copies worldwide. The financial success of the game for Vanillaware was contributed by Kamitani to high royalty payments set by Atlus as part of the publishing contract.

Leifthrasir reached the top of sales charts, claiming the spot Monster Hunter Generations which had held the position for three weeks on end. Sales were strong compared to the original version: selling 43,394 units on PlayStation Vita at #1, 42,263 units on PlayStation 4 at #2, and 9,771 units on PlayStation 3 at #10. All versions of Leifthrasir sold a total of 95,428, and marked an improvement in sales for Atlus after low sales for Tokyo Mirage Sessions ♯FE the previous month. Upon release in Western territories, the Vita version reached #2 on the PSN chart. According to a report by Virtuous and IDG Consulting, Leifthrasir sold over two million units by March 2024, one of the only two remakes released within ten years of the original game to do so.

=== Awards ===
Odin Sphere became the recipient of several website and magazine distinctions, particularly during IGN's "Best of 2007" PlayStation 2 awards, where the game won "Best Artistic Design", "Best Story", "Most Innovative Design", and "Best RPG". It was a runner-up in the PlayStation 2 categories for "Best Original Score" and "PS2 Game of the Year", additionally earning its developer Vanillaware "Best Developer" along with GrimGrimoire, also released in 2007. It was favorably mentioned by multiple editors in RPGFan's "Games of 2007" awards, while it was in third place for the 2007 RPGamer Award for best PS2 title behind GrimGrimoire and Persona 3. The game also won GamesRadar's "Pure Beauty" award during their Platinum Chalice Awards, with the website remarking that "the graphics here are so artistic it's hypnotic, if not literally breathtaking".

== Legacy ==
The delayed release of Odin Sphere led to issues with the company: they needed to start other projects to keep their company going, leading to the development of GrimGrimoire. The development of GrimGrimoire drained the company's funds, forcing Kamitani to take out a flexible loan of 20 million yen to keep the company afloat and fund development for their next projects, in addition to finding new publishers as Atlus refused to take any more of Vanillaware's products until they had seen how Odin Sphere performed commercially. Nippon Ichi Software would handle GrimGrimoire, while Marvelous Entertainment accepted their next project, Muramasa: The Demon Blade for the Wii. The commercial success of Odin Sphere both enabled the development of Muramasa: The Demon Blade and cleared Kamitani's debt. In tandem with their other titles, Odin Sphere helped establish Vanillaware as a respected developer.
