= Muramasa: The Demon Blade =

2009 action role-playing video game

- North American Wii cover art
- Developer: Vanillaware
- Publishers: Wii: JP: Marvelous Entertainment; NA: Ignition Entertainment; EU: Rising Star Games; Vita: JP: Marvelous AQL; NA/EU: Aksys Games; Revenant Blades; Marvelous
- Directors: George Kamitani; Wataru Nakanishi (Revenant Blades)
- Producers: Yoshifumi Hashimoto; Makoto Shioda (Revenant Blades)
- Programmer: Kentaro Ohnishi
- Artists: Yasuhiro Fujiwara: Yasuo Shirai; Takehiro Shiga; Kouichi Maenou; Ine Kawazu
- Writer: George Kamitani
- Composers: Hitoshi Sakimoto: Yoshimi Kudo; Noriyuki Kamikura; Mitsuhiro Kaneda; Kimihiro Abe; Azusa Chiba; Masaharu Iwata
- Platforms: Wii, PlayStation Vita, PlayStation 5, Nintendo Switch, Nintendo Switch 2, Windows
- Release: April 9, 2009: Wii; JP: April 9, 2009; NA: September 8, 2009; EU: November 27, 2009; AU: December 3, 2009 Muramasa Rebirth Vita; JP: March 28, 2013; NA: June 25, 2013; EU: October 16, 2013; AU: October 16, 2013 Muramasa: Revenant Blades PS5, NS, NS2, PC; WW: February 4, 2027
- Genre: Action role-playing
- Mode: Single-player

Muramasa: The Demon Blade (Note: Japanese: 朧村正, Hepburn: Oboro Muramasa; "Hazy Muramasa") is a 2009 action role-playing game developed by Vanillaware and published for the Wii by Marvelous Entertainment (Japan), Ignition Entertainment (North America), and Rising Star Games (Europe). Set in the Edo period during the reign of shogun Tokugawa Tsunayoshi, conflicts have arisen over ownership of the Demon Blades, samurai swords forged by Muramasa Sengo that bring tragedy and madness upon their wielders. The story follows two protagonists related to this conflict: Momohime, a woman who is possessed by the spirit of vengeful rōnin Jinkuro Izuna; and Kisuke, an amnesiac ninja on the run for a forgotten crime who is tied up with the tragedy that destroyed Momohime's family. Using a 2D side-scrolling perspective, the gameplay revolves around a beat 'em up fighting system, while incorporating role-playing elements such as leveling and questing.

The concept work for Muramasa began during the middle of development on Odin Sphere. Along with improving on the action gameplay over Odin Sphere, a great deal of effort was put into making the game's setting authentic to the period. Director and writer George Kamitani created the story based on kabuki theatre, incorporating Japanese folklore and Buddhist theology. When the game was released in the West, it retained its Japanese voicetrack to preserve its atmosphere. It was released to moderate sales and positive reviews. Praise focused on its art design and music, with the gameplay often described as fun but shallow, and its story was faulted for its structure

A PlayStation Vita version, titled Muramasa Rebirth in the West, was published in 2013 by Marvelous AQL in Japan and Aksys Games in English territories. Rebirth was supported by downloadable content in the form of Genroku Legends, four self-contained stories based on Japanese folklore. The game featured new music, and a redone localization. Rebirth met with strong sales, and a similar reception to its original version. Another version, Muramasa: Revenant Blades, is set for release worldwide in 2027 for PlayStation 5, Nintendo Switch, Nintendo Switch 2 and Windows. Published by Marvelous, it includes all the content of Muramasa Rebirth, upgraded graphics and added gameplay options, and another new localization with an English dub.

== Gameplay ==
Player character Momohime fights enemies in a random encounter.

Muramasa is a two-dimensional (2D) side-scrolling action role-playing game set on the main Japanese island of Honshu during the Edo period. Players take control of two characters with similar gameplay abilities. Navigation takes place through hand-drawn 2D side-scrolling environments reminiscent of Japanese artwork of the period, and can enter towns to talk with non-playable characters (NPCs) and buy items such as health restoratives and accept quests. An additional cooking element allows the characters to cook meals using materials gathered during exploration: meals grant temporary character boosts, and fill a "fullness" meter that limits how much food a character can eat.

Combat comes in the form of both avoidable random encounters and scripted fights where the camera is fixed within the fighting area: enemies and bosses are primarily drawn from Japanese folklore and mythology. Battles are triggered only when enemies are near, with the player character otherwise keeping their weapons sheathed. In combat, characters attack and guard using a single-button prompt, while another button accesses items such as healing potions. Continuously attacking triggers combos. Different moves include sword slashes combined with directional buttons, which have different effects such as throwing an enemy into the air with an upward slash. Additional offensive items such as smoke bombs are acquired during the course of the game. At the end of each battle, experience points are awarded to the player character depending on how fast the battle was finished: leveling up increases a character's health, stats, and the amount of damage inflicted upon enemies.

Weapons are distinguished into two categories, Blade (katana) and Long Blade (nōdachi): Blades are fast, while Long Blades are slower and deal higher damage. Three blades can be equipped at any one time: each blade has its own stats, determining the amount of damage that can be inflicted. When blocking or using a blade's Secret Art special move, its Soul Power gauge depletes: if emptied, the sword breaks and its offensive abilities are drastically reduced. When sheathed, the Soul Power regenerates. Soul Power can be gathered in various locations to restore Soul Power and the character's health. There are 108 blades that can be collected and forged in-game: forging blades requires Soul Power and "spirit", and each blade has a level cap determining when it can be forged. Weapon forging is governed by a weapon-based skill tree.

== Synopsis ==
=== Setting and characters ===
Muramasa takes place on Honshu, the main island of the Japanese archipelago, with its overall style and setting drawing heavily upon Japanese folklore and mythology. It is set in the Genroku period, itself within the larger Edo period, during the reign of the shogun Tokugawa Tsunayoshi. Tsunayoshi's thirst for power has created conflict around ownership of the Demon Blades, samurai swords forged by the legendary swordsmith Muramasa Sengo that crave blood when drawn and bring madness and death to those foolish enough to draw them. Due to the chaos generated by this, the Demon Blades' powers begin summoning demons from Hell (Yomi), along with causing ancient gods to stir from long slumber.

The two lead characters are Momohime (百姫), a princess of the Narukami clan from the province of Mino; and Kisuke (鬼助), a runaway ninja with no memories but a burning desire for vengeance. For the course of the game, Momohime is inadvertently possessed by the spirit of Jinkuro Izuna (飯綱 陣九朗), an unscrupulous rōnin who was trying to possess the body of Momohime's betrothed Yukinojo Yagyu (柳生 雪之丞), a high-status samurai. Momohime and Kisuke are each accompanied and watched over by a kitsune in human form. They are Kongiku (紺菊), who holds affection for Jinkuro, and Yuzuruha (弓弦葉), who aids Kisuke in his quest against the Demon Blades' corruption. A key character in Kisuke's storyline is Torahime (虎姫), Momohime's sister.

=== Plot ===
Momohime's Story

Momohime wakes up in Kyo with memories of being killed by the dying Jinkuro when he attacked Yukinojo. Jinkuro spirit, forcefully possesses her, but before the process of soul transference is finished, they are attacked. Momohime's soul is kidnapped by the vengeful monk Rankai, forcing Jinkuro to follow Kongiku as Momohime's body will die if her soul is harmed. With her soul safe, Jinkuro sets out to regain the Dark Resurrection Demon Blade so he can properly utilize his Soul Transference Technique and gain influence through a new host. Encountering Yukinojo, who is searching for Momohime, the two battle. Momohime forces Jinkuro to spare Yukinojo, even when she learns that Yukinojo's intentions in marrying her were part of a scheme to ruin her family as punishment for defying the shōgun. Jinkuro goes to Yukinojo's compound to retrieve the Dark Resurrection, but the storehouse where it is said to be is absorbed into Hell by demons. Descending into Hell, Jinkuro's soul is briefly captured by a demon, and it is only with Momohime's help that he escapes and learns that the Dark Resurrection was never in the storehouse. With Momohime's body beginning to fail due to the strain Soul Transference put on it, Jinkuro attempts to ascent to Heaven so he can become an immortal demon, but is stopped by Raijin and Fujin.

While willing to accept his death and allow Momohime her remaining time in her body, Kongiku shows them another way to Heaven on Mount Kongō, where Rankai's temple is located. There, Yukinojo reveals that he had the Dark Resurrection all along. They are then attacked by Fudo-Myoou, who is there to deliver divine justice upon Jinkuro. In the first ending, Jinkuro allows himself to be sent to Hell while Momohime lives; she forgoes her marriage to Yukinojo and becomes a Buddhist nun to save Jinkuro's soul. In the second ending, Momohime and Jinkuro are intercepted by Kisuke and Yuzuruha, who turns Kongiku back into a normal fox as punishment for her actions. Though defeated, the dying Kisuke delivers a fatal wound to Momohime, forcing Jinkuro to merge his soul with Momohime's to save her: this act leaves her an amnesiac but grants her Jinkuro's sword fighting abilities, which become legendary as she travels Japan with Kongiku. In the third ending, after the battle with Fudo-Myoou, Jinkuro is transported to the night he attacked Yukinojo by the Oboro Muramasa Demon Blade, which can defy the passage of fate. He chooses not to attack then, later successfully possessing Yukinojo and safeguarding Momohime's family. Momohime lives to be one hundred years old and bears three children, while Kongiku remains close to Jinkuro in the guise of a servant.

Kisuke's Story

Kisuke, suffering from amnesia and on the run from his ninja clan, travels to Edo in the company of Yuzuruha, accidentally breaking a seal imprisoning damned souls in the process. Defeating the souls after they manifest as Ōmukade, he learns from the ninja's employer Yukinojo that he was part of a mission to steal the Kuzuryu Demon Blade from Momohime's Nakurami Clan as punishment for defying the shōgun's order to surrender it, tying into Yukinojo's intentions in marrying Momohime. Yukinojo sends Kisuke against Torahime, Momohime's sister and the shrine maiden who kept the Kuzuryu's power in check. Pursuing her, Kisuke fights both Torahime and undead soldiers loyal to her family, and agents who are preserving the flow of magic energy to Mount Fuji. His battles awaken his memories: he was originally disguised as a servant in Torahime's household as part of Yukinojo's scheme, but fell in love with Torahime and attempted to betray his clan when stealing the Kuzuryu. Dying from his wounds, the spirit of Senju Oboroya, the creator of the Oboro Style that controls the Demon Blades, fused with Kisuke to save his life and pass on the Oboro Style to someone who would use it for good. The fusion triggered Kisuke's amnesia, but left him with the ability to wield Demon Blades without succumbing to their evil.

Rescuing Torahime from the spider demon Tsuchigumo, Kisuke learns that she died while fleeing from Tsunayoshi's forces, and that her present life is a temporary gift from Amitābha. The two travel to Mount Fuji, where its native dragon god has gone berserk with rage after the energy of Japan's dragon veins are diverted to Edo, forcing a route into Heaven. The true culprit is Inugami, a mad god imprisoned in the Kuzuryu. In the first ending, the possessed Tsunayoshi is defeated by Kisuke after fatally wounding Torahime, who dies in Kisuke's arms. After the battle, Kisuke asks Amitābha to return the now-enlightened Torahime to life, then commits suicide as an act of defiance when his demand is refused. At Torahime's request, she and Kisuke are reincarnated, with Yuzuruha trying to help them reunite. In the second ending, Tsunayoshi is killed by the Jinkuro-possessed Momohime, but Kisuke exorcises Jinkuro, and following Torahime's final request becomes Momohime's servant. The two set out on a personal quest to locate all the Demon Blades causing conflict in Japan. In the third ending, after defeating Inugami, Kisuke is sent back to the day he betrayed his employers by the Oboro Muramasa. His warning allows Torahime to foil the plot against her family, then Kisuke steals the Kuzuryu and sets off on a journey around the world to exhaust its power by striking down evil, promising to marry Torahime upon his return.

Genroku Legends

The main protagonists of Genroku Legends: from left to right, Okoi and Miike, Gonbe and Otae, Arashimaru and Shirohebi, and Rajyaki and Seikichi.

The Genroku Legends are split into four different stories directly inspired by Japanese folklore and set in the Muramasa universe. In "Fishy Tales of the Nekomata", a domestic cat called Miike sees her family brought to ruin and all its members killed. Becoming a nekomata and taking on the form of the family daughter Okoi, she vows revenge against her family's killers: assassins employed by their rival Netsuzo Wakamiya and his samurai retainer Shinzaemon Shigematsu. Using teachings from the tanuki Danzaburou, Miike infiltrates the Wakamiya estate as Okoi to kill Wakamiya and Shigematsu. Despite succeeding, her rage extends to the entire household. In the end, her tails are cut off by Jinkuro when he is hired to exorcise her: in the process she curses Jinkuro with illness, setting the events of Momohime's story in motion. Now at peace, Miike spends time with an old priest and hosts moonlight dances with local cats and bakeneko. In the alternate ending, Miike becomes a demon whose rage is finally quelled by the old priest.

In "A Cause to Daikon For", the farmer Gonbe is forced to form a revolt when the local daimyō raises taxes to the point that local villages are on the brink of ruin. Abandoned by the authorities and aided by the spirit of his deceased wife Otae, Gonbe and his neighbours fight through the daimyō's minions before killing him. Executed for his actions, he relates his story to Enma, who acknowledges his reasoning but condemns him to Hell. Due to her love for him, Otae joins Gonbe despite being a pure soul. After complaining to Enma about the exhausted demons being unable to punish their souls, Enma banishes Gonbe, Otae and his comrades back to the living world, where they live in peace under a kinder daimyō. In the alternate ending, the entire sequence is an illusion produced by Gonbe's spirit around the ruins of the daimyō's castle, ended when a passing Yamabushi frees their spirits.

In "A Spirited Seven Nights' Haunting", the Iga ninja Arashimaru goes on the run after learning his latest target, the Okabe clan leader and caretaker of the Spear of Bishamon, was his father. Taking shelter in a shrine, Arashimaru accidentally breaks a mirror sacred to the Goddess Inaraki, who becomes a Shirohebi (white snake) that curses him to die in seven days. After besting his master Shiranui in combat, Arashimaru learns that his mission was orchestrated by the monk So Xian, a century old Chinese spy working to destabilize Japan's ruling classes who was indirectly responsible for taking the young Kisuke from his family. Arashimaru kills So Xian and escapes with Shiranui's aid, then goes peacefully to his death after asking the saddened Shirohebi to give his head and Spear of Bishamon to his brother Dengoro to restore the Okabe house. Arashimaru's head is given proper burial at the Shirohebi's insistence, and Arashimaru's spirit is deified due to the grave becoming a prayer site for pilgrims. In the alternate ending, Arashimaru is possessed by So Xian and enslaves Shirohebi, becoming the sorcerer "Orochimaru"; the Okabe's last surviving heir escapes, taking on the name "Jiraiya" to fight Orochimaru.

In "Hell's Where the Heart Is", the Oni girl Rajyaki, daughter of Enma, is journeying to recover the treasures of the Seven Gods of Fortune. On her journey, the womanizing ex-monk Seikichi accidentally proposes to her and she accepts him as her husband. In the end, Seikichi saves her from a Jorōgumo's poison by feeding her the sacred peach of Fukurokuju, though this prompts Enma to banish her from Hell. The Seven Gods of Fortune persuade Rajyaki to return to her father, while Seikichi moves to live a proper life, with Rajyaki returning as a human to formalize their marriage. In the alternate ending, Seikichi saves the still-banished Rajyaki from hunters by pretending he killed her, establishing himself as a samurai; Rajyaki becomes his wife, and they have five children who bear their mother's demonic horns. The Genroku Legends conclude with the narrator detailing the locations of the Seven Gods' treasures scattered through the stories, and thanking the player for locating them and calming Enma so his demons could return to Hell.

== Development ==
Muramasa was developed by Vanillaware, a studio created by former Atlus staff members to create successor projects to the 2D action-adventure game Princess Crown. According to sound producer Hitoshi Sakimoto, the game's director George Kamitani was laying out plans for Muramasa when Odin Sphere was in the middle of development. According to Kamitani, while Odin Sphere was an evolution of Princess Crown's narrative, Muramasa provided the chance of evolving its gameplay. He even went so far as to dub it "Princess Crown III". The draft proposal was completed by the end of 2006. The positive sales of Odin Sphere gave Vanillaware the capital needed to begin full development on Muramasa. The game was also co-funded by their publishing deal with Marvelous Entertainment, who were sold the project after Odin Sphere's publisher Atlus refused to take any further products from Vanillaware until Odin Sphere had released, in addition to delaying the game so it would not compete with their main 2007 release Persona 3. In addition to Atlus, they also pitched to Capcom, but Vanillaware's untested reputation prompted them to be turned down. Kamitani stated in a later interview that Vanillaware would have closed had Marvelous not accepted the project. The team's style of development was identical to their strategy for Odin Sphere, although they worked to change up some aspects to make it a unique experience. When developing the game, the team decided to create a vertical plane for players to explore, something which the team had needed to forego with Odin Sphere. In addition, bathing sequences cut from Odin Sphere were reworked and incorporated into Muramasa as hot spring scenes.

Muramasa was worked on by sixteen people, over half of Vanillaware's staff, including Kamitani as the game's writer. The Wii was chosen as the game's platform of release as its specs were fairly close to that of the PlayStation 2, the console for which Odin Sphere was developed. This meant that the team could carry over their earlier experience rather than start from scratch learning about new hardware. Kamitani did create design proposals for versions on the PlayStation 3 and Xbox 360, but went undeveloped due to budget limitations. Using the Wii's motion controls was tested by the team, but due to the game's old-fashioned style there was little need to implement them. Part of the reason for this decision was that the precision needed to control characters was best achieved using a traditional control set-up. The biggest problem when developing for the Wii was the graphics, especially how to get the various pieces of artwork in the game's scenery to interact and respond properly. They also wanted to keep loading times down to a minimum, which was made possible due to the Wii's area pre-loading abilities. Technical tinkering of this kind went on until the end of development. The game's programmer was Kentaro Ohnishi, whose biggest challenge was creating a battle system which allowed for cancelling of attacks, while maintaining the appearance of smooth attack animation. The resultant code looked so strange that another programmer thought it was a fault and deleted it, forcing Ohnishi to rebuild it. The team was highly dedicated to the success of the project, putting a large amount of work to make it as good as it could be for players. By the time of release, funds for the company had been drained. Production overall was stressful, with an external company handling debugging due to the team being exhausted.

Kamitani wrote the story of Muramasa based on his wish to create a "ninja Princess Crown". As Odin Sphere had drawn inspiration from Shakespearean theater, Muramasa instead used kabuki as its influence, prompting Kamitani to buy kabuki scripts as part of his research. Due to this and the script's many references to classic Japanese literature, Kamitani had trouble handling the old-fashioned writing style. As he was nervous about using Japanese mythology so extensively, he also incorporated Buddhist theology into the narrative. In creating the game's atmosphere, which was based on Japan as it was in the Edo era combined with local folklore and mythology, the team wanted to create an air of realism within its fantasy world.

The game's setting was a heavy departure from Vanillaware's previous games, which had used Western-inspired settings and stories. The overall atmosphere was meant to emulate those of The Legend of Kage and Genpei Tōma Den. The game's central theme was "death". Kamitani's early concept was based on the long-running television drama Mito Kōmon, but his wish for something "stranger" let to the kabuki influences. The early story draft was based on Kanadehon Chūshingura, a kabuki play based on the history of the forty-seven rōnin. Only a small amount of the initial draft survived, with Torahime being a hangover character. Much of Momohime's story was based on the play Sakurahime Azuma Bunsho. Kamitani was writing the game's dialogue right into February, when voice recording took place. Several potential playable characters and storylines, such as narratives following Jinkuro and Torahime, had to be cut from the game. Elements of the cut storylines were incorporated into Kisuke and Momohime's stories. The number of protagonists in the story was dictated by the game's budget, as Kamitani's initial idea was for more characters similar to the narrative of Princess Crown.

In keeping with the wish for realism, Momohime and Kisuke were given distinct accents (Momohime used a cultured dialect while Kisuke spoke with an Edogawa accent). Another realistic element was the game's food, which was designed based on the types of delicacies that were popular in the 17th and 18th centuries. One of the folklore references was the 108 Demon Blades in the game, which was a direct reference to the 108 human vices in Japanese folklore. A number of monsters and deities from Japanese mythology made appearances in the game, and the art style was intended to give a "Japanese" feel without consciously copying artwork from the game's period. Character designs were handled by Yasuhiro Fujiwara, Yasuo Shirai, Takehiro Shiga, Kouichi Maenou and Ine Kawazu. Kamitani's art style choice was influenced by the bright ink-wash style of Japanese woodblock prints. He also drew inspiration from the folklore-centered anime series Manga Nippon Mukashibanashi. The artwork was created at double its in-game resolution, then reduced to fit within the hardware.

=== Music ===
The music was handled by a team from sound company Basiscape, composed of multiple composers who had worked on Odin Sphere. Sakimoto acted as sound producer, the sound director was Masaaki Kaneko, and the music was composed by Sakimoto, Yoshimi Kudo, Noriyuki Kamikura, Mitsuhiro Kaneda, Kimihiro Abe, Azusa Chiba and Masaharu Iwata. Sakimoto was working on music for Odin Sphere when the project was first proposed, and thought Kamitani was being overambitious working on a premise-based in Japan when developing a game based on European mythology. During the initial planning stage, Sakimoto thought the game would be a "mock-Japanese" project, with Japanese instruments inserted into techno music. Once he realized how sincere Kamitani was with the project, Sakimoto and the team needed to re-identify with the roots of traditional Japanese music. For Sakimoto, his approach was to reconnect with how earlier Japanese people turned their wabi-sabi philosophy and worldview into words and music: he carried over this approach into the project. Each of the composers had to go through similar experiences.

== Release ==
Muramasa was announced at the 2007 Tokyo Game Show (TGS) under the title Oboro Muramasa Yōtōden (朧村正妖刀伝; "The Hazy Legend of Muramasa's Mystical Sword"), alongside its intended platform, setting and gameplay mechanics. After its announcement, information releases about the game virtually stopped, and an April 2008 report by Famitsu reported the game's development was "struggling", although no details were revealed. Muramasa was reintroduced at TGS 2008 under its Japanese title, along with its planned release window in 2009 and details on its characters and story. The game was released in Japan on April 9, 2009, published by Marvelous Entertainment. It was released as part of Nintendo Channel's budget game line-up in January 2010, and re-released for download on Wii U via Nintendo eShop in July 2015.

A North American version under the title Muramasa: The Demon Blade was later published. The game was originally being published by Xseed Games, but in April 2009 they dropped the title from their schedule. Publishing rights were transferred to Ignition Entertainment. Ignition later explained that it was in competition with Xseed and Atlus to acquire the American publishing rights, and after seeing Muramasa at TGS 2008 they were encouraged to apply for the rights. The change between publishers was an internal agreement between Xseed, their parent company Marvelous USA, and Ignition. The situation was amicably resolved as Xseed already had a large number of Wii titles lined up, and giving Muramasa to another publisher allowed multiple titles not to be overlooked when it came to Western publicity. The game was released in North America on September 8, 2009. The game's localization was done by external localization companies in close collaboration with Ignition Entertainment. Due to the game's strong Japanese atmosphere, it was seen as a hard sell in the West, but during localization a lot of work went into preserving it rather than adjusting it for Western tastes. Due to this, the game was not dubbed into English, but instead retained its Japanese voice track while text was localized. An aspect Ignition worked hard with was to make sure the localization was of good quality by working closely with their chosen localization partners. This was due to backlash received by fans and critics over the "lackluster" localization of Lux-Pain, which had been beyond their control during development.

The game was published in Europe by Rising Star Games alongside other Marvelous products including Valhalla Knights: Eldar Saga and Arc Rise Fantasia. The English translation was carried over from the North American version, although the English language version underwent regional adjustment, and some minor faults were corrected. The game was also translated into French, Italian, German and Spanish, which made using the original translation more practical than creating a new one. Originally scheduled for November 2009, it was first shifted into 2010, then moved back into 2009. The game was released in Europe on November 6 of that year. Upon release in the United Kingdom, most retailers did not stock it: this was put down to a general attitude that it would not sell like prevalent franchises or games from mainstream genres. The game was released in Australia on December 3 the same year.

=== Muramasa Rebirth ===
Muramasa Rebirth, released in Japan under its original title of Oboro Muramasa, is a port of Muramasa developed by Vanillaware for the PlayStation Vita. According to its development team, the Vita was chosen as the port's platform over the more commercially successful Xbox 360 and PlayStation 3 due to the Vita's OLED-based screen, which they felt better portray the game's palette. While content was cut during the original version's development, the team decided against going back and restoring it, instead creating new additional content. The controls were also adjusted to suit the new platform. Muramasa Rebirth was published in Japan by Marvelous AQL on March 28, 2013. The game's Western release was handled by Aksys Games, which also created a new localization. Compared to the original version, which was described as a direct translation, Aksys Games' version was more "flavorful" and more faithful to the original text. It was released in North America on June 25, followed by Europe and Australia through PlayStation Network on October 16.

In addition to the main game, four self-contained stories were released as downloadable content (DLC) under the title Genroku Legends, (Note: Japanese: 元禄怪奇譚, Hepburn: Genroku Kaikitan) featuring new characters within the Muramasa universe. For the new characters, swords are replaced by other weapons such as clubs and shurikens, but they otherwise play in the same way as Momohime and Kisuke. New music was created for the title under Sakimoto's supervision: the four episodes were scored by Kudo, Chiba, Kaneda and Iwata respectively. The Vanillaware-developed DLC launched in both Japan and the West between November 2013 and November 2014: the final DLC's Japanese release was delayed by over two months behind the Western release. A special edition of Muramasa Rebirth exclusive to Japan contained all four DLC episodes alongside the original content and was released on March 19, 2015.

=== Muramasa: Revenant Blades ===
Another release, Muramasa: Revenant Blades, (Note: Japanese: 朧村正怪奇譚, Hepburn: Oboro Muramasa Kaikitan; "Hazy Muramasa Legends") was announced in June 2026. It is scheduled for release on February 4, 2027 for PlayStation 5, Nintendo Switch, Nintendo Switch 2 and Windows; Muramasa: Revenant Blades is the first Vanillaware title to be released for Windows. The game includes all the content from Muramasa Rebirth, updated high-definition graphics, added gameplay options, and a new localization with English voice acting included. Revenant Blades was developed by Vanillaware, with Vanillaware's Wataru Nakanishi as director, and Makoto Shioda of Marvelous as producer. Sakimoto returned as sound producer. The game is set to be published by branches of Marvelous worldwide.

== Reception ==
Reception

Aggregate score
Aggregator	Score	
Aggregator	PS Vita	Wii
Metacritic	78/100	81/100

Review scores
Publication	Score	
Publication	PS Vita	Wii
Destructoid	7.5/10	7/10
Electronic Gaming Monthly	8/10	N/A
Eurogamer	N/A	7/10
Famitsu	32/40	34/40
Game Informer	7/10	7.75/10
GamePro	N/A	4.5/5
GameRevolution	N/A	B+
GameSpot	N/A	7.5/10
GameTrailers	N/A	8.3/10
IGN	8/10	8.9/10
RPGamer	4/5	4/5
RPGFan	85%	86%

The Demon Blade received generally positive reviews, garnering a score of 81/100 on Metacritic based on 58 critic reviews. In its review, Famitsu praised the art style, and called the battle system "absorbing". Their main complaints were the lack of variety between characters and the story having no proper climax. Destructoid's Conrad Zimmerman called it "a very solid title", saying that while flawed in its story delivery and instances of repetition, its visuals were "absolutely beautiful" and it proved fun to play. IGN's Mark Bozon was highly positive about the graphics and sound, but thought the backtracking might put some people off and said the story "may go over people’s heads". Game Revolution writer Nick Tan enjoyed the game greatly, but admitted that its lack of depth reduced the score he could give it as a reviewer. Joe Juba, writing for Game Informer, found The Demon Blade "stunning" despite some missteps in its pacing and depth. GameSpot's Tom McShea praised the visuals, boss battles and collectable swords, but found few other activities outside combat, which itself lacked depth. GamePro's Andy Burt called the visuals "gorgeous" and praised the combat and multiple storylines, but found its linearity and occasions where combat got "bogged down" hampered the experience. GameTrailers praised its combat and visuals, calling it "one of the better action titles on the [Wii]". Keza MacDonald, writing for Eurogamer, noted that "like many beautiful things, Muramasa: The Demon Blade is a little lacking in substance", saying that its lack of depth undermined other aspects. Michael Cunningham of RPGamer called it "a great game" to see and play despite its plain story. RPGFan's Dennis Rubinshteyn shared several points in common with reviewers about the story and repetition, while again praising the graphics and sound design.

Rebirth also had a positive reception, with Metacritic giving it a score of 78/100 based on 26 critic reviews. In its review, Famitsu praised it for being a good remake, although one reviewer was disappointed at the lack of new content. Chris Carter of Destructoid said that people who had already played the original version would not find much new content, while newcomers would likely be enchanted by it. Juba, reviewing Rebirth for Game Informer, said that the game was "exactly what developer Vanillaware intended it to be: a better-looking version of the 2009 release", while noting that this had not fixed the game's original faults as noted by him. IGN's Colin Moriarty called Rebirth a "faithful port", praising the improved localization and generally enjoying playing despite backtracking hampering the experience. Adrian den Ouden of RPGamer also praised the localization and shared points of praise and criticism with the previous reviewer. Stephen Meyerink of RPGFan, who had not played the Wii original, called Rebirth "a gorgeous, action-packed, fairly lengthy adventure that looks, sounds, and plays better than ever". Chris Holzworth of Electronic Gaming Monthly was impressed by the visuals and indifferent about the story, and recommended playing it on a higher difficulty setting.

=== Sales ===
On its debut in Japan, The Demon Blade reached #2 in game sales charts, coming in behind Sengoku Basara: Battle Heroes with 29,000 units sold. Sales of the title were higher than anticipated, resulting in several stores in Japan being sold out within two weeks of its release. The game had sold 47,000 units by November 2009. In North America, NPD Group reported that the game had sold 35,000 units during its first month of release. In a feature on notable video games in 2009, GamesTM stated that The Demon Blade sold "extremely well", besting established Western franchise releases such as Dead Space: Extraction. Ignition Entertainment, the game's North American publisher, confirmed that the September sales for The Demon Blade had fallen within the NPD Group's estimates, and had met their sales expectations. In a 2010 interview, publisher Marvelous Entertainment stated that, despite positive reception from both critics and players, Muramasa: The Demon Blade had suffered from low sales in Japan, North America and Europe. This was put down to it being a non-traditional game and the falling relevance of the Wii hardware.

In its first week of release, Rebirth debuted at #5, selling 45,660 physical units. Within the first month following its release in Japan, the game topped 100,000 shipments, with at least 67,800 physical retail sales, and the remainder as digital copies distributed on the PlayStation Network. Muramasa Rebirth ranked as the seventh most downloaded digital Vita game on the Japanese PlayStation Network in 2013. In both North America and Europe, the game ranked high on PSN download charts: it ranked as the fifth best-selling Vita title in North America, while in Europe it debuted at #5 before climbing to #4 by December 2013.
