= Dungeons & Dragons: Tower of Doom =

1994 arcade game

- European arcade flyer
- Developer: Capcom
- Publisher: Capcom
- Designers: Tomoshi Sadamoto; Magigi Fukunishi; George Kamitani
- Artist: Kinu Nishimura
- Writer: Alex Jimenez
- Composers: Isao Abe; Takayuki Iwai; Hideki Okugawa
- Series: Mystara
- Platforms: Arcade, Sega Saturn
- Release: Arcade: JP: January 1994; NA/EU: 1994; Saturn: JP: March 4, 1999
- Genres: Beat 'em up, role-playing
- Modes: Single-player, multiplayer
- Arcade system: CP System II

Dungeons & Dragons: Tower of Doom, (Note: Japanese: ダンジョンズ&ドラゴンズ タワーオブドゥーム, Hepburn: Danjonzu & Doragonzu Tawā obu Dūmu) published in 1994, is the first of two arcade games created by Capcom based on the Dungeons & Dragons tabletop role-playing game and set in the Mystara campaign setting. It is a side scrolling beat 'em up with role-playing video game elements for one to four players. The game was also released on the Sega Saturn, packaged with its sequel, Dungeons & Dragons: Shadow over Mystara, under the title Dungeons & Dragons Collection, although the Saturn version limited the gameplay to only two players. In 2013, both games were re-released for PlayStation 3, Windows, Xbox 360 and Wii U as Dungeons & Dragons: Chronicles of Mystara.

== Gameplay ==
Tower of Doom is a side-scrolling arcade game with four playable characters (cleric, dwarf, elf, fighter) and classic Dungeons & Dragons monsters as enemies. Bosses include a troll that regenerates unless burned, a large black dragon, the dreaded Shadow Elf (Mystara's equivalent of the drow), a beholder, the optional superboss Flamewing (a great wyrm red dragon) and the final boss Deimos (an archlich).

The Fighter (center) in combat with skeletons.

At various points in the game, the players are presented with a choice of paths to take to continue progress. Each path goes to a different area, and it is impossible to visit every area during a single playthrough.

Gameplay is more technical than the average beat 'em up game. In addition to the usual basic attacks and jumping, it includes blocking, strong attacks, turning attacks, dashing attacks, crouching and evading. It also requires the use of careful tactics, as most enemies have the same abilities as the heroes and a longer range.

Daggers, hammers, arrows and burning oils can be used as throwing weapons, and many enemies have similar weapons. Spells can be used via magical rings or by the two spellcasters (a cleric and an elf).

== Characters ==
- The Fighter is a balanced character with great range and power, and has the most health.
- The Elf has a short range with her sword and packs noticeably less power than the fighter, but has seven arcane spells at her disposal: Magic Missile, Invisibility, Fireball, Lightning Bolt, Polymorph Others, Ice Storm, and Cloudkill.
- The Cleric has fighting skills comparable to those of the elf. He can turn undead and use five divine spells: Hold Person, Striking, Continual Light, Sticks to Snakes, and Cure Serious Wounds. He is the most adept at using a shield, being able to block vertical attacks that the other characters cannot.
- The Dwarf has short horizontal range (but the best vertical reach), and is the most powerful character in close combat due to his quick combo speed.

== Plot ==
The Republic of Darokin in Mystara is under a terrible siege as the number of monsters and their attacks rise. A group of four adventurers step forth to rescue various areas, then are sent by the merchant lord Corwyn Linton to investigate the attacks, revealed to be masterminded by the Arch Lich Deimos. The adventurers eventually make their way to Deimos' Tower of Doom and ultimately destroy him.

== Development ==
At the beginning of the 1990s, Capcom acquired the license to create D&D games. As part of the deal, they ported Eye of the Beholder to the Super Nintendo Entertainment System. The Japanese branch of Capcom were having difficulty getting TSR's approval for creating a D&D game, so they turned to Capcom USA to negotiate. Capcom and license-holder TSR met in January 1992 to discuss how the game should be approached. They decided to write the story first, and build the game around the story. Most of the staff at Capcom USA were not familiar with D&D rules and lore, so assistant James Goddard turned to D&D enthusiast Alex Jimenez to come up with a concept and make it understandable to a Japanese audience, all the while testing the product. Some of Jimenez's inspirations for the beat em up' style came from Golden Axe, while the multiple paths were based on Thayer's Quest. There was debate between Capcom and SSI on whether to make the game Asian-themed or Western-themed, which Jimenez himself managed to resolve. Jimenez supplied concept art for the characters. One of his biggest difficulties was trying to help the Japanese developers grasp the D&D elements. The game was originally supposed to have two buttons in the arcade controls, but two more were needed to accommodate the inventory system.

Once the initial game design was complete, Jimenez translated it into an actual Dungeons & Dragons scenario and told his gamers group in San Jose to play it, with himself as gamemaster. Capcom of Japan then revised the scenario design based on the players' reactions.

== Home releases ==
=== Dungeons & Dragons Collection ===
Dungeons & Dragons Collection is a two-disc compilation of Tower of Doom and Shadow over Mystara. It was released only in Japan on March 4, 1999, exclusively for the Sega Saturn. The ports have minor differences in gameplay, and there is a maximum of two players instead of the original four. The compilation uses the Saturn's 4MB RAM expansion cartridge. Capcom originally planned to release Tower of Doom as a standalone title for the Sega Saturn and Sony PlayStation, but cancelled the plan early on. It was initially announced that the collection would be released for both the Saturn and PlayStation, with the PlayStation version due for a U.S. release, but the PlayStation version was shelved in early 1998 so that Capcom could focus on other projects.

In 1999, GameSpot's James Mielke criticized the loading times as "horrendous", with mid-level battles occasionally pausing to let data stream in, and "as a very basic scrolling hacker", he called it simply "OK" and average. In 2005, IGN picked the Dungeons & Dragons Collection as one of the top ten co-op games. Retro Gamer included it on their list of ten essential Saturn imports, praising its "stunning animation thanks to using the 4MB ram pack" and opining that while it suffers from lengthy loading times, they called it the best scrolling fighter game on the system, and felt to be superior to Taito's PuLiRuLa and Capcom's own Dynasty Warriors (the Retro Gamer team were confusing Dynasty Warriors with Dynasty Wars). In 2023, Time Extension included the collection on their top 25 "Best Beat 'Em Ups of All Time" list.

=== Dungeons & Dragons: Chronicles of Mystara ===
Tower of Doom and Shadow over Mystara were released as part of the Dungeons and Dragons: Chronicles of Mystara compilation for the Wii U, PlayStation 3, Xbox 360, and Microsoft Windows in the summer of 2013.

== Reception ==
In Japan, Game Machine listed Dungeons & Dragons: Tower of Doom on their March 1, 1994 issue as being the second most-successful table arcade unit of the month, outperforming titles like Raiden II and Fatal Fury Special. In North America, RePlay reported Tower of Doom as the most-popular arcade game at the time. Play Meter also listed Tower of Doom as the fourteenth most-popular arcade game at the time. The game received a rave review from GamePro, who commented that its action is not as fast as it could be, but rather furious, smoothly controlled, and intuitive. They also praised the game's length, complexity, and non-linear nature, and its faithful recreation of Dungeons & Dragons elements.

According to GameSpy's Allen Rausch, Dungeons & Dragons: Tower of Doom was "equally good, though not as well remembered" as other "Final Fight-style beat-'em-ups at the arcade" like Teenage Mutant Ninja Turtles and The Simpsons. Rausch felt combat was fun and had more depth, and "came loaded with secrets to find and treasures to swipe" and after the players beat the game's seven levels, they find that the ultimate bad guy was actually just the pawn of an even bigger bad guy.

== See also ==
- List of Capcom games
