= Habanero-tan =

Unofficial mascot of Japanese snack Bōkun Habanero

Habanero-tan (ハバネロたん) is the unofficial mascot of Bōkun Habanero, the habanero pepper-flavored snacks produced by Tohato. Habanero-tan and her companions with names like "Jalapeño-san" are the personification of spices as cute young girls. They were created by several Japanese amateur artists, and of them, Takehiro "Shigatake" Shiga, the creator of the character Habanero-tan, drew a series of yonkoma manga featuring the lives of these girls. Shiga later became the graphics designer for the Vanillaware games Odin Sphere and GrimGrimoire.

Habanero-tan's popularity has led to various renditions (some of them risque) by other Japanese artists, and even appearances on the OVA Netrun-mon. There is also a dōjin game called Habanero-tan House which incorporates many of the things seen in Shigatake's comics. The game's creator, Ashinaga Oji-san, later worked with Shiga and Vanillaware to develop a similar game called Kumatanchi for the Nintendo DS.

== Characters ==
Habanero-tan (ハバネロたん)
An energetic young girl with a red dress and red hair, and a stem on her head. Created by Takehiro Shiga.
Habanero-neesan (ハバネロ姐さん)
Habanero's friend and older sister figure. Created by Fumikane Shimada.
Capsaicin-chan (カプサイシンちゃん, Kapusaishin-chan)

A younger girl that's similar to Jalapeno-san. Created by Bomaan.

Milk-san (牛乳さん, Gyūnyū-san)
Habanero's friend and milk supply. She has large breasts and wears skimpy clothes. Created by Salad Oil.
Jalapeño-san (ハラペーニョさん, Harapēnyo-san)

Habanero's friend who wears skimpy clothing. Created by Bomaan.

Jolokia-Tan (ジョロキアたん, Jorokia-tan)

The mischievous ghost friend of Habanero-tan that can disappear and appear at will. Created by Shiga.

Kuma-tan (くまたんち) A character from the DS game Kumatanchi.
