= Bōkun Habanero =

Brand name of a Japanese snack food

- Japanese snack food
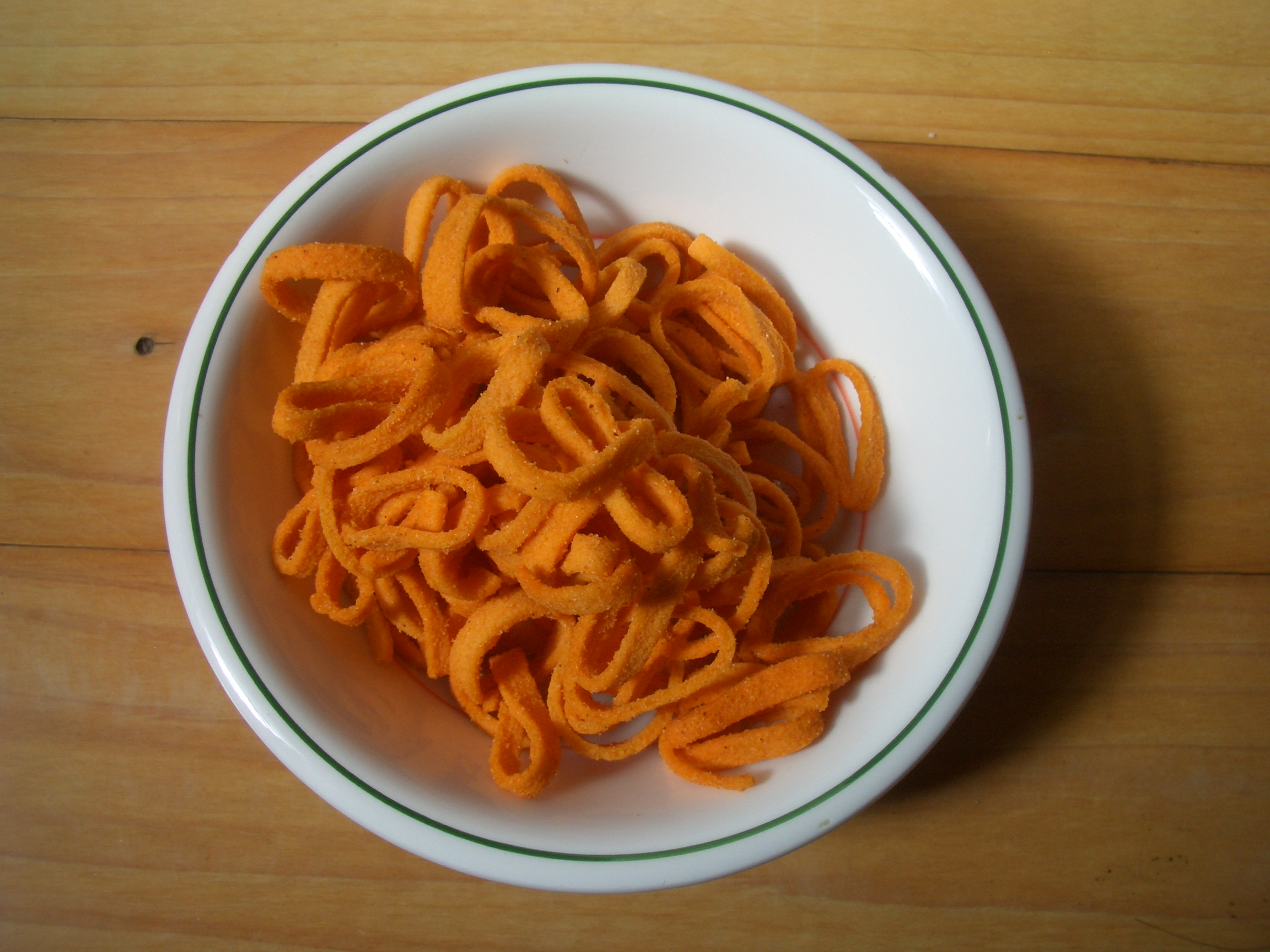
- Japanese name: 暴君ハバネロ
- Maker: Tohato
- Ingredients: potato granules, potato flakes, potato starch, vegetable oil, red pepper powder, salt, sugar, onion powder, glucose, garlic powder, chicken powder, yeast extract, habanero hot pepper sauce.
- Flavours: Bōkun Habanero, chili; Itoshi no Bebîta, pork, chicken and vegetable; Bōkun habapî, mixed original snack and peanuts; Bōkun bebinero, chili and chicken consomme with mayonnaise

Bōkun Habanero is the brand name of a Japanese snack food. The name means "Tyrant Habanero", a reference to the habanero pepper, which is one of the world's hottest chili peppers. Its name derives from a play on words linking "habanero" with "Tyrant Nero".

The snack consists of potato rings, and is moderately spicy by Japanese standards.

The package features the brand mascot, Tyrant Habanero, a chili pepper with an evil or maniacal grin. The bebiita version features his younger sister, and the bebinero version features a younger version of the regular character.

Each 55g packet contains 297.3 calories.

== Cultural references ==
Bōkun Habanero is the focus of a popular Japanese internet meme that started on the popular Japanese internet Bulletin board system Futaba Channel. The meme revolves around an anthropomorphic caricature based on Bōkun Habanero and its mascot. The caricature, Habanero-tan, is a young, naive girl in a red dress who resembles the personification of an habanero pepper.
