= GrimGrimoire =

2007 video game

- North American PS2 cover art
- Developer: Vanillaware (Note: Additional production and supervision by Nippon Ichi Software.)
- Publishers: JP: Nippon Ichi Software; NA: NIS America; PAL: Koei
- Directors: George Kamitani; Yoshio Nishimura (OnceMore)
- Producer: Sohei Niikawa
- Designers: George Kamitani; Kazuya Nakagawa
- Programmers: Takashi Nishii; Kentaro Ohnishi; Kenji Fujimori; Teruhisa Kanayama (OnceMore)
- Artists: Kouichi Maenou; George Kamitani
- Writer: George Kamitani
- Composers: Hitoshi Sakimoto; Masaharu Iwata; Kimihiro Abe; Mitsuhiro Kaneda; Noriyuki Kamikura
- Platforms: PlayStation 2; Nintendo Switch; PlayStation 4; PlayStation 5
- Release: April 12, 2007: PlayStation 2; JP: April 12, 2007; NA: June 26, 2007; PAL: September 28, 2007 PlayStation 4, Nintendo Switch; JP: July 28, 2022; NA: April 4, 2023; EU: April 7, 2023; AU: April 14, 2023 PlayStation 5; NA: April 4, 2023; EU: April 7, 2023; AU: April 14, 2023
- Genre: Real-time strategy
- Mode: Single-player

GrimGrimoire (Note: Gurimu Gurimoa (Japanese: グリムグリモア)) is a 2007 real-time strategy video game developed by Vanillaware and published by Nippon Ichi Software (Japan, North America) and Koei (Europe) for the PlayStation 2. A remaster, GrimGrimoire OnceMore was released in Japan on PlayStation 4 and Nintendo Switch in 2022 and worldwide, along with a PlayStation 5 version, in 2023. The story follows Lillet Blan, a trainee witch who is sent into a repeating cycle of five days after her school is attacked by an evil wizard seeking the hidden Philosopher's Stone. The player commands units called familiars, each having strengths and weaknesses against the other, with the goal of either destroying the opponent's bases or surviving waves of enemies.

GrimGrimoire was born from Vanillaware staff wanting to create their version of StarCraft, beginning development after completion of their first title Odin Sphere. Due to various factors, GrimGrimoire was released before Odin Sphere, becoming the company's Japanese debut while also draining its funds. Writer and director George Kamitani based the setting on Atelier Marie: The Alchemist of Salburg and the Harry Potter series. The music was composed by a team from Basiscape led by company founder Hitoshi Sakimoto. The remaster included expanded gameplay, enhanced graphics, and a new voice cast.

Upon release, the game met a generally positive reception; praise went to its narrative and implementation of RTS gameplay on a console, but many faulted the audio and controls. Despite Kamitani planning sequels, GrimGrimoire was a commercial failure and Nippon Ichi Software did not continue the series. The character Lujie Piche crossed over into Nippon Ichi Software's Soul Nomad & the World Eaters as part of the two companies' collaboration. Vanillaware would later reimagine their early gameplay and presentation ideas for GrimGrimoire in 2019's 13 Sentinels: Aegis Rim.

== Gameplay ==
A battle in GrimGrimoire, showing types of Glamour familiars.

GrimGrimoire is a two-dimensional (2D) side-scrolling real-time strategy (RTS) video game; players take the role of trainee witch Lillet Blan, who completes both story missions and optional challenge levels. Each main level is bookended by story cutscenes, with the scenario taking place over a repeating five-day period. During the RTS segments, the player takes the role of Lillet Blan, who directs the action while the multi-floored battle area is shown from a side-scrolling perspective. All actions take place in real time, though gameplay can be paused for the player to issue commands. The environment and enemy movements beyond where the player has explored are obscured by a fog of war. There are three difficulty settings: "Sweet", "Easy" and "Normal".

The player fights using units called Familiars. The units are split into four different styles representing the in-game magical schools. The schools are Glamour, Alchemy, Necromancy and Sorcery, which are unlocked at different points during the story. Each school has a rock-paper-scissors arrangement of strengths and weaknesses among the schools, summoning different associated familiars. The units have different movement abilities, tied to both their group and their movement style.

Units in battle areas are split between the player, allied allied characters or the level's enemy force. There are six commands available: Move, Attack, Defend, Heal, Patrol and Gather. Units are summoned from runes conjured by magical books called Grimoires. Runes can established on each floor of the level, with each three of the twelve available runes aligned to a different form of magic. Establishing runes and summoning Familiars require Mana, magical energy gathered from crystals on some floors using units from the Glamour class. Grimoires can be levelled up, granting access to new and more powerful units. Levels have different win conditions, though many are won by destroying all enemy runes.

== Synopsis ==
=== Setting and characters ===
The action of GrimGrimoire takes place entirely within the Tower of Silver Star, a magic school with ancient roots, over a repeating cycle of five days. In the game's backstory, the Archmage Calvaros cooperated with fellow wizards Gammel Dore and Lujie Piche to create the Philosopher's Stone, a powerful magical object. Calvaros attempted to use its power for himself, and was killed by Gammel and Lujie; Lujie in turn attempted to use it, and after being killed becomes a hostile ghost within the Tower.

The main protagonist is Lillet Blan, a talented witch-in-training from a rural area. She is taught by Gammel; the demon Advocat; the half-lion alchemist Chartruese; and the necromancer Opalnaria. Lillet's fellow students are the casual and flirtatious Bartido; the upright Hiram; and Margarita, who hails from an area that hunts witches. She also grows close to Amoretta, a homunculus created by Chartruese from an angel's soul.

=== Plot ===
Lillet Blan arrives at the Tower of Silver Star to begin her schooling. During her first five days, she meets her teachers and fellow students. On her fifth evening, Lillet wakes to find the Tower under attack from Calvaros's released spirit, who has killed the other teachers and is seeking the Philosopher's Stone. Before he can kill her, the clock strikes midnight and she is sent back to the beginning of her first day at the Tower. During the next three loops of time, Lillet learns more about the Tower's inhabitants and her own situation.

Calvaros's power came from a contract with the demon Grimlet, with Grimlet being imprisoned when Calvaros was defeated. The ghost of Lujie is both fuelling Opalnaria's obsession with Chartruese—who was cursed when he refused Lujie's advances—and instructing her in a ritual to destroy Grimlet that will fail due to being incomplete. Bartido is a spy from another country sent to find the Philosopher's Stone. Margarita is revealed to be a spy for Calvaros's followers, sent to free him. Amoretta possessing an angel's soul means she can destroy Grimlet by sacrificing herself; in two of the loops, she lets this happen. Lillet also learns the mechanics of demon contracts, including the fact that if a human's wish is refused the demon is trapped in Hell. She gains the powerful Lemegaton grimoire from Advocat using a contract, which is nullified by the next time loop.

On the fifth loop, Lillet has Lujie prevent Opalnaria using the incomplete ritual; gives shelter to Amoretta to prevent her from dying; helps settle the feud between Opalnaria and Chartruese, which indirectly leads to a romance between Opalnaria and Hiram; and frees Margarita from Calvaros's power. Summoning Grimlet with the Lemegaton so he can devour Calvaros, she then makes a contract with him and wishes that he embrace God; refusing the wish, Grimlet is banished to Hell. Discovering the Philosopher's Stone under her room, she finds an older version of herself. It turns out Lillet has already gone through the cycle of time loops thousands of times, with a version of Lillet remaining near the Stone to ensure the loop remains stable. Lillet breaks the loop by destroying the Philosopher's Stone, causing her older self to vanish. Lillet graduates and becomes Mage Consul to the country's capital, Bartido and Margarita leave the Tower, and Amoretta lives with Lillet. Visiting the Tower years later in her role as Mage Consul, Lillet meets remaining residents again, and learns that Lujie vanished into another world.

== Development ==
Vanillaware was established by George Kamitani along with a small group to develop Odin Sphere, a successor to Kamitani's 1996 video game Princess Crown. While development on Odin Sphere was ongoing, Nippon Ichi Software heard that the Princess Crown team had formed their own studio. Interested in working with them, the then-president of Nippon Ichi Software, Sohei Niikawa, contacted Vanillaware. Niikawa later said he "fell in love" with Kamitani's artwork, prompting the initial inquiries. This was part of a transition within Nippon Ichi Software of being willing to work with external studios while acting as publisher, as their earlier policy had focused exclusively on in-house development. In a press release, the game was described as a co-production between Vanillaware and Nippon Ichi Software.

While GrimGrimoire was the second Vanillaware project after Odin Sphere, it was the first to release due to being completed in a shorter timespan, ultimately securing a release date a month before the scheduled release of Odin Sphere by Atlus. The agreement between the two was that Vanillaware to handle development and all associated costs, while Nippon Ichi Software focused on sales and promotion while owning the game IP. According to differing estimates by Kamitani, the project took between six months and a year to complete, a schedule attributed to deadlines set by Nippon Ichi Software. The production of GrimGrimoire combined with the delayed release of Odin Sphere left Vanillaware drained of funds, forcing Kamitani to take out a flexible loan of 20 million yen to keep the company afloat.

Niikawa wanted to collaborate on a game, and gave Vanillaware complete creative freedom. Due to this, the team did not restrain themselves and designed the game without considering its long-term commercial viability. Kamitani and many Vanillaware staff were fans and avid players of the real-time strategy game StarCraft. Due to this shared passion, they decided to create a fantasy-themed side-scrolling RTS. Kamitani later said his state of excitement over the project led to many of the decisions abound the story, deriving thematic cues from the universes of Atelier Marie: The Alchemist of Salburg and the Harry Potter series. Time and budget constraints lead to the number of characters being kept very low, and as a result a repeating timeloop was incorporated into the story. Due to the staff's familiarity with StarCraft, the gameplay was designed very quickly, but as Japanese gamers were not used to the RTS genre, they had to lower the difficulty and make the game user-friendly to genre newcomers. The original plan for explorable adventure game segments instead of the final cutscene-based narrative was cut due to time constraints.

The initial character concepts were created by Kamitani; the character designs were handled by Kouichi Maenou, whose previous notable work was Sakurazaka Shouboutai published by Irem. Kamitani had wanted Atelier illustrator Kohime Ohse to design the characters, but the plan fell through due to budget limitations. Maenou worked a long time on Lillet Blan's designs, with it going through five separate drafts before the final version was approved. Like Odin Sphere, Vanillaware used 2D rather than 3D graphics that were dominating the game industry: Kamitani wanted GrimGrimoire and Odin Sphere to be the new leading edge for 2D art design. As with his games since Princess Crown, in-game character models were 2D artwork animated using "multi-jointing", a technique later associated with Adobe Flash animation. The scale and quality of the designs was severely limited by time constraints. Kamitani said that the character animations and the "fish bowl" perspective of cutscenes turned out better than expected in the final product. A notable part of the collaboration between Vanillaware and Nippon Ichi Software was the character Lujie Piche, who also appeared in Soul Nomad & the World Eaters. Lujie was originally designed for GrimGrimoire, but Nippon Ichi Software thought the character would be a good fit with the visuals and style of Soul Nomad.

=== Music ===
The music was composed by a team at Basiscape, a music and sound studio founded by Hitoshi Sakimoto. Sakimoto composed the score for GrimGrimoire alongside Masaharu Iwata, Kimihiro Abe, Mitsuhiro Kaneda and Noriyuki Kamikura. Sakimoto also created the main theme, and all the composers helped with arrangements. During his earliest work, Sakimoto had trouble understanding Kamitani's intentions for the game, so went with a small number of instruments and a feeling of homeliness. Later when he saw the game late in development, Sakimoto changed to include more instruments. The score also featured contributions from Hiroaki Yura and his Eminence Symphony Orchestra.

An eighteen-track album for the game was released as a pre-order bonus in Japan. In North America, the soundtrack released both as part of the Silver Star Special edition and as a standalone release. The original prints of both versions suffered problems; the track list was incorrectly printed in Japan and corrected through an online list, while the North American version had the tracks in a file format unplayable by standard CD players which was corrected following release. The album has garnered mixed to positive reviews.

== Release ==
GrimGrimoire was originally announced in November 2006, releasing in Japan on April 12, 2007. Pre-orders of the game came with a booklet of illustrations created by Kamitani and Maenou. A strategy guide was released on June 12, featuring breakdowns of levels and concept art of the characters and setting.

The game was localised by NIS America, with voice recording handled by PSB Productions, which had already handled titles in Nippon Ichi Software's Disgaea series. It was NIS America's first release in the RTS genre. It was released in North America on June 26, coming in a standard edition and a limited "Silver Star Special" edition which came with a soundtrack CD and downloadable strategy guide. In Europe, GrimGrimoire was published by Koei on September 28. Its release in the region was timed to be soon after the final Harry Potter book The Deathly Hallows. GrimGrimoire was later released on the PlayStation Network (PlayStation 3) as a Classic title; it was published in 2011 in North America and 2014 in Japan.

=== GrimGrimoire OnceMore ===
An expanded remaster titled GrimGrimoire OnceMore was released on July 28, 2022, on PlayStation 4 and Nintendo Switch in Japan. It was released for PlayStation 4, Nintendo Switch and PlayStation 5 worldwide in April 2023. The remaster included graphical enhancements for the new consoles, an art gallery, fast forward and mid-battle save options, adjustments to the Hard difficulty setting, gameplay expansions through the incorporation of skill trees for Familiars and powerful magical attacks, and a new voice cast. The remaster was directed by Yoshio Nishimura, a Vanillaware staff member who joined after GrimGrimoire released due to his love of the game. Nishimura pushed for a remaster of GrimGrimoire, which Nippon Ichi Software agreed to. The expanded gameplay elements were created to both add replay value and further increase options for genre beginners. Due to the low quality of the PlayStation 2 versions's voice recordings, which were all they had access to, the team opted to re-record the Japanese dialogue with a new voice cast. Production of the remaster took ten months.

== Reception ==
Reception

Aggregate scores
Aggregator	Score
GameRankings	78%
Metacritic	79/100 (PS2); 78/100 (Switch); 75/100 (PS5)

Review scores
Publication	Score
1Up.com	C+
Edge	7/10
Eurogamer	8/10
Famitsu	28/40
Game Informer	7.75/10
GamePro	3/5
GameSpot	8.4/10
IGN	8.4/10
PALGN	7/10

In Japan, GrimGrimoire debuted in second place during its week of release behind Apollo Justice: Ace Attorney, selling over 17,000 units. By the end of the year, it had sold over 26,600 units. Ultimately, GrimGrimoire was a commercial disappointment. The Nintendo Switch version of GrimGrimoire OnceMore was the twenty-fourth bestselling retail game during its first week of release in Japan, with 3,524 physical copies being sold.

GrimGrimoire was well received by the gaming press. It received an average rating of 78% on GameRankings based on 41 critic reviews. On Metacritic, the game garnered a score of 79/100 based on 39 reviews, indicating "generally favorable reviews". The reviewers for Famitsu gave a lot of praise to the game's aesthetics and style, but one writer found the gameplay too challenging at times. Simon Parkin of Eurogamer was generally positive, calling it one of the most innovative Japanese games of the year. GameSpot's Kevin VanOrd called GrimGrimoire "a fun and terrific gem waiting to be discovered". Adam Biesenner, writing for Game Informer, struggled to recommend it due to issues with its controls and gameplay despite enjoying the deeper experience; this opinion was backed up by fellow writer Joe Juba.

Greg Miller of IGN enjoyed his time playing it, but due to its mechanical faults could not rate the game any higher than he did in the review. PALGN's Tristan Kalogeropoulos described the game as just short of being a great title due to its mechanical issues. Edge enjoyed the title but found the repetitive elements brought the quality down over time. Greg Sewart of 1UP.com said the game felt "too watered-down and too repetitive" compared to other titles from Nippon Ichi Software. GamePro found the title generally inferior to the other console RTS titles available at the time despite compelling gameplay elements.

The story divided opinion; many praised its style and writing, while others found fault in those same elements or called it overly derivative. The graphics earned high praise despite a lack of variety in battle arenas, while the music and voice acting met with a mixed reaction. There was praise on its implementation of RTS elements on consoles despite the limited scope; common complaints arose from rough controls and a lack of meaningful progress.

== Legacy ==
Kamitani said that GrimGrimoire was the only project he ever designed with the intent of creating a sequel, and despite wishes to do so, Nippon Ichi Software did not put in any requests. Based on this, Kamitani has since made sure to write stories that would stand on their own. Vanillaware later returned to their concept plans for GrimGrimoire when developing the 2019 science fiction-themed game 13 Sentinels: Aegis Rim.
