= Net Ghost PiPoPa =

Japanese anime television series

ネットゴーストPIPOPA (Netto Gōsuto Pipopa)
- Genre: Comedy, Science fiction
- Anime television series
- Directed by: Shinichiro Kimura
- Written by: Yasunori Yamada
- Music by: Motoyoshi Iwasaki
- Studio: Studio Hibari
- Original network: TV Tokyo, TVh, TVA, TVO, TSC, TVQ, Toon Disney, AT-X, Disney XD
- Original run: April 6, 2008 – March 29, 2009
- Episodes: 51
- Manga
- Written by: Konami Suzuki
- Published by: Kadokawa Shoten
- Magazine: Kerokero Ace
- Published: 2008
- Volumes: 1
- Video game

Net Ghost PiPoPa: PiPoPa×DS@Big Adventure!!!
- Developer: Dimple Entertainment
- Publisher: Dimple Entertainment
- Genre: Simulation RPG
- Platform: Nintendo DS
- Released: February 26, 2009

Net Ghost PiPoPa (ネットゴーストPIPOPA(ピポパ), Netto Gōsuto Pipopa) is a Japanese anime television series directed by Shinichiro Kimura. It premiered on TV Tokyo on April 6, 2008. A manga adaptation was serialized in Kerokero Ace. It is also streamed in the United States on Crunchyroll under the title Web Ghosts PiPoPa since December 2008. An English language pilot was produced by William Winckler Productions in 2017.

A spin-off game entitled Net Ghost PiPoPa: PiPoPa×DS@Big Adventure!!! (ネットゴーストPIPOPA ピポパ×DS@ダイボウケン!!!, Netto Gōsuto PIPOPA Pipopa × DS Dai Bouken!!!) was also released for the Nintendo DS.

Pipopa is an onomatopoeia of computer beeps.

== Overview ==
The story is about a boy, Yūta Akikawa, who is afraid of computers. His family moves to Kamimai City, a technologically advanced city, where his mother works. The same day, he receives a mysterious encrypted message from an anonymous source. When he opens this, he is transported into the Net World, meeting three Web Ghosts known as Pit, Pot, and Pat. Here, the three Web Ghosts, whom Yūta dubs as PiPoPa, explain to Yūta that the Net World is what is going on inside of all outside computers, cell phones, and all technology. Yūta decides to hide this discovery from his friends and family, and he uses this to his advantage to help friends in need and prevent technological mishaps.

== Characters ==
- Yūta Akikawa (秋川 勇太, Akikawa Yūta) Voiced by: Rina Satō

Yūta is a school boy who is afraid of computers, but is fond of astronomy. One day, he was sucked inside his cellphone where he met Pit, Pot and Pat. As his adventure continues, he protects the Web World along with PiPoPa.

- Hikaru Sofue (祖父江 ひかる, Sofue Hikaru) Voiced by: Sayuri Yahagi

Hikaru is the first person that Yūta met in Kamimai City. She is the one who mostly shows Yūta how things go around in Kamimai. They became classmates in school. Eventually, Hikaru managed to get Yuta to allow her to go to the Web World. Her Web Ghost is Ecolon.

- Pit (ピット, Pitto) Voiced by: Ryōko Shiraishi

Pit is a hotheaded net ghost who can transform into a car, a plane, a UFO, a stamper (under the right conditions) and various other things. Pit, along with Pot and Pat hate to be called PiPoPa, but Pit is the one who hates it most.

- Pot (ポット, Potto) Voiced by: Satomi Arai

Pot is a goofy net ghost who always likes to eat. He also has the most affection towards girls. He has been helpful on many occasions, and claims he can also shift his hands into a stamper similar to Pit. However, it is unknown if the effect can be replicated.

- Pat (パット, Patto) Voiced by: Masahito Yabe

Pat is the logical computer whiz of the group, calculating many things. He is the one that finds the "virus core" in Web Monsters.

- Pū / Seiren (プー（セイレーン）, Pū (Siren)) Voiced by: Aki Toyosaki, Ayahi Takagaki (singing voice)

Project Siren is a top secret project hidden inside the Dream Future facility in Kamimai. She escapes and becomes friends with the PiPoPa trio. It is later known that she is not the original, and there was one before her.

- Mamoru Shindo (進藤 守, Shindō Mamoru) Voiced by: Kahoru Sasajima

Mamoru is one of the best friends of Yūta. He taught him the basics of computers, and he is a computer programming expert. It is later revealed that Divine Forest was Mamoru, in a sense.

- Kazushige Enoshima (江ノ島 カズシゲ) Voiced by: Takashi Mito

Kazushige is a bully at school and one of Yūta's classmates. He has a crush on Hikaru and Sayaka plus he also becomes frustrated when Yūta gets close to either of them. Kazushige eventually catches and Yuta going to the Web World. He is also "Dynagon", a poet that Hikaru adores. Kazushige's Web Ghosts are Bit, Bot, and Bat.

- Shuzo Matsushita (松下 シュウゾウ, Matsushita Shūzō) Voiced by: Tsubasa Yonaga and Kosuke Kitayama (北山 コースケ, Kitayama Kōsuke) Voiced by: Asami Yaguchi

Kazushige's friends and underlings.

- Web Venus (ネットヴィーナス, Netto Vīnasu) Voiced by: Kaori Shimizu

Web Venus is a very mysterious web ghost who frequently appears near Pit, Pot and Pat. Apparently, she defends peace in the Web World but works only by herself. Web Venus is actually Sayaka, using an avatar achieved by a web diving machine. ^{[ep. 32]}

- Kenta Akikawa (秋川 健太, Akikawa Kenta) Voiced by: Tomoyuki Shimura

A photographer, Kenta is Yūta's father.

- Yūko Akikawa (秋川 優子, Akikawa Yūko) Voiced by: Saori Seto

A programmer at Dream Future Japan, Yūko is Yūta's mother.

- Juzo Sofue (祖父江 十三, Sofue Jūzō) Voiced by: Takeshi Maruyama

Juzo is Hikaru's grandfather and is very protective of Hikaru. He also specializes in the internet. He rejects the ideas of Dream Future. It is also notable that he is addicted to pudding.

- BiBoBa (ビボバ) (Bit (ビット, Bitto) Voiced by: Takeshi Maruyama, Bot (ボット, Botto) Voiced by: Sayaka Kinoshita, and Bat (バット, Batto) Voiced by: Yuko Gibu)

BiBoBa has been the mortal rivals of PiPoPa, although they team up later. Like their rivals, they hate to be called BiBoBa. ^{[ep. 5]}

- Jin Kazama (風間 ジン, Kazama Jin) Voiced by: Masahito Yabe

Kazama is the president of the Dream Future Japanese branch.

- Azusa Sakamoto (坂本 あずさ, Sakamoto Azusa) Voiced by: Ayahi Takagaki

Sakamoto works under Kazama as time manager. She remains faithful to Kazama even after he was fired.

- Tomio Hirame (平目 富雄, Hirame Tomio) Voiced by: Teruyuki Tanzawa

A no-good man, Hirame worked as a chief in Dream Future. After Kazama was fired, he was assigned as the president.

- Karin Yukitani (雪谷 花梨, Yukitani Karin) Voiced by: Ayahi Takagaki

She is a friend of Hikaru. In one episode, Hikaru and Yūta help her set-up the website for Karin's inn.

- Yuzuru Aizawa (相沢 譲, Aizawa Yuzuru) Voiced by: Hiroki Tochi

A seemingly poor person looking for a permanent job. He seems to be a bit computer literate. Undercover, he is a member of the internet police. He has developed feelings for Yūta and Hikaru's teacher Eriko.

- Eriko Murata (村田 エリ子, Murata Eriko) Voiced by: Sayaka Kinoshita

The young-at-heart homeroom teacher of Yūta's homeroom class. In privacy, she takes on the role of a net idol named EriEri.

- Ecolon (エコロン, Ekoron) Voiced by: Ayano Ishikawa

An ecology focused net ghost. He is the net ghost of Hikaru's favorite website. Without him, Hikaru cannot net dive (in the same way as with Yūta and Pi Po Pa) unless with someone else who can net dive (as seen in episode 13).

- Sayaka Erenkova (サヤカ・エレンコワ, Sayaka Erenkowa) Voiced by: Ui Miyazaki

A Russian transfer student. She can speak Russian and some Japanese. By the end of the series she can say more Japanese than she did at the beginning. She is also Web Venus, achieved through a web diving machine.

- Seiko Erenkova (セイコ・エレンコワ, Seiko Erenkowa) Voiced by: Kaori Shimizu

Sayaka's mother who looks like Web Venus. She was a former assistant at Dream Future and a friend of Juzo in research.

- The Dream Future Big Four
  A special division in Dream Future made purely of data.
  - Ash (アッシュ, Asshu) Voiced by: Tetsuya Motomura
    The head of the American branch, Ash specializes in throwing cards.
  - Langa (ランガ, Ranga)
    The head of the Asian branch, Langa is able to hypnotize.
  - François (フランソワ, Furansowa)
    The head of the European branch.
  - Mohammad (モハンマド, Mohamado) Voiced by: Akira Harada
    The head of the North African branch.
- Doctor Forest (ドクターフォレスト, Dokutā Foresuto) Voiced by: Hajime Iijima

The founder of Dream Future and grandfather of Mamoru. After a mysterious accident, Doctor Forest went ill and was sent to the hospital and has never woken up since.

- Divine Forest (ディバイン・フォレスト, Dibain Foresuto) Voiced by: Yuichi Nakamura

A person who forcibly became the leader of the Dream Future Big Four. He has the ability to turn web ghosts into web monsters.

== Theme songs ==
Opening songs

1. "Password@PiPoPa" (パスワード@PIPOPA, Pasuwādo Pipopa) by Atsuko Bungo (episodes 2–4)
2. "Get On Up" by Sugimoto Shimai (5-26)
3. "Password@PiPoPa" (パスワード@PIPOPA, Pasuwādo Pipopa) by COON (27–50)

Ending songs

1. "Hoshi Kirari" (星キラリ) by COON (1-26)
2. "Virtual Love" (ヴァーチャル☆ラブ, Vācharu Rabu) by Sugimoto Shimai (27–50)

== Reception ==
Famicom Tsūshin scored the game a 18 out of 40, making it one of the lowest rated Nintendo DS games of that year.
