= Unicorn Overlord =

2024 video game

- Developer: Vanillaware
- Publisher: Sega: JP: Atlus
- Director: Takafumi Noma
- Producer: Akiyasu Yamamoto
- Designer: Wataru Nakanishi
- Programmer: Takafumi Noma
- Artists: Takafumi Noma; Masami Yanagi
- Writer: Takafumi Noma
- Composers: Mitsuhiro Kaneda: Yoshimi Kudo; Rikako Watanabe; Richter; Toki Takeda; Denys Fontanarosa
- Platforms: Nintendo Switch; PlayStation 4; PlayStation 5; Xbox Series X/S
- Release: March 8, 2024
- Genre: Tactical role-playing
- Modes: Single-player, multiplayer

Unicorn Overlord (Note: Japanese: ユニコーンオーバーロード, Hepburn: Yunikōn Ōbārōdo) is a 2024 tactical role-playing game developed by Vanillaware and published by Atlus in Japan, and Sega worldwide, for Nintendo Switch, PlayStation 4, PlayStation 5 and Xbox Series X/S. Set on the continent of Fevrith as it is consumed by war, the story follows exiled prince Alain as he gathers allies to liberate the nations of Fevrith from the Zenoiran Empire. Gameplay follows Alain and his army units fighting in large-scale battles, with field movement and battles taking place in real-time.

The concept for Unicorn Overlord was created by Takafumi Noma in 2014. With company founder George Kamitani's blessing, Noma took on the roles of director, programmer, and lead artist. The aim was to create a modern version of classic tactical games from the 1990s. Production took roughly ten years due to overlapping with other Vanillaware projects. Basiscape, a music studio founded by Hitoshi Sakimoto, composed the soundtrack. The game has received positive reviews and sold over one million copies by September 2024. Praise was given to its gameplay mechanics and visuals, but sentiment towards its story and design complexity was more mixed.

== Gameplay ==
A battle encounter in Unicorn Overlord

Unicorn Overlord is a tactical role-playing game in which players take on the role of exiled prince Alain as he leads the Liberation Army in a campaign across the fantasy realm of Fevrith. During exploration, the player guides Alain across an overworld to enter towns, use services such as blacksmiths and merchants to outfit his army, and engage in story or optional battles. In areas not controlled by Alain or his allies, enemies represented by sprites also wander the overworld. All the characters, locations and sprites are displayed using 2D art.

The number of units that can be deployed during combat sections depends on a resource called Valor, which can be earned by completing battles. The overworld is freely explorable, allowing players to tackle some events in a different order. Towns also include side quests which require the player to gather materials and events where Alain can improve his relationship with a character. During the campaign, new characters either join as part of the storyline, or can be recruited. Some possible recruits are former enemies, with the player's choice to either spare or kill them impacting future story events.

Combat is split between movement of troops across large battlefields, and combat when two units meet. All combat takes place in real time, but the player can pause to change strategy and check on units. Parties are made up of up to five characters with an assigned character class. During the early game units are limited to two characters, but more character slots can be unlocked using a currency called Honors. Battlefield settings include open field areas, and urban environments such as towns and cities which alter gameplay. Some battles have gimmicks for players to exploit, such as a fire within the environment, or siege weapons that can be controlled by either the player or the enemy side.

Units are arranged in a grid, with their position influencing their abilities and combat efficiency. Some character classes are designed for short or long range exclusively, while others have a more varied attack range or a different set of skills. Battles play out automatically based on character attributes and player-set behaviors. Battles last until either one side is defeated, or both sides run out of points used to perform actions, which stuns the defeated unit for a time. Three currencies—Gold for buying items and equipment, Honors for hiring mercenaries, unlocking more parties and character slots and promoting units to higher grade classes, and Renown which dictates player options with using Honors—are earned through either completing battles or exploring the map and completing objectives. There are multiple difficulty settings which players can select, and after a certain point an online multiplayer mode is unlocked separate from the main story which allows players to pit AI-controlled squads against each other.

== Synopsis ==
General Valmore of the kingdom of Cornia leads a rebellion against the ruling monarch Queen Ilenia. With most of the army siding with Valmore, Ilenia has her personal guard Josef smuggle her son Alain as well as the symbol of Cornian royalty, the Ring of the Unicorn, to safety. Josef reluctantly follows Ilenia's orders and flees as Ilenia makes her last stand against Valmore to buy them time to escape. Ten years later, Valmore—renaming himself Galerius—has reformed the ancient Zenoirian Empire and subjugated surrounding nations: Drakenhold, an old enemy of Cornia; the elvish land of Elheim; Bastorias land of the hybrid Beastmen; and Albion, a religious nation controlled by angels.

Alain has been raised by Josef on the remote island of Palevia alongside the local priestess Scarlett to eventually take leadership of the Liberation Army. When Zenoiran forces attack the island, Alain takes up arms and successfully protects the local populace. He finds out that the Ring of the Unicorn has the power to dispel Galerius's mind control magic, which Galerius had been using to turn many to his side. Accepting his role as the leader of the Liberation Army, Alain travels back to Cornia to take charge, but Scarlett is kidnapped by Galerius for an unknown purpose. Alain then begins liberating Cornia from Zenoiran rule and recruiting allies until he is strong enough to rescue Scarlett. However, he is too late to stop Galerius and his sorcerer Baltro from destroying the last magical seal limiting Galerius's power. Galerius and Baltro then leave to continue their plans while the spirit of an ancient Great Sage advises Alain to travel to Elheim to unlock the Ring of the Unicorn's true power.

Alain leads the Liberation Army to the surrounding nations, ousting the Zenoiran occupiers, restoring the original leadership, securing their allegiances, and recruiting additional allies. During the campaign, Alain learns that the Ring of the Unicorn must be paired with the Ring of the Maiden in order to perform the "rite of covenant" at a special altar in order to unbind it. While they are able to secure the Ring of the Maiden from Elheim, knowledge of the altar's location is lost. In addition, Alain learns that Galerius's mind control is a special spell called the "rite of channeling" which allows a Zenoiran soul to possess a living body. With the nations surrounding Cornia liberated, the Liberation Army prepares to siege Cornia's capital, Gran Corrine. In order to unbind the Ring of the Unicorn, Alain returns to Palevia, reasoning that the Altar of the Unicorn and Maiden located there is the altar where the rite of covenant must be performed. There, Alain can perform the rite of covenant by gifting the Ring of the Maiden to a chosen follower.

Alain can then go on a pilgrimage to each of the six sanctuaries to further empower the Ring of the Unicorn and encounter the Great Sages overseeing each sanctuary. The Great Sages explain that the Zenoira Empire was founded by Galerius, who arrived from a different continent after the previous Zenoiran Empire was destroyed in a civil war. Galerius conquered Fevrith, rebuilt Zenoira, and then killed the divine Unicorn in an attempt to steal its power and grant all Zenoirans immortality. The Unicorn's death triggered a curse that destroyed Zenoira overnight and prevented its people's souls from ascending to the afterlife. The Great Sages task Alain with using the fully empowered Ring of the Unicorn to break the Unicorn's curse. The Liberation Army and its allies assault Gran Corrine as Galerius attempts to perform a special rite of channeling to possess Gran Corrine's population. Alain defeats Galerius in battle, leading to three possible endings:

- If Alain fights Galerius without unbinding the Ring of the Unicorn, he kills Galerius and ends up becoming possessed by Galerius's spirit. With the only power capable of defeating him gone, nothing stops Galerius from conquering the entire world and setting up an eternal Zenoiran Empire.
- If Alain unbinds the Ring of the Unicorn but does not visit all six sanctuaries, Alain is forced to kill Galerius, revealed to be possessing Ilenia's body. Galerius then attempts to possess Alain, but his spirit is repelled by the power of the Rings and destroyed. With Zenoira defeated, Alain is crowned the new king of Cornia and rules alongside his chosen partner while his companions go their separate ways to rebuild Fevrith.
- If Alain unbinds the Ring of the Unicorn and visits all six sanctuaries, he has the option to purify Galerius rather than kill him. Galerius resists until he is betrayed by Baltro, who absorbs his soul from Ilenia's body. Baltro intends to use the Zenoiran souls as a power source for his magic. Alain uses the Ring of the Unicorn to cleanse the Zenoiran souls and convinces them to fight back against Baltro. Aided by the Great Sages, Alain kills Baltro and breaks the Unicorn's curse, allowing the Zenoiran souls to pass into the afterlife. Afterwards, Ilenia abdicates the throne to Alain and he rules Cornia alongside his chosen partner, while his companions go their separate ways to rebuild Fevrith.

== Development ==
The design concept for Unicorn Overlord was created by Takafumi Noma of Vanillaware in 2014, almost exactly ten years prior to release. Noma had been approached by company founder George Kamitani after production ended on Dragon's Crown (2013) to create a new fantasy-themed video game. With Kamitani's encouragement, Noma led the project and acted as director, character designer, and lead programmer. The designer was Wataru Nakanishi, while Akiyasu Yamamoto of Atlus produced. Production moved slowly due to Vanillaware working in parallel on other projects, including ports of earlier titles and 13 Sentinels: Aegis Rim. Noma needed to personally join the 13 Sentinels team to help with programming. Near the game's release, Kamitani noted that the game's production drained Vanillaware's funds and he had to continue funding the project out of his own pocket, a common occurrence with the studio's projects. Noma commented that the team were able to incorporate almost everything they wanted into the final product, though it went through multiple large-scale redesigns to the point that each felt like its own game.

Noma created the gameplay concepts with Nakanishi, who described the process as the two making things up as they went and receiving advice from Kamitani. As Vanillaware had emulated the arcade beat em' up design for Dragon's Crown, Noma wanted Unicorn Overlord to emulate the classic tactical RPG titles of the 1990s without drawing specific inspiration from any of them. The gameplay was designed to give a sense of speed, focusing on an overhead perspective, player freedom, and real-time movement and combat. The team's goal, along with returning to the studio's established fantasy theme, was a "rebirth" of tactical RPGs, paying homage to earlier titles while making it accessible to genre newcomers. The automated nature of battles was intended to balance customization with ease of use, as commanding individual units could become overwhelming given the size of battles. The Valor system was directly inspired by the meta skills system used in 13 Sentinels. The online elements were intended as an evolution of the multiplayer matches from Dragon's Crown.

Speaking about the narrative, Noma stated it was only finalized and completed later in the development process, with its basic setting and gameplay being created first. He described the world design as inspired by 14th century Europe blended with Japanese fantasy elements. In reference to the games from which they drew inspiration, the storyline was written to emphasise commonality across a diverse cast through a linear story, and multiple fantasy races were created for the world. Originally both elves and dwarfs were to be included, but after looking into the Norse mythology the team were drawing on, they opted to focus on light and dark elves. The angels were almost not included due to limited resources, but they were incorporated when staff joined following the completion of 13 Sentinels. Two of the characters were written as homages to 13 Sentinels characters Hijiyama and Okino, with Kamitani writing their dialogue.

While Noma had mostly been a programmer with Vanillaware, he was also a keen illustrator, and took the opportunity to lead character design for Unicorn Overlord. The artistic design was settled on from the first piece of concept art, with the art design paying tribute to the titles that inspired the team. The illustrations were completed early on, and helped get the project approved by Atlus. Noma noted that some of his design priorities had changed, with the key art focusing less on key characters and more on the common soldiers in the final version. As with other Vanillware projects, the art focused on 2D designs, contrasting against the 3D graphics dominating most of the games industry. The large number of unique characters was not planned from the outset, but came about as development progressed and more elements were added by Noma. For the food, veteran artist Takehiro Shiga (Shigatake) was asked to provide illustrations.

=== Music ===
The music was composed by a team from Basiscape led by Mitsuhiro Kaneda. Basiscape is a frequent collaborator with Vanillaware, scoring all their games since the company's founding up to 13 Sentinels. Kanada composed and arranged the score together with Yoshimi Kudo, Rikako Watanabe, Richter, Toki Takeda, and Denys Fontanarosa of Artisan Studios. Kaneda, who had worked on 13 Sentinels, was described by Nakanishi as creating a score with a new sound benefiting their goals for the game design. The score was composed around the idea of an "orthodox RPG". For the main antagonist's character theme, a zither was used to emphasise his unique background. The vocals and lyrics were created by Japanese singer-songwriter Eureka Republic.

A full soundtrack album released in Japan alongside the game on March 8. Published by Basiscape's record label, the 4-disc album includes 84 tracks. Two further albums, featuring acoustic and orchestrated arrangements, released in May 2024 and June 2025 respectively. All three albums were released for streaming services worldwide in June 2025.

== Release ==
Unicorn Overlord was first teased with a short film included in the commercial demo disc 13 Sentinels: Aegis Rim Prologue. Kamitani confirmed that the project was nearing completion in January 2023, calling it Vanillaware's biggest project to date. The game was officially announced, together with Japanese and Western special editions, in September during a Nintendo Direct. The special editions include an art book, a soundtrack disc and an original card game. It was published by Atlus in Japan, and parent company Sega worldwide. A demo covering the game's opening was published on February 23, allowing players to transfer their save into the full game.

The game was released worldwide on March 8, 2024 for Nintendo Switch, PlayStation 4, PlayStation 5, and Xbox Series X/S. When asked about a Windows version, Yamamoto stated that while Atlus wanted it, their agreement with Vanillaware kept the game console-exclusive. The localization was handled by veteran company 8-4. During the preview stage, the localization drew negative comments on social media for its deviations from the Japanese text, prompting Ogre Battle creator Yasumi Matsuno to comment on it. He noted that the changes were acceptable provided they were done with the developer's knowledge and consent, citing equivalent experiences during his work on Final Fantasy Tactics. A day one patch allowed transfer of save data from the demo, a new difficulty level, and technical improvements. A further patch released in April addressed a recurring bug and quality of life improvements to unit management and the interface.

== Reception ==
Reception

Aggregate scores
Aggregator	Score
Metacritic	(PS5) 86/100 (XBSX) 87/100 (NS) 89/100
OpenCritic	98% recommend

Review scores
Publication	Score
Eurogamer	4/5
Famitsu	36/40
Game Informer	8.5/10
GameSpot	8/10
IGN	9/10
Nintendo Life	9/10
RPGFan	92/100

Reviewers for Japanese gaming magazine Famitsu positively noted the expansive scope of the story and interactions between Alain and other characters. Game Informer's Matt Miller enjoyed the narrative despite noting the use of genre tropes in the story and characters. Kaan Serin of Eurogamer noted the derivative nature of the narrative, but felt character vignettes expanded and fleshed out the setting. Joshua Lindquist of RPGFan enjoyed the side stories more than the main plot, though he positively noted that later plot twists relieved some concerns about the generic premise. IGN's Eric Zalewski noted the generic premise and some uneven writing across the five main story arcs, but enjoyed the narrative's grey morality and character side stories. Heidi Kemps, writing for GameSpot, described the unoriginality of the narrative as the game's main flaw. Alana Hagues of Nintendo Life had similar feelings, though noted the later narrative elements were stronger.

The illustrated artwork was praised by Famitsu, with one reviewer saying the designs enhanced the story and gameplay delivery. Zalewski lauded the diverse character designs and detailed animation, while positively comparing the overworld to board game maps. Miller lauded the environmental and character design despite the overuse of dramatic animation in combat. Kemps, while noting the UI becoming crowded at times, lauded the background and character art and animation. Hagues praised the art design, positively noting a lack of technical issues. Lindquist lauded the battle scene animations as some of the best he had seen, and gave praise to the character and class designs. The voice acting and music was praised by multiple reviewers.

Famitsu praised the gameplay depth and level of customization offered to players, Hagues was enthusiastic in praising both the number and the depth of the various systems, further lauding its tutorial system and side activities. Serin positively noted the design's balance of real-time and role-playing systems, and stated that the slow build-up of systems meant he was not as overwhelmed as he might have been. Kemps was impressed by the scope and depth of the systems, praising the overall gameplay as a fun and engaging experience. Zalewski was also enthusiastic, citing the combat as one of his new favorites in the genre, but found managing the large number of units overwhelming. Miller praised the combat design, but found that the amount of systems and character control became overwhelming as he got deeper into the campaign. Lindquist praised the design of environments, battle stages, and freedom of movement in combat, but like other reviewers felt the systems were too complex for casual players.

=== Sales ===
Unicorn Overlord was in high demand in Japan, with retailers running short of physical copies during its week of release, selling over 74,000 copies across Switch and PlayStation platforms. In the United Kingdom, the game entered the top ten best-selling titles of the week, with most of its sales being for the Switch. In less than a month, physical shipments and digital sales had reached 500,000 copies worldwide, and reached one million by September.

=== Awards and nominations ===
Awards and nominations for Unicorn Overlord
Year	Ceremony	Category	Result	Ref.
2024	Japan Game Awards 2024	Award for Excellence	Won	
2024	The Game Awards 2024	Best Sim/Strategy Game	Nominated	
