= Netrun-mon =

2004 original video animation

- Logo for the OVA

ねとらん者
- Genre: Comedy
- Original video animation
- Directed by: Akio Watanabe
- Studio: Studio Hibari
- Released: November 24, 2004

Netrun-mon (ねとらん者; "Netrunner") is a single-episode Japanese original video animation which was created to celebrate the fifth anniversary of NetRunner magazine. NetRunner is a controversial publication since some articles promote hacking. Characters that are used to promote the magazine and are sold as merchandise have been taken directly from Hiroyuki's 2channel community. Hiroyuki himself is a character of Netrun-mon, one of the many references to Internet fandom in Japan that the anime is based upon.

== Characters ==
The heroes of the story are two ducks, BB Runner (voiced by Kappei Yamaguchi) and his younger sister Ranna (voiced by Atsuko Enomoto). They are original characters created by NetRunner. They appear on the night before a deadline in the offices of NetRunner magazine, while the employees sleep, to complete their work for them.

=== Main characters ===
- Chiyu (also written as Tiyu, 12 years old), whose design originated from Futaba Channel, is a magical girl who wears mahjong tiles in her hair (both are dragon tiles). She is an angel and has the ability to float and teleport. She appears when the duck siblings are working in the office and she draws BB Runner into her world. (voiced by Halko Momoi) She has a pet called Chuunchuun (voiced by Noboru Maeda)
- Biscuit-tan is another character whose design originated from Futaba Channel. She is an unofficial mascot of the KFC franchise; hence her love of syrup-covered biscuits resembling those served at those restaurants. (voiced by Rumi Shishido)
- Nin`itan is a character from a desktop accessory program (Ukagaka) called Materia, where she is called Sakura. (voiced by Riko Hirai) She has a pet called Unyu (voiced by Yoshiyuki Arai).

=== Other characters ===
- Shigatake's Habanero-tan appears on the toilet numerous times throughout the anime as a running gag.
- Mona who is a catlike Shift_JIS art character born on 2channel. (voiced by Shigeru Chiba)
- Samurai Damashii Ken who originated from a blog site. (voiced by Houchu Ohtsuka)
- Junkies who are high school girls that are actually androids controlled by the antagonist, The Master.
