= Vanillaware =

Japanese video game developer

Vanillaware Ltd.
- Native name: ヴァニラウェア有限会社
- Romanized name: Vanirawea Yūgen-gaisha
- Formerly: Puraguru (2002–2004)
- Type: Yūgen gaisha
- Industry: Video games
- Founded: February 8, 2002; 24 years ago
- Founder: George Kamitani; Takehiro Shiga; Kentaro Ohnishi
- Headquarters: Osaka, Japan
- Key people: George Kamitani (president and game director)
- Products: Odin Sphere; Muramasa; Dragon's Crown; 13 Sentinels
- Number of employees: 39 (2024)
- Website: vanillaware.co.jp

Vanillaware Ltd. (Note: ヴァニラウェア有限会社, Vanirawea Yūgen-gaisha) is a Japanese video game developer based in Osaka. An independent company, it was founded in 2002 under the name Puraguru by George Kamitani, a game developer who had previously worked at Capcom and Atlus, and directed Princess Crown (1997) for the Sega Saturn. Beginning as a small studio developing Fantasy Earth: The Ring of Dominion for Enix, in 2004 the company moved to Osaka, Kansai, and changed its name. Kamitani wanted Vanillaware to create successor projects to Princess Crown, beginning with Odin Sphere.

The company is noted for its use of two-dimensional artwork, with character models having jointed hand-scripted movements similar to Flash animation. Later titles have experimented with layered levels and 2.5D graphics. Kamitani based many of his games on the classic beat 'em up game titles he worked on while at Capcom, which had similarly influenced Princess Crown. Vanillaware debuted with two games in 2007; Odin Sphere, which was delayed by publisher Atlus; and GrimGrimoire, a real-time strategy game for Nippon Ichi Software. They have worked with many different publishers, though most frequently with Atlus.

== History ==
=== Origins ===
Company founder George Kamitani had an extensive career in video games reaching back to the 1980s, working on pixel art for an unnamed company and for Capcom as an artist and designer on Saturday Night Slam Masters and Dungeons & Dragons: Tower of Doom before leaving to become a freelancer. His first effort as a director was at the Kansai branch of Atlus on Princess Crown for the Sega Saturn, released in 1997. Originally planned as a life simulation game similar to Princess Maker 2, he changed it into a role-playing game (RPG) to appeal to Sega. The game was a commercial failure, resulting in Atlus Kansai being closed, Kamitani's team being blacklisted in the industry, and an intended Dreamcast sequel being cancelled. While it was developed prior to Vanillaware's official founding, Princess Crown remains strongly associated with Kamitani and the company.

Between 1998 and 2004, Kamitani continued as a freelance designer for Racjin and then Sony Computer Entertainment, during which time he moved to Tokyo. During his time freelancing, he met with artist Takehiro "Shigatake" Shiga and struck up a friendship. While living in straitened circumstances, he still wanted to create his own games. After Sony, he was hired by Enix as one of the core staff on Fantasy Earth: The Ring of Dominion (later retitled Fantasy Earth Zero). Originally a very small project, it ballooned in scale. To help facilitate its development, Kamitani formed a new company to manage its logistics. At that time, it was known under the name Puraguru. The company consisted of only three employees; Kamitani, Shiga, and programmer Kentaro Ohnishi. Puraguru was officially founded on February 8, 2002.

=== 2002–2006 ===
Under Puraguru and Kamitani's influence as director, Fantasy Earth moved away from its premise of a human-vampire war to a traditional fantasy RPG setting involving princesses. Art designs and 3D models for the cancelled Princess Crown sequel were recycled into Fantasy Earth. The production of the game was stressful for all staff, with problems ranging from technical ones to marketing pressure to the merger of Enix with Square to become Square Enix which happened during its development. Ultimately, Kamitani and Square Enix parted on poor terms, with Kamitani saying Square Enix took the project away from him. Puraguru left production in 2004, resulting in Square Enix giving it to developer Multiterm.

Kamitani moved the company down into offices in the Iwatani No.2 Building in Osaka, Kansai. There, it changed its name to Vanillaware; Kamitani chose the new name to evoke the enduring and timeless popularity of vanilla flavoring in ice cream. Kamitani wanted to create a sequel or successor to Princess Crown, and his team began development on Odin Sphere for PlayStation 2 (PS2) with funding and publishing by Atlus. Kamitani was able to gain support from Atlus thanks to contacts there, overcoming the negative stigma attached to him from the failure of Princess Crown.

Production was completed in 2006, but Atlus delayed its release into the following year so as not to cannibalize the market for their other titles. They also refused to take any more titles from Vanillaware until they saw the sales of Odin Sphere. To keep the company afloat during the delay, Vanillaware took on more projects for other publishers. Kamitani had been approached during production of Odin Sphere by Nippon Ichi Software president Sohei Shinkawa, who was a fan of Princess Crown. As the team were lovers of StarCraft and were given complete creative freedom by Shinkawa, they created a fantasy-themed real-time strategy title for PS2 called GrimGrimoire. GrimGrimoire was completed in a very short time, estimated at around six months. The production of GrimGrimoire entirely drained Vanillaware's funds, and to tide over the period to release Kamitani took out a personal loan of 20 million yen.

=== 2007–2012 ===
Odin Sphere was a critical and commercial success, with its sales allowing Kamitani to pay off his loan, distribute staff bonuses, and help finance future projects. GrimGrimoire met with less commercial success, leading to Kamitani's plans for sequels being scrapped. Following Odin Sphere, the team began a second project which would evolve the gameplay of Princess Crown as Odin Sphere had evolved its narrative. This title was Muramasa: The Demon Blade for the Wii. The concept originated during production of Odin Sphere and was sold to Marvelous Entertainment in 2006, who co-funded production.

During this period, Vanillaware made an attempt at "two-line development", with Shiga leading development on a second project. Titled Kumatanchi, the game was a life simulation title based on Shiga's Habanero-tan mascot character, and co-developed with Shiga's doujinshi group Ashinaga Oji-san. Production was hard, as there were few staff for the project and Shiga was both director and lead artist and animator. Kumatanchi was published in 2008 for the Nintendo DS by Dimple Entertainment. After its release, Shiga voiced his wish to step away from directing further projects, and Vanillaware reverted to producing one game at a time.

Following the completion of Muramasa in 2009, Vanillaware began work on two different projects; Grand Knights History for the PlayStation Portable (PSP), and Dragon's Crown for PlayStation 3 and PlayStation Vita. Born from a wish for Vanillaware and Marvelous Entertainment to work on a PSP title, Grand Knights History changed from previous action-based gameplay to a turn-based structure incorporating multiplayer while preserving the company's signature art style. Its two-year production was led by director Tomohiko Deguchi, with art direction by Kouichi Maenou.

Dragon's Crown was a resurrected version of Kamitani's proposed Princess Crown sequel. After Muramasa, Kamitani pitched the project to different publishers, eventually being accepted by UTV Ignition Entertainment. The title drew inspiration from Capcom's early beat 'em up titles. It was Vanillaware's most expensive project at the time, with a budget of over ¥100 million (over US$1,000,000). The team put a large amount of effort into the game, indirectly leading to the localization of Grand Knights History being cancelled. When UTV Ignition Entertainment was suffering financial troubles, the game was in danger of being cancelled. Kamitani went to Atlus, who agreed to co-produce and fund the project. As part of the agreement, Atlus had right of first refusal for Vanillaware's next project. Ultimately, Dragon's Crown was a great success for Vanillaware.

=== 2013–present ===
Alongside and following Dragon's Crown, four different projects emerged; an original game titled 13 Sentinels: Aegis Rim, and high-definition remakes or re-releases of Muramasa, Odin Sphere and Dragon's Crown. Muramasa Rebirth for the Vita was an expanded port of the original with gameplay tweaks and additional downloadable content (DLC) released under the banner Genroku Legends. Odin Sphere: Leifthrasir for PS3, Vita and PlayStation 4 (PS4) was a remake of Odin Sphere. The team sought to preserve the original narrative while updating the gameplay to be more in line with Muramasa and Dragon's Crown. Dragon's Crown Pro was a port of the original game for PS4 which included support for the console's Pro model.

Kamitani was tired of fantasy worlds after Dragon's Crown and conceived 13 Sentinels: Aegis Rim as a science fiction-themed video game set in the 1980s, combining mecha with a shōjo manga aesthetic. Originally a small domestic project with a toy line tie-in, Kamitani grew frustrated by the publisher's demands and showed it to Atlus. They agreed to take it as a new game aimed at the international market, allowing Kamitani full creative freedom. Production of 13 Sentinels began following the release of Odin Sphere: Leifthrasir in 2015. The team faced numerous problems born from its ambitious thirteen-character narrative, real-time strategy gameplay building off concepts from GrimGrimoire, and more layered artwork and area variety. Kamitani ended up writing the entire scenario by himself and handing character design duties to other staff members. Kamitani later described the game as the culmination of his work and skills up to that point.

13 Sentinels: Aegis Rim was originally planned for PS4 and Vita. It met with several delays, and the Vita version was cancelled so production could focus on the PS4 version. To compensate, a demo-type release called 13 Sentinels: Aegis Rim Prologue was released, with feedback used to adjust the final game. 13 Sentinels was released in Japan in 2019, and later in the West in 2020. The game met with critical praise, a port to the Nintendo Switch was released in 2022, and by 2023 it had sold one million copies worldwide. GrimGrimoire was remastered for PS4 and Switch in 2022, with its 2023 Western release including a port to PlayStation 5. The remaster included gameplay enhancements and improved graphics, along with a new principal voice cast. Vanillaware worked in parallel on a new project teased within 13 Sentinels: Aegis Rim Prologue, described as their biggest project to date. That title, Unicorn Overlord, was released worldwide in 2024. Kamitani is also planning a further title that is some years off, planning on entering full production when Unicorn Overlord releases.

== Games developed ==
Original releases

Year	Title	Launch platforms	Publisher	Additional details
2006	Fantasy Earth: The Ring of Dominion	Windows	Square Enix	Developed from 2002 to 2004 as Puraguru. Released in 2006 under developer Multiterm.
2007	GrimGrimoire	PlayStation 2	Nippon Ichi Software	Co-developed with Nippon Ichi Software.
2007	Odin Sphere	PlayStation 2	Atlus	
2008	Kumatanchi	Nintendo DS	Dimple Entertainment	Co-developed with dojinshi group Ashinaga Oji-san. Exclusive to Japan.
2009	Muramasa: The Demon Blade	Wii	Marvelous Entertainment	
2011	Grand Knights History	PlayStation Portable	Marvelous Entertainment	Exclusive to Japan. Localizations by Xseed Games (North America) and Rising Star Games (Europe) cancelled.
2013	Dragon's Crown	PlayStation 3, PlayStation Vita	Atlus	
2019	13 Sentinels: Aegis Rim	PlayStation 4	Atlus	Nintendo Switch port released in 2022.
2024	Unicorn Overlord	Nintendo Switch, PlayStation 4, PlayStation 5, Xbox Series X/S	Atlus	

Remasters

Year	Title	Launch platforms	Publisher	Additional details
2013	Muramasa Rebirth	PlayStation Vita	Marvelous AQL	Remaster of Muramasa: The Demon Blade, expanded with DLC dubbed Genroku Legends.
2016	Odin Sphere Leifthrasir	PlayStation 3, PlayStation 4, PlayStation Vita	Atlus	Remake of Odin Sphere with updated gameplay.
2018	Dragon's Crown Pro	PlayStation 4	Atlus	Port of Dragon's Crown.
2022	GrimGrimoire OnceMore	Nintendo Switch, PlayStation 4	Nippon Ichi Software	Expanded remaster of GrimGrimoire. Western-exclusive PlayStation 5 port released in 2023.
2027	Muramasa: Revenant Blades	Nintendo Switch, Nintendo Switch 2, PlayStation 5, Windows	Marvelous	An enhanced complete port of Muramasa Rebirth.

== Philosophy and influences ==
Vanillaware was born because Kamitani wanted to create original games, with the designs being influenced entirely by the team's tastes. He has strong views on both changing a project's direction halfway through and outsourcing to other companies who might not be as passionate as the main developers. The only outsourcing Vanillaware engages in is its sound design and music, which had been handled since its origins by Basiscape, a company founded by Hitoshi Sakimoto. First meeting during the production of Fantasy Earth, Kamitani and Sakimoto took a liking to each other and became drinking companions, leading the two to frequently collaborate. An important element to Kamitani as cited by Ohnishi is "company branding", with sales based on the reputation and fan demand for its kind of games.

In contrast to the standard staff proportions of video game developers, the majority of Vanillaware's staff are artists. The company originally focused on the entire team making one game, as their attempt at developing two games at once with Kumatanchi met with mixed results. However, by 2013, Kamitani made efforts to divide Vanillaware's staff of 24 into two teams, transitioning into a situation where the teams could work on two different projects at once. The design of Kamitani's games, along with the focus on side-scrolling action, was directly inspired by his work at Capcom, particularly titles such as Dungeons & Dragons: Tower of Doom.

As the industry is dominated by 3D graphics, Kamitani saw that 2D art was "stagnating", and he wanted Vanillaware to be at the cutting edge of 2D art in gaming. The company uses proprietary programming toolsets inspired by Adobe Flash, as well as a graphic development process known as tebineri or "hand-shaping", which allows the artists to create characters and environments that look 3D but are rendered entirely from two-dimensional pixels. The entirely digital tools the team was using by 2008 took a while for Kamitani to get used to. This style goes back to Kamitani's days at Capcom, and was used when designing the art of Princess Crown. Later titles incorporated sophisticated effects such as shadows and effects like sunlight and water movement more commonly associated with 3D rendering. 13 Sentinels: Aegis Rim saw the company completely rethink their level design, seeing the incorporation of depth of field and both 2.5D presentation and incorporating 3D models into the environment. They also needed to redo their cutscene engine, as their original versions were incapable of showing character emotion with the redesigned presentation.

=== Reception and impact ===
The release of Odin Sphere established Vanillaware's gaming reputation, and helped bring 2D art to the attention of mainstream gaming after years of relative obscurity. Odin Sphere also salvaged Kamitani's career in the games industry after the prolonged impact of Princess Crown's failure, allowing him to pursue more projects with Vanillaware. While the company's artwork has been its main appeal, the exaggerated artwork of Dragon's Crown drew criticism from Western journalists, particularly the sexualized Sorceress design.

Odin Sphere directly inspired Beijing-based indie group OTK Games to develop The Vagrant, a 2D hack-and-slash game. The small team described it as a tribute to the games of Vanillaware. Following his departure from Vanillaware, Deguchi founded the independent studio Monochrome Corporation and developed Grand Kingdom. He was inspired by and drew from both Grand Knights History and other Vanillaware titles.
