= Kumatanchi =

2008 video game

- Developers: Vanillaware; Ashinaga Oji-san
- Publisher: Dimple Entertainment
- Director: Takehiro Shiga
- Producer: Nobuhiro Takagaki
- Artist: Takehiro Shiga
- Composers: Kimihiro Abe; Mitsuhiro Kaneda
- Platform: Nintendo DS
- Release: JP: September 25, 2008
- Genre: Life simulation
- Mode: Single-player

Kumatanchi (Japanese: くまたんち; "Kuma-tan Zoo") is a life simulation video game co-developed for the Nintendo DS by Vanillaware and doujin studio Ashinaga Oji-san. It was published on September 25, 2008, by Dimple Entertainment. The premise and gameplay revolves around the player taking care of an anthropomorphic girl based on the mascot character Habanero-tan, seeing her interactions with other anthropomorphic characters over two weeks in real-time. Due to its gameplay and subject matter, it was only released in Japan.

Vanillaware artist Takehiro "Shigatake" Shiga acted as both director and character designer, with the game being an attempt by Vanillaware to produce two projects at the same time. Production was stressful due to staff shortages, putting Shiga off the idea of directing any more games. The music, composed by Kimihiro Abe and Mitsuhiro Kaneda of Basiscape, was meant to break away from the company's traditional sound. Kumatanchi met with low sales and mixed reviews from Japanese and Western journalists.

== Gameplay ==
Kuma-tan in her room, where the player can interact with her

Kumatanchi is a life simulation video game, set in a zoo housing moe anthropomorphic young girls; the player assumes the role of a caretaker at a zoo, tasked with looking after a new arrival, the bear girl Kuma-tan. The interactions with Kuma-tan influence her mood and performance during public shows in the zoo. The game takes place over two weeks in real-time, during which time the player must raise Kuma-tan's standing in the zoo by interacting with her as much as possible. The player interacts with her in her home, which can be outfitted with furniture and activities. At set points in the game, Kuma-tan receives visits from other zoo inhabitants, which further reflect on Kuma-tan's progress.

Kuma-tan's mood and hunger levels are each divided into five stages, and can be maintained by feeding and interacting with her regularly. Players can give positive reinforcement to her by patting her head. Too much patting can cause her to misbehave, and may be balanced with a disciplinary flick to the forehead. Players may interact with other animals in the zoo, allowing Kuma-tan's mood to become better by taking part in conversations and activities, as well as purchase food from the zoo's shop. Accessories are paid for with money earned by selling themed merchandise and pictures of Kuma-tan to zoo visitors, with some pictures yielding higher rewards depending on Kuma-tan's mood. At the end of the two weeks, the player's choices are reflected in Kuma-tan's behavior.

== Development and release ==
Kumatanchi was co-developed by Vanillaware and the doujin studio Ashinaga Oji-san. Takehiro "Shigatake" Shiga, who was a member of both developers, handled both direction and character design. The lead character is based on Habanero-tan, a mascot character of his design. It was produced by Nobuhiro Takagaki from publisher Dimple Entertainment. It was part of an attempt by Vanillaware to develop two games at the same time; Kumatanchi was in production alongside Muramasa: The Demon Blade, but there were little to no staff for Kumatanchi, forcing Shiga to act as both director and art designer. Due to this and the tight production schedule, development was tiring and discouraged Shiga from taking on a directorial role again. It also prompted Vanillaware to abandon parallel game production at the time.

Speaking about the potential broad appeal of Kuma-tan, Shiga commented that while the game was intended to be a family-friendly experience for all ages, he admitted that the character and gameplay was comparable to an adult-oriented edgy style. To research the game's zoo setting, three of the staff members went to Tennōji Zoo, with many of the game's props and activities based on their observations of the animal pens and zoo activities. The game's opening cinematic was inspired by anime openings, with Shiga taking specific cues from the opening of Pani Poni Dash!. The team considered several titles for the game, including one based on an earlier product of Ashinaga Oji-san before settling on Kumatanchi.

The music was composed by Kimihiro Abe and Mitsuhiro Kaneda of Basiscape, a music company founded by Hitoshi Sakimoto which frequently collaborates with Vanillaware. The aim for the music was to break away from Basiscape's traditional musical image, commemorating the company's launch of its self-titled commercial label. The score combined toy drums, melodica, recorder and ukulele to create a homely and comforting sound. The game's opening and ending themes were performed by Ryouki Ruou. The opening theme was intended to convey the energy of an anime opening. A soundtrack album was released on December 16, 2009, by Basiscape and Sweep Records. For the soundtrack version, a different sound source was used, creating an alternate sound from the in-game score. The album later saw a worldwide release on streaming services in June 2025.

The game was announced in June 2008, after Vanillaware earlier hinted that they were working on a game for the Nintendo DS. When the game was revealed, it was 70% complete. It was released on September 25 the same year. A drama CD was published by Dimple Entertainment, first as a promotional item then as a limited commercial release. The game was only released in Japan. In a 2009 interview, Vanillaware director George Kamitani said that the game was denied localization due to its portrayal of training people who resembled small girls.

== Reception ==
Reception

Review score
Publication	Score
Famitsu	23/40

Kumatanchi sold 3,500 copies in its debut week, becoming the 4th highest-selling Nintendo DS game during that period. Japanese gaming magazine Famitsu enjoyed the artwork and basic premise, but one reviewer felt that its real-time gameplay mechanic was intrusive, while another thought the game lacked substance.

Joystiq commented on the game's visual style, which they felt was a departure from previous Vanillaware titles, also calling it "cutesy". Janine Dong of GamerTell was fairly mixed about the game; while she enjoyed the art design and some of its gameplay ideas, she found the general gameplay and interactions with Kuma-tan simplistic and repetitive. Mathias Oertel, during a review of Dragon's Crown for German website 4Players, noted Kumatanchi as having inferior artwork to the rest of the developer's titles.
