= Dimple Entertainment =

Japanese video game developer

- Type: Private
- Industry: Video games
- Founded: November 17, 2005
- Defunct: August 31, 2010
- Successor: Ubisoft
- Headquarters: Chiyoda, Tokyo, Japan
- Key people: Takeshi Kamio (President)
- Products: Games for video game consoles
- Website: "Official Website" (in Japanese). Dimple Entertainment. Archived from the original on 18 March 2009.

Dimple Entertainment (Japanese: 株式会社 ディンプル, Hepburn: Kabushikigaisha Dinpuru) was a Japanese video game developer and publisher founded in November 2005 and headquartered in Chiyoda, Tokyo. They released a number of games beginning with Ayakashibito in August 2006, and would go on to develop and release others for the PlayStation 2, PlayStation Portable, and Nintendo DS. The company worked with other developers such as HuneX, Microvision, and Vanillaware before closing its doors in August 2010.

== Company history ==
Dimple was founded on November 17, 2005 with President Takeshi Kamio serving as head of operations. According to the company's official website, their name came from their desire to "offer entertainment to make unexpected smiles." Their main clients included other video game developers such as Sega, Sony Computer Entertainment, and Nintendo, as well as the Toppan Printing Company. In July 2010, Kamio announced that the company would be closing their doors the following month, with its final day of operation being August 31 of that year.

== Games ==
=== Games developed ===
Title	System	Original release date	Publisher(s)	Ref(s)
Ayakashibito	PlayStation 2	August 31, 2006	Dimple Entertainment	
LoveDrops	PlayStation 2	May 31, 2007	Dimple Entertainment	
Mahoroba Stories	PlayStation 2	July 26, 2007	Dimple Entertainment	
Sankei Sports Kanshuu: Wi-Fi Baken Yosou Ryoku Training: Umania 2007 Nendo-ban	Nintendo DS	November 27, 2007	Dimple Entertainment	
Lup Salad DS: Lupupu Cube	Nintendo DS	January 31, 2008	Dimple Entertainment	
Kaiun Kenkyuuka - Utsukita Mahiro Kanshuu - Mainichi Kokorobics: DS Uranai Happiness 2008	Nintendo DS	January 31, 2008	Dimple Entertainment	
Houkago wa Gin no Shirabe	PlayStation 2	February 28, 2008	Dimple Entertainment	
Mite wa Ikenai	Nintendo DS	August 7, 2008	Dimple Entertainment	
Net Ghost PiPoPa: PiPoPa DS @ Daibouken!!!	Nintendo DS	February 26, 2009	Dimple Entertainment	
Nippon Golfers Kentei DS	Nintendo DS	June 18, 2009	Dimple Entertainment	
Under the Moon: Crescent	PlayStation 2	June 25, 2009	Dimple Entertainment	
Lup Salad Portable Matatabi: Lupupu Cube	PlayStation Portable	January 28, 2010	Dimple Entertainment	
Loveroot Zero: Kiss Kiss * Labyrinth	PlayStation 2	April 28, 2010	Dimple Entertainment	

=== Games published ===
Title	System	Original release date	Developer(s)	JP	KR	EU	AU	Ref(s)	Notes
Kira Kira Pop Princess	Nintendo DS	JP: October 26, 2006; PAL: March 7, 2008; AU: March 13, 2008; KR: July 3, 2008	HuneX	Yes	Yes	Yes	Yes		Published in Europe and Australia by 505 Games and in South Korea by Shinsegae I&C.
Shinri Kenkyuuka Yuuki Yuu Kanshuu: Mainichi Kokorobics DS Therapy	Nintendo DS	May 24, 2007	HuneX	Yes	No	No	No		
Baken DS	Nintendo DS	September 20, 2007	Microvision	Yes	No	No	No		
Eigo o Taberu Fushigi na Ikimono Marsh	Nintendo DS	October 25, 2007	Microvision	Yes	No	No	No		
Pop Town	Nintendo DS	JP: December 20, 2007; PAL: February 27, 2009	HuneX	Yes	No	Yes	No		Published in Europe by 505 Games.
Kumatanchi	Nintendo DS	September 25, 2008	Vanillaware; Ashinaga Oji-San	Yes	No	No	No		
Ayakashibito Portable	PlayStation Portable	March 19, 2009	HuneX	Yes	No	No	No		
