= Pinky:st. =

Japanese line of collectible figurines

Pinky:st. (ピンキーストリート)
- Type: Figure
- Invented by: BABYsue
- Company: Vance Project
- Country: Japan
- Availability: 2003–present
- Materials: Plastic (PET)

Pinky:st., also written Pinky Street (ピンキーストリート, Pinkī Sutorīto), are plastic (PET) figures designed by BABYsue and manufactured by the Japanese company Vance Project. Their distinguishing feature is the interchangeable parts. The heads, hair styles, clothing and accessories can easily be switched between figures according to taste.

The figures are about 10 cm (4 in) tall and compatible with 1:18 scale dollhouses, furniture, vehicles and other accessories. Many special edition Pinky:st. figures have been produced based on characters from Japanese anime, manga and video games.

Beyond the base sets available for purchase, there is an active customization community. Pinky garage kits are also available. Some limited figures are released at Wonder Festival, where unofficial mods and garage kits are also unveiled.

== Figures ==
The various Pinky:st. parts are interchangeable

Eleven original series of Pinky:st. figures have been released between 2003 and 2010. Each series consists of two or three figures with different head and clothes designs, and each figure is assigned a name and code number. For example, the first release was Yoshiko, code number PK001. Series 2 had a set of accessories and two complete figures. A second set of accessories was announced, but its release has been in limbo for over two years. Some series have been reissued as repaint versions with different colored clothes and hair, and in some cases alternate hairstyles.

In addition to the original releases, there are also many Pinky:st. figures designed by BABYsue in collaboration with other Japanese artists. Some of these are based on manga and anime series like Air Gear, Fruits Basket, Gunslinger Girl, Haruhi Suzumiya, Neon Genesis Evangelion, Sakura Wars, Shakugan no Shana, Kobato, and Tenjho Tenge. A number of figures have been based on video games including King of Fighters, Mahoroba Stories, Monster Hunter, Space Invaders, Street Fighter, Tsukihime, and Wild Arms.

Other collaborations include artist and designer Range Murata, Sanrio with My Melody and Kuromi, the PostPet e-mail software and the Japanese fashion brands Mono Comme Ca and Super Lovers. Collaboration with the Choro-Q line of toy cars has resulted in two Pinky-sized Rabbit Scooters and a Messerschmitt car.

== Other media ==
Besides the figures, there have also been releases of accessory stickers and markers for customizing the Pinkies. A few Pinky:st. books were released together with special edition Pinkies. Go! Go! and Acchi Kochi were photo books, while In Town was a book with 3D papercraft backgrounds.

There have also been releases of Pinky:st. manga, a Drama CD called Showtime, an OVA, and two Nintendo DS games; Pinky Street: Kira Kira Music Hour and Pinky Street: Kira Kira Music Night by Dimple Entertainment. The CD, OVA, and DS games all had limited editions packaged with Pinky:st. figures. The two games have been released in Europe and Australia without the Pinky:st. branding under the titles Kira Kira Pop Princess and Pop Town by 505 Games.

In South Korea, Pinky Street: Kira Kira Music Hour was released by Shinsegae I&C.
