= Masahito Yabe =

Japanese voice actor

- Occupations: voice actor, actor
- Years active: 1996–present

Masahito Yabe (矢部 雅史, Yabe Masahito) is a Japanese voice actor affiliated with Office Watanabe.

== Voice roles ==
=== Television animation ===
- Beyblade Burst Chōzetsu (Kyle Hakim)
- Bleach (Zennosuke Kurumadani)
- Brave Command Dagwon (Hido)
- Fruits Basket (2001) (Cousin, First Year Boy Student 1, Disciple, Teacher 2, Male Student, Head Chef, Momiji's Company Secretary, Man 1, Man B)
- Gantz (Jōichirō Nishi)
- Kaitou Joker (DJ Peacock)
- Negima! Magister Negi Magi (Albert Camomile (Kamo-kun))
- Negima!? (Kamo-kun)
- Net Ghost PiPoPa (Pat, Jin Kazama)
- Nurarihyon no Mago (Kappa)
- Samurai Champloo (Tomonoshin Shibui)
- Sket Dance (Hōsuke)
- Ushio to Tora (Kyōma)
- Yo-kai Watch (Wiglin, Happierre)
- Yo-kai Watch Shadowside (Charlie, Atshushi Kamamoto, Blazion, Wakume-Kun)

=== Tokusatsu ===
- Ressha Sentai ToQger (Wig Shadow)
