= 13 Sentinels: Aegis Rim =

2019 video game

- Developer: Vanillaware
- Publishers: JP: Atlus; WW: Sega
- Director: George Kamitani
- Producer: Akiyasu Yamamoto
- Designer: Kouichi Maenou
- Programmer: Kentaro Ohnishi
- Artists: Yukiko Hirai; Emika Kida
- Writer: George Kamitani
- Composers: Hitoshi Sakimoto: Yukinori Kikuchi; Mitsuhiro Kaneda; Yoshimi Kudo; Rikako Watanabe; Kazuki Higashihara; Azusa Chiba
- Platforms: PlayStation 4 Nintendo Switch
- Release: PlayStation 4: JP: November 28, 2019; WW: September 22, 2020; Nintendo Switch: WW: April 12, 2022; JP: April 14, 2022
- Genres: Adventure, real-time strategy
- Mode: Single-player

13 Sentinels: Aegis Rim (Note: Jūsan kihei bōeiken (Japanese: 十三機兵防衛圏; lit. 13 Machine Soldier Defence Zone)) is a 2019 video game developed by Vanillaware and published by Atlus. It was released for the PlayStation 4 in Japan in November 2019 and worldwide in September 2020, with a Nintendo Switch version released in April 2022. The game is divided between side-scrolling adventure segments and real-time strategy (RTS) battles, and follows thirteen high school students in a fictionalized 1980s Japan who are dragged into a futuristic war between mechas and hostile Kaiju in a nonlinear narrative.

Director and writer George Kamitani conceived the game in 2013 following the completion of Dragon's Crown, originally pitching it for a toy line. 13 Sentinels began production two years later, discarding the toy line element under Atlus. The production proved challenging for Vanillaware, as the studio dealt with workload and development challenges. Contrary to previous works, Kamitani both worked on the script alone and handed character design duties to Yukiko Hirai and Emika Kida. Hitoshi Sakimoto and his studio Basiscape, who handled the music for Vanillaware's past games, revisited their roles.

Originally scheduled for a 2018 release on both the PlayStation 4 and PlayStation Vita, the game was delayed to 2019 with the Vita version being canceled. The English localization by Atlus West proved challenging due to the COVID-19 pandemic. It saw a slow start in sales upon its release in Japan before eventually exceeding Atlus's expectations, with shipments and digital sales reaching one million units by 2023. Critical reception has been generally positive, with praise going to its narrative and art design, though several reviewers faulted the RTS segments as the weakest part of the game.

== Gameplay ==
13 Sentinels: Aegis Rim divides its gameplay between adventure game sections (above), and real-time strategy battles (below).

13 Sentinels: Aegis Rim is a video game where players take control of thirteen different characters, who interact with each other to build a larger narrative. The gameplay is split into three sections. They are Remembrance, with exploration and dialogue taking priority and advancing the narrative; Destruction, where characters equip mecha and engage in battles against enemies called Kaiju; and Analysis, a glossary which documents event scenes and important items and characters.

During the adventure game-style Remembrance segments, the player explores two-dimensional (2D) side-scrolling environments, interacting with elements of those environments in a non-linear manner. Several elements move in real-time regardless of the player's actions, and choices can be made which alter the outcome of some scenes. Keywords spoken by characters and obtained items are added to a Thought Cloud database, which can be accessed to trigger both internal monologues and initiate new dialogue. Once learned, keywords are carried over into other earlier or parallel scenes, which in turn unlock further story routes and options. The character stories are tracked with a flowchart, with players able to jump between scenes to try different keywords from the Thought Cloud. If a wrong choice is made during one section, the game rewinds back to the beginning of the day so players can select the right choice. To reach that point faster, events the player has already seen can be fast forwarded.

The battle system of the Destruction mode takes the form of a real-time strategy scenario, with up to six chosen characters using Sentinels to fight off waves of Kaiju defending a terminal. The terminal's health is determined by which units are in place, and if all units are defeated, the hub is overwhelmed and the game ends. Gameplay can be paused, allowing for Sentinels to be moved and actions such as combat and support abilities to be carried out. The section is completed when the hub is successfully defended against all waves. Battles pit Sentinels against Kaiju with differing strengths and abilities such as flight or extra defense, requiring one of the four Sentinel types; some Sentinels are strong against flying enemies, while others do better against large ground-based forces. They also have different attack ranges and movement speeds. Sentinels have at least one basic attack that costs nothing, and additional abilities that cost a resource called EP; EP can be recovered by defending. After acting, each Sentinel has a cooldown timer before it can act again. Damage can be repaired by Sentinel pilots, but this requires leaving the Sentinel and leaving them vulnerable to attack. The player can also trigger limited-use "Terminal Commands", special field-wide abilities such as an EMP which use up a dedicated energy gauge. Characters level up with experience points and gain passive bonus effects, while Sentinel abilities and attributes can be raised using Meta-chips gained during battles.

Analysis takes the form of an index where event scenes and information on people, items and concepts are archived. Mystery Points, earned through Destruction mode, are used to unlock new index entries in Analysis. As the player advances, character narratives are locked off until something else has taken place in another section of the game. These unlock conditions can include unlocking entries in Analysis, advancing stories in Remembrance, or tackling particular battles in Destruction.

== Synopsis ==
=== Setting and characters ===
13 Sentinels is primarily set during a fictionalized version of 1985 in the Shōwa period, but also jumps between 1945 during the later years of World War II, 2025, 2065, and the distant future of 2105. The story follows the perspective of thirteen characters. While several characters are native to the 1980s period, several come from either the future or the era of World War II. The storyline is split between these characters, and by following each the player aims to avert a disastrous future for mankind. A recurring location is Sakura High School, which multiple characters attend across different time periods. The story is told using nonlinear narrative, switching both between different protagonists and the events of the final battle against an army of Kaiju, otherwise known as the "Deimos", giant monsters who arrive in 1985 and attack Japan. Each of the thirteen protagonist's arcs culminate in summoning a Sentinel, a mecha designed to fight the Deimos which also has the ability to travel between different eras.

The thirteen protagonists are Juro Kurabe, an otaku who is troubled by strange dreams; Iori Fuyusaka, an outgoing student who likewise has dreams similar to Juro; Ei Sekigahara, an amnesiac young man pursued by a mysterious organization; Keitaro Miura, a young man from World War II-era Japan; Takatoshi Hijiyama, Miura's upperclassman from the same time period; Nenji Ogata, a good-hearted delinquent; Natsuno Minami, a track team member fascinated by the occult and UFOs; Yuki Takamiya, a notorious sukeban (delinquent girl) and childhood friend of Natsuno; Shu Amiguchi, a playboy with a kind heart who discusses his dreams with Juro and Iori; Tomi Kisaragi, a girl from 2025 sent to 1985; Megumi Yakushiji, another girl from 2025 who is in love with Juro; Ryoko Shinonome, a sickly girl from 2065 tasked with pursuing an escaped prisoner dubbed "426"; and Renya Gouto, a stern young man from 2065 who ultimately leads the Sentinel pilots.

There are several notable supporting characters. Chihiro Morimura is both the school nurse and the teacher for Kurabe and Fuyusaka's class. Tsukasa Okino is a genius student with deep knowledge of the Sentinels, who frequently cross-dresses as a girl. Chihiro is a mysterious girl who Miura considers his sister but who later accompanies Gouto during several sections. Kyuta Shiba is one of Juro's best friends, but possesses a hidden agenda. Erika Aiba is a student who tags along with Takamiya as they solve mysteries surrounding the Sentinels. Tamao Kurabe is a woman from the 1940s who closely resembles Aiba. Tetsuya Ida, while ostensibly a part-time instructor, is the chairman of the covert Special Investigations Unit (SIU) in 1985. The small robot BJ accompanies Natsuno on her journeys through time. Fluffy, a talking cat, strikes a deal with Megumi to save Juro. Miyuki Inaba is a famous idol within the 1980s period.

=== Plot ===
In 1985 Japan, Kurabe, Fuyusaka, and Amiguchi experience shared dreams, either of themselves fighting previous wars against the Kaiju or of what appear to be older versions of themselves in the future. They are later seen by Morimura, who Kurabe learns is administering an unknown medication to some students; Kurabe is referred to in Morimura's notes as "Juro Izumi", an identity he cannot remember. Takamiya is blackmailed by SIU member Ida into monitoring students at Sakura High School. Takamiya's friend Minami finds a robot called BJ; assumed to be an alien, BJ is an AI robot from 2105 searching for its Sentinel. Yakushiji, from 2025, is approached by Fluffy, who says he can bring back "Izumi" if she shoots select people with a special gun. Gouto and Shinonome both work for the SIU, recruiting Kisaragi from 2025 after the Deimos attack her time period. At a later point, an amnesiac Sekigahara wakes up next to the murdered Morimura, ending up pursued by SIU operatives. In 1945; Miura and his little sister Chihiro live with Tamao Kurabe, and are friends with Hijiyama and newcomer "Kiriko Douji", later revealed to be the cross-dressing Okino. Shortly after Okino takes Hijiyama to 1985, the Deimos attack 1945. Tamao vanishes upon being "killed", Gouto kidnaps Chihiro, and Miura accidentally travels to 1985 using a Sentinel. Each playable character has dedicated intertwining story arcs, revealing more about individual pieces of the plot.

It is gradually revealed that rather than time periods, the protagonists inhabit five different areas, or "Sectors", which replicate a specific era. In the real-world 2188, a nanomachine virus ravaged the Earth, leaving only fifteen survivors in a space colony; the thirteen protagonists, as well as Okino and Tamao. The survivors initiated Project Ark, sending their DNA and records of their history to a new planet where they would restart humanity. The events of the game are happening in the far future on a distant terraformed planet and the simulation housing and training their minds is otherwise populated by human-like AIs. Project Ark and its population are managed by Universal Control, an AI which erases inconsistencies and falsifies information to preserve the simulation. The 2188 Shinonome, disillusioned with humanity, secretly implemented the Deimos Code; this would cause Shikishima, a mega-corporation that exists in all Sectors, to produce the Deimos. Once the Deimos invades all five Sectors, the simulation resets to sixteen years prior to protect Universal Control, with the fifteen humans losing their memories of the events, trapping them in an endless loop. Some characters survive loops with their memories intact using "Sector 0", a non-spatial area at the system's core.

Some key plot threads are scattered through each character's narrative. Ida, an earlier version of Amiguchi, seeks to perpetuate the loops in an attempt to restore an earlier version of his lover Kisaragi, who exists in the current world as Inaba. He loses hope and is killed after learning that Sector 0 will be erased in the next reset. Juro Izumi, the original version of Kurabe, uses extreme measures to change events and is dubbed Prisoner 426, going on to use the avatars of Aiba, Fluffy and Shiba to further his plans and ending up directly aiding the thirteen pilots. The current Morimura—a former associate and lover of Izumi—is determined to trigger Operation Aegis, which will cut off Universal Control from the Deimos while trapping them in the ruined simulation. She is killed by the preserved personality of the original Chihiro Morimura, who exists in the avatar of Miura's sister. Initially pessimistic of their chances, she is persuaded by Gouto to aid them. Fuyusaka is revealed to be another avatar of Morimura. Minami, Takamiya, Kisaragi, Ogata and Miura cross paths repeatedly and end up discovering several aspects of the backstory through travels to different sectors. In Hijiyama's route, it is revealed that the originals in the space colony eventually descended into violence over resource disputes.

Each arc concludes with the protagonist joining the final battle. When the Deimos arrive, the 13 pilots band together to fight them, with remote assistance from Inaba and Chihiro. The pilots fend the Deimos off long enough for Inaba to contact Universal Control and shut down the simulation, allowing the pilots, together with Okino and Tamao, to awaken from their hibernation pods in the real world. Five years later, the pilots have formed families with their loved ones on the new planet. They restore the simulation and all its inhabitants, and plan to use the pods to create bodies for the AI humans so they can all live in the real world. Inaba and Ida plan to live in Universal Control, while Izumi and Morimura are reunited in the simulation. A secret cutscene shows self-replicating machines sent into space by Project Ark have colonized at least one other planet, where the game's events are repeating with some differences.

== Development ==
13 Sentinels was developed by Vanillaware, a Japanese game developer who also worked on Odin Sphere, Dragon's Crown and Muramasa: The Demon Blade, notable for their usage of 2D art in an industry predominated by the usage of 3D graphics. Vanillaware founder George Kamitani, who also directed Odin Sphere and Dragon's Crown, returned to serve as director for the game while handing the character design duties to Yukiko Hirai and Emika Kida. The game was produced by Akiyasu Yamamoto of Atlus, a role he had fulfilled for Odin Sphere. It was the team's first game to use a contemporary or science fiction setting, as all their previous projects had used high fantasy settings. The concept originated in 2013 following the completion of Dragon's Crown. Tired of spending so long in fantasy worlds, Kamitani wanted to create a science-fiction story set in the time of his youth in the 1980s. He also wanted something on a much smaller scale, as Dragon's Crown was a huge project for him.

The game was originally pitched to an unnamed media company on the basis that it would be used as a basis for a toyline, with the marketing focused exclusively on Japan and having a small budget and low sales margins. As part of the initial pitch, Kamitani created mechas with hulking designs inspired by Robot Jox, then created a "gap in expectations" by having a setting and characters inspired by shōjo manga. He was about to push forward with the project in this form when he remembered Atlus had been given right of first refusal as part of their contract to fund Dragon's Crown. Frustrated with the other company's demands and uncertain that Atlus would approve of the concept, Kamitani nevertheless showed it to them. Atlus, who was searching for a game to market internationally, immediately accepted it without the need to incorporate the toy line marketing. Despite these changes, the overall story concept remained intact and the final scene was unchanged from the original draft.

Full production began in the summer of 2015 following the completion of remakes of Muramasa (Muramasa Rebirth) and Odin Sphere (Odin Sphere Leifthrasir). The entire production period, including early concept work, lasted six years. The game was originally in production for PlayStation 4 (PS4) and PlayStation Vita (Vita). At the time of its announcement, the game had only just entered full development and there were very few assets to show. The game was originally scheduled for release in 2018, but in November of that year Atlus delayed the game and cancelled the Vita version due to the longer time needed for development. In response to this, so players would experience what to expect from the game's characters and narrative, a demo-type release called 13 Sentinels: Aegis Rim Prologue was developed. Based on feedback from Prologue, the development team were able to make adjustments and additions to the main game. Kamitani described the game as "truly, recklessly ambitious". He referred to the project as the culmination of his work and skills up to that point.

=== Scenario ===
The concept for a story featuring multiple protagonists was drawn from the long-running television series Chūgakusei Nikki. Kamitani's original concept had seven or eight characters, but as the first artwork for the concept was published in 2013, he decided to increase the number to thirteen; this exponentially increased the company's workload. Prior to incorporating mechas, the story revolved around young people with superpowers inspired by the TV drama series Night Head. Due to lacking excitement and overt science fiction elements, he rewrote the premise. Kamitani based the narrative on the original video animation Megazone 23. He was originally planning to use the Jules Verne novel Two Years' Vacation as inspiration. In the final product, the characters Gouto and Yakushiji are based respectively on the novel's characters Gordon and Cross. The narrative structure also drew inspiration from Western thriller fiction. In contrast to his work on Odin Sphere, where he had created the overall story while other writers worked on the game scenario, Kamitani wrote the entire scenario of the game himself both in and out of office hours over the course of three years. Kamitani chose to set the game in 1980s Japan due to his own experience; his knowledge of the modern Japanese school system was limited, and the lack of mobile phones in that era allowed for more face-to-face conversations between characters in-game.

The original scenario timeline ran from the 1940s to the 1980s, but when Atlus took over the project Kamitani expanded the scope into the near and distant future. Kamitani wanted to create a mecha-themed story for a modern audience, as many of the most memorable genre works (Mobile Suit Gundam, Neon Genesis Evangelion) were by that time several decades old. At one point, each of the thirteen protagonists had twelve possible story paths, making for a total of 165 possible variations. Due to the production timeline and the need to reveal the story mysteries, Kamitani had to cut a lot of planned optional comedic and bonding scenes between characters. Several of the surviving routes went through extensive revisions, with some planned scenes such as a coffee shop location being cut, but a key surviving theme that came with its shōjo manga inspiration was romance.

Each protagonist's storyline drew inspiration from a particular outside source, ranging from Japanese anime and manga to Western movies and classic works of science fiction. Sekigahara's route originally had a shōjo-style romantic choice between Fuyusaka and Shinonome, but this was changed to make Fuyusaka the only choice. One of the core mysteries were the characters of Fuyusaka, Morimura and Chihiro, who were different incarnations of the same character, with her designs and portrayal showing the alternating charms of different ages. This section of the plot, which was a key part of Gouto's scenario, underwent major revisions late in production. Okino, created by Kamitani on Hirai's request for a "unique" character, was based on a soft-spoken character from Tottemo Hijikata-kun, a 1980s manga series. The complex relationship between Hijiyama and Okino, which used both comedic and romantic elements, was inspired by the manga series Stop!! Hibari-kun!. Kamitani cited several storylines as technically difficult to write, such as Takamiya's detective-themed narrative, Shinonome's amnesia plotline and Ogata's train sequences. Amiguchi's story was the most straightforward and thus easiest to complete, while the dark tone of Yakushiji's narrative often left him depressed.

=== Art and game design ===
Kamitani, who handled character designs himself in previous games, handed duties to Hirai and Kida due to the writing workload. In the same way, he originally wanted to handle the mecha and kaiju designs, but only created a few drafts before handing over their designs to other staff members. The character design was influenced by the work of mangaka Akira Kagami, a favorite of Kamitani in his youth. Hirai was given the stylistic direction of "girls and robots" for the character designs. Unlike past Vanillaware games like Odin Sphere and Muramasa, which repeatedly used the same 2D background environments for their event scenes, the team created different backgrounds for several event scenes in the game and experimented with using some 3D assets for additional layering in these scenes, increasing development time. The added depth also created problems for the team with conveying emotions during cutscenes. During production, the character designs of Shinonome and Yakushiji were switched to better fit their emerging story personalities.

The team's aim was to push the boundaries they had previously established for 2D artwork in video games. In contrast to the fantasy landscapes of earlier Vanillaware titles, 13 Sentinels: Aegis Rim was set in drabber modern environments featuring concrete and metal. To ensure a similar vibrancy to their earlier projects, the team leveraged the lighting effects to create an equivalent atmospheric effect. As with previous titles, during adventure segments the camera was fixed to mimic the experience of watching a stage play. To achieve a suitable depth of field, Vanillaware "[placed] objects within a layered three-dimensional space" and adjusted the lighting to create the illusion of distance. The battle level designs were directly based on the graphic design of Gunparade March and Fantavision, with the blue-hued character portraits being based on the monitor displays and lighting of Alien.

The gameplay concepts drew from Vanillaware's earlier game GrimGrimoire, with the balance of adventure and battle sections in 13 Sentinels being based on GrimGrimoire's original pitch. The adventure sections were designed to feel like the gameplay of Shenmue, expressing the classic style of adventure games with a more intuitive interface design and response, for which the Cloud system was designed. Though Kamitani thought the Cloud system would be simple, its implementation proved extra challenging. An original plan for a strict time limit was scrapped after negative feedback from staff. As the StarCraft-based battles of GrimGrimoire had met with a mixed response in Japan, Kamitani combined it with elements of the tower defense genre popular in the region. These elements were mostly handled by the programming team, led by Kentaro Ohnishi. The Archive was suggested by staff member Kouichi Maenou as a means for players to explore the game's mysteries. This aspect was handled by other staff, as Kamitani was in the middle of scenario writing. He reminisced that due to the various development challenges and his own workload, he felt like an absentee compared to the other staff as there was comparatively little interaction during development. The increased workload, scope, and challenges for the game's development led to significant changes in the studio's usual development cycle.

=== Audio ===
==== Music ====
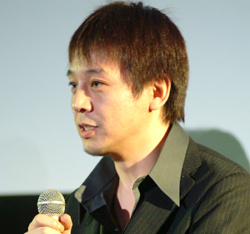
Hitoshi Sakimoto led the music team that worked on 13 Sentinels: Aegis Rim, composing several tracks including the main theme.

The music and sound design for the game were handled by Basiscape, a music company led by Hitoshi Sakimoto who had collaborated on other Vanillaware projects. The music was composed and arranged by a team led by Sakimoto, and included Yukinori Kikuchi, Mitsuhiro Kaneda, Yoshimi Kudo, Rikako Watanabe, Kazuki Higashihara and Azusa Chiba. All other aspects of the game's sound design were handled by Masaaki Kaneko.

Sakimoto was contacted by Kamitani at the beginning of development when the New Year image was designed. The first track composed was the opening theme "Brat Overflow", which featured in the reveal trailer and would inform the game's musical style from that point on. He wrote the theme as a "lean motif" that could be incorporated into multiple tracks. The game featured a vocal theme, "Seaside Vacation", performed by singer Hu Ito who was the singing voice for in-game idol Miyuki Inaba. The song was written by Sakimoto. In keeping with the main setting, the song's style was based on Showa-era pop songs, though there were no particular inspirations behind the song and singer. The lyrics were written by Watanabe.

The musical style of the game was driven mostly by Basiscape based on the game's premise. Compared to his earlier work with Vanillaware, Sakimoto worked more on keeping a unified musical image. The music was themed around techno, but the team worked to keep melodic balance in the score. Its theme was "juvenile", with Sakimoto needing to redo his early work with Kamitani's help. Though Kikuchi and Watanabe were new to Vanillaware titles, both Kudo and Kaneda had worked with the studio on Odin Sphere and Muramasa. Kudo, Kaneda and Kikuchi handled the battle tracks based on Sakimoto's direction for tracks which changed based on the player's progress through the stage. A recurring need for the score was to balance electronic and orchestral elements throughout the score. The two gameplay modes had different musical styles; the adventure sections used "analog" sounds and a focus on atmosphere, while battles made heavy use of electronic elements and rhythm. Some of the earlier tracks overtly used Showa-style composition, but as the setting was already heavily based around the Showa period, the music shifted to be less period-specific. Another difference compared to earlier Vanillaware projects was that more of the tracks were designed with a specific story-based theme, such as shopping in the high street. Due to the changes made to the game, the themes consequently needed a lot of adjustment during production. The placement of some songs within particular scenes, such as a sombre piece accompanying a comedic moment, were done by Kaneko based on his interpretation of a scene.

A soundtrack album was released on February 27, 2020, the physical version being exclusive to Atlus's online store. The album features four discs, and has a cover art drawn by Hirai. The album also released digitally worldwide through iTunes. The album included the full version of "Seaside Vacation", and versions of the battle tracks which ran through all their variations before segueing into the victory theme. A mini soundtrack featuring ten tracks from the game was packaged with the special edition of 13 Sentinels: Aegis Rim Prologue. An arrange album, featuring two new tracks and a new cover design by Hirai, was released on February 27, 2021. It was also released as a worldwide digital release on iTunes. The album was described by Kudo as "a musical expression of another aspect" of the game. A further album featuring tracks from a 2023 orchestral concert was released in Japan on May 10, 2024. All three albums were released worldwide on streaming services in June 2025.

==== Voice acting ====
Voice recording for the script ran concurrently with the scriptwriting and revision process, with six different recording sessions for various actors happening during production. Voice recording ran on until very close to the game's retail release. Several of the actors were fans of Vanillaware's titles, and enjoyed voicing the characters. Due to the plot point surrounding Fuyusaka, Morimura and Chihiro, all three shared the same voice actress: Atsumi Tanezaki. As scenes were recorded out of story order, the recording team needed a dedicated worksheet showing which scene called for what emotion so the actors would not make any serious mistakes with characterizations. Kaneko had a difficult task balancing out the music and dialogue in different scenes, made more complicated by the scenario's complex structure. Full voice acting, including the Thought Cloud dialogue sections, was a later addition chosen to promote player immersion. Due to this task, Kaneko had to carefully sync voice clips with keywords from the Thought Cloud so that it would not sound like random noise, along with filtering the music and environmental effects so the voice work came through clearly.

== Release ==
13 Sentinels was announced at the 2015 Tokyo Game Show. Prior to the announcement, the game was teased in a preview video in July as a collaboration project between Atlus and Vanillaware following the public reveal of Odin Sphere: Leifthrasir. The delay and cancellation of the Vita version occurred in November 2018. 13 Sentinels: Aegis Rim Prologue was released in Japan on March 14, 2019. It came in both a standalone edition and a special edition which included artwork and a mini soundtrack. Prologue also featured a short teaser for the company's next project, later called Unicorn Overlord. A demo that allows players to access the first three hours of the game was released in Japan on October 30. The game was released in Japan on November 28, 2019. An Asian release for Hong Kong, Taiwan, South Korea, and Southeast Asia was published by Sega on March 19, 2020. A manga anthology based on the game, featuring stories from each character's perspective, was released on September 10, 2020.

13 Sentinels was originally set to be released outside of Japan on September 8, 2020, before being delayed until September 22. Pre-orders included an artbook, with limited quantities for the game's physical edition. The localization was led by Atlus West's Allie Doyon. She commented that the project's voice director had a difficult time explaining the complicated storyline to the actors, saying she lost count of the number of times they used the phrase "wibbly-wobbly, timey-wimey" to explain it. As there was no lead protagonist, each actor only got their own side of the narrative and the team had to integrate the recordings with this separation in mind. The complexity of the plot, the continual adjustments to voicework in the Japanese version, and the way dialogue was delivered in small pieces during scenes rather than in a dedicated dialogue box all presented challenges for the localization. For the European localization co-managed by Sega's regional branch, the team used the Japanese script rather than the English one for translations into French, German, Italian and Spanish. The game was published in the region by Sega.

The team were beginning English dub recording when the COVID-19 pandemic disrupted their schedule. The only actor to finish recording before the pandemic forced Atlus West to close their sound studios was Kaiji Tang, who voiced Hijiyama. The studio heads, voice actors and localizers collaborated on a solution, with the actors doing the rest of their recording using conference call software within makeshift sound studio environments set up within their homes. Due to the makeshift recording conditions, the sound editing department at Atlus West had a greater workload cleaning up recordings to ensure uniform sound quality. Shorter recording sessions, together with connection problems that occurred from time to time and the toll of isolation on both actors and sound staff, also proved difficult. The voice acting took a collaborative effort between Atlus, Sega, Vanillaware and Basiscape. Doyon referred to 13 Sentinels as one of her favorite video game project up to that point in her career. A Nintendo Switch version was released on April 12, 2022, in the West and two days later in Japan. An August patch added the Switch port additions and updates to the PS4 version. The Japanese release was also patched to include the English dub.

== Reception ==
Reception

Aggregate scores
Aggregator	Score
Metacritic	PS4: 85/100; NS: 88/100
OpenCritic	97% recommend

Review scores
Publication	Score
Destructoid	8.5/10
Easy Allies	9.0/10
Electronic Gaming Monthly	4/5
Eurogamer	Essential
Famitsu	9/10, 9/10, 10/10, 10/10
Game Informer	8/10
GameRevolution	9/10
GameSpot	9/10
Hardcore Gamer	4/5
IGN	8/10
Nintendo Life	9/10
Nintendo World Report	8.5/10
Push Square	9/10
RPGamer	4.5/5
RPGFan	92/100
USgamer	4/5
RPG Site	10/10

13 Sentinels: Aegis Rim received "generally favorable" reviews according to review aggregator website Metacritic. Fellow review aggregator OpenCritic assessed that the game received "mighty" approval, being recommended by 97% of critics. The narrative and characters were universally praised for their complexity and compelling nature, though a few found it difficult to follow or overly reliant on jargon, or cited uneven character writing and occasional pacing issues. The gameplay was met with generally positive comments, though the RTS sections were seen as the weaker part of the experience. The visuals were also met with general praise, though the battle displays were faulted compared to the adventure segments. The music was also met with praise, while the localization saw positive responses from Western reviewers.

Japanese magazine Famitsu lauded the game's presentation and narrative, with two of the four reviewers giving it a perfect score. Destructoid's CJ Andriessen lauded the game as intriguing, feeling that only the RTS battle sections held the game back from being Vanillaware's best game to date. Malindy Hetfeld of Eurogamer compared the attention to detail in its worldbuilding to the work of Hideo Kojima and generally enjoyed the game although she faulted the lack of central plot and portrayal of both straight and LGBT romance. Joe Juba, writing for Game Informer, praised the narrative delivery and art style of the adventure sections despite finding the RTS sections weaker in both gameplay and presentation. Heidi Kemps of GameSpot called it an unforgettable experience and "a unique, genre-mixing experiment", lauding its narrative and art style while again faulting the RTS gameplay as weaker overall.

IGN's Matt Kim called the RTS gameplay style "commendable", but cited the storytelling and adventure art style as the main reasons for buying the game. Robert Ramsey of Push Square gave the title a near-perfect score, lauding the experience overall despite pacing issues with the narrative. Alex Fuller, writing for RPGamer, enjoyed the game's combat and felt that the narrative, while enjoyable, was not interactive enough and took up too much of the gameplay. Alana Hagues of RPGFan—referencing a 2009 interview with Kamitani on his ideal game—felt that Kamitani and Vanillaware had "have achieved their ultimate goal", lauding the overall game design and strength of narrative. Josh Torres of RPG Site gave the game a perfect score, lauding it as a new landmark in video game storytelling and praising the overall package despite its RTS elements appearing weaker.

In an update to the original review, Kemps noted that very little was graphically lost in the transition from the PlayStation 4 version to the Nintendo Switch version, calling the port "superb". Mitch Vogel of Nintendo Life, while finding the combat repetitive and some of the story delivery confusing, generally lauded the game as enjoyable and strongly recommended it for genres fans and players of visual novels. RPGFan's Cory Tischbein, while echoing general praise of the narrative and graphics while noting the weaker combat system, said the game stood as one of the strongest gaming experiences on the Switch. Nathan Lee of RPG Site gave the game a perfect score, citing it as a great port and praising it as being additionally pretty to look at on the Switch's OLED model.

=== Sales and accolades ===
In Japan, during its opening week, all retail versions of the game sold just over 34,200 units, debuting in fifth place in the charts. These low sales were blamed by Kamitani on the game's blend of genres, difficult production, and releasing alongside other popular titles. While initial sales were low, positive word of mouth from both players and other industry figures caused sales to increase, resulting in stock shortages. It remained in the top 30 best-selling titles into January, with total physical sales of over 59,000 units on PS4. By this point, physical and digital sales had reached 100,000 units. In their fiscal report, Atlus said that 13 Sentinels: Aegis Rim exceeded their sales expectations. Following its worldwide release, the game had sold over 300,000 copies by January 2021. By August 2023, physical shipments and digital sales reached one million copies.

The game won the awards for "Best Scenario" and "Best Adventure Game" at the Famitsu/Dengeki Game Awards 2019, and it was nominated for "Game of the Year", "Best Graphics", and "Best Rookie Game". It received a nomination in the "Media" category for the 51st annual Seiun Awards in 2020, the only video game nominee that year. The game was also nominated for "Best Narrative" at The Game Awards 2020. In IGN's "Best of 2020", 13 Sentinels: Aegis Rim was one of the nominees in their "Best Adventure/Puzzle" and "Best Video Game Art Design" categories. During the 24th Annual D.I.C.E. Awards, the Academy of Interactive Arts & Sciences nominated 13 Sentinels: Aegis Rim for "Outstanding Achievement in Story".
