= Chocobi =

Snack food from Crayon Shin-chan

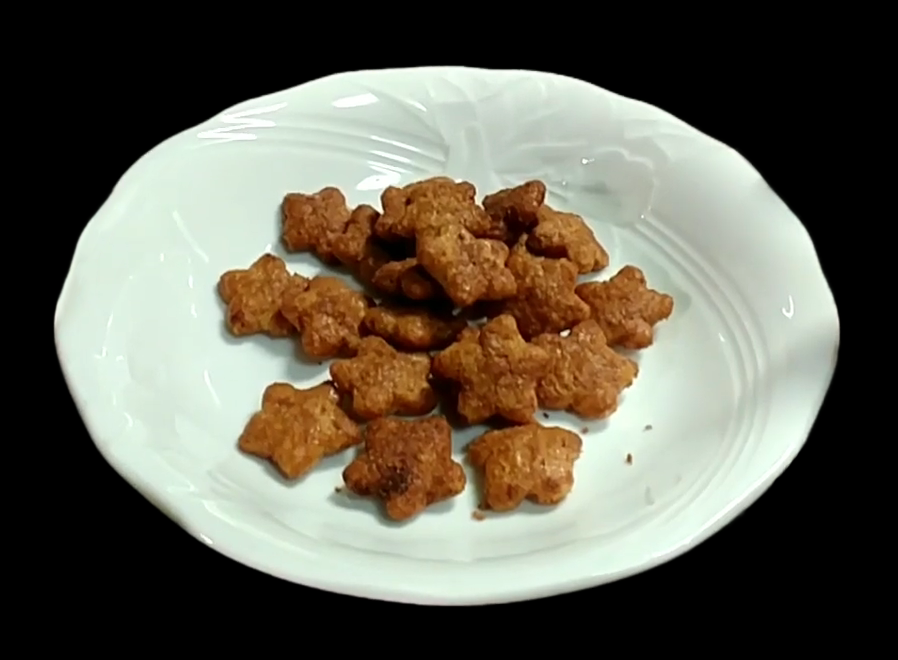
- A bowl of chocolate-flavored Chocobi
- Produced by: (Japan) Tohato (Hong Kong) Four Seas (Thailand) Bandai Namco
- Country: Japan
- Introduced: March 2006
- Markets: Japan; Hong Kong; China
- Website: www.bandai.co.jp/candy/chocobi/

Chocobi (Japanese: チョコビ, romanized: Chokobi (Note: It is a portmanteau of "チョコレート" (Chocolate) and "ビスケット" (Biscuit).)) is a biscuit confectionery that appears in Crayon Shin-chan, and the prototype is Koala's March. The outer packaging is a green hexagonal prism with the katakana "チョコビ" and the magenta crocodile character "Waniyama-san" (ワニ山さん).

== Origin ==
Chocobi first appeared in the animated version of the episode "Going to the Dentist" (歯医者に行くゾ), which aired on April 27, 1992, (Note: Episode 3, Part 3, Episode 9 in total.) which was adapted from the first volume of the manga "Crayon Shin-chan". In the original book, the snack Misae Nohara fed Shinnosuke is Koala's March; in the animation due to trademark, the Koala's March was changed to a fictional snack "Chocobi".

== History ==
On May 26, 1993, Lotte first launched the original flavor Chocobi and the royal Chocobi (almond flavor) in Hokkaido and Tohoku region, and on July 12 of the same year, it was launched nationwide in Japan. "Chocobi" is a peanut chocolate exclusively developed by Lotte and the popular "Crayon Shin-chan" at the time. Although it was a completely different product from the Chocobi in the anime, it became the number one chocolate snack in the market, surpassing Meiji Seika's "きのこの山" and "たけのこの里", and was released with a sales denomination of 2 billion yen in the first half of the year. It is now no longer available for sale.

In addition, Orion also released star-shaped ramune confectionery similar to those from the anime, while Bandai initially released stick-shaped biscuits.

In March 2006, as a cooperative product with Tohato, the second-generation Chocobi was launched; As a puffcorn, it faithfully reproduces the packaging and shape of the original snack. As of the beginning of 2020, cumulative shipments have exceeded 200 million.

From 2014 to 2017, Morinaga Milk Industry collaborated with the film to launch a limited ice cream mochi called "ChocobiIce" (チョコビアイス).

In addition to Japan, Chocobi is also officially sold in Hong Kong and Mainland China.
