= Soul Nomad & the World Eaters =

2007 video game

- Developer: Nippon Ichi Software
- Publishers: JP: Nippon Ichi Software; NA: NIS America; EU: Koei
- Composer: Tenpei Sato
- Platforms: PlayStation 2, PlayStation Network, Microsoft Windows, Nintendo Switch
- Release: February 15, 2007: PlayStation 2; JP: February 15, 2007; NA: September 25, 2007; AU: June 26, 2008; EU: June 27, 2008 PlayStation Network; JP: December 17, 2014 Windows; WW: August 31, 2021 Nintendo Switch; JP: August 26, 2021; NA: August 31, 2021; EU: September 3, 2021
- Genre: Tactical role-playing
- Mode: Single-player

Soul Nomad & the World Eaters (Note: Known in Japan as Soul Cradle: World Eaters (Japanese: ソウルクレイドル 世界を喰らう者, Hepburn: Sōru Kureidoru: Sekai o Kurau Mono).) is a strategy role-playing game (SRPG), developed and published by Nippon Ichi Software. The game was initially released for PlayStation 2 on February 15, 2007 in Japan, September 25 in North America, and June 26 and 27, 2008 in Australia and Europe, respectively. It was later ported to Steam and Nintendo Switch as part of the Prinny Presents NIS Classics Volume 1 compilation and released worldwide in August of 2021.

The game centres around the adventures of Revya, the gender-selectable silent protagonist, to defeat several sentient magical weapons, called the World Eaters, that were once commanded centuries earlier by Gig, the godlike "Master of Death". Gig, now sealed forcibly within Revya, is begrudgingly forced to lend them his power, although he attempts to tempt Revya down the path of evil. Critics positively received the game's story for its originality, but it was criticized for its lack of gameplay depth compared to other Nippon Ichi titles.

== Gameplay ==
A key element of the game is customization, as, like the majority of Nippon Ichi Software's games, the game is a strategy role-playing game, giving the player many options to choose from when progressing through the story. When the game begins, the player chooses the gender and name of the main character, a change from other Nippon Ichi games.

At the beginning of the game, the main character can become powerful enough to destroy even the final boss. However, relying on Gig too much would be the equivalent of letting the world be destroyed. Instead, the player is expected to build and train an army of units capable of handling whatever comes his or her way, relying on Gig's powers as little as possible.

The player is given the ability to create and command squads, which, over time, will become an army capable of destroying the world he or she is trying to save. Up to 25 different character types can be created, each filling a unique position in the squad with its own strengths and weaknesses. Characters' individual abilities vary, such as increasing the range of an effect or giving each unit a bonus to its inflicted damage.

Tedious tasks like repeatedly visiting the same area in order to level new characters, a staple of older Nippon Ichi titles, are no longer necessary, as new units may be purchased up to the level of the main character. Unlike older Nippon Ichi titles, the player is not allowed to return to older levels. Squads can also be merged in order to increase their power.

The game includes more options for interacting with non-playable characters (NPCs) than previous Nippon Ichi games. It is possible to steal items from shops or NPCs instead of buying them, and the player can attack towns and fight against the NPCs inhabiting them. Alternatively, the player can recruit NPCs into her or his army.

== Story ==
=== History of Prodesto ===
In the backstory of the game, at the end of a long war-shattered age, Lord Median the Conqueror united the countries in the Continent of Prodesto under his rule. He became renowned throughout the world for his heroism, but, within ten years, the empire he had created collapsed with the death of his son, followed by his own death. With no apparent leader, the continent collapsed once more into civil war. Fifteen years later, Lord Median's daughter had proven herself as a true leader and convinced the remaining countries to form peace treaties, establishing peace once more.

This peace collapsed 50 years later, when the "Master of Death" Gig arrived with three giant beings known as World Eaters under his command. Over several days, they quickly devastated the land and entire nations, and it was not long before nations began abandoning their alliances and allying with the World Eaters in an attempt to save themselves.

When things looked their darkest, Layna gathered what remained of her forces and made a direct assault against Gig, a battle which apparently killed both of them. With their leader gone, the World Eaters fell silent after having apparently gone to sleep, remaining as monuments of the destruction that occurred.

=== Starting your Journey ===
The game starts in the year 800 in the Tamaito calendar, 200 years after the technique user Layna defeated the shadow and "The World Eaters" went silent. The body of one of the World Eaters remains in the peaceful country of Raide, serving as a symbol of fear to those who pass by it.

Within Raide, there exists the "Hidden Village", a small secluded village that refuses to acknowledge the existence of those from the outside world. The protagonist lives in the village along with their childhood friend Danette and other members of the Sepp race, helping to protect the village alongside Layna, whose age now exceeds 200.

One day, Layna summons the protagonist and Danette and gives them weapons to help guard the village. Danette, who has always dreamed of protecting the village, is overjoyed and is given twin daggers, while the protagonist is given a long black sword.

However, when the protagonist takes hold of the black sword, it begins to insult and swear at Layna, which the protagonist and Danette are confused by. It is revealed that, 200 years ago, Layna destroyed the shadow and sealed its soul into the black sword, with it now going by the name of Gig. To utilize the power of Gig, Layna chose to give the sword to the protagonist.

The protagonist is infused with the soul of Gig, gaining control of his power, and is now able to fight against the World Eaters, who have reawakened. With Gig residing in the hero's body, they and Danette depart for Raide to defeat the World Eaters.

=== The Demon Path ===
Soul Nomad is well known for its dark alternate mode, the demon path, which is accessed by choosing the "evil" dialogue options at the start of the game. In this route, Revya decides to use Gig's great power to essentially destroy the world, striking down both Layna and Danette at the game's outset. With Gig's eager assistance, the player controls Revya in his/her bloody rampage across the continent, as they become the tyrannical "Devourlord" and commit atrocities against the people of Raide. Like the normal mode, the demon path has numerous different dialogue options and endings, as well as unique characters Revya can dominate (mostly villains) that are unplayable in the normal game.

== Characters ==
=== Main characters ===
Hero (主人公, Shujinkō)
The player character, who is the only one who can wield the Onyx Blade and successfully fuse with Gig to make use of his powers. He/she has a voice during battle, but not during cutscenes, though the player can choose certain responses during the game to advance the story. Depending on the relationship choices, the main character is seen with the character he/she has had the strongest relationship with at the end of the Hero storyline. In the Demon Story, if the hero wins the final battle, he/she kills everyone on the planet and reverts to a power-hungry mindless creature that goes on to destroy the world of Drazil. The default name for the main character is "Revya".

The hero is available as a download for Disgaea 3: Absence of Justice. The character is female and known by the default name "Revya". She is a humanoid unit whose only weapon forte is the sword.

She was also a nominee as downloadable content for Disgaea 4: A Promise Unforgotten, but did not receive enough votes.

Gig (ギグ, Gigu)
The Master of Death, who came to Prodesto 200 years ago with the three World Eaters before being sealed into a sword by Layna and eventually fused into the main character. The fusion allows the main character to use some of Gig's power and ask Gig for more power, though he can lose his body to Gig if he does. He is known for being rather rude and prone to lying. In the Hero ending, he is reborn in his own body and leaves to find the hero and Danette. In the Demon ending, if the final battle is won, Gig loses control over the hero and is devoured, completing the fusion in the opposite way he desired. If the battle is lost, however, the brainwashing effect on him is destroyed and he remembers his life as Master of Death Vigilance.

Before the game's events, Vigilance, as Master of Death, was tasked with guiding the souls of the dead to the afterlife. When he came for Revya's soul, he fought with Lord Median and was killed. His soul then went to Drazil, where he was transformed into Gig.

Along with Revya, Gig is available as a download for Disgaea 3: Absence of Justice. In Disgaea 3, he is a monster-type with the ability to Magichange (transform) into the Onyx Blade.

Additionally, he was also released as downloadable content for Disgaea 2: Dark Hero Days in both the United States and Japan. However, due to a glitch in the PSN Store, Gig is currently only available for purchase in the Japanese version. He is a monster-type with the ability to transform into the Onyx Blade.

Gig also appears as a DLC character in Disgaea 4: A Promise Unforgotten, having the same stats as his last two appearances in the Disgaea series.

Danette (ダネット, Danetto)
The protagonist's childhood friend and a member of Sepp, a race of bovine-like people. She tends to one-up the main character, despite having a poor memory. Her village was destroyed by a cult that worships the World Eater Thuris as a god. Her parents were killed by the cult and became Crimson Tears; one of the Tears was used to strengthen the seal on the sword containing Gig when the main character obtains the sword, and the other was used to seal Danette's memory. Throughout the game, she threatens to snap various people's necks, though she never actually does. She was tasked with following the main character and ensuring that Gig never took control, using her other parent's Crimson Tear to further strengthen the seal if he ever did. In the Demon Path storyline, Danette joins the resistance against Gig wearing a suit of armour and going by the name the Silent Knight, as she cannot bear to speak with him after his transformation. When things seem futile, she sacrifices herself to become a crimson tear and summon Layna from Drazil so they may have a better chance of defeating the main character and Gig. If the player loses the final battle, the "Good" ending of the Demon Path has Dio of the Evil Eye use Danette's Crimson Tear to seal the main character into the sword Gig lived in until he can be redeemed.

Though she is not playable in Disgaea 3, she appears whenever Revya uses Holy Justice, their special combo attack in Soul Nomad.

Levin (レビン, Rebin)
A city guard of Astec and the third World Eater. Despite being a strong fighter, he is often overprotective of his older sister, Euphoria. When Levin was eight years old, he and his sister were acquired from the slave trading organization Yesterwind and were used as experiments, which caused Euphoria's illness. He dies when the main character kills the third World Eater; however, if his relationship is high enough, he can still be used upon arriving in Drazil. It is never explained how he and Euphoria are brought back to life at the end of the game. In the demon path storyline, Levin is the first person to fight and survive against the main character's evil version and not die or be seriously injured, causing people to flock to him when the resistance is formed.

Vitali (リタリー, Ritarī)
A silent man who works with Levin. Aside from being a cleric, he is also an efficient spy. If not for the current state of the world, he would have preferred to pursue a career as a chef.

Juno (ヨスト, Yosuto)
Commander of the Nereid land forces. She distrusts humans, but loves children, as she cares for a young human boy who she spoils rotten. She is honest and straightforward with people, and places high value on pride and friendship.

Grunzford (ガンツフルト, Gantsufuruto)
An aging Redflank encountered by the protagonist's group who often complains about the Sepp people, which includes Danette and Levin. He used to live in the village where the main character and Danette grew up; however, he left 10 years ago after disagreeing with Lady Layna on how to handle Gig, believing he should not be used as a weapon, instead thinking Gig should be sealed in the sword forever. Though his worries have no validity in the normal story, the Demon path plays out just as he feared it would. He joins the resistance to stop Gig, though believes that small raids on Gig and the main character will only waste lives.

Tricia (ドリーシュ, Dorīshu)
A young woman who is helping the town of Zazana fend off a group of bandits and seems to share a history with Grunzford. Though kind-hearted, she is often naive and impulsive. She wears a pin which she believes belonged to her mother, but actually belonged to her older sister, who now goes by the name Shauna. Her real family was one of the few that could afford the medicine to treat Scarlett Iago when it appeared 15 years prior to the game's events. Nearby villagers attacked her home looking for the medicine, and she was separated from her family as they were escaping. This led to her capture as an infant by the organization Yesterwind and eventually being sold to the man she believes is her father. In the Demon Path, she is raped and acts strangely before later killing herself.

Odie
A Dracon who attempts to impersonate Dio of the Evil Eye, and is encountered multiple times throughout the game. He is the brother of Dio, which is revealed to be the name given to the oldest brother in a line of Dracon wizards. He is shunned by his family for his inferior skills and goes elsewhere, in the process recruiting a man and his two phyxes to impersonate the three beings that are associated with Dio of the Evil Eye. After many defeats, he joins the main character's party and in the process becomes a better wizard. He knows Endorph and is friends with several angels.

=== Secondary characters ===
Endorph (エンドルフ, Endorufu)
A mysterious man who was found by the Nereids fifteen years ago, his body covered in burn scars. He took over Shauna's bandit gang, reforming it into a group who act in a Robin Hood esque fashion. In addition, he taught the Angel race how to wield guns. Endorph is actually the character Walnut from Phantom Brave, who ended up in the world of Soul Nomad after forcing the demon Sulphur through a dimensional portal. Endorph seemingly destroys Raksha after the hero wins the battle, using Psycho Burgundy to attack the World Eater, but the cutscene ends there. Should the player get Endorph's ending, he is revealed to be alive and living with Euphoria and their infant child. He is also referenced in Danette's ending, which mentions Euphoria's baby.

Shauna (シェマ, Shema)
The former leader of a bandit gang before Endorph usurped her position, who seems to hate everyone, especially the poor. She is later revealed to have history with Tricia. When Thuris commits suicide and spreads the deadly Scarlet Iago disease with his death blast, she gives her cure to Tricia in order to save her. Without a cure for herself, she succumbs to the disease and dies in Tricia's arms. In the Demon Campaign, she joins the main character out of hatred for Endorph and later takes care of the mentally broken Tricia until her suicide, at which point Shauna becomes an apathetic and nihilistic killer.

Thorndyke (ソーンダイク, Sōndaiku)
Grand Cordon of the Knights of Raide, who has two children. The first, named Richard was thought to be kidnapped by the Nereids. However, in reality the King of Raide hired Lobo, the leader of Yesterwind, to kidnap Richard and give him to the Nereids as a payment for curing the Queen. Though never stated, it is believed that Thorndyke became the Grand Cordon as a way to repay him. Upon discovering that Richard, now known as Penn, is alive and well in the care of the Nereids and enjoys living there, he decides to let him stay with them. When it is brought to his attention that the King of Raide is in possession of a Crimson Tear, which is considered a forbidden item, he steals it from the King and presents it to the ruling council. He is then captured and killed in front of his own knights by order of the king for treason. It is his death that inspires Galahad and other knights to turn against Raide and rebuild the city after it is destroyed by the World Eater, Feinne. In the Demon path, he attacks the main character along with the Nereids to save Penn before turning himself over to ensure Penn's safety. Kanan, who also works for the main character in the Demon Path, finds a child that resembles Penn and forces Thorndyke to kill him. Believing he has killed his own son, he goes insane and becomes a homicidal maniac for the remainder of the story.

Diness
The 12-year-old child queen of Orviska. Being the sole member of her family, she is forced to ascend to the throne, but takes advice from Dio of the Evil Eye. As a result, she becomes highly dependent on him, and is unable to make a decision without him. In the Demon Path storyline, she is separated from Dio and is forced to build up her confidence.

Cuthbert
Christophe's younger brother. Although he initially plays a small role at the beginning of the story, he is later discovered to have had a working relation with Lobo. When they are cornered at Yesterwind HQ, Cuthbert betrays and kills Lobo, claiming that since his hands are already dirty, his brother (Christophe) should not have to sully his as well. Following this, he commits suicide. In the Demon Path storyline, Cuthbert reveals that he originally joined Lobo to raise money to buy medicine for Christophe. He fears becoming bald.

Vangogh (ゲシュタル, Geshutaru)
A hotpod farmer who lives in the Orviska slums, he is recruited by Odie to pose as the Blazing Swordsman, Gestahl.

Kanan
The Dracon leader of the Thurist cult, who led the assault on Pulkina several years ago that killed many of its inhabitants, including Danette's parents. She is devoured by Thuris. In the Demon Path storyline, Kanan betrays Thuris and joins the main character. Vitali asserts that she is in fact male, which is further supported by Kanan's deeper voice during one of Danette's flashbacks, and her surprise at Danette recognizing her from Pulkina, as "[she] didn't even look like this back then". Her standard attacks are identical to that of generic female Dracons.

Layna
Also known as Layna the Firebrand, who sealed Gig into the protagonist's weapon.

Through the cutscenes in-game, it is revealed that some time before Layna took the throne, she sought out Virtuous, who killed Median in retaliation for killing Vigilance. During the fight, Virtuous convinced Layna to harbor her soul, which may have contributed to Layna's rise in power.

When Gig came to Prodesto fifty years later, Layna fought him to a standstill and was killed. It was at this point that Virtuous took over and sealed Gig away, being prepared to wait for 200 years until a soul worthy of wielding Gig's power came about. Layna's actual soul was sent to Drazil to act as a scout, taking down other Drazilians to free up souls.

Penn
A human boy currently under Nereid care, who is the son of the Grand Cordon of Raide. He was kidnapped by Lobo of Yesterwind to be given to the Nereids as payment to heal the Queen of Raide when he was a baby. Though the Nereids are protective of him, Juno takes her duty seriously and Penn often says that he plans to marry her once he gets older, though he believes and states to her she needs bigger breasts. In the Demon Path, he is given to the main character and takes to slaughtering with a passion that even Gig finds disturbing. He later sides with Levin, saying that he wants to follow the most powerful person.

Alexemia (アレキシミア, Arekishimia)
Queen of the Nereids, an all-female race of water-dwelling people. She is said to exhibit a special healing power that most humans cannot make use of.

Christophe
He controls trade throughout the Astec-Raide region and, despite appearing jovial and cheery, often acts in a secretive manner. He employed Vitali as his personal spy and keeps tabs on the main character. It is later revealed that Christophe had a past with Lobo.

Euphoria (アサギ, Asagi)
Levin's older sister. Despite being bad at cooking, she has a strong sense of hospitality and offers to cook for people, most of all Endorph.

Lobo (ロド, Rodo)
A Sepp man who runs an organization called the Yesterwind. Christophe and Cuthbert seem to know him. In the Demon Path storyline, he quickly joins the main character after hearing tales of the brutality caused by him/her, though later on chooses to leave the group.

Galahad (コーホート, Kōhōto)
A Chevalier under Thorndyke's command, who seems suspicious about Thorndyke's ascent to his position. In the Demon path, he is rescued by Gig and the main character after they injure him in the crossfire of fighting a World Eater. However, the events of the battle and the atrocities Gig commits cause him to go insane and believe himself to be a salesman.

Agrippa (アグリッピ, Agurippi)
A young angel who wears a pilot's hat and uses a gun he received from Endorph. He has a friendly relation with Odie. In the Demon Path storyline, he and the other angels are conscripted into forced labor by the main character before eventually being killed in front of Pinot.

Pinot (ピーナ, Pīna)
An angel who is usually seen hanging around with Agrippa.

=== World Eaters ===
Feinne
The first World Eater that the main character and Danette come across, she is the most powerful World Eater in Haephnes, as well as the most inactive. Gig describes her as his favorite World Eater of the three.

Thuris
The second World Eater that the main character encounters. He is physically the weakest of the three, but has the ability to become invisible. Following the defeat of Gig, Thuris created the cult of Thurists by leading his followers into worshiping him as a god. When Gig converses with him, he tells Thuris that he had become more like a human. Later on in the story, he reveals that he was responsible for spreading the plague of Scarlet Iago upon the world. Gig describes him as the most intelligent World Eater and the one he disliked the most. Upon his defeat, Thuris commits suicide by blowing himself up, spreading Scarlet Iago as a result.

Raksha
The third and final World Eater, Raksha is initially found to be dormant. It is later revealed that he managed to, with the help of Dio, separate his spirit from his body and place it in Levin's as a child, lying low until he meets Gig once again. His goal is to become so powerful that nobody would be able to tell him what to do. Gig states that Raksha was "always the hardest one to crack", since he is physically the strongest of the World Eaters. In the Demon Campaign, he defeats the main character early on as Levin, thus causing people to rally behind him as a hero. Upon gaining his former body, he chooses to fight against the main character, liking the attention he received as a hero.

=== Other characters ===
Lord Median
Lord Median was a war hero who ascended to the throne after uniting Prodesto beneath his rule. He ruled for ten years, before his sudden death caused Prodesto to fall back into ruin.

During that time, he had one son, Revya, who died several years later after succumbing to Scarlet Iago. Median, overcome with grief at losing his son and heir, was silently contacted by Drazil, who gave him the idea of killing the Master of Death in order to keep living. When Vigilance came to take Revya's soul, Median fought against him and killed him, setting Drazil's plan into motion.

Some time later, Median was killed by Virtuous, Master of Life, by having his soul taken from his body. His Onyx Blade, which can only be wielded by members of his bloodline, was used to seal Gig, and was later given to the protagonist.

He can be fought and recruited in an optional map.

Gestahl
A bandaged man who, along with the beasts Yavis and Parin, is inherited to the Dracon who takes on the name of Dio. Though he has power, he often tends to fall into a vegetative state, at which he must consume a soul in order to continue functioning, as seen in the Demon Path. At the end of the Normal Path, he is revealed to be Lord Median, now over 200 years old, and allows himself to be consumed by the Onyx Blade in order to pass on his power.

Asagi
Asagi is a girl who was supposed to be the main character of a future Nippon Ichi game. However, as the game was likely scrapped, she has appeared in various games as post-game content, wanting to be the main character of the games she appears in. In Makai Kingdom: Chronicles of the Sacred Tome, she becomes Zetta's apprentice in order to become stronger, after which she seems to have turned on Zetta and arrives in Soul Nomad during the fight against Feinne.

Asagi, calling herself the Queen of Games, wants the spot as the lead character, but Gig prefers to ignore her and continue to fight Feinne. Asagi then gets upset and destroys Feinne with only a bazooka shot, amazing even Gig, stating that Feinne was the most pathetic end boss she has ever seen. She then challenges Gig and the hero to a battle, during which she destroys the world with her power.

Asagi can be recruited after the battle, but starts to complain about her fate of being always a hidden character. Gig scolds her, since, by destroying the world, she ended his story, thus forcing him to start the game all over again.

== Reception ==
Reception

Aggregate score
Aggregator	Score
Metacritic	73/100

Review scores
Publication	Score
1Up.com	B+
Edge	6/10
Eurogamer	7/10
Game Informer	7.75/10
GamePro	3/5
GameSpot	8/10
GameZone	6.2/10
IGN	7.5/10
PlayStation: The Official Magazine	7/10
X-Play	3/5

The game received an aggregate score of 73/100 from Metacritic, indicating "mixed to average reviews".
