= Tohato =

Japanese food company

Tohato Inc.
- Native name

Japanese name
- Kanji: 株式会社東ハト
Transcriptions
- Revised Hepburn: Kabushiki-gaisha Tōhato
- Website: tohato.jp

Tohato Inc. (株式会社東ハト, Kabushiki-gaisha Tōhato) is a Japanese food company that specializes in snack food. They are known for their variety of the caramel corn snack, manufactured since 1971.

== Company history ==
In March 2003, Tohato applied for court protection from creditors after the failed operation of a golf course started during the asset-inflated bubble period. Following that, Unison Capital and Bandai acquired Tohato's confectionary business and set up a new company under the name of Tohato to turn its operations around.

=== Advertisement campaign ===
Tohato launched two new snacks brands, "Tyrant Habanero Burning Hell Hot" and "Satan Jorquia Bazooka Deadly Hot" in 2007 in an engagement marketing campaign, by combining multiplayer online gaming with advertising on a mobile phone. Customers were encouraged to join nightly battles at 4AM in a virtual game, on behalf of either snack brand, to determine the winner of the "World's Worst War". The campaign was designed by Japanese ad agency Hakuhodo and won the Yellow Pencil award at the annual D&AD advertising awards ceremony where mobile ads were recognized for the first time in May 2008.

== Products ==
- All Raisin
- Beano
- Bōkun Habanero
- Caramel corn
- ふわ丸 (Fuwamaru) Ninja snack
- Harvest
- Poteco
- Chocobi (チョコビ)
