= Hiroshi Minagawa =

Japanese video game designer and director

- 皆川 裕史
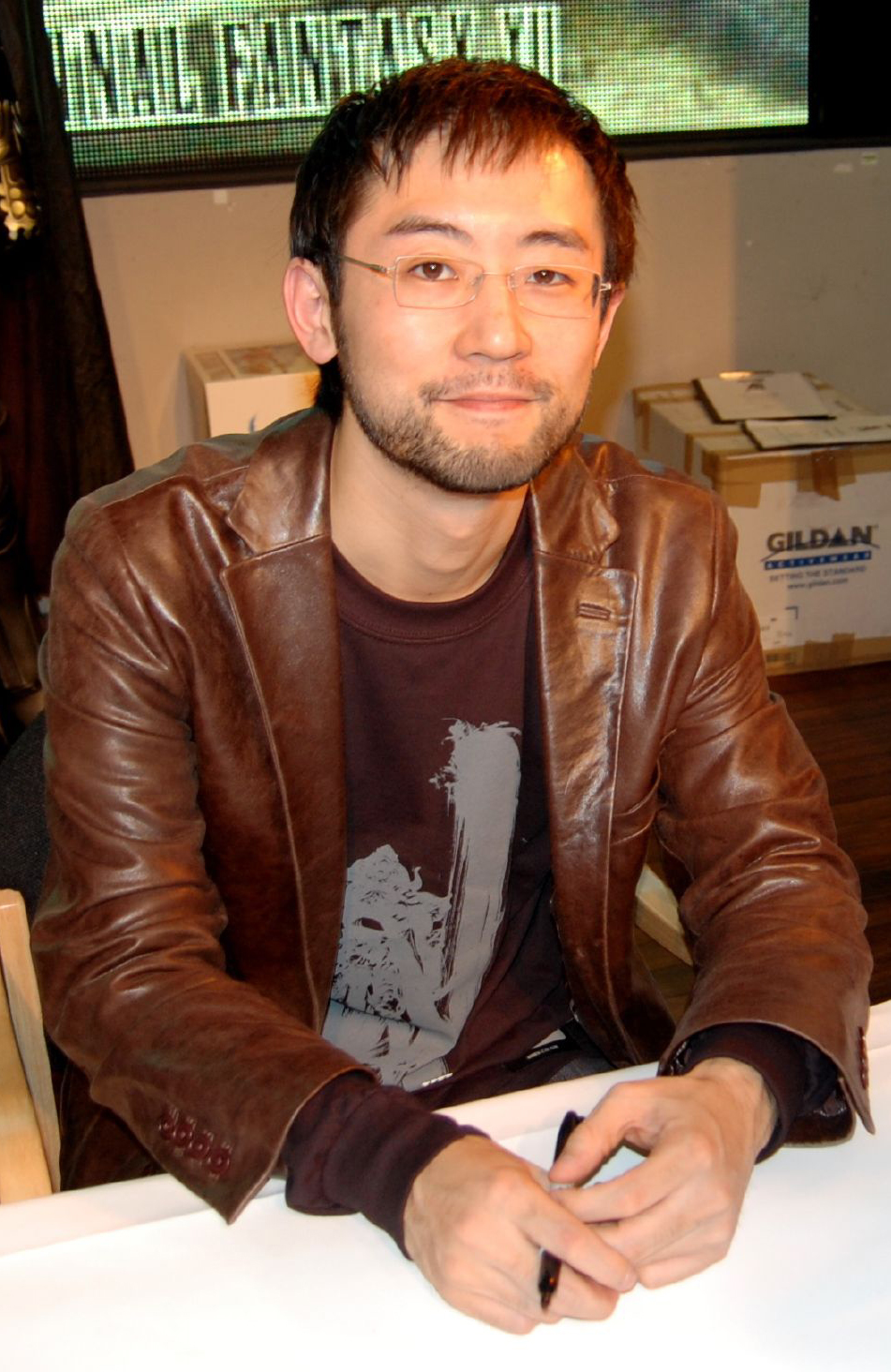
- Minagawa attending the European launch of Final Fantasy XII in 2007
- Born: August 11, 1970 (age 56)
- Other name: Nigoro
- Occupations: Video game artist, designer and director
- Years active: 1989–present
- Employer: Square Enix (1995–present)

Hiroshi Minagawa (皆川 裕史, Minagawa Hiroshi; born August 11, 1970), also known by the nickname Nigoro, is a Japanese video game artist, designer, and director.

== Career ==
Minagawa had worked at Quest Corporation alongside his colleagues Yasumi Matsuno and Akihiko Yoshida before they all decided to switch to Square in 1995. He continued collaborating with his co-workers as the art director of Final Fantasy Tactics and Vagrant Story. For Final Fantasy XII, he was originally the graphics and real-time visual director. However, when the original director Matsuno left the company due to an illness, Minagawa was put in charge of directing the game in collaboration with Hiroyuki Ito. He felt that the pressure of working on a Final Fantasy installment helped him and influenced his decisions. Minagawa most enjoyed the period in which the team continued to come up with new ideas, but he ultimately had to decide to abandon many features in order to finish the game.

Following the positive reception of Final Fantasy Tactics: The War of the Lions, a decision was made to remake Quest's Tactics Ogre: Let Us Cling Together. Minagawa directed the game and took on the laborious task of assembling the original 1995 staff members—including Matsuno—who were now working at different companies. Upon finishing his work on the project, Minagawa was asked to join the Final Fantasy XIV team as the lead user interface and web designer. This was part of a plan to salvage the game after its initial negative reception by critics and players. Director Naoki Yoshida considered the fact that one of the Final Fantasy XII directors was now solely responsible for one aspect of Final Fantasy XIV an indication of how serious Square Enix was about improving the game. A relaunch for the game, called Final Fantasy XIV: A Realm Reborn, was released to critical acclaim in August 2013.

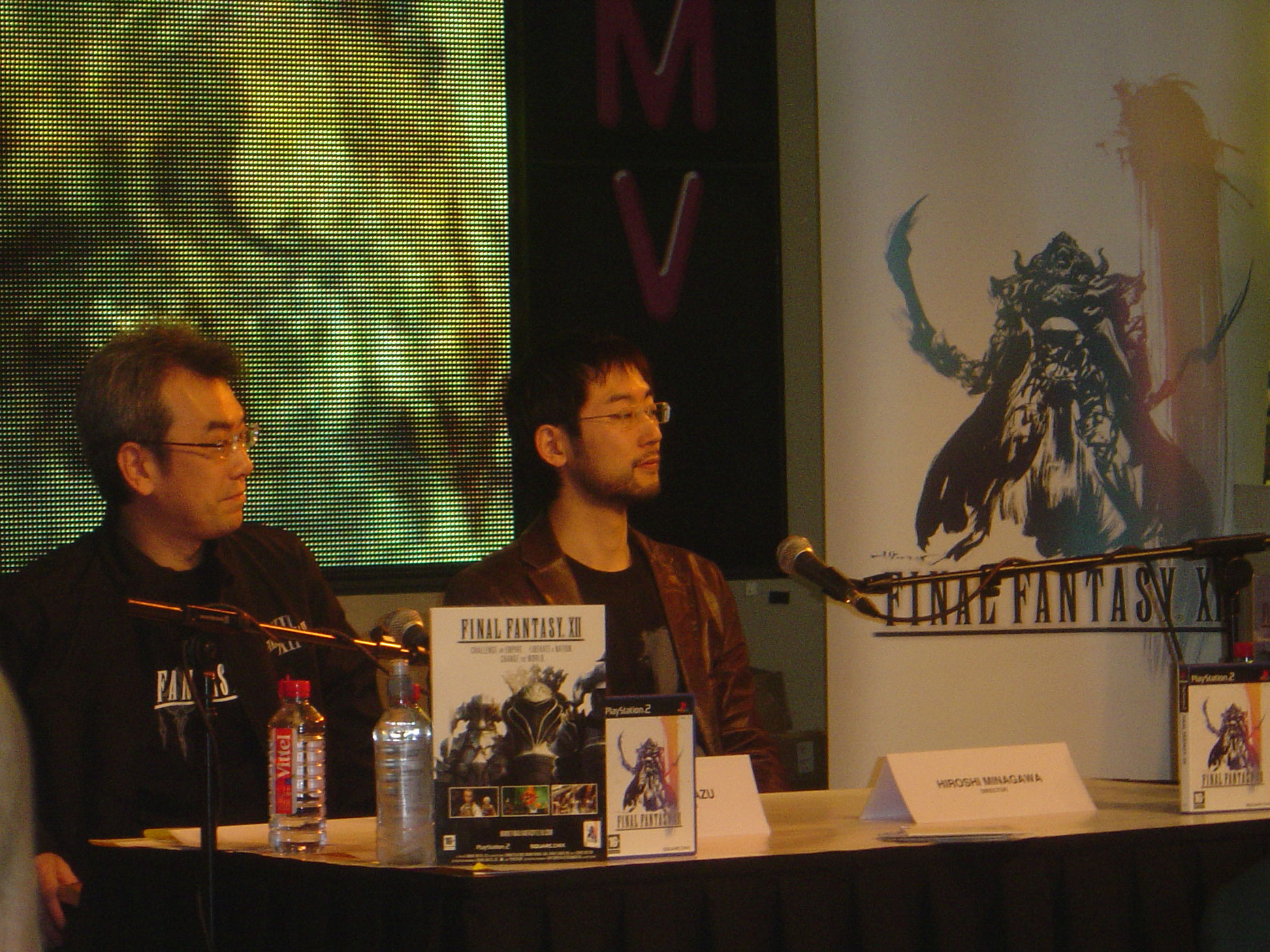
Hiroshi Minagawa (right) at the European launch of Final Fantasy XII

After several years of working on the Final Fantasy XIV patches and expansions, Minagawa left the team to work on an unannounced game. This game would eventually be revealed to be Final Fantasy XVI, and released on June 22, 2023. Minagawa served as the game's art director and was in charge of the real-time graphics. When the game's director Hiroshi Takai described to him a visual style with a similar theme to Game of Thrones, Minagawa sought to blend character designer Kazuya Takahashi's light art style with the dark tone of the game, which he described as his biggest challenge during development. He has also said that his main focus with the game's graphics was on the lighting and post-processing visual effects.

== Ludography ==
Year	Title	Credit(s)
1991	Magical Chase	Director, game design, art direction, CG design
1993	Ogre Battle: The March of the Black Queen	Art direction, main graphics design, image effects
1995	Tactics Ogre: Let Us Cling Together	Art direction, system CG design
1997	Final Fantasy Tactics	Art direction, event direction
2000	Vagrant Story	Art direction, character model supervisor, artistic supervisor of menu, and layout
2000	Final Fantasy IX	Special thanks
2003	Final Fantasy Tactics Advance	Artistic supervisor
2006	Final Fantasy XII	Director, visual design, character texture supervisor
2007	Final Fantasy Tactics: The War of the Lions	Original staff: Art director, event director
2007	Final Fantasy XII International Zodiac Job System	Director, visual design, character texture supervisor
2007	Final Fantasy Tactics A2: Grimoire of the Rift	Visual design supervisor
2009	Gyromancer	Special thanks
2009	Final Fantasy XIII	Crystal Tools development staff
2010	Final Fantasy XIV	Special thanks: Crystal Tools
2010	Tactics Ogre: Wheel of Fortune	Director
2013	Final Fantasy XIV: A Realm Reborn	Lead UI designer, lead web designer
2015	Final Fantasy XIV: Heavensward	Lead UI designer
2016	Dragon Quest Builders	Supervisor
2017	Final Fantasy XIV: Stormblood	Art director
2017	Final Fantasy XII The Zodiac Age	Supervisor
2018	Dragon Quest Builders 2	Special thanks
2019	Final Fantasy XIV: Shadowbringers	Art director
2021	Final Fantasy XIV: Endwalker	Special thanks
2022	Tactics Ogre Reborn	Supervisor
2023	Final Fantasy XVI	Art director
2024	Final Fantasy XIV: Dawntrail	Special thanks
2025	Final Fantasy Tactics: The Ivalice Chronicles	Art Director
