= Naoki Yoshida =

Japanese video game producer (born 1973)

- 吉田 直樹
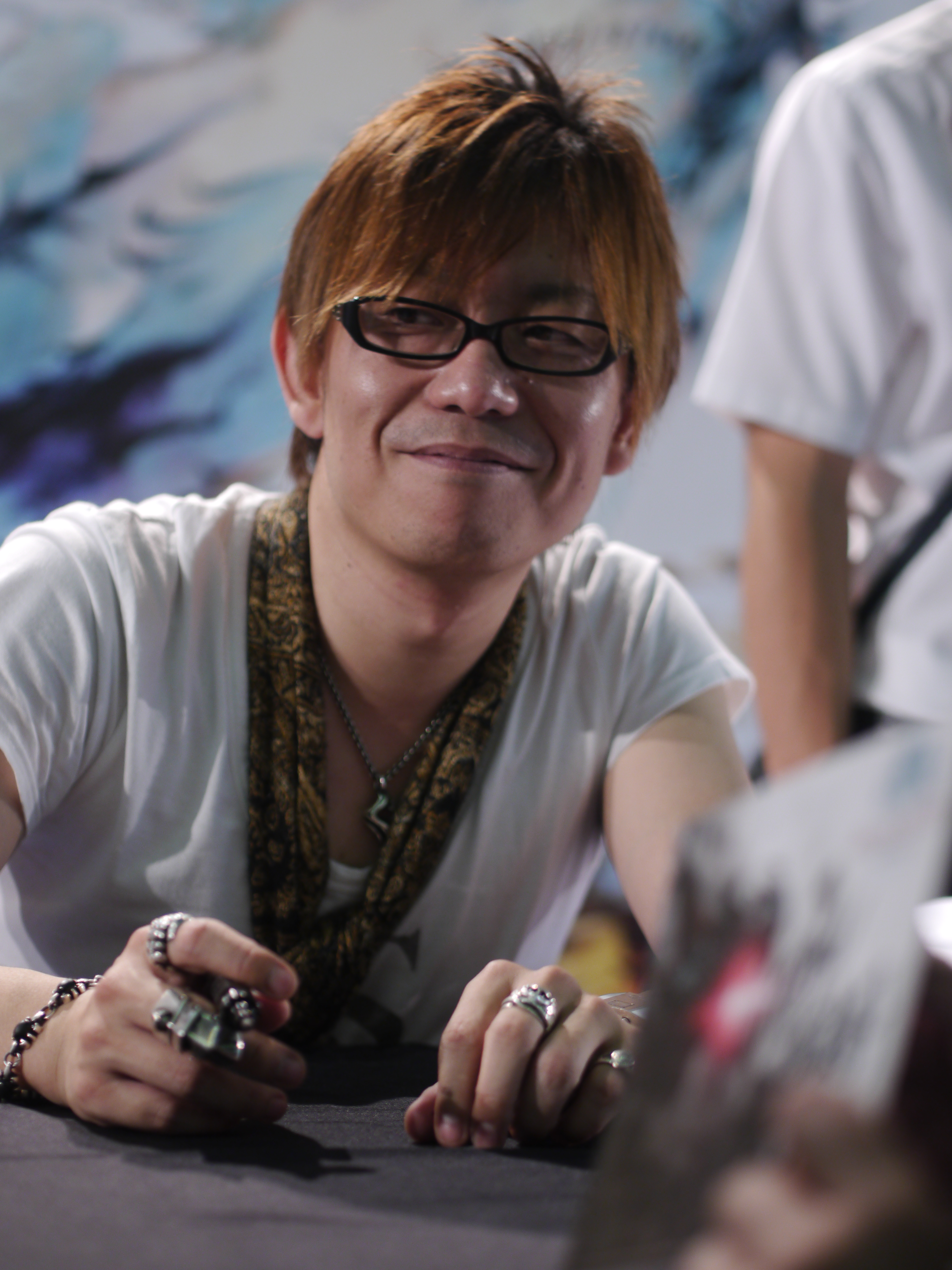
- Yoshida in 2013
- Born: May 1, 1973 (age 53); Sapporo, Hokkaido, Japan
- Other name: Yoshi-P
- Occupations: Video game producer and director
- Years active: 1993–present
- Employer: Square Enix

Naoki Yoshida (吉田 直樹, Yoshida Naoki; born May 1, 1973), also known by the nickname Yoshi-P, is a Japanese video game producer, director and designer working for Square Enix. He is best known for his work on massively multiplayer online role-playing games (MMORPGs), mainly as director and producer of Final Fantasy XIV: A Realm Reborn and its expansions.

Commentators such as Game Informer credit Yoshida with the revival of the original Final Fantasy XIV project, a game which was previously notable for its negative reception after its 2010 release. Yoshida became a part of the Final Fantasy Committee, a group tasked with keeping the franchise's releases and content consistent, in 2014. In 2015, he became an executive officer at Square Enix and the head of Creative Studio III (formerly Creative Business Unit III).

== Biography ==
=== Early life and career ===
Yoshida knew he wanted to work on video games in elementary school. His career choice was influenced by two Nintendo Entertainment System games. Mario Bros. introduced the idea that people could control television content and showed the possibilities of multiplayer design. Dragon Quest III inspired him to become a writer because he became more engrossed by its story than by books or films. He spent his formative years in Hakodate, balancing high school studies with a part-time job running a toy store's game corner.

Due to financial constraints in his youth, Yoshida worked to fund his gaming hobby. This led him to complete as many games as possible, sometimes hundreds of hours on a single title, and spend as much time as possible in arcades. Tactics Ogre, directed by Yasumi Matsuno, is one of his favorites. It made such an impact that he built his career in order to have the opportunity to create a game with Matsuno.

Yoshida joined the video game industry in 1993. He studied at a school run by Hudson Soft, where teaching came from many senior developers, concurrently with an internship at the studio. Although he preferred Chunsoft, he accepted an internship at Hudson as that allowed him to begin working sooner and provide financial support for his mother during a period of personal difficulty. He loved the company's games as a child, and wanted to help the company regain its former energy as its influence waned. He was assigned to the creation of PC Engine games at first. His desire to be a scenario writer got him placed to work in the Far East of Eden series. His role kept expanding, eventually working under Oji Hiroi's supervision on the original Far East of Eden III: Namida, which was ultimately moved to the PC-FX. Yoshida was happy throughout the production with his position, writing all the villager dialogue, but the game was cancelled when he was almost done.

An avid fighting game fan, Yoshida indirectly influenced the balance of Street Fighter EX. A business trip to the AOU Show had a pre-release build of the game available to play where he achieved sixty consecutive victories, the last three against members of the Arika team developing it. On the released version, the character Yoshida attained all those wins with, Zangief, was drastically weaker than before.

Yoshida participated as a designer in the Bomberman series. He faced a harsh environment; programmers held control over productions, saw designers as useless, would not realize documents if they found them boring, and had no patience for people that did not understand or tried to broach their field. Yoshida had to develop his persuasion skills to handle that dynamic; communication in his case was easier than with other designers because he studied coding beforehand. To make the games he wanted to, Yoshida built trust with management and among his colleagues by taking on undesirable projects.

His first experiences playing online games such as Diablo and the Ultima Online beta test left a huge impression and turned him into an avid fan. Yoshida submitted three proposals to Hudson's internal new project contests: a multiplayer first-person shooter, a PlayStation 2 multiplayer Dungeon Explorer revival and a PC space exploration MMORPG. After four and a half years at the company, Yoshida left Hudson due to creative differences. Yoshida saw all titles he worked on as fun for all ages, but his superior only thought of them as made for children: "I couldn't work in a company that'd allow a person like this to be a manager. As soon as he told me that, I answered that I quit".

After leaving Hudson Soft, he worked at several smaller game studios for five years. These included a studio founded by a former Hudson executive who recruited him. A partnership with Enix saw them develop a Windows online action RPG with randomly generated dungeons and a Diablo-like system, designed by Yoshida and produced by Yosuke Saito. After the merger, higher-ups ordered a pivot to make it cross-platform with the PlayStation 2 and PlayOnline-compatible. The heads of Square's business divisions had high hopes for the project; staff involved in Final Fantasy XI offered support, advice, and the game's garbage collection source code. Management concluded that a story mode was required. However, because the team had already reworked the game twice to meet previous demands, a debate ensued over how to inform the developers, ultimately leading the company to shelve the project.

While working on the game, Yoshida proposed a tool to run different variations of events in online games by combining preset settings, to aid Toshio Murouchi, a then new member of the PlayOnline operations team.

=== Career at Square Enix ===
Following the game's shelving, Saito invited Yoshida to "take his revenge" by moving to Tokyo and working on what was then called Dragon Quest Online. The former Hudson executive encouraged him to take the offer if he promised to climb the corporate ladder and bring work to that studio. Yoshida joined Square Enix in 2004 as the fourth member of the Dragon Quest X team; as chief designer, besides handling the writing alongside Yuji Horii, with Jin Fujisawa as director. Frustrated at how MMORPGs had not become popular in Japan, Yoshida felt that if Dragon Quest could not do it, nothing else would, which drove him to join the project.

His work on the franchise at the time extended to arcades, as he concurrently helmed the Dragon Quest: Monster Battle Road series. Similarly, Fujisawa was involved in Dragon Quest IX, whose team struggled to decide the project's focus. Eventually, that game required his full attention to be completed, so circa late 2007, he appointed Yoshida as acting director for Dragon Quest X—an arrangement that lasted over a year and a half—due to his "indisputable competence" and trustworthiness.

Yoshida's involvement lasted from its early stages up to the internal alpha test; under his tenure, the core systems were completed, several systems went from existing only in the document to implemented in working order, and time-consuming parts like character and map graphics were made. The idea to loan player characters as NPC party members came as a result of preserving series integrity: "When working in all Dragon Quest projects, the theme is not about complexity but having a game that's really easy to get into". Yoshida intended to stay with Dragon Quest X until it went gold, but Square Enix policy prohibited multiple directors from working on the same project. Once Fujisawa could return as a full-time director on the game, Yoshida's superiors removed him from the team while he was away on a business trip.

Ordered to create something new, Yoshida worked on two projects. As one of Square Enix's "stray dogs", he, Hiroshi Takai, and Hiroshi Minagawa had been sent to various influential Western studios in 2009 to study HD game development techniques. Upper management felt a need to compete with Western games commercially outside Japan, and asked them to make a project the same way as Westerners. They spent a year working on this game, whose visual and game design settled on something extremely similar to Bloodborne with asymmetric multiplayer. Yoshida steered the project as a learning experience for the younger team members, as he wanted to train future directiors. That led to an extremely slow development process and subsequently, multiple arguments between Takai and Yoshida. Elsewhere, a desire to make a card game that parents and children could play together led Yoshida to conceive the car-centric Chōsoku Henkei Gyrozetter for arcades.

At the same time, Final Fantasy XIV was facing difficulties right before and right after launch. The "stray dog" trio was pulled into a task force to diagnose that game's issues. They held frequent nightly meetings with members of that team, with Yoshida articulating approaches from both a director and player perspective. It was concluded early on that a solution to all the problems would only be possible as a group effort. After further meetings with the president and vice president of Square Enix included, it was decided in December 2010 to place Yoshida in charge of the staff as both director and—for the first time in his career—producer. Then company president Yoichi Wada attributed this decision to Yoshida's experience, "charismatic" leadership skills and "passionate" will to satisfy customers. The HD game oriented towards western tastes was abandoned, while the Chōsoku Henkei Gyrozetter team—which was still working on pre-production at the time—carried on without Yoshida.

Yoshida was not acquainted with any of the Final Fantasy XIV team's members and thus had to demonstrate his dedication to the project first to gain their trust as director. He then talked with the individual developers to find out their ideas for improvements to the revised version known as Final Fantasy XIV: A Realm Reborn. He proceeded to describe to the team the precise goals to achieve. Yoshida drew some inspiration from his long-lasting enthusiasm for MMORPGs, having played some games, including Ultima Online, EverQuest, Dark Age of Camelot, World of Warcraft, Warhammer Online, Rift, Star Wars: The Old Republic, and Guild Wars 2. Game Informer and other commentators have credited Yoshida's direction with "rescuing" the Final Fantasy XIV project. He went on to work with Matsuno in creating the Return to Ivalice raid for Final Fantasy XIV: Stormblood, saying he "was able to fulfill [his] dream to work with Matsuno-san".

Between December 2013 and 2019, Yoshida wrote a regular column for Famitsu titled "Yoshida Uncensored" (吉田の日々赤裸々), discussing his thoughts on Final Fantasy XIV, video games, the game industry, and game development in general. It has been collected into three published volumes. Yoshida ended the column in December 2019 due to a lack of time to write it. In September 2020, Yoshida served as a producer for the PlayStation 5 video game Final Fantasy XVI.

== Works ==
Year	Title	Credit(s)
1998	Star Soldier: Vanishing Earth	Special thanks
1999	Weltorv Estleia	Special thanks
1999	Bomberman 64: The Second Attack	Story mode director
2003	N.U.D.E.@ Natural Ultimate Digital Experiment	Special thanks
2007	Dragon Quest: Monster Battle Road	Director
2007	Dragon Quest Swords	Special thanks
2009	Dragon Quest: Monster Battle Road II Legends	Director
2010	Dragon Quest: Monster Battle Road Victory	Director
2010	Final Fantasy XIV	Director, producer
2012	Dragon Quest X	Chief planner
2013	Final Fantasy XIV: A Realm Reborn	Director, producer
2015	Final Fantasy XIV: Heavensward	Director, producer
2015	Final Fantasy: Brave Exvius	Special thanks
2015	Final Fantasy Grandmasters	Division executive
2015	Final Fantasy XI: Rhapsodies of Vana'diel	Division executive
2016	Dragon Quest Builders	Division executive
2016	Kingsglaive: Final Fantasy XV	Special thanks
2016	Final Fantasy XV	Special thanks
2017	Final Fantasy XIV: Stormblood	Director, producer
2017	Itadaki Street: Dragon Quest and Final Fantasy 30th Anniversary	Special thanks
2017	Final Fantasy Dimensions II	Special thanks
2018	Dissidia Final Fantasy NT	Special thanks
2018	Dragon Quest Builders 2	Division executive
2019	Final Fantasy XIV: Shadowbringers	Director, producer
2021	Final Fantasy XIV: Endwalker	Director, producer
2022	Stranger of Paradise: Final Fantasy Origin	Special thanks
2023	Theatrhythm Final Bar Line	Special thanks
2023	Final Fantasy XVI	Producer
2024	Final Fantasy XIV: Dawntrail	Director, producer
2024	Fantasian: Neo Dimension	Co-producer
2027	Final Fantasy XIV: Evercold	Director, producer

=== Books ===
Year	Title	Ref.
2016	Yoshida Uncensored Volume 1	
2018	Yoshida Uncensored Volume 2	
2019	Yoshida Uncensored Volume 3	
