= Final Fantasy XIV: Evercold =

2027 Final Fantasy XIV: A Realm Reborn expansion pack

- Collector's edition cover art depicting the Warrior of Light as a Reaper
- Developer: Square Enix Creative Studio III
- Publisher: Square Enix
- Director: Naoki Yoshida
- Producer: Naoki Yoshida
- Composer: Masayoshi Soken
- Series: Final Fantasy
- Platforms: macOS; Nintendo Switch 2; PlayStation 4 (Note: Until circa 2028); PlayStation 5; Windows; Xbox Series X/S
- Release: February 23, 2027
- Genre: MMORPG
- Mode: Multiplayer

Final Fantasy XIV: Evercold (Note: In Japanese: ファイナルファンタジーXIV: 白銀の探求者(ワンダラー) (Hepburn: Fainaru Fantajī Fōtīn: Hakugin no Wandarā; lit. Final Fantasy XIV: Wanderer of the Silver)) is the upcoming sixth expansion pack to Final Fantasy XIV, a massively multiplayer online role-playing game (MMORPG) developed and published by Square Enix for Windows, macOS, Nintendo Switch 2, PlayStation 4, PlayStation 5, and Xbox Series X/S. It will be released on February 23, 2027, over two years after Dawntrail, the previous expansion. Like its predecessors, Naoki Yoshida served as director and producer and Masayoshi Soken composed the soundtrack. The expansion pack will be released as a standalone product for current players; for new players, the "Complete Edition" that originally launched with Heavensward will be updated to include all expansions including Evercold.

In Evercold, players travel to the Fourth, a parallel world to the initial setting of A Realm Reborn, where the world has been ravaged by an ice age. The surface now rendered uninhabitable, the populace have fled to enormous airships in the skies above the Fourth. The player seeks to avert the Solstice, in which the many parallel worlds will eventually catastrophically merge. In addition to adding new areas, the expansion pack increased the level cap, debuted two character classes, and an "Evolved" combat system. Support for PlayStation 4, which first began in 2014, is set to end midway through the expansion's patch cycle.

== Gameplay ==
The gameplay of Evercold largely matches that of the base game. Players interact with each other in a persistent world that responds to their actions. The two new jobs in Evercold are Bastion, a tank that wields dual shields, and Zephyr, a ranged DPS class akin to a falconer with a crossbow. Both jobs are original to Final Fantasy XIV, not based on previous entries in the series. Bastion acts as a main tank, a new distinction among tank classes that focuses on parrying and countering enemy attacks, whereas off tanks focus on supporting and defending allies. Their shields can shift between a melee-focused shield mode and a long-range gun mode. Zephyr is a ranged damage dealer that calls a magical bird called Nephele to attack. They can also ride the bird to perform crossbow attacks while on the move. Evercold also introduces a new play style dubbed Evolved mode that simplifies the required input from players, to create a more streamlined battle experience. Old jobs will retain their original style now dubbed Reborn, but will also receive an option to play them in Evolved mode. The two new jobs, Bastion and Zephyr, will only feature Evolved mode.

== Plot ==
Artwork showcasing various characters from Evercold, clockwise from top: an unnamed male, Halmarut, Visna, Estinien, Lagertha, Alphinaud, Calyx, and an unnamed female, with the Warrior of Light (center).

=== Setting and characters ===
Eons ago, the planet Etheirys was shattered into the Source and thirteen parallel worlds or 'reflections' during a great battle between the primal gods Hydaelyn and Zodiark. Evercold takes place on the Fourth of those reflections. The Ascians, servants of Zodiark, disrupt the elemental balance of the reflections by manipulating events to coax them into rejoining the Source world. They shifted the Fourth toward ice, resulting in an ice age which forced the populace to build massive airships to escape to the skies. These realmships and the Fourth as a whole are inspired by Norse mythology. They include Naglfar, realmship of Water, Hringhorni, realmship of Fire, Sessrymnir, realmship of Earth, and Skiðblaðnir, realmship of Wind.

Evercold continues the "Godless Realms" saga that began in Dawntrail. With the death of Hydaelyn during Endwalker, the barriers between the remaining reflections began to weaken. If left unchecked, the reflections would attempt to rejoin as one, a catastrophic event dubbed the Solstice that would reset the entire world to a state before life existed. The Ascian Halmarut seeks to use the Fourth as a sacrifice to prevent the Solstice from happening and the player's character, the Warrior of Light, pursues them to the Fourth, after Halmarut's companion Calyx tips them off as to her intentions. The Warrior of Light is joined by longtime allies Alphinaud and Estinien, the pair accidentally transported to the Fourth alongside the Warrior, after a vision of a face from their past.

== Development ==
Evercold marked a major shift in design philosophy for Final Fantasy XIV. Director Naoki Yoshida named "evolution" as a main theme motivating revisions to gameplay systems, user interfaces, and content. Recognizing changing patterns in player behavior, Yoshida and the development team adjusted the game's live service model away from daily repeatable content to a weekly and seasonal schedule. Furthermore, they deprecated the existing character progression system involving collecting a time-gated amount of upgrade currency, "tomestones", in favor of a more flexible system that encourages a variety of play styles. Another major focus is giving players more avenues for self-expression and customization. These include more options in character creation, including eye, hair, and skin tone and unrestricted combinations of race-specific features, unlockable animations for actions, and more control over equipment appearance.

Evercold takes strong inspiration from Norse mythology for its setting and themes. The German translation team contributed cultural knowledge and a member of the team connected them to an Icelandic professor who studies the topic. They consulted with language professionals to ensure spellings and pronunciations were authentic.

As with previous expansions, Evercold features a number of collaborations with other series. "Beyond the Lifestream" is a set of raids based on the Final Fantasy VII Remake trilogy. The Remake development team integrated extensively with the XIV team to produce the raids, with character designs by Tetsuya Nomura and writing by Kazushige Nojima and Motomu Toriyama. A typing minigame called Keybound Brawler was also added towards the end of Dawntrail, its first iteration a tie-in with the Final Fantasy VII Remake trilogy. The large-scale alliance raid series in Evercold is a collaboration with Neon Genesis Evangelion called "Ghosts of Desire".

=== Release and patch history ===
Evercold was originally announced for a January 2027 launch window, but it was delayed to the following month. In the months prior to launch, the "Road to Evercold" promotion provided lapsed players with one month of free subscription time and free items for subscribed players, as well as a limited-time option to purchase an item that would place them at the story quests immediately prior to Evercold. Yoshida described this promotion as an interim solution to the problem of new players who would otherwise need to play through multiple expansions' stories to reach the latest expansion. Early access to Evercold will begin on February 19, 2027, for players who pre-ordered the game with the full release on February 23.

=== Music ===
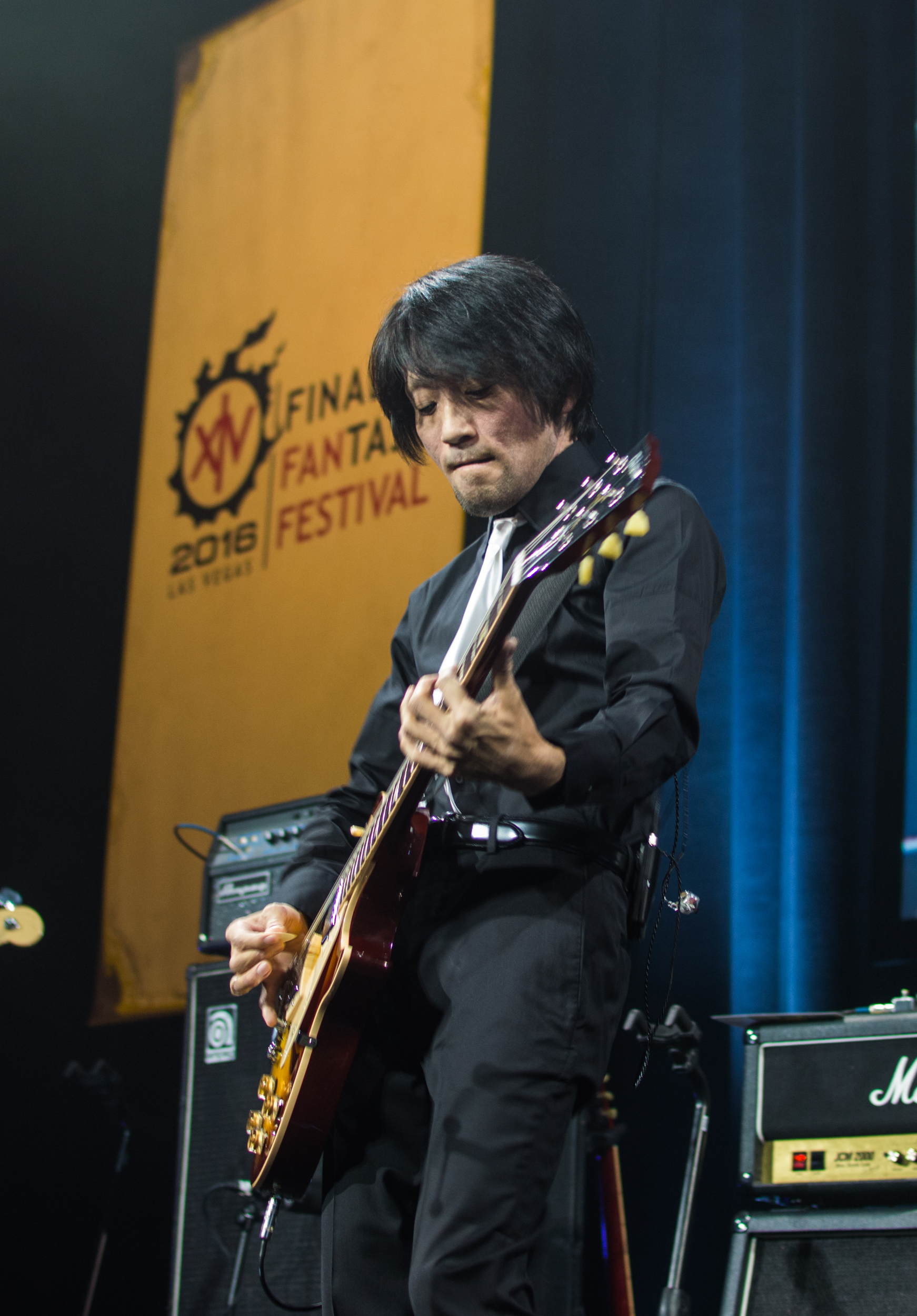
Masayoshi Soken composed the soundtrack to Evercold.

Masayoshi Soken again serves as lead composer for Evercold in addition to his duties as sound director. He composed and recorded parts of the main theme song, "Evercold", while traveling to perform at Download Festival in Birmingham with his band, The Primals.
