= Final Fantasy XIV =

2013 video game

- Collector's edition cover art
- Developer: Square Enix Business Division 5 (Note: Now Square Enix Creative Studio III)
- Publisher: Square Enix
- Director: Naoki Yoshida
- Producer: Naoki Yoshida
- Designers: Naoki Yoshida; Nobuaki Komoto
- Artists: Hiroshi Minagawa; Akihiko Yoshida; Takeo Suzuki
- Composers: Masayoshi Soken; Nobuo Uematsu
- Series: Final Fantasy
- Platforms: macOS; PlayStation 3 (Note: Until June 2017); PlayStation 4 (Note: From April 2014 until circa 2028); PlayStation 5; Windows; Xbox Series X/S; Nintendo Switch 2
- Release: PlayStation 3, Windows; August 27, 2013; PlayStation 4; April 14, 2014; macOS; June 23, 2015; PlayStation 5; May 25, 2021; Xbox Series X/S; March 21, 2024; Nintendo Switch 2; August 4, 2026
- Genre: MMORPG
- Mode: Multiplayer

Final Fantasy XIV (Note: Initially subtitled Final Fantasy XIV: A Realm Reborn (ファイナルファンタジーXIV: 新生エオルゼア, Fainaru Fantajī Fōtīn: Shinsei Eoruzea; lit. Final Fantasy XIV: Reborn Eorzea), the game as a whole is now simply called Final Fantasy XIV.) is a subscription-based massively multiplayer online role-playing game (MMORPG) developed and published by Square Enix. Directed and produced by Naoki Yoshida and released worldwide for PlayStation 3 and Windows in August 2013, it replaced the failed 2010 version, with subsequent support for PlayStation 4 in April 2014, macOS in July 2015, PlayStation 5 in May 2021, Xbox Series X/S in March 2024, and Nintendo Switch 2 in August 2026. Final Fantasy XIV is set in the fantasy region of Eorzea, five years after the devastating Seventh Umbral Calamity which ended the original version. In the Calamity, the elder primal Bahamut escaped from his prison, an ancient space station called Dalamud, unleashing an apocalypse across Eorzea. Through temporal magic, the player character of the original version escaped, reappearing at the start of A Realm Reborn. As Eorzea cements its recovery, the player must fend off a reignited invasion from the Garlean Empire.

The original Final Fantasy XIV was a commercial and critical failure. Then-Square Enix President Yoichi Wada announced that a new team, led by Yoshida, would assume control and address the game's flaws. The new team both continued to develop and improve the original version, and secretly worked on a completely new replacement. This new game, codenamed "Version 2.0", used a new engine, improved server infrastructure, and revamped gameplay, interface, and story. The original version shut down in November 2012, followed by an alpha test for Version 2.0.

The relaunched game released to largely positive reception; critics praised its solid mechanics and progression, and commended Yoshida for an unexpected recovery. In the years since, it has been listed as one of the greatest games of all time. After a poor 2013 fiscal year, Square Enix attributed the 2014 return to profitability partly to the game's strong sales and subscriber base. By October 2021, it had gained over 24 million registered players and became the most profitable Final Fantasy game to date. Final Fantasy XIV has received regular updates since release, including six major expansion packs: Heavensward (2015), Stormblood (2017), Shadowbringers (2019), Endwalker (2021), Dawntrail (2024) and Evercold (2027). An adaptation for mobile devices was announced in 2024 but was cancelled in July 2026.

== Gameplay ==
Final Fantasy XIV is an MMORPG, featuring a open world where players can interact with each other and the environment. Players create and customize their characters for use in the game, including name, race, gender, facial features, and starting class. Unlike in the original release, players may only choose to be a Disciple of War or Magic as a starting class—Disciples of the Hand and Land are initially unavailable. Players must also select a game server for each character. While all supported languages are available on every server, data centers are located in specific regions (i.e., North America, Europe, Japan, and Oceania) to reduce latency between client and server, and players are advised to choose a server in their region. Regardless of server or language, players can use a large library of automatically translated game terms and general phrases, allowing players who speak different languages to communicate.

=== Interface ===
Final Fantasy XIV's PC beta version interface, navigated by a point and click widget system

Final Fantasy XIV's home console interface, navigated by a cross-bar system

PC and home console versions use a unified user interface (UI) and control scheme allowing for any combination of keyboard, mouse, and game controller. On PC, the game defaults to drag and drop menus, whereas on the console versions, the default interface resembles the PlayStation 3's XrossMediaBar. This bar is used to access menus, maps, logs, and configuration options. The head-up display for both versions includes a message log, party status menu, mini-map, and action bar. The size and location of all UI elements may be customized.

Actions and battle commands differ between PC and console versions. The PC versions support both point and click and keyboard input for commands or macros. Macro commands are customizable sequences of actions that allow players to execute desired abilities at a specific time. The home console versions instead map the action bar and macros to the "Cross Hotbar"—sets of four icons arranged in a cross shape. These are the grouped and accessed through a combination of the shoulder buttons and the directional pad or the face buttons. Using each shoulder button to cycle through the cross sets, players have quick access to commands. This interface is also available to PC players who use controllers.

=== Character progression ===
Players improve their characters by gaining experience points (EXP) and acquiring stronger equipment. After gaining enough XP, the character will "level up", improving their statistics, enhancing the character's performance, and often learning new actions. Primary sources of experience points in Final Fantasy XIV include completing quests, exploring instanced dungeons, participating in Full Active Time Events (FATEs), and slaying monsters in the world. Quests, including the "main scenario" questline, are generally short, specific tasks given to the player by non-player characters which reward items and EXP. Completing main scenario quests progresses the overarching plot of the game. Some quests are repeatable, either "daily" quests repeatable each day, or "Levequests", which consume "leve allowances" that the player slowly accrues over time. Dungeons often require multiple players to form a party to enter, but the Duty Support system enables the player to play certain dungeons alone, supported by computer-controlled party members. Some dungeons are for lower-leveled players to gain EXP quickly while others are for experienced players to collect rare items, equipment, and currency. The Duty Roulette system randomly assigns the player to an accessible dungeon, and once per day, awards additional bonus EXP scaled to character level on completion. FATEs permit large groups of players, whether or not they are in a party, to participate in a shared task in the world. These location-specific events include battles with notorious monsters, defending locations, escorting non-player characters, culling wildlife, and assaulting enemy fortresses, among other types. Finally, each enemy the player kills provides EXP, with further EXP available from the Hunting Log, for killing a fixed amount of specific creatures. At maximum level, character progression focuses entirely on acquiring stronger equipment, raising the character's "item level". This equipment can be gained through a variety of sources including endgame dungeons, crafting, raids, primal battles, and elite mark hunts.

In addition to these player versus environment (PvE) challenges, various forms of player versus player (PvP) combat exist in Final Fantasy XIV. The Feast was an arena featuring structured four-versus-four battles where a player could register with up to three teammates to challenge another four-person team. This mode was removed in patch 6.1, when it was replaced with Crystalline Conflict, which consists of two teams of five competing to seize control of and push a crystal which starts at the middle of the arena to each team's goal point. The second type, Frontlines, is a large battleground in which players form teams of up to 24 members. Teams are delineated by players' allegiance to one of three Grand Companies and the team which reaches the target number of points first wins the match. Multiple modes are available, each with differing locations and rulesets. Within the game, Frontlines is presented as an organized set of military exercises between the three nations with the ulterior goal of jockeying for dominance of regions rich in magical artifacts. The third type, Rival Wings, is a battle arena mode where players manipulate minion waves and pilot mechs to destroy enemy objectives. PvP matches grant unique currency separate from the main currency "Gil." The PvP currency may be exchanged to obtain exclusive items, including armor and weapons.

=== Battles and party system ===
Players fight enemies using a combination of physical attacks, weapon skills, and magical attacks; these battles form the basis of party play in Final Fantasy XIV. Most battle content in the game requires parties of a specific size, including four players for dungeons and eight players for boss battles. The "Duty Finder" is an automated matching feature that sorts players into parties for selected content across different servers. The "Party Finder" is a bulletin board where players may recruit players from any server on their data center for any kind of content including dungeons, raid battles, FATE parties, and more. Members of a party fill traditional MMORPG roles like tank, healer, and damage dealer. Tanks draw the enemy's attention away from other party members who generally have weaker defense, healers use restorative abilities and support the party with damage and enhancing abilities, and damage dealers focus on attacking the enemy. Teamwork and strategy are required to defeat the strongest enemies. "Limit Breaks" are special abilities that can only be performed if members of the party excel at their roles.

Free Companies are player-run guilds, organized bands of adventurers under the auspices of one of the three Grand Companies of Eorzea. Free Company members may gain access to a shared company chest, a private chat channel, and Company Actions which are 24-hour buffs to certain aspects of gameplay, such as increased EXP gain or reduced gear damage. Free Company members may also pool their resources to purchase a house in one of the residential districts. In addition to decorating the house, players may use the grounds to grow unique items through the gardening system, train their chocobo companion, embark on airship expeditions, and purchase a private room for personal use. Linkshells are another form of in-game networking; whereas players may only belong in one Free Company, they may join multiple linkshells which act as private chat channels for interested sub-groups.

=== Armoury and job system ===
Under the Armoury System, a character's equipped weapon determines the character class and players may change their class at will by changing weapons. Classes are divided into four disciplines: Disciples of War, masters of physical combat; Disciples of Magic, practitioners of the magical arts; Disciples of the Hand, crafters and handymen who synthesize and repair items; and Disciples of the Land, gatherers who collect resources from the environment. The Job System builds upon the Armoury System for Disciples of War and Magic. It allows access to powerful skills, magic, weapons, and armor exclusive to the job corresponding to that class. These jobs, many based on classic Final Fantasy character jobs, are more suited to party-based combat.

=== Game economy ===
The virtual economy of Final Fantasy XIV is largely player-driven. The exchange of items is facilitated by retainers—non-playable characters who assist in selling items on the Market Board, gather items through ventures, and provide additional item storage. A small transaction fee for all sales serves as a gold sink to regulate the inflation of prices in the economy. Players of any class may contribute to the supply of the economy: Disciples of the Land acquire raw materials from gathering points throughout the game world; Disciples of the Hand craft the materials into useful items and equipment; and Disciples of War and Magic are able to procure rare materials through completion of dungeons and Treasure Maps. Players are also able to contribute by extracting "materia" from well-used equipment, which can then be used to improve the statistics of other equipment.

The mechanics of crafting and gathering have changed between the original release and A Realm Reborn. Most of these changes are geared toward reducing the randomness and guesswork involved in these processes. For Disciples of the Hand, all recipes of the appropriate level are unlocked by default in the Crafting Log. Crafting abilities have been rebalanced to allow successful high-quality synthesis without requiring multiple mastered Disciplines of the Hand. For Disciples of the Land, players are allowed to select which item they would like to attempt to collect at a gathering point, whereas before, the results of gathering attempts were randomized. The Gathering Log also displays the names and locations of items that can be gathered in the world. Fisher, a Disciple of the Land, does not share the same gathering system as the other two Disciples of the Land (Miner and Botanist), instead using a unique rod and spear fishing system. Fishers also have access to Ocean Fishing, an instanced duty of up to twenty four players in which they have seven minutes at each of three fishing locations aboard a ship, after which rewards are given according to the points they have earned.

== Plot ==
=== Setting ===
Final Fantasy XIV is set on Hydaelyn, a fictional world of diverse environments across multiple continents, focused on the region of Eorzea. Eorzea features four prominent city-states: Gridania, in the heavily forested Black Shroud; Ul'dah, a trade-centric sultanate in arid Thanalan; Limsa Lominsa, a thalassocracy on the island of Vylbrand; and Ishgard, an isolationist theocracy in snowy, mountainous Coerthas. A land bridge links Eorzea to two other continents to the east, which have largely been conquered by the Garlean Empire. Other societies include indigenous tribes, such as Ixali and Kobolds; Sharlayan, a scholarly city; and Ala Mhigo in eastern Eorzea, annexed twenty years prior by the Garlean Empire. Facing Garlean invasion, Ishgard withdrew from the Eorzean Alliance, leaving it defunct. The once-vibrant Mor Dhona region was devastated during the previous Garlean campaign.

Eorzean history is divided into prosperous "Astral" eras, and disastrous "Umbral" eras caused by great Calamities. The First Umbral Era marked the end of the age of gods. The Twelve, guardian deities of Eorzea, retreated from direct mortal contact. As society recovers from Umbral eras, new Astral eras begin. Under the hegemonic Allagan Empire of the Third Astral era, technological development reached its zenith, including aerospace construction. As each Calamity was linked to one of the six fundamental elements—air, lightning, fire, earth, ice, and water—the Sixth Astral Era was expected to last forever, but five years ago, the Garlean Empire triggered the Seventh Umbral Calamity.

Garlean scientists working on Project Meteor weaponized the lesser moon Dalamud. Under Legatus Nael van Darnus, they would annihilate Eorzea by crashing the moon, exterminating all opposition. The Alliance reunited in response, reviving their Grand Company militaries. Adventurers defeated van Darnus but could not stop Dalamud's descent. At the Battle of Carteneau Flats in Mor Dhona, Dalamud revealed itself as an ancient Allagan prison for the primal dragon Bahamut; his escape triggered the Seventh Umbral Calamity. Louisoix Leveilleur called upon the Twelve to imprison Bahamut, but failed; before he sacrificed himself to defeat Bahamut, he sent the adventurers "beyond the reach of time" for when they were needed again. Meanwhile, the Empire became paralyzed by a succession crisis as the elderly Emperor Solus fell ill.

=== Characters ===
The player character is an Eorzean adventurer during the Seventh Umbral Era who joins one of the Grand Companies: Gridania's Order of the Twin Adder, under Elder Seedseer Kan-E-Senna; Ul'dah's Immortal Flames, under Flame General Raubahn Aldynn; and the Maelstrom of Limsa Lominsa under Admiral Merlwyb Bloefhiswyn. Their allies include Minfilia and her Scions of the Seventh Dawn, a rebuilt Sixth Astral Era organization uniting Louisoix's Circle of Knowing and Minfilia's Path of the Twelve. Members include Thancred, Yda, Papalymo, Urianger, and Y'shtola. Y'shtola often represents Final Fantasy XIV in crossovers like Theatrhythm Final Fantasy: Curtain Call and Dissidia Final Fantasy NT. Louisoix's twin grandchildren, Alphinaud and Alisaie, follow his example to aid Eorzea. Finally, Cid Garlond heads Garlond Ironworks, a technology company providing airships, weapons, and infrastructure to the Alliance.

Garlean antagonists include Legatus Gaius van Baelsar of the XIVth Imperial Legion and his lieutenants, Livia sas Junius, Rhitahtyn sas Arvina, and Nero tol Scaeva. The tribes also threaten the uneasy peace by summoning primals, aetherial deities which drain the land's life-sustaining energy. Both are manipulated by the Ascians, hooded immortals hellbent on awakening their dark god Zodiark, imperiling all of Hydaelyn.

=== Story ===
The game opens with a vision of the player character defeating a masked, black-robed man. The adventurer awakens shortly before arriving at the starting city, Gridania, Ul'dah, or Limsa Lominsa. Returning players from the original version appear in a column of light. Through odd jobs and tenacity, the player joins the city's Adventurer's Guild, and is favorably compared to the "Warriors of Light" who vanished in the Seventh Umbral Calamity. The adventurer thwarts attacks by mysterious masked men and earns the attention of the Scions. Minfilia reveals the player's visions are the Echo, a power marking chosen representatives of Hydaelyn, the deity for whom the world is named.

Freshly inducted, the adventurer and Thancred investigate abductions and crystal thefts in Thanalan by the Amalj'aa tribe, who capture the player for their primal, Ifrit, to enthrall, but the Echo blocks Ifrit's "tempering". Instead, the adventurer defeats the primal, and is hailed a hero, courted by all three Grand Companies. During memorial services for the Battle of Carteneau, the player meets Alphinaud and Alisaie, who part over disagreement about such nationalist displays' purpose. The Scions send the adventurer to the Black Shroud to forge ties with the Sylphs, a peaceful tribe whose radical faction has summoned Ramuh against the Garleans. While rescuing the Sylph elder, the adventurer encounters another masked man, Lahabrea, a leader of the mysterious Ascians.

Minfilia sends the player to thwart Kobold efforts to summon Titan. The Scions seek advice from retired primal-fighting Company of Heroes. After a series of trials disguised as banquet preparations, the Company's leader reveals the way. The adventurer defeats Titan, learning that Lahabrea is aiding Gaius van Baelsar who has renewed his designs on Eorzea. The adventurer returns to the Scions' headquarters to find slaughter: Minfilia and others were captured by Garleans, and the remaining Scions slain. After funeral rites for the fallen, Alphinaud returns to recruit the adventurer, aiming to rebuild the Scions and defeat the freshly-summoned Ixali primal, Garuda. To confront Garuda in her own domain, they must awaken the memories of an amnesiac Cid Garlond.

Cid, Alphinaud, and the adventurer travel to Coerthas, territory of reclusive Ishgard, seeking Cid's lost airship, the Enterprise. After befriending Isghardian commander Haurchefant Greystone and foiling a heretic plot, they recover the Enterprise from a fortress overrun by dragons. Cid, aided by the adventurer's Echo, regains his memories as a Garlean engineer, Eorzean defector, and genius inventor. The adventurer acquires a rare crystal to cut through Garuda's vortex, and the two fight until Garuda torments Kobold and Amalj'aa prisoners of war into resummoning Titan and Ifrit. However, Gaius and Lahabrea intercede with the Ultima Weapon, an ancient Allagan warmachine, which consumes all three primals to increase its power. At Lahabrea's urging, Gaius plans to conquer Eorzea using the Weapon, but the Ascian intends to trigger a Calamity with it.

After recovering additional members, the Scions rescue Minfilia and the others, learning that Lahabrea has possessed Thancred. Intruding on an Alliance leadership meeting, Alphinaud and Minfilia persuade them to choose resistance instead of surrender. The Scions join the Alliance in a massive counteroffensive, Operation Archon. The adventurer assaults Gaius' stronghold, the Praetorium, where Gaius pilots the Ultima Weapon in battle. Shielded by Hydaelyn's Blessing of Light, the adventurer destroys the Ultima Weapon, leaving Gaius behind in the explosion. Lahabrea defeats the adventurer himself, revealing the Calamities are part of a process to resurrect the Ascians' god, Zodiark. Hydaelyn revives the adventurer and they purge Lahabrea from Thancred's body, as in the prologue vision. With the threat of Garlean invasion lifted, the Grand Company leaders declare the beginning of the Seventh Astral Era. The player's character is hailed as a hero of the same caliber as the Warriors of Light.

==== Seventh Astral Era ====
Facing increasing scrutiny and pressure to align with one of the three allied city-states, the Scions relocate to Revenant's Toll, an adventuring hub in neutral Mor Dhona. Word quickly arrives that renegade moogles, aided by Ascians, have summoned a primal, Good King Moggle Mog XII. After besting him, the Warrior encounters the enigmatic Ascian Emissary, Elidibus, who tests the player's might before disappearing. Soon, refugees arrive from Doma, a nation subjugated by the Garlean Empire, bringing word of Emperor Solus' death. The Doman refugees seek asylum in Ul'dah but are refused. Alphinaud recommends work as tradesmen to reconstruct Revenant's Toll. In gratitude, the Doman leader, Yugiri, accompanies the party to reconnoiter the spawning grounds of the Sahagin, who summon Leviathan. Taking the Lominsan warship The Whorleater, the adventurer slays Leviathan.

Alphinaud investigates riots among Ala Mhigan refugees in Ul'dah, finding manipulation by Teledji Adeledji, an influential member of Ul'dah's ruling Syndicate. Raubahn suspects Adeledji hopes to monopolize artifacts discovered at Carteneau, including remnants of Omega, an ancient Allagan superweapon. In the Black Shroud, the Sylphs summon Ramuh, who judges the Warrior of Light as a worthy savior upon his defeat, departing amicably. Meanwhile, Alphinaud incorporates the Crystal Braves as an Eorzea-wide Grand Company. Their first task is to investigate the "Ivy", a Garlean spy embedded in the Immortal Flames. Haurchefant and Ser Aymeric of the Temple Knights of Ishgard reach out, unprecedentedly, to the Scions and Braves, seeking aid with the Keeper of the Lake—the wreckage of Garlean airship Agrius, intertwined with the corpse of Midgardsormr, the draconic progenitor who repelled a massive Garlean advance fifteen years previous. In exchange, Haurchefant agrees to safeguard supply shipments to Revenant's Toll, which had been harried by the followers of Lady Iceheart, an Ishgardian heretic.

The Garlean civil war ends with Varis zos Galvus assuming the throne, lending new urgency to the search for the Ivy. The Braves discover she is Raubahn's trusted advisor Eline Roaille, capturing her at the gates of a Garlean Castrum. Yda's friend Moenbryda arrives from Sharlayan and provides critical advice for locating Iceheart. Using her body as a vessel, Iceheart summons Shiva into herself and challenges the Warrior of Light. Though the adventurer's band defeats Shiva, Iceheart implies having a connection with Hydaelyn, bidding the meddler to consult with Midgardsormr before escaping. From the Warrior's encounters with Lahabrea and Shiva, Moenbryda hypothesizes that a "blade" of pure aether can permanently destroy an Ascian while its essence is trapped within white auracite. Lucia of the Temple Knights requests the Warrior of Light investigate the Keeper of the Lake. They discover Midgardsormr still lives, slowly regenerating from his apparent death. He divulges that Nidhogg, one of his seven children, has rallied the Dravanian horde to renew their attack on Ishgard. Midgardsormr seals away Hydaelyn's blessing as a test of the adventurer's worth. The Ascian Nabriales takes advantage of the opportunity to infiltrate the Scions' headquarters, seeking Louisoix's staff, Tupsimati, a powerful relic. Moenbryda sacrifices herself to create the blade of aether necessary to vanquish the Ascian.

As the Scions mourn their fallen comrade, Aymeric parleys for aid in Ishgard's defense against Nidhogg's forces. Minfilia and Alphinaud reluctantly pledge the Scions' support, though all Alliance members decline. The adventurer and the Scions repel Nidhogg's forces at Ishgard's main bridge. A victory celebration is held at Ul'dah, hoping to return Ishgard to the Alliance. Ul'dah's sultana Nanamo Ul Namo privately tells the Warrior that she plans to dissolve the monarchy and make Ul'dah a democratic republic. However, Nanamo succumbs to poisoned wine and collapses; Adeledji accuses the adventurer of regicide. When he denounces Raubahn for his negligence, the enraged Raubahn kills him. Lolorito, another Syndicate member, takes this as proof of Raubahn's guilt and has him also arrested. Many Crystal Braves turn coat to Lolorito and pursue the Scions, most of whom stay behind to cover the escape. Only the Warrior and a humbled Alphinaud escape, aided by Raubahn's adopted son Pipin Tarupin. Cid takes them to Coerthas, where Haurchefant grants them asylum.

== Development ==
The difference in battle interfaces between the final patch version of the original game (top) and A Realm Reborn

The original release of Final Fantasy XIV began development under the codename Rapture between late 2004 and early 2005, and was officially announced in 2009. This version was directed by Nobuaki Komoto and produced by Hiromichi Tanaka, who was also serving as the producer of Final Fantasy XI, and employed the Crystal Tools engine, which had previously been used for Final Fantasy XIII. Following a bug-laden, abbreviated beta test period, the game was released in September 2010 to near-universal negative reception. After two extensions to the initial free trial period, then-Square Enix President Yoichi Wada issued a formal apology to players and fans in December, and announced a dramatic overhaul in the development team, most prominently the removal of Tanaka from the project and the demotion of Komoto from Director to Lead Designer. Monthly fees for the game were suspended until further notice and the previously planned PlayStation 3 version was canceled. After the change in development team, Naoki Yoshida, who had worked as planning chief of Dragon Quest X, was brought in to supervise the project as both producer and director.

In attempting to improve Final Fantasy XIV, Yoshida quickly discovered a number of key tasks. First and foremost, he had to restore trust in the player base while bringing the game up to a playable quality. To address this, Yoshida began writing "Letters from the Producer" which would discuss design direction, upcoming changes, player feedback, and increase transparency in the development process. However, outdated and cumbersome programming choices in the source code prevented the more radical modifications necessary to enhance the game. Thus, planning for a brand new game built from scratch started in January 2011 and development began in earnest by April, with work on a new game engine and server structure. Meanwhile, the team's efforts to improve the original release first came to fruition with patch 1.18 in July, which included major changes to the battle system, implementation of auto-attack and instanced dungeons, removal of the controversial "fatigue" system, and the introduction of the Grand Company storyline which would supersede the original main scenario questline. Subsequent patches would further refine the gameplay as well as set the stage for the Seventh Umbral Era events.

On the anniversary of the game's release, Wada claimed that the initial launch of Final Fantasy XIV had "greatly damaged" the Final Fantasy brand. Thus, Wada and Yoshida announced the brand new version of Final Fantasy XIV in October, code-named "Version 2.0", which had been in development since January, along with a tentative roadmap for future progress for both PC and PlayStation 3. Current players would be provided copies of the new PC client at launch, free of charge, and their character data and progress would be transferred as well. Along with the roadmap, they announced that monthly fees would be instated in order to offset the cost of redevelopment. Billing for the game began in January 2012. To encourage users to continue playing while paying subscription fees, Yoshida revealed the "Legacy Campaign" which rewarded players who paid for at least three months of service with permanently reduced monthly payments, an exclusive in-game chocobo mount, and their names featured in the credits of Version 2.0.

At Electronic Entertainment Expo 2012, Square Enix debuted "Agni's Philosophy", a tech demo for their new Luminous Studio game engine. Though members of the Final Fantasy XIV development team worked on Luminous, Yoshida admitted that both Luminous and Crystal Tools were optimized for offline games and could not handle an online environment with hundreds of on-screen character models. Though Version 2.0 uses a "completely different engine", he called the Luminous engine and the 2.0 engine "siblings" due to similarities in their structure. That July, Square Enix revealed that Version 2.0's official title would be Final Fantasy XIV: A Realm Reborn. As development for A Realm Reborn ramped up, Yoshida made the decision to shut down the servers for the original release on November 11. This date served as the "grand finale" for the old game, culminating in a cinematic trailer for A Realm Reborn called "End of an Era".

In a project postmortem at Game Developers Conference 2014, Yoshida reflected on the herculean task of maintaining and updating an MMORPG while simultaneously developing a new one over the course of just two years and eight months. He identified three main reasons why the original launch failed: an over-emphasis on graphical quality, a lack of modern MMORPG expertise in the development team, and a mentality that all problems could be fixed in future patches. These evolved from the team's prior experience on Final Fantasy XI, the previous MMORPG in the Final Fantasy series. As the series has been renowned for its state-of-the-art graphics, the original development team gained an unhealthy obsession with maximizing graphical quality at the expense of server performance, which was unsustainable for an online game with tens of thousands of high definition assets. In designing Final Fantasy XI, the team spent a year playing EverQuest, the most successful MMORPG of the early 2000s. However, they lacked experience with modern games in the genre; the original Final Fantasy XIV team was instructed merely to make something "different from Final Fantasy XI". Yoshida admonished that the team should "go play World of Warcraft for a year [for inspiration]" instead.

A prevailing design philosophy for A Realm Reborn was to simultaneously appeal to hardcore MMORPG players while reaching out to new players and Final Fantasy fans who had never experienced the genre before. As a consequence, Yoshida held optimizing gameplay for controllers as a top priority. To streamline development, he made about 400 fundamental design decisions which eliminated time lost to getting approvals, with a focus on implementing standard features of the genre first. The new workflow pipeline was tested using updates to the original game and applied to development of A Realm Reborn. The continuing operations of the original release provided a valuable testing ground for new features that would be carried into the relaunch. Another focus was to appeal to busy players without a lot of free time, which led to creating the Duty Finder system. The base game and patch cycle were also designed to make it easy for lapsed players to return to. Throughout this process, Yoshida emphasized that communication with players and restoring their trust was key, even admitting that sales were secondary compared to redeeming the reputation of the series. Live streaming conversations between the development team and fans, such as the Letters from the Producer LIVE events, became a major element of Yoshida's player outreach strategy.

=== Testing and release ===
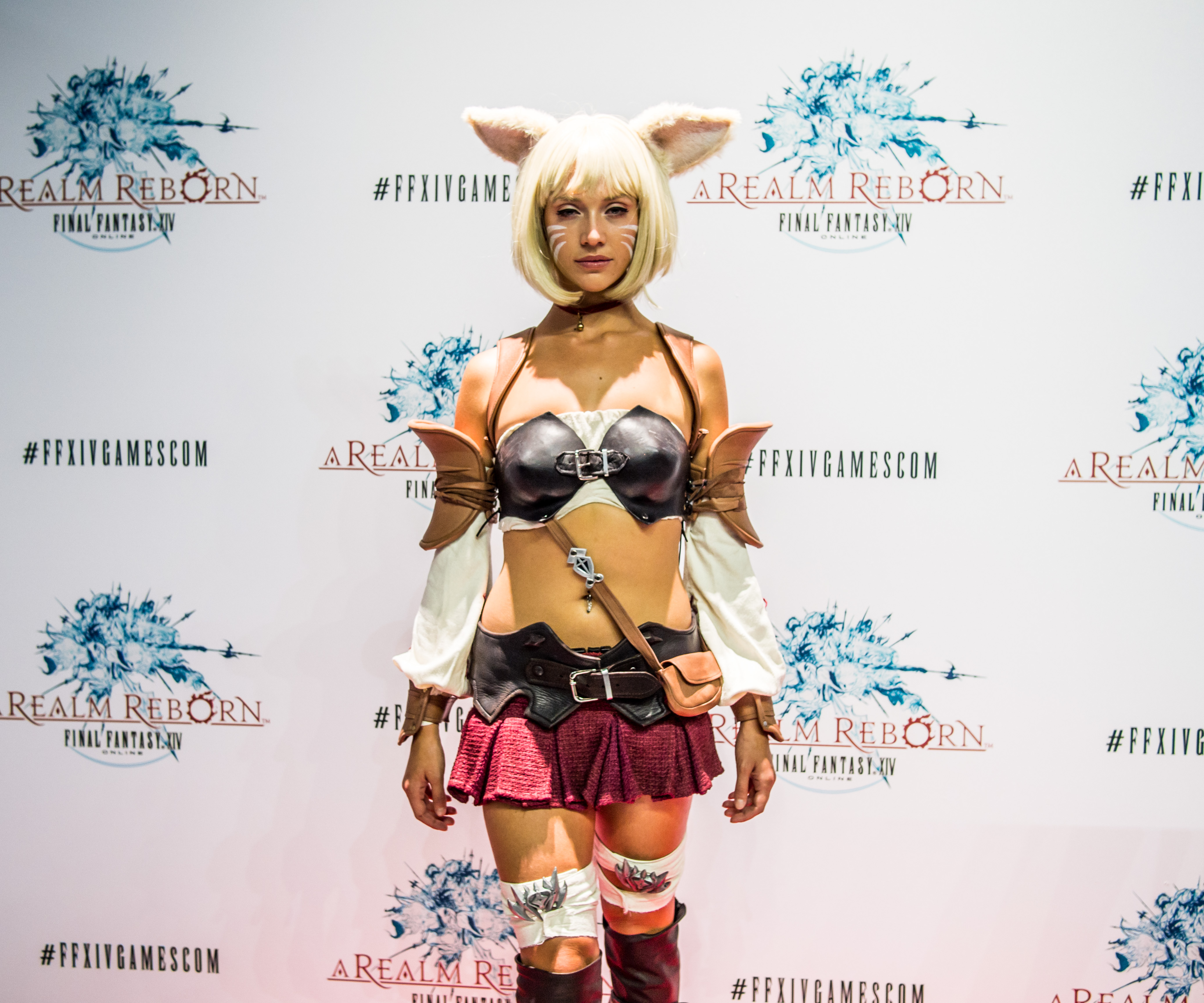
Final Fantasy XIV promotion at Gamescom 2013

The alpha test for A Realm Reborn began shortly after the original release's finale and ended in late December 2012. During this period, Wada admitted that the development of A Realm Reborn was a cause of delay for many Square Enix titles at the time. Yoshida published an updated roadmap for the beta test through launch, indicating four phases of beta beginning in mid-February 2013. He claimed that the team is "adamant the game not be released until it is ready" and that launching too early "would be like at the level of destroying the company". In May 2013, Square Enix announced the release date for the game, along with details about pre-order bonuses and the collector's edition, which includes an art book, a bonus disc with a recap of the original release story, a soundtrack sampler, and several cosmetic in-game items. In June, the company revealed a PlayStation 4 version was in development and due for release in 2014. Early access began on August 24, with players able to play continuously through to the August 27 launch. Players throughout this period noted continued server issues. Due to an "overwhelmingly positive response", the servers could not handle the number of concurrent players, prompting Square Enix to temporarily suspend digital sales of the game. In light of these issues, Yoshida issued an apology to fans for the game's "rocky" launch and reassured them that fixes were in progress and new servers would be created. A week after launch, the game received a ten-hour maintenance and fresh patches, and all players were compensated with a week of free play time.

A Steam version of the client was released on February 14, 2014. A beta for the PlayStation 4 version of Final Fantasy XIV: A Realm Reborn debuted on the same day as the Japanese release of the console, February 22 the same year. Owners of the PlayStation 3 client were able upgrade to the digital PlayStation 4 client for free. A free trial of the game first became available for PC on July 31, with PlayStation 3 and 4 versions following in December. It initially limited prospective players to content under level 35 but this was expanded to level 60 in August 2020, allowing free access to all of A Realm Reborn and Heavensward with no time restrictions, and was expanded again in October 2023 to include Stormblood and most content up to level 70. The free trial was expanded further in April 2026, adding the Shadowbringers expansion and most associated content up to level 80, including Viera and Hrothgar as playable races. The Chinese version, published and administrated by Shanda Games, premiered on August 29, featuring content through patch 2.16. It features separate servers from the other language versions of the game and a pay-per-hour micropayment billing system. The Korean version, distributed by Actoz Soft, launched in South Korea on August 14, 2015, with content from patch 2.2. This version carries a flexible subscription model with increments as low as 5 hours, similar to the Chinese release, up to 90 days, much like the traditional monthly payment plan. With the release of later patches, versions and expansion packs, the "A Realm Reborn" subtitle has been dropped, with the remade game being referred to simply as Final Fantasy XIV. Fans now refer to the story arc encompassing up to the last patch as "2.0" or "A Realm Reborn", to differentiate it from the later expansions.

Coinciding with the launch of the first expansion pack, the macOS client was released on June 23, 2015. The port was handled by TransGaming. On July 3, Square Enix suspended sales of the macOS version because of widespread reports of poor technical performance and offered refunds to those who purchased it. Yoshida observed that the performance issues could be attributed to difficulties in transposing the game from Microsoft's proprietary DirectX graphical rendering libraries to OpenGL as well as a clerical error resulting in publishing the wrong minimum system requirements, both compounded by the hectic work schedule demanded by the release of an expansion pack. After new rounds of testing and optimization, sales of the macOS version resumed on February 23, 2016. In November 2019, Phil Spencer told the press that Microsoft was working with Square Enix to bring the game to Xbox One. No official announcement was made however, with director Naoki Yoshida stating in an October 2021 interview that discussions are "positive", but still ongoing, and that the team is waiting for the right time to provide an update. Around the same time, Yoshida also confirmed to GameSpot that talks with Nintendo were ongoing, in order to also bring the game to Nintendo Switch, remarking that the addition of Xbox and Switch as supported platforms for the game would increase its overall footprint despite its already active userbase, and that they were waiting to ensure they could pass the necessary regulations stipulated by the platform holders involved before providing an update. Instead, a port of the game for Xbox Series X/S was jointly announced by Yoshida and Spencer in July 2023 during that year's North American Fan Festival in Las Vegas alongside the unveiling of the Final Fantasy XIV: Dawntrail expansion. The Xbox versions support faster load times, cross-play and cross-progression with the PlayStation and PC versions using existing subscriptions, while the Series X version is presented at native 4K resolution. A subscription to Microsoft's Xbox Game Pass service is required for online play on the Xbox versions unlike other platforms. An open beta for the Xbox version took place as part of patch 6.5x. The Xbox Series X/S version of the game officially launched on March 21, 2024. A Nintendo Switch 2 version of the game was officially announced alongside the Final Fantasy XIV: Evercold expansion in April 2026 at Final Fantasy XIV Fan Fest 2026 in Anaheim, and is set to have an early access period in July 2026 before going into full service in August. The Switch 2 version has a standalone subscription that is not shared with other platforms, thereby requiring it to be paid for in addition to maintaining an existing Final Fantasy XIV membership to access features such as cross-platform play and progression with other versions of the game. Yoshida claimed that this pricing model emerged from "months of discussion" regarding monetization with Nintendo, and that this arrangement enabled concessions such as not requiring a Nintendo Switch Online subscription to play the game. Existing Final Fantasy XIV users with play time on other platforms were additionally entitled to a 50% discount on the Switch 2 subscription to compensate.

=== Patches and expansions ===
The development team schedules the release of a major update approximately every three months. Each of these free content patches includes a continuation of the main scenario as well as new raids, features, trials, and dungeons. Minor patches that come in between major updates focus on quality of life changes, and are sometimes used to introduce completely new side content. In addition to regular free updates, the game features full expansion packs that add new zones, races, jobs, and premiere a new content cycle. Since the release of these expansions, the original subtitle of A Realm Reborn has come to refer to the portion of the game available at launch, rather than the entirety of Final Fantasy XIV. Patch 5.3 of the Shadowbringers expansion also modifies and streamlines the A Realm Reborn main scenario questline, and patches 6.1 and 6.2 of the Endwalker expansion included further changes to the A Realm Reborn and Heavensward questlines. With patch 6.5 in October 2023, Final Fantasy XIV launched in beta for Xbox Series X and S, with a full launch including the Dawntrail expansion in July 2024.

Patches and expansions
Patch	Title	Release date	Notes
Patches
2.0	A Realm Reborn	August 27, 2013	After the Garlean invasion is routed, a primal's roar interrupts the victory celebrations and the newly minted Warrior of Light is sent to investigate, leading to encounters with more powerful versions of the three previous primals. The Scions discover that the roar originated from a cavern underneath a Garlean Castrum in La Noscea. This complex, dubbed the Binding Coil of Bahamut, was created by a fallen fragment of Dalamud and serves as the most challenging endgame raid. Alphinaud's sister Alisaie accompanies the player through the coil's Allagan defenses to uncover the truth of the Seventh Umbral Calamity. At its nadir, they discover that the roar was issued by Bahamut, who is slowly being regenerated by the coil's internment hulks.
2.1	"A Realm Awoken"	December 16, 2013	"A Realm Awoken" was delayed by one month owing to time needed to fix the launch troubles. Major features of this patch include the addition of Free Company housing, the Wolves' Den PvP arena, and the Labyrinth of the Ancients, the first section of the Crystal Tower 24-player raid series. The Crystal Tower, which had been unearthed by seismic activity during the Seventh Umbral Calamity, represents the pinnacle of Allagan technology and hubris. G'raha Tia, a Sharlayan scholar, leads a team of adventurers through the Labyrinth which surrounds the tower itself to discover a way inside. Nero tol Scaeva, who had escaped the fall of the Praetorium, secretly follows them in hopes of stealing the massive power source at the top of the tower.
2.2	"Through the Maelstrom"	March 27, 2014	This patch opens the Second Coil of Bahamut raid where Alisaie and the Warrior of Light encounter the shade of Nael van Darnus, who had been slain by the heroes of the Sixth Astral Era at the twilight of the Calamity. Bahamut had ensorcelled her to do his bidding, urging the Meteor Project to fruition in life and to defend the coils in death. Upon van Darnus' defeat, the party discovers that Louisoix has also been tempered by Bahamut and will block future attempts to disable the internment hulks. Other new features of this patch include gardening, the ability to project glamours onto gear, and the Saga of the Zodiac Weapons, a questline to empower the relic weapons.
2.3	"Defenders of Eorzea"	July 8, 2014	The main features of this patch are Frontlines, a large scale PvP battlefield with up to 72 players; the Hunt, a server-wide search for Elite Marks - notorious monsters hidden in the open world that yield currency and upgrade materials when defeated; and Syrcus Tower, the next step of the Crystal Tower raid. Two strangers named Doga and Unei offer to open the sealed door to Syrcus Tower. Nero arrives to protest that only Allagan royals may open the gate. They admit that they are clones of Allagan sages who have been charged with stopping Xande, the mad emperor who was revived with the reemerged tower and seeks to sacrifice the world to the Void in pursuit of immortality. The adventuring party slays Xande and his forces, including the Allagan technologist Amon, (Note: Final Fantasy XIV: Endwalker reveals that this was a clone of the real Amon.) but the Cloud of Darkness refuses to nullify his pact, dragging Doga, Unei, and Nero into her domain as the tower continues to widen the Voidgate.
2.4	"Dreams of Ice"	October 28, 2014	In this patch, Alphinaud joins Alisaie and the player in the Final Coil of Bahamut raid where they confront Bahamut himself, and his tempered thrall Louisoix. Louisoix reveals that the prayers of the Eorzean people transformed him into the primal Phoenix on the eve of the Calamity. The Phoenix struck a fatal blow on Bahamut's physical body at the cost of his life. Not wanting the people of Eorzea to iconize the Phoenix and use his image for further summoning, Louisoix relinquished his primal power and erased the memories of all witnesses. Bahamut, however, clung to life and drew Louisoix's spirit into himself to be regenerated by the coils. Upon Bahamut's defeat, the Leveilleur twins conclude that the truth of the Calamity must never be revealed for fear of the common people summoning Phoenix as a weapon. The other primary feature of this patch is the debut of the Rogue class and Ninja job.
2.5	"Before the Fall"	January 20, 2015; March 31, 2015	Released in two parts, "Before the Fall" concludes the A Realm Reborn storyline and segues into the Heavensward storyline. The first part features the Odin primal battle and the final Crystal Tower raid. Cid engineers a portal which transports G'raha and the party into the World of Darkness to confront the Cloud directly. Doga and Unei reveal that G'raha is the last surviving descendant of the royal Allagan bloodline and thus has the power to break Xande's pact. They sacrifice themselves to allow the party, including Nero, to escape the Void. G'raha, with his newfound ability to control the Crystal Tower, resolves to seal himself inside until mankind can be trusted with its power. Frontlines features a new mode called Slaughter whose objective is defeating other players. A patch between the two parts introduced the Manderville Gold Saucer, a theme park area devoted to the card game Triple Triad, Chocobo racing, and other minigames. The second part consists of quests that conclude the story.
Expansions
3.0	Heavensward	June 23, 2015	The first expansion pack takes players to Ishgard and beyond as they intervene in the Dragonsong War, a thousand-year conflict between man and dragon. The level cap increases to 60, while Dark Knight, Astrologian and Machinist are added as new playable jobs. Au ra was added as a new playable race. Heavensward also coincided with the launch of a native macOS client.
4.0	Stormblood	June 20, 2017	The second expansion pack focuses on liberating the under-siege nations of Ala Mhigo and Doma from the clutches of the Garlean empire. The level cap increases to 70, while Red Mage and Samurai are added as new playable jobs. Blue Mage would also be added later into the expansion's patch cycle as a "Limited Job" with its own specialised content. The Alliance Raid series would be focused on the Ivalice universe seen in Final Fantasy Tactics and Final Fantasy XII. Stormblood also saw the release of the game's first high-end Ultimate difficulty raids. The release of Stormblood marked the end of PlayStation 3 support for Final Fantasy XIV.
5.0	Shadowbringers	July 2, 2019	The third expansion pack, takes players to a new dimension, the First, which is a reflection of the Source, the player's home dimension. Here, players are tasked with restoring darkness to a world drowning in Light as they adopt the mantle of Warrior of Darkness. The level cap increases to 80, while Gunbreaker and Dancer were added as new playable jobs. Viera, as seen in Ivalice games, and Hrothgar, which are based on Ronso from Final Fantasy X were both added as new playable races. The Alliance Raid series would be a crossover with NieR: Automata. To facilitate graphical enhancements, active support for 32-bit Windows operating systems and DirectX 9 rendering libraries ended with Shadowbringers. As of 2026, Shadowbringers and the expansions prior are included in Final Fantasy XIV's free trial.
6.0	Endwalker	December 7, 2021	The fourth expansion pack is the conclusion to the Hydaelyn–Zodiark arc of the story that begun with A Realm Reborn. Players travel to the Near Eastern nation of Radz-at-Han, the secluded and stout nation of Old Sharlayan and take the fight into the heart of the Garlean Empire in Garlemald. The level cap increases to 90, while Sage and Reaper are added as new playable jobs. Male viera were added as a playable race, having previously been limited to female.
7.0	Dawntrail	July 2, 2024	The fifth expansion pack began a new story called the Godless Realms Saga, taking players to the distant western continent of Tural, more commonly known as the New World. The level cap increases to 100, while Viper and Pictomancer were added as new playable jobs. Beastmaster was also added as a second "Limited Job" in the expansion's patch cycle. Female hrothgar were added as a playable race, having previously been limited to male. The Alliance Raid series Echoes of Vana'diel featured plot and detail from Final Fantasy XI. Dawntrail also saw the visuals of the game get an upgrade and in March 2024, Dawntrail was the first expansion to launch on Xbox Series X and S consoles. A Nintendo Switch 2 version was also launched on August 4th, 2026.
8.0	Evercold	February 23, 2027	The sixth expansion pack sees players travel to a new dimension, the Fourth, a world covered in an icy permafrost where the inhabitants have fled to the sky to live on massive magical airships. The level cap increases to 110, while two new jobs will be added including Bastion and Zephyr. The 8-man raid series Beyond the Lifestream will be focused on the world and narrative from the Final Fantasy VII remake trilogy. The Alliance Raid series titled Ghosts of Desire is set to be centred around the Japanese anime series Neon Genesis Evangelion. The battle system is set to receive an alternative playstyle with the original being dubbed Reborn, and the new style being dubbed Evolved. Various graphical updates will also be added including better customisation for faces such as a colour wheel as well as various smaller adjustments. Due to the game's increasing file size and limits on PlayStation 4, Evercold will also mark the end of support for Final Fantasy XIV on the console midway through the expansion.

=== Music ===
Masayoshi Soken contributed to the majority of the game's version of traditional Final Fantasy music, as well as themes original to the game. The enormous track list includes remixed versions of songs such as the Final Fantasy theme, originally composed by long time Final Fantasy composer Nobuo Uematsu, as well as remixes of day and night themes original to Final Fantasy XIV. For the reboot A Realm Reborn, Soken was tasked with composing and compiling numerous original and remixed songs, in addition to his duties as sound director. The remaining tracks were reused pieces from the original game's soundtrack which was principally composed by Nobuo Uematsu, with assistance from Soken, Tsuyoshi Sekito, and Naoshi Mizuta. Yoshida directed Soken to "give us something straightforward that anyone could identify as Final Fantasy, with an easy-to-understand, expressive orchestral sound". Because of the abbreviated development schedule, Soken focused primarily on creating the soundtrack while his team worked on the various sound effects for the game world. The team was given less than a year on sound production, though according to Soken, it felt like "enough work for two full games in that time". Most of the tracks had specific guidelines or came from the development team's requests, though Soken was allowed to "do what [he liked]" for Titan's battle theme, although the initial lyrics had to be changed for having too much profanity. Soken sang the vocal work for some tracks, such as the battle theme for Leviathan. Soken also arranged pieces from earlier Final Fantasy games for use in special in-game events. In Final Fantasy, its music acts as a carrier of nostalgic emotions, allowing the music to bring its nostalgic emotional carrier into new relationships and environments and create a deeper connection with the game.

Final Fantasy XIV: A Realm Reborn Original Soundtrack is a collection of music from the game including both the launch and tracks from Patch 2.1, "A Realm Awoken". It was released on March 21, 2014, on Blu-ray Disc and features 119 tracks with accompanying gameplay videos. The first print run came with a special "Wind-up Bahamut" in-game pet. Emily McMillan of Video Game Music Online called the soundtrack a "truly fantastic score", and said that it was superior to the music of the original version of the game. She felt that it was an excellent merging of the traditional Final Fantasy musical style with a modern orchestral score. Mike Salbato of RPGFan also praised the album, saying that it was his favorite album of 2014 and that he "can't recommend A Realm Reborn's soundtrack highly enough". Final Fantasy XIV: A Realm Reborn Original Soundtrack debuted at position #10 on the Japanese Oricon album charts for its release week and remained in the charts for eight weeks.

In addition to album feedback, critics of the game praised the score in their reviews. Kotaku's Mike Fahey stated that the music was "wonderful, complex and satisfying". He often paused to remove the ambient and interface sound effects so as to hear it better. GamesRadar's Adam Harshberger called it "a standout even amongst Final Fantasy's storied heritage" and Digital Spy's Mark Langshaw called it "a sonic feast ... that pays appropriate homage to the long-running RPG series". The soundtrack won Video Game Music Online's 2013 Annual Game Music Awards in the Eastern category. In 2017, Guinness World Records awarded Final Fantasy XIV for having the most original pieces of music in a video game at nearly 400.

== Mobile version ==
On November 20, 2024, Square Enix announced that an adaptation of the game for iOS and Android devices, Final Fantasy XIV Mobile, was in development. According to game director Naoki Yoshida, the game will be "a sister to FFXIV, aiming to recreate the [...] original's story and combat mechanics on mobile devices." Final Fantasy XIV Mobile is developed by Square Enix and Tencent subsidiary LightSpeed Studios. Its initial playtesting phase will begin in China, followed by a worldwide release. According to Famitsu, Final Fantasy XIV Mobile will be free-to-play and will not include gacha mechanics. It will initially feature nine battle jobs, five races (Hyur, Elezen, Lalafell, Miqo'te and Roegadyn) and cover the base game of Final Fantasy XIV, A Realm Reborn.

The game was first released in China under the name Final Fantasy XIV: Crystal World on June 19, 2025. On July 17, 2026, Tencent announced it would be closing Final Fantasy XIV: Crystal World on September 30, 2026. Furthermore, plans for a global release would also be scrapped.

== Reception ==
Reception

Aggregate score
Aggregator	Score
Metacritic	PC: 83/100; PS3: 78/100; PS4: 86/100

Review scores
Publication	Score
Famitsu	39/40
GameSpot	7.0/10
GamesRadar+	4.5/5
IGN	8.6/10
Polygon	9/10
USgamer	5/5

In contrast to the original version, Final Fantasy XIV has earned a generally positive reception and robust sales numbers. Prior to release, both the game's press and fans were surprised by its quality and level of polish. IGN's Charles Onyett cited many specific improvements over aspects of the initial game and recognized that "it seems like Square's doing the right things to fix the many mistakes made with Final Fantasy XIV's original design". Following an impressive showing at Gamescom 2012, it won Destructoid's Gamescom Community Choice Award. The editorial staff observed "the considerable changes made to the engine, HUD and combat system, transforming it into a far cry from the game that disappointed so many". However, GameSpot's Jonathan Toyad was less confident about the game, praising the changes but commenting that many features would seem overly familiar to players of modern MMORPGs.

The overwhelming sentiment expressed by multiple reviewers was that the remade game executed admirably on traditional MMORPG features and succeeded at addressing the failures of the original version. For Kevin VanOrd of GameSpot, this steadfast implementation of genre fundamentals was his greatest criticism—that "it does not leap over the shoulders of the games that have come before". However, he was quick to praise the quality of the game's writing, a feature highlighted by a number of other critics. USgamer's Pete Davison was particularly enamored with the story and commended the responsiveness of non-player characters to the player's actions as an effective method of worldbuilding. Many reviewers enjoyed the ability to play as multiple classes on a single character, a feature retained from the original release. Davison remarked that the differing mechanics of each class made them feel unique in their gameplay styles.

The console versions of the game were noted for their robust feature set which put them on the same level as the PC release. Phil Kollar of Polygon lauded its implementation of controller play, calling it "Final Fantasy XIV's single biggest gift to the [MMORPG] genre". While the PlayStation 3 version suffered from minor framerate and loading time issues as well as reduced graphical fidelity, reviewers observed that all of these problems were eliminated in the PlayStation 4 version, creating parity with the PC release. Kollar and Leif Johnson of IGN also found that the game played admirably on PlayStation Vita via Remote Play with only minor lag.

Overall, critics were satisfied with A Realm Reborn's incremental improvements. Adam Harshberger of GamesRadar compared it to a "buffet dinner [with] everyone's favorite meal", forgiving the lack of innovation. VanOrd likened the game to the "old world" of MMORPGs, safe and familiar. Johnson and Davison both saw the new version as a solid foundation for future content to be added in patches and expansions. For Kollar, it was a return to form, "the first Final Fantasy game in years to capture the energy and joy that made me fall in love with the series". Motoki Shinohara of Famitsu concluded that "I'm really glad that I'm back home in Eorzea".

=== Sales and subscriptions ===
By the end of the first week of release, the PlayStation 3 version of the game placed second in Japan's sales charts, with 184,000 physical copies sold. In late October 2013, the game had one and a half million registrations. It was the 16th best selling PC game of 2013 in the United States. In Japan, the PlayStation 3 version was ranked 32 in sales, with 244,574 retail copies sold. Following an extremely poor fiscal year 2013, Square Enix executives commended the game's sales and subscriptions for their role in returning the company to profitability in 2014. Yoshida has repeatedly emphasized that the robust success of A Realm Reborn was due to its traditional monthly subscription model. He sees the free-to-play model as an unreliable source of income predicated on devoting a lot of development resources to monthly consumable or cosmetic items in order to maintain profitability, leaving little time for higher quality story and battle content. He also disclosed that over 80% of players are satisfied with the subscription model and theorized that this is due to players' confidence in a steady stream of quality content because of their subscription. With the traditional model, the player base grows over time as people see the game expand, unlike a free-to-play game which can boast a huge initial player base which changes dramatically in size and revenue from month to month. Yoshida has no plans to change to a free-to-play model in the near future.

The game had over 14 million registered players by August 2018, which had increased to more than 22 million by April 2021. In the leadup to the release of the fourth expansion Endwalker, Square Enix revealed that registered player numbers had reached over 24 million and that Final Fantasy XIV itself was now the most profitable Final Fantasy series game to date. The lifetime number of registered players increased to 30 million by January 2024, six months ahead of the game's fifth expansion Dawntrail.

In Japan, Shadowbringers sold approximately 22,260 physical copies for the PlayStation 4 during its launch week in July 2019.

=== Accolades ===
Final Fantasy XIV: A Realm Reborn rated well among many "Game of the Year" lists in the enthusiast press. It was named Best MMO of the year by Game Informer, ZAM, and Joystiq's Massively. AbleGamers honored it as the most accessible mainstream game of the year for 2013. RPGFan named it not only the best MMO of 2013, but also Game of the Year. Players awarded the game Reader's Choice at both ZAM and Game Informer. At industry award shows, A Realm Reborn earned the Special Award at the 2013 PlayStation Awards and the Award for Excellence at the CESA's 2014 Japan Game Awards.

Stormblood won the award for "Best MMO" at Game Informer's Best of 2017 Awards, while it came in second place for the same category in their Reader's Choice Best of 2017 awards. The game was also nominated for the "Still Playing" award at the 2017 and 2018 Golden Joystick Awards, and for "Best Expansion" at PC Gamer's 2017 Game of the Year Awards. The game itself was also nominated for "Best Ongoing Game" at the 2019 Game Critics Awards, and for the same category along with "Best Community Support" and "Best RPG" at The Game Awards 2019.

Shadowbringers was nominated for "Best Game Expansion" and "PlayStation Game of the Year" at the 2019 Golden Joystick Awards; for "Role-Playing Game of the Year" at the 23rd Annual D.I.C.E. Awards; and for "Evolving Game" at the 16th British Academy Games Awards, and won the award for "Excellence in Multiplayer" at the 2020 SXSW Gaming Awards, as well as the award for "Best Online Game" at the Famitsu Game Awards 2019.

Endwalker was nominated for "Online Game of the Year" and won for "Role-Playing Game of the Year" at the 25th Annual D.I.C.E. Awards; it later won "Online Game of the Year" at the following year's awards ceremony. It also won "Excellence in Narrative", "Excellence in Original Score" and "Video Game of the Year" at the 2022 SXSW Gaming Awards. It won the Evolving Game award at the 19th British Academy Games Awards, and received a nomination for the same award at the following year's 20th British Academy Games Awards. The game won "Best Ongoing Game" and "Best Community Support" at The Game Awards in 2021 and 2022 and was nominated in both categories in 2023 and 2025.

Dawntrail was nominated for "Best Ongoing Game" and "Best Community Support" at The Game Awards 2024. The game was nominated for those categories again at The Game Awards 2025.

== Related media ==
A miniseries related to the game, titled Final Fantasy XIV: Dad of Light, was released in 2017. A crossover manga with Saki, titled Saki & Final Fantasy XIV, was launched in Japan in January 2021. A second manga series, Final Fantasy XIV: Eorzea Academy, was released in December 2021.

Three lore books, Encyclopaedia Eorzea I - III, were released on October 17, 2016, November 24, 2018, and December 19, 2023 respectively as well as a cookbook featuring recipes for various in-game dishes.
