= Final Fantasy XIV: Heavensward =

2015 Final Fantasy XIV expansion pack

- Japanese collector's edition cover art featuring a Dragoon
- Developer: Square Enix Business Division 5 (Note: now Square Enix Creative Studio III)
- Publisher: Square Enix
- Director: Naoki Yoshida
- Producer: Naoki Yoshida
- Designers: Nobuaki Komoto; Kei Sato
- Programmers: Hideyuki Kasuga; Kiyotaka Akaza
- Artists: Hiroshi Minagawa; Takeo Suzuki; Shinya Ichida
- Writers: Kazutoyo Maehiro; Natsuko Ishikawa; Banri Oda
- Composer: Masayoshi Soken
- Series: Final Fantasy
- Platforms: macOS; Nintendo Switch 2 (Note: Since August 2026); PlayStation 3 (Note: Until June 2017); PlayStation 4; PlayStation 5 (Note: Since May 2021); Windows; Xbox Series X/S (Note: Since March 2024)
- Release: 23 June 2015; 11 years ago
- Genre: MMORPG
- Mode: Multiplayer

Final Fantasy XIV: Heavensward (Note: ファイナルファンタジーXIV: 蒼天のイシュガルド (Fainaru Fantajī Fōtīn: Sōten no Ishugarudo, lit. Final Fantasy XIV: Azure Skies of Ishgard) in Japanese.) is the first expansion pack to Final Fantasy XIV: A Realm Reborn, a massively multiplayer online role-playing game (MMORPG) developed and published by Square Enix for macOS, PlayStation 3, PlayStation 4, and Windows, then later on PlayStation 5, Xbox Series X/S, and Nintendo Switch 2. It was released on June 23, 2015, nearly two years after the debut of A Realm Reborn. Naoki Yoshida served as director and producer and Nobuo Uematsu, who had not worked on the title since the ill-fated 2010 launch of the original Final Fantasy XIV, returned to collaborate with Masayoshi Soken on the soundtrack. The expansion pack was released as a standalone product for current players, as well as an "all-in-one" bundle containing A Realm Reborn and Heavensward. The latter was the only way to access the OS X version of the game, which premiered on the same day as the expansion pack's launch.

Heavensward focuses on a millennium-long conflict known as the Dragonsong War between the Holy See of Ishgard and the dragon horde of Dravania. Players seek asylum in Ishgard after being falsely accused of murder and become involved in efforts to end the war. These actions uncover an ancient conspiracy concerning the origins of the war. In addition to the new areas, the expansion pack increases the level cap, adds three new character classes and a new playable race, and introduces flying gameplay through the use of airships and other airborne mounts.

Heavensward performed well critically and earned nominations for "Expansion of the Year". By July 2015, the title had reached a cumulative total of five million subscriptions. However, the company suspended sales of the OS X version of the client that same month due to numerous reports of poor technical performance and offered refunds to those who purchased it. OS X sales resumed in February 2016. As with A Realm Reborn, major content patches were scheduled for every three months, though the first one—"As Goes Light, So Goes Darkness"—was delayed to November 10 the same year, to give the development team a break after shipping the expansion.

== Gameplay ==
The gameplay and quest structure of Heavensward largely match that of its base game. As with many massively multiplayer online role-playing game (MMORPGs), players interact with each other in a persistent world that responds to their actions. The biggest change to the combat is an increase of the level cap to level 60, which allows each fighting class to learn new abilities that significantly modify the flow of battle. Three new job classes are introduced as well—the abyssal tank Dark Knight, the gun-toting Machinist, and the star-powered healer Astrologian. These jobs begin at level 30 with their own storylines connected to the new setting, requiring access to the city of Ishgard in order to unlock their questlines.

Heavensward features new areas which are about three times as large as zones in A Realm Reborn. The reason for the size increase is to accommodate flying gameplay. After completing certain quests and attuning to the air currents in an area, players gain the ability to use new flying mounts, such as airships, in that location. Flying allows access to previously unreachable points in the terrain. Airships built by player-run guilds also have the ability to explore floating islands for rare materials, as well as the Diadem—an open world area where players can challenge large monsters for high level gear and spoils.

In addition to new dungeons and raids, Heavensward introduces three new player versus player (PvP) modes. The Feast is an updated four-versus-four arena in the Wolves' Den in which players attempt to defeat other players to collect their medals. The team with the most medals at the end of the match wins. Unlike the Fold of A Realm Reborn, players respawn automatically in this mode and item boxes appear periodically around the arena which provide offensive and defensive advantages to the team that breaks them open. Players who maintain a high rank in the Feast are awarded with unique gear and trophies at the end of a season. An unranked version also exists for new players which features eight-versus-eight combat. The remaining new modes are for 24-player alliances to confront other Grand Companies. Seal Rock (Seize) is a capture the flag-style mode in which players must occupy and defend randomly spawning resource nodes from other teams. The Fields of Glory (Shatter) involves destroying objects around the battlefield for points.

== Plot ==
=== Setting and characters ===
Heavensward takes place on Hydaelyn, a fictional planet with diverse Earth-like climates, focused on the isolationist Holy See of Ishgard, in the snowy mountains of Coerthas. Ishgard is the northernmost part of the primary gameplay region, Eorzea. The three Eorzean Alliance nations—Gridania, Limsa Lominsa, and Ul'dah—and the Garlean Empire also appear. The Ascians, immortal servants of the dark god Zodiark, continue their machinations. Flight permits players to explore the dragon homeland of Dravania and islands floating above the Abalathia's Spine mountains. In Dravania, the abandoned and ruined Sharlayan colony has become Idyllshire, a free, democratic city founded by goblins.

Heavensward's primary conflict concerns the millennial Dragonsong War between Ishgard and Nidhogg's draconic horde. Ishgardian orthodoxy claims Halone, their goddess, commanded King Thordan build a city in Abalathia's Spine. This angered the great wyrm Nidhogg, who confronted Thordan and his knights twelve. Though he and several knights were slain, Thordan's son Haldrath took up his father's spear, carving out Nidhogg's eye. Nidhogg fled, his eye becoming an Ishgardian relic, granting its volatile power to a line of Azure Dragoons. Nidhogg has since continuously besieged Ishgard and her people. The Ishgardian Archdiocese, currently led by Archbishop Thordan VII, promulgates these claims as holy doctrine.

The unending war makes Ishgard isolationist in both policy and everyday demeanor; they withdrew from the first Eorzean Alliance and ignored the second, preoccupied with the Dragonsong War. It also manifests in their fanatical devotion to Halone and persecution of "heretics"—those who support dragons. Just prior to Heavensward, Nidhogg awakens, calling his brood to active invasion once again. The player's character, the Warrior of Light, befriends Haurchefaunt Greystone of House Fortemps for foiling a heretic plot, as well as Ser Aymeric, Lord Commander of the Temple Knights, after defending against a Dravanian assault. After being betrayed during a coup in Ul'dah, the Warrior seeks asylum from the charge of regicide alongside Alphinaud and Tataru, the only other Scions to safely escape. Nidhogg's roar prompts changes to both factions in the war; Aymeric and Count Edmont of House Fortemps open Ishgard to foreign assistance against the dragons, while Lady Iceheart grows her band of heretics seeking reconciliation. Estinien, the current Azure Dragoon, returns to hunt down Nidhogg.

=== Story ===
After the bloody banquet in Ul'dah, Haurchefaunt persuades his father, Count Edmont Fortemps, to offer asylum to the remaining Scions. The Warrior assists Edmont's sons, and they encounter Lady Iceheart, who regrets the deaths in her recent assault. Returning to Ishgard, the Warrior finds Alphinaud and Tataru accused of heresy by the Heavens' Ward, Archbishop Thordan VII's honor guard. Requesting trial by combat, Tataru chooses the Warrior as her champion, and they secure victory. Thordan apologizes, and reveals to the Warrior that he intends to double-cross the Ascians.

Raubahn is imprisoned, awaiting execution for the Sultana's poisoning, but the Scions free him. They defeat the Crystal Braves in so doing, but their leader Ilberd escapes. They learn from Lolorito that the Sultana lives: he subverted Adeledji's plot, swapping the poison for a sleep draught. Lolorito gives the antidote to Raubahn, who spares him and aids Nanamo in returning to rule.

Alphinaud, the Warrior and Estinien entreat Iceheart to seek peace with Nidhogg. Iceheart reveals she also has the Echo, which showed her the truth of the war. Born Ysayle, she took the name Iceheart after communing with Saint Shiva, who brokered two centuries of peace between man and dragon through her romance with Nidhogg's brother, Hraesvelgr. Ysayle agrees to cease her extremist methods and help them find Hraesvelgr. After defeating the primal Ravana and slaying Nidhogg's consort, the group finds Hraesvelgr, who reveals the "Shiva" Ysayle communes with is just a primal she created.

Hraesvelgr speaks of Midgardsormr's arrival on the star. Of his seven children, Hraesvelgr, Ratatoskr, and Nidhogg settled in Eorzea. Nidhogg distrusted mortals after ancient Allag slew Bahamut and imprisoned Tiamat. Shiva had Hraesvelgr devour her, so their souls would be linked forever. The ensuing peace ended when King Thordan I and his knights murdered Ratatoskr, consuming her eyes for power. Nidhogg, in his fury, slew King Thordan, swearing vengeance on his descendants. Hraesvelgr rejects peace, judging Nidhogg's cause just. Out of options, Estinien and the Warrior storm Nidhogg's lair, slay him, and take his remaining eye. The Warrior learns that this eye is in fact Hraesvelgr's: Haldrath gouged out both of Nidhogg's eyes, only one of which became the Azure Dragoons' source of power, and Hraesvelgr saved Nidhogg's life by giving him one of his own eyes.

After the Warrior returns Hraesvelgr's eye to him, Ysayle leaves to dissuade her followers, and the Warrior returns to Ishgard to share the truth. However, the Archbishop and church leaders already know, and imprison Aymeric for attempting to reveal it. Lucia and the Temple Knights rescue him. The Warrior and Haurchefaunt try to arrest Thordan, but Haurchefaunt is killed shielding the Warrior from a Heavens' Ward ambush. Swearing vengeance, the Warrior and Alphinaud pursue Thordan, who has left for Azys Lla, an ancient Allagan floating colony. Cid and the Enterprise help defeat the primal Bismarck, who held the key to Azys Lla, but the Ascian Igeyorhm steals it. Blocked by Azys Lla's protection field, the Scions turn back and rescue Y'shtola, trapped in the Lifestream during the escape from Ul'dah. She directs them to her mentor Matoya. With her aid, the group breaches Azys Lla's barrier.

The Garlean Empire's new flagship followed the Warrior of Light in hopes of looting Allagan technology, opening fire on the Enterprise. Ysayle, having acquired Hraesvelgr's aid, intervenes, sacrificing herself so the Enterprise can land on Azys Lla. There lie imprisoned the Warring Triad, a trio of ancient primals, and Tiamat. Thordan intends to absorb the Triad's power and conquer Eorzea. The Warrior converses with Tiamat and Midgardsormr, who restores Hydaelyn's blessing. The Warrior kills Igeyorhm and defeats Lahabrea. Thordan arrives, absorbing Nidhogg's other eye and the weakened Lahabrea, and transforms into the primal King Thordan. Despite their combined power, Thordan and the Heavens' Ward are slain by the Warrior.

Estinien prepares to seal Nidhogg's eyes, but Nidhogg's lingering spirit possesses him, reforming his body and escaping. The Warrior's group returns to Ishgard, where Midgardsormr warns that Nidhogg will return. As Thordan's illegitimate son, Aymeric becomes acting ruler, and Ishgard rejoins the Alliance. In a post-credits scene, the Ascians' losses lead Elidibus to recruit the "Warriors of Darkness".

==== Dragonsong ====
The revelation of Ishgard's origins splinters the citizenry into populist factions supporting Aymeric and denialists supported by Thordan's allies. As Nidhogg prepares to strike again, Aymeric attempts diplomatic relations with Dravania, proposing a meeting with Hraesvelgr's daughter Vidofnir. The Scions reunite with Thancred, who had been lost after escaping from Ul'dah, and clash with the Warriors of Darkness, revealed to be a band of adventurers. The party returns to find Thordan's allies staging a revolt. The Warrior of Light aids the Temple Knights in a raid on the insurgents' stronghold, during which the ringleader almost kills a hostage child. Vidofnir, who had come to warn Ishgard of Nidhogg's movements, saves the child, impressing onlookers.

The Scions deduce that Hydaelyn transported Minfilia away from Ul'dah. Crossing into the aetherial sea, the Warrior learns that Minfilia gave up her soul to Hydaelyn, becoming her avatar. Hydaelyn explains that her battle with the Ascians' God, Zodiark, split the planet into thirteen reflections. The Ascians have so far orchestrated seven calamities to merge each shard into Zodiark and weaken Hydaelyn, which necessitated Minfilia's sacrifice. In Ishgard, Aymeric is opposed by Ishgardians who want vengeance against Dravania. To boost Ishgardian unity, Aymeric organizes joint military exercises with the Eorzean Alliance. At the conference, Vidofnir agrees to peace with Ishgard, but Nidhogg returns and assault her; he promises Ishgard's total annihilation in his next assault.

Alphinaud, the Warrior and Aymeric go to Hraesvelgr for assistance in saving Estinien. After enduring his trials, they convince Hraesvelgr to help, as Nidhogg launches his final assault. Hraesvelgr fights Nidhogg, but is defeated; he passes on his eye to the Warrior of Light, allowing them to defeat Nidhogg. The Warrior and Alphinaud remove Nidhogg's eyes from Estinien's armor and cast them into the Sea of Clouds, saving Estinien and destroying Nidhogg for good. The horde retreats in disarray, ending the war. A recovering Estinien relinquishes his title as Azure Dragoon and departs. Aymeric establishes a parliamentary democracy in Ishgard led by lowborn and highborn citizens, represented by the House of Commons and House of Lords, of which he is elected as chairman. Ishgard celebrates the war's end.

==== The Warriors of Darkness and the Griffin ====
Alisaie, Alphinaud's twin sister, arrives injured at House Fortemps. She was attacked by the Warriors of Darkness, having overheard Elidibus telling them of his plot to trigger an arms race of primal summoning. In another run-in with the Scions, the Warriors reveal that Elidibus promised to help save their shard, the First, from a "Flood of Light" that has nearly destroyed it, in exchange for their help. Tracking down another lead among Ala Mhigan refugees, the Scions are reunited with Yda and Papalymo, who have joined the Resistance efforts against the Garlean Empire. They have grown suspicious of a faction led by the mysterious Griffin. The Griffin's decoy points the party to a summoning of Ifrit, where they fight the Warriors of Darkness. One of them reveals himself as the Scion Urianger, playing double agent. He invokes a ritual to gain an audience with Minfilia. At Urianger's suggestion, she accompanies the Warriors of Darkness to their home world to try to save the First. Meanwhile, Elidibus hands over Nidhogg's eyes (which the Warriors retrieved) to the Griffin.

The Griffin leads an attack on Baelsar's Wall, the Garlean base dividing the Black Shroud and occupied Ala Mhigo. The Scions intervene and discover that the Griffin is Ilberd, who intends to provoke a Garlean counterattack so that Eorzea will be forced to liberate Ala Mhigo, his homeland. Using Nidhogg's eyes and the prayers of his dying soldiers, Ilberd kills himself to create the primal Shinryu to destroy the Empire. Papalymo sacrifices himself, using an ancient sealing ritual to stall the uncontrollable Shinryu. The Scions awaken the ancient Allagan war-machine Omega, which battles Shinryu, ending with both being apparently destroyed. With the seal gone, Papalymo's last spell also fades—an enchanted tattoo used to disguise Yda, who reveals herself as Yda's sister Lyse; the real Yda had died fighting in the Resistance and Lyse took up her name to preserve her memory. Lyse renews her resolve to fight for Ala Mhigan independence. With Baelsar's Wall captured, the Alliance and the Scions prepare for the Empire's inevitable response.

== Development ==
Planning for Heavensward, along with the patches leading into its story, began well over a year prior to its announcement. Naoki Yoshida, the game's producer and director, considered the expansion to be a "sink or swim" moment for the Final Fantasy XIV project, its success or failure determining the arc of the game's legacy. For theme, he decided between "Sea" and "Sky", ultimately settling on "Sky, dragons, and knights". The progression from the main game to its expansion was laid out in detail and these elements were categorized so that developers would not get confused between patch content and expansion content which were being created simultaneously. They chose Ishgard as the setting because it was teased in the original 2010 version of Final Fantasy XIV and lent itself well to the gothic fantasy story they wanted to tell. The development team worked within the constraints of existing backstory and assets for Ishgard and elaborated on them. This includes a fictional language for the dragons which Michael-Christopher Koji Fox, the director of English localization, had created during the development of the 2010 release. The expansion was announced at the Las Vegas segment of Final Fantasy XIV Fan Festival 2014, which took place in October. Further details about the expansion were released at the London and Tokyo events, including the three new jobs, the new playable race, and the new raid. Yoshida also revealed a data center based in Europe to improve server performance for European players, as well as a service providing optional cosmetic items for purchase.

Unlike A Realm Reborn, the Heavensward storyline is an original story not directly inspired by previous Final Fantasy titles. Instead, it draws influence from real events such as religion-based conflicts around the world and the importance of recognizing the perspective that history is written from. The team chose to require new players to complete the A Realm Reborn story before accessing Heavensward because it provides necessary context for the player's actions. Yoshida referred to Heavenward as "the second season to a television program", remarking "you don't watch it from the second season, you watch it from the first season so you know what's going on". The team made adjustments to allow new players to "watch that first season on fast-forward", including increasing experience point gain and adding gear rewards to main scenario quests, alleviating the need to grind to access the expansion. For future expansions, Yoshida said that previous story completion will not be a requirement.

Heavensward premiered the OS X client at its launch on June 23, 2015. The port was handled by TransGaming. Unlike console and Windows PC versions of the expansion, the OS X release was initially only available in a two-in-one bundle containing the base game and the Heavensward expansion, titled Final Fantasy XIV Online. Current players of other versions of the game, including Apple PC players running the Windows PC install via Boot Camp, needed to purchase this bundle to play using the native OS X client. On July 3, Square Enix suspended sales of this version because of widespread reports of poor technical performance and offered refunds to those who purchased it. Yoshida attributed the performance problems to difficulties in transposing the game from Microsoft's proprietary DirectX graphical rendering libraries to OpenGL as well as a clerical error resulting in publishing the wrong minimum system requirements, both compounded by the hectic work schedule demanded by the release of an expansion pack. After new rounds of testing and optimization, sales of the OS X client resumed on February 23, 2016, accompanying the release of Patch 3.2.

Another major focus of the expansion is to update the game with DirectX 11 support. The DirectX 11 version of the game includes improvements to water physics, light refraction in water, reflections, and visual quality of shadows and textures over the DirectX 9 client. In addition, the new client is less resource-intensive on the graphical processing unit and may improve frame rates. However, there are no current plans to upgrade to DirectX 12. For consoles, the development team committed to maintaining support for the PlayStation 3 client through the end of the Heavensward patch cycle.

Two new categories of content were introduced during the patch cycle of Heavensward, post-launch: Exploratory Missions and Deep Dungeon. Exploratory Missions are designed to emulate the feel of "first generation" MMORPGs in which players would hunt notorious monsters in the field with hidden spawn conditions. It also fills a gap in the game's content repertoire for huge-scale battles with extremely large numbers of players. It was not well received at launch because of the simplicity of its battle mechanics, the repetitive nature of the gameplay loop, and the randomness of the loot drops which were not tied to skill or effort spent. Deep Dungeon is a roguelike randomly generated instance, inspired by Chocobo's Mysterious Dungeon. Yoshida wanted to allow veteran players to party with their friends who are just starting out more quickly; as such, characters are temporarily reset to level one upon entering and level quickly back to the maximum over the course of the first 50 floors. The first section is considered casual content but reaching the 200th floor is intended as a challenge for hardcore players.

=== Patch history ===
The development team schedules the release of a major update approximately every three months. Each of these free content patches includes a continuation of the main scenario as well as new raids, features, trials, and dungeons. Minor patches that come in between major updates focus on quality of life improvements. As with A Realm Reborn, Square Enix released five major patches for Heavensward over the course of its two-year content cycle. The final patches serve as a segue into the story of the second expansion, Stormblood.

Patches and expansions
| Patch | Title | Release date | Notes |
|---|---|---|---|
| 3.0 | Heavensward | June 23, 2015 | Weekly limited content was not made available on the expansion's launch day in order to allow players to enjoy the story at their own pace. The Alexander: Gordias raid debuted two weeks post-launch with a Savage difficulty mode released two weeks after that. The multiple difficulty settings are intended to allow regular players to experience the raid story while maintaining the challenge for dedicated players. In this storyline, a secret society of goblins called the Illuminati have summoned the spirit of the primal Alexander into an enormous robot that had been submerged under the lake in the Dravanian Hinterlands. The massive primal threatens to drain the region of aether, prompting the Scions to act. The player joins a treasure hunter named Mide on a mission to infiltrate Alexander and steal the Enigma Codex, which is the Illuminati's key to controlling the mechanical beast. |
| 3.1 | "As Goes Light, So Goes Darkness" | November 10, 2015 | After shipping the expansion, Yoshida postponed the first patch to prevent burnout among the development team. In the Shadow of Mhach, 24 players accompany the Redbills, a band of Sky Pirates led by Leofard, in search of treasure on the Void Ark, a ghostly floating fortress that has been spotted around the Sea of Clouds. The crew encounter Diabolos, who aims to free the voidsent queen Scathach from her prison on the ark. The ark's guardian, Cait Sith, explains the ship's origins as a vessel to weather the floods of the Sixth Umbral Era, as well as the dangers posed by Scathach's liberation. The Diadem is a new area of the Sea of Clouds where many parties can challenge notorious monsters for gear and spoils. The patch also features an "Extreme" difficulty version of the final boss, King Thordan. Finally, Lord of Verminion is a real-time strategy-style minigame at the Gold Saucer in which players battle each other using collectable minions. It is based on an April Fools' Day joke parodying Lord of Vermilion. |
| 3.2 | "The Gears of Change" | February 23, 2016 | The main feature of this patch is the Alexander: Midas raid. Traveling up Alexander's second arm, the player manages to defeat the Illuminati leader Quickthinx Allthoughts, recover the Enigma Codex, and disable the second of Alexander's three power cores. However, a strange phenomenon reverses time, restoring both cores and returning Alexander to full power with Quickthinx at the helm. On another front, the seal on the Warring Triad—a trio of ancient primals of immense power—begins to weaken, prompting the Scions to attempt to defeat them one by one. The first is Sephirot, the Fiend, the primal of a tree-like race with the power to enhance its own growth. The patch also introduces the Feast, a ranking-based player-versus-player arena. Lastly, the patch adds a pair of systems designed to help new players: the Hall of the Novice, which provides basic training exercises for each type of battle role; and the Mentor System, which allows veteran players to join a dedicated chat channel to give advice to novices. |
| 3.3 | "Revenge of the Horde" | June 7, 2016 | This patch concludes the "Dragonsong War" storyline, ending with the defeat of Nidhogg, who serves as the update's boss trial. The Shadow of Mhach raids continue with the Weeping City of Mhach, in which the Redbills travel to the abandoned city in pursuit of Diabolos. There, they find the Nullstone, an ancient artifact with the power to banish any voidsent, which Cait Sith hopes to use on Scathach in the event of her inevitable release. This patch also adds two new types of dungeon content. The Aquapolis is a dungeon that relies on chance to spawn and progress, rewarding rare materials to the lucky. The Palace of the Dead is a roguelike multi-floor dungeon in which players start at level one and power up with items found within the dungeon. Finally, the Fields of Glory (Shatter) is a new alliance-scale PvP mode. |
| 3.4 | "Soul Surrender" | September 27, 2016 | The 8-man raid story culminates in this patch with Alexander: The Creator. Quickthinx attempts to engage Alexander's time-warping abilities to rewrite history according to the Illuminati's plan. Cid determines that the goblin leader's preternatural predictions are a result of reading a journal from the present day left behind when the party travels back in time to witness Alexander's first summoning three years prior. After defeating Alexander Prime, Mide sacrifices herself to join her lover's soul inside the primal's core, which traps it in a single moment in time, safe from the world. Meanwhile, Sophia, the Goddess, is the second of the Warring Triad to break free from Allagan fetters. The patch also expands The Palace of the Dead to a depth of 200 floors, introduces a soldier management system in the form of Grand Company Squadrons, and addresses the lack of housing availability with apartment housing. |
| 3.5 | "The Far Edge of Fate" | January 17, 2017 | Released in multiple parts, this patch takes players to the border of Ala Mhigo both literally and politically. The Shadow of Mhach raids conclude with Dun Scaith, where Diabolos steals the Nullstone from Cait Sith. On this floating island, intended as a Sixth Umbral Era refuge, the adventurers' alliance confronts and defeats Scathach. However, Diabolos consumes her corpse to gain her tremendous void power. Cait Sith manages to pilfer the Nullstone and uses it to banish Diabolos once and for all. Finally, the Scions collaborate with Garlean Legatus Regula van Hydrus to challenge the last and most powerful member of the Warring Triad, Zurvan, the Demon. Regula shields his temporary allies from a mortal blow, bidding the Scions to protect the world from the primal scourge as he lay dying. Satellite patches include a dramatic restructuring of the Diadem to be more objective-based, adding a massive 72+ player boss battle, and an expansion of the Party Finder to allow for cross-server recruitment. An extended crossover with Garo premiered in this patch as well, featuring equipment inspired by the tokusatsu series available through PvP battles. |

=== Music ===
Masayoshi Soken composed the majority of the expansion's score—over 50 tracks—in addition to his duties as sound director. On the other hand, Heavensward marked Nobuo Uematsu's first return to the Final Fantasy series since his work on the original 2010 release of Final Fantasy XIV. Uematsu composed the expansion's main theme, "Dragonsong", and Soken used it as a musical through-line which reappears at multiple points in the story and soundtrack. Susan Calloway, who sang the theme song for the original release, reprised her role for this piece. Soken emphasized the music's connection to the story as important to his composition process, ever focused on enhancing the player's experience through sound. He found that Heavensward's "dark" main story is reflected in the pieces he wrote. Each locale's theme features the instruments that might be played there. Piano was used heavily throughout the soundtrack to add character to the other instruments. Soken's favorite track from Heavensward was "Revenge Twofold", a dungeon theme; it was originally intended for the Nidhogg battle but was repurposed.

Heavensward: Final Fantasy XIV Original Soundtrack is collection of music from the expansion pack including both the launch and Patch 3.1, "As Goes Light, So Goes Darkness". The album was released by Square Enix on February 24, 2016, on Blu-ray Disc and includes a documentary about the sound production process featuring Soken. The first print run also came with a special "Spoony Bard" in-game pet, referring to the character from Final Fantasy IV. Unlike the previous Final Fantasy XIV album, all of the music was new to the album, though 16 of the tracks were previously released in September through November 2015 as Final Fantasy XIV: Heavensward -EP- Vol. 1. through 3. The album was well received by Emily McMillan of Video Game Music Online, who lauded the soundtrack's "brilliant, varied, and extraordinarily fun to hear" themes. She praised the unique atmosphere of the new expansion's music, as well as its integration into the overall game's soundscape. Mike Salbato of RPGFan was impressed by the cohesiveness of the entire soundtrack, owing to the recurrence of motifs from "Heavensward" and "Dragonsong". He also singled out "Night in the Brume" as a graceful, melancholy town theme.

== Reception ==
Reception

Aggregate score
| Aggregator | Score |
|---|---|
| Metacritic | PC: 86/100; PS4: 86/100 |

Review scores
| Publication | Score |
|---|---|
| GameSpot | 9/10 |
| GamesRadar+ | 4.5/5 |
| IGN | 8.6/10 |
| RPGamer | 4.5/5 |
| USgamer | 4.5/5 |
| Digital Spy | 8/10 |
| RPGFan | 95% |

Critics looked to Heavensward as a bellwether for the direction of the Final Fantasy XIV project—if it would continue its comeback story that began with A Realm Reborn or if it would falter and further damage the series. Reception of the expansion was "generally favorable" for both PC and PlayStation 4 versions, according to review aggregator Metacritic, based on 14 and 20 reviews, respectively. Heavensward sold 47,000 units across PlayStation 3 and 4 versions in Japan in its first week, making it the third bestselling video game of the week in that region.

A focal point of praise for the game centered on the story. Pete Davison of GameSpot drew attention to the themes of racism and questioning of religious dogma as well as the dramatic arcs of characters like Ysayle, which he called "among the series' most memorable". Leif Johnson of IGN felt similarly, holding it as "the finest Final Fantasy tale that developer Square Enix has told in a decade". Mike Williams of USgamer took time to acknowledge the care and detail given to the side quests and commended the localization team for conveying their humor.

Many outlets made note of the requirement to finish all A Realm Reborn main story content before being given access to Heavensward. Davison argued that the decision made sense for the story-centric MMORPG and appreciated the adjustment to quests to make this process easier for new players. Daniella Lucas of GamesRadar agreed, saying "to bypass A Realm Reborn would be a disservice to a truly gripping tale". Johnson recognized the necessity of the story-based gate but criticized the decision to lock the new job classes behind it as well.

Reviewers compared the addition of flying gameplay favorably to World of Warcraft: The Burning Crusade. Mike Salbato of RPGFan lauded the choice to lock flying until players had explored each area on foot. Williams echoed this sentiment, observing that it preserves the sense of exploration and wonder in the world. Lucas and Davison were more equivocal about this feature but ultimately agreed with the developers' decision. However, they all agreed the expansive new zones were a highlight of the game, with Adriaan den Ouden of RPGamer impressed by "spectacular vistas that are simply stunning to behold".

Johnson took issue with a particular content gap manifesting toward the latter half of the expansion's leveling progression. Instead of completing a large number of "insipid" filler quests dealing with moogles, he opted to run the later leveling dungeons to overcome this hump. Williams and Salbato experienced a similar slow period during this midgame. Like A Realm Reborn, Heavensward continues the game's strong console feature set and controller support. Lucas maintained that Final Fantasy XIV is the best MMORPG for video game home consoles, though she cautioned that PlayStation 3 players might experience longer load times than on PlayStation 4.

Taken together, the critical response to Heavensward indicate confidence in the game's direction. Mark Langshaw of Digital Spy summarized that "Heavensward feels like a reward for the fans who gave Final Fantasy XIV a second chance after its botched launch in 2010". During the year-end awards cycle, Heavensward won "Best MMO" from RPGFan, Game Informer, and Massively Overpowered. It also earned "Best Expansion" from Hardcore Gamer. The BAFTA Games Awards nominated the title for best "evolving game" in both 2016 and 2017 award years.
