= Dragon Quest: Monster Battle Road =

- Dragon Quest: Monster Battle Road logo
- Genre: Card battle game
- Developers: Rocket Studio, Eighting
- Publisher: Square Enix
- Artist: Akira Toriyama
- Composer: Koichi Sugiyama
- Platforms: Arcade game, Wii
- Original release: JP: June 2007; (Battle Road): JP: September 11, 2009; (Legends): JP: July 15, 2010; (Victory)

Dragon Quest: Monster Battle Road (ドラゴンクエスト モンスターバトルロード, Doragon Kuesutō Monsutā Batoru Rōdo) is a series of Japanese arcade games based on Dragon Quest VIII: Journey of the Cursed King. Players battle monsters and can win real-life cards with monster data imprinted on them. The first game, also titled Dragon Quest: Monster Battle Road, was released in 2007 only in Japan, using the Taito Type X2 system. A sequel, Dragon Quest: Monster Battle Road II Legends, was announced at the 2009 Jump Fiesta in Tokyo, and a third game in the series, Dragon Quest: Monster Battle Road Victory, a port of the Legends game, was announced for the Wii in 2010. Dragon Quest: Monster Battle Road Scanner was scheduled for release in the arcade in 2016.

== Gameplay ==
The games are based around battles with monsters and heroes from the Dragon Quest games. The battles take place in a coliseum and the monsters can be chosen from either the game or cards the player can insert into the machine. The combat is very simple and only uses a two-button system. The machine gives the player a free card at the beginning of a match. These cards can then be used in battle and if the player has one of the rarer cards, a special attack becomes available to be used in battle.

In the Victory game, players must take a photo of their Legends cards with the DSiWare camera or their cell phones, and send it to a virtual album using a separately sold scanning utility. Then, those cards can be used in the Victory game. Cards can also be collected through the game itself. The game added the ability for players to player one-on-one or two-on-two battles, either on the same console or over the internet.

== Development ==
The original Battle Road was developed by Rocket Studio and released in June 2007, while Legends was released in September 2009. Victory was developed by Eighting and released in July 2010. The series has been described as being inspired by the success of Sega's Love 'N Berry card-driven arcade game, and as being aimed towards young children. For Victory, Square Enix released a special Wii controller to tie in with the game. The controller cost ¥12,800 upon release, or around US$150.

== Reception ==
As of March 2008, Dragon Quest: Monster Battle Road had earned ¥4.5 billion. In the following six months, from April to September 2008, the series had contributed additional earnings between ¥1.6 billion and ¥1.7 billion for Square Enix. This is equivalent to a total of $78.2 million in United States dollars, as of September 2008.

As of May 2010, Square Enix had shipped over 200 million player cards for the first two games. Victory sold 136,000 units in its first week, the second-most sold after Fire Emblem: Shin Monshō no Nazo: Hikari to Kage no Eiyū. By the middle of August, the last week it was in the top ten games sold in Japan, it had sold over 220,000 copies.
