= Final Fantasy XIV (2010 video game) =

2010 defunct MMORPG

- North American cover art, featuring artwork of a male Hyur.
- Developer: Square Enix
- Publisher: Square Enix
- Directors: Nobuaki Komoto; Naoki Yoshida (Note: Post-release; from 2010 to 2012)
- Producers: Hiromichi Tanaka; Naoki Yoshida
- Designer: Nobuaki Komoto
- Artist: Akihiko Yoshida
- Writer: Yaeko Sato
- Composers: Nobuo Uematsu; Ryo Yamazaki; Naoshi Mizuta; Tsuyoshi Sekito; Masayoshi Soken
- Series: Final Fantasy
- Engine: Crystal Tools
- Platform: Windows
- Release: September 30, 2010
- Genre: Massively multiplayer online role-playing game
- Mode: Multiplayer

Final Fantasy XIV (Note: (ファイナルファンタジーXIV), also known as Final Fantasy XIV Online) was a 2010 massively multiplayer online role-playing game (MMORPG) for Windows, developed and published by Square Enix. It was the original version of the fourteenth entry in the main Final Fantasy series and the second MMORPG in the series after Final Fantasy XI. Set in the fantasy realm of Eorzea, players take control of a customized avatar as they explore the land and are caught up in both an invasion by the hostile Garlean Empire and the threat of the primals, the deities of the land's beastmen tribes. Eventually, they are embroiled in a plot by a Garlean Legatus to destroy the primals by bringing one of the planet's moons down on Eorzea.

Final Fantasy XIV had been in development since 2005 under the codename "Rapture", and was announced in 2009 for Windows and the PlayStation 3 video game console. It ran on Square Enix's Crystal Tools middleware engine, which was adjusted to suit the game's specifications. During development, the team carried over multiple aesthetic elements from Final Fantasy XI while attempting to create something that stood on its own. Due to several factors, the development was beset by problems that would later have drastic effects on the game. Attempts to bring the game to Xbox 360 consoles fell through due to disagreements with Microsoft about the use of Xbox Live.

After its alpha test and a delayed beta test, the game went live on September 30, 2010, remaining active until its servers were closed on November 11, 2012. At launch, the game was met with a negative response: while the graphics and music were praised, other aspects were unanimously panned, including the gameplay, interface, and the general impression of the game being unfinished. Critic and fan backlash caused Square Enix to suspend subscription fees, indefinitely postpone the PlayStation 3 version, and replace the development team leadership, with Naoki Yoshida brought in as producer and director. Yoshida decided to make marginal improvements before the game's shutdown, ultimately replacing it with a new version initially subtitled A Realm Reborn, which met with a favorable reception upon its release.

== Gameplay ==
Comparison of a levequest battle in the alpha release (above) and the final patched version of Final Fantasy XIV.

Final Fantasy XIV was a massively multiplayer online role-playing game (MMORPG) in which the player controlled a customized Adventurer avatar from one of the five playable races. Each race had two tribes, and all but two allowed for the selection of male or female characters. The avatar could have their eye and hair color, facial features, and skin tone customized, and features such as birthmarks and scars were able to be added. Their chosen tribe, along with their chosen patron deity, affected their stats and elemental attributes. The game's opening varied depending on which starting location was chosen. Two different types of quests were available for players: story quests, which were unlocked as characters accumulated experience points (EXP) and raised their experience level while unlocking new abilities, and Levequests (leves), side quests accessed through the Adventurers' Guilds. Leves were broken down into multiple types, focusing on gathering or combat. Levequests were associated with particular non-playable characters (NPCs). As the player completed leves, they gained favor with three different factions and unlocked new abilities, with rewards only coming from the NPCs within the factions who issued the quest. Gaining favor also unlocked a new type of level called Faction leves, which depleted a character's favor when completed.

Compared to Final Fantasy XI, where party-based gameplay is forefront at all times, the gameplay in XIV was adjusted so that players could go for longer periods without joining a party. There was no auto-attack option, with each action needing a manual input while an enemy was targeted. Each action used up a stamina bar. Through defeating monsters, crafting items, and completing quests, players accumulated EXP which, when a certain threshold was reached, automatically incremented the player's level. The player's level affected attributes such as HP (health/hit points), MP (magic/mana points), and the number of abilities available to them.

Under the Armory System, a character's equipped weapon or crafting tool determined the player's character class, allowing them to switch roles at will. Some classes were associated with a particular starting point. Classes were divided into four disciplines: Disciples of War, masters of physical combat; Disciples of Magic, practitioners of the magical arts; Disciples of the Hand, crafters and handymen who synthesized and repaired items; and Disciples of the Land, gatherers who collected resources from the environment. Certain abilities learned under one class could be equipped and used by other classes. The Job System (a post-launch addition) built upon the Armoury System for Disciples of War and Magic. In exchange for restricting the range of equippable abilities from other classes, players gained access to powerful skills, magic, weapons, and armor exclusive to the Job corresponding to that class. These Jobs, based on the classic Final Fantasy character jobs, were more suited to party-based combat.

== Synopsis ==
=== Setting and characters ===
The story of Final Fantasy XIV takes place in a high fantasy setting. The main location is Eorzea, a geopolitical region on the larger planet Hydaelyn: this contrasts Final Fantasy XI which uses one name to refer to the entire world and its regions. Eorzea is broken up into three main powers: the forest nation of Gridania; the desert-based Ul'dah sultanate; and the thalassocracy of Limsa Lominsa, Eorzea's dominant maritime power. Other important locations include the scholarly city-state of Sharlayan and the Garlean Empire, a hostile northern power with highly developed technology. Five years prior to the start of the game, the Garlean Empire invaded the land of Ala Mhigo, but was prevented from conquering Eorzea by the attacks of the ancient dragon Midgardsormr and his dragon hordes. In response to the Empire's threat, the three nations of Eorzea reformed the Grand Companies, comprehensive centers of command which combine the cities' military and economic assets. The Grand Companies attracted people from all walks of life, who take up the mantle of Adventurers.

The player character is a customizable Adventurer avatar taken from the five main races of Eorzea. The playable races are the human-like Hyur (ヒューラン, Hyūran), the elf-like Elezen (エレゼン, Erezen), the physically-imposing Roegadyn (ルガディン, Rugadin), the diminutive Lalafell (ララフェル, Raraferu), and the feline Miqo'te (ミコッテ, Mikotte). Playable Roegadyn and Miqo'te are gender-locked to male and female respectively. Aside from these races are the beastmen, tribes who worship ancient gods called the primals, which require aether-rich crystals and whose presence damages the planet.

=== Plot ===
Beginning in one of Eorzea's three main states, the player character awakens to the Echo, a power granting them the ability to see the past. The Adventurers are initially involved in both conflicts within the nations provoked by the Garlean presence, led by the Garlean Legatus Gaius van Baelsar, and the beastmen's attempts to hoard crystals and summon their primals. Eventually, a greater threat is brought to the attention of the nations by the Sharlayan scholar Louisoix Leveilleur: another Garlean Legatus named Nael van Darnus is using arcane magic and technology to summon Dalamud, the planet's second moon, down on Eorzea to purge the beastmen and primals whom the Garleans hate as violent pagans. With the aid of Garlean defector Cid nan Garlond, the Adventurers discover that Nael has set up a beacon for summoning Dalamud in the new fortress of Castrum Novum. While each nation makes individual attempts to storm the fortress, they are repelled. Faced with this, their leaders form a pact and unite the nations under the banner of the Eorzean Alliance.

Now united, the nations, aided by Adventurers, successfully storm Castrum Novum and destroy the beacon. Nael, insanely committed to her plan, makes herself into a second beacon. Though she is defeated by the Adventurers, Dalamud has descended too far for it to return into orbit, so Louisoix proposes a final desperate plan: to summon the Twelve, Eorzea's guardian deities, and return Dalamud into orbit. The Adventurers pray to altars dedicated to the Twelve across the land, then rally with the armies of the Eorzean Alliance to fight Nael's legion on the Carteneau Flats, the predicted impact site of Dalamud. In the midst of the battle, Dalamud disintegrates and reveals itself to have been a prison for the elder primal Bahamut. Enraged after his imprisonment, Bahamut begins laying waste to Eorzea. After the attempt to summon the Twelve fails, Louisoix uses the last of his power to send the Adventurers into a time rift, separating them from the flow of time so they can return when Eorzea has recovered.

== Development ==
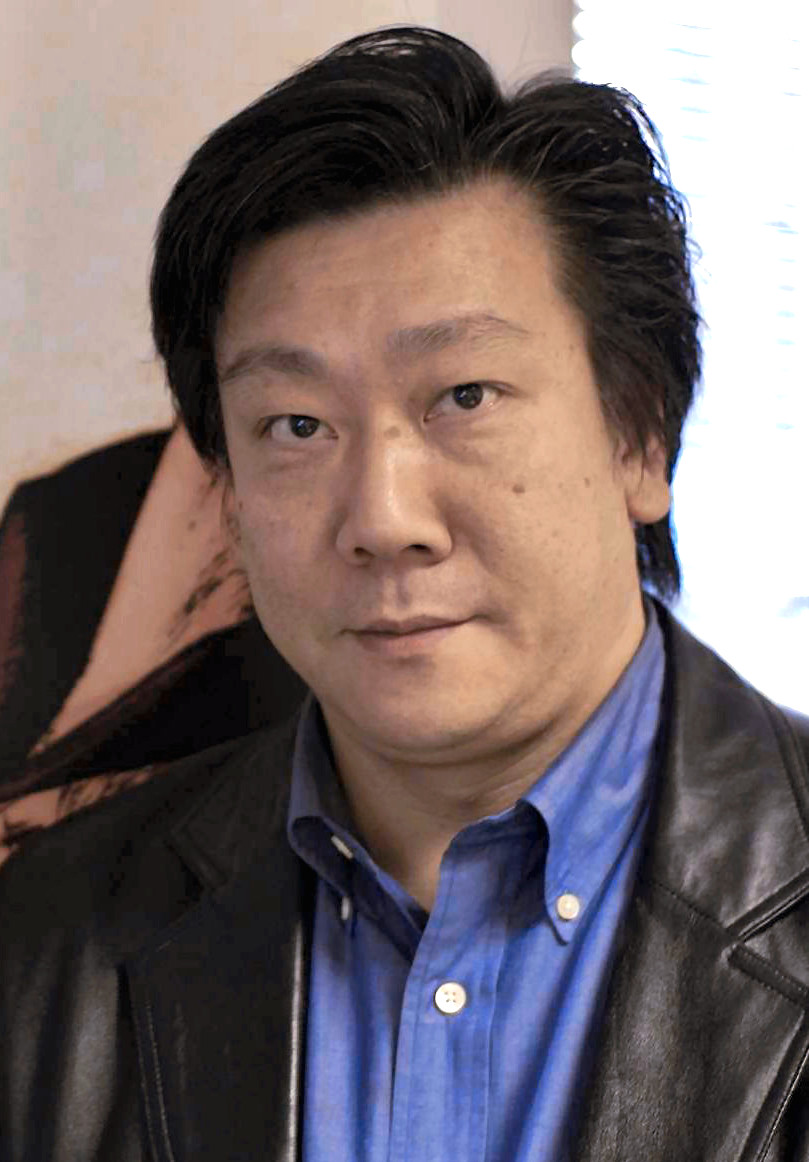
Hiromichi Tanaka, the original producer of Final Fantasy XIV, in 2007

Planning for Final Fantasy XIV began in 2005, four years prior to its official announcement. At the time, it was codenamed "Rapture" (ラプチャー, Rapuchā). While it had been decided within the company that MMORPGs would be mainline entries rather than spin-offs, the team was worried that the final product would be too radical for the main numbered series. The main staff included multiple developers who had worked on previous entries in the Final Fantasy series: producer Hiromichi Tanaka had acted as the original producer for Final Fantasy XI and been involved in multiple early Final Fantasy games, director Nobuaki Komoto was a director for XI and had been among the staff of Final Fantasy IX, writer Yaeko Sato had been the main scenario writer for XI, and Akihiko Yoshida had previously also been art director for Vagrant Story and Final Fantasy XII. The game's logo and some other artwork was designed by Yoshitaka Amano.

The game's story, primarily written by Sato, was based on a central narrative complemented by side stories. The setting and gameplay were decided upon before Sato was brought on board, with the result that she needed to consult the rest of the team when she wished to use one of Eorzea's main locations in a certain way. The story's main conflict was to be among the five main races of Eorzea and the beastmen, with the Garlean Empire acting as a third force. The placement of the Garlean Empire to the northeast of Eorzea was not meant to simulate a real-world location but naturally ended up there as the map of Hydaelyn was being created. The game's logo, designed by Amano, was designed around the importance of weapons and the concept of a wheel: the "wheel" in question was a wheel of adventurers, arranged so their backs were exposed and they needed to rely on their comrades and friends for support.

For his work as art director, Yoshida needed to adjust from working on a single static project to creating artwork assets for a game that would be updated and expanded. While the game world was created around a high fantasy aesthetic, it was meant to be realistic and encourage exploration. At the beginning of development, the team created a detailed profile of Hydaelyn, including its relationship with other planets, ecosystems, climate, and geography. This was done to promote a sense of realism. Alongside creating a seamless travel experience for players, careful work was put into the topography and varied lighting of environments so they would not seem repetitive. After the environment was created, the architectural, cultural, and religious elements of the world were incorporated into the environment. City and machine designs mixed metallic and natural materials to create a combined sense of wonder and familiarity for players. The game's five playable races were directly based on the five initial races from Final Fantasy XI, with design adjustments to reflect the new setting. The developers also created two different tribes, as opposed to the single tribe set-up present in XI. Characters' movements were primarily developed using motion capture, though the recorded movements were then adjusted so they would be sharp and distinctive. Much work was invested in creating emotes and character movements chosen by the player to represent a specific mood or emotion previously used in XI. To create realistic expressions, a character artist manually adjusted the faces for each expression. For the monsters, advances in hardware enabled the team to create more realistic and detailed character models, including detailed skin textures and carefully placed hair follicles.

The game's cutscenes were first drafted using a storyboard, then when the sequence of events had been finalized, motion capture was used to create the scene in a digitized format. Lighting and environmental effects were then put in place. One of the most challenging sequences to create was the opening real-time cutscene for the Limsa Lominsa story route: the giant sea serpent's fins were each individually animated. The game's opening cinematic was produced by Visual Works, Square Enix's in-house CGI development company. All the in-game models were first created in high-resolution form using a 3D sculpturing program, then readjusted so they could appear in the game with a lower polygon count but equivalent graphical quality. Another large part of creating the characters was their accessories: to help with this, the team developed a multi-layered development system. A technique dubbed "polygon shaving" was used so two sets of equipment could be designed to look different while using the same model data. Another function dubbed "reshaping" was used to adjust the shapes of equipment and accessories. The third element, dubbed "SSD-file", enabled the adjustment of the "materials" equipment was made of, so its color and texture could be changed. Rather than relying on a single design image, which would have been impractical for the hardware, the team took basic art and used Photoshop to add subtle changes to each. It was then passed down to the modeling team, who used the same sculpting process as was used for the game's monsters to create high-detail models while keeping the polygon count low.

The game's engine was Crystal Tools, a specially-created middleware engine that was also used in Final Fantasy XIII. So that it would be compatible with the game's specifications, the team customized the engine to suit their needs. In the end, the game's chosen engine proved unsuitable to the needs of the game, rendering its internal structure "broken". The game's development ended up being beset with multiple problems. According to a later postmortem, the team developing the game had an unhealthy obsession with graphical quality over gameplay content that led to other parts of the game being neglected, reinforced by the company's then-outdated development methods. A cited example of the focus on graphics was a flowerpot, which had as many polygons and lines of shader code as a player character. This high graphical quality meant that compromises needed to be made; for example, the number of players present on-screen at any one time needed to be limited to twenty, undermining the large-scale communal appeal of MMORPGs. This issue also impacted the game's environments; to save on memory space while preserving seamless travel, the team needed to reuse environmental features and textures on a regular basis. Another problem was that the team lacked experience in developing MMORPGs, a problem that had also beset Final Fantasy XI, but had been successfully overcome. With this in mind, the team were still using the development mindset used during the sixth console generation, which could not hold up under the increased staff and resource needs for seventh generation development. A third major reason was the company's belief that the game's problems could be patched after the initial launch, compounded by the lack of an overall plan for how to deal with them.

=== Music ===
The music for Final Fantasy XIV was composed by Nobuo Uematsu, a regular contributor to the music of the Final Fantasy series. Originally contracted to create the ending theme for XIII, Uematsu accepted the request by the XIV team to work on the game, leaving XIII's theme song to be composed by Masashi Hamauzu. Having only contributed a few tunes to Final Fantasy XI, XIV was Uematsu's first full-time work on an MMORPG. Despite this, he was treated as he would be on any other project and had considerable creative freedom as the team's vision for the game had not been finalized. For the battle themes, he used a mix of orchestral and rock pieces. He worked on XIV at the same time as working on The Last Story, a video game from original Final Fantasy creator Hironobu Sakaguchi. During the time XIV was active after the initial release, other composers including Masayoshi Soken, Naoshi Mizuta, Tsuyoshi Sekito and Ryo Yamazaki contributed to the score. Soken acted as the game's sound director and would take over as the main composer for its relaunch. The game's theme song, "Answers", was composed by Uematsu and sung by Susan Calloway, who was specially chosen by Uematsu after hearing her rendition of previous Final Fantasy theme songs.

Multiple albums featuring music from XIV have been released. Two mini-albums, Final Fantasy XIV: Battle Tracks and Final Fantasy XIV: Field Tracks, were released on September 29, 2010. A full album, Final Fantasy XIV - Eorzean Frontiers, was released on September 1, 2012 as both a single album and three mini-albums. A Blu-ray Disc album featuring all music from the original version of XIV, Before Meteor: Final Fantasy XIV Original Soundtrack, was released on August 14, 2013, two weeks prior to its relaunch.

== Release ==
XIV was first hinted at the 2005 Electronic Entertainment Expo (E3) when Square Enix announced that they were developing a new MMORPG, showing it off using a tech demo. The demo included aesthetic elements similar to XI, such as races from Vana'diel. In 2006, rumors emerged that Square Enix was developing a direct sequel to Final Fantasy XI, but further details remained unknown. During the next few years, contradictory reports were issued as to what platforms the game was being developed for: the platforms listed varied from the game being an Xbox 360 exclusive, to being for PlayStation platforms, to being for PlayStation 3 (PS3), Windows, and Xbox 360 platforms. XIV was officially announced at E3 2009 for PS3, then for Windows. After its official reveal for those platforms, it was stated that a port to Microsoft hardware was under consideration. Despite negotiation with Microsoft concerning an Xbox 360 version of the game, the two companies were unable to agree upon the use of Xbox Live, as Square Enix wanted a shared server across all platforms and Microsoft would not give them the full access necessary to implement this. Because of this disagreement and the consequent extra manpower needed to develop a version separate from the other two platforms, development on the Xbox 360 version was stopped.

According to Yoichi Wada, then-CEO of Square Enix, XIV was being planned as a serious rival to the successful western MMORPG World of Warcraft. The game was developed primarily for Windows and was then planned to be ported across to PS3. XIV was originally scheduled for simultaneous release on Windows and PS3 in 2010, but the PS3 version was delayed. This was explained as due to it taking longer than expected to make the adjustments needed so the game could fit within the console's limited memory. The game did not use the PlayOnline service used for XI. This was explained as being due to the marked decrease of content on the service. Instead, they would migrate to a new service that still allowed cross-platform gameplay, including the use of a universal Square Enix ID that would allow players to play from wherever they left off. In October 2009, the game's Beta release was announced as being only for Windows. First print runs of the PS3 version of Final Fantasy XIII contained a bonus code for the PS3 version of XIV for a special in-game item.

Due to earlier recurring issues with mistranslations related to news updates, the team decided not to implement forums in the original release, instead hearing player feedback through fan sites and unofficial forums. Also because of mistranslation fears, dedicated teams in each of the game's release regions would gather feedback and transmit it to the development team. The game's first closed Alpha test began on March 11, 2010. It was available only to veteran players from XI. During alpha testing, the team used player feedback to find out key problems with the game, such as limitations on graphical adjustments making the game run at a slow frame rate. The open Beta test was originally scheduled to begin on August 31 but was indefinitely postponed due to the discovery of critical bugs in the game. The Beta test eventually went live on September 2, running until the game's release later that month. It was later stated that more time should have been given to fixing bugs during the Beta period. The game was released on September 30, six months prior to the PS3 version's original projected release date of March 2011. A Collector's Edition was released on September 22, allowing owners to log into the game from that date. The Collector's Edition, which was decorated with artwork from Amano and Yoshida, came with bonus items including a DVD featuring a behind-the-scenes documentary, a security token, a case for the game's box, and a decorated tumbler. The game was released with text in Japanese, English, French, and German, while the spoken dialogue in cutscenes was English in all versions.

== Reception ==
Reception

Aggregate score
Aggregator	Score
Metacritic	49/100 (26 reviews)

Review scores
Publication	Score
1Up.com	D+
Computer and Video Games	6.2/10
Eurogamer	5/10
GameSpot	4/10
GameSpy	2/5
GameTrailers	4.2/10
IGN	5.5/10
PC Gamer (US)	30%

During its debut week in Japan, the Collector's Edition reached #2 in the PC games charts behind Civilization 5 and ahead of StarCraft II: Wings of Liberty. In the UK charts, the game debuted at #10 behind multiple other games including F1 2010 (#1), Halo: Reach (#2), Civilization 5 (#4) and Prince of Persia: The Forgotten Sands (#7). By November 2010, the game had sold 603,000 copies worldwide.

The game received generally unfavorable reviews at release, garnering a score 49/100 by aggregate site Metacritic. Computer and Video Games said "Eorzea is a beautiful world with huge potential for vast adventures, but it's just a shame that this first voyage into it is such a mis-step". 1UP.com said that "playing Final Fantasy XIV is like playing with a toy stuck in a plastic bag: it can be fun for a while and you can get the general idea, but you can't appreciate the full experience", stating that future updates would likely rectify this issue. IGN said that "much of the promise of the combat system and depth of the crafting mechanics are drowned, unfortunately, under a sea of interface and performance issues that hinder the experience at nearly every step", further stating that while patches might improve the experience, its state at the time of the review made it "not a world worth visiting". GameSpot, in addition to warning players away from the game, said that "Final Fantasy XIV is a notable entry to the genre but only for what it lacks".

GameTrailers was particularly critical, saying that it had been "released before it was finished", calling it "[a] broken, incomplete mess". PC Gamer called the game "a shallow, slow, grind-heavy MMO crippled by a horrible interface and nonsensical player limitations". GameSpy was again highly critical, saying that "barring a complete overhaul of the user interface, the combat, the player interaction mechanics, the progress system, and of the layout of the world itself, Final Fantasy XIV is unlikely to ever be fun". Eurogamer said that while the game would appeal to some players, they advised them to "wait another six months before even thinking about Final Fantasy XIV, because Square Enix hasn't yet got its head around its own players".

Critics agreed that the game's graphics were good and enjoyed Uematsu's score, with several praising the concepts behind the Job and leveling systems. Alongside this, unanimous criticism was laid against the gameplay pace, its convoluted interface, bugs and glitches, and the slow pace of the story. It was generally seen as a great disappointment both as an MMORPG and a mainline entry in the Final Fantasy series. Later, as part of an interview concerning the game's later development, 1UP.com commented that subsequent patches and overhauls had turned the game into something more playable.

== Post-release ==
The release of the game sparked an immediate player backlash in addition to its negative critical reception. Some of the controversies were produced by the use of gameplay features unusual for the genre. The main complaint by players was the user interface, followed by problems with the performance and aspects of gameplay. The initial 30-day free trial was extended twice in order to allow players to experience the new development team's updates before committing to the game. In December 2010, Tanaka and Komoto were removed from their posts as producer and director, with Tanaka taking full responsibility for the game's problems. The PS3 version was indefinitely delayed from its original March 2011 release date, with Square Enix saying that it would not release the game for that platform until it fully met the quality standards suitable for the Final Fantasy series. Subscriptions for the Windows version were also suspended indefinitely.

The position of producer and director was taken over by Naoki Yoshida, a staff member at Square Enix who had previously worked on the Dragon Quest series. Among these were other staff changes: Komoto was reassigned to become lead game designer, Akihiko Yoshida became lead scenario concept artist, Hiroshi Takai was appointed as lead artist, and Akihiko Matsui became lead combat system designer. Yoshida's main priority was to make the game a playable experience after the poor launch and subsequent reaction. Through subsequent patches to the game, multiple graphical and gameplay improvements were made: among the most notable being the addition of a job system, personal chocobos, a revamped battle system, greater customization options for gear, and multiple new dungeons and bosses. Yoshida also introduced the official Final Fantasy XIV forums in order to obtain player feedback and suggestions, and stated that interacting with and growing closer to the community would be a high priority. During this period, XIV and XI were taken offline to help with energy conservation in the aftermath of the earthquake and tsunami in 2011. They went back online one week later as other means were found to reduce their energy usage that did not involve their online services. The developers also received messages from Japanese players that they were using the game to communicate with their friends and relatives while landline and cell service were still unavailable. Due to the earthquake, a planned and partially-developed boss battle with the primal Titan was cut and replaced by another battle: the team felt that players might be offended by the primal and associate beast tribe's links with the power of earth in this context. They created a fight against Good King Moggle Mog instead by repurposing existing character models for moogles and modifying a moogle theme song that Uematsu had already composed.

The team could not fully mend the game in its existing form as its engine and server structure were already critically flawed. This meant that in order to save XIV, the entire game needed to be rebuilt from the ground up. The decision to launch a new version as a reboot instead of a whole new title was driven by the need to regain player trust, which was felt would not be done by just scrapping XIV. The original story planned for XIV was changed to build up towards the end of the original game's life, with new boss battles being introduced leading up to the final storyline. The "Seventh Umbral Era" storyline was used as a story-based reason for the radical changes coming to the game and its landscape. Yoshida came up with the idea to use a world-ending event after seeing a television program about the 2012 doomsday prophecy, attributed to the Mayan calendar. In the run-up to this, reduced subscription fees were reintroduced with special bonuses included for the eventual reboot of the game, and major server merges were carried out to ease the transition between versions of the game, a move which initially provoked a negative reaction from players. The final revision of the game was put out on November 1, 2012. After a final in-game battle where all XIV players were invited, the servers were closed down on November 11.

== Legacy ==
The flawed release and poor reception of the game had a heavy impact on Square Enix: citing XIV among other reasons, the company reduced its projected income for the year by 90%. At the 2011 Tokyo Game Show, Wada issued an official apology for the quality of the game, saying that "the Final Fantasy brand [had] been greatly damaged". The company and development team eventually decided to scrap the current version of XIV, rebuilding it from the ground up. This rebooted version, initially titled Final Fantasy XIV 2.0, began development in April of the same year. The rebooted version was released in 2013 with the subtitle A Realm Reborn, and has been positively received by critics and players, reaching a registered player base of more than 22 million players by April 2021. Yoshida, commenting in a later interview, said that A Realm Reborn was just the first part of regaining player trust after the release of XIV, predicting that the process would take a long time.

In a 2019 interview with Easy Allies, Yoshida joked that the idea of a legacy XIV 1.0 server (in the vein of World of Warcraft Classic) would be a "nightmare".

== See also ==
- List of Square Enix video game franchises
