= Characters of Final Fantasy XII =

Seven members of the main cast of Final Fantasy XII.

Final Fantasy XII, a role-playing video game released by Square Enix in 2006, revolves around the attempt to liberate the kingdom of Dalmasca from the Archadian Empire. The story is told through the eyes of Vaan, an orphan who wishes to be a sky pirate, and other characters he encounters throughout his adventure. The visuals of the characters were designed by Akihiko Yoshida, while their stories were created by Daisuke Watanabe. The characters were designed to look and behave unlike any that had existed in the Final Fantasy series before them. Their stories were written to create a script where neither side was truly right or wrong, but instead had different opinions and interpretations of the events occurring in the game.

There are six main playable characters in Final Fantasy XII; Vaan, an energetic orphan of Rabanastre who dreams of becoming a sky pirate; Ashe, a determined princess of Dalmasca who lost her husband in the Archadian invasion; Basch, a disgraced knight of Dalmasca charged with treason for slaying the king; Balthier, a gentlemanly sky pirate who pilots his airship, the Strahl; Fran, Balthier's partner and a viera exile whose knowledge extends to legends and myths; and Penelo, Vaan's childhood friend who accompanies him in journeys to keep an eye on him. There are also several "Guest" characters, who temporarily join the main party at various points in the plotline, such as Larsa, the young prince of Archadia, Vossler, a member of the resistance against the Archadian Empire, and Reddas, a disillusioned former Magistrate of Archadia. Other major characters who influence the plot of the game but are not playable characters include Vayne, the eldest prince of Archadia and main antagonist of the story, Gabranth, the twin brother of Basch, and Cid, a brilliant scientist and father to Balthier.

The characters in the game have been the basis of several pieces of merchandise produced by Square Enix, such as statues, action figures, and jewelry. They have been subject to mixed reviews; some reviews have applauded the characters' dialogue and relationships to each other, while others dismissed the story and characters as uninteresting. Critiques of the voice acting for the characters has also been mixed, with different reviews either praising or criticizing both the acting and the technical quality of the recordings.

== Cast creation and influences ==
Final Fantasy XII's characters were designed by Akihiko Yoshida. It was his first involvement in a main-series Final Fantasy game, though he worked as the character designer for Final Fantasy Tactics and Vagrant Story, both of which were set in the same game world as XII, Ivalice. Comments have been made about the similarity between Yoshida's creations and those of Tetsuya Nomura, the character designer for Final Fantasy VII, VIII, X, and XIII. Yoshida feels this connection is sparked by the style of color used by both artists, which involves a color consistency between the characters and the environments. In an interview included in a bonus disc of the collector's edition of the game, he states that he created the design of the characters after reading all of the design documents on their history and beliefs. He tried to create designs and clothing that did not exist anywhere in real life and had never been seen before, designing for example the armor for the Judges on a combination of historical armor, mountain bike gear, and futuristic ideas.

The story of the characters was created by scenario writer Daisuke Watanabe. In the bonus disc interview, he states that he endeavored to create characters that were neither fully good nor evil, adding flaws such as selfishness to the heroes and virtues such as kindness to the villains, in an attempt to make them more realistic. He also said he tried to create a scenario in which neither side was truly right or wrong, but instead just had different interpretations of the events in the game. He tried to convey the emotions of the characters through their lines, the acting of the voice actors, and in the facial expressions of the in-game models. Alexander O. Smith, the English translator for the game, included accents to the characters for the English version of the game to add a layer of depth to the game by having characters from different areas of Ivalice sound different. He based these accents off the extensive notes made by game designer Yasumi Matsuno on the backgrounds of the characters. Smith chose voice actors for the project who had stage and film acting experience, in an attempt to avoid the common problem of "flat" reading he felt was prevalent in video game voice acting.

The designers have stated that non-human characters and races feature a prominent role in the game, which was influenced by an interest in history among the developers. Comparing the non-human races in Final Fantasy IX with those of XII, the developers have stated that the former were modeled after humans, while the latter were fundamentally different in terms of biological characteristics. These non-human races include Bangaa, Viera, Seeq, and Moogles. In the game, humans are referred to as Humes. Some of the races in the game that first appeared in Final Fantasy Tactics Advance, such as Bangaa, were originally designed for Final Fantasy XII.

When asked why the main character, Vaan, was so effeminate, the development team explained that their previous game, Vagrant Story, which featured a "strong man in his prime" as the protagonist had been unsuccessful and unpopular; the change regarding Final Fantasy XII from a "big and tough" protagonist to a more effeminate one was thus decided after targeting demographics were considered. The game's art director Hideo Minaba has said that Vaan is not comparable to any previous protagonist of the series, which he explained as partially a result of the game using a different character designer than previous ones. The geography of Ivalice, particularly Dalmasca, had an influence in the character's initial designs. When asked about the characters' revealing clothing, Yoshida commented that "Dalmasca is supposed to have a hot climate", and that the idea of the characters revealing skin was his.

== Playable characters ==
=== Vaan ===
Vaan (ヴァン, Van) is the main protagonist of Final Fantasy XII. He is a 17-year-old orphaned Hume street urchin who lost his parents to a plague when he was 12 years old. His only brother, Reks, died two years before the start of the game during the Archadian invasion of Dalmasca. He makes a living as Migelo's assistant, running various errands for him while pickpocketing from Archadian soldiers, claiming to take back what is Dalmasca's. He is a cheerful and energetic boy who dreams of someday becoming a sky pirate in command of his own airship. He trains to meet this goal by killing large dire rats in the sewers of Rabanastre on a daily basis, for which Dalan gave him the nickname "Vaan Ratsbane". Despite nominally being the main protagonist, as the player starts the game controlling him, most of the game focuses on the world's events and conflicts and Ashe, with his character used as a narrative device to allow the player to follow the events as an outside observer. Over the course of the game, Vaan comes to understand he spent his time running from his problems and blaming the Archadian empire for them, rather than moving on with his life after his brother and parents' deaths. By the end of the game, Vaan is a sky pirate traveling the world with Penelo.

During the events of Revenant Wings, Vaan becomes captain of the Airship Galbana and uses it to travel to Lemures, meeting old friends while making new ones. He is given the title of the "leading man" which Balthier formerly held, and other characters suggest a teacher/student relationship between them, though Balthier denies this. In the aftermath, Vaan and Penelo, who are now a couple, leave Rabanastre to have their own adventure, sporting a shirt over his outfit by the time of Final Fantasy Tactics A2.

The recent Vagrant Story, which featured a rugged and tough protagonist, was deemed a commercial failure. Therefore, Vaan was designed to be effeminate and placed in the main role, as the developers believed the public would be more interested in a teenager. He would have been even more effeminate if Kouhei Takeda had not been cast for his voice acting and motion capture, and Vaan became more "active, upbeat, bright and positive" than originally planned. He was designed by character designer Akihiko Yoshida to look Asian. Vaan is voiced in Final Fantasy XII by Bobby Edner in English and by Kouhei Takeda in Japanese. Vaan has also appeared in other video games; despite having been created for Final Fantasy XII, he was first introduced in the 2004 crossover board game Itadaki Street Special for the PlayStation 2. He also appears in Itadaki Street Portable and Dissidia 012 Final Fantasy, both for the PlayStation Portable. In Dissidia 012 Final Fantasy, Bobby Edner reprises his role in English; however, Takeda was unable to reprise his role as Vaan and was replaced by Kensho Ono in Japanese.

=== Ashe ===
Ashelia B'nargin Dalmasca (アーシェ・バナルガン・ダルマスカ, Āshe Banarugan Darumasuka), also known as Ashe, is a 19-year-old Hume princess fighting to liberate her kingdom, Dalmasca, from the Archadian Empire. She is the only living child of King Raminas and the sole heir to the throne, and married Rasler Heios Nabradia shortly before Archadia's invasion of Dalmasca. Following their marriage, he died in battle defending Nalbina Fortress on the border of his home state of Nabradia, making her a widow. While many believed their marriage was driven by politics, she spent the two years following his death in mourning and continued to wear her wedding ring.

She was thought to have committed suicide, but took on the alias Amalia (アマリア, Amaria), to serve as the leader of the Resistance before joining the group. Her desire for revenge against Archadia for the horrors its army committed on her people was manipulated by the Occuria to reinforce their rule over Ivalice. Over the course of the story, the Occuria create an image of Rasler to guide Ashe where they need her to go. In their encounter, the Occuria offer her nethicite to rule as another Dynast-King and conquer Ivalice in their stead; she rejects their offer. Ashe acknowledges Larsa's intention to stop the war and makes her way to Vayne in the Sky Fortress Bahamut to end it. A year after the Bahamut's crash, Ashe is crowned Queen of Dalmasca and rejoins her friends in fighting the mysterious Judge of Wings in Revenant Wings. She is also featured in the rhythm game Theatrhythm Final Fantasy as a subcharacter representing Final Fantasy XII.

Akihiko Yoshida has stated that Ashe's physical features were designed with the intent of making her look vaguely French, saying that "the base of her bone structure is a French person's. We were given orders from the start to not make her look like an Asian. But we modified her a bit to look more like a Japanese for the sake of the Japanese audience, and also since a character that looks completely French makes some of the CG expressions difficult". Ashe is voiced by Kari Wahlgren in English and Mie Sonozaki in Japanese. Despite having been created for Final Fantasy XII, she was first introduced in Itadaki Street Special. She also appears in Itadaki Street Portable and was set to appear in Fortress, as revealed in concept art for the game. Another version of Ashe appears within the backstory of Final Fantasy XIV, where she is the twin sister of Rasler instead of his wife.

=== Basch fon Ronsenburg ===
Basch fon Ronsenburg (バッシュ・フォン・ローゼンバーグ, Basshu fon Rōzenbāgu) is a 36-year-old Captain in the Order of Knights of Dalmasca. He and his twin brother Noah are natives of the Republic of Landis, which the Archadians conquered long before the events of the game. After Landis was overthrown, Basch fled to Dalmasca and Noah to Archadia, and they lost contact. Basch joined the Dalmascan army, eventually rising to become one of its most respected officers. When Archadia attacked Nalbina Fortress, Basch and Ashe's husband, Lord Rasler Heios, led the defense. However, the Archadian forces overwhelmed their troops and an archer mortally wounded Lord Rasler. Basch carried Rasler's body from the battlefield and went into hiding with the surviving commanders of the Dalmascan military. Shortly after the Archadians moved in to occupy Rabanastre, he and Captain Azelas led an assault on Nalbina Fortress in an attempt to save the king, only for Imperial forces to capture him. Noah, now called Gabranth and employed under Archadia, posed as Basch and slew the Dalmascan king and Vaan's older brother, Reks, who witnessed the crime. The Dalmascans denounced Basch as a traitor and he was reportedly executed by Marquis Ondore. In reality, Vayne imprisoned him in the Nalbina Dungeons to ensure Ondore's loyalty to the Empire—if Ondore betrayed the Archadians, Vayne could destroy his credibility by revealing that Basch was still alive.

During their attempt to escape Nalbina Dungeon, Vaan, Balthier, and Fran discover Basch chained in a cage suspended from the ceiling. Despite initially being suspicious of him, especially Vaan, who blamed him for Reks's death, Basch protests his innocence and tells them about his twin. The party decides his story is plausible and release him. After being freed, he makes it his mission to protect Ashe and support the Resistance. After he and his brother reunite, Gabranth is deeply puzzled by Basch's continued ability to persevere in spite of his past failures. Basch explains that his vow to defend Ashe had given him purpose and a renewed sense of honor. After the final battle against Vayne, as Noah is dying, he asks Basch to take his place as Larsa's protector. Because it was still widely believed that Basch was dead, he adopted his brother's name and title when entering Larsa's service. In Revenant Wings, Larsa sends him to be the Empire's representative in dealing with the Judge of Wings. Basch is voiced by Keith Ferguson in English and Rikiya Koyama in Japanese. He also appears in Itadaki Street Portable. Another version of Basch appears within the backstory of Final Fantasy XIV as the father of Legatus Noah van Gabranth of the IVth Imperial Legion.

=== Penelo ===
Penelo (パンネロ, Pannero) is a 17-year-old (16-year-old in the Japanese version) Hume orphan and Vaan's childhood friend who serves as a voice of reason and keeps him out of trouble. She dreams of being a dancer and learned martial arts from her older brothers. Five years before the Archadian invasion, a plague struck Rabanastre that killed Vaan's parents; Vaan and Reks were adopted into Penelo's household. The Archadian invasion had also killed Penelo's family members and Reks, orphaning her and Vaan. Migelo, a friend of Penelo's parents, took them under his care and gave them work at his sundry shop.

Penelo usually tries to keep Vaan out of trouble, but is unable to stop him from intruding into the palace grounds. She later encounters Vaan, who is arrested along with Balthier and Fran. This encounter forces her into a series of events, as Bangaa headhunter Ba'gamnan kidnaps her and holds her hostage in exchange for Balthier. After escaping, she meets Larsa Solidor, one of the sons of Archadian Emperor Gramis, who takes care of her and convinces her he wishes to make peace with Dalmasca. After reuniting with Vaan, she makes him promise not to leave her side, and ever since then has traveled with him, furthering their relationship as sky pirate and partner.

A year after the Bahamut's crash, during the game's epilogue, Penelo serves as Vaan's navigator from their adventure in Revenant Wings. In the backstory of Final Fantasy XII, she has terrible cooking skills, despite being the motherly figure to the other orphans, and in the sequel, she is trying to improve her skills by running a diner on the Galbana. Her relationship with Vaan is also explored, such as during a conflict when she cares deeply for a Dalmascan knight who appeared in Lemures, much to Vaan's chagrin. By the events of Final Fantasy Tactics A2, Penelo has gained much reputation as a Sky Pirate. She is voiced by Catherine Taber in English and Marina Kozawa in Japanese. Penelo also appears in Itadaki Street Portable.

=== Balthier ===
Balthier, known as Balflear (バルフレア, Barufurea) in the original Japanese language version, is a 22-year-old Hume sky pirate and owner of the airship Strahl (German for "streak" or "beam" [of light]). He and his Viera companion, Fran, prefer to remain outside politics, making their living off of whoever has the most for the taking. They are inadvertently drawn into the war, however, when they attempt to steal the Goddess's Magicite—later revealed to be the Dusk Shard—from the Dalmascan Royal Palace. Vaan gets to the magicite first, and when Balthier and Fran confront him, the three of them are caught up in the chaos of a rebel assault on the palace.

Balthier is Archadian by birth and eventually reveals he is Ffamran mied Bunansa (ファムラン・ミド・ブナンザ, Famuran Mido Bunanza), the son of Imperial magicite researcher Dr. Cid (Cidolfus Demen Bunansa). Balthier received many privileges as Cid's son, including being made an Imperial Judge, but eventually cut ties with his father after Cid became consumed by his experimentation with nethicite. He left the service of the empire, stole an Archadian airship, and took a new name. Balthier is now a renowned career criminal with a sizable bounty on his head, and is trying to evade the law and the bounty hunters seeking the reward for his capture. He originally joins the resistance in hopes of reacquiring the Dusk Shard, but after learning it is actually a piece of nethicite, he sees too much of his father's obsession in his own quest and decides to abandon the search. After the party defeats Dr. Cid at the Pharos, Balthier makes peace with his father and helps the group destroy the Sky Fortress Bahamut as penance for Cid's deeds.

Balthier says that he is to be the "leading man" of the story throughout the game, and insists that this makes him invincible, since the hero always emerges in one piece. He and Fran are feared dead after they go down with the Sky Fortress Bahamut, but later reappear to retrieve the Strahl from Vaan and Penelo and leave a note for Ashe.

Both he and Fran intend on finding the Cache of Glabados, which is resolved in Revenant Wings when it turns out to be tied to Eternal. Balthier is at first intent to take Lemures' treasure, the Auracite. However, he knows the truth behind it and attempts to destroy the Auralith, eventually rejoining Vaan's group to fight the Judge of Wings, letting Vaan be the "leading man" while he leaves the limelight. Balthier is voiced by Gideon Emery in English and Hiroaki Hirata in Japanese. He made a crossover appearance in Final Fantasy Tactics: The War of the Lions and also appears in Itadaki Street Portable, as well as World of Final Fantasy Maxima.

=== Fran ===
Fran (フラン, Furan) is a Viera warrior, mechanic to the Strahl, and Balthier's copilot. Like all Viera, she is sensitive to the magical Mist that permeates Ivalice, and is affected by it on three separate occasions: in the Tomb of Raithwall, when Judge Ghis heats the Dawn Shard in his airship's engine, and when in the presence of the Sun-Cryst. When the party reaches Giruvegan, she can detect the Mist nearby has cooled and is less intense. She is the oldest of the characters, as Viera are very long-lived, but appears youthful.

Fran once lived with her sisters Jote and Mjrn in Eruyt Village, the secluded Viera settlement in Golmore Jungle, but became restless and desired to see the outside world. This was a major source of conflict between her and the other Viera, especially her elder sister Jote, who served as the village matriarch. Fran argued that although all Viera begin their lives in the forest, they are not necessarily bound to remain there to the end. When the party encounters an impassable Viera barrier on the path through Golmore, Fran is forced to return to the village and ask for help. She learns from Jote that their youngest sister Mjrn has run off to the nearby magicite mines. When Fran finds her and brings her back, Mjrn reveals she wishes to leave Golmore, but Fran advises her against doing so, relating how her own independence has cost her her family and the ability to commune with the Wood. Fran accepts that she is now part of the Hume world, and asks for a confirmation from Jote that the Wood accepts her before she leaves. Jote replies that The Wood misses her child and is jealous of the hume that has taken her away. Fran smiles for the first time in the game, knowing her sister is lying and still cares for her, as she leaves The Wood. In Revenant Wings, Balthier and Fran are searching for the Cache of Glabados. Fran is voiced by Nicole Fantl in English and Rika Fukami in Japanese. She also appears in Itadaki Street Portable.

=== Larsa Solidor ===
Larsa Ferrinas Solidor (ラーサー・ファルナス・ソリドール, Rāsā Farunasu Soridōru) is a 12-year-old Hume, the fourth and youngest son of Emperor Gramis of Archadia, and Vayne's brother. He is the Emperor's favorite, and Gramis works tirelessly to ensure that Larsa remains pure and free from the stain of politics and war. Despite his young age, Larsa is idealistic and believes that the strife within Ivalice can be quelled without war. Larsa possesses a great deal of respect for House Solidor and the men of his family, especially his older brother. The Senate, however, fears Vayne's growing power and the perceived threat to their own, and thus plot from the beginning of the game to place Larsa on the throne in hopes of manipulating him from behind the scenes.

Over the course of the game, Larsa proves himself to be more capable than the Senate believes. He travels with Vaan and company under the alias "Lamont" during their trip to the Lhusu Mines to rescue Penelo, but his knowledge of nethicite exposes him. Larsa helps Vaan and company escape from the Leviathan and later joins them again at Jahara, urging Ashe to use her influence on the Resistance to prevent an aggravation between the warring countries. He leaves the party at Mt. Bur-Omisace after learning from Al-Cid Margrace that his father had been murdered, attempting to reason with Vayne, but after seeing Vayne would not listen to reason, Larsa aids Vaan and company in battling Vayne. After his brother is defeated, Larsa takes his place in the Archadian throne and settles into peace agreements with Basch as his protector. In Revenant Wings, Larsa journeys to the Dalmascan Estersand with Basch, joining the Galbana's crew to stop the Judge of Wings, who is creating Anti-Archadian propaganda with her actions. Larsa is voiced by Johnny McKeown in English and Yuka Imai in Japanese.

=== Vossler Azelas ===
Vossler York Azelas (ウォースラ・ヨーク・アズラス, Wōsura Yōku Azurasu) is a 38-year-old Hume who was a former Dalmascan Knight and a close colleague of Basch. Vossler fought alongside Basch during the counter-attack at Nalbina Fortress. Like Reks, he was tricked into thinking Basch was responsible for killing King Raminas. After the battle, he fled underground and joined the Resistance alongside Princess Ashe. For the next two years, he protected the Princess and tried to restore their lost Kingdom. During the events of Final Fantasy XII, he reunites with Basch after the captain escapes Nalbina Dungeon with Vaan. While initially skeptical of the traitor, Vossler eventually learns to trust his friend once again. They meet up on the Leviathan as they are on their way to rescue Ashe. Vossler dons an Archadian judge armor to fool the guards and enable them to rescue the Princess, and escapes to Bhujerba where they plan to keep the Princess safe.

However, the Princess decides to take matters in her own hands and travel to the Tomb of Raithwall to obtain the treasure of the Dynast-King. Vossler catches up after being left behind at the Ogir-Yensa Sandsea while on their way to the Tomb. He offers to protect Princess Ashe once again, despite objecting to Balthier and Fran's invading the royal tomb. After the party gets the treasure, the Dawn Shard, from the tomb, they are taken aboard the Leviathan once again. There, Vossler reveals that he, embittered by their "profitless battle", has made a deal with the Archadian Empire so Dalmasca's sovereignty could be restored. After being defeated, he tells Basch it is up to him to protect the Princess. As Ashe and the others escape in an airship, the nethicite explosion from the Leviathan annihilates the fleet. However, Vossler is presumably alive because the Shiva were seen escaping the explosion, albeit badly damaged. Vossler is voiced by Nolan North in English and Masaki Terasoma in Japanese.

=== Reddas ===
Reddas (レダス, Redasu) is a 33-year-old Hume sky pirate from Balfonheim. In truth, he was originally the missing Judge Magister Foris Zecht (フォーリス・ゼクト, Fōrisu Zekuto) of Archadia. During the war with Nabradia, he was responsible for the Midlight Shard destroying the kingdom under orders from Cid without being told what its effects would be. Out of guilt, he abandoned his post and took on the name "Reddas", arriving in Balfonheim, where he cleaned up the town and became a patron to pirates. Ondore eventually approached him and asked that he retrieve deifacted nethicite, the shards of the Sun-Cryst, from Doctor Cid. Later, he accompanies Ashe to the Pharos at Ridorana to find the Sun-Cryst. After Cid activates the Sun-Cryst, Reddas sacrifices himself by using the Sword of Kings to destroy the crystal, unleashing an explosion which vaporizes him and most of the upper Pharos. Reddas is voiced by Phil LaMarr in English and Takayuki Sugo in Japanese.

== Major characters ==
=== Vayne Solidor ===
Vayne Carudas Solidor (ヴェイン・カルダス・ソリドール, Vein Karudasu Soridōru) is the third son of Emperor Gramis and Larsa's older brother, as well as the main antagonist of Final Fantasy XII. He is the 27-year-old Hume Consul of the Archadian-occupied Dalmasca, Commandant of the Archadian Empire's Western Armada, and a member of House Solidor, whose members had led the Empire for four generations. This in effect makes him a "Prince", though he claims the democratic nature of the Empire makes him no more eligible for the throne than anyone else.

Despite caring for the welfare of the people and of his family, Vayne is willing to use any means necessary to maintain order and retain power. He ensures the complete subjugation of Nabradia and Dalmasca and exterminates their royal families to acquire their deifacted nethicite and confronts Dalmasca's resistance movement with absolute ruthlessness, accepting no surrender. He even goes so far as to murder his ailing father and frame the Imperial senators to put an end to their scheming against him and Larsa, as well as leveling cities in nethicite testing experiments. Vayne seeks to free humanity from the control of the Occurians, a race of god-like beings that have for centuries secretly meddled with the course of human history.

During the battle over Rabanastre at the end of the game, Vayne commands the Sky Fortress Bahamut, and after confronted by the team, uses the nethicite to become "Vayne Novus" before Vaan mortally wounds him. Venat, however, awards Vayne for helping it by giving him the power of an Occurian, causing Vayne to become the monstrous "Undying" and grafting pieces of the Bahamut's superstructure onto his body. In the ensuing battle, Vaan kills Vayne. Vayne is voiced in English by Elijah Alexander and Nobuo Tobita in Japanese.

=== Gabranth ===
Gabranth (ガブラス, Gaburasu), also known as Noah fon Ronsenburg (ノア・フォン・ローゼンバーグ, Noa fon Rōzenbāgu), is a 36-year-old Hume Judge Magister of Archadia, as well as the secondary antagonist of Final Fantasy XII. He is Basch's twin brother, and in the introduction to the game, is responsible for the deaths of Reks and King Raminas, which Basch was blamed for. After the fall of Landis years prior to the start of the game, Basch left for Dalmasca, leaving behind Noah and their mother, who was suffering from an illness at the time. Noah, however, remained with their mother and moved with her to her home country of Archadia, where he took on her surname of Gabranth. After his mother died of her illness, Gabranth began to hate Basch for abandoning his homeland and family. Soon after, he was noticed by Emperor Gramis and joined the Archadian Judges with his backing; he rose to become a Judge Magister, the position that he holds at the beginning of the game.

During the game, at the Emperor's behest, he acts as an informant on Vayne and is selected as Larsa's protector. Gabranth loathes himself for the framing of his brother and the tasks Vayne and the Empire have commanded him to do, such as killing Drace to prove his loyalty to Vayne after his rise to power. He accompanies Bergan and Zargabaath to Mt. Bur-Omisace, where Larsa agrees to return with him to avoid any trouble. Gabranth is later sent to Pharos to "test" Ashe if she would take revenge, attacking the group in rage when they refuse to exact vengeance for the wrongs against them as he had; he leaves after his defeat and the arrival of Cid. At the end of the game, after a discussion and fight with Basch, Gabranth decides to make up for his wrongs by protecting Larsa and helping the Resistance kill Vayne. In the process, Vayne fatally injures him, causing him to die after the battle. As he is dying, he requests that Basch replace him as the protector of the new Emperor Larsa. Basch agrees, and is later shown serving as "Gabranth" and Larsa's protector. Gabranth is one of the villains and the sole character representing Final Fantasy XII in Dissidia: Final Fantasy, where, as in XII, he is voiced by Akio Ōtsuka in Japanese; in the English version of XII he is voiced by Michael E. Rodgers, but in Dissidia he is instead voiced by Keith Ferguson, who also voiced Basch in XII. An adaptation of the character named Noah van Gabranth appears in Final Fantasy XIV as a Garlean Legatus; in contrast to Final Fantasy XII, Noah is the son of Basch van Gabranth.

=== Cid Bunansa ===
Cidolfus Demen Bunansa (シドルファス・デム・ブナンザ, Shidorufasu Demu Bunanza), also known as Doctor Cid, is a fifty-eight-year-old Archadian Hume scientist and head of the Draklor Laboratory in Archades. He is one of the main antagonists of Final Fantasy XII. He is responsible for discovering the technology behind airships, as well as for the creation of manufactured, or artificial, nethicite. He is later revealed to be Balthier's father, whose ambitions drove Balthier away; this incident was the result of Cid going to Giruvegan to study nethicite, only to return as a maniacal shell of his former self. Over the course of the game, Cid seems to talk to himself multiple times, but it is later revealed that he is instead talking to Venat, a renegade Occurian; Occurians have the ability to make themselves seen and heard by whom they wish. Under Venat's guidance, Cid helps Vayne encourage the war to gain shards of the Sun-Cryst to help him create manufactured nethicite.

Cid is confronted by Vaan, Balthier and company at the Draklor Laboratory, only to lose and flee. He goes to the Pharos lighthouse to invoke the Sun-Cryst's full power, revealing himself to the main characters there once Gabranth is defeated. Enraged, Gabranth tries to attack Cid, who teleports out of the way as Venat throws the judge against a wall. Cid fights Vaan, Balthier and the rest of the party once more, and again loses. He dies after the battle, dissolving into energy absorbed by the Sun-Cryst before it is destroyed and fully activates his final airship, the Bahamut. A character named Cid appears or is mentioned in every main Final Fantasy title; this appearance is the first Final Fantasy game to feature a Cid character as a villain. Cid is voiced by John Rafter Lee in English and Chikao Ōtsuka in Japanese.

=== Halim Ondore IV ===
Halim Ondore IV (ハルム・オンドール4世, Harumu Ondōru Yonsei) is the Hume Marquis of the Skycity of Bhujerba, the most recent in a line of nobles that ruled Bhujerba for generations. Ondore is also Ashe's uncle, serving as the officiant of her wedding and Rasler's funeral soon after. At the opening of the game, Ondore appears to have yielded to Archadian rule, though he secretly supports the resistance movement. He is being blackmailed by Vayne, who forced him to announce the execution of Basch and the death of Ashe in an attempt to keep the resistance from trusting him or accepting his support. During the game, once the Archadian 8th Fleet is destroyed, Ondore openly announces his support of the rebel forces and enlists Rozarria's aid for a large assault against the Archadian Empire. Ondore is the narrator in the story, as his memoirs are read during certain points of the game. He is voiced by Tom Kane in English and Akio Nojima in Japanese.

=== Al-Cid Margrace ===
Al-Cid Margrace (アルシド・マルガラス, Arushido Marugarasu) is a member of the Rozarrian ruling family, the House of Margrace. He is seen during the game attempting to keep Rozarria and Archadia from fighting a costly war, as well as informing the main characters of political developments in Archadia. Although he succeeds in keeping the two countries from fighting for most of the game, he joins the resistance in a strike against Vayne at the end of the game. Al-Cid appears in Final Fantasy Tactics A2: Grimoire of the Rift when Vaan requests his aid. After Vaan and Penelo join Luso's party, Al-Cid requests membership as well to lie low from his duties as royalty. Al-Cid was initially given only a small role in the original storyline, but Norio Wakamoto, his Japanese voice actor, had "voiced Al-Cid in such an interesting way" that the developers decided to expand on Al-Cid's role. He is voiced in English by David Rasner.

=== Occuria ===
Concept artwork of the Occuria, during its initial designs, resembled a recurring Final Fantasy monster called Mindflayers.

The Occuria (オキューリア, Okyūria) are a small group of immortal beings, often called by both themselves and others the Undying (不滅なる神, Fumetsunaru Kami). They are referred to as gods by some, but unknown to the major religions in Ivalice, they played a vital role in the history of Ivalice. They were responsible for the creation of the Espers and granting power to King Raithwall to conquer the countries of Ivalice with the Dawn, Dusk, and Midlight shards of nethicite. The Occuria were first designed to be a race of Mindflayers, a type of enemy monster in the game. Earlier concept artwork portrayed these "Mindflayers" as wearing luxurious robes and turbans and lounging in a bar and smoking pipes. The design was changed during development, and the Mindflayer was placed as a special monster, retaining the initial design; the Occuria were then given a different design of glowing eyes in a mist-like form.

The Occurian with the greatest influence on the story is Venat (ヴェーネス, Vēnesu), one of the primary antagonists of Final Fantasy XII, who rebels against the other Occuria and tries to give the people of Ivalice the power to not be manipulated by the Occuria; as a result of its defiance, it is labeled a heretic. Venat taught Doctor Cid the secrets of nethicite, allowing them to manufacture it themselves; it also convinced Cid and Vayne to seek out the nethicite shards originally cut from the Sun-Cryst by Raithwall. In the game, Venat is seen talking to Cid both while visible and not. Venat's ambitions are ultimately fulfilled when Ashe resists the Occurians' plans and Reddas destroys the Sun-Cryst, later sacrificing itself to give Vayne his power while proclaiming they will die together, as it has accomplished what it set out to do. It is voiced by Anita Carey in English and Narumi Tsunoda in Japanese. A character sharing Venat's name appears in Final Fantasy XIV; like her namesake, she is a dissenting member of her race that set the events of the game into motion.

== Cultural impact ==
=== Merchandise ===
In conjunction with the game's release, Square Enix has produced a lineup of merchandise including jewelry, action figures and other goods related to the characters. Most of the merchandise are released in Japan. The items produced include Vaan's necklace, Ashe's wedding ring, a Judge Magister-themed lighter and a Magister-themed card case. A plush doll of Nono and four full-colored action figures of Ashe, Balthier, Vaan, and Judge Gabranth have also been displayed in the Square Enix Japan merchandise page, along with a full-sized replica of Judge Gabranth's helmet from the game, a statue of Gabranth, and a statue of Balthier and Fran riding a flying machine through a collapsing building.

=== Critical reception ===
The characters in Final Fantasy XII have received mixed opinions from reviewers. Praises were given by Calvin Smith of PSX Extreme, who stated that the characters are "classy and well thought out, an ensemble cast whose players rarely descend into needless melodrama or writhing angst". He also said that the supposed main character's role was changed to become an observer, "a different outlook than in the previous installments". 1UP.com's Andrew Pfister applauded the character dialogues as being "intelligent, subtle and sharp"; the relationships between characters were lauded as well. Balthier and Fran's relationship was compared to Han Solo and Chewbacca of Star Wars, being "far more interesting than anything Square's put out in the modern FF era". IGN editor Jeremy Dunham praised the game and its writers for "evolving the personalities, histories, and motives of characters you already thought you knew, but didn't" and for "capitaliz[ing] on the opportunity to tell you about them". He also noted the visual and auditory detail of the characters, saying that "each and every model, down to the most obscure NPC, has an immense level of attention paid to them -- from their clothes and facial expressions, to their walking and idle animations" and that the voice acting was "top-notch". GameSpy's Justin Speer also praised the characters, saying that it was hard to "resist being charmed by a few of the characters" and that they "interact with each other in dramatic and interesting ways".

Other reviewers have criticized the character development. Shane Bettenhausen of Official U.S. PlayStation Magazine found the game's cast "a tad mundane" compared to characters from previous installments. Moreover, they found both Vaan and Ashe uninteresting, making the story lack "the emotional punch". They also criticized the voice acting as uneven and rife with mispronunciations. GameTrailers also criticized the characters, saying that many of the game's "other characters" are "more interesting than the ones you'll actually control", and that the "characters' motivations are thin to non-existent". RPGFan editor Stephen Harris, while praising the quality of most of the voice acting and especially Balthier's, criticized Fran's as "monotone and subdued" with an "indecipherable accent". Cortney Stone of RPGamer found fault with the voice acting recording, describing it as "substandard" and said that "it sounds as though a few of the actors were too close to the microphones or the equipment was faulty", though she called "the voice acting itself quite good, with characters of different nations having distinctive accents".
