= Final Fantasy Tactics A2: Grimoire of the Rift =

2007 video game

- North American box art
- Developer: Square Enix
- Publisher: Square Enix
- Director: Yuichi Murasawa
- Producer: Hiroaki Kato
- Artists: Ryoma Ito; Akihiko Yoshida
- Writer: Kyoko Kitahara
- Composers: Hitoshi Sakimoto; Masaharu Iwata
- Series: Final Fantasy; Ivalice Alliance
- Platform: Nintendo DS
- Release: JP: October 25, 2007; NA: June 24, 2008; PAL: June 27, 2008
- Genre: Tactical role-playing
- Mode: Single-player

Final Fantasy Tactics A2: Grimoire of the Rift (Note: Fainaru Fantajī Takutikusu Eitsū: Fūketsu no Gurimoa (Japanese: ファイナルファンタジータクティクス A2 封(ふう)穴(けつ)のグリモア; Final Fantasy Tactics A2: The Sealed Grimoire)) is a 2007 tactical role-playing game developed and published by Square Enix for the Nintendo DS. Releasing in 2007 in Japan and 2008 in the West, the game is a sequel to Final Fantasy Tactics Advance and forms part of the Ivalice Alliance, a group of games set in the titular fictional universe. The game features cameo appearances from central and supporting characters from Final Fantasy XII, a title set in Ivalice.

Tactics A2 follows a young man named Luso Clemens after he is transported through a magical book to the world of Ivalice. Rescued from monsters by a clan leader named Cid and later joined by the thief Adelle, Luso becomes involved in battles between rival clans as he seeks a way home. Gameplay carries over mechanics from Tactics Advance including turn-based combat on a grid, a themed Job system, and a "Law" system placing limitations on player action during battles.

Originally planned for Game Boy Advance prior to the DS's worldwide commercial success, the project began development in 2006 with the aim of expanding on the elements of Tactics Advance. Director Yuichi Murasawa, artist Ryoma Ito, and composer Hitoshi Sakimoto all returned from Tactics Advance. The English translation was done by Alexander O. Smith and Joseph Reeder, who had worked on Final Fantasy XII and Vagrant Story. It received generally positive reviews, and went on to sell 670,000 units worldwide. Elements from the game were later used in mobile titles set in Ivalice.

== Gameplay ==
The second battle in Final Fantasy Tactics A2: Grimoire of the Rift; an enemy prepares to attack the main protagonist Luso.

Final Fantasy Tactics A2: Grimoire of the Rift is a tactical role-playing game in which players take control of a party from the clan of protagonist Luso Clemens—Clan Gully—for turn-based tactical combat in three-dimensional isometric areas viewed through a fixed camera. The game's world of Ivalice is divided into sections which unlock as the story progresses; character units not in the player's active party can be sent on training missions to grow stronger or complete side-quests.

In addition to story and side-quests, Clan quests can be completed which cost a special in-game currency dubbed Clan Points and feature optional handicaps; the reward for completion increases with the amount of handicaps in place. The Clan also controls areas of Ivalice, with the Clan bidding for control of areas in auction houses and defending them with teams made up of inactive party members. When the Clan fights in native territory, they receive passive ability boosts. Between missions, the Clan can purchase new equipment at guilds, with the types of gear available depending on their Clan ranking. Equipment is principally earned from loot drops after an enemy is defeated.

The game's turn-based battles play out in a grid-based arena; each unit on both sides has their turn placed according to their Agility statistic, with the most agile units going first. During their turn, characters can be moved and positioned to face in four directions, and perform actions such as attacking, performing skills and using items. Each unit has health points (HP) and magic points (MP), with MP starting at zero and regenerating with each turn. MP are used to perform magic abilities, with more powerful spells costing more MP. When a Unit's HP is depleted, they are knocked out. Some battles are affected by changing weather, which impacts unit movements and abilities.

Unit abilities are tied to a character class-based Job system, with over fifty different Jobs; a unit's Job influences their abilities, and some Jobs are specific to the game's seven playable races. Job abilities are learned from armour and weapons equipped to a unit, with the types and number of skills learned enabling characters to switch Jobs. Jobs are drawn from the Tactics games and the wider Final Fantasy series, including close-quarters melee fighters such as Warrior and Soldier; ranged fighters such as the Archer and Sniper; and magic-based jobs such as White Mage, Black Mage and Summoner. The Summoner job allows a unit to summon Scions, powerful beings which deliver a cinematic attack which damages all enemies.

A feature carried over from Final Fantasy Tactics Advance is the Law system. Each battle is supervised by a Judge, which imposes a randomised restriction on the battle such as not healing party members or refraining from using certain spells. Complying with the Law results in the party earning additional rewards at the battle's end, while breaking the Law causes the Judge to abandon the battle and leave defeated units unable to be revived until the battle ends.

== Synopsis ==
=== Setting and characters ===
Tactics A2 is set in the fictional world of Ivalice. Rather than the dream version featured in Tactics Advance, Tactics A2 takes place in the real world of Ivalice, a setting shared with Final Fantasy Tactics and Final Fantasy XII; the opening uses a version of the town of St. Ivalice, the setting of Tactics Advance. Chronologically, Tactics A2 is set shortly after the events of Final Fantasy XII. The Ivalice of Tactics A2 is populated by seven races, five of which return from Tactics Advance. The five returning races are the human-like Humes; recurring series mascots Moogles, and Ivalice-specific races the Nou Mu, Viera, and Bangaa. The two new races are the Seeq from Final Fantasy XII, and the wholly new Gria.

The main protagonist is Luso Clemens, a young troublemaker native to the town of St. Ivalice who is magically transported to the land of Ivalice. Soon after arriving, he is rescued from monsters by Cid, leader of the small Clan Gully and a recurring Final Fantasy character. Luso is helped in his quest to return home by Adelle, a thief who eventually joins the Clan; and Hurdy, a moogle minstrel. Characters from Final Fantasy XII appear as cameos with exclusive Jobs. The characters are Vaan, the main protagonist of Final Fantasy XII, fellow protagonist Penelo, supporting character Al-Cid and the moogle Mont Blanc.

=== Plot ===
On the eve of leaving school for summer break, Luso is forced to stay at school and serve detention helping in the school library. Finding a half-empty book and writing his name in it as a prank, Luso is magically transported with the book into Ivalice. Landing in the midst of a battle between Clan Gully and a powerful monster, he is saved and helps in the battle once granted a job. Meeting Clan Gully's leader Cid, he explains his situation and Cid vows to return him to his home; Luso also offers to help the Clan during quests. During their time taking on quests, Luso meets the thief Adelle, who initially steals a payment before returning and joining the Clan, and the minstrel Hurdy. Luso eventually meets the mage Lezaford, who reveals that the book Luso still carries—which is recording his actions in Ivalice—can take him back to his world.

Going on a journey to discover more about the book, Clan Gully face off against the criminal group Khamja. They also battle the hand of a monster which emerges from a portal. While fighting one of their agents Illua sees the book glow and attacks it, but it deflects her attack and Illua is driven off. Lezaford then identifies the book as the "Grimoire of the Rift", having the power to open portals between worlds and consequently being highly dangerous; the monstrous hand Clan Gully fought off belongs to a beast called the Neukhia, which could be summoned into Ivalice using the Grimoire. Illua wishes to harness powers beyond the portals and seeks the Grimoire's destruction.

During his journey, Luso is forced to both act as representative for Clan Gully after Cid is injured on a mission, then confront a rogue Adelle and free her from Illua's control. During a final confrontation with Illua, a portal is opened and the Neukhia fully emerges, killing Illua before attacking the party. Luso's party defeats the Neukhia, and feels able to go home after bidding farewell to Clan Gully. Arriving back in the library, Luso encounters the school librarian—Mewt Randell, a major character from Tactics Advance. Believing Luso's tale, Randell allows Luso to go home. Post-credits scenes show Luso enjoying summer break, Cid and Adelle continuing to adventure with Clan Gully, and Hurdy becoming a world-famous minstrel.

== Development ==
Tactics A2 was developed by Square Enix, owners and main developers of the Final Fantasy franchise. The game forms part of the Ivalice Alliance, a series of games sharing the setting of Ivalice while taking place at different times in the land's history. The director was Yuichi Murasawa, who had directed the original Tactics Advance. Akitoshi Kawazu acted as executive producer, a role he shared with the other Ivalice Alliance projects. The producer was Hiroaki Kato, while Kyoko Kitahara acted as scenario and event director. Character designs were by Ryoma Ito, who also worked on Tactics Advance and Final Fantasy XII. The logo design was created by Akihiko Yoshida. Planning for Tactics A2 began due to positive fan reception and demand for a sequel to Tactics Advance, which was released for the Game Boy Advance (GBA) in 2003. The team also wanted to add new features, as the short development time of the original Tactics Advance prevented their inclusion. The team initially planned to develop the game for the GBA, cutting down on development time, and started producing a version for the system. After the Nintendo DS was launched to worldwide commercial success, Square Enix shifted the project from GBA to DS. Production for this version began in 2006, with active development being delayed due to Murasawa's commitment other projects. Like its predecessor, Tactics A2 was designed to be accessible to casual gamers while maintaining "serious narrative themes"; the team designed the game with the large casual gamer base of the DS in mind.

In contrast to the mature tone of Final Fantasy XII, Tactics A2's story was described as "light adventure" similar to Tactics Advance. The first story draft was much darker, with Kitahara setting the entire story in Ivalice. Luso was to have been living a carefree life in his village, with the story starting after an attack on the village left everyone but Luso dead. The team decided against this approach, going for the lighter tone of the final game. The sense of fun intended by the developers was thematically represented by the opening being set during the beginning of summer break, and reinforced by Luso's attitude to his situation. The characters from Final Fantasy XII were planned on from an early stage. Kato initially wanted Balthier to be included, but Kitahara repeatedly refused. Wanting characters who could appeal to long-term fans and series newcomers, the team incorporated Vaan and Penelo, with Vaan's attitude reflecting his character development across Final Fantasy XII and its sequel Revenant Wings. Al-Cid originally had a minor role, but he was later turned into a recruitable character.

The biggest change from developing Tactics Advance was the dual screens of the DS, which enabled menu displays to be spread out and increase the visual spectacle of some sequences. The team's aim was to make a "character-building game with a twist", promoting variety and depth with character customization. The quest variety was also expanded compared to Tactics Advance, as Murasawa regretted the lack of variety in the original game. The summoned monsters were taken directly from Final Fantasy XII, and the team used both screens for their attacks to convey their scale. Initially planned to be purely cinematic attacks, the effects team successfully created a version which used real-time graphics and still conveyed the summons' scale and power. When creating the gameplay, the team carried over multiple mechanics from Tactics Advance, while also adjusting elements such as the leveling system and Law mechanics. For the original Japanese release, the team decided not to use the DS touchscreen as it did not fit in with their design plans. The Western versions added touchscreen-based stylus control. The team also included a large number of tutorials, further catering to a casual audience.

=== Art design ===
Ito came on board the project after finishing his work on Final Fantasy XII, being invited to join the project by Murasawa. Luso's design was based on Kitahara's comparison of the character with Tom Sawyer. When designing Luso, Ito decided to give him a red hat to give him a heroic look, and made yellow a dominant color in his design. Luso was originally red all over, but upon seeing the developing background scenes Ito changed the main color to yellow. The character Adelle was designed based on design documents by Kitahara, with her lithe physique and bow ribbon reflecting her nickname of "Adelle the Cat". The character Cid—the first non-human version in the Final Fantasy series—went through multiple revisions as Ito created designs based on Kitahara's directions. He first designed him to be very thin, then based his next design on an American bison. His final design blended the bison design with other elements, with his clothing using a cowboy style and common South American colors. Lezaford's design used a staff and cloak to convey his status as a wise mage, which his features being similar to Cid due to being from the same race.

Many of the Job designs were carried over from Tactics Advance with minor revisions, so the new Job outfits were designed to fall in line with the earlier designs. Rather than starting from full illustrations, Ito first created many of the basic jobs as pixel art. Designing the Seeq race proved challenging due to showing a lot of skin. For the new Gria race, Murasawa asked Ito to make them moe, a term Ito described as "sort of like cute, but different". Ito's design for Vaan had him looking more mature than his appearances in Final Fantasy XII and its sequel, with the main difference being a shirt covering his chest. Vaan's appearance, which was supposed to mirror that of Balthier, was suggested by Kato. While the rest of the game's artwork was dominated by Ito, the logo design was done by Yoshida, who had previously worked on Tactics and XII. Yoshida's design combined the figure of a Judge with an open book.

=== Music ===
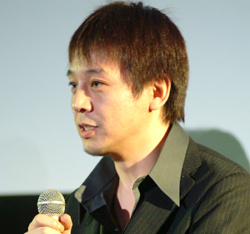
Hitoshi Sakimoto composed and produced the soundtrack for Tactics A2.

The music for Tactics A2 was composed by Hitoshi Sakimoto, who previously worked on Tactics Advance. Sakimoto also produced the soundtrack, in addition to arrangements. Additional arrangements were done by Masaharu Iwata, Mitsuhiro Kaneda, Kimihiro Abe and Noriyuki Kamikura of Sakimoto's music studio Basiscape. The soundtrack included themes from Tactics and Final Fantasy XII by Sakimoto, Kaneda, Kaori Ohkoshi and Ayako Sasou. An arranged version of the main theme of Tactics Advance by Nobuo Uematsu was also used. Sakimoto said that, including new and returning themes, the soundtrack had over sixty songs.

As with Tactics Advance, Sakimoto moved away from his typical heavy style to create a more light-hearted score. While he knew what to do, he felt under pressure due to fan expectation. The opening feel of the game was a bright summer environment, which impacted Sakimoto's choice of musical feel. Due to the increased hardware of the DS, Sakimoto could incorporate higher-quality music into the game compared to Tactics Advance. While the battle tracks were the first to be started, they were the last to be finalised as Sakimoto kept making adjustments when all the other themes were complete. To maintain a high quality for battle tracks, Sakimoto used sound streaming, bringing the music's quality close to that of a CD release. A two-disc soundtrack album was released on November 21, 2007.

== Release ==
Tactics A2 was announced in December 2006 alongside The War of the Lions, a remake of Final Fantasy Tactics for PlayStation Portable. As part of the cross-game promotion, Tactics A2 protagonist Luso appears in War of the Lions, with the decision being made when the Ivalice Alliance was first announced. The game was released in Japan on October 25, 2007.

A North American and PAL-region versions were released in 2008. The localization was handled by Kajiya Productions, a company led by translators Alexander O. Smith and Joseph Reeder; Smith and Reeder were veterans of previous Square Enix titles, having worked on the acclaimed localizations for Final Fantasy XII and Vagrant Story. The game was released in North America on June 24, and in Europe on June 27.

== Reception ==
Reception

Aggregate score
Aggregator	Score
Metacritic	80/100 (47 reviews)

Review scores
Publication	Score
1Up.com	B+
Eurogamer	7/10
Famitsu	34/40
Game Informer	8.75/10
GamePro	4/5
GameSpot	7/10
IGN	9/10
Official Nintendo Magazine	87%

During its first week on sale, Tactics A2 reached first place in gaming charts, selling over 142,000 units; these sales put it level with debut sales of War of the Lions, and the only title that week to sell over 100,000 units. The following week, the game dropped to third place with further sales of 51,000, bringing total sales to 193,000 units. As of 2009, the game had sold 670,000 units worldwide; 310,000 were sold in Japan, 240,000 in North America, and 120,000 in Europe.

The gameplay was praised by Famitsu for its relaxed difficulty compared to Tactics Advance and large amount of content, while 1UP.com's James Mielke praised the depth of gameplay as the game's strongest feature. Simon Parkin, writing for Eurogamer, called the game a "straightforward interpretation of the [tactical RPG] genre", enjoying several elements of the gameplay and calling it one of the genre's best examples on the DS. Game Informer's Joe Juba positively noted the greater range of strategic options compared to earlier Tactics titles. Will Herring of GamePro praised the amount of content and breadth of gameplay freedom. GameSpot's Shiva Stella enjoyed the amount of content despite general pacing issues, while IGN writer Daemon Hatfield praised the overall depth while noting a lack of innovation. Fred Dutton of Official Nintendo Magazine generally praised the gameplay, although he noted that the game's scale and depth could be quite daunting. Critics had differing views on the Law system; some praised its challenge, while others found it needlessly restrictive or an unwanted element from Tactics Advance. The slow pace of battle, menu design and lack of a rotating camera were commonly criticized.

Mielke felt that the pacing was inferior to fellow DS tactical RPG Advance Wars: Days of Ruin. Parkin called the graphics among the best on the DS at the time, while Juba praised the general graphic designs. Hatfield said: "Excellent translation, engaging characters, memorable tunes, and a dazzling art style come together to make a great package". Dutton called the presentation "top notch" and praised the musical score; these sentiments were echoed by Stella in her review.

Famitsu felt that the game's narrative development was "unsatisfactory". Mielke negatively noted a lack of mature story elements compared to the original Tactics or Tactics Advance, while Parkin found the initial premise cliche and noted a lack of substantial story after the opening segment. Juba said that the story "certainly won't keep [the player] enthralled", and Herring found it a suitable backdrop to gameplay despite its low quality. Stella called the plot "generic", while Dutton felt that the light tone of the story was at odds with the gameplay.

== Legacy ==
Tactics A2 was awarded Best Strategy Game for the Nintendo DS by IGN for their 2008 video game awards. At the 2008 National Academy of Video Game Trade Reviewers awards, Tactics A2 was among those nominated in the "Game Strategy" category. RPGFan named the game "Strategy RPG of the Year: Handheld" during their "Games of 2008" feature ahead of Yggdra Union.

The artwork and character jobs of Tactics A2 were reused by Square Enix for Crystal Defenders, a series of titles released principally for mobile and covering turn-based strategy for its first two entries and tower defense for the third. Like Tactics A2, the Crystal Defenders series uses the true Ivalice as its setting. The Crystal Defenders games were released between 2008 and 2009, with the second and third entries releasing internationally. Music from Tactics A2 was used for the Crystal Defenders series. The Tactics A2 jobs were later used in the mobile title Final Fantasy Tactics S.
