= Final Fantasy Tactics: The War of the Lions =

2007 video game

- Developers: Tose; Square Enix; Hi Corporation (iOS / Android)
- Publisher: Square Enix
- Designer: Hiroyuki Ito
- Artists: Hiroshi Minagawa; Akihiko Yoshida; Hideo Minaba
- Composers: Hitoshi Sakimoto; Masaharu Iwata
- Series: Final Fantasy; Ivalice Alliance
- Platforms: PlayStation Portable, iOS, Android
- Release: May 10, 2007: PlayStation Portable; JP: May 10, 2007; EU: October 5, 2007; AU: October 8, 2007; NA: October 9, 2007 iOS; WW: August 4, 2011 Android; JP: February 14, 2013; WW: June 4, 2015
- Genre: Tactical role-playing
- Modes: Single-player, multiplayer

Final Fantasy Tactics: The War of the Lions (Japanese: ファイナルファンタジータクティクス 獅子戦争, Hepburn: Fainaru Fantajī Takutikusu Shishi Sensō) is a 2007 tactical role-playing game developed and published by Square Enix for the PlayStation Portable (PSP). The game is an updated version of Final Fantasy Tactics made for the PlayStation, which was released in 1997.

The War of the Lions is the second announced game in Square Enix's "Ivalice Alliance" series of video games set in the Ivalice fictional world. The first is Final Fantasy XII: Revenant Wings (a sequel to Final Fantasy XII) and the third is Final Fantasy Tactics A2: Grimoire of the Rift (both of which were released on Nintendo DS). Ivalice (during the setting of the game) has technology in line with the late medieval era of human history along with the typical magic and supernatural abilities found in most Final Fantasy games. Players control a mercenary named Ramza who finds himself embroiled in a civil war and an ancient demonic evil that has begun to take hold over the world. A noble by birth, he is forced to re-evaluate his opinion of commoners when his lowborn best friend starts a revolution against the ruling powers of Ivalice.

The game was overhauled during development to take advantage of the PSP's screen ratio and technical abilities which resulted in new cutscenes, the capacity for multiplayer, and other features. War of the Lions also includes new playable characters from other Final Fantasy titles, such as Balthier from Final Fantasy XII and Luso Clemens from Final Fantasy Tactics A2: Grimoire of the Rift, as well as returning favorite Cloud Strife from Final Fantasy VII, who was playable in the original release of the game. The War of the Lions received strong reviews upon its release and has since been adapted for mobile phones and tablet devices.

== Content and gameplay ==
Final Fantasy Tactics: The War of the Lions is a turn-based tactical role-playing game. Set within the fictional world of Ivalice, the game follows a war between the Kingdom of Ivalice and its neighbor Ordalia, told as a historical document relating the deeds of an extensive cast drawn from both sides of the conflict. While preserving the main narrative of Final Fantasy Tactics with updated localization, War of the Lions also features tie-in references to other games set within Ivalice, including Balthier from Final Fantasy XII, and Luso Clemens from Final Fantasy Tactics A2: Grimoire of the Rift.

The combat of War of the Lions can be compared with board games such as chess, with each piece corresponding to a party member in Ramza's current roster of fighters. Each fighter may move about the grid-like board in accordance with their move allotment as well as attack enemy fighters or activate more complex abilities. The terrain of each map dictates the range and mobility of the warriors. Ramza's soldiers can each equip a job in the Final Fantasy tradition, from standard swordsmen and archers to magic specialists to even more exotic positions, like the dragoon and dancer. Fulfilling actions during a battle grants experience and job points to each character, the latter of which can be used to purchase new abilities. There are 22 jobs available in The War of the Lions. Once a character has learned a skill from a job, they have permanent access to it, although only one primary group of skills is available at a time and is job-dependent. Many abilities, such as those related to movement or being struck by an enemy, can still be equipped if the character later changes jobs. The game also features permadeath — if a character is incapacitated from excessive damage and is not healed within several turns, they are permanently dead and cannot be used again in battle.

Outside of battles, players can move around on an overworld map. This is not free movement like other Final Fantasy games; instead, Ramza can only go from point to point on the map. Crossing a wilderness location may lead to a random battle. In cities and towns, the players can buy new equipment, recruit fresh soldiers, and send party members out on automated missions to earn cash and other rewards. Later in the game, the player can earn additional rewards by poaching creatures during battles.

Another addition to the game is a wireless multiplayer mode, both for cooperative and competitive play. In competitive play, opposing teams may place traps onto the battlefield, and these traps are hidden from the opponent. To ease identification, teams are assigned colors. The battle ends after a set number of rounds, and the team with the most remaining HP is declared the winner. The winner may then receive an item randomly generated from treasure chests. Multiplayer is not included in the iOS version, however.

== Development ==
Final Fantasy Tactics: The War of the Lions was revealed in December 2006, in the Weekly Shonen Jump magazine as a PlayStation Portable port of Final Fantasy Tactics. The magazine stated additions of cel-shaded full motion videos, and extra job classes among other new features. The title was originally made for the PlayStation console in 1997. Takamasa Shiba, the remakes game's producer, said that Square Enix decided to "re-envision the game a decade later". Because of the extensive gameplay and deep storyline, the PlayStation version would "compel players to spend hours playing it". Shiba cited this, as well as the system's portability, as the main reasons why Square chose to develop for the PlayStation Portable. The subtitle of The War of the Lions was chosen as it describes "the backdrop for the story of the two main characters Ramza and Delita", as well as illustrating the multiplayer gameplay.

Following the trend of Final Fantasy video games on PlayStation systems, The War of the Lions features full motion video during certain scenes. These videos are rendered using cel-shading, a technique giving the illusion of hand drawn animation. These cutscenes were collaboratively animated by Japanese animation studios Kamikaze Douga and Studio Anima. Because of the PlayStation Portable's screen size, the game features a 16:9 aspect ratio, as opposed to the previous 4:3. The developers added sequences with visual arts illustrated by Akihiko Yoshida, and the game is complete with new episodes and cutscenes that were not in the original title. Developers wanted the game to suit both new players and players that have experienced the original title. The cut scenes were also added to help players become immersed in the culture and history of Ivalice and "War of the Lions". The Zodiac battle system was used in an international release of Final Fantasy XII due to both games taking place in the world of Ivalice and that the "War of the Lions" battle director is also the director of Final Fantasy XII's international release and liked the combat system. Luso from Final Fantasy Tactics A2: Grimoire of the Rift was added to connect the game to the Ivalice Alliance game series.

New character classes were chosen at the beginning of development, with a staff member who loved the original Tactics title assigned to balance the new jobs within the game. The new classes are the Onion Knight, taken from Final Fantasy III, and the Dark Knight, which was previously only available to one character, Gaffgarion. The Dark Knight in the remake has additional abilities and thus the original Dark Knight class was renamed to "Fell Knight" in the English localization. The Fell Knight class is still unique to Gaffgarion.

One of the new cutscenes in The War of the Lions. The developers chose to go with cel-shaded animation, giving the impression of pencil-drawn imagery.

The North American localization of The War of the Lions has full audio voice acting for the video sequences in the game. The slowdown and sound downgrade, though acknowledged by the localizers, was not a priority for them to fix, being stated as "out of their hands". Various reviewers have differing opinions about how the slowdown issue has been addressed; one of the previews of the North American version claims that the slowdown has been reduced, stating that "now the technical issues are about on par with the minor slowdown exhibited in the PS1 release and are no longer distracting", while others claimed that the slowdowns still "occur when performing attacks or spells in battle".

Because of vocal criticism of the original English language translation, a whole new translation was commissioned for the remake. The PlayStation Portable producer Akitoshi Kawazu described the game as having "an incredible amount of text" versus an ordinary RPG. Translating the game's script was assigned to Joe Reeder, who pulled in fellow translator Tom Slattery after becoming impressed with some of his internal work at Square Enix. Both worked on the game, alternating between each other translating scenes until Reeder had to leave the project to work on Final Fantasy XII: Revenant Wings and Slattery became head translator. The translation work took six to seven days a week at twelve to thirteen hour stretches. To incorporate the game deeper into the world of Ivalice, the new English translation changed words to standard Final Fantasy terms and spellings such as "magick", "Dragoon", and "Mystic". The Church of Glabados, while presented in the PlayStation translation as monotheistic like Christianity, was re-translated to be more accurate to the original text with a polytheistic belief system.

=== Other platforms ===
A PlayStation Network version was released on March 9, 2011, in Japan, and in North America on July 18. In response to player's requests that Square Enix release more of their catalogue on mobile phones, a project to port "War of the Lions" commenced. Rebuilding the game for a touch interface and not having the PlayStation Portables shoulder buttons took much time and "trial and error", relying on the work done to adapt previous Final Fantasy titles. Certain iOS features were not supported including Game Center since the game is not "inherently competitive".

The War of the Lions for iOS was released in 2011, with the iPhone version released on August 4. An iPad version was released on February 23, 2012. An Android port was released through the Square Enix Market on February 14, 2013, in Japan, featuring enhanced graphics, a higher draw speed, and controls optimized for a touchscreen. An iOS update was promised, and when released also included multiple iCloud save slot support. The Android version was globally launched on Google Play on June 4, 2015, without cloud saving.

== Reception ==
Reception

Aggregate scores
Aggregator	Score
GameRankings	PSP: 88%
Metacritic	PSP: 88/100 iOS: 72/100

Review scores
Publication	Score
Eurogamer	9 / 10
Game Informer	9.5 / 10
GamePro	4.25/5
GameSpot	8 / 10
GameSpy	5/5
GamesRadar+	9 / 10
GameTrailers	9.2 / 10
GameZone	9 / 10
IGN	9 / 10
PlayStation Official Magazine – UK	10 / 10
Play	9 / 10
PlayStation: The Official Magazine	9.5 / 10
TouchArcade	iOS: 3.5/5 (iPad) 3.5/5

The War of the Lions reached the top of Japanese gaming charts, and sold 100,000 copies in the first month of release in the United States. The game was the 53rd best-selling game of 2007 in Japan at 301,796 copies according to Famitsu. The Ultimate Hits edition sold an additional 19,488 copies in Japan.

As of December 2007, The War of the Lions on the PSP has a score of 88/100 at the aggregate review site Metacritic based on 41 reviews, 88% at GameRankings based on 47 reviews. In comparison, the original Final Fantasy Tactics scored 83 from 12 reviews at Metacritic. Critics in general were pleased that the game had been remade, as it was considered a cult hit in its original incarnation but copies had become difficult to find. The War of the Lion's tactical gameplay was widely praised as deep and engaging, as battles could proceed along any number of lines depending on party composition and player strategy. Reviewers liked the focus on player choice on the battlefield, such as approaching an engagement with defense in mind, or alternatively hitting enemies hard and fast in a kind of blitzkrieg. The Job system, especially its complexity, customization, and ability to influence battles, was commended. GameTrailers wrote: "Even up to now, Final Fantasy Tactics job classing structure is still one of the best the genre has seen; a feature-rich and flexible system matched only by its equally complex battle engine". The new jobs were also appreciated.

The War of the Lions' new translation was frequently commented upon. Reviewers felt that while its narrative was florid, even Shakespearean, it was an improvement over the original, which was described as confusing and convoluted. The story itself was also lauded for its depth and maturity, although commentators did note that its large cast of characters was occasionally difficult to follow. The new cel-shaded cutscenes were very popular and described as "magical", "beautiful", and "outstanding". There were some comments that the sprites, textures, and environmental visuals in general had not been improved, with the exception of new spell animations. The sound was both praised and criticized, with observations about beautiful music but grating camera sound effects.

The negative comments about The War of the Lions focused on the game's slowdown during battles and its difficulty. Some party actions slow down the game's framerate and decrease the audio quality, becoming most apparent when casting spells or using special abilities that require different lighting effects. Despite the move from disc-only to the option of playing via PlayStation Network download, the slowdown remains, as confirmed by PlayStation LifeStyle's review. The difficulty was widely considered punishing and perhaps discouraging to new players. Eurogamer's Rob Fahey said: "[The game's] difficulty curve is somewhat peculiar - to put it charitably...We certainly encountered some battles that were ludicrously easy, and a couple (especially early on) so hard that we had to re-equip and fight a few random battles before trying again".

The iOS version was less well received than the PSP edition. While reviewers echoed positive comments about the storyline and gameplay, they were displeased with the removal of multiplayer, graphical issues that still had not been fixed, and most importantly, the price point at initial release. At the time, it was the most expensive game ever released on the operating system. USgamer on the other hand listed the remake as one of the best ever made.

Final Fantasy Tactics: The War of the Lions has received acclaim in more recent years. In 2022, GamesRadar hailed Final Fantasy Tactics: The War of the Lions as the 11th best PSP game ever made. In 2023, Cultured Vultures ranked Final Fantasy Tactics: The War of the Lions at #1 in their list of the best PSP games of all time.
