= Final Fantasy Tactics =

1997 video game

- North American box art
- Developer: Square
- Publishers: JP: Square; NA: Sony Computer Entertainment; The Ivalice Chronicles; Square Enix Creative Studio III
- Director: Yasumi Matsuno
- Producer: Hironobu Sakaguchi
- Designer: Hiroyuki Ito
- Programmer: Taku Murata
- Artists: Hiroshi Minagawa; Akihiko Yoshida; Hideo Minaba
- Writer: Yasumi Matsuno
- Composers: Hitoshi Sakimoto; Masaharu Iwata
- Series: Final Fantasy; Ivalice Alliance
- Platforms: PlayStation; The Ivalice Chronicles; Nintendo Switch; Nintendo Switch 2; PlayStation 4; PlayStation 5; Windows; Xbox Series X/S
- Release: Original: JP: June 20, 1997; NA: January 28, 1998; The Ivalice Chronicles; September 30, 2025
- Genre: Tactical role-playing
- Mode: Single-player

Final Fantasy Tactics (Note: Japanese: ファイナルファンタジータクティクス, Hepburn: Fainaru Fantajī Takutikusu) is a 1997 tactical role-playing game developed and published by Square for the PlayStation. It was released in Japan in June 1997 and in North America in January 1998 by Sony Computer Entertainment. It is the first game of the Tactics sub-series within the Final Fantasy franchise, and the first entry set in the fictional world later known as Ivalice. The story follows Ramza Beoulve, a highborn cadet placed in the middle of a military conflict known as The Lion War, where two opposing noble factions are coveting the throne of the kingdom.

Production was begun in 1995 by Yasumi Matsuno, a newcomer who had created the Ogre Battle series at Quest Corporation. Matsuno's wish was for an accessible tactical game with a storyline focusing on class-based conflict and the rewriting of history. Matsuno acted as director and writer, Final Fantasy creator Hironobu Sakaguchi was producer, and the battles were designed by Hiroyuki Ito. Multiple other staff members were veterans of the Ogre Battle series, including artists Hiroshi Minagawa and Akihiko Yoshida, and composers Hitoshi Sakimoto and Masaharu Iwata. The game received critical acclaim and has become a cult classic since its release. The PlayStation version sold over one million units in Japan during 1997, and over 2.4 million worldwide by August 2011. It has been cited as one of the greatest video games of all time.

The world of Ivalice became the setting for multiple other titles, including other Tactics games, and the 2006 mainline entry Final Fantasy XII. An enhanced port of the game, Final Fantasy Tactics: The War of the Lions, was released in 2007 as part of the Ivalice Alliance project. An expanded remaster for eighth and ninth generation consoles and Windows, subtitled The Ivalice Chronicles, was released on September 30, 2025.

== Gameplay ==
An example of the isometric battlefields found in the game. The blue panels on the ground mark where the Wizard (with straw hat and "AT" icon) can move to.

Final Fantasy Tactics is a tactical role-playing game in which players follow the story of protagonist Ramza Beoulve. The game features two modes of play: battles and the world map. Battles take place on three-dimensional, isometric fields. Characters move on a battlefield composed of square tiles; movement and action ranges are determined by the character's statistics and job class. The battlefield also factors in elements such as terrain and weather to determine strategic advantages and disadvantages during clashes. Battles are turn-based; a unit may act when its Charge Time (CT) reaches 100 and increased once every CT unit (a measure of time in battles) by an amount equal to the unit's speed statistic. During battle, whenever a unit performs an action successfully, it gains experience points (EXP) and job points (JP). Actions can include magical attacks, physical attacks, or using an item. Hit points (HP) of enemy units are also visible to the player (except in the case of certain bosses), allowing the player to know how much damage they still have to inflict on a particular unit.

In the world map, the player moves on predefined paths connecting the towns and battle points. When the character icon is over a town, a menu can be opened with several options: "Bar" for taking sidequest job offers, "Shop" for buying supplies and equipment, and "Soldier Office" for recruiting new characters. Later in the game, some towns contain "Fur Shops" for obtaining items by way of poaching monsters. Random battles happen in pre-set locations on the map, marked in green. Passing over one of these spots may result in a random encounter.

Final Fantasy Tactics offers a wide selection of Job Classes. The selected character in the center of the circle is currently a Wizard.

Tactics features a character class system, which allows players to customize characters into various roles. The game makes extensive use of most of the original character classes seen in earlier Final Fantasy games, including Summoners, Wizards (Black Mages), Priests (White Mages), Monks, Lancers (Dragoons), and Thieves. New recruits start out as either a Squire or a Chemist, the base classes for warrior and magician jobs, respectively. The game features twenty jobs accessible by normal characters.

The JP rewarded in battle are used to learn new abilities within each job class. Accumulating enough JP results in a job level up; new jobs are unlocked by attaining a certain level in the current job class (for instance, to become a Priest or Wizard, the unit must first attain Job Level 2 as a Chemist), which also allows the character to gain more JP in that class in battles. Once all the abilities of a job class have been learned, the class is "Mastered". A soldier in a specific Job always has its innate skill equipped (Wizards always have "Black Magic", Knights always have "Battle Skill") but a second job-skill slot and several other ability slots (Reaction, Support, and Movement) can be filled with any skill the particular soldier has learned.

== Plot ==
=== Setting ===
The story takes place in the kingdom of Ivalice, inspired by the Middle Ages. The kingdom is located in a peninsula surrounded by sea on the north, west and south, with a headland south of the landmass. It is heavily populated by human beings, although intelligent monsters can be found living in less populated areas. Magic is predominant in the land, although ruins and artifacts indicated that the past populace had relied on machinery, such as airships and robots. Ivalice's neighbors are the kingdom of Ordalia in the east and Romanda, a military nation to the north. While the three nations share common royal bloodlines, major wars have taken place between them. An influential religious institution known as the Glabados Church heads the dominant faith, centering around a religious figure known as Saint Ajora.

The story takes place after Ivalice ended its war with the two nations in what is known as the Fifty Years War, and is facing economic problems and political strife. The king of Ivalice has recently died and his heir is an infant, so a regent is needed to rule in place of the prince. The kingdom is split between two candidates named Duke Goltana, represented by the Black Lion, and Duke Larg, symbolized by the White Lion. The conflict leads to what is known in the game as the Lion War. Behind this backdrop is a revelation by the game's historian Alazlam J. Durai, who seeks to reveal the story of an unknown character whose role in the Lion War was major but was covered up by the kingdom's church.

=== Characters ===
Most of the game's plot is portrayed from Ramza's perspective, who is the player character of the story. He is joined by a cadre of characters which include Delita Hyral, his closest friend, and Agrias Oaks, the knight in charge of protecting Princess Ovelia. He is introduced to various factions of the Lion War; the most prominent are those of Duke Goltana and Duke Larg, who both want to become the guardian of Ivalice's monarch and are engaged in a war with each other. The story progresses to include characters from the Glabados Church, which has been controlling Ivalice silently and engineering the war in question.

As the game progresses, players are able to recruit generic player characters and customize them using the Job system of the Final Fantasy series. Several battles also feature characters controlled via the game's A.I., which may be recruited later in the game according to the story proper. The characters were designed by Akihiko Yoshida, who was also in charge of the illustration and character designs for Tactics Ogre, and then went on to do the same for Final Fantasy Tactics Advance, Final Fantasy XII, and Vagrant Story.

=== Story ===
The story is presented as a historical account by Alazlam J. Durai based on recently discovered documents dubbed the "Durai Report", written by his ancestor Olan Durai. Ivalice is recovering from the Fifty Year War against Ordalia. After the death of its ruler, Princess Ovelia and Prince Orinas are both candidates for the throne. The former is supported by Duke Goltana of the Black Lion, and the latter by Queen Ruvelia and her brother, Duke Larg of the White Lion. The two groups engage in battles in the Lion War. Nobles and commoners regard each other negatively and many commoners joined the Corpse Brigade to fight against the nobles' soldiers.

Ramza, part of the noble Beoulve family of knights, and Delita, his childhood friend who was an ordinary commoner, witness the murder of Delita's sister during an uprising. This causes Delita and Ramza to abandon their ties to the nobility. Ramza joins a mercenary group, led by Gafgarion, who protects Princess Ovelia from being hunted by both sides of the Lion War. Delita joins Goltana's forces. They are reunited when Gafgarion attempts to take Ovelia to Duke Larg. Agrias suggests visiting Cardinal Delacroix of the Glabados Church to protect Ovelia. Along the way, Ramza meets Mustadio, a machinist in possession of a holy relic called the Zodiac Stone. Hunted by a trading company for the power it contains, Mustadio also seeks Delacroix's intervention.

Ramza discovers that High Confessor Marcel Funebris and the church used the legend of the holy Zodiac Braves to gather the Zodiac Stones and instigated the Lion War. To prevent Ramza's interference, Delacroix uses the stone to transform into a Lucavi demon and Ramza defeats him. Ramza is regarded as a heretic by the church and he is chased by the Knights Templar, the soldiers of the church who are hunting the Zodiac Stones. He acquires proof of the Church's lies about Saint Ajora, a central figure in the religion, and attempts to use it along with the Zodiac Stone to reveal the organization's plot.

The two sides in the Lion War face off in a major battle that results in the deaths of Larg and Goltana. Ramza stops the battle and rescues the general, Count Cidolfus Orlandeau, though the Church eliminates the two leaders to secure its control over Ivalice. Ramza discovers that the Knights Templar are possessed by the Lucavi, who are seeking to resurrect their leader Ultima, and they needed bloodshed and a suitable body to complete the resurrection. Alma, Ramza's sister, is to serve as the host for Ultima's incarnation. Ultima is resurrected and Ramza and his allies succeed in destroying her and escape Ivalice.

In the epilogue, Delita marries Ovelia and becomes the King of Ivalice, while Ramza and Alma fake their deaths and go into hiding. Ovelia distrusts Delita, leading to a confrontation where they stab each other; their fates are left ambiguous in the game. Closing text from Alazlam reveals Olan Durai, who encountered Ramza several times, compiled the Durai Report and sought to reveal the Church's complicity, but he was burned as a heretic and his papers confiscated. His descendent Alazlam hopes now that Ramza's role in the Lion Wars will be remembered in full.

== Development ==
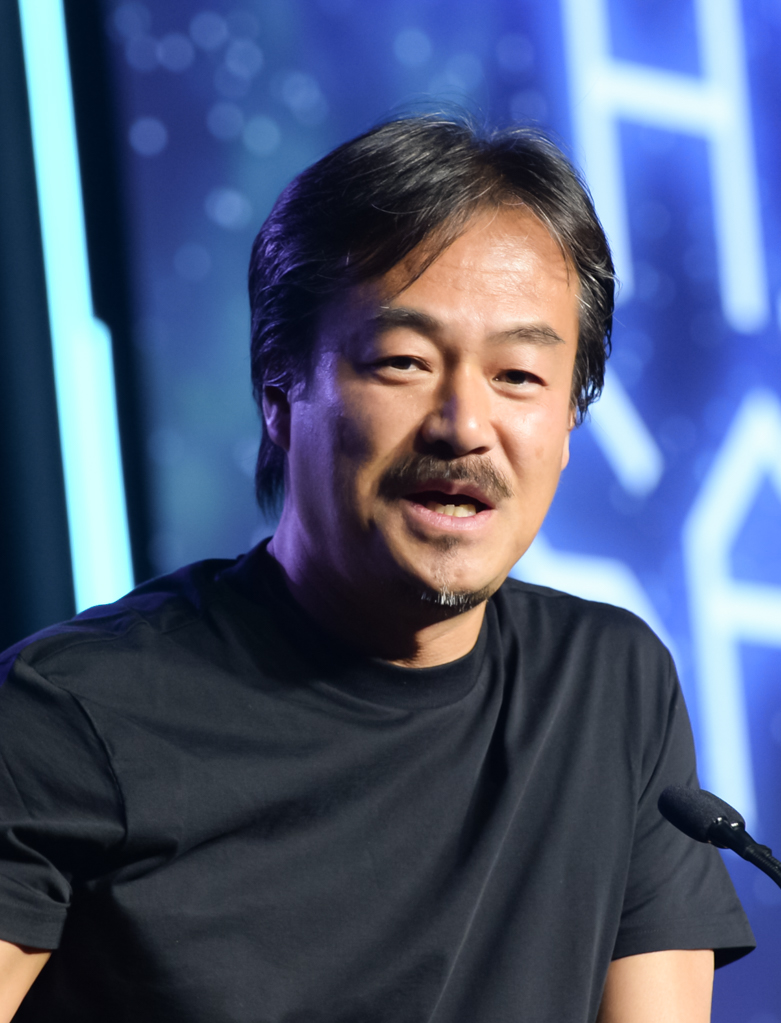
Hironobu Sakaguchi conceived the idea of Final Fantasy Tactics.

Tactics was conceived in 1993 by Final Fantasy series creator Hironobu Sakaguchi, who is a fan of the tactical role-playing genre. Due to his heavy involvement with the mainline series, he was unable to realize it at the time. Production finally began at the end of 1995 under Yasumi Matsuno, who until that year had worked at Quest Corporation on the Ogre Battle series, resigning once work was completed on Tactics Ogre: Let Us Cling Together and bringing several of its staff over to Square. During this period, Square had broken its long-standing development partnership with Nintendo and moved their game projects over to Sony's PlayStation.

Matsuno acted as director and lead scenario writer. Sakaguchi was the game's producer. The lead programmer was Taku Murata, who had previously worked on the Mana series. Matsuno described the working environment at Square as more democratic than at Quest, with a greater ability for the whole staff to contribute design ideas. The art design was a collaborative effort led by Tactics Ogre veterans Hiroshi Minagawa and Akihiko Yoshida, with additional character designs and artwork by Hideo Minaba and Eiichiro Nakatsu. Contrasting against the polished CGI aesthetic of Final Fantasy VII, the team wanted a hand-drawn artstyle. The opening and closing cinematics were created by Western company Animatek International.

=== Design ===
Matsuno's prototype was originally closer to Ogre Battle: The March of the Black Queen, a real-time strategy title with similar 2D graphics. Some sample images were produced, but this concept was then scrapped. For the final game, Matsuno aimed for a tactical RPG that would be accessible, something he originally aimed for with the Ogre Battle titles and later felt he had failed to accomplish with Tactics. When deciding how to differentiate Tactics from his earlier title, he placed a focus on individual character growth similar to the main series, contrasting against the army-based simulation of Tactics Ogre while keeping its chess-inspired gameplay. While Matsuno designed most of the rest of the game systems, due to staff shortages and needing to focus on the scenario the battle system was designed by Hiroyuki Ito. Ito disliked tactical RPGs of the time, growing bored with their mechanics, so designed the battle system to be engaging and feel fast and exciting. Matsuno had to push against Ito's wish to simplify the class system. The level design, which used compact diorama-style levels, was chosen to allow the intended 60 frames per second, carrying over the smooth gameplay experience gamers expected from the genre. The small scale of battles also reinforced the personal nature of the game's narrative conflicts. Level design and mastering continued until a week before the game shipped.

Under Matsuno's direction, the game's design strayed significantly from Sakaguchi's original concept, particularly in its narrative tone. Ito at the time described a wish for the narrative to emulate "a sense of swashbuckling heroism". Matsuno's aim was to create a Final Fantasy-themed morality tale. Matsuno stated that the game's thematic use of class-based society was derived from his experiences within game production companies, observing their hierarchy and how senior designers were treated as royalty. The story premise of a long-suppressed account of ancient history was inspired by the discovery of the Dead Sea Scrolls, and the story of The Name of the Rose. Its themes of economic and class inequality were inspired by the Lost Decades following the Japanese bubble economy, which Matsuno described as a time when "many [in Japan] were robbed of hope". The specific themes were represented by Ramza, who sought to upend the social order, and Delita, who used it to gain power. For Tactics, Matsuno created an entire new world dubbed Ivalice, which he would use in multiple later projects. Ivalice was designed as a complex setting with a deep historical background. He described it as a blank canvas on which he and later others could create narratives. While some aspects of the ending were left ambiguous, Matsuno considered the narrative complete on its own.

=== Music ===
During its preplanning phase, the music was going to be in an upbeat style in line with the mainline Final Fantasy series. Due to its portrayal of people fighting each other rather than fighting monsters, Matsuno felt upbeat music was wrong. The original score was written by Hitoshi Sakimoto and Masaharu Iwata, both veterans of the Ogre Battle series. Sakimoto, who was brought on board the project by Matsuno, was advised by both Matsuno and established Final Fantasy composer Nobuo Uematsu not to worry about keeping to the style of the main Final Fantasy series. Iwata described the game as a "giant project" to work on, and he received a lot of help from other staff members at Square. Several tracks were inspired by the game's storyline and concept art, with some track names being chosen by Sakimoto based on first impressions of relevant characters. Sakimoto described his music for the game as "bright and cheerful tunes", carrying themes of hope and love. Sakimoto and Iwata worked separately on their own tracks. The album was first released on two compact discs by DigiCube on June 21, 1997, and was re-released by Square Enix on March 24, 2006.

== Versions and re-releases ==
Tactics was first released in Japan on June 20, 1997. It came bundled with a demo disc for SaGa Frontier. The English localization was partly outsourced, with the other part of translation and localization being handled by Square Soft's Michael Baskett. Baskett started writing the script in an "Olde English style," but this was beginning to impact the game's understandability and made characters sound alike, so it was toned down in the final script. It was released in North America on January 28, 1998, by Sony Computer Entertainment America, who, at the time, acted as Square's Western publisher for the platform. It was re-released as part of the Square's Millennium Collection. This series of games was released only in Japan, and each title is bought with a set of related merchandise. Final Fantasy Tactics was sold on June 29, 2000, along with titles such as Saga Frontier, Saga Frontier 2, Brave Fencer Musashi, Front Mission 3, Ehrgeiz and Legend of Mana.

In 2001, four years after its release, Final Fantasy Tactics was selected as part of the Sony Greatest Hits line of re-releases. Final Fantasy Tactics also became part of Ultimate Hits, Square Enix's main budget range available in Japan.

=== The War of the Lions ===
A PlayStation Portable version of Final Fantasy Tactics, entitled Final Fantasy Tactics: The War of the Lions was released on May 10, 2007, in Japan, and later across all regions. It is the second game announced as part of the Ivalice Alliance. The game features an updated version of Final Fantasy Tactics, along with new features including in-game cutscenes, new characters, and multiplayer capability. The updated mechanics contain a 16:9 widescreen support, new items, new jobs, and cel-shaded full motion videos. The English version contains full voice acting during the cinematic cut scenes, whereas the Japanese version does not.

=== The Ivalice Chronicles ===
An expanded remaster, subtitled The Ivalice Chronicles, was released on September 30, 2025, for PlayStation 4, PlayStation 5, Nintendo Switch, Nintendo Switch 2, Xbox Series X/S, and Windows. Developed by Square Enix, the remaster includes an updated script and story, gameplay additions including an easier difficulty and options to increase field visibility, updated graphics, and full voice acting in English and Japanese. The original game is included with the localization used in The War of the Lions. Multiple original staff returned including Kazutoyo Maehiro as director, Matsuno as writer and script editor, and Minagawa as art director. Yoshida returned to draw new cover art featuring Ramza and Delita.

Production of The Ivalice Chronicles was spurred on by Maehiro, who had played the original and wanted it both to be accessible on modern platforms, and easier for players to understand and complete. Maehiro chose the PlayStation version as the remaster's starting point over The War of the Lions, due to both a lack of direct experience among the team and a wish to highlight the original. Speaking after the announcement, Matsuno felt he was presenting the game to a modern audience who were facing similar social and economic issues to those that initially inspired the game's tone. Development was complicated due to the original master data source code not being preserved, with the team reconstructing the code using multiple commercial versions and experience from repeated playthroughs. Maehiro compared the process to porting an arcade game to an early home console. Full voice acting was included as a modern concession, with the dialogue being rewritten to flow more naturally while preserving the original tone. For the PlayStation original included in The Ivalice Chronicles, the team added an autosave function along with fixing various bugs. The graphics were also improved with a focus on presenting them in their best light rather than changing anything. Due to the choice to focus on the original, added content from The War of the Lions was not included.

== Reception ==
Reception

Aggregate scores
Aggregator	Score
Metacritic	83/100
OpenCritic	92% recommend (The Ivalice Chronicles) (Note: Based on 120 reviews)

Review scores
Publication	Score
Edge	9/10
Electronic Gaming Monthly	9.5/10, 9/10, 8.5/10, 8.5/10
Famitsu	9/10, 9/10, 8/10, 8/10
GameFan	267/300
GamePro	4.5/5
GameSpot	8.9/10
IGN	8.5/10
Jeuxvideo.com	19/20
Next Generation	4/5
RPGamer	10/10
RPGFan	84% (PS1); 86% (PSN)
Chicago Tribune	4/4
PSX Extreme	9/10

Final Fantasy Tactics sold nearly 825,000 copies in Japan in the first half of 1997, and ended the year at almost 1.24 million copies sold. By 2007 the game had sold approximately 1.35 million copies in Japan. As of August 2011, the original PlayStation version had sold over 2.4 million copies worldwide.

Final Fantasy Tactics received critical acclaim upon its release. Some reviews lauded the battle sequences as challenging, requiring more strategic planning than ordinary RPGs and utilising many gameplay mechanics in later battle sequences. The visuals were also lauded, particularly the spell effects, 3D battlegrounds, and camera that can be rotated and zoomed. Other reviewers disagreed and considered these elements a problem because it necessitated that the battles consist of fewer characters. John Ricciardi, in his review for Electronic Gaming Monthly, argued that the game should have been done in 2D style so that the PlayStation's processors could handle larger battlefields. Nob Ogasawara, when writing for GamePro, was also concerned with the small scale of the battles, saying that as a result the game "isn't so much Tactics Ogre with a Final Fantasy flavor as it is FF with a TO flavor". A reviewer at RPGFan criticized the game's difficulty as inconsistent, in part due to abilities unique to certain characters which unfairly sway the tide of battle either in favor of or against the player.

Critics praised the story's depth and plot twists but some remarked that the large number of similar-looking characters made it hard to distinguish between characters to develop an emotional attachment. RPGFan criticized the English localization as rife with grammatical mistakes. The game's soundtrack was also praised.

IGN awarded the game the Editor's Choice Award in 1998, praising the in-game graphics as "amazing" and the battle environments with its extra details as being "extremely well designed". GameSpot named Final Fantasy Tactics as one of "the greatest games of all time" in 2007. The game placed 84th in the "Top 100 Favorite Games of All Time" poll by Japanese magazine Famitsu in March 2006, 45th in Game Informer's list of top 100 games, 43rd in Electronic Gaming Monthly's list, and 38th in IGN's rankings of greatest games. The Ivalice Chronicles re-release was awarded Best Sim/Strategy Game at The Game Awards 2025.

== Legacy ==
The world of Final Fantasy Tactics has been featured in several other Square video games. After the game's release, the development staff developed Vagrant Story, which featured several subtle references to Final Fantasy Tactics. In an interview, Matsuno said both titles are set in the same fictional world of Ivalice.

During the development of Vagrant Story, Matsuno and Sakaguchi initiated a sequel to Tactics, which would have used 2D graphics due to issues with 3D development at the time. The project was outsourced to an unspecified developer because of the team's commitment to Vagrant Story and was later cancelled for unspecified reasons.

In 2006, Final Fantasy XII was released, also set in the world of Ivalice. Square Enix announced at the end of the same year the Ivalice Alliance, a new series of games set in the world of Ivalice, during a Tokyo press conference. The first title released was Final Fantasy XII: Revenant Wings. Square released Final Fantasy Tactics Advance for the Nintendo Game Boy Advance in 2003. The game setting and engine are similar to the ones of its predecessor, but the cast of characters is considerably smaller and the plot is simpler. An indirect sequel to Final Fantasy Tactics Advance, titled Final Fantasy Tactics A2: Grimoire of the Rift, was released in Japan in 2007 and in the rest of the world in 2008. It is also one of the titles released under the Ivalice Alliance game series, and takes place in the Ivalice universe.

Ramza and Agrias appeared in online trading card game Lord of Vermilion III in 2014. Ramza also appears as a playable character in the fighting game Dissidia Final Fantasy NT. In 2017, the MMORPG Final Fantasy XIV: A Realm Reborn portrayed an alternate version of Final Fantasy Tactics in which Ramza and his companions died at the end of Tactics. Matsuno said that the inspiration to depict this plot came from the number of players that misunderstood the ending of Tactics. Final Fantasy Tactics is featured in the Final Fantasy Trading Card Game, with Ramza, Delita, Agrias, and other characters appearing in Opus I (Roman Numeral). Tactics has made additional appearances in Opus III, IV, V, VII, X, and XIII.

A remixed version of the song "Ovelia & Delita" was nominated for "Best Game Music Cover/Remix" at the 16th Annual Game Audio Network Guild Awards.

An upcoming game, Unsung Story, is meant to be a spiritual successor to Final Fantasy Tactics. It has design input from Yasumi Matsuno and a soundtrack composed by Hitoshi Sakimoto.
