= Ivalice =

Fictional universe setting

- Final Fantasy location
- Ivalice concept artwork for Fortress created by Tony Holmsten.
- First appearance: Final Fantasy Tactics (1997)
- Created by: Yasumi Matsuno
- Genre: Role-playing, real-time strategy

In-universe information
- Type: Kingdom, region
- Locations: Dalmasca, Leá Monde

Ivalice (イヴァリース, Ivarīsu) is a fictional world and setting primarily appearing in the Final Fantasy video game series developed and published by Square Enix (formerly Square). Originally created by designer Yasumi Matsuno for Final Fantasy Tactics (1997), Ivalice is a high fantasy world with a focus on political drama and the stories of everyday people caught up in events. The setting has been used in multiple Tactics sequels, and the mainline entry Final Fantasy XII (2006). As of 2025, Square Enix has no plans to set a new game within Ivalice.

Matsuno created the world of Ivalice as place with rich and detailed history, and expanded it through multiple titles until he left Square Enix in 2005. The setting saw continued use through a collection dubbed the Ivalice Alliance. Due to its incorporation in Final Fantasy XII, it has been described by developers as becoming more Square Enix's setting than Matsuno's. The setting has been an influence on future Final Fantasy titles, and seen limited commentary on its themes and design compared to other entries within the franchise.

== Setting overview ==
Ivalice is a world within the Final Fantasy series, first introduced in Final Fantasy Tactics (1997). Alternately referred to as a kingdom or wider region, Ivalice is principally portrayed as a medieval high fantasy setting inspired by Arthurian legend, although science fiction elements were incorporated. The locations of Ivalice have drawn from multiple influences; the landscapes of Final Fantasy XII (2006) were based on real-world locations around the Mediterranean Sea, while the Vagrant Story (2000) location of Leá Monde was directly based on the town of Saint-Émilion. The cancelled title Fortress was to have used a "Nordic" artstyle and featured a variety of regions including plains, forests and snowfields. Recurring Final Fantasy elements also appear across the Ivalice world including Chocobos and Moogles.

Stories set within the world of Ivalice are often associated with a realistic tone, dealing with politics and the lives of everyday people. It was stated in 2004 that titles using the setting took place geographically close to each other while being separated by spans of time. While titles such as Final Fantasy XII were characterized by a mature tone, later entries related to Tactics were designed to have a light-hearted atmosphere. Several later titles explicitly referenced other Ivalice games through in-world references (the Kiltia religion, Judges) and character cameos. Recurring figures are the Espers or Lucavi, summoned monsters who can be called as allies in Final Fantasy XII and are antagonists in the story of Tactics. A recurring character in several titles is Montblanc, a Moogle clan leader.

In the world's fictional chronology, Final Fantasy XII is the earliest entry, taking place in a time of advanced magic and technology where Humes (humans) shared the world with other species. These included Moogles, and Ivalice-specific species including the rabbit-like Viera and Nou Mu, the reptilian Bangaa, and the pig-like Seeq. Three titles are stated to directly follow Final Fantasy XII. They are the direct sequel Final Fantasy XII: Revenant Wings (2007) which features a light-hearted adventure with the same cast, the spin-off Final Fantasy Tactics A2: Grimoire of the Rift (2007) which has characters appearing as allies, and Fortress which followed the cast of XII facing a new threat.

Following the era of Final Fantasy XII, an unspecified catastrophe strikes Ivalice, wiping out almost all of the non-Hume species and knocking back technology to a pre-industrial level. Final Fantasy Tactics is set within a kingdom called Ivalice, which is in the midst of a war. While Vagrant Story is considered part of the Ivalice setting and placed in some future time after Tactics, it was later revealed that references to the Ivalice setting within the game were originally intended as fan service. The mobile titles Crystal Defenders and Tactics S uses the Tactics A2 version of Ivalice as a backdrop for their gameplay and art design. An alternate Ivalice, an imaginary world born from emotions, was the main setting of Final Fantasy Tactics Advance (2003). A different version of Ivalice is featured in a crossover with Final Fantasy XIV (2013) in a campaign dubbed "Return to Ivalice"; the storyline included characters based on those from XII and Tactics.

== Creation and history ==
The world of Ivalice was created by Yasumi Matsuno, a video game designer and writer known for his work on the Ogre Battle series for Quest Corporation; he created the setting for Final Fantasy Tactics, developed and published by Square (later Square Enix). Ivalice was originally designed and described by Matsuno as a complex setting with a deep historical background. Motomu Toriyama, who worked on a later Ivalice project, felt that following the creation of Final Fantasy XII the setting had become more Square Enix's world than Matsuno's.

Following Matsuno's departure from Square Enix in 2005, more games would be set in the world of Ivalice. A collection of games using the setting began release in 2006 under the banner title the Ivalice Alliance, taking place across the land's history. The goal was to attract new players to the series and setting, with the project's games not all falling within the RPG genre. Akitoshi Kawazu, executive producer for the Ivalice Alliance titles, cited Ivalice as a compelling setting within the Final Fantasy series for its grounded design.

Reflecting on the later incorporation of Ivalice into Final Fantasy XIV, Matsuno summed up the world as a "blank canvas" on which he and others could create narratives. While Final Fantasy XIV producer Naoki Yoshida voiced his wish in 2024 to preserve and re-release early Ivalice titles, in a different 2025 interview staff member Kazutoyo Maehiro, who was directing a remaster of Tactics, stated that Square Enix was not planning a new entry in the Ivalice setting. While he was glad to be working with the Ivalice setting again, he described the Tactics remaster as a very personal project rather than indicative of company plans.

== Reception ==
Matsuno's work within the Ivalice setting was a direct inspiration for the design of Final Fantasy XIV; the scenario drew direct inspiration, and the setting was referenced through several location names like Dalmasca. Yoshida also incorporated the Viera people into XIV as a player character option. In an interview, Maehiro cited his experience with the Ivalice titles as having an influence on his scenario writing for both Final Fantasy XIV and Final Fantasy XVI (2023).

In a 2007 retrospective on the Final Fantasy series, GameTrailers said that Ivalice "stands as the most expansive setting ever created in the Final Fantasy universe". In his 2014 book Science Fiction Video Games, Neal Roger Tringham summed up the Ivalice setting as "a pseudo-Medieval world that includes elements of Arabian fantasy", highlighting the different narrative mood of Final Fantasy XII compared to other mainline titles. In the book Interactive Storytelling in Video Games as part of an essay on Final Fantasy Tactics, Josiah Lebowitz and Chris Klug highlighted Ivalice as a popular setting within the Final Fantasy series, attributing that to its story approach of deep backstories the players could uncover.

Individual titles have seen limited commentary on the setting. In a 1998 editorial on Tactics for RPGamer, Jeff Adashek felt that the game's handling of the Church of Glabados was poor, with its story content of a religious institution worshiping what is functionally a demon as potentially offensive or insulting. The Ivalice of Final Fantasy XII is considered a Japanese take on the Star Wars galaxy by GameSpot reviewer Greg Kasavin, citing both its story of resistance against an imperial occupier, and mixture of different peoples. Edge Magazine felt that the story of Final Fantasy XII served best as a backdrop to the environments and peoples of Ivalice, which were considered the game's highlight. Eurogamer's Luke Albiges highlighted the "beautiful architecture and interaction of the various races" in Final Fantasy XII, noting the melancholy atmosphere created by traversing the different areas on foot.

== See also ==
- Spira (Final Fantasy)
