= Recurring elements in the Final Fantasy series =

The logo of the Final Fantasy series

Final Fantasy is a media franchise created by Hironobu Sakaguchi, and developed and owned by Square Enix (formerly Square). The franchise centers on a series of fantasy and science fantasy role-playing video games (RPGs). The eponymous first game in the series, published in 1987, was conceived by Sakaguchi as his last-ditch effort in the game industry; the game was a success and spawned sequels. While most entries in the series are separate from each other, they have recurring elements carrying over between entries, including plot themes and motifs, gameplay mechanics, and visual elements.

The Final Fantasy series features recurring thematic elements, including magical crystals and creatures such as the Chocobo and Moogle which have appeared in multiple roles. Numerous writers have worked on the series, including Sakaguchi himself, early writer Kenji Terada, Kazushige Nojima, and Yasumi Matsuno. Some settings and specific themes have been used in multiple installments and subseries, including the fictional world of Ivalice, Compilation of Final Fantasy VII, and the Fabula Nova Crystallis mythos. The art design for the series has been associated with multiple artists, the three most prominent being Yoshitaka Amano, Tetsuya Nomura, and Akihiko Yoshida. Amano designed characters up to Final Fantasy VI and continues to design each game's logo, Nomura has designed characters for multiple games since Final Fantasy VII, and Yoshida has been involved in XII, XIV, and games associated with Ivalice.

The original gameplay created by Akitoshi Kawazu was based around Dungeons & Dragons and Wizardry. Starting with Final Fantasy IV, the Hiroyuki Ito-designed ATB system took prevalence; variations of the ATB system have been used in multiple entries since then. These various elements have been positively received by critics over the series' lifetime, contributing to its overall worldwide success, with the gameplay and narratives frequently cited as setting a standard for RPGs. The series also produced spin-off entries including SaGa and Mana, and in turn influenced later game developers and studios.

== Overview ==
The Final Fantasy media franchise began with the development of the titular first game in the series. It was developed at Square, later dubbed Square Enix after its 2003 merger with Enix. Final Fantasy was creator Hironobu Sakaguchi's last-ditch attempt at success within the video game market; Sakaguchi had long wished to create a role-playing game, but the company had denied him the opportunity until then. The first Final Fantasy was released in 1987, and was a commercial and critical success that fueled the development of further games. The series garnered international popularity with the release of Final Fantasy VII (1997) for the PlayStation, which became the highest-selling Final Fantasy game to date. Final Fantasy has become one of Square Enix's major gaming franchises; as of 2016, the series has sold 110 million copies worldwide across 48 video game releases.

== Scenarios ==
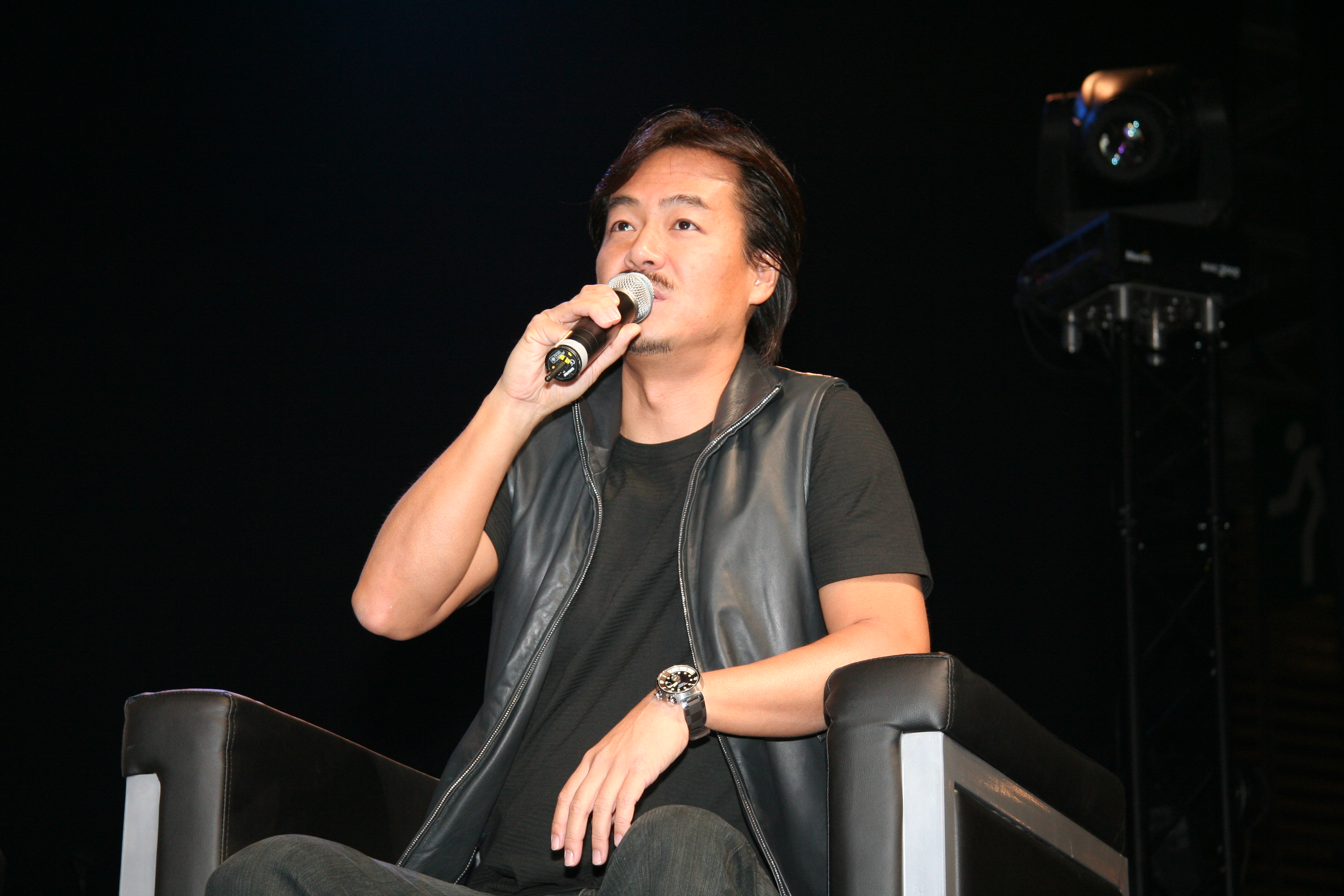
Series creator Hironobu Sakaguchi in 2007, who worked on multiple game scenarios

Final Fantasy series consists of multiple games that, while generally having separate settings and narratives, share common themes and motifs in their worlds and plots. Multiple writers have worked on the Final Fantasy series over its existence, the most prominent having worked on the mainline games. The first Final Fantasy writer was Kenji Terada, who was asked on board the project by staff who were fans of his work in anime. He was asked to create a scenario that would make players cry. Terada would provide the scenarios for Final Fantasy II (1988) and III (1990). He later had mixed feelings about the impact of Final Fantasy on his career, as many only knew him from his video game writing. When Final Fantasy IV (1991) was pushed forward onto the next generation of game hardware, Terada's planned scenario was scrapped by the management and he parted with Square on poor terms.

After Terada's departure, scenario work was delegated to Takashi Tokita. Tokita wrote the scenario for Final Fantasy IV (1991), along with being the game's designer. For Final Fantasy V (1992), the scenario was a collaboration between Sakaguchi and Yoshinori Kitase. Final Fantasy VI (1994) was worked on by a group of four or five different writers, including Kitase. Sakaguchi was responsible for providing the basic story from the original game until Final Fantasy VI. Sakaguchi would also write the scenario draft for Final Fantasy IX (2000), with further contributions Kazuhiko Aoki and Nobuaki Komoto.

One of the notable recurring writers is Kazushige Nojima: he first joined the development team for Final Fantasy VII, and would later write the scenario for Final Fantasy VIII (1999). He was also a major contributor to Final Fantasy X (2001) alongside other writers. He returned to write the scenario for Final Fantasy X-2 (2003), despite initial reluctance due to its upbeat feel when compared to its predecessor. His later supplementary material would return to a darker theme. Nojima also created the original scenario of Final Fantasy XV (2016), then called Final Fantasy Versus XIII. His original scenario was reworked for XV by Saori Itamuro. Another recurring writer is Daisuke Watanabe. His first job on the series was with Final Fantasy X. He worked on Final Fantasy XII (2005) as a scenario writer after original writer Yasumi Matsuno left due to illness. The initial script was written by Miwa Shoda, whose work was fleshed out by Watanabe. Watanabe would later work on the scenarios of Final Fantasy XIII (2009) and its sequels, which would become one of his major projects.

The scenario for Final Fantasy XI (2002) was created by Masato Kato, who returned for the expansion Rise of the Zilart. For Final Fantasy XIV (2010), the writer was Yaeko Sato, who also worked on XI and XII; Sato stayed on as lead writer for Final Fantasy XIV: A Realm Reborn (2013), alongside new writer Kazutoyo Maehiro. The lead writer for expansions beginning with Heavensward is Banri Oda. The scenario of Final Fantasy XVI is written by Maehiro.

The first game to receive a direct sequel was Final Fantasy X; X-2 is set in the same fictional world of Spira while using a lighter tone than its predecessor. No sequel to Final Fantasy X was planned initially. Final Fantasy XIII was also intended to be a standalone game, and was later expanded into the series' first official trilogy with the development of XIII-2 (2011) and Lightning Returns (2013). Final Fantasy XV was expanded into a multimedia series to avoid creating a video game series; named the Final Fantasy XV Universe, it is split between pre-release media including a feature film and original net animation, and post-release content including other spin-off games and downloadable content.

Final Fantasy VII was later expanded into a multimedia series named Compilation of Final Fantasy VII, which included video games (Before Crisis, Dirge of Cerberus, Crisis Core) and film projects (Advent Children, Last Order). A different subseries linked by common elements, and indirectly inspired by the Compilation, is Fabula Nova Crystallis Final Fantasy; while the subseries' games have unique settings and stories, they all share a common mythos surrounding crystals and their associated deities. Fabula Nova Crystallis was originally planned as a platform for the development of multiple games planned out in advance, compared to Final Fantasy producer Shinji Hashimoto to the Star Wars and The Lord of the Rings film franchises. Eventually mixed reactions to the subseries prompted Square Enix to move away from the esoteric and complex storylines it incorporated.

A world later incorporated into the Final Fantasy series is Ivalice, the setting for games within the game collection known as the Ivalice Alliance. Taking place within a single world across a large time period, Ivalice is the setting for Final Fantasy Tactics (1997), Final Fantasy XII, and Vagrant Story (2000). Vagrant Story did not originally take place in Ivalice, being incorporated into the subseries by Square Enix long after its release. The game's references to other Final Fantasy games were originally intended as fan service. Ivalice itself was the creation of Yasumi Matsuno, the main creative force behind Tactics and Vagrant Story. It first appeared in Tactics. Matsuno's work with Ivalice later inspired the scenarios for A Realm Reborn.

=== Common elements ===
==== Story themes ====
Stories in the series frequently emphasize the internal struggles, passions, and tragedies of the characters, and the main plot often recedes into the background as the focus shifts to their personal lives. Other aspects explored are the relationships between characters, which range from love to rivalry. Other recurring situations that drive the plot include amnesia, a hero corrupted by an evil force, mistaken identity, and self-sacrifice. Esoteric and mystical elements also take a central role in several games, though later games such as Final Fantasy XV focus on simple narratives and understandable knowledge for its lore. The central conflict in many Final Fantasy games focuses on a group of characters battling an evil, and sometimes ancient, antagonist that dominates the game's world. Stories frequently involve a sovereign state in rebellion, with the protagonists taking part in the rebellion. The heroes are often destined to defeat the evil, and occasionally gather as a direct result of the antagonist's malicious actions. Twin antagonists, with the second main antagonist being hidden for the majority of the game, is also a recurring element. Other common plot and setting themes include the Gaia hypothesis, an apocalypse, and conflicts between advanced technology and nature. Most games feature names inspired from various cultures' history, languages, and mythology, including Asian, European, and Middle-Eastern. In-game items such as weapons follow this tradition: the two most notable are Excalibur and Masamune, derived respectively from the Arthurian sword and legendary Japanese swordsmith.

==== Crystals ====
A recurring concept within Final Fantasy settings is the use of important magical crystals; in early games, they represented the Japanese classical elements and were instrumental in keeping the world in balance. Due to this, control over the crystals forms part of a chosen games' core narrative. The concept of crystals was introduced into the original game by game designer Koichi Ishii. Based on positive fan feedback, Terada suggested carrying them into future entries. Since then, crystals have taken prominent roles in Final Fantasy III, IV, V, VI, VII, and IX. They took minimal roles in II, VIII, X, and XII. Crystals also took a central role in Final Fantasy XIII and XV, which both used the crystal-based Fabula Nova Crystallis lore. In contrast, overt references such as terminology and branding were removed from XV to help with marketing. Crystals were included in A Realm Reborn as a central plot due to being given "short shrift in recent games". For Final Fantasy XVI, crystals were included as the equivalent to limited fuel sources, with their fading power triggering the plot's events.

==== Magitek ====
In games with universes containing more advanced technology, it is often depicted as predominantly powered by magic. This is specifically called magitek in Final Fantasy VI, XIV, and XV, while other games have similar elements under a different name, such as mako technology in VII and magicite technology in XII. Such magical technology is often used as a metaphor for overreaching, evil ambition, breaking the rules of the world, and stealing its energy no matter the cost. Extremely powerful magitek armor is recurring in various games in the series, such as in VI, XIV, and XV in the form of mecha, and in XV as powered armor.

==== Characters and monsters ====
Characters and monsters have made appearances in multiple Final Fantasy games, although they remain unconnected in a narrative sense. A recurring animal in Final Fantasy is the Chocobo, a galliform bird that regularly acts as a means of transport for characters. The Chocobo was created by Ishii for Final Fantasy II, and have appeared in every mainline Final Fantasy game since then. A second recurring race are the Moogles, whose Japanese name is Mōguri, a portmanteau of the words mogura (mole) and kōmori (bat); while frequently seen running shops or assuming some other background role, they have also appeared as party allies or playable characters. The Moogles were also created by Ishii, originally designed in his school days by combining a koala with a bat. Other recurring races include common monsters such as the cactus-like Cactuar, the Tonberry, the Malboro, the Behemoth, and the Iron Giant.

A human character that has frequently appeared is Cid (シド, Shido). Making his debut in Final Fantasy II, he has appeared in multiple forms as everything from a player character to an antagonist. His most frequent occupation is an engineer, and he is commonly associated with the party's airship. Cid was originally created as a character that would appear in multiple forms: his one common attribute was that he was an intelligent and wise figure "like Yoda from the Star Wars series". Two other recurring human characters are Biggs and Wedge, a duo named after Biggs Darklighter and Wedge Antilles from the Star Wars franchise who are often used for comic relief. Making their debut in Final Fantasy VI as footsoldiers, they have since appeared in multiple Final Fantasy games. Another character is Gilgamesh; first appearing in Final Fantasy V, he has made cameo appearances in multiple Final Fantasy games since then. Unlike other recurring characters, most of Gilgamesh's appearances are the same individual who travels between dimensions. Gilgamesh, named after the mythological figure, was created by Sakaguchi, and designed by Tetsuya Nomura and Yoshitaka Amano.

==== Items ====
Certain items carry across numerous games in the series, one of the most well-known of which is the Phoenix Down, abbreviated "Fenix Down" in earlier titles, which revives a party member from incapacitation in or outside of battle. The Phoenix Down first appeared in Final Fantasy II, and did not appear in the original until its Game Boy Advance remake. They reference the ability of the phoenix – which later became a regular Final Fantasy summon – to revive itself upon death. They also double as weapons against undead enemies in some games, able to damage them or kill them instantly. In games featuring a single player character, the Phoenix Down automatically revives the player for a certain duration. Besides Final Fantasy, Phoenix Downs are also an item in the Square Enix role-playing game Bravely Default.

A notorious instance of ludonarrative dissonance noted by fans is why a Phoenix Down was not used to revive Aerith in Final Fantasy VII. One offered explanation is that characters are only ever knocked unconscious in battle, and items do not work on someone with a grievous enough wound.

== Gameplay ==
Since the series' inception, gameplay in the majority of mainline Final Fantasy games has followed certain conventions of the role-playing genre. Players take control of a party of characters, commanding anywhere between three and eight during battles. Players must face a variety of enemies who continually try to damage the player; in battle, the characters can select a variety of commands from a menu, such as "Fight", "Magic", "Item", as well as other special skills such as "Steal", "Throw", or "Summon". The battle is won when all enemies are defeated. Up until Final Fantasy XI, battles were triggered through random encounters: starting with XI and continuing in following games, enemies were visible in the field and could be avoided. Like other role-playing games, Final Fantasy most commonly uses an experience point-based leveling system, where each battle awards experience points and gaining levels increases character statistics such as health and magic.

Magic is another common role-playing element in the series. The method by which characters gain magic varies between installments, but is generally divided into classes organized by color: "White magic", which focuses on spells that assist teammates; "Black magic", which focuses on harming enemies; "Red magic", which is a combination of white and black magic, "Blue magic", which mimics enemy attacks; and "Green magic" which focuses on applying status effects to either allies or enemies.

Different means of transportation have appeared through the series. The most common is the airship for long range travel, accompanied by chocobos for traveling short distances, but others include sea and land vessels. Following Final Fantasy VII, more modern and futuristic vehicle designs have been included. For Final Fantasy XV, a car dubbed "Regalia" was introduced as both a ground-based transport and later as a vehicle that could be converted to function as an airship. Airships are often unlocked for players fairly late in the game.

=== Battle systems ===
The battle system of the original Final Fantasy was designed by Akitoshi Kawazu. When creating it, he closely followed the mechanics created in the Western tabletop game Dungeons & Dragons, particularly the incorporation of enemy-specific weaknesses that were otherwise missing from Japanese games at the time. He also added elements such as weapon and item abilities based on their successful implementation in Wizardry. This first version of the battle system was a traditional turn-based system with characters appearing on the left-hand side of the screen, a feature later adopted by multiple other role-playing games (RPGs). For Final Fantasy II, Kawazu designed the battle system based around a more focused approach to story, along with accommodating for character classes being locked to specific characters. In Final Fantasy II, character abilities improved based on the number of times they were used and the number of hit points accumulated during battles: if a character used magic, they would become strong in magic while other attributes would suffer. For Final Fantasy III, the system changed back to a traditional class-based model: Kawazu said that the reason for this was because no-one could fully understand the system he had created for Final Fantasy II.

The battle system most closely associated with Final Fantasy is the "Active Time Battle" (ATB) system: while utilizing a turn-based combat system, action meters are assigned to all characters that empty when they act in battle. Each player character being issued a command when their action meter is filled: enemies could attack at any time despite player actions being in progress, adding an element of urgency to battles. The ATB system was designed by Hiroyuki Ito. According to Kawazu, Ito was inspired while watching a Formula One race and seeing racers pass each other at different speeds. This gave him the idea of different speed values for the individual characters. Ito himself described the inspiration as his wish to balance pure turn-based mechanics with real-time battle mechanics, which played into a movement in Formula One where cars were shifting towards using semi-automatic gearboxes. For Final Fantasy V, Ito evolved the system further as he felt the version in IV was incomplete. A mechanic introduced in Final Fantasy VII was Limit Breaks, special cinematic moves that have become a staple of the series. The ATB system was in use until Final Fantasy X, which switched to a system called the "Conditional Turn-based Battle" system: while reverting to a purely turn-based model, it included additional elements such as in-battle party member switching. Final Fantasy XI, XIV, and its sequel A Realm Reborn used real-time command-based combat systems and removed random encounters, playing in a similar fashion to other contemporary MMORPGs. Final Fantasy XII used a similar real-time command-based system to XI: dubbed the "Active Dimension Battle" system, characters fought enemies in environments without random encounters, with players acting on commands set by the player.

The battle system for Final Fantasy XIII was designed to retain the strategic elements of earlier games while emulating the cinematic action of Final Fantasy VII: Advent Children. While retaining the ATB system, elements such as magic points were removed, and a strategic role-change system dubbed the Paradigm System was implemented, with the roles being based on Final Fantasy jobs. Final Fantasy XIII-2 continued using the Paradigm system with added gameplay functions based on criticism of the first game, while Lightning Returns changed to a more action-based, single-character version that incorporated design elements cut from XIII. Final Fantasy XV used an action-based system that was described as a "realistic" version of those used in the Kingdom Hearts series and spin-off game Final Fantasy Type-0. Unlike mainline Final Fantasy games up to this point, the players could only control one character out of the four-strong party. While the team experimented with multiple character control, it was decided that it presented too many development difficulties. The battle system of Final Fantasy XVI, designed by Capcom veteran Ryota Suzuki, again focused on action with a single protagonist with a focus on switching elemental abilities gained from the world's summons. Battles were also split between standard combat with smaller enemies, and large cinematic battles with their own mechanics.

=== Classes ===
Character classes in Final Fantasy are often referred to as "jobs"; they have been present in the series since the first game, where players chose each character's job from the outset. Kawazu created this system to give players freedom to customize the party. For Final Fantasy IV, jobs were attached to specific characters. Each job in a Final Fantasy game has unique abilities which develop as the player's level increases. In some games, the player can assign a character a specific job at the start of the game, while other games allow characters to combine and learn abilities from a number of jobs. In addition to other abilities, a character's job usually determines the types of weapons and armor that they can use.

Final Fantasy III saw the introduction of the Job Change System: through special crystals, the four player characters were granted a variety of jobs that could be switched at any point by the player. The Job Change system was initially proposed by Sakaguchi as he wanted to give players freedom to customize the party members. The Job System has continued to have a strong role in the series, being most prominent in Final Fantasy V with 22 available jobs. Jobs have recurring functions throughout the series. Some of the more traditional classes include the Warrior/Fighter, the Dragoon, the Thief, and variations on magical classes such as White and Black Mages. More original classes have appeared throughout the series, such as Bards, Scholars, and Summoners. Due to the series' popularity, they have become staples of RPGs since their debut. The complexity and scope of the job system, as well as whether or not characters are capable of changing jobs, varies from game to game. The original Final Fantasy XIV did away with the Job System in favour of a character class-driven system where equipment determined skills and growth. For the later stages of XIV and later A Realm Reborn, the Job System was reintroduced as a second level to the class system. Many Jobs, such as the Dragoon, the Summoner, the White Mage, the Black Mage, and the Red Mage have become closely identified with the series.

=== Summoning ===
A different system is "Summoning", a mechanic where characters can evoke summoned monsters (summoned beasts (召喚獣, Shoukanjuu) in Japanese) to aid the party through cinematic actions. The concept of summoning was proposed for the first Final Fantasy but was not implemented until Final Fantasy III. Summons can be either optional acquisitions or tied to story events and particular characters. The names of summons derive from multiple cultures, including Egyptian, Middle-Eastern, Asian, and Classical mythology. As groups within the games, they have been referred to by several names (Espers, Guardian Forces, Aeons, Eidolons, Astrals, Primals, Eikons), and have taken either core roles in the story or less prominent roles as tools for the player characters.

== Art design ==
The artwork of Final Fantasy was defined by two artists: Yoshitaka Amano (left) and Tetsuya Nomura (right).

The artwork and character designs of the first Final Fantasy were created by Yoshitaka Amano, a noted artist who had worked with Tatsunoko Production on multiple anime series including Science Ninja Team Gatchaman, and also did illustrations for Vampire Hunter D. Amano was brought on board the first Final Fantasy as general artwork designer, filling that role for II and III. For Final Fantasy IV, Amano was given more freedom to create elaborate character designs. Amano returned as character designer and general artwork for Final Fantasy V. Final Fantasy VI, in addition to featuring work by Amano, also had contributions from other designers including Kaori Tanaka. From the first Final Fantasy to IV, Amano created his artwork based on specific descriptions from game staff, while for Final Fantasy V and VI it was the game staff that took and adjusted his artwork to suit the games. He returned as a character designer for Final Fantasy IX, working from specifications provided by the game's staff. For Final Fantasy XI, Amano created the game's world map. One of the designs he recalled was for the summon Bahamut: while the original Bahamut was an aquatic monster, he did not know this at the time, so he designed Bahamut as a "mecha dragon". As of Final Fantasy XV, Amano's artwork has been created fairly early in a game's development based on the basic themes.

Amano's most enduring contribution to the series is his logo designs: receiving design documents as primarily text-based requests and descriptions, he treats each logo as a piece of full artwork rather than a simple logo. Since Final Fantasy IV, the current font style was adopted, along with a specially designed logo by Amano. The emblem relates to a game's respective plot and typically portrays a character or object in the story. Subsequent remakes of the first three games have replaced the previous logos with ones similar to the rest of the series. His work on Final Fantasy brought him international fame.

From Final Fantasy VII onward, the main character designer for the series was Tetsuya Nomura, whose first major contribution had been character and monster designs for Final Fantasy VI. He was chosen by Sakaguchi as the character designer for VII after being amused by his storyboards for VI. His greater involvement was also due to scheduling conflicts with Amano's overseas trips to open exhibitions in Europe and North America. Nomura would end up having a substantial input into the character stories. While Final Fantasy VII would become Nomura's favorite project, its graphical limitations meant that his art style was limited in turn. For Final Fantasy VIII, he worked with other artists to make the characters more realistic. Nomura returned for Final Fantasy X, designing the main cast and creating a setting influenced by the South Pacific, Thailand, and Japan. For Final Fantasy XV, Nomura created the main characters alongside being one of the main creative forces behind its development. A trend with Nomura's characters is their names being related to the weather or the sky (Cloud, Squall, Tidus, Lightning). He wanted to break this tradition when designing Noctis Lucis Caelum, but after Final Fantasy XIII's Lightning was given a weather-based name, Nomura gave Noctis his current name: Noctis' name translates from Latin to "Night of Light Sky".

Other notable artists include Akihiko Yoshida, Isamu Kamikokuryo, and Yusuke Naora. Yoshida's first major games were Final Fantasy Tactics and Vagrant Story, which he worked on together with Hiroshi Minagawa. He also did design work for Final Fantasy Tactics Advance, creating the Bangaa race that would later appear in Final Fantasy XII. For XII, he designed the main characters. As inspiration for their physical appearances, Yoshida used a variety of influences from multiple cultures. He returned to work on Final Fantasy XIV, where he needed to adjust from working on a static project to designing for the more fluid environment of an MMORPG. He would also contribute designs to A Realm Reborn, and its first expansion Heavensward. Kamikokuryo first did work on Final Fantasy VIII and X, then became art director for XII. He would return to this role for Final Fantasy XII: Revenant Wings, and the Final Fantasy XIII games: he had a major role in the design of Lightning's new appearance in XIII-2. He was also involved in the world design of Final Fantasy XV. Naora had a presence within the series since Final Fantasy VII, for which he designed the kanji logo for the antagonistic Shinra Corporation. His involvement in the series has primarily been as an art director for games such as Final Fantasy X and XV, in addition to creating character designs for Final Fantasy XIII-2 and Final Fantasy Type-0.

Other artists have also contributed to the series. Hideo Minaba contributed character designs to Final Fantasy IX, worked as an art director for XII, and would later design characters for XIII-2. Italian-born artist Roberto Ferrari worked as a secondary character designer for Final Fantasy Type-0, Final Fantasy XV, and Final Fantasy VII Remake. Yusaku Nakaaki worked with Naora and Nomura to create characters for Final Fantasy Type-0, and along with Ferrari created secondary characters for Final Fantasy XV. Akira Oguro created the character artwork for the mobile games Final Fantasy IV: The After Years and Final Fantasy Dimensions. Toshitaka Matsuda's first major work was on Final Fantasy XII: Revenant Wings, and he would later serve as a costume and character designer for Lightning Returns: Final Fantasy XIII. Toshiyuki Itahana first worked on character designs for Final Fantasy IX, then later served as a main artist for the Crystal Chronicles spin-off series, Lightning Returns: Final Fantasy XIII, and the mobile game Mobius Final Fantasy. A key designer for much of the series' life was Kazuko Shibuya, who did sprite designs from Final Fantasy to VI. She also did work on Final Fantasy Dimensions. A notable outside collaborator was Hiromu Takahara, lead designer for Japanese fashion house Roen, who created the clothing for the main cast of Final Fantasy XV.

== Reception and influence ==
The Final Fantasy series and several specific games within it have been credited for introducing and popularizing many concepts that are today widely used in console RPGs. The side view perspective with groups of monsters against a group of characters used by the early Final Fantasy games has been frequently imitated, supplanting the prior RPG standard of one-on-one battles against monsters from a first-person perspective. The class changing systems and multiple types of magic available were also influential on the genre, as were the use of a variety of vehicles. By contrast, IGN has commented that the menu system used by the games is a major detractor for many and is a "significant reason why they haven't touched the series". Destructoid's Chris Hovermale cited the battle systems of the Final Fantasy series as an example of video games have evolved their combat systems over time.

Edge cited the visuals of the series as a reason for its long-standing critical praise. In 1996, Next Generation included the series on a ranking of the best games and series of all time, with one of its points of praise being the narratives. That magazine later cited the "melodramatic storylines" used in the series as a factor in its longevity. In a review of Final Fantasy VI from 2005, GameSpot cited that game as a genre-defining game with its storyline and emphasis on character development, while Final Fantasy VII has frequently been classed as a game that helped solidify the structure and style of RPGs for many years to follow. Digital Spy said in 2012 that Final Fantasy had "shaped and defined role-playing games across generations of consoles", though felt the series had lost some of its appeal as its more recent installments differed too much from their predecessors, with some fans referring to Final Fantasy X as "the last traditional game in the series".

Kawazu would develop the concepts he created for Final Fantasy II into its own series, titled SaGa, and other franchises including The Elder Scrolls would adopt its usage-based skill systems. Ishii's experience working on Final Fantasy was reflected in his design philosophies for the Mana series, which began life as a Final Fantasy spin-off. Numerous industry developers and studios (including Ubisoft's Maxime Beland, multiple BioWare staff, Peter Molyneux) have cited Final Fantasy as an influence on either their general game design or specific games. Several independent developers have drawn on both classic and contemporary Final Fantasy games when developing games, citing examples within their narratives, game design, and visuals.
