= Vagrant Story =

2000 video game

- North American cover art
- Developer: Square Product Development Division 4
- Publishers: WW: Square; NA: Square Electronic Arts
- Director: Yasumi Matsuno
- Producer: Yasumi Matsuno
- Designer: Yasumi Matsuno
- Programmer: Taku Murata
- Artists: Hiroshi Minagawa; Akihiko Yoshida
- Writers: Yasumi Matsuno; Jun Akiyama
- Composer: Hitoshi Sakimoto
- Series: Ivalice Alliance
- Platform: PlayStation
- Release: JP: February 10, 2000; NA: May 16, 2000; EU: June 21, 2000
- Genre: Action role-playing
- Mode: Single-player

Vagrant Story (Note: Japanese: ベイグラントストーリー, Hepburn: Beiguranto Sutōrī) is a 2000 action role-playing game developed and published by Square for the PlayStation. The game has been re-released by Square Enix through the PlayStation Network for the PlayStation 3, PlayStation Portable and PlayStation Vita consoles. Vagrant Story was primarily developed by the team responsible for Final Fantasy Tactics, with Yasumi Matsuno serving as director, producer, designer, and writer.

The game takes place in the world of Ivalice, in a kingdom called Valendia and the ruined city of Leá Monde. The story centers on Ashley Riot, an elite agent known as a Riskbreaker, who must travel to Leá Monde to investigate the link between a cult leader and a senior Valendian Parliament member, Duke Bardorba. In the prologue, Ashley is blamed for murdering the duke and the game discloses the events that happen one week before the murder.

Vagrant Story is unique as a console action role-playing game in that it features no shops and no player interaction with other characters; instead, the game focuses on weapon creation and modification, as well as elements of puzzle-solving and strategy. The game received critical acclaim from gaming publications, with some calling it one of the greatest games of all time.

== Gameplay ==
Vagrant Story is a solo action role-playing game, in which the player controls Ashley Riot from a third-person perspective while exploring Leá Monde and the catacombs underneath. The player may also switch into first-person perspective to allow for a 360° view using the START button or right analog stick on the game controller. Characters and sprites are proportionate with each other, and the player navigates Ashley on a three-dimensional field map. Navigation is in real-time, and areas accessed by the player are stored in an in-game map menu.

Ashley can run, jump, and push crates and cubes to navigate around obstacles, adding puzzle and platforming elements to gameplay. During the game, the player must sometimes solve block puzzles to advance the story. When the player returns to a completed block puzzle room, a time-attack mode called "Evolve, or Die!!" begins. Players must reach the end of the room in the shortest time possible, after which they are ranked. This stage is optional and can be turned off from the menu.

In the field map, players may engage the enemy as soon as they enter Battle Mode, which uses a pausable real-time combat system, much like Square's Parasite Eve (1998). In Battle Mode, when the player taps the attack button, a spherical grid appears around Ashley. Individual body parts within this sphere can be targeted. The battle system involves the player chaining different attacks known as Chain Abilities to achieve large combos and deal damage to the enemy. This is done by pressing buttons in timely succession, making combat resemble a rhythm game. In addition to Chain Abilities, Defensive Abilities allow Ashley to reduce or reflect damage or avoid status ailments. Ashley also gains Break Arts, which exchange his hit points (HP) for increased damage.

Ashley attacks a Crimson Blade soldier. The exclamation mark indicates the point where the player can chain attacks; reflexes must be keen to inflict higher damage to the enemy.

Magic in Vagrant Story is learned later in the game using Grimoires that are dropped by enemies. Once a Grimoire is used, the magic spell associated with the Grimoire will remain in the menu, and players only need to spend magic points (MP) to cast a learned spell. Magic spells can be used to attack, heal, create status effects, and manipulate Ashley's elemental and enemy affinities. Certain magic spells allow the player to affect multiple targets by using a small sphere positioned within the Battle Mode wire frame. Unlike physical attacks however, magic attacks cannot be chained.

Risk is an essential element in the battle system. A Risk bar is placed below the HP and MP bar, representing the Risk Points the player has accumulated. Risk Points affect Ashley's concentration; the longer Ashley attacks a target, the more his Risk Point accumulates, lowering his accuracy and defenses. Chain and Defensive Abilities increase Risk faster than regular attacks, while Break Arts do not increase Risk at all. Enemy attacks and spells deal more damage if the player has high Risk. The advantage, however, is the higher chances for the player to score critical hits and restore higher HP.

Vagrant Story's crafting system allows the player to create and customize weapons and armor in designated "workshop" areas, inputting various ranges, strengths, and statistics. Weapons fall into one of three main damage types: blunt, piercing, and edged. Equipment are influenced by their material and affinity to enemy classes and elements. Affinities influence the effectiveness of weapons and armor, but equipment might lose one form of affinity when it gains another type. Weapons and armor can be combined, merging their affinities and sometimes creating a new type of blade or armor in the process. Different weapon types have different ranges, such as a crossbow having a longer range than melee weapons such as a mace.

Like several Square titles, the New Game Plus option is made available to the player upon first completing the game. In Vagrant Story, selecting "New Game+" enables the player to replay the story using their end-game weapons, items, and statistics instead of the defaults. This option allows players to access a hidden level, which features more intimidating enemies and more powerful equipment. The story does not change, and original enemy statistics will remain at default.

== Plot ==
=== Setting ===
The Rood Inverse, a mystic symbol of the game

Vagrant Story is set in the fictitious city of Leá Monde, while the kingdom of Valendia is engulfed in civil war. Leá Monde is an old town with a history spanning more than two millennia. Located on an island surrounded by reefs, the walls have been the "witness of many battles" and are "stronger than the mightiest forts of Valendia". In its golden years, Leá Monde was a thriving community until an earthquake struck the town 25 years before the game, destroying the city and leaving the ground unstable.

The Grand Cathedral and the Temple of Kiltia are at the center of the city. This area is surrounded by the west and east districts, both in fairly good shape, as well as the massive, fortress-like City Walls. Beneath the ground are an abandoned mineshaft and limestone quarry, the shadowy labyrinths of an "Undercity", and the dark Iron Maiden dungeon. The maze-like Snowfly Forest, named for the so-called snowflies that can be found within, covers part of the city. Other locations include the Graylands, the setting for the prologue event; and Valnain, the city where the Valendia Knights of Peace's Headquarters is located. While Valendia and Leá Monde are fictitious, the game's scenery is inspired by real-life landscapes of the southwest of France, including the city of Saint-Émilion.

=== Characters ===
The protagonist is Ashley Riot, a male member of the Valendia Knights of the Peace (VKP) in pursuit of a cult leader named Sydney Losstarot. Ashley is a Riskbreaker, a militant division of the VKP responsible for upholding state security and law. Ashley's partner is Callo Merlose, an agent of the VKP Inquisitors. Although Callo accompanies him, Ashley does not accept her as a combat partner due to her lack of combat experience. Another Riskbreaker, Rosencrantz, appears during Ashley's battles in Leá Monde, briefing him on the plans of the VKP, Sydney and the Cardinal, and subsequently his take on Ashley's past. This casts suspicion on Ashley's behalf, as Riskbreakers always work alone.

Sydney, leader of the religious cult Müllenkamp that is based in Leá Monde, laid siege to Duke Bardorba's manor in search of a “key” and kidnapped Bardorba's son, Joshua. Leá Monde suffered a catastrophe when the population was killed in an earthquake. The city, filled with corpses controlled by Darkness, is the cult's stronghold. Sydney and his accomplice, Hardin, survive their pursuit by several parties, though Hardin sometimes doubts Sydney's intentions.

Also attempting to capture Sydney is Romeo Guildenstern, leader of the Crimson Blades, whose mission was undertaken without the approval of the VKP. The Crimson Blades, under direct orders of Cardinal Batistum, are a group that is part of the Cardinal's Knights of the Cross, in charge of seeking heretics and quelling cults. Romeo Guildenstern, their leader, is a pious man, deeply faithful to his belief and consequently immune to the Dark's powers. Under orders of the Cardinal, he pursues Sydney with a small army in his command and his captains: Samantha, Duane, Grissom, Tieger and Neesa.

=== Story ===
The plot of Vagrant Story, titled "The Phantom Pain", is presented as the prelude to the "story of the wanderer". Beginning in the Graylands, Ashley and Callo are sent by the VKP to Duke Bardorba's manor to investigate the Duke's involvement with Müllenkamp and the Cardinal's interest in Sydney Losstarot. Ashley infiltrates the manor and encounters Sydney, witnessing his powers first hand. Sydney escapes with his accomplice Hardin and the Duke's son Joshua, leaving Ashley with a clue to his whereabouts. This event was dubbed the "Graylands Incident".

Ashley Riot faces a wyvern during the opening sequence. The game directly switches between event cutscenes and gameplay using the same character models.

Ashley and Callo arrive in Leá Monde and a lone Ashley infiltrates the city through the underground wine cellars. Along the way, he learns of objects holding magical power known as Grimoires and the city's power to spawn the undead and mythological creatures. He encounters Guildenstern and his lover Samantha, and learns of the condition known as incomplete death and the Cardinal's true intention for his pursuit of Sydney: immortality. The Crimson Blades confront Ashley and reveals his presence to Guildenstern.

Escaping unharmed, Ashley encounters Rosencrantz who intends to join him, though Ashley declines. Rosencrantz tells him of the VKP and the Parliaments' knowledge of the dark powers of Leá Monde, and that the hidden powers deep within a person can be unleashed with the help of the Dark. In his encounters with Sydney, Ashley is shown visions of his past, where his wife Tia and his son Marco are killed by rogues. Meeting Rosencrantz again, Ashley is told that they were not his family, but mistaken targets he killed during a mission of theirs. Ashley's guilt over their deaths was manipulated by the VKP to turn Ashley into a loyal Riskbreaker. Ashley recalls his hidden battle skills and experiences "clairvoyance", seeing the progress of the Crimson Blades, which leads him to the Great Cathedral.

Sydney had captured Callo earlier and brought her with them. Callo learned that Hardin was skeptical of Sydney's plans. She begins to develop the powers of "heart-seeing", a form of telepathy, as they continue their escape deeper into Leá Monde. With her powers, she learned of Sydney's intentions and Hardin's reason to join Müllenkamp and his closeness to Joshua. Sydney left them to stop the others from advancing; taunting Guildenstern and Samantha, and provoking Ashley to follow him as he intends to bestow his powers upon Ashley. Ashley was not interested in inheriting the powers of Darkness; seeing that Callo had been captured, his only intention is to rescue her.

While discussing the Gran Grimoire, a powerful source of magic, Guildenstern and Samantha discover ancient Kildean letterings carved throughout the city walls. Rosencrantz reveals that the city is the Gran Grimoire and its power lies at the city center: the Grand Cathedral. As Guildenstern leaves for the Grand Cathedral, Rosencrantz searches for Ashley and Sydney. Finding them, Rosencrantz, confident in his immunity against Darkness, tries to force Sydney to surrender his powers. Rosencrantz also assaults Ashley to prove that he is not a suitable candidate for the powers of Darkness. Sydney refuses to listen and kills Rosencrantz by using a possessed statue, leaving Ashley to once again prove himself as his chosen successor.

Guildenstern continues on to the Great Cathedral in the center of the city, leading him to Callo, Hardin and Joshua. Interrogating Hardin about a certain "key" known as the Blood-Sin, Guildenstern reveals his intentions in acquiring the Dark's powers. Sydney arrives to teleport Hardin and the rest away, leaving him to Guildenstern. Guildenstern acquires the "key" from him and murders Samantha as his sacrifice for the powers of darkness. Ashley arrives later and listens as Sydney reveals his true intentions. Ashley then confronts Guildenstern and manages to defeat him.

Upon Guildenstern's defeat, Ashley, now bearing the "key", carries Sydney out of the collapsing city. The creatures spawned within the city begin to disappear. Callo, Hardin and Joshua escape the city, though Hardin dies and the fate of Callo and Joshua remains unknown. In the epilogue, Ashley goes to visit the ailing Duke Bardorba in his manor, although once they were alone, it was Sydney who was in the room. Sydney tells the duke that he had found a suitable heir to the Darkness in Ashley, and that their plan to inherit the powers of Darkness was successful. The duke then proceeds to kill Sydney, and he himself died soon after of unknown causes. In a report received by the VKP a week after the Graylands Incident, the duke was believed to be murdered, and Ashley became the prime suspect, though he was never found again.

== Development ==
Yasumi Matsuno, the game's producer and director, preferred to create a new game title from scratch and use design ideas from staff collaborations, rather than reusing popular characters and designs that are found in sequels. Vagrant Story is regarded as a mixture of genres, as it contains elements of role-playing in its battles and platform games when in the field map. Matsuno explained that the development team was not eager to place Vagrant Story into a specific genre, preferring to create the game with a genre of its own.

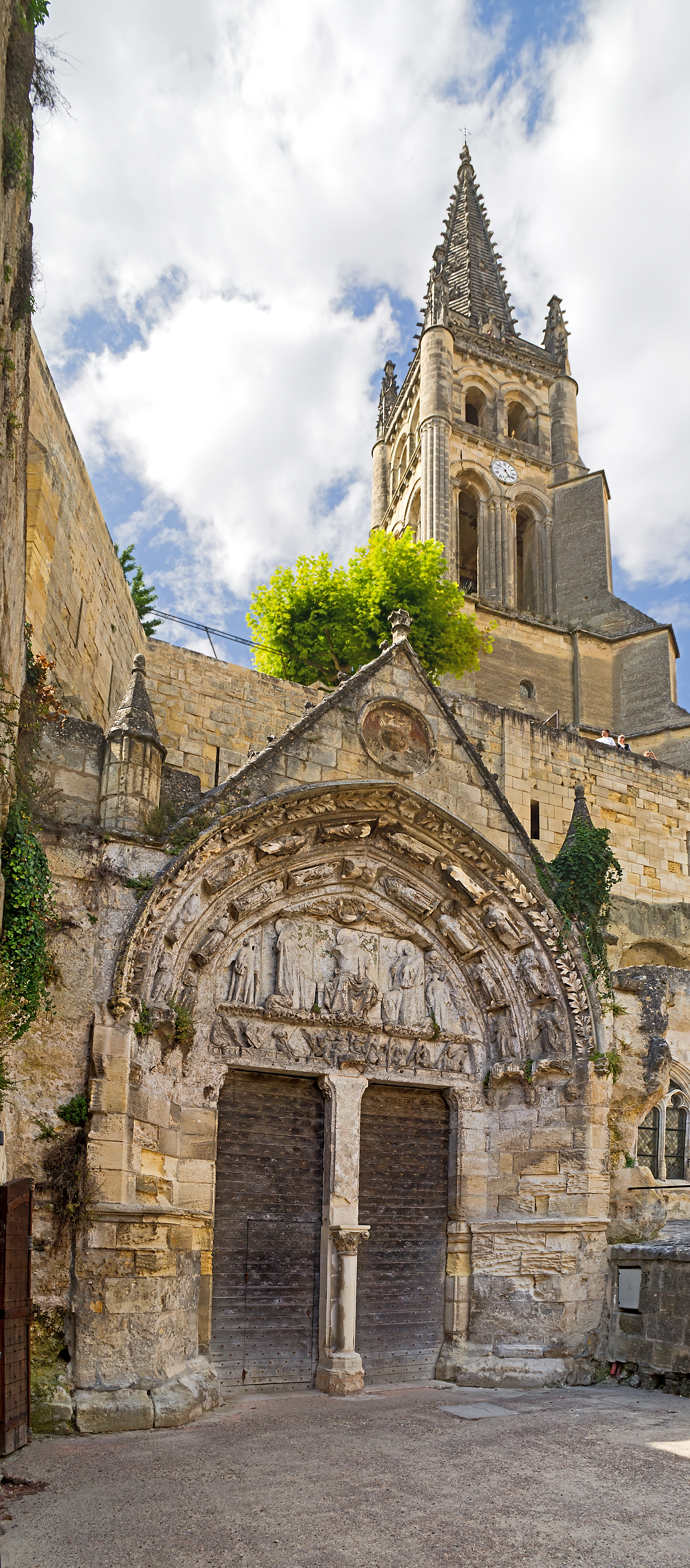
Saint-Émilion

During the design phase, Matsuno was shown photographs from France, particularly Saint-Émilion in the region of Bordeaux. This region was visited by one of Matsuno's colleagues, who was a wine enthusiast and favored Saint-Émilion, one of the largest vineyards of Bordeaux. Captivated by this small town's architecture, the design team went on a trip to France to adopt these styles into the game. A team of five people was formed in September 1998, including Matsuno and the principal persons in charge of graphics and decorations, to realize the game's setting.

Development of the game began in January 1998, spanning two years with manpower that steadily increased from 20 to 50 at peak development phase. The storyline conceived for the game follows Ashley Riot's origins as a dedicated government agent prior to being the titular "vagrant" who is "involved in many incidents" after the events in Leá Monde. Inspiration for the plot is derived from Hollywood "classic and blockbuster" films as well as European and Asian films. The gameplay was conceived to cater to hardcore gamers who do not "ask for hints and read through strategy guides". However, Matsuno revealed that over half of the game's story was cut due to capacity and development time constraints. Memory issues was considered the most challenging aspect of the game development, with the team forced to adjust the game's interface, texture mapping and polygon mesh in maps, as well as removing gaming elements such as AI-controlled supporting non-player characters that would have joined Ashley in the middle of the game.

Vagrant Story was conceived during a time when most games had made the transition into three-dimensional graphics. Games with real-time polygons were the mainstream, and it was decided for Vagrant Story to follow this trend. Murata, the main programmer, expressed his concerns in working towards a large-scale three-dimensional game for the first time. To avoid discrepancies in the frame rate caused by the large number of polygon models, the modeling team had to select an aspect of each character to focus their attention. Art director Minagawa mentioned that painstaking detail were given to each individual model, even to characters that only appear for a few seconds in the game. The same character models were used throughout the game to create a seamless transition between event cutscenes and actual gameplay. The sound effects of Vagrant Story are credited to Minoru Akao, the game's sound programmer; and Tomohiro Yajima, the sound editor and engineer.

=== Releases ===
A demo disc of Vagrant Story was included in the packaging of Seiken Densetsu: Legend of Mana in Japan. During the Square Millennium Event held by Square in Tokyo, movies of Vagrant Story such as the opening sequence and the weapon crafting system were presented to onlookers. Matsuno said that a normal playthrough would take the player five to six hours to complete.

In Japan, the game was released on February 10, 2000. In North America, Vagrant Story was released as part of Square's "Summer of Adventure" that lasted from May to September 2000. Vagrant Story was released with two discs; the first disc is the game itself, while the second disc is a demo disc released by Square to give the player a preview of seven titles. The seven titles include three interactive demos and four non-interactive demos; the former being Chocobo Racing, Front Mission 3 and Threads of Fate, and the latter Chrono Cross, SaGa Frontier 2, Chocobo's Dungeon 2 and Legend of Mana. Both discs were included in the North American release on May 16, 2000. Due to a ruling by the Quebec government that video game titles in Canada should be sold with both French and English-language instructions, Vagrant Story's release was delayed in Canada. In the European PAL release, the game did not feature the additional demo disc.

=== Merchandise ===
On April 13, 2000, DigiCube published the Vagrant Story Ultimania, the official 496-page strategy guide for the game with the ISBN 4-925075-75-6. The contents include staff interviews, a detailed background story, and information on monsters and items. The book was republished by Studio BentStuff and Square Enix in July 2006. Other merchandise include jewellery, T-shirts, cigarette lighters and posters featuring character artwork and CG renders. For the North American release, a 16-page comic-book tie-in with art by Steve Firchow, Clarence Lansang and Michael Turner of Witchblade fame was published by Eruptor Entertainment and Squaresoft. The comic was freely distributed at the Electronic Entertainment Expo 2000 and included an interview between Matsuno and Square Electronic Arts assistant product manager Andrew Shiozaki.

=== Music ===
The original score for Vagrant Story was composed, arranged, and produced by Hitoshi Sakimoto, whose previous video game works included the soundtracks to Radiant Silvergun and Final Fantasy Tactics, with additional arrangement by Takeharu Ishimoto for Track 2–30 and Hirosato Noda for Track 2–31. A Japanese orchestra ensemble, Shinozuka Group, performed for the orchestral piece of Track 2–29. All synthesizing operations are led by Takeharu Ishimoto with assistance from Hidenori Iwasaki for Track 1–1 and Hirosato Noda for Track 2–18.

Sakimoto noted that during the initial phase, he composed "bright and cheerful" tunes similar to Final Fantasy Tactics, but Matsuno emphasized music that was "more deep and heavy". Matsuno also advised him to listen to music from The X-Files for ideas on ambient scores, and Sakimoto pointed out influences of James Horner and Hans Zimmer in his compositions. Sakimoto was impressed with the dedication of the development team to the game, and expressed uneasiness trying to come up with music during the game previews. Sakimoto created themes for each character and monster, and made several changes in their melody to reflect their relationships, feelings as well as antagonistic views. The soundtrack for Vagrant Story remains to be one of Sakimoto's favorite compositions.

The album was first released on two Compact Discs by DigiCube on March 8, 2000, bearing the catalog number SSCX-10042. It was subsequently re-released by Square Enix on March 24, 2006, with the catalog number SQEX-10068/9; the re-release removed some of the original PlayStation synth reverb, yielding a slightly different version of the audio. The CDs contain 57 tracks, including two remixes and tracks that were not used in the game. Packaged with it is a small booklet featuring interviews with the composer and character artworks.

== Reception ==
Reception

Aggregate scores
| Aggregator | Score |
|---|---|
| GameRankings | 92% (43 reviews) |
| Metacritic | 92/100 (19 reviews) |

Review scores
| Publication | Score |
|---|---|
| Edge | 7/10 |
| Electronic Gaming Monthly | 9/10 |
| Famitsu | 40/40 |
| GameSpot | 9.6/10 |
| Hyper | 95% |
| IGN | 9.6/10 |
| Next Generation | 4/5 |
| Official U.S. PlayStation Magazine | 4.5/5 |
| PSX Extreme | 9.6/10 |

In May 2000, Vagrant Story was the fifth best-selling PlayStation title of the month. 100,000 units were sold in the first 20 days of the game's release, despite being overshadowed by other Square titles like Final Fantasy IX and Chrono Cross.

Vagrant Story was the third of thirty games to date, and the only game on the PlayStation, to receive a perfect score of 40 from Famitsu magazine. Review aggregator website Metacritic stated that the critical response to the game featured "universal acclaim", while GameRankings ranked it as the 15th best PS game. Multimedia news websites IGN and GameSpot praised the gameplay and story. IGN described the story as "so deep and intuitive that it'll likely please fans", and said the battle system maintains "a needed element of strategy and balance". The graphics were seen as a breakaway from the clichés of Square's contemporary titles. Extensive detail was given to the background settings and character expressions. The game's sound effects have been praised as "well done and impressive, straying from Square's synthed noise", as details such as the background audio help create a believable world for the player.

The battle system, however, was described by GameSpot as too complex for beginner players, as even hard-core players require a "comprehensive understanding" of the weapon customization system. IGN pointed out that enemy encounters can be more difficult than boss battles. 1UP.com noted that the game's inventory was too limited for the vast number of customizations possible; this was considered particularly troublesome because some boss enemies are only vulnerable to certain types of weapons.

Eric Bratcher for Next Generation gave the game four stars out of five, praising the game's story, graphics and combat system.

Alexander O. Smith is responsible for the English localization of Vagrant Story, using archaic English as compared to its straightforward Japanese version. His effort on translating Vagrant Story was described by Andrew Vestal as an "unparalleled—and unprecedented—work" of Japanese to English video game translation, "in spite of the occasional typo or grammatical hiccup", as quoted by IGN. Vagrant Story was awarded "Best PlayStation Game" in the E3 2000 IGN Awards and was nominated for "Console Action/Adventure" during the 4th Annual Interactive Achievement Awards held by the Academy of Interactive Arts & Sciences. It was a runner-up for GameSpot's annual "Best Game Story", "Best Role-Playing Game" and "Best Graphics, Artistic" awards among console games.

=== Legacy ===
Three years after its 2000 release, Vagrant Story was selected as one of Sony's Greatest Hits. Games released as Greatest Hits were sold at a lower price, often increasing units sold. Vagrant Story is also part of Ultimate Hits, Square Enix's main budget range. The game was later made playable on Sony's PlayStation Portable and PlayStation 3 consoles on the PlayStation Stores in Japan, Europe and North America.

The 2006 role-playing video game Final Fantasy XII contains several references to Vagrant Story. Terms such as Riskbreaker, Leámonde and Kildea (albeit with different spellings in the localizations), are commonly used in both games. According to an interview with Joypad, a French gaming magazine, in 2004, Yasumi Matsuno claimed during its development that Ivalice, the game world he created when he joined Square in 1995, is a complex world with a very long history and the stories of Vagrant Story, Final Fantasy Tactics, and Final Fantasy XII are said to unfold quite close on the Ivalice map. The original plan, however, was not to place Vagrant Story in the Ivalice universe. Matsuno commented in 2011 that the plot elements of Final Fantasy Tactics found in Vagrant Story were meant to be intertextual reference to the Ivalice title as a form of "fan service". Final Fantasy XIV: Stormblood referenced the game further in 2017 through the Return to Ivalice raid series, most notably by including an alternate version of the city of Valnain and Leá Monde as existing locations in its own world. The follow-up story in Shadowbringers titled Save the Queen further referenced the game, including using concepts from an unused sequel.

Vagrant Story is acknowledged as a game with an "extreme popularity" outside Japan eight years after it was first released. In October 2007, during an interview with the development team responsible for the enhanced port of Final Fantasy Tactics for the PlayStation Portable, Final Fantasy Tactics: The War of the Lions, executive producer Akitoshi Kawazu was asked about the possibility of a remake or port of the title to the PSP. Kawazu mentioned that it is "the next natural candidate for such an update", although there would be difficulty in porting the game, because it was a title that already pushed the original PlayStation to its technical limits. Kawazu also remarked that bringing the character Ashley Riot into other Ivalice titles would be difficult since, even in Vagrant Story, "there's really not that much learn(ed) about Ashley Riot".
