= René Zagger =

English actor (born 1973)

- Born: 1 June 1973 (age 53); Leytonstone, London
- Education: Italia Conti Academy of Theatre Arts
- Occupation: Actor
- Years active: 1989–present

René Zagger (born 1 June 1973) is an English actor, known for playing PC Nick Klein in The Bill from 1999 to 2004, and as the voice of Emet-Selch in Final Fantasy XIV from the Stormblood expansion onward. He has also made several guest appearances in Casualty, Doctors and Wycliffe.

== Background ==
Zagger was born in Leytonstone, London. His father is of Ashkenazi Jewish ancestry and his mother is of Sephardic Jewish ancestry. Zagger was raised a practising Jew by his parents but now considers himself to be more traditionalist. While attending Davenant Foundation School his interest in acting began affecting his attendance, so the headmaster suggested that he move to an acting school. He left his school and enrolled at Italia Conti Academy of Performing Arts.

== Career ==
Zagger's first professional acting role was portraying a young Marti Pellow in the Wet Wet Wet music video I Remember. Other roles soon followed; from 1990 to 1991, Zagger played Mike Bentley in the children's TV drama Grange Hill, and later in 1991 he played the role of "Razors" in the Granada Television series Up the Garden Path. He also had several guest roles in Minder, Casualty, Wycliffe, Dangerous Lady and The Bill.

In 1999, Zagger auditioned for the role of Dale Smith in The Bill, but the role went to his best friend Alex Walkinshaw and the character of PC Nick Klein was created for him. Zagger remained in the role for five years. Zagger left the series and took the role of Antipholus of Syracuse in the Stafford festival's production of Shakespeare's The Comedy of Errors.

In 2006, he starred as striker Johnny Fletcher in the Dream Team mini-series Dream Team 80's, the father to Harchester legend Karl Fletcher.

In 2006, Zagger filmed the historical drama, O Jerusalem, and vampire-horror film Night Junkies with Giles Alderson and Katia Winter. O Jerusalem was shown in France on 18 October 2006 and Night Junkies was released in December.

In 2006, he appeared in the BBC series Robin Hood in the episode "A Thing or Two About Loyalty" as Lambert.

In 2007 Zagger played the Israeli nuclear technician Mordechai Vanunu, who leaked the existence of the Israeli secret Nuclear Weapons plant at Dimona in 1986 and was subsequently kidnapped by Mossad in the BBC Nuclear Secrets episode "Vanunu and the Bomb".

In June 2007, he appeared in Doctor Who in the episode "Utopia" as Padra.

In July 2007, Zagger appeared as Herod in the second series of BBC/HBO TV series, Rome.

The autumn of 2008 saw Zagger guest star in two major BBC1 crime series; he played an alcoholic ex-army Tottenham Hotspur supporter in New Tricks, and an Australian, Danny, in Silent Witness.

In January 2008, he made an appearance as Colt Winchester (Colin from Winchester) in the 5th episode of series three of MIHigh called "Dark Star".

In January 2010, he made an appearance as Farris Andreou in the second episode in the second series of Law and Order UK called "Hidden".

In June 2011, he made an appearance in the TV sitcom, My Family.

From November 2011 to April 2012, he starred in Comedy of Errors alongside Lenny Henry at the National Theatre in Southbank, London.

In June 2012, he made an appearance, alongside Luke Goss, as Cesar in the feature film Interview with a Hitman, directed by Perry Bhandal.

In March 2013, he performed in the stage play Hope, written and directed by Scot Williams and co-starred with Samantha Womack and Mark Womack. The play ran at the Royal Court Theatre, Liverpool. In 2014, he joined the cast of the new musical Made in Dagenham, originating the role of Stan.

Beginning in 2018, he performed voice work for the MMORPG Final Fantasy XIV as Solus zos Galvus, eventually known as the antagonist Emet-Selch in the video game's Shadowbringers expansion, as well as its follow up Endwalker.

He appeared in Emmerdale in 2019 as Casino Mob boss Terry, later appearing in the BBC soap opera Doctors as Ross Dempster in May 2022.

He is the voice actor for the character in Warframe known as Roathe.

== Filmography ==
=== Film ===
Year	Title	Role	Notes	Ref.
1993	The Routine	Smith	Short film	
2006	O Jerusalem	Golan		
2007	Night Junkies	Psycho		
2007	The Marchioness Disaster	Hurlingham Passenger #1		
2012	Hard Boiled Sweets	Fred		
2012	Interview with a Hitman	Ceasar		
2015	Dragonfly	John Watson		
2017	Untitled (A Film)	Lee Stein		
2019	Test Case	The Man	Short film	
2024	Yellow Ticket	Mr. Valentine	Short film	

=== Television ===
Year	Title	Role	Notes	Ref.
1989	She's Been Away	Young Thomas	Television play	
1990–1991	Grange Hill	Mike Bentley	25 episodes	
1990–1993	Up the Garden Path	Roger "Razors" Razebrook	16 episodes	
1992	Second Thoughts	Gideon	Episode: "Youth and Consequences"	
1992	The Upper Hand	Elvis	Episode: "The Girl Next Door"	
1993	Magic Grandad	Blacksmith's Boy / Mechanic	Episode: "90 Years Ago: Cars and No Cars"	
1993	Minder	Stuart	Episode: "Looking for Mr. Goodtime"	
1993	Medics	Luke	Episode: "Episode #3.1"	
1993	Frank Stubbs Promotes	Baz	Episode: "Paint"	
1993, 2004, 2014	Casualty	Rick, Bob Smith, Nate Durante	3 episodes	
1995	Numbertime		5 episodes	
1995	Dangerous Lady	Johnny	2 episodes	
1995	Wycliffe	Rob Mills	Episode: "Four and Twenty Black Birds"	
1996	My Good Friend	Engineer	Episode: "Episode #2.6"	
1999–2004	The Bill	PC Nick Klein	202 episodes; also played characters in 1991, 1994, and 1997	
2003	Murder Investigation Team	PC Nick Klein	Episode: "Moving Targets"	
2006	Dream Team 80's	Johnny Fletcher	3 episodes	
2006	Robin Hood	Lambert	Episode: "A Thing or Two About Loyalty"	
2007	Nuclear Secrets	Mordecai Vanunu	Episode: "Vanunu and the Bomb"	
2007	Rome	Herod	Episode: "Death Mask"	
2007	Doctor Who	Padra	Episode: "Utopia"	
2008	God on Trial	Ezra	Television play	
2008	10 Days to War	Omar	Episode: "Blowback"	
2008	The Passion	Bird Seller	Episode: "Episode #1.1"	
2008	New Tricks	Andy Merrill	Episode: "Mad Dogs"	
2008	Silent Witness	Danny Land	2 episodes	
2009	M.I. High	Colt Winchester	Episode: "Dark Star"	
2009	The Take	Altay Nevzat	2 episodes	
2009	Law & Order: UK	Farris Andreou	Episode: "Hidden"	
2011	My Family	Neil	Episode: "A Night Out"	
2011, 2017	Holby City	Tony Digsby, Paul Szonyi	2 episodes	
2012	Dark Matters: Twisted But True	Thief	2 episodes	
2013	All at Sea	Mr. Newsom	Episode: "Carwash"	
2014	Cardinal Burns	Scooter Man	4 episodes	
2014, 2017, 2022	Doctors	Archie Lagos, Nick Assad, Ross Dempster	3 episodes	
2018	Britannia	Decimus	3 episodes	
2019	Emmerdale	Terry	4 episodes	
2022	Sherwood	CSI Madison	2 episodes	
2026	Father Brown	Eric Gramby	Episode: "The Crackpot and The Dummy"	

=== Video games ===
Year	Title	Role	Notes	Ref.
2016	Battlefleet Gothic: Armada	Captain Abridal		
2017, 2019, 2021	Final Fantasy XIV	Solus zos Galvus, Emet-Selch	Stormblood (2017), Shadowbringers (2019), and Endwalker (2021) expansions	
2025	Warframe	Vice Regent Grand Carnus Roathe	The Old Peace expansion	
