= Summoner Wars (card game) =

2009 tactical card boardgame

First Edition
- Designers: Colby Dauch
- Publishers: Plaid Hat Games
- Publication: 2009
- Genres: Tactical card game
- Players: 2–4
- Playing time: 30–60 minutes
- Age range: 9+
- Website: www.plaidhatgames.com/board-games/summoner-wars/

Summoner Wars is an expandable tactical card game designed by Colby Dauch and published by Plaid Hat Games in 2009. It was the first game released by Plaid Hat Games, which Dauch founded in 2009. The game combines faction-based card play, dice combat and movement on a grid battlefield, with each player attempting to destroy the opposing summoner.

== Gameplay ==
In Summoner Wars, each player controls a summoner and a faction deck made up of units, events and walls. Players summon common and champion units onto the battlefield, move units across the grid, attack opposing cards with dice, and use cards as magic to pay summoning costs.

A turn in the first edition is divided into six phases: draw, summon, play event cards, movement, attack and build magic. Units are generally summoned adjacent to walls controlled by the player, and movement is orthogonal rather than diagonal. The game ends when one player's summoner is destroyed.

The game was released with faction decks, starter sets, reinforcement packs and later a Master Set. The original starter sets included four factions: the Guild Dwarves, Cave Goblins, Tundra Orcs and Phoenix Elves. Expansions allowed players to customize faction decks within the deck-building rules.

== Digital version ==
A digital adaptation of Summoner Wars for iOS was released by Playdek in 2012. The app used a free-to-play model in which the Phoenix Elves were available for free, while additional factions and online play were unlocked through purchases.

== Reception ==
Summoner Wars received positive coverage for its combination of card play and tactical positioning. Jonathan H. Liu of Wired described the game as easy to learn, replayable and suitable for players who wanted two-player combat with more theme than abstract strategy games. A review in GMS Magazine highlighted the game's use of magic as a limited resource and its battlefield grid as distinguishing features from other fantasy card games.

The iOS version was also reviewed positively. TouchArcade called it a hybrid of collectible card game and small-map strategy game, while noting that its free-to-play version functioned mostly as a limited demo.

== See also ==
- Summoner Wars: Second Edition
