= Yasumi Matsuno =

Japanese video game designer and writer (born 1965)

- 松野 泰己
- Born: October 24, 1965 (age 60); Japan
- Occupations: Video game designer; writer
- Years active: 1989–present
- Employers: Quest Corporation; Square; Level-5; Algebra Factory
- Known for: Tactical role-playing games
- Notable work: Ogre Battle; Tactics Ogre; Final Fantasy Tactics; Vagrant Story; Final Fantasy XII

Yasumi Matsuno (松野 泰己, Matsuno Yasumi; born 1965) is a Japanese video game designer and writer. Matsuno was first introduced to video games in arcades while waiting for the train, and first played Space Invaders and Xevious there. He attended Hosei University for foreign policy but dropped out, and after working for a time as an economic reporter, he joined Quest Corporation.

As an employee at video game companies Quest in 1989 and later Square in 1995, Matsuno became well known for his work in the tactical role-playing game genre, specifically the Ogre Battle (1993) and Final Fantasy Tactics (1997) series, in addition to Vagrant Story (2000) and Final Fantasy XII (2006). After disruptions from staff leaving his development team, he resigned from Square Enix due to prolonged illness. During a freelance period, he worked on games for Nintendo's Wii such as MadWorld (2009). He joined Level-5 in 2011 where he helped create Crimson Shroud for the Nintendo 3DS.

In 2016, he created his own company called Algebra Factory, and during this period was asked by Square Enix to create a scenario for Final Fantasy XIV's expansion Stormblood (2017). He created a raid called "Return to Ivalice", the land of Ivalice being a setting from previous Final Fantasy games he had worked on. Matsuno was subsequently asked to create another scenario, which was titled "Save the Queen: Blades of Gunnhildr" and included in Shadowbringers, another expansion for the game.

== Early life ==
Matsuno grew up in a rural area, where he felt his only entertainment were movies, television, and books. His hobbies included making dioramas. He was particularly fond of World War II dioramas, that he used to make by researching at the local library. He would incorporate story elements into each of his creations.

His introduction to video games was playing Space Invaders and Xevious at the arcades while waiting for the train. He was fond of The Legend of Zelda and Dragon Quest on the Nintendo Entertainment System, and played heavily on the Amiga and PC, including Ultima Online. He attended Hosei University for foreign policy but dropped out after three years. Shortly thereafter he found work as an economic reporter but found the work unfulfilling. In 1989, Matsuno left his job as a reporter to work at Quest Corporation.

== Career ==
=== Quest ===
Matsuno began his career at the Japanese video game developer Quest Corporation. In 1993, he served as the director of Ogre Battle: The March of the Black Queen for the Super NES. It is the first installment of an episodic series of tactical role-playing games. Matsuno was inspired by the British rock band Queen's second album, which contained the songs "Ogre Battle" and "The March Of The Black Queen". A sea in the Ogre Battle universe was also named after "Seven Seas of Rhye". The next game he worked on was Tactics Ogre, released in 1995 for the Super NES. The political narrative of the game revolving around the reality of war were inspired by the Bosnian Genocide and Yugoslav Wars at the time.

=== Square and Square Enix ===
In 1995, Matsuno joined Square after quitting Quest. At Square, Matsuno directed and wrote Final Fantasy Tactics for the PlayStation. Similar in design and gameplay to Tactics Ogre, it was lauded for its highly intricate story. After the game's release, Matsuno and his team began development on Vagrant Story. Smaller in scope than Final Fantasy Tactics, it was highly regarded by critics and has gained somewhat of a cult following since its release. Matsuno supervised PlayOnline, Square's online multiplayer gaming software prior to its first beta release in 2001. He then served as producer for Final Fantasy Tactics Advance for the Game Boy Advance system, which shares the Final Fantasy Tactics system but has an entirely different storyline.

In 2001, Matsuno was assigned to work on Final Fantasy XII as director together with Hiroyuki Ito. He came up with the game's original concept and plot. Matsuno reportedly was temperamental and refused to come to work for a month after part of the Final Fantasy XII team had left Square Enix to join Hironobu Sakaguchi's new company Mistwalker. In August 2005, it was officially announced that he had stepped down from his position on the project due to a prolonged illness.

=== Freelance period and Level-5 ===
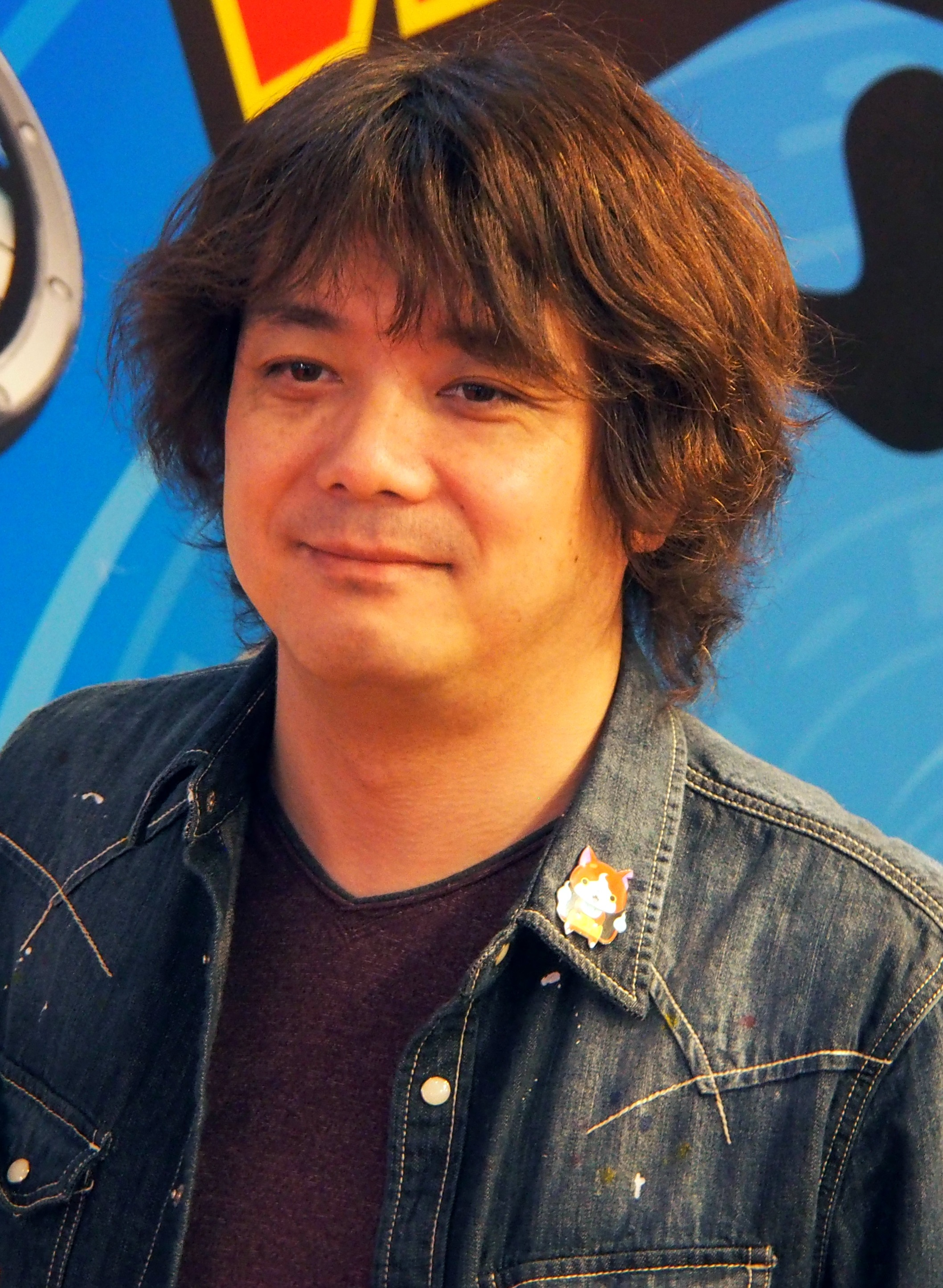
Akihiro Hino convinced Matsuno to join Level-5 in 2011.

In 2006, Matsuno expressed his interest for Nintendo's Wii console in a promotional video, stating that he was impressed with the intuitive functionality provided by the remote controller. He was approached by his friend, the PlatinumGames producer Atsushi Inaba, to work on the scenario for the Wii game MadWorld. While developing the setting, story and script, Matsuno often consulted with the development team and received conflicting orders from the staff members: the game designers wanted to emphasize extreme violence but the producers wished to tone it down instead. Matsuno's ideas and writing for the game were influenced by the necessity to balance these two different points of view. When the original developers of Tactics Ogre were assembled to work on a reimagined port for the PlayStation Portable. Matsuno was called upon to handle the game design and new story elements.

Soon after the port was finished, Level-5 president Akihiro Hino entered talks with him to convince him of joining the company. In June 2011, it was announced that Matsuno had entered Level-5 based on his impression of the Professor Layton and Inazuma Eleven series and in order to create the games he wanted to. During his stay there, he developed the fantasy RPG Crimson Shroud for the Nintendo 3DS, which is part of the collaborative project Guild 01 of Grasshopper Manufacture's Goichi Suda, Sega's Yoot Saito and comedian Yoshiyuki Hirai. Matsuno left Level-5 in October 2012 and explained "With my work done on the domestic and overseas version of my latest 3DSWare game, it was good timing for me to step down and take a short break in order to recharge for my next project." In September 2013, he announced a partnership with the American company Playdek to develop Unsung Story, a strategy game similar to Matsuno's previous titles and set in a medieval fantasy world. In 2020, Matsuno revealed that he had left the project before it was handed off to Little Orbit, the company currently developing the game; calling Playdek's version a "Final Fantasy clone". He met with Little Orbit, and they confirmed that the current game was based on Matsuno's original concept, however he had no influence on the current game; stating that "I look forward to enjoying it with the same fresh eye as any other gamer".

=== Algebra Factory ===
Matsuno founded a "planning, screenplay, and production" oriented company named Algebra Factory in 2016. During the Algebra Factory era, he was hired by Square Enix to produce the "Return to Ivalice" raid for the MMORPG Final Fantasy XIV's expansion Stormblood and once more for the "Save the Queen: Blades of Gunnhildr" storyline for the Shadowbringers expansion, and by Cygames Corporation for game drafts and management for the mobile game Lost Order.

== Game design ==
His games usually feature story driven adventures with tactical or strategical combat. He has described the development culture at Quest as having been a "kind dictatorship" while Square's was more "democratic", and is not personally fond of other team members having input on his narrative work.

== Works ==
List of video games worked on by Yasumi Matsuno
Year	Title	Role(s)	Ref.
1990	Conquest of the Crystal Palace	Planning	
1993	Ogre Battle: The March of the Black Queen	Director, game design	
1994	Philip & Marlowe in Bloomland	Director, game design	(Note: Uncredited. Released in Japan as Taiyou no Tenshi Marlow: Ohanabatake wa Dai-Panic; an unreleased English prototype from 1991 crediting Quest staff, including Matsuno, was discovered in 2020.)
1995	Tactics Ogre	Director, game design, scenario	
1997	Final Fantasy Tactics	Director, writer	
2000	Vagrant Story	Director, producer, battle design, writer	
2003	Final Fantasy Tactics Advance	Producer	
2006	Final Fantasy XII	Scenario, original concept	
2009	MadWorld	Writer	
2010	Tactics Ogre: Let Us Cling Together	Game design, scenario	
2012	Crimson Shroud	Game design, scenario	
2014	Terra Battle	"The Death of Shay and Arionne" scenario	
2017	Lost Order	Director (unreleased)	
2017	Final Fantasy XIV: Stormblood	"Return to Ivalice" scenario	
2020	Final Fantasy XIV: Shadowbringers	"Save the Queen: Blades of Gunnhildr" scenario	
2021	Final Fantasy XIV: Endwalker	Special thanks	
2022	Tactics Ogre: Reborn	Game design, scenario	
2025	Final Fantasy Tactics: The Ivalice Chronicles	Original script, scenario writer and editor	
