= Summoner Wars =

2012 video game

Summoner Wars Mobile
- Developers: Plaid Hat Games; Playdek
- Platforms: iOS, Android
- Release: July 4, 2012 (iOS); May 15, 2014 (Android)

Summoner Wars Mobile is a mobile video game developed by Plaid Hat Games and Playdek, and based on the 2009 board game of the same name. The iOS version was released on July 4, 2012. The Android version was released on May 15, 2014.

Both versions are now unavailable, having not been updated for upgraded versions of the mobile operating systems.

In 2021, the Summoner Wars: Second Edition board game was released, along with an accompanying online version.

== Reception ==
Reception

Aggregate score
Aggregator	Score
Metacritic	86/100

Review score
Publication	Score
TouchArcade	4/5

The game has a Metacritic score of 86/100 based on 5 critic reviews.

Gamezebo said "Summoner Wars is to become the flagship title in the case for digital board games. It's cheaper. It's prettier. Less hassle. Perfect multiplayer that allows you to play as often as you like. If you're a fan of strategy games, this is a must-buy. And even if you're not, the game is free to try, and you have nothing to lose." Pocket Gamer described the game as "A complex, but accessible, card-based strategy game that combines elements of Magic: The Gathering with Risk and Stratego." Eurogamer wrote "It's hard not to feel Summoner Wars is a great game, verging on superb, that's held back by a highly polished but functionally thin app. TouchArcade said the game was "A must-have for gamers who want more tactical maneuvering in their CCGs or more customization in their strategy games. However, its flaws and the price point for full buy-in mean that it's not for everyone, but being free to try and having a flexible IAP system means that it's worth checking out either way."

== See also ==
- Summoner Wars (Second Edition)
