= Crimson Shroud =

2012 video game

- Developers: Level-5; Nex Entertainment
- Publisher: Level-5
- Designer: Yasumi Matsuno
- Composers: Hitoshi Sakimoto; Kimihiro Abe; Mitsuhiro Kaneda; Azusa Chiba; Masaharu Iwata
- Series: Guild
- Platform: Nintendo 3DS
- Release: JP: November 28, 2012; NA/EU: December 13, 2012
- Genre: Role-playing game
- Mode: Single-player

Crimson Shroud (Note: Japanese: 解放クリムゾンシュラウド, Hepburn: Kurimuzon Shuraudo) is a role-playing video game developed and published by Level-5, with assistance from Nex Entertainment. It was released for the Nintendo 3DS in 2012 as part of Level-5's Guild compilation series, with it being released separately on the Nintendo eShop.

== Gameplay ==
Crimson Shroud is based on tabletop role-playing games (tabletop RPGs), using dice rolls to determine outcomes in combat.

== Development ==
Crimson Shroud was designed by Yasumi Matsuno. It was published by Level-5 as part of a compilation called Guild01, and Matsuno was given creative freedom to create a project along with other designers working on the Guild series of games. At the time of its release in 2012, it was the first video game which Matsuno worked on since Final Fantasy XII in 2006. While it was released as a part of a compilation in Japan, the English release split these four into individual releases for the Nintendo 3DS eShop. The game was composed by Hitoshi Sakimoto, who joined the project upon Matsuno's request, along with Mitsuhiro Kaneda, Azusa Chiba, Masaharu Iwata, and Kimihiro Abe. The soundtrack was released through Sakimoto's label Basiscape on June 27, 2012.

== Reception ==
Reception

Aggregate score
Aggregator	Score
Metacritic	76/100

Review scores
Publication	Score
Destructoid	8/10
Eurogamer	8/10
Game Informer	7.5/10
GamesRadar+	2/5
Jeuxvideo.com	15/20
RPGamer	2.5/5

Crimson Shroud received "generally favorable" reviews, according to review aggregator Metacritic.

IGN writer Simon Parkin felt that it was an "acquired taste," but also enjoyed its storytelling. USgamer writer Jeremy Parish counted Crimson Shroud among the best 3DS games. He noted that it was a fairly short story, but due to Matsuno's involvement, it makes it a story worth experiencing. He also praised it for its "literal" adaptation of tabletop RPGs. Jeuxvideo writer L'avis de Dharn felt that Crimson Shroud was unlike any other game on the 3DS, noting that it is a game expressly designed for a specific niche of player, citing its static backgrounds, tabletop RPG inspiration, and abundant dialogue. Destructoid writer Chris Carter called it "impressive" despite some issues, calling it "well-crafted" and "unique." Game Informer writer Kyle Hilliard felt that the simplistic approach to RPG mechanics usually helped the game, but felt it also hurt it at times. Digitally Downloaded writer Matt Sainsbury felt it was the closest a video game had come to offering a "true Dungeons & Dragons experience on a console." He included it in his list of the best Japanese role-playing games for the Nintendo 3DS. Eurogamer writer Martin Robinson praised the game for its experimental nature, noting that while it has flaws such as feeling tedious and obtuse at times, this game is "close to essential."

GamesRadar+'s Giancarlo Saldana was more critical of the game, praising the visuals and soundtrack while considering the battles "tiresome and repetitive" and criticizing it for not being clear. Engadget writer Kat Bailey noted that while it got its "hooks" into her, she likely would not have finished it if she was not reviewing it, citing how tedious it can be. Despite this, she found it "worthwhile" and a "fun little experiment." RPGamer writer Mike Moehnke felt that it was an interesting game, but found it difficult to recommend due to finding it frustrating.

Video Game Music Online writer Don Kotowski felt that certain pieces in the soundtrack evoked past Sakimoto songs' "past orchestral sound," though felt that the soundtrack frequently felt "uninspired" and lacking the breadth of his best soundtracks. Despite this, Kotowski appreciated some of the songs, including ones from guest contributors to the soundtrack.
