= Playdek =

American video game developer

- Type: Private
- Industry: Video games
- Predecessor: Incinerator Studios
- Founded: 2011
- Headquarters: Carlsbad, California, United States
- Products: Mobile games, PC games
- Website: www.playdekgames.com

Playdek is an independent video game development company founded in 2011, based in Carlsbad, California. Playdek specializes in developing board games and card games for Android, iOS, Windows, and Mac.

== Overview ==
The core of Playdek's team worked together in console game development with their previous company Incinerator Studios, a subsidiary of THQ. As part of cost-cutting measures, THQ spun off Incinerator studios as an independent studio in 2009; in chief technology officer Gary Weis' words, "We offered to take ourselves off their payroll and go off and make it on our own." After a transition period during which the developer was under contract with THQ to complete two projects, Incinerator launched Playdek, a company focused on developing tabletop games for mobile devices.

== Games ==
=== Tabletop conversions ===
Playdek has collaborated with various tabletop game publishers to develop digital versions of board and card games.

==== Board game conversions ====
- Can't Stop (2012)
- Agricola (2013)
- Lords of Waterdeep (2013)
- Twilight Struggle (2016)
- Labyrinth: The War on Terror (2022)

==== Card game conversions ====
- Ascension: Chronicle of the Godslayer (2011)
- Food Fight (2012)
- Nightfall (2012)
- Summoner Wars (2012)
- Fluxx (2012)
- Penny Arcade The Game: Gamers Vs. Evil (2012)
- Tanto Cuore (2013)

=== Kickstarter projects ===
In September 2013, Playdek announced a collaboration with Yasumi Matsuno to develop two games in the new Unsung Story series. The first was to have been a digital card game designed by Christophe Boelinger and the second a tactical RPG, Unsung Story: Tale of the Guardians. For the latter game a successful crowdfunding campaign was held in January and February 2014 on Kickstarter collecting 660,126 USD from supporters. A game release was scheduled for July 2015. In February 2016 Playdek announced that they had no resources to develop the game and no timeline to develop the project further. In August 2017, Playdek announced that Little Orbit has taken over all the rights and assets to Unsung Story from Playdek, and is now the project creator.

GMT Games launched a Kickstarter campaign in June 2014 for a video game conversion of their Twilight Struggle boardgame. The project targeted 50,000 USD and collected 391,047 USD from backers. The implementation of the video game version of the game was contracted to Playdek and released on April 13, 2016 on Steam for Windows and Mac.
