= Final Fantasy XIV: Shadowbringers =

2019 Final Fantasy XIV expansion pack

- Collector's edition cover art depicting a Dark Knight on the Grani mount, carrying Ryne
- Developer: Square Enix Creative Business Unit III (Note: now Square Enix Creative Studio III)
- Publisher: Square Enix
- Director: Naoki Yoshida
- Producer: Naoki Yoshida
- Designers: Kei Sato; Mitsutoshi Gondai; Yuichi Murasawa
- Programmer: Kiyotaka Akaza
- Artists: Hiroshi Minagawa; Takeo Suzuki; Shinya Ichida; Yusuke Mogi; Ayumi Namae
- Writers: Banri Oda; Natsuko Ishikawa
- Composer: Masayoshi Soken
- Series: Final Fantasy
- Platforms: macOS; PlayStation 4; Windows; PlayStation 5 (Note: Since May 2021); Xbox Series X/S (Note: Since March 2024); Nintendo Switch 2 (Note: Since August 2026)
- Release: July 2, 2019
- Genre: MMORPG
- Mode: Multiplayer

Final Fantasy XIV: Shadowbringers (Note: In Japanese: ファイナルファンタジーXIV: 漆黒の反逆者(ヴィランズ) (Hepburn: Fainaru Fantajī Fōtīn: Shikkoku no Viranzu; lit. Final Fantasy XIV: Jet Black Villains)) is the third expansion pack to Final Fantasy XIV, a massively multiplayer online role-playing game (MMORPG) developed and published by Square Enix for macOS, PlayStation 4, and Windows, then later on PlayStation 5, Xbox Series X/S, and Nintendo Switch 2. It was released on July 2, 2019, two years after Stormblood. As before, Naoki Yoshida served as director and producer and Masayoshi Soken composed the soundtrack. It released as a standalone product for current players; for new players, the "Complete Edition", originally launched with Heavensward, was updated to include all available expansions.

Shadowbringers takes place on the First, a parallel dimension on the brink of collapse, where the player character is summoned to rescue and restore the world. Several comrades accidentally trapped there join them, as well as Emet-Selch, an immortal villain who seeks to harness the First's apocalypse to restore his deity, Zodiark. Emet-Selch accompanies and tests the player character, confident despite their meddling. In addition to adding new areas, the expansion pack increased the level cap, debuted two character classes and two playable races, and introduced the ability to explore dungeons with non-playable "Trust" companions.

Shadowbringers received widespread critical and popular acclaim, particularly for its writing and focus on player accessibility. By December 2019, the title had reached a cumulative total of 18 million player accounts. As with its predecessors, major content patches were scheduled for every three months. These updates expanded the main story, added new features, and premiered secondary storylines including a crossover written by Yoko Taro that features characters and elements from Nier: Automata and the "Restoration of Ishgard", a long term campaign to rebuild the embattled nation in the aftermath of the Dragonsong War. The third major content patch had its release delayed by two months due to the COVID-19 pandemic.

== Gameplay ==
Gameplay at large remains unchanged from Final Fantasy XIV: players interact with each other in a responsive persistent world. Maximum level increased to 80, with changes to improve flow and preserve job identity. Tank jobs lost the penalty to damage while focused on holding enemy attention, based on player feedback. Resources, such as magic points, were rebalanced for ease of use. Two new jobs were added, Gunbreaker and Dancer. Gunbreaker, a tank, wields gunblades, taking inspiration from Final Fantasy VIII where these weapons first appeared. Dancer, a ranged damage-dealer, wields chakrams, drawing inspiration from real-world folk dances, with an emphasis on "encouraging allies". The team added a new tank job to balance the number of main and secondary tanks, and a new ranged damage dealer as one had not been added for several years. They refrained from adding a new healer job in order to maintain game balance between the three existing healers.

New to Shadowbringers, players may enter dungeons using computer-controlled "Trust" companions rather than other players. These companions vary based on when the dungeon occurs in the story, and have unique dialogue. This system takes inspiration from the Gambit system in Final Fantasy XII, and the characters are programmed to take actions reflecting their personality. Trust supports players new to or unfamiliar with online games, eliminates the wait for matching to other players when used, and provides experience points for secondary jobs. Further providing experience points, Shadowbringers quests outside the Main Scenario Quest now scale between levels 70 and 80. Role quests for the different combat, crafting, and gathering job teach aspects of these roles while expanding on the story and history of the First.

The main story of A Realm Reborn was also given a major overhaul in the 5.3 patch. Many quests and objectives deemed to be unnecessary have been removed from the main story quest for new players, especially in patch content for A Realm Reborn. Flight became unlocked for players in A Realm Reborn areas after completing its original main story. Further, a New Game Plus mode was added, allowing players to replay certain main and side story quests.

Renovations to the crafting and gathering jobs were applied across the patch cycle to improve accessibility to newcomers, removing redundant abilities and providing more information to players. These updates dovetailed with the "Ishgardian Restoration", a massive, collaborative, player-run public works project to rebuild an Ishgardian residential district destroyed in the Dragonsong War. Unfolding over the course of several patches, it provided rewards to beginners and experienced characters alike. The Diadem, a large open world area that premiered in Heavensward, was reconfigured as the source of raw materials for reconstruction. The reconstruction provided the narrative justification for a new player housing ward, the Empyreum, added in the following expansion, Endwalker. The content remains for player use, offering large sources of crafting and gathering experience.

A variety of other systems also received updates in Shadowbringers. Blue Mage, a "Limited" job introduced in Stormblood, received a major extension. Blue Mages uniquely learn actions from observing monsters, but because this allows unbalanced combinations, the job is Limited and cannot use normal player matchmaking. The update adds rewards and titles for facing difficult content with a party composed solely of Blue Mages. A new alliance-scale player versus player (PvP) mode called Onsal Hakair (Danshig Naadam) premiered with the expansion, where players participate in mock wargames preparing for the yearly Naadam, scoring points by holding locations. The Bozjan Southern Front and Zadnor are large-scale battlefield areas with a separate progression system. Players engage in skirmishes and battles with Garlean forces in Bozja, culminating in a raid on an Imperial fortress or airship to capture it for the Resistance, respectively. As a continuation of the "Return to Ivalice" storyline, it is also written by Matsuno.

== Plot ==
=== Setting and characters ===
The main characters of Shadowbringers, clockwise from top: Minfilia, Crystal Exarch, Urianger, Alisaie, the Warrior of Darkness, Alphinaud, Y'shtola, and Emet-Selch; Thancred (center)

Shadowbringers occurs on the First, a parallel world split long ago from the Source, the original setting. Eons ago, Hydaelyn sundered the world to imprison Zodiark. The Ascians, Zodiark's immortal servants, trigger Calamities on the Source to "Rejoin" its Shards. They manipulated the First's heroes to destroy too much Darkness, creating a lethal excess of Light. This Flood of Light erased everything, and everyone, outside the continent of Norvrandt. Minfilia, the player's ally and Oracle of Light, sacrificed herself to halt the Flood during Heavensward. Survivors in the post-apocalypic world resist monstrous "sin eaters", which feed on the living, warping them into more sin eaters.

Norvrandt is Eorzea's mirror on the First, unaffected by the Source's Calamities. Central Lakeland hosts the Crystal Tower, which mysteriously appeared a century prior. The Crystarium, a hard-working commune under the enigmatic Crystal Exarch grew around it. Decadent Eulmore in Kholusia pampers its wealthy citizens with indolent luxury. Lord Vauthry built this paradise with slave labor, exploiting destitute refugees. Vauthry's inspirations include Jabba the Hutt. Dwarves, the First's Lalafell, live in Kholusia's mountains as an insular Tribe of miners and blacksmiths. The Seven Sisters cliffs provided visual references for Kholusia. The Rak'tika Greatwood houses, the Ronkan Empire's ruins, and the Night's Blessed, a religious community hiding from Light beneath the jungle canopy. Angkor Wat and Mesoamerican civilizations inspired Ronkan architecture. Il Mheg is the land of the fae—pixies, fuath, nu mou, and amaro—in the valley formerly of the Kingdom of Voeburt. Finally, Amh Araeng is the desert where Minfilia halted the Flood, left as massive waves of solid Light. The Empty covers the rest of the world, a vast, lifeless white expanse.

Transitioning to Shadowbringers, the Garlean Empire also resumes its campaign against Eorzea, as Warrior's closest allies sequentially fall into comas while hearing a mysterious voice, leaving the Warrior isolated. Emperor Varis zos Galvus begins mass-producing Black Rose, a chemical weapon lethal even in tiny doses, to retaliate against Ala Mhigo's successful revolution. Garlean crown prince Zenos yae Galvus also resurfaces, seeking a rematch with the Warrior. Emet-Selch, an Ascian leader who had founded the Empire as Solus zos Galvus, accelerates his plans to destroy the First and restore Zodiark. In his unsundered eyes, modern mankind are disturbing husks, not truly alive, thus claiming no remorse for killing them.

=== Story ===
Shadowbringers opens as the Warrior and Tataru approach the Crystal Tower, hoping to restore the Scions, but the Warrior is summoned to the First by the mysterious voice: the Crystal Exarch. The Exarch, calling for the Warrior, summoned the Scions by accident, who have lived years on the First, time passing differently between Shards. The Exarch explains the impending doom: rampant Light will trigger a Calamity, destroying the First and ending Source civilization. The Warrior meets Feo Ul, an adventuresome pixie, and Ardbert, a Warrior of Darkness returned to the First. The others sacrificed themselves to halt the "Flood of Light." Ardbert was denied the chance, witnessing Norvrandt's slow decline as a shade.

The Warrior seeks out Alphinaud and Alisaie. Alphinaud investigates decadent Eulmore, while Alisaie aids a hospice for sin eater victims in Amh Araeng. With the twins, plus the Exarch and his adopted daughter Lyna, the Warrior saves the villagers of Holminster Switch, defeating a powerful sin eater, a "Lightwarden". Slaying a Lightwarden infects the slayer with its Light, creating another Lightwarden, but Hydaelyn's Blessing forestalls this. Lakeland's sky goes dark for the first time in a century. Rumors fly of the legendary "Warrior of Darkness". Lord Vauthry sends general Ran'jit to investigate, but the Exarch deflects. The Warrior joins Thancred and his ward, a girl named "Minfilia," rescued from Ran'jit. She is the latest incarnation of the Source's Minfilia, revered on the First as the Oracle of Light.

The Scions seek refuge with Urianger in Il Mheg, Feo Ul's homeland. Il Mheg's Lightwarden is the fae King, Titania, locked in their castle. The newly-minted Warrior of Darkness gathers the regalia to enter and slays Titania; Feo Ul becomes King, leading Il Mheg's defense as night returns. In the Crystarium, former Garlean Emperor Solus zos Galvus appears, introducing himself as, "Emet-Selch, Ascian." He offers truce, aid, and knowledge of his true motives. The Scions tentatively listen, travelling to the Rak'tika Greatwood seeking Y'shtola. After a tense reunion, the Scions explore the Ronkan Empire's ruins. Its protectors, the amazonian Viis, help the Scions slay Rak'tika's Lightwarden. Emet-Selch reveals Hydaelyn and Zodiark's origin: not gods, but primals, created by his people. Zodiark stopped a disaster, and Hydaelyn imprisoned Him, fearing His power. The Warrior overhears Y'shtola admonishing Urianger for his secrecy; she can see the Lightwardens' aether straining the Warrior's soul.

The remaining Lightwardens hide; the Scions seek out "their" Minfilia's soul, putting the young "Minfilia" at risk. While Thancred delays Ran'jit, the Warrior and young Minfilia go to the frozen Flood of Light. Minfilia bids the girl decide her own fate, willingly passes, and bequeaths her Oracle powers. Renamed Ryne by Thancred, she locates the remaining Lightwardens, including the final one: Vauthry himself. After the Warrior kills Ran'jit, Vauthry hides atop Mount Gulg. With many allies' aid, they give chase, and the Warrior defeats Vauthry. The Echo reveals Emet-Selch offered Vauthry's father a deal: bind a Lightwarden to his unborn son, and thus control sin eaters. The First's combined Light is too much, however, and the Warrior begins to transform. As the Exarch tries to absorb the excess Light and then flee between worlds, he is revealed as G'raha Tia, a friend from prior adventures. He disguised himself so the others would not prevent his sacrifice. Emet-Selch stops G'raha, breaking his truce, as the Warrior has failed his test. He takes G'raha to the bottom of the Tempest, the ocean surrounding Kholusia.

Ryne temporarily stabilizes the Warrior, but Light returns to all Norvrandt's skies. They learn that G'raha came from a timeline where a Light-supercharged Black Rose caused the Eighth Umbral Calamity. Battling societal breakdown, the Ironworks rallied those inspired by the Warrior. After two centuries, they opened the Crystal Tower, awakening G'raha from stasis. Combining powers from Alexander and Omega, they sent G'raha and their timeline's Crystal Tower across time and worlds. Though G'raha arrived in Norvrandt a hundred years earlier than he planned, he took this opportunity to prepare for the Warrior's arrival, fortifying the Tower into the Crystarium and leading the city as its Crystal Exarch.

The Scions pursue Emet-Selch to the seafloor, where he has overlaid ancient ruins of Amaurot, his people's capital, with an illusion of the original city, complete with citizen simulacra. Facing the Final Days, the Ancients beseeched their leaders—the Convocation of Fourteen, Emet-Selch among them—for salvation. A self-aware simulacrum, Hythlodaeus, says three-quarters of Ancients willingly sacrificed themselves, creating and empowering Zodiark, saving and restoring the world. The Convocation planned to sacrifice later life to revive these Ancients. Dissident Ancients, wishing to let new life grow independently, summoned Hydaelyn to imprison Zodiark. Emet-Selch tests the Scions again with illusions of Amaurot's destruction and the Final Days, but remains unimpressed. The Warrior nearly succumbs to the Wardens' Light before Ardbert, in truth a shard of the Warrior's soul, merges into and heals them. Emet-Selch battles the Warrior under his true name, Hades. The Warrior weaponizes the Light, forming it into an axe which they use to mortally wound Hades, while also purging it from their body and restoring Norvrandt's night sky. As he dies, Emet-Selch makes a final request that the Warrior remember his people. With the First saved and the Eighth Umbral Calamity averted, the Scions and G'raha return to the Crystarium, hoping to find a way to send the Scions home.

Meanwhile, Estinien and Gaius infiltrate the Garlean palace to destroy Black Rose. Elidibus, the last unsundered Ascian, flees Garlemald after Zenos reclaims his body. Estinien and Gaius arrive at the throne room to see Zenos murder Varis to protect the Warrior for his desired rematch. Elidibus vows to avenge Emet-Selch and Lahabrea by using "the Warriors of Light".

=== Patches ===
G'raha calls on Beq Lugg, a nu mou expert on souls, to help restore the Scions before their Source bodies expire. Meanwhile, Eulmore's citizens elect Chai-Nuzz, a neurotic yet brilliant engineer who reluctantly led the operation to climb Mount Gulg, as their next mayor. In spite of his anxiety towards his role, he works diligently to share Eulmore's bounty with all of Kholusia. The Warrior reconnects with Source allies, learning of Zenos' return, and a new Garlean civil war after Varis' death. Estinien tells of an Imperial copy of the Ultima Weapon he encountered while escaping.

On the First, the Scions reveal the truth of Norvandt's Warriors of Light: Ardbert and his comrades. Elidibus exploits their efforts, impersonating Ardbert, seemingly to awaken many to the Echo for unknown ends. He tells the Scions that the Echo is a trace of the Ancients' power, not a gift from Hydaelyn. Unable to oppose "Ardbert" without sowing confusion, the Scions continue investigating means to return home. Bringing together their combined magical knowledge from two worlds, they gradually devise a plan: the Scions will use "spirit vessels" to preserve their souls and memories, allowing the Warrior to safely ferry them across the rift between worlds, after which they can return to their bodies.

In Amaurot, the Scions find an archival hologram of the Ancient Venat, who intended to become Hydaelyn's heart, as Elidibus became Zodiark's. Elidibus interrupts, putting the Warrior through tests based on a twisted retelling of their story. Y'shtola intervenes, deducing that Elidibus is still a primal, though separated from Zodiark. Furthermore, Elidibus is the original source of the "Warrior of Light" legend, exploiting that faith to gain power.

Elidibus attacks G'raha and Beq Lugg, stealing a prototype vessel with G'raha's blood and memories to control the Tower. He summons hundreds of spectral "Warriors of Light" to impede the Scions. The Warrior of Darkness reaches the Tower and fights Elidibus, who takes the form of the legendary "Warrior of Light"; it is revealed that the Warrior of Darkness has the soul of Azem, the missing Fourteenth Seat of the Convocation, who resigned out of protest towards their plan to summon Zodiark. With the timely aid of Emet-Selch's shade, the Warrior and G'raha defeat Elidibus, sealing him in the Tower forever. G'raha's exertions fully crystallize his body, but the Warrior uses the prototype vessel to preserve his soul and memories. With the spirit vessels complete, the Warrior returns to the Source, restores their allies, then awakens the G'raha of the Source. G'raha, inheriting the Crystal Exarch's soul and memories, officially joins the Scions. Meanwhile, Zenos allies with the nihilist sundered Ascian Fandaniel, gaining the knowledge a sundered Ascian can provide, and plans his reunion with the Warrior.

With the war against Garlemald temporarily stalled, the Eorzean Alliance focuses on resolving disputes with the Beast Tribes to bring an end to their need for summoning primals. Meanwhile, Alisaie and G'raha seek a cure for primal tempering; by using an Ironworks-assembled Allagan supercomputer to modify one of Beq Lugg's spells, they succeed, healing Ga Bu, Alisaie's young kobold friend. In Limsa Lominsa, Merlwyb and the Scions resolve a brewing revolution, and peacefully cure the kobold Patriarch's tempering. Suddenly, mysterious towers begin appearing worldwide and Fandaniel reveals himself and his Telophoroi servants. With the death of Elidibus, no Unsundered Ascians remain, leaving him free to seek the destruction of all life. He threatens to raze cities worldwide with a corrupted primal dubbed "Lunar Bahamut", should the Warrior refuse to face Zenos again. The Scions investigate the towers while Krile and Tataru seek out Estinien's aid.

They convene with the Alliance in Ala Mhigo. Lyse has learned the towers can somehow temper individuals into revering Garlemald. Raubahn proposes sending Fordola and Arenvald, who cannot be tempered. After, the twins, G'raha, and the Warrior bring Estinien to Ayzs Lla to consult the great wyrm Tiamat about Lunar Bahamut. Breaking her physical and mental bindings, the shame and tempering from summoning Bahamut, they secure her aid. The Telophoroi launch an assault on Paglth'an, the Amalj'aa homeland, led by Lunar Bahamut; the Alliance comes to their aid, and the Warrior slays the primal, with Tiamat leaving to protect her remaining children. In Ul'dah, Nanamo reveals Arenvald was horribly injured and may never walk again, but shares his and Fordola's findings: Amalj'aa prisoners have summoned a "Lunar Ifrit", and other lunar primals arise. The Scions gather, and Krile proposes petitioning Sharlayan for aid against the Telophoroi. Estinien fully joins the Scions, moved by their conviction.

The Eorzean Alliance and a Confederation of the Beast Tribes convene in Ala Mhigo, set aside their differences, and unite as the Grand Company of Eorzea. Sharlayan's envoy, the twins' father Fourchenault, angrily rebuffs the Alliance, disowning his children for their "barbaric" behavior. Further, he claims that if the Final Days were coming, Sharlayan would know. The Telophoroi march their forces upon Carteneau Flats, and the Grand Company of Eorzea and Scions rush to defend aetherial confluences there, repelling the Telophoroi and their primals.

The Scions seek passage to Old Sharlayan, investigating Fourchenault's suspicious claims. As the Scions learn the Towers drain the land of aether, the Warrior sees a strange female apparition, who warns them of the coming apocalypse. Fandaniel prepares to open the "gate of the gods", while Zenos discards his katanas for a scythe, honing his skills for the rematch he demands.

== Development ==
Planning for Shadowbringers began in May 2017, about one month prior to the release of the preceding expansion, Stormblood, with a three-day "scenario writing camp" involving producer and director Naoki Yoshida and the main scenario writers, Natsuko Ishikawa and Banri Oda. The process for developing an expansion involves laying out the progression from main game to expansion in detail and categorizing these elements so that developers would not get confused between patch content and expansion content which were being created simultaneously. Expansions for Final Fantasy XIV are designed to compete with offline RPGs in length and content. For Yoshida, the theme of Shadowbringers is "challenging expectations". He wanted to challenge the assumption that "Light" equates to "good" within the story and challenge the development team to deliver an expansion that could surprise players. The Trust system subverts the expectation that an MMORPG must be played with a group. Finally, Yoshida challenged players to compare Shadowbringers to main numbered entries in the Final Fantasy series.

=== Writing ===
Yoshida instructed the writing team to fulfill three requirements with the expansion story: a story that takes place in the alternate dimension of the First, entails the player becoming a "Warrior of Darkness", and involves adventuring together with the Scions—to take advantage of the newly developed Trust system. The idea to return to the Warriors of Darkness and Minfilia on the First occurred shortly after the release of Stormblood. The writing team felt it was the right timing after wrapping up the liberation of Ala Mhigo. They also connected it to G'raha Tia and the Crystal Tower storyline from A Realm Reborn. On the First, the environment is drowning in Light. Multiple teams worked to deliver this effect of "heavy and oppressive Light" without it feeling insufferable. The art team adjusted color balance to avoid it getting washed out or make the various environments look too similar. The sound team designed a "halation" sound effect that plays in areas overflowing with Light. It manifests as an ambient sound with high and low frequencies that is intended to evoke a sense of uneasiness and suffocation. Another challenge in designing the First was setting it apart from the Source world; the different teams needed to consider how 10,000 years of diverging history would impact its culture despite featuring the same races of people.

Tying into the broader theme, Shadowbringers challenges the assumption that the history written by the victors is "right". In this vein, Oda was inspired by Tactics Ogre: Let Us Cling Together to create a more complex story. On the First, Dwarves are considered a "Beastman" race, unlike on the Source, which is an example of how the politics of victors influence the interpretation of history. Ishikawa and Oda wanted to give players a better sense of the Ascians' perspective and motivations, since they had heretofore been enigmatic. They chose Emet-Selch to convey this because of his connection to the Garlean Empire's founding. His personality draws influence from Jack Sparrow of the Pirates of the Caribbean series. The team was careful not to make him too similar to Ardyn Izunia, the villain of Final Fantasy XV. Emet-Selch explains his history in order to humanize the Ascians and help players to understand their goals. Ishikawa wrote Emet-Selch as a character whose actions are "monstrous", yet his background makes him "relatable on some level". She enjoyed evoking this tension and ambivalence in the audience.

=== Design ===
A major focus during development was to make the game more friendly to new adventurers. The Trust system was designed to help people who are primarily familiar with offline RPGs and other Final Fantasy games to practice multiplayer content without the pressure of other players. The new Dancer job was intended to be easy for beginners to pick up as well. The team made adjustments to older quest rewards to help new players catch up to their friends playing Shadowbringers more quickly. Moreover, the "story skip" and "level boost" items introduced in Stormblood were updated to allow access to Shadowbringers directly. Ishgardian Restoration and the related changes to crafting and gathering were an effort to make these systems more accessible. Finally, the New Game+ feature and streamlining the A Realm Reborn quest line together improve new players' experience at the start of their adventure. The development team reworked aspects of these quests, removing portions of some and eliminating others entirely, to improve the pacing without damaging the story. They also implemented flying gameplay in these areas. New Game+ allows players to replay expansions and quest lines that they have already completed.

Two new playable races were released alongside Shadowbringers—Viera and Hrothgar. The Viera are based on the leporine race of the same name from Ivalice video games and the Hrothgar are based on the leonine Ronso from Final Fantasy X. Players were initially only able to select females of the former and males of the latter to use as avatars. Yoshida explained that resource constraints prevented the team from adding all genders to the two races, chiefly the need to redesign and adjust the enormous library of existing equipment to fit with the new character models. Within the fiction, male Viera and female Hrothgar are extremely rare and generally seclude themselves from other societies. In choosing these two races, the development team wanted to address the audience's "overwhelming desire" for Viera as well as increase the variety of body types available with the "beastly" Hrothgar. As this was likely the last opportunity to add a new race to the game owing to the cumulative costs of implementation, the team decided to only introduce one gender of each to satisfy both of these goals. The other genders were later added due to overwhelming player demand; male Viera in the next expansion, Endwalker, and female Hrothgar in the following expansion, Dawntrail.

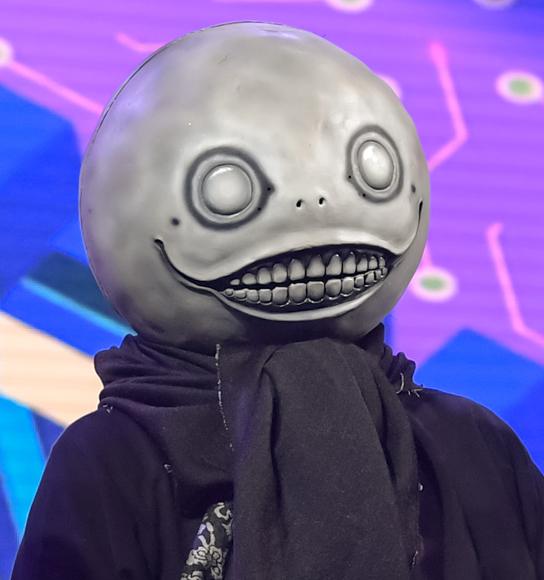
Yoko Taro wrote the scenario for "YoRHa: Dark Apocalypse", a series of raids based on Nier: Automata.

As with Stormblood, Shadowbringers features a number of guest collaborators to assist with the design. The first is Yoko Taro, who wrote a scenario based on Nier: Automata for this game's large-scale raids. Yoshida enjoys working with outside creators because they provide a different perspective and can challenge the development team to try new ideas. Yoko's producer Yosuke Saito suggested the collaboration near the launch of Nier: Automata in 2017. Players inundated the team with requests for Nier-themed costumes, but Yoshida wanted to wait to create a more thorough and in-depth crossover. In "YoRHa: Dark Apocalypse", the adventurer joins the Dwarven twins Anogg and Konogg to investigate an archaeological dig site swarming with machine lifeforms. They meet an android dressed in white named 2P who aids them in defeating the machines. In addition to the story, this series of raids borrows game mechanics and character models from the Nier games as well, the latter contributed by PlatinumGames, the developer of Nier: Automata. As Yoko is known for deleting the player's save data at the end of his games, he jokingly threatened to delete all player and server data for Final Fantasy XIV at the end of the Nier crossover story. Another guest collaborator is Tetsuya Nomura, who was invited to contribute character designs for the "Eden" raids, inspired by the creature from Final Fantasy VIII. For the design of Gaia, he received story and lore notes but had free rein to interpret them how he wished. Yoshida considers Nomura's designs to be an "essence" of Final Fantasy and desired his work to be represented in Final Fantasy XIV. Gaia was later featured in Dissidia Duellum Final Fantasy, which Yoshida found appropriate due to her modern aesthetic style. Finally, Yasumi Matsuno returned to write the "Save the Queen" storyline, a continuation of the "Return to Ivalice" arc from Stormblood. It is based on an unused idea for a sequel to Vagrant Story that was never produced.

=== Release and patch history ===
Early access to Shadowbringers began on June 28, 2019, for people who had pre-ordered the game, with the full release on July 2. To facilitate graphical enhancements, active support for 32-bit Windows operating systems and DirectX 9 rendering libraries ended with the launch of early access. To promote the expansion, Square Enix filmed a commercial in which Tom Holland undergoes strength training to become a Warrior of Darkness and his roommate, Hannibal Buress, complains that such training is unnecessary to play a video game. An Xbox version of the game was announced in November. Yoshida explained that his primary requirement for the Xbox release was cross platform interoperability with the PlayStation and PC versions. In addition to delaying the release of Patch 5.3, the COVID-19 pandemic forced Square Enix to cancel events at PAX East 2020 in Boston, Final Fantasy XIV rock concerts in Tokyo, and the three Final Fantasy XIV Fan Festival events in San Diego, London, and Tokyo.

The development team scheduled the release of a major update approximately every three months. Each of these free content patches includes a continuation of the main scenario as well as new raids, features, trials, and dungeons. Minor patches that come in between major updates focus on quality of life improvements. With Shadowbringers, Yoshida reallocated resources to facilitate the development of new types of content (e.g. Bozjan Southern Front, additional trials, etc.) by reducing the number of dungeons added in patches. As with previous expansions, Square Enix released five major patches for Shadowbringers over the course of its two-year content cycle.

Patches and expansions
Patch	Title	Release date	Notes
5.0	Shadowbringers	July 2, 2019	In the Eden's Gate raid storyline, released two weeks after launch, Thancred, Urianger, and Ryne recruit the player into restoring the global wasteland surrounding Norvrandt, the Empty, using the powers of a being believed to be the first sin eater named "Eden".
5.1	"Vows of Virtue, Deeds of Cruelty"	October 29, 2019	The 24-man "alliance raid" The Copied Factory is introduced, the first in the YoRHa: Dark Apocalypse series collaboration with Nier: Automata. Dwarven twins Anogg and Konogg recruit the player to investigate ruins near the town of Komra, accompanied by an android named 2P. Other content includes a new Ultimate raid, The Epic of Alexander; an Extreme trial against Hades; Blue Mage job updates; a new PVP map, Onsal Hakair; Ishgardian Restoration phase 1; New Game+; and Pixie beast tribe quests.
5.2	"Echoes of a Fallen Star"	February 18, 2020	The Eden raids continue with Eden's Verse, in which the player—now accompanied by Oracle of Darkness, Gaia—restores the remaining elements to the Empty. Players return to Ala Mhigo in the Sorrow of Werlyt storyline, recruited by Gaius to destroy the first of the Ultima Weapon-based prototypes, the Ruby Weapon. In Save the Queen: Blades of Gunnhildr, players journey to southern Ilsabard to aid the Bozjan Resistance in recreating legendary weapons while learning the truth about the Meteor Project. This patch also introduces the Qitari beast tribe quests, Ishgardian Restoration phase 2, and ocean fishing.
5.3	"Reflections in Crystal"	August 11, 2020	This patch was delayed two months by COVID; the development team was back to 90% capacity by June 2020 via remote work. This patch revamped the questline of A Realm Reborn and added flying to its zones. In the second YoRHa: Dark Apocalypse raid, The Puppets' Bunker, the player is joined by an android named 2B in their pursuit of the androids into a crashed installation called the Bunker. The Sorrow of Werlyt storyline continues with a fight against the Sapphire Weapon. Additional features include Unreal trials to update old fights; Dwarf beast tribe quests; Ishgard Restoration phase 3; the Bozjan Southern Front; and a large upgrade to both the Free Trial and the Starter Edition.
5.4	"Futures Rewritten"	December 8, 2020	The Eden raids conclude with Eden's Promise, in which the player defeats the Ascian Mitron, who transformed into Eden. The Sorrow of Werlyt storyline continues in this patch with the Emerald Weapon trial. Additional features include the final phase of Ishgardian Restoration, an expansion to the Blue Mage job, and the Save the Queen raid Delubrum.
5.5	"Death Unto Dawn"	April 13, 2021	This patch, released in multiple parts, sets the stage for Endwalker. The YoRHa: Dark Apocalypse storyline concludes with The Tower at Paradigm's Breach raid, in which the player defeats an otherworldly deity known as Her Inflorescence. The Sorrow of Werlyt concludes in the final trial against the Diamond Weapon. "Death Unto Dawn" adds the electric guitar for the Bard's Performance Mode, based on the Fender Stratocaster collaborative guitar.

=== Music ===
Masayoshi Soken composed the majority of the expansion's score—over 50 tracks—in addition to his duties as sound director. Nobuo Uematsu was not able to contribute due to health concerns. As such, Soken was in charge of writing the main theme, "Shadowbringers". He wanted to defy expectations about making another orchestral title track. Consequently, "Shadowbringers" is the first main theme in the Final Fantasy series that uses guitar as the lead instrument. Jason C. Miller of Godhead provided vocals for the song alongside Amanda Achen-Keenan. Soken's favorite song from the soundtrack is "Tomorrow and Tomorrow", also sung by Achen-Keenan, which serves as a reflection of the main theme. The two songs have similar introductory phrases but "Shadowbringers" is in a minor key, whereas "Tomorrow and Tomorrow" is in a major one, symbolizing the diverging paths that life can take. Ishikawa explained that the latter is about passing the torch to another generation. The perspective of the singer is intentionally ambiguous and could plausibly refer to many characters. Soken used tracks that were rearranged from earlier expansions as opportunities to train junior members of the sound team.

Final Fantasy XIV: Shadowbringers Original Soundtrack features music from Patch 4.4 through to the expansion, totaling 88 tracks. The album was released by Square Enix on Blu-ray Disc on September 11, 2019, and includes a code for an exclusive "Wind-up Suzaku" in-game pet. Fran Soto of Hardcore Gamer praised the dark atmosphere and "modern sound" of the soundtrack, including the lyrical flourishes of "Shadowbringers". Justin Olivetti of Massively OP preferred "Insatiable", the boss battle theme, for its "pulse-pounding beat". In their review of the game, Heather Alexandra of Kotaku commended Soken's versatility and ability to heighten story beats with his music. She singled out "Neath Dark Waters", the theme for Amaurot; the metronomic tick-tock in the background counts down to the doom of this civilization. Caitlin Argyros of RPGFan likewise noted this piece as an example of Soken's gift for rearrangement. She also enjoyed the recurring motifs from the "Shadowbringers" main theme throughout the soundtrack. A fan favorite track was "Civilizations", the daytime theme for Rak'tika Greatwood; its main lyric "la hee" became an infamous earworm in the community.

In May 2021, during the Final Fantasy XIV Digital Fan Festival, Soken revealed that he received chemotherapy for cancer treatment throughout most of 2020, adding that the cancer was in remission. Soken kept the treatment hidden from most of the development team, doing some of his work for Shadowbringers's patch content from hospital.

== Reception ==
Reception

Aggregate score
Aggregator	Score
Metacritic	PC: 90/100; PS4: 91/100

Review scores
Publication	Score
Destructoid	9.5/10
Game Informer	9/10
IGN	9.5/10
PC Gamer (US)	94/100
PCGamesN	8/10
USgamer	4.5/5
PC World	4.5/5

Shadowbringers was the highest rated Final Fantasy title since Final Fantasy XII in 2006. Many critics regarded it as the best Final Fantasy story in years, with some considering it a contender for best Final Fantasy game. According to review aggregator Metacritic, it received "universal acclaim" for both PC and PlayStation 4 versions, based on 25 and 18 reviews, respectively. Square Enix disclosed in an investor report that the expansion contributed to the company's increased net sales, operating income, and paying subscribers. Two million players joined the game in the first six months since the expansion's launch in July 2019 for a global total of 18 million.

Virtually all reviewers extolled the strength of the story and writing. Chris Carter of Destructoid and Steven Messner of PC Gamer called Shadowbringers the "Avengers: Endgame of Final Fantasy XIV" for the way it pays off storylines from previous expansions. Mike Williams of USgamer observed that a central theme for Shadowbringers is "how people grow and twist in times of great despair". He pointed to the contrast between the altruistic cooperation of the Crystarium and the selfish hedonism of Eulmore as possible responses to a dying world. Julia Lee of Polygon compared Eulmore to the class divides physically represented by the plates in Midgar from Final Fantasy VII. A number of critics observed parallels between the First's Flood of Light and the creeping yet catastrophic effects of climate change. Heather Alexandra of Kotaku lamented that economic inequality would likely lead to slave-driven enclaves like Eulmore in the real world after a climate-related collapse. They further linked the "unchecked energy of creation" that destroyed Amaurot to human ingenuity's role in causing the climate crisis.

The characters of Shadowbringers, particularly Ardbert, Elidibus, and Emet-Selch, earned critical acclaim as well. Kyle Campbell of IGN said Ardbert "stole the show" while debriefing the hero after each mission. Natalie Flores of VG247 felt that Emet-Selch was a true foil to the main character and that the writing for his character was a high water mark for the series. She commended scenario writer Natsuko Ishikawa for balancing him as a sympathetic villain without justifying his reprehensible supremacist beliefs. Messner called Emet-Selch the "best Final Fantasy nemesis since Kefka". Alexandra appreciated the "adversarial" but "genuinely playful" dynamic that he brought to the group. She attributed part of his appeal to his voice actor, René Zagger. Natalie Flores from Vice called Elidibus a "chilling adversary" and "populism incarnate", while Chingy Nea from Kotaku lauded him as one of the most brilliant and memorable villains in the entire Final Fantasy series, "a fascinating character with a compelling and metatextual emotional arc". The voice cast overall was well received. Many reviewers also enjoyed the immersive quality of Trust companions' dialogue and preferred to explore dungeons for the first time using Trusts as a result.

Another focal point of praise was the game's friendliness to new players. Despite its connections to past story beats, setting the expansion in a new world allowed the writers to reintroduce existing characters. Chia Contreras of Waypoint compared Shadowbringers favorably to the new player experience for Destiny 2. Multiple commentators looked to the Trust system as valuable, both for aiding new and experienced players in learning mechanics and for improving wait times for dungeons. Daniel Tack of Game Informer and Leif Johnson of PC World cautioned against buying the paid "story skip" and "level boost" items, instead recommending players to experience the story for themselves. However, Contreras appreciated the onboarding tutorials that accompany these items.

Critics took note of the game's setting on another world. The region of Il Mheg was commonly used as an example of the expansion's diverse color palette; Lee said it "doesn't look like anything else we've seen in Final Fantasy XIV". Williams likewise complimented Lakeland for its "vibrant purple forest that leads to the magnificent crystal tower at the center of the Crystarium". Carter considered Amh Araeng too similar to other desert areas in the game but agreed that the rest of the new regions were impressive. Gameplay reception focused on the new jobs and the pacing. Between Gunbreaker and Dancer, the latter received far more plaudits. Campbell remarked on the synchrony between the job's theming and its gameplay, calling it "as exciting as it is full of utility". In contrast, Williams opined that Gunbreaker lacked a defining feature and did not "particularly excel in any one area". With respect to pacing, Tack and Messner both criticized the use of "fetch quests" but felt that the narrative hid them well. Alexandra found some parts of the story dragged, such as Amh Araeng, but the high points far outweighed them.

Reviewers considered Shadowbringers to be the culmination of Final Fantasy XIV's redemption arc, from its disastrous 2010 launch to its rebirth to now. Despite largely following the "formula cemented back in [A Realm Reborn]", Carter enjoyed the consistency and said the game is "arguably the best it has ever been". Johnson called Shadowbringers a titan of the MMORPG genre that "towers so far over its contemporary rivals that it drowns them in its shadow". During the 2019 awards cycle, it won "Best MMO" from RPGFan, as well as "Best Expansion" from PC Gamer and Massively OP. IGN and PlayStation Blog named it "Best Ongoing Game". RPGFan also awarded it "Game of the Year". Emet-Selch was voted the sixth greatest Final Fantasy character in NHK's Grand Poll by Japanese fans, and ranked among the 70 best video game characters of the 2010s decade by Polygon. In 2020, Shadowbringers won the Famitsu・Dengeki Game Award for "Best Online Game" and the SXSW Gaming Award for "Excellence in Multiplayer". During the 23rd Annual D.I.C.E. Awards, the Academy of Interactive Arts & Sciences nominated Shadowbringers for "Role-Playing Game of the Year".
