= Conquest of the Crystal Palace =

1990 video game

- North American cover art
- Developer: Quest
- Publishers: JP: Quest; NA: Asmik Corporation of America
- Designers: Takaharu Mita; Yasumi Matsuno
- Programmer: N. Nagase
- Artists: Ginga Teiou; Masanori Hara; Naoto Nakazawa
- Composer: Mitsuyasu Tomohisa
- Platform: Nintendo Entertainment System
- Release: 1990
- Genre: Platform
- Mode: Single-player

Conquest of the Crystal Palace, known in Japan as Matendōji (魔天童子(まてんどうじ); "Demon Heaven Boy") is a 1990 platform game developed by Quest and published by Asmik Corporation of America (subsidiary of J:COM) for the Nintendo Entertainment System.

== Story ==
Years prior to the events of the game, the Kingdom of the Crystal Palace was conquered by an evil being named Zaras, who crowned himself king. Only Zap, a dog who served as a Keeper of the Crystal Palace, and Farron, the kingdom's infant prince, managed to escape. As the game begins, Zap explains to a now-teenage Farron that the time has come to retake the Crystal Palace, giving the prince one of three magical crystals that grant special powers to their user.

Farron's quest takes him through five perilous realms filled with bizarre enemies, with aid for the prince coming only through Zap, a shopkeeper named Kim who doubles as a hint-dropping news reporter, and the kidnapped Crystal Princess who bestows the Moon Mirror upon Farron if he manages to free her.

== Gameplay ==
Conquest of the Crystal Palace is an 2D action platform game. At the beginning of the game the player is given a choice between three crystals: a "Flight" crystal that increases Farron's jump height, a "Life" crystal that increases Farron's health, and a "Spirit" crystal that gives Farron unlimited use of a fireball attack. All of the crystal's effects can be temporarily replicated by power-ups that are dropped by defeated enemies or purchased through Kim's store. Farron's primary method of attack is his sword, though scrolls can be found or purchased to give Farron long-range abilities, and Zap can be summoned to damage enemies.

== Development ==
Conquest of the Crystal Palace was developed and published by Quest in Japan, and published by Asmik in the United States. It marked the first collaboration between the game's planner Yasumi Matsuno and composer Masaharu Iwata, who went on to work together on titles such as Ogre Battle: The March of the Black Queen, Tactics Ogre: Let Us Cling Together, Final Fantasy Tactics, and Final Fantasy XII.

As was the case with many NES games, Conquest of the Crystal Palace was subject to significant alteration for its US release. Enemies and stage components that resembled ghostly children were altered to insects and generic rocky terrain. The game's difficulty was generally reduced, and a cheat code was added that allowed the player to restore their health to full, make themselves invincible, or give themselves extra lives at any time.
