= Lords of Waterdeep =

Board game

- Designers: Peter Lee; Rodney Thompson
- Illustrators: Eric Belisle; Steven Belledin; Zoltan Boros; Noah Bradley; Eric Deschamps; Wayne England; Tony Foti; Todd Harris; Ralph Horsley; Tyler Jacobson; Ron Lemen; Howard Lyon; Warren Mahy; Patrick McEvoy; Jim Nelson; William O'Connor; Adam Paquette; Lucio Parrillo; Dave Rapoza; Richard Sardinha; Mike Schley; Andrew Silver; Anne Stokes; Gábor Szikszai; Matias Tapia; Kevin Walker; Tyler Walpole; Eva Widermann; EricWilliams (I); Matt Wilson (I); Sam Wood; Ben Wootten; James Zhang
- Publishers: Wizards of the Coast
- Publication: 2012
- Genres: Dungeons & Dragons
- Players: 2-5
- Playing time: 60–120 min
- Website: https://dnd.wizards.com

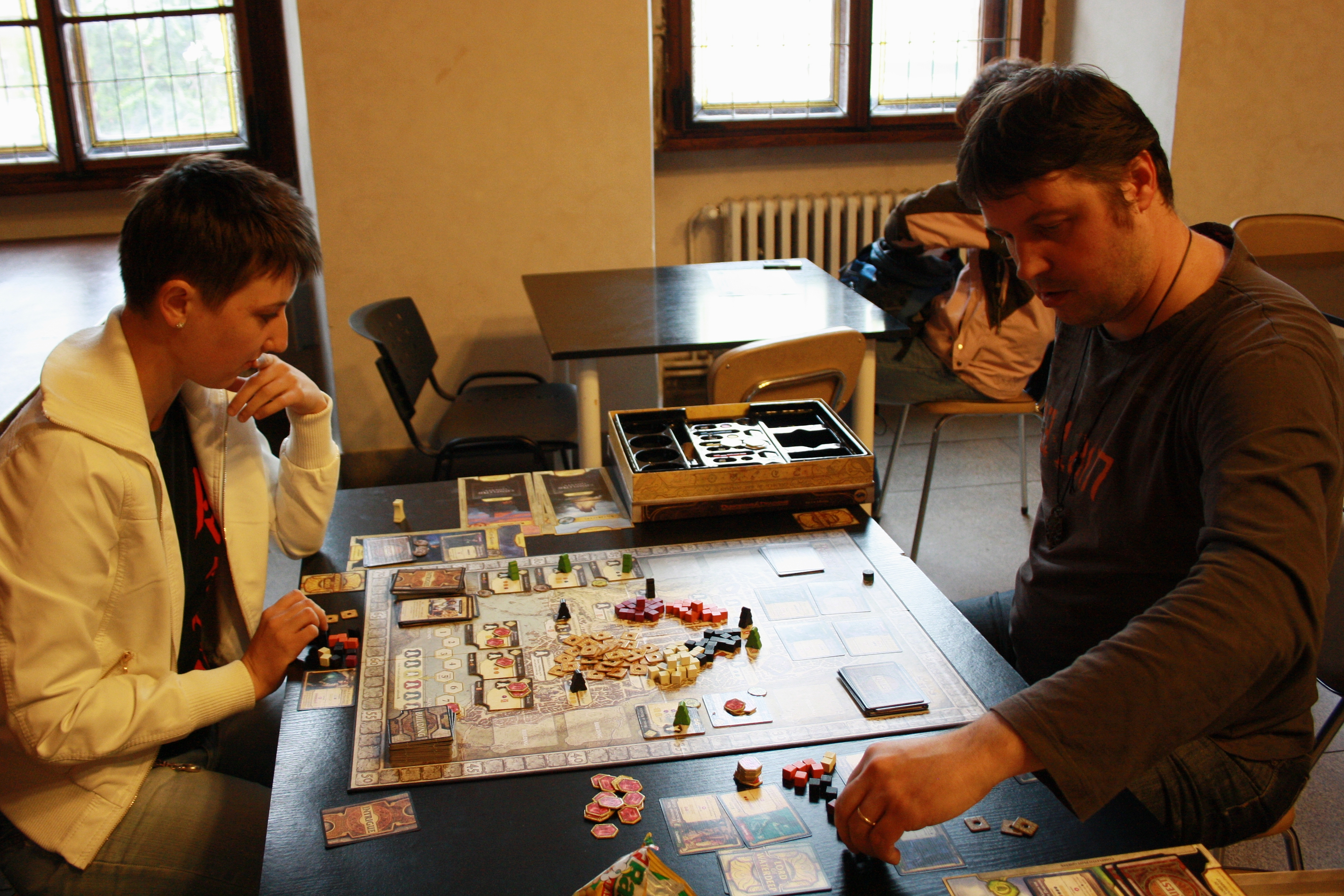
A game of Lords of Waterdeep

Lords of Waterdeep is a German-style board game designed by Peter Lee and Rodney Thompson and published by Wizards of the Coast in 2012. The game is set in Waterdeep, a fictional city in the Forgotten Realms campaign setting for the Dungeons & Dragons role-playing game. Players take the roles of the masked rulers of Waterdeep, deploying agents and hiring adventurers to complete quests and increase their influence over the city.

In 2013, Wizards of the Coast released the only expansion to date called Scoundrels of Skullport and an iOS version of the base game in collaboration with Playdek.

== Gameplay overview ==
Lords of Waterdeep is a strategy board game for 2-5 players (up to 6 players with the expansion). Each player is a different masked Lord of Waterdeep who as a group rule the city in secret, seeking to gain control of both its treasures and its resources. The players use their agents to recruit adventurers to complete a number of quests, which earn rewards (usually victory points and other rewards) and expand that lord's influence in the city. The various adventurer resources, represented as orange, black, purple, and white cubes, are based on the four classic D&D character classes: fighters, rogues, mages, and clerics, respectively. There are also five different types of quests, each typically favoring one type of adventurer; they are Warfare, Skullduggery, Arcana, Piety, and Commerce, which has a focus on the in-game currency.

Each player is dealt one of the Lords of Waterdeep, which is kept face down. They are allowed to look at the Lord at any time. Each Lord gives a player points at the end of the game for completing certain types of quests or controlling buildings.

Lords of Waterdeep is primarily a worker placement game with elements of card drafting. Players place their agents on various spaces around the city which allows them to take actions like collect money (gold), gather adventurers (resources), draw or play Intrigue cards (single-use special abilities), or gain Quests (the fundamental way to earn Victory Points). After eight rounds of worker placements, the player with the most Victory Points wins the game.

== Contents ==
Lords of Waterdeep includes:

- a game board
- a rulebook
- 5 cardstock mats for each player
- 121 Intrigue, Quest, and Role cards
- 100 wooden cubes (white, black, orange, purple)
- 5 agent meeples in five different colors (black, red, yellow, green, blue)
- 2 meeples in White and Gray representing the Ambassador and Lieutenant
- 5 score pieces (one of each color: black, red, yellow, green, blue)
- cardstock tiles and tokens used to represent buildings, gold coins, and victory points

== Factions ==
Each color in the game represents a faction from the Forgotten Realms. The factions are as follows:

- Yellow - Knights of the Shield
- Black - City Guard
- Blue - Silverstars
- Green - Harpers
- Red - Red Sashes
- Gray (Expansion color) - Gray Hands

== Scoundrels of Skullport ==
In August 2013 Wizards of the Coast released an expansion to the game titled Scoundrels of Skullport. It consists of two expansion modules – Undermountain and Skullport – that can be used to expand the base game separately or in tandem. The expansion has won the Dice Tower Award for Best Board Game Expansion of 2013.

=== Contents ===
Scoundrels of Skullport includes:

- 3 new game boards (Skullport, Undermountain and the corruption track)
- 6 agent meeples for a new gray-colored faction called the Gray Hands
- 1 more agent meeple for each of the colors from the base game (Black, Red, Blue, Green, Yellow)
- 25 corruption tokens
- 6 new Lords of Waterdeep cards
- 50 new Intrigue cards
- 60 new quest cards
- 24 new building tiles
- 16 adventure caravan tokens (4 for each of the four adventurer types, representing 5 adventurer cubes each)

=== Gameplay ===
Undermountain adds a new mechanic to the game in the form of placing resources on the game board spaces. This can be things like adventurers or even gold. Undermountain buildings are generally more rewarding than normal buildings. For example, one of the new buildings "The Citadel of the Bloody Hand" gives the player 4 fighters when players use it (the owner gets 2 fighters) and then the player must place 1 fighter on 2 different spaces on the board. When a player puts an agent on a space where such resources have been placed, that player gets what the space would normally give them for placing there plus any resources that are on that space. Undermountain quests also tend to be very expensive, but also very rewarding, granting up to 40 victory points at once.

Skullport adds another new mechanic to the game called corruption. There is a game board for corruption called the corruption track. There are 25 corruption tokens in the game – one token at the -1 value with three tokens on the rest up to -9. At the end of the game each corruption players have is worth a number of points equal to the highest numbered empty corruption space. So if there is 1 corruption on -5 and no corruption on -4, all corruption tokens in players taverns are worth -4 points at the end of the game. Skullport buildings, like with Undermountain, can also yield greater resources than the base game building, but they tend to also give the player corruption tokens. However, some Skullport buildings and cards will allow a player to return corruption to the track or remove corruption from the game entirely.

== Digital versions ==
An iOS version of Lords of Waterdeep was developed by Playdek and released by Wizards of the Coast on November 21, 2013. Versions for both Android and Steam were released on September 1, 2017.

== Reception ==
According to Ben Kuchera of Penny Arcade, Lords of Waterdeep "has players hiring adventurers and vying for control of a single city".

Erik Kain of Forbes said: "For a quick, entertaining game that requires actual thought, you could do much worse. It may not satisfy your dice-rolling, dungeon-crawling needs, but it's a wonderful game of intrigue in one of the Forgotten Realms' most notorious urban settings".

Board Games Land have mentioned that the game "strikes a great balance between a light strategic gameplay and accessibility". A review at Ars Technica stated that the game is a "perfect introduction" to worker placement board games with simple rules.

Andrew Zimmerman Jones of Black Gate commented that "the folks over at Dungeons & Dragons have definitely come up with a quality product in Lords of Waterdeep. After years of being an Adventurer caught in the intrigues of others, it's nice to assume the role of puppet master". In another review in Black Gate, John ONeill said: "Forget strategy — I want a game where I can play to my strengths. Backstabbing and subterfuge, that's what I'm good at".

DieHard GameFan said that "if you're looking for a new board game for the family that sates your D&D craving with a nice Euro-style board game twist, definitely pick up Lords of Waterdeep".

Wired.com commented that "Lords of Waterdeep is an immersive, satisfying worker placement Eurogame with a lot to offer".

== Awards and honors ==
- 2013 Origins Awards Best Board Game Winner
- 2013 Origins Awards Best Board Game Nominee
- 2012 Meeples' Choice Nominee
- 2012 Guldbrikken Special Jury Prize Winner
- 2012 Golden Geek Best Strategy Board Game Nominee
- 2012 Golden Geek Best Family Board Game Nominee
- 2012 Golden Geek Best Board Game Artwork/Presentation Nominee
- 2012 ENnie for Best RPG Related Product Silver Winner
- 2012 ENnie for Best RPG Related Product Nominee
- 2012 Charles S. Roberts Best Science-Fiction or Fantasy Board Wargame Nominee
