= Dead of Winter: A Cross Roads Game =

Semi-Cooperative strategy board game

Dead of Winter
- Designers: Jon Gilmour and Isaac Vega
- Publishers: Plaid Hat Games
- Publication: 2014
- Players: 2 to 5
- Setup time: approx. 5 minutes
- Playing time: 60 to 120 minutes
- Age range: 12 years and up
- Skills: Resource management, Strategy, bluffing
- Website: Fantasy Flight Games - Dead of Winter

Dead of Winter is a semi-cooperative survival strategy board game for two to five players designed by Jonathan Gilmour and Isaac Vega through Plaid Hat Games. The game is set in a post-apocalyptic, zombie-infested colony. Players are faction leaders who must work together to ensure the colony's survival through incoming zombies and lack of supplies. In addition, players have individual, secret win conditions that they must meet to be victorious.

== Gameplay ==
The game is played over a set of rounds, during which the players will use dice to have their survivors execute actions. These actions can include scavenging locations for supplies, which can be weapons, food, fuel, medicine, or new survivors, attacking zombies and other survivors, clearing trash, and building barricades. There are also other actions that don't require action die though, like moving survivors, playing or handing off cards, and contributing cards to the crisis. Each game will be one of twenty possible scenarios. Each scenario has a starting morale level, a starting zombie presence, a 'game length' in round number and a unique 'team' victory objective. The game can end in three ways: morale reaches 0, the players run out of rounds, or the main objective is completed.

After each player has completed their actions for the round, a set of effects will resolve, generally to make the game slowly more difficult for the players. Each survivor at the colony will consume food, and all survivors will attract zombies. These environmental difficulties are compounded by each player having a unique and possibly conflicting victory objective as well as repeated crises combine to create a difficult game to win.

== Release and expansions ==
The first edition was published in 2014.

Plaid Hat Games released the Dead of Winter: Kodiak Colby promotional expansion. In April 2015, Plaid Hat Games developed and released the Dead of Winter: Felicia Day promo cards for International TableTop Day. Both mini-expansions offer an additional character and crossroads card.

A standalone expansion for the game, entitled Dead of Winter: The Long Night was announced in early 2016. The expansion would include a set of new survivors, locations, crises, objectives, and items. It can be played as an individual game or in combination with Dead of Winter.

Another expansion Warring Colonies was released in 2017 and adds 15 new survivors, 50 additional crossroad cards, and close to 50 new items.

In 2015, Plaid Hat Games released a Crossroads Cards App for Android and iOS devices. The app serves as a virtual deck of the crossroads cards. The app allows players to exclude mature or co-op cards from the deck as needed, have the cards be professionally narrated, and turn on spooky sound effects to enhance the gaming experience.

== Awards and nominations ==
Dead of Winter has been nominated and won numerous awards:

1. 2015 Origins Award for the category Best Board Game.
2. 2014 Golden Geek Most Innovative Board Game Winner
3. 2014 Golden Geek Best Thematic Board Game Winner
4. 2014 Meeples' Choice Nominee
5. 2015 As d'Or - Jeu de l'Année Nominee
6. 2015 Origins Awards Best Board Game Nominee
7. 2015 SXSW Tabletop Game of the Year Nominee
8. 2015 Tric Trac Nominee

== Reception ==
Felicia Day's YouTube channel Geek & Sundry featured Dead of Winter in the third season of their web series TableTop.

In 2015, Geek & Sundry later created a spoof of the board game. The short video features Brandon Routh as Buddy Davis, Felicia Day as Olivia Brown, Jeff Lewis as Forest Plum, Amy Okuda as Annaleigh Chan, and Ify Nwadiwe as Harman Brooks.

Board Games Land have included the game in the top 10 zombie board games ever made.

We The Nerdy mentioned that the game is "brilliantly stressful and yet so much fun to play"

In a review of Dead of Winter in Black Gate, E.E. Knight said "For those looking for a decision-heavy brain-picker of a game with loads of strategic considerations, I can't recommend Dead of Winter enough."

== Reviews ==
- Casus Belli (v4, Issue 13 - Jan/Feb 2015)
