= Unsung Story =

- Developer: Little Orbit
- Composer: Hitoshi Sakimoto
- Engine: Unity
- Platform: Windows
- Release: December 17, 2020 (early access)
- Genre: Tactical role-playing
- Mode: Single-player

Unsung Story is an upcoming tactical role-playing game developed by Little Orbit. The game was announced via the crowdfunding platform Kickstarter in early 2014 by developer Playdek, and originally marketed as being under the creative direction of Yasumi Matsuno and was meant to be a spiritual successor of Final Fantasy Tactics (1997), a game he directed.

== History ==
=== Original concept ===
Matsuno announced the project in September 2013, before moving to Kickstarter in January. The project raised $660,126 off a projected 2015 release. Artist Akihiko Yoshida and composer Hitoshi Sakimoto were also attached to the game.

By September 2015, the game was delayed into 2016. In February 2016, Playdek announced that development had been stopped for lack of resources. This also marked the end of the involvement of Yasumi Matsuno with the project, though it was still marketed as is sometime in the future.

=== Change of developer ===
In August 2017, Playdek announced that Little Orbit would continue the game's development in their place, with Little Orbit buying all of the rights and assets and starting development from scratch.

=== Early access release ===
Unsung Story was released in early access for Windows on December 17, 2020. The early access version offered Chapter 1 of the game that consist of 7 missions and approximately 4 hours of gameplay. Ports for macOS, Linux, iOS, Android, Nintendo Switch, PlayStation 4, and Xbox One were planned at full release.

In 2021, Matthew Scott of Little Orbit shared to Kickstarter that Matsuno not been involved with day-to-day development of the game since 2018, and felt uncomfortable with his name being used in connection with the game. As a result, Little Orbit stopped using his name in the game's marketing.

The early access release was met with mostly negative reviews and Little Orbit were working to improve the game up to 2022, however the last time the game did receive an update was in 2021.

Since 2023 Little Orbit faced difficulties and no progress on the game was made until the October 2024 announcement that the work on the game would be resumed.
