= Mice and Mystics =

2012 board game by Jerry Hawthorne

- Designers: Jerry Hawthorne
- Publishers: Plaid Hat Games
- Publication: 2012
- Players: 1 to 4
- Age range: 7 years and up
- Skills: Dungeon crawl

Mice and Mystics is a fantasy-themed dungeon crawling cooperative board game designed by Jerry Hawthorne and published by Plaid Hat Games in 2012. In the game, the players take on the roles of fantasy characters transformed into anthropomorphic mice on a quest to defeat an evil witch. The game has been praised for its original theme, with players' characters using buttons and needles instead of shields and swords, and fighting rat warriors and cats instead of goblins and dragons. It has also received positive reviews for its innovative idea to use a storybook as the gameplay map.

== Awards ==
- 2013 Golden Geek Best Board Game Artwork/Presentation Nominee
- 2013 Golden Geek Best Board Game Artwork/Presentation Winner
- 2013 Golden Geek Best Family Board Game Nominee
- 2013 Golden Geek Best Thematic Board Game Nominee
- 2013 UK Games Expo Best Boardgame Nominee
- 2013 UK Games Expo Best Boardgame Winner
- 2014 As d'Or - Jeu de l'Année Nominee
- 2014 Lys Passioné Finalist

== Reception ==
Since its release in 2011, the game has been consistently ranked in around Top 350 position of the most popular wargames on BoardGameGeek.

In a review of Mice and Mystics in Black Gate, Andrew Zimmerman Jones said "For someone who has been looking for a good entry-level roleplaying game for his oldest son, this definitely caught my eye."

== Film adaptation ==
In October 2018, DreamWorks Animation acquired the rights to the role-playing game for a feature film adaptation. Alexandre Aja, long-time horror film director, was set to direct and write the film's script along with David Leslie Johnson-McGoldrick. Vertigo Entertainment's Roy Lee and Jon Berg were also set to serve as producers.

== See also ==
- Redwall
