= Summoner Wars: Second Edition =

Board game

Summoner Wars (Second Edition)
- Designers: Colby Dauch
- Illustrators: Martin Abel
- Publishers: Plaid Hat Games
- Publication: 2021
- Players: 2
- Playing time: 40-60 minutes
- Website: www.plaidhatgames.com/board-games/summoner-wars/

Summoner Wars (Second Edition) is a tactical card game designed by Colby Dauch and Plaid Hat Games which iterates on the 2009 title of the same name. In Summoner Wars, players aim to eliminate the opponent's summoner using factions by moving units and deck building. It was physically published in 2021 and received generally positive reviews for its strategy, engagement, and accessibility. A digital version was also released.

== Gameplay ==
In Summoner Wars, players are summoners controlling an army that aims to lead the fictional planet of Itharia. They select one of several pre-built faction decks or create a custom deck via deckbuilding. Throughout the game, players summon common and champion units to advance, aiming to eliminate the opponent's summoner.

== Release ==
Summoner Wars was released in May 2021. A digital edition, Summoner Wars Online, was also later released.

=== Reception ===
Summoner Wars received generally positive reviews upon its release. A review from IGN praised its accessibility, strategy, and engagement, but criticised the game system and expansions required. Writing for Dicebreaker, Michael Whelan commended the unique factions, the new decks, components and art quality, stating that it was an "interesting tactical puzzle". Chad Wilkinson from Tabletop Magazine also commented on the "incredibly smart spatial element" of combat. James Austin from The New York Times praised the tactics, accessibility, ease of setup, variety of factions, and the tightness of movement due to the "remarkably cramped size of the grid", but criticised the components.
