= Final Fantasy XIV: Endwalker =

2021 Final Fantasy XIV expansion pack

- Collector's edition cover art by Yoshitaka Amano depicting Hydaelyn (top) and Zodiark (bottom)
- Developer: Square Enix Creative Business Unit III (Note: now Square Enix Creative Studio III)
- Publisher: Square Enix
- Director: Naoki Yoshida
- Producer: Naoki Yoshida
- Designers: Kei Sato; Mitsutoshi Gondai; Yuichi Murasawa
- Programmer: Kiyotaka Akaza
- Artists: Shinya Ichida; Yusuke Mogi; Ayumi Namae
- Writers: Natsuko Ishikawa; Banri Oda
- Composer: Masayoshi Soken
- Series: Final Fantasy
- Platforms: macOS; PlayStation 4; PlayStation 5; Windows; Xbox Series X/S (Note: Since March 2024); Nintendo Switch 2 (Note: Since August 2026)
- Release: December 7, 2021
- Genre: MMORPG
- Mode: Multiplayer

Final Fantasy XIV: Endwalker (Note: In Japanese: ファイナルファンタジーXIV: 暁月の終焉(フィナーレ) (Hepburn: Fainaru Fantajī Fōtīn: Gyōgetsu no Fināre; lit. Final Fantasy XIV: Dawn Moon Finale)) is the fourth expansion pack to Final Fantasy XIV, a massively multiplayer online role-playing game (MMORPG) developed and published by Square Enix for macOS, PlayStation 4, PlayStation 5, and Windows, then later on Xbox Series X/S and Nintendo Switch 2. It was released on December 7, 2021, over two years after Shadowbringers, the previous expansion, with its production delayed by the COVID-19 pandemic. Like its predecessors, Naoki Yoshida served as director and producer and Masayoshi Soken composed the soundtrack. The expansion pack was released as a standalone product for current players; for new players, the "Complete Edition" that originally launched with Heavensward was updated to include all expansions including Endwalker.

Endwalker is the finale of the Hydaelyn-Zodiark arc, a story that began with the release of A Realm Reborn. Players travel the world, space, and time to stop the team of Garlean crown prince Zenos and rogue Ascian Fandaniel from successfully resuming the Final Days, an apocalyptic event that threatens all of existence. In addition to new areas, the expansion increases the level cap to 90 and debuts the Sage and Reaper jobs, among other changes.

As with its predecessor, Shadowbringers, Endwalker received acclaim, particularly for its satisfying conclusion to the storyline begun in A Realm Reborn.

== Gameplay ==
The gameplay and quest structure of Endwalker largely matches that of the base game. As with many MMORPGs, players interact with each other in a persistent world that responds to their actions. Due to ongoing issues with numerical values, such as enemy health pools, growing large enough to threaten overflow errors, the launch of Endwalker included a numeric down-scaling, sometimes colloquially referred to by MMO players as a "stat squish". As part of this down-scaling, belts were removed and rendered useless as equipment. Two new jobs were introduced with Endwalker: Sage, a healer that uses magical objects called nouliths, inspired by Funnels from the Gundam franchise, to direct aetheric energy to create barriers and amplify offense abilities; and Reaper, a scythe-wielding, armored, melee fighter that calls on the aid of an avatar from the void for greater power. Many other jobs were given changes as well, including a complete rework of the Summoner job, a major update to the Monk job, and various new abilities for other jobs.

A player versus player (PvP) overhaul also debuted in Endwalker, with PvP abilities for all jobs being completely reworked to be more streamlined. A new "small-scale" PvP gamemode called Crystalline Conflict launched in the 6.1 update, and the "Feast" PvP gamemode was discontinued.

Estinien, a character who formally joined the player's allies in the lead-up to Endwalker, was added as an option for the Trust system that debuted in Shadowbringers, which allows players to run four-player dungeons with three NPCs. Later updates added the ability to use the trust system in A Realm Reborn, Heavensward, and Stormblood dungeons as well, to allow all of the Main Story Quest to be almost fully a single player experience. Further new content after launch includes Myths of the Realm, a 24-player raid series that explores myths and legends surrounding the twelve deities worshiped by the people of Eorzea, and Pandæmonium, an eight-player raid series focusing on a mysterious location connected to a past villain, Lahabrea. Similar to the changes in Shadowbringers, some Main Story quests have been changed, including removing the trial "Cape Westwind" and replacing it with a single-player instance, while shortening and streamlining the dungeons of "Castrum Meridianum" and "The Praetorium"; the latter has had its last sections—a chain of boss fights against the Ultima Weapon and Lahabrea—split into a different Trial and single player instance respectively.

Patch 6.2 of Endwalker debuted a new system, Island Sanctuary, a farming simulation mode where players can tend a garden on a deserted island, raise livestock, and interact with pets. Island Sanctuary's philosophy is "slow life" and is intended as a relaxing solo pursuit for players without the pressure of competition. Further changes were made to Main Story quests, including removing the trial "The Steps of Faith" and replacing it with a single-player instance, and changing the boss mechanics of several early dungeons. In patch 6.1, the existing player housing system added a new housing area in the city-state of Ishgard, called the Empyreum. A new lottery-based method of acquiring a house was implemented, alongside assigning a larger number of wards for player guilds, called Free Companies, to ameliorate player concerns about the availability issues with the current system. In patch 6.18, the World Visit system was expanded to allow players to travel to other data centers in their region. Data centers were also added for the Oceania region, allowing better connections for players in those locations who previously used data centers in Japan.

== Plot ==
=== Story ===
The main characters of Endwalker, clockwise from top: Venat, G'raha Tia, the Warrior of Light, Estinien, Alphinaud, Tataru, Urianger, Y'shtola, Zenos, and Thancred; Alisaie (center).

The player and the Scions board a ship en route to Old Sharlayan, the capital of the nation Sharlayan. The player speaks with a woman, who reveals herself as Hydaelyn and tries to assure them of her sincerity despite having concealed her nature as a primal. During their investigation into Sharlayan's history, Hydaelyn possesses Krile, gifting the player an "Elpis" flower that glows near strong emotion. The Scions learn from the gleaner Erenville that the Forum, Sharlayan's government, has made special effort to study the aetherial sea and accelerated their efforts to gather specimens and knowledge. The Forum arrests the Scions, threatening to banish them unless they end their investigation.

The player travels to Thavnair to seek its alchemists, who are developing an anti-tempering ward. They learn that the dragon Vrtra has ruled Thavnair for millennia, hiding behind a figurehead satrap. While testing a ward made from Vrtra's scales, the alchemist Nidhana is captured by Fandaniel, revealed to be the Allagan technologist Amon who placed a clone of himself inside the Crystal Tower after being recruited by Emet-Selch. Protected by the warding scales, the Scions rescue Nidhana and destroy the Tower.

Alongside a detachment of the Grand Companies, the Scions march the ruins of Garlemald to put an end to Fandaniel's plans. Belligerent Garlean holdouts initially rebuff their aid, but eventually accept. The Scions assault the Tower of Babil and defeat Anima, a primal created from the corpse of Emperor Varis that had tempered Garlemald. Despite its destruction, Anima gathers enough aether to weaken Zodiark's prison on the moon, and Fandaniel and Zenos travel there to finish the job. Fandaniel betrays Zenos, merging with Zodiark to fight the player. Although he is defeated, Fandaniel kills himself and Zodiark, restarting the Final Days.

The player meets a servant made by Hydaelyn called the Watcher, who explains the moon is an evacuation vessel to escape the Final Days. Hydaelyn created the rabbit-like Loporrits to prepare the moon for evacuating "Etheirys", the planet's Ancient name. Woefully ignorant of life on modern Etheirys, the Loporrits plans for evacuation are derailed, saying that the other shards' residents will die when the Source is destroyed. The player and their companions eventually persuade the Loporrits to consider other options.

In Thavnair, monsters resembling the first Final Days' horrors assault the citizens. The player learns these "Blasphemies" manifest from someone consumed by despair, erasing their souls. The satrap dies protecting Thavnair, forcing Vrtra to reveal himself. Meanwhile, the Forum officially announces the evacuation of the star.

The player goes to the First to consult the lingering essence of Elidibus regarding the Final Days. He names "Elpis" a place where new life concepts were safety tested by the Ancients. Recalling that he had seen the player in Elpis before the sundering, Elidibus consumes the last of his soul-energy to send the player back in time to seek Hermes, Fandaniel's identity before he took the seat. In Elpis, Emet-Selch, Hythlodaeus, and Venat, the previous Azem, agree to help the player stop the coming of the Final Days.

They seek out Hermes, who introduces them to his creation Meteion, a child-like being linked to a collection of clones called Meteia sent to distant planets to discover the meaning of life. Their thoughts are connected via dynamis, an energy linked to emotions. Finding every world dead or dying upon arrival, the clones conclude that life is meaningless and should end. Meteion departs to join her sisters at the universe's edge, where they will trigger the Final Days. Hermes covers Meteion's escape, bitter at his colleagues' casual anthropocentrism and wanting to test mankind's worthiness. He erases Emet-Selch, Hythlodaeus, and his own memories, but the player and Venat escape. Venat sends the player home, urging them to stop the Final Days, and sunders the world as Hydaelyn.

Returning to Sharlayan, Alphinaud secures the Forum's cooperation, and Fourchenault reconciles with his children. He leads the Scions to the Aitiascope, where they can physically enter the aetherial sea. After facing a shade of Amon and defeating him, the group reaches Hydaelyn. She greets them, revealing Her ages-long plan to stop the Final Days, but the Scions must prove they can defeat Her. The Scions emerge victorious, and Hydaelyn gifts the player some of her power and a crystal pointing to the Meteia's nest. Her purpose finally fulfilled, Hydaelyn fades from existence.

The Scions board the Forum's evacuation vessel, dubbed the Ragnarok. With the help of un-tempered Tribes and the Mothercrystal, a vast repository of aether gifted by Hydaelyn, the Scions reach the edge of the universe: Ultima Thule. There they find spectres of dead worlds visited by Meteion. One by one, the Scions sacrifice themselves so the others can proceed, until only the player remains. Confronting Meteion, the player uses Azem's crystal to temporarily revive Emet-Selch and Hythlodaeus, who create a field of Elpis flowers to radiate hope. The flowers resurrect the Scions, and restore Meteion to her former self, begging the group to stop her sisters.

The Meteia merge into the Endsinger, overpowering the group. The player teleports their comrades to safety and defeats her with Zenos' unexpected aid as Shinryu. Meteion views the player's memories and realizes that Hermes' question has no single answer, departing peacefully. Zenos confronts the player, claiming their conflict is what gives his life meaning, and insinuating that the player feels the same. (Note: The Warrior can confirm this, deny it, or ignore the question.) Zenos dies after a final fight with the player, (Note: Speaking in an interview, director Naoki Yoshida confirmed that Zenos died permanently in Ultima Thule. Link: https://www.fanbyte.com/games/news/ffxiv-zenos-story-needs-no-further-embellishment/) who is teleported away and narrowly revived while returning home. Having averted the Final Days and brought peace to the star, the Scions formally disband, but secretly remain connected should the need arise.

=== Patches ===
Inspired by Emet-Selch, the player helps Estinien hunt for a legendary undersea vault near Thavnair, joined by Y'shtola, G'raha, and Urianger. They find it, discovering it is Vrtra's emergency fund. Estinien prompts him to use it for reconstruction and an orphanage. It also houses a fissure to the Void, the thirteenth shard. Vrtra once sought to expand it, to seek his beloved sister, Azdaja. She had flown through an Allagan voidgate to end the voidsent invasion of Meracydia. Vrtra long ago gave up searching, but the Scions rekindle his hopes. Meanwhile, an armored figure plots to invade the Source.

The alchemists build a new, adult-sized avatar for Vrtra to explore the Void. Seeking Azdaja's whereabouts, the party explores a castle in the Void and defeat Scarmiglione, archfiend of earth. They meet Zenos' former Reaper avatar, revealed by the light of Hydaelyn's final crystal to be a half-voidsent woman. In exchange for payment in aether, she shares her story: she was exposed to Darkness in the womb, during a war called the Contramemoria. Y'shtola names her "Zero", as a new beginning, not nothingness. A revived Scarmiglione surprises them, revealing that death is impossible on the Thirteenth. Y'shtola realizes overabundant Darkness prevents souls from travelling to the aetherial sea. The Scions permanently defeat Scarmiglione using Zero's crystallizing power, called "memoria".

The Echo reveals Azdaja was caught by Golbez, the armored figure, and may yet live. Meanwhile, Golbez learns of Scarmiglione's defeat, and dispatches Barbariccia, the archfiend of wind. The player defeats Barbariccia, and Zero crystallizes her, but collapses from over-exertion. Forced to fall back to the Source, the Scions bring Zero so she can recuperate.

Zero recovers on the Source, and offers a legend about the Thirteenth as payment. The world was at peace until the Ascians taught them the summoning of primals, called "Eidolons". Memoriates, like Zero and her mother, defeated them, temporarily restoring peace. Unfortunately, Darkness leaked from the memoria, corrupting them, so they turned on each other: the Contramemoria War. The chaos triggered a Flood of Darkness, erasing the land and corrupting all life into voidsent. To Zero's surprise, the Scions pledge to restore her world.

While the Scions prepare to return, Vrtra feels Azdaja's presence on the Source, in Garlemald. They reunite with Alphinaud and Alisaie, learning a voidsent horde amasses at an abandoned mountainous Reaper village, which they reach with the aid of Garlean engineers. They slay Cagnazzo, archfiend of water, and discover Cagnazzo drew them over by using Azdaja's eye to open a voidgate. The Scions retrieve the depleted eye, hoping it will help them find her.

Returning to Thavnair, the group discovers that Cagnazzo was a distraction to allow Rubicante, the archfiend of fire, to enter the Source and destroy the voidgate at Alzadaal's Legacy. The player defeats Rubicante, who reveals to them in an Echo vision that Golbez learned of the Ascians' machinations and the other shards, and seeks to invade the Source so that the voidsent may return to the aetherial sea. As Rubicante dies, he directs the player to the Thirteenth's moon. The Scions realize that Golbez's plans to shatter the barrier between the Source and the Thirteenth would produce chaos comparable to a calamity, and look for another way to travel there.

The Scions plan to harness Zodiark's lingering aether on the moon to create a voidgate to the Thirteenth's moon. Once there, they reunite Vrtra with his sister. This rekindles Azdaja's hopes, but also allows Golbez to transform her into a voidsent. The player battles Golbez and Azdaja, defeating them, but fails to stop Golbez from fusing Azdaja with Zodiark's lingering aether on the Thirteenth's moon, creating an extremely powerful voidsent named "Zeromus". Zero is unable to crystallize Zeromus, forcing all to flee with Vrtra. With Zero, the player goes to the First and enlists Ryne's aid in using the First's light to counter Zeromus' darkness.

After Zero absorbs enough light, the Scions and Vrtra return to Golbez's domain. Golbez reveals his past: born Durante, he took up Golbez's name after being forced to kill his corrupted friend. In his despair, the Ascian Igeyorhm manipulated Golbez into killing the Thirteenth's Watcher and unleashing the Flood of Darkness. Zero convinces Golbez to stand down and save their world without sacrificing another. With Golbez's aid, the player defeats Zeromus and saves Azdaja; Vrtra sacrifices one of his eyes to grant her a new vessel. In the aftermath, Zeromus' darkness is given to Ryne in the hopes it can fully restore the First, while Zero and Golbez stay on the Thirteenth to restore balance. Sometime later, Wuk Lamat, the daughter of Tural's leader, arrives in Sharlayan to petition the player's aid in a rite of succession for Tuliyollal's throne along with Krile, Erenville, Alphinaud and Alisaie. Meanwhile, Thancred and Urianger are hired by another claimant to the throne, while Estinien journeys to Tural alone.

== Development ==
Planning for expansions like Endwalker began shortly prior to the release of the preceding expansion with a "scriptwriting retreat" involving producer and director Naoki Yoshida and the main scenario writers, Natsuko Ishikawa and Banri Oda. The story was largely finalized by October 2019. The process for developing an expansion involves laying out the progression from main game to expansion in detail and categorizing these elements so that developers would not get confused between patch content and expansion content which were being created simultaneously. Expansions for Final Fantasy XIV are designed to compete with offline RPGs in length and content. In terms of content, roughly 70% of development time is devoted to standard features common to every expansion, such as new dungeons and classes, and 30% is devoted to creating unique features and modes of gameplay. Development for the PlayStation 5 version of the game was part of the latter 30%. This version takes advantage of the console's larger internal memory to improve load times and includes higher quality graphics, DualSense controller rumble support, and improved audio. With the completion of the PlayStation 5 version, an Xbox version entered active development.

Development of Endwalker was delayed by the COVID-19 pandemic. Square Enix moved to remote work in April 2020 due to the state of emergency declared in Tokyo. One major obstacle was the inability to connect to internal servers remotely for bug testing. The quality assurance team reconfigured the office to adhere to social distancing guidelines. Development was back at 90% efficiency by June. Endwalker was originally planned for a Q3 2021 release but was ultimately delayed to Q4 2021.

Expansions for Final Fantasy XIV are traditionally announced at Fan Festival, a biennial convention that takes place in Japan, North America, and Europe, but these events were cancelled due to the COVID-19 pandemic. In their place, Square Enix announced the expansion at an online showcase in February 2021 and released additional information at a digital "Fan Festival Around the World" in May. The latter encompassed livestreams of concerts and panel interviews with developers as well as in-game events. Yoshida chose the timing of the digital Fan Festival to fall in between the two story-based updates in Patch 5.5 of Shadowbringers to encourage speculation about the plot of Endwalker.

Yoshida described the story for Endwalker as the conclusion to the "Hydaelyn–Zodiark arc" that began with A Realm Reborn in 2013. The decision to conclude the long-running arc came about after the success of 2017's Stormblood expansion secured greater funding for the title as a whole. Unlike previous expansions where the main story continues in content added in patches, the primary conflict of Endwalker was resolved within the expansion itself and the patch content debuted a new story arc. The development team has a preliminary road map for at least five years of content beyond Endwalker.

Shadowbringers introduced Viera and Hrothgar as playable races to the game, but due to time and resource constraints, only one gender of each was made available at the time. Endwalker debuted with male Viera, while female Hrothgar will become available at a later date. The development team was able to implement these additions using 30% time to address the tremendous desire for them. The team has also included more hairstyle options for both Viera and Hrothgar, as well as more to come in the future.

=== Patch history ===
Patches and expansions
Patch	Title	Release date	Notes
6.0	Endwalker	December 7, 2021	The Pandæmonium: Asphodelos raids debuted two weeks post-launch with a Savage difficulty mode releasing two weeks after. In this storyline, the player joins Themis, Elidibus' past self, and Lahabrea's estranged son Ericthonios, in their investigation of a facility in Elpis called Pandæmonium. The player defeats escaped beasts along with the keyward Hesperos within Asphodelos.
6.1	"Newfound Adventure"	April 12, 2022	This patch includes Aglaia, a 24-man "alliance raid". It is the first part of the Myths of the Realm storyline, in which the patron deities of Eorzea, known as the Twelve, challenge the player to friendly combat. Additional features include an Extreme trial against the Endsinger; the fourth Ultimate raid, Dragonsong's Reprise; Arkasodara allied society quests; and player travel between data centers.
6.2	"Buried Memory"	August 23, 2022	"Buried Memory" introduced Island Sanctuary, Variant and Criterion Dungeons, Omicron allied society quests, and the Manderville Weapon series. In Abyssos, the second part of the Pandæmonium raid series, the player defeats Hephaistos, a splintered fragment of Lahabrea seeking to resurrect his wife Athena.
6.3	"Gods Revel, Lands Tremble"	January 10, 2023	Features include a new Deep Dungeon titled Eureka Orthos; the fifth Ultimate raid, The Omega Protocol; the continuation of the Manderville Weapon series; and Loporrit allied society quests. In Euphrosyne, the second part of the Myths of the Realm raid series, the player continues sparring with and seeking answers from the Twelve.
6.4	"The Dark Throne"	May 23, 2023	In Pandæmonium: Anabaseios, the player investigates Pandæmonium's appearance in the present day, defeating the shade of Themis and the resurrected Athena, thwarting her plans for godhood. Other features include an update to the Blue Mage job, a new route for Ocean Fishing in the Far East, and the second Variant and Criterion Dungeon, Mount Rokkon.
6.5	"Growing Light"	October 3, 2023	Releasing in two parts, this patch concludes the post-Endwalker storyline and sets the stage for Dawntrail. In Thaleia, the final raid in Myths of the Realm, the player defeats the Twelve, who return to the star believing that mankind are now the rightful heritors of the planet. "Growing Light" includes the third Variant and Criterion Dungeon, Aloalo Island, and collaboration events with Fall Guys and Final Fantasy XVI. During this patch, the free trial was expanded to include Stormblood, and the game's Xbox Series X/S version launched after an open beta.

=== Music ===
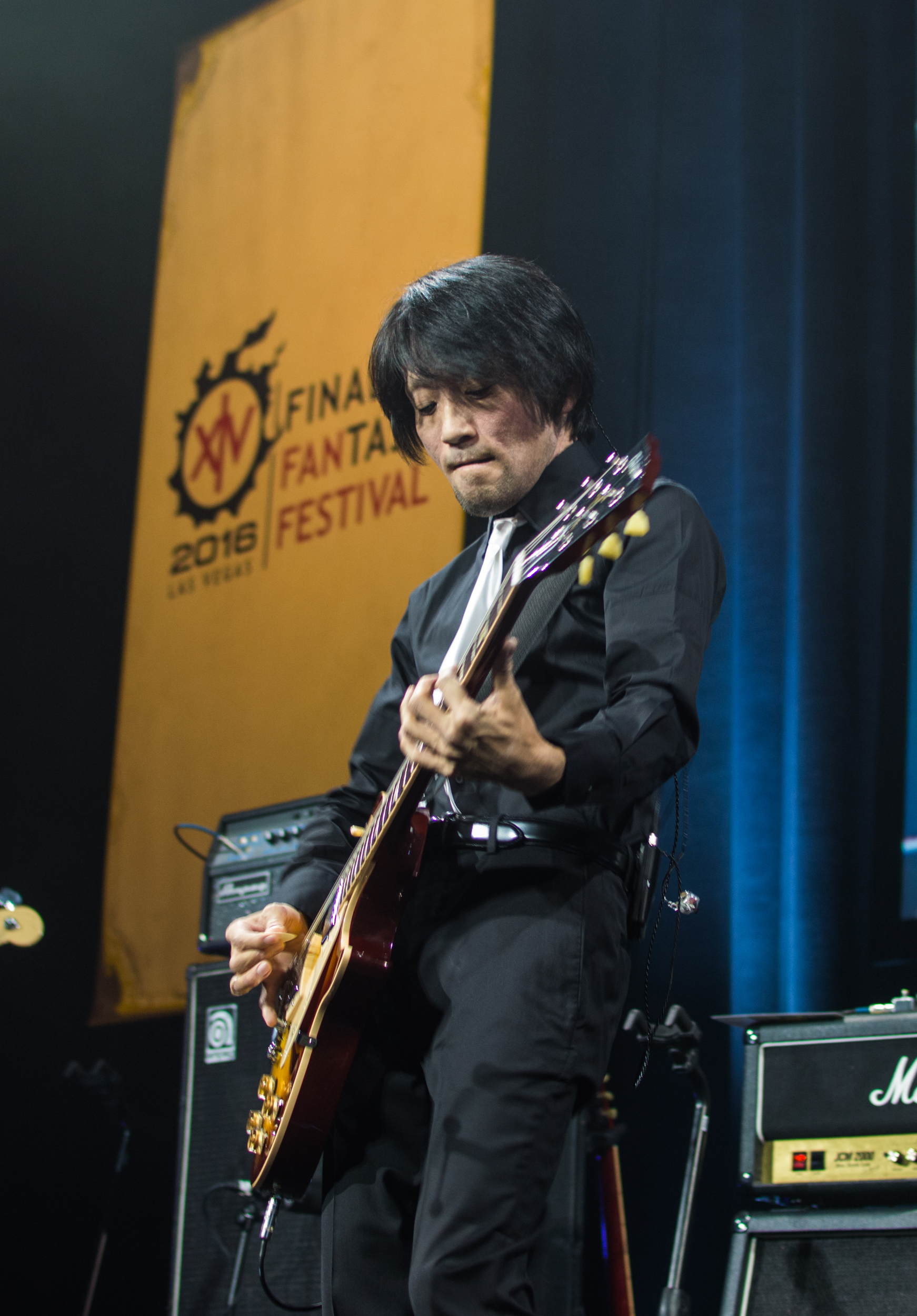
Masayoshi Soken composed the soundtrack to Endwalker.

Masayoshi Soken composed the majority of the expansion's score in addition to his duties as sound director. Due to his health issues, Nobuo Uematsu was asked to prioritize his other projects and did not contribute to the soundtrack. At Fan Festival 2021, Soken revealed that he had been in treatment for cancer since March 2020 and had hidden his diagnosis from most of the development team. With Yoshida's support, he arranged for materials to be brought to his hospital so he could compose while in treatment. He credited his recovery to composing as if "nothing had changed", which gave him something to live for. As of May 2021, he is almost in full remission and his doctor cleared him to perform at Fan Festival. The main theme of the game, "Footfalls", incorporates elements from grunge and shoegaze. It also quotes musical phrases and lyrics from each of the previous expansions' main themes to highlight Endwalker's status as the conclusion of a long-running story arc. Sam Carter of Architects provided the main vocals with Amanda Achen, who had performed on Shadowbringers, on background vocals.

The same year in December, musician Sia covered "Fly Me to the Moon" as a tie-in promotion for the expansion.

== Reception ==
Reception

Aggregate score
Aggregator	Score
Metacritic	PC: 92/100; PS5: 90/100

Review scores
Publication	Score
Destructoid	9/10
GameSpot	8/10
GamesRadar+	4.5/5
Hardcore Gamer	4.5/5
IGN	9/10
Jeuxvideo.com	18/20
PC Gamer (US)	89/100
PCGamesN	9/10

Endwalker received "universal acclaim" for the PC and PlayStation 5 version according to review aggregator Metacritic.

Chris Carter of Destructoid praised the title for being a "joy to progress through from start to finish", lauding the lack of boring fetch quests and the quality of life improvements. GameSpot noted the game's excellent dungeon and trial designs and its earnest storytelling while criticizing the plot's pacing issues for feeling too rushed and bloated at the same time. GamesRadar+ called the expansion a "landmark achievement in narrative development" and cited it as cementing Final Fantasy XIV as "one of the best Final Fantasy games ever made". Leif Johnson of IGN praised the title's ability to deliver enriching content despite its aging resources, writing: "Packed with hours of meaningful cutscenes and unforgettable new zones, Endwalker marks a satisfying conclusion to Final Fantasy XIV's story as it has existed to date". PC Gamer called the two new added jobs "terrific fun" and the narrative both "ambitious" and "messy", saying that the expansion "represent[ed] FF14's development team at their peak".

=== Accolades ===
In 2022, the Academy of Interactive Arts & Sciences awarded Endwalker with Role-Playing Game of the Year at the 25th Annual D.I.C.E. Awards; at the following year's awards ceremony, it won Online Game of the Year. The expansion was also the recipient of an "Award for Excellence" at the 2022 Japan Game Awards.
