= Plaid Hat Games =

Game publisher

- Type: Subsidiary
- Industry: Board games
- Founded: 2009; 17 years ago
- Founder: Colby Dauch
- Products: Board games
- Parent: F2Z Entertainment (2015); Asmodee (2015–2020)
- Website: Official website

Plaid Hat Games is a United States–based board game studio. Plaid Hat Games was founded in 2009. Board game designer Colby Dauch formed the board game publishing company in order to release the company's first game, Summoner Wars.

In 2015, Plaid Hat Games was acquired by Canadian game publisher F2Z Entertainment. From 2015 to 2020, Plaid Hat Games operated independently as a design and development studio. F2Z USA Corp manages the business logistics, sales, and marketing of all games released by the game publisher. Due to Plaid Hat Games' integration into F2Z Entertainment, every future Plaid Hat Games board game starting in 2016 is to be simultaneously released by French board game publisher Filosofia.

On February 19, 2020, head of studio and founder Colby Dauch reached an agreement with Asmodee Group to reacquire the independent rights to the studio and its brand, as well as publication rights to some of their games.

== Games published ==
Plaid Hat Games has released the following games:

- Summoner Wars, 2009
- Dungeon Run, 2011
- Mice and Mystics, 2012
- BioShock Infinite, 2013
- City of Remnants, 2013
- Dead of Winter: A Cross Roads Game, 2014
- Mice and Mystics: Downwood Tales Expansion, 2014
- Ashes: Rise of the Phoenixborn, 2015
- Specter Ops, 2015
- Tail Feathers, 2015
- SeaFall, 2016
- Stuffed Fables, 2018
- Abomination: The Heir of Frankenstein, 2019
- Forgotten Waters, 2020
- Summoner Wars (Second Edition), 2021
- Familiar Tales, 2022
- Hickory Dickory, 2023
- Freelancers: A Crossroads Game, 2023
- Wandering Galaxy: A Crossroads Game, 2024 (crowdfunded)

== Awards and honors ==
Summoner Wars

- 2009 Best New Game Designer, Dice Tower
- 2009 Best Small Publisher, Dice Tower

Dead of Winter: A Cross Roads Game

- 2014 Best Innovative Game, Golden Geek Award
- 2014 Best Thematic Game, Golden Geek Award
- 2014 Best Game Artwork and Presentation Nominee, Golden Geek Award

Summoner Wars (Second Edition)

- 2021 Best 2-Player Board Game Nominee, Golden Geek Award
