= Final Fantasy XIV: Stormblood =

2017 Final Fantasy XIV expansion pack

- Collector's edition cover art depicting Lyse
- Developer: Square Enix Business Division 5 (Note: now Square Enix Creative Studio III)
- Publisher: Square Enix
- Director: Naoki Yoshida
- Producer: Naoki Yoshida
- Designers: Nobuaki Komoto; Kei Sato
- Programmer: Kiyotaka Akaza
- Artists: Hiroshi Minagawa; Takeo Suzuki; Shinya Ichida; Yusuke Mogi
- Writers: Natsuko Ishikawa; Banri Oda; Daichi Hiroi; Yuki Kimura
- Composer: Masayoshi Soken
- Series: Final Fantasy
- Platforms: macOS; PlayStation 4; Windows; PlayStation 5 (Note: Since May 2021); Xbox Series X/S (Note: Since March 2024); Nintendo Switch 2 (Note: Since August 2026)
- Release: June 20, 2017
- Genre: MMORPG
- Mode: Multiplayer

Final Fantasy XIV: Stormblood (Note: In Japanese: ファイナルファンタジーXIV: 紅蓮の解放者(リベレーター) (Hepburn: Fainaru Fantajī Fōtīn: Guren no Riberētā; lit. Final Fantasy XIV: Crimson Lotus Liberator)) is the second expansion pack to Final Fantasy XIV: A Realm Reborn, a massively multiplayer online role-playing game (MMORPG) developed and published by Square Enix for macOS, PlayStation 4, and Windows, then later on PlayStation 5, Xbox Series X/S, and Nintendo Switch 2. It was released on June 20, 2017, just under two years after Heavensward, the previous expansion. Like for its predecessor, Naoki Yoshida served as director and producer and Masayoshi Soken composed the soundtrack, with Nobuo Uematsu contributing the theme song. The expansion pack was released as a standalone product for current players; for new players, the "Complete Edition" of Final Fantasy XIV that originally launched with Heavensward was updated to include both expansions. In order to make necessary engine improvements, service for the PlayStation 3 game client was terminated with the expansion's early access period. A special upgrade campaign allowed affected players to obtain the PlayStation 4 version for free.

Stormblood marks a shift in the ongoing conflict with the Garlean Empire. Players lead rebellions in the imperial provinces of Ala Mhigo, an Eorzean city-state conquered twenty years ago, and Doma, a Far Eastern nation with a proud ninja tradition. These regions are administered by the emperor's son, Zenos yae Galvus, whose brutal oppression of the conquered imperial subjects impels the player to act. Traveling these diverse lands, players join forces with the Ala Mhigan Resistance and the deposed Crown Prince of Doma. In addition to adding new areas, the expansion pack increases the level cap, adds two new character classes, revamps the battle system for existing combat classes, and introduces swimming gameplay.

Stormblood was well received upon release and earned nominations for "Expansion of the Year". By August 2017, the title had reached a cumulative total of 10 million accounts. As with its predecessors, major content patches were scheduled for every three months. The first one—"The Legend Returns"—was released on October 10, and premieres a storyline written by Yasumi Matsuno that features his signature Ivalice setting, as well as a special "Ultimate" difficulty battle, designed to be the most challenging content in the game.

== Gameplay ==
A dramatic overhaul of the battle system accompanies the level cap increase to level 70.

The gameplay and quest structure of Stormblood largely match that of its base game. As with many MMORPGs, players interact with each other in a persistent world that responds to their actions. A dramatic overhaul of the battle system accompanies the level cap increase to level 70. The changes fall into three broad categories. First, battle abilities were redesigned to eliminate redundant actions and improve the flow of combat. Second, a new set of "role actions" ensures that all players can access critical abilities to their role—tank, healer, or damage dealer. Finally, all classes gained a "Job Gauge" that displays all class-relevant information in a more visually distinct way. Two new job classes were introduced as well—the katana-wielding Samurai and the versatile Red Mage, both damage-dealing classes. These jobs begin at level 50 with their own storylines connected to the new settings. Unlike Heavensward, they are accessible to any player with a level 50 class, regardless of story progress.

Stormblood introduces a new player versus player (PvP) mode called Rival Wings. Two teams of 24 players face off in goblin-run war games. Points are earned by destroying opposing bases and robot minions. Players are able to call down and pilot giant mecha after achieving certain objectives. The mode has been compared to multiplayer online battle arena (MOBA) games.

In addition to the already-existing normal and Savage difficulty raids, Stormblood adds a third "Ultimate" difficulty that is structured as a single encounter comprised of multiple bosses, which are unlocked by clearing an associated Savage raid tier. These encounters must be cleared in a single attempt with no checkpoints in between bosses, otherwise the party will be sent back to the beginning of the encounter. Players who clear Ultimate raids are rewarded with a single totem they can exchange for a weapon of their choice themed around the raid they cleared. While the weapons are marginally stronger than those obtained from the Savage raid required to unlock the Ultimate raid, they fall outside of standard gear progression and are instead for those seeking a greater challenge. Unlike other raids in the game that can be run "unsynced" with level caps unlocked, Ultimate raids can only be run at the character level and item level caps they were released at, ensuring that their difficulty is largely preserved even as new expansions and patches continue to be released and players get stronger gear from them. With the addition of Stormblood into the Free Trial and Starter Edition of the game in patch 6.5, Free Trial players are barred from participating in Ultimate raids even if they meet the participation requirements, as this would require them to use in-game resources normally unavailable to them.

Finally, a new area called "The Forbidden Land, Eureka" debuted with Patch 4.2. Its gameplay is inspired by "old school" MMORPGs, including Final Fantasy XI and others. In Eureka, players must use an elemental wheel to exploit monsters' weaknesses and increase their own Elemental level. Unlike the rest of the game, players lose experience points if defeated and can even "Level Down". Later sections of Eureka permit the use of Logos Actions, which are unique spells and abilities that players craft using materials found in the zone. Eureka culminates in a high tier raid called the Baldesion Arsenal that challenges 56 players to work together to overcome it.

== Plot ==
=== Setting and characters ===
The main characters of Stormblood, clockwise from top: Lyse, Fordola, Yotsuyu, the Warrior of Light, Raubahn, Yugiri, Gosetsu, Zenos, and Hien.

Stormblood occurs on three main continents of Hydaelyn, a fictional planet with diverse Earth-like climates, focused on the Garlean imperial provinces of Ala Mhigo and Doma. The Empire seeks to eliminate "primals" - summoned beings shaped like deities which deplete the land of life - but chooses brutal expansionism and religious persecution to stop summons. Found at the eastern edge of Eorzea, the focus region of previous expansions, the city-state of Ala Mhigo rules over the arid Gyr Abania region. Its land bridge to the other continents acts as a buffer state to Eorzea. Twenty years before Stormblood, the Empire conquered Ala Mhigo in the wake of a popular uprising against the monarchy. Gaius van Baelsar, the legatus leading the invasion, had intended to conquer all of Eorzea, but stalled in the face of Eorzean and dragon resistance. He instead builds Baelsar's Wall at the Ala Mhigan border, waiting for an opportunity. Further, he established the Crania Lupi ("Wolves' Skulls"), a native Ala Mhigan irregular unit offering citizenship for service. After Gaius' defeat in A Realm Reborn, the new Emperor Varis zos Galvus made his son, Zenos yae Galvus, imperial viceroy. Zenos' harsh and sadistic tyranny contrasts with Gaius' egalitarian, meritocratic policies, and he whiles away his time seeking worthy opponents for lethal combat.

Doma, in the far East, is a previous conquest of Zenos. Formerly a proud martial kingdom, Imperial occupation has sent rightful Prince Hien into hiding and broken the peoples' spirits. Leaving for Ala Mhigo, Zenos promotes Yotsuyu goe Brutus, a Doman turncoat who hates her countrymen, to acting viceroy. Doma takes inspiration from the cultures of ancient China and Japan. The Azim Steppe, north of Doma, houses numerous nomadic Au Ra tribes, who hold an annual Naadam as their leadership competition, based on the Mongolian Naadam festival. Hingashi, an isolationist island nation, lies eastward across the Ruby Sea. Only the port city Kugane lies open to foreign trade, with Hingashi proper off-limits, acting as pastiches of Edo-era Japan and Nagasaki, respectively. In the Ruby Sea reside turtle-like Kojin tribes, and the Confederacy, a loose pirate coalition and protection racket. While Gridania, Ishgard, and Limsa Lominsa remain involved, of the Eorzean Alliance states, only Ul'dah plays a major role in Stormblood, due to Flame General Raubahn Aldynn being an Ala Mhigan refugee.

Immediately prior to Stormblood, an Ala Mhigan Resistance faction makes a false flag attack on Baelsar's Wall in Eorzean Alliance uniforms, hoping to restart the war. The player character, named the Warrior of Light for defeating Gaius, and their peacekeeping allies the Scions of the Seventh Dawn, arrive to restore order, but one Scion, Papalymo, sacrifices himself in the process. His travelling companion, an Ala Mhigan orphan named Lyse who had posed as her elder sister Yda, is inspired anew to throw off the Garlean occupation. The twins Alphinaud and Alisaie, and the Scions' coinkeeper Tataru, aid her. The Alliance ultimately captures the Wall and fortifies, expecting imperial retaliation. Meanwhile, Gosetsu, one of Hien's retainers, comes to recall Yugiri and able-bodied Doman refugees. The Alliance contacts the main Resistance force across the Wall, led by Conrad and his lieutenant M'naago, while Zenos moves to crush the rebellion, aided by the Skulls' commander, Fordola.

=== Story ===
Stormblood opens with sympathetic Alliance leaders hoping to aid Ala Mhigo. Raubahn dispatches the Warrior of Light, Lyse, and the Scions to meet the Ala Mhigan Resistance, seeking support for an Alliance incursion. Conrad, a major Resistance leader, gladly accepts their aid. However, Fordola rem Lupis, a Garlean loyalist, devastates the resistance headquarters in a surprise attack. Garlean Prince Zenos yae Galvus joins, easily outmatching even the Warrior. Unimpressed, he withdraws, leaving survivors to rebuild. Unable to confront the Garleans head-on, the Scions follow Alphinaud's suggestion to foment revolution in Doma, Zenos' other province headed by the cruel Yotsuyu goe Brutus, to divide the Imperials' forces.

The group sails for the Far East. In Kugane, they reunite with Gosetsu, crossing the Ruby Sea, aided by Blue Kojin traders. They also convince the Confederacy to drive out the Empire by breaking its contract with the Red Kojin mercenaries and defeating their primal, Susano. They find Yugiri in Doma, whom Prince Hien has asked to measure his peoples' will—if they desire freedom, he will return from exile to lead; if not, he will surrender himself to Garlemald to ease his people's suffering. When Zenos arrive in Doma for an inspection, the Warrior attempts to assassinate him but is again defeated. Zenos, intrigued, spares the Warrior, seeking a future, more intense conflict. Villagers previously rescued by Yugiri rally and drive off the Imperial retinue.

Inspired by their spirit, the Scions travel to the Azim Steppe seeking Hien. He lives among the Mol, who nursed him to health after a previous failed rebellion. Planning to win the upcoming Naadam for the Mol, he hopes to lead the Steppe's warriors to bolster the liberation army. After passing Steppe initiation trials, Hien and the Scions gain the Mol elder's blessing to participate. The Warrior secures victory for the Mol, and the Steppe's warriors eagerly join Hien's cause. Returning to Doma, Alphinaud presents Hien with a Far Eastern Alliance: the Confederacy, Doma, the Blue Kojin tribe, and now the Azim Steppe tribes. They assault Doma Castle, defeating Yotsuyu's forces. Defiant, she collapses the castle atop them, but Gosetsu holds the ceiling up for the others to escape; both he and Yotsuyu are presumed dead. Hien reclaims his kingdom and pledges to aid Ala Mhigo in kind.

On returning west, word spreads of Doma's freedom; numerous Imperial provinces go into open rebellion, stretching their forces thin. The Ala Mhigan diaspora and liberated labor-camp workers swell the Resistance's ranks. Raubahn and Conrad press the advantage, taking a key bridge on the route to the capital, opening access to Gyr Abania proper. The Warrior and Lyse also defeat the primal Lakshmi to clear the way. In the next battle, Fordola sends artillery fire against a Garlean watchtower on Zenos' orders, killing its defenders and mortally wounding Conrad. His last request makes Lyse leader of the Resistance.

The liberators push into the Lochs surrounding the capital, building a forward operating base. The Scions infiltrate a Garlean base and extract their comrade Krile, whom Garlean scientists had experimented on to replicate her Echo. Fordola has become their prototype "Resonant" and Zenos receives the perfected version. The Scions capture Fordola through trickery to fool this ability. With air support from Hien, the Alliance storms the capital. The Warrior faces Zenos a third time, finally overpowering him. Zenos retreats, unveiling the primal Shinryu, captured by Omega above Baelsar's Wall. Using his Resonant powers, Zenos fuses with Shinryu and battles the Warrior. Zenos and Nidhogg's eyes are ejected from Shinryu upon its death; Zenos commits suicide, completing Ala Mhigo's liberation, while Estinien later arrives and destroys the eyes. In post-credit scenes, Lyse amiably resigns from the Scions to focus on rebuilding Ala Mhigo; Emperor Varis (Zenos' father) is visited by Elidibus; and Gosetsu and Yotsuyu are revealed to have survived.

=== Patches ===
Lyse calls a constitutional conference of local and tribal leaders. One Ananta tribe summons their primal, Lakshmi, pushing Lyse to call on Fordola's Resonant resistance. Together, she and the Warrior defeat Lakshmi, and the conference begins drafting for a parliamentary republic. Meanwhile, sultana Nanamo pursues repatriation of Ala Mhigan refugees, via rebuilding the Saltery, producing jobs and valuable resources. With an emotional farewell, she persuades Raubahn to return to his homeland, promoting his son Pipin to Flame Marshal.

The Warrior and Yugiri find Gosetsu and a totally amnesiac Yotsuyu. Hien, heeding Gosetsu, commutes her sentence for mental incompetence. However, the arrival of her stepbrother and Garlean ambassador, Asahi sas Brutus, complicates matters. Claiming to represent the reformist Populares party, which opposes Garlean expansionism, Asahi suggests a prisoner exchange: Doman conscripts for Garlean prisoners of war, including Yotsuyu. His only demand is that Doma prevent any summonings in its territory. Hien readily agrees, but due to Yotsuyu's condition, denies her status as a Garlean citizen: if she regains her memories, she may join the exchange, otherwise she will remain. Asahi returns with the conscripts and his parents; the shock of seeing them rekindles Yotsuyu's childhood memories of abuse and being sold into prostitution. Armed by Asahi, she murders them and returns to him. He manipulates her into summoning the primal Tsukuyomi during the exchange, breaking the treaty as he intended. The Warrior defeats her, but as she dies, she avenges herself by killing Asahi as well.

Afterward, the Warrior learns Asahi acted on orders from Zenos, who has mysteriously survived his suicide, to discredit the Populares and promote the warmongering Optimates faction. The exchange completes under Maxima quo Priscus, Asahi's lieutenant and a loyal Populares member; he promises to carry Doma's peace treaty faithfully to the capital. Alphinaud joins him, hoping to survey Garlean politics. Zenos' personal guard downs their airship mid-flight, but a Garlean calling himself Shadowhunter rescues them. The other Scions seek Zenos' grave, finding it empty, and suspect an Ascian has possessed his corpse. Eorzean Alliance leaders meet in Ala Mhigo to invite it to join, and to debate their next move. A psychic disturbance afflicts the Scions, seeking to "throw wide the gates", leaving Thancred, and later Y'shtola and Urianger, comatose. In Garlemald, a revived Solus zos Galvus, in truth an Ascian, reminds his grandson Emperor Varis that Solus founded the Garlean Empire "solely to spread the seeds of chaos".

Maxima, and many Populares, defect to Ala Mhigo. Alphinaud has stayed with Shadowhunter to investigate Ascian activity, while the Empire mobilizes to retake Ala Mhigo. Meanwhile, Hien assembles a Far Eastern Alliance of Doma, local tribes, Steppe warriors, the Confederacy, and nearby provincial rebels. They re-purpose ancient Allagan technology, erecting a massive energy barrier against Garlean air attack, which blocks the Shadowhunter's vessel. He brings Alphinaud, who has also fallen comatose. The Warrior identifies the Shadowhunter as Gaius Baelsar, who survived the destruction of the Ultima Weapon. He has discarded his title of "van", focusing only on slaying Ascians. He reveals the Emperor has begun producing the chemical weapon Black Rose and mobilized the provinces, under command of Elidibus possessing Zenos' body. Further, Lahabrea's death has left Elidibus and the mysterious Emet-Selch as the last Ascian leaders. Gaius departs for Garlemald, harrying Black Rose production; while Hien leaves for Ala Mhigo, joining the Warrior of Light and the Alliance leaders to parley with Varis before the ground invasion.

Varis reveals to the Alliance that the Ascians created the Empire to sow discord and bring Calamity, and explains that they seek to undo the planet's sundering; their Calamities merge Shards back into the Source. He offers an alliance: permit Calamities to continue, until the reunited souls of mankind are strong enough to fight the Ascians directly. Disgusted, the Alliance unanimously refuses, and battle commences. Alisaie falls comatose soon after the successful first engagement. The Warrior drives off Elidibus, but nearly succumbs to the disturbance, leaving a stalemate. The speaker gives instructions: seek a beacon at the Crystal Tower to avert a ruinous future. Meanwhile, the real Zenos, who had cheated death by using the Echo to switch bodies, sets out towards Garlemald to reclaim his body.

== Development ==
Planning for Stormblood began well over a year prior to its announcement with a "scriptwriting retreat" involving producer and director Naoki Yoshida and the main scenario writers. Full development began in October 2016 with the team size ultimately reaching over 250. The process for developing an expansion involves laying out the progression from main game to expansion in detail, and categorizing these elements so that developers would not get confused between patch content and expansion content which were being created simultaneously. Yoshida emphasized in his design philosophy that an expansion to a MMORPG should have as much content as the base game. Having explored the skies in the previous expansion, Heavensward, Yoshida made the seas a focus of this expansion and included swimming gameplay. For the setting, Yoshida felt that players would expect Ala Mhigo based on the direction of the story so the designers pushed to include an entirely new area to surprise them. The art team deliberately drew a contrast between two different types of Japanese aesthetic for Doma and Hingashi, rather than simply replicating the Edo Japan of the popular imagination. The expansion was announced at the Las Vegas segment of Final Fantasy XIV Fan Festival 2016, which took place in October of that year. Further details about the expansion were released at the Tokyo and Frankfurt events, including the release date, new jobs, locations, and raids.

"Story skip" and "level boost" items debuted with the launch of Stormblood. These were created in response to complaints about the long story questline that might be daunting and inhibiting to new players. Yoshida explained that they were deliberately priced to be as expensive as the game itself to discourage players from using them too freely, instead urging prospective players to experience the story from the beginning. The developers responded to criticism of the PvP system by dramatically overhauling it in Stormblood. All jobs gained dedicated PvP actions that are balanced separately from the rest of the game. The changes were aimed at paring down the number of actions to produce a smoother experience. They are also designed to support a potential PvP tournament scene, including the "Feast Regional Championship" series which was held as a part of Final Fantasy XIV Fan Festival 2018.

Yoshida brought on Yasumi Matsuno, director of Final Fantasy Tactics and other Ivalice games, as a guest collaborator to work on a series of large-scale raids for the expansion. Yoshida met Matsuno, an avid player of Final Fantasy XIV, at a work dinner and was surprised by his request to be allowed to write something for the game. Matsuno wrote the scenario for the "Return to Ivalice" raids, which involve uncovering the ruins of the ancient Ivalician civilization and exposing the truth about the Zodiac Brave Story, based on the fable of the same name in Final Fantasy Tactics. He made an effort to integrate the story into the existing XIV setting and ensure that players who were not familiar with previous games set in Ivalice could still enjoy it. When Matsuno saw how enthusiastic the development team was about the first part of Return to Ivalice, he felt compelled to expand the story and design for the later parts. Keita Amemiya, creator and character designer of Garo, was invited to contribute monster designs for these raids. In exchange, armor and weapons from Garo were added to the game as part of a collaboration event.

Stormblood also features collaboration events with Monster Hunter: World and Final Fantasy XV. The seeds of the former were planted during the development of A Realm Reborn in 2011. When Yoshida took the job as producer and director of the redevelopment efforts, his friend and Monster Hunter series producer Ryozo Tsujimoto tried to warn him away from the project, fearing for his career trajectory. When Yoshida persisted, Tsujimoto offered assistance from Capcom and Monster Hunter to promote the game. Yoshida declined this as well, wanting Final Fantasy XIV to succeed on its own merits. Remembering this gesture, Yoshida and Tsujimoto reconvened during the development of Monster Hunter: World to finally make good on the latter's suggestion with the goal of celebrating Monster Hunter's newfound global audience. The collaboration consists of a boss battle against Rathalos in Stormblood and a Behemoth hunt in Monster Hunter: World. The collaboration with Final Fantasy XV was also long in the making. In the run-up to its release in 2016, Final Fantasy XV director Hajime Tabata and Yoshida discussed working together but wanted to wait for the right time in their respective content schedules. In both games' events, players battle the other title's version of Garuda to win new outfits and mounts.

Support for PlayStation 3 (PS3) ended with the release of Stormblood. The change allowed developers to increase the speed of loading non-player characters, as the PS3 had limited input/output capacity, which in turn permitted faster travel speeds for mounts. A special upgrade campaign allowed affected PS3 players to obtain the PlayStation 4 version for free. Stormblood also updates the game for compatibility with PlayStation 4 Pro. Two modes are available, one focusing on framerate and game performance and the other focusing on graphical resolution. A companion app for mobile phones was released in August 2018. It allows players to chat with friends, schedule events, manage inventory, and sell items using the in-game Market Board.

=== Patch history ===
The development team schedules the release of a major update approximately every three months. Each of these free content patches includes a continuation of the main scenario as well as new raids, features, trials, and dungeons. Minor patches that come in between major updates focus on quality of life improvements. With Stormblood, Yoshida reallocated resources to facilitate the development of new types of content (e.g. Eureka, Ultimate raids) by reducing the number of dungeons added during odd-numbered patches. As with previous expansions, Square Enix released five major patches for Stormblood over the course of its two-year content cycle.

Patches and expansions
Patch	Title	Release date	Notes
4.0	Stormblood	June 20, 2017	The Omega: Deltascape raid debuted two weeks post-launch with a Savage difficulty mode released two weeks after. Aided by a cartoonish Chocobo called Alpha, the player is challenged by Omega, a biomechanical reality-altering alien, in a tournament of creatures it has fabricated by observing this new planet.
4.1	"The Legend Returns"	October 10, 2017	This patch begins the "Return to Ivalice" 24-player raid series. Players travel to the Royal City of Rabanastre in search of Jenomis, a Garlean playwright who has gone missing. This update also premieres the first "Ultimate" difficulty battle, called the Unending Coil of Bahamut. Other features include an Extreme trial against Shinryu, a new PvP mode called Rival Wings, the ability to challenge dungeons with AI-controlled Adventurer Squadrons, and player housing in Kugane.
4.2	"Rise of a New Sun"	January 30, 2018	In Omega: Sigmascape, the player challenges more of Omega's creations, including a mad clown named Kefka. In the trial series, Genbu, one of the Four Lords, employs the player to quell the raging energy of his fellow Lords so they have the strength to renew the seal of an ancient monster, starting with Byakko. The first area of Eureka, Anemos, debuted in this update, as well as a new map for the Feast PvP arena.
4.3	"Under the Moonlight"	May 22, 2018	This patch continues Return to Ivalice with the Ridorana Lighthouse, where players defeat the dragon Yiazmat. Doman Restoration sees players aiding in the country's reconstruction efforts. This update also introduces another Ultimate trial, The Weapon's Refrain; a venture into the next area of Eureka, Pagos; and a new 100-floor Deep Dungeon called Heaven-on-High. Finally, by popular demand, the "bunny suit" costume was made wearable by male characters.
4.4	"Prelude in Violet"	September 18, 2018	The Omega raids conclude in this patch with Omega: Alphascape, where the player defeats Omega. Other features include a new trial against Suzaku, one of the Four Lords, and a new area in Eureka, Pyros.
4.5	"Requiem for Heroes"	January 8, 2019	Released in multiple parts, this patch sets up the events of Shadowbringers. The Return to Ivalice storyline concludes with the Orbonne Monastery, where the player enlists the aid of the Dalmascan Resistance to locate and defeat an ancient evil known as Ultima, the High Seraph. The Four Lords storyline culminates in a battle against Seiryu, and the ancient seal is finally repaired. The Eureka series also wraps up in Hydatos with a raid on the Baldesion Arsenal. Other features of this update include a new "Limited" job, Blue Mage; a new map for Rival Wings, the Hidden Gorge; the ability to travel to other servers within a data center using the World Visit system; and the addition of mahjong as a minigame.

=== Music ===
Masayoshi Soken composed the majority of the expansion's score—over 100 tracks—in addition to his duties as sound director. Nobuo Uematsu composed two vocal tracks, "Stormblood" and "Revolutions"; the former is a collaboration with Soken and the latter serves as the main theme for the game. Susan Calloway returned as the featured vocalist. Soken used "militant advance and invasion" as the central idea to the soundtrack, contrasting between powerful military marches and "those on the receiving end" of this encroachment. An example of this is the Ala Mhigan national anthem, "The Measure of His Reach". It has two versions, the original and a version used under the Garlean occupation that has harsher sound and more violent lyrics. The main musical phrase of "Stormblood" reappears multiple times throughout the soundtrack with different instrumentation and stylings to match the context. Due to the setting, Soken incorporated Asian instruments into his orchestration and chose to pare down the number used in field tracks, such as the Yanxia theme which had only harp and kokyū. He is particularly proud of his work on Shinryu's and Tsukuyomi's primal boss battle themes, which include motifs from "Stormblood" and Yanxia's theme respectively. Each phase of the Tsukuyomi battle theme references a different aspect of Yotsuyu's life. This theme, "Wayward Daughter", received the most votes in a player poll to select the track list for a "Best of Final Fantasy XIV" compilation album.

Final Fantasy XIV: Stormblood Original Soundtrack collects music from the launch of the expansion pack to Patch 4.3, "Under the Moonlight". The album was released by Square Enix on July 4, 2018, on Blu-ray Disc and includes a code for an exclusive "Wind-up Tsukuyomi" in-game pet. The album earned praise from Harry Gill of Original Sound Version, who appreciated the increased budget and production values afforded with the new expansion. He singled out the Lakshmi battle music, "Beauty's Wicked Wiles", as his favorite primal theme in the entire game and felt the soundtrack overall was stronger than the previous expansion's. Though he felt "Revolutions" was weaker than previous vocal pieces, Greg Fisher of Video Game Music Online was impressed by Soken's ability to maintain a consistent quality over such a large and eclectic score.

== Reception ==
Reception

Aggregate scores
Aggregator	Score
Metacritic	PC: 87/100; PS4: 89/100
OpenCritic	92%

Review scores
Publication	Score
Destructoid	9/10
GameSpot	8/10
GamesRadar+	4/5
IGN	9.2/10
PC Gamer (US)	92/100
USgamer	4.5/5

Stormblood continued the positive trend set by Heavensward, with many reviewers calling the expansion even stronger than its predecessor. Reception of the expansion was "generally favorable" for both PC and PlayStation 4 versions, according to review aggregator website Metacritic, based on 21 and 15 reviews, respectively. Out of 39 reviews on OpenCritic, 92% recommended the game, with a top critic average score of 88. Stormblood sold 33,000 units across standard and Complete Edition versions in Japan in its first week, making it the best-selling video game of the week in that region. It exceeded the developers' expectations in terms of sales, critical response, and player numbers.

Praise for the story was common among reviews. Mike Williams of USgamer commended the game's restraint in unfolding the complexity of the narrative and increasing emotional investment into the characters, calling it a "slow burn". Mike Fahey of Kotaku thought the game did a good job of keeping a fast pace and maintaining the player's motivation. Simon Parkin of Eurogamer appreciated the influence Yasumi Matsuno had on the story's tone. Many reviewers singled out the game's themes about the nature of war and colonialism for particular praise. Others, including Williams and Sam Prell of GamesRadar+, noted that the excellent writing for the villains were a boon to the story.

Reaction to other aspects of the game's pacing was more mixed. Most critics agreed the new side quests were still lacking, although Fahey acknowledged their variety as an improvement on the previous expansion's. Because of this, Prell felt the balance of the level grind between story missions was off, a criticism also lodged by Leif Johnson of IGN and Steven Messner of PC Gamer. On the other hand, reviewers recommended players to avoid the paid "story skip" and "level boost" items in favor of playing the story for themselves.

Various aspects of the gameplay and battle system received near universal plaudits. Chris Carter of Destructoid described battle encounters as "stylish and engaging" and Prell and Messner were impressed by the Susano boss trial, the latter comparing it to Metal Gear Rising. The system-level changes to combat were also well-received, including the streamlining of role actions and job unlocking, the consolidation of underused stats, and the Job Gauge user interface. Another consistent feature of reviews was praise for the two new job classes, Red Mage and Samurai. Red Mage's interweaving of melee and ranged attacks earned a glowing response, Samurai was lauded for its combo system, and both were commended for providing unique gameplay experiences. Finally, Carter and Messner took time to extol the improvements to PvP, with Messner calling it "one of my favorite activities in Stormblood".

Reviewers applauded the artistic and environmental design of the expansion. Ginny Woo of GameSpot felt that the Asia-themed zones were "well-integrated" into the story. Johnson saw "new heights of creativity" in the wild plains of the Mongolia-inspired Azim Steppe. Carter noted that the 4K resolution mode on PlayStation 4 Pro was an impressive feature. Reception for the addition of swimming gameplay was less enthusiastic. Although Fahey found the underwater environments to be visually appealing, he concluded that it was "woefully underutilized", a sentiment echoed by Carter.

Overall, critics praised Stormblood as an improvement over Heavensward. Fahey observed that the game is "one of the few [MMORPGs] able to maintain a monthly subscription model". Carter concluded that the expansion followed the "same routine as the base game", but admitted "that routine is a winning one". During the 2017 awards cycle, the expansion won "Best MMO" from Game Informer, Bleeding Cool, and RPGamer. It was also Editor's Choice for "Best Post-Release Content" at PlayStation Blog. In the 2018 cycle, the game won "Best MMO" from Massively OP.
