= Cactuar =

Fictional species in the Final Fantasy video game series

- Final Fantasy race
- The Cactuar as depicted in Final Fantasy VII Remake.
- First appearance: Final Fantasy VI (1994)
- Created by: Tetsuya Nomura

The Cactuar, known in Japan as Sabotender (サボテンダー, Sabotendā; lit. Cactender) is a fictional species of plant-like beings from the Final Fantasy video game franchise owned by Square Enix. They are usually depicted as anthropomorphic cacti with haniwa-like faces in a running or dashing pose. One of the recurring elements of the series, it initially appeared as an enemy in Final Fantasy VI. By the 2010s, the Cactuar has attained widespread popularity with Final Fantasy fans, and is considered one of the established mascots of the long-running series alongside the Moogle and the Chocobo. While the Cactuar still appear as recurring enemies in modern titles, they are also depicted as summoned allies as well as friendly non-player characters.

== Development ==
According to Japanese video game artist, game designer and director at Square Enix Tetsuya Nomura, the concept of the Cactuar is based on a doodle he drew on a notebook when he was attending high school as a teenager. The design of the Cactuar's face resemble haniwa, a type of terracotta clay figure traditionally used for ritual and funerary purposes during the Kofun period in Japanese history.

Alexander O. Smith, who played a major role in the English localizations of games developed and published by Square and later Square Enix like Vagrant Story and Final Fantasy XII, helped re-write translations written by a Japanese native translator for one of the PlayStation Final Fantasy games in the 1990s. One of the notable errors he corrected prior to the game's release was the original in-game description for the Cactuar, which was translated from Japanese to English as "It ejaculates needles!".

For Final Fantasy XV, the developer team noted that they had to make careful considerations on how to deal with the inclusion of comical or cute characters in a game designed to be more realistic than its predecessors. The Cactuar's physical texture and the depiction of the inside of its mouth was emphasized by the designers to make it more realistic as a type of wildlife in the game's world.

== Characteristics ==
Cactuars are typically depicted having stiff arms and legs without hands or feet, three black dots on their faces (representing two eyes and an oblong mouth) and three yellow quills at the top of their heads. The Cactuar's silhouette has been said to resemble the Japanese 卍 symbol, pronounced as "manji", which is traditionally a holy and auspicious symbol in Japan, although in fact its legs point in a different angular direction than its arms, whereas in the Manji (or other swastikas) they all point either clockwise or counter-clockwise. Even in modern titles, they look and move in a puppet-like manner, balancing on one leg with the others bent at 90 degree angles. They are notoriously difficult to hit, and best known for their defensive attack, 1000 Needles (also called Blow Fish), which typically does exactly 1000 hit points of damage to an opponent, regardless of defenses. In other games, they possess an even more powerful 10,000 Needles attack. Many Cactuar variants have appeared in various games, such as the Gigantender, a large, bulky Cactuar that looks more like a typical cactus. The Cactuar is usually depicted in a head-on pose without their backside visible, but in Final Fantasy XV they have been noted as having a prominent rear end when photographed from the back.

In Final Fantasy XV there are three variants of the creature: the regular Cactuar, the Slactuar and the Gigantuar. The former two are regular enemies which are similar in appearance with a very low chance of spawning, and will attempt to run from the player characters when encountered. Gigantuar is found as part of an optional side quest in the game. All variants are difficult enemies in combat, but will yield a generous number of experience points and useful items when defeated.

== Appearances ==
In their first appearance in Final Fantasy VI, Cactuars (called "Cactrots" in American translation of the game) are found in a small desert west of the town of Maranda in the World of Ruin. Most attacks (physical or otherwise) completely miss it, even though it only has 4 hit points, making it difficult to kill without the use of special items. They have since appeared in nearly every game in the series, and are occasionally featured as summonable allies or friendly NPC's. In World of Final Fantasy, the main characters can travel by train which is operated by a character known as the Cactuar Conductor; in one scene of the game which is framed as comic relief, the Cactuar Conductor eludes game protagonist Reynn while taunting her.

A mod which cosmetically alters NPC's in Final Fantasy XV: Windows Edition into Cactuars was created and promoted by Square Enix as an example feature of full mod support for the game's PC version. Development manager Kenichi Shida indicated prior to the March 6, 2018 launch of Final Fantasy XV: Windows Edition that the developmental team intended to introduce variants of the mod which enable players to customize the skins of in-game characters into other creatures such as Chocobos and Moogles at a later date, along with the public release of the game's modding tool. A cosmetic skin for sword-type weapons called the "Cactbar" mod is also available for download along with the Cactuar suit mod.

Cactuars have also appeared in video game crossovers, such as Mario Hoops 3-on-3, Mario Sports Mix, and Dragon Quest X. As part of the Monster Hunter: World cross-over event with Final Fantasy XIV in 2018, Cactuars which appear in the battlefield could be used as environmental traps, and players may encounter cactuar cuttings or flowering cactuar cuttings.

Matthew Adler from IGN noted that the Cactuar has appeared in 49 Final Fantasy games and 16 non-Final Fantasy titles as of 2020.

== Promotion and merchandise ==
Like the Moogle and the Chocobo, the Cactuar has been subject to numerous licensed merchandise connected to the Final Fantasy theme, sometimes in collaboration with third parties such as Universal Studios Japan and Sony Interactive Entertainment for the 2017 video game Everybody's Golf. Examples of merchandise which feature the Cactuar as its iconography include caps, hooded jackets, stuffed toy key chains, Christmas-themed cakes, wedding confectionary, and so on. A Cactuar was featured as an inflatable Final Fantasy mascot decorating an officially sponsored float for the 2019 Sydney Gay and Lesbian Mardi Gras.

The Cactuar is included as an exclusive feature with special editions of the Final Fantasy VII Remake as a summoned ally, available via downloadable content.

== Cultural impact ==
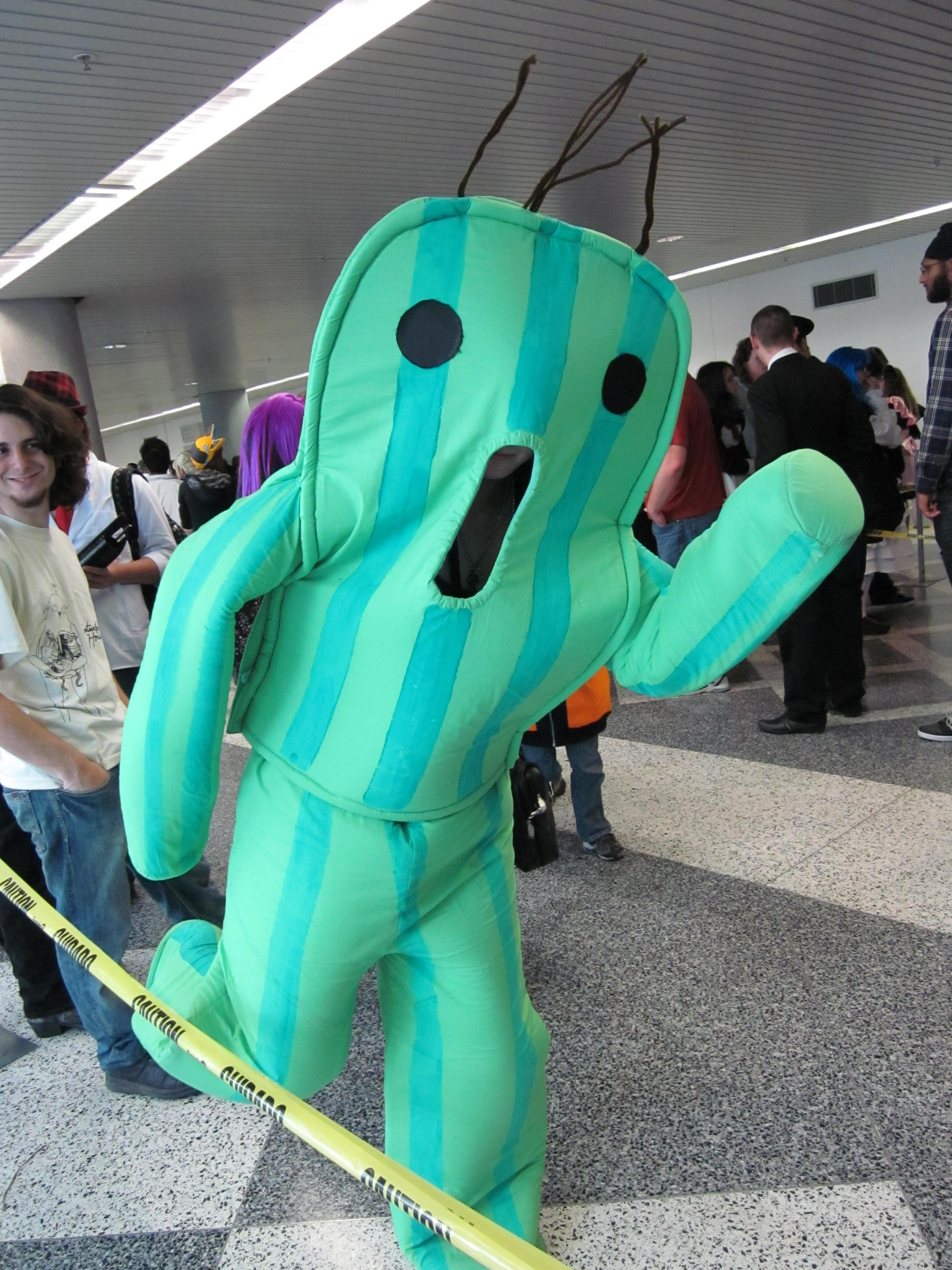
A cosplayer in a Cactuar costume.

The Cactuar has been well received, and often described as being an iconic element of the Final Fantasy franchise. Jason Wilson of VentureBeat called the Cactuar his favorite video game monster, saying that, while "kinda cute", they "can be scary [...] especially when these cowardly creatures stick around instead of running away and launch its devastating 1,000 Needles attack", also saying that they can easily cause a total party kill. James Stephanie Sterling called the Cactuar "everybody's favorite perennial mascot" in a 2009 post published by Destructoid, and praised its design for Final Fantasy XIII which was unchanged from previous iterations. Mike Fahey of Kotaku stated that the Cactuar is "one of Final Fantasy's most iconic creatures", and commented that the Final Fantasy XIV Gigatender was "doing the best it can to live up to that legacy, bless its giant plant heart", also stating that they "are adorable enough that I just want to sit in The Fields of Amber and watch them nearly topple all day long". GameFan called the Cactuar "one of the most popular Final Fantasy enemies of all time, despite its inability to talk", saying "his 1000 Needles attack can be quite painful if your characters don't have triple-digit hit points". In Darren Nakamura's review of World of Final Fantasy for Destructoid, he found the Cactuar Conductor's antics to be funny, as the context of the Cactuars being reputed as "slippery jerks" is well known to the series' fandom.

The Cactuar-themed mods for Final Fantasy XV: Windows Edition has received a varied reaction. Joe Donnelly from PC Gamer was excited by the mod and found the Cactuar costume to be cute. In a post which highlighted examples of players amusing themselves with Final Fantasy XV modded content, Brian Ashcraft from Kotaku featured the Cactuar mod as an example of the game's "delightful strange" mods. On the other hand, Alex Avard from GamesRadar felt that the Cactuar costumes are adorable but "slightly creepy", whereas Zoe Delahunty-Light also from GamesRadar considered the Cactbar mod to be "bizarre".

== See also ==
- Chocobo
- Moogle
