= Music of Final Fantasy XVI =

Music from the video game Final Fantasy XVI

The music for the 2023 video game Final Fantasy XVI, developed and published by Square Enix as the sixteenth mainline entry in the Final Fantasy series, was principally composed by Masayoshi Soken, with additional tracks by Takafumi Imamura, Daiki Ishikawa, Saya Yasaki, and Justin Frieden. The composers had previously worked on the soundtracks for Final Fantasy XIV and its expansions, developed by many of the same team as Final Fantasy XVI. The music was written principally in a classical style to match the game's dark tone, making recurring series themes such as the "Prelude" and "Chocobo" themes difficult to incorporate. Some songs, including the victory theme, included lyrics in Ancient Greek. The ending themes were "Tsuki Wo Miteita – Moongazing", written and performed by Kenshi Yonezu, and "My Star", written by Soken and performed by Amanda Achen.

"Tsuki Wo Miteita – Moongazing" was released as a digital single on June 26, 2023 alongside the game. The music album, Final Fantasy XVI Original Soundtrack, was released physically and digitally by Square Enix's music label on July 19. The physical versions were a standard seven-disc edition and an eight disc "Ultimate Edition". A digital album covering the game's downloadable content, Final Fantasy XVI - Original DLC Soundtrack - From Spire to Sea, was released on September 18, 2024. The main album and single reached high positions on sales charts, and the music overall had seen positive reviews from music and video game journalists.

== Creation and development ==
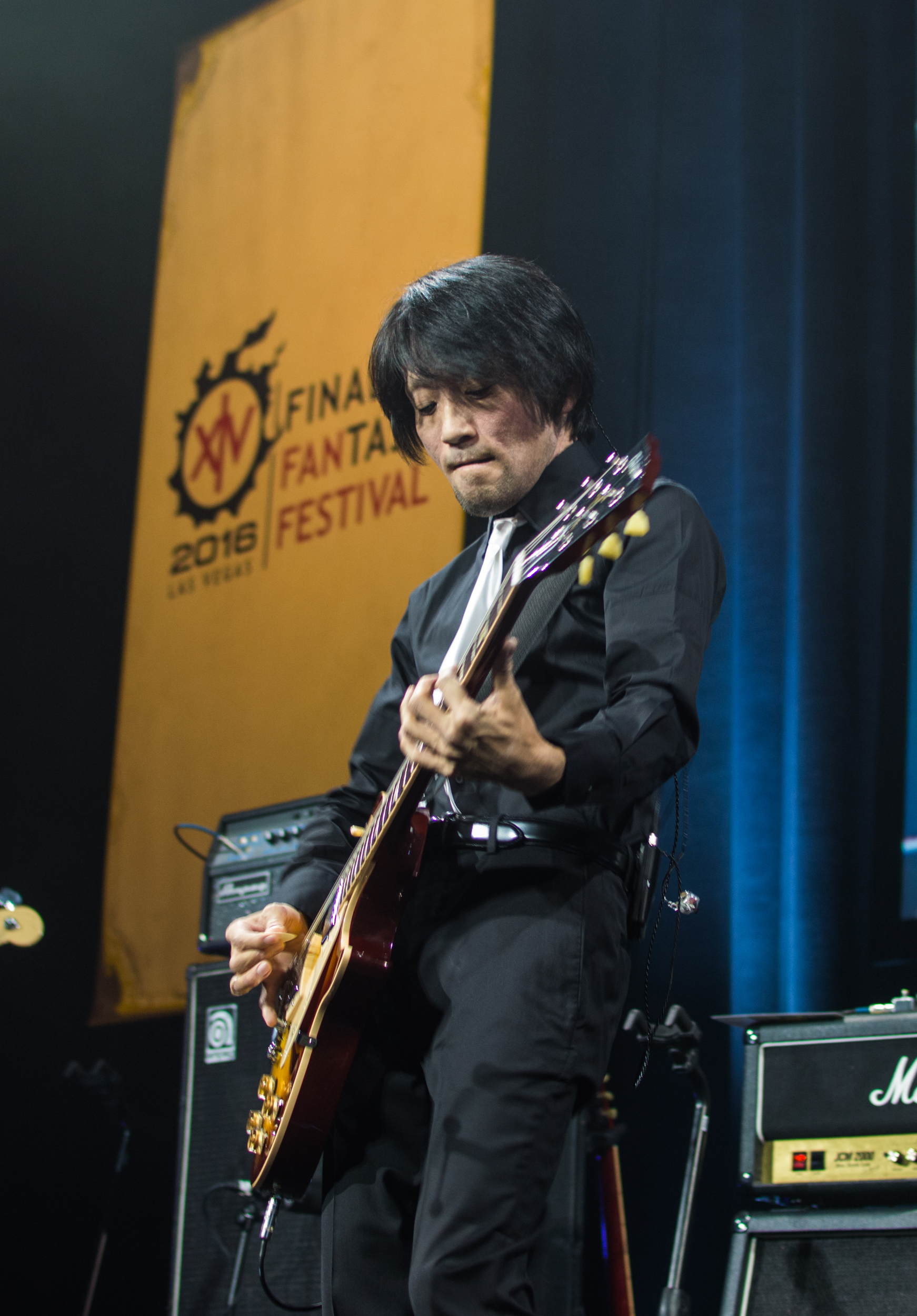
Masayoshi Soken (pictured 2016) was the main composer for Final Fantasy XVI.

The musical score for the Final Fantasy XVI was primarily composed by Masayoshi Soken. Soken acted as music director and lead composer. Additional tracks were created by Takafumi Imamura, Daiki Ishikawa, Saya Yasaki, and Justin Frieden. Arrangements were done by Soken, Imamura, Ishikawa, Yasaki, Frieden, Yoshitaka Suzuki, Ryo Furukawa, Keiko, and TomoLow. The first tracks were completed in early 2020. The music was the last element to be put in place, after the narrative and gameplay were set. Having worked for a long time on the MMORPG Final Fantasy XIV, which used multiple styles and paid homage to the entire series, Soken had trouble adjusting to composing for a single-player with a central narrative and musical tone. The guidelines for the score were "epic", "dark fantasy" and "preferably classic". Soken described the music as having a singular direction inspired by the overall dark fantasy setting, contrasting it against the variety and lighter tunes for XIV. So as to stop the music becoming disjointed, tracks reused a number of leitmotifs for consistency. To fit in with the darker theme, producer Naoki Yoshida wanted the score created with a live orchestra. Rather than using a single instrument or motif for the soundtrack, the music was written based on the locations it would be used.

Soken talked extensively with scenario writer Kazutoyo Maehiro about the score and matching it to the narrative's progress and themes. Initially asked to provide 140 songs, the game's final total was over 200, including variations on established character themes. He attributed the large number of songs to the wide variety of characters and situations, wanting to avoid repeating the same music too often. There were also a number of individual tracks for cutscenes to match the mood, rather than relying too much on character theme arrangements. Imamura and Ishikawa were fairly new arrivals, brought onto the project in early 2020 and working closely with Soken on their contributions. Keiko arranged several songs and themes for piano at Soken's request.

Soken's work on the game ran parallel to scoring the Final Fantasy XIV expansion Dawntrail. He described the experience as "a really horrible hell" due to the different compositional requirements and skills, coupled with the sheer workload. To ease music production, Soken created a dedicated sound engine for the PlayStation 5 environment. Dubbed the "Mini-Soken", the sound engine could edit and arrange music in real-time, adjusting a music's speed and volume based on a player's in-game actions. Soken wanted a system like this in place as many battles started seamlessly from real-time cutscenes, and he wanted the music to match that smooth transition. Soken and Imamura worked together on implementing the sound engine, with its implementation indirectly causing the number of in-game tracks to increase to account for variations and player progress. Soken, Imamura, and Ishikawa stayed together late into music production, adjusting the sound design and musical volume until close to release.

=== Composition ===
Creating a main theme was difficult as the game's story lacked a smaller narrative focus, covering large-scale events and characters. Soken instead gave multiple themes were given equivalent weight, emphasizing different characters' importance. Two themes remembered by Soken were "Find the Flame" and "Away", associated respectively with brothers Clive and Joshua Rosfield when they transformed into Eikons, the game's version of recurring summoned monsters. "Find the Flame" was written as an energetic and consistent track, while "Away" was intended to be sad due to the scene where Joshua first transforms. Soken later defined "Away" as a pillar piece for the soundtrack, while "Find the Flame" was originally created for a trailer and incorporated into the game at Imamura's request. While Clive is the main protagonist, due to story reasons Soken felt he had no main theme, as his development and progression relied on other characters. When writing the battle themes, as with the rest of the score, Soken kept common musical elements for consistency with battle tracks sharing the same melody. Due to the gameplay being action-based and not using separate battle arenas, field themes had different versions for when the player was exploring, approaching an enemy, and transitioning into battle to avoid jarring music changes.

To create a sombre tone, male choir was used frequently, especially for tracks involving the Eikons. With a notable exception, the Eikon themes were written in a classical style, with a focus on strings and brass instruments. That exception was the battle theme for Titan, which used a rock music style. Soken wrote that theme and put it into the game in secret, with the staff agreeing to keep it as they felt it fit the battle. Another theme with a different style was a battle against the monster Typhon, which Imamura created using electronic dance music. Several of the Eikon themes were references to their respective character's narratives and themes, such as Dion Lesage and his Eikon Bahamut being themed around tragedy and nobility. For the final sections of the game, the score was written to complement the story revelations and events.

Vocal lyrics were written for some themes at Soken's request. These songs were recorded relatively early in the music production, and ran into trouble with recording due to the COVID-19 pandemic, as the company did not have reliable remote recording set up. The English versions of songs were recorded first, and Soken had trouble matching them due to different pitches and keys. When recording the Japanese versions, Soken had the song recorded by members of the company's sound team. The lyrics were written by Maehiro and localization team members Michael-Christopher Koji Fox and John Taylor. One of the notable vocal tracks was the Victory Theme, which in earlier series entries was orchestral. To create a sense of otherness without using a fictional language, the lyrics were translated into Ancient Greek by Tomislav Milković. One recalled episode from the music writing was a bardic song performed both in spoken and sung form by a trained singer and actor that would change depending on Clive's position in the story. The songs proved difficult as they needed localizing in several languages and recording a cappella, which resulted in issues with the pitch and tempo. Song vocals were performed by Soken, Fox, and Takashi Baba.

Several recurring themes created by Nobuo Uematsu were arranged for the score. A recurring problem with the music was that the sombre tone clashed with several of these reused tracks. The Prelude, a recurring theme, was a challenge for Soken to include due to being originally written in a major key. To match the tone Yoshida wanted, Soken reworked the Prelude into a minor key. The "Victory Theme" was also included and rewritten to have a dark tone using a male choir. The Victory Theme was reworked nearly thirty times during production, with Soken calling his initial draft for it "absolutely terrible". A problematic track to include was the recurring "Chocobo" theme, which had an established light and playful tone. Rather than a full track, it was included as a short jingle. The series' recurring main theme was arranged into the track "A New Beginning" for the final cutscene. Several original themes also referenced pieces from earlier Final Fantasy games.

=== Theme songs ===
The main theme song, "Tsuki Wo Miteita – Moongazing", was written and performed by Kenshi Yonezu. It was co-arranged by Yonezu and Yuta Bandoh. Both Yonezu and Yoshida expressed pleasure and enthusiasm at the collaboration, as each was a fan of the other's work. Yonezu, a long-time fan of the series, was excited about Final Fantasy XVI when it was announced and voiced a wish to write its theme song. His staff contacted series developer and publisher Square Enix about a collaboration, and Yoshida reached out to Yonezu and asked him to participate in creating the theme song while the game was still in development rather than rushing closer to release. Yonezu and Yoshida talked frequently during the song's creation, with Yoshida giving updates on the game's progress and content. Yonezu both read the script, and saw cutscenes at various stages of development. Contrasted with his earlier songs, which placed a heavy focus on pop and lacked an emphasis on the associated narrative, Yonezu created the theme to heavily reference the narrative and have a less pop-style instrumentation.

Yonezu wanted to create a song that would offer hope for Clive, as he wanted him to have a happy ending after going through a harsh life. Describing the writing process, Yonezu created the initial demo based on what he had been told about the story, revising the text and tone as he played through a pre-release version. The song's tone was adjusted to match Clive's potential feelings at the game's ending; while he destroys Valisthea's Mothercrystals to provide a better future and gains a kind of freedom, he also bears the guilt of ending a way of life and bringing hardship to the world. He summarised this feeling as "a sense of salvation and a kind of grudge that would never be healed". As the game's story focuses on Clive and his brother Joshua, the song was originally about that perspective. Talking with Yoshida, Yonezu felt the heroine Jill Warrick was unrepresented, so the song ended up focusing on their relationship, with the lyrics referencing the full moon seen by both. The title was originally provisional, but as development ended, Yonezu decided to make it the official name.

A second ending theme was "My Star", described as the main theme for Jill, with its tone and lyrics representing the story's thematic conclusion. "My Star" was written by Soken and arranged by Keiko, with lyrics by Fox in English and Maehiro in Japanese. Originally unplanned, a vocal theme dedicated to Jill was included at Ishikawa and Imamura's insistence during the playtesting stage. "My Star" was sung by Amanda Achen, who had previously performed vocal pieces for Final Fantasy XIV. Compared to the classical choral tone of other pieces written for Achen, "My Star" was written as a "jazzy, mellow melody" which Soken was unsure Achen could do. He nonetheless asked her to audition, and was shocked by her performance, saying she sang it perfectly. Soken also created an orchestral version called "My Lady" for a specific cutscene. He called "My Star" the piece from the soundtrack which gave him the most "deep feelings".

== Releases ==
=== Final Fantasy XVI Original Soundtrack ===
Final Fantasy XVI Original Soundtrack

Soundtrack album by Masayoshi Soken
- Released: July 19, 2023
- Genre: Video game soundtrack
- Length: 8:06:42; 8:51:44 (Ultimate Edition)
- Label: Square Enix Music
- Producers: Akio Shiraishi; Shohei Negishi

Masayoshi Soken chronology
Death Unto Dawn: Final Fantasy XIV Original Soundtrack (2021)	Final Fantasy XVI Original Soundtrack (2023)

The official soundtrack album, Final Fantasy XVI Original Soundtrack, was released physically and digitally on July 19, 2023, through Square Enix's music label. The physical edition came in a standard seven-disc release, and an eight-disc "Ultimate Edition". The seventh disc is dedicated to late-game story-related tracks, while the Ultimate Edition-exclusive eighth disc includes smaller cutscene tracks and unused or beta pieces. A small promotional album featuring six tracks from the album, Final Fantasy XVI Original Soundtrack Prelude, was released on July 6 the same year. The track "Find the Flame" was released in June ahead of the game's release. The album includes 199 tracks covering most of the game's music, with some tracks being composites of multiple smaller pieces.

Patrick Gann of RPGFan gave praise to both the original tracks and the arrangements of series themes and motifs, though he felt the eight-disc "Ultimate Edition" was overwhelming to listen to in one sitting. He also noted the use of multiple genres across the game, highlighting the Titan battle theme and "My Star". Cat Bussell of TechRadar lauded the score as a key part of the game's storytelling and called the soundtrack "the best and most interesting video game soundtrack of the year." Reviewers of the game praised the soundtrack, and the game won in the "Best Score and Music" category at The Game Awards 2023.

==== Track listing ====
Disc 1
No.	Title	Music	Length
1.	"Land of Eikons"	Masayoshi Soken, Nobuo Uematsu	2:27
2.	"Away (Overture)"	Soken, Uematsu	2:39
3.	"The Lion and the Hare – The Nysa Defile"	Uematsu	3:07
4.	"Shattered"	Soken	4:21
5.	"A Rose Is a Rose"	Soken	4:30
6.	"Return of the Archduke"	Soken	2:44
7.	"My Lady"	Soken	1:52
8.	"Into the Mire – Stillwind"	Soken	4:48
9.	"Sixteen Bells"	Soken	4:59
10.	"There His Quarry Lies"	Justin Frieden	1:30
11.	"On the Wind Borne – The Rosarian Ducal Anthem"	Soken	1:09
12.	"Duty"	Soken	2:41
13.	"Enterprising Traders"	Saya Yasaki, Takafumi Imamura	2:32
14.	"Betrayal – Phoenix Gate"	Soken	4:25
15.	"Twin Flames"	Soken	0:46
16.	"Found"	Soken	0:13
17.	"Time and Death"	Soken	1:45
18.	"The Match"	Soken	0:45
19.	"Away"	Soken	6:40
20.	"Winter's Bound"	Soken	4:43
21.	"Frozen Tears"	Soken	0:21
22.	"Tonitrua ex Machina"	Imamura	1:03
23.	"Gathering Cloud"	Soken	1:17
Total length:			1:01:25

Disc 2
No.	Title	Music	Length
1.	"Hide, Hideaway"	Imamura	5:27
2.	"Lovely, Dark, and Deep – The Greatwood"	Soken	5:24
3.	"Too Bloody Quiet"	Soken, Uematsu	2:00
4.	"The Chase"	Frieden	0:40
5.	"Idylls of the Empire"	Soken	2:54
6.	"Words to the Wise"	Imamura	1:45
7.	"Domina"	Soken, Uematsu	2:33
8.	"Before the Storm – Caer Norvent"	Soken	5:24
9.	"Thunderstorm"	Imamura	1:09
10.	"The Shepherd's Lament"	Soken	0:59
11.	"A Land in Peril"	Soken, Uematsu	2:58
12.	"Brothers"	Soken	1:30
13.	"Downburst"	Soken	1:35
14.	"Vengeance Found"	Soken	0:47
15.	"Calling"	Soken	0:39
16.	"Against the Wind – The Eye of the Tempest"	Soken, Uematsu	4:19
17.	"Control"	Soken, Uematsu	7:50
18.	"Fanfare"	Uematsu	0:12
19.	"Fall from Grace"	Imamura	1:02
20.	"A Pendant Darkly"	Soken	1:29
21.	"The Battle of Belenus Tor"	Soken	3:26
Total length:			54:12

Disc 3
No.	Title	Music	Length
1.	"Whitewater – Kingsfall"	Soken	5:28
2.	"Dying Sun"	Uematsu	0:22
3.	"On the Shoulders of Giants"	Soken, Uematsu	5:13
4.	"A Long Way Down"	Soken	1:06
5.	"Out of Time"	Soken	0:18
6.	"Aligned"	Soken	1:36
7.	"Forevermore – The Grand Duchy of Rosaria"	Soken	3:07
8.	"The Founder's Footsteps"	Imamura	3:49
9.	"Happier Times"	Soken	2:04
10.	"A Prayer to Metia"	Soken	2:14
11.	"Found (Reprise)"	Soken	0:07
12.	"Where It All Began – The Apodytery"	Soken	4:18
13.	"We Are You"	Soken	0:55
14.	"Away (Refrain)"	Soken	1:29
15.	"Press On"	Soken	3:53
16.	"Find the Flame"	Soken	3:32
17.	"Who I Really Am"	Soken	1:05
18.	"The Se7enth Sin"	Soken	1:52
19.	"A Mother's Madness"	Frieden, Uematsu	0:47
20.	"Unforgiven"	Frieden	0:32
21.	"Acceptance"	Soken	0:55
22.	"The Journey Begins"	Uematsu	0:28
23.	"Will of the Goddess"	Soken	2:10
24.	"Histoire – The Holy Empire of Sanbreque"	Soken	2:58
25.	"Sway"	Imamura	2:09
26.	"Treading Lightly – The Glass Gate"	Soken	4:40
27.	"Reflections – Drake's Head"	Soken, Uematsu	5:48
28.	"The Heart"	Uematsu	0:21
29.	"Deliver Us Thunder"	Imamura	0:38
30.	"Babel of Savage Screams"	Soken	1:29
31.	"Catacecaumene"	Soken	3:52
32.	"The Outlaw"	Imamura	2:40
33.	"In Ashen Grip"	Soken	1:36
Total length:			1:13:44

Disc 4
No.	Title	Music	Length
1.	"Evening the Odds"	Imamura	0:41
2.	"Our Terms"	Imamura	3:16
3.	"The State of the Realm"	Soken, Uematsu	2:33
4.	"And Melancholy Marked Him"	Soken	0:58
5.	"Death Looks Down"	Frieden	1:16
6.	"Ghosts of the Past"	Soken	0:36
7.	"Color and Crackle"	Daiki Ishikawa	4:18
8.	"An Unexpected Visit"	Soken	1:05
9.	"An Outlaw's Uncle"	Uematsu	1:57
10.	"Currents"	Soken	1:56
11.	"Blood Beats Black – The Iron Kingdom"	Ishikawa	5:25
12.	"Out of the Frying Pan"	Ishikawa	0:38
13.	"The Promise"	Ishikawa	0:35
14.	"Enter the Oratrix – Drake's Breath"	Ishikawa	3:46
15.	"Màtham Sanomh"	Ishikawa	1:06
16.	"Monster"	Ishikawa, Uematsu	1:35
17.	"Fire and Ice"	Ishikawa	1:09
18.	"Harmatia"	Soken	5:32
19.	"In the Light of the Mothercrystal"	Uematsu	1:20
20.	"Azure Skies"	Uematsu	1:05
21.	"Desert Ministrations"	Soken, Imamura	2:10
22.	"Beasts Among Beasts"	Imamura	3:11
23.	"Homecoming – Rosalith"	Soken	5:58
24.	"Fenris Kindir"	Ishikawa	0:34
25.	"The Host"	Soken	0:49
26.	"King of the World"	Soken	1:42
27.	"To Sail Forbidden Seas"	Soken	6:02
28.	"A Guest Most Welcome"	Soken	0:34
29.	"Vive l'Empire"	Frieden	0:36
30.	"Sand and Stone – The Republic of Dhalmekia"	Soken, Imamura	2:51
31.	"Fanfarrado de Chocobo"	Uematsu	0:11
32.	"The Thousand Tables"	Soken, Imamura	5:17
33.	"Courage"	Soken	2:02
Total length:			1:14:03

Disc 5
No.	Title	Music	Length
1.	"Anon Becomes a Mountain – Castle Dazbog"	Soken, Imamura	4:08
2.	"Titanomachy – Drake's Fang"	Soken, Imamura	4:44
3.	"Visions of Wind"	Soken, Uematsu	2:34
4.	"Do or Die"	Soken	2:13
5.	"Titan Lost"	Soken	7:37
6.	"Heart of Stone"	Soken	5:00
7.	"Consciousness"	Soken	2:07
8.	"Champion of the Empire"	Frieden	0:55
9.	"Uninvited"	Soken	0:45
10.	"O'er Shifting Sands Lie – The Republic of Dhalmekia"	Soken, Imamura	2:02
11.	"From the Shadows"	Soken	2:23
12.	"My Decree"	Soken	0:29
13.	"Rooftops – The Crystalline Dominion"	Ishikawa	5:11
14.	"Dreadwyrm"	Ishikawa, Uematsu	2:20
15.	"A City in Ruin"	Ishikawa	4:34
16.	"Facets of Rage – Drake's Tail"	Ishikawa	4:40
17.	"Bloodlines"	Uematsu	2:11
18.	"The Flame Alights"	Soken	0:25
19.	"Fiery Resolve"	Soken	0:30
20.	"Beyond the Heavens"	Soken	4:49
21.	"Ascension"	Soken	9:11
22.	"Brotherhood"	Soken	0:55
23.	"Kinslayer"	Imamura	1:39
24.	"Miséricorde"	Yasaki	0:46
25.	"The Final Temptation"	Soken	3:30
Total length:			1:15:53

Disc 6
No.	Title	Music	Length
1.	"Twilight"	Ishikawa	4:30
2.	"Dark Designs"	Soken	1:15
3.	"We Travel Together"	Uematsu	0:56
4.	"The Desert Dims – The Republic of Dhalmekia"	Soken, Imamura	3:00
5.	"Undying"	Soken	0:53
6.	"Under Siege – The Free Cities of Kanver"	Soken, Imamura	4:28
7.	"Furor"	Soken	4:30
8.	"The World Won't Save Itself"	Soken	0:27
9.	"No Risk, No Reward"	Soken	4:48
10.	"Darkest Before the Dawn – The Imperial Territory of Rosaria"	Soken	3:47
11.	"The Parting Sea"	Imamura	1:38
12.	"Army of One – The Einherjar"	Soken, Imamura	4:33
13.	"Mighty Acts of God"	Uematsu	1:12
14.	"Not Alone"	Soken	6:22
15.	"Heal"	Soken	1:33
16.	"Indomitable – The Kingdom of Waloed"	Soken, Imamura, Uematsu	4:20
17.	"Heavensbound – Reverie"	Soken, Imamura	6:10
18.	"Salvation"	Uematsu	1:24
19.	"Sever"	Soken	3:32
20.	"The Riddle"	Soken	5:45
21.	"One with God"	Soken	1:13
22.	"Fighting Fate"	Uematsu	1:51
23.	"Bastion – Stonhyrr"	Soken, Imamura	5:35
24.	"To Boldly Go"	Uematsu	0:50
25.	"A Debt Repaid"	Uematsu	1:33
26.	"Rapture"	Soken	0:50
Total length:			1:16:08

Disc 7
No.	Title	Music	Vocals	Length
1.	"Bow"	Soken		6:11
2.	"Death Shall Me Devour"	Soken, Uematsu		5:20
3.	"'Neath the Pall"	Soken, Uematsu		7:14
4.	"Once More"	Soken, Uematsu		1:02
5.	"Eschaton"	Soken, Uematsu		1:27
6.	"In Darkness Hope – The Holy Empire of Sanbreque"	Soken		3:48
7.	"A Better World"	Soken		2:45
8.	"Final Farewells"	Uematsu		2:42
9.	"A Far Cry from Heaven"	Soken		4:39
10.	"Only Forgiveness"	Soken		2:15
11.	"The Nexus"	Soken		3:06
12.	"Faith"	Soken, Uematsu		4:31
13.	"Logos"	Soken		3:10
14.	"Hymn of the Penitent"	Soken		3:22
15.	"All as One"	Soken, Uematsu		5:34
16.	"Horizons"	Uematsu		1:34
17.	"Holos"	Soken		4:11
18.	"My Star"	Soken	Amanda Achen	4:49
19.	"A New Beginning"	Uematsu		0:54
20.	"Land of Eikons (Reprise)"	Soken, Uematsu		2:30
Total length:				1:11:17

Disc 8
No.	Title	Music	Length
1.	"Cut from the Cloth"	Ishikawa	1:38
2.	"Priceless"	Soken	3:01
3.	"Old Friend"	Imamura	2:23
4.	"Death of a Council"	Imamura	0:56
5.	"Pathetic Creatures"	Soken	3:08
6.	"Where the Heart Is"	Imamura	3:23
7.	"Mourning"	Soken, Imamura	3:16
8.	"The Mural"	Uematsu	0:55
9.	"For the Water Was a Wall"	Soken	2:36
10.	"Away (1987)"	Soken, Uematsu	2:18
11.	"The Grand Duchy of Rosaria – Unused"	Ishikawa	2:19
12.	"The Imperial Province of Rosaria – Unused"	Soken	3:00
13.	"The Republic of Dhalmekia – Unused"	Imamura	2:56
14.	"Mid Boss Battle – Unused"	Soken, Uematsu	2:05
15.	"Ifrit vs Ifrit – Unused"	Soken	2:11
16.	"The Kingdom of Waloed – Unused"	Imamura	2:45
17.	"Ifrit vs Last Boss – Unused"	Soken	3:37
18.	"Ending – Unused"	Soken	2:35
Total length:			45:02

==== Charts ====
Chart performance for Final Fantasy XVI Original Soundtrack
Chart (2023)	Peak position
Japanese Albums (Oricon)	11
Japanese Combined Albums (Oricon)	11
Japanese Hot Albums (Billboard Japan)	10
UK Album Downloads (Official Charts)	23

=== Final Fantasy XVI - Original DLC Soundtrack - From Spire to Sea ===
Final Fantasy XVI - Original DLC Soundtrack - From Spire to Sea

Soundtrack album by Masayoshi Soken and Saya Yasaki
- Released: September 18, 2024
- Genre: Video game soundtrack
- Length: 1:05:57
- Label: Square Enix Music

Final Fantasy XVI was expanded with two downloadable content (DLC) expansions; Echoes of the Fallen in December 2023, and The Rising Tide in April 2024. The DLC's music was co-composed by Soken and Yasaki. During production, the DLC's director Takeo Kujiraoka showed Soken footage of where he wanted a piece to be. Soken would also contribute elements of his own to the score. For Echoes of the Fallen, Soken created a new arrangement of the battle theme for the recurring series boss Omega. This song used digital rock as a musical guideline to contrast against the main game's orchestral style. For The Rising Tide, Yoshida described Soken as "going all out" with the game's established musical style. The track for the Eikon Leviathan's battle also followed the established pattern of a complex theme which changed depending on the phase.

An 18-track digital album for the downloadable content of Final Fantasy XVI, titled Final Fantasy XVI - Original DLC Soundtrack - From Spire to Sea, was released on September 18, 2024 worldwide for streaming and download.

No.	Title	Music	Length
1.	"The Worm Mounts"	Soken	6:20
2.	"The Secret of Its Laboring Heart"	Soken	7:07
3.	"Eikonoklasm"	Soken	6:11
4.	"Our Mothers' Sky"	Yasaki	0:42
5.	"The Ceaseless Rill"	Yasaki	5:12
6.	"From Spire to Sea"	Yasaki	0:30
7.	"Writ in Water"	Yasaki	2:46
8.	"Safe Haven"	Soken	4:04
9.	"Unforgivable"	Soken	0:52
10.	"Bid Time Return"	Yasaki	4:35
11.	"O Call Back Yesterday"	Soken	5:17
12.	"Black and Gold"	Soken, Uematsu	1:10
13.	"Eternal Vigil"	Soken	2:00
14.	"Never to Break"	Soken	4:29
15.	"A Most Profaned Fragment"	Soken	4:29
16.	"High Tide"	Soken	2:23
17.	"Cascade"	Soken, Uematsu	5:34
18.	"Immersion"	Soken	2:24
Total length:			1:06

=== "Tsuki Wo Miteita – Moongazing" ===
The theme song "Tsuki Wo Miteita – Moongazing" (月を見ていた) was released as a digital single on online stores and streaming platforms on June 19, 2023. The single featured a cover created by Yonezu featuring a wolf based on the character Torgal. A music video for the song was released on July 6. Directed by Osrin of the music group Perimetron, the video features three overlapping narratives matched to the song's tone.

The single was a commercial success upon release, with Oricon recording over 31,000 downloads over two weeks and ranking first in its singles chart. It was the thirteenth number one single for Yonezu, and tying with Yoasobi for highest-selling solo single. Over its first two days of release, the single ranked first on all major distribution sites across daily and real-time rankings. Billboard Japan described the song as "a moving number with deeply layered sound and emotional vocals". Adam Klayl of Push Square described the song as "a pretty grim offering" which fitted in with the game's dark tone.
