= Masayoshi Soken =

Japanese composer (born 1975)

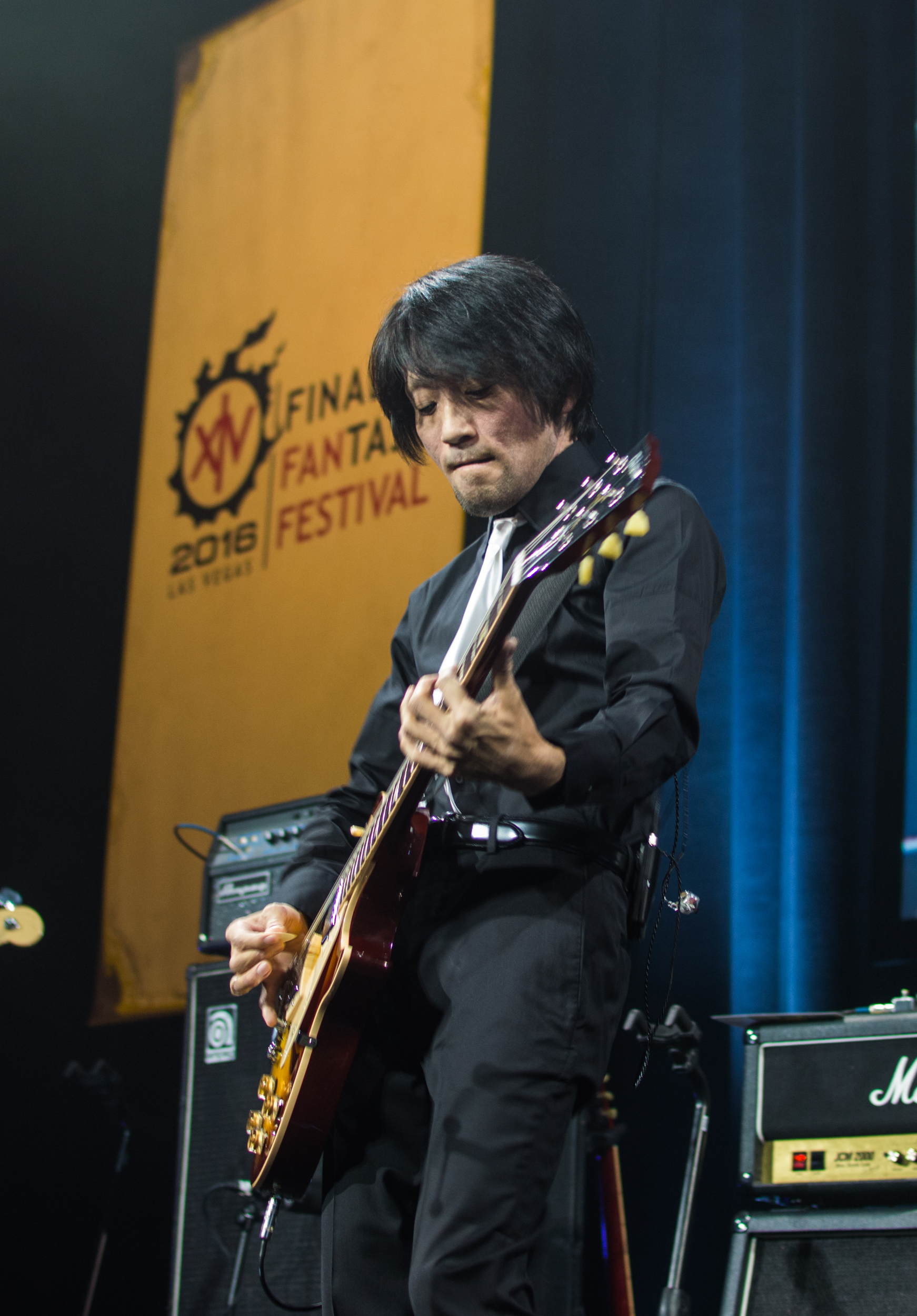
- Soken in 2016
- Born: January 10, 1975 (age 51); Tokyo, Japan
- Other names: Sorbonne Soken; Luis Noma
- Education: Tokyo University of Science
- Occupations: Composer; sound designer
- Years active: 1998–present
- Employers: Konami (1998); Square Enix (1998–present)
- Musical career
- Genres: Rock; jazz rock; pop rock; electronic rock; video game music
- Instruments: Piano; guitar

Masayoshi Soken (祖堅 正慶, Soken Masayoshi; born January 10, 1975) is a Japanese video game composer who has worked for Square Enix since 1998. Soken is best known for being the lead composer and sound director of Final Fantasy XIV and its expansions and lead composer of Final Fantasy XVI.

== Biography ==
Soken was born on January 10, 1975, in Tokyo, Japan. He majored in chemistry at the Tokyo University of Science. He was exposed to music at a young age—his father was a professional trumpet player and his mother taught piano. Rather than pursue a career in science, he was hired as a sound editor and designer at Konami. At Konami, he worked on the arcade rail shooting game Evil Night. He joined Square in 1998 and his early work at the company primarily focused on sound effect design, rather than composition. He assisted Kenji Ito on sports video games such as Gekikuukan Pro Baseball: The End of the Century 1999. His debut as a composer came with the Japan-exclusive sports games Nichibeikan Pro Baseball: Final League, in which he was the sole composer, and World Fantasista with synthesizer programmer Takeharu Ishimoto.

In 2005, Soken worked on Drakengard 2 and Front Mission 5: Scars of the War. The following year, Soken made his debut as a lead composer in Mario Hoops 3-on-3. Along with Kenji Ito and Tsuyoshi Sekito, he created the soundtrack to Dawn of Mana (known as "Seiken Densetsu 4" in Japan), with Academy Award-winning composer Ryuichi Sakamoto providing the main theme. Soken also arranged a few tracks from previous Mana games, and performed the electric guitar for his arrangements. In 2007, he scored the online game Elebest with Ai Yamashita.

Soken has also contributed to Square Enix advertisements; Front Mission 5: Scars of the War (2005) featured the sports commercial song "Blue Stream", Soken's only composition in the game. He also participated in a Square Enix advertisement for pencils where he got beaten up by two robots; the commercial featured music composed by him. Soken created the fanfare for Square Enix Music TV, a monthly video feature where new album releases are discussed and interviews with Square Enix composers are conducted. For the iTunes-exclusive Square Enix Music Official Bootleg collection, Soken contributed the piece "Dog Street" for the first volume in 2006, and "Languid Afternoon" for the third volume in 2007; he went under the alias "Sorbonne Soken" on the third volume. In 2008, he composed the Japan-exclusive Nanashi no Game, this time under the pseudonym "Luis Noma". In 2010, he composed another sports game for the Wii, Mario Sports Mix.

Since the 2010 development team reshuffling, he has been sound director for Final Fantasy XIV. Soken became primary composer for the title with the launch of A Realm Reborn and the expansions that followed. He formed a rock band called The Primals, with members of the sound team and translator Michael-Christopher Koji Fox, to play at Final Fantasy XIV events such as Fan Festival. The Primals have since released several albums starting with Final Fantasy XIV: From Astral to Umbral. Nobuo Uematsu's illness in 2018 prevented him from contributing the main theme to Shadowbringers as he had for every previous expansion; Soken was tasked with the composition. Shadowbringers was the first expansion in the Final Fantasy XIV series to be written without Uematsu's direct involvement. He has toured with The Primals across Japan, including shows at Makuhari Messe, Yokohama Arena, Nippon Budokan, and Tokyo Dome. He performed with The Primals at Download Festival at Leicestershire, England in 2026.

In May 2021, during the Final Fantasy XIV Digital Fan Festival, Soken announced that he had been receiving chemotherapy for cancer treatment throughout most of 2020, adding that the cancer was in remission. Soken kept the treatment hidden from most of the development team, doing some of his work for Final Fantasy XIV from the hospital.

In September 2020, Square Enix announced that Final Fantasy XVI was in development for PlayStation 5. Though not detailed initially, in June 2022, further information was revealed, including that Soken would be the game's lead composer. For his work on Final Fantasy XVI, Soken and his team would be nominated and then win the Game Award for Best Score and Music in 2023.

== Musical style and influences ==
Soken primarily approaches his game composing with the player's experience in mind. When tasked with arranging Final Fantasy music originally composed by Nobuo Uematsu, he takes extra care to achieve this goal. Soken credits his experience as a sound designer, sound editor, and voice editor for helping him handle the pressure of the Final Fantasy XIV remake. He primarily composes using piano and keyboard but prefers playing guitar in live performances.

Soken's favorite bands are Rage Against the Machine and Pennywise. In 2025, he was able to collaborate with Tom Morello, guitarist for Rage Against the Machine, on a track for Final Fantasy XIV: Dawntrail. After hearing of Soken's admiration for Rage Against the Machine from frequent Final Fantasy XIV collaborator Jason Charles Miller, Morello wrote and performed the track, "Everything Burns", with the band Beartooth and it was used as part of the Arcadion Heavyweight raid series.

== Works ==
Year	Title	Notes
1998	Evil Night	Music with Yasuhiro Ichihashi and Yuichi Takamine
2000	Gekikuukan Pro Baseball: The End of the Century 1999	Music with Kenji Ito
2002	Nichibeikan Pro Baseball: Final League	Music
2002	World Fantasista	Arrangement ("Call To Arms" and "Empty Baggage" with Takeharu Ishimoto)
2005	Front Mission 5: Scars of the War	"Blue Stream"
2006	Mario Hoops 3-on-3	Music
2006	Dawn of Mana	Music with Kenji Ito, Tsuyoshi Sekito, and Ryuichi Sakamoto
2007	Elebest	Music with Ai Yamashita
2008	Nanashi no Game	Music
2009	Nanashi no Game: Me	Music
2009	Noroi no Game: Chi	Music
2009	Noroi no Game: Oku	Music
2009	Natsu no Arashi! Akinai-chuu	Anime; ending theme music ("Otome no Junjo")
2010	Final Fantasy XIV (original)	Music with various others
2010	Mario Sports Mix	Music with Kumi Tanioka
2011	Ikenie no Yoru	Music with Ai Yamashita
2013	Final Fantasy XIV	Music
2015	Final Fantasy XIV: Heavensward	Expansion; music with various others
2017	Final Fantasy XIV: Stormblood	Expansion; music with various others
2019	Final Fantasy XIV: Shadowbringers	Expansion; music with various others
2021	Final Fantasy XIV: Endwalker	Expansion; music with various others
2023	Final Fantasy XVI	Music with various others
2024	Final Fantasy XIV: Dawntrail	Expansion; music with various others
2027	Final Fantasy XIV: Evercold	Expansion; music with various others

== See also ==
- Music of Final Fantasy XIV
- Music of Final Fantasy XVI
