= Mario Sports Mix =

2010 video game

- Developer: Square Enix
- Publisher: Nintendo
- Director: Shin Azuma
- Producers: Toyokazu Nonaka; Hiroyuki Miura
- Artist: Gen Kobayashi
- Composers: Masayoshi Soken; Kumi Tanioka
- Series: Mario Sports
- Platform: Wii
- Release: JP: November 25, 2010; AU: January 27, 2011; EU: January 28, 2011; UK: February 4, 2011; NA: February 7, 2011
- Genre: Sports
- Modes: Single-player, multiplayer

Mario Sports Mix (Note: Mario Sports Mix (マリオスポーツミックス, Mario Supōtsu Mikkusu)) is a 2010 sports video game developed by Square Enix and published by Nintendo for the Wii. It features volleyball, ice hockey, dodgeball, and basketball. The game features mostly characters and locations from the Mario series with a few guest appearances by characters from Square Enix's Final Fantasy and Dragon Quest series of games. Players can also opt to play as one of their Mii characters.

The game received mixed reviews from critics, who praised its presentation, variety, and gameplay, but criticized its lack of depth and replayability. The game was a commercial success, selling 1.98 million copies, thus making it one of the Wii's best-selling games.

== Gameplay ==
Gameplay of basketball, one of the game's four sports

The game is played much in the vein of past Mario sports games, with features such as powerful special moves and over-the-top, arcade-like gameplay, including the use of a "coin redemption system" that allows players to collect coins that are immediately spent on adding extra points to the next goal they score. Both cooperative and competitive local multiplayer modes are featured: depending on the sport, two players (two-on-two) or three players (three-on-three) can play cooperative multiplayer and four players (two-on-two) can play competitive multiplayer in two teams of two. Region locked online multiplayer is also featured, with two players per Wii console joining up to play two-on-two matches either against friends or against random players.

The game features most of the characters and locations from the Mario franchise with a few guest appearances by characters from Square Enix's Final Fantasy and Dragon Quest series of games. The Ninja, White Mage, Black Mage, Cactuar and Moogle characters all appear from the Final Fantasy series, while the Slime monster from the Dragon Quest series also appears. Players can also opt to play as one of their Mii characters.

== Plot ==
The story mode takes place in the Mushroom Kingdom where Toad is gardening flowers, when all of a sudden, an object crashes behind Princess Peach's castle. Toad then runs to the object (along with a few other Toads), and finds a red crystal containing a basketball, a green crystal containing a volleyball, a yellow crystal containing a dodgeball, and a blue crystal containing a coin (which serves as a hockey puck). While observing the mysterious crystals, the Toads come up with an idea of introducing new sports—basketball, volleyball, dodgeball, and hockey—to the Mushroom Kingdom. Toad then organizes tournaments for the four sports.

After the player beats the game in all four sports individually, the player is taken to a boss fight against Behemoth from Final Fantasy. After beating Behemoth, a Sports Mix mode is unlocked. It is largely identical to the previous tournaments, with the exception that all four sports are played in the tournament, and that the final boss is different, being Behemoth King instead of Behemoth.

== Development ==
Mario Sports Mix is the third Mario game developed by Square Enix after Super Mario RPG and Mario Hoops 3-on-3 and was first shown at E3 2010. During the Nintendo E3 presentation, Reggie Fils-Aimé stated that none of the included sports had featured in any previous Mario sports title. However, three of them have been featured in some fashion: basketball was the main focus of Mario Hoops 3-on-3 (and there are basketball-based minigames in Mario Party, Mario Party 4, Mario Party 6 and Mario Party 8); volleyball minigames were featured in Mario Party 4 and Mario Party 5; and hockey was a featured sport in Mario Party 5 and Mario & Sonic at the Olympic Winter Games. Mario Sports Mix marks the first time dodgeball has been featured in a Mario sports title and the first time the other three have been featured in prominent roles in a home console title.

== Reception ==
Reception

Aggregate scores
Aggregator	Score
GameRankings	65.56%
Metacritic	64/100

Review scores
Publication	Score
Eurogamer	7/10
Famitsu	30/40
Game Informer	4.5/10
GameSpot	4/10
GamesRadar+	4/5
Giant Bomb	2/5
IGN	6.5/10
Nintendo Life	8/10
Nintendo Power	8/10
Nintendo World Report	7/10
Official Nintendo Magazine	72%
Common Sense Media	5/5

Famitsu released the first review for Mario Sports Mix approximately a week before its launch in Japan. The game received an overall score of 30/40, with two reviewers giving it 7/10 and two giving it 8/10. One reviewer praised the title for its "simple and easy" controls, while also commenting that the characters' special moves were "pretty neat" and that the courts included in the game were "fun in their own way". However, concern was raised with the number of playable sports, with one reviewer commenting that "with only four sports included, some people might get bored pretty fast."

Mario Sports Mix has received average reviews, having an aggregate score of 64/100 on Metacritic and a GameRankings of 66%. IGN's Jack DeVries rated the game 6.5, stating "it could make a fun party game, but this is a pretty weak offering". They praised the graphics, calling the animations "well done", and said "everything is bright and smooth". They also praised the music, calling it "fun and energetic, though kind of repetitive." Eurogamer's Keza MacDonald rated the game 7/10 and Common Sense Media gave the game 5 stars and an on rating for ages 8 and up, Saying "Top-notch sports compilation is good fun for all ages." GameSpot, however, gave the game a low rating of 4/10 stating that "Every sport is tedious and shallow", "Computer opponents are too easy or too cheap", "Requires very little skill", "Too much chaos in the competitions" and "None of the sports offer anything new or unique". Official Nintendo Magazine also mentioned in its review that "volleyball is the weakest game of the four" because it only involves flicking the Wii remote and pressing A. It also noted issues with the unlockable characters because they are only Square Enix characters, which it stated that they "are a bit underwhelming" and that "Replacing them with other Mario characters would be much better".

As of April 2011, Mario Sports Mix has sold 1.54 million copies worldwide.

== See also ==
- List of Wii games
- Lists of sports video games
  - List of sports video games featuring Mario
- 2010 in video games
