= Mario Hoops 3-on-3 =

2006 video game

- North American box art
- Developer: Square Enix
- Publisher: Nintendo
- Director: Shin Azuma
- Producers: Toyokazu Nonaka; Hiroyuki Miura
- Artist: Gen Kobayashi
- Composer: Masayoshi Soken
- Series: Mario; Final Fantasy
- Platform: Nintendo DS
- Release: JP: July 27, 2006; NA: September 11, 2006; AU: October 26, 2006; EU: February 16, 2007
- Genre: Sports
- Modes: Single-player, multiplayer

Mario Hoops 3-on-3 (Note: Mario Basket 3on3 (マリオバスケ 3on3, Mario Basuke 3on3)), known in Europe as Mario Slam Basketball, is a 2006 sports game developed by Square Enix and published by Nintendo for the Nintendo DS. The game is the first in which Mario and Final Fantasy characters appear together as playable characters, and the second Mario game developed by Square Enix, after Super Mario RPG (1996). It is the only dedicated basketball game in the Mario series. The game was released in Japan on July 27, 2006, North America on September 11, 2006, Australia on October 26, 2006, and Europe on February 16, 2007.

The game features a series of three versus three basketball tournaments on different courts, each of three games. The game uses the Nintendo DS's touch screen extensively and features items and coins from the Mario series. The game received mixed reviews from critics, who praised the game for its gameplay, variety, presentation, and being amusing and fun, but criticized the AI balance, lack of online multiplayer, and limited multiplayer options, with full basketball games only being playable across two players locally who each had a copy of the game.

The game was succeeded by Mario Sports Mix for the Wii, also developed by Square Enix. It features other sports in addition to basketball and a different control scheme.

== Gameplay ==
While the 3D models of the characters, here seen as Princess Peach, Princess Daisy, Boo, Diddy Kong, White Mage, and (offscreen) Bowser Jr., take up the top half, the bottom half shows a map of the court.

The gameplay of Mario Hoops 3-on-3 is centered on basketball games, structured into tournaments that the player must win to progress. The tournament ladder is made with graphics based on the original Super Mario Bros. Each tournament consists of three games with two halves of two and a half minutes each. The one exception is an extra game with the Final Fantasy team at the end of the final tournament. The player can win a tournament by winning the three games on its ladder. Upon winning, the player is awarded either a gold cup, a silver cup, or a bronze cup. These cups correspond with winning by more than 200 points cumulatively across the three matches, 100 points, or simply winning all three games.

The matches feature three players on each side, with characters drawn primarily from Mario and other Nintendo games, as well as characters from Square Enix's Final Fantasy series. During matches, the Nintendo DS touch control is used for all actions except for movement, which can be handled by the directional pad. The player can also control directly via the touch screen. The top screen of the DS shows the game in 3D, while the bottom screen shows an overhead view of the whole court. Dribbling is performed automatically, but slower if the touch screen is not used actively to dribble.

The player can perform multiple moves, such as stealing the ball and passing, by using gestures on the touchpad. The player shoots by drawing a line forward on the touchscreen. Depending on where the character is and how he/she is moving, the shot will either be a normal shot, a special shot, or a slam dunk; these shots give the team different numbers of points. The basketball court contains multiple coin pads, which give the player coins when dribbled on up to a maximum value; when the player makes a shot, their coins are added to their total point score. Some items appear on the court; when used they grant the player special moves.

There are two game modes: normal and hard. Hard mode is unlocked after the game is beaten on normal. In addition to the regular tournament game, there is an exhibition mode. In this mode, the player can customize the rules such as the amount of playing time, the number of periods played and turning items on or off. Multiplayer is limited to local games, and each player must own their own copy of the game. The game does not have online multiplayer, and the "game sharing" option (playing multiplayer across only one copy of the game) only allows for the playing of select minigames, not full basketball games.

== Reception ==
Reception

Aggregate score
Aggregator	Score
Metacritic	69/100

Review scores
Publication	Score
Edge	7/10
Electronic Gaming Monthly	6.17/10
Eurogamer	6/10
Game Informer	6.5/10
GamePro	4/5
GameRevolution	C
GameSpot	7.1/10
GameSpy	4/5
GameTrailers	7.1/10
IGN	(AU) 7.4/10 (UK) 7/10 (US) 6.8/10
Nintendo Power	7.5/10
Nintendo World Report	8/10
The Sydney Morning Herald	3/5
The Times	3/5

The game received "mixed or average" reviews according to video game review aggregator website Metacritic. The game was generally praised for its control, graphics, and variety, but was criticized for its AI balance, limited multiplayer options, overpowered skills for the Final Fantasy characters, and lack of Nintendo Wi-Fi connection support.

411Mania gave the game a score of 7.5 out of 10 and said it was "a game that could've easily been rated much higher had there been Wi-Fi connectivity, smarter AI and a richer single card download-play option. Not including Wi-Fi was inexcusable as it would have easily been one of the most played games online. [...] I'd honestly recommend this game for any DS owner out there as I feel the game at least deserves a try. Some will be hooked, some won't, but you can't deny the fun of Mario Hoops 3 on 3." The Sydney Morning Herald gave it three stars out of five and called it "fast-paced stylus-swiping basketball action best suited to short matches against friends." The Times also gave it three stars out of five, saying, "The wild combinations of touch-pad and direction keys required to play make this a game you might not wish to use on public transport, and it somehow lacks the charm of previous Mario-themed games. Good, but not great." Regarding the game's AI difficulty, Nintendo World Report considered the game becomes progressively very difficult, stating that its tournament mode "swings from very easy to nearly impossible" and called it "possibly the hardest Mario sports game" at the time.

As of July 25, 2007, Mario Hoops 3-on-3 has sold 1.5 million copies worldwide.
