= Music of Final Fantasy XIV =

Music from the video game Final Fantasy XIV

The music for the MMORPG Final Fantasy XIV was composed by Nobuo Uematsu, a regular contributor to the music of the Final Fantasy series. Several other composers including Masayoshi Soken and Naoshi Mizuta contributed music for updates to the game. The music for the game's reboot, Final Fantasy XIV: A Realm Reborn, and subsequent expansions, is compiled of a collection of original and remixed songs by numerous composers, namely Uematsu, Soken, as well as others including guest composers such as Keiichi Okabe of the Nier series. Soken was the sound director for both releases of the game. Music from both releases of the game has been released in several albums. A pair of mini-albums containing a handful of selected tracks from XIV, Final Fantasy XIV: Battle Tracks and Final Fantasy XIV: Field Tracks, were released by Square Enix in 2010 when XIV first launched. A soundtrack album titled Final Fantasy XIV - Eorzean Frontiers, containing most of the music that had been released by that point for XIV, was digitally released in 2012. A final soundtrack album for the original release of the game, Before Meteor: Final Fantasy XIV Original Soundtrack, was released in 2013 just before the launch of A Realm Reborn, and contains all of the music that was composed for XIV throughout its lifetime.

Since the release of A Realm Reborn, soundtrack albums have been released for the relaunch, as well as for its five major expansions: Heavensward (2015), Stormblood (2017), Shadowbringers (2019), Endwalker (2021), and Dawntrail (2024). Additionally, several albums have been released covering piano, rock, and electronic arrangements of songs from the game.

The soundtracks for both releases of the game were well received by critics. Uematsu's mix of orchestral and rock tracks for XIV were praised, though the delayed release of a full album drew criticism. Soken's work on A Realm Reborn, including both his original tracks as well as themes carried over from XIV and previous Final Fantasy games, were heavily praised by reviewers for the game. Music from the initial release of the game has been played in the international Distant Worlds Final Fantasy concert series, and books of sheet music for piano arrangements of music from the game have been produced.

== Creation and influence ==
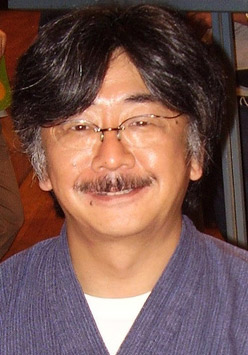
Composer Nobuo Uematsu in 2006.

The massively multiplayer online role-playing game (MMORPG) Final Fantasy XIV was released in two versions: the original (live between 2010 and 2012), and its remake (Final Fantasy XIV: A Realm Reborn, live since 2013). The music for XIV was composed by Nobuo Uematsu, who was the lead composer for the first ten main Final Fantasy games and a contributor to the Final Fantasy XI and XII soundtracks. Over the two years that XIV was active, several updates were made to the game, which included additional music composed by Masayoshi Soken, Naoshi Mizuta, Tsuyoshi Sekito and Ryo Yamazaki. XIV was poorly received, and despite the updates, Square Enix decided to take the game offline for a time, and relaunch it with a new development team under a new name. Soken, the sound director for both releases, composed the soundtrack to A Realm Reborn.

Prior to agreeing to create XIV's score, Uematsu had already planned to compose "Kimi ga Iru Kara", the theme song for Final Fantasy XIII. Wanting him to fully focus on XIV, Square Enix asked XIII's main composer Masashi Hamauzu to write the song instead. Thus, XIII was the first main-series Final Fantasy game soundtrack to not include Uematsu's work. Despite XIV being an MMO and thus a new genre for him, Uematsu treated it as any other video game project. Compared to his previous work within the series, Uematsu had considerable creative freedom while composing the soundtrack, because the rest of the production team did not fully envision beforehand how the soundtrack would sound or fit into the game. Uematsu created a mixture of orchestral and rock pieces for the game's battle themes. There was a momentary crisis when he lost most of the data for his completed tracks and needed to hire a data recovery service. He worked as a freelance composer during the project for Square Enix, also composing the music for The Last Story, a game from Final Fantasy creator Hironobu Sakaguchi. The game's theme song, "Answers", was sung by Susan Calloway. She was chosen by Uematsu, who had worked with her during the first Distant Worlds concert and was impressed by her singing abilities.

For A Realm Reborn, Soken was the primary contributor for numerous original and remixed songs, in addition to reprising his XIV role as lead sound director. The primary goal given to the music team was to make the music true to the series, such as remixed versions of traditional Final Fantasy theme songs including the Final Fantasy theme, Chocobo theme, victory fanfare as well as many others. Naoki Yoshida, the game's producer and director, told Soken to "give [the team] something straightforward that anyone could identify as Final Fantasy, with an easy-to-understand, expressive orchestral sound". Soken focused primarily on creating the soundtrack rather than his sound director role. He often created new tracks due to requests from staff members. As the game was developed and released in a shorter timeframe than the original release, Soken and the sound team were given less than a year to create both the music and the various sound effects for the game world. According to Soken, it felt like "enough work for two full games in that time". Unlike the freedom given Uematsu for XIV, most of the tracks for A Realm Reborn had specific guidelines, though Soken was allowed to "do what [he liked]" for Titan's battle theme. Soken sang the vocal work for some tracks, such as the battle theme for Leviathan. Several themes and tracks from the original game were carried over both directly and as a part of new tracks in A Realm Reborn, including the original vocal theme. Soken also remixed pieces from earlier Final Fantasy games for use in special in-game events.

== Original release ==
=== Mini-albums ===
Final Fantasy XIV: Battle Tracks Final Fantasy XIV: Field Tracks

Soundtrack album by Nobuo Uematsu
- Released: September 29, 2010
- Genre: Video game soundtrack
- Length: 34:36 (Battle Tracks); 45:05 (Field Tracks)

The mini-albums Final Fantasy XIV: Battle Tracks and Final Fantasy XIV: Field Tracks were the first releases of music from the game, and were published by Square Enix on September 29, 2010, a week after the game itself was released. They feature selected tracks from XIV. The music was composed by Uematsu and arranged by Tsutomu Narita. Kenichiro Fukui also helped arrange some of the pieces on the Field Tracks mini-album. Battle Tracks has nine pieces, and includes the game's opening theme, the boss theme "Nail of the Heavens", and Final Fantasy XIV's rendition of Uematsu's "Victory Fanfare". Field Tracks predominantly features the main themes for the game's countries Ul'dah, Gridania and Limsa Lominsa, along with other pieces of music heard during traveling, for a total of eight tracks. Each mini-album was accompanied by special liner notes by Uematsu describing his experiences writing music for the series, with particular reference to the first game.

Patrick Gann of RPGFan termed the mini-albums as a good return work from Uematsu despite some of the unexpected battle tracks, though he questioned whether the discs themselves would be worth purchasing once a full soundtrack album was released. Jayson Napolitano of Original Sound Version was generally positive, and cited the composition of the battle themes as "a cross between The Black Mages and Uematsu's work on Lord of Vermilion". The more orchestral field tracks were also praised. Chris Greening of Square Enix Music Online termed Field Tracks as "largely likeable", and appreciated Uematsu's use of rock music in Battle Tracks, though he disliked the strategy of releasing two incomplete mini-albums rather than a full soundtrack album. Both mini-albums sold well: Battle Tracks appeared at position #73 on the Japanese Oricon album charts for a week, while Field Tracks appeared at position #75 for that same week.

Battle Tracks
No.	Title	Japanese title (Romanization)	Length
1.	"Opening Theme"	オープニングテーマ (Ōpuningutēma)	6:02
2.	"Beneath Bloodied Banners"	紅蓮の戦旗の下に (Guren no Senki no Shimoni)	5:32
3.	"Nail of the Heavens"	天楔 (Tenkusabi)	3:10
4.	"In the Shadow of the Colossus"	旭影を追いかけ (Kyokkage wo Oikake)	3:26
5.	"The Forest's Pulse"	鳴動 (Meidou)	4:27
6.	"Bathed in Woodsin"	草藪を掻きわけ (Kusayabu wo Kakuwake)	3:01
7.	"Quicksand"	砂塵 (Sajin)	4:41
8.	"Desert Moon Defied"	砂礫を踏みしめ (Sareki wo Fumishime)	3:19
9.	"Victory Fanfare (Full)"	勝利のファンファーレ ~凱歌~ (Shouri no Faanfaare ~Gaika~)	0:58

Field Tracks
No.	Title	Japanese title (Romanization)	Length
1.	"Prelude - Remembrance"	プレリュード ~追憶の煌めき~ (Pureryūdo ~Tsuioku no Kirameki~)	6:01
2.	"Navigator's Glory - The Theme of Limsa Lominsa"	潮風の集う街 ~リムサ・ロミンサのテーマ~ (Shiokaze no Tsudou Machi ~Limsa Lominsa no Tēma~)	5:23
3.	"On Windy Meadows"	ラノシアの疾風 (Ranoshia no Hayate)	5:25
4.	"Born of the Boughs - The Theme of Gridania"	木々のさざめく街 ~グリダニアのテーマ~ (Kigi no Sazameku Machi ~Gridania no Tēma~)	5:32
5.	"Emerald Labyrinth"	黒衣の迷宮 (Hēiyīno mígōng)	4:37
6.	"The Twin Faces of Fate - The Theme of Ul'dah"	運命の交わる街 ~ウルダハのテーマ~ (Unmei no Majiwaru Machi ~Ul'dah no Tēma~)	6:33
7.	"Twilight over Thanalan"	ザナラーンの黄昏 (Thanalan no Tasogare)	4:21
8.	"Aetherial Slumber"	エーテルのまどろみ (Ēteru no Madoromi)	7:13

=== Eorzean Frontiers ===
Final Fantasy XIV - Eorzean Frontiers

Soundtrack album by Nobuo Uematsu, Masayoshi Soken, Naoshi Mizuta, Tsuyoshi Sekito, Ryo Yamazaki
- Released: September 1, 2012
- Genre: Video game soundtrack
- Length: 3:14:24 (iTunes download)

Final Fantasy XIV - Eorzean Frontiers was the first full album of music from the game to be released. It was published by Square Enix on September 1, 2012 as a digital album through iTunes. The tracks include most of the music that had been released for the game at that point, including pieces that were present at the game's launch and some which were added later, including "Rise of the White Raven", the theme for Nael Van Darnus, and the themes for the Grand Companies of Eorzea. All of the tracks from the album were additionally released on the same date in a set of smaller digital mini-albums, also released through iTunes, titled Final Fantasy XIV Frontiers - Gridania, Ishgard, Limsa Lominsa, and Ul'dah. The majority of the music was composed by Nobuo Uematsu, with additional pieces contributed by Masayoshi Soken, Naoshi Mizuta, Tsuyoshi Sekito, and Ryo Yamazaki. The 38 tracks of the album cover a duration of 3:14:24.

Derek Heemsbergen of RPGFan reviewed the album as an "incredibly rich and diverse musical score", and felt that regardless of the reception to the game itself, that the soundtrack was worthy of a Final Fantasy game. Jayson Napolitano of Destructoid, in his review of the album, found that while there were many interesting tracks in the album and that the total length of more than three hours made the album a "good deal", that most of the tracks that he enjoyed the most were previously featured on the Final Fantasy XIV Battle Tracks and Field Tracks mini-albums.

Track list
No.	Title	Writer(s)	Japanese title	Length
1.	"Holy Consult"	Nobuo Uematsu	聖なる助言者	4:53
2.	"Unspoken"	Uematsu	クルザスの静寂	3:45
3.	"Starlight and Sellswords"	Uematsu	桟道を上りて	4:08
4.	"Flightless Wings"	Uematsu	猛き嵐の剣に	4:31
5.	"Fallen Angel"	Masayoshi Soken	墜天せし者	6:42
6.	"Tempest"	Uematsu	戦乱	12:08
7.	"Rise of the White Raven"	Soken	白銀の凶鳥、飛翔せり	5:55
8.	"Born of the Boughs (The Theme of Gridania)"	Uematsu	木々さざめく街 (グリダニアのテーマ)	5:34
9.	"Whisper of the Land"	Uematsu	冥き地の底に	5:30
10.	"Emerald Labyrinth"	Uematsu	黒衣の迷宮	5:18
11.	"Bathed in Woodsin"	Uematsu	草薮を掻きわけ	3:59
12.	"Dewdrops & Moonbeams"	Ryo Yamazaki	露の玉、月の光	3:25
13.	"Good King Moogle Mog XII"	Soken	善王モグル・モグXII世	5:35
14.	"Into the Adder's Den"	Tsuyoshi Sekito	双蛇党統合司令部	6:49
15.	"Seven Jesters"	Soken	七匹の道化たち	6:03
16.	"Navigator's Glory (The Theme of Limsa Lominsa)"	Uematsu	潮風の集う街 (リムサ・ロミンサのテーマ)	5:24
17.	"Freedom"	Soken	自由なる風に吹かれて	5:50
18.	"On Windy Meadows"	Uematsu	ラノシアの疾風	5:20
19.	"In the Shadow of the Colossus"	Uematsu	旭影を追いかけ	4:08
20.	"Horizons Calling"	Uematsu	水平線の彼方	5:10
21.	"Ripples in the Sea"	Yamazaki	洋上の小波	2:21
22.	"Maelstrom Command"	Naoshi Mizuta	黒渦団軍令部	6:17
23.	"The Promise of Plunder"	Soken	隠し財宝を求めて	4:00
24.	"Quick as Silver, Hard as Stone"	Mizuta	疾きこと銀の如く、硬きこと石の如く	7:03
25.	"The Twin Faces of Fate (The Theme of Ul'dah)"	Uematsu	運命の交わる街 (ウルダハのテーマ)	5:51
26.	"Twilight over Thanalan"	Uematsu	ザナラーンの黄昏	4:15
27.	"Widdershins"	Uematsu	深き海の淵に	3:26
28.	"Quicksand"	Uematsu	砂塵	4:32
29.	"Desert Moon Defied"	Uematsu	砂礫を踏みしめ	3:52
30.	"Primal Judgment"	Uematsu	原始の審判	4:38
31.	"Conflagration"	Uematsu	紅き焔の熱に	4:54
32.	"The Sand's Secrets"	Yamazaki	砂の機密	2:59
33.	"The Hall of Flames"	Yamazaki	不滅隊作戦本部	6:17
34.	"Pitfire"	Uematsu	炎獄の火種	2:57
35.	"Tears for Mor Dhouna"	Uematsu	モドゥーナの涙雨	6:53
36.	"Phantoms on the Lake"	Uematsu	幽境	5:36
37.	"Steel Reason"	Uematsu	鋼の理念	4:13
38.	"Imperium"	Uematsu	インペリウム	4:17

=== Before Meteor ===
Before Meteor: Final Fantasy XIV Original Soundtrack

Soundtrack album by Nobuo Uematsu, Masayoshi Soken, Naoshi Mizuta, Tsuyoshi Sekito, Ryo Yamazaki, and Ai Yamashita
- Released: August 14, 2013
- Recorded: 2008–2012
- Genre: Video game soundtrack
- Length: 6:05:51 (Single Blu-ray Disc)

On August 14, 2013, two weeks before the release of A Realm Reborn, Square Enix published Before Meteor: Final Fantasy XIV Original Soundtrack, a full soundtrack album with all of the music composed for the original release of the game, which had shut down a year prior. The 104-track album was released on a single Blu-ray Disc and included music lasting 6:05:51, with both the original music by Uematsu as well as the additional tracks composed by Mizuta, Yamazaki, Sekito, Soken, and Ai Yamashita during the game's run. The disc also included a remastered version of the "A New Beginning" trailer and a bonus download code for an in-game Dalamud Minion. The Blu-ray Disc allowed purchasers to rip digital copies of the album on their Blu-ray devices to play without the disc. Emily McMillan of Video Game Music Online generally praised the music, praising some of the newer tracks and Uematsu's work on the more orchestral tracks. Her main criticisms were that some aspects seemed artificial and that the composers were playing safe with the themes and motifs used. Before Meteor appeared at position #11 on the Japanese Oricon album charts for its release week and remained in the charts for three weeks.

Track list
No.	Title	Writer(s)	Japanese title	Length
1.	"Prelude - Remembrance"	Nobuo Uematsu	プレリュード ～追憶の煌めき～	5:50
2.	"Opening Theme"	Uematsu	オープニングテーマ	5:56
3.	"Navigator’s Glory - The Theme of Limsa Lominsa"	Uematsu	潮風の集う街 ～リムサ・ロミンサのテーマ～	3:56
4.	"Freedom"	Uematsu	自由なる風に吹かれて	5:30
5.	"On Windy Meadows"	Uematsu	ラノシアの疾風	5:18
6.	"Nail of the Heavens"	Uematsu	天楔	3:17
7.	"In the Shadow of the Colossus"	Uematsu	旭影を追いかけ	3:28
8.	"Siren Song"	Masayoshi Soken	セイレーンの呼び声	2:05
9.	"Born of the Boughs - The Theme of Gridania"	Uematsu	木々のさざめく街 ～グリダニアのテーマ～	5:02
10.	"Whisper of the Land"	Uematsu	冥き地の底に	5:28
11.	"Emerald Labyrinth"	Uematsu	黒衣の迷宮	3:33
12.	"The Forest’s Pulse"	Uematsu	鳴動	3:04
13.	"Bathed in Woodsin"	Uematsu	草藪を掻きわけ	3:28
14.	"March of the Moogles"	Soken	モーグリ行進曲	0:44
15.	"The Twin Faces of Fate - The Theme of Ul’dah"	Uematsu	運命の交わる街 ～ウルダハのテーマ～	5:32
16.	"Twilight over Thanalan"	Uematsu	ザナラーンの黄昏	4:12
17.	"Widdershins"	Uematsu	深き海の淵に	3:24
18.	"Quicksand"	Uematsu	砂塵	4:38
19.	"Desert Moon Defied"	Uematsu	砂礫を踏みしめ	3:20
20.	"Unspoken"	Uematsu	クルザスの静寂	3:13
21.	"Pennons Aloft"	Uematsu	槍旗	6:01
22.	"Starlight and Sellswords"	Uematsu	桟道を上りて	3:50
23.	"Tears for Mor Dhona"	Uematsu	モードゥナの涙雨	4:27
24.	"Phantoms on the Lake"	Uematsu	幽境	5:20
25.	"Supply & Demand"	Uematsu	街路の雑踏	1:44
26.	"Behind Closed Doors"	Uematsu	安らぎの部屋	3:28
27.	"Horizons Calling"	Uematsu	地平線の彼方	2:51
28.	"No Quarter"	Uematsu	ノー・クォーター	4:05
29.	"Beneath Bloodied Banners"	Uematsu	紅蓮の戦旗の下に	5:50
30.	"With these Hands"	Uematsu	すべてはこの手から	2:58
31.	"By Design"	Uematsu	バイデザイン	2:20
32.	"Nature's Bounty"	Uematsu	自然の賜物	2:22
33.	"When a Tree Falls"	Uematsu	汗を流して	1:03
34.	"Decisions"	Uematsu	駆け引き	2:30
35.	"Crowning Achievements"	Uematsu	栄光の賛歌	0:11
36.	"Where the Heart Is"	Uematsu	心の故郷	2:33
37.	"Holy Consult"	Uematsu	聖なる助言者	4:39
38.	"Aetherial Slumber"	Uematsu	エーテルのまどろみ	3:18
39.	"The Echo"	Uematsu	追憶の迷路	1:45
40.	"Fever Dream"	Uematsu	前触れ	2:31
41.	"Daring Alliances"	Uematsu	日溜り	1:46
42.	"Sacred Bonds"	Uematsu	哀愁	2:57
43.	"Piece of Mind"	Uematsu	清浄なる心	3:16
44.	"Inner Recess"	Uematsu	焦燥の旅路	1:19
45.	"From the Heart"	Uematsu	帰るべき場所	2:27
46.	"Fourteen Steps"	Uematsu	また、ここから	3:13
47.	"Fragments of Forever"	Uematsu	永遠の欠片	2:22
48.	"Tranquility"	Uematsu	静かなる一刻	2:09
49.	"Neverborn"	Uematsu	疑惑の廻廊	2:08
50.	"Everbinding Oath"	Uematsu	永遠の誓い	2:37
51.	"Heavensturn"	Uematsu	降神祭	4:27
52.	"Moonfire Faire"	Uematsu	紅蓮祭	3:23
53.	"All Saint's Wake"	Uematsu	守護天節	3:15
54.	"Starlight Celebration"	Uematsu	星芒祭	6:05
55.	"Conflagration"	Uematsu	紅き焔の熱に	5:02
56.	"The Hero of Hatchingside"	Soken	エッグハントの英雄	0:07
57.	"Enraptured"	Uematsu	淡き光の夢に	4:02
58.	"Battle Drums"	Uematsu	蛮勇	4:02
59.	"Bo-down"	Uematsu	レンタル de チョコボ	2:53
60.	"Fury"	Uematsu	憤怒	5:18
61.	"The Seventh Gate"	Uematsu	試練の戦い	5:40
62.	"Victory Fanfare (Short)"	Uematsu	勝利のファンファーレ ～凱歌～ (ショート)	0:11
63.	"Without Shadow"	Uematsu	忍び寄る闇	3:08
64.	"Canticle"	Ai Yamashita	祈りの歌	1:19
65.	"Wrath of the Eikons"	Uematsu	怒れる神々	3:51
66.	"Primal Judgment"	Uematsu	原始の審判	5:07
67.	"Final Respite"	Uematsu	夢はいまも……	3:31
68.	"The Dark's Embrace"	Uematsu	闇の抱擁	3:32
69.	"The Dark's Kiss"	Uematsu	闇の口付	3:28
70.	"Nemesis"	Uematsu	ネメシス	4:53
71.	"Victory Fanfare (Full)"	Uematsu	勝利のファンファーレ ～凱歌～ (ロング)	0:40
72.	"Maelstrom Command"	Naoshi Mizuta	黒渦団軍令部	5:50
73.	"Into the Adder's Den"	Tsuyoshi Sekito	双蛇党統合司令部	4:11
74.	"The Hall of Flames"	Ryo Yamazaki	不滅隊作戦本部	4:33
75.	"Honor and Duty"	Soken	名誉と義務	0:08
76.	"Eorzea de Chocobo"	Soken	エオルゼア de チョコボ	4:24
77.	"Ripples in the Sea"	Yamazaki	洋上の小波	1:15
78.	"The Sand’s Secrets"	Yamazaki	砂の機密	1:30
79.	"Dewdrops & Moonbeams"	Yamazaki	露の玉、月の光	1:44
80.	"Dreams Aloft"	Yamazaki	夢見るは遙かなる空	1:20
81.	"Airborne"	Soken	大空へ	0:29
82.	"Birds of a Feather"	Soken	キャラバン護衛	1:25
83.	"Flee Together"	Soken	とんずら！	1:52
84.	"Quick as Silver, Hard as Stone"	Mizuta	疾きこと銀の如く、硬きこと石の如く	5:00
85.	"Flightless Wings"	Uematsu	猛き嵐の剣に	4:14
86.	"Pitfire"	Uematsu	炎獄の火種	2:56
87.	"The Promise of Plunder"	Soken	隠し財宝を求めて	3:49
88.	"Meteor"	Yamazaki	メテオ	4:06
89.	"Seven Jesters"	Soken	七匹の道化たち	3:02
90.	"Good King Moogle Mog XII"	Soken	善王モグル・モグXII世	5:38
91.	"The Rider's Boon"	Sekito	その背に揺られて（そのせにゆられて	3:20
92.	"Breaking Boundaries"	Soken	極限を超えて	3:20
93.	"Relics"	Soken	古のジョブ	1:58
94.	"In the Arms of Althyk"	Soken	時神に誘われて	0:11
95.	"Agent of Inquiry"	Soken	事件屋のアレ	2:43
96.	"The Tug of Fate"	Soken	運命の導き	4:30
97.	"To the Fore"	Soken	全隊前へ！	6:32
98.	"Imperial Will"	Uematsu	帝国の意志	5:09
99.	"Steel Reason"	Uematsu	鋼の理念	4:17
100.	"Imperium"	Uematsu	インペリウム	6:28
101.	"Fallen Angel"	Soken	堕天せし者	7:09
102.	"Tempest"	Uematsu	戦乱	7:51
103.	"Rise of the White Raven"	Soken	白銀の凶鳥、飛翔せり	5:51
104.	"Answers"	Uematsu	Answers	7:09

== A Realm Reborn ==
=== Original soundtrack ===
Final Fantasy XIV: A Realm Reborn Original Soundtrack

Soundtrack album by Masayoshi Soken, Nobuo Uematsu, Tsuyoshi Sekito, Naoshi Mizuta
- Released: March 26, 2014
- Genre: Video game soundtrack
- Length: 6:48:00 (Single Blu-ray Disc)

Final Fantasy XIV: A Realm Reborn Original Soundtrack was released by Square Enix on March 21, 2014. It was released on a Blu-ray Disc and features 119 tracks lasting 6:48:00, composed by numerous artists, including Nobuo Uematsu, Masayoshi Soken, Naoshi Mizuta, and Tsuyoshi Sekito. In addition to the tracks present in the initial launch of A Realm Reborn, the album also includes tracks used in the 2.1 patch, A Realm Awoken. Initial copies of the soundtrack also came with a special "Wind-up Bahamut" in-game pet. Soken contributed to composing, compiling, and remixing all of the music of the game, which includes traditional Final Fantasy themes composed originally by Uematsu, as well as sound effects, in only eight months. Emily McMillan of Video Game Music Online, in her review of the album, termed it a "truly fantastic score", and said that it was superior to the music of the original version of the game. She felt that it was an excellent merging of the traditional Final Fantasy musical style with a modern orchestral score. Mike Salbato of RPGFan also praised the album saying that it was his favorite soundtrack album of 2014, and that he "can't recommend A Realm Reborn's soundtrack highly enough".

In addition to reviews of the album, within the context of the game the music has been well received. Kotaku's Mike Fahey stated that the music was "wonderful, complex and satisfying". He often paused to remove the ambient and interface noises so as to hear it better. GamesRadar's Adam Harshberger called it "a standout even amongst Final Fantasy's storied heritage", while Digital Spy's Mark Langshaw called it "a sonic feast ... that pays appropriate homage to the long-running RPG series". The soundtrack won Video Game Music Online's 2013 Annual Game Music Awards in the Eastern category. A Realm Reborn appeared at position #10 on the Japanese Oricon album charts for its release week, and remained in the charts for eight weeks, selling over 21,900 copies.

Track list
No.	Title	Writer(s)	Japanese title (Romanization)	Length
1.	"Prelude – Rebirth"	Masayoshi Soken	プレリュード ～再誕の煌めき～ (Prelude ~Saitan no Kirameki~)	1:16
2.	"Torn from the Heavens"	Soken	天より降りし力 (Ten yori Kudarishi Chikara)	5:11
3.	"Prelude – Discoveries"	Soken	プレリュード ～冒険の序章～ (Prelude ~Bouken no Joshou~)	10:30
4.	"A New Hope"	Soken	希望の都 (Kibou no Miyako)	11:24
5.	"To the Sun"	Soken	灼熱の地へ (Shakunetsu no Chi e)	6:34
6.	"The Land Burns"	Soken	荒野の鼓動 (Kouya no Kodou)	3:04
7.	"The Gift of Life"	Soken	生命の賜物 (Seimei no Tamamono)	1:07
8.	"Another Round"	Soken	もう一杯！ (Mou Ippai!)	2:16
9.	"Hard to Miss"	Soken	宿命 (Shukumei)	4:12
10.	"Bo-down"	Nobuo Uematsu	レンタル de チョコボ (Rental de Chocobo)	1:57
11.	"Sultana Dreaming"	Soken	夢見る女王陛下 (Yume Miru Jou'ou Heika)	7:05
12.	"Bliss"	Soken, Nobuko Toda, Yoshitaka Suzuki	無常の喜び (Mujou no Yorokobi)	1:56
13.	"Fracture"	Soken	不穏な気配 (Fuon na Kehai)	1:25
14.	"Tenacity"	Soken, Toda, Suzuki	不屈の闘志 (Fukutsu no Toushi)	5:05
15.	"Return of the Hero"	Soken, Toda, Suzuki	英雄の凱旋 (Eiyuu no Gaisen)	2:16
16.	"A World Apart"	Soken	そして世界へ (Soshite Sekai e)	3:38
17.	"I Am the Sea"	Soken	偉大なる母港 (Idai naru Bokou)	13:58
18.	"On Westerly Winds"	Soken	西風に乗せて (Nishikaze ni Nosete)	5:19
19.	"The Land Breathes"	Soken	大地の鼓動 (Daichi no Kodou)	3:04
20.	"Saltswept"	Soken	潮風香る街 (Shiokaze Kaoru Machi)	1:49
21.	"Ruby Moonrise"	Soken	爆ぜよ耐熱装備 (Hazeyo Tainetsu Soubi)	2:19
22.	"Eorzea de Chocobo"	Soken	エオルゼア de チョコボ (Eorzea de Chocobo)	2:33
23.	"A Sailor Never Sleeps"	Soken	船乗りは眠らない (Funanori wa Nemuranai)	7:45
24.	"Currents"	Soken	潮流 (Chouryuu)	0:51
25.	"Brothers in Arms"	Soken, Toda, Suzuki	戦友 (Senyuu)	6:31
26.	"Wailers And Waterwheels"	Soken	水車の調べ (Suisha no Shirabe)	11:26
27.	"Serenity"	Soken	静穏の森 (Seion no Mori)	5:52
28.	"The Land Bends"	Soken	森の鼓動 (Mori no Kodou)	2:49
29.	"Reign of Pain"	Naoshi Mizuta	黒き悪魔 (Kuroki Akuma)	2:01
30.	"The Rider's Boon"	Tsuyoshi Sekito	その背に揺られて (Sono Se ni Yurarete)	3:18
31.	"Dance of the Fireflies"	Soken	蛍たちの舞踏会 (Hotaru-tachi no Butoukai)	4:24
32.	"Greenwrath"	Soken	精霊の意思 (Seirei no Ishi)	1:23
33.	"From the Depths"	Soken	仄暗い底から (Honogurai Soko kara)	1:34
34.	"The Promise of Plunder"	Soken	隠し財宝を求めて (Kakushi Zaihou wo Motomete)	3:48
35.	"Slumber Disturbed"	Soken	妨げられた眠り (Samatagerareta Nemuri)	1:14
36.	"A Fine Death"	Soken	名誉に賭けて (Meiyo ni Kakete)	3:11
37.	"Below"	Soken	地下坑道 (Chika Koudou)	1:36
38.	"Nemesis"	Uematsu	ネメシス (Nemesis)	4:52
39.	"A Victory Fanfare Reborn (Full)"	Soken	勝利のファンファーレ ～新生（フル）～ (Shouri no Fanfare ~Shinshou (Full)~)	1:41
40.	"The Waking Sands"	Soken	砂の家 (Suna no Ie)	4:10
41.	"Smoulder"	Soken	燻る灰 (Iburu Hai)	1:29
42.	"Pitfire"	Uematsu	炎獄の火種 (Engoku no Hidane)	1:56
43.	"One Blood"	Toda, Suzuki	血脈 (Ketsumyaku)	1:56
44.	"Primal Judgement"	Uematsu	原始の審判 (Genshi no Shinpan)	3:05
45.	"Calling"	Soken	星の囁き (Hoshi no Sasayaki)	0:36
46.	"Where the Heart Is"	Soken	心温まる場所 (Kokoro Atatamaru Basho)	2:39
47.	"Where the Hearth Is"	Soken	体暖まる場所 (Karada Atatamaru Basho)	5:21
48.	"Battle Theme 1.x"	Soken	戦闘シーン1.X (Sentou Scene 1.X)	3:30
49.	"Conundrum"	Soken, Toda, Suzuki	堂々巡り (Doudoumeguri)	2:07
50.	"Agent of Inquiry"	Soken	事件屋のアレ (Jikenya no Are)	1:44
51.	"The Ludus"	Soken	闘士の修練所 (Doushi no Shuurensho)	1:25
52.	"Flibbertigibbet"	Soken	イタズラっ子たち (Itazurakko-tachi)	1:46
53.	"A Curious Breed of Botherment"	Soken	世にも奇妙な厄介者 (Yo ni mo Kimyou na Yakkaimono)	1:54
54.	"A Thousand Screams"	Soken	千の悲鳴 (Sen no Himei)	0:58
55.	"My Soul to Keep"	Soken	我が魂を捧げて (Waga Tamashii wo Sasagete)	2:08
56.	"From Fear to Fortitude"	Soken, Toda, Suzuki	豪勇の士 (Gouyuu no Shi)	4:21
57.	"The Maiden's Lament"	Soken	乙女の哀歌 (Otome no Aika)	1:20
58.	"Ruby Sunrise"	Soken	輝く太陽(Kagayaku Taiyou)	3:57
59.	"Lipflaps on Longstops"	Soken	野営地のお調子者 (Yaeichi no Ochoushimono)	1:08
60.	"Echoes of Ages Past"	Soken	昔日の残響 (Sekijitsu no Zankyou)	0:55
61.	"Abomination"	Soken	憎悪 (Zou'o)	1:02
62.	"Quick as Silver, Hard as Stone"	Mizuta	疾きこと銀の如く、硬きこと石の如く (Tsuki koto Kane no Shiku, Kouki koto Ishi no Shiku)	2:30
63.	"Weight of a Whisper"	Soken	タイタンの慟哭 (Titan no Doukoku)	1:40
64.	"Weight of His Will"	Soken	タイタンの憤怒 (Titan no Funne)	2:52
65.	"Weight of the World"	Soken	タイタンの激震 (Titan no Gekishin)	1:35
66.	"Heartless"	Soken	タイタンの心核 (Titan no Shisane)	2:16
67.	"Under the Weight"	Soken	過重圧殺！ ～蛮神タイタン討滅戦～ (Kajou Assatsu! ~Banshin Titan Toumetsusen~)	11:34
68.	"Forever Lost"	Soken	永遠の離別 (Eien no Ribetsu)	2:58
69.	"Fealty"	Soken	忠義 (Chuugi)	3:33
70.	"Undying Faith"	Soken	鋼の信仰 (Hagane no Shinkou)	0:55
71.	"The Land Breaks"	Soken	雪山の鼓動 (Setsuzan no Kodou)	3:19
72.	"The Dragon's Dirge"	Soken	竜の葬送歌 (Ryuu no Sousouka)	1:01
73.	"Cold Salvation"	Soken	極寒戦線 (Gokkan Sensen)	1:02
74.	"The Darkhold"	Soken	ゼーメル要塞 (Dzemael Yousai)	1:12
75.	"Miser's Folly"	Soken	守銭奴の愚行 (Shuusendo no Gukou)	1:09
76.	"Thunderer"	Soken	雷鳴 (Raimei)	5:04
77.	"Kiss of Chaos"	Soken	混沌の予感 (Konton no Yokan)	1:43
78.	"Flightless Wings"	Uematsu	猛き嵐の剣に (Mouki Arashi no Ken ni)	2:35
79.	"Fleeting Rays"	Soken	儚き光彩 (Hakanaki Kousai)	1:37
80.	"Engage"	Soken	蒼き翼 (Aoki Tsubasa)	3:36
81.	"Damnation"	Soken	破滅 (Hametsu)	1:03
82.	"Fallen Angel"	Soken	堕天せし者 (Datenseshi mono)	4:30
83.	"Frontiers Within"	Soken	フロンティア (Frontier)	3:25
84.	"Reflections"	Soken	リフレクション (Reflection)	2:08
85.	"Intertwined"	Soken	交錯 (Kousaku)	3:32
86.	"The Land Bleeds"	Soken	水晶の鼓動 (Suishou no Kodou)	3:05
87.	"Crystal Rain"	Soken	クリスタルの雨 (Crystal no Ame)	0:55
88.	"Through the Gloom"	Soken	薄闇に射す光 (Usuyami ni Sasu Hikari)	1:53
89.	"Slither"	Soken	五里霧中 (Gorimuchuu)	0:23
90.	"Good King Moggle Mog XII"	Soken	善王モグル・モグXII世 (Zennou Moggle Mog XII)	3:13
91.	"A Tonberry's Tears"	Soken	トンベリの涙 (Tonberry no Namida)	1:04
92.	"A Fell Air Falleth"	Soken	戦士の直感 (Senshi no Chokkan)	2:55
93.	"Cracks in the Wall"	Soken	古城にて…… (Kojou nite......)	1:15
94.	"Skullduggery"	Soken	奸計 (Kankei)	2:13
95.	"Breaking Boundaries"	Soken	極限を超えて (Kyokugen wo Koete)	1:59
96.	"The Dark's Embrace"	Uematsu	闇の抱擁 (Yami no Houyou)	2:00
97.	"The Dark's Kiss"	Uematsu	闇の口付 (Yami no Kuchizuke)	2:02
98.	"Hubris"	Soken, Toda, Suzuki	傲慢 (Gouman)	5:52
99.	"Ever Upwards"	Soken, Toda, Suzuki	天上へ (Tenjou e)	6:00
100.	"Tumbling Down"	Soken, Toda, Suzuki	奈落へ (Naraku e)	6:46
101.	"Defender of the Realm"	Soken, Toda, Suzuki	エオルゼアの守護者 (Eorzea no Shugosha)	2:20
102.	"Machinations"	Soken	軍議 (Gungi)	1:28
103.	"Discordance"	Soken	不調和 (Fuchouwa)	0:21
104.	"The Emperor's Wont"	Soken	魔導の軍勢 (Madou no Gunzei)	8:26
105.	"Beyond the Unknown"	Soken	未知の領域へ (Michi no Ryouiki)	0:13
106.	"The Only Path"	Soken	ただひとつの道 (Tada Hitotsu no Michi)	0:59
107.	"Penitus"	Soken	魔導城プラエトリウム (Madoujou Praetorium)	14:18
108.	"Bite of the Black Wolf"	Soken	漆黒の王狼、咆吼せり (Shikkoku no Oukami, Houkou seri)	4:36
109.	"The Maker's Ruin"	Soken	神なき世界 (Kami naki Sekai)	2:51
110.	"Ultima"	Soken	究極幻想 (Kyuukyoku Gensou)	7:10
111.	"Serving the Light"	Soken	光の加護 (Hikari no Kago)	1:04
112.	"Flight"	Soken	終局 (Shuukyoku)	1:15
113.	"The Seventh Sun"	Soken	第七星暦 (Dai-nana Hoshireki)	5:00
114.	"Dawn of a New Era"	Soken	新時代の暁 (Sjinjidai no Akatsuki)	1:07
115.	"And You! – A Realm Reborn Medley"	Soken	And You! ～新生エオルゼアメドレー～ (And You! ~Shinshou Eorzea Medley~)	2:40
116.	"The Corpse Hall"	Soken	斬 (Zan)	10:50
117.	"Primal Timbre"	Soken	真実を求めて (Shinjitsu wo Motomete)	6:31
118.	"Spiral"	Soken	螺旋 (Rasen)	6:54
119.	"Calamity Unbound"	Soken	試練を超える力 (Shiren wo Koeru Chikara)	8:08
120.	"Battle on the Big Bridge (hidden track)"	Uematsu, Soken	ビッグブリッヂの死闘 ～新生～ Mortal Combat on the Big Bridge ~Reborn~	4:24

=== From Astral to Umbral ===
Final Fantasy XIV: From Astral to Umbral - Band & Piano Arrangement Album

Soundtrack album by Masayoshi Soken
- Released: December 17, 2014
- Genre: Video game soundtrack
- Length: 1:06:34

Final Fantasy XIV: From Astral to Umbral - Band & Piano Arrangement Album is a Blu-ray album of rock and piano arrangements of music from A Realm Reborn. It features arrangements by Soken, GUNN, Keiko, and Nobuko Toda of pieces originally composed by Soken for the game, and was published by Square Enix on December 17, 2014. The first six tracks on the album are piano covers, performed by Keiko, of field and town themes from the game. The following six are rock covers by Soken's band The Primals of the musical themes from the game of the primals, powerful elemental creatures. The Blu-ray Disc also features the original versions of the twelve tracks, videos of in-game scenes where the original music plays, as well as one secret track that needs a password to unlock. Some of the original tracks had not yet been released on an official album when Astral to Umbral was produced. In picking tracks to arrange for this album, Soken wanted to highlight the contrast between the two sides. He chose pieces that he originally composed on piano for the piano selections and on guitar for the rock selections.

Mike Salbato of RPGFan reviewed the album and described it as "a great, if perhaps disjointed experience". He praised the high quality of the arrangements and performances, but questioned the grouping of the more gentle piano tracks alongside the heavy rock pieces.

Track list
No.	Title	Writer(s)	Japanese title (Romanization)	Length
1.	"Piano: Serenity"	KEIKO/Nobuko Tode	静穏の森 ～黒衣森フィールド～ (Seion no mori ~ kokui mori fīrudo ~)	6:14
2.	"Piano: Wailers And Waterwheels"	KEIKO/Nobuko Tode	水車の調べ 〜グリダニア〜 (Suisha no shirabe 〜 guridania 〜)	6:01
3.	"Piano: To the Sun"	KEIKO/Nobuko Tode	灼熱の地へ 〜ザナラーンフィールド〜 (Shakunetsu no ji e 〜 zanarānfīrudo 〜)	7:19
4.	"Piano: A New Hope"	KEIKO/Nobuko Tode	希望の都 〜ウルダハ〜 (Kibō no miyako 〜 urudaha 〜)	6:52
5.	"Piano: On Westerly Winds"	KEIKO/Nobuko Tode	西風に乗せて 〜ラノシアフィールド〜 (Seifū ni nosete 〜 ranoshiafīrudo 〜)	5:50
6.	"I Am the Sea"	KEIKO/Nobuko Tode	偉大なる母港 〜リムサ・ロミンサ〜 (Idainaru bokō 〜 rimusa rominsa 〜)	8:57
7.	"Band: Primal Judgment"	Masayoshi Soken/GUNN/THE PRIMALS	原始の審判 〜蛮神イフリート討伐戦〜 (Genshi no shinpan 〜 Ban-shin ifurīto tōbatsu-sen 〜)	2:52
8.	"Band: Under the Weight"	Masayoshi Soken/GUNN/THE PRIMALS	過重圧殺！ 〜蛮神タイタン討伐戦〜 (Kajū assatsu! 〜 Ban Kami Tai Tan tōbatsu-sen 〜)	5:15
9.	"Band: Fallen Angel"	Masayoshi Soken/GUNN/THE PRIMALS	堕天せし者 〜蛮神ガルーダ討伐戦〜 (Daten seshi mono 〜 Ban-shin garūda tōbatsu-sen 〜)	4:12
10.	"Band: Through the Maelstrom"	Masayoshi Soken/GUNN/THE PRIMALS	混沌の渦動 〜蛮神リヴァイアサン討滅戦〜 (Konton no kadō 〜 Ban-shin rivu~aiasan tōmetsu-sen 〜)	4:17
11.	"Band: Thunder Rolls"	Masayoshi Soken/GUNN/THE PRIMALS	雷光雷鳴 〜蛮神ラムウ討滅戦〜 (Raikō raimei 〜 Ban-shin ramū tōmetsu-sen 〜)	4:44
12.	"Band: Oblivion"	Masayoshi Soken/GUNN/THE PRIMALS	忘却の彼方 〜蛮神シヴァ討滅戦〜 (Bōkyaku no kanata 〜 Ban-shin shivu~a tōmetsu-sen 〜)	4:00

=== Before the Fall ===
Before the Fall: Final Fantasy XIV Original Soundtrack

Soundtrack album by Masayoshi Soken
- Released: August 26, 2015
- Genre: Video game soundtrack
- Length: 4:12:41

Before the Fall: Final Fantasy XIV Original Soundtrack is an album of music from four patches to Final Fantasy XIV: A Realm Reborn. These were patches 2.2 through 2.5: "Through the Maelstrom", "Defenders of Eorzea", "Dreams of Ice", and "Before the Fall". The album was released by Square Enix on August 26, 2015 on Blu-ray, and includes all of the music that Soken composed for the updates, as well as several pieces for the updates written by Nobuo Uematsu, Naoshi Mizuta, and Ryo Yamazaki. Of the 61 tracks, 16 were previously released on other albums, primarily the Before Meteor album, and these tracks compose the majority of the non-Soken tracks. It sold around 14,500 copies.

Christopher Huynh of Video Game Music Online held a mixed opinion of the album, which he criticized as "a rather mixed bag of tracks". He said that while some of the tracks were excellent, there were several poor pieces as well, and was disappointed in the repeated material. He ascribed the uneven quality of the album to a lack of an overriding theme to the music, which left it as a collection of disparate material. He also criticized the sound quality, believing that the use of a real orchestra would have helped the orchestral pieces.

Track list
No.	Title	Writer(s)	Japanese title (Romanization)	Length
1.	"Wreck to the Seaman"	Masayoshi Soken	船乗りには難破を ～蛮神リヴァイアサン前哨戦～ (Funanori ni wa nanpa o ~ Ban-shin rivu~aiasan zenshōsen ~)	2:00
2.	"Through the Maelstrom"	Masayoshi Soken	混沌の渦動 〜蛮神リヴァイアサン討滅戦〜 (Konton no kadō 〜 Ban-shin rivu~aiasan tōmetsu-sen 〜)	7:29
3.	"The Scars of Battle"	Masayoshi Soken	魔大戦の傷跡 ～腐敗遺跡 古アムダプール市街～ (Ma taisen no kizuato ~ fuhai iseki ko amudapūru shigai ~)	4:48
4.	"Persistence"	Nobuo Uematsu	不屈の挑戦 (Fukutsu no chōsen)	1:37
5.	"Wrath of the Eikons"	Nobuo Uematsu	怒れる神々 (Okoreru kamigami)	2:35
6.	"Breathless"	Nobuo Uematsu	ノォヴ一味 (No~ovu ichimi)	2:20
7.	"Gluppity-schlopp"	Naoshi Mizuta	クズテツどもの歌 (Kuzutetsu-domo no uta)	1:41
8.	"Fury"	Nobuo Uematsu	憤怒 ～盟友支援 ブレイフロクスの野営地～ (Fundo ~ meiyū shien bureifurokusu no yaei-chi ~)	2:36
9.	"Pa-Paya"	Masayoshi Soken	パーパや (Pa-Paya)	4:40
10.	"Birds of a Feather"	Masayoshi Soken	キャラバン護衛 ～剣闘領域 ハラタリ修練所～ (Kyaraban goei ~ ken 闘領-Iki haratari shūren-sho ~)	1:20
11.	"Beneath Bloodied Banners"	Nobuo Uematsu	紅蓮の戦旗の下に ～剣闘領域 ハラタリ修練所～ (Guren no senki no shita ni ~ ken 闘領-Iki haratari shūren-sho ~)	2:52
12.	"Big-boned"	Masayoshi Soken	でぶチョコボ騎乗 (Debu chokobo kijō)	2:34
13.	"Battle on the Big Bridge"	Nobuo Uematsu	ビッグブリッヂの死闘 ～新生～ (Bigguburiddjinoshitō ~ Shinsei ~)	4:26
14.	"Through the Maelstrom (Female Vocals)"	Masayoshi Soken	混沌の渦動 〜蛮神リヴァイアサン討滅戦：女性版〜 (Konton no kadō 〜 Ban-shin rivu~aiasan tōmetsu-sen: Josei-ban 〜)	7:29
15.	"Meteor"	Ryo Yamazaki	メテオ (Meteo)	2:16
16.	"Blades"	Masayoshi Soken	剣と剣 ～大迷宮 バハムート侵攻編～ (Ken to ken ~ dai meikyū bahamūto shinkō-hen ~)	6:10
17.	"Tempest"	Nobuo Uematsu	戦乱 (Senran)	6:16
18.	"Rise of the White Raven"	Masayoshi Soken	白銀の凶鳥、飛翔せり (Shirogane no kyō tori, hishō seri)	3:05
19.	"Horizons Calling"	Nobuo Uematsu	地平線の彼方 ～財宝伝説 ハルブレーカー・アイル～ (Chiheisen no kanata ~ zaihō densetsu haruburēkā airu ~)	3:07
20.	"Far from Home"	Nobuo Uematsu	何よりも高く (Naniyori mo takaku)	1:42
21.	"Dark Vows"	Masayoshi Soken	漆黒の誓い ～惨劇霊殿 タムタラの墓所～ (Shikkoku no chikai ~ sangeki reiden tamutara no bosho ~)	4:36
22.	"Answers - Reprise"	Nobuo Uematsu	Answers - Reprise (Answers - Reprise)	1:57
23.	"Thunder Rolls"	Masayoshi Soken	雷光雷鳴 〜蛮神ラムウ討滅戦〜 (Raikō raimei 〜 Ban-shin ramū tōmetsu-sen 〜)	10:38
24.	"Moonfire Faire"	Nobuo Uematsu	紅蓮祭 (Guren-sai)	2:04
25.	"Thicker than a Knife"s Blade"	Masayoshi Soken	刃、厚いほどに (Ha, atsui hodo ni)	2:08
26.	"The War Room"		作戦会議室 (Sakusen kaigijitsu)	4:02
27.	"Rouse Out!"	Masayoshi Soken	総員抜剣！ (Sōin bakken!)	2:51
28.	"Blood for Blood"	Masayoshi Soken	血で血を洗って (Chi de chi o aratte)	3:28
29.	"Or the Egg?"	Masayoshi Soken	卵が先か？ (Tamago ga saki ka?)	0:19
30.	"Game Theory"	Masayoshi Soken	ゲーム理論 (Gēmu riron)	2:39
31.	"Now I Know the Truth"	Nobuo Uematsu	ドーガとウネの心 (Dōga to Une no kokoro)	2:05
32.	"Out of the Labyrinth"	Masayoshi Soken	絢爛 ～クリスタルタワー：シルクスの塔～ ( Kenran ~ kurisutarutawā: Shirukusu no tō ~)	5:19
33.	"Shattered"	Masayoshi Soken	破砕 ～クリスタルタワー：シルクスの塔～ (Hasai ~ kurisutarutawā: Shirukusu no tō ~)	5:19
34.	"Loss of Time"	Masayoshi Soken	時はこぼれ落ちて (Toki wa koboreochite)	1:41
35.	"His Holiness"	Masayoshi Soken	教皇 (Kyōkō)	1:09
36.	"A Light in the Storm"	Masayoshi Soken	嵐の中の灯火 ～怪鳥巨塔 シリウス大灯台～ (Arashi no naka no tomoshibi ~ kaichō kyotō Shiriusu dai tōdai ~)	8:08
37.	"Riptide"	Masayoshi Soken	潮衝 ～逆襲要害 サスタシャ浸食洞～ (Shio 衝 ~ Gyakushū yōgai sasutasha shinshoku hora ~)	6:59
38.	"The Edge"	Masayoshi Soken	忍びの刃 (Shinobi no ha)	2:07
39.	"Forgotten by the Sun"	Masayoshi Soken	落日の遺跡 ～遺跡救援 カルン埋没寺院～ (Rakujitsu no iseki ~ iseki kyūen karun maibotsu jiin ~)	6:54
40.	"Pennons Aloft"	Nobuo Uematsu	槍旗 (Yari hata)	3:58
41.	"The Warrens"	Masayoshi Soken	秘密坑道 ～氷結潜窟 スノークローク大氷壁～ (Himitsu kōdō ~ hyōketsu sen 窟 Sunōkurōku dai hyōheki ~)	7:15
42.	"Footsteps in the Snow"	Masayoshi Soken	雪上の足跡 ～蛮神シヴァ前哨戦～ (Setsujō no ashiato ~ Ban-shin shivu~a zenshōsen ~)	7:00
43.	"Oblivion"	Masayoshi Soken	忘却の彼方 〜蛮神シヴァ討滅戦〜 (Bōkyaku no kanata 〜 Ban-shin shivu~a tōmetsu-sen 〜)	8:00
44.	"Everbinding Oath"	Nobuo Uematsu	永遠の誓い (Eien'nochikai)	5:11
45.	"From the Ashes"	Masayoshi Soken	灰より生まれし者 (Hai yori umareshi mono)	6:26
46.	"The Coil Tightens"	Masayoshi Soken	侵攻 (Shinkō)	1:24
47.	"Four-sided Circle"	Nobuo Uematsu	マンダヴィル・ゴールドソーサー (Mandavu~iru gōrudosōsā)	4:11
48.	"Gateway to Paradise"	Nobuo Uematsu	天国の扉 (Tengoku no tobira)	3:59
49.	"Sport of Kings"	Nobuo Uematsu	チョコボレース (Chokoborēsu)	2:43
50.	"Aftermath"	Masayoshi Soken	戦禍 ～邪念排撃 古城アムダプール～ (Senka ~ janen haigeki kojō amudapūru ~)	6:24
51.	"Tricksome"	Masayoshi Soken	聖域の罠 ～武装聖域 ワンダラーパレス～ (Seiiki no wana ~ busō seiiki wandarāparesu ~)	6:03
52.	"Magiteknical Difficulties"	Nobuo Uematsu	魔導仕掛けの友 (Madō shikake no tomo)	3:38
53.	"Blind to the Dark"	Masayoshi Soken	薄闇 ～クリスタルタワー：闇の世界～ (Usuyami ~ kurisutarutawā: Yami no sekai ~)	5:20
54.	"Hamartomania"	Masayoshi Soken	暗闇 ～クリスタルタワー：闇の世界～ (Kurayami ~ kurisutarutawā: Yami no sekai ~)	5:09
55.	"Hunger"	Nobuo Uematsu	死闘の序曲 (Shitō no jokyoku)	0:38
56.	"The Reach of Darkness"	Masayoshi Soken	最後の死闘 ～新生～ (Saigo no shitō ~ Shinsei ~)	4:28
57.	"Eternal Wind"	Nobuo Uematsu	悠久の風 ～新生～ (Yūkyū no kaze ~ Shinsei ~)	2:39
58.	"Faith in Her Fury"	Masayoshi Soken	戦神の教義 ～皇都イシュガルド防衛戦～(Ikusagami no kyōgi ~ sumeragi-to ishugarudo bōei-sen ~)	8:29
59.	"Unworthy"	Masayoshi Soken	仇敵 ～皇都イシュガルド防衛戦～ (Kyūteki ~ sumeragi-to ishugarudo bōei-sen ~)	2:23
60.	"Silver Tears"	Masayoshi Soken	銀の涙 ～幻龍残骸 黙約の塔～ (Gin no namida ~ maboroshi ryū zangai mokuyaku no tō ~)	4:58
61.	"Primogenitor"	Masayoshi Soken	始祖たる幻龍 (Shisotaru maboroshi ryū)	7:34

== Heavensward ==
Heavensward: Final Fantasy XIV Original Soundtrack

Soundtrack album by Masayoshi Soken
- Released: February 24, 2016
- Genre: Video game soundtrack
- Length: 4:43:54

Heavensward: Final Fantasy XIV Original Soundtrack is an album of music for the Heavensward expansion pack to A Realm Reborn. The album was released by Square Enix on February 24, 2016 on Blu-ray, and includes all of the music that Soken composed for the expansion and the 3.1 patch "As Goes Light, So Goes Darkness". A few of the 58 tracks on the album were composed by Yukiko Takada or Nobuo Uematsu, and the majority by Soken. Unlike the prior Before the Fall album, all of the music was new to the album, though 16 of the tracks were previously released in September through November 2015 as Final Fantasy XIV: Heavensward -EP- Vol. 1. through 3. It sold over 10,600 copies.

The album was well received by Emily McMillan of Video Game Music Online, who lauded the soundtrack's "brilliant, varied, and extraordinarily fun to hear" themes. She praised the unique atmosphere of the new expansion's music, as well as its integration into the overall game's soundscape. It was also well received by Mike Salbato of RPGFan, who claimed that in the soundtrack, "Uematsu, Soken and co. really got a chance to shine musically". He listed "Dragonsong" and "Heavensward" as the "backbone" of the album, as their themes were prevalent in many other pieces in the soundtrack.

Track list
No.	Title	Writer(s)	Japanese title (Romanization)	Length
1.	"Heavensward"	Masayoshi Soken	Heavensward	4:19
2.	"A Cold Wind"	Masayoshi Soken	雪風 (Yukikaze)	1:44
3.	"Solid"	Masayoshi Soken	堅牢 ～イシュガルド下層：昼～ (Kenrō ~ ishugarudo kasō: Hiru ~)	13:22
4.	"Against the Wind"	Masayoshi Soken	風に向かって ～クルザス西部高地：昼～ (Kaze ni mukatte ~ kuruzasu seibu kōchi: Hiru ~)	2:09
5.	"Melt"	Masayoshi Soken	熱戦 ～イシュガルド地方：戦闘～ (Nessen ~ ishugarudo chihō: Sentō ~)	3:17
6.	"Descent"	Masayoshi Soken	堕落 ～廃砦捜索 ダスクヴィジル～ (Daraku ~ hai toride sōsaku dasukuvu~ijiru ~)	4:57
7.	"Ominous Prognisticks"	Masayoshi Soken	不吉なる前兆 (Fukitsunaru zenchō)	4:14
8.	"Black and White"	Masayoshi Soken	黒闇と白雪 ～クルザス西部高地：夜～ (Kuroyami to shira yuki ~ kuruzasu seibu kōchi: Yoru ~)	2:18
9.	"Nobility Sleeps"	Masayoshi Soken	ノブレス・スリープス ～イシュガルド上層：夜～ (Noburesu surīpusu ~ ishugarudo jōsō: Yoru ~)	10:31
10.	"Borderless"	Masayoshi Soken	国境なき空 (Kokkyō naki sora)	6:43
11.	"Shelter"	Masayoshi Soken	旅の宿 (Tabi no yado)	1:08
12.	"Lost in the Clouds"	Masayoshi Soken	雲に隠れて ～アバラシア雲海：昼～ (Kumo ni kakurete ~ abarashia unkai: Hiru ~)	4:22
13.	"Coming Home"	Masayoshi Soken	大らかな家 (Dai ra ka na ie)	5:31
14.	"Like a Summer Rain"	Masayoshi Soken	夏の雨の如く ～神域浮島 ネバーリープ～ (Natsu no ame nogotoku ~ shin'iki ukishima nebārīpu ~)	5:51
15.	"Close to the Heavens"	Masayoshi Soken	天上の世界 ～アバラシア雲海：夜～ (Tenjō no sekai ~ abarashia unkai: Yoru ~)	4:58
16.	"Jewel"	Masayoshi Soken	宝石 ～雲海探索 ディアデム諸島～ (Hōseki ~ unkai tansaku diademu shotō ~)	3:13
17.	"For the Sky"	Masayoshi Soken	天のため (Ten no tame)	4:17
18.	"Safety in Numbers"	Masayoshi Soken	みんなでいれば怖くない (Min'na de ireba kowakunai)	1:35
19.	"Painted Foothills"	Masayoshi Soken	彩られし山麓 ～高地ドラヴァニア：昼～ (Irodora reshi sanroku ~ kōchi doravu~ania: Hiru ~)	5:30
20.	"The Hand that Gives the Rose"	Masayoshi Soken	武神降臨 ～蛮神ラーヴァナ前哨戦～ (Bushinkōrin ~ Ban-shin rāvu~ana zenshōsen ~)	3:08
21.	"Unbending Steel"	Masayoshi Soken	曲がらぬ刃 ～蛮神ラーヴァナ討滅戦～ (Magaranu ha ~ Ban-shin rāvu~ana tōmetsu-sen ~)	7:24
22.	"Painted Skies"	Masayoshi Soken	彩られし夜空 ～高地ドラヴァニア：夜～ (Irodora reshi yozora ~ kōchi doravu~ania: Yoru ~)	3:53
23.	"Slumber Eternal"	Masayoshi Soken	永遠の眠り ～霊峰踏破 ソーム・アル～ (Eien no nemuri ~ reihō tōha sōmu Aru ~)	5:45
24.	"Landlords"	Masayoshi Soken	ランドロード ～ドラヴァニア雲海：昼～ (Randorōdo ~ doravu~ania unkai: Hiru ~)	4:44
25.	"What is Love?"	Masayoshi Soken	それは愛くぽ？ (Sore wa ai ku po?)	1:15
26.	"Roar of the Wyrm"	Masayoshi Soken	邪竜の咆吼 ～邪竜血戦 ドラゴンズエアリー～ (Yokoshima ryū no hōkō ~ yokoshima ryū kessen doragonzuearī ~)	4:26
27.	"Skylords"	Masayoshi Soken	スカイロード ～ドラヴァニア雲海：夜～ (Sukairōdo ~ doravu~ania unkai: Yoru ~)	4:25
28.	"Contention"	Nobuo Uematsu	闘争 (Tōsō)	3:22
29.	"Nobility Obliges"	Masayoshi Soken	ノブレス・オブリージュ ～イシュガルド上層：昼～ (Noburesu oburīju ~ ishugarudo jōsō: Hiru ~)	9:20
30.	"Hallowed Halls"	Masayoshi Soken	聖座 ～強硬突入 イシュガルド教皇庁～ (Sei-za ~ kyōkō totsunyū ishugarudo kyōkō-chō ~)	2:49
31.	"The Heavens' Ward"	Masayoshi Soken	蒼天騎士団 (Sōten kishi-dan)	3:15
32.	"Night in the Brume"	Masayoshi Soken	雲霧街の夜霧 ～イシュガルド下層：夜～ (Kumogiri machi no yogiri ~ ishugarudo kasō: Yoru ~)	10:14
33.	"Heavy Rain"	Yukiko Takada	雷雨の如く (Raiu nogotoku)	2:40
34.	"Limitless Blue"	Masayoshi Soken	果てなき蒼 ～蛮神ビスマルク前哨戦～ (Hatenaki ao ~ Ban Kami Bisumaruku zenshōsen ~)	3:47
35.	"Woe that Is Madness"	Masayoshi Soken	狂気なる災厄 ～蛮神ビスマルク討滅戦～ (Kyōkinaru saiyaku ~ Ban Kami Bisumaruku tōmetsu-sen ~)	5:08
36.	"Misconception"	Nobuo Uematsu	誤想 (Gosō)	4:47
37.	"Missing Pages"	Masayoshi Soken	欠けた頁 ～低地ドラヴァニア：昼～ (Kaketa pēji ~ teichi doravu~ania: Hiru ~)	3:11
38.	"Paradise Found"	Masayoshi Soken	約束の地 (Yakusoku no ji)	3:59
39.	"The Mushroomery"	Nobuo Uematsu	マトーヤの洞窟 ～蒼天～ (Matōya no dōkutsu ~ sōten ~)	2:55
40.	"Ink Long Dry"	Masayoshi Soken	万世の言葉 ～禁書回収 グブラ幻想図書館～ (Bansei no kotoba ~ kinsho kaishū gubura gensō toshokan ~)	5:34
41.	"Homestead"	Masayoshi Soken	ホームステッド (Hōmusuteddo)	2:52
42.	"The Silent Regard of Stars"	Masayoshi Soken	静寂の星空 ～低地ドラヴァニア：夜～ (Shijima no hoshizora ~ teichi doravu~ania: Yoru ~)	3:33
43.	"Poison Ivy"	Masayoshi Soken	有毒植物 ～草木庭園 聖モシャーヌ植物園～ (Yūdoku shokubutsu ~ kusaki teien Sei moshānu shokubutsu-en ~)	6:04
44.	"Upon the Rocks"	Masayoshi Soken	座礁 ～制圧巨塔 シリウス大灯台～ (Zashō ~ seiatsu kyotō Shiriusu dai tōdai ~)	12:06
45.	"Aetherpause"	Masayoshi Soken	エーテル圏 ～魔航船ヴォイドアーク～ (Ēteru-ken ~ ma kō-sen vu~oidoāku ~)	3:42
46.	"In Darkness, There Is One"	Masayoshi Soken	深淵に潜む者 ～魔航船ヴォイドアーク～ (Shin'en ni hisomu mono ~ ma kō-sen vu~oidoāku ~)	5:05
47.	"Voidal Manifest"	Masayoshi Soken	ヴォイドの棺 ～魔航船ヴォイドアーク～ (Vu~oido no hitsugi ~ ma kō-sen vu~oidoāku ~)	4:44
48.	"Stone and Steel"	Masayoshi Soken	石と鋼 (Ishi to hagane)	4:38
49.	"Order Yet Undeciphered"	Masayoshi Soken	未解読法則 ～魔大陸アジス・ラー～ (Mi kaidoku hōsoku ~ ma tairiku Ajisu rā ~)	11:07
50.	"Unbreakable"	Masayoshi Soken	アンブレーカブル ～博物戦艦 フラクタル・コンティニアム～ (Anbureikaburu ~ hakubutsu senkan furakutaru kontiniamu ~)	4:55
51.	"Imagination"	Masayoshi Soken	イマジネーション ～蒼天聖戦 魔科学研究所～ (Imajinēshon ~ sōten seisen ma kagakukenkyūjo ~)	3:42
52.	"Heroes Never Die"	Masayoshi Soken	英傑は死なず ～蒼天幻想 ナイツ・オブ・ラウンド討滅戦～ (Eiketsu wa shinazu ~ sōten gensō naitsu Obu raundo tōmetsu-sen ~)	7:59
53.	"Heroes"	Masayoshi Soken	英傑 ～ナイツ・オブ・ラウンド討滅戦～ (Eiketsu ~ naitsu Obu raundo tōmetsu-sen ~)	3:49
54.	"Inception"	Masayoshi Soken	発端 (Hottan)	1:06
55.	"Dragonsong"	Nobuo Uematsu	Dragonsong	5:43
56.	"Sins of the Father, Sins of the Son"	Masayoshi Soken	製造者責任 ～機工城アレキサンダー：起動編～ (Seizō-sha sekinin ~ kikō-jō arekisandā: Kidō-hen ~)	2:42
57.	"Locus"	Masayoshi Soken	ローカス ～機工城アレキサンダー：起動編～ (Rōkasu ~ kikō-jō arekisandā: Kidō-hen ~)	8:56
58.	"Metal"	Masayoshi Soken	メタル ～機工城アレキサンダー：起動編～(Metaru ~ kikō-jō arekisandā: Kidō-hen ~)	5:30

=== Duality ===
Final Fantasy XIV: Duality ~Arrangement Album~

Soundtrack album by Masayoshi Soken
- Released: December 7, 2016
- Genre: Video game soundtrack
- Length: 1:08:00

Final Fantasy XIV: Duality ~Arrangement Album~ is a Blu-ray album of rock and piano arrangements of music from Heavensward. It features arrangements by Soken, GUNN, and Keiko of pieces originally composed by Soken for the game, and was published by Square Enix on December 7, 2016. Like From Astral to Umbral, it is split between piano and rock band covers; the first six tracks are piano covers, performed by Keiko, of field and town themes from the game, while the following seven are rock covers by Soken's band The Primals of the musical themes from the game of the primals. The final track on the album is an acoustic and vocal cover of Oblivion, which was a rock song in the original game.

Mike Salbato of RPGFan reviewed the album and described it in similar terms to From Astral, the first arrangement album for the game. He praised the high quality of the arrangements and performances, but found the piano arrangements more interesting for their originality than the rock arrangements; unlike for the From Astral rock arrangements, many of the Duality arrangements were of rock or rock-inspired tracks, which he felt left the arrangements feeling superfluous. He concluded, however, that the piano arrangements and Oblivion cover made the album an "easy recommendation". Tien Hoang of VGMOnline felt it was inferior to From Astral; he described the piano tracks as "fine to listen to", but "not very memorable", and the rock arrangements as enjoyable but predictable and lacking the novelty of the first arranged album.

=== The Far Edge of Fate ===
The Far Edge of Fate: Final Fantasy XIV Original Soundtrack

Soundtrack album by Masayoshi Soken
- Released: June 7, 2017
- Genre: Video game soundtrack
- Length: 3:34:58

A soundtrack album composed of songs from Patch 3.2 through Patch 3.5, was released on 7 June 2017. It sold over 8,900 copies. Tien Hoang of VGMOnline reviewed the album and felt it contained several "great tracks", but was also repetitive.

=== Orchestral albums ===
An album of orchestral arrangements from A Realm Reborn and Heavensward, Final Fantasy XIV Orchestral Arrangement Album, was released on September 20, 2017. Performed by the Tokyo Philharmonic Orchestra, the eight-track album includes arrangements from Sachiko Miyano, Yoshitaka Suzuki, Kenichi Kuroda, Takahiro Tsuji, and Shota Nakama. An expanded eighteen-track album was released on Blu-ray on December 20 the same year, as Eorzean Symphony: Final Fantasy XIV Orchestral Album in two versions, one containing studio recordings and one containing live concert recordings. Only two tracks are not included in the original Orchestral Arrangement Album or are from the game itself with minor changes. Tien Hoang of VGMOnline reviewed both albums; they felt that both albums included a solid set of arrangements and performances, though none were particularly innovative or creative.

=== The Primals ===
The Primals, an album of rock arrangements by the eponymous band created by composer Masayoshi Soken, was released on May 16, 2018. It mostly contains arrangements that were included in the From Astral to Umbral and Duality albums, with some additional tracks from the Heavensward patches. Tien Hoang of VGMOnline reviewed the album, and found that the tracks worked better together on a dedicated album then they had alongside other arrangement styles in their original albums.

== Stormblood ==
Stormblood: Final Fantasy XIV Original Soundtrack

Soundtrack album by Masayoshi Soken
- Released: July 4, 2018
- Genre: Video game soundtrack
- Length: 6:10:19

A soundtrack album composed of songs from the Stormblood expansion, covering Patch 4.0 through Patch 4.3, was released on July 4, 2018. The 105-track Blu-ray album was reviewed by Tien Hoang of VGMOnline, who highly praised the album's quality and emotional impact, though they felt the breadth of references to prior games' music left the album less focused than the album for the Heavensward expansion.

=== Piano ===
Piano Collections Final Fantasy XIV

Soundtrack album
- Released: March 6, 2019
- Genre: Video game soundtrack

An album of piano arrangements, Piano Collections Final Fantasy XIV, was released on March 6, 2019. The 17-track album includes piano renditions of songs from throughout the game's soundtrack. It was reviewed by Tien Hoang of VGMOnline, who found it enjoyable and felt the arrangements new to the album were superior to the inconsequential arrangements of From Astral to Umbral or "improvisational" arrangements from Duality.

=== Journeys ===
Journeys: Final Fantasy XIV Arrangement Album is an album of arranged songs from the Heavensward and Stormblood expansions, split between piano and rock arrangements and released on June 19, 2019. Several of the eighteen tracks were previously included in The Primals and the Final Fantasy XIV Piano Collections albums. In Tien Hoang of VGMOnline's review, he termed it the best of the piano/rock arrangement albums released to date, with creative arrangements of solid pieces.

== Shadowbringers ==
Shadowbringers: Final Fantasy XIV Original Soundtrack

Soundtrack album by Masayoshi Soken
- Released: September 11, 2019
- Genre: Video game soundtrack

An album composed of songs from Patch 4.4 through Patch 5.05, covering the Shadowbringers expansion, was released on September 11, 2019.

=== Pulse ===
An album of electronic remixes of Final Fantasy XIV tracks, Pulse: Final Fantasy XIV Remix Album, was released on September 30, 2020. The fourteen-track album contains remixes by Takafumi Imamura, Daiki Ishikawa, and Masayoshi Soken, covering songs from A Realm Reborn and the Heavensward, Stormblood, and Shadowbringers expansions. It was reviewed by Tien Hoang of VGMOnline, who found it "solid and entertaining" and one of the more successful arrangement projects of the game's music.

=== Death Unto Dawn ===
Death Unto Dawn: Final Fantasy XIV Original Soundtrack

Soundtrack album by Masayoshi Soken
- Released: September 15, 2021
- Genre: Video game soundtrack

Another album, composed of songs from Patch 5.1 through 5.55, was released on September 15, 2021.

== Endwalker ==
Endwalker: Final Fantasy XIV Original Soundtrack

Soundtrack album by Masayoshi Soken
- Released: February 23, 2022
- Genre: Video game soundtrack

A soundtrack album composed of songs from the Endwalker expansion was released on February 23, 2022. The album includes 63 tracks and has a duration of 4:39:22. Masayoshi Soken composed the majority of the expansion's score in addition to his duties as sound director. Due to his health issues, Nobuo Uematsu was asked to prioritize his other projects and did not contribute to the soundtrack. The main theme of the game, "Footfalls", incorporates elements from grunge and shoegaze. It also quotes musical phrases and lyrics from each of the previous expansions' main themes to highlight Endwalker's status as the conclusion of a long-running story arc. Sam Carter of Architects provided the main vocals with Amanda Achen, who had performed on Shadowbringers, on background vocals. Mike Salbato, in his review of the album for RPGFan, highly praised the emotional response the music gave him, in both the album and the game, while Tien Hoang of VGMOnline praised the vocal tracks as particularly noteworthy.

=== Growing Light ===
A soundtrack album composed of songs from Patch 6.1 through Patch 6.5 was released on March 27, 2024 as Growing Light: Final Fantasy XIV Original Soundtrack. It consists of 95 tracks and has a duration of 6:46:59.

=== Arrangements ===
A third album of orchestral arrangements, Final Fantasy XIV Orchestral Arrangement Album Vol.3, was released on December 7, 2022, containing 7 tracks and a duration of 35:59. An album of arrangements of music from the Endwalker expansion, Forge Ahead: Final Fantasy XIV ~ Arrangement Album ~, was released on November 29, 2023. The 19-track album has a duration of 1:33:43, and like Journeys is split between piano arrangements and rock arrangements, performed by The Primals. An album of chill-out music arrangements titled Sanctuary's Heart: Final Fantasy XIV Chill Arrangement Album was released on September 21, 2023, containing 20 tracks and a duration of 1:03:55.

== Dawntrail ==
Dawntrail: Final Fantasy XIV Original Soundtrack

Soundtrack album by Masayoshi Soken
- Released: October 30, 2024
- Genre: Video game soundtrack

A soundtrack album composed of songs from the Dawntrail expansion was released on October 30, 2024. The album includes 66 tracks and has a duration of 4:48:42. Masayoshi Soken led the composing of the expansion's score in addition to his duties as sound director. Other composers included Takafumi Imamura, Daiki Ishikawa, Saya Yasaki, Justin Frieden, Shoya Sunakawa, Keiko Osaki, Yoshitaka Suzuki, and TomoLow. The soundtrack uses jazz as a basis because it fits with the theme of diverse elements coming together. A number of guest vocalists are featured including Chrissy Costanza of Against the Current, who provided vocals for "Give It All".

=== Trail to the Heavens ===
A soundtrack album composed of songs from Patch 7.1 through Patch 7.5 was released on September 16, 2026 as Trail to the Heavens: Final Fantasy XIV Original Soundtrack. It consists of 79 tracks and has a duration of 5:32:52. The included song "Everything Burns" is a collaboration between Tom Morello and Caleb Shomo of the band Beartooth. Bonus tracks included with the physical release add a further 71 tracks, mainly songs from Final Fantasy XI used for raid content, plus other bonus songs featured in other raids, minigames and more.

=== Arrangements ===
A second album of electronic remixes of Final Fantasy XIV tracks, Pulse: Final Fantasy XIV Remix Album Vol.2, was released on September 24, 2025. The 15-track album contains remixes by Shoya Sunakawa, Takafumi Imamura, Saya Yasaki, and Daiki Ishikawa, covering songs from Endwalker and Dawntrail. It was also released as three EPs, Session 1, Session 2, and B-Sides, on December 10, 2024, January 9, 2025, and September 24. A fourth album of orchestral arrangements, Final Fantasy XIV Orchestral Arrangement Album Vol.4, was released on December 17, 2025, containing 7 tracks and a duration of 19:35.

== Legacy ==
Four tracks from Final Fantasy XIV ("Navigator's Glory", "Twilight Over Thanalan", "Primal Judgement", and an orchestral rendition of "Answers" with vocals by Susan Calloway) were included in the Distant Worlds: Music from Final Fantasy Returning Home concert on November 6 and 7, 2010 in Tokyo, Japan, which was released as a CD-DVD package in 2011. Those four tracks along with "Beneath Bloodied Banners" were then added to the general setlist options for the international Distant Worlds: Music from Final Fantasy concert tour. Tracks from A Realm Reborn were included in the Nintendo 3DS rhythm game Theatrhythm Final Fantasy: Curtain Call. An 88-page book of sheet music for piano arrangements of songs from the soundtrack titled Final Fantasy XIV Piano Solo Sheet Music was published by Dream Music Factory in 2010, containing the tracks featured in the mini-albums. Dream Music Factory also published piano-arranged sheet music for Before Meteor in 2013 titled Before Meteor: Final Fantasy XIV Piano Solo Sheet Music. In April 2026, "Everything Burns" from Dawntrail was used by WWE in a promotional video for the match between Seth Rollins and Gunther at WrestleMania 42.

A series of concerts of music from Final Fantasy XIV began in 2017, titled Eorzean Symphony. The series began in September with a three-night set of concerts in Tokyo performed by the Tokyo Philharmonic Orchestra, led by conductor Hirofumi Kurita. It continued in June 2018 with another concert in Los Angeles and in then again in August in Dortmund, Germany. An album was released on December 20, 2017 containing music from the Tokyo concerts; a Blu-ray release contains sixteen tracks as well as video from the concerts, while a CD release contains eight tracks. The album sold over 13,100 copies.

On November 11, 2026, it was announced that Eikichi Iwai [ja], best known as the bass player for the Final Fantasy XIV band The Primals had passed away at age 57, less than two weeks after performing at Final Fantasy XIV's Fan Festival in Tokyo. Players held memorials in-game to mourn his passing.
