= Valkyria Chronicles (video game) =

2008 video game

- European PlayStation 3 box art
- Developers: Sega; Media.Vision (Remastered) (Note: Microsoft Windows version developed by Little Stone Software; PlayStation 4 version developed by Media.Vision)
- Publisher: Sega
- Directors: Shuntaro Tanaka; Takaharu Terada
- Producer: Ryutaro Nonaka
- Designer: Takeshi Ozawa
- Artists: Raita Honjou; Hirotaka Kanazawa
- Composer: Hitoshi Sakimoto
- Series: Valkyria Chronicles
- Platforms: PlayStation 3; Windows; PlayStation 4; Nintendo Switch
- Release: PlayStation 3; JP: April 24, 2008; UK: October 31, 2008; NA: November 4, 2008; Windows; WW: November 11, 2014; PlayStation 4 (Remastered); JP: February 10, 2016; UK/NA: May 17, 2016; Nintendo Switch; JP: September 27, 2018; NA/EU: October 16, 2018
- Genre: Tactical role-playing
- Mode: Single-player

Valkyria Chronicles (Note: Known in Japan as Senjō no Varukyuria -Gallian Chronicles- (Japanese: 戦場のヴァルキュリア -Gallian Chronicles-; lit. Valkyria of the Battlefield: Gallian Chronicles)) is a tactical role-playing video game developed and published by Sega for the PlayStation 3 in 2008. A Windows version was released on November 11, 2014. A remastered version for PlayStation 4 was released in Japan on February 10, 2016, with a Western release on May 17, 2016. The game was released digitally for the Nintendo Switch on September 27, 2018, in Japan and on October 16, 2018, in North America and Europe. The later versions include previously released downloadable content.

The game is set in Europa, a fictional region loosely based on Europe during the early years of World War II. Because of its abundance of Ragnite ore, which takes the place of petroleum in the game setting, the neutral nation of Gallia comes under attack from the East Europan Imperial Alliance, which is itself engaged in war with the Atlantic Federation. Players take control of a unit of the Gallian Militia, dedicated to repelling the invasion. The game's visuals, which use Sega's CANVAS graphics engine, resemble pencil drawings in motion.

Valkyria Chronicles earned numerous awards from several notable video game publications and has been cited as one of the greatest video games of all time. The success of the title spawned a media franchise, including several manga titles and an anime series. Two sequels were released for PlayStation Portable: Valkyria Chronicles II in 2010, and Valkyria Chronicles III in 2011. A spin-off, Valkyria Revolution, was released in 2017 for the PlayStation 4, PlayStation Vita, and Xbox One. The fourth entry, Valkyria Chronicles 4 was released in 2018 for PlayStation 4, Nintendo Switch, Windows, and Xbox One.

== Gameplay ==
The overhead map view of Command Mode. Colored lines indicate enemies' current level of awareness toward the unit selected by the player.

Valkyria Chronicles is a tactical role-playing game in which the player uses a unique turn-based battle system called BLiTZ (Battle of Live Tactical Zones). During their turn the player views an overhead map in Command Mode, but zooms in to control each individual unit on the battlefield in Action Mode. Movement and other actions are handled in real time during Action Mode, though limited in movement by an action point (AP) gauge that varies for each type of character. During Target Mode, the player is in direct control of characters' aim while the action freezes, allowing for head shots and other maneuvers. Taking command of individual units during the player's phase costs Command Points, which can be used dynamically to grant movement to many different units or the same unit consecutively with diminishing AP reserve, depending on what the player wants to accomplish. By using their troops the player must fulfill various conditions depending on the mission in order to achieve victory, most often the capture of a major enemy encampment. Upon completing missions, the player is awarded money and experience with which to upgrade their materiel and character classes, respectively, and the game's story is advanced. Missions can be failed if the player's forces are wholly incapacitated or killed, the squad's main battle tank is destroyed, or the player's main base camp is captured by the enemy.

Homer Peron attacks Imperial troops with a hand grenade in Action Mode. Onomatopoeia is often used to reinforce the game's visual style.

Each character in the game fulfills a specific role — for instance, Alicia is a mid-range rifle-toting Scout, while Welkin is a Tank Commander. Other roles include Shocktroopers (assault infantry); Lancers, who specialize in anti-tank warfare; Engineers, who have poor combat skills but can repair tanks, remove landmines, and replenish the ammunition of allied soldiers; and Snipers. These various units form a rock-paper-scissors dynamic of strength and weakness. The foot soldiers (Scout, Shocktrooper, and Sniper) are effective against slower anti-tank units, anti-tank units can quickly destroy tanks with a well-aimed shot, and tanks are generally devastating against infantry, whose anti-personnel weapons are unable to inflict any significant frontal damage. While each character within a class is basically similar in terms of weaponry and statistics, each individual has a distinguishing set of Potentials: special abilities or stat modifiers triggered by various psychological or environmental factors in battle.

The environment also factors heavily in combat. In an urban level, for example, snipers can be sent onto rooftops to eliminate unsuspecting enemies below. Tanks can knock down walls and other obstacles to open new paths. Buildings and other structures offer hard cover around which to maneuver. Foliage offers soft cover to reduce the chance of being spotted by the enemy and to confound their aim when seen. As the Gallian forces advance across the battlefield, control points can be captured, giving the player a tactical advantage and offering additional locations in which to call reinforcements. As Welkin, the player can issue various Orders for the purpose of things such as artillery strikes, supervising medics, and improving offensive or defensive capabilities of various characters.

== Plot ==
In 1935 E.C., the continent of Europa is dominated by two superpowers: The Autocratic East Europan Imperial Alliance in the east and a commonwealth of loosely allied democracies known as the Atlantic Federation in the west. The economies of both powers depend on a precious multipurpose mineral called Ragnite. Its growing scarcity results in the Empire declaring war on the Federation, sparking the Second Europan War. The Empire uses its military superiority to quickly put the Federation on the defensive. Emboldened by their progress and momentum, the Empire decides to invade the neutral Principality of Gallia to seize its rich Ragnite deposits.

When Imperial forces launch an attack on the Gallian border town of Bruhl, Welkin Gunther (Dave Wittenberg/Susumu Chiba), son of the country's hero General Belgen Gunther, is forced to fight for his life alongside the town watch captain, Alicia Melchiott (Colleen O'Shaughnessey/Marina Inoue). Together with Welkin's adopted sister Isara (Laura Bailey/Houko Kuwashima) and using Belgen's prototype tank from the first war, the Edelweiss, they escape to the capital city of Randgriz and join the Gallian militia. Welkin is promoted to the rank of Lieutenant and assumes command of the newly formed Squad 7, with Alicia acting as his non-commissioned officer. Members of the squad initially question Welkin's qualifications due to a lack of combat experience. He quickly gains their trust and loyalty, however, with his brilliant tactics. Welkin and Alicia soon become romantically engaged, but Isara is tragically killed by an Imperial sniper.

After Squad 7 wages a successful campaign against Imperial forces, the crown prince Maximilian (Matthew Yang King/Jun Fukuyama) deploys one of his commanders, Selvaria Bles (April Stewart/Sayaka Ohara), a rare descendant of the Valkyrians who are believed to have saved the ancient world from the Darcsen race. Using innate magic powers and equipped with a legendary Ragnite lance and shield, Selvaria destroys the Gallian army. Alicia is shot by Welkin's archaeologist colleague Faldio Landzaat (Robin Atkin Downes/Takahiro Sakurai) to awaken her own latent Valkyrian powers. Alicia is able to drive Selvaria back, allowing the Gallians to advance to the border. At the cost of her own life, Selvaria uses the "final flame" after the capture of the Ghirlandaio fortress, killing the entire core of Gallian military and leaving only the militia, including Squad 7, remaining.

In an attempt to create his own empire, Maximilian uses a "land dreadnought", the Marmota, to break through Gallia's defenses and steal a giant Valkyrian lance from inside Randgriz Castle. Princess Cordelia gi Randgriz (Kate Higgins/Mamiko Noto) reveals herself to be Darcsen - the Valkyrians rewrote history to make themselves into heroes, while an allied Darcsen tribe gained Randgriz as the spoils. With Alicia's help, Squad 7 is able to board the Marmota and send Maximilian to his demise, destroying the dreadnought and ending the conflict between the two factions. Alicia and Welkin return to Bruhl, where they marry and raise a daughter named Isara together.

== Development ==
The earliest concept for Valkyria Chronicles was created in 2003, during discussions between director Shuntaro Tanaka and producer Ryutaro Nonaka. The two were part of neighboring teams working on different games; Nonaka was leading production on Nightshade, while Tanaka was completing the GameCube port of Skies of Arcadia. The two wanted to work on something new, with Tanaka suggesting a game based around a dramatic war story. Both had worked on the Sakura Wars series, but knew they would face restrictions if they created something within that series, so they created a new concept. Nonaka and Tanaka later said the many similarities to Sakura Wars were mainly because of shared development teams and gameplay styles rather than conscious choices. A key aspect of the project was to go against market trends, which were focusing on specific genre archetypes that did not allow for much creativity on the team's part. The initial pitch was titled "Gallian Panzers". The pitch artwork was created by Daisuke Tabayashi, who would stay as part of the game's art and modelling team. After the concept was approved, the team made a movie pitch using its new official title. During its early concept stages, no platform had been decided; Nonaka vaguely thought the game would be produced for the PlayStation 2, for which the team had been principally developing. He also considered developing the game for the PlayStation Portable. When the PS3 was revealed and internal discussions began about its use by the company, Nonaka suggested that Valkyria Chronicles could be produced for the platform. The production team was based in Sega's GE2 R&D division. The staff had worked on a wide variety of titles for Sega, including Sakura Wars and Skies of Arcadia. Production for the PS3 was both liberating thanks to the increased hardware specifications, and challenging due to working out how to best use the console's CPU. Its final Japanese title represented the focus on war, with the term "Valkyria" symbolising its fantasy elements.

In its earliest form, the gameplay was a traditional tactical simulation game played from an overhead view. After considering this, Nonaka—comparing it to a game of shogi—realised players would feel little emotional investment in characters if they continued with this gameplay style. Much of the early development was devoted to creating a working system that would combine tactical elements with real-time action. The concept of the BLiTZ battle system was to encourage player freedom. When creating the battle system around firearms rather than swords and magic, the team needed to abandon many of the logical RPG standards. The team chose to have players control individual units to further emphasise the game's themes. The AP system was designed around the concept of emulating the fear of soldiers in combat, afraid to take a step in case of hidden enemies or making a fatal move. The class-based leveling was a response to the large number of playable characters. If they went with traditional character-based leveling, the team knew players would likely stick to a few favorites. This leveling system also played into the permadeath systems and the focus on turn numbers determining how players did on a map rather than unit survival. The emphasis was getting the players emotionally invested by picking party members based on personality, making their loss in battle more noticeable. A sixth character class, the Medic, was originally planned. The only remnant of its inclusion was the rescue mechanic for downed units. Nonaka attributed his ability to handle the dual-natured gameplay from his work on both the tactics-based Sakura Wars and the action game Nightshade.

=== Design ===
The world's period setting—based on Europe during the period before and during World War II during 1930s to 1940s was in place from the beginning of development. The aim was to blend this setting with medieval elements, with the rest of the world view and design springing from that point. Many levels included direct homages to events from World War II, including forest battles, an amphibious landing, and a fort line similar to the Maginot Line. The country of Gallia drew inspiration from smaller countries of that time like Belgium and the Netherlands, which were often caught between larger powers. The team considered using Switzerland as inspiration, but its mountainous terrain made tank combat impracticable, so the team principally used the Netherlands as inspiration for Gallia's geography. Its name and aspects of its story were inspired by Gaul. The Empire and Federation were respectively based on Germany and the United Kingdom during the 1930s. The game's idyllic scenery was influenced by the team's desire to incorporate fantasy, as a purely urban setting might reduce the opportunity for fantastic elements.

Tanaka wrote the main narrative and scenarios for the characters, assisted by a dedicated writing team. While the leads Welkin and Alicia and much of the key supporting cast were present from the earliest stages, several had different artistic designs and several concept scenes and more fantastical elements such as floating islands were dropped from the final game. Welkin's name and parts of his storyline were derived from Gaulish chieftain Vercingetorix who united Gaul against the Romans. To give the story a more personal feeling and draw from Japanese military history, the characters were made militiamen without extensive military training, creating a deliberate contrast to the hardened career soldier protagonists from the movie Saving Private Ryan and the series Combat!. The history between the Darcsan and Valkyria groups was written as a tragic tale, with people accepting as fact a history written by victorious powers. The team were directly inspired by the ethnic conflicts fuelling World War II, and the long histories behind them. The Valkyria formed an allegory for weapons of mass destruction in real-life conflicts.

The lead characters were designed by Raita Honjou. Honjou was selected after the team saw his art, as they felt he could portray both the realistic and fantastic elements of the game's world. The overall visual design was influenced by the long-running anime series World Masterpiece Theater. As part of their research on the graphical style, the team researched both realistic and comic-based art styles. The uniforms were based around a variety of real-life uniforms, with both practical elements and individual quirks that would not be allowed in real-life such as Rosie's hairstyle. Originally directly inspired by World War II uniforms, they looked too futuristic for the setting. The team instead drew inspiration from earlier uniform designs, which were more specific to different countries. They also made an effort to keep American uniform influences out of the designs. For the large majority of minor and supporting characters, other artists were in charge. The team originally planned 100 side characters, but this proved practically impossible, so the number was cut to 50. The Imperial tank designs were based on those from the Russian military. To ease unit identification for players, the Gallian and Imperial forces were respectively colored blue and red. The game's early internal promotional videos focused on the art style over gameplay, as the team knew if they simply described its genre it would give the wrong impression to executives.

Valkyria Chronicles made use of a proprietary game engine dubbed CANVAS, which produced stylised graphics modelled on watercolor paintings. Nonaka wanted to blend traditional animation style with CGI elements, something he had previously experienced with the "Neo-CGI" used in Sakura Wars 3: Is Paris Burning?. CANVAS came about from experiments within another of Sega's R&D department with next-generation engine technology. Its graphical style, which allowed for the emulation of hand-drawn artwork, was picked by staff once the game was moved to the PS3. A key figure in the engine's development for Valkyria Chronicles was Hirotaka Kanazawa. Kanazawa helped with the early map designs. During early development, the team struggled to make their vision work with the CANVAS prototype. The graphics still had a strong CGI aesthetic, with crisp graphics and a strong draw distance. These did not fit with Nonaka's vision for the game, which was a non-photorealistic presentation described as a natural evolution from the styles of Sakura Wars and Skies of Arcadia. With this concept in mind, Kanazawa and Tabayashi redesigned the engine to show these graphics. One of the elements the team focused on was shadows effects, with environments and characters requiring two different shadow types with differing strengths. Using the CANVAS engine was a challenge for the designers and programmers due to its heavy hardware demands, with the team's PC development needed two stacked graphics cards to run the software without crashing.

=== Music ===
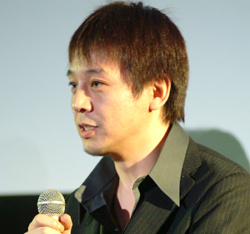
Hitoshi Sakimoto composed the soundtrack for Valkyria Chronicles, being attached to the project from its inception.

The music was handled by Hitoshi Sakimoto, a composer noted for his work on the Final Fantasy series and other projects through his company Basiscape. Sakimoto was brought on board the project during its pre-production stage, though most of his compositional work during 2007. He was brought in by Nonaka, who contacted him about Valkyria Chronicles when it still had a small team and had not entered full production. Sakimoto assumed it would be a small-scale game for a portable console, so its development for PS3 came as a shock to him. Valkyria Chronicles was the first PS3 project Basiscape worked on. The battle scores were the most difficult to create due to the need for scale. Several tracks made use of a full live orchestra. These tracks were performed by the Eminence Symphony Orchestra founded in Australia.

When told about the game, Sakimoto received the impression of militarism, which was reflected throughout the score. Originally treating as a musical investigation of war, Sakimoto's discussions with the staff began steering the score towards portraying the romance between Welkin and Alicia. Ultimately, the music's military elements became supporting parts for the romantic themes. The main theme was created by Sakimoto during pre-production, as one of three pieces based on the demo movie; the other pieces included the opening battle theme "Desperate Battle" and the story theme "Empty Loneliness". Sakimoto created three different arrangements for the team to choose from, with the current one being picked due to its thematic qualities. The main theme recurs as a leitmotif in multiple tracks. A dominant instrument used by Sakimoto was taiko drums, using a wide variety of them to create different sounds and emulate the sound of a marching band. Two themes were created by Sakimoto for Selvaria; the first theme "A Valkyria Awakened" had Sakimoto making use of traditional classical music and nonsensical chorus work to emulate the group's mythical status, and an arranged version called "Signs of the Valkyria" which would communicate Selvaria's tragic past. Military base themes made heavy use of brass instruments, and the character theme for the Darcsans was modelled in Israeli music.

A key vocal theme is "A Love Passed On". Sakimoto created the track as a "Gallian traditional song". He planned to write a short version without a full orchestra, but after learning the original song would not be used extensively, he focused on the orchestral version. The melody of "A Love Passed On" was used in the track "The Legacy", which played during the epilogue cutscenes. A version for solo piano was written for that final scene, but it was dropped and only included on the soundtrack's album release. The Japanese version was written by Taihei Sato, and sung by Rosie's voice actress Megumi Toyoguchi. According to Sakimoto, the song moved her so much that she cried after finishing recording. The English version was performed by Hedy Burress. The game's opening and ending song, "No Matter How Far..." was performed by Japanese singer Juju. It was the only song with which Sakimoto had no involvement. Juju was suggested to the team by Sega's marketing division. After hearing some of her published work, the team pushed to have her work on the game. Her producer offered a song that had yet to be released, which the team accepted. They collaborated with Juju to rework the song so its tone and lyrics fitted the world of Valkyria Chronicles.

== Release ==
On September 29, 2008, Sega of America held a Valkyria Chronicles pre-launch event at the Sony Metreon in San Francisco. Press and public were invited, and Sega used a raffle to give away soundtracks, figurines of the characters, matted art posters signed by Nonaka, and an 80 GB PlayStation 3. Sega let the community send in questions before the event, and posted these to Nonaka in an interview during the event. Pictures and a follow-up of the event were posted on the Sega of America Blog.

Supplemental downloadable content (DLC) was made available for purchase via PlayStation Network. First is the inclusion of a Hard EX Mode, extra challenging versions of existing skirmish missions where the Edelweiss is unavailable. Two side story chapters, "Edy's Mission: Enter the Edy Detachment" and "Selvaria's Mission: Behind Her Blue Flame", introduce Squad 7's motliest crew led by Edy Nelson and Homer Pieron, and the early portion of the invasion into Gallia as seen from the Imperial perspective. Hard EX Mode and Edy's Mission were originally released for the Japanese version on August 8, 2008, while Selvaria's Mission was released on October 31 of the same year. All three were made available in North America on April 16, 2009. A fourth DLC, titled "Edy Detachment's Formal Challenge!" was made available in Japan on June 26, 2009, and in North America on February 25, 2010. Included are a set of six challenge missions, each focusing on one of the game's unit classes.

Valkyria Chronicles was re-released in Japanese retails stores under its The Best label on March 5, 2009, with a retail price of ¥3,900. This version of the game includes Edy's Mission without need of download.

Valkyria Chronicles was ported to Windows and released on Steam on November 11, 2014. This version of the game includes all downloadable content. The PC release features performance improvements, including the ability to play the game at 60 frames per second and on resolutions greater than 1080p, in addition to customised control mapping.

A remastered version, titled Valkyria Chronicles Remastered, was announced by Sega and released on May 17, 2016, for PlayStation 4 in North America and Europe. The remastered console version runs at 1080p and 60 frames per second and includes both Japanese and English audio as well as all downloadable content. Outlet Crash Landed praised the remastered versions visuals and still stellar gameplay in their review, but criticized the lack of PlayStation 4 functionality implemented. This version was released digitally for the Nintendo Switch on September 27, 2018, in Japan and October 16, 2018, in North America and Europe.

== Reception ==
Reception

Aggregate score
Aggregator	Score
Metacritic	PS3: 86/100; PC: 85/100; PS4: 84/100; NS: 84/100

Review scores
Publication	Score
Electronic Gaming Monthly	A−
Famitsu	34/40
Game Informer	8.5/10
GameRevolution	B+
GameSpot	8.5/10
GameTrailers	9.1/10
IGN	9/10
X-Play	4/5
RPGamer	5/5

Valkyria Chronicles has received very favorable reviews from numerous sources, including writers for IGN, RPGFan, G4TV's X-Play, and GameTrailers. Kevin VanOrd of GameSpot was impressed with the title's gameplay design, noting that it gave players a new sense of tactical freedom absent in other games of the same genre via the removal of certain staples such as a grid-based map. Some reviewers enjoyed the active and strategic nature of combat. According to Game Revolution's Chris Hudak, "nail-gnawingly tense" situations kept the player emotionally involved in the game. Both the game's story and the way in which it was presented were cited as strong points. Longevity was also attributed to the game, with James Quentin Clark of RPGFan noting that, "the game gets better the more you play it." While pleased overall, multiple reviewers criticized the artificial intelligence of enemy forces.

=== Sales ===
Despite receiving positive press, sales of the game have been mixed. While it sold 77,000 copies in its first week of release in Japan and a further 81,000 during its budget release, the game only sold 33,000 copies in the United States during November 2008. The game failed to reach the top 100 sold software in the month of November; it was the 93rd best-selling game in Japan in 2008, selling 141,589 copies. Despite weak initial North American sales, Valkyria Chronicles recovered with sales sharply increasing in April 2009 following a price cut and the simultaneous release of an anime based on the game. Approximately a year after the game's initial release, both producer Ryutaro Nonaka and gamers surveyed by Famitsu stated interest in a sequel to the game. As of 2015, the PS3 version had shipped over one million units worldwide.

The 2014 PC version of the game exceeded its publisher's expectations, topping the Steam sales charts on the day of its release, ahead of the then also recently launched games Call of Duty: Advanced Warfare and Assassin's Creed Unity. In the United Kingdom, the original PlayStation 3 release failed to enter the all-formats top 40 in 2008, debuting at number 18 on the PlayStation 3 chart. By contrast, Valkyria Chronicles Remastered debuted at number six on the UK all-formats chart in May 2016. It also received favorable reviews, with a Metacritic score of 85. As of March 2015, it sold over 200,000 copies on Steam, exceeding expectations. As of April 2018, the Steam version was estimated to have sold about 940,000 copies. The remastered PS4 version has sold 39,071 copies in Japan as of December 2016. In total, the game sold about two million copies across all platforms.

=== Awards and nominations ===
Valkyria Chronicles won "Best Artistic Graphics" from GameSpot. The game's soundtrack was awarded the "Best Original Soundtrack" by GameSpy, and Strategy Game of the Year 2008. GameTrailers nominated it for the "Best Role-Playing Game" category. IGN recognized the game as "PlayStation 3 Strategy Game of 2008. RPGFan awarded the game with the "PlayStation 3 RPG of the Year" and "Best Strategy RPG on a Console" awards. and several RPGamer awards including the "RPG of the Year", "Best Graphics", and "PlayStation 3 RPG of the Year" categories. On June 17, 2010, Valkyria Chronicles was recognized by Guinness World Records as the best strategy RPG on the PlayStation 3.

== Adaptations ==
Four manga adaptations, two Drama CDs and an anime television series have been released based on the game.

== Notes and references ==
=== Bibliography ===
- Valkyria Chronicles: Limited Edition Artbook. Sega. September 21, 1996. BLUS-30196.
- Valkyria Chronicles: Design Archive. Udon Entertainment. 2011-02-08. ISBN 978-1-9267-7816-7.
