= List of Valkyria Chronicles episodes =

Valkyria Chronicles DVD cover of volume 1, released in Japan. Welkin Gunther and Alicia Melchiott, the protagonists of the first Valkyria Chronicles, are featured on the cover.

Valkyria Chronicles is an anime series loosely based on the Sega video game Valkyria Chronicles, the first game of the series of the same name. It began broadcasting on April 4, 2009. The show is produced by Aniplex's A-1 Pictures. The series is directed by Yasutaka Yamamoto and written by Michiko Yokote under the Project Valkyria Group. Valkyria Chronicles aired on Animax, Tokyo MX, MBS, CBC, Chiba TV, Television Kanagawa, Television Hokkaido, BS11 and TVQ Kyushu Broadcasting.

Set during the Second Europan War between The Autocratic East Europan Imperial Alliance and Atlantic Federation, the plot focuses on the Gallian Front fought between the Empire and The Principality of Gallia. Welkin Gunther, a college student and son of the First Europan War hero General Belgen Gunther, Isara Gunther, a brilliant Darcsen mechanic and Welkin's foster sister, and Alicia Melchiott, a baker and member of the Bruhl Townwatch, get involved in the war when the Imperials invade Gallia to secure its rich Ragnite deposits. After managing to escape their hometown Bruhl after the Imperials captured it, the three of them join Squad 7 of the Gallian Militia to help free their country from the Empire.

The theme song, "Asu e no Kizuna" (明日へのキズナ; lit. 'The Bonds that Lead to Tomorrow') is performed by Catherine St. Onge, as winner of the Animax Anison Grand Prix competition, under her chosen moniker of Himeka; the original score for the anime is composed and conducted by the game's composer Hitoshi Sakimoto. Her CD single has been released on May 27, 2009. The ending theme, "Ano Kaze ni Notte" (アノ風ニノッテ) is sung by the band pe'zmoku with a CD single released on May 27, 2009; the special version features a cover of Welkin, Alicia and Faldio. The second theme song, "Kanashimi Rensa" (カナシミレンサ), is sung by Maria that starts episode 14. The second ending song, "Hitotsu no Negai" (ひとつの願い), is sung by Hikari Inoue beginning from episode 14 until episode 25. Episode 26's ending song is "Brightest Morning", which is also performed by Inoue. CD singles for Kanashimi Rensa and Hitotsu no Negai were released on August 12, 2009, and August 5, 2009. A Valkyria Chronicles drama CD was released on July 24, 2009, with another on October 7, 2009.

Nine Region 2 DVDs of Valkyria Chronicles were released, with volume 1 released on August 5, 2009. Volume 2 was released on September 2, 2009. Volume 3 was released on October 7, 2009. Volume 4 was released on November 4, 2009. Volume 5 was released on December 12, 2009. Volume 6 was released January 13, 2010. Volume 7 was released on February 3, 2010. Volume 8 was released on March 3, 2010. Volume 9 was released on April 7, 2010. Each DVD volume contained a Valkyria Chronicles Theater OVA mini-episode. A BD-box was released on April 27, 2011.

== Episodes ==
No.	Title	Original release date
1	"Encounter and Battle"; Transliteration: "Senka no Deai" (Japanese: 戦火の出会い)	April 4, 2009
Under threat of an approaching Imperial invasion, the inhabitants of Bruhl are forced to evacuate under the protection and assistance of the Bruhl Townwatch. Alicia, a member of the Townwatch, arrests Welkin Gunther at gunpoint on suspicion of espionage, despite his protestations of innocence. Welkin manages to escape and Alicia, still convinced that he is an Imperial spy, gives chase. During the chase, both of them are spotted by Imperial scouts and fired upon. The two retreat to the safety of the Gunther estate in the Bruhl countryside, where they meet up with Welkin's Darcsen foster-sister Isara. Imperial troops and tanks arrive and surround the estate.
2	"Prayer of the Edelweiss Dandelion"; Transliteration: "Konayukisō no Inori" (Japanese: コナユキソウの祈り)	April 11, 2009
Welkin, Isara, and Alicia manage to escape using the prototype tank Edelweiss, which was designed and built by Isara's biological father, a Darcsen engineer. They flee to Bruhl, with the Imperial forces in close pursuit. The Bruhl Townwatch has to delay the Imperials to allow the evacuation to proceed unhindered and hold out until the Regular Army arrives; however, they are handicapped by their lack of combat experience and poorly maintained equipment and suffer badly. In the Edelweiss, Welkin and Isara attack the invading Imperial troops and tanks to give the remaining Townwatch members the necessary time to escape from Bruhl as the Gallian Regular Army reaches the outskirts of Bruhl. However, even though they arrive in time to rescue the civilians, the Regular Army decides against retaking Bruhl from the superior Imperial force. Due to the capture of Bruhl by the Imperials, Alicia and her friend Susie Evans enlist in the Gallian Militia. Alicia is later surprised to find out that Welkin has also joined the Militia.
3	"The Birth of Squad Seven"; Transliteration: "Dainana Shōtai Tanjō" (Japanese: 第7小隊誕生)	April 18, 2009
Welkin is promoted to the rank of Lieutenant and assigned as commander of Squad 7 with Alicia as his Sergeant and second in command, much to her dismay. They encounter Faldio Landzaat, an old college friend of Welkin's who has been appointed commander of Squad 1. Welkin introduces himself to Squad 7 but his new subordinates treat him with disdain as they believe, correctly, that he is naive and inexperienced. Squad 7 sets off for Vasel Bridge, which connects the main road to the capital city of Randgriz, and is under Imperials control. When certain members of Squad voice objections about the presence of Isara in the group because she is a Darcsen, Welkin makes a bet with them that if he and Squad 7 manages to retake the bridge in two days, they have to accept his command and Isara's continued presence. The following morning, using fog as cover, the Edelweiss dives into the river and reaches the other side in a surprise attack allowing Squad 7 to capture the bridge. After the battle, most of the Squad 7 have accepted Welkin with the exception of Rosie who adamantly refuses to acknowledge Isara.
4	"A Brief Day Off"; Transliteration: "Tsukanoma no Kyūjitsu" (Japanese: 束の間の休日)	April 25, 2009
Faldio attempts to socialize with Alicia with mixed results. Despite the success of Squad 7 in capturing the Vasel Bridge from the Imperials, General Damon of the Gallian Regular Army remains disdainful of the Militia, and chooses to exclude Squad 7 from participation in an assault on a vital Imperial supply base in Kloden, leading to widespread resentment from the Militia. Alicia is troubled by Welkin's quiet acceptance of General Damon's implicit insult, but Faldio seizes the chance to encourage her to have more faith in Welkin. Damon is defeated by General Gregor of the Imperial Army and Squad 7 is then ordered to attack Kloden, with support from Faldio's Squad 1.
5	"Assault on Kloden"; Transliteration: "Kurōden Kishūsen" (Japanese: クローデン奇襲戦)	May 2, 2009
Welkin and Squad 7 team up with Faldio and Squad 1 to attack the heavily defended Kloden supply base, held by General Gregor. When Rosie captures a porcavian (a winged pig), leading to the discovery of an animal trail, Welkin proposes using the Edelweiss and Squad 7 led by Rosie and Largo to distract the main Imperial force while Alicia, Faldio and Squad 1 sneak into the base from the side using the animal trail, much to Alicia's dismay as she is not fond of Faldio. Advancing aggressively, Alicia is shot during the operation, but Faldio is able to help her to safety. However, she soon resumes fighting as her wound has healed quickly, much to the amazement of Faldio. The Gallian attack proves irresistible and Jaeger arrives with Imperial reinforcements to assist the reluctant Gregor in escaping. The Militia captures the base, but Welkin has to restrain Faldio from pursuing the retreating Imperials. After the battle, Alicia decides to keep the porcavian as a mascot and names it Hans.
6	"War Correspondent, Fight on!" Transliteration: "Jūgun Kisha, Funtō su!" (Japanese: 従軍記者, 奮闘す!)	May 9, 2009
War correspondent Irene Ellet arrives to interview Lieutenant Welkin Gunther for her radio show hosted by Radio GBS. However, Alicia is worried that Welkin, being absentminded and unorthodox in the way he handles things, may end up saying things that might tarnish the reputation of the Militia so she interferes with Welkin's interview, clashing with Irene repeatedly. After not being able to get useful information from Welkin's subordinates, Irene finally manages to corner Welkin in the men's bathroom, which leads to hilarity when Alicia storms in. Squad 7 celebrates with a barbecue courtesy of Irene, but a brawl breaks out between Squad 7 and Squad 1, until everyone settles down and emerges as friends. Irene finally gets her interview and figures out why Alicia was being so overprotective. To Alicia's relief, Irene's broadcast praises Squad 7, though she protests vehemently when Irene wants another interview.
7	"Darcsen Calamity"; Transliteration: "Darukusu no Saiyaku" (Japanese: ダルクスの災厄)	May 16, 2009
In an attempt to belittle the Gallian Militia's recent accomplishments compared to the Regular Army, General Damon assigns the Militia to the Barious Desert, over the protests of Captain Varrot. Welkin and Faldio debate the nature of the Darcsen Calamity and whether any of the legends represent what truly happened. The two Militia officers head out to visit the Valkyrur Ruins with Alicia, Ramal, and Isara but their jeep breaks down due to mechanical failure. While Welkin, Faldio and Alicia head to the ruins on foot, Isara and Ramal stay behind to repair the jeep. Unknown to them Selvaria and Maximilian are also present in another part of the ruins. Inevitably, Selvaria and Maxmillian come face to face with Welkin, Alicia, and Faldio.
8	"Looking Through History"; Transliteration: "Himotokareru Rekishi" (Japanese: 紐解かれる歴史)	May 23, 2009
When Faldio accuses the Imperials of trespassing on Gallian territory, Maximilian concedes the fact, but points out that the place truly belongs to the Valkyrur, namely Selvaria. When Maximilian attempts to walk away, Alicia threatens to shoot, but Selvaria is able to deflect her shot with her sword, leaving the Gallians stunned. Having completed their repairs, Isara and Ramal sense a large disturbance and hurry to the ruins, only to see a gigantic tank firing upon the ruins and causing the place to collapse with Welkin, Alicia and Faldio still inside. Elsewhere, Imperial forces under Gregor's command seize the mining city of Fouzen and execute the defeated Gallian Regular Army general. Gregor declares himself as dissatisfied with the easy victory, having wanted the Edelweiss as the opponent instead of incompetent Gallian Regulars. Having been separated from the others, Welkin manages to escape from the ruins with the help of Isara and Ramal, though Faldio and Alicia are still trapped. While waiting for help, Faldio tells Alicia of Welkin's past, highlighting the unusual ways he gets things done. They are able to hear Welkin outside but cannot dig their way out. When they inform Welkin that babysitter lizards have start gathering amidst the rubble, he realizes that there must be a way out. After some time, Alicia and Faldio emerge and rejoin the others but Alicia's gratitude to Welkin for being rescued gives way to annoyance when Welkin bombards Alicia with eager scientific questions about the babysitter lizards, leading Faldio to remark that Welkin is an "amazing guy".
9	"Azure Witch"; Transliteration: "Aoki Majo" (Japanese: 蒼き魔女)	May 30, 2009
With ulterior motives in mind, Imperial Central Command dispatches three junior officers to serve the Generals as aides. Karl Oswald, aide to Selvaria, finds his new commander intimidating and cold towards him. Meanwhile, Prince Maximilian is summoned back to the Imperial Capitol alone, much to Selvaria's chagrin. Sensing a plot behind Maximilian's recall and the three aides' sudden appearance, Jaeger suggests that Selvaria should act according to her instincts. However, Selvaria's initial attempt to go after the Prince is thwarted by Karl's insistence on following regulations. An assassin from the Capital attempts to murder Karl, who has succeeded in his mission of keeping Selvaria from Maximillian. Selvaria dispatches the assassin and Karl, in gratitude, confesses his secret orders to her. He proceeds to redeem himself by driving Selvaria and Jaeger to catch up with the Prince, where he subsequently witnesses Selvaria in action against assassins sent against Maximilian, and also discovers the reason behind her nickname, the "Azure Witch". Maximilian survives the attack unharmed, much to his older brother, the Crown Prince's consternation. Karl is relieved that Selvaria accepts him as her aide.
10	"Night of the Blizzard"; Transliteration: "Fubuki no Yoru" (Japanese: 吹雪の夜)	June 6, 2009
Alicia and Welkin undertake deep reconnaissance in territory held by the Imperials and are forced to take shelter in an abandoned cabin when a sudden mountain snowstorm comes. During the night, a single Imperial soldier enters the cabin and threatens use a live frag grenade to force them to surrender. Alicia, however, is able to convince the soldier to lower his weapon so she can treat his gunshot wounds. Meanwhile, everyone in Squad 7 feels worried that Alicia and Welkin have not returned from their mission. At the cabin, the wounded soldier explains that he joined the Imperial army to have a better life but grew disillusioned and was shot by his comrades while attempting to desert. Moved by Alicia's compassion, he re-inserts the safety pin in his grenade and before the soldier passes away, he tells them his name, Mikhail Weber. Alicia and Welkin reunite with Squad 7 after giving Mikhail a burial.
11	"Uninvited Guests"; Transliteration: "Manekarezaru Kyaku-tachi" (Japanese: 招かれざる客達)	June 13, 2009
Welkin and Faldio along with Alicia, Ramal and Isara are invited to attend an award ceremony at the Royal Palace in Randgriz. Selvaria and Jaeger infiltrate the ceremony under the guise of a rich couple from overseas. During the banquet, Faldio and Welkin receive commendations from Princess Cordelia for their actions in taking back Vasel and Kloden from the Imperial forces. Jaeger encounters Alicia outside the banquet hall and gives her a friendly warning. Alicia informs Welkin and Faldio of the presence of the Imperials Generals in the Royal Palace. After Cordelia returns to her quarters to rest, she is abducted by unknown assailants. Alicia, having gotten lost, stumbles across the kidnapping and is knocked unconscious and kidnapped as well. It is revealed that the kidnapping was a play for power arranged by Prime Minister Maurits von Borg with the cooperation of the Federation Ambassador.
12	"The Kidnapped Princess"; Transliteration: "Sarawareta Himegimi" (Japanese: さらわれた姫君)	June 20, 2009
After Faldio accuses Selvaria, Karl and Jaeger of staging the kidnapping, they come to realize that only the Gallian traitors and the Atlantic Federation gain by the abduction. Welkin proposes that they work together with the Imperial officers to rescue Alicia and Cordelia before they reach Atlantic Federation territory. With the Imperials acting as a distraction, the Gallians rescue Alicia and Princess Cordelia from Federation agents. Irene, who is in hiding, realizes that the disappearance of Cordelia is the apparent work of Borg and Federation Ambassador Townsend. Back in the palace, Cordelia, in a meeting with Faldio, Welkin, and Borg (unaware of his complicity) orders that news of her abduction kept secret from the Gallian media. Irene warns Alicia, Isara and Ramal of a deeper conspiracy at work.
13	"The Terrifying Mobile Fortress"; Transliteration: "Senritsu no Idō Yōsai" (Japanese: 戦慄の移動要塞)	June 27, 2009
General Damon orders the deployment of Gallian militia to Fouzen out of irritation at their growing popularity with the Gallian people and their success against the Imperials. While some of the Gallian Militia tanks attack Fouzen as a diversion, Welkin and Faldio lead their units in civilian clothes in order to covertly make contact with a Darcsen resistance group led by Zaka. After arriving in Fouzen, Rosie has issues with the Darcsen people because of her personal history. Zaka tells Rosie that he and his fellow Darcsens have long since become used to anti-Darcsen discrimination. Welkin, Faldio and Zaka proceed to make preparations to destroy General Gregor's armored train known as the "Equus", while simultaneously attacking the local Imperial headquarters and the Darcsen concentration camp.
14	"Choice of Fouzen"; Transliteration: "Fauzen no Sentaku" (Japanese: ファウゼンの選択)	July 4, 2009
The Gallians, led by Welkin and Faldio, and the Darcsen resistance, led by Zaka, assault the Imperial positions in Fouzen. Despite initial success in overwhelming the Imperial forces and rescuing the Darcsen prisoners, Gregor, the Equus and some surviving Imperial soldiers and tanks, are able to mobilize for the fight. When the Equus is lightly damaged by a planted explosives at the railway tracks, Gregor issues an ultimatum for the Gallians to withdraw from Fouzen or he will fire the Equus at the Darcsen civilians. Welkin is unsure what to do and Faldio orders the attack to continue. The Equus fires on the fleeing Darcsens. Isara and Ramal, who are in a hijacked Imperial tank, attack the Equus and eventually destroy it, killing Gregor. Despite the operation's success in liberating Fouzen, the deaths of the Darcsen civilians weighs heavily on the Gallians and the Darcsen resistance. Seeing the dead civilians, Rosie is traumatized as she starts to remember the deaths of her parents as a child.
15	"The Songstress' Past"; Transliteration: "Utahime no Kako" (Japanese: 歌姫の過去)	July 11, 2009
Captain Varrot instructs all Squad leaders to take a break following the Fouzen operation to recuperate and restore morale. When Rosie is asked by Squad 7 to represent them in the talent show, she refuses to do so if Isara will be present and storms out in anger. When she encounters Isara, Rosie tells her that Rosie's parents were killed by the Darcsen guerrillas when she was a child during the First Europan War. They wrongly accused her father of betraying their location to Imperials armed guerrillas after they had barged into her home to hide from Imperial soldiers. Isara decides to forgo the festivities if Rosie will agree to sing. Faldio orders Isara to accompany him to the barracks and Rosie sings regardless. After the concert, Faldio tells Alicia that he loves her.
16	"Unspoken Thoughts"; Transliteration: "Katarenakatta Omoi" (Japanese: 語れなかった思い)	July 18, 2009
After their defeat at Fouzen, the Imperials realize that war is turning against them, and if they do not regain their momentum, they will be pushed out of Gallia. Maximilian has a plan, but does not divulge the details to Jaeger. Meanwhile, back in Gallia, the Militia is put on alert due to suspicious Imperial movements. At camp, Largo notices the romantic tension between Welkin and Alicia. He takes Welkin to a makeshift bathhouse and tells Welkin that he was in a similar situation. During the previous war, he was caught in a love triangle between his best friend and Elaine Varrot, which ended when his friend sacrificed himself in battle and warns Welkin not to repeat his mistakes. Meanwhile, Isara goes to town for some shopping and Ramal decides to accompany her. Later that night, Alicia confronts Welkin and tells him about Faldio's declaration of love for her. She asks Welkin what he really thinks of her, and what he thinks she should do, but Welkin refuses to involve himself, claiming that he doesn't want to hurt Faldio.
17	"Gifts from The Spirits"; Transliteration: "Seireisetsu no Okurimono" (Japanese: 精霊節の贈り物)	July 25, 2009
The Gallian Militia receives new orders to attack the Imperial fortifications at the Mulberry Coast. However, due to the terrain, the only possible direction of attack is along the shoreline, which is completely exposed to the base's formidable defenses. Worse, the attack is scheduled to take place at the same time as the Holy Spirit Festival, a holiday that all Gallians celebrate. Squad 7 makes the best of the situation, and still manages to celebrate as the everyone exchanges gifts. Isara gives Rosie a handcrafted good luck charm doll, which Rosie accepts. Later, Isara manages to manufacture smoke shells for the Edelweiss to give Squad 7 a chance. During the attack, the smoke obscures the defender's line of sight and allows Squad 7 to breach the defenses. Emboldened by the Militia's success, the Regular Army finally joins the fight and forces the Imperials to retreat. During the attack Rosie avoids a sniper thanks to the good luck charm from Isara. As the battle ends, her attitude towards Isara begins to soften. As they converse, Isara is shot and killed by an Imperial sniper, much to Rosie's shock.
18	"August Rain"; Transliteration: "Hachigatsu no Ame" (Japanese: 八月の雨)	August 1, 2009
Welkin and Squad 7 pay their respects to Isara at her funeral. For her role in the Mulberry Coast victory, the Gallian military posthumously awards her the rank of Master Sergeant. Welkin orders Squad 7 to quickly move on and focus on dealing with the Imperials despite their grief. A distraught Ramal accuses Welkin of not caring about his sister's death. Rosie suffers from Survivor guilt in not being able to save Isara. General Damon demands that Welkin give him the details on making the smoke shells in three days or face punished. Alicia later discovers that the rest of Squad 7, angered at Damon's actions, plan to ambush him with a hidden hole in the ground to trap him. She is unable to convince them to desist and leaves to inform Welkin. Faldio manages to convince them otherwise, saying that the best way to humiliate people like Damon is keep winning battles and save Gallia. Faldio confronts Welkin about his refusal to deal with the death of Isara and Alicia's feelings, prompting Faldio to punch him.
19	"Tears"; Transliteration: "Namida" (Japanese: 涙)	August 8, 2009
Welkin and Alicia immerse themselves in their work in order to avoid the issue of their relationship. The rest of Squad 7 are aware of this, but are unable to do anything about it. Captain Varrot then informs Welkin that, in an effort to raise their morale, Squad 7 has been tasked with liberating Bruhl, the hometown of Welkin, Alicia and others in the squad. Zaka arrives at the base as the new driver for the Edelweiss. Meanwhile, as Welkin packs up Isara's belongings, he has flashbacks of his sister. After doing some research and piecing together clues he had witnessed earlier, Faldio is convinced that Alicia is a Valkyria. Squad 7 assaults Bruhl and quickly forces the Imperial garrison to surrender, liberating the town. Alicia finds Welkin at his old house, where he admits that Isara's death has been tearing him apart and he has been grieving since her death, yet he cannot find it in himself to cry. Alicia comforts Welkin by telling him he no longer needs to hold back his tears.
20	"Dearly Beloved"; Transliteration: "Itoshiki Hito" (Japanese: 愛しき人)	August 15, 2009
Maximillian informs his generals that the Emperor intends to remove him from command of the invasion force within one month. Given the short timeline until his removal, Maximillian decides to mobilize all of his forces and force Gallia into a decisive battle at the Naggiar Plains. Meanwhile in Randgriz, Ramal tries to deal with Zaka replacing Isara, and finds comfort in Faldio's advice. Soon, the Gallians face Maximillian's onslaught, led by his massive personal tank, the Batomys. Favoring his Regular Army, Damon orders Squad 7 to play a support role and stay away from the front. Princess Cordelia soon arrives after the first battle with a Ragnite shield and lance in hand; her presence inspires raising morale among the Gallians. With their vigor renewed, the Gallians force the Imperials back. Maximillian orders Selvaria, armed with Ragnite weapons, to retaliate. She destroys the entire Gallian force on the front, including most of Squad 1. Faldio is the only survivor after Ramal sacrifices himself to save his commander. When Alicia tries to comfort the traumatized Faldio he shoots her in the back.
21	"Ephemeral Bonds"; Transliteration: "Hakanaki Kizuna" (Japanese: はかなき絆)	August 22, 2009
Led by Selvaria, the Imperials continue to press the attack, repeatedly destroying the Gallian forces and not even Squad 7 is able to stop her. Meanwhile, back in the camp, a desperate Faldio takes Princess Cordelia hostage and seizes her Ragnite shield and lance. He reveals the wounded Alicia's Valkyria ancestry to Cordelia and tries to wake Alicia, with limited success (according to his research into the Valkyria, one has to be near death to awaken the Valkyria within, explaining why he shot her). It is only when she hears Welkin's desperate call for retreat over the radio that Alicia begins to react. Taking Cordelia's shield and lance, Alicia faces Selvaria on the battlefield. She defeats Selvaria and begins attacking the Imperial forces, destroying the Batomys in the process. Caught off guard by the appearance of a Valkyria on the Gallian side, Jaeger orders all Imperial forces to retreat. Selvaria rescues Maximilian from the ruined Batomys and withdraws from the battle. As the Gallians celebrate their unexpected victory, Welkin catches Alicia as she falls unconscious.
22	"Confusion"; Transliteration: "Tomadoi" (Japanese: とまどい)	August 29, 2009
As she recovers Alicia is kept isolated from Squad 7 by the Gallian Regular Army. General Damon decides to transfer her to the Regular Army and exploit her Valkyria powers for his own glory. Welkins confronts Faldio over his shooting of Alicia, with Faldio replying that he had no other choice or Gallia would have lost. Meanwhile, Selvaria fumes over her failure to protect Maximilian, while the Imperial Prince is determined to continue the invasion despite the loss at Naggiar. He still has a trump card in the form of a massive armored vehicle, the Marmotah. At the Gallian camp, the members of Squad 7 are uncertain about Alicia and her newly awakened Valkyrur powers. Having fled her confinement and the General's statement that her squad will not welcome her, Alicia inadvertently overhears their conversation. In the midst of the confusion and misunderstanding that follows, Alicia flees, no longer certain of her place in the squad. In tears, she decides to accept the transfer to the Regular Army, despite Welkin's pleas to the contrary.
23	"The Shape of Love"; Transliteration: "Ai no Katachi" (Japanese: 愛のかたち)	September 5, 2009
With Alicia on their side, the Gallian Regular Army scores numerous victories over the Imperials until they are forced back to their final stronghold in Gallia: Ghirlandio. Knowing his failures will be exploited by the Emperor and the Crown Prince, Maximilian declares that he is no longer the Second Prince of the Empire, but the Emperor of his own nation that he will create. Selvaria is still troubled by her failure at Naggiar, but still believes in Maximilian out of devotion and love. Meanwhile, at the Gallian camp, Welkin and Squad 7 are trying to contact Alicia, but are stopped by Regular Army officers. Squad 7 attempts to force the issue, but instead cause a brawl. Cordelia pardons Faldio, and then meets with Alicia who requests that Cordelia ensure the safety of Squad 7 and Faldio until the end of the war. To fulfill her promise to Alicia, Cordelia requests that Squad 7 be assigned as her personal guard. Alicia and the Gallian Regular Army travel to Ghirlandio, where they advance against Selvaria and the Imperials.
24	"Determination"; Transliteration: "Ketsui" (Japanese: 決意)	September 12, 2009
Alicia and Selvaria meet for a final showdown. As they battle, they both recognize one other from the Imperial lab where they were held as children. Selvaria, being considered the most powerful, was kept at the lab while the rest of the orphans including Alicia were sent away to foster families. Selvaria managed to escape from the lab and was taken into the care of Maximilian. During the battle, Selvaria, fighting for Maximilian, begins to gain ground on Alicia. Nearly defeated, Alicia suddenly realizes that she has something precious to fight for as well: Squad 7 and Welkin. With her strength renewed, Alicia defeats Selvaria with one last strike. Selvaria understands that, defeated, she is of no use to Maximilian, and sacrifices herself to create a massive explosion, destroying the Gallian Regular Army and General Damon. Meanwhile, Maximilian attempts to negotiate a peace treaty with Cordelia, demanding that she marry him so that he has access to the Valkyrur bloodline, but Cordelia reveals that she is in fact a Darcsen. Shocked, Maximilian orders the Marmotah to attack Randgriz. Karl confronts Maximilian about his callousness towards the loss of Selvaria, but the prince shoots Karl dead, declaring no one will stand in his way.
25	"The ones that should be protected" Transliteration: "Mamorubeki Mono" (Japanese: 護るべきもの)	September 19, 2009
The Gallian and Imperial forces battle each other in the streets of Randgriz. However, Maximllian is able to seize the Holy Lance of the Valkyrur, a massive Ragnite weapon which was hidden inside the structure of Randgriz Palace, and equip it as the main cannon of the Marmotah. After demonstrating the power of the lance by demolishing a hill, Maximlian calls on the Gallians to surrender or be destroyed. Jaeger confronts Maximilian about his lust for power, but Maximilian replies that power is the only thing one needs. He also tells Jaeger that he executed Karl for standing in his way, and threatens Jaeger with the same fate should he prove disloyal. Marmotah fires on Randgriz, but is stopped by Alicia, who survived the explosion at Ghirlandio. Seriously weakened from her battle with Selvaria, Alicia faints after blocking a second shot, and is captured by the Imperials. Jaeger declares he will no longer serve Maxmillian and is shot. Welkin, Faldio and Squad 7 storm the Marmotah in an effort to save Alicia.
26	"Decisive Battle"; Transliteration: "Kessen" (Japanese: 決戦)	September 26, 2009
Inside the Marmotah, Squad 7 engages the Imperials to allow Faldio and Welkin to search for Alicia. Faldio is shot protecting Welkin and sacrifices himself with a grenade to hold off the Imperials. Alicia is brought in front of Maximilian and he tries to convince her to join him but Alicia calls him a pathetic fool. When Welkin finds Alicia tied up on the deck of the Marmota, Maximilian attacks him using the Artificial Valkyrian System drawing power from the Holy Lance. He frees Alicia and challenges her and Welkin to a duel to demonstrate the power of his superior technology. Alicia regains her strength and unleashes her Valkyrian flame which overloads the system and injures Maximilian. Refusing to surrender, Maximilian hurls himself to his death and the Marmotah begins to collapse. Alicia pleads Welkin to leave her because she feels she can no longer can control the burning Valkyrian flame. However, Welkin embraces and kisses her, extinguishing the flame. After the battle, the Empire and Gallia sign a peace treaty, ending the seven month Gallian War. Princess Cordelia is cheered by the citizens of Gallian in her coronation as Archduchess despite her Darcsen heritage being revealed. With the Militia disbanded, all of the members of Squad 7 go their separate ways. Welkin and Alicia return to Bruhl, promising to live and honor the memories of those that died in the war.
OVA–1	"The Wound Taken for Someone's Sake (Part 1)"; Transliteration: "Ta ga Tame no Jūsō" (Japanese: 誰かの酒のために取られた創傷（その1）)	April 13, 2011
Low on supplies and on the run from the Gallian Regular Army, The 422nd squad, aka "The Nameless", meet a girl running from the town of Aslone, which was just captured by Imperial Troops, and their leader, Kurt Irving decide that they will retake it by themselves, knowing that the main force will not come to their aid. Elsewhere, Maximilian sends the Darcsen unit Calamity Raven to guard two experimental large artillery pieces at Dillsburg. After liberating Aslone, the Nameless leave the prisoners and their equipment on the villagers' custody and reclaim some supplies sent by their leader, Lt. Crowe. The following day, Squad 7 and Gallian regulars assault Dillsburg in early morning fog, but the artillery pieces rout the main Gallian force and while coming to help them, the Nameless rescue Isara, who was being pursued by Imperial soldiers.
OVA–2	"The Wound Taken for Someone's Sake (Part 2)"; Transliteration: "Ta ga Tame no Jūsō" (Japanese: 誰かの酒のために取られた創傷（その2）)	July 6, 2011
Upon being informed of the situation, the Nameless decide to take advantage of a narrow mountain pass to attack the Dillsburg base by surprise, but Gusurg of the Calamity Raven predicts their course of action and prepares an ambush. When a Gallian platoon recklessly attempts to charge forward, Riela Marcelis uses her Valkyrian powers to protect them, while destroying one of the artillery pieces. Thanks to a distraction planned by Kurt, Gusurg is ordered to retreat, just as he had the Nameless pinned down. After returning Isara safely to Squad 7, the Nameless then launch an attack on the second artillery piece, which is destroyed by a long range shot from the Edelweiss. However, the desperate enemy commander brings forth a third artillery piece which is destroyed by a barrage of rockets from Imca, killing him as well. The main Gallian force then occupies the base, while Calamity Raven takes the opportunity to retreat. Back at Guirlandaio Fortress, Selvaria is informed by Maximillian that the time for showing her true powers is at hand, while the Nameless take their leave, with only the members of Squad 7 knowing that victory in this battle was only possible thanks to them.

== Valkyria Chronicles Theater OVA episodes ==
No.	Title	Original release date
1	"A Day at the Beach"; Transliteration: "Umibe de no Ichi Nichi" (Japanese: 海辺での一日)	August 5, 2009
A DVD episode with Alicia Melchiott, Isara Gunther, Edy Nelson, and the girls of Squad 7. They comment about their swimsuits, play a game of competitive volleyball, and do other leisure activities. Selvaria Bles also makes an end appearance.
2	"Gallia's Summer Festival"; Transliteration: "Garia no Natsuyasumi" (Japanese: ガリアの夏祭典)	September 2, 2009
Welkin, Faldio, and Ramal dress in fundoshi for a Gallian festival held in the city of Touyo. Isara and Alicia dress in pretty kimono; Ramal blushes at the sight of Isara's appearance. During the festival, Welkin and Alicia get separated from everyone else; both enjoy a scene of fireworks. Selvaria continues to long for Maximillan's appearance to be by her side.
3	"Shock! Prized Photos!"; Transliteration: "Shōgeki!! Otakara Shashin" (Japanese: 衝撃!!お宝写真)	October 7, 2009
Weary Squad 7 boys give a tiring sigh in the military lounge. Suddenly, Irene Ellet makes an appearance, offering the boys some attractive pictures of the Squad 7 girls. The boys immediately fancy her offer; Ramal stares at a picture of Isara, and Homer lauds at his abused facial expression after being hit by Edy. Further pictures show other extremes, typicalities, and cuteness of the Squad 7 girls, only to have Irene lull them in further by suggesting she has better pictures. A picture of Alicia sleeping is revealed, only to have Alicia herself show up to give Irene a hard rant... and a desire for Welkin's picture.
4	"Selvaria's Wonderful Day Off!"; Transliteration: "Seruvaria no Kareinaru Kyūjitsu" (Japanese: セルベリアの華麗なる休日)	November 4, 2009
Selvaria wakes up, bored from staring at multiples of her typical military dress in her closet. She then summons her deputy Karl to do some research on how civilians dress and live. Karl becomes excited and brings back a crate load of clothes which consist of doctor's clothing, Squad 7 uniforms, and typical civilian dresses. The final dress is Maximilian's gown, where Selvaria mimics Maximillan's words and actions in an attempt to understand him more. She further acts like Maximillan in pure obsession with him, only to have Maximillan take a slight peek through the door...
5	"The Fearsome Joker!"; Transliteration: "Senritsu no Jōkā" (Japanese: 戦慄のジョーカー)	December 2, 2009
During a thunderstorm at the Citadel at Ghirlandaio, Selvaria, Maximilian, General Gregor, and General Jaeger play an intense game of "Old Man", an improvisation of old maid. They all mention references to their victories; Gregor and Jaeger quickly make their exit for the round. All that remains is Selvaria and Maximillan, where Selvaria cannot get rid of her affection for Maximillan. In a desperate attempt to prevent her from losing the game, she moves her hand around in almost unconscious fashion. She ends up losing, but they continue to play until the next morning, with Maximillan not paying any attention to the time...
6	"Be On Guard in the Girls' Bath!?"; Transliteration: "Joshi Furo wa Goyōshin!?" (Japanese: 女子風呂はご用心!?)	January 13, 2010
Marina, Alicia, Edy, Rosie, and Susie are taking a hot bath in a private tent. Everyone prepares to leave until Captain Varrot suddenly appears in front of them, asking everybody to remain in the bath longer. As everybody remains silent with the captain, Varrot talks about Largo, who worked in the same company in the first Europan War. She talks about how Largo would often be turned down by her. Due to Largo's passion for vegetables, he would use vegetable flowers instead of roses... and then continue to discuss where those flowers came from...and then how cute she was holding one of the flowers... and then everybody passes out from being in the hot bath too long...
7	"Rebirth! Squad 7"; Transliteration: "Shinsei! Dai 7 Shōtai" (Japanese: 新生!第7小隊)	February 3, 2010
At the Gallian Military Base, Captain Varrot gazes outside of the window with her eyes closed...only to look back at Squad 7 with Hans' pig ears... They start speaking ~buhii~ as the main communication language.. All of Squad 7 stands at attention with each character having the same pig ears. Hans makes his entrance strapped to Alicia, speaking Japanese orders to the rest of the crew... only to have the rest of the squad answer ~buhii~ in agreement. All discussions are comprehended in ~buhii~ (fortunately a Japanese translation of the dialogue is present). All of Squad 7 praises Hans for his decisive efforts to keep Squad 7 in top form... Only to appear as an awkward dream for a sleeping Hans...
8	"Cordelia's Secret!"; Transliteration: "Kōderia no Himitsu!" (Japanese: コーデリアの秘密！)	March 3, 2010
Princess Cordelia contemplates to herself about meeting Lt. Welkin for the first time in a long while. She tries to surprise him...using a collection of headgear. She starts off with Gekota, then to a lizard, to bunny ears, cat headgear, and so on. After trying on various headgears, she falls asleep only to be late for her English fluency exam. As she runs to make her exam, her waitress casually greets her...only to realize something's odd...and to see Maurtis von Borg wear her crown...and realize that he is bald after seeing a wig right beside him...
9	"Vowing Eternity (Epilogue)"; Transliteration: "Eien o Chikatte" (Japanese: 永遠を誓って（エピローグ）)	April 7, 2010
The episode starts with a letter from Alicia to Susie. Alicia narrates about how all the Squad 7 members are and what the members are doing after the war. She also mentions how she has to put off the marriage ceremony until she and Welkin finish respective university exams. As Alicia and Welkin poke fun at each other in Bruhl, Largo and Rosie make an unexpected visit, as well as the rest of Squad 7. They all congratulate Alicia and Welkin on their engagement, along with suggesting them to hold the marriage ceremony right away. A very makeshift wedding gown is made, and the couple become officially married in the sunset...
