= Valkyria Chronicles 4 =

2018 video game

- Promotional flyer
- Developers: Sega; Media.Vision (Note: Ported to Windows by Hardlight)
- Publisher: Sega
- Directors: Kohei Yamashita; Masaya Kobayashi
- Producer: Kei Mikami
- Artist: Yukihiko Ito
- Composer: Hitoshi Sakimoto
- Series: Valkyria Chronicles
- Platforms: PlayStation 4; Nintendo Switch; Windows; Xbox One; Stadia; Amazon Luna
- Release: March 21, 2018: PlayStation 4; JP: March 21, 2018; WW: September 25, 2018 Nintendo Switch; WW: September 25, 2018; JP: September 27, 2018 Windows; WW: September 25, 2018 Xbox One; NA/PAL: September 25, 2018 Stadia; WW: December 8, 2020 Amazon Luna; US: July 8, 2021
- Genre: Tactical role-playing
- Mode: Single-player

Valkyria Chronicles 4 (Note: Known in Japan as Senjō no Varukyuria 4: Eastern Front (Japanese: 戦場のヴァルキュリア4: Eastern Front; lit. Valkyria of the Battlefield 4: Eastern Front)) is a tactical role-playing video game developed and published by Sega, with assistance from Media.Vision. Part of the Valkyria Chronicles series, it was released in Japan for the PlayStation 4 in March 2018, and worldwide, in addition for the Nintendo Switch, Windows, and Xbox One in September 2018. It was also ported to Stadia on December 8, 2020, and to Amazon Luna on July 8, 2021.

== Gameplay ==
The use of the Brave System. Here, Aladdin is shot by the enemy and the options available are "Inspire" and "Counter". The icon in the middle is the timer.

Valkyria Chronicles 4 is a strategy game in the style of the first three games in the series. It introduces a new soldier class known as the Grenadier, who can fire mortar rounds at enemies. If allied soldiers are present to provide battlefield information, they can fire without being seen by hostile forces. When a soldier in your army is on the verge of death, there is a fixed chance that a new system called "Brave" will be activated. When used, players can choose to either restore one Command Point (CP) and increase the ability of a nearby ally, counter the enemy's attack (if downed on enemy's turn) or restore Action Points (AP) to the unit and enable it to move and attack once in an invincible state (if downed on player's turn).

== Plot ==
Claude Wallace and his childhood friends Kai Shulen and Raz join the Federation Army in order to fight the Empire in the Second Europan War, both to protect their home country of Gallia and avenge an Imperial attack on their hometown of Hafen. However, during training, Kai mysteriously disappears, leaving his sister Leena to take his place as "Kai". Claude, Raz, and Leena are able to pass training and join the elite Ranger Corps, with Claude being assigned command of Squad E.

Squad E is then informed that the Empire has the upper hand, capturing a large amount of Federation territory as well as initiating an invasion of Gallia. Federation leaders decide to put all of their resources into Operation Northern Cross, a massive offensive with the objective of pushing straight to the Imperial capital of Schwartzgrad. The operation is initially successful, with Squad E managing to push through Imperial territory. Along the way, they are joined by another childhood friend, Riley Miller. Riley is initially mistrustful of Claude due to him running away from a fire that killed Riley's family, but eventually accepts his command when he proves his worth as a leader. Squad E continues the offensive by breaking the Siegval Line, Schwartzgrad's final line of defense. Along the way, they battle the elite Imperial tank unit Ausbruch, led by Klaus Walz, who considers Claude a worthy rival. However, despite the Federation's early success, winter comes earlier than expected, halting the unprepared Federation forces. Crippled by the snow and cold and weakened by stretched supply lines, the Federation forces are quickly routed by a massive Imperial counterattack. Squad E is forced to flee to the coast, where they are rescued by a trio of highly advanced Federation snow cruisers; massive warships that can travel over the ice of the Crystal Sea.

After coming aboard one of the cruisers, the Centurion, Claude is assigned by Captain Morgen to protect the warship as the fleet carries out Operation Cygnus, a contingency plan to attack Schwartzgrad from the sea in case Operation Northern Cross failed. Meanwhile, Walz is assigned to X-0, an elite Imperial science unit led by Lord Heinrich Belgar. Belgar tasks Walz with intercepting and capturing the Federation fleet, and teams him up with his chief strategic officer, Forseti and the Valkyria Crymaria. Forseti leads an attack on the fleet, prompting Squad E to respond, but Crymaria intervenes against Forseti's orders, and she loses control of her powers, destroying one of the cruisers and heavily damaging the Centurion before it escapes. Forseti is furious since their mission was to capture the cruisers intact, and he reveals to Walz that he has planted his sister as a spy aboard the Centurion in order to track its movements. Walz then witnesses how Crymaria is mistreated by her handlers and begins to show her compassion.

Meanwhile, the crew of the Centurion tries to repair the damage to their ship, but its main reactor has been knocked offline, forcing the ship to run at a fraction of its speed on the backup engine. At the same time, Riley finds a young amnesiac girl named Angie in the engine room, and the crew assumes her to be a stowaway. Squad E begins to take a liking to Angie as she befriends everybody. During a raid on an Imperial supply base, Angie sneaks ashore and meets Crymaria, who realizes Angie is a Valkyria as well. It is also revealed that Forseti is the real Kai, now working for the Empire and manipulating Leena into spying for him. Leena decides to cut ties with Forseti, declaring her brother dead. Claude then receives word that the third ship in the fleet is under attack. Despite knowing it is a trap, Squad E attempts to rescue the ship, but it self destructs, creating a massive explosion. Knowing that the Centurion can't escape the blast unless at full speed, Angie places herself inside the reactor, revealing herself to be the power source. Captain Morgen is wounded during the fighting and reveals the true scope of Operation Cygnus to Claude. The reactors that power the snow cruisers use energy given off by Valkyria placed inside them. In addition, the reactors also double as weapons dubbed the "A2 bomb", powerful enough to destroy an entire city. Operation Cygnus' true objective isn't to invade Schwartzgrad, but completely destroy it with the A2 bomb.

Claude is placed in command of the Centurion and he reluctantly proceeds with the mission. Walz and Crymaria attempt to stop him but are defeated. Crymaria loses control of her powers again after believing Walz was killed, but he appears and helps calm her down, promising her that they will live a happy life together after the war. The Centurion continues towards Schwartzgrad but is caught in a trap. Raz sacrifices himself to disable the trap and the ship continues on, plowing into the center of Schwartzgrad. Forseti boards the ship, intent on rescuing Angie since he had previously been part of the secret Federation program to acquire Valkyria for the reactor experiments, and his guilt motivated him to defect to the Empire. Leena shoots and kills Forseti before he can reach the reactor. Claude then prepares to detonate the A2 bomb, but the Empire offers a ceasefire to the Federation, ending the war with no clear victor. Belgar ignores the ceasefire and attacks the Centurion, obsessed with seizing its reactor and perfecting the technology. Squad E is able to defeat and kill Belgar, but the Centurion is severely damaged and begins to sink. Claude is able to narrowly rescue Angie and Riley from the sinking ship.

Afterwards, the Second Europan War comes to an end with neither the Federation nor Empire achieving a decisive victory, but everybody is glad to see peace return. Walz lives happily with Crymaria at his side. Squad E disbands and the survivors pursue their own interests while Claude, Riley, Leena, and Angie return to Hafen to live in peace.

== Development ==
The game was produced by Kei Mikami, who was involved in the production of Valkyria Revolution, and directed by Kohei Yamashita. The game's soundtrack was written by series composer Hitoshi Sakimoto, with the main theme, "Light Up My Life", being composed by Shilo and written and performed by Mai Kuraki.

The development began around the end of 2015, after Yamashita had finished planning the project. From the start, the developers had the goal to build a worldwide audience for the Valkyria Chronicles series, with the concept of returning to the style of the original Valkyria Chronicles game while building upon developments from later games in the series: whereas the PlayStation Portable game Valkyria Chronicles II had been developed specifically with a Japanese audience in mind due to the popularity of the platform in that region, with "fantastical" characters and a school setting, Valkyria Chronicles 4 uses a more grounded military setting with characters intended to feel like real people.

In preparation for the game, the development team studied records of World War II troops, and used them as reference material. As part of the project, the developers began with developing Valkyria Chronicles Remastered for the PlayStation 4, to allow players to experience the main series' gameplay on a modern platform. Mikami states that the game touches on what was happening to the rest of Europa during the war. For the Japanese release, a series anniversary downloadable content pack was released, which includes a 25 track soundtrack CD that includes musical tracks from all four games.

To promote the game's release in Japan, Sony released limited edition PlayStation 4 consoles themed around the game.

== Reception ==
Reception

Aggregate score
Aggregator	Score
Metacritic	(NS) 82/100 (PC) 83/100 (PS4) 85/100 (XONE) 81/100

Review scores
Publication	Score
Destructoid	8/10
Game Informer	9/10
GameSpot	8/10
IGN	8.7/10
Nintendo Life	8/10
Push Square	9/10
Screen Rant	4/5
TrustedReviews	4/5

Valkyria Chronicles 4 received "generally favorable reviews", according to review aggregator Metacritic.

=== Sales ===
During its initial March release on PS4, the game sold 76,778 physical copies within its first three weeks in Japan. After its release on the Switch in September, the game sold 5,596 physical copies within its first week in Japan.

In June 2020, it is revealed by Sega that over one million copies of Valkyria Chronicles 4 have been sold worldwide on all platforms.

=== Accolades ===
The game was nominated for "Best Strategy Game" at The Game Awards 2018, and for "Strategy Title of the Year" at the Australian Games Awards, and won the award for "Game, Franchise Role Playing" at the National Academy of Video Game Trade Reviewers Awards, whereas its other nomination was for "Original Light Mix Score, Franchise".
