= Maiko Sakae =

Japanese musician

- Born: 24 July 1986 (age 40); Suita, Osaka, Japan
- Genres: Pop, rock
- Occupations: Singer, musician
- Years active: 1997—present
- Label: SME Records

Maiko Sakae (栄 舞子) is a Japanese pop singer. She was a bassist and vocalist for the all-female pop rock band Zone. She is also former lead singer and one of two bassists for the pop/rock band Maria.

== Biography ==
Maiko sang solo on two songs for Zone: "Sae Zuri (Bird Chirping)" and "Like". She also wrote the lyrics for "Chiisa na Uta (Little Song)", Maria's first single, and also wrote the lyrics for the "Sora (Sky)".
