= Valkyria Chronicles =

Military-themed tactical role-playing video game series

- The logo for the first game in the series.
- Genre: Tactical role-playing
- Developers: Sega; Media.Vision
- Publisher: Sega
- Creators: Ryutaro Nonaka; Shuntaro Tanaka
- Platforms: PlayStation 3, PlayStation 4, Microsoft Windows, PlayStation Portable, PlayStation Vita, Web browser, Android, iOS, Xbox One, Nintendo Switch, Stadia, Amazon Luna
- First release: Valkyria Chronicles; April 24, 2008
- Latest release: Valkyria Chronicles 4 March 21, 2018

Valkyria Chronicles (Note: Known in Japan as Senjō no Varukyuria (Japanese: 戦場のヴァルキュリア; lit. Valkyria of the Battlefield)) is a series of military-themed tactical role-playing video games created by Ryutaro Nonaka and Shuntaro Tanaka, and developed by Sega. The series began with Valkyria Chronicles, which was released for the PlayStation 3 in 2008, and later for Microsoft Windows, PlayStation 4 and the Nintendo Switch. Two sequels have been released on the PlayStation Portable, with the latest installment, Valkyria Chronicles 4, released for the PlayStation 4, Xbox One, Nintendo Switch and Microsoft Windows, and later for Stadia and Amazon Luna. The series has also been expanded into anime and manga media.

== Setting ==
The main line of games uses a turn based system known as the BLiTZ (Battle of Live Tactical Zones) and is set in Europa, a fictional continent loosely based on Europe. A conflict known as the Second Europan War takes place between the superpowers of the Atlantic Federation, a group of democracies from the western part of the continent, and the East Europan Imperial Alliance, an imperialistic monarchy. Both sides covet the natural resources of the neutral nation of Gallia, which leads to an invasion from the Empire. The first, third, and fourth games of the series follow the exploits of distinct groups of soldiers on different fronts of the Second Europan War, fighting the Imperial forces, while the second game is set after the war. The games were designed using Sega's CANVAS graphics engine, making the visuals resemble pencil drawn paintings in motion. Valkyria Revolution is set in an alternate version of Europa with different lore, characters, and gameplay.

== Games ==
Valkyria Chronicles debuted on PlayStation 3, with the original game later made available on Microsoft Windows, PlayStation 4 and Nintendo Switch. Sega opted to continue the series on PlayStation Portable instead of on PlayStation 3. However, Valkyria Chronicles 4 was released on the PlayStation 4, Xbox One, Microsoft Windows and Nintendo Switch, and was later ported to Stadia and Amazon Luna, it was the first Valkyria Chronicles game to debut on a Nintendo platform and Microsoft Windows in the West.

=== Main series ===
Release timeline
2008	Valkyria Chronicles
2009
2010	Valkyria Chronicles II
2011	Valkyria Chronicles III
2012	Valkyria Chronicles Duel
2013
2014
2015
2016
2017
2018	Valkyria Chronicles 4

==== Valkyria Chronicles ====
The first main entry in the series was originally released for the PlayStation 3 and later ported to Microsoft Windows, PlayStation 4, and Nintendo Switch. The Windows port was developed by Little Stone Software. It takes place in Europa, a fictional continent based on Europe, during the beginning of World War II. Because of its abundance of Ragnite ore, which takes the place of petroleum in the game setting, the neutral nation of Gallia comes under attack from the East Europan Imperial Alliance, which is itself engaged in a war with the Atlantic Federation. Players take control of a unit of the Gallian Militia, dedicated to repelling the invasion.

==== Valkyria Chronicles II ====
The second main entry was moved to the PlayStation Portable platform. Story-wise, it takes place two years after the events of the first game, with a fight that breaks loose against the Gallian Revolutionary Army and the Regular Army in a bid to remove Cordelia from the throne. The game's story focuses on a military academy as its cadets seek to prevent an ethnic cleansing campaign by a ruthless rebel group.

==== Valkyria Chronicles III ====
The third main entry was also released on the PlayStation Portable. However, it takes place during the events of the first game. The story follows the "Nameless", a penal military unit serving the nation of Gallia during the Second Europan War who perform secret black operations and are pitted against the Imperial unit "Calamity Raven". Unlike the previous installments, it did not have an official release outside of Japan.

==== Valkyria Chronicles 4 ====
The fourth main entry was released on the PC, PlayStation 4, Xbox One, and Nintendo Switch in 2018. While taking place during the events of the first and third game, Valkyria Chronicles 4 focuses on a group of Gallian soldiers enlisted in the Atlantic Federation, the other major superpower during the events of the war, that enacts a bold plan to strike at the imperial capital in order to end the conflict.

=== Spinoffs ===
==== Valkyria Chronicles Duel ====
Valkyria Chronicles Duel (戦場のヴァルキュリアDUEL, Senjō no Varukyuria Duel; lit. Valkyria of the Battlefield Duel), also known as Valkyria Chronicles D or Valkyria Duel, was a browser and mobile game released only in Japan. It was a free browser-based/Android/iOS game, with radically different gameplay, focusing more on character management of war troops similar to sports team management simulations. It was released on July 26, 2012 (August 17 on Android and September 24 on iOS) and shut down on April 22, 2015.

==== Valkyria Revolution ====
Valkyria Revolution was released on PlayStation 4 and PlayStation Vita on January 19, 2017, in Japan. It is considered a spin-off, with a storyline separate from the main series, taking place in the fictional country of Jutland. It was released in North America and Europe on June 27, 2017, and June 30, 2017, respectively for the PlayStation 4, PlayStation Vita and Xbox One, making it the first series game to be on a Microsoft console, alongside the PlayStation versions.

== Other media ==
=== Valkyria Chronicles ===
- Valkyria Chronicles
- Valkyria Chronicles volume 1 manga cover

戦場のヴァルキュリア -Gallian Chronicles- (Senjō no Varukyuria -Gallian Chronicles-)
- Genre: Action, drama, comedy, romance, military
- Created by: Sega
Further information
Manga
Wish Your Smile
Written by	Sega
Illustrated by	Kyusei Tokito
Published by	Enterbrain
Magazine	Comic B's Log
Original run	November 12, 2008 – January 22, 2010
Volumes	2
Manga
Written by	En Kito
Published by	Kadokawa Shoten
Magazine	Comp Ace
Original run	November 26, 2008 – March 26, 2010
Volumes	4
Anime television series
Directed by	Yasutaka Yamamoto
Written by	Michiko Yokote
Studio	A-1 Pictures
Original network	MBS, Animax
Original run	April 4, 2009 – September 26, 2009
Episodes	26 + 9 OVA
Manga
Anthology Comic
Written by	Sega
Illustrated by	Various artists
Published by	Enterbrain
Magazine	Bros Comics EX
Published	December 28, 2009
Volumes	1
Manga
4-koma Anthology
Written by	Sega
Illustrated by	Various artists
Published by	Enterbrain
Magazine	Bros Comics EX
Published	March 10, 2010
Volumes	1

==== Manga ====
Four manga adaptations have been published based on the first game. The first is Valkyria Chronicles: Wish Your Smile, serialized by Enterbrain's Comic B's Log magazine and centering on two characters made for the manga: Mintz, an orphan and engineer, and Julius Klose, a sniper, with both of them in the Gallian army's militia force. It was illustrated by Kyusei Tokito, and was serialized from November 12, 2008, to January 22, 2010, with two compilation volumes released on May 1, 2009, and March 1, 2010.

The second manga, titled the same as the game, was illustrated by En Kito. Similar to the anime, it is a loose adaptation of the original video game, with some story details diverging from the source material. It was serialized by Kadokawa Shoten from November 26, 2008, to March 26, 2010, in Comp Ace magazine and later compiled in four volumes.

The third manga is Valkyria Chronicles: Anthology Comic, published by the Bros Comics EX comic label on December 28, 2009, in one volume.

The fourth manga is Valkyria Chronicles: 4-koma Anthology, published by the Bros Comics EX comic label on March 10, 2010, in one volume.

==== Anime ====
The anime adaptation of the first game premiered on April 4, 2009 and was produced by Aniplex's A-1 Pictures. The series was directed by Yasutaka Yamamoto and written by Michiko Yokote under the Project Valkyria Group. Valkyria Chronicles was aired on Animax, Tokyo MX, MBS, CBC, Chiba TV, Television Kanagawa, Television Hokkaido, BS11, and TVQ Kyushu Broadcasting. Generally following the storyline of the original game, the anime version differs from its source in terms of characterization of main players such as Alicia, and introduces a character unique to the anime, Ramal Valt. While retaining elements of the CANVAS Engine's look, the characters were redesigned for the anime by Atsuko Watanabe.

The original score for the anime is composed and conducted by the game's composer Hitoshi Sakimoto and performed by the Czech Film Orchestra. The first opening theme song, "Asu e no Kizuna" was performed by Animax Anison Grand Prix winner Catherine St. Onge, under her chosen moniker of Himeka. A CD single of the song was released on May 27, 2009. The first ending theme, "Ano Kaze ni Notte" (アノ風ニノッテ; "Riding on that Wind") was sung by the band Pe'zmoku with a CD single released on May 27, 2009, in a regular and special edition. Maria performed the series's second opening theme, "Kanashimi Rensa" (カナシミレンサ; "Chain of Sorrow"), which was used from the 14th episode on. The second ending song, "Hitotsu no Negai" (ひとつの願い; "A Single Wish"), was sung by Hikari Inoue beginning from Episode 14 until Episode 25. Episode 26's ending song was "Brightest Morning", also performed by Hikari Inoue. CD singles for "Kanashimi Rensa" and "Hitotsu no Negai" were released on August 12, 2009, and August 5, 2009.

Region 2 DVDs of all 26 episodes were released across nine volumes, beginning on August 5, 2009, and concluding on April 7, 2010. Each DVD volume contained a Valkyria Chronicles Theater OVA mini-episode. A BD-box was released on April 27, 2011.

==== Drama CD ====
Two Valkyria Chronicles Drama CDs have been released. The first was released on July 24, 2009, and the second was released on October 7, 2009.

=== Valkyria Chronicles II ===
- Valkyria Chronicles II

戦場のヴァルキュリア2 (Senjō no Varukyuria Tsū)
- Genre: Action, drama, comedy, romance, military
Further information
Manga
Sōkō no Aliasse
Written by	Sega
Illustrated by	Daisuke Shido
Published by	ASCII Media Works
Magazine	Dengeki Maoh
Original run	June 2010 – June 2011
Volumes	2
Manga
Written by	Sega
Illustrated by	Watari
Published by	Kadokawa Shoten
Magazine	Comp Ace
Original run	October 2010 – September 2011
Volumes	2
Manga
Our Only Days
Written by	Sega
Illustrated by	Mekki Kuroyama
Published by	Enterbrain
Magazine	Comics B's-Log Air Raid
Original run	May 28, 2010 – January 2011
Volumes	2

Three manga adaptations of the second game were released by Sega in Japan.

The first one released was Valkyria Chronicles II Sōkō no Aliasse (戦場のヴァルキュリア2 蒼光のエイリアス, Senjō no Varukyuria 2 Sōkō no Eiriasu; lit. Valkyria of the Battlefield 2: Aliasse of the Blue Light), drawn by Daisuke Shido and serialised in Dengeki Maoh between June 2010 and June 2011 issues, in which the story follows the developing friendship between the Valkyrian Aliasse, and her Darcsen classmate Magari. The first volume was published in January 2011 and the second volume was published on May 27, 2011.

The next manga is called Valkyria Chronicles II (戦場のヴァルキュリア2, Senjō no Varukyuria 2). The story was written by Daiki Saito and the artwork was done by Watari. It was serialised in Comp Ace from October 2010 to September 2011 issues, and its storyline is loosely based on the game, with emphasis on the relationship between Avan and his brother. The first volume was published on January 26, 2011, and the second volume was published on September 21, 2011.

Another manga, named Valkyria Chronicles II: Our Only Days (戦場のヴァルキュリア2 -our only days-, Senjō no Varukyuria 2 -our only days-), was illustrated by Mekki Kuroyama and was serialised as a webcomic in Comics B's-Log Air Raid from May 28, 2010, to January 2011. The story is focused on Zeri and his changing relationships with his schoolmates over the course of the events of the game. The first volume was published on January 31, 2011, and the second volume on September 1, 2011.

=== Valkyria Chronicles III ===
- Valkyria Chronicles III

戦場のヴァルキュリア3 (Senjō no Varukyuria 3)
- Genre: Action, drama, comedy, romance, military
Further information
Original video animation
Taga Tame no Jūsō
Directed by	Nobuhiro Kondō
Produced by	Shinji Motoyama
Written by	Hiroshi Ōnogi
Music by	Hitoshi Sakimoto
Studio	A-1 Pictures
Released	June 29, 2011 – August 31, 2011
Episodes	2
Manga
Na mo Naki Chikai no Hana
Written by	Sega
Illustrated by	Naoyuki Fujisawa
Published by	ASCII Media Works
Magazine	Dengeki Maoh
Original run	March 26, 2011 – February 27, 2012
Volumes	2
Manga
Akaki Unmei no Ikusa Otome
Written by	Sega
Illustrated by	Mizuki Tsuge
Published by	Kadokawa Shoten
Magazine	Comp Ace
Original run	July 26, 2011 – January 26, 2012
Volumes	1

==== Anime ====
Valkyria Chronicles III was adapted into a two-episode original video animation series in the same year of its release. Titled Senjō no Varukyuria 3: Taga Tame no Jūsō (戦場のヴァルキュリア3 誰がための銃瘡; lit. Valkyria of the Battlefield 3: The Wound Taken for Someone's Sake), it was originally released through PlayStation Network and Qriocity between April and May 2011. The initially planned release and availability period needed to be extended due to a stoppage to PSN during the early summer of that year. It later released for DVD on June 29 and August 31, 2011, with separate "Black" and "Blue" editions being available for purchase. The anime is set during the latter half of Valkyria Chronicles III, detailing a mission by the Nameless against their Imperial rivals Calamity Raven. The anime was first announced in November 2010. It was developed by A-1 Pictures, produced by Shinji Motoyama, directed by Nobuhiro Kondō, and written by Hiroshi Ōnogi. Sakimoto's music for the game was used in the anime.

The anime's title was inspired by the principal purpose of the Nameless: to suffer in battle for the goals of others. A subtitle attached to the project during development was "The Road to Kubinka", which referenced the Kubinka Tank Museum in Moscow. The game's main theme was how the characters regained their sense of self when stripped of their names and identities, along with general themes focused on war and its consequences. While making the anime, the production team were told by Sega to make it as realistic as possible, with the consequence that the team did extensive research into aspects such as what happened when vehicles like tanks were overturned or damaged. Due to it being along the same timeline as the original game and its anime television adaptation, the cast of Valkyria Chronicles could make appearances, which pleased the team. The opening theme, "Akari (Light) -Tomoshibi-" (灯-TOMOSHIBI-), was sung by Japanese singer Faylan. The ending theme, "Someday the Flowers of Light Will Bloom" (いつか咲く光の花, Itsuka Saku Hikari no Hana), was sung by Minami Kuribayashi. Both songs' lyrics were written by their respective artists.

==== Manga ====
Two manga adaptations were serialized between 2011 and 2012, following each of the game's main female protagonists, Imca and Riela. They were Senjō no Varukyuria 3: Na mo Naki Chikai no Hana (戦場のヴァルキュリア3 名もなき誓いの花; lit. Valkyria of the Battlefield 3: The Flower of the Nameless Oath), illustrated by Naoyuki Fujisawa and released in two volumes by ASCII Media Works after being serialized in Dengeki Maoh from March 26, 2011, to February 27, 2012; and Senjō no Varukyuria 3: -Akaki Unmei no Ikusa Otome- (戦場のヴァルキュリア3 -赤き運命の戦乙女-; lit. Valkyria of the Battlefield 3: The Valkyrie of the Crimson Fate), illustrated by Mizuki Tsuge and released in a single volume by Kadokawa Shoten after being serialized in Comp Ace from July 26, 2011, to January 26, 2012.

== Reception ==
Aggregate review scores
Game	Metacritic
Valkyria Chronicles	(PS3) 86/100 (PC) 85/100 (PS4) 84/100 (NS) 84/100
Valkyria Chronicles II	(PSP) 83/100
Valkyria Chronicles III	—
Valkyria Revolution	(PS4) 54/100 (XONE) 56/100
Valkyria Chronicles 4	(NS) 82/100 (PC) 83/100 (PS4) 85/100 (XONE) 81/100

Valkyria Chronicles series has had a generally positive reception. The original Valkyria Chronicles won numerous awards, including Strategy Game of the Year from GameSpy and is considered one of the greatest games of all time.

By 2015, Valkyria Chronicles sold over 200,000 copies on Steam, exceeding expectations, and shipped over one million on the PlayStation 3. The second game was the second best-selling video game in Japan during its release week, selling 94,000 copies. The third game sold approximately 100,000 units during its premier week, faring better than its predecessors. By 2020 the fourth game sold over one million copies worldwide on all platforms.

== See also ==
- Skies of Arcadia
