= Valkyria Chronicles II =

2010 video game

- North American cover art
- Developer: Sega CS3
- Publisher: Sega
- Director: Takeshi Ozawa
- Producers: Shinji Motoyama; Kei Mikami
- Designer: Kohei Yamashita
- Artist: Hirotaka Kanazawa
- Composer: Hitoshi Sakimoto
- Series: Valkyria Chronicles
- Platform: PlayStation Portable
- Release: JP: January 21, 2010; NA: August 31, 2010; EU: September 3, 2010; AU: September 2, 2010
- Genre: Tactical role-playing game
- Modes: Single-player, multiplayer

Valkyria Chronicles II (Note: Known in Japan as Senjō no Varukyuria 2: Garia Ōritsu Shikan Gakkō (Japanese: 戦場のヴァルキュリア2 ガリア王立士官学校; lit. Valkyria of the Battlefield 2: Gallian Royal Military Academy)) is a tactical role-playing video game developed and published by Sega for the PlayStation Portable. Released in 2010, it is the second game in the Valkyria Chronicles series of games and the sequel to Valkyria Chronicles.

Set two years after the onset of the Second Europan War, the game's story focuses on a military academy as its cadets seek to prevent an ethnic cleansing campaign by a ruthless rebel group. Upon release, Valkyria Chronicles II received mostly high scores from several notable video game publications.

A third game in the series, Valkyria Chronicles III, which is also on the PlayStation Portable, was released on January 27, 2011, in Japan. However, as the game takes place around the same time as the first game, it is a prequel to Valkyria Chronicles II.

== Gameplay ==
Customization screen for playable characters on playable classes

Many gameplay concepts in Valkyria Chronicles II are carried over from the original. The BLiTZ system is used during combat scenarios, splitting the action between an overhead Command Mode and third-person Action Mode. By selecting allied units during Command Mode, using Command Points in the process, said units can move and perform actions until their Action Points run out. When the player has exhausted their available Command Points, or volunteers to pass control without using all of them, the Player Phase ends and the Enemy Phase begins. This progresses back and forth until the battle's victory conditions are achieved or the player is defeated. Valkyria Chronicles II uses a system of multiple area maps connected by enemy encampments. When an enemy camp is captured by the player's forces, subsequent areas are made available, using the camp as a way-point to call in reinforcements and proceed.

Also similar to the original, the characters available for use by the player each occupy a specific class - an exception is the main character Avan who can freely move between classes. Valkyria Chronicles II features new class types and the ability of units to change their class based on a branching tree of upgrades. All five original classes from Valkyria Chronicles reappear, some with slight modification. Scouts, Shocktroopers, Engineers, and Lancers act as the base units that lead to more powerful and specialized promotions. Snipers, rather than being a starting class, are a part of the Scout's upgrade potential. The final base class is new to the series. The Armored Tech class can disarm mines and carry large shields that can deflect rifle and machine gun fire. Armored soldiers do not carry a firearm, instead wielding a hammer to strike enemies. From these five base unit classes, individual units can use experience earned from completing missions to move into more advanced forms. Advantages garnered from upgrading class range from new weapon types to increased effectiveness against tanks to special abilities. The player has access to a tank. The tank has an increased amount of customization potential, being able to increase its firepower and armor, or be stripped down into a simple armored car.

The game's themes include school and war as the students try to juggle their responsibilities as military academy students and as soldiers. Each time a student's story is fully revealed, an optional mission featuring that character is unlocked, and clearing the mission usually replace negative traits that can hinder their progress in battle with positive ones that makes them more reliable.

== Plot ==
The game's story takes place in 1937 E.C, two years following the conclusion of Valkyria Chronicles, in which Squad 7 defeats Maximillian in Gallia and destroys the Marmota, ending the war between Gallia and the Imperial Alliance. In the wake of the revelation of Archduchess Cordelia's Darcsen heritage, a rebel group of dissatisfied aristocrats and like-minded soldiers and citizens calling themselves the Gallian Revolutionary Army led by Count Gilbert Gassenarl, his son Baldren, his daughter Audrey, and an armored figure named Dirk begins the Gallian Civil War to wage an ethnic cleansing campaign against Gallians of Darcsen descent. However, with the intense fight against the Empire having left Gallia's regular army in an exhausted state, there is initially little to stop the insurrection from gaining momentum. Laws preventing the formation of a national militia to fight fellow Gallians force the government to deploy military academy cadets to the front lines in order to combat and defeat the GRA forces.

Among the students sent out on the field is 17-year-old Avan Hardins, a young man who enrolls in Lanseal Military Academy after his older brother Leon was reported dead during a special mission. Avan is assigned to Class G, and he and his classmates are deployed on multiple missions in opposition to the rebels, who deploy artificial Valkyrur such as Dirk to combat them. Eventually, the rebels directly attack Lanseal and steal research data from Lanseal's abandoned old campus. During the battle, Dirk's helmet is knocked off, revealing him to be a corrupted Leon. In the aftermath, Avan confronts Lanseal headmaster Laurence Kluivert and discovers that he has been using Lanseal as a front to conduct unethical experiments on the students, including Leon, to create the artificial Valkyrur in order to protect Gallia. Despairing over the theft of the research data, Kluivert commits suicide. Meanwhile, the rebels seize control of the Gallian capital of Randgriz and arrest and imprison Cordelia. Gilbert declares himself Archduke, but when he declares his intention to join Gallia to the Federation, Baldren murders him and seizes control of the rebel army.

Audrey attacks Anthold Harbour, but is defeated and killed by Class G. Baldren decides to flee to the Federation for the time being and bide his time until he can strike again. At the harbour, Class G fights and mortally wounds Dirk, who reverts to his true personality of Leon and expires in Avan's arms. Class G then stops Baldren's escape by seizing control of his escape craft, the Federation battleship Dandarius. Cornered, Baldren uses the research data he has taken to turn himself into a Valkyria. Class G kills him in a final battle, bringing an end to the civil war. Gallia starts to rebuild itself again. However, Lanseal Academy has to be closed due to the news of experimentation on students. Class G holds a graduation ceremony, and Avan declares that he will see his friends again in the future.

== Development ==
In July 2009, Famitsu released a statement that a Valkyria Chronicles game was to be developed for the PlayStation Portable. On July 17, 2009, the official Valkyria Chronicles II website was launched to the public with the developer's blog and pictures of the game.

In a blog post on the official website, chief producer Shuntaro Tanaka has revealed that the game will keep the BLiTZ system with wireless ad hoc to be implemented. In addition, Tanaka said that the game's development for the PSP was done "to allow a broader spectrum of users to discover and enjoy what makes Valkyria special." with the possibility of the franchise returning to consoles eventually.

Due to the popularity of the PlayStation Portable in Japan, the game was specifically created with a Japanese audience in mind, resulting in a school setting and more fantastical characters compared to the first game.

The staff in the development of the game were pulled from the Valkyria Chronicles staff, mainly chief producer Shuntaro Tanaka, character designer Raita Honjo and composer Hitoshi Sakimoto with Take Ozawa being posted as the game's director with previous work done on Valkyria Chronicles as its main planner. Shinji Motoyama is the game's producer, having done production work with the Sega-made Bleach games, as well as Nightshade and Blood Will Tell. The anime cutscenes were co-produced by A-1 Pictures.

Sega revealed at the 2009 Tokyo Game Show that the popular J-Pop duo Chemistry would perform the game's opening theme, titled "Our Story". It was released as part of their album "Regeneration" on February 24, 2010.

== Release ==
An extensive amount of special material was produced by the Valkyria Chronicles II staff as bonus items for those players who pre-order the game. First is a reel of bonus footage titled "Valkyria Chronicles 1936: Gallian Front Memoirs." Narrated by Cordelia gi Randgriz, the video summarizes the events of the first game, as well as happenings in the time gap between the two. Similarly, "Gallian Journal 1936" presents background information in the form of a news magazine, with such articles as an interview with the game's antagonist. A limited-edition game soundtrack will also be included. Those who pre-order will also have information with which to unlock Selvaria Bles as a playable character within the game.

Further hidden characters were also made available including Welkin and Alicia, Ramal Valt from the anime, and Mintz and Julius from the Valkyria Chronicles: Wish Your Smile manga. However, Welkin, Alicia, and Ramal are available as a DVD bonus from Volume 6's release in Japan while Mintz and Julius are available after using a special password. It was further announced that Isara, Maximillian, Selvaria and Faldio, also from the first game are hidden characters as well. In addition, by either a special password or linking the game with Phantasy Star Portable 2 save data, Emilia Percival can be unlocked as a playable character, though she doesn't wear the same outfit as she does in that game. This also unlocks other content (including stickers and missions inspired by the game). Unlike its predecessor, the ability to play with Japanese voice-overs was removed in the US and EU releases.

A playable demo of the game was made available on the Japanese PlayStation Store on November 2, 2009, with an online download of the same demo following on November 5. The demo was translated and released in the US PlayStation Store on August 10, 2010.

== Reception ==
Reception

Aggregate score
Aggregator	Score
Metacritic	83/100

Review scores
Publication	Score
Famitsu	35/40
Game Informer	8.5/10
GameTrailers	8.4/10
IGN	9/10
PlayStation: The Official Magazine	9/10
RPGFan	8.6/10

Valkyria Chronicles II received a positive critical reception. The game was given a total score of 35 out of 40 and a "Platinum Award" from a panel of four reviewers in the Japanese Famitsu magazine. It was the second best-selling video game in Japan during its release week at 94,000 copies sold.

IGN praised the game for its replay value in particular and listed it as the seventh best PSP game of all time. GameSpot called it 'a worthy sequel' and awarded it three emblems: 'Get More Than Your Money's Worth', 'Great Sequel' and 'Outstanding Gameplay'. Destructoid gave it a near-perfect score of 9.5, one of the highest scores on the site, and the second highest-rated PSP game after Persona 3 Portable. During the 14th Annual Interactive Achievement Awards, the Academy of Interactive Arts & Sciences nominated Valkyria Chronicles II for "Portable Game of the Year", but ultimately awarded to God of War: Ghost of Sparta.

== Adaptations ==
Three manga adaptations were released by Sega in Japan.
