= Raita Honjou =

Japanese doujin artist and illustrator

- 本庄雷太
- Born: September 17, 1972 (age 53)
- Occupations: Doujin artist; Illustrator; Character designer
- Known for: Valkyria Chronicles
- Website: raitab.blog.2nt.com

Raita Honjou (本庄雷太, Honjou Raita) is a Japanese doujin artist, illustrator, and character designer.

== Art and career ==
Raita has been the lead character designer for SEGA's Valkyria Chronicles video game series since the series premier in 2008. Udon Entertainment has released three artbooks that featured Raita's illustrations from the series. In 2022, the Phrase Gallery in Akihabara hosted a solo exhibition of Raita's artworks, including artworks related to the Valkyria Chronicles series. The exhibition featured about 50 artworks in total.

The 2012 visual novel Katawa Shoujo was inspired by a one-page concept illustration by Raita that was published by the dōjin circle Zettai Shoujo. The game was developed by a group of 4chan users with Raita's blessing. Raita said that he loved the game after it was shown to him at Comiket, and following the game's release, Raita thanked the developers on his blog.

In 2012, Raita released a drama CD and an original anime Blu-ray called Magical Girl at Comiket 82. The CD and Blu-ray featured voices actresses Mamiko Noto, Rie Tanaka, Ayako Kawasumi, and Ai Kayano.

Raita has designed several characters for the popular mobile game Fate/Grand Order, including Shuten Dōji, Minamoto no Raikō, and Sakata Kintoki.

== Exhibitions ==
- 2022: Raita Honjou & Valkyria Chronicles Exhibition, Phrase Gallery Akihabara, Akihabara, Japan
- 2024: Fate/Grand Order Part 1, Phrase Gallery Akihabara, Akihabara, Japan
