= Maria (band) =

Japanese band

- Origin: Japan
- Genres: J-pop, pop rock, power pop
- Years active: 2005–2010
- Label: Sony Music Japan
- Past members: Maiko Sakae; Aika; Reina; Tattsu; Ayuka; Sacchin; Hazel
- Website: maria-6.com

Maria (stylized as MARIA) was an all female Japanese pop rock band signed onto Sony Music Japan. The band consists of six members. They released their first single on March 8, 2006, titled "Chiisa na Uta". This song is used as the 3rd opening song of the anime Yakitate!! Japan. Also, their single Tsubomi is used as the theme song of Naruto the Movie 3: Guardians of the Crescent Moon Kingdom, and their single Heartbeat was used as an opening theme song of the anime Deltora Quest.

In 2006 came out their first album, entitled "You Go!: We Are Maria", but their popularity really came to raise after "Tsubomi" single release. In 2008, though, Maria came out with their first DVD, featuring a live tour for the first album, and was entitled "Maria Live Tour - We Are Maria 2007", which reached the height of 30th place in Oricon parade.

Maria disbanded in 2010 due to Tattsu's thoracic outlet syndrome, which made it impossible for her to continue playing. Rather than continue with a replacement, they let their contract with Sony lapse.

== Members ==
The band has been having the same formation since its beginning; it is composed by three vocals, two basses, two guitars, a drum, an electric keyboard, and a violin.

- Maiko - Lead Vocals, Bass
- Aika - Vocals, Bass
- Ayuka - Electric Guitar
- Sacchin - Electric Guitar, Leader
- Reina - Keyboards, Electric Violin
- Tattsu - Drums, Back-up Vocals

== DVD ==
Maria Live Tour - We Are Maria 2007: You Go!!~ (March 26, 2008) - 30th place in Oricon

1. Natsu Egao (夏えがお)
2. Chiisana Shi (小さな詩)
3. h@ccha ke (h@ッちゃけ)
4. Heartbeat (Heart☆beat)
5. Kirari Natsu (キラリ夏)
6. Watch Me
7. Tsubomi (つぼみ)
8. Anata ni... (あなたに...)
9. Mabudachi
10. High×2 Furaingu (high×2 フライング☆)
11. Jump
12. Hey! Bun! (Hey＊02♪ ブン＊02♪)
13. Ichiban Hoshi (いちばん星)
14. Arigatou no Kotoba Kara (ありがとうの言葉から)

== Discography ==
Album title	Date Released
You Go!: We Are Maria	June 20, 2007
Day by Day	September 30, 2009

Single	Date Released	Note
Chiisana Uta	March 8, 2006	Used as the third opening song of the anime "Yakitate!! Japan"
Tsubomi	July 26, 2006	Used as the theme song of "Naruto the Movie 3: Guardians of the Crescent Moon Kingdom"
Heartbeat	February 21, 2007	Used as the opening song of the anime Deltora Quest
Yurari Sakurairo	February 6, 2008	Fourth single
Kanashimi Rensa	August 12, 2009	Used as the second opening of the anime "Valkyria Chronicles"
