= Hitoshi Sakimoto =

Japanese composer (born 1969)

- 崎元 仁
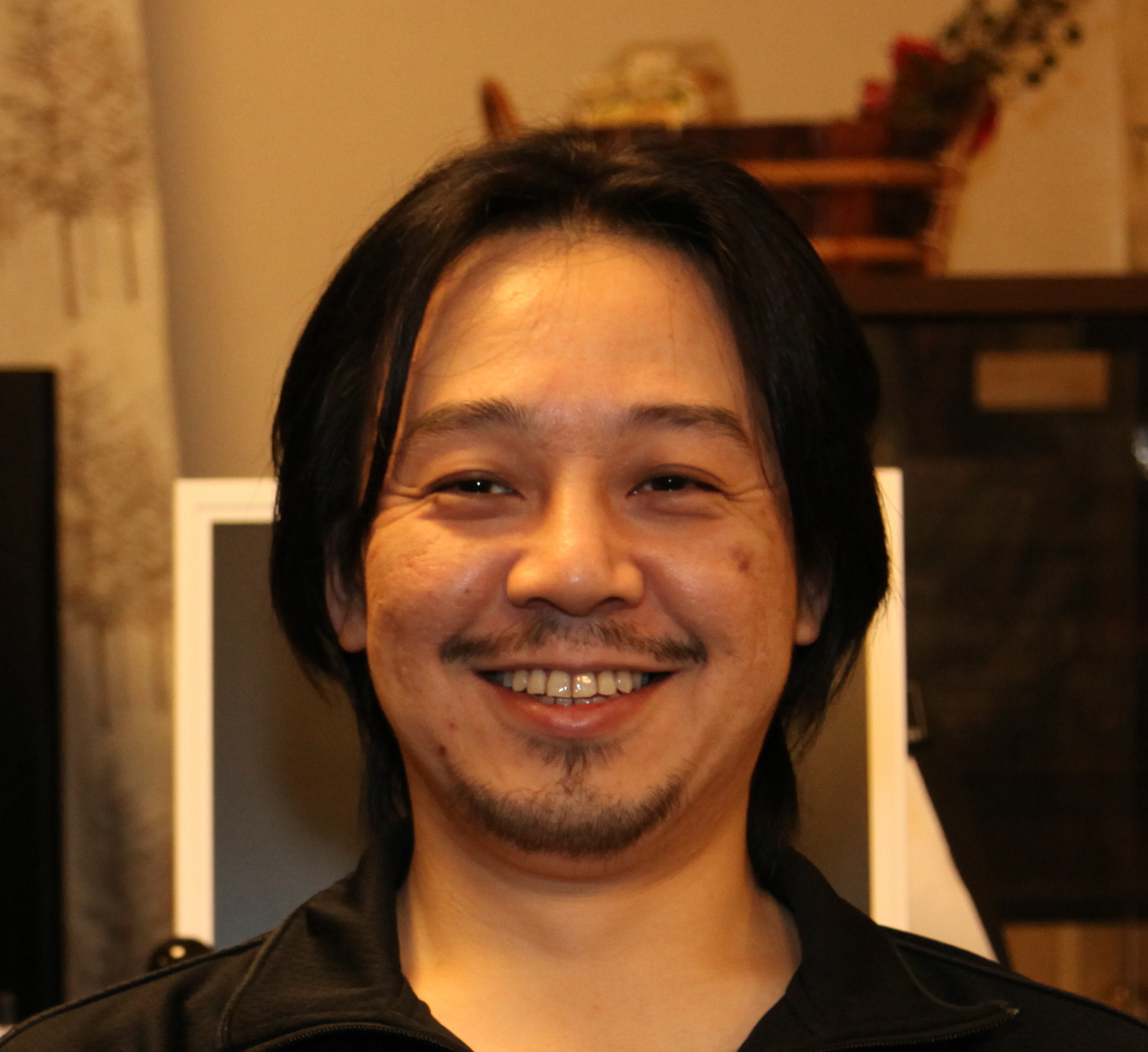
- Sakimoto in 2010
- Born: February 26, 1969 (age 57); Tokyo, Japan
- Other name: YmoH.S
- Occupations: Composer; sound producer
- Years active: 1988–present
- Organization: Basiscape
- Musical career
- Genres: Symphonic; electronica
- Instruments: Piano; electronic organ; synthesizer
- Labels: Basiscape; Scarlet Moon

Hitoshi Sakimoto (崎元 仁, Sakimoto Hitoshi; born February 26, 1969) is a Japanese composer and sound producer. He is best known for scoring the video games Final Fantasy Tactics and Final Fantasy XII, though he has composed soundtracks for numerous other games. Sakimoto first played music and video games in elementary school and began composing music professionally in 1988. He worked at the video game company Square from 1998 to 2000, before founding the music and sound production company Basiscape in 2002.

== Biography ==
=== Early life ===
Sakimoto was born on February 26, 1969, in Tokyo, Japan. He began developing an interest in music beginning in elementary school, when he taught himself to play the piano and electronic organ and participated in some brass and rock bands. A fan of video games, he began creating his own games in junior high school with some friends. While in his senior high school years, Sakimoto wrote for the computer magazine Oh!FM and compiled data about pieces of music he liked, becoming a self-professed "computer, games, and music geek".

Sakimoto started composing for games when he was 16, and was paid to both create the music and the program to play it for several games. Composing for these games was the first time he had ever composed music for any instrument. His debut as a professional gaming composer came in 1988, when he and his friend Masaharu Iwata, whom he has worked with on numerous later titles, scored the shooter game Revolter, published by ASCGroup for the NEC PC-8801. Sakimoto also created the synthesizer driver "Terpsichorean" to enhance the sound quality of the game's music; the synthesizer driver has been implemented into many games throughout the Japanese game market in the early 1990s. Despite Revolter's success, he continued with his previous goal to become a video game programmer rather than a composer; however, his friends and colleagues encouraged him to continue composing game music. The recognition he gained within the gaming industry jump-started his career.

=== Career ===
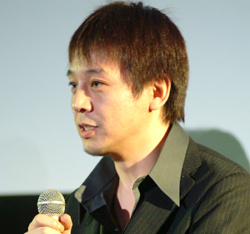
Sakimoto in 2004

After Revolter, Sakimoto's music and synthesizer driver earned him immediate recognition in the industry, resulting in him being asked to score several PC-9801 and Mega Drive games such as Starship Rendezvous and Gauntlet IV, as well as use his driver both in the scores he wrote and for other games. Between 1990 and 1992, Sakimoto worked on over 20 different video games for several different companies such as Toshiba EMI, Artec, and Data East. It was during this time that he composed his first solo score in 1990 for Bubble Ghost.

Sakimoto's first encounter with mainstream success in Japan came about in 1993 when he composed Ogre Battle: March of the Black Queen. The game was directed by Yasumi Matsuno, and since the release of the title, he has chosen Sakimoto as a regular for his development team at Quest and later Square. Sakimoto also worked on 14 other titles that year, including Shin Megami Tensei and Alien vs. Predator. Over the next few years, he would go on to compose for or work on over 40 more titles such as Tactics Ogre. In 1997, Sakimoto composed the score for Final Fantasy Tactics, which made him internationally famous, and was the score he was best known for outside Japan until at least 2006. This led to him joining Square as an employee, where he worked on Vagrant Story, his only score as an employee of Square. After leaving in 2000 he became freelance and went on to compose Breath of Fire V and Tactics Ogre: The Knight of Lodis for Capcom and Quest respectively. After a couple of years of planning he formed his own music production company, Basiscape, in October 2002.

=== Basiscape ===
Basiscape is a music and sound production studio founded by Sakimoto in 2002. The company has contributed to video games, anime, and films. Sakimoto says that he left Square to found the company because he wanted more freedom in choosing his projects. At its founding, it had only three members: Sakimoto, Iwata, and Manabu Namiki. Through Basiscape, Sakimoto continued to compose for several different companies, including Square Enix. The company expanded in the mid-2000s with the addition of Mitsuhiro Kaneda, Kimihiro Abe, Noriyuki Kamikura, Yoshimi Kudo, and Azusa Chiba. Members of the company are free to procure personal work as well as collaborate with other members on projects. The company launched a record label in 2009.

=== Other projects ===
Sakimoto has also been involved in non-gaming projects during his career. He contributed one track each to the albums Ten Plants (1998) and 2197 (1999), which feature music from various well-known artists. Sakimoto collaborated with singer Lia in 2005 to create the music for the album Colors of Life. He composed the music for two anime series; Romeo x Juliet (2007) and The Tower of Druaga: The Aegis of Uruk (2008); as well as the original video animation (OVA) Legend of Phoenix ~Layla Hamilton Monogatari~ in 2005.

== Performances ==
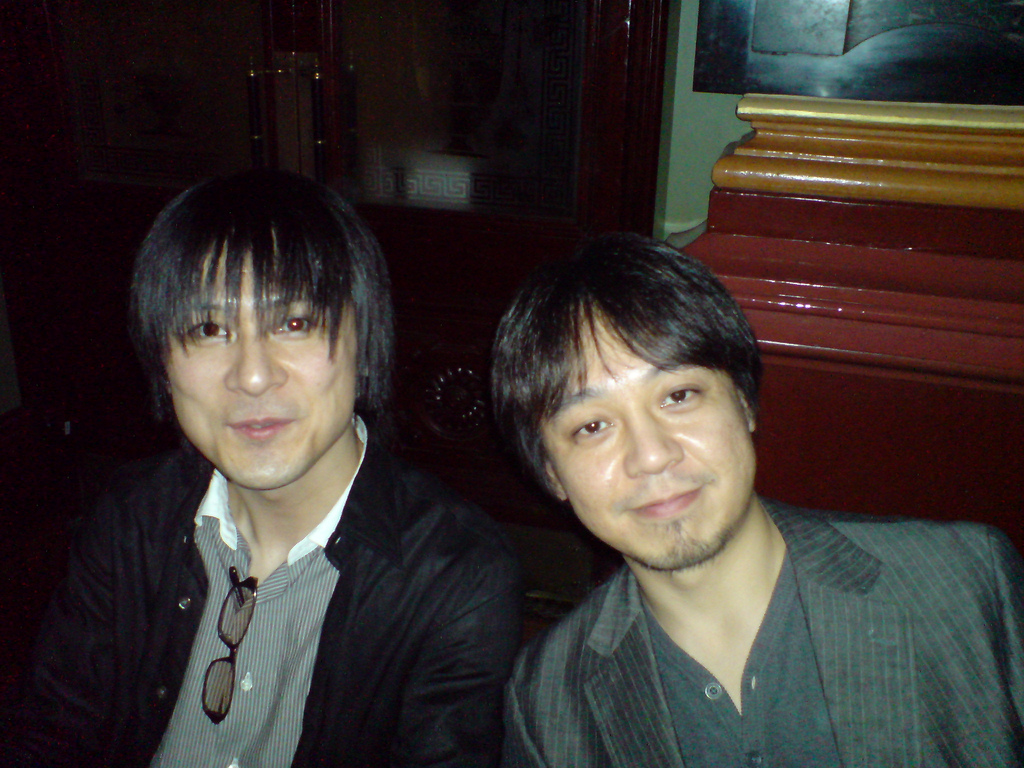
Yasunori Mitsuda and Sakimoto in 2007

Sakimoto has made numerous appearances at video game concerts that have performed his compositions. He, along with Yoko Shimomura and Michael Salvatori, were special guests at a July 2006 Play! A Video Game Symphony event at the Orchestra Hall in Detroit. He has developed a strong relationship with the Australian-based Eminence Symphony Orchestra. Sakimoto and Yasunori Mitsuda made guest appearances at their Passion event in December 2006. In April 2007, he appeared at Eminence's A Night in Fantasia 2007: Symphonic Games Edition, which featured three of his compositions. Sakimoto and Mitsuda collaborated with Eminence in July the same year to create Destiny: Reunion, a concert held exclusively in Japan. Eminence released Passion (2006) and Destiny: Dreamer's Alliance (2007), two studio recorded albums that feature various compositions from the Passion and Destiny: Reunion concerts respectively. "Penelo's Theme" from Final Fantasy XII and a medley of pieces from Final Fantasy Tactics A2 were played at the Fantasy Comes Alive concert in Singapore in April 2010.

== Musical style and influences ==
Sakimoto composes his music by playing the pieces "briefly on the piano", and then working on a computer for more detailed arrangements. The style of Sakimoto's compositions is mostly orchestral; he creates the orchestral sound by playing the music through a sequencer instead of using a real orchestra due to the high cost. When composing a soundtrack for a video game, Sakimoto first sits down with the director or producer of the game and works out what emotions they want the game to evoke in the player, and after making a demo for them, sets out to create music that fits that feeling. He claims that his style of composition does not change when he works on non-game works such as anime series, saying that only the tone of the pieces is different. He attributes any changes in his style over the years to his desire to constantly keep growing and learning new styles and techniques, saying that if you have not moved forward in your skill and style over time, "you've wasted your time".

He has stated that his biggest musical influences are "old techno and progressive rock" groups such as the Japanese synthpop group Yellow Magic Orchestra. When he was starting out in the field of music, he went under the pseudonym "YmoH.S", a reference to Yellow Magic Orchestra. He also cites the American jazz musician Chick Corea as a major influence. While creating the music for Final Fantasy XII, however, his biggest musical inspiration was former regular series composer Nobuo Uematsu. Sakimoto enjoys listening to techno and jazz fusion in his spare time. While he sometimes gets inspiration while relaxing at home, Sakimoto feels that his best ideas come to him while he is at his studio concentrating. He cited Vagrant Story as one of his favorite soundtracks.

== Notable works ==
=== Video games ===
Video game works
Year	Title	Role(s)	Ref.
1991	Devilish	Music	
1991	Verytex	Music with Masaharu Iwata and Yoshio Furukawa	
1991	Magical Chase	Music with Masaharu Iwata	
1993	Gauntlet IV	Music with Masaharu Iwata	
1993	Ogre Battle	Music with Masaharu Iwata and Hayato Matsuo	
1994	X-Kaliber 2097	Music with Hayato Matsuo	
1994	Kingdom Grand Prix	Music with Masaharu Iwata	
1995	Tactics Ogre	Music with Masaharu Iwata and Hayato Matsuo	
1996	Treasure Hunter G	Music with several others	
1996	Terra Diver	Music	
1997	Bloody Roar	Music with several others	
1997	Final Fantasy Tactics	Music with Masaharu Iwata	
1998	Radiant Silvergun	Music	
1998	Armed Police Batrider	Music with Kenichi Koyano and Manabu Namiki	
1999	Ogre Battle 64	Music with Masaharu Iwata and Hayato Matsuo	
2000	Vagrant Story	Music	
2001	Tactics Ogre: The Knight of Lodis	Music with Masaharu Iwata	
2001	Legaia 2: Duel Saga	Music with Yasunori Mitsuda and Michiru Oshima	
2001	Tekken Advance	Music with Atsuhiro Motoyama	
2002	Breath of Fire: Dragon Quarter	Music	
2003	Final Fantasy Tactics Advance	Music with Ayako Saso, Kaori Ohkoshi, and Nobuo Uematsu	
2004	Gradius V	Music	
2004	Stella Deus: The Gate of Eternity	Music with Masaharu Iwata	
2006	Monster Kingdom: Jewel Summoner	Music with several others	
2006	Fantasy Earth Zero	Music with Masaharu Iwata, Manabu Namiki, and Kenichi Koyano	
2006	Final Fantasy XII	Music	
2006	Battle Stadium D.O.N	Music with Basiscape	
2006	Digimon World Data Squad	Music with Basiscape	
2007	GrimGrimoire	Music with Basiscape	
2007	Final Fantasy XII: Revenant Wings	Music with Kenichiro Fukui	
2007	Final Fantasy Tactics: The War of the Lions	Music with Masaharu Iwata	
2007	Odin Sphere	Music with Basiscape	
2007	ASH: Archaic Sealed Heat	Music with Masaharu Iwata	
2007	Final Fantasy Tactics A2: Grimoire of the Rift	Music with Ayako Saso, Kaori Ohkoshi, and Mitsuhiro Kaneda	
2007	Opoona	Music with Basiscape	
2007	Deltora Quest: The Seven Gems	Music with Basiscape	
2008	Valkyria Chronicles	Music	
2008	The Wizard of Oz: Beyond the Yellow Brick Road	Music with Kimihiro Abe, Masaharu Iwata, and Michiko Naruke	
2008	Coded Soul	Music with Basiscape	
2009	Muramasa: The Demon Blade	Music with Basiscape	
2009	Tekken 6	Music with Basiscape and others	
2009	Lord of Vermilion II	Music	
2010	Valkyria Chronicles II	Music	
2010	Tactics Ogre: Let Us Cling Together	Remake; music with Masaharu Iwata and Hayato Matsuo	
2011	Valkyria Chronicles III	Music	
2012	Crimson Shroud	Music with Basiscape	
2013	Dragon's Crown	Music	
2014	Terra Battle	Music with several others	
2015	Zodiac: Orcanon Odyssey	Music	
2016	Odin Sphere Leifthrasir	Music with Basiscape	
2017	Final Fantasy XII: The Zodiac Age	Music	
2018	Valkyria Chronicles 4	Music	
2019	13 Sentinels: Aegis Rim	Music with Basiscape	
2020	Unsung Story	Music; early access release	
2021	Astria Ascending	Music with Basiscape	
2022	Little Noah: Scion of Paradise	Music	
2022	Tactics Ogre: Reborn	Music with Basiscape	
2024	Sword of Convallaria	Music	
2024	Wizardry Variants Daphne	Music	
2024	Songs of Silence	Music	
2025	Towa and the Guardians of the Sacred Tree	Music	
2026	Veritas Tales: Witch of the Dark Castle	Music	
2026	Lost Hellden	Music	
2027	Eternal Anima	Music with Basiscape	

=== Other ===
Year	Title	Role(s)	Ref.
2005	Kaleido Star: Legend of Phoenix - Layla Hamilton Story	Ending theme	
2007	Romeo x Juliet	Music	
2008	The Tower of Druaga: The Aegis of Uruk	Music	
2009	The Tower of Druaga: The Sword of Uruk	Music	
2011	Tekken: Blood Vengeance	Music with Basiscape	
2015	Chaos Dragon	Music	
