= Valkyria Revolution =

2017 video game

- North American cover art
- Developers: Sega CS3; Media.Vision
- Publisher: Sega: EU: Deep Silver
- Director: Takeshi Ozawa
- Producers: Youichi Shimosato; Kei Mikami
- Artists: Hiro Kiyohara; Takayama Toshiaki
- Composer: Yasunori Mitsuda
- Series: Valkyria Chronicles
- Platforms: PlayStation 4, PlayStation Vita, Xbox One
- Release: JP: January 19, 2017; NA: June 27, 2017; EU: June 30, 2017
- Genre: Action role-playing
- Mode: Single-player

Valkyria Revolution (Note: Known in Japan as Aoki Kakumei no Varukyuria (Japanese: 蒼き革命のヴァルキュリア; lit. Valkyria of the Blue Revolution)) is a 2017 action role-playing video game developed by Media.Vision and published by Sega for the PlayStation 4, PlayStation Vita and Xbox One. It is a spin-off of the Valkyria Chronicles series, set in a different fictional universe. The game received mixed reviews from critics, who praised the game's setting and concept as engaging but criticized the story delivery and large amount of loading screens, calling the gameplay and graphical quality lackluster.

== Gameplay ==
Combat sequence in the game.

Valkyria Revolution is an action role-playing game with strategy elements. The flow of the game consists of the player preparing at their base, going to the battlefield to achieve their objectives, and then returning to the base again. The game includes the possibility of permanent death for the characters, but players are able to retry if one of them dies.

The turn-based action found in the Valkyria Chronicles series was replaced with a more active combat system where actions and decisions on the battlefield have to be made in real time. The player leads a squad of up to 4 allies with different roles including damage-dealing shocktroopers, fleet-footed scouts, shield-bearers with heavy defense, and "sappers" who focus on alchemy and long-range attacks. Though the player can only control one character at a time, the artificial intelligence behavior of their allies can be influenced by chosen "Priorities" that can be set before battle. Priorities range from basic commands like using melee attacks, to more specific commands like guarding allies at low health. More Priorities can be acquired by visiting a "Circle" in town between missions and listening to their conversation. Furthermore, players can order their squad to focus on offense, defense, or support functions, and can break up their squad into "solo" or "partner" units to take on multiple enemies, or stay as a squad to focus on one enemy.

Each character carries a melee weapon, long-range weapon, a grenade, and an item pouch for single-use restorative items. The long-range weapon and grenades have limited ammo, which can only be replenished by capturing enemy bases in the field. Each character also has the ability to cast magic spells called "alchemy," with varying affects depending on the type of alchemy equipped. Most weapons and alchemy can be upgraded and switched out among every character between battles at Basil's Workshop in town, but melee weapons are permanently attached to the specific characters wielding them. Melee weapons can be upgraded at Basil's shop to expand the user's stats and alchemic affinities, but extra alchemy must be used to upgrade them instead of money.

== Plot ==
The story of Valkyria Revolution is told in medias res as a Jutland student working on a paper about "The Five Traitors" seeks to learn more about their history and the war between Jutland and the Ruzi Empire. His teacher, Richelle, frequently interrupts the game to elaborate on certain points within the story as told to her by her great-great-grandmother, who was a teacher to the Jutish princess at the time.

The small country of Jutland was economically blockaded by Ruzhien, a powerful empire that expanded its territory and achieved rapid industrial development after discovering the azure mineral Ragnite, which serves both as an energy source and a catalyst for alchemic development. Ten years prior to the war, in the land of Molda, an orphanage was burned down by the Ruzi Emperor Klaudiusz and his four Grand Generals as they were visiting nearby Valkyria ruins. The men also kidnapped Maria, the caretaker at the orphanage. Only five orphans survived, having been away from the orphanage at the time: Amleth Grønkjær, Basil Sabancci, Fritte Eriksen, Solomon Kahlenberg and Violette Szand. The five secretly plotted to kill Klaudiusz and attempt to find Maria.

As they were adopted by foster parents, the five grew incredibly skilled in their respective fields: Amleth became an officer in the Jutland army, and would later form then anti-Valkyrie unit named Vanargand. Basil became an industrialist who owned a factory that dealt in ragnite-based weapons and technology. Fritte chose to become a writer, using his words to inspire the people of Jutland and later provoke them into war. Solomon became a legislator who helped provide legal cover for the group's actions while steering the country towards war. Violette became a master spy, using her skills and charm to form a large network of contacts throughout Europa.

An initial attempt to kill Klaudiusz failed, as Amleth's strike was blocked by the appearance of a Reaper-like figure and nearly killed, but for some reason the Reaper spared his life and fled. Following the event, the five discussed their next move, as Klaudiusz would no longer be so vulnerable while the Ruzi Empire and its allies blockaded Jutland to the breaking point. After a coin toss, the five decided to set Jutland on a course for war, both to end the blockade and to get revenge for Maria. With Basil's help, Amleth formed Vanargand within the Jutish army, knowing that any attack on Klaudiusz would be pointless if they could not defeat the Valkyria-esque Reaper guarding him.

Joining Amleth and his newly-formed unit were the Jutish Princess Ophelia and her protective knight, Godot. Despite Amleth's objections, Ophelia decides to join Vanargand on the front lines in Molda and gets her first taste of battle by stabbing a Ruzi soldier with her rapier. Amleth chased down the fleeing Grand General, Balthus Greppenberg, after the unit destroyed his Dragon mech. When the General refused to answer any more questions about Maria, Amleth killed him while Ophelia and Godot watched nearby. Though the country rejoiced at an easing of the blockade, Ophelia and Godot began digging into Amleth's background, while the Five continued provoking the country further into war against the Empire.

The next battlefront was the kingdom of Ipseria, where Amleth, Ophelia and Godot ran into a powerful attacker with a magically-enhanced prosthetic arm bearing a resemblance to Maxim Laertes, the estranged Prince of Ipseria. However, Maxim escaped before they could find out why he allied himself with the Empire. The Jutish Army continued marching north to "liberate" more countries from the Empire, while Amleth hoped to find a second Grand General, Gustav Mecklenburg. While the army secured an industrial town, Amleth found Gustav nearby, but the Jutish contingent in the city collapsed after the appearance of the Reaper from before, singing a mysterious song. Ophelia was surprised to find that she was unaffected, and that her own song could cancel out the Reaper's magic. Even with their combined efforts, the Vanargand unit just barely fought off the Reaper, but ended up ripping off her outfit to reveal a Valkyria woman wearing a pendant that bore a strong resemblance to Maria.

Though Jutland claimed victory in the battle, Amleth's behavior led to increased suspicion both from Godot and others within Vanargand. In-between missions, Godot tracked down the Five Traitors but decided to keep their identities secret, thinking that their actions supported Jutland, regardless of their motives. Several battles later, Vanargand assisted the Jutland Army with a push at Kovaltis, only to find themselves facing the Valkyria again. After another drawn out battle, Amleth stayed his hand, hearing Maria's voice from the Valkyria. Just as the Valkyria was about to strike Amleth, Godot threw himself in front of her scythe, sacrificing his life. Back home, Godot's younger sister Miranda picked up his sword and shield and took his role as Vanargand's Executive Officer, but she later found a journal among Godot's belongings that led her to the identities of the Five Traitors. It's later revealed that the empire kidnapped Miss Maria to become the vessel for the Valkyria Brunhilde.

Later, the rest of the squad finds out about Amleth's true motivations and the rest of the Traitors and they initially distrust him, but thanks to Ophelia, The Traitors and Anti-Valkyria squad work together to defeat the rest of the Ruzhien empire. Amleth also overcomes his doubts and finally kills Brunhilde and at the same time, Miss Maria peacefully dies in his arms. Klaudiusz commits suicide before the squad can reach him and the Empire collapses with his death. Afterwards, the Traitors take responsibility for the war and all five are sentenced to death. However, a secret ending implies that the squad helps the traitors escape.

== Development ==
The game was developed by Media.Vision, and is directed by Takeshi Ozawa and produced by Youichi Shimosato and Kei Mikami. The characters are designed by Hiro Kiyohara and Takayama Toshiaki, and modeled by Flight Unit. The game uses the Gouache Drawing Engine for the graphics, with which the development team intends to depict the game in a painting-like manner. Work on the game began with the development team wanting to create something new related to the Valkyria series; at first, they considered making a real-time strategy game, but decided to make a real-time role-playing game instead, as they thought more people would want to play that. Ozawa said that while there are aspects of the game that are similar to Valkyria Chronicles, the game is mostly different. Shimosato saw it as a new series within the Valkyria franchise; he referred to it as the Kakumei ("Revolution") series, and called previous Valkyria games the Senjou ("Battlefield") series.

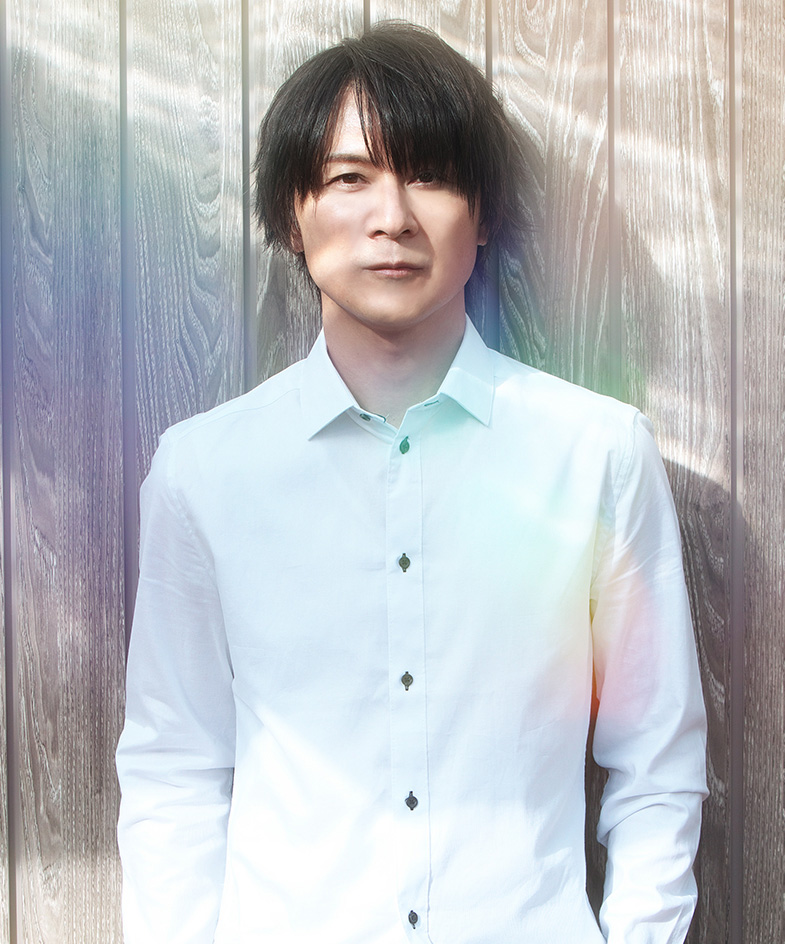
Yasunori Mitsuda composed and produced the game's soundtrack

The game's original score was composed, arranged, and produced by Yasunori Mitsuda, which was his first solo game soundtrack in over seven years. Intending to express the game's worldview through the music, he chose to use a classical sound for the game, and used seamless switching between battle and field music, something that was new to him. The main theme was performed by the Tokyo Symphony Orchestra; according to Mitsuda, the scale of the recording session was larger than what was usual for Japanese video games. A few songs were sung by Sarah Àlainn, who Mitsuda had also worked with previously on the ending track of Xenoblade Chronicles. According to her and Mitsuda, it was a positive song themed around death. Because of its similarity to hymns, Àlainn attempted to express the song with a "mystic yet dark feeling to the singing".

One of the game's themes is death; the development team felt that if characters would not die, the player would not feel fear, which is what led to the inclusion of permanent death in the game. They included story events for specific characters, to make the player feel motivated to keep everyone alive; while the main story continues, events relating to specific characters do not occur if that character is dead. However, they intended for it to be possible to experience everything in the game if the player puts effort into it, with it being possible to retry if a character dies. The development team did not want to tone down the obstacles the player faces in the game; instead, they plan to include an easier mode.

A demo for the game was included with the PlayStation 4 release of Valkyria Chronicles; Sega gathered feedback on the game from people who play the demo. This was a change compared to previous games by the developer, where the demo was released close to the release of the final product, making it have no effect on the development. They received around three times the amount of feedback they had expected; according to Kozawa, a lot of it was "harsh". This led them to change the game's battle system, to make it feel more like a role-playing game and less like an action game: in the demo, the action focus made it difficult to strategize during battles, so the developers added an action gauge to allied and enemy characters, with actions being possible to perform when the gauge is filled up; they also added the option for players to stop time while using weapons or abilities. Among other changes in response to the feedback were an increased number of party members and the removal of field encounters. Kozawa also said that he was thinking of a way for the player to customize the artificial intelligence of their allies, and that they were working on a way to make direct commands.

== Promotion and release ==
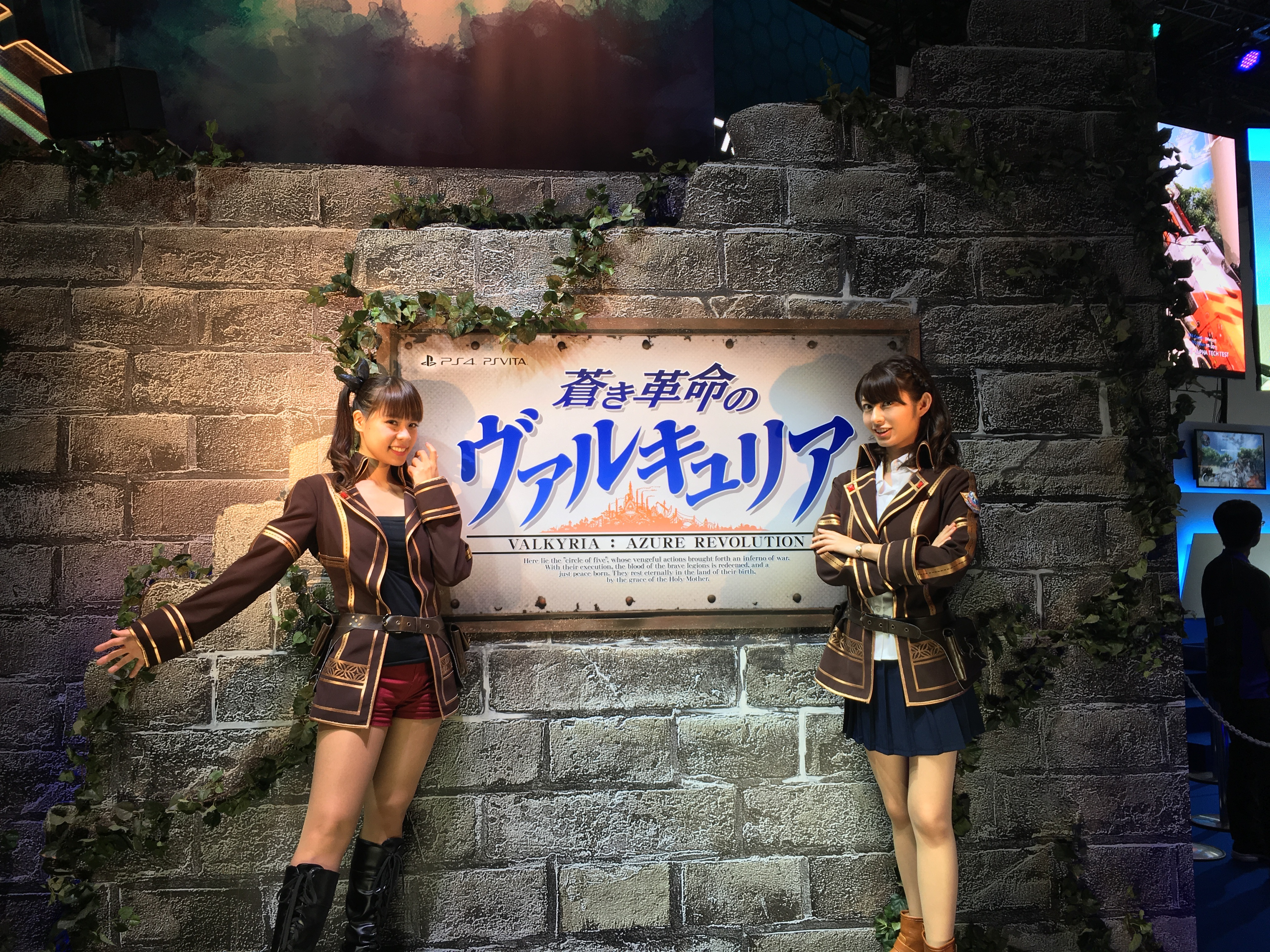
Valkyria Revolution booth at Tokyo Game Show 2016

The game was announced for PlayStation 4 in November 2015 alongside a PlayStation 4 version of Valkyria Chronicles. In August 2016, a PlayStation Vita version was also revealed. The game was released in Japan on January 19, 2017, and in North America and Europe in June 2017. For the Western releases, an Xbox One version was also released. The home console versions were made available both physically and digitally in the West, while the PlayStation Vita version was a digital-only title. A two-disc, official soundtrack was released alongside the game's Japanese release on January 19.

In the Americas, pre-orders and limited launch copies of the physical PlayStation 4 and Xbox One versions came packaged as the “Vanargand Edition,” named after the in-game specialized unit of anti-Valkyria soldiers. It includes a metal pin emblazoned with the elite team’s insignia, a 12-track soundtrack by Mitsuda, and a special outer box.

According to Sega, the reason they changed the title from the Japanese original was that a direct translation of Aoki Kakumei no Varukyuria ("Valkyria of the Blue Revolution") seemed "unwieldy" and difficult to handle graphically, while the punctuation in Valkyria: Azure Revolution also was a hindrance. Because of this, they decided to use a two-word title, similar to Valkyria Chronicles, but different enough that the two games would stand "equal but apart from each other".

Four downloadable content (DLC) packs were released for free following the game's launch, adding new items and scenarios.

== Reception ==
Reception

Aggregate score
Aggregator	Score
Metacritic	PS4: 54/100; XONE: 56/100

Review scores
Publication	Score
Destructoid	5/10
Eurogamer	Avoid
Game Informer	6/10
GameRevolution	3/5
GameSpot	6/10
IGN	6/10
Polygon	4.5/10

Valkyria Revolution received "mixed or average" reviews, according to review aggregator Metacritic.

Chris Carter of Destructoid rated the game 5/10, criticizing the high amount of cutscenes and "shoved in" strategic elements as damaging the game's sense of action in its battles, and said it would have "turned out better" if the team "stuck to their guns and made it a full action romp". Janine Hawkins of Polygon rated the game 4.5/10 and said that "a lot of what made its predecessors so endearing is absent", and the game lacked "character interaction and meaningful storytelling". Calling the gameplay "repetitive", she stated that the strategic aspects "just get in the way" of the action, while the combat "feels terrible". While calling the presentation of story segments "gorgeous", she stated that they interrupted the game too often, and that the framing and animation of the cutscenes was "subpar", with the story being "shallow".
