= Akihiko Yoshida =

Japanese video game artist (born 1967)

- 吉田 明彦
- Born: February 15, 1967 (age 59)
- Occupation: Video game artist
- Employer: CyDesignation
- Notable work: Ogre Battle series; Final Fantasy series; Bravely Default; Nier: Automata

Akihiko Yoshida (吉田 明彦, Yoshida Akihiko; born 15 February 1967) is a Japanese video game artist. Yoshida was born in 1967 and joined Square in 1995, before the company merged with Enix. He then left Square Enix in September 2013 and became freelance. In October 2014, he became the company director of CyDesignation, a subsidiary of Cygames. He is well known for his work on the Final Fantasy series. He is a frequent collaborator of game designer Yasumi Matsuno.

== Biography ==
In 1995, Yoshida joined Square and with each project he took on, he experimented with different styles of graphic design. He has compared his use of color to that of Kingdom Hearts character designer Tetsuya Nomura, and the keeping of color consistent between the characters and the game world.

For the game Tactics Ogre, pencil etchings and CG coloration were used together for the first time. Yoshida considers the tone and style of the game to be the "ideal" art style and thus within his comfort zone. The original tarot card illustrations for the game were done for dot graphics, and reflected a limited color index. When remade for the PlayStation Portable, some staff wanted to use the original illustrations, but Yoshida requested to redraw the illustrations with more detail and color than was possible or required previously.

In designing the character of Vaan for Final Fantasy XII, initially the character was "rugged" and "tough", but after considering the demographics of the games audience, the character was made younger and thinner. Once the actors motion captured and voice actor Kohei Takeda did the part, the character became slightly less effeminate than was originally designed. Yoshida set out to create a cast of characters who looked unlike any previous Final Fantasy cast. He also stated that the character reflected what Japanese audiences want, but that they try to design characters everyone likes.

In addition to his work in video games, Yoshida designed the original characters for the 2018 directorial debut film of screenwriter Mari Okada entitled Maquia: When the Promised Flower Blooms.

== Reception ==
He has been cited as a "fantastic" artist by Kotaku, and his work on Vagrant Story and Final Fantasy XII was called "brilliant" and "refined" by IGN.

== Works ==
- Zeliard (1987): Graphic design
- Faria: A World of Mystery and Danger (1989): Graphic design
- Musashi no Bouken (1991): Graphic design
- Ogre Battle (1993): Character design, tarot card design
- Philip & Marlowe in Bloomland (1994 (Note: Uncredited. Released in Japan as Taiyou no Tenshi Marlow: Ohanabatake wa Dai-Panic; an unreleased English prototype from 1991 crediting Quest staff, including Yoshida, was discovered in 2020.)): Graphic design (uncredited)
- Tactics Ogre (1995): Background art director, character design
- Final Fantasy Tactics (1997): Background art director, character design
- Vagrant Story (2000): Background art director, character design
- Wild Card (2001): Main visual
- Final Fantasy Tactics Advance (2003): Artistic supervisor
- Final Fantasy XII (2006): Background art supervisor, main character design
- Final Fantasy III (Nintendo DS) (2006): Character design
- Final Fantasy Tactics: The War of the Lions (2007): Background art director, character design
- Final Fantasy Tactics A2: Grimoire of the Rift (2007): Artistic supervisor
- Final Fantasy XII International Zodiac Job System (2007): Background art supervisor, main character design
- Final Fantasy: The 4 Heroes of Light (2009): Character design
- Final Fantasy XIV (2010): Art director, main character design
- Tactics Ogre: Let Us Cling Together (2010): Character design
- Dissidia 012 Final Fantasy (2011): Special thanks
- Bravely Default: Flying Fairy (2012): Main character design
- Bravely Default: Praying Brage (2012): Main character design
- Final Fantasy XIV: A Realm Reborn (2013): Lead artist, main character design
- Knights of Glory (2013): Main character design
- Battle Champs (2015): Main character design
- Bravely Second: End Layer (2015): Main character design
- Final Fantasy XIV: Heavensward (2015): Main character design
- Nier: Automata (2017): Main character design
- Final Fantasy XIV: Stormblood (2017): Main character design
- Final Fantasy XII: The Zodiac Age (2017): Promotional illustrator, main character design
- Lost Order (2017): Art director
- Maquia: When the Promised Flower Blooms (2018): Original character design
- Final Fantasy XIV: Shadowbringers (2019): Main character design
- Nier Reincarnation (2021): Main character design
- Nier Replicant ver.1.22474487139... (2021): Character illustration
- Little Noah: Scion of Paradise (2022): Character design
- Nier Automata ver1.1a (2023): Original character design
