= Ogre Battle Gaiden: Prince of Zenobia =

2000 strategy video game

- Developer: SNK
- Publisher: SNK
- Producer: Kazuto Kono
- Programmer: Kaneko Michiaki
- Artists: Eisuke Ogura; Shinbo
- Writers: Hideto Kanzaki; Shinji Goto
- Series: Ogre Battle
- Platform: Neo Geo Pocket Color
- Release: JP: June 22, 2000
- Genre: Tactical role-playing
- Modes: Single-player; Multiplayer

Ogre Battle Gaiden: Prince of Zenobia (Note: Densetsu no Ōga Batoru Gaiden: Zenobia no Ōji (Japanese: 伝説のオウガバトル外伝 ゼノビアの皇子; Legend of the Ogre Battle Side-story: The Prince of Zenobia)) is a 2000 real-time tactical role-playing game developed and published by SNK for the Neo Geo Pocket Color. The game is a spin-off within the Ogre Battle series, originally created by Quest Corporation. The storyline takes place parallel to Ogre Battle: The March of the Black Queen, and follows the path of Prince Tristan of Zenobia during his quest to reclaim his kingdom. As with other Ogre Battle titles, the player controls squads of an army, moving to different parts of the map accomplishing tasks and battling armies encountered on the route. Choices made during the narrative impact the ending.

Prince of Zenobia was developed by a self-appointed internal team at SNK after the intellectual property was licensed from Quest, with a casual atmosphere compared by staff to a doujin project. Production was described as troubled, with a delay being necessary to both adjust the scenario and polish the gameplay. The characters were designed by Eisuke Ogura, an SNK artist known his work on the Fatal Fury series. The game was supplemented by a guidebook, and a novelization with cover illustration by Ogura.

The game sold over 14,000 units in its first three days, reaching into the top ten best-selling titles of that week. Reception from critics has been mixed to positive, noting its graphical quality for the platform and replication of the series gameplay in portable form. Due to the failure of the Neo Geo console and consequent closure of SNK's North American offices after its buyout by Aruze, Prince of Zenobia was never officially released outside Japan. Some journalists have cited the title as needing a re-release on modern hardware.

== Gameplay ==
Standard field gameplay in Ogre Battle Gaiden: Prince of Zenobia.

Ogre Battle Gaiden: Prince of Zenobia is a tactical role-playing game in which the player progresses through up to 13 levels. The player, as protagonist Tristan, commands squads across area maps to fulfil set objectives. Before starting the game, the player determines the protagonist's attributes in the form of seven Major Arcana tarot cards. The player is given six cards based on their answers to six questions from a random pool of 22, and then freely selects one additional card.

Basic gameplay is similar to that of Ogre Battle: The March of the Black Queen, though with simplified mechanics and enemy behavior. Players move squads of units across 2D maps, occupying different towns and strongholds, and fighting enemy units in arena-like battle zones in real-time. Battles trigger when two sets of units meet, and combat ends when all units have completed their turns; the winning party is the one which has dealt the most damage overall. Battlefields have a day-night cycle impacting the efficiency of army units, and the actions of troops impact the morale of the inhabitants, influencing how characters interact and story events play out.

Each unit has a character class which dictates their abilities, such as fighters with strong melee attacks, or magic users with offensive and defensive spells. The classes are divided between unisex, male, female and monster-exclusive classes. Choices made in the scenario branch into different level sets exclusive to that route. If the player's units are defeated, they must resume from the latest save point. The game features a limited form of multiplayer; two consoles with the game can be connected via the link cable, with selected squads engaging in single skirmishes.

== Synopsis ==
Prince of Zenobia is set within March of the Black Queen. The people of Zenobia are in rebellion against the occupying Holy Zeteginean Empire. The storyline follows Tristan, a side character from March of the Black Queen, as he seeks to reclaim his kingdom from the control of the Black Knight Baldr. During the story's opening act, Tristan first organises an army of volunteers and pushes back bandits who have overtaken his land. During the second act, Tristan concentrates his efforts on Jenga, leader of the bandits. Depending in the route taken after the third act's opening battle, Tristan either liberates the prisoners of Sikto Prison, or proceeds straight to Baldr's forward base of Megaholten. Tristan's alignment to law or chaos is determined by the player's choice of routes, as well as their answers to a series of questions asked by Baldr. Following the dispersal of the volunteer army and depending on previous choices, Tristan either flees alone to divert the Empire's attention from his allies, remain in Zenobia to rebuild, or marches with chosen companions to topple the Empire.

== Development ==
The Ogre Battle series was originally created by Quest Corporation, which had made games on the Super Famicom, PlayStation and Nintendo 64. Quest agreed to license the Ogre Battle rights to SNK, the creators of the Neo Geo Pocket Color (NGPC), allowing them to develop and publish a game for their system. It was the first Ogre Battle to be developed for a handheld game console. The title was produced by Kazuto Kono, and had a team of five programmers led by Kaneko Michiaki. Unlike a standard production, the team assembled itself from across SNK based on self-recommendation and love of the Ogre Battle series, leading staff to compare the game's development to a doujin production. Due to cartridge limitations, some areas and battles from March of the Black Queen needed to be cut. The production proved turbulent for the team, particularly during the mastering process when major bugs were detected.

The title was a point of heavy discussion. While "Ogre Battle Gaiden" was chosen at an early stage, the scenario was still in flux and the subtitle was ultimately suggested by Kono in reference to the planned storyline. While the game acted as a side story to March of the Black Queen, it was an original story created by SNK, requiring effort to keep events consistent with the original game's narrative. The scenario was co-written by Hideto Kanzaki and Shinji Goto. Fairly late into production, once the gameplay systems were mostly solidified, the team felt that their narrative was lacking compared to the original. While it was too late to change the overall narrative without a delay, Kanzaki agreed to rewrite the dialogue to be more mature. Still, the game was delayed so the gameplay could be polished and the rewrite could be finished, leading to more costs that could only be covered with a higher sales target.

The characters for Prince of Zenobia were designed by Eisuke Ogura, an in-house artist recognised for his work on SNK's Fatal Fury series. When choosing who would create the artwork, all team members submitted artwork in secret to be judged by the team as a whole, and Ogura's artwork of protagonist Tristan was chosen at the suggestion of the game's graphic designer, an artist credited as Shinbo. The staff were impressed at Ogura's competence with the illustration work as he was a relative newcomer in the company. In addition to character designs, Ogura created promotional artwork for magazines. Ogura continued working even through an illness, impressing the rest of his team.

== Release ==
In September 1999, Prince of Zenobia was announced for release in March 2000. It was later rescheduled for April. SNK displayed the game at the 2000 Tokyo Game Show, with a final release date of June 22, 2000. The team held a launch party to celebrate with their families, before they were dispersed into other projects. Along with the standard release, SNK also released a limited edition packaged with the NGPC. The release was supplemented by a guidebook published by Enterbrain in July, and a novelization written by Masaru Takeuchi and published by MediaWorks in September. The novel's cover art was created by Ogura.

The game was never announced for a Western release, and the commercial failure of the NGPC meant it would never happen: Aruze acquired SNK and shut down its North American offices in 2000. It remains the only Ogre Battle title not to have an official English release. A fan translation is currently being worked on, with the most recent update in 2019.

== Reception ==
Reception

Review scores
Publication	Score
Famitsu	28/40
Gamers' Republic	B

During its first three days on sale, Prince of Zenobia reached eighth place in game sales charts, selling over 14,200 units. This was noted as high sales for an NGPC game, which had a very low market share compared to other portable consoles.

In a preview of the game, IGN's Peer Schneider positively noted its many replicated mechanics, and expressed excitement for any possible Western release. GameFan's Eric C. Mylonas, in a preview of Ogre Battle 64, criticized the lack of localization for Prince of Zenobia in reference to the niche status of Ogre Battle as a whole.

Japanese gaming magazine Famitsu was generally positive about the title, calling it an accurate reproduction of the Ogre Battle series gameplay, with criticism focusing on shortcomings caused by its hardware limitations. Spanish gaming magazine GamesTech noted Prince of Zenobia as SNK's "definitive attempt" to attract fans to their platform, citing its graphics as some of the system's best and noting its ease of play.

In 2014, HobbyConsolas listed Prince of Zenobia as one of the 20 best games for the NGPC. Kurt Kalata of Hardcore Gaming 101 described the title as "not remarkable, but it's definitely worthwhile", noting both its replication of series gameplay on the platform and its scaling back of mechanics following the release of Ogre Battle 64. Both Kerry Brunskill of Nintendo Life and Siliconera's Graham Russell mentioned Prince of Zenobia as a Neo Geo title deserving a modern re-release. In 2023, Time Extension also identified Prince of Zenobia as one of the best games for the NGPC.
