= Tactics Ogre: Let Us Cling Together (2010 video game) =

- Developer: Square Enix
- Publisher: Square Enix
- Director: Hiroshi Minagawa
- Producer: Eisuke Yokoyama
- Designer: Yasumi Matsuno
- Programmer: Takashi Katano
- Artists: Akihiko Yoshida; Tsubasa Masao
- Writer: Yasumi Matsuno
- Composers: Hitoshi Sakimoto; Masaharu Iwata
- Series: Ogre Battle
- Platforms: Let Us Cling Together; PlayStation Portable; Reborn; Nintendo Switch; PlayStation 4 PlayStation 5 Windows
- Release: Let Us Cling Together: JP: November 11, 2010; NA: February 15, 2011; AU: February 24, 2011; EU: February 25, 2011; Reborn: WW: November 11, 2022
- Genre: Tactical role-playing
- Modes: Single-player, multiplayer

Tactics Ogre: Let Us Cling Together (Note: Release in Japan as Tactics Ogre: Wheel of Fortune (Japanese: タクティクスオウガ 運命の輪, Hepburn: Takutikusu Ōga: Unmei no Wa)) is a 2010 tactical role-playing game developed and published by Japanese company Square Enix. It is a remake of the 1995 Super Famicom (Super Nintendo Entertainment System) title of the same name, second entry in the Ogre Battle series. The remake retains the same strategy RPG gameplay of the original, focusing on turn-based tactical battles and the use of character classes. The game incorporates additional features such as equipment crafting and the ability to revisit branch points in the game's narrative, in addition to multiplayer functionality. The storyline, following the actions of rebel fighter Denam Pavel during a civil war within the kingdom of Valeria, was also expanded with new scenes and characters.

The remake was conceived following the release of Final Fantasy Tactics: The War of the Lions (2007), taking four years to complete. It was directed by original artist Hiroshi Minagawa, who assembled most of the original staff including writer and designer Yasumi Matsuno, and composers Hitoshi Sakimoto and Masaharu Iwata. Original artist Akihiko Yoshida returned to supervise the art direction, with many characters redesigned by Tsubasa Masao. The English localization was handled by Alexander O. Smith and Joseph Reeder, who had worked with Matsuno on games set in the Ivalice universe. Downloadable content based around the new gameplay systems was released for free in Japan post-release, and bundled into the Western release. Releasing to strong sales in Japan and North America, the remake met with a positive reception from journalists.

A remastered version, titled Tactics Ogre: Reborn, was released for Nintendo Switch, PlayStation 4, PlayStation 5, and Windows on November 11, 2022. It contains revised battle mechanics, remastered sound and music and full English and Japanese voice acting.

== Content and gameplay ==
A battle from the Tactics Ogre remake, with two characters pitted against each other during a player turn; shown are the units involved, turn timeline, equipment and weapons, and statistics.

Tactics Ogre: Let Us Cling Together is a PlayStation Portable (PSP) remake of the 1995 Super Famicom (Super Nintendo Entertainment System) title of the same name. While the remake features gameplay changes, the central narrative remains the same. Tactics Ogre is set in the island kingdom of Valeria, once riven with war between its three ethnic groups but united under the Dynast-King Dorgalua Oberyth. Following Dorgalua's death without an heir, the ethnic groups splintered and began fighting for the throne. They divided into the aristocratic Bakram led by the Regent Brantyn, the populous Galgastani led by Hierophant Balbatos, and the less-populous Walister led by Duke Ronwey. The Bakram and Galgastani divide Valeria between them and oppress the Walister people. The narrative follows members of the Walister resistance−protagonist Denam Pavel, his sister Catiua, and childhood friend Vyce−as they rebel against their oppressors with the help of a Xenobian mercenary group led by Lanselot Hamilton. Starting with the opening chapter, the storyline branches based on choices made by Denam, leading to different character interactions and endings.

The game uses a turn-based battle system in zones selected from an overworld map, with enemy forces being controlled by the game's artificial intelligence (AI). New playable characters or units either join the party or can be recruited during the story. Units are placed across a grid-based level, with players able to switch between the default overhead diagonal view, and a top-down view with flattened topography. Using a variety of weapons, the player can move and attack, use items, and perform magic using a pool of magic points which charge up from nothing over the course of a battle. The turn order is dictated by each unit's speed statistic and current weight. The terrain and current weather along with the current character class also influence a unit's range and movement abilities. Once a town is available following its liberation or capture, the shop can be used to buy new equipment and items, and synthesize those from materials gathered from missions. Victory rewards are experience points to raise character class level, skill points to upgrade and unlock abilities, and items and in-game money. The game features a form of multiplayer, where players can download other player-created teams and face them in a separate arena. All characters are set at the same level, allowing for fair competition, and the enemy team is AI controlled.

The original game featured a series of morality-based questions before starting the game, with the remake incorporating Major Arcana tarot cards. Each answer grants five of 22 randomly selected tarots which impact Denam's statistical strengths and weaknesses. A feature carried over from the original game are tarot cards dropped by enemies, acting as consumable items which impact a unit's abilities for a short period. Two new features themed after tarot cards are the Chariot and World systems. The Chariot system records the player's progress up to fifty turns back, allowing them to undo up to that many moves and redo that section of the battle. The World system, accessed through a lore database called the Warren Report once the player has gone through the campaign once, allows the player to enter decision points in the narrative and play through alternate routes without starting the game over again.

== Development ==
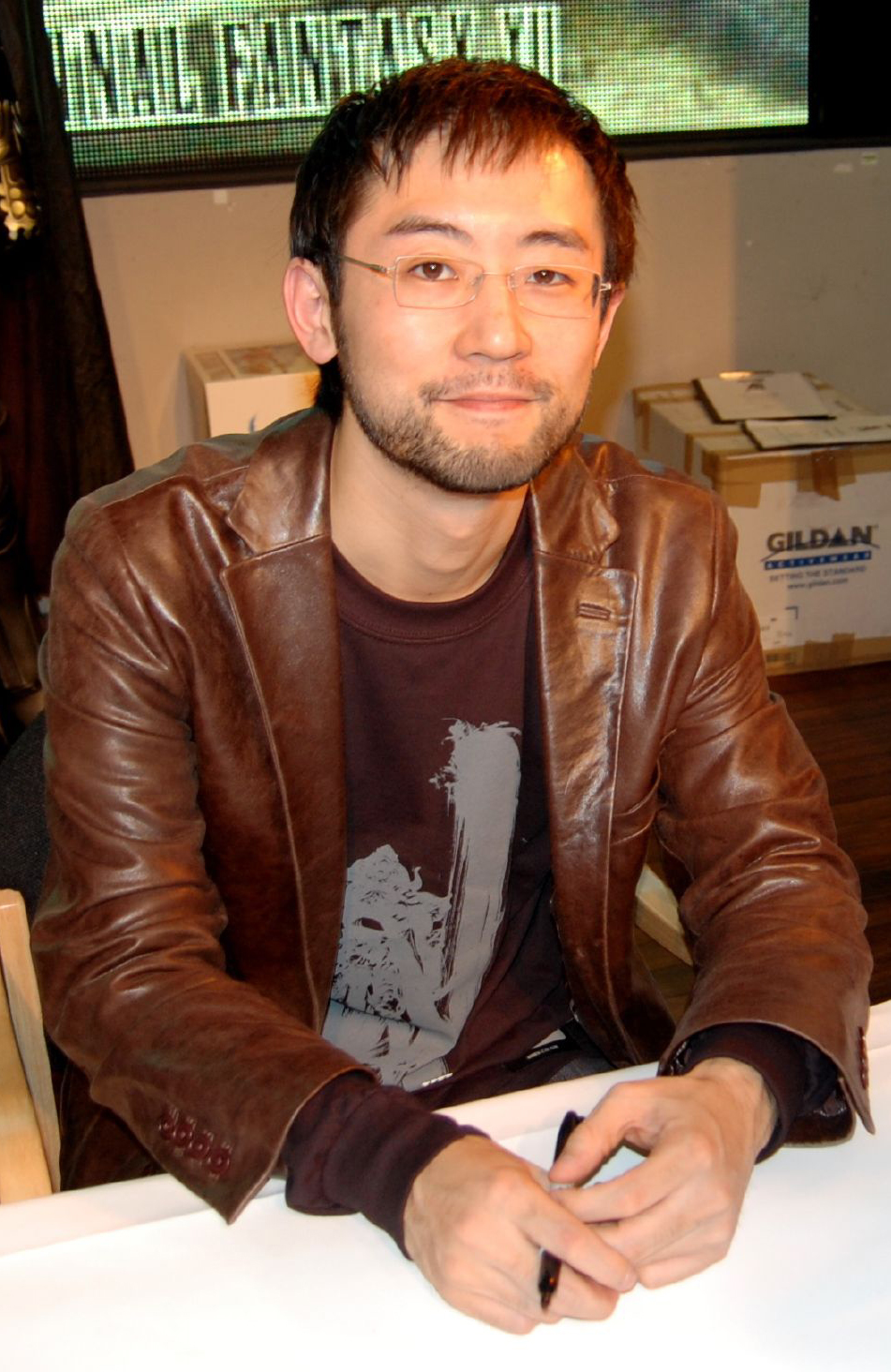
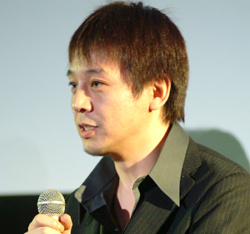
The original game's staff were reassembled for the remake, including Hiroshi Minagawa and Hitoshi Sakimoto, who directed the game and led music production respectively.

The original Tactics Ogre was developed by Quest Corporation as part of the Ogre Battle series, directly following the success of Ogre Battle: March of the Black Queen. Production was led by series creator Yasumi Matsuno, who acted as director, writer and designer. Following the release of Tactics Ogre, Matsuno and a number of staff members moved to Square (predecessor of Square Enix) and developed Final Fantasy Tactics (1997), going on to develop multiple titles in its universe of Ivalice. Quest Corporation continued production on the Ogre Battle series until it was purchased and absorbed into Square following the release of Tactics Ogre: The Knight of Lodis (2002). Matsuno remained at the company until 2005, when he left during the production of Final Fantasy XII citing ill health.

Concept work for a remake of Tactics Ogre began in May 2007 at Square Enix following the release of Final Fantasy Tactics: The War of the Lions, an updated port of Final Fantasy Tactics for the PSP. A remake had been demanded both by fans and staff, with Square Enix approving it when suggested by Hiroshi Minagawa, one of the original game's artists. At this early stage, it was to be a faithful remake with minimal changes. Minagawa wanted to reassemble as much of the original staff as possible for the project. This included bringing back Matsuno, who by this time was working in a freelance capacity with Sega and PlatinumGames on MadWorld. Matsuno initially refused, but when Minagawa changed the plan so the remake would include changes for modern audiences, he agreed to join the project. Minagawa described Matsuno's presence on the remake's development team as "essential".

Minagawa took on the role of director. His main role was to organize the in-house staff and coordinate with the team divisions. Matsuno returned as designer and writer. Other returning staff included original artist Akihiko Yoshida, and composers Hitoshi Sakimoto and Masaharu Iwata. Matsuno played a role in gathering the original staff after coming on board. It took a year to get all the staff together for the project and ensure their schedules were free, then three years to develop the game. It was produced by Eisuke Yokoyama, who had previously worked on Final Fantasy XII: Revenant Wings. The programmer was Takashi Katano. Alongside the returning staff members, the team included people who had worked on Ogre Battle 64: Person of Lordly Caliber and Tactics Ogre: The Knight of Lodis, some who had worked on the Final Fantasy Tactics series, and staff members completely new to the series. Minagawa commented that the new staff members, fans of the original game, remembered the smaller details better than the original developers. The "compact" nature of the team allowed small detailed adjustments to the game without causing problems.

=== Design ===
Rather than describing it as a remake or a remaster, Matsuno defined the remake as a "re-imagining" of the original title. The PSP was chosen as the game's platform to provide an "intimate" viewing experience, and to give players with busy lives easy access to it. The gameplay was rebalanced compared to the original, increasing the party size, adding new recruitable characters, altering weapon statistics, and reworking the class system to be both more varied and be independent of units to allow for continued use after a unit's death. The developers included additional tutorial information compared to the original, but incorporated it contextually so it was not forced on players while also allowing genre beginners to enjoy the game. Character recruitment was also rebalanced, although it ended up being more difficult than in the original.

During the second half of production, the Chariot and World systems were added in at Matsuno's suggestion, giving players more freedom to both rectify mistakes and play other story routes. The Chariot system was meant as a tool for beginners, but the gameplay was adjusted so there was a random element that would alter the actions of enemies, preventing players from exploiting the system. This also carried over into any attempts by players to use save states, preserving the general challenge. An early plan was for players to be able to go back 100 moves in the Chariot system, but was deemed too generous and reduced to the final count of fifty. Minagawa felt that he and Matsuno were able to include almost everything they wanted to, comparing it to an omnibus edition of the original game.

While keeping the graphics faithful to the Super Famicom original, the team stopped short of making the game look "cheap" by reproducing the graphics without any updates. The increased resolution and hardware specifications of the PSP allowed the UI displays to be expanded, and the text to be redone for legibility. The fields and stages were rebuilt in 3D, with 2D character sprites overlaid and painted to appear like classic pixel art. The artwork was managed by Yoshida, but much of the character art and other artistic elements were reworked by Tsubasa Masao, an artist known for his work on Metal Gear Acid and Final Fantasy: The 4 Heroes of Light. Masao's work focused on redesigning the characters while retaining recognizable features from their original designs, including facial features and general clothing. Minagawa also helped with the art design.

While the original game featured 300,000 characters of writing, the remake's expansions pushed this number to over 700,000, more than the script for Final Fantasy XII. In addition to new work, Matsuno was also able to rewrite his earlier work. He wrote the additions to the main scenario himself, but due to the volume of work he created rough scenarios for a team of writers to work on for side content, doing small rewrites where necessary. The team included Kazuhiro Kataoka, who had worked on Ogre Battle 64; Yuichi Murasawa and Kyoko Kitahara, who had written both Tactics Ogre: The Knight of Lodis and titles within the Ivalice series; Motoharu Tanaka, whose work included Final Fantasy entries and Parasite Eve; and Tsuyoshi Tomooka of The Last Remnant. Other staff again worked on supplementary material such as the Warren Report. Matsuno also created the concepts for new characters and gave them to other writers. Matsuno raised the ages of several younger characters, partly to be more acceptable in the Western market. He originally planned to raise Denam's age to 23, but as this would have clashed with the story's themes of youthful rebellion, he settled on making him 18.

=== Music ===
The music was arranged and expanded by Sakimoto and Iwata. Iwata acted as soundtrack director, while Sakimoto supervised the project. Arrangements were created by Sakimoto, Iwata, Mitsuhiro Kaneda, Noriyuki Uekura, Azusa Chiba and Yoshimi Kudo. The orchestration was handled by Nicole Brady, who had previously collaborated on several of Sakimoto's projects including Valkyria Chronicles and Romeo × Juliet. A 4-CD soundtrack album was released on November 10, 2010. The first three discs included the re-recorded and new music, while the fourth disc included a selection of music from the Super Famicom original.

Sakimoto felt conflicted about the tracks, wondering whether to preserve the original style or completely rewrite it. He and Iwata decided to preserve the style, expanding it using additional more complex orchestration. While the original music was well-liked, the tracks were fairly short, so part of the musical additions was adding second halves to the loops, extending the existing tracks. The music was performed by the Sydney Symphony Orchestra, with whom Sakimoto had worked in the past. In addition to the remixed and extended original tracks, ten new tracks were included. One of them was for a music box kept by the character Hamilton. The original was fairly dark fitting with a scene where the music box featured showing Hamilton in a physically and mentally broken condition, while the new version was written to be more believable as a love token from Hamilton's deceased wife.

== Release ==
The remake was announced in July 2010. The Japanese subtitle Wheel of Fortune, which referenced the new tarot-themed mechanics, was taken from the tarot card of the same name. Wallpapers and ring tones inspired by the remake were included in the mobile port of Ogre Battle: The March of the Black Queen, released in September. The Tactics Ogre remake was released on November 11 as a physical and digital release. Between December 2010 and January 2011, three free pieces of downloadable content (DLC) were released, featuring scenarios focusing on Denam using the World system to rewrite earlier events. The scenarios covered the characters of Warren and Hamilton, and the attack on Denam's home town that featured in the game's opening. Matsuno created the scenario for the DLC, and found his stories for Hamilton and Warren moved him to tears. A guidebook was released in December, featuring gameplay information and a developer interview. An artbook featuring commentary from Yoshida and Masao was released in May 2011, and a fan book featuring artwork and developers answering fan questions was released in July.

A North American version (which retained its original subtitle of Let Us Cling Together) and European version were confirmed after the Japanese release. For its Western marketing, an animated trailer was created by animation studio Kamikaze Douga, depicting key scenes from the narrative and featuring a unique track created by Sakimoto. The trailer made use of cel-shaded animation mapped onto motion captured models. The game was released in North America on February 15, 2011, with select retailers offering a pre-order bonus of tarot carts designed by Yoshida. It launched in Australia on February 24. The European release on February 25 included a limited Premium Edition featuring the tarot set, an artbook, and a mini soundtrack CD. The Japanese DLC was included in the retail game for Western territories.

A PlayStation port of Tactics Ogre had been localized for North America by Atlus USA in 1998. For the PSP port, the localization was redone by Square Enix. The English script was written by Alexander O. Smith and Joseph Reeder, who had previously worked with Matsuno on titles set within his Ivalice universe, particularly Vagrant Story and Final Fantasy XII. Localization began early in the game's development, with Smith and Reeder working closely with Matsuno. Taking inspiration from the multicultural history of Constantinople and Byzantine Greece, they reworked the terminology to incorporate Greek references, in addition to changing the "Z"s into "X"s to add a foreign element. They wished to use the Hittite civilization as a reference, but due to a lack of knowledge about Hittite writing mixed in what they could find with the Greek influence.

The changes to English character names, such as changing Denim Powell to Denam Pavel, were done at Matsuno's request to distance the characters from real-world people and titles. The scripting was divided into two categories, story dialogue and gameplay terminology. The decision was made not to reference the Final Fantasy series, keeping Tactics Ogre as a separate entity despite sharing staff. Smith approached the dialogue as if it were a Western-developed title, giving characters a "laconic" speaking style without too many additions and adjustments to tone depending on character backgrounds. They also used the game's tarot card theming as a "touchstone" for the dialogue's archaic tone. The game's prologue featured voice work by Simon Templeman and Kate Higgins, done in an archaic style similar to Final Fantasy XII.

== Reception ==
Reception

Aggregate score
Aggregator	Score
Metacritic	87/100

Review scores
Publication	Score
1Up.com	A+
Eurogamer	9/10
Famitsu	36/40
Game Informer	9/10
GameSpot	9/10
GamesRadar+	4.5/5
GameTrailers	9.1/10
IGN	8.5/10
PALGN	8½/10
Play	81%
PSM3	8/10
RPGamer	4.5/5
RPGFan	93/100

Awards
Publication	Award
GamesRadar+	Best PSP Exclusive
GameSpot	Best Remake

Reborn

Aggregate score
Aggregator	Score
Metacritic	NS: 84/100; PC: 84/100; PS5: 86/100

Review scores
Publication	Score
Eurogamer	Recommended
GameSpot	8/10
Hardcore Gamer	4/5
HobbyConsolas	80/100
Nintendo Life	7/10
Nintendo World Report	8/10
PC Gamer (US)	86/100
Push Square	8/10
Shacknews	8/10
VG247	5/5

Upon its debut in Japan, the remake reached the top of game charts, recording sales of over 176,000 units during the first week. It had a sell-through rate of roughly 65%. By the end of 2010, it was the 48th best-selling game of the year, with sales of over 257,000 units. In North America during February 2011, it was the top-selling PSP title in the region according to data collected by The NPD Group. Speaking in April, Matsuno described the game as a commercial success. Tactics Ogre: Reborn was the highest selling physical game during its first week of release in Japan, moving 36,783 units on Switch, 12,668 units on PlayStation 4, and 7,805 units on PlayStation 5 for an opening week total of 57,256 retail copies sold.

On review aggregator website Metacritic, Tactics Ogre received a score of 87 points out of 100 based on 49 critic reviews. It was named as the "Best PSP Exclusive" by GamesRadar during their 2011 Platinum Chalice Awards. In GameSpot's Best of 2011, it was awarded "Best Remake".

Japanese gaming magazine Famitsu principally gave praise to the gameplay additions and greater accessibility for casual players. Jeremy Parish, writing for 1Up.com, awarded the website's highest score, lauding the gameplay additions and technical superiority compared to the earlier PlayStation port and citing it as a masterpiece despite potential problems with lowered difficulty. Eurogamer's Simon Parkin noted the size and occasional difficulty spikes in Tactics Ogre as potential negatives, but otherwise praised it as a good remake. Adam Beissener of Game Informer enjoyed the game overall, but felt some of the alterations had padded character progression. GameSpot's Kat Bailey called it "the best tactical RPG available on the PSP today", giving praise to much of its content and design. GamesRadar's Nathan Grayson praised the title as mechanically superior to many later titles in the genre, additionally noting the remake's additions which allowed it to be enjoyed by younger players.

GameTrailers enjoyed the expansions to the narrative and gameplay, praising it for the breadth of content for players. Patrick Kolan of IGN was very positive about the expansions and how well the original gameplay held up, but found the interface difficult to manage, an issue made more evident by the amount of unit management required. Kimberley Ellis of PALGN held the game up as an example for good remakes, praising it as a solid genre entry for the platform despite small issues with its interface and battery life. Ryan King of Play noted a lack of innovative features in its story and gameplay, but praised it as "one of the most competent, solid, well-put-together J-RPGs you will ever play", comparing it to a compressed refinement of its genre. RPGamer's Zach Welhouse gave general praise to the game and its additions, additionally noting the localization, but disliked the graphics and noted issues with its story delivery undermining some of the major plot developments. Bryan Grosnick of RPGFan cited it as an excellent game for the hardcore genre fan, noting its nostalgic approach to the original alongside its additions, but faulting the slow pace of its battles.

The narrative was praised and positively compared to Matsuno's other work, though King criticised it for a lack of innovation within its genre, and Ellis found the writing style made the story progress slow despite strong narrative payoffs. The gameplay saw general praise for its enjoyability, balance and depth compared to many later titles and series. The lowered difficulty compared to the original was a common point of commentary, mainly praising but also noting that hardcore fans might dislike the change, but still noting high challenge. The artificial intelligence was also noted for erratic behavior, and there was criticism for the minimal integration of multiplayer. Several outlets praised it as a technically superior English version to the earlier PlayStation release. The additions of the World and Chariot systems were praised for the expansions brought to the game. The graphics were seen as faithfully recreated if lacking spectacle compared to other titles on the platform, while the music saw generally positive responses.
