= Masaharu Iwata =

Japanese composer (born 1966)

Masaharu Iwata 岩田 匡治
- Also known as: REZON
- Born: October 26, 1966 (age 59); Tokyo, Japan
- Genres: Symphonic; electronica; jazz
- Occupations: Composer; musician
- Instruments: Piano; electronic organ; synthesizer
- Years active: 1987–present

Masaharu Iwata (岩田 匡治, Iwata Masaharu; born October 26, 1966) is a Japanese video game composer. In high school his musical projects included composing on a synthesizer and playing in a cover band. After graduating from high school he joined Bothtec as a composer. He composed the soundtrack to several games there, beginning with 1987's Bakusou Buggy Ippatsu Yarou. After Bothtec was merged into Quest Corporation, he left to become a freelance composer.

Some of his notable projects include Ogre Battle, Tactics Ogre, Final Fantasy Tactics, and Final Fantasy XII. He was one of the founding members of Basiscape, headed by fellow composer and friend Hitoshi Sakimoto. His compositions for Ogre Battle and Final Fantasy Tactics have been cited as among the most well-recognized in the tactical RPG genre.

== Biography ==
=== Early life ===
Iwata, born in Tokyo, Japan on October 26, 1966, has been interested in music since he was a child, though he terms his first attempts at "experiments with music" while at school to be poor. While in junior high school, he became interested in the Japanese electropop group, Yellow Magic Orchestra. This inspired him to buy a synthesizer, and join a cover band with some other students. Other musical influences on him during his youth were Arabesque, John Foxx, China Crisis and Bill Nelson. It was during this time that video games began to be popular, leading him to become interested in them like many of his friends. Once he graduated high school, Iwata tried to find work that combined his love of music and video games, and joined Bothtec, which while he was there became part of Quest.

=== Career ===
While working at Bothtec as a part-time composer, Iwata composed his first piece in 1987, the ending theme to Bakusou Buggy Ippatsu Yarou. Soon afterward he scored his first full game, Relics: Ankoku Yousai. While at Bothec, Iwata met Hitoshi Sakimoto, who was a freelance composer working on games for the company while still in high school. The two became friends, and the next game Iwata scored was a collaboration with Sakimoto for the 1988 shooter game Revolter, published by ASCGroup for the NEC PC-8801. Iwata remained at Bothtec for a few years more, and left around a year after the company merged into Quest in 1990. He did not join up with another company, instead becoming a freelance composer like Sakimoto.

Over the next few years Iwata composed music for titles from a number of different companies, including Quest. On several of these titles he was credited by the nickname REZON. The nickname comes from the name of the car the hero drove in a show he watched as a child, and he picked it up as he liked the sound of it. Iwata's first encounter with mainstream success in Japan came about in 1993 when he composed Ogre Battle: March of the Black Queen along with Sakimoto. The soundtrack included a wide variety of instrumentation in its orchestral score, which was new to the composers who chose some instruments from a musical instrument description book Iwata had found. This collaboration led to Iwata co-composing several titles with Sakimoto over the next few years, culminating with his first brush with international success with Final Fantasy Tactics in 1997. On these collaborations, the two typically divided up the work and worked on their own tracks, rather than co-compose each piece. Iwata also collaborated with several other artists during this period in his career, including Toshiaki Sakoda and Masanobu Tsukamoto.

In 2002, Iwata became one of the founding members of Basiscape, currently the largest independent video game music production company, along with Sakimoto, who heads the company, and Manabu Namiki. Basiscape composes and produces music and sound effects for various types of interactive media, most notably video games. Sakimoto says that he left Square to found the company because he did not feel that he had enough "freedom" as an employee of a game company, though he notes that the cost of that freedom is the difficulty in remaining close to the development team. The composers for the company are able to procure individual work for themselves as members of Basiscape, as well as collaborate with other staff members on projects that are hired out to Basiscape as a company rather than any one composer. This allows the composers to remain freelancers while having the steady work of a full-time job. Iwata has composed much of his work since joining the company in collaboration with other Basiscape artists, both as the lead composer and as a member of a large group. Since becoming part of Basiscape, Iwata has gone on to compose for over 50 other titles, including big-name works such as Final Fantasy XII, Odin Sphere, and Soulcalibur IV.

== Works ==
=== Video games ===
Composer

- Bakusou Buggy Ipatsu Yarou (1987)
- Relics: Ankoku Yousai (1987)
- Revolver (1988) – with Hitoshi Sakimoto
- Fantasy Zone (1989)
- Starship Rendezvous (1990) – with Hitoshi Sakimoto
- Barbatus no Majo (1990)
- Battle Ping Pong (1990)
- Conquest of the Crystal Palace (1990)
- Dungeon Kid (1990)
- Might and Magic Book One: The Secret of the Inner Sanctum (1990)
- Musashi no Bouken (1990)
- Rush Up (1990)
- King Breeder (1991) – with Hitoshi Sakimoto
- Cowboy Kid (1991)
- Over Horizon (1991)
- Shikinjou (1991)
- Robocco Wars (1991)
- Verytex (1991) – with Hitoshi Sakimoto and Yoshio Furukawa
- Magical Chase (1991) – with Hitoshi Sakimoto
- America Oudan Ultra Quiz: Shijou Saidai no Tatakai (1991)
- Gimme a Break: Shijou Saikyou no Quiz Ou Ketteisen (1991)
- Cyber Block Metal Orange (1991) – with Hitoshi Sakimoto and Yoshio Furukawa
- Aa Yakyuu Jinsei Itchokusen (1992)
- Baseball Stars 2 (1992)
- Gimme a Break: Shijou Saikyou no Quiz Ou Ketteisen 2 (1992)
- Burning Paper (1992)
- Carat (1992) – with Hitoshi Sakimoto and Yoshio Furukawa
- King Salmon: The Big Catch (1992)
- Aa Yakyuu Jinsei Itchokusen (1992)
- Ushio to Tora: Shin'en no Daiyō (1993)
- The Gorilla Man (1993)
- Pingu: Sekai de Ichiban Genki na Penguin (1993)
- Ogre Battle: The March of the Black Queen (1993) – with Hitoshi Sakimoto and Hayato Matsuo
- Gauntlet IV (1993) – with Hitoshi Sakimoto
- Kingdom Grand Prix (1994) – with Hitoshi Sakimoto
- Dragon Master Silk: Episode II (1995) – with Hitoshi Sakimoto
- Tactics Ogre (1995) – with Hitoshi Sakimoto
- Treasure Hunter G (1996) – with many others
- Chip Chan Kick! (1996) – with Hitoshi Sakimoto and Yoshio Furukawa
- Bloody Roar (video game) (1997) – with Atsuhiro Motoyama, Kenichi Koyano, Manabu Namiki, and Hitoshi Sakimoto
- Final Fantasy Tactics (1997) – with Hitoshi Sakimoto
- Armed Police Batrider (1998)
- Baroque (1998)
- Bloody Roar 2 (1999) – with Manabu Namiki, Kenichi Koyano, and Jin Watanabe
- Evolution: The World of Sacred Device (1999) – with Toshiaki Sakoda and Masanobu Tsukamoto
- Evolution 2: Far Off Promise (1999) – with Toshiaki Sakoda and Masanobu Tsukamoto
- Ogre Battle 64 (1999) – with Hayato Matsuo
- Koguru Guruguru: Guruguru to Nakayoshi (2001)
- Tactics Ogre: The Knight of Lodis (2001) – with Hitoshi Sakimoto
- Shadow Hearts (2001) – with Yoshitaka Hirota, Yasunori Mitsuda, and Ryo Fukuda
- Golgo 13 (2002) - for arcade
- DoDonPachi DaiOuJou (2003)
- Gekitou Pro Baseball (2003)
- Mushihimesama (2004) – with Manabu Namiki
- Digi Communication 2 in 1 Datou! Black Gemagema Dan (2004) – with Manabu Namiki and Kenichi Koyano
- Battle B-Daman (2004) – with Kenichi Koyano, Kimihiro Abe, and Manabu Namiki
- Kuusen II (2004) – with Manabu Namiki
- Fullmetal Alchemist: Dream Carnival (2004) – with Manabu Namiki and Mitsuhiro Kaneda
- Stella Deus (2004) – with Hitoshi Sakimoto
- Jikuu Bouken Zentrix (2005) – with Manabu Namiki
- Zoids: Full Metal Crash (2005) – Basiscape
- Wizardry Gaiden: Prisoners of the Battles (2005) – with Mitsuhiro Kaneda, Hitoshi Sakimoto, and Kenichi Koyano
- Fantasy Earth: Zero (2006) – with Hitoshi Sakimoto, Manabu Namiki, and Kenichi Koyano
- Monster Kingdom: Jewel Summoner (2006) – with many others
- Children of Mana (2006) – with Kenji Ito and Takayuki Aihara
- Final Fantasy XII (2006) – with Hitoshi Sakimoto and Hayato Matsuo
- IGPX: Immortal Grand Prix (2006) – with Yasushi Asada, Mitsuhiro Kaneda, and Kimihiro Abe
- Eyeshield 21: Devilbats Devildays (2006) – with Basiscape
- Digimon Battle Terminal (2006) – with Basiscape
- Battle Stadium D.O.N. (2006) – with Basiscape
- Bleach: Heat the Soul 3 (2006) – with Manabu Namiki, Mitsuhiro Kaneda, and Kimihiro Abe
- Digimon World Data Squad (2006) – with Basiscape
- Grim Grimoire (2007) – with Basiscape
- Odin Sphere (2007) – with Basiscape
- Bleach: Heat the Soul 4 (2007) – with Basiscape
- Deltora Quest: The Seven Jewels (2007) – with Basiscape
- A.S.H. -Archaic Sealed Heat- (2007) – with Hitoshi Sakimoto
- Opoona (2007) – with Basiscape
- Soulcalibur Legends (2007) – with Basiscape
- Tekken 6 (2007) – with Basiscape and many others
- Doraemon Wii (2007) – with Basiscape
- Coded Soul (2008) – with Basiscape
- Elminage: Yami no Fujo to Kamigami no Yubiwa (2008) – with Basiscape
- Fate/unlimited codes (2008) – with Basiscape
- Soulcalibur IV (2008) – with Junichi Nakatsuru, Keiki Kobayashi, and Hiroyuki Fujita
- Suikoden Tierkreis (2008) – with Norikazu Miura and Yoshino Aoki
- Taiko no Tatsujin Wii (2008)
- The Wizard of Oz: Beyond the Yellow Brick Road (2008) – with Hitoshi Sakimoto, Michiko Naruke, and Kimihiro Abe
- Muramasa: The Demon Blade (2009) – with Basiscape
- Bleach: Heat the Soul 6 (2009) – with Basiscape
- Soulcalibur: Broken Destiny (2009) – with Junichi Nakatsuru and Keiki Kobayashi
- NHK Kōhaku Quiz Gassen (2009) – with Basiscape
- Z.H.P. Unlosing Ranger VS Darkdeath Evilman (2010) – with Basiscape
- Tactics Ogre: Let Us Cling Together (2010) – remake, with Hitoshi Sakimoto and Hayato Matsuo
- Learn with Pokémon: Typing Adventure (2011) – with Azusa Chiba and Kimihiro Abe
- Half-Minute Hero: The Second Coming (2011) – with many others
- Grand Knights History (2011) – with Basiscape
- Majikoi: Oh! Samurai Girl (2011) – with Basiscape
- The Denpa Men: They Came By Wave (2012) – with Basiscape
- Crimson Shroud (2012) – with Basiscape
- The Denpa Men 2: Beyond the Waves (2012) – with Basiscape
- The Denpa Men 3: The Rise of Digitoll (2013) – with Basiscape
- The Denpa Men Free! (2014) – with Basiscape
- Age of Ishtaria (2014) – with Hitoshi Sakimoto
- Grand Kingdom (2015) – with Basiscape
- Odin Sphere: Leifthrasir (2016) – with Basiscape
- Memories of the Blue (2016) – with Basiscape
- Final Fantasy XII: The Zodiac Age (2017) – with Hitoshi Sakimoto
- Caravan Stories (2017) – with Basiscape
- Tsuioku no Ao (2020) – with Basiscape

Arranger

- Final Fantasy Tactics A2: Grimoire of the Rift (2007)
- 25th Anniversary Rockman Techno Arrange Ver. (2012) (Hardman~Snakeman Medley)

=== Other ===
- 2197 (1999)
- Phantasy Star Online Episode I & II Premium Arrange (2004)
- Tekken: Blood Vengeance (2011)

Discography sources:
