= Tactics Ogre: The Knight of Lodis =

2001 tactical role-playing video game

- North American cover art
- Developer: Quest Corporation
- Publishers: JP: Nintendo; NA: Atlus USA
- Director: Yuichi Murasawa
- Programmer: Toshiaki Imai
- Artists: Ikumi Hachiro; Noriyuki Komoda
- Writer: Mizue Tanaka
- Composers: Hitoshi Sakimoto; Masaharu Iwata
- Series: Ogre Battle
- Platform: Game Boy Advance
- Release: JP: June 21, 2001; NA: May 7, 2002
- Genre: Tactical role-playing
- Mode: Single-player

Tactics Ogre: The Knight of Lodis (Note: (Japanese: タクティクスオウガ外伝 ザ・ナイト・オブ・ローディス)) is a tactical role-playing game developed by Quest Corporation and published by Nintendo for the Game Boy Advance (GBA). It was released in Japan in 2001, and in North America by Atlus USA in 2002. It is a spin-off of Tactics Ogre (1995), acting as a prequel to the rest of the Ogre Battle series. It was the last video game developed by Quest before their acquisition by Square.

The storyline follows Lodis soldier Alphonse Loeher as he learns of his country's oppression of the neighbouring land of Ovis and eventually turns against his former comrades. As with Tactics Ogre, the game is mission based, with combat taking place on grid-based battlefields and revolving around character classes and character statistics.

Production began at Quest after the company heard about the GBA hardware, envisioning a portable successor to Tactics Ogre. The aim was to replicate the gameplay and graphic style of Tactics Ogre on the platform while also making a more approachable storyline. Composers Hitoshi Sakimoto and Masaharu Iwata returned from earlier entries. Releasing to strong sales in Japan, the title saw generally positive reviews, with praising going to its graphics, gameplay and storyline. After Quest was absorbed into and rechristened as Square Product Development Division 4, the development team created Final Fantasy Tactics Advance.

== Gameplay ==
Tactics Ogre: The Knight of Lodis offers a strategic field-and-class based combat system. Although the player starts with a meager army of only six units (with the classes of those units being determined by questions the player answers in the beginning of the game), the army can later blossom to as many as 32.

Each character is unique, being determined by several things: material statistics, of which there are only three, strength, intelligence, and agility; alignment, ranging from chaotic to lawful; and element, based on the four classical elements. Characters can also earn emblems, certificates given after performing a specific feat or reaching a certain checkpoint. These emblems sometimes have no effect, often alter character statistics, some have a negative effect, and a few are required to advance to certain classes.

The game's playable units are divided into several categories; humans, demi-humans, dragons, Beasts, the undead, transcended beings and denizens of the netherworld. The human class is the only category with interchangeable jobs, with each class being marked by a required, or multiple required statistics, and often an emblem. Some classes can only be unlocked by a certain sex, while other classes are reserved only for certain special characters.

Demi-humans, non-humans, and the undead cannot change classes. Although all categories of units in the game can be persuaded in battle, the undead alone cannot be bought. Instead, undead units are created by using a certain spell on deceased units. Dragons change classes in a unique way: after reaching several checkpoints in statistics, a dragon will instantly upgrade into a certain new class, with the class being determined by the dragon's alignment. Once a dragon has upgraded, altering its alignment will automatically change its class.

After customization of the player's party, the group of units (of which the max limit on any story-based level is eight, with quest-based levels having a restriction of five) engage in combat.

Battle takes place on a large, panel-based playing field. The area is composed of terrain types and various height levels, making movement a critical factor. There are several movement types, ranging from simple walking to airborne flight. A character's movement type is determined by the class of that unit, as well as various special equipment which can change movement type. Terrain levels range from basic dirt and grass, to water (in varying depths and types), to impassable terrain, such as lava or blank space.

In actual combat, there are also many variations. Simple melee combat can be performed, either barehanded or with single-ranged weapons, to adjacent panels. This means the attacking unit must be directly next to the target, making mobility a critical ability. Some weapons offer different attack ranges, such as the two-paneled pierce attack of spear and lance weaponry, to the two-paneled selective attack range of the whip.

Ranged attacks require the use of either a bow weapon, or a special ability. With such emphasis on movement, ranged attacks are a certain advantage, as units can be far away from opponents, offering possible immunity to counterattack. Abilities require the use of either S.P. or M.P., which both regenerate at a rate of ten per player phase, and vary in impact sizes (panels).

When all units belonging to a specific force are exhausted, having performed their restrictive one action per phase (which includes both movement and ability usage, from attacks to items), the game changes to the opposing player's phase, and back and forth until certain victory conditions have been met by one player, such as destroying all opposing units.

== Plot ==
This game is a side story set before the events of Ogre Battle: The March of the Black Queen, Ogre Battle 64: Person of Lordly Caliber and Tactics Ogre: Let Us Cling Together.

Ovis is brutally oppressed by the knights of Lodis. Alphonse Loeher is a knight in Rictor Lasanti's military unit, the Order of the Sacred Flame, and he is sent to Ovis. When he is later separated from the main forces, he meets Eleanor Olato and Ivanna Batraal, two locals from whom he eventually learns the truth about the horrific events taking place in Ovis.

Various circumstances lead Alphonse to separate from Rictor's main unit. As the plot unfolds, Alphonse begins to question the actions and motives of Rictor. He then begins his search for answers, starting with Ivanna's uncle, the sinister regent Naris Batraal, and the sacred spear, Longicolnis, which is the only instrument that can pierce the skin of the sacred demon. It is later revealed that Rictor initially knew about the sacred spear and wanted to obtain it for the Lodis empire. About halfway through the game, the player is presented with two choices, which eventually leads to either his renewed trust or a falling out with Rictor. In fact, the player's choice will significantly affect all plot elements that follow.

After assaulting Naris Batraal's stronghold, it is revealed he is in league with the Fallen Angel, Shaher, who was imprisoned in Northern Ovis after being cast out from Heaven. Longicolnis is actually his own demonic horn which is both the only thing which can break his invincible barrier, and what shall allow him to be freed from his icy prison and begin his conquest of Ovis and the outside world.

There are five possible endings in the game (the Game Over scenario, which is gained by losing to the final boss, is also counted). The "A+" ending sequence features one additional scene which details Lans Tartare's past, in addition to the entire "A" ending sequence. To view the A+ ending, several conditions must be met, including completing the game in under 25 hours. The exact ending sequence with which the game presents the player depends on, among other things, the significant choice that the player has made halfway through the game and Eleanor's presence in the final battle. In particular, the "D" ending excludes Eleanor altogether.

== Development and release ==
Production began after series developer Quest Corporation heard about the production of Nintendo's Game Boy Advance. The team decided to make a project that would be a gameplay successor to Tactics Ogre. Many of the gameplay elements were carried directly over and expanded upon from the original. While keeping with the series tradition of mature storytelling, the narrative of The Knight of Lodis was made more approachable for younger audiences than the original Tactics Ogre. The art design was meant to evoke a cute deformed aesthetic for characters, although adhering to the series' established dark aesthetic made creating fields that showed well on the GBA screen a challenge. The music was composed by Hitoshi Sakimoto and Masaharu Iwata, who had both previously worked on multiple earlier entries in the Ogre Battle series. Iwata was pleased to work with Sakimoto again, but found music production challenging due to it being his first job for the GBA hardware.

The Knight of Lodis was announced in August 2000 in Japan. It was promoted in Japan with a live-action commercial featuring a player on a subway becoming a knight in armor. It was released by Nintendo on June 21, 2001 in Japan. It was re-released in the region as part of a budget series of GBA titles on February 2, 2006. A North American version was published by Atlus USA, who previously handled the North American releases of previous Ogre Battle titles. It was released in North America on May 7, 2002.

== Reception ==
Reception

Aggregate scores
Aggregator	Score
GameRankings	83%
Metacritic	88/100

Review scores
Publication	Score
Electronic Gaming Monthly	24.5/30
Famitsu	34/40
GamePro	4.5/5
GameSpot	9.1/10
GameSpy	80/100
IGN	8.5/10
Nintendo Power	4.5/5
RPGamer	5/5
Play Magazine	5/5

During its first week on sale, The Knight of Lodis sold over 150,000 units, reaching top place in Japanese sales charts. It continued to sell strongly into its second week. According to analytical company Media Create, the game sold just over 284,000 units, becoming one of the top forty best-selling titles of 2001. An alternate estimation places its combined two-week sales at over 340,000 units.

Review aggregate website GameRankings awarded the game a score of 83%, based on 26 critic reviews. Website Metacritic gave it a scored of 88/100 based on 20 reviews, indicating "generally favorable reviews". Japanese gaming magazine Famitsu praised the game's narrative and gameplay mechanics as fitting the Ogre series, though noted its lower difficulty compared to earlier titles.

Peer Schneider of IGN noted some archaic design elements and underwhelming music, but generally praised its design and complex narrative. Justin Speer, writing for GameSpot, positively noted its expanded gameplay mechanics despite highlighting its offputting high difficulty, calling it "a worthy addition to the Ogre Battle series". GameSpy's Tim McConnaughy similarly noted its music and high difficulty as low points, but generally praised it as a game to be enjoyed to fans of the genre. The three reviewers for Electronic Gaming Monthly each gave the title high praise, lauding its gameplay mechanics and graphics, but noting pacing issues due to unskippable battle animations and scaling problems with the text on the GBA screen. As part of their review, the game was granted the magazine's Silver Award.

Play Magazine's Michael Hobbs gave the title a perfect score, lauding it as a high quality addition to Quest's game library and essential buy for fans of the genre. RPGamer's Tony Green similarly gave it a perfect score, praising its gameplay and narrative while noting its music and audio as the weakest part of its presentation. GamePro awarded a near-perfect score, praising the graphic presentation and gameplay design, although the reviewer noted the niche appeal due to its deeper gameplay mechanics. The five reviewers for Nintendo Power all gave it high scores, with the review summary praising it for its "masterful RPG and strategic action".

== Legacy ==
The game was supported in Japan with multiple guidebooks. The first was published by Shogakukan in August 2001, and the following two guides released respectively by Mainichi Communications and Famitsu Bunko in September. The game provided inspiration for a four-panel comedy manga anthology in October 2001, and a standard manga anthology in November. Both were published by Kobunsha.

In an interview prior to release, the development staff said that future Ogre Battle or Tactics Ogre projects would be decided upon based on the company's wishes rather than external factors. The Knight of Lodis was the last project produced by Quest Corporation. Due to a number of factors, the company left the game development business and it was bought out and absorbed by Square. The Quest development team was restructured to form Square Product Development Division 4, and its first project for Square would be Final Fantasy Tactics Advance, released in 2003 for the GBA.
