= NHK Kōhaku Quiz Gassen =

2009 video game

- Game cover
- Developer: Nintendo EAD
- Publisher: Nintendo
- Composers: Masaharu Iwata; Mitsuhiro Kaneda; Kimihiro Abe; Azusa Chiba; Noriyuki Kamikura; Yoshimi Kudo
- Platform: Wii
- Release: JP: December 17, 2009
- Genre: Trivia
- Modes: Single-player, Multiplayer

NHK Kohaku Quiz Kassen (ＮＨＫ紅白クイズ合戦, NHK Kouhaku Kuizu Kassen, NHK Red & White Quiz Battle) is a trivia game developed and published by Nintendo in cooperation with NHK Enterprises. It was announced at Nintendo Conference Autumn 2008 in October 2, 2008 and released on December 17, 2009 in Japan only.

== Gameplay ==
Players use Miis as playable characters. Players answer questions about NHK television series. Each player or team gains points for answering correctly and loses points for answering incorrectly.

== Types ==
There are many game types in this game:

=== Original-type ===
- Kohaku Quiz Kassen
- Remote Panic Q
- Quiz Ring Match
- Rakki Slot Quiz
- Ota no Shimi Visual Quiz
- NHK Quiz 100

=== NHK-type ===
- ジェスチャー ( Gesture )
- クイズ面白ゼミナール ( Quiz Omoshiro Seminar, Quiz Interesting Seminar )
- 連想ゲーム ( Renso Game, Word Association Game )
- ためしてガッテン ( Tameshite Gatten, Science For Everyone )

== Wii Remote Share ==
Six players playing together will be divided onto two teams, being the Red and White teams, and each team shares only one Wii Remote.
