= Over Horizon =

1991 video game

- Developers: Pixel, Hot-B
- Publishers: JP: Hot-B; GER: Takara
- Director: Yoshinori Satake
- Producer: Yoshihiro Tonomura
- Designer: Yoshiki Miyagi
- Programmers: Hideki Kuwamura; Jun Saitō; Junichi Osajima
- Artists: Nekomata. K O. Yasuhisa
- Composer: Masaharu Iwata
- Platform: Nintendo Entertainment System
- Release: JP: April 26, 1991; GER: 1992
- Genre: Scrolling shooter
- Mode: Single-player

Over Horizon (Note: Japanese: オーバーホライゾン, Hepburn: Ōbā Horaizon) is a 1991 horizontally scrolling shooter co-developed by Pixel and Hot-B, published in Japan by Hot-B and in Germany by Takara for the Nintendo Entertainment System. Controlling the space fighter craft Michael, the player must destroy numerous enemies to stop the Gamma organization from using the alien creature Kassandra to take over the Alpharos star system.

Over Horizon was conceived as a "create your own shoot 'em up" game during a proposal with Pixel to re-use their engine from Dungeon Kid before being reworked into a standard shooter and Hot-B took over development of the project, with Steel Empire co-director Yoshinori Satake at the helm overseeing the process. The title received positive reception from reviewers; criticism was geared towards its short length and low difficulty, with some regarding it as a clone of Gradius and R-Type but praise was given to the atmospheric and colorful visual presentation, use of environmental stage gimmicks, ability to customize the ship, sound design and gameplay.

== Gameplay ==
Gameplay screenshot.

Over Horizon is a horizontal-scrolling shooter game similar to Gradius and R-Type, where players control a space fighter craft through six stages, each with their own environmental gimmick and boss that must be defeated to progress further and face Kassandra, a dangerous alien creature that the anti-Federation organization Gamma is using as a superweapon to take rule of Alpharos for themselves. The main ship is capable of shooting forward or backward by pressing the A or B buttons, while some enemies carry items to increase its firepower, such as weapons and satellite pods. There are three weapons and each one is powered-up by collecting their respective letter three times. The pods fire their own projectiles and block incoming enemy fire, while their positions can be changed by holding A and B.

Unique to the game is the ability to customize the ship via "Edit Mode"; Players can spend up to five points into the ship's weaponry to produce modifications such as exploding lasers or homing bombs. Players can also modify both formations of the satellite pods for offensive or defensive positionings before starting the game. Getting hit by enemy fire or colliding against solid stage obstacles results with losing a live, as well as a penalty of decreasing the ship's firepower.

== Development and release ==
Over Horizon was conceived by Hot-B during a proposal with Pixel to re-use their engine from Dungeon Kid, a first person role-playing game with an "Edit Mode" reminiscent of RPG Maker, to make a "create your own shoot 'em up" game. However, Steel Empire co-director Yoshinori Satake claimed there were talks from Pixel about reworking its design into a standard shooter title before overseeing the design process after Hot-B decided to take over the project from Pixel to fix it. Both Satake and producer Yoshihiro Tonomura headed its development. Yoshiki "Miya:Yoshi" Miyagi acted as game and graphic designer alongside "Nekomata. K" and "O. Yasuhisa" while Hideki "Kuwa" Kuwamura, Jun "Metal Jun" Saitō and Junichi "J. Osa" Osajima served as co-programmers. The soundtrack was composed by Masaharu Iwata, who previously scored the music of Dungeon Kid.

Hot-B implemented stages where players could shoot forward and backward, changed parameters of the player shots and enhanced the graphics to give stages and enemies more visual appeal, as Satake stated the stages and graphics Pixel had made were not complete and very weak. Sataka also stated that the environmental stage gimmicks were already introduced by Pixel but not well-implemented, prompting Hot-B to make adjustments and re-use the work done by the former team, designing each stage to give their own gimmicks life while using them as much as the staff could. Sataka claimed that the gimmicks were difficult to integrate due to the Nintendo Entertainment System's hardware, stating that the programming skills of Hot-B "were not that great." Iwata also stated he could not express parts of a song due to technical limitations.

Sataka wanted to avoid players giving up and improve their skills after dying in the game by introducing the ability to change positioning of satellite pods and weapon experimentation, due to his dislike of difficult shoot 'em up titles such as Gradius II and R-Type. Sakata also made the ship capable of firing forward and backward due to his dislike of enemies appearing behind in shooter games and to avoid frustration from players. Sataka stated that the team were able to turn the project into a good shooter game despite the struggle he faced in the final phase of development. Over Horizon was first published in Japan by Hot-B on April 26, 1991 and later in Germany by Takara in 1992. A sequel was planned by Hot-B and Sataka wanted to leave a hint with a startling scene, creating a surviving remnant of Kassandra for the ending who says the line "You have won this battle, but I'll be back", which was translated by a skilled member with English from Japanese due to Sataka's lack of English skills.

== Reception ==
Reception

Review scores
Publication	Score
Famitsu	5/10, 6/10, 7/10, 5/10
Total!	2+
Video Games (DE)	76%
Hippon Super!	7/10
HonestGamers	4.5/5
Megablast	78%

Over Horizon was met with positive reception from critics. Video Games' Ingo Zaborowski commended the atmospheric visual presentation, music and other game elements but criticized its short length and easy difficulty. Megablast's Richard Löwenstein praised the unusual boss fights, varied level design, colorful graphical presentation and audio. Total!'s Klaus-D. Hartwig compared the game with both Gradius and R-Type, giving very positive remarks to the gameplay, graphics, sound and long-term fun factor.

HonestGamers' Rob Hamilton called Over Horizon a clone of Gradius and R-Type but commended the ability to customize the ship and stage gimmicks. Hardcore Gaming 101's Michael Plasket regarded it as one of the best 8-bit shoot 'em up titles on the Nintendo Entertainment System, praising the use of environmental hazards, polished gameplay mechanics, graphics and music but lamented the lack of a North American release.
