= Battle Pingpong =

1990 video game

- Developer(s): Quest
- Publisher(s): Quest
- Platform(s): Game Boy
- Release: JP: August 31, 1990
- Genre(s): Sports game
- Mode(s): Single-player

BATTLE PINGPONG (バトルピンポン) is a Japanese table tennis video game developed and published by Quest for the Game Boy exclusively in Japan. It was released in Japan on August 31, 1990 and never saw a release in another territory, although the game was going to be published by Sammy in America. The game allows the player to either compete in a tournament or vs. mode against 8 nations.
