= Final Fantasy Tactics Advance =

2003 video game

- North American box art
- Developer: Square
- Publishers: JP: Square; WW: Nintendo
- Director: Yuichi Murasawa
- Producer: Yasumi Matsuno
- Designer: Satomi Hongo
- Programmer: Shinichi Fujisawa
- Artists: Hideo Minaba; Ryoma Itō
- Writers: Kyoko Kitahara; Shutaro Yokoyama; Yasumi Matsuno
- Composers: Hitoshi Sakimoto; Kaori Ohkoshi; Ayako Saso; Nobuo Uematsu
- Series: Final Fantasy
- Platform: Game Boy Advance
- Release: JP: February 14, 2003; NA: September 8, 2003; AU: September 19, 2003; EU: October 24, 2003
- Genre: Tactical role-playing
- Modes: Single-player, multiplayer

Final Fantasy Tactics Advance (Note: Japanese: ファイナルファンタジータクティクスアドバンス, Hepburn: Fainaru Fantajī Takutikusu Adobansu) is a 2003 tactical role-playing game developed by Square for the Game Boy Advance, and published by Square in Japan and Nintendo internationally. A successor to Final Fantasy Tactics (1997), the story follows the trials of some children from the town of St. Ivalice after a magical book transforms their home into a fantasy realm of the same name. Gameplay has player teams fighting in turn-based combat on a grid, with units using a themed Job system. A new feature is a "Law" system, which places random limitations on player action during battles.

Yasumi Matsuno, creator of the original Tactics, had wanted to make a follow-up game but was unable to due to other projects. Production began on Tactics Advance in March 2002, and was handled by former Quest Corporation staff who worked on Tactics Ogre: The Knight of Lodis (2001). Several staff returned from Tactics including Matsuno as producer, Hideo Minaba as art director, and Hitoshi Sakimoto as lead composer. The team's goal was a refinement of the gameplay of Tactics that could be played in short sessions. The story, art design and music were tailored for a younger audience.

Tactics Advance was confirmed shortly after production began in 2002, and formally announced later that year. Its announcement formed part of Square's public reconciliation with Nintendo after a long-standing estrangement. Its Japanese release was one of the last from Square before its merger with Enix. Upon release the game sold over one million copies worldwide, and met with positive reviews. Journalists praised the combat design and graphics, but some faulted the story's lighter tone and several felt the menu design was cluttered. Elements of Tactics Advance were incorporated into Final Fantasy XII (2006), and a sequel Tactics A2: Grimoire of the Rift was released in 2008 for the Nintendo DS.

== Gameplay ==
A screenshot of an early battle in Final Fantasy Tactics Advance

Final Fantasy Tactics Advance is a tactical role-playing game in which players take on the role of Marche Radiuju, a young boy transported to the world of Ivalice who searches for a way home; to fulfil his quest, he takes command of a clan fighting for prominence in Ivalice. Game progress is driven by missions, which are split into different types; standard combat missions often tied to the story, non-combat missions players sent a unit on, and "Encounter" missions that revolve around fights with rival clans. The player can bring special items on mission to influence what happens, with some missions requiring specific items. As the player progresses, they can use items rewarded after some missions to create new areas of the Ivalice map, with some types of positioning rewarding players with more items.

Combat uses a turn-based tactical system, with player units placed on a grid-based map viewed from an overhead isometric perspective with maps having different terrain types; each unit has a turn in which to move and act. Units have health points (HP) and magic points (MP), with MP starting at zero and regenerating with each turn. MP are used to perform magic abilities, with more powerful spells costing more MP. When a Unit's HP is depleted, they are knocked out. Units can move and attack within a set range, wait to skip their turn, or perform a non-combat action. Attacks come with a percentage chance, showing how likely it is to connect. There are also status ailments which can impact units, such as blinding them to lower accuracy or silencing magic users. Characters earn experience points from performing actions in combat, which allows them to be strengthened.

Units have access to a character class-based Job system, with elements such as unit statistics, armour combatability and the types of abilities available tied to certain jobs. Unit jobs have specialized abilities, such as Thieves being able to steal from other units and Ninjas having high speed. Some jobs are better suited for or exclusive to one of the five races populating Ivalice. Units can learn abilities by equipping weapons and equipment associated with an ability that are won in combat or purchased at in-game shops. After wearing it for a number of battles, the unit learns the ability permanently. Mastered abilities are also retained after changing job roles, and more jobs can be unlocked as characters gain experience and abilities.

In most battles, combat is overseen by a neutral Judge who handles the Law system, which imposes restrictions on available actions; these can include prohibiting the use of certain spells, item usage, or attacks with particular weapons. Depending on the type and frequently of violating the Law, the Judge uses a yellow card to inflict a punishment such as lowering hit chance, while a red card causes the unit to be taken from the battlefield. Following the Laws reward and killing enemy units reward Judge Points (JP), which are used to perform special attacks or summon totemas, the game's version of summoned monsters. In areas controlled by Judges, defeated units are revived after combat is finished. After a point in the game, players can use special Law cards to both set their own Laws and erase existing Laws. Some areas of the world are not overseen by the Judges, which removes their associated mechanics.

The game features a multiplayer option where two players can connect their Game Boy Advance (GBA) systems via link cable. When linked, players can exchange units and items, and either collaborate on missions or fight each other. Powerful items can be unlocked for players by engaging in the multiplayer. Completing missions rewards players with in-game currency (gil), which is used to buy equipment, items, and new missions. If all player units are defeated in combat in some missions, or Marche is imprisoned for violating a Law, the game ends. In most cases, losing does not end the game, but the mission is considered a failure.

== Synopsis ==
=== Setting and characters ===
The game is split between two locations; St. Ivalice, a modern countryside town, and a fantasy realm called "Ivalice" which is reached through a magical book that transforms the town and its people based on the dreams of the book's readers. The book, called the Gran Grimoire, is an ancient tome created in a land called Kiltia during an era of magic. The dream Ivalice includes multiple other races including Moogles, the Viera, and the Nu Mou. In the context of Tactics Advance, the world of Ivalice is said to be based on a game played by one of the characters. Later comments have distinguished the dream world Ivalice of Tactics Advance from the true land of Ivalice.

The main characters are four children from St. Ivalice who have different personal issues. Marche Radiuju is a recent arrival after his parents' divorce, and often has his needs neglected over his brother Doned, who suffers from chronic illness; Mewt Randell is a bullied introvert whose mother recently died and whose father Cid has turned to drink to cope; and Ritz Malheur is an outspoken but self-conscious classmate of Marche. In the world of Ivalice, the characters take on different roles, such as Mewt becoming a prince ruling with his living mother, and Cid becoming a respected Judge. Marche's first ally upon reaching Ivalice is Montblanc, a Moogle clan leader.

=== Plot ===
After running into school bullies, Marche brings Mewt and Ritz to his house to play with Doned. Mewt has found an old book he wishes to show them; the book is the Gran Grimoire, which transforms St. Ivalice into the fantasy realm of Ivalice. Marche wakes from sleep to find the town transformed and his friends living new and for them more satisfying lives. Mewt has become the respected Prince of Ivalice with his formerly-drunk father as Judgemaster and his once-dead mother as queen, Ritz's white hair has naturally become the red she had dyed it to fit in, and Doned is fully healthy and able to walk. However Marche sees that Mewt's rule and clan wars that have erupted between factions is causing suffering for the transformed townsfolk. Marche begins his search for a way home, aided by Montblanc and his clan, but his quest brings him into conflict with his friends who are attached to the dream world and resent his efforts. His attempts to reach Mewt are blocked by both Cid, and the warrior Llednar Twem, later revealed to be the manifestation of Mewt's negative emotions.

To return St. Ivalice to normal, Marche breaks the magical crystals sustaining it, along the way overcoming the Judges' tyranny and reconciling with Doned. He also bests Ritz in combat, and convinces Cid to ally with him. With Cid's help Marche defeats Llednar Twem, but Mewt's mother continues to protect his fantasy; she is a manifestation of the Gran Grimoire's magic shaped by Mewt's longing for his mother. Marche defeats the Gran Grimoire, promising to support Mewt, which causes the dream world to vanish. Back in reality, the four have grown from their experience and are able to improve their lives; Cid finds a new job, Ritz lets her hair return to its natural white, Doned begins making friends, and Marche and Mewt stand up to the bullies.

In addition to the main plot, there are two side plots: the Redwing Arc and the Judge Arc. The Redwing Arc centers around the Redwings clan, a foreign crime ring, their subordinate clan Borzoi, and their smuggled foreign monsters. The other is the Judge Arc, unlockable after beating the main three hundred missions. This serves as an alternative ending where Marche never goes on his quest and stays in the dream world, overthrows several corrupt judges, and becomes Cid's successor.

== Development ==
Following the release of Final Fantasy Tactics (1997), Yasumi Matsuno knew there was expectation for a sequel, but he was unable to create one due to working on other projects including Vagrant Story (2000) and Square's PlayOnline service. He also wanted to stand apart from Tactics rather than being a straight sequel, and had created a proposal for it before working on Vagrant Story. During its early stages, the project was considered for the PlayStation 2. During this period, Square was mending relations with Nintendo, with whom there had been a long-standing estrangement following Square's decision to develop Final Fantasy VII on the rival PlayStation platform. Matsuno described this situation as a management issue, as many among the staff wanted to develop for Nintendo platforms. Also during this period, staff from Ogre Battle developer Quest Corporation was absorbed into Square; both Matsuno and Yuichi Murasawa, director of Tactics Ogre: The Knight of Lodis (2001) expressed an interest in working together. Tactics Advance was greenlit for the GBA due a coincidental combination of public demand, the reconciliation with Nintendo, and the joining of Quest staff to work on the project.

Production on Tactics Advance began in early 2002 at Square's Product Development Division 4, headed by Matsuno and made up of staff from both Quest and Matsuno's earlier projects. Matsuno acted as producer for the game, Murasawa as director, Satomi Hongo as lead designer, and Shinichi Fujisawa as lead programmer. In contrast to his earlier work, Matsuno was not deeply involved in development beyond the initial planning stages, leaving the rest of production to Murasawa's team. Production of the game last nine months including debugging, a tight schedule that Matsuno felt had left some aspects underdeveloped. Rather than being called Tactics 2 and treated as a traditional sequel, Matsuno felt it was an "advance" of the first game's mechanics. It was given the title Tactics Advance to be easily distinguished from its predecessor. Production ran parallel to Matsuno's work on Final Fantasy XII (2006), and after development finished the Tactics Advance team was merged with that of Final Fantasy XII.

Matsuno described the core gameplay of Tactics Advance as revolving around "quests and battles", with an emphasis on player freedom. He began designing Tactics Advance without a clear focus in mind beyond regrets around unfulfilled goals from Tactics, and while he defined some initial goals he told the team to do as they liked otherwise. To create a game players could potentially "play forever", a large amount of missions with varied objects was incorporated. New missions were being created up until the last week of production. According to Murasawa, the game was designed to be played in short sessions that could be stopped at short notice. The Law system was implemented to create a random element and prevent players from brute forcing progress through leveling, although Matsuno later felt it was poorly implemented and simply restricted the player without layering on benefits.

In contrast to his earlier story concepts which had a number of exterior influences, Matsuno created the story of Tactics Advance with "one core theme"; people carry real-world burdens entering a "warm and fuzzy" fantasy world. The initial story concept of a world entered through a magic book was present in Matsuno's original design draft. While there was a lighter tone than Tactics, Matsuno reused a plot point of friends driven to fight each other over conflicting ideals. Something he later regretted not incorporating was the subject of racial relations between Ivalice's peoples. The scenario was primarily written by Kyoko Kitahara, with Shutaro Yokoyama as supporting writer.

The art director was Hideo Minaba, who had worked with Matsuno on earlier projects. For Tactics Advance, Matsuno and Minaba agreed to take the art in a "different direction". The characters were designed by Ryoma Itō, who had previously worked on Final Fantasy IX (2000) and was a fan of Matsuno's work. As part of the appeal to a younger demographic, the characters were designed to have a "Shōnen manga feel". Some characters underwent redesigned during production, such as Mute's hair going from a bob cut to a "rock-style". Itō also heavily redesigned the Moogles for Tactics Advance with Matsuno's approval, which gave him a confidence boost in later projects. The summons' publicity designs were designed by Nao Ikeda, who had previously worked on Legend of Mana (1999). The game's graphical design focused on colour over scale, with Murasawa's team wanting a good atmosphere. The team had created a feature which would display greater color variety on more advanced variations of the GBA, although Matsuno felt the differences were not that great.

=== Music ===
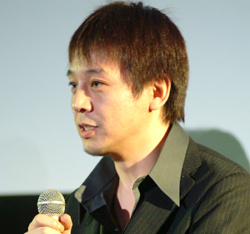
Hitoshi Sakimoto was sound producer and lead composer for Tactics Advance.

The music of Tactics Advance was primarily composed by Hitoshi Sakimoto, who had previously worked with Matsuno on Tactics and Vagrant Story, and the Ogre Battle series. Additional music was composed by Kaori Ohkoshi and Ayako Saso of SuperSweep. The main theme was composed by Final Fantasy veteran Nobuo Uematsu. Sakimoto was the sound producer, and arranged the tracks with Ohkoshi and Saso. Tactics Advance was among Sakimoto's first project after founding his music company Basiscape. Matsuno described the music direction as having a bright "pop" sound, having some of his favorite tracks from Sakimoto. Sakimoto commented that having previously focused on dark music, the score for Tactics Advance was "unusually bright". When converting the soundtrack into a MIDI format that would play on the GBA, Sakimoto drew on his previous experience working on the soundtrack for Knights of Lodis. Ohkoshi and Saso, both women, were brought on to add a different sound to the score.

Sakimoto attributed Uematsu's main theme as inspiring some of his work on the game, but Uematsu was dissatisfied with its quality. In an interview, Uematsu commented that when he handed in his composition, Sakimoto protested that he could not recreate its sounds within the game. Ohkoshi was excited about working with Sakimoto and Uematsu, but described the consequent pressure as "just terrible". Saso was originally just a supervisor for Ohkoshi, but ultimately was brought on board as a full composer. She was initially nervous, having never composed in Sakimoto's style, but she ultimately created her tracks quickly. She was given creative freedom on the score, and instructed not to emulate the original Tactics. Due to her background in brass band music, she described her tracks as having a brass band influence.

A two-disc soundtrack album was released on February 19, 2003, by DigiCube. The album contained the GBA music on the first disc, and the full orchestrated versions of tracks on the second disc. The album was reissued by Square Enix on March 24, 2006. An arrangement album, "white" melodies of Final Fantasy Tactics Advance, was released by Square on February 26, with selected tracks arranged for instruments including piano and acoustic guitar.

== Release ==
Matsuno confirmed the development of a Tactics for the GBA in March 2003, stating that the game was roughly 30% complete at that point with a planned 2002 release. By its showing at the 2002 Tokyo Game Show, its title had been officially announced. Tactics Advance published in Japan by Square on February 14, 2003, launching alongside a special white GBA console. Tactics Advance was one of the last games published by Square in Japan before its merger with Enix in 2003. It was reissued by Square Enix as part of its Ultimate Hits budget range on March 9, 2006.

Several pieces of merchandise were produced by Square to promote and commemorate the game. Square produced a radio drama titled Final Fantasy Tactics Advance Radio Edition which was broadcast between January 4 and March 26, 2003. The cast included Yuka Imai as Marche, Asami Sanada as Mute, and Yumi Kakazu as Ritz. The song "White Flower" by Japanese band Zone was licensed both for commercials and for the radio drama. DigiCube published the radio drama, which included CD-exclusive episodes, between February 19 and May 21, 2003.

Square entered a deal with Nintendo to publish Tactics Advance outside Japan alongside two other Nintendo-developed titles; Final Fantasy Crystal Chronicles and Sword of Mana. For its Western release, the team attempted to fix some of the gameplay issues raised by Japanese players. The localization was handled by Alexander O. Smith, who previously worked on Vagrant Story. It was published in North America on September 8, in Australia on September 19, and in Europe on October 24. The game was re-released through the Wii U Virtual Console on January 28, 2016 in the West and March 30 in Japan.

== Reception ==
Reception

Aggregate scores
Aggregator	Score
GameRankings	88% (66 reviews)
Metacritic	87/100

Review scores
Publication	Score
Computer and Video Games	8/10
Edge	7/10
Electronic Gaming Monthly	9/10
Eurogamer	9/10
Famitsu	34/40
Game Informer	9.5/10
GameSpot	8.2/10
IGN	9/10
Nintendo World Report	7.5/10
RPGFan	81%

During its first week on sale in Japan, Tactics Advance sold over 224,000 units, reaching second place in charts. By November 2003, the game had shipped over 1.5 million copies worldwide; 460,000 units were sold in Japan, 760,000 units in North America, and 330,000 units in Europe. It was noted as being very popular overseas. In a different estimate for the United States, the game sold 660,000 copies and earned $22 million by August 2006. During the period between January 2000 and August 2006, it was the 40th highest-selling game launched for portable consoles in that country.

The game met with positive reviews from gaming journalists; it earned aggregate scores of over 88% based on 66 reviews on GameRankings, and 87 points out of 100 based on Metacritic. At the 7th Annual Interactive Achievement Awards in 2004, the game won an award in the Handheld Game of the Year category, and was nominated for the Strategy Game of The Year Category at the 2003 NAVGTR Awards.

Japanese gaming magazine Famitsu focused on the gameplay, which was praised for both its depth and ease of understanding for new players. Rob Fahey of Eurogamer noted some changes from the original Tactics, but felt these were improvements and felt it would be counted as one of the best handheld titles in the future. Andy McNamara of Game Informer was extremely positive about the gameplay, finding it addictive and challenging to master. Greg Kasavin, writing for GameSpot, found the gameplay traditional yet engaging, and enjoyed how the Law system changed battles. Edge also enjoyed the combat system and praised the Law mechanic, but found battles too slow and easy in the early stages. Computer and Video Games was positive about the mission variety but felt it was unfriendly to a casual audience, and Robert Bogdanowicz of RPGFan praised the gameplay as its best feature while noting frustration he encountered with both the Law system and hit percentages. Craig Harris of IGN enjoyed the gameplay depth and tactical elements, but noted its high difficulty compared to the story's intended audience. Electronic Gaming Monthly lauded the gameplay structure and design, with the three reviewers all enjoying the added elements of Advance. Nintendo World Report's Jonathan Metts found the gameplay both solid and easy to understand for newcomers, but felt it had been oversimplified in places and faulted the job system's design. Confusing or unintuitive menu design was a recurring complaint.

Bogdanowicz thought the graphical and art design was better than the original Tactics, and called the score "classical in composition and very appropriate" with high-quality MIDI tracks. Electronic Gaming Monthly mentioned the graphical and music design as positives, and Harris summed up both the graphics and audio as "splendidly produced". McNamara praised the graphics for their retro style, and thought the soundtrack was one of the best on the system. Kasavin praised the character and sprite designs, but noted limited character animations and felt there were too few musical tracks.

Electronic Gaming Monthly was positive about the story compared to the more complex narrative of Tactics, with one reviewer calling it "simple and engaging". Harris described the story as simple to understand and similarly felt it was aimed at a younger audience than the original Tactics Kasavin noted few twists, and disliked the inability to skip story sections in more difficult fights. Edge summed up the narrative as "rather slight and uninvolving", while Fahey found it thin and spread out over too many missions, and Computer and Video Games summed it up as "kiddy". Bogdanowicz disliked the disconnect created by the game's premise of the characters being in a fictional world, an issue made worse by its focus on mission-based gameplay. Metts found the characters too poorly developed to carry the narrative, while McNamara negatively compared the story to The NeverEnding Story and felt the simple narrative was a poor fit with the challenging combat.

== Legacy ==
In an interview about the game, Matsuno said he was open to the creation of a sequel. A sequel for the Nintendo DS, Final Fantasy Tactics A2: Grimoire of the Rift, was announced in late 2007 and featured multiple staff from Tactics Advance. The sequel was released worldwide in 2007. While referencing the events of Tactics Advance, Tactics A2 was intended to take place in the real world Ivalice featured in Final Fantasy XII. Tactics A2 formed part of the Ivalice Alliance, a set of games developed by Square Enix using the world of Ivalice. Elements from Tactics Advance, including summons, races and the Judges, were also incorporated into the setting and story of Final Fantasy XII.
