= Ogre Battle 64 =

1999 video game

Ogre Battle 64: Person of Lordly Caliber
- North American box art
- Developer: Quest Corporation
- Publishers: JP: Nintendo; NA: Atlus USA
- Director: Tatsuya Azeyagi
- Producer: Makoto Tokugawa
- Designer: Koji Takino
- Programmer: Masaaki Kitagawa
- Artist: Toshiaki Kato
- Writer: Tomokazu Momota
- Composers: Hayato Matsuo; Masaharu Iwata; Hitoshi Sakimoto
- Series: Ogre Battle
- Platform: Nintendo 64
- Release: JP: July 14, 1999; NA: October 5, 2000
- Genres: Tactical role-playing, real-time strategy
- Mode: Single-player

Ogre Battle 64: Person of Lordly Caliber (Note: Ōga Batoru Rokujūyon: Person of Lordly Caliber (オウガバトル64 Person of Lordly Caliber) in Japanese.) is a real-time tactical role-playing game developed by Quest Corporation. The game was published for the Nintendo 64 by Nintendo in Japan and by Atlus USA in North America. Though conceptually similar to Ogre Battle: The March of the Black Queen, significant gameplay tweaks were implemented to change the game's overall flow. Ogre Battle 64 is the third game in the series, the first two being Ogre Battle: The March of the Black Queen, and Tactics Ogre. Gaiden has been released in Japan on Game Boy Advance and Neo Geo Pocket Color. Ogre Battle 64 was released in PAL regions for the first time via the Wii Virtual Console in 2010.

== Gameplay ==
=== Unit formations ===
Ogre Battle is a real-time strategy role-playing game. Magnus, the protagonist, commands a battalion of up to 50 troops. Members of the battalion are sectioned off into units, by the player. Each unit must contain a leader. Any character can be dubbed leader, minus most non-human entities, soldiers and basic classes like the Fighter or Amazon. Gorgons and Saturos are the main exceptions to this rule. Each unit, including the leader, has a maximum of five members. Units are used to battle enemy units, which follow the same structural formation.

=== Structure and objectives ===
The game is divided into several chapters, each chapter serving as a mission with specific objectives outlined by the battalion's adviser, Hugo. Although suggestions for how the battalions units may be mobilized are given, it is not required to follow Hugo's advice so long as the main objective is completed. Most objectives require capturing an enemy stronghold with any unit or defeating a particularly strong unit.

A battle taking place in the training room depicts a Princess and Lich combining their magical attacks to perform a stronger combined attack.

=== Battle ===
Much like other real time tactics games, Ogre Battle 64 has automatic combat between two outfits. However, what makes the gameplay unique is that, when two parties battle, the screen view switches to an isometric view of a pre-rendered battlefield, which is very reminiscent of typical RPG video game battles. Characters make their attacks in semi-real time, meaning multiple characters act at once. In the battle system, there is a vast array of attacks, critical hits, and parries during the combat situations. The unit is disbanded once each member dies. If at any point Magnus Gallant dies, a game over screen is shown and the game cycles back to the main menu.

=== Classes ===
One of the trademarks of the series is the class system. Each character belongs to a certain class, and the vast majority can be changed into different classes. The classes determine the type of attacks the character can use in battle, what equipment it can carry, as well as effects on the unit's statistics. Many classes are most efficient in certain positions of a unit. All classes are divided into three major groups: male, female, and non-human.

== Plot ==
The story follows Magnus Gallant, a recent graduate of the Ischka Military Academy, and fledgling captain in Palatinus' Southern region, Alba. As civil war erupts in the country, Magnus eventually decides to join the revolution with its leader, Frederick Raskin, first liberating the southern region with the Zenobians' aid, then Nirdam and uniting with them, then returning the Eastern Region of Capitrium to the Orthodox church, and finally marching on the capital of Latium. However, along the way, Magnus' battalion, the Blue Knights, finds its enemies escalating, from the puppet kingdom of Palatinus, to the might of the Holy Lodis Empire, to the Dark Hordes of the Netherworld.

There are three possible Endings determined by the player's Chaos Frame, and within those endings are slight scene variations depending on the characters who joined the player's army. All three possible endings have one thing in common: Frederick dies an untimely death. The Chaotic ending is an ending where Magnus gets expelled from the revolutionary army, because they consider him a "monster" who settles everything by force; realizing that his actions were for naught, he disappears and the people forget about the great general who once saved them, therefore ensuring Palatinus' destruction due to Barbarians. In "Neutral" ending, he is named "General Magnus Gallant, the guardian of Palatinus". The last one is Lawful, after Frederick dies an untimely death, the war against the tribes Of the East of Gallea and Zeteginia, who wanted to invade Palatinus right after Lodis weakened it, attack; Magnus is named: "Magnus Gallant, The Paladian King"; his rule becomes forever to be remembered and his son Aeneas Gallant takes the Throne, following his father's footsteps.

== Development ==
Following the release of Tactics Ogre in 1995, series creator Yasumi Matsuno began planning for a third Ogre game which would balance the "soft" concepts of Tactics Ogre with the "niche" style of Ogre Battle: The March of the Black Queen. He also wanted to steer series developer Quest Corporation into developing a more mainstream role-playing game. In the event, Matsuno left Quest for Square, going on to develop Final Fantasy Tactics as a spiritual successor to Tactics Ogre. Ogre Battle 64 was the first Ogre title developed by Quest after Matsuno and other staff left for Square. Production began sometime prior to 1997 for Nintendo 64 (N64), at which point it was known only as Ogre Battle Saga. During this stage, the developers were debating whether to release it as a standard cartridge, as a title for the disc-based 64DD, or both. While apparently planned for the 64DD, it later settled into being a standard cartridge-based game. It was credited as having the second-largest N64 cartridge at 320 megabits. It was also the first in the series to use 3D graphics. The characters were designed by Toshiaki Kato. The team created the character models to appear realistic, using 3D graphics to create them. This provided difficulties for the modeling team due to the hardware.

=== Music ===
The music was co-composed by Hayato Matsuo, Masaharu Iwata and Hitoshi Sakimoto, all returning from previous entries in the series. Matsuo had previously held a minor composing role for the original Ogre Battle, but for Ogre Battle 64 he was given a far larger role. For Sakimoto and Iwata, Ogre Battle 64 was their only work for the N64 platform. Sakimoto commented later that he found transferring his music into the N64 sound environment hard due to his lack of knowledge with the hardware. A soundtrack album was released by Datam Polystar in August 1999.

== Release ==
The game was announced in April 1997 as Ogre Battle 3, with a planned completion date of March 1998. Originally planned to release under that title, the game was officially retitled to Ogre Battle 64 in June 1999. Nintendo became the game's publisher, allowing for a greater marketing scope. It was released in Japan on July 14 the same year. The game was supported by multiple pieces of additional media, published through several different outlets. Six guidebooks were released, including various levels of explanation for levels and mechanics. Additional releases included an artbook featuring designs and illustrations by Kato, who comic anthologies, and a novelization by Hosai Tsuruoka with illustrations by Shirou Ohno.

In North America, the game was localized and published by Atlus USA, who had previously handled Ogre Battle ports for the PlayStation. When translating it, the team decided to keep some of the more mature elements such as swearing, wanting to both stay true to the Japanese original and aim the title at an older audience than typical for the platform. Localization began on the game in December 1999. Compared to the Japanese original, the Western version added the ability to save to a Controller Pak. It was released in North America on October 5, 2000. The Western version shipped in limited quantities, a fact attributed to lack of manufactured chips in the game's cartridge which made it playable. It was later re-released for the Wii through the Virtual Console market place in 2010 by Square Enix, who dissolved Quest Corporation after its predecessor Square bought the company; this marked the title's debut in PAL regions. It was later released through the Virtual Console for the Wii U in 2017.

== Reception ==
Reception

Aggregate score
Aggregator	Score
Metacritic	82/100

Review scores
Publication	Score
Electronic Gaming Monthly	8.33/10 (Note: Three critics of Electronic Gaming Monthly gave the game each a score of 7.5/10, 8.5/10, and 9/10.)
EP Daily	8.5/10
Famitsu	33/40
Game Informer	9/10
GameFan	(E.M.) 96% 91% (Note: In GameFan's viewpoint of the game, one critic gave it 90, and the rest gave it each a score of 92.)
GameSpot	9.1/10
IGN	(2010) 9/10 (2000) 8.8/10
N64 Magazine	87%
Nintendo Life	10/10
Nintendo Power	8.3/10
RPGamer	9/10
X-Play	3/5

The game received "favorable" reviews according to the review aggregation website Metacritic. In Japan, Famitsu gave it a score of 33 out of 40. Nintendo Power gave it a favorable review while the game was still in development. Vicious Sid of GamePro said, "Beneath Ogre Battle 64's intimidating interface and plodding pace lies a wealth of strategy: If you choose to enlist, be sure to pack plenty of patience." (Note: GamePro gave the game two 3.5/5 scores for graphics and fun factor, and two 3/5 scores for sound and control.)

The game won the award for "Best Strategy Game" at GameSpot's Best and Worst of 2000 Awards, and was nominated for the "Best Game No One Played" award, which went to Samba de Amigo. The staff noted that the game's sales had "fallen prey to [its] console of origin, the N64." The game was also nominated for the "Best Console Strategy Game" and "Gamers' Choice: N64" awards at The Electric Playground's Blister Awards 2000, both of which went to Front Mission 3 and Perfect Dark, respectively.

It was rated the 111th best game made on a Nintendo System in Nintendo Power's Top 200 Games list. Reviewing the Virtual Console re-release, IGN said that it "was (and still is) lordly indeed".

In 2023, Time Extension included the game on their "Best Nintendo 64 Games of All Time" list.
