= Tactics Ogre =

1995 video game

Tactics Ogre: Let Us Cling Together
- Super Famicom box art featuring lead characters Denim and Kachua Powell
- Developer: Quest Corporation (Note: Saturn port developed by Riverhillsoft. PlayStation port developed by Kuusou Kagaku.)
- Publishers: Super Famicom: JP: Quest Corporation; Sega Saturn: JP: Riverhillsoft; PlayStation: JP: Artdink; NA: Atlus USA
- Director: Yasumi Matsuno
- Designer: Yasumi Matsuno
- Artists: Hiroshi Minagawa; Akihiko Yoshida
- Writer: Yasumi Matsuno
- Composers: Hitoshi Sakimoto; Masaharu Iwata
- Series: Ogre Battle
- Platforms: Super Famicom; Sega Saturn; PlayStation
- Release: Super Famicom: JP: October 6, 1995; Sega Saturn: JP: December 13, 1996; PlayStation: JP: September 25, 1997; NA: May 6, 1998
- Genre: Tactical role-playing
- Mode: Single-player, multiplayer (Note: Super Famicom only)

Tactics Ogre: Let Us Cling Together (Note: Japanese: タクティクスオウガ, Hepburn: Takutikusu Ōga) is a 1995 tactical role-playing game developed and published by Quest Corporation for the Super Famicom. It was later ported to the Sega Saturn (1996) and the PlayStation (1997), the latter released in North America in 1998 by Atlus USA. The second entry in the Ogre Battle series, the story takes place in the war-torn kingdom of Valeria, where protagonist Denim Powell works in a local resistance force against occupying powers, ending up caught in the ethnic conflicts driving the war. Battles are turn-based, taking place on grid-based maps from an overhead perspective with a focus on positioning and using character class abilities.

Production lasted two and a half years, with Ogre Battle creator Yasumi Matsuno acting as director, writer and lead designer. The storyline was inspired by conflicts in Europe and Asia, based heavily in personal and political drama over the fantasy-themed narrative of Ogre Battle: The March of the Black Queen. The gameplay, inspired by the video game Solstice, uses a chess-inspired combat system in contrast with the real-time battles of its predecessor. Hiroshi Minagawa was art director, while the characters were designed by Akihiko Yoshida. The music, composed by Hitoshi Sakimoto and Masaharu Iwata, used the narrative as inspiration and remains fondly remembered by the composers.

The Super Famicom release sold 500,000 units in Japan and met with positive reviews. Later ports also met with strong sales and reviews, with many praising its gameplay and narrative. The PlayStation version was met with criticism for technical issues. It has since been remembered as one of the best in its genre. Matsuno left Quest Corporation after completing Tactics Ogre, joining Square (later Square Enix) and developing Final Fantasy Tactics (1997) and other titles set within its universe of Ivalice. Quest developed further titles in the series before being absorbed by Square in 2003. A remake of the same name for the PlayStation Portable was released in 2010.

== Gameplay ==
An early battle in Tactics Ogre: protagonist Denim Powell is prepared for an action during his turn.

Tactics Ogre: Let Us Cling Together is a tactical role-playing game in which players take on the role of Denim Powell (renamable by the player), a soldier caught in the middle of a war in the nation of Valeria. The player moves between nodes on a worldmap, triggering story events followed by either a single battle or sequences of battles. Beginning the game, the player is asked to input the lead character's name, birthday, and answer a series of questions determining their alignment and statistics. Each movement on the world map equates to a single in-game day, which alters weather conditions. Prior to battles, the player can equip their preferred units with chosen weapons, armor, items and accessories. Also included is a training mode, where the player controls both sides of a battle and can raise unit strength. This mode allows for two-person multiplayer in the Super Famicom release.

The game uses a turn-based battle system dubbed the Non-Alternate Turn System. Battles and all actions within take place on a small map viewed from an overhead diagonal perspective, with spaces and level geography appearing as a square grid structure. The player team has a maximum of ten units on the field, and a maximum of 30 in their army. The enemy team and allied characters are controlled by the game's artificial intelligence. A unit has a set range of movement, and an attack range dictated by their position on the map. Turn order is dictated by a unit's Wait Turn (WT) points, which fluctuate depending on how many and what type of action is taken, with a unit's weight and agility statistic impacting how many WT are gained each turn. When an enemy is defeated, a tarot card can randomly drop, able to bestow a temporary boost to a character. After a stage's victory condition is met, units can raise their experience level during battle. If Denim is killed, the game ends and must be restarted from an earlier save point.

Units have a variety of commands including moving, attacking with either melee or ranged weapons, performing a spell if they are capable of magic once their magic has charged enough during battle, using an item, or performing a character-specific special move. An ability unique to the lead character is "Persuade", which has a chance of recruiting enemy units in battle. The terrain and weather conditions impact how a unit can move and act in each battle. Unit behavior is also influenced by their alignment to the story path, and their associated elemental affinity which impacts unit compatibility and can enhance attacks or other actions. An important feature is character classes with dedicated abilities, which can be evolved into more powerful classes through use in battle and transferred to compatible characters.

A key element to progress is branching story paths, labelled as "Law", "Neutral" and "Chaos", built around the lead character either accepting or rejecting the commands of authority figures. Some characters will also live or die depending on these choices, represented through dialogue options during cutscenes. The narrative's branches occur in its first three chapters, with events coming back together for the final chapter's events before playing out an ending based on earlier decisions. Up to eight different ending variations can be unlocked. Character biographies and events both from cutscenes and beyond the revealed storyline are detailed in a separate menu named the Warren Report after one of the game's characters.

== Synopsis ==
Tactics Ogre takes place in Valeria, an archipelago united as a single kingdom under King Dolgare and worshipping a pantheon of six elemental gods, together with the Light Goddess Ishtar and the Chaos God Asmodeus. After Dolgare's apparent death with no direct heirs, the three primary ethnic groups of Valeria end up in a brief civil war, dividing into dedicated territories of varying sizes. The factions are Bacrum-Valeria, backed by the foreign nation of Lodis and ruled by its regent, Bishop Branta Mown; the Galgastan Kingdom led by Cardinal Barbatos; and the Walsta People led by Duke Ronway. After Galgastan gains the upper hand and declares itself ruler of Valeria, the neighbouring Walista are subjected to persecution and restricted to a small island.

The story opens with a small Walsta resistance group−Denim Powell, his sister Kachua, and his childhood friend Vice Bozek−attack a group of roaming Zenobian mercenaries, falsely believing their leader Lans Hamilton is the Black Knight Lans Tartare, a Lodis soldier who imprisoned Denim and Kachua's father Plancy in their childhood. The sympathetic Hamilton joins the group, bringing the old sage Warren, and Kachua vainly attempts to dissuade Denim from fighting. Denim's loyalty to the resistance is tested when Ronway orders the massacre of a town that refuses to join them, framing Galgastan for the crime. Whether Denim agrees or refuses the order, Vice disagrees and opposes him. If he rebels, Denim can later reconcile with Ronway or continue his own path. Following this, Vice either becomes a fugitive for disagreeing with Denim's return, or secretly allies with Bacrum for his own ends as he serves Ronway.

Eventually finding Plancy dying from a terminal illness, Plancy tells Denim he is of the Mown family, and Kachua is Dolgare's illegitimate daughter, giving her a direct claim to Valeria's throne. By this point, the revelations regarding their bloodlines and the constant danger for Denim strain his relationship with Kachua, leading her to briefly join Tartare's forces. If Denim does not comfort her, she commits suicide. Hamilton is captured and tortured by Tartare during this period, and while rescued Hamilton is left crippled and mentally traumatized. Galgastan is conquered and Barbatos dies either by suicide or execution. In all routes, Ronway's complicity in the massacre is revealed, leading to his assassination by his own people. Tartare's forces are defeated and Denim kills Branta Mown. Survivors of Tartare's Dark Knights use the stolen Zenobian sword Brunhild to break the seal on a portal leading to the realm of Asmodeus, attempting to use its power to repel Denim's forces but are instead killed.

It is revealed that Dolgare, overcome with despair over the death of his wife, made a pact with Asmodeus in an attempt to resurrect her and became an Ogre, one of humanity's ancient enemies. Dolgare attempts to return to reclaim Valeria, but Denim's forces defeat Dolgare, and Warren sacrifices himself to seal the portal. Depending on Denim's actions and Kachua's fate, either Kachua is crowned queen and unites the groups in a time of peace, or Denim is crowned king and either sees Valeria conquered by Lodis or is assassinated during his inaugural speech by a Galgastan. Vice's fate varies depending on the route, either surviving as Kachua's ally, dying after killing Ronway, or being executed by Bacrum-Valeria to protect Branta Mown. In all endings, Hamilton is left in Valeria, his surviving forces return to Zenobia with Brunhild, and Tartare escapes back to Lodis.

== Development ==
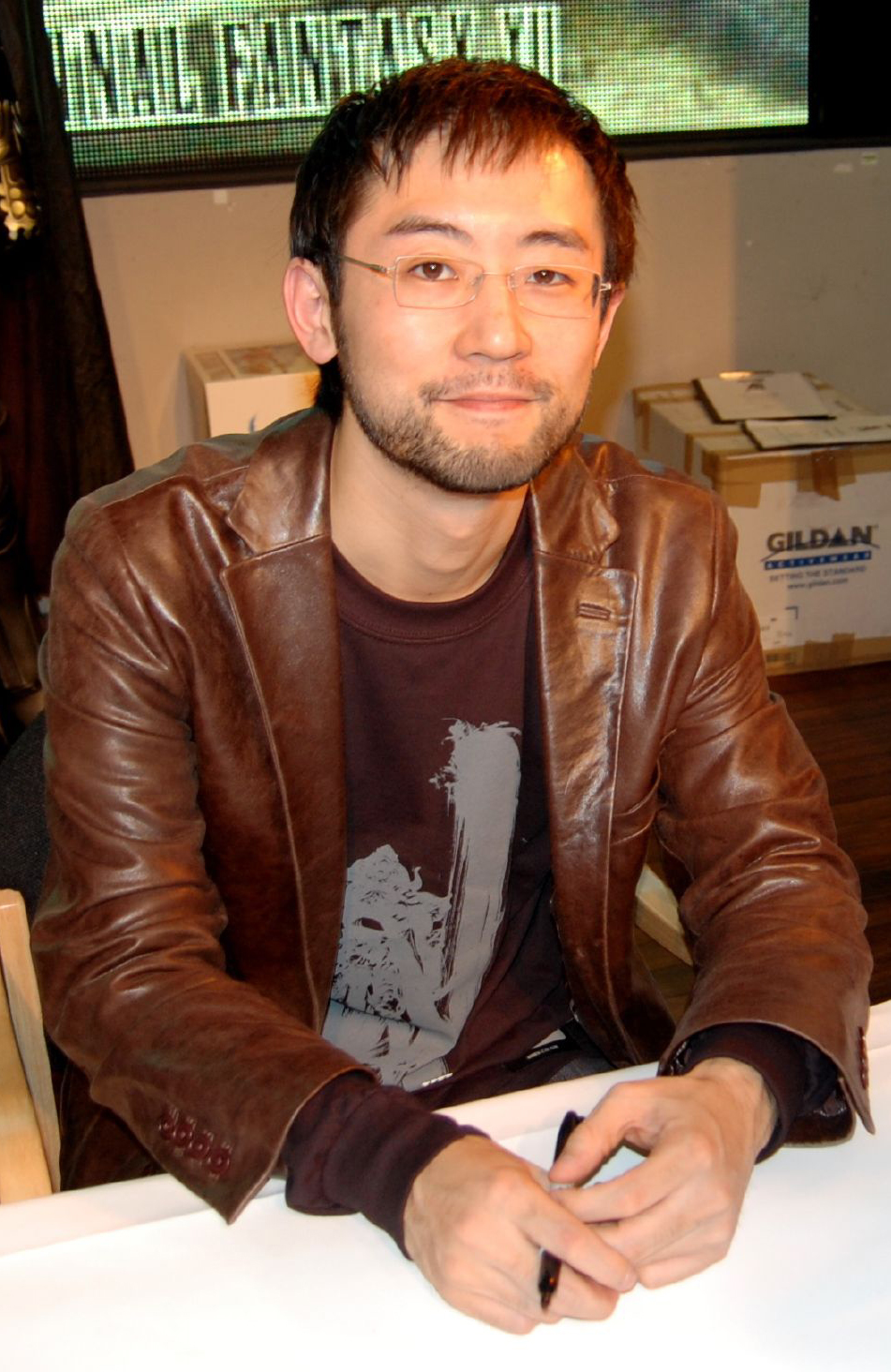
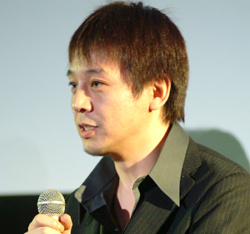
Original art director Hiroshi Minagawa and co-composer Hitoshi Sakimoto

The production of Tactics Ogre began at series developer and publisher Quest Corporation following the unexpected commercial success of Ogre Battle: The March of the Black Queen upon its 1993 release. The concept for Tactics Ogre was in place by 1992, though Matsuno's team had begun work on an untitled 3D action title which was abandoned when Quest Corporation requested a sequel to Ogre Battle. Matsuno created a multi-page detailed proposal for the game, with it taking a few months to get the project started at Quest. During this period, frustration with Quest's corporate structure had convinced Matsuno to eventually leave, but he decided to complete Tactics Ogre. Matsuno acted as the game's director, designer and writer. Production, including later delays, lasted two and a half years, involving a team of 15 to 16 people.

Hiroshi Minagawa acted as art director, creating the sprites, effects and user interface, while Akihiko Yoshida created the new character designs and level backgrounds along with character portraits. The latter job was very difficult due to color limitations on the console. Minagawa used the character sprites from Ogre Battle as a base for the character animations. Yoshida's more realistic character designs following the "Disney-like" designs of Ogre Battle were Matsuno's choice and emerged naturally during production. Matsuno wanted Yoshida to base the character faces on notable actors of the time, such as requesting Hamilton be based on Kevin Costner from The Untouchables. Yoshida ignored the instructions and created original designs, which Matsuno eventually accepted. Memory limitations were a constant issue, with walking and running animations being the only ones that could be on-screen at all times.

The switch from real-time to turn-based tactics was born from Matsuno's boredom with the first game's systems, a situation he compared to the differing paces and audiences for Alien and Aliens. He also wanted to fill a gap in the gaming landscape, creating a more approachable alternative to the notoriously difficult Fire Emblem series. The quarter-view perspective was directly inspired by Solstice, a game Minagawa enjoyed. Minagawa created a prototype design which he showed Matsuno, which formed the technical foundation for Tactics Ogre. The 3D-style levels were created using the custom-built Hermit technology, which could create large-scale levels based on positional data using a small amount of system memory. This allowed for more detailed graphic elements and for the time complex character animations. The battle system was inspired by chess. The magic system, which started with an empty magic meter that charged over time, was chosen to represent the great power of magic in the game's world.

=== Scenario ===
While Ogre Battle is a broad tale focused on a high fantasy battle between good and evil, Matsuno disliked the result. He wrote Tactics Ogre as a complex dark fantasy political tale focusing less on supernatural elements. He wanted people to be immersed in a foreign setting, basing the world's history on the Middle Ages and its population and society on the Roman Empire. To help with creating the background, Matsuno bought a book on world mythology. Inspired by the acceptance of involved storylines with the Final Fantasy series, Matsuno decided to create a "thoroughly written scenario". The initial pitch included the first chapter's narrative split, a conversation scene between Hamilton and Tartare, and Hamilton's fate. The scene between Hamilton and Tartare was written to convey the game's narrative themes of asking the meaning of justice and the reason people fight. Story, system and tutorial text totalled 300,000 characters, the memory for which had been set aside at the start of production with a large scenario in mind. The limitations of the Super Famicom led Matsuno to stage the narrative scenes like a theatrical play.

Tactics Ogre was designed as the seventh chapter of a larger narrative dubbed the "Ogre Battle Saga". While March of the Black Queen was the fifth chapter, Matsuno felt the gameplay of Tactics Ogre was a poor fit for the sixth chapter which would have directly continued the first game's narrative. Tactics Ogre runs parallel to the planned events of the sixth chapter. When it was decided to use the same world, characters from Ogre Battle such as Hamilton were incorporated into the narrative. The narrative was influenced by a number of real-life conflicts and war crimes, including territorial clashes in Syria, Azerbaijan and Armenia, the Yugoslav Wars, and the Rwandan genocide. The portrayal of ethnic conflict was fairly rare in Japanese games of the time. He was also inspired by major events of his life in Europe including the fall of the Berlin Wall, which were beginning to see regular broadcast on Japanese television. Rather than focusing only on ethnicity, Matsuno wrote the scenario to show how a conflict based on any differences between groups could be resolved. The implementation of multiple story routes was inspired by sound novels and gamebooks of the time.

The originally-planned protagonist was Hamilton, but after Matsuno created the character of Denim he focused the story around him. Denim's and Vice's names were respectively inspired by the material denim and the clothing brand Levi's, connecting to their origin in the world's lower social ranks. Following this logic, Kachua was not given a similar name, denoting her higher social status. Kachua's emotional instability and obsession with Denim was designed to contrast starkly against many fantasy heroines of the time, being compared to the later-common "tsundere" and "yandere" anime archetypes. Matsuno found idealized heroines boring due to overuse in media, wanting a more complex female lead. The Zenobian mercenaries were featured as they were early characters in Ogre Battle and players would empathise with them. During their inclusion, Matsuno made character adjustments, particularly to the character Canopus so he would appear as a big brother figure. While originally considering the Chaos route to be the canon series of events, he later summarized the endings as alternate coexisting timelines with no "correct" choice. Matsuno originally planned for more divergence in the story paths, but memory limitations meant these and other systems relating to unit loyalty were trimmed down. The variations in Denim's endings as Valeria's king were dictated by a hidden algorithm of how the different factions viewed Denim, a version of Ogre Battle's Chaos Frame. A cheat was included in the final game to show it through the Warren Report screen, but Matsuno lost the memo describing it and was only found by fans in 2014 through data mining.

=== Music ===
The music was composed by Hitoshi Sakimoto and Masaharu Iwata, who had previously worked on the first Ogre Battle. While the music of Ogre Battle had been lighter to match its narrative tone, the music for Tactics Ogre adopted a darker and more dramatic style. It was Sakimoto's first time creating orchestra-style music, learning to create equivalent sounds to a live orchestra using synthesizers. Tactics Ogre required a lot more work from Sakimoto than Ogre Battle, and he remembered putting all his heart into the compositions. Iwata described his work on the Ogre Battle series overall as a chance to change his musical style, citing Tactics Ogre as his favorite from the period.

A soundtrack album, featuring the original sound tracks on the first disc and in-game midi versions on the other two discs, was published by Datam Polystar on October 25, 1995. Tracks from Tactics Ogre were featured in the compilation album Ogre: Grand Repeat, published by Datam Polystar on October 25, 1996.

== Release ==
Tactics Ogre was released in Japan on October 6, 1995, 18 months after its initial announcement due to Matsuno wanting further polish in the character animations. The game's subtitle was inspired by the song of the same name by British rock band Queen. Minagawa later said that Matsuno's love of Queen and sadness at the death of Freddie Mercury led to numerous Queen references in the game. A demo was broadcast shortly before release on the Super Famicom's Satellaview peripheral. The game was also distributed through the Nintendo Power flash cartridge. It was compatible with ASCII Corporation's Turbo File, allowing save data transfer between systems. This version was re-released in Japan for Virtual Console on the Wii U on January 30, 2009. A Virtual Console version for New Nintendo 3DS was released on November 21, 2016.

It was ported to and published on the Sega Saturn by Riverhillsoft on December 13, 1996. The port was produced by Junji Shigematsu, who also supervised the porting of the original Ogre Battle to the platform. A priority was ensuring the game ran with minimal lag, which was a potential issue caused by the new CD storage. The Saturn release included voices for selected story sequences from a cast of 17 actors. Among them were Nozomu Sasaki (Denim), Yumi Tōma (Kachua) and Toshihiko Seki (Vice). The voice work was managed by Kazuhiko Inoue. Further unique music was also created for the different endings. Promotional items were made available on the game's release, such as metal figures of some key characters, as well as stickers for the Sega Saturn Backup Memory cartridge.

A PlayStation port was developed by Kuusou Kagaku and published by Artdink on September 25, 1997. Artdink reissued this version in Japan on December 2, 2000. Atlus USA published the PlayStation version for North America, riding on the commercial success of the PlayStation version of the original Ogre Battle. It was released in North America on May 6, 1998, dropping the original subtitle. The localization had been completed earlier than this, but Atlus chose to delay the release both to minimize competition with Final Fantasy Tactics, and to target players which Final Fantasy Tactics would introduce to the genre. The localization was impacted due to strict word limitations on the old hardware. This version was never released in Europe.

Multiple guidebooks were published in Japan for the various versions of Tactics Ogre. The Super Famicom guides were published by Aspect Co. and Shueisha, the Saturn guide by Shufunotomo, and the PlayStation guides were published by Zest. A downloadable art collection was published for Microsoft Windows and Macintosh by Quest parent company Bothtec. It was also adapted into a manga series published by Enix, a gag comic anthology published by Studio DNA, and a further anthology published by Enix with a cover illustration by Akihiro Yamada. The Super Famicom original was never released outside Japan, a fact attributed to the console's waning lifespan, its complexity in narrative and mechanics, and a lack of interest from Western players. A fan translation of the Super Famicom version, which transcribed the PlayStation script using a patch, was released by translation group Aeon Genesis on April 25, 2010. A fan translation of the Saturn version, which transcribed the PlayStation Portable script, was released on February 27, 2023.

== Reception ==
Reception

Aggregate score
Aggregator	Score
GameRankings	81% (PS)

Review scores
Publication	Score
Electronic Gaming Monthly	8/10, 9/10, 8/10, 8/10 (PS)
Famitsu	10/10, 8/10, 8/10, 8/10 (SFC); 8/10, 8/10, 7/10, 7/10 (SS); 8/10, 8/10, 7/10, 8/10 (PS)
Game Informer	8/10
GameSpot	7.9/10 (PS)
Joypad	7/10
Nintendo Life	10/10
RPGamer	5/5
RPGFan	88%
Sega Saturn Magazine (Japan)	7.66/10
Extreme PlayStation	78%

Award
Publication	Award
GameFan	Best Import Strategy Game

The Super Famicom release has sold over 500,000 copies in Japan. The Saturn version had sold over 70,000 units by February 1997, making it one of the console's best sellers at the time. During its release month, Western PlayStation release ranked ninth in EB Games PlayStation sales charts. Japanese gaming magazine Famitsu gave the game a Gold Award as part of its review. Review aggregate website GameRankings gave the PlayStation release a score of just over 81%, based on six reviews.

Famitsu praised the implementation of the narrative into the gameplay. Electronic Gaming Monthly praised the narrative as easy to follow compared to Final Fantasy Tactics and noted its multiple endings, while a retrospective review from Nintendo Life's Gonçalo Lopes praised the story as "anything but [cliche]". Bryan Boulette of RPGamer gave extensive praise to the narrative, citing it as one of the best stories within the medium. Jeremy Tan of RPGFan was also fairly positive about the narrative due to its tone and variation, and magazine PlayStation Extreme lauded it as better than that of Tactics.

The Famitsu reviewers praised the gameplay in general, but some faulted its high difficulty causing the training area to become almost mandatory. Electronic Gaming Monthly praised it as a solid and enjoyable gameplay experience. GamePro praised its gameplay as more diverse, comparing it to the more complex but narrower gameplay approach of Final Fantasy Tactics. Peter Bartholow of GameSpot lauded the gameplay as enjoyable, noting its long playtime for each of its story routes. Game Informer praised the amount of randomness in gameplay created by its narrative branches and questions during the opening section, in addition to the amount of options for unit customization. Lopes gave praise to the gameplay despite its age on the original hardware, Tan noted and enjoyed the simplicity of its unit customization compared to other titles including Tactics, while PlayStation Extreme enjoyed the gameplay's approach to combat despite noting a lack of pacing and some repetition later in the game. French magazine Joypad noted that the game would give players hours of enjoyment due its complexity and length.

The graphics were praised in general by both Famitsu and GamePro, though the latter faulted the sound effects for their minimal use. Lopes also noted the small usage of sound effects, but praised the graphics and art direction. These sentiments were echoed by Electronic Gaming Monthly and Tan, who additionally praised its musical score. Game Informer also noted a lack of graphical power compared to Tactics. Bartholow was fairly negative about the graphics, finding them dated compared to other titles on the platform. PlayStation Extreme was fairly mixed on the audio and graphics due to their age and origins on the Super Famicom. Joypad negatively noted the lack of extras and language options.

Both Nintendo Life and RPGamer gave different versions of the Super Famicom original perfect scores. Both Famitsu and Japanese publication Sega Saturn Magazine praised the Saturn version, noting the inclusion of voice acting. Famitsu's review of the PlayStation port praised it as a faithful adaptation of the Super Famicom original. The PlayStation version was faulted by Western reviewers for technical issues including frame rate drops, loading times and bugs.

The Super Famicom version was awarded Best Import Strategy Game of 1995 by gaming magazine GameFan. In March 2006, the Japanese Famitsu magazine readers voted on their 100 all-time favorite games, and Tactics Ogre was named number seven. In 2017, IGN placed Tactics Ogre as the 20th best RPG of all time, citing the mature themes, and multiple story paths and endings. In 2019, Famitsu conducted a poll of over 7000 readers to determine the best games of the Heisei era (1989–2019), with Tactics Ogre placing 15th. In a retrospective of tactical RPGs for the PlayStation, 1Up.com ranked Tactics Ogre as one of the best available at the time. A later retrospective of the game from the same website praised it as an innovator in the genre for its narrative and gameplay, but let down by a lack of accessibility outside Japan aside from the PlayStation port. Kat Bailey of USgamer praised its innovations for the time and mature storytelling compared to many other titles both in the genre and in general gaming. Kimberley Wallace of Game Informer ranked it among the top ten best tactical RPGs, referencing its PlayStation Portable remake as an accessible means of enjoying the game.

== Legacy ==
Matsuno left Quest in 1995 once Tactics Ogre was completed, eventually joining Square (later Square Enix). Together with a number of Tactics Ogre staff members who followed him, he developed Final Fantasy Tactics (1997) for the PlayStation. Final Fantasy Tactics proved a success, and Matsuno went on to create multiple titles set within its fictional universe of Ivalice including Vagrant Story (2000) and Final Fantasy XII (2007). The latter would be his final project for Square Enix, as he departed the company in 2005 citing ill health, though he would return in later years to collaborate with Square Enix on a freelance basis. Banri Oda, a lead scenario writer for Final Fantasy XIV, cited Tactics Ogre as a direct influence on his storytelling for the expansion Shadowbringers.

While he left Quest after completing Tactics Ogre, Matsuno had been planning a third Ogre Battle title which would blend gameplay elements from the first Ogre Battle and Tactics Ogre into a mainstream experience. Quest continued production of the Ogre Battle series until 2003, when they were absorbed by Square following the completion and release of Tactics Ogre: The Knight of Lodis, a spin-off prequel to Tactics Ogre, going on to develop titles in the Final Fantasy Tactics subseries. Minagawa would reassemble most of the original staff, including Matsuno, for a PlayStation Portable remake of Tactics Ogre, released in 2010 in Japan and 2011 in the West. Released under its original title in the West and with the subtitle Wheel of Fortune in Japan, it received an expanded narrative, redesigned gameplay, artistic changes, graphical upgrades, and a new localization. A new update of the game was released on November 11, 2022, Tactics Ogre Reborn. Reborn was based on the PSP version, but with further changes and adjustments to graphics and mechanics. It was made available for PC, PlayStation 4 & 5, and Nintendo Switch.
