= Ogre Battle: The March of the Black Queen =

1993 video game

- Developer: Quest Corporation (Note: Saturn port developed by Riverhillsoft.)
- Publishers: Quest Corporation: Super NES; JP: Quest Corporation; NA: Enix America Sega Saturn; JP: Riverhillsoft PlayStation; JP: Artdink; NA: Atlus USA Mobile; JP: Square Enix
- Director: Yasumi Matsuno
- Producer: Makoto Tokugawa
- Designer: Yasumi Matsuno
- Artists: Akihiko Yoshida; Hiroshi Minagawa
- Writer: Yasumi Matsuno
- Composers: Masaharu Iwata; Hitoshi Sakimoto; Hayato Matsuo
- Series: Ogre Battle
- Platforms: Super NES; Sega Saturn; PlayStation; Mobile
- Release: March 12, 1993: SNES; JP: March 12, 1993; NA: May 1995 PlayStation; JP: September 27, 1996; NA: August 11, 1997 Sega Saturn; JP: November 1, 1996 iMode; JP: September 1, 2010 EZweb; JP: May 12, 2011
- Genres: Tactical role-playing; real-time strategy
- Mode: Single-player

Ogre Battle: The March of the Black Queen (Note: Japanese: 伝説のオウガバトル, Hepburn: Densetsu no Ōga Batoru; lit. Legend of Ogre Battle) is a 1993 real-time tactical role-playing game developed by Quest Corporation. Originally published for Super NES by Quest in Japan and by Enix America in North America. It is the first installment of the Ogre Battle series. It was directed by Yasumi Matsuno, and designed by Matsuno with Akihiko Yoshida. The story of Ogre Battle focuses on a band of rebels as they lead a revolution against a corrupt reigning Empire, ruled by an evil Empress.

Ogre Battle was ported to the Sega Saturn and PlayStation, with enhancements made to the original gameplay. It was later released for Virtual Console, and mobile phones. A successor, Tactics Ogre, was released in 1995 for the Super NES.

== Gameplay ==

Top: Moving across the stage map.
Bottom: A battle scene taking place.
(SNES version)

Ogre Battle: The March of the Black Queen begins in the outskirts of the Zeteginean Empire, (Note: Terms vary between the SNES English localization and the PSX localization, as well as terms used for Ogre Battle characters and places in various other games of the Ogre Battle series. As examples, Endora's nation is the Zeteginean Empire in the SNES localization and the Xytegenian Empire in some later games; the rival country is called the Rodisti in the SNES version but the Holy Lodis (or Lodissian) Empire in other games; the Opinion Leader is named by the player in Ogre Battle but called Destin Faroda in Ogre Battle 64; Warren Moon is later translated as Warren Omon; and so on.) 24 years after the founding of the empire through conquest. The main character is leading a revolution against this empire, which has turned to evil through the use of black magic by the mage Rashidi. The main character's name and gender is chosen by the player, and called the "Opinion Leader" in the instruction manual.

The game begins with the seer Warren using tarot cards to ask a series of questions to determine the player's suitability as leader of the revolution. There are several questions out of a fixed set which are randomly asked, each of which is associated with one of the 22 Major Arcana cards of divinatory tarot. The player's answers to these questions determine the Opinion Leader's abilities and starting units.

Ogre Battle mixes movement elements of a real-time tactics game with the character development and combat of a role-playing game. The game consists of a series of battles in which the player deploys units to fight against enemies and liberate occupied towns and temples. On the world map, the player can manage their characters, change their class, equip equipment, and choose the next stage to proceed to. Picking an already completed stage will not respawn the main enemies, although neutral monsters may still be there. The player is free to organize multiple squads of five fighters or fewer, with some large characters such as dragons or griffons counting as two for the purpose of squad size.

Time passes on the tactical map, alternating between day and night. Time of day has several effects; for example, vampires and werewolves only function during the evening, with the former appearing in coffins during the day, and the latter appearing as normal men. Deploying a squad costs a small amount of money, which must be paid again as maintenance every time a day passes. Towns and temples on the map can be liberated by units, and retaken by Zeteginea if left undefended. Upon liberation, a random tarot card is drawn, which can have a variety of effects. Liberated towns also provide income when a day passes. Some towns have shops where money can be spent on consumable items and equipment. Also, some towns and temples are hidden and do not display on the initial map; only moving a unit over the area will reveal it, as well as hidden caches of treasure.

Each stage has a boss; defeating the boss completes the mission. Both during and after the stage, towns and temples can be visited to gain information or items. There are 25 main stages in the game, with some variation possible in how the stages are played. There are also four hidden stages accessible through the main game with an additional stage as an easter egg. The game can be completed without finishing all the stages. There are 13 different endings to the main game, depending on the conduct of the player during the course of the game.

=== Battle ===
Each stage has a number of enemy units that attempt to re-capture the player's towns and temples. If two units move close to each other, a battle ensues. During a battle, the view shifts to a close-up view of the two combatant units. Characters alternate taking actions with the battle ending after one round of combat (many units can attack multiple times per round). The unit that caused the most damage is the victor and forces the other unit to retreat.

During a battle, a player does not directly control their unit, but selects a tactic for the unit to follow (Best, Strong, Weak, Leader), which the characters follow when choosing whom to attack. The player can also use stored tarot cards, which can cause damage or have a special effect. The Lovers card will cause all affected enemies to fight for the player; the Moon card will change the formation of the enemy unit, causing them to attack differently; the Fool card will remove all enemies but the leader from battle. The player also has the option of retreating from any encounter.

=== Alignment ===
The game uses a moral alignment system that affects both gameplay and the branching storyline. There is both a reputation score for the revolution as a whole as well as alignment scores for individual characters. Reputation is affected by several factors, such as the moral alignments of the troops used to liberate a city; allowing liberated cities to be reclaimed by Zeteginean forces; making popular or unpopular choices; and other decisions. The revolution's overall reputation score is one of the largest elements affecting the ending received, both directly and indirectly, as certain characters will only join a very high or very low reputation Opinion Leader.

The alignment statistic for each character indicates how lawful (good) or chaotic (evil) they are, on a scale from 0 to 100. When characters with high alignment liberate towns, it will raise the player's reputation (although a high charisma is also recommended). Characters with high alignment will be weak against dark attacks but strong against light attacks. They will fight better in the day and worse at night. Alignment can be raised by defeating enemies whose level is higher than the player's, and defeating low-alignment enemies such as ghosts. Alignment will drop when a character defeats high alignment enemies, such as clerics and angels, or characters of a lower level. To keep a character's alignment is high, it is important not to exceed the level of the foes they are sent against. Thus, it is important for players who want to keep a high alignment to keep the fights "fair". Drawing tarot cards can also raise and lower the alignment statistic a little.

Low alignment characters are considered more "evil". Consequently, they fight better at night and are weak against light attacks. Liberating towns with these types of characters will lower the player's reputation (especially if they possess a low charisma statistic). A player whose alignment is relatively high will not necessarily be penalized for employing units of low-alignment soldiers; rather, a mix of high- and low-alignment fighters results in the most potent fighting force. Provided the player keeps low- and high-alignment characters in their own separate units, and only liberates towns with high-alignment units, they can still see the best ending. Conversely, one who wishes to drop their alignment can continually capture towns with a few high-level, low-alignment units. For example, one can employ a few decidedly low-alignment units to slaughter enemy units, reserving high-alignment units for liberation purposes only.

=== Classes ===
Ogre Battle includes a class system for its characters that determine their statistics and abilities. There are several different classes available in Ogre Battle, but any given character is limited to a subset of class changes depending on their race. For instance, human characters can either be male (fighter) or female (amazon). There are also dragons, wyrms, pumpkins, angels, giants, hellhounds, octopuses, hawk men, demons, griffins, mermaids, golems and undead class trees. Gaining levels from experience points allows characters to access later upgraded classes in a class tree. There are also often alignment and charisma requirements in addition to level requirements. In addition, some classes also require the use of a special item. Finally, the two human class trees are unique in that they have the most branches in their tree and characters can be demoted to move along a different path. Potential recruits include knights, ninjas, wizards, angels, griffins, witches, and others.

Apart from statistic increases at level-up, a character's class also determines how the character moves and fights. Each character has a terrain type where they move fastest and fight the best (some classes also get additional attacks), with flying characters able to move quickly over all terrain. In addition, each class has a set of attacks characters can perform, ranging from physical attacks targeting one opponent to magical attacks targeting a whole unit.

== Plot ==
Twenty-five years prior to the beginning of the game, five separate kingdoms ruled the continent of Zetegenia. A war broke out, and Endora, the ruler of the Northern Highlands, conquered the other four kingdoms with the aid of the Sage Rashidi and his dark magic in but a year. Rashidi also betrayed his former friend King Gran of Zenobia (one of the other four kingdoms) and arranged his death. Endora became Empress of the new Zetegenian Empire, but under Rashidi's influence her rule became harsh and cruel. During her reign, a resistance organization called the Liberation Army forms from the remnants of the Knights of Zenobia, and seeks to free the continent from her rule.

At the beginning of the game, the protagonist, whose name, gender, and other characteristics are chosen by the player, takes command of the Liberation Army. Throughout the course of the game, the protagonist is joined by various other characters, such as Lans, a knight who served the king of Zenobia until the king's death; Warren, a wizard with the ability to divine the future; Tristan, the rightful prince of Zenobia; and many others. As the game proceeds, the Liberation Army eventually frees much of the continent and eventually invades the Highlands. Empress Endora, her son Prince Gares, and Rashidi are slain. Before Rashidi dies, he uses his blood to release Diablo, the king of the Underworld who was sealed away after the first great Ogre Battle. The protagonist and their army manage to seal Diablo away again before he can become too powerful.

There are multiple outcomes to the story depending on various factors such as the protagonist's alignment, their reputation, which characters they choose to recruit, and completing certain sidequests. In "bad" endings, the country they build is as evil as Endora's empire or even worse; "good" endings tend to involve either the protagonist becoming a just ruler, or putting Prince Tristan on the throne.

== Development ==
Ogre Battle was created by Yasumi Matsuno, who joined developer Quest Corporation in 1989; the company at the time had two development teams, one working on an action game at the time, and Matsuno ended up leading design for the second team. He began development on Ogre Battle in the summer of 1991. Wanting to make his mark in the company, he pitched a real-time tactical game, as these were uncommon in the Japanese gaming market at the time. Matsuno acted as the game's director and designer. The producer was Quest CEO Makoto Tokugawa. The less conventional gameplay approach was also meant to compete against Dragon Quest and Final Fantasy, which dominated the RPG market. Matsuno had never played a tactical game before this, but on staff recommendations played Nobunaga's Ambition to get a feel for the genre. Matsuno grew frustrated with the corporate structure of Quest during production on the game as it underwent restructuring and he had to take on the sole burden of reorganizing his team.

Matsuno created Ogre Battle as the fifth chapter in a seven-chapter "Ogre Battle Saga". His design for the world had been with him since before joining Quest, and he added to it during his work on other titles before pitching Ogre Battle. The story was written as a high fantasy battle between good and evil, a decision Matsuno regretted as he felt the major roles of gods and demons made the setting too unrealistic for his liking. The central character names were recycled by Matsuno from the names he gave a party in the game Master of Monsters, which he had enjoyed playing. A challenge faced by the team was creating a 3D-like display on the limited SNES hardware. The angled perspective on battles was to contrast against the common first-person or overhead top-down views of other RPGs at the time. The graphics were handled by Hiroshi Minagawa and Akihiko Yoshida. Yoshida later described the game's character designs as "Disney-like". Ogre Battle was Yoshida's second title while working at Quest, having first done artwork for Musashi no Bōken. In addition to character art and sprite work, Yoshida also designed the cover art, a choice made to ensure high quality within budget.

=== Music ===
The music was co-composed by Masaharu Iwata, Hitoshi Sakimoto and Hayato Matsuo. It was Sakimoto's first attempt at orchestral music, as he had previously only done with in techno and electronic music. He simulated an orchestral using a Roland SC-55, using an instrument dictionary with accompanying sample CD Iwata bought to replicate the various sounds. His work on Ogre Battle informed much of his later compositional style. Matsuo described the whole experience of composing for the game as informative, as each composer informed the other's work.

A soundtrack album for the game was released in April 1993 by Datam Polystar. An arrange album was also released. A further compilation arrange album, featuring tracks from both Ogre Battle and its sequel, was released in October 1996.

== Releases ==
Ogre Battle was released in Japan by Quest on March 12, 1993. The game's title is derived from "Ogre Battle" and "The March of the Black Queen", two songs by the British rock band Queen, of which Matsuno was a fan. The SNES version was published by the American branch of Enix in May 1995. The localization was produced by Robert Jerauld, who worked on all of Enix America's releases. Jerauld remembered Ogre Battle as one of his favorite releases. There was no official European release. In 1998, an updated edition of the Super NES version was released by Quest as a download for the Nintendo Power Cartridge in Japan. The Super NES version was re-released in North America on the Wii's Virtual Console on March 2, 2009, for 800 Nintendo points ($8). It was also released as an import in the PAL regions on July 3. The SNES version was ported to mobile devices with additional downloading maps and released in Japan by Square Enix for FOMA on September 1, 2010, and for EZweb on May 12, 2011. This version included access to wallpapers and ringtones promoting the 2010 remake of Tactics Ogre.

A PlayStation port was developed by Quest and published by Artdink on September 27, 1996. This version was localized into English under the title Ogre Battle: Limited Edition by Atlus USA in July 1997. A regional 18 month exclusivity deal formed part of the agreement. This version features larger text boxes. It lacks the voice acting and graphical detail for the units that were included in the Sega Saturn game. It adds the ability to save at any point (the Super NES version only allows saving at the end of each chapter). The Japan-only Sega Saturn port was developed and published by Riverhillsoft on November 1, 1996. This version, in addition to graphical upgrades, incorporates limited voice acting. The port was produced by Junji Shigematsu. A priority was ensuring the game ran with minimal lag, which was a potential issue caused by the new CD storage.

== Reception ==
Reception

Aggregate score
Aggregator	Score		
Aggregator	PS	Saturn	SNES
GameRankings	76%		84%

Review scores
Publication	Score		
Publication	PS	Saturn	SNES
Electronic Gaming Monthly	30/40		8.5/10, 8/10, 7/10, 8/10
Eurogamer			9/10
Famitsu	32/40	7/10, 6/10, 8/10, 7/10	8/10, 8/10, 8/10, 9/10
Game Informer	6.5/10		6.75/10
GameFan			90/100, 94/100, 90/100
GameSpot	7.8/10		
IGN	6/10		9/10
Next Generation			4/5
Nintendo Life			9/10
RPGFan	91%		89%
Sega Saturn Magazine (JP)		7.33/10	
Joypad (FR)		4/5	

Originally planned to have a relatively small 200,000 copy print run, encouragement by Nintendo after a positive press showing had Matsuno persuading Quest to double that number. The game sold through all 400,000 copies shortly after release, turning it into a commercial success. The North American printing by Enix was limited, apparently just 25,000 units, selling out quickly and prompting several reorders. It consequently became a collector's item, with unboxed cartridges selling for over $150 each in 1997. The PlayStation version was a commercial success for Atlus in North America, prompting the localization of its sequel Tactics Ogre.

The game received generally positive reviews from critics. The four reviewers of Electronic Gaming Monthly gave the Super NES version a rave review, applauding the graphics, music, combination of genres, hidden items, and the feature which defines the player character based on answers to the questions at the beginning, remarking that this creates "a different adventure each time". GamePro's Scary Larry gave it a mixed review, commenting that the game is "unique", but that the gameplay consists largely of tedious war simulation management, offering no direct control over the combat. He also criticized the overly small battle view. A reviewer for Next Generation commented that the graphics are simplistic and unimpressive but clear and easy to follow, the music is excellent, the interface is accessible, "and above all, the game play poses a serious strategic challenge".

A review in Nintendo Power complimented for having a lot of depth and having good replay value while saying it has an unusual game design and a slow learning curve.

Johnny Ballgame of GamePro gave the PlayStation version a positive review, commenting that "the gameplay and story line are identical" to the Super NES version but the audio has been remastered with "a movie-like musical score". He concluded that, with "13 endings, engrossing gameplay, and a wizard's bag full of secrets, Ogre Battle is a must-buy for RPG fans, whether or not you played the 16-bit version". Electronic Gaming Monthly commented that the PlayStation version is a "demanding strategy game loaded with secrets".

Ogre Battle was listed as the #180 best game made on a Nintendo System in a "Top 200 Games" list published by Nintendo Power. In 2018, Complex named Ogre Battle number 34 on their "The Best Super Nintendo Games of All Time". IGN ranked the game 41st in its Top 100 SNES Games.
