= Musashi no Bōken =

1990 video game

- Cover art
- Developer(s): Quest Corporation
- Publisher(s): Sigma Ent. Inc.
- Composer(s): Masaharu Iwata
- Platform(s): Family Computer
- Release: JP: December 22, 1990
- Genre(s): Role-playing
- Mode(s): Single-player

Musashi no Bōken (ムサシの冒険, lit. "Adventures of Musashi") is a role-playing video game for the Family Computer produced by Sigma Ent. Inc., and released in Japan on December 22, 1990.

The game is inspired by the legendary Japanese figure Miyamoto Musashi and is an RPG in the vein of Dragon Quest. The player only controls Musashi, son of Miyamoto Musashi, although a computer-controlled partner assists in battle.

There is a fan translation patch available for this game which allows it to be played in English.

== See also ==
- Miyamoto Musashi in fiction
