= Quest Corporation =

Video game company

- Native name: 株式会社クエスト
- Romanized name: Kabushiki gaisha Kuesuto
- Type: Division
- Industry: Video games
- Founded: July 1988
- Defunct: April 1, 2003
- Fate: Dissolved into Square Enix
- Headquarters: Tokyo, Japan
- Key people: Yasumi Matsuno; Hiroshi Minagawa; Akihiko Yoshida
- Products: Ogre Battle series
- Parent: Square (2002)
- Subsidiaries: Bothtec Inc. (1990 – 1997)

Quest Corporation (株式会社クエスト, Kabushiki gaisha Kuesuto) was a Japanese video game company founded in 1988. Quest is best known for its critically acclaimed tactical role-playing game series Ogre Battle.

In 1990, Quest was merged with the company Bothtec, the latter focusing on the development of personal computer software. Bothtec was best known for the 1986 action-adventure video game Relics, and the licensed games based on the Legend of the Galactic Heroes series. The companies were separated in 1997; as an independent company Bothtec Inc. remained a development partner of Quest and continued operation until being dissolved in 2009.

In 1995, key members Yasumi Matsuno, Hiroshi Minagawa, and Akihiko Yoshida left Quest to join Square, where they developed Final Fantasy Tactics and Vagrant Story, and have worked on Final Fantasy XII as part of Square Enix. In 2002, Quest was purchased by Square; the acquisition reunited some of Quest's developers with their former colleagues. These former Quest staff continued to work on the Final Fantasy Tactics sequels Final Fantasy Tactics Advance and Final Fantasy Tactics A2, while the Ogre series creator Yasumi Matsuno left the company in 2005. Matsuno later reunited with his former team to write and design for the 2010 remake of Tactics Ogre on a freelance basis.

== List of games ==
Year	Title	Platform(s)
1988	Daisenryaku	Nintendo Entertainment System
1989	Maharaja	Nintendo Entertainment System
1990	Conquest of the Crystal Palace	Nintendo Entertainment System
1990	Dungeon Kid	Nintendo Entertainment System
1990	Musashi no Bouken	Nintendo Entertainment System
1990	Battle Ping Pong	Game Boy
1990	Musashi no Bōken	Game Boy
1991	Legend: Ashita e no Tsubasa	Game Boy
1991	Magical Chase	TurboGrafx-16
1993	Ogre Battle: The March of the Black Queen	Super Nintendo Entertainment System
1994	Philip & Marlowe in Bloomland (Note: Released as Taiyou no Tenshi Marlow: Ohanabatake wa Dai-Panic, the English name comes from an unreleased 1991 prototype.)	Game Boy
1995	Tactics Ogre	Super Nintendo Entertainment System
1998	Puyo Puyo 2	Classic Mac OS
1999	Ogre Battle 64	Nintendo 64
2002	Tactics Ogre: The Knight of Lodis	Game Boy Advance

== See also ==
- Atlus USA
- Square Co.
