= Ogre Battle =

Video game series

- The Ogre Battle logo used in Ogre Battle 64
- Genres: Tactical role-playing, real-time strategy
- Developers: Quest; Dual Corporation; SNK; Square Enix
- Publishers: JP: Quest Artdink Riverhillsoft SNK; WW: Enix America Atlus USA Nintendo Square Enix
- Creator: Yasumi Matsuno
- Platforms: EZweb, Game Boy Advance, iMode, Microsoft Windows, Neo Geo Pocket Color, Nintendo 64, Nintendo Switch, PlayStation, PlayStation 4, PlayStation 5, PlayStation Portable, Sega Saturn, Super NES
- First release: Ogre Battle: The March of the Black Queen; March 12, 1993
- Latest release: Tactics Ogre: Reborn; November 11, 2022

Ogre Battle (Note: Japanese: オウガバトル, Hepburn: Ōga Batoru) is a series of five tactical role-playing and real-time strategy video games developed by Quest Corporation and is currently owned by Square Enix through Square's acquisition of Quest. There are five main games in the series, starting with the release of Ogre Battle: The March of the Black Queen in 1993.

== Overview ==
The first video game in the series, Ogre Battle: The March of the Black Queen, was released in 1993 for the Super Nintendo Entertainment System in Japan, and two years later in North America. The title was a real-time strategy role playing game, set in a medieval fantasy world. The second game in the series, Tactics Ogre: Let Us Cling Together, was released in 1995 in Japan. It was a turn-based tactical role-playing game making use of isometric graphics, and the title is largely considered to be "exceptionally influential" to the genre. Two subsequent games in the Ogre Battle series – Ogre Battle 64 and Ogre Battle Gaiden: Prince of Zenobia – follow the real-time strategy gameplay of the original title in the franchise, while Tactics Ogre: The Knight of Lodis follows the turn-based tactical role-playing gameplay elements of the second game in the series.

The Knight of Lodis, released in 2001, is the last original release in the franchise. In 2010, Tactics Ogre was remade for the PlayStation Portable as Tactics Ogre: Wheel of Fortune, but the characters, story and setting are identical to the 1995 release. The creator of the series, Yasumi Matsuno, directed the remake of the game. Matsuno was also responsible for another highly influential title, Final Fantasy Tactics, originally released in 1997. Though the title bears no relation to the Ogre Battle series, Final Fantasy Tactics is considered by some critics to be a spiritual successor to Tactics Ogre. As of 2016, the franchise mostly remains active through re-releases of the first two games for the Nintendo's Virtual Console service in Japan, North America and Europe.

Both "Ogre Battle" and "The March of the Black Queen" were titles to Queen songs from their 1974 album Queen II. In addition, "Let Us Cling Together" is the subtitle to their song "Teo Torriatte (Let Us Cling Together)" from 1976's A Day at the Races.

== Video games ==
=== Main series ===
Title	Original release date		
Title	Japan	North America	PAL region
Ogre Battle: The March of the Black Queen	March 12, 1993 (SFC)	May 1995 (SNES)	July 3, 2009 (Wii VC)
Notes: Real-time strategy game.; Released on the Super Famicom in 1993; this version was later released for Wii Virtual Console (2008) and Wii U Virtual Console (2013).; Also available on PlayStation (1996), Sega Saturn (1996), iMode (2010) and EZweb (2011).; Originally released in Japan under the title Legend of Ogre Battle (伝説のオウガバトル, Densetsu no Ōga Batoru).; The English subtitle translates to Japanese as Kuroki Joō no Kōshin (黒き女王の行進).
Tactics Ogre	October 6, 1995 (SFC)	May 1, 1998 (PS)	February 25, 2011 (PSP)
Notes: Tactical role-playing game.; Released on Super Famicom in 1995; this version was later released for Wii Virtual Console (2009), Wii U Virtual Console (2014) and New Nintendo 3DS Virtual Console (2016).; Also available on Sega Saturn (1996) and PlayStation (1997).; Sega Saturn version has voice acting in Japanese.; Originally released in Japan under the title Tactics Ogre (タクティクスオウガ, Takutikusu Ōga).; The English subtitle translates to Japanese as Te o Toriatte (手をとりあって).; Remade for the PlayStation Portable (PSP) in 2010; this remake, known under its original title in the West, was released in Japan using the subtitle Wheel of Fortune.; The remake was made available on Sony's PlayStation Network and can be downloaded and played both on PSP and PlayStation Vita.; A remaster of the PSP remake for the Nintendo Switch, PlayStation 4, PlayStation 5 and Microsoft Windows through the Steam digital download service was released in November 2022.; Physical releases of the remaster are available for the Nintendo Switch, Playstation 4 and Playstation 5.; A Collector's Edition was released in Japan containing one of the physical releases, an art book, the Tactics Ogre Official Script across 3 volumes, a soundtrack CD, a mat, a tarot card set and a pouch to store said cards.
Ogre Battle 64	July 14, 1999 (N64)	October 7, 2000 (N64)	March 26, 2010 (Wii VC)
Notes: Real-time strategy game.; Released on Nintendo 64 in 1999; this version was later released for Wii Virtual Console (2010) and Wii U Virtual Console (2017).; Originally released in Japan under the title Ogre Battle 64: Person of Lordly Caliber (オウガバトル64 パーソン・オブ・ロードリー・キャリバー, Ōga Batoru Rokujūyon: Pāson Obu Rōdorī Kyaribā).; The English subtitle translates to Japanese as Shidōshataru Utsuwa o Motsu Mono (指導者たる器を持つ者).

=== Side stories ===
Title	Original release date		
Title	Japan	North America	PAL region
Ogre Battle Gaiden: Prince of Zenobia	June 22, 2000 (NGPC)	—N/a	—N/a
Notes: Real-time strategy game.; Side story originally titled Prince no Shō: Let us walk on together, so as not lose our way (プリンスの章 Let us walk on together, so as not lose our way).; Released on Neo Geo Pocket Color in 2000.; Originally released in Japan under the title Legend of Ogre Battle Gaiden: Prince of Zenobia (伝説のオウガバトル外伝 ゼノビアの皇子, Densetsu no Ōga Batoru Gaiden: Zenobia no Ōji).; Only game in the series not to be released outside of Japan.
Tactics Ogre: The Knight of Lodis	June 21, 2001 (GBA)	May 7, 2002 (GBA)	—N/a
Notes: Tactical role-playing game.; Side story originally titled Ovis no Shō: Lodis no Kishi (オウィスの章 ローディスの騎士).; Released on Game Boy Advance in 2001.; Originally released in Japan under the title Tactics Ogre Gaiden (タクティクスオウガ外伝, Takutikusu Ōga Gaiden).

== Related software ==
A prerelease demo of Tactics Ogre: Let Us Cling Together was made available in early October 1995 for the Super Famicom add-on Satellaview. It consists of a battle in a preset map where the player has full control over two opposing teams, similar to the training mode in the full version of game.

In 1996, Bothtec Corporation released in Japan a CD-ROM containing a collection of images and artwork used in Tactics Ogre: Let Us Cling Together. The package is titled Tactics Ogre Complete Works and also includes icons, wallpapers, databases and a screen saver. It is available for Windows 95 and Mac OS.

== Reception ==
=== Sales ===
The series has sold over 2 million copies worldwide, placing it among the best-selling Japanese role-playing game franchises.

			Sales			
Title	Year	Console	Japan	USA	Total	Ref.
Ogre Battle: The March of the Black Queen	1993	SNES	400,000		400,000	
Tactics Ogre: Let Us Cling Together	1995	SFC	515,311	—N/a	515,311	
Ogre Battle: The March of the Black Queen - Limited Edition	1996	PS	59,817	47,655	107,472	
Ogre Battle: The March of the Black Queen	1996	SS	48,449	—N/a	48,449	
Tactics Ogre: Let Us Cling Together	1996	SS	78,993	—N/a	78,993	
Tactics Ogre: Let Us Cling Together	1997	PS	13,963	16,940	30,903	
Ogre Battle 64: Person of Lordly Caliber	1999	N64	200,770	76,529	277,299	
Ogre Battle Gaiden: Prince of Zenobia	2000	NGPC	14,283	—N/a	14,283	
Tactics Ogre: The Knight of Lodis	2001	GBA	282,838	100,390	383,228	
Tactics Ogre: Let Us Cling Together	2010	PSP	279,207	Unknown	279,207	
			Total sales: 2,135,145			

=== Critical reception ===
Among critics, the series was acclaimed both in Japan and North America. According to the review aggregator GameRankings, the SNES release of March of the Black Queen has an average aggregate rating of 84%, while the PlayStation port of Let Us Cling Together has an average of 81%. Ogre Battle 64 has an average of 86% and The Knight of Lodis 84%. In Japan, gaming magazine Weekly Famitsu scored the Super Famicom releases of March of the Black Queen and Let Us Cling Together 33/40 and 34/40, respectively. The magazine also provided high scores for Ogre Battle 64 (33/40) and The Knight of Lodis (34/40), while Prince of Zenobia received a slightly lower score, 28/40. The PSP remake of Let Us Cling Together is the most critically acclaimed release in the series, with an average of 88% at GameRankings and a score of 36/40 from Weekly Famitsu.

Critical reception from publications which reviewed five or more entries in the series
Release			Publication score					
Title	Year	Platform	EGM	Famitsu	GameInformer	GamePro	GameSpot	IGN
Ogre Battle: The March of the Black Queen	1993	SNES	31.5/40	33/40	6.75/10	15/20	–	9/10
Ogre Battle: The March of the Black Queen	1996	PS	30/40	32/40	6.5/10	16.5/20	7.8/10	6/10
Ogre Battle: The March of the Black Queen	1996	SS	–	28/40	–	–	–	–
Tactics Ogre: Let Us Cling Together	1995	SNES	–	34/40	–	–	–	–
Tactics Ogre: Let Us Cling Together	1996	SS	–	30/40	–	–	–	–
Tactics Ogre: Let Us Cling Together	1997	PS	33/40	31/40	8/10	4.5/5	7.9/10	–
Ogre Battle 64: Person of Lordly Caliber	1999	N64	25/30	33/40	9/10	13/20	9.1/10	8.8/10
Ogre Battle Gaiden: Prince of Zenobia	2000	NGPC	–	28/40	–	–	–	–
Tactics Ogre: The Knight of Lodis	2001	GBA	24.5/30	34/40	8/10	4.5/5	9.1/10	8.5/10
Tactics Ogre: Wheel of Fate	2010	PSP	7/10	36/40	9/10	4.5/5	9/10	8.5/10
Tactics Ogre: Reborn	2022	Microsoft Windows	–	–	–	–	–	–
Tactics Ogre: Reborn	2022	Nintendo Switch	–	–	–	–	8/10	–
Tactics Ogre: Reborn	2022	PlayStation 4	–	–	–	–	–	–
Tactics Ogre: Reborn	2022	PlayStation 5	–	–	–	–	–	–

== See also ==
- List of Square Enix video game franchises
- Final Fantasy Tactics
