= Bittersweet =

Bittersweet, bitter-sweet, or bitter sweet may refer to:

== Biology ==
- A vine in the nightshade family, Solanum dulcamara
- Some species of vines in the genus Celastrus, including American bittersweet (C. scandens) and Oriental bittersweet (C. orbiculatus)
- Glycymerididae family of shellfish, saltwater clams known as bittersweets or Dog cockles

== Film and television ==
- Bitter Sweet (1933 film), a 1933 film based on the Noël Coward operetta
- Bitter Sweet (1940 film), a 1940 film based on the Noël Coward operetta
- Bitter Sweet (2009 film), a 2009 Thai-American romantic comedy film
- Bittersweet (2020 film), a 2020 Indian drama film
- Bitter Sweet (TV series), a 2015 Taiwanese television series
- Sweetbitter (TV series), a 2018 American television series

== Music ==
- Bitter Sweet (operetta), a 1929 operetta in three acts written by Noël Coward
- Bitter:Sweet, an electronic indie rock band from Los Angeles
- The Bittersweets, an American music duo

=== Albums and EPs ===
- Bittersweet (Carmen McRae album), 1964
- Bittersweet, a 1972 album by Chairmen of the Board, or the title song
- Bitter Sweet (The Main Ingredient album), 1972
- Bitter Sweet (King album), 1985
- Bittersweet, a 1993 album by Clifford T. Ward
- BitterSweet, a 1993 album by Stephanie Nakasian
- Bitter Sweet (Kim Richey album), 1997
- Bittersweet, a 1998 album by Jenny Choi
- Bittersweet, a 2000 repackaging of the Wind on the Water by Crosby & Nash
- Bitter Sweet (Casiopea album), 2000
- Bittersweet (Blu Cantrell album), 2003
- Bittersweet, a 2009 album by David Rhodes
- Bittersweet (Mark Isham and Kate Ceberano album), 2009
- Bittersweet (Life On Planet 9 album), 2011
- Bittersweet (Kasey Chambers album), 2014
- Bitter-Sweet (Bryan Ferry album), 2018
- Bittersweet (Aaron West and the Roaring Twenties EP), 2016

=== Songs ===
- "Bittersweet" (Apocalyptica song), 2004
- "Bittersweet" (Arashi song), 2014
- "Bittersweet" (Big Head Todd and the Monsters song), 1993
- "Bittersweet" (Fantasia song), 2010
- "Bittersweet" (Fuel song), 1998
- "Bittersweet" (Gunna song), 2024
- "Bittersweet" (Hoodoo Gurus song), 1985
- "Bittersweet" (Madison Beer song), 2025
- "Bittersweet" (Miz song), 2006
- "Bittersweet" (Sophie Ellis-Bextor song), 2010
- "Bittersweet Poetry", formerly titled "Bittersweet", by Kanye West, 2007
- "Bitter-Sweet", a 2011 song by Alexandra Stan from the album Saxobeats
- "Bittersweet", a 2023 song by Conrad Sewell from the album Precious
- "Bittersweet", a song by Ellie Goulding from the 2012 soundtrack to Breaking Dawn – Part 2
- "Bitter Sweet", a song by Entwine from the 2004 album DiEversity
- "Bittersweet", a 2004 song by Falling Up from the album Crashings
- "Bittersweet", a song by Godflesh from the 1999 album Us and Them
- "Bittersweet, TN", a 2022 song by Kevin Morby from the album This Is a Photograph
- "Bittersweet", a 2021 song by Mingyu and Wonwoo of Seventeen
- "Bittersweet", the debut single by New Model Army from 1983
- "Bitter-Sweet", a 1974 song by Roxy Music from the album Country Life
- "Bittersweet", a song by S Club, a B-side of the 2003 double A-singles "Say Goodbye" and "Love Ain't Gonna Wait for You"
- "Bittersweet", a song by Tory Lanez from the 2020 album Daystar
- "Bittersweet", a song by Trenches from the 2008 album The Tide Will Swallow Us Whole
- "Bitter Sweet", a 2022 song by Twice from the album Celebrate
- "Bitter Sweet", a song by War of Ages from the 2006 album Pride of the Wicked
- "Bittersweet", a song by Within the Ruins from the 2017 album Halfway Human
- "Bittersweet", a song by Within Temptation that appears on the 2003 German edition of Mother Earth

== Others ==
- Bittersweet: How Sorrow and Longing Make Us Whole, a 2022 book by American author Susan Cain
- Backhanded compliment
- Bittersweet chocolate
- Bittersweet (color), a pinkish shade of the color orange (#FE6F5E)
- Bittersweet Creek, a stream in South Dakota
- Bittersweet (Franklin, Louisiana), listed on the NRHP in Louisiana
- Humblebrag
- Multiservice tactical brevity code - Bittersweet

== See also ==
- Sweet and Sour (disambiguation)
- Bitter Suite (disambiguation)
