= List of Romeo × Juliet episodes =

Cover art of the first Japanese DVD volume of Romeo × Juliet, featuring the title characters

Romeo × Juliet (ロミオ×ジュリエット, Romio to Jurietto) is a 24-episode anime television adaptation of Romeo and Juliet, a 16th-century tragedy originally written by William Shakespeare. The English playwright himself makes a cameo appearance in the series as a minor character. The series was produced jointly by Gonzo and SKY Perfect Well Think, with Fumitoshi Oizaki as the main director. It was first broadcast in Japan on Chubu-Nippon Broadcasting between April 4, 2007, and September 26, 2007. It was later broadcast by other Japanese television networks such as TBS, KBS Kyōto and SUN-TV. It was broadcast in Hungary by Animax and in Italy by Rai 4. The chief screenwriter for the series was Reiko Yoshida. The music was composed by Hitoshi Sakimoto and performed by Eminence Symphony Orchestra with Tomohiro Yoshida as sound director. The series used three pieces of theme music. The opening theme was "Inori (You Raise Me Up)" (祈り 〜You Raise Me Up〜) by Lena Park. "Cyclone" (サイクロン)) by 12012 was the ending theme for the first 14 episodes. "Good Bye, Yesterday" by Mizrock was the ending theme for episodes 15 to 23. "Inori: You Raise Me Up" by Lena Park was used as a special ending for episode 24. The anime is licensed in North America by Funimation. The complete series was released in two sections, with the first half of the series, the Romeo Collection being released June 23, 2009, and the second half of the series, the Juliet Collection being released August 11, 2009.

== Episode list ==
No.	Funimation title / Original Italian subtitle Original Japanese title	Original release date	English air date
1	"If They Did Not Meet" / "Destino"; Transliteration: "Futari ~Deawanakereba~" (Japanese: ふたり 〜出会わなければ〜)	April 4, 2007	April 28, 2010
In a bloody coup d'état against the rulers of Neo Verona, forces led by Montague enter the city's palace during nighttime and massacre members of the Capulet family. Juliet, the toddler daughter of Capulet, however, survives with the help of the palace's guards. She reappears fourteen years later masquerading as a young boy named Odin, who disguises himself as the heroic outlaw Red Whirlwind while fighting against the injustices of Montague's soldiers on the streets of Neo Verona. After fleeing a confrontation against the soldiers, Juliet finds herself cornered but is rescued by young noblemen Romeo and Benvolio. Juliet, whose Capulet heritage was hidden from her, expresses to her friend Cordelia the frustration of being required to dress as a boy in public. Cordelia encourages her to remain patient as everything will be revealed the following day on Juliet's sixteenth birthday. That evening, Juliet is invited by Emilia to join her at the palace's Rose Ball without having to dress as the opposite gender. At the ball, Juliet is revisited by a flashback of her as a toddler standing in the palace, and she encounters Romeo a second time in the palace gardens.
2	"The Promise: A Scent Remembered" / "Il Segreto"; Transliteration: "Yakusoku ~Omoide no Kaori~" (Japanese: 約束 〜思い出の香り〜)	April 11, 2007	April 28, 2010
During the chance encounter with Juliet, Romeo is called away by his father Montague, who announces to those present at the ball that Romeo will be betrothed to the noblewoman Hermione. Juliet, unaware of the announcement, is escorted home by her guardians and once again expresses to them her frustration of dressing as a boy. On the morning of her sixteenth birthday, Juliet once again masquerades as the Red Whirlwind and, with her sidekick Antonio, rescues several young women who were taken away as collaterals until their families are able to repay their loans. Their rescue is successful, but Juliet is cut by a sword during the confrontation. While she is treated for her injury, the doctor reveals to her the increasingly oppressive rule of Montague. Juliet encounters Romeo again later in the afternoon at a field of white irises. Before parting, the two promise to meet again the following day at the same location. Juliet is taken by her guardians after her birthday celebration that evening to the Capulet family cemetery. There, Juliet's Capulet heritage and full name is revealed, Juliet Fiammata Arst De Capulet, and former retainers of the family gather to swear allegiance to her.
3	"Love: Cruel Mischief" / "Attrazione"; Transliteration: "Koigokoro ~Zankoku na Itazura~" (Japanese: 恋心 〜残酷な悪戯〜)	April 18, 2007	May 5, 2010
When everything is revealed to Juliet she faints after remembering the night her family was killed. She is unable to visit Romeo, because of her revelation and because Cordelia made her promise not to hang out with a noble in fear of her safety. Romeo tries to meet Juliet once more with no success and travels the next day to a convent to visit his mother, Lady Portia. At the same time the doctor, Lancelot is under arrest on suspicion of being in cahoots with the Red Whirlwind. Juliet, disguised as the Red Whirlwind, goes to the prison cell where the doctor is being interrogated and breaks him out. They are cornered until Romeo shows up. He recognises the Red Whirlwind as Juliet by the scent of irises. He pretends to lose his footing whilst fighting her so he can take Juliet and the doctor with him into the river. Romeo takes them to a safe area, but that's when Juliet learns his full name, Romeo Candore De Montague.
4	"Bashfulness: Beaten by the Rain" / "Una Timida Fanciulla"; Transliteration: "Hajirai ~Ame ni Utarete~" (Japanese: 恥じらい 〜雨に打たれて〜)	April 25, 2007	May 5, 2010
Juliet is shocked with the fact that Romeo is the son of the man who slaughtered her family, and deserts the Capulets resolve for revenge. Meanwhile Romeo is being chastised by Benvolio for letting the Red Whirlwind go and also tells him that until he becomes the new ruler of Neo Verona, there is nothing he can do for the moment. Juliet, disguised as Odin ends up having another encounter with him whilst visiting her parents' grave. They fly across the city using Romeo's Dragon Steed, Cielo until it starts to rain and they take shelter in an island cottage on a lake outside the city, there Odin accidentally reveals her identity to Romeo.
5	"Whirlwind: Burning Resolve" / "Si Alza il Vento"; Transliteration: "Kaze ~Moyuru Kakugo~" (Japanese: 旋風 〜燃ゆる覚悟〜)	May 2, 2007	May 12, 2010
Romeo discovers, much to his surprise, that Odin is in fact his love Juliet and he takes her back to the city and Juliet decides to take up embroidery after accidentally burning Romeo's shirt at the cottage. Meanwhile, a manhunt for the Red Whirlwind engulfs Neo Verona, even going as far as rationing the food supplies under martial law and imprisoning suspected innocents into a cage to be burned alive. Dr. Lancelot discovers a priest of the church was the one who slipped information on his connection to the Red Whirlwind. The doctor later makes a decision as Juliet comes to terms with the Montague tyranny.
6	"Hope: Tomorrow Entrusted" / "Speranza"; Transliteration: "Kibō ~Takusareta Ashita~" (Japanese: 希望 〜託された明日〜)	May 9, 2007	May 12, 2010
After Lancelot saves the innocent people in the cage and sacrifices himself, the Red Whirlwind is believed to be dead, with only Romeo learning the truth that Juliet, still alive, is in fact the real Red Whirlwind. Benvolio's father Vittorio, the mayor of the city, is stripped of his aristocracy and exiled together with his family. After seeing the doctor's family as they are leaving into the countryside, Juliet and her companions learn from an informant that Lord Montague has ordered Vittorio and his family to be assassinated on the outskirts of the city. They arrive in time to protect them but just as Juliet is about to be killed by an assassin, a mysterious man on a Dragon Steed named Tybalt saves her.
7	"Warmth: Just for Now" / "Il Tocco delle Tue Mani"; Transliteration: "Nukumori ~Ima Dake wa~" (Japanese: ぬくもり 〜今だけは〜)	May 16, 2007	May 19, 2010
A mysterious man named Tybalt saves Juliet and her companions, who are fighting the assassins Montague has sent for Vittorio and his family, before vanishing. The next day is the Flower Festival, where flowers are given as a symbol of friendly or romantic affection. Romeo goes to the gravesite where he met Juliet's Odin identity looks at the gravestone to find it chiseled off. He then goes to visit his mother to ask for the name of Prince Capulet's daughter. At the same time Benvolio and his family go into hiding after they learn of Juliet's existence. Standing Hermione up for seeing the fireworks to honour their engagement, Romeo pursues Juliet through the city streets to give her an iris she dropped. After Romeo catches up with Juliet, they share their first romantic kiss.
8	"Naïveté: What Justice Is" / "La Via Più Facile"; Transliteration: "Amae ~Seigi to wa~" (Japanese: 甘え 〜正義とは〜)	May 23, 2007	May 19, 2010
Romeo, who has deduced Juliet's family name, tells her that he doesn't care about her family's name and that he loves her as Juliet. Juliet leaves, but gives him a handkerchief she made for him. Romeo is later punished for breaking his promise with Hermione, and informs her that he is seeing someone. He learns from Benvolio about his father's attempted murder on Vittorio and his family, who are now living in hiding. Tybalt, wanting to test Juliet's new resolve of destroying Montague, exposes the priest's corruption who sold Lancelot out to the Carabinieri to her; Juliet attempts to kill him for what he did, but she does not have the will to take another's life and bursts into tears after Tybalt kills the priest before he could do any more harm.
9	"Rise to Action: Hesitation Quelled" / "L'Incrocio"; Transliteration: "Kekki ~Tachikiru Mayoi~" (Japanese: 決起 〜断ち切る迷い〜)	May 30, 2007	May 26, 2010
Juliet and the others conspire to attack Montague, Curio and Francisco's advice is constantly ignored by a naive Juliet for believing the sooner Montague is dead, the sooner her suffering will end. But Camilo, Conrad's old friend betrays them by revealing their location and the Montague guards attack them. Francisco arranges for Juliet to escape with Tybalt, but not until Juliet goes into shock after accidentally stabbing a soldier. Meanwhile, Romeo finds leaves of the Escalus tree and inquires his father, who heads underground to meet with Ophelia, who later takes him to a place outside the city to find the dying roots of Escalus.
10	"Tears: To Have Met You" / "Lacrime"; Transliteration: "Namida ~Anata to Aete~" (Japanese: 泪 〜貴方と逢えて〜)	June 6, 2007	May 26, 2010
After Tybalt brings Juliet to safety, he leaves her alone after saying that she is not yet prepared to defeat Montague. Romeo makes a political speech to pardon the remaining loyalists of House Capulet to save Juliet, but to no avail. Blaming herself for being so naive and stubborn, Juliet goes out into the streets and collapses, but is saved by Lady Portia. Romeo then arrives after being summoned by her. She tells him of Montague's lies and true nature and allows him to visit Juliet. In a rendition of the balcony scene, he declares that he will throw away his name to stay and be with Juliet and they decide to elope.
11	"The Vows: The Blessing of the Morning Sun" / "II Giuramento"; Transliteration: "Chikai ~Asahi no Shukufuku~" (Japanese: 誓い 〜朝陽の祝福〜)	June 13, 2007	June 2, 2010
Romeo and Juliet leave Neo Verona and travel across the countryside. Whilst they are travelling through the forest Juliet tells of Cordelia and how she brushed Juliet's hair everyday and Cordelia considers it her treasure, which is the reason why Juliet never cut her hair short. Romeo tells the story about Cielo who was given to him as a birthday present after his mother left him and the Montague name and considers him to be like a little brother. They are attacked by poachers who are hunting a chestnut Dragon Steed, but they manage to force the men to retreat. Romeo decides to let Cielo go to be with the chestnut mare so they can both live in happiness with the ones they love. Romeo and Juliet arrive at a town where they get food and travel by an abandoned boat down the river. Juliet tells Romeo about her childhood dream of being a beautiful bride someday, but whilst Romeo doesn't have a dream he says that right now he is happy. They come upon a dilapidated church overrun by irises and take the vows of marriage before one another and the Goddess.
12	"Solace: To Stay This Way" / "Un Porto Sicuro"; Transliteration: "Ansoku ~Kono Mama de~" (Japanese: 安息 〜このままで〜)	June 20, 2007	June 2, 2010
The search for Romeo and Juliet continues, as they have their honeymoon in the abandoned village of Elbe. They stumble upon the Escalus tree, and find that its roots are dying. Several Capulet allies are scattered across the city, Cordelia, Benvolio and Antonio are starting to wonder where Juliet went off to, Conrad is being treated of his wounds by Lady Ariel, William's mother, Hermione is starting to show her dark side over Romeo loving someone else rather than her and Lord Montague goes to visit Portia to ask her about Romeo's whereabouts. Prince Montague's personal guards are sent to look for Romeo and Juliet. As Romeo and Juliet set out to stop the soldiers from destroying the nearby town, they find themselves greatly outnumbered. After both Romeo and Juliet show their true identities to the guards, Juliet is taken prisoner.
13	"Pulsation: Guided" / "Il Battito Vitale"; Transliteration: "Myakudō ~Michibikarete~" (Japanese: 脈動 〜導かれて〜)	June 27, 2007	June 9, 2010
Juliet is exposed as the leader of the Capulets and imprisoned. Lord Montague tells Romeo that Juliet was using him and that she will be executed, regardless of how he feels for her. Hermione visits Juliet in her cell and tells her to stay away from Romeo. She is just about to be executed, but is ultimately saved from imprisonment by Francisco, Curio, and Antonio. She is at first reluctant to go because she doesn't want anymore people to die for her. But Curio says that if she dies now, Lancelot's sacrifice would have been in vain. She agrees, but is pulled away to the Escalus Tree where Ophelia touches her and proclaims that Juliet will return to Escalus. Juliet finds herself outside the castle and is surrounded by soldiers until Romeo saves her. They decide to temporarily part ways, vowing to be together again.
14	"Solemn Responsibilities: In the Circle of These Arms" / "La Sfida"; Transliteration: "Jūseki ~Kono Ude no Naka de~" (Japanese: 重責 〜この腕の中で〜)	July 4, 2007	June 9, 2010
For betraying him, Romeo is banished from the keep by Lord Montague, and gives him authority over the Gradisca Mines. He is not allowed to return until the mine doubles its production, but Romeo vows their fight is far from over. He arrives to find the mines filled with small-time criminals, and decides to work in the mines himself to increase production. He befriends a sickly worker, Petruchio. Meanwhile Juliet and her allies move out of Neo Verona to travel to Mantua. Francisco tells Juliet to forget about Romeo, but she tells him that she can't because of the vows they made to one another. Over a small period of time, Petruchio gets sick, and dies. Romeo then learns the truth from Giovanni of how Petruchio was imprisoned. He also tells him the real difference between Nobles and Commoners, while Romeo cries over Petruchio's grave.
15	"The Self: The Way Forward" / "L'Alba dei Cambiamenti"; Transliteration: "Jiga ~Susumu Beku Michi~" (Japanese: 自我 〜進むべく道〜)	July 11, 2007	June 16, 2010
After Petruchio's death, Romeo is told by Giovanni to leave the mines before he is hurt. Juliet is resting, remembering the moments linked with the great tree of Neo Verona. At the same moment, an earthquake happens, causing a major cave-in at Gradisca Mines and injuring a majority of the workers. While the commanding officer of the mines orders the men to continue working, Romeo declares that all the labourers have done enough work to allow themselves to be free, declares the mines to be abandoned, and goes off to rescue some of the workers trapped by the cave-in. He rescues the remaining workers, and the other workers, who distrusted him for being a noble, now do trust him.
16	"One Person: So Dear" / "Lontano dall'Amato"; Transliteration: "Hitori ~Itoshikute~" (Japanese: ひとり 〜いとしくて〜)	July 18, 2007	June 16, 2010
With her patience and mental stability waning, Hermione runs away from home to try to see Romeo. Juliet meanwhile arrives in Mantua along with her companions and when she hears about the cave-in at Gradisca she is later found praying for Romeo's safety. Hermione is attacked by bandits and she grows darker by blaming Juliet for taking Romeo away from her. After taking a commoner's carriage to Mantua she unexpectedly runs into Juliet. Embittered and jealous, she attacks Juliet before fainting in exhaustion. The two girls reconcile their differences slightly when she awakens, and Hermione returns home afterwards, but she asks Juliet to keep her visit a secret as she doesn't want Romeo to know.
17	"Cruel Tyrant: Darkness, the Origin" / "Il Passato Sepolto"; Transliteration: "Bōkun ~Shikkoku no Innen~" (Japanese: 暴君 〜漆黒の因縁〜)	July 25, 2007	June 23, 2010
When they receive word that the miners will never return to Neo Verona, Romeo reassesses whether they will live in Elbe. Juliet hears news of Camilo in town and moves to engage him. Surprisingly, they meet Tybalt who has taken residence there. He then tells Juliet that he is a son of Montague after Montague seduced a Capulet woman to look for information after abandoning her. Titus blackmails Lord Montague to adopt his son, Mercutio or Montague's past will be revealed. Montague seemingly accepts the offer, but for betraying him Montague kills Titus in a sparring 'accident'. Tybalt reveals to Juliet that Montague was the son of a prostitute and his father was a Capulet noble. Since his father abandoned him and his mother died, he was adopted into the Montague family, poisoned the heir so he would become the next ruler of the family and killed the Capulets to fulfill his ambitions and to take revenge on the Capulets for what they did to him and his mother. Tybalt furiously promises to kill Montague for all that he has done, but Juliet says Tybalt is acting like Montague himself. Tybalt questions if Juliet hates him, but Juliet says she loves him, because of her love for his son.
18	"Aspirations: In Each of Their Hearts" / "Volontà"; Transliteration: "Kokorozashi ~Sorezore no Mune ni~" (Japanese: 志 〜それぞれの胸に〜)	August 1, 2007	June 23, 2010
Romeo works to create the village he has promised—at first with pitiful results. He later meets the Old Man that he and Juliet met when they encountered the dying roots of Escalus and he gives him some seeds that will withstand the most hostile environments and the village flourishes well. Meanwhile, Juliet begins rehearsing for a play William has composed for Neo Verona reenacting Juliet's tale. In playing a part where she kills the tyrant, she considers that although she doesn't hate him, for the future of Neo Verona and for the sake of the Capulet family she must kill Lord Montague. Juliet hears news of Romeo's village and, with Curio escorting her, they have a romantic and loving reunion.
19	"Succession: I Am None Other" / "Il Vento della Speranza"; Transliteration: "Keishō ~Ware Koso wa~" (Japanese: 継承 〜我こそは〜)	August 8, 2007	June 30, 2010
After spending some time together, the lovers go their separate ways again, with Juliet leaving for Mantua. William's play is underway and during the performance Juliet revives the Red Whirlwind ego. She plans to lead the citizens of Neo Verona not as the daughter of Capulet, but as the Red Whirlwind and that night Curio and Juliet discuss the story of how Juliet became the Red Whirlwind in the first place. As word spreads about the Red Whirlwind's revival, the people start to revolt. Rallying the townspeople for the Capulets' rebellion, Juliet attacks a major hidden fortress that housed the majority of the Montague's Pegasi troops and captured the town gate of Neo Verona. At the top of the gate, she rallies the populace against Montague's rule. After nearly getting shot in the head with an arrow, her true identity as a Capulet is revealed to the townspeople.
20	"Duty: Unwavering Step" / "Tenuti al Dovere"; Transliteration: "Shimei ~Yuruginaki Ippo~" (Japanese: 使命 〜揺るぎなき一歩〜)	August 29, 2007	June 30, 2010
Juliet, as the Red Whirlwind, rebels against Lord Montague to free the people of Neo Verona and successfully captures the outer city. Meanwhile the village Romeo is having trouble due to the soil; as the tree dies, the fertile land dies. Soon news about Juliet is sent to Romeo, and being supported by everyone in the village, Romeo rushes to meet Juliet. After meeting with Juliet, Romeo begs her to let him reason with his father once again. In the council of nobles, Montague proposes to burn the entire common grounds to flush the Capulets out. Only one was in favor, his adopted son Mercutio, while the others refused. He then proceeds to kill the chairman to persuade the others to accept out of fear. Romeo arrives to persuade his father to surrender, but, instead of surrendering, his father shows him Escalus, and he witnesses the tree dying as another earthquake strikes the land. Juliet then visits her parents' grave as she plans to rebuild Neo Verona alongside Romeo. At the grave, she meets with Ophelia, and here Juliet is shocked to discover that she is destined to save the tree by sacrificing herself to it.
21	"The Covenant: The Goddess's Embrace" / "Da Morire"; Transliteration: "Okite ~Megami no Hōyō~" (Japanese: 掟 〜女神の抱擁〜)	September 5, 2007	July 7, 2010
Juliet returns to the city, which is in ruins due to the earthquake created by Escalus. As the Capulets attempt to tend to the citizens, Mercutio begins Montague's scorch earth policy and presides to burn the city. When Romeo learns about what his now insane father what he has ordered and after threatening to kill Juliet, he disowns his father and proceeds to stop Mercutio who runs away crying. Romeo and Juliet meet together. Although Romeo promises after this is over they can be free to be together, Juliet is unable to tell him about her sacrifice. With the people on her side, Juliet begins the battle against Montague's defense. Before that, Juliet attends the wedding of Benvolio and Cordelia. She later gives Juliet the bouquet when she wishes for Romeo and Juliet's future. That night Juliet's wishes for their happy future and apologises to Romeo in her head for breaking their vow.
22	"Curse: Raging Fury" / "La Fine della Rivoluzione"; Transliteration: "Jubaku ~Aburu Gekijō~" (Japanese: 呪縛 〜荒ぶる激情〜)	September 12, 2007	July 7, 2010
Tybalt tells Juliet that he plans to kill Montague, though Juliet tells him not to he goes to do so anyway. Juliet tells him of her connection to Escalus, but Tybalt already knows it, since all the daughters of House Capulet have shared this fate. Romeo goes to his mother and says that he is going to kill Montague to put an end to his tyranny. As Juliet's forces attack the castle, Montague's remaining loyalists surrender to them. Prince Montague, who is waiting for Juliet and not willing to let go of the past, is confronted by Tybalt who tells him about his parentage and Juliet's condition. Romeo comes and attacks Montague as the Prince realises that his quest for power and revenge has been for nothing and curses Escalus for stealing it from him. Juliet faces off against Lord Montague, and convinces him to surrender. A mad-stricken Mercutio stabs from behind and kills Lord Montague with a poisoned blade.
23	"Seed Brought to Life: The Kiss of Death" / "Per il Mio Amore"; Transliteration: "Mebuki ~Shi no Kuchizuke~" (Japanese: 芽吹き 〜死の接吻〜)	September 19, 2007	July 14, 2010
While Juliet heads to Escalus, the whole city celebrates at the dawning of a new reign and the Capulet loyalists prepare for Juliet's coronation, after Romeo gives her the title of Princess of Neo Verona and self-exiles himself. Romeo tries to make amends to his departed father, but Tybalt comes and tells him of them being half brothers and that Juliet is sacrificing herself to save Neo Verona. Romeo then dashes to find Juliet before it is too late. As the land starts to die and fall apart, Romeo catches up with her, they fight and Romeo convinces her not to sacrifice herself without him. As Juliet's friends arrive, Ophelia activates the seed in Juliet causing her to sprout wings and forcibly begins to sacrifice her by giving her the kiss of death.
24	"Prayer: In the Same World as You" / "Un Nuovo Mondo"; Transliteration: "Inori ~Kimi no Iru Sekai~" (Japanese: 祈り 〜きみのいる世界〜)	September 26, 2007	July 14, 2010
Romeo goes to stop Ophelia from forcing an unconscious Juliet to being absorbed by Escalus. As the continent starts to come down Francisco, Curio and Tybalt come to assist Romeo, but they are easily knocked down. In a final attempt to save Juliet, Romeo uses the last of his strength to cry out her name and she wakes up. Romeo is fatally stabbed by Ophelia, whom Romeo kills. Juliet sees Romeo dying on the ground and decides to follow her destiny, sacrificing herself to save everyone in Neo Verona. Romeo is wrapped in Juliet's arms as she becomes Escalus so she doesn't break their vow. Afterwards, Neo Verona lands in the ocean between the tips of two continents. During the credits, a few years have passed and it is revealed that after Romeo and Juliet's death, Hermione is given hope on finding love again, Francisco and Vittorio are members of Neo Verona's new parliament, Curio owns a grocery store, Benvolio and Cordelia have a newborn baby, Conrad and Antonio are honouring Juliet's grave, a contented Tybalt takes Petruchio's younger siblings on a ride on Cielo, and William says that the joy of love is what Romeo and Juliet taught him as Romeo and Juliet's spirits are seen holding hands together.
