= Miz (singer) =

Miz (ミズ)
- Born: Mizuki Watanabe (渡辺みづき); March 6, 1981 (age 45)
- Origin: Kitami, Hokkaidō, Japan
- Genres: Rock, pop, J-pop
- Occupation: Singer
- Instrument: Vocals
- Years active: 1999-present
- Labels: Universal Music Japan, MCA Victor (1999-2002); Victor Entertainment, Reactive Songs Int., Scandinavian Songs (2004-2007); Nayutawave Records (2007-present)
- Website: http://mammoth-pro.com/artist/miz.html

Mizuki Watanabe (渡辺みづき, Watanabe Mizuki; born March 6, 1981 in Kitami, Hokkaidō, Japan), better known simply as Miz, is a Japanese pop/rock singer. Though most of her music is released in Japan, she does her work primarily from Gotland in Sweden, mainly doing promotional videos, photo shoots and recording there. She originally debuted in 1999 under Universal Music Japan using her real name, Watanabe Mizuki, releasing two singles. In 2003, she began working with the Swedish producer Tord Backstrom and debuted under Victor Entertainment with the pseudonym Miz in 2004. That same year, she released an English album in Sweden, with the lead single "Waiting" reaching #8 on the Hitlistan Swedish singles chart. In 2007, Watanabe returned to Universal Music Japan, changed her stage name to Mizrock, and released her first mini-album Good bye, yesterday and three singles. However, in 2009 she announced on her official blog that she had changed her stage name back to Miz. Her biggest hits in Japan are "New Day" and "In The Sky", the theme song for the Square Enix role-playing video game Grandia III.

== Biography ==
At a very young age, Miz expressed a great interest and talent in music. She always wanted to become one of the singers on the radio, but living in such a rural area as Hokkaidō, there were very few opportunities for her. One of Miz's biggest hobbies during her high school years was going to a local beauty salon. And since she was a regular customer, she became very good friends with the salon manager. At this time there was held a talent competition, with advertising posters put up in over 20,000 beauty salons all over Japan. The salon owner suggested that Miz enter the contest, which she won from hundreds of other competitors. Mizrock entered the nationwide beauty contest "'99 Princess Audition", and was the winner out of the 3,200 entrants.

After graduating from high school, she moved to Tokyo. Soon afterward, she was signed under Universal Victor and, under her real name, released I WILL(TX TV show Renai Slot Kuru Kuru V's ending theme song), her first single. Five months later, she released a second single called "Ambition"(PlayStation game Kouklo Theatro's theme song). Neither single charted in the top 100 singles and she was not asked to release anything else after that. Both singles are now out of print in most Japanese CD stores. Mizrock wrote the lyrics to all four of the songs on these singles.

In August 2001, a song of hers, "Aoi Kioku", was used as the image song in the PC game Hello, world appearing in October the following year, when it was released on the soundtrack for the game. After the release of Ambition, her career stalled. She kept taking singing lessons at a studio, and eventually made a demo tape with the help of a writer. She was introduced to a producer named Tord Bäckström, who was looking for someone to perform a song written by a Swedish writer. In 2003, she travelled to Sweden and her first single, "Waiting", entered the charts at #8. Five months later, Miz released her second single, "New Day". The single entered the charts at #20, and is currently her biggest single. Her album, Story Untold, was released on September 22, 2004, and contains ten all-English songs.

By that time, she had also released some other music. Her Japanese comeback single, "New Day", came out in 2004, entering the Oricon charts at #20. Five months later, her second single, "Waiting for", was released. Later in the month in Japan, Miz's first album Say It's Forever was released, reaching #20 in Japan, spending two weeks at #1 in Taiwan. Half of the album used Miz's own lyrics. To promote her first Japanese album, Miz was invited to a Channel V-hosted concert in Taiwan along with other local and foreign artists, where she performed three songs, "New Day"", Waiting for" and "Say It's Forever". She also attended an AIUEO show to gain more publicity in her short visit. (The host was apparently her friend before she made her first major recording in Japan.) She became one of the most popular Japanese artists in Taiwan that year. In November, Miz released a separate, English language album in Sweden called Story Untold, but it failed to get into the top 60. A special version was released with the entire Say It's Forever album on a bonus disc. In 2005, Miz released her third album, DREAMS, in Japan. The album included the bulk of Miz's Swedish release album, though with a few omissions and some new songs. In August, Miz released two items: a photobook called "An Ordinary Day" about Miz in Sweden and the "In The Sky" single (the game Square Enix's Grandia III theme song). "In The Sky" was the Japanese version of a song from Story Untold called "Amazing". (For the English language release of the game a separate English version was recorded with different lyrics). Two new singles were quickly released in the following months: a Japanese version of "Backseat Baby" from her Swedish album in late 2005 and a completely new song, "Bittersweet", in 2006. These were followed by her second album, Mizrock.

After releasing Mizrock in February 2006, Miz disappeared for a long while. In May 2007, however, her official website was updated with news of a new release coming in July. Other websites such as ORICON and Tower Records confirmed this, listing a mini-album titled Good bye, yesterday to be released under the name "Mizrock". It is also with this album that Miz moved from Victor Interactive to Nayutawave Records.

In June 2007, "Good bye, yesterday" from her Good bye, yesterday album was used as the second ending song for the anime, Romeo X Juliet. In October 2007 she released a new single, "Best Friend", and in February 2008 "Thank You". On May 3, 2010, Miz updated her blog with a link to information regarding her new single, "'Faraway", released on May 26, 2010, under the name of "Miz" for the first time in four years. A new single by Miz, "Just Try", was scheduled to be released on July 24, 2011.

She took part in reality show "Otoboke House" and in the program "POPS". For her role plays are: Maureen in "Rent" (2010), "I got Merman" (2012) and Candy in "Tatoo 14" (2012). On September 16, 2014, the Korean girl group, TTS (TaeTiSeo), a subunit of Girls' Generation, released Holler, which is a cover of Miz's song, "Hello Me!".

Following on September 18, 2014, Miz announced her marriage and stated that she will be taking a break from her music career.

== Discography ==
=== Mizuki Watanabe ===
Singles

- "I Will" (June 18, 1999)

TV Tokyo's Show renai SLOT KURU-kuru V (恋愛スロット クルくるV) ending theme song

- "Ambition" (November 24, 1999)

PlayStation Game Eternal Eyes (ククロセアトロ～悠久の瞳～, Kouklo Theatro: Yūkyū no Hitomi) theme song. First pressing trading card included

- "Aoi Kioku" (青い記憶) (August 2001)

Nitroplus's PC game Hello, world. opening theme song

Compilations / other works

- Hello, world. original sound track (October 25, 2002)
- Aoi Kioku (Image version) (青い記憶 (Image version))

=== Miz ===
Singles (Japan)

- "New Day" (February 18, 2004)

JVC Liquid Crystal Television EXE and Lip Lap commercial song

- "Waiting For" (July 21, 2004)

JVC Enterprises image song

- "In the Sky" (August 3, 2005)

First pressing DVD included Square Enix PlayStation 2 game Grandia III main theme song

- "Backseat Baby" (November 30, 2005)

CD extra enhanced

- "Bittersweet" (January 25, 2006)

CD extra enhanced

- "Faraway" (May 26, 2010)
- Just Try (July 24, 2011)
- "Winning Winds" (August 21, 2011)

Albums (Japan)

- Say It's Forever (September 22, 2004)

First pressing DVD included "If you run"：Yomiuri Telecasting Corporation & Nippon Television program Dotch Cooking Show ending theme song

- Dreams (March 9, 2005)

English language album

- Mizrock (February 22, 2006)

First pressing DVD included

Singles (Sweden)

- "Waiting" (September 13, 2004)

CD extra enhanced

Albums (Sweden)

- Story Untold (November 17, 2004)

First pressing special bonus disk Say It's Forever included

Compilations / other works

- garp - garp2 (June 30, 2003) "Say It's Forever"
- V.A. Light Mellow "blue oasis" (July 21, 2004) "Say It's Forever"

Photobook

- An Ordinary Day (August 4, 2005), (JVC Entertainment Network Publication) - online mail order limit

=== Mizrock ===
Mini albums

- Good bye, yesterday (July 25, 2007)

First pressing DVD included "Good bye, yesterday"：Mainichi Broadcasting System & Tokyo Broadcasting System program anime Romeo x Juliet ending theme song

Singles

- "Best Friend" (October 24, 2007)

First pressing DVD included "Best Friend"：Nippon Television program Music Fighter (音楽戦士 MUSIC FIGHTER) POWER PLAY
"Hello me!":Composer Figge Boström, Anna Nordell

- "Thank You xxx" (February 20, 2008)

First pressing DVD included "Pepper Keibu" (ペッパー警部; Inspector Pepper) (July 2, 2008), cover of the 1976 hit song by Pink Lady

Compilations / other works

- "Ga-Ki ~ ~ Yu Aku Tribute " (July 30, 2008)

"Pepper Keibu"

- "Q; indy "Philharmonique" (August 3, 2008)

"Understand"

- "Rarapipo" (January 28, 2009)

"Baby Maria"
