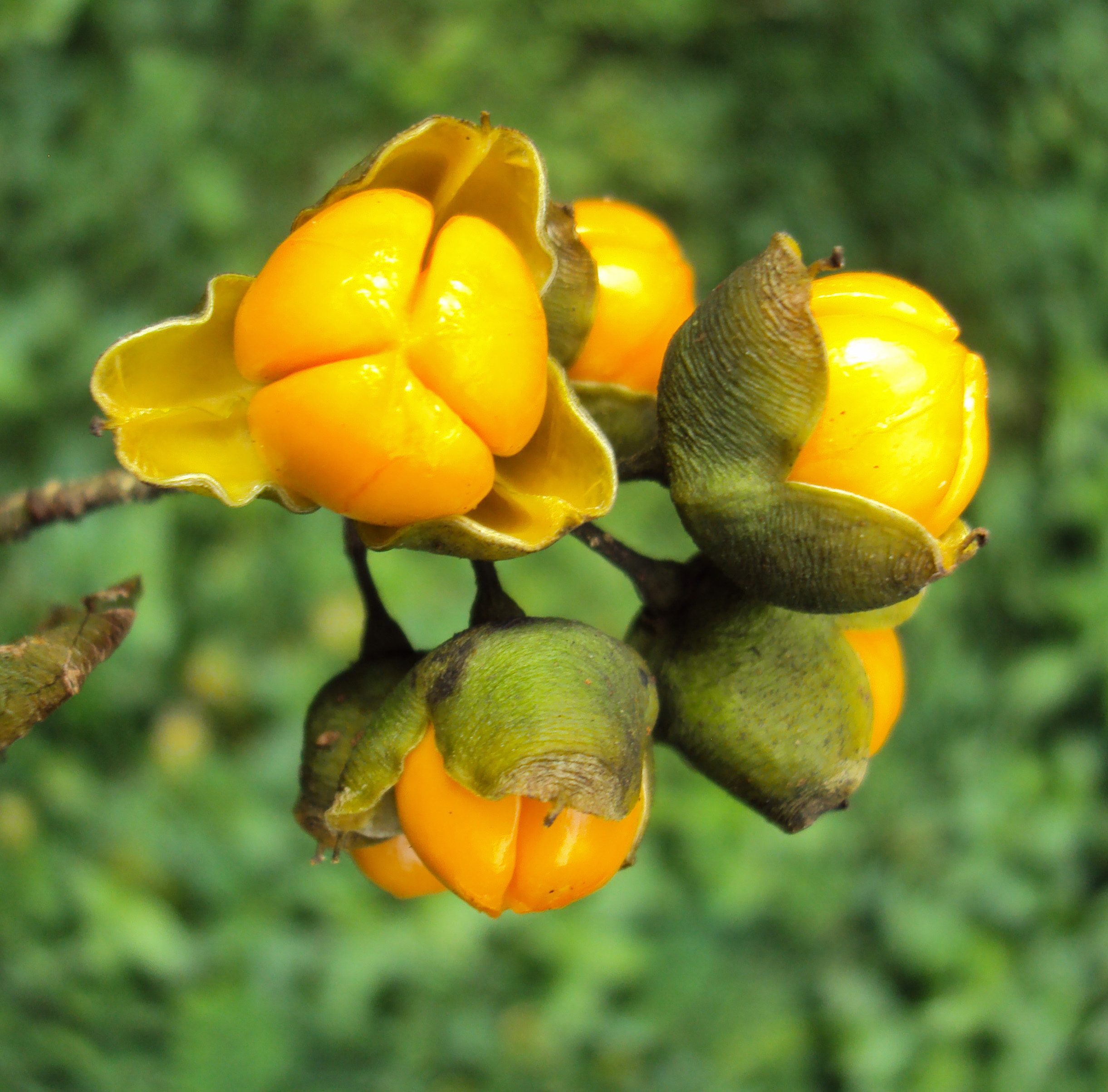
- Fruits

Scientific classification
- Kingdom: Plantae
- Clade: Embryophytes
- Clade: Tracheophytes
- Clade: Spermatophytes
- Clade: Angiosperms
- Clade: Eudicots
- Clade: Rosids
- Order: Celastrales
- Family: Celastraceae
- Genus: Celastrus
- Species: C. paniculatus

Binomial name
- Celastrus paniculatus Willd.

Synonyms
- Celastrus dependens Wall.

= Celastrus paniculatus =

Species of flowering plant

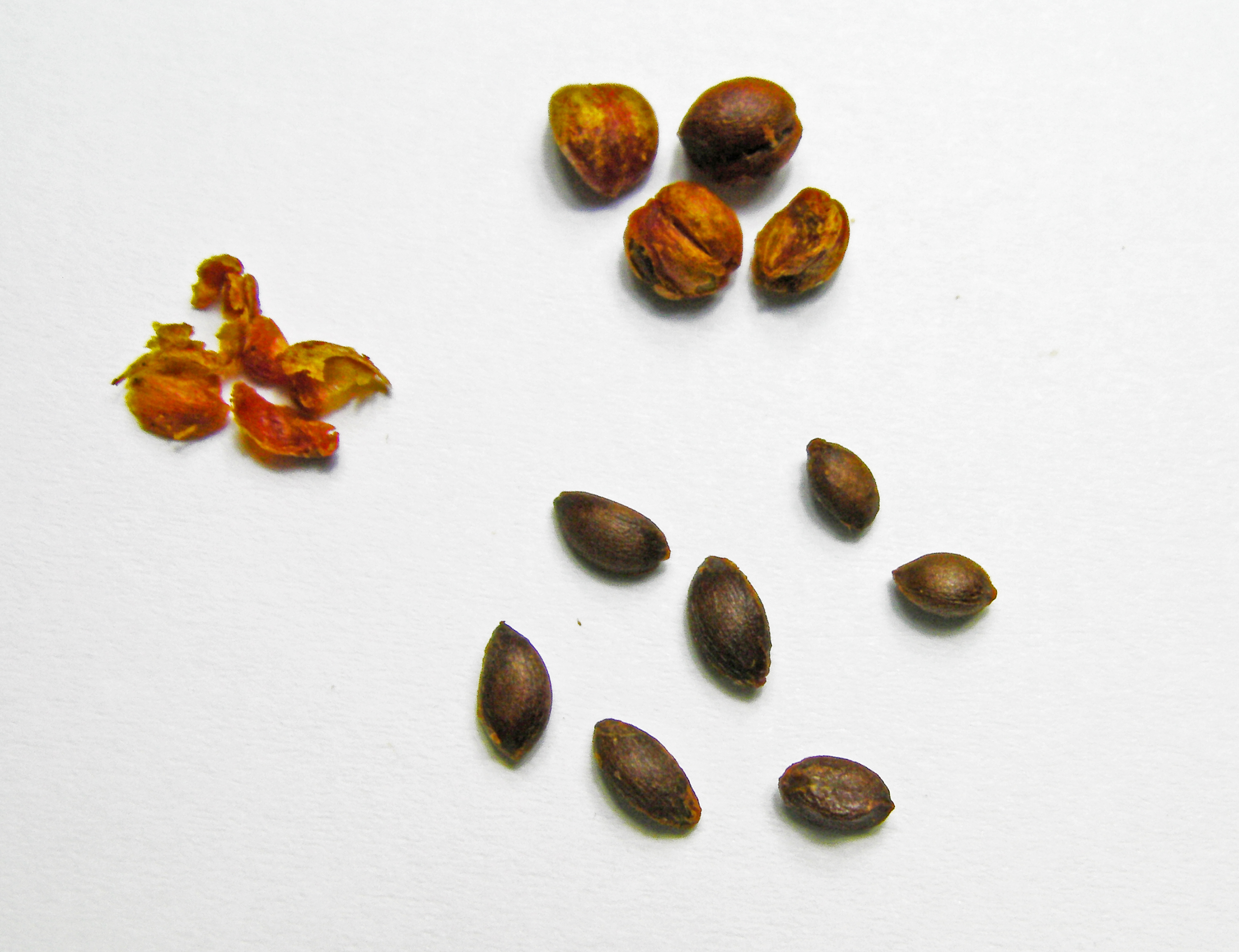
Seeds

Celastrus paniculatus is a woody liana commonly known as black oil plant, climbing staff tree, and intellect tree (Sanskrit: jyotishmati ज्योतीष्मती, Hindi: mal-kangni माल-कांगनी, Chinese: deng you teng 灯油藤). This climbing shrub grows throughout India at elevations up to 1,800 m (5,900 ft).

C. paniculatus is a deciduous vine with stems up to 10 cm (3.9 in) in diameter and 6 m (20 ft) long with rough, pale brown exfoliating bark covered densely with small, elongated lenticles. The leaves are simple, broad, and oval, obovate or elliptic in shape, with toothed margins.

== Traditional medicine ==
Oil from the seeds is used as a traditional medicine in Indian Unani and Ayurvedic medicine.

== Poisonous relative ==
Celastrus paniculatus has a relative that grows in the United States that is poisonous (Celastrus orbiculatus), so identifying this plant carefully can be important.
