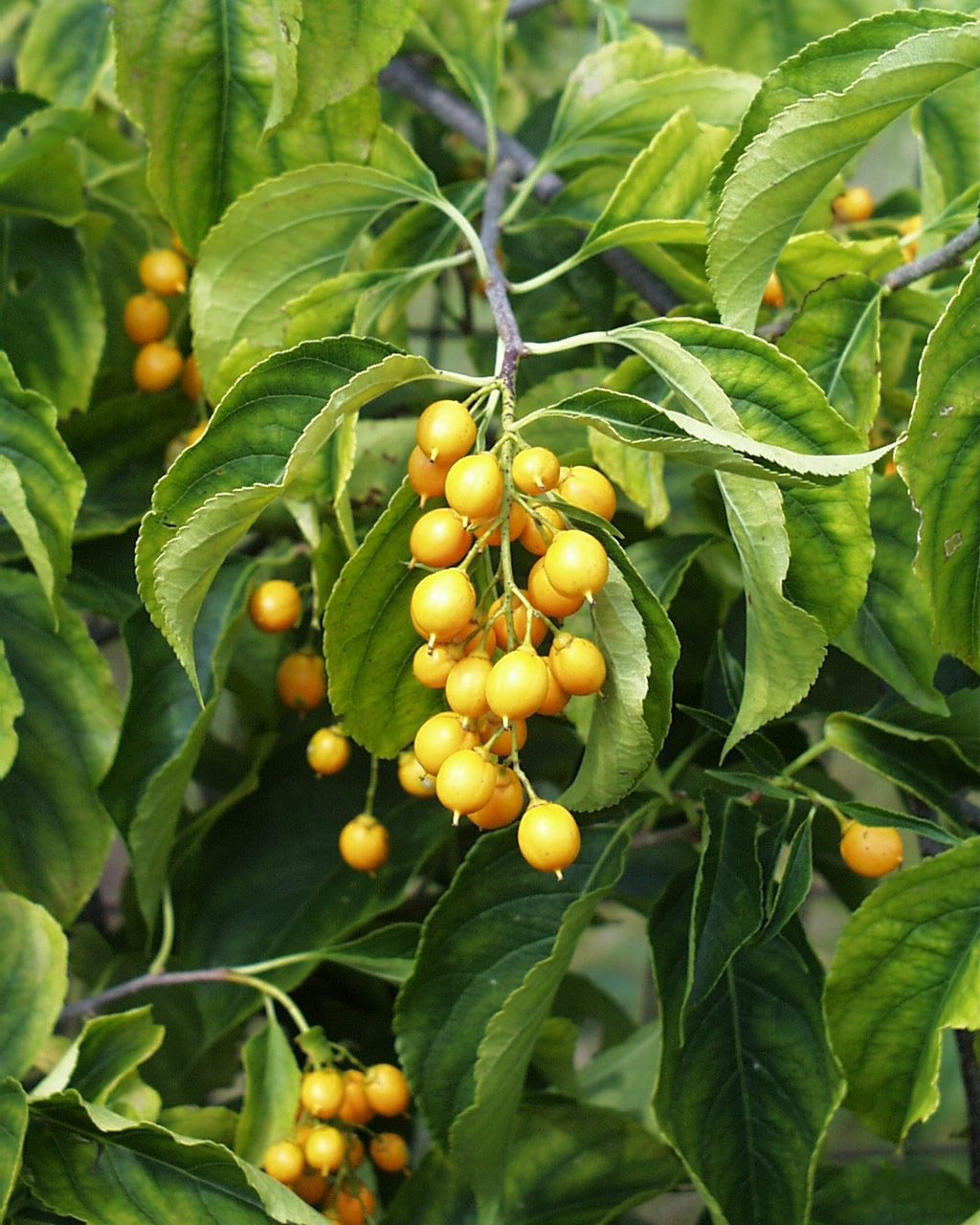
- Celastrus scandens

Scientific classification
- Kingdom: Plantae
- Clade: Tracheophytes
- Clade: Angiosperms
- Clade: Eudicots
- Clade: Rosids
- Order: Celastrales
- Family: Celastraceae
- Genus: Celastrus; L.

Type species
- Celastrus scandens L.

Species
- See text

Synonyms
- Evonimoides Duhamel; Evonymoides Isnard ex Medik.; Monocelastrus F.T.Wang & Tang; Schieckea H.Karst.

= Celastrus =

Staff vine

Genus of plants

Celastrus, commonly known as staff vine, staff tree or bittersweet, is a genus of the family Celastraceae; it contains over 40 species of shrubs and vines, which have a wide distribution in East Asia, Australasia, Africa, and the Americas.

== Description ==
The leaves are alternate and simple, ovoid, and typically 5–20 cm (2.0–7.9 in) long. The flowers are small, white, pink or greenish, and borne in long panicles; the fruit is a three-valved berry.

In North America, they are known as bittersweet, presumably a result of confusion with the unrelated bittersweet (Solanum dulcamara) by early colonists. C. orbiculatus is a serious invasive weed in much of eastern North America.

== Species ==
As of June 2026, Plants of the World Online accepts the following 44 species:

- Celastrus aculeatus Merr.
- Celastrus angulatus Maxim.
- Celastrus australis Harv. & F.Muell.
- Celastrus caseariifolius Lundell
- Celastrus cuneatus (Rehder & E.H.Wilson) C.Y.Cheng & T.C.Kao
- Celastrus flagellaris Rupr.
- Celastrus franchetianus Loes.
- Celastrus gemmatus Loes.
- Celastrus glaucophyllus Rehder & E.H.Wilson
- Celastrus grenadensis Urb.
- Celastrus hindsii Benth.
- Celastrus hirsutus H.F.Comber
- Celastrus homaliifolius P.S.Hsu
- Celastrus hookeri Prain
- Celastrus hypoleucoides P.L.Chiu
- Celastrus hypoleucus (Oliv.) Warb. ex Loes.
- Celastrus kusanoi Hayata
- Celastrus lenticellatus Lundell
- Celastrus madagascariensis Loes.
- Celastrus membranifolius Prain
- Celastrus microcarpus D.Don
- Celastrus monospermoides Loes.
- Celastrus monospermus Roxb.
- Celastrus novoguineensis Merr. & L.M.Perry
- Celastrus oblanceifolius Chen H.Wang & P.C.Tsoong
- Celastrus obovatifolius X.Y.Mu & Z.X.Zhang
- Celastrus orbiculatus Thunb.
- Celastrus panamensis Lundell
- Celastrus paniculatus Willd.
- Celastrus pringlei Rose
- Celastrus punctatus Thunb.
- Celastrus richii A.Gray
- Celastrus rosthornianus Loes.
- Celastrus rugosus Rehder & E.H.Wilson
- Celastrus scandens L.
- Celastrus stephanotiifolius (Makino) Makino
- Celastrus stylosus Wall.
- Celastrus subspicatus Hook.
- Celastrus tonkinensis Pit.
- Celastrus vaniotii (H.Lév.) Rehder
- Celastrus virens (F.T.Wang & T.Tang) C.Y.Cheng & T.C.Kao
- Celastrus vulcanicola Donn.Sm.
- Celastrus yuloensis X.Y.Mu
- Celastrus zhejiangensis P.L.Chiu, G.Y.Li & Z.H.Chen
