= Sweet and Sour =

Sweet and sour is a type of food or sauce widely used in various far eastern cuisines.

Sweet and Sour or Sweet & Sour may also refer to:

== Film and TV ==
- Sweet and Sour (1963 film), a 1963 French-Italian comedy film
- Sweet and Sour (1984 TV series), a 1984 Australian TV series about a fictional music group, The Takeaways, that aired on ABC
- Sweet and Sour (2000 talk show), an Australian community television talk show that debuted in 2000
- "Sweet and Sour", a 1991 episode of the PBS show Shining Time Station
- Sweet & Sour (film), a 2021 South Korean film

== Music ==
- Sweet & Sour (Sistar EP), 2014
- Sweet & Sour (ExWhyZ EP), 2024
- "Sweet 'n' Sour", a song by the Jon Spencer Blues Explosion
- "Sweet and Sour", a song by Jolin Tsai from the 2005 album J-Game
- "Sweet & Sour", a song by Jawsh 685
- "Sweet & Sour", a song by Mike Williams, 2016

== See also ==
- Bittersweet (disambiguation)
- Khatta Meetha (disambiguation)
- Sour mix, a mixer used in many cocktails
- Sweet Sour, a 2012 album by Band of Skulls
  - "Sweet Sour" (song), the title track from the album
- Sour Sweet, a 1982 novel by Timothy Mo
- Soursweet, a 1988 British film directed by Mike Newell
