= Bittersweet Creek =

Stream in South Dakota, U.S.

Coordinates: 44°03′46″N 103°42′01″W

Bittersweet Creek is a stream in the U.S. state of South Dakota.

Some say Bittersweet Creek received its name from the peculiar taste of its water, while others believe an abundance of the bittersweet plant caused the name to be selected.

== See also ==
- List of rivers of South Dakota
