= Snake berry =

Snake berry (or snakeberry) is a common name for several plants and may refer to:

- Actaea rubra
- Clintonia borealis
- Maianthemum dilatatum
- Potentilla indica, with fruits similar in appearance to a strawberry
- Solanum dulcamara
- A general term for many plants producing berries of unknown edibility
