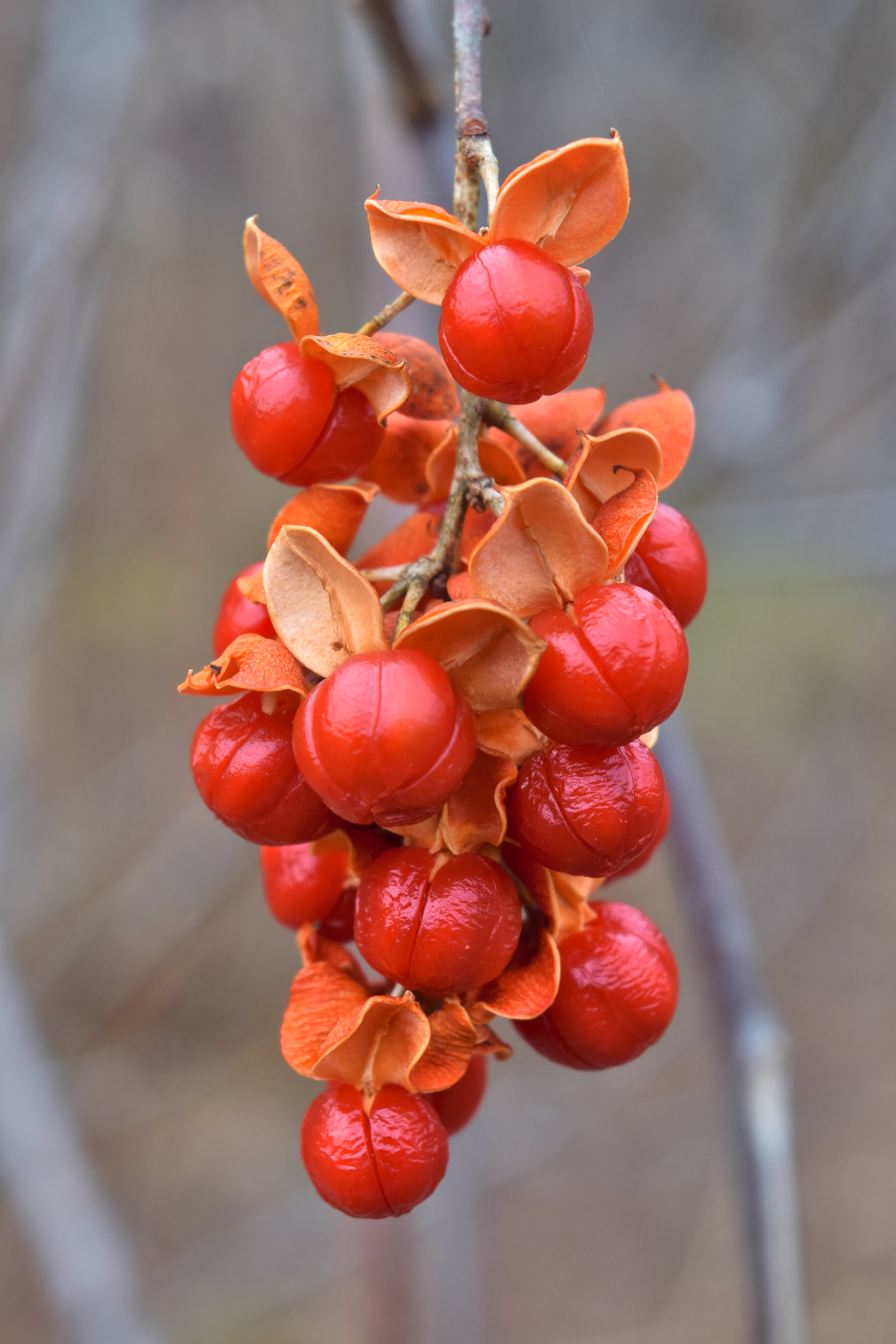
- Ripe fruit

Scientific classification
- Kingdom: Plantae
- Clade: Embryophytes
- Clade: Tracheophytes
- Clade: Spermatophytes
- Clade: Angiosperms
- Clade: Eudicots
- Clade: Rosids
- Order: Celastrales
- Family: Celastraceae
- Genus: Celastrus
- Species: C. scandens

Binomial name
- Celastrus scandens L.

= Celastrus scandens =

Species of vine

Celastrus scandens, commonly called American bittersweet, is a species of bittersweet that blooms mostly in June and is commonly found on rich, well-drained soils of woodlands.

== Description ==
It is a sturdy perennial vine that may have twining, woody stems that are 30 feet (9.1 m) or longer and 1 inch (25 mm) or more thick at the base. The stems are yellowish-green to brown and wind around other vegetation, sometimes killing saplings by restricting further growth. It has tiny, scentless flowers at the tips of the branches. It has colorful, orange fruits that are the size of a pea. These fruits are poisonous to humans when ingested, but are favorites of birds.

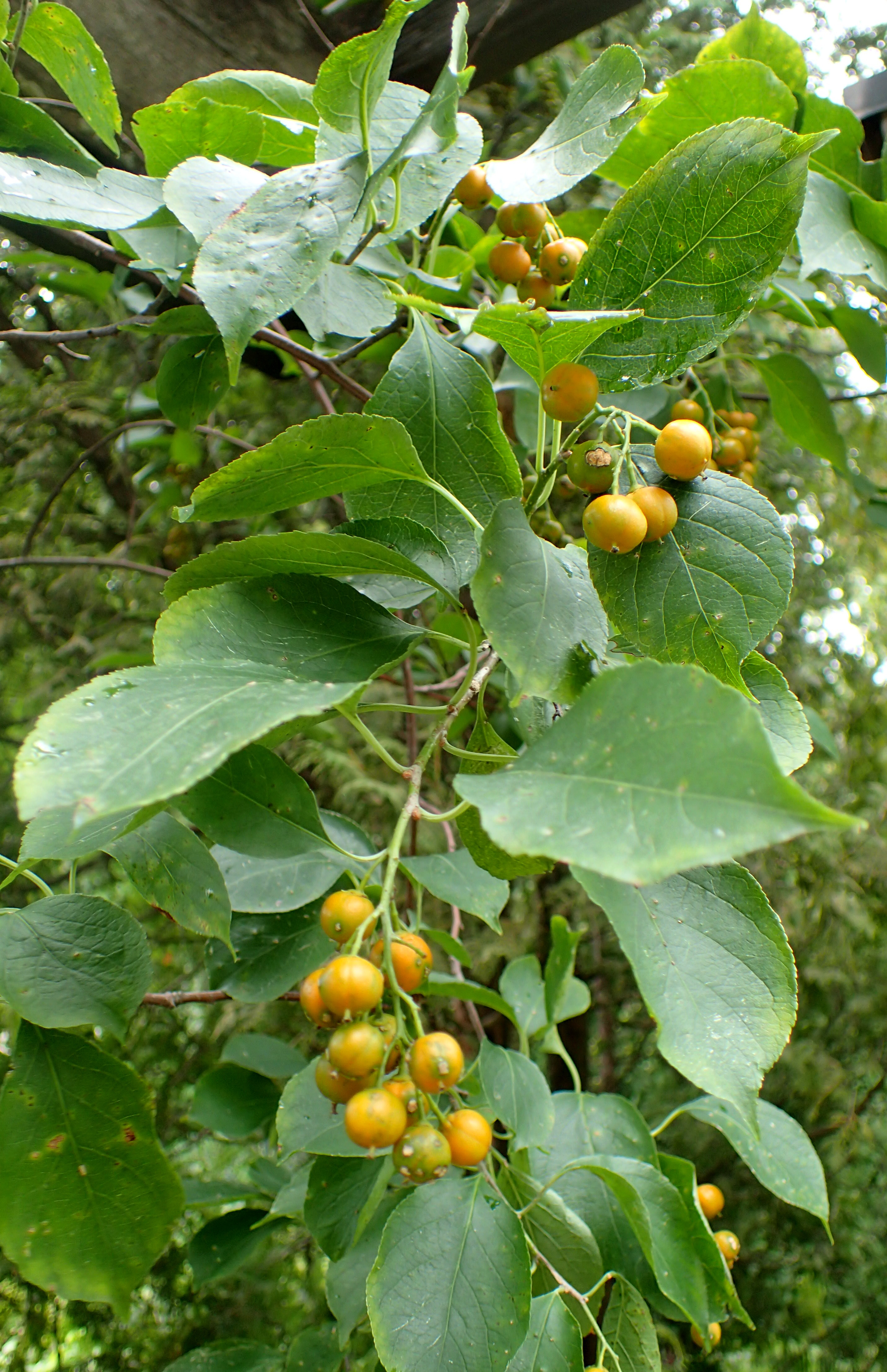
Celastrus scandens at Chicago Botanic Garden.

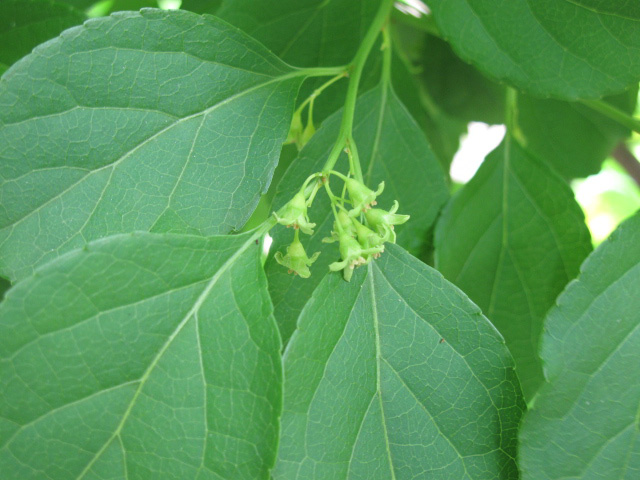
Celastrus scandens flowers.

== Uses ==
C. scandens roots were used by Native Americans and pioneers to induce vomiting, to treat venereal disease, and to treat symptoms of tuberculosis. It also sees use as a decorative plant, both in landscaping and seasonal floral arrangements.

== Taxonomy ==
Celastrus scandens is native to central and eastern North America. It was given the name bittersweet by colonists in the 18th century because the fruits resembled the appearance of the fruits of common nightshade (Solanum dulcamara), which was also called bittersweet. Today, American bittersweet is the accepted common name of C. scandens in large part to distinguish it from an invasive relative, C. orbiculatus (Oriental bittersweet), from Asia. Hybrids of C. orbiculatus and C. scandens, entirely produced from C. scandens seed and C. orbicularis pollen, showed reduced seed set and small, infertile pollen.
