= Khatta Meetha =

Khatta Meetha is a Hindi/Urdu phrase which means "sweet and sour". It may refer to:

- Khatta Meetha (1978 film), a Bollywood film directed by Basu Chatterjee, starring Ashok Kumar and Rakesh Roshan in the lead roles
- Khatta Meetha (2010 film), a Bollywood film directed by Priyadarshan, starring Akshay Kumar and Trisha Krishnan in the lead roles

== See also ==
- Sweet and Sour (disambiguation)
