= Bitter Suite =

Bitter Suite may refer to:

- "Bitter Suite", a song on Marillion's album Misplaced Childhood
- Bitter Suite (album), a 1989 album from Hue & Cry
- "The Bitter Suite", an episode of Xena: Warrior Princess
- "The Bitter Suite", a song on album Years to Burn by Calexico and Iron & Wine
- Bitter Suite, UK title of Time Share (2000 film)

== See also ==
- Bittersweet (disambiguation)
