= Eminence Symphony Orchestra =

Australian symphony orchestra

- Eminence Symphony Orchestra logo

Background information
- Origin: Sydney, Australia
- Genres: Popular, film score, video game, new-age
- Years active: 2003–present
- Members: Hiroaki Yura (Founder, Concertmaster; Violin); Maestro Philip Chu (Conductor); Kumiko Ito (Piano); Minah Choe (Cello); James Fortune (Flute); Joshua Hill (Percussion); Zane Banks (Guitar)
- Past members: Ayako Ishikawa (Violin)
- Website: twitter.com/EminenceOnline

The Eminence Symphony Orchestra founded in Sydney, Australia is an independent symphony orchestra which delves into the classical music featured in video games and anime, as well as film scores.

== History ==
Eminence was founded in 2003 by a small group of friends, led by the virtuoso solo violinist Hiroaki Yura. The difference in the cultural backgrounds between these friends as well as their differing experiences and qualifications contributed to what would be their first concert.

Eminence focuses particularly on the music of notable Japanese video games and anime.

While the trademark of Eminence is the symphony orchestra, the organisation also delves into smaller-based concerts featuring three to five musicians as well as small ensembles, branded differently under Eminence Artists. More recently, the orchestra has offered their services to a wide range of entertainment media such as video games and anime, including the recording of music for many notable game publishers and developers, and for a number of film scores. These services were initially provided through a Sydney-based business entity, Eminence Group Pty Ltd, while the orchestra continued to operate under its existing name.

Awareness of the Eminence brand increased over time, and many opportunities for performances, recording and production services arose in other countries, prompting offices to be established in USA and Japan.

This facilitated further work in those countries, particularly in Japan. Australia continues to be the home base for the orchestra, with the majority of recordings being performed in Sydney.

Meanwhile, Eminence Group Pty Ltd which represented Eminence Symphony Orchestra and its services through license was placed into voluntary liquidation with an appointed liquidator on 21 December 2010. A resolution to wind up the company was made on the same day.

The Eminence Symphony Orchestra continues to operate through Eminence Artists in Australia, Creative Intelligence Arts, Inc. in Japan and Eminence Group North America in the United States of America.

== Concerts and performances ==
=== A Night in Fantasia ===
Eminence's debut concert, A Night in Fantasia, was held on 31 October and 1 November 2003. It was born out of the idea that such an event had never been done before in Australia. The first of a series of concerts was mainly composed of music from Final Fantasy and Studio Ghibli films, and took place at Sydney Congress Hall with tickets that sold well before the night. The overall success as well as the enthusiastic support of the first concert proved a point to the organisers that such a concept of cultural music would appeal to a wide range of people. At this point the company running the concert was 'Infinity 8LUE', and the orchestra was the 'Infinity 8LUE Symphony Orchestra'.

=== A Night in Fantasia 2004 ===
In 2004, the orchestra was fully formed, and held A Night in Fantasia 2004 at Verbrugghen Hall at the Sydney Conservatorium of Music on 30 and 31 October. William Motzing became the Chief Conductor and Artistic Director, Daniel Smith became the Assistant Conductor and Final Fantasy composer Nobuo Uematsu was a guest of honour at all four performances. This concert marked the name change for the orchestra, as they became known as the Eminence Symphony Orchestra. Infinity 8LUE was the company behind the concert, and shortly after finalised the name change by becoming Eminence.

A Night in Fantasia 2004 (Studio Ghibli Performance) (2004)
No.	Title	Length
1.	"The Great Legend" (Laputa – The Castle in the Sky)
2.	"Sophie's Tomorrow" (Howl's Moving Castle)
3.	"Secret Garden" (Howl's Moving Castle)
4.	"Cave of Mind" (Howl's Moving Castle)
5.	"I'm so Glad" (My Neighbor Totoro)
6.	"Legend of Ashitaka" (Princess Mononoke)
7.	"Journey to the West" (Princess Mononoke)
8.	"World of the Dead" (Princess Mononoke)
9.	"The Boy of the Dragon" (Spirited Away)
10.	"The River from that Day" (Spirited Away)

=== Piano Stories ===
Alexey Yemtsov performed the first Piano Stories concert on 15 April, at Verbrugghen Hall. Featuring work from Studio Ghibli, Yoko Kanno and Shirō Sagisu, Piano Stories marked the beginning of a series of concerts celebrating piano scores from a selection of anime and gaming soundtracks.

=== World of John Williams ===
2005 saw Eminence present the World of John Williams concert, held on 8 July at Sydney Town Hall. Phillip Chu and Daniel Smith conducted the Eminence Symphony Orchestra and the Eminence Choir through performance featuring music from one of Hollywood's most recognised composers, John Williams. His work from Harry Potter, Schindler's List, Saving Private Ryan, Star Wars, E.T. the Extra-Terrestrial, Home Alone and Raiders of the Lost Ark was performed. Daniel Smith conducted the Australian Premiere of "Battle of the Heroes" (from Star Wars Episode III).

World of John Williams (2006)
No.	Title	Length
1.	"Hedwig's Theme" (Harry Potter and the Sorcerer's Stone)
2.	"Harry's Wondrous World" (Harry Potter and the Sorcerer's Stone)
3.	"Schindler's List Theme" (Schindler's List)
4.	"Hymn to the Fallen" (Saving Private Ryan)
5.	"Across the Stars" (Star Wars: Episode II – Attack of the Clones)
6.	"Adventures on Earth" (E.T. the Extra-Terrestrial)
7.	"Main Theme" (Star Wars Episode IV: A New Hope)
8.	"The Imperial March" (Star Wars Episode IV: A New Hope)
9.	"Throne Room & End Theme" (Star Wars Episode IV: A New Hope)
10.	"The Flag Parade" (Star Wars: Episode I – The Phantom Menace)
11.	"Battle of the Heroes" (Star Wars: Episode III – Revenge of the Sith)
12.	"Main Theme" (Raiders of the Lost Ark)
13.	"Duel of the Fates" (Star Wars Episode I: The Phantom Menace)

=== Piano Stories II ===
In the same year Piano Stories II was held at Verbrugghen Hall with Stuart Wright performing pieces from various popular culture video games and anime including Howl's Moving Castle, Kiki's Delivery Service, Voices of a Distant Star, Macross Plus and Noir. The Eminence Quartet also appeared on the night. The concert was held on 6 August at Verbrugghen Hall.

=== Destiny: The Dream Time Ensemble ===
Later on in 2005 Eminence presented Destiny: The Dream Time Ensemble. Held at Verbrugghen Hall and the National Theatre, This marked the debut of a performance outside of Sydney, as the city of Melbourne in Australia witnessed the 9 member elite chamber music ensemble group perform music from a variety of composers. These included Joe Hisaishi, Nobuo Uematsu, Michiru Oshima, Shirō Sagisu and Toshihiko Sahashi. The concert also marked the first time Eminence utilised footage from the original films, games and television serials in alongside the music. The members of Destiny were: Hiroaki Yura (Violin), Ayako Ishikawa (Violin), Christian Boennelykke (Viola), Kenichi Mizushima (Violoncello), Hanae Seto (Clarinet), James Fortune (Flute), Joshua Hill (Percussion), Chiron Meller (Percussion) and Jem Harding (Piano).

=== A Night in Fantasia 2005 ===
A Night in Fantasia 2005 saw a large change in venue, this time to be held at the Sydney Town Hall. Philip Chu became Chief Conductor and the night's music programme also saw fresh changes (due to the work of the AV Director and co-producer) with the inclusion of many popular anime and video game titles including Final Fantasy VII, Kingdom Hearts, Metal Gear Solid, Neon Genesis Evangelion, Onimusha, Halo, Fruits Basket, Super Mario, The Legend of Zelda, Tsubasa Chronicle, Gran Turismo, InuYasha, Naruto, Ace Combat 5: The Unsung War and Rurouni Kenshin. The event wrote history by hosting the World Premiere of the World of Warcraft Suite, and again saw the use of footage from the original titles alongside the music. The concert featured the Eminence Choir which assisted the wider music selection greatly.

=== Piano Stories III ===
In 2006 Eminence brought the next chapter in the concert series Piano Stories. Featuring acclaimed pianist Alexey Yemtsov who had performed previously in the first Piano Stories, the night highlighted Studio Ghibli and Final Fantasy pieces. Special guest violinists Hiroaki Yura and Ayako Ishikawa were present, and was held on 15 April in Melbourne's National Theatre and on 22 April in Sydney's Verbrugghen Hall.

=== Spirited Away with Youmi ===
This concert was designed to run alongside A Night in Fantasia 2006. Spirited Away with Youmi was held on the same day as Melbourne's concert and also took place on 6 July in Sydney. Youmi Kimura performed songs from Spirited Away, Princess Mononoke and My Neighbor Totoro among others.

=== A Night in Fantasia 2006 ===
A Night in Fantasia 2006 was held on 2 July in Melbourne Town Hall and 7 July in Sydney Town Hall. The concert featured music from Final Fantasy, Shadow of the Colossus and Studio Ghibli, and also welcomed special guest Youmi Kimura, the composer of both the Spirited Away and Howl's Moving Castle's ending themes. It also featured Hiroaki Yura on violin and Phillip Chu as conductor. The concert also premiered music from the newest addition to the Final Fantasy series, Final Fantasy XII and was the world's first symphonic concert to be accompanied by footage from Studio Ghibli films.

=== Piano Stories IV ===
Eminence's newest addition to the Piano Stories series featured pianist Krzysztof Malek performing pieces from a number of video game titles including Tetris, the Final Fantasy series, Xenogears, The Legend of Zelda and Kingdom Hearts II as well as a number of anime titles including Noir, My Neighbour Totoro, The Melancholy of Haruhi Suzumiya, Azumanga Daioh, Neon Genesis Evangelion, Fullmetal Alchemist and Gundam SEED Destiny. Eminence also announced a mystery guest artist that would appear alongside Krzysztof Malek, which would later be revealed to be Ayako Ishikawa on the violin. The Melbourne performance was part of the Manifest convention, and was held in Melba Hall within The University of Melbourne on 23 September. Sydney's concert took place in Verbrugghen Hall within the Sydney Conservatorium of Music on 14 October.

=== Passion ===
Eminence announced a new concert series that began in December featuring Ayako Ishikawa and Hiroaki Yura on violin and also featured Natalia Raspopova on piano, Joshua Hill on percussion and Zane Banks on the guitar. On their minisite for the concert, Eminence announced that they collaborated with Japanese video game composers Yasunori Mitsuda and Hitoshi Sakimoto, whose work was featured alongside other notable anime and video game titles. The concert was held in Melbourne on 9 December at the Merlyn Theatre, followed by Sydney on 16 December at the Sydney Conservatorium of Music, finally ending with Eminence's debut Singapore concert on 23 December and was held at the Victoria Concert Hall. Yasunori Mitsuda was a special guest of honour for all three performances, and also played the bouzouki. Hitoshi Sakimoto also joined him as a guest, though only at the Sydney performance. The concert featured music from games such as Chrono Trigger, Chrono Cross, Vagrant Story, Final Fantasy XII, Xenosaga, Shadow of the Colossus and Super Mario Bros. The anime pieces came from a number of sources including Haibane Renmei, Tsubasa Chronicle and .hack//Liminality.

Passion (2007)
No.	Title	Length
1.	"Is Kirite Burning Up?" (Kirite)
2.	"Free Bird" (Haibane Renmei)
3.	"Sakura" (Xenosaga II)
4.	"Time's Scar" (Chrono Cross)
5.	"In the Beach of Dreams – Another World" (Chrono Cross)
6.	"Pain" (Xenosaga)
7.	"Radical Dreamers" (Chrono Cross)
8.	"Sailing to the World" (Sailing to the World)
9.	"Ferris Wheel" (Colors of Life)
10.	"Mai" (.hack//Liminality)
11.	"The Sunlit Earth" (Shadow of the Colossus)

=== A Night in Fantasia 2007: Symphonic Games Edition ===
First announced at their Passion concert, Eminence chose to split their annual concert series into two performances, the first of which solely focused on video games. The concerts took place at Sydney Town Hall on 20 and 21 April 2007, and the concert in Melbourne was performed in Hamer Hall on 27 April 2007.

Special guest composers included Hitoshi Sakimoto, Junichi Nakatsuru and Masaru Shiina, present at all of the concerts. Yoko Shimomura was also slated to appear at all concerts, but was prevented from attending the Melbourne concert for unknown reasons. In addition, Yasunori Mitsuda, Kow Otani and Shirō Hamaguchi joined the aforementioned composers as guests in both Sydney performances.

The concert featured music from Super Mario Bros., Kingdom Hearts II, the Metal Gear Solid series, the Final Fantasy series, World of Warcraft, Legend of Zelda: Twilight Princess, Shadow of the Colossus, Tales of Legendia, Xenosaga Episode 1, Soulcalibur 3, Odin Sphere, Legend of Mana and Deltora Quest, with "Time's Scar" from Chrono Cross featured as encores in both Sydney and Melbourne. However, "One Winged Angel" from Final Fantasy VII was played as an encore to the Sydney performances, while the Melbourne performance received a repeat of the Metal Gear Solid theme. The concert also included the Eminence Choir, who last performed in A Night in Fantasia 2005. In addition to video game music, a piece from Romeo x Juliet and one from Final Fantasy VII Advent Children was performed.

=== Destiny – Reunion ===
Accompanying the announcement of Ayako's Violin Recital, was Destiny – Reunion, a continuation of Destiny in 2005, performed on 28 July, including a brand new line up of music from some of the world's most famous video games and anime. Featuring Eminence founder, Hiroaki Yura among the musicians playing, the concert included never-before-heard arrangements exclusive to Destiny – Reunion.

Destiny: Dreamer's Alliance (2007)
No.	Title	Length
1.	"Opening" (Tsugunai: Atonement)
2.	"Main Theme" (Odin Sphere)
3.	"Main Theme" (Romeo x Juliet)
4.	"Hako no niwa" (Rakugaki Kingdom II | Graffiti Kingdom)
5.	"The Attic Library" (Odin Sphere)
6.	"Tragedy" (Romeo x Juliet)
7.	"Nocturne" (Kirite)
8.	"Sailing to the World" (The Seventh Seal)
9.	"Vigor" (Romeo x Juliet)
10.	"Nephilim" (Xenosaga Episode I)
11.	"Oath" (Romeo x Juliet)
12.	"The Fall of Darkness" (Kirite)
13.	"Dash" (Romeo x Juliet)
14.	"Circle of Eternity" (Kirite)
15.	"Radical Dreamers" (Chrono Cross)
16.	"Duel of the Fates" (Star Wars Episode I: The Phantom Menace)

=== A Night in Fantasia 2007: Anime Edition ===
The second part of the concert series focused entirely on anime, and the programme given out at Passion indicated a 'late 2007' concert date for both Sydney and Melbourne. At the 2007 Symphonic Games Edition concert, questionnaires were handed out, one of which asked attendees to list music found in various anime that they would like to hear in the concert. In October, entertainment website IGN announced the date – two consecutive concerts would be held on 18 November in the Sir John Clancy Auditorium of the University of New South Wales. Both concerts would feature music from famous anime including: Neon Genesis Evangelion, Tsubasa Chronicle, Noir, Le Portrait de Petit Cossette, Xenosaga II, Porco Rosso, .hack//Liminality and Elfen Lied. Famous Japanese composer and music producer Yuki Kajiura was the special guest during the concert and participated in a question and answer session with the host. Pamphlets were then handed out, which detailed the next future concert of the Eminence Symphony Orchestra, Unearthing Eden.

=== Unearthing Eden ~The sounds of AINARU~ ===
A follow-up on A Night in Fantasia 2007: Anime Edition, this performance was again a smaller-sized quintet, which featured a collaboration with Japanese composer, Kow Otani and Japanese singer AIKa. The concert was held in the Sydney Conservatorium of Music in Sydney for two days, but both days saw little audience in the performances.

=== A Night in Fantasia 2009 ===
After two years without having performed a concert of the magnitude of A Night in Fantasia 2007: Symphonic Games Edition, Eminence announced in February on a teaser website their next event, A Night in Fantasia 2009. Performed on 26 September 2009, the concert was held only on one night in Sydney at the Sydney Entertainment Centre. Music featured included suites from DEATH NOTE, Princess Mononoke, My Neighbor Totoro and Laputa: Castle in the Sky. Full pieces performed included James Hannigan's Soviet March from Command and Conquer: Red Alert 3, The Unsung War from Ace Combat 5: The Unsung War, Tonari Ni (Beside Me) from The Idolmaster composed by Go Shiina and performed by Chiaki Takahashi, and the world premiere of Dragon Age: Origins ending theme, I Am The One, sung by Aubrey Ashburn. The majority of the arrangements were created by AFRIKA composer Wataru Hokoyama. Other guests included Kow Otani and AIKA Tsuneoka, who performed a suite from Shadow of the Colossus, Inon Zur, Yasunori Mitsuda and Cris Velasco.

=== Other performances ===
==== Australian PlayStation 3 media launch ====
On 22 February 2007, Sony held the Australian media launch for PlayStation 3 in Sydney. Announcing Sony's sponsorship of Eminence for A Night in Fantasia 2007: Symphonic Games Edition, the orchestra performed a piece from Final Fantasy XII and a piece from Shadow of the Colossus as part of the presentation.

==== Hillsong Conference ====
In July 2007, the Eminence Symphony Orchestra performed at the opening ceremony for the Hillsong Conference, an annual mid-year Christian conference held in Sydney, Australia.

== Recordings ==
As well as performing concerts, the Eminence Symphony Orchestra has dedicated time for the recording of various pieces for anime and games.

=== Romeo x Juliet ===
In December 2006, Eminence recorded the solo instrumental music for the GONZO anime series Romeo x Juliet, which was composed by Hitoshi Sakimoto. The soundtrack was recorded at the Trackdown Scoring Stage at Fox Studios in Sydney. In January 2007, Eminence then recorded the full orchestral, string ensemble, chamber ensemble and more solo instrumentals for the anime series.

=== GrimGrimoire ===
Also in December 2006, solo instrumentals were recorded for the Vanillaware and Nippon Ichi PS2 game GrimGrimoire (グリムグリモア), which was to be composed by Hitoshi Sakimoto.

=== Deltora Quest (DS) ===
Eminence was once again working with Hitoshi Sakimoto in February 2007 for the recording of the Nintendo DS game, Deltora Quest, and adaptation to the anime based on Emily Rodda's children fantasy books Deltora series.

=== Opoona ===
In April 2007, Eminence took part in another recording with Hitoshi Sakimoto for ArtePiazza and Koei's Wii role-playing game Opoona.

=== Senjo no Valkyria: Gallian Chronicles ===
In August 2007, Eminence's participated in the recording of Sega's Senjou no Valkyria (aka Valkyria Chronicles) for the PlayStation 3.

=== Odin Sphere ===
Also in August 2007, Eminence worked together with Hitoshi Sakimoto's company, Basiscape, to record Odin Sphere's original soundtrack.

=== The Tower of Druaga: The Aegis of Uruk ===
Based on the classic Namco Bandai game The Tower of Druaga, The Aegis of Uruk, a GONZO anime television series with its music composed by Hitoshi Sakimoto, had its music recorded with Eminence in February 2008.

=== Soulcalibur IV ===
In April 2008, Eminence recorded the orchestral music for the fourth Namco Bandai video game installment of the Soulcalibur series, Soulcalibur IV which was composed by Junichi Nakatsuru.

=== Diablo III ===
In June 2008, Eminence recorded the orchestral music used for the announcement and trailers for Blizzard Entertainment's Diablo III.

=== Echoes of War: The Music of Blizzard Entertainment ===
Coinciding with the recording of Diablo III, Eminence approached Blizzard Entertainment with the idea of releasing an album of orchestrated music from across Blizzard's gaming universe, including Warcraft III: Reign of Chaos, World of Warcraft, StarCraft and Diablo. Guest composers were commissioned to compose their own unique take on the original tracks of the games, including Japanese composers Kow Otani and Masaru Shiina, and also Russell Brower who is currently Head Director of Audio within Blizzard. The album also featured tracks from then-unreleased games such as StarCraft II: Wings of Liberty and Diablo III. Two packages were announced for the album: Legendary and Standard. The Legendary edition of the album featured two audio discs, a DVD with a documentary and featurette, a wide-format booklet and 9 exclusive art cards; while the Standard Edition solely consisted of the two audio discs.

=== Makoto Shinkai Image Album "Promise" ===
Recorded by Eminence in 2009 and released by CoMix Wave Films, this CD features adaptations of music composed by Tenmon for the four animated films directed to date by Makoto Shinkai. It includes three songs from 5 Centimeters Per Second (including an instrumental version of "One More Time, One More Chance" by Masayoshi Yamazaki), six songs from The Place Promised in Our Early Days, two songs from Voices of a Distant Star, and two songs from She and Her Cat.

=== The Disappearance of Haruhi Suzumiya ===
In 2009, Eminence recorded the soundtrack to the anime film The Disappearance of Haruhi Suzumiya.
