= Say It's Forever =

Studio album by Miz
- Released: September 22, 2004
- Genre: J-Pop, J-Rock
- Label: Victor Entertainment
- Producer: Tord Backstrom

Miz chronology
Story Untold (2004)	Say It's Forever (2004)	Dreams (2005)

Miz's first Japanese album, Say It's Forever, contains her first two Japanese singles—a-sides and b-sides—as Miz, New Day and Waiting For. If You Run was used as an ending theme for the docchi no ryouri SHOW. It peaked at number 20 on Oricon Albums Chart.

== Track listing ==
1. "New Day"
2. "Waiting For"
3. "What's Going On"
4. "If You Run"
5. "Interlude"
6. "Confusion"
7. "Dreams"
8. "Not You"
9. "Say It's Forever"
10. "Circles"
11. ""What's It to You?!""
12. "In The Dark"
13. "Got It"

=== Swedish Diary DVD ===
1. New Day (Video clip)
2. Waiting For (Video clip)
3. at Gotland (Slideshow)
4. at Stockholm (Slideshow)
