= SKY Perfect Well Think =

Japanese mass media company

SKY Perfect Well Think, Co. Ltd. (株式会社スカパー・ウェルシンク, Kabushiki-gaisha Sukapā Werushinku) is a Japanese content production and development enterprise, owned by SKY Perfect Communications, established on July 29, 2004. It is involved in the production, development and distribution of several feature films, anime series, television programs and numerous other media. It is presided by Jun'ichi Watanabe, and headquartered in Tokyo, Japan.

== Productions ==
=== Anime ===
- Witchblade
- Kamisama Kazoku
- Gyagu Manga Biyori
- Ginga Densetsu Weed
- Jigoku Shōjo
- Jyu Oh Sei
- Bokura ga Ita
- Mamotte! Lollipop
- Mushishi
- Hataraki Man
- Nodame Cantabile
- Blue Dragon
- Deltora Quest
- Re-Born
- Terra e...
- Damekko Dōbutsu
- Romeo x Juliet

=== Films ===
- Hang Ryū Cinema Festival
- Ichiban Kirei na Mizu
- Koala Kachō
- Kōshōnin: Mashita Masayoshi (a.k.a. The Negotiator)
- Kokkuri-san
- Saishū Heiki Kanojo
- Tenshi no Tamago
- Tokyo Friends the Movie
- Transamerica
- Black Jack: Futari no Kuroi Isha
- Brave Story
- Yawarakai Seikatsu
- Yōgisha: Muroi Shinji (a.k.a. The Suspect)
- Sim Sons
- Prince of Tennis
- Mizuchi
- Seishun Manga: Bokura no Renai Scenario
- Oyayubi Sagashi
- Deguchi no Nai Umi
- Duradeka
- Tada-kun wo Aishiteru
- Niji no Megami (a.k.a. Rainbow Song)
- 36 Quai des Orfèvres (as Aruiwa Uragiri Toiuna no Inu)
- Meiken Lassie
- Shikyū no Kioku'
- Suteki na Yoru, Boku ni Kudasai
- Ashita no Watashi no Tsukurikata
- Taitei no Ken
- Some Kind of Wonderful (as Koishikute)
- Gegege no Onitarō
- Shaberedomo Shaberedomo
- Ahiru to Kamo no Koinrokkā
- Burijji
- Kappa no Kū to Natsuyasumi
- Litre DJ
- Heat Island
- Jigyaku no Uta
- Kurōbi

=== Drama ===
- Astro Kyūdan

=== Magazines ===
- World Soccer King
