= Romeo × Juliet =

Japanese anime television series

- Cover art of the first Japanese DVD volume, featuring the anime's title characters

ロミオ×ジュリエット (Romio to Jurietto)
- Genre: Romance
- Created by: William Shakespeare
- Anime television series
- Directed by: Fumitoshi Oizaki
- Produced by: Daisuke Gomi; Yoshihiro Iwasa; Tsutomu Kojima
- Written by: Reiko Yoshida
- Music by: Hitoshi Sakimoto
- Studio: Gonzo
- Licensed by: Crunchyroll (Note: In North America through Crunchyroll, LLC (formerly known as Funimation).); AUS: Madman Entertainment; UK: MVM Films
- Original network: CBC, TBS, KBS Kyōto, SUN-TV
- English network: SEA: Animax Asia
- Original run: April 4, 2007 – September 26, 2007
- Episodes: 24
- Manga
- Written by: Reiko Yoshida
- Illustrated by: Hiroki Harada
- Published by: Kadokawa Shoten
- English publisher: NA: Yen Press
- Magazine: Monthly Asuka
- Original run: 2007 – 2009
- Volumes: 2

Romeo × Juliet (ロミオ×ジュリエット, Romio to Jurietto) is a Japanese anime television series, loosely based on William Shakespeare's classical play, Romeo and Juliet, along with numerous references and characters from other Shakespearean plays. Though the anime borrows mostly from Shakespeare's story, the manga adaptation differs extensively from the original. Romeo × Juliet was broadcast in Japan on Chubu-Nippon from April to September 2007.

== Plot ==
On the floating island of Neo Verona, Leontes Montague and his men lead a bloody coup d'état and murder all the members of ruling House Capulet. Only Lord Capulet's young daughter, Juliet, is able to escape. Fourteen years later, Leontes rules the land with an iron fist and crushes anyone who opposes him. Juliet, now sixteen, fights against House Montague's oppression as the masked vigilante "The Red Whirlwind". While attending the Rose Ball hosted by the Montagues with a friend, Juliet meets Romeo, Prince Montague's son, and both of them fall deeply in love at first sight.

Romeo is a kind, caring, selfless and humble man who is opposed to his father's cruelty and tyranny, and shares many ideals with Juliet. However, Capulet loyalists are planning a rebellion to overthrow House Montague, while Leontes is obsessed with destroying the threat of the House of Capulet permanently. As these starcrossed lovers face many challenges and adventures together, which will strengthen and deepen their true unwavering romantic love even further, an ancient secret hidden deep within Neo Verona is slowly revealed.

== Media ==
=== Anime ===
Romeo × Juliet was broadcast in Japan on Chubu-Nippon Broadcasting from April 4 to September 26, 2007. It was later broadcast by other Japanese television networks such as TBS, KBS Kyōto and SUN-TV. It was broadcast in Hungary, Romania, Czech Republic and Slovakia by Animax and in Italy by Rai 4 on October 3, 2009. The 24-episodes anime was produced by Gonzo and SKY Perfect Well Think. It was directed by Fumitoshi Oizaki. The chief screenwriter for the series was Reiko Yoshida. The music was composed by Hitoshi Sakimoto and performed by Eminence Symphony Orchestra with Tomohiro Yoshida as sound director. The series used three pieces of theme music. The opening theme was "You Raise Me Up" (祈り〜You Raise Me Up〜) covered by Lena Park. "Cyclone" (サイクロン)) by 12012 was the ending theme for the first 14 episodes. "Good Bye, Yesterday" by Mizrock was the ending theme for episodes 15 to 23. "Inori~You Raise Me Up〜 (English version)" by Lena Park was used as a special ending for episode 24. The anime is licensed in North America by Funimation. The complete North American series was released in two sets, with the first half of the series, the Romeo Collection, released on June 23, 2009, and the second half of the series, the Juliet Collection, released on August 11, 2009.

=== Manga ===
Romeo × Juliet was also adapted into a manga series, serialized in Kadokawa Shoten's Monthly Asuka shōjo magazine since March 24, 2007. The manga is licensed in North America by Yen Press and was released in July 2010.

=== Radio ===
An internet radio series, entitled RomeJuli × Radio (ロミジュリ×レイディオ, Romijuri × Reidio), has been streaming on Cospa's internet radio channel Onsen since April 13, 2007. It is hosted by the voice actress of Juliet, Fumie Mizusawa.

=== Soundtrack ===
The original soundtrack for Romeo × Juliet was released on February 27, 2008, and bears the catalog number of COCX-34784. It contains Hitoshi Sakimoto's music score, as well as the opening and closing songs for the anime.

== Reception ==
Theron Martin, of Anime News Network reviewed the first DVD set, and enjoyed the musical score, but felt the story made use of too many 'saved-at-the-last-moment' scenes. He noted a drop-off in animation quality in the second half of the series, and was disappointed at the change in the tone of the ending. He later chose it as one of the best anime series of 2009, citing Gonzo's preservation of the overall tone, and the addition of "great action" scenes. Bamboo Dong described it as "absolutely wonderful, both aesthetically and also narratively", and praised the reinvention of the tale.

Todd Douglass Jr. described it as "the characters, animation, and story all come together for one heck of an experience", and felt that the love story did not become "too cheesy". He cautioned that the series' divergence from its source and the fantasy elements involved may make the series not ideal for everyone, but that overall it was a "great series". Chris Beveridge of Mania noted the addition of characters from Shakespeare's other plays "may either please or annoy the hardcore fans", but enjoyed the adaptation, although he noted it was not particularly "revolutionary or challenging". He later noted that in the first volume, the use of the fantasy setting was understated but was used more in the second part of the series and enjoyed the "focused" narrative, which he attributes to the "energy and enthusiasm" of the young production team. Daryl Loomis of DVD Verdict enjoyed the balance between the romance narrative and the action narratives in the first part, describing it as "breezy fare".

He later sums it up by saying, "in spite of its many little faults, it is good, angst-y teenage fun", and that it "doesn't set the world on fire, but there's quite a bit to like about this series". He felt the "wild, logic-defying climax" added to the series, making it feel "less contrived". Holly Ellingwood of ActiveAnime felt the choice of opening and closing songs was "unusual", as one was an already-existing song, and the other was a rock song which she felt contrasted with the mood and overall score of the anime. She also praised the English adaptation as it incorporated an older style of language and many more Shakespearean quotes than the Japanese language voice track.
