= Krzysztof Malek =

Polish pianist

Christopher Malek
- Born: Stalowa Wola, Poland
- Occupation: Concert pianist
- Website: www.christophermalek.com

Christopher Malek is a Polish-born concert pianist originally from Stalowa Wola, Poland, currently residing in Sydney, Australia. He is best known for his performances of music of the romantic period especially Chopin and Liszt.

== Biography ==
Christopher Malek is a Polish-born pianist currently residing in Sydney, Australia. He has graduated with highest distinction for extraordinary artistic achievements from a special talents school- Z. Brzewski State Music High School in Warsaw. He had studied with Teresa Manasterska at the Fryderyk Chopin Academy of Music in Warsaw, on full scholarship with Professor Victor Makarov (student of Regina Horowitz, sister of Vladimir Horowitz) in Sydney and Lee Kum-Sing (student of Julius Katchen and Magda Tagliaferro) at the Vancouver Academy of Music.

Christopher is a prizewinner at a number of national and international competitions. At an early age of ten he won his first national contest which was soon followed by his debut with an orchestra. In 1997 he was a prizewinner at the National Paderewski Competition, in 1999 he received the Second Prize at the International Chopin Competition in Vilnius and in 2001 he won the First Prize at the International Bacewicz Competition in Lodz. In 2007 he was awarded First Prize and gold medal at the Chopin competition in Sydney.

=== Concert touring ===
Since his successes in piano competitions Christopher continues to travel and perform around the world. So far music has taken him to over thirty countries in Europe, North America, Asia and Australia. He has made a number of archive recordings for radio and television in several countries and has also played the main role of Frederic in a film about Chopin.

In recognition of his achievements he was awarded a prestigious prize-scholarship by the Polish Ministry of Culture. In 2008 Christopher received a Distinguished Talent Permanent Residency of Australia.
