= Mizrock =

Studio album by Miz
- Released: 22 February 2006
- Genre: J-rock, J-pop
- Label: Victor Entertainment
- Producer: Tord Backstrom

Miz chronology
Say It's Forever (2005)	Mizrock (2006)

Mizrock is Miz's second Japanese album and contains the A-sides and B-sides to the last three singles before it: "In the Sky", "Backseat Baby", and "Bittersweet". This album revolves more around rock (hence the name Mizrock) and jerkier tunes. The English version of "New Day" (bonus track on the limited edition) is the same as the one in Dreams. The English version of the track "In the Sky", previously known as "Amazing", was used in the Square-Enix game Grandia III. The album peaked at number 35 on the Oricon Albums Chart.

== Track listing ==
1. "Bittersweet"
2. "Eyes Don't Lie"
3. "In the Sky"
4. "Backseat Baby"
5. "An Ordinary Day"
6. "What Difference"
7. "Dreamer"
8. "Give It All Away"
9. "In the Rain"
10. "Yesterday"
11. "Part of My Balance"
12. "Welcome to Our Party"
13. "In My Life"

=== Bonus tracks ===
1. "New Day" - English version
2. "In The Sky" - English version

=== Limited Edition DVD ===
1. Backseat Baby (music clip)
2. Bittersweet" (music clip)
3. Bittersweet making of
4. Bittersweet + Mizrock photo session
