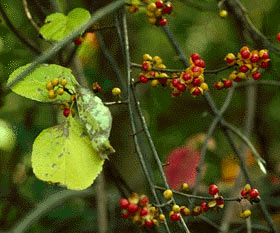

Scientific classification
- Kingdom: Plantae
- Clade: Embryophytes
- Clade: Tracheophytes
- Clade: Angiosperms
- Clade: Eudicots
- Clade: Rosids
- Order: Celastrales
- Family: Celastraceae
- Genus: Celastrus
- Species: C. orbiculatus

Binomial name
- Celastrus orbiculatus Thunb.

= Celastrus orbiculatus =

Oriental bittersweet

Species of plant

Celastrus orbiculatus is a woody vine of the family Celastraceae. It is commonly called Oriental bittersweet, as well as Chinese bittersweet, Asian bittersweet, round-leaved bittersweet, and Asiatic bittersweet.

It is native to China, where it is the most widely distributed Celastrus species, and to Japan and Korea. It was introduced into North America in 1879, and is considered to be an invasive species in eastern North America. It closely resembles the native North American species, Celastrus scandens, with which it will readily hybridize.

== Description ==
The defining characteristic of the deciduous plant is its vines: they are thin, spindly, and have silver to reddish brown bark. They are generally between 1 and 4 cm (0.4 and 1.6 in) in diameter. However, if growth is not disturbed, vines can exceed 10 cm (3.9 in) and when cut, will show age rings that can exceed 20 years.

When Celastrus orbiculatus grows by itself, it forms thickets; when it is near a tree the vines twist themselves around the trunk as high as 40 ft (12 m). The encircling vines have been known to strangle the host tree to death or break branches from the excess weight, which is also true of the slower-growing American species, C. scandens. The leaves are round and glossy, 2–12 cm (0.8–4.7 in) long, have toothed margins and grow in alternate patterns along the vines.

Small green flowers are borne on axillary cymes. The fruit is a three-valved capsule, which dehisces to reveal bright red arils that cover the seeds. All parts of the plant are poisonous.

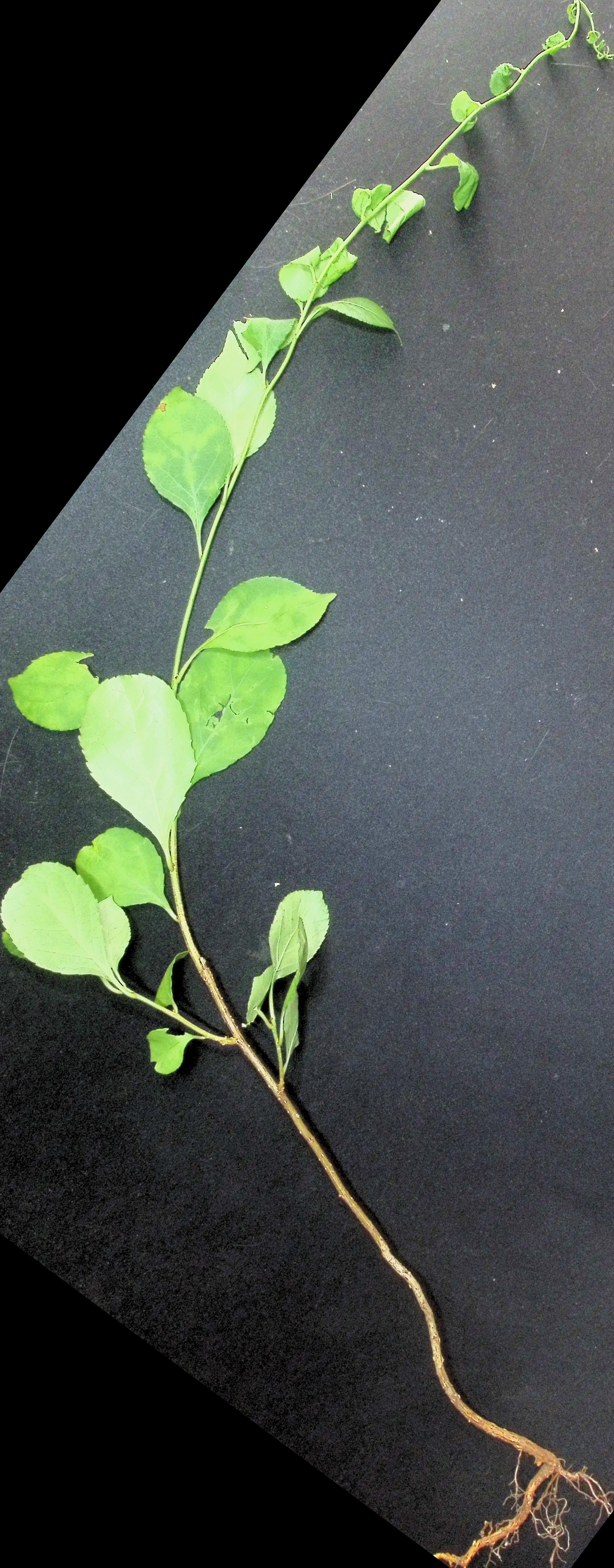
An example of a full C. orbiculatus plant

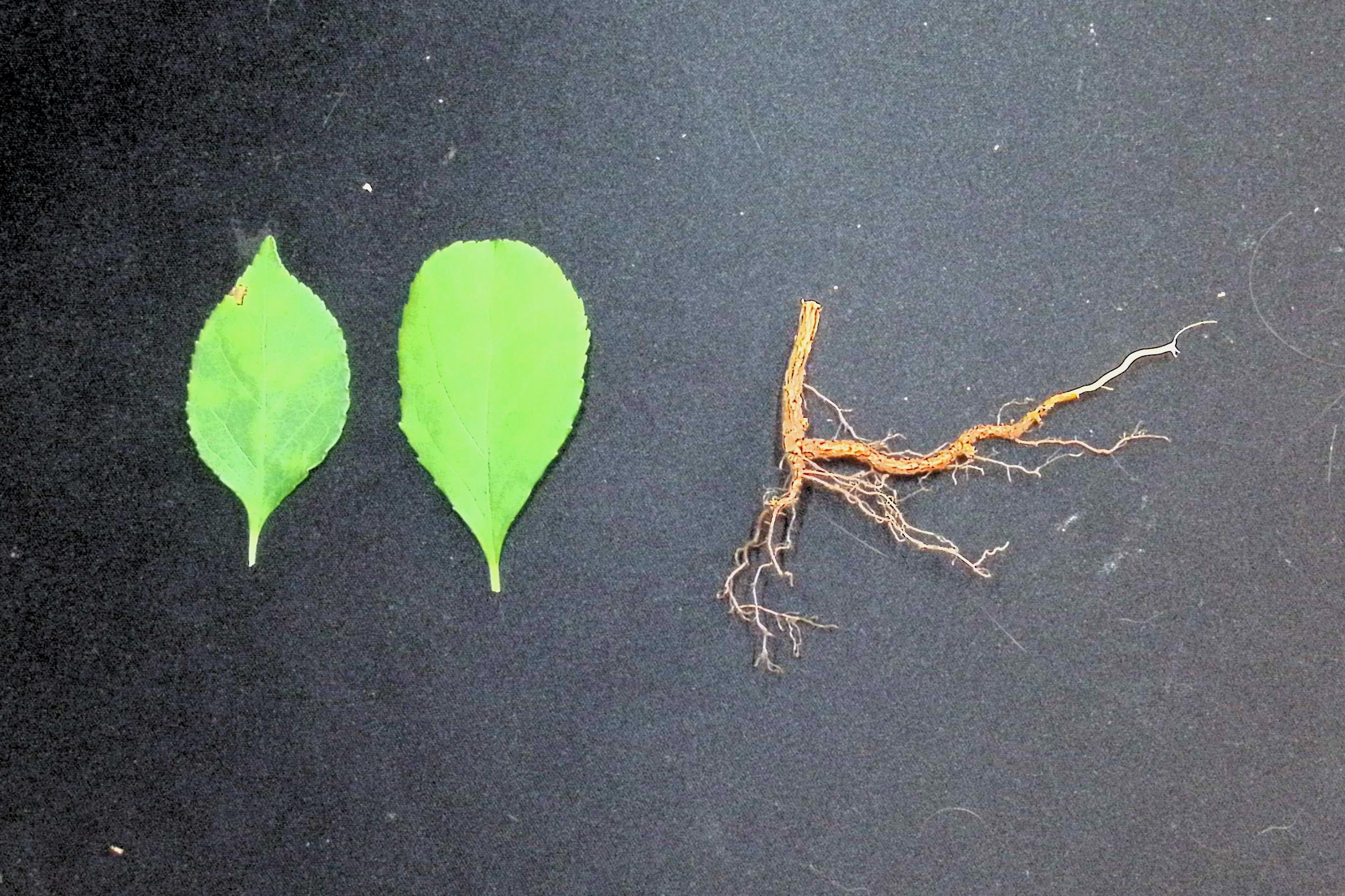
Leaf shapes and root of the plant

== Range and habitat ==
Due to systematic disturbances to eastern forests for wood production and recreation, Oriental bittersweet has naturalized to landscapes, roadsides, and woodlands of eastern North America. In the United States, it can be found as far south as Louisiana, as far north as Maine, and as far west as the Rocky Mountains. It prefers mesic woods, where it has been known to eclipse native plants.

== Cultivation ==
Celastrus orbiculatus is cultivated as an ornamental plant. In the UK, it has gained the Royal Horticultural Society's Award of Garden Merit.

== As an invasive species ==
Oriental bittersweet is a strong competitor, and its dispersal has endangered the survival of several native species. One attribute that contributes to its success is its attractively colored fruit. As a result, mammals and birds eat the fruit and disperse the seeds in their droppings.

Its introduction into new areas threatens the local flora by imposing a strong competitor on native plants. The species is native to Eastern Asia, but was introduced to the US for aesthetic purposes. It has been used in floral arrangements; improper disposal has allowed the plant to become established in more than 33 states from Georgia to Wisconsin and in parts of the Appalachians. The organism grows primarily along the edges of densely vegetated areas, giving it ready access to light and other resources. Oriental bittersweet's ability to grow in a variety of environments has proven detrimental to many plant species along the Appalachian mountains; the species continues to expand westward.

This map shows the identified locations of the Oriental bittersweet as of 2012 (provided by the United States Department of Agriculture).

Oriental bittersweet employs multiple invasive and dispersal strategies that allow it to outcompete surrounding plants in non-native regions, making management difficult. The plant's invasion has created diverse ecological, managerial, and agricultural complications, making it a focus of environmental conservation efforts.

In the European Union, it is included in the list of invasive alien species of Union concern and hence cannot be imported, bred, transported, commercialized, or intentionally released into the environment in any of its member states.

=== Response to abiotic factors ===
Sunlight is one of the most vital resources for Oriental bittersweet. As demonstrated by controlled experiments, Oriental bittersweet grows more rapidly in environments that receive a higher amount of sunlight. In a study in which populations received more than 28% full sunlight, it exhibited a higher amount of growth and biomass. This study used layers of woven cloth to control the percentage of available sunlight. In this experiment, the total living length (TLL, the living length of stems on each plant) increased when Oriental bittersweet was exposed to higher amounts of sunlight. When exposed to 2% sunlight, the TLL ratio decreased. Oriental bittersweet can increase in biomass by 20% when exposed to 28% sunlight rather than 2%. The plant's strong response to sunlight parallels its role as an invasive species, as it can outcompete other species by fighting for and receiving more sunlight. Although growth ratios decreased when Oriental bittersweet is exposed to 2% sunlight (due to a decrease in photosynthetic ability), it still exhibited a 90% survival rate. Experimental data have indicated that Oriental bittersweet has a strong ability to tolerate low light conditions "ranging on average from 0.8 to 6.4% transmittance". In comparison to its congener American bittersweet, when placed in habitats with little light, Oriental bittersweet was found to have increased height, increased aboveground biomass, and increased total leaf mass. Oriental bittersweet, in comparison to many other competing species, is the better competitor in attaining sunlight.

Temperature is another variable that plays a role in Oriental bittersweet's growth and development as an invasive species. Unlike other invasive species, high summer temperatures have been shown to inhibit plant growth. Oriental bittersweet has also been shown to establish more readily in habitats experiencing high annual precipitation. This is noteworthy as it contrasts sharply with other common invasive species such as Berberis thunbergii and Euonymus alatus which have been shown to have a decreased probability of establishment when placed in environments experiencing high annual precipitation.

Compared to other invasive species analyzed in a recent study, Oriental bittersweet was more prevalent in landscapes dominated by developed areas. Open and abandoned habitats were also found to positively influence the spread of the plant compared to other invasive species. Additionally the species is heavily favored in edge habitats. This ability to live in various environmental conditions raises the concern of the plant's dispersal.

=== Biotic interactions ===
==== Mutualistic interactions ====
A determining factor regarding Oriental bittersweet's ability to outcompete native plant species is its ability to form mutualistic associations with mycorrhizal fungi, specifically arbuscular mycorrhizal fungi. Oriental bittersweet growth is highly dependent on the absorption of phosphorus. In a recent study, growth was found to be greater when arbuscular mycorrhizal fungi were present in soil with low phosphorus concentrations, compared to when the plant was placed in an environment with high soil phosphorus concentrations with no arbuscular mycorrhizal fungi were present. The results from this study show the importance of symbiotic relationships in allowing Oriental bittersweet to effectively uptake nutrients from its surroundings. Additionally, the symbiotic relationship with mycorrhizae allows this invasive species to utilize less of its energy in root biomass to absorb necessary nutrients. This may be crucial in allowing Oriental bittersweet to act as an effective invasive species as it is able to allocate more energy to its aboveground biomass instead of its belowground biomass. This is significant because the plant's invasiveness depends heavily on photosynthetic ability and reproductive capacity. The symbiotic relationship established with fungi only occurs with arbuscular mycorrhizal fungi, while no such relationship has been observed with ectomycorrhizal fungi. These studies have shown that suitable mycorrhizae are a strong determining factor regarding whether a plant can survive in its environment. Studies have also shown evidence that "introduced plant species can modify microbial communities in the soil surrounding not only their own roots, but also the roots of neighboring plants, thereby altering competitive interactions among the plant species". This may be a key invasive trait for Oriental bittersweet, as it allows the plant to negatively affect surrounding plant life by altering their underground symbiotic microbial relationships. However, further experimentation is necessary to determine whether this organism employs this trait as an invasive strategy.

Spotted lanternflies, another species invasive to the United States, use Oriental bittersweet as a host plant.

==== Competitive interactions ====
One of Oriental bittersweet's invasive characteristics is its effective utilization of energy to increase plant height, thus giving it a competitive advantage over similar plants. A study conducted in 2006 showed that, in comparison to its congener American bittersweet, Oriental bittersweet had increased height, increased aboveground biomass, and increased total leaf mass. This is not to say that Oriental bittersweet outperformed American bittersweet in all criteria: in comparison to Oriental bittersweet, "American bittersweet had increased stem diameter, single leaf area, and leaf mass to stem mass ratio", suggesting that American bittersweet focused growth on different portions of the plant rather than plant characteristics emphasized by Oriental bittersweet such as stem length. This is significant as height plays a major role in allowing Oriental bittersweet to outcompete surrounding vegetation. Focusing growth on stem length allows it to be in a strong position to absorb light, while also negatively impacting surrounding plant life by creating shaded conditions.

The species' vine-like morphology has also been shown to have negative effects on surrounding plant life. For example, evidence suggests that this morphological characteristic facilitates its ability to girdle nearby trees, creating an overall negative effect on the trees such as making them more susceptible to ice damage or damaging branches due to the weight of the plant. Additionally, one study observed that the Oriental bittersweet is capable of siphoning away nutrients from surrounding plants. The study found this to occur in a variety of environments, suggestive of both the plant's increased relative plasticity as well as increased nutrient uptake.

One study observed that the presence of Oriental bittersweet increases the alkalinity of the surrounding soil, a characteristic of many successful invasive plant species. This alters the availability of essential nutrients and hinders the nutrient uptake ability of native plants. Though the relationship between Oriental bittersweet and the alkalinity of the soil is consistent, there are a number of proposed mechanisms for this observation. The plant's significant above-ground biomass demands the preferential uptake of nitrate over ammonia, leading to soil nitrification. It also has a high cation-exchange capacity, which also supports the larger biomass. Either of these functions could explain the increased alkalinity, but further experimentation is needed to pinpoint the exact mechanism.

==== Hybridization ====
Another major threat posed by Oriental bittersweet is hybridization with American bittersweet. Hybridization occurs readily between American bittersweet females and Oriental bittersweet males, though the opposite is known to occur to a lesser extent. The resulting hybrid species is fully capable of reproduction. In theory, if the Oriental bittersweet invasion continues to worsen, widespread hybridization could genetically disrupt the entire American bittersweet population, possibly rendering it extinct.

== Management ==
To minimize the effects of Oriental bittersweet's invasion into North American habitats, its growth and dispersal must be tightly managed. Early detection is essential for successful conservation efforts. To reduce further growth and dispersal, above-ground vegetation is cut and any foliage is sprayed with triclopyr, a common herbicide. Glyphosate is another chemical method of control. These two herbicides are usually sprayed directly on the plants in late fall to prevent other plants from being targeted. These steps must be repeated annually, or whenever regrowth is observed. Triclopyr is non-toxic to most animal and insect species and slightly toxic to some species of fish, but it has a half-life of less than a day in water, making it safe and effective for field use. Mechanical methods have also been used, but they are not as effective due to the difficulty of completely removing the root. There is also no biological control agent available in helping control this species. Mechanical and chemical methods are being used, but they are only temporarily fixing the situation.

== Phytochemicals ==
Bicelaphanol A is a neuroprotective dimeric-trinorditerpene isolated from the bark of Celastrus orbiculatus.

== Uses ==
Despite the modest toxicity of its fruit, some livestock browse on the leaves without effect. Its vines, which are durable and tough, are a good source of weaving material for baskets. The fibrous inner bark can be used to make strong cordage.
