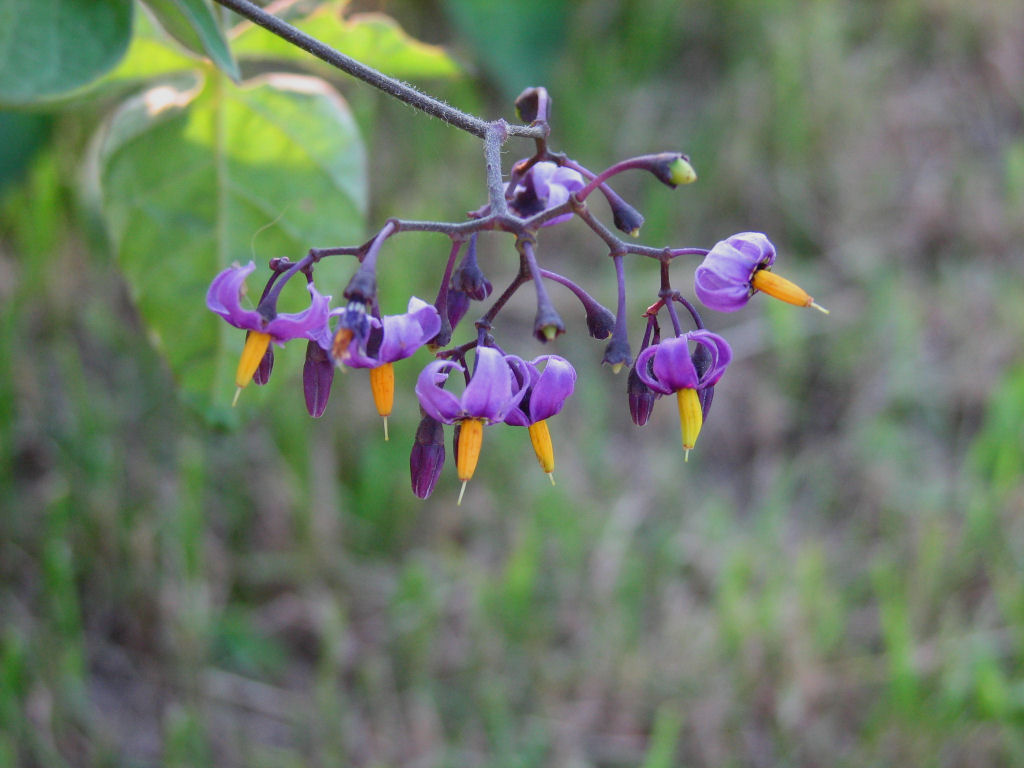
- Flowers
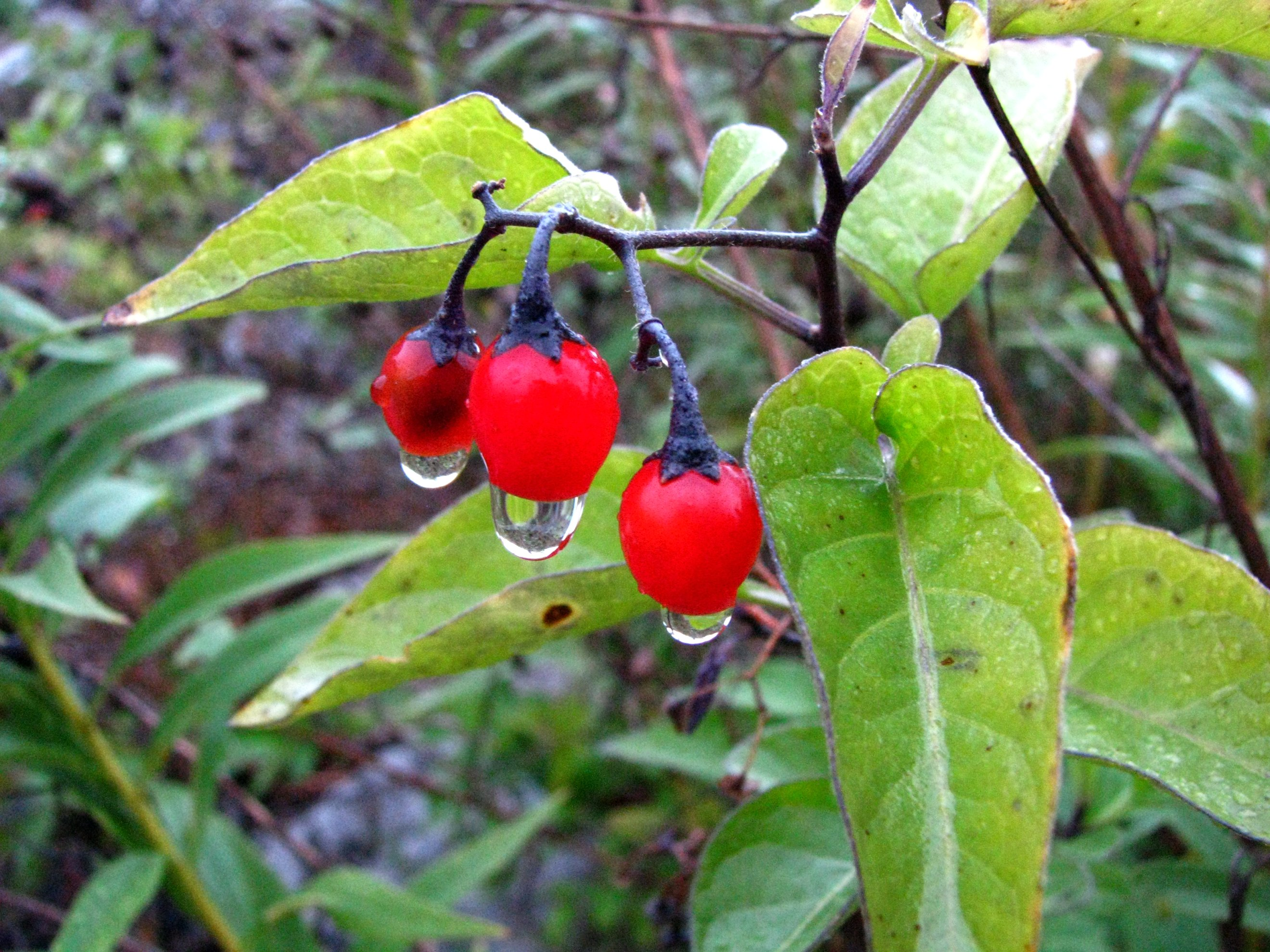
- Fruit

Scientific classification
- Kingdom: Plantae
- Clade: Tracheophytes
- Clade: Angiosperms
- Clade: Eudicots
- Clade: Asterids
- Order: Solanales
- Family: Solanaceae
- Genus: Solanum
- Species: S. dulcamara

Binomial name
- Solanum dulcamara L.
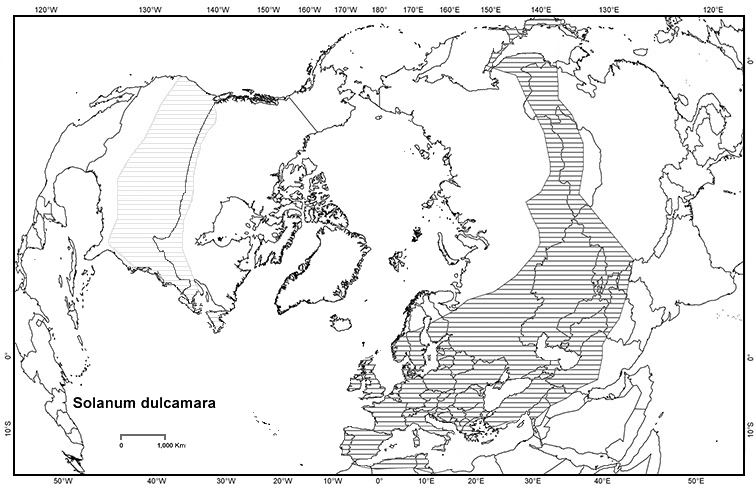
- Native (dark hatch) and exotic (pale hatch) distribution

= Solanum dulcamara =

Bittersweet nightshade

Species of plant

Solanum dulcamara is a species of vine in the genus Solanum (which also includes the potato and the tomato) of the family Solanaceae. Common names include bittersweet, bittersweet nightshade, bitter nightshade, blue bindweed, Amara Dulcis, climbing nightshade, felonwort, fellenwort, felonwood, poisonberry, poisonflower, scarlet berry, snakeberry, trailing bittersweet, trailing nightshade, violet bloom, and woody nightshade.

It is native to the Old World and widely naturalised elsewhere, including North America, with a preference for wetlands.

== Description ==
Solanum dulcamara is a semi-woody herbaceous perennial vine, which scrambles over other plants, capable of reaching a height of 4 metres (13 feet) where suitable support is available, but more often 1–2 m (3 1/2–6 1/2 ft) high. The leaves are 4–12 centimetres (1 1/2–4 1/2 inches) long, roughly arrowhead-shaped, and often lobed at the base.

It has a long flowering season lasting from May through November. The flowers are in loose clusters of 3–20, 1–1.5 cm (3/8–5/8 in) across, star-shaped, with five purple petals and yellow stamens and style pointing forward. The fruit is an ovoid red berry about 1 cm long, soft and juicy, with the aspect and odour of a tiny tomato. The fruit persists for an average of 19.5 days, and bears an average of 17.9 seeds per fruit. The fruits average 84.1% water.

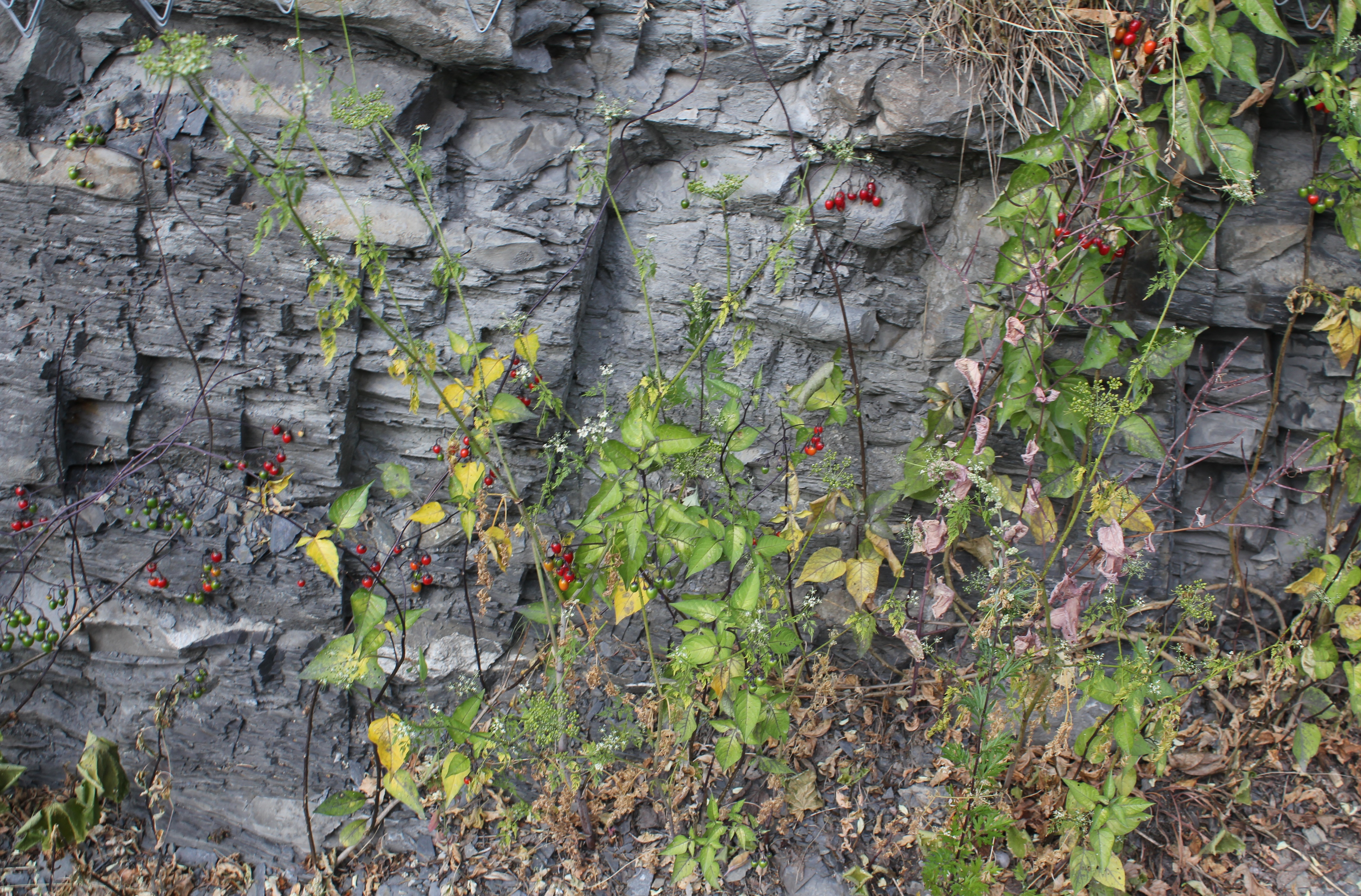
Foliage

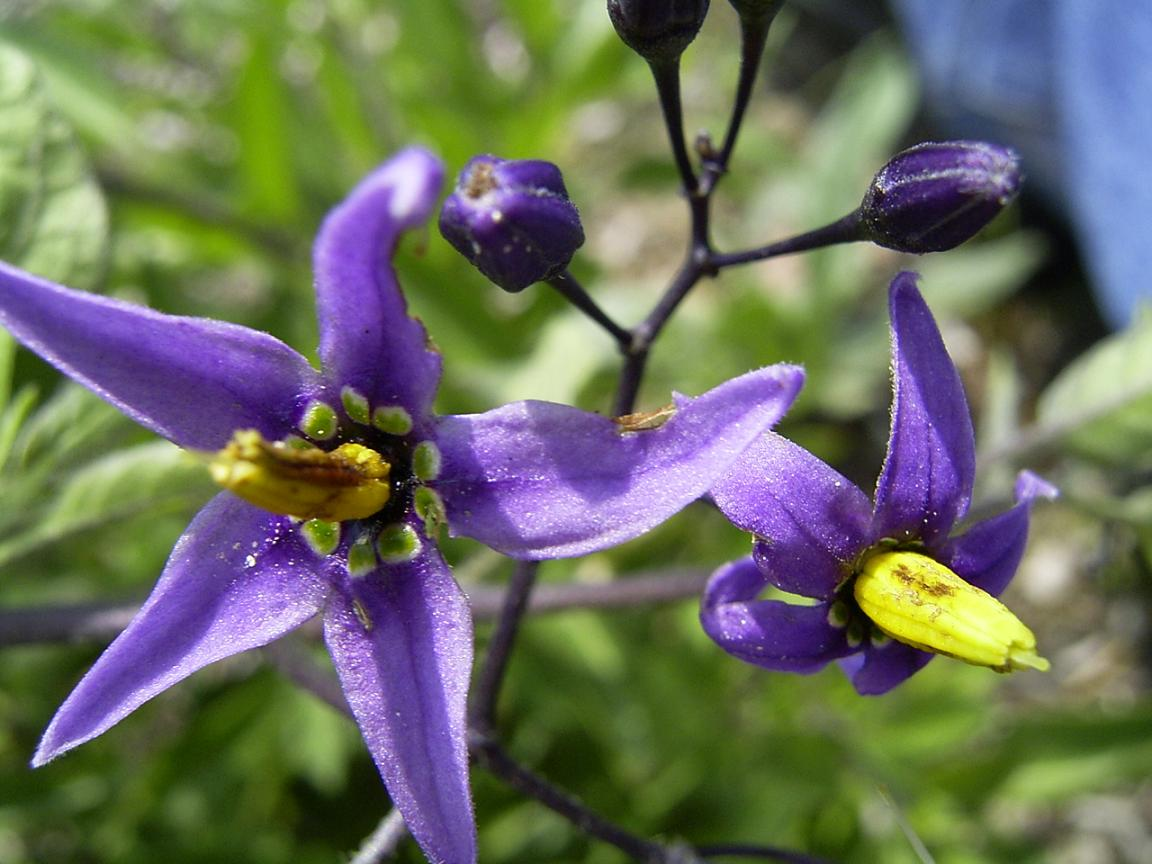
Flowers close-up

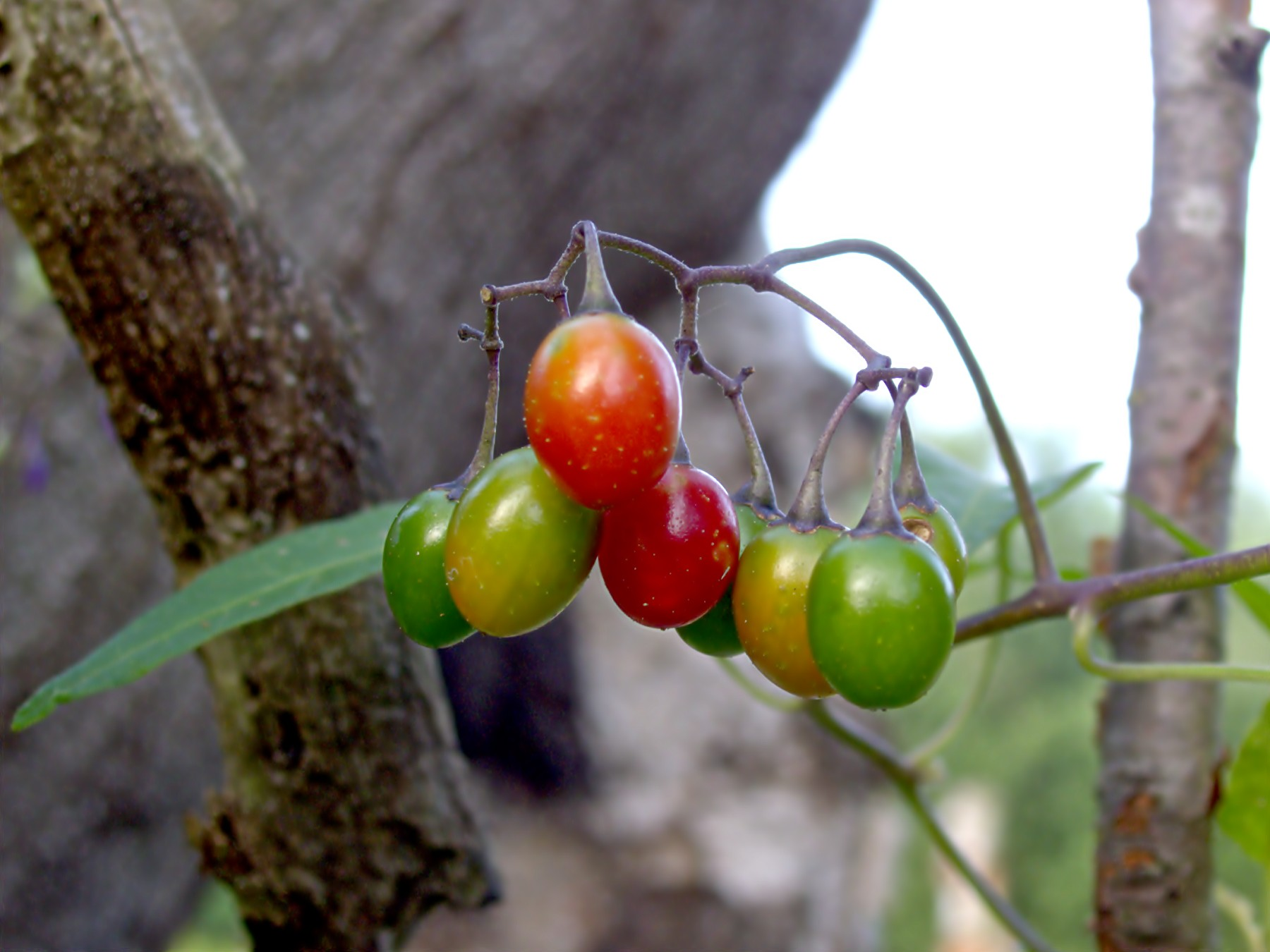
Fruits

== Distribution and habitat ==
It is native to Europe, eastern Asia, and northern Africa, but has spread throughout the world. It is a nonnative species in the United States.

It grows in all types of terrain with a preference for wetlands and the understory of riparian forests. It can occur in woodlands, scrubland, hedges and marshes.

== Ecology ==
The plant is relatively important in the diet of some species of birds such as European thrushes, which feed on its fruits, being immune to its poisons, and scatter the seeds abroad.

Along with other climbers, it creates a dark and impenetrable shelter for various animals.

== Cultivation ==
The plant grows well in dark areas in places where it can receive the light of morning or afternoon. An area receiving bright light for many hours reduces its development. It grows more easily in rich wet soils with plenty of nitrogen. When grown for medicinal purposes, it is best grown in a dry, exposed environment.

== Toxicity ==
Flowers and fruit, in Virginia

The berry is poisonous to humans and livestock, and the berry's attractive and familiar look makes it dangerous for children. The poison in this species is believed to be solanine.

This plant is one of the less poisonous members of the Solanaceae. Instances of poisoning in humans are very rare on account of the fruit's intensely bitter taste. The fruit has been reported to have a sweet aftertaste, hence the vernacular name bittersweet.

== Medicinal uses ==
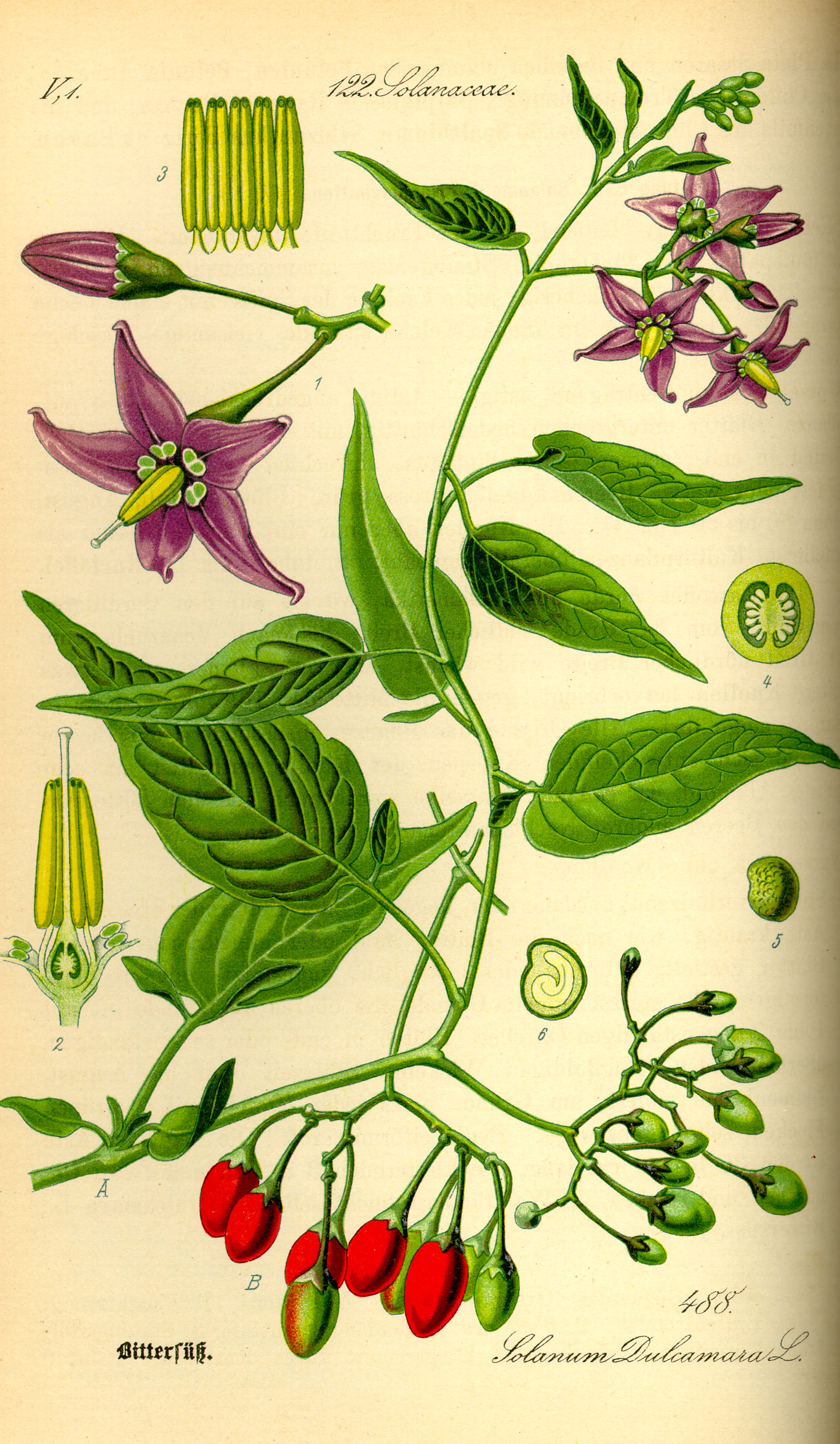
1885 Illustration by Kurt Stüber

Solanum dulcamara has a variety of documented medicinal uses, all of which are advised to be approached with proper caution as the entirety of the plant is considered to be poisonous. Always seek advice from a professional before using a plant medicinally. There have only been records of medicinal use for adults (not children) and it is possible to be allergic to S. dulcamara; medicinal use is not advised in these cases.

The alkaloids, solanine (from unripe fruits), solasodine (from flowers) and beta-solamarine (from roots) have been found to inhibit the growth of E. coli and S. aureus. Solanine and solasodine extracted from S. dulcamara showed antidermatophytic activity against Chrysosporium indicum, Trichophyton mentagrophytes and T. simil, thus it may cure ringworm.

Indigenous people of North America used the roots for relief of fever and nausea.

The stem is believed to be considerably less poisonous than the rest of the plant, and it has mostly been used in treatment for conditions of the skin. There are records of it being used to treat mild recurrent eczema, psoriasis, scabies, and dermatomycosis. It is approved by the German Commission E for external use as supportive therapy in chronic eczema. The stem has also been used in treatment for bronchitis, asthma, and pneumonia.

The stems are generally harvested when they do not yet have leaves (or they have already fallen) and are shredded into small pieces. They are mostly known to be applied in the form of liquid onto the skin. Infusing it into a drink is also possible, but not recommended.

The leaves have been known to treat warts and tumors, while the fruit can treat conditions of the respiratory tract and joints.

=== History ===
Solanum dulcamara has been valued by herbalists since ancient Greek times. In the Middle Ages the plant was thought to be effective against witchcraft, and was sometimes hung around the neck of cattle to protect them from the "evil eye". It has been suggested that the plant was used both medicinally and to induce altered states of mind in Anglo-Saxon England. The monk and scholar Aldhelm of Malmesbury (c. 639–709) included a riddle about this plant in his Epistola ad Acircium, describing its effects as inflicting a "touch of insanity" upon the user, leaving them "mad with dizziness". An eleventh-century herbarium also records the name "madness-berry" for this plant (wedeberge).

John Gerard's Herball (1597) states that "the juice is good for those that have fallen from high places, and have been thereby bruised or beaten, for it is thought to dissolve blood congealed or cluttered anywhere in the intrals and to heale the hurt places."

== Symbolism ==
Solanum dulcamara has been used as a symbol of fidelity. This is in reference to its curious property of combining extreme bitterness with surprising sweetness – hence its common name "bittersweet". This symbolism is seen in Christian art from the Middle Ages as well as in bridal wreaths.
