= Kiss in the Dark (novel) =

Japanese yaoi light novel series

- Cover of the light novel

パパと♥KISS IN THE DARK (Papa to Kiss in the Dark)
- Genre: Comedy yaoi incest
- Light novel
- Written by: Ken Nanbara
- Illustrated by: Sae Momoki
- Published by: Hakusensha
- Imprint: Hakusensha Hanamaru Bunko
- Original run: April 1999 – September 2006
- Volumes: 6
- Original video animation
- Directed by: Asumi Matsumura
- Produced by: Tomoko Ohno; Yoko Maki
- Written by: Yumi Kageyama
- Music by: CORNEA
- Studio: TNK
- Licensed by: NA: Kitty Media
- Released: November 23, 2005 – December 21, 2005
- Runtime: 26 minutes
- Episodes: 2

Kiss in the Dark (パパと♥KISS IN THE DARK, Papa to Kiss in the Dark; lit. "Kiss in the Dark With Papa") is a four-volume Japanese yaoi light novel written by Ken Nanbara and illustrated by Sae Momoki. It has been adapted into an anime OVA series animated by TNK. Several drama CDs also based on this light novel have been released.

In June 2008, the anime was licensed for release in English by Media Blasters under their Kitty Media label.

== Plot ==
Mira Munakata is a first-year high school student involved in a romantic and sexual relationship with his father, a famous actor named Kyōsuke Munakata. When Kyōsuke begins acting strangely, Mira suspects that he is cheating on him. After finding his adoption papers, Mira discovers that he and Kyōsuke may not be related at all, and he believes that Kyōsuke will eventually leave him for Mitsuki, an actress that Kyōsuke is rumored to be in a relationship with. In the midst of this, Mira deals with romantic advances from his childhood friend, Kazuki, and a third-year student from his high school, Takayuki, both of whom are in love with him. Each book in the light novel series introduces a new partner to Mira including his uncle's cousin Munakata Ryousuke in the last book which is not shown in the OVA since the OVA only covers the first book in the four-volume series.

== Characters ==
Mira Munakata (宗方 実良, Munakata Mira)
Voiced by: Hikaru Midorikawa
Mira is a freshman at Hakouh High School. He has a secret affair with his father, Kyōsuke, although at first he believes that he cannot be with this one due to their consanguineous relationship. He develops jealousy by believing that his father was dating the famous movie actress, Mitsuki Utsunomiya. However, a short time later he discovers that he is not the son of Kyōsuke, who actually turns out to be his uncle, and despite this he loves him with an implacable fervor.
Kyōsuke Munakata (宗方 鏡介, Munakata Kyōsuke)
Voiced by: Shinichiro Miki
Kyōsuke is a famous Hollywood actor. He is Mira's father, with whom he maintains a secret romance. His world revolves around his son and since he was young he has dedicated himself to raising him. It is known that he accepted to take charge of Mira, who is actually his nephew, when he was fourteen years old, because he did not want his older sister, Mitsuki, to lose her chance to be famous. Since then, he has raised Mira as his son.
Kazuki Hino (日野 一樹, Hino Kazuki)
Voiced by: Susumu Chiba
Childhood friend of Mira's, unrequited love.
Mitsuki Utsunomiya (宇都宮 美月, Utsunomiya Mitsuki)
Voiced by: Masako Katsuki
Mira's biological mother and Kyōsuke's older sister.
Takayuki Utsunomiya (宇都宮 貴之, Utsunomiya Takayuki)
Voiced by: Takehito Koyasu

Son to Mira Munakata's biological mother, Mitsuki. Calls Mira his kitten (子猫ちゃん Koneko-chan) and enters the story as the third consummated love interest of Mira in the second novel.

Shun Sakurai (桜井 シュン, Sakurai Shun)
Voiced by: Shun

Mira and Kazuki's childhood friend. He plays the electric guitar as his moe characteristic. Not romantically involved.

Ryousuke Munakata (宗方 涼介, Munakata Ryousuke)
Novel only

Kyousuke Munakata's cousin and the actual father of Mira Munakata who falls in love with Mira Munakata in the last book in the series.

== Media ==
=== Light novel ===
No.	Japanese release date	Japanese ISBN
1	April 1, 1999	978-4-592-87104-0
2	February 17, 2000	978-4592871590
3	July 18, 2000	978-4592871804
4	May 17, 2001	978-4592872160
5	July 16, 2004	978-4592873983
6	January 19, 2006	978-4592874553

=== OVA ===
Two original video animation (OVA) directed by Asumi Matsumura and produced by Tomoko Ohno and Yoko Maki were released in November 2005, the ending song is "closer to you" by It's. The OVA was licensed in North America by Media Blasters under their Kitty Media label and released on December 30, 2008 with English subtitles.

No.	Title	Original release date
1	TBA	November 23, 2005
2	TBA	December 21, 2005
