= R. Bruce Elliott =

American actor

- Born: Robert Bruce Elliott; Renton, Washington, U.S.
- Occupations: Actor; director; scriptwriter
- Years active: 1989–present

Robert Bruce Elliott is an American actor, director and scriptwriter. He provided voices for a number of English versions of Japanese anime series; one of his most notable roles was Richard Moore in the detective series Case Closed. He also appeared on television and on film for a variety of shows and movies from Barney & Friends to JFK to Finding North. He is also the current voice of Ginyu, replacing Brice Armstrong in the Funimation dub of the Dragon Ball series.

== Filmography ==
=== Animation ===
List of English dubbing performances in animation
Year	Series	Role	Notes	Source
2004	Kiddy Grade	Additional voices		
2004	Case Closed	Richard Moore	Also movies and specials	
2004	Fullmetal Alchemist	Basque Gran		
2004	Spiral	Keishisei Kanzaka		
2004–05	Sgt. Frog	Narrator		
2005	Burst Angel	Narrator, Grey Capo		
2005	Gunslinger Girl	Additional Voices, Italian Prime Minister	Also in Gunslinger Girl II: Teatrino	
2005	Baki the Grappler	Hitoshi Kuriyagawa, Gouki Shibukawa		
2005	Lupin the 3rd: The Columbus Files	Burton		
2006	Desert Punk	Shiek Marimo		
2006	Samurai 7	Shimada Kanbei		
2006	Speed Grapher	Dr. Mizonoguchi		
2006	Basilisk	Azuki Rousai		
2006	Shin-chan	Nurse	Ep. 17	
2006	Dragon Ball Z – Movie: The World's Strongest	Dr. Wheelo	FUNimation Re-dub	
2006	Kenichi: The Mightiest Disciple	Hayato Fūrinji		
2007	SoltyRei	Neumann, Dr. Dewey Black	Eps. 2, 3	
2007	Origin: Spirits of the Past	Agashi		
2007	One Piece	Edward Newgate, Dr. Nako, Henzo, Gancho		
2007	BECK: Mongolian Chop Squad	Mr. Saito		
2007	Mushishi	Mio's father, additional voices		
2007–08	School Rumble	Narrator	Also OVAs	
2007	Witchblade	Tatsuoki Furumizu		
2007	Glass Fleet	Jean Luc Silvernail		
2008	Evangelion: 1.0 You Are (Not) Alone	Additional voices		
2008	Shuffle!	Doctor B	Ep. 23	
2008	Sasami: Magical Girls Club	Grandpa	Ep. 10	
2008	Ouran High School Host Club	Kasanoda's Father		
2009	Shigurui: Death Frenzy	Gonzaemon Ushimata		
2009	Romeo X Juliet	Conrad	ADR Director, directing debut	
2009	Baccano!	Szilard Quates		
2009	Spice and Wolf	Clothing Shop Owner	Ep. 7	
2010	Black Butler	Tanaka		
2010	Rin: Daughters of Mnemosyne	Nakayama		
2010	Strike Witches	Additional Voices	Ep. 3	
2010	Dragon Ball Z Kai	Captain Ginyu		
2010	Corpse Princess		ADR Director	
2011-2019	Fairy Tail	Makarov and Faust		
2011	Chaos;Head	Yuudai Kuramochi		
2012	Thermae Romae	Lepidus	2nd-half of Ep. 1	
2012	King of Thorn	Alessandro Peccino		
2012	Kamisama Kiss	Master Shojobo		
2013	Robotics;Notes	Doc		
2013	Wolf Children	Hosokawa		
2013	Last Exile: Fam, the Silver Wing	Sadri		
2014	Space Dandy	Narrator		
2014–2024	Attack on Titan	Dot Pyxis		
2015	Tokyo Ghoul	Iwao Kuroiwa		
2015	Highschool DxD	Odin		
2015	Blood Blockade Battlefront	Raju Jugei Shizuyoshi	Ep. 8	
2016	Orange	School Principal		
2016	Assassination Classroom	Matsukata	Season 2, Ep. 6, 10	
2017	Dragon Ball Super	Captain Ginyu, Senbei Norimaki		
2017	Samurai Warriors	Shingen Takeda		
2017	In Another World with My Smartphone	Jamukha Blau Mismede		
2018	Hoshin Engi	Ki Sho	Ep. 4	
2020	My Hero Academia	Shie Hassaikai Boss	Season 4, Ep. 7, 11, 14	
2020	Arte	Aroldo		
2020	By the Grace of the Gods	Gain		
2021	The Dungeon of Black Company	Skeleton Senpai		
2021	Irina: The Vampire Cosmonaut	Narrator		
2022	My Dress-Up Darling	Kaoru		
2022	Lucifer and the Biscuit Hammer	Inachika Akitani		
2023	The Kingdoms of Ruin	Goethe		
2024	Fairy Tail: 100 Years Quest	Makarov Dreyar		
2024	Natsume's Book of Friends	Nanamaki		
2024	Demon Lord, Retry! R	Idol		
2025	The Red Ranger Becomes an Adventurer in Another World	Poseidon		
2026	The Daily Life of a Middle-Aged Online Shopper in Another World	Old Man		

=== Live action ===
List of live-action acting performances in film and television
Year	Series	Role	Notes	Source
1989	Fletch Lives	Info Technician		
1991	JFK	Bolton Ford Dealer		
1993	Murder in the Heartland	Dr. Quill		
1993	Barney & Friends	Mr. Tenagain	Episode: "Having Tens of Fun!"	
1994	The Chase	Frank Smuntz		
1995	Walker, Texas Ranger	Kyle Jennings	Episode: "Evil in the Night"	
1998	Finding North	T.V. Salesman		
2000	Walker, Texas Ranger	Store Owner	Episode: "A Matter of Principle"	
2000	Dr. T & the Women	City Council Member		
2002	The Anarchist Cookbook	Coffee Shop Manager		
2007	Barney & Friends	Ryan's Grandpa	Episode: "The Newest Kid/Grandpa's Visit"	
2009	Carried Away	Wilton		
2016	Shin Godzilla	Yanagihara		Live action English dubbing

=== Video games ===
List of voice performances in video games
Year	Series	Role	Notes	Source
2004	BloodRayne 2	Xerx		
2005	Brothers in Arms: Road to Hill 30	German officer		
2005	Æon Flux (video game)	Keeper		
2007	Dragon Ball Z: Budokai Tenkaichi 3	Dr. Wheelo		
2009	Case Closed: The Mirapolis Investigation	Richard Moore		
2009	Ghostbusters: The Video Game	Additional Voice Talent		
2009	Soul of the Ultimate Nation	Narrator, various characters		
2010	Comic Jumper: The Adventures of Captain Smiley	The Puttmaster		
2010	Dragon Ball Z: Tenkaichi Tag Team	Captain Ginyu		
2010	Dragon Ball: Raging Blast 2	Captain Ginyu		
2011	Orcs Must Die!	Master		
2011	Dragon Ball Z: Ultimate Tenkaichi	Captain Ginyu		
2012	Orcs Must Die! 2	Master		
2012	Dragon Ball Z: For Kinect	Captain Ginyu		
2013	The Walking Dead: Survival Instinct	Sheriff Turner, Harrison, Dixon		
2014	Dragon Ball Z: Battle of Z	Captain Ginyu		
2014	Smite	Anubis		
2014	The Sailor's Dream	The Radio Voice		
2015	Dragon Ball XenoVerse	Captain Ginyu		
2016	Dragon Ball XenoVerse 2	Captain Ginyu		
2018	Dragon Ball FighterZ	Captain Ginyu		
2018	Dragon Ball Legends	Captain Ginyu		
2020	Dragon Ball Z: Kakarot	Captain Ginyu, Senbei Norimaki		
2024	Dragon Ball: Sparking! ZERO	Captain Ginyu, Dr. Wheelo		
