= List of Hoshin Engi characters =

Below is a list of characters from the anime series Hoshin Engi.

== Kongrong Mountains ==
Taikobo (太公望, Taikōbō)
Voiced by: Hiro Yūki (1st series), Kensho Ono (2nd series) (Japanese); J. Shannon Weaver (1st series), Josh Grelle (2nd series) (English)

The protagonist of the series. He is a disciple at the Kongrong Mountains and Genshi Tenson's best pupil. He received the Hoshin Project from Genshi Tenson, and became a strategist to defeat the collapsing Yin dynasty and to help King Bu of Zhou. Although he wears very strange clothes, he has the sharpest mind in Kongrong. Taikobo was the son of the leader of the Qiang tribe, and was named Ryobo, but he lost his parents in a Yin human hunt. After twelve years on earth, he became a disciple, and with 30 years of study, attained Senin level power.

Although Taikobo is still an average Senin with a low rank, he is the personal disciple of the leader of Kongrong, Genshi Tenson, so his position in the Sennin World is high. At the beginning of the story, he receives a retractable baton-shaped paope (magic tool) called Dashinben, which grants him the power to create and control wind. Later, because of the Orb of Revival, the Dashinben gets an upgrade, a larger shape and improved abilities. Eventually, his Dashinben is upgraded by fusing with the paope 'Kyokoki' that can absorb the Kongrong Mountains's energy for recovery, and the super paope, 'Taikyokuzu,' that negates all other paope's power, draw magic seals and can heal injuries. Basically, his speciality is fighting by wits, and using cleverness to swindle his enemies, so that sometimes even his allies boo him. His constant companion, main ally, and mode of transportation is the spirit beast, Supushan. Taikobo's real age is at least 72 years old, and contrary to his boyish appearance, love of peaches and sweet things, and dislike of shots and medicine, his speech and mannerisms are that of an old man. His personality is aloof, and he has a strong belief in a peaceful Human World. Additionally, he is left-handed, but during the fight with Inkou (the older), he lost his left arm up to the elbow. Soon after, he received an artificial arm created by Taiitsu Shinjin.

Taikobo is a vegetarian. Although Taikobo is often criticized by other characters for being very 'un-protagonist-like,' he was voted first in a Weekly Shonen Jump character poll twice. Sometimes he's drawn as a cat-like alien creature. The last volume of the Kanzenban came with a limited edition plush toy of this form.

Supushan (四不象, Sūpūshan)
Voiced by: Yōichi Masukawa (1st series), Takahiro Sakurai (2nd series) (Japanese); Steve Flanagin (1st series), Tyler Walker (2nd series) (English)
Taikobo's spirit beast who has the appearance of a white hippo (his original design was more like a dragon). Supushan uses the inflection "~su" at the end of sentences. He has adult-like and serious personality. Originally, he lived in his birthplace in the Suupuu valley in Northern Europe with his parents, Suupuupapa and Suupuumama, but Suupuupapa, Genshi Tenson's spirit beast, was greatly wounded in a battle with Chou Koumei, and was forced to retire. In order to support the family, a young Supushan went off to work. From the beginning, he carries the Orb of Revival, which he uses to come back to life in a temporary adult form after he was killed in the battle with Chou Koumei. In his adult form, his voice and speech patterns change, and, like all adults of his species, can eat paope energy. The battle with Bunchu activates a licence designating Supushan as an adult, and from that point forward, he is able to transform at will. Later, he receives a second Orb of Revival, recovered from the ruins of Kingo Island.
Nataku (哪吒)
Voiced by: Kōki Miyata (1st series), Makoto Furukawa (2nd series) (Japanese); Derek Wade (1st series), Justin Briner (2nd series) (English)
A living human-paope (divine superweapon) hybrid, he was once dead and now revived, with the aid of Taiitsu, built via lotus plant. He exists largely to fight and is more "directed" by Taikobo (provided that he actually listens), albeit at times that becomes hazardous to Taikobo's health, as Nataku has no qualms about shooting his weapons at people. He can fly thanks to his special paope, Fuukarin, which are metal wheels. He also possesses a weapon paope in the shape of 2 iron bracelets called Kenkonen, which work as homing missiles and striking his target with tremendous force. Throughout the manga, Nataku gets several upgrades from Taiitsu. Towards the end, Nataku receives the super paope Kinkousen (previously wielded by Chou Koumei) and has it integrated within his body, allowing him to summon up to seven dragons made of light.
Nataku may seem cold and emotionless, but, according to himself, he has a serious grudge against his father who was responsible for destroying the grave his mother made for him when he died; Nataku has had many chances to kill his father, but never did. Nataku also has a soft spot for his mother, and takes care of Ko Tensho as a brother figure.
Yozen (楊戩, Yōzen)
Voiced by: Susumu Chiba (1st series), Yūichi Nakamura (2nd series) (Japanese); Ben Wolfe (1st series), Ian Ferguson (2nd series) (English)
A disciple at the Kongrong Mountains. Actually, he is the son of the leader of Kingoto, Tsutenkyoushu and a yokai senin. He surpassed his teacher Gyakutei Shinjin and has power equal to a senin, but because he does not want to take a student, he remains one himself. His senin name is Kenseijiro Shinkun. He is a person of extreme confidence and takes great pride in his appearance. At first, he doubted Taikobo's strength, and proposed a test, but finally approved of his means and became an ally. He has the ability to change into the body of any living thing, although his favorite transformation is that of Dakki. When transforming into a doshi or senin, he can use the other's paope, but if they are a higher level, he cannot copy them perfectly. Because of his ability to transform without using paope, even the Seninkai call him the genius disciple. Halfway through the series, he learns how to use a partial transformation and only change part of his body. This way, he can copy multiple of paope at the same time. When he becomes hanyotai, his strength is increased. His own paope are 'Sansento,' a giant trident that can release a shock wave, and 'Kotenken' a paope with the appearance of a dog which lives in his sleeve and can be called to attack enemies or used as a riding mount to fly. Towards the end, he obtained the cape super paope 'Rikukonhan,' which wraps up enemies so that not even their soul escapes. After the final battle, he founded the new Seninkai.
Bukichi (武吉)
Voiced by: Naomi Nagasawa (1st series), Yuma Uchida (2nd series) (Japanese); Coby Lewin (2nd series) (English)
A tennendoushi who used to be a woodcutter in Seiki. He proclaims himself as Taikobo's disciple. His aspiration to become Taikobo's disciple was quickly refused, but later, he saves Taikobo's life, and eventually travels together with him. His personality is natural and true to himself. His eyesight is 10.0, can perceive infra-red light, and can see in the dark. He has the ability to run on water. When he is overly emotional, his fighting strength increases a surprising amount, even enough to injure senin. He has had an abundance of unusual part time jobs, including elephant trainer and bird breeder. Although no one except sendo should be able to touch paope, Bukichi is seen many times coming into contact with them.
Raishinshi (雷震子)
Voiced by: Rica Matsumoto (Japanese); Craig Saper (English)
As an infant, he was saved by Sho Ki and became his 100th child. He only had one senin bone, however, he became the disciple of the eccentric Sennin at the Kongrong Mountains, Unchushi. Under his experiments, Raishinshi's skin became black, and he grew the wind and lighting controlling, wing-shaped paope, Tensoyoku, from his back. With that power, he successfully escaped from Unchushi's tyrannical experiments, and thought to return to his father, but concerned with his current form, he instead gained fame as thief for the people, during which he fought and lost to Taikobo. At this chance, he disbanded his group of thieves, and after training in the Kongrong Mountains, he participated in the Shu revolution.
Because he was busy having his wings remodeled (increasing power and upgrading to three pairs), he has proportionately less screen time than other characters. However, toward the final battle, his number of appearances increase. In the manga version, by the time of his father's, Sho Ki's, death, they had not met, but in the anime they are reunited. Raishinshi is a comedy relief type character with a hot temper.
Hiko Ko (黄飛虎, Kō Hiko)
Voiced by: Kazunari Tanaka (1st series), Yoshimasa Hosoya (2nd series) (Japanese); Christopher Loveless (1st series), Brad Hawkins (2nd series) (English)
Originally, Yin's Chinkoku Buseio. He is the father of Ko Tenka and Ko Tensho. His superhuman strength is such that he can destroy even paope with his bare hands. His body can endure very strong poisons, and he has the force of will to withstand mind control by a super paope, as he is a tennendoushi (a human with senin bones). For generations, his ancestors served Yin, so he was loyal to King Chu, but could not withstand Dakki's conniving. He met Taikobo who came to defeat Dakki, and they immediately trusted and respected one other. Some years later, Hiko lost his wife, Kashi and his sister, Koshi, to Dakki's schemes and decided to leave Yin. After which, he was appointed Kaikoku Buseiou by Sho Ki of Zhou. He has a rough and cheerful personality. Before he left for Zhou, he was friends with Bunchu, however, afterwards, they were irreconcilable and ended up fighting during the Sennin war, during which Hiko was hoshin-ed. In the anime, he lived, and he and Bunchu parted on friendly terms.
Tenka Ko (黄天化, Kō Tenka)
Voiced by: Isao Yamagishi (1st series), KENN (2nd series) (Japanese); Jeremiah Ocañas (1st series), Clifford Chapin (2nd series) (English)
A disciple at the Kongrong Mountains, and Hiko Ko's second son. One of the Kongrong 12 Elite Sennin, Seikyo Dotoku Shinkun, discovered and recruited him as a doushi. He appeared to save his father, who was being chased by pursuers from the Yin rebellion. He has his father's upstanding spirit and fighting skills, but his mother's, Kashi's, black hair. He uses the inflection "-sa" at the end of a sentence, and is always smoking a cigarette. He is master of the lightsaber-like paope, 'Bakuya no Hoken,' and later receives a fire-emitting, boomerang paope called 'Karyuhyo,' and the tiny 'Sanshintei.' Lastly, he could use the 'Bakuya no Hoken 2,' which has a blade on either side of the handle. Because of his absolute self confidence in close combat, and too much of a warrior's spirit, he extremely hates to lose. As a result of a cursed wound received from one of Chou Koumei's yokai senin subordinates, his life was shortened. He fought King Chu in order to avenge his mother, but after he defeated him, he lost his resolve and immediately killed a nameless soldier and hoshin-ed; this only happens in the manga, however, as he lives in the 1999 anime and even appears to have a love interest. He has a rough attitude and would jump to conclusions.
Tenka is also a vegetarian.
Ko Tensho (黄天祥, Kō Tenshō)
Voiced by: Sachi Matsumoto (PS2 game), Daiki Kobayashi (2nd series) (Japanese); Alison Viktorin (2nd series) (English)
Hiko Ko's fourth and youngest son, a Tennendoshi who inherited his father's strengths. He views Nataku as a friend and older brother, perhaps ignorant of the destructive tendencies Nataku possesses. After his mother, aunt, father and brother die, Tensho closed himself off, until Nataku told him that he would take care of Tensho, and that he would never lose or die. At first, Tensho used a spear for a weapon, but after his father's death, switched to using Hito (a sword Hiko Ko had attained from one of Cho Kumei's subordinates).
To Sengyoku (鄧蝉玉, Tō Sengyoku)
Originally a doshi from Kingo Islands, she was dispatched by Bunchu as a spy. As a result of falling in love with Dokouson, she turned traitor and joined with the Shu along with her father, Tokyuko. The wrong impression is a violent, wholeheartedly bright young girl. She is not good at telling things like hippos or Capybaras, but she gets along with Supushan and calls Dokoson 'Honey.' Her paope, 'Gokoseki,' has the ability that once thrown, it will always hit its target, and give them the appearance of wearing too much make-up, but there was a limiter that suppressed its power to 1/5. When the limiter was canceled, its destructive power increased. After the final battle, she got her wish and married a reluctant Dokoson.
Igo (韋護)
Voiced by: Yūichirō Umehara (Japanese); Jason Liebrecht (English)
The disciple of one of the 12 Kongrong Elite Sennin, Doko Tenson. Little is known about him before he came to the Sennin World. He likes bad puns and sake. However, he is more serious than he appears. He has binkanhada (very sensitive skin), which he can utilize in some of his fights. His paope, 'Goumasho' is a boring but powerful, blunt rounded club, which can transform into a sharp edged sword. When he's around Taikobo, he's seems lazy.
Ryuukitsu Koushu (竜吉公主, Ryūkitsu Kōshu)
Voiced by: Saori Hayami (Japanese); Trina Nishimura (English)
A child of two Sennin parents, she can only live in the pure air of the Sennin World, and as the air of the Human World is poisonous to her, she rarely descends there. She wields the water paope, Muroken Konmo, and is constantly surrounded by a protective water veil. She is said to be at a very high level, comparable to Dakki or Bunchu, but because of her condition, she does not fight often.
Unchushi (雲中子, Unchūshi)
Voiced by: Daisuke Ishikawa (1st series), Hirofumi Nojima (2nd series) (Japanese); Corey M. Gagne (English)
Raishinshi's master, Unchushi is one of the freaks of the Sennin World (along with Doutoku and Taiitsu). He likes biology to the point of obsession, and regularly performs experiments on people. Raishinshi is one of the best examples, being given the apricot which would give him wings, then having his wings made bigger and multiplied when asleep. Unchuushi was overjoyed when he found a parasitic paope on himself, finally given the chance to experiment with his own body.
Su Kokuko (崇黒虎, Sū Kokuko)
Voiced by: Katashi Ishizuka (Japanese); Robert Newell (English)
He does not have a paope, as he trained in martial arts while in the Kongrong Mountains (although he did use a sword to duel Buseio), and his reijyu, Shinyo, is the leader of all birds, therefore, he also has the power to control them. He has a strange way of talking, and is a character that goes at his own pace.

=== 12 Kongrong Elite Sennin ===
The 12 Kongrong Elite Sennin (崑崙十二仙, Konron Jūni-sen) are a group of elite Sennin.

Nento Dojin (燃燈道人, Nentō Dōjin)
A former member of the 12 Kongrong Elite Sennin who left the Kongrong Mountains 500 years before the beginning of the series during a staged fight with Genshitenson. By leaving the Sennin World, he was able to hunt down Joka in secret. While he is skilled in the use of paope, his mastery of 'Magic Spells' allow him to fight without any weapons, capable of even stopping a super paope with his bare hands. He cares very deeply about his half-sister, Ryukitsu Koshu, to the point that other characters comment on his devotion.
Fujisaki re-used an earlier design he made for the game "The Great Sennin World War" and recolored the character to create Nentou.
Taiitsu Shinjin (太乙真人)
Voiced by: Daisuke Sakaguchi (1st series), Daisuke Hirakawa (2nd series) (Japanese); Orin Serivello (1st series), Matt Shipman (2nd series) (English)
Taiitsu Shinjin is the machine-crazy Sennin who is responsible for putting the Reiju into Inshi's (Sei Li's wife, and Nataku's mother) stomach, creating the birth of the paope human Nataku; in a sense, he is Nataku's father. Despite that, Taiitsu is "bullied" by Nataku for repair of his broken paope, or demanding new paope (however, Taiitsu still seems to view Nataku as a son, and cares deeply for him). Even though Taiitsu is rather weak, he is acknowledged as one of the 12 Kongrong Elite Sennin because of his ability to create paope; many things like the Kokinrikushi (the flying robot paope) and Kongrong 2 were made by Taiitsu. Although he has made many paope, his main one is a nutshell-like protection paope (its main use is to shut Nataku in whenever he disobeys him).
Taiitsu also provides some of the comic relief in the story in that he is scared of heights, and that he will always look for the camera and look into it while talking.
Fugen Shinjin (普賢真人)
Voiced by: Megumi Ogata (1st series), Nobunaga Shimazaki (2nd series) (Japanese); Jon S. Watson (1st series), Aaron Dismuke (2nd series) (English)
Fugen is Taikobo's kind-hearted friend from when the two did their training together, and he is a person very much like Taikobo, in that he does not wish for anyone to get hurt, even if it means the sacrifice of himself. In battle, he always aims for negotiation, and is always smiling even in dire situations. Fugen is also the one who gave Taikobo a straight fishhook, saying that the fish shouldn't suffer just for the sake of Taikobo thinking. He is a Sennin well-versed in chemistry, and his paope is one which controls the atoms. He is one of the 12 Kongrong Elite Sennin, the one who replaced Nento Doujin after his faked death. His disciple is Mokutaku.
Fugen perceives Taikobo as family, deciding years ago that he would not allow Taikobo to die, no matter what. He was killed in the Great Sennin War.
Gyokutei Shinjin (玉鼎真人)
Voiced by: Junichi Suwabe (Japanese); Chuck Huber (English)
Gyokutei Shinjin is the stereotype "cool" guy, and takes everything too seriously. He is Yozen's master, and one of the few people Yozen sees as being above him, even when Yozen's abilities surpass Gyokutei's. He was killed by Otenkun in the Great Sennin War while protecting Yozen. Gyokutei's paope, "Zensenken," is of a slicing type, being able to cut at high speeds. He is one of the 12 Kongrong Elite Sennin.
Seikyo Dotoku Shinkun (清虚道徳真君, Seikyo Dōtoku Shinkun)
Voiced by: Showtaro Morikubo (Japanese); Ricco Fajardo (English)
Doutoku is a Sennin obsessed with sports, and also the master of Ko Tenka. He wields the Bakuya no Houken 2, the same as Tenka's lightsaber-like paope, except double-ended. Before his death in the Great Sennin War, he entrusts Yozen with his paope, to give to Tenka. He is one of the 12 Kongrong Elite Sennin.
Doko Tenson (道行天尊, Dokō Tenson)
Voiced by: Aki Toyosaki (Japanese); Brittney Karbowski (English)
A member of the 12 Kongrong Elite Sennin who has the appearance of a baby with a long tail. He ends his sentences with "-chu" and acts cutely, although at times he has a much harsher personality, such as when Nataku threatened to leave him behind in Kingo. His paope, "Bannou Bouchou," looks like a knife. His disciple is Igo.
Nentou Doujin (道行天尊)
Voiced by: Takuma Terashima (Japanese); Orion Pitts (English)
He is the former leader of the 12 Kongrong Elite Sennin and half-brother of Ryuukitsu Koushu.
Koseishi (広成子, Kōseishi)
A militaristic member of the 12 Kongrong Elite Sennin and Inko's master. His paope is the Bantennin. He was killed in the Great Sennin War while fighting Bunchu.
Sekiseishi (赤精子)
A member of the 12 Kongrong Elite Sennin, he wields the Onmyoukyou paope. He trained the younger brother Inkou, and always has a visor over his eyes and carries a sword. He was killed in the fight with Bunchu.
Reihodaihoshi (霊宝大法師, Reihōdaihōshi)
A member of the 12 Kongrong Elite Sennin who has the paope "Rakkonsho". He was killed in the fight with Bunchu.
Kuryuson (懼留孫, Kūryūson)
A member of the 12 Kongrong Elite Sennin with the paope "Konsenjou." He was killed in the fight with Bunchu.
Monju Koho Tenson (文殊広法天尊, Monju Kōhō Tenson)
A member of the 12 Kongrong Elite Sennin with the paope "Rurihei," a rocket-launcher type. He was killed in the fight with Bunchu.
Jiko Dojin (慈航道人, Jikō Dōjin)
A member of the 12 Kongrong Elite Sennin, and one of the first to die in the fight against Bunchu.
Koryu Shinjin (黄竜真人, Kōryū Shinjin)
Voiced by: Masaaki Mizunaka
A member of the 12 Kongrong Elite Sennin, and one of the first to die in the fight against Bunchu.

== Kingo Islands ==
Tsuten Kyoshu (通天教主, Tsūten Kyōshu)
Voiced by: Hideyuki Hori (Japanese); Mark Stoddard (English)
One of the Sandai Sennin (along with Genshi Tenson and Taijo Roukun) and leader of the Kingoto Yokai. He wields the Super paope, Rikukonhan. It is revealed during the course of the series that Yozen is his son, whom he traded with Genshi Tenson for O Eki in order to ease tensions between Kingo and Kongrong.
Chokomei (趙公明, Chōkōmei)
One of the Sankyou Sennin, a plant based Yokai known for his fabulousness. He has the Super paope Kinkousen, which has the appearance of a pair of gardening shears. Its attack releases seven rainbow dragons when fully utilized. He also created the Bakuryusaku, a projection paope that took him 1000 years to develop. He uses random French phrases in his speech, and is often seen holding a wine glass. His houhin is remarkably gorgeous, including a circle of light and a choir of cherub angels.
The Unshou Sanshimai (雲霄三姉妹, Unshō Sanshimai)
Voiced by: Kimiko Saito (Venus), U-ko Tachibana (Queen), Kyo Yaoya (Madonna) (Japanese); Meli Grant (Venus), Heather Walker (Queen), Jeannie Tirado (Madonna) (English)
Chokomei's three younger sisters, Venus, Queen and Madonna. Their real names are Unshou, Keishou, and Hekishou, but they refuse to be called by that. They use the paope Kinkousen, Kongenkinto, Kyodaibaopeerobo, and the Mysterious Veil. Venus is in (very unrequited) love with Taikobo, Madonna is extremely obese but can move by eating special candies made by her sisters. Queen looks like a hideous old witch, Venus looks like a very muscular cross dressing man in a nurses outfit. Together they can use "Khyuukyokkukougajin" which creates a dimension where the three sisters are the size of giants and the enemy is shrunk to the size of ants on a humongous table full of candy.

=== Kingo Juttenkun ===
The Kingo Juttenkun (金鰲十天君) are the parallel organization to 12 Kongrong Elite Sennin. The Juttenkun is a group of ten Yokai Sennin, led by Otenkun. They use "Juuzetsujin" dimensional paope. They can combine they dimensions (mostly in pairs that have dimensions that complements one another).

Otenkun (王天君, Ōtenkun)
Voiced by: Nobuhiko Okamoto (Japanese); Derick Snow (English)
Originally a human disciple of Genshitenson's named Ou Eki, he was traded to Tsuuten Kyoushu for Yozen in order to maintain relations between Kingo and Kongrong. Because Kingou does not allow humans, he was locked away until Dakki appeared and split his soul into three and giving them yokai bodies.
He has the paope Kousuijin which causes acid rain, and the paope dani, an animal type peopei like Yozen's Koutenken, but in the form of tiny ticks that secretly latch onto Sennin and drain their energy as if they were constantly using a peopei.
Chotenkun (張天君, Chōtenkun)
Voiced by: Shinji Kawada (Japanese); Chris Guerrero (English)
One of the Jutenkun who controls the dimensional paope "Kousajin" which creates a sand dimension. He can control all the sand in his dimension and as long as the enemy is in his dimension they start to dehydrate and crumble into sand. He has very long arms and walks on his fingers with his feet curled up under him, he also wears an armadillo mask with a body and tail that covers his back. He was defeated by Yozen.
Sontenkun (孫天君)
Voiced by: Yoshitsugu Matsuoka (Japanese); Sonny Strait (English)
A yokai with the appearance of a toy. His dimensional paope, "Keketsujin," uses the form of a child's room, where he has control over all his toys (he can make them explode to attack), as well as the ability to turn his opponents into toys if they lose against him in a game. He is killed by Gyokutei Shinjin.
Totenkun (董天君, Tōtenkun)
Voiced by: Junji Majima (Japanese); Aaron Roberts (English)
A Jutenkun who looks like a bug. His "Fukoujin" dimension paope only has one pillar suspended above a thin net that can cut through flesh, and permeated by a strong wind. He is killed by falling off the pillar, after being tricked by the Ko family.
Entenkun (袁天君)
Voiced by: Jun Fukushima (Japanese); Greg Ayres (English)
A member of the Jutenkun who controls the ice dimension paope, "Kanbyojin." He is indirectly killed by Fugen.
Chotenkun (Zhao) (趙天君, Chōtenkun)
Voiced by: Yasuhiro Kikuchi (Japanese); Ray Hurd (English)
A different Choutenkun to the one above, his appearance is that of a talking stone slab monolith, his dimensional paope is called "Chiretsujin." He is killed by Nataku.
Yotenkun (姚天君, Yōtenkun)
Voiced by: Nobuo Tobita (Japanese); Eric Rolon (English)
A Jutenkun who is dress in a priest like robe, he wields the dimensional paope "Rakkojin", which is a variety of paper runes that cause explosions or fire beams (both attacks damage the enemies body and soul). He fights together with Kinkou Seiba. He is killed by Igo.
Kinko Seiba (金光聖母, Kinkō Seiba)
Voiced by: Nanako Mori (Japanese); Amber Lee Connors (English)
A Jutenkun who that wears a witch's hat and a cloak which renders her whole body invisible except for gloved hands. She wields the dimensional paope "Kinkojin" which can bend or emit light. Those trapped in her dimension are forced to fight their own shadows (dealing damage to themselves) unless they stay out of the light she emits. She fights as a team with Yotenkun. She is killed by Nataku.
Hakutenkun (柏天君)
A Jutenkun that appears as some kind of stone altar. It wields the dimensional paope "Retsuenjin" which can create powerful balls of flames (akin to volcanic eruptions). Working together with Shintenkun's "Tenzetsujin" to create a barrage of flaming meteors. It is accidentally hoshin-ed by Madonna.
Shintenkun (秦天君)
Twin yokai who are always conjoined together. They wield the dimensional paope "Tenzetsujin" which creates an outer space like dimension full of meteors. Working together with Hakutenkun's "Retsuenjin" to create a barrage of flaming meteors. They are accidentally hoshin-ed by Madonna.

== Zhou ==
Sho Ki (姫昌, Ki Shō), Shu Bun'o (周文王, Shū Bun'ō)
Voiced by: Mugihito (1st series), Motomu Kiyokawa and Daisuke Ono as younger Sho Ki (2nd series) (Japanese); Robert Rudie (1st series), R. Bruce Elliott (2nd series) and David Matranga as younger Sho Ki (2nd series) (English)
A benevolent and decent man who rules the West of China. He had 26 wives and 100 children. He is reluctant to turn on his Emperor, despite the absolute evil that the man engages in until his son's murder. He died of self induced starvation because he could not bring himself to eat after learning that he had eaten his eldest son in the form of a meat patty that he jokingly called "Hamburg steak" in front of the meal server. In the anime, he is able to escape from Choka thanks to Hiko Ko and with the help of Taikobo, he returns with his army to overthrow Yin.
Ki Hakuyuukou (姫伯邑考, Ki Hakuyūkō)
Voiced by: Kōichi Asuka (1st series), Wataru Hatano (2nd series) (Japanese); Gray Haddock (1st series), Blake Shepard (2nd series) (English)
Sho Ki's eldest son. He is true to himself, capable and handsome, but in order to save Sho Ki, he went to the capital of Yin, Choka, and was killed by Dakki. His murder was depicted in chapter 25 titled "Dakki and Kibi's 3-Minute Cooking", in which the two cheerfully prepared a meal for his father with his flesh.
Hatsu Ki (姫発) King Bu (武王, Bu Ō)
Voiced by: Kazuo Kobayashi (1st series), Daisuke Ono (2nd series) (Japanese); Joey Hood (1st series), Austin Tindle (2nd series) (English)
Sho Ki's second eldest son. He is a gambler, pervert, and idiot, but also capable of ruling a country justly. After his father Sho Ki died, Hatsu took on the throne, leading the Shou to victory against the Yin. When first introduced, Hatsu was a pervert deep in debt, but at the end, he was a king who the people greatly admire and like.
Ryo Yukyo (呂邑姜, Ryo Yūkyō)
Yukyo is one of the few left of the Kyo clan, a relative of Taikobo. Yukyo and Ryo Bo are the only remaining members of the royal bloodline. She was raised by Roshi via hologram. After helping Ki Hatsu win the battle in Bokuya, she stayed in Choka, and eventually became his wife.
Nankyuu Katsu (南宮适, Nankyū Katsu; Nangong Kuo)
A general of the Shu. After Kou Hiko came to the Shuu, he dropped to the No. 2 position, so they clashed all the time, but after Hiko's death, Nan Kyukatsu became depressed and missed their competition. He is a very hot blooded man.
Sei Li (李靖, Ri Sei)
Voiced by: Kentarō Itō (1st series), Tarusuke Shingaki (2nd series) (Japanese); Edwin Neal (1st series), David Wald (2nd series) (English)
The evil but coward father of Nataku is a former Sennin. Instead of a man with good personality, in the manga, he only shows his weakness to his children. Thanks to Taikobo, Risei wants to change his personality and goes to Kongrong to continue training in the Sennin World.
Inshi (殷氏)
Voiced by: Ryōka Yuzuki (1st series), Atsuko Yuya (2nd series) (Japanese); Lara Toner (1st series), Stephanie Young (2nd series) (English)
Wife of Sei Li and mother of Nataku, Mokutaku and Kintaku. She is pictured as a somewhat beautiful woman, but with no spectacular intellectual abilities. In fact, we could say Inshi is air headed and doesn't think much. She loves Nataku but refuses to understand both her son's and her husband's mistakes. She does not seem to be bothered by Sei Li's hatred towards Nataku, nor to the latter's attempts at killing his father. She is Nataku's weak point and some enemies took advantage of this weakness on various occasions. Not much is seen of her during the anime or the manga.
Ki Tan (姫旦) Shuukou Tan (周彸旦, Shūkō Tan)
Voiced by: Masahiko Seno (1st series), Yasuaki Takumi (2nd series)
The intelligent younger brother of Ki family. He helps his brothers to rule the country and train the Shuu forces.

== Yin ==
King Chu (紂王, Chū Ō)
Voiced by: Takehito Koyasu (1st series), Daisuke Namikawa (2nd series) (Japanese); Corey M. Gagne (1st series), Luke Longacre (2nd series) (English)
The last Emperor of the Yin dynasty. King Chu, originally a good emperor with only a weakness to women, obeys almost all of Dakki's whims. His moments of sanity are rare, and only Bunchu's influence managed to have an effect upon him. He is the husband of Kyohi and Koshi (his harem consists of almost 200 women) and father of Inko (Yin Jiao) and Inko (Yin Hong). Before Dakki put him under her control, the Emperor cared about the people and his family, but after the unfortunate marriage to the fox yokai, he lost all of his senses. It is said Chu possesses Herculean strength and has been known to easily wrestle lions and bulls with his bare hands.
Dakki (妲己)
Voiced by: Yumi Kakazu (1st series), Yōko Hikasa (2nd series) (Japanese); Claire Hamilton (1st series), Alexis Tipton (2nd series) (English)

The main antagonist of the series. Overtaking So Dakki's body (a young woman who was brought to the imperial palace to be King Chu's 200th wife) Dakki the Sennyo bewitched the Emperor with the aid of her spell of Temptation, causing King Chu to come under her control. The vixen demon is 5,000 years old, very beautiful and intelligent to the point when she could be labeled as "genius". In the anime, she is pictured as the evil, selfish empress who wants nothing but power and cares only about herself and her two adoptive sisters Okijin and Kokibi.

She is capable of using multiple paopes at once (ex: two fans, the Veil of Temptation). Her most important paope is the Veil of Temptation and she is rarely seen without it. It emits a strong scent which affects all men and bring them under control. After her descent into the Human World, she took many names (Ou Shi, Bakki) and seduced the leaders, living in luxury. At first, she was content to throw over the top and overpriced parties, but after several hundreds of years, she mastered the Temptation spell and began her reign of cruelty.

Dakki obviously enjoys other people's torment. She even built torture devices like the Horaku or the Taibon (a pit full of poisonous snakes). She is a very good actress and is capable of hiding her emotions. Another ability would be her good knowledge of human psychology. In the manga, when Chu O's first wife was imprisoned, Dakki knew the woman could not stand the pressure any longer and allowed the guard to give the true empress anything she wished for, knowing that she will ask for a dagger in order to commit suicide. She predicted Bunchu's reaction when Hiko Ko left Choka. Bunchu and Hiko were friends and Bunchu would rather kill Hiko himself than let Dakki decide how and when it would be done.

She shows sympathy only to her sisters and to her adopted son, Ou Eki/O Tenkun. Cruel as Dakki might be, she turned out not to be entirely evil in the end. In the manga the reason Dakki worked for Joka was at first due to her desire for power. But after she learned about the Ancients and that they fused with the planet, she was deeply affected and so her secret goal became to obtain Joka's body so she too may become one with the world. In this way she was able to save Taikobo at the end.

In the manga, her lines almost always end with heart shapes.
Okijin (王貴人, Ōkijin)
Voiced by: Ryōka Yuzuki (1st series), M・A・O (2nd series) (Japanese); Katie Gillette (1st series), Leah Clark (2nd series) (English)
The youngest of Dakki's sisters, she is 1,000 years old and a Yokai Sennin. Her true form is that of a stone lute. Okijin can be hot headed and this gets her into trouble twice in the manga. The Yokai Sennin is smart, but she is eventually outwitted by Taikobou. She has an older sister, Kokibi, to which she shows affection, especially in the anime, where they can often be seen together. Okijin has the Shiju Hagoromo, made by Tsuten Kyoshu from the silk of a poison moth. It acts not only as a powerful poison and a corrosive acid, but she can ignite it with a spark to cause great damage.
Kokibi (胡喜媚)
Voiced by: Chiemi Chiba (1st series), Yoshino Nanjo (2nd series) (Japanese); Meredith May (1st series), Sarah Wiedenheft (2nd series) (English)
One of Dakki's sisters. Although she is far older than Okijin, she's very childish to the point of being creepy. Her real form is that of a Chikeisei bird (a time bird, whose feathers can turn anyone they touch younger and younger until they are nothing). She acts in a silly manner most of the time and does not understand much, but is caring towards her elder and younger sister (in the manga, she saves Okijin after she lost a battle and returned to her original form). She has a major crush on Supushan and even surrendered her Nyoi Hagoromo to Taikobo in order to prevent him from hurting Suupuu (of course, that was one of Taikobo's tricks). She has a transformation ability which rivals Yozen's. With the aid of her Hagoromo, she can transform into anyone, even Dakki. Kousen in Houshin Engi Gaiden is her younger brother. Kokibi can sense the presence of his younger brother when her younger brother is in same timeline.
In the manga, her lines almost always end with star shapes.
Bunchu (聞仲, Bunchū)
Voiced by: Takashi Matsuyama (1st series), Tomoaki Maeno (2nd series) (Japanese); Robert Kraft (1st series), J. Michael Tatum (2nd series) (English)
The Yin military strategist, he has been protecting the Yin because of a promise he made to his comrade Shushi, a lively young woman he once trained with. Bunchu has been the Yin's strategist and protector for 300 years and he had 30 emperors under his care. He was a disciple of T-san and became the second strongest under T-san. Determined to protect the Yin Dynasty, he was a formidable enemy. In the anime, he was the first who killed Dakki, after the Yin dynasty had fallen. His only close friend was Hiko, whose death prompted him to render his obsession meaningless and subsequently chose to end his own life. His spirit travels back to Choka and he bows one last time to King Chu. Then, he travels to the Yin burial grounds and sees the spirit of Shuushi, who thanks him for "doing such a great job" with the dynasty. Bunchu's spirit is seen later in the Houshindai, when he told to his follower Cho Kei to find his own path.
In the anime Bunchu does not die. After Dakki is defeated, he flies off on his spiritual beast. When asked where are they going, he answers: "Who knows?"
Kashi (賈氏)
Voiced by: Miyuki Uehara (1st series), Mai Nakahara (2nd series) (Japanese); Kara Bliss (1st series), Colleen Clinkenbeard (2nd series) (English)
Wife of Buseio and mother of his four children. Kashi is considered to be one of China's most beautiful and graceful women. Her beauty is renowned and reached even King Chu's ear, triggering the unfortunate events that led to her tragic death. She loves her husband deeply and takes great pride in being his wife. In the anime, she took care of the princes while their mother was imprisoned and even went out to face Dakki, in hope of getting Kyohi freed. She is pictured as being a kind, loving and at the same time strong woman, who endangered herself for the sake of the princes, whom she considered "the country's future".
In the manga, her character gets less scenes and her most important one is when she visits her sister-in-law and falls into Dakki's trap (chapter 26).
Unlike the manga, in the anime her soul is sent to the Hoshindai.
Koshi (黄氏, Kōshi)
Voiced by: Yuko Kato (1st series), Mikako Komatsu (2nd series) (Japanese); Unknown (1st series), Felecia Angelle (2nd series) (English)
Koshi is one of King Chu's wives. She is the younger sister of Buseio Hiko Ko. In the manga, she was confined to the imperial harem, but in the anime, she seems to be free to go wherever she wants. Koshi is an admirable character: she tried (in vain) to save the Empress from the soldiers who came to arrest her and even blocked their way in a desperate attempt to prevent them from taking away the Empress. She was the one who took the two princes and placed them in Kashi's care. She is very close to Kashi and tried to protect her from the Emperor's eyes; she was outraged when she died because Chu O violated the rite between an Emperor and his vassals. Realising that Dakki will hold her as a hostage against her brother, she threw herself off the balcony and granted Hiko Ko his freedom.
Unlike the manga, in the anime her soul was sent to the Houshindai.
Kyohi (姜妃, Kyōhi)
Voiced by: Naoko Miura (Japanese); Ellie McBride (English)

The lovely daughter of the King of the East, she was considered the most beautiful woman in the empire by her husband (that is, before he saw Dakki and Kashi). Mother of the two princes and legal wife of King Chu. After Dakki appeared and took over the Emperor's mind, the Empress became very depressed and could often be found crying. After her father was killed, she was accused of treason and imprisoned. Her royal pride and perhaps desperation determined her to commit suicide in her cell. In the anime, Kyouhi not only looks totally different from her manga counterpart, but she's a more lively character. Described by Buseio as being one of "the most refined ladies of the country" she was a kind, fair and generous person, loved by her people.

At the end of Hoshin Engi, there are some family scenes from the life of the royal couple. She always stood by her husband's side and they were shown having a happy marriage. But after Dakki showed up, Kyohi became sad and placed a lot of pressure on her son, Inchao's shoulders, because she wanted him to become a good emperor and an honorable man, "just like his father". After Dakki accused her of plotting to kill the Emperor, she is imprisoned. Meanwhile, Kashi takes care of her children, thus becoming Dakki's next target. When she found out about Kashi's summoning, Kyohi foresaw Dakki's plan and tried to stop her by ordering her servant to go and call Buseio immediately. Buseiou and Bunchu tried to make a plan to save the Empress, but failed to present something viable in time. Dakki convinced the Emperor to set his wife free and summoned her to the throne room. Kyohi defies Dakki, but in the end, she is forced by the Emperor to accept her gift. The gift proves to be a dagger that sticks to the hand magically. Scared, Kyohi hides the dagger from the inquiring Emperor, but eventually she unwillingly reveals the dagger. Framed, she sees no other way out and stabs herself with the dagger. Her last request was for Buseiou to take care of her children.

Both the manga and the anime Kyohis were sent to the Hoshin Dai. The only difference was that the manga Kyohi's human soul flew to the platform of souls, determining Taikobou to return to the Sennin World to investigate. Also, in the manga, her name changes into Kyoshi after the first half of the manga.

== Unaffiliated ==
Shinkohyo (申公豹, Shinkōhyō)
Voiced by: Akira Ishida(1st series), Kōsuke Toriumi (2nd series) (Japanese); Jim Canning (1st series), Kyle Igneczi (2nd series) (English)
The most powerful doushi under Dakki's Allies. At the beginning of the manga, he prefers to stay outside of the affair, as to watch it from an angle, and see how things turn out. He is also the first doushi listed on the Hoshin, and is also the first to confront Taikobo (and asks him with an air of excitement if he is on the list to begin with). He, like Taikobo, has a spirit beast named Koutenko. Shinkyohyo's only paope is the Raikouben; which he has only used against Taikobo. Raikouben's power was so tremendous that when Shinkyohyo first used it, he himself said that he was shocked at its abilities. Towards the middle of the series, he decides to side with Dakki, and persuades King Chu's eldest son to fight for the Yin. Eventually, though, when Dakki tries to escape Taikobo, she is attacked by Shinkohyo's Raikouben, and helps weaken her when Taikobo slices her in half. Shinkyoho was the only doushi on the Hoshin list that did not get sent to Houshindai, and was still on Earth with Taikobo in the last chapter.
Taijo Roukun (太上老君, Taijō Rōkun)
One of the Sandai Sennin, he is extremely lazy and spends most of his time sleeping. He created the resilient Taida suit to help him sleep peacefully. He used to be Shinkouhyou's master.
Kousen
Kousen is Kokibi's younger brother, who only appears in Hoshin Engi Gaiden. His real form is rare bird youkai Chikeisei. This bird youkai specie can travel freely in the past and future. It is the first time when Shinnou sent Taikobo and Shupushan to the past just at the moment when Kousen was resting up in same moment. He wanted to defeat Taikobo but unfortunately Taikobo didn't meet him in this moment. Kousen's appearance in past caused drastic change in Earth's history. Earth's history changed in large scale then Joka resurrected and destroyed the world.

== The Original People ==
Joka (女媧, Joka)
Voiced by: Maaya Sakamoto (Japanese); Monica Rial (English)
The strongest of the five Original People to come to Earth and the ultimate antagonist of the story. She has the paope "Sangashashoku" and "Shihoken." Her designs were to create the earth's history exactly the same as her world that evolved to the point where it was destroyed. The other Original People, not wishing for history to repeat itself, argued against this plan and put Joka in an eternal sleep, while they merged with the life of the planet, eventually creating the Sennin and Yokai. Joka has the ability to work behind the scenes as a spirit, while her body still sleeps, and subtly changes the world to more resemble her own, but when the histories diverge, she simply destroys the world and starts over. No one knows how long this cycle has been continuing until the current history. She has the ability to split her soul, which along with her regenerative abilities, make her a very difficult enemy to destroy completely. In the final battle, her body is taken over by Dakki before she can reach it, and Dakki uses that body to become the Great Mother and merge with the earth, like the other Original People.
There is much foreshadowing of Joka's appearance throughout the manga; for instance, Chou Koumei's ship is called the 'Queen Joker.'
Fukki (伏羲)
One of the Original People, and the creator of the Hoshin Project. He has the paope Dashinben, Taikyokuzu, Chusenjin (snow that damages the soul), and Bansenjin. Fearing Joka's revival, he chose to remain and not merge with the earth like the other Original People. He became a human named Ou Eki and approached the Sandai Sennin with the Hoshin Project, becoming Genshi Tenson's disciple. Genshitenson, realizing O Eki's ability to split his soul, divided him into two, returning one to O Eki (who would be traded with Tsuten Kyoshu for Yozen, and would become Otenkun) and keeping the other, eventually placing it in Ryobo, a deceased boy of the Qiang clan (who would become Taikobou). Ou Eki loses his memories of being one of the Original People, and does not regain them until Taikobo and Otenkun merge to create Fukki. After merging, Fukki (who still identifies himself as Taikobo since he is the dominant personality) retains the ability to split, and can return to being Taikobo and Otenkun at will.
Shinnou (神農, Shinnō)
One of the Original People to come to Earth, and the owner of the mysterious Super-paope Kinkouza (Super-paope help user travel through time). He merged with the life of the planet but he could maintain his human form in short amount of time at power spot (power spot are places where natural energy concentrated so Original People as Shinnou can maintain human form in power spot). After Taikobo had defeated Joka, Taikoko found him to ask about dangerous Super-paope Kinkouza's trace. He showed Super-paope Kinkouza with Taikobo and Supushan. Suddenly, he sent Taikobo and Shupushan to the past.
Suiren (燧人)
One of the Original People came to Earth in ancient times. Suijin along with the other Original People battled against Joka and put Joka in an eternal sleep. After all, Suijin chose to merge with the life of the planet.
Shukuyuu (祝融, Shukuyū)
One of the Original People came to Earth in ancients times. Shukuyuu along with the other Original People battled against Joka and put Joka in an eternal sleep. After all, Shukuyuu chose to merge with the life of the planet.
