= Susumu Chiba =

Japanese voice actor

- 千葉 進歩
- Born: September 13, 1970 (age 56); Yokohama, Kanagawa Prefecture, Japan
- Occupation: Voice actor
- Years active: 1996–present
- Agent: Office Osawa
- Height: 177 cm (5 ft 10 in)

Susumu Chiba (千葉 進歩, Chiba Susumu; born September 13, 1970) is a Japanese voice actor. Some of his major roles include Seiji Hayami in Cutie Honey Flash, Chiaki Nagoya in Phantom Thief Jeanne, Sai Fujiwara in Hikaru no Go, Jetfire and Wheeljack in Transformers: Armada, Chairman Muranishi in Kirarin Revolution, Isao Kondo in Gin Tama, Sideways in Transformers: Cybertron, Shō Sai in The Story of Saiunkoku, Hans in Nijū Mensō no Musume, Takuma Ichijo in Vampire Knight, Welkin Gunther in Valkyria Chronicles, and Ryuu Daikouji in Little Battlers Experience. He is currently affiliated with Office Osawa.

== Biography ==
When Chiba was in college, he joined a production company because he was interested in acting and wanted to try something different from his baseball career. At the production company, he studied basic theatrical skills, but rather than studying acting with the aim of becoming an actor, he was more interested in "having fun" with his friends. He was not satisfied with the lessons offered by the production company, and he began to organize study sessions with volunteers. At this point, he was still thinking of acting and work as "separate things." It was not until he moved to Office Osawa, which handles a lot of narration work, that he became fully aware of voice acting as a profession.

His first job involved narrating a commercial. The role that left the deepest impression on him was the role he played in the TV anime Hikaru no Go, as Fujiwara no Sai. Since Chiba had read the original manga, when he heard the news of the anime adaptation, he auditioned wondering who was going to play which role. He later learned that he would be voicing Sai, which felt strange for him. He was very enthusiastic about playing Sai, but on the other hand, he felt that it was not his role. Even when he watched reruns of the anime, Chiba had the feeling that it was not his voice. Although Sai was the role of an insubstantial being, Chiba felt the same way about himself.

== Filmography ==
=== Anime ===
1996

- Case Closed (Detective Tamiya (ep. 130), Yoshihiko Kido (ep. 155), Hiroshi Torimitsu (ep. 383), Nakane (ep. 520), Mr. Mouth (ep. 775), Ryoichi Sazanami (ep. 935), Jun Akimura (ep. 1113))

1997

- Flame of Recca (Saiha)
- Cutie Honey Flash (Seiji Hayami)
- Elf-ban Kakyūsei (Tohru Nagase)

1998

- Pokémon (Wataru, Shingo (ep. 140))
- Serial Experiments Lain (Delivery Guy, ep. 2)
- Sentimental Journey (Matsuoka Shingo, ep. 2)
- Vampire Princess Miyu (Toshihiro, ep. 15)
- YU-NO: A Girl Who Chants Love at the Bound of this World (Takuya Arima)

1999

- A.D. Police: To Protect and Serve (Kenji Sasaki)
- Crest of the Stars (Kufadis)
- Digimon Adventure (Susumu Yagami)
- Gregory Horror Show (Judgment Boy n° 3)
- Hoshin Engi (Yozen)
- Phantom Thief Jeanne (Chiaki Nagoya/Kaitou Sinbad)
- Seraphim Call (Shuuichi, ep. 2)
- Sensual Phrase (Kazuto "Towa" Sakuma)
- To Heart (Teacher, eps. 1, 9)

2000

- The Candidate for Goddess (Hiead Gner)
- Banner of the Stars (Kufadis)
- Ceres, The Celestial Legend (Aki Mikage)
- Labyrinth of Flames (Datenoshin)
- Angel Sanctuary (Rosiel)

2001

- Cyborg 009 (Saeed, ep. 34)
- Earth Maiden Arjuna (News Reporter, ep. 10)
- Zoids: New Century Zero (Leon Toros, Sebastian)
- Angelic Layer (Tomo, ep. 19)
- Shaman King (Blue Chateau, Pino)
- Digimon Tamers (Mitsuo Yamaki)
- Hikaru no Go (Sai Fujiwara)

2002

- Cosplay Complex (Goro Yorozuyo)
- Full Metal Panic! (Takuma Kugayama)
- Rockman EXE (Arashi, Airman, Metalman)
- Kiddy Grade (Yusef, ep. 12)
- Daigunder (Ginzan)
- Demon Lord Dante (Ryo Utsugi)
- Transformers: Armada (Jetfire, Rampage/Wheeljack)
- Tenchi Muyo! GXP (Rajau Ga Waura)

2003

- Popotan (Emcee, ep. 5)
- Superior Defender Gundam Force (Bakenetsumaru)
- Astro Boy (Shibugaki, Man, Bravo)
- Kaleido Star (Yuri Killian)
- Wandaba Style (Michael Hanagata)
- Zatch Bell! (Rodeaux)
- Ultra Maniac (Hiroki Tsujiai)

2004

- Beet the Vandel Buster (Cruss)
- Naruto (Kidomaru)
- Daphne in the Brilliant Blue (Tony Long)
- Mobile Suit Gundam SEED Destiny (Amagi)
- Inuyasha (Mezu)

2005

- Immortal Grand Prix (Frank Bullitt)
- D.I.C.E. (Tak Carter)
- Transformers: Cybertron (Sideways, Tim)
- Saint Seiya (Balron René)
- Sukisho (Matsuri Honjou)
- MÄR (Rolan)
- Genesis of Aquarion (Baron)
- The Law of Ueki (Kilnorton)
- Hell Girl (Yoshiki Fukasawa, ep. 12)
- Black Cat (Preta Ghoul)
- Papa to Kiss in the Dark (Kazuki Hino)

2006

- Bleach (Maki Ichinose)
- The Story of Saiunkoku (Sho Sai)
- Yoake Mae yori Ruri Iro na (Tatsuya Asagiri)
- Gin Tama (Isao Kondo)
- Kirarin Revolution (Chairman Muranishi)
- Buso Renkin (Jinnai)

2007

- Baccano! (Huey Laforet)
- Kotetsushin Jeeg (Kyo Misumi)
- Heroic Age (Rom Ror)
- Wangan Midnight (Kou Tominaga)

2008

- Corpse Princess (Mitsuyoshi (eps. 7-8))
- Sgt. Frog (Shachō Ōhashi, ep. 199)
- Golgo 13 (Young Stage Actor, ep. 34)
- Linebarrels of Iron (Masaki Sugawara)
- Vampire Knight (Takuma Ichijo)

2009

- 07-Ghost (Castor)
- Halo Legends (Cortez)
- Maiden Rose (Taki Reizen)
- Phantom ~Requiem for the Phantom~ (Raymond McGuire)
- Sgt. Frog (Gunpla Spirit, ep. 264)
- Tegami Bachi (Hunt)
- Valkyria Chronicles (Welkin Gunther)

2010

- The Qwaser of Stigmata (Yuri Noda)
- Dance in the Vampire Bund (Ryohei Kuze)
- Koe de Oshigoto! (Nagatoshi Hioki)

2011

- Cardfight!! Vanguard (Tatewaki Naitou)
- Naruto Shippuden (Sabiru, ep. 193)
- Little Battlers Experience (Ryu Daikoji)
- Valkyria Chronicles III (Welkin Gunther)
- Beyblade: Metal Fury (Aguma)

2012

- Horizon in the Middle of Nowhere II (John Hawkins)

2013

- Attack on Titan (Eld Gin)
- Yu-Gi-Oh! Zexal (Mach)
- Valvrave the Liberator (Mitsutoshi Kitagawa (Iori's Father))

2014

- Zetsumetsu Kigu Shōjo Amazing Twins (Hasudō)
- Aldnoah.Zero (Marylcian)
- The Irregular at Magic High School (Naotsugu Chiba)
- Majin Bone (Dark Kraken)

2015

- Attack on Titan: Junior High (Eld Gin)
- Seiyu's Life! (Director of Budha Fighter Bodhisattvon)

2016

- Re:Zero − Starting Life in Another World (Quark (Rem & Ram's Father))
- Time Bokan 24 (Kondō Isami, ep. 20)

2017

- Fate/Apocrypha (Hagen, ep. 3)

2018

- Dakaichi (Tsutomu Kadokura, ep. 7)
- DamenPrince (Evil Spirit, ep. 8)
- Digimon Adventure tri. (Susumu Yagami)
- Devils' Line (Keiji Ochiai)
- IDOLiSH7 (Otoharu Takanashi)
- The Thousand Musketeers (Kyodo Granbird)

2019

- 7 Seeds (Sadao Saruwatari)
- Fire Force (Mirage)
- Pokémon Journeys: The Series (Lance)

2020

- IDOLiSH7: Second Beat! (Otoharu Takanashi)
- A Whisker Away (Yōji Sasaki)

2021

- IDOLiSH7: Third Beat! (Otoharu Takanashi)

2026

- Dandelion (Tamesuke Naitō)

=== Video games ===
- Atelier Totori: The Adventurer of Arland (Marc McBrine)
- Dragalia Lost (Addis)
- Estpolis: The Lands Cursed by the Gods (Artea)
- Growlanser (Carmaine Fallsmeyer)
- Growlanser II: The Sense of Justice (Carmaine Fallsmeyer)
- Higurashi When They Cry (Shingo Fujita)
- Never 7: The End of Infinity (Okuhiko Iida)
- Odin Sphere (Oswald)
- Pandora's Tower (Ende)
- Summon Night EX: Thesis Yoake no Tsubasa (Leonus)
- Tales of Legendia (Will Raynard)
- Tales of Xillia (Yurgen Kitarl)
- Tales of Xillia 2 (Yurgen Kitarl)
- The King of Fighters All Star (Isao Kondo)
- Super Robot Wars UX (Masaki Sugawara)
- Tokimeki Memorial Girl's Side: 3rd Story (Tamao Konno)
- Valkyria Chronicles series (Welkin Gunther)
- Valkyrie Profile (Elder Vampire)
- Wild Arms 4 (Kresnik Ahtreide)

=== Yaoi Games ===
- Cafe Lindbergh (Takamizawa Tsukasa)
- Silver Chaos 1 (Adonis) (Credited as: Progress)
- Artificial Mermaid - Silver Chaos 2 (Yuuri Mimori) (Credited as: Progress)
- Hanamachi Monogatari (Sakuya) (Credited as: Progress)
- Sukisho (Matsuri Honjou)

=== Drama CDs ===
- Ai wa Barairo no Kiss (Reiichi)
- Aka no Shinmon (Vi)
- Amai Kuchizuke (Ayase Hanamura)
- Anata To Koi Ni Ochitai - I want to fall in love with you
- Answer series 1 (Yukio Ikawa)
- Answer series 2 (Yukio Ikawa)
- Big Gun wo Motsu Otoko (Takayanagi Masaki)
- Egoist Prince (Licht)
- Brothers Vol.1
- Chrno Crusade (Adult Chrno)
- Chouhatsu Trap Trap Series no 2 (Shinohara Touya)
- Denkou Sekka Boys (Kitami)
- From Yesterday (Ryuuchi Akane)
- Fushigi Yūgi Genbu Kaiden (Takao Ōsugi)
- Gaki no Ryoubun series 7: Monster Panic
- Gouka Kyakusen de Koi wa Hajimaru series 2 (Helsing)
- Honey Boys Spiral (Yuuna Misaka)
- Innai Kansen (Tomoya Yagi)
- Maiden Rose (Taki Reizen)
- Junjou Romantica Series Junjou Egoist and Junjou Minimum Short dramas (Tsumori)
- Kageki series 2: Kageki ni Dokusenyoku (Zen)
- Kageki series 3: Kageki ni I Love You (Zen)
- Kageki series 5: Kageki ni Tengoku (Zen)
- Kimi ga Koi ni Ochiru (Mochizuki Haru)
- Love & Trust (Kaku Bandou)
- Mahou Gakuen Series 1: Binetsu Club (Maria)
- Mahou Gakuen Series 2: Himitsu Garden (Maria)
- Mahou Gakuen Series 3: Mugen Palace (Maria)
- Mahou Gakuen Series 4: Yuuwaku Lesson (Maria)
- Mahou Gakuen Series side story: Daiundoukai Zenyasai (Maria)
- Milk Crown no Tameiki (Reiji Yukishita)
- Miscast Series (Hiyoshi Tashiro)
- Mizu no Kioku (Touei Kisaragi)
- Muteki na Bokura Series 3: Shoubu wa Korekara! (Akihiro Kanda)
- Muteki na Bokura Series 4: Saikyou na Yatsura (Akihiro Kanda)
- Muteki na Bokura Series side story 1: Aitsu ni Muchuu (Akihiro Kanda)
- Naguru Hakui no Tenshi (Yukina Kisaragi)
- N-Dai Fuzoku Byouin series (Shuuichi Asakura)
- Otokonoko niwa Himitsu ga Aru Series 1 (Chihiro Arisugawa)
- Papa to Mira series 1: Kiss in the Dark (Kazuki Hino)
- Papa to Mira series 2: Loving All Night (Kazuki Hino)
- Papa to Mira series 3: Deep in the Forest (Kazuki Hino)
- Renai Shinan! (Akira Hatano)
- Saikyou no Koibito (Haruka Asagi)
- Shin Megami Tensei III: Nocturne (Demi-fiend)
- Shounika Byoutou he Irasshai series 2: Shounika Byoutou no Kiken na Yoru (Tooru Sawamura)
- Soshite Koi ga Hajimaru (Shigeru Kagatani)
- Tight Rope (Satoya Naoki)
- Tokyo Deep Night (Aoi Tachibana)
- Trap series 1: Renai Trap (Touya Shinohara)
- Trap series 2: Chouhatsu Trap
- Tsuki no Sabaku Satsujin Jiken (Yuuya Kawabata)
- Wagamama Ouji ni Goyoujin (Saeki Takada)
- Weed (Katsushi Wakamiya)
- Yasashikute Toge ga Aru (Masaomi Jinguuji)
- Yogoto Mitsu wa Shitarite 2
- Youma na Oresama to Geboku na Boku (Tokifuyu Tatsumi)
- Yume wa Kirei ni Shidokenaku
- Ze (Asari)

=== Dubbing ===
==== Live-action ====
- Battlestar Galactica (Lee Adama (Jamie Bamber))
- Boy Meets World (Eric Matthews (Will Friedle))
- Bring It On Again (Greg (Bryce Johnson))
- Halo: Nightfall (Horrigan (Luke Neal))
- Jumanji: Welcome to the Jungle (Adult Alex Vreeke (Colin Hanks))
- Moonfall (Albert Hutchings (Stephen Bogaert))
- Numb (Will (Jamie Bamber))

==== Animation ====
- Barbie and the Magic of Pegasus (Aidan)
- Justice League (Wally West/Flash)
