= List of Valkyria Chronicles characters =

The following is a list of major characters of the Sega role-playing video game series Valkyria Chronicles and its related media.

== Creation and conception ==
The characters of the Valkyria Chronicles games were designed by Raita Honjou. For Valkyria Chronicles, the developers aimed for a "rustic" look with the proprietary CANVAS engine Sega created for the game. During the early development process, Raita based his designs more directly on examples from World War II, however they proved to be too modern for what the developers wanted to achieve. Thus, Raita aimed for a motif closer to that found in World War I, first creating Alicia and Welkin's concept illustrations and using them as a basis for the rest of the Gallian cast. World War II influence can still be seen in the designs of Imperial characters such as Gregor, whose uniform is heavily based on German officers' uniforms from that period.

== Main series ==
=== Valkyria Chronicles ===
==== Gallia ====
===== Squad 7 =====
The members of Squad 7 in the anime, posing in front of the Edelweiss. From left to right: Jann Walker, Karl Landzaat, Edy Nelson, Homer Peron, Marina Wulfstan, Aisha Neumann, Emile Bielart, Alicia Melchiott, Welkin Gunther, Isara Gunther with Hans in her arms, Oscar Bielart, Susie Evans, Largo Potter and Brigitte "Rosie" Stark.

Welkin Gunther (ウェルキン・ギュンター, Werukin Gyuntā)
Voiced by (English): Dave Wittenberg
Voiced by (Japanese): Susumu Chiba
Welkin is the 22-year-old main protagonist of Valkyria Chronicles. A university student before the Imperial invasion, Welkin's intelligence and determination earned him command of the Gallian Militia's Squad 7 and the rank of lieutenant. His university major, Animal Sociology, gives him an extensive knowledge of Gallia's native flora and fauna and serves as a basis for his military strategies. Eventually, he falls in love with Alicia Melchiott, whom he marries after defeating Maximillian. Some time later, they have a daughter, who they name Isara in honor of Welkin's deceased sister.
In Valkyria Chronicles II, Welkin moves from Bruhl with Alicia to teach in a town at the southern border of Gallia. At Lanseal Military Academy, he helps his wife in selling her bread whenever he's not teaching or studying nature. He is a hidden character who can be recruited.
Alicia Melchiott (アリシア・メルキオット, Arishia Merukiotto)
Voiced by (English): Colleen O'Shaughnessey
Voiced by (Japanese): Marina Inoue
Alicia is the 19-year-old heroine of the game. Dreaming to become a successful baker, Alicia became a soldier after the Imperial invasion of Gallia. She is a non-commissioned officer with the rank of sergeant in Squad 7 and Welkin's second-in-command. Righteous and reliable, Alicia loves helping others and eventually grows fond of Welkin. She also takes care of Hans, a winged subspecies of pig called a porcavian that becomes the mascot of 7th Platoon. It is revealed later that she is a descendant of the Valkyria. In the anime version, Faldio's attraction to her conflicts with her feelings for Welkin.
In Valkyria Chronicles II, Alicia moves south of Bruhl with Welkin. While her husband teaches at a nearby town, Kluivert, the headmaster of Lanseal Military Academy, allows her to sell her bread at the campus store. Avan, Cosette and Zeri are her first customers. During this time, she is pregnant with her and Welkin's daughter, Isara. Upon meeting Aliasse, Alicia encourages her to use her Valkyrian powers to protect her loved ones. She is a hidden character who can be recruited. Two versions of Alicia can be recruited: one whose appearance and personality are based on her role in the original game and one who is based on her role in the anime adaptation. Due to licensing issues, the anime version of Alicia was removed from the North American version of the game, although voice files still exist in the game's data.
Isara Gunther (イサラ・ギュンター, Isara Gyuntā)
Voiced by (English): Laura Bailey
Voiced by (Japanese): Houko Kuwashima
Isara is Welkin's 16-year-old adopted sister who cares greatly for her comrades. She was taken in by the Gunthers at a young age after a car accident killed her parents. Even though they are not siblings by birth, Isara is extremely devoted to Welkin. Enlisting in the militia as a corporal, she drives and maintains the squad's unique tank, Edelweiss, which her biological father, Theimer, designed and built during the First Europan War but was too expensive to mass-produce. Continuing her father's legacy, Isara is a prodigy when it comes to all things mechanical. The shawl she wears signifies that she is a member of the Darcsens, a race of people persecuted for their purported role in the near destruction of the continent long past. Despite being the subject of racism, she is proud of her heritage and hopes to make a world where Darcsens are no longer persecuted and are treated as people. Isara is killed by Imperial Forces while on a mission, prompting a radical change of heart in Rosie, who witnessed her death. In the honor of her memory, Welkin and Alicia name their daughter after her.
In Valkyria Chronicles II, Isara is a hidden character who can be recruited.
Brigitte "Rosie" Stark (ブリジット・"ロージー"・シュターク, Burijitto "Rōjī" Shutāku)
Voiced by (English): Hedy Burress (VC1); Tara Sands (VC4)
Voiced by (Japanese): Megumi Toyoguchi (game); Junko Minagawa (anime)
Twenty-seven years old, Brigitte was formerly a bar singer who used the stage name "Rosie", and now prefers to be called as such. As a corporal in Squad 7, she acts as its main shocktrooper. Despite her arrogance, she is a capable leader whose tough talk motivates others during battle. Rosie's parents were killed during the First Europan War in a skirmish between Imperial soldiers and Darcsens who had come to their house looking for sanctuary. She holds a deep grudge against all Darcsens because of that, which puts her at odds with Isara and Zaka. Isara's death gives her the impetus to overcomes her prejudice.
In Valkyria Chronicles II, Rosie travels on her tour giving concerts, one of them being attended by Avan and his classmate Vario while they were sneaking off campus. She wrote her hit song, A Love Passed On in honor of Isara. She is a hidden character who can be recruited.
Largo Potter (ラルゴ・ポッテル, Rarugo Potteru)
Voiced by (English): Fred Tatasciore
Voiced by (Japanese): Hisao Egawa (game); Kenji Nomura (anime)
Largo is a gruff, 36-year-old veteran sergeant of the First Europan War who serves as Squad 7's main antitank Lancer. Despite his exemplary service, he has refused promotion time after time, preferring to remain on the frontline. He values experience above everything else on the battlefield, but grows to appreciate Welkin after his strategies prove successful. Beyond his tough exterior, he holds a special appreciation for fresh vegetables from his childhood on his father's farm. It is revealed that he knew Captain Varrot when she first enlisted and that he had feelings for her then and now.
In Valkyria Chronicles II, Largo is a hidden character who can be recruited.
Zaka (ザカ, Zaka)
Voiced by (English): Steve Blum
Voiced by (Japanese): Kazuya Nakai
Zaka, a 33-year-old local leader of the Darcsens, was held in an Imperial work camp where he and his people were forced to work in the dangerous ragnite mines and factories under brutal conditions imposed by Berthold Gregor. He proves instrumental in helping Squad 7 in the Fouzen raid. Joining the group as a sergeant shortly after the battle, he commands the Shamrock, a customized version of Gallia's main battle tank. His easygoing demeanor hides the scars of the oppression he has experienced all his life. In the anime version, he tends to flirt with Rosie, to her initial dismay.
In Valkyria Chronicles II, Zaka is a hidden character who can be recruited.

===== Edelweiss =====
Edelweiss is a unique tank operated by Welkin Gunther and his adopted sister Isara Gunther. Originally designed by Isara's father, Theimer, for operation during the First Europan War, the vehicle served under the command of General Belgen Gunther. The Edelweiss would be maintained as a legacy by Isara in the memory of both men. Though the design would never be mass produced due to the expense of the design, Edelweiss would again see combat in Bruhl and be inducted into Squad 7 as the command vehicle of Welkin Gunther. The vehicle would serve in this role as a command vehicle providing Squad 7 throughout the Second Europan War and achieve success in both conventional and unconventional battlefields that other Gallian vehicles would have been unsuccessful in accomplishing.
The Edelweiss appears in Valkyria Chronicles 4 as a unlockable vehicle through completion of DLC missions. The vehicle has also additionally in other entries to the series to a limited degree as many vehicles in Valkyria Chronicles 2 take inspiration from the Edelweiss, as well as the parts of the Vehicle being researchable in Valkyria Chronicles 3. Additionally, Edelweiss has appeared in Phantasy Star Online 2 as a furniture item, and World of Tanks as a premium vehicle.

===== Squad 7, Edy Detachment =====
The six main characters of the DLC "Edy's Mission: Enter the Edy Detachment". All of those listed below, with the exception of Lynn, are also present as members of Squad 7 in the anime. The members of Edy's detachment can be unlocked as recruitable, but hidden characters in Valkyria Chronicles II.
Edy Nelson (イーディ・ネルソン, Īdi Neruson)
Voiced by (English): Megan Hollingshead
Voiced by (Japanese): Yui Kano
Edy is a 17-year-old militia shocktrooper. Growing up in a tiny rural town, she had dreams of becoming a famous actress. Unfortunately, she lacks coping skills as she cannot forgive anyone who steals the spotlight from her. She has a one-sided rivalry with Rosie, who she thinks is preventing her rise to fame. She is extremely tone-deaf and her singing ability is so poor that it can incapacitate those who hear it – a running gag in the story. She proved to be one of the most popular characters in the game and the development staff turned her and Homer into official spokesmen for the Valkyria Chronicles franchise on the "Front Line Journal" blog. She is also the central character of "Edy's Mission: Enter the Edy Detachment", where she and five other members of 7th Platoon defend a small village from a large group of Imperial invaders.
Edy's younger sister, Anisette, is a main character in Valkyria Chronicles II.
Homer Peron (ホーマー・ピエローニ, Hōmā Pierōni)
Voiced by: Umeka Shouji
Homer is a kind and pretty 15-year-old boy with a frail constitution who serves in Squad 7 as an engineer. While his countenance is angelic, his mind occasionally shows a devilish twist as he is a masochist. He is in love with Edy and enjoys being beaten by her during her numerous indignant outbursts. Edy notes that he is "so pretty, so broken." He and Edy serve as mascots and spokesmen for Valkyria Chronicles on the series's official blog. In the Japanese version of the game and anime his surname is 'Pieroni'.
After the official Valkyria Chronicles blog, the one that usually has Edy and Homer talking to each other, celebrated its 100th post, it was revealed that Homer has an older sister, which Edy was shocked to learn about. It was later revealed that his older sister, Leila, will be a main character in Valkyria Chronicles III.
Susie Evans (スージー・エヴァンス, Sūjī Evansu)
Voiced by: Rie Todzuka
Susie is a 19-year-old scout. The daughter of a frontier tycoon, she is a pacifist, but was forced to join the militia for the sake of her family's honor. Fundamentally opposed to war, she finds killing loathsome but she will set aside her pacifism to protect her friends and comrades. In the anime version, she is a friend of Alicia within the Bruhl Town Watch and joins the Gallian Militia along with her.
Lynn (リィン, Ryin)
Voiced by: Miyuki Kawashou
Lynn is a 20-year-old Darcsen shocktrooper and one of the unlockable characters in the game. Although she originally went into hiding from Imperial Darcsen Hunters, the news of her lover, Karl Landzaat, being injured in combat prompts her to join the militia to protect him. A quick learner, she becomes one of the squad's best shocktroopers despite not having any prior military training. She became friends with Isara after hearing the young girl's dream of a world where Darcsens are no longer persecuted. She is only seen briefly in the anime version's epilogue.
Jann Walker
Voiced by: Keiji Hirai
Jann is an openly gay 27-year-old Lancer. Flamboyant and strong, he enjoys being in the company of muscular men, especially his crush, Largo. Having been a babysitter before enlisting, he acts like a mother hen to the younger members of the squad and becomes very protective of them when harm threatens.
Marina Wulfstan
Voiced by: Ryo Agawa (Natsuki Dai)
Marina is a 24-year-old Sniper. One of the best in the game, her incredible marksmanship was taught to her by her father since childhood. An aloof character, she prefers to be alone, yet has feelings for cute animals like Hans. Despite her rather unsocial attitude, she does show her emotions to her comrades in the Edy Detachment when all six of them fight together against the Imperials. Her reason for joining the militia was to protect those who could not protect themselves.

===== Additional Squad 7 characters in the anime =====
Aisha Neumann
Voiced by: Kanae Itō (game); Hikari Inoue (anime)
At age 12, Aisha is easily the youngest shocktrooper in the Gallian Militia. Even though Gallian Conscription laws allows only those 16 years old and older to join, Aisha was made an exception due to her credentials. Considered a prodigy, her impressive intellect and stamina make her a good soldier, yet deep down she is still a little girl. She tends to refer to herself in third person.
In Valkyria Chronicles II, Aisha is a hidden character who can be recruited.
Karl Landzaat
Voiced by: Takahiko Sakaguma
Karl is a 23-year-old engineer who joins the Militia after the Imperials invade Fouzen. Even though he is afraid to fight in the face of danger, he nevertheless continues to fight for a peaceful future with his Darcsen lover, Lynn.
In Valkyria Chronicles II, Karl is a hidden character who can be recruited.
Oscar Bielert
Voiced by: Mariko Tonomura
Oscar is a 15-year-old sniper and Emile's older brother. He originally joined the militia to keep his brother safe but if Oscar is wounded in combat in the game, Emile joins the militia. If this happens, he tries to act strong in front of Emile despite actually being quite timid.
In Valkyria Chronicles II, Oscar is a hidden character who can be recruited.
Emile Bielert
Voiced by: Aiko Hibi
Emile is a 15-year-old sniper and Oscar's younger brother and one of the unlockable characters in the game. Despite his poor health, he enlists after hearing Oscar is injured. Feeling he is a burden to his brother, he tries to be helpful as much as he can.
In Valkyria Chronicles II, Emile is a hidden character who can be recruited.

===== Squad 1 characters from the anime =====
These characters originally appear as recruits for Welkin's Squad 7 in the game but are members of Faldio's Squad 1 in the anime.
Cezary Regard
Cezary is a 23-year-old sniper. A cynical man with a prejudice against Darcsens, he is nevertheless a talented sniper, a position he chose in order to stay away from the front lines. In the manga, his attitude becomes much softer after developing a relationship with the Darcsen engineer, Nadine, when the latter believed the former saved her from an enemy sniper.
Salinas Milton
Voiced by: Daisuke Matsubara
Salias is a 24-year-old shocktrooper. Handsome and smooth, he is rather popular with the ladies. He is a major tank aficionado, and the chance to be close to one is why he joined the Gallian militia in the first place.
Herbert Nielsen
Voiced by: Kazuya Matsumura
Herbert is an 18-year-old engineer. He grew up in a farm where he became a talented horse rider so he wouldn't walk that much. A very lazy and capricious man, he refuses to do work unless motivated.
Nils Daerden
Nils is a 29-year-old Lancer. Growing up in the seedy underbelly of the capital city of Randgriz, Nils was a feared gangster who remained undefeated in countless turf wars. A burly, rugged and stoic man, he rarely shows his emotions. After the Second Europan War, he becomes the head of Gallia's underworld, enforcing his own code of honor in concert with the government.
Wendy Cheslock
Wendy is a 25-year-old shocktrooper. A shut-in inventor who loves explosions, she applied to become a shocktrooper in the militia in order to try her bombs which sometimes scare her squad mates due to their lethal potency. After the Second Europan War, she works at the Gallian National Arsenal developing explosives.
Rosina Selden
Rosina is a 24-year-old Lancer. A woman with red hair and brown skin, she is a bodybuilder who enjoys working out. She looks down on Darcsens but only because she feels they need to work out more due to their slender figures. Nevertheless, she is well loved by her 7th Platoon comrades as an older sister figure whom they affectionately call "Lady Rose."

==== Gallian Militia ====
Eleanor Varrot (エレノア・バーロット, Erenoa Bārotto)
Voiced by (English): Julia Fletcher
Voiced by (Japanese): Atsuko Tanaka
A cool and collected woman, Eleanor is the captain of Gallia's Militia and Welkin's direct superior. She is a veteran of the First Europan War, where she served alongside Largo as a sniper. Eleanor is a Captain and shares a deep bond with Squad 7, ensuring they are in top condition at all times. She is often contends with General Damon of the Regular Army, who looks down on the Militia's soldiers as base and unrefined.
In Valkyria Chronicles II, Eleanor is a hidden character who can be recruited.
Faldio Landzaat (ファルディオ・ランツァート, Farudio Rantsāto)
Voiced by (English): Robin Atkin Downes
Voiced by (Japanese): Takahiro Sakurai
Faldio is one of Welkin's former university classmates who studied archaeology and the commander of the Gallian Militia's Squad 1. After examining desert ruins built by the Valkyrur, he gains an intense interest in Valkyrur history and the Darcsen Calamity. This interest slowly turns into obsession, however, as he desperately searches for a means by which the war with the Empire can be won. Faldio's interaction with Squad 7 is much more frequent in the anime adaptation of the series, especially concerning Alicia, for whom he is shown to have romantic feelings. Later in the anime, all the members of Squad I were killed by Selvaria making him the sole survivor. He died while helping Welkin to escape to rescue Alicia.
In Valkyria Chronicles II, he is a hidden character who can be recruited.
Ramal Valt (ラマル・ヴァルト, Ramaru Varuto)
Voiced by: Makoto Naruse
Valt is Faldio's extremely loyal and protective subordinate in the anime version. He is shown to have a crush on Isara, but repeatedly denies it early on out of embarrassment. He dies saving Faldio from Selvaria.
He makes an appearance in Valkyria Chronicles II as a recruitable, but hidden soldier. Due to licensing issues, he was removed from the North American version of the game although voice files still exist in the game data.
Calvaro Rodriguez (カレルヴォ・ロドリゲス, Kareruvo Rodorigesu)
Voiced by: Yukimasa Kishino
Rodriguez is the loud, strict, and determined drill instructor of the Gallian Militia's training facilities. While constantly debasing the trainees verbally, he is genuinely appreciative of the accomplishments they achieve. After Valkyria Chronicles, Rodriguez leaves the Militia boot camp in the charge of 7th Platoon assault trooper Jane Turner. He later takes on a position similar to his previous one at Lanseal Royal Military Academy.

===== Valkyria Chronicles: Wish Your Smile =====
Mintz
Mintz is a Darcsen orphan and an engineer in the Gallian army. He is a hidden recruitable soldier in Valkyria Chronicles II. Due to licensing issues, he is inaccessible in the North American version of the game. Using cheatcodes, Mintz is accessible only if the player overwrites the game's memory of another character.
Julius Klose
Klose is a sniper in the Gallian army. He is a hidden, recruitable soldier in Valkyria Chronicles II. Due to licensing issues, he is inaccessible in the North American version of the game. Using cheatcodes, Julius is accessible only if the player overwrites the game's memory of another character.

===== Civilians =====
Irene Ellet (イレーヌ・エレット, Irēnu Eretto)
Voiced by (English): Kari Wahlgren
Voiced by (Japanese): Naomi Shindō
Ellet is a 25-year-old reporter and correspondent for the GBS radio station who is always out for the latest scoop. At the onset of the Second Europan War, Ellet collected information for both the Federation and Empire. After Gallia is invaded, however, she attaches herself to Squad 7 as a war correspondent for the Militia, wanting to bring the uncensored truth to the people. She is the narrator character of Valkyria Chronicles, using her married name Irene Koller.
Roald Kankkunen
Voiced by: Shingo Horii
A former officer who served Gallia during the First Europan War, Roald Kankkunen now spends much of his time visiting the graves of his fallen EWI comrades at the war cemetery in Randgriz. Upon meeting Welkin, he offers to teach the young man various Orders. His file implies that he had served with Welkin's father during EWI. At the time, he was the head of a Gallian Army cavalry unit.

===== Royalty and Nobility =====
Cordelia gi Randgriz (コーデリア・ギ・ランドグリーズ, Kōderia gi Randogurīzu)
Voiced by (English): Kate Higgins
Voiced by (Japanese): Mamiko Noto
Cordelia is the sixteen-year-old Royal Princess of Gallia, scion of the Randgriz royal family which has traces of the mysterious Valkyria in its lineage. After her parents died, she ascended to the throne, though she was not formally crowned due to her young age. Very reserved in nature, she entrusts much of the affairs of state to her Viceroy, Maurits von Borg. However, after a foiled kidnapping attempt, Cordelia's demeanor begins to change and she eventually becomes more self-confident as a leader. During Maximillian's assault on Gallia, she reveals that she is not a Valkyria, but a Darcsen.
In Valkyria Chronicles II Cordelia becomes the Archduchess of Gallia and reveals the truth of her lineage to everyone. While some accept the truth, others were shocked in horror and refused to be ruled by a Darcsen. She is then forced to fight in a civil war against the Gallian Revolutionary Army. After the rebels defeated Lanseal, Randgriz fell and Cordelia is taken captive by Gilbert Gassenarl. However, when Class G begins to launch successful key counterattacks, she is saved by the Gallian Army as they retake the capital. She then personally leads the navy to help Avan and his friends in their final battle against Baldren. After his defeat, she has all of the remaining rebels surrender and personally attends Class G's graduation.
Maurits von Borg (マウリッツ・ヴォン・ボルグ, Mauritsu von Borugu)
Voiced by (English): Dwight Schultz
Voiced by (Japanese): Hidekatsu Shibata
Borg is the Prime Minister of Gallia. He is the true ruler of Gallia, manipulating events behind the scenes while Cordelia's role has been reduced to that of a figurehead. Using his influence, Borg attempts to manipulate the course of the war via political maneuvering with both the Federation and Empire for his own gain. Eventually, Borg is killed at the hands of Maximillian.
Georg von Damon (ゲオルグ・ヴォン・ダモン, Georugu von Damon)
Voiced by (English): John Di Maggio
Voiced by (Japanese): Kōzō Shioya
Damon is the General of the Gallian Regular Army. An aristocrat who gained his position using family connections, he is a venal coward who looks down at the Gallian Militia and sees them as worthless scum compared to his Regular Army. Due to his crippling incompetence in battle, half of Gallia rapidly fell under Imperial control, and he is incensed after the tide is turned only with the intervention of Militia forces. Damon's indignation centers mainly on Squad 7, whom he orders out on suicide missions to use them as cannon fodder before his own forces claim victory. However, Damon is eventually killed at the hands of Selvaria after she is captured.

===== Other =====
Three characters from the video game Skies of Arcadia make cameo appearances in the game: Vyse and Aika can be recruited as playable characters, Shocktrooper and Scout respectively. The Medic of Squad 7 is Fina, but it's not stated in her Personnel file until the game is completed.

All three appear as an unlockable sicker in Valkyria Chronicles II and can be recruited as hidden, unlockable characters in Valkyria Chronicles II.

Fina makes a cameo appearance as Squad 7's medic in the anime while Vyse makes a cameo appearance as a member of Squad 7 in the second episode of Valkyria Chronicles III's OVA.

==== Empire ====
From left to right: Selvaria Bles, Maximilian Gaius Von Reginrave, Berthold Gregor and Radi Jaeger.

Maximilian (マクシミリアン, Makushimirian)
Voiced by (English): Matthew Yang King
Voiced by (Japanese): Jun Fukuyama
Maximillian is the main antagonist of Valkyria Chronicles. An ambitious 29-year-old at the forefront of the Imperial invasion, Maximilian is an Imperial prince, second in line of succession to the Imperial throne, and absolute commander of the Empire's occupation forces in Gallia. His strategies revolve around using massive force to crush the Gallian opposition, including super weapons such as huge land battleships and Selvaria's Valkyrian abilities. Directly under him are the Drei Stern, his hand-picked generals. In the anime version, his full name is Maximilian Gaius Von Reginrave. His ultimate goal is to use the Valkyria's power to rule Gallia. However, Maximillian is killed in the final battle with Squad 7.
In Valkyria Chronicles II, he is a hidden character who can be recruited.
Selvaria Bles (セルベリア・ブレス, Seruberia Buresu)
Voiced by (English): April Stewart (VC1); Carrie Keranen (VC4)
Voiced by (Japanese): Sayaka Ohara
Selvaria is a 22-year-old proud, noble, yet distant woman who serves Maximilian with absolute loyalty as a part of the Drei Stern. The blood of the legendary Valkyria flows in her veins, granting her superhuman powers in battle when she wields an artifact ragnite spear and shield. At a young age she was held at an Imperial research facility, used as a test subject in their experiments until Maximilian rescued her. In the anime version, it is revealed that Maximilian named Selvaria after a blue flower of the same name. After being captured by Gallian forces in Ghirlando, Selvaria sacrifices herself, annihilating the fortress and most of Gallia's main forces with it.
She is recruitable as a hidden character in Valkyria Chronicles II. Selvaria is known to be in the game as a pre-order bonus. Selvaria later appears as an antagonist character in the crossover title Project X Zone, opposing Kurt, Riela and Imca from Valkyria Chronicles III.
Berthold Gregor (ベルホルト・グレゴール, Beruhoruto Guregōru)
Voiced by (English): Roger L. Jackson
Voiced by (Japanese): Chikao Ōtsuka
Gregor is a 51-year-old Drei Stern general. The oldest general, Berthold is level-headed yet merciless, feared even amongst the Imperials for his brutality and lack of compassion even for his own troops. He runs a Darcsen labor camp in the occupied ragnite mining city of Fouzen, forcing those interred there to live and work in inhumane conditions. He suffers from a leg injury given to him by Jaeger during the First Europan War when they fought on opposing sides. Eventually, Gregor is killed when Squad 7 destroys his armored train, Esen.
Radi Jaeger (ラディ・イェーガー, Radi Yēgā)
Voiced by (English): Patrick Seitz
Voiced by (Japanese): Akio Ōtsuka
Radi is a thirty-six-year-old Drei Stern general. He is a bit of a rake who puts an emphasis on chivalry in battle and respects those who do the same. He commands a customized tank named Lupus as leader of the Empire's elite armored unit. He fought against the Empire when his country was invaded during the First Europan War, but was defeated by Gregor and then released by Maximilian to join the ranks of the Drei Stern. Jaeger does not fight for the Empire out of loyalty, but rather to help his own country gain independence through Maximilian's victory. Unlike the other Drei Stern generals, Jaeger survives in his final battle against Squad 7. He then leaves the Empire, presumably returning to his homeland of Fhirald. In the anime, he is shot by Maximilian for insubordination, but in the epilogue it is revealed he survived, as he can be seen during the walking in the train station dressed as a civilian refugee.
Johann Oswald Eisen
Voiced by: Hiroshi Okamoto
Johann is an Imperial Engineer from the DLC Side Story Chapter Selvaria's Mission: Behind Her Blue Flame. A loyal yet fainthearted soldier afraid of fighting on the front lines, he later gets strength and confidence after becoming Selvaria's personal engineer. Selvaria inspires Johann to believe in himself and he sees the kinder side of the General. In the Japanese version, his given name was originally Karl, but was changed in the English version to Johann to avoid confusion with Karl Landzaat, a Gallian Militiaman who is also an Engineer.
In the anime, Johann/Karl's occupation is changed to a second lieutenant who is assigned as deputy to Selvaria Bles by Imperial High Command as part of a plot. He becomes loyal to the Drei Stern after Jaeger and Bles save him during an assassination attempt against Maximilian. He later confronts Maximilian in anger over the latter's lack of remorse to Selvaria's death. He is executed by Maximilian before he can finish his speech.

=== Valkyria Chronicles II ===
==== Gallia ====
===== Lanseal Royal Military Academy =====
Class G of the Lanseal Royal Military Academy. (Back row) L-R: Joachim Osen, Helmut Bourdais, Raymond Moen, Alexis Hilden, Rene Randall, Randy Hansum, Heinz Gilden, Jamill Caines (Third row) L-R: Reiner Tristan, Inghild Noverre, Morris Lling, Noel Willoch, Marion Siegbahn, Mischlitt, Magari, Jugin, Sofia Collins, Franca Martin (Second row) L-R: Nahum Dryer, Coleen Celsius, Anisette Nelson, Erik Kampmann, Sigrid Eissel, Chloe Blixen, Vicky Baytear, Pete Stang (Front row) L-R: Hubert Brixham, Lavinia Lane, Lotte Netzel, Zeri, Avan Hardins, Cosette Coalhearth, Nichol Martin, Vario Kraatz, Melissa Dalen

Avan Hardins (アバン・ハーデンス, Aban Hādensu)
Voiced by (English): Jason Spisak
Voiced by (Japanese): Hiroyuki Yoshino
Avan is an energetic, adaptable young man and the main protagonist of Valkyria Chronicles II. Born and raised in the southern Gallian town of Mellvere, Avan lived a fairly typical life working and attending high school. As a child, he looked up to his older brother Leon, who had excelled as a member of the nation's militia forces. However, the sudden news of Leon's death in December 1936 ignites his passion, after which he enrolls at Lanseal and is assigned to Class G. After his graduation, Avan travels throughout Gallia, helping to restore towns that were destroyed during the war. Avan makes some appearances in Valkyria Chronicles III and is an unlockable character as well.
Cosette Coalhearth (コゼット・コールハース, Kozetto Kōruhāsu)
Voiced by (English): Janice Kawaye
Voiced by (Japanese): Eri Kitamura
Cosette is a young woman who is training to become a doctor and serves as a medic and engineer in Lanseal Academy's Class G. Her bright countenance and earnest effort set the mood for those around her, but her occasional clumsiness can end up making trouble for herself and others. While eager to help, Cosette is unprepared for the cruel realities of war and further hampered by past trauma. After witnessing the death of her parents, Cosette suffers from color blindness and a severe fear of blood, though she eventually overcomes her fear thanks to Avan. When she graduates, Cosette enters medical school with a full scholarship. Cosette makes some appearances in Valkyria Chronicles III and is an unlockable character as well.
Zeri (ゼリ)
Voiced by (English): Crispin Freeman
Voiced by (Japanese): Hiroshi Kamiya
Along with Avan and Cosette, the cool and intellectual Zeri makes up a part of the core of Class G. After enrollment he was assigned duty as an assault trooper. His meticulously maintained uniform is offset by a bandanna tied to its left sleeve, the pattern woven into it marking his Darcsen heritage. His goal is to become a hero and to end the persecution aimed toward the Darcsen people. During Juliana's last moments, Zeri gives hints that he might have romantic feelings for her. After graduating, he joins the Gallian Army and becomes a lieutenant, earning respect from his peers. Zeri makes some appearances in Valkyria Chronicles III and is an unlockable character as well.
Anisette Nelson
Voiced by: Yui Kano
Known as Licorice Nelson (リコリス・ネルソン, Rikorisu Neruson) in the original Japanese version, Anisette is the younger sister of Edy and an assault trooper in Class G. Following in her sister's footsteps, Anisette aims to become a famous "Super Idol", studying song and dance in her spare time. Compared to her sister, she is very talented in singing but lacks physical stamina.
She is an unlockable character in Valkyria Chronicles III.
Juliana Everhart (ユリアナ・エーベルハルト, Yuriana Ēberuharuto)
Voiced by (English): Karen Strassman
Voiced by (Japanese): Ryōko Shiraishi
Juliana is the daughter and heiress of the noble Everhart family. Having received top-class private education and inclusion in programs for gifted children, Juliana's entrance into Lanseal was a natural result. As class representative of the elite Class A, her prideful nature quickly makes her and those under her wing rivals for those in Class G, especially Zeri because he is a Darcsen. She views the soldiers under her command strictly as pawns who, without her guidance, would be useless according to her. However, after losing to Class G in the Laevatien Cup finals, Juliana learns to place trusts in her friends and comrades.
She and Leon were part of a secret experiment of the academy called Project Vahalla where they were transformed into artificial Valkyrur. When Lanseal is attacked by the rebels, Juliana unleashes her powers to defend the academy, but she is severely wounded by Dirk. She makes amends with Zeri, giving hints that she had fallen in love with him. She then gives him her bracelet as a good-luck charm before dying in his arms. Juliana makes an appearance in Valkyria Chronicles III and is an unlockable character as well.
Lawrence Kluivert (ローレンス・クライファート, Rōrensu Kuraifāto)
Voiced by (English): David Anthony Pizzuto
Voiced by (Japanese): Takeshi Aono
Kluivert is the president of Lanseal Royal Military Academy. His family has been a part of Gallia's military for generations, and high expectations were placed on him to also ascend to a high office. However, an accident wounded his arm, preventing him from continuing on that path. Despite this, Kluivert continued to apply his military skills as a Gallian Army staff officer for many years, eventually leading to his selection as head of Lanseal.
In order to gain power to defend Gallia, Kluivert brought Foerster to the academy and together they formed Project Vahalla, providing her with students that were adequate enough to undergo her experiments and become Valkyrur. After Dirk stole all of the project's data, Kluivert's secrets are exposed to Avan and Hubert. Feeling that Lanseal had lost the war, he locks himself up alone in one of the laboratories and commits suicide by shooting himself.
Hubert Brixham
Voiced by (English): Travis Willingham
Voiced by (Japanese): Ryōtarō Okiayu
Known as Huber Bricksom (ユベール・ブリクサム, Yubēru Burikusamu) in the original Japanese version. Formerly a notable soldier, Hubert was forced to quit his position after a battlefield injury led to a severe eye infection. Afterwards he became an instructor at Lanseal Academy and currently teaches the students of Class G. His manner of speech often evokes a cold and strict nature. However, he truly cares for his students and wishes for all of them to do their best in both school and battle. When his students receive orders to enter combat, Hubert takes on the role of Class G Squad's commanding officer. He also serves as the narrator for the game. After defeating the rebels, Hubert rebuilds Lanseal and continues to work as a professor, denying the occupation of its headmaster. Hubert makes some appearances in Valkyria Chronicles III and is an unlockable character as well.
Clementia Foerster (クレメンティア・フェルスター, Kurementia Ferusutā)
Voiced by (English): Jeannie Elias
Voiced by (Japanese): Mami Koyama
Clementia is a scientist who is often seen on Academy grounds in a white doctor's coat. Possessing a deep knowledge of the Valkyrur, she's made a name for herself in regard to research on artificial Valkyria. Her presence at the Academy initially is a mystery to the cast. She acts as a sort of foster parent to Aliasse, but treats her strictly as a weapon and holds no true feelings of compassion to her. Her goal is to perfect the recreation of the power of the Valkyria, even at the expense of human life. It is likely that she used to work for the Empire and it is hinted that Selvaria Bles from the first game also made part of her research.
Clementia made a short appearance in the anime adaptation of Valkyria Chronicles, but was not featured in the first game. However, she returns in Valkyria Chronicles III, and upon meeting Riela, she realizes that she is a Valkyria and provides her lance and shield, hoping that she eventually confronts Selvaria as part of her research.
Aliasse (エイリアス, Eiriasu)
Voiced by (English): Amber Hood
Voiced by (Japanese): Haruka Tomatsu
Aliasse is a pure blooded Valkyrian who wields a shield and a whip-shaped spear. In battle, she appears to adopt a playful, yet psychotic personality, reveling in destruction. She considers Clementia Foerster to be her mother, calling her "Mama". After spending some time with Avan and his friends, she grows fond of them and refuses to leave their side when Clementia decided to move from the academy and joins Class G as a scout instead. After graduating, Aliasse lives with Cosette and attends a horticultural school to learn to grow flowers.
Aliasse is an unlockable character in Valkyria Chronicles III.
Lavinia Lane (ラビニア・レイン, Rabinia Rein)
Voiced by: Satomi Satou
Lavinia Lane is the 21-year-old tank pilot of Lanseal. She works in the R&D building as well and develops weapons. In her post-game story mission, it is revealed that she was once defeated by the Ghost Tank, a legendary rebel tank that barely anyone survives an encounter with. However, Avan's brother Leon, who was at the academy at that time, told her to build a better tank, try again and not give up hope. With the help of Class G, she finally stares down her demons and defeats the Ghost Tank. She cries tears of joy at this victory and also hints that she had fallen in love with Leon. After this, she earns the Tank Mastery potential and when it is activated, she says, "A dozen Ghost Tanks couldn't stop me!" indicating that she is no longer afraid to face powerful foes.

==== Gallian Revolutionary Army ====
The main antagonists of Valkyria Chronicles II, the Gallian Revolutionary Army (GRA) is a rebel force who intends to overthrow the Gallian government, taking advantage of lingering anti-Darcsen sentiment after Archduchess Cordelia's revelation of being a Darcsen herself. With the Regular Army still recuperating from the failed Imperial invasion two years before and the Militia disbanded, the cadets from Landseal Academy, most notably Class G, are usually summoned to fight them.

Gilbert Gassenarl (ギルベルト・ガッセナール, Giruberuto Gassenāru)
Voiced by (English): Greg Baldwin
Voiced by (Japanese): Banjō Ginga
Gilbert is the Generalissimo and mastermind of the GRA. In society he holds the title of Count and heads the noble Gassenarl family. However, Gilbert is killed shortly after taking the throne as the Archduke by Baldren, who disagreed with his plans to have Gallia allying itself with the Atlantic Federation as well as ending the Darcsen purge.
Baldren Gassenarl (バルドレン・ガッセナール, Barudoren Gassenāru)
Voiced by (English): Liam O'Brien
Voiced by (Japanese): Hikaru Midorikawa
Gilbert Gassenarl's eldest son, Baldren is the commander of the GRA's infantry forces. To recreate Gallia in what he believes is a purer light, he operates with cool efficiency in the expulsion of Darcsens while refusing to lose the sovereignty of Gallia to the Atlantic Federation but rescinded on when he realized the battle was lost. He makes his last stand after an attempt to escape to Federation territory failed. Using the stolen data from Lanseal, Baldren transforms himself into a Valkyria to fight Class G, but is soundly defeated. With his dying breath, he mocks them that they would have a hard time defending Gallia with their own hands. Baldren then dies as his ship is destroyed. Baldren appears in Valkyria Chronicles III and is an unlockable character as well.
Audrey Gassenarl (オドレイ・ガッセナール, Odorei Gassenāru)
Voiced by (English): Ali Hillis
Voiced by (Japanese): Ayako Kawasumi
The second of Gilbert Gassenarl's three children, Audrey is a devout believer in Yggdism, a religion that worships the Valkyrians as gods. During her service in the Gallian Army, Imperial soldiers fearfully gave her the alias "Battle Maiden of the Iron Horse", given her knowledge of armored warfare. It proves essential in her assuming command of the GRA's mechanized units, leading the battle from her personal steed, the Geirolul. She is killed in combat against the Academy forces at Anthold when the aqueduct was destroyed, causing her tank to be washed away and destroyed shortly after.
Dirk Gassenarl (ディルク・ガッセナール, Diruku Gassenāru)/Leon Hardins
Voiced by (English): Troy Baker
Voiced by (Japanese): Sōichirō Hoshi
The youngest of the Gassenarl children, Dirk is the commander of the GRA's special forces units. Mystery surrounds him as not only is he very taciturn, but also constantly conceals himself in an armor suit developed under the Artificial Valkyria program, an initiative to assemble a force of armored soldiers harnessing Valkyria powers. Dirk is eventually revealed to be Avan's brother, Leon, during the rebel attack on Lanseal when Juliana knocks off his helmet. He became an artificial Valkyria alongside Juliana in Project Vahalla, wanting power to protect his family. At the Anthold harbor, Dirk tries to defeat Class G while Baldren makes his way to the Federation. However he is defeated by Aliasse and regains his mind as Leon. After revealing the whole truth and knowing Avan will be alright without him, Leon dies peacefully in his younger brother's arms. Leon appears in Valkyria Chronicles III and is an unlockable character as well.

==== Other ====
Emilia Percival from Phantasy Star Portable 2 is available as a melee class secret character. However, in order to obtain her, the player must have a PSP2 save file on the PSP memory stick. Doing so also unlocks access to extra tank customization stickers and two special missions.

=== Valkyria Chronicles III ===
==== Gallia ====
===== Squad 422 (The "Nameless") =====
Group photo of Squad 422 as seen in Valkyria Chronicles III.

Squad 422, also known as "The Nameless" (ネームレス, Nēmuresu), is a unit of the Gallian Army and the main protagonists of Valkyria Chronicles 3. It is a penal military unit composed of deserters, criminals and military offenders whose real names are erased from the records and referred to instead by numbers (hence their nickname). Some, on the other hand, were recruited into the Squad after being guaranteed a generous compensation. Despite being used by the Gallian military to take on the dirty work and most dangerous missions that neither the Regular Army nor Militia will do, the 422nd is nevertheless up to the task, exemplified by their motto, "Altaha Abilia" ("Always Ready" in Latin).

====== Main characters ======
No.07 Kurt Irving (クルト･アーヴィング, Kuruto Āvingu)
Voiced by: Yuichi Nakamura

Kurt is the male protagonist of Valkyria Chronicles III. Kurt is a former army officer and Lanseal graduate who was accused of treason before being transferred to The Nameless. Kurt hopes to clear his name and return to the regular military by leading The Nameless. He has the habit of eating sweets while thinking on a strategy and likes to cook, gathering ingredients from the places he travels to improve his recipes. Kurt later appears in the crossover title Project X Zone as a playable character with Riela as his partner.

No.13 Riela Marceris (リエラ・マルセリス, Riera Maruserisu)
Voiced by: Aya Endō

Riela is the one of main co-heroines of Valkyria Chronicles III. Riela is a young woman who initially is unaware of being a descendant of the Valkyria. During her time in the regular army, Riela became infamous as the lone survivor of many wiped-out army squadrons and is now viewed as a jinx on whatever unit she is assigned to, thus earning the nickname "Grim Reaper" and being transferred to the Nameless. Later she falls in love with Kurt and becomes one of his love interests. Riela later appears in the crossover title Project X Zone as a playable character with Kurt as her partner.

No.01 Imca (イムカ, Imuka)
Voiced by: Masumi Asano

Imca is the one of main co-heroines of Valkyria Chronicles III. Known as No.01 (or Ace), Imca is a Darcsen Heavy Weapon specialist whose village was destroyed by the Imperial Valkyria, and joins The Nameless to seek revenge against her. She usually avoids contact with the other members of the squad, until Kurt and Riela join up to help her become more sociable. Later she falls in love with Kurt and becomes one of his love interests. Imca later appears in the crossover title Project X Zone as a playable solo unit.

====== Other members ======
No.03 Gloria Durrell (グロリア・ダレル, Guroria Dareru)

An old woman who is a Madam of a brothel who got caught smuggling weapons and was sent to the Nameless.

No.06 Gusurg (グスルグ, Gusurugu)
Voiced by: Takuya Kirimoto

The original tank commander of the Nameless. Gusurg is a Darcsen who lost his name because he wanted to prove that Darcsen too can fight instead of doing nothing but suffer abuse and racism. After accepting Kurt as the squad leader, he makes use of his good relationship with the rest of the Nameless to help him earn their trust as well. However, he ends up deserting after refusing the Gallian Army's orders to use chemical weapons against his own people. He later reappears as a top member of Calamity Raven, confronting his former comrades on several occasions, until being ultimately killed in a final showdown with them at Randgriz.

No.11 Alfons Auclair (アルフォンス・オークレール, Arufonsu Ōkurēru)

Alfons was a former detective who was sent to the Nameless after illegally gaining personal information for a case. Known as the "Gallian Hawk" he prides himself on his abilities as a spy and informant.

No.12 Valerie Aynsley (ヴァレリー・エインズレイ, Varerī Einzurei)

Valerie was a historian who was sent to the Nameless after repeatedly trespassing on historical ruins in order to search for the truth behind the Darcsen Calamity

No.15 Amy Apple (エイミー・アップル, Eimī Appuru)
Voiced by: Minami Tsuda

An ordinary girl tricked into joining the Nameless in a desperate attempt to get enough money to fund her father's artistic career. Amy is a devout follower of Yggdism, a religion that worships the Valkyrians as gods.

No.16 Ada Ansorge

A police officer obsessed to put Cedric on death row, who, for refusing to cooperate with an officer who decided to send Cedric to the Nameless instead, is sent over to become, ironically, Cedric's squadmate.

No.17 Imari Gazotto

Imari was sent to Nameless because he didn't attend the compulsory Militia draft, having felt too lazy at that time.

No.18 Elliot Oates

A man in a fancy suit and gloves who was sent to the Nameless for alleged marriage fraud.

No.19 Frederika Lipps

A beautiful spy who went to the Nameless to escape from people chasing after her.

No.21 Felix Cowley (フェリクス・カウリ, Ferikusu Kauri)

Felix is a man with strong sense of justice who acts as a "big brother" towards his squadmates. He was sent to the Nameless because he filed a complaint against an incompetent officer.

No.23 Leila Peron (レイラ・ピエローニ, Reira Pierōni)

Homer's older sister. Leila is domineering and self-righteous woman who likes to call herself the "Queen of the Continent." A sadist by nature, Leila was inspired by the weak-willed personality of her brother and to make him a better man through whatever means necessary, including physical punishment. Not satisfied with just Homer, Leila made it her personal mission to "educate" each and every "worthless man" in Europa. Unfortunately it was this act they got her into the Nameless after she "educated" an officer.

No.24 Annika Alcott (アニカ・オルコット, Anika Orukotto)

An energetic girl who gets into a lot of fights, and ended up among the Nameless for beating a rogue senseless.

No.25 Cedric Drake

Known as "Crime King Cedric", he is a notorious criminal drafted into Squad 422 for repeated counts of theft and murder, among other things.

No.26 Gisele Fleming

A pyromaniac sent to the Nameless for repeated counts of arson.

No.32 Giulio Rosso (ジュリオ・ロッソ, Jurio Rosso)

A former chef banished to the Nameless for stealing rare food ingredients from a high-ranking officer.

No.33 Margit Ravelli

A Gallian army officer and Lanseal graduate who graduated with honors. Margit was sent to the Nameless because of a mission where her subordinates refuse to follow her orders to attack the enemy head-on.

No.45 Serge Liebert (セルジュ・リーベルト, Seruju Rīberuto)

Suffering form a fatal illness, Serge joins the Nameless, hopes to die gloriously in the battlefield rather than his bed.

No.46 Clarissa Callaghan (クラリッサ・キャラハン, Kurarissa Kyarahan)

Clarissa was formerly a nurse but was charged with treason and sent to the Nameless when she fell in love with a captured Imperial Soldier wounded in combat and help him escape back to his country.

No.56 Deit (ダイト, Daito)

An innocent man who sent to the Nameless only because he was a Darcsen.

No.57 Zahar Alonso (ザハール・アロンソ, Zahāru Aronso)

A former Fhirald general, Zahar became a mercenary when Fhirald lost to the Empire during the First Europan War. He ends up serving the Gallian Army during the invasion of Gallia but due to his heavy drinking problem which has causes too much trouble, he was sent to the Nameless.

No.58 Shin Hyuga (シン・ヒューガ, Shin Hyūga)

The son of a Gallian woman and a warrior from the East. Shin's conduct, dress, and manner of speech are similar to a Japanese Samurai. Using the customs of his father's homeland, Shin has sworn fealty to Gallia's "lord", Princess Cordelia only, believing that her orders are absolute, regardless if it means his own death. Because of this, he refuse to obey his Militia commanders which he sent to the Nameless for insubordination.

No. 66 Carisa Contzen (カリサ・コンツェン, Karisa Kontsen)
Voiced by: Ai Sasaki

A Gallian army officer who is in charge of Research and Development for the Nameless. She later becomes the squad's tank pilot. Looking younger than she is, Carisa refuses to reveal her true age, but rumors point that she is a veteran of the First Europan War.

====== Unplayable members ======
Ramsey Crowe (ラムゼイ・クロウ, Ramuzei Kurou)

Lieutenant Colonel Ramsey Crowe is Kurt's direct superior in the Nameless.

No.100 Antonio Jose Rodriguez

Calvaro Rodriguez's brother who serves as the Nameless drill instructor.

==== Empire ====
===== Calamity Raven =====
Calamity Raven are the main antagonists of Valkyria Chronicles III. They are a mysterious Imperial Military unit which most of its members composed of Darcsens. The goal of the Calamity was to hopefully create a sovereign nation for Dascen to live in by serving under the Imperial Army. Failing that, they become the feared Darscen nightmare that history has constantly treated them as rather than being forced to live in fear of persecution by recreating the Great Calamity they have been blamed for.
Dahau (ダハウ)
Voiced by: Kōichi Yamadera

Dahau is a Darcsen and the commander of Calamity Raven. Unlike most Darcens who had lived in fear, he led a resistance force against the Imperial forces despite being in a losing fight which would take the life of his wife. His skill and survival at the hands of the Imperial Forces had given him influence to be supported by Gennaro Borgia, a Yggdist Cardinal and serving under Maximilian.

Lydia Agute (リディア・アグーテ, Ridia Agūte)
Voiced by: Aya Hisakawa

Lydia is Dahau's aide and second-in-command. She is secretly keeping an eye on Dahau and to ensure he does not betray the Empire. As the last member of her of family she is cold and distant towards everyone in her unit, caring little but for the results.

Zig (ジグ, Jigu)
Voiced by: Miyu Irino

Zig is a young Darcsen teenager who is one of Dahau's staunchest supporters. He fights with a giant sword.

=== Valkyria Chronicles 4 ===
==== Squad E ====
Also known as "Easy Platoon" or "E-Z Platoon", the Edinburgh Army's Squad E is the main squad managed by the player in the game and the tip of the spear during Operation Northern Cross. Squad E is one of many smaller units tasked by the Federation with quickly driving North and invading the capital of the Empire during the early stages of EW2. Several of the units in Squad E come from Gallia as volunteers against the Empire, fearing that it could eventually invade their home country, which actually happens during the course of the game.

Claude Wallace (クロード・ウォレス, Kurōdo Uoresu)
Voiced by (English): Max Mittelman
Voiced by (Japanese): Ryōsuke Kanemoto
The Gallian commanding officer of Squad E, First Lieutenant in the Army and member of the 32nd Armored Ranger Corps. Initially seen as a coward by most of his friends and allies, Claude slowly works to earn their trust during Ranger training. Claude usually commands the squad from his custom battle tank, the Hafen, but also functions as a skilled Scout outside of the tank.
Riley Miller (レイリィ・ミラー, Reiryi Mirā)
Voiced by (English): Kayli Mills
Voiced by (Japanese): Nao Tōyama
Born in Gallia, Riley spent 10 years abroad in the United States of Vinland before coming to the UKE to fight with Squad E. Riley is a Science Officer and Artillery Advisor for the Edinburgh Army who helps design weapons and other tech for the squad. She initially has a tense relationship with Claude, blaming him for his supposed cowardice over a decade ago, and she retains a streak of pyrophobia, both from a fire set by suspected Imperial agents that took the lives of her family. In-game, Riley functions as the Squad's first Grenadier, able to launch mortar shells in a wide radius.
Raz (ラズ, Razu)
Voiced by (English): Greg Chun
Voiced by (Japanese): Kazuya Nakai
Gallia-born, Darcsen Sergeant of Squad E and a childhood rival of Claude who completed the same Ranger training as him. A brash, hotheaded Shocktrooper who often has arguments with Claude and other senior members of the squad that sometimes turn physical.
Kai Schulen (カイ・シュレン, Kai Shuren)
Voiced by (English): Erica Mendez
Voiced by (Japanese): Maaya Sakamoto
Gallian Sergeant in Squad E, Ranger, and prodigal Sniper known as "Deadeye Kai." Kai is incredibly mature and mild-mannered, willing to defer to his superiors even if he doesn't fully agree with them. However, the current identity of "Kai" is held by his sister, Leena, after the real Kai left the squad.
Minerva Victor (ミネルバ・ウィクトル, Mineruba Wikutoru)
Voiced by (English): Alexis Tipton
Voiced by (Japanese): Saori Hayami
Originally the commanding officer of Squad F, she graduated from the same Ranger class as Claude and hates him for succeeding his apparent carefree attitude, compared to her more focused, professional demeanor. After almost all members of her squad are killed in an ambush, she joins Squad E. Minerva functions as a Scout in game.

==== X-0 ====
The main antagonists of Valkyria Chronicles 4, "X-0" is the Empire's experimental weapons squad created by Heinrich Belgar.

Heinrich Belgar (ベルガー, Hainrihhi Berugā)
Voiced by: Shō Hayami
The game's main antagonist, Heinrich Belgar is the Head of the Imperial Science Board, and commander of X-0, with the intention of stopping Operation Cygnus and seize the Federation ships for the sake of his research.
Forseti (フォルセ, Foruse)
Voiced by (English): Lucien Dodge
Voiced by (Japanese): Kaito Ishikawa
Imperial Science Board's chief of operations, Forseti was originally the real Kai Schulen and Leena's older brother, who defected from the Federation after witnessing the cruelty of their Valkyria experiments.
Klaus Walz (クラウツ・ヴォルツ, Kurautsu Vorutsu)
Voiced by (English): Ray Chase
Voiced by (Japanese): Hiroki Touchi
Lieutenant Colonel in the Imperial Army and the leader of the 502nd Heavy Tank Platoon, "Ausbruch." Klaus rides his custom tank, the Vulcan, into battle and sees the Hafen's commander as his best rival after being defeated by him in their initial encounter. Secretly the illegitimate son of noble family in the Empire, he often disobeys orders to settle personal scores. He is later scouted by Belgar to join X-0.
Crymaria Levin (クライマリア・レヴィン, Kuraimaria Revin)
Voiced by (English): Veronica Taylor
Voiced by (Japanese): Yukana
The Special Duty Captain of X-0. A Valkyria known as the "Winter Witch" for the snowstorms that follow in her wake. It is said that she has the strongest power among all Valkyria, albeit unstable.

== Valkyria Revolution ==
=== Jutland ===
==== Five Traitors ====
Ten years before the start of the war, five orphans in Molda returned to find their orphanage burned down and their caretaker, Maria, kidnapped by the Ruzi Emperor and his four Grand Generals. Those five orphans would later gain the strength and knowledge needed to get revenge on Ruz, and either rescue Maria or avenge her death. Though their actions did eventually succeed in liberating Jutland from the tyranny of Ruz, their motives for doing so would eventually lead to their deaths and infamy as The Five Traitors.

Amleth Grønkjær (アムレート・グレンケア, Amurēto Gurenkea)
Voiced by (English): Greg Chun
Voiced by (Japanese): Daisuke Ono
The ringleader of the Five Traitors and the main character of Valkyria Revolution. His initial attempt to assassinate the Ruzi Emperor Klaudiusz failed when a mysterious Reaper appeared and almost killed him, but spared his life for reasons unknown. Knowing that Klaudiusz would not be so easy to kill with such a powerful guard watching him, Amleth worked his way up the ranks in the Jutland Army and became Captain of the anti-Valkyria squad Vanargand. Known to be a picky eater. Amleth functions as a Shocktrooper unit in game.
Basil Sabancci (バジル・サバンジュ, Bajiru Sabanju)
Voiced by: Yūki Kaji
Adopted son of an industrialist who inherited his company, Sabancci and Co. Basil runs his company with a focus on ragnite and mana-based weapons research and development. He provides Vanargand with their armaments and technology to fight the war and stand up to the Valkyria. He also donates money and supplies to local orphanages both to improve his image and in support of Jutland.
Solomon Kahlenberg (スレイマン・カーレンベルグ, Sureiman Kārenberugu)
Voiced by: Hiroshi Kamiya
A member of Jutland's parliament who pushed the country's leadership towards war while quietly making deals with other nations to weaken Ruz's grip on Europa. He helps provide legal cover for the Traitors while fending off a stridently anti-war rival in the legislature.
Fritte Eriksen (フリート・エリクセン, Furīto Erikusen)
Voiced by: Takahiro Sakurai
A highly skilled writer and researcher who regularly publishes columns for the local paper. He works to sway public opinion in support of the war while providing his co-conspirators with information about the public's mood.
Violette Szand (バイオレット・サンド, Baioretto Sando)
Voiced by: Miyuki Sawashiro
A master spy who has built up a network of informants across Europa, and is intimate with several officers in the Ruzi military. She uses her network to feed information to both the Jutland army and the Traitors. Despite being called a "femme fatale", she has never killed any of the people she gathered information from.

==== Vanargand ====
The "Anti-Valkyria Unit" created by Amleth within the Jutish Army, chosen specifically for their high aptitude with Ragnite and alchemy in order to form a squad that could stand a chance in fighting against the Valkyria guarding the Ruzi Emperor. Vanargand is oftentimes called upon to assist the army with non-Valkyria battles as well, in order to secure their liberation from Ruz.

Ophelia Augusta af Jutland (オフィーリア・アウグスタ・ア・ユトランド, Ofīria Augusuta A Yutorando)
Voiced by: Saori Hayami
Princess of Jutland who decided to fight with Vanargand on the front lines to liberate her country. Throughout her military training, she constantly begged her teachers and superiors to treat her just as any other cadet, but everyone except Amleth was too intimidated by her royal status to oblige. She later discovered that her song ("Galdr") had the power to negate the Valkyria's magical dirge. In the game, along with the ability to use Scout-class alchemy, she can also equip and use unique Galdr alchemy that no other unit can use.
Godot Vilfort (ゴドー・ヴィルフォルト, Godō Viruforuto)
Voiced by: Toshiyuki Morikawa
Older brother of Miranda, Ophelia's knight and the Executive Officer of Vanargand. His sense of patriotism for Jutland is so strong it has even ruined casual relationships for him, though he is unconcerned with those. After seeing Amleth kill one of the Grand Generals in cold blood, he works to uncover the identities of the Five Traitors, but decides that their goals are aligned with those of Jutland and remains silent. Godot later sacrifices himself to save Amleth from being killed by the Valkyria. Godot functions as a Shield unit in game, and also acts as the squad's XO at their headquarters when the player wishes to begin a mission or exchange ragnite shards for alchemy.
Blum Tomasson (ブルム・トマソン, Burumu Tomason)
Voiced by: Nobunaga Shimazaki
The son of a tailor in Elsinore, a timid boy who was pushed into joining the army by Helena, had enough aptitude with Ragnite that he was placed in Vanargand. Though usually meek and timid, Blum is capable of scaring everyone nearby if he hears anyone insult Helena. Blum functions as a Sapper unit in game, and his family's shop can be used to craft new gear for Vanargand in-between missions.
Helena Andersen (ヘレナ・アンデルセン, Herena Anderusen)
Voiced by: Yukiyo Fujii
A competitive and confident girl who seeks to prove her strength to the world. She worked as a server in a local cafe in Elsinore, run by her family, before enlisting with Blum. Helena functions as a Shocktrooper unit in game.
Brigitte Ulrik (ブリギッタ・ウルリッヒ, Burigitta Ururihhi)
Voiced by: Yu Shimamura
A former teacher with a cold demeanor who constantly corrects and nags at under-performing members of her squad. Her attitude changes drastically with a gun in her hands. Brigitte functions as a Scout unit in game.
Jordur Kvist (ジョルダー・クヴィスト, Jorudā Kuvisuto)
Voiced by: Kazuya Nakai
A single father from a rural part of Jutland who joined the army years ago to protect his family. Friends with Daryl. Jordur functions as a Shield unit in game.
Isaak Berggreen (イザーク・ベアグリーン, Izāku Beagurīn)
Voiced by (English): Sean Chiplock
Voiced by (Japanese): Hiroki Takahashi
The scion of a Jutish noble family who joined Vanargand to uphold his family's reputation and make a name for himself. Isaak spends most of his time courting ladies and trying to one-up Amleth on the squad, often with no positive results. However, his acts of spying on Amleth to look for a weakness have turned him into a skilled Scout for Vanargand.
Daryl Rommedahl (ダリル・ロンメダール, Dariru Ronmedāru)
Voiced by: Unshô Ishizuka
A career soldier and former Drill Sergeant mostly known for getting drunk, to the point where his squadmates in Vanargand are unsure which of his old war stories are true and which are just exaggeration. Sometimes goes out drinking with Jordur, his former student. Daryl functions as a Shocktrooper unit in game.
Sara Benner (サラ・ベナー, Sara Benā)
Voiced by: Minami Tsuda
A friendly fashion designer who tries to designs weapons and clothing that are both good-looking and practical, despite wearing the least clothing of anyone in the squad. She became good friends with Ophelia as she was the only one to not be deferential to or intimidated by her status as Jutish royalty, often referring to her as "Fifi." Later revealed to be a foreign war orphan who was raised by an old Jutish artist when Miranda suspected her of espionage. Her aptitude with Ragnite-embedded materials led her to become a Sapper in the squad.
Tilda Gade (ティルダ・ゲーゼ, Tiruda Gēze)
Voiced by: Yuka Komatsu
A former weapons engineer and slovenly member of Vanargand who often finds ways to slack off or push her chores onto her squadmates, especially Brigitte, in the name of "efficiency." However, she cares for her teammates in her own way, and will defend them with her life on the battlefield, leading her to become a Shield unit.
Miranda Vilfort (ミランダ・ヴィルフォルト, Miranda Viruforuto)
Voiced by: Ayumi Fujimura
Ophelia's childhood friend and Lady-in-waiting, and younger sister of Godot who is also a member of Ophelia's royal guard. She wished to join Vanargand but Ophelia insisted that she stay in Jutland to defend their home. However, upon Godot's death, she took up his sword and shield and joined Vanargand, taking over her late brother's duties as XO. Once she stumbled over Godot's journal detailing the identities of the Five Traitors, she revealed her findings to Ophelia. In-game, Miranda has the same abilities and melee weapon as Godot, replacing him on the roster once he dies in the story. Any progress made in upgrading Godot's stats or alchemic affinities will roll over to Miranda upon her acceptance into Vanargand.

=== Ruzhien Empire ===
Klaudiusz Powlovich Kiev (クローディアス・パウロヴィッチ・キエフ, Kurōdiasu Paurovicchi Kiefu)
Voiced by: Tsutomu Isobe
The Emperor of Ruzhien who transformed a small country into the largest nation in all of Europa. He maintains an iron grip on his Empire and managed to bond a Valkyria to his service. However, he also shows a willingness to be pragmatic when it benefits him, including the induction of Maxim into his inner circle despite being a relative foreigner.
Brunhilde (ブリュンヒルデ, Buryunhirude)
Voiced by: Maaya Sakamoto
The Valkyria who has possessed Maria as her earth-bound vessel. Sings a magical dirge that can kill anyone who hears it for long enough. In the game, Brunhilde appears as a Reaper equipped with a large scythe and powerful magic. She can even appear in certain side missions if the player takes too long to clear them before night falls on the battlefield.

==== Grand Generals ====
Gilouche Benckendorff (ギルーシュ・ベンケンドルフ, Girushu Bekendorufu)
Voiced by: Tessho Genda
Head of the Ruz Army, Minister of War and the leader of the Grand Generals. The foster-brother of Klaudiusz whose charisma and lively demeanor inspires his men to fight for Ruz. He pilots a humanoid Guardian mech.
Viktor Timashev (ヴィクトール・チマシェフ, Vikutōru Chimashefu)
Voiced by: Atsuki Tani
Number two officer of the Ruz Army and Minister of Home Affairs. A master strategist and cold-hearted man who only respects Klaudiusz, and sees everyone else as a pawn to be sacrificed when necessary. Viktor was a prime driver behind the country's rapid expansion into the Empire it is today. He pilots a Snake mech.
Gustav Mecklenburg (グスタフ・メクレンブルク, Gusutafu Mekurenburuku)
Voiced by (English): Lucien Dodge
Voiced by (Japanese): Toshihiko Seki
Minister of the Ruz Navy. A mostly laid-back member of the Grand Generals who treats war as a game, constantly luring Amleth and his unit into traps and attempts to crush them with large numbers of tanks. He pilots a Whale mech.
Balthus Greppenberg (バルデュス・グリッペンベルク, Barudyusu Gurippenberuku)
Voiced by: Kenji Nojima
The most hot-blooded of the Grand Generals who pilots a Dragon mech. He is killed early in the game after Vanargand assaults the Ruzi base in Molda, when he is executed by Amleth after attempting to flee.
Maxim Laertes (マクシム, Makushimu)
Voiced by: Kenichi Suzumura
The exiled Prince of Ipseria who was pressed into service in the Ruzhien military and experimented on when he was younger, having his right arm replaced with a mana-enhanced prosthetic. After Balthus dies, Klaudiusz decides to have Maxim fill the vacant spot among his Grand Generals. Ophelia repeatedly tries to persuade him to join Jutland's cause, but he refuses, having aligned himself with the Empire. In the game, Maxim appears as a minor boss character in multiple story missions, attacking Amleth and his party with quick strikes and alchemic attacks. Maxim becomes a playable character in the separate DLC pack "Maxim and Remembrance."
