= List of Drakengard and Nier characters =

Drakengard series
- Artwork by regular series artist Kimihiko Fujisaka, featuring Caim and Angelus (Drakengard), Nowe and Legna (Drakengard 2) Zero and Mikhail (Drakengard 3), and Nier and Grimoire Weiss (Nier). According to Fujisaka, creating the passive poses for the dragons was difficult for him.
- First appearance: Drakengard (2003)
- Last appearance: Nier Reincarnation (2021)

Drakengard (Note: Known in Japan as Drag-On Dragoon (ドラッグ オン ドラグーン, Doraggu on doragūn; commonly abbreviated as DOD)) is an action role-playing game released on PlayStation 2 (PS2) in 2003 in Japan and 2004 in the West. The first entry in a series of the same name, it spawned two follow-up titles; a direct sequel Drakengard 2 (2005), and a prequel Drakengard 3 (2013). A subseries spun-off from one of the original game's endings began in 2010 with the release of Nier, which was followed by Nier: Automata (2016) and Nier Reincarnation (2021). Both the Drakengard and Nier series have been supported by expanded media.

The universe of Drakengard is split into multiple timelines, with some of the events detailed in either games or supplementary material leading into different entries in the series. The main setting used by the Drakengard games is Midgard, a dark fantasy version of Medieval Europe drawing inspiration from the folklore of Northern Europe. A key aspect of the Drakengard universe is the "pact", (Note: Contract (契約, Keiyaku) in the original Japanese) a ritual that links souls and grants a human great power in return for some aspect of themselves (such as their voice, charm, aging ability) while the beast partner feeds on their negative emotions. The Nier titles take place in a reality stemming from the fifth ending of Drakengard, although the connection is minimal.

The original game's characters were created by director Taro Yoko, and producers Takamasa Shiba and Takuya Iwasaki. Other contributors over the years include series writer Sawako Natori, and supplementary writer Emi Nagashima. The first game's characters were created as a deliberate contrast with the casts of other popular role-playing games of the time. For Drakengard 2, director Akira Yasui insisted on a tonal shift, influencing both the story and character designs. For Drakengard 3, the majority of the main characters were female and inspired by multiple sources including contemporary anime. Character designs for Drakengard were done by Kimihiko Fujisaka and Taro Hasegawa. The characters original Nier's characters were designed by Korean artist D.K, with the game notably using different versions of the main protagonist for Japan and overseas releases. Later Nier titles saw contributions from several artists including Akihiko Yoshida.

Reviewers have been mostly positive about the games' characters: the first game's cast received favorably, and many praised their dialogue. Opinions were more mixed about the characters of Drakengard 2, which certain reviewers claimed were weaker than those of the previous game. Drakengard 3 was criticized for uneven writing, but it received praise for its unusual characters and their interactions. Nier's cast and the relationship between its story and characters were lauded. The characters of Drakengard and Nier have gained a strong following in Japan.

== Concept and development ==
=== Drakengard ===
The core concepts of the Drakengard series, along with many of their narrative elements, were created by series director Taro Yoko, who also contributed to the games' scenarios. Other contributors across the series' lifetime include producers Takamasa Shiba and Takuya Iwasaki. The main writer for the first five games was Sawako Natori, while Emi Nagashima was involved in writing supplementary material under Yoko's supervision. The main theme of the Drakengard series is immorality, which is shown through the characters' dialogue. Other themes included war and death (Drakengard 2), showing conflicting yet valid views in the aftermath of a terrible event (Drakengard 3, Nier), and struggling out of a bad situation (Nier: Automata). Multiple aspects of the original game's story were dark, sad and serious in tone, contrasting with the likes of Dragon Quest and Final Fantasy. A recurring aesthetic element across all the games is the representation of magic using the Celestial Alphabet, with the most common letter arrangement representing the human gene. The concept of multiple endings, a theme extended across the Drakengard multiverse, was originally included as Yoko was told Drakengard would be a one-off game project.

For the first game, Yoko took charge of creating Seere, Leonard and Arioch, while Iwasaki was involved in developing Verdelet, Inuart and Caim. An anime series which influenced the first game was Neon Genesis Evangelion, with a comparison being drawn between them due to a shared trait: while having standard premises, darker narrative elements were hidden in its content. Another anime which influenced aspects of the game was Sister Princess. Caim, the main protagonist, was meant to be an examination of the typical action game hero, which Yoko felt should not have a happy ending in a story focused on violence. The nature of Caim and Angelus' relationship underwent changes during development: Yoko had conceived their relationship as a parasitic one, but Iwasaki wanted to create a different type of romance, and so wrote the love story for the two of them. Inuart was originally designed as the main protagonist of Drakengard, with him being a "useless hero". A pivotal scene in the game, where he first clashes with Caim, became one of the ways Yoko was able to properly project his vision of the game's world.

Furiae was designed by Yoko as both an explanation for Caim and Inuart's rivalry, and as a representation of his distaste for the kind of forgettable character she represented. The relationship between Caim and Furiae, as well as their ultimate fates, was Yoko's response to the standard happy ending found in most role-playing games at the time, which he felt did not fit in with a protagonist who had killed hundreds during their quest. Caim and Furiae were respectively based around Guts from Berserk and Rei Ayanami from Neon Genesis Evangelion, with Caim being codenamed "Guts" during development. Verdelet was portrayed as the "despicable elder", who cared for no-one except himself: his personality was intended to be both ineffectual and bossy, even in the face of catastrophe. Manah's role in Drakengard was designed to represent unloved children. Natori admitted to being embarrassed by her dialogue for Manah and her brother Seere when she heard it performed during voice recording.

Drakengard was artist Kimihiko Fujisaka's his first job as a character designer: his designs were firmly seated within the Medieval European aesthetic. To achieve this, he imagined that he had been sent back to that historical period. His designs were inspired by the character designs of Final Fantasy and Dragon Quest. Caim was one of the earliest characters created for Drakengard. In Inuart's design, Fujisaka incorporated heavy armor into his design to give a more forceful impression for players. His ultimate role and final design were based around the idea of him being Caim's rival. Legna's design did not impress Shiba, who considered cutting him from the final product. Manah's red clothing was designed to evoke both its status as the game's key color, and her status as the leader of the Cult of the Watchers Shiba approved of the design, feeling that it contrasted nicely with Furiae's predominantly white design. Fujisaka also helped design Furiae's monster form for the game's second ending. In hindsight, Fujisaka was dissatisfied with his work on Drakengard, particularly his work on Caim. Monster designs were done by Taro Hasegawa.

Drakengard 2 was designed to keep some of the dark aesthetics of the original, but at the same time tone down or remove others to increase the series' appeal to mainstream gamers. One of the main people behind this was director Akira Yasui, who ended up having creative clashes with Yoko over the matter. One of the main concepts for main protagonist Nowe was surpassing one's father. For the fight between Nowe and Legna, special gameplay functions and mechanics needed to be created for Nowe. Shiba had mixed feelings about the final fight between Legna and Nowe, which he saw as a drastic change from both the first game and the series mechanic of the protagonist riding a dragon. Shiba ended up writing their dialogue to emphasize their relationship and the difficulty of them fighting each other, paralleling earlier scenes between Caim and Angelus. The deaths of Caim and Angelus was intended to be "short and ruthless", but Yasui had it changed to the more sentimental version present in the game. Dialogue from Caim for the scene was cut from the game due to it clashing with his previous portrayal as a mute. Urick was created to be the supportive "big brother" of the party.

For Drakengard 2, Yasui wanted to make the game the "opposite" to Drakengard, which partly involved the game having a broader color palette. While Fujisaka designed the main characters for Drakengard 2, the dragon Legna was designed by Taro Hasegawa returned to design both Legna and the second game's monsters. Nowe, in contrast to the other protagonists of the Drakengard series, was designed around the concept of a stereotypical hero. Nowe was one of Fujisaka's favorite characters to design, although Shiba was less enthusiastic. Manah's redesign in Drakengard 2 reflected both her evolved personality and her more traditional depiction as a fantasy heroine. Elements of their designs were taken from Caim and Furiae, representing "passing the torch" between characters. Because of Legna's different roles in Drakengard and Drakengard 2, his design and movements were altered for his second incarnation. Eris's design was inspired by Casca, a character from Berserk: while he tried not to copy any parts of Casca's design, Fujisaka tried to convey it using aspects of her personality. He also tried to balance this part of her depiction with a tender and more feminine side. Another idea he had in mind was the image of an honors student. Her dance-like fighting style was generally suggested by the game's staff. Urick was created to be the supportive "big brother" of the party. An interesting piece of the design for Fujisaka was the character's exposed navel. It was Shiba's idea for the character to wear a mask. In hindsight, both Shiba and Fujisaka felt that the mask was unnecessary. The symbol for his pact partner was incorporated into his weapon. Caim's redesign was meant to represent his status as a wanderer.

For Drakengard 3, a prequel to the first two games, the developers wanted to create a balance between the previous games' dark atmosphere and stories, and additional moments of humor to help lighten the atmosphere. In contrast to the previous games, the team made Drakengard 3's protagonist a woman, with many of her design aspects meant to evoke the dark atmosphere. Ideas to make the setting a modern one and the protagonist a contemporary schoolgirl were rejected at an early stage. Yoko, Natori and Nagashima were jointly responsible for creating the disciples' personalities. Yoko wanted Nagashima to write Cent to be as much of an idiot as possible, while she received some negative feedback for her portrayal of Decadus despite her best efforts. Octa was the character Natori and Nagashima best understood, though Nagashima found it difficult writing his novella. While writing Mikhail's dialogue, Natori was asked by Yoko to embody the good qualities of animals and children in him. Instead of being realistic, Natori borrowed elements from other fiction to create his personality, finding him the most fun to write. The dialogue between Zero and her disciples was written by Yoko to contrast in content with the violent combat.

Fujisaka's design for Zero was the first one for the game and the first to be approved by Yoko. The other Intoners were designed fairly quickly after that: Yoko told Fujisaka to "think Puella Magi Madoka Magica" when designing them. Each character had different design themes: for example, Five's was nudity and knitwear, Four's was her being a female captain, and Two's were underwear and "lolita". Three was meant to have bangs covering her face and multiple hairpins, but this was dropped. The characters' number-based names and differing eye colors were meant to help players identify them, while aspects of Zero's design were incorporated into the other Intoners to emphasize their connections. The Apostles were designed and approved quickly as they were not a high priority. They were designed around prime male archetypes: Cent, originally the group's sadist, was the "pretty boy", Octa was the "old man", Decadus was the "middle-aged man", and Dito was the "little boy". Prior to Drakengard 3, his artwork for the series dragons had been of them in flight or in action: when he needed to create tenth anniversary artwork featuring the main protagonists of all the Drakengard games to that point, he was faced with the difficult task of drawing the three main dragon characters in passive poses.

=== Nier ===
For Nier, Yoko said that he shifted away from the darker themes of Drakengard, instead focusing on friendship and the combination of effort to overcome obstacles. The term "Replicant", one of the key story elements, was coined by Yoko from the 1982 science fiction movie Blade Runner. As to the title "Nier" Yoko did not cite a particular source, passing it off as a codename that persisted through development. Yonah's original Japanese name was derived from the Biblical name Jonah: this could not be take verbatim into its localized form due to the name being associated with a man, so the name was changed to "Yonah". Much of the game was inspired by the September 11 attacks and the war on terror. Yoko took from it the idea of a terrible event where both sides believed they were doing the right thing, and wanted to show the player multiple perspectives of the same events.

Two different versions of the main protagonist Nier were created: one was a young man, while the other was an older father. This was suggested by western staff, and while initially uncomfortable, it offered Yoko the chance to explore two different relationship dynamics using the same characters. While nothing major changed between the two versions, lines of dialogue were altered so that the character portrayals did not clash. Kainé's character was made intersexual, since the team felt it fitted in with many other aspects of her gritty backstory. Kainé's status as an intersexual caused some commotion in western territories, which is something the team did not actively intend. Yoko attributed the original suggestion to female staff members working on the game. Yonah's in-game diary was written by female in-house staff.

The character designs for Nier were done by Korean artist known under the moniker D.K. The main character of Nier received two different designs: the original one was a teenage boy, while the other was an adult: the former was cast as Yonah's brother, and the latter her father. The older protagonist was designed later, after Yoko visited the publisher's American studios in Los Angeles. Many characters underwent changes during development, and some needed to be cut: there were originally thirteen Grimoires, with all but three being cut: those that remained were Weiss, Noir and Rubrum. Emil's character was derived from a female character named Halua, while Kainé was originally a far more feminine type who hid her violent nature. For Nier: Automata, main character designs were by Akihiko Yoshida, whose most notable work has been on the Final Fantasy series. Yoshida was brought on board the project based on player feedback about the character designs of Nier. Initially, the production team thought he would refuse due to his busy schedule, but many staff members at his company CyDesignation were fans of the original game. Yoshida joined the production team later than usual. Due to this, Yoshida needed a general guideline about his designs: Yoko said to use sleek designs and use black as the dominant color. Other characters were designs by Yuya Nagai and Toshiyuki Itahana. Yoshida returned to create designs for Nier Reincarnation (2021) and a remaster of Nier.

== Drakengard universe ==
=== Recurring ===
- Caim (カイム, Kaimu) – The main protagonist of Drakengard and an antagonist in Drakengard 2. After seeing the death of his parents and the destruction of his home by the Imperial dragon Legna, Caim swore vengeance against the Empire and fostered a deep hatred of dragons. After being mortally wounded in a battle, he is forced to make a Pact with Angelus to save himself, for which the price is his voice. In Drakengard 2, Caim is on a quest to free Angelus from the painful burden of the Seals. He also lost his eye, becoming known through the lands as the "One-Eyed Man". He succeeds, but Angelus has been driven insane by the burden and must be killed, killing him too. Caim is voiced by Shinnosuke Ikehata.
- Angelus (Note: Angel (アンヘル, Anheru)) – A red dragon. Possessing pride to the point of arrogance, she is close to death from torture when Caim finds her. The two make a pact to save both their lives, and while it is initially a means of staying alive, Angelus and Caim gradually form a genuine bond. In Drakengard 2, having become the Goddess Seal, Angelus is driven mad by the painful burden placed on her, which eventually forces her to be killed. Angelus is voiced by Shinnosuke Ikehata in Japanese.
- Legna (レグナ, Reguna) – One of the antagonists of Drakengard, and a protagonist in Drakengard 2. In his original appearance, he is known simply as the "Black Dragon" and is shackled to the Empire, becoming Inuart's pact partner. He is also the dragon who killed Caim's parents. In Drakengard 2, Legna acts as a surrogate father to Nowe, being supportive of him despite following his own goals. In Drakengard 2, Legna is voiced by Yoshio Harada in Japanese.
- The Watchers (Note: Angels (天使, Tenshi) in Japanese and the English version of Drakengard 3, also referred to as "Grotesqueries" (Drakengard) and "Daemons" (Drakengard 3).) are recurring beings in the Drakengard universe, serving the world's ruling Gods (Note: The Gods: referred to as a single eponymous God (神, Kami) in the Japanese version, and the "Nameless" in Drakengard 2) and acting as one of the primary antagonists. Due to humanity's uncontrollable ego, the Gods wish to destroy them, using the Watchers and dragons as their agents. In Drakengard 2, the Gods and the Watchers become engaged in a war with the dragons, who wish to overthrow them and claim their power.
- Manah (マナ, Mana) – The main antagonist of Drakengard and the main female protagonist of Drakengard 2. Having been abused by her mother all her life, Manah longed for love to the point where she lost her mind. She is influenced by the Watchers to act as their agent in the world's destruction as the religious center of the Cult of Watchers. (Note: Church of Angels (天使の教会, Tenshi no kyōkai) in the Japanese version) In Drakengard 2, she has lost her memories of her childhood, and now acts to free the people from their oppression, forming a bond with Nowe in the process. As a child, Manah is voiced by Sherry Lynn in English and Natsuki Yamashita in Japanese. As an adult, she is voiced by Koyuki in Japanese.
- Seere (セエレ) – An optional character. Manah's brother, he was never subjected to the abuse his sister suffered, which caused him to suffer from intense guilt. He made a pact with a Golem to save his life: the price was his "time", leaving him trapped in a child's unaging body. In Drakengard 2, Seere leads the so-called "Knights of the Seal" due to having prophetic powers, although his power is severely limited. Seere is voiced by Sota Murakami in Japanese.

=== Drakengard ===
- Furiae (フリアエ) – Caim's sister and the chosen Goddess of the Seal, Furiae is revered by the Union, yet curses her fate as she must live in near-complete isolation. Her suppressed incestuous love for Caim causes her further torment, including driving Caim and Inuart apart. Furiae is voiced by Kari Wahlgren in English and by Eriko Hatsune in Japanese.
- Inuart (イウヴァルト, Iuvaruto) – Furiae's former fiancé and Caim's friend. While outwardly brave, Inuart harbors a deep inferiority complex rooted in envy of Caim's prowess, and is exasperated when Furiae is chosen as the new Goddess of the Seal. After being captured by the Empire, Manah exploits this for her own ends and convinces him to form a pact with Legna, which costs him his singing voice, so he can protect Furiae. Inuart is voiced by Toshiaki Karasawa in Japanese.
- Verdelet (ヴェルドレ, Verudore) – The Hierarch of the Union and the person in charge of protecting the Goddess, being the only human who can directly speak with her. While outwardly virtuous and dedicated, he quickly becomes self-serving and cowardly when he or his power are in danger. Like many of the other characters, he formed a pact with a now-petrified dragon at the cost of his hair. In Drakengard 2, it is revealed that after Verdelet put added pressure on Angelus' Seal bindings, Caim killed him. Verdelet is voiced by Iemasa Kayumi in Japanese.
- Leonard (レオナール, Reonāru) – An optional character. Initially presented as a kindly hermit whose brothers were killed by Imperial troops, Leonard is in fact a paedophile who isolated himself to contain his urges, which indirectly led to his brothers' deaths. While still unstable after a suicide attempt, a faerie forces a pact on him with his eyesight as payment. Leonard is voiced by Koichi Yamadera in Japanese.
- Arioch (アリオーシュ, Ariōshu) – An optional character. Originally a caring mother, she went insane after her family and village were wiped out by Imperial forces. Her madness takes the form of cannibalism of dead children, believing that they would be "safe" inside her. On the brink of death while in Imperial captivity, the spirits Undine and Salamander formed a pact with her at the cost of her uterus. Arioch is voiced by Megumi Hayashibara in Japanese.

=== Drakengard 2 ===
- Nowe (ノウェ) – The main protagonist of Drakengard 2. Nowe was born from the magical fusion of Inuart with Furiae's corpse. Due to the circumstances of his birth, Nowe is infused with dragon powers and becomes a hybrid known as a "New Breed", which Legna intended to use for his own ends. After learning of the Knights' methods for sustaining the world, he rebels against them and joins Manah's cause. Nowe is voiced by James Daniel Wilson in English and Ryo Katsuji in Japanese.
- Eris (エリス, Erisu) – One of the female protagonists. A childhood friend of Nowe, she is a dedicated Knight and initially thinks Nowe has been brainwashed by Manah after his betrayal. She is one of the few high-ranking Knights not to be in a pact. Eris is voiced by Saki Aibu in Japanese.
- Urick (ユーリック, Yūrikku) – A former District General, and one of the playable cast. Originally a close friend to General Oror and Yaha's implied lover, Urick fled in fear when Caim launched his first attacks, burdening him with guilt due to his actions. He is in a pact with a Grim Reaper spirit, which cost him his mortality. Urick ends up being killed by Caim while protecting Nowe, dying content that he atoned for his failure. Urick is voiced by Rikiya Koyama in Japanese.
- Gismor (ジスモア, Jisumoa) – The main antagonist of Drakengard 2. Having suffered the life of a near-slave after the fall of the Empire, Gismor has become embittered and obsessed with power. Like the Lieutenants, Gismor is in a pact, but it is unknown with what or what the price was. Gismor is voiced by Tachiki Fumihiko in Japanese.
- Zhangpo (ザンポ, Zanpo), Hanch (ハンチ, Hanchi) and Yaha (ヤハ) – The three remaining Lieutenants and District Guardians, who act as secondary antagonists. Each made a pact with a beast and gained power because of it: Zhangpo paid his pact with an Ifrit with his stomach, Hanch paid her pact with a Kelpie with her charm, and Yaha paid his pact with the Gnomes with his ability to feel pleasure. Yaha is also implied to have been Urick's lover. The three are respectively voiced by Gashuin Tatsuya, Kojima Sachiko and Rolly Teranishi in Japanese.
- Oror (オロー, Orō) – A mostly unseen character in Drakengard 2. Having found Legna and Nowe, Oror acted as Nowe's father alongside Legna. His ideals clashed with Gismor's ambitions, and so Gismor poisoned him; in the event, Oror was actually killed by Caim. Despite this, his spirit lingered and appears before Nowe during his journey. Oror is voiced by Takaya Hashi in Japanese.

=== Drakengard 3 ===
- Intoners (Note: Utahime (歌姫; lit. "Songstresses")) - A group of women who wield magic through song. The Intoners were created by a magical flower as instruments of humanity's destruction. While there was originally only one Intoner, five more were spawned who eventually gained sentience: these five worked to bring peace to the war-torn world, but all the while the flower continued to use them as agents for humanity's destruction. All the "sister" Intoners have a high sex drive, and some aspect of themselves that grows progressively with consequent inconvenient effects on their bodies or surroundings.
  - Zero (ゼロ) – The main protagonist of Drakengard 3. Zero was originally a normal woman who was chosen by the flower to be an Intoner. After her suicide attempt causes the birth of the other Intoners, she sets out to kill her "sisters". Zero is voiced by Tara Platt in English and Maaya Uchida in Japanese.
  - One (ワン, Wan) – The leader of the five sisters, and the most powerful. The leader of the Intoners, the second-oldest "sister", and the second most powerful next to Zero. Ruling from the Cathedral City, she holds a strong sense of justice while also acknowledging her ultimate fate to become the world's enemy. Her five senses grow more sensitive as time passes. One is voiced by Lauren Landa in English and Rie Tanaka in Japanese.
  - Two (トウ, Tō) – Ruler of the Land of Sand. The most cheerful and sociable of the group, she has a deep love of children, taking in orphans of war. She is also deeply in love with her disciple. However, when her power accidentally transforms her children into a monster, her mind is broken. She possesses great physical strength, which grows to dangerous levels as she gets older. Two is voiced by Chiwa Saitō in Japanese and Kate Higgins in English.
  - Three (スリイ, Surii) – Ruler of the Land of Forests. A sociopath with an obsession with dolls and prone to extreme laziness, she engages in extremely cruel experiments on her soldiers. Her hair grows at a fast rate, forcing her to carry scissors with her at all times. Three is voiced by Mamiko Noto in Japanese and Mela Lee in English.
  - Four (フォウ, Fō) – Ruler of the Land of Mountains. While outwardly the most controlled of the Intoners, she holds a twisted inferiority complex, feeling jealous of her other sisters. She is also sexually repressed, being the only virgin Intoner. Her fingernails grow at a dangerous rate, and she uses hand-to-hand weapons and combat to mask it. Four is voiced by Cristina Valenzuela in English and Ayana Taketatsu in Japanese.
  - Five (ファイブ, Faibu) – Ruler of the Land of Seas. Boasting the largest sex drive among the sisters, she has an insatiable greed, lusting for everything and losing interest when she has it. One of her biggest obsessions is with Zero. As with the other sisters, a part of her grows at an unnatural rate: in Five's case, her breasts. Five is voiced by Megan Hollingshead in English and Shizuka Itō in Japanese.
- Disciples (Note: Apostles (使徒達, Shito-tachi)) - Beings created by Zero during an attempt to destroy the Intoners: during a battle in the Cathedral City, Zero uses a passing flock of doves to siphon away her sisters' powers. The doves became connected to the Intoners, morphing into human form. They act both as a means of controlling an Intoner's power, and relieving their sexual needs. After Zero kills each of her sisters, she takes in their disciple, with them acting as a personal harem and aids in battle.
  - Cent (セント, Sento) – Two's Apostle. Appearing cultured, he is a compulsive liar who invents trivia to make him seem knowledgeable. Around Zero, he acts as a loud-mouthed idiot, while in Two's presence he is caring and dedicated to her service. Cent is voiced by Ryōtarō Okiayu in Japanese and Liam O'Brien in English.
  - Octa (オクタ, Okuta) – Three's Apostle. He is the oldest disciple in appearance, and extremely cunning. He also has an insatiable sexual appetite, showing this in both his actions and his words. Octa is voiced by Chafūrin in Japanese and Todd Haberkorn in English.
  - Decadus (デカート, Decāto) – Four's Apostle. He is fiercely loyal to her and is willing to die for her. While outwardly gentlemanly, he is a masochist, taking delight in any form of pain or punishment, including interpreting putdowns from Four as a punishment. Decadus is voiced by Kazuhiko Inoue in Japanese and Cam Clarke in English.
  - Dito (ディト) – Five's Apostle. He holds a potent hatred for his mistress Five, and has a sadistic streak in his character, enjoying the suffering and death of others. Dito is voiced by Mitsuki Saiga in Japanese and Yuri Lowenthal in English.
- Mikhail (ミハイル, Mihairu) – Also known as Michael (ミカエル, Mikaeru), he acts as Zero's partner, having been sought out by her as only dragons could destroy the spawn of the flower: after helping her kill her sisters, Micheal would kill Zero. In a battle with the Intoners, Micheal is fatally wounded protecting Zero. Reincarnated as the child dragon Mikhail, he follows Zero on her quest to take down each of the sisters and forms a close bond with her. Despite this, in his child form he is an incurable pacifist who often clashes with Zero's agenda. Mikhail is voiced by Nao Tōyama in Japanese and Cindy Robinson in English. Michael is voiced by Shinnosuke Ikehata in Japanese and Paul St. Peter in English.
- Gabriella (ガブリエラ, Gaburiera) – Also known as Gabriel (ガブリエル, Gaburieru), Gabriella acted as One's dragon companion as Micheal had done for Zero. They form their alliance as they share the wish to protect the world. One and Gabriella became close enough that, when Gabriella willingly became a beast to save One from Zero, One formed a pact with her to save her. Due to Michael's great strength, Gabriella willingly underwent an empowering transformation that destroyed her mind, transforming her into Gabriel. Voiced by Riki Kitazawa in Japanese and Mona Marshall in English.
- One (ワン, Wan) – A male clone created by One to fill the place of a disciple, crafted using one of One's ribs and the magical power of the Cathedral City. He was also designed as a failsafe in case his sister fell to Zero. After fulfilling his duty, he undergoes an identity crisis and establishes the Cult of Watchers to worship "One". The male One is the main protagonist of the manga Drag-On Dragoon: Shi ni Itaru Aka, in which he seeks to atone for his actions by killing his descendants and destroying both the Cult and those who have fallen under the Watchers' spell. The male One is voiced by Yūichi Iguchi in Japanese and Brian Beacock in English.
- Accord (アコール, Akōru) – A character introduced in Drakengard 3. She is a "Recorder", one of a line of androids sent from the "Old World" to record history, including the multiple timelines generated by "singularities". The version of Accord assigned to follow the events of Drakengard 3 is initially detached as her function requires, but ultimately intervenes in events during the events leading up to its fourth ending. After her destruction, multiple replacements arrive to record events. She will appear as a mention in Nier: Automata. Accord is voiced by Ami Koshimizu in Japanese and Eden Riegel in English.

== Nier universe ==
=== Nier ===
- Protagonist - The main protagonist, and Replicant of Shadowlord (魔王, Maō), ruler of the Gestalts and the game's main antagonist. During the course of the game, he first sets out to cure his daughter/sister of a deadly disease, then rescuing her from the Shadowlord. He appears as a teenage boy in the original Nier and the Nier: Replicant remake, with a timeskip to an older teenager; whereas he appears as an adult man in Nier: Gestalt. He is voiced in English by Jamieson Price. In Japanese, he is voiced by Nobuhiko Okamoto in his younger years, and Kōji Yusa as an older teenager.
- Yonah (ヨナ, Yona) - A young girl who is Nier's sister in the original Nier and the Nier: Replicant remake, and daughter in Gestalt. Yonah becomes infected with a deadly disease, with Nier hunting for a cure. She is kidnapped by the Shadowlord as she is the Replicant for the Shadowlord's sister. Yonah is voiced by Heather Hogan in English and Ai Nonaka in Japanese.
- Kainé (カイネ, Kaine) - The main female protagonist and companion to Nier. Ostracized from her village for being both an intersexual and being partially possessed by a Shade calling itself Tyrann, she encounters Nier during her quest to avenge the death of her grandmother, who was the only person who treated her kindly. After defeating the Shade, Kainé joins Nier on his quest to save Yonah. Eventually, Kainé begins to develop feelings for Nier, develops a sisterly bond with Emil and remains strongly antagonistic towards Grimoire Weiss. Kainé is voiced by Laura Bailey in English and Atsuko Tanaka in Japanese.
- Emil (エミール, Emīru) - Originally a human child, Emil was created as a weapon to petrify his "sister" No.6. Designated as No.7, he sealed away his sister, but he was left with eyes that petrified anyone he looks at. After his origins are discovered and No.6 is defeated by Nier, Emil absorbs his sister's power, taking on a skeletal appearance. Emil is voiced by Julie Ann Taylor in English and Mai Kadowaki in Japanese.
- Grimoire Weiss (グリモア・ヴァイス, Gurimoa Vaisu) - Originally a human, Weiss was converted into a Grimoire, a sentient book infused with power key to successfully completing Project Gestalt. He is the source of Nier's magical abilities, "loaned" to him by Devola and Popola. Across the game, he is constantly irritated by people not calling him by his full title. Weiss is voiced by Liam O'Brien in English and Shinnosuke Ikehata in Japanese.
- Devola (デボル, Deboru) and Popola (ポポル, Poporu) - Twin artificial beings created to oversee Project Gestalt. According to Devola, they were created as twins to offset the loneliness of the desolated Earth. While initially supportive of Nier and his quest, they turn against him when he heads to kill the Shadowlord and threatens Project Gestalt. In their battle with him, Devola is killed, and Popola goes berserk and is destroyed in a suicide attack. The twins are voiced by voiced by Eden Riegel in English and Ryoko Shiraishi in Japanese.
- Grimoire Noir (グリモア・ノアール, Gurimoa Noāru) - A minor antagonist and companion to the Shadowlord. One of many humans transformed into sentient books. Grimoire Noir is first encountered by Weiss and the others: Noir tries to absorb Weiss and fulfill their function, but Weiss rejects him. The two later do battle in the Shadowlord's castle and Noir is destroyed. Noir is voiced by D. C. Douglas in English and Fumihiko Tachiki in Japanese.

=== Nier: Automata ===
- YoRHa No. 2 Model B (ヨルハ二号B型, Yoruha Ni-gō B-gata), or 2B for short, is the main protagonist of Nier: Automata. A cold and level-headed android, she is part of YoRHa, an organization fighting to free Earth from Machine occupation. 2B is voiced by Yui Ishikawa in Japanese and Kira Buckland in English.
- YoRHa No.9 Type S (ヨルハ九号S型, Yoruha Kyū-gō S-gata), commonly called 9S and informally "Nines", is a YoRHa squadron "Scanner" reconnaissance model known for his outgoing personality and curiosity about the world and the Machine Lifeforms. 9S is voiced by Natsuki Hanae in Japanese, and Kyle McCarley in English.
- YoRHa Type A No.2 (ヨルハA型二号, Yoruha A-gata ni-gō), commonly called A2, is a YoRHa prototype. Initially sent as part of a disposable test run on a mission to destroy a Machine server at Ka'ala, she survives and pursues a vendetta against both YoRHa and the Machine Lifeforms. A2 is voiced by Ayaka Suwa in Japanese and Cherami Leigh in English.

== Reception and legacy ==
Drakengard's characters were positively received upon the game's release. IGN's Jeremy Dunham praised both the game's dark setting and the characters' realistic portrayals: both were compared favorably to the characters and atmosphere of Neon Genesis Evangelion. VideoGamer.com's Adam Jarvis and the reviewer for Computer and Video Games (CVG) both praised the characters' dialogue. Jarvis called the dialogue "beautiful", while the CVG reviewer called it "mature" and "witty", and saying it competed with and occasionally surpassed the standard dialogue found in other role-playing games of the time. GameSpot's Greg Kavasin said that the main cast "while not terribly well developed, is interesting and rather unconventional". Drakengard 2 drew a more mixed response. Eurogamer's Simon Parkin was highly critical of protagonist Nowe, citing several points where his behavior was unbelievable given the situation, eventually calling him "a little nauseating to watch". The reviewer for GameTrailers also seemed unimpressed by any aspect of the narrative, citing it as a "cookie-cutter RPG plot". Greg Meuller of GameSpot negatively noted the lighter tone of the sequel, but praised the villains and the voice acting, although said that "a couple of the voices do tend to get annoying, which is unfortunate, since they happen to be the voices you'll hear the most".

The characters of Drakengard 3 received a similarly mixed reception from critics. RPGFan's Derek Heemsbergen called the dialogue between the characters "strange and often hilarious", despite some stumbles. GameSpot's Heidi Kemps also commented on the inter-character dialogue, calling it "frequently amusing and well written", and commended the localization team for their work. GamesRadar's Becky Cunningham generally praised the voice acting for the characters, and stated that the relationship between Mikhail and Zero "adds gravitas to the story." Destructoid's Chris Carter generally found the characters engaging, and said that the dialogue was "not laugh out loud funny all the time, but I found myself smiling and chuckling consistently throughout." IGN's Meghan Sullivan was mainly negative about the characters, citing their dialogue as poorly written. Game Informer's Kimberley Wallace was unimpressed with the writing or characters, stating that, despite some good one-liners from Zero, the game's "attempts at quirky humor fail".

Reactions to Nier's characters were generally positive. GameSpot's Kevin VanOrd found most of the characters entertaining, although he found Nier a bland character, and thought that Kainé's swearing clashed with the game's atmosphere. Dustin Quillen of 1UP was very positive, saying that the game sported "a supporting cast of genuinely interesting folks". Seth Schiesel of The New York Times said that Nier "succeeds at fostering an emotional investment in its characters and in its world". IGN's Brian Clements praised the characters' voice acting, calling it "quite excellent".

The characters of the main series have been popular in Japan. When Dengeki held a popularity contest for the characters to celebrate both the series' tenth anniversary and the announcement of Drakengard 3, Caim, Angelus, Nowe, Urick and Manah were among the most popular characters. Caim has earned the nickname Prince (王子, Ōji) among fans of the games. The characters of Drakengard 3 were also popular, with Zero and Mikail ranking high in a second Dengeki survey after the third game's release. Characters from the main series have been featured in the Lord of Vermilion arcade game series alongside characters from other Square Enix franchises.
