= Caim (Drakengard) =

Fictional character in Drakengard

- Drakengard character
- Official artwork by Kimihiko Fujisaka for Drakengard
- First appearance: Drakengard (2003)
- Created by: Takuya Iwasaki
- Designed by: Kimihiko Fujisaka
- Voiced by: JA Peter; EN Fleet Cooper

Caim (Japanese: カイム, Hepburn: Kaimu) is the main protagonist of the 2003 action role-playing video game Drakengard by Cavia. An orphan knight working for the Union, Caim swears vengeance against the Empire for killing his parents, while protecting a seal and his sister to avoid the land's destruction. Mortally wounded in battle, Caim makes a pact with the dragon Angelus to save himself and obtain the dragon's power, sacrificing his own voice. The character returns as an antagonist in the 2005 sequel Drakengard 2, in which Caim is on a quest to free Angelus from the painful burden of the seals controlling her body and has taken the alias of "One-Eyed Man" (隻眼の男, Sekigan no Otoko). He has also been featured in printed media based on the games and has been referenced in the spin-off game Nier.

Co-producer Takuya Iwasaki created the protagonist of Drakengard with influence from the Berserk manga protagonist Guts. The game's director Yoko Taro described Caim as an examination of action game heroes of the time. Artist Kimihiko Fujisaka was not satisfied with Caim's "bland" design in Drakengard and redesigned his look as a wanderer figure for Drakengard 2. Caim is voiced in Japanese by Peter (Shinnosuke Ikehata) and in English by Fleet Cooper.

Critique about Caim focused on his antihero status, unusually violent personality, and his poor relationships with other characters—traits rarely seen in role-playing games. Reviewers praised his unique dynamic with Angelus, both in the narrative and gameplay. They compared him to the protagonists of subsequent games in the series, including Nier and Drakengard 3, who are also notorious for having similar dark characterizations.

== Appearances ==
A middle aged Caim as the One-Eyed Man in Drakengard 2.

Drakengard opens with the Union knight Caim in the midst of a battle to protect his sister Furiae from the Empire. Mortally wounded, Caim and the dragon Angelus make a pact in order to save each other. With the attack repelled, Caim and the priest Verdelet travel to each of the three Seals that are needed to protect the world but arrive too late to stop them from being destroyed. Eventually, the Union and the Empire engage in battle, and the Union emerges victorious. After the battle, however, the Union's surviving troops are decimated by an unknown force from above, and the Empire's troops return to life. Caim and Angelus travel to an Imperial fortress that has appeared in the sky, where they find that Furiae has committed suicide as a result of the shame of her incestuous feelings towards Caim being revealed. Furiae's death causes the destruction of the final seal. However, after Caim defeats Manah, the leader of the cult that controls the Empire, Angelus offers her life to protect the seal for Caim's sake.

In the second ending of Drakengard, Caim is forced to kill a resurrected Furiae; however, clones of her are produced beforehand from other Seeds to destroy humanity. In the third ending, new dragons are driven to destroy mankind, leading to the protagonist's sacrifice in battle. In the fourth ending, the antagonistc Watchers descend on the Imperial capital, leading to a mortal battle with Caim. In the fifth ending, Caim and Angelus encounter the queen monster in modern-day Tokyo but are shot down by a fighter jet.

Drakengard 2 takes place nearly two decades after the events of the first game and uses an ending where Angelus sacrificed herself to protect a seal. Caim is an antagonist working to destroy the seals and free Angelus from the pain of being the Goddess Seal. Caim kills the knight Urick resulting in the seal being destroyed. This frees Angelus, but she is still in great pain and is killed by Nowe to relieve her suffering. Caim dies with her, both being consumed by fire.

Caim's role in Drakengard was retold in two novelizations by Emi Nagashima (pen name Jun Eishima) and Takashi Aizawa. The game's events were also retold in a special story titled Drakengard 1.3, which followed from the spin-off manga Drag-On Dragoon: Shi ni Itaru Aka, which depicts Caim's backstory. Caim appeared in the Drakengard 2 novelization written by Nagashima. Although Caim is absent from Nier and Nier Automata, his appearance in modern Japan from the Drakengard fifth ending is mentioned as one of the causes of the world's chaos in Nier.

== Creation ==
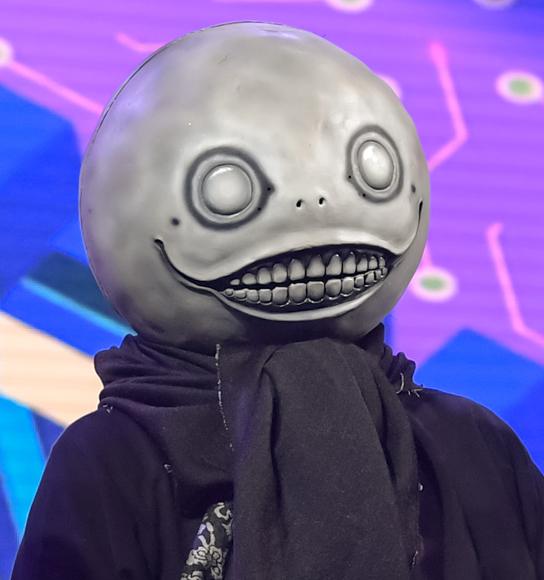
Drakengard director and writer Yoko Taro.

Drakengard co-producer Takuya Iwasaki created the original framework for the game including the main character Caim. The game's director Yoko Taro described Caim as an examination of the typical action-game hero of the time; he felt someone who had killed so many people should not have a happy ending. Yoko had little involvement in Caim's story, claiming not to remember most of it. The relationship between Caim and his dragon companion Angelus evolved during development: Yoko initially planned for the relationship to be parasitic, but Iwasaki instead wrote their relationship as an unconventional romance between a young man (Caim) and an older woman (Angelus).

A core plot point is the relationship between Caim, his friend-turned-rival Inuart, and Caim's sister Furiae, who harbored romantic feelings towards her brother. Yoko drew inspiration for Furiae's incestuous feelings from the anime Sister Princess; he remembered creating an ending based around it but changed it based on negative feedback from staff. Inuart was originally designed as the main protagonist, with him being a "useless hero"; Yoko intended the scene where he first clashes with Caim to show the game's tone.

=== Design ===
Caim was designed by character designer Kimihiko Fujisaka and was one of the earliest characters created for the game. The character's role as a dragon rider was present from early in production, when the game was intended to emulate the Ace Combat series. Caim was based on Guts, the lead protagonist of the manga Berserk, and was codenamed "Guts" during development. In hindsight, Fujisaka was dissatisfied with his work on Drakengard, particularly Caim who he felt was "too bland" and designed to be easy to model in-game rather than distinctive. When summing up Caim's outfit, co-producer Takamasa Shiba described the design as "the result of giving an ancient piece of armour to a modern Japanese designer and seeing what they would come up with." Fujisaka redesigned Caim for Drakengard 2. He felt this redesign was an improvement on the original; the redesign was meant to represent Caim's status as a wanderer. Fujisaka also took elements of Caim's original design and incorporated them into those of lead characters Nowe and Manah, intending to represent "passing the torch" between characters.

=== Portrayal ===
Shiba drew parallels between Caim and the cast of Neon Genesis Evangelion as individuals who use supernatural beings to fight even if they do not want to, with Caim's sole motivation being to save his sister. Shiba wanted Caim's portrayal as a dragon knight to be unique in order for Drakengard to be more original than Dynasty Warriors, which he planned to compete against. He also aimed for the fights with the dragon to affect the protagonist's personality. Seeing Caim as too violent for a protagonist, Yoko considered using monsters as antagonists to make Caim more heroic in contrast. Iwasaki wanted the game's multiple endings to influence Caim's morals without making any of them a true ending, so that the player can freely choose. Furiae was designed by Yoko as both an explanation for Caim and Inuart's rivalry and as a representation of his distaste for the kind of forgettable character she represented. The relationship between Caim and Furiae, as well as their ultimate fates, was Yoko's response to the standard happy ending found in most role-playing games of the time, and tying into his examination of Caim. Caim returned for Drakengard 2, taking on the role of an antagonist, eventually dying alongside Angelus. Their deaths were intended to be "short and ruthless", but the game's director, Akira Yasui, made it more sentimental. Caim's dialogue in the scene was cut from the game, due to it clashing with his previous portrayal as a mute.

The actor who voiced both Caim and Angelus in Japanese is Peter (also credited as Shinnosuke Ikehata). Though originally cast for the role of Caim, Peter's versatility led to him also voicing Angelus. While describing a later design as "pretty", Peter stated that they had few strong feelings connected to voicing Caim. Peter would return to voice other characters in later Drakengard projects. In English, Caim is voiced by Fleet Cooper, who also voiced Inuart.

== Critical reception ==
Critics from IGN and Computer and Video Games praised Caim for his partnership with Angelus and for his overly violent personality, which was seen as uncommon in games. A GamesBeat writer opined that Caim's sacrifice of his voice in the game's beginning made the narrative difficult to understand until the protagonist starts interacting with Angelus, adding that Caim teaming up with the dragon helped differentiate the game from the Dynasty Warriors franchise. Reviewing Drakengard 2, GameRant's Chad Thesen found Caim's role as the villain fitting and praised him as one of the best antiheroes in Japanese role-playing games. TheGamer argued that despite Drakengard's multiple routes, Caim's role in the sequel was consistent with his brutal side, ending up tragic when he dies fighting a relative. The reviewer also noted that one ending featuring Caim leading to the game Nier was originally written as a joke. When the anime adaptation of Nier: Automata, Nier: Automata Ver1.1a, referenced Caim's death in modern Japan as the event that ultimately led to the world of Nier, Anime News Network called it a "shitpost" that became important to the franchise's canon.

Critics highlighted Caim's violent characterization. RPGFan writers described him as the opposite of heroic archetypes commonly seen in role-playing games because of his violent nature and believed the cast did not deserve happy endings, particularly when the game's world is in danger. Willia Rowe from Inverse remarked that although all characters appear to be despicable, Caim's violent nature and incestuous overtones toward his sister make him the most contemptible character. In the game, the cast works to save the world from ending, but Rowe argued that the game's design appears to incite resentment from the player towards Caim. Davis A. from Digitally Downloaded wrote that Caim's portrayal does not fit the archetype of his initial appearance as a prince with traditional attire and weaponry.

Caim has been compared to other video game characters, particularly those created by Yoko Taro. VideoGamer.com compared the cast to Final Fantasy archetypes but considered them inferior due to the game's visuals. Kat Bailey of VG247.com described Caim as a playable "serial killer" and praised both his portrayal and the dark personas of his companions. Bailey drew parallels to Nier, where the player is unaware they are helping the unnamed protagonist commit genocide across the playthrough, preventing the game's endings from being viewed as truly happy. She also compared Caim to Zero from Drakengard 3 for their similar brutal actions, concluding that both are "little more than two-dimensional cutouts in an ocean of blood". Jake Buchalter from GameRant made a similar comparison with Nier due to their violent traits and appearance. A. Fernández de Marticorena Gallego of the University of the Balearic Islands described Caim's journey in modern Japan as one of the strangest ways to end a story, especially since Nier chooses this route to start the plot.
