= SINoALICE =

2017 role-playing video game

- Developer: Pokelabo
- Publishers: JP: Square Enix; WW: Pokelabo
- Director: Yoko Taro
- Producers: Shogo Maeda; Hideyuki Mizutani; Yoshinari Fujimoto
- Designer: Ryoki Matsuo
- Artists: Takuya Miura; Jino
- Composers: Keiichi Okabe; Keigo Hoashi; Shotaro Seo
- Platforms: Android, iOS
- Release: JP: June 6, 2017; WW: July 1, 2020
- Genre: Role-playing game
- Modes: Single-player, multiplayer

SINoALICE (Note: Japanese: シノアリス, Hepburn: Shinoarisu) was a role-playing video game developed by Pokelabo for Android and iOS. The game was directed by Yoko Taro, better known for his work in the Drakengard and NieR series. The game was released in Japan by Square Enix in June 2017, and worldwide by Pokelabo in July 2020.

The global version of the game shut down its servers in November 2023, while the Japanese servers on DMM.com were shut down in December 2023, and the mobile servers shut down in January 2024.

== Plot ==
In a world called Library filled with countless stories, the Characters within each story wish to revive their author for their desired future. To do so, they work together to gather life essence and fight the Nightmares that devour stories, knowing they will inevitably have to kill each other to get their wish.

== Development ==
The game was originally supposed to be published by Nexon outside of Japan but was delayed indefinitely due to localisation reasons. The game's publishing was then handed over to Pokelabo. The game's soundtrack was scored by Keiichi Okabe, Keigo Hoashi, and Shotaro Seo.

== Reception ==
Reception

Aggregate score
Aggregator	Score
Metacritic	58/100

Review score
Publication	Score
Hardcore Droid	2.5/5

The game received a "mixed or average" rating according to review aggregator Metacritic.

Hardcore Droid said that "Amazing visuals and audio can’t make up for the stale story lines and over-complicated class system. However, the wave style combat mode saves the day with its unique monsters and stylish attacks."

== Manga adaptation ==
A manga adaptation, illustrated by himiko, started serialization on the MangaUp! service in 2019. In July 2021, Square Enix announced they had licensed the manga for English publication. The manga ended with the release of its sixth volume on January 6, 2024.

== Film adaptation ==
A film adaptation, SINoALICE: The Very Last Story, was released in Japanese theaters on February 23, 2024. Considered a "fan film" or "film for the fans", the film serves as an alternate story and ending for SINoALICE. The film was directed by Aoki Tact, written by Yoko Taro, and animated by ILCA.
