= Sōta Murakami =

Japanese actor and voice actor (born 1991)

- Born: October 27, 1991 (age 34); Japan
- Occupations: Actor, voice actor
- Years active: 1990s – present

Sōta Murakami (村上想太, Murakami Sōta; born October 27, 1991) is a Japanese actor and voice actor.

== Roles ==
=== Television drama ===
- Ai no Inoie ~ Nakimushi Sato to Shichinin to Ko
- Bengoshi Sako Mariko no Yuigon Sakusei File
- Matamo ya Metaka Teishu-dono ~Bakumatsu no Meibugyū: Ogurikōzukenosuke~
- Oyajii.
- Sawayaka 3 Kumi

=== Television animation ===
- Umigame to Shōnen (Kenta)

=== Theatrical animation ===
- Kappa no Coo to Natsuyasumi (Kōichi's Classmate)
- Momoko, Kaeru no Uta Gakikoeru yo (Kenta Yoshida)

=== Video games ===
- Drag-On Dragoon (Seere)
- Drag-On Dragoon 2: Fūin no Aka, Haitoku no Kuro (Seere)

=== Dubbing roles ===
==== Live action ====
- A.I. Artificial Intelligence (Martin Swinton (Jake Thomas))
- Batman Begins (DVD edition) (Bruce Wayne (young) (Gus Lewis))
- The Blue Butterfly (Pete Carlton)
- The Book of Pooh (Christopher Robin (Paul Tiesler))
- Les Choristes (Pierre Morhange (young) (Jean-Baptiste Maunier))
- The Devil's Backbone (Carlos (Fernando Tielve))
- E.T. the Extra-Terrestrial (20th-anniversary edition) (Elliot (Henry Thomas))
- Friend (Jeong-ho)
- Goal! (Additional voices)
- The Haunting (Ritchie (Saul Priever))
- Jumong (Onjo of Baekje (Kim Seok))
- Millions (Anthony Cunningham)
- Kung Fu Hustle (Additional voices)
- Peter Pan (John Darling (Harry Newell))
- Shanghai Knights (Charlie Chaplin (Aaron Taylor-Johnson))
- Signs (DVD edition) (Morgan Hess (Rory Culkin))
- Stand by Me (Blu-ray edition) (Chris Chambers (River Phoenix))
- Treasure Island (DVD edition) (Jim Hawkins (Bobby Driscoll))

==== Animation ====
- The Jungle Book 2 (Mowgli)
- The Lion King 1½ (Young Simba)
- Piglet's Big Movie (Christopher Robin)
- Return to Never Land (Nibs)
- Robots (Additional voices)

=== Commercials ===
- Digital Monsters Card Game

=== Stage ===
- Sans Famille
