= Drakengard (video game) =

2003 action role-playing video game

- North American PlayStation 2 box art
- Developers: Cavia; Macrospace (Mobile)
- Publisher: Square Enix: PAL: Gathering of Developers
- Director: Yoko Taro
- Producers: Takamasa Shiba; Takuya Iwasaki
- Designers: Akira Yasui; Hiroaki Kotake
- Programmers: Toshiyuki Koike; Takeshi Katayama
- Artist: Kimihiko Fujisaka
- Writers: Yoko Taro; Sawako Natori
- Composers: Nobuyoshi Sano; Takayuki Aihara
- Series: Drakengard
- Platforms: PlayStation 2, Mobile
- Release: PlayStation 2: JP: September 11, 2003; NA: March 2, 2004; PAL: May 21, 2004; Mobile: PAL: August 2004
- Genres: Action role-playing, hack and slash
- Mode: Single-player

Drakengard, known in Japan as Drag-On Dragoon, (Note: Japanese: ドラッグ オン ドラグーン, Hepburn: Doraggu On Doragūn) is a 2003 action role-playing video game developed by Cavia and published by Square Enix for the PlayStation 2. The game is the first installment of the Drakengard series and features a mixture of ground-based hack-and-slash, aerial combat, and role-playing elements which have become a staple of the series. The story is set during a religious war between two factions—the Union and the Empire—with the war tipping in favor of the Empire. The player controls Caim, a deposed prince of the Union, in his quest for vengeance against the Empire. Wounded in battle while protecting his sister Furiae, he is forced to make a pact with a red dragon named Angelus as they journey together on a quest to prevent the Empire from destroying magical seals that keep the world in balance.

Takamasa Shiba and Takuya Iwasaki conceived the game as a hybrid between the popular Dynasty Warriors series and Namco's aerial combat game Ace Combat. It was Shiba's first project as a producer. The dark story was created by director Yoko Taro and Sawako Natori, who wrote the majority of the script. The music was written by Nobuyoshi Sano and Takayuki Aihara. A Europe-exclusive mobile adaptation was developed by Macrospace and published by Square Enix for Vodafone devices in August 2004. Drakengard sold well in Japan and received mixed to positive reviews in the west: reviewers praised the game's story and music, but were mixed about the graphics and criticized the gameplay for being repetitive.

== Gameplay ==
The on-foot and aerial combat, featuring protagonists Caim and Angelus

Drakengard is an action role-playing video game featuring three types of gameplay: ground missions, aerial missions, and Free Expedition Mode. The gameplay modes are called Ground Mode, Strafe Mode, and Air Mode. In some levels, players can switch between ground-based and aerial combat. Ground-based gameplay primarily has the player controlling the main protagonist, Caim. He has access to three types of attack: a standard sword-slash, a magic attack and a dash attack that throws enemies to the ground. Additional weapons can be accessed and swapped via the menu. Weapons gain experience levels through use, dealing more damage as a result. Each has a four-level cap. The player can access up to eight weapons during a mission. Pressing the attack button repeatedly while in combat with enemy units triggers combos, and pressing another button mid-combo will trigger a special attack which will temporarily incapacitate enemy units in the immediate area. The player can also temporarily switch between Caim and an assigned ally, who shares similar attacks but deals more damage. These allies are gained in optional levels and can only be summoned a limited number of times.

In aerial combat missions, players control Caim's dragon partner Angelus. During these moments, players are directed against multiple aerial targets that must be destroyed in order to win. As Angelus gains experience points through combat, she levels up and is able to do more damage – similar to the weapons used in ground-based combat. Boss battles are all located in these aerial stages. Angelus has access to two types of standard fire attacks: a free-aim blast that causes high damage, and homing bolts that can hit multiple targets but do less damage. Homing shots can be dodged or countered by some enemy types later in the game. Angelus can also perform a special area-affecting magical attack that damages or kills multiple enemy units. She can be used to quickly traverse battle areas during primarily ground-based missions. Players can summon Angelus during certain ground-based missions and play her in Strafe Mode. Controls are identical to ground-based combat. Pressing the select button causes Caim to dismount Angelus. Caim and Angelus level up during combat in different ways: as Caim levels up, their shared health meter grows, while Angelus' leveling increases the damage her attacks do to enemy units.

Players can navigate the game world and select missions via a world map accessed between levels. While playing, a mini-map allows the player to see enemy locations, and a full-screen map can be switched to that covers the entire area and shows mission objectives. Drakengard's levels are called verses, and the verses are grouped across thirteen chapters. Each level has a time limit of one hour for players to complete them. Normal levels are numbered, while additional levels are marked by Roman numerals. The game features five endings: the normal ending and four additional endings which are unlocked when certain conditions are met, such as completing optional chapters or obtaining powerful weapons.

== Synopsis ==
=== Setting and characters ===
Drakengard takes place in a medieval dark fantasy world called Midgard. The world is protected from falling into chaos by the Seals, objects magically linked to a woman chosen as the Goddess of the Seal. If the seals and the Goddess were destroyed, malevolent beings known as the Watchers (Note: Watchers; Angels (天使, Tenshi) in the Japanese version.) would enter the world to destroy humanity. A key element of the world is the ability for a human and a beast to form a pact, (Note: Pact; Contract (契約, Keiyaku) in the Japanese version.) a ritual that ties their souls together and grants great power. Their lives become bound by the pact, and the human pays a price for it in the form of some attribute (e.g. their voice, their eyesight or their ability to age). During the events of Drakengard, the Union, which protects the Seals, is in the midst of a religious war with the Empire, a power led by a cult who believe that destroying the seals will bring them good fortune.

The main characters are Caim (カイム, Kaimu), a deposed prince of the Union, and Angelus (アンヘル, Anheru; lit. "Angel"), a red dragon. Joining Caim and Angelus in optional sections of the story are Leonard (レオナール, Reonāru), a hermit who loses his brothers in an attack by the Empire; Arioch (アリオーシュ, Ariōshu), an elf woman driven mad by the murder of her family; and Seere (セエレ, Sēre), a young boy from the Empire whose village was destroyed by the cult's devotees. Other prominent characters are Furiae (フリアエ, Furiae), Caim's sister and the current Goddess of the Seal; Inuart (イウヴァルト, Iuvaruto), Furiae's former fiancé; Verdelet (ヴェルドレ, Verudore), a priest in charge of protecting the Goddess Seal; and Manah (マナ, Mana), Seere's sister, leader of the enemy cult and the game's main antagonist.

=== Plot ===
Drakengard opens with Caim in the midst of a battle to protect his sister from the Empire. During the battle, Caim is mortally injured, but continues to fight his way into Furiae's castle, where he finds Angelus severely wounded from torture. Despite their mutual mistrust, Caim and Angelus agree to make a pact and save each other. With the attack repelled, Caim is joined by Furiae and Inuart to find safety, encountering Verdelet on their travels. Inuart is captured, tortured and brainwashed by Manah, eventually kidnapping Furiae in the belief that he can save her from her fate as the Goddess and earn her love. Verdelet and Caim travel to each of the three Seals, but each time arrive too late to stop them being destroyed. Eventually, the Union and the Empire engage in battle, and the Union emerge victorious. After the battle, however, the Union's surviving troops are decimated by an unknown force from above, and the Empire's troops return to life. Caim and Angelus travel to an Imperial fortress that has appeared in the sky, where they find that Furiae has killed herself, breaking the final seal. Inuart, seeing her body, is released from his brainwashing and takes her away.

Optional missions allow Caim to find and recruit Leonard and Seere, and take along Arioch to protect others from her madness. Subsequent playthroughs and extra chapters reveal further details about the characters. Leonard's self-imposed seclusion is because he was trying to suppress his pedophilia, and the guilt at his brothers' deaths stems from the fact that he gave in to his cravings and left them unprotected. Arioch's madness takes the form of cannibalism of children, in the belief that they would be safe from harm within her. Furiae is revealed to love Caim romantically, which led to Inuart becoming jealous and vulnerable to Manah's influence. During the events leading to the third ending, Manah reveals Furiae's feelings for Caim, who shows revulsion at the revelation: due to this and the Watchers' influence, Furiae stabs herself. Manah was abused by her and Seere's mother, but Seere was never subjected to the abuse, leading him to feel guilty. The abuse Manah received and her longing for love eventually drove her insane, and she was chosen to become the Watchers' agent.

There are five possible endings, four of which are unlocked after fulfilling certain conditions.

- In the first ending, Caim and Angelus confront Manah and defeat her. Manah asks them to kill her, but Angelus declares that she must live with her crimes. Angelus then offers herself as the new Goddess of the Seal for Caim's sake. As Verdelet performs the ritual, Angelus tells Caim her name before fading away.
- In the second ending. Inuart uses a magical object called a "Seed of Resurrection" (Note: Seed of Resurrection; Egg of Rebirth (復活の卵, Fukkatsu no Tamago) in the Japanese version.) to resurrect Furiae: while successful, the Seed turns her into a monster, and she kills Inuart. Caim is forced to kill her, but not before clones of her are produced from other Seeds to destroy humanity.
- In the third ending, after Furiae's suicide, Caim and Angelus stop Inuart's attempt to resurrect her and confront Manah, who is killed by another dragon. With the dragons now being driven to destroy mankind, Angelus breaks her pact with Caim and fights him to the death. Caim then prepares to die fighting the other dragons.
- In the fourth ending, Seere has his Golem pact partner kill the deranged Manah, causing the fortress to collapse. Caim, Seere, Leonard and Arioch escape, while Inuart and Furiae are killed inside. With Manah dead, the Watchers descend on the Imperial capital, with Leonard and Arioch dying at their hands. Caim and Angelus then sacrifice themselves to allow Seere to use his powers to seal the city and the Watchers in a timeless zone, nullifying their threat.
- In the fifth ending, instead of using Seere's power, Caim and Angelus instead attack the queen and the three disappear through a portal. After engaging the queen monster in a rhythm game in modern-day Tokyo, the two destroy it, and are then shot down by a fighter jet.

== Development ==
The original idea for Drakengard originated between Takamasa Shiba and Takuya Iwasaki when they were working at Cavia. It was conceived as an aerial battle game similar to Ace Combat. The four-year development was Shiba's first project as a producer. The team developing the game went under the moniker of "Project Dragonsphere". As development progressed, ground-based battles were also incorporated after the success in Japan of Dynasty Warriors 2. Creating the change from ground to aerial gameplay was exceptionally difficult for the team as they encountered problems with the PlayStation 2 hardware. Speaking in 2013, Shiba commented that Cavia had been inexperienced in creating action games, and as such it was not up to the standards of its contemporaries. The game's battle scenes were inspired by films such as the 1999 version of The Mummy and its spin-off The Scorpion King, as well as films like Dragonheart and epic films from Asia. Iwasaki was unable to take up the position of director because of other projects he was involved with: the position instead went to Yoko Taro, who was primarily responsible for the game's tone. The lead programmers were Toshiyuki Koike and Takeshi Katayama. The CGI cutscenes were created by Studio Anima. During production, the team were asked to make multiple adjustments and changes to its content by Drakengard's advisory board. It was annoying enough for Yoko that he decided at the time not to make another Drakengard. Yoko was worried that the dark tone would cause the game to go unreleased, so one of the game's external producers Yosuke Saito went to Sony with a pitch; Sony were so tired of reviewing pitches at the time that they approved the project without looking at it.

The game was originally announced in December 2002, then set to be published by Enix. Its date was announced the following year by Square Enix. It released in Japan on September 11, 2003. Drakengard was first shown off to the western public at E3 2003. Its title was changed for the Western release. The original Drag-On Dragoon title was chosen for its sound, but was not considered right for the western market. Because of this, it was changed to Drakengard. In addition, some of the more mature themes, such as references to incest and sexual taboos, were censored in the western localization. In North America, the game released on March 2, 2004. While Square Enix published the title in Japan and North America, Take-Two Interactive was chosen to publish it in European territories, releasing it on May 21. For this version, the game underwent major debugging and an alteration in the angle of the in-game camera. The mobile port was part of Square Enix's plans to branch out into the European mobile game market. It was co-developed with London-based mobile developer Macrospace as part of a collaboration between Square Enix and Vodafone, designed to function on the Vodafone live! service. It was first released in Germany, then made available in the United Kingdom, Spain and Italy.

=== World design ===
The setting, mythos and landscape were primarily inspired by the folklore of Northern Europe, while other elements drew from Japanese-style revisionism. According to Shiba, multiple elements of the story and world were created to be dark, sad and serious in tone, in contrast to the likes of Dragon Quest and Final Fantasy. One of the core narrative threads, involving romantic feelings between siblings, was inspired in Yoko's mind by the anime series Sister Princess. Another series that inspired the team was Neon Genesis Evangelion, with a comparison being drawn between them due to a shared trait: while having standard premises, darker narrative elements were hidden in its content. The central narrative theme was "Immorality", which was mostly demonstrated by writer Sawako Natori through the characters. Multiple endings were made because Yoko was told that the game would not have a sequel. The characters' stories were created by Yoko and Iwasaki, who independently created the character backgrounds: Yoko took charge of Seere, Leonard and Arioch, while Iwasaki was involved in developing Verdelet, Inuart and Caim. In an interview concerning her role in the game, Natori admitted to feeling embarrassed by her writing when hearing Sota Murakami and Natsuki Yamashita, who voiced Seere and Manah, speak their lines.

Caim, the main protagonist, was meant to be an examination of the typical action game hero, which Yoko felt should not have a happy ending in a story focused on violence. The nature of Caim and Angelus' relationship underwent changes during development: Yoko had conceived their relationship as a parasitic one, but Iwasaki wanted to create a different type of romance, and so wrote the love story for the two of them. The actor who portrayed the two was Shinnosuke Ikehata: though originally cast for the role of Caim, his versatility also got him the role of Angelus. Furiae was designed by Yoko as both an explanation for Caim and Inuart's rivalry, and as a representation of his distaste for the kind of forgettable character she represented. The relationship between Caim and Furiae, as well as their ultimate fates, was Yoko's response to the standard happy ending found in most role-playing games at the time, which he felt did not fit in with a protagonist who had killed hundreds during their quest. The second ending was principally inspired by this and his dislike for Sister Princess. Caim and Furiae were respectively based around Guts from Berserk and Rei Ayanami from Neon Genesis Evangelion, with Caim being codenamed "Guts" during development.

Inuart was originally designed as the main protagonist of Drakengard, with him being a "useless hero". A pivotal scene in the game, where he first clashes with Caim, became one of the ways Yoko was able to properly project his vision of the game's world. Verdelet was portrayed as the "despicable elder", who cared for no-one except himself: his personality was intended to be both ineffectual and bossy, even in the face of catastrophe. Manah's role in Drakengard was designed to represent unloved children. The fifth ending, a boss battle in modern-day Tokyo, was created as a joke ending in the same vein as the Silent Hill series and an unexpected twist for players who were expecting an upbeat tone after the previous endings. Titled the End of dragon sphere, this ending served as a tribute to The End of Evangelion.

Character designs were done by Kimihiko Fujisaka. Drakengard was his first job as a character designer: his designs were firmly seated within the Medieval European aesthetic. To achieve this, he imagined that he had been sent back to that historical period. His designs were inspired by the character designs of Final Fantasy and Dragon Quest. Caim was one of the earliest characters created for Drakengard. In Inuart's design, Fujisaka incorporated heavy armor into his design to give a more forceful impression for players. His ultimate role and final design were based around the idea of him being Caim's rival. The design of the black dragon, which acted as Inuart's pact beast, did not impress Shiba, who considered cutting it from the final product. Manah's red clothing was designed to evoke both its status as the game's key color, and her status as the leader of the Cult of the Watchers. Shiba approved of the design, feeling that it contrasted nicely with Furiae's predominantly white design. Fujisaka also helped design Furiae's monster form for the game's second ending. In hindsight, Fujisaka was dissatisfied with his work on Drakengard, particularly his work on Caim. The game's monsters were designed by Taro Hasegawa.

=== Music ===
The music was composed by Nobuyoshi Sano and Takayuki Aihara: the two used excerpts from pieces of classical music (selected by Aihara), then rearranged, remixed and layered them. Their main objective was to create music that emulated the gameplay, as well as the story and general narrative theme of "madness". The music was intended to be "experimental" and "expressionistic" rather than "commercial". The theme song, "Exhausted" (尽きる, Tsukiru), was composed by Sano, written by Natori and sung by Eriko Hatsune. The soundtrack was originally released in two volumes under the names Drag-On Dragoon Original Soundtrack Vol.1 and Drag-On Dragoon Original Soundtrack Vol.2, released on October 22 and November 21, 2003, respectively. The soundtrack was re-released on April 20, 2011, as a two-disc set under the title Drag-On Dragoon Original Soundtrack.

== Reception ==
Reception

Aggregate score
Aggregator	Score
Metacritic	63/100

Review scores
Publication	Score
Computer and Video Games	8/10
Edge	8/10
Famitsu	29/40
Game Informer	7.5/10
GameSpot	7/10
IGN	7.9/10
PlayStation: The Official Magazine	6/10
VideoGamer.com	6/10

Drakengard sold more than 122,000 units in its first week of release in Japan, taking Mobile Suit Gundam: Encounters in Space's place at the top of the sales charts. By the end of 2003, it had sold 241,014 copies. Gaming magazine Famitsu ranked it as the 50th best-selling title of 2003, and sold well enough that it was made part of Square Enix's Ultimate Hits series, re-releases of popular titles. Its strong sales were attributed by the team to its cinematic story and similarity to the popular Dynasty Warriors series. In Europe, the game sold 110,000 units by September 2004.

According to GameSpot, Drakengard received favorable reviews in Japan. Famitsu gave it an overall score of 29/40. After the game's reveal at E3, multiple video game publications, including Official PlayStation Magazine, IGN and Game Informer, praised its promising story and mixture of gameplay genres. The game received "average" reviews, according to video game review aggregator Metacritic.

The story received the highest amount of praise. IGN's Jeremy Dunham called it the game's "biggest strength", praising the edgy themes explored and the balance between fantasy and realism. He also praised the multiple parallels with Neon Genesis Evangelion. The reviewer for Computer and Video Games (CVG) praised "the maturity and wit of the dialogue and unfolding plot", noting that they stood alongside other Square Enix RPGs of the time. VideoGamer.com's Adam Jarvis praised the game's storytelling style, saying that while it became "a little bogged down at various points, it is deep enough to keep your interest throughout the game." GameSpot's Greg Kasavin said that "though the story itself is awkwardly paced and is sometimes difficult to keep up with, it becomes one of the main motivating factors for wanting to get all the way through to the end of the game."

The graphics received mixed responses. Kasavin said the game "looks decent but, ultimately, not all that good". He criticized the bland environments and awkward movements for enemy units and the playable character, but praised the design of the dragon. Game Informer was more positive, praising the graphical detail and cutscenes and the look of enemy units, despite finding pop-up issues and framerate dips. Jarvis praised the design of the main cast, but cited the repetitive enemy design and dark environments as detracting elements. Dunham praised the character and monster designs as well as the full-motion cutscenes, but was less impressed by the repetitive human enemy designs, bland environments and low draw distance. The full-motion videos were also praised by the CVG reviewer.

Reaction to the sound design was mixed to positive. Dunham praised the majority of the British-style voice acting, but called the music "disappointing". Game Informer cited the low number of background tracks and voice acting "straight out of a renaissance festival" as poorer parts of the game. Kasavin praised the voice acting and called the music "the most nerve-racking and most intense aspect of the game." Jarvis was also positive, praising the sound design for battles, most of the voice acting and the music, which "[helped] create a suitably dark atmosphere."

Reception of the gameplay was mixed to negative, with Dunham saying it suffered the same problems as its derivative games despite its easy entertainment value, while Jarvis called the options in gameplay "fairly limited". The CVG reviewer praised the aerial segments of gameplay, calling them the most entertaining, and found that the standard combat served to embellish the protagonist's "kick-ass persona, making him more than just another anonymous dragon rider". The main criticism was repetition in the gameplay. Kasavin was exceptionally critical, saying that the gameplay both made the process of playing laborious and detracted from the main story. Game Informer called the gameplay "fun, but [lacking] any semblance of depth."

== Legacy ==
Drakengard received two novelizations by Emi Nagashima (writing as Jun Eishima) and Takashi Aizawa. The game's events were retold again in a special story titled Drakengard 1.3, which followed on from the spin-off manga Drag-On Dragoon: Shi ni Itaru Aka. In March 2014, Hardcore Gamer's Jahanzeb Khan favorably referred to the game as a precursor to Game of Thrones in its handling of taboo themes and violence. The game was considered successful enough in Japan by Square Enix that a sequel was commissioned. Drakengard 2 was again produced by Shiba, but Yoko was replaced as director by Akira Yasui, resulting in numerous thematic changes. Originally set following the first ending of Drakengard, it was later retconned into an isolated timeline. A prequel, Drakengard 3, was released in 2013, with multiple staff members returning to their original roles.

An attempt to create another title in the series resulted in the spin-off Nier, which retains links and themes from the main series. Nier takes place over a thousand years after the events of Drakengard's fifth ending. When Cavia was absorbed by AQ Interactive after Nier's release, a future attempt by Shiba to continue the series was unsuccessful. A sequel, Nier: Automata, was developed by PlatinumGames in collaboration with previous Nier staff and released in 2017, taking place after Nier's fourth ending.
