= Cavia (company) =

Japanese video game developer

Cavia Inc.
- Native name: 株式会社キャビア
- Romanized name: Kabushiki gaisha Kyabia
- Type: Subsidiary
- Industry: Video games
- Founded: March 1, 2000; 26 years ago
- Defunct: July 12, 2010; 16 years ago
- Fate: Merged into AQ Interactive
- Headquarters: Tokyo, Japan
- Key people: Chikara Uchino (President & COO), Yoko Taro
- Products: Drakengard, Nier
- Parent: AQ Interactive
- Website: cavia.com (archived)

Cavia Inc. (Japanese: 株式会社キャビア, Hepburn: Kabushiki gaisha Kyabia) was a Japanese video game developer. It is best known for the Drakengard series, the first title in the Nier series (a spin-off of the former), and three Resident Evil light-gun shooters: Dead Aim, The Umbrella Chronicles and The Darkside Chronicles.

The company name was apparently an acronym for "Computer Amusement Visualizer", although the company's web site also claimed it referred to caviar.

== History ==
Cavia was founded on March 1, 2000, and headquartered in Tokyo. Its shareholders included Amuse Capital, Tokuma Shoten, Tohokushinsha Film Corporation, Nippon Television Network Corporation, Tokyo FM Broadcasting, Mitsubishi Corporation, and Hayao Nakayama, who served as president. Cavia was initially tasked with publishing games based on Japanese animation licenses on Sony, Sega, and Nintendo platforms.

Yoko Taro joined the company in 2001. In December 2002, Cavia absorbed Crazy Games (formerly Climax Graphics) after its closure. Taro served as director of Drag-On Dragoon in 2003, the company's first major original IP. It was conceived as a combination of gameplay elements from the Ace Combat and Dynasty Warriors franchises. The game was released in the West the following year as Drakengard. The studio collaborated with Production I.G to develop a Ghost in the Shell: Stand Alone Complex video game in 2004. By May 2004, Cavia employed more than 80 people. The company initially invested heavily on development for Xbox 360.

In October 2005, the company merged with Artoon and Feelplus, reorganizing itself into AQ Interactive, a holding company responsible for the management of the other studios. The old company's game planning & development business was transferred to a newly established Cavia Inc. In July 2006, the company released Bullet Witch for Xbox 360 in Japan. AQI signed a deal with Atari to publish the game Internationally. The game was released in the US in February 2007. Downloadable content was released by Cavia a month later.

While Artoon developed Blue Dragon and Feelplus made Lost Odyssey, Cavia partnered with Mistwalker to develop Cry On for the Xbox 360. Mistwalker president Hironobu Sakaguchi served as producer, Kimihiko Fujisaka served as character designer, and Nobuo Uematsu worked on the soundtrack. However, the title was ultimately cancelled at the end of 2008.

In 2009, Naoto Ohshima moved over from Artoon to take over as CEO of Cavia. In May, Square Enix officially announced Nier, developed by Cavia. Taro initially developed the game to be the third entry in the Drakengard series before it was turned into a spinoff. The game was released in May 2010, but was ultimately the studio's last game as Cavia was absorbed into AQ Interactive in July About a year later, AQI merged with Marvelous. Despite the closure, some members of the development staff from Nier, including Taro, went on to produce a prequel to the Drakengard series, Drakengard 3, under Access Games and published by Square Enix.

== Games ==
Year	Title	Platform
2002	Dramatic Soccer Game: Nihon Daihyo-senshu Ni Narou!	PlayStation 2
2002	One Piece: Nanatsu Shima no Daihihō	Game Boy Advance
2003	Resident Evil: Dead Aim	PlayStation 2
2003	Drakengard	PlayStation 2
2003	Takahashi Naoko no Marathon Shiyouyo!	PlayStation 2
2003	Kamen Rider Seigi no Keifu	PlayStation 2
2004	Soccer Life!	PlayStation 2
2004	Ghost in the Shell: Stand Alone Complex	PlayStation 2
2004	Dragon Ball Z: Supersonic Warriors	Game Boy Advance
2005	Steamboy	PlayStation 2
2005	Soccer Life 2	PlayStation 2
2005	Drakengard 2	PlayStation 2
2005	Naruto: Uzumaki Chronicles	PlayStation 2
2005	Beat Down: Fists of Vengeance	PlayStation 2, Xbox
2005	Dragon Ball Z: Supersonic Warriors 2	Nintendo DS
2005	Tetris: The Grand Master Ace	Xbox 360
2006	Tsuushin Taisen Majyan: Toryumon	Xbox 360
2006	Zitsuroku Oniyomenikki: Shiuchi Ni Taeru Otto No Rifuzintaiken Adventure	PlayStation Portable
2006	Dragon Quest: Shōnen Yangus to Fushigi no Dungeon	PlayStation 2
2006	WinBack 2: Project Poseidon	PlayStation 2, Xbox
2006	Lovely Complex: Punch de Conte	PlayStation 2
2006	Bullet Witch	Xbox 360
2006	Zegapain XOR	Xbox 360
2006	Naruto: Uzumaki Chronicles 2	PlayStation 2
2006	Zegapain NOT	Xbox 360
2006	Death Note: Kira Game	Nintendo DS
2007	Victorious Boxers: Revolution	Wii
2007	Fate/Tiger Colosseum	PlayStation Portable
2007	Resident Evil: The Umbrella Chronicles	Wii
2008	Fate/unlimited codes	Arcade, PlayStation 2, PlayStation Portable
2008	Sega Bass Fishing	Wii
2008	KORG DS-10	Nintendo DS
2009	Suzumiya Haruhi no Heiretsu	Wii
2009	Suzumiya Haruhi no Chokuretsu	Nintendo DS
2009	KORG DS-10 plus	Nintendo DS, Nintendo DSi
2009	Resident Evil: The Darkside Chronicles	Wii
2010	Nier Gestalt	PlayStation 3, Xbox 360
2010	Nier	PlayStation 3
Cancelled	Cry On	Xbox 360
Cancelled	Catacombs	PlayStation 3, Xbox 360
