= Drakengard 2 =

Action role-playing video game

- North American box art
- Developer: Cavia
- Publishers: JP: Square Enix; WW: Ubisoft
- Director: Akira Yasui
- Producer: Takamasa Shiba
- Artists: Kimihiko Fujisaka; Taro Hasegawa
- Writers: Sawako Natori; Fuminori Ishikawa
- Composers: Ryoki Matsumoto; Aoi Yoshiki
- Series: Drakengard
- Platform: PlayStation 2
- Release: JP: June 16, 2005; NA: February 14, 2006; EU: March 3, 2006; AU: March 9, 2006
- Genres: Action role-playing, hack and slash
- Mode: Single-player

Drakengard 2, known in Japan as Drag-On Dragoon 2: Sealed Red, Immoral Black, (Note: Japanese: ドラッグ オン ドラグーン2 封印の紅、背徳の黒, Hepburn: Doraggu On Doragūn Tsū: Fūin no Kurenai, Haitoku no Kuro) is a 2005 action role-playing video game developed by Cavia and published by Square Enix in Japan and Ubisoft in all other territories for the PlayStation 2. It is the second entry in the Drakengard series, set after the events of the original Drakengard. The story revolves around Nowe, a boy raised by the dragon Legna, fighting against a tyrannical faction of knights and encountering characters from the previous game and becoming entangled in the fate of the world.

Like the original, Drakengard 2 combines on-foot hack and slash with aerial combat stages and role-playing mechanics. The previous game's producer, writer and character designer returned to their respective roles. The game was designed as a more mainstream game in light of the previous game's dark aesthetic and story. The game sold 206,000 copies by the end of 2005. Western reviews praised the story, but gave mixed opinions about the graphics and widely criticized the gameplay. A spin-off from the series, Nier, was released in 2010, while a third entry in the series, Drakengard 3, was released in December 2013 in Japan and May 2014 in North America and Europe.

== Gameplay ==
The on-foot and aerial combat, showing characters Nowe and Legna

As with the original Drakengard, the game is split into chapters and subdivided into ground-based and airborne missions. The story of the game dictates which missions come when during the initial playthrough and how they play out, though as the player progresses, new remixed versions of the various playable levels called "free missions" are unlocked, which allow the player to go through the missions with the story elements removed. The player can jump between the game world's self-contained areas via a world map unlocked after the first chapter. In between the various chapters and missions, the player builds up their characters using experience points earned in battle: the characters' weapons and abilities, and the abilities of the player's dragon, can be gradually improved. The player's view of the world is through a fixed camera, which tracks the player's progress across the player area. Collectables in the form of weapons and items such as armor and health points and items needed to progress within the level are also available for the player to seek out. The game features Easy/Normal, Hard, and Extreme difficulty levels, and there are multiple weapons and items to collect throughout the levels.

Combat in the game is similar to its predecessor, with the main series of missions beginning after an opening tutorial. The game features ground-based hack-and-slash gameplay and aerial combat. In ground combat, the player controls multiple characters, switching between them via the pause menu in order to use their different weapons. The characters use physical attacks using character weapons for short-range battle, while magical attacks are used for long-range attacks and groups of enemies. The magical attacks vary between the playable characters. Weapons, characters and magical abilities leave up and grow stronger as the player gains experience points in combat: weapons have a four-level cap.

Aerial gameplay puts the main character atop his dragon, which is guided round by the player to attack enemy formations and large structures on the ground or enemies and airships in the sky. The player can also jump between the dragon and the ground during ground-based missions. The dragon has the ability to launch two types of fireballs: a homing variety that deals damage to single enemies, and a widespread attack which does higher damage to groups. Alongside this, the dragon can perform a special attack called "Dragon Overdrive", which kills many normal enemy units outright and deals high damage to stronger units and bosses. The dragon also gains experience and levels up through combat, dealing more damage in its attacks as it grows stronger. It also evolves and grows stronger at points directly linked to the game's narrative.

== Story ==
=== Setting and characters ===
Drakengard 2 takes place in an unnamed land nearly two decades after the events of Drakengard: originally said to take place after the game's first ending, it was later retconned so it took place in an isolated timeline following events similar to Drakengard. In the original game, two powers, the Empire and the Union, were engaged in a religious war over the Seals, magical bindings tied to a chosen Goddess of the Seal that kept dark entities known as the Watchers from appearing in the mortal world and destroying humanity. Caught up in the conflict were Caim and Angelus, a human and a dragon who had made a pact (a magical ritual that linked their souls), and fought to try to keep both the Seals and the Goddess safe. Though they ultimately failed, Angelus became the new seal, averting the end of the world. Eighteen years later, the Seals are protected by the Knights of the Seal, who eventually grow to become a dominating force in the land.

The game's main character is Nowe (ノウェ), a Knight of the Seal who possesses superhuman powers. Nowe's companion is Legna (レグナ, Reguna), a dragon who helped raise Nowe and was involved in the events of 18 years before. Accompanying Nowe on his journey is Manah (マナ, Mana), the main antagonist of the first game who now seeks to free the people from the oppression of the Knights; Eris (エリス, Erisu), a female Knight of the Seal and Nowe's childhood friend; and Urick (ユーリック, Yūrikku) a former Knight who made a pact with the Grim Reaper in exchange for his mortality. The main villain of the game is Gismor (ジスモア, Jisumoa), leader of the Knights of the Seal. Returning from the first game are Caim (カイム, Kaimu), the previous game's main protagonist; Angelus (アンヘル, Anheru), the current Goddess of the Seal; and Seere (セエレ, Sēre), once a companion to Caim and now the Hierarch of the Union. Minor characters include the guardians of the Seals, Zhangpo (ザンポ, Zanpo), Hanch (ハンチ, Hanchi) and Yaha (ヤハ), and Oror (オロー, Orō), who helped raise Nowe.

=== Plot ===
The game begins with Nowe becoming a fully-fledged Knight of the Seal. During his first mission, Nowe begins to doubt the ethics of the Knights' methods, as the seals require human sacrifices to remain strong. During a second mission to ensure the protection of the seal in the District of Soul Flame, Nowe encounters Manah, who kills the guardian Zhangpo and destroys the seal. Manah is sentenced to be burnt at the stake, but uses her magic to escape. After returning from the mission, Nowe is poisoned by Gismor, who reveals that he killed Nowe's adoptive father Oror. Surviving and escaping with Legna, Nowe is pursued by the Knights, including Eris, who wishes to persuade him to return. Nowe and Legna eventually rejoin Manah and join her on her quest to destroy the seals and, in her mind, free the people from the Knights' oppression.

On their way to the second seal, Manah shows Nowe the true horror of the Knights' deeds, fully winning him over. The two then fight and kill Lieutenant Hanch, destroying the seal in the District of Hallowed Water. After this, they are joined by Urick, a former Lieutenant of the Knights, to rout a group of bandits. Attacked by the Knights, they are unexpectedly saved by Caim, who is also working to destroy the seals and free his dragon Angelus from the pain of being the Goddess Seal.

After taking down Lieutenant Yaha and destroying the seal in the District of Precious Light, Manah is captured by the Knights and sentenced to death. Nowe manages to rescue her and heads for the seal in the District of Shining Life, which was once guarded by Urick before he fled in fear when Caim attacked the district. Urick and Nowe face off against Caim, who mortally wounds Urick before being driven off. Urick dies content and the seal is destroyed.

Nowe and Manah head for the final seal in the District of Heavenly Time, guarded by Gismor himself. Nowe and Gismor battle, and Gismor is wounded again, transforming into a shadow-like being and using Eris to block Nowe's final attack. Believing Eris dead, Nowe and Manah pursue Gismor, but are met by Seere, who unsuccessfully tries to stop them. When they confront Gismor, he reveals himself to be a vindictive survivor of the Empire from eighteen years before. Defeated, Gismor destroys the final seal himself, releasing Angelus from her imprisonment. After Seere reveals the true consequences of Manah's actions, Nowe and Legna pursue Angelus. When they find her, they find that Angelus has been driven mad by the pain of being the final seal. Caim asks them to kill her, and as she dies, he and Angelus share a final moment together before fading away.

With the seals destroyed, the world begins to fall into chaos and Manah is driven mad by the memories of her actions eighteen years before. Legna then takes Nowe to the floating fortress of the Holy Dragons, where they hear a prophecy concerning Nowe: according to the prophecy, Nowe is a New Breed created to aid the dragons in their war against the Watchers. Nowe reunites with Eris, who has been healed by Seere, and frees Manah from her madness. Legna then takes the three to the Promised Land, a dragon stronghold that holds the Bone Casket, an object given to the dragons by, and imbued with the power of, the Watchers, that can speed up Nowe's evolution into the New Breed. It is also where Seere has gone to initiate a new Goddess of the Seal. The game has three endings, each achieved on a separate playthrough.

- Ending A: The group arrive in the Promised Land and Legna prepares to enact the prophecy, but Nowe instead chooses to find a new Goddess. Legna calls the Holy Dragons to battle, but Seere leads an army of Golems against them. With everything seeming lost, Manah and Nowe share a final kiss, which triggers Nowe's transformation into the New Breed. Nowe and Legna do battle, and Legna is killed. Eris then reveals that she is to become the new Goddess. Eris is initiated, and although the world is restored, Nowe and Manah feel sad that no other solution could be found.
- Ending B: When they arrive, Legna reveals Eris' fate to become the new Goddess, and Nowe chooses to follow Legna's plan. But upon trying to enter the Casket, it rejects him and fuses with Manah. Legna and Nowe battle Manah, who sacrifices herself to destroy the Bone Casket's power. Nowe, Legna and Eris then lead the Holy Dragons in their war against the Watchers.
- Ending C: Events proceed as in Ending B, but when the Casket attacks Manah, she manages to overpower and absorb it. Legna summons the Holy Dragons and events proceed as in Ending A. After Legna's defeat and the destruction of the Bone Casket, both the Watchers and the dragons fade, leaving the world safe and humans free to create a new future for themselves.

== Development ==
Drakengard 2 was announced in December 2004. Producer Takamasa Shiba and character designer Kimihiko Fujisaka returned to the team, alongside actor Shinnosuke Ikehata, who voiced the dragon Angelus and its partner Caim in the previous game. The original director, Yoko Taro, originally proposed a space adventure involving dragons, but this was vetoed at an early stage. Yoko was not involved in creating the narrative as he had been in Drakengard, being mostly tied up with another project, though he was able to observe the project's progress. He and Drakengard 2's director Akira Yasui suffered from creative differences, with the result that Yoko termed their relationship on the project as a "love-hate" story in a 2013 interview concerning the series. Their relationship inspired one of the stories created for an in-game weapon. Yoko was eventually brought on fairly late in the game's production to act as video editor for the CGI cutscenes and trailers. The CGI cutscenes were created by Studio Anima. The game's cast featured multiple film and television actors, including Ryo Katsuji, Saki Aibu, Koyuki and veteran actor Yoshio Harada. Shiba commented at the time that he felt they had gathered a very good voice cast for the game.

One of the decisions Yasui made was to make Drakengard 2 far more colorful than the previous game, wanting to do something that was the "opposite" of Drakengard. In contrast to the previous game, the game contained far less of the mature themes found in the original. Shiba, speaking in a 2013 interview, said that the reason for this was that Square Enix, the company's Japanese publisher, wanted that aspect toned down to make a more mainstream game. It was designed to keep some dark aesthetics from its predecessor, with the previous game's theme of immorality as one of the key character and narrative themes, as well as themes of war and death. Other themes explored were love and hate, and the ambivalence represented in the world's prevalent factions (the Knights of the Seal, and the Cult of Watchers). Highlighted aspects of the story were the father-son relationship between Nowe and Legna, and how Manah had matured since the events of Drakengard. To promote the game in Japan, Fujisaka created a light-toned joke advertisement under the name Angelegna, referring to the original names of the two dragon characters. While Square Enix published the title in Japan, they entered an agreement with developer and publishing company Ubisoft to publish the title overseas. Ubisoft also handled the game's localization.

=== Character design ===
One of the main concepts for main protagonist Nowe was surpassing one's father. For the fight between Nowe and Legna, special gameplay functions and mechanics needed to be created for Nowe. Shiba had mixed feelings about the final fight between Legna and Nowe, which he saw as a drastic change from both the first game and the series mechanic of the protagonist riding a dragon. Shiba ended up writing their dialogue to emphasize their relationship and the difficulty of them fighting each other, paralleling earlier scenes between Caim and Angelus. The deaths of Caim and Angelus was intended to be "short and ruthless", but Yasui had it changed to the more sentimental version present in the game. Dialogue from Caim for the scene was cut from the game due to it clashing with his previous portrayal as a mute. Urick was created to be the supportive "big brother" of the party.

Although the main characters were designed by Fujisaka, the character Legna, previously known as the "Black Dragon", was designed by Taro Hasegawa, who was also monster designer for both Drakengard and Drakengard 2. In addition to designing the characters, Fujisaka drew the character portraits used for character dialogue boxes during in-game cutscenes, a feature he initially objected to. Nowe, in contrast to the other protagonists of the Drakengard series, was designed around the concept of a stereotypical hero. Nowe was one of Fujisaka's favorite characters to design, although Shiba was less enthusiastic. Manah's redesign in Drakengard 2 reflected both her evolved personality and her more traditional depiction as a fantasy heroine. Elements of their designs were taken from Caim and Furiae, representing "passing the torch" between characters. Because of Legna's different roles in Drakengard and Drakengard 2, his design and movements were altered for his second incarnation. Eris's design was inspired by Casca, a character from Berserk: while he tried not to copy any parts of Casca's design, Fujisaka tried to convey it using aspects of her personality. He also tried to balance this part of her depiction with a tender and more feminine side. Another idea he had in mind was the image of an honors student. Her dance-like fighting style was generally suggested by the game's staff. Caim's redesign was meant to represent his status as a wanderer.

=== Music ===
Drakengard 2's soundtrack was composed by Ryoki Matsumoto and Aoi Yoshiki, with supervision by Nobuyoshi Sano, who worked on the music of Drakengard and acted as Sound Director for the game. The CGI cutscenes were scored by Masashi Yano. Due to criticism of his work on the first game, Sano was asked by Shiba to bring in outside help for the second game's soundtrack: Matsumoto was brought in because of his work on the songs "Yuki no Hana" and "Tsuki no Shizuku", and, Yoshiki was brought on at Matsumoto's request. The soundtrack was designed to be a fusion of J-pop and conventional video game music, and to evoke the emotions of the various characters and the feeling of battle. The game's theme song in Japan, "Hitori", was sung by Mika Nakashima, who also worked as a sound producer. The theme song for the game's English release was "Growing Wings", a localized version of the first game's theme song sung by Kari Wahlgren.

== Reception ==
Reception

Aggregate score
Aggregator	Score
Metacritic	58/100

Review scores
Publication	Score
1Up.com	D+
Eurogamer	6/10
Famitsu	30/40
GameSpot	7/10
GameTrailers	6.2/10
IGN	6.3/10
VideoGamer.com	5/10

Drakengard 2 sold well in Japan. The game was considered a hit in Japan by Ubisoft, selling 100,000 units in its first week, and reaching sales of 170,000 units by the end of the month, becoming the second best-selling game of June behind Sega's GBA port of Mushiking: King of the Beetles. It eventually sold just over 206,000 copies by the end of 2005. The game was eventually re-released as part of Square Enix's Ultimate Hits series, re-releases of high-selling titles. Drakengard 2 received a score of 30/40 from Japanese gaming magazine Famitsu. The game received "average" reviews, according to video game review aggregator Metacritic.

The story received mixed to positive reviews. IGN's Ed Lewis said it "admirably [continued] the bizarre and fantastically medieval world that was established in the original game.", while GameSpot's Greg Meuller called it "Interesting [...] with plenty of twists and turns". Eurogamer's Simon Parkin cited the story as being very good, though he found Nowe "a little nauseating to watch as the weighty, dark (and pretty good) plot unfolds", and VideoGamer.coms Adam Jarvis called the story "one of the highlights of the package". The 1Up.com reviewer called the "clear undercurrent of "maybe the good guys are the bad guys,"" one of the main reasons to keep playing the game. In contrast, the reviewer for GameTrailers called it "a cookie-cutter RPG plot" where players could "predict nearly every plot twist the game throws at [them].",

The graphics received mixed reviews. Lewis called them "more interesting than the first game, but marginally so", and Meuller called them "dated", with environments seeming "bland and drab, and the enemies [looking] generic". The GameTrailers reviewer praised the character animations, but cited the environments as bland and felt that there were too few FMVs and too many game engine-driven cutscenes, which he described as "awful". Parkin criticized the game's graphic capacities, commenting that players would "stop watching the main screen instead fixing upon the little map in the corner to guide your character towards hostile red dots that only materialize polygonal just seconds before you lock swords.", while Jarvis said that it had not improved from the previous game and called the colors "very murky, drab and dark". 1UP.com said that the graphics "[don't] hold up to the visual quality of Cavia's other titles like Ghost in the Shell: Stand Alone Complex [or] Naruto: Uzumaki Ninden".

The gameplay was universally criticized. Parkin called the battle gameplay "lightweight" and the balance between ground and aerial combat poor despite a good character leveling system, while Lewis described it as being without strategy, with the game "just dumping in more boring enemies to wade through". GameTrailers said that there was "nothing new here.", while Meuller called it "dull at best and frustrating at worst". 1UP.com said that the combat was "almost sickening to look at.", though he cited the RPG elements as a redeeming feature. Jarvis simply called the gameplay "Same old, same old", citing it as a major fault of the game.

== Legacy ==
In September 2013, the game was given an honorable mention among Kotaku's Tim Rogers as one of the best games on the PS2. Rogers gave praise to the game's parry mechanic and atmosphere. In the year of its release in Japan, the game received a novelization written by Emi Nagashima under her pen name of Jun Eishima. Yoko and Shiba teamed up again to create another game in the series, but that eventually developed into Nier, a spin-off from the first game's fifth ending. After Nier's release, Cavia was absorbed into AQ Interactive, then Yoko left to become a freelance. An attempt by Shiba to begin development of a third Drakengard game at AQ Interactive were unsuccessful. Drakengard 3 was eventually unveiled in 2013, with Shiba, Yoko and Fujisaka returning to their former roles and the story being set before the original game. Both Shiba and Yoko have voiced their willingness to continue the series on next-generation consoles if there were sufficient sales and funds, while Yoko also expressed interest in making a second spin-off, although he did not specify whether it would be set in the world of Nier or not.
