= Yoko Taro =

Japanese video game director

- 横尾 太郎
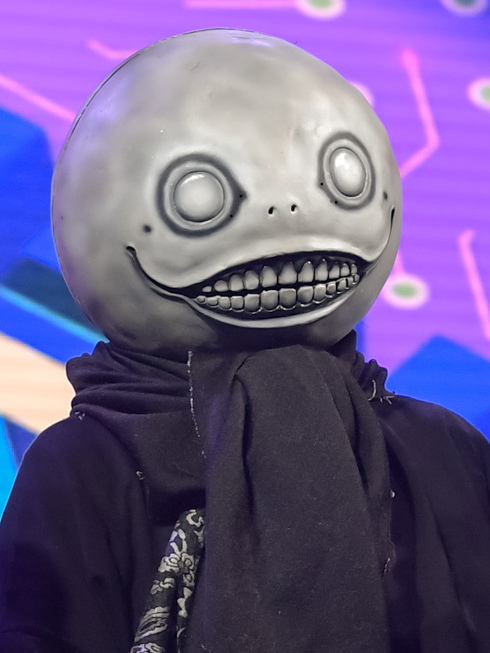
- Yoko wearing his mask in 2018
- Born: June 6, 1970 (age 56); Nagoya, Aichi, Japan
- Education: Kobe Design University
- Occupations: Video game director, writer
- Years active: 1994–present
- Notable work: Drakengard; Nier
- Title: President and CEO of Bukkoro
- Spouse: Yoko Yukiko
- Website: bukkoro.com

Yoko Taro (横尾 太郎, Yokoo Tarō; born June 6, 1970) is a Japanese director and scenario writer for video games. Starting his career at the now defunct game developer Cavia, his best-known work is on the action role-playing video game series Drakengard, and its spin-offs, Nier and Nier: Automata. Yoko was born in Nagoya, Aichi, and studied at the Kobe Design University in the 1990s. While he did not initially intend to pursue a career in video games, after working at Namco and Sony, he joined Cavia and became the director and scenario writer for the first Drakengard game. He has since worked extensively on every game in the series (except Drakengard 2), and on mobile titles after becoming a freelancer following Cavia's absorption into AQ Interactive. Furthermore, Yoko Taro has been assigned as the writer of the upcoming Neon Genesis Evangelion series teased in 2026.

Critics have noted Yoko's unconventional game design and writing style. One of the main aspects of his work is exploring the darker aspects of humanity, such as why they are motivated to kill each other, although he typically does not share a common opinion on his story's dark natures. His writing technique, described as "backwards scriptwriting", involves outlining the ending of the story first and building the narrative backward from that point. Due to his disdain for being photographed, he generally wears a mask when giving interviews or presenting games.

== Early life and education ==
Yoko Taro was born in Nagoya, Aichi, on June 6, 1970. Taro's parents were often absent from home due to their jobs, so he was mostly raised by his grandmother, who left a strong impression on him. During his youth, he heard about an incident that would influence his later work as a scenario writer: while an acquaintance was in a shopping street with a group of friends, one of them who was walking along a high building roof slipped and died from the fall. The scene as Yoko heard it was initially "horrifying", but included a humorous element as well. He studied at Kobe Design University and graduated in March 1994. He is married to Yukiko Yoko, an illustrator who worked on Taiko no Tatsujin series and also did work on Drakengard 3.

== Career ==
Initially not intending to pursue a career in video games, his first job a month after graduating was as a 3D CGI designer for Namco. In 1999, he joined Sugar & Rockets Inc., a now-defunct in-house developer owned by Sony Computer Entertainment. In 2001, a year after Sugar & Rockets' consolidation by Sony, Yoko got a job at Cavia. While working at Cavia, he became involved in the creation of Drakengard. While the game's co-producer Takuya Iwasaki intended to take the director's role, he was busy with other projects, so Yoko was asked to take up director's duties. He also helped create the scenario and characters, as well as co-writing the script with Sawako Natori. During its production, Yoko was unhappy with the amount of changes asked for by the game's advisory board. It got to the point where he decided he would not work on another Drakengard. He was later involved in the production of Drakengard 2, being credited as a video editor while also remaining as one of the game's creative staff. Mostly tied up with another project during production, his original concept for the game as an arcade-style game with dragons in space was vetoed and he had creative clashes with the game's new director Akira Yasui.

After Drakengard 2 was completed, Yoko started work on a third entry in the series. As the game developed, the initial concept was developed to the point where the game was rebranded as Nier, a spin-off from the series. Despite this, Yoko continued to consider it the third entry in the series. After Nier was released and Cavia was absorbed into AQ Interactive, Yoko left the company and pursued an independent career. During this period, he took an unknown role in the development of Square Enix's social game Monster × Dragon. The majority of his freelancer work involved social mobile games. Many years later, Yoko teamed back up with multiple staff from the production of Drakengard and Nier to create a true second sequel to Drakengard, determining through questionnaires that the main appeal to the fanbase was the dark stories. After the completion of Drakengard 3, Yoko "went back into unemployment". After that, he began writing a short-term special column for Famitsu titled "Taro Yoko's Circle of No Good Thinking". In 2015, Yoko announced that he had started his own company called Bukkoro, staffed by Yoko, his wife Yukiko, and Hana Kikuchi, novelist and scenario writer for Nier and Drakengard 3. His other works include the 2023 anime television series based on Nier: Automata titled Nier: Automata Ver1.1a, co-writing the script with the anime's director Ryouji Masuyama.

Yoko has stated his intense dislike of interviews. His reason, according to his Famitsu column, was that he feels video game developers are not entertainers or commentators on their work and that he thinks the subjects they talk about in interviews would be overly boring to those reading or listening. When he does give interviews, he prefers to wear a mask to avoid being photographed, and in a video interview concerning Drakengard 3, he used a glove puppet. He has also stated that he likes to be blunt when stating his opinions, as he feels that video game fans deserve truth and honesty.

=== Writing ===
Yoko is noted for creating games with a dark, disturbing or unusual atmosphere. This was stated as the main reason he was brought in to work on Monster × Dragon. His writing method, which he has not seen in other works of fiction, is called "backwards scriptwriting". He described it as starting with the ending first, then working backwards from there. He then creates central plot points that form emotional peaks in the narrative, adds details, then scatters them through the narrative so the player can build a suitable emotional connection. He uses a secondary method called "photo thinking" in conjunction with his scriptwriting method. Yoko describes it as a method of visualizing and keeping in order events and emotional peaks throughout the story. He cited his inspiration for this method as The Memory Palace of Matteo Ricci by Jonathan Spence. He is keen in experimenting with the video game format, feeling that many conventions of the video game market inhibit developers' creative freedom. Many of his games reflect his own feelings about death and his socratic questioning of the concept. Yoko also considers food an important tool in creating a game, stating that he thinks that types of food from across the world can help him get a feel for the people the game is being aimed at.

Yoko was influenced in his style for the Drakengard series by many games of the day: a commonality he noted was that the player got gradings for their performance after killing dozens or hundreds of enemy units in a "gloating" manner. Because the concept of enjoying killing seemed insane to him, he designed the first game's main protagonists to be insane. He also wished to explore what drove people to kill each other. Later, for Nier and Drakengard 3, Yoko explored the idea of a terrible event where both sides believed they were doing the right thing. For Nier, he took direct inspiration from the September 11 attacks and the war on terror. Another direct influence on Nier was of the gameplay of the God of War series, which both he and the game's producer Yosuke Saito admired. He has stated his dislike for the "plain and forgettable" type of female video game character: he demonstrated his dislike for this and the stereotypical role-playing video game romance in Furiae, an important character in Drakengard. Another character he has been greatly involved in creating is Zero, Drakengard 3's protagonist: while creating her, he felt it would be interesting to create a character who was formerly a prostitute as it was a character type that was fairly rare in video games. In general, Yoko does not consider his writing to be as dark as others see it, while admitting that he deliberately incorporates dark elements. A notable influence on the gameplay of his titles was the classic shoot 'em up Ikaruga; it directly inspired the dragon flight sequences of Drakengard and bullet hell sections in Nier; and informed Yoko on the synchronization of gameplay with the music. A biography of him drawn Keiji Yoshida and based on Yoko Taro's own words was released in the Game Creators of Biography web manga series, under the title "ヨコオタロウ編" ("Yokoo Tarō-hen"). It was published by Cygames on its Cycomi platform, starting from February 21, 2021.

== Works ==
=== Video games ===
Year	Title	Role
1996	Alpine Racer 2	Background designer
1998	Time Crisis II	Background designer
2000	Chase the Express	Planner
2001	Phase Paradox	Game designer, visual design
2003	Drakengard	Director, scenario writer
2005	Drakengard 2	Video editor
2010	Nier	Director, scenario writer
2011	Monster × Dragon	Scenario supervisor
2012	Demons' Score	Support planner
2013	Drakengard 3	Creative director, scenario writer
2017	Nier: Automata	Director, scenario writer
2017	SINoALICE	Creative director
2019	Final Fantasy XIV: Shadowbringers	YoRHa: Dark Apocalypse scenario writer
2021	Nier Reincarnation	Creative director, scenario writer
2021	Nier Replicant ver.1.22474487139...	Creative director, scenario writer
2021	Voice of Cards: The Isle Dragon Roars	Creative director, scenario writer
2022	Voice of Cards: The Forsaken Maiden	Creative director, scenario writer
2022	Voice of Cards: The Beasts of Burden	Creative director, scenario writer
2023	404 GAME RE:SET	Creative director, scenario writer
2023	Final Fantasy XVI	Special Thanks

=== Books and manga ===
Year	Title	Role
2013	Drag-on Dragoon: Utahime Five	Supervisor
2013	Drag-on Dragoon: Shi ni Itaru Aka	Supervisor
2014	Drag-on Dragoon 3: Story Side	Supervisor
2014	Thou Shalt Not Die	Creator, writer
2017	NieR:Automata: Short Story Long	Writer
2018	NieR:Automata - YoRHa Boys	Supervisor
2020	YoRHa: Pearl Harbor Descent record – A NieR:Automata Story	Writer
2021	Nier Replicant Ver 1.22474487139… Project Gestalt Recollections –File01	Writer
2021	Nier Replicant Ver 1.22474487139… Project Gestalt Recollections –File02	Writer
2021	Game Creators of Biography (Yoko Taro-hen)	Writer, himself

=== Television ===
Year	Title	Role
2023	Nier: Automata Ver1.1a	Creator, writer
2023	KamiErabi God.app	Creator, planner
TBA	Untitled Neon Genesis Evangelion series	Writer

=== Stage plays ===
Year	Title	Role
2014	YoRHa Stage Play, Ver. 1.0	Creator, writer
2015	YoRHa Stage Play, Ver. 1.1	Writer
2016	Thou Shalt Not Die Zero	Creator
2018	YoRHa Musical Ver. 1.2	Writer
2018	YoRHa Boys Ver. 1.0	Writer
2019	Thou Shalt Not Die Zero_KAI	Writer
2019	YoRHa Ver. 1.3a	Writer
2020	YoRHa Ver. 1.3aa	Writer
2020	YoRHa Girls Ver. 1.1a	Writer
2021	Bakuken	Writer

=== Music videos ===
Year	Title	Artist	Role	Notes
2023	"Antinomy YOKO TARO Edition"	Amazarashi	Writer	Ending theme of Nier: Automata Ver1.1a
