= Peter (actor) =

Japanese singer, dancer and actor (born 1952)

- Born: Shinnosuke Ikehata; August 8, 1952 (age 74); Sōemonchō, Osaka, Japan
- Occupations: Singer, actor
- Years active: 1969 - 2018, 2020 -
- Agent: First Agent
- Notable work: Funeral Parade of Roses, Ran
- Height: 166 cm (5 ft 5 in)
- Father: Yuki Yoshimura (ja)

Shinnosuke Ikehata (池畑慎之助, Ikehata Shinnosuke), professionally known as Peter, is a Japanese actor and singer.

Known for cross-dressing, Peter was assigned male at birth but identifies as non-binary and is gay.

Peter was born in Sōemonchō, Chuo Ward, Osaka, Japan, as the eldest son to their father Yuki Yoshimura (ja), who was the fourth generation Iemoto (family head) of the Yoshimura school (Yoshimura-ryu: ja) of Kamigatamai dance (ja). Peter, as a succession to the family specialty, made their debut on the stage at age 3, having been trained rigorously by their father. Peter also has one older sister, Toyoko Ishikawa. At the age of 5, their parents divorced, and Peter was told to choose which parent they liked better, and since their father “was terrifying like an ogre during his dance practice", they chose to live with their mother, Kiyoko Ikehata. In their second year of elementary school, they moved to live with their grandparents in the Kagoshima Prefecture, and lived out their childhood days there. Their mother ran a ryoutei in Tenmonkan (ja), (a shopping district in downtown Kagoshima named 'Yodogawa (淀川)'. From this point onwards, Peter has used their mother’s surname, ‘Ikehata (池畑)’ instead of their father's paternal surname, ‘Hashimoto (橋本)’.

They went to school at Shimizu Elementary School {ja), Kagoshima City, and then onto Japanese La Salle Academy. They studied desperately hard to make their mother happy. However, due to being unable to handle dorm life, they transferred to Jōsei Junior High School (ja), Kagoshima City. In their third year of junior high, they ran away from home, going to Tokyo via Osaka.

== Filmography and discography ==
=== Film ===
Year	Title	Role	Notes	Ref.
1969	Funeral Parade of Roses	Eddie		
1970	Zatoichi Goes to the Fire Festival			
1970	Three Pretty Devils	Singer		
1977	Gokumon-tō			
1978	Hi no Tori			
1979	The House of Hanging			
1981	Fruits of Passion	Madame		
1985	Ran	Kyoami		
1986	Guinea Pig 4: Devil Woman Doctor			
1986	Death Shadows	Sentaro		
2006	Death Note 2: The Last Name	Rem (voice)		
2017	Hanagatami	Old prostitute		
2026	Two Cigarettes, Three Nights	Narasaki		

=== Television ===
Year	Title	Role	Notes	Ref.
2001	Hojo Tokimune	Hōjō Sanetoki	Taiga drama	
2024	Omusubi	Himiko	Asadora	

=== Video games ===
- Drakengard (2003), Caim, Angel (credited separately as Shinnosuke Ikehata and Peter)
- Drakengard 2 (2005), Caim, Angel (credited as Peter and Shinnosuke Ikehata)
- Nier (2010), Grimoire Weiss (credited as Peter and Shinnosuke Ikehata, succeeded by Hiroki Yasumoto in 2021 remaster)
- Yakuza: Dead Souls (2011), DD
- Drakengard 3 (2013), Michael (credited as Peter)

Preceded by Ken Yabuki; Kaori Kumi; Pinky & Killers	Japan Record Award for Best New Artist; 1969	Succeeded by Akira Nishikino
