= Drakengard and Nier =

Video game series

Drakengard; Nier
- Logo used for the first Drakengard game
- Genre: Action role-playing
- Developers: Cavia; Macrospace; Access Games; PlatinumGames; Toylogic; Applibot
- Publishers: Square Enix; Gathering of Developers; Ubisoft
- Creators: Yoko Taro; Takamasa Shiba; Takuya Iwasaki
- Platforms: PlayStation 2, PlayStation 3, Xbox 360, PlayStation 4, Windows, Xbox One, Android, iOS, Nintendo Switch
- First release: Drakengard; September 11, 2003
- Latest release: Nier Replicant ver.1.22474487139... April 22, 2021

Drakengard, known in Japan as Drag-On Dragoon, (Note: Japanese: ドラッグ オン ドラグーン, Hepburn: Doraggu On Doragūn; commonly abbreviated as DOD) and its spin-off series, Nier, are action role-playing video games directed largely by Yoko Taro, with the exception of Drakengard 2, in which he only had minor involvement. The two series share a single branching timeline, though they take place in parallel universes: the dark fantasy world of Midgard and a post-apocalyptic Earth. The Drakengard series was originally developed by Cavia and published by Square Enix. The eponymous first game in the series was released in 2003 on the PlayStation 2, and has since been followed by a sequel, a prequel and several spin-offs. The Nier spin-offs, taking place in an alternative timeline set after a different ending to the first Drakengard than the one 2005's Drakengard 2 followed, was started in 2010 with the eponymous game.

The stories of both Drakengard and Nier generally focus on the fortunes and personalities of a small group of protagonists either directly or indirectly connected to and affected by the events of the story. Dark or mature plot and character themes and multiple endings have become a staple of the series. The setting of the Drakengard games is a Northern Europe-like dark fantasy world where humans and creatures from myth and legends live side by side, while the Nier games are set in the distant future of a different ending to the first Drakengard from the one Drakengard 2 follows. Both series have been largely praised for their complex characters and storylines, although the gameplay mechanics of the Drakengard games have been criticized.

Both Drakengard and the original Nier have long been considered popular in Japan, selling well and gaining a cult following, and resulting in multiple adaptations and additional media such as books (including several novelizations), manga, comics, and a stage play. They remained little-known outside Japan until the 2017 release of Nier: Automata, which was a worldwide commercial and critical success and led to an increase in interest from western countries, resulting in a remaster of the original Nier, subtitled Replicant ver.1.22474487139..., being released in 2021 to larger attention and substantially better sales than the original.

== Games ==
Release timeline
2003	Drakengard
2004
2005	Drakengard 2
2006–2009
2010	Nier
2011–2012
2013	Drakengard 3
2014–2016
2017	Nier: Automata
2018–2020
2021	Nier Reincarnation
2021	Nier Replicant ver.1.22474487139...

- Drakengard, the first installment in the franchise. It released for the PlayStation 2 (PS2) in September 2003 in Japan, March and May 2004 in North America and Europe respectively. Square Enix published the title in Japan and North America, while Gathering of Developers published it in European territories. A Europe-exclusive mobile port was released in August 2004. The mobile version was co-developed and co-published with Macrospace.
  - Drakengard 2, the second installment in the series and direct sequel to the first game. It released on the PS2 in June 2005 in Japan, February 2006 in North America and March of the same year in Europe and Australia. For its release in western territories, Square Enix partnered with European game developer and publisher Ubisoft. Ubisoft also handled the game's localization.
  - Drakengard 3, the third main installment in the series and a prequel to the first game. It released on the PS3 in December 2013 in Japan and May 2014 in North America and Europe. Like Nier, it was published in all regions by Square Enix.
- Nier, a spin-off from the main series stemming from the last of Drakengard's five possible endings. Nier was released on the PlayStation 3 (PS3) and Xbox 360 (as Nier Replicant in Japan for PS3 only, Nier Gestalt in Japan for Xbox 360, and Nier in North America and Europe) in April 2010 across all regions. It was published by Square Enix across all regions. An updated version titled Nier Replicant ver.1.22474487139… was released for PlayStation 4, Xbox One, and Microsoft Windows in April 2021.
  - Nier: Automata, a distant sequel to Nier, set in the same universe but thousands of years in the future. It was released for PlayStation 4 in February 2017, Microsoft Windows in March 2017, Xbox One in June 2018, and Nintendo Switch October 2022.
  - Nier Reincarnation, a mainline Nier title for mobile platforms, set in the Nier universe but taking place in a mysterious location known as the Cage. It was released for Android and iOS in February 2021. The game ended service in April 2024.

== Development ==
=== History ===
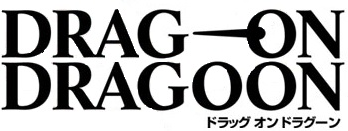
The original Japanese series logo

The idea for Drakengard originated in 1999 between Takamasa Shiba and Takuya Iwasaki. The gameplay was conceived as a blend of elements from Ace Combat and Dynasty Warriors 2. The team developing the game went under the moniker "Project Dragonsphere". The game was developed by Cavia and directed by Yoko Taro, who was the main drive behind the game's dark atmosphere. It was Shiba's first project as a producer. As Yoko was told there would not be a sequel, multiple endings were created. When it was localized and released in the west, references to things such as sexual taboos were censored. In addition, the title was changed, as Drag-On Dragoon was considered wrong for a western audience. Drakengard was considered enough of a success that a sequel was commissioned. Multiple staff members returned for the creation of the second game, although Yoko was mostly tied up with other projects and was replaced as director by Akira Yasui. Yoko still had a role in development, and he and Yasui had creative clashes during development. Yasui ended up making Drakengard 2 the thematic opposite of the previous game, employing a lighter tone and broader color palette.

Nier originated when Yoko and Shiba teamed up to create a third Drakengard game. As the project continued, it became more detached from the main continuity and eventually developed into an entirely new spin-off. Despite what it became, Yoko has stated that he considers Nier to be the true Drakengard 3. It was the last game developed by Cavia. After its release, Cavia closed down and was absorbed by AQ Interactive, then Yoko Taro left to pursue a wider range of projects. A stalled attempt to begin production of further games in the series at AQ Interactive was blamed by Shiba on a prevalent trend at the time for light-weight games for the general gaming community. Later, Yoko and Shiba came together again to create a proper second sequel to Drakengard, with the intention of creating a hard core RPG for the fanbase. Unlike the previous games in the series, Drakengard 3 was developed by Access Games, a developer whose noted games included Deadly Premonition, and brought in team members used to create action games. During the run-up to Drakengard 3's release, both Yoko and Shiba expressed their willingness to continue the series on the PlayStation 4 if the latest game was enough of a success. Speaking in 2014 after the game's release, Yoko stated that the series was on hold due to lack of funds. A new Nier game was revealed to be in development at Square Enix and PlatinumGames.

=== Writing and character design ===
The stories of the original game's characters were written by Yoko, Shiba and Iwasaki, while the main game script was written by Sawako Natori, who would go on to co-write the main scenarios for future Drakengard games. Yoko designed the darker elements to both contrast and actively compete with the likes of Dragon Quest and Final Fantasy. Yoko conceived the "insane" characters around the premise that people who killed hundreds of people in pursuit of their goals and took satisfaction from it were naturally insane. During the production of Nier, his focus changed to writing a story where everyone believed they were in the right whatever their actions. Through the series, Yoko has also been attempting to answer the question of why people are driven to kill. Although some of the dark narrative themes were kept for Drakengard 2, many of the other narrative elements were made more mainstream. Drakengard 3 was intended to return to a dark aesthetic, but also to include moments of humor and tie in with Nier.

The character designer for the Drakengard games is Kimihiko Fujisaka. Initially a minor staff member at Cavia, the team were impressed by his skill as an amateur artist and he was recommended for the post of character designer for the game. The designs for both the characters and the world were influenced by armor and clothing of Medieval Europe. He returned in the same capacity for Drakengard 2, and later for Nier. Disliking some of his initial designs for Drakengard, he took the opportunity to remodel them more to his liking for the arcade game Lord of Vermilion. In Drakengard 3, Fujisaka designed the protagonist Zero around the dark themes of the game, although some unusual elements were nearly cut. The other female characters were inspired by Puella Magi Madoka Magica, while the male characters, considered a low priority, were designed around male archetypes and approved quickly.

The character designs for Nier were handled by an artist under the moniker D.K. For Nier's international release, the protagonist was redesigned from a teenager to an adult character. This was because the publishers felt an older character would appeal more to western players. For Nier: Automata, the main character designs were handled by Akihiko Yoshida, an artist noted for his work on the Final Fantasy series. While he was initially expected to refuse, he agreed as several staff members at his company CyDesignation were fans of Nier. For his designs, Yoko requested he focus on smooth outlines and black coloring. Other characters were designed by Yuya Nagai and Toshiyuki Itahana.

=== Music ===
The first game's soundtrack was created by Nobuyoshi Sano and Takayuki Aihara. The two created the score using samples from well-known classical composers. The second game's soundtrack was composed by Ryoki Matsumoto and Aoi Yoshiki, who had never before been involved with video game soundtracks. The game's Japanese theme song, Hitori, was sung by Mika Nakashima. The music for Nier was composed by Keiichi Okabe, who composed the soundtrack as something different from the main series, and to directly reflect the sombre tone of the game's setting and story. Singer Emi Evans (Emiko Rebecca Evans) wrote and sang the vocal tracks, and performed many tracks in an invented language dubbed "Chaos Language". "Chaos Language" is less a language and more a writing style, as each individual song has a different language based on a real-world language. The one exception to this is "Song Of The Ancients" which is sung in a language based upon multiple different languages, instead of a single language. Okabe returned to compose the soundtrack for Drakengard 3: in an interview, he stated that, in composing the music, he tried to emulate the work of the earlier composer without imitating them. He also commented that the result was very unlike the traditional Square Enix game. The game features two theme songs: "Black Song", performed by Eir Aoi, and "This Silence is Mine", the game's theme song proper, written and sung by Chihiro Onitsuka. Okabe again provided the music for Nier: Automata, with singer Emi Evans also returning.

== Common elements ==
=== Setting ===
Midgard, the setting of the main Drakengard games, as it appears in Drakengard 3. The world has been described by Anime News Network as "a warped version of medieval Europe".

The Drakengard games take place in a dark fantasy version of Medieval Europe called Midgard. Humans appear to be the predominant species, although races such as dragons, fairies and elves are shown to exist. The setting, mythos, and landscape borrow extensively from the lore of Northern Europe. The world is overseen by a group of unnamed gods who have yet to make a personal appearance. (Note: In the Japanese version, the world is ruled by a single eponymous deity referred to as "God" (神, Kami), and are also referred to in the English version of Drakengard 2 as "the Nameless".) The gods are served by beings known as the Watchers, (Note: Watchers; Angels (天使, Tenshi) in the Japanese version and the English version of Drakengard 3; also referred to as "Grotesqueries" in Drakengard.) entities created to destroy humanity because they are considered a failure. The Watchers are kept from entering the world with the seals, which act to keep the world in balance: should the seals be destroyed, the Watchers would enter the world and destroy humanity. At the core of the seals is the Goddess of the Seal, a mortal virgin female chosen and branded with the final seal: if all the seals are destroyed, all that stands between the Watchers and the world is the death of the Goddess herself. A core element of the Drakengard universe is the ability for humans and beasts to form a Pact, (Note: Pact; Contract (契約, Keiyaku) in the Japanese version.) a magical bond which links their souls and grants the human partner great power at the cost of some physical ability or personal trait (their voice, singing abilities, etc.). Pacts are normally entered into by beasts so they can feed off negative emotions, but sometimes they will enter a pact for other reasons. A recurring element across the series is the representation of magic using the Celestial Alphabet, with a common letter arrangement representing the human gene.

The universe of the Drakengard series is split between multiple timelines. Events in those timelines are separate, but they can overlap. The core timeline is formed from Drakengard and its sequel. Drakengard 3 acts as the first game's prequel, but most of its events take place in separate timelines leading to different outcomes. In Drakengard 3, a malevolent flower uses servants called the Intoners, women gifted with the power to use magic through song, as instruments of humanity's destruction. In Drakengard, which succeeds the fifth version of Drakengard 3's events detailed in a supplementary novel, the Watchers use a group known as the Cult of Watchers (Note: Cult of Watchers; Church of Angels (天使の教会, Tenshi no Kyōkai) in the Japanese version.) to spark a religious war and destroy the seals. In Drakengard 2, the Watchers continue to use the former head of the cult to destroy the new seals, while the dragons prepare to usurp the gods and rule over the world. Nier is set in an alternative reality created by events stemming from Drakengard's fifth ending: in this reality, our modern world was decimated by a plague created by the magical beings who came through the portal, bringing humanity to the brink of extinction. Nier: Automata takes place after the fourth ending of Nier, featuring appearances and mentions of characters from both Nier and the Drakengard games.

=== Gameplay ===
The Drakengard games feature a mix of action-based hack-and-slash combat during ground-based battles and aerial combat mixed in with RPG leveling mechanics. In the original, the player guides the characters around ground-based battles to combat small groups of enemy units. In aerial combat, the player takes control of the protagonist's dragon partner. In these situations, the dragon can either lock onto a target and unleash a barrage of small fireballs, or the player can manually aim and fire large bursts of flame, which do more damage but do not home in on a target. Basic gameplay changed little for Drakengard 2, but there are some differences and additions, such as weapon types being tied to the character they are associated with, with changing them also swapping the character. The dragon gameplay remained virtually unchanged, apart from the ability, during air-ground missions, for the dragon to swoop down on a group of enemies in a special attack depicted in a short cutscene.

In Nier and Drakengard 3, the player controls the main protagonist with two other characters acting as AI-controlled supports. Drakengard 3 was designed to be a faster experience than the previous games, with the protagonist being given a special hyper-mode and the ability to freely switch between weapons without pausing the action. Aerial gameplay was also changed, with the dragon now capable of ground combat. Nier, while featuring similar hack-and-slash combat, also includes other gameplay types such as a top-down view for puzzle areas, 2D style areas for buildings or similar structures. Side-quests were also added, which often involved fetch quests, fishing and farming.

=== Themes and influences ===
One of the running narrative themes for the main series is Immorality, which also became the key character theme and was expressed through their personalities and actions. The second game also focused on themes of war and death. The theme for the world of Drakengard 3, as described by composer Keiichi Okabe, is "the sense of contrast". Multiple anime series have influenced the series' characters over the years, including Neon Genesis Evangelion, Sister Princess and Puella Magi Madoka Magica. The series writer, Sawako Natori, drew inspiration for her writing from shōnen manga. The original game world was designed around Celtic and Norse myths, together with Japanese-style revisionism. The team for the original game were influenced by Asian epic movies and western action-adventure films such as the 1999 remake of The Mummy and Dragonheart. While developing Nier, the team drew inspiration from the God of War series, while the narrative structure was inspired by the September 11 attacks and the war on terror. The central theme of Nier: Automata is struggling out of a bad situation, defined by the game's staff using the Japanese word "agaku".

=== Related media ===
The games received multiple adaptations and additional story content in the form of novelizations, manga and supplementary material. The first game received two novelizations: Drag-On Dragoon: Side Story on November 28, 2003, and Drag-On Dragoon: Magnitude "Negative" on January 23, 2004. The first book was written by Emi Nagashima, writing under her pen name of Jun Eishima, and the second by Takashi Aizawa. The novelization of Drakengard 2, written again by Nagashima, was released on September 30, 2005.

Nagashima wrote character stories and manga for Drakengard 3 leading up to that game's release. The manga was Drag-On Dragoon: Utahime Five, a prequel following the game's main antagonists, and Drag-On Dragoon: Shi ni Itaru Aka, which acts as a sequel, although for Branch A, as it along with Branches B, C, D, and E lead to alternative timelines. A book detailing the narrative connection between Drakengard 3 and Drakengard, titled Drag-On Dragoon 3 Story Side, which serves as the fifth branch similar to the events of B and D, narrated by Brother One, was released on 28 August 2014. Drag-On Dragoon 3 Complete Guide + Setting, a complete guide to the game with extra features explaining the game chronology and a novella set after the events of Shi ni Itaru Aka, was published by ASCII Media Works in 2014.

Nier was expanded after release with a CD drama which told of events immediately after the events of Drakengard's fifth ending, and a supplementary book titled Grimoire Nier containing extra stories and concept art alongside a fifth ending for the game. Square Enix also paired up with WildStorm to create a digital comic, which detailed the backstories of the game's characters and world.

The Japanese girl band Yorha performed on the Drakengard 3 soundtrack, and in 2015 performed a stage production written by Yoko Taro that is directly related to the plot of Nier: Automata. The band's fictional backstory places them as military androids similar to the playable characters in Automata.

== Reception ==
Aggregate review scores
Game	Metacritic
Drakengard	63/100 (PS2)
Drakengard 2	58/100 (PS2)
Nier	68/100 (PS3); 67/100 (X360)
Drakengard 3	61/100 (PS3)
Nier: Automata	88/100 (PS4); 84/100 (PC); 90/100 (XONE); 89/100 (NS)
Nier Reincarnation	58/100 (iOS)
Nier Replicant ver.1.22474487139...	83/100 (PS4); 83/100 (XONE); 80/100 (PC)

The Drakengard series has received mixed to positive reviews over the years. So far, the original Drakengard has received the most positive response of the main series games. Drakengard 2 and Drakengard 3 have received lower scores. Each title in the series has received favorable review scores from Japanese gaming magazine Famitsu.

The common point of praise for the series through most of its life has been the story. While individual aspects have come in for criticism, the dark atmospheres, unconventional characters and general scenarios have been cited as one of each game's strengths. Despite some mixed feelings from reviewers either for the story as a whole or certain aspects of it, the characters and plot of Drakengard 3 have also been praised. The major exception is Drakengard 2: the story's lighter tone and more traditional narrative were noted and sometimes criticized for being overly simplistic or too similar to other games in the genre. The Drakengard characters have remained popular in Japan, with Dengeki holding a popularity contest for those characters to celebrate the series' tenth anniversary and the announcement of Drakengard 3. Among the most popular characters were the first game's main protagonists, Caim and Angelus (the former having earned the nickname Prince (王子, ouji) among fans). The characters of Drakengard 3 have also proved to be highly popular.

The gameplay has so far come in for major criticism, with the original title's aerial and ground-based gameplay being seen as repetitive and dull, although some reviewers found it entertaining. Drakengard 2 also came in for such criticism, although minor improvements were cited. In contrast, the gameplay of Drakengard 3 was generally praised or seen as an improvement upon the previous two entries, though the dragon-riding segments came in for criticisms for difficult controls. Opinions were divided on Nier's unconventional mix of gameplay styles from multiple game genres, with some praising the variety and others seeing it as poorly executed. The series as a whole has gained a cult following in Japan.

Each game has sold relatively well in its home market. The original game was a commercial success, selling over 120,000 units in the first week of release and eventually selling over 240,000 copies in Japan. Drakengard 2's first-week sales were similarly impressive, selling 100,000 units. It sold over 203,000 copies by the end of 2005. Drakengard 3 sold just under 115,000 units in its first week, and over 150,000 units by May 2014. The two versions of Nier—Gestalt and Replicant—sold roughly 12,500 and 60,000 copies in their first week respectively. Replicant eventually sold over 121,000 in Japan by the end of May 2010. The series has sold over 770,000 units in Japan as of May 2014. (Note: Drakengard series: Sales as of April 2014: Drakengard: 241,014 units; Drakengard 2: 203,336 units; Nier: 181,000 units (60,000 plus for Gestalt, 121,000 plus Replicant); Drakengard 3: 150,866 units) Sales figures for western regions are unavailable. The first two games in the main series have both been included in Square Enix's Ultimate Hits series, re-releases of popular titles developed or published by them. Nier: Automata became a worldwide success, shipping over 4 million copies by June 2019, becoming the best-selling title in the franchise. As of July 2021, Automata has sold over 6 million units worldwide. Less than two months after its release, the remaster of Replicant had shipped over one million copies worldwide, two times the estimated sales of the original game.

== See also ==
- List of Square Enix video game franchises
