= Drakengard 3 =

2013 action role-playing video game

- North American box art
- Developer: Access Games
- Publisher: Square Enix
- Directors: Keisuke Mori; Yoko Taro
- Producer: Takamasa Shiba
- Programmer: Tomoki Takaura
- Artist: Kimihiko Fujisaka
- Writers: Yoko Taro; Sawako Natori
- Composers: Keiichi Okabe; Keigo Hoashi; Sho Ishihama; Kuniyuki Takahashi
- Series: Drakengard
- Engine: Unreal Engine 3
- Platform: PlayStation 3
- Release: JP: December 19, 2013; NA: May 20, 2014; PAL: May 21, 2014
- Genres: Action role-playing, hack and slash
- Mode: Single-player

Drakengard 3, known in Japan as Drag-On Dragoon 3, (Note: Japanese: ドラッグ オン ドラグーン3, Hepburn: Doraggu On Doragūn Surī) is a 2013 action role-playing video game developed by Access Games and published by Square Enix exclusively for PlayStation 3. It is the third main game in the Drakengard series and a prequel to the original game. The game, like the rest of the series, features a mixture of ground-based hack-and-slash combat and aerial battles. The story focuses on Zero, a woman who can manipulate magic through song. Partnering with a dragon named Mikhail, Zero set out to kill her five sisters, who rule the world's regions. As she travels, the player discovers the true reason behind Zero's rampage.

The game, created to cater for hardcore role-playing game audiences, was developed by the same team who created the original Drakengard and series spin-off Nier, including producer Takamasa Shiba, director Yoko Taro and writer Sawako Natori. The music was composed by Keiichi Okabe, who also scored Nier. Unlike previous titles in the series, the team developed the game at Access Games, due to the company's experience at developing action titles and the team's wish to address criticisms laid at the gameplay of previous Drakengard games. Drakengard 3 received mixed to positive reviews and sales in Japan and mixed reviews in the west. The ground-based gameplay and story were generally praised, while common criticisms included the dragon gameplay, graphics and multiple technical issues.

== Gameplay ==
The ground-based and aerial combat, featuring protagonists Zero and Mikhail

Drakengard 3 features hack-and-slash gameplay and aerial combat on a dragon, as with previous entries in the series. The player controls the main protagonist Zero during the entire campaign and for most levels is accompanied by up to two AI-controlled companions. In ground-based combat, Zero performs multiple attacks on various enemies. These can be combined into combos, which fill up Zero's Tension Gauge. When the gauge is filled to any degree, Zero can temporarily enter Intoner Mode, a hyperactive state which enables her to move quickly and deal high damage to enemies while also making her immune to attack. As Zero levels up, weapons grow more powerful and Zero gains access to multiple weapon types as the game progresses. Each weapon type produces a different set of attacking moves. Unlike previous titles in the series, the player does not have to pause the games to switch weapons, instead being able to do it at any time without pausing.

Zero can switch between four weapon types: swords, spears, combat bracers and chakrams. Each weapon has a four-level cap and can be leveled up either through combat or by spending money acquired during levels. Each weapon has different effects depending on enemy-type and combat situation, with spears being useful against heavily armored or shielded enemies and swords being a default weapon. While exploring levels, Zero can collect items from chests and fallen enemies which earn money for buying potions, as well as buying and leveling weapons. Zero can also complete sidequests as the player progresses through the game: these sidequests place within areas of normal levels and limitations on the player's abilities. The player's performance during them earns special items and the number of items you earn increases with the number of enemies killed.

For aerial combat, Zero mounts her dragon Mikhail. The two main types of aerial combat are rail shooter-style missions and free-roaming combat which enables both aerial and ground-based combat. Mikhail has multiple attack types at his disposal: while on the ground, after Zero has mounted, the dragon can perform a sweeping attack using his wings and snap at them. During combat in the air, Mikhail can breathe fire down onto the ground and at airborne enemies. Mikhail is fully controllable while in the air, flying through the environment and being able to evade enemy fire. Mikhail's main attack, breathing fire, features a lock-on feature which can take in multiple enemies. Mikhail can also enter Intoner Mode while Zero is mounted, which magnifies the amount of damage he can deal. During ground-based missions, Zero can also call in Mikhail to deal damage to enemy units.

== Story ==
=== Setting and characters ===
Drakengard 3 takes place roughly one hundred years before the events of the first Drakengard game, acting as a prequel to the first two games in the series. Despite being a prequel, Drakengard 3 mostly follows separate timelines unrelated to the events of Drakengard. In earlier times, the land was ravaged by conflict between warlords. At the height of the carnage, five mysterious figures called Intoners (Note: Intoners; Songstresses (歌姫, Utahime) in the Japanese version.) appeared and using their ability to utilize magic through song, defeated the warlords and ended the conflict. (Note: Narrator: Long ago, in an age tarnished by endless conflict, five beautiful goddesses descended upon the land. The goddesses sang mystical songs that restored peace and harmony to our broken world. The people began to worship these holy songstresses and came to refer to them as Intoners. (Opening)) Due to this, they become worshiped as deities and became rulers of various regions of the land. An unspecified time later, in the game's present, the strongest Intoner, One, wishes to unite the five once again and bring stability to the land. The source of the Intoners' power is an evil magical flower. Zero (ゼロ), the main protagonist and antihero, was saved from death to be used as an instrument for mankind's destruction. Zero wishes to destroy all those affected by its power, namely herself and her "sisters" who were spawned by the flower after Zero attempted suicide to ensure the safety of the world. (Note: Zero: The first time I saw this flower... was the day I died. Now I'm just a corpse being kept alive by the flower's magic. [...] This flower is a calamity that threatens the entire world. It's growing, feeding off me. Eventually it's going to consume me entirely, and once that happens? Once it's fully grown? It's going to destroy everything. [...] When I realized that I was infected with a flower that was going to end the world, I tried to kill myself. Well, technically I was already dead, but, yeah. Anyway, I tried to rip the damn thing out. But, in the end, I just made things worse. The flower freaked out. Started sprouting these... children. Five little girls, one after another. They burst out of me and ran off before I could blink. [...] Anyway, I made my choice. I decided to kill my sisters, and then destroy the flower. (Branch D, Verse 7))

The player controls Zero, who is now considered a traitor by the Intoners and their followers because of her mission to kill them. Aiding her on her quest is the dragon Mikhail (ミハイル, Mihairu), who is her mount in aerial battle. The other five Intoners are: One (ワン, Wan), the current ruler of the Intoners; Two (トウ, Tō), the more cheerful member of the group and ruler of the Country of Sand; Three (スリイ, Surii), ruler of the Country of Forest and an obsessive over dolls; Four (フォウ, Fō), ruler of the Country of Mountain and the only virgin of the group; and Five (ファイブ, Faibu), ruler of the Country of Sea and a woman consumed by greed for everything. Traveling with Zero on her quest are the disciples, (Note: Disciples; Apostles (使徒達, Shito-tachi) in the Japanese version.) a group who formerly served the Intoners and accompany Zero after their original mistresses are killed. They include: Cent (セント, Sento), a dumb and overconfident man, as well as the lover of the Intoner Two; Octa (オクタ, Okuta), an old and cunning man obsessed with sex; Decadus (デカート, Dekāto) a gentlemanly warrior with a masochistic streak; and Dito (ディト), a sadistic young man. Each of the disciples helps the Intoner summon angels and daemons into battle. The game is narrated to the player by Accord (アコール, Akōru), an android created by the "old world" to monitor and document all timelines. (Note: Zero: What the hell are you, anyway? / Accord: We're Recorders. [...] It's our job to record world events from the ancient past to the distant future. You know the Old World you people are always going on about? Well, I was sent by folks from there. (Branch B, Chapter 2, Lost Verse 2))

=== Plot ===
Zero and her dragon Michael slaughter their way into the Cathedral City, the center of power for the Intoners. Zero's attempt to kill them directly ends disastrously: she and Michael are gravely wounded by One's own dragon, Gabriel. A year later, Zero and her dragon, now a childlike reincarnation named Mikhail, set off to try killing the Intoners again. They first travel to the Land of Seas to face Five: during the fight, Five is killed by her disciple Dito, whom Zero takes into her service. The group then journey to the Land of Mountains and face Four: after Four's death, Zero recruits Decadus. They then proceed to the Land of Forests. There, Three's disciple Octa attempts to betray his mistress, but she forces him to help her fight Zero. She is killed by Mikhail, who is then attacked and captured by daemons summoned by Two and Cent. Zero pursues them to the Land of Sand, freeing Mikhail from captivity and facing the two. Mikhail kills Two and Cent joins Zero. The group then fight their way into the Cathedral City, where Zero transforms the Disciples into their true dove forms, freeing them from their service to her. (Note: Zero: It's unavoidable. Disciples can't remain in human form without an Intoner's power. Sooner or later, you'll disappear. So before that happens... I'm giving you your old forms back. (Branch A, Chapter 5, Verse 3)) During her battle with One, Mikhail dies wounding Gabriel, allowing a distraught Zero to finish off Gabriel and One. Zero is then killed by a male clone of One, who decides to create a new religious order in memory of his "sister." (Note: One: I see... If there are no Intoners left to protect the world... Then I'll just protect it myself! We'll form a new religion. A religion that worships my sister One. (Branch A, Chapter 5, Ending A))

After this, Accord tells of three alternate series of events or "branches," caused by a group of singularities (Zero, her sisters, and the disciples) coming together. (Note: Accord: In the flow of post-Cataclysm history, if a unique set of conditions known as "singularities" come together, splits occur in time, resulting in the multiple world divergence phenomenon. (Branch B, Verse 1)) In the second branch, while in the Land of Forests and having already recruited Cent, Zero finds the surviving sisters being driven insane by the power of the flower: Three dies of unknown causes, causing her soldiers to go mad. Eventually, the group find One has been killed by a deranged Two. Brought back under her influence, Cent turns on the group, killing Octa and Dito. Two and Decadus kill each other, while Zero kills Cent: before dying, Two and Cent summon their angel Raphael, which poisons Mikhail before being killed. In order to save Mikhail, Zero activates the flower's power and forms a "pact," resurrecting him. (Note: Accord: By utilizing the reprogramming function of the flower, the singularity known as Zero has created a new concept known as a pact. I do not know how this will affect the future. However, I will continue to observe events as they unfold. (Branch B, Ending B)) In the third branch, after rescuing Mikhail from Two's stronghold, the dragon is devolved back to his child form by Two's powers. Upon arrival in the Cathedral City, the group faces Two, who destroys the four disciples when they kill her. Zero then faces One, who reveals that she knows the true nature of the Intoners and reveals the reason behind Zero's partnership with Mikhail: once the other Intoners were dead, Mikhail was to kill Zero, destroying the flower's power. (Note: One: Intoners offer only pestilence to this world. Someday, they will be the disease that brings ruin to all human life. That's why you're trying to kill us: to save the world. And once you succeed in killing your sisters... You're going to finish the job... and kill yourself. And you'll use that dragon to do it. (Branch C, Verse 5)) Gabriel and Mikhail kill each other and Zero and One engage in an enraged battle. After killing One, Zero, still in shock from Mikhail's death, sets off to try to find another dragon who can kill her. It is implied in Accord's closing report that she fails. (Note: Accord: The Intoner Zero completed her objective. However, the dragon Mikhail has died and Zero's mental health is in a rather alarming state. I'm afraid there's little chance of finding a solution in this timeline. As such, I recommend sealing off this branch. (Branch C, Ending C))

In the fourth and final branch of Zero's set of timelines, as she proceeds on her quest, she encounters each of her sisters possessed by the flower's power, as well as interacting directly with Accord. In each battle with the sisters, the Disciples summon their angels and transform into doves until only Octa remains. In the Cathedral City, Zero and Octa face off against One while Mikhail challenges Gabriel. Octa sacrifices himself to restrain One. Finally, Accord decides to intervene and sacrifices herself so Zero can kill One, which in turn kills Gabriel and saves Mikhail. Upon absorbing the power of all five Intoners, Zero transforms into a stone monster and engages with Mikhail in a rhythm game-style battle. Upon winning, Mikhail destroys the monster and Accord's voice declares that the flower's evil has been sealed away, although there is still the possibility of it reappearing in another time and place. She also suspects that Zero might have survived. (Note: Accord: Recording. The Intoners have been sealed off in another world. The threat of the flower has been extinguished from this branch. However, the possibility exists that this seal could unravel itself at some time or location in the future. Until then, our recording efforts will continue. Oh. And a personal addendum regarding my observational target, Zero. Perhaps this is beyond my functional requirements as a recorder, but I cannot shake the feeling that somehow, somewhere, Zero is still alive. And that, someday... Someday, she and I will see each other again. Crazy, I know. Call it a hunch. (Branch D, The Final Song)) In a post-credits scene, a new version of Accord replaces the one destroyed by Zero and many others join her in helping record world events. As they disperse, the new Accord speaks to the player, hoping to see them again and thanking them for playing, before the screen goes black. (Note: Accord: I hope to see you again someday. But until then... I'd like to say... Thank you for playing. (Branch D, The Final Song))

== Development ==
Drakengard 3 was conceived when Takamasa Shiba and Yoko Taro, the respective producer and director of the original game, met up years after Cavia, the company where they created the series, was absorbed into AQ Interactive. The two resurrected early plans to create a third entry in the series. As part of the brainstorming process, the company used fan questionnaires, from which the team learned that many wanted a dark story similar to Nier for the next entry in the series. Speaking about the creation of the game, Shiba said that Drakengard 3 was made partly because the company was making fewer single-player RPG console games and he wished to capture the atmosphere of earlier days. Alongside that was Shiba's ambition to show that the RPG fanbase was now a mainstream community that wanted a more hardcore gaming experience.

The game was developed by Access Games, who were noted for the survival horror Deadly Premonition, and built using Unreal Engine 3. Shiba noted that the company was "just really good at creating action games", which would enable the team to address criticisms laid at the previous games in the series for their poor combat while still being able to craft a story true to the Drakengard series. Production began in 2011, after Access Games were contacted by Shiba during that year's Tokyo Game Show. Yoko co-directed with Access Games' Keisuke Mori. By the time the game was unveiled in early 2013, it was 60% complete, and Yoko commented "It's not Drakengard or Nier. If you're expecting that, you'll be disappointed." The opening CGI cinematic was created by Visual Works. The scene was based on a storyboard produced by Yoko, and director Kazuyuki Ikumori aimed to make the scene beautiful despite its gory content. Visual Works also handled the game's in-game cutscenes, with one staff member describing it as a difficult period as they needed to produce over 100 minutes of cutscenes within a short time period.

=== World design ===
Kimihiko Fujisaka, character designer for the previous entries in the series, reprised his role. In designing the characters, Fujisaka used the previous two games' "Medieval Europe" inspiration for the enemies, while leaning towards more modern designs for the main characters. In addition to Fujisaka, actor Shinnosuke Ikehata, who had voiced key characters in previous games in the series, returned to do voice work, and writer Sawako Natori, who had worked on Drakengard, Drakengard 2 and Nier, returned to write the scenario with Yoko. The story was written to have "a good balance of darkness and humor", according to Shiba: he said that there was "actually a good bit of [darkness], in the in-game dialogue for example." The team did not want to turn it into a completely dark story, instead still having scenes that people could laugh at. Yoko did not want the emotions of the various characters to fall into simple stereotypes, or for there to be a simplistic take on the situation. He also wanted to create a strange "abnormal" picture for the players: the cited instance was the contrast between the fear and terror displayed by enemy soldiers and the often vulgar dialogue between Zero and her companions. He also stated that he went through a large part of the game's development "half-laughing".

During the story development process, the team decided upon a female protagonist as the game's lead, in contrast to the previous games, which had featured male protagonists, along with a large number of other female characters: this was primarily because all other proposals had been rejected or scrapped. Many aspects of Zero's design and abilities were intended to evoke the game's gritty atmosphere, while the flower growing from her eye was almost cut when Shiba thought it would be too much of a risk for the series when coupled with the character's gender. A couple of Yoko's ideas that were cut out or rejected during development included a fully contemporary setting with a school-girl protagonist, and calling the game Drakengard 4 instead of Drakengard 3, with the story revolving around searching for the missing installment in the series. Yoko, Natori and supplementary writer Emi Nagashima were jointly responsible for creating the disciples' personalities. Yoko wanted Nagashima to write Cent to be as much of an idiot as possible, while she received some negative feedback for her portrayal of Decadus despite her best efforts. Octa was the character Natori and Nagashima best understood, though Nagashima found it difficult writing his novella. While writing Mikhail's dialogue, Natori was asked by Yoko to embody the good qualities of animals and children in him. Instead of being realistic, Natori borrowed elements from other fiction to create his personality, finding him the most fun to write. The dialogue between Zero and her disciples was written by Yoko to contrast in content with the violent combat. Elements of fourth-wall breaking were included in the game, such as some of Zero's dialogue or Accord's actions during the final ending: this both acted as a callback to Drakengard, and to suggest that the real world was simply another branch of the Drakengard universe.

Fujisaka's design for Zero was the first to be approved by Yoko. The other Intoners were designed fairly quickly after that: Yoko told Fujisaka to "think Puella Magi Madoka Magica" when designing them. Each character had different design themes: for example, Five's was nudity and knitwear, Four's was her being a female captain, and Two's were underwear and "lolita". Three was meant to have bangs covering her face and multiple hairpins, but this was dropped. The characters' number-based names and differing eye colors were meant to help players identify them, while aspects of Zero's design were incorporated into the other Intoners to emphasize their connections. The Apostles were designed and approved quickly as they were not a high priority. They were designed around prime male archetypes: Cent, originally the group's sadist, was the "pretty boy", Octa was the "old man", Decadus was the "middle-aged man", and Dito was the "little boy".

=== Music ===
The game's music was created by the music studio Monaca; its composers were Keiichi Okabe, Keigo Hoashi, Sho Ishihama and Kuniyuki Takahashi. Additional tracks were provided by Akitaka Tohyama. Okabe, who also led composition for Nier, wished to match the work of Drakengard composer Nobuyoshi Sano, finding creating it a new experience. He was also requested by Yoko not to follow the musical route of either Drakengard or Nier and was inspired by the game's theme of "the sense of contrast". One of the game's theme songs, "Kuroi Uta" (クロイウタ; Black Song), was sung by Eir Aoi, a singer native to Hokkaido who was a self-confessed fan of the Drakengard series. Her liking of the series was the reason Shiba selected her to perform the theme song. The lyrics were written by Kikuchi Hana, one of Nier's scenario writers. The game's second theme song, "This Silence Is Mine", used in the game's Tokyo Game Show trailer, was specially written and sung by Onitsuka Chihiro. Drag-on Dragoon 3 Original Soundtrack was released on January 21, 2014, under the catalog number SQEX-10414~5. The theme songs were released both as part of the soundtrack and as singles.

== Release and merchandise ==
Drakengard 3 was announced in Japan in March 2013 through Japanese game magazine Famitsu. Drakengard 3 received few gameplay previews and was promoted in the form of novellas: this was because Shiba wished for the game's story to be a mystery for players. The game was originally meant to be released in October 2013 in Japan, but was pushed back to December due to Square Enix wanting to improve the overall quality of the game and ensure it met fan expectation. The game released in Japan on December 19, 2013 In the West, it released on May 20, 2014, in North America, and May 21 in Europe. The localization was handled by 8-4, who had worked with Yoko localizing Nier.

While it received a physical and digital release in Japan and North America, Drakengard 3 was released in digital format only in Europe. It was also localized into Chinese with the assistance of Sony Computer Entertainment Japan Asia, in an attempt to actively tap into the Chinese-speaking market. The collector's edition released in Japan also included an outfit inspired by Kainé, the female protagonist of Nier. A limited collector's edition was also released in North America, Europe and Australia through Square Enix. It contained a prequel novel concerning the game's main characters, a scenario involving One, and DLC for both Japanese voice acting and a costume for Zero inspired by the first game's protagonist.

Alongside the game, there were also two manga released in Japan written by Emi Nagashima under her pen name Jun Eishima: Drag-On Dragoon: Utahime Five, a prequel focusing on the other Intoners, and Drag-On Dragoon: Shi ni Itaru Aka, which acts as the game's sequel. Both manga were created and written with Yoko's supervision. The game was complemented with multiple DLC packs: they included multiple character outfits for Zero inspired by previous series protagonists, cosmetic adornments for Mikhail, and six prequel chapters detailing past events in the lives of both Zero and her sisters. This DLC was later released in the west along with alternate music for Zero's Intoner Mode sequences. ASCII Media Works also published a complete guide to the game, which included guides to the series history and a novella following on from Shi ni Itaru Aka which retold the events of Drakengard. A novel, Drag-on Dragoon 3 Side Story, was released on 28 August 2014. The novel detailed a fifth series of events connecting the narratives of Drakengard 3 and Drakengard, as none of the game's endings did so.

== Reception ==
Reception

Aggregate score
Aggregator	Score
Metacritic	61/100

Review scores
Publication	Score
Destructoid	8.5/10
Eurogamer	5/10
Famitsu	34/40
Game Informer	6/10
GameSpot	7/10
GamesRadar+	3/5
IGN	4.8/10

Drakengard 3 received "mixed or average" reviews, according to Western video game review aggregator Metacritic. The game received a 34/40 from Famitsu, with the four reviewers giving it scores of 9, 9, 8 and 8. Anime News Network's Todd Ciolek named it Game of the Year in 2014.

The story received mixed reviews. Famitsu was generally positive about the world and characters, praising the character dialogue. Destructoid's Chris Carter stated that the story compelled him to "truck forward and figure it all out for [himself]", while he found the dialogue between the characters funny and their relationships entertaining. Game Informer's Kimberley Wallace was less enthusiastic, saying that while there were a few interesting scenes, "the narrative and characters make a lot of missteps." IGN's Meghan Sullivan criticized the story for being too slow and too reliant on foreknowledge of the previous games, while calling the main characters "poorly written". GameSpot's Heidi Kemps generally praised the story, especially the ways it poked fun at the genre and focus on the many paths the game took players down, while GamesRadar's Becky Cunningham called the story "the main reason to play [the game], especially as it approaches medieval fantasy with dark comedy instead of straight-laced tropes." Eurogamer's Chris Schilling said that the game played out "like a jet-black comedy", calling its narrative far colder than that of Nier, while praising Zero's characterization.

In contrast to previous titles in the series, the gameplay received praise. Famitsu was again positive, despite it not having many distinguishing features to separate it from other video games in the genre. Sullivan praised the ground aspect of gameplay, especially Zero's Intoner Mode, but criticized the dragon gameplay as awkward and exacerbated by the poor control layout. Cunningham said that the combat will "keep [players] on [their] toes", praising the balance between character and enemy power and the weapon switching ability, but being more mixed about the dragon gameplay. Carter called the action gameplay his "favorite part", referring to it as a faster and smoother version of combat from the Dynasty Warriors series, while Kemps found it generally satisfactory despite its simplicity, while citing the dragon sections as "a welcome, if not always particularly well-designed, break from stabbing troops directly." Wallace was positive about many aspects of the system, but stated that it got bogged down by the level design and predictable enemy movements. Schilling enjoyed the ground-based gameplay despite its simplicity, comparing it to "a cross between [DmC: Devil May Cry] and Dynasty Warriors", but cited the dragon gameplay as far less enjoyable. Poor AI for Zero's companions and dragon drew criticism.

The graphics and level design were generally criticized. Cunningham called the environments "very bland" when compared to the narrative, while Wallace generally criticized the in-game level and character design, though cited the cinematic cutscenes as an improvement. In contrast, Carter praised the character design and called the other visuals "absolutely beautiful". Sullivan was generally negative, citing the level design and narrow color palette as part of her critique, and comparing the graphics to a game from the PlayStation 2 era. Schilling generally faulted the game for its textures, graphics and character design, despite noting the developers' attempts to lampoon gaming conventions. Technical issues such as frequent frame rate drops, an erratic camera and screen tearing were cited as general faults with the game.

=== Sales ===
During its first week on sale in Japan, Drakengard 3 sold 114,024 copies, coming fourth in Japanese sale charts and reached 125,500 units by the end of the year. Total physical sales in Japan as of May 2014 have reached 150,866 units. It reached 79th place on Famitsu's list of 100 best-selling titles of the year, while it reached 62nd place Dengeki Online's list.
