= List of Nier: Automata Ver1.1a episodes =

Series logo

Nier: Automata Ver1.1a is a Japanese anime television series based on the 2017 action role-playing game Nier: Automata. The plot follows androids of the YoRHa military force fighting for humanity in a proxy war with alien-created Machine Lifeforms. It is produced by A-1 Pictures and directed by Ryōji Masuyama. The characters are designed by animation director Jun Nagai, the scenario is co-written by Masuyama and original director Yoko Taro. The music is composed by Studio Monaca.

The anime series began airing in January during the late-night slot on Tokyo MX, Tochigi Television, Gunma Television, and BS11. An English-subtitled version is simulcast on Crunchyroll. It has been delayed twice due to production issues caused by the COVID-19 pandemic. An English dubbed version began streaming on Crunchyroll in March 2023. After the broadcasting of the final four episodes of the first cours, production on a second cours was announced to be green-lit. The second cours aired from July to September 2024.

== Episodes ==
No.	Title	Directed by	Written by	Storyboarded by	Original release date	Ref.
Part 1
1	"or not to [B]e"	Ryōji Masuyama	Ryōji Masuyama	Ryōji Masuyama	January 8, 2023	
YoRHa android soldier 2B is sent on a mission to destroy a Goliath-class Machine lifeform. However, the rest of her unit is destroyed en route, leaving her the sole survivor. Landing at an abandoned factory, 2B fights her way through multiple machines before meeting with 9S, another android specializing in reconnaissance and electronic warfare. They both scout the factory searching for the Goliath until it activates as a massive, building sized Machine. 9S attempts to hack the Goliath but is severely damaged in the process. Angered, 2B destroys the Goliath but is left stranded on top of its remains with 9S as they are surrounded by three more Goliaths. Realizing there is no chance for escape, 2B and 9S self-destruct their black boxes, destroying the Goliaths and the factory along with themselves. Sometime later, 2B is revived in a new body at the Bunker, YoRHa's orbital headquarters, with her data having been backed up right before her destruction. She reunites with 9S and finds out to her dismay that 9S prioritized backing up her data first, so he has lost all of his memories shortly after they first met. Alternate Ending: While 9S is explaining how black boxes work, 2B accidentally touches her black box against his, triggering a chain reaction that destroys the Bunker.
2	"city e[S]cape"	Satsuki Takahashi	Ryōji Masuyama	Ryōji Masuyama	January 15, 2023	
The Council of Humanity addresses YoRHa with a speech explaining that Aliens invaded Earth with an army of Machine Lifeforms in the year 5012, forcing what remains of Humanity to retreat to the Moon and build an army of androids in the form of the Resistance on Earth and YoRHa in space with the intention of retaking the planet. Meanwhile on Earth, a Machine designated PLAO8 begins to develop intelligence and instead of attacking the Resistance, decides to learn to grow flowers. 2B and 9S are assigned to head to Earth to investigate why YoRHa's liaison with the Resistance has gone silent. The Resistance sends a team led by the fighter Lily to recover supplies, only for them to be ambushed by an army of Machines. Lily and her surviving team lure the Machines onto a booby-trapped bridge while PLAO8 tries to stop from trampling its flowers. 2B and 9S then arrive and destroy the bridge and the Machines, with PLAO8 being destroyed in the crossfire. Elsewhere, more Machines begin reading old books left behind by Humanity as an ominous cocoon like structure is being built. Alternate Ending: 2B and 9S receive a post card from Yoko asking about the purpose of their OS chips. Curious, 2B removes her own OS chip, inadvertently killing herself.
3	"break ti[M]e"	Kōsuke Madoka & Yūki Matsuo	Ryōji Masuyama	Seishirō Nagaya	January 22, 2023	
2B and 9S are guided to the Resistance Camp, where Lily reveals she is the overall leader of the Resistance. At the Bunker, it is revealed that 2B and 9S weren't sent to Earth to assist the Resistance, but to investigate mysterious behavior by the Machines, and YoRHa intends to use the Resistance as sacrificial pawns. Back on Earth, 2B and 9S meet another Resistance fighter, Jackass, who tells them about strangely behaving Machines in the nearby desert. 2B and 9S have Jackass guide them to the desert, where they are ambushed by a Machine patrol. 9S hacks one of the Machines and witnesses a vision of an ancient desert civilization that the Machines were copying. 2B destroys the Machines, and the group pursues another Machine that has decided to flee. Along the way, they discover the corpse of the YoRHa liaison, as well as a mysterious jamming signal. 2B and 9S trace the signal but accidentally fall into an underground chamber where they find a massive cocoon built out of Machine bodies. The cocoon then ejects a human-like Machine which the androids swiftly kill to stop it from evolving, but a second human-like Machine emerges from the corpse and attacks the pair, causing the chamber to collapse. Alternate Ending: 2B and 9S decide to ride a boar and a moose for fun, but 9S loses control of the moose and accidentally runs over a YoRHa squad. With the YorHa forces destroyed, Earth becomes a "paradise" for the Machines.
4	"a mountain too [H]igh"	Ayako Kōno	Yako Morimachi	Kengo Matsumoto & Tetsuya Akutsu	February 19, 2023	
The Machines are shown gaining more intelligence as they increasingly mimic human behavior. At the Resistance camp, 2B and 9S debrief Lily and Jackass on the human-like Machines they encountered, which YoRHa has dubbed "Adam" and "Eve". Jackass muses on the possibility of making peace with the Machines, but 9S flatly rejects the idea. 2B and 9S are then ordered to scout a nearby amusement park to investigate the disappearance of an android soldier. To their surprise, they find the Machines there are not hostile, and advance into a theater. There, they encounter an advanced Machine called the Songstress which attacks them on sight. 9S attempts to hack the Songstress and manages to catch a glimpse of her memories, where she fell in love with another Machine, who ignored her, and became obsessed with making herself look beautiful, turning her into the monstrous machine she is now. 2B manages to expose the Songstress' core and destroy her. 9S coldly declares Machines can't feel emotions and then destroys a pair of nonviolent Machines, much to 2B's concern. Alternate Ending: The Commander begins bossing around her subordinates in order to get the Bunker working at full efficiency, causing many of them to desert. With their numbers dwindling, YorHA eventually loses the war against the Machines and all androids are wiped out.
5	"mave[R]ick"	Satsuki Takahashi	Akira Kindaichi	Satsuki Takahashi	February 26, 2023	
Adam and Eve are shown steadily gaining intelligence as Adam eagerly reads old human books. 2B and 9S are given a mission by Lily to deliver supplies to a village of Machine lifeforms that have developed into a peaceful community and are willing to trade with the Resistance. They head to the village and meets its leader, Pascal, who explains that he and the other Machines in the village have severed themselves from the Machine network and now live peaceful lives. 2B and 9S are intrigued at how the Machines have been able to form a functional, human-like society. They then explore an underground chamber beneath the village, where they find an Emil head. 9S tries to hack it and catches brief glimpses of Emil's memories and deduces the Emil head is one of many robotic weapons developed by humans to fight the Machines. Pascal explains that the village revere the Emil head, as it was what triggered their desire for self-preservation and peace. However, 9S remains conflicted at the idea that Machines can grow beyond their programming. Meanwhile, Adam and Eve continue to gain more knowledge, and Adam convinces Eve to refer to him as the older brother. Alternate Ending: 2B and 9S demonstrate their self-destruct features, which merely damages their clothing. However, Emil observes this and decides to copy them, detonating his fusion reactor and destroying the planet in the process.
6	"[L]one wolf"	Toshimasa Ishii	Yūsuke Watanabe	Toshimasa Ishii	March 5, 2023	
2B, 9S, and Lily head out to set up a Machine early detection network. While 9S heads off to troubleshoot the system, Lily tells 2B about how the Resistance first met YoRHa. After a botched landing operation only left four YoRHa androids alive, led by a No. 2 model similar to 2B, they appealed to the Resistance for assistance. The Resistance, who weren't aware of YoRHA's existence at the time, mistrusted them, but their leader Rose agreed to work together. The combined group then headed for the location of a Machine server to destroy it. Along the way, Lily was infected by a Machine logic virus, which the Resistance had no way of curing. No. 2 intervened and convinced the team to subdue Lily instead and the YoRHA squad used a vaccine to cure her. The team then continued on to the server, only to be attacked by a massive Machine army. While the server was successfully destroyed, shutting down the Machines in the area, Lily was left as the sole survivor, leaving her bitter against YoRHa for refusing to send reinforcements. 2B then asks Lily if there is the possibility that any of the team survived the mission, but Lily expresses doubt. Elsewhere, it is revealed that No. 2 is still alive and fighting Machines on her own. Alternate Ending: Adam and Eve decide to try wearing school uniforms like humans used to. However, when Eve begins pestering Adam, Adam decides to leave to go fishing.
7	"[Q]uestionable actions"	Kōsuke Madoka	Yako Morimachi	Ryōji Masuyama, Tomohiko Itō & Yūki Matsuo	March 12, 2023	
Adam and Eve continue to accrue knowledge until Adam decides to visit the "Playground". Meanwhile, 2B and 9S remain on standby as they haven't been given new orders yet. Pascal then approaches them, asking them to help save a missing villager who wandered into the Forest Kingdom, a nation of similarly independent but highly hostile Machines. 2B and 9S agree to investigate and travel to the Forest Kingdom with Pascal, where they find all of its inhabitants massacred by an unknown assailant. Exploring the castle more, the group learns that the Forest Kingdom's original king had died over a century ago, and his followers carried on his legacy by transferring his memories into an infant machine which they protect to this day. They are able find the missing villager who was hiding with a surviving Forest Kingdom soldier, and the two of them have decided to marry, confusing 9S. The group then heads to the infant Forest King but are too late to prevent it from being killed by No. 2, now identified as the fugitive android A2. 2B and A2 briefly clash until A2's sword breaks, and she decides to withdraw. 9S asks A2 why she would betray YoRHa, but A2 retorts that it was YoRHa that betrayed her before taking her leave. Alternate Ending: Pascal is teaching a lesson to a class of Machine children until A2 suddenly arrives and kills him. With Pascal's death, his followers go berserk and destroy all androids on Earth.
8	"aji wo [K]utta?"	Asahi Yoshimura & Tomohiko Itō	Akira Kindaichi	Tomohiko Itō	March 19, 2023	
The Commander tasks 2B and 9S to track down and eliminate A2 but won't tell them what caused her to betray YoRHa. They try to gain more information by questioning the Resistance members. Lily recognizes A2 as No. 2, but hides that fact from 2B and 9S, instead telling them she has no idea where A2 is. The pair then head for the coastal ruins to find Jackass. After a brief discussion on human behaviors often considered unnecessary, 2B finds a Lunar Tear flower and wears it on her chest at Operator 6O's suggestion. 2B and 9S then split up. 2B finds Jackass fishing and questions her. Jackass reveals she doesn't know anything about A2 other than she used to be No. 2, which 2B has already known. 2B attempts to contact 9S but is concerned when she discovers his signal is jammed. Meanwhile, 9S hacks into the Bunker's system to try and find more information on A2 but is forced to disconnect when his intrusion is discovered. He then pursues what he thinks is A2 until he ends up in a surreal space and is attacked by an unknown entity. Elsewhere, Eve searches for Adam but is shocked when he cannot detect him on the Machine network. Alternate Ending: 2B receives a letter asking her how buildings are still standing even though humanity has left Earth thousands of years ago, and what she does in her spare time. 2B answers that the androids attempt to rebuild the cities in preparation for humanity's return, only for them to be destroyed again by the machines. She also explains she spends her free time fishing, and is tempted to eat a fish, which kills her.
9	"hun[G]ry for knowledge"	Isamu Yamaguchi	Akira Kindaichi	Yumi Kamakura & Ryōji Masuyama	July 23, 2023	
9S finds himself trapped in cyberspace by Adam, who proceeds to capture and torture him. 2B searches for 9S and finds coordinates leading to an underground installation. She requests support from the Bunker, but the Commander refuses to send any reinforcements. 2B continues on anyways and finds a Machine built replica of a human city. Inside, she finds Adam who has 9S prisoner. Adam reveals that the Machines had been evolving ever since they came to Earth and became fascinated with Humanity, to the point where they rebelled against and exterminated their alien masters centuries ago. He also claims Humanity has long been extinct already. In order to become closer to being human, Adam has severed his connection to the Machine network so he can experience human mortality and attacks 2B. 2B buys enough time for her and 9S's Pods to hack Adam, neutralizing his powers. Eve takes the killing blow from 2B meant for Adam, and 2B withdraws with 9S as the installation collapses and Eve dies in Adam's arms. Alternate Ending: 2B and 9S come up with T-shirt ideas, but it takes up so much of their time that they abandon their mission, leaving Earth at the mercy of the Machines.
10	"over[Z]ealous"	Takumi Doyama	Yūsuke Watanabe	Tomoyuki Munehiro & Ryōji Masuyama	July 23, 2023	
After Eve's destruction, 9S's body is sent back to the Bunker for repairs while the Commander orders 2B to eliminate Adam. 2B heads to Adam's last known location, which is a factory occupied by Machines that have formed a peaceful religious cult. 2B is led deeper into the factory to meet their leader, but it turns out to be a trap set by Adam, who uses his authority over the Machine network to turn the cult hostile against 2B. As 2B tries to escape, she encounters a Machine being remote controlled by 9S, who promises to help her. 9S shuts down the factory's power supply, allowing 2B to defeat a large Machine in her way while the rest of the Machines commit mass suicide in their religious fervor. Meanwhile, Adam's influence causes more Machines to go berserk as they start attacking everything in sight. 2B then receives a distress call from Lily requesting support at the Resistance camp. Alternate Ending: 9S meets the maintenance androids Devola and Popola and starts drinking desert rose alcohol. Devola and Popola are then attacked by a horde of Machines, but 9S is too drunk to help them, resulting in all three of their deaths.
11	"head[Y] battle"	Kengo Matsumoto, Yoshitsugu Kimura, Yoshiyuki Kumata & Asahi Yoshimura	Ryōji Masuyama	Masahiro Watanabe	July 23, 2023	
As Resistance and YoRHa forces all over the region are being attacked, 2B reaches the Resistance camp and links up with the survivors. At the Bunker, the Commander petitions the use of YoRHa's satellite laser cannons to assist in the battle, but she is blocked by the Council of Humanity who state that intervening in the battle does not align with their goals of attaining God through "Process 11". With assistance from 2B and a newly arrived 9S, the Resistance is able to stop the Machine army with the use of a wide area EMP. However, the Machines are then absorbed by a berserk Adam to create a massive Machine monster. With help from Pascal, 9S is able to hack into Adam's mind and lure him into a trap, though also witnesses Adam's grief of Eve's death. In the real world, the Resistance springs their trap, destroying Adam with a giant missile. However, Adam survives and moves to attack everybody before being truly destroyed by a massive laser beam. Alternate Ending: 2B and 9S show affection to their Pods, who realize that they may be becoming self aware and "alive".
12	"flowers for m[A]chines"	Satsuki Takahashi & Ryōji Masuyama	Ryōji Masuyama	Satsuki Takahashi & Ryōji Masuyama	July 23, 2023	
The Commander disobeys orders and uses the Bunker's satellite laser cannon to destroy Adam. However, the Pods still detect Adam's signal in the impact crater, so 2B and 9S head down to finish him off. When they find Adam, he is already mortally wounded and 2B and 9S finish him off. Adam accepts his death, seeing it as a way to reunite with Eve. With Adam dead, the Machines in the area shut down, ending their onslaught. Unfortunately, 9S is infected with a logic virus due to hacking Adam, and 2B is forced to mercy kill him and breaks down over his death. However, 9S manages to save himself by transferring his consciousness to a nearby Machine. In a post credit scene, during his time getting repaired at the Bunker, 9S connects with the Bunker's server. Sensing an anomaly, 9S prevents himself and 2B's data from synching with the Bunker server. As he investigates, he accidentally triggers the server's defense system and he encounters twin girls wearing red dresses, who claim they are observing the androids and help 9S discover truth about Project YoRHa. He learns that Humanity has long been extinct, and that Project YoRHa was created to raise android morale by fooling them into believing humans are still living on the Moon. 9S then wakes up and responds to 2B's request for backup as he is secretly observed by the girl in the red dress.
Part 2
13	"reckless bra[V]ery"	Yoshiyuki Kumata	Ryōji Masuyama	Ryōji Masuyama	July 5, 2024	
2B and 9S are paired together again for a scouting mission, but 9S insists they help a Resistance soldier look for her lost friend, who is apparently a YoRHa android. They manage to find the YoRHa soldier's corpse and the Resistance soldier regains her memory, revealing that she is an E-type "Executioner" android designed to assassinate other androids suspected of betraying YoRHa. Feeling guilt over the countless androids she has killed, the executioner voluntarily falls off the side of a building to her death. 2B and 9S continue their scouting mission to a nearby shrine, where 2B calls off the mission before 9S can discover an android corpse identical to him. Later, at a shopping mall, the pair destroy a machine and encounter an Emil head which runs away when they consider attacking it. 2B then suddenly attacks and kills 9S, revealing that her true designation is 2E, an executioner unit as well. At the Bunker, the Commander, who ordered 2B to kill 9S for hacking the Bunker, hopes that this will be the last time 2B has to kill him, revealing she has killed 9S multiple times in the past. The Commander then exits the recording of events, showing that the events of this episode are a flashback also taking place in the past. In the present, the Commander then organizes YoRHa's forces in preparation for their final assault against the machines. Alternate Ending: 9S tries to get 2B to call him "Nines", but keeps getting interrupted by machines until he loses his temper and wipes them all out, preventing any peace between the two sides.
14	"mission [F]ailed"	Keisuke Shiraishi & Kōki Tomari	Ryōji Masuyama	Ryōji Masuyama	July 12, 2024	
With the revelation that the Aliens along with Adam and Eve are dead, leaving the machines in disarray, YoRHa commences a full scale assault on the machines to reclaim Earth. The Commander is authorized to use the full force of YoRHa's arsenal as well as loan advanced weaponry to the Resistance. Meanwhile, 9S, now deployed without 2B, leads his fellow Scanner androids in mass hacking the machines, supporting the YorHa combat units and Resistance forces who battle the machines. The battle initially goes well with YoRHa quickly seizing the upper hand. However, as the girls in the red dresses observe the Bunker, all of the YoRHa androids suddenly suffer a mass hacking attack that causes them to begin killing each other. Seeing that the operation has failed, the Resistance decides to withdraw back to their base while 9S tries to investigate the cause of the mass hacking and why he was apparently only mildly affected. He discovers that the YoRHa androids were infected due to a backdoor secretly installed in every android's data synchronization port, with 9S only being spared because he neglected to synch his data with the Bunker. Upon learning this, he then realizes that 2B is in danger. Alternate Ending: 2B and 9S discover a coliseum where machines are battling and defeat them. However, their victory attracts the attention of the "president" and "former president", who easily defeat YoRHa to the point of extinction.
15	"no [I] in team"	Yoshiyuki Kumata	Ryōji Masuyama	Kengo Matsumoto	July 19, 2024	
As 2B battles the machines, she recalls how YoRHa leadership knew humanity was already extinct long before the Aliens and machines arrived on Earth, but they covered up the fact so that the androids humanity left behind wouldn't lose morale or purpose. However, the Scanner androids, and 9S especially, are always bound to discover the truth, necessitating the Executioner androids like 2B to regularly murder them and modify their memories. 2B hopes that with the machines destroyed, she will no longer have to kill 9S. However, when the YoRHa falls victim to the virus, 2B and 9S are cornered by the machines and hacked YoRHa androids. They manage to upload themselves back to the Bunker, but find to their dismay that it has also fallen prey to the virus and is set to self destruct. The Commander, who has also been infected, orders 2B and 9S to evacuate and survive on Earth. As 2B and 9S head back down to Earth, the Bunker explodes and A2 watches the wreckage fall through the atmosphere. Alternate Ending: 9S and 2B hide in a locker to try to escape the infected YoRHa androids, only for 9S to discover he accidentally saved 3B instead. Meanwhile, 2B has been infected by the virus roams the ruins of Earth until her power fails.
16	"broken [W]ings"	Satsuki Takahashi	Yūsuke Watanabe	Satsuki Takahashi	July 26, 2024	
As 2B and 9S descend back to Earth, they are ambushed by a squadron of infected androids and separated before crash landing. 2B suffers heavy damage to her body and realizes she has been infected by the virus again. Not wanting to risk infecting 9S, she decides to try to get as far away from him as possible. 9S meanwhile tries to reunite with 2B but is delayed by machines getting in his way. During their respective journeys, 2B wonders why she was programmed to feel emotions when she is forced to suppress to them to carry out her mission, regretting all of the times she has had to kill 9S. 9S meanwhile comes to realize that he is in love with 2B. As 2B's infection reaches a critical level, she encounters A2. 2B bequeaths her sword to A2, which transfers all of her memories, as well. A2 then fatally stabs 2B to prevent her from being taken over by the virus and cuts her hair short again. 9S arrives just in time to witness A2 killing 2B, and misunderstanding the situation, swears to take revenge on her. The two androids are then separated when a massive tower suddenly emerges from the ground. 2B's Pod then decides to follow A2 and begins repairing her damaged memories. Alternate Ending: 9S plays a game of hide and seek with 2B, but cannot find her. He spends the next several decades searching for her, but 2B is never seen again.
17	"bad [J]udgment"	Toshimasa Ishii	Yūsuke Watanabe	Toshimasa Ishii	August 2, 2024	
2B's Pod proceeds to revive an unconscious A2, repairing her damaged memories in the process and triggering a flashback to her first mission as No. 2. After her squad's captain was killed during their arrival on Earth, A2 reluctantly assumed command of the remnants of the squad, insisting they take the injured androids with them. However, the wounded androids eventually succumbed to their wounds, and the squad ended up encountering Rose and Lily's Resistance squad. A2 successfully convinced them to join forces to destroy the local machine server. During their journey, A2 and Rose discussed the difficulties and pressures of being a leader. As A2 and the remnants of the allied team broke into the server room, the machines told them that YoRHa had been deliberately sending squads like theirs into suicide missions to gain combat data for future android models. Rose and the remaining androids then sacrificed themselves to destroy the server, leaving A2 and Lily as the sole survivors. In the present, A2 wakes up in the care of Pascal before losing consciousness again, reliving memories she voluntarily deleted where she promised Lily that both of their squads would always be together. Alternate Ending: Lily and Jackass lament the destruction of YoRHa and inadvertently drink contaminated alcohol, becoming infected with the virus and destroying a village of peaceful machines.
18	"chil[D]hood's end"	Kōsuke Madoka	Akira Kindaichi	Kōsuke Madoka	August 9, 2024	
A2 regains consciousness and is at first wary of Pascal and his machine village due to her distrust and hatred of the machines. However, Pod 042 assures her that she is safe and states that 2B ordered him to assist A2. Despite her hatred of machines, A2 decides to spare Pascal's village and tries to leave, but her motor functions fail due to damage to her fuel filter. A2 is forced to stay in the village for the time being and interacts with the village's machine children, growing a soft spot for them. Lily then arrives, having her first reunion with A2 since they were separated on their first mission. Meanwhile, 9S wakes up in the Resistance camp, having been cared for by the medical androids Devola and Popola. 9S leaves the camp on his own just as Lily brings A2 to get her fuel filter repaired. Lily then muses that despite her tough facade, A2 is still just as compassionate as she was when she was No. 2. Elsewhere, still in despair over 2B's death, 9S swears to take revenge on both the machines and A2. Alternate Ending: Pascal tries to teach the machine children about a secret the vending machines scattered around the city hold. In order to protect YoRHa's secrets, A2 begins destroying all of the vending machines.
19	"corru[P]tion"	Ryō Nakano, Kazuya Ishiguri & Masasa Itō	Yako Morimachi	Ryō Nakano, Masakazu Obara & Ryōji Masuyama	August 23, 2024	
9S attempts to enter the newly constructed Machine tower, but cannot breach the entrance. He is then attacked by Operator 21O, but despite being infected by the virus, she is unwilling to hurt 9S and commits suicide instead. In her last moments, she passes along data about the tower, revealing that it is powered by three sub-units, the destruction of which will render the tower defenseless. Armed with this knowledge, 9S makes his way to the nearest sub-unit. Meanwhile, A2 returns to Pascal's village to pick up supplies for the Resistance until Pod 042 warns them of an army of hostile Machines approaching. Pascal leaves to retrieve more weapons while A2 prepares to defend the village. At the coast, 9S enters the first sub-unit, the "Meat Locker", and in his rage, massacres all of the Machines inside despite them being non-hostile. The core to the Meat Locker is destroyed, but 9S remains consumed with rage. Alternate Ending: Devola and Popola attempt to have 9S listen to the "Song of the Ancients", but he ignores them. They then host the 666th episode of "Automata Shopping" but without 9S's assistance they are ambushed and killed by Machines.
20	"deb[U]nked"	Tōru Hamazaki	Akira Kindaichi	Takahiro Kawanami & Ryōji Masuyama	August 30, 2024	
The rogue Machines attack the village gates, and despite A2 and the villagers' best efforts, the gate is breached. Pascal then returns with his old weaponry and repels the first wave of attackers. However, the Machines attack with a surprise second wave that overwhelms the village's defenses. Most of the villagers are killed and A2 orders Pascal to evacuate to the Resistance Camp with the survivors while she holds off the Machines. She then tries to intercept an approaching Goliath, but cannot stop it even with her Berserker Mode. Pascal then arrives to assist with a commandeered Goliath body. Meanwhile, 9S reaches the second sub-unit, the "Soul Box". He hacks into the Soul Box's server and discovers files revealing that the Machine tower is actually a massive cannon, and that the Black Box technology YoRHa androids use is actually reverse engineered from Machine cores, making both YoRHa androids and Machines the same. Refusing to believe this information, 9S attacks the Soul Box's core but is reverse hacked. The core attempts to torment him by deleting his memories of 2B, but 9S manages to destroy the core in his rage. Alternate Ending: Pod 042 and 153 discuss how to handle the time management of the remaining episodes, and conclude that for the sake of time, the alternate ending segments will be discontinued from this point on.
21	"[N]o man's village"	Satoshi Saga	Yako Morimachi	Jun Shinohara & Ryōji Masuyama	September 6, 2024	
Pascal manages to destroy the enemy Goliath, but he and A2 receive a distress call from the Resistance Camp. Meanwhile, 9S reaches the third sub-unit, the "God Box", where he hears 2B's final message where she admits she enjoyed the time spent with 9S, considering it her "light". 9S destroys the God Box's core in a rage before falling unconscious. Shortly before the battle, Lily accepted the Machine children into the Resistance Camp to shelter them. However, one of the children was infected with a virus which rapidly spread through the entire camp, infecting almost the entire Resistance. Rather than flee, Lily rallies the few survivors to eliminate all of the infected Resistance fighters before they can escape the camp and infect more androids, though she orders Devola and Popola to evacuate. By the time A2 and Pascal arrive, Lily is the sole survivor of the Resistance but has been infected as well, forcing A2 to mercy kill her. Pascal checks on the children and is horrified to see that the infected child killed the others due to being overwhelmed by fear. Pascal self destructs in despair, destroying himself and the child. With all three sub-units disabled, the Machines announce that the Tower is now accessible and both 9S and A2 make their way towards it. Pods 042 and 153 then update each other on A2 and 9S's conditions and agree to continue sharing information with each other.
22	"just y[O]u and me"	Kazuki Yokoyama	Yūsuke Watanabe	Kazuki Yokoyama	September 13, 2024	
Devola and Popola recount the history of humanity, stating that after a dragon and giant fell to Earth, an incurable disease began to spread through humanity. In desperation, humanity initiated Project Gestalt to transfer their souls to new bodies. The process was overseen by the original Devola and Popola, but they failed to complete the project, resulting in humanity's extinction. As punishment, the android leadership programmed all Devola and Popola models to feel overwhelming guilt, and they were subsequently persecuted by other androids. In the present, 9S reaches the Tower and hacks the entrance to open it. He encounters a doppelganger of himself who reminds him of how 9S was killed multiple times by 2B, but with 2B gone, there is the possibility of a new ending. The door to the Tower opens and 9S is saved from a Machine attack by Devola and Popola, who perform some repairs on him and send him into the Tower while they hold off more Machines. Devola and Popola end up being critically damaged while 9S is forced to proceed through the Tower alone. Pod 153 warns Pod 042 about 9S's degrading mental state, but Pod 042 can only recommend that 9S try to get some rest and maintenance.
23	"meaningless [C]ode"	Isamu Yamaguchi, Takahiro Kawanami & Itsuki Sawada	Ryōji Masuyama	Isamu Yamaguchi & Ryōji Masuyama	September 20, 2024	
A2 arrives at the Tower to find that Popola has passed away from her wounds while Devola is infected with the virus. After mercy killing Devola, A2 enters the Tower. Inside, 9S encounters copies of 2B which he relentlessly attacks and destroys, but one of them self destructs, destroying one of his arms. 9S salvages a 2B copy's arm to replace his own, disregarding the risk of infection. Meanwhile, A2 enters a library where she learns that the Tower is actually a massive cannon designed to destroy the server on the moon containing humanity's data, and that Project YorHa was deliberately meant to fail so that the truth of humanity's extinction will never be discovered. The will of the Machine network observes everything that is happening, but encounters a conflict within itself where half of the network wants to prolong the battle against the androids to further their own evolution, while the other half wants to destroy the androids as quickly as possible and leave Earth to find a new planet to settle. The competing voices within the network then begin attacking each other until one side prevails. At the top of the Tower, A2 and 9S finally come face to face. 9S, now infected with the virus, refuses to listen to reason, and the two androids prepare to battle each other.
24	"the [E]nd of YoRHa"	Yoshiyuki Kumata, Kazuya Ishiguri & Ryōji Masuyama	Ryōji Masuyama	Ryōji Masuyama	September 27, 2024	
A2 and 9S battle each other, with A2 barely defeating 9S by cutting off his arm. However, 9S retaliates by hacking A2 and tries to break her will by taunting her with the memories of her lost friends and comrades. However, A2 recalls all the positive memories she had with them and declares that she was entrusted with their wills, so she will keep fighting. With Pod 042s assistance, she breaks the hacking, knocking out 9S. She is then approached by the will of the Machine Network, which explains that it has decided to end the conflict with the androids and change the Tower's purpose to launch an ark containing the memories of all Machines into space to find a new home. A2 initiates the launch, which destroys the Tower while Pods 042 and 153 carry 9S to safety. However, Project YoRHa enters its final phase to destroy all evidence of its existence. Pod 042 and Pod 153 decide to defy the project and sacrifice themselves to destroy the other Pods and rebuild 2B, 9S, and A2. 2B and 9S awaken and are happy to be reunited, while an unknown woman repairs an unconscious A2 and disappears.

== Recap special ==
No.	Title	Original release date
18.5	"Chapter.13–18 Survey Report"	August 16, 2024
A recap special covering episodes 13–18 of the series
