= 9S =

Video game character

YoRHa No.9 Type S
- Nier character
- Artwork by Akihiko Yoshida
- First game: Nier: Automata (2017)
- Created by: Yoko Taro
- Designed by: Akihiko Yoshida
- Voiced by: EN: Kyle McCarley; JA: Natsuki Hanae

YoRHa No.9 Type S (Japanese: ヨルハ九号S型, Hepburn: Yoruha Kyū-gō S-gata), commonly called 9S and informally "Nines", is a fictional character from the 2017 action role-playing game Nier: Automata developed by PlatinumGames and published by Square Enix. One of the game's three protagonists, 9S is a YoRHa squadron "Scanner" reconnaissance android known for his outgoing personality and his curiosity about the world and the machine lifeforms that inhabit it. Androids, created by humans, fight against the machine lifeforms, with the conflict turning into a prolonged proxy war. The latest addition to the android forces is YoRHa, an elite android fighting force based in the orbital Bunker and communicating directly with the Council of Humanity on the Moon. YoRHa models 9S and 2B are sent down as part of a reconnaissance force to investigate local machine behaviour and aid local Resistance forces.

9S was created by game designer Yoko Taro from the final moments of the video game Nier: Automata, setting him as an antagonistic, lonely warrior opposing the rebellious android A2 and then coming up with a new scenario that would explain his transformation from a kind android to such a broken-down character. He is voiced by Natsuki Hanae in Japanese and Kyle McCarley in English.

Critical response to 9S's character has been positive for his role in the story and relationship with 2B in both the game and the animated adaptation Nier: Automata Ver1.1a. He was also recognised by scholars as a more human character in the later parts of the game, where 9S is portrayed as establishing his own identity rather than being forced to fight for YoRHa.

== Appearances ==
First appearing in the 2017 video game Nier: Automata, 9S (short for YoRHa No.9 Type S) is a male "scanner" reconnaissance android who displays more emotion than other YoRHa units. After opening a route for future missions, they are sent to clear machine threats for Anemone's Resistance forces. During their missions, 2B and 9S discover the machines are replicating human societies and concepts. The two work with a pacifist machine group led by Pascal and battle Adam and Eve, physical manifestations of the machine network, who reveal that their creators were destroyed centuries ago. 2B and 9S also encounter A2, a rogue YoRHa android. The two protagonists manage to defeat Adam and Eve, but A2 escapes.

Following the machine network's defeat, a virus corrupts YoRHa units. A2 kills a corrupted 2B to take her place in front of a shocked 9S. Shortly afterwards, a tower created by the machines rises from the land to attack the Moon server, resulting in 9S and A2 both going there. During these events and their final confrontation, the two learn that YoRHa was designed to lose and perpetuate the myth of humanity, and that the machine network are using the war to further their evolution; each side has trapped the other in an eternal cycle of war. 9S—now insane and infected with the logic virus—challenges A2 to a fight, prompting the player to choose a character. Choosing A2 leads to her saving 9S and sacrificing herself to destroy the tower. Choosing 9S leads to both androids killing each other. Once both endings are unlocked, Pods 042 and 153 defy their orders to delete YoRHa's data, despite the possibility that 2B, 9S and A2 will repeat events.

A crossover with the mobile game SINoALICE (2017) depicted 9S and 2B as part of a story based around one of the game's boss characters, and PUBG: Battlegrounds (2017). He also reprises his Nier: Automata role in the anime series Nier: Automata Ver1.1a. The ending of the anime expands on the game, with both 9S and 2B restored to the world together, happily. Additionally, 9S has appeared in the Nier Reincarnation mobile phone role-playing game alongside 2B and A2.

== Conception ==
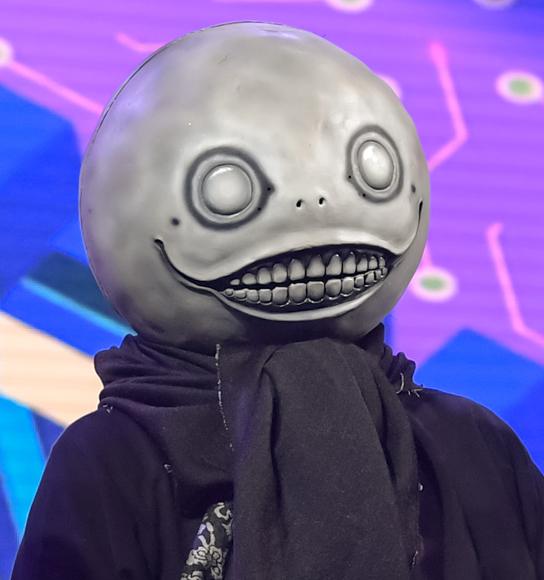
Nier: Automata director and writer Yoko Taro

Game designer Yoko Taro began creating Nier: Automata by starting from the final fight scene between the androids 9S and A2. He then envisioned the main storyline, including why they were fighting, and thus had to make people empathize with the characters. In developing the characters, Yoko Taro decided to portray 9S as broken and A2 as a more just fighter. Believing the gamers would not care for 9S's character, he kept writing the story to balance their stories and how they go from playable characters to mysterious and uncontrollable. In the end, Yoko Taro was glad about 9S's characterisation and external reactions to it. When it came to the main story, 9S and 2B were highly influenced by the television anime series Neon Genesis Evangelion.

In contrast to the darker narrative of Drakengard, Yoko decided that 2B and 9S deserved a happy ending, due to his belief that their experiences in Automata had "cleansed" the androids of their transgressions. Yoko considered the story of 2B was completed with Automata, believing the narrative should not be continued. However, for a later tribute concert, he wrote an audio play epilogue to Automata featuring 2B and 9S, a different method than the original Nier's epilogue, which is described in a game guide. In the case of Nier: Automata, Yoko Taro wants to make it obvious that 9S and 2B kill many enemies, and eventually kill each other over and over again. In that sense, Yoko Taro wants to think that they were both punished for the sins they committed. He then thought that the ending should be one that gives them a chance to cleanse their sins and a sense of hope. For the final boss battle, in which the player chooses between 9S and A2, the developers considered removing character abilities based on their choice but decided against it.

9S was designed by lead character artist Akihiko Yoshida, known for his work on Final Fantasy XII and Bravely Default. Yoshida was brought in following feedback on the original game's character designs and the original illustrator D.K's unavailability following an elbow injury. For his work, Yoshida was given a guideline of sleek black designs. 9S's early character designs were fairly consistent with his final appearance, outside of colour variations.

=== Voice acting ===
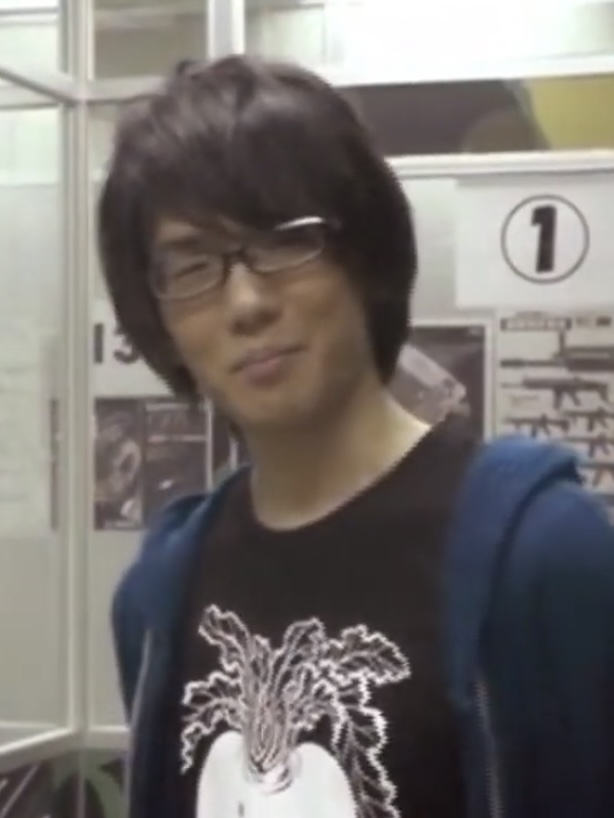
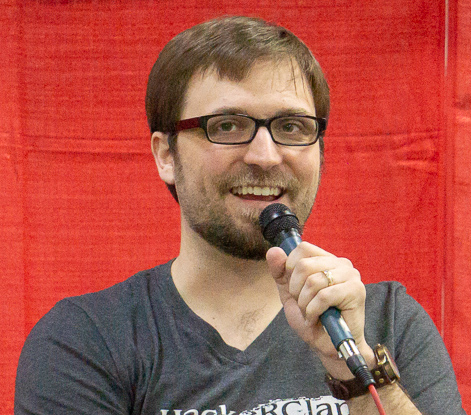
Natsuki Hanae (left) and Kyle McCarley (right) voice 9S in Japanese and English, respectively.

In Japanese, 9S is voiced by Natsuki Hanae, with producer Saito finding he was given a difficult job because he has too much dialogue to play. For the anime adaptation, 2B's actress Yui Ishikawa enjoyed her dynamic with Hanae due to the bond they share. Hanae found the anime unique for displaying a different take on the characters' handling compared to the original game.

The localisation company 8-4 found it challenging to translate the android dialogue, as it was difficult to balance their supposed lack of emotion with the truth of their highly emotional relationships and distinct personalities. Compared to 2B, localising 9S was easier as he was already written to be more emotive in the Japanese script. The team had notes on how to write each character; for example, 9S would speak about things at length, while 2B would be crisper.

In English, Kyle McCarley voices 9S and found his work in the anime to feel different from the game version, as early episodes foreshadow the development 9S is going to have in later parts of the narrative. He also highlighted that working for an anime despite it having the same story as the video game had different technical inputs. This was also affected by the COVID-19 pandemic. In retrospect, the voice actor found 9S similar to Alm in Fire Emblem but finds that the android is more similar to him. McCarley said that at the start of the game, his character had a happy-go-lucky personality but becomes corrupted after 2B's death, leading him to call 9S "emo Nines". While the game highlights that the YoRHa androids are not allowed to have emotions, 9S is always expressing himself. In regard to 9S's corruption, McCarley was assisted by John Ricciardi from 8-4 and was amazed by the story Yoko Taro shows in the game, regarding it as the first time he saw a work from the creator. He highly enjoyed 9S's and 2B's relationship, initially disliking the latter's cold treatment of the former until later scenes surprised him with plot twists.

== Critical reception ==
Game journalists have often commented on 9S's characterisation. Christopher Byrd from the Washington Post said that 9S's issue that vexes him the most is how machine life-forms like Jean-Paul are capable of higher-order thinking. His violent attitude can often be too much towards machines, but at the same time comes across as realistic and natural. Polygon regarded the player's actions as 9S as one of the biggest spoilers of the decade due to the different fighting style he employs compared to 2B, which gives the player a completely different perspective on the story. The website further noted that the ending of the game was shocking as the duo suffer horrible deaths, praising Yoko Taro's writing with regard to the execution. Because of 9S's arc from a friendly soldier to a revengeful renegade seeking to kill A2 after 2B's death, Paste Magazine regarded him as one of the best characters from 2017. In "NieR (De)Automata: Defamiliarization and the Poetic Revolution of NieR: Automata", Grace Gerrish from Boston College commented that 9S and 2B are free from YoRHa for the first time when the bunker is destroyed by the virus and start travelling around the world on their own will, establishing the trope of death of the author. This further gives the player freedom with the multiple endings they can reach from then on, especially with the ability to switch between androids.

There was also commentary focused on 9S's dynamic with 2B. Kyle Campbell of RPG Site felt 2B's death had a major impact on 9S due to his high reaction over while fighting impostors of his missing partner. Anthony John Agnello of The A.V. Club compared them Hamlet names which was indicative of Nier: Automata's commentary of existentialist themes as a result of their multiple deaths in the game and whether or not the two characters will revive in the end following the tragedy. Celia Lewis of The Escapist noted that the blindfold worn by 2B and 9S indicated how they come across as controlled figures who see the who are limited to a black and white view of the war. The duo's role in Nier: Automata Ver1.1a was praised for its fresh dynamic between 2B and 9S, the player's perspective constantly changing between them. In particular, GamesRadar enjoyed the fight 9S and 2B have against the machine Simone in the theatre, especially because of how the anime adapts 9S's hacking ability against the enemy and the next scene where 9S brutally kills two machines that gave up. Kotaku saw to 9S and 2B as caring figures sent by the council of humanity, further enhanced by the number of Machines they meet and help in sidequests, such as one who has questions for 9S about how they can make children while befriending them.
