= Nier Reincarnation =

2021 role-playing video game

- Official artwork for the first story arc
- Developer: Applibot
- Publisher: Square Enix
- Directors: Yoko Taro; Daichi Matsukawa
- Producers: Yuki Yokoyama; Daichi Matsukawa
- Artists: Shogo Matsuo; Akihiko Yoshida; Kazuma Koda
- Writers: Yuki Matsuo; Yuki Wada; Sotaro Hiroe; Yoko Taro
- Composers: Keiichi Okabe; Shotaro Seo; Kuniyuki Takahashi
- Series: Drakengard
- Engine: Unity
- Platforms: Android iOS
- Release: JP: February 18, 2021; WW: July 28, 2021
- Genre: Role-playing
- Mode: Single-player

Nier Reincarnation (Note: Stylized as NieR Re[in]carnation (Japanese: ニーア リィンカーネーション, Hepburn: Nīa Ryinkānēshon)) was a 2021 role-playing video game developed by Applibot and published by Square Enix for Android and iOS devices. The game is a sequel to Nier and Nier: Automata, forming part of the wider Drakengard series. Set in a realm called the Cage, the game followed the story arcs of multiple characters, each exploring their troubled pasts while manipulated by a greater outside threat. Gameplay was split between exploration within the Cage and narratives dubbed Weapon Stories, and turn-based battles against monsters infesting the Weapon Stories. The game was free-to-play, incorporating a gacha-based system for character variants and weapons.

Production began following the success of Nier: Automata (2017), with the aim of making an accessible mobile entry in the Nier universe. Series creator Yoko Taro acted as creative director. Other returning staff included artists Akihiko Yoshida and Kazuma Koda, and co-composer Keiichi Okabe. It began its release in 2021 in chapter form, and ended service worldwide on April 29, 2024. The game saw commercial success, reaching fifteen million downloads worldwide by September 2021. Journalists gave mixed reviews praising the writing, art design and music, while frequently criticizing the gacha system.

== Gameplay ==
A combat scene in Nier Reincarnation

Nier Reincarnation was a role-playing video game set in the same universe as Nier and its sequel Nier: Automata, taking place within an infinite area of towers dubbed the Cage. The game covered multiple story arcs of varying length following people within the Cage. The player, controlling different characters in each arc, navigated different areas of the Cage in the company of ghost-like companions, entering statues called Scarecrows and reliving memories which play out as storybook-like narratives.

The gameplay was split into three modes. The first followed the current protagonist exploring different areas of the Cage with their companion. Barricades and Scarecrows which trigger battles block their path; completing the Scarecrows grants and upgrades weapons related to new characters. In these memories, dubbed Weapon Stories, players experienced the memories of a weapon from a side-scrolling painting-like perspective, and enter battles to correct errors. Battles played out automatically in real-time with a party of three characters against enemies. Character-specific skills are triggered by tapping icons on-screen when they have charged.

Nier Reincarnation launched with a minigame where the player shoots at targets within a time limit. The shooter is locked to a horizontal axis, and being hit by projectiles from the targets will freeze them temporarily. The player is ranked based on points gained from defeating targets, impacting their reward. An alternate minigame was added post-launch which had players controlling the supporting character Mama in an autoscrolling side-scroller. The goal was to collect coins and items that grant buffs within a time limit, while avoiding obstacles and enemies which decrease the player's score. An Arena mode added post-launch allowed a player's party to fight parties created by other players, granting weapon and character enhancement rewards.

While the storyline characters were unlocked in-game from the outset, other character variations and weapons are obtained through a gacha mechanic. Storyline quests, when completed, had harder alternate versions which unlock new character variants and expand upon the stories. The player also had a strength statistic for their party members dubbed Force, with the party's Force needing to be a certain threshold to progress the story. The Force requirements were adjusted following the initial story arc.

== Synopsis ==
The Girl and the Monster

The first story arc follows the exploits of two characters exploring the Cage; Fio, a young girl who endures great suffering in the real world and finds solace in the Cage, and the dream-eating monster Levania. The story initially shows Levania in Fio's body after a body swap orchestrated by a ghost-like being dubbed "Carrier", with a similar being called "Mama" guiding Leviania to gain the power needed to reverse the body swap. Fio and Levania reverse the swap and confirm their friendship. Both are revealed to be weapons whose stories were being corrupted, with Mama saying more stories must be found.

The Sun and the Moon

The second story arc follows high school students Yuzuki Kurezome and Hina Akagi. Both are transported to the Cage from their world and guided by two new ghost-like beings dubbed "Mama" and "Papa", Yuzuki and Hina respectively restore the broken moon and sun. Their story reveals them to be siblings separated by their parents' divorce following a turbulent marriage. It is revealed each sibling killed the other's parent out of hatred; their wishes to revive their parents come into conflict. The default ending has a player-chosen sibling killing the other and transforming into a weapon. Replaying the final chapter unlocks an option where Hina and Yuzuki forgive each other, though they are trapped in the Cage.

The People and the World

The third story arc follows characters from previous arcs defending the disintegrating Cage from an enemy force. Escaping with the original Mama's help, the Cage is revealed to be a server on the moon set up after humanity's extinction in the events of Nier to preserve human history and alternate timelines emerging from branching events. Mama is one of the mechanical Pods who maintained the server with the android 10H, while Yuzuki and Hina were summoned by 10H from an alternate reality to protect the server due to a war between alien Machines and human-created androids, the end of which is depicted in Nier: Automata. Yuzuki and Hina seal the Cage and 10H sacrifices herself to allow them, together with Mama and the Cage residents, to escape to Earth.

On Earth, which is frozen in time, the group learn that attacks on the Cage were driven by an entity born from two merged artificial beings overwhelmed with loneliness: a quantum computer intelligence called Her, and an avatar of the Machine Network called the Red Girl. The entity seeks to end history, which it sees as bringing nothing but suffering, having sent Carrier to disrupt the stories and manipulated Yuzuki and Hina to open an attack path. Led by Fio and Levania, the Cage's residents fight the entity. Once defeated, time restarts and friendly Machines and androids are revived. Fio joins the restored Her in the real world to keep her company, with Levania promising to watch over Fio from the Cage. The Cage and the residents' stories are repaired, Yuzuki and Hina remain with an exact copy of 10H in the Cage, and Mama sends thanks to the player for helping.

== Development ==
After the success of Nier: Automata, the concept of a mobile title based on the Nier universe was pitched by series owner Square Enix to external developers, with the aim of creating a game that would bring in new casual players. Nier Reincarnation was developed by Applibot, a studio dedicated to mobile games. Series creator Yoko Taro acted as creative director. Applibot's Daichi Matsukawa acted as co-producer and co-director, while Yuki Yokoyama was the second co-producer. The team's aim was to make an ambitious title with 3D graphics comparable to a cross-platform title. This approach was partially intended to carry stronger appeal to Western players. It was also designed to carry over the established aesthetic and musical style of Nier. A development challenge was getting the game to work within different phone specifications. During production, it used the codename "Dark".

While the game is set within the same universe as the other Nier titles, Yoko wanted to separate the game from the others so it could be enjoyed by series newcomers. Matsukawa later stated that Yoko had not finalized the game's placement in the chronology of Nier beyond a rough outline. In contrast to the other Nier titles, the writing was handled a team of other writers, with Yoko's role being to take their ideas and create a coherent plot out of them. The writing team was led by Takashi Ohara, who worked based on suggestions from Yoko. Mama's companion role in the story was compared by Yoko to the Grimoires in Nier and the Pods in Automata. The multiple protagonists and story structure were based on the progression of Puzzle & Dragons.

The narrative structure was built around short stories to alleviate Yoko's frustration at needing to extend his earlier mobile game SINoALICE beyond its planned finale due to its popularity. The structure also meant he could end Nier Reincarnation early despite having an overall finale in mind. The first arc's storyline was written by Yuki Matsuo. The second arc was written by Yuki Wada based on a draft by Yoko, and during its early stages, the two leads' middle school days were going to be shown. The third arc was written by Sotaro Hiroe. Following the beta period, full voice acting for the story sections was still an unknown, but fan feedback persuaded the team to include full voice acting despite the technical difficulties.

An important element of Reincarnation's development was preserving the established art style and atmosphere of previous Nier titles. The initial main characters were designed by Akihiko Yoshida, while background and concept artwork was designed by Kazuma Koda. The lead character designer for the game was Shogo Matsuo. Character designs and artwork were handled by CyDesignation. The muted color palette was chosen as it fitted the overall aesthetic of the Nier universe. While the main game used 3D graphics, the Weapon Stories used a side-scrolling style with recitation-based narration based on kamishibai (紙芝居). Matsukawa originally wanted a static picture book presentation, with this instead being used for collaboration storylines. The characters for the second arc were designed under Yoshida's supervision, and the visual theme was "metal" as opposed to the natural style of the first arc. The leads were designed to contrast each other, using the series' recurring black and white color scheme with gold accents to unify them. Production of cinematics was supported by Kanaban Graphics.

The gameplay was designed to resemble a mode in Nier: Automata where players could equip chips which automatically performed some actions. Due to Matsukawa finding smartphone controls difficult to use, the interface was simplified by making battles turn-based. The shooting minigame, directly inspired by the hacking mechanic of Automata, was included at Matsukawa's insistence. Speaking about the gacha incorporation, Yoko stated that he understood the need for inclusion despite neither understanding the business end or partaking in those designs, but kept up active communication with the staff so he could create the game he wanted within those constraints.

Nier Reincarnation was built using the Unity game engine, with one of the concerns being to have character control be identical between the three different environments of the Cage, Weapon Stories, and battle. While using Unity caused some logistical issues, it also reduced development time as the team was working from the same toolset for the three environments. Character animations for the Cage sections, which were intended to be realistic, were hand-animated to ensure as little clipping or awkward movement as possible. A core part of the game design was enabling rapid transitions between different locations and into or out of battle, with the team using middleware tools to speed up processing and UI display. The 3D game assets were created using Maya, with the team creating common programming framework to ease asset and bug checking between Maya and the Unity environment. The Weapon Stories were created using mGear Framework, with the camera staying fixed to the side to create a 2D appearance.

=== Music ===
The music was primarily handled by Keiichi Okabe, lead composer for the other Nier titles. Okabe's contribution was around twenty songs, all original and not incorporating music from earlier Nier titles. Shotaro Seo also acted as composer, and co-arranger with Okabe. Due to being created for a mobile game, the music was made less dramatic than earlier home console entries, with a minimalist ambient style compared by Okabe to "diving into a spiritual world". On Yoko's request, each song covered a variety of styles while maintaining the established atmosphere of the Nier universe. The musical style was influenced by the game's "nostalgic" atmosphere, which was compared to a fairy tale atmosphere. Rather than having strong melodies, the music was designed to be "smooth". Vocals and chorus were handled by Kocho, Yukino Orita, Saki Ishii, and Seo. Vocals were restricted to Weapon Story and battle tracks.

For the second story arc, Okabe and Seo returned as composers and arrangers. The new music focused on strings and woodwinds to match the change to the story's atmosphere. Yoko requested a broader musical style for the second arc's score, with the instrumentation becoming less ambient and the battle theme incorporating electronica. For one story, they also created a new version of "Normandy", a theme created for a stage play related to Nier: Automata. Vocals were provided by Kocho, Seo, Orita, and Saki Nakae. The main theme, representing the two siblings, had a complex interplay of vocal parts between Orita and Seo. For the third arc, Okabe and Seo co-composed and arranged the music with Kuniyuki Takahashi. The vocals and chorus were provided by Orita, Nakae and Emi Evans.

== Release ==
The game was first announced in March 2020 alongside a remake of the original Nier, known as Nier Replicant ver.1.22474487139.... A closed beta test ran from July to August of that year. Pre-registration opened in September. Originally planned for 2020, its release was delayed by Square Enix into the first half of 2021. The game released in Japan on February 21, 2021. A Western release was announced alongside its pre-registration date. The game's UI was designed around that translation from the start, with a challenge being fitting English versions of the dialogue into the text boxes. The localization was handled by 8-4, which had handled the previous Nier titles. Localization was ongoing in February 2021, with the aim being to both translate and dub the game into English, and fix bugs in the Japanese version so it could be released in its best condition. The localization went through final adjustments in early May. It was released in English on July 28. Matsukawa stated the international version would be essentially identical to the Japanese release, with balance adjustments to the gacha system.

Alongside the main episodes, multiple collaborations with other games were released as limited time events. The game initially launched featuring a collaboration with Nier: Automata. Later collaborations included the 2021 Nier remake, Drakengard 3, Final Fantasy XIV, Persona 5 Royal, and SINoALICE. A Western-exclusive collaboration was a variant of recurring Nier: Automata character 2B.

A soundtrack album covering the first arc was released on April 21, 2021. An album of "chill" remix tracks was released on August 3, 2022. A second album covering The Sun and the Moon was released on July 19, 2023. A soundtrack album covering the final story arc is under consideration as of early 2024, and released on April 30, 2025. A novelization of the first story arc co-written by Yoko and Jun Eishima, NieR Reincarnation: The Girl and the Monster, was published by Square Enix on March 31, 2022. A companion book, NieR Reincarnation Material Collection, was released on August 28, 2024. It contains story summaries, artwork, and previously unreleased story content.

The first story arc ended in July 2021 with twelve episodes. The second story arc began releasing in October 2021. The second arc ran for six episodes until January 2023, with Matsukawa hinting that the next phase of the story would "undergo major changes." In February 2023, Applibot announced that future content updates would no longer feature an English language dub. The third arc began releasing in May 2023. The game ended worldwide service on April 29, 2024, with the third arc's closing chapter releasing on March 28. New characters and story content was included until the release of the final chapter. When asked during a livestream broadcast focusing on the game's ending, it was confirmed there were no plans for an offline version. In 2026 fans partially restored the game using private servers to create an unofficial "offline version". The project proved controversial due to legal and creative issues, prompting responses from Japanese developers who had worked on live service titles.

== Reception ==
Reception

Aggregate score
Aggregator	Score
Metacritic	58/100

Review scores
Publication	Score
Pocket Gamer	4/5
RPGFan	70/100
Siliconera	6/10
Android Central	2/5

On its day of release in Japan, Nier Reincarnation ranked as the fourth top-grossing app in the region, becoming the first within a few days. It passed ten million downloads in Japan by March 2021. When pre-registration opened for the Western release, it exceeded 300,000 applications. Following its Western release, Nier Reincarnation achieved fifteen million downloads worldwide by September 2021.

The narrative was positively received. Reviewing the initial release, Japanese website 4Gamer.net praised how the Weapon Stories expanded upon the narrative. RPGFan's Alana Henge enjoyed the contemplative nature of the game's story and its focus on memories, praising the weapon stories above the main narrative. Jason Guisao of Game Informer, while noting the use of complex terminology, praised the narrative's overarching theme of grief and atonement. Pocket Gamer's Shaun Walton praised the quality of both the main narrative and side content, and Rachel Kaser of Android Central enjoyed the Weapon Stories and praised the main narrative's pacing. Kazuma Hashimoto of Siliconera, while mixed on the game's other elements, was pulled in by the story and characters, similarly praising its theme of loss.

The art and environmental design saw praise. 4Gamer.net liked the immersive environmental design paired with the gameplay structure, while Henge said the music and environmental design added to the story's tone. Guisao lauded the art direction and character design, Hashimoto described the game as "beautiful" visually despite some unclear UI elements. and Kaser lauded the environmental design of the Cage and the quality of the game's graphics.

Responses to the gameplay design were more mixed. 4Gamer.net positively noted that using the gacha system was not required to experience the story. Guisao enjoyed the combat system and exploration, finding the gacha systems unobtrusive and praising the lack of explicit advertisement compared to other mobile games. In contrast with her praise elsewhere, Henge said she found playing the game to be a slog due to its shallow combat system and how the gacha system was implemented, further noting the presence of bugs and its high power requirements. Walton noted the gacha system's generosity compared to other mobile titles, and said he enjoyed the combat despite a lack of innovative elements. Hashimoto disliked the gacha system, feeling it blocked off progression and overly encouraged paying for progression; he further noted the encouragement of pay-to-win tactics in the Arena mode. Kaser was similarly negative, feeling the game's combat and other good elements were let down by its structure and gacha system.
