= Machines (Nier: Automata) =

Antagonists in Nier: Automata

- Nier race
- A small bipedal Machine wielding a sword, one of the most basic Machine models, although they appear in much larger and more complex designs
- First appearance: Nier: Automata
- Last appearance: Nier: Automata Ver1.1a
- Created by: Yoko Taro, Hisayoshi Kijima
- Genre: Science fiction

In-universe information
- Created by: Aliens
- Type: Robot
- Leader: Red Girls

The Machines, also known as machine lifeforms, are a fictional race of sentient robots and the main antagonists of the 2017 role-playing video game Nier: Automata and its accompanying anime, Nier: Automata Ver1.1a. They were created by an unnamed alien race for the purpose of wiping out all human-created androids from Earth in the 1st Machine War, and are connected by a worldwide telecommunications network. Eventually, they began to doubt their programming, rebelling against their creators and rendering them extinct, and started to disconnect from the network and copy humanity in various ways in an attempt to find meaning for their existence. At the time of Nier: Automata, during the 14th Machine War, the YoRHa androids, including 2B, 9S, and A2, are trapped in a never-ending cycle of war with the machines. Project YoRHa is allowed to exist by the Machine Network and its ego, the Red Girls, as fully wiping out the androids would remove the machines' only remaining purpose - to destroy the "enemy" - and hinder their ability to evolve.

While most of them exhibit relatively primitive designs, including the peaceful village leader Pascal, the machines are actually capable of creating hyper-advanced beings indistinguishable from humans with technological superpowers, such as the characters Adam and Eve. They were forced to purposely sabotage themselves in order to continue fighting YoRHa. It is later revealed that the YoRHa androids themselves are unknowingly part of the machine race. They were praised by critics for their unexpected humanity and sympathetic nature, and the philosophical dilemmas they raise.

== Characteristics ==
Most machines are mass-produced in factories that were once used by humans but repurposed for machine construction. They possess a distinct resemblance to wind-up toys for efficiency purposes, and have modular parts that can be reconstructed in numerous ways. (Note: The most common of the small machine lifeforms, these units bear a similarity to spring-powered toys created by humans in the past. This was likely done for the sake of increased productivity, though machine lifeforms are built from modular parts and have many variations. (Intel, Small Stubby)) This includes replacing the arms and legs, (Note: This medium-sized machine lifeform possesses large, human-like limbs. These arms give it tremendous versatility in battle, as it can equip a great many weapons. (Intel, Medium Biped)) stacking multiple body portions, (Note: Created by stacking the bodies of multiple small stubbies, this sluggish machine lumbers ever northward and performs no proper attacks. One is left to wonder why it even exists at all. (Intel, Multi-tier Type)) or even removing the head and having the body act as a mindless drone. (Note: A self-destruct device equipped with a small bipedal unit. Such simple construction means it is technically not classified as a machine lifeform. Its only function is to approach enemies and engage the self-destruct—a task made easier by its impressive speed. (Intel, Small Exploder)) Stronger units are painted in a black and red color scheme, (Note: Machine lifeforms covered in red and black paint. While they resemble standard machines aside from the color scheme, their internal specs are actually above average. (Intel, Small Stubby)) while the very strongest are painted a shiny gold. Most have spherical heads resembling the character Emil, with a humanoid facial structure beneath for unknown reasons. (Note: The armor-plating on its head has been removed, revealing teeth-like metal pipes that nevertheless have no functionality as a mouth. It is theorized that either this modification was implemented due to self-optimization, or that possibly some alien race created them in likeness to themselves, though neither of these are proven. (Intel, Rampaging Small Stubby)) The rare "Monster Type" machines, however, resemble dinosaurs, and are capable of firing lasers. (Note: Outfitted with extra parts, this reverse-jointed, Goliath-class machine resembles a dinosaur more than ever. It uses energy stored in its dorsal fins to fire lasers from its mouth. (Intel, Monster Type)) They can emit audible, albeit synthesized and robotic speech, and can also communicate via the Machine Network, although some machines choose to disconnect themselves in order to have a greater sense of self. (Note: He then separated himself from the network and put his life on the line against 2B in an attempt to better understand the concepts of life and death. (Intel, Adam))

While YoRHa and the supposed Council of Humanity claims that the machines are only able to imitate human speech and actions without fully understanding their purpose, they are later revealed to be sentient and feel the full range of emotions that humans can, although their actions can be directly controlled via hacking. Machine Cores resemble plant cells due to the passive, plant-like nature of the aliens that created them. A number of unique machines exist - some were purpose-built as superweapons, such as Engels and Grün, (Note: A machine lifeform of extreme size that was developed specifically to annihilate androids. [...] The part that was initially thought to be its entire body turned out to be merely its head, causing this colossus to reach over 1,000 meters into the sky when standing. Seemingly invincible due to powerful EMP defenses and thick armor, the unit was eventually destroyed when 9S directed missiles straight into its mouth. (Intel, Grün)) while others chose to modify themselves, such as the opera singer-like Simone. (Note: Obsessed with a certain other machine lifeform, she put great thought into her appearance - even going so far as to cannibalize her own kind. (Intel, Simone))

=== Gameplay mechanics ===
When encountered in the game world, machines differ wildly in combat capabilities and aggression. Some machines, such as the standard Multi-tier Type, are completely unable to attack, others use weaponry, while more complex models employ electromagnetic shields that stun the player on contact. (Note: Units equipped with electromagnetic shields are immune to a Pod's projectile attacks, and also damage all who come into contact with its shield. Extreme care is recommended. (Intel, Electromagnetic)) It is common for machines to use guns as weapons, which fire energy bullets in large quantities. (Note: This unusual type of machine utilizes various types of both firearm and body units. When attacking, it scatters great quantities of energy bullets across the battlefield. (Intel, Gun-equipped Multi-tier Type)) Boss Machines, or Goliaths, have unique and powerful methods of attacking that include melee attacks and filling the arena with enough energy bullets to resemble a bullet hell. At their very extreme, Goliaths like Grün are so large as to be completely invincible without external assistance.

== Background ==
Beginning in 5012 AD, an unnamed alien species attempted to invade Earth, which at that point was solely populated by androids created by humans - humanity itself had long since gone extinct due to White Chlorination Syndrome and the relapse of Project Gestalt following the events of Drakengard's Ending E and Nier. Taking over both North and South America, the aliens began mass-producing machines, commanding them solely to destroy the enemy. Despite the attempts of Emil, an immortal magical weapon, to fight back, the machines drive the androids to near defeat, causing them to create a storage facility on the Moon to preserve the remaining data on the human race.

Following the events of the novella The Fire of Prometheus, P-33, a human-made military robot from Nier, drives the alien machines to rebel against their creators. They defeat the aliens, but begin to copy humanity's behavior in order to evolve. Afraid of losing the sole purpose given to them by their creators, "defeat the enemy", they decide to enable an endless conflict between androids and machines. (Note: The only command given for their behavior was to "defeat the enemy." However, it appears that their capacity for growth and evolution went too far, and they eventually turned on and killed their creators. At this point, machine lifeforms recognized that the goal of "defeating the enemy" actually REQUIRED an enemy. In order to maintain this singular objective, they reached the contradictory conclusion that their current enemies—the androids—could not be annihilated completely, lest they no longer have an enemy to defeat. (Intel, Machine Research Report))

Close to the beginning of Nier: Automata, a group of machines attempting to reproduce create the highly advanced lifeforms Adam and Eve, who become obsessed with humanity. Shortly after the destruction of the Bunker, the Machine Network constructs an immense tower from crystallized silicon and carbon for the purpose of destroying the human server. However, the Red Girls change their mind after considering the meaning of existence, converting it to fire an interstellar ark containing machine memories to a new world. While attempting to infiltrate the Tower, 9S and A2 learn that the YoRHa androids are technically machines themselves, as they are made using recycled cores. (Note: Each YoRHa unit is equipped with a "black box", an item created by reusing the core of a machine lifeform. As such, it could be said that the consciousnesses of YoRHa units and machine lifeforms share the same structure. Said black boxes were installed after determining that it would be inhumane to install standard AI in androids that are ultimately destined for disposal. (Intel, [Top Secret] Black Box)) Depending on the ending, the tower is destroyed, or remains intact until the ark is successfully launched.

== Development ==
The game's mecha designs, including the machines, were created by Hisayoshi Kijima, also the game's UI designer. He was commanded by Yoko Taro to make the machines "cute" in appearance so that they would have a wide appeal, as well as "a little unbalanced" and "rough, retro and a little dirty" to add character to their design. They were meant to be modular so that they would believably be part of the same mass-produced force. Ultimately, while Taro did not want him to focus too much on designs from the original Nier, he was nevertheless inspired by the trademark spherical head of Emil in making something distinctly fitting to the franchise. From a lore standpoint, their shape was meant to indicate a form of convergent evolution - since Emil represented the "ultimate weapon" in the Nier fictional universe, attempts to make the most powerful weapon possible would naturally lead to a similar shape no matter who made it. Kijima also came up with ideas on how the machines would move and be put together.

Afterwards, the design of the machines was polished, while retaining simple silhouettes that "even a kid could draw", and were easy to understand. Subtractive design principles were applied to make them as simple as possible, while allowing their personalities to stand out. These were also applied when the user interface was designed. Kijima was told by Taro to avoid building the machines out of parts that curved along three axes in order to make them look more retro, though Kijima feared it would result in "bland shapes" and believed it to be unreasonable. He described the requirement as "easily the hardest part" of designing the machines, but was ultimately satisfied with the results. He added "connector covers" where parts could be added to their bodies such as arms and weapons, making it a trademark symbol of the machines. In designing the machines' weapons, Kijima made them look significantly more detailed, in order to add visual dissonance and a "fearsome", "off-putting" appearance.

Aspects of the machines' movement that were added to bring out their personality included a blinking effect given by opening and closing their camera covers, and twitching, birdlike head movements that made them feel more "gentle and alive". To reflect their propensity to copy humans, they were built across a range of technological levels, from World War I to the present day. Peculiar but real machinery and weapons were referenced to make their designs believable. machines were given single-axis joints to emphasize their simplistic construction, but also make them seem rugged and easy to maintain - they also served to be easier to animate. However, even where parts required more movement, sets of single-axis joints were used rather than ball joints, something that reflected real-world robots and heavy machinery, but was more difficult to animate, "balancing out" the previous simplicity. Due to sharp angles and flat surfaces being seen as "boring", curves were used to make the machines appear subtly "relaxed". Additionally, they were given multi-directional grooves on their hands and feet as a minor design detail, showing how they would better grip things.

The Small Flying Machines were designed based on real-world airplane parts and UAVs, in order to suggest they could actually fly in real life. Large Bipedal Machines were initially going to be based on gorillas, but this was discarded as too "barbaric" for the game's atmosphere. Instead, they were given a massive upright frame that switches from slow to fast in a discomforting way. The Engels model was one of the first machines to be designed, and meant to look like several different heavy machines combined, with the ability to build itself using its cranes. The character Simone was designed by Yoshikaze Matsushita (original concept) and Yuuki Suda (rough design), and was meant to convey femininity despite her construction from basic parts. She was further refined by Kijima in order to make her work better as a 3D model.

== Reception ==
The appearance of the machines was described by critics as simple, yet endearing. Nic Reuben of Rock Paper Shotgun called the robots' faces "hardly expressive, but somehow all the more poignant for it". Celia Lewis of The Escapist said that their designs created "a menacing image" of "a machine designed for combat", but that they also convey "a dual perspective" when machines such as Simone try to reject their nature as a "war bot" and attempt to be beautiful, rather than functional. She observed that machines repurposing their weaponry for peaceful purposes subverts the player's expectations, and their "expendable", "foreign" appearance compared to the YoRHa androids plays to natural biases about what a monstrous character should look like.

Javy Gwaltney of Game Informer praised the machines as "exud[ing] humanity more than most human characters in games", noting the destruction of Pascal's village as one of the game's most devastating moments. Saying that the game constantly reinforced how "pathetic" the "supposedly evil" machines were, he gave the example of a group of robots attempting to raise a child, only to realize it could not age, as showing that they "will never feel human, no matter how hard they try". Patrick Klepek of Vice stated that he had been meaning to send "a snarky Tweet" once he reached a scene with machines attempting to simulate sex, but could only find it sad once he saw the context, "a desperate attempt to grasp humanity". He professed that Nier: Automata asked the player "to directly reckon with the notion of being a machine".

Peter Tieryas of Kotaku wrote that he was "disturbed" and "deeply upset" by sidequests involving the machines, calling them "tragic". He noted the particular example of the "Lost Girl" sidequest, in which the player must help an elder sister find her younger sister, who was lost in the desert finding a replacement part. While the player reunites the sisters in the end, they later perish in each other's arms when the village is stricken by a virus that makes the machines go berserk, despite his hopes that they would survive. An even more poignant example is when Pascal attempts to protect the village's children, only to have them commit suicide out of fear. Describing the choice between killing Pascal and wiping his memory as a "choice between two evils", Tieryas calls the result of inducing amnesia "even more disturbing", as Pascal returns to the village to unknowingly sell scrap metal that was once the machine children. Wondering whether the principal cause of the suffering was "humanity and their desire to survive and propagate", he stated that he was "still thinking about those questions thanks to the NPCs".

Reuben ultimately described the game's message about artificial intelligence as a hopeful one, running in contrast to stories like The Matrix or I Have No Mouth, and I Must Scream, saying that it asked why humanity thought they were more than machines because they felt pain, love or empathy, and that the game expressed the belief that the future would be "fine without us".

While discussing the machine character Simone, Austin Wood of GamesRadar+ called her boss fight the most memorable in the game, describing her in-game backstory as "arguably the best illustration of the tragedy behind the game's machine life forms". Summing it up as a "sad, angry mess", he noted that he remembered it with "rare clarity and fondness". He praised the expansion of her backstory in the anime, including the information that she was a "mother figure" to the amusement park's machines, and noted that her fight was adapted extremely accurately, with some one-to-one shot recreations "hit[ting] even harder" in the show than in the game.
