= 2B =

Fictional character of the Drakengard series

- Nier character
- Artwork by Akihiko Yoshida
- First game: Nier: Automata (2017)
- Created by: Yoko Taro
- Designed by: Akihiko Yoshida
- Voiced by: EN: Kira Buckland; JA: Yui Ishikawa
- Motion capture: Kaori Kawabuchi

In-universe information
- Full name: YoRHa No. 2 Type B
- Race: Android

2B, (Note: Japanese: トゥービー, Hepburn: Tū Bī) full designation YoRHa No. 2 Type B, (Note: Japanese: ヨルハ二号B型, Hepburn: Yoruha Ni-gō B-gata) is a fictional android from the 2017 video game Nier: Automata, developed by PlatinumGames, published by Square Enix, and part of the Nier series of role-playing video games. One of the game's three protagonists, 2B is a soldier for YoRHa, an android task force fighting a proxy war with alien-created Machine Lifeforms. Her story arc focuses on her backstory within YoRHa, and her relationship with her partner 9S, a reconnaissance android. She is also featured in related media, such as the anime Nier: Automata Ver1.1a.

2B was created by Yoko Taro, director and lead writer of Nier: Automata, and designed by artist Akihiko Yoshida. The producer, Yosuke Saito, asked Yoshida to design a character who would be fun to cosplay. She is voiced by Yui Ishikawa in Japanese, and Kira Buckland in English; her motion capture actress is Kaori Kawabuchi.

Reception of the character has been generally positive, with some journalists noting her design as a prominent example of haute couture, while being controversial for its overt sexualization and fetish wear–like clothing. Her doll-like artificial beauty contrasts with the simplistic designs of the enemies she faces, a narrative element that is later subverted for dramatic effect. 2B is a popular character with series fans and has appeared in crossovers and merchandise.

== Appearances ==
=== Nier: Automata ===
2B, abbreviated from the designation YoRHa No. 2 Type B, is one of the three lead protagonists of Nier: Automata. She is presented as a "B" (Battler) combat android for YoRHa, a newly created squadron dedicated to reclaiming Earth from invading aliens and allowing humanity to return. The aliens created a vast robotic army – the Machines – as part of a prolonged proxy war. While classified as a "B" model, she is really a disguised "E" (Executioner) model. Her orders are to kill the scanner android 9S, deleting his memories, whenever he learns too much about the true purpose of the YoRHa project and the extinction of humanity – which she is completely aware of. Consequently, 2B is burdened by grief and guilt about her role, and tries to keep him at an emotional distance.

During the first two routes, 2B and 9S are sent to Earth to support the local android Resistance, and confront the threat of the Machines. They find Machines emulating human societies, and discover that the aliens were destroyed by their own creations. Soon after, the two are ambushed by Adam and Eve, humanoid Machines controlling the network. They also briefly fight A2, a prototype precursor to the 2B model who went rogue after her squad was left to die. During one machine attack, 9S is captured and tortured by Adam. 2B frees 9S, killing Adam in the process, but this drives Eve insane with grief. After killing the rampaging Eve, 2B is forced to kill 9S after he is infected with a logic virus, having a brief emotional breakdown. 9S's current version survives in the surrounding machine network.

Upon starting the third route, YoRHa launches an assault on the Machines following Adam and Eve's deaths, but succumbs to a logic virus attack that eventually infects 2B. Meeting A2, 2B uploads her memories into her sword and asks A2 to "take care of the future". 9S witnesses A2 mercy-killing 2B, misunderstanding the scene and swearing revenge on A2. The player then takes control of A2, who has absorbed 2B's memories, her personality having changed in the process. Following two alternate endings in which all three androids seem to have died, Pods 042 and 153 resolve to fight Project YoRHa, successfully restoring their data and bodies. Despite the possibility of events repeating themselves, the Pods hold faith that the three will create a new future.

=== Related media and crossovers ===
2B appears in two spin-off novels; the novelization Long Story Short, and the short story collection Short Story Long, both written by Yoko and Jun Eishima. 2B is also a lead character in the 2023 anime adaptation Nier: Automata Ver1.1a, which features an alternate story supervised by Yoko to fit the new medium. 2B was one of the characters featured in a crossover event with the mobile game Nier Reincarnation (2021). She is also represented in merchandise, including a life-sized figurine made by COCO, a Play Arts Kai figurine, a pop-up shop, a statue of the game's main cast, where she is shown alongside 9S and A2, shirts, and S.H. Figuarts NieR: Automata figures.

2B is a playable guest character in Bandai Namco's fighting game Soulcalibur VI (2018). The DLC featured a scenario around the character, themed moves and weapons, and an alternate white variation dubbed "2P". Given the inverted colour scheme of 2B when playing as a second player, the name "2P" was adopted as a play on being player two, and it sounding similar to 2B. Yoko Taro jokingly suggested the P stands for Panasonic. Before 2B joined Soulcalibur VI, she was considered for Tekken 7, but according to producer Katsuhiro Harada, it could have been different. 2B appeared alongside other Automata characters in a content patch in Shadowbringers, the third major expansion for Final Fantasy XIV. The scenario, titled YoRHa: Dark Apocalypse, was released in three parts, from 2019 to 2021. In 2024, 2B was added as DLC to the fighting game Granblue Fantasy Versus: Rising.

A crossover with the mobile game SINoALICE (2017) depicted 2B as part of a story based around one of the game's boss characters. She also appeared in a crossover with the third-party title Punishing: Gray Raven (2019). 2B's signature costume makes a cameo appearance in a number of third-party titles, such as Gravity Rush 2 (2017), PUBG: Battlegrounds (2017), Star Ocean: Anamnesis (2018), Phantasy Star Online 2 (2020), Fall Guys: Ultimate Knockout (2020), Babylon's Fall (2022), Tom Clancy's Rainbow Six Siege (2022), Goddess of Victory: Nikke (2023), Naraka: Bladepoint (2023), Stellar Blade (2024), The First Descendant (2025) and Overwatch (2026).

== Creation and design ==
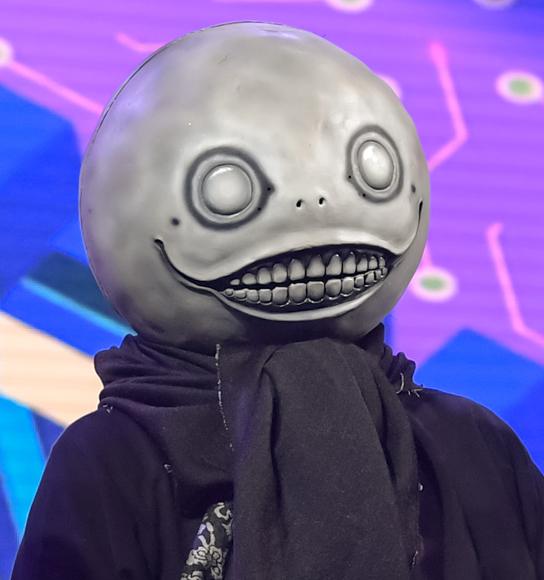
Director and story writer Yoko Taro, who wears an Emil mask in public appearances due to camera shyness

2B was created by Yoko Taro, director and story writer for Automata. The game's entire cast are either androids or alien-crafted machines, with the narrative focusing on the flaws of humanity through the actions of artificial beings who look up to them. In contrast to the original Nier which had different protagonists for the Japanese and Western releases, Yoko was given creative freedom to create a more traditional "delicate" female lead, catering to Japanese tastes. A female lead was decided on early on, with Yoko joking about discussing the addition of an elderly lead character. She was given a katana to add a fantasy element to the game's science fiction setting.

In contrast to the darker narrative of Drakengard, Yoko decided that 2B and 9S deserved a happy ending, due to his belief that their experiences in Automata had "cleansed" the androids of their transgressions. Yoko considers the story of 2B complete with Automata, believing the narrative should not be continued. However, for a later tribute concert, he wrote an audio play epilogue to Automata featuring 2B and 9S, a different method than the original Nier's epilogue, which is described in a game guide.

2B was designed by lead character artist Akihiko Yoshida, known for his work on Final Fantasy XII and Bravely Default. Yoshida was brought in following feedback on the original game's character designs and original illustrator D.K's unavailability following an elbow injury. Yoshida, who appreciated the chance to work on a game outside the fantasy genre, was given a guideline of sleek, black designs, and producer Yosuke Saito requested a design that would be enjoyable for cosplayers. Yoko wanted 2B to wear a blindfold, described in-game as a visor, as it had not been done with many game characters. 2B had some alternate designs, including one with long hair and another with a hooded top, though all maintained the same color and design aesthetic.

Gameplay designer Takahisa Taura had the image of a dancing woman in mind when designing the combat, making it more graceful than earlier PlatinumGames titles. He drew inspiration for 2B's fighting style from the titular protagonist of Battle Angel Alita. They differentiated 2B from Alita by adding an elegant and refined style to her movements. Hito Matsudaira designed her in-game 3D model based on Yoshida's concept art. He created the initial model in two weeks, drawing inspiration from the in-game characters of Yoshida's Final Fantasy XII designs. During later refinements, he added elements inspired by the "fragile [and] doll-like" qualities of the original Nier's in-game character models.

2B was featured prominently in the marketing for Nier: Automata. Localization company 8-4 found it challenging to translate the android dialogue, as it was difficult to balance their supposed lack of emotion with the truth of their highly emotional relationships and distinct personalities. While 9S was already written to be more emotive in Japanese, 2B had to be rewritten so she came off as "droll", rather than emotionless, in English. The team had notes about how to write each character; for example, 9S would speak about things at length, while 2B would be more crisp.

=== Portrayal ===
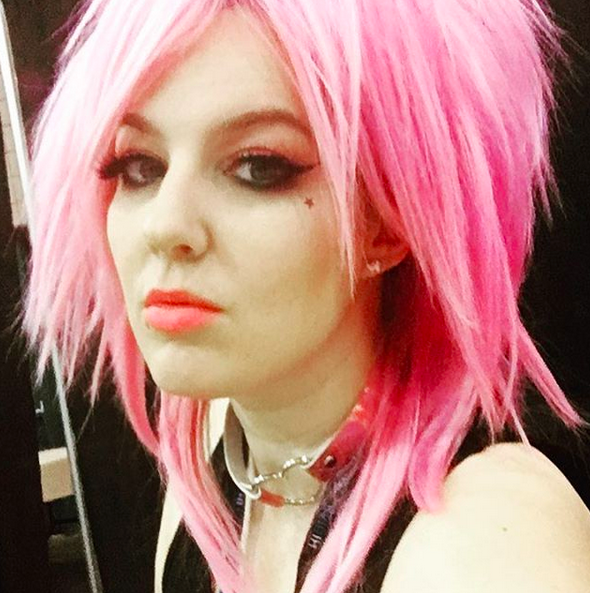
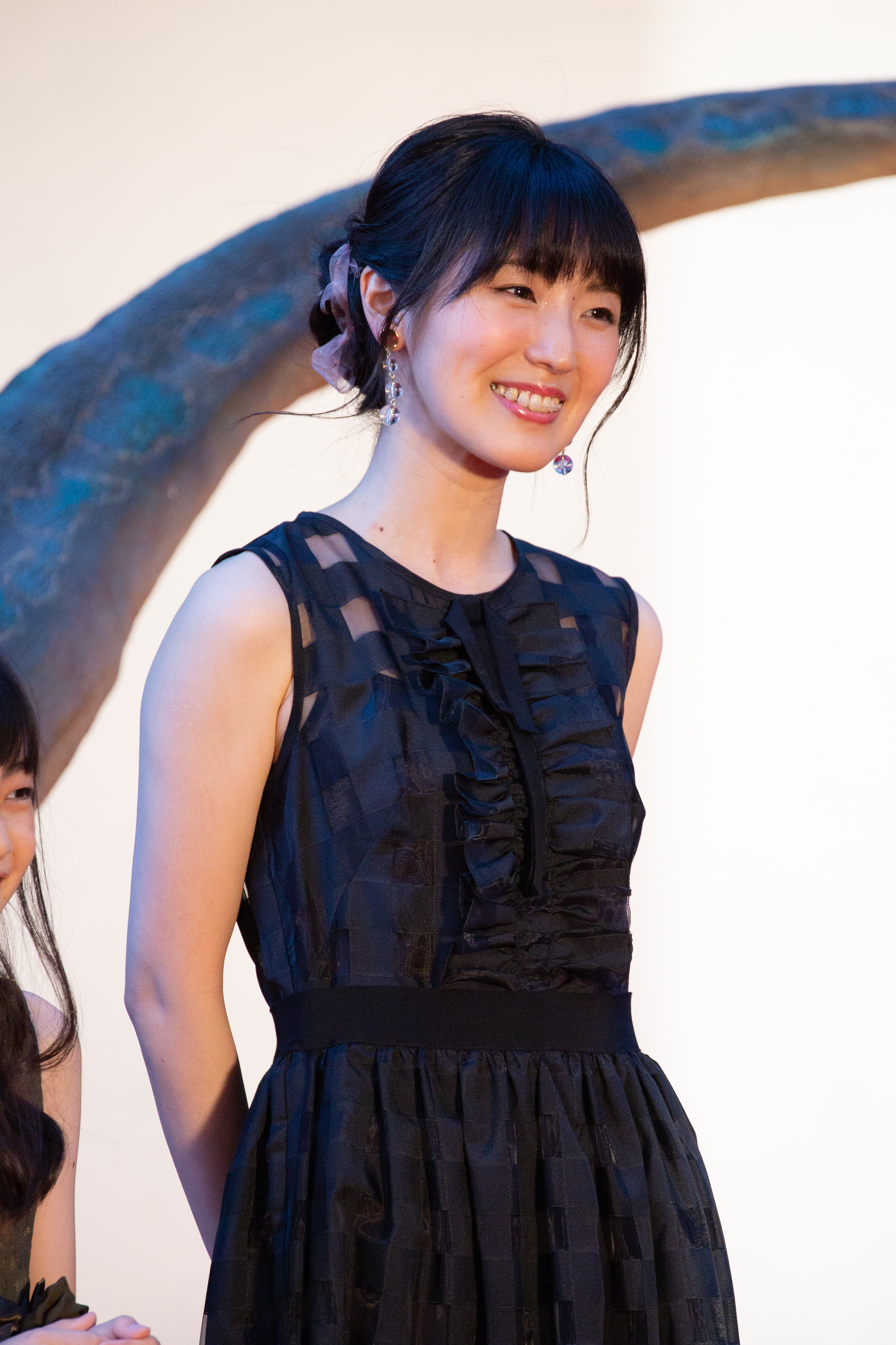
Kira Buckland (left) and Yui Ishikawa voice 2B in English and Japanese, respectively.

In all spoken appearances, 2B is voiced by Yui Ishikawa in Japanese and Kira Buckland in English. Ishikawa began her recording work for 2B before the in-game assets and cutscenes were finalized. Ishikawa played 2B as having a hidden emotional side under the enforced lack of emotion, with it coming out during her interactions with 9S. Ishikawa did not understand the full story during half the recording sessions, trusting in Yoko's direction for her performance. While generally playing her as cool and distant, 2B had moments of high emotion where Ishikawa could act out, though she was sometimes told to tone down her performance. Buckland found the role of 2B challenging, as she was used to playing more outgoing and emotional characters, while also showing care towards 9S. Buckland recorded her lines prior to her going into full-time voice acting. She used the Japanese version as a reference for her performance, even if individual lines were tonally different for the English version.

2B's motion capture was performed by Kaori Kawabuchi, who also performed A2 and voiced some characters in the game. Having begun her career in motion acting during the 2010s with the Final Fantasy series, she had first met Yoko working on Drakengard 3 (2013). The motion capture was done under Yoko's supervision, with Kawabuchi doing both voice lines and movements for the cutscenes. Her performance then acted as a guideline for Ishikawa's lines, with Kawabuchi matching her facial capture to the final recording. Kawabuchi recorded cutscene and battle actions separately, with more recording dedicated to animations between sword attacks.

== Reception ==
Jack Yarwood of Paste magazine called 2B one of 2017's best new characters, citing her character development and "endearing" relationship with 9S. Anthony John Agnello of The A.V. Club stated that her "Hamlet-sourced name" was indicative of Nier: Automata's "obsession with classic existentialist philosophy", noting that she was disturbed by her partner's repeated deaths and memory wipes. Kyle Campbell of RPG Site said that, while 2B first came across as stereotypical and hardened, her true personality was caring and loving. Calling her situation hopeless and tragic, he noted that the need for her to constantly kill 9S prompted her callous "act". He drew a contrast between 2B's "bottled-up" sadness and 9S's reaction at 2B's death, in which he "lets his emotions boil over" while fighting impostors of 2B. 2B's morals in her mission to face threats to mankind where compared to several other famous character like X from Mega Man X who is constantly hunting down enemies despite his doubts as well as Raiden from Metal Gear who often questions the nature of his missions and the cast from Blade Runner.

Celia Lewis of The Escapist noted that the blindfold worn by 2B was a "deviant design choice" that indicated her "inability to see the greater picture", its black color scheme showing how she was limited to a "black and white" view of the war. She also stated that 2B's beauty was "purely superficial", a piece of "visual design trickery" that makes the player believe she is different from her "ugly", "expendable" Machine counterparts. Kimberley Ballard of PC Gamer described 2B as a "draped and ruffled china doll", also noting her outfit's connection to fetish wear due to the "prevalence of blindfolds, collars and black materials". She called the androids of YoRHa fetish objects themselves, "created by humans not just to reclaim the Earth but also a kind of dominance," while also noting that her blindfold indicated the androids' total trust in their superiors.

2B's role in Nier: Automata Ver1.1a was praised for its fresh dynamic between 2B and 9S, the player's perspective constantly changing between them. Meanwhile, her inclusion in Soulcalibur was criticized by Kotaku for being a poor stylistic fit for the game's roster of characters. Polygon's Julia Lee noted the popularity of 2B's outfit as a Final Fantasy XIV in-game item.

2B's costume design was controversial with a subset of players, who called it both overly sexualized and impractical. Yoko, known for making games with unabashedly adult and sexual themes, was not swayed by the criticism. Prior to the game's release, a Twitter user posted a screenshot supposedly showing that 2B's in-game model had explicit details beneath her skirt. While later found to be a hoax, it prompted erotic fan art. In response, Yoko jokingly asked for the art to be collected and sent to him "in a Zip file", expressing surprise when fans complied with the request. In 2019, billionaire Elon Musk shared a fan-made portrait of 2B created by artist Meli Magali on Twitter, causing a widespread backlash amongst fans of the game when he refused to credit the artist; he later deleted the post.
