= Nier: Automata =

2017 video game

- Developer: PlatinumGames (Note: Additional production support and supervision by Square Enix. Become as Gods Edition ported to Microsoft Store by QLOC. The End of YoRHa Edition ported by Virtuos.)
- Publisher: Square Enix
- Director: Yoko Taro
- Producers: Eijiro Nishimura; Yosuke Saito
- Designers: Takahisa Taura; Isao Negishi
- Programmer: Ryo Onishi
- Artists: Akihiko Yoshida; Yuya Nagai; Toshiyuki Itahana
- Writers: Yoko Taro; Hana Kikuchi; Yoshiho Akabane
- Composers: Keiichi Okabe; Keigo Hoashi; Kuniyuki Takahashi
- Series: Drakengard; NieR
- Platforms: PlayStation 4; Windows; Xbox One; Nintendo Switch
- Release: PlayStation 4: JP: February 23, 2017; NA: March 7, 2017; PAL: March 10, 2017; Windows: WW: March 17, 2017; Xbox One: WW: June 26, 2018; Nintendo Switch: WW: October 6, 2022
- Genres: Action role-playing, hack and slash
- Mode: Single-player

Nier: Automata (Note: Stylized as NieR:Automata (Japanese: ニーア オートマタ, Hepburn: Nīa Ōtomata)) is a 2017 action role-playing game developed by PlatinumGames and published by Square Enix. It is the sequel to Nier (2010). Nier: Automata was originally released for the PlayStation 4 and Windows via Steam. It was ported to Xbox One in June 2018, and Nintendo Switch in October 2022.

Nier: Automata is set during a proxy war between alien-created Machines and human-crafted androids, focusing on the actions of combat android 2B, scanner android 9S, and rogue prototype A2. The story requires multiple playthroughs, with each playthrough revealing new story elements. The gameplay combines role-playing elements with action-based hack-and-slash combat. It also includes gameplay from other video game genres, with elements varying from shoot 'em up to text adventure.

Production began in 2014, with series creator Yoko Taro, producer Yosuke Saito, and lead composer Keiichi Okabe reprising their roles in Nier. Akihiko Yoshida, known for his work in the Final Fantasy series, led character design. The goal was to make a sequel that would be faithful to Nier while improving the combat system. Because the project was new to PlatinumGames, its staff faced multiple challenges when developing the gameplay and open-world environment. The story, written by Yoko, explores themes of finding value in life and the reasons people kill. Automata was localized by 8-4, translators of Nier. The game was formerly unveiled at E3 2015.

Nier Automata received widespread acclaim from critics who praised the game's story, themes, gameplay, music, visuals, and characters, with criticism directed at its presentation for some technical problems. The PC release drew a mixed response due to technical problems that were not addressed until 2021. The Nintendo Switch release was praised as one of the best third-party games on the system, although some reviewers criticized its downgraded graphics and frame-rate drops.

Since release, Nier: Automata has been widely considered to be one of the greatest video games of all time, and its soundtrack one of the greatest ever produced. In addition, the game was a commercial success, selling over 10 million copies worldwide as of February 2026. Automata's strong sales and reception were credited for saving its developer PlatinumGames, with the company prior to the game's release facing a severe financial crisis after several years of disappointing game releases. Nier Automata would receive stage plays and novels expanding its narrative, an anime adaptation, and both downloadable content (DLC) and crossovers with other games.

== Gameplay ==
Main character 2B in combat with machine enemies

Nier: Automata is an action role-playing game in which players explore an open world. In addition to standard navigation on foot, the game features scenarios with flying mech battles, as well as a special item that can summon wild animals to ride. Non-playable characters (NPCs) found throughout the world offer quest objectives, and shops in hub locations sell various items, including consumables that recover health.

Combat uses a real-time action-based hack and slash system, using both light and heavy attacks and combining them into different combination attacks. The player can also evade incoming attacks, gaining invulnerability or counterattack bonuses based on timing. The player is assisted by a flying "Pod" robot which launches customizable ranged attacks varying from simple gunfire to heavy-hitting hammer attacks. The first protagonist 2B alternates between two weapons, the second protagonist 9S combines light attacks with hacking into enemies, and the final protagonist A2 can sacrifice health to briefly boost her attack power. There are four classes of weapons available; short swords, long swords, bracers, and spears. Attacks with different weapon types can be charged and launched for increased damage.

Players earn experience points through combat, increasing their health, defense, and attack power. Character customization is handled through attribute-changing items called chips. Chips can alter the HUD, add new abilities, and grant status buffs to the player characters. The number of chips that can be installed at any one time is limited to the number of slots a character has. Chips can either be purchased at shops or collected from defeated enemies. If the player character dies, they respawn at their previous save point. The player character can then find their original body and either attempt to repair it or retrieve items and experience from it to gain a bonus. If the repair attempt is successful, the body is resurrected as a temporary ally, but if the attempt is unsuccessful, it becomes an enemy the player can fight. With online features enabled, the bodies of other players can also be retrieved or revived where they died.

At certain points, the gameplay changes to reflect different video game genres, such as shoot 'em up and text adventure segments; many of these are indicated by a shift from the normal third-person perspective to a top-down or side-scrolling view. Some areas also include platforming elements, requiring the player to jump between platforms or over obstacles. Automata has 26 different endings; five main endings lettered A to E, and 21 additional endings lettered F through Z. These additional endings, which act as game over events, are triggered by performing certain actions, failing to progress the narrative, or losing certain battles. There are four difficulties available to the player which can be changed at any time, with "Easy" giving access to chips which automate functions such as attacking, dodging and pod fire.

== Synopsis ==
=== Setting and characters ===
Nier: Automata, which shares the post-apocalyptic setting of Nier, takes place thousands of years after the original game's events. The Nier fictional universe exists in an alternative timeline within the Drakengard series. While carrying over the Drakengard tradition of a dark atmosphere and branching storylines, there is no direct narrative connection between Nier: Automata and the rest of the series. The story is set in 11945 AD, and revolves around a proxy war between the human-made androids and an invading army of alien-made Machines. Though they are prohibited from having emotions and lack true names, each android has a distinct personality. The "YoRHa" android forces are commanded from the Bunker, a reconnaissance base that orbits Earth. Fending off the Machines, the YoRHa forces fight alongside pre-YoRHa Earth androids known as the Resistance.

The game's initial protagonist is 2B (short for "YoRHa No. 2 Type B"), a YoRHa combat android whose main trait is her calm composure. 2B is accompanied by 9S (short for YoRHa No.9 Type S), a male "scanner" reconnaissance android who displays more emotion than other YoRHa units. The game later introduces another player character named A2, an obsolete attack android who often acts alone. The androids are supported by Pod 042 and Pod 153, floating, box-like robots that act as ranged weapons. The game's primary antagonists are Adam and Eve, twin controllers of the Machine Network; and the Red Girls, a construct within the Machine Network. Other characters include the Commander, YoRHa's top officer; the resistance leader Anemone; Pascal, a machine who dislikes conflict and wishes for peace; Devola and Popola, early androids who suffer discrimination from the actions of their model series; and the original Nier character Emil, who has lost his memories in the intervening years after the original game.

=== Plot ===
The story of Nier: Automata is told across multiple playthroughs and alternating character perspectives. The first and second playthroughs follow the respective viewpoints of 2B and 9S during the latest android strikes against the Machines. After opening a route for future missions, they are sent to clear machine threats for Anemone's Resistance forces. During their missions, 2B and 9S discover the Machines are replicating human societies and concepts. The two work with a pacifist machine group led by Pascal, and battle Adam and Eve, physical manifestations of the Machine Network who reveal their creators were destroyed centuries ago. (Note: Adam: The aliens you seek are no longer here. They were wiped out centuries ago ... By us. The machines. (Route A, Chapter 03: Adam and Eve)) 2B and 9S also encounter A2, a rogue YoRHa android. Adam is killed by 2B after he captures 9S. During his recuperation, 9S discovers a glitch in YoRHa's servers when syncing himself and 2B, and learns humanity was extinct long before the alien invasion. Humanity's last remnant is a Moon-based server holding their genetic remains. YoRHa perpetuates the myth of their survival to give the androids a reason for existing. (Note: Commander: In truth, humans never went to the moon at all. Any transmissions received from the moon are just dummy signals set up in advance. The only thing there is a small bit of data relating to the human genome. / 9S: But why would you— / Commander: Humans were already extinct when the aliens attacked ... No one fights without a reason. And we need a god worth dying for. (Route B, Chapter 9: Deranged Religion)) With Adam dead, Eve goes mad with grief and drives connected Machines into a frenzy. 2B and 9S kill Eve, but 9S becomes infected with Eve's logic virus, forcing 2B to kill him. 9S's consciousness survives within the local Machine Network.

The third playthrough begins as YoRHa launches a full-scale invasion. A logic virus attack, which is enabled by the glitch 9S previously discovered, corrupts every YoRHa unit except 2B and the restored 9S. (Note: Commander: But tell me—why weren't you infected? / 2B: I don't know! / 9S: It's probably because I deferred our data sync. I noticed some weird noise in the Bunker's server data, so I paused the upload. (Route C, Chapter 11: Full-scale Attack)) 2B and 9S are separated in the aftermath, and 2B is infected with the logic virus. A2 discovers 2B, who asks her to take her place. An ignorant 9S sees A2 mercy-killing 2B and swears revenge on her. Simultaneously, a tower created by the Machines rises from the land, separating the two before they can fight. A fortnight later, the perspective splits between A2 and 9S. A2, the survivor of a test run for YoRHa, begins empathising with the Machines; she witnesses the destruction of Pascal's village, then the village's "children" taking their own lives out of fear when they are attacked again. Pascal begs A2 to either wipe his memory or kill him; A2 can perform either task or leave him. An increasingly unbalanced 9S investigates the tower's resource-gathering platforms, fighting Machine remnants and learning the tower is designed to launch a missile at the Moon server. Devola and Popola sacrifice themselves to open the tower, with 9S and A2 both entering. During these events and their final confrontation, the two learn that YoRHa was designed to lose and perpetuate the myth of humanity, and that the Machine Network are using the war to further their evolution; each side has trapped the other in an eternal cycle of war. (Note: So then! To sum up: For hundreds of years, we've been fighting a network of machines with the ghost of humanity at its core. We've been living in a stupid ****ing world where we fight an endless war that we COULDN'T POSSIBLY LOSE, all for the sake of some Council of Humanity on the moon that doesn't even exist. (Intel - Archives - Machine Research Report)) A2 further learns that 2B's real designation was "2E", an "executioner" unit assigned to repeatedly kill 9S whenever he discovers the truth about humanity, and that 9S was aware of this. (Note: A2: The 9S type is a high-end model. They knew you'd discover the truth eventually. But the model designation "2B" was just a cover. The official designation...is "2E". Number 2, Type E. They were a special class of members designed to execute YoRHa units. But you knew that... Right, 9S? (Route C, Chapter 17: The Tower))

9S—now insane and infected with the logic virus—challenges A2 to a fight, prompting the player to choose a character. (Note: Pod 153: Proposal: Cease combat. Fighting her at this point would be irrational and— / 9S: Pod 153! I order you to halt all logical thought and speech! This order shall remain in effect until you confirm the death of either myself or unit A2! (Route C, Chapter 17: The Tower)) Choosing A2 leads to A2 saving 9S and sacrificing herself to destroy the tower. Choosing 9S leads to both androids killing each other; in his final moments, he is offered the option of joining with the now-peaceful Machine Network, as the tower has changed its function to launch an ark containing their memories. (Note: 9S: This tower is a colossal canon built to destroy the human server. Destroy it ... and rob the androids of their very foundation. That was the plan devised by those girls. But they changed their minds ... This tower doesn't fire artillery. It fires an ark. An ark containing memories of the foolish machine lifeforms. An ark that sends those memories to a new world. (Route C, Chapter 17: The Tower, Ending D)) Once both endings are unlocked, Pods 042 and 153 defy their orders to delete YoRHa's data, prompting the player to destroy the credits in a shoot 'em up section. Despite the possibility that 2B, 9S and A2 will repeat events, the Pods have faith they will forge a new future for themselves. (Note: Pod 153: Question, Pod 042. Did the data salvage restore all of their past memories? / Pod 042: Yes. / Pod 153: And are those recovered parts of the same design as previous ones? / Pod 042: Yes. / Pod 153: Then ... won't that simply lead us to the same conclusion as before? / Pod 042: I cannot deny the possibility. However, the possibility of another future also exists. (Route C, Ending E)) The player is then given the option to sacrifice their save data to help other players.

Returning characters Emil, Devola and Popola have separate optional story arcs. Devola and Popola were ostracized and programmed to feel endless guilt after their model series caused humanity's extinction in Nier. They stay at the Resistance camp doing the riskier jobs, and aid the YoRHa androids until helping 9S at the tower. Emil lost his memories due to copying himself to fight the aliens. A group of those copies, gone mad from losing their sense of self, act as a secret boss battle. After the current character wins the fight, Emil dies after remembering his now-dead friends. (Note: These colossal Emils were the sad final state of Emil's copies. Attacking without warning, they possessed the ability to unleash fierce attacks using magical weapons from the old world. At the end of this pitched battle, the true Emil stopped his dopplegangers [sic] with heartfelt words before annihilating them with a final strike. He then passed away with an expression of great relief, as if he had finally met the person he'd longed to see. (Intel - Unit Data - Emil Clones))

== Development ==
After the release of Nier, director Yoko Taro and Square Enix producer Yosuke Saito wanted to create a sequel. Saito spoke to assistant producer Yuki Yokoyama, who was unwilling due to low sales of Nier. After the positive fan reception of Nier, however, both Square Enix and the lead staff who worked on the original game were willing to continue the Nier intellectual property (IP) but wanted to create a better, more-action-oriented gameplay experience. They contacted PlatinumGames, which had developed a reputation for high-quality action games such as Bayonetta (2009) and Metal Gear Rising: Revengeance (2013). The two companies agreed to collaborate on the sequel, provided Yoko would be its director and that he would be present to help with production. The latter condition required Yoko to move from Tokyo to Osaka, where PlatinumGames was located. Although Yoko was initially uneasy about the collaboration, he became confident in PlatinumGames due to their excitement to work on a Nier game, and their promise to remain faithful to the original game. Designer Takahisa Taura also joined the team due to his long-time desire to create a Nier sequel. PlatinumGames handled primary development of the game while Square Enix supported the project with additional staff and sound design.

Initially, Yoko said they planned to build a FarmVille (2009)-inspired game for mobile platforms or the PlayStation Vita. The team instead shifted development to the PlayStation 4. Saito and Eijiro Nishimura co-produced the project. Development began in 2014, and included six months of pre-production. At first, the relationship between Yoko and PlatinumGames staff was fraught, mainly because Yoko's freelance status led to different daily schedules. To reduce the scheduling conflicts, the team organized a system of "free time" where Yoko would be available to work. The team studied feedback from both fans and critical reviews of Nier, and concluded they would need to improve the gameplay, graphics, and character designs. They also carried over aspects of Nier that were well-received, such as the game's music and complex story. PlatinumGames did most of the development at its offices in Osaka and Tokyo, and was supported by outside staff such as Yoko.

=== Scenario and themes ===
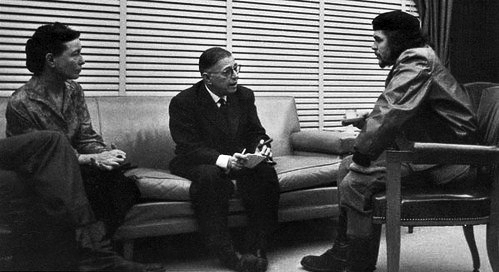
The narrative of Nier: Automata references numerous famous philosophers and names some Machine characters after them; cited examples are Simone de Beauvoir (left) and Jean-Paul Sartre (centre).

Yoko was the primary scenario writer. This script took the most work of all his games to date, and while the story only experienced minor changes through development, it was delivered nearly five months late. Yoko was supported by sub-writers Yoshiho Akabane from the company Highestar, and Hana Kikuchi, who worked on Nier and Drakengard 3 (2013). When creating Nier: Automata's story, Yoko was hesitant about adding Devola and Popola due to their role in the original game but he later decided to include them. According to Yoko, while the scenario of Nier is "wet" in its emotional content, he wanted Nier: Automata to have a "dry" narrative about confronting prejudice and unfairness in the world. He also wanted to leave more room for the player to interpret the story, feeling he had gone too far when humanizing the antagonists of Nier, and decided to strike a different balance in the sequel. According to Saito, a lot of time and effort went into creating the story and character interactions so they would match those of Nier.

As with the original Nier, multiple endings were created, but the conditions for reaching them were not as stringent as the first game. Yoko's desire was to make the game's conclusion happy, which prompted skepticism from other staff members. The happy ending from Yoko's perspective was the fifth and final ending, which he only created after the character motivations logically led him to the concept. The final ending featured a shooting sequence where the player fought their way through the closing credits, which symbolized the characters breaking out of a known system to find the hope of a new future. The team also included the option for player to sacrifice their save data to aid other random players in the closing credit sequence, a mechanic similar to that of the original Nier. This ability for players to help each other was inspired by a Coca-Cola campaign, where drink machines in India were connected via livestream to machines in Pakistan, encouraging the two peoples to overcome their political rivalry. The campaign made a strong impression on Yoko, who adapted the idea into in-game messages of encouragement from players across the world.

The team defined the game's central theme as "agaku", a Japanese word meaning "to struggle out of a bad situation". Saito also said the story is about love, which he felt was unusual for a story about robots, which are typically written as non-emotional. Yoko used the androids' and Machines' reverence for the long-extinct humanity to show how people's sense of self and worth is necessarily founded on belief in something else. The negative influence of human history on the factions reflect Yoko's views on people continuing to fight and create boundaries between themselves despite their advancement. A recurring element in Yoko's earlier work is his examination of reasons people kill and the impact of killing on others—this stems from his observation of people coming to enjoy killing enemies in games, which suggested to him something is wrong or missing inside them. Yoko said the narrative's darkness reflects the inherent darkness of reality. The narrative references numerous influential philosophers and thinkers, with Machine characters taking notable names such as supporting character Pascal (Blaise Pascal), boss character Simone (Simone de Beauvoir), and NPC Jean-Paul (Jean-Paul Sartre). Yoko used books by Will Buckingham and Nigel Benson, which explain philosophy and psychology in understandable language, as a reference for the narrative.

=== Art and game design ===
Nier: Automata was Taura's first role-playing game (RPG), with his prior experience focused on action game development. Taura managed the action-combat system and designer Isao Negishi created the RPG elements. According to Negishi and lead programmer Ryo Onishi, creating a game that was faithful to Nier was difficult and required a change from the style of their earlier titles. For the combat system, the team took the systems used in Nier and blended in elements from other titles by PlatinumGames. Taura's main design goal was to improve the combat system over that of the original and weave it into the story. The basic battle system was completed in two months, then expanded and adjusted during development. While designing the game's RPG elements, the staff at PlatinumGames were partially inspired by The Witcher 3: Wild Hunt (2015), including the high standard of its sidequests. The sections of Nier: Automata in which the perspective shifts to a side-scrolling perspective were inspired by the Castlevania series, of which Taura was a fan. For the final boss battle in which the player chooses between 9S and A2, the developers considered removing character abilities based on their choice but decided against it.

To make Nier: Automata beginner-friendly, the perspective was designed to automatically assume "comfortable" angles during combat. Also to this end, the developers included mechanics that would allow both casual and experienced action gamers to enjoy the game. It was the studio's first attempt at an open world; while its previous titles had used a story-driven linear structure, Nier: Automata has large environments that are linked with seamless transitions. Negishi noted the lower concentration of enemies in the world compared to those of earlier PlatinumGame titles, a necessity due to the game's open nature. By including fewer enemies, the team gave players the opportunity to "enjoy the still beauty of the game's desolate world". The developers based the shooting elements on bullet hell games, and decided combat should include multiple camera perspectives. The plug-in chips are an updated version of the Words used in Nier, and are themed around the premise of androids. The developers also suggested including multiplayer modes but this suggestion was not developed beyond the concept phase.

Using feedback about the game's original character designs, Akihiko Yoshida was engaged as main character designer. Saito originally wanted to bring back D.K, the character designer of Nier, but D.K had broken his elbow and was unable to draw, so he recommended Yoshida for the post. The developers thought Yoshida would be too busy to contribute, but he was willing to join the project due to fans of Nier working at his company, CyDesignation. Yoshida joined the company later in the character design process, so Taro gave him a general guideline of sleek designs with black as the dominant color. PlatinumGames staff had difficulty making the character models seem "alive" due to their mechanical nature. Unlike Nier, which has two different protagonist designs for different markets, the team committed to a high-quality JRPG character design that would be consistent across regions. According to staff, Yoshida's art design ensured a consistent aesthetic for the characters. The Commander, Adam, and Eve were designed by Yuya Nagai. Square Enix artist Toshiyuki Itahana redesigned Devola and Popola. Concept art for the game's enemies was handled by Hisayoshi Kijima, while Kazuma Koda, Yasuyuki Kaji, and Shohei Kameoka made the environmental artwork in collaboration with Yoko. The developers worked to build settings that would resemble real-world places players would visit.

=== Music and sound design ===
Composer Keiichi Okabe, who worked on both Nier and Drakengard 3, worked on Nier: Automata as lead composer with other members of his studio band Monaca; Keigo Hoashi, Kuniyuki Takahashi, and Kakeru Ishihama. The score, which was influenced by classical music, recalls elements of Nier such as that game's sense of melancholy. Whereas Nier is built around grasslands and villages, Nier: Automata includes a more mechanical and brutal environment, which is reflected in the musical score. Okabe created a score with a more-open world in mind, composing songs that segue into each other depending on situation and environment. The music was balanced using the digital audio workstation (DAW) Pro Tools.

Emi Evans provided vocals for the soundtrack, as she had done for Nier's soundtrack. Shotaro Seo provided additional male vocals. Nami Nakagawa, Evans, and J'Nique Nicole formed a three-part chorus for some of the music, including the game's boss theme. Several songs from the Nier soundtrack were adapted for Nier: Automata. Different versions of the theme song "Weight of the World" were performed by Nicole, Evans and Marina Kawano. The final ending's version had the development team performing the chorus.

Masato Shindo was the game's sound designer. Creating an echo effect was difficult due to the scale of the open world; Shindo designed a system that would manage echoes in real time, depending on the player's surroundings. Sound was implemented by Masami Ueda; it was a greater amount of work than he had experienced on previous projects. Ueda's previous encounters and good working relationship with Okabe helped the smooth implementation of the game's sound.

The soundtrack album of Nier: Automata was released on March 29, 2017. The first-print copies of the soundtrack include an additional sixteen-track album subtitled Hacking Tracks that contains musical variations for hacking segments.

=== Localization ===
The company 8-4, which had localized Nier, also localized the English-language version of Nier: Automata. According to Yoko, 8-4 changed elements of the script for each region because some of the concepts in the Japanese script are difficult to understand if directly translated. The aim was to create a script that would appeal to players around the world. Because 8-4 had worked with Yoko on Nier and Drakengard 3, they were familiar with his writing style and found it easy to ask for clarification during translation. 8-4's biggest challenge was translating the android dialogue, as it was difficult to balance their purported emotionlessness with their highly emotional relationships and distinct personalities. While 9S was already written to be more emotive in Japanese, 2B had to be rewritten so she appears "droll" rather than emotionless in English.

The development team had notes about how to write each character; for example 9S would speak about things at length while 2B would be crisper. The team also made decisions around using regional accents to altering voice types. A cited instance of the latter was changing a character's high-pitched child voice to a more mature one to avoid annoyance to players. The team researched the game's philosophical themes to avoid mistakes in their writing. According to Yoko, due to the estate of philosopher Jean-Paul Sartre's strict attitude towards copyright, Square Enix advised him to rename the character Sartre in releases outside of Japan; Yoko chose Jean-Paul as a replacement. Cup of Tea Productions, which had worked on both Nier and Drakengard 3, handled English dubbing.

== Release ==
In January 2014, after the release of Drakengard 3, Yoko expressed an interest in making a second spin-off from the Drakengard series but did not specify whether it would be related to Nier. In December of that year, he confirmed he was working on a new game but did not reveal more details. Nier: Automata was first announced at Square Enix's press conference at E3 2015 under the provisional title Nier New Project, with staff later confirming it was 10% complete. At the 2015 Paris Games Week trade show, Square Enix announced the game's official title and a provisional release date, and showed a gameplay trailer. Square Enix worked with Japanese rock band Amazarashi, lead singer Hiromu Akita was a fan of Nier, to produce a promotional song called "Inochi ni Fusawashii", which was inspired by the game's world. Yoko supervised the music video for "Inochi ni Fusawashii".

Yoko originally wanted to call the game "Nier: Android" but Square Enix rejected that title due to a possible trademark conflict with Google's Android operating system. In trailers, the events surrounding 2B's fate and A2 replacing her in the story were obscured by using A2's early-game model for some footage when she is short-haired in-game. To mitigate competition, the team decided to delay Nier: Automata until late-2016 or early 2017, which also allowed the team more time to refine the game. Yoko appreciated having more time for the team to finish the game.

Nier: Automata was released in Japan on February 23, 2017, coming in both standard editions and a Black Box Collector's Edition. The PS4 version was released in North America on March 7; and in Europe, Australia, and New Zealand on March 10. It also had a limited Day One edition, and a version of the Black Box Collector's Edition. The game was notably review-bombed in April 2017 by Chinese players demanding a translation of the game to Chinese.

=== Ports and additional content ===
Nier: Automata was released for Windows personal computers (PCs) through Steam on March 17, 2017. Both Square Enix and PlatinumGames were concerned about potential piracy of the PC version, which was expected to delay its release. In response to unaddressed graphical and performance issues with the port, an unofficial patch was created by fans. An official patch correcting these issues was released in July 2021. Saito stated that the release of a version for Xbox One was being considered, but later said it would not be developed due to low Xbox hardware sales in Japan and the wish to focus on a single console. An Xbox One version was later released worldwide on June 26, 2018; this version was subtitled Become as Gods Edition, with QLOC porting this version to Windows for the Microsoft Store and Xbox Game Pass on March 18, 2021.

A Nintendo Switch port was released on October 6, 2022. Saito requested a Switch port to celebrate of the game's fifth anniversary after being impressed by Astral Chain (2019), which Taura directed. The port's developer Virtuos wanted to preserve as much of the game as possible but capped the frame rate at 30 fps and made a racing-based side quest less difficult. Saito was comfortable with the reduced frame rate due to Astral Chain's combat working at that frame rate. Sound compression was a challenge; the team optimized the sound and graphics engine to allow the highest-quality transfer onto the Switch's less-powerful hardware. The game's developers made scene-by-scene comparisons to ensure the final product was as close as possible to the other console versions. At Yoko's request, more costumes and items were included, some themed after the mobile game Nier Reincarnation. The port's subtitle references the game's final ending.

A downloadable content (DLC) pack titled 3C3C1D119440927 was released on May 2, 2017; it includes additional costumes and accessories based on Nier, aesthetic hair-customization options, new battle colosseums, and boss fights with Square Enix and PlatinumGames presidents Yosuke Matsuda and Kenichi Sato. The content was unlocked in-game from the chapter-selection screen, and requires data saved from a completed playthrough. The DLC was included in the Xbox One and Nintendo Switch releases, and in the Game of the YoRHa Edition, which was released for the PlayStation 4 and Windows on February 26, 2019.

== Reception ==
Reception

Aggregate score
Aggregator	Score
Metacritic	PS4: 88/100; PC: 84/100; XONE: 90/100; NS: 89/100

Review scores
Publication	Score
Destructoid	9/10
Electronic Gaming Monthly	8.5/10
Eurogamer	Recommended
Famitsu	39/40
Game Informer	7.75/10
GameSpot	9/10
GamesRadar+	4.5/5
IGN	8.9/10
Nintendo Life	9/10
Nintendo World Report	10/10
PC Gamer (US)	79/100
Polygon	8/10

The original PS4 release of Nier: Automata received "generally favorable reviews" on review aggregator Metacritic based on 107 critic reviews. The PC version also received favorable reviews based on 14 reviews. The Xbox One version received "universal acclaim", earning a score of 90 from 30 reviews. The Switch port also garnered favorable reviews, earning a score of 89 based on 35 reviews.

Japanese gaming magazine Famitsu gave Nier: Automata a near-perfect score, lauding most aspects of it including the themes and gameplay. Janine Hawkins of Polygon lauded the game's sense of scale and willingness to make players feel small. Nintendo World Report's Melanie Zawodniak, giving the game a perfect score, described it as one of the best games ever made due to its narrative and gameplay design. Mollie Patterson, writing for Electronic Gaming Monthly, praised it as a highly enjoyable experience, both as a player and reviewer. Destructoid's Chris Carter lauded the title as a competent blend of action game and RPG. GamesRadar+'s Sam Prell was enthusiastic about the game's narrative, blend of gameplay genres, and overall quality. Sullivan called Nier: Automata "a crazy, beautiful, and highly entertaining journey full of nutty ideas and awesome gameplay".

Miguel Concepcion of GameSpot praised most of the game's elements, referring to its gameplay as "the closest thing there is to a spiritual successor to Metal Gear Rising: Revengeance". Matulef called Nier: Automata "the most captivating game I've played in ages" despite rough edges. Thomas Whitehead, writing for Nintendo Life, was positive about its presentation and design but noted some gameplay elements did not work as expected and lack depth. Game Informer reviewer Joe Juba wrote a lot of enjoyable elements in the game's narrative and gameplay are obscured by confusing or obtuse mechanics. PC Gamer's Andy Kelly was positive about the game but criticized the PC port for its graphical and technical issues at release.

The story and narrative themes were met with praise, though some reviewers found its pacing and presentation lacking. Both Meghan Sullivan of IGN and Eurogamer's Jeffrey Matulef found it difficult to relate to the android protagonists. Reviewers generally enjoyed the gameplay, but several critics felt that the combat lacked depth compared to previous PlatinumGames titles. The game's visuals were generally praised despite comments regarding occasional poor environment quality or visual spectacle. Recurring complaints arose from technical issues such as graphical pop-in, frame-rate drops, and long loading times. The game's music received unanimous acclaim. The Switch version was named as one of the best third-party ports to the system, despite reviewers noting some expected performance issues and downgraded graphics.

Nier: Automata has been considered to be one of the greatest video games ever made, appearing on numerous "Best of" lists.

=== Sales ===
Nier: Automata sold over 198,500 copies during its first week of release in Japan, peaking at number one in the charts and significantly exceeding sales of Nier in 2010. In April 2017, Nier: Automata was reported to have sold over 500,000 copies in Japan and Asia, including both physical shipments and downloads. According to the NPD Group report for March 2017, the game reached ninth place in overall sales and sixth place in the PS4 chart. In the United Kingdom, the game debuted at number six in the general software chart. By May 2017, sales of the game's physical and download versions on PS4 and PC had reached 1.5 million copies. The majority of sales during that period came from overseas, and its success came as a surprise compared to the low sales of Nier. By May 2019, Nier: Automata had reached worldwide shipments of four million copies, with an additional 500,000 units selling by March 2020; the latter was attributed to steady sales of the "Game of the YoRHa" edition. As of February 2026, all versions of NieR: Automata have sold over ten million copies worldwide.

=== Accolades ===
Accolades received by Nier Automata
Year	Award	Category	Result	Ref.
2017	35th Annual Golden Joystick Awards	Best Storytelling	Nominated	
2017	35th Annual Golden Joystick Awards	PlayStation Game of the Year	Nominated	
2017	The Game Awards 2017	Best Score/Music	Won	
2017	The Game Awards 2017	Best Narrative	Nominated	
2017	The Game Awards 2017	Best Role Playing Game	Nominated	
2017	NAVGTR	Camera Direction in a Game Engine	Won	
2017	NAVGTR	Original Dramatic Score, Franchise	Won	
2017	NAVGTR	Game of the Year	Nominated	
2017	NAVGTR	Game Design, Franchise	Nominated	
2017	NAVGTR	Character Design	Nominated	
2017	NAVGTR	Writing in a Drama	Nominated	
2017	Japan Game Awards	Award for Excellence	Won	
2018				
2018	British Academy Games Awards	Game Design	Nominated	
2018	British Academy Games Awards	Game Innovation	Nominated	
2018	21st Annual D.I.C.E. Awards	Role-Playing Game of the Year	Won	
2018	SXSW Gaming Awards	Excellence in Technical Achievement	Won	
2018	SXSW Gaming Awards	Excellence in Musical Score	Won	
2018	Game Developers Choice Awards	Game of the Year	Nominated	
2018	Game Developers Choice Awards	Audience Award	Won	
2018	Game Developers Choice Awards	Best Audio	Nominated	
2018	Game Developers Choice Awards	Best Design	Nominated	
2018	36th Annual Golden Joystick Awards	Xbox Game of the Year	Nominated	

== Additional media ==
During Nier: Automata's six-month pre-production period, Yoko created a musical stage play called YoRHa, which was performed in 2014. Set in the same universe as Nier: Automata, it acts as a backstory for the characters A2 and Anemone. While the stage play predates the revelation of Nier: Automata, the play's writer Asakusa Kaoru stated it would not exist without Yoko's vision for the world of Nier: Automata. Yoko created the basic scenario while Kaoru wrote the script. For later productions, Yoko revised Asakusa's script to simplify the plot. He described the play as a spin-off of the overall universe. The team worked on additional stage productions including an all-male spin-off, a musical version, and a revised version of the original.

Multiple novels based on the in-game universe were written by Yoko and Jun Eishima, a regular collaborator for supplementary material related to the Drakengard series. The Black Box Collector's Edition included a novella retelling the events of Nier from the perspectives of characters Devola and Popola. Long Story Short is a novelization of the game's main events with additional commentary from the characters through monologues. Short Story Long is a compilation of earlier short stories in the Nier continuity, along with new stories related to the characters of Nier: Automata. These two novels were published in North America by Viz Media. YoRHa Boys, which is based on the male spin-off stage play, was written by Eishima and supervised by Yoko; it follows a group of male YoRHa units that are put into an experiment to collect behavioral data.

The stage play was adapted into a manga called YoRHa Pearl Harbor Descent Record, which began serialization on Square Enix's Manga UP! online manga service. Megumu Soramichi illustrated the manga and Yoko supervised the story. Square Enix published the first volume of the manga in North America on December 13, 2022. During the fifth anniversary livestream of Nier: Automata, an anime television series based on the game was announced. It is produced by Square Enix and Aniplex, and animated by A-1 Pictures. The series, entitled Ver1.1a, ran from 2023 to 2024 split across two cours.

=== Crossovers ===
In October 2018, 2B was announced as a playable guest character DLC for Bandai Namco's fighting game Soulcalibur VI. Released on December 19, the DLC includes unique weapons and abilities, and an alternative white variation called "2P". Due to the inverted color scheme of 2B when playing as a second player, the name "2P" was adopted as a wordplay on "player two". Yoko Taro suggested the "P" stands for Panasonic. Characters from Nier: Automata were incorporated into a content patch for Final Fantasy XIV: Shadowbringers. The scenario, which is titled YoRHa: Dark Apocalypse, was outlined by Yoko and given to other writers. The three episodes of YoRHa: Dark Apocalypse are "The Copied Factory", "The Puppets' Bunker", and "The Tower at Paradigm’s Breach". DLC costumes and promotional appearances based on the characters of Nier: Automata have also appeared in multiple third-party console and mobile games.

== Legacy ==
Nier: Automata greatly exceeded Square Enix's sales expectations, and made them consider Nier as a franchise. PlatinumGames cited the strong sales, in addition to the positive critical reception, as saving the company and renewing interest in their products after several disappointing game releases.

A fan project to translate the graphics of Nier: Automata to Vulkan was started by Philip Rebohle in 2017 to get the game running smoothly on Linux. His success in January 2018 led to the offer of a contract with Valve, as it became apparent that his Vulkan interface could be used more broadly to run games on Linux. The project evolved into DXVK and is today integral to Proton, Valve's compatibility layer used to play Windows games on the Steam Deck and Steam Machine, as well as more generally for Steam games on Linux.
