= Nier: Automata Ver1.1a =

Japanese anime television series

- Key visual featuring YoRHa No.2 Type B
- Created by: PlatinumGames; Square Enix
- Anime television series
- Directed by: Ryōji Masuyama
- Produced by: Miho Matsumoto; Tomoko Fujimura
- Written by: Ryōji Masuyama; Yoko Taro
- Music by: Monaca
- Studio: A-1 Pictures
- Licensed by: NA: Aniplex of America; SA/SEA: Medialink
- Original network: Tokyo MX, GYT, GTV, BS11
- Original run: January 8, 2023 – September 27, 2024
- Episodes: 24
- icon

Nier: Automata Ver1.1a (Note: Stylized as NieR:Automata Ver1.1a) is a Japanese anime television series directed by Ryōji Masuyama, co-written by Masuyama and Yoko Taro, and composed by music studio Monaca. Based on the 2017 action role-playing game Nier: Automata developed by PlatinumGames and published by Square Enix, the anime is produced by A-1 Pictures. Set in the far future during a proxy war between alien-created Machine Lifeforms and human-crafted androids, the story primarily focuses on 2B and 9S, soldiers for the elite YoRHa combat force who become involved with the latest conflict against the Machine Lifeforms.

Yoko, who directed and co-wrote the original game, collaborated with Masuyama on adapting the story into a form that would work in an anime. Monaca, who worked on the game's music, returned to both arrange earlier pieces and create original music. The opening and ending themes were provided respectively by Aimer and Amazarashi. The game's original Japanese and English cast reprised their roles. The series was announced in a 5th anniversary livestream, and was broadcast from January to July 2023. Its broadcast had been delayed twice due to the COVID-19 pandemic impacting production. A second cours aired from July to September 2024.

== Premise ==
Nier: Automata Ver1.1a is set in the year 11945 on a post-apocalyptic Earth abandoned by humanity. Earth has been occupied by aliens, who fight using an army of Machine Lifeforms. Androids, created by humans, fight against the Machine Lifeforms, with the conflict turning into a prolonged proxy war. The latest addition to the android forces is YoRHa, an elite android fighting force based in the orbital Bunker and communicating directly with the Council of Humanity on the Moon. YoRHa models 2B and 9S are sent down as part of a reconnaissance force to investigate local Machine behaviour and aid local Resistance forces. During their time on Earth, 2B and 9S suppress hostile Machine Lifeforms, coming into contact with other characters who exist on the world. These include the local Resistance leader Lily; Devola and Popola, a pair of ancient android twins; Pascal, the pacifist leader of a non-hostile Machine collective; Adam and Eve, twin humanoid avatars of the Machine Network; A2, a rogue YoRHa member; and Emil, a being around whom Pascal formed his village.

== Characters ==
YoRHa No.2 Type B (ヨルハ二号B型, Yoruha Ni-gō B-gata)
Voiced by: Yui Ishikawa (Japanese); Kira Buckland (English)
Commonly called 2B, is a YoRHa squadron "Battler" combat model. She is defined by her cool and taciturn personality. She is also known as "2E", an "executioner" model created to kill other androids.
YoRHa No.9 Type S (ヨルハ九号S型, Yoruha Kyū-gō S-gata)
Voiced by: Natsuki Hanae (Japanese); Kyle McCarley (English)
Commonly called 9S and informally "Nines", is a YoRHa squadron "Scanner" reconnaissance model known for his outgoing personality and curiosity about the world and the Machine Lifeforms.
Pod 042 (ポッド042, Poddo 042) & Pod 153 (ポッド153, Poddo 153)
Voiced by: Hiroki Yasumoto (Pod 042), Kaoru Akiyama (Pod 153) (Japanese); D. C. Douglas (Pod 042), Abby Trott (Pod 153) (English)
Floating box-like devices which support the YoRHa forces. While initially robotic, the two also develop distinct personality and become attached to their charges.
YoRHa Type A No.2 (ヨルハA型二号, Yoruha A-gata ni-gō)
Voiced by: Ayaka Suwa (Japanese); Cherami Leigh (English)
Commonly called A2, is a YoRHa prototype. Initially sent as part of a disposable test run on a mission to destroy a Machine server at Ka'ala, she survives and pursues a vendetta against both YoRHa and the Machine Lifeforms.
Commander (司令官, Shireikan)
Voiced by: Chiaki Kanou (Japanese); Colleen O'Shaughnessey (English)
2B and 9S's superior officer. She is the leader of the YoRHa forces based in the orbital Bunker.
Operator 6O (オペレーター6O, Operētā 6O) and Operator 21O (オペレーター21O, Operētā 21O)
Voiced by: Keiko Isobe (Operator 6O), Meari Hatsumi (Operator 21O) (Japanese); Cassandra Lee Morris (Operator 6O), Connor Kelly-Eiding (Operator 21O) (English)
Two of the Operators who act as contacts at the Bunker for 2B and 9S respectively. They have contrasting personalities; while Operator 6O is friendly and wants to bond with 2B, Operator 21O is cold and focused on the mission over 9S's attempts to socialise with her.
Lily (リリィ, Rirī)
Voiced by: Atsumi Tanezaki (Japanese); Erica Mendez (English)
The leader of the local android Resistance. Initially mistrustful of YoRHa, she provides information and support. She is also a former acquaintance of A2, having served with her during their first mission. Lily was previously featured in additional material related to Nier Automata, and fills a similar role to game character Anemone.
Adam (アダム, Adamu) & Eve (イヴ, Ivu)
Voiced by: Daisuke Namikawa (Adam), Tatsuhisa Suzuki (Eve) (Japanese); Greg Chun (Adam), Ray Chase (Eve) (English)
Twin humanoid Machine Lifeforms which manage the Network. While Adam appears more mature and is fascinated with humanity, Eve is more playful and devoted to his brother.
Pascal (パスカル, Pasukaru)
Voiced by: Aoi Yūki (Japanese); Alexis Tipton (English)
The pacifist leader of a Machine Lifeform village which disconnected from the Machine Network and isolate themselves from the war.
Devola (デボル, Deboru) & Popola (ポポル, Poporu)
Voiced by: Ryoko Shiraishi (Japanese); Eden Riegel (English)
Twin androids of an ancient model series. Due to a devastating incident caused by another pair of their models, Devola and Popola suffer discrimination from other androids and are assigned dangerous jobs.
Emil (エミール, Emīru)
A being around whom Pascal formed his village after contact with Emil broke him from the Network. Emil was originally a human before being modified into a weapon and surviving on Earth for thousands of years.

== Production ==
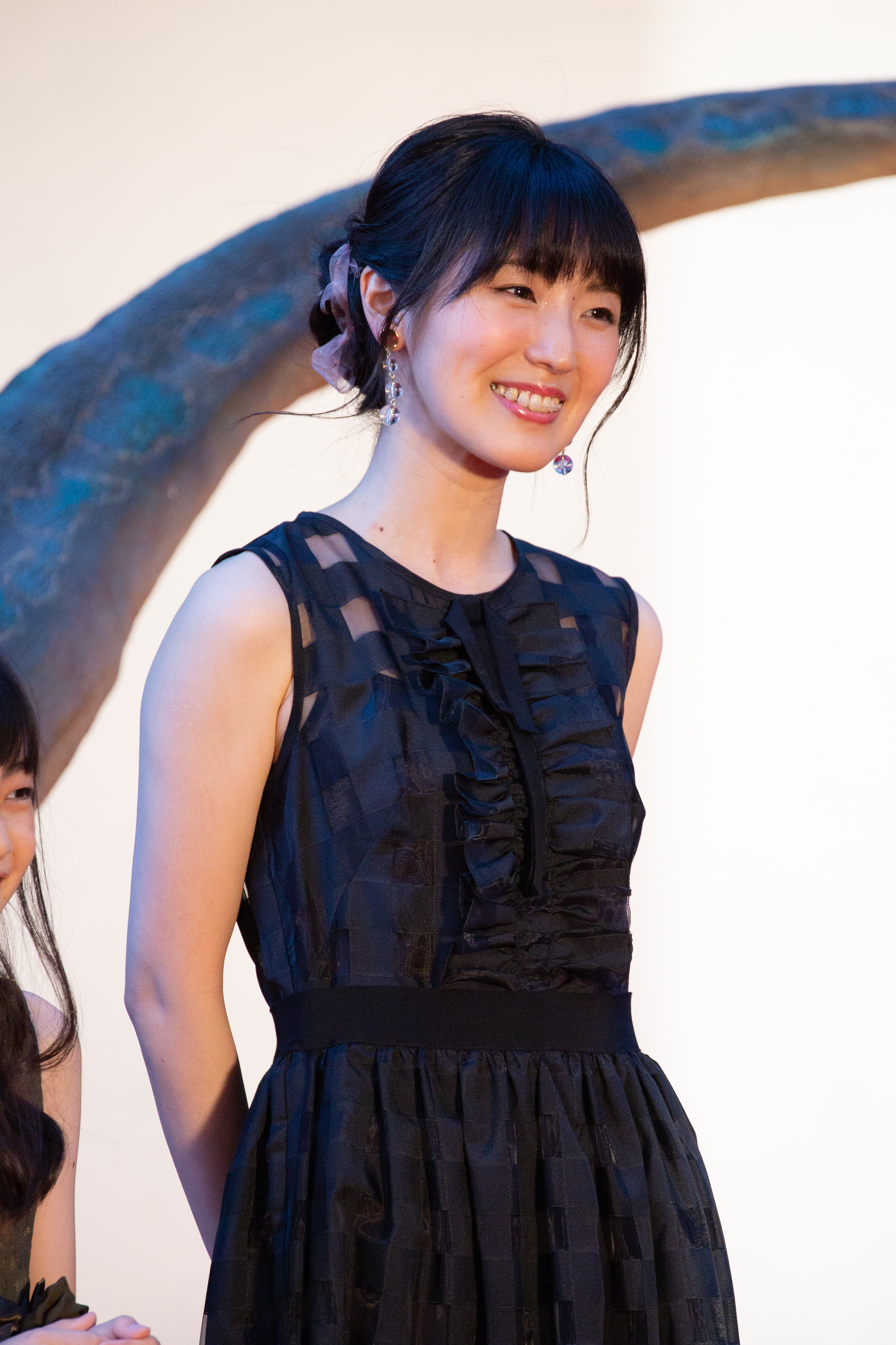
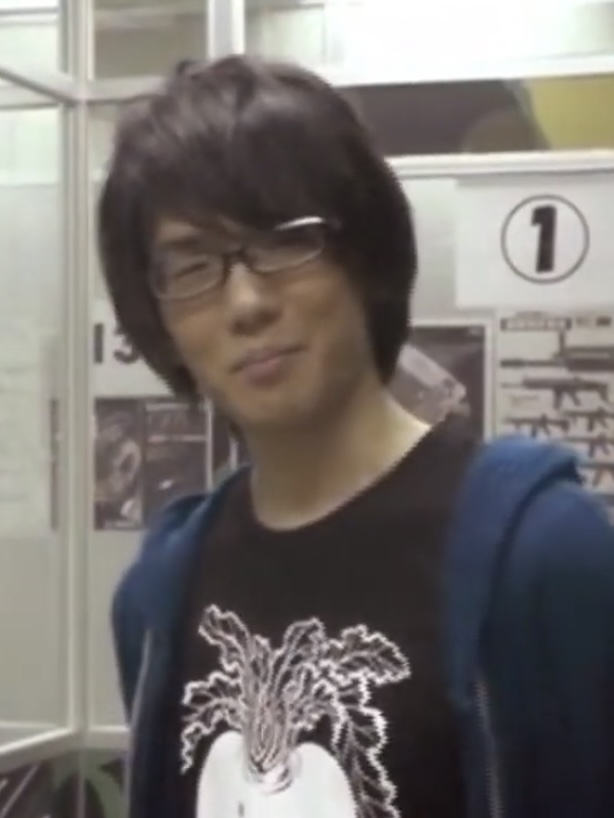
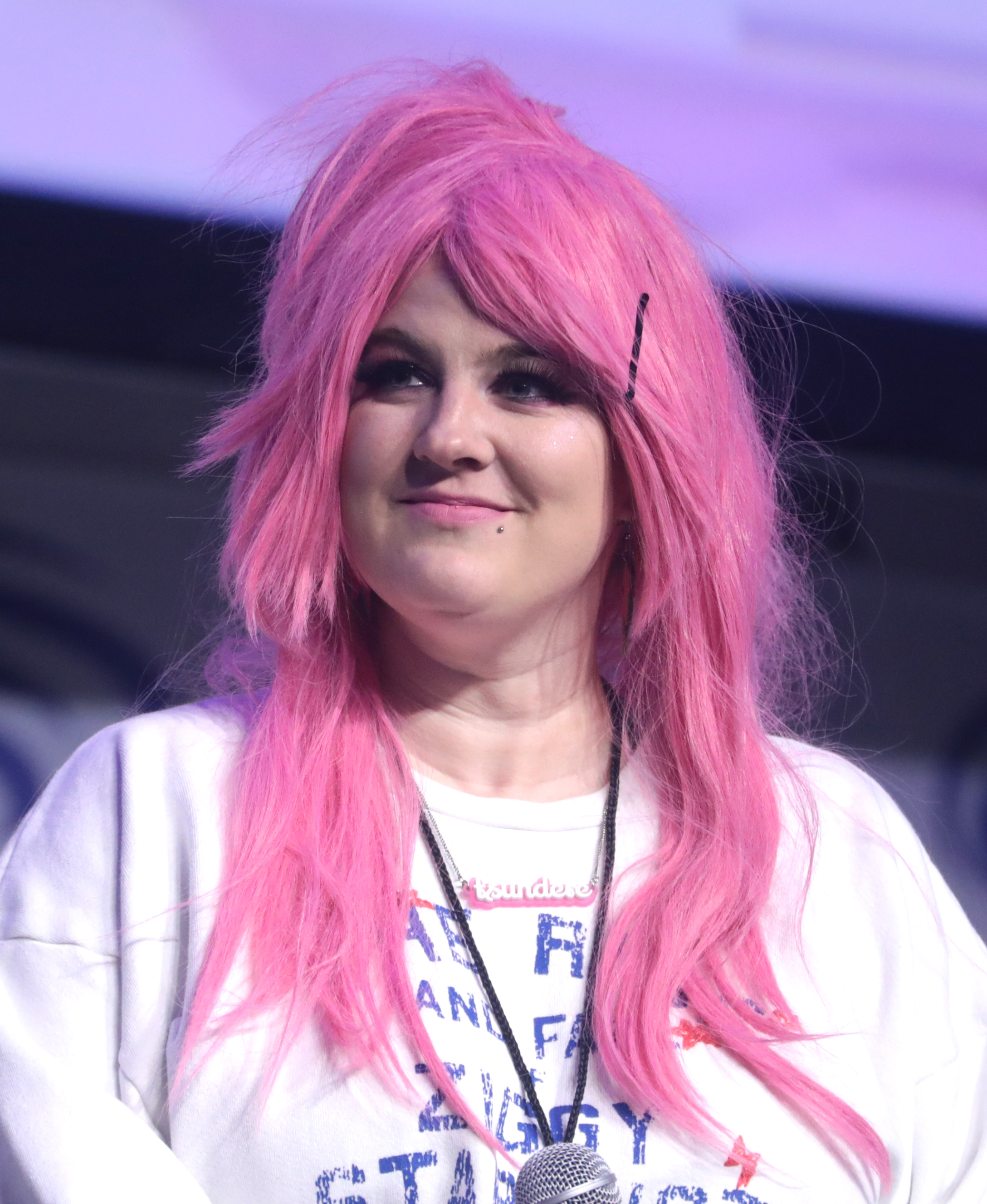
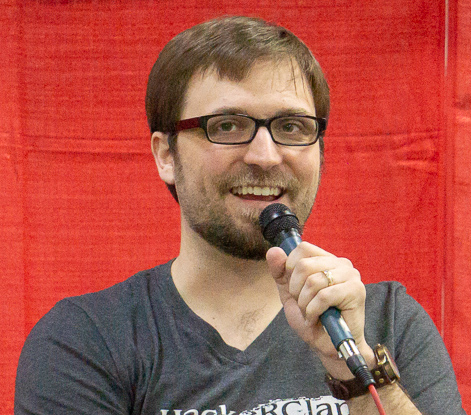
Japanese voice actors Yui Ishikawa (top left) and Natsuki Hanae (top right) reprised their roles of 2B and 9S, respectively along with their English counterparts, Kira Buckland (bottom left) and Kyle McCarley (bottom right).

Nier: Automata Ver1.1a is based on Nier Automata, a 2017 action role-playing game developed by PlatinumGames and published by Square Enix. A sequel to the 2010 video game Nier and forming part of the wider Drakengard series, the game was a critical and commercial success. Nier: Automata Ver1.1a is animated by A-1 Pictures. It is directed by Ryōji Masuyama, who handles series composition with original director Yoko Taro. Jun Nagai is character designer and animation director, and Hirofumi Sakagami is the art director. The episodes end with short puppet shows created by Moge.

The concept for an anime adaptation of Nier Automata was proposed by Aniplex in 2017 shortly after the game's release. Yoko was surprised as anime adaptations were often created as a game tie-in to increase sales. Hanae was present during an early discussion with Yoko and the game's producer Yosuke Saito, reacting with disbelief at the plan. When creating the characters, A-1 Pictures was given the CG character models by Square Enix, with the team then creating key frame animations for common expressions and sometimes simplifying the clothing's design and movement to make it manageable. The art design was more colorful, though they kept the established subdued palette. The Bunker scenes and opening animation, which appear to be to black and white, was difficult for the art team as they needed to find a close-enough shade to mimic a black-and-white effect. Commenting on the puppet design, Moge remembered creating the YoRHa puppets with patterns based on the designs on the full-sized characters.

Discussing the story, Yoko commented that simply replicating the game's story in anime form would be boring, so he proposed making several changes to the story to fit the new medium, something Masuyama and Aniplex initially resisted, prompting a prolonged debate between them. It was eventually agreed to balance sections faithful to the game with anime-original content. Masuyama and Yoko worked out the details, though Yoko tried to keep himself at a distance to give the anime team creative freedom. The scenario was worked on over a long period, with Saito commenting that the wishes of the game's production staff were incorporated into the reworked scenario. When planning the series, the first episode was written to mirror the game's opening tutorial section, with the second episode onwards deviating into its own version of events. The number of episodes was decided based on how many it would take to retell the game's story. When creating the storyboards, cutscenes from the game were reproduced very faithfully, then other new scenes added in while trying to regain the original atmosphere and creating a unified visual identity. Yoko commented that the anime's presentation allowed cinematic storytelling in a way the game could not accomplish. During the first season's episodes, flashbacks were included to events from both Nier and Drakengard. Yoko attributed their inclusion to the anime's staff, particularly Masuyama. Yoko also included elements related to A2's backstory that were not conveyed obviously in-game, hoping to deepen the viewers' connection with her.

Due to the format change, there were extended sequences away from the main characters, and the actors had to voice some scenes that were text-only in-game. Reprising her role of the protagonist, Yui Ishikawa mentioned that the story retained a depressive theme faithful to the original game. Her impression of 2B changed after five years of working in the title and she enjoyed her dynamic with Natsuki Hanae due to the bond they share. Hanae found the anime unique for displaying a different take on the characters' handling when compared to the original game. Atsumi Tanezaki was both excited and nervous to be joining the cast, enjoying performing Lily and finding the episode where her backstory was revealed a challenging section to perform. Yoko had a cameo role as two different Machine Lifeform characters.

=== Music ===
The music was handled by Monaca, a music production company who had worked with Yoko on multiple projects including Nier: Automata. Keiichi Okabe was a composer and arranger, and music producer. Keigo Hoashi and Kuniyuki Takahashi were co-composers and co-arrangers with Okabe. Shotaro Seo provided chorus work. Yukio Nagasaki acted as sound director. Upon being contacted, Okabe was told that he could use and arrange the game's original score, which comforted him as there were high expectations surrounding the anime. The original songs were generally quiet and without lyrics so as not to intrude upon the story, though original music was used when a scene was reproduced accurately.

The anime includes multiple opening and ending theme songs. The first cours' opening theme song is "Escalate" performed by Aimer. Aimer was inspired by the narrative's androids who act human-like to perform her song which also has the idea of tragedy. The first cours' ending theme song is "Antinomy" performed by Amazarashi. Amazarashi, who had worked with Yoko before on a promotional song for the game, wrote the song based around the game's narrative theme of uncovering truths that are the opposite of beliefs. Yoko directed a special music video, featuring a puppet show retelling the game's story using Machine Lifeforms. Yoko described the theme as fighting in a world without parents and finding hope even in repeated battles.

The second cours' opening theme song is "Black Box", written by Hiromu Akita of Amazarashi and performed by Lisa. Lisa, who was a fan of the game and had been excited for the series, described herself as "singing her heart out" to portray the song's emotions. Akita also commented that Lisa had portrayed the harsh world and struggles of 2B. The second cours' ending theme song is "Ai to Inori", written by Okabe with lyrics by Yoko and performed by virtual idol group Gems Company. Okabe wanted a theme that was different from previous theme songs in the anime, describing "Ai to Inori" as a theme which would immerse viewers in the world of Nier: Automata.

== Broadcast ==
The series was announced during the fifth anniversary livestream of Nier: Automata in February 2022. It began its broadcast on January during the late night time slot on Tokyo MX, Tochigi Television, Gunma Television, and BS11. An English-subtitled version was simulcast on Crunchyroll. The broadcast was twice delayed due to production issues caused resurgence in the COVID-19 pandemic. The first began with the third episode and lasted from January 28 to February 18. The second began following the eighth episode, and episodes 9–12 were broadcast back to back on July 23. After the broadcast of the final four episodes of the first cours, production on a second cours was announced to be green-lit. The second cours premiered on July 5, 2024. An English dubbed version by Aniplex of America and Bang Zoom! Studios began streaming through Crunchyroll on March 18. The game's English cast reprised their roles, with the only new cast member being Lily's English actor.

== Reception ==
Inverse praised the series premiere for being accessible for newcomers and faithful to the original game. Anime Feminist stated that while adapting the plot and themes from the original popular game was too difficult, the inclusion of Yoko Taro as a writer seems to make the overall premise positive. The Escapist found the first episode original for constantly switching between the leads' perspectives rather than relying primarily on 2B alone in order to provide a more unique approach to the story and enjoyed Yoko's inclusion in the anime. Collider praised how the second season handled A2's character, claiming her portrayal is superior to the original media.
