= Voice of Cards: The Isle Dragon Roars =

- Developer: Alim
- Publisher: Square Enix
- Directors: Maasa Mimura; Yoko Taro
- Artist: Kimihiko Fujisaka
- Writer: Yuuki Matsuo
- Composers: Oliver Good; Shotaro Seo; Keiichi Okabe
- Series: Voice of Cards
- Platforms: Nintendo Switch; PlayStation 4; Windows; Android; iOS
- Release: PlayStation 4, Nintendo Switch, Windows; October 28, 2021; Android, iOS; March 23, 2023
- Genre: Role-playing
- Modes: Single-player, multiplayer

Voice of Cards: The Isle Dragon Roars (Note: Japanese: Voice of Cards: ドラゴンの島, Hepburn: Boisu ofu Kādo: Doragon no Shima) is a 2021 role-playing video game developed by Alim and published by Square Enix for PlayStation 4, Nintendo Switch and Windows. It was released for Android and iOS in 2023. Using the aesthetic of a tabletop role-playing game, the player controls a party of adventurers in the wake of a legendary dragon's reappearance. Gameplay involves travelling between towns, completing story quests and fighting in turn-based battles.

The game staff included several veterans of the Drakengard series and its spin-off Nier, including creative director Yoko Taro, executive producer Yosuke Saito, composer Keiichi Okabe, and artist Kimihiko Fujisaka. The game was initially pitched by Yoko as a social mobile game, but Saito insisted on it being developed as a small-scale console title. The game met with positive reviews from journalists, with praise focusing on its presentation and narrative. Two follow-up titles released the following year; Voice of Cards: The Forsaken Maiden and Voice of Cards: The Beasts of Burden.

== Gameplay ==
A battle in Voice of Cards: The Isle Dragon Roars; battles and other in-game elements are presented in the style of a tabletop role-playing game.

Voice of Cards: The Isle Dragon Roars is a role-playing video game which presents its world, characters and battles in the style of a tabletop role-playing game; everything is represented using cards, with the player navigating environments as a game piece. The player explores the game's setting of the Island of Bliss, with areas blocked off until certain story events are completed. The environments are split between towns, the overworld, and dungeons.

During navigation, the player uncovers the map through flipping adjacent cards, sometimes triggering random events and finding treasure chests, with some encounters requiring a die roll to determine the outcome. The player's piece can move one card at a time, or jump to revealed cards. Completing certain quests for characters earns the player a Mysterious Card, which plays into the ending of the story. In towns, players can engage in a card-based minigame, with the aim being to match card types and scores while working with or around random card effects, with the winner having the highest score. The card minigame supports four-person local multiplayer.

Battles play out through both scripted and random encounters with a party of four controlled by the player; protagonists Barren and Laty, and two other characters dictated by the storyline. During combat, the player can perform standard attacks, use items, and perform skills using gems generated once per turn and added to a pool. During some battles, happenstance cards are triggered, granting an effect to both the player and the enemy party. Damage from attacks is calculated using the attack and defense values on each card, while each character can only have one positive and one negative status effect at a time. Upon winning, the party is awarded with gold and experience points, with leveling up raising a character's health and attributes.

== Synopsis ==
On the Isle of Bliss, a Dragon said to bring catastrophe in its wake arrives. Queen Nilla sends adventurer bands to slay the Dragon and the monsters that emerged in its wake. Adventurer Ash and his monster partner Mar takes on the job for coin, being joined by the witch Melanie as she also seeks the Dragon. They often cross paths and are impeded by Wynifred and Sherwyn of the Ivory Order, a group who control a panacea called Dragontears. During their travels, Ash's party grows with more members, and he runs across other villages with conflicts related to the main quest including a village which uses sentient monsters as a food source, and discover that the Dragon is being aided by a man called Vince, later revealed to be Melanie's brother.

Reaching the village nearest the Dragon's lair, it is revealed to be a testing ground for Dragontear treatments. Ash belonged to that village, with Mar having been his sister; an experiment on their family following an escape attempt killed their parents, transformed Mar into a monster, and caused Ash to suffer traumatic amnesia. Dragontears is further revealed to be the literal tears of the Dragon extracted through torture by the Ivory Order, its current rampage being collateral damage after being freed by Vince; it now seeks to die before the Ivory Order recapture it. Vince is killed defending the Dragon before it can explain its motives, then Sherwyn arrives and kills the Dragon; his family was a victim of Dragontear experiments, and he joined the Ivory Order to get revenge. The group pursue him, as he intends to destroy the last vials of Dragontear which can cure Mar of her condition.

The group, aided by Wynifred, fight Sherwyn, who transforms into a dragon-like Monster after drinking the last vial of Dragontear, with the fight leaving only one drop of Dragontear for use. To weaken Sherwyn's dragon form, Melanie is forced to use forbidden magic which transforms her into a monster. Ash must choose between curing Mar or Melanie, or resurrecting the Dragon; all three endings end with the Isle of Bliss falling into civil war following the revelation surrounding Dragontear. If ten Mysterious Cards are collected, Ash successfully wishes for the Dragontear drop to do all three actions. In this ending, the Dragon agrees to continue providing the medicine in exchange for a life in peace, Nilla disbands the Ivory Order and puts controls on experimentation with Dragontear, Wynifred founds a new group to help the people, and Ash continues his adventuring life with Mar and Melanie.

== Development ==
Voice of Cards was developed by Alim, a company who had previously worked mobile projects, including Final Fantasy Brave Exvius with publisher Square Enix. Multiple staff members from the Drakengard series and its spin-off Nier were involved in production. These included creative director Yoko Taro, executive producer Yosuke Saito, artist Kimihiko Fujisaka, and music director Keiichi Okabe of Monaca. Alim's Maasa Mimura acted as the game's director. The scenario was written by Yuuki Matsuo, a lead writer on Nier Reincarnation. The project was proposed by Yoko and Fujisaka, with Yoko originally pitching it as a mobile social game. Saito instead insisted that the project be a small-scale console title, as he felt Yoko would be overworked due to his existing commitment to managing several mobile games including Nier Reincarnation. According to Saito, production took place during and between Nier Reincarnation and the remastered version of Nier: Replicant, taking much longer than was initially planned. Production was also challenging for Alim as it was the company's first console project, and being developed for three platforms at once. When Yoko gave the game pitch to Alim, he described it as a normal RPG design with analogue expression through cards. He wanted to emulate the feeling of being an "otaku gamemaster". While using a tabletop aesthetic, it was designed as a standard RPG. Mimura paid attention to the analogue expression of the world design and gameplay.

A focus for Alim was creating expressive actions for the cards, through Yoko later asked for some of the in-battle card effects to be removed as he felt them unnecessary. Fujisaka's early illustrations were strongly inspired by medieval Europe, but he disliked these early drafts and after the setting was created, he adjusted the art to its final design. He also gave them an "inorganic" aesthetic to match with his earlier work with Yoko. Matsuo wrote the scenario based on Fujisaka's illustrations, aiming to create a story to match the artwork's beauty. Yoko was not directly involved in writing the scenario, instead contributing rewrites and expansions to Matsuo's work. Describing his wishes for the scenario, Yoko wanted to create a story as close as possible to the traditional storylines of games like Dragon Quest, attributing its twists to being a "twisted" character himself. The inclusion of two dragons was attributed by Yoko to Matsuo. Matsuo remembered getting into trouble during production as work on the scenario fell behind schedule. The use of a single voice actor was meant to emulate a gamemaster telling the story. Yoko also said that the game's limited budget played a part in the decision. The gamemaster was voiced by Todd Haberkorn in English and Hiroki Yasumoto in Japanese.

=== Music ===
The music was composed primarily by Oliver Good, with additional work by Shotaro Seo and Okabe. The soundtrack formed part of a push by Okabe to distance his company Monaca from himself, allowing other composers to find prominence. The music was written with an "Irish atmosphere". Okabe described Good as creating a consistent and delicate sound, while Seo contributed to vocal tracks as male chorus as he had done with Nier: Automata. Seo's style of "catchy" tunes was brought in to balance with Good's melodic Celtic sound. To create an analogue atmosphere, the music was recorded using live instruments. Around ten music tracks were created in total, not counting variations used in-game.

The female vocals for the main theme "Pursuing the Dragon" were provided by Yukino Orita, and the track "Twin Recollections" was performed by Saki Nakae, while the violin was performed by Mitsuri Shimada, and Good performed the guitar parts for his own and Seo's work. Additional vocals were provided by Seo. Due to the COVID-19 pandemic, Good had to work from his home in England much of the time, though as he lived next to a forest area, he was able to use his environment to inspire his work. Good's favorite track was the field theme "The Adventures of the Self-proclaimed Hero", which was performed correctly on the first attempt. Seo's favorite track was the battle theme "Pulsing Power", which he described as a fantastical take on Good's Celtic elements. Okabe's cited favorite was "Twin Recollections", which he cited as closest in style to his work on Yoko's other projects and evoking the vocal style of Irish singer Enya. The track titles were created by Yoko and the scenario team.

== Release ==
Due to its unconventional design, Square Enix's marketing had trouble working out how to promote it. Voice of Cards was officially announced on 9 September 2021. Yoko later clarified that it was not part of his Drakengard series despite the shared staff, nor was it a social game. Its release date of October 28 on Microsoft Windows, Nintendo Switch and PlayStation 4 was announced on September 23. A demo was released alongside the announcement, following the Ivory Order's search for a royal treasure. The game also included paid DLC items themed after the setting and characters of Nier. A digital soundtrack album was released on November 12. It was ported to Android and iOS on March 23, 2023.

== Reception ==
Reception

Aggregate scores
Aggregator	Score
Metacritic	NS: 76/100; PC: 68/100; PS4: 75/100
OpenCritic	56% recommend

Review scores
Publication	Score
Destructoid	7.5/10
GameSpot	8/10
Hardcore Gamer	3.5/5
Jeuxvideo.com	14/20
Nintendo Life	8/10
Nintendo World Report	7.5/10
PC Gamer (US)	55/100
Push Square	7/10
RPGamer	3/5
RPGFan	75/100

Voice of Cards: The Isle Dragon Roars received "generally favorable" reviews for most platforms according to review aggregator Metacritic; the Windows version received "mixed or average" reviews. Fellow review aggregator OpenCritic assessed that the game received fair approval, being recommended by 56% of critics.

Destructoid praised the visual style, calling it "a unique look... bolstered further by the excellent character art". PC Gamer disliked the way the visual style was used, feeling it became repetitive later in the game, "But the wow wears off. There's little variety or poetry in these building blocks, just acres of repeated grass and mountains, as sparse and basic as the 8-bit tilesets of a NES Dragon Quest". While feeling mixed about the combat, Nintendo Life enjoyed the narrative, especially the narrator, writing, "every line of dialogue has a smooth and relaxing cadence that really sells the idea that you’re sitting by firelight at a table with a guy who loves telling stories".

Nintendo World Report wrote that the game could have used more challenge or a higher difficulty, with the reviewer saying, "I avoided about half of random battles and only faced a bit of difficulty in the game's final dungeon". GameSpot felt the story was purposeful, writing, "Every story thread feels like it's there for a reason, with anything dark or unusual serving the story rather than being there to merely shock you". Rock Paper Shotgun disliked how long animations and random battles affected the pacing, "If the endless grey and brown tiles of its dungeons weren't tiring enough, the combination of its repetitive battles, the slow slide of its card animations and the one too many seconds it takes to jab over to the run menu meant I was yearning for a fast forward button in the style of Bravely Default II before I'd even hit the halfway mark".

== Sequels ==
Saito planned Voice of Cards to be a series of games, later clarified as a trilogy. Development on a follow-up beginning after the release of The Isle Dragon Roars; most of the staff returned including Yoko, Matsuo, Fujisaka, Mimura and the Monaca composers. Titled Voice of Cards: The Forsaken Maiden, the game released worldwide on February 17, 2022 for PS4, Switch and Windows. A second follow-up titled Voice of Cards: The Beasts of Burden was released in September 2022. A bundle of all three games was released alongside the mobile ports.
