= Nier: Orchestra Concert 12024 – The end of data =

2024–2025 Concert tour for Nier video game series

NieR:Orchestra Concert 12024 [ the end of data ]
- International tour by Square Enix
- Promotional poster featuring 9S and 2B
- Conductor: Arnie Roth and Eric Roth
- Composers: Keiichi Okabe
- Location: Asia; Europe; North America
- Start date: January 27, 2024
- End date: January 11, 2025
- No. of shows: 19
- Guests: Kira Buckland as 2B, Kyle McCarley as 9S (pre-recorded)
- Supporting acts: J'Nique Nicole, Emi Evans
- Producers: Yosuke Saito and Yoko Taro
- Attendance: 55,000
- Website: https://www.nierconcert.com/

NieR:Orchestra Concert re:12024 [ the end of data ]
- Tour by Square Enix
- Conductor: Eric Roth
- Location: Japan
- Venue: Grand Cube Osaka and Tokyo International Forum (Hall A)
- Start date: 25 July 2025
- End date: 3 August 2025
- No. of shows: 4
- Guests: Yui Ishikawa as 2B, Natsuki Hanae as 9S (pre-recorded)

Nier: Orchestra Concert 12024 – The end of data (Note: Stylized as NieR:Orchestra Concert 12024 [ the end of data ]) was an international live concert tour by AWR Music Productions and Square Enix. The concerts consisted of music from the video games Nier, (Note: Stylized as NieR) Nier: Automata, (Note: Stylized as NieR:Automata) and the anime Nier: Automata Ver1.1a. (Note: Stylized as NieR:Automata Ver1.1a) The show premiered on January 27, 2024, in Los Angeles and ran through January 2025, visiting cities including Chicago, Berlin, Barcelona, Paris, Bangkok, and Orlando.

In 2025, Square Enix announced Nier: Orchestra Concert re:12024 – The end of data, (Note: Stylized as NieR: Orchestra Concert re:12024 [ the end of data ]) a Japan‑only version timed to coincide with the 15th anniversary of Nier. This edition features pre‑recorded narrative readings from the Japanese voice actors for 2B and 9S, Yui Ishikawa and Natsuki Hanae, in a tailored experience for the Japanese audience.

== Background and production ==
Nier: Orchestra Concert 12024 – The end of data was conceived as a multimedia celebration of the Nier series, produced jointly by Square Enix and AWR Music Productions. Announced in July 2023, the tour was designed as an immersive live orchestral experience featuring music from the Nier series. It also expanded upon the lore of Nier: Automata, introducing a new, canonical epilogue for one of the game's endings. The concert was described as a "visual novel style story being told through [...] text [overlaid] over visuals".

The concert tour featured performances from English singer and voice actress Emi Evans, as well as Tokyo-based American singer-songwriter J'Nique Nicole. Additionally, Nier director Yoko Taro and composer Keiichi Okabe created exclusive video material to accompany the music. Yoko Taro and Keiichi Okabe also often made guest appearances, with Yoko Taro wearing his trademark "Emil" mask and being “guided on and off stage” by handlers due to limited visibility. Both Arnie Roth and Eric Roth served as the music directors and chief arrangers for the tour. They have previously collaborated with Square Enix and AWR on live concerts for Final Fantasy VII and Final Fantasy XIV—namely the Distant Worlds tours. Furthermore, the concerts featured pre-recorded readings from Kira Buckland and Kyle McCarley, the English voice actors for 2B and 9S.

The international tour spanned 15 cities across North America, Europe, and Asia from January 2024 through January 2025, drawing approximately 55,000 attendees to 19 performances.

Following the success of the world tour, and to celebrate the 15th anniversary of the original Nier game, Square Enix announced a Japan-exclusive leg of the concert with four dates in both Tokyo and Osaka. Like the world tour, Nier: Orchestra Concert re:12024 – The end of data is conducted by Eric Roth and features performances from the Osaka Symphony Orchestra and the Kanagawa Philharmonic Orchestra. Re:12024 is a near-identical version of 12024, re-imagined for Japanese audiences. It adds additional readings from Yui Ishikawa and Natsuki Hanae, the voice actors for 2B and 9S, the main player characters of Nier: Automata.

== Set list ==
The set list consists of 21 songs from Nier Replicant and Nier: Automata.

Set list in Los Angeles on January 27, 2024

First Half

1. "Crumbling Lies"
2. "City in Ruins"
3. "Snow in Summer"
4. "Song of the Ancients"
5. "Amusement Park"
6. "Gods Bound by No Rules"
7. "Deep Crimson Foe"
8. "Shadow Lord"

Second Half

1. "Copied City"
2. "Emil"
3. "A Beautiful Song"
4. "Fleeting Words"
5. "The Sound of the End"
6. "Forest Kingdom"
7. "Possessed by Disease"
8. "Dark Colosseus"
9. "Bipolar Nightmare"
10. "Mourning"
11. "Ashes of Dreams"
12. "Weight of the World"

Encore

1. "Kainé"

== Tour dates ==
List of concerts, showing date, city, country and venue
Date	City	Country	Venue
Leg 1 – NieR:Orchestra Concert 12024 [ the end of data ]
January 27, 2024	Los Angeles	United States	Peacock Theatre
January 31, 2024	Dallas	United States	Texas Trust CU Theatre
February 3, 2024	Chicago	United States	Rosemont Theatre
February 7, 2024	Vancouver	Canada	The Orpheum
February 10, 2024	Berlin	Germany	Tempodrom
February 11, 2024	Berlin	Germany	Tempodrom
February 14, 2024	London	United Kingdom	Royal Festival Hall
February 17, 2024	Barcelona	Spain	Auditori Fòrum
February 22, 2024	Paris	France	Palais des Congrès
February 23, 2024	Paris	France	Palais des Congrès
March 16, 2024	Bangkok	Thailand	Prince Mahidol Hall
March 17, 2024	Bangkok	Thailand	Prince Mahidol Hall
March 29, 2024	Atlanta	United States	Fox Theatre
March 30, 2024	Orlando	United States	Dr. Phillips Center
June 1, 2024	Taipei	Taiwan	Taipei Music Center
October 25, 2024	Boston	United States	Boch Center
October 26, 2024	Washington, D.C.	United States	DAR Constitution Hall
October 27, 2024	Washington, D.C.	United States	DAR Constitution Hall
January 11, 2025	Seoul	South Korea	Kyung Hee University – Grand Peace Palace
Leg 2 – NieR:Orchestra Concert re:12024 [ the end of data ]
July 25, 2025	Osaka	Japan	Osaka International Convention Center
July 26, 2025	Osaka	Japan	Osaka International Convention Center
August 2, 2025	Tokyo	Japan	Tokyo International Forum Hall A
August 3, 2025	Tokyo	Japan	Tokyo International Forum Hall A
Leg 3 – NieR:Orchestra Concert re:12024 [ the end of data ]
January 11, 2026	New York	United States	Stern Auditorium / Perelman Stage at Carnegie Hall

== Reception ==
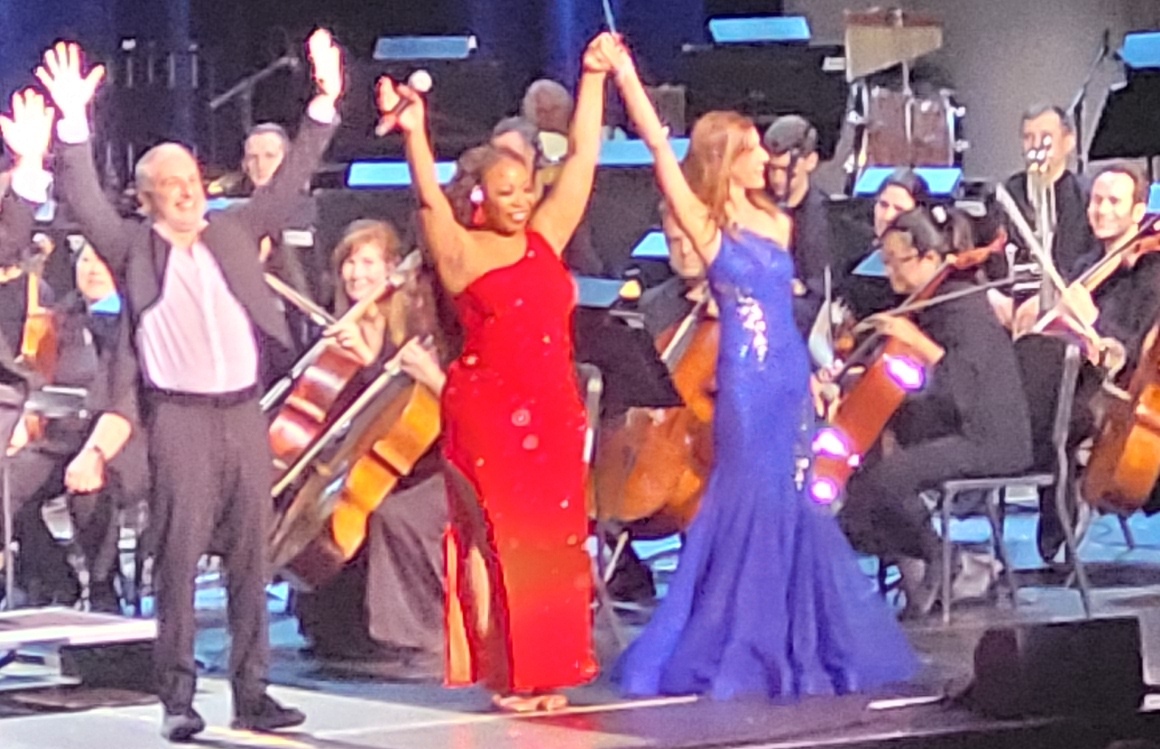
Left to right: Eric Roth, J'nique Nicole, Emi Evans at Constitution Hall in Washington, DC.

Nier: Orchestra Concert 12024 – The end of data received widespread acclaim from both fans and press, who praised it for its musical execution, emotional resonance, and integration of narrative storytelling. Quentin H. of Operation Rainfall awarded the tour a perfect score, commending both its musical performance and its effective recital and progression of the Nier games' narrative. Boss Rush Network's Michaela El-Ters gave the concert a five out of five score, stating that the game soundtracks were "made for live performances". James Galizio of RPG Site called 12024 "more than just a traditional concert" and applauded the choir, orchestra, and solo-vocalists Emi Evans and J'nique Nicole. Tim Reichert of Forschungsgemeinschaft VideospielMusikWissenschaft noted the authenticity of the performers and praised the way the dynamic music from the games was handled, highlighting how the orchestral arrangements effectively transitioned from minimalist to intense to reflect in-game states like combat or exploration.

== See also ==
- Holocene calendar – like the 2018 concert Nier:Orchestra Concert 12018, the naming for the Nier: Orchestra Concert 12024 – The end of data tour follows the Holocene calendar
- Music of Nier
- Yoko Taro
