= Music of Nier =

Music of the video game series Nier

Nier is an action role-playing video game developed by Cavia and published by Square Enix in 2010. The music of Nier was composed by Keiichi Okabe with members of his studio, Monaca, Kakeru Ishihama and Keigo Hoashi, and Takafumi Nishimura of Cavia. The soundtrack has inspired the release of four official albums by Square Enix—an official soundtrack album and three albums of arrangements—along with two mini-albums included as pre-order bonuses for the Japanese versions of the game and two licensed EPs of jazz arrangements.

The original soundtrack was highly praised; reviewers noted it as one of the best video game soundtracks of the year, praising the originality of the compositions and the beauty of Emi Evans' vocal work. The first arranged album, while also warmly received, was perceived by critics to be weaker than the original and not long enough to stand up to the expectations created by the success of the original. The first three albums sold well enough to be recorded on the Japanese Oricon music charts, reaching number 24 for the original soundtrack, 59 for the first arranged album, and position number 77 for the second.

The soundtrack for Nier's sequel, Nier: Automata, was released worldwide on March 29, 2017. Returning collaborators include Keiichi Okabe and the Monaca team on composing duties and Emi Evans on vocals, along with several other singers and lyricists. Nier: Automata Original Soundtrack was highly reviewed by critics, and the album peaked at number 2 on the Oricon charts. A third game in the series, Nier Reincarnation, was available as a live service mobile game between 2021 and 2024. The music was primarily handled by Okabe, and was not released as an album.

== Development ==
=== Nier ===
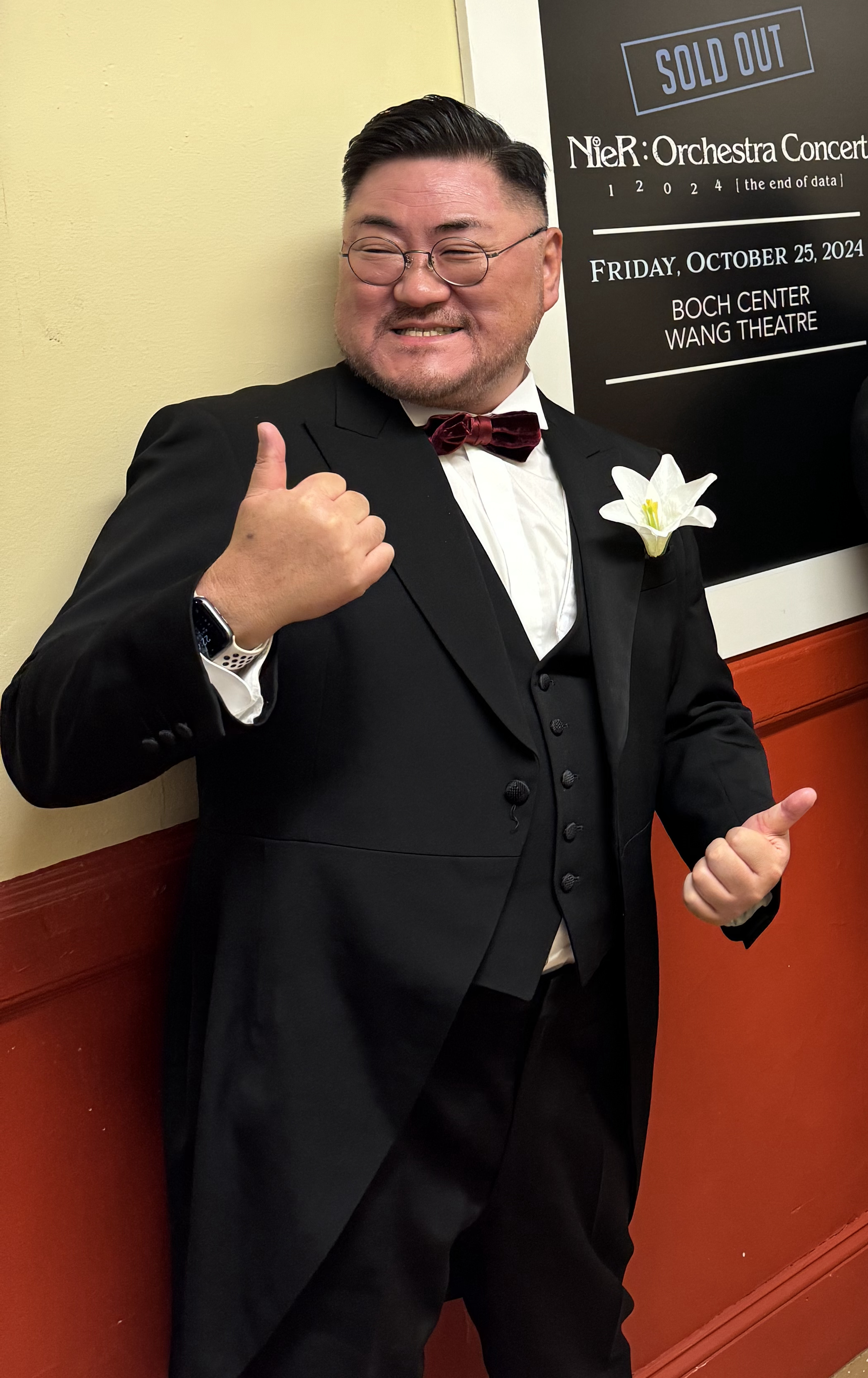
Okabe in October 2024

The soundtrack to Nier was composed by a collaboration of the studio Monaca, consisting of Keiichi Okabe, Kakeru Ishihama, and Keigo Hoashi, along with Takafumi Nishimura from Cavia, the game's developer. Okabe served as the lead composer and as the director for the project as a whole. Okabe was brought onto the project when the concept for the game was first being devised, and worked intermittently on the soundtrack for the next three years until its release. The music for the game was generally composed legal entirely separate from the development of the game. Often, elements of the game were modified to match the music, rather than the other way around. Some tracks were used in ways that the composers did not envision, such as "Grandma", which was expected to be used in the prologue of the game but was instead chosen as a boss battle theme. The music was designed for different motifs to appear in various arrangements throughout the soundtrack, and also to convey a sense of sadness even during the "thrilling" tracks. Okabe was allowed a great deal of freedom regarding what the music was to sound like; game director Taro Yoko's main request was that he use a lot of vocal works.

The vocals and lyrics were provided by vocalist Emi Evans (Emiko Rebecca Evans), a singer from England living in Tokyo. She is the singer for the band freesscape, and had previously worked on video game projects such as the Etrian Odyssey arrange albums. The Monaca team had met her when considering her for a prior project, and Okabe wanted to work with her on Nier. She was approached a few months after the initial meeting in Autumn 2008 to be the vocalist for the soundtrack. In addition to singing, Evans was asked to write her own lyrics in futuristic languages. The composers gave her preliminary version of songs and the style they wished the language to be in, such as Scottish Gaelic or French, and she invented the words. Evans wrote songs in versions of Scottish Gaelic, Portuguese, Spanish, Italian, French, English and Japanese, and wrote "Song of the Ancients" in an entirely fictional language. She wrote that song by listening to songs in as many languages as possible and jumbling them up together. For the other languages, she tried to imagine what they would sound like after 1000 years of drifting.

Okabe did not want to use traditional lyrics, as he felt they would clash with the design of the world in the game, and wanted to use a variety of languages to represent the open nature of the game's world. He also did not want easily recognizable lyrics to be sung in the background while the characters were speaking, and for any noticeable words to instead evoke emotions in the player. Evans only knew English, Japanese, and French when she began the project; she listened to the other languages on YouTube to learn the rhythms and sounds of the languages and then mixed and changed them. Okabe largely allowed Evans to decide how to integrate the lyrics with the early forms of the songs, and as he usually did not know where the songs would be used in the game gave her only light direction as to the emotional tone for the songs. The composers often would modify the songs in later revisions to follow how Evans had sung for that song.

=== Nier: Automata ===
Composer Keiichi Okabe returned as lead composer with his studio band Monaca, alongside fellow members Keigo Hoashi, Kuniyuki Takahashi, and Kakeru Ishihama. The score was influenced by classical music, while recalling elements used for Nier such as the overall sense of melancholy. A change from the previous score was a shift to portraying a more mechanical and brutal theme and environment than Nier, which had focused on grasslands and villages. Another factor was the open world environment: rather than a single looping track, Okabe created multiple hard and soft tracks that transitioned into each other depending on situation and environment. Balancing of the music was carried out using the digital audio workstation (DAW) Pro Tools. Another prominent return was Emi Evans, who provided vocals for the first game's soundtrack. Additional male vocals were provided by Shotaro Seo. In addition, a theme song was created for the game, with versions sung by both Evans and new singer J'Nique Nicole. Nicole and Nami Nakagawa joined with Evans to form a three-part chorus for some of the musical work, including a boss theme featured in the game. Several songs from the Nier soundtrack were arranged for Nier: Automata.

The general sound design was handled by Masato Shindo, who was faced with a challenge new to the PlatinumGames staff: in their previous projects sound echoes had been handled by individual settings created by the team, but that would not work properly in an open world setting due to its scale. Instead, Shindo designed a realistic soundscape using a system to manage echoes in real time, determining how much reverberation to generate based on current surroundings. Sound implementation was handled by Masami Ueda, and it was a greater amount of work than he had experienced on any previous project. One of the factors that helped with the smooth implementation was Ueda's previous encounters and good working relationship with Okabe.

=== Nier Reincarnation ===
A third game in the series, Nier Reincarnation, was available as a live service mobile game between 2021 and 2024. The music was again primarily handled by Okabe. His contribution was around twenty songs, all original and not incorporating music from earlier Nier titles. Shotaro Seo also acted as composer, and co-arranger with Okabe. Due to being created for a mobile game, the music was made less dramatic than earlier home console entries, with a minimalist ambient style compared by Okabe to "diving into a spiritual world". On Yoko's request, each song covered a variety of styles while maintaining the established atmosphere of the Nier universe. The musical style was influenced by the game's "nostalgic" atmosphere, which was compared to a fairy tale atmosphere. Rather than having strong melodies, the music was designed to be "smooth". Vocals and chorus were handled by Kocho, Yukino Orita, Saki Ishii, and Seo. Vocals were restricted to Weapon Story and battle tracks.

For the second story arc, Okabe and Seo returned as composers and arrangers. The new music focused on strings and woodwinds to match the change to the story's atmosphere. Yoko requested a broader musical style for the second arc's score, with the instrumentation becoming less ambient and the battle theme incorporating electronica. For one story, they also created a new version of "Normandy", a theme created for a stage play related to Nier: Automata. Vocals were provided by Kocho, Seo, Orita, and Saki Nakae. The main theme, representing the two siblings, had a complex interplay of vocal parts between Orita and Seo. For the third arc, Seo co-composed with Kuniyuki Takahashi. Kocho, Orita and Nakae returned to provide vocals and chorus.

== Releases ==
=== Nier ===
==== NieR Gestalt & Replicant Original Soundtrack ====
NieR Gestalt & Replicant Original Soundtrack

Soundtrack album by Keiichi Okabe
- Released: April 21, 2010
- Genres: New age, classical, orchestra
- Length: 2:30:09
- Label: Square Enix

The soundtrack to Nier is largely composed of melancholy acoustic pieces which heavily feature vocals by Emi Evans. Of the 43 tracks included in the released soundtrack album, only 9 do not have any vocal component to them; these are the four versions each of "Dispossession" and "Yonah", as well as "Dance of the Evanescent". With the exception of "Ashes of Dreams", the lyrics are not intended to mean anything.

For "Ashes of Dreams", Evans convinced the composers that one song in the soundtrack should have recognizable lyrics rather than futuristic English as they originally planned. Evans was given a list of Japanese words to use, which she then translated for the English, French, and Scottish Gaelic versions of the song. The song and its variants were the last to be recorded. Evans found "Ashes of Dreams" to be the most difficult song to write on the soundtrack, as she had difficulty writing lyrics that met the composers' criteria of despair and lack of hope.

"Hills of Radiant Wind" is one of the few upbeat songs on the largely dark soundtrack; for that piece Evans sang in a version of Portuguese in a style meant to sound like a spirit floating on the wind. For "Grandma", she sang in a French style, trying to "put in as much anguish and melancholy" as possible; she created the song in a single recording, and it is "one of the most memorable songs" that she has sung. "The Wretched Automatons" is sung in a variant of English and was recorded prior to the addition of the mechanical sounds that run throughout the track, while "Kainé" is in a version of Gaelic.

Square Enix released a soundtrack album of music from the game, titled NieR Gestalt & Replicant Original Soundtrack, on April 21, 2010. The two-disc, 2:30:09-long album has the catalog numbers of SQEX-10189/90. As preorder bonuses for Nier Gestalt and Nier Replicant, the two versions of the game released in Japan, two mini-albums, Nier Gestalt Mini Album and Nier Replicant Mini Album, were included. Each one contains five tracks from the full soundtrack album; Gestalt corresponds with tracks 1 and 4 from disc 1, 8 and 13 from disc 2, and an electronic version of "Kainé" titled "Kainé / Rain of Light", while Replicant encompasses track 3 from disc 2, tracks 2 and 7 from disc 1, track 1 from disc 2, and a medley of several tracks. Gestalt is 18:11 long, and Replicant 17:11. A book of sheet music of piano arrangements of tracks from the game by Okabe was published by KMP on April 22, 2011. The book, NieR Gestalt & Replicant Official Score Book, contains 25 arrangements in 112 pages. Guitar arrangements of "Song of the Ancients / Devola" and "Yonah / Strings Ver." by Yuji Sekiguchi were included in the Square Enix Official Best Collection guitar solo sheet music book, published by KMP in May 2011.

The soundtrack album reached number 24 on the Japanese Oricon music charts, and remained on the charts for 11 weeks. It was well received by critics; Patrick Gann of RPGFan called the album "an insanely good soundtrack" and noted it as his candidate for video game soundtrack of the year, as well as "one of the best game soundtracks ever". He applauded that the music was both "meticulously-crafted" and "accessible to the untrained ear". Don Kotowski of Square Enix Music Online praised the "captivating vocal work" and "exquisite" composition. He also noted that each track retained a sense of individuality even when it reused themes from other tracks. He was less complimentary towards the mini albums, which he regarded as good introductions to the soundtrack as a whole but not worth purchasing on their own. Jayson Napolitano of Original Sound Version also praised the album, saying that it was "hands down one of the best soundtracks Square Enix has published over the years". Calling it "captivating" and "otherworldly", he applauded the album's originality and Evans' vocals. Original Sound Version later named the soundtrack as the best video game soundtrack of 2010, and Square Enix Music Online awarded it the best Japanese video game soundtrack of the year.

Track list

Disc 1
No.	Title	Japanese title	Length
1.	"Snow in Summer"	夏ノ雪	4:59
2.	"Hills of Radiant Wind"	光ノ風吹ク丘	2:53
3.	"The Incomplete Stone"	不完全ナ石	4:42
4.	"Blu-bird"	青イ鳥	2:40
5.	"Cold Steel Coffin"	心閉ザセシ鉄棺	3:26
6.	"Grandma"	オバアチャン	3:40
7.	"Song of the Ancients / Devola"	イニシエノウタ／デボル	3:05
8.	"The Wretched Automatons"	愚カシイ機械	4:48
9.	"City of Commerce"	売買ノ街	2:18
10.	"Song of the Ancients / Popola"	イニシエノウタ／ポポル	3:04
11.	"The Prestigious Mask"	仮面ノ誉	2:26
12.	"Temple of Drifting Sands"	流砂ノ神殿	4:03
13.	"Gods Bound by Rules"	掟ニ囚ワレシ神	4:38
14.	"The Ultimate Weapon"	最終兵器	4:55
15.	"Deep Crimson Foe"	深紅ノ敵	2:21
16.	"Dispossession / Piano Ver."	喪失／Ver.ピアノ	2:40
17.	"Dispossession / Strings Ver."	喪失／Ver.重奏	2:14
18.	"Dispossession / Pluck Ver."	喪失／Ver.弦	2:57
19.	"Dispossession / Music Box Ver."	喪失／Ver.オルゴール	1:34
20.	"Yonah / Piano Ver."	ヨナ／Ver.ピアノ	2:53
21.	"Yonah / Strings Ver."	ヨナ／Ver.重奏	3:06
22.	"Yonah / Pluck Ver. 1"	ヨナ／Ver.弦その1	2:39
23.	"Yonah / Pluck Ver. 2"	ヨナ／Ver.弦その2	1:57

Disc 2
No.	Title	Japanese title	Length
1.	"The Dark Colossus Destroys All"	全テヲ破壊スル黒キ巨人	3:03
2.	"Song of the Ancients / Hollow Dreams"	イニシエノウタ／虚ロナ夢	2:41
3.	"Kainé / Salvation"	カイネ／救済	3:03
4.	"Kainé / Escape"	カイネ／逃避	3:07
5.	"His Dream"	彼ノ夢	1:57
6.	"This Dream"	此ノ夢	1:56
7.	"Repose"	休息	2:40
8.	"The Lost Forest"	失ワレタ森	2:58
9.	"Song of the Ancients / Fate"	イニシエノウタ／運命	5:17
10.	"Shadowlord's Castle / Memory"	魔王ノ城／記憶	2:50
11.	"Dance of the Evanescent"	儚キ者達ノ舞踏	0:54
12.	"Shadowlord's Castle / Roar"	魔王ノ城／咆吼	4:14
13.	"Emil / Karma"	エミール／業苦	3:22
14.	"Emil / Sacrifice"	エミール／犠牲	3:27
15.	"Shadowlord"	魔王	5:25
16.	"Ashes of Dreams / New"	Ashes of Dreams／English Version	6:18
17.	"Ashes of Dreams / Nouveau"	Ashes of Dreams／Nouveau-French Version	5:47
18.	"Ashes of Dreams / Nuadhaich"	Ashes of Dreams／Nuadhaich-Gaelic Version	5:47
19.	"Ashes of Dreams / Aratanaru"	Ashes of Dreams／Aratanaru-Japanese Version	6:29
20.	"Shadowlord - White-note remix"	魔王 - White-note remix	4:56

==== NieR Gestalt & Replicant 15 Nightmares & Arrange Tracks ====
NieR Gestalt & Replicant 15 Nightmares & Arrange Tracks

Soundtrack album by Keiichi Okabe
- Released: December 8, 2010
- Genres: New age, techno
- Length: 54:43
- Label: Square Enix

An album of arranged music was published by Square Enix on December 8, 2010. The album, NieR Gestalt & Replicant 15 Nightmares & Arrange Tracks, contains 11 tracks across a length of 54:43, and has a catalog number of SQEX-10212. The arrangements were done by composers Okabe, Ishihama, and Hoashi, as well as by "oriori", Ryuichi Takada, and Hidekazu Tanaka. The first five arrangements, in a techno style, were included in the Nier DLC, while the remaining tracks are piano, instrumental, chiptune, and a cappella versions of tracks from the game. In the liner notes for the album, Okabe said that the DLC tracks were meant to be "more war-like" versions of the originals, while the second half of the album was intended to "maintain the image and worldview of the original music".

The arranged album reached number 59 on the Oricon music charts, a position it held for a week. It was warmly received by reviewers, if less so than the first album; Patrick Gann critiqued the album as not being as good as the original, though he noted that "you can still be awesome and rank second to that album". He concluded that the arrangements were all of good quality, but that listeners would not be "blown away by it". Don Kotowski found it to be an "accomplished arrange album", but inferior to the original as he felt that it was shorter than it should have been and that the final two tracks were weaker than the rest of the arrangements. Jayson Napolitano also felt that the album should have been longer; he thought that most listeners would skip the DLC tracks in favor of the acoustic arrangements, and that six tracks was not enough to carry the album given the expectations created by the quality of the original soundtrack.

Track list
No.	Title	Japanese title	Length
1.	"Song of the Ancients - Lost Androids Mixuxux"	イニシエノウタ - Lost Androids Mixuxux	5:35
2.	"Blu-bird - Hansel und Gretel"	青イ鳥 - Hansel und Gretel	5:05
3.	"Shadowlord's Castle - Iron Fist mix feat.DJ-BKO"	魔王ノ城 - Iron Fist mix feat.DJ-BKO	5:05
4.	"Emil - Ultimate Weapon No.7"	エミール - Ultimate Weapon No.7	5:34
5.	"Shadowlord - Crying Yonah Version"	魔王 - Crying Yonah Version	5:39
6.	"Emil / Piano Ver."	エミール/ピアノVer	4:02
7.	"Kainé / Duet Ver."	カイネ/重奏Ver	4:17
8.	"The Wretched Automatons / A Cappella"	愚カシイ機械/アカペラVer	3:32
9.	"Song of the Ancients / Piano Ver."	イニシエノウタ/ピアノVer	5:00
10.	"Shadowlord / Music Box Ver."	魔王/オルゴールVer	2:15
11.	"The Legend of Nier: 8-bit Heroes"	ニーアの伝説～8ビットの勇者たち～	8:39

==== NieR tribute album -echo- ====
NieR tribute album -echo-

Soundtrack album by Keiichi Okabe
- Released: September 14, 2011
- Genres: Electronic, klezmer (Shadowlord's Castle), new age
- Length: 1:00:46
- Label: Square Enix

On September 14, 2011 Square Enix published a third Nier album, titled NieR Tribute Album -echo-. Each of the 12 tracks on the album is a remix of a Nier piece, each by a different artist. The resulting eclectic mix of styles is primarily electronic, but also includes a multiple-piano arrangement of "Grandma" and a klezmer rendition of "Shadowlord's Castle". The album has a duration of 1:00:46, and has the catalog number SQEX-10247.

The album reached number 77 on the Oricon music charts, a position it held for a week. It was positively reviewed by Jayson Napolitano of Original Sound Version, who described himself as "impressed" with it. He preferred this album to the arranged album, though he felt that a few of the tracks had difficulty distinguishing themselves above the high quality of the original pieces.

Track list
No.	Title	Japanese title	Length
1.	"-echo-: NieR Repose "SEXY-SYNTHESIZER""	-echo-: NieR 休息 "SEXY-SYNTHESIZER"	6:28
2.	"-echo-: NieR Kainé / Salvation ~ Kainé / Escape "matryoshka""	-echo-: NieR カイネ／救済 〜 カイネ／逃避 "matryoshka"	3:24
3.	"-echo-: NieR Temple of Drifting Sands "millstones""	-echo-: NieR 流砂ノ神殿 "millstones"	5:03
4.	"-echo-: NieR Emil / Sacrifice "Ametsub""	-echo-: NieR エミール／犠牲 "Ametsub"	4:44
5.	"-echo-: NieR Suite Of Nier (Restructuring-Snow in Summer, The Ultimate Weapon, Ashes of Dreams) "Go-qualia""	-echo-: NieR Suite Of Nier (Restructuring-夏ノ雪, 最終兵器, Ashes of Dreams) "Go-qualia"	5:58
6.	"-echo-: NieR Shadowlord's Castle / Roar "RÄFVEN""	-echo-: NieR 魔王ノ城／咆吼 "RÄFVEN"	2:46
7.	"-echo-: NieR The Incomplete Stone "Nobu44""	-echo-: NieR 不完全ナ石 "Nobu44"	5:10
8.	"-echo-: NieR Song of the Ancients / Devola ~ Song of the Ancients / Popola "sasakure.UK""	-echo-: NieR イニシエノウタ／デボル 〜 イニシエノウタ／ポポル "sasakure.UK"	5:18
9.	"-echo-: NieR The Wretched Automatons "KanouKaoru""	-echo-: NieR 愚カシイ機械 "KanouKaoru"	3:52
10.	"-echo-: NieR Grandma "Schroeder-Headz""	-echo-: NieR オバアチャン "Schroeder-Headz"	4:22
11.	"-echo-: NieR The Lost Forest "NO‐NO₂""	-echo-: NieR 失ワレタ森 "NO‐NO₂"	5:10
12.	"-echo-: NieR Snow in Summer ~ The Dark Colossus Destroys All "world's end girlfriend""	-echo-: NieR 夏ノ雪〜 全テヲ破壊スル黒キ巨人 "world's end girlfriend"	8:31

==== Piano Collections Nier Gestalt & Replicant ====
Piano Collections Nier Gestalt & Replicant

Soundtrack album by Keiichi Okabe
- Released: March 21, 2012
- Genre: Piano instrumental
- Length: 45:42
- Label: Square Enix

On March 21, 2012 Square Enix published a fourth Nier album, titled Piano Collections Nier Gestalt & Replicant. Each of the 11 tracks on the album is a piano arrangement of a Nier piece. The tracks were arranged and played by several different artists, namely Keigo Hoashi, Kumi Tanioka, Masato Kouda, Ryuichi Takada, and Yuri Misumi. Each arranger performed their own pieces, with the exception of Kouda, whose arrangement was played by Tanioka. The album has a duration of 45:42, and has the catalog number SQEX-10303.

The album was positively reviewed by Jayson Napolitano of Original Sound Version, who said that while "nothing on this album came as particularly surprising", that he enjoyed the arrangements and performances. He preferred the tracks on this album to the piano arrangements on the 15 Nightmares album.

Track list
No.	Title	Japanese title	Length
1.	"-echo-: Song of the Ancients"	イニシエノウタ	4:08
2.	"Kainé"	カイネ	4:29
3.	"Hills of Radiant Wind"	光ノ風吹ク丘	3:40
4.	"Snow in Summer"	夏ノ雪	3:48
5.	"Emil"	エミール	3:24
6.	"Grandma"	オバアチャン	4:21
7.	"Repose"	休息	2:56
8.	"Gods Bound By Rules"	掟ニ囚ワレシ神	4:15
9.	"Shadowlord"	魔王	4:03
10.	"The Wretched Automatons"	愚カシイ機械	5:36
11.	"Ashes of Dreams"	Ashes of Dreams	5:02

==== NieR Gestalt & Replicant: Jazz Arrange version ====
NieR Gestalt & Replicant: Jazz Arrange version

Soundtrack album by Sean Schafianski
- Released: August 8, 2013
- Genre: Jazz
- Length: 26:48
- Label: Joypad Records

Music from Nier has been arranged into two jazz EPs. The albums, titled NieR Gestalt & Replicant: Jazz Arrange Version and Jazz Arrange Version Vol. 2, contain six tracks each from the soundtrack licensed by Joypad Records. The tracks are arranged and performed by Sean Schafianski, and were released digitally on August 8, 2013, and May 16, 2014. The EPs have durations of 26:48 and 25:33. The music is split between instrumental and vocal pieces, and covers multiple different styles of jazz music.

The first EP was positively reviewed by Brad Hayes-Raugh of RPGFan, who "greatly enjoyed the direction this album takes", though he did note that some of the pieces did not quite meet his high expectations. He concluded that "the tracks give a fresh spin on some great pieces of video game music and keep the spirit of Nier alive and well."

Track list

Jazz Arrange version
No.	Title	Original title	Length
1.	"Sunshower"	"Snow in Summer"	5:42
2.	"Pale Moonlight"	"Shadowlord's Castle/Roar"	4:07
3.	"Nightengale"	"Kainé/Duet Ver."	4:14
4.	"Memories"	"Song Of The Ancients/Devola"	4:54
5.	"A Heart Not Forgotten"	"Emil/Karma"	3:26
6.	"Steam Powered Trouble"	"The Wretched Automatons"	4:25

Jazz Arrange version Vol 2.
No.	Title	Original title	Length
1.	"Old Timer"	"Grandma"	3:24
2.	"Flower"	"Yonah"	4:09
3.	"Veil"	"The Prestigious Mask"	2:34
4.	"Rule Breaker"	"Gods Bound by Rules"	5:03
5.	"Heavy Heart"	"Emil-Piano Ver"	4:07
6.	"Penumbra"	"Shadowlord"	6:16

==== NieR Replicant ver.1.22474487139... ====
NieR Replicant ver.1.22474487139... Original Soundtrack

Soundtrack album by Keiichi Okabe
- Released: April 21, 2021
- Genres: New age, classical, Orchestra
- Length: 3:10:21
- Label: Square Enix

An updated version of the game, NieR Replicant ver.1.22474487139..., was released in April 2021. Okabe, Ryuichi Takada, Keigo Hoashi, Kuniyuki Takahashi, Shotaro Seo, and Oliver Good of Monaca arranged the music under Okabe's direction, with a goal of making them longer and higher-quality than the originals rather than making them very different. The team wanted to give a "sense of renewal" with the pieces, and made sure not to change the "tone" of the songs, but added live instruments and choral elements. For example, in "Kainé / Salvation", more live instrumentation gave what they felt was a "richer sound", and where the original looped to start over the updated version instead repeats with slight changes and additions. A soundtrack album, NieR Replicant ver.1.22474487139... Original Soundtrack, was released alongside it on April 21, containing 45 tracks on three discs with a total length of 3:10:21. Some of the tracks were also included in the NieR Replicant – 10+1 Years set of four vinyl LPs, which has 29 tracks from NieR Replicant ver.1.22474487139... Original Soundtrack along with all other previous arranged and orchestral albums, as well as four new arrangements.

===== Weiss Edition =====
An album named NieR Replicant ver.1.22474487139... Soundtrack "Weiss Edition" is included in the collector version of the game, NieR Replicant ver.1.22474487139... White Snow Edition. It features a special soundtrack with newly-recorded and arranged music.

Disc 1
No.	Title	Length
1.	"Snow In Summer - Another Edit Version"	4:49
2.	"Hills Of Radiant Winds - Another Edit Version"	3:52
3.	"Kainé - Another Edit Version"	4:20
4.	"Gods Bound By Rules - Another Edit Version"	4:36
5.	"Deep Crimson Foe - Another Edit Version"	6:00
6.	"Emil - Another Edit Version"	6:07
7.	"Fleeting Words - Another Edit Version"	4:56
8.	"Song Of The Ancients - Another Edit Version"	6:27
9.	"Shadowlord - Another Edit Version"	5:16
10.	"Analogous Memories - Another Edit Version"	5:15

Disc 2
No.	Title	Length
1.	"Kainé - Weiss Edition Arrangement"	4:39
2.	"Analogous Memories - Weiss Edition Arrangement"	4:45
3.	"The Wretched Automatons - Weiss Edition Arrangement"	5:53
4.	"Grandma - Weiss Edition Arrangement"	4:22
5.	"Song Of The Ancients - Weiss Edition Arrangement"	6:04
6.	"City Of Commerce - Weiss Edition Arrangement"	4:27
7.	"Hills Of Radiant Winds - Weiss Edition Arrangement"	4:04
8.	"Temple Of Drifting Sands - Weiss Edition Arrangement"	4:14
9.	"Fleeting Words - Weiss Edition Arrangement"	4:35
10.	"Ashes Of Dreams - Weiss Edition Arrangement"	5:03

=== Nier: Automata ===
==== NieR: Automata Original Soundtrack ====
NieR: Automata Original Soundtrack

Soundtrack album by MONACA
- Released: March 29, 2017
- Genres: New age, classical, orchestra
- Length: 3:33:43
- Label: Square Enix

A sequel to Nier, Nier: Automata, was released in February 2017. Its music was again composed by Keiichi Okabe and the Monaca team, with Emi Evans, J'Nique Nicole, and Nami Nakagawa on vocals, Takanori Goto on guitar, and additional contributions by several artists. A soundtrack album for the game was released worldwide by Square Enix on March 29, 2017. The three-disc, 3:33:43-long album contains all of the music from the game, as well as, like the original game's album, variations on the main theme in multiple languages. Unlike the original Nier, where all of the versions were written and sung by Emi Evans and had the same lyrical meanings, the versions in Automata were written and sung by multiple people: the English version by J'Nique Nicole, one in an invented French-derived language by Evans, and the Japanese written by Yoko Taro and sung by Marina Kawano.

NieR: Automata Original Soundtrack peaked at number 2 on the Oricon charts, with over 28,000 copies sold in its first week in Japan. It was well received by critics; Patrick Gann of RPGFan said the album was as good or better than the original as well as "perfectly, wonderfully great".

Disc 1
No.	Title	Japanese title	Length
1.	"Significance - Nothing"	意味／無	2:39
2.	"City Ruins - Rays of Light"	遺サレタ場所／斜光	6:22
3.	"Peaceful Sleep"	穏ヤカナ眠リ	6:50
4.	"Memories of Dust"	砂塵ノ記憶	5:29
5.	"Birth of a Wish"	生マレ出ヅル意思	4:40
6.	"The Color of Depression"	沈痛ノ色	3:17
7.	"Amusement Park"	遊園施設	6:19
8.	"A Beautiful Song"	美シキ歌	4:06
9.	"Voice of no Return - Guitar"	還ラナイ声／ギター	3:51
10.	"Grandma - Destruction"	オバアチャン／破壊	5:31
11.	"Faltering Prayer - Dawn Breeze"	澱ンダ祈リ／暁風	3:12
12.	"Emil's Shop"	エミール／ショップ	5:28
13.	"Treasured Times"	大切ナ時間	3:46
14.	"Vague Hope - Cold Rain"	曖昧ナ希望／氷雨	3:36
15.	"Weight of the World English Version"	Weight of the World／English Version	5:44

Disc 2
No.	Title	Japanese title	Length
1.	"Significance"	意味	2:39
2.	"City Ruins - Shade"	遺サレタ場所／遮光	6:01
3.	"End of the Unknown"	異形ノ末路	4:31
4.	"Voice of no Return - Normal"	還ラナイ声／通常	2:53
5.	"Pascal"	パスカル	4:47
6.	"Forest Kingdom"	森ノ王国	5:52
7.	"Dark Colossus - Kaiju"	全テヲ破壊スル黒キ巨人／怪獣	6:06
8.	"Copied City"	複製サレタ街	3:59
9.	"Wretched Weaponry: Medium/Dynamic"	愚カシイ兵器：乙：甲	7:04
10.	"Possessed by Disease"	取リ憑イタ業病	5:02
11.	"Broken Heart"	割レタ心	3:30
12.	"Wretched Weaponry: Quiet"	愚カシイ兵器：丙	3:07
13.	"Mourning"	追悼	4:51
14.	"Dependent Weakling"	依存スル弱者	5:06
15.	"Weight of the World Song of a Broken World"	Weight of the World／壊レタ世界ノ歌	5:44

Disc 3
No.	Title	Japanese title	Length
1.	"Rebirth & Hope"	再生ト希望	0:37
2.	"War & War"	戦争ト戦争	4:32
3.	"Crumbling Lies - Front"	崩壊ノ虚妄	3:26
4.	"Widespread Illness"	茫洋タル病	3:18
5.	"Fortress of Lies"	偽リノ城塞	2:49
6.	"Vague Hope - Spring Rain"	曖昧ナ希望／翠雨	4:40
7.	"Song of the Ancients - Atonement"	イニシエノウタ／贖罪	5:09
8.	"Blissful Death"	幸セナ死	2:36
9.	"Emil - Despair"	エミール／絶望	4:46
10.	"Faltering Prayer - Starry Sky"	澱ンダ祈リ／星空	3:44
11.	"Alien Manifestation"	顕現シタ異物	6:27
12.	"The Tower"	「塔」	7:43
13.	"Bipolar Nightmare"	双極ノ悪夢	5:00
14.	"The Sound of the End"	終ワリノ音	5:26
15.	"Weight of the World Nouveau - FR Version"	Weight of the World／Nouveau-FR Version	5:47
16.	"Weight of the World the End of YoRHa"	Weight of the World／the End of YoRHa	5:39

===== Hacking tracks =====
NieR: Automata Original Soundtrack HACKING TRACKS

Soundtrack album by MONACA
- Released: March 29, 2017
- Genre: Chiptune
- Length: 46:07
- Label: Square Enix

On March 29, 2017, NieR: Automata Original Soundtrack HACKING TRACKS, a collection of chiptune 8-bit music consisted of 16 different tracks, was released. The tracks included in the album were used in hacking minigames of NieR: Automata. It was released as a pre-order bonus for the original soundtrack of NieR: Automata. The album was composed by Monaca team and arranged by Shotaro Seo of Monaca. The one-disc album has a duration of 46:07, and has the catalog number SQEX-10593.

The album was positively reviewed by Patrick Gann of RPGFan, who said that "NieR: Automata fans that got this album with their OSTs ought to count their blessings". Tien Hoang of VGMOnline believed that it is "a nice bonus album to have, but it isn't essential".

Disc 1
No.	Title	Japanese title	Length
1.	"City Ruins - 8-bit"	遺サレタ場所：丁	2:12
2.	"Memories of Dust - 8-bit"	砂塵ノ記憶：丁	2:31
3.	"Birth of a Wish - 8-bit"	生マレ出ヅル意思：丁	3:02
4.	"Amusement Park - 8-bit"	遊園施設：丁	2:23
5.	"A Beautiful Song - 8-bit"	美シキ歌：丁	2:33
6.	"End of the Unknown - 8-bit"	異形ノ末路：丁	2:52
7.	"Forest Kingdom - 8-bit"	森ノ王国：丁	2:26
8.	"Dark Colossus - Kaiju - 8-bit"	全テヲ破壊スル黒キ巨人/怪獣：丁	2:15
9.	"Wretched Weaponry - 8-bit"	愚カシイ兵器：丁	3:03
10.	"Possessed by Disease - 8-bit"	取リ憑イタ業病：丁	4:15
11.	"Dependent Weakling - 8-bit"	依存スル弱者：丁	2:40
12.	"War & War - 8-bit"	戦争ト戦争：丁	2:27
13.	"Song of the Ancients - Atonement - 8-bit"	イニシエノウタ/贖罪：丁	3:08
14.	"The Tower - 8-bit"	「塔」：丁	3:38
15.	"The Sound of the End - 8-bit"	終ワリノ音：丁	2:40
16.	"Weight of the World - 8-bit"	Weight of the World：丁	4:02
Total length:			46:07

==== NieR:Automata Arranged & Unreleased Tracks ====
NieR:Automata Arranged & Unreleased Tracks

Soundtrack album by MONACA
- Released: December 20, 2017
- Genres: New age, techno
- Length: 1:43:39
- Label: Square Enix

On December 20, 2017, an album of arranged music and unreleased tracks of NieR: Automata was released by Square Enix in two discs. Disc one included arranged music by different artists, and unreleased tracks composed by Keiichi Okabe were included in disc two. The album consists of a total of 20 tracks, has a duration of 1:43:39, and has the catalog number SQEX-10631~2.

The album was praised by Patrick Gann of RPGFan, who believed that some tracks, such as "Weight of the World" and "Emil", were "very impressive".

Disc 1
No.	Title	Japanese title	Length
1.	"City Ruins (Arranged by AJURIKA)"	遺サレタ場所 Arranged by AJURIKA	4:00
2.	"Peaceful Sleep (Arranged by Cheng Bi Meets Masato Ishinari)"	穏ヤカナ眠リ Arranged by Cheng Bi meets Masato Ishinari	3:58
3.	"Amusement Park (Arranged by arai tasuku) [feat. momocashew]"	遊園施設 Arranged by arai tasuku feat.momocashew from Mili	6:43
4.	"End of the Unknown (Arranged by ATOLS)"	異形ノ末路 Arranged by ATOLS	4:36
5.	"Pascal (Arranged by Ryu Kawamura)"	パスカル Arranged by Ryu Kawamura	5:15
6.	"Copied City (Arranged by LITE)"	複製サレタ街 Arranged by LITE	3:58
7.	"Mourning (Arranged by Sachiko Miyano)"	追悼 Arranged by Sachiko Miyano	6:49
8.	"Vague Hope (Arranged by Takuro Iga)"	曖昧ナ希望 Arranged by Takuro Iga	5:16
9.	"Song of the Ancients - Atonement (Arranged by Jun Hayakawa with Atsuki Yoshida [EMO Quartet])"	イニシエノウタ Arranged by Jun Hayakawa with Atsuki Yoshida(EMO Quartet)	4:18
10.	"Emil (Arranged by Morrigan & Lily)"	エミール Arranged by Morrigan & Lily	6:07
11.	"Alien Manifestation (Arranged by Yutaka Oyama, Junichi Saito, Yusuke Shima, Jose Colon)"	顕現シタ異物 Arranged by Yutaka Oyama・Junichi Saito・Yusuke Shima・Jose Colon	4:17
12.	"Weight of the World (Arranged by ZANIO)"	Weight of the World Arranged by ZANIO	5:28
Total length:			60:45

Disc 2
No.	Title	Japanese title	Length
1.	"Umare Iduru Ishi/ Konomama ja Dame"	生マレ出ヅル意思/コノママジャダメ	5:22
2.	"Birth of a Wish/ This cannot continue"	Birth of a Wish/This cannot continue	5:22
3.	"Umare Iduru Ishi/ Kami ni Natta"	生マレ出ヅル意思/カミニナッタ	5:22
4.	"Birth of a Wish/ Become a God"	Birth of a Wish/Become a God	5:22
5.	"Birth of a Wish/ CEO (Solo)"	生マレ出ヅル意思/社長（ソロ）	5:22
6.	"Birth of a Wish/ CEO (Duet)"	生マレ出ヅル意思/社長（デュエット）	5:22
7.	"Toritsuita Goubyou/ Kami ni Natta"	取リ憑イタ業病/カミニナッタ	5:22
8.	"Possessed by Disease/ Become a God"	Possessed by Disease/Become a God	5:20
Total length:			42:54

==== NieR: Automata Piano Collections ====
NieR: Automata Piano Collections

Soundtrack album by MONACA
- Released: April 25, 2018
- Genre: Piano instrumental
- Length: 1:01:07
- Label: Square Enix

NieR: Automata Piano Collections was published on April 25, 2018. The album contains 12 tracks across a length of 1:01:07 and has a catalog number of SQEX-10653. The tracks in the album are originally from NieR: Automata Original Soundtrack but transformed into piano renditions.

Patrick Gann of RPGFan said the album "is the weakest of the Automata albums Square Enix has released so far". Don Kotowski of VGMOnline believed the album is "by no means a bad album", but said "it is missing that spark".

Disc 1
No.	Title	Japanese title	Length
1.	"Weight of the World"	Weight of the World	6:17
2.	"Amusement Park"	遊園施設	6:55
3.	"A Beautiful Song"	美シキ歌	5:07
4.	"City Ruins"	遺サレタ場所	3:48
5.	"Dependent Weakling"	依存スル弱者	4:18
6.	"Peaceful Sleep"	穏ヤカナ眠リ	4:54
7.	"Copied City"	複製サレタ街	4:21
8.	"Voice of no Return"	還ラナイ声	3:56
9.	"Bipolar Nightmare"	双極ノ悪夢	4:23
10.	"The Tower"	「塔」	5:09
11.	"The Sound of the End"	終ワリノ音	6:03
12.	"Vague Hope"	曖昧ナ希望	5:56
Total length:			61:07

=== Orchestral albums ===
NieR: Gestalt & NieR: Replicant Orchestral Arrangement Album NieR: Automata Orchestral Arrangement Album

Soundtrack album by MONACA, Kanagawa Philharmonic Orchestra
- Released: September 12, 2018
- Genre: Orchestra
- Length: 50:48 (Nier); 49:37 (Automata)
- Label: Square Enix

On September 12, 2018, Square Enix released a pair of orchestral albums, NieR: Gestalt & NieR: Replicant Orchestral Arrangement Album and NieR: Automata Orchestral Arrangement Album. Each contains performances by the Kanagawa Philharmonic Orchestra of arrangements of music from each game, and were available individually or as a box set. NieR: Gestalt & NieR: Replicant Orchestral Arrangement Album contains 11 tracks, has a duration of 50:48 and the catalog number SQEX-10673. 10 tracks are included in NieR: Automata Orchestral Arrangement Album across a length of 49:37. The album has the catalog number SQEX-10674. The box set contains a further four tracks using different instrumental ensembles.

NieR: Gestalt & NieR: Replicant Orchestral Arrangement Album was reviewed positively by Tien Hoang of VGMOnline, who believed that it "is a solid addition" to the music catalog of NieR. Patrick Gann of RPGFan criticized NieR: Automata Orchestral Arrangement Album and believed that the choice of tracks included in the album could have been better. He called this album "disappointing". In his review of the box set, Hoang felt that the additional tracks were the most creative, and wished the other arrangements had followed suit.

NieR Gestalt & Replicant Orchestral Arrangement Album
No.	Title	Japanese title	Length
1.	"Snow in Summer"	夏ノ雪	4:51
2.	"Song of the Ancients"	イニシエノウタ	5:17
3.	"Hills of Radiant Winds"	光ノ風吹ク丘	4:11
4.	"Emil"	エミール	5:07
5.	"Gods Bound by Rules"	掟ニ囚ワレシ神	5:13
6.	"The Wretched Automatons"	愚カシイ機械	5:26
7.	"Kainé"	カイネ	4:37
8.	"The Dark Colossus Destroys All"	全テヲ破壊スル黒キ巨人	3:10
9.	"Grandma"	オバアチャン	4:30
10.	"Shadowlord"	魔王	4:57
11.	"Ashes of Dreams"	Ashes of Dreams	3:29
Total length:			50:48

NieR: Automata Orchestral Arrangement Album
No.	Title	Japanese title	Length
1.	"City Ruins"	遺サレタ場所	5:32
2.	"Amusement Park"	遊園施設	5:32
3.	"A Beautiful Song"	美シキ歌	4:32
4.	"Alien Manifestation"	顕現シタ異物	4:29
5.	"The Tower"	「塔」	6:03
6.	"Dependent Weakling"	依存スル弱者	3:55
7.	"Bipolar Nightmare"	双極ノ悪夢	4:33
8.	"Mourning"	追悼	5:05
9.	"The Sound of the End"	終ワリノ音	5:10
10.	"Weight of the World"	Weight of the World	5:32
Total length:			49:37

==== Addendum ====
To correspond with the NieR Theatrical Orchestra 12020 concerts celebrating the 10th anniversary of the game series, Square Enix released another album of orchestral arrangements, NieR Orchestral Arrangement Album – Addendum, on March 25, 2020. It contains five tracks each from Gestalt & Replicant and Automata, arranged by Sachiko Miyano and Kosuke Yamashita and featuring solo vocal performances from Emi Evans and J’Nique Nicole. The first printing of the physical version of the album includes a bonus disc with three additional arrangements. The album was reviewed by Tien Hoang of VGMOnline, who found the tracks and performances solid but was disappointed that they stayed even more closely to the original pieces than the other orchestral albums, rather than having more creative arrangements, to the point of reusing some prior arrangements with minor differences.

=== NieR: Piano Journeys ===
An album of piano versions of songs from Nier, Nier: Automata, and Nier Reincarnation was published by Square Enix on April 16, 2025 as NieR: Piano Journeys to celebrate the 15-year anniversary of the first game. The album contains ten tracks performed by Benyamin Nuss, with a total duration of 50:40 and a catalog number of SQEX-11167. Matt Wardell of RPGFan, in a review of the album, found both the arrangements and Nuss's playing to be incredible.

== Music videos ==
On July 15, 2015, an officially licensed arrangement of "Song of the Ancients" from Nier, along with a music video, were released by OverClocked Records. It was made available to stream or purchase. The song, a vocal performance with vibraphone and percussion, was the first officially licensed video game music single by the record label, an offshoot of the OverClocked ReMix video game music remix community. The single was sung by Jillian Aversa, who features in the accompanying music video, with percussion by Doug Perry. The song was performed by the duo prior to release at Video Games Live concerts, and was filmed at National Harbor, Maryland by the sculpture The Awakening in January 2015 during MAGFest, an annual game music convention.

== Public performances ==
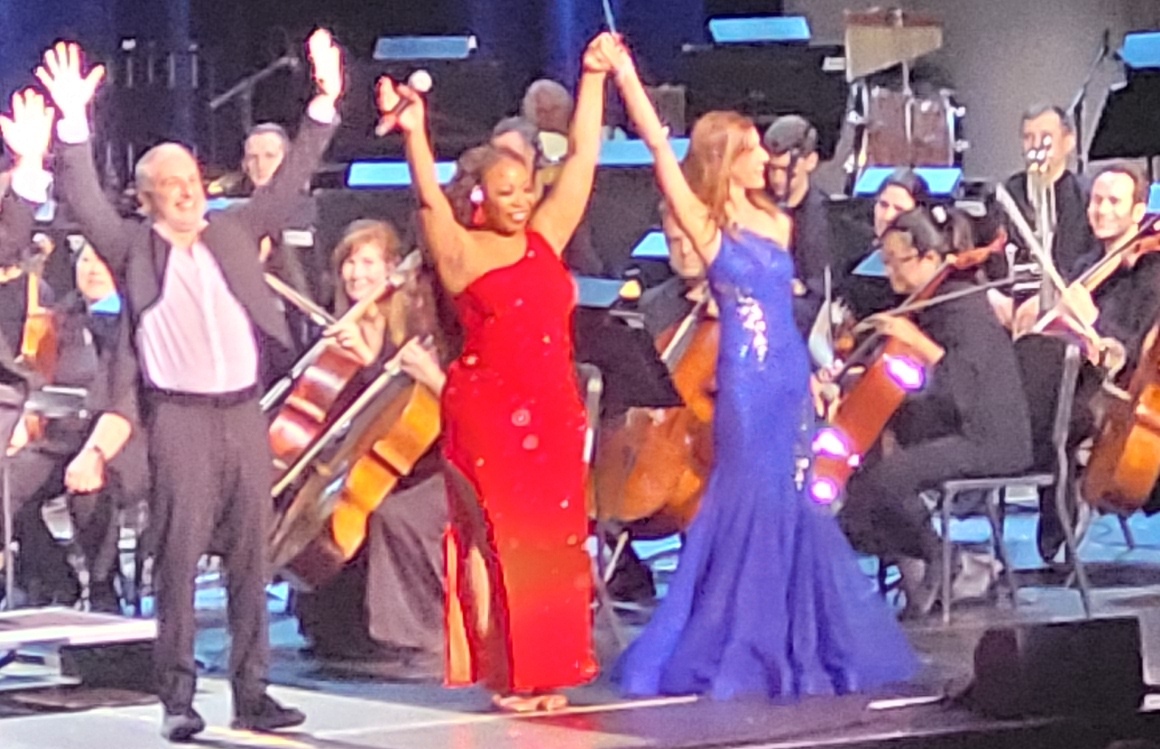
J'Nique Nicole (left, in red) and Emi Evans (right, in blue) at a NieR Orchestra Concert in October 2024

A concert in Tokyo, called "Nier Music Concert & Talk Live", was held at the Ex Theater Roppongi on April 16, 2016, with performances of various musical pieces from Nier and Nier: Automata. A Blu-ray of this performance was released on December 14, 2016. A second concert was held on May 5, 2017 and was livestreamed via Niconico. A concert tour, NieR:Orchestra Concert 12024 [the end of data], was performed worldwide from January 2024 through January 2025.

The Addendum version of "Song of the Ancients" was played during the Parade of Nations of the 2020 Summer Olympics opening ceremony. A routine set to "A Beautiful Song" was performed by the Japanese artistic swimming team during the 2024 Summer Olympics on August 7, 2024.
