= Cyber Hunter =

2019 video game

- Developer: NetEase
- Publisher: NetEase
- Composers: Keiichi Okabe; Ryuichi Takada
- Engine: NeoX
- Platforms: Android; iOS; Microsoft Windows
- Release: WW: 26 April 2019; Win: 2 July 2019
- Genre: Battle royale
- Mode: Multiplayer

Cyber Hunter was a 2019 Chinese sci-fi battle royale video game for mobiles and PC platforms developed and distributed by NetEase. It was released on 26 April 2019, until its servers were shut down on July 23, 2024.

The mobile app of Cyber Hunter was banned in India (along with other Chinese apps) on 2 September 2020 by the government, the move came amid the 2020 China-India skirmish.

== Release ==
The game was announced as Project:Battle by NetEase in May 2018 and initially released in October 2018 as beta test on Android and iOS mobile platforms and released globally on 26 April 2019.

== Gameplay ==
The gameplay consists of traditional battle royale format with futuristic theme and some distinct elements such as players (referred in-game as Wanderers) are dropped on jet-fueled hoverboards which aid in landing early, fancy weapons such as microwave guns, weaponized vehicles, vertical climbing, parkour, gliding through the air using droids which are AI robots, building various structures for defense, detailed customization of characters, etc.

== Reception ==
Josh Ye of AbacusNews.com criticizes Cyber Hunter for its lack of creativity and core innovation, calling it another PUBG Mobile clone. The game has borrowed many mechanics from several other games such as climbing, gliding and battlefield design from The Legend of Zelda: Breath of the Wild. Ash Mayhew of DroidGamers.com praises the game for genuine innovation in battle royale genre such as letting players create their own playing style. There are many strategic options at players' disposal when stuck in a combat.
