= Kobe Design University =

Private university in Kobe, Hyōgo, Japan

Coordinates: 34°40′39″N 135°03′25″E

- 神戸芸術工科大学
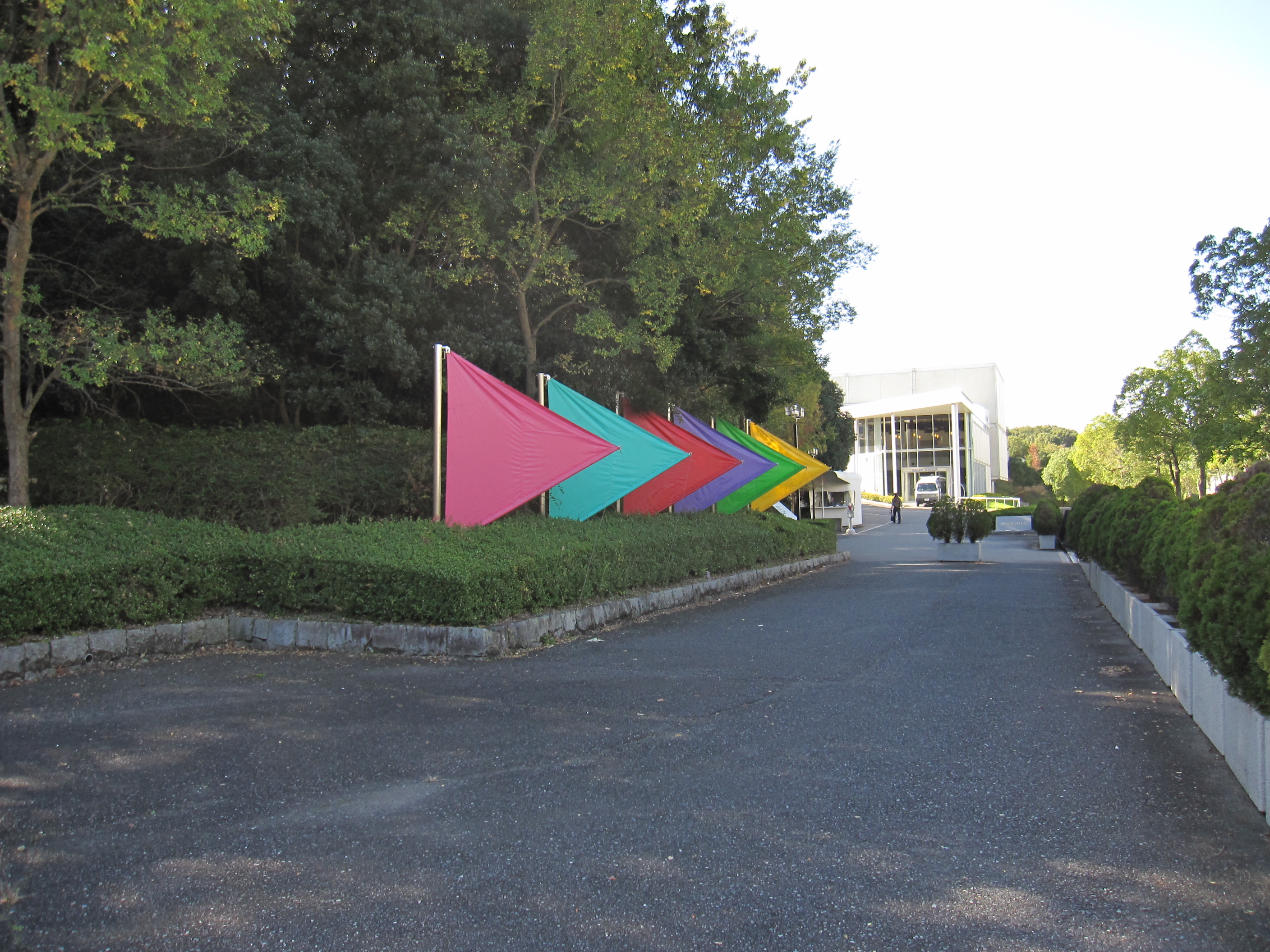
- Type: Private
- Established: 1989
- Location: Kobe, Hyōgo, Japan
- Website: www.kobe-du.ac.jp/en/

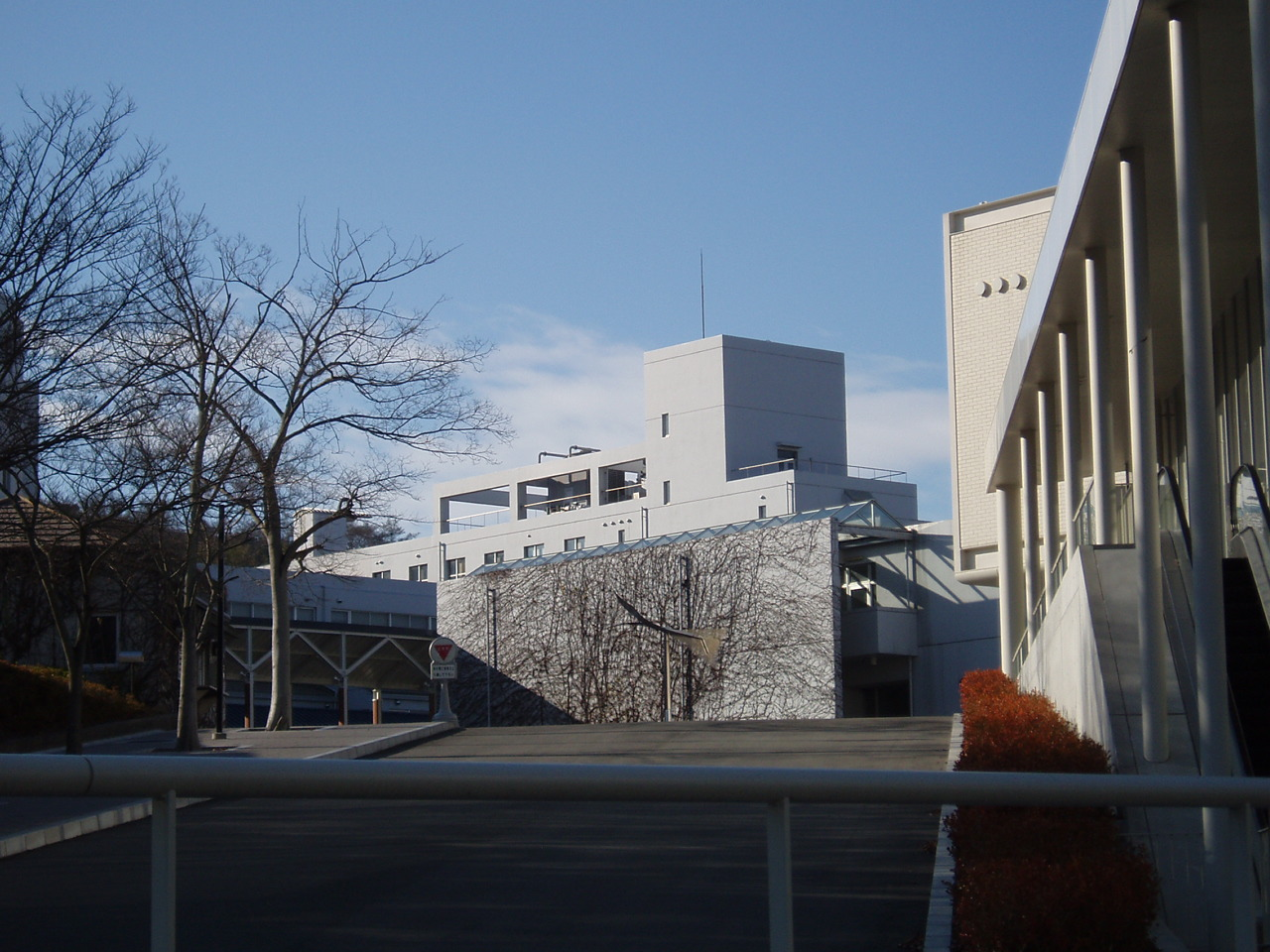
Kobe Design University in winter

Kobe Design University (神戸芸術工科大学, Kōbe geijutsu kōka daigaku) is a private university in Kobe, Hyōgo, Japan.

It was established in 1989 by Tanioka Gakuen Educational Foundation (谷岡学園, founded in 1928), which runs several schools such as Osaka University of Commerce.

== Undergraduate schools ==
- School of Progressive Arts
  - Department of Media Arts
  - Department of Plastic Arts
- School of Design
  - Department of Visual Design
  - Department of Fashion and Textile Design
  - Department of Product Design
  - Department of Environmental Design

== Graduate schools ==
- Integrated Arts Division (Master's courses)
- Integrated Design Division (Master's courses)
- Arts and Design Division (Doctoral courses)

== Notable alumni ==
- Kiyohiko Azuma – manga artist
- Keiichi Okabe – video game composer
- Yoko Taro – video game director
