= Voice of Cards: The Forsaken Maiden =

- Developer: Alim
- Publisher: Square Enix
- Directors: Maasa Mimura; Yoko Taro
- Artist: Kimihiko Fujisaka
- Writer: Yuki Wada
- Composers: Oliver Good; Shotaro Seo; Keiichi Okabe
- Series: Voice of Cards
- Platforms: Nintendo Switch; PlayStation 4; Windows; Android; iOS
- Release: PlayStation 4, Nintendo Switch, Windows; February 17, 2022; Android, iOS; March 23, 2023
- Genre: Role-playing
- Modes: Single-player, multiplayer

Voice of Cards: The Forsaken Maiden (Note: Japanese: Voice of Cards: できそこないの巫女, Hepburn: Boisu ofu Kādo: Deki Sokonai no Miko) is a 2022 role-playing video game developed by Alim and published by Square Enix for PlayStation 4, Nintendo Switch and Windows. It was released for Android and iOS in 2023. Using the aesthetic of a tabletop role-playing game, the player controls a young man who escorts a magical maiden on her quest to collect relics and protect their home from destruction. Gameplay involves travelling between towns, completing story quests and fighting in turn-based battles.

Following the release of Voice of Cards: The Isle Dragon Roars in 2021, Alim began development on a second game, with creator Yosuke Saito intending it as the next entry in a longer series. The first game's staff returned including creative director Yoko Taro, artist Kimihiko Fujisaka and music team Monaca. Production lasted four months. While using the same gameplay and world, it told a different story, which writer Yuki Wada made more melancholy. Reception was generally positive, with critics noting improvements to the story over the first Voice of Cards in addition to the artwork and narrative, but noting a lack of innovation in its gameplay. A follow-up, Voice of Cards: The Beasts of Burden, was released in September 2022.

== Gameplay ==
A battle in Voice of Cards: The Forsaken Maiden

Voice of Cards: The Forsaken Maiden is a role-playing video game which presents its world, characters and battles in the style of a tabletop role-playing game; everything is represented using cards, with the player navigating environments as a game piece. The game is split into four acts, each having a self-contained narrative tying into the main plot. The player explores different islands using a boat, with areas blocked off until certain story events are completed. Much of the game uses a linear structure, with only the last two island narratives able to be tackled in any order.

The environments are split between towns, the overworld, and dungeons. During navigation, the player uncovers the map through flipping adjacent cards, sometimes triggering random events and finding treasure chests. In towns, players can engage in a card-based minigame, with the aim being to match card types and scores while working with or around random card effects, with the winner having the highest score. The card minigame supports four-person local multiplayer.

Battles play out through both scripted and random encounters with a party of four controlled by the player; protagonists Barren and Laty, and two other characters dictated by the storyline. During combat, the player can perform standard attacks, use items, and perform skills using gems generated once per turn and added to a pool. Some skill effects are dictated by rolling a dice. Alongside single-character skills, characters with strong bonds can perform high-cost Link Skills. During some battles, happenstance cards are triggered, granting an effect to both the player and the enemy party. Damage from attacks is calculated using the attack and defense values on each card, while each character can only have one positive and one negative status effect at a time. Upon winning, the party is awarded with gold and experience points, with leveling up raising a character's health and attributes.

== Synopsis ==
On Omega Isle, which is destined to be destroyed since it has no Maiden to safeguard its guardian spirit, protagonist Barren builds a boat to sail the ocean and looks after Laty, a mute girl who was found by him on the shore. After fighting monsters for a payment of food, he learns from a diary of Laty's that she is a Maiden. Going to Omega Isle's shrine with her, they are met by the spirit Lac, who reveals Laty was meant to be Omega Isle's Maiden but failed and must now find four other Maidens and acquire relics from them to prevent Omega Isle's destruction. Barren leaves with Laty, though Omega Isle's mayor Greith believes destruction is their destiny. With each Maiden and attendant encountered, Barren and Laty work to heal scars on Laty's heart in the Heart's Domain, source of human emotion.

Each Maiden has their own arc. The Azure Maiden Phia completes her passage and sacrifices herself to preserve the Island, then her attendant Hyd reveals his hatred for her as he was forced to be her lover. The Crimson Maiden L'via and her attendant Gladio must fight in an arena to win the respect of their people, with L'via dressing as a boy to accomplish this. The island of the Onyx Maiden Queni and her attendant Blight is dying after multiple failed rituals, and while Barren and Laty help fend off a monster attack Queni dies giving birth to her child with Blight. The Ivory Maiden Lanca and her attendant Crym help them despite being forbidden from interacting with outsiders, and an attempt to save Lanca from punishment reveals her to be one of many artificial Maidens to ensure her island's prosperity. Lanca and Crym sacrifices themselves to allow Barren and Laty to escape. During their travels, Barren learns that Laty suffered abuse from the villagers of her home when her Maiden training went poorly, including her father; her home was Omega Isle, and her father Greith.

Back on Omega Isle, Laty's final healing of her Heart's Domain is foiled by a manifestation of her doubts, then Omega Isle is attacked by the Island Eater, a monster kept at bay by the island spirits. With help from L'via and Gladio, they hold the Island Eater back, inspiring the islanders to help kill it. The Mayor then reveals Laty's cruel treatment by Greith and the villagers was to scar her heart and spare her the Maiden's fate. Barren and Laty heal her Heart's Domain, and Laty confesses her love for Barren, allowing her to become a true Maiden and merge the other Maidens' relics into a single powerful relic. Lac then turns on them, corrupting the Heart's Domain and capturing Laty. Barren, aided by Greith and the spirit of Laty's mother, rescues Laty and confronts Lac. Lac, also called the Spirit Sovereign, reveals that the spirits have grown tired of sacrifices and want an eternal refuge, which he selected Laty to become. After Barren and Laty defeat the merged form of Lac and the Spirits, which severely damages the Heart's Domain, Laty agrees to become an eternal vessel for them. To heal the Heart's Domain, Latty is forced to give up two of her three most precious memories―her family, her friends, or her love for Barren―before falling into an eternal sleep which preserves the Spirits and their islands. In an epilogue set centuries later, a child visits the sleeping Laty with Barren's weapon left by her side.

== Development and release ==
Square Enix staff member Yosuke Saito had always intended Voice of Cards to be a series of games, though he initially kept this a secret from the public during the 2021 release of Voice of Cards: The Isle Dragon Roars. Following the release of The Isle Dragon Roars, the team got generally positive feedback, though its slow speed was a recurring complaint. Production of The Forsaken Maiden lasted just four months; the short turnover was attributed by Saito to the eagerness of developer Alim's young staff, and having The Isle Dragon Roars as a mechanical foundation. Returning staff included creative director Yoko Taro, lead director Maasa Mimura, Saito as executive producer, and artist Kimihiko Fujisaka. Due to the shortened production cycle, there were some stressful periods, with Yoko remembering Matsuo's work on the scenario being influenced by the long hours. Comparing the game to real-world tabletop games, which had a reputation for complicated rules, Yoko said that Alim's staff aimed to simplify the experience for genre newcomers.

While The Forsaken Maiden and The Isle Dragon Roars shared a fictional setting, their stories were not directly connected so new players could enjoy the story. The bulk of the scenario was written by Yuki Wada. Compared to the traditional yet "twisted" narrative of The Isle Dragon Roars, the scenario of The Forsaken Maiden was written to be more straightforward and understandable. It was also more melancholy, having a greater focus on drama and emotion over comedy. The bonds between maidens and their attendants was the central theme of the story, informing the gameplay concept of Link Skills. The gamemaster is voiced by Mark Atherlay in English and Show Hayami in Japanese. Yoko chose Hayami as he liked the sound of his voice when paired with the tone of Matsuo's story. For the character designs, Wada wrote an outline for each chapter, gave this to Fujisaka to design characters based on them, then adjusted the personality of each character to fir Fujisaka's design. Fujisaka aimed for a more original style than with The Isle Dragon Roars, which was inspired by classic RPGs. He had difficulty finishing the large number of illustrations, though some were simplified by basing them on characters created for The Isle Dragon Roars. He designed the Maidens and their attendants as contrasting yet complementary pairs.

The Forsaken Maiden was announced on February 4, 2022. The announcement covered its premise, characters, and worldwide release on February 17 for PlayStation 4, Nintendo Switch and Windows. Alongside the game, downloadable content was released with additional designs for card backs and the player's game piece. One set including visual themes, reworked character designs and music based on Nier: Automata (2017). It was ported to Android and iOS on March 23, 2023. A third entry in the Voice of Cards series, Voice of Cards: The Beasts of Burden, released in October 2022. A bundle of all three games was released alongside the mobile ports.

=== Music ===
As with The Isle Dragon Roars, the music of The Forsaken Maiden was co-composed by Oliver Good, Shotaro Seo and Keiichi Okabe of music studio Monaca. Also returning were violinist Mitsuri Shimada and vocalists Yukino Orita and Kocho, with Seo contributing male choral vocals. The guitar parts were performed by Takanori Goto. While the first Voice of Cards used a "straightforward" Celtic-inspired style to create a fantasy feel, The Forsaken Maiden also added elements of Latin music, such as a tango for melancholy moments and a samba to create an upbeat feeling. A soundtrack album was released by Square Enix on March 3, 2022.

== Reception ==
Reception

Aggregate score
Aggregator	Score
Metacritic	79/100 (NS); 75/100 (PS4)

Review scores
Publication	Score
Hardcore Gamer	4/5
Jeuxvideo.com	15/20
Nintendo Life	8/10
Nintendo World Report	7.5/10
Push Square	7/10
RPGamer	3.5/5
RPGFan	80%

On review aggregate website Metacritic, the game was given a score of 79 points out of 100 on Switch and 75 on PS4, based on 15 and 12 reviews respectively; both ratings indicated "generally favorable" reviews. Many critics felt it was an improvement over The Isle Dragon Roars, though lacking innovation.

Chris Sheeve of Hardcore Gamer cited the story as more captivating than that of The Isle Dragon Roars, being impressed mostly by the individual Maidens' story arcs. Jeuxvideo.com likewise noted the story as an improvement, noting an increase in drama over comedy and surprising plot twists. Nintendo Life's Mitch Vogel praised the improved story pacing, while Jordan Rudek of Nintendo World Report also praised the pacing but found the main story lacking in its emotional impact despite enjoying the smaller narratives. Stephen Tailby of Push Square enjoyed the storyline, though made little comment in the review. RPGamer's Alex Fuller positively noted the story's darker tone, praising the overall pacing as adding to the tone and delivery. Abraham Kobylanski of RPGFan positively compared the overall tone to Yoko's work on Nier despite criticising some late-game plot twists.

Sheeve called the music "simply fantastic", while Jeuxvideo.com felt praised both Fujisaka's character artwork and Monaca's soundtrack. Vogel said the game's visual design created "a thoroughly engrossing and imaginative atmosphere", praising the character art for its expressive designs despite some platform-specific technical performance issues. Rudek also noted performance issues on Switch, and felt the narrator's voice did not help the game's presentation. Tailby positively noted the soundtrack as light-hearted and enjoyable, and Fuller described the overall score as "beautiful". Kobylanski praised the music as again fitting in with Yoko's earlier works, being a strong score in its own right despite falling short of the Nier series in his eyes, and enjoyed the artwork and presentation.

Discussing the gameplay, Sheeve noted a small increase in difficulty, but otherwise felt little had changed from the previous game, additional criticising a high encounter rate and slow battle animations. Jeuxvideo.com noted a lack of innovations and menu design problems, but praised the option to accelerate battles and felt the battle system remained sound. Vogel noted a lack of improvements or innovation, but still enjoyed the battle system. Rudek praised the combat system and its additional elements. Tailby negatively mentioned its slow pace in navigation and combat, though noted gameplay improvements related to its battle system. Fuller enjoyed the gameplay's pace, but felt the encounter rate was uncomfortably high. Kobylanski negatively noted a lack of innovation or enjoyable twists beyond the aesthetic, which had already been done identically in The Isle Dragon Roars.
