= Voice of Cards: The Beasts of Burden =

- Developer: Alim
- Publisher: Square Enix
- Directors: Maasa Mimura; Yoko Taro
- Artist: Kimihiko Fujisaka
- Writers: Yoshiho Akabane; Agata Rokuro; Yoko Taro
- Composers: Oliver Good; Shotaro Seo; Keiichi Okabe
- Series: Voice of Cards
- Platforms: Nintendo Switch; PlayStation 4; Windows; Android; iOS
- Release: PlayStation 4, Nintendo Switch, Windows; September 13, 2022; Android, iOS; March 23, 2023
- Genre: Role-playing
- Modes: Single-player, multiplayer

Voice of Cards: The Beasts of Burden (Note: Japanese: Voice of Cards 囚われの魔物, Hepburn: Boisu ofu Kādo: Toraware no Mamono) is a 2022 role-playing video game developed by Alim and published by Square Enix for PlayStation 4, Nintendo Switch and Windows. It was released for Android and iOS in 2023. It is the third game in the Voice of Cards series, which uses the aesthetic of a tabletop role-playing game for its story and gameplay. The player controls a woman out for revenge against the monsters that destroyed her home. Gameplay involves travelling between towns, completing story quests and fighting in turn-based battles, with the party able to use captured monsters as powerful abilities.

Several staff members from earlier Voice of Cards titles returned including creative director Yoko Taro, executive producer Yosuke Saito, lead director Maasa Mimura, artist Kimihiko Fujisaka, and composers Oliver Good and Shotaro Seo. Yoko also contributed to the scenario due to time pressure. Apart from gameplay features, the overall atmosphere also took a dark turn in its narrative and visuals.

== Gameplay ==
A battle in Voice of Cards: The Beasts of Burden; protagonist Al'e uses captured monsters in an attack.

Voice of Cards: The Beasts of Burden is a role-playing video game which presents its world, characters and battles in the style of a tabletop role-playing game; everything is represented using cards, with the player navigating environments as a game piece, with environments being obscured until the player approaches and adjascent cards are flipped over. The player explores both a segmented overworld environment, and self-contained dungeon and town areas through a linear story campaign. In towns, players can rest at a local inn, and buy and sell items and equipment from merchants. Players can also engage in a card-based minigame, with the aim being to match card types and scores while working with or around random card effects, with the winner having the highest score. The card minigame supports four-person local multiplayer.

Battles play out through both scripted and random encounters with a party of four controlled by the player. During combat, the player can perform standard attacks, use items, and perform skills using gems generated once per turn and added to a pool. Some skill effects are dictated by rolling a dice. During some battles, happenstance cards are triggered, granting an effect to both the player and the enemy party. Damage from attacks is calculated using the attack and defense values on each card, while each character can only have one positive and one negative status effect at a time. Upon winning, the party is awarded with gold and experience points, with leveling up raising a character's health and attributes. After a certain point in the story, the player can also capture some defeated monsters and convert them into ability cards, which include powerful attacks and healing the party. Gaining a higher rank version of an existing card will cause the old card to be discarded, and all cards are single-use.

== Synopsis ==
The Beasts of Burden is set in a world without stars where humans live underground and have waged hate-filled war against monsters for a millennium. When Al'e's underground village destroyed by a large monster, she is rescued by L'gol, an emotionally-distant young man serving the council of the surface city of Steelborough. Rescued due to a legendary ability of underground dwellers to control monsters, Al'e is sent to capture a powerful entity dubbed the Steel Primal, which has gone on a rampage and stirred violence in the local monsters. When Steelborough's elders attempt to take the Primal, as they sought its power to declare war on a neighbouring power and caused its rampage, L'gol betrays and kills the council to avenge their abuse of him and flees with Al'e into the surrounding desert lands. They are joined by Pulche, a scholar studying monsters after his parents apparently died in a monster attack; and Tralis, a half-monster beast tamer who Al'e initially mistrusts due to her hatred of monsters.

At Pulche's request, Al'e aids him in studying the cause behind monsters. Finding a settlement using the Fire Primal's energy despite it slowly killing them, Al'e captures the Fire Primal and decides to seek the legendary Newterra, a land abundant in resources that could help the people of the lands. During their journey they discover further cases of the enmity between humans and monsters causing tragedy. Scaling the ice wall enclosing Newterra, capturing the Ice Primal in the process, Al'e's party finds Newterra is inhabited by monsters, including the one that destroyed Al'e's village. While they destroy the large monster's village, they discover monsters are as sentient as humans and harbor equal hatred. The group find the path to a large modern underground city under the monster village, a remnant of the "old world". There, fighting monsters wearing modern clothes, they discover Pulche's mother Mizar is still alive, losing the captured Primals to her.

Confronted, Mizar reveals that monsters were originally humans who willingly and permanently mutated themselves to fend off biological weapons that ran amok in the wake of a war; humans rejected them, spawning the millennium of conflict and the fall of the old world. Mizar and her husband were captured by the monsters to study the mutagen, and Mizar killed her husband when he attempted to abandon the project. She now intends to use the mutagen to change all humans into monsters, and used the young L'gol as a test subject. The party defeat the Primals, fatally wounding Mizar in the process, then are cornered by the pursuing forces of Steelborough. L'gol, transforming into a monster, saves the others and defeats the Steelborough forces. Reuniting with the transformed L'gol, Al'e sets off with Pulche and Tralis to bring night back to the world and see the stars. The narration claims that while the hatred between humans and monsters remains, Al'e's story offers hope for an eventual peace.

== Development ==
The Beasts of Burden, as with the first two Voice of Cards titles, was developed by Alim and published by Square Enix. Returning staff included creative director Yoko Taro, executive producer Yosuke Saito, lead director Maasa Mimura, and artist Kimihiko Fujisaka. The scenario was co-written by Yoshiho Akabane, Agata Rokuro, and Yoko. Voice of Cards was envisioned as a trilogy sharing a card-based tabletop aesthetic for gameplay and story. With the third game, more features were included such as the monster capturing, the story's tone was darker, and a female lead was introduced as opposed to the male leads of previous titles.

The story's theme was described as showing the other side of the conflict between humans and monsters, with the moral positions of the different sides being reversed at some points. Yoko, who had previously had minimal input in the series' scenarios, contributed to the writing due to unspecified development problems. Fujisaka's character designs and artwork drew inspiration from Yoko's Nier games, adopting a darker color pallette compared to earlier titles. The gamemaster, acting as the narrator for the story, was voiced by Carin Gilfry in English and Yui Ishikawa in Japanese. Yoko had grown tired of male voices, and Mimura decided on the change as part of the general tonal shift. Ishikawa, who had worked with Yoko as the voice of 2B in Nier: Automata, was interested in the Voice of Cards series before being offered the role. She found the role challenging, as she had to take the unfamiliar role of narrator, and keep going through small mistakes so it sounded natural.

The Beasts of Burden was announced on September 1, 2022, set for digital release on September 13 for Nintendo Switch, PlayStation 4 and Windows. As part of the Deluxe Digital Edition and also sold separately was themed downloadable content, including character redesigns and music from the mobile game Nier Reincarnation. Additional themed cards and items were available exclusively as a pre-order bonus. In commemoration of the third game's release, merchandise themed around the series was released through Square Enix's store. It was ported to Android and iOS on March 23, 2023. A bundle of all three Voice of Cards titles was released on its original platforms on the same day.

=== Music ===
As with the other Voice of Card titles, the music was handled by Monaca, a group headed by long-time collaborator Keiichi Okabe. While previously a composer, Okabe shifted to the role of music director, with the music being handled by returning composers Oliver Good and Shotaro Seo. The soundtrack was describe as both a "culmination" of the series music, and a blend of the best-liked elements from the previous two games' soundtracks. Good and Seo collaborated on the score, carrying over the Latin American elements from The Forsaken Maiden while adding Northern European ethnic instruments. The music's tone was more "morose" for The Beasts of Burden, though lighter music was present for comedic scenes within the story. Each composer created seven tracks each. The female vocals were provided by Yukino Orita and Saki Nakae, while Seo contributed male vocals. A soundtrack album was released digitally alongside the game on September 13.

== Reception ==
Reception

Aggregate score
Aggregator	Score
Metacritic	(NS) 76/100 (PS4) 77/100

Review scores
Publication	Score
Hardcore Gamer	4/5
Nintendo Life	9/10
RPGamer	3/5
RPGFan	82%
RPG Site	6/10
