= Keiichi Okabe =

Japanese composer and arranger (born 1969)

- 岡部 啓一
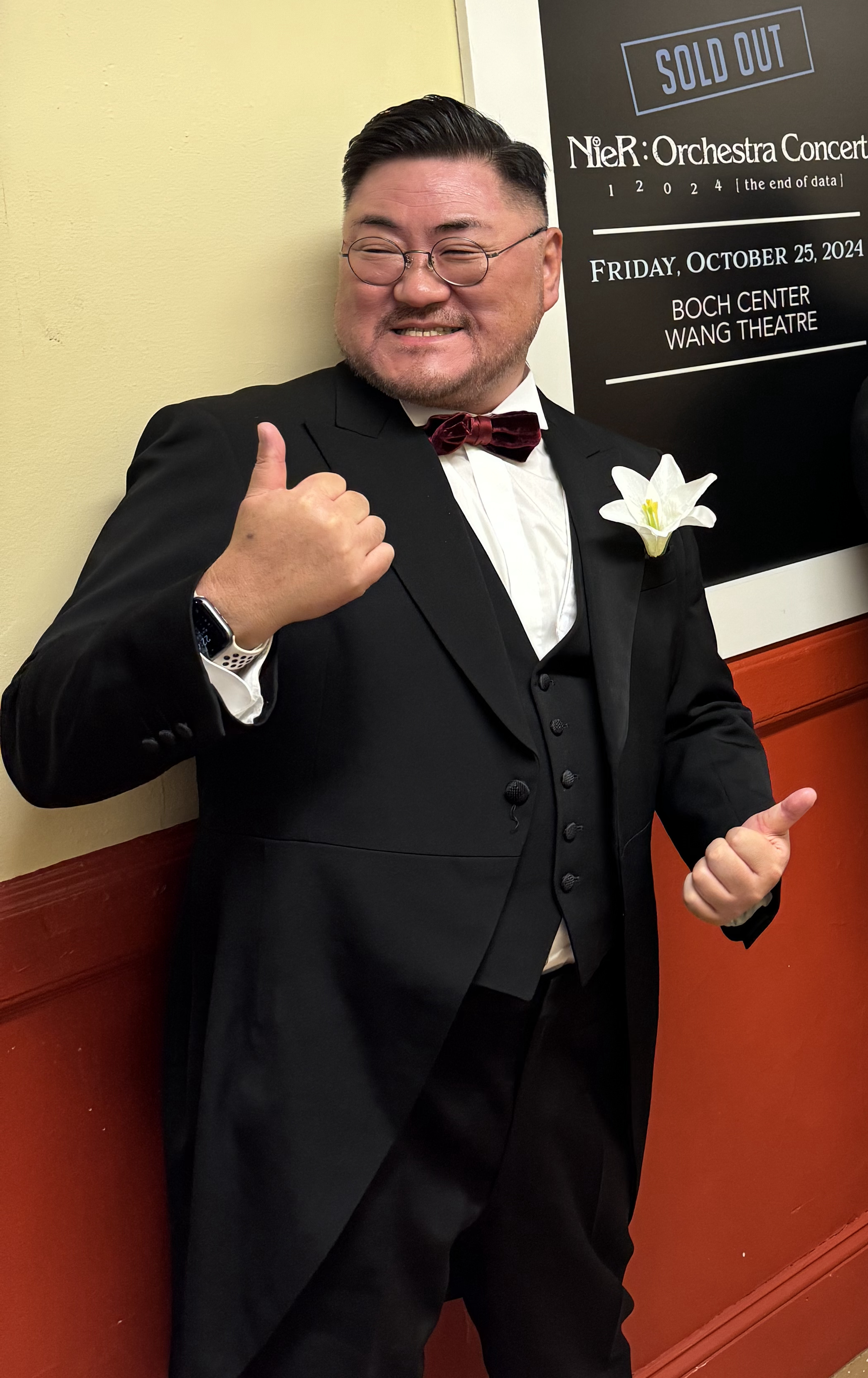
- Okabe in October 2024
- Born: May 26, 1969 (age 57); Kobe, Hyōgo, Japan
- Other name: BKO
- Education: Kobe Design University
- Occupations: Composer; arranger; musician; singer
- Years active: 1994–present
- Employer: Namco (1994–2001)
- Organization: Monaca
- Musical career
- Genres: Video game music; ambient; orchestral; new age; big beat; synthpop; funk; rock; J-pop

Keiichi Okabe (岡部 啓一, Okabe Keiichi; born May 26, 1969) is a Japanese composer and arranger, best known for composing music for the Tekken and Drakengard series. He started his career at Namco in 1994, where he primarily composed for arcade games. Outside of video games, he has composed for anime series such as Working!! and Yuki Yuna is a Hero, along with arranging tracks for J-pop artists. He established the music production studio Monaca in 2004, which composes for various types of media.

== Early life ==
Okabe started taking electric organ lessons as a child, covering contemporary pop and film music. Although he did not learn from teachers, he would develop his musical skills through joining a band and recording music. He has cited Henry Mancini, Ennio Morricone, and Ryuichi Sakamoto as being some of his musical influences. He studied at Kobe Design University.

== Namco and early freelance work (1994–2004) ==
After graduating from university, Okabe joined Namco in 1994, with his first work being a handful of tracks for medal game Spiral Fall. He would also work on titles such as Air Combat 22, along with some arrangements for the PS1 version of Tekken 2. This would lead to him scoring Tekken 3 along with fellow Namco composer Nobuyoshi Sano. Both composers chose to make big beat music for the game as it both fitted the atmosphere of the game and had not been done in video games before. During the game's production, he became ill. He and Sano would also work on Tekken Tag Tournament with other composers in 1999.

In the later years of his employment at Namco, Okabe did a handful of freelance composing and remixing gigs, such as composing background music for commercials and other video productions, as well as remixing pop songs with Junichi Soma. He left Namco in 2001 to become a fully independent freelancer; while he feels that the game industry served as an outlet for him to create music, he wanted more freedom to work on non-game projects. In addition to further work on game projects and remixes, he also composed and arranged a number of songs for various artists, such as Ryuichi Kawamura. However, being freelance resulted in him losing a lot of social trust, such as being unable to change residence or sign up for a credit card.

== Monaca (2004–present) ==
After struggling as a freelancer, Okabe founded music production studio Monaca in 2004. Although it originally consisted of just Okabe, he would later be joined by ex-Namco composers such as Satoru Kōsaki, who also wanted to work on non-game projects. To this day, the studio frequently composes for both video games and anime, as well as other types of media such as live action films.

In 2010, he served as the lead composer for Nier, being assisted by fellow Monaca composers Kakeru Ishihama and Keigo Hoashi, along with Cavia composer and sound director Takafumi Nishimura. To fit with the game's story, he composed a soundtrack that he describes as "mysterious, delicate, and ephemeral". The team were given creative freedom, while working under Yoko Taro's direction, who attended the same university as Okabe and was a 3D graphics designer at Namco. The composers worked with English-Japanese singer Emi Evans, who wrote and sang the lyrics present in the game's songs. As Taro wanted the game's musical direction to be well represented in the game, the team participated in the project as early as the planning stages, leading to Okabe composing three songs. Various musical directions were also explored later in the game's development.

Okabe, Ishihama and Hoashi would go on to compose for its 2017 sequel Nier: Automata, while being joined by Kuniyuki Takahashi. Its music was acclaimed; it won the award for "Best Score/Music" at The Game Awards 2017, and was a runner-up for "Best Original Music" at IGN's Best of 2017 Awards.

In 2019, he composed for battle royale game Cyber Hunter with fellow Monaca composer Ryuichi Takada, both working with violinist Yu Manabe.

== Notable works ==
=== Video games ===
Year	Title	Notes	Ref.
1994	Ridge Racer	PS1 version; music with Yuri Misumi	
1995	Air Combat 22	Music with Kazuhiro Nakamura and Hiroyuki Kawada	
1996	Ace Driver: Victory Lap	Music with Hiroyuki Kawada and Yuri Misumi	
1996	Alpine Surfer	Music ("Blizzard")	
1996	Namco Classic Collection Vol. 2	Music ("Area 4 BGM - Mountains")	
1996	Tekken 2	PS1 version; arrangements with various others	
1996	Dancing Eyes	Music ("Space Alien Stage" and "Space Alien Motion")	
1997	Tekken 3	Arcade version; music with Nobuyoshi Sano	
1997	Xevious 3D/G+	PS1 version; music ("Area 2" and "Boss 2")	
1998	Tekken 3	PS1 version; music with various others	
1999	Tekken Tag Tournament	Arcade version; music with various others	
2000	Tekken Tag Tournament	PS2 version; music with various others	
2001	Taiko no Tatsujin	Music ("Love You ☆ Don Chan")	
2002	Alpine Racer 3	Music with various others	
2003	Glass Rose	Cutscene music	
2004	Xenosaga Freaks	Music with various others	
2004	Espgaluda	PlayStation 2 version; arrangements with various others	
2004	Taiko no Tatsujin: Atsumare! Matsuri da!! Yondaime	Music with various others	
2005	Tekken 5	PS2 version; cutscene music with various others	
2005	Naruto: Uzumaki Chronicles	Cutscene music	
2005	Heavy Metal Thunder	Cutscene music	
2005	Tekken 5: Dark Resurrection	Music with various others	
2006	Rappelz	Music with various others	
2006	Tekken: Dark Resurrection	Cutscene music with Satoru Kōsaki	
2007	Mizuiro Blood	Music with Yuri Misumi	
2007	Taiko no Tatsujin 10	Music ("Angel Dream")	
2007	Naruto: Uzumaki Chronicles 2	Western version; music (opening theme)	
2007	Beautiful Katamari	Music ("Boyfriend a Gogo")	
2007	Tekken 6	Arcade version; music with various others	
2008	Taiko no Tatsujin 11	Arrangement ("Kare Kano Kanon")	
2008	Taiko no Tatsujin 12	Music ("Fantasy of the Wind")	
2009	Taiko no Tatsujin 12 Do-n! And Extra Edition	Music ("Yuga Onoki")	
2009	Katamari Forever	Cutscene music with various others	
2009	Tekken 6	Console versions; music with various others	
2010	Nier	Music with Kakeru Ishihama, Keigo Hoashi, and Takafumi Nishimura	
2011	Ridge Racer 3D	Music ("Rolling Glider")	
2011	Taiko no Tatsujin: Portable DX	Music ("Pastel Dream")	
2011	Tekken Tag Tournament 2	Arcade version; music with various others	
2011	Lord of Apocalypse	Music with Keigo Hoashi	
2012	Taiko no Tatsujin: Katsu-Don	Music ("Chiri Yuku Ran no Tsudzuru Uta")	
2012	Demons' Score	Music ("The Overture of Battle")	
2012	Tekken Tag Tournament 2	Console versions; music with various others	
2013	Drakengard 3	Music with various others	
2014	Super Smash Bros. for Nintendo 3DS and Wii U	Arrangements (Note: "Dark World / Dark World Dungeon", "Ashley's Song (JP) Ver. 2")	
2015	Tekken 7	Arcade version; music ("Arctic Snowfall")	
2015	maimai	Music ("Ribabu")	
2017	Nier: Automata	Music with Keigo Hoashi and Kuniyuki Takahashi	
2017	Final Fantasy XV: Episode Gladiolus	Music (main theme)	
2017	SINoALICE	Music with Keigo Hoashi and Shotaro Seo	
2017	Terra Battle: Mechatura Monogatari	Music with various others	
2018	Fate/Extella Link	Music with Ryuichi Takada, Keigo Hoashi, and Shotaro Seo	
2018	Super Smash Bros. Ultimate	Arrangements (Note: "Ground Theme – Super Mario Bros. 2", "Flash Man Stage", and "Aerith's Theme")	
2018	Soulcalibur VI	Music ("City Ruins – Soul")	
2019	The Idolmaster Cinderella Girls: Starlight Stage	Music ("Tani no Soko de Saku Hana wa")	
2019	Cyber Hunter	Music with Ryuichi Takada	
2019	The Seven Deadly Sins: Battle of Light and Darkness	Music	
2019	Final Fantasy XIV: Shadowbringers	Music (YoRHa: Dark Apocalypse contents)	
2021	Nier Reincarnation	Music with Shotaro Seo and Kuniyuki Takahashi	
2021	NieR Replicant ver.1.22474487139...	Arrangements with various others	
2021	Voice of Cards: The Isle Dragon Roars	Music with Oliver Good and Shotaro Seo	
2022	Voice of Cards: The Forsaken Maiden	Music with Oliver Good and Shotaro Seo	
2022	Soul Hackers 2	Music with various others	
2022	Voice of Cards: The Beasts of Burden	Music with Oliver Good and Shotaro Seo	
2025	Hyrule Warriors: Age of Imprisonment	Music with Monaca	
2026	Gakuen Idolmaster	Music ("Sekirara")	
2026	Marvel Tōkon: Fighting Souls	Music with various others	

=== Anime ===
Year	Title	Notes	Ref.
2002	Whistle!	Opening theme "Double Wind" (with Junichi Soma)	
2006	The Melancholy of Haruhi Suzumiya	Arrangement ("Yuuutsu no Yuuutsu")	
2008	Sekirei	Music ("Kimi wo Omou Toki")	
2009	Sora o Miageru Shōjo no Hitomi ni Utsuru Sekai	Music with Monaca	
2009	Tenjōbito to Akutobito Saigo no Tatakai	Music with Monaca	
2010	Working!!	Music with Kakeru Ishihama, Keigo Hoashi, and Satoru Kōsaki	
2010	Sekirei: Pure Engagement	Music with Hiroaki Sano and Satoru Kōsaki	
2010	Highschool of the Dead	Ending theme ("Memories of days gone by")	
2010	Star Driver	Music with Monaca	
2011	Wandering Son	Music with Satoru Kōsaki and Keigo Hoashi	
2011	Working'!!	Insert song ("Itsumo no you ni LOVE&PEACE!!")	
2012	Nyaruko: Crawling with Love	Insert song ("Striver of Black Steel")	
2012	Aikatsu!	Music with Monaca	
2013	My Teen Romantic Comedy SNAFU		
2013	Servant × Service	Insert song ("Hachimitsu Jikan")	
2013	Aikatsu! (2nd season)	Music with Monaca	
2014	Nisekoi	Music with various others	
2014	Wake Up, Girls!	Insert song ("Kotonoha Aoba")	
2014	Nanana's Buried Treasure	Music with various others	
2014	Captain Earth	Music with various others	
2014	Dai-Shogun – Great Revolution	Opening theme ("Tamashii Rises")	
2014	Yuki Yuna is a Hero	Music with Keigo Hoashi, Kuniyuki Takahashi, and Kakeru Ishihama	
2014	Garo: The Carved Seal of Flames	Music with Ryuichi Takada and Kuniyuki Takahashi	
2014	Aikatsu! (3rd season)	Music with Monaca	
2015	Ultimate Otaku Teacher	Insert song ("Meido no Hinkaku)	
2015	Working!!!	Music with Monaca	
2015	Garo: Crimson Moon	Music with Ryuichi Takada and Kuniyuki Takahashi	
2015	Concrete Revolutio	Music with various others	
2016	Anne Happy	Music with various others	
2016	Aikatsu Stars!	Insert song ("Heart ga Ski♡p")	
2016	Garo: Divine Flame	Music ("The Heavenly Sword That Severs Karma - Summoning Heavenly Sword Glitter Garo")	
2017	Wake Up, Girls! Shin Shou	Insert song ("Shizuku no Kanmuri")	
2017	Anime-Gatari	Music with Keigo Hoashi, Kuniyuki Takahashi, and Takahiro Furukawa	
2017	Yuki Yuna is a Hero: Washio Sumi Chapter	Music with Keigo Hoashi, Kuniyuki Takahashi, and Shotaro Seo	
2019	Assassins Pride	Music with Keigo Hoashi, Kuniyuki Takahashi, and Hidekazu Tanaka	
2021	Yuki Yuna is a Hero: The Great Mankai Chapter	Music with Keigo Hoashi and Kuniyuki Takahashi	
2022	Summer Time Rendering	Music with Ryuichi Takada and Keigo Hoashi	
2023	Nier: Automata Ver1.1a	Music with Keigo Hoashi and Kuniyuki Takahashi	
2027	Maiden Blood	Music with Kuniyuki Takahashi and Taichi Jōraku	

=== Other ===
Year	Title	Notes	Ref.
2005	Happiness / Maki Ohguro	Arrangement ("Kouishou")	
2014	Kakumeiteki Broadway Shugisha Doumei / Sumire Uesaka	Music ("Aishū Fake Honeymoon")	
2018	Braverthday / Nobuhiko Okamoto	Music ("Tobu Tame ni")	
2020	Garden / Saori Hayami	Arrangement ("Glimmer") with Saori Hayami	
2022	Chimudondon	Music with Ryuichi Takada and Keigo Hoashi	
