= Protagonist of Nier =

Fictional character of the Drakengard series

- Drakengard character
- Official artwork featuring the two versions of the Nier protagonist
- First game: Nier (2010)
- Created by: Yoko Taro
- Designed by: D.K; Akihiko Yoshida, Kimihiko Fujisaka (2021)
- Voiced by: English: Jamieson Price (father); Zach Aguilar (ver.1.22, young brother); Ray Chase (ver.1.22, older brother); Japanese: Kenichirou Matsuda (ver.1.22, father); Nobuhiko Okamoto (young brother); Koji Yusa (older brother)

The player-named protagonist (Note: Japanese: 主人公, Hepburn: shujinkō) is a character from the 2010 video game Nier, a spin-off of the Drakengard series developed by Cavia and published by Square Enix. Although the character has no specific name in gaming, he is called Nier (ニーア, Nīa) in related media and merchandise. During Nier, the protagonist goes on a quest to help Yonah, a young girl who falls ill with the terminal Black Scrawl illness, and then to rescue her from a being called the Shadowlord in a post-apocalyptic world beset by creatures called Shades. Due to publisher feedback, two versions of the protagonist exist: a brother looking after his sister, originally exclusive to Japan, and a father caring for his daughter, designed for the West.

The protagonist was created by Yoko Taro, director and story writer of Nier. Korean illustrator D.K created the protagonist's designs, and writer Sawako Natori contributed to his backstory and portrayal. Despite the protagonist's regional differences, the narrative remained mostly the same between versions. For the 2021 remaster, his designs were redone by Akihiko Yoshida (brother) and Kimihiko Fujisaka (father), respectively. The younger protagonist is voiced by Nobuhiko Okamoto and Koji Yusa in Japanese, and the adult character in English by Jamieson Price. For the remaster, Kenichirou Matsuda provided a Japanese dub for the adult version, while the brother protagonist's English actors were Zach Aguilar and Ray Chase.

Though critical response to the elder protagonist was generally positive for his caring personality that contrasts with his barbarian appearance and relationship with his daughter, the decision to alter the design was the subject of discussion by several writers due to the perceived need to appeal to Western audiences. The younger protagonist was praised for his energetic persona and was seen as a better character once a time-skip in the game was reflected in a major change in his look.

== Appearances ==
=== Nier ===
The player-named protagonist is the lead and main playable character in Nier, living on a post-apocalyptic Earth in a village with the young girl Yonah; depending on the version, he is portrayed as a young man with Yonah as his sister or an older man with Yonah as his daughter. To support Yonah, the protagonist acts as a courier for their village. The protagonist is a Replicant, one of the soulless artificial humans that populate the Earth following an apocalyptic magical pandemic. Human souls exist as shadow-like beings called Gestalts, intended to rejoin with their Replicant counterparts. After the Replicants gained sentience with their own souls and saw the Gestalts as monsters, dubbing them "Shades", the two sides came into conflict. When Yonah falls sick from the Black Scrawl, a condition triggered by an issue in the Replicant system, the protagonist goes on a quest to find a cure for her.

The protagonist is joined by Grimoire Weiss, a talking book with access to magic; Kainé, a foul-mouthed swordswoman part-possessed by the Gestalt Tyrann; and Emil, a boy who self-isolates due to his petrification powers. He finds fragments of Grimoire Weiss's powers, but the Shadowlord, a powerful Gestalt key to the Replicant system, kidnaps Yonah after attacking the protagonist's village with a powerful Shade; Kainé forces Emil to petrify her to seal the Shade away. The Shadowlord is later revealed to be the protagonist's Gestalt, who sought out Yonah's Replicant form to save his Gestalt sister/daughter, mirroring the protagonist's actions.

Five years later, the protagonist helps Emil find new powers that free Kainé and goes on another quest to find parts of a key that unlock the Shadowlord's castle, where Yonah is being held. After retrieving the key fragments, all held by powerful Shades, the protagonist enters the Shadowlord's castle and is forced to fight Devola and Popola, two androids who ran his village and oversee the Replicant system. In the game's first two endings, the protagonist kills the Shadowlord and rescues Yonah; in the sister timeline, the Shadowlord's death will eventually lead to the extinction of both Replicants and Gestalts. The final two endings are based around a choice after Kainé is overwhelmed by Tyrann following the Shadowlord's death; the protagonist can either kill her to end her suffering or sacrifice his and Tyrann's existence to restore her normal form, leaving her and Yonah with no memories of him.

=== Related media and crossovers ===
Both versions of the protagonist featured in post-launch downloadable content dubbed "The World of Recycled Vessel": the DLC featured the alternate version of the character from that game's version. Further details around the protagonist are included in Grimoire Nier, a guidebook featuring plot and character summaries, short stories, concept art, and developer commentary. The short story Red and Black details the brother protagonist's early struggles caring for Yonah, including prostituting himself to another man before killing him on a Shade hunt and becoming his village's courier with Devola and Popola's encouragement. Kainé's quest to restore the protagonist to reality is core to the Grimoire Nier short story The Lost World, and the new ending section of the 2021 expanded remaster Nier Replicant ver.1.22474487139... is based on this story. The protagonist is featured in the 2011 CD drama NieR Replicant Drama CD: The Lost Words and the Red Sky, which included both the in-game story and a non-canon version in a high school setting.

The protagonist was featured as a downloadable content crossover costume for Nier: Automata (2017) and PUBG: Battlegrounds (2017). The protagonist cameoed in a flashback sequence in the 2023 anime Nier: Automata Ver1.1a, an inclusion attributed to the anime's staff. He is featured as a character in a special event in the mobile game Nier Reincarnation (2021) under the name "The Man Who Destroyed the World" (世界を滅ぼした男, Sekai o Horoboshita Otoko). The protagonist is also featured in a collaboration with the mobile game SINoALICE, alongside fellow Nier character Emil. Promotional merchandise themed after the protagonist have been produced, including a plushie and a Nendoroid figurine.

== Concept and development ==
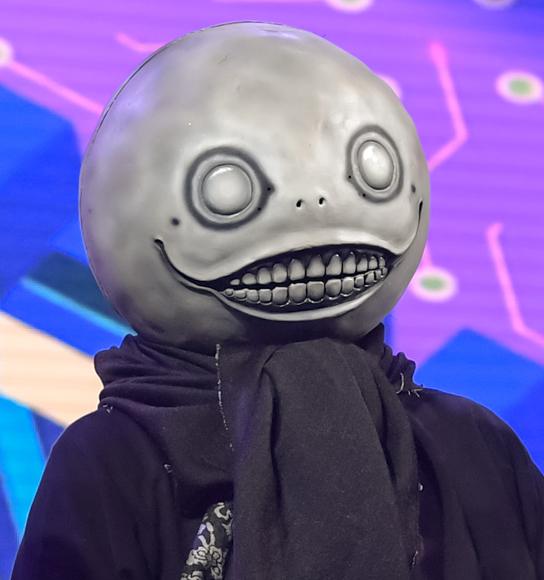
Yoko Taro, director and story writer for Nier

The protagonist was created by Yoko Taro, director and story writer of Nier (2010). His original plan featured a young brother protecting his sister as the only version. During production, producer Yosuke Saito received feedback from the North American and European branches of publisher Square Enix, stating that adult protagonists were preferred over the original idea. There was further pushback from Western staff over the design of a young and slim figure wielding a large weapon. There was some pressure to drop the younger protagonist altogether due to budgetary reasons, but Yoko pushed for his inclusion, and as a compromise, two versions of the game were created. In Japan, the Replicant version for PlayStation 3 featured the brother, while the Gestalt version for Xbox 360 used the father. In the West, both versions used the father, something Yoko did not want but conceded to. Talking about this discrepancy in terms of in-game dates and canonicity, Yoko described the two versions as alternate, repeating, equally valid events. Yoko never gave the protagonist a name, though fans used the name "Nier", the game's title. When writing later story material, Yoko used the name "Nier" out of necessity. The character's skills were inspired by the hack and slash games God of War which the director and produced were fans of despite acknowledging Japanese audiences were not fond of it in general. However, unlike the protagonist Kratos, the Nier lead develops his style of magic when teaming up with Weiss.

While the basic storyline remained the same, elements of character dialogue had to be adjusted to fit with either a brother or a father. Yoko and scenario writers Sawako Natori and Hana Kikuchi all agreed on the backstory element of the protagonist sleeping with women and men for money, though this could not be included in-game. Upon seeing this detail, Nier short story writer Jun Eishima was shocked and needed to tone down the more direct description used by Yoko. A scene Natori wrote for the game, where Yonah saw the protagonist's resentment of her burden on him, was cut by Yoko for being "too real". The final scene of the first ending, where Yonah interrupts the protagonist's farewell to Kainé, was written by Natori as a "twisted" conclusion. The main theme of the story was "family love" regardless of the protagonist's nature when interacting with Yonah. The final scene involves the protagonist enjoying his happy life with Yonah as requested by Saito, a decision Yoko accepted despite it clashing with his previous work. Yoko also commented that the overall sad ending, with everyone doomed to die regardless, was his reflection of the real world, where death is inevitable regardless of any individual's actions.

The relationship between the protagonist and Kainé was not the focus of the game, so the story remained simple, with Yoko's original plan being a simple plot of a brother saving his sister. Yoko envisioned the party dynamic as familial without any romantic elements to the protagonist's relationship with Kainé, though in the guidebook interview, Yoko confirmed Kainé developed romantic feelings for the protagonist by the ending. The protagonist's choice whether to kill or save Kainé during the game's final endings was intended to be based on how much players had come to like her. Eishima felt that each ending was better suited to different versions of the protagonist; the father would choose to kill Kainé, while the brother would sacrifice himself. The ending scenario where the protagonist is restored, included in Grimoire Nier, was initially an alternate proposal if the sacrificial ending, which involved players' save data being deleted, was not approved. The Grimoire Nier scenario was included in the remaster due to the game's larger budget and a request from producer Yosuke Saito for more fan service. Yoko stated his wish that the protagonist relive his journeys with Kainé and Emil before the end, with the writers speculating that both the father and brother could experience this ending.

=== Design ===
Both versions of the protagonist were designed by Korean illustrator D.K. His younger version was designed to appear like a stereotypical kind lead character, with an early design making him look aristocratic before he was revised to appear more like an adventurer. D.K described his design for the brother as being inspired by a Siberian husky. An early version of the father's version had a "fashionable" look with a tight shirt and necktie. The design team was able to use the same basic character model for both versions of the game, though this resulted in some odd proportions between the two, as there were only limited adjustments possible. They also needed to adjust the lighting and camera position to show each character off in the best way.

For the remaster, which was set for a worldwide release, Yoko chose to focus on the brother protagonist, citing Cloud Strife from Final Fantasy VII as an example of a young character being popular. This was due to both the brother being the initially planned protagonist and the father's version seeing mixed reactions overseas. The father protagonist was featured as the player character in the original DLC content, which was incorporated into the game. The characters were redrawn by new artists for the remaster. The artists chosen had previously contributed to the Drakengard and Nier series and were brought in at Yoko's request. The brother protagonist was redone by Akihiko Yoshida, lead character artist for Nier: Automata, while the father protagonist was handled by Drakengard artist Kimihiko Fujisaka.

=== Portrayal ===
For the original Nier, the English voice recording was done first with Yoko supervising along with the localization company 8-4. The adult protagonist is voiced by Jamieson Price. In Japan, the Gestalt release used the English dub. Price, who dubbed the role in 2009, enjoyed voicing the character. He drew inspiration for the role from his own relationship with his daughter. In Japan, the protagonist has two voice actors in the Replicant version; his younger version is voiced by Nobuhiko Okamoto, while his older version is voiced by Koji Yusa. Yusa found playing the father interesting due to his subdued behavior and attitude compared to Okamoto's performance, which had a brighter and more hopeful tone.

Okamoto and Yusa returned for the 2021 remaster, and at Yoko's insistence, two voice actors were also used for the English release to create dissonance in players with the in-game timeskip. In English, the protagonist is voiced by Zach Aguilar for the younger version and Ray Chase for the older version. Aguilar felt honored to be joining the cast, as he had looked up to the other pre-established actors in his youth, while Chase enjoyed playing the older version due to both his serious side and displays of "sardonic" humor. Aguilar and Chase were told not to model their performances on each other, reinforcing the differences in character. Due to the COVID-19 pandemic, voice recording was done remotely. The father protagonist was voiced in Japanese by Kenichirou Matsuda in the remaster.

== Reception ==
=== Critical response ===
Upon the release of the first Nier game, GameSpot found the protagonist bland. On the other hand, RPGamer said he was surprisingly likable as a result of his relationship with his daughter and companions despite his design making him come across as a barbarian. RPGFan agreed, saying the game "made me feel like a father" due to how the main character is obsessed with taking care of Yonah but felt some of his tactics will make players question him. In a bigger article, the same site noted that he is one of the best fathers in gaming history due to his soft side, which contrasts his dark appearance. Destructoid found the relationship between the father and the daughter "touching" and that his other bonds also help improve the narrative. Several writers said that the elder protagonist was one of the earliest examples of appealing fathers in gaming, noting it appears to have led to similar characters like Kratos from God of War. In a retrospective in 2023, Hobby Consolas said that while Nier's characterization and role might be common within role-playing games, the major plot twists the game presents surprised the audience, elevating a weak beginning.

The release of the Nier Replicant remaster in Western regions led to multiple responses to the younger main character with Kotaku finding him too stereotypical. In another article, Kotaku felt that the plot of the game did not carry the same strength as the original due to the handling of the hero. He compared the two leads, praising the brother for his energetic youth in contrast to the father, whom he found tired whenever he was not dealing with his daughter. He also liked that the time-skip changes the brother to the point his voice actor changes. RPGFan and Electronic Gaming Monthly also said that the brother makes a better relationship with Yonah than the original father due to how his characterization noticeably changes in the time-skip. Aguilar and Chase's performances were also praised by Anime News Network; they "split the billing as Nier at different points in his life, and they capture the character's many nuanced shades of anger, resilience, compassion, and undying loyalty".

=== Characterization and themes ===
In Believing in Bits, the protagonist is described as tricky due to how both he and the player discover across the narrative the true nature of the civilians the player encounters and the close relationship Yoko Taro gave Nier to the final antagonist, who instead comes across as more sympathetic as a result. This is more notable in replays, where the player can understand the dialogue of the enemies in his battles. The protagonist's acts of violence were compared to those of Yoko Taro's previous protagonists such as Caim and Zero from the Drakengard series, even if the player at first is unaware that the shades are people. Aitor Fernández de Marticorena from the University of the Balearic Islands said Caim feels similar to the Nier in latter parts of the game. GameRant noted that the brother protagonist from Nier appears to be similar to Caim, showing more examples of Yoko Taro's previous works, as he can enjoy killing similar to Caim, with both also developing similar weaponry.

The remastered version of Nier was noted for expanding the handling of the protagonist comforting Emil and Kaine. The way the trio's narrative handled was compared to the Kingdom Hearts, especially Kingdom Hearts 358/2 Days, but in a more adult fashion. The proagonist's are poorly treated over their LGBTQ status but the lead is still kind towards them. Both Emil and Kainé have romantic feelings for the protagonist, which are never returned despite their close relationship. Though the protagonist's sacrifice is undone in the final route, RPGFan found that Kainé's quest to restore his memories and body fulfilled a happier ending for the two characters. Kainé's quest to restore the protagonist helps the player connect more with the characters even if there is nothing more to accomplish in the narrative, further expanding the protagonist's bond with the two supporting characters. Fernández de Marticorena noted that the trio of the lead, Kainé, and Emil represented the people rejected by society, with the first's wounds serving as a mark of what defines his exile, though he also noted that Emil is the one who stands out the most.

When comparing the localization Nier had between the Western and Eastern releases, Ramon Mendez Gonzalez from Universidade de Vigo wondered if there was really such a need to heavily alter the original protagonist for the former release. He felt it was common for Western players to have characters similar to their fathers as protagonists in action games, comparing them to each other and finding the result chaotic. In general, Z. Zhou from the University of British Columbia saw the protagonist going through a deconstruction of the typical hero's journey found in Japanese video games with a fantasy setting. When comparing the two versions of the protagonist, Zhou claimed that the father attracted several fans to the point of calling it "daddening". Meanwhile, the brother incarnation was compared to 9S from Nier: Automata based on their looks. The young protagonist was noted to appeal more to the Eastern audience, according to Ramón Méndez González from Universidad de Alicante Palabras. While exploring more the archetypes, in the book Transnational Contexts of Culture, Gender, Class, and Colonialism in Play, the handling of the two Nier leads was compared to the way Westerners view role-playing game heroes such as Cloud Strife from Final Fantasy VII alongside his nemesis, Sephiroth, as overly feminine and Japanese due to the handling of masculinity depending on regions. This is reinforced by how Westerners tend to portray Final Fantasy VII characters in Machinima parodies of the game in a negative fashion. The father avatar is seen as an unfitting Japanese protagonist, while the brother is instead seen as more fitting for Japanese audiences due to how his design is more fitting with the Final Fantasy fans.
