= Zero (Drakengard) =

Fictional character of the Drakengard series

- Drakengard character
- Official artwork by Kimihiko Fujisaka
- First appearance: Drakengard 3 (2013)
- Created by: Yoko Taro
- Designed by: Kimihiko Fujisaka
- Voiced by: EN: Tara Platt; JA: Maaya Uchida

Zero (Japanese: ゼロ) is a character of the 2013 action role-playing game Drakengard 3, the third main entry in the Drakengard series, developed by Access Games and published by Square Enix. She also appeared in the arcade game Lord of Vermilion III. Zero is an Intoner, one of six god-like beings who control magic through their singing abilities. In trying to destroy the flower that gave birth to her powers and tried to use her to destroy humanity, she sets out to kill the five other Intoners spawned from her body by the flower to carry out its mission, referred to as her sisters.

Zero was created by Yoko Taro, the game's director and co-writer, and designed by Kimihiko Fujisaka. Yoko wanted an unusual type of protagonist that had not been featured very often in games. Fujisaka crafted her to emulate the dark tones of the series, although he also added features to create a feminine vibe, such as the flower in her eye. Despite being criticized for her characterization and personality, she has also been praised for her interactions with the other characters and for standing out among video game protagonists. Fans of the Drakengard series in Japan have also received her positively.

== Creation and design ==
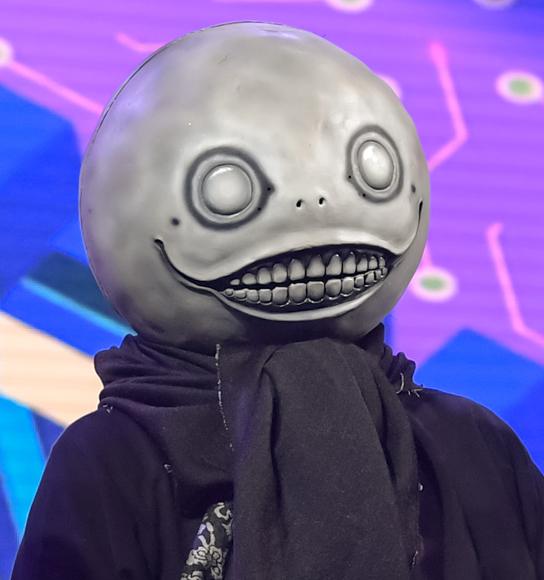
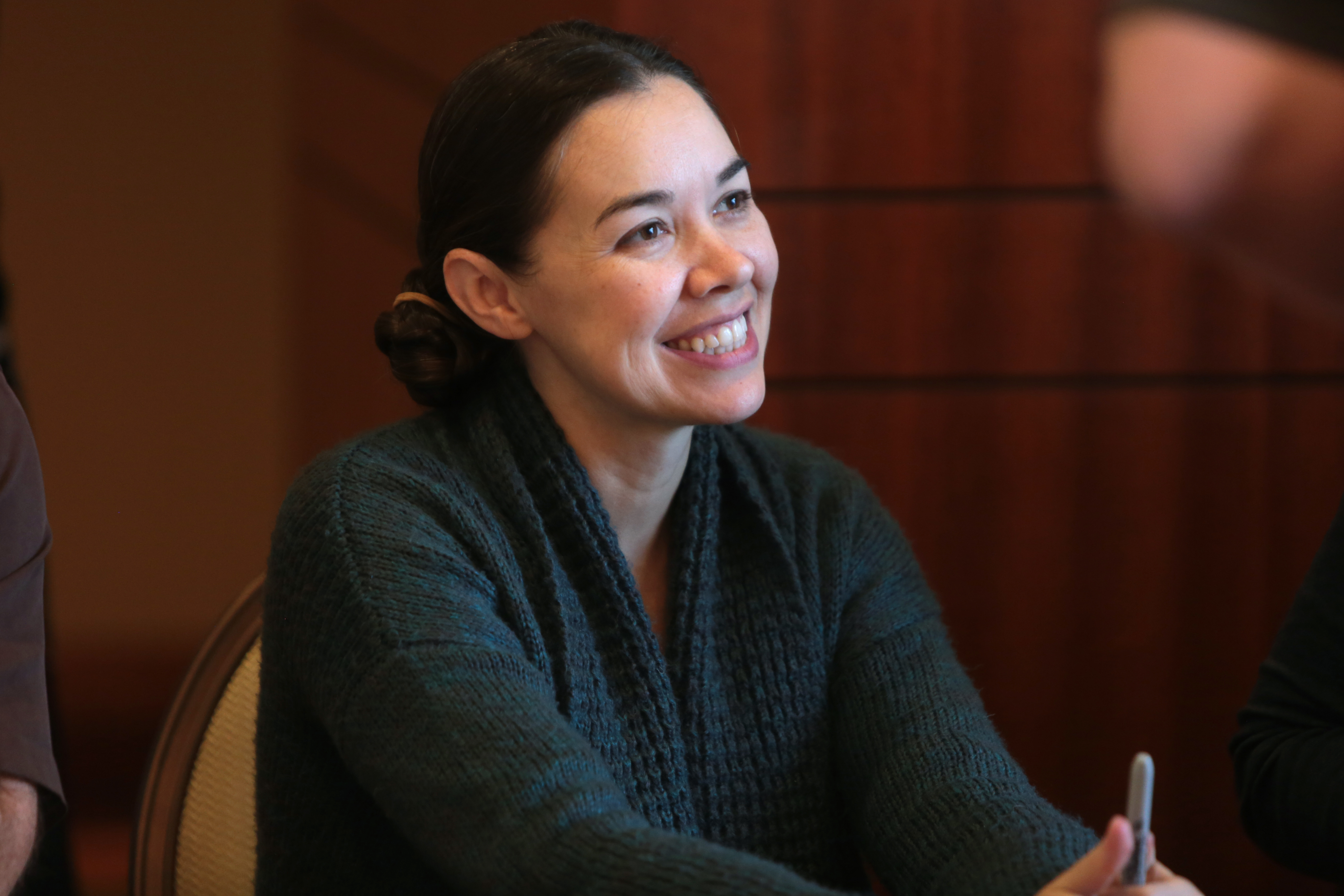
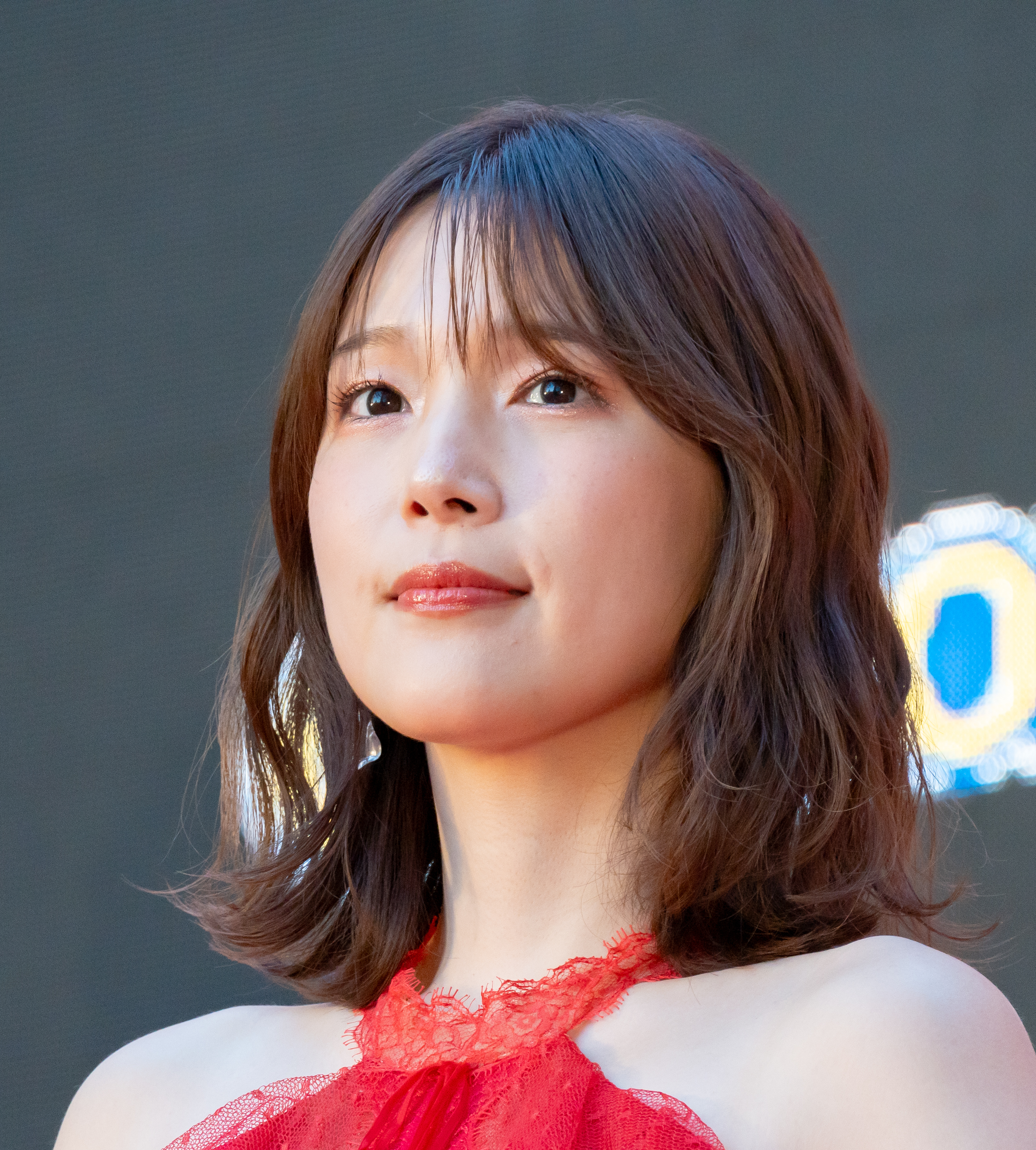
Zero was conceived by Drakengard series creator Yoko Taro (left/top). She was voiced by Tara Platt (middle) in English, and Maaya Uchida (right/bottom) in Japanese.

Zero was conceived by Yoko Taro, the director and co-writer of Drakengard 3. While conceiving her, Yoko thought it would be interesting to do a character who had worked in a brothel, as the concept had not been often explored and the Drakengard series offered an opportunity for such a protagonist to be created. This sexual aspect of the character was generally conveyed through dialogue rather than cutscenes. One of the earlier ideas for Zero's role in the game was to have her as a schoolgirl with a cellphone in a contemporary setting, but this was quickly decided against. Eventually, Yoko decided to create more female characters for Zero to interact with: one of the reasons behind this was that all other possible choices for the game had been rejected. Her number-based name, along with the names of all her sisters, were meant to make it easier for players to identify and distinguish them. Yoko helped write her dialogue to complement the game's unusual situations, such as rude conversations between her and the disciples during moments of carnage. Multiple aspects of Zero's character and worldview were incorporated into the game's theme song "This Silence is Mine" by composers Keiichi Okabe and Onitsuka Chihiro. The choice of Zero's voice actress was an important part of her design, as the team wanted to both have a good performance and surprise the audience: Maaya Uchida, normally known for gentler female roles in anime and video games, was chosen for the role.

Zero was designed by Kimihiko Fujisaka, a designer who had worked on each entry in the Drakengard series. His original design was meant to emulate her status as a god-like being, and have a more elaborate and heroic appearance, but as the game's atmosphere was finalized, Fujisaka redesigned her with some unaesthetic elements, taking direct influence from the game atmosphere: this was the main reason behind adding her prosthetic arm. The original creation of the arm was a pure accident on Fujisaka's part. Her color palette was intended as a reverse of Caim, the protagonist of Drakengard. Other aspects of her design evoked the color and design for the Goddess of the Seal, a key character in the earlier Drakengard games. She went through two redesigns before Yoko was satisfied. Her final design, along with the flower in her eye, emphasized her sexuality. She originally had no flower in her design, but Fujisaka wanted to add an aspect of femininity to her appearance. The decision to place it in her eye was to add originality to the character: while the game's producer Takamata Shiba originally feared it was too much of a risk in conjunction with her gender, Yoko approved of the design. After Zero was finalized, Yoko decided on more female characters, and told Fujisaka to "think Puella Magi Madoka Magica" while designing them. Elements of her design were incorporated into the other Intoners. Her design, along with the rest of the main characters, was inspired by modern clothing styles and fashion in contrast to the "medieval" inspiration of previous games.

== Fictional biography ==
In Zero's prequel novella, "A Rain to End and a Flower to Begin", it is revealed that Zero was abused by her mother and sold into prostitution. Eventually escaping, she grew to live by killing and stealing, with the killing eventually becoming an unconscious instinct. Eventually, she was weakened by a deadly disease and was caught and imprisoned, dying from her illness there. Upon dying, she was revived and turned into an Intoner (Note: Intoners: Songstresses (歌姫, Utahime) in the Japanese version) by a magical flower intent on destroying mankind. Learning the flower's plans for her, Zero tried to kill herself, but the flower kept her alive, and spawned five other Intoners as a safety measure: these Intoners were Zero's "sisters". The sisters eventually took control of the land from the native warlords. Eventually, Zero decides to kill her sisters, then herself to rid the world of the flower. (Note: Zero: The first time I saw this flower... was the day I died. Now I'm just a corpse being kept alive by the flower's magic. [...] This flower is a calamity that threatens the entire world. It's growing, feeding off me. Eventually it's going to consume me entirely, and once that happens? Once it's fully grown? It's going to destroy everything. [...] When I realized that I was infected with a flower that was going to end the world, I tried to kill myself. Well, technically I was already dead, but, yeah. Anyway, I tried to rip the damn thing out. But, in the end, I just made things worse. The flower freaked out. Started sprouting these... children. Five little girls, one after another. They burst out of me and ran off before I could blink. [...] But you wanna know the best part? After a while, my "sisters" started fighting for peace. They come from a flower that's gonna end the world, and they fight for PEACE? ..Hilarious. Anyway, I made my choice. I decided to kill my sisters, and then destroy the flower. (Branch D, Verse 7)) In the prequel manga Drag-On Dragoon 3: Utahime Five, told from the point of view of the other Intoners, it is revealed that she is directly responsible for the creation of the Disciples, used by her in an attempt to destroy the Intoners.

By the events of Drakengard 3, Zero had forged a partnership with the dragon Michael: as dragons are the only beings that can destroy Intoners, Michael would help Zero kill her sisters, then kill her to finish off the flower. (Note: One: Intoners offer only pestilence to this world. Someday, they will be the disease that brings ruin to all human life. That's why you're trying to kill us: to save the world. And once you succeed in killing your sisters... You're going to finish the job... and kill yourself. And you'll use that dragon to do it. (Branch C, Verse 5)) Their first attempt to take down all the Intoners ends in disaster, with Zero losing her arm and Michael being wounded and forced to reincarnate as the child dragon Mikhail. During their second attempt, they attack each one individually: after killing one, Zero takes on their disciple, (Note: Disciple: Apostle (使徒, Shito) in the Japanese version) a servant created to magnify the Intoners' powers, who each help in battle and act as a personal harem. Before facing One, Zero reverts her disciples to their original bird forms, releasing them from their servitude. (Note: Zero: It's unavoidable. Disciples can't remain in human form without an Intoner's power. Sooner or later, you'll disappear. So before that happens... I'm giving you your old forms back. (Branch A, Chapter 5, Verse 3)) During the battle, both One and Mikhail are killed, then Zero is killed by a male clone of One created as a fail-safe in the event of Zero's victory. (Note: One: Brother. I'm One's brother. / Zero: Brother? That's...impossible... / One: You wouldn't know. You only had your five sisters. But in the same way you "created" your sisters... Your sister One created me. I was a failsafe in case you managed to kill her. I was her final weapon. (Branch A, Chapter 5, Verse 4))

Around this central timeline, various "branches" appear, caused by "singularities", namely Zero, her sisters and the Disciples. (Note: Accord: In the flow of post-Cataclysm history, if a unique set of conditions known as "singularities" come together, splits occur in time, resulting in the multiple world divergence phenomenon. (Branch B, Verse 1)) During her progression through these branches, Zero is monitored by Accord, one of a race called Recorders charged with monitoring and recording history. (Note: Zero: What the hell are you, anyway? / Accord: We're Recorders. [...] It's our job to record world events from the ancient past to the distant future. You know the Old World you people are always going on about? Well, I was sent by folks from there. (Branch B, Chapter 2, Lost Verse 2)) In the second branch, while going to kill her sister Three, Zero witnesses the flower driving her sisters insane, with Three dying from poisons in the forest and One being murdered by an unhinged Two. In the ensuing battle, the disciples and Two are killed, then Mikhail is poisoned. Zero uses the flower to form a "pact" with Mikhail, resurrecting him. (Note: Accord: By utilizing the reprogramming function of the flower, the singularity known as Zero has created a new concept known as a pact. I do not know how this will affect the future. However, I will continue to observe events as they unfold. (Branch B, Ending B)) (Note: Pact: Contract (契約, Keiyaku) in the original Japanese) In the third branch, Mikhail is regressed by the Intoners to a childlike form incapable of properly defending Zero, and Zero's disciples are killed when Two self-destructs. When Mikhail is killed by One's dragon, Zero and One do battle and One is killed. Mentally unbalanced by the event, Zero sets off to find another dragon, but it is hinted that she fails. (Note: Accord: The Intoner Zero completed her objective. However, the dragon Mikhail has died and Zero's mental health is in a rather alarming state. I'm afraid there's little chance of finding a solution in this timeline. As such, I recommend sealing off this branch. (Branch C, Ending C))

In the fourth branch, Zero manages to kill all of her sisters and absorb their powers, managing to take down One with help from Accord. After absorbing all their powers, she and Mikhail are transported to another world and Mikhail destroys the monster Zero transforms into. With this, the flower's magic is sealed away, although Accord speculates that Zero might have survived and would reappear in some form. (Note: Accord: The Intoners have been sealed off in another world. The threat of the flower has been extinguished from this branch. However, the possibility exists that this seal could unravel itself at some time or location in the future. Until then, our recording efforts will continue. Oh. And a personal addendum regarding my observational target, Zero. Perhaps this is beyond my functional requirements as a recorder, but I cannot shake the feeling that somehow, somewhere, Zero is still alive. And that, someday... Someday, she and I will see each other again. Crazy, I know. Call it a hunch. (Branch D, The Final Song)) In the novel Drag-On Dragoon 3 Story Side, a novel detailing the events leading directly into Drakengard, a combination of events from other branches occurs. During the final confrontation with One, Mikhail is poisoned and Zero forms a pact with Mikhail to save him. After killing One, One's clone kills Zero.

== Critical reception ==
Zero has received a mixed reaction from western video game critics. GamesRadar's Becky Cunningham praised Tara Platt's performance in the role, and that her relationship with Mikhail helped humanize her. GameSpot's Heidi Kemps found Zero entertaining despite her negative portrayal, enjoying the points where she breaks the fourth wall to critique the game's puzzles and finding that she "related to [Zero] as the game progressed, which is not something I typically feel for antihero characters." Eurogamer's Chris Schilling found that Zero's presence turned the game into "a jet-black comedy", comparing her favorably to Jordan Belfort: while both unlikable characters, there was "something magnetic about their horribleness". Destructoid's Chris Carter commended Drakengard 3 and Zero, saying "[he] was drawn into [Drakengard 3's] world and its cast of characters, and I wanted to see Zero's journey through from start to finish." This view was shared by Will Borger of Gaming Bolt, who called story, characters, world, and in particular Zero, the reasons for playing the game. In addition, he felt that players would find themselves relating to her more as the story progressed. Kat Bailey of VG247.com compared her to Caim from Drakengard who is portrayed as a serial killer as well as the unnamed protagonist from Nier as they commit genocide across the playthrough, concluding that both are "little more than two-dimensional cutouts in an ocean of blood".

James Stephanie Sterling of The Escapist wrote that Zero's portrayal, especially her sexual empowerment and the fact that she had dominance over the male characters, was "refreshing". Capsule Computers' Travis Bruno commented that Zero is "largely the villain of the series", but that he felt the need to see her journey through to its end. Ron Duwell of Techno Buffalo, while commenting on the quality of the design of the characters, claimed that Zero was "the best looking of the bunch with her acrobatic kicks and sword slashes being pulled off without a hitch." Geoff Thew of Hardcore Gamer complimented the character, calling her actions, attitudes and language "a nicely self-contained example of how [Drakengard 3] plays with juxtaposition." Mike Splechta of GameZone agreed, stating "the character designs were fantastic. I loved Zero's look in particular; her white flowy dress only serves as a contrast to her violent behavior since it gets drenched in blood the more you tear enemies apart with her weapons." RPGFan's Derek Heemsbergen referred to Zero as "foul-mouthed butcher", although he was generally positive about her story and her interactions with Mikhail and the disciples, calling the latter "strange and often hilarious". Andrew Barker, in an analysis of the game for RPGFan, referred to her as "violence personified", noting how the game gradually justified her actions. She was also noted, alongside One, as being the only Intoner who had no real need for a disciple. In a final note, he said that he only felt comfortable with Zero during the game's fourth branch, where her motives were revealed. Anime News Network's Todd Ciolek described her as a conscious mockery of standard action-game protagonists, referring to her as "murderous, foul-mouthed, impulsive, abusive, and all but impossible to like."

In contrast, Kimberley Wallace of Game Informer was not as enthusiastic, saying that while Zero had some good one-liners, "the better efforts are buried in a lot of bad party banter." RPGamer's Michael Cunningham found Zero to be an "angry, vulgar woman [...] impatient, aggressive, and easily irritated", and that the lack of explanation behind Zero's actions negatively affected the plot. IGN's Meghan Sullivan was also fairly negative, saying that Zero's character, interactions and motivation were badly let down by poor writing. USGamer's Kat Bailey was generally unenthusiastic about Zero's general attitude and portrayal, saying that she was "characterized in large part by her apparent love of killing and her aggressive bitchiness toward her companion dragon". Roger Hargreaves for Metro agreed, finding Zero to be a "thoroughly unpleasant and unlikeable main character." Crunchyroll's Nate Ming was highly critical of Zero, calling her "a ruthless, backstabbing, front-stabbing, cold-hearted bitch", and said that she would be the villain in any other game.

The character has been positively received by series fans in Japan. In a popularity contest for the characters of Drakengard 3, Zero came in as the fourth most popular character of the game, with her dragon Mikhail taking first place. In the 2014 Dengeki PlayStation Awards, Zero was placed as the fourth best character of 2013. Beyond the Drakengard universe, both Zero had her dragon Mikhail appeared in the second sequel to the arcade game Lord of Vermilion.
