= Ray Chase (voice actor) =

American voice actor (born 1987)

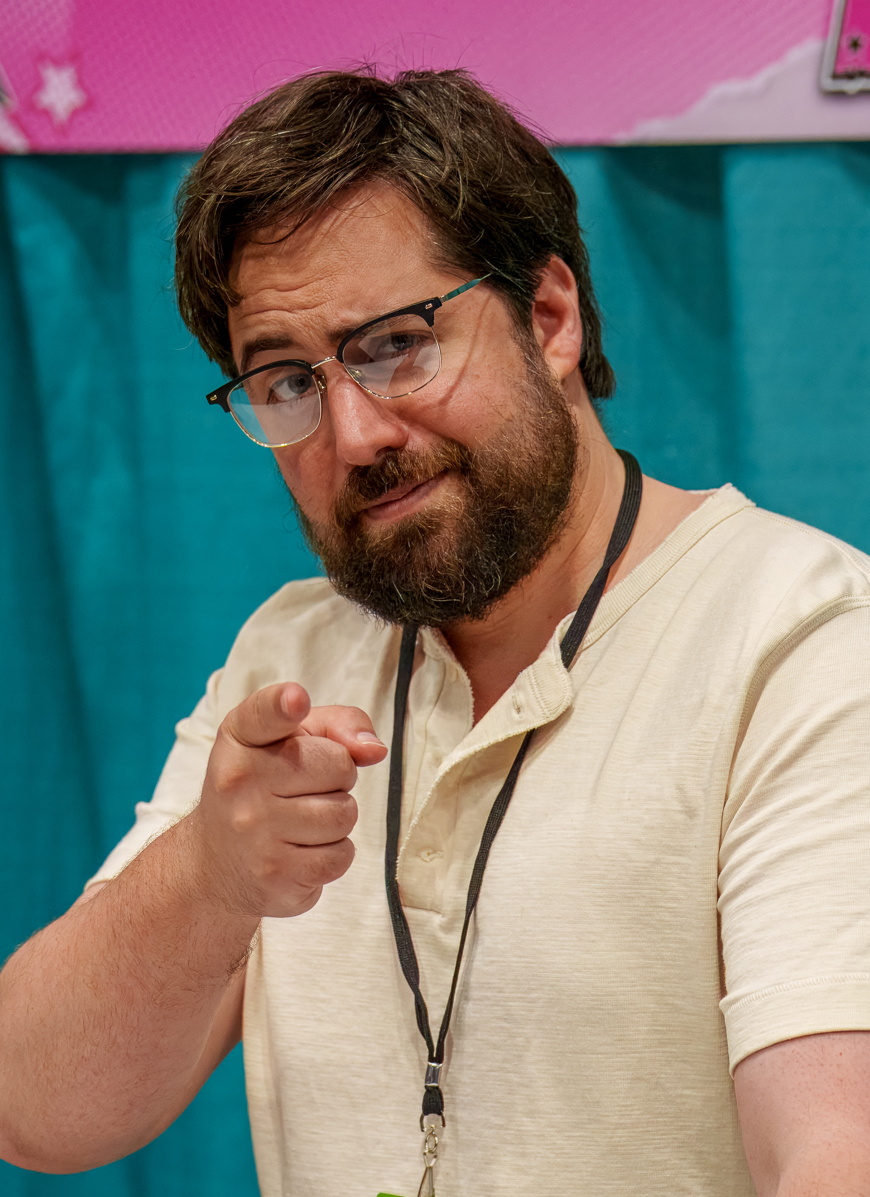
- Chase in 2025
- Born: Ray Chaifetz; May 20, 1987 (age 39); Freehold Borough, New Jersey, U.S.
- Education: University of Southern California (BA)
- Occupations: Voice actor, Game developer
- Years active: 2005–present
- Notable credits: Final Fantasy XV as Noctis Lucis Caelum; Jujutsu Kaisen as Ryomen Sukuna and Choso; X-Men '97 as Cyclops; Demon Slayer: Kimetsu no Yaiba as Tengen Uzui; Genshin Impact as Neuvillette; JoJo's Bizarre Adventure: Golden Wind as Bruno Bucciarati; Kingdom Hearts as the Master of Masters; Nier Replicant as The Protagonist; Fire Emblem as Roy; Street Fighter 6 as Guile; Bungo Stray Dogs as Fyodor Dostoevsky; Osomatsu-san as Karamatsu Matsuno; Destiny 2 as Mithrax; Cookie Run: Kingdom as Silent Salt Cookie and Almond Cookie
- Spouse: Julia McIlvaine (m. 2020)
- Website: www.raychase.com

Ray Chaifetz (born May 20, 1987), known professionally as Ray Chase, is an American voice actor who has voiced anime, animations, video games and audiobooks. He voiced Noctis Lucis Caelum in Final Fantasy XV, Ryomen Sukuna and Choso in Jujutsu Kaisen, Tengen Uzui in Demon Slayer, Neuvillette in Genshin Impact, Alphen in Tales of Arise, Silent Salt Cookie in Cookie Run: Kingdom, and Cyclops in X-Men '97 and Marvel Rivals. He is also the co-founder of Sassy Chap Games, and served as the lead designer behind the dating sim Date Everything!.

== Early life and education ==
Ray Chase was born May 20, 1987 and grew up in the area of Las Vegas, Nevada. He was in symphonic band in school but transitioned to theater which he states he fell in love with. He has stated that as a kid he wanted to be a video game actor. He graduated from USC with a Bachelor of Arts in 2009 where he was a member of the Commedus Interruptus comedy troupe. Chase stated that he also used to play ragtime piano at the USC bookstore while at the university.

== Career ==
=== Voice actor ===
Chase began his career in voice acting, auditioning for roles on Voice123. He made reels and recorded 200 audio books prior to moving into video games and anime. One of his first lead roles was that of Noctis Lucis Caelum in Final Fantasy XV which was released in 2016. He also appeared in the shows One Punch Man and Charlotte around the same time.

In 2021, he voiced the Protagonist in the 2021 remaster of Nier. Chase stated the role took more than a year to voice. In 2021, he worked with director James Wan to voice the villain role in the film Malignant. Chase was nominated for a Critics' Choice Super Award for Best Villain in a Movie for his role in the film. Chase joined the cast of Disney's X-Men '97 in 2024. He took over the role of Cyclops which was originally played by Norm Spencer.

=== Game developer ===
In 2018, Chase formed the video game company Sassy Chap Games along with voice actor Robbie Daymond. In 2025, they released Date Everything!, a dating sim where Chase served as the lead designer and voiced several of the characters. The game had over 100 voice actors on the project.

== Filmography ==
In addition to Final Fantasy XV and Nier, his other voice work has included X-Men '97 as Cyclops, Fire Emblem franchise as Roy, Gaius, Fernand, and Alfonse, the Kingdom Hearts series as the Master of Masters, Bungo Stray Dogs as Fyodor Dostoevsky, Persona 5 as the Subway Announcer, Genshin Impact as Neuvillette, Tales of Arise as Alphen, JoJo's Bizarre Adventure: Golden Wind as Bruno Bucciarati, Jujutsu Kaisen as Ryomen Sukuna and Choso, Street Fighter 6 as Guile, and Demon Slayer: Kimetsu no Yaiba as Tengen Uzui. As of 2025, Chase has voiced 274 roles from 209 titles.

=== Anime ===
List of dubbing performances in anime
Year	Title	Role	Notes	Source
2015–17, 2019–2020	JoJo's Bizarre Adventure	Donovan, Loggins, Rubber Soul, Bruno Bucciarati	Battle Tendency, Stardust Crusaders, Golden Wind	
2015–21	The Seven Deadly Sins	Howzer		
2016	Charlotte	Yu Otosaka		
2016	March Comes In like a Lion	Masamune Goto		
2016–17	Hunter × Hunter	Hanzo, Squala, Geretta	2011 series	
2016–17	Mobile Suit Gundam: Iron-Blooded Orphans	Rustal Elion		
2016–present	One-Punch Man	Puri-Puri Prisoner, Doctor Genus		
2016–22	Mob Psycho 100	Tenga Onigawara		
2017	Dragon Ball Super	Tien Shinhan, Oolong, Snackian Ambassador	Bang Zoom! dub for Toonami Asia	
2017	Cyborg 009: Call of Justice	Cyborg 004, Albert Heinrich		
2017	Berserk	Mozgus	2016 series	
2017	Glitter Force Doki Doki	Bel, Proto Mercenare		
2017	Anohana: The Flower We Saw That Day	Atsumu "Yukiatsu" Matsuyuki	2011 series	
2017	Fate/Apocrypha	Vlad the Impaler, Lancer of Black		
2018	Sword Art Online Alternative Gun Gale Online	M		
2018	Saint Seiya: The Lost Canvas	Libra Dohko		
2018	Granblue Fantasy: The Animation	Drang		
2018	FLCL Alternative	Kanda		
2018	Sirius the Jaeger	Willard		
2018–21	B: the Beginning	Dr. Keith Kazama Flick		
2018–present	Re:Zero − Starting Life in Another World	Roswaal L. Mathers, Shopkeeper		
2018–present	Boruto: Naruto Next Generations	Iwabe Yuino		
2018–20	Baki	Katsumi Orochi		
2018–23	Bungo Stray Dogs	Fyodor Dostoevsky		
2019	Neon Genesis Evangelion	Gendo Ikari	Netflix re-dub	
2019	Attack on Titan	Eren Kruger		
2019	Cells at Work!	Helper T Cell		
2019	To the Abandoned Sacred Beasts	Hank Henriette		
2019–2020	Radiant	Torque		
2020	Ghost in the Shell: SAC 2045	Quarterback		
2020	Noblesse	Cadis Etrama Di Raizel		
2020–23	Pokémon	Professor Cerise		
2020–present	Demon Slayer: Kimetsu no Yaiba	Tengen Uzui, Rokuro		
2020–present	Jujutsu Kaisen	Ryomen Sukuna, Chōsō		
2021	Mr. Osomatsu	Karamatsu Matsuno		
2021	One Piece	Donquixote Rosinante	Funimation dub	
2021	Resident Evil: Infinite Darkness	Jason		
2021	Life Lessons with Uramichi Oniisan	Tobikichi Usahara		
2021	Edens Zero	Weisz Steiner		
2021	Kuroko's Basketball	Shogo Haizaki		
2021	Vinland Saga	Bjorn	Netflix dub	
2021–23	Baki Hanma	Katsumi Orochi, Lip, Tongue, Tooth, Doctor		
2022–23	Bastard!! Heavy Metal, Dark Fantasy	Abigail, Kevidubu		
2023	Nier: Automata Ver1.1a	Eve		
2023-24	Mashle: Magic and Muscles	Rayne Ames		
2024	Monsters: 103 Mercies Dragon Damnation	Cyrano	ONA	
2024	The Seven Deadly Sins: Four Knights of the Apocalypse	Howzer		
2024	The Grimm Variations	Grey	ONA; Episode 2: Little Red Riding Hood	
2024	Kimi ni Todoke	Ryu Sanada	Season 3	
2025	Solo Leveling	Rakan		
2026–present	Baki-Dou: The Invincible Samurai	Katsumi Orochi		
2026–present	Kill Blue	Juzo Ogami (adult)		
2026–present	Needy Girl Overdose	Kache's boyfriend		

=== Animation ===
List of voice performances in animation
Year	Title	Role	Notes	Source
2018	Voltron: Legendary Defender	Lieutenant Lahn		
2022	The Boss Baby: Christmas Bonus	Dongle		
2024–26	Rock Paper Scissors	The Rat Bros		
2024–present	X-Men '97	Scott Summers / Cyclops, additional voices	15 episodes; Replacing original voice actor Norm Spencer	
2025	Big City Greens	Sir Velociraptor	Episode: "Saxon Saxability"	
2025	The Mighty Nein	Executioner, Priest		
2025–present	Devil May Cry	John Arkham/Jester, Agni & Rudra, Mundus		

=== Films ===
List of voice performances in films
Year	Title	Role	Notes	Source
2016	Kingsglaive: Final Fantasy XV	Noctis Lucis Caelum		
2016	Mobile Suit Gundam Thunderbolt: December Sky	Graham	English dub	
2017	Justice League Dark	Jason Blood, Etrigan the Demon	Direct-to-video	
2017	Your Name	Shinta Takagi	English dub	
2017	Fairy Tail: Dragon Cry	Zash Caine	English dub	
2018	Godzilla: Planet of the Monsters	Eliott Leland		
2018	My Hero Academia: Two Heroes	David Shield	English dub	
2019	Evangelion Death (True)^{2}	Gendo Ikari	Netflix dub	
2019	The End of Evangelion	Gendo Ikari	Netflix dub	
2019	Wonder Woman: Bloodlines	Head Bandit		
2020	NiNoKuni	Bauer Linden	English dub	
2020	Altered Carbon: Resleeved	Takeshi Kovacs		
2020	Justice League Dark: Apokolips War	Etrigan the Demon	Direct-to-video	
2021	Malignant	Gabriel May		
2021	Demon Slayer: Kimetsu no Yaiba – The Movie: Mugen Train	Tengen Uzui	English dub	
2021	Poupelle of Chimney Town	Toshiaki	English dub	
2022	The Deer King	Van	English dub	
2022	Constantine: The House of Mystery	Etrigan the Demon, Ritchie Simpson	Short film; direct-to-video	
2023	Black Clover: Sword of the Wizard King	Gimodelo		
2025	The Witcher: Sirens of the Deep	Zelest		
2025	Detective Conan: The Black Iron Submarine	Yuya Kazami, Hans		
2025	Demon Slayer: Kimetsu no Yaiba – The Movie: Infinity Castle	Tengen Uzui	English dub	

=== Video games ===
List of voice performances in video games
Year	Title	Role	Notes	Source
2013	Killer Instinct	Cinder, Arbiter		
2014	D4: Dark Dreams Don't Die	Duncan		
2015	Fallout 4		Deleted role	
2015	Xenoblade Chronicles X	L		
2016	Star Ocean: Integrity and Faithlessness	Daks		
2016	Deus Ex: Mankind Divided	Louis Gallois		
2016	The Legend of Heroes: Trails of Cold Steel II	Duke Cayenne		
2016	World of Final Fantasy	Edgar Roni Figaro, Noctis Lucis Caelum	Archived audio for Noctis	
2016	Final Fantasy XV	Noctis Lucis Caelum		
2017	Tales of Berseria	Artorius Collbrande		
2017	Kingdom Hearts HD 2.8 Final Chapter Prologue	Master of Masters	Kingdom Hearts χ Back Cover movie	
2017	Fire Emblem Heroes	Alfonse, Roy, Gaius		
2017	Fire Emblem Echoes: Shadows of Valentia	Fernand		
2017	Nier: Automata	Eve		
2017	Mass Effect: Andromeda	Evfra De Tershaav		
2017	Persona 5	Shibuya Subway Announcer, Shadow Asakura/Mara		
2017	Akiba's Beat	Mizuki Aihara		
2018	Dissidia Final Fantasy NT	Noctis Lucis Caelum		
2018	Octopath Traveler	Additional voices		
2018	The Walking Dead: The Final Season	Marlon		
2018	Valkyria Chronicles 4	Klaus Walz		
2018	Pathfinder: Kingmaker	The Lantern King		
2018	Dragalia Lost	Alfonse		
2018	Soulcalibur VI	Heishiro Mitsurugi		
2018	Super Smash Bros. Ultimate	Roy		
2018	BlazBlue: Cross Tag Battle	Yūki Terumi (Susanoo)		
2018	Epic Seven	Sez, Taranor Royal Guard, Purrgis, Tywin, Ambitious Tywin		
2018	Fallout 76	Grahm, Jacob Lerner, Simon Gladwell, Super Mutants, Additional Voices		
2018	Food Fantasy	Beer, Boston Lobster, Steak	English voices	
2019	Bloodstained: Ritual of the Night	Gebel		
2019	Anthem	Freelancer (Male)		
2019	Left Alive	Ruslan Arsenyevich Izmailov		
2019	Sekiro: Shadows Die Twice	Genichiro Ashina		
2019	Judgment	Keigo Izumida		
2019	Marvel Ultimate Alliance 3: The Black Order	Winter Soldier		
2019	Pokémon Masters	Marlon		
2019	Daemon X Machina	Klondike, Red Dog		
2019	Borderlands 3	Rhys Strongfork		
2019	Indivisible	Latigo, Paidal		
2019	Call of Duty: Modern Warfare	Additional voices		
2019	Death Stranding	The Craftsman, Rescueworker, The Doctor		
2020	Kingdom Hearts III Re Mind	Master of Masters		
2020	One-Punch Man: A Hero Nobody Knows	Puri-Puri Prisoner		
2020	Half-Life: Alyx			
2020	Persona 5 Royal	Subway Announcer, Shadow Asakura/Mara, additional voices		
2020	Fallout 76: Wastelanders	Ward, Fritz		
2020	The Last of Us Part II	WLF Soldier, additional voices		
2020	World of Warcraft: Shadowlands	Sire Denathrius		
2020	Yakuza: Like a Dragon	Nick Ogata/Piss Wizard		
2021	Fallout: The Frontier	Tiberius Rancor	Mod for Fallout: New Vegas	
2021	Re:Zero − Starting Life in Another World: The Prophecy of the Throne	Roswaal L. Mathers		
2021	Nier Replicant ver.1.22474487139...	Player: Second Half		
2021	Shin Megami Tensei III: Nocturne HD Remaster	Gouto-Douji		
2021	Ratchet & Clank: Rift Apart	Goons-4-Less, Nefarious Troopers, additional voices		
2021	Akiba's Trip: Hellbound & Debriefed	Shun "Chief" Anekoji		
2021	Cookie Run: Kingdom	Almond Cookie, Silent Salt Cookie		
2021	Tales of Arise	Alphen, Owl King		
2021	Lost Judgment	Matsuhisa Koga, Ghost		
2021	Demon Slayer: Kimetsu no Yaiba – The Hinokami Chronicles	Tengen Uzui		
2021	Destiny 2	Mithrax		
2021	Shin Megami Tensei V	Additional voices		
2022	New Tales from the Borderlands	Rhys Strongfork		
2022	Wylde Flowers	Westley Vuk		
2022	The Tale of Onogoro	Masatake Arakida		
2022	Call of Duty: Modern Warfare II	Additional Voice		
2022	Star Ocean: The Divine Force	Theo Kremrath		
2023	Fire Emblem Engage	Roy		
2023	Street Fighter 6	Guile		
2023	Armored Core VI: Fires of Rubicon	Narrator, additional voices		
2023	Everspace 2	Adam Roslin, Roslin		
2023	Diablo IV	Barbarian (Male)		
2023	Genshin Impact	Neuvillette		
2023	Remnant 2	The Custodian		
2024	Like a Dragon: Infinite Wealth	Additional voices		
2024	Granblue Fantasy: Relink	Rilla		
2024	Jujutsu Kaisen: Cursed Clash	Ryomen Sukuna, Choso		
2024	Unicorn Overlord	Mandrin, Great Sage of Cornia		
2024	Helldivers 2	Extraction Pilot AKA Pelican 1 (one)		
2024	Call of Duty: Black Ops 6	Additional voices		
2025	Rune Factory: Guardians of Azuma	Veyron		
2025	Dune: Awakening	Ghavouri, Cpt. Lupino Ord, Chayson Vernius, Landsraad Vehicle Vendor		
2025	Date Everything!	Scandalabra, Wallace, Lyric, Ballcock	Also wrote, directed, and executive produced	
2025	Raidou Remastered: The Mystery of the Soulless Army	Gouto-Douji		
2025	Death Stranding 2: On the Beach	Ridge Frost		
2025	Demon Slayer: Kimetsu no Yaiba – The Hinokami Chronicles 2	Tengen Uzui		
2025	Borderlands 4	Amon The Forgeknight		
2026	The Legend of Heroes: Trails Beyond the Horizon	Kevin Graham		
2026	Monster Hunter Stories 3: Twisted Reflection	Fiero		
2026	Marvel Rivals	Scott Summers / Cyclops		
2026	Marvel Cosmic Invasion	Scott Summers / Cyclops	DLC character	
2026	Marvel Tokon: Fighting Souls	Scott Summers / Phoenix Cyclops	DLC character	
2026	Ace Combat 8: Wings of Theve	William Coster		
2026	Castlevania: Belmont's Curse	Leon Belmont		
2026	Order of the Sinking Star	The Director-on-Sabbatical		
2027	Persona 4 Revival	Ryotaro Dojima		

=== Live-action roles ===
List of live-action performances in films
Year	Title	Role	Notes	Source
2021	Licorice Pizza	B. Mitchel Reed		

=== Audiobooks ===
List of voice performances in Audiobooks
Year	Title	Role	Notes	Source
2013–18	Yesterday's Gone (seasons 1–6)	Boricio Wolfe		
2014–15	The Beam	Doc	Seasons 1–2	
2015	Crash	Thomas Witt		
2017	Blood, Sweat, and Pixels: The Triumphant Stories Behind How Video Games Are Made	Narrator		
2021	Press Reset: Ruin and Recovery in the Video Game Industry	Narrator		
2022	Epithet Erased – Prison of Plastic	Rick Shades		
2024	Play Nice: The Rise, Fall, And Future Of Blizzard Entertainment	Narrator		
