= Kainé =

Video game character from the Drakengard series

- Drakengard character
- Artwork by Akihiko Yoshida
- First game: Nier (2010)
- Created by: Yoko Taro
- Designed by: D.K; Akihiko Yoshida (2021)
- Voiced by: EN: Laura Bailey; JA: Atsuko Tanaka

Kainé (Note: Japanese: カイネ, Hepburn: Kaine) is a character from the 2010 video game Nier, a spin-off of the Drakengard series developed by Cavia and published by Square Enix. She is a lead character and player companion in Nier, and prominent in related media and merchandise. During Nier she accompanies the player-named protagonist in his quest to help a young girl called Yonah, first to cure her disease and then to rescue her from a being called the Shadowlord in a post-apocalyptic world beset by creatures called Shades. Kainé's storyline focuses around her quest for revenge against a monstrous Shade called Hook, and her history of discrimination due to being possessed by a Shade and being born intersex.

Kainé was created by Yoko Taro, director and story writer of Nier, as an unconventional female-identifying lead. Korean illustrator D.K created her design, and writers Sawako Natori and Jun Eishima contributed to her backstory. Her design was updated by Akihiko Yoshida for the 2021 remaster of Nier. Across all spoken appearances, she is voiced by Laura Bailey in English and Atsuko Tanaka in Japanese. The character was noted and generally praised by critics for her portrayal, though her outfit and swearing drew some mixed reactions. She is also a popular character with fans of the Nier series.

== Appearances ==
=== Nier ===
Kainé appears prominently in Nier as a companion character to the unnamed protagonist. She is a Replicant, one of the soulless artificial humans that populate the Earth following an apocalyptic magical pandemic. Human souls exist as shadow-like beings called Gestalts intended to rejoin with their Replicant counterparts. After the Replicants gained sentience and see the Gestalts as monsters dubbing them "Shades", the two sides come into conflict. Kainé was intended to be born female, but a fault in the Replicant production system causes her to be born intersex. (Note: Kainé is specifically described by Yoko and other staff as a "hermaphrodite" (futanari in Japanese interviews). Later English material describes her as intersex.) Suffering discrimination from her home village the Aerie, she is cared for by her grandmother Kali, who treats her as a woman, encourages her to use feminine clothing, and influences her tendency to swear. When the two are attacked by the monstrous Shade Hook and Kali is killed, Kainé survives by being possessed by the disembodied Shade Tyrann. This causes further discrimination, and Kainé chooses to live only for revenge against Hook.

Kainé ultimately kills Hook with help from the protagonist, who encourages her to help him search for a cure to the Black Scrawl appearing among the Replicants and infecting the young girl Yonah. (Note: Yonah is the protagonist's younger sister in the Replicant version, and daughter in the Gestalt version.) She chooses to live as a loyal ally and "sword" to the protagonist. She also interacts with his other companions, sharing a bickering relationship with the talking book Grimoire Weiss, and forming a sibling relationship with the young Emil who suffers isolation due to his petrification powers. She briefly sacrifices herself by allowing Emil to petrify her to seal away a powerful Shade when the Gestalt leader Shadowlord kidnaps Yonah. Five years later Emil releases her and she helps the group hunt down the Shadowlord. During one fight with Shades, the Aerie and its people are destroyed.

In the game's first two endings, Kainé helps the protagonist kill the Shadowlord and rescue Yonah before leaving them; the Shadowlord's death will eventually lead to the extinction of both Replicants and Gestalts in one timeline. Subsequent playthroughs, which begin following Kainé's release from the seal, show further backstory for characters including Kainé and the Gestalts. The final two endings are based around a choice after Kainé is overwhelmed by Tyrann and goes berserk following the Shadowlord's death; the protagonist can either kill her to end her suffering, or sacrifice his and Tyrann's existence to restore her normal form, leaving her and Yonah with no memories of him.

=== Related media and crossovers ===
Further details around Kainé's backstory are included in Grimoire Nier, a guidebook featuring plot and character summaries, short stories, concept art and developer commentary. She is the lead character in the Grimoire Nier short story The Lost World, and a playable character in the new ending section of the 2021 expanded remaster Nier Replicant ver.1.22474487139... based on this story. As the world grows worse following the Shadowlord's death, Kainé has recurring dreams of the protagonist. She restores the protagonist's human form after a confrontation with the plant-like Sleeping Beauty computer system. Kainé is featured in the 2011 CD Drama NieR Replicant Drama CD The Lost Words and the Red Sky, which included both the in-game version and a non-canon version in a high school setting. She is also featured as a character in a special event in the mobile game Nier Reincarnation (2021).

Kainé was featured as a downloadable content costume for Drakengard 3 (2013) and Nier: Automata (2017), and featured in a crossover with PUBG: Battlegrounds (2017). Kainé was planned to feature in a collaboration with the mobile game SINoALICE alongside the Nier protagonist and Emil, but she was not included due to budgetary limits relating to her voice actress. Promotional merchandise themed after Kainé has been produced, including a plushy toy, a Nendoroid figureine, and a Play Arts Kai figurine which includes different accessories and pieces for poses.

== Creation and design ==
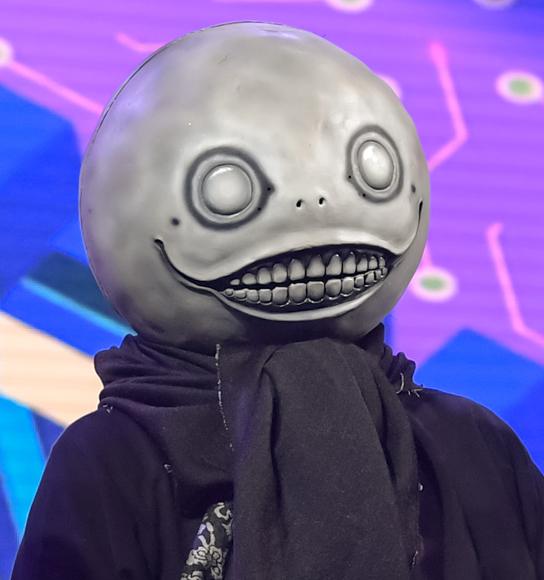
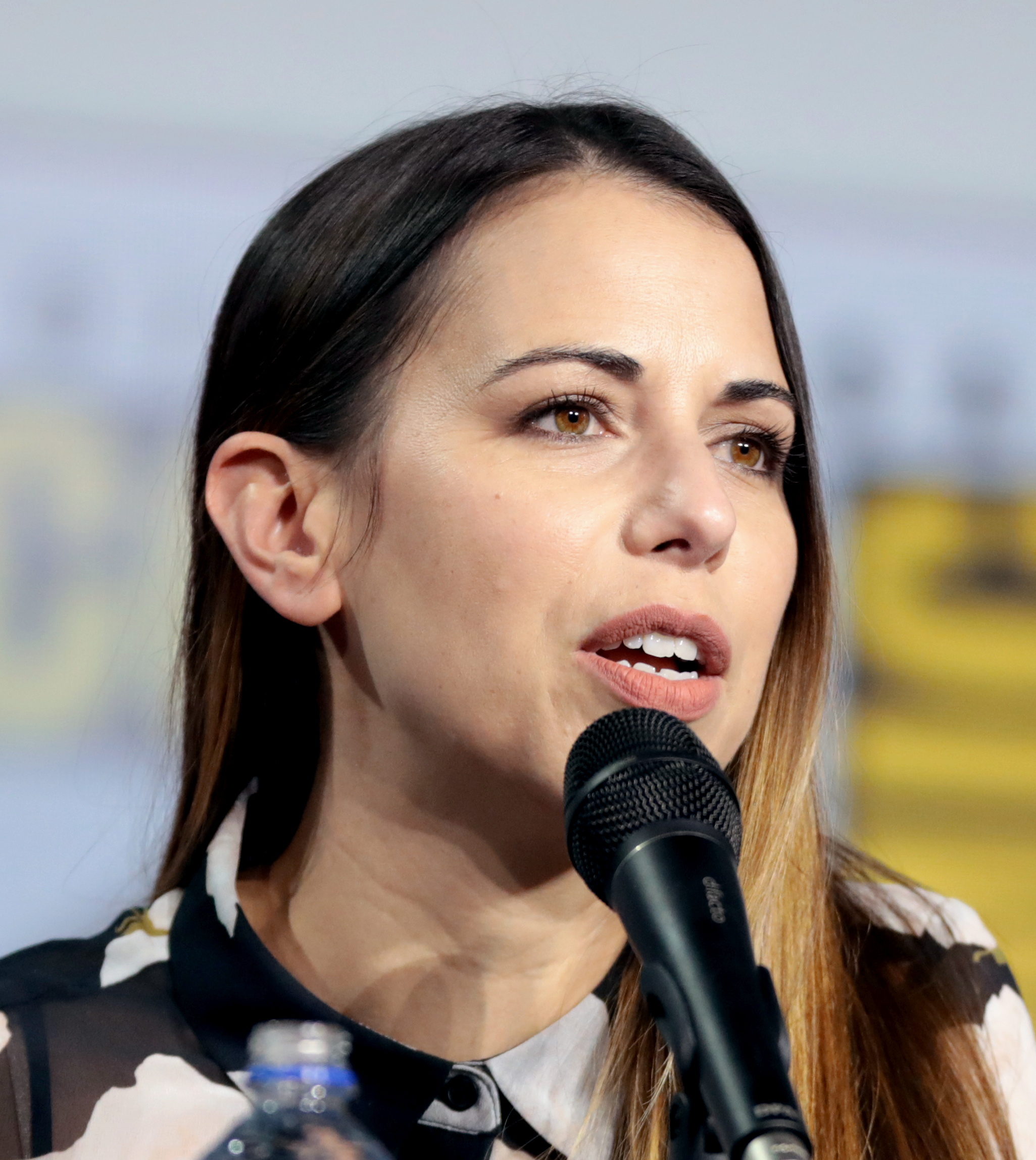
Nier director and story writer Yoko Taro created the character of Kainé. She is voiced in English by Laura Bailey, who called the role a fan favorite.

Kainé was created by Yoko Taro, director and story writer of Nier (2010), in response to a female staff member's vague wish for a "male heroine". Yoko worked on her story with co-writer Sawako Natori, with later short stories by Jun Eishima further expanding on her character. Originally assuming her intersexality would be a hidden aspect of her backstory, Yoko was surprised that it formed part of the game's marketing. Yoko did not emphasise her intersexuality or the parallel narrative of Emil being gay, stating that people like them existed in real-life and it felt natural to represent them. He also described Kainé's intersexuality as fitting with her tragic backstory. Important to her in-game portrayal was the main cast's acceptance of her presented gender, with Grimoire Weiss never using insults based on her intersexuality. Her backstory was expanded through later short stories, something Natori was keen on due to a lack of direct exploration in-game. Kainé's relationship with the protagonist was not portrayed as explicitly romantic in-game as Yoko both felt unequipped to write a romance and saw the group dynamic as familial, though in the guidebook interview Yoko confirmed Kainé developed romantic feelings for the protagonist.

The choice whether to kill or save Kainé during the game's final endings was based around how much players would have come to like her. Nier short story writer Jun Eishima felt that each ending was better suited to different versions of the protagonist; the father would choose to kill Kainé, while the brother would sacrifice himself. The ending scenario included in Grimoire Nier was initially an alternate proposal if the fourth ending, which involved players' save data being deleted, was not approved. The Grimoire Nier scenario was included in the remaster due to the game's larger budget, and a request from producer Yosuke Saito for more fan service.

Korean illustrator D.K was responsible for Kainé's character design. Her early design was less provocative, having a long dress and feminine manner which hid her violent personality. Yoko's request was for a character with one arm and one leg exposed. D.K's designs shocked Yoko and other members of staff as they mostly revolved around underwear. Yoko attempted to adjust the design himself by adding a "front flap" to hide her most exposed areas. While fearing it would be vetoed, Yoko successfully pushed through her final design. For the remaster, the staff wanted to bring D.K back for Kainé's redesign, but he had moved back to Korea and was unable to work with them, though he supported both the remaster and the new artist. Kainé was instead redesigned by Akihiko Yoshida, lead character designer on Nier: Automata. Yoshida was invited onto the project, alongside fellow artists Kimihiko Fujisaka and Toshiyuki Itahana, as an earlier collaborator with Yoko.

=== Portrayal ===
Across all her appearances, Kainé is voiced by Laura Bailey in English and Atsuko Tanaka in Japanese. The English voice recording was done first, with Yoko supervising. Yoko was not impressed by the cute-sounding voices being considered for her, pushing for Tanaka in the role due to her "sharp and bold voice". Tanaka returned for the drama CD, describing her role involving much screaming, but noting that the high school scenario allowed her to show a different side to the character.

For the 2021 remaster, Yoko wanted the English voices to sound different compared to the original, and the team were worried about whether Bailey would want to reprise the role as she had become a prominent voice actress. Bailey was happy to reprise the role, as it remained popular among her fans. Bailey described Kainé as having "so many different aspects" to her that each scene could show something new. She also enjoyed responding to the performance of Liam O'Brien, who voiced Grimoire Weiss. Due to the COVID-19 pandemic, voice recording was done remotely.

A prominent feature of the character was her swearing, which was used in early trailers. In the Japanese version, Kainé's swearing was censored out using bleeps. This was done as a joke, and a reference to both Japan's stricter rules around swearing and his trouble with censorship with the original Drakengard. In the English version, the beeping was left out due to negative feedback from Western playtesters, and localization company 8-4 "went nuts", featuring much more swearing in their first draft. Square Enix ultimately asked them to tone down the swearing in the final script. Yoko oversaw the English dubbing, with Kainé's swearing needing to be matched with where the beeps were in the Japanese version.

== Reception ==
The character of Kainé is popular among fans of Nier. In a series popularity poll run commemorating the release of Nier: Automata, Kainé earned nearly 30% of votes, ranking as the most popular Nier character. In a 2022 article on women in RPGs, RPGFan's Zach Wilkerson called her the "beating heart" of Nier and Yoko's best character. Bailey has called Kainé is one of her best-liked performances, with fans regularly asking her to autograph copies of Nier as the character.

Kainé saw positive responses from journalists in reviews of the original Nier. Dustin Quillen of 1Up.com highlighted Kainé as a unique video game character, feeling that her portrayal and nature may have contributed to the game's M rating in North America. GameSpot's Kevin VanOrd found Kainé "[not] wholly unlikable" but felt her swearing was out of place, while IGN's Ryan Clements called her a fantastic character and one of the game's redeeming features. Eurogamer writer Chris Schilling described the character as a "profanity-spitting Lady Gaga-alike".

Reviews of the remaster also mentioned her positively. Michael Higham of GameSpot said Kainé would win players' hearts with her attitude and character growth. Mitchell Saltzman, writing for IGN, described the character as "an absolute badass [and] hilarious in her vulgarity". Electronic Gaming Monthly's Mollie E. Patterson attributed both Kainé and Emil with holding the narrative together through their interactions with the protagonist. Alan Wen of Video Games Chronicle positively noted Kainé among the cast, contrasting her clothing against the revealing outfit of Metal Gear character Quiet. Pascal Tekaia of RPGamer praised both Bailey's performance as Kainé and her banter with O'Brien as Grimoire Weiss. Jose Torres, writing for RPG Site, praised Kainé's redesign while also finding it the most jarring character change in the remaster. In contrast, PCGamesN's Ian Boudreau negatively described Kainé as "a powerful but troubled swordswoman who often curses and spends the entire game in a distractingly incongruous nightgown." Malindy Hetfeld of Eurogamer noted that there was little to define Kainé beyond her outfit and swearing until the late game.

Kainé's intersexuality has seen commentary. In a 2016 article on LGBT representation in gaming for the International Journal of Communication, Adrienne Shaw and Elizaveta Friesem noted Kainé as potentially the only prominent intersex character in video games despite her female-identifying behaviour and clothing. Alana Hagues of RPGFan highlighted Kainé for her relatable representation of queerness, and her support of other marginalized characters in the narrative. However, she also felt that this was undermined by an in-game achievement in the remaster for looking up Kainé's skirt. Austin Jones of Paste, speaking of his own experience with coming out, highlighted how Kainé and Emil support each other and committed themselves to selfless actions despite being isolated from the world they defended.
