= Nier (video game) =

2010 video game

- Original cover art showing (from center to left) the player-named protagonist, Kainé, and Emil
- Developer: Cavia (Note: Remaster developed by Toylogic.)
- Publisher: Square Enix
- Director: Yoko Taro
- Producers: Takuya Iwasaki; Yosuke Saito
- Designer: Daisuke Iizuka
- Programmer: Takeshi Katayama
- Artists: D.K; Yoshio Kamikubo; Shogo Tojo
- Writers: Hana Kikuchi; Sawako Natori
- Composers: Keiichi Okabe; Kakeru Ishihama; Keigo Hoashi; Takafumi Nishimura
- Series: Drakengard
- Platforms: Nier Gestalt; PlayStation 3; Xbox 360; Nier Replicant; PlayStation 3 (Note: Japan); PlayStation 4; Xbox One; Windows
- Release: PS3, Xbox 360: AS/AU: April 22, 2010; EU: April 23, 2010; NA: April 27, 2010; PS4, Xbox One: AS: April 22, 2021; NA/EU: April 23, 2021; Windows: WW: April 23, 2021
- Genres: Action role-playing, hack and slash
- Mode: Single-player

Nier (Note: Stylized as NieR) is a 2010 action role-playing game developed by Cavia and published by Square Enix for the PlayStation 3 and Xbox 360. In Japan, the game was released as Nier Replicant (Note: Japanese: ニーア レプリカント, Hepburn: Nīa Repurikanto) for the PlayStation 3 with a younger main character, while an alternative version titled Nier Gestalt (Note: Japanese: ニーア ゲシュタルト, Hepburn: Nīa Geshutaruto) with an older main character was released for the Xbox 360; Gestalt was released outside Japan as Nier for both platforms. A remaster of the Replicant version called Nier Replicant ver.1.22474487139... (Note: Japanese: ニーア レプリカントver.1.22474487139..., Hepburn: Nīa Repurikanto ver.1.22474487139...) was released internationally for PlayStation 4, Xbox One, and Windows in 2021.

The game is a spin-off from the Drakengard series, following the fifth ending of the first game, the events of which have left Earth in ruin. Set over a thousand years later, the story follows the player-named protagonist attempting to find a cure for a terminal illness afflicting a young girl named Yonah. (Note: In Replicant and its remaster, she is the protagonist's sister. In Gestalt, she is the protagonist's daughter.) The gameplay borrows elements from various video game genres, occasionally switching between them and the main role-playing-based gameplay.

Beginning production in 2007, the game was directed by Drakengard creator Yoko Taro, who was given a lot of creative freedom with the project. Its storyline drew inspiration from the September 11 attacks and the war on terror, while its gameplay was partly inspired by the God of War series. Due to feedback outside of Japan, multiple versions of the protagonist were created. The music was composed by Monaca, a music studio founded by Keiichi Okabe, with several albums being released.

Nier was released to mixed reception; reviewers praised the story, characters, and soundtrack and were mixed in their opinions of how well the disparate gameplay elements were connected. The execution of some gameplay elements was criticized, notably the side quests, and the graphics were regarded as substandard. Despite this, the game acquired acclaim among players over time, becoming a cult classic. The 2021 remaster was released to positive reception, with praise for the graphical and gameplay improvements. The original Nier sold 500,000 copies, while the updated version sold over 2 million copies worldwide. A sequel developed by PlatinumGames, titled Nier: Automata, was released in 2017.

== Gameplay ==
The main character fighting a giant Shade. The boss's health bar is at the bottom, a minimap can be seen at lower right, and the top right contains bars representing the protagonist's health and magic.

Nier is an action role-playing game in which players take on the role of a player-named protagonist; the protagonist is a middle-aged man in Nier Gestalt and a teenage boy in Nier Replicant, named by the player. The player directly controls the main character through a third-person perspective to interact with people, objects, and enemies throughout the game. The player can turn the camera around the characters, which allows for a 360° view of the surroundings. The three-dimensional world is divided into areas separated by loading screens, and the player can move freely throughout these areas by walking, running, jumping, and climbing ladders. In some rooms and buildings, the camera swings to the side, and the main character is restricted to moving as in a two-dimensional platforming environment, while during certain battles, the camera pulls up to simulate a top-down shoot 'em up or other video game genres.

While traveling the player is frequently attacked by monsters, which include shadowy figures called Shades, large animals, and robots. Defeating these enemies gives the player experience points that can increase the main character's power and money that can be used to purchase items. The player's weapons can be customized to have greater damage and abilities using materials that can be purchased, dropped from monsters, or scavenged around the world. Multiple varieties of each weapon type can be acquired. The player can also use magic spells, which require enough energy from a constantly regenerating amount to cast. These spells include projectiles and large shadowy fists, among others; new spells are acquired in the first half of the game by completing specific battles. In addition to the main plotline, Nier includes numerous sidequests, which give the player experience points and money, as well as fishing and farming segments.

== Synopsis ==
In the mid 21st century, in the midst of a snowstorm in summer amid a ruined city, the protagonist fends off ethereal black monsters to protect a sick young girl named Yonah. The protagonist uses a magical book to fend off the creatures, but Yonah touches it and is covered in black markings, worsening her condition. The story moves to over a thousand years later, with the current feudal civilization in decline and the black creatures—dubbed Shades—becoming more hostile. The protagonist and Yonah live in a village built within post-industrial ruins, with the protagonist taking odd jobs from the village leaders, twin sisters Devola and Popola, to earn money to support the sick Yonah. While rescuing Yonah from a temple after she wanders there looking for a rare flower, the protagonist meets the talking book Grimoire Weiss, which suggests that the two team up to use Weiss's magic and to find a cure for Yonah's disease, identified as the terminal Black Scrawl. In their search, they encounter Kainé, a hot-tempered and foul-mouthed swordswoman, and Emil, a blindfolded boy whose eyes petrify anyone they see. After journeying for a time, the protagonist's village is attacked by a giant Shade. The battle ends with Emil being forced to petrify Kainé to seal the shade, and Yonah being kidnapped by a master Shade dubbed the Shadowlord.

The game jumps forward five years, with the situation worsening. The protagonist and Emil successfully find the power necessary to free Kainé and kill the giant Shade, but getting the power transforms Emil into a skeletal being the villagers fear. Under Devola's and Popola's guidance, the party seeks parts of a stone key that will unlock a pathway to the Shadowlord. After defeating five Shades and assembling the key, the team goes to defeat the Shadowlord. Devola and Popola then confront the party, revealing themselves to be allied with the Shadowlord in the name of a greater plan. 1300 years prior, humanity faced extinction due to an incurable disease. In an attempt to survive, they separated their souls from their bodies; the current humans are artificial Replicant bodies who developed their own personalities, while the Shades are human souls—dubbed Gestalts—who are slowly losing their minds through being unable to reunite with their bodies. The Black Scrawl is a side effect of the Gestalts' insanity degrading their Replicant counterparts. The Shadowlord is the prime Gestalt used to stabilize them, and Devola and Popola are androids who oversee the system. The party defeats the twins, with Emil sacrificing himself in the process. The remaining group then defeats the Shadowlord, revealed to be the Gestalt of the prologue's protagonist, with his actions driven by the wish to save his Yonah by reuniting her Gestalt and Replicant. Though successfully rejoined, the Gestalt Yonah dissipates to save her Replicant version's life, and after Grimoire Weiss sacrifices himself to weaken the Shadowlord's power, the protagonist kills him.

If the player enters further playthroughs, events start just after Kainé is freed. Kainé's past is focused on, showing the discrimination she suffered due to her parents' deaths, being born intersex, and later being partially possessed by the rogue Gestalt Tyrann. Through Tyrann, the player can understand the previously garbled speech of Gestalts. New story sequences show the Gestalt antagonists' motivations and backstory, showing them to be sentient and fighting for their own beliefs and goals. The second ending shows the spirit of the Gestalt protagonist and Yonah reuniting in the afterlife and reveals that Emil survived; further information confirms that the Shadowlord's death will lead to humanity's extinction as Replicants and Gestalts can no longer be rejoined. In a third or further playthrough, Kainé becomes overwhelmed by Tyrann, going berserk and forcing the protagonist to fight her. The protagonist can either kill her to end her suffering (the third ending) or sacrifice his life for her (the fourth ending). The latter choice erases memory of him from Kainé and Yonah and deletes all of the player's save data.

The updated version of Replicant adds a fifth ending after a new game is begun following the fourth ending, beginning after the defeat of Kainé's Shade nemesis Hook. Three years after the Shadowlord's defeat, Kainé continues having nightmares about losing something precious and fights increasingly hostile Shades. Investigating a settlement, she finds its people killed by robots emerging from its central tree, the control unit recording Replicant memories. Kainé is talked to by the control unit's AI through twin childlike avatars. She is aided in battling machine duplicates of her by Emil, eventually entering the tree's mainframe and battling enemies drawn from her memories. She ultimately battles a more powerful Hook, helped by the data remains of Grimoire Weiss. Kainé destroys Hook and the AI, restoring the protagonist in his young form; all of the player's save data prior to the fourth ending is consequently restored.

== Development ==
The concept that would become Nier was first proposed following the release of Drakengard 2 and the reveal of seventh-generation consoles. The original concept was for a third entry in the Drakengard series. As the project evolved, the original ideas were reworked, and the game eventually became a spin-off from the main series. Despite this, the game's director Yoko Taro continues to think of it as the third Drakengard game. Different reports described its planned platforms. An earlier report stated it was intended as an Xbox 360 exclusive, then expanded onto the PlayStation 3 (PS3). Yoko later stated that the PS3 version was the original one planned due to the lessening importance of the PlayStation 2, which Drakengard 2 had been made for. Including concept planning, the total development time lasted three years, with two years spent actually developing the game. It was initially a small-scale project, but during planning it grew into a full-fledged role-playing game.

Development was handled by Cavia with help from publisher Square Enix, who had previously provided development support for the Drakengard games. Square Enix had minimal input on Yoko's vision for the game's atmosphere and story, allowing him high creative control. The combat and action elements of Nier were inspired by the God of War series of games, which both Taro and Saito enjoyed. While the games had not been as popular in Japan as in North America, the two felt that the idea of having boss fights with different combat styles than the regular battles was an idea that would appeal to players in both regions. The changing styles, as well as the occasional changes in camera angle and movement, were meant to "accentuate [the] gap between real, modern scenery and the fantasy world" as a tie-in to the game's story. The game was designed to have gameplay that would appeal to non-Japanese players in mind, with producer Saito stating that they wanted to depart from menu-based combat. The game was meant to appeal to older players; it was intended as an action role-playing game (RPG) for an older market than Square Enix's action-RPG series Kingdom Hearts. This influenced the decision to have a main character in his 30s for the international version, as well as more blood and swearing than typical in a Square Enix RPG. The fusion of different gameplay styles was included as a homage to earlier gameplay styles and genres. The in-game cutscenes were created and directed by Studio Anima.

=== Narrative and cast ===
Nier is intended to be set over 1000 years after the original Drakengard's fifth ending. In this scenario, the game's protagonists Caim and Angelus travel across a dimensional boundary to fight a monstrous beast. After winning the battle and killing the monster, they are shot down by a fighter jet and killed; their introduction of magic to the world leads to magical research that results in the Black Scrawl. According to Yoko, after the dark story of Drakengard, Yoko focused on more positive themes of friendship and combined effort. Much of the game was inspired by the September 11 attacks and the war on terror. Yoko took from it the idea of a terrible event where both sides believed they were doing the right thing and wanted to show the player multiple perspectives of the same events. The term "Replicant" was borrowed by Yoko from the 1982 science fiction movie Blade Runner, although Yoko did not cite a particular source for Nier's name, passing it off as a codename that persisted through development. The main theme of the story was "family love" regardless of the protagonist's nature when interacting with Yonah. The final scene involves the protagonist enjoying his happy life with Yonah as requested by Saito, a decision Yoko accepted despite it clashing with his previous work.

Yoko did not aim to make Nier a sad story but he wanted to write a more lighthearted story than Drakengard which came across as far darker in retrospect. Yoko explored gender themes such Kaine identifying herself as a woman despite her origins while Emil is in conflict with his homosexuality. Nevertheless, the protagonist and Weiss never misjudge the supporting characters, creating sense of strong camaraderie in the main party. Although the supporting characters show interest in the protagonist, Yoko refrained from writing romance until the third and fourth endings where the player can either kill a corrupted Kaine or sacrifice himself to save her.

The characters were designed by an artist under the moniker D.K. Two character designs for the protagonist were created for Nier. The developers believed that the Japanese audience would respond more strongly to a younger protagonist, while non-Japanese audiences would prefer an adult protagonist character. Other than changing the protagonists appearance and modifying a few lines of dialogue to fit with him being a father rather than a brother to Yonah, the developers made no changes between the two versions; it was initially believed that the older protagonist was the character's original design. Many characters underwent changes during development, and some needed to be cut. There were originally thirteen Grimoires, with all but three—Weiss, Noir, and Rubrum—being cut. Emil's character was derived from a female character named Halua, while Kainé was originally a far more feminine type who hid her violent nature. Yonah's original Japanese name was derived from the Biblical name Jonah; this could not be taken verbatim into its localized form due to the name being associated with a man, so the name was changed to "Yonah". Yoko was initially shocked at Kainé's design but warmed to it and had it kept. Kainé's character was made intersex, since the team felt it fit in with many other aspects of her gritty backstory. Kainé's status as intersex caused some "commotion" in some regions outside of Japan, which is something the team did not actively intend. Yoko attributed the original suggestion to female staff members working on the game.

=== Music ===
The soundtrack to Nier was composed by a collaboration of the studio MoNACA, directed by Keiichi Okabe and including Kakeru Ishihama and Keigo Hoashi, and Cavia's Takafumi Nishimura. Okabe served as the lead composer and as the director for the project as a whole. Okabe was brought onto the project when the concept for the game was first being devised and worked intermittently on the soundtrack for the next three years until its release. The music for the game was generally composed entirely separately from the game's development. The music was designed for different motifs to appear in various arrangements throughout the soundtrack and also to convey a sense of sadness even during the "thrilling" tracks. Okabe was allowed a great deal of freedom regarding what the music was to sound like; game director Yoko Taro's main request was that he use a lot of vocal works.

The soundtrack to Nier is largely composed of melancholy acoustic pieces that heavily feature vocals by vocalist Emi Evans (Emiko Rebecca Evans), a singer from England living in Tokyo. She is the singer for the band freesscape, and had previously worked on video games such as Etrian Odyssey. In addition to singing, Evans was asked to write her own lyrics in futuristic languages. The composers gave her preliminary version of songs and the style they wished the language to be in, such as Gaelic or French, and she invented the words. Evans wrote songs in versions of Gaelic, Portuguese, Spanish, Italian, French, English, and Japanese, where she tried to imagine what they would sound like after 1,000 years of drifting.

Square Enix released a soundtrack album of music from the game, titled Nier Gestalt & Replicant Original Soundtrack, on April 21, 2010. The soundtrack album reached number 24 on the Japanese Oricon music charts and remained on the charts for 11 weeks. As preorder bonuses for Nier Gestalt and Nier Replicant, two mini-albums, Nier Gestalt Mini Album and Nier Replicant Mini Album, were included. An album of arranged music, NieR Gestalt & Replicant 15 Nightmares & Arrange Tracks, was published by Square Enix on December 8, 2010. The arranged album reached number 59 on the Oricon music charts, a position it held for a week. Another album, NieR Tribute Album -echo-, was released on September 14, 2011, and an album of piano arrangements, Piano Collections Nier Gestalt & Replicant, was published on March 21, 2012.

== Release ==
Nier was officially unveiled in June 2009 at the Electronic Entertainment Expo 2009 for both the PlayStation 3 and Xbox 360, along with its developer and publisher. The localizations for the game—in English, French, and German—were produced during development so that all of the versions could be released at the same time and so that Cavia and Square Enix could solicit feedback from North America and Europe on the game so that it would appeal to players outside Japan. Due to its high violence, the game was given a CERO D rating in Japan. In Japan, two versions of the game were released: Nier Gestalt for the 360, which would use the adult lead, and Nier Replicant for the PS3, which used the young lead. Outside of Japan, the Gestalt version was released on both platforms under the title Nier. The PS3 version had a Japanese voice cast, while the 360 release used the English dub. Nier released worldwide by Square Enix in April 2010: it was released on April 22 in Japan and Australia, April 23 in Europe, and April 27 in North America.

A supplementary guidebook, Grimoire Nier: The Complete Guide + Cels, was released on May 28, 2010, by ASCII Media Works. The guidebook included documentation of in-game elements, developer interviews, and novellas detailing both additional character stories and a post-game ending scenario. On May 11, Square Enix released a piece of downloadable content for the game, titled "The World of Recycled Vessel". The small expansion features a series of fifteen battles with the incarnation of Nier other than the one in the specific version of the game. Nier enters the battles in a dream world accessed through a diary in his house. The expansion offers new costumes and weapons for the game. A CD drama, NieR Replicant Drama CD The Lost Words and the Red Sky was released on April 27, 2011. The CD covers additional stories related to the game's backstory and characters.

=== Remaster ===
The remaster of Nier (right) updated the character art and used the younger version of the protagonist.

An updated version of Nier titled Nier Replicant ver.1.22474487139... was announced in March 2020 as part of the 10th anniversary celebrations for the series and was slated for a worldwide release for PlayStation 4, Xbox One, and Windows. It was released on console in Asia on April 22, 2021, and worldwide the following day. The Windows version was released worldwide on April 23. The game came in both standard and a limited "White Snow" edition exclusive to the Square Enix online store. Pre-orders came with a digital soundtrack and platform-specific art-based bonuses. An updated version of Grimoire Nier was released in Japan in 2021 and, for the first time, in English in 2023.

Yosuke Saito returned as the producer, Yoko Taro remained as creative director, and the role of game director went to Saki Ito. Development was handled by Toylogic. The combat redesign was supervised by Takahisa Taura of PlatinumGames, who had worked on the game's sequel Nier: Automata. Toylogic was brought on board due to Yoko knowing its founder, Yoichi Take, from their time working together at Cavia. Kazuma Koda, who worked on later Nier projects, contributed promotional artwork. Ito described his work reworking the combat and graphical design as preserving as much as possible while matching his own idealised memories of the game and creating something to please fans of Nier: Automata. The characters were redrawn by Akihiko Yoshida, Toshiyuki Itahana, and Kimihiko Fujisaka; all three had contributed to the Drakengard and Nier series and were brought in at Yoko's request. Yoshida worked on the redesigns of the young protagonist, Kainé, Yonah, and Emil; Itahana redesigned Devola and Popola; and Fujisaka reworked the designs for the king of Facade, his queen Fyra, and the father protagonist and designed new character Louise.

The game included new story content, content creating a narrative link to its sequel, and story content originally cut from the game. For the remaster, Yoko chose to exclusively use the brother version of the protagonist, as he had initially wanted. As the father character had apparently seen mixed responses outside of Japan, Yoko decided to feature the brother in the remaster. The father protagonist was featured as the player character in the "15 Nightmares" content, originally released as DLC dubbed "World of Recycled Vessel". The Mermaid story, featuring new character Louise, was planned for the original game but cut due to budget and reworked into a later novella. Yoko decided to include it given the opportunity but did not incorporate other novella material, as those were original stories rather than cut content. Weapon Stories, a feature from the Drakengard series and Nier: Automata, was also incorporated. The fifth ending, originally a backup plan in case the original save data deletion was dropped and later written into a novella, was included both due to Saito's request for fan service and having the budget to incorporate it. Tying into later developments in the series, elements of the fifth ending featured advanced technology.

ver.1.22474487139... features new Japanese voice work to make the game fully voiced and both new and rearranged music. The score was arranged by Okabe, Hoashi, Ryuichi Takada, Kuniyuki Takahashi, Shotaro Seo, and Oliver Good. Okabe and Hoashi composed the new tracks. Evans returned to perform vocals with Saki Nakae. The chorus work was done by Evans, Nakae, Okabe, Shotaro Seo, Yukino Orita, and KOCHO. Most of the English original cast returned, including Laura Bailey (Kaine), Liam O'Brien (Grimoire Weiss), Julie Ann Taylor (Emil), and Eden Riegel (Devola and Popola). The protagonist had two voice actors; Zach Aguilar voiced the younger version, while Ray Chase voiced the older version after the time skip.

== Reception ==
=== Initial release ===
Reception

Aggregate score
Aggregator	Score
Metacritic	PS3: 68/100; X360: 67/100

Review scores
Publication	Score
1Up.com	C−
Eurogamer	6/10
Famitsu	34/40
GameSpot	5/10
IGN	7/10
RPGamer	4.5/5
IGN Australia	7.3/10

Nier Gestalt sold over 12,500 copies in Japan the week of its release, while Replicant sold over 60,000 and was the top-selling video game in Japan that week. Replicant sold over 121,000 copies in Japan by the end of May 2010 and ended the year with over 134,000 copies sold. In 2019, Yoko estimated that Nier had sold around 500,000 copies worldwide. According to Yoko, "we weren't really in the red, but it wasn't exactly a success either".

Nier received mixed reviews. Reviewers criticized the graphics, with Ryan Clements of IGN saying that "one of Nier's greatest flaws is its visuals," while GameSpot's Kevin VanOrd bemoaned the "flavorless visuals" and "lifeless environments". Dustin Quillen of 1UP.com said that the game "looks downright primitive", while Adriaan den Ouden of RPGamer, who awarded the game a higher score than most, said that "the environments are bland and poorly rendered". The music and voice acting, however, were praised; Clements said that "both are quite excellent", den Ouden called the soundtrack "absolutely fantastic", Chris Schilling of Eurogamer said that the music was full of "memorable themes", and one of the four reviewers for the Japanese Weekly Famitsu termed it "a cut above".

Reviewers were divided in their opinion on the effectiveness of the multiple styles of gameplay presented. Seth Schiesel of The New York Times said that while "there are plenty of games that surpass it in each area," that Nier pulled all of the styles together into a "coherent, compelling whole" instead of feeling "disjointed"; he especially praised a section of the game that is presented entirely through text. Patrick Kolan of IGN Australia, however, said that while the different styles were "interesting" and one of the game's biggest strengths, they suffered from poor execution and cohesion and left the game "with split-personality disorder". Clements said that "the developers' ideas sometimes outshine the actual implementation", while highlighting the gameplay elements as part of what made the game fun. Adriaan den Ouden called out the variety as the best part of the game, likening it to a buffet table, while also acknowledging that none of the sections were "amazing" on their own and could easily be looked upon poorly.

The regular combat was reviewed as solid, if not exceptional, and the sidequests were seen as repetitive, with Quillen saying that "the side quests in Nier are about as numerous as they are totally mindless," VanOrd calling them "a series of monotonous events, often connected only by long stretches of nothing," and a Famitsu reviewer saying that they "didn't see much purpose" to them. Clements said that the combat had "a fair amount of satisfaction", though players should "not expect anything too extraordinary", and Kolan termed the combat as "moderately deep". Critics gave a generally positive review to the plot and characters; VanOrd liked most of the characters but thought Nier was bland and the story "soggy", while Schiesel called the story "provocative" and "profound", saying that it "succeeds at fostering an emotional investment in its characters and in its world". Quillen said that the plot "takes some fascinating and truly original turns" and that Nier has "a supporting cast of genuinely interesting folks," and Schilling said that the story made the game "difficult to dislike". The Famitsu reviewer that viewed the game the most favorably said that he was "blown away" by the multiple endings and that "nothing like it's been done in gaming".

In 2015, Jeffrey Matulef of Eurogamer characterized Nier as "the rare game that gets better with age". Despite "poor sales and tepid reviews", he wrote, the game had acquired a cult following, which he attributed to its "sense of wonder" due to its cryptic storytelling, mashup assortment of game mechanics, and melancholy mood.

=== Replicant ver.1.22474487139... ===
Nier Replicant ver.1.22474487139... reception

Aggregate score
Aggregator	Score
Metacritic	PC: 80/100; PS4: 83/100; XONE: 83/100

Review scores
Publication	Score
Electronic Gaming Monthly	8/10
Famitsu	34/40
Game Informer	8.25/10
GameSpot	8/10
IGN	8/10
PC Gamer (US)	90/100

By June 2021, Replicant ver 1.22474487139... had shipped over one million copies worldwide in both physical and digital sales, noted as being double the estimates for the original version. By November 2022, Replicant ver 1.22474487139... had shipped 1.5 million copies worldwide. As of February 2026, it has sold over 2 million units.

Famitsu lauded the gameplay improvements and visual upgrade, though one reviewer noted the lack of fast travel and another said some players might be thrown off by "quirks" in the design. Electronic Gaming Monthly's Mollie L. Patterson enjoyed the remaster, liking the young version of the protagonist better than the earlier adult version and praising its reworked gameplay and additions. Jason Guisao of Game Informer felt the visual upgrade was inconsistent and disliked the side quest structure but lauded the overall narrative and improvements to the game's mechanics. GameSpot's Michael Higham was generally positive about the game, praising its narrative, new elements and music while finding its gameplay and world held back by archaic design.

Mitchell Saltzmann of IGN negatively noted the repetition in later areas and the side quest design but praised the graphical and gameplay updates along with the new story content. Julie Muncy of PC Gamer positively noted the improvements to combat and general movement and praised the story's tone and additions but highlighted that the original's pacing issues were also retained. Chris Plante of Polygon enjoyed the slow pace of the narrative and the combat but disliked the archaic design and was uncomfortable with some of Kainé's storyline. Malindy Hetfeld of Eurogamer did not like the game as a whole but enjoyed its later narrative and noted that the graphical and gameplay improvements had made it playable for modern audiences and series fans.

Replicant ver 1.22474487139... won the "Best Score/Music" category at The Game Awards 2021. It also saw nominations at the 2021 NAVGTR awards in "Outstanding Animation, Technical", "Outstanding Game, Franchise Role-playing", "Outstanding Original Dramatic Score, Franchise", and "Outstanding Song, Original or Adapted".

== Legacy ==
Nier was the last game that Cavia made; the company was absorbed into its parent company, AQ Interactive, in July 2010. Square Enix executive producer Yosuke Saito later commented that "a number of things" related to Nier were in progress and that an announcement could be due in 2011. The only announcement ended up not being for a new Nier video game, but instead for a live evening concert for Nier's music titled "Nier Night ~ Evening of Madness" which took place on October 28, 2011. In March 2011, there were plans made between Yoko and Takuya Iwasaki, one of the original producers for Drakengard, to develop a port of Nier for the PlayStation Vita at Iwasaki's company Orca. The port would have incorporated material from both versions of the game. When Orca was chosen to help develop Dragon Quest X, the project was shelved. A number of key staff from Nier's development, including director Yoko and Okabe, would later reunite to work on a new entry (Drakengard 3) in the Drakengard series from which Nier was spun off.

A sequel titled Nier: Automata, developed by Square Enix and PlatinumGames for the PlayStation 4, was released in Japan on February 23, in North America on March 7, and worldwide on March 10, 2017. The PC version of Nier: Automata was released on March 17, 2017. The Xbox One version was released on June 26, 2018. The Nintendo Switch version was released on October 6, 2022. Yoko, Saito, and Okabe returned to their previous roles. Other staff members include Yoshida as lead artist and producer Atsushi Inaba. A mobile game, Nier Reincarnation, produced by Applibot, with Yoshida returning to design the characters, was released on February 18, 2021. Owing to the success of Automata, Nier was reprinted for the PlayStation 3 in PAL territories in April 2017.

== See also ==
- Celestial Alphabet
