= Emil (Nier) =

Character from the Drakengard series

- Drakengard character
- Emil in his human form and his skeleton form. Artwork by Akihiko Yoshida
- First game: Nier (2010)
- Created by: Yoko Taro
- Designed by: D.K; Akihiko Yoshida (2021)
- Voiced by: EN: Julie Ann Taylor; JA: Mai Kadowaki

Emil (Japanese: エミール, Hepburn: Emīru) is a fictional character from the Drakengard games. He was first introduced in the 2010 spin-off video game Nier, developed by Cavia and published by Square Enix. Originally a human child, Emil was transformed into a weapon designed to petrify his "sister" No.6. Designated as No.7, he sealed away his sister but was left with eyes that petrified anyone he looked at. After his origins are revealed and No.6 is defeated by Nier, Emil absorbs his sister's power at the cost of losing his human form. He returns in the sequel Nier: Automata as the only survivor of humanity, often interacting with the three androids the player can control.

Game designer Yoko Taro created Emil as a potential love interest to the protagonist, while D.K. produced his design. His character has been generally well received, with praise for his dynamic with the main cast. Following the release of the 2021 Nier remaster in Western regions, Emil became popular due to the new version exploring the character's homosexuality, an element absent in the original 2010 release. Furthermore, Emil is often comforted by both the protagonist and fellow character Kainé, which has been analysed as a positive form of LGBTQ representation in gaming.

== Appearances ==
In Nier, Emil is a blindfolded boy whose eyes petrify anyone he looks at. His butler tricks the game's protagonist and his companion Kainé into visiting his manor to help find a cure. Despite the protagonist's failure, he and Kainé befriend Emil after Kainé comforts him, encouraging him to not be ashamed by his power. After journeying for a time, a giant Shade attacks the protagonist's village. The battle ends with Emil being forced to petrify Kainé to seal the shade, and Yonah, the protagonist's sister, being kidnapped by a master Shade known as the Shadowlord.

Five years later, the protagonist and Emil find the power needed to free Kainé and kill the giant Shade, but acquiring the power transforms Emil into a skeletal being the villagers fear. Nevertheless, Emil remains in touch with Kainé and the protagonist, who continue to support him while working together to find Yonah. Before reaching the Shadowlord, Emil sacrifices himself in battle to let the protagonist and Kainé proceed in find Yonah. However, the second route reveals that Emil survives the fight. In the Nier remaster, Emil reappears to Kainé in a new body and helps her revive the protagonist, who had erased his existence in the previous route to save Kainé from her own Shade.

Emil also appears as a shop owner in Nier: Automata, several years after the events from Nier, often interacting with the three playable characters, three androids. The only survivor from the original game, Emil can be fought as a boss with multiple identical copies.

== Creation ==
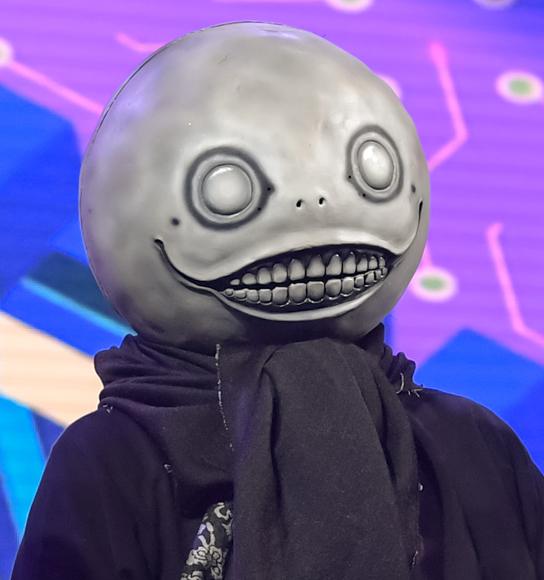
Nier director and writer Yoko Taro wearing an Emil mask

Yoko Taro, the game's writer and director, stated that while both Emil and Kainé are close to the protagonist, he refused to explore romantic relationships because he wanted to focus on the young protagonist's journey to heal his sister. Emil's character was originally derived from a female character named Halua.

Taro found Emil's character convenient due to his extended lifespan, which allows him to appear in both Nier and Nier: Automata alongside Devola and Popola and become an icon of the series. Taro aimed for players to develop a sense of familial attachment to Emil, Kainé, and Weiss as they travel around the world and fight together. In addition, during interviews, Taro often wears an Emil mask to conceal his face, preferring not to present his own image as a game creator. The mask was designed by Nier: Automata artist Yoshikaze Matsushita.

Emil was originally conceived as a giant boar, which was revised by character designer D.K., much to Taro's surprise. Taro still wanted to retain the boar design, so it was repurposed for another character, Goose. Meanwhile, the manor where Emil lives in the early segments of the story was designed to reflect the idea that time has stopped for him and that he is no longer human.

In Japanese, Emil is voiced by Mai Kadowaki, while in the English localization, the character is voiced by Julie Ann Taylor. Kadowaki was glad her character was popular with girls to the point Emil might have become her most popular work. It was also one of the few male characters she has voiced so she feels attached to him. She noted that in the CD dramas made for the spin-offs, Emil's sexual preferences are played extreme which led to fellow staff members to tell her to try a calmer pitch.

== Reception ==
Critical response to Emil's character has been generally positive. Destructoid writer James Stephanie Jeremi found the Nier cast interesting as a whole, with Emil having his own traits that make the game unique. In an article published in the Journal of Games Criticism, Emil was analyzed as one of the multiple queer archetypes the video game explores, though the author found his role to be overshadowed by Kainé's arc, especially in Route E. Kotaku journalist Ash Parrish found Emil's dynamic with Kainé likable enough to prefer playing as the two rather than the protagonist, whom they viewed as a common role-playing game archetype. Noting that the original 2010 Western Nier omitted Emil's gender themes, Jade King from TheGamer opined that the Nier remaster is more faithful to the original Emil as it explores his sexuality, particularly due to the rarity of queer characters in gaming having their feelings explored.

Aitor Fernández from Universidad de las Illes Balears argued that the lead, Kainé, and Emil represent the people rejected by society, with the first's wounds serving as a mark of what defines his exile. Additionally, Fernández wrote that Emil is the one who stands out the most. Kainé and Emil's relationship was praised by Austin Jones from The A.V. Club for how the former comforts the latter, helping him accept the supernatural powers that he is ashamed of. For example, when Emil mutates into his skeleton form, Emil is amazed by how the protagonist, Kainé, is not greatly affected by his new form; the reviewer felt that this made the relationships between the main trio touching and familial while also embracing the gender themes that Yoko Taro explores.

TheGamer writer Jake Buchalter said that Emil's homosexuality is not fully explored in the game, as the player character never responds to his confession due to it coming across as too subtle; the protagonist instead encourages Emil to look forward to his future optimistically. Alana Hagues from RPGFan agreed that both Emil and Kainé have romantic feelings for the protagonist, which are never returned despite their close relationship. Similarly, Tyler Chancey TechRaptor said that Emil's feelings were never seen nor explored in the original Nier game. The revelation of Emil's and Kainé's queer themes was argued as making them more aspirational, with the former being both an innocent and tragic character due to his young age and transformation into a skeleton-like being who feels ashamed of his new form. In particular, Chancey praised how the feelings that the two characters have for the protagonist are never treated as a joke.

In the book The Strange Works of Taro Yoko: From Drakengard to Nier: Automata, Nicolas Turcve wrote that Emil struggles to maintain his humanity in Kainé's village, with his nature as a weapon resulting in him committing genocide in the last parts of the games. Nevertheless, despite the horrors he faces while recovering his humanity, Emil is comforted by his partners again. Another part of Emil's character arc that was highlighted is a moment when the protagonist has problems dealing with Devola and Popola, and Emil takes pride in the powers and appearance he hated to take his friends to a safe place while he sacrifices himself to confront the twins. Despite such heroic sacrifice, this scene was described as sad due to the game's writing focusing on Emil's loneliness as he wants to once again meet the protagonists, Kainé and Weiss, who become devastated over the loss of their partner.

Outside Nier and its remaster, Emil was well received for his role in the sequel Nier: Automata as a shopseller and eventual optional boss character, according to Engadget journalist Jessica Conditt. In addition, when it was announced that Yoko Taro would work in a new television series based on Neon Genesis Evangelion, Stellar Blade director Hyung-Tae Kim created an illustration of recurring character Asuka Langley Soryu surrounded by Emil heads. This artwork proved to be controversial for relying on artificial intelligence, with Mosizhita claiming, "This is the first time I've seen something I created clearly incorporated into a generative AI. The peepholes and paint quirks remain exactly as they were."
